= 2022–23 Rangers F.C. season =

Rangers
2022–23 season
- Chairman: Douglas Park (until 4 April); John Bennett (from 4 April)
- Manager: Giovanni van Bronckhorst (until 21 November); Michael Beale (from 28 November)
- Stadium: Ibrox Stadium
- Scottish Premiership: 2nd
- Scottish Cup: Semi-finals
- League Cup: Runners-up
- Champions League: Group stage
- Top goalscorer: League: James Tavernier (16); All: Antonio Čolak; James Tavernier (18)
- Highest home attendance: 50,121 (v Napoli, 14 September 2022)
- Lowest home attendance: 30,569 (v Queen of the South, 30 August 2022)
- Average home league attendance: 49,116
- Biggest win: 4–0 vs St Johnstone (13 August 2022) vs Ross County (27 August 2022) vs Hearts (1 October 2022) vs St Mirren (8 October 2022)
- Biggest defeat: 1–7 vs Liverpool (12 October 2022)
Home colours	Away colours	Third colours

The 2022–23 season was the 143rd season of competitive football by Rangers.

== Players ==
=== Squad information ===
N	Pos.	Nat.	Name	Age	Since	App	Goals	Ends	Transfer fee	Notes
1	GK	(Scotland)	Allan McGregor	44	2018 (Note: Players second spell at the club; 1st spell 1998–2012)	505	0	2023	Free	
2	DF	(England)	James Tavernier (captain)	34	2015	402	101	2026	£0.2m	
3	DF	(Turkey)	Rıdvan Yılmaz	25	2022	15	0	2027	£4m	
4	MF	(England)	John Lundstram	32	2021	100	9	2024	Free	
5	DF	(Sweden)	Filip Helander	33	2019	60	7	2023	£3.5m	
6	DF	(England)	Connor Goldson (vc)	33	2018	261	23	2026	£3m	
7	MF	(Romania)	Ianis Hagi	27	2020	97	16	2025	£3m	
8	MF	(Scotland)	Ryan Jack	34	2017	188	14	2024	Free	
9	FW	(Croatia)	Antonio Čolak	33	2022	39	18	2025	£1.8m	
10	MF	(Northern Ireland)	Steven Davis	41	2019 (Note: Players second spell at the club; 1st spell 2008–2012)	371	28	2023	Free	
11	FW	(Wales)	Tom Lawrence	32	2022	9	3	2025	Free	
13	MF	(England)	Todd Cantwell	28	2023	20	6	2026	£1.5m	
14	MF	(England)	Ryan Kent	29	2019	218	33	2023	£6.5m	
16	DF	(Scotland)	John Souttar	30	2022	13	1	2026	Free	
17	FW	(Wales)	Rabbi Matondo	26	2022	28	0	2026	£2.5m	
18	MF	(Finland)	Glen Kamara	30	2019 (Winter)	193	9	2025	£0.05m	
20	FW	(Colombia)	Alfredo Morelos	30	2017	269	124	2023	£1m	
23	FW	(Scotland)	Scott Wright	29	2021 (Winter)	84	8	2025	£0.15m	
24	MF	(Nigeria)	Nnamdi Ofoborh	26	2021	0	0	2025	Free	
25	FW	(Jamaica)	Kemar Roofe	33	2020	78	36	2024	£4.5m	
26	DF	(England)	Ben Davies	31	2022	38	0	2026	£4m	
28	GK	(Scotland)	Robby McCrorie	28	2015	6	0	2025	Youth system	
30	FW	(Zambia)	Fashion Sakala	29	2021	91	24	2025	Free	
31	DF	(Croatia)	Borna Barišić	33	2018	201	9	2024	£1.5m	
32	GK	(Scotland)	Kieran Wright	27	2016	0	0	2023	Youth system	
33	GK	(Scotland)	Jon McLaughlin	39	2020	46	0	2024	Free	
37	MF	(Canada)	Scott Arfield	37	2018	233	43	2023	Free	
38	DF	(Scotland)	Leon King	22	2020	31	0	2026	Youth system	
43	MF	(Belgium)	Nicolas Raskin	25	2023	16	0	2027	£1.75m	
44	DF	(Scotland)	Adam Devine	23	2020	10	0	2025	Youth system	
51	MF	(Scotland)	Alex Lowry	23	2021	14	2	2025	Youth system	
54	FW	(Northern Ireland)	Ross McCausland	23	2021	2	0	2024	Youth system	
58	MF	(Scotland)	Arron Lyall	22	2020	1	0	2024	Youth system	
69	FW	(Scotland)	Robbie Ure	22	2021	3	1	2023	Youth system	
71	FW	(United States)	Malik Tillman	24	2022	43	12	2023	Loan	
72	FW	(England)	Zak Lovelace	20	2022	2	0	2024	Cross-border compensation	
79	MF	(England)	Paul Nsio	20	2022	1	0	2024	Cross-border compensation	
91	FW	(England)	Archie Stevens	20	2022	1	0	2024	Cross-border compensation	
92	MF	(Scotland)	Bailey Rice	19	2022	1	0	2025	Undisclosed	

- Last updated: 27 May 2023

=== Transfers ===
==== In ====
===== First team =====
No.	Pos.	Nat.	Name	Age	Moving from	Type	Transfer window	Ends	Transfer fee	Source
16	DF	(Scotland)	John Souttar	25	Heart of Midlothian	Transfer	Summer	2026	Free	
9	FW	(Croatia)	Antonio Čolak	28	PAOK (Greece)	Transfer	Summer	2025	£1.8m	
11	FW	(Wales)	Tom Lawrence	28	Derby County (England)	Transfer	Summer	2025	Free	
17	FW	(Wales)	Rabbi Matondo	21	Schalke 04 (Germany)	Transfer	Summer	2026	£2.5m	
71	FW	(United States)	Malik Tillman	20	Bayern Munich (Germany)	Loan	Summer	2023	N/A	
26	DF	(England)	Ben Davies	26	Liverpool (England)	Transfer	Summer	2026	£3m	
3	DF	(Turkey)	Rıdvan Yılmaz	21	Beşiktaş (Turkey)	Transfer	Summer	2027	£4m	
13	MF	(England)	Todd Cantwell	24	Norwich City (England)	Transfer	Winter	2026	£1.5m	
43	MF	(Belgium)	Nicolas Raskin	21	Standard Liège (Belgium)	Transfer	Winter	2027	£1.75m	

===== Academy =====
No.	Pos.	Nat.	Name	Age	Moving from	Type	Transfer window	Ends	Transfer fee	Source
89	FW	(Scotland)	Cameron Cooper	16	Partick Thistle	Transfer	Summer	2025		
80	MF	(Austria)	Souleyman Mandey	17	Pulse Academy (England)	Transfer	Summer	2024		
82	GK	(Northern Ireland)	Mason Munn	16	Glentoran (Northern Ireland)	Transfer	Summer	2024		
79	MF	(England)	Paul Nsio	16	Lambeth Tigers (England)	Transfer	Summer	2024		
90	MF	(Scotland)	Kieron Willox	16	Inverness CT	Transfer	Summer	2024		
92	MF	(Scotland)	Bailey Rice	15	Motherwell	Transfer	Summer			
91	FW	(England)	Archie Stevens	16	AFC Wimbledon (England)	Transfer	Summer	2024		
	MF	(Scotland)	Cameron Bell	16	Everton (England)	Transfer	Summer	2024		
72	FW	(England)	Zak Lovelace	16	Millwall (England)	Transfer	Summer	2024	Cross-border compensation	
	FW	(Scotland)	Lancelot Pollard	15	Aberdeen	Transfer	Summer			
55	FW	(Scotland)	Connor Young	17	Hibernian	Transfer	Summer	2025	Undisclosed	
51	MF	(Nigeria)	Thompson Ishaka	18	Brooke House College Football Academy (England)	Transfer	Winter	2025		

==== Out ====
===== First team =====
No.	Pos.	Nat.	Name	Age	Moving to	Type	Transfer window	Transfer fee	Source
11	FW	(Switzerland)	Cedric Itten	25	BSC Young Boys (Switzerland)	Transfer	Summer	£1.5m	
26	DF	(Nigeria)	Leon Balogun	33	Queens Park Rangers (England)	End of contract	Summer	Free	
13	GK	(England)	Andy Firth	25	Connah's Quay Nomads (Wales)	End of contract	Summer	Free	
34	DF	(Scotland)	Lewis Mayo	22	Kilmarnock	Loan	Summer	N/A	
32	FW	(Scotland)	Jake Hastie	23	Hartlepool United (England)	Transfer	Summer	Undisclosed	
17	MF	(Nigeria)	Joe Aribo	25	Southampton (England)	Transfer	Summer	£7m	
51	MF	(Scotland)	Kai Kennedy	20	Falkirk	Loan	Summer	N/A	
3	DF	(Nigeria)	Calvin Bassey	22	Ajax (Netherlands)	Transfer	Summer	£20m	
41	FW	(Scotland)	Josh McPake	20	Queen's Park	Loan	Summer	N/A	
40	MF	(Scotland)	Glenn Middleton	22	Dundee United	Transfer	Summer	Undisclosed	
15	DF	(England)	Jack Simpson	25	Cardiff City (Wales)	Transfer	Summer	Undisclosed	
22	DF	(Poland)	Mateusz Żukowski	20	Lech Poznań (Poland)	Loan	Summer	N/A	
21	DF	(Croatia)	Nikola Katić	25	FC Zürich (Switzerland)	Transfer	Summer	Undisclosed	
27	MF	(Scotland)	Stephen Kelly	22	Livingston	Transfer	Summer	Nominal	
29	MF	(Northern Ireland)	Charlie McCann	20	Forest Green Rovers (England)	Transfer	Winter	Undisclosed	
19	MF	(United States)	James Sands	22	New York City FC (United States)	End of Loan	Winter	N/A	

===== Academy =====
No.	Pos.	Nat.	Name	Age	Moving to	Type	Transfer window	Transfer fee	Source
55	FW	(Northern Ireland)	Chris McKee	20	Linfield (Northern Ireland)	Transfer	Summer	Undisclosed	
63	DF	(Northern Ireland)	Kyle McClelland	20	Hibernian	End of contract	Summer	Training compensation	
	GK	(Scotland)	Scott Cowie	17	Hearts	End of contract	Summer	Free	
83	FW	(Scotland)	Rory Wilson	16	Aston Villa (England)	Transfer	Summer	Training compensation	
51	DF	(Scotland)	James Maxwell	20	Doncaster Rovers (England)	End of contract	Summer	Training compensation	
47	MF	(Australia)	Murray Miller	20	Alloa Athletic	Loan	Summer	N/A	
52	GK	(Scotland)	Jay Hogarth	18	Alloa Athletic	Loan	Summer	N/A	
56	FW	(England)	Tony Weston	18	Partick Thistle	Loan	Summer	N/A	
42	MF	(Scotland)	Cole McKinnon	19	Partick Thistle	Loan	Summer	N/A	
	MF	(Scotland)	Ben Williamson	20	Dundee	Loan	Summer	N/A	
45	FW	(Colombia)	Juan Alegría	20	Falkirk	Loan	Summer	N/A	
	MF	(Scotland)	Ryan Duncan	16	Hearts	Transfer	Summer	Free	
	GK	(Scotland)	Jack McConnell	18	Ayr United	Emergency Loan	Summer	N/A	
46	MF	(England)	Kane Ritchie-Hosler	20	Dunfermline Athletic	Loan	Summer	N/A	
63	DF	(Scotland)	Harley Ewen	18	Cumbernauld Colts	Loan	Summer	N/A	
56	FW	(England)	Tony Weston	19	Cove Rangers	Loan	Winter	N/A	
55	FW	(Scotland)	Connor Young	18	East Fife	Loan	Winter	N/A	
	GK	(United States)	Aaron Cervantes	21	LA Galaxy II (United States)	Transfer	Winter		
45	FW	(Colombia)	Juan Alegría	20	FC Honka (Finland)	Transfer	Winter	Undisclosed	

==== New contracts ====
===== First team =====
N	P	Nat.	Name	Age	Date signed	Contract length	Expiry date	Source
10	MF	(Northern Ireland)	Steven Davis	37	31 May	1 year	May 2023	
6	DF	(England)	Connor Goldson	29	1 June	4 years	May 2026	
1	GK	(Scotland)	Allan McGregor	40	20 June	1 year	May 2023	
34	DF	(Scotland)	Lewis Mayo	22	23 June	2 years	May 2024	
2	DF	(England)	James Tavernier	30	17 August	4 years	May 2026	
28	GK	(Scotland)	Robby McCrorie	24	6 October	3 years	May 2025	
38	DF	(Scotland)	Leon King	18	15 December	4 years	May 2026	
7	MF	(Romania)	Ianis Hagi	24	15 December	3 years	May 2025	
8	MF	(Scotland)	Ryan Jack	31	19 May	1 year	May 2024	

===== Academy =====
N	P	Nat.	Name	Age	Date signed	Contract length	Expiry date	Source
42	MF	(Scotland)	Cole McKinnon	19	29 June	3 years	May 2025	
52	GK	(Scotland)	Jay Hogarth	18	8 July	3 years	May 2025	
	MF	(Scotland)	Ben Williamson	20	15 July	2 years	May 2024	
68	MF	(Scotland)	Mackenzie Strachan	18	9 August	2 years	May 2024	
44	DF	(Scotland)	Adam Devine	19	9 October	3 years	May 2025	
60	DF	(Scotland)	Connor Allan	18	9 October	3 years	May 2025	
65	DF	(Scotland)	Jack Harkness	18	7 December	3 years	May 2025	
59	GK	(Scotland)	Jacob Pazikas	17	10 January	2 years	May 2025	
87	DF	(Scotland)	Leyton Grant	16	10 January	1 year	May 2024	
86	FW	(Scotland)	Findlay Curtis	16	10 January	1 year	May 2024	
74	DF	(Scotland)	Jamie Newton	17	10 January	6 months	May 2023	
67	MF	(Scotland)	Darren McInally	19	31 March	1 year	May 2024	
49	DF	(Scotland)	Robbie Fraser	20	9 May	1 year	May 2024	
64	FW	(Scotland)	James Graham	18	16 May	1 year	May 2024	
74	DF	(Scotland)	Jamie Newton	18	22 May	1 year	May 2024	
61	DF	(Scotland)	Greig Allen	17	23 May	2 years	May 2025	
58	MF	(Scotland)	Arron Lyall	19	24 May	1 year	May 2024	

=== Awards ===
N	P	Nat.	Name	Award	Date	From	Source
9	FW	(Nigeria)	Cyriel Dessers	Premiership Player of the Month	September/October	Scottish Professional Football League	
	MAN	(England)	Michael Beale	Premiership Manager of the Month	December	Scottish Professional Football League	
71	FW	(United States)	Malik Tillman	PFA Scotland Young Player of the Year	2022–23	PFA Scotland	

== Pre-season and friendlies ==
2 July 2022 Friendly	Rangers	3–2	Partick Thistle	Glasgow
12:00 (Note: All kick-offs UK time)	Lundstram 2'; Sakala 40'; McPake 85'	Report	Graham 15'; Smith 47'	Stadium: Rangers Training Centre
Note: The match was played behind closed doors.

9 July 2022 Friendly	Rangers	Abandoned	Sunderland	Albufeira, Portugal
20:00		Report		Stadium: Estádio Municipal de Albufeira; Referee: Hélder Malheiro
Note: Match was abandoned at h/t due to floodlight failure at the stadium.

16 July 2022 Friendly	Blackpool	1–2	Rangers	Blackpool, England
15:00	Lubala 89'	Report	Barišić 51'; McCann 76'	Stadium: Bloomfield Road; Referee: Leigh Doughty

19 July 2022 Friendly	Rangers	3–1	West Ham United	Glasgow
19:45	Lawrence 48'; Kent 49'; Matondo 58'	Report	Souček 70'	Stadium: Ibrox Stadium; Attendance: 33,846; Referee: Nick Walsh

23 July 2022 Friendly	Rangers	1–2	Tottenham Hotspur	Glasgow
15:00	Čolak 24'	Report	Kane 50', 56'	Stadium: Ibrox Stadium; Attendance: 43,036; Referee: John Beaton

24 July 2022 Friendly	Rangers	3–2	Queen's Park	Glasgow
12:00	Reid 47' (o.g.); Davis (penalty missed) 74'; Lovelace 78', 84'	Report	Williamson 27', 46'	Stadium: Rangers Training Centre
Note: The match was played behind closed doors.

10 December 2022 Friendly	Rangers	3–0	Bayer Leverkusen	Glasgow
13:00	Tillman 14', 21'; Tavernier (penalty missed) 81'; Arfield 84'	Report		Stadium: Ibrox Stadium; Attendance: 26,192; Referee: Don Robertson

== Competitions ==
Win Draw Loss Postponed

=== Overall ===
Competition	First match	Last match	Starting round	Final position	Record							
Competition	First match	Last match	Starting round	Final position	Pld	W	D	L	GF	GA	GD	Win %
Scottish Premiership	30 July 2022	27 May 2023	Matchday 1	2nd	38	29	5	4	93	37	+56	76.32
Scottish Cup	21 January 2023	30 April 2023	Fourth round	Semi-finalist	4	3	0	1	7	3	+4	75.00
Scottish League Cup	30 August 2022	26 February 2023	Second round	Runners-up	4	3	0	1	7	4	+3	75.00
UEFA Champions League	2 August 2022	1 November 2022	Third qualifying round	Group stage	10	2	1	7	8	26	−18	20.00
Total					56	37	6	13	115	70	+45	66.07

Last updated: 27 May 2023
Source: Competitions

=== Scottish Premiership ===
==== League table ====
Pos	Team	Pld	W	D	L	GF	GA	GD	Pts	Qualification or relegation (Note: Teams play each other three times (33 matches), before the league is split into two groups (the top six and the bottom six).)
1	Celtic (C)	38	32	3	3	114	34	+80	99	Qualification for the Champions League group stage
2	Rangers	38	29	5	4	93	37	+56	92	Qualification for the Champions League third qualifying round
3	Aberdeen	38	18	3	17	56	60	−4	57	Qualification for the Europa League play-off round
4	Heart of Midlothian	38	15	9	14	63	57	+6	54	Qualification for the Europa Conference League third qualifying round
5	Hibernian	38	15	7	16	57	59	−2	52	Qualification for the Europa Conference League second qualifying round

Rules for classification: 1) Points; 2) Goal difference; 3) Goals scored; 4) Head-to-Head points; 5) Head-to-Head goal difference; 6) Play-off (only if deciding champion, UEFA competitions qualification, second stage group allocation or relegation).
(C) Champions

==== Results by round ====
Round	1	2	3	4	5	6	7	8	9	10	11	12	13	14	15	16	17	18	19	20	21	22	23	24	25	26	27	28	29	30	31	32	33	34	35	36	37	38
Ground	A	H	H	A	H	A	H	A	H	A	H	H	A	H	A	H	A	A	H	H	A	A	H	A	H	A	H	A	A	H	A	H	A	H	H	A	H	A
Result	W	W	W	D	W	L	W	W	W	W	D	W	L	W	D	W	W	W	W	D	W	W	W	W	W	W	W	W	W	W	L	W	L	W	W	W	D	W
Position	3	2	2	2	2	2	2	2	2	2	2	2	2	2	2	2	2	2	2	2	2	2	2	2	2	2	2	2	2	2	2	2	2	2	2	2	2	2

Updated to match(es) played on 27 May 2023. Source:
A = Away; H = Home; W = Win; D = Draw; L = Loss

==== Matches ====
30 July 2022 1	Livingston	1–2	Rangers	Livingston
12:00	Nouble 5'; Cancar (yellow card) 24'; Se. Kelly (yellow card) 45'; George (yellow card) 64'	Report	Kamara (yellow card) 18'; Goldson (yellow card) 27'; Souttar (yellow card) 44'; Arfield 72'; Tavernier 74'; Čolak (yellow card) 80'	Stadium: Almondvale Stadium; Attendance: 9,672; Referee: Don Robertson

6 August 2022 2	Rangers	2–0	Kilmarnock	Glasgow
15:00	Čolak 51'; Morelos 88'	Report	Taylor (yellow card) 14'; Donnelly (yellow card) 38'; McKenzie (yellow card) 49'; Armstrong (yellow card) 82'; Murray (yellow card) 85'; Cameron (yellow card) 86'	Stadium: Ibrox Stadium; Attendance: 49,600; Referee: Kevin Clancy

13 August 2022 3	Rangers	4–0	St Johnstone	Glasgow
15:00	Tillman 32'; Goldson (yellow card) 53'; Čolak 62'; Arfield 80'; Lawrence 83'	Report	Montgomery (yellow card) 38'; Phillips (yellow card) 52'	Stadium: Ibrox Stadium; Attendance: 48,665; Referee: Nick Walsh

20 August 2022 4	Hibernian	2–2	Rangers	Edinburgh
12:30	Henderson (yellow card) 18'; Doyle-Hayes (yellow card) 25'; Bushiri (yellow card) 44'; Boyle 51'; Porteous (yellow card) 55'; Campbell 90+3'	Report	Goldson (yellow card) 20'; Tavernier 45' (pen.); Čolak (yellow card) 52'; Lawrence 58'; Lundstram (red card) 66'; Morelos (red card) 75'	Stadium: Easter Road; Attendance: 18,150; Referee: Willie Collum

27 August 2022 5	Rangers	4–0	Ross County	Glasgow
15:00	Sands (yellow card) 10'; Lundstram 24', (yellow card) 68'; Čolak 39', 58'; Davis 80'	Report	Loturi (yellow card) 15'; Johnson (yellow card) 57'	Stadium: Ibrox Stadium; Attendance: 48,899; Referee: Don Robertson

3 September 2022 6	Celtic	4–0	Rangers	Glasgow
12:30	Abada 8', 40'; Jota 32'; Carter-Vickers (yellow card) 44'; Starfelt (yellow card) 55'; Turnbull 78'; Giakoumakis (yellow card) 90'	Report	Barišić (yellow card) 19'; Tillman (yellow card) 30'; Goldson (yellow card) 90'	Stadium: Celtic Park; Attendance: 58,636; Referee: Nick Walsh

17 September 2022 7	Rangers	2–1	Dundee United	Glasgow
15:00	Čolak 8', 49'; Tavernier (yellow card) 37'; King (yellow card) 83'; Barišić (yellow card) 84'	Report	Middleton (yellow card) 42'; Smith 59'; Mulgrew (yellow card) 84'	Stadium: Ibrox Stadium; Attendance: 49,334; Referee: Kevin Clancy

1 October 2022 8	Heart of Midlothian	0–4	Rangers	Edinburgh
12:30	Devlin (red card) 39'; Humphrys (yellow card) 66'	Report	Čolak 6', 30'; Davies (yellow card) 14'; Tavernier (yellow card) 36'; Morelos 76'; Kent 90+1'	Stadium: Tynecastle Park; Attendance: 18,433; Referee: Steven McLean

8 October 2022 9	Rangers	4–0	St Mirren	Glasgow
15:00	Čolak 4', 73'; Tavernier 30' (pen.); Sakala 90+1'	Report	Main (yellow card) 38'; Dunne (yellow card) 69'	Stadium: Ibrox Stadium; Attendance: 49,274; Referee: Nick Walsh

16 October 2022 10	Motherwell	1–2	Rangers	Motherwell
12:00	Goss (yellow card) 45'; van Veen (yellow card) 55'; McKinstry 77'; Cornelius (yellow card) 90'	Report	Arfield (yellow card) 33'; Tillman 53'; Lundstram 69'; Wright (yellow card) 74'; Tavernier (yellow card) 75'; King (yellow card) 87'	Stadium: Fir Park; Attendance: 8,498; Referee: David Dickinson

22 October 2022 11	Rangers	1–1	Livingston	Glasgow
15:00	Tillman (yellow card) 44'; Sands (yellow card) 75'; Morelos (yellow card) 89'; Lundstram 90+1'	Report	Nouble 4'; Se. Kelly (yellow card) 40'; George (yellow card) 70'; Boyes (red card) 78'	Stadium: Ibrox Stadium; Attendance: 48,855; Referee: David Munro

29 October 2022 12	Rangers	4–1	Aberdeen	Glasgow
15:00	Čolak 27'; Lundstram 45+3'; Tavernier 51', (penalty missed) 60'; Morelos 85'	Report	Barron 21'; Ramadani (yellow card) 36'; Duncan (yellow card) 90+1'; Coulson (yellow card) 90+2'	Stadium: Ibrox Stadium; Attendance: 49,365; Referee: Nick Walsh

6 November 2022 13	St Johnstone	2–1	Rangers	Perth
12:00	Brown 41'; Montgomery (yellow card) 59'; Clark 62'; McLennan (yellow card) 90+4'	Report	Tavernier 74'	Stadium: McDiarmid Park; Attendance: 7,487; Referee: Steven McLean

9 November 2022 14	Rangers	1–0	Heart of Midlothian	Glasgow
19:45	Kent (yellow card) 58'; Tillman 66'; Barišić (yellow card) 84'; King (yellow card) 88'	Report	Halliday (yellow card) 45'	Stadium: Ibrox Stadium; Attendance: 48,376; Referee: John Beaton

12 November 2022 15	St Mirren	1–1	Rangers	Paisley
12:30	Ayunga 47'; Strain (yellow card) 66'; Main (yellow card) 90+5'	Report	Morelos (yellow card) 46'; Tavernier 84' (pen.)	Stadium: St Mirren Park; Attendance: 6,358; Referee: Kevin Clancy

Mid-season break for 2022 FIFA World Cup

15 December 2022 16	Rangers	3–2	Hibernian	Glasgow
20:00	Sakala 15'; Jack 58'; Morelos 62'; Davis (yellow card) 88'	Report	Porteous 8', (yellow card) 60'; Nisbet 16'; Magennis (yellow card) 38'; Stevenson (yellow card) 90'	Stadium: Ibrox Stadium; Attendance: 48,671; Referee: Nick Walsh

20 December 2022 17	Aberdeen	2–3	Rangers	Aberdeen
20:00	Ramadani (yellow card) 21'; Scales (yellow card) 24'; Barron (yellow card) 35'; Duk 45'; Clarkson 53'; Richardson (yellow card) 71'; Watkins (yellow card) 90+1'	Report	Sakala 12'; Jack (yellow card) 21'; Sands (yellow card) 42'; Lundstram (yellow card) 71'; Arfield (yellow card) 90', (goal) 90+5', 90+7'; Morelos (yellow card) 90+8'	Stadium: Pittodrie Stadium; Attendance: 18,025; Referee: Willie Collum
Note: This match was originally scheduled for 10 September 2022 but was postponed as a mark of respect due to the death of Queen Elizabeth II.

23 December 2022 18	Ross County	0–1	Rangers	Dingwall
19:30	Watson (yellow card) 28'; Loturi (yellow card) 86'	Report	Lundstram 35', (yellow card) 37'	Stadium: Victoria Park; Attendance: 6,051; Referee: Don Robertson

28 December 2022 19	Rangers	3–0	Motherwell	Glasgow
19:45	Morelos 13'; Goldson 39'; Lundstram (yellow card) 51'; Tillman (yellow card) 11', (goal) 63'	Report	Lamie (yellow card) 25'; Slattery (yellow card) 65'; Penney (yellow card) 89'	Stadium: Ibrox Stadium; Attendance: 49,605; Referee: David Dickinson

2 January 2023 20	Rangers	2–2	Celtic	Glasgow
12:30	Kent 47'; Tavernier 53' (pen.); Jack (yellow card) 90+4'	Report	Maeda 5'; Furuhashi 88'; Starfelt (yellow card) 90+3'	Stadium: Ibrox Stadium; Attendance: 50,066; Referee: John Beaton

8 January 2023 21	Dundee United	0–2	Rangers	Dundee
16:00	Freeman (yellow card) 90'	Report	Sakala 54'; Tillman 57'	Stadium: Tannadice Park; Attendance: 12,599; Referee: Steven McLean

18 January 2023 22	Kilmarnock	2–3	Rangers	Kilmarnock
20:00	Stokes 6'; Power (yellow card) 19'; Armstrong (yellow card) 35' (yellow-red card) 59'; Wright 85'	Report	Morelos 23', 72', (yellow card) 36'; Kent 51', (yellow card) 55'	Stadium: Rugby Park; Attendance: 8,461; Referee: Kevin Clancy

28 January 2023 23	Rangers	2–0	St Johnstone	Glasgow
15:00	Tavernier 15' (pen.); Jack (yellow card) 37'; Kamara 57'; Tillman (yellow card) 59'; Hagi (yellow card) 79'	Report	Clark (red card) 37'; Matthews (yellow card) 38'; Brown (yellow card) 44'; Phillips (yellow card) 79'	Stadium: Ibrox Stadium; Attendance: 49,672; Referee: Willie Collum

1 February 2023 24	Heart of Midlothian	0–3	Rangers	Edinburgh
19:45	Hill (yellow card) 32'; Snodgrass (yellow card) 80'; Cochrane (yellow card) 90+6'	Report	Morelos 9', 68'; Tillman 34'; Kent (yellow card) 51'; Barišić (yellow card) 74'; Lundstram (yellow card) 75'	Stadium: Tynecastle Park; Attendance: 18,330; Referee: John Beaton

4 February 2023 25	Rangers	2–1	Ross County	Glasgow
15:00	Davies (yellow card) 22'; Tillman 45+2'; Sakala (yellow card) 58'; Barišić 75'; Morelos (yellow card) 81'; Tavernier (yellow card) 87'	Report	Iacovitti (yellow card) 7'; White 65'; Watson (yellow card) 90+5'	Stadium: Ibrox Stadium; Attendance: 49,115; Referee: Euan Anderson

18 February 2023 26	Livingston	0–3	Rangers	Livingston
15:00	St. Kelly (yellow card) 38'; Oméonga (yellow card) 45+1' (yellow-red card) 77'; Holt (yellow card) 84'	Report	Tavernier 24' (pen.), 78', (yellow card) 72'; Roofe 85'	Stadium: Almondvale Stadium; Attendance: 8,752; Referee: David Dickinson

4 March 2023 27	Rangers	3–1	Kilmarnock	Glasgow
15:00	Goldson 6'; Sakala 25'; Tavernier 45' (pen.); Jack (yellow card) 54'	Report	Dorsett 60'; McKenzie (yellow card) 62'; Wright (yellow card) 74'	Stadium: Ibrox Stadium; Attendance: 49,545; Referee: Willie Collum

8 March 2023 28	Hibernian	1–4	Rangers	Edinburgh
19:45	Goldson 8' (o.g.); Stevenson (yellow card) 60'; Hanlon (yellow card) 75'	Report	Tavernier 12' (pen.); Čolak 34', 58'; Sakala 52'	Stadium: Easter Road; Attendance: 19,341; Referee: Don Robertson

18 March 2023 29	Motherwell	2–4	Rangers	Motherwell
12:30	van Veen 3'; Casey (yellow card) 20'; Slattery (yellow card) 25' (yellow-red card) 76'; Mugabi 59'	Report	Tavernier 23'; Jack (yellow card) 45'; Sakala 46'; Cantwell 63'; Tillman 69'	Stadium: Fir Park; Attendance: 8,610; Referee: Nick Walsh

1 April 2023 30	Rangers	2–0	Dundee United	Glasgow
15:00	Tillman 38', 55'; Tavernier (yellow card) 51'	Report	Niskanen (yellow card) 89'	Stadium: Ibrox Stadium; Attendance: 49,969; Referee: Don Robertson

8 April 2023 31	Celtic	3–2	Rangers	Glasgow
12:30	Carter-Vickers (yellow card) 8'; Furuhashi 26', 62'; McGregor (yellow card) 39'; O'Riley (yellow card) 44'; Mooy (yellow card) 47'; Jota 73'	Report	Raskin (yellow card) 39'; Tavernier 45', 78'; Cantwell (yellow card) 45+2'	Stadium: Celtic Park; Attendance: 59,621; Referee: Kevin Clancy

15 April 2023 32	Rangers	5–2	St Mirren	Glasgow
15:00	Tavernier (penalty missed) 5'; Cantwell 26', (yellow card) 58'; Lundstram (yellow card) 53'; Sakala 48'; Morelos 80', 81'; Arfield 86'	Report	O'Hara 45+2', 65'; Tanser (yellow card) 61'	Stadium: Ibrox Stadium; Attendance: 48,703; Referee: Steven McLean

23 April 2023 33	Aberdeen	2–0	Rangers	Aberdeen
16:30	Scales 48', (yellow card) 83'; Miovski 56'; Duk (yellow card) 86'	Report	Cantwell (yellow card) 38'	Stadium: Pittodrie Stadium; Attendance: 18,666; Referee: Nick Walsh

7 May 2023 34	Rangers	1–0	Aberdeen	Glasgow
15:00	Cantwell (yellow card) 32', (goal) 64'	Report	Scales (yellow card) 32'; MacDonald (yellow card) 90+1'	Stadium: Ibrox Stadium; Attendance: 46,961; Referee: John Beaton

13 May 2023 35	Rangers	3–0	Celtic	Glasgow
12:30	Cantwell 5'; Souttar 34'; Sakala 70'; Lundstram (yellow card) 75'	Report	McGregor (yellow card) 60'	Stadium: Ibrox Stadium; Attendance: 50,104; Referee: Steven McLean

21 May 2023 36	Hibernian	1–3	Rangers	Edinburgh
12:00	Doyle-Hayes (yellow card) 74'; Nisbet (yellow card) 83'; Hanlon 90+3'	Report	Tavernier 32'; Hagi 55'; Cantwell (yellow card) 74', (goal) 86'	Stadium: Easter Road; Attendance: 18,172; Referee: Alan Muir

24 May 2023 37	Rangers	2–2	Heart of Midlothian	Glasgow
19:45	McGregor (yellow card) 37'; Cantwell 45+3'; Sakala 47'; Yılmaz (yellow card) 55'; Morelos (yellow card) 58'	Report	Shankland 1'; Ginnelly (yellow card) 45+5'; Rowles (yellow card) 63'; Smith (yellow card) 78'; Kuol 90+4', (yellow card) 90+4'	Stadium: Ibrox Stadium; Attendance: 48,428; Referee: John Beaton

27 May 2023 38	St Mirren	0–3	Rangers	Paisley
12:30	Main (yellow card) 33'; Fraser (yellow card) 41'	Report	Sakala 26', 48'; Čolak 77', (yellow card) 78'	Stadium: St Mirren Park; Attendance: 7,490; Referee: Matthew MacDermid

=== Scottish Cup ===
21 January 2023 Fourth round	St Johnstone	0–1	Rangers	Perth
17:30	Phillips (yellow card) 83'	Report	Tillman (yellow card) 33'; Barišić 45'; Goldson (yellow card) 90+2'	Stadium: McDiarmid Park; Attendance: 7,855; Referee: Alan Muir

12 February 2023 Fifth round	Rangers	3–2	Partick Thistle	Glasgow
16:00	Čolak 50'; Tavernier (penalty missed) 65'; Tillman 71'; Barišić (yellow card) 72'; Kamara (yellow card) 79'; Sands 86'	Report	Holt 35' (pen.); Graham (yellow card) 44'; Milne (yellow card) 52'; Turner (yellow card) 52'; Tiffoney (yellow card) 72', (goal) 74'; Docherty (yellow card) 80'; Sneddon (yellow card) 82'	Stadium: Ibrox Stadium; Attendance: 44,636; Referee: David Munro

12 March 2023 Quarter-final	Rangers	3–0	Raith Rovers	Glasgow
13:00	Goldson 42'; Nolan 58' (o.g.); Lundstram (yellow card) 75'; Arfield 87'; Cantwell (yellow card) 90+1'	Report	Connolly (yellow card) 41'; Spencer (yellow card) 69'; Vaughan (yellow card) 90+1'	Stadium: Ibrox Stadium; Attendance: 41,168; Referee: John Beaton

30 April 2023 Semi-final	Rangers	0–1	Celtic	Glasgow
13:30	Barišić (yellow card) 27'; Cantwell (yellow card) 82'	Report	Jota 42'; Maeda (yellow card) 81'; McGregor (yellow card) 88'	Stadium: Hampden Park; Attendance: 49,839; Referee: Don Robertson

=== Scottish League Cup ===
30 August 2022 Second round	Rangers	3–1	Queen of the South	Glasgow
19:45	Ure 10'; Arfield 24', 86'; Kamara (yellow card) 48'	Report	Connelly 17'; Paton (yellow card) 20'; McKay (yellow card) 81'	Stadium: Ibrox Stadium; Attendance: 30,569; Referee: David Dickinson

19 October 2022 Quarter-final	Rangers	1–0	Dundee	Glasgow
20:15	Davis 10'; Sakala (yellow card) 64'; Sands (yellow card) 82'	Report	Mulligan (yellow card) 49'; Kerr (yellow card) 64'	Stadium: Ibrox Stadium; Attendance: 37,107; Referee: Willie Collum

15 January 2023 Semi-final	Rangers	2–1 (a.e.t.)	Aberdeen	Glasgow
15:00	Jack 61'; Barišić (yellow card) 87'; Goldson (yellow card) 90+9'; Roofe 94'; McCann (yellow card) 119'	Report	Miovski 40'; McCrorie (yellow card) 70'; Kennedy (yellow card) 88'; Stewart (red card) 90+3'; Ramadani (yellow card) 120+2'	Stadium: Hampden Park; Attendance: 47,562; Referee: Nick Walsh

26 February 2023 Final	Rangers	1–2	Celtic	Glasgow
15:00	Lundstram (yellow card) 50'; Kamara (yellow card) 58'; Morelos 64'; Kent (yellow card) 90'; Barišić (yellow card) 90'; Čolak (yellow card) 90+1'; Cantwell (yellow card) 90+4'	Report	Furuhashi 44', 56'; Taylor (yellow card) 70'; Oh (yellow card) 79'; Abada (yellow card) 83'; Johnston (yellow card) 90+1'	Stadium: Hampden Park; Attendance: 49,529; Referee: Nick Walsh

=== UEFA Champions League ===
==== Third qualifying round ====
2 August 2022 First leg	Union Saint-Gilloise (Belgium)	2–0	(Scotland) Rangers	Leuven, Belgium
19:45	Teuma 27'; Vanzeir 76' (pen.); Lynen (yellow card) 80'	Report	Sands (yellow card) 39'; Goldson (yellow card) 74'; Davies (yellow card) 79'; Lawrence (yellow card) 90+1'	Stadium: Den Dreef (Note: Union Saint-Gilloise played their home match at Den Dreef, Leuven, instead of their regular stadium Joseph Marien Stadium, Brussels which did not meet UEFA requirements.); Attendance: 1,100; Referee: Irfan Peljto (Bosnia and Herzegovina)

9 August 2022 Second leg	Rangers (Scotland)	3–0 (3–2 agg.)	(Belgium) Union Saint-Gilloise	Glasgow
19:45	Sands (yellow card) 38'; Tavernier 45' (pen.); Čolak (yellow card) 45', (goal) 58'; Lawrence (yellow card) 75'; Tillman (yellow card) 41', (goal) 79'; Barišić (yellow card) 90'	Report	Sykes (yellow card) 40'; Moris (yellow card) 45'; Adingra (yellow card) 55'; Lapoussin (yellow card) 90+4'; Lazare (yellow card) 75' (yellow-red card) 90+4'	Stadium: Ibrox Stadium; Attendance: 48,454; Referee: Anastasios Sidiropoulos (Greece)

==== Play-off round ====
16 August 2022 First leg	Rangers (Scotland)	2–2	(Netherlands) PSV Eindhoven	Glasgow
20:00	Čolak 40'; Goldson (yellow card) 57'; Lawrence 70'	Report	Sangaré 37'; De Jong (yellow card) 53'; Saibari (yellow card) 68'; Obispo (yellow card) 50', (goal) 78'	Stadium: Ibrox Stadium; Attendance: 49,097; Referee: Daniele Orsato (Italy)

24 August 2022 Second leg	PSV Eindhoven (Netherlands)	0–1 (2–3 agg.)	(Scotland) Rangers	Eindhoven, Netherlands
20:00	Ramalho (yellow card) 27'; Mwene (yellow card) 68'; Obispo (yellow card) 84'; Van Ginkel (yellow card) 88'; Simons (yellow card) 90+5'	Report	Čolak 60'; Lundstram (yellow card) 64'; Kent (yellow card) 66'; Barišić (yellow card) 72'	Stadium: Philips Stadion; Attendance: 34,893; Referee: Szymon Marciniak (Poland)

==== Group stage ====
Pos	Team	Pld	W	D	L	GF	GA	GD	Pts	Qualification	NAP	LIV	AJX	RAN
1	(Italy) Napoli	6	5	0	1	20	6	+14	15 (Note: Tied on head-to-head points. Head-to-head goal difference: Napoli +1, Liverpool −1.)	Advance to knockout phase	—	4–1	4–2	3–0
2	(England) Liverpool	6	5	0	1	17	6	+11	15	Advance to knockout phase	2–0	—	2–1	2–0
3	(Netherlands) Ajax	6	2	0	4	11	16	−5	6	Transfer to Europa League	1–6	0–3	—	4–0
4	(Scotland) Rangers	6	0	0	6	2	22	−20	0		0–3	1–7	1–3	—

Source: UEFA
Rules for classification: Group stage tiebreakers
Notes:

7 September 2022 1	Ajax (Netherlands)	4–0	(Scotland) Rangers	Amsterdam, Netherlands
17:45	Álvarez 17'; Berghuis 32'; Kudus 33'; Bergwijn 80'	Report	Jack (yellow card) 63'	Stadium: Johan Cruyff Arena; Attendance: 52,862; Referee: Tobias Stieler (Germany)

14 September 2022 2	Rangers (Scotland)	0–3	(Italy) Napoli	Glasgow
20:00	Morelos (yellow card) 21'; Lundstram (yellow card) 35'; Sands (yellow card) 53' (yellow-red card) 55'; Barišić (yellow card) 67'; Tavernier (yellow card) 74'	Report	Politano (yellow card) 42', (goal) 68' (pen.); Zieliński (penalty missed) 60'; Raspadori 85'; Ndombele 90+1'	Stadium: Ibrox Stadium; Attendance: 50,121; Referee: Antonio Mateu Lahoz (Spain)

4 October 2022 3	Liverpool (England)	2–0	(Scotland) Rangers	Liverpool, England
20:00	Alexander-Arnold 7', (yellow card) 90+3'; Salah 53' (pen.)	Report	Lundstram (yellow card) 37'	Stadium: Anfield; Attendance: 49,512; Referee: Clément Turpin (France)

12 October 2022 4	Rangers (Scotland)	1–7	(England) Liverpool	Glasgow
20:00	Arfield 17'	Report	Firmino 24', 55'; Núñez 66'; Salah 76', 80', 81'; Elliott 87'; Gomez (yellow card) 90'	Stadium: Ibrox Stadium; Attendance: 48,820; Referee: Slavko Vinčić (Slovenia)

26 October 2022 5	Napoli (Italy)	3–0	(Scotland) Rangers	Naples, Italy
20:00	Simeone 11', 16'; Østigård 80'; Kim (yellow card) 88'; Mário Rui (yellow card) 90'	Report	Davies (yellow card) 9'; Lundstram (yellow card) 42'	Stadium: Stadio Diego Armando Maradona; Attendance: 39,835; Referee: Halil Umut Meler (Turkey)

1 November 2022 6	Rangers (Scotland)	1–3	(Netherlands) Ajax	Glasgow
20:00	Tavernier 87' (pen.)	Report	Berghuis 4'; Taylor (yellow card) 19'; Kudus 29'; Rensch (yellow card) 55'; Conceição 89', (yellow card) 90+3'	Stadium: Ibrox Stadium; Attendance: 48,817; Referee: Glenn Nyberg (Sweden)

== Club ==
=== First Team Staff ===
Name	Role
Manager	(Netherlands) Giovanni van Bronckhorst (until 21 November 2022) (England) Michael Beale
Assistant Manager	(Netherlands) Dave Vos (until 21 November 2022) (England) Neil Banfield
First Team Coach	(Netherlands) Roy Makaay (until 21 November 2022) (England) Damian Matthew
Goalkeeping Coach	(Scotland) Colin Stewart
Head of Preparation	(Scotland) Craig Flannigan
Head of Strength and Conditioning	(Greece) Paraskevas Polychronopoulos
Physiotherapist	(England) Steve Walker
Masseur	(Scotland) David Lavery
Kit Executive	(Scotland) Jim McAlister

=== Club Staff ===
Name	Role
Honorary Life President	(Scotland) John Greig
Director of Football	(Scotland) Ross Wilson
Head of Academy	(Scotland) Craig Mulholland
Supporters Liaison Officer	(Scotland) Greg Marshall

=== Board of Directors – Rangers International Football Club Plc ===
Name	Role
Chairman	(Scotland) Douglas Park (until 3 April 2023) (Scotland) John Bennett
Deputy Chairman	(Scotland) John Bennett
Company Secretary	(Scotland) James Blair
Non-Executive Director	(Scotland) John Bennett
Non-Executive Director	(Scotland) Alastair Johnston
Non-Executive Director	(Scotland) Graeme Park
Non-Executive Director	(Scotland) Barry Scott
Non-Executive Director	(Denmark) Julian Wolhardt

=== Board of Directors – The Rangers Football Club Ltd ===
Name	Role
Managing Director	(Scotland) Stewart Robertson
Company Secretary	(Scotland) James Blair
Director of Finance and Administration	(Scotland) Andrew Dickson

== Squad statistics ==
The table below includes all players registered with the SPFL as part of the Rangers squad for the 2022–23 season. They may not have made an appearance.

=== Appearances and goals ===
No.	Pos.	Nat.	Name	Totals		Scottish Premiership		Scottish Cup		League Cup		Champions League	
No.	Pos.	Nat.	Name	Apps	Goals	Apps	Goals	Apps	Goals	Apps	Goals	Apps	Goals
Goalkeepers
1	GK	(Scotland) SCO	Allan McGregor	36	0	24	0	4	0	3	0	5	0
28	GK	(Scotland) SCO	Robby McCrorie	4	0	4	0	0	0	0	0	0	0
32	GK	(Scotland) SCO	Kieran Wright	0	0	0	0	0	0	0	0	0	0
33	GK	(Scotland) SCO	Jon McLaughlin	16	0	10	0	0	0	1	0	5	0
Defenders
2	DF	(England) ENG	James Tavernier (captain)	55	18	38	16	4	0	3	0	10	2
3	DF	(Turkey) TUR	Rıdvan Yılmaz	15	0	8+1	0	0+2	0	2	0	1+1	0
5	DF	(Sweden) SWE	Filip Helander	0	0	0	0	0	0	0	0	0	0
6	DF	(England) ENG	Connor Goldson (vc)	38	3	25	2	3	1	2	0	8	0
16	DF	(Scotland) SCO	John Souttar	13	1	8+4	1	0+1	0	0	0	0	0
26	DF	(England) ENG	Ben Davies	38	0	25+2	0	4	0	2	0	3+2	0
31	DF	(Croatia) CRO	Borna Barišić	46	2	27+3	1	4	1	2	0	9+1	0
38	DF	(Scotland) SCO	Leon King	23	0	9+6	0	0	0	2	0	3+3	0
44	DF	(Scotland) SCO	Adam Devine	8	0	3+3	0	0	0	1+1	0	0	0
Midfielders
4	MF	(England) ENG	John Lundstram	52	5	33+4	5	3	0	3	0	9	0
7	MF	(Romania) ROU	Ianis Hagi	11	1	3+5	1	1+2	0	0	0	0	0
8	MF	(Scotland) SCO	Ryan Jack	36	2	19+7	1	1+1	0	2+1	1	3+2	0
10	MF	(Northern Ireland) NIR	Steven Davis	16	2	3+5	1	0	0	2	1	4+2	0
13	MF	(England) ENG	Todd Cantwell	20	6	15+1	6	3	0	0+1	0	0	0
14	MF	(England) ENG	Ryan Kent	44	3	28+1	3	3+1	0	2	0	9	0
18	MF	(Finland) FIN	Glen Kamara	35	1	12+10	1	1+1	0	2+1	0	3+5	0
24	MF	(Nigeria) NGR	Nnamdi Ofoborh	0	0	0	0	0	0	0	0	0	0
37	MF	(Canada) CAN	Scott Arfield	43	9	7+24	5	0+3	1	1+2	2	4+2	1
43	MF	(Belgium) BEL	Nicolas Raskin	16	0	11+1	0	3	0	0+1	0	0	0
51	MF	(Scotland) SCO	Alex Lowry	7	0	1+4	0	0+1	0	0	0	0+1	0
58	MF	(Scotland) SCO	Arron Lyall	1	0	0+1	0	0	0	0	0	0	0
79	MF	(England) ENG	Paul Nsio	1	0	0	0	0	0	0+1	0	0	0
92	MF	(Scotland) SCO	Bailey Rice	1	0	0+1	0	0	0	0	0	0	0
Forwards
9	FW	(Croatia) CRO	Antonio Čolak	39	18	18+7	14	2+1	1	0+1	0	7+3	3
11	FW	(Wales) WAL	Tom Lawrence	9	3	4+1	2	0	0	0	0	3+1	1
17	FW	(Wales) WAL	Rabbi Matondo	28	0	9+10	0	0+1	0	1	0	1+6	0
20	FW	(Colombia) COL	Alfredo Morelos	45	12	15+17	11	2+2	0	3	1	3+3	0
23	FW	(Scotland) SCO	Scott Wright	34	0	5+18	0	0+1	0	1+2	0	2+5	0
25	FW	(Jamaica) JAM	Kemar Roofe	6	2	0+3	1	0+1	0	0+2	1	0	0
30	FW	(Zambia) ZAM	Fashion Sakala	41	12	22+7	12	2+1	0	4	0	2+3	0
54	FW	(Northern Ireland) NIR	Ross McCausland	1	0	0+1	0	0	0	0	0	0	0
69	FW	(Scotland) SCO	Robbie Ure	3	1	0+2	0	0	0	1	1	0	0
71	FW	(United States) USA	Malik Tillman	43	12	22+6	10	3	1	3	0	8+1	1
72	FW	(England) ENG	Zak Lovelace	2	0	0+1	0	0	0	0+1	0	0	0
91	FW	(England) ENG	Archie Stevens	1	0	0	0	0	0	0+1	0	0	0
Players transferred or loaned out during the season who made an appearance
19	MF	(United States) USA	James Sands	27	1	10+7	0	1	1	1	0	8	0
29	MF	(Northern Ireland) NIR	Charlie McCann	4	0	1	0	0	0	0+3	0	0	0

- Last updated: 27 May 2023

Appearances (starts and substitute appearances) and goals include those in Scottish Premiership, Scottish Cup, Scottish League Cup and UEFA Champions League.

=== Discipline ===
==== Yellow cards ====
As of match played on 27 May 2023

Colour	Player	Cards
Yellow card
Yellow card	John Lundstram	13
Yellow card	Borna Barišić	11
Yellow card	Todd Cantwell	8
Yellow card	Connor Goldson	8
Yellow card	James Sands	8
Yellow card	Alfredo Morelos	7
Yellow card	James Tavernier	7
Yellow card	Antonio Čolak	6
Yellow card	Ryan Jack	6
Yellow card	Ryan Kent	6
Yellow card	Malik Tillman	6
Yellow card	Ben Davies	4
Yellow card	Glen Kamara	4
Yellow card	Leon King	3
Yellow card	Scott Arfield	2
Yellow card	Tom Lawrence	2
Yellow card	Fashion Sakala	2
Yellow card	Steven Davis	1
Yellow card	Ianis Hagi	1
Yellow card	Charlie McCann	1
Yellow card	Allan McGregor	1
Yellow card	Nicolas Raskin	1
Yellow card	John Souttar	1
Yellow card	Scott Wright	1
Yellow card	Rıdvan Yılmaz	1

==== Red cards ====
As of match played on 27 May 2023

Colour	Player	Cards
Red card
Red card	John Lundstram	1
Red card	Alfredo Morelos	1
Red card	James Sands	1

=== Clean sheets ===
As of match played on 27 May 2023

No.	Player	Scottish Premiership	Scottish Cup	League Cup	Champions League	Total	Appearances
1	Allan McGregor	8	2	0	0	10	36
28	Robby McCrorie	3	0	0	0	3	4
32	Kieran Wright	0	0	0	0	0	0
33	Jon McLaughlin	5	0	1	2	8	16
Total		16	2	1	2	21	56
