= 2023–24 Rangers F.C. season =

Rangers
2023–24 season
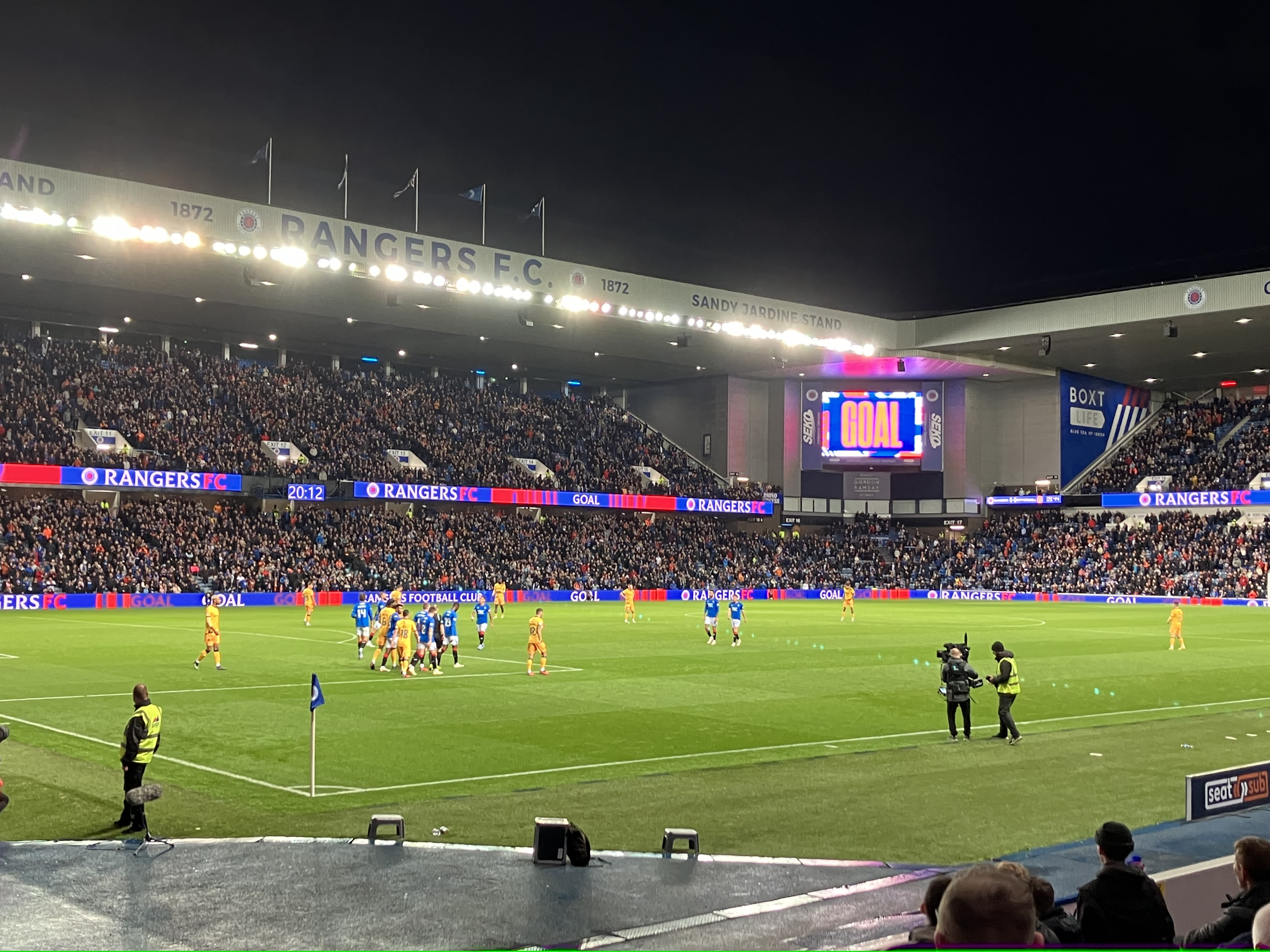
- Rangers vs Livingston at Ibrox Stadium, 27 September 2023
- Chairman: John Bennett
- Manager: Michael Beale (until 1 October); Steven Davis (caretaker; until 15 October); Philippe Clement (from 15 October)
- Stadium: Ibrox Stadium
- Scottish Premiership: 2nd
- Scottish Cup: Runners-up
- League Cup: Winners
- Champions League: Play-off round
- Europa League: Round of 16
- Top goalscorer: League: James Tavernier (17); All: James Tavernier (24)
- Highest home attendance: 50,936 vs Celtic; 7 April 2024
- Lowest home attendance: 35,420 vs Livingston; 27 September 2023
- Average home league attendance: 49,140
- Biggest win: 5–0 vs Dundee; 1 November 2023; 5–0 vs Hearts; 24 February 2024
- Biggest defeat: 1–5 vs PSV Eindhoven; 30 August 2023
Home colours	Away colours	Third colours

The 2023–24 season was the 144th season of competitive football by Rangers.

== Players ==
=== Squad information ===
N	Pos.	Nat.	Name	Age	Since	App	Goals	Ends	Transfer fee	Notes
1	GK	(England)	Jack Butland	33	2023	58	0	2027	Free	
2	DF	(England)	James Tavernier (captain)	34	2015	460	125	2026	£0.2m	
3	DF	(Turkey)	Rıdvan Yılmaz	25	2022	48	2	2027	£3.4m	
4	MF	(England)	John Lundstram	32	2021	153	11	2024	Free	
5	DF	(Scotland)	John Souttar	30	2022	54	3	2026	Free	
6	DF	(England)	Connor Goldson (vc)	33	2018	309	23	2026	£3m	
7	FW	(Portugal)	Fábio Silva	24	2024	25	6	2024	Loan	
8	MF	(Scotland)	Ryan Jack	34	2017	210	16	2024	Free	
9	FW	(Nigeria)	Cyriel Dessers	31	2023	54	22	2027	Undisclosed	
11	FW	(Wales)	Tom Lawrence	32	2022	41	6	2025	Free	
13	MF	(England)	Todd Cantwell	28	2023	64	14	2026	£1.5m	
16	FW	(Colombia)	Óscar Cortés	22	2024	7	1	2024	Loan	
17	FW	(Wales)	Rabbi Matondo	26	2022	59	6	2026	£2.5m	
19	FW	(Senegal)	Abdallah Sima	25	2023	40	16	2024	Loan	
20	MF	(England)	Kieran Dowell	28	2023	16	2	2026	Free	
21	DF	(England)	Dujon Sterling	26	2023	36	1	2027	Free	
23	FW	(Scotland)	Scott Wright	29	2021 (Winter)	117	12	2025	£0.15m	
25	FW	(Jamaica)	Kemar Roofe	33	2020	102	38	2024	£4.5m	
26	DF	(England)	Ben Davies	31	2022	55	1	2026	£3m	
27	DF	(Nigeria)	Leon Balogun	38	2023 (Note: Players second spell at the club; 1st spell 2020–2022)	84	2	2024	Free	
28	GK	(Scotland)	Robby McCrorie	28	2015	7	0	2025	Youth system	
31	DF	(Croatia)	Borna Barišić	33	2018	236	10	2024	£1.5m	
32	GK	(Scotland)	Kieran Wright	27	2016	0	0	2025	Youth system	
33	GK	(Scotland)	Jon McLaughlin	39	2020	46	0	2024	Free	
38	DF	(Scotland)	Leon King	22	2020	37	0	2026	Youth system	
42	MF	(Ivory Coast)	Mohamed Diomande	24	2024	19	2	2028	Loan	
43	MF	(Belgium)	Nicolas Raskin	25	2023	47	1	2027	£1.75m	
45	FW	(Northern Ireland)	Ross McCausland	23	2021	41	4	2027	Youth system	
46	DF	(England)	Johnly Yfeko	23	2022	1	0	2026	Free	
47	DF	(Scotland)	Robbie Fraser	23	2021	2	0	2024	Youth system	
51	MF	(Scotland)	Alex Lowry	23	2021	14	2	2025	Youth system	
57	FW	(England)	Archie Stevens	20	2022	1	0	2024	Cross-border compensation	
61	MF	(England)	Paul Nsio	20	2022	1	0	2026	Cross-border compensation	
64	MF	(Scotland)	Bailey Rice	19	2022	3	0	2026	Undisclosed	
65	FW	(England)	Zak Lovelace	20	2022	4	0	2025	Cross-border compensation	
93	MF	(Scotland)	Cole McKinnon	23	2021	4	1	2025	Youth system	
99	FW	(Brazil)	Danilo	27	2023	21	6	2028	£5.6M	

- Last updated: 25 May 2024

=== Transfers ===
==== In ====
===== First team =====
No.	Pos.	Nat.	Name	Age	Moving from	Type	Transfer window	Ends	Transfer fee	Source
20	MF	(England)	Kieran Dowell	25	Norwich City (England)	Transfer	Summer	2026	Free	
21	DF	(England)	Dujon Sterling	23	Chelsea (England)	Transfer	Summer	2027	Free	
1	GK	(England)	Jack Butland	30	Crystal Palace (England)	Transfer	Summer	2027	Free	
14	FW	(Netherlands)	Sam Lammers	26	Atalanta (Italy)	Transfer	Summer	2027	£3.5m	
19	FW	(Senegal)	Abdallah Sima	22	Brighton & Hove Albion (England)	Loan	Summer	2024	N/A	
9	FW	(Nigeria)	Cyriel Dessers	28	Cremonese (Italy)	Transfer	Summer	2027	Undisclosed	
27	DF	(Nigeria)	Leon Balogun	35	Queens Park Rangers (England)	Transfer	Summer	2024	Free	
99	FW	(Brazil)	Danilo	24	Feyenoord (Netherlands)	Transfer	Summer	2028	£5.6m	
15	MF	(Ecuador)	José Cifuentes	24	Los Angeles FC (United States)	Transfer	Summer	2027	£1.2m	
7	FW	(Portugal)	Fábio Silva	21	Wolverhampton Wanderers (England)	Loan	Winter	2024	N/A	
42	MF	(Ivory Coast)	Mohamed Diomande	22	FC Nordsjælland (Denmark)	Loan	Winter	2028	Loan	
16	FW	(Colombia)	Óscar Cortés	20	RC Lens (France)	Loan	Winter	2024	N/A	

===== Academy =====
No.	Pos.	Nat.	Name	Age	Moving from	Type	Transfer window	Ends	Transfer fee	Source
–	FW	(Montserrat)	Arian Allen	16	Everton (England)	Transfer	Winter	2025	Free	

==== Out ====
===== First team =====
No.	Pos.	Nat.	Name	Age	Moving to	Type	Transfer window	Transfer fee	Source
1	GK	(Scotland)	Allan McGregor	41	Retired	End of contract	Summer	Free	
5	DF	(Sweden)	Filip Helander	30	Odense (Denmark)	End of contract	Summer	Free	
14	MF	(England)	Ryan Kent	26	Fenerbahçe (Turkey)	End of contract	Summer	Free	
20	FW	(Colombia)	Alfredo Morelos	26	Santos (Brazil)	End of contract	Summer	Free	
37	MF	(Canada)	Scott Arfield	34	Charlotte FC (United States)	End of contract	Summer	Free	
22	DF	(Poland)	Mateusz Żukowski	21	Śląsk Wrocław (Poland)	Transfer	Summer	Undisclosed	
9	FW	(Croatia)	Antonio Čolak	29	Parma (Italy)	Transfer	Summer	£2.5m	
41	MF	(Scotland)	Ben Williamson	21	Partick Thistle	Loan	Summer	N/A	
34	DF	(Scotland)	Lewis Mayo	23	Kilmarnock	Transfer	Summer	Undisclosed	
51	MF	(Scotland)	Alex Lowry	20	Heart of Midlothian	Loan	Summer	N/A	
30	FW	(Zambia)	Fashion Sakala	26	Al-Fayha (Saudi Arabia)	Transfer	Summer	£4m	
24	MF	(Nigeria)	Nnamdi Ofoborh	23	Swindon Town (England)	Released	Summer	Free	
7	MF	(Romania)	Ianis Hagi	24	Alavés (Spain)	Loan	Summer	N/A	
18	MF	(Finland)	Glen Kamara	27	Leeds United (England)	Transfer	Summer	£5m	
–	MF	(Scotland)	Ben Williamson	22	Hamilton Academical	Transfer	Winter	Undisclosed	
14	FW	(Netherlands)	Sam Lammers	26	Utrecht (Netherlands)	Loan	Winter	N/A	
10	MF	(Northern Ireland)	Steven Davis	39	Retired	End of contract	Winter	Free	
44	DF	(Scotland)	Adam Devine	20	Motherwell	Loan	Winter	N/A	
15	MF	(Ecuador)	José Cifuentes	24	Cruzeiro (Brazil)	Loan	Winter	N/A	
32	GK	(Scotland)	Kieran Wright	25	Livingston	Emergency Loan	Winter	N/A	

===== Academy =====
No.	Pos.	Nat.	Name	Age	Moving to	Type	Transfer window	Transfer fee	Source
46	MF	(England)	Kane Ritchie-Hosler	20	Dunfermline Athletic	Transfer	Summer	Undisclosed	
–	MF	(Scotland)	Kai Kennedy	21	York City (England)	End of contract	Summer	Free	
56	FW	(England)	Tony Weston	19	Derby County (England)	End of contract	Summer	Free	
47	MF	(Australia)	Murray Miller	21	Stirling Albion	End of contract	Summer	Free	
70	DF	(Romania)	Kevin Ciubotaru	19	FC Hermannstadt (Romania)	End of contract	Summer	Free	
66	MF	(Northern Ireland)	Charlie Lindsay	19	Derby County (England)	End of contract	Summer	Free	
57	DF	(Northern Ireland)	Lewis MacKinnon	20	Carrick Rangers (Northern Ireland)	End of contract	Summer	Free	
62	DF	(Scotland)	Kelsey Ewen	18	Edinburgh City	End of contract	Summer	Free	
63	DF	(Scotland)	Harley Ewen	18	Cumbernauld Colts	End of contract	Summer	Free	
71	DF	(England)	Alex Kpakpé	19	Hitchin Town (England)	End of contract	Summer	Free	
69	FW	(Scotland)	Robbie Ure	19	Anderlecht (Belgium)	End of contract	Summer	Free	
81	GK	(Scotland)	Sam Kane	17	Queen's Park	Transfer	Summer	Free	
73	DF	(Scotland)	Zak McKay	18	Stenhousemuir	End of contract	Summer	Free	
78	MF	(Uganda)	Christian Mulindwa	17	Stockport County (England)	End of contract	Summer	Free	
89	FW	(Scotland)	Cameron Cooper	17	Oxford United (England)	End of contract	Summer	Free	
–	FW	(England)	Jack Roberts	18	Braintree Town (England)	End of contract	Summer	Free	
69	GK	(Scotland)	Jacob Pazikas	18	Civil Service Strollers	Loan	Summer	N/A	
59	DF	(Scotland)	Kristian Webster	18	Cumbernauld Colts	Loan	Summer	N/A	
92	FW	(Scotland)	James Graham	19	Annan Athletic	Loan	Summer	N/A	
42	FW	(Scotland)	Josh McPake	22	Stirling Albion	Released	Summer	N/A	
71	FW	(Scotland)	Connor Young	19	Clyde	Released	Summer	N/A	
41	GK	(Scotland)	Lewis Budinauckas	21	Stranraer	Loan	Summer	N/A	
54	MF	(Scotland)	Mackenzie Strachan	19	Stranraer	Loan	Summer	N/A	
53	DF	(Scotland)	Jack Harkness	19	Greenock Morton	Loan	Summer	N/A	
49	GK	(Scotland)	Jay Hogarth	20	Dumbarton	Loan	Winter	N/A	
67	DF	(Scotland)	Jamie Newton	18	Nottingham Forest (England)	Transfer	Winter	Undisclosed	
48	MF	(Scotland)	Arron Lyall	20	Airdrieonians	Loan	Winter	N/A	
92	FW	(Scotland)	James Graham	19	Dumbarton	Loan	Winter	N/A	
56	FW	(United States)	Tyler Pasnik	19	Huntsville City FC (United States)	Transfer	Winter	Free	

==== New contracts ====
===== First team =====
N	P	Nat.	Name	Age	Date signed	Contract length	Expiry date	Source
32	GK	(Scotland)	Kieran Wright	24	29 May	2 years	May 2025	

===== Academy =====
N	P	Nat.	Name	Age	Date signed	Contract length	Expiry date	Source
59	DF	(Scotland)	Kristian Webster	18	12 July	1 year	May 2024	
64	MF	(Scotland)	Bailey Rice	16	12 September	3 years	May 2026	
46	DF	(England)	Johnly Yfeko	20	10 November	3 years	May 2026	
45	FW	(Northern Ireland)	Ross McCausland	20	28 November	4 years	May 2027	
61	MF	(England)	Paul Nsio	17	29 November	3 years	May 2026	

=== Awards ===
N	P	Nat.	Name	Award	Date	From	Source
19	FW	(Senegal)	Abdallah Sima	Premiership Player of the Month	October	Scottish Professional Football League	
	MAN	(Belgium)	Philippe Clement	Premiership Manager of the Month	January	Scottish Professional Football League	
	MAN	(Belgium)	Philippe Clement	Premiership Manager of the Month	February	Scottish Professional Football League	

== Pre-season and friendlies ==
7 July 2023 Friendly	Rangers	0–0	Livingston	Milngavie
		Report		Stadium: Rangers Training Centre
Note: The match was played behind closed doors.

14 July 2023 Friendly	Hallescher FC	0–2	Rangers	Blankenhain, Germany
15:00 CEST (UTC+2)		Report	Sima 30'; Tavernier 35' (pen.)	Stadium: Spa & GolfResort Weimarer Land

18 July 2023 Friendly	Rangers	1–2	Newcastle United	Glasgow
19:45 BST (UTC+1)	Lammers 64'	Report	Almirón 16'; Ashby 87'	Stadium: Ibrox Stadium; Attendance: 50,118; Referee: David Dickinson
Note: Testimonial match for Allan McGregor

22 July 2023 Friendly	Rangers	2–1	Hamburger SV	Glasgow
15:00 BST (UTC+1)	Sakala 38'; Tavernier 45' (pen.)	Report	Dompé 90'	Stadium: Ibrox Stadium; Attendance: 46,542; Referee: Kevin Clancy

26 July 2023 Friendly	Rangers	1–3	Olympiacos	Glasgow
19:45 BST (UTC+1)	Tavernier 51' (pen.)	Report	Fortounis 44'; Carvalho 56', 70'	Stadium: Ibrox Stadium; Attendance: 29,007; Referee: Steven McLean

29 July 2023 Friendly	TSG Hoffenheim	2–2	Rangers	Sinsheim, Germany
15:30 CEST (UTC+2)	Kadeřábek 23'; Bebou 42'	Report	Tavernier 57' (pen.); Lammers 63'	Stadium: Rhein-Neckar-Arena; Attendance: 11,500

13 January 2024 Friendly	Hertha BSC	1–0	Rangers	Cartagena, Spain
16:00 CET (UTC+1)	Kempf 45'	Report		Stadium: La Manga Club Football Stadium

16 January 2024 Friendly	Rangers	2–2	Copenhagen	Glasgow
20:00 GMT (UTC+0)	Matondo 13'; Dessers 75'	Report	Diks 72'; Yfeko 79' (o.g.)	Stadium: Ibrox Stadium; Attendance: 23,779; Referee: Matthew MacDermid

== Competitions ==
Win Draw Loss Postponed

=== Overall ===
Competition	First match	Last match	Starting round	Final position	Record							
Competition	First match	Last match	Starting round	Final position	Pld	W	D	L	GF	GA	GD	Win %
Scottish Premiership	5 August 2023	18 May 2024	Matchday 1	2nd	38	27	4	7	87	32	+55	71.05
Scottish Cup	20 January 2024	25 May 2024	Fourth round	Runners-up	5	4	0	1	10	2	+8	80.00
Scottish League Cup	19 August 2023	17 December 2023	Second round	Winner	4	4	0	0	10	2	+8	100.00
UEFA Champions League	9 August 2023	30 August 2023	Third qualifying round	Play-off round	4	1	2	1	6	9	−3	25.00
UEFA Europa League	21 September 2023	14 March 2024	Group stage	Round of 16	8	3	3	2	10	9	+1	37.50
Total					59	39	9	11	123	54	+69	66.10

Last updated: 25 May 2024
Source: Competitions

=== Scottish Premiership ===
==== League table ====
Pos	Team	Pld	W	D	L	GF	GA	GD	Pts	Qualification or relegation (Note: Teams play each other three times (33 matches), before the league is split into two groups (the top six and the bottom six).)
1	Celtic (C)	38	29	6	3	95	30	+65	93	Qualification for the Champions League league stage
2	Rangers	38	27	4	7	87	32	+55	85	Qualification for the Champions League third qualifying round
3	Heart of Midlothian	38	20	8	10	54	42	+12	68	Qualification for the Europa League play-off round (Note: As the winners of the 2023–24 Scottish Cup, Celtic, qualified for the Champions League, the berth reserved for the cup winners (Europa League play-off round) passed to the third-placed team. The berths for the Europa League second qualifying round and the Conference League second qualifying round were passed down to the fourth- and fifth-placed teams.)
4	Kilmarnock	38	14	14	10	46	44	+2	56	Qualification for the Europa League second qualifying round
5	St Mirren	38	13	8	17	46	52	−6	47	Qualification for the Conference League second qualifying round

Rules for classification: 1) Points; 2) Goal difference; 3) Goals scored; 4) Head-to-Head points; 5) Head-to-Head goal difference; 6) Play-off (only if deciding champion, UEFA competitions qualification, second stage group allocation or relegation).
(C) Champions

==== Results by round ====
Round	1	2	3	4	5	6	7	8	9	10	11	12	13	14	15	16	17	18	19	20	21	22	23	24	25	26	27	28	29	30	31	32	33	34	35	36	37	38
Ground	A	H	A	H	A	H	H	A	H	H	A	A	A	H	A	H	H	A	A	H	A	A	H	H	H	A	H	A	H	H	H	A	A	A	H	A	H	A
Result	L	W	W	L	W	W	L	W	W	W	W	W	D	W	W	W	W	W	L	W	W	W	W	W	W	W	W	W	L	W	D	L	D	W	W	L	W	D
Position	10	6	4	4	4	3	3	2	2	2	2	2	2	2	2	2	2	2	2	2	2	2	2	2	2	1	1	1	1	2	2	2	2	2	2	2	2	2

Updated to match(es) played on 25 May 2024. Source:
A = Away; H = Home; W = Win; D = Draw; L = Loss

==== Matches ====
5 August 2023 1	Kilmarnock	1–0	Rangers	Kilmarnock
17:15	Lyons 65'	Report		Stadium: Rugby Park; Attendance: 9,256; Referee: Willie Collum

12 August 2023 2	Rangers	4–0	Livingston	Glasgow
15:00	Lammers 10'; Danilo 78'; Sima 84'; Matondo (yellow card) 88'; Dowell 90'	Report	Devlin (yellow card) 82'	Stadium: Ibrox Stadium; Attendance: 49,320; Referee: Don Robertson

26 August 2023 3	Ross County	0–2	Rangers	Dingwall
12:30	Baldwin (yellow card) 11'; Loturi (yellow card) 46'; Turner (yellow card) 89'	Report	Roofe 22'; Tavernier 26'; Lundstram (yellow card) 90+1'	Stadium: Victoria Park; Attendance: 6,540; Referee: David Munro

3 September 2023 4	Rangers	0–1	Celtic	Glasgow
12:00	Cantwell (yellow card) 73'	Report	Furuhashi 45+2'; Scales (yellow card) 78'	Stadium: Ibrox Stadium; Attendance: 50,652; Referee: Don Robertson

16 September 2023 5	St Johnstone	0–2	Rangers	Perth
12:30	Costelloe (yellow card) 30'; Smith (yellow card) 47'; Kane (yellow card) 60'; Olufunwa (yellow card) 76'; Robinson (yellow card) 85'	Report	Danilo 16'; Raskin (yellow card) 34'; Matondo 79'; Tavernier (yellow card) 78'	Stadium: McDiarmid Park; Attendance: 6,967; Referee: Nick Walsh

24 September 2023 6	Rangers	1–0	Motherwell	Glasgow
15:00	Dessers 24'; Davies (yellow card) 90'; Rice (yellow card) 90+1'	Report	Casey (yellow card) 32'; Miller (yellow card) 58'	Stadium: Ibrox Stadium; Attendance: 48,539; Referee: Alan Muir

30 September 2023 7	Rangers	1–3	Aberdeen	Glasgow
15:00	Tavernier (yellow card) 50'; Wright (yellow card) 55' (yellow-red card) 71'; Sima 75'; Goldson (yellow card) 84'	Report	Gartenmann 38'; McGrath 68'; Jensen (yellow card) 72'; MacKenzie 85'	Stadium: Ibrox Stadium; Attendance: 49,959; Referee: Steven McLean

8 October 2023 8	St Mirren	0–3	Rangers	Paisley
12:00	Strain (red card) 28'; McMenamin (yellow card) 48'	Report	Goldson (yellow card) 12'; Tavernier 30' (pen.), 90'; Lovelace (yellow card) 38'; Sima 71'	Stadium: St Mirren Park; Attendance: 6,984; Referee: Nick Walsh

21 October 2023 9	Rangers	4–0	Hibernian	Glasgow
15:00	Sima 17', 65'; Raskin 45'; Lammers (yellow card) 50'; Dessers 79'	Report	Miller (yellow card) 63'; Newell (yellow card) 76'	Stadium: Ibrox Stadium; Attendance: 49,535; Referee: Don Robertson

29 October 2023 10	Rangers	2–1	Heart of Midlothian	Glasgow
15:00	Lundstram (yellow card) 31'; Tavernier (penalty missed) 45+4', 90' (pen.); Danilo 90+3'	Report	Shankland 5'; Offiah (yellow card) 15'; Cochrane (yellow card) 73'; Haring (yellow card) 89'; Forrest (yellow card) 90+7'; Vargas (yellow card) 90+9'	Stadium: Ibrox Stadium; Attendance: 49,530; Referee: John Beaton

1 November 2023 11	Dundee	0–5	Rangers	Dundee
19:45	Sylla (yellow card) 19'; Shaughnessy (yellow card) 24'; Rudden (yellow card) 75'; Cameron (yellow card) 90'	Report	Jack 5'; Balogun (yellow card) 21'; Danilo 51'; Lammers 74'; Dessers 83'; Tavernier 90+1' (pen.)	Stadium: Dens Park; Attendance: 8,970; Referee: Kevin Clancy

12 November 2023 12	Livingston	0–2	Rangers	Livingston
12:00	Montaño (yellow card) 82'	Report	Tavernier (penalty missed) 23', 75' (pen.); Dessers 26'; Cantwell (yellow card) 84'	Stadium: Almondvale Stadium; Attendance: 8,089; Referee: Steven McLean

26 November 2023 13	Aberdeen	1–1	Rangers	Aberdeen
12:00	Miovski 11'; Jensen (yellow card) 47'; McGrath (yellow card) 56'; Duk (yellow card) 87'; Gartenmann (yellow card) 90+3'	Report	Tavernier 90+4' (pen.); Goldson (yellow card) 90+7'	Stadium: Pittodrie Stadium; Attendance: 16,911; Referee: Nick Walsh

3 December 2023 14	Rangers	2–0	St Mirren	Glasgow
15:00	Sima 45', 70'; Goldson (yellow card) 72'	Report	Fraser (yellow card) 26'; McMenamin (yellow card) 54'; Tanser (yellow card) 86'	Stadium: Ibrox Stadium; Attendance: 47,835; Referee: Matthew MacDermid

6 December 2023 15	Heart of Midlothian	0–1	Rangers	Edinburgh
20:00	Vargas (yellow card) 51'; Cochrane (yellow card) 62'; Forrest (yellow card) 90+1'	Report	Sima 34'; Goldson (yellow card) 69'	Stadium: Tynecastle Park; Attendance: 17,759; Referee: Willie Collum

9 December 2023 16	Rangers	3–1	Dundee	Glasgow
15:00	Dessers 20'; Tavernier 26' (pen.); Sima 34'; Cifuentes (red card) 45+6'; Barišić (yellow card) 59'	Report	Bakayoko 5'; McGhee (yellow card) 76'; Lamie (yellow card) 90'; McCowan (yellow card) 90+5'	Stadium: Ibrox Stadium; Attendance: 47,229; Referee: Kevin Clancy

20 December 2023 17	Rangers	2–0	St Johnstone	Glasgow
19:45	Dessers 28'; Goldson (yellow card) 45+2'; Tavernier 85' (pen.); Cantwell (yellow card) 90+3'	Report	Jaiyesimi (red card) 33'; Phillips (yellow card) 38'; Smith (yellow card) 45+1'	Stadium: Ibrox Stadium; Attendance: 46,931; Referee: Alan Muir

24 December 2023 18	Motherwell	0–2	Rangers	Motherwell
12:00	Spencer (yellow card) 53'; O'Donnell (yellow card) 61'; Blaney (yellow card) 65'	Report	Dowell 3'; Cantwell 16'; Sterling (yellow card) 88'	Stadium: Fir Park; Attendance: 8,805; Referee: David Dickinson

30 December 2023 19	Celtic	2–1	Rangers	Glasgow
12:30	Johnston (yellow card) 17'; Bernardo 25', (yellow card) 26'; O'Riley (yellow card) 40'; Furuhashi 47'; Turnbull (yellow card) 80'; McGregor (yellow card) 85'; Nawrocki (yellow card) 87'; Oh (yellow card) 90+9'	Report	Sterling (yellow card) 59'; Balogun (red card) 71'; Tavernier 88'; Souttar (yellow card) 90+9'; Goldson (yellow card) 90+9'	Stadium: Celtic Park; Attendance: 59,664; Referee: Nick Walsh

2 January 2024 20	Rangers	3–1	Kilmarnock	Glasgow
15:00	McCausland 41'; Sima 45'; Cantwell (yellow card) 15', (goal) 61'	Report	McKenzie (yellow card) 30'; Watson (yellow card) 41'; Armstrong 58' (pen.); Wright (yellow card) 63'	Stadium: Ibrox Stadium; Attendance: 49,250; Referee: John Beaton

24 January 2024 21	Hibernian	0–3	Rangers	Edinburgh
19:45	Youan (yellow card) 10'	Report	Yılmaz 30'; Cantwell 45+2'; Dessers 74'	Stadium: Easter Road; Attendance: 18,607; Referee: Steven McLean

27 January 2024 22	St Mirren	0–1	Rangers	Paisley
12:30		Report	Dessers 14'; Lawrence (yellow card) 49'; Lundstram (yellow card) 74'	Stadium: St Mirren Park; Attendance: 6,665; Referee: David Dickinson

3 February 2024 23	Rangers	3–0	Livingston	Glasgow
15:00	Silva 40'; Matondo 45+2'; Cantwell 56'	Report		Stadium: Ibrox Stadium; Attendance: 49,688; Referee: John Beaton

6 February 2024 24	Rangers	2–1	Aberdeen	Glasgow
20:00	Matondo 7'; Cantwell 72'; Sterling (red card) 88'	Report	Miovski 45'; Duk (yellow card) 82'; Polvara (yellow card) 90+2'	Stadium: Ibrox Stadium; Attendance: 49,329; Referee: Don Robertson

14 February 2024 25	Rangers	3–1	Ross County	Glasgow
19:45	Dessers 5', 45+5'; Souttar 90+2'; Cantwell (yellow card) 90+7'	Report	Efete (yellow card) 11'; Murray 29'; Reid (yellow card) 65'; Leak (yellow card) 90+7'	Stadium: Ibrox Stadium; Attendance: 48,685; Referee: Alan Muir

18 February 2024 26	St Johnstone	0–3	Rangers	Perth
12:00	Keltjens (yellow card) 35'; Phillips (yellow card) 71'; McGowan (yellow card) 74'	Report	Diomande 37'; Tavernier 79' (pen.), 87' (pen.)	Stadium: McDiarmid Park; Attendance: 6,986; Referee: Matthew MacDermid

24 February 2024 27	Rangers	5–0	Heart of Midlothian	Glasgow
15:00	Diomande 2'; Cortés 37'; Souttar (yellow card) 41'; Dessers 44', 48'; Silva 65'; Raskin (yellow card) 78'	Report	Shankland (yellow card) 45+2'; Tait (yellow card) 88'	Stadium: Ibrox Stadium; Attendance: 50,354; Referee: Nick Walsh

28 February 2024 28	Kilmarnock	1–2	Rangers	Kilmarnock
19:45	Armstrong 11' (pen.); Mayo (yellow card) 54'; Findlay (yellow card) 81'; Watson (yellow card) 88'	Report	Barišić (yellow card) 34'; Goldson (yellow card) 44'; Tavernier 55'; Lawrence 59'	Stadium: Rugby Park; Attendance: 9,576; Referee: David Dickinson

2 March 2024 29	Rangers	1–2	Motherwell	Glasgow
15:00	Tavernier 60' (pen.)	Report	Bair 9', (yellow card) 90+7'; O'Donnell (yellow card) 56'; Casey 75', (yellow card) 90+5'	Stadium: Ibrox Stadium; Attendance: 50,281; Referee: Alan Muir

30 March 2024 30	Rangers	3–1	Hibernian	Glasgow
15:00	Tavernier (penalty missed) 21', 26'; Dessers 45+7'; Barišić (yellow card) 64'; Matondo 85'; Diomande (yellow card) 87'; Sterling (yellow card) 90'	Report	Triantis (yellow card) 20'; Maolida 45+2'; Levitt (yellow card) 89'; Bushiri (yellow card) 90+4'	Stadium: Ibrox Stadium; Attendance: 50,304; Referee: David Dickinson

7 April 2024 31	Rangers	3–3	Celtic	Glasgow
12:00	Tavernier 55' (pen.); Sima 86'; Matondo 90+3'	Report	Maeda 1', (yellow card) 71'; Kühn (yellow card) 20'; O'Riley 34' (pen.), (yellow card) 42'; Johnston (yellow card) 40'; Idah 87'	Stadium: Ibrox Stadium; Attendance: 50,936; Referee: John Beaton

14 April 2024 32	Ross County	3–2	Rangers	Dingwall
12:00	Baldwin (yellow card) 40'; Murray 47'; Harmon 50'; Efete (yellow card) 54'; Sims 69'; Loturi (yellow card) 82'	Report	Baldwin 15' (o.g.); Sima (yellow card) 68'; Tavernier 89' (pen.)	Stadium: Victoria Park; Attendance: 4,341; Referee: Matthew MacDermid

17 April 2024 33	Dundee	0–0	Rangers	Dundee
20:00	Dodgson (yellow card) 90+3'	Report		Stadium: Dens Park; Attendance: 9,010; Referee: Don Robertson

28 April 2024 34	St Mirren	1–2	Rangers	Paisley
12:30	Mandron 37'; Gogić (yellow card) 78'	Report	Bolton 32' (o.g.); Dessers 74'; Butland (yellow card) 85'	Stadium: St Mirren Park; Attendance: 6,800; Referee: Nick Walsh

5 May 2024 35	Rangers	4–1	Kilmarnock	Glasgow
13:00	Tavernier (penalty missed) 24'; Silva 45+8'; Davies 62'; Lawrence 71'; Souttar 90+3'	Report	Ndaba (yellow card) 9'; Tavernier 12' (o.g.); Wright (red card) 22'; Watkins (yellow card) 55'; Polworth (yellow card) 64'	Stadium: Ibrox Stadium; Attendance: 49,553; Referee: David Dickinson

11 May 2024 36	Celtic	2–1	Rangers	Glasgow
12:30	O'Riley 35', (penalty missed) 54'; Lundstram 38' (o.g.); Maeda (yellow card) 39'; Hatate (yellow card) 45+4'; McGregor (yellow card) 71'	Report	Dessers 40'; Lundstram (red card) 45+2'	Stadium: Celtic Park; Attendance: 59,622; Referee: Willie Collum

14 May 2024 37	Rangers	5–2	Dundee	Glasgow
19:30	McCausland 45'; Dessers 52'; Cantwell 65'; Wright 87', 90+3'	Report	McGhee 38'; Portales 40'	Stadium: Ibrox Stadium; Attendance: 45,760; Referee: Matthew MacDermid

18 May 2024 38	Heart of Midlothian	3–3	Rangers	Edinburgh
12:30	Shankland 33'; Rowles (yellow card) 56'; Lembikisa 82'; Tagawa 90+5'	Report	McCausland 52'; Dowell (yellow card) 63'; Cantwell 69'; Silva 79'	Stadium: Tynecastle Park; Attendance: 18,131; Referee: Don Robertson

=== Scottish Cup ===
20 January 2024 Fourth round	Dumbarton	1–4	Rangers	Dumbarton
17:30	Shiels 88'	Report	Lundstram 35'; Dessers 41'; Tavernier 78' (pen.); Wright 89'	Stadium: Dumbarton Football Stadium; Attendance: 2,020; Referee: Alan Muir

10 February 2024 Fifth round	Rangers	2–0	Ayr United	Glasgow
17:30	Barišić 10'; Silva (yellow card) 24', (goal) 76'	Report	Syla (yellow card) 32'; McKenzie (yellow card) 34'; McGinty (yellow card) 68'	Stadium: Ibrox Stadium; Attendance: 43,454; Referee: Willie Collum

10 March 2024 Quarter-final	Hibernian	0–2	Rangers	Edinburgh
17:30	Triantis (yellow card) 7'; Marcondes (yellow card) 24'; Obita (yellow card) 52' (yellow-red card) 68'; Moriah-Welsh (red card) 71'	Report	Tavernier (penalty missed) 23'; Lundstram 23'; Roofe (yellow card) 66'; Silva 83'	Stadium: Easter Road; Attendance: 14,297; Referee: Steven McLean

21 April 2024 Semi-final	Rangers	2–0	Heart of Midlothian	Glasgow
15:00	Dessers 5', 78'; Souttar (yellow card) 59'; Raskin (yellow card) 82'	Report	Devlin (yellow card) 59'; Tait (yellow card) 82'	Stadium: Hampden Park; Attendance: 45,256; Referee: Steven McLean

25 May 2024 Final	Celtic	1–0	Rangers	Glasgow
15:00	McGregor (yellow card) 41'; Hart (yellow card) 61'; Idah (yellow card) 63', (goal) 90'; Forrest (yellow card) 68'; Taylor (yellow card) 73'; Kühn (yellow card) 90+1'; Maeda (yellow card) 90+4'	Report	Sima (yellow card) 54'; Sterling (yellow card) 62'; Cantwell (yellow card) 74'; Yılmaz (yellow card) 84'; Raskin (yellow card) 90+2'	Stadium: Hampden Park; Attendance: 48,556; Referee: Nick Walsh

=== Scottish League Cup ===
19 August 2023 Second round	Rangers	2–1	Greenock Morton	Glasgow
12:30	Dessers 60' (pen.); Matondo (yellow card) 61'; Danilo 68'	Report	Blues (yellow card) 32'; Gillespie 53' (pen.); Broadfoot (yellow card) 59'; King (yellow card) 90+6'	Stadium: Ibrox Stadium; Attendance: 38,943; Referee: David Dickinson

27 September 2023 Quarter-final	Rangers	4–0	Livingston	Glasgow
20:00	Sima 10', (yellow card) 64'; Yılmaz 66'; de Lucas 84' (o.g.); Jack 90+2'	Report	Brandon (yellow card) 32'	Stadium: Ibrox Stadium; Attendance: 35,420; Referee: Willie Collum

5 November 2023 Semi-final	Heart of Midlothian	1–3	Rangers	Glasgow
15:00	Kingsley (yellow card) 45+3'; Rowles (yellow card) 63'; Shankland 81' (pen.); Devlin (yellow card) 88'; Denholm (yellow card) 90+1'	Report	Cantwell (yellow card) 29'; Tavernier 50' (pen.), 64'; Wright 55'	Stadium: Hampden Park; Attendance: 44,734; Referee: Nick Walsh

17 December 2023 Final	Rangers	1–0	Aberdeen	Glasgow
15:00	Lundstram (yellow card) 40'; Tavernier 76'; Wright (yellow card) 90+2'; Balogun (yellow card) 90+7'; Barišić (yellow card) 90+7'	Report	Sokler (yellow card) 40'; McGrath (yellow card) 52'; Clarkson (yellow card) 63'; Shinnie (yellow card) 88'; Rubežić (yellow card) 90+7'; Miovski (yellow card) 90+7'	Stadium: Hampden Park; Attendance: 49,296; Referee: Don Robertson

=== UEFA Champions League ===
==== Third qualifying round ====
9 August 2023 First leg	Rangers (Scotland)	2–1	(Switzerland) Servette	Glasgow
19:45 BST (UTC+1)	Tavernier 6' (pen.); Dessers 15'; Cantwell (yellow card) 50'; Souttar (yellow card) 57'	Report	Bedia 44' (pen.); Douline (yellow card) 13' (yellow-red card) 59'	Stadium: Ibrox Stadium; Attendance: 48,956; Referee: Donatas Rumšas (Lithuania)

15 August 2023 Second leg	Servette (Switzerland)	1–1 (2–3 agg.)	(Scotland) Rangers	Geneva, Switzerland
20:30 CEST (UTC+2)	Ondoua (yellow card) 11'; Kutesa 22'; Guillemenot (yellow card) 70'; Cognat (yellow card) 89'	Report	Tavernier 50'	Stadium: Stade de Genève; Attendance: 26,000; Referee: Maurizio Mariani (Italy)

==== Play-off round ====
22 August 2023 First leg	Rangers (Scotland)	2–2	(Netherlands) PSV Eindhoven	Glasgow
20:00 BST (UTC+1)	Tavernier (yellow card) 36'; Sima 45'; Barišić (yellow card) 48'; Cantwell (yellow card) 57'; Matondo 76'; Souttar (yellow card) 83'	Report	Sangaré 61'; de Jong 80'; Vertessen (yellow card) 87'	Stadium: Ibrox Stadium; Attendance: 47,537; Referee: Clément Turpin (France)

30 August 2023 Second leg	PSV Eindhoven (Netherlands)	5–1 (7–3 agg.)	(Scotland) Rangers	Eindhoven, Netherlands
21:00 CEST (UTC+2)	Saibari 35', 53'; de Jong 66'; Veerman 78'; Goldson 81' (o.g.); Sambo (yellow card) 83'; Tillman (yellow card) 90+4'	Report	Tavernier 64'; Matondo (yellow card) 83'	Stadium: Philips Stadion; Attendance: 34,560; Referee: José María Sánchez (Spain)

=== UEFA Europa League ===
==== Group stage ====
Pos	Team	Pld	W	D	L	GF	GA	GD	Pts	Qualification	RAN	SPP	BET	ALI
1	(Scotland) Rangers	6	3	2	1	8	6	+2	11	Advance to round of 16	—	2–1	1–0	1–1
2	(Czech Republic) Sparta Prague	6	3	1	2	9	7	+2	10	Advance to knockout round play-offs	0–0	—	1–0	3–2
3	(Spain) Real Betis	6	3	0	3	9	7	+2	9	Transfer to Europa Conference League	2–3	2–1	—	4–1
4	(Cyprus) Aris Limassol	6	1	1	4	7	13	−6	4		2–1	1–3	0–1	—

Source: UEFA
Rules for classification: Group stage tiebreakers

21 September 2023 1	Rangers (Scotland)	1–0	(Spain) Real Betis	Glasgow
20:00 BST (UTC+1)	Goldson (yellow card) 65'; Sima 67'	Report	Bartra (yellow card) 54'; Bravo (yellow card) 68'; Pezzella (yellow card) 81'	Stadium: Ibrox Stadium; Attendance: 45,634; Referee: Lawrence Visser (Belgium)

5 October 2023 2	Aris Limassol (Cyprus)	2–1	(Scotland) Rangers	Kolossi, Cyprus
19:45 EEST (UTC+3)	Moucketou-Moussounda 9', (yellow card) 29'; Boakye (yellow card) 52'; Babicka 59'; Gomis (yellow card) 75'	Report	Sima (yellow card) 50', (goal) 70'; Dessers (yellow card) 64'	Stadium: Alphamega Stadium; Attendance: 3,911; Referee: Horațiu Feșnic (Romania)

26 October 2023 3	Sparta Prague (Czech Republic)	0–0	(Scotland) Rangers	Prague, Czechia
19:45 CEST (UTC+2)	Panák (yellow card) 70'	Report	Cantwell (yellow card) 17'; Souttar (yellow card) 26'; Goldson (yellow card) 63'; Sima (yellow card) 82'	Stadium: Stadion Letná; Attendance: 18,250; Referee: Sascha Stegemann (Germany)

9 November 2023 4	Rangers (Scotland)	2–1	(Czech Republic) Sparta Prague	Glasgow
20:00 GMT (UTC+0)	Danilo 11'; Cantwell 20'; Barišić (yellow card) 58'; Tavernier (yellow card) 89'; Lammers (yellow card) 90+3'; Goldson (yellow card) 90+9'	Report	Gomez (yellow card) 37'; Vitík (yellow card) 45+1'; Haraslín 77'; Laçi (yellow card) 79'; Preciado (yellow card) 90+5'	Stadium: Ibrox Stadium; Attendance: 48,838; Referee: Davide Massa (Italy)

30 November 2023 5	Rangers (Scotland)	1–1	(Cyprus) Aris Limassol	Glasgow
20:00 GMT (UTC+0)	Lammers (yellow card) 45+2'; McCausland 49'	Report	Babicka 28'; Struski (yellow card) 45'; Yago (yellow card) 45+3'; Kokorin (yellow card) 50'; Szöke (yellow card) 67'; Bengtsson (yellow card) 85'; Brown (yellow card) 90'	Stadium: Ibrox Stadium; Attendance: 48,890; Referee: Rohit Saggi (Norway)

14 December 2023 6	Real Betis (Spain)	2–3	(Scotland) Rangers	Seville, Spain
21:00 CET (UTC+1)	Miranda 14'; Pérez 37'; Isco (yellow card) 58'; Roca (yellow card) 88'	Report	Sima 10'; Dessers 20'; Lundstram (yellow card) 64'; Roofe 78', (yellow card) 90'; Tavernier (yellow card) 82'	Stadium: Estadio Benito Villamarín; Attendance: 48,380; Referee: Srđan Jovanović (Serbia)

==== Round of 16 ====
7 March 2024 First leg	Benfica (Portugal)	2–2	(Scotland) Rangers	Lisbon, Portugal
20:00 WET (UTC+0)	Di María (yellow card) 34', (goal) 45+2' (pen.); Goldson 67' (o.g.); Bah (yellow card) 72'	Report	Lawrence 7'; Butland (yellow card) 45+2'; Sterling (yellow card) 27', (goal) 45+5'; Yılmaz (yellow card) 67'	Stadium: Estádio da Luz; Attendance: 48,759; Referee: Tobias Stieler (Germany)

14 March 2024 Second leg	Rangers (Scotland)	0–1 (2–3 agg.)	(Portugal) Benfica	Glasgow
17:45 GMT (UTC+0)	Goldson (yellow card) 55'	Report	Silva 66'; Tengstedt (yellow card) 90+5'	Stadium: Ibrox Stadium; Attendance: 49,943; Referee: Ivan Kružliak (Slovakia)

== Club ==
=== First Team Staff ===
Name	Role
Manager	(England) Michael Beale (until October 1, 2023) (Belgium) Philippe Clement
Assistant Manager	(England) Neil Banfield (until October 1, 2023) (Belgium) Stephan Van Der Heyden
First Team Coach	(England) Damian Matthew (until October 1, 2023) (Scotland) Alex Rae
Goalkeeping Coach	(Scotland) Colin Stewart
Head of Preparation	(Scotland) Craig Flannigan
Head of Strength and Conditioning	(Greece) Paraskevas Polychronopoulos
Physiotherapist	(England) Steve Walker
Masseur	(Scotland) David Lavery

== Squad statistics ==
The table below includes all players registered with the SPFL as part of the Rangers squad for the 2023–24 season. They may not have made an appearance.

=== Appearances and goals ===
No.	Pos.	Nat.	Name	Totals		Scottish Premiership		Scottish Cup		League Cup		Champions League		Europa League	
No.	Pos.	Nat.	Name	Apps	Goals	Apps	Goals	Apps	Goals	Apps	Goals	Apps	Goals	Apps	Goals
Goalkeepers
1	GK	(England) ENG	Jack Butland	58	0	38	0	4	0	4	0	4	0	8	0
28	GK	(Scotland) SCO	Robby McCrorie	1	0	0	0	1	0	0	0	0	0	0	0
32	GK	(Scotland) SCO	Kieran Wright	0	0	0	0	0	0	0	0	0	0	0	0
33	GK	(Scotland) SCO	Jon McLaughlin	0	0	0	0	0	0	0	0	0	0	0	0
Defenders
2	DF	(England) ENG	James Tavernier (captain)	58	24	38	17	5	1	3	3	4	3	8	0
3	DF	(Turkey) TUR	Rıdvan Yılmaz	33	2	16+10	1	3+1	0	1	1	0	0	2	0
5	DF	(Scotland) SCO	John Souttar	41	2	24+4	2	4	0	0+1	0	4	0	4	0
6	DF	(England) ENG	Connor Goldson (vc)	48	0	30	0	3	0	4	0	4	0	7	0
21	DF	(England) ENG	Dujon Sterling	36	1	11+13	0	3	0	2+2	0	0+2	0	1+2	1
26	DF	(England) ENG	Ben Davies	17	1	7+1	1	1	0	1+1	0	0	0	6	0
27	DF	(Nigeria) NGR	Leon Balogun	19	0	13+1	0	2	0	2+1	0	0	0	0	0
31	DF	(Croatia) CRO	Borna Barišić	35	1	18+2	0	1+2	1	2+1	0	4	0	5	0
38	DF	(Scotland) SCO	Leon King	6	0	2+3	0	0+1	0	0	0	0	0	0	0
46	DF	(England) ENG	Johnly Yfeko	1	0	0	0	0	0	1	0	0	0	0	0
47	DF	(Scotland) SCO	Robbie Fraser	2	0	1+1	0	0	0	0	0	0	0	0	0
Midfielders
4	MF	(England) ENG	John Lundstram	53	2	33+1	0	3+2	2	4	0	1+1	0	8	0
8	MF	(Scotland) SCO	Ryan Jack	22	2	5+6	1	2	0	2	1	3+1	0	1+2	0
13	MF	(England) ENG	Todd Cantwell	44	8	24+6	7	3+1	0	2	0	4	0	3+1	1
20	MF	(England) ENG	Kieran Dowell	16	2	5+7	2	0	0	1	0	0+3	0	0	0
42	MF	(Ivory Coast) CIV	Mohamed Diomande	19	2	11+2	2	4	0	0	0	0	0	2	0
43	MF	(Belgium) BEL	Nicolas Raskin	31	1	13+5	1	3+2	0	0	0	4	0	2+2	0
51	MF	(Scotland) SCO	Alex Lowry	0	0	0	0	0	0	0	0	0	0	0	0
61	MF	(England) ENG	Paul Nsio	0	0	0	0	0	0	0	0	0	0	0	0
64	MF	(Scotland) SCO	Bailey Rice	2	0	0+2	0	0	0	0	0	0	0	0	0
93	MF	(Scotland) SCO	Cole McKinnon	3	0	0+1	0	0+1	0	0	0	0	0	0+1	0
Forwards
7	FW	(Portugal) POR	Fábio Silva	25	6	12+6	4	3+2	2	0	0	0	0	2	0
9	FW	(Nigeria) NGR	Cyriel Dessers	54	22	29+6	16	4	3	2+2	1	3+1	1	5+2	1
11	FW	(Wales) WAL	Tom Lawrence	32	3	12+11	2	1+2	0	0+1	0	0	0	3+2	1
16	FW	(Colombia) COL	Óscar Cortés	7	1	3+3	1	1	0	0	0	0	0	0	0
17	FW	(Wales) WAL	Rabbi Matondo	31	6	8+11	5	2+3	0	1	0	1+1	1	1+3	0
19	FW	(Senegal) SEN	Abdallah Sima	40	16	17+8	11	1+1	0	3+1	1	2+1	1	6	3
23	FW	(Scotland) SCO	Scott Wright	33	4	7+16	2	1+2	1	0+3	1	0+1	0	2+1	0
25	FW	(Jamaica) JAM	Kemar Roofe	24	2	6+9	1	0+1	0	2+1	0	0	0	1+4	1
45	FW	(Northern Ireland) NIR	Ross McCausland	39	4	15+14	3	1+3	0	1	0	0	0	1+4	1
57	FW	(England) ENG	Archie Stevens	0	0	0	0	0	0	0	0	0	0	0	0
65	FW	(England) ENG	Zak Lovelace	2	0	1+1	0	0	0	0	0	0	0	0	0
99	FW	(Brazil) BRA	Danilo	21	6	5+7	4	0	0	1+1	1	2+2	0	2+1	1
Players transferred or loaned out during the season who made an appearance
7	MF	(Romania) ROU	Ianis Hagi	2	0	0	0	0	0	0+1	0	0+1	0	0	0
14	FW	(Netherlands) NED	Sam Lammers	31	2	10+7	2	0	0	3+1	0	2+2	0	5+1	0
15	MF	(Ecuador) ECU	José Cifuentes	20	0	7+2	0	0	0	2	0	3+1	0	3+2	0
44	DF	(Scotland) SCO	Adam Devine	1	0	0	0	0	0	0+1	0	0	0	0	0

- Last updated: 25 May 2024

Appearances (starts and substitute appearances) and goals include those in Scottish Premiership, Scottish Cup, Scottish League Cup, UEFA Champions League and UEFA Europa League.

=== Discipline ===
==== Yellow cards ====
As of match played on 25 May 2024

Colour	Player	Cards
Yellow card
Yellow card	Connor Goldson	11
Yellow card	Todd Cantwell	10
Yellow card	Borna Barišić	6
Yellow card	John Souttar	6
Yellow card	John Lundstram	5
Yellow card	Abdallah Sima	5
Yellow card	Dujon Sterling	5
Yellow card	James Tavernier	5
Yellow card	Nicolas Raskin	4
Yellow card	Leon Balogun	3
Yellow card	Sam Lammers	3
Yellow card	Rabbi Matondo	3
Yellow card	Scott Wright	3
Yellow card	Rıdvan Yılmaz	3
Yellow card	Jack Butland	2
Yellow card	Kemar Roofe	2
Yellow card	Ben Davies	1
Yellow card	Cyriel Dessers	1
Yellow card	Mohamed Diomande	1
Yellow card	Kieran Dowell	1
Yellow card	Tom Lawrence	1
Yellow card	Zak Lovelace	1
Yellow card	Bailey Rice	1
Yellow card	Fábio Silva	1

==== Red cards ====
As of match played on 25 May 2024

Colour	Player	Cards
Red card
Red card	Leon Balogun	1
Red card	José Cifuentes	1
Red card	John Lundstram	1
Red card	Dujon Sterling	1
Red card	Scott Wright	1

=== Clean sheets ===
As of match played on 25 May 2024

No.	Player	Scottish Premiership	Scottish Cup	League Cup	Champions League	Europa League	Total	Appearances
1	Jack Butland	18	3	2	0	2	25	58
28	Robby McCrorie	0	0	0	0	0	0	1
32	Kieran Wright	0	0	0	0	0	0	0
33	Jon McLaughlin	0	0	0	0	0	0	0
Total		18	3	2	0	2	25	59
