= Leon King =

Scottish footballer

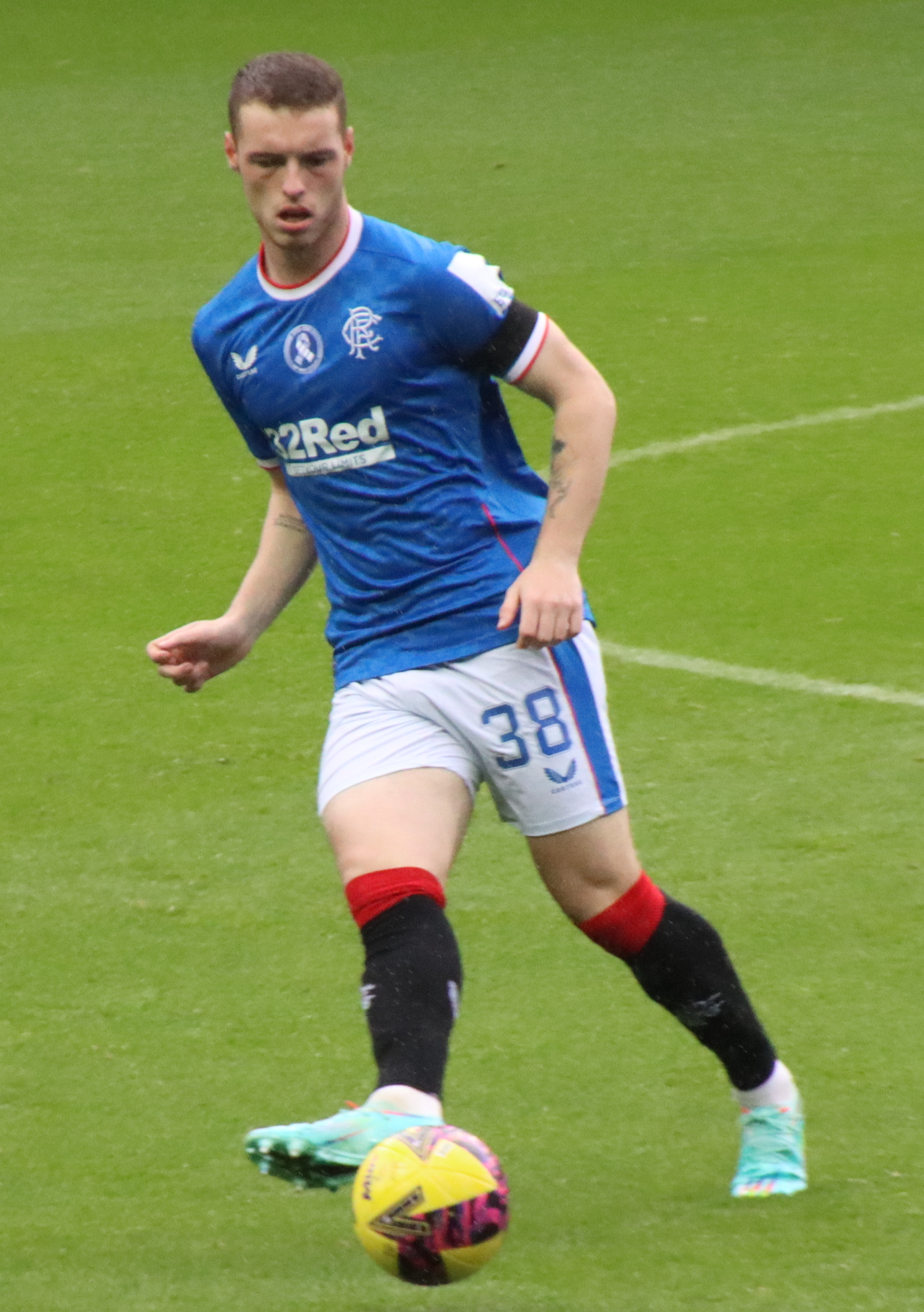
- Leon King in action for Rangers 2022

Personal information
- Full name: Leon Thomson King
- Date of birth: 14 January 2004 (age 22)
- Place of birth: Barrhead, Scotland
- Height: 1.88 m (6 ft 2 in)
- Position: Defender

Team information
- Current team: Ayr United

Youth career
- Rangers

Senior career*
Years	Team	Apps	(Gls)
2020–2026	Rangers	27	(0)
2025	→ Queen's Park (loan)	9	(0)
2025-2026	→ Ayr United (loan)	27	(2)
2026-	Ayr United	0	(0)

International career^{‡}
2018	Scotland U16	2	(0)
2019	Scotland U17	4	(0)
2022–2024	Scotland U21	12	(0)
- * Club domestic league appearances and goals as of 21:37, 28 December 2025 (UTC) ‡ National team caps and goals as of 25 May 2025

Leon Thomson King (born 14 January 2004) is a Scottish professional footballer who plays as a defender for Ayr United.

== Club career ==
=== Rangers ===
King joined Rangers in his early years, soon appearing to be one of the club's brightest prospects. He made his Rangers Under-20s debut aged only 14 under the management of Graeme Murty in November 2018. At the end of the 2018–19 season, he was also part of the squad that won the Scottish Youth Cup against Celtic.

King made his Rangers debut on 29 November 2020 in a League Cup match against Falkirk. He made his Scottish Premiership debut for on 12 May 2021, replacing Joe Aribo in the 86th minute of a 3–0 away win against Livingston.

On 5 January 2022, King signed a contract extension until the summer of 2024 and was subsequently promoted to the first-team squad on a full time basis.

On 7 September 2022, King made his debut for Rangers in the UEFA Champions League group stage, coming on as a half time substitute vs Ajax. He made his full starting debut in the competition on 4 October 2022 against Liverpool at Anfield. Due to injuries to other defenders, King would feature in all Rangers Champions League fixtures that campaign.

On 7 September 2025, King joined Scottish Championship side Ayr United on loan until the end of the season. Whilst with the club he won multiple of their end of season awards including Men's Player of the Year.

=== Ayr United ===
On 16 July 2026, it was confirmed that King had signed a two year deal to join Ayr United permanently.

== International career ==
King was selected for the Scotland under-21 squad in May 2022.

== Career statistics ==
As of match played 19 January 2025

Appearances and goals by club, season and competition
Club	Season	League			National cup		League cup		Other		Total	
Club	Season	Division	Apps	Goals	Apps	Goals	Apps	Goals	Apps	Goals	Apps	Goals
Rangers	2020–21	Scottish Premiership	1	0	0	0	1	0	0	0	2	0
Rangers	2021–22	Scottish Premiership	4	0	2	0	0	0	0	0	6	0
Rangers	2022–23	Scottish Premiership	15	0	0	0	2	0	6 (Note: Appearances in UEFA Champions League)	0	23	0
Rangers	2023–24	Scottish Premiership	5	0	1	0	0	0	0	0	6	0
Rangers	2024–25	Scottish Premiership	2	0	1	0	0	0	0	0	3	0
Rangers	Total		27	0	4	0	3	0	6	0	41	0
Rangers B	2021–22	—			—		—		2 (Note: Appearances in Scottish Challenge Cup)	0	2	0
Rangers B	2022–23	—			—		—		1 (Note: Appearance in Scottish Challenge Cup)	0	1	0
Career total			27	0	4	0	3	0	9	0	43	0

== Honours ==
Rangers

- Scottish Premiership: 2020–21
- Scottish Cup: 2021–22
- Scottish League Cup: 2023–24
- UEFA Europa League runner-up: 2021–22

Individual

- AU Player Fund Young Player of the Year: 2025-26
- Ayr United Men's Young Player of the Year: 2025-26
- Ayr United Men's Player of the Year: 2025-26
- Ayr United Men's Player's Player of the Year: 2025-26
