= Zak Lovelace =

English footballer (born 2006)

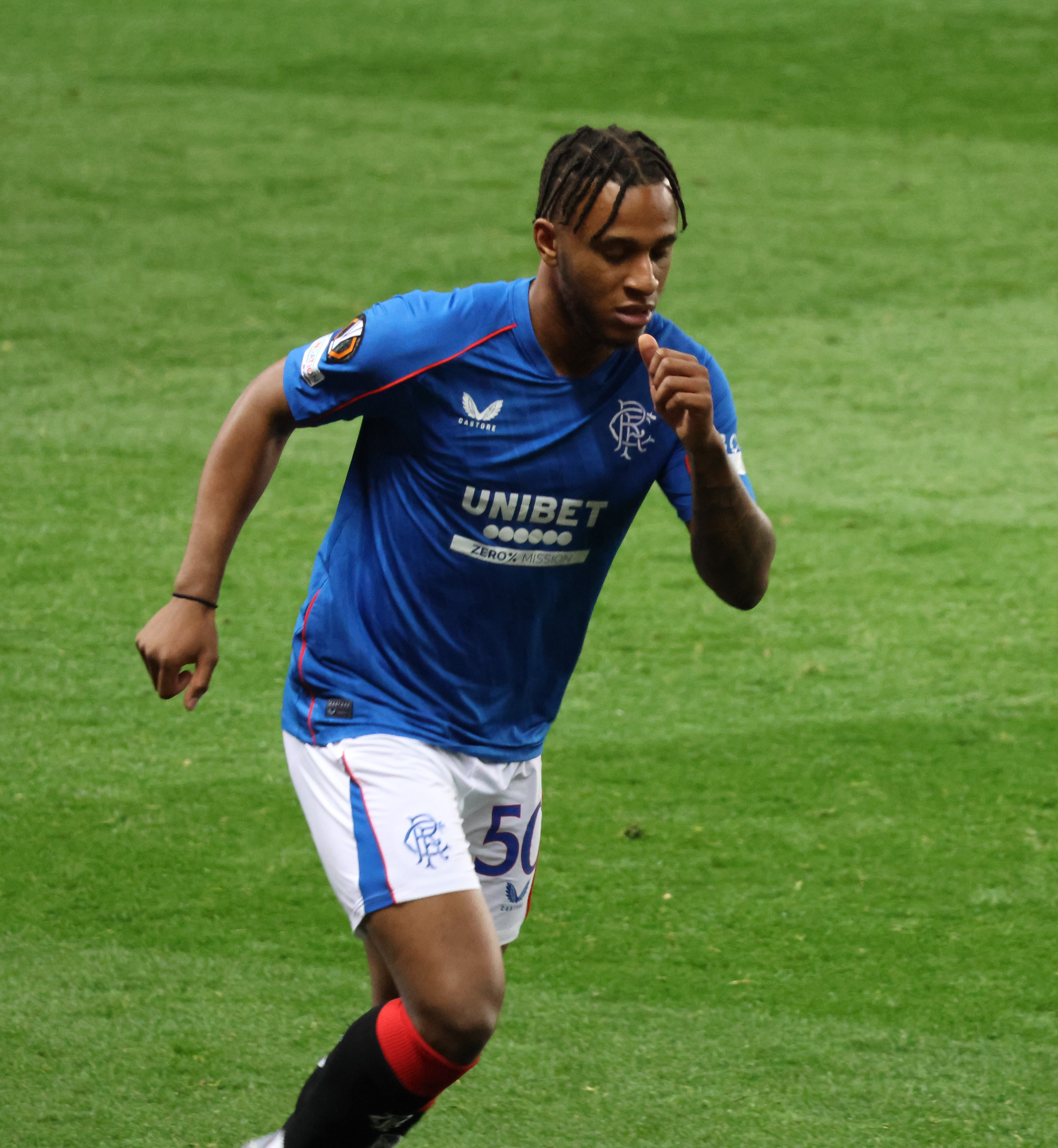

Personal information
- Full name: Zakariya Shakeel Lovelace
- Date of birth: 23 January 2006 (age 20)
- Place of birth: Wandsworth, England
- Height: 6 ft 0 in (1.82 m)
- Positions: Forward; winger

Team information
- Current team: Millwall
- Number: 29

Youth career
- –2019: Glebe
- 2019–2021: Millwall

Senior career*
Years	Team	Apps	(Gls)
2021–2022	Millwall	5	(0)
2022–2025	Rangers	4	(0)
2025–	Millwall	8	(0)

International career^{‡}
2023	England U17	7	(1)
- * Club domestic league appearances and goals as of 14:30, 4 February 2025 (UTC) ‡ National team caps and goals as of 14:50, 30 May 2023 (UTC)

Zakariya Shakeel Lovelace (born 23 January 2006) is an English professional footballer who plays as a forward for EFL Championship club Millwall.

== Club career ==
In 2019, Lovelace joined Millwall from Glebe after scoring 43 goals in 15 appearances en route to Glebe's Kent Youth League victory. On 29 December 2021, after scoring 21 goals in 19 appearances throughout Millwall's youth teams, Lovelace made his debut as a late substitute in Millwall's 1–0 win over Coventry City, becoming Millwall's second youngest ever player in the process.

On 4 July 2022, Lovelace signed for Scottish club Rangers, initially linking up with the club's Academy. He was sent off for simulation in the 2023 Scottish Youth Cup Final against Celtic, which Rangers lost 6–5.

Lovelace made his first team debut for Rangers in the League Cup against Scottish League One team Queen of the South on 30 August 2022. He made his first Scottish Premiership appearance for the club against Old Firm rivals Celtic on 13 May 2023. He made his first start for Rangers against St Mirren on 8 October 2023. On 24 October 2024 Lovelace made his first European appearance coming on as a substitute in a UEFA Europa League 4–0 victory over FCSB.

On 3 February 2025, Lovelace left Rangers to rejoin Millwall on a permanent transfer for an undisclosed fee. His second Millwall debut was delayed after he had to undergo an operation on a knee injury later that month.

== International career ==
Born in England, Lovelace is of Jamaican descent. On 22 March 2023, Lovelace made his England U17 debut during a 3–1 win over Denmark in Katwijk as part of 2023 UEFA European Under-17 Championship qualification.

On 17 May 2023, Lovelace was named in the England squad for the 2023 UEFA European Under-17 Championship. He scored his only goal of the tournament against Switzerland as England finished fifth.

== Career statistics ==
As of match played 19 January 2025

Appearances and goals by club, season and competition
Club	Season	League			National Cup		League Cup		Europe		Other		Total	
Club	Season	Division	Apps	Goals	Apps	Goals	Apps	Goals	Apps	Goals	Apps	Goals	Apps	Goals
Millwall	2021–22	EFL Championship	4	0	0	0	0	0	—		—		4	0
Millwall	Total		4	0	0	0	0	0	—		—		4	0
Rangers B	2022–23	—			—		—		—		3 (Note: Appearance(s) in Scottish Challenge Cup)	1	3	1
Rangers B	2023–24	—			—		—		—		3	1	3	1
Rangers B	2024–25	—			—		—		—		2	0	2	0
Total			—		—		—		—		8	2	8	2
Rangers	2022–23	Scottish Premiership	1	0	0	0	1	0	0	0	—		2	0
Rangers	2023–24	Scottish Premiership	2	0	0	0	0	0	0	0	—		2	0
Rangers	2024–25	Scottish Premiership	0	0	1	0	0	0	1 (Note: Appearances in UEFA Europa League)	0	—		2	0
Total			3	0	1	0	1	0	1	0	—		6	0
Career total			7	0	1	0	1	0	1	0	8	2	18	2
