= John Lundstram =

English footballer (born 1994)

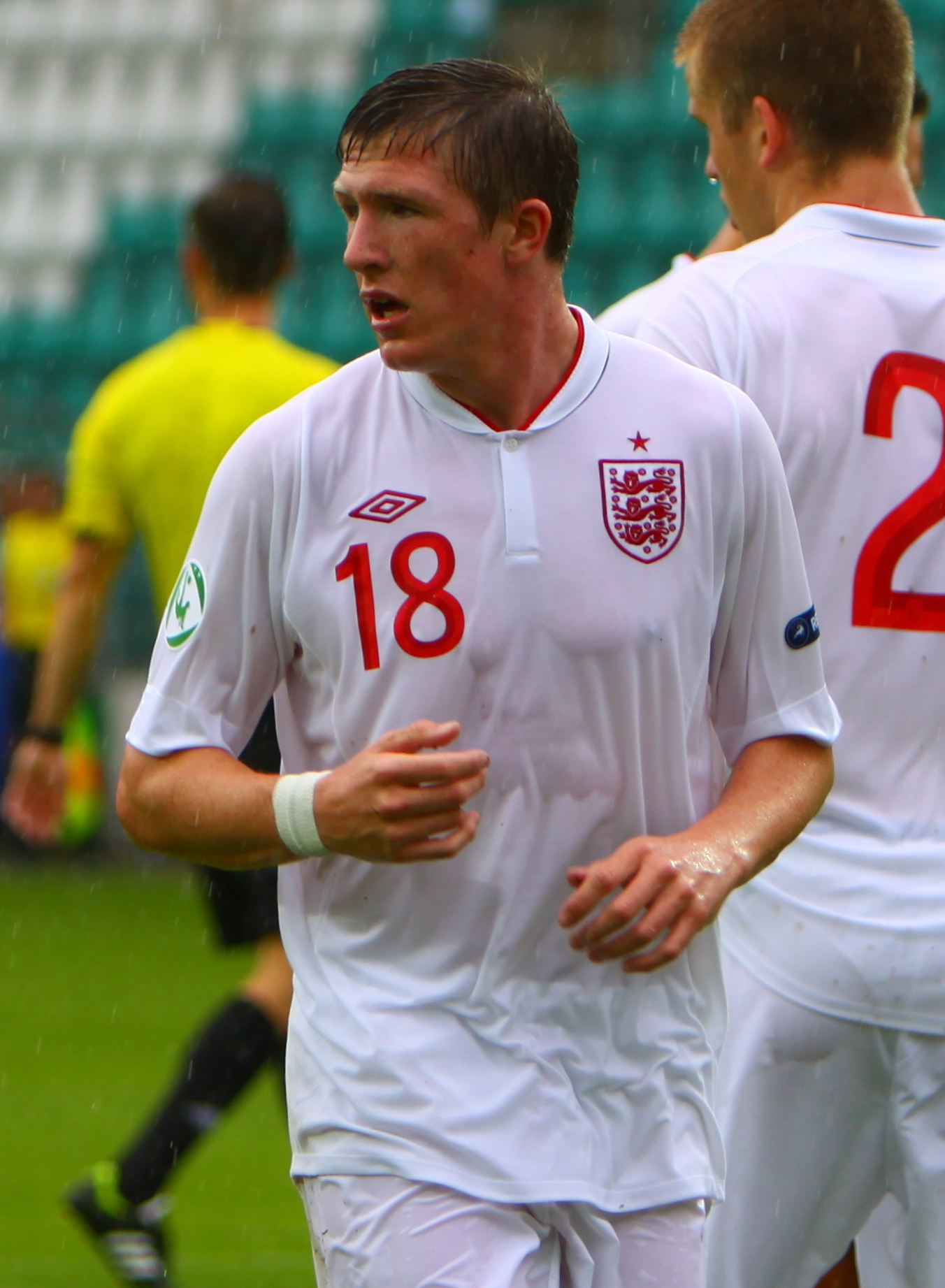
- Lundstram playing for England U19 in 2012

Personal information
- Full name: John David Lundstram
- Date of birth: 18 February 1994 (age 32)
- Place of birth: Liverpool, England
- Height: 5 ft 11 in (1.81 m)
- Position: Midfielder

Team information
- Current team: Leicester City
- Number: 6

Youth career
- 2002–2012: Everton

Senior career*
| Years | Team | Apps | (Gls) |
| 2012–2015 | Everton | 0 | (0) |
| 2013 | → Doncaster Rovers (loan) | 14 | (0) |
| 2013–2014 | → Yeovil Town (loan) | 14 | (2) |
| 2014 | → Leyton Orient (loan) | 7 | (0) |
| 2014–2015 | → Blackpool (loan) | 17 | (0) |
| 2015 | → Leyton Orient (loan) | 4 | (0) |
| 2015 | → Scunthorpe United (loan) | 7 | (0) |
| 2015–2017 | Oxford United | 82 | (4) |
| 2017–2021 | Sheffield United | 108 | (8) |
| 2021–2024 | Rangers | 98 | (6) |
| 2024–2026 | Trabzonspor | 32 | (3) |
| 2025–2026 | → Hull City (loan) | 29 | (1) |
| 2026– | Leicester City | 7 | (3) |

International career
| 2010–2011 | England U17 | 17 | (0) |
| 2011–2012 | England U18 | 2 | (0) |
| 2012–2013 | England U19 | 10 | (2) |
| 2013 | England U20 | 2 | (0) |
- * Club domestic league appearances and goals as of 22:43, 10 November 2026 (UTC)

John David Lundstram (born 18 February 1994) is an English professional footballer who plays as a defensive midfielder for EFL League One club Leicester City.

Lundstram started his career in Everton's academy. He signed his first professional contract in June 2011 but never made a first-team appearance for Everton. He had loan spells at Doncaster Rovers, Yeovil Town, Leyton Orient, Blackpool and Scunthorpe United before leaving Everton to join Oxford United in 2015.

After racking up 104 appearances for Oxford, he joined Sheffield United in 2017. He helped the Blades win promotion and played for them in the Premier League for two seasons. He then signed for Rangers in July 2021. Lundstram has scored goals in each of England's top four divisions.

He has represented England internationally at under-17, under-18, under-19, and under-20 levels and has appeared in four official youth competitions for the Three Lions.

== Club career ==
=== Everton ===
Lundstram began his career with Everton and signed a full-time scholarship in July 2010. In June 2011, Lundstram signed a two-year professional contract with Everton, followed by another two-year contract in June 2013. On 22 July 2014, he made his first appearance for Everton's first team in a friendly against Tranmere Rovers.

At the end of the 2014–15 season, Lundstram was released by the club. Lundstram later revealed that Everton offered him a six-month contract, but he rejected it in search of first-team football, saying that "it definitely makes a difference being permanent. You just feel much more part of things."

==== Loan spells ====
In February 2013, he joined Doncaster Rovers on a one-month loan. He made his full league début for the club in a 1–1 draw against Yeovil Town on 23 February 2013. There was concern over Lundstram's future at Doncaster Rovers after he sustained an ankle injury during a match against Portsmouth, which ended a 1–1 draw, but in the end Lundstram's loan spell was extended until the end of the season. Lundstram went on to make over a dozen appearances for Rovers, becoming a key part of the side that lifted the League One trophy at the end of the season.

On 28 November 2013, Lundstram joined Football League Championship side Yeovil Town on loan until January. He made his debut against Watford two days later, Yeovil winning 3–0. During the match, Lundstram assisted Joe Edwards for the third goal. On 3 December, he scored on his second appearance for the club in a 1–0 win against Blackpool. Lundstram then extended his loan until the end of the season. He scored his second goal for the club in a 3–2 loss against Derby County on 28 January 2014. On 10 March 2014, Lundstram was recalled by Everton having become a peripheral figure at Yeovil, having made 16 appearances and scoring twice.

On 27 March 2014, Lundstram joined Football League One side Leyton Orient on a one-month loan deal. Two days later, he made his debut in a 1–0 loss against Bradford City. After five appearances, Lundstram extended his loan stay until after the Football League play-offs on 24 April 2014. He played in two of the club's three play-off matches and came on as a substitute for Dave Mooney in the 108th minute of the play-off final against Rotherham United. Lundstram was one of the three Leyton Orient players to convert their kick in a penalty shoot-out, which they lost 4–3. After the Os failed to achieve promotion, Lundstram returned to his parent club.

On 6 August 2014, Lundstram joined Blackpool on a season-long loan, making his debut on 9 August. Lundstram made seventeen straight appearances for Blackpool until he was recalled by his parent club on 3 January 2015.

On 9 January 2015, Lundstram rejoined Leyton Orient on loan until 19 February 2015, stating on his return: "I feel like I have unfinished business at Orient after the way last season ended." His second debut for the club came the following day, when he came on as a second-half substitute for Josh Wright in a 1–0 defeat by Fleetwood Town. After four appearances, it was announced on 19 February 2015 that Lundstram would return to his parent club.

Just 30 days after returning to his parent, Lundstram joined Scunthorpe United on a one-month loan deal. Upon moving to Scunthorpe, Lundstram expressed happiness at the way the club treated him. His debut came in a 4–0 loss against Sheffield United. After extending his loan spell at the club, he went on to make seven appearances before returning to Everton at the end of the season.

=== Oxford United ===
On 13 August 2015, after attracting interest from Crewe Alexandra and Wigan Athletic of League One, Lundstram signed for League Two side Oxford United on a two-year deal, with the option of a further year. Upon joining the club, Lundstram stated he was motivated with a move, stating that he "need a full season out there of playing 30-odd games".

Shortly after signing for the club, Lundstram missed the first two league games of the season because of an ankle ligament injury sustained at Everton. He eventually recovered and made his Oxford United debut, coming on as a late substitute, in a 3–1 win over Notts County on 18 August 2015. He quickly became a first-team regular in the midfield position, partnering with Liam Sercombe. It wasn't until 17 October 2015 that he scored his first goal for the club, in a 2–2 draw against Leyton Orient. He also went on to score two more goals later in the season against Exeter City and Morecambe. His performance throughout December earned him a nomination for Player of the Month for Sky Bet League 2, but he lost out to Gareth Evans. However, he was sent off for a "reckless challenge" on Michael Tonge in the 16th minute of a 1–1 draw against Stevenage on 25 March 2016. The club unsuccessfully appealed against his three-match suspension, which included the Football League Trophy final. Nevertheless, he helped the side get promoted to League One after finishing second place in the league. Although he suffered an injury during his first season, Lundstram went on to finish with 47 appearances and scored three times in all competitions.

In his second season at Oxford United, his appointment as team captain, at the age of 22, was announced on 12 July 2016 following the departure of long-serving defender Jake Wright. Lundstram played his first match as captain in the opening game of the season, in a 1–1 draw against Chesterfield. Throughout the season, Lundstram captained the side 53 times, an experience he described as "enjoyable rather than burden". On 18 March 2017, Lundstram scored his first goal of the season, in a 2–1 win over Scunthorpe United. After beating Luton Town in the semi-finals of the EFL Trophy on 1 March 2017, Lundstram played in the final, where he stated he learned his lesson following a suspension that cost him a place in the previous final. However, like Oxford United's previous final, they lost in a 2–1 defeat to Coventry City. Despite this, he helped the side finish 8th in the 2016–17 season and went on to make 57 appearances, scoring once in all competitions. At the end of the 2016–17 season, he received the award for Community Contribution at the club's award ceremony. Although he had his contract triggered after making 35 appearances in the 2016–17 season, the club began negotiations with Lundstram over a long-term contract.

=== Sheffield United ===
Lundstram joined newly promoted Championship side Sheffield United in July 2017 on a three-year deal for a fee that, according to the Oxford Mail, is believed to be in the region of £700,000. He scored his first goal for Sheffield United in a 2–1 loss at Nottingham Forest on 30 September 2017. On 28 April 2019 he gained promotion with United to the Premier League.

On 18 August 2019, he scored his first ever goal in the top flight of English football when he netted the only goal in a 1–0 victory over Crystal Palace. It ensured that he scored in each of the top four divisions of English football.

=== Rangers ===
On 5 July 2021, Lundstram signed a three-year contract with Scottish club Rangers. On 31 July 2021, Lundstram made his competitive debut for Rangers coming off the bench in Rangers' 3–0 win against Livingston. He made his first start three days later in a UEFA Champions League qualifier against Swedish side Malmö. Lundstram scored his first goal for Rangers in a 5–0 home win to Dunfermline Athletic on 13 August 2021. He endured a slow start to his Rangers career and attracted criticism when he was sent off in the 43rd minute, after receiving a second yellow card during the clubs first leg UEFA Europa League play-off against Armenian team Alashkert.

On 5 May 2022, he scored the winning goal in a 3–1 win over RB Leipzig in the second leg of the semi-finals of the Europa League, which helped Rangers to reach the final.

On 1 June 2024, it was announced that Lundstram had been released by Rangers, ending his 3 years at the club.

=== Trabzonspor ===
On 25 June 2024, Turkish side Trabzonspor announced that Lundstram would join the club on a free transfer, signing a three-year deal.

==== Loan to Hull City ====
On 31 July 2025, Lundstram signed for Championship club Hull City on a season-long loan. He made his debut on 9 August, the opening day of the season, in a 0–0 away draw to Coventry City. He scored his first goal for the club on 20 September in a 3–1 home win against Southampton.

=== Leicester City ===
On 1 September 2026, Lundstram joined Leicester City on a two-year deal.

== International career ==
Described as a strong tackling midfielder, Lundstram worked his way into the England U17 squad during the 2010–11 campaign after impressing in the Nordic Tournament.

His first full season on the international stage saw him play a major part in the U17s' run to the semi-final of the European Championship in Serbia. UEFA described Lundstram as an "influential catalyst in launching attacking moves" and he was also named in the "Tournament select squad". Following the completion of the tournament, UEFA made comparisons to fellow Liverpool-born player Steven Gerrard and praised his "biting tackle" and a "fine range of passing to instigate attacks".

Lundstram was named in the England squad that reached the quarter-final of the 2011 FIFA U-17 World Cup under John Peacock. He played in a total of four games. England were eliminated from the competition by Germany having knocked Argentina out in the round of 16.

The 2011–12 season saw him play twice for Noel Blake's U18s, captaining the side to a win against Poland before he made another step-up to the U19s squad, again under Blake, as he helped England to qualify for the European Championship Finals in Estonia. The following month, Lundstram was called up to England U19 by Noel Blake once again. He scored the opening goal in a 2–1 victory over France in the final tournament. England reached the semi-final of the tournament and were eliminated from the competition by Greece. After the tournament, Lundstram captained the England U19 side for the first time, in a 3–0 win over Estonia U19. Lundstram scored again on 13 November 2012, in a 1–0 win over Finland U19.

On 28 May 2013, he was named in manager Peter Taylor's 20-man squad for the 2013 FIFA U-20 World Cup. He made his debut on 16 June, in a 3–0 win in a warm-up game against Uruguay. This turned out to be his only appearance for the side, being an unused substitute for two more matches as England U20 were eliminated from the tournament.

== Personal life ==
Lundstram inherited his surname from his Norwegian great-grandfather.

Despite progressing in the Everton youth set-up, Lundstram supported Liverpool as a boy.

== Career statistics ==
As of match played 10 November 2026

Appearances and goals by club, season and competition
| Club | Season | League | | | National cup (Note: Includes FA Cup, Scottish Cup, Turkish Cup) | | League cup (Note: Includes EFL Cup, Scottish League Cup) | | Europe | | Other | | Total | |
| Club | Season | Division | Apps | Goals | Apps | Goals | Apps | Goals | Apps | Goals | Apps | Goals | Apps | Goals |
|---|---|---|---|---|---|---|---|---|---|---|---|---|---|---|
| Everton | 2012–13 | Premier League | 0 | 0 | 0 | 0 | 0 | 0 | — | | — | | 0 | 0 |
| Everton | 2013–14 | Premier League | 0 | 0 | 0 | 0 | 0 | 0 | — | | — | | 0 | 0 |
| Everton | 2014–15 | Premier League | 0 | 0 | 0 | 0 | 0 | 0 | 0 | 0 | — | | 0 | 0 |
| Everton | Total | | 0 | 0 | 0 | 0 | 0 | 0 | 0 | 0 | — | | 0 | 0 |
| Doncaster Rovers (loan) | 2012–13 | League One | 14 | 0 | 0 | 0 | 0 | 0 | — | | — | | 14 | 0 |
| Yeovil Town (loan) | 2013–14 | Championship | 14 | 2 | 2 | 0 | 0 | 0 | — | | — | | 16 | 2 |
| Leyton Orient (loan) | 2013–14 | League One | 7 | 0 | 0 | 0 | 0 | 0 | — | | 2 (Note: Appearances in League One play-offs) | 0 | 9 | 0 |
| Blackpool (loan) | 2014–15 | Championship | 17 | 0 | 0 | 0 | 1 | 0 | — | | — | | 18 | 0 |
| Leyton Orient (loan) | 2014–15 | League One | 4 | 0 | 0 | 0 | 0 | 0 | — | | 0 | 0 | 4 | 0 |
| Scunthorpe United (loan) | 2014–15 | League One | 7 | 0 | 0 | 0 | 0 | 0 | — | | 0 | 0 | 7 | 0 |
| Oxford United | 2015–16 | League Two | 37 | 3 | 5 | 0 | 1 | 0 | — | | 4 (Note: Appearances in EFL Trophy) | 0 | 47 | 3 |
| Oxford United | 2016–17 | League One | 45 | 1 | 3 | 0 | 2 | 0 | — | | 7 | 0 | 57 | 1 |
| Oxford United | Total | | 82 | 4 | 8 | 0 | 3 | 0 | — | | 11 | 0 | 104 | 4 |
| Sheffield United | 2017–18 | Championship | 36 | 3 | 2 | 0 | 2 | 0 | — | | — | | 40 | 3 |
| Sheffield United | 2018–19 | Championship | 10 | 0 | 1 | 0 | 1 | 0 | — | | — | | 12 | 0 |
| Sheffield United | 2019–20 | Premier League | 34 | 5 | 2 | 0 | 0 | 0 | — | | — | | 36 | 5 |
| Sheffield United | 2020–21 | Premier League | 28 | 0 | 4 | 0 | 0 | 0 | — | | — | | 32 | 0 |
| Sheffield United | Total | | 108 | 8 | 9 | 0 | 3 | 0 | — | | — | | 120 | 8 |
| Rangers | 2021–22 | Scottish Premiership | 27 | 1 | 3 | 0 | 2 | 1 | 16 (Note: One appearance in UEFA Champions League, fourteen appearances and two goals in UEFA Europa League) | 2 | — | | 48 | 4 |
| Rangers | 2022–23 | Scottish Premiership | 37 | 5 | 3 | 0 | 3 | 0 | 9 (Note: Appearances in UEFA Champions League) | 0 | — | | 52 | 5 |
| Rangers | 2023–24 | Scottish Premiership | 34 | 0 | 4 | 2 | 4 | 0 | 10 (Note: Two appearances in UEFA Champions League, eight appearances in UEFA Europa League) | 0 | — | | 52 | 2 |
| Rangers | Total | | 98 | 6 | 10 | 2 | 9 | 1 | 35 | 2 | — | | 152 | 11 |
| Trabzonspor | 2024–25 | Süper Lig | 32 | 3 | 6 | 1 | — | | 6 (Note: Four appearances in UEFA Europa League, two appearances in UEFA Conference League) | 0 | — | | 44 | 4 |
| Hull City (loan) | 2025–26 | Championship | 29 | 1 | 1 | 0 | 1 | 0 | — | | 3 (Note: Appearances in EFL Championship play-offs) | 0 | 34 | 1 |
| Leicester City | 2026–27 | League One | 7 | 3 | 1 | 0 | — | | — | | 1 | 1 | 9 | 4 |
| Career total | | | 419 | 27 | 37 | 3 | 16 | 1 | 42 | 2 | 17 | 1 | 531 | 34 |

== Honours ==
Doncaster Rovers

- Football League One: 2012–13

Oxford United

- Football League Two second-place promotion: 2015–16
- EFL Trophy runner-up: 2015–16, 2016–17

Sheffield United

- EFL Championship second-place promotion: 2018–19

Rangers

- Scottish Cup: 2021–22
- Scottish League Cup: 2023–24; runner-up: 2022–23
- UEFA Europa League runner-up: 2021–22

Hull City

- EFL Championship play-offs: 2026

Individual

- UEFA European Under-17 Championship Team of the Tournament: 2011
- PFA Scotland Team of the Year: 2023–24 Premiership
