= Archie Stevens =

English footballer (born 2006)

Personal information
- Full name: Archie James Stevens
- Date of birth: 11 January 2006 (age 20)
- Place of birth: England
- Position: Winger

Team information
- Current team: Sutton United FC on loan from arsenal
- Number: 29

Youth career
- AFC Wimbledon
- 2022–2025: Rangers

Senior career*
Years	Team	Apps	(Gls)
2022–2025	Rangers	0	(0)
2025	→ Dunfermline Athletic (loan)	10	(0)
2025–	Arsenal	0	(0)

International career^{‡}
2022–2023	England U17	7	(1)
2023	England U18	3	(0)
- * Club domestic league appearances and goals as of 11:38, 2 May 2025 (UTC) ‡ National team caps and goals as of 09:37, 2 April 2024 (UTC)

Archie James Stevens (born 11 January 2006) is an English footballer who plays as a winger for Premier League club Arsenal.

== Club career ==
In 2022, Stevens signed for Scottish side Rangers. On 30 August 2022 he made his club debut at the age of sixteen as a substitute in the Scottish League Cup against Queen of the South. He was described as "handed his debut in the cup win over Queen of the South... followed by a frustrating spell on the sidelines as Stevens saw his progress at Auchenhowie stall during his first season". He scored for the club during the 2023 Scottish Youth Cup final.

On 31 January 2025, Stevens joined Scottish Championship side Dunfermline Athletic on loan until the end of the season. In May 2025, Stevens was released by Rangers after failing to agree a contract extension.

On 15 September 2025, Arsenal announced the signing of Stevens for the under-21s after a successful trial.

== International career ==
Stevens was included in the England under-17 squad for the 2023 FIFA U-17 World Cup and made his only appearance of the tournament as a substitute in a group stage defeat against Brazil. He was described as "showing great promise".

== Style of play ==
Stevens mainly operates as a winger. He has been described as "a very attack-minded player, [whose] stronger position is on the right" and "also more than capable of playing as a 10".

== Personal life ==
Stevens is the son of Sarah Stevens.

== Career statistics ==
As of end of 2024-25 season

Appearances and goals by club, season and competition
Club	Season	League			Scottish Cup		League Cup		Europe		Other		Total	
Club	Season	Division	Apps	Goals	Apps	Goals	Apps	Goals	Apps	Goals	Apps	Goals	Apps	Goals
Rangers	2022–23	Scottish Premiership	0	0	0	0	1	0	0	0	—		1	0
Rangers B	2023–24	Scottish Premiership	0	0	0	0	0	0	0	0	2 (Note: Appearances in Scottish League Challenge Cup)	0	2	0
Rangers B	2024–25	Scottish Premiership	0	0	0	0	0	0	0	0	4	1	4	1
Rangers B	Total		0	0	0	0	1	0	0	0	6	1	7	1
Dunfermline Athletic (loan)	2024–25	Scottish Championship	10	0	1	0	0	0	—		0	0	11	0
Career total			10	0	1	0	1	0	0	0	6	1	18	1
