= Nick Walsh (referee) =

Scottish football referee

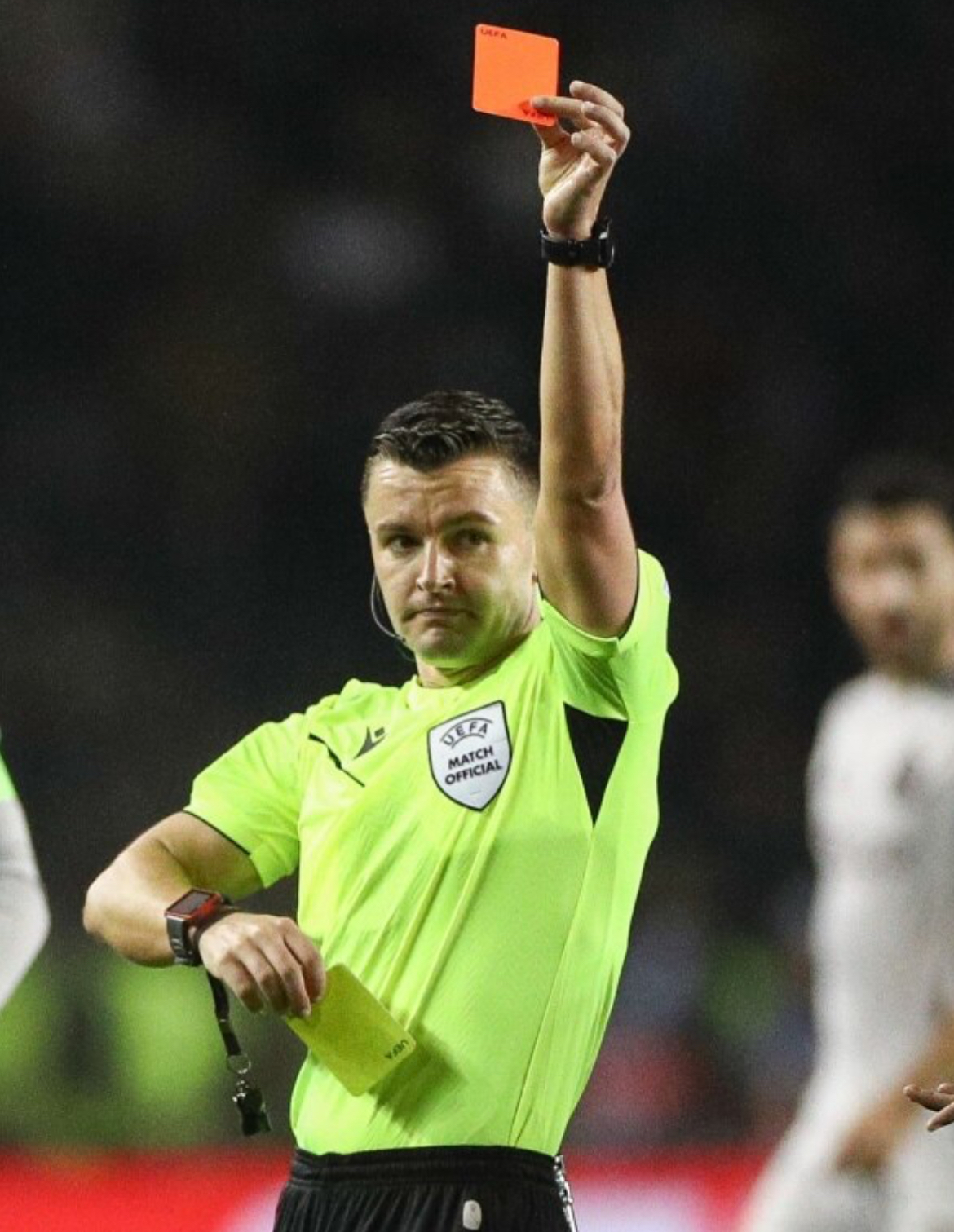
- Full name: Nicholas Walsh
- Born: 30 November 1990 (age 35)

Domestic
Years	League	Role
2013–	Scottish Professional Football League	Referee
2013–	Scottish Football Association	Referee

International
Years	League	Role
2018–	FIFA listed	Referee

Nicholas Walsh is a Scottish football referee, currently a referee in the SPFL and a FIFA referee.

== Refereeing career ==
Walsh's first Scottish Professional Football League game as a referee came at the beginning of the Scottish League Two campaign, when he oversaw Clyde against Queen's Park.

On 22 October 2022, Walsh refereed the second Scottish Premiership match with the video assistant referee (VAR), which saw Celtic beat Hearts 4–3.

Walsh was selected as the referee for the 2024 Scottish Cup final between Celtic and Rangers. During the match, Walsh disallowed a goal scored by Rangers for an apparent infringement on the Celtic goalkeeper. The decision was criticised by Rangers manager Philippe Clement, stating "its a really big call to disallow the goal when Celtic players are grabbing and pulling my players".

Walsh was selected as the referee for the Europa League match between Ajax and Qarabağ in October 2024. Walsh was heavily criticised after the match for sending off two Qarabag players. Ajax went on to win the match by 3 goals to nil. Qarabag manager Gurban Gurbanov stated "I found some of the referee’s choices very questionable".

Following a review into refereeing decisions made in November 2024, it was found that Walsh was incorrect in his decision not to send off Celtic player Reo Hatate during a match against Kilmarnock for a dangerous challenge.

Walsh was criticised by Kilmarnock manager Derek McInnes after a Scottish Cup match between Celtic and Kilmarnock in January 2025. Celtic were awarded a freekick which they subsequently scored from with McInnes stating after the match, "It's actually a free kick to us, Not even that, to not even give the free kick, the right decision, to us, they [Celtic] take it 20 yards from where the offence was, and they're way out the other side before we get a chance to settle".

Walsh refereed the Europa League match between Union SG and Braga in January 2025. During the match, Walsh sent off 4 players and showed a total of 12 yellow cards.

In January 2025 during a Scottish Premiership match between Rangers and Dundee United, Walsh was heavily criticised for sending off Rangers player Mohamed Diomande. The VAR referee asked Walsh to review his decision at the pitch side monitor but Walsh decided not to change his mind. Following the match several commentators criticised the decision, with Ally McCoist describing it as "one of the worst decisions he's ever seen". Premiership commentators Alan Hutton and Michael Stewart described it as '"laughable"' and '"embarrassing'". Rangers appealed the decision and it was ultimately upheld by the review panel with the red card for violent conduct revoked.
