= Jack Harkness (footballer, born 2004) =

Scottish footballer (born 2004)

Personal information
- Date of birth: 19 January 2004 (age 22)
- Place of birth: Bathgate, Scotland
- Position: Right-back

Youth career
- 2020–2023: Rangers

Senior career*
Years	Team	Apps	(Gls)
2023–	Rangers	0	(0)
2023-2024	→ Greenock Morton (loan)	0	(0)
2024–2025	→ Stirling Albion (loan)	25	(2)

International career^{‡}
2020	Scotland U16	1	(0)
2022	Scotland U19	3	(0)
- * Club domestic league appearances and goals as of 1 June 2025 ‡ National team caps and goals as of 07:48, 18 February 2024 (UTC)

Jack Harkness (born 19 January 2004) is a Scottish professional footballer who plays as a defender for Scottish Premiership club Rangers. Jack had a loan spell during 2023-2024 season with Greenock Morton where he suffered an injury.

== Club career ==
Harkness started his career in the youth ranks of Rangers and features regularly for Rangers B.

He signed to 77 Sports Management in February 2021.

In November 2021, he signed a contract extension with the Gers, keeping him at the club until the summer of 2023. Harkness signed a new three-year deal with the Gers in December 2022.

On 29 September 2023, Harkness signed for Greenock Morton on a season-long loan deal.

On 1 August 2024, he joined League Two side Stirling Albion on a season long loan.

== International career ==
Harkness made his international debut for Scotland U16 on 22 January 2020 in a 3–2 defeat to Australia.
