= 2024 Scottish League Cup final =

Football games

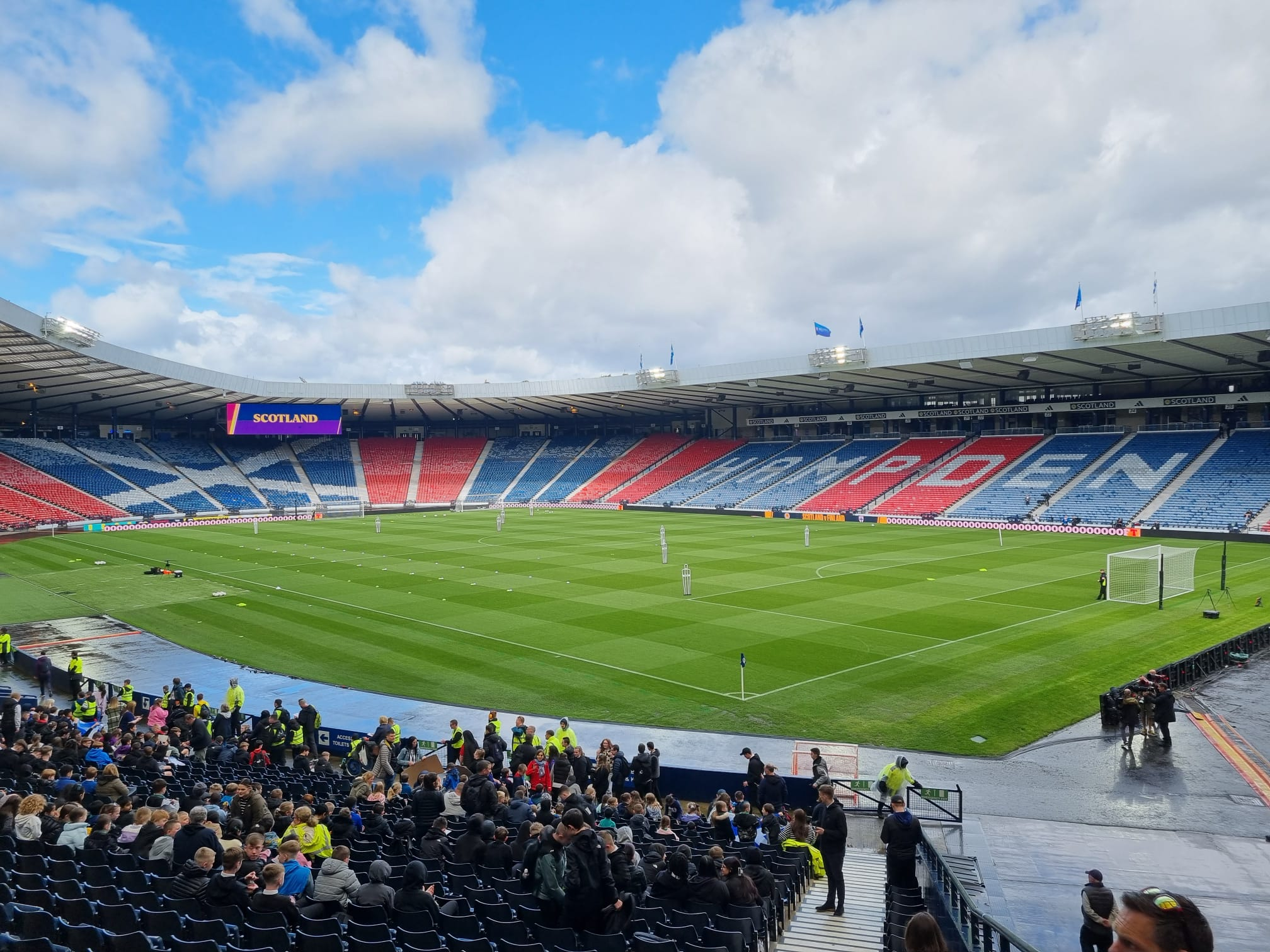
- Hampden Park, venue for the final
- Event: 2024–25 Scottish League Cup
Celtic	Rangers
3	3
- After extra time Celtic won 5–4 on penalties
- Date: 15 December 2024
- Venue: Hampden Park, Glasgow
- Referee: John Beaton
- Attendance: 49,420

The 2024 Scottish League Cup final was an association football match that took place at Hampden Park, Glasgow on 15 December 2024. It was the culmination of the 2024–25 Scottish League Cup, the 79th season of the Scottish League Cup (known as the Premier Sports Cup for sponsorship reasons), a competition for the 42 teams in the Scottish Professional Football League (SPFL). It was played between Old Firm rivals Celtic (21-time winners, including in seven of the previous ten editions) and Rangers (title holders and record 28-time winners). It was the 17th Scottish League Cup final between the sides and the 443rd meeting overall in major competitions.

After the match finished in a 3–3 draw at the end of normal time and the same scoreline after extra time, Celtic won 5–4 in a penalty shootout to claim the trophy.

== Route to the final ==
As both clubs participated in European competitions, they both received a bye through the group stage.

=== Celtic ===
Round	Opposition	Score
Second round	Hibernian	3–1 (h)
Quarter-final	Falkirk	5–2 (h)
Semi-final	Aberdeen	6–0 (n)

=== Rangers ===
Round	Opposition	Score
Second round	St Johnstone	2–0 (h) (Note: As Ibrox Stadium was unavailable due to ongoing construction work, Rangers hired Hampden Park on a temporary basis.)
Quarter-final	Dundee	3–0 (h)
Semi-final	Motherwell	2–1 (n)

== Match ==
=== Build-up ===
This was the second final between the clubs in the calendar year, after the 2024 Scottish Cup final in May which brought the previous domestic season to a close.

Celtic went into the final as favourites owing to their position of dominance in Scottish football over the preceding dozen years since the events of 2012 involving Rangers, and in recent seasons (they had won seven of the nine trophies on offer since 2021–22, with Rangers winning the other two). Celtic had also made a stronger start to the 2024–25 Scottish Premiership, including a 3–0 win over Rangers, and held an 11-point lead over their old rivals in the league table; Rangers also trailed Aberdeen, whom Celtic had defeated 6–0 in their League Cup semi-final meeting. Both clubs had performed credibly in Europe, each recording draws in the days leading up to the final: Celtic returned from a goalless Champions League fixture away to Dinamo Zagreb, and Rangers shared the points at home to Tottenham Hotspur in the Europa League, with defender John Souttar substituted due to an injury which caused him to miss the Hampden showpiece.

In the hours prior to the match there were incidents of disorder in Glasgow city centre, as the clubs' 'ultras' groups confronted one another, smashed shop windows and threw missiles at police.

Within the stadium, pyrotechnics were ignited at both ends on a large scale, a common occurrence in Scottish football in the 2020s, despite warnings from governing bodies over their misuse and both Celtic and Rangers (as well as Motherwell) facing fines for the same actions at Hampden in the competition's semi-finals. Kick-off was delayed slightly to allow smoke from the devices to clear.

=== Summary ===
Rangers took the lead in the first half when Nedim Bajrami anticipated and intercepted a pass across midfield from Greg Taylor and fed Hamza Igamane, whose shot was saved by Kasper Schmeichel only for Bajrami to score from the rebound.

Taylor redeemed his mistake early in the second half with the shot which brought the equaliser, although a deflection off Nicolas Raskin took the ball past Rangers goalkeeper Jack Butland. Three minutes later Celtic took the lead when Daizen Maeda beat defender Leon Balogun to a pass, raced forward and finished into the corner. The Rangers equaliser came from Mohamed Diomande who showed strength to turn inside the penalty area and score past Schmeichel.

In the 87th minute, Celtic had what appeared to be a decisive goal when Nicolas Kühn dribbled upfield and had space to collect a return pass from Arne Engels after Diomande slipped while chasing back, placing the ball past Butland. However, Rangers hit back almost immediately, Václav Černý's cross met by a header from substitute Danilo to take the match to extra time.

Few chances were created in the additional 30 minutes, although Rangers had a claim for a penalty when Liam Scales could be seen holding Černý's shirt just inside the area.

The outcome was therefore settled in a penalty shootout, in which Rıdvan Yılmaz of Rangers had his kick saved by Schmeichel. All other efforts (including one from Butland) were scored, with the winning penalty converted by Maeda.

=== Aftermath ===
Hundreds of celebrating Celtic supporters made their way onto the pitchside track in the minutes after the shootout, which delayed the trophy presentation and was reported could result in sanctions for the club.

Celtic won the 119th major trophy in their history, moving them ahead of Rangers at the top of the all-time Scottish rankings. Their winger James Forrest claimed a 25th winner's medal with the club, equalling the record held by Bobby Lennox. For Rangers the outcome was very similar to their defeat in the 2022 UEFA Europa League final, with captain James Tavernier commenting that it evoked 'flashbacks' of that disappointment.

Rangers submitted an official request for clarification from the Scottish Football Association into the extra time penalty incident. The Video Assistant Referee team had not intervened, with a reason initially provided that referee John Beaton had already blown his whistle to award a free kick for a trip by Scales on Černý outside the box, half a second before the jersey pull. However, analysts including current and former officials assessed that the foul was continuous and ended inside the area. Four days after the match, the SFA's head of referee operations Willie Collum stated that it was a "really, really poor" and "unacceptable" decision not to review the incident and award Rangers a penalty.

=== Details ===
15 December 2024
15:30 GMT

Celtic	3–3 (a.e.t.)	Rangers
Taylor 56'; Maeda 60'; Kühn 87'		Bajrami 41'; Diomande 75'; Danilo 88'
Penalties
Idah (penalty scored); McGregor (penalty scored); Engels (penalty scored); Hatate (penalty scored); Maeda (penalty scored)	5–4	(penalty scored) Tavernier; (penalty scored) Hagi; (penalty scored) Danilo; (penalty missed) Yılmaz; (penalty scored) Butland

Hampden Park, Glasgow
Attendance: 49,420
Referee: John Beaton

Celtic	Rangers

GK	1	(Denmark) Kasper Schmeichel
RB	2	(Canada) Alistair Johnston		(substituted off) 70'
CB	20	(United States) Cameron Carter-Vickers	(yellow card) 90+2'
CB	6	(United States) Auston Trusty		(substituted off) 46'
LB	3	(Scotland) Greg Taylor		(substituted off) 90'
CM	28	(Portugal) Paulo Bernardo		(substituted off) 71'
CM	42	(Scotland) Callum McGregor (c)
CM	41	(Japan) Reo Hatate
RF	10	(Germany) Nicolas Kühn		(substituted off) 105'
CF	8	(Japan) Kyogo Furuhashi	(yellow card) 67'	(substituted off) 76'
LF	38	(Japan) Daizen Maeda
Substitutes:
GK	12	(Finland) Viljami Sinisalo
DF	5	(Republic of Ireland) Liam Scales	(yellow card) 93'	(substituted on) 46'
DF	56	(Scotland) Anthony Ralston		(substituted on) 70'
DF	11	(Spain) Álex Valle		(substituted on) 90'
MF	27	(Belgium) Arne Engels		(substituted on) 71'
MF	49	(Scotland) James Forrest		(substituted on) 105'
FW	7	(Honduras) Luis Palma
FW	9	(Republic of Ireland) Adam Idah		(substituted on) 76'
FW	13	(South Korea) Yang Hyun-jun
Manager:
(Northern Ireland) Brendan Rodgers

GK	1	(England) Jack Butland
RB	2	(England) James Tavernier (c)	(yellow card) 90+4'
CB	27	(Nigeria) Leon Balogun	(yellow card) 24'	(substituted off) 67'
CB	4	(Netherlands) Robin Pröpper
LB	22	(Brazil) Jefté	(yellow card) 44'	(substituted off) 61'
CM	10	(Ivory Coast) Mohamed Diomande		(substituted off) 105'
CM	14	(Albania) Nedim Bajrami		(substituted off) 86'
CM	43	(Belgium) Nicolas Raskin	(yellow card) 90+1'
RF	18	(Czech Republic) Václav Černý		(substituted off) 105'
CF	29	(Morocco) Hamza Igamane	(yellow card) 95'	(substituted off) 101'
LF	30	(Romania) Ianis Hagi	(yellow card) 111'
Substitutes:
GK	31	(Scotland) Liam Kelly
DF	3	(Turkey) Rıdvan Yılmaz		(substituted on) 61'
DF	21	(England) Dujon Sterling	(yellow card) 107'	(substituted on) 67'
DF	38	(Scotland) Leon King
MF	8	(Scotland) Connor Barron		(substituted on) 105'
MF	20	(England) Kieran Dowell		(substituted on) 105'
FW	9	(Nigeria) Cyriel Dessers	(yellow card) 102'	(substituted on) 101'
FW	45	(Northern Ireland) Ross McCausland
FW	99	(Brazil) Danilo		(substituted on) 86'
Manager:
(Belgium) Philippe Clement

Assistant referees:
David McGeachie
Jonathan Bell
Fourth official:
Steven McLean
Video assistant referee:
Alan Muir
Assistant video assistant referee:
Frank Connor

Match rules

- 90 minutes
- 30 minutes of extra time if necessary
- Penalty shoot-out if scores still level
- Nine named substitutes
- Maximum of five substitutions, with a sixth allowed in extra time

== See also ==
- Scottish League Cup finals played between same clubs: 1957, 1964, 1965, 1966, 1970, 1975, 1978, 1982, 1984 (March), 1986, 1990, 2003, 2009, 2011, 2019, 2023 (February)
