= 2024–25 Rangers F.C. season =

Rangers
2024–25 season
- Chairman: John Bennett (until 14 September 2024); John Gilligan (interim) (from 14 September until 16 December 2024); Fraser Thornton (from 16 December 2024)
- Manager: Philippe Clement (until 23 February 2025); Barry Ferguson (interim) (from 24 February 2025)
- Stadium: Hampden Park (until September); Ibrox Stadium
- Scottish Premiership: 2nd
- Scottish Cup: Fifth round
- League Cup: Runners-up
- Champions League: Third qualifying round
- Europa League: Quarter-finals
- Top goalscorer: League: Cyriel Dessers (18); All: Cyriel Dessers (29)
- Highest home attendance: 51,065 vs Celtic; 2 January 2025
- Lowest home attendance: 23,261 vs St Johnstone; 17 August 2024
- Average home league attendance: 48,255
- Biggest win: 6–0 vs Ross County; 24 August 2024; 6–0 vs Kilmarnock; 4 December 2024
- Biggest defeat: 0–3 vs Celtic; 1 September 2024; 1–4 vs Lyon; 3 October 2024
Home colours	Away colours	Third colours

The 2024–25 season was the 145th season of competitive football by Rangers.

== Season summary ==
The day before the 2024–25 season began, manager Philippe Clement signed a contract extension by a further year to 2028.

Rangers reached the League Cup final, losing on penalties after a 3–3 draw with Celtic on 15 December 2024.

On 23 February 2025, Rangers sacked Clement. The team were 13 points off Celtic, having just lost at home to St Mirren for the first time since 1991, and had been knocked out the Scottish Cup at Ibrox against Scottish Championship side Queen's Park. The following day, former Rangers player Barry Ferguson was appointed as interim head coach. He brought former teammates Neil McCann, Billy Dodds and Allan McGregor onto the coaching team.

Finishing with 18 goals from 35 league appearances, Cyriel Dessers won the Scottish Premiership's golden boot award, edging out Daizen Maeda and Simon Murray who had both finished on 16.

On 30 May, a US-based consortium, including private healthcare tycoon Andrew Cavenagh and the investment arm of the San Francisco 49ers, completed a multi-million pound takeover of the club.

== Players ==
=== Squad information ===
N	Pos.	Nat.	Name	Age	Since	App	Goals	Ends	Transfer fee	Notes
1	GK	(England)	Jack Butland	33	2023	102	0	2027	Free	
2	DF	(England)	James Tavernier (captain)	34	2015	513	130	2026	£0.2m	
3	DF	(Turkey)	Rıdvan Yılmaz	25	2022	77	2	2027	£3.4m	
4	DF	(Netherlands)	Robin Pröpper	33	2024	43	2	2026	£1.5m	
5	DF	(Scotland)	John Souttar	30	2022	94	4	2026	Free	
7	FW	(Colombia)	Óscar Cortés	22	2024	18	1	2025	Loan	
8	MF	(Scotland)	Connor Barron	24	2024	46	0	2028	Free	
9	FW	(Nigeria)	Cyriel Dessers	31	2023	109	51	2027	Undisclosed	
10	MF	(Ivory Coast)	Mohamed Diomande	24	2024	73	8	2028	£4.3m	
11	FW	(Wales)	Tom Lawrence	32	2022	69	12	2025	Free	
14	MF	(Albania)	Nedim Bajrami	27	2024	44	5	2028	£3.4m	
15	MF	(Ecuador)	José Cifuentes	27	2023	20	0	2027	£1.2m	
17	FW	(Wales)	Rabbi Matondo	26	2022	67	8	2026	£2.5m	
18	FW	(Czech Republic)	Václav Černý	28	2024	52	18	2025	Loan	
19	DF	(France)	Clinton Nsiala	22	2024	13	1	2028	Free	
20	MF	(England)	Kieran Dowell	28	2023	32	2	2026	Free	
21	DF	(England)	Dujon Sterling	26	2023	70	1	2028	Free	
22	DF	(Brazil)	Jefté	22	2024	52	1	2028	£0.68m	
24	DF	(Netherlands)	Neraysho Kasanwirjo	24	2024	15	0	2025	Loan	
26	DF	(England)	Ben Davies	31	2022	58	1	2026	£3m	
27	DF	(Nigeria)	Leon Balogun	38	2023 (Note: Players second spell at the club; 1st spell 2020–2022)	114	3	2025	Free	
28	DF	(Portugal)	Rafael Fernandes	24	2025	4	0	2025	Loan	
29	FW	(Morocco)	Hamza Igamane	23	2024	46	16	2029	£1.7m	
30	MF	(Romania)	Ianis Hagi	27	2020	130	20	2025	£3m	
31	GK	(Scotland)	Liam Kelly	30	2024 (Note: Players second spell at the club; 1st spell 2006–2018)	13	0	2026	Free	
32	GK	(Scotland)	Kieran Wright	27	2016	0	0	2025	Youth system	
38	DF	(Scotland)	Leon King	22	2020	42	0	2026	Youth system	
43	MF	(Belgium)	Nicolas Raskin	25	2023	95	6	2027	£1.75m	
44	DF	(Scotland)	Adam Devine	23	2020	11	0	2025	Youth system	
45	FW	(Northern Ireland)	Ross McCausland	23	2021	66	7	2027	Youth system	
47	DF	(Scotland)	Robbie Fraser	23	2021	6	0	2026	Youth system	
48	MF	(Scotland)	Cole McKinnon	23	2021	4	1	2025	Youth system	
49	MF	(Scotland)	Bailey Rice	19	2022	15	0	2026	Undisclosed	
52	MF	(Scotland)	Findlay Curtis	20	2024	5	0	2027	Youth system	
53	FW	(England)	Archie Stevens	20	2022	1	0	2025	Cross-border compensation	
54	GK	(Northern Ireland)	Mason Munn	20	2022	1	0	2028	Youth system	
55	MF	(England)	Paul Nsio	20	2022	3	0	2026	Cross-border compensation	
99	FW	(Brazil)	Danilo	27	2023	48	12	2028	£5.6m	

- Last updated: 17 May 2025

=== Transfers ===
==== In ====
===== First team =====
No.	Pos.	Nat.	Name	Age	Moving from	Type	Transfer window	Ends	Transfer fee	Source
10	MF	(Ivory Coast)	Mohamed Diomande	22	Nordsjælland (Denmark)	Transfer	Summer	2028	£4.3m	
22	DF	(Brazil)	Jefté	20	Fluminense (Brazil)	Transfer	Summer	2028	£0.68m	
7	FW	(Colombia)	Óscar Cortés	20	RC Lens (France)	Loan	Summer	2025	N/A	
19	DF	(France)	Clinton Nsiala	20	AC Milan (Italy)	Transfer	Summer	2028	Free	
8	MF	(Scotland)	Connor Barron	21	Aberdeen	Transfer	Summer	2028	Free	
31	GK	(Scotland)	Liam Kelly	28	Motherwell	Transfer	Summer	2026	Free	
29	FW	(Morocco)	Hamza Igamane	21	AS FAR (Morocco)	Transfer	Summer	2029	£1.7m	
18	FW	(Czech Republic)	Václav Černý	26	Wolfsburg (Germany)	Loan	Summer	2025	N/A	
4	DF	(Netherlands)	Robin Pröpper	30	Twente (Netherlands)	Transfer	Summer	2026	£1.5m	
24	DF	(Netherlands)	Neraysho Kasanwirjo	22	Feyenoord (Netherlands)	Loan	Summer	2025	N/A	
14	MF	(Albania)	Nedim Bajrami	25	Sassuolo (Italy)	Transfer	Summer	2028	£3.4m	
28	DF	(Portugal)	Rafael Fernandes	22	Lille (France)	Loan	Winter	2025	N/A	

==== Out ====
===== First team =====
No.	Pos.	Nat.	Name	Age	Moving to	Type	Transfer window	Transfer fee	Source
4	MF	(England)	John Lundstram	30	Trabzonspor (Turkey)	End of contract	Summer	Free	
8	MF	(Scotland)	Ryan Jack	32	Esenler Erokspor (Turkey)	End of contract	Summer	Free	
25	FW	(Jamaica)	Kemar Roofe	31	Derby County (England)	End of contract	Summer	Free	
31	DF	(Croatia)	Borna Barišić	31	Trabzonspor (Turkey)	End of contract	Summer	Free	
33	GK	(Scotland)	Jon McLaughlin	36	Swansea City (Wales)	End of contract	Summer	Free	
32	GK	(Scotland)	Kieran Wright	25	Airdrieonians	Loan	Summer	N/A	
28	GK	(Scotland)	Robby McCrorie	26	Kilmarnock	Transfer	Summer	Undisclosed	
14	FW	(Netherlands)	Sam Lammers	27	Twente (Netherlands)	Transfer	Summer	£2.5m	
6	DF	(England)	Connor Goldson	31	Aris Limassol (Cyprus)	Transfer	Summer	£1.7m	
15	MF	(Ecuador)	José Cifuentes	25	Aris Thessaloniki (Greece)	Loan	Summer	N/A	
26	DF	(England)	Ben Davies	29	Birmingham City (England)	Loan	Summer	N/A	
23	FW	(Scotland)	Scott Wright	27	Birmingham City (England)	Transfer	Summer	£0.3m	
13	MF	(England)	Todd Cantwell	26	Blackburn Rovers (England)	Transfer	Summer	£0.5m	
20	MF	(England)	Kieran Dowell	27	Birmingham City (England)	Loan	Winter	N/A	
17	FW	(Wales)	Rabbi Matondo	24	Hannover 96 (Germany)	Loan	Winter	N/A	
38	DF	(Scotland)	Leon King	21	Queen's Park	Loan	Winter	N/A	

===== Academy =====
No.	Pos.	Nat.	Name	Age	Moving to	Type	Transfer window	Transfer fee	Source
54	MF	(Scotland)	Mackenzie Strachan	20	Annan Athletic	End of contract	Summer	Free	
69	GK	(Scotland)	Jacob Pazikas	19	Stranraer	Loan	Summer	N/A	
48	MF	(Scotland)	Arron Lyall	20	Greenock Morton	End of contract	Summer	Free	
49	GK	(Scotland)	Jay Hogarth	20	Queen of the South	Loan	Summer	N/A	
90	FW	(Scotland)	Kieron Willox	18	Stoke City (England)	End of contract	Summer	Free	
92	FW	(Scotland)	James Graham	20	Stirling Albion	End of contract	Summer	Free	
46	DF	(England)	Johnly Yfeko	21	Exeter City (England)	Loan	Summer	N/A	
	DF	(Scotland)	Jack Harkness	20	Stirling Albion	Loan	Summer	N/A	
56	MF	(Scotland)	Connor Allan	20	Kelty Hearts	Loan	Summer	N/A	
57	DF	(Scotland)	Greig Allen	19	Bonnyrigg Rose	Loan	Summer	N/A	
41	GK	(Scotland)	Lewis Budinauckas	22	Greenock Morton	Emergency Loan	Summer	N/A	
47	DF	(Scotland)	Robbie Fraser	21	Livingston	Loan	Winter	N/A	
48	MF	(Scotland)	Cole McKinnon	21	Ayr United	Loan	Winter	N/A	
65	DF	(Scotland)	Leyton Grant	18	Stirling Albion	Loan	Winter	N/A	
64	DF	(Scotland)	Kristian Webster	19	Dumbarton	Loan	Winter	N/A	
51	MF	(Scotland)	Alex Lowry	21	Wycombe Wanderers (England)	Transfer	Winter	Undisclosed	
67	FW	(Wales)	Josh Gentles	17	Alloa Athletic	Loan	Winter	N/A	
53	FW	(England)	Archie Stevens	19	Dunfermline Athletic	Loan	Winter	N/A	
79	MF	(Northern Ireland)	Blaine McClure	17	Kelty Hearts	Loan	Winter	N/A	
44	DF	(Scotland)	Adam Devine	21	Queen's Park	Loan	Winter	N/A	
56	MF	(Scotland)	Connor Allan	21	Falkirk	Transfer	Winter	Undisclosed	
55	FW	(England)	Zak Lovelace	19	Millwall (England)	Transfer	Winter	Undisclosed	
	MF	(Montserrat)	Arian Allen	17	Stockport County (England)	Transfer	Winter	Undisclosed	
	MF	(Scotland)	Darren McInally	20	Cumbernauld Colts	Loan	Winter	N/A	
69	GK	(Scotland)	Jacob Pazikas	20	Gala Fairydean Rovers	Loan	Winter	N/A	
41	GK	(Scotland)	Lewis Budinauckas	22	Partick Thistle	Loan	Winter	N/A	
49	GK	(Scotland)	Jay Hogarth	21	Dunfermline Athletic	Emergency Loan	Winter	N/A	
46	DF	(England)	Johnly Yfeko	22	Exeter City (England)	Transfer	Summer	Undisclosed	

==== New contracts ====
===== First team =====
N	P	Nat.	Name	Age	Date signed	Contract length	Expiry date	Source
27	DF	(Nigeria)	Leon Balogun	35	1 June	1 year	31 May 2025	
21	DF	(England)	Dujon Sterling	24	1 October	4 years	31 May 2028	

===== Academy =====
N	P	Nat.	Name	Age	Date signed	Contract length	Expiry date	Source
65	DF	(Scotland)	Leyton Grant	18	28 May	1 year	31 May 2025	
52	MF	(Scotland)	Findlay Curtis	17	28 May	1 year	31 May 2025	
61	MF	(Scotland)	Kerr Robertson	18	12 June	1 year	31 May 2025	
	MF	(Scotland)	Darren McInally	20	17 June	1 year	31 May 2025	
64	DF	(Scotland)	Kristian Webster	19	18 June	1 year	31 May 2025	
47	DF	(Scotland)	Robbie Fraser	21	24 June	2 years	31 May 2026	
41	GK	(Scotland)	Lewis Budinauckas	22	25 June	1 year	31 May 2025	
54	GK	(Northern Ireland)	Mason Munn	18	26 June	4 years	31 May 2028	
	DF	(Scotland)	Jack Caldwell	16	14 January	2 years	31 May 2027	
	MF	(Scotland)	Aiden Crilly	16	14 January	2 years	31 May 2027	
52	MF	(Scotland)	Findlay Curtis	18	29 January	2 years	31 May 2027	
87	GK	(Scotland)	Rydnn McGuire	16	29 January	2 years	31 May 2027	
74	DF	(Scotland)	Arran Kerr	17	4 March	1 year	31 May 2026	

=== Awards ===
N	P	Nat.	Name	Award	Date	From	Source
29	FW	(Morocco)	Hamza Igamane	Premiership Player of the Month	January	Scottish Professional Football League	

== Pre-season and friendlies ==
6 July 2024 Friendly	Rangers	5–2	Hamilton Academical	Milngavie, Scotland
	McCausland; Dessers; McKinnon; Wright; Cantwell	Report		Stadium: Rangers Training Centre
Note: The match was played behind closed doors.

10 July 2024 Friendly	Standard Liège	0–0	Rangers	Venlo, Netherlands
16:30 CEST (UTC+2)		Report

13 July 2024 Friendly	Ajax	2–1	Rangers	Wezep, Netherlands
16:00 CEST (UTC+2)	Fitz-Jim 27'; Van den Boomen 41'	Report	Lawrence 33'	Stadium: Sportpark Mulderssingel; Referee: Jeroen Manschot

20 July 2024 Friendly	Manchester United	2–0	Rangers	Edinburgh, Scotland
16:00 BST (UTC+1)	Diallo 39'; Hugill 70'	Report		Stadium: Murrayfield Stadium; Attendance: 56,574; Referee: Don Robertson

24 July 2024 Friendly	Birmingham City	2–1	Rangers	Birmingham, England
19:30 BST (UTC+1)	Tavernier 10' (o.g.); May 36'	Report	Wright 68'	Stadium: St Andrew's; Attendance: 19,009; Referee: Tom Reeves
Note: Memorial Match for Trevor Francis.

27 July 2024 Friendly	Union Berlin	4–4	Rangers	Berlin, Germany
17:00 CEST (UTC+2)	Haberer 5', 41'; Pefok 21' (pen.); Preu 59'	Report	Dessers 13', 68'; Lawrence 32', 37'	Stadium: Stadion An der Alten Försterei; Attendance: 21,108; Referee: Florian Lechner

== Competitions ==
Win Draw Loss Postponed

=== Overall ===
Competition	First match	Last match	Starting round	Final position	Record							
Competition	First match	Last match	Starting round	Final position	Pld	W	D	L	GF	GA	GD	Win %
Scottish Premiership	3 August 2024	17 May 2025	Matchday 1	2nd	38	22	9	7	80	41	+39	57.89
Scottish Cup	19 January 2025	9 February 2025	Fourth round	Fifth round	2	1	0	1	5	1	+4	50.00
Scottish League Cup	17 August 2024	15 December 2024	Second round	Runners-up	4	3	1	0	10	4	+6	75.00
UEFA Champions League	6 August 2024	13 August 2024	Third qualifying round	Third qualifying round	2	0	1	1	1	3	−2	0.00
UEFA Europa League	26 September 2024	17 April 2025	League phase	Quarter-finals	12	5	3	4	19	15	+4	41.67
Total					58	31	14	13	115	64	+51	53.45

Source: Competitions

=== Scottish Premiership ===
==== League table ====
Pos	Team	Pld	W	D	L	GF	GA	GD	Pts	Qualification or relegation (Note: Teams play each other three times (33 matches), before the league is split into two groups (the top six and the bottom six).)
1	Celtic (C)	38	29	5	4	112	26	+86	92	Qualification for the Champions League play-off round
2	Rangers	38	22	9	7	80	41	+39	75	Qualification for the Champions League second qualifying round
3	Hibernian	38	15	13	10	62	50	+12	58	Qualification for the Europa League second qualifying round
4	Dundee United	38	15	8	15	45	54	−9	53	Qualification for the Conference League second qualifying round
5	Aberdeen	38	15	8	15	48	61	−13	53	Qualification for the Europa League play-off round (Note: Aberdeen qualified for the Europa League play-off round as the 2024–25 Scottish Cup winners.)

Rules for classification: 1) Points; 2) Goal difference; 3) Goals scored; 4) Head-to-head points; 5) Head-to-head goal difference; 6) Play-off (only if deciding champion, UEFA competitions qualification, second stage group allocation or relegation).
(C) Champions

==== Results by round ====
Round	1	2	3	4	5	6	7	8	9	10	11	12	13	14	15	16	17	18	19	20	21	22	23	24	25	26	27	28	29	30	31	32	33	34	35	36	37	38
Ground	A	H	H	A	A	H	H	A	H	A	H	H	A	H	A	H	A	A	H	A	A	H	H	A	H	A	H	A	H	A	A	H	A	A	H	H	H	A
Result	D	W	W	L	W	W	W	L	W	L	W	D	W	W	W	W	L	D	W	D	D	W	W	W	W	W	L	W	L	W	W	L	D	D	D	W	W	D
Position	8	4	3	4	3	3	3	3	3	3	3	3	3	3	3	2	2	2	2	2	2	2	2	2	2	2	2	2	2	2	2	2	2	2	2	2	2	2
Points	1	4	7	7	10	13	16	16	19	19	22	23	26	29	32	35	35	36	39	40	41	44	47	50	53	56	56	59	59	62	65	65	66	67	68	71	74	75

A = Away; H = Home; W = Win; D = Draw; L = Loss

==== Matches ====
3 August 2024 1	Heart of Midlothian	0–0	Rangers	Edinburgh
12:30	Devlin (yellow card) 33'; Rowles (yellow card) 54'; Oyegoke (yellow card) 90+5'	Report	Diomande (yellow card) 64'	Stadium: Tynecastle Park; Attendance: 18,478; Referee: Nick Walsh

10 August 2024 2	Rangers	2–1	Motherwell	Glasgow
15:00	Dessers 13'; Černý 24'; Pröpper (yellow card) 53'; Yılmaz (yellow card) 89'	Report	Pröpper 17' (o.g.)	Stadium: Hampden Park; Attendance: 48,529; Referee: Kevin Clancy

24 August 2024 3	Rangers	6–0	Ross County	Glasgow
15:00	Dessers 18', 58'; Matondo 45', 69'; Lawrence 65'; Jefté (yellow card) 75'; Danilo 90'	Report	Wright (yellow card) 45+2'; Harmon (yellow card) 49'; Chilvers (yellow card) 79'	Stadium: Hampden Park; Attendance: 48,832; Referee: Ross Hardie

1 September 2024 4	Celtic	3–0	Rangers	Glasgow
12:30	Maeda 17'; Johnston (yellow card) 21'; Furuhashi 40'; Kühn (yellow card) 71'; McGregor 75'; Taylor (yellow card) 89'; Engels (yellow card) 90+2'	Report	Jefté (yellow card) 19'; Diomande (yellow card) 21'; Sterling (yellow card) 37'; Dessers (yellow card) 67'; Lawrence (yellow card) 68'	Stadium: Celtic Park; Attendance: 59,612; Referee: John Beaton

15 September 2024 5	Dundee United	0–1	Rangers	Dundee
12:00	Trapanovski (yellow card) 19'; Gallagher (yellow card) 33'; Adegboyega (yellow card) 44'; Graham (yellow card) 58'	Report	Lawrence 7'; Tavernier (yellow card) 19'; Butland (yellow card) 44'; Sterling (yellow card) 75'; Jefté (yellow card) 80'; Raskin (yellow card) 90+2'; Bajrami (yellow card) 90+3'	Stadium: Tannadice Park; Attendance: 14,268; Referee: Don Robertson

29 September 2024 6	Rangers	1–0	Hibernian	Glasgow
12:00	Lawrence 34'; Pröpper (yellow card) 53'; Dowell (yellow card) 76'	Report	Triantis (yellow card) 27'; Kukharevych (penalty missed) 45+2'; O'Hora (yellow card) 90+5'	Stadium: Ibrox Stadium; Attendance: 48,217; Referee: Nick Walsh

6 October 2024 7	Rangers	2–0	St Johnstone	Glasgow
20:00	Černý 34', 58'; Raskin (yellow card) 63'; Hagi (red card) 81'	Report	Essel (yellow card) 22'	Stadium: Ibrox Stadium; Attendance: 44,744; Referee: David Dickinson

20 October 2024 8	Kilmarnock	1–0	Rangers	Kilmarnock
12:00	Kennedy (yellow card) 59'; Watkins 87'	Report	Tavernier (yellow card) 27'; Lawrence (yellow card) 59'; Pröpper (yellow card) 62'	Stadium: Rugby Park; Attendance: 8,924; Referee: Steven McLean

27 October 2024 9	Rangers	2–1	St Mirren	Glasgow
15:00	Igamane (yellow card) 2'; Diomande 13'; Raskin (yellow card) 63'; Černý 69'	Report	Gogić 26'; Phillips (yellow card) 52'; O'Hara (yellow card) 57'	Stadium: Ibrox Stadium; Attendance: 48,859; Referee: Calum Scott

30 October 2024 10	Aberdeen	2–1	Rangers	Aberdeen
19:45	Sokler (yellow card) 28'; Devlin 31'; McGrath (penalty missed) 38'; MacKenzie (yellow card) 50'; Nilsen (yellow card) 51'; Mitov (yellow card) 61'; Morris 74'; Molloy (yellow card) 90+1'	Report	McCausland (yellow card) 23'; Bajrami 63'; Balogun (yellow card) 78'; Sterling (yellow card) 84'; Raskin (yellow card) 90+2'	Stadium: Pittodrie Stadium; Attendance: 19,274; Referee: John Beaton

10 November 2024 11	Rangers	1–0	Heart of Midlothian	Glasgow
17:00	Dessers 6'; Diomande (yellow card) 74'; Sterling (yellow card) 80'	Report	Devlin (yellow card) 57'; Oyegoke (yellow card) 67'; Dhanda (yellow card) 89'	Stadium: Ibrox Stadium; Attendance: 48,254; Referee: Matthew MacDermid

23 November 2024 12	Rangers	1–1	Dundee United	Glasgow
15:00	Černý 66', (yellow card) 90+8'	Report	Dalby 36'; Stephenson (yellow card) 51'; Walton (yellow card) 55'; Middleton (yellow card) 90+6'	Stadium: Ibrox Stadium; Attendance: 47,714; Referee: Don Robertson

1 December 2024 13	St Johnstone	0–1	Rangers	Perth
12:00	Raymond (yellow card) 21'; Sprangler (yellow card) 45+3'	Report	Holt 63' (o.g.); Raskin (yellow card) 85'; Hagi (yellow card) 88'	Stadium: McDiarmid Park; Attendance: 7,446; Referee: Steven McLean

4 December 2024 14	Rangers	6–0	Kilmarnock	Glasgow
19:45	Tavernier 37'; Danilo 53'; Igamane 55'; Černý 61'; Dessers 69', 77'	Report	Bainbridge (yellow card) 45+4'; Polworth (yellow card) 62'	Stadium: Ibrox Stadium; Attendance: 44,188; Referee: Nick Walsh

8 December 2024 15	Ross County	0–3	Rangers	Dingwall
12:00	Efete (yellow card) 42'	Report	Igamane 6'; Danilo 37'; Tavernier 86'; Dessers (yellow card) 90+2'	Stadium: Victoria Park; Attendance: 6,011; Referee: Kevin Clancy

21 December 2024 16	Rangers	1–0	Dundee	Glasgow
15:00	Černý 46'; Pröpper (yellow card) 67'; Jefté (yellow card) 74'	Report	Sylla (yellow card) 50'; Mulligan (yellow card) 90+2'	Stadium: Ibrox Stadium; Attendance: 47,208; Referee: Matthew MacDermid

26 December 2024 17	St Mirren	2–1	Rangers	Paisley
17:45	Smyth 30' (pen.); Idowu (yellow card) 59'; Boyd-Munce 90+3'	Report	Butland (yellow card) 28'; Černý (yellow card) 37'; Diomande (yellow card) 45+4'; Danilo 61'	Stadium: St Mirren Park; Attendance: 7,175; Referee: David Dickinson

29 December 2024 18	Motherwell	2–2	Rangers	Motherwell
15:00	Stamatelopoulos 16'; Maswanhise 35'; Miller (yellow card) 53'; Sparrow (yellow card) 90'; Watt (yellow card) 90+9'; Nicholson (yellow card) 90+12'	Report	Pröpper (yellow card) 14'; Igamane 50', 68'; Sterling (yellow card) 87'; Černý (yellow card) 90+9'	Stadium: Fir Park; Attendance: 8,728; Referee: Kevin Clancy

2 January 2025 19	Rangers	3–0	Celtic	Glasgow
15:00	Hagi 7'; Jefté (yellow card) 45+2'; Raskin (yellow card) 45+6'; Pröpper 66'; Danilo 81'	Report	McGregor (yellow card) 33'; Kühn (yellow card) 61'	Stadium: Ibrox Stadium; Attendance: 51,065; Referee: Don Robertson

5 January 2025 20	Hibernian	3–3	Rangers	Edinburgh
12:00	Boyle 33', 61' (pen.); Cadden (yellow card) 45+2'; Bushiri 83'	Report	Igamane 4', 19', 74'; Pröpper (yellow card) 86'	Stadium: Easter Road; Attendance: 17,539; Referee: John Beaton

9 January 2025 21	Dundee	1–1	Rangers	Dundee
20:00	Adewumi 6'	Report	Jefté (yellow card) 22'; Černý 34'; McCausland (yellow card) 85'	Stadium: Dens Park; Attendance: 8,606; Referee: Calum Scott

12 January 2025 22	Rangers	3–1	St Johnstone	Glasgow
15:00	Igamane 16'; Černý 20'; Diomande 25'	Report	Sanders 54'	Stadium: Ibrox Stadium; Attendance: 45,818; Referee: Ross Hardie

15 January 2025 23	Rangers	3–0	Aberdeen	Glasgow
20:00	Igamane 13'; Nsiala (yellow card) 44'; Balogun 90+3'; Dessers 90+7'	Report	Tobers (yellow card) 37'; Clarkson (yellow card) 74'; Nilsen (yellow card) 83'	Stadium: Ibrox Stadium; Attendance: 45,887; Referee: Kevin Clancy

26 January 2025 24	Dundee United	1–3	Rangers	Dundee
12:00	Dalby 19'; Ferry (yellow card) 38'; Middleton (yellow card) 68'; Gallagher (yellow card) 73'; Ševelj (yellow card) 90+5'	Report	Diomande 37', (red card) 90+5'; Pröpper 49'; Tavernier (yellow card) 55'; Dessers 86'	Stadium: Tannadice Park; Attendance: 13,653; Referee: Nick Walsh

2 February 2025 25	Rangers	4–0	Ross County	Glasgow
15:00	Hagi 18', 25'; Souttar 36'; Tavernier 79' (pen.)	Report	Randall (yellow card) 8'	Stadium: Ibrox Stadium; Attendance: 46,973; Referee: Steven McLean

16 February 2025 26	Heart of Midlothian	1–3	Rangers	Edinburgh
12:00	Steinwender 49'; Baningime (yellow card) 66'	Report	Hagi (yellow card) 17'; McCart 20', 73' (o.g.); Černý 61'	Stadium: Tynecastle Park; Attendance: 18,356; Referee: John Beaton

22 February 2025 27	Rangers	0–2	St Mirren	Glasgow
15:00	Igamane (yellow card) 45+2'	Report	Mandron (yellow card) 33', (goal) 51'; Ayunga (yellow card) 42'; Olusanya 70'	Stadium: Ibrox Stadium; Attendance: 49,994; Referee: Kevin Clancy

26 February 2025 28	Kilmarnock	2–4	Rangers	Kilmarnock
20:00	Wright 11'; Lyons 14'; Magennis (yellow card) 18'; Watson (yellow card) 83'	Report	Hagi (yellow card) 18'; Černý 35'; Dessers 53', 62', (yellow card) 63'; Pröpper (yellow card) 72'; Lawrence (yellow card) 83'; Bajrami 85'	Stadium: Rugby Park; Attendance: 8,751; Referee: Don Robertson

1 March 2025 29	Rangers	1–2	Motherwell	Glasgow
15:00	Jefté (yellow card) 49'; Dessers 54'; Bajrami (yellow card) 90+3'	Report	Armstrong 9'; Sparrow 30', (yellow card) 90+2'; Halliday (yellow card) 45+6'	Stadium: Ibrox Stadium; Attendance: 50,056; Referee: Nick Walsh

16 March 2025 30	Celtic	2–3	Rangers	Glasgow
12:30	Maeda 49'; Hatate 74'	Report	Raskin 4'; Sterling (yellow card) 34'; Diomande 37'; Pröpper (yellow card) 74'; Hagi (yellow card) 77'; Igamane 88'	Stadium: Celtic Park; Attendance: 58,913; Referee: Steven McLean

29 March 2025 31	Dundee	3–4	Rangers	Dundee
17:30	Murray 2'; Sylla (yellow card) 11'; Shaughnessy 19'; Tiffoney 62'	Report	Shaughnessy 43' (o.g.); Tavernier 75'; Lawrence 81', (yellow card) 90+7'; Dessers 90+3'; Raskin (yellow card) 90+5'	Stadium: Dens Park; Attendance: 8,710; Referee: David Dickinson

5 April 2025 32	Rangers	0–2	Hibernian	Glasgow
15:00	Tavernier (yellow card) 42'	Report	Levitt 8'; Hoilett (yellow card) 55'; Boyle (yellow card) 65', (goal) 69'; Campbell (yellow card) 77'	Stadium: Ibrox Stadium; Attendance: 50,922; Referee: Don Robertson

13 April 2025 33	Aberdeen	2–2	Rangers	Aberdeen
12:00	Clarkson 31'; Guèye 44'; Palaversa (yellow card) 53'	Report	McCausland (yellow card) 30' (yellow-red card) 40'; Igamane 49'; Hagi (yellow card) 87', (goal) 90+6'	Stadium: Pittodrie Stadium; Attendance: 18,863; Referee: Steven McLean

26 April 2025 34	St Mirren	2–2	Rangers	Paisley
15:00	O'Hara 44'; Phillips (yellow card) 59'; McMenamin 73'; Taylor (yellow card) 84'; Gogić (yellow card) 90+3'	Report	Dessers 42'; Raskin 52', (yellow card) 55'	Stadium: St Mirren Park; Attendance: 7,019; Referee: Colin Steven

4 May 2025 35	Rangers	1–1	Celtic	Glasgow
12:00	Dessers 44'; Rice (yellow card) 88'	Report	Idah 57'; Kenny (yellow card) 90'	Stadium: Ibrox Stadium; Attendance: 50,202; Referee: Nick Walsh

11 May 2025 36	Rangers	4–0	Aberdeen	Glasgow
12:00	Černý 55'; Dessers 61'; Diomande (yellow card) 67'; Igamane 70'; Souttar (yellow card) 90+1'; Jefté 90+3'	Report	Tobers (yellow card) 34'; Shinnie (yellow card) 62'; McGrath (yellow card) 89'	Stadium: Ibrox Stadium; Attendance: 50,343; Referee: David Dickinson

14 May 2025 37	Rangers	3–1	Dundee United	Glasgow
19:45	Dessers 25', 73' (pen.); Raskin 75'	Report	Cleall-Harding 20'; Ševelj (yellow card) 60'	Stadium: Ibrox Stadium; Attendance: 49,361; Referee: Calum Scott

17 May 2025 38	Hibernian	2–2	Rangers	Edinburgh
12:30	Bowie 16', (yellow card) 30'; Moriah-Welsh (yellow card) 60'; Boyle 66', (yellow card) 68'	Report	Dessers 2'; Diomande (yellow card) 31'; Raskin 50'; Kasanwirjo (yellow card) 60'	Stadium: Easter Road; Attendance: 18,793; Referee: Nick Walsh

=== Scottish Cup ===
19 January 2025 Fourth round	Rangers	5–0	Fraserburgh	Glasgow
14:15	Dessers 27', 57', 90'; Nsiala 52'; McCausland 74'	Report	Young (yellow card) 58'	Stadium: Ibrox Stadium; Attendance: 36,276; Referee: Iain Snedden

9 February 2025 Fifth round	Rangers	0–1	Queen's Park	Glasgow
15:30	Tavernier (penalty missed) 90+7'	Report	Drozd 69'	Stadium: Ibrox Stadium; Attendance: 35,628; Referee: Calum Scott

=== Scottish League Cup ===
17 August 2024 Second round	Rangers	2–0	St Johnstone	Glasgow
17:45	Dessers 61'; McCausland 90+2'	Report	Raymond (yellow card) 56'; M Smith (yellow card) 62'; Sidibeh (yellow card) 88'	Stadium: Hampden Park; Attendance: 23,261; Referee: Matthew MacDermid

21 September 2024 Quarter-final	Rangers	3–0	Dundee	Glasgow
17:30	Dessers 18', 66'; Tavernier 50' (pen.)	Report	Sylla (yellow card) 49'	Stadium: Ibrox Stadium; Attendance: 33,665; Referee: Chris Graham

3 November 2024 Semi-final	Motherwell	1–2	Rangers	Glasgow
15:00	Halliday 25'; Balmer (yellow card) 39'; Seddon (yellow card) 52'	Report	Dessers 49'; Bajrami (yellow card) 41', (goal) 81'; Diomande (yellow card) 89'; Černý (yellow card) 90+5'	Stadium: Hampden Park; Attendance: 37,077; Referee: Nick Walsh

15 December 2024 Final	Celtic	3–3 (a.e.t.) (5–4 p)	Rangers	Glasgow
15:30	Taylor 56'; Maeda 60'; Furuhashi (yellow card) 67'; Kühn 87'; Carter-Vickers (yellow card) 90+2'; Scales (yellow card) 93'	Report	Balogun (yellow card) 24'; Bajrami 41'; Jefté (yellow card) 44'; Diomande 75'; Danilo 88'; Raskin (yellow card) 90+1'; Tavernier (yellow card) 90+4'; Igamane (yellow card) 95'; Dessers (yellow card) 102'; Sterling (yellow card) 107'; Hagi (yellow card) 111'	Stadium: Hampden Park; Attendance: 49,420; Referee: John Beaton
	Penalties
	Idah (penalty scored); McGregor (penalty scored); Engels (penalty scored); Hatate (penalty scored); Maeda (penalty scored)		(penalty scored) Tavernier; (penalty scored) Hagi; (penalty scored) Danilo; (penalty missed) Yılmaz; (penalty scored) Butland

=== UEFA Champions League ===
==== Third qualifying round ====
6 August 2024 First leg	Dynamo Kyiv (Ukraine)	1–1	(Scotland) Rangers	Lublin, Poland (Note: Due to the Russian invasion of Ukraine, Ukrainian teams are required to play their home matches at neutral venues until further notice.)
20:00 CEST (UTC+2)	Yarmolenko 37'	Report	Tavernier (yellow card) 78'; Souttar (yellow card) 84'; Dessers (yellow card) 90', (goal) 90+4'	Stadium: Arena Lublin; Attendance: 8,315; Referee: Donatas Rumšas (Lithuania)

13 August 2024 Second leg	Rangers (Scotland)	0–2 (1–3 agg.)	(Ukraine) Dynamo Kyiv	Glasgow
19:45 BST (UTC+1)	Jefté (yellow card) 31' (yellow-red card) 50'; Diomande (yellow card) 45'	Report	Pikhalyonok 82'; Voloshyn 84'	Stadium: Hampden Park; Attendance: 39,180; Referee: Marco Guida (Italy)

=== UEFA Europa League ===
==== League phase ====
Pos	Team	Pld	W	D	L	GF	GA	GD	Pts	Qualification
6	(French Football Federation) Lyon	8	4	3	1	16	8	+8	15	Advance to round of 16 (seeded)
7	(Hellenic Football Federation) Olympiacos	8	4	3	1	9	3	+6	15	Advance to round of 16 (seeded)
8	(Scottish Football Association) Rangers	8	4	2	2	16	10	+6	14	Advance to round of 16 (seeded)
9	(Norwegian Football Federation) Bodø/Glimt	8	4	2	2	14	11	+3	14	Advance to knockout phase play-offs (seeded)
10	(Royal Belgian Football Association) Anderlecht	8	4	2	2	14	12	+2	14	Advance to knockout phase play-offs (seeded)

Source: UEFA
Rules for classification: League phase tiebreakers

Round	1	2	3	4	5	6	7	8
Ground	A	H	H	A	A	H	A	H
Result	W	L	W	D	W	D	L	W
Position	6	17	11	10	8	8	13	8
Points	3	3	6	7	10	11	11	14

Source: UEFA
A = Away; H = Home; W = Win; D = Draw; L = Loss

26 September 2024 1	Malmö (Sweden)	0–2	(Scotland) Rangers	Malmö, Sweden
18:45 CEST (UTC+2)	Rösler (yellow card) 37'; Berg (yellow card) 80'	Report	Bajrami 1'; Diomande (yellow card) 11'; McCausland 76'; Butland (yellow card) 90+4'	Stadium: Stadion; Attendance: 20,021; Referee: Luís Godinho (Portugal)

3 October 2024 2	Rangers (Scotland)	1–4	(France) Lyon	Glasgow
20:00 BST (UTC+1)	Lawrence 14'; Souttar (yellow card) 24'; Barron (yellow card) 53'	Report	Fofana 10', 55'; Lacazette 19', 45+1'; Cherki (yellow card) 65'; Veretout (yellow card) 72'; Benrahma (yellow card) 83'	Stadium: Ibrox Stadium; Attendance: 41,981; Referee: Sven Jablonski (Germany)

24 October 2024 3	Rangers (Scotland)	4–0	(Romania) FCSB	Glasgow
20:00 BST (UTC+1)	Lawrence 10'; Tavernier (yellow card) 24'; Černý 31', 55', (yellow card) 38'; Igamane 71'; Barron (yellow card) 81'	Report	Luis Phelipe (yellow card) 16'; Ștefănescu (yellow card) 35'; Popescu (yellow card) 43'; Băluță (yellow card) 77'	Stadium: Ibrox Stadium; Attendance: 41,191; Referee: Marco Di Bello (Italy)

7 November 2024 4	Olympiacos (Greece)	1–1	(Scotland) Rangers	Piraeus, Greece
18:45 EET (UTC+2)	El Kaabi 56'; David Carmo (yellow card) 65'; Kostoulas (yellow card) 88'	Report	Dessers 64'; Jefté (yellow card) 69'; Igamane (yellow card) 87'; Raskin (yellow card) 90+5'	Stadium: Karaiskakis Stadium; Attendance: 31,795; Referee: Sascha Stegemann (Germany)

28 November 2024 5	Nice (France)	1–4	(Scotland) Rangers	Nice, France
21:00 CET (UTC+1)	Camara (yellow card) 45'; Louchet (yellow card) 81'; Bouanani 83'	Report	Černý 35'; Diomande 38', (yellow card) 44'; Igamane 45+3', 54'; Rice (yellow card) 82'	Stadium: Allianz Riviera; Attendance: 18,008; Referee: Ricardo de Burgos Bengoetxea (Spain)

12 December 2024 6	Rangers (Scotland)	1–1	(England) Tottenham Hotspur	Glasgow
20:00 GMT (UTC+0)	Diomande (yellow card) 20'; Igamane 47'	Report	Drăgușin (yellow card) 68'; Bergvall (yellow card) 72'; Kulusevski 75'	Stadium: Ibrox Stadium; Attendance: 48,064; Referee: Sandro Schärer (Switzerland)

23 January 2025 7	Manchester United (England)	2–1	(Scotland) Rangers	Manchester, England
20:00 GMT (UTC+0)	Butland 52' (o.g.); Fernandes 90+2'	Report	Jefté (yellow card) 80'; Dessers 88'	Stadium: Old Trafford; Attendance: 73,288; Referee: Erik Lambrechts (Belgium)

30 January 2025 8	Rangers (Scotland)	2–1	(Belgium) Union Saint-Gilloise	Glasgow
20:00 GMT (UTC+0)	Raskin 20', (yellow card) 89'; McCausland (yellow card) 34'; Igamane (yellow card) 45+2'; Černý 55'; Diomande (yellow card) 83'; Pröpper (yellow card) 90+2'	Report	Leysen (yellow card) 52'; Mac Allister 83'; Sykes (yellow card) 90+6'	Stadium: Ibrox Stadium; Attendance: 46,993; Referee: Damian Sylwestrzak (Poland)

==== Round of 16 ====
6 March 2025 First leg	Fenerbahçe (Turkey)	1–3	(Scotland) Rangers	Istanbul, Turkey
20:45 EEST (UTC+3)	Djiku 30'; Talisca (yellow card) 67'	Report	Dessers 6'; Černý 42', 81'; Souttar (yellow card) 54'	Stadium: Şükrü Saracoğlu Stadium; Attendance: 42,090; Referee: Alejandro Hernández Hernández (Spain)

13 March 2025 Second leg	Rangers (Scotland)	0–2 (a.e.t.) (3–3 agg.) (3–2 p)	(Turkey) Fenerbahçe	Glasgow
20:00 GMT (UTC+0)	Sterling (yellow card) 25'; Balogun (yellow card) 30'; Souttar (yellow card) 37'; Diomande (yellow card) 45+2'; Dessers (yellow card) 45+2'; Hagi (yellow card) 90+3'; Yılmaz (yellow card) 116'	Report	Talisca (yellow card) 19'; Yandaş (yellow card) 20'; Szymański 45', 73'; Djiku (yellow card) 108'; Kahveci (yellow card) 117'	Stadium: Ibrox Stadium; Attendance: 50,061; Referee: Espen Eskås (Norway)
	Penalties
	Tavernier (penalty scored); Černý (penalty scored); Hagi (penalty missed); Lawrence (penalty scored)		(penalty missed) Tadić; (penalty scored) Džeko; (penalty scored) Djiku; (penalty missed) Fred; (penalty missed) Yandaş

==== Quarter-finals ====
10 April 2025 First leg	Rangers (Scotland)	0–0	(Spain) Athletic Bilbao	Glasgow
20:00 BST (UTC+1)	Pröpper (red card) 13'	Report	Ruiz de Galarreta (yellow card) 28'; Sannadi (yellow card) 54'; Berenguer (penalty missed) 82'; Prados (yellow card) 90+11'	Stadium: Ibrox Stadium; Attendance: 50,076; Referee: István Kovács (Romania)

17 April 2025 Second leg	Athletic Bilbao (Spain)	2–0 (2–0 agg.)	(Scotland) Rangers	Bilbao, Spain
21:00 CEST (UTC+2)	Sancet 45+4' (pen.), (yellow card) 51'; N. Williams 80'	Report	Dessers (yellow card) 19'; Balogun (yellow card) 32'; Tavernier (yellow card) 77'	Stadium: San Mamés; Attendance: 52,114; Referee: Irfan Peljto (Bosnia and Herzegovina)

== Club ==
=== First Team Staff ===
Name	Role
Manager	(Belgium) Philippe Clement (until February 23, 2025) (Scotland) Barry Ferguson
Assistant Manager	(Belgium) Stephan Van Der Heyden (until February 23, 2025) (Scotland) Billy Dodds
First Team Coach	(Scotland) Alex Rae (until February 23, 2025) (Scotland) Neil McCann
Goalkeeping Coach	(Scotland) Colin Stewart (until February 23, 2025) (Scotland) Allan McGregor

== Squad statistics ==
The table below includes all players registered with the SPFL as part of the Rangers squad for the 2024–25 season. They may not have made an appearance.

=== Appearances and goals ===
No.	Pos.	Nat.	Name	Totals		Scottish Premiership		Scottish Cup		League Cup		Champions League		Europa League	
No.	Pos.	Nat.	Name	Apps	Goals	Apps	Goals	Apps	Goals	Apps	Goals	Apps	Goals	Apps	Goals
Goalkeepers
1	GK	(England) ENG	Jack Butland	44	0	28	0	0	0	4	0	2	0	10	0
31	GK	(Scotland) SCO	Liam Kelly	13	0	10	0	1	0	0	0	0	0	2	0
54	GK	(Northern Ireland) NIR	Mason Munn	1	0	0	0	1	0	0	0	0	0	0	0
Defenders
2	DF	(England) ENG	James Tavernier (captain)	53	5	30+3	4	2	0	4	1	2	0	10+2	0
3	DF	(Turkey) TUR	Rıdvan Yılmaz	29	0	11+6	0	0+2	0	0+1	0	2	0	5+2	0
4	DF	(Netherlands) NED	Robin Pröpper	43	2	22+5	2	2	0	3	0	1	0	9+1	0
5	DF	(Scotland) SCO	John Souttar	40	1	24	1	0+1	0	3	0	2	0	9+1	0
19	DF	(France) FRA	Clinton Nsiala	13	1	10+1	0	1	1	0	0	0	0	0+1	0
21	DF	(England) ENG	Dujon Sterling	34	0	11+9	0	0	0	2+2	0	0+2	0	4+4	0
22	DF	(Brazil) BRA	Jefté	52	1	30+3	1	2	0	4	0	1+1	0	10+1	0
24	DF	(Netherlands) NED	Neraysho Kasanwirjo	15	0	3+6	0	0	0	0+2	0	0	0	1+3	0
27	DF	(Nigeria) NGR	Leon Balogun	30	1	13+7	1	0	0	2	0	1	0	5+2	0
28	DF	(Portugal) POR	Rafael Fernandes	4	0	1+2	0	1	0	0	0	0	0	0	0
Midfielders
8	MF	(Scotland) SCO	Connor Barron	46	0	23+5	0	1	0	2+2	0	2	0	8+3	0
10	MF	(Ivory Coast) CIV	Mohamed Diomande	54	6	32+4	4	2	0	2+2	1	2	0	9+1	1
14	MF	(Albania) ALB	Nedim Bajrami	44	5	17+11	2	2	0	3	2	0	0	8+3	1
30	MF	(Romania) ROU	Ianis Hagi	31	4	16+8	4	1+1	0	1	0	0	0	2+2	0
43	MF	(Belgium) BEL	Nicolas Raskin	48	5	30+3	4	0+1	0	2	0	0	0	10+2	1
49	MF	(Scotland) SCO	Bailey Rice	12	0	1+6	0	1+1	0	0	0	0	0	1+2	0
52	MF	(Scotland) SCO	Findlay Curtis	5	0	1+2	0	0+1	0	0	0	0	0	0+1	0
55	MF	(England) ENG	Paul Nsio	2	0	0+1	0	0	0	0	0	0	0	0+1	0
Forwards
7	FW	(Colombia) COL	Óscar Cortés	11	0	4+6	0	0	0	0+1	0	0	0	0	0
9	FW	(Nigeria) NGR	Cyriel Dessers	55	29	24+11	18	1+1	3	2+2	4	2	1	9+3	3
11	FW	(Wales) WAL	Tom Lawrence	28	6	8+10	4	0+1	0	2	0	2	0	3+2	2
18	FW	(Czech Republic) CZE	Václav Černý	52	18	30+3	12	1	0	4	0	0+2	0	12	6
29	FW	(Morocco) MAR	Hamza Igamane	46	16	23+10	12	1	0	1+1	0	0	0	4+6	4
45	FW	(Northern Ireland) NIR	Ross McCausland	25	3	4+9	0	1	1	0+2	1	1+1	0	0+7	1
99	FW	(Brazil) BRA	Danilo	27	6	8+15	5	0	0	1+2	1	0	0	0+1	0
Players transferred or loaned out during the season who made an appearance
17	FW	(Wales) WAL	Rabbi Matondo	8	2	2+4	2	0	0	1	0	0+1	0	0	0
20	MF	(England) ENG	Kieran Dowell	16	0	2+10	0	0	0	1+1	0	0+1	0	0+1	0
23	FW	(Scotland) SCO	Scott Wright	3	0	2	0	0	0	0	0	1	0	0	0
26	DF	(England) ENG	Ben Davies	3	0	1	0	0	0	0+1	0	0+1	0	0	0
38	DF	(Scotland) SCO	Leon King	5	0	0+2	0	0+1	0	0	0	0	0	1+1	0
47	DF	(Scotland) SCO	Robbie Fraser	4	0	0+2	0	0	0	0+1	0	0	0	0+1	0
50	FW	(England) ENG	Zak Lovelace	4	0	0+1	0	1	0	0	0	0	0	0+2	0

- Last updated: 17 May 2025

Appearances (starts and substitute appearances) and goals include those in Scottish Premiership, Scottish Cup, Scottish League Cup and UEFA Champions League.

=== Discipline ===
==== Yellow cards ====
As of match played on 17 May 2025

Colour	Player	Cards
Yellow card
Yellow card	Mohamed Diomande	13
Yellow card	Jefté	12
Yellow card	Nicolas Raskin	11
Yellow card	Robin Pröpper	9
Yellow card	Dujon Sterling	8
Yellow card	James Tavernier	8
Yellow card	Cyriel Dessers	7
Yellow card	Ianis Hagi	7
Yellow card	Václav Černý	5
Yellow card	Hamza Igamane	5
Yellow card	Ross McCausland	5
Yellow card	John Souttar	5
Yellow card	Leon Balogun	4
Yellow card	Tom Lawrence	4
Yellow card	Nedim Bajrami	3
Yellow card	Jack Butland	3
Yellow card	Connor Barron	2
Yellow card	Bailey Rice	2
Yellow card	Rıdvan Yılmaz	2
Yellow card	Kieran Dowell	1
Yellow card	Neraysho Kasanwirjo	1
Yellow card	Clinton Nsiala	1

==== Red cards ====
As of match played on 17 May 2025

Colour	Player	Cards
Red card
Red card	Mohamed Diomande	1
Red card	Ianis Hagi	1
Red card	Jefté	1
Red card	Ross McCausland	1
Red card	Robin Pröpper	1

=== Clean sheets ===
As of match played on 17 May 2025

No.	Player	Scottish Premiership	Scottish Cup	League Cup	Champions League	Europa League	Total	Appearances
1	Jack Butland	10	0	2	0	2	14	44
31	Liam Kelly	4	0	0	0	1	5	13
54	Mason Munn	0	1	0	0	0	1	1
Total		14	1	2	0	3	20	58
