= Clinton Nsiala =

French footballer (born 2004)

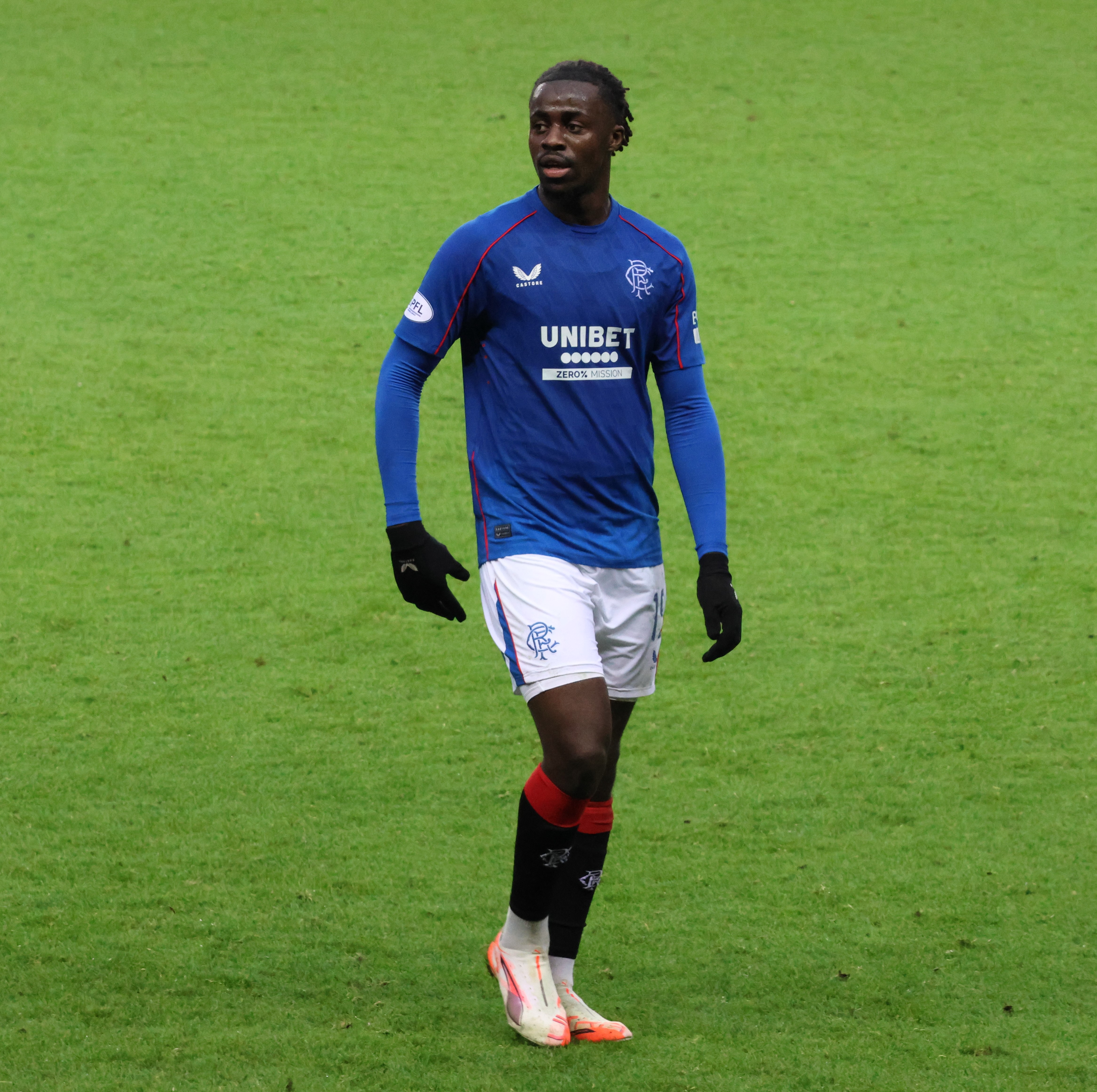
- Nsiala in 2025

Personal information
- Full name: Clinton Nsiala-Makengo
- Date of birth: 17 January 2004 (age 22)
- Place of birth: Rennes, France
- Height: 1.89 m (6 ft 2 in)
- Positions: Centre-back; left-back; defensive midfielder

Team information
- Current team: Sharjah
- Number: 31

Youth career
- 2010–2019: CPB Bréquigny
- 2019–2021: Nantes
- 2021–2024: AC Milan
- 2024: Rangers

Senior career*
Years	Team	Apps	(Gls)
2023–2024	AC Milan	0	(0)
2024–2026	Rangers	14	(0)
2026	→ Westerlo (loan)	4	(0)
2026–	Sharjah	1	(0)

International career
2020	France U16	3	(1)
- * Club domestic league appearances and goals as of 18 October 2026

Clinton Nsiala-Makengo (born 17 January 2004) is a French professional footballer who plays as a centre-back, left-back, or defensive midfielder for UAE Pro League club Sharjah.

== Club career ==
=== Youth career ===
Born in Rennes, Nsiala started playing football with Cercle Paul Bert de Bréquigny, before joining the youth academy of Nantes in 2019.

=== AC Milan ===
On 2021, he joined Italian club AC Milan on a free transfer, signing his first professional contract. He was subsequently assigned to the under-19 team, where he established himself as a regular starter, playing both in the Campionato Primavera 1 and the UEFA Youth League; in this last competition, he helped the team reach the semi-finals in the 2022–23 season, before reaching the final the following season. During his spell at AC Milan, he also trained with and received several call-ups to the first team, under manager Stefano Pioli. In June 2024, Nsiala announced his departure from AC Milan after turning down an offer to extend his expiring contract.

=== Rangers ===
On 10 June 2024, Scottish Premiership club Rangers announced that Nsiala had agreed to sign a pre-contract with the club, being set to join them on a free transfer on 1 July. He made his debut for Rangers B on 14 August 2024, starting on a 2024–25 Scottish Challenge Cup second round 3-2 away match against Clyde.

He scored his first goal for Rangers on 19 January 2025 against Fraserburgh in the Scottish Cup at Ibrox. During the 2024–25 season, Nsiala made 11 appearances for Rangers, recording one goal and one assist.

=== Sharjah ===
On 23 September 2026, Nsiala joined UAE Pro League club Sharjah on a two-year deal.

== International career ==
Nsiala represented France at youth international level, featuring for the under-16 national team in 2020.

== Style of play ==
Nsiala is a left-footed centre back, who has been mainly praised for his physicality, his anticipation skills, his jumping reach in aerial duels and his technique. He can also be deployed as a left-back and defensive midfielder.

== Personal life ==
Born in Rennes, Nsiala is of Congolese descent.

== Career statistics ==
As of match played 23 May 2026

Appearances and goals by club, season and competition
Club	Season	League			National cup (Note: Includes Scottish Cup)		League cup		Continental		Other		Total	
Club	Season	Division	Apps	Goals	Apps	Goals	Apps	Goals	Apps	Goals	Apps	Goals	Apps	Goals
AC Milan	2023–24	Serie A	0	0	0	0	—		0	0	—		0	0
Rangers B	2024–25	—			—		—		—		4 (Note: Appearances in Scottish Challenge Cup)	0	4	0
Rangers	2024–25	Scottish Premiership	11	0	1	1	0	0	1 (Note: Appearance in UEFA Europa League)	0	—		13	1
Rangers	2025–26	Scottish Premiership	3	0	1	0	0	0	0	0	—		4	0
Rangers	2026–27	Scottish Premiership	0	0	0	0	0	0	0	0	—		0	0
Rangers	Total		14	0	2	1	0	0	1	0	—		17	1
Westerlo (loan)	2025–26	Belgian Pro League	4	0	—		—		—		—		4	0
Career total			18	0	2	1	0	0	1	0	4	0	25	1
