= Mohamed Diomande =

Ivorian footballer (born 2001)

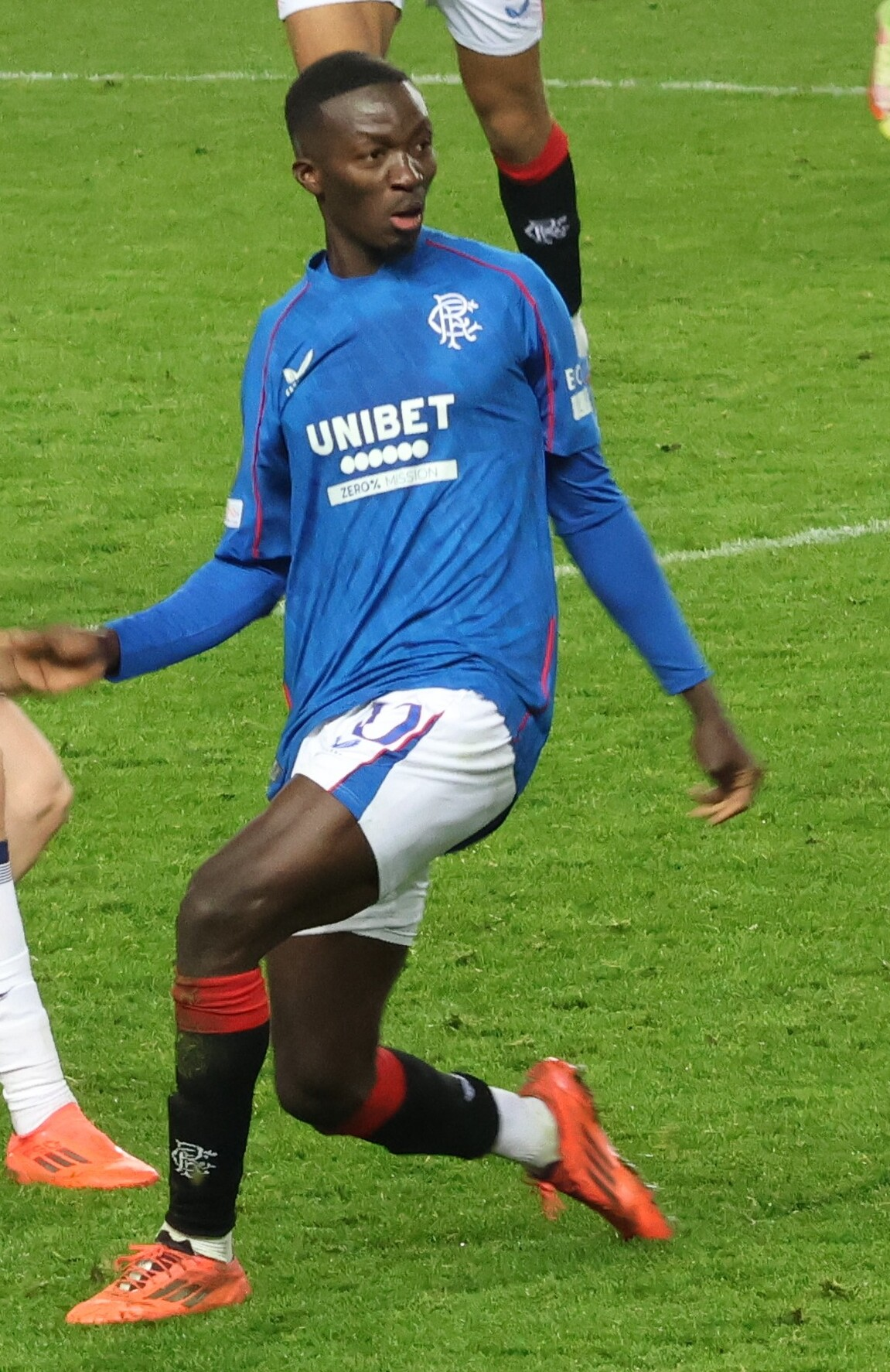
- Diomande in 2024

Personal information
- Full name: Mohamed Baba Diomande
- Date of birth: 30 October 2001 (age 25)
- Place of birth: Yopougon, Ivory Coast
- Height: 1.83 m (6 ft 0 in)
- Position: Midfielder

Team information
- Current team: Çorum
- Number: 10

Youth career
- 2013–2020: Right to Dream

Senior career*
Years	Team	Apps	(Gls)
2020–2024	Nordsjælland	96	(11)
2024–2026	Rangers	82	(7)
2026–	Çorum	3	(1)

International career^{‡}
2023–2024	Ivory Coast U23	1	(0)
2024–	Ivory Coast	8	(0)
- * Club domestic league appearances and goals as of 21:13, 31 August 2026 (UTC) ‡ National team caps and goals as of 11 June 2025

Mohamed Baba Diomande (born 30 October 2001) is an Ivorian professional footballer who plays as a midfielder for Turkish Süper Lig club Çorum and the Ivory Coast national team.

== Club career ==
=== Nordsjælland ===
Growing up in Wassakara in the Yopougon suburb of the Ivorian capital of Abidjan, Diomande came to the Danish club FC Nordsjælland through the Right to Dream Academy in Ghana. He made his professional debut on 19 February 2020 in a Danish Superliga match against AC Horsens, starting at central midfield in the 6–0 home win before being replaced in the 60th minute by Clinton Antwi. Diomande was subsequently praised by head coach Flemming Pedersen, who stated that "[h]e covers a large area of the pitch [...] he's a good dribbler and physically strong. When he adjusts to the Superliga, he will also become one of our most important players." He finished his first season as a senior player with 15 total appearances.

Diomande scored his first goal for Nordsjælland on 13 September 2020, the first matchday of the 2020–21 season, in a 3–2 loss to Brøndby IF.

=== Rangers ===
On 26 January 2024, Diomande joined Scottish Premiership side Rangers on a loan with an obligation to buy deal. He made his debut for Rangers on 6 February 2024, coming on as a 85th-minute substitute, replacing Todd Cantwell during a Scottish Premiership match at home to Aberdeen. He scored his first Rangers goal in a 3–0 victory away to St Johnstone on 18 February 2024.

On 15 December 2024, Diomande scored Rangers second goal in the 2024 Scottish League Cup final.

=== Çorum ===
On 12 August 2026, Diomande joined newly promoted Turkish Süper Lig club Çorum for a reported transfer fee of around £4.5m.

== International career ==
Born in the Ivory Coast, Diomande is of Ghanaian descent. He was called up to the Ivory Coast U23s in March 2023. He has since been called up to the Ghana National Team due to his early career.

Diomande made his debut for the Ivory Coast national team on 7 June 2024 in a World Cup qualifier against Gabon at the Amadou Gon Coulibaly Stadium. He substituted Jean Michaël Seri in the 78th minute of a 1–0 Ivory Coast victory.

== Career statistics ==
=== Club ===
As of match played 9 August 2026

Appearances and goals by club, season and competition
Club	Season	League			National cup (Note: Includes Danish Cup and Scottish Cup)		League cup (Note: Includes Scottish League Cup)		Continental		Total	
Club	Season	Division	Apps	Goals	Apps	Goals	Apps	Goals	Apps	Goals	Apps	Goals
Nordsjælland	2019–20	Danish Superliga	15	0	0	0	—		—		15	0
Nordsjælland	2020–21	Danish Superliga	11	3	2	0	—		—		13	3
Nordsjælland	2021–22	Danish Superliga	25	3	1	1	—		—		26	4
Nordsjælland	2022–23	Danish Superliga	32	5	4	3	—		—		36	8
Nordsjælland	2023–24	Danish Superliga	13	0	1	1	—		7 (Note: Appearances in UEFA Europa Conference League)	0	21	1
Nordsjælland	Total		96	11	8	5	—		7	0	111	16
Rangers	2023–24	Scottish Premiership	13	2	4	0	—		2 (Note: Appearances in UEFA Europa League)	0	19	2
Rangers	2024–25	Scottish Premiership	36	4	2	0	4	1	12 (Note: Two appearances in UEFA Champions League, ten appearances and one goal in UEFA Europa League)	1	54	6
Rangers	2025–26	Scottish Premiership	31	1	2	0	2	0	11 (Note: Six appearances in UEFA Champions League, four appearances and one goal in UEFA Europa League)	1	46	2
Rangers	2026–27	Scottish Premiership	2	0	0	0	0	0	1	0	3	0
Rangers	Total		82	7	8	0	6	1	26	2	122	10
Career total			178	18	16	5	6	1	33	2	233	26

=== International ===
As of match played 11 June 2025

Appearances and goals by national team and year
National team	Year	Apps	Goals
Ivory Coast	2024	4	0
Ivory Coast	2025	4	0
Total		8	0

== Honours ==
Individual

- Danish Superliga Team of the Month: July 2023
