= Danilo (footballer, born 1999) =

Brazilian footballer (born 1999)

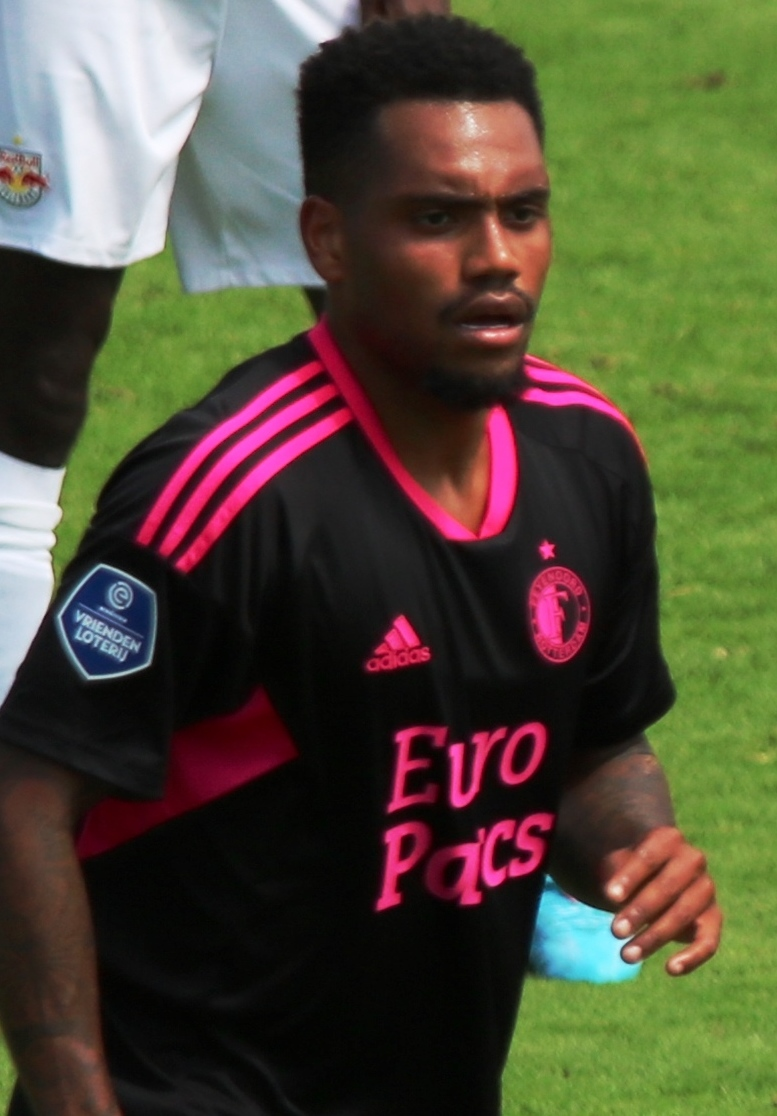
- Danilo playing for Feyenoord in 2022

Personal information
- Full name: Danilo Pereira da Silva
- Date of birth: 7 April 1999 (age 27)
- Place of birth: São Paulo, Brazil
- Height: 1.74 m (5 ft 9 in)
- Position: Centre-forward

Team information
- Current team: Botafogo (on loan from Rangers)
- Number: 90

Youth career
- São Caetano
- Portuguesa
- 2010–2014: Corinthians
- Ponte Preta
- Vasco da Gama
- Santos
- 2017–2018: Ajax

Senior career*
Years	Team	Apps	(Gls)
2018–2022	Jong Ajax	51	(31)
2020–2022	Ajax	14	(2)
2020–2021	→ Twente (loan)	33	(17)
2022–2023	Feyenoord	34	(10)
2023–	Rangers	49	(12)
2026	→ NEC Nijmegen (loan)	11	(1)
2026–	→ Botafogo (loan)	8	(1)

International career
2020	Brazil U23	1	(0)
- * Club domestic league appearances and goals as of 21 May 2026

Danilo Pereira da Silva (born 7 April 1999) is a Brazilian professional footballer who plays as a centre-forward for Campeonato Brasileiro Série A club Botafogo, on loan from Scottish Premiership club Rangers.

After playing youth football for several clubs in Brazil, Danilo joined Dutch club Ajax in 2017. He scored nine goals in 20 first-team appearances for Ajax, and had a loan spell at Twente. Danilo joined Feyenoord on a free transfer in 2022, winning the Eredivisie title in his only season at the club. Rangers signed him in July 2023.

Danilo played youth international football for Brazil at under-23 level.

== Club career ==
=== Youth career ===
Born in São Paulo, Danilo played youth football for São Caetano, Portuguesa, Corinthians, Ponte Preta and Vasco da Gama, before joining the academy of Santos. He scored seven goals and provided seven assists for the Santos under-20 team in the Paulista U-20 Championship in 2017.

=== Ajax ===
On 7 September 2017, Danilo signed for Dutch club Ajax after agreeing to a five-year deal. Ajax paid Santos a transfer fee of around €2 million. He was initially assigned to the Ajax under-19 team and the Jong Ajax squad (the club's reserve team).

On 25 March 2018, Danilo made his debut for Jong Ajax in a 1–0 defeat against Jong AZ. He scored his first goal for Jong Ajax on 10 September 2018, in a game in Alkmaar against Jong AZ.

He made his first-team debut for Ajax on 23 February 2020, as a substitute in an Eredivisie game against Heracles Almelo. Four days later, he scored on his first start for the club, in a UEFA Europa League match against Getafe. Danilo apologised to Ajax fans on social media after he was seen swapping shirts with Getafe player Deyverson at half-time.

On 14 August 2020, Danilo joined fellow Eredivisie side Twente on a season-long loan deal. He scored 17 goals in the 2020–21 Eredivisie season, which was the fourth-highest total in the league that season.

On 20 January 2022, he scored four goals for Ajax in a 9–0 win against Excelsior Maassluis in the round of 16 of the KNVB Cup.

=== Feyenoord ===
On 19 May 2022, Feyenoord announced that Danilo would sign a four-year contract with the club, joining on a free transfer. He made his debut for the club on 7 August 2022, scoring the club's second and fourth goals in a 5–2 away win against Vitesse. Feyenoord won the Eredivisie title in the 2022–23 season, with Danilo scoring 10 goals and providing three assists in 34 appearances in the league.

=== Rangers ===
==== 2023–24 ====
On 28 July 2023, Rangers announced that Danilo had joined the club and signed a five-year contract for an undisclosed transfer fee. He made his debut for the club in a 1–0 defeat away to Kilmarnock on 5 August 2023, as a 62nd minute substitute for Cyriel Dessers. He scored his first goal for Rangers during a league match at home to Livingston on 12 August 2023. Following this match Danilo scored against Greenock Morton in the Scottish League Cup.

On 16 September 2023, Danilo suffered a collision with a St Johnstone defender while scoring a goal and was taken to hospital with a suspected compound fracture in his skull. He scored what turned out to be winning goal against Hearts in the Scottish Premiership in October 2023 and followed this up with a goal in a five nil win over Dundee in November 2023. Danilo scored his first European goal for Rangers in a 2-1 win over Sparta Prague in the Europa League in November 2023. In a season curtailed through injury Danilo scored six goals in 21 appearances from all competitions.

==== 2024–25 ====
Danilo scored his first goal of the season against Ross County in a 6-0 win in August 2024. On 4 December 2024, Danilo scored Rangers second goal in a 6-0 win against Kilmarnock. Danilo followed this goal up with another strike in a 3-0 win over Ross County. On 15 December 2024, Danilo scored a late equaliser in the League Cup final to take the game to extra-time. Danilo turned provider for team mate Cerny to score the winning goal against Dundee in December 2024. Another goal came for Danilo in a league match against St Mirren in December 2024 with the assist coming from Niko Raskin. Danilo scored Rangers third goal in a 3-0 win over Celtic in January 2025, the assist for the goal came from team mate Jefte.

On 3 February 2026, NEC Nijmegen announced Danilo joined them on loan with an option to buy until the end of the season.

== International career ==
Danilo was called up to the Brazil under-23 team in November 2020, for friendly games against South Korea and Egypt. He made his debut, and only appearance at under-23 level, against South Korea on 14 November.

== Personal life ==
Danilo is a Christian and was baptised in a Scottish loch by a pastor from the Temple of Fire church in Brazil. Danilo is known to speak five languages including his native Portuguese and English.

== Career statistics ==
As of match played 17 May 2026

Appearances and goals by club, season and competition
Club	Season	League			National cup (Note: Includes KNVB Cup)		League cup (Note: Includes Scottish League Cup)		Europe		Other		Total	
Club	Season	Division	Apps	Goals	Apps	Goals	Apps	Goals	Apps	Goals	Apps	Goals	Apps	Goals
Jong Ajax	2017–18	Eerste Divisie	1	0	—		—		—		—		1	0
Jong Ajax	2018–19	Eerste Divisie	33	19	—		—		—		—		33	19
Jong Ajax	2019–20	Eerste Divisie	8	5	—		—		—		—		8	5
Jong Ajax	2021–22	Eerste Divisie	9	7	—		—		—		—		9	7
Jong Ajax	Total		51	31	—		—		—		—		51	31
Ajax	2019–20	Eredivisie	1	0	1	0	—		1 (Note: Appearance(s) in UEFA Europa League)	1	0	0	3	1
Ajax	2021–22	Eredivisie	13	2	3	6	—		0	0	1 (Note: Appearance in Johan Cruyff Shield)	0	17	8
Ajax	Total		14	2	4	6	—		1	1	1	0	20	9
Twente (loan)	2020–21	Eredivisie	33	17	1	0	—		—		—		34	17
Feyenoord	2022–23	Eredivisie	34	10	4	2	—		10	2	—		48	14
Rangers	2023–24	Scottish Premiership	12	4	0	0	2	1	7 (Note: Four appearances in UEFA Champions League, three appearances and one goal in UEFA Europa League)	1	—		21	6
Rangers	2024–25	Scottish Premiership	23	5	0	0	3	1	1 (Note: Appearance in UEFA Europa League)	0	—		27	6
Rangers	2025–26	Scottish Premiership	5	2	0	0	1	0	8 (Note: Six appearances and one goal in UEFA Champions League, two appearances in UEFA Europa League)	1	—		28	4
Rangers	Total		40	11	0	0	6	2	16	2	—		76	16
Rangers B	2024–25	—	—		—		—		—		1 (Note: Appearance in Scottish Challenge Cup)	1	1	1
NEC (loan)	2025–26	Eredivisie	11	1	1	0	—		—		—		12	1
Career total			183	72	10	8	6	2	27	5	2	1	242	89

== Honours ==
Jong Ajax

- Eerste Divisie: 2017–18

Ajax

- Eredivisie: 2021–22

Feyenoord

- Eredivisie: 2022–23

Rangers

- Scottish League Cup: 2023–24

Individual

- Eredivisie Talent of the Month: October 2020
