= Bailey Rice (Scottish footballer) =

Scottish footballer (born 2006)

Personal information
- Full name: Bailey Joe Rice
- Date of birth: 4 October 2006 (age 20)
- Place of birth: Scotland
- Position: Defensive midfielder

Team information
- Current team: Kilmarnock (on loan from Rangers)
- Number: 49

Youth career
- 2020–2022: Motherwell
- 2022–: Rangers

Senior career*
Years	Team	Apps	(Gls)
2023–	Rangers	10	(0)
2026–	→ Kilmarnock (loan)	6	(0)

International career^{‡}
2021	Scotland U16	5	(0)
2021–2023	Scotland U17	14	(1)
2023–	Scotland U19	11	(0)
2025–	Scotland U21	2	(0)
- * Club domestic league appearances and goals as of 21:05, 19 September 2026 (UTC) ‡ National team caps and goals as of 25 March 2025

Bailey Joe Rice (born 4 October 2006) is a Scottish professional footballer who plays as a midfielder for Scottish Premiership club Kilmarnock, on loan from Rangers.

== Club career ==
A product of the Motherwell youth academy and part of the Scottish Football Association (SFA) Performance School Programme via Braidhurst High School, Rice signed for Rangers on 30 June 2022 after rejecting a professional contract with the Steelmen. He made his senior debut for Rangers in February 2023 in a Scottish Premiership match away to Livingston as an 88th-minute substitute for Ryan Kent, becoming the youngest post-war league player for the club, aged 16 years and 137 days, and the second youngest post-war player in all competitions, after Derek Ferguson. In September of that year he signed a contract extension running to 2026.

Rice made his UEFA Europa League debut on 28 November 2024, replacing Nedim Bajrami in the 80th minute of a 4–1 away win over OGC Nice. On 10 April 2025, he was selected to start in the competition's quarter-final first leg against Athletic Bilbao, but had to be carried off on a stretcher with an hour played after suffering a head injury. He made only 12 appearances overall during the campaign, with his progress compared unfavourably with that of former Motherwell youth teammate Lennon Miller, while Rice indicated his hope for more first-team opportunities in the season ahead.

== International career ==
Rice has represented Scotland at youth levels, playing 14 matches for the under-17 team. His debut for Rangers came less than 24 hours after playing for Scotland under-17s in Spain against Switzerland. He received a first call-up for the under-21 squad in March 2025.

== Career statistics ==
As of match played 22:12, 17 May 2025 (UTC)

Appearances and goals by club, season and competition
Club	Season	League			National cup		League cup		Europe		Other		Total	
Club	Season	Division	Apps	Goals	Apps	Goals	Apps	Goals	Apps	Goals	Apps	Goals	Apps	Goals
Rangers	2022–23	Scottish Premiership	1	0	0	0	0	0	0	0	—		1	0
Rangers	2023–24	Scottish Premiership	2	0	0	0	0	0	0	0	—		2	0
Rangers	2024–25	Scottish Premiership	7	0	2	0	0	0	3 (Note: Appearance in UEFA Europa League)	0	—		12	0
Rangers	Total		10	0	2	0	0	0	3	0	—		15	0
Rangers B	2022–23	—			—		—		—		1 (Note: Appearances in Scottish Challenge Cup)	0	1	0
Rangers B	2023–24	—			—		—		—		3	0	3	0
Rangers B	2024–25	—			—		—		—		4	0	4	0
Career total			10	0	2	0	0	0	3	0	8	0	23	0
