= Ross McCausland =

Northern Irish footballer (born 2003)

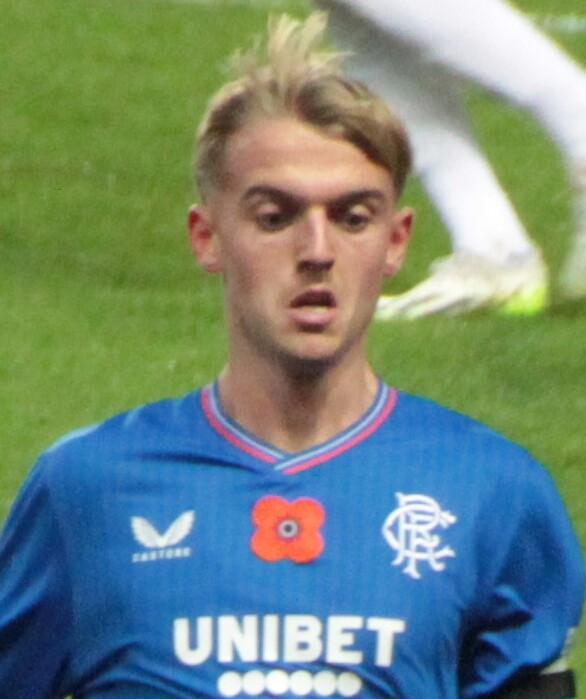
- McCausland playing for Rangers in 2023

Personal information
- Date of birth: 12 May 2003 (age 23)
- Place of birth: Antrim, Northern Ireland
- Height: 1.70 m (5 ft 7 in)
- Positions: Forward; right midfielder

Team information
- Current team: Rangers
- Number: 45

Youth career
- 2018: County Antrim
- 2018–2019: Linfield
- 2019–2023: Rangers

Senior career*
Years	Team	Apps	(Gls)
2022–	Rangers	44	(3)
2025–2026	→ Aris Limassol (loan)	22	(4)

International career^{‡}
2018	Northern Ireland U16	2	(0)
2018–2019	Northern Ireland U17	7	(2)
2021	Northern Ireland U19	4	(0)
2022–2023	Northern Ireland U21	3	(0)
2023–	Northern Ireland	5	(0)
- * Club domestic league appearances and goals as of 11:21, 26 May 2026 (UTC) ‡ National team caps and goals as of 10 September 2024

Ross McCausland (born 12 May 2003) is a Northern Irish professional footballer who plays for Scottish Premiership club Rangers and the Northern Ireland national team.

== Club career ==
=== Rangers ===
McCausland joined the Rangers Academy from Northern Irish side Linfield in the summer of 2019 for £60,000. In 2021, he signed a contract extension with the club running until 2024.

Having been selected regularly for the club's B-team in the 2021–22 season (featuring in the UEFA Youth League as well as the Lowland League and Challenge Cup), McCausland made his first team debut for Rangers on 14 May 2022, replacing Amad as a 61st-minute substitute during a 3–1 win over Heart of Midlothian; he set up fellow debutant Cole McKinnon for his first goal. He continued to be a B-team player during the 2022–23 season and made only one senior appearance, being used as a late substitute by manager Michael Beale in a league match away to Hibernian on 21 May 2023.

After the sacking of Beale during the 2023–24 season, McCausland started to get a run of games under interim manager Steven Davis and then the new permanent manager Philippe Clement. On 5 October 2023, he made his first appearance against Cypriot side Aris Limassol in the UEFA Europa League, coming on as an 84th minute substitute for Scott Wright.

McCausland impressed supporters with his performance off the bench against Hearts in October 2023; he was denied a first Rangers goal in a victory over Livingston in a Scottish Premiership fixture, with the strike ruled out for a foul by Abdallah Sima in the build-up.

McCausland signed a new four-year contract with Rangers on 28 November 2023 and was promoted to the first-team squad permanently. Two days later he celebrated with a first goal for the club against Aris Limassol, after coming in as a first half substitute for Todd Cantwell. On 17 December, McCausland started in the Scottish League Cup final against Aberdeen, and won his first trophy when Rangers captain James Tavernier scored the only goal of the match.

McCausland scored his first Premiership goal against Kilmarnock on 2 January 2024, but a run of starting appearances ended when he was injured by a tackle from Motherwell defender Dan Casey on 2 March, causing him to miss several fixtures; when he returned to fitness he was again among the substitutes. He was nominated for the PFA Scotland Young Player of the Year award, but lost out to David Watson of Kilmarnock.

McCausland scored his first goal of the season 2024-25 against St Johnstone in the Scottish League Cup, with the assist coming from teammate Cyriel Dessers.

=== Aris Limassol ===
On 1 August 2025, McCausland joined Aris Limassol on a season long loan which included a conditional obligation to buy at the end of the loan deal.

== International career ==
McCausland played regularly for Northern Ireland as a youth internationalist. On 14 November 2023, he received his first call-up to the Northern Ireland senior team for a round of UEFA Euro 2024 qualifying matches. Three days later he made his debut against Finland, starting in a 4–0 defeat.

== Career statistics ==
As of match played 16 August 2026 (UTC)

Appearances and goals by club, season and competition
Club	Season	League			National cup (Note: Includes Scottish Cup, Cypriot Cup)		League cup (Note: Includes Scottish League Cup)		Europe		Other		Total	
Club	Season	Division	Apps	Goals	Apps	Goals	Apps	Goals	Apps	Goals	Apps	Goals	Apps	Goals
Rangers B	2019–20	—	—		—		—		—		1 (Note: Appearance(s) in Scottish Challenge Cup)	0	1	0
Rangers B	2021–22	—	—		—		—		—		3	0	3	0
Rangers B	2022–23	—	—		—		—		—		3	0	3	0
Rangers B	2023–24	—	—		—		—		—		3	1	3	1
Rangers B	Total		—		—		—		—		10	1	10	1
Rangers	2021–22	Scottish Premiership	1	0	0	0	0	0	0	0	—		1	0
Rangers	2022–23	Scottish Premiership	1	0	0	0	0	0	0	0	—		1	0
Rangers	2023–24	Scottish Premiership	29	3	4	0	1	0	5 (Note: Appearances in UEFA Europa League)	1	—		39	4
Rangers	2024–25	Scottish Premiership	13	0	1	1	2	1	9 (Note: Two appearances in UEFA Champions League, seven appearances and one goal in UEFA Europa League)	1	—		25	3
Rangers	2026–27	Scottish Premiership	0	0	0	0	1	1	0	0	—		1	1
Rangers	Total		44	3	5	1	4	2	14	2	—		67	8
Aris Limassol (loan)	2025–26	Cypriot First Division	22	4	2	0	—		2 (Note: Appearances in UEFA Conference League)	0	—		26	4
Career total			66	7	7	1	4	2	16	2	10	1	103	13

== Honours ==
Rangers

- Scottish League Cup: 2023–24
