= Leon Balogun =

German-born Nigerian footballer (born 1988)

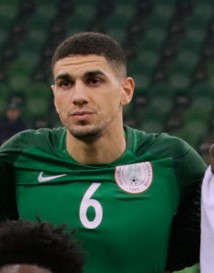
- Balogun playing for Nigeria in 2017

Personal information
- Full name: Leon Aderemi Balogun
- Date of birth: 28 June 1988 (age 38)
- Place of birth: Berlin, West Germany
- Height: 1.90 m (6 ft 3 in)
- Positions: Centre-back; right-back

Team information
- Current team: ETO Győr
- Number: 27

Youth career
- Hertha BSC
- –2007: Hertha Zehlendorf

Senior career*
Years	Team	Apps	(Gls)
2007–2008	Türkiyemspor Berlin	29	(4)
2008–2010	Hannover 96 II	37	(1)
2008–2010	Hannover 96	3	(0)
2010–2012	Werder Bremen II	49	(4)
2010–2012	Werder Bremen	3	(0)
2012–2014	Fortuna Düsseldorf	28	(0)
2012–2014	Fortuna Düsseldorf II	4	(1)
2014–2015	Darmstadt 98	21	(4)
2015–2018	Mainz 05	52	(1)
2017	Mainz 05 II	1	(0)
2018–2020	Brighton & Hove Albion	8	(1)
2020	→ Wigan Athletic (loan)	6	(0)
2020	Wigan Athletic	5	(0)
2020–2022	Rangers	40	(1)
2022–2023	Queens Park Rangers	16	(1)
2023–2025	Rangers	34	(1)
2025–2026	Aris Limassol	22	(2)
2026–	ETO Győr	0	(0)

International career^{‡}
2014–2022	Nigeria	46	(1)
Medal record
Representing Nigeria
Africa Cup of Nations
Third place	2019 Egypt
- * Club domestic league appearances and goals as of 6 August 2026 ‡ National team caps and goals as of 19:11, 13 June 2022 (UTC)

Leon Aderemi Balogun (born 28 June 1988) is a German-born Nigerian professional footballer who plays as a centre-back or right-back for Nemzeti Bajnokság I club ETO Győr.

== Club career ==
=== Early career ===
He made his Bundesliga debut on 19 April 2009 for Hannover 96 in a game against Hamburger SV.

After his contract with 2. Bundesliga side Fortuna Düsseldorf expired in summer 2014, he was without a club for three months until he joined fellow leaguer Darmstadt 98. He signed a contract until the end of the 2014–15 season.

=== Brighton & Hove Albion ===
On 22 May 2018, Balogun signed a two-year deal with Premier League club Brighton & Hove Albion.

Balogun made his competitive debut for the Sussex club coming on as an early substitute against Manchester United replacing injured Lewis Dunk. The Seagulls went on to beat United 3–2 at Falmer Stadium.

He scored his first goal for the Albion to make it 2–0 against bitter rivals Crystal Palace at Falmer Stadium where he scored in 25 seconds after being subbed on replacing Pascal Groß as a result of a Shane Duffy red card for head butting. The game finished 3–1 to the Albion to claim the boasting rights in the M23 derby.

On 27 August 2019, Balogun played in his first ever EFL Cup match in a 2–1 away win over Bristol Rovers.

=== Wigan Athletic ===
Balogun signed for Wigan Athletic on 31 January 2020 on a six-month loan deal. On 25 June 2020, he signed a short term permanent contract with the Latics until the end of the 2019–20 season.

=== Rangers ===
Balogun signed for Scottish Premiership club Rangers on 24 July 2020 on a one-year contract, with an option in the club's favour to extend for a further year. He made his debut for Rangers a week later, on 1 August, in a Scottish Premiership match against Aberdeen where he impressed during a 1–0 win. During February 2021, he deputised at right back after an injury to club captain James Tavernier and the suspension of reserve player Nathan Patterson. Balogun previously played at right back earlier in his career when in Germany.

On 9 April 2021, Balogun signed a new one-year contract with Rangers. He scored his first goal for the club on 27 October 2021, in a Europa League group stage match against Brøndby IF. Balogun left Rangers in June 2022 after his contract expired, with his final appearance coming in their 2022 Scottish Cup Final victory. Rangers legend Ally McCoist commented two months later that he had been "surprised" by Balogun's departure, and suggested that the club should re-sign him.

=== Queens Park Rangers ===
Balogun signed a one-year contract with Queens Park Rangers on 26 August 2022. He scored his first goal for the club on 22 October 2022, which proved to be the winner, against his former club Wigan Athletic.

=== Return to Rangers ===
He returned to Rangers on 12 July 2023, a year after departing from the club as a free agent. His return was one celebrated by the club and its fans, as well as Balogun himself, who felt as though he had “come home”.

=== Aris Limassol ===
On 20 June 2025, Balogun signed a one-year contract with Cypriot First Division club Aris Limassol.

=== ETO Győr ===
On 6 August 2026, Balogun signed a contract with Hungarian club ETO Győr.

== International career ==
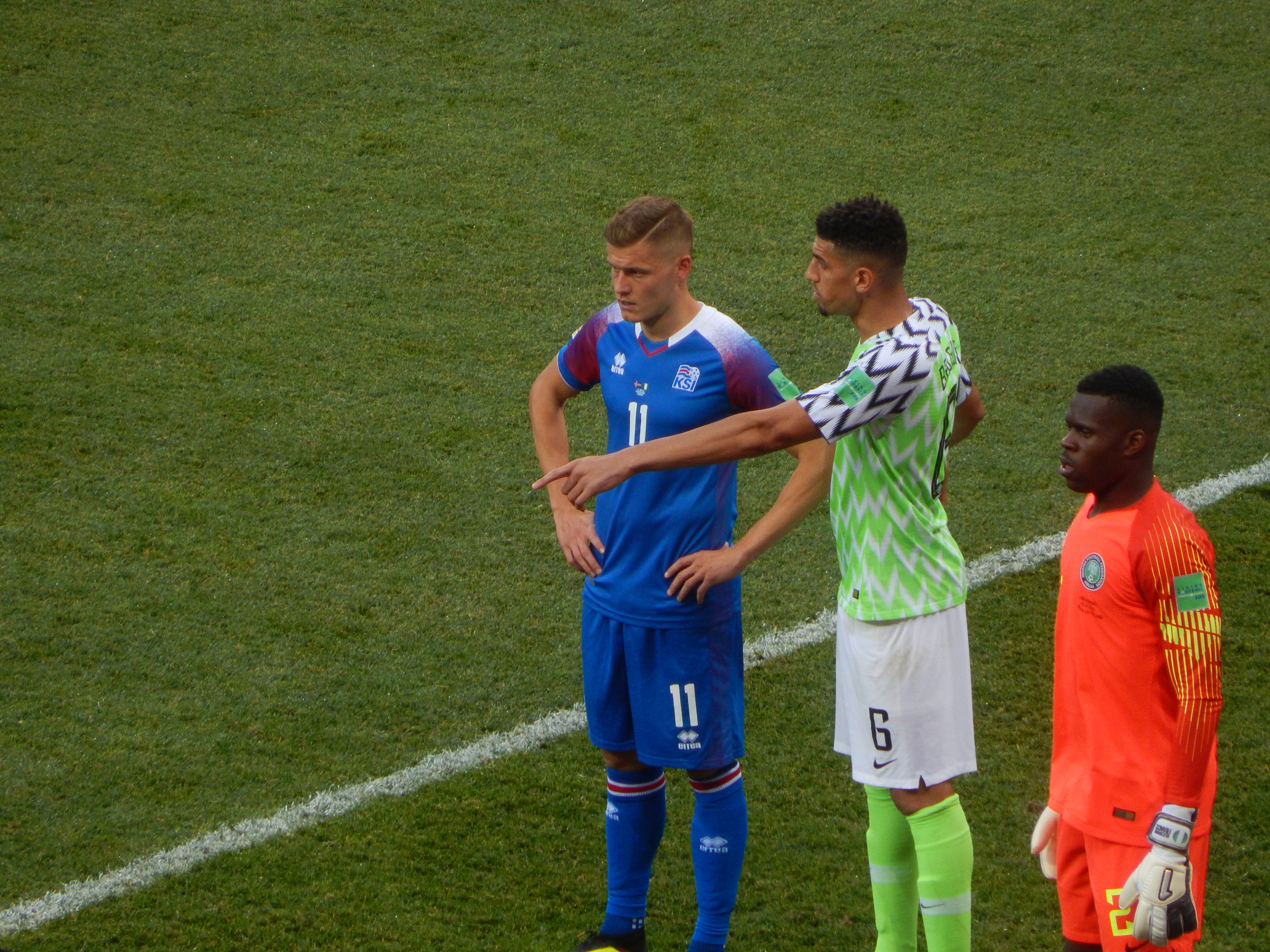
Balogun with Nigeria against Iceland at the 2018 FIFA World Cup

Born to a Nigerian father and German mother, Balogun was called up by Nigeria for a March 2014 friendly against Mexico as a replacement for Joseph Yobo. Balogun entered at half-time, but was injured after 20 minutes in a collision with signage on the touchline. He fractured his foot and was set to miss 2–3 months after surgery. However, he later confirmed to news media that his injury did not require surgery.

On 25 March 2015, he played his second game for Nigeria in a 1–0 loss against Uganda. He played his third game for the country on 13 June 2015 when he featured in a 2–0 win over Chad in the opening game of qualifying for the 2017 African Nations Cup.

In June 2018, he was named in Nigeria's final 23-man squad for the 2018 FIFA World Cup in Russia. Balogun played in every minute of the three games Nigeria played in, including a 2–0 win over Iceland, but were eliminated after finishing 3rd in their group.

Balogun was included in Nigeria's squad for the 2019 Africa Cup of Nations. His first appearance in the competition came in Nigeria's second group game against Guinea in which Nigeria won 1–0 to seal qualification into the knockouts. Balogun made four appearances in the competition where The Super Eagles finished as bronze medallists.

== Personal life ==
Balogun was born in Berlin, West Germany to a Nigerian-Yoruba father and a German mother. Balogun was raised Roman Catholic and attended a Catholic primary school, but was not religious as a child. However, during the hardships of his early footballing career he became more devout. Balogun speaks fluent English and German, but does not speak Yoruba, as his parents tried to assimilate him into German culture.

In November 2019, Balogun said there needed to be a collective response from players to racism in football.

== Career statistics ==
=== Club ===
As of match played 7 August 2025

Appearances and goals by club, season and competition
Club	Season	League			National cup (Note: Includes DFB-Pokal, FA Cup, Scottish Cup)		League cup (Note: Includes EFL Cup, Scottish League Cup)		Europe		Total	
Club	Season	Division	Apps	Goals	Apps	Goals	Apps	Goals	Apps	Goals	Apps	Goals
Hannover 96 II	2008–09	Regionalliga Nord	21	1	—		—		—		21	1
Hannover 96 II	2009–10	Regionalliga Nord	16	0	—		—		—		16	0
Hannover 96 II	Total		37	1	—		—		—		37	1
Hannover 96	2008–09	Bundesliga	1	0	0	0	—		—		1	0
Hannover 96	2009–10	Bundesliga	2	0	0	0	—		—		2	0
Hannover 96	Total		3	0	0	0	—		—		3	0
Werder Bremen II	2010–11	3. Liga	29	1	—		—		—		29	1
Werder Bremen II	2011–12	3. Liga	20	3	—		—		—		20	3
Werder Bremen II	Total		49	4	—		—		—		49	4
Werder Bremen	2010–11	Bundesliga	3	0	0	0	—		0	0	3	0
Werder Bremen	2011–12	Bundesliga	0	0	0	0	—		—		0	0
Werder Bremen	Total		3	0	0	0	—		0	0	3	0
Fortuna Düsseldorf II	2012–13	Regionalliga West	2	1	—		—		—		2	1
Fortuna Düsseldorf II	2013–14	Regionalliga West	2	0	—		—		—		2	0
Fortuna Düsseldorf II	Total		4	1	—		—		—		4	1
Fortuna Düsseldorf	2012–13	Bundesliga	17	0	1	0	—		—		18	0
Fortuna Düsseldorf	2013–14	2. Bundesliga	11	0	1	0	—		—		12	0
Fortuna Düsseldorf	Total		28	0	2	0	—		—		30	0
Darmstadt 98	2014–15	2. Bundesliga	21	4	0	0	—		—		21	4
Mainz 05	2015–16	Bundesliga	21	1	2	0	—		—		23	1
Mainz 05	2016–17	Bundesliga	17	0	1	0	—		2 (Note: Appearances in UEFA Europa League)	0	20	0
Mainz 05	2017–18	Bundesliga	14	0	1	0	—		—		15	0
Mainz 05	Total		52	1	4	0	—		2	0	58	1
Mainz 05 II	2016–17	3. Liga	1	0	—		—		—		1	0
Brighton & Hove Albion	2018–19	Premier League	8	1	2	0	0	0	—		10	1
Brighton & Hove Albion	2019–20	Premier League	0	0	0	0	1	0	—		1	0
Brighton & Hove Albion	Total		8	1	2	0	1	0	—		11	1
Wigan Athletic (loan)	2019–20	Championship	6	0	0	0	0	0	—		6	0
Wigan Athletic	2019–20	Championship	5	0	0	0	0	0	—		5	0
Rangers	2020–21	Scottish Premiership	19	0	0	0	1	0	8	0	28	0
Rangers	2021–22	Scottish Premiership	21	0	3	0	2	0	11 (Note: One appearance in UEFA Champions League, ten appearances and two goals in UEFA Europa League)	2	37	2
Rangers	Total		40	0	3	0	3	0	19	2	65	2
Queens Park Rangers	2022–23	Championship	16	1	0	0	0	0	—		16	1
Rangers	2023–24	Scottish Premiership	14	0	2	0	3	0	0	0	19	0
Rangers	2024–25	Scottish Premiership	20	1	0	0	2	0	8 (Note: One appearance in UEFA Champions League, seven appearances in UEFA Europa League)	0	30	1
Rangers	Total		34	1	2	0	5	0	8	0	49	1
Aris Limassol	2025–26	Cypriot First Division	0	0	0	0	—		3 (Note: Appearances in UEFA Conference League)	0	3	0
ETO Győr	2026–27	Nemzeti Bajnokság I	0	0	0	0	—		0 (Note: Appearances in UEFA Conference League)	0	0	0
Career total			307	14	13	0	9	0	32	2	361	15

=== International ===
As of match played 13 June 2022

Appearances and goals by national team and year
National team	Year	Apps	Goals
Nigeria	2014	1	0
Nigeria	2015	5	0
Nigeria	2016	3	0
Nigeria	2017	6	0
Nigeria	2018	11	0
Nigeria	2019	6	0
Nigeria	2020	4	0
Nigeria	2021	7	1
Nigeria	2022	3	0
Total		46	1

Scores and results list Nigeria's goal tally first, score column indicates score after each Balogun goal.

List of international goals scored by Leon Balogun
No.	Date	Venue	Opponent	Score	Result	Competition
1	10 October 2021	Japoma Stadium, Douala, Cameroon	Central African Republic	1–0	2–0	2022 FIFA World Cup qualification

== Honours ==
Rangers

- Scottish Premiership: 2020–21
- Scottish Cup: 2021–22
- Scottish League Cup: 2023–24
- UEFA Europa League runner-up: 2021–22

Nigeria

- Africa Cup of Nations third place: 2019
