= Hamza Igamane =

Moroccan footballer (born 2002)

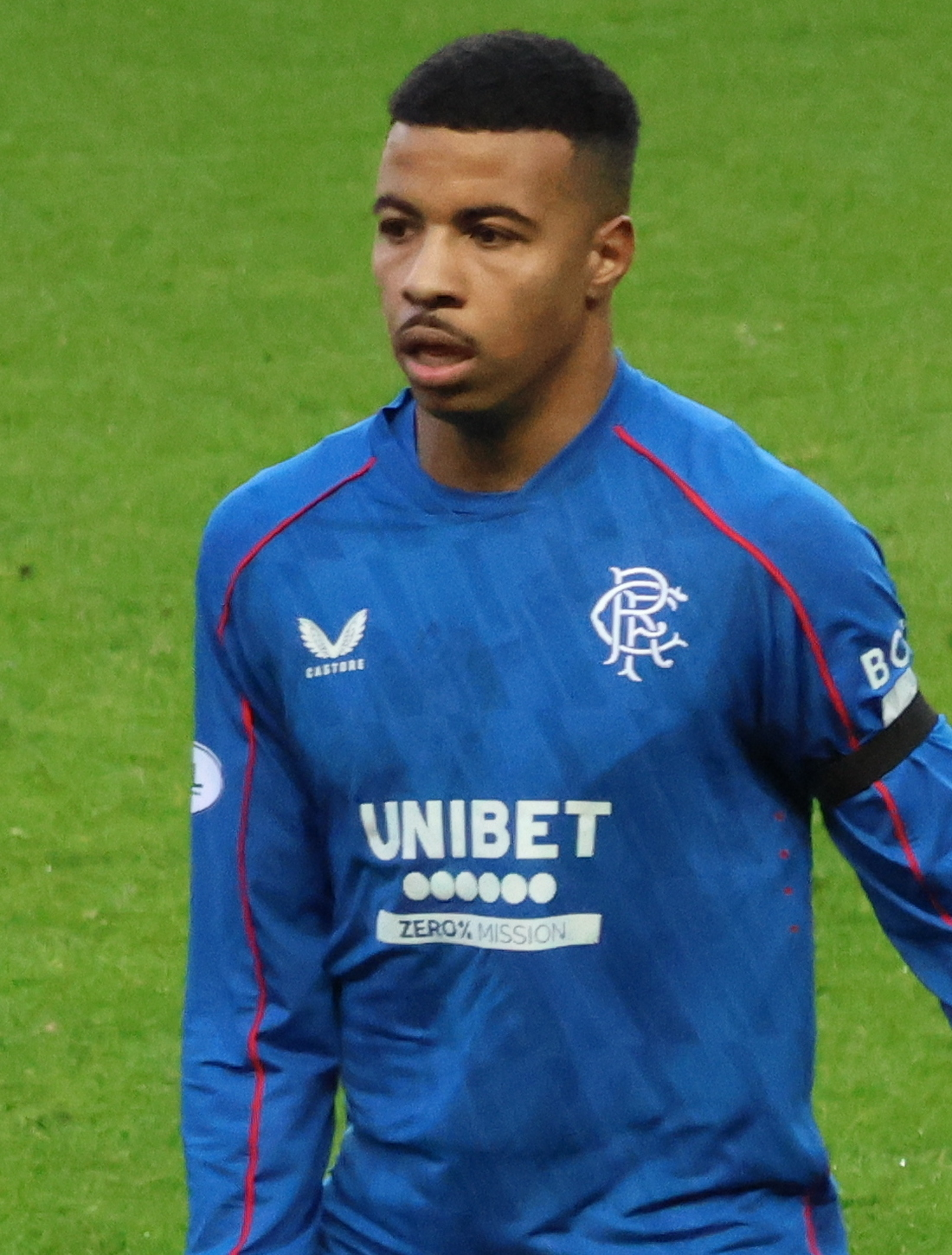
- Igamane with Rangers in 2024

Personal information
- Full name: Hamza Igamane
- Date of birth: 2 November 2002 (age 24)
- Place of birth: Temara, Morocco
- Height: 1.81 m (5 ft 11 in)
- Position: Striker

Team information
- Current team: Lille
- Number: 29

Youth career
- AS FAR

Senior career*
| Years | Team | Apps | (Gls) |
| 2020–2024 | AS FAR | 45 | (13) |
| 2024–2025 | Rangers | 33 | (12) |
| 2025– | Lille | 13 | (5) |

International career^{‡}
| 2023–2024 | Morocco U23 | 8 | (2) |
| 2025– | Morocco | 10 | (2) |
Medal record
Men's football
Representing Morocco
Africa Cup of Nations
| Winner | 2025 Morocco |
U-23 Africa Cup of Nations
| Winner | 2023 Morocco |
- * Club domestic league appearances and goals as of 23:05, 5 December 2025 (UTC) ‡ National team caps and goals as of 23:57, 18 January 2026 (UTC)

Hamza Igamane (Arabic: حمزة إكمان, Berber languages: ⵃⴰⵎⵣⴰ ⵉⴳⴰⵎⴰⵏ; born 2 November 2002) is a Moroccan professional footballer who plays as a striker for Ligue 1 club Lille and the Morocco national team.

== Club career ==
=== AS FAR ===
Hamza Igamane was born on 2 November 2002 in Témara in Morocco and grew up in the Massira 2 district in a family of footballers, and joined the ASFAR Football Academy from an early age.

During the 2022–23 season, Igamane established himself as a key element of the club's squad and produced remarkable performances during the Confederation Cup. AS FAR and Igamane were eliminated in the quarter-finals after a cumulative score (return match) of 4–3 in favor of USM Alger, winners of this edition.

On 23 June 2023, on the last day of the championship, he won the Moroccan championship after a 2–3 victory against IR Tangier away and ahead of Wydad AC who finished runners-up. He ends the 2023–2024 season as vice-champion of Morocco.

=== Rangers ===
On 5 July 2024, Igamane signed a five-year deal with Scottish Premiership side Rangers for an undisclosed fee. Which was widely reported to be around £1.7 million plus add-ons. He sustained an injury during the summer which ruled him out of the squad for the first couple of months of the season before making his debut on 1 September 2024 in a 3–0 away defeat to Rangers rivals Celtic coming on as an 80th-minute substitute for Václav Černý. He scored his first goal for Rangers during a 4–0 victory against FC Steaua București at Ibrox on 24 October 2024 in the UEFA Europa League group stage.

Igamane would mostly be used as a substitute during the beginning of his Rangers career but on 28 November 2024, he found himself in the starting line-up against OGC Nice again in the UEFA Europa League group stage where he scored a brace and got an assist during a 4–1 victory at the Allianz Riviera. On 4 December 2024, Igamane scored his first Scottish Premiership goal for Rangers, a powerful strike outside the box which flew into the bottom left corner during a 6–0 victory over Kilmarnock at Ibrox. He followed this up over the next week with goals in both a 3–0 victory over Ross County and a 1–1 draw with Tottenham Hotspur to take his tally to five goals in five games and four goals in his first four Europa League matches. On 29 December 2024, Rangers found themselves 2–0 down in a league match against Motherwell. Igamane came on as a second-half substitute and scored a brace to level the match and rescue a point for Rangers.

On 5 January 2025, Igamane scored his first career hat-trick (which was also a perfect hat-trick, having scored with both his feet and his head) against Hibernian in a 3–3 draw at Easter Road. On 12 January 2025, he scored in a 3–1 victory against St Johnstone. Three days later he scored his seventh goal in six games during a 3–0 victory over Rangers rivals Aberdeen. For his performances over the month Igamane received his first ever Scottish Premiership Player of the Month award. On 16 March 2025, Igamane scored his first Old Firm goal, an 88th-minute winner as Rangers defeated Celtic 3–2 at Celtic Park for the first time since 2020. On 13 April, he scored the first goal as 10–man Rangers came from 2–0 down to draw 2–2 with Aberdeen at Pitodrie in the Scottish Premiership. On 27 April 2025, Igamane was awarded the Young Player of the Year and Goal of the Season awards for his goal against Celtic earlier in the month at Rangers Player Awards Ceremony for 2025. On 11 May 2025, he scored a volley from 25 yards during a 4–0 victory over Aberdeen at Ibrox which meant he had scored in his last three appearances against The Dons.

=== Lille ===
On 29 August 2025, Igamane signed a five-year deal with Ligue 1 side Lille for an undisclosed fee; which was widely reported to be worth £10.4 million. Igamane made his debut a day later coming on as a second-half substitute for Marius Broholm in a league match against FC Lorient and scored a brace during a 7–1 victory. Igamane would get off to a great start at Lille scoring nine goals in his first eighteen games including four goals in five Europa League appearances before suffering a serious anterior cruciate ligament (ACL) tear in his right knee whilst on international duty during the 2025 Africa Cup of Nations final on against Senegal in Rabat which would prematurely end his season. Despite this on 8 November 2026, Lille decided to extend Igamane’s contract until June 2031 as he entered the final stages of his recovery.

== International career ==
=== Youth ===
Appearing on Walid Regragui's pre-selected list in March 2023 for friendly matches against Brazil and Peru, he was not included in the final list. During the press conference for this international break, Regragui said about Igamane: "Igamane is progressing. We follow him closely. When the time is right, he will be called up to the first team . For the moment, he is with the U23s . His time will come".

On 22 March 2023, he joined the Morocco under-23 team under then coach Issame Charaï for a friendly match against Olympic Ivory Coast in Rabat as part of their preparations for the U-23 Africa Cup of Nations which took place in Morocco later that year. During this match, he started the game but the team conceded three goals and lost 3–2. Two days later, he appeared on the bench during a new friendly match against Olympic Togo, however he did not feature in the game which Morocco won 2–0.

On 9 June 2023, he appeared on Charaï's final list to take part in the CAN U23 which took place in Morocco. The group stage matches take place at the end of June against Olympic Guinea, Olympic Ghana and Olympic DR Congo at the Prince Moulay Abdellah Stadium in Rabat. On 24 June 2023, during the first match against Olympic Guinea, he was put on the bench for 90 minutes despite a Moroccan victory (victory, 2–1). Established during the first match against Olympic Guinea (victory, 2–1), he was put on the bench for the second time in a row during the second day of the U23 CAN against Olympic Ghana and nevertheless validated his ticket for the semi-finals of the competition after a 5–1 victory . On 30 June, he played his first match of the competition against the Olympic Congo, coming on in the 46th minute in place of Couhaib Driouech (victory, 1–0). The final was won by Morocco in overtime against Egypt thanks to a goal from Oussama Targhalline (victory, 2–1).

=== Senior ===
On 9 March 2025, Igamane received his first call up to the Moroccan senior national team for their 2026 World Cup qualifying matches against Niger and Tanzania. He made his international debut on 21 March 2025, coming on as an 82nd-minute substitute during a 2–1 away victory over Niger. On 5 September 2025, Igamane scored his first goal for Morocco in the return qualifying leg against Niger with Morocco winning the match 5–0 at home and securing top spot in their CAF Qualification group and thus earning a place at the 2026 Fifa World Cup. Three days later he started his first game for Morocco in a World Cup qualifier against Zambia at the Levy Mwanawasa Stadium and scored the second goal in a 2–0 victory.

On 11 December 2025, Igamane was called up to the Morocco squad for the 2025 Africa Cup of Nations. On 9 January 2026, he made his Africa Cup of Nations debut coming on as a substitute in a 2–0 victory over Cameroon in the quarter-final. On 14 January 2026, Igamane missed a penalty during a penalty shoot-out in the semi-final against Nigeria although Morocoo would go on to win the shoot-out 4–2. On 18 January 2026, he sustained an ACL injury during the AFCON final against Senegal, which would sideline him for several months. Morocco would go on to lose the match 1–0 and finish runners-up. On 17 March 2026, the result was officially overturned to a 3–0 victory to Morocco after it was decided that Senegal had forfeited the match when they walked off the park in protest of a penalty decision that happened during the game upgrading Morocco to champions and handing them their first title since 1976.

== Career statistics ==
=== Club ===
As of match played 5 December 2025

Appearances and goals by club, season and competition
| Club | Season | League | | | National cup (Note: Includes Moroccan Throne Cup, Scottish Cup) | | League cup (Note: Includes Scottish League Cup) | | Continental | | Total | |
| Club | Season | Division | Apps | Goals | Apps | Goals | Apps | Goals | Apps | Goals | Apps | Goals |
|---|---|---|---|---|---|---|---|---|---|---|---|---|
| AS FAR | 2020–21 | Botola | 7 | 0 | 0 | 0 | — | | — | | 7 | 0 |
| AS FAR | 2021–22 | Botola | 0 | 0 | 0 | 0 | — | | — | | 0 | 0 |
| AS FAR | 2022–23 | Botola | 18 | 6 | 0 | 0 | — | | 10 (Note: Appearances in CAF Confederation Cup) | 3 | 28 | 9 |
| AS FAR | 2023–24 | Botola | 20 | 7 | 1 | 0 | — | | 2 (Note: Appearances in CAF Champions League) | 0 | 23 | 7 |
| AS FAR | Total | | 45 | 13 | 1 | 0 | — | | 12 | 3 | 58 | 16 |
| Rangers | 2024–25 | Scottish Premiership | 33 | 12 | 1 | 0 | 2 | 0 | 10 (Note: Appearances in UEFA Europa League) | 4 | 46 | 16 |
| Rangers | 2025–26 | Scottish Premiership | 0 | 0 | — | | 1 | 0 | 2 (Note: Appearances in UEFA Champions League) | 0 | 3 | 0 |
| Rangers | Total | | 33 | 12 | 1 | 0 | 3 | 0 | 12 | 4 | 49 | 16 |
| Lille | 2025–26 | Ligue 1 | 13 | 5 | 0 | 0 | — | | 5 | 4 | 18 | 9 |
| Career total | | | 91 | 30 | 2 | 0 | 3 | 0 | 29 | 11 | 125 | 41 |

=== International ===
As of match played 18 January 2026

Appearances and goals by national team and year
| National team | Year | Apps | Goals |
|---|---|---|---|
| Morocco | 2025 | 7 | 2 |
| Morocco | 2026 | 3 | 0 |
| Total | | 10 | 2 |

Morocco score listed first, score column indicates score after each Igamane goal.

List of international goals scored by Hamza Igamane
| No. | Date | Venue | Opponent | Score | Result | Competition |
|---|---|---|---|---|---|---|
| 1 | 5 September 2025 | Prince Moulay Abdellah Stadium, Rabat, Morocco | Niger | 4–0 | 5–0 | 2026 FIFA World Cup qualification |
| 2 | 8 September 2025 | Levy Mwanawasa Stadium, Ndola, Zambia | Zambia | 2–0 | 2–0 | 2026 FIFA World Cup qualification |

== Honours ==
AS FAR

- Botola Pro: 2022–23
- Moroccan Throne Cup: 2020–21

Rangers

- Scottish League Cup runner-up: 2024–25

Moroccan U23

- U-23 Africa Cup of Nations: 2023

Morocco

- Africa Cup of Nations: 2025

Individual

- Scottish Premiership Player of the Month: January 2025
- Rangers Young Player of the Year: 2024–25
- Rangers Goal of the Season: 2024–25
