= Connor Barron =

Scottish footballer (born 2002)

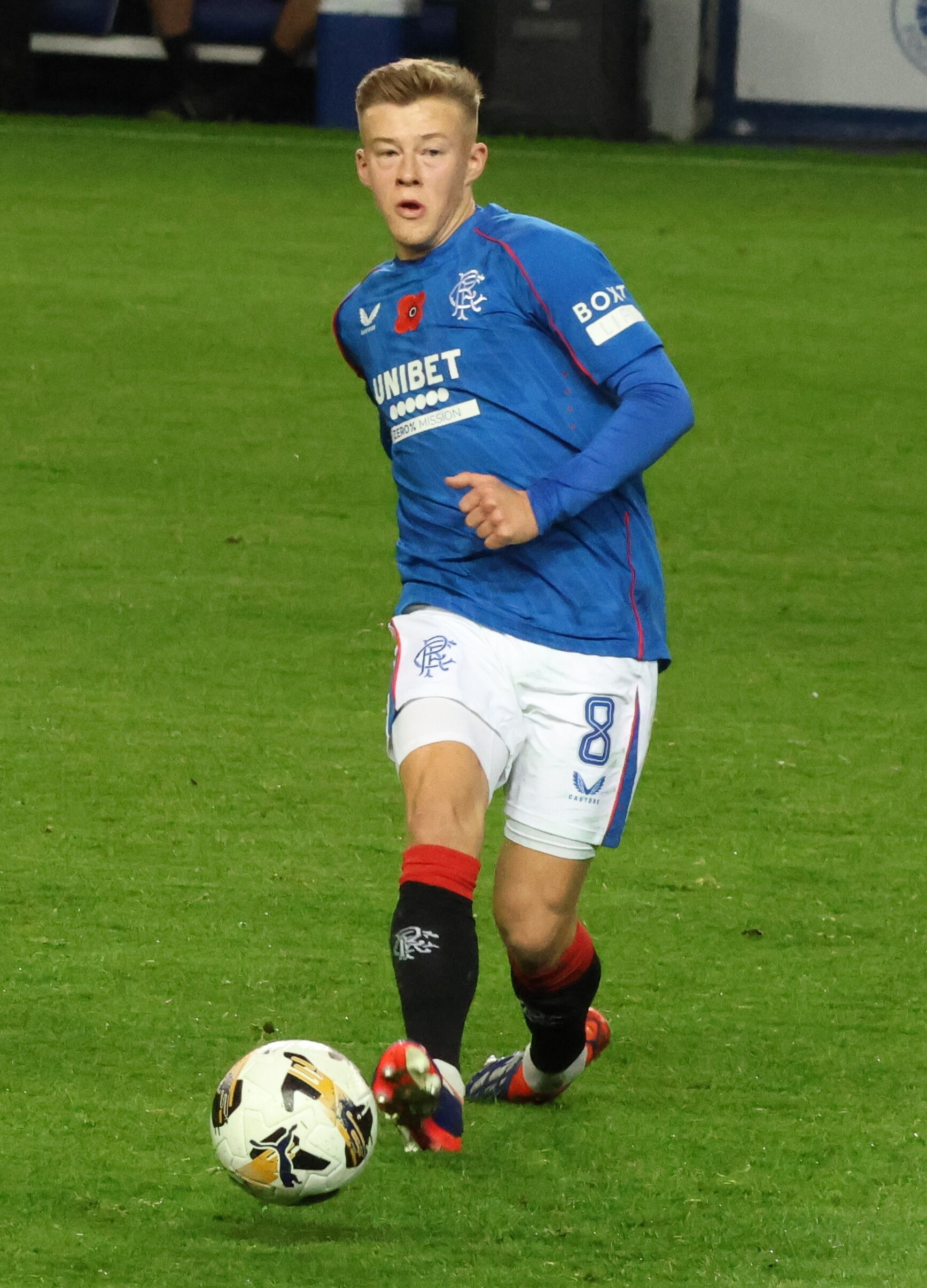
- Barron with Rangers in 2024

Personal information
- Full name: Connor Clark Barron
- Date of birth: 29 August 2002 (age 24)
- Place of birth: Kintore, Aberdeenshire, Scotland
- Height: 5 ft 9 in (1.75 m)
- Position: Midfielder

Team information
- Current team: Middlesbrough (on loan from Rangers)
- Number: 18

Youth career
- Kintore United
- 2017–2020: Aberdeen

Senior career*
| Years | Team | Apps | (Gls) |
| 2020–2024 | Aberdeen | 60 | (2) |
| 2024– | Rangers | 55 | (0) |
| 2026– | → Middlesbrough (loan) | 0 | (0) |

International career^{‡}
| 2017 | Scotland U16 | 5 | (0) |
| 2018–2019 | Scotland U17 | 10 | (0) |
| 2022– | Scotland U21 | 13 | (0) |
| 2025– | Scotland | 1 | (0) |
- * Club domestic league appearances and goals as of 23:01, 16 May 2026 (UTC) ‡ National team caps and goals as of 02:11, 10 June 2025 (UTC)

Connor Clark Barron (born 29 August 2002) is a Scottish professional footballer who plays as a midfielder for EFL Championship side Middlesbrough, on loan from Scottish Premiership side Rangers and the Scotland national team.

He began his career at Aberdeen, and during his time there had spells on loan with Brechin City and Kelty Hearts before joining Rangers in 2024.

== Club career ==
=== Aberdeen ===
Barron started playing football with Kintore United, before joining Aberdeen's youth academy at the age of eight; he went on to play for all of the age groups before signing his first professional contract and being promoted to the first team squad.

On 22 January 2022, Barron made his senior debut for Aberdeen, coming on as a half-time substitute in a 3–0 Scottish Cup victory against Edinburgh City. Two weeks earlier, he had signed a contract committing him to the Dons until 2024. He was an unused substitute during Aberdeen's defeat in the 2023 Scottish League Cup final against Rangers on 17 December 2023.

Barron left the club at the end of the 2023–24 season, upon the expiration of his contract.

=== Rangers ===
On 20 June 2024, following the expiry of his contract with Aberdeen, it was announced that Barron would join fellow Scottish Premiership side Rangers signing a four-year deal. Due to Barron's age and him being club trained, Aberdeen were entitled to a transfer fee but negotiations between the clubs stalled, therefore, an SPFL tribunal was required to decided the compensation. In December 2024, Aberdeen confirmed they had been awarded a fee of £639,920, with an additional £250,000 of performance-based adds and also a sell-on clause.

On 3 August 2024, Barron made his debut for Rangers in a league match away to Heart of Midlothian.

=== Middlesbrough (loan) ===
On 1 September 2026, Barron signed on loan for English side Middlesbrough.

== International career ==
Barron has represented Scotland at under-16, under-17 and under-21 levels.

In September 2024 he was called up to the full squad for games against Poland and Portugal, but was an unused substitute in both matches. He was called up again the following month as well. Barron made his international debut on 9 June 2025, as Scotland beat Liechtenstein 4-0, replacing Billy Gilmour in the 78th minute.

== Career statistics ==
=== Club ===
As of match played 16 May 2026

Appearances and goals by club, season and competition
| Club | Season | League | | | National cup (Note: Includes Scottish Cup, FA Cup) | | League cup (Note: Includes Scottish League Cup, EFL Cup) | | Europe | | Other | | Total | |
| Club | Season | Division | Apps | Goals | Apps | Goals | Apps | Goals | Apps | Goals | Apps | Goals | Apps | Goals |
|---|---|---|---|---|---|---|---|---|---|---|---|---|---|---|
| Aberdeen | 2020–21 | Scottish Premiership | 0 | 0 | 0 | 0 | 0 | 0 | 0 | 0 | – | | 0 | 0 |
| Aberdeen | 2021–22 | Scottish Premiership | 13 | 0 | 2 | 0 | 0 | 0 | 0 | 0 | – | | 15 | 0 |
| Aberdeen | 2022–23 | Scottish Premiership | 17 | 1 | 0 | 0 | 2 | 0 | 0 | 0 | – | | 19 | 1 |
| Aberdeen | 2023–24 | Scottish Premiership | 30 | 1 | 4 | 0 | 3 | 0 | 6 (Note: Appearances in UEFA Europa Conference League) | 0 | – | | 42 | 1 |
| Aberdeen | Total | | 60 | 2 | 6 | 0 | 5 | 0 | 6 | 0 | – | | 76 | 2 |
| Rangers | 2024–25 | Scottish Premiership | 28 | 0 | 1 | 0 | 4 | 0 | 13 (Note: Two appearances in UEFA Champions League, six appearances in UEFA Europa League) | 0 | – | | 46 | 0 |
| Rangers | 2025–26 | Scottish Premiership | 27 | 0 | 0 | 0 | 2 | 0 | 8 (Note: Two appearances in UEFA Champions League, four appearances in UEFA Europa League) | 0 | – | | 37 | 0 |
| Rangers | Total | | 55 | 0 | 1 | 0 | 6 | 0 | 21 | 0 | – | | 83 | 0 |
| Middlesbrough (loan) | 2026–27 | EFL Championship | 0 | 0 | 0 | 0 | 0 | 0 | – | | 0 | 0 | 0 | 0 |
| Career total | | | 141 | 4 | 7 | 0 | 12 | 0 | 27 | 0 | 1 | 0 | 188 | 4 |

== Honours ==
Kelty Hearts

- Scottish League Two: 2021–22

Aberdeen

- Scottish League Cup runner up: 2023–24

Rangers

- Scottish League Cup runner up: 2024–25
