= Jefté =

Brazilian footballer (born 2003)

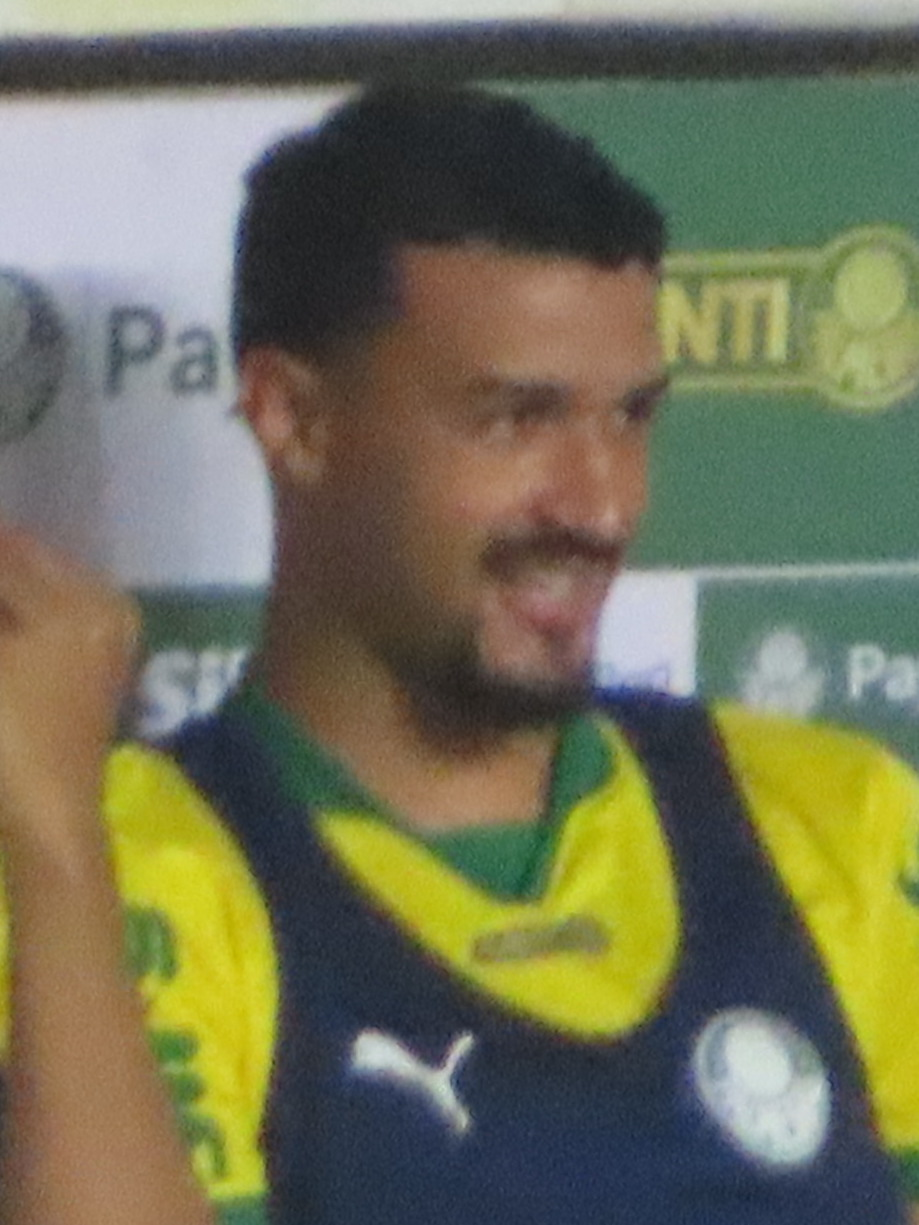
- Jefté with Palmeiras in 2025

Personal information
- Full name: Jefté Vital da Silva Dias
- Date of birth: 21 December 2003 (age 22)
- Place of birth: Rio de Janeiro, Brazil
- Height: 1.83 m (6 ft 0 in)
- Position: Left back

Team information
- Current team: Palmeiras
- Number: 6

Youth career
- Tigres do Brasil
- 2017–2023: Fluminense

Senior career*
Years	Team	Apps	(Gls)
2023–2024	Fluminense	0	(0)
2023–2024	→ APOEL (loan)	31	(3)
2024–2025	Rangers	34	(1)
2025–	Palmeiras	18	(0)
- * Club domestic league appearances and goals as of 7 April 2026

Jefté Vital da Silva Dias (born 21 December 2003), simply known as Jefté, is a Brazilian footballer who plays as a left back for Palmeiras.

== Career ==
=== Fluminense ===
Born in Rio de Janeiro, Jefté joined Fluminense's youth setup in 2017, from Tigres do Brasil. On 16 March 2021, he renewed his contract with the club until 2025.

On 4 July 2023, Jefté was loaned to Cypriot First Division side APOEL for the entire 2023–24 season; he also renewed his contract until 2026. He made his professional debut on 20 August, starting in a 2–0 away win over AEZ Zakakiou, and scored his first goal on 2 October in a 5–1 home routing of Ethnikos Achna.

=== Rangers ===
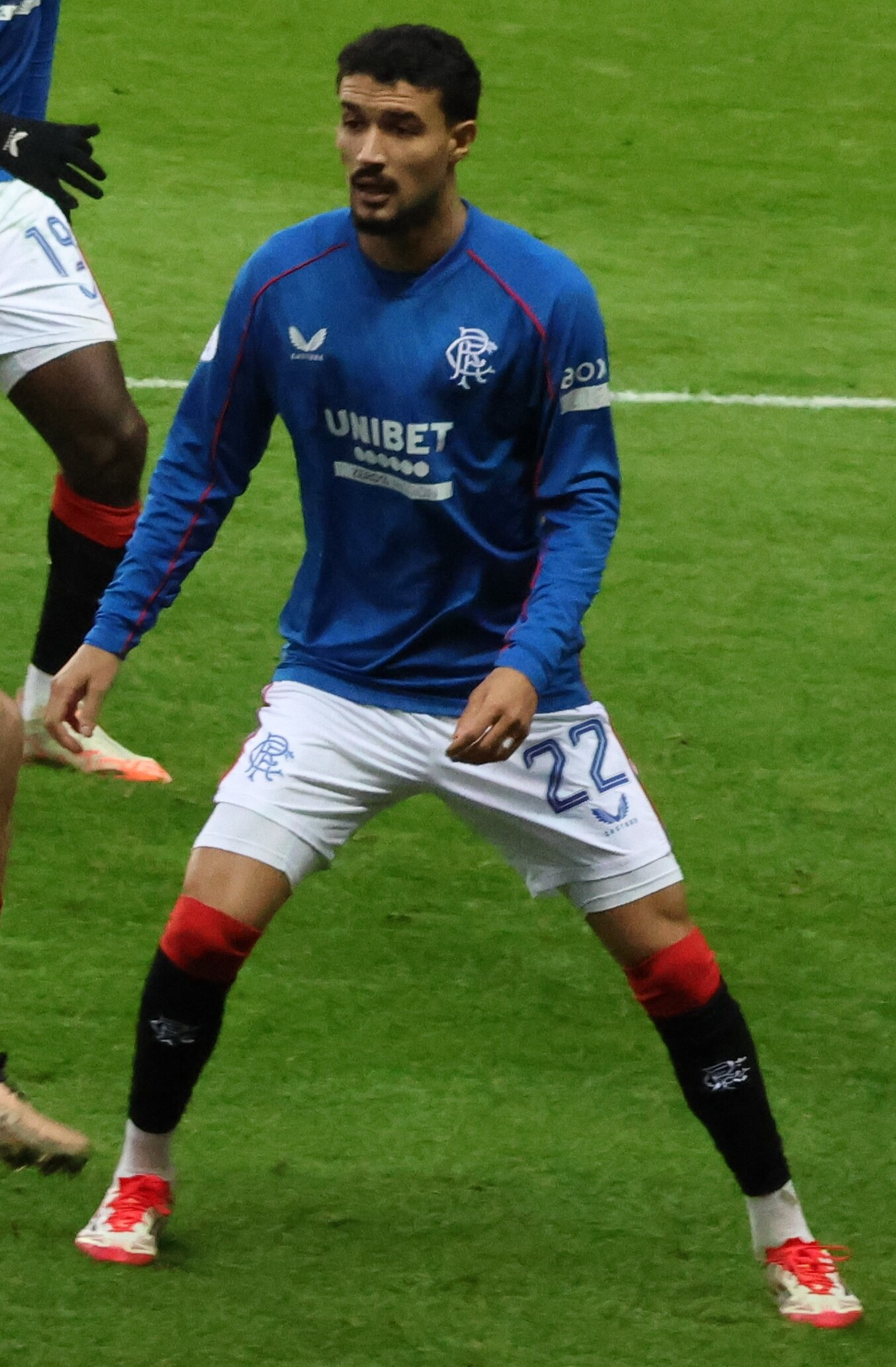
Jefté playing for Rangers in 2025

On 24 May 2024, Rangers signed Jefté on a four-year contract for a reported fee of £680,000. On 4 December 2024, he got his first assist for the club, setting up Cyriel Dessers for Rangers fifth goal in a 6–0 win against Kilmarnock.

On 11 May 2025, Jefté scored his first goal for Rangers in a 4–0 win over Aberdeen. He made a total of 52 appearances during the season, with 33 appearances in the league, two in the Scottish Cup, four in the League Cup, two in the Champions League and eleven in the Europa League; he recorded a total of one goal and four assists.

=== Palmeiras ===
On 20 August 2025, Jefté returned to Brazil to join Campeonato Brasileiro Série A side Palmeiras. The transfer fee was reported to be £6 million with add-ons and a sell-on clause included.

== Career statistics ==
As of match played 10 January 2026

Club	Season	League			State League (Note: Includes Campeonato Paulista)		National cup (Note: Includes Cypriot Cup, Scottish Cup)		League cup (Note: Includes Scottish League Cup)		Continental		Total	
Club	Season	Division	Apps	Goals	Apps	Goals	Apps	Goals	Apps	Goals	Apps	Goals	Apps	Goals
APOEL (loan)	2023–24	Cypriot First Division	31	3	—		1	0	—		1 (Note: Appearance in UEFA Europa Conference League)	0	33	3
Rangers	2024–25	Scottish Premiership	33	1	—		2	0	4	0	13 (Note: Two appearances in UEFA Champions League, eleven appearances in UEFA Europa League)	0	52	1
Rangers	2025–26	Scottish Premiership	1	0	—		—		0	0	3 (Note: Appearances in UEFA Champions League)	0	4	0
Rangers	Total		34	1	—		2	0	4	0	16	0	56	1
Palmeiras	2025	Série A	12	0	—		—		—		1 (Note: Appearance in Copa Libertadores)	0	13	0
Palmeiras	2026	Série A	0	0	1	0	0	0	—		0	0	1	0
Palmeiras	Total		12	0	1	0	0	0	—		1	0	14	0
Career total			77	4	1	0	3	0	4	0	18	0	103	4

== Honours ==
APOEL

- Cypriot First Division: 2023–24

Palmeiras

- Campeonato Paulista: 2026
