= 2024–25 FC Hansa Rostock season =

FC Hansa Rostock
2024–25 season
- Manager: Bernd Hollerbach
- Stadium: Ostseestadion
- 3. Liga: 5th
- DFB-Pokal: First round
- Mecklenburg-Vorpommern Cup: Winners
- Average home league attendance: 24,280

The 2024–25 season was the 60th season in the history of FC Hansa Rostock, and the club's first season back in 3. Liga. In addition to the domestic league, the team participated in the DFB-Pokal and Mecklenburg-Vorpommern Cup.

== Friendlies ==
=== Pre-season ===
6 July 2024 Friendly	FC Anker Wismar (Germany)	0–6	(Germany) Hansa Rostock
18:00

13 July 2024 Friendly	Hansa Rostock (Germany)	1–3	(Denmark) Randers FC
14:30

17 July 2024 Friendly	Hansa Rostock (Germany)	1–1	(Germany) VSG Altglienicke
16:30

20 July 2024 Friendly	Eintracht Braunschweig (Germany)	2–1	(Germany) Hansa Rostock
14:00

27 July 2024 Friendly	Hansa Rostock (Germany)	0–3	(Italy) SS Lazio
15:00

== Competitions ==
=== Overall record ===
Competition	First match	Last match	Starting round	Final position	Record							
Competition	First match	Last match	Starting round	Final position	Pld	W	D	L	GF	GA	GD	Win %
3. Liga	4 August 2024	17 May 2025	Matchday 1		12	3	4	5	16	16	+0	25.00
DFB-Pokal	18 August 2024		First round	First round	1	0	0	1	1	5	−4	0.00
Mecklenburg-Vorpommern Cup	7 September 2024		Second round		2	2	0	0	6	0	+6	100.00
Total					15	5	4	6	23	21	+2	33.33

Last updated: 26 October 2024
Source: Soccerway

=== 3. Liga ===
==== League table ====
Pos	Team	Pld	W	D	L	GF	GA	GD	Pts	Promotion, qualification or relegation
3	1. FC Saarbrücken	38	18	11	9	59	47	+12	65	Qualification for promotion play-offs and DFB-Pokal
4	Energie Cottbus	38	18	8	12	64	54	+10	62	Qualification for DFB-Pokal
5	Hansa Rostock	38	18	6	14	54	46	+8	60	
6	Viktoria Köln	38	18	5	15	59	48	+11	59	
7	SC Verl	38	15	12	11	62	55	+7	57	

Source: DFB
Rules for classification: 1) Points; 2) Goal difference; 3) Goals scored; 4) Head-to-head results; 5) Head-to-head away goals scored; 6) Away goals scored; 7) Play-off.

==== Matches ====
The match schedule was released on 9 July 2024.

3 August 2024 1	Hansa Rostock	1–1	VfB Stuttgart II	Rostock
16:30

10 August 2024 2	Wehen Wiesbaden	1–0	Hansa Rostock	Rostock
14:00

24 August 2024 3	Hansa Rostock	1–1	Borussia Dortmund II	Rostock
14:00 CEST	Schumacher (yellow card) 6'; Wätjen 17' (o.g.); Gürleyen (yellow card) 53'; Rossipal (yellow card) 59'; Dirkner (yellow card) 62'; Max Hagemoser (yellow card) 90+4'	Report	Almugera Kabar (yellow card) 27'; Azhil (yellow card) 67'; Paulina (yellow card) 81'; Eberwein (yellow card) 84'; Hettwer 90+5'	Stadium: Ostseestadion; Attendance: 21,500; Referee: (Germany) Martin Wilke

30 August 2024 4	Viktoria Köln	3–0	Hansa Rostock	Köln
19:00 CEST	Lobinger 5' 65'; Saïd El Mala (yellow card) 42'; Serhat-Semih Güler 68' (yellow card) 83'	Report	Rossipal (yellow card) 36'; Lebeau (yellow card) 61'	Stadium: Sportpark Höhenberg; Attendance: 6,013; Referee: (Germany) Fabienne Michel

14 September 2024 5	Hansa Rostock	1–1	Waldhof Mannheim	Rostock
14:00 CEST	Neidhart (yellow card) 84'; Roßbach 86' (yellow card) 89'; Schuster (yellow card) 90+2'	Report	Benatelli (yellow card) 31'; Boyd 64'; Matriciani (yellow card) 86'; Kobylański (yellow card) 90'	Stadium: Ostseestadion; Attendance: 22,500; Referee: (Germany) Assad Nouhoum

21 September 2024 6	Dynamo Dresden	1–1	Hansa Rostock	Dresden
14:00 CEST	Daferner 9'; Bünning (yellow card) 33'; Hauptmann (yellow card) 44'; Tony Menzel (yellow card) 90+2'	Report	Gürleyen (yellow card) 16'; Rossipal (yellow card) 57'; Ryan Naderi 74'; Roßbach (yellow card) 89'	Stadium: Rudolf-Harbig-Stadion; Attendance: 31,434; Referee: (Germany) Timo Gerach

24 September 2024 7	Hansa Rostock	4–1	Unterhaching	Rostock
19:00 CEST	Felix Ruschke 28' (yellow card) 45+11'; Schuster 34'; Haugen 66'; Neidhart (yellow card) 76'; Fröling 90+6'	Report	Stiefler (yellow card) 2'; Maximilian Hennig (yellow card) 37'; Jastremski 44' (yellow card) 71'; Knipping (yellow card) 45+8'; Tim Hoops (yellow card) 65'	Stadium: Ostseestadion; Attendance: 20,600; Referee: (Germany) Martin Speckner

29 September 2024 8	FC Ingolstadt 04	2–1	Hansa Rostock	Ingolstadt
13:30 CEST	Costly (yellow card) 19'; Testroet 33'; Grønning 70'; Fröde (yellow card) 82'	Report	Felix Ruschke 59'; Dirkner (yellow card) 77'; Lebeau (yellow card) 77'	Stadium: Audi Sportpark; Attendance: 6,097; Referee: (Germany) Konrad Oldhafer

5 October 2024 9	Erzgebirge Aue	1–2	Hansa Rostock	Aue-Bad Schlema
14:00 CET	Jakob 12'; Ali Loune (yellow card) 50' (yellow-red card) 75'; Tashchy (yellow card) 87'; Majetschak (yellow card) 90+5'	Report	Haugen 32'; Schuster (yellow card) 44'; Pfanne (yellow card) 45'; Dirkner (yellow card) 58'; Roßbach (yellow card) 63'; Gürleyen 90+1'; Neidhart (yellow card) 90+4'	Stadium: Eins Erzgebirgsstadion; Attendance: 13,218; Referee: (Germany) Eric Weisbach

19 October 2024 10	Hansa Rostock	1–2	Alemannia Aachen	Rostock
14:00 CET	Haugen 43' (yellow card) 57'; Felix Ruschke (yellow card) 47'	Report	Gaudino (yellow card) 6'; Strujić 16' 88' (yellow card) 89'; Nils Winter (yellow card) 34'; Bahn (yellow card) 62'; Lamar Yarbrough (yellow card) 90'; Bördner (yellow card) 90+1'	Stadium: Ostseestadion; Attendance: 25,000; Referee: (Germany) Felix Bickel

22 October 2024 11	1. FC Saarbrücken	2–0	Hansa Rostock	Saarbrücken
19:00 CET	Vasiliadis (yellow card) 20'; Joel Bichsel 33'; Rizzuto (yellow card) 35'; Civeja 80'; Krahn (yellow card) 90+3'	Report	Fröling (yellow card) 64'; Rossipal (yellow card) 81'; Pfanne (yellow card) 83'; Lebeau (yellow card) 90+4'	Stadium: Ludwigsparkstadion; Attendance: 13,433; Referee: (Germany) Tobias Wittmann

=== DFB-Pokal ===
18 August 2024 First round	Hansa Rostock	1–5	Hertha BSC	Rostock
15:30

=== Mecklenburg-Vorpommern Cup ===
7 September 2024 Second Round	Kühlungsborn	0-5	Hansa Rostock	Kühlungsborn
14:00 CEST		Report		Stadium: Sportplatz Ost Kühlungsborn

12 October 2024 Third Round	Neustrelitz	0-1 (a.e.t.)	Hansa Rostock	Neustrelitz
14:00 CEST		Report		Stadium: Parkstadion

16 November 2024 Round Of 16	Torgelow-Ueckermünde	0-2	Hansa Rostock	Torgelow
13:00 CEST		Report		Stadium: Gießerei-Arena

22 March 2025 Quarter-Finals	Greifswalder FC	0-1	Hansa Rostock	Greifswald
14:00 CET		Report		Stadium: Volksstadion Greifswald

1 May 2025 Semi-Finals	Schönberg	0-4	Hansa Rostock	Schönberg
14:00 CET		Report		Stadium: Jahnstadion

24 May 2025 Final	Pastow	-	Hansa Rostock	Waren (Müritz)
14:30 CET				Stadium: Müritzstadion
