= 2017–18 SV Sandhausen season =

SV Sandhausen
2017–18 season
- Manager: Kenan Kocak
- Stadium: BWT-Stadion am Hardtwald
- 2. Bundesliga: 11th
- DFB-Pokal: First round
Home colours	Away colours

The 2017–18 SV Sandhausen season was the 102nd season in the football club's history. The season covers a period from 1 July 2017 to 30 June 2018.

== Players ==
=== Squad information ===
As of 1 February 2018

Note: Flags indicate national team as defined under FIFA eligibility rules; some limited exceptions apply. Players may hold more than one non-FIFA nationality.

No.	Pos.	Nation	Player
1	GK	BIH	Goran Karačić (on loan from Adanaspor)
4	DF	GER	Damian Roßbach
5	DF	GER	Marcel Seegert
6	MF	GER	Denis Linsmayer
7	FW	USA	Andrew Wooten
8	MF	TUN	Nejmeddin Daghfous
9	MF	ISL	Rúrik Gíslason
10	FW	GER	Richard Sukuta-Pasu
11	MF	KOS	Eroll Zejnullahu (on loan from Union Berlin)
14	DF	GER	Tim Kister
16	GK	GER	Marcel Schuhen
18	FW	GER	Robert Herrmann
19	DF	KOS	Leart Paqarada
20	FW	ANG	José Pierre Vunguidica
21	MF	GER	Manuel Stiefler
22	MF	GER	Korbinian Vollmann

No.	Pos.	Nation	Player
23	MF	GER	Markus Karl
24	DF	GER	Philipp Klingmann
25	FW	USA	Haji Wright (on loan from Schalke 04)
26	FW	GER	Ali Ibrahimaj
27	MF	GER	Maximilian Jansen
28	MF	GER	Philipp Förster
29	FW	TUR	Şahin Aygüneş
30	GK	BIH	Valentino Jovic
31	MF	AUT	Stefan Kulovits (captain)
33	GK	GER	Rick Wulle
34	DF	GER	Tim Knipping
36	DF	GER	Ken Gipson
37	FW	GER	Julian Derstroff
38	FW	GER	Mirco Born
39	GK	GER	Dominik Machmeier

== Friendly matches ==
Friendly match details
Date	Time	Opponent	Venue	Result F–A	Scorers	Attendance	Ref.
1 July 2017	18:30	TuS Mechtersheim		6–0			
5 July 2017	16:00	Luzern		2–1			
9 July 2017	18:00	Zürich		2–1			
14 July 2017	18:00	SC Freiburg	Away	3–0			
18 July 2017	18:00	Huddersfield Town		3–2			
23 July 2017	14:30	Bayer Leverkusen	Home	3–2			
1 September 2017	18:30	Strasbourg	Away (Note: Match played at Stade Saint Etienne)	0–1			

== Competitions ==
=== 2. Bundesliga ===
==== League table ====
Pos	Team	Pld	W	D	L	GF	GA	GD	Pts
9	FC Ingolstadt	34	12	9	13	47	45	+2	45
10	Darmstadt 98	34	10	13	11	47	45	+2	43
11	SV Sandhausen	34	11	10	13	35	33	+2	43
12	FC St. Pauli	34	11	10	13	35	48	−13	43
13	1. FC Heidenheim	34	11	9	14	50	56	−6	42

Source: DFB
Rules for classification: 1) Points; 2) Goal difference; 3) Goals scored

==== Matches ====
2. Bundesliga match details
Match	Date	Time	Opponent	Venue	Result F–A	Scorers	Attendance	Ref.
1	30 July 2017	15:30	Holstein Kiel	Away	2–2	Sukuta-Pasu 14' pen., Klingmann 35'	9,513	
2	4 August 2017	18:30	FC Ingolstadt 04	Home	1–0	Wooten 70'	5,321	
3	19 August 2017	13:00	Dynamo Dresden	Away	4–0	Paqarada 25', Höler 71', Wright 79', Daghfous 89'	27,253	
4	27 August 2017	13:30	Fortuna Düsseldorf	Home	1–2	Höler 22'	6,769	
5	10 September 2017	13:30	Eintracht Braunschweig	Away	1–1	Klingmann 83'	19,885	
6	16 September 2017	13:00	1. FC Kaiserslautern	Home	1–0	Höler 68'	8,103	
7	19 September 2017	18:30	Union Berlin	Home	1–0	Paqarada 55'	4,893	
8	22 September 2017	18:30	Erzgebirge Aue	Away	0–1		6,800	
9	1 October 2017	13:30	Jahn Regensburg	Home	2–0	Höler 67', 84'	5,502	
10	14 October 2017	13:00	VfL Bochum	Away	0–2		13,548	
11	23 October 2017	20:30	FC St Pauli	Home	1–1	Stiefler 82'	8,514	
12	28 October 2017	13:00	Greuther Fürth	Away	1–2	Sukuta-Pasu 78'	6,870	
13	3 November 2017	18:30	MSV Duisburg	Home	0–1		5,652	
14	17 November 2017	18:30	Darmstadt 98	Away	2–1	Sukuta-Pasu 17', 71'	14,650	
15	24 November 2017	18:30	1. FC Heidenheim	Home	1–2	Knipping 28'	5,243	
16	2 December 2017	13:00	1. FC Nürnberg	Away	0–1		23,586	
17	10 December 2017	13:30	Arminia Bielefeld	Home	3–1	Sukuta-Pasu 59', Höler 45+1', Derstroff 88'	4,354	
18	17 December 2017	13:30	Holstein Kiel	Home	3–1	Paqarada 58', Höler 61 pen.', Sukuta-Pasu 71'	4,829	
19	23 January 2018	20:30	FC Ingolstadt 04	Away	0–0		7,575	
20	28 January 2018	13:30	Dynamo Dresden	Home	1–0	Linsmayer 80'	6,234	
21	2 February 2018	18:30	Fortuna Düsseldorf	Away	0–1		23,288	
22	11 February 2018	13:30	Eintracht Braunschweig	Home	0–0		4,381	
23	16 February 2018	18:30	1. FC Kaiserslautern	Away	1–0	Förster 78'	23,811	
24	24 February 2018	13:00	Union Berlin	Away	1–2	Förster 48'	18,974	
25	3 March 2018	13:00	Erzgebirge Aue	Home	1–1	Gíslason 69'	5,160	
26	11 March 2018	13:30	Jahn Regensburg	Away	1–2	Aygüneş 60'	11,885	
27	17 March 2018	13:00	VfL Bochum	Home	2–3	Stiefler 18', Gíslason 24'	6,526	
28	1 April 2018	13:30	FC St Pauli	Away	1–1	Gíslason 54'	29,381	
29	6 April 2018	18:30	Greuther Fürth	Home	0–0		6,013	
30	14 April 2018	13:00	MSV Duisburg	Away	2–0	Förster 39', Kulovits 90+3'	14,231	
31	21 April 2018	13:00	Darmstadt 98	Home	1–1	Linsmayer 10'	10,269	
32	29 April 2018	13:30	1. FC Heidenheim	Away	0–2		12,800	
33	6 May 2018	15:30	1. FC Nürnberg	Home	0–2		12,537	
34	13 May 2018	15:30	Arminia Bielefeld	Away	0–0		23,070	

=== DFB-Pokal ===
DFB-Pokal match details
Round	Date	Time	Opponent	Venue	Result F–A	Scorers	Attendance	Ref.
First round	13 August 2017	15:30	Schweinfurt 05	Away	1–2	Höler 10'	4,610	
