= 2023–24 FC Hansa Rostock season =

FC Hansa Rostock
2023–24 season
- Chairman: Robert Marien
- Manager: Alois Schwartz (until 13 December); Uwe Speidel (caretaker, 14–17 December); Mersad Selimbegović (from 18 December)
- Stadium: Ostseestadion
- 2. Bundesliga: 17th (relegated)
- DFB-Pokal: Second round
- Top goalscorer: League: Júnior Brumado; Juan José Perea; Kai Pröger (4 each); All: Júnior Brumado (5)
- Average home league attendance: 26,215

The 2023–24 season was FC Hansa Rostock's 58th season in existence and third consecutive in the 2. Bundesliga. They also competed in the DFB-Pokal.

== Players ==
=== First-team squad ===
As of 1 September 2023

Note: Flags indicate national team as defined under FIFA eligibility rules; some limited exceptions apply. Players may hold more than one non-FIFA nationality.

No.	Pos.	Nation	Player
1	GK	GER	Markus Kolke (captain)
4	DF	GER	Damian Roßbach
5	DF	GER	Oliver Hüsing
6	MF	GER	Dennis Dressel
7	DF	GER	Nico Neidhart
8	MF	GER	Simon Rhein
9	FW	GER	Kai Pröger
10	MF	SWE	Nils Fröling
11	FW	GER	Serhat-Semih Güler
13	FW	GER	Kevin Schumacher
14	MF	SWE	Svante Ingelsson
16	FW	AUT	Lukas Hinterseer
17	DF	GER	Jonas David (on loan from Hamburger SV)
18	FW	COL	Juan José Perea (on loan from VfB Stuttgart)
19	MF	GRE	Sebastian Vasiliadis
20	MF	GER	Lukas Scherff

No.	Pos.	Nation	Player
21	DF	GER	Alexander Rossipal
22	DF	SUI	Jasper van der Werff (on loan from SC Paderborn 07)
23	GK	GER	Nils Körber
24	DF	PHI	John-Patrick Strauß
25	DF	GER	Thomas Meißner
26	MF	GER	Janik Bachmann
27	MF	GER	Christian Kinsombi
28	MF	NZL	Sarpreet Singh
29	DF	GER	Felix Ruschke
30	GK	GER	Max Hagemoser
33	DF	CMR	Salomon Patrick Amougou Nkoa
35	MF	GER	Joshua Krüger
36	MF	POL	Miłosz Brzozowski
37	MF	GER	Louis Köster
38	GK	GER	Elias Höftmann
49	FW	BRA	Júnior Brumado (on loan from Midtjylland)

== Transfers ==
=== In ===
Pos.	Player	Transferred from	Fee	Date	Source
MF	(New Zealand) Sarpreet Singh	(Germany) Bayern Munich	Free	5 July 2023	
FW	(Colombia) Juan José Perea	(Germany) VfB Stuttgart	Loan	4 August 2023	
DF	(Germany) Jonas David	(Germany) Hamburger SV	Loan	29 August 2023	
FW	(Brazil) Júnior Brumado	(Denmark) FC Midtjylland	Loan	1 September 2023	

=== Out ===
Pos.	Player	Transferred from	Fee	Date	Source

== Pre-season and friendlies ==
Win Draw Loss

19 July 2023 Friendly	Hansa Rostock	1–1	BFC Dynamo

22 July 2023 Friendly	Hansa Rostock	2–1	Sevilla	Rostock, Germany
14:00 CEST (UTC+2)	Pröger 10'; Schumacher (yellow card) 18'; Bachmann 33'; Roßbach (yellow card) 46'		Mir 63'	Stadium: Ostseestadion; Attendance: 22,000; Referee: Bastian Dankert (Germany)

12 October 2023 Friendly	Hansa Rostock	1–0	Næstved BK

16 November 2023 Friendly	Werder Bremen	1–2	Hansa Rostock	Bremen
13:30 UTC+1				Attendance: 0

== Competitions ==
=== Overall record ===
Competition	First match	Last match	Starting round	Final position	Record							
Competition	First match	Last match	Starting round	Final position	Pld	W	D	L	GF	GA	GD	Win %
2. Bundesliga	28 July 2023	19 May 2024	Matchday 1	17th	34	9	4	21	30	57	−27	26.47
DFB-Pokal	13 August 2023	1 November 2023	First round	Second round	2	0	1	1	3	4	−1	0.00
Total					36	9	5	22	33	61	−28	25.00

Source: Soccerway

=== 2. Bundesliga ===
==== League table ====
Pos	Team	Pld	W	D	L	GF	GA	GD	Pts	Qualification or relegation
14	1. FC Magdeburg	34	9	11	14	46	54	−8	38	
15	Eintracht Braunschweig	34	11	5	18	37	53	−16	38	
16	Wehen Wiesbaden (R)	34	8	8	18	36	50	−14	32	Qualification for relegation play-offs
17	Hansa Rostock (R)	34	9	4	21	30	57	−27	31	Relegation to 3. Liga
18	VfL Osnabrück (R)	34	6	10	18	31	69	−38	28	Relegation to 3. Liga

Source: DFB
Rules for classification: 1) Points; 2) Goal difference; 3) Goals scored; 4) Head-to-head results; 5) Head-to-head away goals scored; 6) Away goals scored; 7) Play-off.
(Rules 4–6 only apply after home and away matches have been played between the tied teams.)
(R) Relegated

==== Results summary ====
Overall								Home						Away					
Pld	W	D	L	GF	GA	GD	Pts	W	D	L	GF	GA	GD	W	D	L	GF	GA	GD
34	9	4	21	30	57	−27	31	6	2	9	20	27	−7	3	2	12	10	30	−20

Source: DFB

==== Results by round ====
Round	1	2	3	4
Ground	H	A	H	A
Result	W	W	L	
Position	3	1	4	

Source: DFB
A = Away; H = Home; W = Win; D = Draw; L = Loss

==== Matches ====
The league fixtures were unveiled on 30 June 2023.

30 July 2023 1	Hansa Rostock	2–0	1. FC Nürnberg	Rostock
				Stadium: Ostseestadion

5 August 2023 2	SV Elversberg	1–2	Hansa Rostock	Saarbrücken
13:00 UTC+2	Sickinger 56'	Report	Perea 90+10', 90+13'	Stadium: Ludwigsparkstadion; Attendance: 8,371; Referee: Robert Kampka

19 August 2023 3	Hansa Rostock	1–2	Hannover 96	Rostock
				Stadium: Ostseestadion

26 August 2023 4	Hansa Rostock	2–1	VfL Osnabrück	Rostock
				Stadium: Ostseestadion

3 September 2023 5	Hamburger SV	2–0	Hansa Rostock	Hamburg
13:30 UTC+2	Reis 45+6'; Bénes 48'; Jatta (yellow card) 57'; Van Der Brempt (yellow card) 80'	Report	Pröger (yellow card) 19'; Ingelsson (yellow card) 32'; Schumacher (yellow card) 40'; Neidhart (yellow card) 83'; Kinsombi (yellow card) 84'	Stadium: Volksparkstadion; Attendance: 55,000; Referee: Benjamin Brand

16 September 2023 7	Hansa Rostock	1–3	Fortuna Düsseldorf	Rostock
				Stadium: Ostseestadion

30 September 2023 9	Hansa Rostock	1–0	Eintracht Braunschweig	Rostock
				Stadium: Ostseestadion

22 October 2023 11	Hansa Rostock	1–3	Holstein Kiel	Rostock
				Stadium: Ostseestadion

5 November 2023 13	Hansa Rostock	0–0	Hertha BSC	Rostock
				Stadium: Ostseestadion

25 November 2023 15	Hansa Rostock	2–3	FC St. Pauli	Rostock
				Stadium: Ostseestadion

10 December 2023 17	Hansa Rostock	0–2	Schalke 04	Rostock
				Stadium: Ostseestadion

27 January 2024 19	Hansa Rostock	2–1	SV Elversberg	Rostock
				Stadium: Ostseestadion

11 February 2024 21	VfL Osnabrück	0–0	Hansa Rostock	Osnabrück
				Stadium: Stadion an der Bremer Brücke

17 February 2024 22	Hansa Rostock	2–2	Hamburger SV	Rostock
13:00 UTC+1	Perea 50'; Roßbach (yellow card) 55'; Guðjohnsen 82'; Ingelsson (yellow card) 86'; Kolke (yellow card) 87'; Lang (yellow card) 90+2'	Report	Ambrosius (yellow card) 28'; Dompé 34'; Ramos (yellow card) 43'; Glatzel 86'	Stadium: Ostseestadion; Attendance: 27,500; Referee: Felix Zwayer

25 February 2024 23	Fortuna Düsseldorf	2–0	Hansa Rostock	Düsseldorf
				Stadium: Merkur Spiel-Arena

2 March 2024 24	Hansa Rostock	0–3	1. FC Kaiserslautern	Rostock
				Stadium: Ostseestadion

8 March 2024 25	Eintracht Braunschweig	0–1	Hansa Rostock	Braunschweig
				Stadium: Eintracht-Stadion

16 March 2024 26	Hansa Rostock	1–0	Greuther Fürth	Rostock
				Stadium: Ostseestadion

30 March 2024 27	Holstein Kiel	2–0	Hansa Rostock	Kiel
				Stadium: Holstein-Stadion

5 April 2024 28	Hansa Rostock	3–1	Wehen Wiesbaden	Rostock
				Stadium: Ostseestadion

12 April 2024 29	Hertha BSC	4–0	Hansa Rostock	Berlin
				Stadium: Olympiastadion

21 April 2024 30	Hansa Rostock	0–2	1. FC Magdeburg	Rostock
				Stadium: Ostseestadion

26 April 2024 31	FC St. Pauli	1–0	Hansa Rostock	Hamburg
				Stadium: Millerntor-Stadion

4 May 2024 32	Hansa Rostock	1–2	Karlsruher SC	Rostock
				Stadium: Ostseestadion

11 May 2024 33	Schalke 04	2–1	Hansa Rostock	Gelsenkirchen
13:00				Stadium: Veltins-Arena

19 May 2024 34	Hansa Rostock	1–2	SC Paderborn	Rostock
15:30				Stadium: Ostseestadion

=== DFB-Pokal ===
13 August 2023 First round	FSV Frankfurt	1–1 (a.e.t.) (0–3 p)	Hansa Rostock	Frankfurt
18:00	McLemore 29'	Report	Güler 83'	Stadium: PSD Bank Arena; Attendance: 7,374; Referee: Christian Dingert
	Penalties
	Azaouagh (penalty missed); Falaye (penalty missed); Emmerling (penalty missed)		(penalty scored) Bachmann; (penalty scored) Rossipal; (penalty scored) Güler

1 November 2023 Second round	1. FC Nürnberg	3–2 (a.e.t.)	Hansa Rostock	Nuremberg
20:45	Okunuki 63'; Lohkemper 90+5', 99'	Report	Brumado 58'; Kinsombi 74'	Stadium: Max-Morlock-Stadion; Attendance: 28,489; Referee: Arne Aarnink
