= Ryan Naderi =

German footballer (born 2003)

Personal information
- Full name: Ryan Don Naderi
- Date of birth: 10 July 2003 (age 23)
- Place of birth: Dresden, Germany
- Height: 1.94 m (6 ft 4 in)
- Position: Forward

Team information
- Current team: Rangers
- Number: 20

Youth career
- SG Dresden Striesen
- Soccer for Kids Dresden
- 2015–2021: Dynamo Dresden
- 2021–2022: Borussia Mönchengladbach

Senior career*
Years	Team	Apps	(Gls)
2022–2024	Borussia Mönchengladbach II	53	(10)
2024–2026	Hansa Rostock	42	(13)
2026–	Rangers	21	(8)

International career^{‡}
2026–	Czech Republic	4	(0)
- * Club domestic league appearances and goals as of 02:27, 22 November 2026 (UTC) ‡ National team caps and goals as of 15 November 2026

Ryan Don Naderi (Bulgarian: Райън Дон Надери; born 10 July 2003) is a professional footballer who plays as a forward for Scottish Premiership club Rangers. Born in Germany to a Czech mother and Bulgarian father, he plays for the Czech Republic national team.

== Early life ==
Naderi grew up in Dresden. He started his journey in football playing for SG Dresden Striesen and Soccer for Kids in Dresden before moving to the youth academy of Dynamo Dresden in 2015. With Dynamo Dresden he played two seasons in the Under-17 Bundesliga and in the Under-19 Bundesliga in 2020–21. For the 2021–22 season, he moved to Borussia Mönchengladbach, where he played in the West division of the Under-19 Bundesliga.his

== Career ==
=== Borussia Mönchengladbach ===
Naderi made his debut in the 2021–22 season when he came on as a substitute for Borussia Mönchengladbach II during a Regionalliga West home match against Schalke 04 II on 22 January 2022. Despite having a professional contract, he was not included in the Bundesliga's senior squad.

=== Hansa Rostock ===
Naderi then transferred to 3. Liga side Hansa Rostock at the end of August 2024, after two years at Borussia Mönchengladbach II. On 14 September 2024, Naderi made his professional debut in a home game against Waldhof Manheim that finished in a 1–1 draw, coming on as a substitute in the 59th minute. A week later, Naderi scored his first goal for Hansa Rostock in an away game against his former club Dynamo Dresden that finished as a 1–1 draw. In the 2024–25 season, Naderi finished fifth with Hansa and won the Mecklenburg-Vorpommern Cup. After scoring two goals in a 4–2 away win against Viktoria Köln, Naderi was voted "Player of Matchday 12" in the 2025–26 season. Naderi was also voted "Player of Matchday 21" after a 4–0 away win over Waldhof Manheim, in which he collected a hat-trick of assists.

=== Rangers ===
On 3 February 2026, Naderi signed for Scottish Premiership side Rangers on a long-term deal for an undisclosed fee, which was widely reported to be £4.7 million. Rangers had initially agreed to sign the striker in the summer for a fee of £3 million but increased their offer in order to push through the deal on transfer deadline day. Two days later Naderi made his debut for Rangers coming on as a second half substitute as Rangers defeated Kilmarnock 5–1 in a league match at Ibrox. On 8 February 2026, Naderi started his first game for Rangers against Queens Park in the Scottish Cup and scored a brace as Rangers won the match 8–0 to advance to the quarter-final. On 4 April 2026, he scored his first Scottish Premiership goal in a 4–2 victory over Dundee Utd but also suffered a muscle injury during the match which required him to be substituted at half-time causing him to only play in one more game the rest of the season.

On 16 August 2026, Naderi started the season by scoring his first ever Scottish League Cup goal in a 5–1 victory over St Mirren a game in which he also got an assist. Four days later he scored his first UEFA Conference League goal in a 1–0 victory over Jablonec. On 5 September 2026, he scored his first league goal of the season in a 1–0 win over Motherwell. On 20 September 2026, Naderi scored his first Old Firm goal against Rangers rivals Celtic which was the only goal in a 1–0 victory. On 24 September, Naderi scored his fifth league goal in six games in a 4–0 victory over St Johnstone. On 31 October 2026, he scored the only goal in the Scottish League Cup semi-final against Aberdeen to put Rangers into the final. On 21 November 2026, he scored an 89th-minute winning goal against Motherwell to save all three points for Rangers as they won the match 2–1 this was also Naderi’s tenth goal of the season and the first time in his career he had scored double figures in the same season.

== International career ==
Naderi was eligible to represent Germany, Bulgaria and Czech Republic. In March 2026 he was approached by Bulgaria's manager Aleksandar Dimitrov to join the team for the 2026 FIFA Series. In September 2026, he made the definitive decision to represent the Czech Republic. On 29 September 2026, Naderi was called up to the Czech Republic national team for 2026–27 UEFA Nations League fixtures. He made his full international debut on 3 October in a Nations League match against FIFA World Cup holders Spain.

== Career statistics ==
As of match played 21 November 2026

Appearances and goals by club, season and competition
Club	Season	League			National cup (Note: Includes DFB-Pokal, Scottish Cup)		League cup (Note: Includes Scottish League Cup)		Europe		Total	
Club	Season	Division	Apps	Goals	Apps	Goals	Apps	Goals	Apps	Goals	Apps	Goals
Borussia Mönchengladbach II	2021–22	Regionalliga West	1	0	—		—		—		1	0
Borussia Mönchengladbach II	2022–23	Regionalliga West	19	3	—		—		—		19	3
Borussia Mönchengladbach II	2023–24	Regionalliga West	28	6	—		—		—		28	6
Borussia Mönchengladbach II	2024–25	Regionalliga West	5	1	—		—		—		5	1
Borussia Mönchengladbach II	Total		53	10	—		—		—		53	10
Hansa Rostock	2024–25	3. Liga	24	5	3	0	—		—		27	5
Hansa Rostock	2025–26	3. Liga	18	8	0	0	—		—		18	8
Hansa Rostock	Total		42	13	3	0	—		—		45	13
Rangers	2025–26	Scottish Premiership	9	1	2	2	—		—		11	3
Rangers	2026–27	Scottish Premiership	12	7	0	0	3	2	3 (Note: One appearance in UEFA Europa League, two appearance and one goal in UEFA Conference League)	1	18	10
Rangers	Total		21	8	2	2	3	2	3	1	29	13
Career total			116	31	5	2	3	2	3	1	127	36

=== International ===
As of match played 15 November 2026

Appearances and goals by national team and year
National team	Year	Apps	Goals
Czech Republic	2026	4	0
Total		4	0

== Personal life ==
Naderi has two older brothers. His mother is from the Czech Republic, and his father is from Bulgaria. Naderi holds Czech, German and Bulgarian citizenship.

== Honours ==
Hansa Rostock

- Mecklenburg-Vorpommern Cup: 2024–25
