= 2022–23 FC Hansa Rostock season =

FC Hansa Rostock
2022–23 season
- Chairman: Robert Marien
- Manager: Jens Härtel
- Stadium: Ostseestadion
- 2. Bundesliga: 13th
- DFB-Pokal: First round
Home colours	Away colours
- All statistics correct as of 12 November 2022.

The 2022–23 season is the 57th in the history of FC Hansa Rostock and their second consecutive season in the second division. The club will participate in the 2. Bundesliga and the DFB-Pokal.

== Players ==
=== First-team squad ===
As of 23 June 2022

Note: Flags indicate national team as defined under FIFA eligibility rules; some limited exceptions apply. Players may hold more than one non-FIFA nationality.

No.	Pos.	Nation	Player
1	GK	GER	Markus Kolke (captain)
4	DF	GER	Damian Roßbach
6	MF	GER	Dennis Dressel
7	DF	GER	Nico Neidhart
8	MF	GER	Simon Rhein
9	FW	SUI	Ridge Munsy
10	FW	BIH	Haris Duljević
11	MF	GER	Morris Schröter
13	FW	GER	Kevin Schumacher
14	MF	SWE	Svante Ingelsson
15	MF	SWE	Nils Fröling
16	DF	USA	Ryan Malone
18	FW	NED	John Verhoek
19	FW	GER	Kai Pröger

No.	Pos.	Nation	Player
20	MF	GER	Lukas Scherff
23	GK	GER	Nils-Jonathan Körber
24	DF	PHI	John-Patrick Strauß
25	DF	GER	Thomas Meißner
27	DF	GER	Frederic Ananou
28	MF	GER	Maurice Litka
29	MF	LUX	Sébastien Thill
30	GK	GER	Max Hagemoser
31	DF	GER	Felix Ruschke
32	DF	GER	Benno Dietze
33	FW	GER	Theo Martens
34	DF	GER	Lukas Fröde
39	FW	GER	Pascal Breier

=== Out on loan ===
Note: Flags indicate national team as defined under FIFA eligibility rules; some limited exceptions apply. Players may hold more than one non-FIFA nationality.

No.	Pos.	Nation	Player
—	MF	GER	Oliver Daedlow (at TSV Havelse)
—	MF	GER	Luca Horn (at FSV Zwickau)

No.	Pos.	Nation	Player
—	FW	GER	Gian Luca Schulz (at Energie Cottbus)
—	FW	GER	Michel Ulrich (at Berliner AK 07)

== Pre-season and friendlies ==
Win Draw Loss Fixtures

17 June 2022 Friendly	Dynamo Schwerin (Germany)	1–6	(Germany) Hansa Rostock	Schwerin
18:00 CEST (UTC+2)				Stadium: Stadion Lambrechtsgrund

2 July 2022 Friendly	Austria Klagenfurt	0–0	(Germany) Hansa Rostock	Seeboden, Austria
16:00 CEST (UTC+2)				Stadium: Sportarena Seeboden

7 July 2022 Friendly	Anker Wismar (Germany)	0–10	(Germany) Hansa Rostock	Wismar
18:00 CEST (UTC+2)				Stadium: Kurt-Bürger-Stadion

9 July 2022 Friendly	Hansa Rostock (Germany)	3–1	(Denmark) Brøndby IF	Rostock
14:00 CEST (UTC+2)				Stadium: Ostseestadion

22 September 2022 Friendly	VfL Wolfsburg (Germany)	0–0	(Germany) Hansa Rostock	Wolfsburg
13:00 CEST (UTC+2)		Report		Stadium: AOK Stadion; Attendance: 0 Referee: Robert Schröder

9 January 2023 Friendly	Cracovia (Poland)	0–6	(Germany) Hansa Rostock	Belek, Turkey
14:30 TRT (UTC+3)				Stadium: Hotel RIU Kaya - Field D

== Competitions ==
=== 2. Bundesliga ===
==== League table ====
Pos	Team	Pld	W	D	L	GF	GA	GD	Pts
11	1. FC Magdeburg	34	12	7	15	48	55	−7	43
12	Greuther Fürth	34	10	11	13	47	50	−3	41
13	Hansa Rostock	34	12	5	17	32	48	−16	41
14	1. FC Nürnberg	34	10	9	15	32	49	−17	39
15	Eintracht Braunschweig	34	9	9	16	42	59	−17	36

Source: DFB
Rules for classification: 1) Points; 2) Goal difference; 3) Goals scored; 4) Head-to-head results; 5) Head-to-head away goals scored; 6) Away goals scored; 7) Play-off.

==== Matches ====
The league fixtures were announced on 17 June 2022.

2. Bundesliga match details
Match	Date	Time	Opponent	Venue	Result F–A	Scorers	Attendance	League position	Ref.
1	17 July 2022	13:30	1. FC Heidenheim	Home	0–1		24,000	15th	
2	24 July 2022	13:30	Hamburger SV	Away	1–0	Schumacher 90+4'	54,500	11th	
3	6 August 2022	20:30	Arminia Bielefeld	Home	2–1	Pröger 25', Roßbach 85'	24,300	8th	
4	13 August 2022	20:30	SV Darmstadt 98	Away	0–4		14,120	11th	
5	21 August 2022	13:30	FC St. Pauli	Home	2–0	Pröger 4', Verhoek 17'	26,000	6th	
6	27 August 2022	13:00	Karlsruher SC	Away	0–2		17,435	10th	
7	4 September 2022	13:30	Hannover 96	Home	0–1		24,500	11th	
8	10 September 2022	20:30	Fortuna Düsseldorf	Away	1–3	Fröde 61'	26,719	12th	
9	17 September 2022	13:00	1. FC Magdeburg	Home	3–1	Pröger 30', 41', Fröde 64'	26,500	9th	
10	1 October 2022	13:00	Holstein Kiel	Away	1–1	Hinterseer 88'	12,432	10th	
11	8 October 2022	13:00	SC Paderborn 07	Home	0–3		24,500	10th	
12	14 October 2022	18:30	Greuther Fürth	Away	2–2	Fröde 57', Malone 90+3' pen.	10,516	13th	
13	21 October 2022	18:30	1. FC Kaiserslautern	Home	0–2		25,000	13th	
14	29 October 2022	13:00	Jahn Regensburg	Away	3–0	Pröger 7', 26', Elvedi 64' o.g.	10,380	12th	
15	4 November 2022	18:30	SV Sandhausen	Home	0–1		24,500	12th	
16	9 November 2022	18:30	1. FC Nürnberg	Home	1–1	Fröling 90+1'	23,500	12th	
17	12 November 2022	20:30	Eintracht Braunschweig	Away	1–0	Ingelsson 60'	21,221	9th	
18	28 January 2023	13:00	1. FC Heidenheim	Away	0–2		9,267	9th	
19	5 February 2023	13:30	Hamburger SV	Home	0–2		26,500	12th	
20	10 February 2023	18:30	Arminia Bielefeld	Away	1–0	Fröde 51'	22,527	10th	
21	18 February 2023	20:30	SV Darmstadt 98	Home	0–1		25,200	12th	
22	26 February 2023	13:30	FC St. Pauli	Away	0–1		29,205	13th	
23	5 March 2023	13:30	Karlsruher SC	Home	0–2		23,500	14th	
24	12 March 2023	13:30	Hannover 96	Away	1–1	Dressel 44'	31,600	14th	
25	19 March 2023	13:30	Fortuna Düsseldorf	Home	2–5	Pröger 57', Schumacher 78'	23,500	17th	
26	2 April 2023	13:30	1. FC Magdeburg	Away	0–3		26,480	17th	
27	9 April 2023	13:30	Holstein Kiel	Home	2–3	van Drongelen 12', Hinterseer 53'	24,300	17th	
28	15 April 2023	13:00	SC Paderborn 07	Away	0–3		12,456	17th	
29	22 April 2023	13:00	Greuther Fürth	Home	2–0	Fröling 50', Dressel 66'	24,000	17th	
30	29 April 2023	13:00	1. FC Kaiserslautern	Away	1–0	Pröger 42'	42,795	15th	
31	6 May 2023	13:00	Jahn Regensburg	Home	2–0	Pröger 34', Verhoek 80'	25,000	15th	
32	12 May 2023	18:30	SV Sandhausen	Away	2–1	Fröling 17', Pröger 37' pen.	7,013	13th	
33	21 May 2023	13:30	1. FC Nürnberg	Away	0–0		38,579	13th	
34	28 May 2023	15:30	Eintracht Braunschweig	Home	2–1	Fröde 58', Breier 90+3'	26,500	13th	

=== DFB-Pokal ===
DFB-Pokal match details
Round	Date	Time	Opponent	Venue	Result F–A	Scorers	Attendance	Ref.
First round	30 July 2022	15:30	VfB Lübeck	Away	0–1		10,351	
