= Frederic Ananou =

Togolese footballer (born 1997)

Personal information
- Full name: Kangni Frederic Ananou
- Date of birth: 20 September 1997 (age 29)
- Place of birth: Munich, Germany
- Height: 1.83 m (6 ft 0 in)
- Position: Centre back

Team information
- Current team: Olimpija Ljubljana
- Number: 27

Youth career
- 2003–2006: TV Rheindorf
- 2006–2007: 1. JFS Köln
- 2007–2016: 1. FC Köln

Senior career*
Years	Team	Apps	(Gls)
2016–2018	Roda JC Kerkrade	29	(0)
2018–2020	FC Ingolstadt 04	30	(1)
2018–2019	FC Ingolstadt 04 II	5	(0)
2020–2022	SC Paderborn	21	(0)
2022–2023	Hansa Rostock	20	(0)
2023–2025	Sint-Truiden	24	(0)
2025	Jahn Regensburg	11	(0)
2025–	Olimpija Ljubljana	0	(0)

International career^{‡}
2016	Germany U19	2	(0)
2016–2018	Germany U20	12	(0)
2022–	Togo	5	(0)
- * Club domestic league appearances and goals as of 24 May 2025 ‡ National team caps and goals as of 17:29, 29 March 2024 (UTC)

Kangni Frederic Ananou (born 20 September 1997) is a professional footballer who plays as a centre back for Slovenian club Olimpija Ljubljana. Born in Germany, he plays for the Togo national team.

== Club career ==
Ananou came through the youth ranks at 1. FC Köln before joining Dutch side Roda JC Kerkrade in summer 2016.

On 3 July 2022, Ananou joined Hansa Rostock on a one-season deal.

On 10 January 2025, Ananou returned to Germany and signed with Jahn Regensburg until the end of the 2024–25 season.

On 1 July 2025, Ananou moved to Olimpija Ljubljana in Slovenia on a two-season deal.

== International career ==
Ananou was born in Germany to Togolese parents. He was called up and capped by the Germany U19 and U20 teams in 2016. He debuted for the Togo national team in a 3–0 friendly win over Sierra Leone on 24 March 2022.

== Career statistics ==
As of match played 30 March 2025

Appearances and goals by club, season and competition
Club	Season	League			Cup (Note: Includes the KNVB Cup and DFB-Pokal)		Continental		Other		Total	
Club	Season	Division	Apps	Goals	Apps	Goals	Apps	Goals	Apps	Goals	Apps	Goals
Roda JC Kerkrade	2016–17	Eredivisie	18	0	0	0	—		—		18	0
Roda JC Kerkrade	2017–18	Eredivisie	11	0	3	0	—		—		14	0
Roda JC Kerkrade	Total		29	0	3	0	0	0	0	0	32	0
FC Ingolstadt 04	2017–18	2. Bundesliga	3	0	0	0	—		—		3	0
FC Ingolstadt 04	2018–19	2. Bundesliga	15	1	1	0	—		0	0	16	1
FC Ingolstadt 04	2019–20	3. Liga	12	0	0	0	—		1 (Note: Appearance in the 3. Liga promotion play-offs)	0	13	0
FC Ingolstadt 04	Total		30	1	1	0	0	0	1	0	32	1
FC Ingolstadt 04 II	2017–18	Regionalliga	1	0	—		—		—		1	0
FC Ingolstadt 04 II	2018–19	Regionalliga	2	0	—		—		—		2	0
FC Ingolstadt 04 II	2019–21	Bayernliga	2	0	—		—		—		2	0
FC Ingolstadt 04 II	Total		5	0	0	0	0	0	0	0	5	0
SC Paderborn	2020–21	2. Bundesliga	15	0	3	0	—		—		18	0
SC Paderborn	2021–22	2. Bundesliga	6	0	0	0	—		—		6	0
SC Paderborn	Total		21	0	3	0	0	0	0	0	24	0
Hansa Rostock	2022–23	2. Bundesliga	20	0	0	0	—		—		20	0
Hansa Rostock	Total		20	0	0	0	0	0	0	0	20	0
Sint-Truiden	2023–24	Belgian Pro League	19	0	1	0	—		—		20	0
Sint-Truiden	2024–25	Belgian Pro League	5	0	0	0	—		—		5	0
Sint-Truiden	Total		24	0	1	0	0	0	0	0	25	0
Jahn Regensburg	2024–25	2. Bundesliga	6	0	0	0	—		—		6	0
Jahn Regensburg	Total		7	0	0	0	0	0	0	0	7	0
Career total			136	1	8	0	0	0	1	0	145	1
