= Markus Kolke =

German footballer (born 1990)

Personal information
- Date of birth: 18 August 1990 (age 36)
- Place of birth: Erlenbach am Main, West Germany
- Height: 1.87 m (6 ft 2 in)
- Position: Goalkeeper

Team information
- Current team: Werder Bremen
- Number: 25

Youth career
- –2004: TSV Großheubach
- 2004–2009: Viktoria Aschaffenburg

Senior career*
Years	Team	Apps	(Gls)
2008–2009	Viktoria Aschaffenburg	1	(0)
2009–2010	Eintracht Frankfurt II	4	(0)
2010–2011	Waldhof Mannheim	36	(0)
2011–2013	Wehen Wiesbaden II	13	(0)
2011–2019	Wehen Wiesbaden	210	(0)
2019–2024	Hansa Rostock	177	(0)
2024–	Werder Bremen	0	(0)
- * Club domestic league appearances and goals as of 7 June 2024

Markus Kolke (born 18 August 1990) is a German professional footballer who plays as a goalkeeper for Bundesliga club Werder Bremen.

After playing in the lower tiers of German football, Kolke established himself as a starter for Wehen Wiesbaden in 2011. He played at the club for eight years, making 232 appearances and experiencing promotion to the 2. Bundesliga in his final season at the club. In 2019, Kolke moved to 3. Liga club Hansa Rostock, where he became team captain after one season.

== Career ==
Born in Erlenbach am Main, Bavaria, Kolke played youth football at TSV Großheubach and Viktoria Aschaffenburg. In 2009, he moved to the second team of Eintracht Frankfurt. There, he was mainly a backup. After a year in Frankfurt, he went to fifth-tier Oberliga Baden-Württemberg club Waldhof Mannheim. He immediately became the starting goalkeeper and played all matches for the club during the 2010–11 season, where the club won the championship and promoted to the Regionalliga.

In the summer of 2011, Kolke moved to SV Wehen Wiesbaden. He won the starting job over Michael Gurski in October 2013 and has featured as the team's regular goalkeeper since. He became notorious for saving penalties while at Wehen, saving six out of seven penalties during the 2016–17 season. Through promotion play-offs, Kolke, who was also team captain at times, was able to help the club reach promotion to the 2. Bundesliga. In his eight-year tenure with Wehen Wiesbaden, he made 232 appearances as the main goalkeeper, 210 of them in league games.

Nevertheless, he joined Hansa Rostock for the 2019–20 3. Liga season, where he signed a two-year contract as the successor to the outgoing goalkeeper Ioannis Gelios. Kolke immediately established himself as the starting goalkeeper under Hansa manager Jens Härtel, making all 38 league appearances for Rostock. He kept a clean sheet and also played in the DFB Pokal against 2. Bundesliga outfit VfB Stuttgart (1–0). Kolke became the new record-holding goalkeeper in 3. Liga appearances in a 1–1 draw at Mannheim with 220 appearances, taking over the top spot from previous record holder Robert Wulnikowski. At the end of the season, Hansa finished sixth in the league table and won the Mecklenburg-Vorpommern Cup. In the final, Torgelower FC Greif was defeated 3–0. Ahead of the 2020–21 season, Kolke was appointed team captain. As in the previous season, the team faced VfB Stuttgart, now a Bundesliga side, in the DFB Pokal, and again lost the matchup (1–0).

On 7 June 2024, Kolke signed with Werder Bremen as a third goalkeeper.

== Career statistics ==
As of matches played on 19 May 2024

Appearances and goals by club, season and competition
Club	Season	League			Cup		Europe		Other		Total	
Club	Season	Division	Apps	Goals	Apps	Goals	Apps	Goals	Apps	Goals	Apps	Goals
Viktoria Aschaffenburg	2008–09	Regionalliga Süd	1	0	—		—		—		1	0
Eintracht Frankfurt II	2009–10	Regionalliga Süd	4	0	—		—		—		4	0
Waldhof Mannheim	2010–11	Oberliga	36	0	—		—		—		36	0
Wehen Wiesbaden II	2011–12	Hessenliga	3	0	—		—		1	0	4	0
Wehen Wiesbaden II	2012–13	Hessenliga	8	0	—		—		3	0	11	0
Wehen Wiesbaden II	2013–14	Hessenliga	2	0	—		–		3	0	5	0
Wehen Wiesbaden II	Total		13	0	—		—		7	0	20	0
Wehen Wiesbaden	2011–12	3. Liga	0	0	0	0	—		—		0	0
Wehen Wiesbaden	2012–13	3. Liga	2	0	—		—		—		2	0
Wehen Wiesbaden	2013–14	3. Liga	25	0	—		—		—		25	0
Wehen Wiesbaden	2014–15	3. Liga	37	0	0	0	—		—		37	0
Wehen Wiesbaden	2015–16	3. Liga	38	0	—		—		—		38	0
Wehen Wiesbaden	2016–17	3. Liga	34	0	—		—		—		34	0
Wehen Wiesbaden	2017–18	3. Liga	37	0	2	0	—		—		39	0
Wehen Wiesbaden	2018–19	3. Liga	37	0	2	0	—		2	0	41	0
Wehen Wiesbaden	Total		210	0	4	0	—		2	0	216	0
Hansa Rostock	2019–20	3. Liga	38	0	1	0	—		—		39	0
Hansa Rostock	2020–21	3. Liga	38	0	1	0	—		—		39	0
Hansa Rostock	2021–22	2. Bundesliga	34	0	3	0	—		—		37	0
Hansa Rostock	2022–23	2. Bundesliga	34	0	0	0	—		—		34	0
Hansa Rostock	2023–24	2. Bundesliga	33	0	2	0	—		—		35	0
Hansa Rostock	Total		177	0	7	0	—		—		184	0
Werder Bremen	2024–25	Bundesliga	0	0	0	0	—		—		0	0
Werder Bremen	2025–26	Bundesliga	0	0	0	0	—		—		0	0
Werder Bremen	2026–27	Bundesliga	0	0	0	0	—		—		0	0
Werder Bremen	Total		0	0	0	0	—		—		0	0
Career total			441	0	11	0	0	0	9	0	461	0

== Honours ==
Wehen Wiesbaden

- 3. Liga promotion play-offs: 2018–19

Hansa Rostock

- Mecklenburg-Vorpommern Cup: 2020
