= 2025–26 Dynamo Dresden season =

Dynamo Dresden
2025–26 season
- Manager: Thomas Stamm
- Stadium: Rudolf-Harbig-Stadion
- 2. Bundesliga: 11th
- DFB-Pokal: First round
- Top goalscorer: League: Vincent Vermeij (11); All: Vincent Vermeij (11)
- Average home league attendance: 31,037

The 2025–26 season was the 73rd season in Dynamo Dresden's history and their first season back in the second-tier 2. Bundesliga after three seasons in the 3. Liga.

== Background ==
Manager Thomas Stamm was appointed in May 2024, having previously managed SC Freiburg II. In his debut season at the club, they won promotion back to the 2. Bundesliga following a second placed finish in the 3. Liga.

== Transfers ==
Following the end of the 2024–25 season, Tom Berger, Philip Heise and Phillip Böhm left the club upon the expiry of their contracts, and loanees Jonas Sterner, Mika Baur and Andy Hoti returned to their parent clubs, though forward Christoph Daferner, who had been at the club on loan from 1. FC Nürnberg during the 2024–25 season, joined on a permanent basis for an undisclosed fee. Defender Alexander Rossipal was Dynamo Dresden's first new player, joining from 3. Liga club Hansa Rostock. On 26 June, defender Konrad Faber joined on loan from Swiss club FC St. Gallen, and defensive midfielder Kofi Amoako joined from VfL Wolfsburg. Midfielder Nils Fröling joined after the expiry of his contract with Hansa Rostock, and goalkeeper Lennart Grill joined from Bundesliga club Union Berlin. Midfielder Luca Herrmann joined from SC Paderborn for an undisclosed fee on 24 July. On 11 August, striker Vincent Vermeij joined from Fortuna Düsseldorf for an undisclosed fee.

Young forward Marlon Faß joined from TSG Hoffenheim's under-19s, though he joined Stuttgarter Kickers on loan for the season later in the window. Defender Paul Lehmann also went out on loan, and joined SC Verl on a season-long loan. On 31 July, defender Dennis Duah joined 3. Liga side Energie Cottbus on a season-long loan.

=== In ===
Date	Pos.	Player	From	Fee	Ref.
18 June 2025	FW	Marlon Faß (GER)	TSG Hoffenheim	Undisclosed	
26 June 2025	MF	Kofi Amoako (GER)	VfL Wolfsburg	Undisclosed	
1 July 2025	FW	Christoph Daferner (GER)	1. FC Nürnberg	Undisclosed	
1 July 2025	MF	Nils Fröling (SWE)	Hansa Rostock	Free transfer	
1 July 2025	DF	Alexander Rossipal (GER)	Hansa Rostock	Free transfer	
9 July 2025	GK	Lennart Grill (GER)	Union Berlin	Free transfer	
24 July 2025	MF	Luca Herrmann (GER)	SC Paderborn	Undisclosed	
11 August 2025	FW	Vincent Vermeij (NED)	Fortuna Düsseldorf	Undisclosed	

=== Loans in ===
Date from	Pos.	Player	From	Date until	Ref.
1 July 2025	DF	Konrad Faber (GER)	FC St. Gallen (SUI)	End of season	

=== Out ===
Date	Pos.	Player	To	Fee	Ref.
30 June 2025	DF	Tom Berger (GER)		Released	
30 June 2025	DF	Philip Heise (GER)	VVV-Venlo (NED)	Released	
30 June 2025	GK	Phillip Böhm (GER)	Austria Lustenau (AUT)	Released	

=== Loans out ===
Date from	Pos.	Player	To	Date until	Ref.
1 July 2025	DF	Paul Lehmann (GER)	SC Verl	End of season	
3 July 2025	FW	Marlon Faß (GER)	Stuttgarter Kickers	End of season	
31 July 2025	DF	Dennis Duah (GER)	Energie Cottbus	End of season	

== Friendly matches ==
Friendly match details
Date	Time	Opponent	Venue	Result F–A	Scorers	Attendance	Ref.
27 June 2025	18:00	FC Thüringen Weida	Away	7–0	Casar 13', 33' pen., Daferner 19', Marx 29', Kother 68', 81', Müller 85'		
28 June 2025	14:00	Kamenzer Jungs	Away	14–0	Menzel 16', 36', Kutschke 22', 31', 37', Wagner 33', Daferner 47', 59', 78', 84', Casar 64', 67', Oehmichen 55', 80'		
5 July 2025	16:00	SV Ried	Neutral (Note: Match played at DANA-Arena in Windischgarsten, Austria.)	3–1 (Note: Match comprised two 60-minute long halves.)	Casar 60', Kammerknecht 114', Menzel 120'		
13 July 2025	14:00	Slavia Prague	Away	2–4	Fröling 80', Müller 84'		
25 July 2025	14:00	SC Freiburg	Neutral (Note: Match played at Sportanlage Golm in Schruns, Austria)	3–3	Šapina 22', Meißner 70', Marx 114'	1,100	

== Competitions ==
=== 2. Bundesliga ===
==== League table ====
Pos	Team	Pld	W	D	L	GF	GA	GD	Pts
9	VfL Bochum	34	11	11	12	49	47	+2	44
10	Karlsruher SC	34	12	8	14	53	64	−11	44
11	Dynamo Dresden	34	11	8	15	54	53	+1	41
12	Holstein Kiel	34	11	8	15	44	48	−4	41
13	Arminia Bielefeld	34	10	9	15	53	51	+2	39

Source: Bundesliga
Rules for classification: 1) Points; 2) Goal difference; 3) Goals scored; 4) Head-to-head results; 5) Head-to-head away goals scored; 6) Away goals scored; 7) Play-off.
(Rules 4–6 only apply after home and away matches have been played between the tied teams.)

=== DFB-Pokal ===
Dynamo Dresden were drawn at home to Mainz 05 in the first round of the DFB-Pokal.

18 August 2025 First round	Dynamo Dresden	0–1	Mainz 05	Dresden
18:00		Report	Amiri 22'	Stadium: Rudolf-Harbig-Stadion; Attendance: 30,000; Referee: Florian Badstübner
