= Philipp Förster =

German footballer (born 1995)

Personal information
- Date of birth: 4 February 1995 (age 31)
- Place of birth: Bretten, Germany
- Height: 1.89 m (6 ft 2 in)
- Position: Midfielder

Team information
- Current team: Fortuna Düsseldorf
- Number: 10

Youth career
- –2010: Karlsruher SC
- 2010–2014: VfB Stuttgart

Senior career*
Years	Team	Apps	(Gls)
2014	Waldhof Mannheim II	2	(0)
2014–2017	Waldhof Mannheim	74	(12)
2017	1. FC Nürnberg II	4	(0)
2017	1. FC Nürnberg	0	(0)
2017–2019	SV Sandhausen	62	(9)
2017	SV Sandhausen II	3	(0)
2019–2022	VfB Stuttgart	71	(8)
2020–2022	VfB Stuttgart II	3	(4)
2022–2024	VfL Bochum	38	(3)
2024–2025	Darmstadt 98	22	(4)
2025–2026	Karlsruher SC	27	(0)
2026–	Fortuna Düsseldorf	0	(0)
- * Club domestic league appearances and goals as of 18 May 2026

Philipp Förster (born 4 February 1995) is a German professional footballer who plays as a midfielder for 3. Liga club Fortuna Düsseldorf.

After playing youth football with Karlsruher SC and VfB Stuttgart, he started his senior career in the Regionalliga Südwest with Waldhof Mannheim in 2014. He joined 2. Bundesliga side 1. FC Nürnberg in January 2017, but failed to make a first-team appearance and joined fellow 2. Bundesliga side SV Sandhausen later that year. Two years later, he signed for 2. Bundesliga side VfB Stuttgart, and won promotion to the Bundesliga in his first season at the club.

== Career ==
=== Early career ===
Förster was born in Bretten, and grew up there, where his parents ran a gardening business. He played youth football for Karlsruher SC until 2010, and later for VfB Stuttgart between 2010 and 2014.

=== Waldhof Mannheim ===
In summer 2014, Förster joined Regionalliga Südwest side Waldhof Mannheim on a one-year contract. Shortly before the start of the season, he suffered two muscle tears. He made his debut for Waldhof Mannheim on 24 September 2014 in a 1–1 draw at home to 1899 Hoffenheim II, He scored his first goals for the club on 11 October 2014 with their second and third goals of a 3–1 victory over KSV Hessen Kassel. He appeared in 22 Regionalliga Südwest matches over the course of the 2014–15 season, and scored 4 goals.

In his second season at Waldhof Mannheim, Förster played more regularly, starting 32 of their 34 Regionalliga Südwest matches, in which he scored 6 goals. They finished top of the Regionalliga Südwest after amassing 73 points and qualified for the promotion play-offs. He played in both legs of the promotion play-off against Sportfreunde Lotte as Waldhof Mannheim lost 2–0 on aggregate and failed to achieve promotion to the 3. Liga.

The 2016–17 season saw Förster score twice in 20 appearances for Waldhof. His last appearance for the club came on 13 December 2016 in which he scored as the club defeated FC Homburg 3–2 away from home.

=== 1. FC Nürnberg ===
On 31 January 2017, Förster joined 2. Bundesliga side 1. FC Nürnberg for an undisclosed fee. After suffering multiple injuries during his spell at the club, he amassed no first team appearances and just four reserve team appearances. He was released by 1. FC Nürnberg on 17 August 2017 to allow him to join SV Sandhausen in his native Baden-Württemberg.

=== SV Sandhausen ===
On 17 August 2017, Förster joined fellow 2. Bundesliga side SV Sandhausen on a three-year contract with the option for a further year. He made his debut for the club as a second-half substitute in a 2–1 defeat at home to Fortuna Düsseldorf on 27 August 2017. He scored his first goal for the club on 16 February 2018 in 1–0 away victory over 1. FC Kaiserslautern; he scored from 16 metres in the 79th minute despite slipping as he took the shot. He made 28 appearances and scored three goals for Sandhausen in the 2017–18 season.

The 2018–19 season saw Förster start 29 of Sandhausen 34 2. Bundesliga matches, in which he scored five goals. The first of his five goals came in a 2–1 defeat at home to 1. FC Heidenheim on 2 December 2018 and he scored a brace for the club on 16 March 2019 in a 4–0 victory over FC St. Pauli. On 24 July 2019, he signed a two-year contract extension with Sandhausen, keeping him at the club until summer 2022. He appeared five times and scored once with Sandhausen in the 2019–20 season before joining VfB Stuttgart.

=== VfB Stuttgart ===
On 2 September 2019, Förster signed a four-year deal with VfB Stuttgart for a fee estimated to be around €3,000,000. After making his debut for the club on 14 September 2019 in a 3–2 victory over Jahn Regensburg, he scored his first goal for the club on 21 September 2019 in a 2–0 victory at home to Greuther Fürth. He appeared in 26 league matches and scored 3 goals for Stuttgart across the 2019–20 season, as they finished second and were promoted to the Bundesliga.

After suffering an ankle injury during the build-up to the 2020–21 season, Förster made his Bundesliga debut as a substitute in second-half stoppage time of a 1–1 draw with Schalke 04 on 30 October 2020. He made his first Bundesliga start on 28 November 2019 as a replacement for the injured Daniel Didavi in a 3–1 defeat to Bayern Munich.

=== Bochum ===
On 1 July 2022, Förster joined VfL Bochum on a two-year contract. Förster left Bochum at the end of the 2023–24 season.

=== Darmstadt 98 ===
On 23 September 2024, Förster joined 2. Bundesliga club Darmstadt 98.

=== Return to Karlsruher SC ===
On 27 August 2025, Förster signed with his childhood club Karlsruher SC.

== Career statistics ==
As of match played 6 December 2020

Appearances and goals by club, season and competition
Club	Season	League			DFB-Pokal		Other		Total	
Club	Season	Division	Apps	Goals	Apps	Goals	Apps	Goals	Apps	Goals
Waldhof Mannheim	2014–15	Regionalliga Südwest	22	4	—		0	0	22	4
Waldhof Mannheim	2015–16	Regionalliga Südwest	32	6	—		2 (Note: Appearance(s) in Regionalliga promotion play-offs)	0	34	6
Waldhof Mannheim	2016–17	Regionalliga Südwest	20	2	—		0	0	20	2
Waldhof Mannheim	Total		74	12	0	0	2	0	76	12
Waldhof Mannheim II	2014–15	Verbandsliga Nordbaden	2	0	—		0	0	2	0
1. FC Nürnberg II	2016–17	Regionalliga Bayern	4	0	—		0	0	4	0
SV Sandhausen	2017–18	2. Bundesliga	28	3	0	0	0	0	28	3
SV Sandhausen	2018–19	2. Bundesliga	29	5	2	1	0	0	31	6
SV Sandhausen	2019–20	2. Bundesliga	5	1	1	0	0	0	6	1
SV Sandhausen	Total		62	9	3	1	0	0	65	10
SV Sandhausen II	2017–18	Oberliga Baden-Württemberg	3	0	—		0	0	3	0
VfB Stuttgart	2019–20	2. Bundesliga	26	3	2	0	0	0	28	3
VfB Stuttgart	2020–21	Bundesliga	4	0	0	0	0	0	4	0
VfB Stuttgart	Total		30	3	2	0	0	0	32	3
VfB Stuttgart II	2020–21	Regionalliga Südwest	2	3	—		0	0	2	3
Career total			177	27	5	1	2	0	184	28
