= Lennart Grill =

German footballer

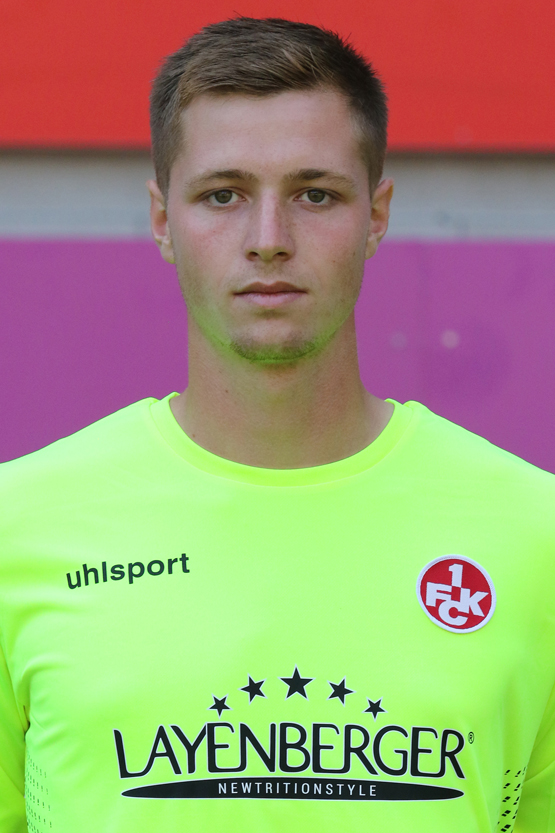
- Grill with 1. FC Kaiserslautern in 2018

Personal information
- Date of birth: 25 January 1999 (age 27)
- Place of birth: Idar-Oberstein, Germany
- Height: 1.92 m (6 ft 4 in)
- Position: Goalkeeper

Team information
- Current team: Dynamo Dresden
- Number: 22

Youth career
- SC Idar-Oberstein
- –2013: SpVgg Nahbollenbach
- 2013–2016: Mainz 05
- 2016–2018: 1. FC Kaiserslautern

Senior career*
Years	Team	Apps	(Gls)
2016–2018	1. FC Kaiserslautern II	15	(0)
2018–2020	1. FC Kaiserslautern	51	(0)
2020–2023	Bayer Leverkusen	5	(0)
2021–2022	→ SK Brann (loan)	13	(0)
2022–2023	→ Union Berlin (loan)	5	(0)
2023–2025	Union Berlin	0	(0)
2023–2024	→ VfL Osnabrück (loan)	15	(0)
2024–2025	→ Eintracht Braunschweig (loan)	9	(0)
2025	→ Greuther Fürth (loan)	3	(0)
2025–	Dynamo Dresden	6	(0)

International career
2014–2015	Germany U16	3	(0)
2015–2016	Germany U17	6	(0)
2017	Germany U18	2	(0)
2017	Germany U19	2	(0)
2019–2021	Germany U21	7	(0)
Medal record
UEFA European Under-21 Championship
Gold medal – first place	2021
- * Club domestic league appearances and goals as of 28 December 2025

Lennart Grill (born 25 January 1999) is a German professional footballer who plays as a goalkeeper for 2. Bundesliga club Dynamo Dresden.

== Club career ==
In January 2019, 1. FC Kaiserslautern manager Sascha Hildmann confirmed that Grill would be the starting goalkeeper for the club over Wolfgang Hesl in the second half of the 2018–19 season. He made his debut for Kaiserslautern in the 3. Liga on 26 January 2019, starting in the home match against Sonnenhof Großaspach, which finished as a 2–0 win.

=== Bayer Leverkusen ===
On 8 March 2019, it was announced that Grill would sign for Bayer Leverkusen starting from the 2020–21 Bundesliga season on a four-year deal. Grill made his debut for the team on 28 February 2021, by playing the full 90-minutes in a 1–2 home loss to SC Freiburg, when Lukáš Hrádecký continues to recover from the achilles tendon problems.

=== Union Berlin ===
On 16 June 2022, Grill moved to Union Berlin on a loan agreement, with Union reserving an option to buy. On 30 March 2023, the loan agreement was made permanent.

==== Loan to Osnabrück ====
On 10 July 2023, Grill joined VfL Osnabrück on loan.

==== Loan to Eintracht Braunschweig ====
On 4 July 2024, Grill joined 2. Bundesliga side Eintracht Braunschweig on a season-long loan deal. He started the season as the first goalkeeper, but was sent off in the 9th game of the league season against Hertha BSC, and lost his starter spot to Marko Johansson.

==== Loan to Greuther Fürth ====
On 22 January 2025, Grill moved on a new loan to Greuther Fürth, also in 2. Bundesliga.

=== Dynamo Dresden ===
On 9 July 2025, Grill signed with Dynamo Dresden in 2. Bundesliga on a permanent basis.

== International career ==
Grill was included in Germany's squad for the 2016 UEFA European Under-17 Championship in Azerbaijan. The team managed to reach the semi-finals, before losing 1–2 against Spain. Grill made his only appearance of the tournament in the match against Spain, coming on as a substitute in the 80th minute following a red card for starting goalkeeper Jan-Christoph Bartels.

== Career statistics ==
As of match played 30 November 2025

Appearances and goals by club, season and competition
Club	Season	League			Cup		Europe		Other		Total	
Club	Season	Division	Apps	Goals	Apps	Goals	Apps	Goals	Apps	Goals	Apps	Goals
1. FC Kaiserslautern	2016–17	2. Bundesliga	0	0	0	0	—		—		0	0
1. FC Kaiserslautern	2017–18	2. Bundesliga	0	0	0	0	—		—		0	0
1. FC Kaiserslautern	2018–19	3. Liga	18	0	0	0	—		—		18	0
1. FC Kaiserslautern	2019–20	3. Liga	33	0	3	0	—		—		36	0
1. FC Kaiserslautern	Total		51	0	3	0	—		—		54	0
Bayer Leverkusen	2020–21	Bundesliga	4	0	0	0	0	0	—		4	0
Bayer Leverkusen	2021–22	Bundesliga	1	0	0	0	0	0	—		1	0
Bayer Leverkusen	Total		5	0	0	0	0	0	—		5	0
SK Brann (loan)	2021	Eliteserien	13	0	1	0	—		1	0	15	0
Union Berlin (loan)	2022–23	Bundesliga	5	0	2	0	1	0	—		8	0
VfL Osnabrück (loan)	2023–24	2. Bundesliga	15	0	0	0	—		—		15	0
Eintracht Braunschweig (loan)	2024–25	2. Bundesliga	9	0	1	0	—		—		10	0
Greuther Fürth (loan)	2024–25	2. Bundesliga	3	0	—		—		—		3	0
Dynamo Dresden	2025–26	2. Bundesliga	6	0	0	0	—		—		6	0
Career total			107	0	7	0	1	0	1	0	109	0
