= Boo, Sweden =

Boo
- Location within Stockholm Location within Sweden
- Coordinates: 59°19′N 18°15′E
- Country: Sweden
- Province: Uppland
- County: Stockholm County
- Municipality: Nacka Municipality

Area
  - Total: 16.26 km^{2} (6.28 sq mi)

Population (31 December 2010)
  - Total: 24,052
  - Density: 1,479/km^{2} (3,830/sq mi)
- Time zone: UTC+1 (CET)
  - Summer (DST): UTC+2 (CEST)

Boo, sometimes referred to as Saltsjö-Boo, is a locality situated on the island of Värmdö in Sweden's Stockholm archipelago. From an administrative perspective, it is located in Nacka Municipality and Stockholm County, and has 24,052 inhabitants as of 2010.

== History ==
Boo was an independent municipality until 1970. In 1971 it was integrated into Nacka Municipality.

== Sports ==
The following sports clubs are located in Boo:

- Boo FF
- Boo HK
- Nacka TK
