= 2026–27 Rangers F.C. season =

Rangers
2026–27 season
- Chairman: Andrew Cavenagh
- Manager: Derek McInnes
- Stadium: Ibrox Stadium
- Scottish Premiership: 2nd
- Scottish Cup: Fourth round
- League Cup: Final
- Europa League: Third qualifying round
- Conference League: Play-off round
- Top goalscorer: League: Ryan Naderi (7); All: Ryan Naderi (10)
- Highest home attendance: 51,212 vs Celtic; 13 September 2026
- Lowest home attendance: 34,287 vs St Mirren; 16 August 2026
- Average home league attendance: 50,562
- Biggest win: 5–1 vs St Mirren; 16 August 2026; 4–0 vs St Johnstone; 24 October 2026
- Biggest defeat: 2–1 vs Jagiellonia Białystok; 6 August 2026; 2–1 vs Hibernian; 9 August 2026
| Home colours | Away colours | Third colours |
- All statistics correct as of 21 November 2026.

The 2026–27 season is the 147th season of competitive football by Rangers.

It is their eleventh-consecutive season in the Scottish Premiership, the top tier of Scottish professional football. They also participate in two domestic cup competitions – the Scottish Cup and the Scottish League Cup – and competed in the qualifying rounds of the UEFA Europa League and UEFA Conference League.

== Players ==
=== Squad information ===
| N | Pos. | Nat. | Name | Age | Since | App | Goals | Ends | Transfer fee | Notes |
|---|---|---|---|---|---|---|---|---|---|---|
| 1 | GK | (Croatia) | Ivor Pandur | 26 | 2026 | 20 | 0 | 2030 | £6m | |
| 2 | DF | (Scotland) | Ross McCrorie | 28 | 2026 (Note: Players second spell at the club; 1st spell 2012–2021) | 61 | 2 | 2029 | Undisclosed | |
| 4 | DF | (England) | Ben Godfrey | 28 | 2026 | 8 | 0 | 2027 | Loan | |
| 5 | DF | (Scotland) | John Souttar | 30 | 2022 | 132 | 4 | 2027 | Free | |
| 6 | MF | (England) | Dan Neil | 24 | 2026 | 18 | 3 | 2029 | Free | |
| 7 | FW | (Scotland) | Lawrence Shankland (captain) | 31 | 2026 | 10 | 4 | 2028 | Free | |
| 9 | FW | (Portugal) | Youssef Chermiti | 22 | 2025 | 44 | 15 | 2029 | £8m | |
| 10 | FW | (South Korea) | Kim Min-su | 20 | 2026 | 13 | 0 | 2029 | £8.5m | |
| 14 | MF | (Australia) | Cammy Devlin | 28 | 2026 | 9 | 0 | 2028 | Free | |
| 15 | MF | (Ecuador) | José Cifuentes | 27 | 2023 | 20 | 0 | 2027 | £1.2m | |
| 17 | MF | (Japan) | Daisuke Yokota | 26 | 2026 | 9 | 0 | 2029 | £2.75m | |
| 18 | DF | (Serbia) | Kosta Nedeljković | 20 | 2026 | 5 | 0 | 2027 | Loan | |
| 19 | FW | (Venezuela) | Kevin Kelsy | 22 | 2026 | 11 | 5 | 2030 | £9m | |
| 20 | FW | (Czech Republic) | Ryan Naderi | 23 | 2026 | 29 | 13 | 2029 | £4.7m | |
| 21 | DF | (England) | Dujon Sterling | 27 | 2023 | 105 | 3 | 2028 | Free | |
| 22 | MF | (Serbia) | Vanja Dragojević | 20 | 2026 | 8 | 1 | 2030 | £4.6m | |
| 23 | FW | (Mauritania) | Djeidi Gassama | 23 | 2025 | 75 | 10 | 2029 | £2.2m | |
| 24 | DF | (South Africa) | Olwethu Makhanya | 22 | 2026 | 18 | 1 | 2030 | £3m | |
| 25 | DF | (Belgium) | Tuur Rommens | 23 | 2026 | 20 | 1 | 2029 | £3.5m | |
| 26 | FW | (Algeria) | Badredine Bouanani | 21 | 2026 | 10 | 1 | 2027 | Loan | |
| 28 | FW | (North Macedonia) | Bojan Miovski | 27 | 2025 | 50 | 14 | 2029 | £2.6m | |
| 29 | DF | (Scotland) | James Penrice | 27 | 2026 | 15 | 1 | 2027 | Loan | |
| 31 | GK | (Scotland) | Liam Kelly | 30 | 2024 (Note: Players second spell at the club; 1st spell 2006–2018) | 16 | 0 | 2028 | Free | |
| 33 | DF | (Scotland) | Ashton Scally | 16 | 2026 | 1 | 0 | 2029 | Youth system | |
| 37 | DF | (Nigeria) | Emmanuel Fernandez | 25 | 2025 | 53 | 7 | 2029 | Undisclosed | |
| 42 | MF | (Denmark) | Tochi Chukwuani | 23 | 2026 | 31 | 4 | 2029 | £4m | |
| 43 | MF | (Belgium) | Nicolas Raskin | 25 | 2023 | 161 | 14 | 2028 | £1.75m | |
| 45 | FW | (Northern Ireland) | Ross McCausland | 23 | 2021 | 67 | 8 | 2027 | Youth system | |
| 52 | MF | (Scotland) | Findlay Curtis | 20 | 2024 | 45 | 3 | 2027 | Youth system | |

- Last updated: 21 November 2026

=== Players loaned out ===
| N | Pos. | Nat. | Name | Age | Since | App | Goals | Ends | Transfer fee | Notes |
|---|---|---|---|---|---|---|---|---|---|---|
| 8 | MF | (Scotland) | Connor Barron | 24 | 2024 | 85 | 0 | 2028 | Free | on loan at Middlesbrough |
| 11 | MF | (Norway) | Thelo Aasgaard | 24 | 2025 | 53 | 9 | 2029 | Undisclosed | on loan at Anderlecht |
| 16 | MF | (Scotland) | Lyall Cameron | 24 | 2025 | 10 | 1 | 2029 | Free | on loan at Dundee United |
| 48 | MF | (England) | Paul Nsio | 20 | 2022 | 3 | 0 | 2027 | Cross-border compensation | on loan at St Mirren |
| 49 | MF | (Scotland) | Bailey Rice | 20 | 2022 | 16 | 0 | 2027 | Undisclosed | on loan at Kilmarnock |
| 54 | GK | (Northern Ireland) | Mason Munn | 20 | 2022 | 1 | 0 | 2028 | Youth system | on loan at Dumbarton |
| 56 | FW | (England) | Zebedee Lawson | 18 | 2026 | 2 | 0 | 2028 | Cross-border compensation | on loan at Queen's Park |
| 64 | MF | (Scotland) | Aiden McCallion | 18 | 2024 | 1 | 0 | 2027 | Youth system | on loan at Queen's Park |
| 99 | FW | (Brazil) | Danilo | 27 | 2023 | 76 | 16 | 2028 | £5.6m | on loan at Botafogo |
| | MF | (Albania) | Nedim Bajrami | 27 | 2024 | 63 | 7 | 2028 | £3.4m | on loan at Al-Taawoun |
| | FW | (Colombia) | Óscar Cortés | 22 | 2024 | 21 | 1 | 2029 | £4.5m | on loan at Huracán |

- Last updated: 21 November 2026
- Source: (Note: Players who have made at least one first team appearance)

=== Transfers ===
==== In ====
===== First team =====
| No. | Pos. | Nat. | Name | Age | Moving from | Type | Transfer window | Ends | Transfer fee | Source |
|---|---|---|---|---|---|---|---|---|---|---|
| 7 | FW | (Scotland) | Lawrence Shankland | 30 | Heart of Midlothian | Transfer | Summer | 2028 | Free | |
| 2 | DF | (Scotland) | Ross McCrorie | 28 | Bristol City (England) | Transfer | Summer | 2029 | Undisclosed | |
| 4 | DF | (England) | Ben Godfrey | 28 | Atalanta (Italy) | Loan | Summer | 2027 | N/A | |
| 1 | GK | (Croatia) | Ivor Pandur | 26 | Hull City (England) | Transfer | Summer | 2030 | £6m | |
| 6 | MF | (England) | Dan Neil | 24 | Sunderland (England) | Transfer | Summer | 2029 | Free | |
| 14 | MF | (Australia) | Cammy Devlin | 28 | Heart of Midlothian | Transfer | Summer | 2028 | Free | |
| 22 | MF | (Serbia) | Vanja Dragojević | 20 | Partizan Belgrade (Serbia) | Transfer | Summer | 2030 | £4.6m | |
| 24 | DF | (South Africa) | Olwethu Makhanya | 22 | Philadelphia Union (United States) | Transfer | Summer | 2030 | £3m | |
| 17 | MF | (Japan) | Daisuke Yokota | 26 | Hannover 96 (Germany) | Transfer | Summer | 2029 | £2.75m | |
| 29 | DF | (Scotland) | James Penrice | 27 | AEK Athens (Greece) | Loan | Summer | 2027 | N/A | |
| 18 | DF | (Serbia) | Kosta Nedeljković | 20 | Aston Villa (England) | Loan | Summer | 2027 | N/A | |
| 10 | FW | (South Korea) | Kim Min-su | 20 | Girona (Spain) | Transfer | Summer | 2029 | £8.5m | |
| 19 | FW | (Venezuela) | Kevin Kelsy | 22 | Portland Timbers (United States) | Transfer | Summer | 2030 | £9m | |
| 26 | FW | (Algeria) | Badredine Bouanani | 21 | Stuttgart (Germany) | Loan | Summer | 2027 | N/A | |

===== Academy =====
| No. | Pos. | Nat. | Name | Age | Moving from | Type | Transfer window | Ends | Transfer fee | Source |

==== Out ====
===== First team =====
| No. | Pos. | Nat. | Name | Age | Moving to | Type | Transfer window | Transfer fee | Source |
|---|---|---|---|---|---|---|---|---|---|
| 2 | DF | (England) | James Tavernier | 34 | Maccabi Tel Aviv (Israel) | End of contract | Summer | Free | |
| 26 | DF | (England) | Ben Davies | 30 | Bolton Wanderers (England) | End of contract | Summer | Free | |
| 49 | MF | (Scotland) | Bailey Rice | 19 | Kilmarnock | Loan | Summer | N/A | |
| 1 | GK | (England) | Jack Butland | 33 | Hull City (England) | Transfer | Summer | £3m | |
| 38 | DF | (Scotland) | Leon King | 22 | Ayr United | End of contract | Summer | Free | |
| 99 | FW | (Brazil) | Danilo | 27 | Botafogo (Brazil) | Loan | Summer | N/A | |
| 18 | FW | (Finland) | Oliver Antman | 24 | Anderlecht (Belgium) | Transfer | Summer | £4.5m | |
| 48 | MF | (England) | Paul Nsio | 20 | St Mirren | Loan | Summer | N/A | |
| | MF | (Albania) | Nedim Bajrami | 27 | Al-Taawoun (Saudi Arabia) | Loan | Summer | N/A | |
| 10 | MF | (Ivory Coast) | Mohamed Diomande | 24 | Çorum (Turkey) | Transfer | Summer | £4.5m | |
| 32 | GK | (Scotland) | Kieran Wright | 27 | Heart of Midlothian | End of contract | Summer | Free | |
| 16 | MF | (Scotland) | Lyall Cameron | 23 | Dundee United | Loan | Summer | N/A | |
| 8 | MF | (Scotland) | Connor Barron | 24 | Middlesbrough (England) | Loan | Summer | N/A | |
| 11 | MF | (Norway) | Thelo Aasgaard | 24 | Anderlecht (Belgium) | Loan | Summer | N/A | |
| 54 | GK | (Northern Ireland) | Mason Munn | 20 | Dumbarton | Loan | Summer | N/A | |
| | DF | (France) | Clinton Nsiala | 22 | Sharjah (United Arab Emirates) | Transfer | Summer | £0.3m | |

===== Academy =====
| No. | Pos. | Nat. | Name | Age | Moving to | Type | Transfer window | Transfer fee | Source |
|---|---|---|---|---|---|---|---|---|---|
| | MF | (Northern Ireland) | Blaine McClure | 19 | Nottingham Forest (England) | Transfer | Summer | Undisclosed | |
| 64 | MF | (Scotland) | Aiden McCallion | 18 | Queen's Park | Co-operation loan | Summer | N/A | |
| 61 | MF | (Scotland) | Lewis Stewart | 19 | Queen's Park | Co-operation loan | Summer | N/A | |
| 70 | FW | (Scotland) | Max Cameron | 17 | Alloa Athletic | Co-operation loan | Summer | N/A | |
| 72 | MF | (Scotland) | Kyle Glasgow | 16 | Alloa Athletic | Co-operation loan | Summer | N/A | |
| 62 | MF | (Scotland) | Alexander Smith | 18 | East Kilbride | Loan | Summer | N/A | |
| 56 | FW | (England) | Zebedee Lawson | 17 | Queen's Park | Loan | Summer | N/A | |
| 55 | DF | (Scotland) | Jack Wyllie | 18 | Forfar Athletic | Loan | Summer | N/A | |
| 46 | MF | (Scotland) | Calum Adamson | 19 | Raith Rovers | Loan | Summer | N/A | |
| 69 | DF | (Scotland) | Oliver Hynd | 18 | Cumbernauld Colts | Loan | Summer | N/A | |
| 59 | MF | (Northern Ireland) | Callum Burnside | 19 | Airdrieonians | Loan | Summer | N/A | |
| 93 | FW | (Scotland) | Cormac Christie | 18 | Brechin City | Loan | Summer | N/A | |
| 47 | FW | (Wales) | Josh Gentles | 18 | Airdrieonians | Loan | Summer | N/A | |
| 68 | MF | (Scotland) | Aiden Crilly | 17 | Alloa Athletic | Co-operation loan | Summer | N/A | |
| 60 | DF | (Scotland) | Lyle Wark | 19 | Auchinleck Talbot | Loan | Summer | N/A | |
| 41 | DF | (Scotland) | Zander Hutton | 20 | Queen of the South | Loan | Summer | N/A | |
| 50 | GK | (Scotland) | Greig Thackray | 19 | Auchinleck Talbot | Loan | Summer | N/A | |

==== New contracts ====
===== First team =====
| N | P | Nat. | Name | Age | Date signed | Contract length | Expiry date | Source |
|---|---|---|---|---|---|---|---|---|
| 31 | GK | (Scotland) | Liam Kelly | 30 | 9 June | 2 years | May 2028 | |
| 49 | MF | (Scotland) | Bailey Rice | 19 | 22 June | 1 year | May 2027 | |

===== Academy =====
| N | P | Nat. | Name | Age | Date signed | Contract length | Expiry date | Source |
|---|---|---|---|---|---|---|---|---|
| 75 | MF | (Scotland) | Luca Rankin | 16 | 6 July | 3 years | May 2029 | |
| 61 | MF | (Scotland) | Lewis Stewart | 19 | 7 July | 1 year | May 2027 | |
| 71 | MF | (Scotland) | Coben Fergusson | 16 | 8 July | 3 years | May 2029 | |
| | DF | (Scotland) | Corey Ngwenya | 15 | 9 July | 3 years | May 2029 | |
| 73 | FW | (Scotland) | Ruaridh Hall | 16 | 10 July | 3 years | May 2029 | |
| 51 | GK | (Scotland) | Rydnn McGuire | 17 | 17 August | 3 years | May 2029 | |

== Pre-season and friendlies ==
| 4 July 2026 Friendly | Rangers | 5–1 | Raith Rovers | Milngavie, Scotland |
| | Cameron; Rommens; McCrorie; Bajrami; Naderi | Report | (pen.) | Stadium: Rangers Training Centre; Attendance: N/A |
Note: The match was played behind closed doors.

| 8 July 2026 Friendly | Rangers | 3–1 | Dunfermline Athletic | Milngavie, Scotland |
| | Miovski; Naderi; Diomande | Report | Goal | Stadium: Rangers Training Centre; Attendance: N/A |
Note: The match was played behind closed doors.

| 12 July 2026 Friendly | Kaizer Chiefs | 1–1 | Rangers | La Nucia, Spain |
| 19:00 CEST (UTC+2) | Ighodaro 77' | Report | Curtis 89' | Stadium: Estadi Olímpic Camilo Cano; Attendance: N/A |
Note: The match was played behind closed doors.

| 16 July 2026 Friendly | Johor Darul Ta'zim | 2–2 | Rangers | La Nucia, Spain |
| 19:00 CEST (UTC+2) | Bérgson 46', 49' | Report | Chukwuani 60', 65' | Stadium: Estadi Olímpic Camilo Cano; Attendance: N/A |
Note: The match was played behind closed doors.

| 22 July 2026 Friendly | Rangers | 2–1 | Saint-Étienne | Glasgow, Scotland |
| 19:45 BST (UTC+1) | Shankland 5' (pen.); Aasgaard 84' (pen.) | Report | Breum 38'; Bernauer (yellow card) 56' | Stadium: Ibrox Stadium; Attendance: 24,818; Referee: Duncan Nicolson |

| 26 July 2026 Friendly | Rangers | 0–0 | West Ham United | Glasgow, Scotland |
| 16:00 BST (UTC+1) | | Report | | Stadium: Ibrox Stadium; Attendance: 48,178; Referee: Don Robertson |

| 3 August 2026 Friendly | Rangers | 6–2 | Partick Thistle | Milngavie, Scotland |
| | Naderi,, Miovski; Rankin; Wark | Report | Goal | Stadium: Rangers Training Centre; Attendance: N/A |
Note: The match was played behind closed doors.

== Competitions ==
Win Draw Loss Postponed

=== Overall ===
| Competition | First match | Last match | Starting round | Final position | Record | | | | | | | |
| Competition | First match | Last match | Starting round | Final position | Pld | W | D | L | GF | GA | GD | Win % |
|---|---|---|---|---|---|---|---|---|---|---|---|---|
| Scottish Premiership | 31 July 2026 | | Matchday 1 | | 13 | 9 | 3 | 1 | 23 | 10 | +13 | 69.23 |
| Scottish Cup | 16 January 2027 | | Fourth round | | 0 | 0 | 0 | 0 | 0 | 0 | +0 | — |
| Scottish League Cup | 16 August 2026 | 13 December 2026 | Second round | | 3 | 3 | 0 | 0 | 9 | 1 | +8 | 100.00 |
| UEFA Europa League | 6 August 2026 | 13 August 2026 | Third qualifying round | Third qualifying round | 2 | 0 | 1 | 1 | 2 | 3 | −1 | 0.00 |
| UEFA Conference League | 20 August 2026 | 27 August 2026 | Play-off round | Play-off round | 2 | 1 | 0 | 1 | 1 | 1 | +0 | 50.00 |
| Total | | | | | 20 | 13 | 4 | 3 | 35 | 15 | +20 | 65.00 |

Last updated: 21 November 2026
Source: Competitions

=== Scottish Premiership ===
==== League table ====
| Pos | Team | Pld | W | D | L | GF | GA | GD | Pts | Qualification or relegation (Note: Teams play each other three times (33 matches), before the league is split into two groups (the top six and the bottom six).) |
|---|---|---|---|---|---|---|---|---|---|---|
| 1 | Celtic | 14 | 11 | 1 | 2 | 32 | 11 | +21 | 34 | Qualification for the Champions League second qualifying round |
| 2 | Rangers | 13 | 9 | 3 | 1 | 23 | 10 | +13 | 30 | Qualification for the Conference League second qualifying round (Note: The winners of the 2026–27 Scottish Cup will qualify for the Europa League. If the cup winners also win the league, the spot reserved for the cup winners (Europa League first qualifying round) will pass to the second-placed team, and the spots for the Conference League second qualifying round will move down one league position.) |
| 3 | Falkirk | 14 | 7 | 3 | 4 | 22 | 15 | +7 | 24 | Qualification for the Conference League second qualifying round |
| 4 | Heart of Midlothian | 13 | 7 | 2 | 4 | 34 | 22 | +12 | 23 | |
| 5 | Dundee United | 13 | 5 | 5 | 3 | 21 | 17 | +4 | 20 | |

Updated to match(es) played on 21 November 2026. Source:
Rules for classification: 1) Points; 2) Goal difference; 3) Goals scored; 4) Head-to-head points; 5) Head-to-head goal difference; 6) Play-off (only if deciding champion, UEFA competition qualification, second stage group allocation, or relegation).

==== Results by round ====
| Round | 1 | 2 | 4 | 5 | 6 | 3^{1} | 7 | 8 | 9 | 10 | 11 | 12 | 13 | 14 | 15 | 16 | 17 | 18 | 19 | 20 | 21 | 22 | 23 | 24 | 25 | 26 | 27 | 28 | 29 | 30 | 31 | 32 | 33 | 34 | 35 | 36 | 37 | 38 |
|---|---|---|---|---|---|---|---|---|---|---|---|---|---|---|---|---|---|---|---|---|---|---|---|---|---|---|---|---|---|---|---|---|---|---|---|---|---|---|
| Ground | A | H | A | A | H | H | A | H | A | H | A | A | A | | | | | | | | | | | | | | | | | | | | | | | | | |
| Result | D | L | W | W | W | W | W | W | D | W | D | W | W | | | | | | | | | | | | | | | | | | | | | | | | | |
| Position | 7 | 9 | 7 | 6 | 4 | 2 | 2 | 2 | 2 | 2 | 2 | 2 | 2 | | | | | | | | | | | | | | | | | | | | | | | | | |
| Points | 1 | 1 | 4 | 7 | 10 | 13 | 16 | 19 | 20 | 23 | 24 | 27 | 30 | | | | | | | | | | | | | | | | | | | | | | | | | |

Updated to match(es) played on 21 November 2026. Source: Competition Match Reports
A = Away; H = Home; W = Win; D = Draw; L = Loss
Notes:
- ^{1} Matchday 3 (vs St Mirren) was rescheduled due to Rangers' participation in the UEFA Conference League.

==== Matches ====
| 31 July 2026 1 | Dundee United | 1–1 | Rangers | Dundee |
| 20:00 BST | Rose 38'; Ševelj (yellow card) 55' | Report | Neil (yellow card) 47'; Aasgaard 56'; Sterling (yellow card) 78'; McCrorie (yellow card) 81' | Stadium: Tannadice Park; Attendance: 13,465; Referee: Nick Walsh |

| 9 August 2026 2 | Rangers | 1–2 | Hibernian | Glasgow |
| 16:00 BST | Dragojević (yellow card) 11'; Chaiwa 85' (o.g.) | Report | Campbell 12' (pen.); Šuto (yellow card) 46'; Wright 90+3' | Stadium: Ibrox Stadium; Attendance: 50,893; Referee: Don Robertson |

| 30 August 2026 4 | Aberdeen | 0–1 | Rangers | Aberdeen |
| 12:00 BST | Happe (yellow card) 4'; Cadden (yellow card) 36'; Ronan (yellow card) 43'; Aremu (yellow card) 44'; Olusanya (yellow card) 55'; Mayo (yellow card) 77' | Report | Curtis (yellow card) 37'; Devlin (yellow card) 49'; Sterling (yellow card) 65'; Shankland 69' (pen.) | Stadium: Pittodrie Stadium; Attendance: 18,343; Referee: Matthew MacDermid |

| 2 September 2026 5 | Falkirk | 1–2 | Rangers | Falkirk |
| 20:00 BST | Nedeljković 44' (o.g.); Ross (yellow card) 53'; Spencer (yellow card) 67' | Report | Shankland 8', 79'; Makhanya (yellow card) 76' | Stadium: Falkirk Stadium; Attendance: 6,847; Referee: Steven McLean |

| 5 September 2026 6 | Rangers | 1–0 | Motherwell | Glasgow |
| 15:00 BST | Naderi 12'; Kim (penalty missed) 29' | Report | | Stadium: Ibrox Stadium; Attendance: 50,868; Referee: Duncan Nicolson |

| 9 September 2026 3 | Rangers | 1–0 | St Mirren | Glasgow |
| 19:45 BST | Sterling (yellow card) 62'; Miovski 90+1' | Report | Ramsay (yellow card) 55' | Stadium: Ibrox Stadium; Attendance: 50,336; Referee: Don Robertson |
Note: The fixture was rescheduled from 23 August 2026 due to Rangers' participation in the UEFA Conference League play-offs.

| 20 September 2026 7 | Celtic | 0–1 | Rangers | Glasgow |
| 12:00 BST | McGregor (yellow card) 73'; Tounekti (yellow card) 74' | Report | Fernandez (yellow card) 4'; Naderi 33'; Kim (yellow card) 57'; Bouanani (yellow card) 88' | Stadium: Celtic Park; Attendance: 59,650; Referee: John Beaton |

| 10 October 2026 8 | Rangers | 3–1 | Kilmarnock | Glasgow |
| 15:00 BST | Naderi 15', 44'; Kelsy 24'; Nedeljković (yellow card) 64' | Report | Schjønning-Larsen (yellow card) 49'; Cleșcenco 90' | Stadium: Ibrox Stadium; Attendance: 50,501; Referee: Matthew MacDermid |

| 17 October 2026 9 | Dundee | 2–2 | Rangers | Dundee |
| 20:00 BST | Fink 37'; Hamilton (yellow card) 68'; Jones 69'; Hay (yellow card) 77' | Report | Bouanani 42'; Raskin 60', (yellow card) 84'; Sterling (yellow card) 77' | Stadium: Dens Park; Attendance: 9,048; Referee: Duncan Nicolson |

| 24 October 2026 10 | Rangers | 4–0 | St Johnstone | Glasgow |
| 15:00 BST | Kelsy 29', 66'; Naderi 61'; Chukwuani 87'; Bouanani (yellow card) 90+2' | Report | Fotheringham (red card) 74'; Steven (yellow card) 90+2' | Stadium: Ibrox Stadium; Attendance: 50,214; Referee: Chris Graham |

| 28 October 2026 11 | Heart of Midlothian | 2–2 | Rangers | Edinburgh |
| 20:00 GMT | Braga 48'; Miller 57'; Altena (yellow card) 72'; Kerjota (yellow card) 87' | Report | Raskin (yellow card) 4'; Kelsy 16'; Fernandez (yellow card) 44'; Penrice (yellow card) 61'; Bouanani (yellow card) 70'; Makhanya 89' | Stadium: Tynecastle Park; Attendance: 18,692; Referee: Don Robertson |

| 7 November 2026 12 | St Mirren | 0–2 | Rangers | Paisley |
| 20:00 GMT | Ramsay (yellow card) 3'; Taylor (yellow card) 23'; Donnelly (yellow card) 69' | Report | Naderi 18' (pen.); Kim (yellow card) 56'; Raskin (yellow card) 60'; Neil 61' | Stadium: St Mirren Park; Attendance: 6,795; Referee: Nick Walsh |

| 21 November 2026 13 | Motherwell | 1–2 | Rangers | Motherwell |
| 20:00 GMT | Girdwood-Reich 21'; Hendry (yellow card) 68' | Report | Fernandez 8'; Naderi 88', (yellow card) 90' | Stadium: Fir Park; Referee: Don Robertson |

=== Scottish League Cup ===
| 16 August 2026 Second round | Rangers | 5–1 | St Mirren | Glasgow |
| 16:00 BST | Naderi 9'; Dragojević 18'; Fernandez (yellow card) 20'; Gassama 52'; Penrice 54'; McCausland (yellow card) 71', (goal) 74' | Report | Fraser (yellow card) 12'; Mochrie 30'; Phillips (penalty missed) 68' | Stadium: Ibrox Stadium; Attendance: 34,287; Referee: John Beaton |

| 13 September 2026 Quarter-final | Rangers | 3–0 | Celtic | Glasgow |
| 12:00 BST | Neil 23', 75'; Makhanya (yellow card) 48'; Kelsy 59'; Penrice (yellow card) 78' | Report | Nygren (yellow card) 19'; Donovan (yellow card) 27'; Hassan (yellow card) 79' | Stadium: Ibrox Stadium; Attendance: 51,212; Referee: Nick Walsh |

| 31 October 2026 Semi-final | Rangers | 1–0 | Aberdeen | Glasgow |
| 17:30 GMT | Sterling (yellow card) 41'; Naderi 83' | Report | Aremu (yellow card) 36'; Devlin (yellow card) 86' | Stadium: Hampden Park; Attendance: 43,567; Referee: Ryan Lee |

| 13 December 2026 Final | Hibernian | v | Rangers | Glasgow |
| 15:00 GMT | | | | Stadium: Hampden Park |

=== UEFA Europa League ===
==== Third qualifying round ====
| 6 August 2026 First leg | Jagiellonia Białystok (Poland) | 2–1 | (Scotland) Rangers | Białystok, Poland |
| 18:00 CEST (UTC+2) | Fernandez 13' (o.g.); Szmyt 21'; Kobayashi (yellow card) 88' | Report | Montóia 4' (o.g.); Rommens (yellow card) 5'; Chukwuani (yellow card) 34'; Raskin (yellow card) 90+2' | Stadium: Stadion Miejski; Attendance: 19,931; Referee: Nikola Dabanović (Montenegro) |

| 13 August 2026 Second leg | Rangers (Scotland) | 1–1 (2–3 agg.) | (Poland) Jagiellonia Białystok | Glasgow, Scotland |
| 19:30 BST (UTC+1) | Shankland 19' (pen.); Dragojević (yellow card) 73' | Report | Romanczuk (yellow card) 46'; Vital (yellow card) 63'; Prelec 65'; Klynge (yellow card) 70' | Stadium: Ibrox Stadium; Attendance: 41,636; Referee: Vassilis Fotias (Greece) |

=== UEFA Conference League ===
==== Play-off round ====
| 20 August 2026 First leg | Rangers (Scotland) | 1–0 | (Czech Republic) Jablonec | Glasgow, Scotland |
| 19:45 BST (UTC+1) | Fernandez (yellow card) 11'; Naderi 50'; Neil (yellow card) 65'; Devlin (red card) 74' | Report | Ahl (yellow card) 89'; Sedláček (yellow card) 90+1' | Stadium: Ibrox Stadium; Attendance: 34,701; Referee: Marian Barbu (Romania) |

| 27 August 2026 Second leg | Jablonec (Czech Republic) | 1–0 (a.e.t.) (1–1 agg.) (4–3 p) | (Scotland) Rangers | Jablonec nad Nisou, Czech Republic |
| 18:00 CEST (UTC+2) | Cedidla (yellow card) 17'; Chanturishvili 73'; Růsek (yellow card) 101' | Report | Shankland (yellow card) 112' | Stadium: Stadion Střelnice; Attendance: 5,563; Referee: Nenad Minaković (Serbia) |
| | Penalties |
| | Růsek (penalty scored); Sedláček (penalty scored); Zorvan (penalty missed); Okeke (penalty scored); Chramosta (penalty scored) | | (penalty scored) Shankland; (penalty scored) Miovski; (penalty scored) Aasgaard; (penalty missed) Curtis; (penalty missed) Penrice |

== Club ==
=== First team staff ===
| Name | Role |
|---|---|
| Manager | (Scotland) Derek McInnes |
| Assistant managers | (Scotland) Alan Archibald (Scotland) Paul Sheerin |
| First team coach | (Scotland) Craig Clark |
| Goalkeeping coach | (Scotland) Allan McGregor |

=== Awards ===
| N | P | Nat. | Name | Award | Date | From | Source |
|---|---|---|---|---|---|---|---|
| | MAN | (Scotland) | Derek McInnes | Premiership Manager of the Month | September | Scottish Professional Football League | |
| 24 | DF | (South Africa) | Olwethu Makhanya | Premiership Player of the Month | September | Scottish Professional Football League | |

== Squad statistics ==
The table below includes all players registered with the SPFL as part of the Rangers squad for the 2026–27 season. They may not have made an appearance.

=== Appearances and goals ===
| No. | Pos. | Nat. | Name | Totals | | Scottish Premiership | | Scottish Cup | | League Cup | | Europa League | | Conference League | |
| No. | Pos. | Nat. | Name | Apps | Goals | Apps | Goals | Apps | Goals | Apps | Goals | Apps | Goals | Apps | Goals |
Goalkeepers
| 1 | GK | (Croatia) CRO | Ivor Pandur | 20 | 0 | 13 | 0 | 0 | 0 | 3 | 0 | 2 | 0 | 2 | 0 |
| 31 | GK | (Scotland) SCO | Liam Kelly | 0 | 0 | 0 | 0 | 0 | 0 | 0 | 0 | 0 | 0 | 0 | 0 |
Defenders
| 2 | DF | (Scotland) SCO | Ross McCrorie | 6 | 0 | 0+3 | 0 | 0 | 0 | 0+1 | 0 | 1+1 | 0 | 0 | 0 |
| 4 | DF | (England) ENG | Ben Godfrey | 8 | 0 | 1+5 | 0 | 0 | 0 | 0+2 | 0 | 0 | 0 | 0 | 0 |
| 5 | DF | (Scotland) SCO | John Souttar | 0 | 0 | 0 | 0 | 0 | 0 | 0 | 0 | 0 | 0 | 0 | 0 |
| 18 | DF | (Serbia) SRB | Kosta Nedeljković | 5 | 0 | 1+2 | 0 | 0 | 0 | 0 | 0 | 0 | 0 | 0+2 | 0 |
| 21 | DF | (England) ENG | Dujon Sterling | 18 | 0 | 11 | 0 | 0 | 0 | 3 | 0 | 2 | 0 | 2 | 0 |
| 24 | DF | (South Africa) RSA | Olwethu Makhanya | 18 | 1 | 12 | 1 | 0 | 0 | 3 | 0 | 1 | 0 | 2 | 0 |
| 25 | DF | (Belgium) BEL | Tuur Rommens | 8 | 0 | 3+3 | 0 | 0 | 0 | 1 | 0 | 1 | 0 | 0 | 0 |
| 29 | DF | (Scotland) SCO | James Penrice | 15 | 1 | 10 | 0 | 0 | 0 | 3 | 1 | 0 | 0 | 2 | 0 |
| 33 | DF | (Scotland) SCO | Ashton Scally | 0 | 0 | 0 | 0 | 0 | 0 | 0 | 0 | 0 | 0 | 0 | 0 |
| 37 | DF | (Nigeria) NGR | Emmanuel Fernandez | 20 | 1 | 13 | 1 | 0 | 0 | 3 | 0 | 2 | 0 | 2 | 0 |
Midfielders
| 6 | MF | (England) ENG | Dan Neil (vice-captain) | 18 | 3 | 10+1 | 1 | 0 | 0 | 1+2 | 2 | 2 | 0 | 2 | 0 |
| 14 | MF | (Australia) AUS | Cammy Devlin | 9 | 0 | 4+2 | 0 | 0 | 0 | 0 | 0 | 0+2 | 0 | 0+1 | 0 |
| 15 | MF | (Ecuador) ECU | José Cifuentes | 0 | 0 | 0 | 0 | 0 | 0 | 0 | 0 | 0 | 0 | 0 | 0 |
| 17 | MF | (Japan) JPN | Daisuke Yokota | 9 | 0 | 1+3 | 0 | 0 | 0 | 1 | 0 | 2 | 0 | 2 | 0 |
| 22 | MF | (Serbia) SRB | Vanja Dragojević | 8 | 1 | 1+1 | 0 | 0 | 0 | 1+1 | 1 | 0+2 | 0 | 2 | 0 |
| 42 | MF | (Denmark) DEN | Tochi Chukwuani | 13 | 1 | 0+8 | 1 | 0 | 0 | 1+1 | 0 | 1 | 0 | 2 | 0 |
| 43 | MF | (Belgium) BEL | Nicolas Raskin | 16 | 1 | 11 | 1 | 0 | 0 | 3 | 0 | 1+1 | 0 | 0 | 0 |
| 52 | MF | (Scotland) SCO | Findlay Curtis | 19 | 0 | 4+8 | 0 | 0 | 0 | 0+3 | 0 | 0+2 | 0 | 0+2 | 0 |
Forwards
| 7 | FW | (Scotland) SCO | Lawrence Shankland (captain) | 10 | 4 | 5 | 3 | 0 | 0 | 0+1 | 0 | 1+1 | 1 | 0+2 | 0 |
| 9 | FW | (Portugal) POR | Youssef Chermiti | 3 | 0 | 1+1 | 0 | 0 | 0 | 0 | 0 | 1 | 0 | 0 | 0 |
| 10 | FW | (South Korea) KOR | Kim Min-su | 13 | 0 | 10+1 | 0 | 0 | 0 | 2 | 0 | 0 | 0 | 0 | 0 |
| 19 | FW | (Venezuela) VEN | Kevin Kelsy | 11 | 5 | 6+3 | 4 | 0 | 0 | 2 | 1 | 0 | 0 | 0 | 0 |
| 20 | FW | (Czech Republic) CZE | Ryan Naderi | 18 | 10 | 9+3 | 7 | 0 | 0 | 3 | 2 | 1 | 0 | 2 | 1 |
| 23 | FW | (Mauritania) MTN | Djeidi Gassama | 19 | 1 | 10+3 | 0 | 0 | 0 | 2+1 | 1 | 1 | 0 | 2 | 0 |
| 26 | FW | (Algeria) ALG | Badredine Bouanani | 10 | 1 | 5+3 | 1 | 0 | 0 | 1+1 | 0 | 0 | 0 | 0 | 0 |
| 28 | FW | (North Macedonia) MKD | Bojan Miovski | 8 | 1 | 0+5 | 1 | 0 | 0 | 0+1 | 0 | 0+1 | 0 | 0+1 | 0 |
| 45 | FW | (Northern Ireland) NIR | Ross McCausland | 1 | 1 | 0 | 0 | 0 | 0 | 0+1 | 1 | 0 | 0 | 0 | 0 |
Players transferred or loaned out during the season who made an appearance
| 8 | MF | (Scotland) SCO | Connor Barron | 2 | 0 | 0 | 0 | 0 | 0 | 0 | 0 | 0 | 0 | 0+2 | 0 |
| 10 | MF | (Ivory Coast) CIV | Mohamed Diomande | 3 | 0 | 1+1 | 0 | 0 | 0 | 0 | 0 | 1 | 0 | 0 | 0 |
| 11 | MF | (Norway) NOR | Thelo Aasgaard | 5 | 1 | 1+1 | 1 | 0 | 0 | 0 | 0 | 2 | 0 | 0+1 | 0 |

- Last updated: 21 November 2026

Appearances (starts and substitute appearances) and goals include those in Scottish Premiership, Scottish Cup, Scottish League Cup and UEFA Conference League.

=== Discipline ===
==== Yellow cards ====
As of match played on 21 November 2026

| Colour | Player | Cards |
|---|---|---|
Yellow card
| Yellow card | Dujon Sterling | 5 |
| Yellow card | Emmanuel Fernandez | 4 |
| Yellow card | Nicolas Raskin | 4 |
| Yellow card | Badredine Bouanani | 3 |
| Yellow card | Vanja Dragojević | 2 |
| Yellow card | Kim Min-su | 2 |
| Yellow card | Olwethu Makhanya | 2 |
| Yellow card | Dan Neil | 2 |
| Yellow card | James Penrice | 2 |
| Yellow card | Tochi Chukwuani | 1 |
| Yellow card | Findlay Curtis | 1 |
| Yellow card | Cammy Devlin | 1 |
| Yellow card | Ross McCausland | 1 |
| Yellow card | Ross McCrorie | 1 |
| Yellow card | Ryan Naderi | 1 |
| Yellow card | Kosta Nedeljković | 1 |
| Yellow card | Tuur Rommens | 1 |
| Yellow card | Lawrence Shankland | 1 |

==== Red cards ====
As of match played on 21 November 2026

| Colour | Player | Cards |
|---|---|---|
Red card
| Red card | Cammy Devlin | 1 |

=== Clean sheets ===
As of match played on 21 November 2026

| No. | Player | Scottish Premiership | Scottish Cup | League Cup | Europa League | Conference League | Total | Appearances |
|---|---|---|---|---|---|---|---|---|
| 1 | Ivor Pandur | 6 | 0 | 2 | 0 | 1 | 9 | 20 |
| 31 | Liam Kelly | 0 | 0 | 0 | 0 | 0 | 0 | 0 |
| Total | | 6 | 0 | 2 | 0 | 1 | 9 | 20 |
