= Marco Schuster =

German footballer

Personal information
- Date of birth: 10 October 1995 (age 31)
- Place of birth: Rögling, Germany
- Height: 1.79 m (5 ft 10 in)
- Position: Midfielder

Team information
- Current team: Hansa Rostock
- Number: 5

Youth career
- BC Blossenau
- –2008: TSV Nördlingen
- 2008–2014: FC Augsburg

Senior career*
Years	Team	Apps	(Gls)
2014–2017	FC Augsburg II	64	(4)
2014–2017	FC Augsburg	0	(0)
2017–2021	Waldhof Mannheim	100	(7)
2021–2024	SC Paderborn	64	(0)
2024–	Hansa Rostock	72	(4)
- * Club domestic league appearances and goals as of 28 May 2026

Marco Schuster (born 10 October 1995) is a German professional footballer who plays as a midfielder for 3. Liga club Hansa Rostock.

== Career ==
Schuster made his debut in the 3. Liga for Waldhof Mannheim on 21 July 2019, starting in the home match against Chemnitzer FC, which finished as a 1–1 draw.

On 8 July 2024, Schuster moved to Hansa Rostock in 3. Liga.
