= Jonas Dirkner =

German footballer

Personal information
- Full name: Jonas Michel Dirkner
- Date of birth: 15 July 2002 (age 24)
- Place of birth: Rostock, Germany
- Height: 1.81 m (5 ft 11 in)
- Position: Midfielder

Team information
- Current team: Hansa Rostock
- Number: 6

Youth career
- Hansa Rostock
- 2017–2020: Hertha BSC

Senior career*
Years	Team	Apps	(Gls)
2019–2022	Hertha BSC II	34	(0)
2021–2022	Hertha BSC	1	(0)
2022–2024	VSG Altglienicke	51	(1)
2024–	Hansa Rostock	45	(3)

International career^{‡}
2019	Germany U18	1	(0)
2020	Germany U19	2	(0)
- * Club domestic league appearances and goals as of 28 May 2026 ‡ National team caps and goals as of 15:08, 22 May 2021 (UTC)

Jonas Michel Dirkner (born 15 July 2002) is a German professional footballer who plays as a midfielder for 3. Liga club Hansa Rostock.

== Career ==
Dirkner joined Hertha BSC at under-15 level after playing for Hansa Rostock.

On 15 June 2024, Dirkner returned to his childhood club Hansa Rostock.
