= Rick Wulle =

German footballer

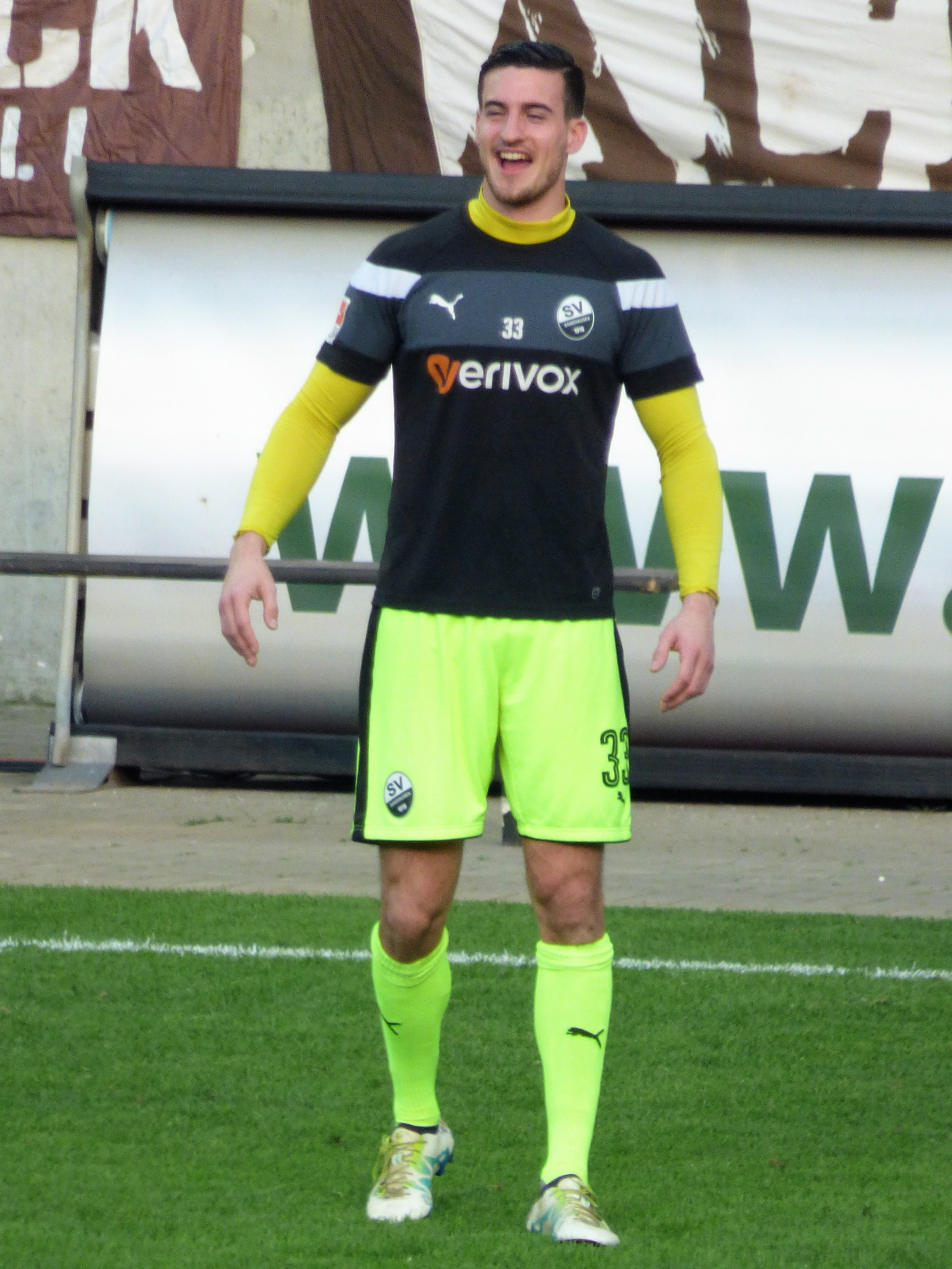
- Wulle warming up for SV Sandhausen in 2017

Personal information
- Date of birth: 4 June 1994 (age 32)
- Place of birth: Heidelberg, Germany
- Height: 1.88 m (6 ft 2 in)
- Position: Goalkeeper

Youth career
- 2011–2013: FC Astoria Walldorf

Senior career*
Years	Team	Apps	(Gls)
2013–2015	FC Astoria Walldorf	33	(0)
2015–2022	SV Sandhausen	9	(0)
- * Club domestic league appearances and goals as of 15 May 2022

Rick Wulle (born 4 June 1994) is a German professional footballer who plays as a goalkeeper.
