= Damian Roßbach =

German footballer

Personal information
- Date of birth: 27 February 1993 (age 33)
- Place of birth: Frankfurt, Germany
- Height: 1.87 m (6 ft 2 in)
- Position: Defender

Team information
- Current team: VSG Altglienicke
- Number: 13

Youth career
- 2010–2012: Mainz 05

Senior career*
Years	Team	Apps	(Gls)
2012–2015	Mainz 05 II	91	(7)
2015–2018	SV Sandhausen II	6	(0)
2015–2018	SV Sandhausen	43	(0)
2018–2020	Karlsruher SC	60	(3)
2020–2025	Hansa Rostock	134	(5)
2025–	VSG Altglienicke	32	(1)
- * Club domestic league appearances and goals as of 23 September 2026

Damian Roßbach (born 27 February 1993) is a German professional footballer who plays as a defender for Regionalliga Nordost club VSG Altglienicke.

== Club career ==
As a youth, he played for 1. FSV Mainz 05.

On 1 July 2014, he signed a one-year contract for the 2014–15 Bundesliga season, while still able to play for the reserve team in the 2014–15 3. Liga season.

== Career statistics ==
As of match played on 21 April 2023

Club statistics
Club	Season	League			National Cup		Other		Total	
Club	Season	Division	Apps	Goals	Apps	Goals	Apps	Goals	Apps	Goals
1. FSV Mainz 05 II	2012–13	Regionalliga Südwest	31	2	—		—		31	2
1. FSV Mainz 05 II	2013–14	Regionalliga Südwest	33	2	—		2 (Note: Appearances in the 2013–14 Promotion play-offs)	0	35	2
1. FSV Mainz 05 II	2014–15	3. Liga	27	3	—		—		27	3
1. FSV Mainz 05 II	1. FSV Mainz 05 II totals		91	7	0	0	2	0	93	7
SV Sandhausen II	2015–16	Oberliga Baden-Württemberg	1	0	—		—		1	0
SV Sandhausen II	2017–18	Oberliga Baden-Württemberg	5	0	—		—		5	0
SV Sandhausen II	SV Sandhausen II totals		6	0	0	0	0	0	6	0
SV Sandhausen	2015–16	2. Bundesliga	21	0	1	0	—		22	0
SV Sandhausen	2016–17	2. Bundesliga	19	0	2	0	—		21	0
SV Sandhausen	2017–18	2. Bundesliga	3	0	0	0	—		3	0
SV Sandhausen	SV Sandhausen totals		43	0	3	0	0	0	46	0
Karlsruher SC	2018–19	3. Liga	37	3	1	0	3 (Note: Appearances in the Baden Cup)	2	41	5
Karlsruher SC	2019–20	2. Bundesliga	23	0	3	0	2 (Note: Appearance(s) in the Mecklenburg-Vorpommern Cup)	0	28	0
Karlsruher SC	Karlsruher SC totals		60	3	4	0	5	2	69	5
Hansa Rostock	2020–21	3. Liga	25	1	1	0	1	0	27	1
Hansa Rostock	2021–22	2. Bundesliga	32	0	3	0	—		35	0
Hansa Rostock	2022–23	2. Bundesliga	24	1	1	0	—		25	1
Hansa Rostock	Hansa Rostock totals		81	2	5	0	1	0	87	2
Career totals			281	12	12	0	8	2	301	14
