= Boo FF =

Swedish football club

- Full name: Boo Fotbollförening
- Founded: 1981
- Ground: Boovallen; Boo; Sweden
- Chairman: Thomas Forslund
Home colours	Away colours

Boo FF is a Swedish football club located in Boo in Nacka Municipality, Stockholm County.

== Background ==
The women's team Boo FF currently plays in Division 1 Mellersta which is the second tier of the Swedish football league system. They play their home matches at the Boovallen in Boo.

The men's team play in Division 3 Stockholm Mellersta which is the fourth tier of Swedish football.

The club is affiliated to Stockholms Fotbollförbund.

== Season to season Men ==
Season	Level	Division	Section	Position	Movements
2006*	Tier 6	Division 4	Stockholm Mellersta	1st	Promoted
2007	Tier 5	Division 3	Östra Svealand	10th	Relegated
2008	Tier 6	Division 4	Stockholm Mellersta	5th	
2009	Tier 6	Division 4	Stockholm Mellersta	5th	
2010	Tier 6	Division 4	Stockholm Mellersta	8th	
2011	Tier 6	Division 4	Stockholm Mellersta		
2018	Tier 5	Division 3	Södra Svealand	10th	Relegated
2019	Tier 6	Division 4	Stockholm Mellerst	2nd	

* League restructuring in 2006 resulted in a new division being created at Tier 3 and subsequent divisions dropping a level.
