= Ahmet Gürleyen =

German footballer (born 1999)

Personal information
- Full name: Ahmet Ege Gürleyen
- Date of birth: 26 April 1999 (age 27)
- Place of birth: Berlin, Germany
- Height: 1.93 m (6 ft 4 in)
- Position: Centre-back

Team information
- Current team: Hansa Rostock
- Number: 15

Youth career
- –2015: Hertha Zehlendorf
- 2015: Tennis Borussia Berlin
- 2016–2018: Mainz 05

Senior career*
Years	Team	Apps	(Gls)
2018–2020	Mainz 05 II	37	(3)
2018–2021	Mainz 05	1	(0)
2020	→ Liefering (loan)	2	(0)
2020–2021	→ Wehen Wiesbaden (loan)	10	(1)
2021–2023	Wehen Wiesbaden	64	(5)
2023–2024	1. FC Nürnberg	15	(0)
2024–	Hansa Rostock	67	(2)

International career^{‡}
2018	Turkey U19	1	(0)
2018	Germany U19	1	(0)
2018	Germany U20	2	(1)
- * Club domestic league appearances and goals as of 28 May 2026 ‡ National team caps and goals as of 08:02, 20 August 2020 (UTC)

Ahmet Ege Gürleyen (born 26 April 1999) is a German professional footballer who plays as a centre-back for 3. Liga club Hansa Rostock.

== Club career ==
Gürleyen began his football career in Berlin and played for the U-17 teams of Hertha Zehlendorf and Tennis Borussia Berlin. For the 2016–17 season he moved to 1. FSV Mainz 05, where he started on the U-19 team and from 2018 for the second team in the Regionalliga. In the summer of 2018, he traveled with the professional team to a training camp in Venlo in the Netherlands and was used once as a substitute in the subsequent 2018-19 Bundesliga season. In October 2018 he signed a professional contract until 2022, but continued to play in the second team.

In February 2020, Gürleyen was loaned out to the Austrian Football Second League club FC Liefering, who was coached by Bo Svensson, his former coach in Mainz 05. During the loan spell, he made two appearances in the 2nd division for Liefering. After his return to Mainz 05 he played four times for the second team in the Regionalliga Südwest in the 2020–21 season.

On 5 October 2020, he was loaned out to 3. Liga club SV Wehen Wiesbaden until the end of the season.

On 18 July 2024, Gürleyen signed with Hansa Rostock in 3. Liga.
