= Ken Gipson =

German footballer

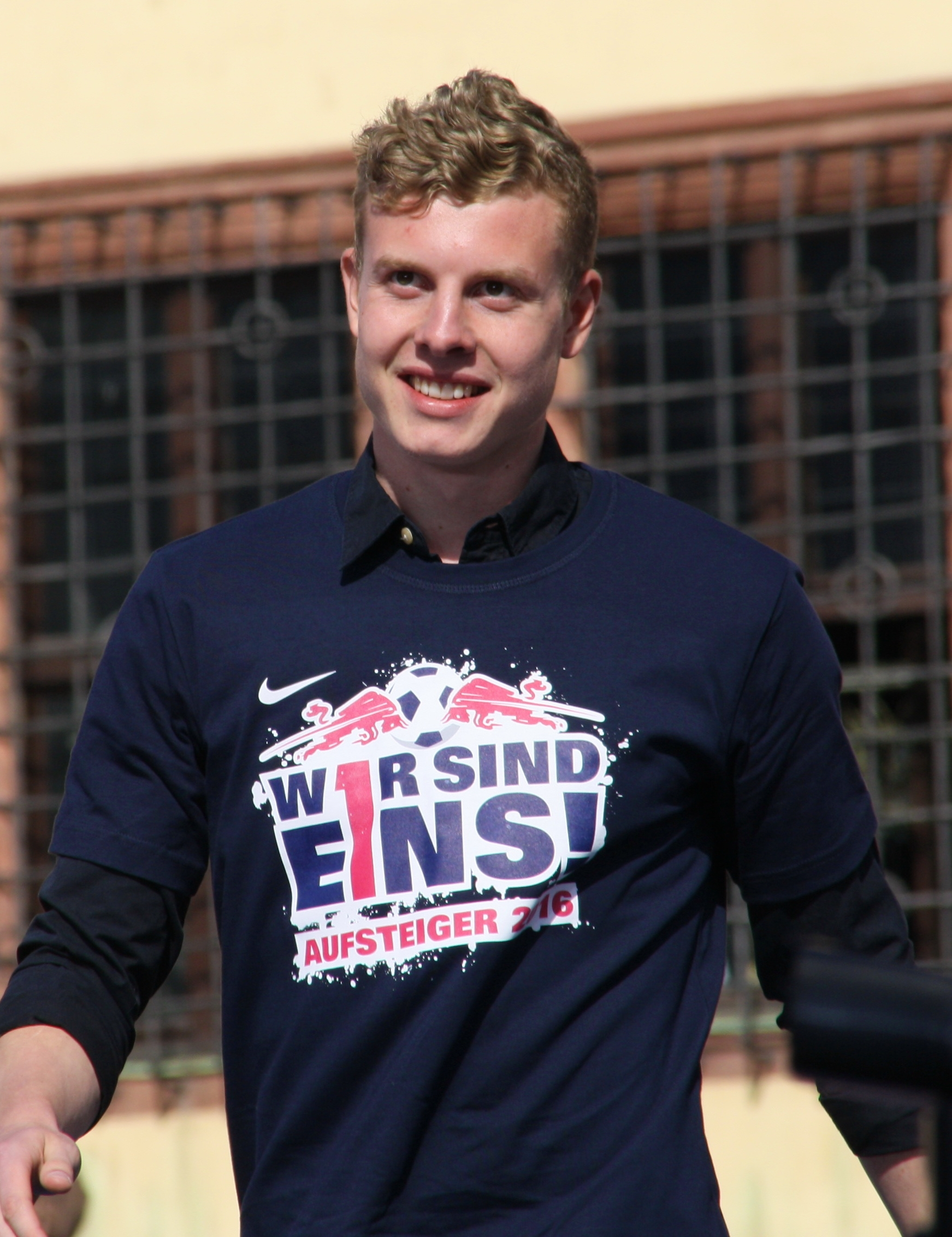
- Gipson in 2016

Personal information
- Full name: Ken Martin Gipson
- Date of birth: 24 February 1996 (age 30)
- Place of birth: Ludwigsburg, Germany
- Height: 1.78 m (5 ft 10 in)
- Position: Right-back

Team information
- Current team: SV Sandhausen
- Number: 24

Youth career
- 2011–2015: VfB Stuttgart

Senior career*
Years	Team	Apps	(Gls)
2015–2017	RB Leipzig II	34	(0)
2015–2017	RB Leipzig	2	(0)
2017–2019	SV Sandhausen	4	(0)
2019–2022	Sonnenhof Großaspach	83	(0)
2022–2025	Carl Zeiss Jena	90	(1)
2025–	SV Sandhausen	29	(1)
- * Club domestic league appearances and goals as of 24 September 2026

Ken Martin Gipson (born 24 February 1996) is a German professional footballer who plays as a right-back for SV Sandhausen.

== Club career ==
In June 2017, Gipson signed for 2. Bundesliga side SV Sandhausen on a two-year contract until 2019.

In August 2019, Gipson joined Sonnenhof Großaspach on a free transfer.

== International career ==
Gipŝon is German-born and of American descent, and is eligible for national teams of both countries.
