= Alexander Rossipal =

German footballer (born 1996)

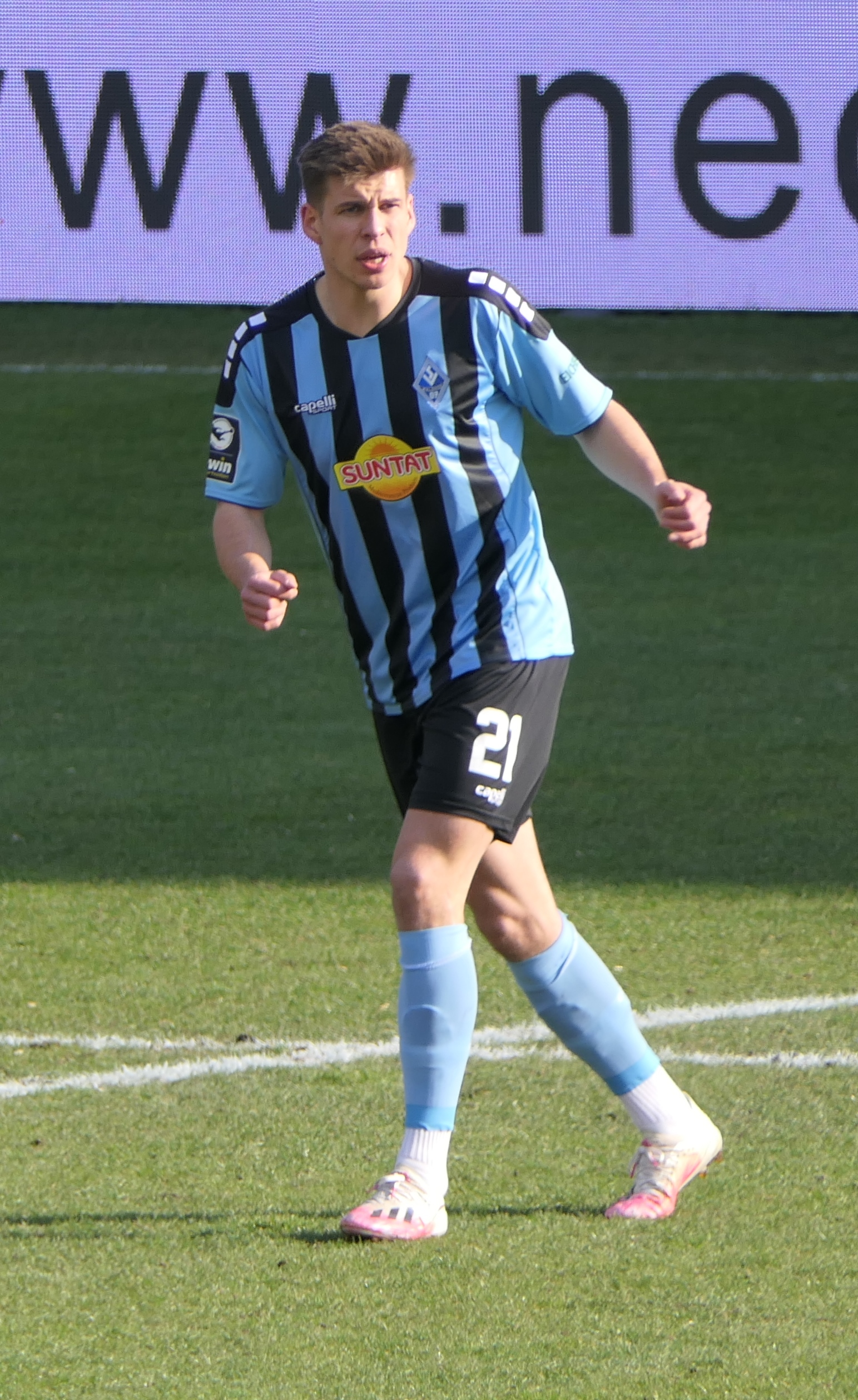

Personal information
- Date of birth: 6 June 1996 (age 30)
- Place of birth: Stuttgart, Germany
- Height: 1.84 m (6 ft 0 in)
- Position: Left-back

Team information
- Current team: Dynamo Dresden
- Number: 19

Youth career
- TV Kemnat
- VfB Stuttgart
- SGV Freiberg
- –2014: Stuttgarter Kickers
- 2014–2015: 1899 Hoffenheim

Senior career*
Years	Team	Apps	(Gls)
2015–2018	1899 Hoffenheim II	60	(2)
2017–2018	1899 Hoffenheim	0	(0)
2018–	SV Sandhausen	12	(1)
2019–2020	→ Preußen Münster (loan)	22	(0)
2021–2023	Waldhof Mannheim	60	(4)
2023–2025	Hansa Rostock	57	(2)
2024–2025	Hansa Rostock II	1	(0)
2025–	Dynamo Dresden	28	(4)

International career
2013	Germany U18	2	(0)
- * Club domestic league appearances and goals as of 18 May 2026

Alexander Rossipal (born 6 June 1996) is a German professional footballer who plays as a left-back for 2. Bundesliga club Dynamo Dresden.

== Career ==
Following the expiry his Sandhausen contract on 30 June 2021, Rossipal signed for Waldhof Mannheim on a free transfer on 27 July.

In summer 2023, he joined Hansa Rostock on a two-year contract.

On 25 May 2025, it was announced that Rossipal would join Dynamo Dresden for the 2025–26 season.
