= Manuel Stiefler =

German footballer (born 1988)

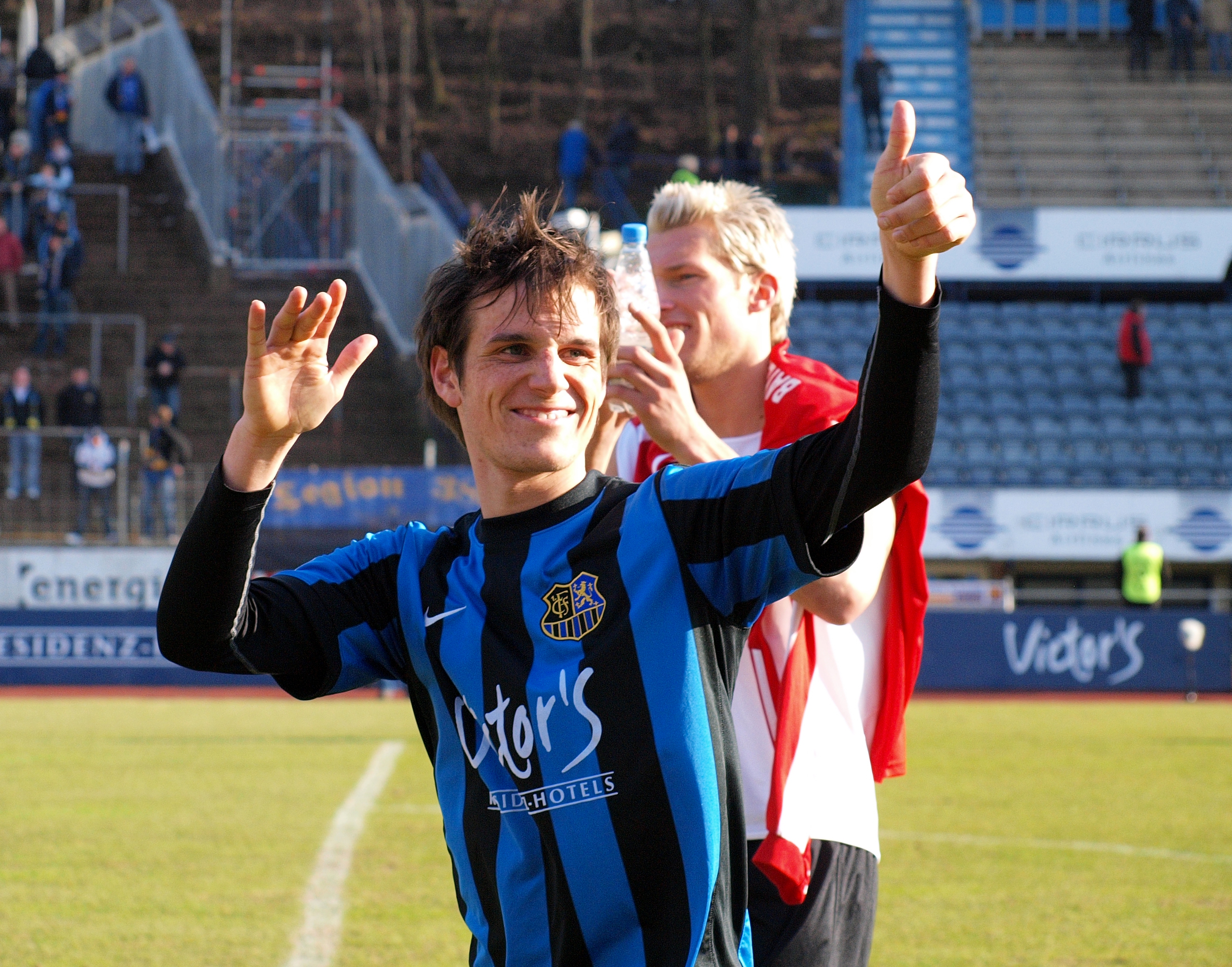
- Stiefler with 1. FC Saarbrücken in 2011

Personal information
- Date of birth: 25 July 1988 (age 38)
- Place of birth: Bayreuth, West Germany
- Height: 1.78 m (5 ft 10 in)
- Positions: Centre-back; defensive midfielder; central midfielder

Team information
- Current team: SpVgg Unterhaching
- Number: 8

Youth career
- –1999: TSC Pottenstein
- 1999–2002: SpVgg Bayreuth
- 2002–2007: Greuther Fürth

Senior career*
| Years | Team | Apps | (Gls) |
| 2007–2008 | SpVgg Bayreuth | 29 | (5) |
| 2008–2010 | 1. FC Nürnberg II | 63 | (8) |
| 2010–2013 | 1. FC Saarbrücken | 84 | (13) |
| 2013–2018 | SV Sandhausen | 82 | (5) |
| 2018–2020 | Karlsruher SC | 62 | (5) |
| 2021 | AEL | 12 | (1) |
| 2021– | SpVgg Unterhaching | 157 | (28) |
- * Club domestic league appearances and goals as of 27 September 2026

Manuel Stiefler (born 25 July 1988) is a German professional footballer who plays as a centre-back, defensive midfielder and central midfielder for club SpVgg Unterhaching.

== Career ==
After Stiefler's contract with Karlsruher SC expired in summer 2020, the club was still considering an extension in August.

Having spent six months as a free agent, Stiefler joined Super League Greece club AEL in January 2021, on a six-month deal.

On 21 July 2021, Stiefler returned to Germany and signed with SpVgg Unterhaching on a three-year contract.

== Honours ==
SpVgg Unterhaching

- Regionalliga Bayern: 2022–23
