= Nils Fröling =

Swedish footballer (born 2000)

Personal information
- Full name: Nils Gustav Georg Fröling
- Date of birth: 20 April 2000 (age 26)
- Place of birth: Dallas, Texas, U.S.
- Height: 1.81 m (5 ft 11 in)
- Position: Forward

Team information
- Current team: Dynamo Dresden
- Number: 16

Youth career
- –2016: Boo FF
- 2016–2017: Åtvidabergs FF

Senior career*
Years	Team	Apps	(Gls)
2015–2016	Boo FF	12	(2)
2017	Åtvidabergs FF	10	(0)
2018–2021	Kalmar FF	79	(13)
2022–2025	Hansa Rostock	90	(14)
2025–	Dynamo Dresden	23	(3)

International career^{‡}
2018	Sweden U19	6	(0)
2019–2021	Sweden U21	6	(0)
- * Club domestic league appearances and goals as of 18 May 2026 ‡ National team caps and goals as of 17:01, 23 November 2021 (UTC)

Nils Gustav Georg Fröling (born 20 April 2000) is a professional footballer who plays as a forward for German 2. Bundesliga club Dynamo Dresden. Born in the United States, he represents Sweden at youth level.

== Club career ==
=== Early career ===
Fröling made his first senior team practice with Division 5 team Boo FF at only 13 years. After having played in 11 games for Boo FF during the 2016 spring season in Division 5, Fröling left Boo FF to join Åtvidabergs FF. He made his Åtvidaberg debut in 2017, and played in ten games as Åtvidaberg was relegated from Superettan at the end of the season.

=== Kalmar FF ===
Fröling was signed by Kalmar FF ahead of the 2018 Allsvenskan season. He scored his first Allsvenskan goal in a 1–0 win at home against IK Sirius on 14 May 2018.

=== Hansa Rostock ===
Fröling moved to 2. Bundesliga club Hansa Rostock in December 2021. He signed a contract until summer 2025.

=== Dynamo Dresden ===
On 29 June 2025, Fröling joined Dynamo Dresden.

== International career ==
Fröling has represented the Sweden U19 and U21 teams. He is eligible to play for both the Sweden and United States national teams.

== Personal life ==
Fröling was born to Swedish parents in Dallas, Texas.

== Career statistics ==
=== Club ===
As of match played 26 August 2023

Appearances and goals by club, season and competition
Club	Season	Division	League		Cup		Europe		Other		Total	
Club	Season	Division	Apps	Goals	Apps	Goals	Apps	Goals	Apps	Goals	Apps	Goals
Boo FF	2015	Division 5	1	0	—		—		—		1	0
Boo FF	2016	Division 5	11	2	—		—		—		11	2
Boo FF	Total		12	2	—		—		—		12	2
Åtvidabergs FF	2017	Superettan	10	0	1	0	—		—		11	0
Kalmar FF	2018	Allsvenskan	14	2	0	0	—		—		14	2
Kalmar FF	2019	Allsvenskan	28	5	0	0	—		2 (Note: Appearances in the 2019 Allsvenskan Play-offs)	1	30	6
Kalmar FF	2020	Allsvenskan	10	2	3	2	—		2 (Note: Appearances in the 2020 Allsvenskan Play-offs)	1	15	5
Kalmar FF	2021	Allsvenskan	27	4	2	0	—		—		29	4
Kalmar FF	Total		79	13	5	2	—		4	2	88	17
Hansa Rostock	2021–22	2. Bundesliga	7	3	1	0	—		—		8	3
Hansa Rostock	2022–23	2. Bundesliga	26	3	1	0	—		—		27	3
Hansa Rostock	2023–24	2. Bundesliga	4	1	1	0	—		—		5	1
Hansa Rostock	Total		37	7	3	0	—		—		40	7
Career total			138	22	9	2	0	0	4	2	151	26
