= Mecklenburg-Vorpommern Cup =

- Founded: 1991
- Region: Mecklenburg-Vorpommern, Germany
- Qualifier for: DFB-Pokal
- Current champions: Hansa Rostock (2025–26)
- Most championships: Hansa Rostock (12 titles)

The Mecklenburg-Vorpommern Cup (German: Mecklenburg-Vorpommern Pokal) is an annual football cup competition, held by the Landesfußballverband Mecklenburg-Vorpommern (English: Mecklenburg-Vorpommern State Football Association) since 1991. For sponsorship reasons, the official name of the competition is Krombacher-Pokal. It is one of the 21 regional cup competitions in Germany and a qualifying competition for the German Cup, with the winner of the competition being automatically qualified for the first round of the German Cup in the following season.

The record winners of the competition are Hansa Rostock with nine titles to their name.

== Mode ==
The competition is open for all member clubs of the Mecklenburg-Vorpommern State FA playing in the 3. Liga, Regionalliga Nord, NOFV-Oberliga Nord, Verbandsliga Mecklenburg-Vorpommern and Landesligas. Additionally, the regional cup winners of the previous season are also qualified. Reserve teams are not permitted to compete anymore. Up until the quarter-finals, the teams from lower leagues have home advantage against teams from a higher league. From the quarter-finals onwards, this is not the case. In case of a draw after regular time, extra time is played and, if this remains inconclusive, the game is decided by a penalty shoot-out. The cup winners automatically qualify for the first round of the German Cup.

== Winners ==
The winners of the competition:

Club	Wins	Years
FC Hansa Rostock	12	1998^{‡}, 2005^{‡}, 2006^{‡}, 2011, 2015, 2016, 2017, 2018, 2019, 2020, 2025, 2026
FC Schönberg 95	7	1999, 2000, 2001, 2002, 2003^{‡}, 2004, 2012
Greifswalder SC	4	1993, 1994, 1995, 1996
TSG Neustrelitz	4	2007, 2008, 2013, 2022
1. FC Neubrandenburg	2	1992, 2014
Torgelower SV Greif	2	2009, 2010
SV Warnemünde	1	1997
SV Blau Weiß Parchim	1	1991
Rostocker FC	1	2023
Greifswalder FC	1	2024

- ^{‡} Won by reserve team.
