= 2025–26 Rangers F.C. season =

Rangers
2025–26 season
- Chairman: Andrew Cavenagh
- Head coach: Russell Martin (until 5 October); Danny Röhl (from 20 October)
- Stadium: Ibrox Stadium
- Scottish Premiership: 3rd
- Scottish Cup: Quarter-finals
- League Cup: Semi-finals
- Champions League: Play-off round
- Europa League: League phase
- Top goalscorer: League: Youssef Chermiti (15); All: Youssef Chermiti (15)
- Highest home attendance: 51,215 vs Celtic; 8 March 2026
- Lowest home attendance: 33,949 vs Alloa Athletic; 16 August 2025
- Average home league attendance: 50,309
- Biggest win: 8–0 vs Queen's Park; 8 February 2026
- Biggest defeat: 6–0 vs Club Brugge; 27 August 2025
Home colours	Away colours	Third colours
- All statistics correct as of 16 May 2026.

The 2025–26 season was the 146th season of competitive football by Rangers.

It was their tenth-consecutive season in the Scottish Premiership, the top tier of Scottish professional football. They also participated in two cup competitions – the Scottish Cup and the Scottish League Cup – and competed in the qualifying rounds of the UEFA Champions League, dropping into the UEFA Europa League league phase.

It was Russell Martin's first season as head coach, having been appointed on 5 June. However, only four months into the role, he was sacked on 5 October after a 1–1 draw with Falkirk which left the club in 8th position after just one win in 7 league games.

== Players ==
=== Squad information ===
N	Pos.	Nat.	Name	Age	Since	App	Goals	Ends	Transfer fee	Notes
1	GK	(England)	Jack Butland	33	2023	157	0	2027	Free	
2	DF	(England)	James Tavernier (captain)	35	2015	565	144	2026	£0.2m	
3	DF	(England)	Max Aarons	26	2025	35	1	2026	Loan	
5	DF	(Scotland)	John Souttar	30	2022	132	4	2027	Free	
7	FW	(Denmark)	Andreas Skov Olsen	26	2026	11	1	2026	Loan	
8	MF	(Scotland)	Connor Barron	24	2024	83	0	2028	Free	
9	FW	(Portugal)	Youssef Chermiti	22	2025	41	15	2029	£8m	
10	MF	(Ivory Coast)	Mohamed Diomande	25	2024	119	10	2028	£4.3m	
11	MF	(Norway)	Thelo Aasgaard	24	2025	48	8	2029	Undisclosed	
13	DF	(Canada)	Derek Cornelius	28	2025	12	1	2026	Loan	
14	MF	(Albania)	Nedim Bajrami	27	2024	63	7	2028	£3.4m	
18	FW	(Finland)	Oliver Antman	25	2025	28	1	2029	£3m	
20	FW	(Germany)	Ryan Naderi	23	2026	11	3	2029	£4.7m	
21	DF	(England)	Dujon Sterling	27	2023	87	3	2028	Free	
23	FW	(Mauritania)	Djeidi Gassama	23	2025	56	9	2029	£2.2m	
24	DF	(Burkina Faso)	Nasser Djiga	24	2025	42	0	2026	Loan	
25	DF	(Belgium)	Tuur Rommens	23	2026	12	1	2029	£3.5m	
28	FW	(North Macedonia)	Bojan Miovski	27	2025	42	13	2029	£2.6m	
30	DF	(England)	Jayden Meghoma	20	2025	44	1	2026	Loan	
31	GK	(Scotland)	Liam Kelly	30	2024 (Note: Players second spell at the club; 1st spell 2006–2018)	16	0	2026	Free	
32	GK	(Scotland)	Kieran Wright	27	2016	0	0	2026	Youth system	
37	DF	(Nigeria)	Emmanuel Fernandez	25	2025	33	6	2029	Undisclosed	
42	MF	(Denmark)	Tochi Chukwuani	23	2026	18	3	2029	£4m	
43	MF	(Belgium)	Nicolas Raskin	25	2023	145	13	2028	£1.75m	
46	FW	(England)	Zebedee Lawson	18	2026	2	0	2028	Cross-border compensation	
47	MF	(England)	Mikey Moore	19	2025	47	7	2026	Loan	
49	MF	(Scotland)	Bailey Rice	20	2022	16	0	2026	Undisclosed	
64	MF	(Scotland)	Aiden McCallion	18	2024	1	0	2027	Youth system	
82	DF	(Scotland)	Ashton Scally	16	2026	1	0	2029	Youth system	

- Last updated: 16 May 2026

=== Players loaned out ===
N	Pos.	Nat.	Name	Age	Since	App	Goals	Ends	Transfer fee	Notes
15	MF	(Ecuador)	José Cifuentes	27	2023	20	0	2027	£1.2m	on loan at Toronto FC
16	MF	(Scotland)	Lyall Cameron	24	2025	10	1	2029	Free	on loan at Aberdeen
19	DF	(France)	Clinton Nsiala	22	2024	17	1	2028	Free	on loan at Westerlo
26	DF	(England)	Ben Davies	31	2022	58	1	2026	£3m	on loan at Oxford United
38	DF	(Scotland)	Leon King	22	2020	42	0	2026	Youth system	on loan at Ayr United
45	FW	(Northern Ireland)	Ross McCausland	23	2021	66	7	2027	Youth system	on loan at Aris Limassol
48	MF	(England)	Paul Nsio	20	2022	3	0	2027	Cross-border compensation	on loan at Raith Rovers
52	MF	(Scotland)	Findlay Curtis	20	2024	26	3	2027	Youth system	on loan at Kilmarnock
54	GK	(Northern Ireland)	Mason Munn	20	2022	1	0	2028	Youth system	on loan at Forfar Athletic
99	FW	(Brazil)	Danilo	27	2023	76	16	2028	£5.6m	on loan at NEC Nijmegen
	FW	(Colombia)	Óscar Cortés	22	2024	21	1	2029	£4.5m	on loan at Huracán

- Last updated: 2 February 2026

=== Transfers ===
==== In ====
===== First team =====
No.	Pos.	Nat.	Name	Age	Moving from	Type	Transfer window	Ends	Transfer fee	Source
16	MF	(Scotland)	Lyall Cameron	22	Dundee	Transfer	Summer	2029	Free	
7	FW	(Colombia)	Óscar Cortés	21	RC Lens (France)	Transfer	Summer	2029	£4.5m	
3	DF	(England)	Max Aarons	25	Bournemouth (England)	Loan	Summer	2026	N/A	
6	MF	(England)	Joe Rothwell	30	Bournemouth (England)	Transfer	Summer	2028	£0.4m	
37	DF	(Nigeria)	Emmanuel Fernandez	23	Peterborough United (England)	Transfer	Summer	2029	Undisclosed	
11	MF	(Norway)	Thelo Aasgaard	23	Luton Town (England)	Transfer	Summer	2029	Undisclosed	
24	DF	(Burkina Faso)	Nasser Djiga	22	Wolves (England)	Loan	Summer	2026	N/A	
23	FW	(Mauritania)	Djeidi Gassama	21	Sheffield Wednesday (England)	Transfer	Summer	2029	£2.2m	
47	MF	(England)	Mikey Moore	17	Tottenham Hotspur (England)	Loan	Summer	2026	N/A	
18	FW	(Finland)	Oliver Antman	23	Go Ahead Eagles (Netherlands)	Transfer	Summer	2029	£3m	
30	DF	(England)	Jayden Meghoma	19	Brentford (England)	Loan	Summer	2026	N/A	
28	FW	(North Macedonia)	Bojan Miovski	26	Girona (Spain)	Transfer	Summer	2029	£2.6m	
9	FW	(Portugal)	Youssef Chermiti	21	Everton (England)	Transfer	Summer	2029	£8m	
13	DF	(Canada)	Derek Cornelius	27	Marseille (France)	Loan	Summer	2026	N/A	
42	MF	(Denmark)	Tochi Chukwuani	22	Sturm Graz (Austria)	Transfer	Winter	2029	£4m	
25	DF	(Belgium)	Tuur Rommens	22	Westerlo (Belgium)	Transfer	Winter	2029	£3.5m	
7	FW	(Denmark)	Andreas Skov Olsen	26	Wolfsburg (Germany)	Loan	Winter	2026	N/A	
20	FW	(Germany)	Ryan Naderi	22	Hansa Rostock (Germany)	Transfer	Winter	2029	£4.7m	

===== Academy =====
No.	Pos.	Nat.	Name	Age	Moving from	Type	Transfer window	Ends	Transfer fee	Source
	DF	(Scotland)	James Reid	16	Queen's Park	Transfer	Summer	2027	N/A	
46	FW	(England)	Zebedee Lawson	16	Brighton & Hove Albion (England)	Transfer	Summer	2028	N/A	

==== Out ====
===== First team =====
No.	Pos.	Nat.	Name	Age	Moving to	Type	Transfer window	Transfer fee	Source
26	DF	(Nigeria)	Leon Balogun	36	Aris Limassol (Cyprus)	End of contract	Summer	Free	
30	MF	(Romania)	Ianis Hagi	26	Alanyaspor (Turkey)	End of contract	Summer	Free	
11	FW	(Wales)	Tom Lawrence	31	Perth Glory (Australia)	End of contract	Summer	Free	
44	DF	(Scotland)	Adam Devine	22	Airdrieonians	End of contract	Summer	Free	
48	MF	(Scotland)	Cole McKinnon	22	Airdrieonians	End of contract	Summer	Free	
53	FW	(England)	Archie Stevens	19	Arsenal (England)	End of contract	Summer	Free	
4	DF	(Netherlands)	Robin Pröpper	31	Twente (Netherlands)	Transfer	Summer	Undisclosed	
54	GK	(Northern Ireland)	Mason Munn	19	Dunfermline Athletic	Loan	Summer	N/A	
45	FW	(Northern Ireland)	Ross McCausland	22	Aris Limassol (Cyprus)	Loan	Summer	N/A	
44	DF	(Scotland)	Robbie Fraser	22	Dunfermline Athletic	Transfer	Summer	Undisclosed	
22	DF	(Brazil)	Jefté	21	Palmeiras (Brazil)	Transfer	Summer	£6m	
15	MF	(Ecuador)	Jose Cifuentes	26	Toronto FC (Canada)	Loan	Summer	N/A	
26	DF	(England)	Ben Davies	30	Oxford United (England)	Loan	Summer	N/A	
33	DF	(Turkey)	Rıdvan Yılmaz	24	Beşiktaş (Turkey)	Transfer	Summer	£2m	
29	FW	(Morocco)	Hamza Igamane	22	Lille (France)	Transfer	Summer	£10.5m	
7	FW	(Colombia)	Óscar Cortés	21	Sporting Gijón (Spain)	Loan	Summer	N/A	
9	FW	(Nigeria)	Cyriel Dessers	30	Panathinaikos (Greece)	Transfer	Summer	£3.5m	
38	DF	(Scotland)	Leon King	21	Ayr United	Loan	Summer	N/A	
48	MF	(England)	Paul Nsio	19	Raith Rovers	Loan	Summer	N/A	
7	FW	(Colombia)	Óscar Cortés	22	Huracán (Argentina)	Loan	Winter	N/A	
16	MF	(Scotland)	Lyall Cameron	23	Aberdeen	Loan	Winter	N/A	
20	MF	(England)	Kieran Dowell	28	Hull City (England)	Transfer	Winter	Undisclosed	
52	MF	(Scotland)	Findlay Curtis	19	Kilmarnock	Loan	Winter	N/A	
6	MF	(England)	Joe Rothwell	31	Sheffield United (England)	Transfer	Winter	Undisclosed	
19	DF	(France)	Clinton Nsiala	22	Westerlo (Belgium)	Loan	Winter	N/A	
99	FW	(Brazil)	Danilo	26	NEC Nijmegen (Netherlands)	Loan	Winter	N/A	
54	GK	(Northern Ireland)	Mason Munn	19	Forfar Athletic	Loan	Winter	N/A	
17	FW	(Wales)	Rabbi Matondo	25	SK Brann (Norway)	Transfer	Winter	Free	
32	GK	(Scotland)	Kieran Wright	27	Kilmarnock	Emergency Loan	Winter	N/A	

===== Academy =====
No.	Pos.	Nat.	Name	Age	Moving to	Type	Transfer window	Transfer fee	Source
41	GK	(Scotland)	Lewis Budinauckas	22	Partick Thistle	End of contract	Summer	Free	
61	MF	(Scotland)	Kerr Robertson	19	Greenock Morton	End of contract	Summer	Free	
64	DF	(Scotland)	Kristian Webster	20	Dumbarton	End of contract	Summer	Free	
65	DF	(Scotland)	Leyton Grant	19	Stenhousemuir	End of contract	Summer	Free	
69	GK	(Scotland)	Jacob Pazikas	20	Rimal Al-Sahra SC (United Arab Emirates)	End of contract	Summer	Free	
73	MF	(Scotland)	Grant Leitch	18	Kelty Hearts	End of contract	Summer	Free	
81	MF	(Scotland)	Harry Weir	17	Partick Thistle	End of contract	Summer	Free	
	GK	(Scotland)	Jay Hogarth	21	Clyde	End of contract	Summer	Free	
	DF	(Scotland)	Jack Harkness	21	Stirling Albion	End of contract	Summer	Free	
	MF	(Scotland)	Darren McInally	21	Kelty Hearts	End of contract	Summer	Free	
	GK	(Scotland)	Alfie Halliwell	17	Albion Rovers	Loan	Summer	N/A	
55	DF	(Scotland)	Jack Wyllie	17	Kelty Hearts	Loan	Summer	N/A	
50	FW	(Wales)	Josh Gentles	17	Raith Rovers	Co-operation loan	Summer	N/A	
51	MF	(Scotland)	Calum Adamson	18	Alloa Athletic	Co-operation loan	Summer	N/A	
	MF	(Northern Ireland)	Blaine McClure	18	Nottingham Forest (England)	Loan	Summer	N/A	
63	DF	(Scotland)	Zander Hutton	19	Hamilton Academical	Loan	Summer	N/A	
61	MF	(Scotland)	Lewis Stewart	18	Alloa Athletic	Co-operation loan	Summer	N/A	
58	DF	(Scotland)	Connor Campbell	18	Stirling Albion	Co-operation loan	Summer	N/A	
53	FW	(Scotland)	Chris Eadie	18	Stirling Albion	Co-operation loan	Summer	N/A	
56	DF	(Scotland)	Arran Kerr	18	Stirling Albion	Co-operation loan	Summer	N/A	
79	MF	(Northern Ireland)	Callum Burnside	18	Alloa Athletic	Loan	Summer	N/A	
60	DF	(Scotland)	Lyle Wark	18	Forfar Athletic	Loan	Summer	N/A	
93	FW	(Scotland)	Cormac Christie	17	Forfar Athletic	Loan	Summer	N/A	
50	FW	(Wales)	Josh Gentles	18	Alloa Athletic	Co-operation loan	Winter	N/A	
59	DF	(Scotland)	Cameron Scott	18	Burnley (England)	Transfer	Winter	Undisclosed	
53	FW	(Scotland)	Chris Eadie	18	Sheffield United (England)	Transfer	Winter	Undisclosed	
62	MF	(Scotland)	Alexander Smith	17	Dumbarton	Loan	Winter	N/A	

==== New contracts ====
===== First team =====
N	P	Nat.	Name	Age	Date signed	Contract length	Expiry date	Source
32	GK	(Scotland)	Kieran Wright	26	3 July	1 year	May 2026	
48	MF	(England)	Paul Nsio	19	12 September	2 years	May 2027	
5	DF	(Scotland)	John Souttar	29	19 February	1 year	May 2027	

===== Academy =====
N	P	Nat.	Name	Age	Date signed	Contract length	Expiry date	Source
51	MF	(Scotland)	Calum Adamson	17	10 July	2 years	May 2027	
55	DF	(Scotland)	Jack Wyllie	17	11 July	2 years	May 2027	
57	GK	(Scotland)	Greig Thackray	17	12 July	1 year	May 2026	
	GK	(Scotland)	Sam Reid	16	18 July	2 years	May 2027	
	FW	(Scotland)	Max Cameron	16	19 July	2 years	May 2027	
69	DF	(Scotland)	Oliver Hynd	17	19 July	2 years	May 2027	
63	DF	(Scotland)	Zander Hutton	18	30 July	2 years	May 2027	
80	MF	(Scotland)	Ben Hutton	15	30 July	2 years	May 2027	
60	DF	(Scotland)	Lyle Wark	17	31 July	2 years	May 2027	
78	DF	(Scotland)	Conor Owen	16	20 August	2 years	May 2027	
	GK	(Scotland)	Jaden Milarvie	16	20 August	2 years	May 2027	
	DF	(Scotland)	Calum Young	16	21 August	2 years	May 2027	
	DF	(Scotland)	Ashton Patton	16	21 August	2 years	May 2027	
79	MF	(Northern Ireland)	Callum Burnside	18	16 October	2 years	May 2027	
91	MF	(Scotland)	Kyle Glasgow	16	27 February	1 year	May 2027	
50	FW	(Wales)	Josh Gentles	18	28 February	1 year	May 2027	
82	DF	(Scotland)	Ashton Scally	16	21 April	3 years	May 2029	

== Pre-season and friendlies ==
28 June 2025 Friendly	Rangers	0–1	The New Saints	Milngavie, Scotland
			Goal	Stadium: Rangers Training Centre; Attendance: N/A
Note: The match was played behind closed doors.

6 July 2025 Friendly	Rangers	2–2	Club Brugge	Glasgow, Scotland
14:00 BST (UTC+1)	Diomande 51'; Curtis 89'	Report	Vetlesen 10'; Reis 13'	Stadium: Ibrox Stadium; Attendance: 29,480; Referee: Don Robertson

12 July 2025 Friendly	Rangers	1–1	Barnsley	Burton upon Trent, England
12:00 BST (UTC+1)	Danilo	Report	Watters	Stadium: St George’s Park; Attendance: N/A
Note: The match was played behind closed doors.

15 July 2025 Friendly	Rangers	4–1	Dunfermline Athletic	Milngavie, Scotland
	Danilo; Dowell; Aasgaard; Raskin	Report	Goal	Stadium: Rangers Training Centre; Attendance: N/A
Note: The match was played behind closed doors.

19 July 2025 Friendly	Rangers	2–0	Hamilton Academical	Milngavie, Scotland
	Danilo,	Report		Stadium: Rangers Training Centre; Attendance: N/A
Note: The match was played behind closed doors.

26 July 2025 Friendly	Rangers	2–2	Middlesbrough	Glasgow, Scotland
14:00 BST (UTC+1)	Danilo 63'; Curtis 78'	Report	Borges 9'; Fry 57'	Stadium: Ibrox Stadium; Attendance: 33,066; Referee: John Beaton

== Competitions ==
Win Draw Loss Postponed

=== Overall ===
Competition	First match	Last match	Starting round	Final position	Record							
Competition	First match	Last match	Starting round	Final position	Pld	W	D	L	GF	GA	GD	Win %
Scottish Premiership	2 August 2025	16 May 2026	Matchday 1	3rd	38	20	12	6	76	43	+33	52.63
Scottish Cup	16 January 2026	8 March 2026	Fourth round	Quarter-finals	3	2	1	0	13	0	+13	66.67
Scottish League Cup	16 August 2025	2 November 2025	Second round	Semi-finals	3	2	0	1	7	5	+2	66.67
UEFA Champions League	22 July 2025	27 August 2025	Second qualifying round	Play-off round	6	2	1	3	8	12	−4	33.33
UEFA Europa League	25 September 2025	29 January 2026	League phase	League phase	8	1	1	6	5	14	−9	12.50
Total					58	27	15	16	109	74	+35	46.55

Source: Competitions

=== Scottish Premiership ===
==== League table ====
Pos	Team	Pld	W	D	L	GF	GA	GD	Pts	Qualification or relegation (Note: Teams played each other three times (33 matches), before the league was split into two groups (the top six and the bottom six).)
1	Celtic (C)	38	26	4	8	73	41	+32	82	Qualification for the Champions League play-off round
2	Heart of Midlothian	38	24	8	6	67	34	+33	80	Qualification for the Champions League second qualifying round
3	Rangers	38	20	12	6	76	43	+33	72	Qualification for the Europa League third qualifying round (Note: Since the 2025–26 Scottish Cup winners, Celtic, qualified for the Champions League via league position, the spot reserved for the cup winners (Europa League third qualifying round) was passed to the third-placed team, and the spots for the Conference League second qualifying round were moved down one league position.)
4	Motherwell	38	16	13	9	59	36	+23	61	Qualification for the Conference League second qualifying round
5	Hibernian	38	15	12	11	58	44	+14	57	Qualification for the Conference League second qualifying round

Rules for classification: 1) Points; 2) Goal difference; 3) Goals scored; 4) Head-to-head points; 5) Head-to-head goal difference; 6) Play-off (only if deciding champion, UEFA competition qualification, second stage group allocation, or relegation).
(C) Champions

==== Results by round ====
Round	1	2	3	4	5	6	7	8	9	10	12	13	14	15	16	17	18	19	20	21	11^{1}	22	23	24	25	26	27	28	29	30	31	32	33	34	35	36	37	38
Ground	A	H	A	H	H	A	A	H	H	A	A	H	H	A	A	H	A	H	H	A	H	A	H	A	H	A	H	A	H	A	H	H	A	H	A	A	H	A
Result	D	D	D	D	L	W	D	D	W	W	W	W	D	D	W	W	L	W	W	W	W	W	W	D	W	D	W	D	D	W	W	W	W	L	L	L	L	W
Position	8	6	7	7	10	8	8	6	5	3	4	4	4	4	4	3	4	3	3	3	2	2	2	3	2	2	2	2	2	3	2	2	2	3	3	3	3	3
Points	1	2	3	4	4	7	8	9	12	15	18	21	22	23	26	29	29	32	35	38	41	44	47	48	51	52	55	56	57	60	63	66	69	69	69	69	69	72

Source: Competition Match Reports
A = Away; H = Home; W = Win; D = Draw; L = Loss
Notes:
- ^{1} Matchday 11 (vs Aberdeen) was rescheduled due to Rangers' participation in the Scottish League Cup semi-finals.

==== Matches ====
2 August 2025 1	Motherwell	1–1	Rangers	Motherwell
17:30 BST	Watt (yellow card) 60'; Longelo 87'	Report	Tavernier 14', (yellow card) 90+2'; Cameron (yellow card) 64'; Dowell (yellow card) 84'; Aarons (yellow card) 90'	Stadium: Fir Park; Attendance: 10,616; Referee: Steven McLean

9 August 2025 2	Rangers	1–1	Dundee	Glasgow
17:45 BST	Antman (yellow card) 54'; Djiga (red card) 59'; Tavernier 90+2' (pen.); Dessers (yellow card) 90+6'	Report	Astley 51'; Robertson (yellow card) 86'	Stadium: Ibrox Stadium; Attendance: 48,958; Referee: Don Robertson

24 August 2025 3	St Mirren	1–1	Rangers	Paisley
12:00 BST	Ayunga 32'; O'Hara (yellow card) 35'; Baccus (yellow card) 48'; Gogić (yellow card) 82'	Report	Raskin (yellow card) 17'; Aarons (yellow card) 35'; Curtis 78'; Souttar (yellow card) 90+2'	Stadium: St Mirren Park; Attendance: 6,886; Referee: Nick Walsh

31 August 2025 4	Rangers	0–0	Celtic	Glasgow
12:00 BST	Moore (yellow card) 63'; Diomande (yellow card) 67'; Djiga (yellow card) 88'	Report		Stadium: Ibrox Stadium; Attendance: 50,013; Referee: Don Robertson

13 September 2025 5	Rangers	0–2	Heart of Midlothian	Glasgow
15:00 BST	Tavernier (yellow card) 68'; Souttar (yellow card) 84'	Report	Shankland 21', (penalty missed) 82', 82'; Findlay (yellow card) 70'	Stadium: Ibrox Stadium; Attendance: 50,697; Referee: Steven McLean

28 September 2025 6	Livingston	1–2	Rangers	Livingston
15:00 BST	Tait (yellow card) 25'; May (yellow card) 27'; Finlayson (yellow card) 46'; Sylla 68'; Montgomery (yellow card) 90'	Report	Tavernier 23', (penalty missed) 27'; Bajrami (yellow card) 83'; Aarons 90+4'	Stadium: Almondvale Stadium; Attendance: 8,590; Referee: John Beaton

5 October 2025 7	Falkirk	1–1	Rangers	Falkirk
15:00 BST	Spencer (yellow card) 72'; Cartwright 73'	Report	Miovski 41'; Tavernier (yellow card) 45+1'; Barron (yellow card) 51'; Diomande (yellow card) 87'; Gassama (yellow card) 90+7'	Stadium: Falkirk Stadium; Attendance: 7,652; Referee: Matthew MacDermid

18 October 2025 8	Rangers	2–2	Dundee United	Glasgow
15:00 BST	Aasgaard 25'; Tavernier 87'	Report	Sapsford (yellow card) 57'; Möller (yellow card) 61'; Esselink (yellow card) 64'; Trapanovski 66'; Sibbald 75'	Stadium: Ibrox Stadium; Attendance: 50,663; Referee: Don Robertson

26 October 2025 9	Rangers	3–1	Kilmarnock	Glasgow
15:00 GMT	Cornelius 15'; Souttar (yellow card) 38'; Danilo 51'; Chermiti 72'	Report	Stanger 39'; Dackers (yellow card) 45+1'; Thompson (yellow card) 76'	Stadium: Ibrox Stadium; Attendance: 49,681; Referee: Kevin Clancy

29 October 2025 10	Hibernian	0–1	Rangers	Edinburgh
19:45 GMT	Cadden (yellow card) 10'; Hanley (yellow card) 37'; McGrath (penalty missed) 87'	Report	Danilo 5'; Meghoma (yellow card) 30'; Cornelius (yellow card) 41'; Barron (yellow card) 55'	Stadium: Easter Road; Attendance: 18,550; Referee: John Beaton

9 November 2025 12	Dundee	0–3	Rangers	Dundee
15:00 GMT		Report	Raskin 9', (yellow card) 64'; Moore 14'; Gassama 90'	Stadium: Dens Park; Attendance: 8,562; Referee: Matthew MacDermid

22 November 2025 13	Rangers	2–1	Livingston	Glasgow
15:00 GMT	Fernandez 9'; Meghoma (yellow card) 59'; Diomande 78'; Bajrami (yellow card) 81'	Report	Yengi 18'; Montaño (yellow card) 62'; Lawal (yellow card) 71'; Muirhead (yellow card) 85'; Susoho (yellow card) 90+1'	Stadium: Ibrox Stadium; Attendance: 49,686; Referee: Ross Hardie

30 November 2025 14	Rangers	0–0	Falkirk	Glasgow
14:00 GMT		Report	Tait (yellow card) 41'; Allan (yellow card) 89'; Bain (yellow card) 90+4'	Stadium: Ibrox Stadium; Attendance: 50,288; Referee: Steven McLean

3 December 2025 15	Dundee United	2–2	Rangers	Dundee
19:45 GMT	Sapsford 11'; Keresztes (yellow card) 42'; Stephenson (yellow card) 57'; Fatah 66'; Strain (yellow card) 89'	Report	Meghoma 23'; Djiga (yellow card) 68'; Gassama (yellow card) 71'; Barron (yellow card) 73'; Bajrami 90+8' (pen.)	Stadium: Tannadice Park; Attendance: 13,213; Referee: David Dickinson

6 December 2025 16	Kilmarnock	0–3	Rangers	Kilmarnock
20:00 GMT	Watson (yellow card) 48'; Thompson (yellow card) 83'	Report	Miovski 33', 54', (yellow card) 45+2'; Djiga (yellow card) 45+2'; Moore 81'	Stadium: Rugby Park; Attendance: 7,010; Referee: Kevin Clancy

15 December 2025 17	Rangers	1–0	Hibernian	Glasgow
19:45 GMT	Fernandez 35', (yellow card) 45+1'	Report	McGrath (yellow card) 52'; Youan (yellow card) 62'; Iredale (yellow card) 76'	Stadium: Ibrox Stadium; Attendance: 50,226; Referee: Don Robertson

21 December 2025 18	Heart of Midlothian	2–1	Rangers	Edinburgh
13:30 GMT	Findlay 38'; Shankland 42'; McEntee (yellow card) 61'; Baningime (yellow card) 90+2'	Report	Moore (yellow card) 90+4'; Chermiti 90+5'	Stadium: Tynecastle Park; Attendance: 18,829; Referee: Nick Walsh

27 December 2025 19	Rangers	1–0	Motherwell	Glasgow
15:00 GMT	Aasgaard 67', (yellow card) 80'; Barron (yellow card) 78'; Souttar (yellow card) 90'	Report	McGinn (yellow card) 86'	Stadium: Ibrox Stadium; Attendance: 50,828; Referee: David Dickinson

30 December 2025 20	Rangers	2–1	St Mirren	Glasgow
19:45 GMT	Aasgaard 39'; Fernandez 52'; Butland (yellow card) 82'	Report	Idowu (yellow card) 55'; Fraser (yellow card) 59', (penalty missed) 75'; Mandron 82'	Stadium: Ibrox Stadium; Attendance: 50,526; Referee: Ryan Lee

3 January 2026 21	Celtic	1–3	Rangers	Glasgow
12:30 GMT	Yang 19'	Report	Aasgaard (yellow card) 7'; Chermiti 50', 59'; Gassama (yellow card) 55'; Moore 71'; Miovski (yellow card) 90+2'	Stadium: Celtic Park; Attendance: 58,673; Referee: Steven McLean

6 January 2026 11	Rangers	2–0	Aberdeen	Glasgow
20:00 GMT	Fernandez 11'; Raskin 41'	Report	Devlin (yellow card) 5'; Knoester (yellow card) 50'	Stadium: Ibrox Stadium; Attendance: 50,375; Referee: Nick Walsh
Note: The fixture was rescheduled from 1 November 2025 due to Rangers' participation in the Scottish League Cup semi-finals.

11 January 2026 22	Aberdeen	0–2	Rangers	Aberdeen
16:30 GMT	Knoester (yellow card) 54'; Clarkson (yellow card) 63'	Report	Aasgaard 23', (yellow card) 59'; Souttar (yellow card) 54'; Chermiti (yellow card) 63'; Tavernier 74' (pen.)	Stadium: Pittodrie Stadium; Attendance: 18,151; Referee: David Dickinson

25 January 2026 23	Rangers	3–0	Dundee	Glasgow
15:00 GMT	Tavernier 48' (pen.); Djiga (yellow card) 58'; Danilo 90+1'; Gassama 90+4'	Report	Hamilton (yellow card) 44'	Stadium: Ibrox Stadium; Attendance: 50,165; Referee: Kevin Clancy

1 February 2026 24	Hibernian	0–0	Rangers	Edinburgh
14:00 GMT	Boyle (yellow card) 34'; Newell (yellow card) 35'; Iredale (yellow card) 51'	Report	Sterling (yellow card) 38'; Raskin (yellow card) 51'	Stadium: Easter Road; Attendance: 18,227; Referee: Matthew MacDermid

4 February 2026 25	Rangers	5–1	Kilmarnock	Glasgow
19:45 GMT	Tavernier 5' (pen.), (yellow card) 43'; Miovski 58'; Skov Olsen 74'; Antman 89'; Moore 90+3'	Report	Thompson (red card) 4'; John-Jules (yellow card) 23'; Kiltie 84'	Stadium: Ibrox Stadium; Attendance: 49,056; Referee: David Dickinson

11 February 2026 26	Motherwell	1–1	Rangers	Motherwell
20:00 GMT	Said (yellow card) 56'; Just (yellow card) 63'; Fadinger (red card) 78'; Welsh 89'	Report	Raskin 6', (yellow card) 43'; Diomande (yellow card) 14'; Meghoma (yellow card) 75'; Souttar (yellow card) 80'; Miovski (yellow card) 87'	Stadium: Fir Park; Attendance: 9,845; Referee: Steven McLean

15 February 2026 27	Rangers	4–2	Heart of Midlothian	Glasgow
16:30 GMT	Steinwender 19' (o.g.); Skov Olsen (yellow card) 29'; Chermiti 39', 57', 90', (yellow card) 83'; Gassama (yellow card) 90+3'; Diomande (yellow card) 90+4'	Report	Ageu (yellow card) 4'; Leonard 16', (yellow card) 49'; Braga 30'; Milne (yellow card) 59'	Stadium: Ibrox Stadium; Attendance: 51,092; Referee: Don Robertson

22 February 2026 28	Livingston	2–2	Rangers	Livingston
15:00 GMT	Kabongolo 14'; Finlayson (yellow card) 26'; Smith 55'; Montaño (red card) 60'; Prior (yellow card) 88'; May (yellow card) 90+2'	Report	Raskin (yellow card) 81'; Fernandez 81'; Moore 88'; Chermiti (yellow card) 88'	Stadium: Almondvale Stadium; Attendance: 8,736; Referee: Ryan Lee

1 March 2026 29	Rangers	2–2	Celtic	Glasgow
12:00 GMT	Chermiti 8', 26'; Souttar (yellow card) 79'; Raskin (yellow card) 90'	Report	McGregor (yellow card) 39'; Tierney 56'; Hatate (penalty missed) 90+1', 90+1'	Stadium: Ibrox Stadium; Attendance: 50,129; Referee: John Beaton

15 March 2026 30	St Mirren	0–1	Rangers	Paisley
12:00 GMT		Report	Rommens 31'; Djiga (yellow card) 90+2'	Stadium: St Mirren Park; Attendance: 6,898; Referee: Steven McLean

21 March 2026 31	Rangers	4–1	Aberdeen	Glasgow
17:45 GMT	Chukwuani 35'; Moore 48'; Raskin 62'; Tavernier 90+6'	Report	Milne (yellow card) 29'; Geiger 52', (yellow card) 59'; Gyamfi (yellow card) 69'; Keskinen (yellow card) 90+5'	Stadium: Ibrox Stadium; Attendance: 50,970; Referee: Matthew MacDermid

4 April 2026 32	Rangers	4–2	Dundee United	Glasgow
15:00 BST	Naderi 30'; Sterling 40'; Aasgaard 52', (yellow card) 16'; Miovski 85'	Report	Fatah 45'; Agyei (yellow card) 59'; Keresztes (yellow card) 68'; Sapsford 72'	Stadium: Ibrox Stadium; Attendance: 50,012; Referee: John Beaton

12 April 2026 33	Falkirk	3–6	Rangers	Falkirk
12:00 BST	Broggio 6'; Yeats 26'; Henderson (yellow card) 41'; Miller 70' (pen.); Tait (yellow card) 80'; Donaldson (yellow card) 80'	Report	Meghoma (yellow card) 32'; Chukwuani 42'; Chermiti 47', 74'; Raskin 52', (yellow card) 80'; Miovski 58', 88'; Tavernier (yellow card) 68'; Aarons (yellow card) 72'	Stadium: Falkirk Stadium; Attendance: 7,750; Referee: Don Robertson

26 April 2026 34	Rangers	2–3	Motherwell	Glasgow
15:00 BST	Chermiti 51'; Raskin 70'; Sterling (yellow card) 71'	Report	Fadinger 16'; Longelo 25', 90', (yellow card) 33'; Slattery (yellow card) 71'	Stadium: Ibrox Stadium; Attendance: 50,970; Referee: Kevin Clancy

4 May 2026 35	Heart of Midlothian	2–1	Rangers	Edinburgh
17:30 BST	Kingsley 54'; Shankland 71', (yellow card) 37'	Report	Sterling 23'; Diomande (yellow card) 72'; Fernandez (yellow card) 80'	Stadium: Tynecastle Park; Attendance: 18,831; Referee: John Beaton

10 May 2026 36	Celtic	3–1	Rangers	Glasgow
12:00 BST	Yang 23'; Johnston (yellow card) 39'; Maeda 53', 57', (yellow card) 82'; Trusty (yellow card) 67'; Tierney (yellow card) 78'; Scales (yellow card) 79'; Hatate (yellow card) 89'	Report	Moore 9'; Chermiti (yellow card) 19'; Rommens (yellow card) 78'	Stadium: Celtic Park; Attendance: 58,714; Referee: Nick Walsh

13 May 2026 37	Rangers	1–2	Hibernian	Glasgow
20:00 BST	Aasgaard 41'; Barron (yellow card) 52'; Djiga (yellow card) 86'	Report	Boyle 5'; O'Hora (yellow card) 39'; Obita (yellow card) 74'; Scarlett 89'	Stadium: Ibrox Stadium; Attendance: 50,633; Referee: Matthew MacDermid

16 May 2026 38	Falkirk	2–5	Rangers	Falkirk
12:30 BST	Butland 7' (o.g.); Cartwright (yellow card) 20'; Spencer (yellow card) 26'; Miller (yellow card) 32', (goal) 44' (pen.)	Report	Chermiti 2', 6', 47'; Gassama 27'; Aasgaard 79' (pen.)	Stadium: Falkirk Stadium; Attendance: 7,148; Referee: Duncan Nicolson

=== Scottish Cup ===
16 January 2026 Fourth round	Rangers	5–0	Annan Athletic	Glasgow
19:45 GMT	Miovski 12', 32', 74' (pen.); Dowell 48'; Aasgaard 87'	Report	Scott (yellow card) 86'	Stadium: Ibrox Stadium; Attendance: 37,528; Referee: Duncan Nicolson

8 February 2026 Fifth round	Rangers	8–0	Queen's Park	Glasgow
14:00 GMT	Naderi 8', 49'; Tavernier 18', 26', 39' (pen.); Shiels 43' (o.g.); Antman (yellow card) 76'; Miovski 80'; Chukwuani 90'	Report	McLeish (yellow card) 86'	Stadium: Ibrox Stadium; Attendance: 36,190; Referee: Ross Hardie

8 March 2026 Quarter-final	Rangers	0–0 (a.e.t.) (2–4 p)	Celtic	Glasgow
13:00 GMT	Diomande (yellow card) 2'; Rommens (yellow card) 55'; Sterling (yellow card) 67'	Report	Scales (yellow card) 22'; Hatate (yellow card) 84'; Bernardo (yellow card) 111'; Araujo (yellow card) 116'	Stadium: Ibrox Stadium; Attendance: 51,215; Referee: Don Robertson
	Penalties
	Tavernier (penalty missed); Bajrami (penalty scored); Naderi (penalty scored); Gassama (penalty missed)		(penalty scored) Oxlade-Chamberlain; (penalty scored) Trusty; (penalty scored) Hatate; (penalty scored) Čvančara
Note: At the conclusion of the penalty shootout, there was a violent pitch invasion involving fans from both clubs, resulting in multiple arrests by police.

=== Scottish League Cup ===
16 August 2025 Second round	Rangers	4–2	Alloa Athletic	Glasgow
17:45 BST	Bajrami 13'; Fernandez 28'; Tavernier 67' (pen.); Barron (yellow card) 78'; Curtis 90'	Report	Rothwell 25' (o.g.); O'Donnell (yellow card) 67'; Taggart 80'; Hetherington (yellow card) 88'; Devine (yellow card) 90+3'	Stadium: Ibrox Stadium; Attendance: 33,949; Referee: Dan McFarlane

20 September 2025 Quarter-final	Rangers	2–0	Hibernian	Glasgow
17:45 BST	Raskin 42'; Miovski 45+2'; Tavernier (yellow card) 56'; Diomande (yellow card) 57'; Barron (yellow card) 78'	Report	Chaiwa (yellow card) 69'; Hoilett (yellow card) 82'	Stadium: Ibrox Stadium; Attendance: 34,682; Referee: Nick Walsh

2 November 2025 Semi-final	Celtic	3–1 (a.e.t.)	Rangers	Glasgow
14:00 GMT	Kenny 25'; Trusty (yellow card) 45+3'; Ralston (yellow card) 51'; Maeda (yellow card) 57'; McGregor (yellow card) 62', (goal) 93'; Engels (yellow card) 66'; Osmand 109', (yellow card) 111'	Report	Cornelius (yellow card) 24'; Aasgaard (red card) 38'; Raskin (yellow card) 73'; Tavernier 81' (pen.); Souttar (yellow card) 105'	Stadium: Hampden Park; Attendance: 49,446; Referee: Nick Walsh

=== UEFA Champions League ===
==== Second qualifying round ====
22 July 2025 First leg	Rangers (Scotland)	2–0	(Greece) Panathinaikos	Glasgow, Scotland
19:45 BST (UTC+1)	Raskin (yellow card) 8'; Souttar (yellow card) 28'; Curtis 52'; Gassama 78'	Report	Vagiannidis (yellow card) 23' (yellow-red card) 58'	Stadium: Ibrox Stadium; Attendance: 49,548; Referee: Donatas Rumšas (Lithuania)

30 July 2025 Second leg	Panathinaikos (Greece)	1–1 (1–3 agg.)	(Scotland) Rangers	Athens, Greece
21:00 EEST (UTC+3)	Đuričić 53'; Bakasetas (yellow card) 61'	Report	Dowell (yellow card) 45+3'; Gassama 60', (yellow card) 61'	Stadium: Olympic Stadium; Attendance: 36,121; Referee: Simone Sozza (Italy)

==== Third qualifying round ====
5 August 2025 First leg	Rangers (Scotland)	3–0	(Czech Republic) Viktoria Plzeň	Glasgow, Scotland
19:45 BST (UTC+1)	Gassama 15', 51'; Raskin (yellow card) 31'; Jefté (yellow card) 41'; Dessers 45' (pen.)	Report	Marković (yellow card) 19'; Valenta (yellow card) 87'	Stadium: Ibrox Stadium; Attendance: 45,730; Referee: Clément Turpin (France)

12 August 2025 Second leg	Viktoria Plzeň (Czech Republic)	2–1 (2–4 agg.)	(Scotland) Rangers	Plzeň, Czech Republic
19:00 CEST (UTC+2)	Paluska (yellow card) 29'; Durosinmi 41'; Marković 83'	Report	Gassama (yellow card) 7'; Cameron 60'; Djiga (yellow card) 84'	Stadium: Doosan Arena; Attendance: 11,341; Referee: Szymon Marciniak (Poland)

==== Play-off round ====
19 August 2025 First leg	Rangers (Scotland)	1–3	(Belgium) Club Brugge	Glasgow, Scotland
20:00 BST (UTC+1)	Danilo 50'; Souttar (yellow card) 74'; Aarons (yellow card) 75'; Aasgaard (yellow card) 90+2'	Report	Vermant 3'; Spileers 7'; Mechele 20'; Sabbe (yellow card) 52'	Stadium: Ibrox Stadium; Attendance: 43,731; Referee: François Letexier (France)

27 August 2025 Second leg	Club Brugge (Belgium)	6–0 (9–1 agg.)	(Scotland) Rangers	Bruges, Belgium
21:00 CEST (UTC+2)	Tresoldi 5'; Vanaken 32'; Seys 41', 45'; Stanković 45+2'; Tzolis 50'; Nilsson (yellow card) 84'	Report	Meghoma (yellow card) 3'; Aarons (red card) 8'	Stadium: Jan Breydel Stadium; Attendance: 26,252; Referee: Felix Zwayer (Germany)

=== UEFA Europa League ===
==== League phase ====
Pos	Team	Pld	W	D	L	GF	GA	GD	Pts
30	(Swiss Football Association) Basel	8	2	0	6	9	13	−4	6
31	(Austrian Football Association) Red Bull Salzburg	8	2	0	6	10	15	−5	6
32	(Scottish Football Association) Rangers	8	1	1	6	5	14	−9	4
33	(French Football Federation) Nice	8	1	0	7	7	15	−8	3
34	(Royal Dutch Football Association) Utrecht	8	0	1	7	5	15	−10	1

Source: UEFA
Rules for classification: League phase tiebreakers

Round	1	2	3	4	5	6	7	8
Ground	H	A	A	H	H	A	H	A
Result	L	L	L	L	D	L	W	L
Position	28	32	36	36	33	33	31	32
Points	0	0	0	0	1	1	4	4

Source: UEFA
A = Away; H = Home; W = Win; D = Draw; L = Loss

25 September 2025 1	Rangers (Scotland)	0–1	(Belgium) Genk	Glasgow, Scotland
20:00 BST (UTC+1)	Diomande (red card) 41'; Gassama (yellow card) 78'	Report	Oh (penalty missed) 45+6', 55', (yellow card) 56'; Sadick (yellow card) 57'; El Ouahdi (yellow card) 90+4'	Stadium: Ibrox Stadium; Attendance: 37,898; Referee: Matej Jug (Slovenia)

2 October 2025 2	Sturm Graz (Austria)	2–1	(Scotland) Rangers	Graz, Austria
21:00 CEST (UTC+2)	Horvat 7'; Kiteishvili 35'; Oermann (yellow card) 68'; Karić (yellow card) 90+4'	Report	Gassama 49'; Cornelius (yellow card) 75'	Stadium: Liebenauer Stadium; Attendance: 15,532; Referee: Halil Umut Meler (Turkey)

23 October 2025 3	Brann (Norway)	3–0	(Scotland) Rangers	Bergen, Norway
18:45 CEST (UTC+2)	Kornvig 40'; Sørensen 55'; Pedersen (yellow card) 75'; Holm 79'	Report	Gassama (yellow card) 36'; Souttar (yellow card) 77'	Stadium: Brann Stadion; Attendance: 15,800; Referee: Vassilis Fotias (Greece)

6 November 2025 4	Rangers (Scotland)	0–2	(Italy) Roma	Glasgow, Scotland
20:00 GMT (UTC+0)		Report	Soulé 13'; Pellegrini 36'	Stadium: Ibrox Stadium; Attendance: 41,847; Referee: Morten Krogh (Denmark)

27 November 2025 5	Rangers (Scotland)	1–1	(Portugal) Braga	Glasgow, Scotland
20:00 GMT (UTC+0)	Tavernier 45+3' (pen.); Diomande (yellow card) 45+4' (yellow-red card) 90+5'; Barron (yellow card) 58'	Report	Navarro (yellow card) 41'; Zalazar (red card) 61'; Martínez 69', (yellow card) 77'; Gómez (yellow card) 90+6'	Stadium: Ibrox Stadium; Attendance: 38,014; Referee: Allard Lindhout (Netherlands)

11 December 2025 6	Ferencváros (Hungary)	2–1	(Scotland) Rangers	Budapest, Hungary
18:45 CET (UTC+1)	Ötvös 45+5'; Varga 72'; Joseph (yellow card) 77'	Report	Miovski 27'; Aarons (yellow card) 43'; Djiga (yellow card) 79'	Stadium: Ferencváros Stadion; Attendance: 19,567; Referee: Anastasios Papapetrou (Greece)

22 January 2026 7	Rangers (Scotland)	1–0	(Bulgaria) Ludogorets Razgrad	Glasgow, Scotland
20:00 GMT (UTC+0)	Diomande 33'; Chermiti (yellow card) 55'; Moore (yellow card) 61'; Fernandez (yellow card) 81'; Aarons (yellow card) 83'; Raskin (yellow card) 88'; Curtis (yellow card) 90+3'	Report	Bonmann (yellow card) 90+3'	Stadium: Ibrox Stadium; Attendance: 37,105; Referee: Manfredas Lukjančukas (Lithuania)

29 January 2026 8	Porto (Portugal)	3–1	(Scotland) Rangers	Porto, Portugal
21:00 WET (UTC+0)	Mora 27'; Moura 36'; Fernandez 41' (o.g.)	Report	Gassama 6'; Aarons (yellow card) 50'	Stadium: Estádio do Dragão; Attendance: 38,213; Referee: Jasper Vergoote (Belgium)

== Club ==
=== First team staff ===
Name	Role
Head coach	(Scotland) Russell Martin (until October 5, 2025) (Germany) Danny Röhl (from October 20, 2025)
Assistant coach	(England) Matt Gill (until October 5, 2025) (Germany) Matthias Kaltenbach (from October 22, 2025)
First team coach	(England) Mike Williamson (until October 5, 2025)
Goalkeeping coach	(England) Sal Bibbo
Performance coaches	(England) Rhys Owen (Germany) Sascha Lense (from October 22, 2025)

=== Awards ===
N	P	Nat.	Name	Award	Date	From	Source
	MAN	(Germany)	Danny Röhl	Premiership Manager of the Month	January	Scottish Professional Football League	
9	FW	(Portugal)	Youssef Chermiti	Premiership Player of the Month	February	Scottish Professional Football League	
47	MF	(England)	Mikey Moore	PFA Scotland Young Player of the Year	2025–26	PFA Scotland	

== Squad statistics ==
The table below includes all players registered with the SPFL as part of the Rangers squad for the 2025–26 season. They may not have made an appearance.

=== Appearances and goals ===
No.	Pos.	Nat.	Name	Totals		Scottish Premiership		Scottish Cup		League Cup		Champions League		Europa League	
No.	Pos.	Nat.	Name	Apps	Goals	Apps	Goals	Apps	Goals	Apps	Goals	Apps	Goals	Apps	Goals
Goalkeepers
1	GK	(England) ENG	Jack Butland	55	0	38	0	1	0	2	0	6	0	8	0
31	GK	(Scotland) SCO	Liam Kelly	3	0	0	0	2	0	1	0	0	0	0	0
32	GK	(Scotland) SCO	Kieran Wright	0	0	0	0	0	0	0	0	0	0	0	0
Defenders
2	DF	(England) ENG	James Tavernier (captain)	52	14	25+9	8	1+1	3	2+1	2	3+3	0	7	1
3	DF	(England) ENG	Max Aarons	35	1	8+13	1	1	0	1+1	0	5	0	5+1	0
5	DF	(Scotland) SCO	John Souttar	38	0	23+1	0	0+1	0	2	0	6	0	4+1	0
13	DF	(Canada) CAN	Derek Cornelius	12	1	6+1	1	0	0	2	0	0	0	2+1	0
21	DF	(England) ENG	Dujon Sterling	17	2	11+3	2	2	0	0	0	0	0	0+1	0
24	DF	(Burkina Faso) BFA	Nasser Djiga	42	0	23+2	0	3	0	2	0	6	0	6	0
25	DF	(Belgium) BEL	Tuur Rommens	12	1	8+2	1	2	0	0	0	0	0	0	0
30	DF	(England) ENG	Jayden Meghoma	44	1	25+4	1	1+2	0	2	0	2	0	7+1	0
37	DF	(Nigeria) NGR	Emmanuel Fernandez	33	6	25+2	5	1	0	1	1	0	0	4	0
82	DF	(Scotland) SCO	Ashton Scally	1	0	0+1	0	0	0	0	0	0	0	0	0
Midfielders
8	MF	(Scotland) SCO	Connor Barron	37	0	16+11	0	0	0	0+1+1	0	0+2	0	4+2	0
10	MF	(Ivory Coast) CIV	Mohamed Diomande	46	2	20+11	1	2	0	2	0	5+1	0	4+1	1
11	MF	(Norway) NOR	Thelo Aasgaard	48	8	21+12	7	0+2	1	2+1	0	1+1	0	4+4	0
14	MF	(Albania) ALB	Nedim Bajrami	19	2	3+9	1	0+2	0	1+1	1	0+3	0	0	0
42	MF	(Denmark) DEN	Tochi Chukwuani	18	3	13+2	2	1+2	1	0	0	0	0	0	0
43	MF	(Belgium) BEL	Nicolas Raskin	50	7	31+2	6	1	0	2	1	4+2	0	8	0
47	MF	(England) ENG	Mikey Moore	47	7	25+8	7	1+2	0	2+1	0	0+1	0	3+4	0
49	MF	(Scotland) SCO	Bailey Rice	1	0	0	0	0	0	1	0	0	0	0	0
64	MF	(Scotland) SCO	Aiden McCallion	1	0	0+1	0	0	0	0	0	0	0	0	0
Forwards
7	FW	(Denmark) DEN	Andreas Skov Olsen	11	1	7+2	1	2	0	0	0	0	0	0	0
9	FW	(Portugal) POR	Youssef Chermiti	41	15	20+10	15	1	0	1+1	0	0	0	7+1	0
18	FW	(Finland) FIN	Oliver Antman	29	1	10+7	1	1	0	0+2	0	4	0	2+3	0
20	FW	(Germany) GER	Ryan Naderi	11	3	5+4	1	2	2	0	0	0	0	0	0
23	FW	(Mauritania) MTN	Djeidi Gassama	56	9	26+12	3	1+1	0	1+1	0	4+2	4	8	2
28	FW	(North Macedonia) MKD	Bojan Miovski	42	13	14+16	7	2	4	1+1	1	0	0	1+7	1
46	FW	(England) ENG	Zebedee Lawson	2	0	0+1	0	0+1	0	0	0	0	0	0	0
Players transferred or loaned out during the season who made an appearance
6	MF	(England) ENG	Joe Rothwell	20	0	5+3	0	1	0	1+1	0	5+1	0	1+2	0
7	FW	(Colombia) COL	Óscar Cortés	3	0	0+1	0	0	0	1	0	0+1	0	0	0
9	FW	(Nigeria) NGR	Cyriel Dessers	7	1	1+2	0	0	0	0	0	2+2	1	0	0
16	MF	(Scotland) SCO	Lyall Cameron	10	1	2+4	0	0	0	0	0	3+1	1	0	0
17	FW	(Wales) WAL	Rabbi Matondo	3	0	0+1	0	0+2	0	0	0	0	0	0	0
19	DF	(France) FRA	Clinton Nsiala	4	0	0+3	0	1	0	0	0	0	0	0	0
20	MF	(England) ENG	Kieran Dowell	7	1	1+1	0	1	1	1	0	2+1	0	0	0
22	DF	(Brazil) BRA	Jefté	4	0	1	0	0	0	0	0	2+1	0	0	0
29	FW	(Morocco) MAR	Hamza Igamane	3	0	0	0	0	0	0+1	0	0+2	0	0	0
52	MF	(Scotland) SCO	Findlay Curtis	21	3	1+9	1	1	0	0+2	1	2+2	1	1+3	0
99	FW	(Brazil) BRA	Danilo	28	4	6+8	3	1	0	2	0	4+2	1	2+3	0

- Last updated: 16 May 2026

Appearances (starts and substitute appearances) and goals include those in Scottish Premiership, Scottish Cup, Scottish League Cup and UEFA Champions League.

=== Discipline ===
==== Yellow cards ====
As of match played on 16 May 2026

Colour	Player	Cards
Yellow card
Yellow card	Nicolas Raskin	11
Yellow card	John Souttar	11
Yellow card	Mohamed Diomande	9
Yellow card	Connor Barron	8
Yellow card	Nasser Djiga	8
Yellow card	Djeidi Gassama	8
Yellow card	Max Aarons	7
Yellow card	James Tavernier	6
Yellow card	Thelo Aasgaard	5
Yellow card	Youssef Chermiti	5
Yellow card	Jayden Meghoma	5
Yellow card	Derek Cornelius	3
Yellow card	Emmanuel Fernandez	3
Yellow card	Bojan Miovski	3
Yellow card	Mikey Moore	3
Yellow card	Dujon Sterling	3
Yellow card	Oliver Antman	2
Yellow card	Nedim Bajrami	2
Yellow card	Kieran Dowell	2
Yellow card	Tuur Rommens	2
Yellow card	Jack Butland	1
Yellow card	Lyall Cameron	1
Yellow card	Findlay Curtis	1
Yellow card	Cyriel Dessers	1
Yellow card	Jefté	1
Yellow card	Andreas Skov Olsen	1

==== Red cards ====
As of match played on 16 May 2026

Colour	Player	Cards
Red card
Red card	Mohamed Diomande	2
Red card	Max Aarons	1
Red card	Thelo Aasgaard	1
Red card	Nasser Djiga	1

=== Clean sheets ===
As of match played on 16 May 2026

No.	Player	Scottish Premiership	Scottish Cup	League Cup	Champions League	Europa League	Total	Appearances
1	Jack Butland	12	1	1	2	1	17	55
31	Liam Kelly	0	2	0	0	0	2	3
32	Kieran Wright	0	0	0	0	0	0	0
Total		12	3	1	2	1	19	58
