= Ashton Scally =

Scottish footballer (born 2010

Personal information
- Date of birth: 18 April 2010 (age 16)
- Place of birth: Paisley, Scotland
- Height: 1.84 m (6 ft 0 in)
- Position: Defender (Left-Back)

Team information
- Current team: Rangers
- Number: 82

Youth career
- Gleniffer Thistle
- Rangers

Senior career*
Years	Team	Apps	(Gls)
2026–	Rangers	1	(0)

International career^{‡}
2024–2025	Scotland U15	5	(0)
- * Club domestic league appearances and goals ‡ National team caps and goals as of 1 May 2025

Ashton Scally (born 18 April 2010) is a Scottish professional footballer who plays as a defender for Rangers.

== Early life ==
Scally was born on 18 April 2010. Born in Paisley, Scotland, he is the son of former Scottish footballer Neil Scally now a football coach at Clyde.

== Club career ==
As a youth player, Scally joined the youth academy of Gleniffer Thistle.

Following his stint there, he joined the youth academy of Rangers. He is one of several prospects developed through the Rangers Academy's integration with Boclair Academy. This programme provides a full-time environment where young players train daily at the Rangers Training Centre while completing their secondary education and a pathway to pro as the school serves as a primary academic base for the club's "schoolboy" contract players, helping them transition into full-time professional football upon turning 16.

Rangers manager Danny Röhl expressed his disappointed at being unable to play Scally and his teammate Kyle Glasgow in a Scottish Cup fixture against Annan Athletic in January 2026 due to SFA age-related regulations, even though they had featured for Rangers B earlier in the season. While Scally and Glasgow had featured in development and Challenge Cup fixtures, the SFA’s regulations prevented them from taking part in senior competitive matches in the Scottish Premiership, Scottish League Cup and Scottish Cup until they turned 16.

He signed his first professional contract on 21 April 2026, saying that he was 'happy to put pen to paper and excited to see what the future beholds.' He joined the first-team on a warm-weather training camp in Spain alongside goalkeeper Rydnn McGuire. He later said that it was a 'good opportunity away with the first team.'

Scally made his Rangers debut on 16 May 2025 against Falkirk in the Scottish Premiership at the age of 16 years and 28 days, becoming the youngest ever league debutant for Rangers, surpassing Bailey Rice's record of 16 years and 137 days. He came on as an 80th minute substitute for Tuur Rommens, along with fellow academy teammates Aiden McCallion and Zebedee Lawson. He said after the game that it was a 'surreal experience' and there was 'hopefully more to come.' He also mentioned 'what a 24 hours it's been' referencing the fact that he had won both the CAS Elite U17 and U19 League titles just the day before, lifting them at Ibrox.

== International career ==
Scally is a Scotland youth international. On 29 September 2024, he debuted for the Scotland national under-15 football team during a 1–1 away friendly draw with the Greece national under-15 football team.
