= Rangers F.C. B Team and Academy =

Rangers Academy
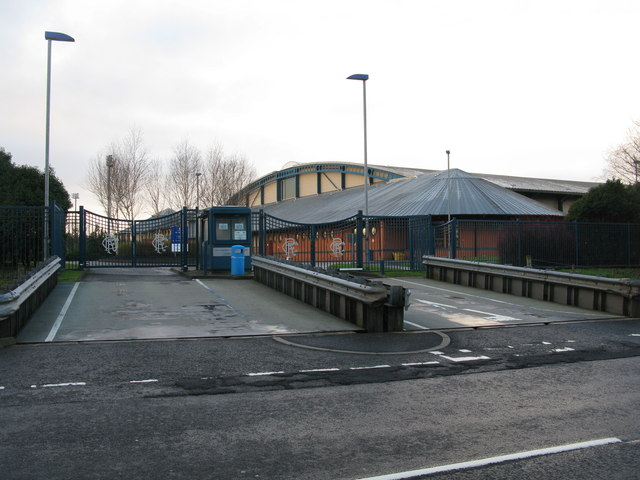
- Full name: Rangers Football Club Academy
- Nickname: Rangers Colts
- Ground: Rangers Training Centre, Milngavie
- Website: www.rangers.co.uk
Home colours	Away colours	Third colours

In addition to their senior squad, Rangers Football Club also operates a football academy which contains a number of football teams culminating in an under-19 side, which plays in the Club Academy Scotland Under-19 league and plays challenge matches against various domestic and European sides in accordance with the academy's development plan, having declined the option to continue in the SPFL Reserve League despite winning the competition in 2019. The side also takes part in the Scottish Challenge Cup and the Glasgow Cup.

In the 2006–07 season, the club's under-20 side won their league and the Scottish Youth Cup, ending rivals Celtic's run of six consecutive league titles and defeating them 5–0 in the final of the Youth Cup at Hampden Park. In 2019, the Rangers under-18 team qualified for the UEFA Youth League for the first time. Historically, the club's second side was known as the Rangers Swifts.

== History ==
=== Beginnings of reserve football ===
Rangers' first known involvement in reserve league football was in 1895 when their club secretary William Wilton initiated the setting up of the Scottish Reserve League. The competition comprised the reserve sides of five clubs; Rangers, Celtic, Hearts, Leith Athletic and the Queens Park Strollers. In July 1896 the league was expanded to 10 sides, and renamed the Scottish Combination league. In 1909, a new Scottish Reserve League was set up, often including at least one non-reserve side of a non-league club in each of its seasons. The league was disbanded during World War I, but effectively re-established in 1919 as the Scottish Alliance League. As with previous incarnations, this reserve league also contained the first XI of several non-league sides. An AGM in 1938, resulted in the non-league sides being removed and the league became exclusive to First Division reserve sides. The advent of World War II, however, once again saw the suspension of national reserve league football in Scotland, although regional leagues were set up.

=== Inter war years ===
Upon the outbreak of the Second World War, all competitive football in Scotland was suspended. During this time there was special wartime football in the form of regional league competitions with Rangers playing in the Southern League. The regionalisation also saw Scottish reserve football postponed as the war effort put a major strain on the resources and playing staff of clubs with many of them serving in the Armed forces and some seeing active service abroad. The reserve side were crowned champions of their league in 1939 before seeing the following season abandoned.

=== 1975 league reconstruction ===
With the end of hostilities in 1946, Rangers returned to play competitive football again with the reserve side featuring in the Scottish Reserve League. This was to continue unchanged for almost three decades until the first of many reconstructions were made to football in Scotland.

=== SPL breakaway ===
The formation of the Scottish Premier League in 1998, resulted in a significant change in youth team football in Scotland. The SPL began a league for members clubs youth players aged under-18. This was alongside the Reserve league, which had been revamped into a league primarily for under-21 players. Rangers would go on to win the under-18 league three times, first in 2001–02 then in 2006–07 and most recently in 2007–08.

=== Reconstructing the youth department ===
The opening of Rangers Training Centre (known as Murray Park) in 2001 was one of the first stages in the club's move to develop a football academy. Although the nomenclature was not present at that time, Rangers did begin to focus upon youth development and under the then first-team manager Dick Advocaat the club appointed its first Head of Youth Development, Jan Derks, in March 2000. Derks new role was strategic and operational and saw him lay the foundations for the club's academy as well as helping the transition of the youth set-up to the new training centre. Prior to this, the club had employed a youth development officer, with their focus being solely scouting and coaching. Derks remained in position for three years despite former player Tommy McLean being recruited as his presumptive successor in May 2001 and Rangers eventually appointed former Aberdeen scout George Adams to succeed Derks in February 2003.

As the scope of the youth department grew, so did its costs, so on 20 April 2004, Rangers announced the creation of a new company which would oversee the development of the club's youth players. The company, named Rangers Youth Development Limited, was entirely self-funding but completely owned by the club. It attracted four investors from outside Rangers who have invested £1 million, with the club also putting up an initial £2.5 million. It led to Rangers F.C. being in the unfamiliar position of buying its own youth players from Rangers Youth Development Ltd. The Youth Development company owned the young players and the club had to bid for them, although it had first option on all the players. If both sides cannot reach an agreement on a transfer fee then a FIFA transfer model will be used. Any profit made by the company will be divided between investors with the majority being invested to fund more youth players. The main reason for the formation of the company was to offset the running costs of the club's training centre. However, many of the Rangers fans were opposed to the formation of the new company. The activities of Rangers Youth Development Ltd were largely unnoticed and the company was dissolved after submitting its final set of accounts in June 2010.

=== The elite development era ===
In September 2005, as part of a restructuring of the club management, Adams left his role as director of youth football. The moves also saw future Academy heads take over responsibility for youth administration. In May 2017, the club announced its intention to withdraw from the SPFL Development League and play a programme of matches against a mixture of English and European Academies, as well as sides from League One and League Two in Scotland.

In July 2018, it was reported that reserve leagues would be reintroduced in lieu of the development leagues that had been in place since 2009. The top tier of the new SPFL Reserve League featured 18 clubs, whilst a second-tier reserve League comprised nine clubs. Other than a minimum age of 16, no age restrictions applied to the leagues. At the end of its first season (2018–19) which Rangers entered and won, the club – along with several others – intimated that they would withdraw from the Reserve League to play a variety of challenge matches, in a similar manner as two years earlier. They later entered a small league (under-21 plus three overage) along with three other Scottish clubs and Brentford and Huddersfield Town from the English leagues.

In May 2021, it was reported that Rangers (and Celtic) were in 'productive' talks with the Lowland Football League (the fifth tier of the senior setup) to have colt teams playing in their division for the following season, with an earlier proposal to include them in an expanded Scottish League Two (fourth tier) still under consideration by the SPFL for the year after that.

== Academy structure ==
The Academy is responsible for providing players for the Rangers first-team and is divided into four areas. Between under-11 and under-12 level, the teams play in a seven-a-side football competition, although the latter side transitions to 11-a-side after Christmas. Thereafter, the under-12s and under-13s play on a modified pitch which is slightly smaller with reduced sized goals than regulation play but from under-14 level onward all Academy teams play on normal pitches. All players from under-8 to under-15 are schoolboys, however, from Senior level many sign contracts to become professional youth players. The U11 to U17 age groups play in the SFA Club Academy Scotland programme at ‘Elite’ level.

In 2017, the Rangers academy was one of eight across the country designated 'elite' status on the introduction of Project Brave, an SFA initiative to concentrate the development of the best young players at a smaller number of clubs with high quality facilities and coaching than was previously the case.

== Academy partnerships ==
Rangers operate a North American Academy, which began in 2014, and have thirteen partner clubs across the United States and Canada.

The academy has a partnership with Coerver Coaching who deliver Coerver method skills coaching to the Children's section on a weekly basis. On 18 December 2015, Rangers announced a coaching and development partnership with Scottish Lowland League club Gala Fairydean Rovers which effectively saw the Galashiels side act as a feeder to Rangers. In June 2016, Rangers announced a partnership with East Dunbartonshire council which saw 24 of the club's youth players aged 11 to 15 attend Boclair Academy (located a short distance from the Auchenhowie complex) allowing them to combine their academic and football studies.

== Competition record ==
Rangers were members of the Scottish Premier Reserve League from its foundation in the 1998–99 season until 2012. As the Scottish Premier League was considering disbanding its Scottish Premier Reserve League for the 2009–10 season, Rangers announced it was withdrawing its reserve team in order to play friendly games instead. After Rangers demotion to the Scottish Third Division in 2012, the club entered a reserve team into the Scottish Football League Reserve League and the side went on to win the competition. The league ended after the formation of the SPFL, with a development league for under-20's teams taking its place and the club's reserve side was disbanded.

A youth league was founded for under-18s in 1998 as an alternative to the Scottish Premier Reserve League which originally was for under-21s. The former competition was widened to include under-19s in 2003. Rangers were removed from the under-19 league after the club's demotion to the Scottish Third Division in 2012, with youth players featuring in the 2012-13 SFL Reserve league instead. The formation of the Scottish Professional Football League in the 2013–14 season, saw the formation of an under-20s league with the number of teams increased to 16 and teams were allowed to field two over-age outfield players and an overage goalkeeper. The league was renamed the SPFL Development League in 2014, with the number of teams increased to 17.

Rangers youth sides play in a number of cup competitions including the Glasgow Cup and Scottish Youth Cup. From 2015 onwards it is also possible for the Academy to participate in the UEFA Youth League by the Under-18 side winning the previous season's league at that age level, or by the senior team reaching the UEFA Champions League group stages; this was achieved in 2019 via the first route. In the 2019–20 UEFA Youth League, Rangers defeated BSC Young Boys of Switzerland in the opening round on away goals after a 5–5 result on aggregate, and eliminated Slovakians Slovan Bratislava 4–1 in the next.

In June 2016, it was announced by the SPFL that the Challenge Cup would be expanded to include teams from the Welsh Premier League, Northern Irish Premiership and an Under-20s side from each Scottish Premiership club. In the 2016–17 edition, Rangers U20 won their opening tie against Stirling University F.C. of the Lowland League (Note: Home ties in the Scottish Challenge Cup have been played at Forthbank Stadium in Stirling and Firhill Stadium in Glasgow.) but lost in the next round to Stenhousemuir of the third level. In the 2019–20 edition, they travelled to Northern Ireland and defeated Ballymena United who had been NIFL runners-up in the previous season, then knocked out Solihull Moors of the English National League, again away from home, this time on penalties. In the quarter-finals, they beat Wrexham from the same league at Ibrox, with many of the same players also involved in a 5–0 win over Celtic in the Scottish Youth Cup a few days earlier and in the Youth League victory over Slovan ten days later. They were drawn away to Inverness CT in the semi-finals, meaning the Wrexham match would be their only home fixture in the competition, with two ties in England, one in Northern Ireland and one in the Scottish Highlands 170 kilometres (110 mi) from Glasgow. They lost 2–1 to Inverness, but also set a new record by going further than any reserve side had previously gone in the competition. A few days earlier, Rangers' run in the UEFA Youth League also came to an end with a 4–0 defeat to Atlético Madrid.

=== League participation ===
Rangers F.C. Reserve team
Seasons	Division
1890 – 1975	Scottish Reserve League
1975 – 1998	Premier Reserve League
1998 – 2009	Scottish Premier Reserve League
2009 – 2012	None
2012 – 2013	SFL Reserve League
2018 – 2019	SPFL Reserve League

Rangers F.C. professional youth team
Seasons	Division
1998 – 2003	Scottish Premier under-18 League
2003 – 2012	Scottish Premier under-19 League
2012 – 2013	None
2013 – 2014	SPFL under-20 League
2014 – 2017	SPFL Development League

Rangers F.C. B team
Seasons	Division
2021 – 2023	Lowland Football League

Cup competitions
Team	Competition
Under–19s	Glasgow Cup
Under–19s	Scottish Challenge Cup
Under–17s	Scottish Youth Cup

== Players ==
- In addition to below, Rangers F.C. Academy also operates youth sides from under-11 upwards.
- Please note that squad numbers listed relate only to first team numbers. In youth matches the team wear 1-11 and 12-21 (21 worn in place of 13) on the bench.
- Academy players on a straight domestic loan can still feature for the youth team, but cannot play for the first team. Players on a co-operation loan can play for the first team and youth team.

=== Squad ===
As of 1 July 2026

Note: Flags indicate national team as defined under FIFA eligibility rules; some limited exceptions apply. Players may hold more than one non-FIFA nationality.

No.	Pos.	Nation	Player
33	DF	SCO	Ashton Scally
41	DF	SCO	Zander Hutton
44	DF	SCO	Arran Kerr
46	MF	SCO	Calum Adamson
47	FW	WAL	Josh Gentles
50	GK	SCO	Greig Thackray
51	GK	SCO	Rydnn McGuire
55	DF	SCO	Jack Wyllie
56	FW	ENG	Zebedee Lawson
58	DF	SCO	Conor Owen
59	MF	NIR	Callum Burnside
60	DF	SCO	Lyle Wark
61	MF	SCO	Lewis Stewart
62	MF	SCO	Alexander Smith
63	DF	SCO	Ashton Patton
64	MF	SCO	Aiden McCallion
65	DF	SCO	Jack Caldwell
66	MF	SCO	Cameron Fernie
67	DF	SCO	Ben Hutton
68	MF	SCO	Aiden Crilly
69	DF	SCO	Oliver Hynd
70	FW	SCO	Max Cameron
71	MF	SCO	Coben Fergusson
72	MF	SCO	Kyle Glasgow
73	FW	SCO	Ruaridh Hall
74	GK	SCO	Jaden Milarvie
75	MF	SCO	Luca Rankin

No.	Pos.	Nation	Player
76	GK	SCO	Sam Reid
77	DF	SCO	Calum Young
93	FW	SCO	Cormac Christie
—	GK	SCO	Baxter Anderson
—	GK	SCO	Igor Mames
—	DF	SCO	Nathan Brown
—	DF	SCO	Rudy Cash
—	DF	SCO	Ollie Johnston
—	DF	SCO	Max Morris
—	DF	SCO	Corey Ngwenya
—	DF	ENG	David Odunukan
—	DF	SCO	Luke Ramage
—	DF	SCO	James Reid
—	DF	SCO	Kai Urban
—	MF	SCO	Riley Bryson
—	MF	SCO	Harry Collins
—	MF	SCO	Otis Henderson
—	MF	SCO	Jay Kilbane
—	MF	SCO	Ollie Masterton
—	MF	SCO	Ollie McGhee
—	MF	SCO	Cody Mensing
—	MF	SCO	Charlie Miller
—	MF	SCO	Ethan Molloy
—	FW	SCO	Jackson Barr
—	FW	SCO	Michael Ihmig
—	FW	SCO	Daniel Owoyomi

== Manager history ==
Rangers reserve side, in its various guises, has had several managers and coaches during its operation. For many years the long standing name of the second string was the Reserve team, however, due to internal restructuring it was more recently known as the Under-20 team, then the Development squad and currently B team. As consequently the title of the manager overseeing the team changed to reflect this. Below is a list of individuals who oversaw the reserve side since approximately 1983.

Name	From	To	Tenure	Title
(Scotland) John Hagart	November 1983	7 April 1986	2 years, 5 months	Reserves manager
(Scotland) Don Mackay	16 April 1986	3 February 1987	293 days	Reserves manager
(Scotland) Peter McCloy	3 February 1987	1 March 1987	26 days	Reserves coach
(Northern Ireland) Jimmy Nicholl	1 March 1987	30 June 1989	2 years, 121 days	Reserves coach
(Scotland) Davie Dodds and (Scotland) John McGregor	June 1989	October 1991	2 years, 4 months	Joint Reserves coaches
(Scotland) John McGregor	October 1991	1 March 2003	12 years	Reserves coach
(Scotland) John Brown	1 March 2003	27 June 2006	3 years, 118 days	Reserves coach
(Scotland) Ian Durrant	27 June 2006	30 June 2008	2 years, 3 days	Reserves coach
(Scotland) Tommy Wilson	30 June 2008	14 March 2013	4 years, 257 days	Reserves Manager
(Scotland) Billy Kirkwood (Interim)	14 March 2013	2 July 2013	110 days	Senior Academy manager
(Scotland) Gordon Durie	2 July 2013	23 December 2014	1 year, 174 days	Under-20s coach
(Scotland) Ian Durrant	23 December 2014	9 June 2016	1 year, 169 days	Under-20s coach
(Scotland) Graeme Murty	22 August 2016	26 October 2017	1 year, 65 days	Head Development squad coach
(Scotland) Billy Kirkwood (Interim)	26 October 2017	6 June 2018	223 days	Head Development Squad coach
(Scotland) Graeme Murty	6 June 2018	30 June 2020	2 years, 24 days	Head Development Squad coach
(Scotland) Kevin Thomson (Scotland) Brian Gilmour	30 June 2020	1 July 2021	1 year, 1 day	Joint B-Team coaches
(Scotland) David McCallum (Scotland) Brian Gilmour	1 July 2021	1 October 2023	3 years, 92 days	Joint B-Team coaches
(Scotland) David McCallum	1 October 2023		3 years, 43 days	B-Team coach

== Staff ==
As of 1 July 2026

Position	Name
Interim academy director	Brian Gilmour
Head of academy scouting	David Hopkin
Academy scouting executive	Cameron Dickson
Lead PDP performance coach	Steven Smith
PDP performance coach	Malky Thomson
Lead youth development phase and Boclair Academy coach	Greg Statt
Youth development phase coach	Lewis Macleod
Lead foundation phase coach	John Lawson
Goalkeeping coach	Alan Karas
Academy physiotherapists	Nicole Doak; Katie Gough; Tara Harvey
Academy performance analysts	Jake Boon; Kai Topgood
Academy manager girls & women’s department	Todd Lumsden
Soccer academies manager	Iain King

== Honours ==
=== League ===
- Scottish Reserve League: (22)
  - 1898, 1899, 1907, 1924, 1928, 1929, 1930, 1931, 1932, 1935, 1939, 1952, 1953, 1954, 1956, 1962, 1964, 1967, 1968, 1969, 1974, 1975
- Premier Reserve League: (11)
  - 1976, 1977, 1978, 1979, 1983, 1984, 1986, 1992, 1996, 1998
- Scottish Premier Reserve League:
  - 2001
- SPFL Reserve League:
  - 2019
- Scottish Football League Reserve League:
  - 2013
- SFL Youth League:
  - 1996
- SPL U-19/SPFL Development League: (3)
  - 2002, 2007, 2008
- Club Academy Scotland U-19 League:
  - 2026
- Club Academy Scotland U-18 League:
  - 2019, 2021
- Club Academy Scotland U-17 League:
  - 2026

=== Cup ===
- Scottish 2nd XI Cup: (24)
  - 1890, 1898, 1899, 1907, 1912, 1913, 1924, 1925, 1926, 1929, 1930, 1931, 1933, 1937, 1938, 1941, 1952, 1962, 1964, 1965, 1968, 1970, 1977, 1979
- Scottish Reserve League Cup: (12)
  - 1946, 1954, 1961, 1962, 1963, 1968, 1975, 1976, 1977, 1993, 1997, 1998
- Scottish Youth Cup: (9)
  - 1994, 1995, 2002, 2007, 2008, 2014, 2019, 2022, 2024
- Glasgow Cup: (16)
  - 1992, 1993, 1994, 1995, 1996, 1999, 2000, 2004, 2009, 2010, 2012, 2013, 2018, 2022, 2024, 2025
- Milk Cup: (2) (Premier)
  - 1984, 1992
- Milk Cup: (Junior)
  - 1985
- Festival Cup: (U-20)
  - 2002
- Iris Club International Tournament: (2) (U-19)
  - 1979, 1981
- Gothia Cup: (U-18)
  - 1987
- Alkass International Cup: (U-17)
  - 2019
- Club Academy Scotland U-16 League Cup:
  - 2022

== Academy legacy ==
=== Financial return ===
With the opening of the club's training facility for its youth and first teams, it was hoped that this would spell a new chapter in player development for the club. However, expectations of an instant success were not accurate and with reported running costs of the facility equalling £1.5m, many commentators asked if the investment in the training ground and youth department was worthwhile.

The combined transfer fees for all Academy graduates is, to date, approximately £30m. This includes the transfer of Nathan Patterson, the single largest fee received in the club's history for any player. Some of the other transfers that have commanded fees were in the form of compensation. The list below includes players who have been schooled at the club's Academy and have commanded a transfer upon their departure.

First-team graduates transfer fees received
#	Name and nationality	Date of transfer	New club	Initial fee	Add ons	Total fee
1	(Scotland) Steven MacLean	7 July 2004	Sheffield Wednesday (England)	£0.125m	✗	£0.125m
2	(Tunisia) Hamed Namouchi	31 August 2006	Lorient (France)	£0.5m	✗	£0.5m
3	(Scotland) Alan Hutton	30 January 2008	Tottenham Hotspur (England)	£9m	✗	£9m
4	(South Africa) Dean Furman	1 June 2009	Oldham Athletic (England)	£0.05m	✗	£0.05m
5	(Scotland) Charlie Adam	4 August 2009	Blackpool (England)	£0.5m	✓	£1.35m
6	(Scotland) Danny Wilson	21 July 2010	Liverpool (England)	£2m	✓	£4.7m
7	(Scotland) Dylan McGeouch	15 May 2011	Celtic (Scotland)	£0.1m	✗	£0.1m
8	(Norway) Thomas Kind Bendiksen	1 January 2012	Tromsø (Norway)	£0.25m	✗	£0.25m
9	(Scotland) Charlie Telfer	31 May 2014	Dundee United (Scotland)	£0.204m	✗	£0.204m
10	(Scotland) Lewis Macleod	1 January 2015	Brentford (England)	£0.85m	✗	£0.85m
11	(Scotland) Billy Gilmour	1 July 2017	Chelsea (England)	£0.5m	✓	£1.5m
12	(Scotland) Barrie McKay	5 July 2017	Nottingham Forest (England)	£0.5m	✗	£0.5m
13	(Scotland) Ryan Hardie	17 July 2019	Blackpool (England)	£0.15m	✗	£0.15m
14	(Democratic Republic of the Congo) Serge Atakayi	30 December 2019	SJK (Finland)	£0.1m	✗	£0.1m
15	(Scotland) Adedire Mebude	3 August 2020	Manchester City (England)	£0.1m	✓	£0.347m
16	(Scotland) Ross McCrorie	1 February 2021	Aberdeen (Scotland)	£0.35m	✓	£0.55m
17	(England) Nathan Young-Coombes	9 June 2022	Brentford (England)	£0.1m	✗	£0.1m
18	(Scotland) Nathan Patterson	4 January 2022	Everton (England)	£11.5m	✓	£16m
19	(Scotland) Rory Wilson	4 July 2022	Aston Villa (England)	£0.35m	✗	£0.35m
20	(Scotland) Glenn Middleton	29 July 2022	Dundee United (Scotland)	£0.15m	✗	£0.15m
21	(Northern Ireland) Charlie McCann	24 January 2023	Forest Green Rovers (England)	£0.35m	✗	£0.35m

=== List of Academy graduates ===
Below is a list of players who made a first-team appearance for Rangers, whilst a youth team player at the club. This includes both players that have come through the club's Academy set-up and also young professional players signed for the Academy who then go on to play in the first-team. The list includes all youth team graduates from the opening of the Rangers Training Centre in 2001 to the present day.

Players in bold are currently at the club.

First-team graduates
#	Name and nationality	Date of debut	Age at debut	Apps	Goals	Pro debut	Int caps
1	(Scotland) Allan McGregor	24 February 2002	20 years, 24 days	505	0	✓	✓
2	(Scotland) Chris Burke	20 March 2002	18 years, 108 days	131	14	✓	✓
3	(Scotland) Tom Brighton	12 May 2002	18 years, 45 days	1	0	✓	✗
4	(Scotland) Andy Dowie	12 May 2002	19 years, 48 days	1	0	✓	✗
5	(Scotland) Alan Hutton	22 December 2002	18 years, 22 days	122	4	✓	✓
6	(Scotland) Steven MacLean	22 December 2002	20 years, 121 days	4	0	✓	✗
7	(Scotland) Darryl Duffy	28 October 2003	19 years, 195 days	3	0	✓	✗
8	(Tunisia) Hamed Namouchi	10 January 2004	19 years, 330 days	51	6	✗	✓
9	(North Macedonia) Bajram Fetai	23 March 2004	18 years, 198 days	1	0	✗	✓
10	(Scotland) Alex Walker	4 April 2004	19 years, 345 days	2	0	✓	✗
11	(Scotland) Charlie Adam	14 April 2004	18 years, 126 days	88	18	✓	✓
12	(Scotland) Gary MacKenzie	1 May 2004	18 years, 199 days	2	0	✓	✗
13	(Scotland) Ross McCormack	1 May 2004	17 years, 257 days	14	4	✓	✓
14	(Scotland) Bob Davidson	16 May 2004	18 years, 52 days	1	0	✓	✗
15	(Scotland) Steven Smith	28 November 2004	18 years, 90 days	110	5	✓	✗
16	(Scotland) Alan Lowing	20 September 2005	17 years, 256 days	5	0	✓	✗
17	(Antigua and Barbuda) Moses Ashikodi	23 April 2006	18 years, 300 days	1	0	✗	✓
18	(England) Lee Robinson	7 May 2006	19 years, 309 days	10	0	✓	✗
19	(France) William Stanger	14 December 2006	21 years, 86 days	1	0	✗	✗
20	(Scotland) Steven Lennon	27 December 2006	18 years, 341 days	3	0	✓	✗
21	(Scotland) Andrew Shinnie	17 March 2007	17 years, 243 days	2	0	✓	✓
22	(Scotland) Paul Emslie	26 September 2007	19 years, 197 days	1	0	✓	✗
23	(Scotland) John Fleck	23 January 2008	16 years, 152 days	58	3	✓	✓
24	(South Africa) Dean Furman	10 May 2008	19 years, 262 days	1	0	✓	✓
25	(Scotland) Rory Loy	1 November 2008	20 years, 227 days	2	0	✓	✗
26	(Northern Ireland) Andrew Little	25 April 2009	19 years, 348 days	89	38	✓	✓
27	(Scotland) Gregg Wylde	29 August 2009	18 years, 159 days	48	2	✓	✗
28	(Scotland) Jordan McMillan	27 October 2009	21 years, 11 days	5	0	✗	✗
29	(Scotland) Danny Wilson	27 October 2009	17 years, 304 days	107	5	✓	✓
30	(Scotland) Kyle Hutton	14 August 2010	19 years, 180 days	72	2	✓	✗
31	(Scotland) Darren Cole	7 December 2010	18 years, 338 days	5	0	✓	✗
32	(Scotland) Jamie Ness	26 December 2010	19 years, 299 days	18	2	✓	✗
33	(England) Kane Hemmings	3 August 2011	20 years, 117 days	10	1	✓	✗
34	(Scotland) Ross Perry	13 August 2011	21 years, 187 days	33	0	✗	✗
35	(Norway) Thomas Kind Bendiksen	3 December 2011	22 years, 117 days	3	0	✓	✓
36	(Scotland) Rhys McCabe	3 March 2012	19 years, 233 days	9	0	✓	✗
37	(Northern Ireland) Andrew Mitchell	17 March 2012	19 years, 344 days	10	0	✓	✗
38	(Scotland) Barrie McKay	13 May 2012	17 years, 135 days	140	20	✓	✓
39	(Scotland) Lewis Macleod	29 July 2012	18 years, 43 days	74	16	✓	✗
40	(Scotland) Kal Naismith	29 July 2012	20 years, 162 days	24	3	✗	✗
41	(Scotland) Robbie Crawford	29 July 2012	19 years, 132 days	57	7	✓	✗
42	(Northern Ireland) Chris Hegarty	21 August 2012	20 years, 8 days	31	1	✓	✗
43	(Canada) Fraser Aird	23 September 2012	17 years, 234 days	85	12	✓	✓
44	(Scotland) Tom Walsh	8 December 2012	16 years, 150 days	13	0	✓	✗
45	(Canada) Luca Gasparotto	13 April 2013	17 years, 222 days	4	0	✓	✗
46	(Scotland) Danny Stoney	13 April 2013	16 years, 343 days	3	0	✓	✗
47	(Scotland) Andy Murdoch	27 April 2013	18 years, 87 days	23	1	✓	✗
48	(Scotland) Scott Gallacher	28 July 2013	24 years, 13 days	6	0	✗	✗
49	(Scotland) Kyle McAusland	28 July 2013	20 years, 190 days	7	0	✗	✗
50	(Scotland) Calum Gallagher	15 March 2014	19 years, 183 days	6	1	✗	✗
51	(Scotland) Charlie Telfer	19 April 2014	18 years, 289 days	1	0	✓	✗
52	(Scotland) Ryan Hardie	23 September 2014	17 years, 190 days	17	2	✓	✗
53	(Northern Ireland) Jordan Thompson	7 November 2015	18 years, 308 days	3	0	✓	✓
54	(Scotland) Liam Burt	1 March 2016	17 years, 29 days	3	0	✓	✗
55	(Malta) Myles Beerman	5 April 2017	18 years, 23 days	8	0	✓	✓
56	(Scotland) Jamie Barjonas	7 May 2017	18 years, 103 days	9	0	✓	✗
57	(Scotland) Aidan Wilson	17 May 2017	18 years, 135 days	2	0	✓	✗
58	(Scotland) Kyle Bradley	21 May 2017	18 years, 96 days	1	0	✓	✗
59	(Scotland) **Ross McCrorie**	19 September 2017	19 years, 185 days	61	2	✗	✓
60	(Scotland) Glenn Middleton	12 July 2018	18 years, 192 days	29	5	✓	✗
61	(Scotland) Stephen Kelly	26 September 2018	18 years, 166 days	3	0	✓	✗
62	(Democratic Republic of the Congo) Serge Atakayi	11 November 2018	19 years, 285 days	1	0	✗	✗
63	(Scotland) Jordan Houston	30 January 2019	19 years, 10 days	1	0	✓	✗
64	(Scotland) Dapo Mebude	19 May 2019	17 years, 294 days	1	0	✓	✗
65	(Scotland) Josh McPake	18 July 2019	17 years, 321 days	1	0	✓	✓
66	(Scotland) Nathan Patterson	17 January 2020	18 years, 93 days	27	2	✓	✓
67	(Scotland) Kai Kennedy	17 January 2020	17 years, 295 days	1	0	✓	✗
68	(Scotland) Ciaran Dickson	29 November 2020	18 years, 192 days	1	0	✓	✗
69	(Scotland) Leon King	29 November 2020	16 years, 320 days	42	0	✓	✗
70	(Scotland) Robby McCrorie	26 August 2021	23 years, 161 days	7	0	✗	✗
71	(Scotland) Alex Lowry	21 January 2022	18 years, 212 days	14	2	✓	✗
72	(Northern Ireland) Charlie McCann	12 February 2022	19 years, 294 days	8	0	✓	✗
73	(Scotland) Adam Devine	8 May 2022	19 years, 44 days	11	0	✗	✗
74	(Scotland) Cole McKinnon	14 May 2022	19 years, 105 days	4	1	✗	✗
75	(Northern Ireland) **Ross McCausland**	14 May 2022	19 years, 2 days	67	8	✓	✓
76	(England) Tony Weston	14 May 2022	18 years, 239 days	1	0	✗	✗
77	(Scotland) Robbie Ure	30 August 2022	18 years, 185 days	3	1	✓	✓
78	(England) Zak Lovelace	30 August 2022	16 years, 219 days	7	0	✗	✗
79	(England) **Paul Nsio**	30 August 2022	16 years, 168 days	3	0	✓	✗
80	(England) Archie Stevens	30 August 2022	16 years, 231 days	1	0	✓	✗
81	(Scotland) **Bailey Rice**	18 February 2023	16 years, 137 days	16	0	✓	✗
82	(Scotland) Arron Lyall	21 May 2023	19 years, 236 days	1	0	✗	✗
83	(England) Johnly Yfeko	19 August 2023	20 years, 149 days	1	0	✓	✗
84	(Scotland) Robbie Fraser	14 May 2024	21 years, 42 days	6	0	✓	✗
85	(Scotland) **Liam Kelly**	21 December 2024	28 years, 333 days	16	0	✗	✓
86	(Northern Ireland) **Mason Munn**	19 January 2025	18 years, 295 days	1	0	✓	✗
87	(Scotland) **Findlay Curtis**	19 January 2025	18 years, 224 days	40	3	✓	✓
88	(England) **Zebedee Lawson**	16 January 2026	17 years, 59 days	2	0	✓	✗
89	(Scotland) **Aiden McCallion**	16 May 2026	17 years, 335 days	1	0	✓	✗
90	(Scotland) **Ashton Scally**	16 May 2026	16 years, 28 days	1	0	✓	✗
