= Youssef Chermiti =

Portuguese footballer (born 2004)

Personal information
- Full name: Youssef Ramalho Chermiti
- Date of birth: 24 May 2004 (age 22)
- Place of birth: Vila do Porto, Azores, Portugal
- Height: 1.92 m (6 ft 4 in)
- Position: Striker

Team information
- Current team: Rangers
- Number: 9

Youth career
- 2013–2014: Os Marienses
- 2014–2015: ACF Pauleta
- 2015–2016: GD São Pedro
- 2016–2021: Sporting CP

Senior career*
Years	Team	Apps	(Gls)
2021–2023	Sporting CP B	10	(3)
2023	Sporting CP	16	(3)
2023–2025	Everton	22	(0)
2025–	Rangers	32	(15)

International career^{‡}
2019	Portugal U15	5	(1)
2019–2020	Portugal U16	12	(1)
2021–2022	Portugal U18	12	(6)
2022–2023	Portugal U19	4	(3)
2023	Portugal U20	4	(2)
2024–2026	Portugal U21	8	(3)
- * Club domestic league appearances and goals as of 17:38, 9 August 2026 (UTC) ‡ National team caps and goals as of 12:50, 11 August 2026 (UTC)

Youssef Ramalho Chermiti (born 24 May 2004) is a Portuguese professional footballer who plays as a forward for Scottish Premiership club Rangers.

== Club career ==
=== Youth career ===
Chermiti is a youth product of Os Marienses, ACF Pauleta, and GD São Pedro, before moving to the youth academy of Sporting CP in 2016.

=== Sporting CP ===
On 22 July 2020, Chermiti signed his first professional contract with Sporting for three seasons. He was promoted to their B-team in 2021, but was sidelined with injuries for eight months before training with the senior team in November 2022.

Chermiti made his debut for Sporting's main team on 15 January 2023, coming off the bench to replace Paulinho in the 78th minute of a 2–2 Primeira Liga draw away at local rivals Benfica. On 1 February, he made his first start for the side, playing the full match in a 5–0 home victory over Braga. Five days later, Chermiti scored his first goal for Sporting and first Primeira Liga goal, in a 1–0 away victory over Rio Ave. Six days later, he once again started in the league, at home to rivals Porto, scoring a late consolation goal in a 2–1 loss. After the match, Porto's manager Sérgio Conceição congratulated Chermiti on his performance, describing him as a "youngster with a lot of quality" during the post-match press conference. Four days later, he made his debut in European competitions, coming on as a substitute for the final minutes of a 1–1 draw at home to Midtjylland in the knockout round play-offs of the UEFA Europa League. In the 2022–23 season, Chermiti made 22 appearances in all competitions for Sporting CP, scoring three goals and providing two assists.

=== Everton ===
On 11 August 2023, Chermiti signed a four-year contract with Premier League club Everton, for a fee of £11.5 million, which could rise to £14 million with add-ons. Sporting CP are also owed 12.5% of any profit Everton receive from a future transfer of the player.

Chermiti made his debut for Everton on 26 August, coming off the bench in the 66th minute to replace Lewis Dobbin in a 1–0 league loss to Wolverhampton Wanderers at Goodison Park. Four days later, he made his first start for the club in an EFL Cup match away at Doncaster Rovers; at half-time, with the Toffees losing 1–0 to the League Two side, Chermiti was replaced by compatriot Beto, who went on to score the equaliser; Everton ended up achieving a 2–1 comeback win. On 7 November 2023, Chermiti started for Everton U21s in an EFL Trophy group stage match against Mansfield Town, scoring the only goal of the game through an extra-time penalty.

=== Rangers ===
On 1 September 2025, Chermiti moved to Scottish Premiership club Rangers in a deal worth £8 million, which could rise to £10 million with add-ons becoming Rangers most expensive signing since Tore Andrè Flo in 2000. He made his debut for Rangers in a league match on 13 September 2025 in a 2–0 defeat to Hearts at Ibrox. He scored his first goal for the club on 20 October 2025 during a 3–1 victory over Kilmarnock at Rugby Park which was new manager Danny Röhl’s first game in charge. On 3 January 2026 Rangers found themselves 1–0 down to Old Firm rivals Celtic at Celtic Park, Chermiti scored a brace as Rangers came back to win the match 3–1 and go level on points in the Scottish Premiership with their rivals after being 13 points behind them earlier in the season. On 15 February 2026, he scored his first professional hat-trick as Rangers defeated Hearts 4–2 at Ibrox to move within two points of the league leaders. On 1 March 2026, Chermitti scored a brace including an overhead kick in an Old Firm match at Ibrox to bring his tally to four goals in two games against Celtic.

On 16 May 2026, he scored his second hat-trick of the season on the final match day as Rangers defeated Falkirk 5–2 at Falkirk Stadium. In doing so he became the first player to score two league hat-tricks in the same Scottish Premiership season since Lawrence Shankland in 2022–23 and the first Rangers player to do so since Jermaine Defoe in the 2019–20 season.

On 9 August 2026, it was widely reported that Rangers had turned down a £22 million bid from Galatasaray for Chermitti just hours later he suffered a serious ACL knee ligament injury during a match against Hibernian which required him to undergo surgery.

== International career ==
He is a youth international for Portugal, having played up to the Portugal U21s.

On 21 November 2023, after representing Portugal U20 in a 2–1 loss in a friendly against Italy U20, Chermiti announced on social media that an opponent had racially abused him during the match.

== Personal life ==
Chermiti was born in Azores, Santa Maria in Portugal to a Tunisian-French father and Bissau-Guinean mother. Chermiti holds Portuguese, Tunisian, French and Bissau-Guinean citizenship. Chermiti is the cousin of the Tunisian footballer Amine Chermiti.

== Career statistics ==
As of match played 9 August 2026

Appearances and goals by club, season and competition
Club	Season	League			National cup (Note: Includes FA Cup, Scottish Cup)		League cup (Note: Includes Taça da Liga, EFL Cup, Scottish League Cup)		Europe		Other		Total	
Club	Season	Division	Apps	Goals	Apps	Goals	Apps	Goals	Apps	Goals	Apps	Goals	Apps	Goals
Sporting CP B	2021–22	Liga 3	10	3	—		—		—		—		10	3
Sporting CP	2022–23	Primeira Liga	16	3	0	0	1	0	5 (Note: Appearance(s) in UEFA Europa League)	0	—		22	3
Everton	2023–24	Premier League	18	0	1	0	1	0	—		—		20	0
Everton	2024–25	Premier League	4	0	0	0	0	0	—		—		4	0
Everton	2025–26	Premier League	0	0	—		1	0	—		—		1	0
Everton	Total		22	0	1	0	2	0	0	0	0	0	25	0
Everton U21	2023–24	—			—		—		—		1 (Note: Appearance in EFL Trophy)	1	1	1
Rangers	2025–26	Scottish Premiership	30	15	1	0	2	0	8	0	—		41	15
Rangers	2026–27	Scottish Premiership	2	0	0	0	0	0	1	0	—		3	0
Rangers	Total		32	15	1	0	2	0	9	0	—		44	15
Career total			80	21	2	0	5	0	14	0	1	1	102	22

== Honours ==
Individual

- Scottish Premiership Player of the Month: March 2026
