= Findlay Curtis =

Scottish footballer

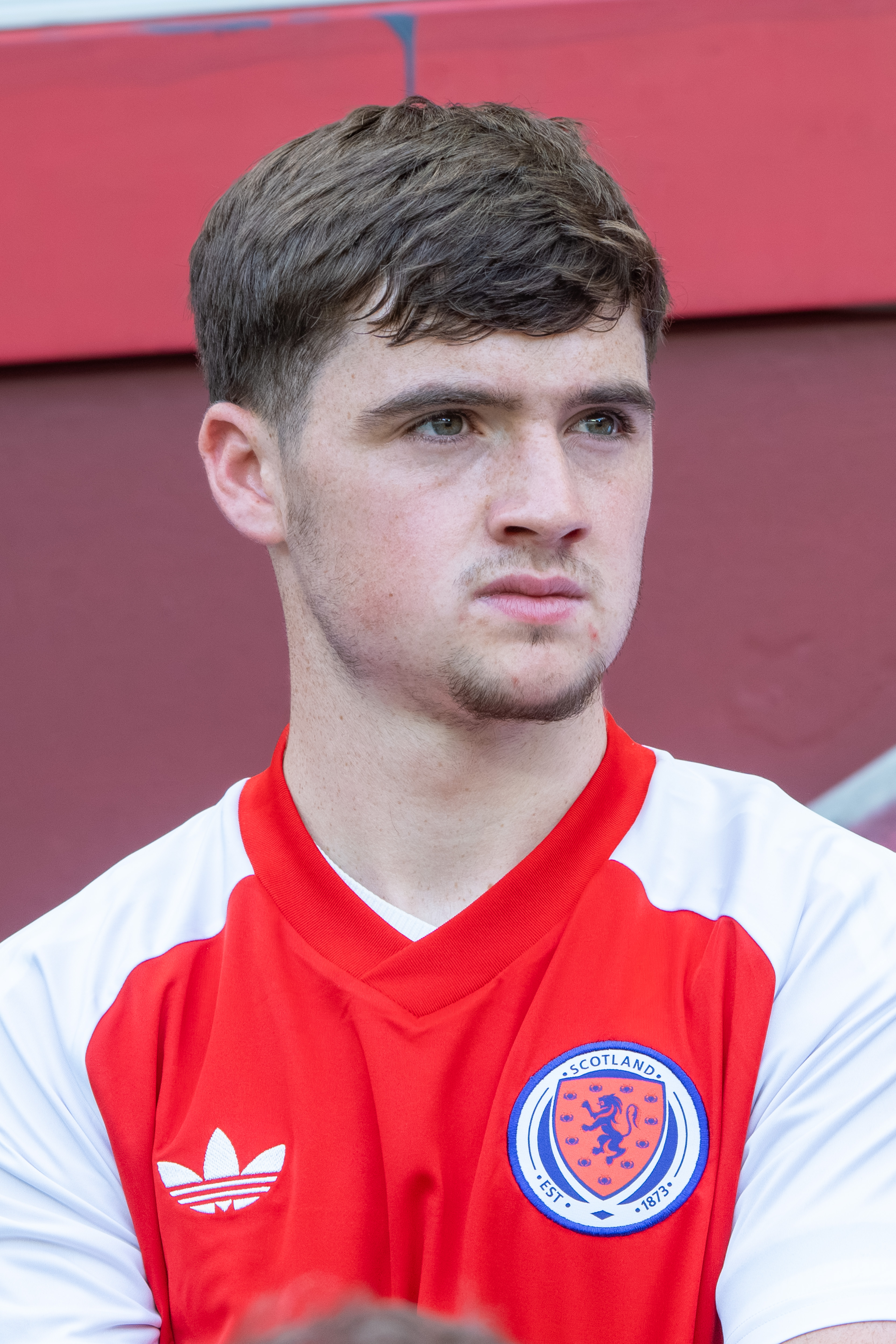
- Curtis with Scotland in 2026

Personal information
- Full name: Findlay Kenneth Curtis
- Date of birth: 9 June 2006 (age 20)
- Place of birth: Balfron, Stirlingshire, Scotland
- Height: 5 ft 11 in (1.80 m)
- Position: Midfielder

Team information
- Current team: Rangers
- Number: 52

Youth career
- 2012–2025: Rangers

Senior career*
Years	Team	Apps	(Gls)
2025–	Rangers	22	(1)
2026	→ Kilmarnock (loan)	14	(5)

International career^{‡}
2025–	Scotland U21	2	(0)
2026–	Scotland	6	(1)
- * Club domestic league appearances and goals as of 02:06, 25 October 2026 (UTC) ‡ National team caps and goals as of 18:40, 7 October 2026 (UTC)

Findlay Kenneth Curtis (born 9 June 2006) is a Scottish professional footballer who plays as a midfielder for Rangers and the Scotland national team.

He joined Rangers at age 6 and made his professional debut in January 2025. Twelve months later he moved on loan to Kilmarnock, and helped the team avoid relegation. He made his senior international debut for Scotland in March 2026 and was chosen for the 2026 FIFA World Cup, where he became the country's youngest player in tournament history.

== Club career ==
Curtis joined Rangers' academy at age 6, having impressed at a football school run by the club. In July 2022, he signed his first professional contract and was promoted to Rangers' under-18 team. His deal was extended in January 2023 to last until June 2024. On 1 May 2024 he scored a penalty kick to equalise as Rangers came from behind to win the Scottish Youth Cup against Aberdeen at Hampden Park. On 28 May 2024, Curtis signed a further extension until 2025.

Curtis was part of the Rangers B Team in the Scottish Challenge Cup. He scored twice in a 4–1 home win over Stenhousemuir on 22 October 2024, in the fourth round of the cup.

On 19 January 2025, Curtis made his first-team debut in the fourth round of the Scottish Cup, in a 5–0 win over Highland Football League club Fraserburgh. He came on as a substitute in the 62nd minute and assisted the last goal, completing Cyriel Dessers' hat-trick. Four days later he made his European debut in the UEFA Europa League league phase, again from the bench for the final half-hour of a 2–1 loss away to Manchester United; according to Ewan Paton of The National, he gave a good performance in "difficult circumstances".

On 29 January 2025, Curtis signed a contract extension of undisclosed length. Eighteen days later, he made his Scottish Premiership debut in the last minute of a 3–1 win away to Heart of Midlothian.

On 22 July 2025, Curtis scored his first goal for Rangers in a UEFA Champions League qualifier against Panathinaikos at Ibrox. He started the game on the left side of the attack, in Russell Martin's first game as manager. His first league goal came on 24 August as the equaliser in a 1–1 draw away to St Mirren, as a substitute for Joe Rothwell.

On 30 January 2026, having achieved three goals and two assists in 21 Rangers appearances, Curtis joined fellow Scottish Premiership club Kilmarnock on loan for the remainder of the season. He scored five goals in 14 games, including four in the last five fixtures, as "Killie" avoided relegation in 10th place.

== International career ==
Curtis made his first appearance for the Scotland under-21 team on 5 September 2025, as a 77th-minute substitute for Daniel Kelly in a 2–0 loss away to the Czech Republic in 2027 UEFA European Under-21 Championship qualification.

Curtis was included in the full Scotland squad for the first time in March 2026, for friendly matches against Japan and the Ivory Coast. He made his debut on 28 March against Japan at Hampden Park, replacing Tommy Conway for the last nine minutes. He was called up for the 2026 FIFA World Cup in North America; manager Steve Clarke praised his decision to move on loan to Kilmarnock for regular playing time. He scored his first Scotland goal on 30 May, equalising in a 4–1 friendly win against Curaçao and winning a penalty that Ryan Christie scored. In Scotland's opening game of the tournament, a 1–0 win over Haiti, he played the last seven minutes and took the record of teammate Ben Gannon-Doak as the team's youngest ever World Cup player.

== Career statistics ==
=== Club ===
As of match played 25 October 2026

Appearances and goals by club, season and competition
Club	Season	League			Scottish Cup		League Cup		Europe		Total	
Club	Season	Division	Apps	Goals	Apps	Goals	Apps	Goals	Apps	Goals	Apps	Goals
Rangers	2024–25	Scottish Premiership	3	0	1	0	0	0	1 (Note: Appearance in UEFA Europa League)	0	5	0
Rangers	2025–26	Scottish Premiership	10	1	1	0	2	1	8 (Note: Four appearances and one goal in UEFA Champions League, four appearances in UEFA Europa League)	1	21	3
Rangers	2026–27	Scottish Premiership	9	0	0	0	2	0	4 (Note: Two appearances in UEFA Europa League, two appearances in UEFA Conference League)	0	15	0
Rangers	Total		22	1	2	0	4	1	9	1	37	3
Kilmarnock (loan)	2025–26	Scottish Premiership	14	5	—		—		—		14	5
Career total			36	6	2	0	4	1	13	1	55	8

=== International ===
As of match played 6 October 2026

Appearances and goals by national team and year
National team	Year	Apps	Goals
Scotland	2026	6	1
Total		6	1

Scores and results list Scotland's goal tally first.

List of international goals scored by Findlay Curtis
No.	Date	Venue	Opponent	Score	Result	Competition
1	30 May 2026	Hampden Park, Glasgow, Scotland	Curaçao	1–1	4–1	Friendly
