= Sascha Lense =

German footballer (born 1975)

Personal information
- Date of birth: 5 October 1975 (age 51)
- Place of birth: Lich
- Height: 1.84 m (6 ft 0 in)
- Position: Midfielder

Team information
- Current team: Red Bull Salzburg (assistant)

Youth career
- –1990: FC Burgsolms
- 1990–1992: Eintracht Frankfurt
- 1992–1993: Darmstadt 98
- 1993–1994: FSV Frankfurt

Senior career*
| Years | Team | Apps | (Gls) |
| 1994–1995 | FSV Frankfurt | 26 | (1) |
| 1995–1996 | VfB Gießen | | |
| 1996–1998 | FSV Zwickau | 62 | (3) |
| 1998–1999 | SpVgg Unterhaching | 6 | (0) |
| 1999–2000 | Dynamo Dresden | 19 | (1) |
| 2000–2002 | Darmstadt 98 | 37 | (1) |
| 2002–2005 | FV Dresden 06 | | |
| 2005–2006 | Gelb-Weiß Görlitz | | |

International career
- Germany U17
- * Club domestic league appearances and goals

Sascha Lense (born 5 October 1975) is a German football coach and former player. He currently serves as the assistant coach of Austrian Bundesliga club Red Bull Salzburg. He made nearly 100 appearances in the 2. Bundesliga in the 1990s.

On 7 December 2021, Lense was hired by Manchester United as a sports psychologist to work under interim manager Ralf Rangnick.

On 16 October 2023, Lense was appointed the performance manager at Sheffield Wednesday by manager Danny Röhl. He left Sheffield Wednesday in July 2025, after Danny Röhl left the club.

== Personal life ==
Lense is the father-in-law to footballer Timo Werner.
