= Óscar Cortés (footballer, born 2003) =

Colombian footballer (born 2003)

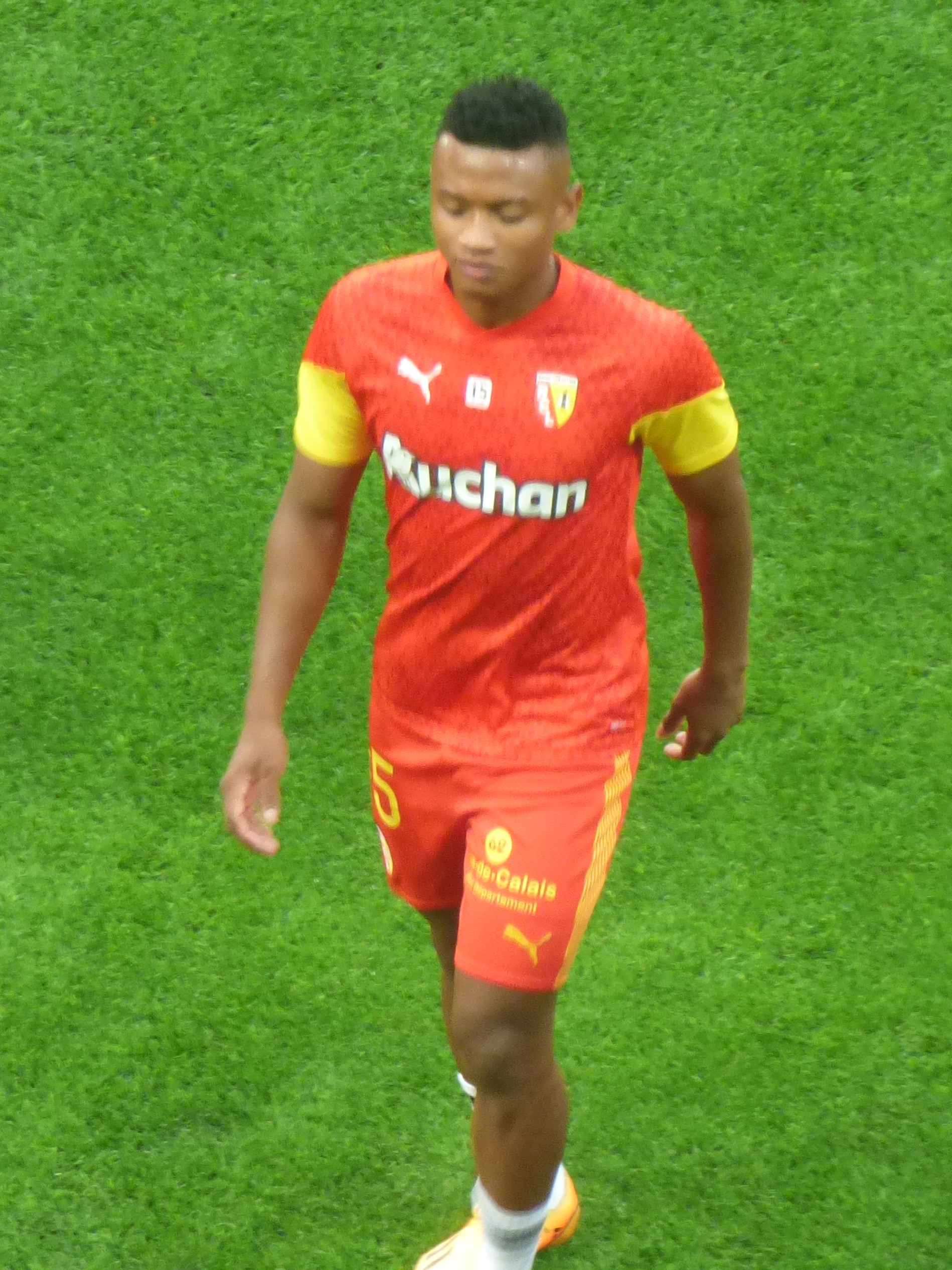
- Cortés playing for Lens in 2023

Personal information
- Full name: Óscar Manuel Cortés Cortés
- Date of birth: 3 December 2003 (age 22)
- Place of birth: Tumaco, Colombia
- Height: 1.77 m (5 ft 10 in)
- Position: Winger

Team information
- Current team: Huracán (on loan from Rangers)

Youth career
- Millonarios

Senior career*
Years	Team	Apps	(Gls)
2022–2023	Millonarios	20	(5)
2023–2025	Lens	4	(1)
2023–2025	Lens II	6	(3)
2024–2025	→ Rangers (loan)	16	(1)
2025–	Rangers	1	(0)
2025–2026	→ Sporting Gijón (loan)	5	(0)
2026–	→ Huracán (loan)	24	(3)

International career
2022–2023	Colombia U20	13	(4)
2023	Colombia	1	(0)
- * Club domestic league appearances and goals as of 17:10, 6 July 2026 (UTC)

Óscar Manuel Cortés Cortés (born 3 December 2003) is a Colombian professional footballer who plays as a winger for Primera División club Huracán, on loan from Scottish Premiership side Rangers.

== Club career ==
=== Millonarios ===
Born in Tumaco, Cortés progressed through the academy of Millonarios, making his debut in the 2022 season. He signed his first professional contract in May of the same year.

On 12 January 2022, Cortés made his debut for Millonarios' first team in the opening match of the Apertura against Deportivo Pasto. He came on as a substitute in the 89th minute for Macalister Silva in a match that ended with Millonarios winning 1–0. In February, Cortés formed part of Millonario's under-20 squad, which competed at the 2022 U-20 Copa Libertadores. On 12 May, he scored his first professional goal in a second-leg Copa Colombia match against Jaguares de Córdoba, contributing to Millonarios' 1–1 tie in the game and aiding the team in advancing to the quarter-finals 4–1 on aggregate.

After an impressive performance for Colombia at the 2023 South American U-20 Championship, Cortés drew the attention of Serie A club Torino, who have been linked with a potential move for the player. Upon his return to Millonarios, Cortés scored his first brace for the club on 18 February during a league match against Jaguares. His performances contributed to Millonarios' 2–1 home victory, securing three important points for the team. On 2 March, a remarkable display by Cortés played a pivotal role in Millonarios' victory over Ecuadorian side Universidad Católica in the second round of the 2023 Copa Libertadores. Cortés' contribution included assisting Millonario's equalizing goal and creating the game-winning play that ultimately secured a 2–1 aggregate victory for Millonarios, advancing them to the third round of the tournament to face Brazilian powerhouse Atlético Mineiro.

=== Lens ===
On 14 July 2023, Cortés transferred to French Ligue 1 club RC Lens. The fee reported for the transfer was $5 million (€4.4M). He scored his first goal with Lens on 16 December 2023 in a 2–0 home victory against Reims.

=== Rangers ===
On 1 February 2024, Cortés moved on loan to the Scottish club Rangers. On 24 February 2024, Cortés scored his first Rangers goal in a 5–0 win over Hearts at Ibrox. On 3 June 2024, Rangers announced that Cortés had signed another loan deal for the 2024–25 season, with an obligation to buy in the summer of 2025.

On 1 July 2025, Cortés' permanent move to Rangers for a fee of £4.5 million was confirmed. On 1 September however, he was loaned out to Sporting Gijón on a season-long deal.

After four months on loan at Sporting Gijón, Cortes was recalled by Rangers and loaned to Primera División club Huracán for the rest of the Primera Division season.

== International career ==
=== Youth ===
Cortés has represented Colombia at under-20 level. He starred at the 2023 South American U-20 Championship as Colombia finished third, helping his team qualify to the 2023 FIFA U-20 World Cup in Indonesia and the 2023 Pan American Games in Santiago. With three goals to his name, he emerged as Colombia's leading scorer in the tournament, thanks to his brace against Peru in the group stage and a goal he scored during Colombia's impressive 3–0 victory over Paraguay in the final stage.

== Career statistics ==
=== Club ===
As of match played 17 May 2025

Appearances and goals by club, season and competition
Club	Season	League			National cup (Note: Includes Copa Colombia, Scottish Cup)		League cup (Note: Includes Scottish League Cup)		Continental		Total	
Club	Season	Division	Apps	Goals	Apps	Goals	Apps	Goals	Apps	Goals	Apps	Goals
Millonarios Fútbol Club	2022	Categoría Primera A	9	0	1	1	—		0	0	10	1
Millonarios Fútbol Club	2023	Categoría Primera A	11	5	0	0	—		8 (Note: Four appearances in Copa Libertadores, four appearances in Copa Sudamericana)	1	19	6
Millonarios Fútbol Club	Total		20	5	1	1	—		8	1	29	7
Lens II	2023–24	National 3	6	0	—		—		—		6	0
Lens	2023–24	Ligue 1	4	1	0	0	—		0	0	4	1
Rangers (loan)	2023–24	Scottish Premiership	6	1	1	0	0	0	0	0	7	1
Rangers (loan)	2024–25	Scottish Premiership	10	0	0	0	1	0	0	0	11	0
Rangers	2025–26	Scottish Premiership	0	0	0	0	0	0	0	0	0	0
Career total			46	7	2	1	1	0	8	1	57	9

=== International ===
Appearances and goals by national team and year
National team	Year	Apps	Goals
Colombia	2023	1	0
Total		1	0

== Honours ==
Millonarios

- Copa Colombia: 2022
- Categoría Primera A: 2023-I

Individual

- FIFA U-20 World Cup Bronze Boot: 2023
