= Rangers Fans Fighting Fund =

- Founded: 14 March 2012
- Founders: Sandy Jardine (launched); Walter Smith (launched)
- Type: Not-for-profit
- Purpose: Preserving Rangers FC's future
- Location: Glasgow, UK
- Region served: Rangers Football Club
- Key people: Andrew McCormick (Chairman)
- Revenue: GBP 483,144.45

Rangers Fans Fighting Fund was a fan raised fund which was created to aid the daily running costs of Rangers Football Club.

== History ==
The Fund was launched on 14 March 2012 by Rangers legends Walter Smith and Sandy Jardine during the club's administration in order to raise funds to help protect the Club's future. The Fund was endorsed by three of the largest Rangers fans groups, namely the Rangers Supporters' Trust, the Rangers Supporters Assembly and the Rangers Supporters Association. In September 2014, the Fund decided to withhold any payments to the club after requesting and failing to receive adequate assurances from the then Rangers board regarding its future plans When the Rangers board agreed to grant Mike Ashley's Sport Direct company security over Rangers Training Centre and Ibrox Stadium in January 2015, the Fund pledged £500,000 of its funding to support the Rangers Supporters' Trust's legal battle seeking to prevent the board from doing so.

In February 2016, the Fund revealed plans to provide £450,000 to build a 264-seater stand at the Rangers Training Centre. Work began in January 2018 and was completed around 18 months later; the stand was officially opened on 2 August 2019.

== Governance ==
The Fund is overseen by a committee of ten individuals, led by a Chairman.

Rangers Fans Fighting Fund committee members
Name	Position
Andrew McCormick	Chairman
Robert Roddie	Committee member
William Montgomery	Committee member
Mark Dingwall	Committee member
John MacMillan	Committee member
Richard Spence	Committee member
David McCutcheon	Committee member
John McKee	Committee member
Tam Green	Committee member
Jim Riddell	Committee member
