= Tuur Rommens =

Belgian footballer

Personal information
- Date of birth: 26 March 2003 (age 23)
- Place of birth: Oud-Turnhout, Belgium
- Height: 1.85 m (6 ft 1 in)
- Position: Left-back

Team information
- Current team: Rangers
- Number: 25

Youth career
- FC Zwaneven
- Westerlo
- Genk

Senior career*
Years	Team	Apps	(Gls)
2021–2022	Genk	1	(0)
2022–2023	Jong Genk	31	(1)
2023–2026	Westerlo	77	(1)
2026–	Rangers	11	(1)

International career^{‡}
2020	Belgium U17	1	(0)
2021–2022	Belgium U19	10	(1)
2022	Belgium U20	1	(0)
2023–2025	Belgium U21	9	(0)
- * Club domestic league appearances and goals as of 21 March 2026 ‡ National team caps and goals as of 18:30, 30 November 2024 (UTC)

Tuur Rommens (born 26 March 2003) is a Belgian professional footballer who plays as a left-back for Scottish Premiership club Rangers.

== Early life ==
Born and raised in Oud-Turnhout, in the Flemish province of Antwerp, Rommens joined Genk's academy from Westerlo when he was nine.

== Club career ==
Rommens was a regular with Genk under-19s, since the 2019–20 Youth League, eventually captaining his side during the 2021–22 edition, as well as the reserve team for that season.

Having signed his first professional contract with Genk in February 2020, he signed an extension at the end of April 2021, until mid-2024.

Rommens made his first team debut on 27 October 2021 coming on as a halftime substitute for Gerardo Arteaga, during the 6–0 away cup win against Sint-Eloois-Winkel. He made his league debut for Genk on 16 December 2021, replacing Simen Juklerød at the end of a 4–2 home win against Sporting Charleroi.

On 4 July 2023, Rommens signed a four-year contract with Westerlo.

After 2 and a half years at Westerlo, Rommens left the club to join Scottish Premiership club Rangers.

== International career ==
Already a Belgium under-17 international, Rommens played with the under-19 in 2021, scoring his first goal with the team on 10 November 2021, during a Euro qualifier game against Azerbaijan, having become a regular starter for the team at left-back, before eventually captaining the Belgian side during the qualifying game against Javi Serrano's Spain.

== Career statistics ==
=== Club ===
As of match played 9 August 2026

Appearances and goals by club, season and competition
Club	Season	League			National cup (Note: Includes Belgian Cup, Scottish Cup)		Continental		Other		Total	
Club	Season	Division	Apps	Goals	Apps	Goals	Apps	Goals	Apps	Goals	Apps	Goals
Genk	2021–22	Belgian Pro League	1	0	1	0	—		—		2	0
Jong Genk	2022–23	Challenger Pro League	21	0	—		—		10 (Note: Appearances in Challenger Pro League Relegation play-offs)	1	31	1
Westerlo	2023–24	Belgian Pro League	16	1	0	0	—		8 (Note: Appearances in Belgian Pro League European play-offs)	0	24	1
Westerlo	2024–25	Belgian Pro League	28	0	2	0	—		10	0	40	0
Westerlo	2025–26	Belgian Pro League	15	0	—		—		—		15	0
Westerlo	Total		59	1	2	0	—		18	0	79	1
Rangers	2025–26	Scottish Premiership	10	1	2	0	—		—		12	1
Rangers	2026–27	Scottish Premiership	2	0	0	0	1 (Note: Appearance in UEFA Europa League)	0	—		3	0
Rangers	Total		12	1	2	0	1	0	—		15	1
Career total			93	2	5	0	1	0	28	1	127	3
