= Kyle Glasgow =

Scottish footballer (born 2010)

Personal information
- Full name: Kyle Fernandes Glasgow
- Date of birth: 20 February 2010 (age 16)
- Place of birth: Kirkcaldy, Scotland
- Positions: Forward; attacking midfielder

Team information
- Current team: Alloa Athletic (on loan from Rangers)
- Number: 7 (Alloa Athletic)

Youth career
- 2014–2026: Rangers

Senior career*
Years	Team	Apps	(Gls)
2026–	Rangers	0	(0)
2026–	Alloa Athletic (loan)	14	(4)

International career^{‡}
2024–2025	Scotland U15	5	(2)
2025–2026	Portugal U16	4	(0)
2026–	Scotland U17	4	(0)
2026–	Scotland U19	3	(0)
2026–	Scotland U21	1	(0)
- * Club domestic league appearances and goals as of 22 November 2026 ‡ National team caps and goals as of 22 November 2026

Kyle Fernandes Glasgow (born 20 February 2010) is a Scottish professional footballer who plays as a forward or attacking midfielder for Scottish League One club Alloa Athletic, on loan from Scottish Premiership side Rangers.

== Early life ==
Glasgow was born on 20 February 2010 in Kirkcaldy, Scotland. The younger brother of Scottish footballer Euan Glasgow, he was born to a Portuguese mother and a Scottish father and comes from Lochgelly, Fife. He attended school in Edinburgh. Growing up he was a supporter of Scottish side Rangers. Glasgow's great great grandfather Harry Muir was also a player for Rangers who made his debut in 1913.

== Club career ==
Rangers

As a youth player, Glasgow joined the youth academy of Scottish Premiership side Rangers. He won CAS Elite League titles at both U-17 and U-19 level on the same day when Malky Thomson’s U-19s side dug deep to beat St Mirren 2–1 in Paisley, thanks to two stunning strikes from Zeb Lawson – a result that clinched the championship on the final day of the season. Hours later, he came off the bench to score the third goal as the U-17s beat Hibs 3–0 at Ibrox to complete a memorable day for the highly-rated teenager.

On 6 September 2025, he made his debut for the Rangers B team at just 15 years of age playing 90 minutes against professional side Queen Of The South in a 2–1 loss during a Scottish Challenge Cup group stage match and would feature a further two times in the competition that season. On 27 February 2026, Glasgow signed a two-and-a-half-year professional contract with Rangers keeping him at the club until the summer of 2028. On 13 August 2026, Glasgow was called up to the senior squad for the first time and was an unused substitute in Rangers Europa League third qualifying round match 2ng leg match against Jagiellonia.

Alloa Athletic

On 14 July 2026, Glasgow signed for Scottish League One side Alloa Athletic on a season long loan as part of a co-operation deal with Rangers which would see him still make appearances for the Rangers B and youth teams throughout the season. He made his professional debut at just 16 years of age the same day as his signing was announced playing 45 minutes in a Scottish League Cup group game against Edinburgh City with the match ending in a 2–0 loss. On 21 July 2026, he scored his first professional goal against Scottish Premiership side Falkirk in a 1–1 draw in another League Cup group game match. Glasgow would feature in all four of Alloa’s group matches during the league cup playing as a right winger. On 1 August 2026, Glasgow made his professional league debut playing the full 90 minutes in a 0–0 draw with East Fife. On 15 August 2026, he scored his first league goal for Alloa in a 3–0 victory over Montrose. This was followed up a week later with both a goal and an assist in a 2–0 victory over Queen Of The South. Glasgow would add goals against East Kilbride and East Fife over the months of September and October playing on both the left and right wing to take his tally to four goals in ten league matches earning him a call up to the Scotland national under-21 squad. During this time he featured five times for Rangers B in the Challenge Cup league phase. On 28 October 2026, Glasgow played the full 90 minutes in Rangers U-19 UEFA Youth League second round 1st leg match against Dynamo Kyiv U-19 scoring a goal after he robbed the goalkeeper inside his own six-yard area before slotting the ball into an empty net in a 3–2 loss. On 4 November 2026, Glasgow scored another goal as Rangers U-19 defeated Dynamo Kyiv 3–0 (5–3 on aggregate) in the 2nd leg of their tie at Forthbank Stadium to advance to the third round of the competition.

== International career ==
Glasgow is eligible to play for both Scotland and Portugal due to being born to a Portuguese mother and a Scottish father.

On 29 September 2024, he was called up to the Scotland national under-15 football team for a friendly against Greece U-15 playing the full 120 minutes as Greece defeated Scotland 4–3 on penalties. On 4 October 2024, he scored his first international goal in a 4–2 victory over Serbia U-15. Glasgow would feature in five games in total for the side scoring a further goal and getting an assist in two different games against Spain U-15.

On 16 December 2025, Glasgow was called up to the Portugal national under-16 football team for two friendlies against Italy U-16 which would take place over the course of two days. He played in both matches coming as a substitute in the first which Portugal won 3–0 and starting the second in a 2–0 loss. On 11 January 2026, he would play in another double header against Germany U-16.

On 18 February 2026, Glasgow was called up to the Scotland national under-17 football team for friendlies against Norway U-17 and Poland U-17 playing 75 minutes in a 2–0 loss to Norway. He was again called up for Scotland’s 2026 UEFA European Under-17 Championship qualification matches playing in all three group games and getting an assist against Northern Ireland U-17 although Scotland would exit the competition.

On 16 September 2026, it was announced that Glasgow had been called up to the Scotland national under-21 football team for their 2027 UEFA European Under-21 Championship qualification matches against Azerbaijan U-21 and Bulgaria U-21 despite only being 16 years of age with praise from manager Tony Docherty for his performances whilst on loan at Alloa who stated in an interview "Selection for squads is all based on performance and there's an example of a young player that's performing really well at that level and I think he needs rewarded for that." On 30 September 2026, he made his debut in a 5–2 victory over Azerbaijan coming on as a 84th minute substitute for Dylan Lobban.

On 4 November 2026, Glasgow was called up to the Scotland national under-19 football team for the first time for their 2027 UEFA European Under-19 Championship qualification round 2 group matches against Kazakstan U-19, Kosovo U-19 and Belgium U-19 meaning he had debuted for three different age groups in the same year. On 11 November 2026, he made his debut in a 3–1 victory over Kazakstan U-19 playing 86 minutes a game in which he played alongside his brother Euan Glasgow. He would go on to start all three group matches and help Scotland advanced to round 3 of the qualifiers after finishing runner-up in their group.

== Career statistics ==
As of match played 22 November 2026

Appearances and goals by club, season and competition
Club	Season	League			Cup		League Cup		Other		Total	
Club	Season	Division	Apps	Goals	Apps	Goals	Apps	Goals	Apps	Goals	Apps	Goals
Rangers B	2025–26	–	—		—		—		3 (Note: Appearances in Scottish Challenge Cup)	0	3	0
Rangers B	2026–27	–	—		—		—		5	0	5	0
Total			0	0	0	0	0	0	8	0	8	0
Alloa Athletic (loan)	2026–27	Scottish League One	14	4	0	0	4	1	—		18	5
Career total			14	4	0	0	4	1	8	0	26	5
