= Rangers Training Centre =

Training ground in Milngavie

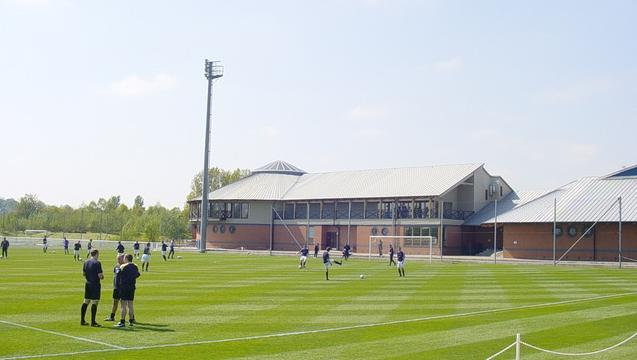
- Interactive map of Rangers Training Centre
- Location: Auchenhowie, Milngavie
- Coordinates: 55.9331929°N 4.3045163°W
- Owner: Rangers F.C.
- Surface: Grass

Construction
- Opened: 4 July 2001
- Cost: £14 million

The Rangers Training Centre is the training ground of Rangers F.C. located in Milngavie, East Dunbartonshire, Scotland. It was opened in 2001 and originally named Murray Park after the then Rangers owner David Murray. It is also often referred to as Auchenhowie, the name of the locality within Milngavie where it is situated.

Following improvements completed in 2019, the facility became the regular home venue for competitive matches played by Rangers' women's team, the club's male under-18 team and some fixtures of the reserve team.

== History ==
=== Development and opening ===
Prior to the construction of the club's own training facility, the first team trained at several locations across Glasgow including Ibrox Stadium, Bellahouston Park and the West of Scotland cricket ground. A dedicated training complex was first proposed by the then manager Dick Advocaat upon his arrival at the club in June 1998. It was officially opened on 4 July 2001 by Advocaat and then-chairman David Murray, after whom it was originally named as Murray Park. The total cost of the complex was estimated at around £14 million.

=== Purchase by Green's consortium and use as a security ===
On 14 June 2012, after the Administration and liquidation of The Rangers Football Club Plc, the training facility was sold along with other Rangers' assets, in a deal worth £5.5m, to The Rangers Football Club Ltd - a consortium led by Charles Green. In July 2014, there was speculation that the Rangers board was looking to sell the facility in order to raise money, due to a fan boycott of season tickets.

=== Renaming ===
The use of the name Murray Park significantly reduced after the club was sold to Craig Whyte in 2011. Moreover, after the liquidation of the company running the club and its assets, many fans held David Murray partly or wholly responsible, and so began calling the facility Auchenhowie (after the geographic area where it is based). In June 2012, the then Rangers Chief executive Charles Green stated he would ask Rangers season ticket holders to vote on renaming the club's training ground. Green proposed that it could be renamed the Moses McNeil Academy or the Davie Cooper Academy after former Rangers players. In June 2016, then chairman Dave King revisited the issue of the renaming of Murray Park and asked Rangers fans to suggest an alternative name.

From June 2018 to 2020, the facility was renamed The Hummel Training Centre as part of a sponsorship deal with Danish sportswear company and then club kit manufacturer Hummel.

== Spectator stand ==
In February 2016, the Rangers Fans Fighting Fund revealed plans to provide £450,000 to build a 264-seater stand at Murray Park. Planning permission was granted in December 2017 for the improvements, which included the stand and further dressing room facilities as well as a classroom area and additional floodlighting. Work began in January 2018 and was completed around 18 months later; the stand was officially opened on 2 August 2019 with an all-seated capacity of 226.

== Structure and facilities ==
The site covers a size of thirty-eight acres (over fifteen hectares). It is divided into three areas: the administration wing, the professional wing for the first team and the youth development wing. The professional and youth wings have their own separate receptions, dining areas, changing rooms, kit stores and lecture rooms. Both share facilities including the gym, medical suite and the indoor synthetic pitch. Outside there are six full-size pitches along with two half-sized, and a practice area. Two of the full-sized and one half-sized pitch are used only by the first team, these have under-soil heating, the others are used by the youth sides.

The gym equipment, costing £150,000, is linked to a computer system which can activate a personalised fitness programme for individual players. The gym also houses an iso-kinetic machine, which allows players to work out despite being injured by testing muscle strength and reactions. There is a hydrotherapy pool that has an angled, movable floor and a series of massage jets and currents that allows a range of rehabilitation exercises to take place. There is also a media editing suite costing £50,000 where a video analyst will video each training session. The footage will be used to conduct tactical lessons in the lecture room afterwards.

== Other uses ==
Rangers training centre is often used by visiting club and national teams playing in Scotland. For example, the South Korea national football team, then managed by Advocaat, hired the facilities for their training before the 2006 FIFA World Cup. In February 2015, Inter Milan trained at the centre after Rangers agreed to allow the Italians use of the facility prior to a UEFA Europa League match against Celtic. This was not the first time Rangers offered support to a club that were to play city rivals Celtic, having made a similar offer to Juventus in 2013 and Blackburn Rovers (who were managed by ex Rangers manager Graeme Souness) in 2002.
