= Danny Röhl =

German footballer and coach (born 1989)

Personal information
- Full name: Danny Röhl
- Date of birth: 28 April 1989 (age 37)
- Place of birth: Zwickau, East Germany
- Position: Defender

Team information
- Current team: Red Bull Salzburg (head coach)

Senior career*
Years	Team	Apps	(Gls)
2007–2008	FSV Zwickau		
2008–2009	FC Sachsen Leipzig II		
2009–2010	FC Eilenburg		

Managerial career
- 2023–2025: Sheffield Wednesday
- 2025–2026: Rangers
- 2026–: Red Bull Salzburg
- * Club domestic league appearances and goals

Danny Röhl (born 28 April 1989) is a German professional football coach and former player who is the head coach of Austrian Bundesliga club Red Bull Salzburg.

Röhl had a brief playing career with FSV Zwickau, FC Sachsen Leipzig II and FC Eilenburg, before retiring aged 21 due to injury.

Röhl has previously worked as a coach at RB Leipzig, Southampton, Bayern Munich and the Germany national team, before entering management with Sheffield Wednesday in October 2023. He left the club after two seasons and was appointed Rangers head coach in October 2025. After one season, he left Rangers to join Red Bull Salzburg.

== Playing career ==
Born in Zwickau, Röhl played as a defender for FSV Zwickau, FC Sachsen Leipzig II and FC Eilenburg in the German lower leagues. He retired from playing aged 21 following an ACL injury.

== Coaching career ==
=== Early career ===
Röhl began coaching at RB Leipzig and Southampton under Ralph Hasenhüttl. In August 2019, Röhl returned to Germany to work with Hansi Flick at Bayern Munich, and later as assistant of the Germany national team.

=== Sheffield Wednesday ===
On 13 October 2023, he was appointed manager of EFL Championship club Sheffield Wednesday, becoming the youngest manager in the English Football League. He said he was looking forward to the challenge of his first managerial position, while player Josh Windass said he was excited to learn from Röhl.

Röhl's first game was a 1–0 defeat away at Watford. His assistant coach Chris Powell urged the club's fans to be patient with Röhl. His first win was a 2–0 victory over Rotherham United in his first home game. Following four wins in seven matches in December 2023, he was nominated for the EFL Championship Manager of the Month. After 11 points from six games in April 2024, he lifted Sheffield Wednesday out of the relegation zone and was nominated for the Manager of the Month award. Röhl secured Championship survival for Wednesday on the final day of the season following a 2–0 victory over Sunderland. Following the conclusion of his debut season, Röhl agreed a contract extension with the club until 2027.

During the following season, he was nominated for Championship Manager of the Month for December 2024, winning 11 points from seven games, with Wednesday coming from behind to win at Derby County and Oxford United, and from 3–0 down to draw at Middlesbrough. In his first full season at the club, Wednesday finished 12th on 58 points.

Röhl's future at the club came into question during the off-season due to the club's ownership and financial issues. He was absent when the players returned in June for the start of pre-season ahead of the 2025–26 season. He returned to training on 14 July 2025, having missed the first two weeks of pre-season. However, on 29 July 2025, it was announced that Röhl had left the club by mutual agreement.

=== Rangers ===
In October 2025, he was linked with the vacancy at Scottish Premiership club Rangers, but he withdrew his application later that month. However, when Kevin Muscat dropped out of the race, Röhl was back in contention, and was appointed as head coach on 20 October 2025 signing a two-and-a-half year deal. The move was described by BBC journalist Tom English as "from [the] frying pan [in]to [the] furnace", whereas Röhl said that "It's amazing to be part of here". Rangers' chairman Andrew Cavenagh defended the appointment process.

Röhl's first match was a 3–0 defeat away against Brann in the UEFA Europa League on 23 October 2025. The first victory of his tenure came three days later, a 3–1 home win against Kilmarnock.

In January 2026, Röhl said he was hoping to achieve a double in his first season, with the aim of winning the league title and the Scottish Cup, after reducing the gap between Rangers and league leaders Heart of Midlothian to six points, as under Röhl, Rangers won 11 of his first 14 league matches in charge. Later that month, Röhl's Rangers moved into second place. That same month, Röhl won his first ever Scottish Premiership Manager of the Month award.

In February 2026, he praised his players for the club's improvement in form, and said he was confident in the team's ability to challenge for the title. They notably beat league leaders Hearts in February to close the gap. He also praised the impact of January signing Ryan Naderi, comparing him to Thomas Muller. By the end of March, a win against Aberdeen saw the gap close further to only three points between them and Hearts, whilst at the Easter weekend, Rangers were top of the table.

However, by early May the club had dropped to 3rd. Later that month there were rumours that Röhl would leave the club after finishing 3rd in the league, although he received backing from the club's board.

=== Red Bull Salzburg ===
In June 2026 he was appointed manager of Red Bull Salzburg. In August 2026 he said he had not been intending to leave Rangers, but that the move to Salzburg was "the right one".

== Personal life ==
Röhl is married with two sons. He worked for ITV as a pundit during Euro 2024.

== Managerial statistics ==
As of 22 November 2026

Managerial record by team and tenure
Team	From	To	Record				
Team	From	To	P	W	D	L	Win %
Sheffield Wednesday	13 October 2023	29 July 2025	89	34	21	34	38.2
Rangers	20 October 2025	17 June 2026	40	22	8	10	55.0
RB Salzburg	17 June 2026	Present	24	16	5	3	66.7
Total			153	72	34	47	47.1

== Honours ==
=== Individual ===
- Scottish Premiership Manager of the Month: January 2026
