= 2024–25 Scottish Cup =

Tournament details
- Country: Scotland
- Dates: 9 August 2024 – 24 May 2025
- Teams: 130

Final positions
- Champions: Aberdeen (8th title)
- Runners-up: Celtic

Tournament statistics
- Matches played: 129
- Goals scored: 456 (3.53 per match)
- Top goal scorer(s): Daizen Maeda; 7 goals

The 2024–25 Scottish Cup (known as the Scottish Gas Men's Scottish Cup for sponsorship reasons) was the 140th season of Scotland's most prestigious football knockout competition.

Celtic were the defending champions after defeating Rangers in the 2024 final. They were defeated in the final by Aberdeen.

== Calendar ==
Round	Original date	Number of fixtures	Clubs	New Entries	Leagues entering at this round
Preliminary round one	10 August 2024	2	130 → 128	6	6 qualifiers
Preliminary round two	31 August 2024	26	128 → 102	48	48 licensed clubs
First round	28 September 2024	30	102 → 72	34	18 Highland League teams 16 Lowland League teams
Second round	26 October 2024	20	72 → 52	10	10 League Two teams
Third round	30 November 2024	20	52 → 32	20	10 Championship teams 10 League One teams
Fourth round	18 January 2025	16	32 → 16	12	12 Premiership teams
Fifth round	8 February 2025	8	16 → 8	None	
Quarter-finals	8 March 2025	4	8 → 4	None	
Semi-finals	19 & 20 April 2025	2	4 → 2	None	
Final	24 May 2025	1	2 → 1	None	

== Preliminary round one ==
The draw for preliminary round one was made on 22 July 2024. The six teams without a SFA club licence were required to be included in the first preliminary round draw – namely Beith Juniors (West of Scotland League champions), Dundee North End (Midlands League champions), Culter (North Region Juniors champions), Cupar Hearts (Amateur Cup winners), Invergordon (North Caledonian League champions), and Bo'ness Athletic (Cup Winners' Shield winners). They were drawn into two ties with Cupar Hearts and Dundee North End drawn to receive a bye to the second preliminary round.

Bo'ness Athletic and Dundee North End took part in the competition for the first time.

=== Matches ===
9 August 2024	Bo'ness Athletic	3–1	Beith Juniors	Bo'ness
19:45	MacDonald 7'; Weir 20'; Cunningham 90'		Monti 64'	Stadium: Newtown Park; Attendance: 456; Referee: Connor Ashwood

10 August 2024	Culter	4–0	Invergordon	Peterculter
15:00	Fraser 40'; Mathers 82', 90+1'; Smart 89'			Stadium: Crombie Park; Referee: Cameron Stirling

== Preliminary round two ==
The draw for preliminary round two was made on 22 July 2024.

Teams in bold advanced to the first round.

East of Scotland League	West of Scotland League	Others
Premier Division: **Dunbar United**; **Dundonald Bluebell**; Dunipace; Edinburgh University; Haddington Athletic; **Hill of Beath Hawthorn**; Hutchison Vale; **Jeanfield Swifts**; **Musselburgh Athletic**; Penicuik Athletic; **Sauchie Juniors**; St Andrews United; **Tynecastle**; First Division: Blackburn United; **Bo'ness Athletic**; **Camelon Juniors**; **Newtongrange Star**; Preston Athletic; **Whitehill Welfare**; Second Division: **Burntisland Shipyard**; Coldstream; **Dalkeith Thistle**; Easthouses Lily Miners Welfare; **Vale of Leithen**; Third Division: Hawick Royal Albert	Premier Division: **Auchinleck Talbot**; Benburb; **Cumnock Juniors**; **Clydebank**; **Darvel**; Glenafton Athletic; Pollok; First Division: **Irvine Meadow**; Kilwinning Rangers; **Rutherglen Glencairn**; Second Division: Bonnyton Thistle; Third Division: **Girvan**; Glasgow University; **Threave Rovers**; Fourth Division: **Carluke Rovers**	SJFA Midlands League: **Dundee North End**; **Lochee United**; Tayport; North Caledonian League: Fort William; Golspie Sutherland; North Region Junior Football League: Culter; South of Scotland League: Creetown; Dalbeattie Star; Newton Stewart; St Cuthbert Wanderers; Wigtown & Bladnoch; Kingdom of Fife AFA: **Cupar Hearts**

=== Matches ===
30 August 2024	**Tynecastle**	**4–0**	Glasgow University	Edinburgh
19:30	10' (o.g.); Cameron 21', 24' (pen.), 45'			Stadium: Meggetland; Referee: Keiran Trayner

30 August 2024	**Bo'ness Athletic**	**2–0**	Kilwinning Rangers	Bo'ness
19:45	Nimmo 41'; MacDonald 49'			Stadium: Newtown Park; Referee: Jordan Curran

31 August 2024	Glenafton Athletic	**2–4**	**Threave Rovers**	New Cumnock
15:00	Mullen 63'; O'Kane 90'		Kerr 25', 38', 45+1'; Irving 75'	Stadium: Loch Park; Referee: Jamie McCunnie

31 August 2024	Coldstream	**0–6**	**Camelon Juniors**	Coldstream
15:00			Miller 41', 45', 46'; Sinclair 68'; Berry 90', 90'	Stadium: Home Park; Referee: Connor Ashwood

31 August 2024	Bonnyton Thistle	**0–1**	**Dunbar United**	Kilmarnock
15:00			Gregory 71'	Stadium: The Synergy Arena; Referee: Robert Bowie

31 August 2024	**Jeanfield Swifts**	**3–0**	Newton Stewart	Perth
15:00	Davies 2'; Brown			Stadium: Riverside Stadium; Referee: Paul Timmons

31 August 2024	**Lochee United**	**4–0**	Hawick Royal Albert	Dundee
15:00	Hay 36', 38', 73'; 78' (o.g.)			Stadium: Thomson Park; Referee: Yaser Razouk

31 August 2024	Golspie Sutherland	**0–2**	**Carluke Rovers**	Golspie
15:00			Patterson 45', 55'	Stadium: King George V Park; Referee: Cameron Stirling

31 August 2024	Pollok	**1–3**	**Darvel**	Glasgow
14:00	Main 70'		Barbour 15'; Gilmartin 28'; Murphy 41'	Stadium: Newlandsfield Park; Attendance: 956; Referee: Andy Gamble

31 August 2024	**Cupar Hearts**	**4–0**	Wigtown & Bladnoch	Glenrothes
14:00	Boylan 53', 57'; Gray 71'; Greenhill 79'			Stadium: Warout Stadium; Referee: Nathan Clac-Mansfield

31 August 2024	Preston Athletic	**2–3**	**Irvine Meadow**	Prestonpans
15:00	Mrowczynski 13'; Weekes 60'		Baird 20'; Neilson 90'; Cruden 90'	Stadium: Pennypit Park; Referee: Jamie Wilkie

31 August 2024	Tayport	**1–3**	**Dundee North End**	Tayport
15:00	McComiskie 18'		Devine 13', 70' (pen.); Ferguson 33'	Stadium: The Canniepairt; Referee: Ryan Kennedy

31 August 2024	Culter	**1–2**	**Sauchie Juniors**	Peterculter
14:30	Ayeaebunam 88'		Hutchison 4'; Kavanagh 60'	Stadium: Crombie Park; Referee: Kieran O'Reilly

31 August 2024	**Dundonald Bluebell**	**3–1**	Edinburgh University	Cardenden
14:30	Brown 21'; Drummond 64'; Battrick 80'		77'	Stadium: Moorside Park; Referee: Ross Birrell

31 August 2024	Fort William	**0–8**	**Hill of Beath Hawthorn**	Fort William
15:00			Tosh 27', 53', 63' (pen.), 72'; Luke 60'; Smith 79'; Allum 85', 89'	Stadium: Claggan Park; Referee: Sean Murdoch

31 August 2024	Benburb	**0–3**	**Vale of Leithen**	Glasgow
15:00			Fam 11'; Mitchell 47'; Taylor 89'	Stadium: New Tinto Park; Attendance: 147; Referee: Abbie Hendry

31 August 2024	**Burntisland Shipyard**	**2–1**	Dunipace	Burntisland
15:00	Anthony 41'; Murphy 63'		Kelly 90'	Stadium: Recreation Park; Attendance: 142; Referee: Steven MacDonald

31 August 2024	Haddington Athletic	**1–4**	**Auchinleck Talbot**	Haddington
15:00	Kennedy 40'		McAvoy 17'; McCubbin-Boyd 57', 77', 80'	Stadium: Millfield Park; Referee: Michael McCart

31 August 2024	Creetown	**1–3**	**Cumnock Juniors**	Creetown
15:00	Fyfe 16'		Orr 56'; Jack 85'; Dykes 90' (pen.)	Stadium: Castlecary Park; Referee: Clyde Buchan

31 August 2024	**Girvan**	**9–0**	St Cuthbert Wanderers	Girvan
15:00	Sisi 3'; Taylor; Dempster; Kerr; Thomson; Howard; Kennedy			Stadium: Hamilton Park; Referee: Brent Falconer

31 August 2024	Penicuik Athletic	**0–1**	**Musselburgh Athletic**	Penicuik
15:00			Reid 60'	Stadium: Montgomery Park; Referee: Ross Menzies

31 August 2024	**Dalkeith Thistle**	**1–0**	Blackburn United	Dalkeith
15:00	Aitchison 70' (pen.)			Stadium: King's Park; Referee: Owen Lawrence

31 August 2024	Dalbeattie Star	**1–2**	**Whitehill Welfare**	Dalbeattie
15:00	Hunter 5'		Hutchison 34'; O'Neill 60'	Stadium: Islecroft Stadium; Referee: Andrew Craven

31 August 2024	**Rutherglen Glencairn**	**2–0**	Hutchison Vale	Rutherglen
14:00	Fitzpatrick 39', 53'			Stadium: The Hamish B. Allan Stadium; Referee: Harry Bruce

31 August 2024	**Clydebank**	**7–0**	St Andrews United	Clydebank
15:00	Little 13'; Samson 45', 52', 63'; Mulcahy 56'; McLernan 80', 87'			Stadium: Holm Park; Referee: Lewis Hogarth

31 August 2024	Easthouses Lily Miners Welfare	**0–4**	**Newtongrange Star**	Easthouses
15:00			Barrowman 4'; Jones 25', 47'; Connor 61'	Stadium: Newbattle Complex; Referee: Thomas Denholm

== First round ==
The draw for the first round was made on 1 September 2024 at 17:30 live on the Scottish Cup YouTube channel.

Teams in bold advanced to the second round.

Carluke Rovers (12th in the West of Scotland Fourth Division) were drawn away from home against Buckie Thistle (5th in the Highland League), 89 places above them in the pyramid system when the clubs met, which represented the biggest league position gap between two teams in the competition's history.

Highland League	Lowland League	East of Scotland League	West of Scotland League	Others
**Banks o' Dee**; **Brechin City**; **Brora Rangers**; **Buckie Thistle**; **Clachnacuddin**; Deveronvale; **Formartine United**; Forres Mechanics; **Fraserburgh**; **Huntly**; **Inverurie Loco Works**; **Keith**; Lossiemouth; Nairn County; Rothes; Strathspey Thistle; **Turriff United**; Wick Academy	Albion Rovers; **Berwick Rangers**; **Bo'ness United**; Broomhill; **Broxburn Athletic**; **Caledonian Braves**; **Civil Service Strollers**; **Cowdenbeath**; Cumbernauld Colts; **East Kilbride**; East Stirlingshire; Gala Fairydean Rovers; Gretna 2008; **Linlithgow Rose**; Tranent; University of Stirling	Premier Division: Dunbar United; Dundonald Bluebell; **Hill of Beath Hawthorn**; **Jeanfield Swifts**; **Musselburgh Athletic**; **Sauchie Juniors**; Tynecastle; First Division: **Bo'ness Athletic**; Camelon Juniors; Newtongrange Star; Whitehill Welfare; Second Division: Burntisland Shipyard; Dalkeith Thistle; Vale of Leithen	Premier Division: **Auchinleck Talbot**; **Clydebank**; Cumnock Juniors; Darvel; First Division: **Irvine Meadow**; Rutherglen Glencairn; Third Division: Girvan; **Threave Rovers**; Fourth Division: Carluke Rovers	SJFA Midlands League: **Dundee North End**; **Lochee United**; Kingdom of Fife AFA: Cupar Hearts

=== Matches ===
27 September 2024	Tynecastle	**2–3**	**Hill of Beath Hawthorn**	Edinburgh
19:30	Jardine 60'; Watt 82'		Watt 24'; Smith 46'; Tosh 65'	Stadium: Meggetland Sports Complex; Referee: Jamie Wilkie

27 September 2024	Dalkeith Thistle	**0–4**	**Broxburn Athletic**	Dalkeith
19:45			Douglas 12', 90+1', 90+4'; Bell 79'	Stadium: King's Park; Referee: Ryan Lee

28 September 2024	Forres Mechanics	**1–2**	**Jeanfield Swifts**	Forres
15:00	McLauchlan 90'		Dodd 45'; McMurchie 85'	Stadium: Mosset Park; Referee: Euan Birch

28 September 2024	University of Stirling	**0–2**	**Caledonian Braves**	Stirling
15:00			McNeil 31', 47'	Stadium: Forthbank Stadium; Referee: Abbie Hendry

28 September 2024	**Brechin City**	**1–0**	Newtongrange Star	Brechin
15:00	MacLeod 90'			Stadium: Glebe Park; Attendance: 448; Referee: Scott McGregor

28 September 2024	**Clachnacuddin**	**3–1**	Nairn County	Inverness
15:00	Anderson 52', 62', 90' (pen.)		Barron 3'	Stadium: Grant Street Park; Referee: Lewis Hogarth

28 September 2024	**Linlithgow Rose**	**3–1**	Lossiemouth	Linlithgow
15:00	Nicolson 16'; Devine 43'; Allan 60'		Morrison 70'	Stadium: Prestonfield; Referee: Michael McCart

28 September 2024	**Musselburgh Athletic**	**1–0** (a.e.t.)	Darvel	Musselburgh
15:00	Court 98'			Stadium: Olivebank Arena; Referee: Harry Bruce

28 September 2024	Gala Fairydean Rovers	**0–1**	**Banks O' Dee**	Galashiels
15:00			Duell 55' (pen.)	Stadium: Netherdale; Referee: Jamie McCunnie

28 September 2024	Broomhill	**0–1**	**Turriff United**	Dumbarton
15:00			Robertson 35'	Stadium: Dumbarton Football Stadium; Referee: Ross Birrell

28 September 2024	**Cowdenbeath**	**3–2**	Rutherglen Glencairn	Cowdenbeath
15:00	Docherty 3', 74'; Haston 68'		Collins 29'; Jarvie 72' (pen.)	Stadium: Central Park; Attendance: 244; Referee: Ross Menzies

28 September 2024	East Stirlingshire	**2–3**	**Lochee United**	Falkirk
15:00	Docherty 26'; Spence 58'		Hay 30', 38'; Linn 77'	Stadium: Falkirk Stadium; Referee: William Wilson

28 September 2024	Cumbernauld Colts	**0–3**	**Civil Service Strollers**	Cumbernauld
15:00			Yeats 24'; McLeod 44'; Findlay 65'	Stadium: Broadwood Stadium; Referee: Cameron Stirling

28 September 2024	Strathspey Thistle	**0–6**	**Sauchie Juniors**	Grantown-on-Spey
15:00			McDowell 20'; 32' (o.g.); Smith 55'; Churchill 67'; Kavanagh 81', 85'	Stadium: Seafield Park; Referee: Jordan Kinnon

28 September 2024	**Formartine United**	**2–0**	Whitehill Welfare	Pitmedden
15:00	Crawford 70' (pen.); Wade 78'			Stadium: North Lodge Park; Referee: Clyde Buchan

28 September 2024	**Fraserburgh**	**8–0**	Rothes	Fraserburgh
15:00	Sopel 4', 34', 68'; Barbour 25'; Sweenie-Rowe 52', 72'; Strachan 55'; Butcher 84'			Stadium: Bellslea Park; Referee: Andrew Craven

28 September 2024	**Threave Rovers**	**6–1**	Vale of Leithen	Castle Douglas
15:00	Irving 40'; Officer 43', 47'; Kerr 72'; Park 75'; Watson 89'		Mitchell 56'	Stadium: Meadow Park; Referee: Thomas Denholm

28 September 2024	**Brora Rangers**	**2–1**	Cumnock Juniors	Brora
15:00	MacRae 60' (pen.); Sutherland 90'		McKee 83'	Stadium: Dudgeon Park; Referee: Keiran Trayner

28 September 2024	**Buckie Thistle**	**2–1**	Carluke Rovers	Buckie
15:00	Peters 73'; McHardy 90'		Steele 5'	Stadium: Victoria Park; Referee: Connor Ashwood

28 September 2024	Burntisland Shipyard	**1–4**	**Irvine Meadow**	Burntisland
15:00	Gibb 66'		McDowall 25'; Kennedy 39'; Cree 72', 90'	Stadium: Recreation Park; Referee: Chris Fordyce

28 September 2024	Dundonald Bluebell	**1–1** (a.e.t.) (**0–3** p)	**Inverurie Loco Works**	Cardenden
15:00	Ellis 75'		Coutts 35'	Stadium: Moorside Park; Referee: Ryan Kennedy
	**Penalties**
	Hendry (penalty missed); L. McKenzie (penalty missed); Orru (penalty missed)		(penalty scored) Coutts; (penalty scored) Dingwall; (penalty scored) Anderson

28 September 2024	**Keith**	**1–1** (a.e.t.) (**4–3** p)	Camelon Juniors	Keith
15:00	McKeown 90'		Taylor 58'	Stadium: Kynoch Park; Referee: Brent Falconer

28 September 2024	**Huntly**	**2–2** (a.e.t.) (**5–3** p)	Wick Academy	Huntly
15:00	Grant 9', 45'		MacGregor 14'; Henderson 76'	Stadium: Christie Park; Referee: Yaser Razouk
	**Penalties**
	Connelly (penalty scored); Grant (penalty scored); Allen (penalty scored); Still (penalty scored); Clark (penalty scored)		(penalty missed) MacAdie; (penalty scored) Henderson; (penalty scored) MacGregor; (penalty scored) Campbell

28 September 2024	**Clydebank**	**3–1**	Girvan	Clydebank
15:00	Grant 33'; Gallacher 50'; Samson 79'		Sisi 32' (pen.)	Stadium: Holm Park; Referee: Nathan Clac-Mansfield

28 September 2024	Dunbar United	**1–4**	**Bo'ness Athletic**	Dunbar
15:00	Goldie 80'		Nimmo 31', 89'; Cunningham 68', 70'	Stadium: New Countess Park; Referee: Ewan Dunn

28 September 2024	**East Kilbride**	**2–0**	Gretna 2008	East Kilbride
15:00	Flanagan 2'; Leitch 59'			Stadium: K-Park Training Academy; Referee: Regan Wallace

28 September 2024	Albion Rovers	**1–2**	**Auchinleck Talbot**	Coatbridge
15:00	Fernie 86'		Nimmo 25'; McCubbin-Boyd 69'	Stadium: Cliftonhill; Referee: Steven J. MacDonald

28 September 2024	**Dundee North End**	**4–0**	Tranent	Dundee
15:00	Ferguson 24'; Blacklock 58'; Sludden 75'; Thomson 90'			Stadium: North End Park; Referee: Owen Lawrence

28 September 2024	**Berwick Rangers**	**4–2**	Cupar Hearts	Berwick-upon-Tweed, England
15:00	Laidlaw 20'; Watson 58'; Devers 87', 89'		Napier 1'; Kelly 81'	Stadium: Shielfield Park; Referee: Kieran O'Reilly

28 September 2024	Deveronvale	**2–4**	**Bo'ness United**	Banff
15:00	Noble 19'; Petermann 90'		Kennedy 12'; Osadolor 36', 90'; Johnston 38'	Stadium: Princess Royal Park; Referee: Conor Greenan

== Second round ==
The draw for the second round was made on 29 September 2024 at 17:00 live on the Scottish Cup YouTube channel.

Teams in bold advanced to the third round.

League Two	Highland League	Lowland League	East of Scotland League	West of Scotland League	SJFA Midlands League
Bonnyrigg Rose; Clyde; East Fife; **Edinburgh City**; **Elgin City**; **Forfar Athletic**; **Peterhead**; **Stirling Albion**; **Stranraer**; The Spartans	**Banks o' Dee**; **Brechin City**; **Brora Rangers**; **Buckie Thistle**; Clachnacuddin; Formartine United; **Fraserburgh**; Huntly; Inverurie Loco Works; Keith; Turriff United	Berwick Rangers; **Bo'ness United**; **Broxburn Athletic**; Caledonian Braves; Civil Service Strollers; **Cowdenbeath**; **East Kilbride**; **Linlithgow Rose**	Premier Division: Hill of Beath Hawthorn; Jeanfield Swifts; **Musselburgh Athletic**; Sauchie Juniors; First Division: Bo'ness Athletic	Premier Division: Auchinleck Talbot; **Clydebank**; First Division: **Irvine Meadow**; Third Division: Threave Rovers	**Dundee North End**; Lochee United

=== Matches ===
25 October 2024	Threave Rovers	**2–3**	**Stranraer**	Castle Douglas
19:45	Cairnie 41'; Irving 54'		Edgar 65', 90'; Lang 79'	Stadium: Meadow Park; Attendance: 1,039; Referee: Greg Soutar

26 October 2024	**Musselburgh Athletic**	**2–1**	Caledonian Braves	Musselburgh
15:00	Barker 57'; Court 65'		Murray 32'	Stadium: Olivebank Arena; Attendance: 598; Referee: Jamie Wilkie

26 October 2024	Sauchie Juniors	**0–2**	**Buckie Thistle**	Sauchie
15:00			Goodall 24'; McHardy 87'	Stadium: Beechwood Park; Attendance: 298; Referee: Euan Birch

26 October 2024	**Fraserburgh**	**3–1** (a.e.t.)	Turriff United	Fraserburgh
15:00	Butcher 42'; Beagrie 96'; Wood 108'		Fatona 74'	Stadium: Bellslea Park; Attendance: 456; Referee: Ryan Kennedy

26 October 2024	The Spartans	**1–2**	**Cowdenbeath**	Edinburgh
15:00	Walls 68'		Walker 38'; Jordan 83'	Stadium: Ainslie Park; Attendance: 361; Referee: Joel Kennedy

26 October 2024	**Forfar Athletic**	**1–0**	Berwick Rangers	Forfar
15:00	Cocks 59'			Stadium: Station Park; Attendance: 445; Referee: Ryan Lee

26 October 2024	Keith	**0–3**	**Clydebank**	Keith
15:00			McHugh 52'; Niven 64'; Little 90' (pen.)	Stadium: Kynoch Park; Attendance: 324; Referee: Lewis Hogarth

26 October 2024	**Peterhead**	**6–3**	Lochee United	Peterhead
15:00	Jason Brown 28', 85'; McCarthy 32'; Dunne 40'; Ross 45'; Smith 74'		Linn 2' (pen.), 15' (pen.), 56'	Stadium: Balmoor Stadium; Attendance: 602; Referee: Sean Murdoch

26 October 2024	**Elgin City**	**1–1** (a.e.t.) (**8–7** p)	Clyde	Elgin
15:00	Murray 88'		Allan 45'	Stadium: Borough Briggs; Attendance: 708; Referee: Peter Stuart
	**Penalties**
	Dingwall (penalty missed); Murray (penalty scored); Gavin (penalty scored); Sargent (penalty missed); Golding (penalty scored); Girvan (penalty scored); Gallagher (penalty missed); Cairns (penalty missed); Leslie (penalty scored); Booth (penalty scored); Glavin (penalty scored); Dingwall (penalty scored)		(penalty scored) McKay; (penalty missed) Murdoch; (penalty missed) Connell; (penalty scored) Dunachie; (penalty scored) Redfern; (penalty scored) Lyon; (penalty missed) Howie; (penalty missed) Houston; (penalty scored) Hemfrey; (penalty scored) Scullion; (penalty scored) Hamilton; (penalty missed) McKay

26 October 2024	**Irvine Meadow**	**3–0**	Civil Service Strollers	Irvine
15:00	McDowall 10'; Kennedy 38'; Baird 44'			Stadium: Meadow Park; Attendance: 233; Referee: Jamie McCunnie

26 October 2024	Inverurie Loco Works	**1–3** (a.e.t.)	**Dundee North End**	Inverurie
15:00	Halliday 17'		Devine 30'; Ferguson 97'; Blacklock 101'	Stadium: Harlaw Park; Attendance: 420; Referee: Keiran Trayner

26 October 2024	Hill of Beath Hawthorn	**0–2**	**Bo'ness United**	Hill of Beath
15:00			Stenhouse 92', 110'	Stadium: Keir's Park; Attendance: 512; Referee: Josh Hay

26 October 2024	**Brechin City**	**3–2**	Huntly	Brechin
15:00	Loudon 32'; Robertson 43' (pen.), 81' (pen.)		Grant 29'; Murray 77'	Stadium: Glebe Park; Attendance: 431; Referee: Michael McCart

26 October 2024	Jeanfield Swifts	**1–1** (a.e.t.) (**4–5** p)	**Edinburgh City**	Perth
15:00	McMurchie 47'		Scally 44'	Stadium: Riverside Stadium; Attendance: 242; Referee: Harry Bruce
	**Penalties**
	Sutherland (penalty scored); Brown (penalty scored); Philp (penalty scored); Yates (penalty scored); Whitehead (penalty missed)		(penalty scored) Young; (penalty scored) Jones; (penalty scored) Hamilton; (penalty scored) Robertson; (penalty scored) Lawson

26 October 2024	**Stirling Albion**	**6–0**	Bo'ness Athletic	Stirling
15:00	Carrick 10', 41'; Hilson 36'; Kerr 49'; Weir 60'; Crane 88'			Stadium: Forthbank Stadium; Attendance: 606; Referee: Andy Gamble

26 October 2024	Auchinleck Talbot	**0–1**	**Broxburn Athletic**	Auchinleck
15:00			Brass 26'	Stadium: Beechwood Park; Attendance: 612; Referee: Cameron Stirling

26 October 2024	**Linlithgow Rose**	**3–0**	Clachnacuddin	Linlithgow
15:00	Skinner 10'; Paterson 73' (pen.); McMartin 90'			Stadium: Prestonfield; Attendance: 748; Referee: Connor Ashwood

26 October 2024	East Fife	**0–1**	**Banks O' Dee**	Methil
15:00			Anderson 22'	Stadium: Bayview Stadium; Attendance: 597; Referee: Daniel Graves

26 October 2024	**East Kilbride**	**3–1**	Bonnyrigg Rose	East Kilbride
15:00	Mimnaugh 23'; Robertson 82' (pen.); Boyd 87'		Ross 59'	Stadium: K-Park Training Academy; Attendance: 366; Referee: Duncan Williams

26 October 2024	**Brora Rangers**	**2–1**	Formartine United	Brora
15:00	MacLeod 50'; Williamson 81'		Wade 15'	Stadium: Dudgeon Park; Attendance: 210; Referee: Ross Birrell

== Third round ==
The draw for the third round was made on 27 October 2024 at 20:00 live on the Scottish Cup YouTube channel.

Teams in bold advanced to the fourth round.

Championship	League One	League Two	Tier 5	Tier 6	Tier 7
**Airdrieonians**; **Ayr United**; **Dunfermline Athletic**; **Falkirk**; Greenock Morton; **Hamilton Academical**; **Livingston**; Partick Thistle; **Queen's Park**; **Raith Rovers**	Alloa Athletic; Annan Athletic; Arbroath; **Cove Rangers**; **Dumbarton**; Inverness Caledonian Thistle; Kelty Hearts; **Montrose**; **Queen of the South**; **Stenhousemuir**	Edinburgh City; **Elgin City**; **Forfar Athletic**; Peterhead; Stirling Albion; Stranraer	Highland League: Banks o' Dee; **Brechin City**; Brora Rangers; Buckie Thistle; **Fraserburgh**; Lowland League: Bo'ness United; **Broxburn Athletic**; Cowdenbeath; East Kilbride; Linlithgow Rose	East of Scotland League Premier Division: **Musselburgh Athletic**; West of Scotland League Premier Division: **Clydebank**; SJFA Midlands League: Dundee North End	West of Scotland League First Division: Irvine Meadow

=== Matches ===
29 November 2024	**Dumbarton**	**3–2**	Alloa Athletic	Dumbarton
19:45	Niang 11'; Hilton 13'; Ruth 39'		Donnelly 43'; Scougall 65'	Stadium: Dumbarton Football Stadium; Attendance: 724; Referee: Ryan Lee

30 November 2024	Stranraer	**1–2** (a.e.t.)	**Broxburn Athletic**	Stranraer
15:00	Dunlop 82'		Page 31'; Locke 97'	Stadium: Stair Park; Attendance: 707; Referee: Sean Murdoch

30 November 2024	Peterhead	**2–3**	**Montrose**	Peterhead
15:00	Barry 39'; Pawlett 90'		Hester 9' (pen.), 16'; Lyons 84'	Stadium: Balmoor Stadium; Attendance: 599; Referee: Colin Whyte

30 November 2024	Linlithgow Rose	**0–4**	**Raith Rovers**	Linlithgow
15:00			Gibson 22'; Easton 49' (pen.), 58'; Hamilton 85'	Stadium: Prestonfield; Attendance: 1,773; Referee: Alastair Grieve

30 November 2024	**Elgin City**	**3–2**	Kelty Hearts	Elgin
15:00	Sargent 43', 83'; Gavin 77'		Flatman 58'; Cunningham 86' (pen.)	Stadium: Borough Briggs; Attendance: 716; Referee: George Calder

30 November 2024	**Clydebank**	**2–0**	Buckie Thistle	Clydebank
15:00	Little 68', 73' (pen.)			Stadium: Holm Park; Attendance: 924; Referee: Alex Shepherd

30 November 2024	**Musselburgh Athletic**	**3–1**	Bo'ness United	Musselburgh
15:00	Evans 11'; Donaldson 61'; Stevenson 87' (pen.)		Stenhouse 27'	Stadium: Olivebank Arena; Attendance: 1,140; Referee: Joel Kennedy

30 November 2024	Cowdenbeath	**1–4** (a.e.t.)	**Brechin City**	Cowdenbeath
15:00	Sutherland 49'		McKay 31', 104', 120'; Moreland 112'	Stadium: Central Park; Attendance: 411; Referee: Jamie McCunnie

30 November 2024	**Cove Rangers**	**2–0**	Inverness Caledonian Thistle	Aberdeen
15:00	Glass 89'; McGrath 90'			Stadium: Balmoral Stadium; Attendance: 539; Referee: Gary Hanvidge

30 November 2024	**Queen's Park**	**2–2** (a.e.t.) (**7–6** p)	Partick Thistle	Glasgow
15:00	Longridge 34'; MacGregor 42'		Crawford 12'; Tizzard 64' (o.g.)	Stadium: Hampden Park; Attendance: 1,769; Referee: Euan Anderson
	**Penalties**
	Thomas (penalty scored); McLeish (penalty scored); Hickey-Fugaccia (penalty missed); Thomson (penalty scored); Longridge (penalty scored); Kerr (penalty scored); Hinds (penalty scored); Scott (penalty scored)		(penalty scored) Turner; (penalty missed) Chalmers; (penalty scored) McBeth; (penalty scored) Milne; (penalty scored) Lawless; (penalty scored) Ablade; (penalty scored) Diack; (penalty missed) O'Reilly

30 November 2024	Banks o' Dee	**1–2**	**Hamilton Academical**	Aberdeen
15:00	Philipson 62'		Shaw 28', 45'	Stadium: Spain Park; Attendance: 350; Referee: Graham Grainger

30 November 2024	**Ayr United**	**2–0**	Greenock Morton	Ayr
15:00	Devlin 63'; Murphy 89'			Stadium: Somerset Park; Attendance: 1,775; Referee: Iain Snedden

30 November 2024	Irvine Meadow	**0–5**	**Stenhousemuir**	Irvine
15:00			O'Reilly 43', 58', 90'; Aitken 48'; Steele 66'	Stadium: Meadow Park; Attendance: 281; Referee: Andy Gamble

30 November 2024	Arbroath	**0–1**	**Queen of the South**	Arbroath
15:00			Doherty 81'	Stadium: Gayfield Park; Attendance: 818; Referee: Peter Stuart

30 November 2024	**Fraserburgh**	**2–0**	Annan Athletic	Fraserburgh
15:00	Wood 39'; Simpson 44'			Stadium: Bellslea Park; Attendance: 346; Referee: Daniel Graves

30 November 2024	**Livingston**	**2–0**	Brora Rangers	Livingston
15:00	McAlear 20'; Yengi 35'			Stadium: Almondvale Stadium; Attendance: 799; Referee: Colin Steven

30 November 2024	**Forfar Athletic**	**3–3** (a.e.t.) (**4–2** p)	Stirling Albion	Forfar
15:00	McLean 39', 51', 102'		Brown 9', 107'; Kerr 20'	Stadium: Station Park; Attendance: 437; Referee: Jordan Curran
	**Penalties**
	McLean (penalty scored); Whatley (penalty scored); Rodden (penalty scored); Allan (penalty scored)		(penalty missed) Brown; (penalty scored) McKinley; (penalty missed) Davidson; (penalty scored) Graham

30 November 2024	Edinburgh City	**1–2**	**Dunfermline Athletic**	Edinburgh
15:00	Young 90' (pen.)		Mebude 5'; Todd 72'	Stadium: Meadowbank Stadium; Attendance: 696; Referee: Duncan Williams

1 December 2024	Dundee North End	**0–1**	**Airdrieonians**	Dundee
13:00			McGregor 6'	Stadium: North End Park; Attendance: 750; Referee: Duncan Nicolson

2 December 2024	East Kilbride	**1–3**	**Falkirk**	East Kilbride
19:45	S. Ferguson 87'		Agyeman 20'; Miller 37'; Morrison 88'	Stadium: K-Park Training Academy; Attendance: 692; Referee: Chris Graham

== Fourth round ==
The draw for the fourth round was made on 2 December 2024 following the East Kilbride v Falkirk match live on BBC Scotland.

Teams in bold advanced to the fifth round.

Premiership	Championship	League One	League Two	Tier 5	Tier 6
**Aberdeen**; **Celtic**; **Dundee**; Dundee United; **Heart of Midlothian**; **Hibernian**; Kilmarnock; Motherwell; **Rangers**; Ross County; **St Johnstone**; **St Mirren**	**Airdrieonians**; **Ayr United**; **Dunfermline Athletic**; Falkirk; **Hamilton Academical**; **Livingston**; **Queen's Park**; **Raith Rovers**	**Cove Rangers**; Dumbarton; Montrose; Queen of the South; Stenhousemuir	Elgin City; Forfar Athletic	Highland League: Brechin City; Fraserburgh; Lowland League: Broxburn Athletic	East of Scotland League Premier Division: Musselburgh Athletic; West of Scotland League Premier Division: Clydebank

=== Matches ===
17 January 2025	Brechin City	**1–4**	**Heart of Midlothian**	Brechin
19:45	Bright 23'		Dhanda 40'; McHattie 52' (o.g.); Kabangu 62', 79'	Stadium: Glebe Park; Attendance: 3,650; Referee: Grant Irvine

18 January 2025	Dumbarton	**1–5**	**Airdrieonians**	Dumbarton
15:00	McGuffie 90'		McGrattan 4'; Gallagher 11'; Mochrie 74'; B.Wilson 76'; Watson 86'	Stadium: Dumbarton Football Stadium; Attendance: 1,113; Referee: Colin Steven

18 January 2025	**Cove Rangers**	**2–0**	Forfar Athletic	Aberdeen
15:00	Emslie 43'; Gaffney 80'			Stadium: Balmoral Stadium; Attendance: 578; Referee: Duncan Williams

18 January 2025	**Dunfermline Athletic**	**3–0**	Stenhousemuir	Dunfermline
15:00	Hamilton 16'; Otoo 41'; McCann 46'			Stadium: East End Park; Attendance: 2,353; Referee: Peter Stuart

18 January 2025	**St Johnstone**	**1–0**	Motherwell	Perth
15:00	Kirk 9'			Stadium: McDiarmid Park; Attendance: 3,892; Referee: John Beaton

18 January 2025	**Queen's Park**	**3–2** (a.e.t.)	Montrose	Glasgow
15:00	McLeish 45'; Rudden 90'; J.Scott 98'		Lyons 56', 60'	Stadium: Hampden Park; Attendance: 856; Referee: Dan McFarlane

18 January 2025	Ross County	**2–3** (a.e.t.)	**Livingston**	Dingwall
15:00	White 56'; Hale 73'		Muirhead 45' (pen.); Montaño 62'; Shinnie 119'	Stadium: Victoria Park; Attendance: 1,802; Referee: Chris Graham

18 January 2025	**Hibernian**	**3–0**	Clydebank	Edinburgh
15:00	Boyle 2', 59'; Molotnikov 46'			Stadium: Easter Road; Attendance: 11,406; Referee: Duncan Nicolson

18 January 2025	Queen of the South	**1–3**	**St Mirren**	Dumfries
15:00	Dickenson 75'		Olusanya 10', 21'; Boyd-Munce 90'	Stadium: Palmerston Park; Attendance: 2,567; Referee: Ryan Lee

18 January 2025	**Hamilton Academical**	**3–1**	Musselburgh Athletic	Hamilton
15:00	Hendrie 24'; McGinty 89'; Shaw 90'		Todd 49'	Stadium: New Douglas Park; Attendance: 1,301; Referee: Graham Grainger

18 January 2025	Elgin City	**0–3**	**Aberdeen**	Elgin
15:00			Morris 21'; Duk 72', 90'	Stadium: Borough Briggs; Attendance: 4,410; Referee: Calum Scott

18 January 2025	Broxburn Athletic	**0–8**	**Ayr United**	Broxburn
15:00			Agbaire 16'; Henderson 38' (pen.), 52', 90'; McKenzie 65'; Oakley 69'; Hastie 70'; Watret 77'	Stadium: Albyn Park; Attendance: 2,100; Referee: Lloyd Wilson

18 January 2025	**Celtic**	**2–1**	Kilmarnock	Glasgow
17:30	McGregor 12'; Maeda 70'		Wales 45'	Stadium: Celtic Park; Attendance: 40,916; Referee: Nick Walsh

19 January 2025	Falkirk	**1–2** (a.e.t.)	**Raith Rovers**	Falkirk
12:00	Morrison 79'		Stanton 86'; Easton 109' (pen.)	Stadium: Falkirk Stadium; Attendance: 4,557; Referee: Don Robertson

19 January 2025	**Rangers**	**5–0**	Fraserburgh	Glasgow
14:15	Dessers 27', 57', 90'; Nsiala 52'; McCausland 74'			Stadium: Ibrox Stadium; Attendance: 36,276; Referee: Iain Snedden

20 January 2025	**Dundee**	**1–0**	Dundee United	Dundee
20:00	Murray 1'			Stadium: Dens Park; Attendance: 9,294; Referee: Matthew MacDermid

== Fifth round ==
The draw for the fifth round was made on 20 January 2025 following the Dundee v Dundee United match live on Premier Sports 1 & the Premier Sports X account.

Teams in bold advanced to the quarter-finals.

Premiership	Championship	League One
**Aberdeen**; **Celtic**; **Dundee**; **Heart of Midlothian**; **Hibernian**; Rangers; **St Johnstone**; St Mirren	Airdrieonians; Ayr United; Dunfermline Athletic; Hamilton Academical; **Livingston**; **Queen's Park**; Raith Rovers	Cove Rangers

=== Matches ===
7 February 2025	Ayr United	**0–1**	**Hibernian**	Ayr
19:45			Bushiri 87'	Stadium: Somerset Park; Attendance: 7,364; Referee: Kevin Clancy

8 February 2025	**Livingston**	**3–0**	Cove Rangers	Livingston
15:00	McGowan 25'; Yengi 81', 83'			Stadium: Almondvale Stadium; Attendance: 1,111; Referee: Matthew MacDermid

8 February 2025	**St Johnstone**	**1–0**	Hamilton Academical	Perth
15:00	Sidibeh 87'			Stadium: McDiarmid Park; Attendance: 3,095; Referee: Nick Walsh

8 February 2025	**Dundee**	**4–0**	Airdrieonians	Dundee
15:00	C.Robertson 13'; Cameron 25', 44'; Adewumi 40'			Stadium: Dens Park; Attendance: 4,335; Referee: Euan Anderson

8 February 2025	**Celtic**	**5–0**	Raith Rovers	Glasgow
17:30	Maeda 6', 45', 77'; McCowan 47'; Yang 56'			Stadium: Celtic Park; Attendance: 39,207; Referee: Chris Graham

9 February 2025	**Aberdeen**	**3–0**	Dunfermline Athletic	Aberdeen
12:30	Guèye 45'; Jensen 50'; Nisbet 85'			Stadium: Pittodrie Stadium; Attendance: 9,893; Referee: Steven McLean

9 February 2025	Rangers	**0–1**	**Queen's Park**	Glasgow
15:30			Drozd 69'	Stadium: Ibrox Stadium; Attendance: 35,628; Referee: Calum Scott

10 February 2025	St Mirren	**1–1** (a.e.t.) (**2–4** p)	**Heart of Midlothian**	Paisley
19:45	Mandron 23'		Nieuwenhof 84'	Stadium: St Mirren Park; Attendance: 4,611; Referee: Don Robertson
	**Penalties**
	Smyth (penalty missed); Scott (penalty missed); Mooney (penalty scored); Fraser (penalty scored)		Wilson (penalty scored); Vargas (penalty scored); Grant (penalty scored); Taylor (penalty missed); Penrice (penalty scored)

== Quarter-finals ==
The draw for the quarter-finals was made on 10 February 2025 following the St Mirren v Heart of Midlothian match live on BBC Scotland.

Teams in bold advanced to the semi-finals.

Premiership	Championship
**Aberdeen**; **Celtic**; Dundee; **Heart of Midlothian**; Hibernian; **St Johnstone**	Livingston; Queen's Park

=== Matches ===
7 March 2025	**Heart of Midlothian**	**3–1**	Dundee	Edinburgh
19:45	Kartum 27', 68'; Murray 63' (o.g.)		Shaughnessy 50'	Stadium: Tynecastle Park; Attendance: 17,975; Referee: Kevin Clancy

8 March 2025	**Aberdeen**	**4–1**	Queen's Park	Aberdeen
12:30	Nisbet 27'; Dabbagh 28', 52'; Shinnie 45'		Rudden 68'	Stadium: Pittodrie Stadium; Attendance: 10,705; Referee: David Dickinson

9 March 2025	**Celtic**	**2–0**	Hibernian	Glasgow
15:00	Maeda 39'; Idah 90'			Stadium: Celtic Park; Attendance: 58,911; Referee: Nick Walsh

10 March 2025	Livingston	**0–1**	**St Johnstone**	Livingston
19:45			Carey 73'	Stadium: Almondvale Stadium; Attendance: 2,603; Referee: Don Robertson

== Semi-finals ==
The draw for the semi-finals was made on 10 March 2025 following the Livingston v St Johnstone match live on BBC Scotland.

Teams in bold advanced to the final.

Premiership
- **Aberdeen**
- **Celtic**
- Heart of Midlothian
- St Johnstone

=== Matches ===
19 April 2025	Heart of Midlothian	**1–2** (a.e.t.)	**Aberdeen**	Glasgow
12:30	Shankland 28'		Gordon 18' (o.g.); Dabbagh 118'	Stadium: Hampden Park; Attendance: 39,836; Referee: John Beaton

20 April 2025	St Johnstone	**0–5**	**Celtic**	Glasgow
15:00			McGregor 34'; Maeda 37', 45+1'; Idah 45'; Jota 67'	Stadium: Hampden Park; Attendance: 43,632; Referee: Calum Scott

== Final ==
24 May 2025
15:00 BST

Aberdeen	1–1 (a.e.t.)	Celtic
Schmeichel 83' (o.g.)	Report	Dorrington 39' (o.g.)
Penalties
Shinnie (penalty scored); Polvara (penalty scored); Dabbagh (penalty scored); Palaversa (penalty scored)	4–3	(penalty missed) McGregor; (penalty scored) Kenny; (penalty scored) McCowan; (penalty scored) Maeda; (penalty missed) Johnston

Hampden Park, Glasgow
Attendance: 49,545
Referee: Don Robertson

== Broadcasting ==
The Scottish Cup is broadcast by Premier Sports and BBC Scotland. Premier Sports has the first two picks and the fifth pick of the fourth and fifth rounds, 2 quarter-finals as well as first pick of one semi-final and airs the final non-exclusively. BBC Scotland broadcasts one match per round from the first round onwards and two matches per round from the fourth round to the quarter-finals, as well as one semi-final and the final.

The following matches were selected for live coverage on UK television:

Round	BBC Scotland	Premier Sports
First round	Dalkeith Thistle v Broxburn Athletic	
Second round	Threave Rovers v Stranraer	
Third round	East Kilbride v Falkirk	
Fourth round	Brechin City v Heart of Midlothian; Rangers v Fraserburgh	Celtic v Kilmarnock; Falkirk v Raith Rovers; Dundee v Dundee United
Fifth round	Ayr United v Hibernian; St Mirren v Heart of Midlothian	Celtic v Raith Rovers; Aberdeen v Dunfermline Athletic; Rangers v Queen's Park
Quarter-finals	Aberdeen v Queen's Park; Livingston v St Johnstone	Heart of Midlothian v Dundee; Celtic v Hibernian
Semi-finals	Heart of Midlothian v Aberdeen	Heart of Midlothian v Aberdeen; St Johnstone v Celtic
Final	Aberdeen v Celtic	Aberdeen v Celtic
