= 2024–25 Heart of Midlothian F.C. season =

Heart of Midlothian
2024–25 season
- Chairman: Ann Budge
- Head Coach: Steven Naismith (until 22 September); Liam Fox (interim); Neil Critchley (from 15 October until 26 April); Liam Fox (interim)
- Stadium: Tynecastle Park
- Premiership: 7th
- Scottish Cup: Semi-final
- League Cup: Second round
- UEFA Europa League: Play-off round
- UEFA Conference League: League phase
- Top goalscorer: League: Lawrence Shankland (8); All: Lawrence Shankland (9)
- Average home league attendance: 18,459
Home colours	Away colours	Third colours

The 2024–25 season was the 144th season of competitive football by Heart of Midlothian. It was the club's fourth season of play back in the top tier of Scottish football since 2020, having been promoted from the Scottish Championship at the end of the previous season, having played just one season in the Scottish Championship. The club had been relegated from the Premiership at the end of the 2019–20 season.

In addition to the domestic league, Hearts competed in the Scottish Cup, the Scottish League Cup the Europa League and the UEFA Conference League.

== Results and fixtures ==
Win Draw Loss Postponed

=== Pre-season / Friendlies ===
Hearts returned for pre-season training on 28 June, with those participating in Euro 2024 and Copa América having staggered returns. They drew in a closed door friendly against Partick Thistle, before heading to Tenerife for a training camp. Hearts returned to Edinburgh to take on Leyton Orient, as part of the club's 150th Anniversary celebrations and remembering the Football Battalion.

The club then welcomed Tottenham Hotspur in a tribute to Dave Mackay, before a closed door game against Burnley and a friendly against Fleetwood Town.

13 July 2024 Friendly	Heart of Midlothian	1–2	Leyton Orient	Tynecastle Park
15:00	Boyce 9'	Report	Brown 24'; Jaiyesimi 46'

17 July 2024 Friendly	Heart of Midlothian	1–5	Tottenham Hotspur	Tynecastle Park
19:00	Shankland 46'	Report	Johnson 39'; Lankshear 55'; Moore 66'; Spence 72'; Neilson 85' (o.g.)	Attendance: 15,646; Referee: Matthew MacDermid

27 July 2024 Friendly	Fleetwood Town	3–0	Heart of Midlothian	Highbury Stadium
15:00	Mayor 28', 60'; Coughlan 31'	Report

9 October 2024 Testimonial	Raith Rovers	3–1	Heart of Midlothian	Stark's Park
19:45
Note: Ross Mathews Testimonial

=== Scottish Premiership ===
3 August 2024 1	Heart of Midlothian	0–0	Rangers	Tynecastle Park
12:30		Report		Attendance: 18,478; Referee: Nick Walsh

10 August 2024 2	Dundee	3–1	Heart of Midlothian	Dens Park
17:30	Tiffoney 23'; Taylor 45+2' (o.g.); McCowan 45+5' (pen.)	Report	Kent 61'	Attendance: 7,266; Referee: Don Robertson

25 August 2024 3	Motherwell	3–1	Heart of Midlothian	Fir Park
15:00	McGinn 24'; O'Donnell 59'; Sparrow 81'	Report	Oda 65'	Attendance: 6,895; Referee: John Beaton

1 September 2024 4	Heart of Midlothian	0–1	Dundee United	Tynecastle Park
15:00		BBC	Graham 76'	Attendance: 18,648; Referee: Walsh

14 September 2024 5	Celtic	2–0	Heart of Midlothian	Celtic Park
15:00	Engels 52' (pen.); McCowan 89'	Report		Attendance: 58,872; Referee: Steven

21 September 2024 6	St Mirren	2–1	Heart of Midlothian	St Mirren Park
15:00	Taylor 8' (o.g.); Olusanya 34'	Report	Halkett 18'	Attendance: 7,341; Referee: Robertson

28 September 2024 7	Heart of Midlothian	1–1	Ross County	Tynecastle Park
15:00	Shankland 90+6'	Report	Hale 35'	Attendance: 18,399; Referee: Iain Snedden

6 October 2024 8	Aberdeen	3–2	Heart of Midlothian	Pittodrie Stadium
15:00	Keskinen 2'; Devlin 65'; Palaversa 88'	Report	Kent 36'; Spittal 63'; Grant (red card) 75'	Attendance: 19,175; Referee: John Beaton

19 October 2024 9	Heart of Midlothian	4–0	St Mirren	Tynecastle Park
15:00	Vargas 15'; Oyegoke 47'; Wilson 86'; Spittal 90+3'	Report		Attendance: 18,757; Referee: Steven

27 October 2024 10	Hibernian	1–1	Heart of Midlothian	Easter Road
12:00	Kukharevych 65'	Report	Wilson 87'	Attendance: 20,011; Referee: Robertson

30 October 2024 11	Heart of Midlothian	1–2	Kilmarnock	Tynecastle Park
19:45	Forrest 44'	Report	Kennedy 58'; Vassell 63'	Attendance: 18,402; Referee: Anderson

2 November 2024 12	St Johnstone	1–2	Heart of Midlothian	McDiarmid Park
15:00	Clark 68' (pen.)	BBC Report	Clark 23' (o.g.); Vargas 76'	Attendance: 5,917; Referee: Graham

10 November 2024 13	Rangers	1–0	Heart of Midlothian	Ibrox Stadium
17:00	Dessers 6'	Report		Attendance: 48,254; Referee: MacDermid

23 November 2024 14	Heart of Midlothian	1–4	Celtic	Tynecastle Park
19:45	Drammeh 82'	Report	Furuhashi 55'; Kühn 60'; Idah 78', 90+4' (pen.)	Referee: McLean

1 December 2024 15	Heart of Midlothian	1–1	Aberdeen	Tynecastle Park
15:00	Devlin 62' (o.g.)	Report	Clarkson 37'	Attendance: 18,810; Referee: Clancy

7 December 2024 16	Heart of Midlothian	2–0	Dundee	Tynecastle Park
15:00	Shankland 21', 31'	Report		Attendance: 18,737; Referee: Colin Steven

15 December 2024 17	Kilmarnock	1–0	Heart of Midlothian	Rugby Park
15:00	Deas (red card) 6'; Anderson 18' (pen.)	Report		Attendance: 5,474; Referee: Robertson

22 December 2024 18	Heart of Midlothian	2–1	St Johnstone	Tynecastle Park
15:00	Penrice 16'; Spittal 58'	Report	Carey 53' (pen.)	Attendance: 18,676; Referee: Beaton

26 December 2024 19	Heart of Midlothian	1–2	Hibernian	Tynecastle Park
12:30	Bushri 45+2' (o.g.)	Report	Rowles 9' (o.g.); Gayle 78'	Attendance: 18,726; Referee: Walsh

29 December 2024 20	Ross County	2–2	Heart of Midlothian	Victoria Park
15:00	Nisbet 90+7'; White 90+9'	BBC Report	Wilson 2', 48'	Attendance: 4,994; Referee: Hardie

2 January 2025 21	Heart of Midlothian	1–0	Motherwell	Tynecastle Park
15:00	Drammeh 7'	Report		Attendance: 18,715; Referee: Scott

5 January 2025 22	Dundee United	0–1	Heart of Midlothian	Tannadice Park
15:00		BBC Report	Penrice 73'	Attendance: 10,214; Referee: MacDermid

12 January 2025 23	Aberdeen	0–0	Heart of Midlothian	Pittodrie Stadium
15:00		BBC Report		Attendance: 17,000; Referee: McLean

25 January 2025 24	Heart of Midlothian	3–2	Kilmarnock	Tynecastle Park
15:00	Kabangu 7'; McCart 58'; Grant 61'	BBC Report	Wales 50'; Murray 67'	Attendance: 18,677; Referee: Beaton

1 February 2025 25	Dundee	0–6	Heart of Midlothian	Dens Park
15:00		BBC Report	Shankland 15'; Spittal 17'; Kabangu 51', 77'; Drammeh 67'; Vargas 90+2'	Attendance: 7,458; Referee: Wilson

16 February 2025 26	Heart of Midlothian	1–3	Rangers	Tynecastle Park
12:00	Michael Steinwender 49'	BBC Report	McCart 20' (og.), 73' (og.); Grant 61'	Attendance: 18,356; Referee: Beaton

23 February 2025 27	St Johnstone	1–2	Heart of Midlothian	McDiarmid Park
12:00	Sidibeh 53'	BBC Report	Kabangu 36', 57'	Attendance: 5,577; Referee: Scott

26 February 2025 28	Heart of Midlothian	3–1	St Mirren	Tynecastle Park
19:45	Wilson 56'; Nieuwenhof 63'; Vargas 90+5'	BBC Report	Mandron 37'	Attendance: 18,770; Referee: Anderson

2 March 2025 29	Hibernian	2–1	Heart of Midlothian	Easter Road
12:30	Boyle 6'; Iredale 74'	BBC Report	Grant 9'	Attendance: 19,873; Referee: Beaton

15 March 2025 30	Heart of Midlothian	2–0	Ross County	Tynecastle Park
15:00	Kabangu 26'; Grant 89'	Report		Attendance: 18,648; Referee: Scott

29 March 2025 31	Celtic	3–0	Heart of Midlothian	Celtic Park
15:00	Maeda 17', 41'; Jota 24'	BBC Report		Referee: Clancy

6 April 2025 32	Heart of Midlothian	0–1	Dundee United	Tynecastle Park
12:30	Wilson (red card) 38'	Report	Dalby 67'	Attendance: 18,888; Referee: Walsh

12 April 2025 33	Motherwell	0–0	Heart of Midlothian	Fir Park
15:00		BBC Report		Attendance: 7,481; Referee: Clancy

26 April 2025 34	Heart of Midlothian	0–1	Dundee	Tynecastle Park
15:00		BBC Report	Murray 38'	Attendance: 18,085; Referee: Hardie

3 May 2025 35	Ross County	1–3	Heart of Midlothian	Victoria Park
15:00	Hale 26'	BBC Report	Shankland 40', 58'; Forrest 82'	Attendance: 4,181; Referee: Robertson

10 May 2025 36	Heart of Midlothian	3–0	Motherwell	Tynecastle Park
15:00	Shankland 30', 60'; Forrest 62'	BBC Report		Attendance: 18,496; Referee: Lee

14 May 2025 37	Heart of Midlothian	2–1	St Johnstone	Tynecastle Park
19:45	Douglas 17' (o.g.); Forrest 31'	BBC Report	Carey 74'	Attendance: 18,021; Referee: Dickinson

18 May 2025 38	Kilmarnock	0–1	Heart of Midlothian	Rugby Park
15:00		BBC Report	Dhanda (red card) 38'; Kingsley 89'	Attendance: 6,601; Referee: McFarlane

=== Scottish Cup ===
17 January 2025 Fourth round	Brechin City	1–4	Heart of Midlothian	Glebe Park
19:45	Bright 23'	BBC Report	Dhanda 40'; McHattie 52' (o.g.); Kabangu 62', 79'	Referee: Irvine

10 February 2025 Fifth round	St Mirren	1–1 (a.e.t.) (2–4 p)	Heart of Midlothian	St Mirren Park
19:45	Mandron 23'	BBC Report	Nieuwenhof 84'	Attendance: 4,611; Referee: Robertson
	Penalties
	Smyth (penalty missed); Scott (penalty missed); Mooney (penalty scored); Fraser (penalty scored)		(penalty scored) Wilson; (penalty scored) Vargas; (penalty scored) Grant; (penalty missed) Taylor; (penalty scored) Penrice

7 March 2025 Quarter-final	Heart of Midlothian	3–1	Dundee	Tynecastle Park
19:45	Kartum 27', 68'; Murray 63' (o.g.)	BBC Report	Shaughnessy 50'	Attendance: 17,975; Referee: Clancy

19 April 2025 Semi-final	Heart of Midlothian	1–2 (a.e.t.)	Aberdeen	Hampden Park
12:30	Shankland 28'; Steinwender (red card) 44'; Devlin (yellow card) 76' (yellow-red card) 116'		Gordon 18' (o.g.); Dabbagh 118'	Attendance: 39,836; Referee: Beaton

=== Scottish League Cup ===
17 August 2024 Second round	Falkirk	2–0	Heart of Midlothian	Falkirk Stadium
15:00	Ross 53'; Tait 81'; Shanley (red card) 90+5'	Report		Attendance: 6,653; Referee: David Dickinson

=== UEFA Europa League ===
==== Play-off round ====
22 August 2024 PO	(Czech Republic) Viktoria Plzeň	1–0	Heart of Midlothian	Doosan Arena
18:00	Oyegoke 90+6' (o.g.)	Report		Attendance: 10,506; Referee: Sven Jablonski

29 August 2024 PO	Heart of Midlothian	0–1 (0–2 agg.)	(Czech Republic) Viktoria Plzeň	Tynecastle Park
19:45		BBC Report	Červ 76'	Attendance: 18,164; Referee: Matej Jug

=== UEFA Conference League ===
==== League phase ====
3 October 2024 1	(Belarus) Dinamo Minsk	1–2	Heart of Midlothian	Sumgayit City Stadium (Note: Due to the country's involvement in the Russian invasion of Ukraine, Belarusian teams were required to play their home matches at neutral venues and behind closed doors. Therefore, Dinamo Minsk played their home matches at Sumgayit City Stadium, Sumgait, Azerbaijan, instead of their regular stadium, Dinamo Stadium, Minsk.)
18:45	Alfred 21'	Report	Politevich 37' (o.g.); Dhanda 90+4'	Attendance: 0 Referee: Al-Hakim

24 October 2024 2	Heart of Midlothian	2–0	(Cyprus) Omonia	Tynecastle Park
18:45 (17:45 UTC+1)	Forrest 16'; Spittal 23'	Report		Attendance: 17,178; Referee: Ocenas

7 November 2024 3	Heart of Midlothian	0–2	(Germany) 1. FC Heidenheim	Tynecastle Park
21:00 (20:00 UTC+1)		Report	Conteh 57'; Schöppner 89'	Attendance: 17,692; Referee: Hagenes

28 November 2024 4	(Belgium) Cercle Brugge	2–0	Heart of Midlothian	Jan Breydel Stadium
18:45	Efekele 40'; Magnée 90'	Report		Attendance: 7,722; Referee: Masiyev

12 December 2024 5	(Denmark) Copenhagen	2–0	Heart of Midlothian	Parken Stadium
18:45	Chiakha 48'; Diks 78' (pen.)	Report		Referee: Colombo

19 December 2024 6	Heart of Midlothian	2–2	(Moldova) Petrocub Hîncești	Tynecastle Park
21:00 (20:00 UTC+0)	Wilson 64'; Spittal 70'	Report	Plătică 20'; Mudrac 83' (pen.)	Attendance: 17,103; Referee: Berka

== First team player statistics ==
=== Captains ===
No	Pos	Country	Name	No of games	Notes
1	FW	(Scotland)	Shankland	39	Team Captain
2	GK	(Scotland)	Gordon	12	Club Captain

Last updated: 18 May 2025
Source: Competitive match reports.
Competitive matches only
Matches started as captain only
Country: FIFA nationality; No.: Squad number; P: Position; Name: Player name; No. Games: Number of games started as captain.

=== Squad information ===
Last updated 18 May 2025

During the 2024–25 campaign, Hearts have used thirty-four players in competitive games. The table below shows the number of appearances and goals scored by each player.

Number	Position	Nation	Name	Totals		Premiership		League Cup		Scottish Cup		Europe	
Number	Position	Nation	Name	Apps	Goals	Apps	Goals	Apps	Goals	Apps	Goals	Apps	Goals
1	GK	(Scotland) SCO	Craig Gordon	46	0	33+0	0	1+0	0	4+0	0	8+0	0
2	DF	(England) ENG	Frankie Kent	26	2	18+0	2	0+0	0	0+1	0	7+0	0
3	DF	(Scotland) SCO	Stephen Kingsley	15	1	8+1	1	1+0	0	0+1	0	4+0	0
4	DF	(Scotland) SCO	Craig Halkett	21	1	13+4	1	1+0	0	1+1	0	1+0	0
6	MF	(Democratic Republic of the Congo) COD	Beni Baningime	34	0	25+3	0	0+0	0	4+0	0	2+0	0
7	MF	(England) ENG	Jorge Grant	40	3	20+10	3	0+1	0	2+1	0	2+4	0
8	MF	(Australia) AUS	Calem Nieuwenhof	14	2	2+10	1	0+0	0	0+2	1	0+0	0
9	FW	(Scotland) SCO	Lawrence Shankland	43	9	29+3	8	0+1	0	3+0	1	7+0	0
10	MF	(Scotland) SCO	Barrie McKay	12	0	2+6	0	0+1	0	0+0	0	1+2	0
12	GK	(Scotland) SCO	Ryan Fulton	3	0	2+1	0	0+0	0	0+0	0	0+0	0
14	MF	(Australia) AUS	Cameron Devlin	41	0	22+7	0	0+1	0	3+0	0	7+1	0
15	DF	(Austria) AUT	Michael Steinwender	12	1	8+1	1	0+0	0	2+1	0	0+0	0
16	MF	(Scotland) SCO	Blair Spittal	48	6	29+6	4	1+0	0	2+2	0	4+4	2
17	MF	(Scotland) SCO	Alan Forrest	42	5	12+19	4	0+1	0	1+2	0	6+1	1
18	DF	(Scotland) SCO	Harry Milne	3	0	3+0	0	0+0	0	0+0	0	0+0	0
19	MF	(Belgium) BEL	Elton Kabangu	18	8	11+3	6	0+0	0	4+0	2	0+0	0
20	MF	(England) ENG	Yan Dhanda	33	2	8+17	0	1+0	0	1+0	1	3+3	1
21	FW	(Scotland) SCO	James Wilson	32	6	15+9	5	0+0	0	1+3	0	1+3	1
25	MF	(Scotland) SCO	Macaulay Tait	2	0	0+0	0	0+0	0	0+0	0	1+1	0
27	MF	(Norway) NOR	Sander Kartum	15	2	5+7	0	0+0	0	1+2	2	0+0	0
28	GK	(Scotland) SCO	Zander Clark	3	0	3+0	0	0+0	0	0+0	0	0+0	0
29	DF	(Scotland) SCO	James Penrice	46	2	32+1	2	1+0	0	4+0	0	7+1	0
30	DF	(Scotland) SCO	Jamie McCart	14	1	10+1	1	0+0	0	3+0	0	0+0	0
35	DF	(Scotland) SCO	Adam Forrester	34	0	19+6	0	0+0	0	4+0	0	4+1	0
37	FW	(Spain) ESP	Musa Drammeh	24	3	12+10	3	0+0	0	0+2	0	0+0	0
77	FW	(Costa Rica) CRC	Kenneth Vargas	42	4	15+15	4	1+0	0	2+1	0	5+3	0
82	DF	(Costa Rica) CRC	Gerald Taylor	13	0	8+0	0	1+0	0	0+2	0	2+0	0
Players transferred or loaned out during the season who made an appearance
5	DF	(England) ENG	Daniel Oyegoke	26	1	14+5	1	0+0	0	0+1	0	2+4	0
11	FW	(Japan) JPN	Yutaro Oda	9	1	1+4	1	1+0	0	0+0	0	0+3	0
15	DF	(Australia) AUS	Kye Rowles	27	0	20+0	0	0+0	0	0+0	0	7+0	0
18	MF	(England) ENG	Malachi Boateng	28	0	14+6	0	1+0	0	0+0	0	6+1	0
23	DF	(Scotland) SCO	Lewis Neilson	7	0	3+2	0	0+0	0	2+0	0	0+0	0
27	FW	(Northern Ireland) NIR	Liam Boyce	15	0	3+7	0	1+0	0	0+0	0	1+3	0
80	DF	(Colombia) COL	Andrés Salazar	1	0	1+0	0	0+0	0	0+0	0	0+0	0

- Last updated: 18 May 2025
- Source: Match Reports
- Ordered by Squad Number.

Appearances (starts and substitute appearances) and goals include those in the Scottish Premiership, League Cup and the Scottish Cup.

=== Disciplinary record ===
During the 2024–25 season, Hearts players were issued eighty-three yellow cards and four red cards. The table below shows the number of cards and type shown to each player.

Last updated 18 May 2025

Number	Position	Nation	Name	Premiership		League Cup		Scottish Cup		Europe		Total	
Number	Position	Nation	Name	Yellow card	Red card	Yellow card	Red card	Yellow card	Red card	Yellow card	Red card	Yellow card	Red card
1	GK	(Scotland)	Craig Gordon	1	0	0	0	0	0	1	0	2	0
2	DF	(England)	Frankie Kent	2	0	0	0	0	0	2	0	4	0
3	DF	(Scotland)	Stephen Kingsley	2	0	0	0	0	0	0	0	2	0
4	DF	(Scotland)	Craig Halkett	2	0	0	0	0	0	1	0	3	0
5	DF	(England)	Daniel Oyegoke	2	0	0	0	0	0	0	0	2	0
6	MF	(Democratic Republic of the Congo)	Beni Baningime	3	0	0	0	0	0	0	0	3	0
7	MF	(England)	Jorge Grant	3	0	0	0	0	0	1	0	4	0
8	MF	(Australia)	Calem Nieuwenhof	0	0	0	0	1	0	0	0	1	0
9	FW	(Scotland)	Lawrence Shankland	7	0	0	0	0	0	1	0	8	0
14	MF	(Australia)	Cameron Devlin	8	0	0	0	2	1	3	0	13	1
15	DF	(Australia)	Kye Rowles	4	0	0	0	0	0	0	0	4	0
15	DF	(Austria)	Michael Steinwender	0	0	0	0	0	1	0	0	0	1
17	MF	(Scotland)	Alan Forrest	2	0	0	0	0	0	0	0	2	0
18	MF	(England)	Malachi Boateng	1	0	0	0	0	0	1	0	2	0
19	FW	(Belgium)	Elton Kabangu	2	0	0	0	0	0	0	0	2	0
20	MG	(England)	Yan Dhanda	2	1	0	0	1	0	0	0	3	1
21	FW	(Scotland)	James Wilson	1	1	0	0	0	0	0	0	1	1
27	FW	(Northern Ireland)	Liam Boyce	0	0	1	0	0	0	0	0	1	0
27	MF	(Norway)	Sander Kartum	1	0	0	0	0	0	0	0	1	0
29	DF	(Scotland)	James Penrice	10	0	0	0	0	0	1	0	11	0
35	DF	(Scotland)	Adam Forrester	3	0	0	0	1	0	2	0	6	0
37	MF	(Spain)	Musa Drammeh	0	0	0	0	1	0	0	0	1	0
77	FW	(Costa Rica)	Kenneth Vargas	2	0	1	0	0	0	1	0	4	0
82	DF	(Costa Rica)	Gerald Taylor	1	0	1	0	0	0	1	0	3	0
Total				59	2	3	0	6	2	15	0	83	4

=== Goal scorers ===
Last updated 18 May 2025

Place	Position	Nation	Name	Premiership	League Cup	Scottish Cup	Europe	Total
1	FW	(Scotland)	Lawrence Shankland	8	0	1	0	9
2	FW	(Belgium)	Elton Kabangu	6	0	2	0	8
3	MF	(Scotland)	Blair Spittal	4	0	0	2	6
3	FW	(Scotland)	James Wilson	5	0	0	1	6
4	MF	(Scotland)	Alan Forrest	4	0	0	1	5
5	FW	(Costa Rica)	Kenneth Vargas	4	0	0	0	4
6	FW	(Spain)	Musa Drammeh	3	0	0	0	3
6	MF	(England)	Jorge Grant	3	0	0	0	3
7	DF	(England)	Frankie Kent	2	0	0	0	2
7	DF	(Scotland)	James Penrice	2	0	0	0	2
7	MF	(England)	Yan Dhanda	0	0	1	1	2
7	MF	(Australia)	Calem Nieuwenhof	1	0	1	0	2
7	MF	(Norway)	Sander Kartum	0	0	2	0	2
8	DF	(Scotland)	Craig Halkett	1	0	0	0	1
8	FW	(Japan)	Yutaro Oda	1	0	0	0	1
8	DF	(England)	Daniel Oyegoke	1	0	0	0	1
8	DF	(Scotland)	Jamie McCart	1	0	0	0	1
8	DF	(Austria)	Michael Steinwender	1	0	0	0	1
8	DF	(Scotland)	Stephen Kingsley	1	0	0	0	1
Own goals				4	0	2	1	7
Total				49	0	9	6	64

=== Assists ===
Last updated 18 May 2025

Place	Position	Nation	Name	Premiership	League Cup	Scottish Cup	Europe	Total
1	FW	(Scotland)	Lawrence Shankland	8	0	1	1	10
2	DF	(Scotland)	James Penrice	5	0	2	0	7
3	MF	(Scotland)	Blair Spittal	3	0	1	0	4
3	MF	(Democratic Republic of the Congo)	Beni Baningime	3	0	1	0	4
3	FW	(Costa Rica)	Kenneth Vargas	3	0	0	1	4
4	MF	(England)	Malachi Boateng	2	0	0	0	2
4	FW	(Northern Ireland)	Liam Boyce	2	0	0	0	2
4	FW	(Scotland)	James Wilson	1	0	1	0	2
5	MF	(Australia)	Cameron Devlin	1	0	0	0	1
5	MF	(England)	Yan Dhanda	1	0	0	0	1
5	DF	(Scotland)	Adam Forrester	1	0	0	0	1
5	DF	(Scotland)	Alan Forrest	1	0	0	0	1
5	FW	(England)	Jorge Grant	1	0	0	0	1
5	FW	(Belgium)	Elton Kabangu	1	0	0	0	1
5	FW	(Spain)	Musa Drammeh	1	0	0	0	1
5	GK	(Scotland)	Ryan Fulton	1	0	0	0	1
Total				35	0	6	2	43

=== Clean sheets ===
R	Pos	Nat	Name	Premiership	League Cup	Scottish Cup	Europe	Total
1	GK	(Scotland)	Craig Gordon	8	0	0	1	9
2	GK	(Scotland)	Zander Clark	1	0	0	0	1
2	GK	(Scotland)	Ryan Fulton	1	0	0	0	1
Total				10	0	0	1	11

Last updated: 14 May 2025
Source: Match reports in Competitive matches

== Team statistics ==
=== League table ===
Pos	Team	Pld	W	D	L	GF	GA	GD	Pts	Qualification or relegation (Note: Teams play each other three times (33 matches), before the league is split into two groups (the top six and the bottom six).)
5	Aberdeen	38	15	8	15	48	61	−13	53	Qualification for the Europa League play-off round (Note: Aberdeen qualified for the Europa League play-off round as the 2024–25 Scottish Cup winners.)
6	St Mirren	38	14	8	16	53	59	−6	50	
7	Heart of Midlothian	38	15	7	16	52	47	+5	52	
8	Motherwell	38	14	7	17	46	63	−17	49	
9	Kilmarnock	38	12	8	18	45	64	−19	44	

Rules for classification: 1) Points; 2) Goal difference; 3) Goals scored; 4) Head-to-head points; 5) Head-to-head goal difference; 6) Play-off (only if deciding champion, UEFA competitions qualification, second stage group allocation or relegation).

=== Division summary ===
Round	1	2	3	4	5	6	7	8	9	10	11	12	13	14	15	16	17	18	19	20	21	22	23	24	25	26	27	28	29	30	31	32	33	34	35	36	37	38
Ground	H	A	A	H	A	A	H	A	H	A	H	A	A	H	H	H	A	H	H	A	H	A	A	H	A	H	A	H	A	H	A	H	A	H	A	H	H	A
Result	D	L	L	L	L	L	D	L	W	D	L	W	L	L	D	W	L	W	L	D	W	W	D	W	W	L	W	W	L	W	L	L	D	L	W	W	W	W
Position	6	10	10	10	12	12	12	12	11	11	12	11	11	11	12	11	12	10	11	11	11	11	11	9	7	9	7	6	7	6	6	6	7	8	8	7	7	7

Updated to match(es) played on 18 May 2025. Source:
A = Away; H = Home; W = Win; D = Draw; L = Loss

=== Uefa Conference League table ===
Pos	Team	Pld	W	D	L	GF	GA	GD	Pts	Qualification
23	(Norwegian Football Federation) Molde	6	2	1	3	10	11	−1	7	Advance to knockout phase play-offs (unseeded)
24	(Football Association of Serbia) TSC	6	2	1	3	10	13	−3	7	Advance to knockout phase play-offs (unseeded)
25	(Scottish Football Association) Heart of Midlothian	6	2	1	3	6	9	−3	7	
26	(Turkish Football Federation) İstanbul Başakşehir	6	1	3	2	9	12	−3	6	
27	(Football Association of the Czech Republic) Mladá Boleslav	6	2	0	4	7	10	−3	6	

Source: UEFA
Rules for classification: League phase tiebreakers

=== Management statistics ===
Last updated 18 May 2025

Name	From	To	P	W	D	L	Win% (Note: Win% is the percentage of matches won rounded to two decimal places.)
Steven Naismith	3 August 2024	22 September 2024	9	0	1	8	0.00
Liam Fox	23 September 2024	15 October 2024	3	1	1	1	33.33
Neil Critchley	15 October 2024	26 April 2025	35	14	6	15	40.00
Liam Fox	26 April 2025	18 May 2025	4	4	0	0	100.00

== Club ==
=== Management ===
The club began the season under the management of Steven Naismith, and assistants Gordon Forrest and Frankie McAvoy. Shortly after the first league game of the season, the management team signed a new contract until 2026. Their deals were previously due to expire in 2025.

After a run of eight straight defeats, and finding themselves at the bottom of the league with just one point, the club parted company with Naismith and his assistants. Including the end of the 23/24 season, Hearts had only achieved one win in fifteen competitive fixtures and experienced the worst start to any season in the club's history.

Hearts CEO Andrew McKinlay stated that Results and performances have fallen below the standards expected at this football club and, unfortunately, there is little evidence of any potential upturn in fortunes.

Hearts B team manager Liam Fox, alongside Lee Wallace and Angus Beith were appointed as the club's interim manager team. On 15 October 2024, Neil Critchley was appointed Head Coach, with Mike Garrity appointed as his assistant.

On 26 April 2025, Critchley and his assistant were sacked by the club. Liam Fox was again asked to oversee the first team on an interim basis.

=== Awards ===
==== SPFL awards ====
Name	Award
Neil Critchley	Scottish Premiership Manager of the Month Award January 2025

==== PFA awards ====
Name	Award
James Penrice	Premiership Team of the Year

==== Club awards ====
Nation	Name	Award
(Scotland)	James Penrice	Players' Player of the Year
(Scotland)	James Penrice	Fans Player of the Year
(Scotland)	Erin Husband	Hearts Women Player's Player of the Year
(Scotland)	Eilidh Shore	Hearts Women Player of the Year
(Scotland)	Gregor Crookston	B Team Player of the Year
(Scotland)	Gregor Crookston	B Team Players' Player of the Year
NA	6-0 Win V Dundee; 1 February 2025; Dens Park	Moment of the season
(Scotland)	Craig Gordon	Save of the Season
(Norway)	Sander Kartum	Goal of the Season
(Scotland)	James Wilson	Special Recognition Award
(Scotland)	Stevie Johnson	FOH Award For Outstanding Service To The Club
(Scotland)	David Allan	Doc Melvin Memorial Cup

=== Playing kit ===
Hearts kits are manufactured by Umbro for the 2024–25 season, entering the final year of their contract with the club. Stellar Omada, became the club's main sponsor on a three-year deal, replacing MND Scotland. Stellar Omada previously sponsored the club's away kit.

=== International Selection ===
Over the course of the season a number of the Hearts squad were called up on international duty. Craig Gordon, Zander Clark, Lawrence Shankland and James Wilson was called up to represent Scotland, whilst Cameron Devlin and Kye Rowles were selected to represent Australia. Kenneth Vargas would also be included in Costa Rica's provisional squad ahead of the 2024 Copa América, with him and Gerald Taylor representing Costa Rica in the CONCACAF Gold Cup.

In addition a number of the Hearts squad were called up to represent Scotland at youth level. Adam Forrester, Finlay Pollock and Liam McFarlane were called up to the under-21 squad, as well as Alfie Osborne and Taylor Hogarth to the under-17 squad. Macaulay Tait was also called up to the Under 21 squad, but opted to remain at his loan club Livingston.

=== Deaths ===
The following players and people associated with the club died over the course of the season. Former goalkeeper Anthony Basso, former goalkeeper Gordon Marshall, former defender David Clunie and supporter Stevie Morris who led the club out at the 2022 Scottish Cup final.

== Transfers ==
=== Players in ===
Player	From	Fee
(Costa Rica) Kenneth Vargas	(Costa Rica) Herediano	Undisclosed
(Scotland) James Penrice	(Scotland) Livingston	Free
(Scotland) Ryan Fulton	(Scotland) Hamilton Academical	Free
(Scotland) Blair Spittal	(Scotland) Motherwell	Free
(England) Daniel Oyegoke	(England) Brentford	Undisclosed
(The Gambia) Musa Drammeh	(Spain) Sevilla Atlético	Free
(England) Yan Dhanda	(Scotland) Ross County	Free
(England) Malachi Boateng	(England) Crystal Palace	Undisclosed
(Scotland) Jamie McCart	(England) Rotherham United	Undisclosed
(Scotland) Aiden Haddow	(Scotland) Celtic	Undisclosed
(Austria) Michael Steinwender	(Sweden) Värnamo	Undisclosed
(Norway) Sander Kartum	(Norway) SK Brann	Undisclosed
(Scotland) Harry Milne	(Scotland) Partick Thistle	Undisclosed

=== Players out ===
Player	To	Fee
(Austria) Peter Haring		Free
(Scotland) Andy Halliday	(Scotland) Motherwell	Free
(Northern Ireland) Michael McGovern	Retired	
(England) Alex Cochrane	(England) Birmingham City	Undisclosed
(Northern Ireland) Makenzie Kirk	(Scotland) St Johnstone	Undisclosed
(Uganda) Toby Sibbick	(England) Wigan Athletic	Undisclosed
(Japan) Kyosuke Tagawa	(Japan) Kashima Antlers	Undisclosed
(Northern Ireland) Liam Boyce	(Republic of Ireland) Derry City	Free
(Australia) Kye Rowles	(United States) D.C. United	Undisclosed
(England) Daniel Oyegoke	(Italy) Hellas Verona	Undisclosed
(England) Malachi Boateng	(England) Plymouth Argyle	Undisclosed
(Japan) Yutaro Oda	(Japan) Shonan Bellmare	Free

=== Loans in ===
Player	From	Fee
(Costa Rica) Gerald Taylor	(Costa Rica) Deportivo Saprissa	Loan
(Colombia) Andrés Salazar	(Colombia) Atlético Nacional	Loan (Note: An initial season long loan, with an option to buy. Salazar's loan was ended by the club in January 2025.)
(Belgium) Elton Kabangu	(Belgium) Union SG	Loan

=== Loans out ===
Player	To	Fee
(Scotland) Harry Stone	(Scotland) Ayr United	Loan
(Scotland) Liam McFarlane	(Scotland) East Fife	Loan
(Scotland) Bailey Dall	(Scotland) Stirling Albion	Loan
(Scotland) Aidan Denholm	(Scotland) Ross County	Loan (Note: Initially a season long loan, Denholm returned to Hearts in January 2025 due to injury.)
(Scotland) Lewis Neilson	(Scotland) St Johnstone	Loan (Note: Initially a season long loan, Neilson was recalled by Hearts on 1st January 2025.)
(Scotland) Finlay Pollock	(Scotland) Raith Rovers	Loan
(Scotland) Callum Sandilands	(Scotland) Montrose	Loan
(Wales) Kai Smutek	(Scotland) Bonnyrigg Rose	Loan
(Scotland) Macaulay Tait	(Scotland) Livingston	Loan
(Scotland) Ethan Drysdale	(Scotland) Partick Thistle	Loan
(Scotland) Bobby McLuckie	(Scotland) Stenhousemuir	Loan

== See also ==
- List of Heart of Midlothian F.C. seasons
