= Adam Forrester =

Scottish association football player (born 2005)

Personal information
- Date of birth: 31 March 2005 (age 21)
- Place of birth: Grangemouth, Falkirk, Scotland
- Position: Right back

Team information
- Current team: Ross County (on loan from Heart of Midlothian)
- Number: 2

Youth career
- 2021–2024: Heart of Midlothian

Senior career*
Years	Team	Apps	(Gls)
2024–	Heart of Midlothian	25	(0)
2025–2026	→ St Johnstone (loan)	17	(0)
2026–	→ Ross County (loan)	2	(0)

International career
2025–	Scotland U21	2	(0)
- * Club domestic league appearances and goals as of 17:27, 11 August 2026 (UTC)

Adam Forrester (born 31 March 2005) is a Scottish professional footballer who plays as a defender for Scottish League One club Ross County, on loan from Scottish Premiership club Heart of Midlothian. Forrester has represented Scotland at U21 level.

== Club career ==
Forrester attended Larbert High School and was a youth at Rangers, before joining the Hearts Academy. He signed his first professional contract with Heart of Midlothian in June 2022 and was the captain of the Hearts B Team in the Lowland League.

He made his professional debut in the Scottish Premiership on 28 September 2024, in a 1–1 draw against Ross County at Tynecastle Park. He then went on to make his European debut in the UEFA Conference League against Dinamo Minsk on 3 October. On 14 November, having been in the final year of his contract, Forrester signed a new contract extending his stay at the club until 2027.

On 7 August 2025, Forrester joined Scottish Championship side St Johnstone on a cooperation agreement loan. On 30 July 2026, Forrester joined Scottish League One side Ross County on loan for the remainder of the season.

== Career statistics ==
As of match played 28 February 2026

Appearances and goals by club, season and competition
Club	Season	League			FA Cup		League Cup		Europe		Total	
Club	Season	Division	Apps	Goals	Apps	Goals	Apps	Goals	Apps	Goals	Apps	Goals
Heart of Midlothian
Heart of Midlothian	2024–25	Scottish Premiership	25	0	4	0	0	0	5	0	34	0
Heart of Midlothian	2025–26	Scottish Premiership	0	0	0	0	1	0	0	0	1	0
Heart of Midlothian	Total		25	0	4	0	1	0	5	0	35	0
St Johnstone (loan)	2025–26	Scottish Championship	17	0	0	0	0	0	0	0	17	0
Career total			42	0	4	0	1	0	5	0	52	0

== Honours ==
St Johnstone

- Scottish Championship: 2025–26
