= Barrie McKay =

Scottish footballer

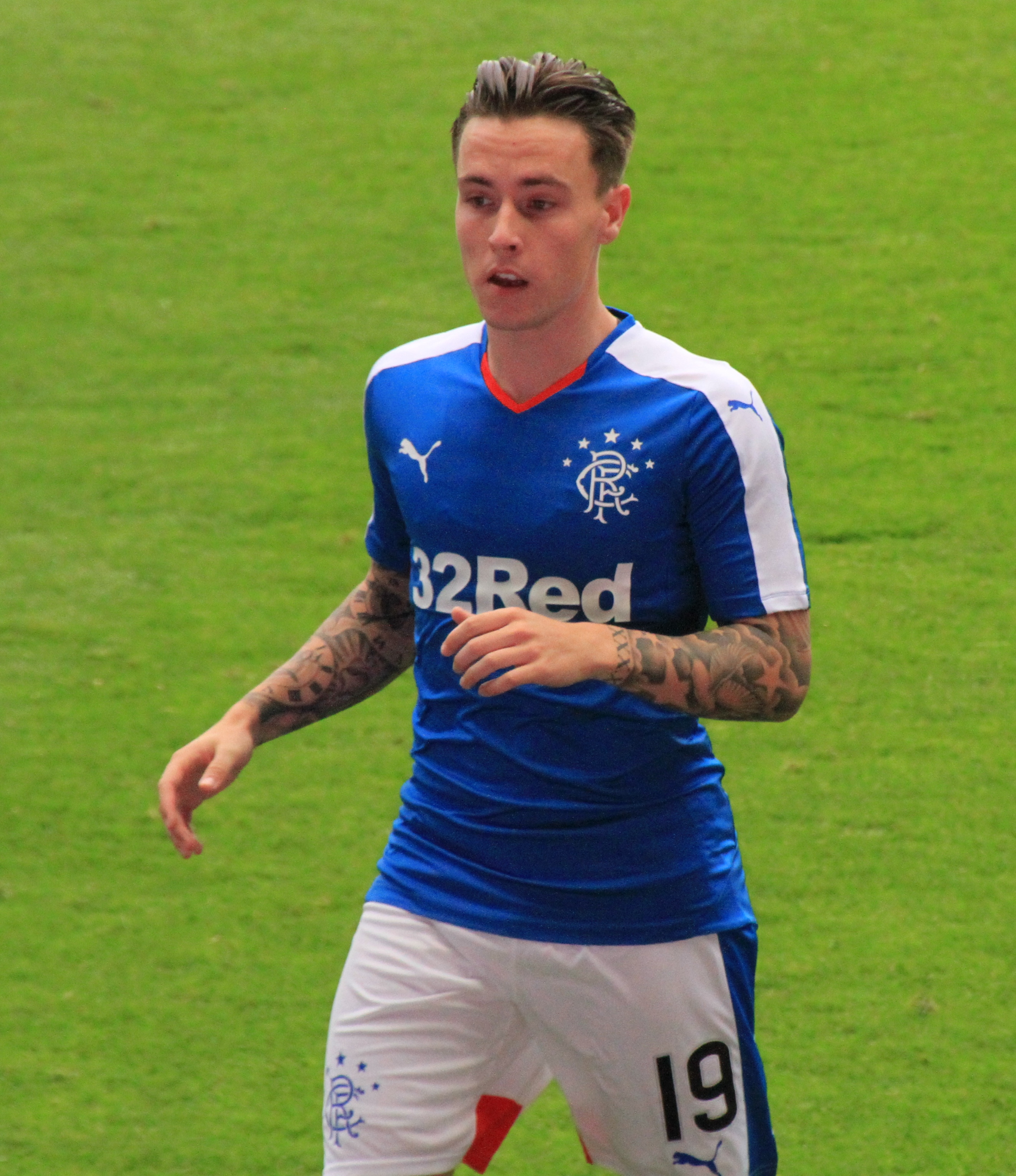
- McKay playing for Rangers in 2015

Personal information
- Full name: Barrie McKay
- Date of birth: 30 December 1994 (age 31)
- Place of birth: Paisley, Renfrewshire, Scotland
- Height: 5 ft 8 in (1.72 m)
- Position: Winger

Team information
- Current team: Hamilton Academical
- Number: 25

Youth career
- 2005–2011: Kilmarnock
- 2011–2012: Rangers

Senior career*
Years	Team	Apps	(Gls)
2012–2017	Rangers	103	(12)
2013–2014	→ Greenock Morton (loan)	18	(5)
2014–2015	→ Raith Rovers (loan)	23	(1)
2017–2018	Nottingham Forest	26	(5)
2018–2021	Swansea City	37	(2)
2020–2021	→ Fleetwood Town (loan)	33	(4)
2021–2025	Heart of Midlothian	89	(6)
2026	Livingston	7	(0)
2026–	Hamilton Academical	0	(0)

International career^{‡}
2012	Scotland U18	23	(5)
2012–2013	Scotland U19	6	(2)
2012–2016	Scotland U21	4	(0)
2016	Scotland	1	(0)
- * Club domestic league appearances and goals as of 11 November 2026 (UTC) ‡ National team caps and goals as of 12 June 2021 (UTC)

Barrie McKay (born 30 December 1994) is a Scottish professional footballer who plays as a winger for Scottish League One club Hamilton Academical. McKay has previously played for Rangers, Greenock Morton, Raith Rovers, Nottingham Forest, Swansea City, Fleetwood Town and Heart of Midlothian. He has also appeared once for the Scotland national team, in 2016.

== Early life ==
McKay was raised in Barrhead and began his career as a youth player for Kilmarnock, where he spent seven years. He was released by Kilmarnock due to a hip problem which their medical staff feared would cause him long-term problems. McKay was then signed by Rangers in the summer of 2011. He played regularly in their under-19 side at the age of 16 and ended the season as top goalscorer.

== Club career ==
=== Rangers ===
McKay made his first-team debut for Rangers on 13 May 2012, in a 4–0 win against St Johnstone. On 11 August 2012, he scored Rangers first goal in their first match in the Third Division, a 2–2 draw against Peterhead. On 11 September 2012, McKay pledged his future to Rangers for another five-years. After a great start to the season, his form dropped and as a result he was dropped to the bench with Fraser Aird taking his place. After a few matches on the sidelines, he reclaimed his place in the starting eleven with a stunning performance from the bench against Alloa Athletic, in which he scored two goals in a 7–0 win. From that point on, McKay established himself as a key player in the team, putting in several excellent performances, including in a 3–0 win against Elgin City and a 4–2 win against Montrose, racking up a number of assists in the process.

On 27 December 2013, he joined Greenock Morton on a one-month loan deal. As there were no U20 League fixtures until January 2014, this was to give him some much needed game time, with McKay expected to be available for five fixtures in his time at Cappielow. On 28 January 2014, his loan was extended until the end of the season.

McKay signed for Scottish Championship club Raith Rovers on 1 September 2014, agreeing a loan move until 1 January 2015. On 31 December 2014, it was announced by Raith Rovers that McKay's loan deal had been extended until the end of 2014–15 season.

The arrival of new Rangers manager Mark Warburton in June 2015 saw McKay appear more frequently in the first team. On 19 August 2015, he scored his first goal for Rangers since November 2012, in a 2–0 win over Ayr United in the Scottish Challenge Cup. On 15 February 2016, McKay extended his Rangers contract until May 2018. On 17 April 2016, he scored a long-range goal to put Rangers 2–1 up against Celtic in the Scottish Cup semi-final. After the match finished 2–2, Rangers went on to win on penalties and progress to the final, with McKay scoring in the penalty shootout. He was named in the PFA Scotland Team of the Year from the Scottish Championship for his performances in the 2015–16 season.

=== Nottingham Forest ===
McKay signed a four-year contract with Nottingham Forest on 5 July 2017 for a reported fee of £500,000, linking up with Warburton once again. He was assigned squad number 10. On his début on 4 August 2017, he scored the only goal of the game against Millwall.

=== Swansea City ===
On 31 July 2018, McKay signed a three-year contract with Swansea City, having moved from Nottingham Forest for an undisclosed fee.

On 31 January 2020, McKay joined Fleetwood Town on loan until the end of the 2019–20 season. He returned to Fleetwood in September 2020, again on loan.

McKay was confirmed to be leaving the Welsh club at the end of the 2020–21 season.

=== Hearts ===
On 7 September 2021 McKay signed with Hearts on a two-year deal.

He departed the club at the end of the 2024–25 season.

=== Livingston ===
On 13 February 2026, McKay signed for Livingston on a deal until the end of the 2025–26 season. He departed the club upon the expiry of his contract.

=== Hamilton Academical ===
On 11 November 2026, McKay joined Scottish League One club Hamilton Academical on a short-term deal.

== International career ==
McKay was a youth international, representing the Scotland national team at under-18, under-19 and under-21 levels.

McKay received his first call-up to the senior Scotland squad in May 2016, along with Rangers teammate Lee Wallace, for friendlies against Italy and France and made his Scotland debut as an 84th-minute substitute during a 3–0 defeat to the latter on 4 June 2016.

Six years later, he received his second call-up for the UEFA Nations League match against Ukraine after Scott McTominay was suspended for picking up a booking against the Republic of Ireland.

== Personal life ==
He is the younger brother of fellow footballer Daniel McKay, and has two other brothers.

== Career statistics ==
=== Club ===
As of 2 December 2024

Appearances and goals by club, season and competition
Club	Season	League			National Cup		League Cup		Other		Total	
Club	Season	Division	Apps	Goals	Apps	Goals	Apps	Goals	Apps	Goals	Apps	Goals
Rangers	2011–12	Scottish Premier League	1	0	0	0	0	0	0	0	1	0
Rangers	2012–13	Scottish Third Division	31	1	3	2	4	0	3 (Note: Appearances in Scottish Challenge Cup)	1	41	4
Rangers	2013–14	Scottish League One	2	0	0	0	1	0	1	1	4	1
Rangers	2014–15	Scottish Championship	0	0	0	0	0	0	0	0	0	0
Rangers	2015–16	Scottish Championship	34	6	6	2	3	0	5	1	48	9
Rangers	2016–17	Scottish Premiership	35	5	4	0	7	1	—		46	6
Rangers	Total		103	12	13	4	15	1	9	3	140	20
Greenock Morton (loan)	2013–14	Scottish Championship	18	3	0	0	0	0	0	0	18	3
Raith Rovers (loan)	2014–15	Scottish Championship	23	1	2	1	0	0	0	0	25	2
Nottingham Forest	2017–18	Championship	26	5	1	0	1	0	—		28	5
Swansea City	2018–19	Championship	30	2	1	1	0	0	—		31	3
Swansea City	2019–20	Championship	4	0	1	0	3	0	—		8	0
Swansea City	Total		34	2	2	1	3	0	0	0	39	3
Fleetwood Town (loan)	2019–20	League One	8	2	0	0	0	0	2 (Note: Appearances in League One play-offs)	0	10	2
Fleetwood Town (loan)	2020–21	League One	23	2	0	0	0	0	2 (Note: Appearances in the EFL Trophy)	1	25	3
Fleetwood Town (loan)	Total		31	4	0	0	0	0	4	1	35	5
Heart of Midlothian	2021–22	Scottish Premiership	33	2	5	0	0	0	—		38	2
Heart of Midlothian	2022–23	Scottish Premiership	37	4	3	0	1	0	8	0	49	4
Heart of Midlothian	2023–24	Scottish Premiership	11	0	1	0	1	0	2	0	15	0
Heart of Midlothian	2024–25	Scottish Premiership	8	0	0	0	1	0	3	0	12	0
Heart of Midlothian	Total		89	6	9	0	3	0	13	0	114	6
Career total			324	33	27	6	22	1	26	4	399	44

=== International ===
As of match played 4 June 2016

Appearances and goals by national team and year
National team	Year	Apps	Goals
Scotland national team	2016	1	0
Scotland national team	Total	1	0

== Honours ==
Rangers

- Scottish Third Division: 2012–13
- Scottish Championship: 2015–16
- Scottish Challenge Cup: 2015–16

Individual

- Scottish Championship PFA Scotland Team of the Year: 2015–16
- PFA Scotland Goal of the Season: 2015–16
