= 2023–24 Heart of Midlothian F.C. season =

Heart of Midlothian
2023–24 season
- Chairman: Ann Budge
- Head coach: Steven Naismith
- Stadium: Tynecastle Park
- Premiership: 3rd
- Scottish Cup: Semi-finals
- League Cup: Semi-finals
- Europa Conference League: Play-off round
- Top goalscorer: League: Lawrence Shankland (24); All: Lawrence Shankland (31)
- Highest home attendance: 18,936 vs. Hibernian, Premeirship, 28 February 2024
- Lowest home attendance: 12,841, vs. Partick Thistle, League Cup, 20 August 2023
- Average home league attendance: 18,406
Home colours	Away colours	Third colours

The 2023–24 season was the 143rd season of competitive football by Heart of Midlothian. It was the club's third season of play back in the top tier of Scottish football.

They also competed in the Scottish Cup, Scottish League Cup, and the Europa Conference League.

== Results and fixtures ==
Win Draw Loss Postponed

=== Pre-season / Friendlies ===
6 July 2023 Friendly	Heart of Midlothian	0–1	Plymouth Argyle	Marbella Training Centre
15:00		Report	Issaka 20'

9 July 2023 Friendly	Dunfermline Athletic	1–1	Heart of Midlothian	East End Park
15:00	Haring 86' (o.g.)	Report	Rathie 85'	Attendance: 4,883; Referee: Graham Grainger

30 July 2023 Friendly	Heart of Midlothian	0–1	Leeds United	Tynecastle Park
15:00		Report	Ayling 38'	Attendance: 16,641; Referee: David Dickinson

=== Scottish Premiership ===
5 August 2023 1	St Johnstone	0–2	Heart of Midlothian	McDiarmid Park
15:00		Report	Oda 75'; Shankland 90+6'	Attendance: 6,818; Referee: Steven McLean

13 August 2023 2	Heart of Midlothian	0–0	Kilmarnock	Tynecastle Park
15:00		Report		Attendance: 18,455; Referee: David Dickinson

27 August 2023 3	Dundee	1–0	Heart of Midlothian	Dens Park
15:00	McCowan 63'	Report		Attendance: 8,104; Referee: Alan Muir

3 September 2023 4	Heart of Midlothian	0–1	Motherwell	Tynecastle Park
15:00		Report	Slattery 29'; McGinn (red card) 69'	Attendance: 18,353; Referee: Grant Irvine

16 September 2023 5	Heart of Midlothian	2–0	Aberdeen	Tynecastle Park
15:00	Oda 14'; Boyce 64'	Report		Attendance: 18,626; Referee: Kevin Clancy

23 September 2023 6	St Mirren	1–0	Heart of Midlothian	St Mirren Park
15:00	Strain 7'	Report		Attendance: 7,537; Referee: Nick Walsh

30 September 2023 7	Ross County	0–1	Heart of Midlothian	Victoria Park
15:00		Report	Forrest 69'	Attendance: 4,773; Referee: David Dickinson

7 October 2023 8	Heart of Midlothian	2–2	Hibernian	Tynecastle Park
15:00	Forrest 28'; Doidge 58' (o.g.)	Report	Youan 66', 68'	Attendance: 18,675; Referee: William Collum

22 October 2023 9	Heart of Midlothian	1–4	Celtic	Tynecastle Park
14:15	Shankland 64'	Report	O'Riley 4'; Maeda 23'; Furuhashi 51'; Iwata 81'	Attendance: 17,608; Referee: Nick Walsh

29 October 2023 10	Rangers	2–1	Heart of Midlothian	Ibrox Stadium
15:00	Tavernier 90' (pen.); Danilo 90+3'	Report	Shankland 5'	Attendance: 49,530; Referee: John Beaton

1 November 2023 11	Heart of Midlothian	1–0	Livingston	Tynecastle Park
19:45	Vargas 79'	Report		Attendance: 17,970; Referee: Chris Graham

11 November 2023 12	Motherwell	1–2	Heart of Midlothian	Fir Park
15:00	Spittal 78' (Penalty)	Report	Shankland 27', 71'	Attendance: 5,884; Referee: David Munro

25 November 2023 13	Heart of Midlothian	1–0	St Johnstone	Tynecastle Park
15:00	Shankland 61'	Report		Attendance: 18,678; Referee: John Beaton

2 December 2023 14	Kilmarnock	0–1	Heart of Midlothian	Rugby Park
15:00		Report	Dennis 18' (o.g.)	Attendance: 5,915; Referee: David Dickinson

6 December 2023 15	Heart of Midlothian	0–1	Rangers	Tynecastle Park
19:45		Report	Sima 34'	Attendance: 17,759; Referee: William Collum

9 December 2023 16	Aberdeen	2–1	Heart of Midlothian	Pittodrie Stadium
15:00	Miovski 53'; Clarkson 90+2'	Report	Shankland 20'	Attendance: 16,064; Referee: Chris Graham

16 December 2023 17	Celtic	0–2	Heart of Midlothian	Celtic Park
15:00		BBC Report	Shankland 15'; Kingsley 30'	Referee: Kevin Clancy

23 December 2023 18	Heart of Midlothian	2–0	St Mirren	Tynecastle Park
15:00	Shankland 33', 49'	Report		Attendance: 18,717; Referee: Nick Walsh

27 December 2023 19	Hibernian	0–1	Heart of Midlothian	Easter Road
20:00		BBC Report	Shankland 90+3'	Attendance: 20,150; Referee: John Beaton

30 December 2023 20	Heart of Midlothian	2–2	Ross County	Tynecastle Park
15:00	Vargas 71'; Shankland 79'	Report	Cochrane 55' (o.g.); Dhanda 61'	Attendance: 18,288; Referee: Alan Muir

2 January 2024 21	Livingston	1–2	Heart of Midlothian	Tony Macaroni Arena
15:00	Shinnie 79' (Penalty)	BBC Report	Shankland (penalty missed); Vargas 53'; Shankland 64'	Referee: David Dickinson

23 January 2024 22	Heart of Midlothian	3–2	Dundee	Tynecastle Park
19:45	Nieuwenhof 57'; Shankland (penalty missed); Lembikisa 74'; Oda 86'	BBC Report	McGhee 19'; Cameron 38'	Attendance: 18,185; Referee: Chris Graham

27 January 2024 23	Heart of Midlothian	2–0	Aberdeen	Tynecastle Park
15:00	Grant 57' (pen.); Shankland 77'	BBC Report		Attendance: 18,790; Referee: Kevin Clancy

3 February 2024 24	Dundee	2–3	Heart of Midlothian	Dens Park
15:00	McGhee 26'; Cameron 59'	BBC Report	Forrest 55'; Shankland 79' (pen.), 87'	Attendance: 7,506; Referee: Graham Grainger

7 February 2024 25	St Johnstone	0–1	Heart of Midlothian	McDiarmid Park
19:45		BBC Report	Shankland 55'	Attendance: 4,518; Referee: Iain Snedden

17 February 2024 26	Heart of Midlothian	2–0	Motherwell	Tynecastle Park
15:00	Shankland 68'; Vargas 90+2'	BBC Report		Attendance: 18,748; Referee: Chris Graham

24 February 2024 27	Rangers	5–0	Heart of Midlothian	Ibrox Stadium
15:00	Diomande 2'; Cortés 37'; Dessers 44', 48'; Silva 65'	BBC Report		Attendance: 50,354; Referee: Nick Walsh

28 February 2024 28	Heart of Midlothian	1–1	Hibernian	Tynecastle Park
19:45	Shankland 45+2' (pen.)	BBC Report	Marcondes 28'	Attendance: 18,936; Referee: Kevin Clancy

3 March 2024 29	Heart of Midlothian	2–0	Celtic	Tynecastle Park
12:00	Grant 43' (pen.); Shankland 56'	BBC Report	Yang (red card) 16'	Attendance: 17,748; Referee: Don Robertson

16 March 2024 30	Ross County	2–1	Heart of Midlothian	Victoria Park
15:00	Murray 42', 49'	BBC Report	Oda 90+1'	Attendance: 5,267; Referee: Grant Irvine

30 March 2024 31	Heart of Midlothian	1–1	Kilmarnock	Tynecastle Park
15:00	Vargas 10'	Report	Watkins 67'	Attendance: 18,799; Referee: William Collum

6 April 2024 32	St Mirren	1–2	Heart of Midlothian	St Mirren Park
15:00	Olusanya 68'	Report	Grant 33' (pen.); Mandron 66' (o.g.)	Attendance: 7,740; Referee: Alan Muir

13 April 2024 33	Heart of Midlothian	4–2	Livingston	Tynecastle Park
15:00	Grant 29'; Oda 32'; Devlin 40'; Shankland 45+6' (Penalty)	BBC Report	Kelly 10', 22'; Yengi (yellow card) 58' (yellow-red card)	Attendance: 18,491; Referee: Colin Steven

27 April 2024 34	Kilmarnock	0–0	Heart of Midlothian	Rugby Park
15:00		Sky Sports Report		Attendance: 6,677; Referee: Ross Hardie

4 May 2024 35	Celtic	3–0	Heart of Midlothian	Celtic Park
15:00	Furuhashi 4', 21'; O'Riley 87' (pen.)	Report		Attendance: 59,038; Referee: Kevin Clancy

11 May 2024 36	Heart of Midlothian	3–0	Dundee	Tynecastle Park
15:00	Vargas 35'; Forrest 53'; Shankland 90+1'	Report		Attendance: 18,757; Referee: Nick Walsh

15 May 2024 37	St Mirren	2–2	Heart of Midlothian	St Mirren Park
19:45	Scott 7'; Bolton 65'	Report	Tagawa 20'; Shankland 72'	Attendance: 7,222; Referee: William Collum

18 May 2024 38	Heart of Midlothian	3–3	Rangers	Tynecastle Park
12:30	Shankland 33'; Lembikisa 82'; Tagawa 90+5'	Report	McCausland 52'; Cantwell 69'; Silva 79'	Attendance: 18,131; Referee: Don Robertson

=== Scottish Cup ===
20 January 2024 Fourth round	The Spartans	1–2	Heart of Midlothian	Ainslie Park
12:15	Craigen 64'	Report	Vargas 12'; Kent 90+2'	Attendance: 3,500; Referee: William Collum

11 February 2024 Fifth round	Airdrieonians	1–4	Heart of Midlothian	Excelsior Stadium
17:00	Frizzell 34'	Report	Shankland 11', 73'; Vargas 18'; Nieuwenhof 21'	Attendance: 6,555; Referee: Steven McLean

11 March 2024 Quarter-final	Greenock Morton	0–1	Heart of Midlothian	Cappielow
19:45		BBC Report	Vargas 86'	Attendance: 7,143; Referee: David Dickinson

21 April 2024 Semi-final	Rangers	2–0	Heart of Midlothian	Hampden Park
15:00	Dessers 5', 78'	BBC Report		Referee: Steven McLean

=== Scottish League Cup ===
20 August 2023 Second round	Heart of Midlothian	4–0	Partick Thistle	Tynecastle Park
14:00	Graham 11' (o.g.); Offiah 45'; Shankland 48'; Tagawa 74'	Report		Attendance: 12,841; Referee: John Beaton

26 September 2023 Quarter-final	Kilmarnock	1–2	Heart of Midlothian	Rugby Park
19:45	Lyons 68'	report	Grant 40'; Lowry 90+2'	Attendance: 6,104; Referee: Steven McLean

5 November 2023 Semi-final	Heart of Midlothian	1–3	Rangers	Hampden Park
15:00	Shankland 81' (pen.)	Report	Tavernier 50' (pen.), 64'; Wright 55'	Attendance: 44,734; Referee: Nick Walsh

=== UEFA Europa Conference League ===
==== Third qualifying round ====
10 August 2023 QR3	(Norway) Rosenborg	2–1	Heart of Midlothian	Lerkendal Stadion
19:00	Frederiksen 14'; Nelson 45+1'	Report	Shankland 78'	Attendance: 11,882; Referee: Andrei Chivulete

17 August 2023 QR3	Heart of Midlothian	3–1 (4–3 agg.)	(Norway) Rosenborg	Tynecastle Park
19:45	Shankland 13'; Devlin 50', 90+2'	Report	Þorvaldsson 5'	Attendance: 17,942; Referee: David Fuxman

==== Play-off round ====
24 August 2023 PO	Heart of Midlothian	1–2	(Greece) PAOK	Tynecastle Park
19:45	Shankland 9' (pen.)	Report	Shwab 12'; Živković 75'	Attendance: 17,409; Referee: Andris Treimanis

31 August 2023 PO	(Greece) PAOK	4–0 (6–1 agg.)	Heart of Midlothian	Toumba Stadium
19:45	Taison 16', 71'; Thomas 23'; Konstantelias 58'	Report		Attendance: 19,032; Referee: Guillermo Cuadra Fernández

== First team player statistics ==
=== Squad information ===
During the 2023–24 campaign, Hearts have used thirty players in competitive games. The table below shows the number of appearances and goals scored by each player.

Number	Position	Nation	Name	Totals		Premiership		Europe		League Cup		Scottish Cup	
Number	Position	Nation	Name	Apps	Goals	Apps	Goals	Apps	Goals	Apps	Goals	Apps	Goals
1	GK	(Scotland) SCO	Craig Gordon	7	0	3+0	0	0+0	0	0+0	0	4+0	0
2	DF	(England) ENG	Frankie Kent	44	1	35+0	0	4+0	0	3+0	0	2+0	1
3	DF	(Scotland) SCO	Stephen Kingsley	44	0	30+3	0	3+1	0	2+1	0	4+0	0
4	DF	(Scotland) SCO	Craig Halkett	10	0	4+4	0	0+0	0	0+0	0	2+0	0
5	DF	(Austria) AUT	Peter Haring	8	0	5+1	0	0+1	0	0+1	0	0+0	0
6	MF	(Democratic Republic of the Congo) COD	Beni Baningime	36	0	25+4	0	1+0	0	1+1	0	4+0	0
7	MF	(England) ENG	Jorge Grant	33	5	15+11	4	0+1	0	2+0	1	4+0	0
8	MF	(Australia) AUS	Calem Nieuwenhof	29	2	21+4	1	0+0	0	3+0	0	1+0	1
9	FW	(Scotland) SCO	Lawrence Shankland	47	31	36+1	24	4+0	3	3+0	2	3+0	2
10	FW	(Northern Ireland) NIR	Liam Boyce	22	1	7+8	1	3+1	0	0+3	0	0+0	0
11	FW	(Japan) JPN	Yutaro Oda	31	5	11+14	5	2+1	0	0+1	0	1+1	0
13	DF	(Australia) AUS	Nathaniel Atkinson	26	0	14+5	0	4+0	0	0+0	0	1+2	0
14	MF	(Australia) AUS	Cameron Devlin	31	3	16+7	1	4+0	2	1+1	0	2+0	0
15	DF	(Australia) AUS	Kye Rowles	42	0	31+2	0	3+0	0	3+0	0	2+1	0
16	MF	(Scotland) SCO	Andy Halliday	6	0	0+3	0	0+2	0	0+1	0	0+0	0
17	MF	(Scotland) SCO	Alan Forrest	41	4	20+13	4	1+1	0	1+1	0	4+0	0
18	MF	(Scotland) SCO	Barrie McKay	15	0	4+7	0	1+1	0	1+0	0	0+1	0
19	DF	(England) ENG	Alex Cochrane	40	0	31+0	0	4+0	0	2+0	0	2+1	0
21	DF	(Uganda) UGA	Toby Sibbick	28	0	11+10	0	1+2	0	3+0	0	1+0	0
22	MF	(Scotland) SCO	Aidan Denholm	22	0	9+6	0	1+2	0	0+2	0	0+2	0
24	MF	(Scotland) SCO	Finlay Pollock	1	0	0+1	0	0+0	0	0+0	0	0+0	0
25	MF	(Scotland) SCO	Macaulay Tait	13	0	2+9	0	0+0	0	0+0	0	0+2	0
28	GK	(Scotland) SCO	Zander Clark	42	0	35+0	0	4+0	0	3+0	0	0+0	0
29	DF	(England) ENG	Odeluga Offiah	9	1	3+2	0	0+2	0	1+1	1	0+0	0
29	MF	(Scotland) SCO	Scott Fraser	12	0	4+7	0	0+0	0	0+0	0	0+1	0
30	FW	(Japan) JPN	Kyosuke Tagawa	19	3	4+8	2	0+3	0	0+1	1	1+2	0
51	MF	(Scotland) SCO	Alex Lowry	17	1	10+2	0	1+2	0	1+1	1	0+0	0
54	FW	(Scotland) SCO	James Wilson	3	0	0+2	0	0+0	0	0+0	0	0+1	0
77	FW	(Costa Rica) CRC	Kenneth Vargas	42	9	20+13	6	2+0	0	3+0	0	4+0	3
81	FW	(Jamaica) JAM	Dexter Lembikisa	18	2	12+2	2	0+0	0	0+0	0	2+2	0

- Last updated: 18 May 2024
- Source: Match Reports
- Ordered by Squad Number.

Appearances (starts and substitute appearances) and goals include those in the Scottish Premiership, European Competitions, League Cup and the Scottish Cup.

=== Disciplinary record ===
Last updated 18 May 2024

Number	Position	Nation	Name	Premiership		League Cup		Scottish Cup		Europe		Total	
Number	Position	Nation	Name	Booked	Sent off (straight red)	Booked	Sent off (straight red)	Booked	Sent off (straight red)	Booked	Sent off (straight red)	Booked	Sent off (straight red)
2	DF	(England)	Frankie Kent	4	0	0	0	0	0	0	0	4	0
3	DF	(Scotland)	Stephen Kingsley	0	0	1	0	0	0	0	0	1	0
4	DF	(Scotland)	Craig Halkett	1	0	0	0	0	0	0	0	1	0
5	MF	(Austria)	Peter Haring	2	0	1	0	0	0	0	0	3	0
6	MF	(Democratic Republic of the Congo)	Beni Baningime	2	0	0	0	0	0	0	0	2	0
7	MF	(England)	Jorge Grant	1	0	1	0	1	0	0	0	3	0
8	MF	(Australia)	Calem Nieuwenhof	5	0	1	0	0	0	0	0	6	0
9	FW	(Scotland)	Lawrence Shankland	7	0	0	0	1	0	3	0	11	0
10	FW	(Northern Ireland)	Liam Boyce	2	0	0	0	0	0	0	0	2	0
11	FW	(Japan)	Yutaro Oda	2	0	0	0	0	0	0	0	2	0
13	DF	(Australia)	Nathaniel Atkinson	5	0	0	0	0	0	0	0	5	0
14	MF	(Australia)	Cameron Devlin	7	0	1	0	2	0	3	0	13	0
15	DF	(Australia)	Kye Rowles	5	0	1	0	0	0	0	0	6	0
16	MF	(Scotland)	Andy Halliday	1	0	0	0	0	0	0	0	1	0
17	MF	(Scotland)	Alan Forrest	3	0	0	0	0	0	0	0	3	0
19	DF	(England)	Alex Cochrane	7	0	0	0	0	0	1	0	8	0
21	DF	(Uganda)	Toby Sibbick	3	0	1	0	0	0	1	0	5	0
22	MF	(Scotland)	Aidan Denholm	1	0	1	0	0	0	1	0	3	0
25	MF	(Scotland)	Macaulay Tait	3	0	0	0	1	0	0	0	4	0
29	DF	(England)	Odeluga Offiah	1	0	0	0	0	0	0	0	1	0
51	MF	(Scotland)	Alex Lowry	1	0	0	0	0	0	0	0	1	0
77	FW	(Costa Rica)	Kenneth Vargas	6	0	0	0	0	0	0	0	6	0
81	FW	(Jamaica)	Dexter Lembikisa	1	0	0	0	0	0	0	0	1	0
Total				70	0	8	0	5	0	9	0	92	0

=== Goal scorers ===
Last updated 18 May 2024

Place	Position	Nation	Name	Premiership	League Cup	Scottish Cup	Europe	Total
1	FW	(Scotland)	Lawrence Shankland	24	2	2	3	31
2	FW	(Costa Rica)	Kenneth Vargas	6	0	3	0	9
3	MF	(England)	Jorge Grant	4	1	0	0	5
3	FW	(Japan)	Yutaro Oda	5	0	0	0	5
4	MF	(Scotland)	Alan Forrest	4	0	0	0	4
5	MF	(Australia)	Cameron Devlin	1	0	0	2	3
5	FW	(Japan)	Kyosuke Tagawa	2	1	0	0	3
7	FW	(Jamaica)	Dexter Lembikisa	2	0	0	0	2
8	FW	(Northern Ireland)	Liam Boyce	1	0	0	0	1
8	DF	(England)	Frankie Kent	0	0	1	0	1
8	DF	(Scotland)	Stephen Kingsley	1	0	0	0	1
8	MF	(Australia)	Calem Nieuwenhof	0	0	1	0	1
8	MF	(Scotland)	Alex Lowry	0	1	0	0	1
8	DF	(England)	Odeluga Offiah	0	1	0	0	1
Total				48	6	7	5	66

=== Assists ===
Last updated 18 May 2024

Place	Position	Nation	Name	Premiership	League Cup	Scottish Cup	Europe	Total
1	FW	(Scotland)	Lawrence Shankland	4	1	1	1	7
2	DF	(England)	Alex Cochrane	4	0	2	0	6
2	MF	(England)	Jorge Grant	4	0	2	0	6
3	FW	(Northern Ireland)	Liam Boyce	3	1	0	0	4
3	FW	(Scotland)	Alan Forrest	4	0	0	0	4
3	DF	(England)	Frankie Kent	4	0	0	0	4
4	MF	(Scotland)	Alex Lowry	1	2	0	0	3
5	MF	(Scotland)	Scott Fraser	1	0	1	0	2
5	MF	(Scotland)	Barrie McKay	2	0	0	0	2
5	MF	(Australia)	Calem Nieuwenhof	2	0	0	0	2
5	FW	(Costa Rica)	Kenneth Vargas	2	0	0	0	2
7	DF	(Democratic Republic of the Congo)	Beni Baningime	1	0	0	0	1
7	GK	(Scotland)	Zander Clark	1	0	0	0	1
7	DF	(Scotland)	Aidan Denholm	1	0	0	0	1
7	MF	(Australia)	Cameron Devlin	1	0	0	0	1
7	DF	(Scotland)	Stephen Kingsley	0	0	0	1	1
7	FW	(Japan)	Yutaro Oda	1	0	0	0	1
7	DF	(Scotland)	Macaulay Tait	1	0	0	0	1
Total				36	4	6	2	48

=== Clean sheets ===
R	Pos	Nat	Name	Premiership	League Cup	Scottish Cup	Europe	Total
1	GK	(Scotland)	Zander Clark	16	1	0	0	17
2	GK	(Scotland)	Craig Gordon	1	0	1	0	2
Total				17	1	1	0	19

Last updated: 27 April 2024
Source: Match reports in Competitive matches

== Club statistics ==
=== League table ===
Pos	Team	Pld	W	D	L	GF	GA	GD	Pts	Qualification or relegation (Note: Teams play each other three times (33 matches), before the league is split into two groups (the top six and the bottom six).)
1	Celtic (C)	38	29	6	3	95	30	+65	93	Qualification for the Champions League league stage
2	Rangers	38	27	4	7	87	32	+55	85	Qualification for the Champions League third qualifying round
3	Heart of Midlothian	38	20	8	10	54	42	+12	68	Qualification for the Europa League play-off round (Note: As the winners of the 2023–24 Scottish Cup, Celtic, qualified for the Champions League, the berth reserved for the cup winners (Europa League play-off round) passed to the third-placed team. The berths for the Europa League second qualifying round and the Conference League second qualifying round were passed down to the fourth- and fifth-placed teams.)
4	Kilmarnock	38	14	14	10	46	44	+2	56	Qualification for the Europa League second qualifying round
5	St Mirren	38	13	8	17	46	52	−6	47	Qualification for the Conference League second qualifying round

Rules for classification: 1) Points; 2) Goal difference; 3) Goals scored; 4) Head-to-Head points; 5) Head-to-Head goal difference; 6) Play-off (only if deciding champion, UEFA competitions qualification, second stage group allocation or relegation).
(C) Champions

=== Division summary ===
Round	1	2	3	4	5	6	7	8	9	10	11	12	13	14	15	16	17	18	19	20	21	22	23	24	25	26	27	28	29	30	31	32	33	34	35	36	37	38
Ground	A	H	A	H	H	A	A	H	H	A	H	A	H	A	H	A	A	H	A	H	A	H	H	A	A	H	A	H	H	A	H	A	H	H	A	H	A	H
Result	W	D	L	L	W	L	W	D	L	L	W	W	W	W	L	L	W	W	W	D	W	W	W	W	W	W	L	D	W	L	D	W	W	D	L	W	D	D
Position	2	3	5	8	5	6	4	4	4	7	4	4	4	3	3	5	3	3	3	3	3	3	3	3	3	3	3	3	3	3	3	3	3	3	3	3	3	3

Updated to match(es) played on 18 May 2024. Source:
A = Away; H = Home; W = Win; D = Draw; L = Loss

=== Management statistics ===
Last updated 18 May 2024

Name	From	To	P	W	D	L	Win% (Note: Win% is the percentage of matches won rounded to two decimal places.)
Steven Naismith	20 August 2023	-	49	26	8	15	53.06

== Club ==
=== Management ===
On 7 June, Steven Naismith was appointed the club's technical director, having been named interim manager the previous season. Naismith's title of technical director was designated due to the fact he had not yet achieved the required licences in order to represent the club in European competition.

=== Awards ===
==== SPFL awards ====
Name	Award
Steven Naismith	Scottish Premiership Manager of the Month Award November 2023
Lawrence Shankland	Scottish Premiership Player of the Month Award December 2023
Lawrence Shankland	Scottish Premiership Player of the season
Lawrence Shankland	Scottish Premiership Golden Boot

==== PFA/SFWA awards ====
Name	Award
Lawrence Shankland	Premiership Player of the Year
Lawrence Shankland	Scottish Football Writers' Association Player of the Year

==== Club awards ====
Nation	Name	Award
(Scotland)	Lawrence Shankland	Players' Player of the Year
(Scotland)	Lawrence Shankland	Fans Player of the Year
(England)	Katie Lockwood	Hearts Women Player of the Year
(Scotland)	Callum Sandilands	B Team Player of the Year
(Scotland)	Liam McFarlane	B Team Players' Player of the Year
NA	Comeback Win V Rosenborg; 17 August 2023; Tynecastle Stadium	Moment of the season
(Scotland)	Jess Husband	Hearts Women Rising Star
(Scotland)	Zander Clark	Save of the Season
(Scotland)	Alan Forrest	Goal of the Season
(Scotland)	J.P Ellis	FOH Award For Outstanding Service To The Club
(Scotland)	Graeme Pacitti	Doc Melvin Memorial Cup

== Transfers ==
=== Players in ===
Player	From	Fee
(Northern Ireland) Michael McGovern	(England) Norwich City	Free
(Australia) Calem Nieuwenhof	(Australia) Western Sydney Wanderers	Undisclosed
(England) Frankie Kent	(England) Peterborough United	Undisclosed
(Japan) Kyosuke Tagawa	(Japan) FC Tokyo	Undisclosed

=== Players out ===
Player	To	Fee
(Scotland) Scott McGill	(Scotland) Raith Rovers	Free
(Northern Ireland) Michael Smith	(England) Yeovil Town	Free
(Scotland) Gary Mackay-Steven	(Scotland) Kilmarnock	Free
(Scotland) Ross Stewart	(Scotland) Partick Thistle	Free
(Scotland) Euan Henderson	(Scotland) Hamilton Academical	Free
(England) Josh Ginnelly	(Wales) Swansea City	Free
(Germany) Orestis Kiomourtzoglou	(Germany) Greuther Fürth	Undisclosed
(Scotland) Connor Smith	(Scotland) St Johnstone	Free

=== Loans in ===
Player	From	Fee
(Scotland) Alex Lowry	(Scotland) Rangers	Loan (Note: Season Long Loan was ended by Hearts in January 24.)
(Costa Rica) Kenneth Vargas	(Costa Rica) Herediano	Loan
(England) Odeluga Offiah	(England) Brighton and Hove Albion	Loan
(Jamaica) Dexter Lembikisa	(England) Wolverhampton Wanderers	Loan
(Scotland) Scott Fraser	(England) Charlton Athletic	Loan

=== Loans out ===
Player	To	Fee
(Scotland) Lewis Neilson	(Scotland) Partick Thistle	Loan
(Scotland) Connor Smith	(England) Scunthorpe United	Loan
(Scotland) Harry Stone	(Scotland) Queen of the South	Loan
(Northern Ireland) Makenzie Kirk	(Scotland) Hamilton Academical	Loan
(Scotland) Callum Flatman	(Scotland) Edinburgh City	Loan
(Scotland) Andy Halliday	(Scotland) Motherwell	Loan
(Northern Ireland) Michael McGovern	(Scotland) Livingston	Loan
