= Macaulay Tait =

Scottish association football player

Personal information
- Full name: Macaulay John Tait
- Date of birth: 27 August 2005 (age 21)
- Place of birth: Dalkeith, Midlothian, Scotland
- Height: 1.68 m (5 ft 6 in)
- Position: Midfielder

Team information
- Current team: St Johnstone
- Number: 25

Youth career
- Arniston Rangers YFC
- Lochend Boys Club
- Celtic
- Heart of Midlothian

Senior career*
Years	Team	Apps	(Gls)
2023–2026	Heart of Midlothian	12	(0)
2025	→ Livingston (loan)	15	(0)
2025–2026	→ Livingston (loan)	33	(0)
2026–	St Johnstone	0	(0)

International career
2024–	Scotland U19	3	(0)
- * Club domestic league appearances and goals as of 20 May 2026

Macaulay John Tait (born 27 August 2005) is a Scottish professional footballer who plays as a midfielder for Scottish Premiership club St Johnstone.

== Career ==
Tait began his career with Arniston Rangers YFC before moving on to Lochend Boys Club, where he was scouted and joined Celtic aged eight; before joining Heart of Midlothian's academy. He signed a two-year deal with the club in April 2023 having impressed for the reserve side in the Lowland Football League, whom he captained.

Having made his debut in December 2023, he signed a new four-year deal in February 2024.

On 24 January 2025, Tait joined Scottish Championship side Livingston on loan for the remainder of the season. Tait featured 23 times for Livingston, helping them to a second-placed finish in the Championship. Livingston would go on to play-off success, with Tait playing in both the semi-final and final victories, which secured promotion back to the Premiership.

On 27 June 2025, Hearts announced that Tait had re-joined Livingston on a season-long loan.

== Career statistics ==
As of match played 19 July 2025

Club	Season	League			Scottish Cup		League Cup		Europe		Other		Total	
Club	Season	Division	Apps	Goals	Apps	Goals	Apps	Goals	Apps	Goals	Apps	Goals	Apps	Goals
Heart of Midlothian	2023–24	Scottish Premiership	12	0	2	0	0	0	0	0	–		14	0
Heart of Midlothian	2024–25	Scottish Premiership	0	0	0	0	0	0	2 (Note: Appearances in UEFA Conference League)	0	–		2	0
Heart of Midlothian	Total		12	0	2	0	0	0	2	0	–		16	0
Livingston (loan)	2024–25	Scottish Championship	15	0	2	0	0	0	–		6 (Note: Two appearances in Scottish Challenge Cup, four appearances in Scottish Premiership play-offs)	0	23	0
Livingston (loan)	2025–26	Scottish Premiership	16	0	0	0	5	1	–		–		3	1
Career total			27	0	4	0	3	1	2	0	6	0	42	1

== Honours ==
Livingston

- Scottish Challenge Cup: 2024–25
- Scottish Premiership play-offs: 2025
