= Elton Kabangu =

Belgian footballer (born 1998)

Personal information
- Full name: Elton Daniël Kabangu
- Date of birth: 8 February 1998 (age 28)
- Place of birth: Kortrijk, Belgium
- Height: 1.78 m (5 ft 10 in)
- Position: Winger

Team information
- Current team: Heart of Midlothian
- Number: 14

Youth career
- Gent

Senior career*
Years	Team	Apps	(Gls)
2016–2019	Gent	0	(0)
2017–2019	→ Eindhoven (loan)	74	(18)
2019–2023	Willem II	58	(16)
2023–2025	Union SG	22	(1)
2025	→ Heart of Midlothian (loan)	14	(6)
2025–	Heart of Midlothian	13	(0)
- * Club domestic league appearances and goals as of 20 March 2026

Elton Daniël Kabangu (born 8 February 1998) is a Belgian professional footballer who plays as a winger for Scottish Premiership club Heart of Midlothian.

== Career ==
Kabangu made his Eerste Divisie debut for FC Eindhoven on in a game against SC Telstar and scored twice after coming off the bench late in the first half of the 2–2 draw.

On 9 June 2023, Belgian Pro League side Union SG confirmed the signing of Kabangu until 2026.

On 1 January 2025, Scottish Premiership side Heart of Midlothian confirmed the signing of Kabangu on loan until the end of the 2024–25 season. The move was made permanent at the end of the season, with Kabangu signing a three-year contract.

== Personal life ==
Born in Belgium, Kabangu is of Congolese descent. Kabangu was in a coma for 16 days after contracting COVID-19. He had an infection in his lungs but credits his Christian faith with helping him recover - "It was a battle for me, but I'm a believer in Jesus, so I know it's part of the plan. I accepted it. I survived it. I came back and that's the most important thing for me."

== Career statistics ==
As of 20 March 2026

Appearances and goals by club, season and competition
Club	Season	League			Cup		League Cup		Other		Total	
Club	Season	Division	Apps	Goals	Apps	Goals	Apps	Goals	Apps	Goals	Apps	Goals
Eindhoven	2017-18	Eerste Divisie	38	10	2	0	0	0	0	0	40	10
Eindhoven	2018-19	Eerste Divisie	36	8	1	0	0	0	0	0	37	8
Eindhoven	Total		74	18	3	0	0	0	0	0	77	18
Willem II	2019-20	Eredivisie	4	0	0	0	0	0	0	0	4	0
Willem II	2020-21	Eredivisie	0	0	0	0	0	0	0	0	0	0
Willem II	2021-22	Eredivisie	24	3	0	0	0	0	0	0	24	3
Willem II	2022-23	Eerste Divisie	30	13	0	0	0	0	0	0	30	13
Willem II	Total		58	16	0	0	0	0	0	0	58	16
Union SG	2023-24	Belgian Pro League	15	1	3	0	0	0	1	0	19	1
Union SG	2024-25	Belgian Pro League	7	0	1	1	0	0	5	0	13	1
Union SG	Total		22	1	4	1	0	0	6	0	32	2
Heart of Midlothian	2024–25	Scottish Premiership	14	6	4	2	0	0	0	0	18	8
Heart of Midlothian	2025–26	Scottish Premiership	13	0	1	0	5	1	0	0	19	1
Heart of Midlothian	Total		27	6	5	2	5	1	0	0	37	9
Career total			181	41	12	3	5	1	6	0	204	45
