= Kenneth Vargas =

Costa Rican footballer (born 2002)

Personal information
- Full name: Kenneth Gerardo Vargas Vargas
- Date of birth: 17 April 2002 (age 24)
- Place of birth: San José, Costa Rica
- Height: 1.78 m (5 ft 10 in)
- Position: Forward

Team information
- Current team: Kalamata (on loan from Heart of Midlothian)
- Number: 77

Youth career
- –2020: Herediano

Senior career*
Years	Team	Apps	(Gls)
2020–2024	Herediano	55	(12)
2020–2022	→ Municipal Grecia (loan)	28	(5)
2023–2024	→ Heart of Midlothian (loan)	33	(6)
2024–	Heart of Midlothian	29	(4)
2025	→ Herediano (loan)	7	(1)
2026	→ Alajuelense (loan)	11	(3)
2026–	→ Kalamata (loan)	2	(3)

International career^{‡}
2023	Costa Rica U23	11	(5)
2023–	Costa Rica	21	(3)
- * Club domestic league appearances and goals as of 22 August 2026 ‡ National team caps and goals as of 18 November 2025

Kenneth Gerardo Vargas Vargas (born 17 April 2002) is a Costa Rican professional footballer who plays as a forward for Super League Greece club Kalamata, on loan from Scottish Premiership club Heart of Midlothian and the Costa Rica national team.

== Club career ==
=== Herediano and Grecia loan ===
Vargas played for Municipal Grecia on loan from C.S. Herediano. After returning to Herediano, he scored on his senior league debut for the club, against Grecia, on 15 January 2022. He went on to score 10 goals in 41 appearances in the Liga FPD, the Costa Rican first division, in 2022.

=== Heart of Midlothian ===
On 7 August 2023, Vargas joined Scottish Premiership club Heart of Midlothian on a season-long loan deal from Herediano, with an option to purchase outright.

Vargas was permanently signed by Hearts on 26 March 2024 on a five-season contract.

On 17 September 2025, Vargas returned to Herediano on loan until January 2026. Heredia was willing to pay only 6% of his salary loan from Scottish Premiership club Heart of Midlothian. Due to the disagreement on his salary and personal growth, Vargas decided signed with Liga Deportiva Alajuelense, since the club was able to afford 100% of his salary and growth opportunities with the club's training camp CAR. While playing for Deportiva Alajuelense, Vargas scored five times in 20 appearances in all competitions. In June 2026, Vargas signed on-loan for Greek Super League club Kalamata.

== International career ==
Capped at under-23 level, Vargas received his first call-up to the Costa Rica senior national team in 2021. In October 2022 he was again called up to the national team set-up but didn't make an appearance from the substitute bench.

In May 2026, Vargas and teammates Alejandro Bran and Warren Madrigal were removed from the Costa Rica squad ahead of a friendly match against England in Florida after being caught up in a violent altercation in which gun shots were fired outside a nightclub in Los Yoses in the Costa Rican capital, San José. Images in the media showed at least five bullets had struck Bran's car.

== Personal life ==
His father, also called Kenneth Vargas and nicknamed “Huevo”, was a professional footballer in Costa Rica who played as a striker. Kenneth Vargas Jnr is subsequently nicknamed “Huevito”.

== Career statistics ==
=== Club ===
As of 26 October 2025

Appearances and goals by club, season and competition
Club	Season	League			National cup		Continental		Other		Total	
Club	Season	Division	Apps	Goals	Apps	Goals	Apps	Goals	Apps	Goals	Apps	Goals
Grecia (loan)	2020–21	Liga FPD	11	2	0	0	—		—		11	2
Grecia (loan)	2021–22	Liga FPD	17	3	0	0	—		—		17	3
Grecia (loan)	Total		28	5	0	0	0	0	0	0	28	5
Herediano	2021–22	Liga FPD	12	2	0	0	—		2 (Note: Appearance in the Liga FPD play-offs)	0	14	2
Herediano	2022–23	Liga FPD	33	10	8	2	3 (Note: Appearances in the CONCACAF League)	0	8	0	52	12
Herediano	2023–24	Liga FPD	0	0	0	0	—		1 (Note: Appearance in the Costa Rican Super Cup)	0	1	0
Herediano	Total		45	12	8	2	3	0	11	0	67	14
Heart of Midlothian (loan)	2023–24	Scottish Premiership	33	6	4	3	2 (Note: Appearances in the UEFA Europa Conference League)	0	3 (Note: Appearances in the Scottish League Cup)	0	42	9
Heart of Midlothian	2024–25	Scottish Premiership	29	4	3	0	8 (Note: Appearances in the UEFA Europa League)	0	1	0	41	4
Herediano	2025–26	Liga FPD	5	0	0	0	0	0	—		5	0
Career total			140	27	14	4	13	0	15	0	182	31

=== International ===
As of match played 18 November 2025

Appearances and goals by national team and year
National team	Year	Apps	Goals
Costa Rica	2023	3	0
Costa Rica	2024	7	1
Costa Rica	2025	11	2
Total		21	3

Scores and results list Costa Rica's goal tally first.

List of international goals scored by Kenneth Vargas
No.	Date	Venue	Opponent	Score	Result	Competition
1	15 October 2024	Estadio Nacional, San José, Costa Rica	Guatemala	2–0	3–0	2024–25 CONCACAF Nations League A
2	21 March 2025	FFB Stadium, Belmopan, Belize	Belize	3–0	7–0	2025 CONCACAF Gold Cup qualification
3	9 September 2025	Estadio Nacional, San José, Costa Rica	Haiti	1–0	3–3	2026 FIFA World Cup qualification
