= James Wilson (footballer, born 2007) =

Scottish association football player (born 2007)

- Wilson in 2026

Personal information
- Full name: James Thomas Wilson
- Date of birth: 6 March 2007 (age 19)
- Place of birth: Edinburgh, Scotland
- Position: Forward

Team information
- Current team: Heart of Midlothian
- Number: 21

Youth career
- –2024: Heart of Midlothian

Senior career*
Years	Team	Apps	(Gls)
2024–	Heart of Midlothian	43	(8)
2026	→ Tottenham Hotspur (loan)	0	(0)

International career^{‡}
2022	Northern Ireland U17	1	(0)
2022–2023	Scotland U16	7	(3)
2023	Scotland U17	4	(2)
2024–	Scotland U19	1	(0)
2025–	Scotland U21	10	(6)
2025–	Scotland	2	(0)
- * Club domestic league appearances and goals as of 22 November 2026 ‡ National team caps and goals as of 15 November 2026

James Thomas Wilson (born 6 March 2007) is a Scottish professional footballer who plays as a forward for Scottish Premiership club Heart of Midlothian. Wilson has represented the Scotland national team, and represented Northern Ireland at under-17 level.

== Early life ==
Wilson grew up in Linlithgow and attended Balerno High School in Edinburgh. His twin brothers Alfie and Stanley also developed at the Hearts academy, and have appeared for the club's B-team in the Lowland League in 2025.

== Club career ==
Wilson signed a first professional contract with Heart of Midlothian in the summer of 2023. He broke through into first team during the 2023–24 season, making three appearances as a substitute, whilst also playing for the Hearts B-team in the Lowland League. He made his professional debut as a 16-year-old in the Scottish Cup on 20 January 2024 in a 2–1 away win against The Spartans. He then made his Scottish Premiership debut against Dundee in May 2024.

He scored his first league goal for Hearts in October 2024 in a 4–0 win over St Mirren; the following week he made headlines with a late equaliser in the Edinburgh derby against Hibernian on 27 October 2024, which finished 1–1.

On 19 December 2024, in a UEFA Conference League game against Petrocub Hîncești, Wilson became the youngest goalscorer in the competition's four-year history, and the all-time youngest scorer for Hearts in any European fixture, at the age of 17 years and 288 days. He subsequently signed a contract extension until the summer of 2026. He was sent off for the first time on 6 April 2025, for a late sliding tackle on Luca Stephenson of Dundee United.

On 2 February 2026, Wilson joined English Premier League side Tottenham Hotspur on a six-month loan deal. Initially joining up with their under-21 side, the deal included an option to buy at the end of the season.

Having returned from his loan spell at Tottenham Hotspur, Wilson scored his first goal in a year for Hearts in a 6–2 win over Inverness Caledonian Thistle in August 2026. Later in the week, he scored a long-range goal against Rapid Vienna, helping Hearts to draw 2–2 with the Austrian club in the 2026–27 UEFA Conference League; Hearts ultimately qualified for the competition.

== International career ==
Having come on as a substitute against the Faroe Islands for the Northern Ireland under-17s in 2022 (being eligible at that stage, as well as for England and the Republic of Ireland, through his parents), Wilson went on to captain Scotland at under-16 and under-17 levels.

In March 2025 he received his first call up for the senior Scotland squad for the UEFA Nations League play-off against Greece; He made his full international debut in the second leg of the tie, becoming the youngest man to play for Scotland at the age of 18 years, 17 days (surpassing the record set by John Lambie which had stood for 138 years). Wilson was one of four young players invited to train with the Scotland squad ahead of the 2026 World Cup finals.

== Career statistics ==
=== Club ===
As of 22 November 2026

Appearances and goals by club, season and competition
Club	Season	League			National cup (Note: Includes Scottish FA Cup)		League cup (Note: Includes Scottish League Cup)		Europe		Total	
Club	Season	Division	Apps	Goals	Apps	Goals	Apps	Goals	Apps	Goals	Apps	Goals
Heart of Midlothian	2023–24	Scottish Premiership	2	0	1	0	0	0	0	0	3	0
Heart of Midlothian	2024–25	Scottish Premiership	24	5	4	0	0	0	4 (Note: One appearance in UEFA Europa League, three appearances and one goal in UEFA Conference League)	1	32	6
Heart of Midlothian	2025–26	Scottish Premiership	6	0	0	0	4	2	—		10	2
Heart of Midlothian	2026–27	Scottish Premiership	11	3	0	0	2	1	6	1	19	5
Heart of Midlothian	Total		43	8	5	0	6	3	10	2	64	13
Tottenham Hotspur (loan)	2025–26	Premier League	0	0	—		—		0	0	0	0
Career total			43	8	5	0	6	3	10	2	64	13
