= Jorge Grant =

English footballer (born 1994)

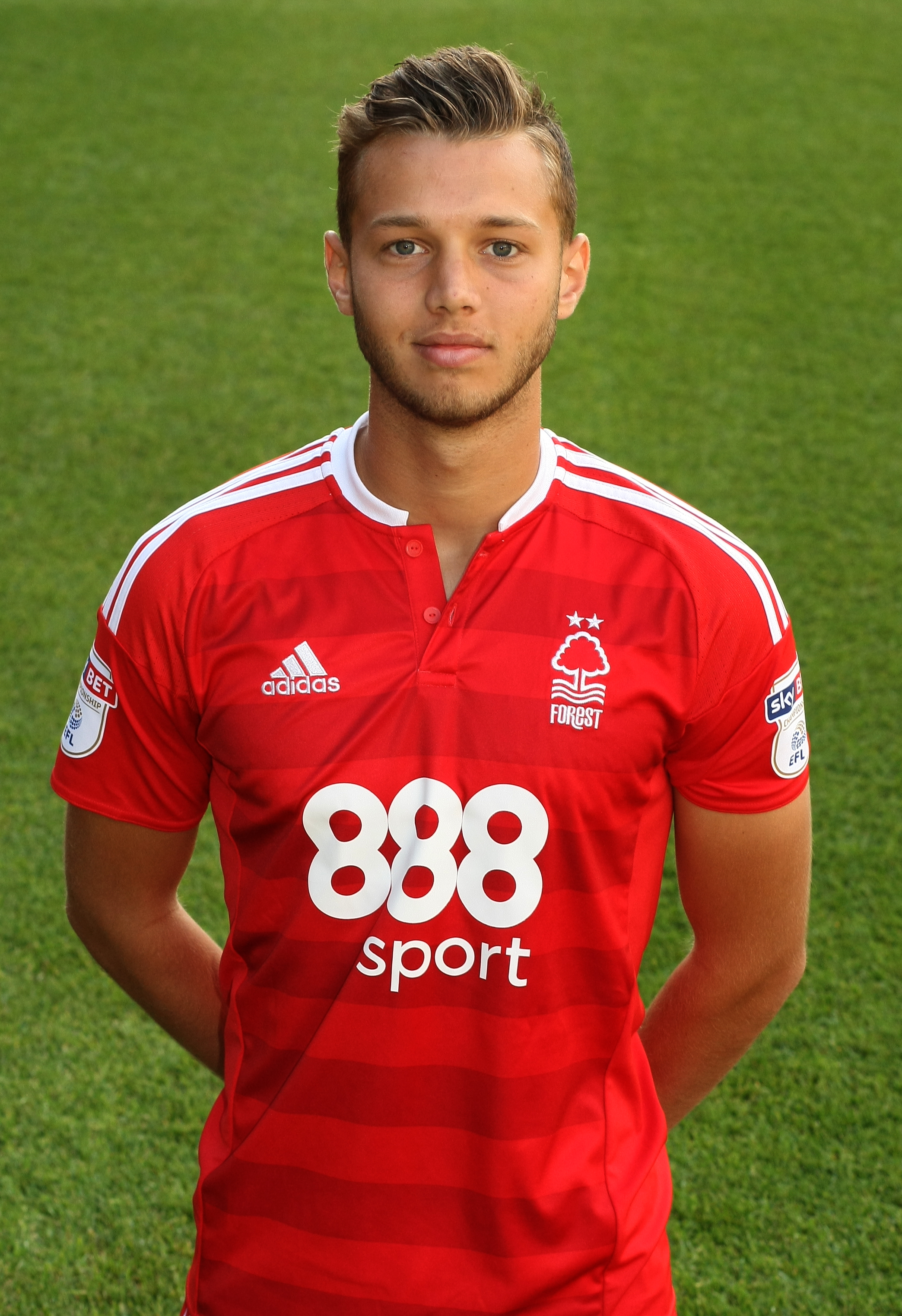
- Grant with Nottingham Forest in 2016

Personal information
- Full name: Jorge Edward Grant
- Date of birth: 19 December 1994 (age 31)
- Place of birth: Banbury, England
- Height: 5 ft 9 in (1.75 m)
- Position: Midfielder

Team information
- Current team: Salford City
- Number: 8

Youth career
- –2012: Reading
- 2012–2013: Nike Academy
- 2013–2014: Nottingham Forest

Senior career*
Years	Team	Apps	(Gls)
2014–2019	Nottingham Forest	17	(0)
2017	→ Notts County (loan)	17	(6)
2017–2018	→ Notts County (loan)	45	(15)
2018–2019	→ Luton Town (loan)	17	(2)
2019	→ Mansfield Town (loan)	17	(4)
2019–2021	Lincoln City	68	(15)
2021–2022	Peterborough United	26	(2)
2022–2025	Heart of Midlothian	84	(9)
2025–	Salford City	52	(6)
- * Club domestic league appearances and goals as of 18 October 2026 (UTC)

Jorge Edward Grant (born 19 December 1994) is an English professional footballer who plays as a midfielder for EFL League Two club Salford City.

== Club career ==
=== Nottingham Forest ===
After spending time at the Nike Academy, Grant moved to Nottingham Forest's academy, where he played for two years before joining the first-team squad. Grant made his professional debut on 12 August 2014 as an 87th-minute substitute in a 1–0 win over Tranmere Rovers. On 25 September, Grant started Forest's third and final League Cup game of the 2014–15 season away at Spurs, and scored his first goal in professional football with a close-range finish in the 61st minute. Forest ultimately lost this game 3–1.

=== Notts County (loan) ===
On 31 January 2017 Grant joined Forest's neighbours Notts County on loan for the remainder of the season, having featured for the Reds in an Under-23 match against the Notts' counterparts earlier that day. After completing the signing, Magpies manager Kevin Nolan described Grant as a player with "brilliant technical ability (who) will add creativity and flair". In Grant's second game for the club he scored a 93rd-minute equaliser in a 2–2 draw at home to Exeter City. After a successful spell at County, in which he starred with six goals in seventeen games to help the club avoid relegation from League Two, Grant signed a three-year deal with Forest on 12 June to extend his stay until 2020. After signing the deal, Grant told iFollow Forest that he was targeting a starting position in Forest's first-team ahead of the new season.

Grant re-signed on loan with Notts County on 20 July 2017, joining the club for the 2017–18 season.

=== Luton Town (loan) ===
On 6 July 2018, it was announced that Grant would join Luton Town on loan for their 2018–19 season. The loan was terminated early on 7 January 2019 after making 22 appearances and scoring four goals for Luton.

=== Mansfield Town (loan) ===
On 14 January 2019, Grant joined Mansfield Town on loan until the end of the season.

=== Lincoln City ===
On 5 July 2019, Grant signed for Lincoln City for an undisclosed fee. He signed a new two-and-a-half-year contract on 29 January 2021, keeping him at the club until the summer of 2023. His form was not unnoticed as he made the League One Team of the Season for the 2020-21 season. In June 2021, it was revealed that the contract which he signed in January had a buyout clause to any Championship side and that a deal for his sale was 'imminent' according to Lincoln CEO, Liam Scully. Jorge still regrets leaving Lincoln and says it's the worse decision he's made in his career.

=== Peterborough United ===
On 29 June 2021, Grant completed a move to Championship side Peterborough United for an undisclosed fee, signing a three-year deal.

On 18 September 2021, Grant scored his first goal for Peterborough United in a 3–0 win over Birmingham City.

=== Heart of Midlothian ===
On 27 June 2022, Grant joined Heart of Midlothian for an undisclosed fee, signing a three-year deal. On 14 August 2022, he scored his first goal for the club in a 4–1 victory over Dundee United. He left Hearts at the expiry of his contract in June 2025.

=== Salford City ===
On 10 July 2025, Grant joined EFL League Two club Salford City on a two-year contract.

== Career statistics ==
As of 19 May 2025

Appearances and goals by club, season and competition
Club	Season	League			National cup (Note: Includes FA Cup, Scottish Cup)		League cup (Note: Includes EFL Cup, Scottish League Cup)		Continental		Other		Total	
Club	Season	Division	Apps	Goals	Apps	Goals	Apps	Goals	Apps	Goals	Apps	Goals	Apps	Goals
Nottingham Forest	2014–15	Championship	1	0	0	0	2	1	—		—		3	1
Nottingham Forest	2015–16	Championship	10	0	1	0	0	0	—		—		11	0
Nottingham Forest	2016–17	Championship	6	0	0	0	0	0	—		—		6	0
Nottingham Forest	2017–18	Championship	0	0	—		—		—		—		0	0
Nottingham Forest	2018–19	Championship	0	0	—		—		—		—		0	0
Nottingham Forest	Total		17	0	1	0	2	1	—		—		20	1
Notts County (loan)	2016–17	League Two	17	6	—		—		—		—		17	6
Notts County (loan)	2017–18	League Two	45	15	5	2	1	1	—		5 (Note: Three appearances in EFL Trophy, two appearances and one goal in League Two play-offs)	1	56	19
Notts County (loan)	Total		62	21	5	2	1	1	—		5	1	73	25
Luton Town (loan)	2018–19	League One	17	2	1	0	0	0	—		4 (Note: Appearances in EFL Trophy)	2	22	4
Mansfield Town (loan)	2018–19	League Two	17	4	—		—		—		1 (Note: Appearance in League Two play-offs)	0	18	4
Lincoln City	2019–20	League One	32	2	2	0	1	0	—		3	0	38	2
Lincoln City	2020–21	League One	36	13	2	2	3	0	—		10 (Note: Seven appearances and two goals in EFL Trophy, one appearance in League One play-offs)	2	51	17
Lincoln City	Total		68	15	4	2	4	0	—		13	2	89	19
Peterborough United	2021–22	Championship	26	2	2	0	1	0	—		0	0	29	2
Peterborough United	Total		26	2	2	0	1	0	—		0	0	29	2
Heart of Midlothian	2022–23	Scottish Premiership	28	2	3	0	0	0	7 (Note: Two appearances in UEFA Europa League play-offs, five appearances in UEFA Conference League)	0	—		38	1
Heart of Midlothian	2023–24	Scottish Premiership	26	4	4	0	1	0	1 (Note: Appearance in UEFA Conference League)	0	—		32	4
Heart of Midlothian	2024–25	Scottish Premiership	30	3	3	0	1	0	6 (Note: Two appearances in UEFA Europa League play-offs, four appearances in UEFA Conference League)	0	—		40	3
Heart of Midlothian	Total		84	9	10	0	2	0	14	0	0	0	110	9
Salford City	2025–26	League Two	0	0	0	0	0	0	—		0	0	0	0
Career total			291	52	23	4	10	2	14	0	23	5	344	63

== Honours ==
Luton Town

- EFL League One: 2018–19

Individual

- PFA Team of the Year: 2017–18 League Two
- PFA Team of the Year: 2020–21 League One
- EFL League Two Team of the Season: 2020–21
