= Gerald Taylor (footballer) =

Costa Rican association football player

Personal information
- Full name: Gerald Gisjiel Taylor Dosman
- Date of birth: 28 May 2001 (age 25)
- Height: 1.82 m (6 ft 0 in)
- Position: Right-back

Team information
- Current team: Deportivo Saprissa
- Number: 17

Senior career*
Years	Team	Apps	(Gls)
2021–2022	Uruguay de Coronado	15	(0)
2022–	Deportivo Saprissa	133	(3)
2024–2025	→ Heart of Midlothian (loan)	8	(0)

International career^{‡}
2023	Costa Rica U21	9	(2)
2023	Costa Rica U22	5	(0)
2023–	Costa Rica U23	6	(10)
2023–	Costa Rica	11	(1)
- * Club domestic league appearances and goals as of 19 September 2026 ‡ National team caps and goals as of 24 September 2026

Gerald Gisjiel Taylor Dosman (born 28 May 2001) is a Costa Rican footballer who plays as a right-back for Liga FPD club Deportivo Saprissa and the Costa Rica national team. He has previously played for Uruguay de Coronado and Heart of Midlothian.

He has also represented Costa Rica, at the 2024 Copa América.

== Club career ==
=== Early career ===
From Manzanillo, Limón, in the south-east of Costa Rica, Taylor started his career playing for C.S. Uruguay de Coronado in the Segunda División de Costa Rica before progressing his career at Deportivo Saprissa. He signed a new deal with the club in March 2022, keeping him under contract until June 2026. He scored his first league goal for Deportivo Saprissa in November 2023 against Pérez Zeledón.

He scored his first goal in the CONCACAF Champions Cup for Saprissa against Philadelphia Union in February 2024.

=== Hearts ===
On 10 July 2024, Taylor signed for Scottish Premiership side Heart of Midlothian (Hearts) on a season-long loan deal.

== Style of play ==
Known as a versatile player, he started his career playing centrally but developed his career at Deportivo Saprissa playing at right-back. He can also play in midfield.

== International career ==
He made his debut for the senior Costa Rica on 25 March 2023 against Martinique national football team in the CONCACAF Nations League. He scored his first goal for the senior Costa Rica team against Grenada in June 2024.

== Career statistics ==
=== International ===
As of match played 24 September 2026

Appearances and goals by national team and year
National team	Year	Apps	Goals
Costa Rica	2023	1	0
Costa Rica	2024	7	1
Costa Rica	2025	1	0
Costa Rica	2026	2	0
Total		11	1

Scores and results list Costa Rica's goal tally first, score column indicates score after each Taylor goal.

List of international goals scored by Gerald Taylor
No.	Date	Venue	Opponent	Score	Result	Competition
1	8 June 2024	Kirani James Athletic Stadium, St. George's, Grenada	Grenada	3–0	3–0	2026 FIFA World Cup qualifying
