= 2022–23 Heart of Midlothian F.C. season =

Heart of Midlothian
2022–23 season
- Chairman: Ann Budge
- Manager: Robbie Neilson (until 9 April); Steven Naismith (Interim from 10 April)
- Stadium: Tynecastle Park
- Premiership: 4th
- Scottish Cup: Quarter-finals
- League Cup: Second round
- Europa League: Play-off round
- Europa Conference League: Group stage
- Top goalscorer: League: Lawrence Shankland (24); All: Lawrence Shankland (28)
- Highest home attendance: 18,980 v. Hibernian; Premiership; 2 January 2023
- Lowest home attendance: 11,071 v. Kilmarnock; League Cup; 31 August 2022
- Average home league attendance: 18,471
| Home colours | Away colours | Third colours |

The 2022–23 season was the 142nd season of competitive football by Heart of Midlothian. It was the club's second season of play back in the top tier of Scottish football.

In addition to the domestic league, Hearts also competed in the Scottish Cup, the Scottish League Cup, the Europa League, and the Europa Conference League.

== Results and fixtures ==
Win Draw Loss Postponed

=== Pre-season / Friendlies ===
| 30 June 2022 Friendly | Heart of Midlothian | 4–0 | Europa | La Cala Resort |
| 16:00 | Mackay-Steven 8'; Forrest 50', 76'; Henderson 72' | Match Report |

| 5 July 2022 Friendly | East Fife | 0–7 | Heart of Midlothian | Bayview Stadium |
| 19:00 | | Match Report | Cochrane 14'; Pollock 20'; Trialist 33'; Kingsley 50', 55', 62' (pen.); Forrest 64' |

| 6 July 2022 Friendly | The Spartans | 0–1 | Heart of Midlothian | Ainslie Park |
| 19:45 | | Match Report | Henderson 10' | Attendance: 1,021 |

| 9 July 2022 Friendly | Heart of Midlothian | 5–0 | Bonnyrigg Rose | Tynecastle Park |
| 15:00 | Grant 41'; Haring 65' (pen.); Boyce 78'; McEneff 82'; Henderson 89' | Match Report |

| 13 July 2022 Friendly | Tranmere Rovers | 1–2 | Heart of Midlothian | Prenton Park |
| 19:30 | Hemmings 10' | Match Report | McKay 70'; Boyce 74' |

| 16 July 2022 Friendly | Heart of Midlothian | 2–2 | Crawley Town | Tynecastle Park |
| 13:00 | Kingsley 8', 17' | Match Report | Telford 49', 51' |

| 20 July 2022 Friendly | Preston North End | 2–1 | Heart of Midlothian | Deepdale |
| 19:45 | Woodburn 34'; Browne 75' | Match Report | Haring 65' (pen.) |

| 23 July 2022 Friendly | Heart of Midlothian | 2–1 | Stoke City | Tynecastle Park |
| 15:00 | Shankland 43', 87' | Match Report | Campbell 89' |
Note: Testimonial for Gary Locke.

=== Scottish Premiership ===
| 30 July 2022 1 | Heart of Midlothian | 2–1 | Ross County | Tynecastle Park |
| 15:00 | Forrest 59'; McKay 77' | BBC Report | White 79' | Attendance: 18,202; Referee: Dickinson |

| 7 August 2022 2 | Hibernian | 1–1 | Heart of Midlothian | Easter Road |
| 12:00 | Boyle 90+5' | BBC Report | Shankland 22' | Attendance: 20,179; Referee: Beaton |

| 14 August 2022 3 | Heart of Midlothian | 4–1 | Dundee United | Tynecastle Park |
| 15:00 | Shankland 1'; McKay 48'; Grant 62'; Ginnelly 90+5' | BBC Report | Fletcher 71' (pen.) | Attendance: 18,856; Referee: Steven |

| 21 August 2022 4 | Celtic | 2–0 | Heart of Midlothian | Celtic Park |
| 15:00 | Kyogo 13'; Giakoumakis 90+4' | BBC Report | Cochrane (yellow card) 62' (yellow-red card) 89'; Sibbick (yellow card) 55' (yellow-red card) 90+1' | Attendance: 58,776; Referee: Clancy |

| 28 August 2022 5 | Heart of Midlothian | 3–2 | St Johnstone | Tynecastle Park |
| 15:00 | Rowles 25'; Boyce 31'; Shankland 81' (pen.) | BBC Report | Carey 6'; Considine 54' | Attendance: 18,353; Referee: Beaton |

| 3 September 2022 6 | Livingston | 1–0 | Heart of Midlothian | Tony Macaroni Arena |
| 15:00 | Montaño | BBC Report | | Attendance: 4,678; Referee: Collum |

| 18 September 2022 8 | Motherwell | 0–3 | Heart of Midlothian | Fir Park Stadium |
| 15:00 | | BBC Report | Shankland 17'; Forrest 50', 90' | Attendance: 6,546; Referee: Walsh |

| 1 October 2022 9 | Heart of Midlothian | 0–4 | Rangers | Tynecastle Park |
| 12:30 | Devlin (red card) 39' | Report | Čolak 6', 30'; Morelos 76'; Kent 90+1' | Attendance: 18,433; Referee: Steven McLean |

| 8 October 2022 10 | Kilmarnock | 2–2 | Heart of Midlothian | Rugby Park |
| 15:00 | Stokes 47'; Lafferty 59' | Report | Humphrys 62'; Atkinson 90+4' | Attendance: 6,651; Referee: Matthew MacDermid |

| 15 October 2022 11 | Aberdeen | 2–0 | Heart of Midlothian | Pittodrie |
| 15:00 | Duk 74'; Besuijen 79' | Report | | Attendance: 14,711; Referee: Don Robertson |

| 22 October 2022 12 | Heart of Midlothian | 3–4 | Celtic | Tynecastle Park |
| 12:30 | Shankland 45+3' (pen.), 47', 65' (pen.) | Report | Forrest 14'; Giakoumakis 55'; Maeda 59'; Taylor 76' | Attendance: 18,081; Referee: Nick Walsh |

| 29 October 2022 13 | Ross County | 1–2 | Heart of Midlothian | Victoria Park |
| 15:00 | White 11' | Report | Shankland 15'; Halliday 20' | Attendance: 4,438; Referee: David Dickinson |

| 5 November 2022 14 | Heart of Midlothian | 3–2 | Motherwell | Tynecastle Park |
| 15:00 | Grant (red card) 38'; Halliday 45', 47'; Shankland 89' (pen.) | BBC Report | Moult 61' (pen.); Spittal 79' | Attendance: 18,806; Referee: Clancy |

| 9 November 2022 15 | Rangers | 1–0 | Heart of Midlothian | Ibrox Stadium |
| 19:45 | Tillman 66' | BBC Report | | Attendance: 48,376; Referee: Beaton |

| 12 November 2022 16 | Heart of Midlothian | 1–1 | Livingston | Tynecastle Park |
| 15:00 | Rowles (red card) 75'; Ginnelly 90+7' | BBC Report | Kelly 55' | Attendance: 18,448; Referee: Craig Napier |

| 17 December 2022 17 | Heart of Midlothian | 3–1 | Kilmarnock | Tynecastle Park |
| 15:00 | Ginnelly 19'; Shankland 29', 88' (pen.) | BBC Report | Taylor 73' | Attendance: 18,645; Referee: William Collum |

| 24 December 2022 18 | Dundee United | 2–2 | Heart of Midlothian | Tannadice |
| 15:00 | Fletcher 20'; Levitt 47' | BBC Report | Smith 41'; Shankland 90+4' | Attendance: 10,224; Referee: Colin Steven |

| 28 December 2022 19 | St Johnstone | 2–3 | Heart of Midlothian | McDiarmid Park |
| 19:45 | May 55' (pen.); Murphy 79' | BBC Report | Shankland 14' (pen.); Forrest 33'; McKay 64' | Attendance: 7,058; Referee: William Collum |

| 2 January 2023 20 | Heart of Midlothian | 3–0 | Hibernian | Tynecastle Park |
| 15:00 | Shankland 8', 38' (Penalty Kick); Humphrys 90+4' | BBC Report | | Attendance: 18,980; Referee: Clancy |

| 7 January 2023 21 | St Mirren | 1–1 | Heart of Midlothian | St Mirren Park |
| 15:00 | Strain 4'; Fraser (red card) 90+5' | BBC Report | Snodgrass 49' | Attendance: 7,249; Referee: Chris Graham |

| 13 January 2023 7 | Heart of Midlothian | 1–0 | St Mirren | Tynecastle Park |
| 19:45 | McKay 29' | BBC Report | | Attendance: 18,721; Referee: David Munro |

| 18 January 2023 22 | Heart of Midlothian | 5–0 | Aberdeen | Tynecastle Park |
| 19:45 | Shinnie 15' (o.g.); Smith 28'; Shankland 40' (pen.); Ginnelly 45+1'; Devlin 61' | BBC Report | | Attendance: 18,497; Referee: William Collum |

| 29 January 2023 24 | Livingston | 0–0 | Heart of Midlothian | Tony Macaroni Arena |
| 13:30 | | BBC Report | | Attendance: 6,393; Referee: Alan Muir |

| 1 February 2023 24 | Heart of Midlothian | 0–3 | Rangers | Tynecastle Park |
| 19:45 | | BBC Report | Morelos 9', 67'; Tillman 34' | Attendance: 18,330; Referee: John Beaton |

| 4 February 2023 25 | Heart of Midlothian | 3–1 | Dundee United | Tynecastle Park |
| 15:00 | Shankland 71'; Cochrane 77'; Ginnelly (red card) 90+6'; Humphrys 90+8' | BBC Report | Fletcher 9'; Edwards (red card) 29' | Attendance: 18,279; Referee: Nick Walsh |

| 19 February 2023 26 | Motherwell | 2–0 | Heart of Midlothian | Fir Park Stadium |
| 15:00 | Obika 40'; Spittal 46' | BBC Report | | Attendance: 6,450; Referee: Don Robertson |

| 4 March 2023 28 | Heart of Midlothian | 3–0 | St Johnstone | Tynecastle Park |
| 15:00 | Ginnelly 21', 63'; Grant 73' | BBC Report | | Attendance: 18,596; Referee: Steven McLean |

| 8 March 2023 27 | Celtic | 3–1 | Heart of Midlothian | Celtic Park |
| 19:45 | Maeda 25'; Furuhashi 60'; Hakšabanović 84' | BBC Report | Ginnelly 6' | Attendance: 58,951; Referee: Alan Muir |

| 18 March 2023 29 | Aberdeen | 3–0 | Heart of Midlothian | Pittodrie |
| 15:00 | Duk 5', 21'; Pollock 28' | BBC Report | | Attendance: 16,278; Referee: David Dickinson |

| 1 April 2023 30 | Kilmarnock | 2–1 | Heart of Midlothian | Rugby Park |
| 15:00 | Armstrong 22' (pen.); Doidge 45'; McKenzie (red card) 60' | BBC Report | Shankland 7' | Attendance: 7,237; Referee: Euan Anderson |

| 8 April 2023 31 | Heart of Midlothian | 0–2 | St Mirren | Tynecastle Park |
| 15:00 | Snodgrass (red card) 62' | BBC Report | Main 52'; Gogić 57' | Attendance: 18,660; Referee: Matthew MacDermid |

| 15 April 2023 32 | Hibernian | 1–0 | Heart of Midlothian | Easter Road |
| 12:30 | Nisbet 67' | BBC Report | | Attendance: 20,132; Referee: John Beaton |

| 22 April 2023 33 | Heart of Midlothian | 6–1 | Ross County | Tynecastle Park |
| 12:30 | Cochrane 17'; Ginnelly 22', 56'; Shankland 28', 45+7' (pen.), 59' | BBC Report | Edwards 85' (pen.) | Attendance: 18,316; Referee: Don Robertson |

| 7 May 2023 34 | Heart of Midlothian | 0–2 | Celtic | Tynecastle Park |
| 14:15 | Cochrane (red card) 45' | BBC Report | Furuhashi 67'; Oh 80' | Attendance: 18,143; Referee: Nick Walsh |

| 13 May 2023 35 | St Mirren | 2–2 | Heart of Midlothian | St Mirren Park |
| 15:00 | Shaughnessy 36'; Strain 45+4' | BBC Report | Ginnelly 73'; Haring (red card) 77'; Shankland 90+6' (pen.) | Attendance: 7,238; Referee: David Dickinson |

| 20 May 2023 36 | Heart of Midlothian | 2–1 | Aberdeen | Tynecastle Park |
| 12:30 | Ginnelly 43'; Shankland 56' | BBC Report | Pollock 31' | Attendance: 18,661; Referee: Kevin Clancy |

| 24 May 2023 37 | Rangers | 2–2 | Heart of Midlothian | Ibrox Stadium |
| 19:45 | Cantwell 45+4'; Sakala 47' | BBC Report | Shankland 1'; Kuol 90+4' | Attendance: 48,428; Referee: John Beaton |

| 27 May 2023 38 | Heart of Midlothian | 1–1 | Hibernian | Tynecastle Park |
| 12:30 | Oda 8'; Cochrane (red card) 29' | BBC Report | Nisbet 31' | Referee: Robertson |

=== Scottish Cup ===
| 22 January 2023 Fourth round | Hibernian | 0–3 | Heart of Midlothian | Easter Road |
| 14:00 | | BBC Report | Ginnelly 10'; Shankland 72'; Shankland (yellow card) 90+1' (yellow-red card); Sibbick 90+6' | Attendance: 18,622; Referee: Robertson |

| 10 February 2023 Fifth round | Hamilton Academical | 0–2 | Heart of Midlothian | New Douglas Park |
| 19:45 | | BBC Report | Humphrys 29'; Devlin 79' | Attendance: 4,731; Referee: Clancy |

| 11 March 2023 Quarter-final | Heart of Midlothian | 0–3 | Celtic | Tynecastle Park |
| 12:15 | | Report | Mooy 2'; Furuhashi 45'; Carter-Vickers 80' | Attendance: 16,287; Referee: Kevin Clancy |

=== Scottish League Cup ===
| 31 August 2022 Second round | Heart of Midlothian | 0–1 | Kilmarnock | Tynecastle Park |
| 19:45 | | BBC Report | Cameron 21' | Attendance: 11,071; Referee: Robertson |

=== UEFA Europa League ===
==== Play-off round ====
| 18 August 2022 First leg | (Switzerland) Zürich | 2–1 | Heart of Midlothian | Kybunpark (Note: Zürich will play their play-off round home match at Kybunpark in St. Gallen, instead of their regular stadium, Letzigrund, in Zürich, which is hosting a concert.) |
| 18:00 BST (UTC+1) | Guerrero 32'; Džemaili 34' | BBC Report | Shankland 22' (pen.) | Attendance: 7,958; Referee: Frankowski (Poland) |

| 25 August 2022 Second leg | Heart of Midlothian | 0–1 (1–3 agg.) | (Switzerland) Zürich | Tynecastle Park |
| 20:00 BST (UTC+1) | Grant (yellow card) 18' (yellow-red card) 54' | BBC Report | Rohner 80' | Attendance: 17,225; Referee: Visser (Belgium) |

=== UEFA Europa Conference League ===
==== Group stage ====
| 8 September 2022 1 | Heart of Midlothian | 0–4 | (Turkey) İstanbul Başakşehir | Tynecastle Park |
| 17:45 BST (UTC+1) | | BBC Report | Kaldırım 26'; Ndayishimiye 67'; Okaka 75'; Özcan 82' | Attendance: 15,131; Referee: Jakubik (Poland) |

| 15 September 2022 2 | (Latvia) RFS | 0–2 | Heart of Midlothian | Skonto Stadium (Note: RFS play their home matches in European competition at Skonto Stadium, instead of their regular stadium, LNK Sporta Parks, which does not meet UEFA requirements) |
| 20:00 BST (UTC+1) | | BBC Report | Shankland 43' (pen.); Forrest 90+3' | Attendance: 6,747; Referee: Stavrev (Macedonia) |

| 6 October 2022 3 | Heart of Midlothian | 0–3 | (Italy) Fiorentina | Tynecastle Park |
| 20:00 BST (UTC+1) | Neilson (red card) 48' | BBC Report | Mandragora 4'; Kouamé 42'; Jović 79' | Attendance: 17,243; Referee: Lambrechts (Belgium) |

| 13 October 2022 4 | (Italy) Fiorentina | 5–1 | Heart of Midlothian | Stadio Artemio Franchi |
| 17:45 BST (UTC+1) | Jović 5'; Biraghi 22'; González 31', 79' (pen.); Barák 38' | BBC Report | Humphrys 47' | Attendance: 18,576; Referee: Bebek (Croatia) |

| 27 October 2022 5 | Heart of Midlothian | 2–1 | (Latvia) RFS | Tynecastle Park |
| 20:00 BST (UTC+1) | Shankland 3'; Halliday 12' | BBC Report | Friesenbichler 39'; Jagodinskis (red card) 90+3' | Attendance: 15,863; Referee: van Driessche (Belgium) |

| 3 November 2022 6 | (Turkey) İstanbul Başakşehir | 3–1 | Heart of Midlothian | Fatih Terim Stadium |
| 15:30 GMT (UTC+0) | Ndayishimiye 4'; Gürler 33'; Özcan 64' | BBC Report | Atkinson 90' | Attendance: 4,824; Referee: Kikacheishvili (Georgia) |

== First team player statistics ==
=== Squad information ===
During the 2022–23 campaign, Hearts have used thirty players in competitive games. The table below shows the number of appearances and goals scored by each player.

| Number | Position | Nation | Name | Totals | | Premiership | | Europe | | League Cup | | Scottish Cup | |
| Number | Position | Nation | Name | Apps | Goals | Apps | Goals | Apps | Goals | Apps | Goals | Apps | Goals |
|---|---|---|---|---|---|---|---|---|---|---|---|---|---|
| 1 | GK | (Scotland) SCO | Craig Gordon | 23 | 0 | 14+0 | 0 | 8+0 | 0 | 1+0 | 0 | 0+0 | 0 |
| 2 | DF | (Northern Ireland) NIR | Michael Smith | 38 | 2 | 21+5 | 2 | 6+2 | 0 | 1+0 | 0 | 3+0 | 0 |
| 3 | DF | (Scotland) SCO | Stephen Kingsley | 31 | 0 | 16+5 | 0 | 7+0 | 0 | 0+0 | 0 | 2+1 | 0 |
| 4 | DF | (Scotland) SCO | Craig Halkett | 8 | 0 | 5+1 | 0 | 2+0 | 0 | 0+0 | 0 | 0+0 | 0 |
| 5 | DF | (Austria) AUT | Peter Haring | 21 | 0 | 10+6 | 0 | 3+1 | 0 | 1+0 | 0 | 0+0 | 0 |
| 6 | MF | (Democratic Republic of the Congo) COD | Beni Baningime | 0 | 0 | 0+0 | 0 | 0+0 | 0 | 0+0 | 0 | 0+0 | 0 |
| 7 | MF | (England) ENG | Jorge Grant | 36 | 2 | 9+17 | 2 | 7+0 | 0 | 0+0 | 0 | 2+1 | 0 |
| 8 | MF | (Germany) GER | Orestis Kiomourtzoglou | 26 | 0 | 11+11 | 0 | 2+1 | 0 | 0+0 | 0 | 1+0 | 0 |
| 9 | FW | (Scotland) SCO | Lawrence Shankland | 45 | 28 | 31+4 | 24 | 6+2 | 3 | 1+0 | 0 | 1+0 | 1 |
| 10 | FW | (Northern Ireland) NIR | Liam Boyce | 7 | 1 | 4+1 | 1 | 1+1 | 0 | 0+0 | 0 | 0+0 | 0 |
| 11 | MF | (Scotland) SCO | Gary Mackay-Steven | 6 | 0 | 3+1 | 0 | 0+1 | 0 | 0+1 | 0 | 0+0 | 0 |
| 12 | DF | (Australia) AUS | Nathaniel Atkinson | 23 | 2 | 10+6 | 1 | 3+1 | 1 | 0+0 | 0 | 0+3 | 0 |
| 13 | GK | (Scotland) SCO | Ross Stewart | 3 | 0 | 2+1 | 0 | 0+0 | 0 | 0+0 | 0 | 0+0 | 0 |
| 14 | MF | (Australia) AUS | Cameron Devlin | 39 | 2 | 24+4 | 1 | 6+1 | 0 | 1+0 | 0 | 1+2 | 1 |
| 15 | DF | (Australia) AUS | Kye Rowles | 31 | 1 | 26+1 | 1 | 2+0 | 0 | 0+0 | 0 | 2+0 | 0 |
| 16 | MF | (Scotland) SCO | Andy Halliday | 34 | 4 | 17+9 | 3 | 5+1 | 1 | 1+0 | 0 | 1+0 | 0 |
| 17 | MF | (Scotland) SCO | Alan Forrest | 46 | 5 | 17+18 | 4 | 4+4 | 1 | 0+0 | 0 | 0+3 | 0 |
| 18 | MF | (Scotland) SCO | Barrie McKay | 47 | 4 | 28+7 | 4 | 7+1 | 0 | 1+0 | 0 | 3+0 | 0 |
| 19 | DF | (England) ENG | Alex Cochrane | 44 | 2 | 28+4 | 2 | 8+0 | 0 | 1+0 | 0 | 2+1 | 0 |
| 20 | DF | (Scotland) SCO | Lewis Neilson | 15 | 0 | 4+5 | 0 | 2+3 | 0 | 1+0 | 0 | 0+0 | 0 |
| 21 | DF | (England) ENG | Toby Sibbick | 38 | 1 | 25+5 | 0 | 2+2 | 0 | 0+1 | 0 | 3+0 | 1 |
| 22 | FW | (Scotland) SCO | Euan Henderson | 7 | 0 | 0+2 | 0 | 1+3 | 0 | 0+1 | 0 | 0+0 | 0 |
| 23 | GK | (Scotland) SCO | Harry Stone | 0 | 0 | 0+0 | 0 | 0+0 | 0 | 0+0 | 0 | 0+0 | 0 |
| 24 | MF | (Scotland) SCO | Scott McGill | 0 | 0 | 0+0 | 0 | 0+0 | 0 | 0+0 | 0 | 0+0 | 0 |
| 25 | DF | (Scotland) SCO | Cammy Logan | 0 | 0 | 0+0 | 0 | 0+0 | 0 | 0+0 | 0 | 0+0 | 0 |
| 27 | MF | (Scotland) SCO | Connor Smith | 11 | 0 | 1+6 | 0 | 1+2 | 0 | 0+1 | 0 | 0+0 | 0 |
| 28 | GK | (Scotland) SCO | Zander Clark | 24 | 0 | 20+1 | 0 | 0+0 | 0 | 0+0 | 0 | 3+0 | 0 |
| 29 | FW | (England) ENG | Stephen Humphrys | 25 | 5 | 7+12 | 3 | 1+3 | 1 | 0+0 | 0 | 1+1 | 1 |
| 30 | MF | (England) ENG | Josh Ginnelly | 38 | 12 | 24+4 | 11 | 3+3 | 0 | 1+0 | 0 | 3+0 | 1 |
| 38 | MF | (Scotland) SCO | Finlay Pollock | 1 | 0 | 0+0 | 0 | 0+1 | 0 | 0+0 | 0 | 0+0 | 0 |
| 61 | FW | (Australia) AUS | Garang Kuol | 9 | 1 | 1+7 | 1 | 0+0 | 0 | 0+0 | 0 | 0+1 | 0 |
| 72 | DF | (England) ENG | James Hill | 17 | 0 | 13+1 | 0 | 0+0 | 0 | 0+0 | 0 | 3+0 | 0 |
| 77 | MF | (Scotland) SCO | Robert Snodgrass | 22 | 1 | 18+2 | 1 | 0+0 | 0 | 0+0 | 0 | 2+0 | 0 |
| 88 | FW | (Japan) JPN | Yutaro Oda | 13 | 1 | 7+5 | 1 | 0+0 | 0 | 0+0 | 0 | 0+1 | 0 |

- Last updated: 27 May 2023
- Source: Match Reports
- Ordered by Squad Number.

Appearances (starts and substitute appearances) and goals include those in the Scottish Premiership, European Competitions, League Cup and the Scottish Cup.

=== Disciplinary record ===
During the 2022–23 season, Hearts players have so far been issued fifty-five yellow cards and seven red cards. The table below shows the number of cards and type shown to each player.

Last updated 27 May 2023

| Number | Position | Nation | Name | Premiership | | League Cup | | Scottish Cup | | Europe | | Total | |
| Number | Position | Nation | Name | Booked | Sent off (straight red) | Booked | Sent off (straight red) | Booked | Sent off (straight red) | Booked | Sent off (straight red) | Booked | Sent off (straight red) |
|---|---|---|---|---|---|---|---|---|---|---|---|---|---|
| 1 | GK | (Scotland) | Craig Gordon | 0 | 0 | 0 | 0 | 0 | 0 | 1 | 0 | 1 | 0 |
| 2 | DF | (Northern Ireland) | Michael Smith | 7 | 0 | 0 | 0 | 0 | 0 | 1 | 0 | 8 | 0 |
| 3 | DF | (Scotland) | Stephen Kingsley | 4 | 0 | 0 | 0 | 0 | 0 | 0 | 0 | 4 | 0 |
| 5 | DF | (Austria) | Peter Haring | 1 | 1 | 0 | 0 | 0 | 0 | 1 | 0 | 2 | 1 |
| 7 | MF | (England) | Jorge Grant | 3 | 0 | 0 | 0 | 0 | 0 | 2 | 1 | 5 | 1 |
| 8 | MF | (Germany) | Orestis Kiomourtzoglou | 5 | 0 | 0 | 0 | 0 | 0 | 1 | 0 | 6 | 0 |
| 9 | FW | (Scotland) | Lawrence Shankland | 5 | 0 | 0 | 0 | 2 | 1 | 3 | 0 | 10 | 1 |
| 10 | FW | (Northern Ireland) | Liam Boyce | 1 | 0 | 0 | 0 | 0 | 0 | 0 | 0 | 1 | 0 |
| 11 | MF | (Scotland) | Gary Mackay-Steven | 1 | 0 | 0 | 0 | 0 | 0 | 0 | 0 | 1 | 0 |
| 12 | DF | (Australia) | Nathaniel Atkinson | 6 | 0 | 0 | 0 | 0 | 0 | 2 | 0 | 8 | 0 |
| 14 | MF | (Australia) | Cameron Devlin | 5 | 1 | 0 | 0 | 0 | 0 | 0 | 0 | 5 | 1 |
| 15 | DF | (Australia) | Kye Rowles | 5 | 1 | 0 | 0 | 0 | 0 | 1 | 0 | 6 | 1 |
| 17 | MF | (Scotland) | Alan Forrest | 1 | 0 | 0 | 0 | 0 | 0 | 0 | 0 | 1 | 0 |
| 18 | MF | (Scotland) | Barrie McKay | 1 | 0 | 0 | 0 | 1 | 0 | 0 | 0 | 2 | 0 |
| 19 | DF | (England) | Alex Cochrane | 3 | 3 | 1 | 0 | 1 | 0 | 1 | 0 | 6 | 3 |
| 20 | DF | (Scotland) | Lewis Neilson | 0 | 0 | 0 | 0 | 0 | 0 | 0 | 1 | 0 | 1 |
| 21 | DF | (England) | Toby Sibbick | 5 | 1 | 0 | 0 | 0 | 0 | 1 | 0 | 6 | 1 |
| 27 | MF | (Scotland) | Connor Smith | 1 | 0 | 0 | 0 | 0 | 0 | 1 | 0 | 2 | 0 |
| 29 | FW | (England) | Stephen Humphrys | 2 | 0 | 0 | 0 | 0 | 0 | 0 | 0 | 2 | 0 |
| 30 | MF | (England) | Josh Ginnelly | 3 | 1 | 0 | 0 | 1 | 0 | 1 | 0 | 5 | 1 |
| 61 | FW | (Australia) | Garang Kuol | 2 | 0 | 0 | 0 | 0 | 0 | 0 | 0 | 2 | 0 |
| 72 | DF | (England) | James Hill | 3 | 0 | 0 | 0 | 0 | 0 | 1 | 0 | 3 | 0 |
| 77 | MF | (Scotland) | Robert Snodgrass | 9 | 1 | 0 | 0 | 0 | 0 | 0 | 0 | 9 | 1 |
| Total | | | | 63 | 6 | 1 | 0 | 8 | 1 | 16 | 2 | 89 | 9 |

=== Goal scorers ===
Last updated 27 May 2023

| Place | Position | Nation | Name | Premiership | League Cup | Scottish Cup | Europe | Total |
|---|---|---|---|---|---|---|---|---|
| 1 | FW | (Scotland) | Lawrence Shankland | 24 | 0 | 1 | 3 | 28 |
| 2 | MF | (England) | Josh Ginnelly | 11 | 0 | 1 | 0 | 12 |
| 3 | MF | (Scotland) | Alan Forrest | 4 | 0 | 0 | 1 | 5 |
| 3 | FW | (England) | Stephen Humphrys | 3 | 0 | 1 | 1 | 5 |
| 4 | MF | (Scotland) | Andy Halliday | 3 | 0 | 0 | 1 | 4 |
| 4 | MF | (Scotland) | Barrie McKay | 4 | 0 | 0 | 0 | 4 |
| 5 | DF | (Australia) | Nathaniel Atkinson | 1 | 0 | 0 | 1 | 2 |
| 5 | DF | (England) | Alex Cochrane | 2 | 0 | 0 | 0 | 2 |
| 5 | DF | (Australia) | Cameron Devlin | 1 | 0 | 1 | 0 | 2 |
| 5 | MF | (England) | Jorge Grant | 2 | 0 | 0 | 0 | 2 |
| 5 | DF | (Northern Ireland) | Michael Smith | 2 | 0 | 0 | 0 | 2 |
| 6 | FW | (Northern Ireland) | Liam Boyce | 1 | 0 | 0 | 0 | 1 |
| 6 | FW | (Australia) | Garang Kuol | 1 | 0 | 0 | 0 | 1 |
| 6 | FW | (Japan) | Yutaro Oda | 1 | 0 | 0 | 0 | 1 |
| 6 | DF | (Australia) | Kye Rowles | 1 | 0 | 0 | 0 | 1 |
| 6 | MF | (Scotland) | Robert Snodgrass | 1 | 0 | 0 | 0 | 1 |
| 6 | DF | (England) | Toby Sibbick | 0 | 0 | 1 | 0 | 1 |
| Total | | | | 62 | 0 | 5 | 7 | 74 |

=== Assists ===
Last updated 27 May 2023

| Place | Position | Nation | Name | Premiership | League Cup | Scottish Cup | Europe | Total |
|---|---|---|---|---|---|---|---|---|
| 1 | MF | (Scotland) | Barrie McKay | 6 | 0 | 0 | 0 | 6 |
| 2 | DF | (England) | Alex Cochrane | 5 | 0 | 0 | 0 | 5 |
| 2 | MF | (Australia) | Cameron Devlin | 4 | 0 | 0 | 1 | 5 |
| 2 | MF | (England) | Josh Ginnelly | 3 | 0 | 1 | 1 | 5 |
| 3 | MF | (Scotland) | Andy Halliday | 3 | 0 | 0 | 1 | 4 |
| 3 | FW | (Scotland) | Lawrence Shankland | 4 | 0 | 0 | 0 | 4 |
| 4 | MF | (England) | Jorge Grant | 2 | 0 | 0 | 1 | 3 |
| 4 | MF | (Scotland) | Robert Snodgrass | 3 | 0 | 0 | 0 | 3 |
| 5 | DF | (Australia) | Nathaniel Atkinson | 2 | 0 | 0 | 0 | 2 |
| 6 | MF | (Scotland) | Gary Mackay-Steven | 1 | 0 | 0 | 0 | 1 |
| 6 | DF | (Australia) | Kye Rowles | 1 | 0 | 0 | 0 | 1 |
| 6 | DF | (England) | Toby Sibbick | 1 | 0 | 0 | 0 | 1 |
| Total | | | | 34 | 0 | 1 | 4 | 39 |

=== Clean sheets ===
| R | Pos | Nat | Name | Premiership | League Cup | Scottish Cup | Europe | Total |
|---|---|---|---|---|---|---|---|---|
| 1 | GK | (Scotland) | Zander Clark | 5 | 0 | 2 | 0 | 7 |
| 2 | GK | (Scotland) | Craig Gordon | 1 | 0 | 0 | 1 | 2 |
| 3 | GK | (Scotland) | Ross Stewart | 0 | 0 | 0 | 0 | 0 |
| Total | | | | 6 | 0 | 2 | 1 | 9 |

Last updated: 27 May 2023
Source: Match reports in Competitive matches

== Team statistics ==
=== League table ===
| Pos | Team | Pld | W | D | L | GF | GA | GD | Pts | Qualification or relegation (Note: Teams play each other three times (33 matches), before the league is split into two groups (the top six and the bottom six).) |
|---|---|---|---|---|---|---|---|---|---|---|
| 2 | Rangers | 38 | 29 | 5 | 4 | 93 | 37 | +56 | 92 | Qualification for the Champions League third qualifying round |
| 3 | Aberdeen | 38 | 18 | 3 | 17 | 56 | 60 | −4 | 57 | Qualification for the Europa League play-off round |
| 4 | Heart of Midlothian | 38 | 15 | 9 | 14 | 63 | 57 | +6 | 54 | Qualification for the Europa Conference League third qualifying round |
| 5 | Hibernian | 38 | 15 | 7 | 16 | 57 | 59 | −2 | 52 | Qualification for the Europa Conference League second qualifying round |
| 6 | St Mirren | 38 | 12 | 10 | 16 | 43 | 61 | −18 | 46 | |

Rules for classification: 1) Points; 2) Goal difference; 3) Goals scored; 4) Head-to-Head points; 5) Head-to-Head goal difference; 6) Play-off (only if deciding champion, UEFA competitions qualification, second stage group allocation or relegation).

=== Division summary ===
| Round | 1 | 2 | 3 | 4 | 5 | 6 | 7 | 8 | 9 | 10 | 11 | 12 | 13 | 14 | 15 | 16 | 17 | 18 | 19 | 20 | 21 | 22 | 23 | 24 | 25 | 26 | 27 | 28 | 29 | 30 | 31 | 32 | 33 | 34 | 35 | 36 | 37 | 38 |
|---|---|---|---|---|---|---|---|---|---|---|---|---|---|---|---|---|---|---|---|---|---|---|---|---|---|---|---|---|---|---|---|---|---|---|---|---|---|---|
| Ground | H | A | H | A | H | A | A | H | A | A | H | A | H | A | H | H | A | A | H | A | H | H | A | H | H | A | H | A | A | A | H | A | H | H | A | H | A | A |
| Result | W | D | W | L | W | L | W | L | D | L | L | W | W | L | D | W | D | W | W | D | W | W | D | L | W | L | W | L | L | L | L | L | W | L | D | W | D | D |
| Position | 2 | 3 | 3 | 4 | 3 | 4 | 3 | 3 | 6 | 7 | 7 | 6 | 4 | 5 | 5 | 4 | 4 | 4 | 3 | 3 | 3 | 3 | 3 | 3 | 3 | 3 | 3 | 3 | 3 | 3 | 4 | 4 | 4 | 4 | 4 | 4 | 4 | 4 |

Updated to match(es) played on 27 May 2023. Source:
A = Away; H = Home; W = Win; D = Draw; L = Loss

=== Conference League table ===
| Pos | Team | Pld | W | D | L | GF | GA | GD | Pts | Qualification | IBS | FIO | HEA | RFS |
|---|---|---|---|---|---|---|---|---|---|---|---|---|---|---|
| 1 | (Turkey) İstanbul Başakşehir | 6 | 4 | 1 | 1 | 14 | 3 | +11 | 13 (Note: Tied on head-to-head points. Head-to-head goal difference: İstanbul Başakşehir +2, Fiorentina −2.) | Advance to round of 16 | — | 3–0 | 3–1 | 3–0 |
| 2 | (Italy) Fiorentina | 6 | 4 | 1 | 1 | 14 | 6 | +8 | 13 | Advance to knockout round play-offs | 2–1 | — | 5–1 | 1–1 |
| 3 | (Scotland) Heart of Midlothian | 6 | 2 | 0 | 4 | 6 | 16 | −10 | 6 | | 0–4 | 0–3 | — | 2–1 |
| 4 | (Latvia) RFS | 6 | 0 | 2 | 4 | 2 | 11 | −9 | 2 | | 0–0 | 0–3 | 0–2 | — |

Source: UEFA
Rules for classification: Group stage tiebreakers

=== Management statistics ===
Last updated 27 May 2023

| Name | From | To | P | W | D | L | Win% (Note: Win% is the percentage of matches won rounded to two decimal places.) |
|---|---|---|---|---|---|---|---|
| Robbie Neilson | 30 July 2022 | 9 April 2023 | 42 | 16 | 6 | 20 | 38.10 |
| Steven Naismith | 10 April 2023 | 28 May 2023 | 7 | 2 | 3 | 2 | 28.57 |

== Club ==
=== Management ===
Hearts began the season under the stewardship of Manager Robbie Neilson, who had been appointed following the clubs relegation to the Scottish Championship following the incompletion of the 2019–20 season. At the start of the 2022–23 season Neilson was awarded a new three-year contract.

Following a decline in form on 9 April 2023, Neilson parted ways with the club. His assistant Lee McCulloch also departed the club. Steven Naismith was appointed interim manager until the end of the season, assisted by Gordon Forrest and Frankie McAvoy.

=== International Selection ===
Over the course of the season a number of the Hearts squad were called up on international duty. Craig Gordon, Zander Clark and Lawrence Shankland was called up to represent Scotland, whilst Nathaniel Atkinson, Cameron Devlin and Kye Rowles were selected to represent Australia both in friendlies and at the 2022 FIFA World Cup.

=== Deaths ===
The following players and people associated with the club died over the course of the season. Former player and member of Hearts Hall of Fame Drew Busby, former player John Mackintosh, former chairman and chief executive Chris Robinson, former chairman Leslie Deans and former captain Chris Shevlane.

== Transfers ==
=== Players in ===
| Player | From | Fee |
|---|---|---|
| (Scotland) Alan Forrest | (Scotland) Livingston | Free |
| (Australia) Kye Rowles | (Australia) Central Coast Mariners | Undisclosed |
| (Scotland) Lewis Neilson | (Scotland) Dundee United | Free |
| (England) Alex Cochrane (Note: Was on Loan to Hearts during previous season.) | (England) Brighton & Hove Albion | Undisclosed |
| (England) Jorge Grant | (England) Peterborough United | Undisclosed |
| (Scotland) Lawrence Shankland | (Belgium) Beerschot | Undisclosed |
| (Germany) Orestis Kiomourtzoglou | (Netherlands) Heracles Almelo | Undisclosed |
| (Scotland) Zander Clark | (Scotland) St Johnstone | Free |
| (Scotland) Robert Snodgrass | Unattached | Free |
| (Japan) Yutaro Oda | (Japan) Vissel Kobe | Undisclosed |

=== Players out ===
| Player | To | Fee |
|---|---|---|
| (Scotland) John Souttar | (Scotland) Rangers | Free |
| (France) Loïc Damour | (France) Versailles | Free |
| (Scotland) Jamie Walker | (England) Bradford City | Free |
| (Scotland) Jamie Brandon | (Scotland) Livingston | Free |
| (Scotland) Chris Hamilton | (Scotland) Dunfermline Athletic | Free |
| (Romania) Mihai Popescu | (Romania) Farul Constanța | Free |
| (Republic of Ireland) Aaron McEneff | (Australia) Perth Glory | Undisclosed |
| (Scotland) Robert Snodgrass | Free agent | Free |

=== Loans in ===
| Player | From | Fee |
|---|---|---|
| (England) Stephen Humphrys | (England) Wigan Athletic | Loan |
| (England) James Hill | (England) Bournemouth | Loan |
| (Australia) Garang Kuol | (England) Newcastle United | Loan |

=== Loans out ===
| Player | To | Fee |
|---|---|---|
| (Scotland) Cammy Logan | (Scotland) Kelty Hearts | Loan |
| (Scotland) Jaden Ferguson | (Scotland) Forfar Athletic | Loan |
| (Scotland) Scott McGill | (Scotland) Kelty Hearts | Loan |
| (Scotland) Scott McGill | (Scotland) Raith Rovers | Loan |
| (Scotland) Euan Henderson | (Scotland) Queen's Park | Loan |
| (Scotland) Connor Smith | (Scotland) Hamilton Academical | Loan |
| (Scotland) Cammy Logan | (Scotland) Queen of the South | Loan |

== Contract extensions ==
The following players extended their contracts with the club over the course of the season

| Date | Player | Length | Previous Expiry | Expiry |
|---|---|---|---|---|
| 21 October 2022 | (Scotland) Finlay Pollock | 3 years | Summer 2022 | Summer 2025 |

== See also ==
- List of Heart of Midlothian F.C. seasons
