= 2020–21 Heart of Midlothian F.C. season =

Heart of Midlothian
2020–21 season
- Chairman: Ann Budge
- Manager: Robbie Neilson
- Stadium: Tynecastle Park
- Championship: Winners
- Scottish Cup: Second round
- League Cup: Second round
- Top goalscorer: League: Liam Boyce (14); All: Liam Boyce (16)
Home colours	Away colours	Third colours

The 2020–21 season was the 140th season of competitive football by Heart of Midlothian (Hearts), with the team participating in the Scottish Championship. It was the club's first season of play in the second tier of Scottish football since 2015, and only the second since 1983, having been relegated from the Scottish Premiership, after the previous season was ended early due to the COVID-19 pandemic in Scotland. On 10 April 2021, Hearts earned automatic promotion back to the Scottish Premiership, having been in first place for most of the season. They also competed in this season's Scottish League Cup and Scottish Cup, losing in the second round of each competition respectively.

Hearts had reached the semi-finals of the 2019–20 Scottish Cup before the COVID-19 pandemic stopped all football activity in Scotland during the previous season. Their semi-final against Hibs, which was originally due to be played in April, was rescheduled to take place later in the year. Hearts played the rearranged fixture against Hibs on 31 October, winning 2–1. On 20 December, they lost the 2020 Scottish Cup Final to Celtic in a penalty shootout following a 3–3 draw after extra time.

== Results and fixtures ==
Win Draw Loss Postponed

=== Pre-season / Friendlies ===
28 August 2020 Friendly	Heart of Midlothian	0–1	Sheffield United	Oriam
		Report	Fleck 7'	Attendance: None (Note: Attendance restricted due to COVID-19 restrictions.)

2 September 2020 Friendly	St Mirren	1–2	Heart of Midlothian	St Mirren Park
	McAllister 57'	Report	Roberts 33'; Walker 43'	Attendance: None

5 September 2020 Friendly	Burnley	4–1	Heart of Midlothian	Barnfield Training Centre
	Rodriguez 5' (pen.); Richardson 18'; Thompson 30'; Guðmundsson 47'	Report	Wighton 37'	Attendance: None

18 September 2020 Friendly	Heart of Midlothian	5–0	East Fife	Tynecastle Park
	Halkett 10'; Frear 29'; Walker 34'; Boyce 46'; Hamilton 79'	Report		Attendance: None

22 September 2020 Friendly	Heart of Midlothian	3–0	Falkirk	Oriam
	Boyce 44'; Walker 75'; Wighton 82' (pen.)	Report		Attendance: None

26 September 2020 Friendly	Heart of Midlothian	2–0	Partick Thistle	Tynecastle Park
	Walker 10'; Halkett 58'	Report		Attendance: None

2 October 2020 Friendly	Partick Thistle	0–2	Heart of Midlothian	Firhill Stadium
		Report	Walker 61'; Irving 74'	Attendance: None

=== Scottish Championship ===
Due to COVID-19 restrictions in Scotland forcing an October start to the Scottish Championship season, the length of the league was reduced from thirty-six to twenty-seven games. The fixture list for the truncated Championship was announced on 29 July, starting with a home game against Dundee.

16 October 2020 1	Heart of Midlothian	6–2	Dundee	Tynecastle Park
19:45	Smith 4'; Ginnelly 25'; Boyce 34' (Penalty); Kingsley 45+2', 84'; Halliday 90'	BBC Report	Adam 27'; Mullen 68'	Attendance: None; Referee: Munro

23 October 2020 2	Arbroath	0–1	Heart of Midlothian	Gayfield Park
19:45		BBC Report	Wighton 70'	Attendance: None; Referee: Aitken

7 November 2020 3	Heart of Midlothian	2–1	Inverness Caledonian Thistle	Tynecastle Park
19:45	Naismith 47'; Boyce 70'	BBC Report	Doran 86'	Attendance: None; Referee: Madden

20 November 2020 4	Dunfermline Athletic	2–1	Heart of Midlothian	East End Park
19:45	Thomas 49'; Murray 54'	BBC Report	Kingsley 84'	Attendance: None; Referee: Robertson

24 November 2020 5	Heart of Midlothian	3–0	Alloa Athletic	Tynecastle Park
19:45	Smith 6'; Halliday 24'; Haring 37'	BBC Report		Attendance: None; Referee: Irvine

5 December 2020 6	Greenock Morton	0–2	Heart of Midlothian	Cappielow
15:00		BBC Report	Walker 37', 48'	Attendance: None; Referee: Aitken

12 December 2020 7	Heart of Midlothian	6–1	Queen of the South	Tynecastle Park
15:00	Naismith 20'; Boyce 45+1', 46'; Walker 76'; Frear 82'; Ginnelly 90+1'	BBC Report	Obileye 72'	Attendance: None; Referee: Collum

26 December 2020 8	Heart of Midlothian	5–3	Ayr United	Tynecastle Park
15:00	Kingsley 11'; Wighton 68', 74'; Lee 71'; Boyce 81'	BBC Report	Smith 57'; McCowan 60'; Walsh 90+4'	Attendance: None; Referee: Munro

29 December 2020 9	Heart of Midlothian	3–1	Arbroath	Tynecastle Park
19:45	Naismith 30', 33', 36' (Penalty)	BBC Report	Doolan 48'	Attendance: None; Referee: Walsh

2 January 2021 10	Dundee	3–1	Heart of Midlothian	Dens Park
19:20	McGhee 14'; Mullen 36'; Afolabi 84' (pen.)		Irving 56'	Attendance: None; Referee: Robertson

16 January 2021 11	Alloa Athletic	1–3	Heart of Midlothian	Stark's Park
15:00	Williamson (yellow card) 84' (red card); Cawley 87'	BBC Report	Irving 35'; Frear 45'; Ginnelly 90+3'	Attendance: None; Referee: Muir

23 January 2021 12	Heart of Midlothian	2–3	Raith Rovers	Tynecastle Park
15:00	Boyce 58', 90'	BBC Report	Ugwu 5'; Duku 47' (pen.); Tumilty 52'	Attendance: None; Referee: Beaton

26 January 2021 13	Raith Rovers	0–4	Heart of Midlothian	Stark's Park
19:45			Boyce 36'; Henderson 39'; Gnanduillet 84', 90'	Attendance: None; Referee: Anderson

30 January 2021 14	Heart of Midlothian	1–0	Dunfermline Athletic	Tynecastle Park
15:00	Walker 81'	BBC Report		Attendance: None; Referee: Collum

5 February 2021 15	Ayr United	0–1	Heart of Midlothian	Somerset Park
19:45		BBC Report	Boyce 48' (Penalty)	Attendance: None; Referee: McLean

12 February 2021 16	Queen of the South	1–1	Heart of Midlothian	Palmerston Park
19:45	Obileye 43' (pen.)	BBC Report	Boyce 90' (Penalty)	Attendance: None; Referee: Steven

20 February 2021 17	Heart of Midlothian	1–1	Greenock Morton	Tynecastle Park
15:00	Walker 71'	BBC Report	McGuffie 53'	Attendance: None; Referee: Dickinson

26 February 2021 18	Inverness Caledonian Thistle	1–1	Heart of Midlothian	Caledonian Stadium
19:45	Storey 10'	BBC Report	Boyce 36'	Attendance: None; Referee: Walsh

6 March 2021 19	Heart of Midlothian	2–1	Dundee	Tynecastle Park
15:00	Halliday 35'; Gnanduillet 58'; Haring (red card) 90+4'	BBC Report	Cummings 63' (Penalty)	Attendance: None; Referee: Robertson

13 March 2021 20	Heart of Midlothian	2–0	Ayr United	Tynecastle Park
15:00	Gnanduillet 72'; Walker 86'	BBC Report		Attendance: None; Referee: Steven

20 March 2021 21	Arbroath	0–0	Heart of Midlothian	Gayfield Park
15:00		BBC Report		Attendance: None; Referee: Anderson

27 March 2021 22	Heart of Midlothian	2–3	Queen of the South	Tynecastle Park
15:00	Popescu 34'; Gnanduillet 72'	BBC Report	Shields 2', 22'; Irving 82' (Own goal)	Attendance: None; Referee: Duncan

3 April 2021 23	Dunfermline Athletic	0–0	Heart of Midlothian	East End Park
15:00		BBC Report		Attendance: None; Referee: Steven

9 April 2021 24	Heart of Midlothian	6–0	Alloa Athletic	Tynecastle Park
19:45	Boyce 26', 32' (Penalty), 53'; Henderson 51'; McEneff 71'; Walker 88'	BBC Report		Attendance: None; Referee: McLean

20 April 2021 25	Greenock Morton	0–0	Heart of Midlothian	Cappielow
19:05		BBC Report		Attendance: None; Referee: Beaton

24 April 2021 26	Heart of Midlothian	3–0	Inverness Caledonian Thistle	Tynecastle Park
15:00	Mackay-Steven 6', 31'; McEneff 9'	BBC Report		Attendance: None; Referee: Madden

30 April 2021 27	Raith Rovers	0–4	Heart of Midlothian	Stark's Park
19:45		BBC Report	Mackay-Steven 11', 73'; Henderson 57'; Naismith 70'	Attendance: None; Referee: Munro

=== Scottish Cup ===
23 March 2021 Second round	Brora Rangers	2–1	Heart of Midlothian	Dudgeon Park
19:45	MacRae 12'; MacLean 75'	BBC Report	Berra 70'	Attendance: None; Referee: Stuart

=== Scottish League Cup ===
Hearts were drawn into Group A of the League Cup group stage, alongside Cowdenbeath, East Fife Inverness Caledonian Thistle and Raith Rovers.

6 October 2020 Group stage	Heart of Midlothian	1–0	Inverness Caledonian Thistle	Tynecastle Park
19:45	Walker 62' (pen.)	SPFL Report		Attendance: None; Referee: McLean

10 October 2020 Group stage	Cowdenbeath	0–1	Heart of Midlothian	Bayview Stadium
15:00		SPFL Report	Halkett 78'	Attendance: None; Referee: Newlands

13 October 2020 Group stage	Heart of Midlothian	3–1	Raith Rovers	Tynecastle Park
19:45	Wighton 2' (pen.), 40' (pen.), 87'	SPFL Report	Duku 54'	Attendance: None; Referee: Napier

10 November 2020 Group stage	East Fife	2–3	Heart of Midlothian	Bayview Stadium
19:45	Hamilton 39'; Wallace 64'	BBC Report	Lee 1', 3'; Irving 62'	Attendance: None; Referee: Anderson

28 November 2020 Second round	Alloa Athletic	1–0 (a.e.t.)	Heart of Midlothian	Recreation Park
15:00	Trouten 109' (Penalty)	BBC Report		Attendance: None

== First team player statistics ==
=== Captains ===
Steven Naismith continued as captain for the 2020–21 season, having been appointed to the role during the previous season.

No	Pos	Country	Name	No of games	Notes
14	FW	(Scotland)	Naismith	14	Captain
1	GK	(Scotland)	Gordon	11	Vice Captain
5	DF	(Austria)	Haring	1	Vice Captain
6	DF	(Scotland)	Berra	4	Vice Captain
26	DF	(Scotland)	Halkett	5	Vice Captain

Last updated: 30 April 2021
Source: Competitive match reports.
Competitive matches only
Matches started as captain only
Country: FIFA nationality; No.: Squad number; P: Position; Name: Player name; No. Games: Number of games started as captain.

=== Squad information ===
During the 2020–21 campaign, Hearts used thirty-one players in competitive games. The table below shows the number of appearances (Note: Includes a total of 22 starting appearances and 10 substitute appearances by players in the delayed 2019–20 Scottish Cup matches, as specified (these are recorded under the 2019–20 season in some statistical resources).) and goals (Note: Includes a total of 5 goals scored by players in the delayed 2019–20 Scottish Cup matches, as specified (these are recorded under the 2019–20 season in some statistical resources).) scored by each player.

Last Updated 30 April 2021

Number	Position	Nation	Name	Totals		Championship		League Cup		Scottish Cup	
Number	Position	Nation	Name	Apps	Goals	Apps	Goals	Apps	Goals	Apps	Goals
1	GK	(Scotland) SCO	Craig Gordon (Note: Includes two starting appearances in the delayed 2019–20 Scottish Cup matches.)	31	0	26+0	0	3+0	0	2+0	0
2	DF	(Northern Ireland) NIR	Michael Smith	28	2	25+0	2	1+0	0	2+0	0
3	DF	(Republic of Ireland) IRL	Aidy White (Note: Includes one starting appearance and one substitute appearance in the delayed 2019–20 Scottish Cup matches.)	18	0	3+7	0	5+0	0	2+1	0
4	DF	(Scotland) SCO	John Souttar	4	0	4+0	0	0+0	0	0+0	0
5	DF	(Austria) AUT	Peter Haring (Note: Includes two substitute appearances in the delayed 2019–20 Scottish Cup matches.)	21	1	9+5	1	2+2	0	1+2	0
6	DF	(Scotland) SCO	Christophe Berra (Note: Includes one starting appearance in the delayed 2019–20 Scottish Cup matches.)	13	1	9+0	0	2+0	0	2+0	1
7	MF	(Scotland) SCO	Jamie Walker	27	8	10+10	7	3+1	1	3+0	0
8	MF	(England) ENG	Olly Lee	17	3	9+1	1	4+1	2	1+1	0
9	FW	(Ivory Coast) CIV	Armand Gnanduillet	14	5	8+5	5	0+0	0	1+0	0
10	FW	(Northern Ireland) NIR	Liam Boyce (Note: Includes two goals scored in the delayed 2019–20 Scottish Cup matches.)	29	16	24+1	14	1+0	0	2+1	2
11	FW	(England) ENG	Jordan Roberts	11	0	4+2	0	1+3	0	1+0	0
12	DF	(England) ENG	Shay Logan	5	0	5+0	0	0+0	0	0+0	0
13	GK	(Scotland) SCO	Ross Stewart	4	0	1+0	0	2+0	0	1+0	0
14	FW	(Scotland) SCO	Steven Naismith	26	6	11+9	6	2+2	0	1+1	0
15	FW	(Scotland) SCO	Craig Wighton (Note: Includes one goal scored in the delayed 2019–20 Scottish Cup matches.)	15	7	5+3	3	3+2	3	1+1	1
16	MF	(Scotland) SCO	Andy Halliday	30	3	24+2	3	1+1	0	2+0	0
17	MF	(Scotland) SCO	Gary Mackay-Steven	18	4	14+3	4	0	0	1+0	0
18	MF	(Republic of Ireland) IRL	Aaron McEneff	14	2	11+2	2	0+0	0	1+0	0
19	MF	(Scotland) SCO	Andy Irving	29	3	16+7	2	2+1	1	2+1	0
20	MF	(Scotland) SCO	Harry Cochrane	1	0	0+0	0	1+0	0	0+0	0
21	DF	(Scotland) SCO	Stephen Kingsley	26	5	20+0	4	2+2	0	2+0	1
24	MF	(England) ENG	Elliott Frear (Note: Includes one substitute appearance in the delayed 2019–20 Scottish Cup matches.)	12	2	5+3	2	2+1	0	0+1	0
25	MF	(Scotland) SCO	Jamie Brandon	5	0	1+0	0	4+0	0	0+0	0
26	DF	(Scotland) SCO	Craig Halkett	32	1	27+0	0	2+0	1	3+0	0
27	MF	(Scotland) SCO	Lewis Moore	1	0	0+0	0	1+0	0	0+0	0
28	DF	(Romania) ROU	Mihai Popescu	24	1	14+4	1	4+1	0	1+0	0
29	MF	(Curaçao) CUW	Gervane Kastaneer	7	0	3+3	0	0+0	0	1+0	0
30	MF	(England) ENG	Josh Ginnelly	10	4	3+3	3	2+1	0	0+1	1
31	FW	(Scotland) SCO	Euan Henderson	15	3	6+3	3	2+2	0	0+2	0
36	MF	(Scotland) SCO	Scott McGill	4	0	0+1	0	3+0	0	0+0	0
54	MF	(Scotland) SCO	Finlay Pollock	2	0	0+2	0	0+0	0	0+0	0

- Last updated: 30 April 2021
- Source: Match Reports
- Ordered by Squad Number.

Appearances (starts and substitute appearances) and goals include those in the Scottish Championship, League Cup and the Scottish Cup.

=== Disciplinary record ===
During the 2020–21 season, Hearts players were issued forty-five yellow cards (Note: Includes a total of ten yellow cards issued to players in the delayed 2019–20 Scottish Cup matches (these statistics are recorded under the 2019–20 season in some resources).) and one red. The table below shows the number of cards and type shown to each player.

Last updated 30 April 2021

Number	Position	Nation	Name	Championship		League Cup		Scottish Cup		Total	
Number	Position	Nation	Name	Booked	Sent off (straight red)	Booked	Sent off (straight red)	Booked	Sent off (straight red)	Booked	Sent off (straight red)
1	GK	(Scotland)	Craig Gordon	2	0	0	0	1 (Note: Includes one yellow card issued in the delayed 2019–20 Scottish Cup matches.)	0	3	0
2	DF	(Northern Ireland)	Michael Smith	2	0	0	0	2 (Note: Includes two yellow cards issued in the delayed 2019–20 Scottish Cup matches.)	0	4	0
3	DF	(Republic of Ireland)	Aidy White	0	0	0	0	0	0	0	0
4	DF	(Scotland)	John Souttar	1	0	0	0	0	0	1	0
5	DF	(Austria)	Peter Haring	2	1	0	0	0	0	2	1
6	DF	(Scotland)	Christophe Berra	0	0	0	0	0	0	0	0
7	MF	(Scotland)	Jamie Walker	4	0	1	0	1	0	5	0
8	MF	(England)	Olly Lee	2	0	0	0	0	0	2	0
9	FW	(Ivory Coast)	Armand Gnanduillet	1	0	0	0	0	0	0	0
10	FW	(Northern Ireland)	Liam Boyce	1	0	0	0	0	0	0	0
11	FW	(England)	Jordan Roberts	0	0	1	0	0	0	1	0
12	DF	(England)	Shay Logan	0	0	0	0	0	0	0	0
13	GK	(Scotland)	Ross Stewart	0	0	0	0	0	0	0	0
14	FW	(Scotland)	Steven Naismith	2	0	1	0	1	0	4	0
15	FW	(Scotland)	Craig Wighton	1	0	0	0	1	0	2	0
16	MF	(Scotland)	Andy Halliday	4	0	0	0	2	0	6	0
17	MF	(Scotland)	Gary Mackay-Steven	0	0	0	0	1	0	1	0
19	MF	(Scotland)	Andy Irving	4	0	0	0	1	0	5	0
20	MF	(Scotland)	Harry Cochrane	0	0	0	0	0	0	0	0
21	FW	(Scotland)	Stephen Kingsley	1	0	0	0	0	0	1	0
22	MF	(France)	Loïc Damour	0	0	0	0	0	0	0	0
23	GK	(Czech Republic)	Zdeněk Zlámal	0	0	0	0	0	0	0	0
24	MF	(England)	Elliott Frear	0	0	0	0	0	0	0	0
25	MF	(Scotland)	Jamie Brandon	0	0	0	0	0	0	0	0
26	DF	(Scotland)	Craig Halkett	3	0	0	0	1	0	3	0
27	MF	(Scotland)	Lewis Moore	0	0	0	0	0	0	0	0
28	DF	(Romania)	Mihai Popescu	0	0	0	0	1	0	1	0
29	MF	(Curaçao)	Gervane Kastaneer	1	0	0	0	0	0	1	0
30	MF	(England)	Josh Ginnelly	0	0	0	0	0	0	0	0
31	FW	(Scotland)	Euan Henderson	0	0	1	0	0	0	1	0
36	MF	(Scotland)	Scott McGill	0	0	1	0	0	0	1	0
54	MF	(Scotland)	Finlay Pollock	1	0	0	0	0	0	1	0
Total				32	1	5	0	12	0	45	1

=== Goal scorers ===
Last updated 30 April 2021

Place	Position	Nation	Name	Championship	League Cup	Scottish Cup	Total
1	FW	(Northern Ireland)	Liam Boyce	14	0	2	16
2	MF	(Scotland)	Jamie Walker	7	1	0	8
3	FW	(Scotland)	Craig Wighton	3	3	1	7
4	FW	(Scotland)	Steven Naismith	6	0	0	6
5	DF	(Scotland)	Stephen Kingsley	4	0	1	5
5	FW	(Ivory Coast)	Armand Gnanduillet	5	0	0	5
6	MF	(England)	Josh Ginnelly	3	0	1	4
6	MF	(Scotland)	Gary Mackay-Steven	4	0	0	4
7	MF	(England)	Olly Lee	1	2	0	3
7	MF	(Scotland)	Andy Halliday	3	0	0	3
7	FW	(Scotland)	Euan Henderson	3	0	0	3
8	DF	(Northern Ireland)	Michael Smith	2	0	0	2
8	MF	(Scotland)	Andy Irving	2	1	0	2
8	MF	(England)	Elliott Frear	2	0	0	2
8	MF	(Republic of Ireland)	Aaron McEneff	2	0	0	2
9	DF	(Austria)	Peter Haring	1	0	0	1
9	DF	(Scotland)	Craig Halkett	0	1	0	1
9	DF	(Scotland)	Christophe Berra	0	0	1	1
9	DF	(Romania)	Mihai Popescu	1	0	0	1
Total				63	8	6	74

=== Clean sheets ===
R	Pos	Nat	Name	Championship	League Cup	Scottish Cup	Total
1	GK	(Scotland)	Craig Gordon	13	2	0	15
2	GK	(Scotland)	Ross Stewart	0	0	0	0
Total				13	2	0	15

Last updated: 30 April 2021
Source: Match reports in Competitive matches

== Team statistics ==
=== League table ===
Pos	Team	Pld	W	D	L	GF	GA	GD	Pts	Promotion, qualification or relegation
1	Heart of Midlothian (C, P)	27	17	6	4	63	24	+39	57	Promotion to the Premiership
2	Dundee (O, P)	27	12	9	6	49	40	+9	45	Qualification for the Premiership play-off semi-final
3	Raith Rovers	27	12	7	8	45	36	+9	43	Qualification for the Premiership play-off quarter-final
4	Dunfermline Athletic	27	10	9	8	38	34	+4	39	Qualification for the Premiership play-off quarter-final
5	Inverness Caledonian Thistle	27	8	12	7	36	31	+5	36	

Source: SPFL
Rules for classification: 1) Points; 2) Goal difference; 3) Goals scored; 4) Head-to-to head points; 5) Head-to-head goal difference; 6) Play-off (only for deciding promotion, play-off participation and relegation).
(C) Champions; (O) Play-off winners; (P) Promoted

=== League Cup table ===
Pos	Team	Pld	W	PW	PL	L	GF	GA	GD	Pts	Qualification	HOM	RAI	ICT	EFI	COW
1	Heart of Midlothian	4	4	0	0	0	8	3	+5	12	Qualification for the Second round	—	3–1	1–0	—	—
2	Raith Rovers	4	2	1	0	1	7	7	0	8		—	—	p3–3	2–1	—
3	Inverness Caledonian Thistle	4	1	1	1	1	4	4	0	6		—	—	—	1–0	p0–0
4	East Fife	4	1	0	0	3	5	6	−1	3		2–3	—	—	—	2–0
5	Cowdenbeath	4	0	0	1	3	0	4	−4	1		0–1	0–1	—	—	—

Rules for classification: 1) points, 2) goal difference, 3) goals scored, 4) away goals scored, 5) matches won, 6) away matches won, 7) drawing of lots.

=== Division summary ===
Round	1	2	3	4	5	6	7	8	9	10	11	12	13	14	15	16	17	18	19	20	21	22	23	24	25	26	27
Ground	H	A	H	A	H	A	H	H	H	A	A	H	A	H	A	A	H	A	H	H	A	H	A	H	A	H	A
Result	W	W	W	L	W	W	W	W	W	L	W	L	W	W	W	D	D	D	W	W	D	L	D	W	D	W	W
Position	1	1	3	3	2	1	1	1	1	1	1	1	1	1	1	1	1	1	1	1	1	1	1	1	1	1	1

Updated to match(es) played on 30 April 2021. Source:
A = Away; H = Home; W = Win; D = Draw; L = Loss

=== Management statistics ===
Last updated on 30 April 2021

Name	From	To	P	W	D	L	Win% (Note: Win% is the percentage of matches won rounded to two decimal places.)
Robbie Neilson (Note: Includes two matches (one win, one draw followed by a lost penalty shootout) in the delayed 2019–20 Scottish Cup (these statistics are recorded under the 2019–20 season in some resources).)	6 October 2020	Present	35	22	7	6	62.86

== Club ==
=== Staff ===
Club staff
Name	Role
Robbie Neilson	Manager
Gordon Forrest; Lee McCulloch	First Team Assistant Manager
Andy Kirk	Hearts Women and Academy Manager
Karen Gibson	Club Medic

Boardroom
Name	Role
Ann Budge	Executive chairwoman
Andrew McKinlay	CEO
Jacqui Duncan	Finance Director
Stuart Wallace	Foundation of Hearts chairman
Eric Hogg	Non-Executive Director
Donald Cumming	Non-Executive Director
Kevin Windram	Non-Executive Director

=== Deaths ===
The following players and people associated with the club died over the course of the season. Former captain Jim Townsend, 2012 Scottish Cup winning captain Marius Zaliukas and former coach Walter Borthwick.

=== Management ===
Following football being suspended indefinitely during the previous season due to the COVID-19 pandemic, Manager Daniel Stendel advised the club he would not take any wages during the closed period and returned to Germany. Stendel's contract included a clause which rendered him a free agent should the club be relegated.

Following the vote to end the 2019–20 season and Hearts being relegated on an average points basis, Stendel's contract was ended, rendering him a Free Agent. Despite Stendel indicating he wished to negotiate a new contract, on 21 June 2020, Hearts appointed Dundee United Manager Robbie Neilson, He had previously managed Hearts between 2014 and 2016 and was awarded a three-year contract. Stendel's assistants Jorg Sievers and Dale Tonge also departed the club. On 12 August 2020, Neilson's former United assistants Gordon Forrest and Lee McCulloch were appointed as First Team Assistant Managers. They joined on a three-year deal.

=== International selection ===
Over the course of the season a number of the Hearts squad were called up on international duty. Craig Gordon was called up to represent Scotland while Michael Smith and Liam Boyce were selected to represent Northern Ireland.

=== Awards ===
==== SPFL awards ====
Name	Award
Robbie Neilson	Scottish Championship Manager of the Month December 2020
Robbie Neilson	Scottish Championship Manager of the Month April 2021

==== PFA awards ====
Name	Award
Liam Boyce	PFA Scotland Championship Player of the Year
Craig Gordon	PFA Scotland Championship Team of the Year
Michael Smith	PFA Scotland Championship Team of the Year
Andy Irving	PFA Scotland Championship Team of the Year
Liam Boyce	PFA Scotland Championship Team of the Year

== Transfers ==
=== Players in ===
Player	From	Fee
(Scotland) Craig Gordon	(Scotland) Celtic	Free
(England) Jordan Roberts	(England) Ipswich Town	Free
(England) Elliott Frear	(England) Forest Green Rovers	Free
(Romania) Mihai Popescu	(Romania) Dinamo București	Free
(Scotland) Andy Halliday	(Scotland) Rangers	Free
(Scotland) Stephen Kingsley	(England) Hull City	Free
(Scotland) Gary Mackay-Steven	(United States) New York City	Free
(Ivory Coast) Armand Gnanduillet	(Turkey) Altay	Free
(Republic of Ireland) Aaron McEneff	(Republic of Ireland) Shamrock Rovers	£175,000

=== Players out ===
Player	To	Fee
(Republic of the Congo) Clevid Dikamona	(Scotland) Kilmarnock	Free
(Kosovo) Donis Avdijaj	(Netherlands) FC Emmen	Free
(Scotland) Daniel Baur	(Scotland) Spartans	Free
(Australia) Oliver Bozanic	(Australia) Central Coast Mariners	Free
(Scotland) Rory Currie	(Scotland) Brechin City	Free
(Germany) Marcel Langer		Free
(Scotland) Steven MacLean	Retired	
(Scotland) Kelby Mason	(Scotland) Edinburgh City	Free
(Bulgaria) Alex Petkov	(Bulgaria) Levski Sofia	Free
(Scotland) Dean Ritchie	(Scotland) Airdrieonians	Free
(Republic of Ireland) Jay Nwanze	(Republic of Ireland) Wexford	Free
(Scotland) Brodie Strang		Free
(Northern Ireland) Bobby Burns	(England) Barrow	Free
(England) Sean Clare	(England) Oxford United	Undisclosed
(Scotland) Callumn Morrison	(Scotland) Falkirk	Free
(Northern Ireland) Conor Washington	(England) Charlton Athletic	Undisclosed
(Uganda) Uche Ikpeazu	(England) Wycombe Wanderers	Undisclosed
(Scotland) Aaron Hickey	(Italy) Bologna	£1,500,000
(Scotland) Anthony McDonald	(Spain) Córdoba	Free
(Australia) Ben Garuccio	(Australia) Melbourne City	Free

=== Loans in ===
Player	From	Fee
(Scotland) Ross Stewart	(Scotland) Livingston	Loan
(England) Josh Ginnelly	(England) Preston North End	Loan
(Curaçao) Gervane Kastaneer	(England) Coventry City	Loan
(England) Shay Logan	(Scotland) Aberdeen	Loan

=== Loans out ===
Player	From	Fee
(Republic of Ireland) Colin Doyle	(Scotland) Kilmarnock	Loan
(Czech Republic) Zdeněk Zlámal	(Scotland) St Mirren	Loan (Note: Emergency Seven Day Loan.)
(Scotland) Leeroy Makovora	(Scotland) Brechin City	Loan
(Scotland) Chris Hamilton	(Scotland) Dumbarton	Loan
(Scotland) Connor Smith	(Scotland) Arbroath	Loan
(Scotland) Harry Stone	(Scotland) Stirling Albion	Loan (Note: Emergency Loan. name="note3")
(Scotland) Harry Cochrane	(Scotland) Montrose	Loan
(Scotland) Harry Stone	(Scotland) Spartans	Loan (Note: Returned from Emergency loan at Stirling Albion, before being loaned out for a second time.)
(Scotland) Leeroy Makovora	(Scotland) Gala Fairydean Rovers	Loan
(England) Olly Lee	(England) Gillingham	Loan
(England) Jordan Roberts	(Scotland) Motherwell	Loan
(Scotland) Lewis Moore	(Scotland) Arbroath	Loan
(Scotland) Craig Wighton	(Scotland) Dunfermline Athletic	Loan
(Scotland) Harry Stone	(Scotland) Albion Rovers	Loan
(Czech Republic) Zdeněk Zlámal	(Scotland) St Johnstone	Loan

== See also ==
- List of Heart of Midlothian F.C. seasons
