= List of Scottish football transfers winter 2024–25 =

This is a list of Scottish football transfers featuring at least one 2024–25 Scottish Premiership club or one 2024–25 Scottish Championship club which were completed after the summer 2024 transfer window closed and before the end of the 2024–25 season.

== List ==
| Date | Name | Moving from | Moving to | Fee |
|---|---|---|---|---|
| 4 September 2024 | Freddie Rowe | Dunfermline Athletic | St Andrews United | Loan |
| 6 September 2024 | Jack McIntyre | Accrington Stanley | Ayr United | Free |
| 6 September 2024 | Jamie Hamilton | Hamilton Academical | Ayr United | Free |
| 6 September 2024 | Jamie Hamilton | Ayr United | East Kilbride | Loan |
| 6 September 2024 | Lucas McRoberts | Ayr United | Bonnyrigg Rose | Loan |
| 11 September 2024 | Samuel Cleall-Harding | Dundee United | Kelty Hearts | Loan |
| 11 September 2024 | Ewan McLeod | Dunfermline Athletic | Civil Service Strollers | Loan |
| 12 September 2024 | Dwight Gayle | Derby County | Hibernian | Free |
| 13 September 2024 | Oludare Olufunwa | St Johnstone | Hamilton Academical | Loan |
| 13 September 2024 | Connor Smith | St Johnstone | Hamilton Academical | Loan |
| 16 September 2024 | Kanayo Megwa | Hibernian | Partick Thistle | Loan |
| 19 September 2024 | Jay Emmanuel-Thomas | Greenock Morton | Free agent | Free |
| 19 September 2024 | Finlay Pollok | Heart of Midlothian | Raith Rovers | Loan |
| 20 September 2024 | Luke Graham | Dundee | Falkirk | Loan |
| 20 September 2024 | Andrew Tod | Dunfermline Athletic | East Fife | Loan |
| 20 September 2024 | Rhys Breen | Dunfermline Athletic | Annan Athletic | Loan |
| 20 September 2024 | Craig Clay | Sutton United | Dunfermline Athletic | Free |
| 23 September 2024 | Fankaty Dabo | Forest Green Rovers | Raith Rovers | Free |
| 24 September 2024 | Tyrece McDonnell | Queen's Park | Alloa Athletic | Loan |
| 24 September 2024 | Scott Tomlinson | Ayr United | Stenhousemuir | Loan |
| 25 September 2024 | Reece Evans | Leicester City | Queen's Park | Free |
| 27 September 2024 | Adam Carnwath | Dundee United | Cumbernauld Colts | Loan |
| 27 September 2024 | Filip Stuparević | Motherwell | Greenock Morton | Loan |
| 29 September 2024 | Fraser Taylor | St Mirren | Arbroath | Loan |
| 30 September 2024 | Robbie Mutch | Ayr United | Stranraer | Loan |
| 30 September 2024 | Dylan Smith | Ross County | Arbroath | Loan |
| 1 October 2024 | Lewis Reid | Queen's Park | Stranraer | Loan |
| 1 October 2024 | Jacob MacIntyre | Hibernian | Kelty Hearts | Loan |
| 1 October 2024 | Aiden McGeady | Ayr United | Retired | Free |
| 1 October 2024 | Wasiri Williams | Partick Thistle | Whitehawk | Free |
| 2 October 2024 | Dapo Mebude | KV Oostende | Dunfermline Athletic | Free |
| 3 October 2024 | John Tod | Dunfermline Athletic | St Andrews United | Loan |
| 3 October 2024 | Andrew Macleod | Ross County | Brora Rangers | Loan |
| 8 October 2024 | Seb Drozd | Millwall | Queen's Park | Free |
| 8 October 2024 | Ben McCrystal | St Johnstone | Berwick Rangers | Loan |
| 10 October 2024 | Max Thompson | MFK Skalica | Queen's Park | Free |
| 11 October 2024 | Connor McLennan | Salford City | Ayr United | Free |
| 15 October 2024 | Barry Douglas | Lech Poznań | St Johnstone | Free |
| 15 October 2024 | Božo Mikulić | Partizani Tirana | St Johnstone | Free |
| 15 October 2024 | Danny Wilson | Queen's Park | Livingston | Free |
| 17 October 2024 | Cody David | Accrington Stanley | Raith Rovers | Free |
| 18 October 2024 | Shaun Rooney | St Mirren | Fleetwood Town | Free |
| 26 October 2024 | Stuart McKinstry | Queen's Park | Hamilton Academical | Free |
| 3 November 2024 | Joseph Smith | Queen's Park | Broxburn Athletic | Loan |
| 8 November 2024 | Scott Bright | St Johnstone | Brechin City | Loan |
| 12 November 2024 | Jaden Brown | St Mirren | Free agent | Free |
| 12 November 2024 | Declan John | Bolton Wanderers | St Mirren | Free |
| 16 November 2024 | Lucas McCormick | Queen's Park | Albion Rovers | Loan |
| 28 November 2024 | Sean Kelly | Karmiotissa FC | Dundee | Free |
| 5 December 2024 | Ryan Shanley | Falkirk | Stirling Albion | Free |
| 6 December 2024 | Jordan Amissah | Sheffield United | Ross County | Free |
| 19 December 2024 | Mason McCready | Partick Thistle | Texoma | Free |
| 22 December 2024 | César Garza | Monterrey | Dundee | Loan |
| 1 January 2025 | Josh O'Connor | Hibernian | Crusaders | Undisclosed |
| 1 January 2025 | Owen Oseni | Gateshead | St Mirren | Undisclosed |
| 1 January 2025 | Ricky Korboa | Livingston | Maidenhead United | Free |
| 1 January 2025 | Nohan Kenneh | Hibernian | Ross County | Loan |
| 1 January 2025 | Elton Kabangu | Union SG | Heart of Midlothian | Loan |
| 2 January 2025 | Jake Doyle-Hayes | Hibernian | Sligo Rovers | Free |
| 2 January 2025 | Liam Morgan | Hamilton Academical | The Spartans | Loan |
| 2 January 2025 | Arran Preston | Hamilton Academical | The Spartans | Loan |
| 3 January 2025 | Jordan Doherty | Tampa Bay Rowdies | Raith Rovers | Free |
| 3 January 2025 | Jamie McCart | Rotherham United | Heart of Midlothian | £70,000 |
| 3 January 2025 | Robbie Fraser | Rangers | Livingston | Loan |
| 3 January 2025 | Zach Hemming | Middlesbrough | St Mirren | Loan |
| 3 January 2025 | Sam Kane | Queen's Park | Stranraer | Loan |
| 4 January 2025 | Josh Lane | Hamilton Academical | Stranraer | Loan |
| 4 January 2025 | Gallagher Lennon | St Mirren | Bonnyrigg Rose | Loan |
| 6 January 2025 | Jeppe Okkels | Preston North End | Aberdeen | Loan |
| 6 January 2025 | Kieran Phillips | Huddersfield Town | Ross County | Undisclosed |
| 7 January 2025 | Andy Fisher | Swansea City | St Johnstone | Loan |
| 7 January 2025 | Kai Andrews | Coventry City | Motherwell | Loan |
| 8 January 2025 | Aaron Donnelly | Nottingham Forest | Dundee | Undisclosed |
| 8 January 2025 | Kristers Tobers | Grasshopper | Aberdeen | £700,000 |
| 8 January 2025 | Cole McKinnon | Rangers | Ayr United | Loan |
| 9 January 2025 | Darragh O'Connor | York City | Falkirk | Loan |
| 9 January 2025 | Eamonn Brophy | Ross County | Falkirk | Loan |
| 9 January 2025 | Lenny Agbaire | Celtic | Ayr United | Loan |
| 9 January 2025 | Stephen Welsh | Celtic | K.V. Mechelen | Loan |
| 10 January 2025 | Lucas Stenhouse | Livingston | Bonnyrigg Rose | Loan |
| 10 January 2025 | Tony Gallacher | St Johnstone | Hamilton Academical | Free |
| 10 January 2025 | Jordan Allan | Falkirk | Queen of the South | Loan |
| 10 January 2025 | Víctor Griffith | Árabe Unido | St Johnstone | Undisclosed |
| 10 January 2025 | Max Sheaf | Ross County | Gateshead | Free |
| 11 January 2025 | Archie Mair | Norwich City | Motherwell | Loan |
| 11 January 2025 | Liam Boyce | Heart of Midlothian | Derry City | Free |
| 13 January 2025 | Imari Samuels | Brighton & Hove Albion | Dundee | Undisclosed |
| 13 January 2025 | Calvin Ramsay | Liverpool | Kilmarnock | Loan |
| 13 January 2025 | Jack Newman | Dundee United | Livingston | Loan |
| 13 January 2025 | Alfie Dorrington | Tottenham Hotspur | Aberdeen | Loan |
| 13 January 2025 | Alexander Jensen | Brommapojkarna | Aberdeen | £650,000 |
| 13 January 2025 | Odin Thiago Holm | Celtic | Los Angeles FC | Loan |
| 13 January 2025 | Owen Hayward | Falkirk | Dumbarton | Loan |
| 14 January 2025 | Fankaty Dabo | Raith Rovers | Free agent | Free |
| 14 January 2025 | Cody David | Raith Rovers | Mariehamn | Free |
| 14 January 2025 | James Lyon | Partick Thistle | Free agent | Free |
| 14 January 2025 | Ricco Diack | Partick Thistle | Airdrieonians | Loan |
| 15 January 2025 | Kye Rowles | Heart of Midlothian | D.C. United | £600,000 |
| 16 January 2025 | Jonathan Tomkinson | Norwich City | Ross County | Loan |
| 16 January 2025 | Zac Ashworth | Blackpool | Ross County | Loan |
| 16 January 2025 | Jamie Hamilton | Ayr United | East Kilbride | Free |
| 16 January 2025 | Roy Syla | Ayr United | Bylis | Free |
| 17 January 2025 | Jamie Taggart | Partick Thistle | Glenafton Athletic | Loan |
| 17 January 2025 | Aiden Marsh | Barnsley | Raith Rovers | Loan |
| 17 January 2025 | Connor Smith | St Johnstone | Hamilton Academical | Undisclosed |
| 17 January 2025 | Sam Curtis | Sheffield United | St Johnstone | Loan |
| 17 January 2025 | Adam Carnwath | Dundee United | Peterhead | Loan |
| 17 January 2025 | Meshack Ubochioma | Dundee United | Livingston | Loan |
| 17 January 2025 | Zeke Cameron | Dundee United | Cowdenbeath | Loan |
| 18 January 2025 | Rafael Fernandes | Lille | Rangers | Loan |
| 18 January 2025 | Owen Stirton | Dundee United | Montrose | Loan |
| 19 January 2025 | Alexandro Bernabei | Celtic | Internacional | Undisclosed |
| 20 January 2025 | David Keltjens | St Johnstone | Ironi Tiberias | Free |
| 20 January 2025 | Ruari Paton | Port Vale | Dundee United | Loan |
| 20 January 2025 | Lewis Fiorini | Stockport County | Dundee United | Loan |
| 20 January 2025 | Dom Thomas | Queen's Park | Derry City | Free |
| 21 January 2025 | Ben Jackson | Brighton & Hove Albion | Queen's Park | Loan |
| 21 January 2025 | Michael Steinwender | IFK Värnamo | Heart of Midlothian | Undisclosed |
| 21 January 2025 | Alex Lowry | Rangers | Wycombe Wanderers | Undisclosed |
| 22 January 2025 | Víctor López | Querétaro | Dundee | Loan |
| 23 January 2025 | Sam Stanton | Raith Rovers | Arbroath | Loan |
| 23 January 2025 | George Gitau | Middlesbrough | Raith Rovers | Loan |
| 23 January 2025 | Ellery Balcombe | Brentford | Motherwell | Loan |
| 23 January 2025 | Ricki Lamie | Ross County | Hamilton Academical | Loan |
| 23 January 2025 | Lewis Jamieson | St Mirren | Sacramento Republic | Undisclosed |
| 24 January 2025 | Connor Young | Edinburgh City | Dunfermline Athletic | Undisclosed |
| 24 January 2025 | Sander Kartum | Brann | Heart of Midlothian | Undisclosed |
| 24 January 2025 | Jonathan Svedberg | Halmstads | St Johnstone | Free |
| 24 January 2025 | Jamie Gullan | Dundalk | Raith Rovers | Free |
| 24 January 2025 | Kieran Freeman | Raith Rovers | Montrose | Loan |
| 24 January 2025 | Andy Winter | Livingston | Arbroath | Loan |
| 24 January 2025 | Luke Armstrong | Carlisle United | Motherwell | Loan |
| 24 January 2025 | Macaulay Tait | Heart of Midlothian | Livingston | Loan |
| 25 January 2025 | Curtis Main | Dundee | Ayr United | Free |
| 25 January 2025 | Dominic Thompson | Blackpool | Motherwell | Free |
| 26 January 2025 | Kieran Offord | St Mirren | Linfield | Undisclosed |
| 27 January 2025 | Jamie Hislop | Ayr United | Cumnock Juniors | Loan |
| 27 January 2025 | Kieran Dowell | Rangers | Birmingham City | Loan |
| 27 January 2025 | Kyogo Furuhashi | Celtic | Rennes | £10,000,000 |
| 27 January 2025 | Jota | Rennes | Celtic | £9,000,000 |
| 28 January 2025 | James McGarry | Aberdeen | Athens Kallithea | Loan |
| 28 January 2025 | Alasana Manneh | OB | Hibernian | Undisclosed |
| 28 January 2025 | Daniel Oyegoke | Heart of Midlothian | Hellas Verona | Undisclosed |
| 28 January 2025 | Daniels Balodis | RFS | St Johnstone | Free |
| 28 January 2025 | Victor Loturi | Ross County | CF Montréal | Free |
| 29 January 2025 | Alan Domeracki | Dundee United | Norwich City | Undisclosed |
| 29 January 2025 | Michael McKenna | Falkirk | East Fife | Free |
| 29 January 2025 | Liam McLeish | Queen's Park | Kelty Hearts | Loan |
| 30 January 2025 | Josh Landers | Hibernian | West Ham United | Undisclosed |
| 30 January 2025 | Allan Campbell | Luton Town | Dundee United | Free |
| 30 January 2025 | Elliot Watt | Burton Albion | St Johnstone | Loan |
| 30 January 2025 | Jack Hamilton | Ross County | Livingston | Free |
| 30 January 2025 | Codi Stark | Livingston | Bo'ness Athletic | Loan |
| 30 January 2025 | Rabbi Matondo | Rangers | Hannover 96 | Loan |
| 31 January 2025 | Jack Sanders | St Johnstone | MK Dons | Undisclosed |
| 31 January 2025 | Taylor Sutherland | Dunfermline Athletic | Clyde | Loan |
| 31 January 2025 | Murray Johnson | Hibernian | Queen of the South | Loan |
| 31 January 2025 | Archie Stevens | Rangers | Dunfermline Athletic | Loan |
| 31 January 2025 | Scott Constable | Dundee United | Stirling Albion | Loan |
| 31 January 2025 | Ephraim Yeboah | Bristol City | Dunfermline Athletic | Loan |
| 31 January 2025 | Charlie Sayers | Partick Thistle | Woking | Free |
| 1 February 2025 | Scott Williamson | Queen's Park | Clyde | Free |
| 1 February 2025 | Lennon Connolly | Queen's Park | Bo'ness United | Loan |
| 1 February 2025 | Adam Devine | Rangers | Queen's Park | Loan |
| 1 February 2025 | Luke Plange | Crystal Palace | Motherwell | Loan |
| 1 February 2025 | Will Dickson | Manchester City | Motherwell | Loan |
| 1 February 2025 | Luis Palma | Celtic | Olympiacos | Loan |
| 2 February 2025 | Charles Dunne | St Mirren | Coleraine | Free |
| 3 February 2025 | Callumn Morrison | Falkirk | Linfield | Undisclosed |
| 3 February 2025 | Mats Knoester | Ferencváros | Aberdeen | Free |
| 3 February 2025 | Oday Dabbagh | Charleroi | Aberdeen | Loan |
| 3 February 2025 | Duk | Aberdeen | Leganés | Undisclosed |
| 3 February 2025 | Harry Milne | Partick Thistle | Heart of Midlothian | Undisclosed |
| 3 February 2025 | Ethan Drysdale | Heart of Midlothian | Partick Thistle | Loan |
| 3 February 2025 | Scott Robinson | Partick Thistle | Hamilton Academical | Free |
| 3 February 2025 | Scott Martin | Hamilton Academical | Partick Thistle | Free |
| 3 February 2025 | Calum Ward | AC Oulu | Motherwell | Free |
| 3 February 2025 | Luke Amos | Hibernian | Perth Glory | Free |
| 3 February 2025 | Harry McKirdy | Hibernian | Bromley | Free |
| 3 February 2025 | Jeffrey Schlupp | Crystal Palace | Celtic | Loan |
| 3 February 2025 | Malachi Boateng | Heart of Midlothian | Plymouth Argyle | Undisclosed |
| 3 February 2025 | Ryan Alebiosu | Kortrijk | St Mirren | Loan |
| 3 February 2025 | Zach Mitchell | Charlton Athletic | St Johnstone | Loan |
| 3 February 2025 | Stephen Duke-McKenna | Harrogate Town | St Johnstone | Loan |
| 3 February 2025 | Tom Wilson-Brown | Leicester City | Kilmarnock | Loan |
| 3 February 2025 | Andy Murdoch | Ayr United | Clyde | Free |
| 3 February 2025 | Miller Thomson | Dundee United | Falkirk | Loan |
| 3 February 2025 | Luke Graham | Dundee | Falkirk | Loan |
| 3 February 2025 | Connor Allan | Rangers | Falkirk | Undisclosed |
| 3 February 2025 | Connor Allan | Falkirk | Kelty Hearts | Loan |
| 3 February 2025 | Scott Arfield | Bolton Wanderers | Falkirk | Free |
| 3 February 2025 | Jeremiah Chilokoa-Mullen | Leeds United | Dunfermline Athletic | Free |
| 3 February 2025 | Omar Taylor-Clarke | Bristol City | Dunfermline Athletic | Free |
| 3 February 2025 | Keith Bray | Inverness Caledonian Thistle | Dunfermline Athletic | Undisclosed |
| 3 February 2025 | Keith Bray | Dunfermline Athletic | Inverness Caledonian Thistle | Loan |
| 3 February 2025 | Owen Hampson | Sheffield United | Dunfermline Athletic | Loan |
| 3 February 2025 | Jadan Raymond | Crystal Palace | Queen's Park | Loan |
| 3 February 2025 | Kyle Hurst | Doncaster Rovers | Queen's Park | Loan |
| 3 February 2025 | Angus MacDonald | Aberdeen | Exeter City | Free |
| 4 February 2025 | Caelan McCrone | Falkirk | Civil Service Strollers | Loan |
| 4 February 2025 | Josh Rae | St Johnstone | Raith Rovers | Loan |
| 5 February 2025 | Olly Green | Livingston | Boston United | Free |
| 5 February 2025 | Sam Fisher | Dunfermline Athletic | Stenhousemuir | Loan |
| 5 February 2025 | Adam Montgomery | Celtic | Queen's Park | Loan |
| 5 February 2025 | Callum Penman | St Mirren | Arbroath | Loan |
| 6 February 2025 | Craig Wighton | Dunfermline Athletic | Montrose | Loan |
| 13 February 2025 | Slobodan Rubežić | Aberdeen | Novi Pazar | Loan |
| 13 February 2025 | Josh Reid | Ross County | Partick Thistle | Loan |
| 13 February 2025 | Tashan Oakley-Boothe | Estrela da Amadora | Dunfermline Athletic | Free |
| 13 February 2025 | Brodie Dair | St Johnstone | Fulham | Undisclosed |
| 14 February 2025 | Tomi Adeloye | Swindon Town | Greenock Morton | Free |
| 14 February 2025 | Richard Odada | Dundee United | OFK Beograd | Loan |
| 14 February 2025 | Logan Ross | Ross County | Clachnacuddin | Loan |
| 18 February 2025 | Charlie Telfer | Ross County | Hamilton Academical | Loan |
| 20 February 2025 | Lewis Budinauckas | Rangers | Partick Thistle | Loan |
| 21 February 2025 | Cammy MacPherson | St Johnstone | Tampa Bay Rowdies | Loan |
| 22 February 2025 | Kevin Holt | Dundee United | Derry City | Undisclosed |
| 25 February 2025 | Aaron Muirhead | Partick Thistle | Arbroath | Loan |
| 25 February 2025 | Dapo Mebude | Dunfermline Athletic | Septemvri | Loan |
| 26 February 2025 | Alex Jakubiak | Dunfermline Athletic | Partick Thistle | Free |
| 27 February 2025 | Sean Kelly | Dundee | Partick Thistle | Free |
| 28 February 2025 | Andre Raymond | St Johnstone | Dunfermline Athletic | Loan |
| 28 February 2025 | Leon King | Rangers | Queen's Park | Loan |
| 10 March 2025 | Daire O'Connor | Hamilton Academical | East Kilbride | Loan |
| 26 March 2025 | Yutaro Oda | Heart of Midlothian | Shonan Bellmare | Undisclosed |
| 26 March 2025 | Victor Wanyama | CF Montréal | Dunfermline Athletic | Free |
| 23 April 2025 | Toyosi Olusanya | St Mirren | Houston Dynamo | Undisclosed |

== See also ==
- List of Scottish football transfers summer 2024
- List of Scottish football transfers summer 2025
