= List of Scottish football transfers summer 2024 =

This is a list of Scottish football transfers, featuring at least one 2024–25 Scottish Premiership club or one 2024–25 Scottish Championship club, which were completed during the summer 2024 transfer window. The transfer window opened on 14 June 2024 and closed at 11:30pm on Friday 30 August 2024.

== List ==
Date	Name	Moving from	Moving to	Fee
3 May 2024	Liam Sole	Maidstone United	Livingston	Free
7 May 2024	Michael McKenna	Arbroath	Falkirk	Free
7 May 2024	Matthew Clarke	Linfield	Livingston	Free
8 May 2024	Sadat Anaku	Dundee United	Kampala Capital City Authority	Free
8 May 2024	Mark Birighitti	Dundee United	Perth SC	Free
8 May 2024	Mathew Anim Cudjoe	Dundee United	Bnei Sakhnin	Free
8 May 2024	Craig Moore	Dundee United	Free agent	Free
10 May 2024	Robbie Muirhead	Greenock Morton	Livingston	Free
10 May 2024	Jai Quitongo	Greenock Morton	Marsaxlokk	Free
10 May 2024	Alan Power	Greenock Morton	Free agent	Free
12 May 2024	Ricky Korboa	Woking	Livingston	Free
13 May 2024	Daniel Finlayson	Linfield	Livingston	Free
15 May 2024	Shaun Rooney	Fleetwood Town	St Mirren	Free
15 May 2024	Cillian Sheridan	Queen's Park	Brechin City	Free
16 May 2024	Stephen McGinn	Falkirk	Retired	Free
18 May 2024	Peter Haring	Heart of Midlothian	Free agent	Free
18 May 2024	Michael McGovern	Heart of Midlothian	Retired	Free
18 May 2024	Andy Halliday	Heart of Midlothian	Motherwell	Free
20 May 2024	Kurtis Guthrie	Livingston	Churchill Brothers	Free
20 May 2024	Joel Nouble	Livingston	Wuxi Wugo	Free
20 May 2024	Ayo Obileye	Livingston	Cangzhou Mighty Lions	Free
20 May 2024	James Penrice	Livingston	Heart of Midlothian	Free
22 May 2024	Chris Kane	St Johnstone	Dunfermline Athletic	Free
22 May 2024	Keanu Baccus	St Mirren	Mansfield Town	Free
22 May 2024	Kerr McInroy	Kilmarnock	Shelbourne	Free
23 May 2024	Robbie Crawford	Greenock Morton	Partick Thistle	Free
23 May 2024	Jérôme Prior	Pau	Livingston	Free
24 May 2024	George Oakley	Greenock Morton	Ayr United	Free
24 May 2024	Ellery Balcombe	Brentford	St Mirren	Loan
24 May 2024	Calum Butcher	Motherwell	Free agent	Free
24 May 2024	Blair Spittal	Motherwell	Heart of Midlothian	Free
24 May 2024	Jefté	Fluminense	Rangers	Undisclosed
24 May 2024	Lewis Smith	Hamilton Academical	Livingston	Free
25 May 2024	Anton Dowds	Partick Thistle	Ayr United	Free
25 May 2024	Callum Booth	St Johnstone	The Spartans	Free
27 May 2024	Lamar Reynolds	Maidstone United	Greenock Morton	Free
28 May 2024	Callum Fordyce	Airdrieonians	Raith Rovers	Free
28 May 2024	Jack Wilkie	Dundee	Arbroath	Free
29 May 2024	Reece McAlear	Tranmere Rovers	Livingston	Free
29 May 2024	Bruce Anderson	Livingston	Kilmarnock	Free
30 May 2024	Lewis Stevenson	Hibernian	Raith Rovers	Free
30 May 2024	Uche Ikpeazu	Port Vale	St Johnstone	Free
31 May 2024	Sam Nicholson	Colorado Rapids	Motherwell	Free
31 May 2024	Joe Hart	Celtic	Retired	Free
31 May 2024	Yan Dhanda	Ross County	Heart of Midlothian	Free
31 May 2024	Kenneth Vargas	Herediano	Heart of Midlothian	Undisclosed
31 May 2024	Harry Stone	Heart of Midlothian	Ayr United	Loan
31 May 2024	Mohamed Diomande	Nordsjaelland	Rangers	Undisclosed
31 May 2024	James Scott	Exeter City	St Mirren	Free
31 May 2024	James Brown	St Johnstone	Marine	Free
31 May 2024	Andy Considine	St Johnstone	Retired	Free
1 June 2024	Jordan Davies	Connah’s Quay Nomads	Greenock Morton	Free
1 June 2024	Ryan Jack	Rangers	Esenler Erokspor	Free
1 June 2024	Kemar Roofe	Rangers	Derby County	Free
2 June 2024	Aaron Reid	Aberdeen	Airdrieonians	Free
3 June 2024	Ross Stewart	Partick Thistle	Queen of the South	Free
3 June 2024	Óscar Cortés	Lens	Rangers	Loan
4 June 2024	Ethan Ross	Raith Rovers	Falkirk	Free
4 June 2024	Adam Masson	Raith Rovers	Bo'ness United	Free
4 June 2024	Aaron Arnott	Raith Rovers	Bonnyrigg Rose	Free
6 June 2024	Kyle Turner	Ross County	Partick Thistle	Free
6 June 2024	Jonny Hayes	Aberdeen	Retired	Free
6 June 2024	Will Ferry	Cheltenham Town	Dundee United	Free
6 June 2024	Calum Gallagher	Airdrieonians	Arbroath	Free
6 June 2024	Gabby McGill	Airdrieonians	Free agent	Free
7 June 2024	Dave Richards	Crewe Alexandra	Dundee United	Free
7 June 2024	Kai Montagu	East Kilbride	Raith Rovers	Free
10 June 2024	Jamie Sneddon	Partick Thistle	Falkirk	Free
10 June 2024	Josh Rae	Airdrieonians	St Johnstone	Free
10 June 2024	David Marshall	Hibernian	Retired	Free
11 June 2024	Charlie Albinson	Ayr United	Hamilton Academical	Free
11 June 2024	Kofi Balmer	Crystal Palace	Motherwell	Undisclosed
12 June 2024	Paul Smith	Ayr United	Annan Athletic	Free
12 June 2024	Barry Maguire	Motherwell	Hamilton Academical	Free
12 June 2024	Marley Redfern	Hamilton Academical	Clyde	Free
12 June 2024	Jack Wills	St Johnstone	Queen's Park	Free
12 June 2024	Shaun Byrne	Dundee	Raith Rovers	Free
12 June 2024	Tyler French	Dundee	Sutton United	Free
12 June 2024	Tom Sparrow	Stoke City	Motherwell	Free
13 June 2024	Steven Bradley	Livingston	Hamilton Academical	Free
13 June 2024	Lewis Gibson	Queen of the South	Raith Rovers	Free
13 June 2024	Calum Waters	Greenock Morton	Alloa Athletic	Free
14 June 2024	Cammy Ballantyne	St Johnstone	Linfield	Free
14 June 2024	Dylan Tait	Hibernian	Falkirk	Undisclosed
14 June 2024	Cammy Ballantyne	Airdrieonians	Greenock Morton	Free
14 June 2024	Matthew Wright	Ross County	Nairn County	Free
14 June 2024	Murray Johnson	Hibernian	Airdrieonians	Loan
14 June 2024	Anthony Stewart	Aberdeen	Ebbsfleet United	Free
14 June 2024	Gavin Molloy	Shelbourne	Aberdeen	Undisclosed
14 June 2024	Peter Ambrose	Újpest	Aberdeen	Undisclosed
14 June 2024	Oisin Smyth	Oxford United	St Mirren	Free
15 June 2024	John Koutroumbis	Perth Glory	Motherwell	Free
15 June 2024	Marco Rus	Coventry City	Ayr United	Undisclosed
15 June 2024	Lewis McGrattan	Greenock Morton	Airdrieonians	Free
15 June 2024	Rhys Armstrong	The Spartans	Airdrieonians	Free
16 June 2024	Sean McGinty	Ayr United	Hamilton Academical	Free
16 June 2024	Scott McMann	Dundee United	Ayr United	Free
18 June 2024	Jamie Smith	Hamilton Academical	Annan Athletic	Loan
18 June 2024	Owen Moffat	Blackpool	Greenock Morton	Undisclosed
18 June 2024	Logan Chalmers	Dundee United	Partick Thistle	Free
18 June 2024	Cameron Bruce	Queen's Park	Airdrieonians	Free
19 June 2024	Dario Viviani	Ayr United	Troon	Free
19 June 2024	Kyle McClelland	Hibernian	Coleraine	Loan
19 June 2024	Vicko Ševelj	NK Radomlje	Dundee United	Free
19 June 2024	Ethan Walker	Blackburn Rovers	Ayr United	Free
19 June 2024	Declan Glass	Dundee United	Cove Rangers	Free
19 June 2024	Ross Callachan	Ross County	Motherwell	Free
19 June 2024	Dimitar Mitov	St Johnstone	Aberdeen	Undisclosed
19 June 2024	Josh Edwards	Dunfermline Athletic	Charlton Athletic	Undisclosed
19 June 2024	Ryan Fulton	Hamilton Academical	Heart of Midlothian	Free
20 June 2024	Zach Robinson	AFC Wimbledon	Motherwell	Free
20 June 2024	Paul Hanlon	Hibernian	Raith Rovers	Free
20 June 2024	Ross Tierney	Motherwell	Bohemian	Undisclosed
20 June 2024	Connor Barron	Aberdeen	Rangers	Free
20 June 2024	Jack McMillan	Partick Thistle	Exeter City	Free
20 June 2024	Filip Stuparević	NK Domžale	Motherwell	Free
20 June 2024	Josh McPake	Stirling Albion	St Johnstone	Free
20 June 2024	Jack Sanders	Kilmarnock	St Johnstone	Free
21 June 2024	Clark Robertson	FC Ashdod	Dundee	Free
21 June 2024	Seb Palmer-Houlden	Bristol City	Dundee	Loan
21 June 2024	Daniel Oyegoke	Brentford	Heart of Midlothian	Undisclosed
21 June 2024	Ryan Strain	St Mirren	Dundee United	Free
21 June 2024	Arron Lyall	Rangers	Greenock Morton	Free
22 June 2024	Layton Bisland	Dundee United	Arbroath	Free
22 June 2024	Robbie Hemfrey	Airdrieonians	Arbroath	Free
24 June 2024	Josef Bursik	Club Brugge	Hibernian	Loan
24 June 2024	Alex Bannon	Queen's Park	Burton Albion	Undisclosed
24 June 2024	Musa Drammeh	Sevilla Atlético	Heart of Midlothian	Free
24 June 2024	Roland Idowu	Shrewsbury Town	St Mirren	Loan
24 June 2024	Liam Gordon	St Johnstone	Motherwell	Free
24 June 2024	Nathan Shaw	Inverness Caledonian Thistle	Greenock Morton	Free
25 June 2024	John Lundstram	Rangers	Trabzonspor	Free
25 June 2024	Borna Barišić	Rangers	Trabzonspor	Free
25 June 2024	Daniel MacKay	Hibernian	Partick Thistle	Free
25 June 2024	Lee Ashcroft	Dundee	Partick Thistle	Free
25 June 2024	Murray Aiken	Hibernian	Airdrieonians	Loan
25 June 2024	Darragh O'Connor	Greenock Morton	York City	Free
25 June 2024	Jack Walton	Luton Town	Dundee United	Loan
25 June 2024	Jaden Brown	Lincoln City	St Mirren	Free
25 June 2024	Scott McGill	Raith Rovers	Dundalk	Free
26 June 2024	Franny Amartey	Ayr United	Weymouth	Free
26 June 2024	Lewis Strapp	Greenock Morton	SJK	Free
26 June 2024	Warren O'Hora	Milton Keynes Dons	Hibernian	Free
26 June 2024	Terrell Agyemang	Middlesbrough	Airdrieonians	Loan
27 June 2024	Dylan Corr	Raith Rovers	Greenock Morton	Free
27 June 2024	Kristijan Trapanovski	KF Shkupi	Dundee United	Free
27 June 2024	Kieran Ngwenya	Aberdeen	Dunfermline Athletic	Free
27 June 2024	Will Nightingale	AFC Wimbledon	Ross County	Loan
27 June 2024	Jack Newman	Dundee United	Inverness Caledonian Thistle	Loan
27 June 2024	Liam Kelly	Motherwell	Rangers	Free
27 June 2024	Ben Wilson	Cliftonville	Airdrieonians	Free
27 June 2024	Cammy Cooper	Oxford United	Airdrieonians	Free
28 June 2024	Krisztián Hegyi	West Ham United	Motherwell	Loan
28 June 2024	Marvin Ekpiteta	Blackpool	Hibernian	Free
28 June 2024	Olly Green	Hull City	Livingston	Free
1 July 2024	Oscar MacIntyre	Hibernian	Queen of the South	Loan
1 July 2024	Clinton Nsiala	AC Milan	Rangers	Free
1 July 2024	Oli Shaw	Barnsley	Hamilton Academical	Free
1 July 2024	Ricki Lamie	Dundee	Ross County	Free
1 July 2024	Archie Meekison	Dundee United	Bohemian	Free
2 July 2024	Callan Elliot	Motherwell	Auckland FC	Free
2 July 2024	Roddy MacGregor	Inverness Caledonian Thistle	Queen's Park	Free
2 July 2024	Steve Seddon	Oxford United	Motherwell	Free
3 July 2024	Zak Delaney	Arbroath	Greenock Morton	Free
3 July 2024	David Wotherspoon	Dundee United	Dunfermline Athletic	Free
3 July 2024	Calum Brown	Ross County	Forres Mechanics	Loan
3 July 2024	Ceiran Loney	Partick Thistle	Everton	Undisclosed
4 July 2024	Ethan Ingram	West Bromwich Albion	Dundee	Free
4 July 2024	James Bolton	St Mirren	Fleetwood Town	Undisclosed
4 July 2024	Daniel Phillips	St Johnstone	Stevenage	Free
4 July 2024	Jack Hamilton	Livingston	Ross County	Free
4 July 2024	Marco Tilio	Celtic	Melbourne City	Loan
5 July 2024	Thomas Robson	Queen's Park	Clyde	Free
5 July 2024	Ryan McGowan	St Johnstone	Livingston	Free
5 July 2024	Hamza Igamane	AS FAR	Rangers	£1,700,000
5 July 2024	Rocco Vata	Celtic	Watford	Undisclosed
5 July 2024	Kyle Cameron	Notts County	St Johnstone	Loan
5 July 2024	Elliot Dunlop	Airdrieonians	Stranraer	Loan
5 July 2024	Kieran Wright	Rangers	Airdrieonians	Loan
5 July 2024	Alister Morrison	Ross County	Nairn County	Loan
5 July 2024	Charlie Telfer	Airdrieonians	Ross County	Free
6 July 2024	Morgan Boyes	Livingston	Greenock Morton	Free
8 July 2024	Gary Woods	Exeter City	Greenock Morton	Free
8 July 2024	Akil Wright	Stockport County	Ross County	Undisclosed
8 July 2024	Aaron Essel	Bechem United	St Johnstone	Free
8 July 2024	Ben Jackson	Brighton & Hove Albion	Livingston	Loan
8 July 2024	Aphelele Teto	Livingston	Chippa United	Loan
8 July 2024	Alex Greive	St Mirren	Bohemian	Free
9 July 2024	Brad McKay	Falkirk	Brechin City	Free
9 July 2024	Jack Baldwin	Ross County	Northampton Town	Undisclosed
9 July 2024	Ronan Hale	Cliftonville	Ross County	Undisclosed
9 July 2024	Chris Mochrie	Dundee United	Airdrieonians	Free
9 July 2024	Jake Hastie	Hartlepool United	Ayr United	Free
10 July 2024	Simon Murray	Ross County	Dundee	Undisclosed
10 July 2024	Robby McCrorie	Rangers	Kilmarnock	Undisclosed
10 July 2024	Andy Winter	Hamilton Academical	Livingston	Free
10 July 2024	Michael Hewitt	Hamilton Academical	Queen of the South	Free
10 July 2024	Zander Craik	Kilmarnock	Queen of the South	Loan
10 July 2024	Gerald Taylor	Deportivo Saprissa	Heart of Midlothian	Loan
11 July 2024	Jake Rennie	Dunfermline Athletic	Edinburgh City	Free
11 July 2024	Ricky Waugh	Queen's Park	Stirling Albion	Loan
11 July 2024	Bayley Klimionek	St Johnstone	Forfar Athletic	Loan
11 July 2024	Sivert Heltne Nilsen	SK Brann	Aberdeen	Undisclosed
12 July 2024	Ross Millen	Raith Rovers	Morecambe	Free
12 July 2024	Dennis Adeniran	Hapoel Petah Tikva	St Mirren	Free
13 July 2024	Alasdair Spalding	Airdrieonians	Arbroath	Free
13 July 2024	Aaron Quigg	Kilmarnock	Annan Athletic	Free
13 July 2024	Zak Rudden	Dundee	Queen's Park	Free
13 July 2024	Jordan Tillson	Ross County	Bath City	Free
14 July 2024	Oh Hyeon-gyu	Celtic	Genk	Undisclosed
14 July 2024	Mohammed Sangare	Livingston	Bellinzona	Free
14 July 2024	Scott Williamson	Queen's Park	Kelty Hearts	Loan
15 July 2024	Ruari Paton	Queen's Park	Port Vale	Undisclosed
15 July 2024	Marvin Kaleta	Wolverhampton Wanderers	Motherwell	Loan
16 July 2024	Ji Stevenson	Partick Thistle	Annan Athletic	Free
16 July 2024	Alex Iacovitti	Port Vale	St Mirren	Undisclosed
16 July 2024	Theo Bair	Motherwell	Auxerre	Undisclosed
16 July 2024	Cammy Kerr	Dundee	Queen's Park	Free
16 July 2024	Liam Russell	Queen's Park	Ayr United	Free
16 July 2024	David Babunski	Mezőkövesdi SE	Dundee United	Free
16 July 2024	Ruairidh Adams	Dundee United	Kelty Hearts	Loan
16 July 2024	Tom Ritchie	Aberdeen	Bonnyrigg Rose	Loan
16 July 2024	Andre Raymond	Vilar de Perdizes	St Johnstone	Free
16 July 2024	Viljami Sinisalo	Aston Villa	Celtic	£1,000,000
16 July 2024	Sean Kelly	Livingston	Karmiotissa	Free
17 July 2024	Nathan McGinley	Ayr United	Spennymoor Town	Free
17 July 2024	Ewan Henderson	Hibernian	Beerschot	Undisclosed
18 July 2024	Kasper Schmeichel	Anderlecht	Celtic	Free
18 July 2024	Jordan Allan	Falkirk	Clyde	Loan
18 July 2024	Mikey Devlin	Livingston	Ayr United	Free
18 July 2024	Kelle Roos	Aberdeen	Triestina	Free
19 July 2024	Carter Jenkins	Ayr United	University of Stirling	Free
19 July 2024	Greg Stewart	Kilmarnock	Mohun Bagan SG	Free
19 July 2024	Nikolay Todorov	Airdrieonians	Hamilton Academical	Free
19 July 2024	Ollie Ecrepont	Ayr United	East Stirlingshire	Loan
19 July 2024	Jojo Wollacott	Hibernian	Crawley Town	Undisclosed
19 July 2024	Jordan Smith	Stockport County	Hibernian	Free
19 July 2024	Arran Cocks	Brooke House College Football Academy	St Johnstone	Free
19 July 2024	Makenzie Kirk	Heart of Midlothian	St Johnstone	Undisclosed
19 July 2024	Arran Cocks	St Johnstone	Forfar Athletic	Loan
19 July 2024	Kai McLean	Celtic	Dunfermline Athletic	Free
19 July 2024	Jake Sutherland	Dunfermline Athletic	Cowdenbeath	Loan
20 July 2024	Malik Zaid	Hibernian	Annan Athletic	Loan
22 July 2024	Bailey Dall	Heart of Midlothian	Stirling Albion	Loan
23 July 2024	Daire O'Connor	Glentoran	Hamilton Academical	Undisclosed
23 July 2024	Johnly Yfeko	Rangers	Exeter City	Loan
24 July 2024	Jamie MacDonald	Greenock Morton	Heart of Midlothian	Free
24 July 2024	Benjamin Siegrist	Celtic	Rapid București	Undisclosed
24 July 2024	Toby Sibbick	Heart of Midlothian	Wigan Athletic	Undisclosed
24 July 2024	Jack Grieves	Watford	Ross County	Loan
24 July 2024	Max Anderson	Dundee	Crawley Town	Undisclosed
25 July 2024	Jort van der Sande	ADO Den Haag	Dundee United	Undisclosed
25 July 2024	Keith Watson	Raith Rovers	Arbroath	Free
25 July 2024	Josh O'Connor	Hibernian	Dundalk	Loan
25 July 2024	Joel Mumbongo	Hamilton Academical	Dumbarton	Free
26 July 2024	Ruaridh Lynch	Dundee	Cowdenbeath	Loan
26 July 2024	Max Little	Dunfermline Athletic	Coleraine	Free
26 July 2024	Richard Odada	Philadelphia Union	Dundee United	Undisclosed
26 July 2024	Nikola Ujdur	Inverness Caledonian Thistle	Queen's Park	Free
26 July 2024	Václav Černý	VfL Wolfsburg	Rangers	Loan
26 July 2024	Sam Lammers	Rangers	FC Twente	£2,500,000
26 July 2024	Aidan Denholm	Heart of Midlothian	Ross County	Loan
26 July 2024	Freddie Owens	Hibernian	Civil Service Strollers	Loan
26 July 2024	Jack Bearne	Greenock Morton	Hednesford Town	Free
26 July 2024	Jay Emmanuel-Thomas	Free agent	Greenock Morton	Free
27 July 2024	Sam Culbert	Livingston	Darvel	Loan
29 July 2024	Myles Roberts	Watford	Partick Thistle	Loan
29 July 2024	Corrie Fellows	Airdrieonians	Berwick Rangers	Free
30 July 2024	Connor Goldson	Rangers	Aris Limassol	£1,700,000
30 July 2024	Apostolos Stamatelopoulos	Newcastle Jets	Motherwell	Undisclosed
30 July 2024	Corrie Ndaba	Ipswich Town	Kilmarnock	Undisclosed
30 July 2024	Ziyad Larkeche	Queens Park Rangers	Dundee	Loan
30 July 2024	Lewis Neilson	Heart of Midlothian	St Johnstone	Loan
30 July 2024	Adam McMillan	St Johnstone	Albion Rovers	Loan
30 July 2024	Lucas Stenhouse	Livingston	Bo'ness United	Loan
31 July 2024	Noah Chilvers	Colchester United	Ross County	Undisclosed
1 August 2024	Robin Pröpper	FC Twente	Rangers	£1,500,000
1 August 2024	Paulo Bernardo	Benfica	Celtic	£3,500,000
1 August 2024	Jack Harkness	Rangers	Stirling Albion	Loan
2 August 2024	Adam Le Fondre	Hibernian	F.C. United of Manchester	Free
2 August 2024	Flynn Duffy	Dundee United	Inverness Caledonian Thistle	Free
2 August 2024	Ali Crawford	St Johnstone	Greenock Morton	Free
2 August 2024	Adam Mackinnon	Ross County	Inverness Caledonian Thistle	Free
2 August 2024	Jamie Williamson	Ross County	Nairn County	Loan
2 August 2024	Charlie Sayers	Tottenham Hotspur	Partick Thistle	Free
2 August 2024	Adam Emslie	Aberdeen	Cove Rangers	Loan
2 August 2024	Findlay Marshall	Aberdeen	Cove Rangers	Loan
2 August 2024	Oliver Bainbridge	Sunderland	Kilmarnock	Loan
3 August 2024	Malachi Boateng	Crystal Palace	Heart of Midlothian	Undisclosed
3 August 2024	Mykola Kukharevych	Swansea City	Hibernian	Loan
3 August 2024	Jackson Mylchreest	St Johnstone	Forfar Athletic	Loan
3 August 2024	Bryan Mwangi	Dundee United	Broxburn Athletic	Loan
3 August 2024	Meshack Ubochioma	Zalaegerszegi TE	Dundee United	Free
3 August 2024	Andy Murdoch	Ayr United	Clyde	Loan
6 August 2024	Junior Hoilett	Aberdeen	Hibernian	Free
7 August 2024	Ahkeem Rose	Ayr United	Hereford	Free
7 August 2024	Nicky Cadden	Barnsley	Hibernian	Free
7 August 2024	Rhys Walker	Falkirk	Cowdenbeath	Loan
7 August 2024	Liam Hoggan	Dunfermline Athletic	Gala Fairydean Rovers	Loan
7 August 2024	Emmanuel Adegboyega	Norwich City	Dundee United	Loan
8 August 2024	Blair Alston	Partick Thistle	Stenhousemuir	Free
8 August 2024	Kieron Bowie	Fulham	Hibernian	£600,000
8 August 2024	Ante Palaversa	Troyes	Aberdeen	Undisclosed
9 August 2024	Jamie Richardson	Dundee	Arbroath	Loan
9 August 2024	Finlay Allan	Dundee	Stenhousemuir	Loan
9 August 2024	Dane Murray	Celtic	Queen's Park	Loan
9 August 2024	Billy Koumetio	Liverpool	Dundee	Free
9 August 2024	Rory Whittaker	Hibernian	The Spartans	Loan
9 August 2024	Kyosuke Tagawa	Heart of Midlothian	Kashima Antlers	Undisclosed
9 August 2024	Henry Fieldson	Sunderland	Queen's Park	Free
10 August 2024	Chris Neeson	Hamilton Academical	Darvel	Loan
10 August 2024	Arran Preston	Hamilton Academical	Darvel	Loan
12 August 2024	Bosun Lawal	Celtic	Stoke City	£2,000,000
12 August 2024	Topi Keskinen	HJK Helsinki	Aberdeen	£860,000
12 August 2024	Casper Nilsson	Brighton & Hove Albion	Partick Thistle	Loan
13 August 2024	Tony Watt	Dundee United	Motherwell	Loan
13 August 2024	Kwon Hyeok-kyu	Celtic	Hibernian	Loan
14 August 2024	Adam Idah	Norwich City	Celtic	£8,500,000
14 August 2024	Jamie Taggart	Partick Thistle	St. Cadoc’s	Loan
14 August 2024	Matthew Connelly	Motherwell	East Kilbride	Loan
15 August 2024	Bojan Miovski	Aberdeen	Girona	£6,800,000
15 August 2024	Blair McKenzie	Aberdeen	Montrose	Loan
15 August 2024	Dylan Vente	Hibernian	PEC Zwolle	Loan
15 August 2024	Luca Stephenson	Liverpool	Dundee United	Loan
15 August 2024	Riley Harbottle	Hibernian	AFC Wimbledon	Undisclosed
15 August 2024	Sallu Turay	Partick Thistle	Benburb	Loan
15 August 2024	Josh Sims	Ross County	Yeovil Town	Free
18 August 2024	Tawanda Maswanhise	Leicester City	Motherwell	Free
19 August 2024	Ryan Duncan	Aberdeen	Queen's Park	Loan
20 August 2024	Jack Burroughs	Coventry City	Kilmarnock	Loan
20 August 2024	Logan Sinclair	Falkirk	Gala Fairydean Rovers	Loan
21 August 2024	Stevie May	St Johnstone	Livingston	Loan
21 August 2024	Killian Phillips	Crystal Palace	St Mirren	Loan
22 August 2024	Josh Nisbet	Central Coast Mariners	Ross County	Free
22 August 2024	Tobi Oluwayemi	Celtic	Dunfermline Athletic	Loan
22 August 2024	Lewis Jamieson	St Mirren	Raith Rovers	Loan
23 August 2024	Liam Parker	St Johnstone	Cove Rangers	Loan
23 August 2024	Daniel Kelly	Celtic	Millwall	£400,000
23 August 2024	Josh Cooper	Greenock Morton	Dunfermline Athletic	Free
23 August 2024	Luke Badley-Morgan	Stoke City	Airdrieonians	Loan
23 August 2024	Lewis O'Donnell	Dundee United	Queen of the South	Loan
23 August 2024	Liam Smith	Swansea City	Partick Thistle	Loan
23 August 2024	Terry Ablade	Fulham	Partick Thistle	Loan
23 August 2024	Richard Jensen	Aberdeen	Vejle	Loan
23 August 2024	Fraser Bryden	Ayr United	Queen of the South	Loan
24 August 2024	Paul Allan	Dunfermline Athletic	Inverness Caledonian Thistle	Free
24 August 2024	Kevin Nisbet	Millwall	Aberdeen	Loan
24 August 2024	Yuki Kobayashi	Celtic	Portimonense	Undisclosed
25 August 2024	Tommy Fogarty	Birmingham City	Dunfermline Athletic	Loan
26 August 2024	Ben Davies	Rangers	Birmingham City	Loan
26 August 2024	Matt O'Riley	Celtic	Brighton & Hove Albion	£25,000,000
27 August 2024	Gustaf Lagerbielke	Celtic	FC Twente	Loan
28 August 2024	Sammy Braybrooke	Leicester City	Dundee	Loan
28 August 2024	Álex Valle	Barcelona	Celtic	Loan
28 August 2024	Ryan Howley	Coventry City	Ayr United	Loan
28 August 2024	Jon McLaughlin	Rangers	Swansea City	Free
29 August 2024	Eli Campbell	Everton	Ross County	Loan
29 August 2024	Kacper Łopata	Barnsley	Ross County	Loan
29 August 2024	Connall Ewan	Ross County	Inverness Caledonian Thistle	Loan
29 August 2024	Julien Vetro	Burnley	Dundee	Loan
30 August 2024	Ethan Sutherland	St Mirren	Wolverhampton Wanderers	Undisclosed
30 August 2024	Luca Ross	Motherwell	Annan Athletic	Loan
30 August 2024	George Robesten	Ross County	Brora Rangers	Loan
30 August 2024	Arne Engels	Augsburg	Celtic	£11,000,000
30 August 2024	Auston Trusty	Sheffield United	Celtic	£6,000,000
30 August 2024	Luke McCowan	Dundee	Celtic	£1,000,000
30 August 2024	Neraysho Kasanwirjo	Feyenoord	Rangers	Loan
30 August 2024	Nedim Bajrami	Sassuolo	Rangers	£3,600,000
30 August 2024	Todd Cantwell	Rangers	Blackburn Rovers	£500,000
30 August 2024	Scott Wright	Rangers	Birmingham City	£300,000
30 August 2024	Mikey Johnston	Celtic	West Bromwich Albion	£1,000,000
30 August 2024	Tomoki Iwata	Celtic	Birmingham City	Undisclosed
30 August 2024	Brandon Forbes	Dundee United	Norwich City	Undisclosed
30 August 2024	Liam Grimshaw	Dundee United	Free agent	Free
30 August 2024	Sam Dalby	Wrexham	Dundee United	Loan
30 August 2024	Sean Borland	Dundee United	Cumbernauld Colts	Loan
30 August 2024	Rory MacLeod	Dundee United	Southampton	Loan
30 August 2024	Sebastian Lochhead	Dundee	Wolverhampton Wanderers	£300,000
30 August 2024	Oluwaseun Adewumi	Burnley	Dundee	Loan
30 August 2024	Nectarios Triantis	Sunderland	Hibernian	Loan
30 August 2024	Jack Iredale	Bolton Wanderers	Hibernian	Undisclosed
30 August 2024	Jair Tavares	Hibernian	Motherwell	Loan
30 August 2024	Allan Delferrière	Hibernian	Racing-Union	Loan
30 August 2024	Marcelo Pitaluga	Liverpool	Livingston	Loan
30 August 2024	Miles Welch-Hayes	Livingston	Maidenhead United	Loan
30 August 2024	Shamal George	Livingston	Wycombe Wanderers	Undisclosed
30 August 2024	Connor McAvoy	Fulham	Ayr United	Loan
30 August 2024	Jayden Richardson	Aberdeen	Boreham Wood	Free
30 August 2024	Jason Holt	Livingston	St Johnstone	Free
30 August 2024	Ryan Flynn	St Mirren	Arbroath	Free
30 August 2024	Joe Ellison	St Johnstone	Berwick Rangers	Loan
30 August 2024	Taylor Steven	St Johnstone	Cliftonville	Loan
30 August 2024	Jack Vale	Blackburn Rovers	Motherwell	Loan
30 August 2024	Connor Murray	Hamilton Academical	Coleraine	Loan
30 August 2024	Kevin van Veen	Groningen	St Mirren	Loan
30 August 2024	Gallagher Lennon	St Mirren	Annan Athletic	Loan
30 August 2024	Alfie Bavidge	Aberdeen	Ayr United	Loan
30 August 2024	Niall McGinn	Glentoran	Greenock Morton	Loan
30 August 2024	Max Guthrie	Ayr United	Stranraer	Loan

== See also ==
- List of Scottish football transfers winter 2023–24
- List of Scottish football transfers winter 2024–25
