= Andy Irving =

Scottish footballer

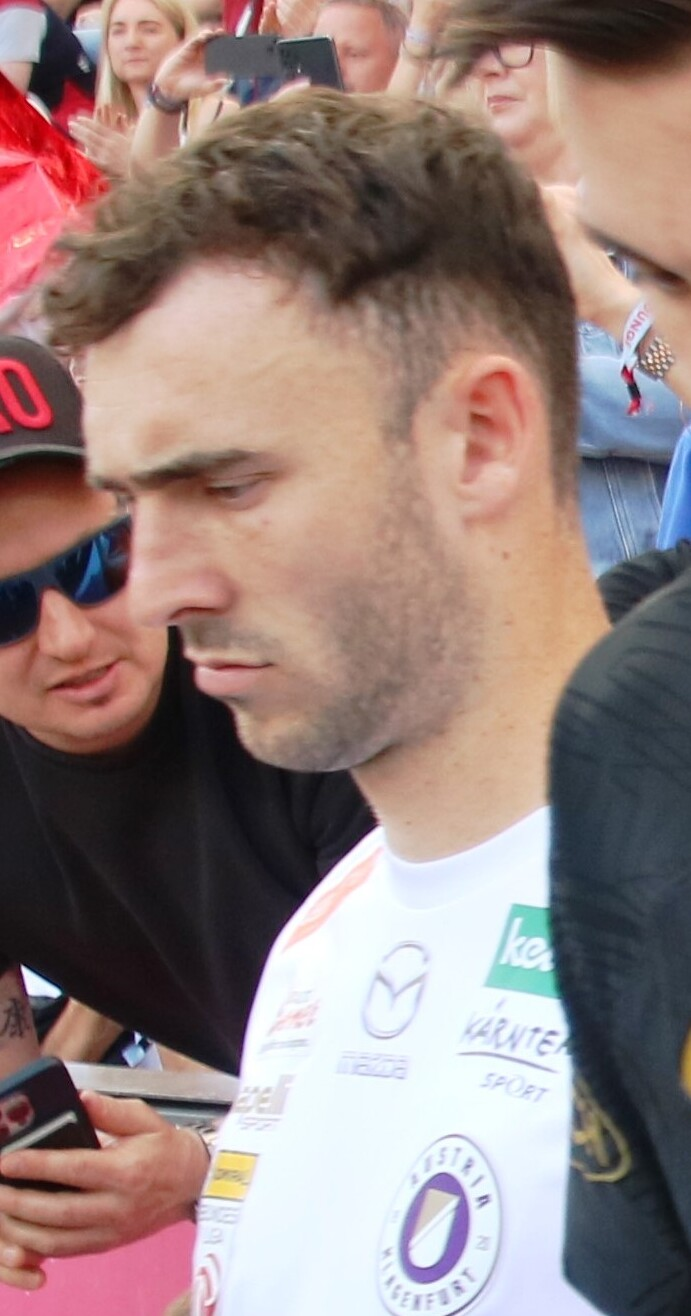
- Irving in 2023 with Austria Klagenfurt

Personal information
- Full name: Andrew Irving
- Date of birth: 13 May 2000 (age 26)
- Place of birth: Edinburgh, Scotland
- Height: 1.77 m (5 ft 10 in)
- Position: Midfielder

Team information
- Current team: Sparta Prague
- Number: 18

Youth career
- 2008–2017: Heart of Midlothian

Senior career*
Years	Team	Apps	(Gls)
2017–2021	Heart of Midlothian	46	(2)
2017–2018	→ Berwick Rangers (loan)	18	(2)
2018–2019	→ Falkirk (loan)	19	(0)
2021–2022	Türkgücü München	23	(1)
2022–2023	Austria Klagenfurt	31	(5)
2023–2026	West Ham United	17	(0)
2023–2024	→ Austria Klagenfurt (loan)	28	(9)
2026–	Sparta Prague	21	(3)

International career^{‡}
2017	Scotland U17	1	(0)
2018	Scotland U19	2	(0)
2020	Scotland U21	1	(0)
2025–	Scotland	1	(0)
- * Club domestic league appearances and goals as of 25 October 2026 ‡ National team caps and goals as of 02:12, 10 June 2025 (UTC)

Andrew Irving (born 13 May 2000) is a Scottish professional footballer who plays as a midfielder for Czech First League club Sparta Prague and the Scotland national team.

Irving has previously played for Heart of Midlothian, Berwick Rangers and Falkirk in Scotland, German side Türkgücü München and Austria Klagenfurt in Austria.

== Early life ==
Irving grew up in Edinburgh and attended Newcraighall Primary School and Portobello High School with football player Josh Doig.

== Club career ==
=== Heart of Midlothian ===
In June 2017, while a member of the Heart of Midlothian Under-20 team, Irving joined Berwick Rangers on loan until January 2018. He made 24 appearances for Berwick in all competitions, scoring twice.

Upon his return to Hearts he made his first team debut on 24 January 2018, playing from the start in a 3–0 victory against Hamilton Academical at New Douglas Park. In July 2018, Irving signed a new contract, extending his stay at the club until 2020.

Irving made his first appearance of the 2018–19 season as a 65th-minute substitute for Olly Lee in a Scottish League Cup tie with Cove Rangers. However, his contract extension had not been correctly lodged with the Scottish Football Association, rendering him ineligible to play as his registration had expired on 9 June. An SPFL disciplinary hearing took place on 23 July, as a result of which Hearts were deducted two points from the group stages and fined £10,000, with £8,000 of the fine suspended until the end of the next season.

On 31 July 2018, Irving was loaned to Scottish Championship side Falkirk until January 2019.

=== Türkgücü München ===
In June 2021, Irving signed for 3. Liga side Türkgücü München after the expiration of his contract at Hearts. On 25 July 2021, Irving made his debut for Türkgücü München in the 3. Liga, coming off the bench in a 0–0 draw against SC Verl away from home.

=== Austria Klagenfurt ===
In July 2022, Irving signed for Austrian Bundesliga outfit Austria Klagenfurt, after financial problems at Türkgücü München forced the club to resign from the 3. Liga in March 2022. Irving was sold to West Ham United on transfer deadline day in September 2023, but was immediately loaned back to Austria Klagenfurt. Despite neither club confirming the transfer at the time, this was eventually done by Austria Klagenfurt managing director Günther Gorenzel in December 2023. On 24 April 2024, Irving scored a 22-minute hat-trick against league leaders Red Bull Salzburg in a 4–3 win for Austria Klagenfurt.

=== West Ham United ===
He made his Premier League debut for West Ham United in September 2024, in a London derby against Chelsea which ended in a 3–0 defeat.

He made his first Premier League start for West Ham United in February 2025, once again against Chelsea, ending in a 2–1 defeat.

=== Sparta Prague ===
On 18 January 2026, Irving signed a contract with Czech First League club Sparta Prague.

== International career ==
Irving has represented Scotland at under-14, under-16, under-17, under-19, under-21 and senior level. He received a first senior international call-up on 1 October 2024, for Scotland's Nations League fixtures with Croatia and Portugal. He made his international debut on 9 June 2025 in a friendly game against Liechtenstein at Rheinparkstadion in Vaduz. Irving replaced John McGinn with 31 minutes remaining in a game which Scotland won 4–0.

== Career statistics ==
As of match played 19 March 2026

Appearances and goals by club, season and competition
Club	Season	League			National cup (Note: Includes Scottish Cup, DFB-Pokal, Austrian Cup, Czech Cup)		League cup (Note: Includes Scottish League Cup, EFL Cup)		Europe		Other		Total	
Club	Season	Division	Apps	Goals	Apps	Goals	Apps	Goals	Apps	Goals	Apps	Goals	Apps	Goals
Heart of Midlothian	2016–17	Scottish Premiership	0	0	0	0	0	0	—		—		0	0
Heart of Midlothian	2017–18	Scottish Premiership	4	0	—		—		—		—		4	0
Heart of Midlothian	2018–19	Scottish Premiership	1	0	0	0	2	0	—		—		3	0
Heart of Midlothian	2019–20	Scottish Premiership	17	0	3	1	5	1	—		—		25	2
Heart of Midlothian	2020–21	Scottish Championship	24	2	0	0	3	1	—		—		27	3
Heart of Midlothian	Total		46	2	3	1	10	2	0	0	0	0	59	5
Berwick Rangers (loan)	2017–18	Scottish League Two	18	2	2	0	4	0	—		0	0	24	2
Falkirk (loan)	2018–19	Scottish Championship	19	0	1	0	0	0	—		1 (Note: Appearance in Scottish Challenge Cup)	0	21	0
Türkgücü München	2021–22	3. Liga	23	1	1	0	—		—		—		24	1
Austria Klagenfurt	2022–23	Austrian Bundesliga	31	5	3	1	—		—		—		34	6
Austria Klagenfurt (loan)	2023–24	Austrian Bundesliga	28	9	2	1	—		—		—		30	10
West Ham United	2024–25	Premier League	10	0	0	0	1	0	—		—		11	0
West Ham United	2025–26	Premier League	7	0	0	0	0	0	—		—		7	0
West Ham United	Total		17	0	0	0	1	0	0	0	0	0	18	0
Sparta Prague	2025–26	Czech First League	6	0	1	0	—		2 (Note: Appearances in UEFA Conference League)	0	—		9	0
Career total			188	19	13	3	15	2	2	0	1	0	219	24
