= Walter Borthwick =

Scottish footballer and coach (1948–2021)

Personal information
- Full name: Walter Ross Borthwick
- Date of birth: 4 April 1948
- Place of birth: Edinburgh, Scotland
- Date of death: 24 April 2021 (aged 73)
- Position: Midfielder

Youth career
- Tynecastle Boys Club

Senior career*
Years	Team	Apps	(Gls)
1965–1966	Greenock Morton	8	(4)
1966–1967	Brighton & Hove Albion	1	(0)
1967–1974	East Fife	184	(34)
1974–1976	St Mirren	62	(11)
1976–1977	St Johnstone	22	(2)
1977–1978	St Mirren	1	(0)
1978–1981	Dunfermline Athletic	83	(6)
Total		361	(57)

Managerial career
- 1991: Arbroath
- * Club domestic league appearances and goals

Walter Ross Borthwick (4 April 1948 – 24 April 2021) was a Scottish football player and coach. He played for Greenock Morton, Brighton & Hove Albion, East Fife, St Mirren, St Johnstone, and Dunfermline Athletic. He later managed Arbroath and was the first team coach at Hearts during most of the 1980s. Borthwick subsequently worked for the Scottish Football Association in East Lothian, before retiring in March 2013.
