= Yūtarō Oda =

Japanese footballer (born 2001)

Yūtarō Oda 小田 裕太郎
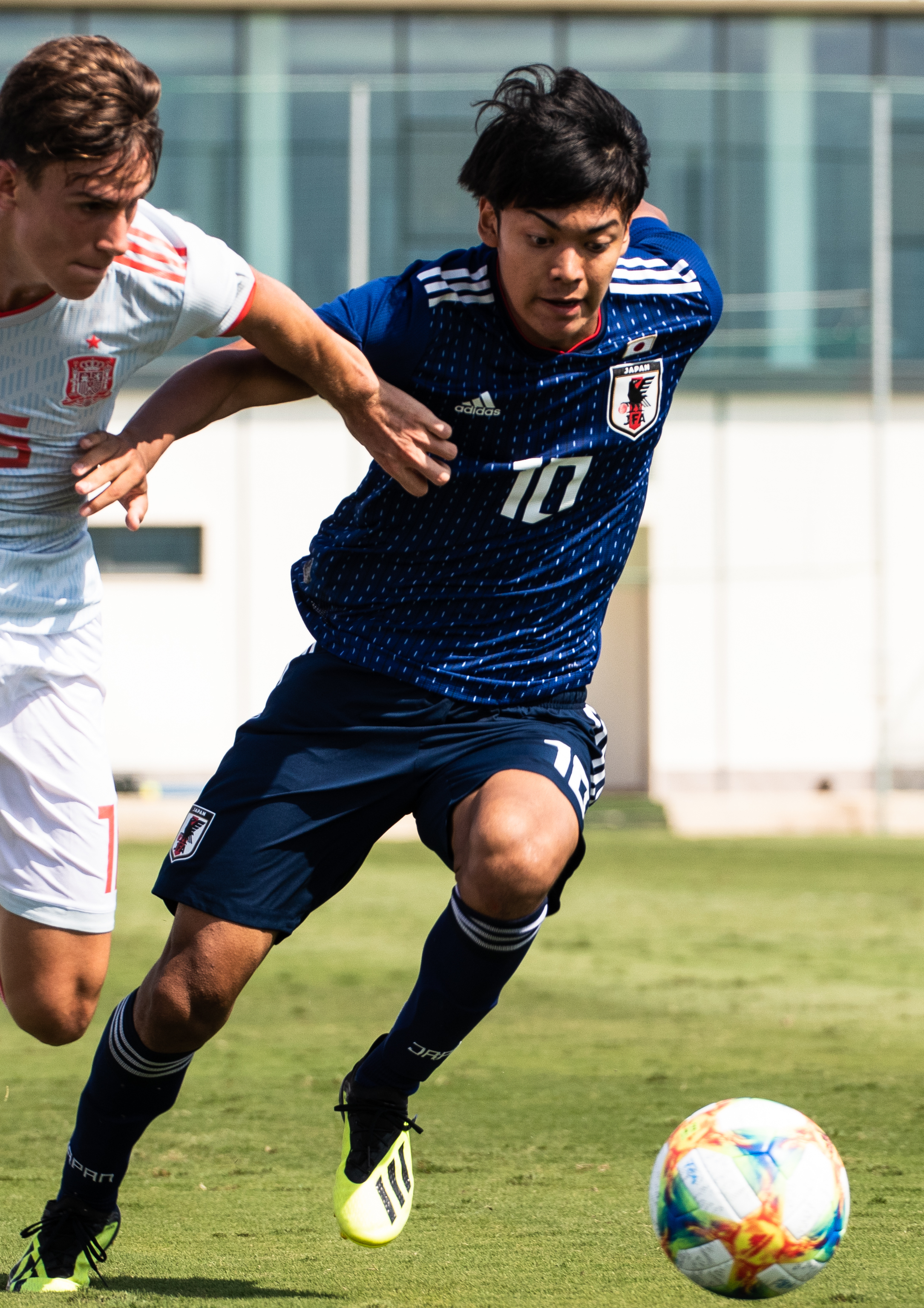

Personal information
- Date of birth: 12 August 2001 (age 25)
- Place of birth: Hyōgo, Japan
- Height: 1.81 m (5 ft 11 in)
- Position: Winger

Team information
- Current team: Shonan Bellmare
- Number: 9

Youth career
- Sumoto FC
- Vissel Kobe

Senior career*
Years	Team	Apps	(Gls)
2019–2023	Vissel Kobe	43	(2)
2023–2025	Heart of Midlothian	42	(7)
2025–	Shonan Bellmare	9	(1)

International career
2016	Japan U15	4	(1)
2017	Japan U16	3	(1)
2018	Japan U17	6	(4)
2019	Japan U18	3	(2)
2019	Japan U19	2	(1)
2023–	Japan U23	5	(0)
- * Club domestic league appearances and goals as of 16 September 2025

Yūtarō Oda (小田 裕太郎, Oda Yūtarō; born 12 August 2001) is a Japanese footballer who plays as a forward or a winger for Japanese J1 club Shonan Bellmare.

== Club career ==
=== Heart of Midlothian ===
On 10 January 2023, Oda signed for Scottish Premiership club Heart of Midlothian for an undisclosed fee on a three-and-a-half-year deal.

On 18 January 2023, he made his debut for the club, coming on as a 85th minute substitute, in a 5–0 win against Aberdeen. On the last game of the season against rivals Hibernian, Oda scored his first goal for Heart of Midlothian, in a 1–1 draw. At the end of the 2022–23 season, he made thirteen appearances and scoring once in all competitions. Oda later reflected on his first six months at the club, stating that he was adjusted to settling in Scotland for "two months or three months".

=== Shonan Bellmare ===
On 26 March 2025, Hearts announced Oda had moved to J1 club Shonan Bellmare.

== Career statistics ==
=== Club ===
As of 13 December 2024.

Club	Season	League			National Cup		League Cup		Continental		Other		Total	
Club	Season	Division	Apps	Goals	Apps	Goals	Apps	Goals	Apps	Goals	Apps	Goals	Apps	Goals
Vissel Kobe	2019	J1 League	0	0	0	0	1	0	–		–		1	0
Vissel Kobe	2020	J1 League	19	1	–		1	0	3	0	0	0	23	1
Vissel Kobe	2021	J1 League	3	1	2	0	4	0	–		–		9	1
Vissel Kobe	2022	J1 League	21	0	2	0	1	0	3	1	–		27	1
Heart of Midlothian	2022–23	Scottish Premiership	12	1	1	0	0	0	–		–		13	1
Heart of Midlothian	2023–24	Scottish Premiership	25	5	2	0	1	0	3	0	–		31	5
Heart of Midlothian	2024–25	Scottish Premiership	5	1	0	0	1	0	3	0	0	0	9	1
Career total			85	9	7	0	9	0	12	1	0	0	113	10
