= Lewis Neilson =

Scottish footballer

Personal information
- Date of birth: 15 May 2003 (age 23)
- Place of birth: Dundee, Scotland
- Height: 6 ft 3 in (1.91 m)
- Positions: Centre back; defensive midfielder

Team information
- Current team: Falkirk
- Number: 15

Youth career
- 2013–2020: Dundee United

Senior career*
Years	Team	Apps	(Gls)
2020–2022	Dundee United	15	(0)
2021	→ Falkirk (loan)	8	(0)
2022–	Heart of Midlothian	15	(0)
2023–2024	→ Partick Thistle (loan)	36	(1)
2024–2025	→ St Johnstone (loan)	17	(0)
2025–	→ Falkirk (loan)	16	(0)
2026	Falkirk	10	(0)

International career^{‡}
2018–2019	Scotland U16	2	(0)
2020	Scotland U17	1	(0)
2022–	Scotland U21	12	(1)
- * Club domestic league appearances and goals as of 20 May 2026 ‡ National team caps and goals as of 17 February 2025 (UTC)

Lewis Neilson (born 15 May 2003) is a Scottish professional footballer who plays for Scottish Premiership club Falkirk, primarily as a centre back or defensive midfielder.

Neilson has previously played for Dundee United and Heart of Midlothian, as well as on loan for Falkirk, Partick Thistle and St Johnstone.

== Club career ==
=== Dundee United ===
Neilson joined Dundee United at the age of 10 and signed his first professional contract with the club in the summer of 2019, before extending the contract until 2022 the following March. After graduating from the club's academy, he made his professional debut in a 1–1 draw against St Johnstone on the opening day of the 2020–21 Scottish Premiership season. Neilson was loaned to Falkirk in March 2021.

Following his return from loan, Neilson sustained an ankle injury, for which he required surgery. He did not appear in the United first team again until December 2021 when he started against Hibernian. Neilson departed United in June 2022 after turning down a new contract offer.

=== Hearts ===
After leaving Dundee United, Neilson signed a three-year contract with Hearts. In his first season with Hearts, he made 16 first-team appearances. But he did not feature in the final months and spent time involved with the club's B team.

==== Partick Thistle (loan) ====
On 3 August 2023, Neilson joined Scottish Premiership club Partick Thistle on a season-long loan.

Neilson scored the first goal of his professional career on 2 January 2024, scoring the winner for Thistle with a header from a corner, in a 3–2 home win over Queens Park.

Neilson played the first half of the season as a centre back for Thistle, before moving into a defensive midfielder role for the second half of the campaign.

==== St Johnstone (loan) ====
On 30 July 2024, Neilson joined Scottish Premiership club St Johnstone on loan for the 2024–25 season. Neilson was recalled early from his loan at St Johnstone, by his parent club Hearts on 1 January 2025.

== International career ==
Neilson has represented Scotland at under-16 and under-17 level.

In September 2022, Neilson was called up to the Scotland under-21 for friendlies against Northern Ireland under-21.

== Career statistics ==
As of 31 March 2025

Appearances and goals by club, season and competition
Club	Season	League			National Cup		League Cup		Other		Total	
Club	Season	Division	Apps	Goals	Apps	Goals	Apps	Goals	Apps	Goals	Apps	Goals
Dundee United	2020–21	Scottish Premiership	9	0	0	0	1	0	0	0	10	0
Dundee United	2021–22	Scottish Premiership	6	0	0	0	3	0	0	0	9	0
Dundee United	Total		15	0	0	0	4	0	0	0	19	0
Dundee United U21	2021–22	—	—						1 (Note: Appearances in the Scottish Challenge Cup, in which age-restricted teams from the Scottish Premiership clubs compete against senior clubs)	0	1	0
Falkirk (loan)	2020–21	Scottish League One	8	0	2	0	0	0	0	0	10	0
Heart of Midlothian	2022–23	Scottish Premiership	10	0	0	0	1	0	5	0	16	0
Heart of Midlothian	2023–24	Scottish Premiership	0	0	0	0	0	0	0	0	0	0
Heart of Midlothian	2024–25	Scottish Premiership	5	0	2	0	0	0	0	0	7	0
Heart of Midlothian	Total		15	0	2	0	1	0	5	0	23	0
Partick Thistle (loan)	2023–24	Scottish Championship	18	1	1	0	0	0	0	0	19	1
St. Johnstone FC (loan)	2024-25	Scottish Premiership	22	0	2	0	1	0	0	0	25	0
Falkirk (loan)	2025- 26	Scottish Premiership	16	0	3	0	5	0	0	0	24	0
Falkirk	2026- 27	Scottish Premiership	10	0	0	0	3	0	0	0	13	0
Career total			57	1	5	0	5	0	6	0	72	0
