= Gordon Forrest =

Scottish football coach and former player

Personal information
- Full name: Gordon Ian Forrest
- Date of birth: 14 January 1977 (age 49)
- Place of birth: Dunfermline, Scotland
- Height: 5 ft 9 in (1.75 m)
- Position: Midfielder

Team information
- Current team: Shenzhen Peng City (assistant coach)

Youth career
- Rosyth Recreation

Senior career*
Years	Team	Apps	(Gls)
1993–1996	Raith Rovers	1	(0)
1997–1999	Livingston	37	(5)
1999	Leiftur		
1999–2000	East Fife	26	(1)
2000–2005	Berwick Rangers	123	(18)
2005–2009	Burntisland Shipyard		

Managerial career
- 2009-2010: East Fife (chief scout)
- 2012-2013: Vancouver Whitecaps U23
- 2014-2018: Vancouver Whitecaps (assistant)
- 2019-2020: Dundee United (assistant)
- 2020-2024: Heart of Midlothian (assistant)
- 2024-: Shenzhen Peng City (assistant)
- * Club domestic league appearances and goals

Gordon Ian Forrest (born 14 January 1977) is a Scottish football coach and former player who is the currently assistant coach of Chinese Super League club Shenzhen Peng City. His playing career included spells with Raith Rovers, Livingston, East Fife and Berwick Rangers in Scotland, and Leiftur in Iceland. He has coached in Scotland, New Zealand and in Canada, where he was with Vancouver Whitecaps FC.

== Early life ==
Gordon Forrest was born in Dunfermline, Fife, on 14 January 1977. He was educated at Woodmill High School in the town and supported local football club Dunfermline Athletic.

== Playing career ==
Forrest began his senior career with Raith Rovers, joining as a youth from Rosyth Recreation in 1993. He made his Raith debut against Celtic in 1996 and also played in the UEFA Cup. When his former Raith manager Jimmy Nicholl moved to Millwall, Forrest had an extended trial with the English club before joining Livingston in 1997. After two and a half years there, he left in 1999 for a short spell in Iceland with Leiftur, where he again appeared in the UEFA Cup. Returning to Scotland, he joined East Fife in October 1999. He then joined Berwick Rangers in 2000, making over 100 league appearances before leaving in 2005. Forrest ended his playing career with amateur club Burntisland Shipyard.

== Coaching career ==
Having left senior football whilst still in his twenties, Forrest concentrated on his coaching career, obtaining a UEFA 'A' licence and youth and child coaching licences from the Scottish Football Association (SFA). He went on to work for the SFA as a Youth Development Officer in Edinburgh and Fife. In 2009 he returned to East Fife, working as first team coach under manager Stevie Crawford. In 2011, he emigrated to New Zealand to work as a football development manager for the Northern Football Federation. He was also assistant coach for the New Zealand women's national team at the 2012 Summer Olympics.

In October 2012, Forrest joined Canadian-based Major League Soccer (MLS) franchise Vancouver Whitecaps FC as head coach of their under-18 team and manager of coaching development. In January 2014 was promoted to working with the MLS team as an assistant coach to Carl Robinson. Whitecaps released Robinson and his coaching team, including Forrest, in September 2018.

Forrest returned to Scotland in January 2019 to take up the position of assistant head coach to Robbie Neilson at Scottish Championship club Dundee United, a role he shared with Lee McCulloch from June 2019 onwards. When Neilson left the club in June 2020 to become manager at Heart of Midlothian, Forrest and McCulloch were initially placed in temporary charge at United before joining Hearts as Neilson's assistants.

In June 2023, Forrest was named as first team coach of Hearts. He was dismissed in September 2024.
