= 2026–27 Heart of Midlothian F.C. season =

Heart of Midlothian
2026–27 season
- Chairman: Calum Paterson
- Head Coach: Wouter Vrancken
- Stadium: Tynecastle Park
- UEFA Champions League: Second qualifying round
- UEFA Europa League: Third qualifying round
- Highest home attendance: 18,721 vs. Dundee, 6 September 2026
- Lowest home attendance: 15,327 vs. Inverness Caledonian Thistle, 16 August 2026
- Average home league attendance: 18,679
Home colours	Away colours	Third colours

The 2026–27 season is the 146th season of competitive football by Heart of Midlothian (Hearts). Hearts are competing in the Scottish Premiership for the sixth consecutive season, having been promoted from the Scottish Championship at the end of the 2020–21 season.

In addition to the domestic league, they are also competing in the League Cup and will compete in the Scottish Cup. In European competition, Hearts entered the UEFA Champions League in the second qualifying round, where they were eliminated by Sturm Graz. They subsequently entered the UEFA Europa League, losing to Benfica in the third qualifying round, before defeating Rapid Wien on penalties in the play-off round of the UEFA Conference League to reach the league phase.

== Results and fixtures ==
Win Draw Loss Postponed

=== Pre-season / friendlies ===
1 July 2026 Closed Door Friendly	St Mirren	1–3	Heart of Midlothian	San Pedro del Pinatar, Spain
	Falconer 78'	Hearts Report	Kartum 8'; Mato 30'; Wilson 80'	Stadium: Pinatar Arena; Attendance: 0

10 July 2026 Closed Door Friendly	Heart of Midlothian	3–1	Kilmarnock	Edinburgh
	Kabore; Fagan-Walcott (o.g.)		Goal	Stadium: Oriam; Attendance: 0

10 July 2026 Scott Pittman Testimonial	Livingston	2–1	Heart of Midlothian XI	Livingston
19:45	Palmer 22'; Sinclair 36'	Hearts Report	Renaud	Stadium: Almondvale Stadium; Referee: Clancy

14 July 2026 Colin Hamilton Testimonial	Arbroath	1–2	Heart of Midlothian XI	Arbroath
19:30	Winter 67'	Hearts Report	Kaboré 28'; Kyziridis 66'	Stadium: Gayfield Park; Attendance: 1,017; Referee: Walsh

17 July 2026 Friendly	Heart of Midlothian	2–1	Rayo Vallecano	Edinburgh
	Ba-Sy 18', 34'	Hearts Report	Camello 60'	Stadium: Tynecastle Park; Attendance: 14,557; Referee: Robertson
Note: 140th Anniversary game

24 July 2026 Friendly	Raith Rovers	0–1	Heart of Midlothian	Kirkcaldy
19:30			Mato 87'	Stadium: Stark's Park; Referee: Dickinson

=== Scottish Premiership ===
1 August 2026 1	Aberdeen	2–1	Heart of Midlothian	Aberdeen
17:30 BST	Mayo 90'; Nisbet 90+5' (pen.)	Report	McEntee 35'; Findlay (red card) 90+3'	Stadium: Pittodrie Stadium; Attendance: 18,513; Referee: Dickinson

9 August 2026 2	Heart of Midlothian	4–0	Dundee United	Edinburgh
15:00 BST	Renaud 4'; Miller 12' (pen.); Braga 56'; McPake 67'	Report		Stadium: Tynecastle Park; Attendance: 18,602; Referee: Clancy

22 August 2026 3	Falkirk	P–P	Heart of Midlothian	Falkirk
15:00 BST				Stadium: Falkirk Stadium
Note: Fixture was postponed due to Hearts' participation in the UEFA Conference League play-off round.

29 August 2026 4	Heart of Midlothian	2–1	St Johnstone	Edinburgh
15:00 BST	Wilson 9'; Alić 39' (o.g.)	Report	Paton 48'	Stadium: Tynecastle Park; Attendance: 18,714; Referee: Lee

3 September 2026 5	Hibernian	1–3	Heart of Midlothian	Edinburgh
19:45 BST	Iredale (yellow card) 45' (yellow-red card) 62'; Mayor 51'	Report	Wilson 13'; Mendy 43'; McPake 66'	Stadium: Easter Road; Attendance: 19,656; Referee: Robertson

6 September 2026 6	Heart of Midlothian	2–1	Dundee	Edinburgh
15:00 BST	Braga 84' (pen.); Kerjota 90+6'	Report	Fink 17'; Bešir (red card) 90+1'	Stadium: Tynecastle Park; Attendance: 18,721; Referee: Graham

15 September 2026 3	Falkirk	2–1	Heart of Midlothian	Falkirk
19:45 BST	Krauhaus 8'; Eames 68'	Report	Wilson 22'	Stadium: Falkirk Stadium; Attendance: 7,034; Referee: Beaton

19 September 2026 7	Kilmarnock	1–1	Heart of Midlothian	Kilmarnock
17:45 BST	McCart 16' (o.g.)	Report	Kingsley 86'	Stadium: Rugby Park; Attendance: 7,452; Referee: Nicolson

10 October 2026 8	Heart of Midlothian	5–0	St Mirren	Edinburgh
15:00 BST	Mendy 20'; Miller 32' (pen.), 50' (pen.); Braga 54'; McPake 80'	Report		Stadium: Tynecastle Park; Attendance: 18,582; Referee: Walsh

18 October 2026 9	Celtic	7–1	Heart of Midlothian	Glasgow
15:00 BST	Tierney 7'; Nygren 10', 83'; Osmand 36', 38'; Baur 45+1'; Durán 49'	Report	Mendy 41'	Stadium: Celtic Park; Attendance: 59,132; Referee: Dickinson

25 October 2026 10	Motherwell	0–2	Heart of Midlothian	Motherwell
14:00 GMT		Report	Braga 29'; Miller 86'	Stadium: Fir Park; Attendance: 9,911; Referee: Nicolson

28 October 2026 11	Heart of Midlothian	2–2	Rangers	Edinburgh
20:00 GMT	Braga 48'; Miller 57'	Report	Kelsy 16'; Makhanya 89'	Stadium: Tynecastle Park; Attendance: 18,692; Referee: Robertson

31 October 2026 12	Dundee United	P–P	Heart of Midlothian	Dundee
15:00 GMT				Stadium: Tannadice Park
Note: Fixture was postponed due to Hearts' participation in the Scottish League Cup semi-finals.

8 November 2026 13	Heart of Midlothian	2–5	Falkirk	Edinburgh
15:00 GMT	Guendouz 50'; Braga 75' (pen.)	Report	Barbrook 4'; Eames 17'; Murrell 33', 47'; Henderson 45+2'	Stadium: Tynecastle Park; Attendance: 18,760; Referee: MacDermid

21 November 2026 14	Dundee	0–8	Heart of Midlothian	Dundee
17:45 GMT	Bevan (red card) 56'	Report	Kerjota 23', 81'; Kaboré 25', 32'; Finnigan 40' (o.g.); Braga 72'; Guendouz 79'; Findlay 89'	Stadium: Dens Park; Attendance: 7,974; Referee: McLean

=== Scottish League Cup ===
16 August 2026 Second round	Heart of Midlothian	6–2	Inverness Caledonian Thistle	Edinburgh
14:00 BST	Borchgrevink 16'; Mato 59'; Miller 82' (pen.), 90+4'; Wilson 84'; Braga 90+1'	Report	Duncan 54'; Bavidge 56'	Stadium: Tynecastle Park; Attendance: 15,327; Referee: Scott

11 September 2026 Quarter-finals	Stenhousemuir	0–3	Heart of Midlothian	Stenhousemuir
19:45 BST		Report	Williams 35'; Mato 39'; Dhanda 74'	Stadium: Ochilview Park; Attendance: 2,306; Referee: Scott

1 November 2026 Semi-finals	Heart of Midlothian	1–2	Hibernian	Glasgow
15:00 GMT	Braga 4'	Report	Boyle 19'; McGrath 42'	Stadium: Hampden Park; Attendance: 41,673; Referee: Dickinson

=== UEFA Champions League ===
==== Second qualifying round ====
21 July 2026 Second qualifying round	Sturm Graz (Austria)	4–0	(Scotland) Heart of Midlothian	Graz, Austria
20:30 CEST	Gorenc Stanković 4'; Mitchell 50'; Weinhandl 53'; Heil 59'	Report		Stadium: Liebenauer Stadium; Attendance: 15,822; Referee: Bogár (Hungary)

28 July 2026 Second qualifying round	Heart of Midlothian (Scotland)	0–2 (0–6 agg.)	(Austria) Sturm Graz	Edinburgh, Scotland
19:45 BST		Report	Seidl 64'; Soglo 68'	Stadium: Tynecastle Park; Attendance: 17,861; Referee: Treimanis (Latvia)

=== UEFA Europa League ===
==== Third qualifying round ====
6 August 2026 Third qualifying round	Benfica (Portugal)	6–1	(Scotland) Heart of Midlothian	Lisbon, Portugal
20:00 WEST	R. Silva 3'; Araújo 23'; Pavlidis 42' (pen.); Prestianni 59'; Durán 87'; Schjelderup 90+4' (pen.)	Report	Renaud 72'	Stadium: Estádio da Luz; Attendance: 60,776; Referee: Barbu (Romania)

13 August 2026 Third qualifying round	Heart of Midlothian (Scotland)	1–1 (2–7 agg.)	(Portugal) Benfica	Edinburgh, Scotland
19:45 BST	Magnússon 77'	Report	Lukébakio 78'	Stadium: Tynecastle Park; Attendance: 17,068; Referee: Van der Eijk (Netherlands)

=== UEFA Conference League ===
==== Play-off round ====
20 August 2026 Play-off round	Heart of Midlothian (Scotland)	2–2	(Austria) Rapid Wien	Edinburgh, Scotland
19:45 BST	Raux-Yao 55' (o.g.); Wilson 62'	Report	Raux-Yao 30'; Wurmbrand 79'	Stadium: Tynecastle Park; Attendance: 18,112; Referee: Lukjančukas (Lithuania)

26 August 2026 Play-off round	Rapid Wien (Austria)	2–2 (a.e.t.) (4–4 agg.) (3–4 p)	(Scotland) Heart of Midlothian	Vienna, Austria
18:45 CEST	Kara 34'; Cvetković 119'	Report	Magnússon (yellow card) 41' (yellow-red card) 76'; Kaboré 79'; Miller 100'	Stadium: Allianz Stadion; Attendance: 23,975; Referee: Masiyev (Azerbaijan)
	Penalties
	Kara (penalty scored); Schaub (penalty scored); Haïdara (penalty missed); Demir (penalty scored); Tilio (penalty missed)		(penalty scored) Miller; (penalty scored) Altena; (penalty scored) Mato; (penalty scored) Kerjota; (penalty missed) McEntee

==== League phase ====
15 October 2026 League phase	Heart of Midlothian (Scotland)	1–1	(Denmark) Nordsjælland	Edinburgh, Scotland
20:00 BST	McEntee 33'	Report	Røjkjær 86'	Stadium: Tynecastle Park; Attendance: 17,368; Referee: Kos (Poland)

22 October 2026 League phase	Trabzonspor (Turkey)	2–0	(Scotland) Heart of Midlothian	Trabzon, Turkey
19:45 TRT	Cabral (yellow card) 9' (yellow-red card) 90+5'; Salah 32' (pen.); Djú 58'	Report		Stadium: Şenol Güneş Sports Complex; Attendance: 28,093; Referee: Visser (Belgium)

5 November 2026 League phase	Thun (Switzerland)	3–1	(Scotland) Heart of Midlothian	Thun, Switzerland
18:45 CET	McCart 22' (o.g.); Labeau 34'; Dursun 56'	Report	Findlay 82'	Stadium: Stockhorn Arena; Attendance: 8,765; Referee: Athanasiou (Cyprus)

26 November 2026 League phase	Heart of Midlothian (Scotland)	–	(France) Monaco	Edinburgh, Scotland
17:45 GMT				Stadium: Tynecastle Park

10 December 2026 League phase	Heart of Midlothian (Scotland)	–	(Bosnia and Herzegovina) Borac Banja Luka	Edinburgh, Scotland
20:00 GMT				Stadium: Tynecastle Park

17 December 2026 League phase	Pafos (Cyprus)	–	(Scotland) Heart of Midlothian	Limassol, Cyprus
22:00 EET				Stadium: Alphamega Stadium (Note: Pafos will play their home matches at Alphamega Stadium, Limassol, instead of their regular stadium, Stelios Kyriakides Stadium, Paphos, which does not meet UEFA requirements.)

== First team player statistics ==
=== Captains ===
Craig Halkett was appointed as Club Captain under new manager Wouter Vrancken. He replaced Lawrence Shankland who left during the close season.

Stephen Kingsley, Harry Milne, Jamie McCart and Blair Spittal were initially appointed as Vice Captains.

No	Pos	Country	Name	No of games	Notes
4	DF	(Scotland)	Halkett	0	Club Captain
3	DF	(Scotland)	Kingsley	6	Vice Captain
5	DF	(Scotland)	McCart	6	Vice Captain
16	MF	(Scotland)	Spittal	5	Vice Captain
17	DF	(Scotland)	Findlay	1	Vice Captain
18	DF	(Scotland)	Milne	7	Vice Captain

Last updated: 21 November 2026
Source: Competitive match reports.
Competitive matches only
Matches started as captain only
Country: FIFA nationality; No.: Squad number; P: Position; Name: Player name; No. Games: Number of games started as captain.

=== Squad information ===
Last updated 21 November 2026

During the 2026–27 campaign, Hearts have used thirty-one players in competitive games. The table below shows the number of appearances and goals scored by each player.

Number	Position	Nation	Name	Totals		Premiership		League Cup		Scottish Cup		Europe	
Number	Position	Nation	Name	Apps	Goals	Apps	Goals	Apps	Goals	Apps	Goals	Apps	Goals
1	GK	(Netherlands) NED	Beau Reus	23	0	13+0	0	3+0	0	0+0	0	7+0	0
2	DF	(Norway) NOR	Christian Borchgrevink	12	1	3+3	0	2+0	1	0+0	0	3+1	0
3	DF	(Scotland) SCO	Stephen Kingsley	12	1	3+2	1	1+1	0	0+0	0	3+2	0
5	DF	(Scotland) SCO	Jamie McCart	24	0	11+1	0	3+0	0	0+0	0	7+2	0
6	DF	(Republic of Ireland) IRL	Oisin McEntee	14	2	6+1	1	0+0	0	0+0	0	7+0	1
7	MF	(Scotland) SCO	Calvin Miller	22	8	9+2	5	2+1	2	0+0	0	8+0	1
8	MF	(Brazil) BRA	Eduardo Ageu	3	0	1+2	0	0+0	0	0+0	0	0+0	0
9	FW	(United States) USA	JJ Williams	12	2	0+8	1	1+0	1	0+0	0	0+3	0
10	FW	(Portugal) POR	Cláudio Braga	24	9	13+0	7	1+1	2	0+0	0	9+0	0
11	FW	(Burkina Faso) BFA	Pierre Landry Kaboré	14	3	2+3	2	0+1	0	0+0	0	3+5	1
12	MF	(France) FRA	Tom Renaud	8	2	1+0	1	1+0	0	0+0	0	3+3	1
15	MF	(Scotland) SCO	Josh McPake	21	3	12+0	3	1+1	0	0+0	0	5+2	0
16	MF	(Scotland) SCO	Blair Spittal	11	0	3+1	0	0+1	0	0+0	0	6+0	0
17	DF	(Scotland) SCO	Stuart Findlay	17	2	8+1	1	2+0	0	0+0	0	5+1	1
18	DF	(Scotland) SCO	Harry Milne	11	0	3+3	0	1+0	0	0+0	0	4+0	0
19	FW	(France) FRA	Sabri Guendouz	18	2	1+8	2	2+1	0	0+0	0	4+2	0
20	MF	(Switzerland) SUI	Leart Kabashi	2	0	1+1	0	0+0	0	0+0	0	0+0	0
21	FW	(Scotland) SCO	James Wilson	20	5	7+4	3	0+2	1	0+0	0	3+4	1
22	MF	(Iceland) ISL	Tómas Bent Magnússon	17	1	5+4	0	3+0	0	0+0	0	1+4	1
23	DF	(Netherlands) NED	Jordi Altena	22	0	12+0	0	1+1	0	0+0	0	7+1	0
24	DF	(Sierra Leone) SLE	MJ Kamson-Kamara	1	0	0+0	0	0+0	0	0+0	0	0+1	0
27	FW	(Faroe Islands) FRO	Aron Benjaminsen	1	0	0+0	0	0+1	0	0+0	0	0+0	0
29	MF	(Albania) ALB	Sabah Kerjota	23	3	7+6	3	3+0	0	0+0	0	1+6	0
31	MF	(England) ENG	Yan Dhanda	6	1	2+1	0	0+3	1	0+0	0	0+0	0
39	MF	(Scotland) SCO	Matthew Gillies	2	0	0+1	0	0+0	0	0+0	0	0+1	0
64	DF	(England) ENG	Malachi Fagan-Walcott	11	0	5+0	0	1+0	0	0+0	0	4+1	0
74	MF	(Uganda) UGA	Rogers Mato	12	2	1+5	0	2+0	2	0+0	0	1+3	0
77	FW	(France) FRA	Amadou Ba-Sy	6	0	2+1	0	1+0	0	0+0	0	0+2	0
78	MF	(France) FRA	Laurent Mendy	18	3	11+1	3	2+0	0	0+0	0	3+1	0
Players transferred or loaned out during the season who made an appearance
1	GK	(Germany) GER	Alexander Schwolow	2	0	0+0	0	0+0	0	0+0	0	2+0	0
89	MF	(Greece) GRE	Alexandros Kyziridis	3	0	0+0	0	0+0	0	0+0	0	3+0	0

- Last updated: 21 November 2026
- Source: Match Reports
- Ordered by Squad Number.

Appearances (starts and substitute appearances) and goals include those in the Scottish Premiership, Scottish Cup, Scottish League Cup, Champions League, Europa League and Conference League.

=== Disciplinary record ===
During the 2026–27 season, Hearts players have been shown forty-nine yellow cards and two red cards. The table below shows the number of cards shown to each player.

Last updated 21 November 2026

Number	Position	Nation	Name	Premiership		League Cup		Scottish Cup		Europe		Total	
Number	Position	Nation	Name	Yellow card	Red card	Yellow card	Red card	Yellow card	Red card	Yellow card	Red card	Yellow card	Red card
2	DF	(Norway)	Christian Borchgrevink	1	0	0	0	0	0	1	0	2	0
3	DF	(Scotland)	Stephen Kingsley	1	0	0	0	0	0	0	0	1	0
5	DF	(Scotland)	Jamie McCart	2	0	0	0	0	0	1	0	3	0
6	MF	(Republic of Ireland)	Oisin McEntee	0	0	0	0	0	0	2	0	2	0
7	MF	(Scotland)	Calvin Miller	2	0	0	0	0	0	1	0	3	0
10	FW	(Portugal)	Cláudio Braga	1	0	0	0	0	0	4	0	5	0
11	FW	(Burkina Faso)	Pierre Landry Kaboré	0	0	0	0	0	0	2	0	2	0
15	MF	(Scotland)	Josh McPake	1	0	0	0	0	0	1	0	2	0
16	MF	(Scotland)	Blair Spittal	0	0	0	0	0	0	1	0	1	0
17	DF	(Scotland)	Stuart Findlay	0	1	0	0	0	0	0	0	0	1
18	DF	(Scotland)	Harry Milne	1	0	0	0	0	0	1	0	2	0
19	FW	(France)	Sabri Guendouz	1	0	0	0	0	0	0	0	1	0
20	MF	(Switzerland)	Leart Kabashi	1	0	0	0	0	0	0	0	1	0
21	FW	(Scotland)	James Wilson	0	0	1	0	0	0	1	0	2	0
22	MF	(Iceland)	Tómas Bent Magnússon	0	0	0	0	0	0	2	1	2	1
23	DF	(Netherlands)	Jordi Altena	2	0	0	0	0	0	0	0	2	0
29	MF	(Albania)	Sabah Kerjota	2	0	0	0	0	0	0	0	2	0
31	MF	(England)	Yan Dhanda	2	0	0	0	0	0	0	0	2	0
64	DF	(England)	Malachi Fagan-Walcott	1	0	0	0	0	0	0	0	1	0
74	MF	(Uganda)	Rogers Mato	1	0	0	0	0	0	0	0	1	0
77	FW	(France)	Amadou Ba-Sy	1	0	0	0	0	0	1	0	2	0
78	MF	(France)	Laurent Mendy	0	0	0	0	0	0	1	0	1	0
Total				20	1	1	0	0	0	19	1	40	2

=== Goal scorers ===
Last updated 21 November 2026

Place	Position	Nation	Name	Premiership	League Cup	Scottish Cup	Europe	Total
1	FW	(Portugal)	Cláudio Braga	7	2	0	0	9
2	MF	(Scotland)	Calvin Miller	5	2	0	1	8
3	FW	(Scotland)	James Wilson	3	1	0	1	5
4	MF	(Scotland)	Josh McPake	3	0	0	0	3
4	MF	(France)	Laurent Mendy	3	0	0	0	3
4	MF	(Albania)	Sabah Kerjota	3	0	0	0	3
5	MF	(France)	Tom Renaud	1	0	0	1	2
5	MF	(Uganda)	Rogers Mato	0	2	0	0	2
5	DF	(Republic of Ireland)	Oisin McEntee	1	0	0	1	2
5	DF	(Scotland)	Stuart Findlay	1	0	0	1	2
5	MF	(France)	Sabri Guendouz	2	0	0	0	2
5	FW	(Burkina Faso)	Pierre Landry Kaboré	2	0	0	0	2
6	MF	(Iceland)	Tómas Bent Magnússon	0	0	0	1	1
6	DF	(Norway)	Christian Borchgrevink	0	1	0	0	1
6	FW	(Burkina Faso)	Pierre Landry Kaboré	0	0	0	1	1
6	FW	(United States)	JJ Williams	0	1	0	0	1
6	MF	(England)	Yan Dhanda	0	1	0	0	1
6	DF	(Scotland)	Stephen Kingsley	1	0	0	0	1
Own goals				2	0	0	1	3
Total				34	10	0	8	52

=== Clean sheets ===
No	Pos	Nat	Name	Premiership	League Cup	Scottish Cup	Europe	Total
1	GK	(Netherlands)	Beau Reus	4	1	0	0	5
25	GK	(Germany)	Alexander Schwolow	0	0	0	0	0
28	GK	(Scotland)	Zander Clark	0	0	0	0	0
30	GK	(Scotland)	Ryan Fulton	0	0	0	0	0
34	GK	(Scotland)	Kieran Wright	0	0	0	0	0
Total				4	1	0	0	5

Last updated: 21 November 2026
Source: Match reports in Results

== Team statistics ==
=== League table ===
Pos	Team	Pld	W	D	L	GF	GA	GD	Pts	Qualification or relegation (Note: Teams play each other three times (33 matches), before the league is split into two groups (the top six and the bottom six).)
2	Rangers	13	9	3	1	23	10	+13	30	Qualification for the Conference League second qualifying round (Note: The winners of the 2026–27 Scottish Cup will qualify for the Europa League. If the cup winners also win the league, the spot reserved for the cup winners (Europa League first qualifying round) will pass to the second-placed team, and the spots for the Conference League second qualifying round will move down one league position.)
3	Falkirk	14	7	3	4	22	15	+7	24	Qualification for the Conference League second qualifying round
4	Heart of Midlothian	13	7	2	4	34	22	+12	23	
5	Dundee United	13	5	5	3	21	17	+4	20	
6	St Johnstone	14	4	5	5	18	22	−4	17	

Updated to match(es) played on 21 November 2026. Source:
Rules for classification: 1) Points; 2) Goal difference; 3) Goals scored; 4) Head-to-head points; 5) Head-to-head goal difference; 6) Play-off (only if deciding champion, UEFA competition qualification, second stage group allocation, or relegation).

=== League summary ===
Round	1	2	3^{1}	4	5	6	3^{1}	7	8	9	10	11	12^{2}	14	15
Ground	A	H	A	H	A	H	A	A	H	A	A	H	A	H	A
Result	L	W	P	W	W	W	L	D	W	L	W	D	P	L	W
Position	9	4	5	3	3	2	3	3	3	3	3	3	3	4	4

Updated to match(es) played on 21 November 2026. Source: Premiership Fixtures
A = Away; H = Home; W = Win; D = Draw; L = Loss; P = Postponed
Notes:
- ^{1} Matchday 3 (v. Falkirk) was postponed due to Hearts' participation in the Conference League play-off round.
- ^{2} Matchday 12 (v. Dundee United) was postponed due to Hearts' participation in the League Cup semi-finals.

=== UEFA Conference League table ===
Pos	Team	Pld	W	D	L	GF	GA	GD	Pts
30	(Cyprus) Pafos	3	0	1	2	3	7	−4	1
31	(Spain) Getafe	3	0	1	2	3	7	−4	1
32	(Scotland) Heart of Midlothian	3	0	1	2	2	6	−4	1
33	(Finland) KuPS	3	0	1	2	2	6	−4	1
34	(Denmark) Midtjylland	3	0	1	2	2	8	−6	1

Updated to match(es) played on 5 November 2026. Source: UEFA
Rules for classification: League phase tiebreakers

=== UEFA Conference League summary ===
Round	1	2	3
Ground	H	A	A
Result	D	L	L
Position	19	28	32

Updated to match(es) played on 21 November 2026. Source: UCL League Phase Fixtures
A = Away; H = Home; W = Win; D = Draw; L = Loss

=== Management statistics ===
Last updated 21 November 2026

Name	From	To	P	W	D	L	Win% (Note: Win% is the percentage of matches won rounded to two decimal places.)
Wouter Vrancken	21 July 2026		25	9	6	10	36.00

=== Home attendances ===
Last updated on 21 November 2026

Win Draw Loss

Comp	Date	Score	Opponent	Attendance
Champions League	28 July 2026	0–2	Sturm Graz	17,861
Scottish Premiership	9 August 2026	4–0	Dundee United	18,602
Europa League	13 August 2026	1–1	Benfica	17,068
League Cup	16 August 2026	6–2	Inverness Caledonian Thistle	15,327
Conference League	20 August 2026	2–2	Rapid Wien	18,112
Scottish Premiership	29 August 2026	2–1	St Johnstone	18,714
Scottish Premiership	6 September 2026	2–1	Dundee	18,721
Scottish Premiership	10 October 2026	5–0	St Mirren	18,582
Conference League	15 October 2026	1–1	Nordsjælland	17,368
Scottish Premiership	28 October 2026	2–2	Rangers	18,692
Scottish Premiership	8 November 2026	2–5	Falkirk	18,692
			Total attendance:	197,807
			Total league attendance:	112,071
			Average league attendance:	18,679

Last updated: 21 November 2026
Source: Match reports in Results

== Club ==
=== Management ===
On 17 June 2026, with three years left on their contracts Derek McInnes, Alan Archibald and Paul Sheerin left their respective positions as Head and Assistant coaches. With compensation agreed they joined fellow Scottish Premiership side Rangers. Set piece coach Ross Grant also departed during the close season, joining Celtic.

On 25 June 2026, Wouter Vrancken was appointed as Head Coach on a two-year contract. Vrancken's assistant managers were subsequently announced as Tim Smolders and Céderique Tulleners. In July, Liam Ross joined the coaching staff as set plays coach.

==== First team staff ====
Name	Role
Head Coach	Wouter Vrancken
Assistant Coach	Tim Smolders
Assistant Coach	Céderique Tulleners
Set Plays Coach	Liam Ross
Goalkeeping Coach	Gordon Marshall
Goalkeeping Coach Analyst	Jamie MacDonald

==== Board ====
Name	Role
Chairman	Calum Paterson
Chief Executive Officer	Andrew McKinlay
Non Executive Director	James Anderson
Non Executive Director	Claire Hammond
Non Executive Director	Ralph Findlay
Non Executive Director	James Franks
Foundation of Hearts chairman	Gerry Mallon
Chief Financial Officer	Euan Forbes

=== Deaths ===
The following players and people associated with the club died over the course of the season: former winger Bobby Ross, former full back George Peden, former club captain Don Murray and striker Darren Beckford.

=== International selection ===
Over the course of the season, a number of the Hearts squad were called up for international duty. Josh McPake and James Wilson were called up to represent Scotland; Sabah Kerjota to represent Albania, Pierre Landry Kaboré to represent Burkina Faso and MJ Kamson-Kamara to represent Sierra Leone.

In addition, Liam McFarlane was called up to Scotland's under-21 squad and Aron Benjaminsen to the Faroe Islands under-21 squad.

== Transfers ==
=== Players in ===
Player	From	Fee
(Scotland) Stuart Findlay	(England) Oxford United	Free
(Scotland) Josh McPake	(Scotland) St Johnstone	Free
(Uganda) Rogers Mato	(North Macedonia) Vardar	Free
(Sierra Leone) MJ Kamson-Kamara	(England) Lincoln City	Compensation
(Scotland) Calvin Miller	(Scotland) Falkirk	Undisclosed
(France) Amadou Ba-Sy	(France) FC Rouen	Undisclosed
(England) Malachi Fagan-Walcott	(England) York City	Undisclosed
(France) Sabri Guendouz	(Belgium) Beerschot	Undisclosed
(France) Tom Renaud	(France) Versailles	Free
(Scotland) Cormac Daly	(England) Nottingham Forest	Free
(Netherlands) Beau Reus	(Belgium) Beveren	Free
(France) Laurent Mendy	(England) Forest Green Rovers	Undisclosed
(Scotland) Kieran Wright	(Scotland) Rangers	Free
(United States) JJ Williams	(United States) Rhode Island	Undisclosed
(Faroe Islands) Aron Benjaminsen	(Faroe Islands) Víkingur Gøta	Undisclosed
(Switzerland) Leart Kabashi	(Switzerland) Grasshopper Club	Undisclosed

=== Players out ===
Player	To	Fee
(Scotland) Lawrence Shankland	(Scotland) Rangers	Free
(Democratic Republic of the Congo) Beni Baningime		Free
(Scotland) Alan Forrest	(Scotland) Dundee	Free
(England) Frankie Kent	(England) Oxford United	Free
(Scotland) Lewis Neilson	(Scotland) Falkirk	Free
(Scotland) Bobby McLuckie	(Scotland) Greenock Morton	Free
(Scotland) Gregor Crookston	(Scotland) Hamilton Academical	Free
(Wales) Kai Smutek	(Scotland) Hamilton Academical	Free
(Austria) Michael Steinwender	(Germany) VfL Bochum	Undisclosed
(Kazakhstan) Islam Chesnokov	(Kazakhstan) FC Tobol	Undisclosed
(Australia) Cammy Devlin	(Scotland) Rangers	Free
(Scotland) Craig Gordon	Retired	
(Scotland) Macaulay Tait	(Scotland) St Johnstone	Undisclosed
(Germany) Alexander Schwolow	(Germany) Mainz 05	Undisclosed
(Greece) Alexandros Kyziridis	(Turkey) Çorum	Undisclosed
(Scotland) Alfie Osborne	(England) Chelsea	Undisclosed
(Norway) Sander Kartum	(Norway) Aalesund	Free

=== Loans out ===
Player	To	Fee
(Costa Rica) Kenneth Vargas	(Greece) Kalamata	Loan
(Scotland) Harry Stone	(Scotland) Ayr United	Loan
(Australia) Calem Nieuwenhof	(Australia) Perth Glory	Loan
(Scotland) Callum Sandilands	(Scotland) Greenock Morton	Loan
(Scotland) Jack Lyon	(Scotland) Bonnyrigg Rose (Note: Hearts Signed Cooperation Loan Agreements with Bonnyrigg Rose, Edinburgh City, Stenhousemuir and East Fife.)	Co-operation loan
(Scotland) Tommy North	(Scotland) Edinburgh City	Co-operation loan
(Scotland) Stanley Wilson	(Scotland) Edinburgh City	Co-operation loan
(Scotland) Matthew Gillies	(Scotland) Stenhousemuir	Co-operation loan
(Scotland) Gus Stevenson	(Scotland) Stenhousemuir	Co-operation loan
(Scotland) Liam McFarlane	(Scotland) Partick Thistle	Loan
(Scotland) Cormac Daly	(Scotland) Arbroath	Loan
(Scotland) Adam Forrester	(Scotland) Ross County	Loan
(Scotland) Connor Dow	(Scotland) East Fife	Co-operation loan
(Sierra Leone) MJ Kamson-Kamara	(Scotland) Kilmarnock	Loan

== See also ==
- List of Heart of Midlothian F.C. seasons
