= 2026–27 Scottish Premiership =

130th season of top-tier football league in Scotland

Scottish Premiership
- Season: 2026–27
- Dates: 31 July 2026 – 16 May 2027
- Matches: 81
- Goals: 243 (3 per match)
- Top goalscorer: Camilo Durán; Jacob Murrell (8 goals)
- Biggest home win: Celtic 7–1 Heart of Midlothian (18 October 2026)
- Biggest away win: Dundee 0–8 Heart of Midlothian (21 November 2026)
- Highest scoring: Celtic 7–1 Heart of Midlothian (18 October 2026); Dundee 0–8 Heart of Midlothian (21 November 2026)
- Longest winning run: Celtic; Falkirk; Rangers (6 games)
- Longest unbeaten run: Rangers (11 games)
- Longest winless run: Hibernian (8 games)
- Longest losing run: Motherwell (6 games)
- Highest attendance: 59,650; Celtic 0–1 Rangers; 20 September 2026
- Lowest attendance: 4,027; St Johnstone 2–2 Motherwell; 28 October 2026
- Total attendance: 1,356,369
- Average attendance: 17,169
- All statistics correct as of 21 November 2026.

The 2026–27 Scottish Premiership (known as the William Hill Premiership for sponsorship reasons) is the 14th season of the Scottish Premiership, the highest division of Scottish football, and the 130th edition overall of the top national league competition, not including one cancelled due to World War II. The season began on 31 July 2026.

Twelve teams are contesting the league: Aberdeen, Celtic, Dundee, Dundee United, Falkirk, Heart of Midlothian, Hibernian, Kilmarnock, Motherwell, Rangers, St Johnstone and St Mirren.

== Teams ==
The following teams changed division after the 2025–26 season.

Promoted from the 2025–26 Championship

- St Johnstone

Relegated to the 2026–27 Championship

- Livingston

=== Stadium and locations ===
2026–27 Scottish Premiership
Team locations:
1 Aberdeen
2 Celtic
3 Dundee
4 Dundee United
5 Falkirk
6 Heart of Midlothian
7 Hibernian
8 Kilmarnock
9 Motherwell
10 Rangers
11 St Johnstone
12 St Mirren

Team	Stadium	Capacity	Photo
Aberdeen	Pittodrie Stadium	19,274	
Celtic	Celtic Park	60,411	
Dundee	Dens Park	11,775	
Dundee United	Tannadice Park	14,223	
Falkirk	Falkirk Stadium	7,937	
Heart of Midlothian	Tynecastle Park	19,852	
Hibernian	Easter Road	20,421	
Kilmarnock	Rugby Park	15,003	
Motherwell	Fir Park	13,677	
Rangers	Ibrox Stadium	51,700	
St Johnstone	McDiarmid Park	10,696	
St Mirren	St Mirren Park	8,000	

=== Personnel and kits ===
Team	Manager	Captain	Kit manufacturer	Shirt sponsor (front)	Shirt sponsor (back)	Shirt sponsor (sleeve)	Shorts sponsor
Aberdeen	(Liechtenstein) Mario Frick	(Scotland) Kevin Nisbet	Macron	Texo Group	MaxAmaze, EIS Waste Services	RAM Tubulars	Texo Group
Celtic	(Northern Ireland) Martin O'Neill	(Scotland) Callum McGregor	Adidas	Dafabet	None	Celtic FC Foundation	None
Dundee	(Scotland) Steven Pressley	(Scotland) Simon Murray	Macron	Crown Engineering Services	MKM Building Supplies, John Clark BMW	GA Vans	DrainBlitz
Dundee United	(Republic of Ireland) Jim Goodwin	(Scotland) Ross Graham	Erreà	Quinn Casino	JF Kegs, Norman Jamieson Ltd	Trade-Mart	Paint-Tec Accident Repair Centre
Falkirk	(Scotland) John McGlynn	(Scotland) Coll Donaldson	O'Neills	McEwan Fraser Legal	Maniqui Nightclub (Home); Horizon Reinforcing & Crane Hire (Away)	Total Tickets	Water & Pipeline Services
Heart of Midlothian	(Belgium) Wouter Vrancken	(Scotland) Craig Halkett	Hummel	Stellar Omada	FanHub, loveholidays	ASC Edinburgh Ltd	None
Hibernian	(Netherlands) Marink Reedijk	(Germany) Felix Passlack	Reebok	Bevvy.com	Whisky Row, Dunedin IT	SBK	Capital Credit Union
Kilmarnock	(Scotland) Neil McCann	(Scotland) Greg Kiltie	Hummel	James Frew Ltd	James Frew Ltd, Blackwood Plant Hire	Redrock Automation	A&L Mechanical
Motherwell	(Sweden) Alfred Johansson	(Scotland) Paul McGinn	Macron	Lime	Fire Suppression Scotland, Kwiff	DX Home Improvements	TCL
Rangers	(Scotland) Derek McInnes	(Scotland) Lawrence Shankland	Umbro	Unibet	SEKO Logistics, Pipeline Energy Solutions	BOXT Boilers	None
St Johnstone	(Finland) Simo Valakari	(Scotland) Jason Holt	Puma	MandM	Sidey, A&B Taxis	AIIR Environmental	Saints in the Community
St Mirren	(Scotland) Craig McLeish	(Scotland) Marcus Fraser	Macron	Consilium	Ultimate Home Solutions, Macklin Motors	Gennaro Glass & Glazing	KPP Chartered Accountants

=== Managerial changes ===
Team	Outgoing manager	Manner of departure	Date of vacancy	Position in table	Incoming manager	Date of appointment
Motherwell	(Denmark) Jens Berthel Askou	Joined Toulouse	21 May 2026	Pre-season	(Sweden) Alfred Johansson	18 June 2026
Rangers	(Germany) Danny Röhl	Joined Red Bull Salzburg	17 June 2026	Pre-season	(Scotland) Derek McInnes	17 June 2026
Heart of Midlothian	(Scotland) Derek McInnes	Joined Rangers	17 June 2026	Pre-season	(Belgium) Wouter Vrancken	25 June 2026
Hibernian	(Scotland) David Gray	Sacked	16 September 2026	9th	(Netherlands) Marink Reedijk	24 September 2026
Aberdeen	(Northern Ireland) Stephen Robinson	Sacked	9 November 2026	11th	(Liechtenstein) Mario Frick	15 November 2026

== Format ==
In the initial phase of the season, the 12 teams will play a round-robin tournament whereby each team plays each one of the other teams three times. After 33 games, the league splits into two sections of six teams, with each team playing each other in that section once. The league attempts to balance the fixture list so that teams in the same section play each other twice at home and twice away, but sometimes this is impossible. A total of 228 matches will be played, with 38 matches played by each team.

== League table ==
Pos	Team	Pld	W	D	L	GF	GA	GD	Pts	Qualification or relegation (Note: Teams play each other three times (33 matches), before the league is split into two groups (the top six and the bottom six).)
1	Celtic	14	11	1	2	32	11	+21	34	Qualification for the Champions League second qualifying round
2	Rangers	13	9	3	1	23	10	+13	30	Qualification for the Conference League second qualifying round (Note: The winners of the 2026–27 Scottish Cup will qualify for the Europa League. If the cup winners also win the league, the spot reserved for the cup winners (Europa League first qualifying round) will pass to the second-placed team, and the spots for the Conference League second qualifying round will move down one league position.)
3	Falkirk	14	7	3	4	22	15	+7	24	Qualification for the Conference League second qualifying round
4	Heart of Midlothian	13	7	2	4	34	22	+12	23	
5	Dundee United	13	5	5	3	21	17	+4	20	
6	St Johnstone	14	4	5	5	18	22	−4	17	
7	Dundee	13	5	2	6	18	23	−5	17	
8	Aberdeen	13	4	2	7	16	20	−4	14	
9	St Mirren	14	4	2	8	13	26	−13	14	
10	Motherwell	14	3	4	7	16	23	−7	13	
11	Hibernian	13	3	2	8	15	21	−6	11	Qualification for the Premiership play-off final
12	Kilmarnock	14	2	3	9	15	33	−18	9	Relegation to the Championship

Updated to match(es) played on 21 November 2026. Source:
Rules for classification: 1) Points; 2) Goal difference; 3) Goals scored; 4) Head-to-head points; 5) Head-to-head goal difference; 6) Play-off (only if deciding champion, UEFA competition qualification, second stage group allocation, or relegation).

== Results ==
=== Matches 1–33 ===
In Matches 1–22, all teams play each other twice, once at home and once away. And in Matches 23–33, all teams play each other once, either home or away.

Home \ Away	ABE	CEL	DND	DUN	FAL	HOM	HIB	KIL	MOT	RAN	STJ	STM	ABE	CEL	DND	DUN	FAL	HOM	HIB	KIL	MOT	RAN	STJ	STM
Aberdeen	—	20 Dec	28 Nov	5 Dec	0–1	2–1	0–4	0–0	30 Dec	0–1	0–1	3–1	—	—	—	—	3 Feb	9 Jan	—	10 Apr	—	30 Jan	27 Feb	13 Mar
Celtic	3–0	—	1–0	2–2	2–1	7–1	13 Jan	1–0	26 Dec	0–1	5 Dec	4–1	20 Mar	—	9 Jan	10 Apr	31 Jan	13 Feb	—	—	—	27 Feb	—	—
Dundee	2–0	2 Dec	—	2 Jan	5 Dec	0–8	1–2	3–1	2–1	2–2	1–1	26 Dec	23 Jan	—	—	—	—	—	30 Jan	27 Feb	20 Mar	10 Apr	13 Feb	—
Dundee United	3–2	30 Dec	0–2	—	1–1	12 Jan	1–0	19 Dec	1–1	1–1	28 Nov	12 Dec	20 Feb	—	13 Mar	—	3 Apr	—	3 Feb	—	—	9 Jan	—	—
Falkirk	12 Dec	2–0	1–2	26 Dec	—	2–1	2 Jan	3–0	2 Dec	1–2	2–1	0–2	—	—	20 Feb	—	—	23 Jan	—	20 Mar	—	13 Feb	—	10 Apr
Heart of Midlothian	2 Dec	29 Nov	2–1	4–0	2–5	—	27 Dec	2 Jan	13 Dec	2–2	2–1	5–0	—	—	3 Feb	27 Feb	—	—	—	—	—	20 Mar	3 Apr	30 Jan
Hibernian	1–1	1–2	24 Nov	0–4	1–2	1–3	—	0–1	1–2	7 Dec	19 Dec	30 Dec	13 Feb	20 Feb	—	—	13 Mar	10 Apr	—	23 Jan	9 Jan	—	—	—
Kilmarnock	2–4	1–5	12 Dec	0–4	30 Dec	1–1	2 Dec	—	3–2	26 Dec	2–2	0–1	—	3 Apr	—	13 Feb	—	13 Mar	—	—	30 Jan	—	—	9 Jan
Motherwell	0–4	0–2	19 Dec	3–0	0–0	0–2	28 Nov	5 Dec	—	1–2	2 Jan	1–0	3 Apr	3 Feb	—	23 Jan	27 Feb	20 Feb	—	—	—	—	—	—
Rangers	24 Nov	3 Jan	30 Dec	2 Dec	28 Nov	20 Dec	1–2	3–1	1–0	—	4–0	1–0	—	—	—	—	—	—	3 Apr	3 Feb	13 Mar	—	23 Jan	20 Feb
St Johnstone	26 Dec	0–1	2–1	1–1	1–1	30 Dec	2–1	4–3	2–2	13 Jan	—	2 Dec	—	13 Mar	—	30 Jan	9 Jan	—	20 Mar	20 Feb	10 Apr	—	—	—
St Mirren	3 Jan	1–2	2–1	0–3	19 Dec	5 Dec	1–1	28 Nov	3–3	0–2	1–0	—	—	24 Jan	3 Apr	20 Mar	—	—	27 Feb	—	13 Feb	—	3 Feb	—

Updated to match(es) played on 21 November 2026. Source:
Legend: Blue = home team win; Yellow = draw; Red = away team win.

=== Matches 34–38 ===
After 33 matches, the league splits into two sections of six teams, i.e. the top six and the bottom six, with the teams playing every other team in their section once (either at home or away). The exact matches are determined by the position of the teams in the league table at the time of the split.

== Season statistics ==
As of 21 November 2026

=== Top scorers ===
Rank	Player	Club	Goals
1	(Colombia) Camilo Durán	Celtic	8
1	(United States) Jacob Murrell	Falkirk	8
3	(Portugal) Cláudio Braga	Heart of Midlothian	7
3	(Czech Republic) Ryan Naderi	Rangers	7
5	(Scotland) Kevin Nisbet	Aberdeen	6
5	(Sweden) Benjamin Nygren	Celtic	6
5	(Scotland) Josh Fowler	St Johnstone	6
8	(Australia) Zac Sapsford	Dundee United	5
8	(Scotland) Calvin Miller	Heart of Midlothian	5

=== Hat-tricks ===
Player	For	Against	Score	Date	Ref.
(Denmark) Kasper Høgh	Celtic	Kilmarnock	1–5 (A)	9 August 2026	

=== Clean sheets ===
Rank	Player	Club	Clean sheets
1	(Croatia) Ivor Pandur	Rangers	6
2	(England) Jack Walton	Dundee United	4
2	(Scotland) Scott Bain	Falkirk	4
2	(Netherlands) Beau Reus	Heart of Midlothian	4
5	(Finland) Viljami Sinisalo	Celtic	3
5	(New Zealand) Alex Paulsen	Motherwell	3
5	(Australia) Jacob Chapman	St Mirren	3
8	(Germany) Marius Müller	Aberdeen	2
8	(England) Sam Johnstone	Celtic	2
8	(Canada) Owen Goodman	Dundee	2
8	(Poland) Max Stryjek	Kilmarnock	2

== Awards ==
Month	Manager of the Month		Player of the Month	
Month	Manager	Club	Player	Club
August	(Scotland) Craig McLeish	St Mirren	(Colombia) Camilo Durán	Celtic
September	(Scotland) Derek McInnes	Rangers	(South Africa) Olwethu Makhanya	Rangers
October	(Scotland) John McGlynn	Falkirk	(United States) Jacob Murrell	Falkirk
November				
December				
January				
February				
March				
April				
