= Pierre Landry Kaboré =

Burkinabé footballer (born 2001)

- Kaboré in 2026

Personal information
- Date of birth: 5 July 2001 (age 25)
- Place of birth: Burkina Faso
- Height: 1.80 m (5 ft 11 in)
- Positions: Winger; forward

Team information
- Current team: Heart of Midlothian
- Number: 11

Senior career*
| Years | Team | Apps | (Gls) |
- ASF Bobo
| 2020–2021 | Salitas | | |
| 2021–2022 | AS SONABEL | | |
| 2022–2024 | SOL | | |
| 2024–2025 | Narva Trans | 44 | (23) |
| 2025– | Heart of Midlothian | 30 | (7) |

International career^{‡}
| 2025– | Burkina Faso | 12 | (7) |
- * Club domestic league appearances and goals as of 22 November 2026 ‡ National team caps and goals as of 5 June 2026

Pierre Landry Kaboré (born 5 July 2001) is a Burkinabé professional footballer who plays for Scottish Premiership side Heart of Midlothian, as a winger or forward. He has also represented Burkina Faso at international level.

Kaboré previously played for ASF Bobo, Salitas, AS SONABEL, SOL and Narva Trans.

== Club career ==
Kaboré started his career with Burkinabé side ASF Bobo. Following his stint there, he signed for Salitas in 2021. One year later, he signed for AS SONABEL. Subsequently, he signed for Ivorian side SOL in 2022.

Ahead of the 2024 season, he signed for Estonian side Narva Trans. Burkinabé news website 226foot.com wrote in 2025 that he was a "has been a key figure for his side" while playing for the club.

In August 2025, he signed for Scottish Premiership side Heart of Midlothian. He scored his first two goals for Hearts in a 4-0 victory over Dundee.

== International career ==
Kaboré is a Burkina Faso international. On 2 June 2025, he debuted for the Burkina Faso national football team during a 0–2 away friendly loss to the Tunisia national football team. On 12 October 2025, he scored his first international goals by netting a hat-trick in a 3–1 win over Ethiopia during the 2026 FIFA World Cup qualification.

== Career statistics ==
As of 22 November 2026

Appearances and goals by club, season and competition
| Club | Season | League | | | National cup (Note: Includes Norwegian Football Cup, Scottish Cup) | | League cup (Note: Includes Scottish League Cup) | | Europe | | Total | |
| Club | Season | Division | Apps | Goals | Apps | Goals | Apps | Goals | Apps | Goals | Apps | Goals |
|---|---|---|---|---|---|---|---|---|---|---|---|---|
| Narva Trans | 2024 | Premium Liiga | 29 | 11 | 1 | 0 | – | | – | | 30 | 11 |
| Narva Trans | 2025 | Premium Liiga | 15 | 12 | 5 | 10 | – | | – | | 20 | 22 |
| Narva Trans | Total | | 44 | 23 | 6 | 10 | – | | – | | 50 | 33 |
| Heart of Midlothian | 2025–26 | Scottish Premiership | 25 | 5 | 1 | 0 | 1 | 0 | 0 | 0 | 27 | 5 |
| Heart of Midlothian | 2026–27 | Scottish Premiership | 5 | 2 | 0 | 0 | 1 | 0 | 8 | 1 | 14 | 3 |
| Heart of Midlothian | Total | | 30 | 7 | 1 | 0 | 2 | 0 | 8 | 1 | 41 | 8 |
| Career total | | | 74 | 30 | 7 | 10 | 2 | 0 | 8 | 1 | 91 | 41 |

=== International ===
As of match played on 5 June 2026

Appearances and goals by national team and year
| National team | Year | Apps | Goals |
|---|---|---|---|
| Burkina Faso | 2025 | 10 | 6 |
| Burkina Faso | 2026 | 2 | 1 |
| Total | | 12 | 7 |

Scores and results list Burkina Faso's goal tally first, score column indicates score after each Kaboré goal.

List of international goals scored by Pierre Landry Kaboré
| No. | Date | Venue | Opponent | Score | Result | Competition |
|---|---|---|---|---|---|---|
| 1 | 12 October 2025 | Stade du 4 Août, Ouagadougou, Burkina Faso | Ethiopia | 1–0 | 3–1 | 2026 FIFA World Cup qualification |
| 2 | 12 October 2025 | Stade du 4 Août, Ouagadougou, Burkina Faso | Ethiopia | 2–0 | 3–1 | 2026 FIFA World Cup qualification |
| 3 | 12 October 2025 | Stade du 4 Août, Ouagadougou, Burkina Faso | Ethiopia | 3–1 | 3–1 | 2026 FIFA World Cup qualification |
| 4 | 14 November 2025 | El Bachir Stadium, Mohammedia, Morocco | Niger | 1–1 | 3–2 | Friendly |
| 5 | 14 November 2025 | El Bachir Stadium, Mohammedia, Morocco | Niger | 2–1 | 3–2 | Friendly |
| 6 | 14 November 2025 | El Bachir Stadium, Mohammedia, Morocco | Niger | 3–2 | 3–2 | Friendly |
| 7 | 28 March 2026 | Stade du 4 Août, Ouagadougou, Burkina Faso | Guinea-Bissau | 1–0 | 5–0 | Friendly |

== Honours ==
Individual

- Meistriliiga Player of the Month: May 2025
