= Beau Reus =

Dutch footballer (born 2001)

- Reus in 2026

Personal information
- Date of birth: 30 October 2001 (age 25)
- Place of birth: Oudorp, Netherlands
- Height: 1.98 m (6 ft 6 in)
- Position: Goalkeeper

Team information
- Current team: Heart of Midlothian
- Number: 1

Youth career
- Kolping Boys
- –2015: FC Volendam
- 2015–2020: AZ

Senior career*
Years	Team	Apps	(Gls)
2020–2022	Jong AZ	32	(0)
2021–2022	AZ	0	(0)
2022–2026	Beveren	121	(0)
2026–	Heart of Midlothian	12	(0)
- * Club domestic league appearances and goals as of 22 November 2026

Beau Reus (Dutch pronunciation: [ˈboː ˈrøːs]; born 30 October 2001) is a Dutch professional footballer who plays for Scottish Premiership side Heart of Midlothian, as a goalkeeper. Born in Oudorp, he began his career with local youth side VV Kolping Boys, before joining FC Volendam and the AZ youth academy.

Reus made his professional debut for Jong AZ in 2020, before spells with AZ and Beveren.

== Career ==
Reus began his career with local youth side VV Kolping Boys, before joining FC Volendam and the AZ youth academy. He made his professional debut with Jong AZ in a 6–1 Eerste Divisie loss to NAC Breda on 29 August 2020.

On 20 July 2021, Reus signed his first professional contract with AZ until 2023. In addition, he was promoted to the first team from the 2021–22 season.

On 19 July 2022, Reus signed a two-year contract with Beveren in Belgium. He made his debut against Royal Excelsior on 20 August 2022.

On 17 July 2026, Reus joined Scottish Premiership club Heart of Midlothian on a three-year deal. He made his debut for the club, starting the whole game, in a 4–0 loss against Sturm Graz in the first leg of the UEFA Champions League's second qualifying round. Reus made his league debut for Hearts, starting the whole game, in a 2–1 loss against Aberdeen in the opening game of the season. He played in both legs against Rapid Wien in the play-off round of UEFA Conference League, which both legs ended up in a 2–2 draw (4–4 on aggregate), leading to penalty shootout and saved both penalties from Moulaye Haidara and Marco Tilio, resulting in the club qualifying for the UEFA Conference League phase.

== Career statistics ==
As of 22 November 2026

Appearances and goals by club, season and competition
Club	Season	League			National cup (Note: Includes Norwegian Football Cup, Scottish Cup)		League cup (Note: Includes Scottish League Cup)		Europe		Total	
Club	Season	Division	Apps	Goals	Apps	Goals	Apps	Goals	Apps	Goals	Apps	Goals
Waasland-Beveren / SK Beveren	2022–23	Challenger Pro League	31	0	2	0	–		–		33	0
Waasland-Beveren / SK Beveren	2023–24	Challenger Pro League	30	0	0	0	–		–		30	0
Waasland-Beveren / SK Beveren	2024–25	Challenger Pro League	30	0	1	0	–		–		31	0
Waasland-Beveren / SK Beveren	2025–26	Challenger Pro League	32	0	0	0	–		–		32	0
Waasland-Beveren / SK Beveren	Total		123	0	3	2	–		–		126	0
Heart of Midlothian	2026–27	Scottish Premiership	12	0	0	0	2	0	7	0	21	0
Heart of Midlothian	Total		12	0	0	0	2	0	7	0	21	0
Career total			135	0	3	0	2	0	7	0	147	0
