= MJ Kamson-Kamara =

Sierra Leonean footballer (born 2006)

- Kamson-Kamara in 2026

Personal information
- Full name: Michael-John Valentino Kamson-Kamara
- Date of birth: 14 February 2006 (age 20)
- Place of birth: Farnborough, London, England
- Height: 6 ft 1 in (1.85 m)
- Position: Centre back

Team information
- Current team: Kilmarnock (on loan from Heart of Midlothian)
- Number: 3

Youth career
- Bromley
- –2023: Lincoln City

Senior career*
Years	Team	Apps	(Gls)
2023–2026	Lincoln City	0	(0)
2023–2024	→ Barwell (loan)	30	(2)
2024–2025	→ Peterborough Sports (loan)	19	(0)
2025–2026	→ Glentoran (loan)	23	(3)
2026–	Heart of Midlothian	0	(0)
2026–	→ Kilmarnock (loan)	6	(0)

International career^{‡}
2026–	Sierra Leone	2	(0)
- * Club domestic league appearances and goals as of 17:12, 21 November 2026 (UTC) ‡ National team caps and goals as of 09:39, 29 September 2026 (UTC)

Michael-John Valentino Kamson-Kamara (born 14 February 2006) is a professional footballer who plays for Scottish Premiership club Kilmarnock on loan from Scottish Premiership club Heart of Midlothian, as a defender. Born in England, he represents the Sierra Leone national team.

== Club career ==
=== Lincoln City ===
Kamson-Kamara started at Bromley up to U16 level before working with the XYZ Academy. He signed his first professional contract at Lincoln City on 23 February 2023, signing a long-term contract. He had a spell on loan at Barwell during the 2023–24 season. On 2 August 2024, he joined Peterborough Sports on loan for the season. Whilst on loan for Peterborough Sports, he would make his Lincoln City debut, coming off the bench in the EFL Trophy against Grimsby Town. Having returned from his loan in February 2025, he would return to Peterborough Sports on 8 March 2025 for the remainder of the season.

On 29 August 2025, he joined NIFL Premiership club Glentoran on loan for the season. It was confirmed in January that he would remain at Glentoran until the end of the season. After the conclusion to the season, he was offered a new contract by Lincoln City.

=== Heart of Midlothian ===
On 27 May 2026, it was confirmed that Kamson-Kamara would join Scottish Premiership side Heart of Midlothian on 1 July 2026, penning a deal until the summer of 2030, with Lincoln City receiving a six-figure compensation fee.

On 3 September 2026, Kamson-Kamara joined Scottish Premiership rivals Kilmarnock on loan until January.

== International career ==
In September 2026, Kamson-Kamara received his maiden call-up to the Sierra Leone squad for their fixtures against Zimbabwe and Equatorial Guinea.

== Career statistics ==
=== Club ===
As of 21 November 2026

Club	Season	League			National Cup (Note: Includes FA Cup & Irish Cup)		League Cup (Note: Includes Northern Ireland Football League Cup)		Other		Total	
Club	Season	Division	Apps	Goals	Apps	Goals	Apps	Goals	Apps	Goals	Apps	Goals
Lincoln City	2023–24	League One	0	0	0	0	0	0	—		0	0
Lincoln City	2024–25	League One	0	0	0	0	0	0	1 (Note: Appearance(s) in EFL Trophy)	0	1	0
Lincoln City	2025–26	League One	0	0	0	0	0	0	—		0	0
Lincoln City	Total		0	0	0	0	0	0	1	0	1	0
Barwell (loan)	2023–24	SL Premier Division Central	30	2	0	0	—		1 (Note: Appearance in Leicestershire and Rutland Senior Cup)	0	31	2
Peterborough Sports (loan)	2024–25	National League North	19	0	5	0	—		—		24	0
Glentoran (loan)	2025–26	NIFL Premiership	23	3	3	1	4	0	1 (Note: Appearance in County Antrim Shield)	1	31	5
Heart of Midlothian	2026–27	Scottish Premiership	0	0	0	0	0	0	1 (Note: Appearances in UEFA Europa League)	0	1	0
Kilmarnock (loan)	2026–27	Scottish Premiership	6	0	0	0	0	0	—		6	0
Career total			78	5	8	1	4	0	4	1	94	7

=== International ===
As of 28 September 2026

Appearances and goals by national team and year
National team	Year	Apps	Goals
Sierra Leone	2026	2	0
Total		2	0
