= Jordi Altena =

Dutch footballer (born 2003)

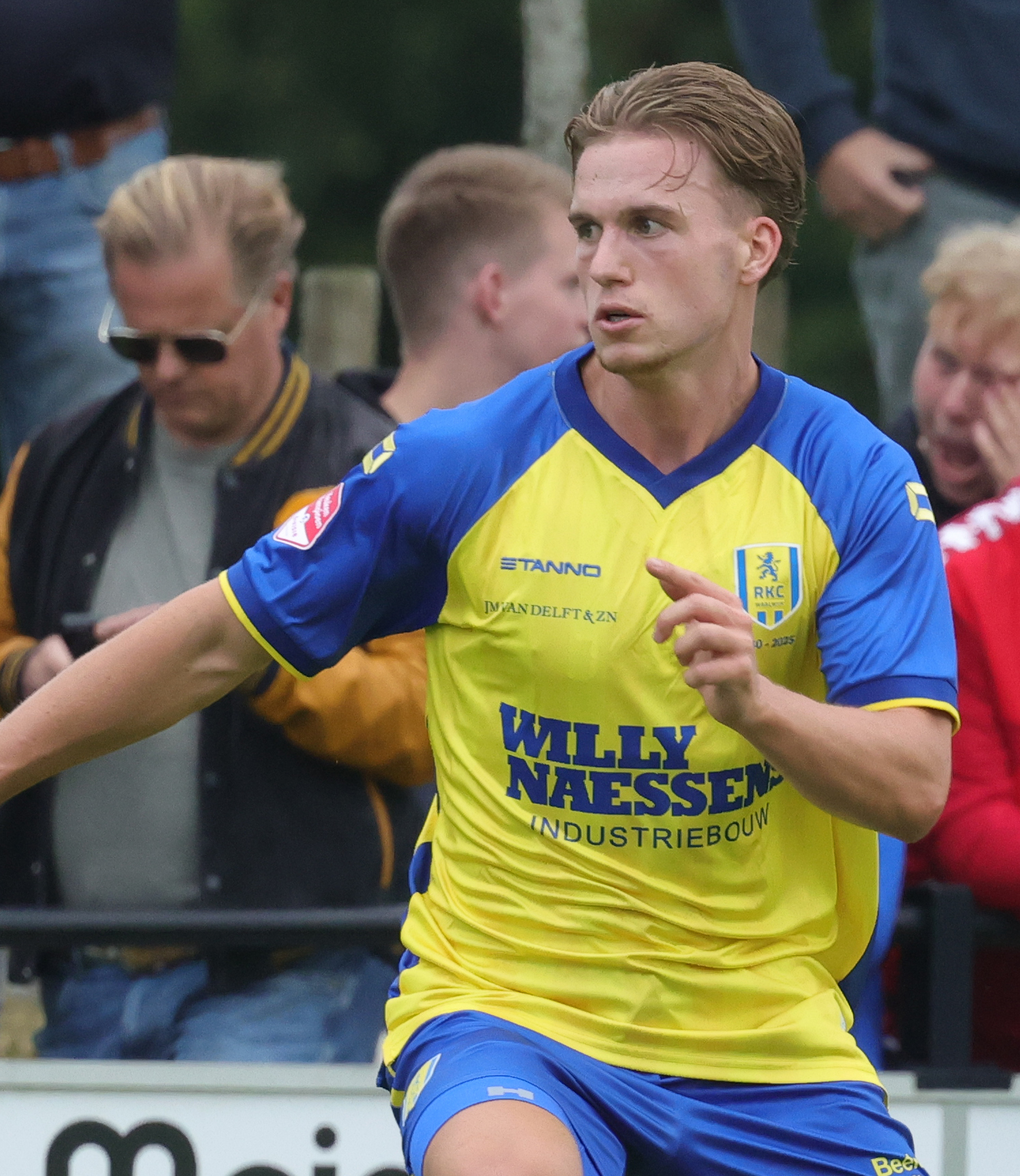
- Altena with RKC Waalwijk in 2025

Personal information
- Date of birth: 4 December 2003 (age 22)
- Place of birth: Sleeuwijk, North Brabant, Netherlands
- Positions: Defender; midfielder; winger

Team information
- Current team: Heart of Midlothian
- Number: 23

Youth career
- –2014: VV Sleeuwijk
- 2014–2018: Dordrecht
- 2018–2024: Vitesse

Senior career*
Years	Team	Apps	(Gls)
2023–2024	Vitesse	2	(0)
2024–2025	De Treffers	27	(3)
2025–2026	RKC	21	(2)
2026–	Heart of Midlothian	27	(0)
- * Club domestic league appearances and goals as of 22 November 2026

Jordi Altena (born 4 December 2003) is a Dutch professional footballer who plays as a defender, midfielder or winger for Scottish Premiership club Heart of Midlothian.

== Early life ==
Altena was born on 4 December 2003. Born in the Netherlands, he is a native of Sleeuwijk in North Brabant.

== Career ==
As a youth player, Nieling joined the youth academy of Dutch side VV Sleeuwijk. Following his stint there, he joined the youth academy of Dutch side FC Dordrecht in 2014. Four years later, he joined the youth academy of Dutch side SBV Vitesse and was promoted to the club's senior team in 2023, where he made two league appearances and scored zero goals.

Ahead of the 2024–25 season, he signed for Dutch side De Treffers, where he made twenty-seven league appearances and scored three goals. During the summer of 2025, he signed for Dutch side RKC Waalwijk, where he made twenty-one league appearances and scored two goals. Six months later, he signed for Scottish side Heart of Midlothian after receiving interest from American side D.C. United and Spanish side Real Valladolid.

== Career statistics ==
As of 22 November 2026

Appearances and goals by club, season and competition
Club	Season	League			National cup (Note: Includes Norwegian Football Cup, Scottish Cup)		League cup (Note: Includes Scottish League Cup)		Europe		Total	
Club	Season	Division	Apps	Goals	Apps	Goals	Apps	Goals	Apps	Goals	Apps	Goals
Vitesse	2023–24	Eredivisie	2	0	0	0	–		–		2	0
Vitesse	Total		2	0	0	0	–		–		2	0
De Treffers	2024–25	Tweede Divisie	27	3	0	0	–		–		27	3
De Treffers	Total		27	3	0	0	–		–		27	3
RKC	2025–26	Keuken Kampioen Divisie	21	2	2	2	–		–		23	4
RKC	Total		21	2	2	2	–		–		23	4
Heart of Midlothian	2025–26	Scottish Premiership	16	0	1	0	0	0	0	0	17	0
Heart of Midlothian	2026–27	Scottish Premiership	11	0	0	0	2	0	8	0	21	0
Heart of Midlothian	Total		27	0	1	0	2	0	8	0	38	0
Career total			77	5	3	2	2	0	8	0	90	7
