= Tom Renaud =

French footballer (born 2000)

- Renaud in 2026

Personal information
- Full name: Tom Renaud
- Date of birth: 19 November 2000 (age 25)
- Place of birth: Ploemeur, France
- Height: 1.80 m (5 ft 11 in)
- Positions: Defender; midfielder

Team information
- Current team: Heart of Midlothian
- Number: 12

Youth career
- Lorient

Senior career*
Years	Team	Apps	(Gls)
2016–2020	Lorient B	38	(1)
2019–2022	Lorient	0	(0)
2020–2022	→ Cholet (loan)	44	(2)
2022–2024	Cholet	60	(5)
2024–2026	Versailles	54	(0)
2026–	Heart of Midlothian	1	(1)
- * Club domestic league appearances and goals as of 10 August 2026

Tom Renaud (born 19 November 2000) is a French professional footballer who plays as a defensive midfielder for Scottish Premiership side Heart of Midlothian. Renaud began his career as youth with FC Lorient and subsequently played for Cholet and FC Versailles.

== Early life ==
Renaud was born on 19 November 2000 in Ploemeur, France. Growing up, he started playing football at the age of five.

== Career ==
As a youth player, Renaud joined the youth academy of French side Lorient and was promoted to the club's reserve team in 2016, where he made thirty-eight league appearances and scored one goal. Following his stint there, he signed for French side Cholet in 2020, where he made sixty league appearances and scored five goals.

During the summer of 2024, Renaud signed for French side Versailles, where he made fifty-four league appearances and scored zero goals and helped the club achieve fifth place in the league.

Ahead of the 2026–27 season, Renaud signed for Scottish Premiership side Heart of Midlothian on a four year deal. He made his debut for the club, coming on as a 75th-minute substitute, in a 4-0 loss against Sturm Graz in the first leg of the UEFA Champions League's second qualifying round. Renaud scored his first goal for Hearts when he "latched on to possession before expertly sending a low drive into Samuel Soares’ bottom right corner to pull one back, in a 6-1 loss against Benfica in the first leg of the UEFA Europa League third qualifying round. Renaud scored his first league goal for the club, in a 4-0 win against Dundee United on 8 August 2026. However, in the return leg against Rapid Wien in the play-off round of UEFA Conference League, he suffered ankle injury and substituted in the 15th minute, as Hearts went on to win 4-3 on penalties following a 2-2 draw.

== Style of play ==
Renaud plays as a defender or midfielder. French newspaper Ouest-France wrote in 2018 "initially a striker, then a central defender, he ultimately found his niche as a defensive midfielder".

== Career statistics ==
As of 27 August 2026

Appearances and goals by club, season and competition
Club	Season	League			National cup (Note: Includes Norwegian Football Cup, Scottish Cup)		League cup (Note: Includes Scottish League Cup)		Europe		Total	
Club	Season	Division	Apps	Goals	Apps	Goals	Apps	Goals	Apps	Goals	Apps	Goals
Cholet	2020–21	Championnat National	15	0	1	0	–		–		16	0
Cholet	2021–22	Championnat National	29	2	4	0	–		–		33	2
Cholet	2022–23	Championnat National	29	1	3	0	–		–		32	1
Cholet	2023–24	Championnat National	31	4	0	0	–		–		31	4
Cholet	Total		104	7	8	0	–		–		112	7
Versailles	2024–25	Championnat National	24	0	0	0	–		–		24	0
Versailles	2025–26	Championnat National	30	0	0	0	–		–		30	0
Versailles	Total		54	0	0	0	–		–		54	0
Heart of Midlothian	2026–27	Scottish Premiership	1	1	0	0	1	0	6	1	8	2
Heart of Midlothian	Total		1	1	0	0	1	0	6	1	8	2
Career total			159	8	8	0	1	0	6	1	174	9
