= Laurent Mendy =

Laurent Mendy is the name of:

- Laurent Mendy (footballer, born 1997), French footballer
- Laurent Mendy (footballer, born 2001), Senegalese footballer
