= Sabri Guendouz =

French footballer (born 2000)

- Guendouz in 2026

Personal information
- Full name: Severin Sabri Guendouz
- Date of birth: 9 February 2000 (age 26)
- Place of birth: Cambrai, France
- Height: 1.80 m (5 ft 11 in)
- Positions: Midfielder; winger; forward

Team information
- Current team: Heart of Midlothian
- Number: 19

Youth career
- –2015: Le Blanc-Mesnil Sport Football
- 2015–2017: Angers SCO
- 2017–2018: Entente SSG
- 2018–2020: Valenciennes FC

Senior career*
Years	Team	Apps	(Gls)
2019–2020	Valenciennes FC B	16	(2)
2020–2025	En Avant Guingamp B	68	(12)
2024–2025	En Avant Guingamp	21	(0)
2025–2026	K Beerschot VA	31	(3)
2026–	Heart of Midlothian	8	(2)
- * Club domestic league appearances and goals as of 22 November 2026

Severin Sabri Guendouz (born 9 February 2000) is a French professional footballer who plays for Scottish Premiership side Heart of Midlothian, as a midfielder, winger or forward.

== Career ==
As a youth player, Guendouz joined the youth academy of French side Valenciennes FC and was promoted to the club's reserve team in 2019, where he made sixteen league appearances and scored two goals. Following his stint there, he signed for the reserve team of French side En Avant Guingamp in 2020 and was promoted to the club's senior team in 2024, where he made twenty league appearances and scored zero goals.

During the summer of 2025, he signed for Belgian side K Beerschot VA, where he made thirty-one league appearances and scored three goals. Ahead of the 2026–27 season, he signed for Scottish side Heart of Midlothian for an undisclosed fee.

== Style of play ==
Guendouz plays as a midfielder, winger or forward. Two-footed, he is known for his speed.

== Personal life ==
Guendouz was born on 9 February 2000. Born in Cambrai France, he has been married.

== Career statistics ==
As of 22 November 2026

Appearances and goals by club, season and competition
Club	Season	League			National cup (Note: Includes Norwegian Football Cup, Scottish Cup)		League cup (Note: Includes Scottish League Cup)		Europe		Total	
Club	Season	Division	Apps	Goals	Apps	Goals	Apps	Goals	Apps	Goals	Apps	Goals
En Avant Guingamp	2024–25	Ligue 2	21	0	5	4	–		–		26	4
En Avant Guingamp	Total		21	0	5	4	–		–		26	4
K Beerschot VA	2025–26	Challenger Pro League	31	3	2	0	–		–		33	3
K Beerschot VA	Total		31	3	2	0	–		–		33	3
Heart of Midlothian	2026–27	Scottish Premiership	8	2	0	0	3	0	6	0	17	2
Heart of Midlothian	Total		8	2	0	0	3	0	6	0	17	2
Career total			60	5	7	4	3	0	6	0	76	9
