= Amadou Ba-Sy =

French footballer (born 2001)

- Ba-Sy in 2026

Personal information
- Date of birth: 8 June 2001 (age 25)
- Place of birth: Nice, France
- Height: 1.91 m (6 ft 3 in)
- Position: Forward

Team information
- Current team: Heart of Midlothian

Youth career
- 2011–2018: Nice

Senior career*
Years	Team	Apps	(Gls)
2018–2021	Nice II	8	(0)
2021–2022	Gazélec Ajaccio	24	(10)
2022–2024	Dunkerque	34	(7)
2024–2025	Vizela	8	(0)
2024–2025	→ Académica de Coimbra (loan)	19	(6)
2025–2026	Rouen	28	(6)
2026–	Heart of Midlothian	3	(0)
- * Club domestic league appearances and goals as of 24 October 2026

Amadou Ba-Sy (born 8 June 2001) is a French professional footballer who plays as a forward for Scottish Premiership club Heart of Midlothian.

Born in Nice, Ba-Sy began his career as a youth at local side OGC Nice. He has subsequently played for Gazélec Ajaccio, Dunkerque, Vizela, Académica de Coimbra and Rouen. He is of Senegalese descent.

== Career ==
A youth product of Nice since 2011, Ba-Sy began his senior career with their reserves in 2018. He moved to Gazélec Ajaccio for the 2021–22 season, and ended up scoring 10 goals in 24 games. On 30 June 2022, he transferred to Dunkerque in the Championnat National signing his first professional contract. He helped the team come in second on his debut season and earn promotion to the Ligue 2.

In January 2024, Ba-Sy joined Primeira Liga club Vizela on a two-and-a-half-year contract.

== Personal life ==
Born in France, Ba-Sy is of Senegalese descent and has dual nationality.
