= Sabah Kerjota =

Albanian footballer (born 2001)

- Kerjota in 2026

Personal information
- Date of birth: 14 August 2001 (age 25)
- Place of birth: Shkodër, Albania
- Height: 1.76 m (5 ft 9 in)
- Position: Winger

Team information
- Current team: Heart of Midlothian
- Number: 29

Youth career
- 2009–2018: Vllaznia

Senior career*
Years	Team	Apps	(Gls)
2018–2019	Narnese		
2019–2020	Clitunno	22	(15)
2020–2021	Ancona		
2021–2022	Montefano		
2022–2024	Vigor Senigallia	69	(19)
2024–2025	Sambenedettese	36	(10)
2025–	Heart of Midlothian	30	(3)
- * Club domestic league appearances and goals as of 22 November 2026

Sabah Kerjota (born 14 August 2001) is an Albanian professional footballer who plays as a winger for Scottish Premiership side Heart of Midlothian.

== Club career ==
As a youth player, Kerjota joined the youth academy of Albanian side Vllaznia. In 2018, he signed for Italian side Narnese, before signing Clitunno in 2019, where he made twenty-two league appearances and scored fifteen goals. One year later, he signed for Ancona. Subsequently, he signed for Montefano in 2021.

Following his stint there, he signed for Vigor Senigallia in 2022, where he made sixty-nine league appearances and scored nineteen goals. Italian newspaper il Resto del Carlino wrote in 2025 that "in his first season [with the club], his play was eye-catching, so much so that he was named the Best Young Player in Serie D for the 2022–23 season, with nine goals and thirteen assists".

During the summer of 2024, he signed for Sambenedettese, where he made thirty-six league appearances and scored ten goals and helped the club achieve promotion to Serie C.

Ahead of the 2025–26 season, he signed for Scottish side Heart of Midlothian. Memorably, he set up a last minute winner over Hibernian in his first Edinburgh derby, having been on the pitch for only ten minutes. He also contributed with two assists when Hearts came from behind to beat Hibs 2–1 at Easter Road.

== International career ==
On 19 September 2026, Rolando Maran called Kerjota up to the senior Albanian national team for a set of 2026–27 UEFA Nations League matches.

== Personal life ==
Kerjota was born on 14 August 2001 in Shkodër, Albania.
