= Laurent Mendy (footballer, born 1997) =

French footballer (born 1997)

- Mendy in 2026

Personal information
- Full name: Laurent Mendy
- Date of birth: 26 March 1997 (age 29)
- Place of birth: France
- Height: 6 ft 3 in (1.91 m)
- Positions: Centre-back; right-back; defensive midfielder

Team information
- Current team: Heart of Midlothian
- Number: 78

Senior career*
| Years | Team | Apps | (Gls) |
| 2017–2018 | Thamesmead Town | 45 | (12) |
| 2018–2019 | Greenwich Borough | 17 | (1) |
| 2019 | Whyteleafe | 3 | (0) |
| 2019 | Ashford United | 9 | (0) |
| 2019–2020 | Dartford | 1 | (0) |
| 2020 | VCD Athletic | 5 | (0) |
| 2020–2021 | IFK Åmål | 12 | (0) |
| 2021–2025 | Macclesfield FC | 104 | (2) |
| 2025–2026 | Forest Green Rovers | 44 | (1) |
| 2026– | Heart of Midlothian | 11 | (3) |
- * Club domestic league appearances and goals as of 22 November 2026 (UTC)

Laurent Mendy (born 26 March 1997) is a French professional footballer who plays as a centre-back or defensive midfielder for Scottish Premiership club Heart of Midlothian.

== Career ==
In March 2020, Mendy joined Swedish Division 2 (fourth tier) club IFK Åmål on a free transfer.

In 2021, Mendy signed for newly-formed North West Counties League Premier Division club Macclesfield, the phoenix team from the defunct Macclesfield Town.

On 2 July 2025, Mendy signed for National League side Forest Green Rovers, following former Macclesfield manager Robbie Savage to the club.

In January 2026 he was the subject of a failed transfer offer from Scottish Premiership club Heart of Midlothian. In July 2026, Forest Green accepted a bid of £500,000 from Hearts for Mendy, potentially rising to a club record fee of £1 million. The transfer was confirmed on 24 July, and Mendy signed a three-year contract with Hearts. He made his debut just over a week later, starting and playing 75 minutes as a central midfielder in a 2–1 loss away to Aberdeen. On 3 September, he scored his first goal for Hearts in a 1–3 Edinburgh Derby win away at Easter Road.

== Career statistics ==
As of 22 November 2026

Appearances and goals by club, season and competition
| Club | Season | League | | | FA Cup | | EFL Cup | | Other | | Total | |
| Club | Season | Division | Apps | Goals | Apps | Goals | Apps | Goals | Apps | Goals | Apps | Goals |
|---|---|---|---|---|---|---|---|---|---|---|---|---|
| Thamesmead Town | 2016–17 | IL Division One North | 4 | 0 | — | | — | | — | | 4 | 0 |
| Thamesmead Town | 2017–18 | IL South Division | 41 | 12 | 4 | 0 | — | | 7 (Note: Three appearances in Alan Turvey Trophy; four appearances, one goal in FA Trophy) | 1 | 52 | 13 |
| Thamesmead Town | Total | | 45 | 12 | 4 | 0 | 0 | 0 | 7 | 1 | 56 | 13 |
| Greenwich Borough | 2018–19 | IL South East Division | 17 | 1 | 1 | 1 | — | | 3 (Note: One appearance in Alan Turvey Trophy; two appearances, two goals in FA Trophy) | 2 | 21 | 4 |
| Whyteleafe | 2018–19 | IL South East Division | 3 | 0 | — | | — | | — | | 3 | 0 |
| Ashford United | 2018–19 | IL South East Division | 7 | 0 | — | | — | | 2 (Note: Appearances in Isthmian League South East Division play-offs) | 0 | 9 | 0 |
| Ashford United | 2019–20 | IL South East Division | 2 | 0 | 0 | 0 | — | | 0 | 0 | 2 | 0 |
| Ashford United | Total | | 9 | 0 | 0 | 0 | 0 | 0 | 2 | 0 | 11 | 0 |
| Dartford | 2019–20 | National League South | 1 | 0 | — | | — | | 2 (Note: Appearances in FA Trophy) | 0 | 3 | 0 |
| VCD Athletic | 2019–20 | IL South East Division | 5 | 0 | — | | — | | — | | 5 | 0 |
| IFK Åmål | 2020 | Division 2 Norra Götaland | 12 | 0 | — | | — | | 1 (Note: One appearance in Svenska Cupen) | 0 | 13 | 0 |
| Macclesfield | 2021–22 | NWCL Premier Division | 40 | | 2 | 0 | — | | 0 | | | |
| Macclesfield | 2022–23 | NPL Division One West | 37 | 0 | 4 | 0 | — | | 5 (Note: Four appearances in FA Trophy; one appearance in Cheshire Senior Cup) | 0 | 46 | 0 |
| Macclesfield | 2023–24 | NPL Premier Division | 33 | 1 | 4 | 1 | — | | 9 (Note: Seven appearances in FA Trophy; two appearances in Northern Premier League Premier Division play-offs) | 0 | 46 | 2 |
| Macclesfield | 2024–25 | NPL Premier Division | 42 | 3 | 4 | 0 | — | | 3 | 0 | 49 | 3 |
| Macclesfield | Total | | 152 | | | | 0 | 0 | | | | |
| Forest Green Rovers | 2025–26 | National League | 44 | 1 | 2 | 0 | — | | 4 (Note: One appearance in National League Cup; two appearances in FA Trophy; one appearance in National League play-offs) | 0 | 48 | 1 |
| Heart of Midlothian | 2026–27 | Scottish Premiership | 11 | 3 | 0 | 0 | 2 | 0 | 4 | 0 | 17 | 3 |
| Career total | | | | | | | | | | | | |
