= Cormac Daly (footballer) =

Scottish footballer

Personal information
- Full name: Cormac Daly
- Date of birth: 17 March 2007 (age 19)
- Position: Winger

Team information
- Current team: Arbroath (on loan from Heart of Midlothian)
- Number: 19

Youth career
- –2023: Hamilton Academical
- 2023–2026: Nottingham Forest
- 2026–: Heart of Midlothian

Senior career*
Years	Team	Apps	(Gls)
2024–2026	Nottingham Forest	0	(0)
2025	→ Lincoln United (loan)	2	(0)
2026	→ Hereford (loan)	24	(3)
2026–	Heart of Midlothian	0	(0)
2026–	→ Arbroath (loan)	9	(0)

International career^{‡}
2022	Scotland U16	2	(0)
2025	Scotland U19	2	(0)
- * Club domestic league appearances and goals as of 18:57, 24 October 2026 (UTC) ‡ National team caps and goals as of 07:57, 2 July 2026 (UTC)

Cormac Daly (born 17 March 2007) is a Scottish professional footballer who plays for Scottish Championship side Arbroath, on loan from Heart of Midlothian, as a winger. He began his career as a youth with Hamilton Academical, before joining Nottingham Forest in 2023. He was subsequently loaned out to Lincoln United and Hereford, before returning to Scotland on a permanent deal with Heart of Midlothian.

Daly has represented Scotland at under 16 and under 19 level.

== Club career ==
=== Early career ===
Daly began his career at Hamilton Academical, where he was part of their U18 league-winning team in 2023. He then joined Premier League club Nottingham Forest in September 2023, signing a two-year professional contract from his 17th birthday until 2026.

On 14 November 2025, Daly joined Northern Premier League Division One East club Lincoln United on a 28-day loan. He made his debut the following day in a 1–0 league win at home against Blyth Spartans.

On 28 January 2026, Daly joined National League North club Hereford on loan until the end of the season, joining alongside fellow Forest academy player Cherif Yaya. He made his debut for the club in a 2–1 league defeat away against Curzon Ashton on 31 January. He scored his first goals for both the club and in senior football on 24 February, in a 5–2 league win at home against Chester.

Despite a successful loan playing 24 games for 3 goals and 1 assist, as he was a key player for the team that narrowly avoided relegation from the National League, he left Nottingham Forest as a free agent at the end of the 2025–26 season.

=== Heart of Midlothian ===
On 30 June 2026, it was announced that Daly had returned to Scotland after three years to join Scottish Premiership club Heart of Midlothian, signing a two-year contract.

==== Arbroath loan ====
On 17 July 2026, Daly joined Scottish Championship club Arbroath on a season-long loan.

== International career ==
Daly was called up to Scotland U16 in August 2022 for back-to-back friendlies against Denmark in Spain.

He was named in the Scotland U19 squad in March 2025 for friendlies against Sweden and Poland. He appeared as a second-half substitute in both matches, making his under-19 debut in the 1–1 draw against Sweden.

== Career statistics ==
As of match played 24 October 2026

Appearances and goals by club, season and competition
Club	Season	League			National cup (Note: Includes Scottish Cup)		League cup (Note: Includes Scottish League Cup)		Other		Total	
Club	Season	Division	Apps	Goals	Apps	Goals	Apps	Goals	Apps	Goals	Apps	Goals
Nottingham Forest U21	2024–25	—			—		—		1 (Note: Appearance in National League Cup)	0	1	0
Nottingham Forest U21	2025–26	—			—		—		1	0	1	0
Nottingham Forest U21	Total		0	0	0	0	0	0	2	0	2	0
Lincoln United (loan)	2025–26	NPL Division One East	2	0	—		—		—		2	0
Hereford (loan)	2025–26	National League North	24	3	—		—		—		24	3
Heart of Midlothian B	2026–27	—			—		—		5 (Note: Appearances in Scottish Challenge Cup)	2	5	2
Arbroath (loan)	2026–27	Scottish Championship	9	0	0	0	3	0	0	0	12	0
Career total			35	3	0	0	3	0	7	2	45	5
