= Aron Benjaminsen =

Faroese footballer (born 2007)

Personal information
- Date of birth: 2 November 2007 (age 19)
- Place of birth: Faroe Islands
- Position: Winger

Team information
- Current team: Heart of Midlothian
- Number: 27

Youth career
- –2024: Skála

Senior career*
Years	Team	Apps	(Gls)
2024–2025	Kristiansund	0	(0)
2024–2025	Kristiansund 2	42	(5)
2026	Víkingur	20	(7)
2026–	Heart of Midlothian	0	(0)

International career^{‡}
2022–2023	Faroe Islands U17	18	(4)
2024–2025	Faroe Islands U19	8	(2)
2025–	Faroe Islands U21	3	(0)
2026–	Faroe Islands	2	(0)
- * Club domestic league appearances and goals as of 28 August 2026 ‡ National team caps and goals as of 16 November 2026

Aron Benjaminsen (born 2 November 2007) is a Faroese professional footballer who plays as a winger for Scottish Premiership side Heart of Midlothian and the Faroe Islands national team.

Benjaminsen began his career as a youth at local side Skála ÍF and Norwegian side Kristiansund 2, before returning to the Faroe Islands to sign for Víkingur. He has previously represented the Faroe Islands at under-17, under-19 and under-21 level.

== Early life ==
Benjaminsen was born on 2 November 2007 in the Faroe Islands. He is the son of Fróði Benjaminsen and the cousin of Árni Frederiksberg, themselves both Faroe Islands national footballers.

== Club career ==
As a youth player, Benjaminsen joined the youth academy of Skála. Following his stint there, he signed for Norwegian side Kristiansund at the age of sixteen and played for the club's reserve team, where he made forty-two league appearances and scored five goals.

Ahead of the 2026 Faroese season, he signed for Víkingur, where he played in the UEFA Conference League. On 13 March 2026, he first started for the club during a 0–0 home draw with B36 in the league and went on to make twenty league appearances and score seven goals while playing for them. In September 2026, he signed for Scottish Premiership side Heart of Midlothian.

== International career ==
Benjaminsen is a Faroe Islands international and has represented his country at youth level. Altogether, he made eighteen appearances and scored four goals while playing for the Faroe Islands national under-17 football team and eight appearances and scored two goals while playing for the Faroe Islands national under-19 football team.

At the age of seventeen, he debuted for the Faroe Islands national under-21 football team. During June, September and October 2025 and March 2026, he played for the Faroe Islands national under-21 football team for 2027 UEFA European Under-21 Championship qualification.

On 29 September 2026, Benjaminsen made his debut for the Faroe Islands national team in a 2026–27 UEFA Nations League C game against Moldova.

=== International ===
As of match played on 16 November 2026

Appearances and goals by national team and year
National team	Year	Apps	Goals
Faroe Islands	2026	2	0
Total		2	0

== Style of play ==
Benjaminsen plays as a winger. Left-footed, he is known for his dribbling ability and received comparisons to Switzerland international Xherdan Shaqiri.

Scottish newspaper Edinburgh Evening News wrote in 2026 that he "[was] regarded as one of his country's most promising emerging talents. He is predominantly a right-sided wide player but can also operate on the left. He is known for drifting into the penalty area to get on the end of crosses and his finishing prowess earned him a big reputation in his homeland".
