= Craig McLeish =

Scottish football manager (born 1990)

Personal information
- Date of birth: 27 March 1990 (age 36)
- Place of birth: Rutherglen, Scotland
- Position: Midfielder

Team information
- Current team: St Mirren (manager)

Senior career*
Years	Team	Apps	(Gls)
2010–2011	Falkirk	0	(0)
2010–2011	→ Dumbarton (loan)	10	(2)
2011–2012	Stirling Albion	18	(1)
2012–2013	Montrose	16	(1)
2013–2014	East Kilbride		
2014–2015	Clyde	4	(0)
2015	East Kilbride		
2015–2017	Queen's Park	34	(0)
2017	→ East Kilbride (loan)		
2017	East Kilbride		
2017–2018	Albion Rovers	17	(1)

Managerial career
- 2026: St Mirren (interim)
- 2026–: St Mirren
- * Club domestic league appearances and goals

Craig McLeish (born 27 March 1990) is a Scottish professional football manager and former player who is the manager of Scottish Premiership club St Mirren. A midfielder during his playing career, McLeish played in the lower divisions of Scottish football for clubs including Dumbarton, Stirling Albion, Montrose, Clyde, Queen's Park and Albion Rovers.

After moving into coaching, McLeish spent a number of years working in the St Mirren youth academy before joining the club's first-team coaching staff. He was appointed interim manager in March 2026 following the departure of Stephen Robinson, and subsequently led St Mirren to survival in the Scottish Premiership through the relegation play-offs. He was appointed permanent manager in June 2026.

== Playing career ==
McLeish began his senior career with Falkirk. In November 2010, he joined Dumbarton on loan. His time at Dumbarton was interrupted by a shoulder injury in February 2011. After leaving Falkirk, McLeish joined Stirling Albion, where he remained for the 2011–12 season. He subsequently played for Montrose and East Kilbride. In September 2014, McLeish signed a one-year contract with Clyde. He was primarily used as a left-sided midfielder.

In the 2014–15 season, McLeish was loaned back to East Kilbride in the Lowland Football League, where they finished as runners-up to Edinburgh City. He returned to the Scottish Professional Football League when he joined Queen's Park in June 2015, under manager Gus MacPherson.

McLeish was loaned for a third spell at East Kilbride in January 2017, helping them to the Lowland title and reach the play-off final for the SPFL; he signed a permanent deal but was released in August due to manager Billy Stark preferring 18-year-old Michael Anderson. McLeish joined Albion Rovers in Scottish League One in September 2017. His Scottish Football League career included 99 league appearances and five goals.

== Coaching career ==
=== St Mirren academy ===
Following his playing career, McLeish moved into coaching and became involved with the St Mirren youth academy. He worked in a number of youth-development roles and also gained experience coaching at youth level with Scottish national teams.

McLeish eventually became St Mirren's head of technical performance and lead coach of the club's under-19 side. He later moved into a first-team transition role, working to help academy players progress into the senior squad.

=== St Mirren manager ===
On 12 March 2026, McLeish stepped up from his academy and first-team development role to take temporary charge of St Mirren following the departure of manager Stephen Robinson to Aberdeen. On his debut three days later, the team lost 1–0 at home to Rangers. After initially taking charge on a caretaker basis, St Mirren confirmed later that month that McLeish would remain interim manager until the end of the 2025–26 season. St Mirren finished 11th in the Scottish Premiership and entered the relegation play-off final against Partick Thistle. After a 1–1 draw at Firhill in the first leg, St Mirren won the return match 1–0, securing a 2–1 aggregate victory and retaining their place in the Premiership.

On 5 June 2026, McLeish was appointed St Mirren manager on a permanent basis, signing a three-year contract running until the summer of 2029. During his 12 matches as interim manager, McLeish gave first-team debuts to four St Mirren academy players: Grant Tamosevicius, Caiden McMillan, Thomas Falconer and Luke Douglas. Following his permanent appointment, he said that providing greater opportunities for academy players would form an important part of his plans for the club.
