= Oudorp =

- Neighbourhood and former village
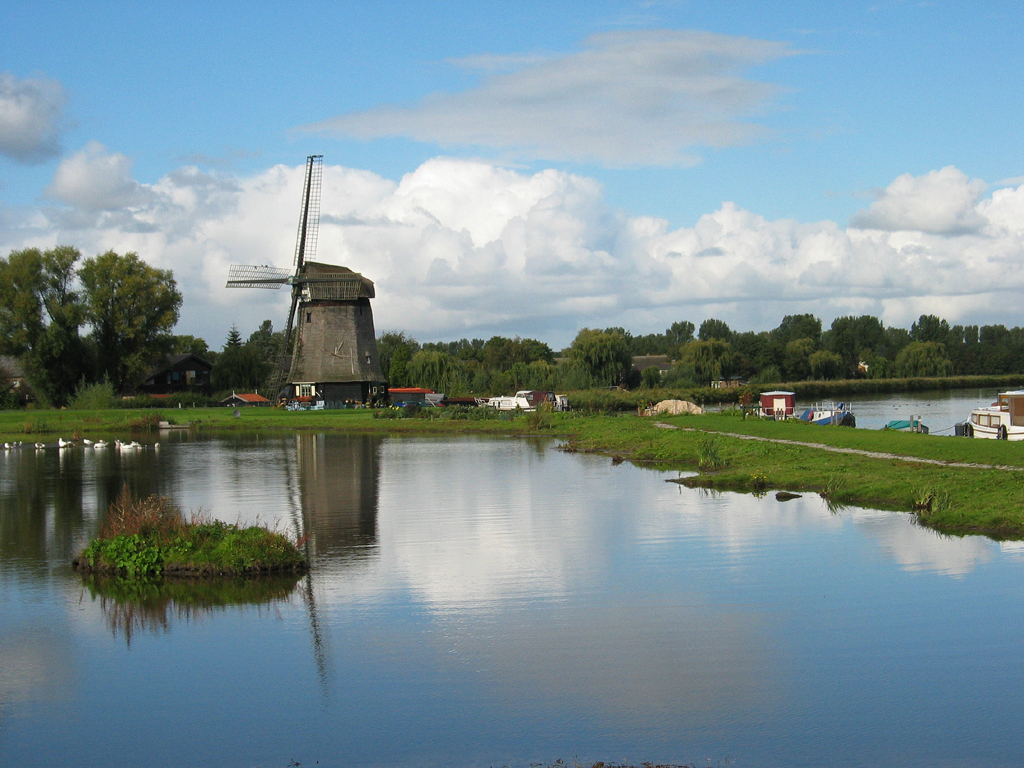
- Windmill "Ambachtsmolen" in Oudorp

- Coat of arms

- Location in the Netherlands Location in the province of North Holland in the Netherlands
- Coordinates: 52°37′59″N 4°46′25″E
- Country: Netherlands
- Province: North Holland
- Municipality: Alkmaar

Area
  - Total: 6.35 km^{2} (2.45 sq mi)
- Elevation: 0.6 m (2.0 ft)

Population (2022)
  - Total: 13,665
  - Density: 2,338/km^{2} (6,060/sq mi)
- Demonym: Oudorper
- Time zone: UTC+1 (CET)
  - Summer (DST): UTC+2 (CEST)
- Postal code: 1821-1823 & 1829
- Dialing code: 072

Oudorp (Dutch pronunciation: [ˈʌudɔr(ə)p]) is a neighbourhood of Alkmaar and former village in the Dutch province of North Holland. It is located about 2 km (1 mi) east of the city centre. The village merged with Alkmaar in 1972.

== History ==
The village was first mentioned in the first half of the 11th century as Aldenthorf, and means "old village". Oudorp developed on a beach wall. Between 1278 and 1288, the castles Middelburg and Nieuwburg were built by order of Floris V, Count of Holland. Both castles were destroyed in 1517. During the Siege of Alkmaar in 1573, the Spanish army was stationed in Oudorp.

The Dutch Reformed church is built on a terp (artificial living hill). It was damaged by war in 1573, and the nave was reconstructed in the late-16th century. In 1858, it was extensively modified. The tower collapsed in 1867, and the front of the church was later rebuilt. Four of the six original polder mills which were built around 1630 still exists.

Oudorp was a separate municipality between 1817 and 1972, when it was annexed with Alkmaar.

Oudorp was home to 225 people in 1840. It has become more of a neighbourhood of Alkmaar ever since in the 1970s and the 1980s the area around it had been built up to become a residential area. The residential area connected Oudorp with the city of Alkmaar.

== Gallery ==
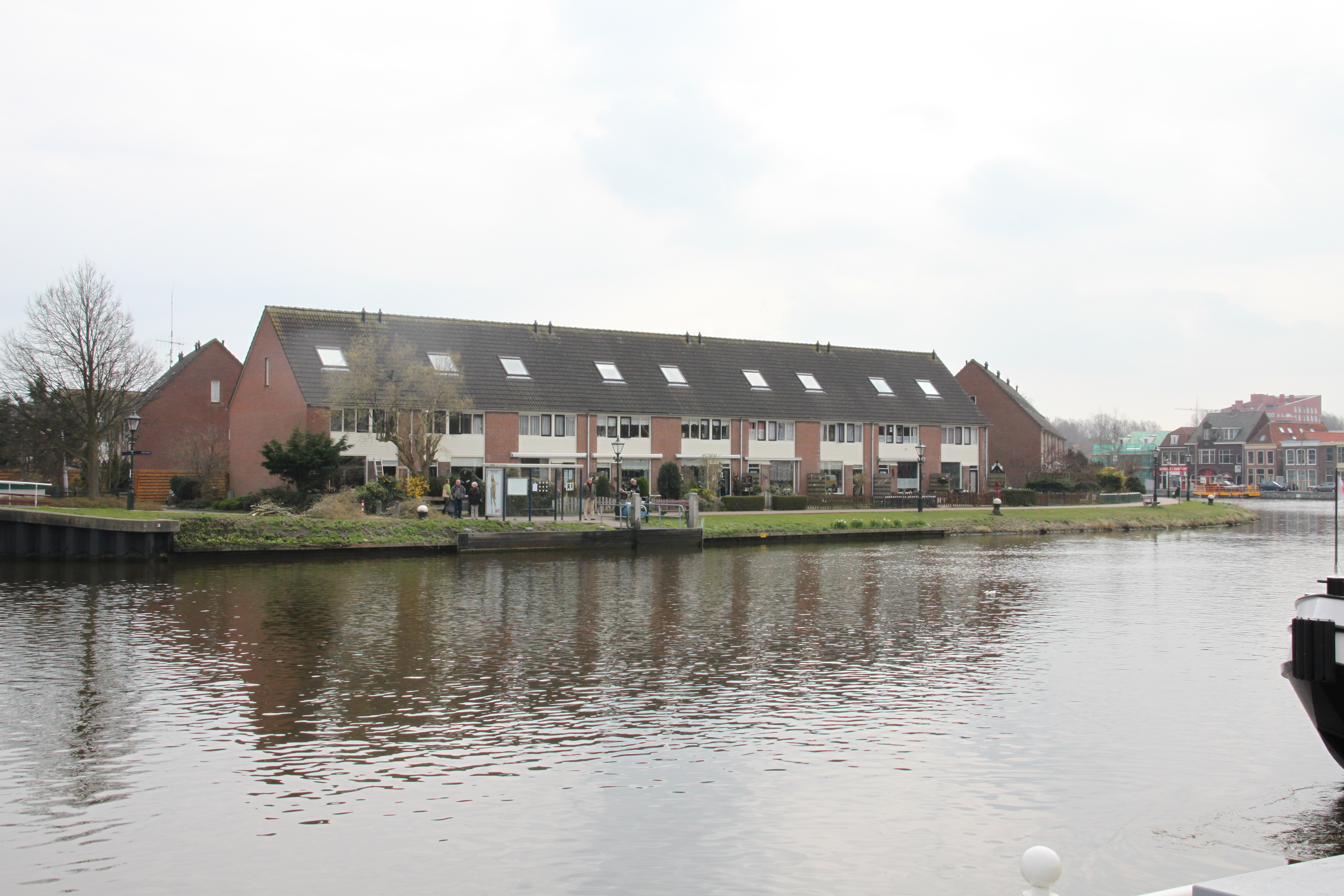
Houses in Oudorp

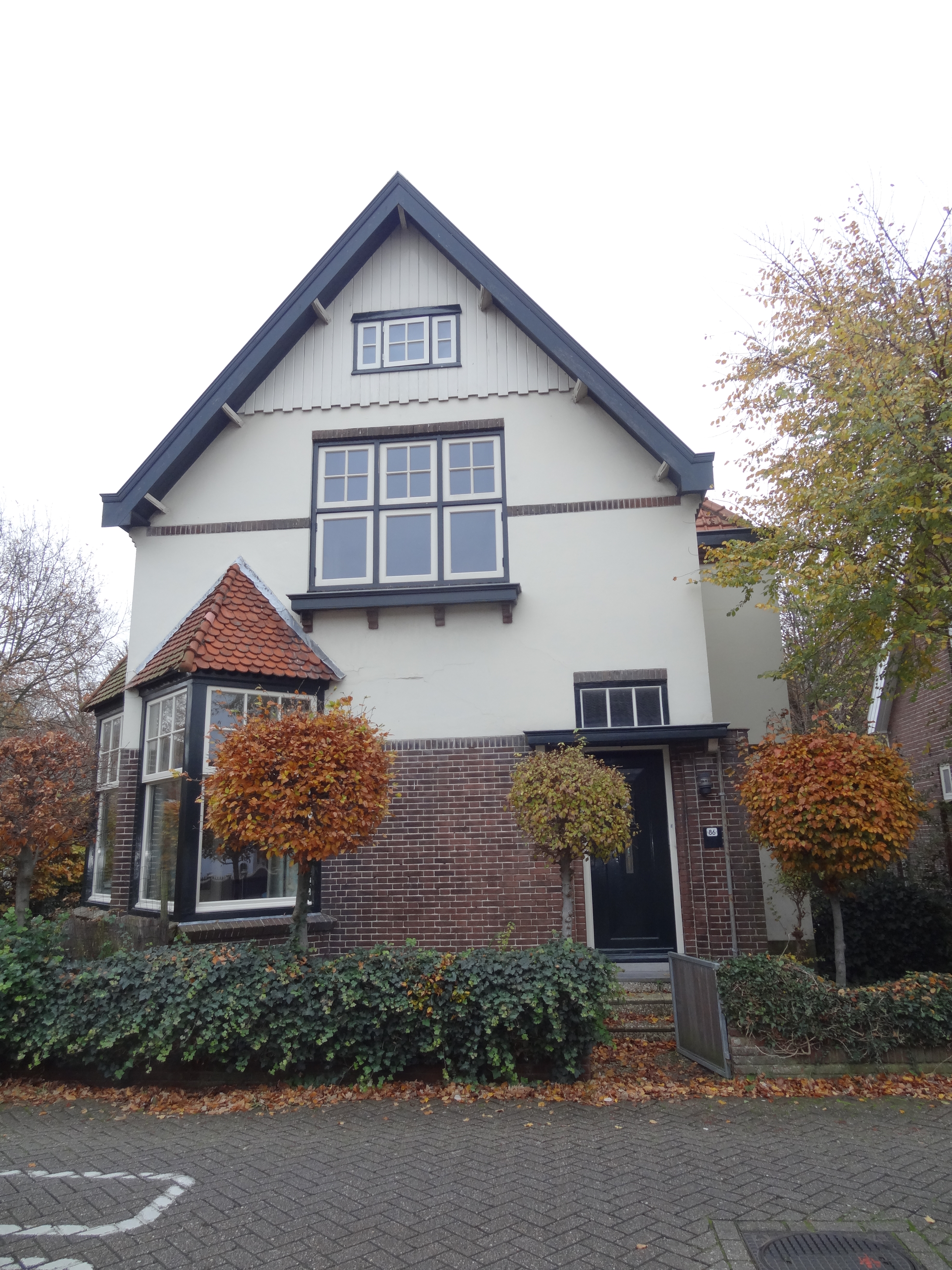
House in Oudorp

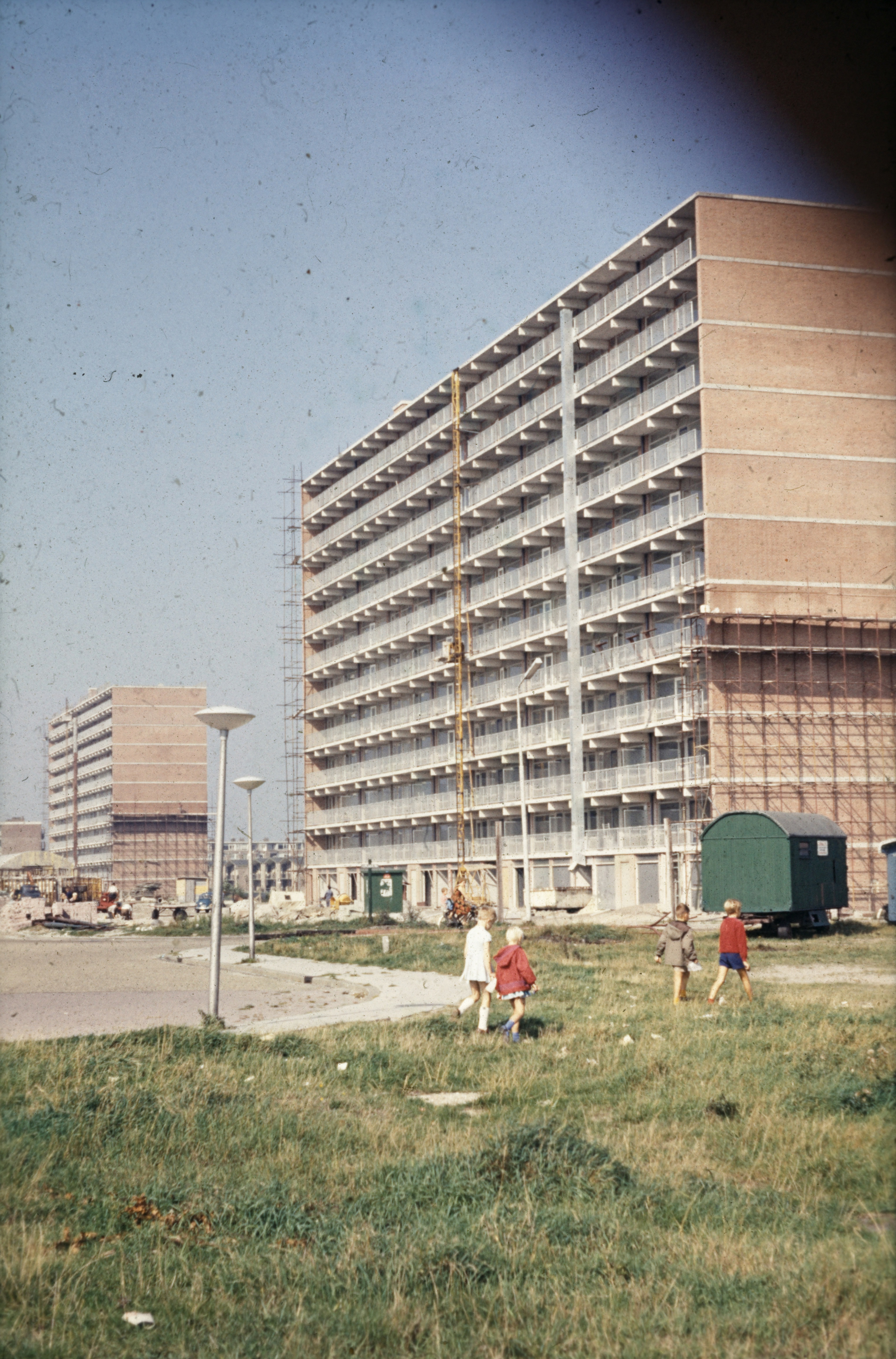
Construction of modern apartment buildings in Oudorp (1980)

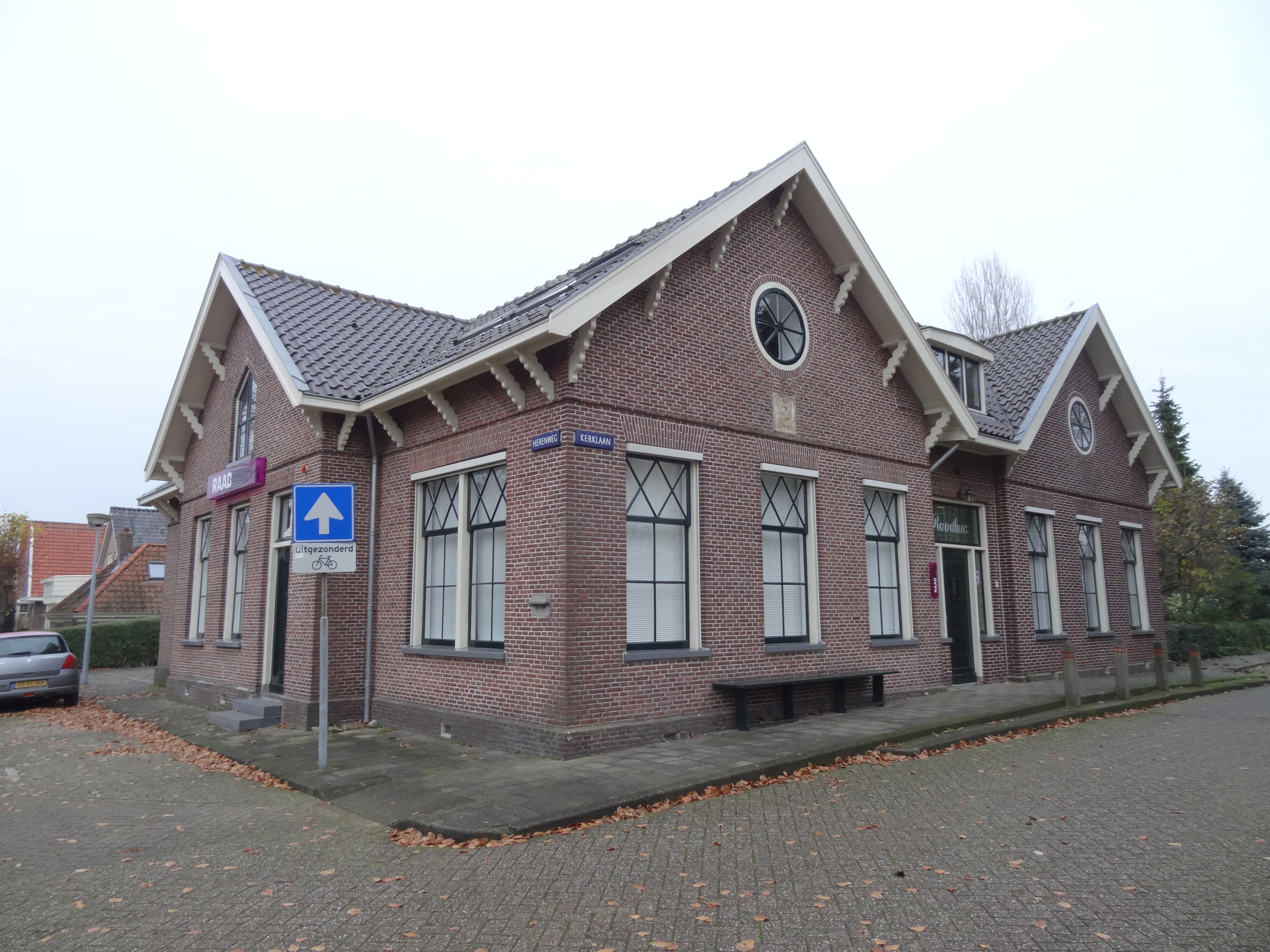
Former town hall
