= Marink Reedijk =

Dutch football coach (born 1992)

Personal information
- Date of birth: 25 August 1992 (age 34)

Team information
- Current team: Hibernian (head coach)

Managerial career
- Years: Team
- 2023–2024: RSCA Futures
- 2024–2026: Beveren
- 2026–: Hibernian

Marink Reedijk (born 25 August 1992) is a Dutch football coach who is the head coach of Scottish club Hibernian.

== Career ==
After working with Roeselare, Ajax, West Bromwich Albion and Vitesse, Reedijk became head coach of Belgian club RSCA Futures in June 2023, replacing Guillaume Gillet. He said his dream was to manage in the Champions League.

In June 2024 he became manager of Beveren. In the 2025–26 season, Beveren earned promotion to the top tier, and concluded the season undefeated, the first time it happened in Belgian football since 1934. Nevertheless, he left Beveren at the end of the season.

On 24 September 2026, Scottish club Hibernian announced Reedijk as their new first team manager. He replaced David Gray, who was sacked 8 days earlier after a disappointing start to the season. His first match was a 1–0 loss.
