= Scottish Premiership =

Scottish association football league

- Organising bodies: SPFL
- Founded: 2013; 13 years ago
- Country: Scotland
- Confederation: UEFA
- Number of clubs: 12
- Level on pyramid: 1
- Relegation to: Scottish Championship
- Domestic cup: Scottish Cup
- League cup: Scottish League Cup
- International cup(s): UEFA Champions League; UEFA Europa League; UEFA Conference League
- Current champions: Celtic (Note: The Scottish Premiership has only existed since 2013. For a complete record of clubs that have won Scottish league championships, see list of Scottish football champions.) (2025–26)
- Most championships: Celtic (12 titles)
- Broadcasters: Sky Sports; Premier Sports; BBC Alba; BBC Scotland; List of international broadcasters
- Website: spfl.co.uk
- Current: 2026–27 Scottish Premiership

The Scottish Premiership, also known as the William Hill Premiership for sponsorship reasons, is a professional association football league in Scotland and the highest level of the Scottish football league system. The top division of the Scottish Professional Football League (SPFL), the Scottish Premiership was established in July 2013, after the SPFL was formed by a merger of the Scottish Premier League and Scottish Football League. There are 12 teams in this division, with each team playing 38 matches per season. Seventeen clubs have played in the Scottish Premiership since its creation in the 2013–14 season.

== Competition format ==
Teams receive three points for a win and one point for a draw. No points are awarded for a loss. Teams are ranked by total points, then goal difference, and then goals scored. At the end of each season, the club with the most points is crowned league champion. If the points, goal difference, goals scored, and head-to-head results between teams are equal, a play-off game held at a neutral venue shall be played to determine the final placings. The play-off will only occur when the position of the teams affects the outcome of the title, European qualification, relegation, or second stage group allocation and shall not occur otherwise.

=== Split ===
The top flight of Scottish football has contained 12 clubs since the 2000–01 season, the longest period without change in the history of the Scottish football league system. During this period the Scottish Premier League, and now the Scottish Premiership, has operated a "split" format, that is, split in two phases as is explained below. This is used to prevent the need for a 44-game schedule, based on playing each other four times. That format was used in the Scottish Premier Division in the mid-1980s and early 1990s, but it is now too high a number of games in a league season.

A season, which runs from August until May, is divided into two phases. During the first phase, each club plays three games against every other team, either once at home and twice away or vice versa. After this first phase of matches, by which time all clubs have played 33 games, the league splits into two halves – a "top six" section and a "bottom six" section. Each club plays a further five matches, one against each of the other five teams in their own section. Points achieved during the first phase of 33 matches are carried forward to the second phase, but the teams compete only within their own sections during the second phase. After the first phase is completed, clubs cannot move out of their own half in the league, even if they achieve more or fewer points than a higher or lower ranked team, respectively.

At the beginning of each season, the SPFL 'predicts' the likely positions of each club in order to produce a fixture schedule that ensures the best possible chance of all clubs playing each other twice at home and twice away. This is known as the league 'seeding' and is based on clubs' performance in the previous season. If the clubs do not finish in the half where they are predicted to finish, then anomalies can be created in the fixture list. Clubs sometimes play another three times at home and once away (or vice versa), or a club can end up playing 20 home (or away) games in a season.

=== Promotion and relegation ===
The bottom placed Premiership club at the end of the season is relegated and swaps places with the winner of the Scottish Championship, provided that the winner satisfies Premiership entry criteria. With the creation of the SPFL, promotion and relegation play-offs involving the top flight were introduced for the first time in seventeen years. The Premiership club in eleventh place plays the Championship play-off winners over two legs, with the winner earning the right to play in the Scottish Premiership the following season. This enables two clubs to be relegated from the Premiership each season, with two being promoted. Prior to the creation of the Scottish Premiership, only a single club could be relegated each season – with only the second tier champions being promoted. The Scottish Football League had used play-offs amongst its three divisions since 2007.

=== European qualification ===
UEFA country coefficient 2021–26
| Rank | Association | Coefficient |
|---|---|---|
| 16 | Switzerland | 31.700 |
| 17 | Cyprus | 29.787 |
| 18 | Scotland | 29.050 |
| 19 | Sweden | 28.872 |
| 20 | Israel | 27.500 |

UEFA grants European places to the Scottish Football Association, determined by Scotland's position in the UEFA country coefficient rankings. The Scottish Football Association in turn allocates a number of these European places to final Scottish Premiership positions. At the end of the 2020–21 season, Scotland was ranked 11th in Europe—granting them two teams in the UEFA Champions League, one team in the UEFA Europa League, and two teams in the UEFA Europa Conference League.

At the end of the 2022–23 season, the Scottish Premiership winners (Celtic FC) gained qualification to the UEFA Champions League group stage, whilst the second placed team (Rangers FC) entered at the third qualifying round. The third placed team (Aberdeen FC) entered the Europa League in the playoff round, while the fourth place (Heart Of Midlothian FC) got UEFA Europa Conference League 3rd Qualifying Round and fifth place (Hibernian FC) got UEFA Europa Conference League 2nd Qualifying Round.

Scotland's place in the Europa League is awarded to the winners of the Scottish Cup. Should the winners of that competition have already qualified for European competition, then the fifth placed team also enters the Europa Conference League second qualifying round, while third placed team (unless they are cup winners themselves) are promoted from Europa Conference League to the Europa League third qualifying round.

=== Financial disparity ===
The 2017 'Global Sports Salaries Survey' report found a large variation between the wages offered by teams in the Scottish Premiership, with champions Celtic paying an average annual salary of £735,040, per player, whilst traditional rivals Rangers could only pay £329,600 and league runners-up Aberdeen offered £136,382. The lowest salary offered by any of the twelve member clubs was Hamilton's £41,488—one seventeenth that of Celtic, whose wages were close to the sum of the other eleven clubs combined.

The report stated that this disparity was the third-greatest from the 18 leagues surveyed, and that the Scottish Premiership offered the third-lowest salaries of those leagues; by contrast, Celtic's opponents in the Champions League that year paid average wages of £6.5m (Paris Saint-Germain) and £5.2m (Bayern Munich), seven times higher than the Scottish club.

== Clubs ==
The 12 clubs listed below will compete in the Scottish Premiership during the 2025–26 season.

| Club | Location | Position in 2025–26 | First season in top division | No. of seasons in top division | First season of current spell in top division | No. of seasons of current spell | National titles | Last title |
|---|---|---|---|---|---|---|---|---|
| Aberdeen | Aberdeen | 9th, Scottish Premiership | 1905–06 | 115 | 1905–06 | 115 | 4 | 1984–85 |
| Celtic | Glasgow (Parkhead) | 1st, Scottish Premiership (champions) | 1890–91 | 130 | 1890–91 | 130 | 56 | 2025–26 |
| Dundee | Dundee | 8th, Scottish Premiership | 1893–94 | 102 | 2023–24 | 4 | 1 | 1961–62 |
| Dundee United | Dundee | 7th, Scottish Premiership | 1925–26 | 65 | 2024–25 | 3 | 1 | 1982–83 |
| Falkirk | Falkirk | 6th, Scottish Premiership | 1905–06 | 69 | 2025–26 | 2 | — | — |
| Heart of Midlothian | Edinburgh (Gorgie) | 2nd, Scottish Premiership | 1890–91 | 124 | 2021–22 | 6 | 4 | 1959–60 |
| Hibernian | Edinburgh (Leith) | 5th, Scottish Premiership | 1895–96 | 120 | 2017–18 | 10 | 4 | 1951–52 |
| Kilmarnock | Kilmarnock | 10th, Scottish Premiership | 1899–1900 | 97 | 2022–23 | 5 | 1 | 1964–65 |
| Motherwell | Motherwell | 4th, Scottish Premiership | 1903–04 | 111 | 1985–86 | 42 | 1 | 1931–32 |
| Rangers | Glasgow (Ibrox) | 3rd, Scottish Premiership | 1890–91 | 126 | 2016–17 | 11 | 55 | 2020–21 |
| St Johnstone | Perth | 1st Scottish Championship (promoted) | 1924–25 | 55 | 2026–27 | 1 | — | — |
| St Mirren | Paisley | 11th, Scottish Premiership | 1890–91 | 116 | 2018–19 | 9 | — | — |

Location of teams in the **2026–27 Scottish Premiership**
Premiership football clubs in Dundee
Premiership football clubs in Edinburgh
Premiership football clubs in Glasgow

| Aberdeen | Celtic | Dundee | Dundee United | Falkirk | Heart of Midlothian |
|---|---|---|---|---|---|
| Pittodrie Stadium | Celtic Park | Dens Park | Tannadice Park | Falkirk Stadium | Tynecastle Park |
| Capacity: **20,866** | Capacity: **60,411** | Capacity: **11,775** | Capacity: **14,223** | Capacity: **7,937** | Capacity: **19,852** |

| Hibernian | Kilmarnock | Motherwell | Rangers | St Johnstone | St Mirren |
|---|---|---|---|---|---|
| Easter Road | Rugby Park | Fir Park | Ibrox Stadium | McDiarmid Park | St Mirren Park |
| Capacity: **20,421** | Capacity: **15,003** | Capacity: **13,677** | Capacity: **51,700** | Capacity: **10,696** | Capacity: **7,937** |

Club ranking

UEFA 5-year Club Ranking after 2024/25 season:

- 25. Rangers (71.250)
- 59. Celtic (38.000)
- 138. Heart of Midlothian (11.500)
- 161. Aberdeen (9.500)
- 205. Kilmarnock (2.500)
- 206 St Mirren (2.000)
- 207. Hibernian (4.500)
- 208. Dundee United (2.000)
- 209. Motherwell (3.500)
- 210. St Johnstone (2.500)

=== Seasons in Scottish top flight ===
There are 46 teams that have taken part in 130 Scottish top flight championships (the Scottish Football League Division One, Scottish Football League Premier Division, Scottish Premier League, and Scottish Premiership) that were played from the 1890–91 season until the 2026–27 season. The teams in bold compete in the Scottish Premiership currently, while the teams in italics have never competed in the Scottish Premiership. The year in parentheses represents the most recent year of participation at this level. Celtic is the only team that has played Scottish top flight football in every season.

- **130** seasons: **Celtic** (2027)
- **126** seasons: **Rangers** (2027)
- **124** seasons: **Heart of Midlothian** (2027)
- **118** seasons: **Hibernian** (2027)
- **113** seasons: **Aberdeen** (2027)
- **111** seasons: **Motherwell** (2027)
- **106** seasons: **St Mirren** (2027)
- **102** seasons: **Dundee** (2027)
- **98** seasons: **Kilmarnock** (2027)
- **85** seasons: Partick Thistle (2018)
- **70** seasons: **Falkirk** (2027)
- **65** seasons: **Dundee United** (2027)
- **63** seasons: Clyde (1975)
- **60** seasons: Airdrieonians (1993)
- **58** seasons: Third Lanark (1965)
- **55** seasons: **St Johnstone** (2027)
- **54** seasons: Greenock Morton (1988)
- **48** seasons: Hamilton Academical (2021)
- **42** seasons: Queen's Park (1958)
- **38** seasons: Dunfermline Athletic (2012)
- **37** seasons: Raith Rovers (1997)
- **35** seasons: Ayr United (1978)
- **20** seasons: Queen of the South (1964)
- **19** seasons: Dumbarton (1985)
- **14** seasons: East Fife (1974)
- **12** seasons: Inverness Caledonian Thistle (2017), Ross County (2025), Livingston (2026)
- **11** seasons: Stirling Albion (1968), Cowdenbeath (1971)
- **9** seasons: Albion Rovers (1949), Arbroath (1975)
- **8** seasons: Port Glasgow Athletic (1910)
- **7** seasons: St Bernard's (1900), Clydebank (1914) (1926)
- **6** seasons: Leith Athletic (1932)
- **4** seasons: Renton (1894), Abercorn (1897)
- **3** seasons: Clydebank (1965) (1987)
- **2** seasons: Cambuslang (1892), Vale of Leven (1892), East Stirlingshire (1964)
- **1** season: Cowlairs (1891), Alloa Athletic (1923), Bo'ness (1928), Gretna (2008)

=== Seasons in Scottish Premiership ===
There are 17 teams that have taken part in 14 Scottish Premiership championships that were played from the 2013–14 season until the 2026–27 season. The teams in bold compete in the Scottish Premiership currently. The year in parentheses represents the most recent year of participation at this level. Aberdeen, Celtic, and Motherwell are the only teams that have played Scottish Premiership football in every season.

- **14** seasons: **Aberdeen** (2027), **Celtic** (2027), **Motherwell** (2027)
- **13** seasons: **Kilmarnock** (2027), **St Johnstone** (2027)
- **12** seasons: **Heart of Midlothian** (2027)
- **11** seasons: Ross County (2025), **Hibernian** (2027), **Rangers** (2027), **St Mirren** (2027)
- **10** seasons: **Dundee** (2027)
- **9** seasons: **Dundee United** (2027)
- **7** seasons: Hamilton Academical (2021), Livingston (2026)
- **5** seasons: Partick Thistle (2018)
- **4** seasons: Inverness Caledonian Thistle (2017)
- **2** seasons: **Falkirk** (2027)

== Managers ==
Italics indicate interim managers.

Current Scottish Premiership managers
| Manager | Nationality | Club | Appointed | Time as manager |
|---|---|---|---|---|
| John McGlynn | Scotland | Falkirk | 4 May 2022 | 4 years, 200 days |
| Jim Goodwin | Ireland | Dundee United | 1 March 2023 | 3 years, 264 days |
| Simo Valakari | Finland | St Johnstone | 1 October 2024 | 2 years, 50 days |
| Steven Pressley | Scotland | Dundee | 2 June 2025 | 1 year, 171 days |
| Martin O'Neill | Northern Ireland | Celtic | 5 January 2026 | 319 days |
| Neil McCann | Scotland | Kilmarnock | 6 January 2026 | 318 days |
| Stephen Robinson | Northern Ireland | Aberdeen | 12 March 2026 | 253 days |
| Craig McLeish | Scotland | St Mirren | 12 March 2026 | 253 days |
| Derek McInnes | Scotland | Rangers | 17 June 2026 | 156 days |
| Alfred Johansson | Sweden | Motherwell | 18 June 2026 | 155 days |
| Wouter Vrancken | Belgium | Heart of Midlothian | 25 June 2026 | 148 days |
| Marink Reedijk | Netherlands | Hibernian | 24 September 2026 | 57 days |

== Statistics ==
=== Championships ===
| Season | Winners | Runners-up | Third place | Tartan Boot | Players' Player of the Year | Writers' Player of the Year | SPFL Premiership Player of the Year |
|---|---|---|---|---|---|---|---|
| 2013–14 | Celtic | Motherwell | Aberdeen | Kris Commons, **27** (Celtic) | Kris Commons (Celtic) | Kris Commons (Celtic) | Not awarded |
| 2014–15 | Celtic | Aberdeen | Inverness CT | Adam Rooney, **20** (Aberdeen) | Stefan Johansen (Celtic) | Craig Gordon (Celtic) | Not awarded |
| 2015–16 | Celtic | Aberdeen | Heart of Midlothian | Leigh Griffiths, **31** (Celtic) | Leigh Griffiths (Celtic) | Leigh Griffiths (Celtic) | Leigh Griffiths (Celtic) |
| 2016–17 | Celtic | Aberdeen | Rangers | Liam Boyce, **23** (Ross County) | Scott Sinclair (Celtic) | Scott Sinclair (Celtic) | Scott Brown (Celtic) |
| 2017–18 | Celtic | Aberdeen | Rangers | Kris Boyd, **18** (Kilmarnock) | Scott Brown (Celtic) | Scott Brown (Celtic) | Scott Brown (Celtic) |
| 2018–19 | Celtic | Rangers | Kilmarnock | Alfredo Morelos, **18** (Rangers) | James Forrest (Celtic) | James Forrest (Celtic) | James Forrest (Celtic) |
| 2019–20 (Note: The 2019–20 Scottish Premiership was suspended in March 2020 due to the COVID-19 pandemic in Scotland. The season was subsequently curtailed on 18 May 2020 and a points per game average was used to calculate a final table.) | Celtic | Rangers | Motherwell | Odsonne Édouard, **22** (Celtic) | Not awarded | Odsonne Édouard (Celtic) | Not awarded |
| 2020–21 | Rangers | Celtic | Hibernian | Odsonne Édouard, **18** (Celtic) | James Tavernier (Rangers) | Steven Davis (Rangers) | Allan McGregor (Rangers) |
| 2021–22 | Celtic | Rangers | Heart of Midlothian | Regan Charles-Cook, **13** (Ross County); Giorgos Giakoumakis, **13** (Celtic) | Callum McGregor (Celtic) | Craig Gordon (Heart of Midlothian) | Craig Gordon (Heart of Midlothian) |
| 2022–23 | Celtic | Rangers | Aberdeen | Kyōgo Furuhashi, **27** (Celtic) | Kyōgo Furuhashi (Celtic) | Kyōgo Furuhashi (Celtic) | Kyōgo Furuhashi (Celtic) |
| 2023–24 | Celtic | Rangers | Heart of Midlothian | Lawrence Shankland, **24** (Heart of Midlothian) | Lawrence Shankland (Heart of Midlothian) | Lawrence Shankland (Heart of Midlothian) | Lawrence Shankland (Heart of Midlothian) |
| 2024–25 | Celtic | Rangers | Hibernian | Cyriel Dessers, **18** (Rangers) | Daizen Maeda (Celtic) | Daizen Maeda (Celtic) | Daizen Maeda (Celtic) |
| 2025–26 | Celtic | Heart of Midlothian | Rangers | Tawanda Maswanhise, **17** (Motherwell) | Cláudio Braga (Heart of Midlothian) | Cláudio Braga (Heart of Midlothian) | Cláudio Braga (Heart of Midlothian) |

As of 2026, Scotland's top-flight league championship has been won 56 times by Celtic and 55 times by Rangers. Nine other clubs have won the remaining 19 championships, with three clubs tied for third place with 4 apiece. The last time the championship was won by a club other than Rangers or Celtic was in 1984–85, by Aberdeen.

=== Records and awards ===
Biggest home win
Rangers 8–0 Hamilton Academical, 8 November 2020
Biggest away win
Dundee United 0–9 Celtic, 28 August 2022
Most goals in a game
Hibernian 5–5 Rangers, 13 May 2018
Most points in a season
106; Celtic, 2016–17
Fewest points in a season
21; Dundee, 2018–19; Livingston, 2025–26
Most wins in a season
34; Celtic, 2016–17
Fewest wins in a season
2; Livingston, 2025–26
Most draws in a season
15; Dundee, 2015–16; Dundee United, 2025–26
Fewest draws in a season
3; St Mirren, 2014–15; Celtic, 2022–23; Aberdeen, 2022–23
Most defeats in a season
27; Dundee, 2018–19
Fewest defeats in a season
0; Celtic, 2016–17; Rangers, 2020–21
Most goals scored in a season
114; Celtic, 2022–23
Fewest goals scored in a season
24; St Johnstone, 2021–22 (Note: St Mirren scored 24 goals in the curtailed 2019–20 season.)
Most goals conceded in a season
78; Dundee, 2018–19
Fewest goals conceded in a season
13; Rangers, 2020–21
Fastest goal
Kris Boyd, for Kilmarnock against Ross County, 10 seconds, 28 January 2017
Highest transfer fee paid
Arne Engels, from FC Augsburg to Celtic, £10.8 million, 30 August 2024
Highest transfer fee received
Matt O'Riley, from Celtic to Brighton, £30 million, 26 August 2024
Most hat-tricks
Liam Boyce and Leigh Griffiths, 4 each
Youngest player
Dylan Reid, for St Mirren v Rangers, 16 years and 5 days, 6 March 2021
Youngest goalscorer
Jack Aitchison, for Celtic v Motherwell, 16 years and 71 days
Longest-serving manager
David Martindale, for Livingston, 26 November 2020 – 1 February 2026

=== Top scorers ===
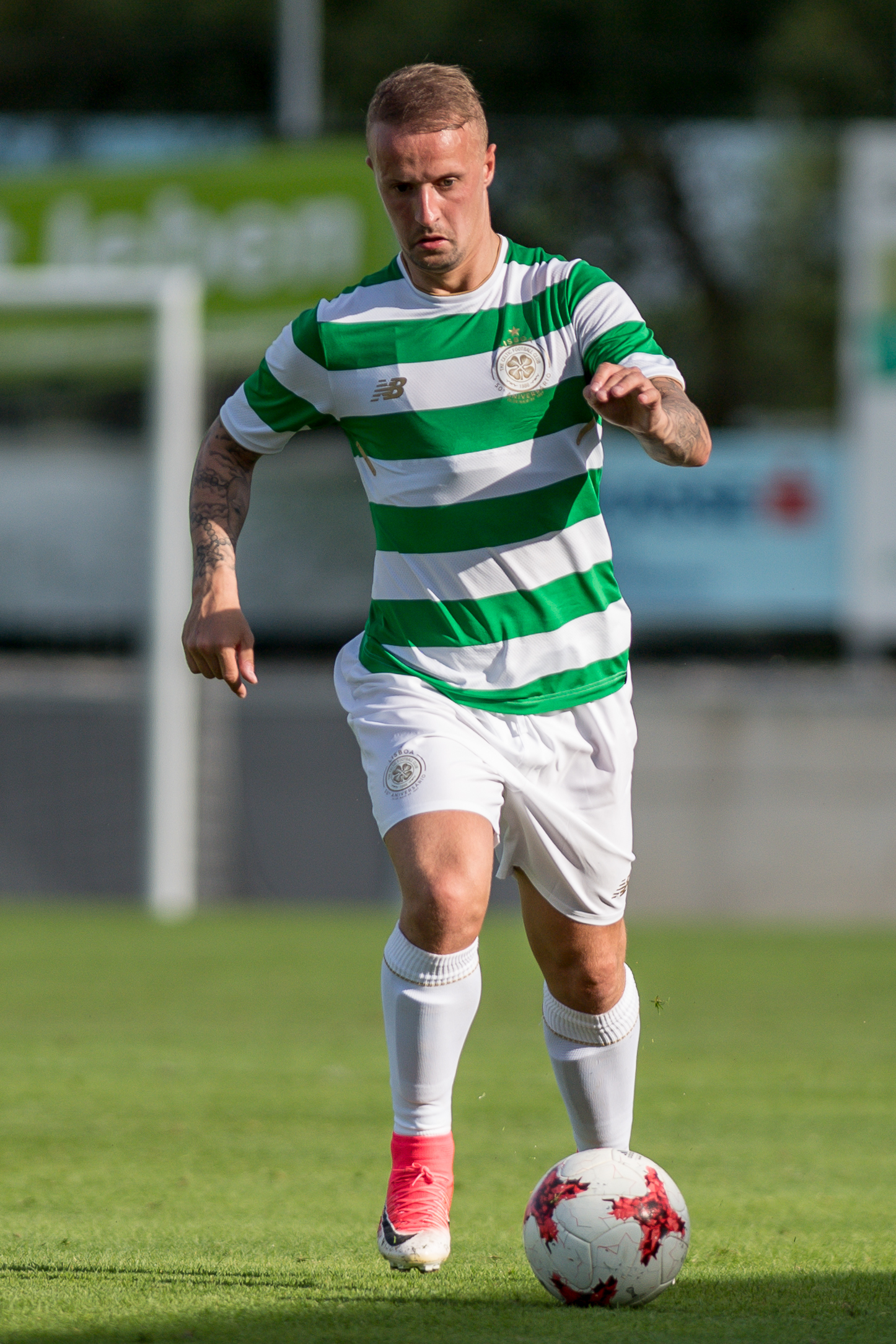
Leigh Griffiths, the Scottish Premiership's all-time joint top goalscorer

- **Bold** shows players still playing in the Scottish Premiership.
- Italics show players still playing professional football in other leagues.

As of matches played on 03 September 2026

| Rank | Player | Goals | Apps | Ratio | First | Last | Club(s) (goals/apps) | Notes |
|---|---|---|---|---|---|---|---|---|
| 1 | (Scotland) Leigh Griffiths | 92 | 188 | 0.49 | 2014 | 2022 | Celtic (90/173), Dundee (2/15) | (Note: Player also scored goal(s) in the Scottish Premier League.) |
| 1 | (England) James Tavernier | 92 | 346 | 0.27 | 2016 | 2026 | Rangers | |
| 3 | (Scotland) **Lawrence Shankland** | 83 | 189 | 0.44 | 2013 | 2026 | Aberdeen (0/17), Dundee United (8/33), Heart of Midlothian (72/135), **Rangers** (3/4) | |
| 4 | (Colombia) Alfredo Morelos | 78 | 178 | 0.44 | 2017 | 2023 | Rangers | |
| 5 | (Australia) **Martin Boyle** | 68 | 264 | 0.26 | 2014 | 2026 | Dundee (0/18), **Hibernian** (68/246) | |
| 6 | (France) Odsonne Édouard | 66 | 116 | 0.57 | 2017 | 2021 | Celtic | |
| 6 | (Republic of Ireland) Adam Rooney | 66 | 151 | 0.44 | 2014 | 2018 | Aberdeen | |
| 8 | (Japan) Kyōgo Furuhashi | 63 | 116 | 0.54 | 2021 | 2025 | Celtic | |
| 9 | (Northern Ireland) Liam Boyce | 62 | 166 | 0.37 | 2014 | 2025 | Ross County (48/99), Heart of Midlothian (14/67) | |
| 10 | (Scotland) **James Forrest** | 60 | 302 | 0.2 | 2013 | 2026 | **Celtic** | |

== Broadcasting rights ==
The SPFL's domestic TV broadcast deal currently ranks 16th in Europe among European leagues.

| Country/region | Broadcaster | Language | Summary |
|---|---|---|---|
| United Kingdom | Sky Sports | English | Up to 60 live Premiership matches per season from 2024 to 2029 and the play-off final. Saturday-night goal highlights on Sky Sports News. |
| United Kingdom | Premier Sports | English | 20 live Premiership pre-split matches per season from 2024 to 2029 and 2 live bottom six post-split matches from 2025 to 2029. This is in addition to live Scottish Cup, Scottish League Cup. |
| United Kingdom | BBC Sport Scotland | English | Saturday-night Scottish Premiership Highlights of matches from that day. Extended Sunday-night Scottish Premiership highlights with full weekend review, 30 live Friday-night Scottish Championship matches, the Scottish Premiership Play-Off quarter-final and semi-final, and every Scotland Men's National Team match matches live, until the 2026 FIFA World Cup. Friday night magazine programme A View from the Terrace. Online and social media highlights also. |
| United Kingdom | STV | English | Goal clips during the sport section of their STV News at Six programme. |
| United Kingdom | BBC Alba | Gaelic | 38 delayed matches on Saturday evenings, 10 live League one matches and live Championship and League One playoff matches. |
| Worldwide | YouTube | English (N/A) | 6–10 minute highlights of all Premiership matches as well as Championship, League One and League Two goals available without commentary/narration via the SPFL YouTube channel. |

=== International ===
| Country/region | Broadcaster |
|---|---|
| Albania | Tring Sport |
| Australia | beIN Sports |
| New Zealand | beIN Sports |
| Armenia | Setanta Sports |
| Azerbaijan | Setanta Sports |
| Belarus | Setanta Sports |
| Estonia | Setanta Sports |
| Georgia | Setanta Sports |
| Kazakhstan | Setanta Sports |
| Kyrgyzstan | Setanta Sports |
| Latvia | Setanta Sports |
| Lithuania | Setanta Sports |
| Moldova | Setanta Sports |
| Tajikistan | Setanta Sports |
| Uzbekistan | Setanta Sports |
| Ukraine | Setanta Sports |
| Austria | Sportdigital |
| Bosnia and Herzegovina | Arena Sport |
| Croatia | Arena Sport |
| Montenegro | Arena Sport |
| North Macedonia | Arena Sport |
| Serbia | Arena Sport |
| Slovenia | Arena Sport |
| Brazil | Canal GOAT |
| Caribbean | ESPN |
| China | Zhibo.tv |
| Czech Republic | Premier Sport |
| Slovakia | Premier Sport |
| Denmark | Viaplay |
| Finland | Viaplay |
| Iceland | Viaplay |
| Norway | Viaplay |
| Sweden | Viaplay |
| Germany | Sportdigital |
| Greece | Cosmote Sport |
| Hungary | Arena4 |
| Ireland | Sky Sports |
| Israel | Sport 5 |
| Italy | Como TV |
| Latin America | ESPN |
| Liechtenstein | Sport1 |
| MENA | Sharjah Sports |
| Netherlands | Ziggo Sport |
| Poland | Polsat Sport |
| Portugal | Sport TV |
| Romania | Digi Sport |
| Russia | Match TV |
| Sub-Saharan Africa | ESPN |
| Switzerland | Sportdigital |
| Taiwan | ELTA |
| Thailand | True Sports |
| Turkey | S Sport, TRT Spor |
| United States | CBS Sports Network / Paramount+ |
| Puerto Rico | CBS Sports Network / Paramount+ |

== See also ==
- List of association football competitions
- List of professional sports teams in the United Kingdom
- Scottish Women's Premier League
- Premier League, the top tier of men's football in England
