= 2025–26 Heart of Midlothian F.C. season =

Heart of Midlothian
2025–26 season
- Chairman: Ann Budge (until 1 December 2025); Calum Paterson
- Head Coach: Derek McInnes
- Stadium: Tynecastle Park
- Premiership: Second place
- Scottish Cup: Fourth round, lost to Falkirk
- League Cup: Second round, lost to St Mirren
- Top goalscorer: League: Lawrence Shankland (16); All: Lawrence Shankland (20)
- Highest home attendance: 18,919 vs. Falkirk, Premiership, 27 September 2025
- Lowest home attendance: 8,722, vs. Dumbarton, League Cup, 23 July 2025
- Average home league attendance: 18,743
Home colours	Away colours	Third colours

The 2025–26 season was the 145th season of competitive football by Heart of Midlothian. They took part in the Scottish Premiership, the Scottish League Cup and the Scottish Cup.

== Results and fixtures ==
Win Draw Loss Postponed

=== Pre-season / friendlies ===
2 July 2025 Friendly	Heart of Midlothian	1–1	St Mirren	Pinatar Arena
	Baningime 37'	Report	Mooney 13'
Note: Closed doors friendly.

4 July 2025 Friendly	Heart of Midlothian	3–1	Crawley Town	Pinatar Arena
18:00	4' (o.g.); Forrest 20'; Wilson 69'	Report	Flower 21'
Note: Closed doors friendly.

8 July 2025 Friendly	East Kilbride	0–8	Heart of Midlothian	K-Park Training Academy
19:45		Report	Wilson 15'; Braga 22'; Dhanda 57'; Spittal 60'; Kabangu 62', 72'; Drammeh 68'; Kartum 79'
Note: Closed doors friendly.

26 July 2025 Craig Gordon Testimonial	Heart of Midlothian	3–0	Sunderland	Tynecastle Park
15:00	Braga; Shankland; Kyziridis	Hearts Report		Attendance: 17,756; Referee: Robertson
Note: Testimonial match for Craig Gordon

=== Scottish Premiership ===
4 August 2025 1	Heart of Midlothian	2–0	Aberdeen	Edinburgh
20:00	Shinnie 11' (o.g.); Findlay 73'			Stadium: Tynecastle Park; Attendance: 18,677; Referee: Walsh

10 August 2025 2	Dundee United	2–3	Heart of Midlothian	Dundee
15:00	Dolček 22', 41'		Shankland 19' (pen.); Findlay 58', 90+4'	Stadium: Tannadice Park; Attendance: 10,874; Referee: Dickinson

23 August 2025 3	Heart of Midlothian	3–3	Motherwell	Edinburgh
15:00	Milne 65'; Braga 74', 83'		Slattery 21'; Maswanhise 49'; Longelo 62'	Stadium: Tynecastle Park; Attendance: 18,717; Referee: Beaton

30 August 2025 4	Livingston	1–2	Heart of Midlothian	Livingston
15:00	Smith 26'		Braga 47'; Kyziridis 90+1'	Stadium: Almondvale Stadium; Attendance: 7,770; Referee: Nicolson

13 September 2025 5	Rangers	0–2	Heart of Midlothian	Glasgow
15:00 BST		Report	Shankland 21', (penalty missed) 82', 82'	Stadium: Ibrox Stadium; Attendance: 50,697; Referee: McLean

27 September 2025 6	Heart of Midlothian	3–0	Falkirk	Edinburgh
15:00	Kyziridis 22'; Shankland 41'; Halkett 48'			Stadium: Tynecastle Park; Attendance: 18,919; Referee: Wilson

4 October 2025 7	Heart of Midlothian	1–0	Hibernian	Edinburgh
17:45	Halkett 90+1'			Stadium: Tynecastle Park; Attendance: 18,760; Referee: Dickinson

18 October 2025 8	Kilmarnock	0–3	Heart of Midlothian	Kilmarnock
17:45 BST			Halkett 19'; Braga 57', 61'	Stadium: Rugby Park; Attendance: 9,026; Referee: Hardie

26 October 2025 9	Heart of Midlothian	3–1	Celtic	Edinburgh
12:00 GMT	Murray 8' (o.g.); Kyziridis 52'; Shankland 55' (pen.)		McGregor 12'	Stadium: Tynecastle Park; Attendance: 18,774; Referee: Steven McLean

29 October 2025 10	St Mirren	2–2	Heart of Midlothian	Paisley
19:45 BST	Nlundulu 28'; Freckleton 55'	Report	Shankland 34'; Braga 70'	Stadium: St Mirren Park; Attendance: 7,105; Referee: MacDermid

1 November 2025 11	Heart of Midlothian	4–0	Dundee	Edinburgh
15:00	Shankland 31'; Kaboré 38', 56'; Magnússon 79'			Stadium: Tynecastle Park; Attendance: 18,767; Referee: Clancy

9 November 2025 12	Heart of Midlothian	1–1	Dundee United	Edinburgh
15:00	Kucherenko 25' (o.g.)	Report	Stephenson 45'	Stadium: Tynecastle Park; Attendance: 18,755; Referee: Beaton

23 November 2025 13	Aberdeen	1–0	Heart of Midlothian	Aberdeen
15:00	Keskinen 39'	Report		Stadium: Pittodrie Stadium; Attendance: 17,850; Referee: Dickinson

29 November 2025 14	Motherwell	0–0	Heart of Midlothian	Motherwell
15:00 GMT (UTC)		Report		Stadium: Fir Park; Attendance: 10,938; Referee: Clancy

3 December 2025 15	Heart of Midlothian	1–1	Kilmarnock	Edinburgh
17:45	Shankland 49'		Anderson 90'	Stadium: Tynecastle Park; Attendance: 18,508; Referee: Beaton

7 December 2025 16	Celtic	1–2	Heart of Midlothian	Glasgow
15:00	Tierney 90+3'	Report	Braga 43'; McEntee 64'	Stadium: Celtic Park; Attendance: 58,794; Referee: Robertson

13 December 2025 20	Falkirk	0–2	Heart of Midlothian	Falkirk
20:00		BBC Report	Braga 2'; Kingsley 77'	Stadium: Falkirk Stadium; Attendance: 7,538; Referee: Scott

21 December 2025 18	Heart of Midlothian	2–1	Rangers	Edinburgh
13:30	Findlay 38'; Shankland 42'	BBC Report	Chermiti 90+5'	Stadium: Tynecastle Park; Attendance: 18,829; Referee: Walsh

27 December 2025 19	Hibernian	3–2	Heart of Midlothian	Edinburgh
12:30	McGrath 3'; Campbell 45'; Bowie 48'	Report	Shankland 75'; Devlin 89'	Stadium: Easter Road; Attendance: 20,035; Referee: Beaton

3 January 2026 21	Heart of Midlothian	1–0	Livingston	Edinburgh
15:00	Halkett 18'	BBC Report		Stadium: Tynecastle Park; Attendance: 18,504; Referee: Graham

11 January 2026 22	Dundee	0–1	Heart of Midlothian	Dundee
14:00		Report	Braga 27'; Schwolow (red card) 45+5'	Stadium: Dens Park; Attendance: 8,525; Referee: Lee

14 January 2026 17	Heart of Midlothian	2–0	St Mirren	Edinburgh
19:45	Baningime (red card) 15'; Shankland 60'; Magnússon 80'	BBC Report		Stadium: Tynecastle Park; Attendance: 18,410; Referee: Clancy

25 January 2026 23	Heart of Midlothian	2–2	Celtic	Edinburgh
15:00 GMT	Findlay 48'; Braga 87'	Report	Nygren 7'; Yang 62'; Trusty (red card) 77'	Stadium: Tynecastle Park; Attendance: 18,859; Referee: McLean

31 January 2026 24	Dundee United	0–3	Heart of Midlothian	Dundee
20:00	Fatah (red card) 24'; Camará (red card) 75'	Report	Kaboré 11', 81'; Kyziridis 29' (pen.)	Stadium: Tannadice Park; Attendance: 11,627; Referee: Scott

3 February 2026 25	St Mirren	1–0	Heart of Midlothian	Paisley
19:45 BST	Freckleton 88'	Report	Halkett (red card) 29'	Stadium: St Mirren Park; Attendance: 7,151; Referee: McLean

10 February 2026 26	Heart of Midlothian	1–0	Hibernian	Edinburgh
20:00 GMT	Magnússon 88'	Report		Stadium: Tynecastle Park; Attendance: 18,766; Referee: Walsh

15 February 2026 27	Rangers	4–2	Heart of Midlothian	Glasgow
16:30 GMT	Steinwender 19' (o.g.); Chermiti 39', 57', 90'	Report	Leonard 16'; Braga 30'	Stadium: Ibrox Stadium; Attendance: 51,092; Referee: Robertson

21 February 2026 28	Heart of Midlothian	1–0	Falkirk	Edinburgh
15:00 GMT	Chesnokov 45'	Report		Stadium: Tynecastle Park; Attendance: 18,820; Referee: Nicolson

28 February 2026 29	Heart of Midlothian	1–0	Aberdeen	Edinburgh
15:00 GMT	Braga 28'	Report		Stadium: Tynecastle Park; Attendance: 18,788; Referee: Clancy

14 March 2026 30	Kilmarnock	1–0	Heart of Midlothian	Kilmarnock
16:30 GMT	Schjønning-Larsen 17'	Report		Stadium: Rugby Park; Attendance: 8,232; Referee: Dickinson

21 March 2026 31	Heart of Midlothian	1–0	Dundee	Edinburgh
15:00 GMT	McEntee 77'; Kent (yellow card) (yellow-red card) 90+1'	Report		Stadium: Tynecastle Park; Attendance: 18,827; Referee: Robertson

5 April 2026 32	Livingston	2–2	Heart of Midlothian	Livingston
14:00 GMT	May 5'; Smith 58'	BBC Report	Shankland 24'; Braga 51'; Leonard (red card) 90+6'	Stadium: Almondvale Stadium; Attendance: 8,952; Referee: Clancy

11 April 2026 33	Heart of Midlothian	3–1	Motherwell	Edinburgh
15:00	Braga 61'; Shankland 87' (pen.); Kaboré 90+2'		Longelo 50'	Stadium: Tynecastle Park; Attendance: 18,800; Referee: MacDermid

26 April 2026 34	Hibernian	1–2	Heart of Midlothian	Edinburgh
16:30	Boyle 7'; Sallinger (red card) 14'; Passlack (yellow card) (yellow-red card) 48'	Report	O'Hora 65' (o.g.); Spittal 86'	Stadium: Easter Road; Attendance: 19,502; Referee: Robertson

4 May 2026 35	Heart of Midlothian	2–1	Rangers	Edinburgh
15:00	Kingsley 54'; Shankland 71'		Sterling 23'	Stadium: Tynecastle Park; Attendance: 18,831; Referee: Beaton

9 May 2026 36	Motherwell	1–1	Heart of Midlothian	Motherwell
20:00	Kingsley 25' (o.g.)	BBC Report	Shankland 43'	Stadium: Fir Park; Attendance: 12,306; Referee: McLean

13 May 2026 37	Heart of Midlothian	3–0	Falkirk	Edinburgh
20:00	Kent 29'; Devlin 34'; Spittal 86'			Stadium: Tynecastle Park; Attendance: 18,861; Referee: Walsh

16 May 2026 38	Celtic	3–1	Heart of Midlothian	Glasgow
12:30	Engels 45+4' (pen.); Maeda 87'; Osmand 90+8'	Report	Shankland 43'	Stadium: Celtic Park; Attendance: 59,079; Referee: Robertson
Note: Match ended without a clear confirmation of the final whistle being blown as Celtic fans invaded the pitch after Celtic’s third goal in the 98th minute. It was later confirmed by the SPFL that the match had been officially ended. During the pitch invasion, Hearts players and staff were alleged to have been physically and verbally assaulted. Resulting in them being escorted out of Celtic Park, and not able to fulfil media commitments on personnel safety grounds.

=== Scottish League Cup ===
==== Group stage ====
12 July 2025 Group E	Heart of Midlothian	4–1	Dunfermline Athletic	Edinburgh
17:15	Wilson 3'; Shankland 76', 79'; Kingsley 90+1'		Cooper 38'	Stadium: Tynecastle Park; Attendance: 12,940; Referee: Wilson

15 July 2025 Group E	Hamilton Academical	0–4	Heart of Midlothian	Cumbernauld
19:45			Findlay 6'; Kabangu 45+1'; Wilson 69'; Braga 83'	Stadium: Broadwood Stadium; Attendance: 1,827; Referee: Hardie

19 July 2025 Group E	Stirling Albion	0–4	Heart of Midlothian	Stirling
17:15			Halkett 13', 80'; Braga 23'; Kyziridis 38'	Stadium: Forthbank Stadium; Attendance: 3,309; Referee: McFarlane

23 July 2025 Group E	Heart of Midlothian	4–0	Dumbarton	Edinburgh
19:45	Shankland 17'; Steinwender 45+3'; Kyziridis 52'; Braga 72'			Stadium: Tynecastle Park; Attendance: 8,722; Referee: Snedden

==== Knockout phase ====
16 August 2025 Second round	St Mirren	1–1 (a.e.t.) (5–4 p)	Heart of Midlothian	Paisley
15:00	Gogić 34'		McEntee 78'	Stadium: St Mirren Park; Attendance: 4,738; Referee: McLean
	Penalties
	King (penalty scored); Fraser (penalty scored); Idowu (penalty scored); Mooney (penalty scored); Dijksteel (penalty scored)		(penalty scored) Shankland; (penalty scored) Kingsley; (penalty missed) Braga; (penalty scored) Forrest; (penalty scored) Baningime

=== Scottish Cup ===
17 January 2026 Fourth round	Heart of Midlothian	1–1 (a.e.t.) (4–5 p)	Falkirk	Edinburgh
20:00	Shankland 86' (pen.)		Parkinson 59'	Stadium: Tynecastle Park; Attendance: 17,109; Referee: Nick Walsh
	Penalties
	Spittal (penalty scored); Kyziridis (penalty scored); Kaboré (penalty scored); Kabangu (penalty missed); Milne (penalty scored)		(penalty scored) Spencer; (penalty scored) Henderson; (penalty scored) Graham; (penalty scored) Tait; (penalty scored) Parkinson

== First team player statistics ==
=== Captains ===
Lawrence Shankland continued as club captain under new manager Derek McInnes. He was originally appointed captain in 2022 under Robbie Neilson.

No	Pos	Country	Name	No of games	Notes
9	FW	(Scotland)	Shankland	33	Club Captain
4	DF	(Scotland)	Halkett	7	Vice Captain
2	DF	(England)	Kent	2	Vice Captain
14	MF	(Australia)	Devlin	2	Vice Captain

Last updated: 16 May 2026
Source: Competitive match reports.
Competitive matches only
Matches started as captain only
Country: FIFA nationality; No.: Squad number; P: Position; Name: Player name; No. Games: Number of games started as captain.

=== Squad information ===
Last updated 16 May 2026

During the 2025–26 campaign, Hearts have used thirty four players in competitive games. The table below shows the number of appearances and goals scored by each player.

Number	Position	Nation	Name	Totals		Premiership		Scottish Cup		League Cup	
Number	Position	Nation	Name	Apps	Goals	Apps	Goals	Apps	Goals	Apps	Goals
1	GK	(Scotland) SCO	Craig Gordon	3	0	2+1	0	0+0	0	0+0	0
2	DF	(England) ENG	Frankie Kent	25	1	9+11	1	1+0	0	4+0	0
3	DF	(Scotland) SCO	Stephen Kingsley	24	3	15+6	2	0+0	0	1+2	1
4	DF	(Scotland) SCO	Craig Halkett	35	6	30+0	4	1+0	0	3+1	2
5	DF	(Scotland) SCO	Jamie McCart	21	0	6+14	0	1+0	0	0+0	0
6	MF	(Democratic Republic of the Congo) COD	Beni Baningime	30	0	20+6	0	1+0	0	2+1	0
7	FW	(Belgium) BEL	Elton Kabangu	19	1	0+13	0	0+1	0	2+3	1
8	MF	(Australia) AUS	Calem Nieuwenhof	4	0	0+0	0	0+0	0	2+2	0
9	FW	(Scotland) SCO	Lawrence Shankland	34	20	28+1	16	1+0	1	4+0	3
10	FW	(Portugal) POR	Cláudio Braga	44	17	34+4	14	1+0	0	2+3	3
11	FW	(Burkina Faso) BFA	Pierre Landry Kaboré	27	5	14+11	5	0+1	0	1+0	0
12	DF	(Norway) NOR	Christian Borchgrevink	8	0	2+3	0	0+0	0	2+1	0
14	MF	(Australia) AUS	Cammy Devlin	33	2	27+1	2	0+0	0	4+1	0
15	DF	(Austria) AUT	Michael Steinwender	34	1	18+13	0	0+0	0	2+1	1
16	MF	(Scotland) SCO	Blair Spittal	28	2	12+12	2	0+1	0	2+1	0
17	MF	(Scotland) SCO	Alan Forrest	17	0	3+10	0	0+0	0	3+1	0
18	DF	(Scotland) SCO	Harry Milne	35	1	29+1	1	1+0	0	3+1	0
19	DF	(Scotland) SCO	Stuart Findlay	39	6	34+0	5	0+1	0	3+1	1
22	MF	(Iceland) ISL	Tómas Bent Magnússon	29	2	14+13	2	1+0	0	1+0	0
23	DF	(Netherlands) NED	Jordi Altena	17	0	7+9	0	1+0	0	0+0	0
25	GK	(Germany) GER	Alexander Schwolow	33	0	32+0	0	1+0	0	0+0	0
28	GK	(Scotland) SCO	Zander Clark	7	0	4+0	0	0+0	0	3+0	0
29	MF	(Albania) ALB	Sabah Kerjota	19	0	0+18	0	0+0	0	0+1	0
30	GK	(Scotland) SCO	Ryan Fulton	2	0	0+0	0	0+0	0	2+0	0
31	DF	(Republic of Ireland) IRL	Oisin McEntee	32	3	25+3	2	0+0	0	3+1	1
40	MF	(Brazil) BRA	Eduardo Ageu	7	0	1+6	0	0+0	0	0+0	0
49	MF	(Scotland) SCO	Marc Leonard	13	1	13+0	1	0+0	0	0+0	0
74	MF	(Uganda) UGA	Rogers Mato	3	0	0+3	0	0+0	0	0+0	0
89	MF	(Greece) GRE	Alexandros Kyziridis	42	6	32+6	4	1+0	0	2+1	2
99	MF	(Kazakhstan) KAZ	Islam Chesnokov	11	1	6+4	1	0+1	0	0+0	0
Players transferred or loaned out during the season who made an appearance
20	MF	(England) ENG	Yan Dhanda	1	0	0+0	0	0+0	0	0+1	0
21	FW	(Scotland) SCO	James Wilson	10	2	1+5	0	0+0	0	3+1	2
27	MF	(Norway) NOR	Sander Kartum	2	0	0+0	0	0+0	0	1+1	0
32	DF	(Scotland) SCO	Adam Forrester	2	0	0+0	0	0+1	0	0+1	0

- Last updated: 16 May 2026
- Source: Match Reports
- Ordered by Squad Number.

Appearances (starts and substitute appearances) and goals include those in the Scottish Premiership, Scottish Cup and the Scottish League Cup.

=== Disciplinary record ===
During the 2025–26 season, Hearts players were issued with seventy-nine yellow cards and five red cards. The table below shows the number of cards and type shown to each player.

Last updated 16 May 2026

Number	Position	Nation	Name	Premiership		Scottish Cup		League Cup		Total	
Number	Position	Nation	Name	Yellow card	Red card	Yellow card	Red card	Yellow card	Red card	Yellow card	Red card
2	DF	(England)	Frankie Kent	3	1	0	0	0	0	3	1
3	DF	(Scotland)	Stephen Kingsley	1	0	0	0	0	0	1	0
4	DF	(Scotland)	Craig Halkett	9	1	1	0	1	0	11	1
5	DF	(Scotland)	Jamie McCart	1	0	0	0	0	0	1	0
6	MF	(Democratic Republic of the Congo)	Beni Baningime	2	1	0	0	0	0	2	1
7	FW	(Belgium)	Elton Kabangu	0	0	0	0	1	0	1	0
9	FW	(Scotland)	Lawrence Shankland	4	0	0	0	0	0	4	0
10	FW	(Portugal)	Cláudio Braga	2	0	0	0	0	0	2	0
11	FW	(Burkina Faso)	Pierre Landry Kaboré	2	0	0	0	1	0	3	0
12	DF	(Norway)	Christian Borchgrevink	1	0	0	0	0	0	1	0
14	MF	(Australia)	Cameron Devlin	6	0	0	0	0	0	6	0
15	DF	(Austria)	Michael Steinwender	4	0	0	0	0	0	4	0
16	MF	(Scotland)	Blair Spittal	3	0	0	0	0	0	3	0
17	MF	(Scotland)	Alan Forrest	1	0	0	0	0	0	1	0
18	DF	(Scotland)	Harry Milne	8	0	0	0	1	0	9	0
19	DF	(Scotland)	Stuart Findlay	5	0	0	0	0	0	5	0
22	MF	(Iceland)	Tómas Bent Magnússon	3	0	0	0	1	0	4	0
23	DF	(Netherlands)	Jordi Altena	1	0	0	0	0	0	1	0
25	GK	(Germany)	Alexander Schwolow	0	1	1	0	0	0	1	1
31	MF	(Republic of Ireland)	Oisin McEntee	5	0	0	0	0	0	5	0
40	MF	(Brazil)	Eduardo Ageu	1	0	0	0	0	0	1	0
49	MF	(Scotland)	Marc Leonard	3	1	0	0	0	0	3	1
89	MF	(Greece)	Alexandros Kyziridis	5	0	0	0	0	0	5	0
99	MF	(Kazakhstan)	Islam Chesnokov	1	0	1	0	0	0	2	0
Total				71	5	3	0	5	0	79	5

=== Goal scorers ===
Last updated 16 May 2026

Place	Position	Nation	Name	Premiership	Scottish Cup	League Cup	Total
1	FW	(Scotland)	Lawrence Shankland	16	1	3	20
2	FW	(Portugal)	Cláudio Braga	14	0	3	17
3	DF	(Scotland)	Craig Halkett	4	0	2	6
3	DF	(Scotland)	Stuart Findlay	5	0	1	6
3	MF	(Greece)	Alexandros Kyziridis	4	0	2	6
4	FW	(Burkina Faso)	Pierre Landry Kaboré	5	0	0	5
5	MF	(Iceland)	Tomas Bent Magnusson	3	0	0	3
5	DF	(Republic of Ireland)	Oisin McEntee	2	0	1	3
5	DF	(Scotland)	Stephen Kingsley	2	0	1	3
6	FW	(Scotland)	James Wilson	0	0	2	2
6	MF	(Scotland)	Blair Spittal	2	0	0	2
6	MF	(Australia)	Cameron Devlin	2	0	0	2
7	FW	(Belgium)	Elton Kabangu	0	0	1	1
7	DF	(Austria)	Michael Steinwender	0	0	1	1
7	DF	(Scotland)	Harry Milne	1	0	0	1
7	MF	(Scotland)	Marc Leonard	1	0	0	1
7	MF	(Kazakhstan)	Islam Chesnokov	1	0	0	1
7	DF	(England)	Frankie Kent	1	0	0	1
Own goals				4	0	0	4
Total				67	1	17	85

=== Clean sheets ===
R	Pos	Nat	Name	Premiership	Scottish Cup	League Cup	Total
1	GK	(Germany)	Alexander Schwolow	14	0	0	14
2	GK	(Scotland)	Ryan Fulton	0	0	2	2
=	GK	(Scotland)	Zander Clark	1	0	1	2
=	GK	(Scotland)	Craig Gordon	2	0	0	2
Total				17	0	3	20

Last updated: 16 May 2026
Source: Match reports in Results

== Team statistics ==
=== League table ===
Pos	Team	Pld	W	D	L	GF	GA	GD	Pts	Qualification or relegation (Note: Teams played each other three times (33 matches), before the league was split into two groups (the top six and the bottom six).)
1	Celtic (C)	38	26	4	8	73	41	+32	82	Qualification for the Champions League play-off round
2	Heart of Midlothian	38	24	8	6	67	34	+33	80	Qualification for the Champions League second qualifying round
3	Rangers	38	20	12	6	76	43	+33	72	Qualification for the Europa League third qualifying round (Note: Since the 2025–26 Scottish Cup winners, Celtic, qualified for the Champions League via league position, the spot reserved for the cup winners (Europa League third qualifying round) was passed to the third-placed team, and the spots for the Conference League second qualifying round were moved down one league position.)
4	Motherwell	38	16	13	9	59	36	+23	61	Qualification for the Conference League second qualifying round
5	Hibernian	38	15	12	11	58	44	+14	57	Qualification for the Conference League second qualifying round

Rules for classification: 1) Points; 2) Goal difference; 3) Goals scored; 4) Head-to-head points; 5) Head-to-head goal difference; 6) Play-off (only if deciding champion, UEFA competition qualification, second stage group allocation, or relegation).
(C) Champions

=== League Cup table ===
Pos	Team	Pld	W	PW	PL	L	GF	GA	GD	Pts	Qualification	HOM	DNF	DUM	HAM	STI
1	Heart of Midlothian	4	4	0	0	0	16	1	+15	12	Qualification for the second round	—	4–1	4–0	—	—
2	Dunfermline Athletic	4	3	0	0	1	9	5	+4	9		—	—	—	2–1	2–0
3	Dumbarton	4	2	0	0	2	2	8	−6	6		—	0–4	—	—	1–0
4	Hamilton Academical	4	1	0	0	3	3	7	−4	3		0–4	—	0–1	—	—
5	Stirling Albion	4	0	0	0	4	0	9	−9	0		0–4	—	—	0–2	—

Rules for classification: 1) goal difference, 2) goals scored, 3) away goals scored, 4) matches won, 5) away matches won, 6) drawing of lots.

=== Division summary ===
Round	1	2	3	4	5	6	7	8	9	10	11	12	13	14	15	16	17	18	19	20	21	22	23	24	25	26	27	28	29	30	31	32	33	34	35	36	37	38
Ground	H	A	H	A	A	H	H	A	H	A	H	H	A	A	H	A	A	H	A	H	A	H	H	A	A	H	A	H	H	A	H	A	H	A	H	A	H	A
Result	W	W	D	W	W	W	W	W	W	D	W	D	L	D	D	W	W	W	L	W	W	W	D	W	L	W	L	W	W	L	W	D	W	W	W	D	W	L
Position	1	1	2	1	1	1	1	1	1	1	1	1	1	1	1	1	1	1	1	1	1	1	1	1	1	1	1	1	1	1	1	1	1	1	1	1	1	2

Updated to match(es) played on 16 May 2026. Source:
A = Away; H = Home; W = Win; D = Draw; L = Loss

=== Management statistics ===
Last updated 16 May 2026

Name	From	To	P	W	D	L	Win% (Note: Win% is the percentage of matches won rounded to two decimal places.)
Derek McInnes	12 July 2025		44	28	10	6	63.64

=== Home attendances ===
Last updated on 13 May 2026

Win Draw Loss

Comp	Date	Score	Opponent	Attendance
League Cup	12 July 2025	4–1	Dunfermline Athletic	12,940
League Cup	23 July 2025	4–0	Dumbarton	8,722
Premiership	4 August 2025	2–0	Aberdeen	18,677
Premiership	23 August 2025	3–3	Motherwell	18,712
Premiership	27 September 2025	3–0	Falkirk	18,919
Premiership	4 October 2025	1–0	Hibernian	18,760
Premiership	26 October 2025	3–1	Celtic	18,774
Premiership	1 November 2025	4–0	Dundee	18,767
Premiership	9 November 2025	2–2	Dundee United	18,755
Premiership	3 December 2025	1–1	Kilmarnock	18,508
Premiership	21 December 2025	2–1	Rangers	18,829
Premiership	3 January 2026	1–0	Livingston	18,504
Premiership	14 January 2026	2–0	St Mirren	18,410
Scottish Cup	17 January 2026	1–1	Falkirk	17,109
Premiership	25 November 2025	2–2	Celtic	18,859
Premiership	10 February 2026	1–0	Hibernian	18,766
Premiership	21 February 2026	1–0	Falkirk	18,820
Premiership	28 February 2026	1–0	Aberdeen	18,788
Premiership	21 March 2026	1–0	Dundee	18,827
Premiership	11 April 2026	3–1	Motherwell	18,800
Premiership	4 May 2026	2–1	Rangers	18,831
Premiership	13 May 2026	3–0	Falkirk	18,861
			Total attendance:	394,938
			Total league attendance:	356,117
			Average league attendance:	18,743

Last updated: 13 May 2026
Source: Match reports in Results

== Club ==
=== Board ===
On 30 June, it was announced that Ann Budge would be stepping down as Club Chair in December 2025. After 11 years in the role, and having taken the club out of administration in 2014, she was appointed as an Honorary President of Heart of Midlothian.

Calum Paterson was appointed as Club Chair following the AGM in December 2025. Budge waived her right to retain a seat on the club's board.

=== Management ===
On 19 May 2025, Derek McInnes was appointed as Head Coach on a four-year contract. He replaced interim Head Coach Liam Fox, who managed the club for the final four games of the previous season. McInnes also brought Paul Sheerin and Alan Archibald to Tynecastle, who were previously his First Team coaches at Kilmarnock.

=== Awards ===
==== SPFL awards ====
Name	Award
Derek McInnes	Scottish Premiership Manager of the Month Award August 2025
Derek McInnes	Scottish Premiership Manager of the Month Award September 2025
Derek McInnes	Scottish Premiership Manager of the Month Award October 2025
Derek McInnes	Scottish Premiership Manager of the Season Award
Lawrence Shankland	Scottish Premiership Player of the Month September 2025
Cláudio Braga	Scottish Premiership Player of the Month October 2025
Cláudio Braga	Scottish Premiership Player of the Season Award

==== PFA awards ====
Name	Award
Derek McInnes	Manager of the Year
Eva Olid	SWPL Manager of the Year
Cláudio Braga	Premiership Player of the Year
Craig Halkett	Premiership Team of the Year
Harry Milne	Premiership Team of the Year
Lawrence Shankland	Premiership Team of the Year
Cláudio Braga	Premiership Team of the Year

==== SFWA awards ====
Name	Award
Derek McInnes	SFWA Manager of the Year
Cláudio Braga	SFWA Footballer of the Year

==== Club awards ====
Nation	Name	Award
(Portugal)	Cláudio Braga	Players' Player of the Year
(Australia)	Cameron Devlin	Fans' Player of the Year
(Scotland)	Georgia Timms	Hearts Women Players' Player of the Year
(Scotland)	Georgia Timms	Hearts Women Player of the Year
(Scotland)	Jess Husband	Hearts Women Goal of the Season
(Scotland)	Alfie Osborne	Hearts B Team Player of the Year
(Scotland)	Alfie Osborne	Hearts B Team Players' Player of the Year
(Scotland)	Craig Gordon	Save of the Season; vs Dundee, 11 January 2026
(Greece)	Alexandros Kyziridis	Goal of the Season; vs Falkirk, 27 September 2025
(Scotland)	Craig Halkett	Moment of the season; winning goal vs Hibernian, 4 October 2025
(Scotland)	Ann Budge	Special Recognition Award
(Scotland)	Alastair Bruce	FOH Award

=== Playing kit ===
Hearts kits are manufactured by Hummel for the 2025–26 season, replacing Umbro. Hummel agreed a five-year deal with the club. Stellar Omada continues as Hearts main sponsor, in the second of a three-year deal.

=== Deaths ===
The following players and people associated with the club died over the course of the season: former striker Jimmy Bone, former coach and scout Gary Kirk, and former forward Tommy Murray.

=== International selection ===
Over the course of the season, a number of the Hearts squad were called up for international duty. Craig Gordon and Lawrence Shankland were called up to represent Scotland; Pierre Landry Kaboré represented Burkina Faso at the Africa Cup of Nations, Cameron Devlin was called up for Australia and Islam Chesnokov to represent Kazakhstan.

In addition, James Wilson was called up to Scotland's under-21 squad.

== Transfers ==
=== Players in ===
Player	From	Fee
(Norway) Christian Borchgrevink	(Norway) Vålerenga	Undisclosed
(Greece) Alexandros Kyziridis	(Slovakia) Zemplín Michalovce	Free
(Belgium) Elton Kabangu	(Belgium) Union SG	Undisclosed (Note: Kabangu was on loan at Hearts from Union SG during the 2024–25 season.)
(Republic of Ireland) Oisin McEntee	(England) Walsall	Free
(Portugal) Cláudio Braga	(Norway) Aalesunds	Undisclosed
(Albania) Sabah Kerjota	(Italy) Sambenedettese	Undisclosed
(Iceland) Tómas Bent Magnússon	(Iceland) Valur	Undisclosed
(Burkina Faso) Pierre Landry Kaboré	(Estonia) Narva Trans	Undisclosed
(Brazil) Eduardo Ageu	(Portugal) Santa Clara	Undisclosed (Note: Club record transfer fee)
(Germany) Alexander Schwolow	(Germany) Union Berlin	Free
(Netherlands) Jordi Altena	(Netherlands) RKC Waalwijk	Undisclosed
(Kazakhstan) Islam Chesnokov	(Kazakhstan) FC Tobol	Free

=== Players out ===
Player	To	Fee
(England) Jorge Grant	(England) Salford City	Free
(Scotland) Barrie McKay	(Scotland) Livingston	Free
(Scotland) James Penrice	(Greece) AEK Athens	Undisclosed
(Scotland) Aidan Denholm	(Scotland) Livingston	Undisclosed

=== Loans in ===
Player	From	Fee
(Scotland) Stuart Findlay	(England) Oxford United	Loan
(Scotland) Marc Leonard	(England) Birmingham City	Loan
(Uganda) Rogers Mato	(North Macedonia) Vardar	Loan

=== Loans out ===
Player	To	Fee
(Scotland) Macaulay Tait	(Scotland) Livingston	Loan
(Scotland) Lewis Neilson	(Scotland) Falkirk	Loan
(Scotland) Liam McFarlane	(Scotland) Alloa Athletic	Loan
(Scotland) Kenzi Nair	(Scotland) The Spartans	Loan
(Scotland) Callum Sandilands	(Scotland) Montrose	Loan
(Scotland) Adam Forrester	(Scotland) St Johnstone	Co-operation loan
(England) Yan Dhanda	(Scotland) Dundee	Loan
(Scotland) Bobby McLuckie	(Scotland) Hamilton Academical	Loan
(Costa Rica) Kenneth Vargas	(Costa Rica) Herediano	Loan
(Scotland) Gus Stevenston	(Scotland) Montrose	Co-operation loan
(Costa Rica) Kenneth Vargas	(Costa Rica) Alajuelense (Note: Vargas was on loan at Herediano for the first half of the season, before joining Alajuelense.)	Loan
(Scotland) Harry Stone	(Scotland) Airdrieonians	Loan
(Scotland) Zander Clark	(England) Doncaster Rovers	Loan
(Norway) Sander Kartum	(New Zealand) Wellington Phoenix	Loan
(Wales) Kai Smutek	(Scotland) Hamilton Academical	Loan
(Scotland) Gregor Crookston	(Scotland) Hamilton Academical	Loan
(Scotland) Bobby McLuckie	(Scotland) East Kilbride	Loan
(Scotland) James Wilson	(England) Tottenham Hotspur	Loan

== See also ==
- List of Heart of Midlothian F.C. seasons
