= Harry Milne =

Scottish professional footballer

Personal information
- Birth name: Harry Jordon Milne
- Date of birth: 29 October 1996 (age 30)
- Place of birth: Banchory, Aberdeenshire, Scotland
- Height: 1.83 m (6 ft 0 in)
- Positions: Left back; central midfielder; right midfielder

Team information
- Current team: Heart of Midlothian
- Number: 18

Youth career
- –2008: Aberdeen
- 2008–2015: Banchory St Ternan

Senior career*
Years	Team	Apps	(Gls)
2015–2022	Cove Rangers	222	(43)
2014–2015	→ Culter (loan)	23	(2)
2022–2025	Partick Thistle	79	(10)
2025–	Heart of Midlothian	39	(1)
- * Club domestic league appearances and goals as of 11 October 2026

Harry Jordon Milne (born 29 October 1996) is a Scottish professional footballer who plays as a left-back or midfielder for Scottish Premiership side Heart of Midlothian. He has previously played for Cove Rangers, Culter and Partick Thistle.

== Early life ==
Harry Jordon Milne was born on 29 October 1996 in the town of Banchory in Aberdeenshire, Scotland.

== Career ==
=== Cove Rangers ===
Milne began his career at Aberdeen-based Cove Rangers. During eight years at the club he won three league titles: the Highland League, Scottish League Two and Scottish League One.

=== Partick Thistle ===
In April 2022, Milne signed a pre-contract agreement for a two-year deal with Partick Thistle. Milne made his Partick Thistle debut in a cup game against Kilmarnock, in which Thistle won on penalties. Milne scored his first and second goal for Partick Thistle in a 3–2 home defeat to Dundee.

In July 2023 Milne added an extra year to his deal with Thistle, signing a new one-year contract taking his deal to the end of the 2024–25 season.

=== Heart of Midlothian ===
After two and a half years with Thistle, Milne joined Scottish Premiership club Heart of Midlothian in February 2025 for an undisclosed fee on an 18 month deal.

Milne became first-choice left back for the 2025-26 season after James Penrice departed the club, but began playing as a makeshift right midfielder in a 0-2 away win against Rangers and a 3-0 home win against Falkirk in September 2025, receiving praise for both performances. He then signed a contract extension with Hearts in October 2025, adding an extra year to his deal until summer 2027.

After an impressive season with the club, Milne was named in the 2025-26 PFA Scotland Team of the Year.

== Career statistics ==
As of 16 October 2026

Appearances and goals by club, season and competition
Club	Season	League			Scottish Cup		League Cup		Other		Total	
Club	Season	Division	Apps	Goals	Apps	Goals	Apps	Goals	Apps	Goals	Apps	Goals
Cove Rangers	2019–20	Scottish League Two	25	4	1	0	4	0	2	0	32	4
Cove Rangers	2020–21	Scottish League One	11	2	1	0	2	0	2	0	14	2
Cove Rangers	2021–22	Scottish League One	29	6	3	0	4	0	3	0	38	6
Cove Rangers	Total		65	12	5	0	10	0	7	0	87	12
Partick Thistle	2022–23	Scottish Championship	28	4	3	0	5	0	1	0	37	4
Partick Thistle	2023–24	Scottish Championship	34	3	2	0	5	2	5	0	46	5
Partick Thistle	2024–25	Scottish Championship	17	3	1	0	3	1	1	0	22	4
Partick Thistle	Total		79	10	6	0	13	3	7	0	105	13
Heart of Midlothian	2024–25	Scottish Premiership	3	0	0	0	0	0	0	0	3	0
Heart of Midlothian	2025–26	Scottish Premiership	30	1	1	0	4	0	0	0	35	1
Heart of Midlothian	2026–27	Scottish Premiership	6	0	0	0	1	0	4	0	11	0
Heart of Midlothian	Total		39	1	1	0	5	0	4	0	49	1
Career total			183	23	12	0	28	3	18	0	241	26

== Honours ==
=== Club ===
Cove Rangers

- Highland Football League: 2018–19
- Scottish League Two: 2019–20
- Scottish League One: 2021–22

=== Individual ===
- PFA Scotland Team of the Year (Premiership): 2025–26
- PFA Scotland Team of the Year (League One): 2021–22
- PFA Scotland Team of the Year (Championship): 2022–23
