= Cláudio Braga (footballer) =

Portuguese footballer (born 1999)

- Braga in 2026

Personal information
- Full name: Cláudio Rafael Soares Braga
- Date of birth: 28 October 1999 (age 27)
- Place of birth: Mafamude, Portugal
- Height: 1.80 m (5 ft 11 in)
- Position: Forward

Team information
- Current team: Heart of Midlothian
- Number: 10

Youth career
- –2011: Candal
- 2011–2013: Boavista
- 2013–2015: Candal
- 2015–2016: Paços de Ferreira
- 2016–2018: Rio Ave

Senior career*
Years	Team	Apps	(Gls)
2018–2019	Rio Ave B	33	(6)
2019–2020	Valadares Gaia	18	(2)
2020	Fátima	5	(2)
2020–2021	Sporting Ideal	20	(4)
2021–2022	Vila Meã	11	(1)
2022–2023	Moss	52	(21)
2024–2025	Aalesund	37	(12)
2025–	Heart of Midlothian	50	(20)
- * Club domestic league appearances and goals as of 22 November 2026

Cláudio Rafael Soares Braga (born 28 October 1999) is a Portuguese professional footballer who plays as a forward for Scottish Premiership club Heart of Midlothian.

== Career ==
=== Early career ===
Born in Mafamude in Vila Nova de Gaia, Braga played for several local clubs at youth level, later telling A Bola that he was not considered a significant prospect at any of them.

Braga concluded his youth career at Rio Ave and made his senior debut with its reserve team in the Porto Football Association's district leagues in 2018. A year later, he signed for Valadares Gaia of what was then the third-tier Campeonato de Portugal. He transferred mid-season in January 2020 to Fátima, where his good start was halted by the COVID-19 pandemic. He then moved on to Sporting Ideal and Vila Meã, again in the same league.

=== Norway ===
Ahead of the 2022 season, Braga's agent convinced him to sign for Norwegian Second Division side Moss. He helped the club achieve promotion to the Norwegian First Division, and was their top scorer and among the highest in the league in the 2023 season.

Braga believed his performances in Norway's second tier would lead to a transfer to the top-flight Eliteserien, but he instead joined Aalesund in 2024, a team who had been relegated from it.

=== Heart of Midlothian ===
On 15 June 2025, Braga joined Scottish Premiership side Heart of Midlothian for an undisclosed fee, signing a three-year contract.

Braga became a fan favourite at Heart of Midlothian with 14 goals and three assists in 33 games by April 2026, and was named in the PFA Scotland Team of the Year for the 2025–26 season having played a key role in Hearts' title challenge. Braga also won the 2025–26 PFA Scotland Players' Player of the Year for his performances with the club, becoming the first Portuguese player to win the award.

== Style of play ==
Braga plays as a forward and is right-footed. Prior to signing for the club in July 2025, Heart of Midlothian newspaper Hearts Standard described him as a "versatile and multi-faceted forward who can play off the left or through the middle".

== Career statistics ==
As of 22 November 2026

Appearances and goals by club, season and competition
Club	Season	League			National cup (Note: Includes Norwegian Football Cup, Scottish Cup)		League cup (Note: Includes Scottish League Cup)		Europe		Total	
Club	Season	Division	Apps	Goals	Apps	Goals	Apps	Goals	Apps	Goals	Apps	Goals
Moss FK	2022	Norwegian Second Division	24	11	3	2	–		–		27	13
Moss FK	2023	Norwegian First Division	28	10	3	0	–		–		31	10
Moss FK	Total		52	21	6	2	–		–		58	23
Aalesunds FK	2024	Norwegian First Division	29	9	2	1	–		–		31	10
Aalesunds FK	2025	Norwegian First Division	8	3	2	1	–		–		10	4
Aalesunds FK	Total		37	12	4	2	–		–		41	14
Heart of Midlothian	2025–26	Scottish Premiership	38	14	1	0	5	3	–		44	17
Heart of Midlothian	2026–27	Scottish Premiership	12	6	0	0	2	2	9 (Note: Two appearances in UEFA Champions League, two appearances in UEFA Europa League)	0	23	8
Heart of Midlothian	Total		50	20	1	0	7	5	9	0	67	25
Career total			139	53	11	4	7	5	9	0	166	62

== Honours ==
Individual

- PFA Scotland Players' Player of the Year: 2025–26
- PFA Scotland Team of the Year (Premiership): 2025–26
- BBC Football Awards Scottish Premiership Player of the Year: 2025–26
- SFWA Footballer of the Year: 2025–26
- William Hill Premiership Player of the Year: 2025–26
- Heart of Midlothian Players' Player of the Year: 2025–26
