= Eduardo Ageu =

Brazilian footballer (born 2002)

Personal information
- Full name: Eduardo Ageu Almeida Santos
- Date of birth: 20 February 2002 (age 24)
- Place of birth: Belo Horizonte, Brazil
- Height: 1.81 m (5 ft 11 in)
- Position: Midfielder

Team information
- Current team: Heart of Midlothian
- Number: 8

Youth career
- –2023: Cruzeiro

Senior career*
Years	Team	Apps	(Gls)
2022	Cruzeiro	1	(0)
2022–2023	B-SAD	9	(1)
2023–2025	Santa Clara	8	(0)
2024–2025	→ Alverca (loan)	27	(7)
2025–	Heart of Midlothian	10	(0)
- * Club domestic league appearances and goals as of 22 November 2026

Eduardo Ageu Almeida Santos (born 20 February 2002), commonly known as Eduardo Ageu or simply Ageu, is a Brazilian professional footballer who plays for Scottish Premiership side Heart of Midlothian as a midfielder.

Ageu started his career as a youth for Cruzeiro, before transferring to Santa Clara and subsequently joining Alverca on loan. At the time of his transfer to Heart of Midlothian, his transfer fee broke a club record.

== Career ==
Ageu began his senior career with Santa Clara in Portugal in 2023, having previously been part of the youth system at Brazilian club Cruzeiro. In 2024, he was loaned to Portuguese second-tier club Alverca, where he impressed with 11 goal contributions across the season and helped the team achieve promotion.

On 29 August 2025, Ageu signed for Scottish Premiership side Heart of Midlothian on a four-year contract, in a move reported to be a club-record transfer. He made his debut a day later, as a substitute in a 1–2 away victory against Livingston at Almondvale.

== Style of play ==
Ageu primarily plays as a central midfielder but can also operate as an attacking midfielder or from the left. He is known for his vision, creativity, and ability to break defensive lines with incisive passing. His performances at Alverca were widely praised for their consistency and flair.

== Career statistics ==
As of 22 November 2026

Appearances and goals by club, season and competition
Club	Season	League			National cup		League cup (Note: Includes Scottish League Cup.)		Other		Total	
Club	Season	Division	Apps	Goals	Apps	Goals	Apps	Goals	Apps	Goals	Apps	Goals
Cruzeiro	2022	Série B	1	0	2	0	0	0	0	0	3	0
B-SAD	2022–23	Liga Portugal 2	9	1	0	0	0	0	2	0	11	1
Santa Clara	2023–24	Liga Portugal 2	8	0	4	0	0	0	0	0	12	0
Alverca (loan)	2024–25	Liga Portugal 2	27	7	3	0	0	0	0	0	30	7
Heart of Midlothian	2025–26	Scottish Premiership	7	0	0	0	0	0	0	0	7	0
Heart of Midlothian	2026–27	Scottish Premiership	3	0	0	0	0	0	0	0	3	0
Heart of Midlothian	Total		10	0	0	0	0	0	0	0	10	0
Career total			55	8	5	0	0	0	2	0	66	8
