= Neil Parry =

Scottish footballer

Personal information
- Date of birth: 8 November 1985 (age 41)
- Place of birth: Rutherglen, Scotland
- Height: 6 ft 5 in (1.96 m)
- Position: Goalkeeper

Team information
- Current team: Alloa Athletic (player/GK coach)
- Number: 21

Youth career
- –2003: Airdrie Boys Club

Senior career*
Years	Team	Apps	(Gls)
2003	Petershill	0	(0)
2003–2005	Stenhousemuir	0	(0)
2005	St Anthony's		
2005–2009	Petershill		
2009–2011	Arthurlie		
2011–2013	Queen's Park	66	(0)
2013–2015	Albion Rovers	67	(0)
2015–2016	Airdrieonians	35	(0)
2016–2021	Alloa Athletic	130	(0)
2021–2024	Clyde	58	(0)
2024–	Alloa Athletic	0	(0)

Managerial career
- 2024–: Alloa Athletic (GK coach)
- * Club domestic league appearances and goals as of 4 May 2024

Neil Parry (born 8 November 1985) is a Scottish footballer who plays as a goalkeeper for Scottish League One club Alloa Athletic and is also the club's goalkeeping coach.

Parry began his career at Stenhousemuir, before moving on to play for Junior clubs St Anthony's, Petershill and Arthurlie. In 2011 he returned to the Scottish Football League, where he has since played for Queen's Park, Albion Rovers, Airdrieonians, Alloa Athletic and Clyde.

== Career ==
Parry began his career at career with Airdrie Boys Club, the youth team of Airdrie United. He then played one cup match as an emergency signing for Junior club Petershill before joining Stenhousemuir.

After leaving Stenhousemuir in 2005, Parry returned to the Juniors, firstly signing for St Anthony's then three months later, Petershill. In 2009, he moved to Arthurlie.

In May 2011, Parry returned to the senior leagues signing for Third Division club Queen's Park.

After two years at Queen's Park, Parry moved to Albion Rovers in May 2013. In his second season at Cliftonhill, the club won the 2014–15 Scottish League Two title and Parry was named in the PFA Scotland Scottish League Two Team of the Year.

On 30 May 2015, Parry signed for Airdrieonians. He left after only one season as the club "moved towards" full-time status, with Parry among a number of players leaving in order to stay part-time.

On 12 May 2016, Parry signed for Alloa Athletic. He combined his football career with a full-time job as a worker in the tax office in East Kilbride.

Parry left Alloa in August 2021 and signed for Clyde.

Parry returned to Alloa Athletic in the summer of 2024 as a goalkeeping coach, and was also assigned a number and included in the squad as a player.

== Career statistics ==
As of match played 30 April 2022

Appearances and goals by club, season and competition
Club	Season	League			Scottish Cup		League Cup		Other		Total	
Club	Season	Division	Apps	Goals	Apps	Goals	Apps	Goals	Apps	Goals	Apps	Goals
Stenhousemuir	2003–04	Scottish Second Division	0	0	0	0	0	0	0	0	0	0
Stenhousemuir	2004–05	Scottish Third Division	0	0	0	0	0	0	0	0	0	0
Stenhousemuir	Total		0	0	0	0	0	0	0	0	0	0
Queen's Park	2011–12	Scottish Third Division	34	0	4	0	1	0	1 (Note: Appearances in the Scottish Challenge Cup)	0	40	0
Queen's Park	2012–13	Scottish Third Division	32	0	3	0	3	0	4 (Note: Two appearances in the Scottish Challenge Cup and two in the Second Division play-offs)	0	42	0
Queen's Park	Total		66	0	7	0	4	0	5	0	82	0
Albion Rovers	2013–14	Scottish League Two	32	0	6	0	1	0	1	0	40	0
Albion Rovers	2014–15	Scottish League Two	35	0	4	0	1	0	2	0	42	0
Albion Rovers	Total		67	0	10	0	2	0	3	0	82	0
Airdrieonians	2015–16	Scottish League One	35	0	1	0	2	0	1	0	39	0
Alloa Athletic	2016–17	Scottish League One	29	0	2	0	6	0	7 (Note: Three appearances in the Scottish Challenge Cup and four in the Championship play-offs)	0	44	0
Alloa Athletic	2017–18	Scottish League One	36	0	2	0	1	0	6 (Note: Two appearances in the Scottish Challenge Cup and four in the Championship play-offs)	0	45	0
Alloa Athletic	2018–19	Scottish Championship	36	0	2	0	4	0	4	0	46	0
Alloa Athletic	2019–20	Scottish Championship	6	0	0	0	2	0	1	0	9	0
Alloa Athletic	2020–21	Scottish Championship	23	0	1	0	5	0	0	0	29	0
Alloa Athletic	2021–22	Scottish League One	0	0	0	0	1	0	0	0	1	0
Alloa Athletic	Total		130	0	7	0	19	0	18	0	174	0
Clyde	2021–22	Scottish League One	25	0	1	0	0	0	0	0	26	0
Career total			323	0	26	0	27	0	27	0	403	0

== Honours ==
=== Club ===
Albion Rovers

- Scottish League Two: 2014–15

=== Individual ===
PFA Scotland Scottish League Two Team of the Year: 2014–15

PFA Scotland Scottish League One Team of the Year: 2016–17, 2017–18
