= Tómas Bent Magnússon =

Icelandic footballer (born 2002)

- Tómas in 2026

Personal information
- Date of birth: 14 August 2002 (age 24)
- Place of birth: Iceland
- Height: 1.87 m (6 ft 2 in)
- Position: Midfielder

Team information
- Current team: Heart of Midlothian
- Number: 22

Youth career
- –2011: Fylkir
- 2012–2018: ÍBV

Senior career*
Years	Team	Apps	(Gls)
2019–2024	ÍBV	81	(9)
2019	→ KFS (loan)	9	(2)
2022	→ KFS (loan)	3	(2)
2025	Valur	10	(2)
2025–	Heart of Midlothian	35	(3)
- * Club domestic league appearances and goals as of 25 October 2026

Tómas Bent Magnússon (born 14 August 2002) is an Icelandic professional footballer who plays as a midfielder for Scottish Premiership side Heart of Midlothian. He previously played for Icelandic sides ÍBV and Valur and was a youth player at Fylkir.

== Early life ==
Tómas was born on 14 August 2002 in Iceland. The cousin of Icelandic footballer Guðjón Ernir Hrafnkelsson, he is a native of the Vestmannaeyjar, Iceland.

== Career ==
As a youth player, Tómas joined the youth academy of Fylkir. In 2012, he joined the youth academy of ÍBV and was promoted to the club's senior team in 2019, where he made eighty-one league appearances and scored nine goals and helped them achieve promotion from the second tier to the top flight. The same year, he was sent on loan to KFS, where he made nine league appearances and scored two goals.

Following his stint there, he signed for Valur ahead of the 2025 season, where he made ten league appearances and scored two goals. Icelandic newspaper Morgunblaðið wrote in 2025 that he "played a key role for Valur" while playing for the club.

During the summer of 2025, he signed for Scottish side Heart of Midlothian. On 10 February 2026, he scored the winning goal in a 1-0 derby victory over Hearts' city rivals Hibernian.

== Career statistics ==
As of 5 November 2026

Appearances and goals by club, season and competition
Club	Season	League			National cup (Note: Includes Norwegian Football Cup, Scottish Cup)		League cup (Note: Includes Scottish League Cup)		Europe		Total	
Club	Season	Division	Apps	Goals	Apps	Goals	Apps	Goals	Apps	Goals	Apps	Goals
ÍBV	2019	Besta deild karla	2	0	1	0	0	0	0	0	2	0
ÍBV	2020	Lengjudeild	8	3	8	1	0	0	0	0	16	4
ÍBV	2021	Lengjudeild	20	1	7	0	0	0	0	0	27	1
ÍBV	2022	Besta deild karla	10	1	5	3	0	0	0	0	15	4
ÍBV	2023	Besta deild karla	23	1	4	0	0	0	0	0	27	1
ÍBV	2024	Lengjudeild	18	3	4	0	0	0	0	0	22	3
ÍBV	Total		73	9	29	4	0	0	0	0	109	13
Valur	2025	Besta deild karla	10	2	8	0	0	0	3	2	21	4
Valur	Total		10	2	8	0	0	0	3	2	21	4
Heart of Midlothian	2025–26	Scottish Premiership	27	3	1	0	1	0	0	0	29	3
Heart of Midlothian	2026–27	Scottish Premiership	8	0	0	0	3	0	5	1	16	1
Heart of Midlothian	Total		35	3	1	0	4	0	5	1	45	4
Career total			118	14	38	4	4	0	8	3	168	21
