= PFA Scotland Team of the Year =

Annual award

The Professional Footballers' Association Scotland Team of the Year (often called the PFA Scotland Team of the Year, or simply the Team of the Year) is an annual award given to a set of 44 footballers in the four national tiers of the Scottish football league system, who are seen to be deserving of being named in a "Team of the Year". The award is compiled by the members of the players' trade union, Professional Footballers' Association Scotland (PFA Scotland), with the winners then being voted for by the other players in their respective divisions. The award was instituted in the 2006–07 season. In that first season, the award was voted for by the managers in each division.

The award was expanded to include the Scottish Women's Premier League (SWPL) in 2021–22.

== Key ==
Positions (Note: For more information, see Formation (association football).)
GK	Goalkeeper
DF	Defender
MF	Midfielder
FW	Forward

Key
Symbol	Meaning
†	Appeared in a first tier Team of the Year more than once
‡	Appeared in a second tier Team of the Year more than once
*	Appeared in a third tier Team of the Year more than once
¤	Appeared in a fourth tier Team of the Year more than once
Pos.	Position

== Winners ==
=== 2006–07 ===
==== Premier League ====
Pos.	Player	Club	Appearance
GK	(Poland) Artur Boruc	Celtic	1
DF	(Scotland) Steven Whittaker	Hibernian	1
DF	(Scotland) Russell Anderson	Aberdeen	1
DF	(Scotland) Stephen McManus	Celtic	1
DF	(England) Lee Naylor	Celtic	1
MF	(Scotland) Scott Brown	Hibernian	1
MF	(Scotland) Barry Ferguson	Rangers	1
MF	(Japan) Shunsuke Nakamura	Celtic	1
FW	(Scotland) Steven Naismith	Kilmarnock	1
FW	(Scotland) Kris Boyd	Rangers	1
FW	(Australia) Scott McDonald	Motherwell	1

==== First Division ====
Pos.	Player	Club	Appearance
GK	(Scotland) Alan Main	Gretna	1
DF	(Scotland) Martin Canning	Gretna	1
DF	(Scotland) Neil McGregor	Clyde	1
DF	(Scotland) Kevin James	St Johnstone	1
DF	(North Macedonia) Goran Stanic	St Johnstone	1
MF	(Scotland) Craig Bryson	Clyde	1
MF	(Scotland) Alex Rae	Dundee	1
MF	(Scotland) Don Cowie	Ross County	1
FW	(Trinidad and Tobago) Jason Scotland	St Johnstone	1
FW	(Scotland) Colin McMenamin	Gretna	1
FW	(Scotland) Mark Roberts	Partick Thistle	1

==== Second Division ====
Pos.	Player	Club	Appearance
GK	(Scotland) Paul Mathers	Greenock Morton	1
DF	(England) Peter Weatherson	Greenock Morton	1
DF	(Scotland) Stewart Greacen	Greenock Morton	1
DF	(England) Todd Lumsden	Raith Rovers	1
DF	(Scotland) Ross Forsyth	Stirling Albion	1
MF	(Scotland) Jamie Stevenson	Greenock Morton	1
MF	(Scotland) Chris Aitken	Stirling Albion	1
MF	(Scotland) Kieran McAnespie	Alloa Athletic	1
FW	(Scotland) Liam Buchanan	Cowdenbeath	1
FW	(Scotland) Iain Russell	Brechin City	1
FW	(Scotland) Paul McGowan	Greenock Morton	1

==== Third Division ====
Pos.	Player	Club	Appearance
GK	(Scotland) Stephen Grindlay	Dumbarton	1
DF	(Scotland) Paul Paton	Queen's Park	1
DF	(Scotland) Jonathon Smart	East Fife	1
DF	(Scotland) David Craig	Dumbarton	1
DF	(Scotland) Chris McGroarty	Berwick Rangers	1
MF	(Scotland) Stuart Kettlewell	Queen's Park	1
MF	(Scotland) Scott Chaplain	Albion Rovers	1
MF	(Scotland) Paul Stewart	East Stirlingshire	1
FW	(Scotland) Garry Wood	Berwick Rangers	1
FW	(Scotland) David Weatherston	Queen's Park	1
FW	(Scotland) Martin Johnston	Elgin City	1

=== 2007–08 ===
==== Premier League ====
Barry Robson played for Dundee United from August 2007 until January 2008, when he transferred to Celtic.

Pos.	Player	Club	Appearance
GK	(Poland) Artur Boruc †	Celtic	2
DF	(Scotland) Steven Whittaker †	Rangers	2
DF	(Spain) Carlos Cuéllar	Rangers	1
DF	(Scotland) Gary Caldwell	Celtic	1
DF	(Bosnia and Herzegovina) Saša Papac	Rangers	1
MF	(Scotland) Barry Ferguson †	Rangers	2
MF	(Scotland) Barry Robson	Dundee United / Celtic	1
MF	(Republic of Ireland) Aiden McGeady	Celtic	1
MF	(Japan) Shunsuke Nakamura †	Celtic	2
FW	(Australia) Scott McDonald †	Celtic	2
FW	(Netherlands) Jan Vennegoor of Hesselink	Celtic	1

=== 2008–09 ===
==== Premier League ====
Pos.	Player	Club	Appearance
GK	(Scotland) Allan McGregor	Rangers	1
DF	(Germany) Andreas Hinkel	Celtic	1
DF	(Algeria) Madjid Bougherra	Rangers	1
DF	(Scotland) Gary Caldwell †	Celtic	2
DF	(Bosnia and Herzegovina) Saša Papac †	Rangers	2
MF	(Scotland) Scott Brown †	Celtic	2
MF	(Northern Ireland) Steven Davis	Rangers	1
MF	(Portugal) Pedro Mendes	Rangers	1
MF	(Republic of Ireland) Aiden McGeady †	Celtic	2
FW	(Scotland) Kenny Miller	Rangers	1
FW	(Australia) Scott McDonald †	Celtic	3

=== 2009–10 ===
==== Premier League ====
Eight Rangers players were selected, along with Andy Webster, who was on loan to Dundee United from Rangers that season.

Pos.	Player	Club	Appearance
GK	(Scotland) Allan McGregor †	Rangers	2
DF	(Scotland) Steven Whittaker †	Rangers	3
DF	(Scotland) David Weir	Rangers	1
DF	(Scotland) Andy Webster	Dundee United	1
DF	(Bosnia and Herzegovina) Saša Papac †	Rangers	3
MF	(Republic of Ireland) Jim O'Brien	Motherwell	1
MF	(Northern Ireland) Steven Davis †	Rangers	2
MF	(Republic of Ireland) Liam Miller	Hibernian	1
MF	(Scotland) Lee McCulloch	Rangers	1
FW	(Scotland) Kenny Miller †	Rangers	2
FW	(Scotland) Kris Boyd †	Rangers	2

=== 2010–11 ===
==== Premier League ====
Pos.	Player	Club	Appearance
GK	(Scotland) Allan McGregor †	Rangers	3
DF	(Scotland) Mark Wilson	Celtic	1
DF	(Lithuania) Marius Žaliūkas	Heart of Midlothian	1
DF	(Algeria) Madjid Bougherra †	Rangers	2
DF	(Honduras) Emilio Izaguirre	Celtic	1
MF	(Scotland) Steven Naismith †	Rangers	2
MF	(Israel) Beram Kayal	Celtic	1
MF	(Finland) Alexei Eremenko	Kilmarnock	1
FW	(Scotland) David Goodwillie	Dundee United	1
FW	(Republic of Ireland) Conor Sammon	Kilmarnock	1
FW	(England) Gary Hooper	Celtic	1

=== 2011–12 ===
==== Premier League ====
Pos.	Player	Club	Appearance
GK	(Republic of Ireland) Darren Randolph	Motherwell	1
DF	(Wales) Adam Matthews	Celtic	1
DF	(Republic of Ireland) Gavin Gunning	Dundee United	1
DF	(Scotland) Charlie Mulgrew	Celtic	1
DF	(Scotland) Paul Dixon	Dundee United	1
MF	(Scotland) James Forrest	Celtic	1
MF	(Northern Ireland) Steven Davis †	Rangers	3
MF	(Scotland) Gary Mackay-Steven	Dundee United	1
FW	(Scotland) Johnny Russell	Dundee United	1
FW	(Republic of Ireland) Jon Daly	Dundee United	1
FW	(England) Gary Hooper †	Celtic	2

==== First Division ====
Pos.	Player	Club	Appearance
GK	(Northern Ireland) Michael McGovern	Falkirk	1
DF	(Scotland) Kieran Duffie	Falkirk	1
DF	(Scotland) Scott Boyd	Ross County	1
DF	(Scotland) Grant Munro	Ross County	1
DF	(Antigua and Barbuda) Aaron Taylor-Sinclair	Partick Thistle	1
MF	(Scotland) Nicky Riley	Dundee	1
MF	(Scotland) Mark Millar	Falkirk	1
MF	(Scotland) Ryan Conroy	Dundee	1
FW	(Scotland) Michael Gardyne	Ross County	1
FW	(France) Farid El Alagui	Falkirk	1
FW	(Scotland) Colin McMenamin ‡	Ross County	2

==== Second Division ====
Pos.	Player	Club	Appearance
GK	(Scotland) Stephen Grindlay	Dumbarton	1
DF	(Scotland) Mark Baxter	Arbroath	1
DF	(Cameroon) Joe Mbu	Cowdenbeath	1
DF	(Scotland) John Armstrong	Cowdenbeath	1
DF	(Scotland) Kenny Adamson	Cowdenbeath	1
MF	(England) Josh Falkingham	Arbroath	1
MF	(Scotland) Jon Robertson	Cowdenbeath	1
MF	(Scotland) Scott Agnew	Dumbarton	1
FW	(Scotland) Ryan Donnelly	Airdrie United	1
FW	(Scotland) Steven Doris	Arbroath	1
FW	(Scotland) Ryan Wallace	East Fife	1

==== Third Division ====
Pos.	Player	Club	Appearance
GK	(Scotland) Scott Bain	Alloa Athletic	1
DF	(Scotland) Michael Doyle	Alloa Athletic	1
DF	(Scotland) Ricky Little	Queen's Park	1
DF	(Scotland) Ryan Harding	Alloa Athletic	1
DF	(Scotland) Daryll Meggatt	Queen's Park	1
MF	(Scotland) Ryan McCord	Alloa Athletic	1
MF	(Scotland) Stephen Stirling	Stranraer	1
MF	(Scotland) Daniel Moore	Elgin City	1
FW	(Scotland) Jamie Longworth	Queen's Park	1
FW	(Scotland) Stevie May	Alloa Athletic	1
FW	(Scotland) Kevin Cawley	Alloa Athletic	1

=== 2012–13 ===
==== Premier League ====
Pos.	Player	Club	Appearance
GK	(Republic of Ireland) Darren Randolph †	(Wales) Motherwell	2
DF	(Wales) Adam Matthews †	Celtic	2
DF	(England) Shaun Hutchinson	Motherwell	1
DF	(England) Kelvin Wilson	Celtic	1
DF	(Scotland) Charlie Mulgrew †	Celtic	2
MF	(Scotland) Andrew Shinnie	Inverness Caledonian Thistle	1
MF	(Kenya) Victor Wanyama	Celtic	1
MF	(England) Nicky Law	Motherwell	1
FW	(Republic of Ireland) Niall McGinn	Aberdeen	1
FW	(England) Michael Higdon	Motherwell	1
FW	(Scotland) Leigh Griffiths	Hibernian	1

==== First Division ====
Pos.	Player	Club	Appearance
GK	(Scotland) Scott Fox	Partick Thistle	1
DF	(Scotland) Stephen O'Donnell	Partick Thistle	1
DF	(Scotland) Jordan McMillan	Partick Thistle	1
DF	(England) Callum Morris	Dunfermline Athletic	1
DF	(Antigua and Barbuda) Aaron Taylor-Sinclair ‡	Partick Thistle	2
MF	(Scotland) Stefan Scougall	Livingston	1
MF	(Scotland) Michael Tidser	Greenock Morton	1
MF	(Scotland) Stuart Bannigan	Partick Thistle	1
FW	(Scotland) Brian Graham	Raith Rovers	1
FW	(Montserrat) Lyle Taylor	Falkirk	1
FW	(Scotland) Chris Erskine	Partick Thistle	1

==== Second Division ====
Pos.	Player	Club	Appearance
GK	(England) Lee Robinson	Queen of the South	1
DF	(Scotland) Chris Mitchell	Queen of the South	1
DF	(Scotland) Mark Durnan	Queen of the South	1
DF	(Scotland) Ben Gordon	Alloa Athletic	1
DF	(Scotland) Chris Higgins	Queen of the South	1
MF	(Scotland) Alan Trouten	Brechin City	1
MF	(Scotland) Ryan McCord	Alloa Athletic	1
MF	(Scotland) Daniel Carmichael	Queen of the South	1
FW	(Scotland) Andy Jackson	Brechin City	1
FW	(Scotland) Nicky Clark	Queen of the South	1
FW	(Scotland) Steven Doris *	Arbroath	2

==== Third Division ====
Pos.	Player	Club	Appearance
GK	Jamie Barclay	Clyde	1
DF	Stephen McNally	Montrose	1
DF	Ricky Little ¤	Queen's Park	2
DF	Lee McCulloch	Rangers	1
DF	Lee Wallace	Rangers	1
MF	Lee Currie	Berwick Rangers	1
MF	David Anderson	Queen's Park	1
MF	Daniel Moore ¤	Elgin City	2
FW	Andrew Little	Rangers	1
FW	Rory McAllister	Peterhead	1
FW	David Templeton	Rangers	1

=== 2013–14 ===
==== Premiership ====
Pos.	Player	Club	Appearance
GK	(England) Fraser Forster	Celtic	1
DF	(Scotland) Graeme Shinnie	Inverness Caledonian Thistle	1
DF	(Netherlands) Virgil van Dijk	Celtic	1
DF	(Scotland) Mark Reynolds	Aberdeen	1
DF	(Scotland) Andy Robertson	Dundee United	1
MF	(Scotland) Stuart Armstrong	Dundee United	1
MF	(Scotland) Peter Pawlett	Aberdeen	1
MF	(England) Kris Commons	Celtic	1
FW	(Scotland) Stevie May	St Johnstone	1
FW	(Scotland) Kris Boyd †	Kilmarnock	3
FW	(Turkey) Nadir Ciftci	Dundee United	1

==== Championship ====
Pos.	Player	Club	Appearance
GK	(Northern Ireland) Michael McGovern ‡	Falkirk	2
DF	(Scotland) Paul McGinn	Dumbarton	1
DF	(Wales) Will Vaulks	Falkirk	1
DF	(Scotland) Stephen Kingsley	Falkirk	1
DF	(Scotland) Ziggy Gordon	Hamilton Academical	1
MF	(France) Tony Andreu	Hamilton Academical	1
MF	(Scotland) Mark Millar ‡	Falkirk	2
MF	(Scotland) Ali Crawford	Hamilton Academical	1
FW	(Scotland) Rory Loy	Falkirk	1
FW	(England) Kane Hemmings	Cowdenbeath	1
FW	(Scotland) Peter MacDonald	Dundee	1

==== League One ====
Pos.	Player	Club	Appearance
GK	(Scotland) Cammy Bell	Rangers	1
DF	(Scotland) Ryan Williamson	Dunfermline Athletic	1
DF	(Republic of Ireland) Callum Morris	Dunfermline Athletic	1
DF	(Scotland) Lee McCulloch	Rangers	1
DF	(Scotland) Lee Wallace	Rangers	1
MF	(Scotland) Andy Stirling	Stranraer	1
MF	(Scotland) Andy Geggan	Dunfermline Athletic	1
MF	(England) Nicky Law	Rangers	1
FW	(Scotland) Michael Moffat	Ayr United	1
FW	(Republic of Ireland) Jon Daly	Rangers	1
FW	(Scotland) Gavin Swankie	Forfar Athletic	1

==== League Two ====
Pos.	Player	Club	Appearance
GK	(Scotland) Graeme Smith	Peterhead	1
DF	Devon Jacobs	Berwick Rangers	1
DF	Steven Noble	Peterhead	1
DF	(Scotland) Michael Dunlop	Albion Rovers	1
DF	(Scotland) Kieran MacDonald	Clyde	1
MF	(Scotland) Blair Spittal	Queen's Park	1
MF	David Anderson ¤	Queen's Park	2
MF	Lee Currie ¤	Berwick Rangers	2
FW	Kenny MacKay	Annan Athletic	1
FW	(Scotland) Rory McAllister	Peterhead	2
FW	(Scotland) Andy Rodgers	Peterhead	1

=== 2014–15 ===
==== Premiership ====
Stuart Armstrong played for Dundee United from August 2014 until February 2015, when he transferred to Celtic.

Pos.	Player	Club	Appearance
GK	(Scotland) Craig Gordon	Celtic	1
DF	(England) Shay Logan	Aberdeen	1
DF	(Belgium) Jason Denayer	Celtic	1
DF	(Netherlands) Virgil van Dijk †	Celtic	2
DF	(Scotland) Graeme Shinnie †	Inverness Caledonian Thistle	2
MF	(Scotland) Stuart Armstrong †	Dundee United / Celtic	2
MF	(Scotland) Scott Brown †	Celtic	3
MF	(Norway) Stefan Johansen	Celtic	1
FW	(Turkey) Nadir Çiftçi †	Dundee United	2
FW	(Republic of Ireland) Adam Rooney	Aberdeen	1
FW	(Scotland) Greg Stewart	Dundee	1

==== Championship ====
Pos.	Player	Club	Appearance
GK	(Scotland) Neil Alexander	Heart of Midlothian	1
DF	(Scotland) David Gray	Hibernian	1
DF	(Turkey) Alim Öztürk	Heart of Midlothian	1
DF	(Scotland) Danny Wilson	Heart of Midlothian	1
DF	(Scotland) Lewis Stevenson	Hibernian	1
MF	(Scotland) Scott Allan	Hibernian	1
MF	(Senegal) Morgaro Gomis	Heart of Midlothian	1
MF	(Scotland) Jamie Walker	Heart of Midlothian	1
FW	(Scotland) Gavin Reilly	Queen of the South	1
FW	(Scotland) Rory Loy ‡	Falkirk	2
FW	(Sweden) Osman Sow	Heart of Midlothian	1

==== League One ====
Pos.	Player	Club	Appearance
GK	(Scotland) Rab Douglas	Forfar Athletic	1
DF	(Scotland) Mark Russell	Greenock Morton	1
DF	(Scotland) Stuart Malcolm	Forfar Athletic	1
DF	(Scotland) Frank McKeown	Stranraer	1
DF	(Scotland) Paddy Boyle	Airdrieonians	1
MF	(Scotland) Alan Trouten *	Brechin City	2
MF	(Scotland) Jamie Stevenson *	Peterhead	2
MF	(Scotland) Willie Gibson	Stranraer	1
FW	(Scotland) Gavin Swankie *	Forfar Athletic	2
FW	(Scotland) Declan McManus	Greenock Morton	1
FW	(Scotland) Bobby Barr	Brechin City	1

==== League Two ====
Pos.	Player	Club	Appearance
GK	(Scotland) Neil Parry	Albion Rovers	1
DF	(Scotland) Shaun Rooney	Queen's Park	1
DF	(Scotland) Michael Dunlop ¤	Albion Rovers	2
DF	(Trinidad and Tobago) Marvin Andrews	Montrose	1
DF	(Scotland) Ross Dunlop	Albion Rovers	1
MF	(Scotland) Bobby Linn	Arbroath	1
MF	(Scotland) Darren Miller	Queen's Park	1
MF	(Scotland) Paul Woods	Queen's Park	1
FW	(Scotland) Shane Sutherland	Elgin City	1
FW	(England) Peter Weatherson	Annan Athletic	1
FW	(Scotland) Simon Murray	Arbroath	1

=== 2015–16 ===
==== Premiership ====
Pos.	Player	Club	Appearance
GK	(Scotland) Scott Bain	Dundee	1
DF	(England) Shay Logan †	Aberdeen	2
DF	(Turkey) Alim Öztürk	Heart of Midlothian	1
DF	(England) Andrew Davies	Ross County	1
DF	(Scotland) Kieran Tierney	Celtic	1
MF	(Republic of Ireland) Jonny Hayes	Aberdeen	1
MF	(Scotland) Kenny McLean	Aberdeen	1
MF	(Scotland) Graeme Shinnie †	Aberdeen	3
FW	(England) Kane Hemmings	Dundee	1
FW	(Scotland) Leigh Griffiths †	Celtic	2
FW	(Scotland) Greg Stewart †	Dundee	2

==== Championship ====
Pos.	Player	Club	Appearance
GK	(Republic of Ireland) Danny Rogers	Falkirk	1
DF	(England) James Tavernier	Rangers	1
DF	(Scotland) Darren McGregor	Hibernian	1
DF	(Scotland) Peter Grant	Falkirk	1
DF	(Scotland) Lee Wallace	Rangers	1
MF	(Scotland) Jason Holt	Rangers	1
MF	(Scotland) John McGinn	Hibernian	1
MF	(Scotland) Barrie McKay	Rangers	1
FW	(Scotland) John Baird	Falkirk	1
FW	(England) Martyn Waghorn	Rangers	1
FW	(Australia) Jason Cummings	Hibernian	1

==== League One ====
Pos.	Player	Club	Appearance
GK	(Scotland) Graeme Smith	Peterhead	1
DF	(Scotland) Nicky Devlin	Ayr United	1
DF	(Scotland) Michael Dunlop	Albion Rovers	1
DF	(England) Ben Richards-Everton	Dunfermline Athletic	1
DF	(Scotland) Paddy Boyle *	Ayr United	2
MF	Liam Watt	Airdrieonians	1
MF	(Scotland) Andy Geggan *	Dunfermline Athletic	2
MF	(England) Joe Cardle	Dunfermline Athletic	1
FW	(Scotland) Greig Spence	Cowdenbeath	1
FW	(Scotland) Rory McAllister	Peterhead	1
FW	(France) Faissal El Bakhtaoui	Dunfermline Athletic	1

==== League Two ====
Pos.	Player	Club	Appearance
GK	(Scotland) Chris Smith	Stirling Albion	1
DF	(Scotland) Ricky Little ¤	Arbroath	3
DF	(England) Jonathan Page	East Fife	1
DF	(Scotland) Gary Naysmith	East Fife	1
DF	(Scotland) Scott Linton	Clyde	1
MF	Matty Flynn	Annan Athletic	1
MF	(Scotland) Kyle Wilkie	East Fife	1
MF	(Scotland) Bobby Linn ¤	Arbroath	2
FW	(England) Peter Weatherson ¤	Annan Athletic	2
FW	(England) Nathan Austin	East Fife	1
FW	(Scotland) Craig Gunn	Elgin City	1

=== 2016–17 ===
==== Premiership ====
Pos.	Player	Club	Appearance
GK	(England) Joe Lewis	Aberdeen	1
DF	(England) Shay Logan †	Aberdeen	3
DF	(Sweden) Mikael Lustig	Celtic	1
DF	(Scotland) Liam Lindsay	Partick Thistle	1
DF	(Scotland) Kieran Tierney †	Celtic	2
MF	(Scotland) Stuart Armstrong †	Celtic	3
MF	(Scotland) Scott Brown †	Celtic	4
MF	(Scotland) Kenny McLean †	Aberdeen	2
FW	(Republic of Ireland) Jonny Hayes †	Aberdeen	2
FW	(France) Moussa Dembélé	Celtic	1
FW	(England) Scott Sinclair	Celtic	1

==== Championship ====
Pos.	Player	Club	Appearance
GK	(Scotland) Cammy Bell	Dundee United	1
DF	(Scotland) Nicky Devlin	Ayr United	1
DF	(Scotland) Darren McGregor ‡	Hibernian	2
DF	(Scotland) Thomas O'Ware	Greenock Morton	1
DF	(Scotland) Lewis Stevenson ‡	Hibernian	2
MF	(Scotland) Stevie Mallan	St Mirren	1
MF	(Scotland) John McGinn ‡	Hibernian	2
MF	(Scotland) Ross Forbes	Greenock Morton	1
FW	(France) Tony Andreu ‡	Dundee United	2
FW	(Scotland) Stephen Dobbie	Queen of the South	1
FW	(Australia) Jason Cummings ‡	Hibernian	2

==== League One ====
Pos.	Player	Club	Appearance
GK	(Scotland) Neil Parry	Alloa Athletic	1
DF	(Scotland) Ryan McGeever	Queen's Park	1
DF	(Scotland) Andy Graham	Alloa Athletic	1
DF	(England) Jonathan Page	East Fife	1
DF	(Scotland) Calum Waters	Alloa Athletic	1
MF	(Scotland) Scott Pittman	Livingston	1
MF	(Scotland) Shaun Byrne	Livingston	1
MF	(Scotland) Jordan Kirkpatrick	Alloa Athletic	1
FW	(Scotland) Andy Ryan	Airdrieonians	1
FW	(Scotland) Liam Buchanan *	Livingston	2
FW	(Scotland) Danny Mullen	Livingston	1

==== League Two ====
Pos.	Player	Club	Appearance
GK	(Scotland) Chris Smith ¤	Stirling Albion	2
DF	(Scotland) Ricky Little ¤	Arbroath	4
DF	(Scotland) Thomas O'Brien	Forfar Athletic	1
DF	(Scotland) Colin Hamilton	Arbroath	1
DF	Archie MacPhee	Elgin City	1
MF	Brian Cameron	Elgin City	1
MF	(Scotland) Thomas Reilly	Elgin City	1
MF	(Scotland) Bobby Linn ¤	Arbroath	3
FW	(Scotland) Steven Doris	Arbroath	1
FW	(Scotland) Shane Sutherland ¤	Elgin City	2
FW	(Scotland) Peter MacDonald	Clyde	1

=== 2017–18 ===
==== Premiership ====
Pos.	Player	Club	Appearance
GK	(Scotland) Jon McLaughlin	Heart of Midlothian	1
DF	(England) James Tavernier	Rangers	1
DF	(Scotland) Christophe Berra	Heart of Midlothian	1
DF	(Scotland) Scott McKenna	Aberdeen	1
DF	(Scotland) Kieran Tierney †	Celtic	3
MF	(Scotland) James Forrest †	Celtic	2
MF	(Scotland) John McGinn	Hibernian	1
MF	(Scotland) Scott Brown †	Celtic	5
MF	(Scotland) Dylan McGeouch	Hibernian	1
FW	(Northern Ireland) Jordan Jones	Kilmarnock	1
FW	(Scotland) Kris Boyd †	Kilmarnock	4

==== Championship ====
Pos.	Player	Club	Appearance
GK	(Scotland) Neil Alexander ‡	Livingston	2
DF	(Scotland) Ryan Williamson	Dunfermline Athletic	1
DF	(Scotland) Craig Halkett	Livingston	1
DF	(Scotland) Thomas O'Ware ‡	Greenock Morton	2
DF	(Scotland) Liam Smith	St Mirren	1
MF	(Scotland) Cammy Smith	St Mirren	1
MF	(Scotland) Stephen McGinn	St Mirren	1
MF	(Scotland) Iain Vigurs	Inverness Caledonian Thistle	1
MF	(Scotland) Gavin Reilly ‡	St Mirren	2
FW	(Scotland) Stephen Dobbie ‡	Queen of the South	2
FW	(Scotland) Lewis Morgan	St Mirren	1

==== League One ====
Pos.	Player	Club	Appearance
GK	(Scotland) Neil Parry *	Alloa Athletic	2
DF	(Scotland) Scott Taggart	Alloa Athletic	1
DF	(Scotland) Iain Davidson	Raith Rovers	1
DF	(Scotland) Thomas O'Brien	Arbroath	1
DF	(Scotland) Jason Thomson	Raith Rovers	1
MF	(Scotland) Declan McDaid	Ayr United	1
MF	(Scotland) Lewis Vaughan	Raith Rovers	1
MF	(Scotland) Iain Flannigan	Alloa Athletic	1
FW	(Scotland) Michael Moffat *	Ayr United	2
FW	(Scotland) Lawrence Shankland	Ayr United	1
FW	(Scotland) Alan Trouten *	Albion Rovers	3

==== League Two ====
Pos.	Player	Club	Appearance
GK	(Scotland) Greg Fleming	Peterhead	1
DF	Jason Brown	Peterhead	1
DF	(Scotland) David McCracken	Peterhead	1
DF	(Republic of Ireland) Seán Dillon	Montrose	1
DF	Andrew Steeves	Montrose	1
MF	(Canada) Harry Paton	Stenhousemuir	1
MF	(Scotland) Thomas Reilly ¤	Elgin City	2
MF	(Scotland) Willie Gibson	Peterhead	1
FW	(Scotland) Mark McGuigan	Stenhousemuir	1
FW	(Scotland) Rory McAllister ¤	Peterhead	3
FW	(Scotland) Darren Smith	Stirling Albion	1

=== 2018–19 ===
==== Premiership ====
Pos.	Player	Club	Appearance
GK	(Scotland) Allan McGregor †	Rangers	4
DF	(England) James Tavernier †	Rangers	2
DF	(Norway) Kristoffer Ajer	Celtic	1
DF	(Belgium) Dedryck Boyata	Celtic	1
DF	(Scotland) Craig Halkett	Livingston	1
MF	(Scotland) James Forrest †	Celtic	3
MF	(Scotland) Callum McGregor	Celtic	1
MF	(Scotland) Scott Brown †	Celtic	6
MF	(Scotland) Graeme Shinnie †	Aberdeen	4
FW	(Colombia) Alfredo Morelos	Rangers	1
FW	(England) Ryan Kent	Rangers	1

==== Championship ====
Pos.	Player	Club	Appearance
GK	(Scotland) Scott Fox ‡	Ross County	2
DF	(Scotland) Marcus Fraser	Ross County	1
DF	(Scotland) Andy Graham	Alloa Athletic	1
DF	(Scotland) Michael Rose	Ayr United	1
DF	(Scotland) Liam Smith ‡	Ayr United	2
MF	(Republic of Ireland) Aaron Doran	Inverness Caledonian Thistle	1
MF	(Scotland) Liam Polworth	Inverness Caledonian Thistle	1
MF	(Scotland) Jamie Lindsay	Ross County	1
FW	(Scotland) Michael Gardyne ‡	Ross County	2
FW	(Scotland) Stephen Dobbie ‡	Queen of the South	3
FW	(Scotland) Lawrence Shankland	Ayr United	1

==== League One ====
Pos.	Player	Club	Appearance
GK	(Scotland) Marc McCallum	Forfar Athletic	1
DF	(Scotland) Jason Thomson *	Arbroath	2
DF	(Scotland) Ricky Little	Arbroath	1
DF	(Scotland) Thomas O'Brien *	Arbroath	2
DF	(Scotland) Euan Murray	Raith Rovers	1
MF	(Scotland) Bobby Linn	Arbroath	1
MF	(Scotland) Dale Hilson	Forfar Athletic	1
MF	(Scotland) Gavin Swankie *	Arbroath	3
MF	(Scotland) Dom Thomas	Dumbarton	1
FW	(Scotland) Kevin Nisbet	Raith Rovers	1
FW	(Scotland) John Baird	Forfar Athletic	1

==== League Two ====
Pos.	Player	Club	Appearance
GK	(Scotland) Blair Currie	Clyde	1
DF	(Scotland) Craig Thomson	Edinburgh City	1
DF	(England) Conrad Balatoni	Edinburgh City	1
DF	(Scotland) Martin McNiff	Clyde	1
DF	(Scotland) Jamie Stevenson	Peterhead	1
MF	(Scotland) Willie Gibson ¤	Peterhead	2
MF	(Scotland) Scott Brown	Peterhead	1
MF	(Scotland) John Rankin	Clyde	1
MF	(Scotland) Chris Johnston	Annan Athletic	1
FW	(Scotland) David Goodwillie	Clyde	1
FW	(Scotland) Blair Henderson	Edinburgh City	1

=== 2019–20 ===
Due to the COVID-19 pandemic, PFA Scotland cancelled their awards for the 2019–20 season.

=== 2020–21 ===
==== Premiership ====
Pos.	Player	Club	Appearance
GK	(Scotland) Allan McGregor †	Rangers	5
DF	(England) James Tavernier †	Rangers	3
DF	(Norway) Kristoffer Ajer †	Celtic	2
DF	(England) Connor Goldson	Rangers	1
DF	(Croatia) Borna Barišić	Rangers	1
MF	(Finland) Glen Kamara	Rangers	1
MF	(Scotland) David Turnbull	Celtic	1
MF	(Northern Ireland) Steven Davis †	Rangers	4
FW	(France) Odsonne Edouard	Celtic	1
FW	(Colombia) Alfredo Morelos †	Rangers	2
FW	(England) Ryan Kent †	Rangers	2

==== Championship ====
Pos.	Player	Club	Appearance
GK	(Scotland) Craig Gordon	Heart of Midlothian	1
DF	(Northern Ireland) Michael Smith	Heart of Midlothian	1
DF	(Scotland) Euan Murray	Dunfermline Athletic	1
DF	(England) Ayo Obileye	Queen of the South	1
DF	(Scotland) Lee Ashcroft	Dundee	1
MF	(Scotland) Charlie Adam	Dundee	1
MF	(Scotland) Regan Hendry	Raith Rovers	1
MF	(Scotland) Andy Irving	Heart of Midlothian	1
FW	(Scotland) Connor Shields	Queen of the South	1
FW	(Northern Ireland) Liam Boyce	Heart of Midlothian	1
FW	(Bulgaria) Nikolay Todorov	Inverness Caledonian Thistle	1

=== 2021–22 ===
==== Premiership ====
Pos.	Player	Club	Appearance
GK	(Scotland) Craig Gordon †	Heart of Midlothian	2
DF	(England) James Tavernier †	Rangers	4
DF	(United States) Cameron Carter-Vickers	Celtic	1
DF	(Scotland) John Souttar	Heart of Midlothian	1
DF	(Croatia) Josip Juranović	Celtic	1
MF	(Australia) Tom Rogic	Celtic	1
MF	(Scotland) Callum McGregor †	Celtic	2
MF	(Grenada) Regan Charles-Cook	Ross County	1
FW	(Portugal) Jota	Celtic	1
FW	(Colombia) Alfredo Morelos †	Rangers	3
FW	(Japan) Kyōgo Furuhashi	Celtic	1

==== Championship ====
Pos.	Player	Club	Appearance
GK	(England) Zach Hemming	Kilmarnock	1
DF	(Scotland) Ricky Little	Arbroath	1
DF	(Scotland) Lewis Mayo	Partick Thistle	1
DF	(Scotland) Robbie Deas	Inverness Caledonian Thistle	1
DF	(Scotland) Kevin Holt	Partick Thistle	1
MF	(Scotland) Fraser Murray	Kilmarnock	1
MF	(Scotland) Michael McKenna	Arbroath	1
MF	(Scotland) Scott Tiffoney	Partick Thistle	1
FW	(Northern Ireland) Billy Mckay	Inverness Caledonian Thistle	1
FW	(Scotland) Brian Graham ‡	Partick Thistle	2
FW	(Northern Ireland) Kyle Lafferty	Kilmarnock	1

==== League One ====
Pos.	Player	Club	Appearance
GK	Stuart McKenzie	Cove Rangers	1
DF	(Scotland) Cammy Ballantyne	Montrose	1
DF	(Scotland) Callum Fordyce	Airdrieonians	1
DF	(Scotland) Morgyn Neill	Cove Rangers	1
DF	(Scotland) Harry Milne	Cove Rangers	1
MF	Blair Yule	Cove Rangers	1
MF	(Scotland) Fraser Fyvie	Cove Rangers	1
MF	(Scotland) Adam Frizzell	Airdrieonians	1
FW	(Scotland) Mitch Megginson	Cove Rangers	1
FW	(Scotland) Rory McAllister *	Cove Rangers	2
FW	(Scotland) Dylan Easton	Airdrieonians	1

==== League Two ====
Pos.	Player	Club	Appearance
GK	(Scotland) Darren Jamieson	Kelty Hearts	1
DF	Ross Meechan	Forfar Athletic	1
DF	Andy Munro	Forfar Athletic	1
DF	(Scotland) Thomas O'Ware	Kelty Hearts	1
DF	(Scotland) Jordon Forster	Kelty Hearts	1
MF	(Scotland) Jamie Barjonas	Kelty Hearts	1
MF	(England) Owen Moxon	Annan Athletic	1
MF	(England) Joe Cardle	Kelty Hearts	1
FW	Thomas Orr	Stenhousemuir	1
FW	(England) Nathan Austin ¤	Kelty Hearts	2
FW	Kane Hester	Elgin City	1

==== SWPL ====
Pos.	Player	Club	Appearance
GK	(Scotland) Lee Alexander	Glasgow City	1
DF	(Scotland) Jenna Clark	Glasgow City	1
DF	(Republic of Ireland) Caitlin Hayes	Celtic	1
DF	(Scotland) Chloe Craig	Celtic	1
DF	(Scotland) Nicola Docherty	Rangers	1
MF	(Scotland) Hayley Lauder	Glasgow City	1
MF	(Scotland) Sammy Kerr	Rangers	1
MF	(Scotland) Colette Cavanagh	Hibernian	1
FW	(Scotland) Lizzie Arnot	Rangers	1
FW	(Costa Rica) Priscila Chinchilla	Glasgow City	1
FW	(England) Charlie Wellings	Celtic	1

=== 2022–23 ===
==== Premiership ====
Pos.	Player	Club	Appearance
GK	(England) Joe Hart	Celtic	1
DF	(England) James Tavernier †	Rangers	5
DF	(United States) Cameron Carter-Vickers †	Celtic	2
DF	(Sweden) Carl Starfelt	Celtic	1
DF	(Scotland) Greg Taylor	Celtic	1
MF	(United States) Malik Tillman	Rangers	1
MF	(Scotland) Callum McGregor †	Celtic	3
MF	(Japan) Reo Hatate	Celtic	1
FW	(Cape Verde) Luis Lopes	Aberdeen	1
FW	(Japan) Kyōgo Furuhashi †	Celtic	2
FW	(Netherlands) Kevin van Veen	Motherwell	1

==== Championship ====
Pos.	Player	Club	Appearance
GK	(England) Calum Ferrie	Queen's Park	1
DF	(Scotland) Lee Ashcroft ‡	Dundee	2
DF	(Scotland) Thomas O'Brien	Arbroath	1
DF	(Scotland) Ryan Sweeney	Dundee	1
DF	(Scotland) Harry Milne	Partick Thistle	1
MF	Grant Savoury	Queen's Park	1
MF	(England) Malachi Boateng	Queen's Park	1
MF	(Scotland) Lyall Cameron	Dundee	1
FW	(England) Dipo Akinyemi	Ayr United	1
FW	(Scotland) Brian Graham ‡	Partick Thistle	3
FW	(Scotland) Dom Thomas	Queen's Park	1

==== League One ====
Pos.	Player	Club	Appearance
GK	(Turkey) Deniz Mehmet	Dunfermline Athletic	1
DF	(Scotland) Cammy Ballantyne *	Airdrieonians	2
DF	(Scotland) Kyle Benedictus	Dunfermline Athletic	1
DF	(Scotland) Callum Fordyce *	Airdrieonians	2
DF	(Scotland) Josh Edwards	Dunfermline Athletic	1
MF	(Scotland) Adam Frizzell *	Airdrieonians	2
MF	(Scotland) Matthew Todd	Dunfermline Athletic	1
MF	(Scotland) Aidan Nesbitt	Falkirk	1
FW	(Republic of Ireland) Ruari Paton	Queen of the South	1
FW	(Scotland) Callum Gallagher	Airdrieonians	1
FW	(Scotland) Callumn Morrison	Falkirk	1

==== League Two ====
Pos.	Player	Club	Appearance
GK	(Scotland) Blair Currie ¤	Stirling Albion	2
DF	(Scotland) Ross McGeachie	Stirling Albion	1
DF	Andy Munro ¤	Forfar Athletic	2
DF	(Scotland) Gregor Buchanan	Dumbarton	1
DF	(Scotland) Paul McLean	Stirling Albion	1
MF	(Scotland) Reece Lyon	Annan Athletic	1
MF	(Scotland) Craig Slater	Forfar Athletic	1
MF	(Scotland) Jack Leitch	Stirling Albion	1
FW	(Scotland) Dale Carrick	Stirling Albion	1
FW	Tommy Goss	Annan Athletic	1
FW	(Scotland) Charlie Reilly	Albion Rovers	1

==== SWPL ====
Pos.	Player	Club	Appearance
GK	(Scotland) Lee Gibson †	Glasgow City	2
DF	(Scotland) Rachel McLauchlan	Rangers	1
DF	(Republic of Ireland) Caitlin Hayes †	Celtic	2
DF	(Scotland) Jenna Clark †	Glasgow City	2
DF	(Scotland) Emma Brownlie	Heart of Midlothian	1
MF	Mairead Fulton	Glasgow City	1
MF	(Republic of Ireland) Ciara Grant	Heart of Midlothian	1
MF	(Scotland) Sam Kerr †	Rangers	2
FW	(Scotland) Brogan Hay	Rangers	1
FW	(Scotland) Lauren Davidson	Glasgow City	1
FW	(Australia) Jacynta Galabadaarachchi	Celtic	1

=== 2023–24 ===
==== Premiership ====
Pos.	Player	Club	Appearance
GK	(England) Jack Butland	Rangers	1
DF	(England) James Tavernier †	Rangers	6
DF	(United States) Cameron Carter-Vickers †	Celtic	3
DF	(Republic of Ireland) Liam Scales	Celtic	1
DF	(Wales) Owen Beck	Dundee	1
MF	(Denmark) Matt O'Riley	Celtic	1
MF	(England) John Lundstram	Rangers	1
MF	(Scotland) Callum McGregor †	Celtic	4
FW	(North Macedonia) Bojan Miovski	Aberdeen	1
FW	(Scotland) Lawrence Shankland	Heart of Midlothian	1
FW	(Canada) Theo Bair	Motherwell	1

==== Championship ====
Pos.	Player	Club	Appearance
GK	(England) Calum Ferrie ‡	Queen's Park	2
DF	(Scotland) Jack McMillan	Partick Thistle	1
DF	(Scotland) Kevin Holt ‡	Dundee United	2
DF	(Scotland) Scott McMann	Dundee United	1
DF	(Scotland) Josh Edwards	Dunfermline Athletic	1
MF	(Scotland) Adam Frizzell	Airdrieonians	1
MF	(Scotland) Craig Sibbald	Dundee United	1
MF	(Scotland) Sam Stanton	Raith Rovers	1
FW	(England) Louis Moult	Dundee United	1
FW	(Scotland) Brian Graham ‡	Partick Thistle	4
FW	(Republic of Ireland) Ruari Paton	Queen's Park	1

==== League One ====
Pos.	Player	Club	Appearance
GK	(Scotland) Nicky Hogarth	Falkirk	1
DF	(Scotland) Finn Yeats	Falkirk	1
DF	(Scotland) Coll Donaldson	Falkirk	1
DF	(Scotland) Tom Lang	Falkirk	1
DF	(Scotland) Leon McCann	Falkirk	1
MF	(Scotland) Brad Spencer	Falkirk	1
MF	(Scotland) Liam Henderson	Falkirk	1
MF	(Scotland) Aidan Nesbitt *	Falkirk	2
FW	(Scotland) Callumn Morrison *	Falkirk	2
FW	(Jamaica) Rumarn Burrell	Cove Rangers	1
FW	(Scotland) Calvin Miller	Falkirk	1

==== League Two ====
Pos.	Player	Club	Appearance
GK	(Scotland) Darren Jamieson ¤	Stenhousemuir	2
DF	(Scotland) Carlo Pignatiello	Dumbarton	1
DF	(Scotland) Nicky Jamieson	Stenhousemuir	1
DF	(Scotland) Gregor Buchanan ¤	Stenhousemuir	2
DF	(Scotland) Neil Martyniuk	Bonnyrigg Rose	1
MF	(England) James Craigen	The Spartans	1
MF	(Scotland) Nat Wedderburn	Stenhousemuir	1
MF	(Scotland) Andrew McCarthy	Peterhead	1
FW	Matty Aitken	Stenhousemuir	1
FW	Blair Henderson ¤	The Spartans	2
FW	(England) Nathan Austin ¤	East Fife	3

==== SWPL ====
Pos.	Player	Club	Appearance
GK	(Scotland) Charlotte Parker-Smith	Heart of Midlothian	1
DF	(Republic of Ireland) Caitlin Hayes †	Celtic	3
DF	(Scotland) Nicola Docherty †	Rangers	2
DF	(Scotland) Leah Eddie	Hibernian	1
DF	(Scotland) Emma Lawton	Partick Thistle	1
MF	(Scotland) Kirsty Maclean	Rangers	1
MF	(Wales) Rachel Rowe	Rangers	1
MF	(England) Katie Lockwood	Heart of Midlothian	1
FW	(Scotland) Amy Gallacher	Celtic	1
FW	(United States) Jorian Baucom	Hibernian	1
FW	(England) Rio Hardy	Rangers	1

=== 2024–25 ===
==== Premiership ====
Pos.	Player	Club	Appearance
GK	(Denmark) Kasper Schmeichel	Celtic	1
DF	(Canada) Alistair Johnston	Celtic	1
DF	(United States) Cameron Carter-Vickers †	Celtic	4
DF	(Scotland) John Souttar †	Rangers	2
DF	(Scotland) James Penrice	Heart of Midlothian	1
MF	(Belgium) Nicolas Raskin	Rangers	1
MF	(Japan) Reo Hatate †	Celtic	2
MF	(Scotland) Callum McGregor †	Celtic	5
FW	(Germany) Nicolas Kuhn	Celtic	1
FW	(England) Sam Dalby	Dundee United	1
FW	(Japan) Daizen Maeda	Celtic	1

==== Championship ====
Pos.	Player	Club	Appearance
GK	(France) Jérôme Prior	Livingston	1
DF	(Scotland) Keelan Adams	Falkirk	1
DF	(Australia) Ryan McGowan	Livingston	1
DF	(Scotland) Liam Henderson	Falkirk	1
DF	(Scotland) Scott McMann ‡	Ayr United	2
MF	(Scotland) Jamie Brandon	Livingston	1
MF	(Scotland) Brad Spencer	Falkirk	1
MF	(England) Ben Dempsey	Ayr United	1
FW	(Scotland) Robbie Muirhead	Livingston	1
FW	(England) George Oakley	Ayr United	1
FW	(Scotland) Calvin Miller	Falkirk	1

==== League One ====
Pos.	Player	Club	Appearance
GK	(The Gambia) Musa Dibaga	Inverness Caledonian Thistle	1
DF	(Scotland) Scott Taggart *	Alloa Athletic	2
DF	(Scotland) Gregor Buchanan	Stenhousemuir	1
DF	(Scotland) Thomas O'Brien *	Arbroath	3
DF	(Republic of Ireland) Danny Devine	Inverness Caledonian Thistle	1
MF	(Scotland) Ross Cunningham	Kelty Hearts	1
MF	(Scotland) Fraser Taylor	Arbroath	1
MF	(Scotland) Fraser Fyvie *	Cove Rangers	2
FW	(Scotland) Scott Stewart	Arbroath	1
FW	(Scotland) Mitch Megginson *	Cove Rangers	2
FW	(Scotland) Alfie Bavidge	Inverness CT	1

==== League Two ====
Pos.	Player	Club	Appearance
GK	(Scotland) Liam McFarlane	East Fife	1
DF	Craig Ross	Stranraer	1
DF	Andy Munro ¤	East Fife	3
DF	(Scotland) Brian Easton	East Fife	1
DF	(Scotland) Cieran Dunne	Peterhead	1
MF	(Scotland) Andrew McCarthy ¤	Peterhead	2
MF	Innes Lawson	Edinburgh City	1
MF	(Scotland) Adam Brown	Stirling Albion	1
FW	(Scotland) Alan Trouten	East Fife	1
FW	(Scotland) Kieran Shanks	Peterhead	1
FW	(England) Nathan Austin ¤	East Fife	4

==== SWPL ====
Pos.	Player	Club	Appearance
GK	(Scotland) Erin Clachers	Hibernian	1
DF	(Scotland) Emma Lawton †	Celtic	2
DF	(Dominican Republic) Samantha van Diemen	Glasgow City	1
DF	(Scotland) Leah Eddie †	Rangers	2
DF	(Scotland) Erin Husband	Heart of Midlothian	1
MF	(Scotland) Kirsty Maclean †	Rangers	2
MF	(Scotland) Eilidh Shore	Heart of Midlothian	1
MF	(United States) Aleigh Gambone	Glasgow City	1
FW	(Scotland) Eilidh Adams	Hibernian	1
FW	(England) Katie Wilkinson	Rangers	1
FW	(United States) Brenna Lovera	Glasgow City	1

=== 2025–26 ===
==== Premiership ====
Pos.	Player	Club	Appearance
GK	(England) Calum Ward	Motherwell	1
DF	(Scotland) Paul McGinn	Motherwell	1
DF	(Scotland) Craig Halkett †	Heart of Midlothian	2
DF	(Nigeria) Emmanuel Fernandez	Rangers	1
DF	(Scotland) Harry Milne	Heart of Midlothian	1
MF	(Sweden) Benjamin Nygren	Celtic	1
MF	(New Zealand) Elijah Just	Motherwell	1
MF	(Scotland) Elliot Watt	Motherwell	1
FW	(Zimbabwe) Tawanda Maswanhise	Motherwell	1
FW	(Scotland) Lawrence Shankland †	Heart of Midlothian	2
FW	(Portugal) Cláudio Braga	Heart of Midlothian	1

==== Championship ====
Pos.	Player	Club	Appearance
GK	(England) Toby Steward	St Johnstone	1
DF	(Scotland) Ben McPherson	Partick Thistle	1
DF	(Scotland) Jeremiah Chilokoa-Mullen	Dunfermline Athletic	1
DF	(England) Cheick Diabaté	St Johnstone	1
DF	(Scotland) Robbie Fraser	Dunfermline Athletic	1
MF	(Scotland) Ben Stanway	Partick Thistle	1
MF	(Scotland) Reece McAlear	St Johnstone	1
MF	(Scotland) Jason Holt ‡	St Johnstone	2
FW	(Scotland) Jamie Gullan	St Johnstone	1
FW	(Wales) Alex Samuel	Partick Thistle	1
FW	(Scotland) Josh McPake	St Johnstone	1

==== League One ====
Pos.	Player	Club	Appearance
GK	(Scotland) Darren Jamieson	Stenhousemuir	1
DF	(England) Charlie Dewar	Alloa Athletic	1
DF	(Republic of Ireland) Danny Devine *	Inverness Caledonian Thistle	2
DF	(Scotland) Gregor Buchanan	Stenhousemuir	1
DF	(England) Remi Savage	Inverness Caledonian Thistle	1
MF	(Scotland) Reece Lyon	Queen of the South	1
MF	(Scotland) Alfie Stewart	Inverness Caledonian Thistle	1
MF	(Northern Ireland) Callum Burnside	Alloa Athletic	1
FW	(Scotland) Kieran Shanks	Peterhead	1
FW	(Scotland) Oli Shaw	Hamilton Academical	1
FW	(Scotland) Ross Taylor	Stenhousemuir	1

==== League Two ====
Pos.	Player	Club	Appearance
GK	(Scotland) Patrick Martin	The Spartans	1
DF	(Scotland) Sean Fagan	East Kilbride	1
DF	(Scotland) Ayrton Sonkur	The Spartans	1
DF	(Scotland) Logan Dunachie	Clyde	1
DF	(Scotland) Lewis Reid	Stranraer	1
MF	(Scotland) Jack Leitch ¤	East Kilbride	2
MF	(Portugal) João Baldé	East Kilbride	1
MF	(Scotland) Willie Gibson ¤	Annan Athletic	3
FW	(Scotland) Mark Stowe	The Spartans	1
FW	(Scotland) John Robertson	East Kilbride	1
FW	(Scotland) Leighton McIntosh	Dumbarton	1

==== SWPL ====
Pos.	Player	Club	Appearance
GK	(Scotland) Lee Gibson	Glasgow City	3
DF	(Scotland) Emma Lawton	Celtic	3
DF	(Scotland) Erin Husband	Heart of Midlothian	2
DF	(Netherlands) Danique Ypema	Heart of Midlothian	1
DF	(Scotland) Amy Muir	Glasgow City	1
MF	(South Korea) Kim Shin-ji	Rangers	1
MF	(Scotland) May Cruft	Rangers	1
MF	(Scotland) Eilidh Shore	Heart of Midlothian	3
FW	(England) Georgia Timms	Heart of Midlothian	1
FW	(England) Katie Wilkinson	Rangers	2
FW	(Ukraine) Nicole Kozlova	Glasgow City	1
