= 2014–15 Rangers F.C. season =

Rangers
2014–15 season
- Chairman: David Somers (until 2 March); Paul Murray (from 6 March) (until 22 May); Dave King (from 22 May)
- Manager: Ally McCoist (until 21 December); Kenny McDowall (from 21 December) (until 12 March); Stuart McCall (from 12 March)
- Ground: Ibrox Stadium; Glasgow, Scotland (Capacity: 50,947)
- Scottish Championship: 3rd
- Scottish Cup: Fifth round
- League Cup: Semi-finals
- Challenge Cup: Semi-finals
- Top goalscorer: League: Nicky Law (10); All: Nicky Law (13)
- Highest home attendance: 49,200 vs Motherwell (28 May)
- Lowest home attendance: 11,190 vs Clyde (18 August)
Home colours	Away colours

The 2014–15 season was the 135th season of competitive football by Rangers.

This was the first of their two seasons in the second tier, after winning promotion the previous season.

== Overview ==
Rangers played a total of 54 competitive matches during the 2014–15 season.

Rangers boardroom politics were a fractious force causing a constant flux with change after change of various directorial positions, rival factions attempting to take control of the company and the emergence of Mike Ashley as the major stakeholder and power broker in late 2014. That summer saw continued discontent with various fans groups, alongside Dave King, attempting to influence the board by withdrawing season ticket money. This resulted in a drop of around 15,000 season tickets from the previous season, leaving the club requiring a financial injection which the board hoped would come from a share issue and announced this in June. However, the initial intention of raising up to £10m through an investment plan by the end of August failed when city investors did not purchase enough shares, therefore, the club relaunched a £4m issue open to all existing shareholders only.

Rangers fan discontent was demonstrated during a Championship game against Queen of the South at Ibrox, with fans holding up red cards in the 18th and 72nd minutes, and this was not improved when, on 3 September, it was revealed that Mike Ashley bought the naming rights to Ibrox Stadium for just £1 in a deal with Charles Green in 2012. Concurrently, Rangers former commercial director Imran Ahmad finally succeeded in a bid to have £620,000 of club assets frozen prior to pursuing litigation over an alleged unpaid £500,000 bonus. A few days later the club were granted leave to appeal this decision yet, on 12 September, the club agreed a settlement with Ahmad much to the dismay of fans. As some Rangers supporters groups considered boycotting home matches in protest at the board, it was revealed that Ashley would not be participating in the share offer. Ashley's motivates for not investing became clear in the following month, namely withholding much needed money from the club in order to undermine the board. At the end of the share issue, on 12 September, it was announced that it had raised just over £3m which still £1m short of its minimum target. As the share issue was undertaken in order to allow Rangers to continue to operate into the new year but the failure to reach the targets meant that further funding was required. A few days later, it came to light that Sandy Easdale had met with several investors that had been introduced to him by Rafat Rizvi, a convicted fraudster wanted by Interpol, which led to calls by the Union of Fans for Easdale to resign. However, in a move to demonstrate his strength, Easdale increased his personal shareholding at Rangers to 5.21% on 24 September. On the same day as the club repaid the £1.5m loan to Sandy Easdale and George Letham. The next day, BNP Paribas bought a 5% stake in Rangers making it the fifth-highest shareholder but less than twenty-fours later it was revealed that the transaction was completed on Ashley's behalf thus increasing his stake to 8.92%. Less than a week later, Ashley's holding company, MASH Holdings, called for an EGM to remove chief executive Wallace. This signaled the start of a crucial stage in the boardroom power struggle at Rangers with King appearing to be outflanked by Ashley, who had secured the support of Sandy Easdale, David Sommers as well as the largest shareholder in Rangers, Laxey Partners.

When offers of funding from Dave King, a £16m package, and Brian Kennedy were rejected by Rangers’ hierarchy, who instead opted Mike Ashley's £2m loan offer, it was clear who was victorious. Particularly as Ashley's initial offer was insufficient and he had to be provide another £1m of funding less than a month later. In exchange for the initial funding, Ashley was granted critical power at the club with the privilege to put forward the names of two nominees for appointment to the board as well as security over Edmiston House and the Albion car park. As a consequence of his power grab both Philip Nash and Graham Wallace were forced out of the club and Derek Llambias and Barry Leach were brought in, initially as consultants before being appointed Chief executive and Finance director respectively. Also David Somers was named executive chairman but on a temporary basis in order to aid the transition. Financial respite was short lived as Rangers announced its preliminary results at the end of November indicating the club required another £8m of investment to see out the season. This effectively left Rangers at the mercy of Ashley who could dictate the terms of and source of any future funding. Due to this power, the Scottish Football Association issued Ashley with a notice of complaint for breached a joint agreement that Ashley would not play a controlling role in Rangers and would maintain a stake of no more than 10%. As Ashley had previously loaned the club £2m and a further £1m as well as having two directors on the Rangers board and a significant interest in Rangers retail operations, although, he did return the naming rights to Ibrox Stadium to Rangers. On Christmas Eve, the SFA denied him permission to increase his stake-hold in Rangers further. Also in December, the Scottish Professional Football League added to Rangers financial woes by withholding £250,000 of broadcast money the club was due in a bid to recoup a fine imposed by the Nimmo Smith Commission.

The legal implications of the previous company that owned the club's liquidation featured prevalent in the news in July and November. In the summer, HM Revenue and Customs lost its appeal over the previous club's owners use of Employee Benefit Trusts but was granted leave to appeal a month later. Meanwhile, Rangers former chairman Craig Whyte was banned from being a company director for 15 years in September and a warrant was issued for his arrest a month later, he appeared in court facing charges under the Companies Act but was released on bail. Four men have appeared in court charged with fraudulent activity following a probe into the sale of Rangers in 2011. David Grier, Paul Clark and David Whitehouse (both administrators working for Duff & Phelps), and Gary Withey (a solicitor for Collyer Bristow) made no plea or declaration at Glasgow Sheriff Court and were granted bail. Meanwhile, the liquidators of Rangers former owners secured a £24m payment from Collyer Bristow, the lawyers who acted for Whyte when he bought the club.

On the football front, Rangers league campaign began with a defeat to newly demoted Hearts with the Edinburgh club scoring an extra minute winner. Despite embarking on a nine-game unbeaten run in all competitions, a loss at home to Hibernian left the side trailing Hearts by six-points at the top of the league by the end of September. Better news for Rangers was the reaching of the League Cup semi-final after a 1–0 win over St Johnstone, being drawn against Celtic which set up the first Old Firm derby in two years. Nevertheless, the club's title charge was effectively ended in November as the side lost a six-pointer match away to league leaders Hearts leaving them nine points behind. They did bounce back the following week in the Scottish Cup registering a 3–0 win over Scottish Premiership side Kilmarnock, however, in the club's third cup competition the team surrendered a 2–0 lead to lose 3–2 to fellow Championship team Alloa Athletic in the Challenge Cup. Even with the poor league form and exit in the Challenge Cup, there was no indication of significant pressure on manager Ally McCoist. The effect of the club's financial issues as underlined by the interim results that November, proved the catalyst for McCoist's departure as he became unhappy with the number of staff losing their jobs at Rangers. The situation became too much for McCoist and he tendered his resignation on 12 December which was later confirmed to the London Stock Exchange by the club three days later, with McCoist beginning a 12-month notice period. However, he was to serve less than a week of his notice period before being placed on gardening leave by the board, with his assistant manager Kenny McDowall being appointed interim manager until the end of the season.

The turn of the year saw Ashley's control over Rangers weakened as deals were made with a consortium led by Dave King, to purchase the shareholding of Laxey Partners which had stood at 16%. King took control of a 14.57% stake and two weeks later called for EGM on 16 January. The original date was set by the board was 4 March in a hotel in London, however, this was then moved to Ibrox Stadium after two successive hotels refused to host the event and the date was confirmed for 6 March. During the run up to the EGM, the incumbent Rangers board agreed £10m funding deal with Sports Direct. The agreement saw Sports Direct hold a floating charge over Rangers Training Centre, Edmiston House, the Albion Car Park and the club's registered trademarks. Sports Direct was also transferred 26% of Rangers' share in Rangers Retail Limited (Rangers previously held 51% with Sports Direct holding 49%). The club were bound to forego all shirt sponsorship revenue for the 2016-17 season and subsequent seasons until the loan is repaid. On transfer deadline day, Rangers also loaned five players from Newcastle United, a Premier League club that Ashley owned.

The month of February a large volume of share purchase and Rangers supporters groups are heavily involved. With the writing apparently on the wall, Rangers director James Easdale resigned just over a week before the EGM and chairman Somers departed with fours days to go. The SFA's investigation into Ashley concluded at the beginning of March with Ashley being deemed to have broken rules on dual ownership due to his influence on the affairs of Rangers, he was fined £7,500, and Rangers were subsequently fined £5,500 over a month later for their lack of governance. Just two days before the EGM, the club's Nominated adviser, WH Ireland, resigned resulting shares in the Plc being suspended. The outcome of the EGM was a decisive victory for King's consortium with Derek Llambias and finance director Barry Leach being voted off the board and King, Paul Murray and John Giligan moving in. Both King and Murray subsequently applied to be passed as a fit and proper person by the SFA with the later being cleared at the beginning of May. Further board appointments were made with John Bennett and Chris Graham added to the Plc board as non-executive directors and James Blair was appointed company secretary, however, Graham resigned his directorship only three days later. On the same day as the appointments Rangers suspended Llambias, Leach and Sandy Easdale from its football club board pending an internal investigation.

After poor results in both league and Scottish Cup, Stuart McCall replaced Kenny McDowall as interim manager. At the end of March it was revealed that Rangers five loan signings from Newcastle United were signed without medicals. On same day as interim accounts were published, 31 March, it emerged that Rangers would have owed Newcastle United £500,000 if they were promoted due to the agreement struck when loaning the players. It was announced on 2 April that Rangers would be de-listed from the AIM stock exchange after failing to find a Nominated adviser within the required period. The SPFL courted controversy with the final day fixtures by moving the Rangers v Hearts match from Saturday to Sunday, with the rest of the matches proceeding on the Saturday. This could have given Rangers a possible advantage in the chase for second place; however, the SPFL performed a U-turn with all matches being scheduled for early Saturday afternoon As it was, the team failed to be automatically promoted to the Premiership, drawing the final two league matches and finishing a disappointing third in the league. This meant the club faced at least six play-off matches in order to gain promotion. The ticket pricing of these matches attracted controversy. Following a precedent set by Hibernian the previous season, Rangers stated they would allow season ticket holders entry to home matches for free, however, this was rejected by the SPFL. Not to be deterred, Rangers then announced a blanket £5 ticket price offer for all seats. The side successfully negotiated two play-off rounds before crashing to a 6-1 aggregate defeat to Premiership team. The second leg of the play-off final ended in controversy as Rangers Bilel Mohsni and Motherwell's Lee Erwin brawled on the pitch after the match as Motherwell fans invade the pitch to goad the Rangers fans.

Meanwhile, the police probed the role of Mike Ashley and Sports Direct in the Rangers takeover and searched the companies headquarters. This was rumored to be the reason that Ashley demanded the repayment of his £5m loan to the club. Rangers set the date of the general meeting for June 2015 and added its own resolutions and proposals. On 19 May King was passed fit and proper by the SFA and became Chairman of the club on 22 May. On the same day King also loaned the club an additional £1.5m and a day later, Rangers legend John Greig was named honorary president of the club on 23 May.

== Players ==
=== Squad information ===
N	Pos.	Nat.	Name	Age	Since	App	Goals	Ends	Transfer fee	Notes
1	GK	(Scotland)	Cammy Bell	28	2013	57	0	2017	Free	
2	DF	(Scotland)	Steven Smith	29	2013	111	5	2015	Free	
3	DF	(Tunisia)	Bilel Mohsni	27	2013	61	13	2015	Free	
4	MF	(Canada)	Fraser Aird	20	2011	81	12	2018	Youth system	
5	DF	(Scotland)	Lee Wallace (vc)	27	2011	162	13	2017	£1.5m	
6	DF	(Scotland)	Lee McCulloch (captain)	37	2007	303	70	2015	£2.25m	
7	MF	(England)	Nicky Law	27	2013	96	25	2016	Free	
8	MF	(Scotland)	Ian Black	30	2012	115	8	2015	Free	
9	FW	(Republic of Ireland)	Jon Daly	32	2013	72	29	2015	Free	
10	MF	(Scotland)	Lewis Macleod	20	2010	76	16	2017	Youth system	left on 3 January
10	MF	(Slovenia)	Haris Vučkić	22	2015 (Winter)	22	9	2015	Loan	
11	MF	(Scotland)	David Templeton	26	2012	83	25	2016	£0.7m	
14	FW	(Scotland)	Nicky Clark	23	2013	75	18	2016	Free	
15	FW	(Scotland)	Kris Boyd	31	2014	235	138	2015	Free	
16	CB	(France)	Sébastien Faure	24	2012	63	1	2015	Free	
17	MF	(Honduras)	Arnold Peralta	25	2013	31	1	2017	Free	left on 21 January
18	FW	(Scotland)	Kenny Miller	35	2014	187	76	2016	Free	
19	FW	(Scotland)	Barrie McKay	20	2011	46	5	2017	Youth system	out on season loan
20	MF	(Scotland)	Kyle Hutton	24	2008	72	2	2015	Youth system	
21	MF	(Scotland)	Robbie Crawford	22	2010	57	7	2017	Youth system	
22	FW	(Northern Ireland)	Dean Shiels	30	2012	81	28	2016	Free	
23	DF	(Scotland)	Richard Foster	29	2013	83	0	2015	Free	
24	DF	(Scotland)	Darren McGregor	29	2014	53	5	2016	Free	
25	GK	(England)	Lee Robinson	28	2014	10	0	2015	Free	
26	DF	(Lithuania)	Marius Žaliūkas	31	2014	28	2	2016	Free	
28	DF	(England)	Remie Streete	20	2015 (Winter)	1	0	2015	Loan	
29	MF	(Northern Ireland)	Shane Ferguson	23	2015 (Winter)	2	0	2015	Loan	
30	FW	(Scotland)	Calum Gallagher	20	2010	7	1	2016	Youth system	
31	GK	(England)	Steve Simonsen	36	2013	31	0	2015	Free	
32	GK	(Scotland)	Liam Kelly	20	2012	0	0	2017	Youth system	
34	MF	(Scotland)	Andy Murdoch	20	2012	23	1	2017	Youth system	
37	DF	(Canada)	Luca Gasparotto	19	2011	4	0	2016	Youth system	out on season loan
38	DF	(Scotland)	Craig Halkett	20	2011	0	0	2015	Youth system	
48	MF	(Scotland)	Tom Walsh	18	2012	11	0	2017	Youth system	
49	DF	(Scotland)	Ryan Sinnamon	18	2013	0	0	2015	Youth system	
52	FW	(Scotland)	Ryan Hardie	18	2013	6	2	2016	Youth system	
61	GK	(Scotland)	Robby McCrorie	16	2014	0	0	2016	Youth system	

- Last updated: 31 May 2015
- Source: Players transfer and Wikipedia players' articles
- Ordered by position on pitch.

=== Transfers ===
==== In ====
No.	Pos.	Nat.	Name	Age	Moving from	Type	Transfer window	Ends	Transfer fee	Source
18	FW	(Scotland)	Kenny Miller	34	Vancouver Whitecaps FC (Canada)	Transfer	Summer	2015	Free	
24	DF	(Scotland)	Darren McGregor	28	St Mirren	Transfer	Summer	2015	Free	
15	FW	(Scotland)	Kris Boyd	30	Kilmarnock	Transfer	Summer	2015	Free	
26	DF	(Lithuania)	Marius Žaliūkas	30	Leeds United (England)	Transfer	Summer	2016	Free	
25	GK	(England)	Lee Robinson	28	Raith Rovers	Transfer	Summer	2015	Free	
28	DF	(England)	Remie Streete	20	Newcastle United (England)	Loan	Winter	2015	n/a	
17	MF	(England)	Gaël Bigirimana	21	Newcastle United (England)	Loan	Winter	2015	n/a	
10	MF	(Slovenia)	Haris Vučkić	22	Newcastle United (England)	Loan	Winter	2015	n/a	
27	DF	(Switzerland)	Kevin Mbabu	19	Newcastle United (England)	Loan	Winter	2015	n/a	
29	FW	(Northern Ireland)	Shane Ferguson	23	Newcastle United (England)	Loan	Winter	2015	n/a	

Total expenditure: £0m

==== Out ====
No.	Pos.	Nat.	Name	Age	Moving to	Type	Transfer window	Transfer fee	Source
n/a	DF	(Northern Ireland)	Chris Hegarty	21	Linfield (Northern Ireland)	Contract terminated	Summer	Free	
n/a	FW	(Northern Ireland)	Andrew Little	25	Preston North End (England)	End of contract	Summer	n/a	
n/a	MF	(Scotland)	Charlie Telfer	18	Dundee United	End of contract	Summer	£0.204m	
n/a	DF	(Brazil)	Emílson Cribari	34	Retired	End of contract	Summer	n/a	
n/a	GK	(Republic of Ireland)	Alan Smith	21	Cork City (Republic of Ireland)	End of contract	Summer	n/a	
n/a	DF	(Scotland)	Ross Perry	24	Raith Rovers	Contract terminated	Summer	Free	
n/a	GK	(Scotland)	Scott Gallacher	25	Heart of Midlothian	Contract terminated	Summer	Free	
30	FW	(Scotland)	Calum Gallagher	19	Cowdenbeath	Loan	Summer	n/a	
21	MF	(Scotland)	Robbie Crawford	21	Greenock Morton	Loan	Summer	n/a	
47	FW	(Scotland)	Danny Stoney	18	Stranraer	Loan	Summer	n/a	
37	DF	(Canada)	Luca Gasparotto	18	Airdrieonians	Loan	Summer	n/a	
48	MF	(Scotland)	Tom Walsh	18	Stenhousemuir	Loan	Summer	n/a	
38	DF	(Scotland)	Craig Halkett	19	Clyde	Loan	Summer	n/a	
19	FW	(Scotland)	Barrie McKay	19	Raith Rovers	Loan	Summer	n/a	
	DF	(Scotland)	Kyle McAusland	21	Brechin City	Loan	n/a	n/a	
	DF	(Scotland)	Ryan Finnie	19	Partick Thistle	Contract terminated	Winter	Free	
10	MF	(Scotland)	Lewis Macleod	20	Brentford (England)	Transfer	Winter	£0.85m	
	DF	(Scotland)	Kyle McAusland	21	Dunfermline Athletic	Contract terminated	Winter	Free	
17	MF	(Honduras)	Arnold Peralta	25	CD Olimpia (Honduras)	Contract terminated	Winter	Free	
57	FW	(Cameroon)	Junior Ogen	17	Annan Athletic	Loan	Winter	n/a	

Last updated: 31 May 2015
Total income: £1.054m

==== New contracts ====
No.	Pos.	Nat.	Name	Age	Status	Contract length	Expiry date	Source
20	MF	(Scotland)	Kyle Hutton	22	Signed	1 year	June 2015	
31	GK	(England)	Steve Simonsen	35	Signed	1 year	June 2015	
48	MF	(Scotland)	Tom Walsh	18	Signed	2 years	May 2017	
24	DF	(Scotland)	Darren McGregor	29	Automatic	1 year	June 2016	
32	GK	(Scotland)	Liam Kelly	20	Signed	2 years & 6 months	May 2017	
34	MF	(Scotland)	Andy Murdoch	20	Signed	2 years & 6 months	May 2017	
37	DF	(Canada)	Luca Gasparotto	20	Signed	1 year	May 2016	
18	FW	(Scotland)	Kenny Miller	35	Signed	1 year	May 2016	

Last updated: 12 May 2015

=== Squad statistics ===
				Total			Scottish Championship		Scottish Cup		League Cup		Challenge Cup		Scottish Premiership play-offs	
No.	Pos.	Nat.	Name	Sts	App	Gls	App	Gls	App	Gls	App	Gls	App	Gls	App	Gls
1	GK	(Scotland)	Cammy Bell	18	18		11						1		6	
2	DF	(Scotland)	Steven Smith	15	20	1	13		1		3				3	1
3	DF	(Tunisia)	Bilel Mohsni	19	24	1	15	1	1		3		2		3	
4	MF	(Canada)	Fraser Aird	17	22	2	13	1	1		4		4	1		
5	DF	(Scotland)	Lee Wallace	45	47	4	31	3	2		5		3		6	1
6	DF	(Scotland)	Lee McCulloch	45	46	6	32	4	3		5		4	2	2	
7	MF	(England)	Nicky Law	54	54	13	36	10	3	2	5		4	1	6	
8	MF	(Scotland)	Ian Black	24	35	3	22	1	3		5	1	3	1	2	
9	FW	(Republic of Ireland)	Jon Daly	8	28	4	19	2	3		4	1	2	1		
10	MF	(Scotland)	Lewis Macleod	21	21	8	13	3	2		3	2	3	3		
10	MF	(Slovenia)	Haris Vučkić	20	22	8	15	7	1	1					6	
11	MF	(Scotland)	David Templeton	11	28	3	22	3			2		4			
14	FW	(Scotland)	Nicky Clark	28	45	9	33	8	1		3		2		6	1
15	FW	(Scotland)	Kris Boyd	27	43	10	29	3	3	2	4	2	4	3	3	
16	DF	(France)	Sébastien Faure	4	6		5						1			
17	MF	(Honduras)	Arnold Peralta	3	5		4				1					
18	FW	(Scotland)	Kenny Miller	38	41	9	27	7	3		2		3	1	6	1
20	MF	(Scotland)	Kyle Hutton	10	12		10		1		1					
21	MF	(Scotland)	Robbie Crawford	1	5		4								1	
22	FW	(Northern Ireland)	Dean Shiels	16	30	5	20	2	1		1	1	3	1	5	1
23	DF	(Scotland)	Richard Foster	28	29		15		3		2		3		6	
24	DF	(Scotland)	Darren McGregor	49	53	5	36	4	3		5		4		5	1
25	GK	(England)	Lee Robinson	8	9		7		1		1					
26	DF	(Lithuania)	Marius Žaliūkas	27	28	2	19	2			1		2		6	
28	DF	(England)	Remie Streete	1	1				1							
29	MF	(Northern Ireland)	Shane Ferguson	1	2										2	
30	FW	(Scotland)	Calum Gallagher		1		1									
31	GK	(England)	Steve Simonsen	28	28		18		2		5		3			
34	MF	(Scotland)	Andy Murdoch	20	21	1	14	1	1						6	
48	MF	(Scotland)	Tom Walsh	4	10		8								2	
52	FW	(Scotland)	Ryan Hardie	2	6	2	5	2			1					

Last updated: 31 May 2015
Source: Wikipedia article
Ordered by position
0 shown as blank

=== Top scorers ===
N	P	Nat.	Name	League	League play-offs	Scottish Cup	League Cup	Challenge Cup	Total
7	MF	(England)	Nicky Law	10		2		1	13
15	FW	(Scotland)	Kris Boyd	3		2	2	3	10
10	MF	(Slovenia)	Haris Vučkić	8		1			9
10	MF	(Scotland)	Lewis Macleod	3			2	3	8
14	FW	(Scotland)	Nicky Clark	8	1				9
18	FW	(Scotland)	Kenny Miller	7	1			1	9
6	DF	(Scotland)	Lee McCulloch	4				2	6
9	FW	(Republic of Ireland)	Jon Daly	3				1	4
22	MF	(Northern Ireland)	Dean Shiels	2	1		1	1	5
24	DF	(Scotland)	Darren McGregor	4	1				5
5	DF	(Scotland)	Lee Wallace	3	1				4
8	MF	(Scotland)	Ian Black	1			1	1	3
11	MF	(Scotland)	David Templeton	3					3
4	MF	(Canada)	Fraser Aird	2					2
26	DF	(Lithuania)	Marius Žaliūkas	2					2
52	FW	(Scotland)	Ryan Hardie	2					2
3	DF	(Tunisia)	Bilel Mohsni	1					1
34	MF	(Scotland)	Andy Murdoch	1					1
2	DF	(Scotland)	Steven Smith		1				1
			Own goal	2			1		3

Last updated: 28 May 2015
Source: Match reports
Only competitive matches

=== Disciplinary record ===
N	P	Nat.	Name	YC	Yellow card Red card	RC
1	GK	(Scotland)	Cammy Bell	2		
2	DF	(Scotland)	Steven Smith			1
3	DF	(Tunisia)	Bilel Mohsni	6		
5	DF	(Scotland)	Lee Wallace	3		
6	DF	(Scotland)	Lee McCulloch	6		1
7	MF	(England)	Nicky Law	2		
8	MF	(Scotland)	Ian Black	10		
9	FW	(Republic of Ireland)	Jon Daly	2		
10	MF	(Scotland)	Lewis Macleod	3		
10	MF	(Slovenia)	Haris Vučkić	5		
11	MF	(Scotland)	David Templeton	3		
15	FW	(Scotland)	Kris Boyd	1		
18	FW	(Scotland)	Kenny Miller	6		
20	MF	(Scotland)	Kyle Hutton	1		
22	MF	(Northern Ireland)	Dean Shiels	1		
23	DF	(Scotland)	Richard Foster	9		
24	DF	(Scotland)	Darren McGregor	10		
26	DF	(Lithuania)	Marius Žaliūkas	5		
34	MF	(Scotland)	Andy Murdoch	3		

Last updated: 31 May 2015
Source: Match reports
Only competitive matches

=== Awards ===
N	P	Nat.	Name	Award	Date	From
10	MF	(Scotland)	Lewis Macleod	Championship Young Player of the Month	October	Scottish Professional Football League

== Club ==
=== Board of directors ===
Position	Staff
Chairman	(England) David Somers (until 2 March) (Scotland) Paul Murray (from 6 March) (until 22 May) (Scotland) Dave King (from 22 May)
Chief executive	(Scotland) Graham Wallace (until 27 October) (England) Derek Llambias (from 19 December) (until 6 March)
Finance director	(England) Philip Nash (from 25 July) (until 24 October) (England) Barry Leach (from 5 January) (until 6 March)
Non-executive director	(Scotland) James Easdale (until 25 February)
Non-executive director	(Scotland) Norman Crighton (until 10 December)
Non-executive director	(England) Derek Llambias (from 3 November) (until 19 December)
Non-executive director	(Scotland) John Bennett (from 10 March)
Non-executive director	(Scotland) Chris Graham (from 10 March) (until 13 March)
Non-executive director	(Scotland) John Gilligan (from 6 March)
Non-executive director	(Scotland) Douglas Park (from 6 March)

Source: Wikipedia article

=== Coaching staff ===
Position	Staff
Manager	(Scotland) Ally McCoist (until 21 December) (Scotland) Kenny McDowall (from 21 December) (until 12 March) (Scotland) Stuart McCall (from 12 March)
Assistant manager	(Scotland) Kenny McDowall (until 21 December) (Scotland) Gordon Durie (from 23 December) (Scotland) Kenny Black (from 12 March)
First-team coach	(Scotland) Ian Durrant (until 23 December) (Scotland) Lee McCulloch (from 23 December)
Head of Sports; Science	(Scotland) Jim Henry
Goalkeepers coach	(Scotland) Jim Stewart

Source: Wikipedia article

=== Other staff ===
Position	Staff
Head of Academy	(Scotland) Jimmy Sinclair (until December) (Scotland) Craig Mulholland (from December)
Head of Football; Administration	(Scotland) Andrew Dickson
Company; Secretary	(England) Philip Nash (until 25 July) (England) Martin Wood (from 13 November) (until 10 March) (Scotland) James Blair (from 10 March)
Physiotherapists	(England) Steve Walker (Scotland) Kevin Maclellan (from 11 July)
Doctor	(Scotland) Dr Paul Jackson
Masseur	(Scotland) Davie Lavey (until 5 December)
Kit controller	(Scotland) Jimmy Bell
Analyst	(Scotland) Steve Harvey
Consultant (Operations)	(England) Derek Llambias (from 28 October) (until 3 November)
Consultant (Finance)	(England) Barry Leach (from 28 October) (until 5 January)
Consultant (Communications)	(England) Paul Tyrrell (until 28 October)
Honorary President	(Scotland) John Greig (from 23 May)

Source: Wikipedia article

== Matches ==
=== Pre-season ===
3 July 2014 Friendly	Buckie Thistle	0–3	Rangers	Buckie, Scotland
19:40		Rangers Report	Gallagher 32', 34'; Miller 82'	Stadium: Victoria Park; Referee: David Watt

6 July 2014 Friendly	Brora Rangers	1–1	Rangers	Brora, Scotland
15:00	MacKay 14'	Rangers Report	Boyd 76'	Stadium: Dudgeon Park; Attendance: 1,988

10 July 2014 Friendly	Rangers	4–2	Fulham	Auchenhowie, Scotland
12:00	Miller 11'; Macleod 20'; Law 67'; Clark 73'	Rangers Report	Dembele; Rodallega	Stadium: Rangers Training Centre; Attendance: –
Note: The match was played behind closed doors.

15 July 2014 Friendly	Ventura County Fusion	3–1	Rangers	Ventura, United States
19:15	Vale 41'; Argueta 73'; LaGrassa 84'	Rangers Report	Mohsni 80'	Stadium: Ventura College Sportsplex; Referee: Reed Christy

19 July 2014 Friendly	Sacramento Republic	1–2	Rangers	Sacramento, United States
19:30	Martinez 45+3'	Rangers Report	McGregor 47'; Black 90'	Stadium: Bonney Field; Attendance: 8,000; Referee: Alex Del Angel

21 July 2014 Friendly	Victoria Highlanders	1–2	Rangers	Victoria, Canada
18:00	Hundell 11'	Rangers Report	Gallagher 9'; Clark 28'	Stadium: Centennial Stadium; Attendance: 5,735

23 July 2014 Friendly	Ottawa Fury	0–1	Rangers	Ottawa, Canada
19:00		Rangers Report	Law 38'	Stadium: TD Place Stadium; Attendance: 8,643; Referee: Mathieu Bourdeau

29 July 2014 Friendly	Partick Thistle	0–1	Rangers	Glasgow, Scotland
15:00		Rangers Report	Macleod	Stadium: Firhill Stadium; Attendance: –

2 August 2014 Friendly	Derby County	2–0	Rangers	Derby, England
13:00	Martin 59', 74'	Rangers Report	Mohsni (red card) 76'	Stadium: Pride Park Stadium; Attendance: 17,860; Referee: Mark Heywood

=== Scottish Championship ===
10 August 2014 Championship	Rangers	1–2	Heart of Midlothian	Glasgow
13:30	Law 90+1'	BBC Report; Rangers Report; SPFL Report	Wilson 53'; Sow 90+2'	Stadium: Ibrox Stadium; Attendance: 43,683; Referee: Craig Thomson

15 August 2014 Championship	Falkirk	0–2	Rangers	Falkirk
19:45		BBC Report; Rangers Report; SPFL Report	Macleod 78'; Clark 84'	Stadium: Falkirk Stadium; Attendance: 6,927; Referee: Calum Murray

23 August 2014 Championship	Rangers	4–1	Dumbarton	Glasgow
15:00	McCulloch 15'; McGregor 30'; Clark 54'; Tuner 76' (o.g.)	BBC Report; Rangers Report; SPFL Report	Mohsni 81' (o.g.)	Stadium: Ibrox Stadium; Attendance: 31,175; Referee: Brian Colvin

30 August 2014 Championship	Rangers	4–2	Queen of the South	Glasgow
15:00	Žaliūkas 27'; Templeton 46'; Mohsni 64'; Miller 86'	BBC Report; Rangers Report; SPFL Report	Reilly 22'; Russell 36'	Stadium: Ibrox Stadium; Attendance: 31,851; Referee: Steven McLean

12 September 2014 Championship	Raith Rovers	0–4	Rangers	Kirkcaldy
19:45		BBC Report; Rangers Report; SPFL Report	Clark 16'; Black 38'; Law 39'; McCulloch 73' (pen.)	Stadium: Stark's Park; Attendance: 6,250; Referee: Brian Colvin

20 September 2014 Championship	Alloa Athletic	1–1	Rangers	Alloa
15:00	Tiffoney 35'	BBC Report; Rangers Report; SPFL Report	Templeton 84'	Stadium: Recreation Park; Attendance: 2,793; Referee: John McKendrick

29 September 2014 Championship	Rangers	1–3	Hibernian	Glasgow
19:45	Law 55'	BBC Report; Rangers Report; SPFL Report	Cummings 25', 39'; Gray 31'	Stadium: Ibrox Stadium; Attendance: 31,619; Referee: Calum Murray

4 October 2014 Championship	Livingston	0–1	Rangers	Livingston
15:00		BBC Report; Rangers Report; SPFL Report	Macleod 8'	Stadium: Almondvale Stadium; Attendance: 5,924; Referee: Stephen Finnie

18 October 2014 Championship	Rangers	6–1	Raith Rovers	Glasgow
15:00	McCulloch 8'; Law 36'; Miller 55'; Boyd 63'; Daly 84', 90'	BBC Report; Rangers Report; SPFL Report	Scott 54'	Stadium: Ibrox Stadium; Attendance: 33,956; Referee: Don Robertson

25 October 2014 Championship	Dumbarton	0–3	Rangers	Dumbarton
15:00		BBC Report; Rangers Report; SPFL Report	Miller 26'; Wallace 61'; Boyd 72'	Stadium: Bet Butler Stadium; Attendance: 1,850; Referee: Andrew Dallas

4 November 2014 Championship	Cowdenbeath	0–3	Rangers	Cowdenbeath
19:45		BBC Report; Rangers Report; SPFL Report	Law 3'; Miller 55' (o.g.); Templeton 85'	Stadium: Central Park; Attendance: 3,919; Referee: Crawford Allan

8 November 2014 Championship	Rangers	4–0	Falkirk	Glasgow
15:00	Law 25'; Macleod 69'; Miller 75'; Clark 82'	BBC Report; Rangers Report; SPFL Report		Stadium: Ibrox Stadium; Attendance: 33,359; Referee: John McKendrick

15 November 2014 Championship	Rangers	1–1	Alloa Athletic	Glasgow
15:00	McCulloch 72'	BBC Report; Rangers Report; SPFL Report	Buchanan 78'	Stadium: Ibrox Stadium; Attendance: 29,548; Referee: Greg Aitken

22 November 2014 Championship	Heart of Midlothian	2–0	Rangers	Edinburgh
12:45	Holt 56'; Walker 88' (pen.)	BBC Report; Rangers Report; SPFL Report		Stadium: Tynecastle Stadium; Attendance: 17,004; Referee: Craig Thomson

6 December 2014 Championship	Rangers	1–0	Cowdenbeath	Glasgow
15:00	Shiels 58'	BBC Report; Rangers Report; SPFL Report		Stadium: Ibrox Stadium; Attendance: 28,137; Referee: Graham Beaton

12 December 2014 Championship	Queen of the South	2–0	Rangers	Dumfries
19:45	Holt 22'; Reilly 67'	BBC Report; Rangers Report; SPFL Report		Stadium: Palmerston Park; Attendance: 6,185; Referee: Andrew Dallas

20 December 2014 Championship	Rangers	2–0	Livingston	Glasgow
15:00	Aird 10'; Mensing 74' (o.g.)	BBC Report; Rangers Report; SPFL Report		Stadium: Ibrox Stadium; Attendance: 28,053; Referee: William Collum

27 December 2014 Championship	Hibernian	4–0	Rangers	Edinburgh
12:15	Gray 8'; Cummings 12'; Robertson 63'; Craig 70'	BBC Report; Rangers Report; SPFL Report		Stadium: Easter Road; Attendance: 15,261; Referee: Bobby Madden

3 January 2015 Championship	Rangers	3–1	Dumbarton	Glasgow
15:00	Daly 22'; Wallace 41'; Shiels 90+3'	BBC Report; Rangers Report; SPFL Report	Graham 15'	Stadium: Ibrox Stadium; Attendance: 30,031; Referee: Brian Colvin

10 January 2015 Championship	Alloa Athletic	0–1	Rangers	Alloa
15:00		BBC Report; Rangers Report; SPFL Report	Law 15'	Stadium: Recreation Park; Attendance: 3,012; Referee: Greg Aitken

13 February 2015 Championship	Rangers	0–2	Hibernian	Glasgow
19:45		BBC Report; Rangers Report; SPFL Report	Robertson 19'; Stevenson 81'	Stadium: Ibrox Stadium; Attendance: 29,769; Referee: Steven McLean

20 February 2015 Championship	Raith Rovers	1–2	Rangers	Kirkcaldy
19:45	Conroy 70'	BBC Report; Rangers Report; SPFL Report	Murdoch 35'; Boyd 54'	Stadium: Stark's Park; Attendance: 4,604; Referee: Craig Charleston

27 February 2015 Championship	Falkirk	1–1	Rangers	Falkirk
19:45	Loy 22'	BBC Report; Rangers Report; SPFL Report	McGregor 20'	Stadium: Falkirk Stadium; Attendance: 7,492; Referee: William Collum

7 March 2015 Championship	Cowdenbeath	0–0	Rangers	Cowdenbeath
15:00		BBC Report; Rangers Report; SPFL Report		Stadium: Central Park; Attendance: 3,244; Referee: Stephen Finnie

10 March 2015 Championship	Rangers	1–1	Queen of the South	Glasgow
19:45	Vučkić 77'	BBC Report; Rangers Report; SPFL Report	A. Smith 86'	Stadium: Ibrox Stadium; Attendance: 35,018; Referee: John McKendrick

14 March 2015 Championship	Rangers	1–1	Livingston	Glasgow
15:00	Vučkić 9'	BBC Report; Rangers Report; SPFL Report	Sekajja 45'	Stadium: Ibrox Stadium; Attendance: 35,066; Referee: Andrew Dallas

17 March 2015 Championship	Rangers	2–2	Alloa Athletic	Glasgow
19:45	Clark 72', 77'	BBC Report; Rangers Report; SPFL Report	Gordon 53'; Buchanan 82'	Stadium: Ibrox Stadium; Attendance: 28,902; Referee: Craig Charleston

22 March 2015 Championship	Hibernian	0–2	Rangers	Edinburgh
12:45		BBC Report; Rangers Report; SPFL Report	Wallace 44'; Miller 80'	Stadium: Easter Road; Attendance: 14,075; Referee: William Collum

28 March 2015 Championship	Rangers	4–1	Cowdenbeath	Glasgow
15:00	Clark 49'; McGregor 83'; Vučkić 88', 90'	BBC Report; Rangers Report; SPFL Report	Oyenuga 76'	Stadium: Ibrox Stadium; Attendance: 32,682; Referee: Brian Colvin

5 April 2015 Championship	Rangers	2–1	Heart of Midlothian	Glasgow
12:15	Miller 28'; Vučkić 38'	BBC Report; Rangers Report; SPFL Report	Zeefuik 83'	Stadium: Ibrox Stadium; Attendance: 40,521; Referee: Bobby Madden

9 April 2015 Championship	Queen of the South	3–0	Rangers	Dumfries
19:45	Lyle 33'; Kidd 46'; Reilly 69'	BBC Report; Rangers Report; SPFL Report		Stadium: Palmerston Park; Attendance: 5,093; Referee: Don Robertson

12 April 2015 Championship	Rangers	4–0	Raith Rovers	Glasgow
15:00	Clark 6'; Vučkić 27'; Law 72', 88'	BBC Report; Rangers Report; SPFL Report		Stadium: Ibrox Stadium; Attendance: 31,427; Referee: Stephen Finnie

15 April 2015 Championship	Livingston	1–1	Rangers	Livingston
19:45	Hippolyte 47'	BBC Report; Rangers Report; SPFL Report	Žaliūkas 49'	Stadium: Almondvale Stadium; Attendance: 4,345; Referee: Greg Aitken

18 April 2015 Championship	Dumbarton	1–3	Rangers	Dumbarton
15:00	Wilson 2'	BBC Report; Rangers Report; SPFL Report	Hardie 10', 48'; Vučkić 52'	Stadium: Bet Butler Stadium; Attendance: 1,766; Referee: Craig Thomson

25 April 2015 Championship	Rangers	2–2	Falkirk	Glasgow
15:00	Vučkić 83'; Law 90+3'	BBC Report; Rangers Report; SPFL Report	Baird 57'; Taiwo 61'	Stadium: Ibrox Stadium; Attendance: 35,566; Referee: Euan Anderson

2 May 2015 Championship	Heart of Midlothian	2–2	Rangers	Edinburgh
15:00	Zeefuik 82', 90'	BBC Report; Rangers Report; SPFL Report	McGregor 32'; Miller 40'	Stadium: Tynecastle Stadium; Attendance: 16,874; Referee: Calum Murray

=== Scottish Premiership play-offs ===
9 May 2015 Quarter-Final	Queen of the South	1–2	Rangers	Dumfries
17:30	Lyle 64'	BBC Report; Rangers Report; SPFL Report	Smith 44'; Shiels 75'	Stadium: Palmerston Park; Attendance: 5,224; Referee: Alan Muir

17 May 2015 Quarter-Final	Rangers	1–1 (3–2 agg.)	Queen of the South	Glasgow
15:30	Wallace 60'	BBC Report; Rangers Report; SPFL Report	Lyle 35'	Stadium: Ibrox Stadium; Attendance: 48,035; Referee: Kevin Clancy

20 May 2015 Semi-Final	Rangers	2–0	Hibernian	Glasgow
19:45	Clark 44'; Miller 63'	BBC Report; Rangers Report; SPFL Report		Stadium: Ibrox Stadium; Attendance: 41,236; Referee: Calum Murray

23 May 2015 Semi-Final	Hibernian	1–0 (1–2 agg.)	Rangers	Edinburgh
12:00	Cummings 90+4'	BBC Report; Rangers Report; SPFL Report		Stadium: Easter Road; Attendance: 14,742; Referee: Graham Beaton

28 May 2015 Final	Rangers	1–3	Motherwell	Glasgow
19:45	McGregor 82'	BBC Report; Rangers Report; SPFL Report	Erwin 27'; McManus 40'; Ainsworth 47'	Stadium: Ibrox Stadium; Attendance: 49,200; Referee: Bobby Madden

31 May 2015 Final	Motherwell	3–0 (6–1 agg.)	Rangers	Motherwell
15:00	Johnson 52'; Ainsworth 70'; Sutton 90+3' (pen.)	BBC Report; Rangers Report; SPFL Report		Stadium: Fir Park; Attendance: 9,220; Referee: Craig Thomson

=== Challenge Cup ===
5 August 2014 First round (South)	Rangers	2–1 (a.e.t.)	Hibernian	Glasgow
19:35 BST	Macleod 14'; Law 101'	BBC Report; Rangers Report; SPFL Report	Handling 60'; Handling (red card) 79'	Stadium: Ibrox Stadium; Attendance: 18,138; Referee: John Beaton

18 August 2014 Second round (South)	Rangers	8–1	Clyde	Glasgow
19:35 BST	Boyd 16', 33', 79'; Aird 24'; McCulloch 38', 77'; Macleod 45', 65'	BBC Report; Rangers Report; SPFL Report	Watt 90'	Stadium: Ibrox Stadium; Attendance: 11,190; Referee: Andrew Dallas

21 October 2014 Quarter-final	East Fife	0–2	Rangers	Methil
19:45		BBC Report; Rangers Report; SPFL Report	Daly 29'; Black 57'	Stadium: Bayview Stadium; Attendance: 1,827; Referee: George Salmond

3 December 2014 Semi-final	Alloa Athletic	3–2	Rangers	Alloa
19:30	Spence 72', 89'; McCord 74'	BBC Report; Rangers Report; SPFL Report	Miller 49'; Shiels 64'	Stadium: Recreation Park; Attendance: 2,443; Referee: John McKendrick

=== League Cup ===
26 August 2014 First round	Queen's Park	1–2	Rangers	Airdrie
19:45 BST	Quinn 31'	BBC Report; Rangers Report; SPFL Report	Boyd 7', 53'	Stadium: Excelsior Stadium; Attendance: 3,674; Referee: Alan Muir

16 September 2014 Second round	Rangers	1–0	Inverness Caledonian Thistle	Glasgow
19:45 BST	Macleod 78'	BBC Report; Rangers Report; SPFL Report		Stadium: Ibrox Stadium; Attendance: 15,208; Referee: Crawford Allan

23 September 2014 Third round	Falkirk	1–3	Rangers	Falkirk
19:45 BST	Loy 5'	BBC Report; Rangers Report; SPFL Report	Tudur Jones 7' (o.g.); Shiels 65'; Black 90+2'	Stadium: Falkirk Stadium; Attendance: 5,259; Referee: Alan Muir

28 October 2014 Quarter-final	Rangers	1–0	St Johnstone	Glasgow
19:15 GMT	Macleod 86'	BBC Report; Rangers Report; SPFL Report		Stadium: Ibrox Stadium; Attendance: 13,023; Referee: Steven McLean

1 February 2015 Semi-final	Celtic	2–0	Rangers	Glasgow
13:30 GMT	Griffiths 10'; Commons 31'	BBC Report; Rangers Report; SPFL Report		Stadium: Hampden Park; Attendance: 50,925; Referee: Craig Thomson

=== Scottish Cup ===
1 November 2014 Third Round	Dumbarton	0–1	Rangers	Dumbarton
15:00		BBC Report; Rangers Report	Boyd 45'	Stadium: Bet Butler Stadium; Attendance: 1,878; Referee: Bobby Madden

30 November 2014 Fourth Round	Rangers	3–0	Kilmarnock	Glasgow
12:45	Law 19', 84'; Boyd 72'	BBC Report; Rangers Report		Stadium: Ibrox Stadium; Attendance: 14,412; Referee: Brian Colvin

8 February 2015 Fifth Round	Rangers	1–2	Raith Rovers	Glasgow
15:00	Vučkić 62'	BBC Report; Rangers Report	Conroy 54'; Nadé 75'	Stadium: Ibrox Stadium; Attendance: 11,422; Referee: Bobby Madden

== Competitions ==
=== Overall ===
Competition	Started round	Current position / round	Final position / round	First match	Last match
Scottish Championship	8th	—	3rd	10 August	2 May
Scottish Premiership play-offs	Quarter-finals	—	Runners-up	9 May	31 May
Challenge Cup	1st Round	—	Semi-finals	5 August	3 December
League Cup	1st Round	—	Semi-finals	26 August	1 February
Scottish Cup	3rd Round	—	Fifth Round	2 November	8 February

Source: Competitions

=== Scottish Championship ===
==== Standings ====
Pos	Team	Pld	W	D	L	GF	GA	GD	Pts	Promotion, qualification or relegation
1	Heart of Midlothian (C, P)	36	29	4	3	96	26	+70	91	Promotion to the Premiership
2	Hibernian	36	21	7	8	70	32	+38	70	Qualification for the Premiership play-off semi-final
3	Rangers	36	19	10	7	69	39	+30	67	Qualification for the Premiership play-off quarter-final
4	Queen of the South	36	17	9	10	58	41	+17	60	Qualification for the Premiership play-off quarter-final
5	Falkirk	36	14	11	11	48	48	0	53	

Source: Soccerway
Rules for classification: 1) Points; 2) Goal difference; 3) Number of goals scored
(C) Champions; (P) Promoted

==== Results summary ====
Overall								Home						Away					
Pld	W	D	L	GF	GA	GD	Pts	W	D	L	GF	GA	GD	W	D	L	GF	GA	GD
36	19	10	7	69	39	+30	67	10	5	3	43	21	+22	9	5	4	26	18	+8

Last updated: 2 May 2015.
Source: Wikipedia article

==== Results by round ====
Round	1	2	3	4	5	6	7	8	9	10	11	12	13	14	15	16	17	18	19	20	21	22	23	24	25	26	27	28	29	30	31	32	33	34	35	36
Ground	H	A	H	H	H	A	H	A	A	H	A	H	H	A	H	A	H	A	H	A	H	A	A	H	A	A	H	H	A	H	H	A	H	A	H	A
Result	L	W	W	W	W	D	L	W	W	W	W	W	D	L	W	L	W	L	W	W	W	D	D	L	W	D	D	D	W	W	D	L	W	W	D	D
Position	8	4	3	2	1	2	2	2	2	2	2	2	2	2	2	2	2	2	2	2	2	2	2	3	2	3	3	3	3	3	3	3	3	2	3	3

Updated to match(es) played on 2 May 2015. Source: 2014–15 Scottish Championship
A = Away; H = Home; W = Win; D = Draw; L = Loss
