= Ownership of Rangers F.C. =

Ownership of the Scottish football club Rangers

Rangers is a Scottish football club based in Glasgow and founded in 1872. The club's corporate entity was created in 1899 when The Rangers Football Club Ltd was formed as a privately held company. In 2000, the then chairman and owner David Murray floated the club on the stock market which subsequently converted the private company into a public limited company (PLC).

In 2012, The Rangers Football Club PLC entered administration and the company's business and assets, including Rangers F.C., Ibrox Stadium and the Rangers Training Centre were bought by Sevco Scotland Ltd. Sevco Scotland Ltd later changed its name to The Rangers Football Club Ltd. The Rangers International Football Club Ltd (initially as a PLC) was then formed as a holding company by The Rangers Football Club Ltd, with the latter becoming a wholly owned subsidiary of the former.

On 30 May 2025, Rangers announced that a consortium headed by US businessman Andrew Cavenagh and 49ers Enterprises, the investment arm of the San Francisco 49ers, had purchased 51% of shares to complete a multi-million pound takeover of the club.

== Prior to incorporation ==
The football club was formed in 1872 and was operated by the four founders until its incorporation on 27 May 1899. When the club was incorporated, a limited company (The Rangers Football Club Ltd) was formed and the club then had its legal personality, with directors and liabilities in accordance with the Companies Act.

== Corporate history ==
=== Minority shareholdings ===
From the company's formation in 1899, no single shareholder obtained a large enough shareholding to have a majority (and thereby be deemed the owner). From 1963, John Lawrence (Glasgow) Ltd began increasing its shareholding in the company, eventually becoming the largest shareholder with 15%. John Lawrence of John Lawrence (Glasgow) Ltd, became the club's Chairman and served for nearly ten years, retiring in 1973 due to ill health. On Lawrence's death in 1977, his shareholding in the Lawrence Group, and in its business, was transferred to his grandson Lawrence Marlborough. The following years saw a steady increase in the Lawrence Group's shareholding in the club.

=== Lawrence Group ===
In 1985, the Lawrence Group increased its shareholding in Rangers to a 52% majority, following a deal with then club vice-chairman Jack Gillespie. In November 1988, head of the Lawrence Group Lawrence Marlborough sold the company to Murray International Holdings for £6 million.

=== Murray International Holdings ===
Between 1988 and 2011 Scottish steel magnate David Murray was the owner of Rangers, after he had purchased the company for £6 million, via his company Murray International Holdings.

During the late 1990s Murray increased the club's player transfer budget in an attempt to succeed in both domestic and European football. High-profile players such as Paul Gascoigne and Brian Laudrup joined the club during this time. After Dick Advocaat became manager, Murray again sanctioned some large transfer spending on players such as Tore Andre Flo and Ronald de Boer - the former being the most expensive player signed by a Scottish club.

The corporate identity controlling the club underwent a change in 2000 when Murray decided to list the company on the stock exchange, making it a public limited company. Murray stated his plan to grow Rangers into a global brand to compete with the likes of English Premier League champions Manchester United. The name of the company was subsequently amended to The Rangers Football Club Plc.

On 5 July 2002, Murray had relinquished the chairmanship and limited his day-to-day involvement in the club's running but his status as by far the largest share-holder remained. Murray's decisions while chairman continued to impact Rangers and several years of significant overspending saw debts of £65m being accrued. On 1 September 2004, Murray announced his return to the chairmanship, with debts having increased to £72m during his absence. A share rights-issue was quickly devised with a target to raise £57m in order to reduce the company's debt. In December 2004, the issue was concluded with £51.4m being raised, almost £6m less than hoped for, and with Murray responsible for over £50m of that through one of his other companies - Murray MHL Limited. Essentially by doing this, Murray increased his shareholding in Rangers to 91.8% of the total stock, and intrinsically link the finances of Rangers Football Club Plc with Murray MHL Limited.

During the course of Murray's ownership, payments to some staff and players were made via a scheme known as an Employee Benefit Trust, this occurred between 2001 and 2010. EBTs were reviewed by HMRC and deemed by them to be illegal tax avoidance schemes which allowed Rangers players and staff to pay less tax on what they were paid. Murray denied that any tax avoidance took place with regards to this EBT scheme during his stewardship. This ultimately led to HMRC posting Rangers with a fine of £49 million, inclusive of interest and penalties, and served to confirm the need, on Murray's part, to sell his shareholding in the club.

=== Whyte and The Rangers FC Group ===
After protracted takeover negotiations with David Murray, the club was bought by Scottish businessman Craig Whyte on 6 May 2011 for £1, through his company Wavetower Limited (subsequently renamed The Rangers FC Group Limited). The deal came with stipulations, such as paying off the club's £18m debt to Lloyds Banking Group, and making further investment in the team. Early into Whyte's reign at the club, doubts and allegations began to surface relating to his business past, most notably a documentary by BBC Scotland that reported Whyte had previously been banned from being a Director of any UK companies. It was also disclosed that Whyte did not pay the £18m Lloyds debt as stipulated in the takeover deal, but instead secured a £27m deal with ticketing company Ticketus against future season ticket sales, to pay the debt. On 13 February 2012 Whyte filed legal papers at the Court of Session giving notice of an intention to appoint Administrators.

On 14 February 2012, The Rangers Football Club Plc, which was subsequently renamed RFC 2012 plc, entered administration over non-payment of £9 million in PAYE and VAT taxes to HM Revenue and Customs. Entering administration meant the team was docked 10 points by the SPL, effectively ending its 2012 Championship challenge. In April 2012, the administrators estimated that the club's total debts could top £134m.

On 25 June 2012, the Crown Office asked Strathclyde Police to investigate the purchase of Rangers and the club's subsequent financial management during Whyte's tenure.

=== The Green consortium and floatation ===
Sevco Scotland Ltd was formed on 29 May 2012 as a means for Charles Green to acquire the assets of Rangers FC. Sevco Scotland Ltd (subsequently renamed The Rangers Football Club Ltd.) was formed to ensure that if the formation of a new company was required in the event of a CVA being rejected, then the club's corporate entity would be a Scottish registered company as it has always been. When the CVA later failed, the assets of The Rangers Football Club Plc (subsequently renamed RFC 2012 plc) were then sold for £5.5 million. Charles Green also incorporated another company, Sevco 5088 Limited, on 29 March 2012, which lent some money to The Rangers Football Club Ltd in May 2012.

Sevco Scotland Limited was formed in May 2012 to purchase the assets of The Rangers Football Club Plc (which was subsequently renamed RFC 2012 plc), incorporated in 1899, which went out of business and entered liquidation procedures on 14 June 2012. After Sevco purchased the business and assets of The Rangers Football Club Plc, including Rangers Football Club and Ibrox Stadium, several players agreed to have their contracts transferred to the new company. Some players left to join other clubs as free agents since their former employer had been in breach of contract. After an application to transfer the old company's Scottish Premier League membership was rejected, an application to join the Scottish Football League was accepted with the club being placed in the third division. The Rangers Football Club Plc's SFA membership share was transferred to Sevco Scotland Ltd on 27 July 2012. Sevco Scotland Ltd was renamed The Rangers Football Club Ltd on 31 July 2012.

On 14 June 2012, HMRC's formal rejection of the proposed CVA meant that the company would enter the liquidation process. The accountancy firm BDO were appointed to investigate financial mismanagement at the club. On the same day Sevco Scotland Ltd acquired various assets including Ibrox Stadium and Murray Park, as well as intellectual property, goodwill and various contracts.

As a result of the liquidation process, the extent to which Rangers can be regarded as a continuation of the club founded in 1872 has been interpreted differently. Rangers Football Club was described by some in the mainstream media as a "new club", whilst Chief Executive Charles Green maintained "this is still Rangers", with the SPL chairman Neil Doncaster saying "it is an existing club, even though it's a new company".

Towards the end of August 2012, it was reported that Arif Naqvi, chief executive of private equity firm Abraaj Capital, owned just under 18% of The Rangers F.C. Ltd's shares via Blue Pitch Holdings, after having agreed to invest £2m in June 2012. Other investors included Imran Ahmad and Richard Hughes, from Zeus Capital, owning 9.8% each (Hughes had a 6.8% stake in Rangers). Rangers manager Ally McCoist was reported to own a share of about 4.5% with Scottish-based businessman Ian Hart, who was part of the Blue Knights group, also owning a shareholding of 1.3%. The Blue Knights were one of several groups or individuals that had expressed an interest in taking over the club. Other shareholders in the club included Alessandro Celano and Chris Morgan.

On 16 November 2012, a company called Rangers International Football Club plc was formed and listed on the Alternative Investment Market of the London Stock Exchange and became the holding company for The Rangers Football Club Ltd., which, in turn, owns the football club.

After the formation of new holding and listed company for the club: Rangers International Football Club Plc ("RIFC"), it was reported in an AIM announcement on 5 December 2012 that Charles Green owned a 14.9% shareholding in the company, with Newcastle United owner Mike Ashley having an 8.9% stake. Green and Ashley's shares were projected to fall to 8.67% and 5.20% of the share capital of RIFC respectively after the company's flotation on the stock market and acquisition of the entire share capital of the club. Other shareholders, both before and after the flotation, were also revealed including Blue Pitch Holding, Margarita Funds Holding Trust, Craig Mather, Norne Anstalt, Legal & General Investment Management Limited, Insight Investment Management (Global) Limited, Cazenove Capital Management Limited, Hargreave Hale Limited and Artemis Investment Management LLP.

After departing as Chief Executive, Charles Green sold his shareholding to Sandy Easdale, co-owner of McGill's Bus Services in August 2013. Easdale increased his stake to 4.52% in November 2013, and then to 5.21% in September 2014. The latter gave Easdale control of 26.15% of the issued share capital, since he already held the voting rights for 20.94% of the company.

Isle of Man-based hedge fund Laxey Partners were revealed to be the new largest shareholder in RIFC in November 2013 with a 11.64% stake, and later further increased this to 16.3%. In September 2014, a share issue raised £3.13m.

In October 2014, Mike Ashley increased his shareholding to 8.92%. In December 2014, Laxey sold their shareholding to a group of businessmen made up of Douglas Park and existing shareholders George Letham and George Taylor. In January 2015, former Rangers director Dave King purchased 14.57% of RIFC's shares from Artemis and Milton.

=== Blue Knights ===
The start of 2015 saw Ashley's control over Rangers weakened as deals were made with a consortium led by Dave King, to purchase the shareholding of Laxey Partners which had stood at 16%. King took control of a 14.57% stake and two weeks later called for EGM on 16 January. During the run up to the EGM, the incumbent Rangers board agreed £10m funding deal with Sports Direct. The agreement saw Sports Direct hold a floating charge over Rangers Training Centre, Edmiston House, the Albion Car Park and the club's registered trademarks. Sports Direct was also transferred 26% of Rangers' share in Rangers Retail Limited (Rangers previously held 51% with Sports Direct holding 49%).

The month of February saw a large volume of shares purchased and Rangers supporters groups were heavily involved. With the writing apparently on the wall, Rangers director James Easdale resigned just over a week before the EGM and chairman Somers departed with four days to go. The SFA's investigation into Ashley concluded at the beginning of March with Ashley being deemed to have broken rules on dual ownership due to his influence on the affairs of Rangers, he was fined £7,500, and Rangers were subsequently fined £5,500 over a month later for their lack of governance. Just two days before the EGM, the clubs Nominated adviser, WH Ireland, resigned resulting shares in the Plc being suspended. The outcome of the EGM was a decisive victory for King's consortium with Derek Llambias and finance director Barry Leach being voted off the board and King, Paul Murray and John Giligan moving in. Both King and Murray subsequently applied to be passed as a fit and proper person by the SFA with the later being cleared at the beginning of May. Further board appointments were made with John Bennett and Chris Graham added to the Plc board as non-executive directors and James Blair was appointed company secretary, on the same day Rangers suspended Llambias, Leach and Sandy Easdale from its football club board pending an internal investigation.

Meanwhile, the police probed the role of Mike Ashley and Sports Direct in the Rangers takeover and searched the companies headquarters. This was rumored to be the reason that Ashley demanded the repayment of his £5m loan to the club. Rangers set the date of the general meeting for June 2015 and added its own resolutions and proposals. On 19 May King was passed fit and proper by the SFA and became chairman of the club on 22 May. On the same day King also loaned the club an additional £1.5m.

On 23 June 2017, Mike Ashley sold his entire Rangers shareholding to Club 1872 and Julian Wolhardt.

=== Cavenagh and 49ers Enterprises ===
On 30 May 2025, a US consortium led by health care business owner Andrew Cavenagh, and with backing from the invest arm of the San Francisco 49ers, completed a takeover of the Rangers by purchasing over 51% of all allocated share capital.

== Current ownership ==
In June 2025, the consortium Rangers FC LLC, headed by US businessman Andrew Cavenagh and 49ers Enterprises, the investment arm of the San Francisco 49ers, purchased 51% of shares to compete a multi-million pound takeover of the club.

Remaining major shareholders of the club included former chairman Douglas Park, George Taylor and Stuart Gibson, who all held at least a 5% shareholding.

Dave King, who had been the largest individual shareholder since leading the regime change in 2015, and John Bennett, chairman from 2023 to 2024, both divested their entire shareholding.

=== Board of directors ===
As of June 2025

Position	Name
Chairman	Andrew Cavenagh
Vice-chairman	Paraag Marathe
Non-executive director	Andrew Clayton
Non-executive director	John Halsted
Non-executive director	Gene Schneur
Non-executive director	Mark Taber
Non-executive director	George Taylor
Non-executive director	Fraser Thornton
