= 2015–16 Rangers F.C. season =

Rangers
2015–16 season
- Chairman: Dave King
- Manager: Mark Warburton
- Ground: Ibrox Stadium; Glasgow, Scotland (Capacity: 50,947)
- Scottish Championship: 1st (promoted)
- Scottish Cup: Runners-up
- League Cup: Third round
- Challenge Cup: Winners
- Top goalscorer: League: Martyn Waghorn (23); All: Martyn Waghorn (28)
- Highest home attendance: 50,349 vs Alloa Athletic (23 April)
- Lowest home attendance: 20,915 vs Cowdenbeath (10 January)
Home colours	Away colours

The 2015–16 season was the 136th season of competitive football by Rangers.

This was their second and final season in the second tier, and marked the end of their journey through the lower leagues.

== Overview ==
Rangers played a total of 50 competitive matches during the 2015–16 season.

In early June, Ibrox Stadium played host to the companies second EGM in just over three months. A majority of shareholders voted in favour of a board resolution to renegotiate existing retail agreements with Sports Direct and voted against the early repayment of a loan from Mike Ashley. Rangers made further appointments to the board with Stewart Robertson joining as managing director and Andrew Dickinson being promoted to financial director.

The spectre of the previous board loomed large at the beginning of the season as Police Scotland's investigation into the sale of Rangers' assets to a consortium led by Charles Green led to arrests and seven indictments. On 1 September, both Craig Whyte and Green were arrested as part of the inquiry into the "alleged fraudulent acquisition" of Rangers' assets in 2012. Just over two weeks later indictments were served on seven accused, including Green and Whyte, David Whitehouse, Paul Clark, David Grier, who were all working for administrators Duff and Phelps at the time, Gary Withey who worked for a law firm involved in the purchase of Rangers by Whyte and Imran Ahmad, a former Rangers commercial director. Indeed, the latter indicated that he would not co-operate with the proceedings, subsequently a warrant was issued for his arrest and charges against him were temporarily stopped. A week later, Green took the company to the Court of Session in an attempt to force the PLC to pay his legal fees with regards to the forthcoming trial, however, the action was dismissed by Lord Doherty a few months later and an appeal to the Inner House was also refused in March 2016. On 30 October, Rangers announced it was not appropriate to proceed with a share issue and listing on the ISDX market until the criminal proceedings being brought against Charles Green, Imran Ahmed, Craig Whyte and others was concluded. On 5 February 2016, prosecutors have withdrawn six of 15 charges brought against six men in the alleged Rangers fraud case which resulted in all charges against Duff and Phelps administrators David Whitehouse and Paul Clark being dropped, although prosecutors indicated there would be filing fresh charges against the pair. Charges against Green were also dropped meaning that the former chief executive of the club was not facing any. A few months later, in May 2016, it was announced that charges against Gary Withey and David Grier were dropped and they would not stand trial alongside former Rangers owner Craig Whyte, the only person still facing charges. In December 2020, the Lord Advocate James Wolffe admitted in court that the treatment of Whitehouse and Clark amounted to malicious prosecution, and they received a settlement of more than £20 million in compensation.

Fireworks night 2015 arrived a day early in Govan as 4 November proved to be a contentious day in the history of Rangers. The club's PLC owner, Rangers International Football Club, announced a loss of £7.5m for the year ending June 2015. This meant the company was required to find approximately £2.5m in order to cover expenses for the rest of the season. Moreover, the outcome of HMRC's appeal against the decision of the First-tier Tribunal regarding the previous owner and its use of EBT's. The Court of Session ruled that the use of Employee Benefit Trusts broke tax rules therefore the payments were eligible for tax deductions, although an appeal to the Supreme Court was sought less than a month later and granted in March 2016. This judgement caused debate in Scottish football as many people erroneously believed the decision made by the Nimmo Smith commission not to strip Rangers of titles was based on the outcome of the tax case. Coincidentally, the commission's ruling was taken to an arbitration tribunal by the club's owners with RIFC PLC disputing its liability for the £250,000 fine plus £150,000 in additional costs, imposed on the company that previously owned the club. The SPFL subsequently imposed this on the new owners of the club as part of the terms of the five way agreement. However, an independent SFA tribunal ruled that RIFC PLC was liable for the fine in March 2016. Further legal matters occurred a week later, although not directly involving Rangers, as Mike Ashley lodged a challenge to the SFA's decision to pass King as a fit and proper person by seeking a Judicial review, however, the litigation was abandoned in April 2016 after his legal team received information about King's finances which the SFA used in their fit and proper deliberations. Ashley had also raised court proceedings against Dave King, accusing him of breaching a court injunction regarding the commercial agreements between Rangers and Sports Direct, however, the Royal Courts of Justice dismissed the motion for him to be jailed, moreover, a further accusation that King committed contempt of court was cleared. In the end, the court action against King was discontinued by Sports Direct as the company halted litigation claiming a breach of confidentiality in relation to a commercial deal, in which the Judge called "ridiculous".

The end of November saw the PLC's Annual general meeting, however, prior to this Mike Ashley continued with his ligation against the company and successfully managed to have Resolution 11 withdrawn which would have allowed shareholders to block the voting rights of dual ownership shareholders. The AGM passed without major incident however, the Chairman Dave King announced the adoption of the Living wage for company employees and the repayment of a £5m loan from Ashley's Sports Direct. Although on 11 December, it was reported that the company had not repaid the £5m loan despite earlier claims to the contrary. That same day it was reported that former Rangers player Arnold Peralta had been shot dead in his hometown of La Ceiba, Honduras. On Christmas Eve Rangers announced that the loan had been repaid to Ashley in full and it was later revealed, on Ne'erday, that Rangers had borrowed £6.5m from King an others in order to do this. On 4 February, it was announced by the Rangers board that they had given Sports Direct formal notice that they wish to end their retail deal for club merchandise. On 18 May, Rangers indicated its intention to end the joint venture with Sports Direct for selling club kits and merchandise, this included the withdrawal of the rights to use club trademarks.

On the football front, Rangers appointed its fourteenth permanent manager on 15 June in the shape of Mark Warburton, who agreed a three-year contract. Warburton was joined at the club by former Rangers centre-back David Weir who became his assistant manager. The start to the season saw Rangers embark on a run of eleven straight victories in all competitions. This helped Warburton overtake former Rangers manager Bill Struth’s record of eight consecutive wins by a manager at the beginning of there Ibrox career. Ultimately, this would could not continue, the series of victories came to an abrupt halt in mid-September as the club suffered a 3–1 defeat to St Johnstone in the League Cup. Despite this, Rangers league form continued to impress with the team continuing a winning steak for the first eleven games of the season which gave the club an eight-point lead, over second place Hibernian, at the top of the table by late October. However, the side was to go through a poor run of form thereafter collecting eight points from a possible eighteen over the next six league games including two defeats to Hibernian and Falkirk respectively. This left Rangers tied with the Edinburgh club on forty-one points ahead of crucial match between the two during the festive period. Rangers played Hibernian on 28 December at Ibrox, beating Alan Stubbs' side 4-2 then embarked on an unbeaten run of ten matches, winning nine with only Alloa Athletic managing to get a draw. Alongside this rich vain of form, second placed Hibernian suffered a run of three defeats within a week to see them trail Rangers at the top of the table by fourteen points as the season entered March. The league crown was secured on 5 April at Ibrox and formed the first part of a brace of trophies within a week. The team qualified for its second Challenge Cup final in the space of three years with the match being played at Hampden Park for the first time in the competition's history. The match was played in front of a near sell out as Rangers ran out 4-0 winners over Scottish League One side Peterhead on 10 April. Similarly, in Scottish Cup, the club reached its second semi-final in three seasons, setting up the first Old Firm derby in over a year. A highly anticipated match ended with both sides tied after full and extra time with Rangers winning the penalty shoot-out to progress to the final. The semi-final heroics were ultimately for nothing as Rangers lost the 2016 Scottish Cup Final to Hibernian with the Edinburgh club scoring an injury time winner. However, their victory was marred by a pitch invasion by Hibernian fans at the full-time whistle. The SFA has said it is "appalled" by scenes of disorder and set-up a commission to review operational failings apparent from the day. Police Scotland also undertook investigations into the matter which included several assaults on Rangers players and staff.

The football departments scouting network was overhauled with the appointment of Frank McParland as the Head of Recruitment. On 18 December, Rangers announced a coaching and development partnership with Scottish Lowland League club Gala Fairydean Rovers which effectively saw the Galashiels side act as a feeder to Rangers. On 6 January, Rangers began preparation for life in the Scottish Premiership by signing Accrington Stanley duo Josh Windass and Matt Crooks on pre-contract agreements. However, further success in the transfer market was not automatically forthcoming with bids being rejected in January for Toumani Diagouraga and Michael O'Halloran by Brentford and St. Johnstone respectively, however, a deal for the latter was eventually agreed after prolonged negotiations.

== Players ==
=== Squad information ===
N	Pos.	Nat.	Name	Age	Since	App	Goals	Ends	Transfer fee	Notes
1	GK	(Scotland)	Cammy Bell	29	2013	57	0	2017	Free	
2	DF	(England)	James Tavernier	24	2015	50	15	2018	£0.2m	
3	DF	(Scotland)	Darren McGregor	30	2014	53	5	2016	Free	left on 24 August
4	DF	(Republic of Ireland)	Rob Kiernan	25	2015	45	0	2017	£0.2m	
5	DF	(Scotland)	Lee Wallace (captain)	28	2011	212	22	2017	£1.5m	
6	DF	(England)	Dominic Ball	20	2015	30	0	2016	Loan	
7	MF	(England)	Nicky Law	28	2013	122	26	2016	Free	
8	MF	(United States)	Gedion Zelalem	19	2015	28	0	2016	Loan	
9	FW	(Scotland)	Kenny Miller (vc)	36	2014	230	97	2017	Free	
10	MF	(England)	Nathan Oduwa	19	2015	19	1	2016	Loan	left on 17 January
11	MF	(Scotland)	David Templeton	27	2012	86	26	2016	£0.7m	
14	FW	(Scotland)	Nicky Clark	24	2013	107	24	2016	Free	
15	MF	(England)	Harry Forrester	25	2016 (Winter)	16	5	2019	Free	
16	MF	(Scotland)	Andy Halliday	24	2015	48	10	2020	Free	
17	MF	(Scotland)	Billy King	22	2016 (Winter)	13	1	2016	Loan	
18	MF	(Scotland)	Andy Murdoch	21	2012	23	1	2017	Youth system	out on season loan
19	FW	(Scotland)	Barrie McKay	21	2011	94	14	2018	Youth system	
20	MF	(Canada)	Fraser Aird	21	2011	85	12	2018	Youth system	out on six month loan
21	MF	(Scotland)	Robbie Crawford	23	2010	57	7	2017	Youth system	out on season loan
22	FW	(Northern Ireland)	Dean Shiels	31	2012	124	31	2016	Free	
23	MF	(Scotland)	Jason Holt	25	2015	45	11	2020	£0.065m	
25	GK	(England)	Wes Foderingham	25	2015	50	0	2018	Free	
26	DF	(Lithuania)	Marius Žaliūkas	31	2014	28	2	2016	Free	left on 28 August
27	DF	(Scotland)	Danny Wilson (2nd vc)	24	2015	66	2	2018	Free	
29	FW	(Scotland)	Michael O'Halloran	25	2015 (Winter)	13	3	2020	£0.5m	
30	FW	(Scotland)	Calum Gallagher	20	2010	7	1	2016	Youth system	left on 4 August
30	GK	(Poland)	Maciej Gostomski	27	2016 (Winter)	0	0	2016	Free	left on 14 March
31	DF	(Canada)	Luca Gasparotto	20	2011	4	0	2016	Youth system	out on season loan
32	GK	(Scotland)	Liam Kelly	21	2012	0	0	2018	Youth system	out on six month loan
33	FW	(England)	Martyn Waghorn	26	2015	36	28	2018	£0.2m	
37	MF	(Scotland)	Scott Roberts	20	2014	0	0	2017	Youth system	
42	FW	(Scotland)	Ryan Hardie	19	2013	10	2	2018	Youth system	
45	MF	(Northern Ireland)	Jordan Thompson	19	2015	2	0	2016	Free	
48	MF	(Scotland)	Tom Walsh	19	2012	13	0	2017	Youth system	out on six month loan
50	DF	(Scotland)	Ross McCrorie	17	2014	0	0	2017	Youth system	
51	GK	(Scotland)	Robby McCrorie	17	2014	0	0	2017	Youth system	
52	DF	(Scotland)	Ross Lyon	18	2014	0	0	2017	Youth system	
62	MF	(Scotland)	Liam Burt	17	2015	2	0	2018	Youth system	

- Last updated: 23 May 2016
- Source: Players transfer and Wikipedia players' articles
- Ordered by position on pitch.

=== Transfers ===
==== In ====
===== First-team =====
No.	Pos.	Nat.	Name	Age	Moving from	Type	Transfer window	Ends	Transfer fee	Source
27	DF	(Scotland)	Danny Wilson	23	Heart of Midlothian	Transfer	Summer	2018	Free	
4	DF	(Republic of Ireland)	Rob Kiernan	24	Wigan Athletic (England)	Transfer	Summer	2017	£0.2m	
25	GK	(England)	Wes Foderingham	24	Swindon Town (England)	Transfer	Summer	2018	Free	
45	MF	(Northern Ireland)	Jordan Thompson	18	Manchester United (England)	Transfer	Summer	2017	Free	
16	MF	(Scotland)	Andy Halliday	23	Bradford City (England)	Transfer	Summer	2017	Free	
33	FW	(England)	Martyn Waghorn	25	Wigan Athletic (England)	Transfer	Summer	2018	£0.2m	
2	DF	(England)	James Tavernier	23	Wigan Athletic (England)	Transfer	Summer	2018	£0.2m	
23	MF	(Scotland)	Jason Holt	23	Heart of Midlothian	Transfer	Summer	2018	£0.065m	
10	MF	(England)	Nathan Oduwa	19	Tottenham Hotspur (England)	Loan	Summer	2016	n/a	
6	DF	(England)	Dominic Ball	20	Tottenham Hotspur (England)	Loan	Summer	2016	n/a	
8	MF	(United States)	Gedion Zelalem	18	Arsenal (England)	Loan	Summer	2016	n/a	
15	MF	(England)	Harry Forrester	24	Doncaster Rovers (England)	Transfer	Winter	2016	Free	
30	GK	(Poland)	Maciej Gostomski	27	Lech Poznań (Poland)	Transfer	Winter	2016	Free	
17	FW	(Scotland)	Billy King	21	Heart of Midlothian	Loan	Winter	2016	n/a	
29	FW	(Scotland)	Michael O'Halloran	25	St Johnstone	Transfer	Winter	2020	£0.5m	

Total expenditure: £1.165m

===== Academy =====
No.	Pos.	Nat.	Name	Age	Moving from	Type	Transfer window	Ends	Transfer fee	Source
55	FW	(England)	Jordan Gibson	17	Alvechurch (England)	Transfer	Summer	2016	Free	
44	DF	(Scotland)	Tom Lang	18	Birmingham City (England)	Transfer	Summer	2016	Free	
	MF	(Scotland)	Jack Adamson	16	Hibernian	Transfer	n/a	2016	Free	
	MF	(England)	Mekhi Leacock-McLeod	19	Wolverhampton Wanderers (England)	Transfer	Winter	2016	Free	
	FW	(Scotland)	Rory Currie	17	Celtic	Transfer	Winter	2016	Free	

Total expenditure: £0m

==== Out ====
===== First-team =====
No.	Pos.	Nat.	Name	Age	Moving to	Type	Transfer window	Transfer fee	Source
15	FW	(Scotland)	Kris Boyd	31	Kilmarnock	End of contract	Summer	n/a	
20	MF	(Scotland)	Kyle Hutton	24	Queen of the South	End of contract	Summer	n/a	
8	MF	(Scotland)	Ian Black	30	Shrewsbury Town (England)	End of contract	Summer	n/a	
9	FW	(Republic of Ireland)	Jon Daly	32	Raith Rovers	End of contract	Summer	n/a	
31	GK	(England)	Steve Simonsen	36	Pune City (India)	End of contract	Summer	n/a	
3	DF	(Tunisia)	Bilel Mohsni	27	Angers (France)	End of contract	Summer	n/a	
23	DF	(Scotland)	Richard Foster	29	Ross County	End of contract	Summer	n/a	
2	DF	(Scotland)	Steven Smith	29	Kilmarnock	End of contract	Summer	n/a	
16	DF	(France)	Sébastien Faure	24	Free agent	End of contract	Summer	n/a	
25	GK	(England)	Lee Robinson	28	Free agent	End of contract	Summer	n/a	
6	DF	(Scotland)	Lee McCulloch	37	Kilmarnock	End of contract	Summer	n/a	
10	MF	(Slovenia)	Haris Vučkić	22	Newcastle United (England)	Loan Return	Summer	n/a	
28	DF	(England)	Remie Streete	20	Newcastle United (England)	Loan Return	Summer	n/a	
17	MF	(England)	Gaël Bigirimana	21	Newcastle United (England)	Loan Return	Summer	n/a	
27	DF	(Switzerland)	Kevin Mbabu	20	Newcastle United (England)	Loan Return	Summer	n/a	
29	FW	(Northern Ireland)	Shane Ferguson	23	Newcastle United (England)	Loan Return	Summer	n/a	
30	FW	(Scotland)	Calum Gallagher	20	St Mirren	Transfer	Summer	Free	
3	DF	(Scotland)	Darren McGregor	30	Hibernian	Contract terminated	Summer	Free	
26	DF	(Lithuania)	Marius Žaliūkas	31	Žalgiris (Lithuania)	Contract terminated	Summer	Free	
21	MF	(Scotland)	Robbie Crawford	22	Alloa Athletic	Loan	Summer	n/a	
18	MF	(Scotland)	Andy Murdoch	19	Cowdenbeath	Loan	Summer	n/a	
32	GK	(Scotland)	Liam Kelly	19	East Fife	Loan	Winter	n/a	
18	MF	(Scotland)	Andy Murdoch	20	Queen of the South	Loan	Winter	n/a	
48	MF	(Scotland)	Tom Walsh	19	Dumbarton	Loan	Winter	n/a	
10	MF	(England)	Nathan Oduwa	19	Tottenham Hotspur (England)	Loan Return	Winter	n/a	
20	MF	(Canada)	Fraser Aird	20	Vancouver Whitecaps FC (Canada)	Loan	Winter	n/a	
42	FW	(Scotland)	Ryan Hardie	18	Raith Rovers	Loan	n/a	n/a	
45	MF	(Northern Ireland)	Jordan Thompson	19	Airdrieonians	Loan	n/a	n/a	
30	GK	(Poland)	Maciej Gostomski	27	Bytovia Bytów (Poland)	Contract terminated	n/a	Free	

Last updated: 17 March 2016
Total income: £0m

===== Academy =====
No.	Pos.	Nat.	Name	Age	Moving to	Type	Transfer window	Transfer fee	Source
33	MF	(Northern Ireland)	Kristian Gibson	20	Glentoran (Northern Ireland)	End of contract	Summer	n/a	
36	FW	(Curaçao)	Jamie Burrows	20	Yeovil Town (England)	End of contract	Summer	n/a	
57	FW	(Cameroon)	Junior Ogen	17	Free agent	End of contract	Summer	n/a	
51	DF	(Northern Ireland)	Scot Whiteside	17	Partick Thistle	End of contract	Summer	n/a	
56	GK	(Scotland)	Lewis McMinn	17	Falkirk	End of contract	Summer	n/a	
31	DF	(Canada)	Luca Gasparotto	19	Greenock Morton	Loan	Summer	n/a	
34	MF	(Scotland)	Darren Ramsay	20	Arbroath	Loan	Summer	n/a	
40	DF	(Scotland)	Greg Pascazio	19	Montrose	Contract terminated	Summer	Free	
39	DF	(Scotland)	Ryan Sinnamon	19	Falkirk	Loan	Summer	n/a	
41	FW	(Scotland)	Danny Stoney	19	Free agent	Contract terminated	Summer	Free	
38	DF	(Scotland)	Craig Halkett	20	Berwick Rangers	Loan	n/a	n/a	
38	DF	(Scotland)	Craig Halkett	20	Livingston	Contract terminated	Winter	Free	
50	DF	(Scotland)	Ross McCrorie	17	Ayr United	Loan	n/a	n/a	

Last updated: 26 February 2016
Total income: £0m

==== New contracts ====
===== First-team =====
No.	Pos.	Nat.	Name	Age	Status	Contract length	Expiry date	Source
9	FW	(Scotland)	Kenny Miller	35	Signed	1 year	May 2017	
16	MF	(Scotland)	Andy Halliday	24	Signed	4 years	May 2020	
23	MF	(Scotland)	Jason Holt	22	Signed	4 years	May 2020	
19	MF	(Scotland)	Barrie McKay	21	Signed	2 years & 6 months	May 2018	
15	MF	(England)	Harry Forrester	25	Signed	3 years	May 2019	

Last updated: 17 November 2015

===== Academy =====
No.	Pos.	Nat.	Name	Age	Status	Contract length	Expiry date	Source
34	MF	(Scotland)	Darren Ramsay	19	Signed	1 year	May 2016	
39	DF	(Scotland)	Ryan Sinnamon	19	Signed	1 year	May 2016	
38	DF	(Scotland)	Craig Halkett	20	Signed	1 year	May 2016	
43	DF	(Scotland)	David Brownlie	18	Signed	1 year	May 2016	
53	MF	(Scotland)	Josh Jeffries	17	Signed	1 year	May 2016	
56	DF	(Scotland)	Lewis White	17	Signed	1 year	May 2016	
36	MF	(Scotland)	Dylan Dykes	19	Signed	1 year	May 2016	
42	FW	(Scotland)	Ryan Hardie	18	Signed	2 years	May 2018	
62	MF	(Scotland)	Liam Burt	17	Signed	2 years	May 2018	
65	MF	(Scotland)	Jamie Barjonas	17	Signed	2 years	May 2018	
67	GK	(Scotland)	Kieran Wright	15	Signed	2 years	May 2018	
63	DF	(Scotland)	Kyle Bradley	17	Signed	2 years	May 2018	
61	DF	(Scotland)	Jason Krones	17	Signed	2 years	May 2018	
64	DF	(Scotland)	Aidan Wilson	17	Signed	2 years	May 2018	
60	FW	(Scotland)	Grant Nelson	17	Signed	1 year	May 2017	

Last updated: 3 March 2016

=== Squad statistics ===
				Total			Scottish Championship		Scottish Cup		League Cup		Challenge Cup	
No.	Pos.	Nat.	Name	Sts	App	Gls	App	Gls	App	Gls	App	Gls	App	Gls
1	GK	(Scotland)	Cammy Bell											
2	DF	(England)	James Tavernier	50	50	15	36	10	6		3	3	5	2
4	DF	(Republic of Ireland)	Rob Kiernan	45	45		33		5		3		4	
5	DF	(Scotland)	Lee Wallace	50	50	9	36	7	6	2	3		5	
6	DF	(England)	Dominic Ball	24	30		21		5		1		3	
7	MF	(England)	Nicky Law	13	26	1	18	1	3		2		3	
8	MF	(United States)	Gedion Zelalem	21	28		21		4		2		1	
9	FW	(Scotland)	Kenny Miller	31	43	21	32	14	6	2	2	1	3	4
10	MF	(England)	Nathan Oduwa	11	19	1	15	1			2		2	
11	MF	(Scotland)	David Templeton	2	3	1	1				1	1	1	
14	FW	(Scotland)	Nicky Clark	7	32	6	22	2	4	1	2	1	4	2
15	MF	(England)	Harry Forrester	8	17	5	11	4	5	1			1	
16	MF	(Scotland)	Andy Halliday	48	48	10	35	5	6	2	3	1	4	2
17	MF	(Scotland)	Billy King	6	13	1	12	1					1	
19	MF	(Scotland)	Barrie McKay	45	48	9	34	6	6	2	3		5	1
20	MF	(Canada)	Fraser Aird		4		3						1	
22	FW	(Northern Ireland)	Dean Shiels	9	43	2	31	1	5		3	1	4	
23	MF	(Scotland)	Jason Holt	42	45	12	32	10	6	1	2		5	1
25	GK	(England)	Wes Foderingham	50	50		36		6		3		5	
27	DF	(Scotland)	Danny Wilson	42	42	1	30	1	6		2		4	
29	FW	(Scotland)	Michael O'Halloran	9	13	3	12	3					1	
33	FW	(England)	Martyn Waghorn	35	36	28	25	20	4	4	3	1	4	3
42	FW	(Scotland)	Ryan Hardie		4		1		1		1		1	
45	MF	(Northern Ireland)	Jordan Thompson		2		2							
48	MF	(Scotland)	Tom Walsh	2	2		1						1	
62	MF	(Scotland)	Liam Burt		2		2							

Last updated: 21 May 2016
Source: Wikipedia article
Ordered by position
0 shown as blank

=== Goal scorers ===
N	P	Nat.	Name	League	Scottish Cup	League Cup	Challenge Cup	Total
33	FW	(England)	Martyn Waghorn	20	4	1	3	28
9	FW	(Scotland)	Kenny Miller	14	2	1	4	21
2	DF	(England)	James Tavernier	10		3	2	15
23	MF	(Scotland)	Jason Holt	10	1		1	12
16	MF	(Scotland)	Andy Halliday	5	2	1	2	10
5	DF	(Scotland)	Lee Wallace	7	2			9
19	MF	(Scotland)	Barrie McKay	6	2		1	9
14	FW	(Scotland)	Nicky Clark	2	1	1	2	6
15	MF	(England)	Harry Forrester	4	1			5
22	MF	(Northern Ireland)	Dean Shiels	2		1		3
29	FW	(Scotland)	Michael O'Halloran	3				3
11	MF	(Scotland)	David Templeton			1		1
7	MF	(England)	Nicky Law	1				1
10	MF	(England)	Nathan Oduwa	1				1
27	DF	(Scotland)	Danny Wilson	1				1
17	MF	(Scotland)	Billy King	1				1
			Own goal	1			2	3

Last updated: 21 May 2016
Source: Match reports
Only competitive matches

=== Disciplinary record ===
N	P	Nat.	Name	Scottish Championship			Scottish Cup			League Cup			Challenge Cup			Total			Notes
N	P	Nat.	Name	Yellow card	Second yellow card	Red card	Yellow card	Second yellow card	Red card	Yellow card	Second yellow card	Red card	Yellow card	Second yellow card	Red card	Yellow card	Second yellow card	Red card	Notes
2	DF	(England)	James Tavernier	3			2			1						6			
4	DF	(Republic of Ireland)	Rob Kiernan	6												6			
5	DF	(Scotland)	Lee Wallace	5									1			6			
6	DF	(England)	Dominic Ball	3			2									5			
7	MF	(England)	Nicky Law	1												1			
9	FW	(Scotland)	Kenny Miller	2												2			
10	MF	(England)	Nathan Oduwa	1									1			2			
14	FW	(Scotland)	Nicky Clark				1						1			2			
15	MF	(England)	Harry Forrester				1									1			
16	MF	(Scotland)	Andy Halliday	4	1	1	1						1			6	1	1	
19	MF	(Scotland)	Barrie McKay	1									1			2			
22	MF	(Northern Ireland)	Dean Shiels	1									2			3			
23	MF	(Scotland)	Jason Holt	1			1									2			
27	DF	(Scotland)	Danny Wilson	6									1			7			
29	FW	(Scotland)	Michael O'Halloran	1												1			
33	FW	(England)	Martyn Waghorn	3						1			1			5			

Last updated: 21 May 2016
Source: Wikipedia articles
Ordered by (red card) , (second yellow card) and (yellow card)
(yellow card) = Number of bookings; (second yellow card) = Number of sending offs after a second yellow card; (red card) = Number of sending offs by a direct red card.

=== Awards ===
N	P	Nat.	Name	Award	Date	From	Source
-	MAN	(England)	Mark Warburton	Championship Manager of the Month	August	Scottish Professional Football League	
2	DF	(England)	James Tavernier	Championship Player of the Month	August	Scottish Professional Football League	
-	MAN	(England)	Mark Warburton	Championship Manager of the Month	September	Scottish Professional Football League	
33	FW	(England)	Martyn Waghorn	Championship Player of the Month	September	Scottish Professional Football League	
-	MAN	(England)	Mark Warburton	Championship Manager of the Month	January	Scottish Professional Football League	
9	FW	(Scotland)	Kenny Miller	Championship Player of the Month	January	Scottish Professional Football League	
-	MAN	(England)	Mark Warburton	Manager of the Year	April	Professional Footballers' Association Scotland	
5	DF	(Scotland)	Lee Wallace	Championship Player of the Year	April	Professional Footballers' Association Scotland	
19	MF	(Scotland)	Barrie McKay	Goal of the season	April	Professional Footballers' Association Scotland	
2	DF	(England)	James Tavernier	Goal of the season	June	Scottish Professional Football League	

== Club ==
=== Technical Staff ===
Position	Staff
Manager	(England) Mark Warburton
Assistant manager	(Scotland) David Weir
First-team coach	(Scotland) David Weir
Head of Performance	(Scotland) Jim Henry (until 3 July) (Scotland) Craig Flannigan (from 16 October)
Goalkeepers coach	(Scotland) Jim Stewart

== Matches ==
=== Scottish Championship ===
Game	Date	Tournament	Round	Ground	Opponent	Score^{1}	Report
3	7 August 2015	Scottish Championship	1	H	St Mirren	3–1	Report / Report link; Kick off / 19:45 BST; Attendance / 49,216; Referee / Kevin Clancy (Scotland); Rangers / St Mirren; 4' Wallace; 26' Wallace; 90' Shiels / 28' Howieson
4	16 August 2015	Scottish Championship	2	A	Alloa Athletic	5–1	Report / Report link; Kick off / 12:30 BST; Attendance / 3,047; Referee / Crawford Allan (Scotland); Alloa Athletic / Rangers; 7' Chopra / 4' Tavernier; 9' (pen.) Waghorn; 39' Holt; 43' Miller; 85' Miller
6	23 August 2015	Scottish Championship	3	H	Hibernian	1–0	Report / Report link; Kick off / 12:30 BST; Attendance / 49,220; Referee / Steven McLean (Scotland); Rangers / Hibernian; 66' Tavernier
8	30 August 2015	Scottish Championship	4	A	Queen of the South	5–1	Report / Report link; Kick off / 12:30 BST; Attendance / 5,858; Referee / Bobby Madden (Scotland); Queen of the South / Rangers; (red card) 48' Lyle; 81' Smith / 26' Halliday; 52' (pen.) Waghorn; 59' Holt; 64' McKay; 76' (pen.) Waghorn
9	5 September 2015	Scottish Championship	5	H	Raith Rovers	5–0	Report / Report link; Kick off / 15:00 BST; Attendance / 44,050; Referee / Brian Colvin (Scotland); Rangers / Raith Rovers; 4' Wallace; 45' Tavernier; 55' McKay; 64' (pen.) Waghorn; 69' (pen.) Waghorn
10	12 September 2015	Scottish Championship	6	H	Livingston	3–0	Report / Report link; Kick off / 15:00 BST; Attendance / 44,832; Referee / Greg Aitken (Scotland); Rangers / Livingston; 16' Wallace; 41' Waghorn; 80' Law
11	19 September 2015	Scottish Championship	7	A	Dumbarton	2–1	Report / Report link; Kick off / 15:00 BST; Attendance / 1,978; Referee / Alan Muir (Scotland); Dumbarton / Rangers; (red card) 72' Buchanan; 90' (pen.) Fleming / 64' Waghorn; 73' (pen.) Waghorn
13	27 September 2015	Scottish Championship	8	A	Greenock Morton	4–0	Report / Report link; Kick off / 12:30 BST; Attendance / 7,392; Referee / Willie Collum (Scotland); Greenock Morton / Rangers; / 12' (pen.) Waghorn; 22' Waghorn; 34' Tavernier; 81' Waghorn
14	3 October 2015	Scottish Championship	9	H	Falkirk	3–1	Report / Report link; Kick off / 15:00 BST; Attendance / 45,135; Referee / John McKendrick (Scotland); Rangers / Falkirk; 3' Shiels; 81' Tavernier; 90+2' Wallace / 17' Vaulks
15	17 October 2015	Scottish Championship	10	H	Queen of the South	2–1	Report / Report link; Kick off / 15:00 BST; Attendance / 44,133; Referee / Barry Cook (Scotland); Rangers / Queen of the South; 53' Holt; 90' Waghorn / 35' Lyle
17	25 October 2015	Scottish Championship	11	A	St Mirren	1–0	Report / Report link; Kick off / 12:30 GMT; Attendance / 5,477; Referee / Steven McLean (Scotland); St Mirren / Rangers; / 25' Holt
18	1 November 2015	Scottish Championship	12	A	Hibernian	1–2	Report / Report link; Kick off / 12:30 GMT; Attendance / 14,412; Referee / John Beaton (Scotland); Hibernian / Rangers; 11' Cummings; 73' Hanlon / 47' (o.g.) McGregor
19	7 November 2015	Scottish Championship	13	H	Alloa Athletic	4–0	Report / Report link; Kick off / 15:00 GMT; Attendance / 43,242; Referee / Stephen Finnie (Scotland); Rangers / Alloa Athletic; 10' Waghorn; 14' Tavernier; 42' Waghorn; 90+2' Clark / (red card) 79' Ferns
20	21 November 2015	Scottish Championship	15	A	Livingston	1–1	Report / Report link; Kick off / 15:00 GMT; Attendance / 6,505; Referee / George Salmond (Scotland); Livingston / Rangers; 51' Hippolyte / 22' Holt
22	1 December 2015	Scottish Championship	14	H	Dumbarton	4–0	Report / Report link; Kick off / 19:45 GMT; Attendance / 37,182; Referee / Crawford Allan (Scotland); Rangers / Dumbarton; 47' Holt; 60' Waghorn; 81' Oduwa; 88' (pen.) Halliday / (red card) 88' Saunders
23	12 December 2015	Scottish Championship	17	H	Greenock Morton	2–2	Report / Report link; Kick off / 15:00 GMT; Attendance / 41,816; Referee / Don Robertson (Scotland); Rangers / Greenock Morton; 2' Miller; 84' Waghorn / 31' (o.g.) Tavernier; 82' McCluskey
24	19 December 2015	Scottish Championship	18	A	Falkirk	1–2	Report / Report link; Kick off / 12:30 GMT; Attendance / 7,488; Referee / Willie Collum (Scotland); Falkirk / Rangers; 3' (pen.) Baird; 55' Vaulks / 15' McKay
25	28 December 2015	Scottish Championship	19	H	Hibernian	4–2	Report / Report link; Kick off / 15:00 GMT; Attendance / 49,995; Referee / Bobby Madden (Scotland); Rangers / Hibernian; 33' Holt; 43' Holt; 65' Clark; (red card) 70' Halliday; 89' Waghorn / 23' Cummings; 86' Malonga
26	2 January 2016	Scottish Championship	20	A	Dumbarton	6–0	Report / Report link; Kick off / 15:00 GMT; Attendance / 1,894; Referee / Craig Charleston (Scotland); Dumbarton / Rangers; / 42' Miller; 59' Miller; 64' Miller; 71' Waghorn; 81' Halliday; 88' Tavernier
28	16 January 2016	Scottish Championship	21	H	Livingston	4–1	Report / Report link; Kick off / 15:00 GMT; Attendance / 42,906; Referee / Craig Thomson (Scotland); Rangers / Livingston; 8' Wilson; 22' (pen.) Waghorn; 35' Miller; 41' Waghorn / 55' Buchanan
29	25 January 2016	Scottish Championship	22	A	Greenock Morton	2–0	Report / Report link; Kick off / 19:45 GMT; Attendance / 5,778; Referee / Barry Cook (Scotland); Greenock Morton / Rangers; / 26' Miller; 70' McKay; (yellow card) 71' (red card) Halliday
30	30 January 2016	Scottish Championship	23	H	Falkirk	1–0	Report / Report link; Kick off / 15:00 GMT; Attendance / 46,980; Referee / Kevin Clancy (Scotland); Rangers / Falkirk; 90+1' King
31	2 February 2016	Scottish Championship	16	A	Raith Rovers	1–0	Report / Report link; Kick off / 19:45 GMT; Attendance / 5,493; Referee / Euan Anderson (Scotland); Raith Rovers / Rangers; / 44' Halliday
33	13 February 2016	Scottish Championship	24	A	Alloa Athletic	1–1	Report / Report link; Kick off / 15:00 GMT; Attendance / 3,100; Referee / Don Robertson (Scotland); Alloa Athletic / Rangers; 61' Marr / 83' O'Halloran
35	21 February 2016	Scottish Championship	25	A	Queen of the South	1–0	Report / Report link; Kick off / 16:00 GMT; Attendance / 5,449; Referee / Stephen Finnie (Scotland); Queen of the South / Rangers; / 64' Miller
36	27 February 2016	Scottish Championship	26	H	St Mirren	1–0	Report / Report link; Kick off / 15:00 GMT; Attendance / 46,366; Referee / John McKendrick (Scotland); Rangers / St Mirren; 86' Forrester
37	1 March 2016	Scottish Championship	27	H	Raith Rovers	2–0	Report / Report link; Kick off / 19:45 GMT; Attendance / 40,662; Referee / Craig Charleston (Scotland); Rangers / Raith Rovers; 27' Forrester; 51' Wallace
39	11 March 2016	Scottish Championship	29	H	Greenock Morton	3–1	Report / Report link; Kick off / 19:45 GMT; Attendance / 45,072; Referee / Nick Walsh (Scotland); Rangers / Greenock Morton; 43' Miller; 48' Miller; 56' Wallace / 22' Johnstone
40	18 March 2016	Scottish Championship	30	A	Falkirk	2–3	Report / Report link; Kick off / 19:45 GMT; Attendance / 7,804; Referee / Kevin Clancy (Scotland); Falkirk / Rangers; 72' Alston; 77' Hippolyte; 90+2' McHugh / 7' Miller; 9' McKay
41	26 March 2016	Scottish Championship	31	H	Queen of the South	4–3	Report / Report link; Kick off / 15:00 GMT; Attendance / 46,117; Referee / Crawford Allan (Scotland); Rangers / Queen of the South; 14' Forrester; 46' O'Halloran; 51' Halliday; 55' Tavernier / 25' (pen.) Russell; 57' Oliver; 90' Millar
42	2 April 2016	Scottish Championship	32	A	Raith Rovers	3–3	Report / Report link; Kick off / 15:00 BST; Attendance / 6,943; Referee / Euan Anderson (Scotland); Raith Rovers / Rangers; 25' Longridge; 38' Craigen; 90+4' Panayiotou / 30' Forrester; 35' O'Halloran; 49' Miller
43	5 April 2016	Scottish Championship	33	H	Dumbarton	1–0	Report / Report link; Kick off / 19:45 BST; Attendance / 48,568; Referee / Steven McLean (Scotland); Rangers / Dumbarton; 50' Tavernier
46	20 April 2016	Scottish Championship	28	A	Hibernian	2–3	Report / Report link; Kick off / 19:45 BST; Attendance / 12,231; Referee / Kevin Clancy (Scotland); Hibernian / Rangers; 5' Cummings; 18' Stokes; 58' Gunnarsson / 41' Holt; 85' McKay
47	23 April 2016	Scottish Championship	35	H	Alloa Athletic	1–1	Report / Report link; Kick off / 12:30 BST; Attendance / 50,349; Referee / Craig Charleston (Scotland); Rangers / Alloa Athletic; 45' Tavernier / 8' Duffy
48	26 April 2016	Scottish Championship	34	A	Livingston	0–1	Report / Report link; Kick off / 19:45 BST; Attendance / 5,021; Referee / Greg Aitken (Scotland); Livingston / Rangers; 45+1' Halkett
49	1 May 2016	Scottish Championship	36	A	St Mirren	2–2	Report / Report link; Kick off / 12:30 BST; Attendance / 5,933; Referee / Don Robertson (Scotland); St Mirren / Rangers; 40' Gallagher; 90+2' Morgan / 54' Miller; 88' Holt

Last updated: 1 May 2016
Source: Wikipedia article
^{1}Rangers goals come first.
National flags for Ground and Opponent columns are only shown when different from that of Rangers.
M = Match; Ground: H = Home, A = Away, N = Neutral, HR = Home replacement, AR = Away replacement.

=== Scottish Cup ===
Game	Date	Tournament	Round	Ground	Opponent	Score^{1}	Report
27	10 January 2016	Scottish Cup	R4	H	Cowdenbeath	5–1	Report / Report link; Kick off / 13:00 GMT; Attendance / 20,915; Referee / Steven McLean (Scotland); Rangers / Cowdenbeath; 19' Wallace; 33' McKay; 48' Waghorn; 55' (pen.) Waghorn; 78' (pen.) Waghorn / 40' Brett
32	6 February 2016	Scottish Cup	R5	H	Kilmarnock	0–0	Report / Report link; Kick off / 12:30 GMT; Attendance / 33,581; Referee / Bobby Madden (Scotland); Rangers / Kilmarnock; / (red card) 89' Higginbotham
34	16 February 2016	Scottish Cup	R5 R	A	Kilmarnock	2–1	Report / Report link; Kick off / 19:45 GMT; Attendance / 13,179; Referee / Bobby Madden (Scotland); Kilmarnock / Rangers; 7' McKenzie / 3' (pen.) Waghorn; 90+2' Clark
38	5 March 2016	Scottish Cup	QF	H	Dundee	4–0	Report / Report link; Kick off / 12:30 GMT; Attendance / 30,944; Referee / Alan Muir (Scotland); Rangers / Dundee; 1' Forrester; 47' Holt; 54' Halliday; 84' Wallace
45	17 April 2016	Scottish Cup	SF	N	Celtic	2–2 (5-4 pen.)	Report / Report link; Kick off / 12:00 BST; Attendance / 50,069; Referee / Craig Thomson (Scotland); Rangers / Celtic; 16' Miller; 96' McKay / 50' Sviatchenko; 106' Rogic
50	21 May 2016	Scottish Cup	F	N	Hibernian	2–3	Report / Report link; Kick off / 15:00 BST; Attendance / 50,701; Referee / Steven McLean (Scotland); Rangers / Hibernian; 27' Miller; 64' Halliday / 3' Stokes; 80' Stokes; 90+2' Gray

Last updated: 21 May 2016
Source: Wikipedia article
^{1}Rangers goals come first.
National flags for Ground and Opponent columns are only shown when different from that of Rangers.
M = Match; Ground: H = Home, A = Away, N = Neutral, HR = Home replacement, AR = Away replacement.

=== League Cup ===
Game	Date	Tournament	Round	Ground	Opponent	Score^{1}	Report
2	2 August 2015	League Cup	R1	H	Peterhead	3–0	Report / Report link; Kick off / 15:00 BST; Attendance / 25,608; Referee / Greg Aitken (Scotland); Rangers / Peterhead; 41' Templeton; 76' Miller; 82' Tavernier
7	26 August 2015	League Cup	R2	A	Airdrieonians	5–0	Report / Report link; Kick off / 19:45 BST; Attendance / 7,006; Referee / Euan Anderson (Scotland); Airdrieonians / Rangers; / 5' Clark; 14' Halliday; 15' Waghorn; 84' Shiels; 88' Tavernier
12	22 September 2015	League Cup	R3	H	St Johnstone	1–3	Report / Report link; Kick off / 19:15 BST; Attendance / 27,094; Referee / Kevin Clancy (Scotland); Rangers / St Johnstone; 62' Tavernier / 19' Davidson; 29' Lappin; 46' O'Halloran

Last updated: 6 September 2015
Source: Wikipedia article
^{1}Rangers goals come first.
National flags for Ground and Opponent columns are only shown when different from that of Rangers.
M = Match; Ground: H = Home, A = Away, N = Neutral, HR = Home replacement, AR = Away replacement.

=== Challenge Cup ===
Game	Date	Tournament	Round	Ground	Opponent	Score^{1}	Report
1	25 July 2015	Challenge Cup	R1	A	Hibernian	6–2	Report / Report link; Kick off / 12:30 BST; Attendance / 11,225; Referee / Willie Collum (Scotland); Hibernian / Rangers; 14' Stanton; 61' (pen.) Cummings / 39' Tavernier; 44' Waghorn; 47' Waghorn; 62' Halliday; 77' Miller; 82' Miller
5	19 August 2015	Challenge Cup	R2	A	Ayr United	2–0	Report / Report link; Kick off / 19:45 BST; Attendance / 7,468; Referee / Stephen Finnie (Scotland); Ayr United / Rangers; / 15' Clark; 43' McKay
16	20 October 2015	Challenge Cup	QF	H	Livingston	1–0	Report / Report link; Kick off / 19:45 BST; Attendance / 17,386; Referee / Andrew Dallas (Scotland); Rangers / Livingston; 75' Clark
21	28 November 2015	Challenge Cup	SF	H	St Mirren	4–0	Report / Report link; Kick off / 12:15 GMT; Attendance / 22,369; Referee / Bobby Madden (Scotland); Rangers / St Mirren; 34' Holt; 77' Miller; 84' Waghorn; 90+1' (o.g.) Kelly
44	10 April 2016	Challenge Cup	F	N	Peterhead	4–0	Report / Report link; Kick off / 15:00 BST; Attendance / 48,133; Referee / George Salmond (Scotland); Rangers / Peterhead; 17' (o.g.) Gilchrist; 40' Tavernier; 85' (pen.) Halliday; 89' Miller

Last updated: 10 April 2016
Source: Wikipedia article
^{1}Rangers goals come first.
National flags for Ground and Opponent columns are only shown when different from that of Rangers.
M = Match; Ground: H = Home, A = Away, N = Neutral, HR = Home replacement, AR = Away replacement.

=== Friendlies ===
Game

Date

21 July 2015
Tournament

Friendly
Round

Ground

H
Opponent

Burnley
Score^{1}

0–1
Report

Report	Report link
Kick off	19:45 BST
Attendance	22,344
Referee	Steven McLean (Scotland)
Rangers	Burnley
	35' Arfield

Last updated: 6 July 2015
Source: Wikipedia article
^{1}Rangers goals come first.
National flags for Ground and Opponent columns are only shown when different from that of Rangers.
M = Match; Ground: H = Home, A = Away, N = Neutral, HR = Home replacement, AR = Away replacement.

== Competitions ==
=== Overall ===
Competition	Started round	Current position / round	Final position / round	First match	Last match
Scottish Championship	3rd	—	1st	7 August	1 May
Scottish Cup	Fourth Round	—	Runners-up	10 January	21 May
League Cup	First Round	—	Third Round	2 August	22 September
Challenge Cup	First Round	—	Winners	25 July	10 April

Source: Competitions

=== Scottish Championship ===
==== Standings ====
Pos	Team	Pld	W	D	L	GF	GA	GD	Pts	Promotion, qualification or relegation
1	Rangers (C, P)	36	25	6	5	88	34	+54	81	Promotion to the Premiership
2	Falkirk	36	19	13	4	61	34	+27	70	Qualification for the Premiership play-off semi-finals
3	Hibernian	36	21	7	8	59	34	+25	70	Qualification for the Europa League second qualifying round and for the Premiership play-off quarter-finals (Note: Hibernian qualified for the Europa League second qualifying round by winning the 2015–16 Scottish Cup.)
4	Raith Rovers	36	18	8	10	52	46	+6	62	Qualification for the Premiership play-off quarter-finals
5	Greenock Morton	36	11	10	15	39	42	−3	43	

Source: Soccerway
Rules for classification: 1) Points; 2) Goal difference; 3) Number of goals scored
(C) Champions; (P) Promoted

==== Results summary ====
Overall								Home						Away					
Pld	W	D	L	GF	GA	GD	Pts	W	D	L	GF	GA	GD	W	D	L	GF	GA	GD
36	25	6	5	88	34	+54	81	16	2	0	48	13	+35	9	4	5	40	21	+19

Last updated: 1 May 2016.
Source: Wikipedia article

==== Results by round ====
Round	1	2	3	4	5	6	7	8	9	10	11	12	13	14	15	16	17	18	19	20	21	22	23	24	25	26	27	28	29	30	31	32	33	34	35	36
Ground	H	A	H	A	H	H	A	A	H	H	A	A	H	H	A	A	H	A	H	A	H	A	H	A	A	H	H	A	H	A	H	A	H	A	H	A
Result	W	W	W	W	W	W	W	W	W	W	W	L	W	W	D	W	D	L	W	W	W	W	W	D	W	W	W	L	W	L	W	D	W	L	D	D
Position	3	1	1	1	1	1	1	1	1	1	1	1	1	1	1	1	1	1	1	1	1	1	1	1	1	1	1	1	1	1	1	1	1	1	1	1

Updated to match(es) played on 1 May 2016. Source: 2014–15 Scottish Championship
A = Away; H = Home; W = Win; D = Draw; L = Loss
