= Tom Walsh (footballer) =

Scottish footballer (born 1996)

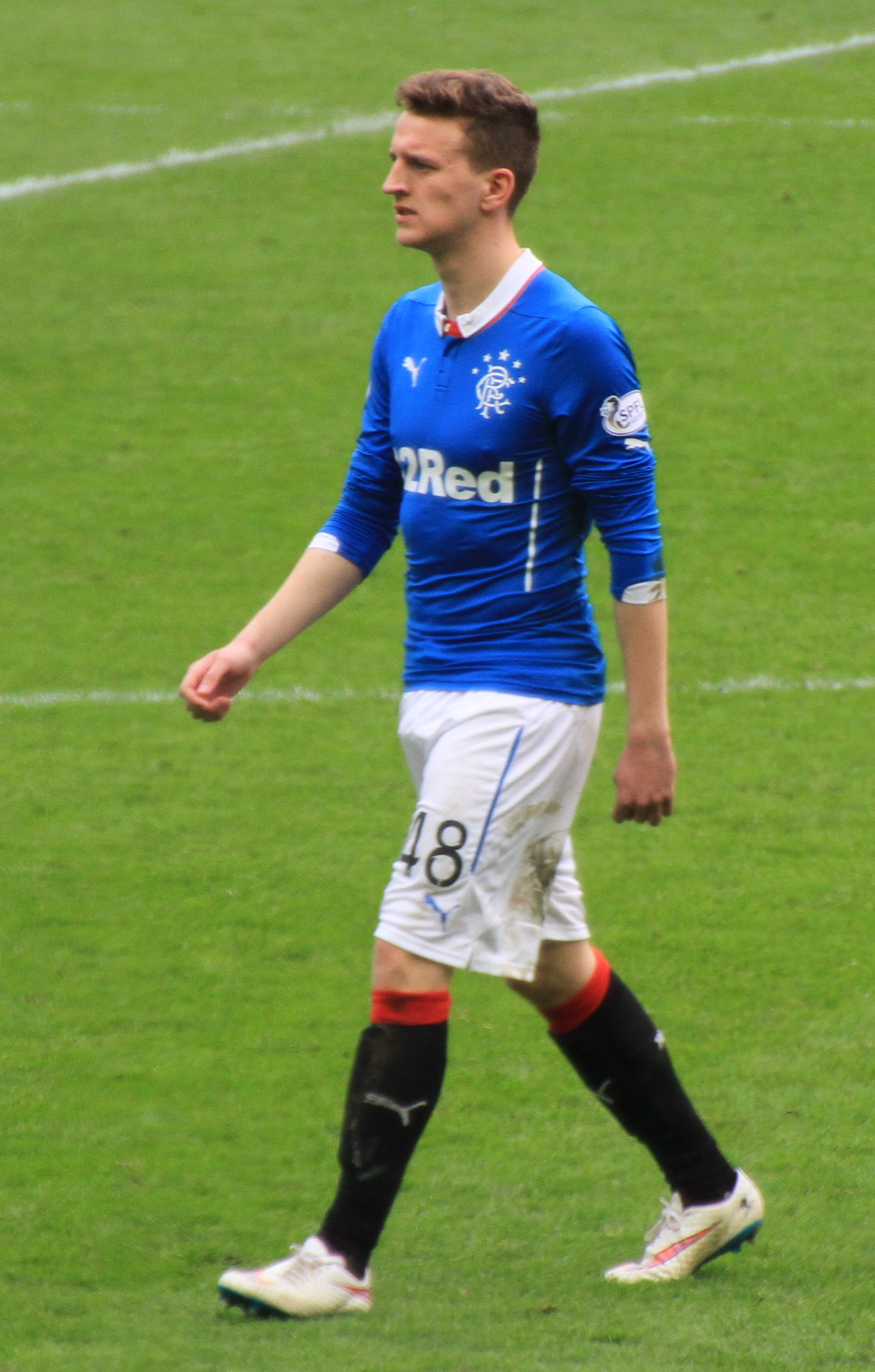
- Walsh playing for Rangers in 2015

Personal information
- Date of birth: 11 July 1996 (age 30)
- Place of birth: Irvine, Scotland
- Position: Winger

Youth career
- 2007–2012: Rangers

Senior career*
Years	Team	Apps	(Gls)
2012–2017	Rangers	10	(0)
2014	→ Stenhousemuir (loan)	9	(2)
2016	→ Dumbarton (loan)	14	(1)
2016–2017	→ St Mirren (loan)	10	(3)
2017	Limerick	2	(0)
2017–2018	Dumbarton	28	(3)
2018–2020	Inverness Caledonian Thistle	47	(9)
2020–2021	Ayr United	18	(3)
2021–2023	Inverness Caledonian Thistle	27	(4)

International career^{‡}
2011–2012	Scotland U16	9	(4)
2012	Scotland U17	5	(0)
2013–2014	Scotland U19	7	(0)
- * Club domestic league appearances and goals as of 20:37, 10 August 2023 (UTC) ‡ National team caps and goals as of 17:47, 11 August 2019 (UTC)

Tom Walsh (born 11 July 1996) is a Scottish footballer who most recently played for Inverness Caledonian Thistle in the Scottish Championship. He became the youngest player to make an appearance for Rangers in Scottish league football, when he played for them aged 16 in 2012. He also had loan spells with Stenhousemuir, Dumbarton and St Mirren during his Ibrox career. Since leaving Rangers, Walsh has had spells with Limerick in the League of Ireland and Dumbarton. Walsh would spend two years with Inverness in his first spell, before joining Ayr United for a season. He represented Scotland at various youth international levels.

== Early life ==
Walsh is from Troon, Ayrshire and was educated at Marr College in the town.

== Club career ==
Walsh joined Rangers' Academy in 2007. He made his first-team debut for Rangers on 8 December 2012, aged only 16 years and 150 days, in a Scottish Third Division match against Stirling Albion. Walsh became the youngest post-war Scottish football league debutant for Rangers and second youngest competitive debutant ever for the club, behind Derek Ferguson who made his debut in a League Cup match against Queen of the South in 1983, aged 16 years and 24 days.

The following season saw Walsh suffer with injury, initially sustaining an ankle injury and then a recurring hamstring problem kept him out for the whole of the 2013–14 season After finding opportunities in the first team difficult to come by and in a bid to improve his fitness levels after a long injury, Walsh joined the then Scottish League One side Stenhousemuir on loan for the first half of the 2014–15 season. Prior to going on loan Walsh had signed a new contract extension with Rangers until 2017. He made his debut for Stenhousemuir nearly three weeks later, on 20 September, against Peterhead, after recovering from a further hamstring injury. He scored his first professional goal in his second appearance for Stenhousemuir on 18 October, against Stirling Albion, adding the fourth in a 4–0 win.

After returning from his loan spell, Walsh featured once during Kenny McDowall's three months in charge of the first-team. However, upon the appointment of Stuart McCall as interim first-team manager, Walsh then began to play a more prominent role in the first-team squad. He joined fellow Scottish Championship club Dumbarton on loan in January 2016. He scored his first goal for the Sons in a 4–2 win over Queen of the South. On 17 July 2016, Walsh joined Scottish Championship club St Mirren on loan until January 2017. Walsh was released by Rangers on 18 January 2017. After leaving Rangers he played two games as a substitute for Limerick in the League of Ireland against Shamrock Rovers and Derry City.

He returned to Dumbarton on a one-year deal in June 2017. After a year with Dumbarton, Walsh moved North, signing for Inverness Caledonian Thistle. Walsh rejected a new contract offer in 2020, choosing to leave the club as a free agent.

After leaving Inverness Caledonian Thistle Walsh joined his local team Ayr United. Walsh would struggle with injury early on, but returned in the latter half of the season to help the club stay up in the Championship.

In June 2021, Walsh would return to former club Inverness Caledonian Thistle on a two-year deal.

== International career ==
Walsh has represented Scotland at various age levels.

== Personal life ==
Walsh is the cousin of professional golfer Jack McDonald.

== Career statistics ==
As of 14:49, 10 August 2019 (UTC)

Appearances and goals by club, season and competition
Club	Season	League			National Cup		League Cup		Other		Total	
Club	Season	Division	Apps	Goals	Apps	Goals	Apps	Goals	Apps	Goals	Apps	Goals
Rangers	2012–13	Scottish Third Division	1	0	0	0	0	0	0	0	1	0
Rangers	2013–14	Scottish League One	0	0	0	0	0	0	0	0	0	0
Rangers	2014–15	Scottish Championship	8	0	0	0	0	0	2 (Note: Appearances in 2015 Scottish Premiership Play-offs)	0	10	0
Rangers	2015–16	Scottish Championship	1	0	0	0	0	0	1 (Note: Appearance in Scottish Challenge Cup)	0	2	0
Rangers	2016–17	Scottish Premiership	0	0	0	0	0	0	—		0	0
Rangers	Rangers total		10	0	0	0	0	0	3	0	13	0
Stenhousemuir (loan)	2014–15	Scottish League One	9	2	1	0	0	0	0	0	10	2
Dumbarton (loan)	2015–16	Scottish Championship	14	1	2	0	0	0	—		16	1
St Mirren (loan)	2016–17	Scottish Championship	10	3	0	0	3	1	3	0	16	4
Limerick	2017	Irish Premier Division	2	0	0	0	0	0	0	0	2	0
Dumbarton	2017–18	Scottish Championship	28	3	3	0	2	0	8	0	41	3
Inverness Caledonian Thistle	2018–19	Scottish Championship	30	6	5	2	8	2	4	0	43	10
Inverness Caledonian Thistle	2019–20	Scottish Championship	17	3	0	0	4	0	0	0	6	1
Career total			120	18	11	2	15	3	18	0	147	21
