= Lewis Macleod (footballer) =

Scottish footballer

Personal information
- Full name: Lewis Kenneth Macleod
- Date of birth: 16 June 1994 (age 32)
- Place of birth: Wishaw, Scotland
- Height: 5 ft 9 in (1.76 m)
- Position: Central midfielder

Team information
- Current team: Rangers (U14 coach)

Youth career
- Newmains Hammers
- –2004: Livingston
- 2004–2012: Rangers

Senior career*
Years	Team	Apps	(Gls)
2012–2015	Rangers	52	(11)
2015–2019	Brentford	41	(4)
2019–2020	Wigan Athletic	12	(0)
2020–2021	Plymouth Argyle	15	(0)
Total		120	(15)

International career
2009–2010	Scotland U16	6	(0)
2010–2011	Scotland U17	13	(0)
2012	Scotland U18	2	(1)
2012–2013	Scotland U19	6	(2)
2012	Scotland U21	8	(2)
- * Club domestic league appearances and goals

Lewis Kenneth Macleod (born 16 June 1994) is a Scottish former professional footballer who played as a midfielder. He came to prominence with Rangers in Scotland and was a product of the club's academy. He later played in England for Brentford, Wigan Athletic and Plymouth Argyle. Macleod represented Scotland from under-16 to under-21 level.

== Club career ==
=== Rangers ===
==== Early years ====
Macleod began his career with youth club Newmains Hammers, playing a year above his age-group, before joining Livingston. He signed for Scottish Premier League club Rangers as a 10-year-old in 2004 and progressed through the youth system at Murray Park. Macleod was called up to the first team squad for the first time for a league match versus Motherwell on 31 March 2012 and he remained an unused substitute during the 2–1 victory. It was his only involvement in the first team squad during the 2011–12 season.

==== Breakthrough (2012–2013) ====
After Rangers entered administration in February 2012, the Scottish Football Association imposed a transfer embargo on the club. This created opportunities for players within the youth and reserve ranks, including Macleod. Macleod made his professional debut in a Scottish Challenge Cup first round match versus Brechin City on 29 July 2012. He started the game and Rangers went through to the second round after a 2–1 extra-time victory, with Macleod's corner setting up the winning goal – a 102nd-minute header by Lee McCulloch.

Macleod went on to hold down a regular starting place in the team and signed a five-year contract extension on 13 September 2012. He scored his first goal for the club in a 4–1 victory over Montrose on 23 September, while also claiming the man of the match award. Macleod continued his starting run and good form through to January 2013, scoring in home and away matches versus Elgin City. A knee injury suffered against Montrose on 26 January kept him sidelined until the final game of the 2012–13 season against Berwick Rangers. Macleod made 29 appearances and scored three goals during Rangers' 2012–13 Third Division title-winning season. In addition to the November 2012 Scottish League Young Player of the Month award, Macleod won the Rangers Young Player of the Year award.

==== 2013–2014 ====
Macleod began the 2013–14 Scottish League One season in good form, hitting four goals in a seven-game spell, the most notable being an overhead kick in a 2–0 victory over Ayr United on 6 October 2013. He held down a regular starting place, but again his season was cut short in January 2014, after an adverse reaction to a viral infection affected the muscles around his heart. In March 2014, manager Ally McCoist allayed fears that Macleod's career could be under threat. Macleod failed to appear again during the 2013–14 season and finished the campaign with 24 appearances and five goals. In his absence, Rangers won the Scottish League One title to seal a place in the Scottish Championship for the 2014–15 season, with Macleod receiving a winners' medal.

Macleod made a successful recovery from his health problems and scored on his comeback in a closed-doors friendly at Rangers Training Centre versus Fulham in July 2014. He began the 2014–15 season in good form, scoring four goals in his first four appearances of the season and four goals in 9 matches from September through to November 2014. A match-winning bicycle kick versus Livingston on 4 October was voted Rangers' Goal of the Season and he won the October 2014 Scottish League Young Player of the Month award. After suffering a serious hamstring injury during a 3–2 defeat to Alloa Athletic on 3 December 2014, it was reported that Macleod would be out until 2015, but the Alloa match turned out to be his final appearance in a Rangers shirt. On 31 December 2014, it was announced that Macleod had left Rangers. His involvement in the 2014–15 season ended with 21 appearances and eight goals. Macleod made 74 appearances and scored 16 goals during his 2 1/2 years as a first team player at Ibrox.

=== Brentford ===
==== 2015–2016 ====
On 31 December 2014, Macleod moved to England to sign for Championship club Brentford for an undisclosed fee on a 3 1/2-year contract, effective 3 January 2015. The fee was later reported by The Sunday Post to be £850,000, with add-ons raising the amount to up to £1.3 million. Having failed to recover from the hamstring injury suffered in his last match while a Rangers player, Macleod's recovery suffered a setback when he tweaked the hamstring again in training. He finally made his first appearance in a Brentford shirt with 45 minutes in a Development Squad defeat to Nottingham Forest on 28 March 2015, but two weeks later, manager Mark Warburton ruled Macleod out of first team contention for the rest of the 2014–15 season. In an apparent U-turn, Macleod won his maiden first team call-up for Brentford's playoff semi-final first leg versus Middlesbrough on 8 May. He remained an unused substitute during the 2–1 defeat and was replaced on the bench by Chris Long for the second leg, with the ensuing 5–1 aggregate loss ending Brentford's season.

Macleod's rehabilitation away from the first team squad saw him miss the entire 2015–16 pre-season. He returned to the Development Squad in October 2015 and made seven appearances either side of a recurrence of his hamstring injury in mid-November 2015. He finally made his first team debut versus Brighton & Hove Albion on 5 February 2016, when he replaced Josh McEachran after 82 minutes of the 3–0 defeat. Later that month, Macleod suffered a slight medial ligament injury in training and was not included in any further squads during the 2015–16 season.

==== 2016–2019 ====
After returning to fitness for the 2016–17 pre-season, Macleod made his first competitive start for the club on the opening day of the regular season, playing 82 minutes of a 2–1 defeat to Huddersfield Town, before being replaced by Philipp Hofmann. Macleod made 12 further appearances before suffering a serious knee injury during a West London derby versus Queens Park Rangers on 28 October 2016. In December 2016, he signed a one-year contract extension, which would keep him at Griffin Park until the end of the 2018–19 season.

After recovering from the knee injury and then suffering a hamstring problem in October 2017, Macleod made his first appearance for over 13 months as a second-half substitute for Sergi Canós in a 3–1 victory over West London rivals Fulham on 2 December 2017. After just one FA Cup start and sporadic substitute cameos, Macleod made his first league start of the 2017–18 season versus Middlesbrough on 17 March 2018 and scored his first goal for the club with the equaliser in a 1–1 draw. He finished the 2017–18 season with 11 appearances and one goal.

Macleod entered the 2018–19 season fully fit and held down a starting place through much of the first four months of the campaign. After scoring his third goal of the season with an injury time equaliser versus West Bromwich Albion on 3 December 2018, he suffered a hamstring injury. After returning to fitness, Macleod's reluctance to sign a new contract meant that he made just one further appearance before the end of the season. Macleod departed Brentford when his contract expired at the end of the 2018–19 season and he finished his career at Griffin Park with 43 appearances and four goals.

=== Wigan Athletic ===
On 12 July 2019, Macleod signed a one-year contract with Championship club Wigan Athletic on a free transfer. He was largely out of favour during the 2019–20 season and made just 12 appearances before his contract expired.

=== Plymouth Argyle ===
On 17 August 2020, Macleod signed a one-year contract with newly promoted League One club Plymouth Argyle on a free transfer. During a 2020–21 season affected by a torn medial knee ligament, he made 17 appearances and was released when his contract expired.

=== Free agency and retirement ===
In September 2021, it was reported that Macleod had undergone surgery during the 2021 off-season on the medial knee ligament problem which blighted his spell with Plymouth Argyle. Expecting to miss the entire 2021–22 season, he focused on working towards his coaching badges. In September 2022, Macleod announced that he had retired from football and was still in rehabilitation for his knee injury.

== International career ==
=== U16–U19 ===
Macleod represented the Scotland national team from under-16 to under-21 level. He won six under-16 caps, which included three of Scotland's 2009 Victory Shield matches. He was an under-17 regular between January 2010 and March 2011 and won four of his seven caps during Scotland's unsuccessful 2011 European Under-17 Championship qualifying campaign. By April 2012 he had progressed to the under-18 squad and won two caps in a pair of friendlies against Serbia and scored his first international goal in a 4–1 win in the second match. Macleod made five appearances for the under-19 squad in September and October 2012 (scoring in a 4–0 2013 European Under-19 Championship qualifying rout of Armenia) and scored his second under-19 goal in a 2–2 elite qualifying draw with Belgium on 24 May 2013. His under-19 career ended after his sixth and final cap against Georgia on 26 May 2013, an 3–1 elite qualifying round defeat which ended the under-19s' chances of qualifying for the tournament finals.

=== U21 ===
Macleod made his under-21 debut while an under-19 regular and received his first call up for a friendly versus Portugal on 14 November 2012. He made his debut in the 3–2 defeat, coming on as a 75th-minute substitute for Kenny McLean. On 14 October 2013, Macleod scored his first under-21 goal in a 2–1 defeat to Georgia and he made six appearances during Scotland's unsuccessful 2015 European U21 Championship qualifying campaign. After nearly two years away from international football due to injuries, Macleod was recalled to the under-21 squad for two 2017 European U21 Championship qualifiers in September 2016, but he withdrew due to injury.

=== Full ===
On 4 November 2014, manager Gordon Strachan called Macleod into the senior Scottish squad for the first time, ahead of a Euro 2016 qualifier against the Republic of Ireland and a friendly against England. Strachan stated that Macleod was "not just coming along to make up the numbers", but he featured only in the England match as an unused substitute.

== Style of play ==
Macleod stated that he likes "to get forward, but I also like to help out defensively too. I like to play either a number 8 or a number 10 role". Plymouth Argyle manager Ryan Lowe described him as "a fantastic number four. He can play in the eight position as well. He has got fantastic vision and fantastic ability to hit most passes".

== Coaching career ==
In March 2024, Macleod returned to Rangers as an academy coach. He initially held a part-time role with the club's under-14 team.

== Personal life ==
Macleod attended Newmains Primary School in Wishaw and is a former pupil of Coltness High School. His father Kenny played junior football for Wishaw and was on the books at Barnsley as a youth. He is the cousin of former goalkeeper David McEwan. As well as football, Macleod also excelled in golf at school, playing for his school team and winning tournaments. While sitting out the 2021–22 season due to injury rehabilitation, Macleod worked as a personal trainer at a gym in Wishaw.

== Career statistics ==
Appearances and goals by club, season and competition
Club	Season	League			National cup (Note: Includes Scottish Cup, FA Cup)		League cup (Note: Includes Scottish League Cup, EFL Cup)		Europe		Other		Total	
Club	Season	Division	Apps	Goals	Apps	Goals	Apps	Goals	Apps	Goals	Apps	Goals	Apps	Goals
Rangers	2011–12	Scottish Premier League	0	0	0	0	0	0	0	0	—		0	0
Rangers	2012–13	Scottish Third Division	21	3	3	0	3	0	—		2 (Note: Appearances in Scottish Challenge Cup)	0	29	3
Rangers	2013–14	Scottish League One	18	5	2	0	1	0	—		3	0	24	5
Rangers	2014–15	Scottish Championship	13	3	2	0	3	2	—		3	3	21	8
Rangers	Total		52	11	7	0	7	2	0	0	8	3	74	16
Brentford	2014–15	Championship	0	0	0	0	—		—		0	0	0	0
Brentford	2015–16	Championship	1	0	0	0	0	0	—		—		1	0
Brentford	2016–17	Championship	13	0	0	0	0	0	—		—		13	0
Brentford	2017–18	Championship	10	1	1	0	0	0	—		—		11	1
Brentford	2018–19	Championship	17	3	0	0	1	0	—		—		18	3
Brentford	Total		41	4	1	0	1	0	—		0	0	43	4
Wigan Athletic	2019–20	Championship	12	0	0	0	0	0	—		—		12	0
Plymouth Argyle	2020–21	League One	15	0	0	0	2	0	—		0	0	17	0
Career Total			120	15	8	0	10	2	0	0	8	3	146	20

== Honours ==
Rangers

- Scottish League One: 2013–14
- Scottish Football League Third Division: 2012–13

Individual

- Scottish Football League Young Player of the Month: November 2012, October 2014
- Rangers Young Player of the Year: 2012–13
