= Remie Streete =

English footballer

Personal information
- Full name: Remie Streete
- Date of birth: 2 November 1994 (age 31)
- Place of birth: Aylesbury, England
- Height: 1.89 m (6 ft 2 1/2 in)
- Position: Defender

Youth career
- 1999–2008: Boldon Colts
- 2008–2011: Newcastle United

Senior career*
Years	Team	Apps	(Gls)
2011–2015	Newcastle United	0	(0)
2014	→ Port Vale (loan)	2	(0)
2015	→ Rangers (loan)	0	(0)
2015–2017	Port Vale	50	(5)
Total		52	(5)
- * Club domestic league appearances and goals

Remie Streete (born 2 November 1994) is an English former professional footballer who played as a defender. He is the son of Floyd Streete.

He turned professional at Newcastle United in June 2011 and had brief loan spells at Port Vale and Rangers before he joined Port Vale on a free transfer in June 2015. He left Vale following the club's relegation out of EFL League One in May 2017.

== Career ==
=== Newcastle United ===
Born in Aylesbury, England, Streete grew up in South Shields and played for Boldon Colts from the age of five to 13 before rejecting interest from Sunderland to join the Newcastle United academy in 2008. He made his debut for the under-18s against Crewe Alexandra on 20 March 2010. He was given the inaugural Jack Hixon Award in 2010. He signed professional terms with the club in June 2011, with the three-and-a-half-year contract starting on his 17th birthday.

In 2012, Streete won the Wor Jackie Award, honouring the club's Young Player of the Year. He ruptured his ankle ligaments in a reserve derby in March 2012 and was ruled out for ten months following surgery. In February 2014, reserve team coach Willie Donachie was forced to resign from the club after striking Streete after the teenager gave away a penalty in a defeat to Sunderland reserves.

==== Loan to Port Vale ====
He joined League One side Port Vale on loan on 9 October 2014, with Rob Page's "Valiants" yet to keep a clean sheet in the 2014–15 season. He had been linked with a move to Vale Park for a number of weeks, but the loan deal was delayed after Alan Pardew named him in Newcastle's travelling party to Crystal Palace and Stoke City. He made his professional debut in the Football League at Vale Park on 25 October, coming on for Carl Dickinson at half-time, and he helped the club to record their first clean sheet of the season with a 3–0 victory over Leyton Orient. His loan deal was then extended by a further two months. On 12 November, Streete was recalled by Newcastle United following injuries to three of their regular centre-backs.

==== Loan to Rangers ====
On 2 February 2015, Streete joined Scottish Championship club Rangers on loan until the end of the 2014–15 season, along with Newcastle teammates Gaël Bigirimana, Shane Ferguson, Kevin Mbabu and Haris Vučkić. The move reportedly guaranteed him first-team football, as Rangers caretaker manager Kenny McDowall claimed the club's management instructed him to play all five Newcastle players in the first XI. Yet only Streete and Vučkić started the next game, a Scottish Cup defeat to Raith Rovers at Ibrox Stadium, which saw Streete leave the pitch with an injury before half-time.

Newcastle released him at the end of the 2014–15 season, having requested a free transfer away from St James' Park to find first-team football elsewhere.

=== Port Vale ===
Streete signed a two-year contract with Port Vale in June 2015, stating that he decided to commit himself to the "Valiants" due to the appreciation shown to him by the club's supporters following his previous loan spell. He started the 2015–16 season competing with Richard Duffy and Ryan Inniss for one of two available centre-back places. However, he then also fell behind Ryan McGivern in the pecking order, and failed to make an appearance for four months after playing in the 2–0 FA Cup defeat to Exeter City on 6 December.

He started the 2016–17 season in a centre-back partnership with Nathan Smith and scored his first goal in professional football on 13 August to secure a 2–0 home win over Southend United. His goal and performance saw him named in the Football League Paper's League One Team of the Day. Manager Bruno Ribeiro stated that: "for me he is a top player and can play in the Premier League. He has the quality for that". He started every league game before picking up "a rare injury to the back of his knee" in a 2–0 defeat to Millwall at The Den on 14 February. The club were relegated into EFL League Two at the end of the campaign, and Streete was released in May 2017 after manager Michael Brown was unable to match his current wages in the club's reduced budget. Streete issued a statement to give thanks to "Rob Page, Bruno Ribeiro and Michael Brown for believing in me... and, most importantly, I would like to thank the fans who gave their support, week in, week out, to myself and my team mates".

Streete had a trial at AFC Wimbledon in July 2018 and impressed manager Neal Ardley, though he was not offered a contract. He returned to train with former club Port Vale in January 2019. However, defence was not a priority area for manager Neil Aspin. He went on to trial at Notts County in July 2019.

== Personal life ==
He is the son of former Cambridge United and Wolverhampton Wanderers defender Floyd Streete. His half-brother Cameron is also a professional footballer who played for Djurgården and now for Landskrona. He had a daughter with his partner, Natalie Lawrence, and began coaching his daughter's team, Boldon Girls Blues under-8s, in 2023.

== Career statistics ==
Club performance
Club	Season	League			Cup		EFL Cup		Other		Total	
Club	Season	Division	Apps	Goals	Apps	Goals	Apps	Goals	Apps	Goals	Apps	Goals
Newcastle United	2014–15	Premier League	0	0	0	0	0	0	0	0	0	0
Port Vale (loan)	2014–15	League One	2	0	1	0	—		—		3	0
Rangers (loan)	2014–15	Scottish Championship	0	0	1	0	—		0	0	1	0
Port Vale	2015–16	League One	13	0	2	0	1	0	2 (Note: Appearance(s) in the Football League Trophy / EFL Trophy.)	0	18	0
Port Vale	2016–17	EFL League One	37	5	3	1	0	0	2	0	42	6
Port Vale	Total		50	5	5	1	1	0	4	0	60	6
Career total			52	5	7	1	1	0	4	0	64	6
