= Floyd Streete =

English footballer

Personal information
- Full name: Floyd Anthony Streete
- Date of birth: 5 May 1959 (age 67)
- Place of birth: Jamaica
- Height: 1.81 m (5 ft 11 1/2 in)
- Position: Central defender

Senior career*
Years	Team	Apps	(Gls)
1976–1983	Cambridge United	125	(19)
1983	Utrecht	8	(0)
1983–1984	Cambuur	19	(3)
1984–1986	Derby County	35	(0)
1986–1990	Wolverhampton Wanderers	159	(6)
1990–1992	Reading	38	(0)
1992–1993	Leighton Town		
Total		384	(28)
- * Club domestic league appearances and goals

Floyd Anthony Streete (born 5 May 1959) is an English former professional footballer who played as a central defender.

== Career ==
Streete played in the Football League for Cambridge United, Derby County, Wolverhampton Wanderers and Reading, making a total of 357 appearances for all four clubs. Streete also played in the Netherlands for Utrecht and Cambuur, before finishing his career in non-league football for Leighton Town.

He is perhaps best remembered for his career at Wolves, joining the Black Country club from Derby County in October 1985 for £5,000. Derby would win promotion from the Third Division that season while Wolves suffered relegation, but he played a key role in their turnaround in fortunes which followed over the next few years. He helped them win successive promotions as Fourth Division champions in 1988 and Third Division champions a year later, also winning the Football League Trophy in the first promotion season. He helped Wolves achieve a top half finish in the Second Division for the 1989–90 season before dropping down a division and signing for Reading in July 1990.

== After football ==
After retiring as a player Streete worked as a PE teacher, before moving to the Cayman Islands to open a gymnasium and teach football.

== Personal life ==
His son Remie Streete was also a professional footballer who played for Port Vale. Another son Cameron played for Swedish club Djurgården and now plays for Landskrona.

== Honours ==
Wolverhampton Wanderers

- Football League Third Division: 1988–89
- Football League Fourth Division: 1987–88
- Associate Members' Cup: 1987–88
