= Douglas Park (businessman) =

Scottish businessman (b.1950) associated with Rangers Football Club

- Born: 23 June 1950 (age 76); Scotland
- Occupation: Coach hire

Douglas Ireland Park (born 23 June 1950) is a Scottish businessman. He was the chairman of Rangers Football Club before stepping down in April 2023. He is still a director of the club.

== Business career ==
Park is the founder of Park's Motor Group, one of the largest privately owned motor dealership groups in Scotland. Park founded the company in 1971, aged 21.

== Football career ==
=== Heart of Midlothian ===
Park bought a £75,000 share in Heart of Midlothian Football Club in 1982 after a chance meeting with the clubs then chairman Wallace Mercer at the 1982 FIFA World Cup. He increased his stake to be the second largest shareholder and was briefly appointed a director on the board in 1988. Park quit the club in November 1988 after assistant manager Sandy Jardine was sacked and sold his shareholding shortly thereafter.

=== Rangers ===
Park was one of the so-called Three Bears who, along with fellow fans George Taylor and George Letham, purchased a 19.5 per cent stake in Rangers Football Club in January 2015. He became director of the club for the first time on 6 March 2015, during an AGM takeover led by Dave King. Park resigned after just five months on 4 August to concentrate on business commitments and his son, Graeme, replaced him as a director. Park rejoined the board later the same year on 16 November and was elected to the position of deputy chairman on 12 April 2018. He became chairman after the departure of King on 27 March 2020, initially on an interim basis, before taking the position permanently. He stepped down on 4 April 2023 after three years in the role.
