= Paul Murray (businessman) =

Scottish businessman

- Born: 29 May 1964 (age 62); Scotland
- Occupation: Outsourcing

Paul Murray (born 29 May 1964) is a Scottish businessman. He is a former director of Rangers Football Club.

Murray is a chartered accountant.

He became director of Rangers Football Club on 20 September 2007. A few weeks after Craig Whyte's take over the company that owned the club in May 2011, Murray was removed from the board by Whyte as for refusing to resign his directorship. After two years, Murray returned to the spotlight when he led a group of Rangers shareholders that requisitioned an EGM to vote on the removal of Plc board directors including then chief executive Craig Mather, although the bid proved ultimately unsuccessful. Not to be deterred, Murray played a role in Dave King's consortium's boardroom takeover at Ibrox Stadium in March 2015, taking on the role of interim chairman for King. He stepped down as chair on 22 May 2015 after King's appointment was approved by the football authorities. Murray later resigned from the Rangers board on 2 May 2018.
