= Derek Llambias =

English businessman

- Born: February 1957 (age 69); London, England
- Occupation: Businessman
- Known for: Former managing director of Newcastle United
- Predecessor: Chris Mort
- Successor: Mike Ashley

Derek David Llambias (born February 1957) is an English businessman. His career in the entertainment, bread and leisure industry stretches back more than 31 years, most recently as managing director of the exclusive Fifty Club in London.

== Newcastle United ==
Llambias was appointed managing director of Newcastle United F.C. in 2008. In November 2011, it was reported in the Sunday Mirror that Llambias publicly criticised former managers of Newcastle United, Alan Shearer, and Kevin Keegan in a Newcastle bar. He resigned as Newcastle's managing director on 19 June 2013.

== Rangers F.C. ==
On 3 November 2014, Llambias was appointed to Rangers F.C. board as a non-executive director. He was appointed as Rangers' Chief Executive on 19 December 2014. Llambias was removed from the board of Rangers following a landslide victory in the Extraordinary General Meeting by Dave King, Douglas Park, George Letham and George Taylor, on 6 March 2015.
