= Nominated adviser =

A nominated adviser (NOMAD) is a firm or company which has been approved by the London Stock Exchange (LSE) as a nominated adviser for the Alternative Investment Market (AIM) and whose name has been placed on the register of nominated advisers published by the London Stock Exchange.

The NOMAD project manages the admission of new issues to AIM and also acts as the effective regulator. Typically the NOMAD is a firm of investment bankers with experience of bringing companies to the market.

The NOMAD performs this regulator role under licence from the LSE. This unique situation arises largely because the AIM is an exchange regulated market.
