= Ryan Sinnamon =

Scottish footballer

Personal information
- Date of birth: 22 July 1996 (age 30)
- Place of birth: Greenock, Scotland
- Height: 1.74 m (5 ft 9 in)
- Positions: Midfielder; right-back

Youth career
- 2009–2015: Rangers

Senior career*
Years	Team	Apps	(Gls)
2014–2016	Rangers	0	(0)
2015	→ Falkirk (loan)	14	(1)
2016	→ Annan Athletic (loan)	20	(0)
2016-2017	Elgin City	21	(0)
2017–2019	Annan Athletic	33	(4)
2019–2020	East Kilbride	25	(1)
2021	Annan Athletic	7	(0)
2021–2022	Broomhill		
2022–2023	Pollok	4	(0)
2023	Auchinleck Talbot	0	(0)
2023–2024	Glenafton Athletic		

International career
2011–2012	Scotland U16	7	(0)
2012	Scotland U17	6	(1)
2013	Scotland U18	1	(0)
2013–2015	Scotland U19	12	(0)
- * Club domestic league appearances and goals as of 11:05, 13 July 2019 (UTC)

Ryan Sinnamon (born 22 July 1996) is a Scottish footballer.

== Club career ==
Sinnamon started his career at Rangers, playing for the Under-20 side. In June 2015, he signed a contract extension with Rangers and two months later joined Falkirk on loan for six months. Whilst with the Bairns, Sinnamon made his Falkirk, and senior professional debut, in a Scottish Championship match against Dumbarton on 24 October 2015. However, he did not feature for Falkirk again due to injury and returned to Rangers in January 2016.

In September 2016, Sinnamon joined Scottish League Two side Annan Athletic on loan until January 2017. On 11 January 2017 he was released by Rangers without making a single appearance for the Glasgow club, and was subsequently signed by Scottish League Two side Elgin City. In July 2017, Sinnamon returned to Galabank to sign for Annan Athletic on a permanent contract. After a season with East Kilbride, Sinnamon rejoined Annan in March 2021.

Sinnamon signed a precontract with Lowland League club Broomhill in May 2021.

After a year with Broomhill, Sinnamon signed for Pollok in the West of Scotland Football League in July 2022. He left the club by mutual consent in February 2023 and therefore has joined Auchinleck Talbot.

== International career ==
Sinnamon was capped by the Scotland national under-19 football team making thirteen appearances, his final match coming in 2015.

== Career statistics ==
As of match played 28 October 2017

Appearances and goals by club, season and competition
Club	Season	League			Scottish Cup		League Cup		Other		Total	
Club	Season	Division	Apps	Goals	Apps	Goals	Apps	Goals	Apps	Goals	Apps	Goals
Falkirk (loan)	2015–16	Championship	3	0	1	0	0	0	0	0	4	0
Annan Athletic (loan)	2016–17	League Two	9	0	3	0	0	0	0	0	12	0
Elgin City	2016–17	League Two	3	0	0	0	0	0	0	0	3	0
Annan Athletic	2017–18	League Two	10	1	1	0	4	1	1 (Note: Appearance in the Scottish Challenge Cup)	0	16	2
Career total			25	1	5	0	4	1	1	0	35	2
