= Kenny McDowall =

Scottish footballer and coach

Personal information
- Date of birth: 29 July 1963 (age 63)
- Place of birth: Glasgow, Scotland
- Positions: Forward; midfielder

Youth career
- Drumchapel Amateurs
- 1980–1981: Partick Thistle

Senior career*
Years	Team	Apps	(Gls)
1981–1984	Partick Thistle	67	(19)
1984–1993	St Mirren	178	(19)
Total		245	(38)

Managerial career
- 2014–2015: Rangers (caretaker)
- * Club domestic league appearances and goals

Kenneth McDowall (born 29 July 1963) is a Scottish football coach and former player.

== Playing career ==
During his playing career, McDowall played for Partick Thistle and St Mirren; he was top scorer for formative club Partick in 1983–84 when playing as a striker after replacing his friend Mo Johnston who had left the Jags for England a year earlier, and after transferring to St Mirren soon afterwards (involving a £30,000 cash-plus-player deal involving Alan Logan) he featured in the 1987 Scottish Cup Final as the Buddies defeated Dundee United 1–0. Later converting to a midfielder (and deputising in an emergency for injured goalkeeper Campbell Money), he made a total of 291 appearances for St Mirren before retiring due to injury in 1993, and was rewarded with a testimonial in 1996 after twelve years service at the Paisley club, including the last three as coach and assistant manager.

== Coaching career ==
After his playing career, he went into coaching and was appointed youth and reserve coach at Celtic in 1997.

After ten years at Celtic, McDowall switched to Glasgow rivals Rangers, working alongside manager Walter Smith and assistant manager Ally McCoist. At the end of the 2010–11 season and with Smith's departure, McDowall went from being first team coach to assistant manager under McCoist. After McCoist was placed on gardening leave on 21 December 2014, McDowall was given control of the first team until the end of the 2014–15 season. His first game in charge of Rangers was a 4–0 defeat against Hibernian at Easter Road. On 19 January, McDowall stated his intention to resign. Rangers said that he would work a 12-month notice period before leaving the club. McDowall left Rangers in March 2015, soon after a new board of directors had taken control.

== Managerial statistics ==
As of 12 March 2015

Team	Nat	From	To	Record				
Team	Nat	From	To	G	W	D	L	Win %
Rangers (caretaker)	(Scotland)	December 2014	March 2015	10	3	3	4	30.00
