= Dave King (businessman) =

British businessman (born 1955)

- Born: 3 August 1955 (age 71); Ayr, Scotland
- Occupation: Outsourcing

David Cunningham King (born 3 August 1955) is a Scottish-born, South African based former chairman of Rangers Football Club.

== Early life ==
King, one of seven children, was born and brought up in the Castlemilk area of Glasgow. He attended Allan Glen's School in the city after passing a bursary examination. He worked at Weir's Pumps in the nearby Cathcart area, before he was transferred to its South African operation in 1976.

== Business career ==
Following the transfer to South Africa by his employer, King took on several business roles and accumulated substantial personal wealth. The extent of King's wealth remains undisclosed but was sufficient for him to be included in a South African 'Rich List' in 2012. He was a financial adviser to many South African public institutions including the South African Post Office and the South African Reserve Bank in his early stages before establishing a financial risk management company, Specialised Outsourcing, that won a contract to manage the treasury operations of Umgeni Water.

On 14 June 2002 BBC News referred to South African reports that King faced eleven counts of tax related offences when he appeared at the Regional Court in Randburg, near Johannesburg. It was alleged that he owed the tax authorities over 900 million rand: approximately £60m but King strenuously denied this and successfully fought the tax authorities in court in what became SA's longest running tax dispute . King's tax problems began after one of his trust owned property companies bought an Irma Stern painting at an auction for R1.7 million in 2000. This attracted the attention of Charles Chipps, special investigator at the South African Revenue Service, SARS, who investigated King's personal tax returns to do a lifestyle audit. Chipps established that King's declared taxable income was insufficient to support his lifestyle but as King stated in subsequent legal proceedings, Chipps was looking at his personal tax returns and not those of the company that purchased the art work. The company that purchased the art work was up to date with its tax affairs. A massive tax dispute arose around what were King's personal tax obligations versus the tax obligations of his family trust companies.

After a decade of legal process, including an initially agreed, but subsequently vetoed, settlement, King and his family trust structures eventually reached a joint settlement with the tax authority which incorporated an agreement by King to plead guilty to routine statutory charges and agreeing to pay a fine for these statutory offences. King subsequently explained that he agreed to plead to the lesser statutory offences as they were not serious enough to restrict him from serving as a director of companies or in securing visa for international travel to the USA King was represented by Barry Roux, the lawyer who would later become well known for his defence of Oscar Pistorius.

=== Shareholding in Rangers Football Club ===
King joined the board of directors of Rangers Football Club as a non-executive director on 30 March 2000. He then invested £20 million of his personal wealth into Murray Sports Ltd. The football club entered administration on 14 February 2012. On 22 February 2012 King had a meeting with the club's administrators along with manager Ally McCoist.

On 7 June 2012 King called for the rejection of the proposed Company Voluntary Arrangement (CVA) to bring Rangers out of administration. The proposal was subsequently turned down by the club's largest creditor, HM Revenue and Customs, and Rangers FC entered Liquidation.

Despite the loss of his £20 million investment because of the club's financial collapse, King had indicated a willingness to invest in Rangers again. On 2 January 2015, King acquired almost 15% of shares in Rangers International Football Club, the owner of Rangers FC, from two separate shareholders. This came just two days after a trio of Scottish businessmen, known as the Three Bears, bought a large percentage of shares from the Laxey Partners. Both King and the Three Bears announced that they would work together to try and steer the club out of financial trouble. King's purchase made him the largest sole shareholder of the club.

King used his shareholding to convene an Extraordinary General Meeting of the Company on 6 March 2015. Despite opposition from Mike Ashley and the Easdale brothers King was able to have the existing board removed. Shareholders approved the appointment of King as non-executive chairman, Paul Murray as interim chairman and non-executive director and John Gilligan as a non-executive director of Rangers International Football Club plc, with immediate effect. King indicated prior to the meeting that he would not take up the appointment immediately as he first had to pass the "fit and proper" test that the Scottish Football Association (SFA) applied to the chairman of any football club in Scotland. The SFA investigated King's tax settlement arrangements as part of its fit and proper investigation and concluded in May 2015 by way of public announcement that King had passed its fit and proper test. King was consequently appointed Rangers chairman on 22 May 2015. Shareholders voted Chief executive officer Derek Llambias and Finance director Barry Leach off the board.

King stepped down as chairman in March 2020 with Douglas Park replacing him King announced in December 2020 he was selling his stake in the club to the fan group Club 1872 however the offer was withdrawn in February 2023 after the fan group failed to raise enough money. In 2025 King sold all his shares in Rangers to a US consortium of investors who completed a takeover of the club.

== Personal life ==
King is married to Ladina Jean Wylde King with whom he has four children.

King is close friends with South African golfer Gary Player and caddied for him at his last ten Masters in Augusta. They had a bitter legal dispute about a $1 million transaction that was settled in 2013 and King remains a close confidant and advisor to Player. King presently splits his time between his homes in South Africa and his wine farm in Tuscany after losing both his wine farms in South Africa to SARS in his tax battle with the South African Revenue Services.

In June 2026, U.S. president Donald Trump reposted on Truth Social a document he attributed to "Presidential Historian Dave King". The document argued that Trump's global reach made him more powerful than historical figures including Alexander the Great, Genghis Khan, Napoleon Bonaparte, Mao Zedong, Joseph Stalin and Adolf Hitler. The Guardian and Axios identified the author as King, reporting that he had shared the assessment with Gary Player and later discussed it with Trump during a round of golf in Florida. President Trump reportedly cited these claims in the book, Regime Change, by New York Times reporters Maggie Haberman and Jonathan Swan.
