= 2017–18 Rangers F.C. season =

Rangers
2017–18 season
- Chairman: Dave King
- Manager: Pedro Caixinha (until 26 October); Graeme Murty (until 1 May); Jimmy Nicholl (until 31 May)
- Ground: Ibrox Stadium; Glasgow, Scotland (Capacity: 50,817)
- Scottish Premiership: 3rd
- Scottish Cup: Semi-finals
- League Cup: Semi-finals
- Europa League: First qualifying round
- Top goalscorer: League: Alfredo Morelos (14); All: Alfredo Morelos (18), Josh Windass (18)
- Average home league attendance: 49,207
Home colours	Away colours	Third colours

The 2017–18 season was the 138th season of competitive football by Rangers.

== Results & fixtures ==
Win Draw Loss Postponed

=== Pre-season and friendlies ===
15 June 2017 Friendly	Rangers	5 − 0	Coleraine	Auchenhowie
15:00	McConaghie 10' (o.g.); Waghorn 35'; Hardie 62'; Dodoo 65'; O'Halloran 80'	Report		Stadium: Rangers Training Centre
Note: The match was played behind closed doors.

19 June 2017 Friendly	Rangers	1 − 1	The New Saints	Auchenhowie
15:00	Saunders 47' (o.g.)	Report	Darlington 60'	Stadium: Rangers Training Centre
Note: The match was played behind closed doors.

22 June 2017 Friendly	Rangers	0 − 0	St Johnstone	Auchenhowie
15:00		Report		Stadium: Rangers Training Centre
Note: The match was played behind closed doors.

1 July 2017 Friendly	Rangers	3 − 0	Raith Rovers	Auchenhowie
15:00	Morelos; Hardie; Windass			Stadium: Rangers Training Centre
Note: The match was played behind closed doors.

10 July 2017 Friendly	Rangers	2 − 1	Kilmarnock	Auchenhowie
15:00	Miller; Windass	Report	Boyd	Stadium: Rangers Training Centre
Note: The match was played behind closed doors.

18 July 2017 Friendly	Rangers	0 − 1	St Johnstone	Auchenhowie
14:30	Kranjčar (red card)		Hendry 80'	Stadium: Rangers Training Centre
Note: The match was played behind closed doors.

22 July 2017 Friendly	Rangers	1 − 1	Marseille	Glasgow
15:00	Kranjcar 75'	Report	Germain 63'	Stadium: Ibrox Stadium; Attendance: 22,107

26 July 2017 Friendly	Watford	1 − 2	Rangers	London Colney
17:00	Okaka 59'	Watford Report; Rangers Report	Candeias 42'; Waghorn 88'	Stadium: UCL Sports Ground

30 July 2017 Friendly	Sheffield Wednesday	0 − 2	Rangers	Sheffield
15:00		SWFC Report; Rangers Report	Windass 43'; Miller 55'	Stadium: Hillsborough Stadium; Attendance: 20,739

7 October 2017 Friendly	Rangers	3 − 3	Greenock Morton	Auchenhowie
12:00	Dálcio; Holt; Miller			Stadium: Rangers Training Centre
Note: The match was played behind closed doors.

11 January 2018 Florida Cup	Atlético Mineiro	0 – 1	Rangers	Orlando, United States
19:00 UTC−05:00		Rangers Report	Windass 68'	Stadium: Orlando City Stadium; Referee: Andrew Musashe

13 January 2018 Florida Cup	Rangers	4 – 2	Corinthians	Orlando, United States
16:00 UTC−05:00	Morelos 62', 76'; Halliday 70'; Tavernier 81'	Rangers Report	Rodriguinho 30'; Kazim-Richards 39'	Stadium: Spectrum Stadium; Referee: Jonathan Bilinski

=== Scottish Premiership ===
6 August 2017 1	Motherwell	1 – 2	Rangers	Motherwell
13:30	Heneghan 40'	Rangers Report; BBC Report; SPFL Report	Dorrans 4', 58' (pen.)	Stadium: Fir Park; Attendance: 9,974; Referee: Bobby Madden

12 August 2017 2	Rangers	2 – 3	Hibernian	Glasgow
15:00	Morelos 3'; Tavernier 81'	Rangers Report; BBC Report; SPFL Report	S. Murray 21'; Tavernier 39' (o.g.); Slivka 65'	Stadium: Ibrox Stadium; Attendance: 49,636; Referee: John Beaton

19 August 2017 3	Rangers	0 – 0	Heart of Midlothian	Glasgow
15:00		Rangers Report; BBC Report; SPFL Report		Stadium: Ibrox Stadium; Attendance: 49,677; Referee: Willie Collum

27 August 2017 4	Ross County	1 – 3	Rangers	Dingwall
15:00	Mikkelsen 59'	Rangers Report; BBC Report; SPFL Report	Morelos 31', 41'; Herrera 89'	Stadium: Victoria Park; Attendance: 6,400; Referee: Craig Thomson

9 September 2017 5	Rangers	4 – 1	Dundee	Glasgow
15:00	Morelos 41', 85'; Windass 68'; Peña 83'	Rangers Report; BBC Report; SPFL Report	El Bakhtaoui 90+1'	Stadium: Ibrox Stadium; Attendance: 49,164; Referee: Andrew Dallas

15 September 2017 6	Partick Thistle	2 – 2	Rangers	Glasgow
19:45	Spittal 50'; Erskine 60'	Rangers Report; BBC Report; SPFL Report	Morelos 19'; Dorrans 77'	Stadium: Firhill Stadium; Attendance: 8,264; Referee: Willie Collum

23 September 2017 7	Rangers	0 – 2	Celtic	Glasgow
12:00		Rangers Report; BBC Report; SPFL Report	Rogic 50'; Griffiths 65'	Stadium: Ibrox Stadium; Attendance: 50,116; Referee: Craig Thomson

29 September 2017 8	Hamilton Academical	1 – 4	Rangers	Hamilton
19:45	Redmond 1'	Rangers Report; BBC Report; SPFL Report	John 21', 25'; Candeias 27'; Dorrans 59' (pen.)	Stadium: New Douglas Park; Attendance: 5,400; Referee: Andrew Dallas

13 October 2017 9	St Johnstone	0 – 3	Rangers	Perth
19:45	Anderson (red card) 71'	Rangers Report; BBC Report; SPFL Report	Peña 27', 78'; Dorrans 86'	Stadium: McDiarmid Park; Attendance: 6,887; Referee: Don Robertson

25 October 2017 11	Rangers	1 – 1	Kilmarnock	Glasgow
19:45	Holt 44'	Rangers Report; BBC Report; SPFL Report	Burke 90+5'	Stadium: Ibrox Stadium; Attendance: 47,981; Referee: Alan Muir

28 October 2017 12	Heart of Midlothian	1 – 3	Rangers	Edinburgh
12:30	Lafferty 24'	Rangers Report; BBC Report; SPFL Report	Miller 43', 65'; Windass 72'	Stadium: Murrayfield Stadium; Attendance: 32,852; Referee: Craig Thomson

4 November 2017 13	Rangers	3 – 0	Partick Thistle	Glasgow
15:00	McCrorie 30'; Candeias 39'; Windass 47'	Rangers Report; BBC Report; SPFL Report		Stadium: Ibrox Stadium; Attendance: 49,502; Referee: Willie Collum

18 November 2017 14	Rangers	0 – 2	Hamilton Academical	Glasgow
15:00		Rangers Report; BBC Report; SPFL Report	Templeton 47'; Lyon 81'	Stadium: Ibrox Stadium; Attendance: 48,892; Referee: Greg Aitken

24 November 2017 15	Dundee	2 – 1	Rangers	Dundee
19:45	O'Hara 66', 80'	Rangers Report; BBC Report; SPFL Report	Windass 70'	Stadium: Dens Park; Attendance: 8,548; Referee: Kevin Clancy

29 November 2017 10	Rangers	3 – 0	Aberdeen	Glasgow
19:45	Tavernier 7' (pen.), 70'; Peña 27'	Rangers Report; BBC Report; SPFL Report		Stadium: Ibrox Stadium; Attendance: 48,687; Referee: Andrew Dallas

3 December 2017 16	Aberdeen	1 – 2	Rangers	Aberdeen
12:30	Ross 65'	Rangers Report; BBC Report; SPFL Report	Wilson 14'; Windass 63'	Stadium: Pittodrie Stadium; Attendance: 18,983; Referee: Willie Collum

9 December 2017 17	Rangers	2 – 1	Ross County	Glasgow
15:00	Morelos 59'; Wilson 83'	Rangers Report; BBC Report; SPFL Report	Curran 10'	Stadium: Ibrox Stadium; Attendance: 48,139; Referee: Euan Anderson

13 December 2017 18	Hibernian	1 – 2	Rangers	Edinburgh
19:45	Stevenson 9'	Rangers Report; BBC Report; SPFL Report	Windass 42'; Morelos 45'	Stadium: Easter Road; Attendance: 20,057; Referee: Kevin Clancy

16 December 2017 19	Rangers	1 – 3	St Johnstone	Glasgow
15:00	Morelos 5'	Rangers Report; BBC Report; SPFL Report	Alston 10'; Johnstone 61'; Cummins 71'	Stadium: Ibrox Stadium; Attendance: 47,923; Referee: Don Robertson

23 December 2017 20	Kilmarnock	2 – 1	Rangers	Kilmarnock
12:30	Boyd 77', 80'	Rangers Report; BBC Report; SPFL Report	John 39'	Stadium: Rugby Park; Attendance: 11,490; Referee: Willie Collum

27 December 2017 21	Rangers	2 – 0	Motherwell	Glasgow
19:45	Wilson 56'; Morelos 76'	Rangers Report; BBC Report; SPFL Report		Stadium: Ibrox Stadium; Attendance: 49,273; Referee: John Beaton

30 December 2017 22	Celtic	0 – 0	Rangers	Glasgow
12:00		Rangers Report; BBC Report; SPFL Report		Stadium: Celtic Park; Attendance: 59,004; Referee: Bobby Madden

24 January 2018 23	Rangers	2 – 0	Aberdeen	Glasgow
19:45	Morelos 32'; Tavernier 80' (pen.)	Rangers Report; BBC Report; SPFL Report		Stadium: Ibrox Stadium; Attendance: 49,707; Referee: Bobby Madden

28 January 2018 24	Ross County	1 – 2	Rangers	Dingwall
14:00	Ngog 90' (pen.)	Rangers Report; BBC Report; SPFL Report	Candeias 21'; Cummings 82'	Stadium: Victoria Park, Dingwall; Attendance: 6,541; Referee: Steven McLean

3 February 2018 26	Rangers	1 – 2	Hibernian	Glasgow
15:00	Goss 73'	Rangers Report; BBC Report; BBC Report	McGinn 41'; MacLaren 75' (pen.)	Stadium: Ibrox Stadium; Attendance: 49,986; Referee: Willie Collum

6 February 2018 25	Partick Thistle	0 – 2	Rangers	Glasgow
19:45		Rangers Report; BBC Report; SPFL Report	Windass 39'; Tavernier 58'	Stadium: Firhill Stadium; Attendance: 7,332; Referee: Alan Muir

17 February 2018 27	Hamilton Academical	3 – 5	Rangers	Hamilton
14:15	Lyon 5'; Templeton 22'; Imrie 88' (pen.)	Rangers Report; BBC Sport; SPFL Report	Murphy 10'; Windass 19', 34', 72'; Morelos 27'	Stadium: New Douglas Park; Attendance: 5,406; Referee: Bobby Madden

24 February 2018 28	Rangers	2 – 0	Heart of Midlothian	Glasgow
15:00	Murphy 41'; Martin 88'	Rangers Report; BBC Report; SPFL Report		Stadium: Ibrox Stadium; Attendance: 49,927; Referee: John Beaton

27 February 2018 29	St Johnstone	1 – 4	Rangers	Perth
19:45	Kerr 62'	Rangers Report; BBC Report; SPFL Report	Tavernier 12' (pen.); Windass 25'; Goss 40'; Morelos 56'	Stadium: McDiarmid Park; Attendance: 5,737; Referee: Steven McLean

11 March 2018 30	Rangers	2 – 3	Celtic	Glasgow
12:00	Windass 3'; Candeias 26'	Rangers Report; BBC Sport; SPFL Report	Rogic 11'; Dembélé 45+1'; Édouard 69'	Stadium: Ibrox Stadium; Attendance: 50,215; Referee: Willie Collum

17 March 2018 31	Rangers	0 – 1	Kilmarnock	Glasgow
15:00		Rangers Report; BBC Sport; SPFL Report	Boyd 54'	Stadium: Ibrox Stadium; Attendance: 49,396; Referee: Don Robertson

31 March 2018 32	Motherwell	2 – 2	Rangers	Motherwell
12:30	Main 8' (pen.); Campbell 15'	Rangers Report; BBC Report; SPFL Report	Tavernier 51' (pen.); Murphy 55'	Stadium: Fir Park; Attendance: 8,915; Referee: Nick Walsh

7 April 2018 33	Rangers	4 – 0	Dundee	Glasgow
15:00	Miller 39'; Morelos 68'; Murphy 79'; Candeias 90'	Rangers Report; BBC Report; SPFL Report		Stadium: Ibrox Stadium; Attendance: 49,142; Referee: Greg Aitken

22 April 2018 34	Rangers	2 – 1	Heart of Midlothian	Glasgow
12:30	Cummings 47'; Candeias 64'	BBC Report; Rangers Report; SPFL Report	Berra 71'	Stadium: Ibrox Stadium; Attendance: 47,272; Referee: Craig Thomson

29 April 2018 35	Celtic	5 – 0	Rangers	Glasgow
12:00	Édouard 14', 41'; Forrest 45'; Rogic 46'; McGregor 53'	Rangers Report; BBC Report; SPFL Report		Stadium: Celtic Park; Attendance: 58,320; Referee: Craig Thomson

5 May 2018 36	Rangers	1 – 0	Kilmarnock	Glasgow
15:00	Bates 85'	Rangers Report; BBC Report; SPFL Report		Stadium: Ibrox Stadium; Attendance: 49,703; Referee: Alan Muir

8 May 2018 37	Aberdeen	1 – 1	Rangers	Aberdeen
19:45	McLean 14' (pen.)	Rangers Report; BBC Report; SPFL Report	McCrorie 63'	Stadium: Pittodrie Stadium; Attendance: 17,745; Referee: Steven McLean

13 May 2018 38	Hibernian	5 – 5	Rangers	Edinburgh
12:30	Kamberi 10' (pen.); Allan 19'; Maclaren 22', 70', 90+3'	Rangers Report; BBC Sport; SPFL Report	Tavernier 25'; Rossiter 27'; Alves 40'; Holt 54'; Windass 68'	Stadium: Easter Road; Attendance: 19,579; Referee: Andrew Dallas

=== League Cup ===
9 August 2017 Second round	Rangers	6 – 0	Dunfermline Athletic	Glasgow
19:45	Miller 5'; Alves 9'; Morelos 23', 75'; Tavernier 27'; Candeias 57'	Rangers Report; BBC Report; SPFL Report		Stadium: Ibrox Stadium; Attendance: 35,262; Referee: Don Robertson

19 September 2017 Quarter-finals	Partick Thistle	1 – 3 (a.e.t.)	Rangers	Glasgow
19:45	Doolan 90+1'	Rangers Report; BBC Report; SPFL Report	Peña 55'; Candeias 94'; Herrera 99'	Stadium: Firhill Stadium; Attendance: 7,394; Referee: Steven McLean

22 October 2017 Semi-finals	Rangers	0 – 2	Motherwell	Glasgow
14:30		Rangers Report; BBC Report; SPFL Report	Moult 52', 74'	Stadium: Hampden Park; Attendance: 44,506; Referee: Steven McLean

=== Scottish Cup ===
31 January 2018 Fourth round	Fraserburgh	0 – 3	Rangers	Fraserburgh
19:30		Rangers Report; BBC Report	Windass 15' (pen.), 55', 67'	Stadium: Bellslea Park; Attendance: 1,865; Referee: Greg Aitken

11 February 2018 Fifth round	Ayr United	1 – 6	Rangers	Ayr
14:30	Forrest 11'	Rangers Report; BBC Report	Morelos 31', 72'; Cummings 66'; Windass 69', 81'; Murphy 88'	Stadium: Somerset Park; Attendance: 9,346; Referee: Nick Walsh

4 March 2018 Quarter-finals	Rangers	4 – 1	Falkirk	Glasgow
16:15	Cummings 16', 44', 75'; Muirhead 21' (o.g.)	Rangers Report; BBC Report	Muirhead 20'	Stadium: Ibrox Stadium; Attendance: 33,968; Referee: Craig Thomson

15 April 2018 Semi-finals	Celtic	4 – 0	Rangers	Glasgow
14:30	Rogic 22'; McGregor 38'; Dembélé 52' (pen.); Ntcham 78' (pen.)	Rangers Report; BBC Report		Stadium: Hampden Park; Attendance: 49,729; Referee: Bobby Madden

=== Europa League ===
29 June 2017 1QR 1st leg	Rangers (Scotland)	1 − 0	(Luxembourg) Progrès Niederkorn	Glasgow, Scotland
19:45 BST	Miller 37'	BBC Report; Rangers Report; UEFA Report		Stadium: Ibrox Stadium; Attendance: 48,681; Referee: Mohammed Al-Hakim (Sweden)

4 July 2017 1QR 2nd leg	Progrès Niederkorn (Luxembourg)	2 − 0 (2−1 agg.)	(Scotland) Rangers	Luxembourg City, Luxembourg
18:45 BST	Françoise 66'; S. Thill 75'	BBC Report; Rangers Report; UEFA report		Stadium: Stade Josy Barthel (Note: Progrès Niederkorn played their home match at Stade Josy Barthel, Luxembourg City, instead of their regular stadium Stade Jos Haupert, Niederkorn.); Attendance: 5,534; Referee: Vilhjálmur Alvar Þórarinsson (Iceland)

== Squad statistics ==
The table below includes all players registered with the SPFL as part of the Rangers squad for 2017–18 season. They may not have made an appearance.

=== Appearances, goals and discipline ===
No.	Pos.	Nat.	Name	Totals		Scottish Premiership		Scottish Cup		League Cup		Europa League		Discipline	
No.	Pos.	Nat.	Name	Apps	Goals	Apps	Goals	Apps	Goals	Apps	Goals	Apps	Goals	Yellow card	Red card
1	GK	(England) ENG	Wes Foderingham	37	0	33+0	0	2+0	0	0	0	2	0	1	0
2	DF	(England) ENG	James Tavernier	46	9	37+1	8	3+0	0	3	1	2	0	5	0
3	DF	(Wales) WAL	Declan John	31	3	25+1	3	3+0	0	2	0	0	0	2	0
4	DF	(Portugal) POR	Fábio Cardoso	18	0	9+3	0	1+0	0	3	0	2	0	2	0
5	DF	(Scotland) SCO	Lee Wallace	7	0	5+0	0	0+0	0	0	0	2	0	0	0
7	FW	(Portugal) POR	Dálcio	3	0	0+1	0	0+0	0	0	0	1+1	0	0	0
8	MF	(Scotland) SCO	Ryan Jack	21	0	17+0	0	0+0	0	2	0	2	0	2	4
9	FW	(Scotland) SCO	Kenny Miller	23	5	15+3	3	0+2	0	1	1	2	1	0	0
10	MF	(Scotland) SCO	Graham Dorrans	20	5	16+0	5	1+0	0	3	0	0	0	6	0
11	MF	(England) ENG	Josh Windass	41	18	31+2	13	3+1	5	3	0	0+1	0	7	0
14	FW	(Ghana) GHA	Joe Dodoo	2	0	0+0	0	0+2	0	0+0	0	0+0	0	0	0
15	FW	(Mexico) MEX	Eduardo Herrera	24	2	2+17	1	0+2	0	0+2	1	0+1	0	2	0
16	MF	(Scotland) SCO	Andy Halliday	15	0	5+6	0	3+1	0	0+0	0	0+0	0	3	0
17	DF	(Northern Ireland) NIR	Lee Hodson	9	0	5+1	0	1+0	0	1+1	0	0	0	1	0
18	MF	(England) ENG	Jordan Rossiter	5	1	1+1	1	0+0	0	1	0	1+1	0	2	0
20	FW	(Colombia) COL	Alfredo Morelos	43	18	29+6	14	3+0	2	3	2	1+1	0	11	0
21	MF	(Portugal) POR	Daniel Candeias	45	8	34+3	6	3+0	0	3	2	1+1	0	3	0
22	DF	(Portugal) POR	Bruno Alves	25	2	17+3	1	1+1	0	3	1	0	0	4	0
23	MF	(Scotland) SCO	Jason Holt	32	2	23+3	2	1+2	0	0+2	0	1	0	10	1
24	DF	(Scotland) SCO	David Bates	20	1	13+2	1	3+0	0	0	0	2	0	2	0
25	GK	(England) ENG	Jak Alnwick	10	0	5+0	0	2+0	0	3	0	0	0	0	0
26	FW	(Australia) AUS	Jason Cummings	18	6	6+9	2	3+0	4	0	0	0	0	4	0
27	MF	(Germany) GER	Sean Goss	15	2	10+3	2	2+0	0	0+0	0	0	0	3	0
28	FW	(Scotland) SCO	Jamie Murphy	19	5	16+0	4	2+1	1	0	0	0	0	0	0
29	FW	(Scotland) SCO	Michael O'Halloran	1	0	0+1	0	0	0	0	0	0	0	0	0
32	GK	(Scotland) SCO	Liam Kelly	0	0	0+0	0	0+0	0	0	0	0	0	0	0
33	DF	(Scotland) SCO	Russell Martin	17	1	15+0	1	2+0	0	0	0	0	0	1	0
35	MF	(Scotland) SCO	Jamie Barjonas	5	0	1+4	0	0+0	0	0	0	0	0	1	0
36	DF	(Malta) MLT	Myles Beerman	0	0	0+0	0	0+0	0	0	0	0	0	0	0
40	DF	(Scotland) SCO	Ross McCrorie	24	2	19+2	2	1+0	0	0+2	0	0	0	6	1
43	DF	(Scotland) SCO	Kyle Bradley	0	0	0	0	0	0	0	0	0	0	0	0
45	FW	(Finland) FIN	Serge Atakayi	0	0	0+0	0	0+0	0	0	0	0	0	0	0
48	MF	(Scotland) SCO	Greg Docherty	14	0	8+3	0	3	0	0	0	0	0	1	0
Players transferred or loaned out during the season
6	DF	(Scotland) SCO	Danny Wilson	15	3	12+2	3	0+0	0	0+1	0	0	0	3	0
19	MF	(Croatia) CRO	Niko Kranjčar	11	0	4+3	0	1+0	0	0+1	0	2	0	2	0
26	MF	(England) ENG	Harry Forrester	0	0	0	0	0	0	0	0	0	0	0	0
27	MF	(Mexico) MEX	Carlos Peña	14	5	6+6	4	0+0	0	2	1	0	0	1	0
28	MF	(France) FRA	Aaron Nemane	6	0	0+5	0	0+0	0	0+1	0	0	0	0	0
30	MF	(Northern Ireland) NIR	Jordan Thompson	0	0	0+0	0	0+0	0	0	0	0	0	0	0
31	FW	(Scotland) SCO	Ryan Hardie	7	0	0+7	0	0+0	0	0	0	0	0	0	0
33	FW	(England) ENG	Martyn Waghorn	1	0	0	0	0	0	0	0	1	0	0	0
34	DF	(Scotland) SCO	Aidan Wilson	0	0	0+0	0	0+0	0	0	0	0	0	0	0
42	MF	(Scotland) SCO	Liam Burt	0	0	0+0	0	0+0	0	0+0	0	0	0	0	0

- Last updated: 3 December 2017
- Ordered by Squad Number.

Appearances (starts and substitute appearances) and goals include those in Scottish Premiership, League Cup, Scottish Cup, and the UEFA Europa League.

== Club statistics ==
=== Competition overview ===
Competition	First match	Last match	Final position	Record								
Competition	First match	Last match	Final position	M	W	D	L	GF	GA	GD	Win %	Ref.
Scottish Premiership	5 August 2017	12 May 2018	3rd	38	21	7	10	76	50	+26	55.26	
Scottish League Cup	9 August 2017	22 October 2017	Semi-finals	3	2	0	1	9	3	+6	66.67	
Scottish Cup	20 January 2018	15 April 2018	Semi-finals	4	3	0	1	13	6	+7	75.00	
UEFA Europa League	29 June 2017	4 July 2017	First qualifying round	2	1	0	1	1	2	−1	50.00	
Total				47	27	7	13	99	61	+38	57.45	—

As of 16 April 2018

=== League table ===
Pos	Team	Pld	W	D	L	GF	GA	GD	Pts	Qualification or relegation (Note: Teams play each other three times (33 matches) before the league is split into two groups (the top six and the bottom six).)
1	Celtic (C)	38	24	10	4	73	25	+48	82	Qualification for the Champions League first qualifying round (Note: Since the winners of the 2017–18 Scottish Cup, Celtic, qualified for European competition based on league position, the spot awarded to the Scottish Cup winners (Europa League second qualifying round) was passed to the second-placed team and the spot awarded to the second-placed team (Europa League first qualifying round) was passed to the fourth-placed team.)
2	Aberdeen	38	22	7	9	56	37	+19	73	Qualification for the Europa League second qualifying round
3	Rangers	38	21	7	10	76	50	+26	70	Qualification for the Europa League first qualifying round
4	Hibernian	38	18	13	7	62	46	+16	67	Qualification for the Europa League first qualifying round
5	Kilmarnock	38	16	11	11	49	47	+2	59	

Source: Soccerway BBC
Rules for classification: 1) Points; 2) Goal difference; 3) Goals scored; 4) Play-off (only if deciding champion, UEFA competitions qualification and second-stage group allocation).
(C) Champions

== Club ==
=== Technical Staff ===
Name	Role
Manager/Caretaker Manager	(Portugal) Pedro Caixinha (until October 26, 2017) (Scotland) Graham Murty (October 26, 2017 until May 1, 2018) (Northern Ireland) Jimmy Nichol (May 1, 2018 until May 13, 2018)
First team coach	Jonatan Johansson
Interim goalkeeping coach	Colin Stewart
Director of football	Mark Allen (From 20 June)
Head of scouting	Andy Scoulding (From 30 October)
Club doctor	Paul Jackson
Head of performance and preparation	Craig Flannigan
Head of sport science	Luke Lawrence
Head of strength and conditioning	Paraskevas Polychronopolous
Physiotherapists	Stevie Walker; Alex MacQueen
Masseur	David Lavery
Head of analysis	Neil McIlhargey
Head of technical media	Steve Harvey
Kit executive	Jimmy Bell

== Transfers ==
=== Players in ===
Date	Player	From	Fee
31 May 2017	(Portugal) Bruno Alves	(Italy) Cagliari	Undisclosed
1 June 2017	(Scotland) Ryan Jack	(Scotland) Aberdeen	Free
7 June 2017	(Portugal) Fábio Cardoso	(Portugal) Vitória	£1,300,000
11 June 2017	(Portugal) Daniel Candeias	(Portugal) Benfica	£700,000
19 June 2017	(Colombia) Alfredo Morelos	(Finland) HJK Helsinki	£1,000,000
22 June 2017	(Mexico) Eduardo Herrera	(Mexico) Pumas UNAM	£1,500,000
22 June 2017	(Mexico) Carlos Peña	(Mexico) C.D. Guadalajara	£3,200,000
6 July 2017	(Scotland) Graham Dorrans	(England) Norwich City	£1,300,000
1 January 2018	(Wales) Declan John	(Wales) Cardiff City	Undisclosed
25 January 2018	(Scotland) Greg Docherty	(Scotland) Hamilton Academical	Undisclosed
31 January 2018	(Scotland) Glenn Middleton	(England) Norwich City	Undisclosed

=== Players out ===
Date	Player	To	Fee
10 May 2017	(Scotland) Billy Gilmour	(England) Chelsea	£500,000
1 June 2017	(England) Clint Hill	(England) Carlisle United	Free
1 June 2017	(Switzerland) Philippe Senderos	(United States) Houston Dynamo	Free
16 June 2017	(England) Joe Garner	(England) Ipswich Town	£1,000,000
5 July 2017	(Scotland) Barrie McKay	(England) Nottingham Forest	£500,000
18 July 2017	(England) Matt Crooks	(England) Northampton Town	Undisclosed
3 August 2017	(Republic of Ireland) Rob Kiernan	(England) Southend United	Undisclosed
7 August 2017	(England) Martyn Waghorn	(England) Ipswich Town	Undisclosed
29 January 2018	(Scotland) Danny Wilson	(United States) Colorado Rapids	Undisclosed
23 March 2018	(Croatia) Niko Kranjčar	Released	Released

=== Loans in ===
Start date	End date	Player	From	Fee
6 June 2017	1 June 2018	(Portugal) Dálcio	(Portugal) Benfica	Loan
23 August 2017	3 January 2018	(France) Aaron Nemane	(England) Manchester City	Loan
31 August 2017	1 January 2018	(Wales) Declan John	(Wales) Cardiff City	Loan
3 January 2018	1 June 2018	(Germany) Sean Goss	(England) Queens Park Rangers	Loan
7 January 2018	1 June 2018	(Scotland) Jamie Murphy	(England) Brighton & Hove Albion	Loan
15 January 2018	1 June 2018	(Australia) Jason Cummings	(England) Nottingham Forest	Loan
16 January 2018	1 June 2018	(Scotland) Russell Martin	(England) Norwich City	Loan

=== Loans out ===
Start date	End date	Player	To	Fee
28 June 2017	1 January 2018	(Scotland) Andy Halliday	(Azerbaijan) Gabala FK	Loan
29 July 2017	1 January 2018	(Scotland) Michael O'Halloran	(Scotland) St Johnstone	Loan
19 August 2017	1 June 2018	(England) Harry Forrester	(England) AFC Wimbledon	Loan
31 August 2017	1 January 2018	(Ghana) Joe Dodoo	(England) Charlton Athletic	Loan
4 January 2018	1 June 2018	(Malta) Myles Beerman	(Scotland) Queen of the South	Loan
5 January 2018	1 June 2018	(Northern Ireland) Jordan Thompson	(Scotland) Livingston	Loan
9 January 2018	9 January 2019	(Mexico) Carlos Peña	(Mexico) Cruz Azul	Loan
19 January 2018	31 May 2018	(Scotland) Ryan Hardie	(Scotland) Livingston	Loan
9 February 2018	31 May 2018	(Scotland) Aidan Wilson	(Scotland) Dumbarton	Loan
16 February 2018	31 May 2018	(Scotland) Liam Burt	(Scotland) Dumbarton	Loan
