= Progrès Niederkorn 2–0 Rangers =

- Event: 2017–18 UEFA Europa League first qualifying round – Second leg
Progrès Niederkorn	Rangers
(Luxembourg)	(Scotland)
2	0
- Progrès Niederkorn win 2–1 on aggregate
- Date: 4 July 2017
- Venue: Stade Josy Barthel, Luxembourg City
- Man of the Match: Olivier Thill
- Referee: Vilhjálmur Þórarinsson (Iceland)
- Attendance: 5,534

Progrès Niederkorn vs Rangers was a football match played on 4 July 2017 at the Stade Josy Barthel. The match was a UEFA Europa League first qualifying round tie between Luxembourgish minnows Progrès Niederkorn, who finished fourth in the 2016–17 National Division, and Scottish side Rangers, who finished third in the 2016–17 Scottish Premiership.

At the time, the Luxembourg National Division was among the lowest ranked football leagues in terms of their UEFA coefficient. In addition, Progrès had never before won a game in European competition and had scored only once in 13 European games. In contrast, Rangers have an established history in European competition; they won the 1971–72 European Cup Winners' Cup and finished runners up in the 1961 and 1967 finals of the same competition, they also finished as runners-up in the 2007–08 UEFA Cup.

The result, 2–0 to Progrès, is considered by some media outlets as "humiliating" for Rangers and was described as "the worst result in the club's history". It sent Rangers out of European competition for another year, having not qualified in the previous six years since the club's administration in 2012.

== Build-up ==
Led by Luxembourgish-Italian manager Paolo Amodio, Niederkorn finished fourth in the 2016–17 Luxembourg National Division and thus qualified for the first qualifying round of the UEFA Europa League. In 2006, Niederkorn were promoted from the Division of Honour to the Luxembourgish top flight, the club initially struggled and had to face the relegation playoffs in the 2012–13 season. However, they saw success in the subsequent years. They qualified for the 2015–16 Europa League for the first time since 1982 by finishing fourth but succumbed to a 3–0 defeat on aggregate to Shamrock Rovers in the first qualifying round. Niederkorn repeated that league success of the previous year in 2016–17 by finishing fourth which again placed them in the first qualifying round of the Europa League, this time they were drawn against Rangers.

On 13 March 2017, Rangers assigned Portuguese national Pedro Caixinha to the role of manager after the club finished third in the 2016–17 Scottish Premiership, which qualified them for the Europa League. The 2016–17 season was Rangers' first season back in the Scottish Premier League after being sent to the lowest tier of the Scottish football league system, the Third Division (now known as League Two), for the 2012–13 season as they entered into administration. The club had not qualified for European competition in six years.

On 29 June 2017, Rangers won the first leg of their tie against Progrès Niederkorn 1–0 at Ibrox and went into the game with high hopes.

== Match ==
"I'm just disappointed. I assume all the responsibility. We could not do what we were here to do – win the game. What happened to us today is a once-in-a-lifetime thing. That's part of football of course."

— Pedro Caixinha, speaking after the game.

Rangers' starting eleven contained Caixinha's new signings Daniel Candeias, Alfredo Morelos and Fábio Cardoso, and Ryan Jack also received his debut.

The visitors saw most of the ball in the early stages of the game but could not find a way past the Niederkorn defence. Rangers striker Kenny Miller, who scored the goal in the reverse leg, saw his shot blocked, and that was the closest to a goal for either side in the first half and they went in for the interval with the score remaining level on the night but the Scots ahead on aggregate.

The deadlock was almost broken by Rangers through a Niko Kranjčar header which came back off the crossbar, but it was Progrès that initiated the scoring. In the 66th minute, Rangers conceded a free kick in a threatening position. It proved decisive as Emmanuel Françoise headed in the opener and scored the club's first European goal since a 1–1 draw against Glentoran in 1981.

Progrès then doubled their lead on the night and took the lead on aggregate in the 75th minute from another free kick: Sébastien Thill curled in a free kick which evaded everyone and crept in at the far post.

Rangers failed to score a vital away goal which would send them through, despite hitting the bar twice, and Progrès secured their first win in European competition in their 100-year history.

=== Details ===
4 July 2017
18:45 UTC+2

Progrès Niederkorn (Luxembourg)	2–0	(Scotland) Rangers
Françoise 66'; S. Thill 75'	Report

Stade Josy Barthel, Luxembourg City
Attendance: 5,534
Referee: Vilhjálmur Þórorinsson (Iceland)

Progrès Niederkorn	Rangers

GK	1	(France) Sébastien Flauss	(substituted off) 33'
DF	23	(France) Adrien Ferino
DF	38	(Luxembourg) Metin Karayer
DF	70	(Luxembourg) Yann Matias
MF	10	(Luxembourg) Olivier Thill	(substituted off) 78'
MF	11	(Luxembourg) Mike Schneider
MF	16	(Germany) Maximilian Watzka
MF	31	(Luxembourg) Sébastien Thill (c)
MF	14	(France) Emmanuel Françoise
FW	25	(France) Alexis Lafon
FW	87	(Armenia) Aleksandre Karapetian	(substituted off) 84'
Substitutes:
GK	13	(Luxembourg) Charly Schinker	(substituted on) 33'
DF	5	(Luxembourg) Ben Vogel	(substituted on) 78'
DF	17	(Luxembourg) David Soares
DF	20	(Luxembourg) Tony Mastrangelo
DF	27	(Luxembourg) Alessandro Fiorani	(substituted on) 84'
MF	7	(Luxembourg) Ricky Borges
FW	9	(France) Théo Sully
Manager:
(Luxembourg) Paolo Amodio

GK	1	(England) Wes Foderingham
RB	2	(England) James Tavernier
CB	4	(Portugal) Fábio Cardoso
CB	24	(Scotland) David Bates
LB	5	(Scotland) Lee Wallace (c)
CM	18	(England) Jordan Rossiter	(substituted off) 77'
CM	8	(Scotland) Ryan Jack
RW	21	(Portugal) Daniel Candeias	(substituted off) 58'
AM	19	(Croatia) Niko Kranjčar
LW	9	(Scotland) Kenny Miller
CF	20	(Colombia) Alfredo Morelos	(substituted off) 45'
Substitutes:
GK	25	(England) Jak Alnwick
DF	40	(Scotland) Ross McCrorie
MF	7	(Portugal) Dálcio	(substituted on) 45'
MF	11	(England) Josh Windass	(substituted on) 58'
MF	23	(Scotland) Jason Holt
FW	15	(Mexico) Eduardo Herrera	(substituted on) 77'
FW	33	(England) Martyn Waghorn
Manager:
(Portugal) Pedro Caixinha

== Aftermath ==
=== Rangers ===
"For the Rangers fans it's humiliating. For the players, humbling, and when the dust settles on what some are calling the worst result in the club's history there will be huge questions to answer for the Rangers board and manager Pedro Caixinha."

— BBC Scotland senior football reporter Chris McLaughlin commenting after the match.

After the defeat, Scottish media outlets regarded the match as one of the most embarrassing defeats in the history of Rangers, the history of Scottish football, and one of the greatest shocks in European football. The BBC described the match as "humiliating" for Rangers, and the Daily Record dubbed it "a horror show", before adding "a utterly horrific result".

After that disappointing start to the season, Rangers' form did not improve. Notable results include a 2–0 defeat to Celtic at home in the league and defeat to Motherwell in the Scottish League Cup semi-final by the same scoreline. On 26 October, a day after a 95th-minute equaliser at Ibrox by last-placed Kilmarnock saw Rangers draw 1–1, Caixinha was sacked and Graeme Murty took over as caretaker manager for the second time. The Portuguese manager's reign was the shortest ever in the club's history, only serving 229 days in charge. It was described as "a desperate mess from start to finish".

=== Progrès Niederkorn ===
In the second qualifying round, Progrès Niederkorn played Cypriot side AEL Limassol and were eliminated 3–1 on aggregate, losing both legs. AEL Limassol only survived to the next round, where they were defeated by Austria Wien.

=== 2018–19 ===
Both clubs qualified for the Europa League again the following season, after Progrès Niederkorn improved their domestic league position from 4th to 2nd in the 2017–18 Luxembourg National Division and Rangers again finished 3rd in the 2017–18 Scottish Premiership. They each defeated two opponents to reach the third qualifying round, with the advance draw for the subsequent Play-off round pairing them up again should both make it through; However, while Rangers did advance, Progrès were narrowly defeated by Russian club FC Ufa; the Luxembourgers had already achieved their best-ever outcome in European competitions by winning the two prior rounds. Rangers went on to defeat FC Ufa in the Play-off round and thus qualified for the group stages of the Europa League.

=== 2019–20 ===
Both clubs qualified for the 2019–20 UEFA Europa League and were drawn to face each other again, this time in the second qualifying round, both having navigated the first round. Rangers won the tie and advanced with a 2–0 victory in Scotland and a 0–0 draw in Luxembourg.

== See also ==
- Lincoln Red Imps 1–0 Celtic
