= 2016–17 Rangers F.C. season =

Rangers
2016–17 season
- Chairman: Dave King
- Manager: Mark Warburton (until 10 February); Graeme Murty (from 10 February until 12 March); Pedro Caixinha (from 13 March)
- Ground: Ibrox Stadium; Glasgow, Scotland (Capacity: 50,947)
- Scottish Premiership: 3rd
- Scottish Cup: Semi-finals
- League Cup: Semi-finals
- Top goalscorer: League: Kenny Miller (11); All: Martyn Waghorn (16)
- Highest home attendance: 50,126 vs Celtic (31 December)
- Lowest home attendance: 26,079 vs Queen of the South (20 September)
- Average home league attendance: 48,883
Home colours	Away colours	Third colours

The 2016–17 season was the 137th season of competitive football by Rangers.

This season marked the return of Rangers to the top tier after winning promotion the previous season.

== Overview ==
Rangers played a total of 49 competitive matches during the 2016–17 season.

The club's pre-season plans were confirmed in May with the first-team's squad travelling to the United States for a training camp which incorporated a friendly match against United Soccer League side Charleston Battery. The fallout from the 2016 Scottish Cup Final fan violence continued with the SFA announcing a former sheriff principal would chair the independent commission into the disorder. The commission reported on 5 August and concluded the pitch invasion was sparked by the high excitement of Hibernian fans, yet neither club could be blamed. The report highlighted security plans were appropriate and that the Scottish Government should consider criminalising pitch invasions. However, Rangers raised concerns about several factual inaccuracies and contradictions in the report and asked to discuss this with the SFA. On 30 August, Rangers and Hibernian were issued with notices of complaint by the Scottish FA's compliance officer in relation to the Scottish Cup final. The end of May, post the 2016 Scottish Cup Final, saw Rangers continue preparations for the forthcoming season with the signing of English Championship winner Joey Barton from Burnley, Liverpool youth player Jordan Rossiter, former Tottenham Hotspur play-maker Niko Kranjčar and Rangers managing director Stewart Robertson also disclosed Warburton and Weir were negotiating new contracts, with the pair agreeing one-year extensions on 12 July. Warburton would go on to bring in eleven new players in total, including paying a million-pound-plus transfer fee for Englishman Joe Garner which represented the largest investment made by Rangers in a player for over five years since the signing of current club captain Lee Wallace in July 2011.

The side began the season in mid-July as part of the new look League Cup format, paired in a group with Motherwell, Annan Athletic, East Stirlingshire and Stranraer. The season got off to a winning start as the side beat Motherwell and Annan Athletic by 2-0 respectively. After topping their group and strong showings in the two subsequent rounds, Rangers set up a semi-final against Celtic, however, the side lost 1-0 which ended their participation in the competition. The side league form proved equally fruitless as the side engaged in a faulting start to the season which culminated in a humiliating 5-1 defeat to Old Firm rivals, Celtic. The opening league match of the season saw Rangers stutter to a 1-1 draw at home to Hamilton Academical and despite registering wins in the following to matches Rangers would go through the month of September without winning a league match, including defeats to both Aberdeen and Celtic. The aftermath from the latter match saw Rangers suspend midfielder Joey Barton for three weeks. Barton had been involved in a training ground bust up with fellow midfielder Andy Halliday a few days after losing to Celtic. The suspension was extended by another week on 9 October and Barton was also charged by the Scottish Football Association for breaking rules relating to gambling on football matches. Upon the completion of his suspension, Barton returned to Ibrox for a meeting on 27 October, however, upon its conclusion it emerged that he remained suspended by the club and no party made further comment. In the meanwhile, despite the first-team's indifferent league form the side still sat second in the Scottish Premiership by the end of October, even though two of the marquee summer signings had effectively been ruled out for the season, with Barton returning from suspension but being relegated to the youth-team and Niko Kranjčar suffering cruciate ligament which sidelined him for the rest of the season. Barton was unhappy at being relegated to the youth team and was signed off with stress on 8 November but the saga came to a conclusion two days later when the Englishman agreed to a mutual contract terminated.

The sides form improved through December, with the team building a four match winning run on the back of a poor 2-0 defeat to Heart of Midlothian at Tynecastle on 30 November. However, the final two matches of 2016 saw the side collect only one point from a possible six with a draw away to St Johnstone and defeat in the third Old Firm derby of the season. This left the club second in the table going into 2017 and the mid-season break, two points ahead of third placed Aberdeen although the latter did have a game in hand. The January transfer window saw the club released several former youth prospects who had failed to meet expectations, while Warburton brought in two young loanee signings from English Premier League sides in the shape of Emerson Hyndman and Jon Toral from Bournemouth and Arsenal respectively. However, the lack of any permanent outfield signings drew criticism, as did the performances of the previous summers transfers, with particular focus being placed on the role of Head of Recruitment Frank McParland. On 10 February 2017, manager Warburton, assistant manager David Weir and McParland left Rangers, with the former being replaced by Graeme Murty who was placed in caretaker control of the first-team. Several reasons for the trio departure were highlighted by the media, as well as the club. The first-team's poor performance in the first half of the season a prominent cause, which crystallised after an embarrassing 4-1 defeat away to Heart of Midlothian on 1 February and an insipid 1-1 draw at home to Ross County three days later, a match which proved to be Warburtons last game in charge of Rangers. The poor signing policy was mooted, however, the club also stated that the management team were not committed to the job and reported the team had tendered their resignations five days before being replaced which Warburton later disputed. Early contenders for the role included former Rangers manager Alex McLeish and former Rangers defender Frank de Boer. On Valentine's Day 2017, Managing director Stewart Robertson announced that the club would seek to appoint a Director of Football to work alongside a new first-team manager. Meanwhile, Murty's time in charge, began with a fourth round Scottish cup win over Greenock Morton, however, league formed remained indifferent his first two league matches ende in away defeats to Dundee and Inverness CT. This left the side in third place, six points adrift of Aberdeen, at the beginning of March. A dramatic 3-2 win of St Johnstone saw Murty register his only league win in his six-game spell as manager with his last two games in charge seeing him set up to a Scottish Cup semi-final against Celtic after a 6-0 win over Hamilton Academical, the team's largest win of the season, before drawing the third league Old Firm match. On 11 March, Rangers confirmed Caixinha as the club's sixteenth manager with the Portuguese coach appointed two days later. However, the pursuit of a Director of Football was not as successful as the Board's first choice, Southampton's Ross Wilson, turning down the offer of the role.

Away from football, the board instigated court proceedings against four of its former executives and investor Mike Ashley. The case against former chief executives Charles Green and Derek Llambias, former commercial director Imran Ahmad, former financial director Brian Stockbridge and Ashley was brought regarding a loss of income caused by retail deals agreed between the company that owns the club and Sports Direct from 2012 to 2015. Details of Rangers legal claim was revealed on 12 August after Ashley's lawyers succeeded in a bid to the documents disclosed. According to the papers lodged with the Court of Session, Rangers sought approximately £4.1m in damages caused by alleged negligence by Green and other club staff from which Ashley unfairly benefited. Rangers regained representation at a domestic football level as managing director Stewart Robertson was appointed to the SFA professional game board, although Robertson had initially signalled his intent to stand for the SPFL board but withdrew due to a lack of support. Meanwhile, the former Rangers owner Craig Whyte was the only person facing fraud charges relating to the liquidation of The Rangers Football Club Plc, proceedings began in June. In a bizarre twist, former Rangers vice-chairman Donald Findlay QC was appointed to Whyte's legal team and will defend Whyte when he faces charges relating to the acquisition of the club in May 2011 and its subsequent financial mismanagement. On 22 December, at his pre-trial Whyte entered a not guilty plea at the High Court in Glasgow. The trial concerning accusations of fraudulent acquisition of the Club began in April 2017, with former Rangers managers Walter Smith and Ally McCoist called to give evidence about the financial situation at the Oldco preceding Whyte's reign.

The corporate aftermath of Whyte's reign was continued and it was revealed that Oldco administrators have raised legal action against Police Scotland and the Lord Advocate while oldco creditors would receive £2 million less in potential payouts after the liquidation costs increased, leaving the total payout at £16.663 million. Although RIFC did settle a fine imposed upon the Oldco by the Nimmo Smith commission after a tribunal held against the club in October 2015, the total cost was £286,000. At the start of February, it was reported that liquidators of the Oldco, BDO, had launched a legal action against former administrators Duff & Phelps over the business strategies adopted by the administrating team and seeking up to £28.9m in damages.

The spectre of Mike Ashley continued to haunt Rangers in the early part of the season. Ashley lost a legal challenge to the SFA's fine over breaching dual ownership rules with reports he faced a £250,000 legal bill. In October, he was ordered to pay half of the SFA's legal costs and an additional fee for the costs incurred from receiving specialist legal advice. Moreover, further failed legal action meant Ashley was required to pay the legal costs of the SFA and Dave King following a failed bid to overturn the decision that King was a "fit and proper" person from April 2016. Despite standing down from the board of Rangers Retail in June 2016, the club's joint merchandising venture with Sports Direct, Ashley refused to relinquish his grip over Rangers retail operations. After reaching an impasse in its attempts to renegotiation the retail agreements with Sports Direct, a stand off ensued between the retailer and Rangers with the latter withdrew removing rights to use the club's intellectual property which would impact on the sale of Rangers new Puma football kits. Despite the club withdrawing permission to use its trademarks, which effectively halted the slae of kits, Puma released the 2016-17 kits at the beginning of August. This led to the board to consider replacing the Puma kits with an alternative. The contract with Rangers Retail reportedly earned the club only four pence from every pound spent on merchandise and was highlighted as a reason for Rangers weak financial performance. On Halloween 2016 it emerged that Ashley lodged a counter-suit against Rangers, King and director Paul Murray, with initial proceedings regarding the case being heard at the High Court of Justice in March 2017.

The board released RIFC's annual accounts on 28 October which revealed annual losses had been halved to £3.3m and turnover increased to £22.2m, however, further funding was required to maintain the business as a going concern. In March 2017, a decision Takeover Appeal Board (TAB) following a complaint by former Rangers chairman David Somers ruled that Dave King had been acting in concerted with other investors during King's March 2015 boardroom takeover. This meant that King was liable to purchase all of the shares in RIFC, with the TAB setting a price of 20p per share. A few days later, RIFC revealed an operating profit of £300,000 in unaudited results for the six months to 31 December 2016, although this equated to a pre-tax loss of £278,000.

In June 2016, it was announced by the SPFL that the Challenge Cup would be expanded to include teams from the Welsh Premier League, Northern Irish Premiership and an under-20s side from each Scottish Premiership club. On the same day as this announcement, the under-20s team coach Ian Durrant was relieved of his duties in a coaching reshuffle, with Rangers appointing Graeme Murty as Head Development Squad Coach on 17 August, to replace him. The draw for the first round of the 2016–17 Challenge Cup was made with Rangers under-20s side paired with Stirling University F.C. who play in the Lowland Football League. The U20 side progressed conformably beating Stirling University 4-0 at Forthbank Stadium with Josh Jeffries scoring a brace. A second round tie with Scottish League One side Stenhousemuir was set-up, again played at Forthbank, however, the side could not match its previous performance and went down 3-1 with Ryan Hardie netting the Rangers goal.

Rangers fan groups Rangers Supporters' Trust, Rangers Supporters Assembly and Rangers First merged to form Club 1872 in late May, and two-weeks later it announced that the new organisation had purchased enough shares to make it the sixth largest shareholder in RIFC. Harmony did not last for long amongst the support, however, as three directors of the Rangers First resigned from the organisation over a row regarding its governance, with Rangers First now the shareholding vehicle for Club 1872. On 30 September, the results of the first elections to Club 1872's board was announced with seven members elected including Rangers current company secretary James Blair, former requisitioner Alex Wilson, as well as the leader of Sons of Struth, Craig Houston. In November, the fans group increased its holding further to become the fifth largest individual shareholder, possessing just over five million ordinary shares, however, further setbacks saw three directors resign from the board of Club 1872 after only six months in post.

== Results & fixtures ==
Win Draw Loss Postponed

=== Pre-season and friendlies ===
6 July 2016 Friendly	Charleston Battery	1 − 2	Rangers	Charleston
19:00 (EDT)	Guerra 81'	Rangers Report	Windass 57'; Forrester 76'	Stadium: MUSC Health Stadium; Attendance: 2,500; Referee: Mike Kampmeinert

30 July 2016 Friendly	Rangers	1 − 3	Burnley	Glasgow
15:00	Mee 75' (o.g.)	Rangers Report	Gray 3' (pen.), 18', 54'	Stadium: Ibrox Stadium; Attendance: 21,818; Referee: Nick Walsh

3 September 2016 Friendly	Linfield	0 − 7	Rangers	Belfast
15:00		Rangers Report; BBC Highlights	Miller 10', 27', 30', 52'; Kranjcar 24'; Kiernan 26'; Garner 84'	Stadium: Windsor Park; Attendance: 7,656; Referee: Ian McNabb

15 January 2017 Friendly	RB Leipzig	4 − 0	Rangers	Leipzig
14:30	21' Werner; 43' Burke; 63' Poulsen; 80' Poulsen			Stadium: Red Bull Arena; Attendance: 18,780; Referee: Henry Müller

=== Scottish Premiership ===
6 August 2016 1	Rangers	1 − 1	Hamilton Academical	Glasgow
12:30	Waghorn 62'	BBC Report; Rangers Report; SPFL Report	Crawford 30'	Stadium: Ibrox Stadium; Attendance: 49,125; Referee: Don Robertson

13 August 2016 2	Dundee	1 − 2	Rangers	Dundee
12:15	O'Hara 44'	BBC Report; Rangers Report; SPFL Report	Forrester 14'; Miller 39'	Stadium: Dens Park; Attendance: 9,702; Referee: Craig Thomson

20 August 2016 3	Rangers	2 − 1	Motherwell	Glasgow
15:00	Forrester 64'; Miller 90+1'	BBC Report; Rangers Report; SPFL Report	McDonald 19'	Stadium: Ibrox Stadium; Attendance: 48,716; Referee: Bobby Madden

26 August 2016 4	Kilmarnock	1 − 1	Rangers	Kilmarnock
19:45	Boyd 29'; Taylor (red card) 63'	BBC Report; Rangers Report; SPFL Report	Tavernier 59'	Stadium: Rugby Park; Attendance: 11,800; Referee: Kevin Clancy

10 September 2016 5	Celtic	5 − 1	Rangers	Glasgow
12:00	Dembélé 33', 42', 83'; Sinclair 61'; Armstrong 90+2'	BBC Report; Rangers Report; SPFL Report	Garner 44'; Senderos (yellow card) 63' (yellow-red card) 75'	Stadium: Celtic Park; Attendance: 58,348; Referee: William Collum

17 September 2016 6	Rangers	0 − 0	Ross County	Glasgow
15:00		BBC Report; Rangers Report; SPFL Report		Stadium: Ibrox Stadium; Attendance: 47,935; Referee: Greg Aitken

25 September 2016 7	Aberdeen	2 − 1	Rangers	Aberdeen
13:00	Hayes 46'; Maddison 90'	BBC Report; Rangers Report; SPFL Report	Halliday 79' (pen.)	Stadium: Pittodrie Stadium; Attendance: 19,263; Referee: John Beaton

1 October 2016 8	Rangers	2 − 0	Partick Thistle	Glasgow
15:00	Kranjčar 33'; Halliday 40'	BBC Report; Rangers Report; SPFL Report		Stadium: Ibrox Stadium; Attendance: 49,680; Referee: Stephen Finnie

14 October 2016 9	Inverness CT	0 − 1	Rangers	Inverness
19:45		BBC Report; Rangers Report; SPFL Report	Miller 22'	Stadium: Caledonian Stadium; Attendance: 7,012; Referee: William Collum

26 October 2016 11	Rangers	1 − 1	St Johnstone	Glasgow
19:45	Garner 37'	BBC Report; Rangers Report; SPFL Report	Alston 5'	Stadium: Ibrox Stadium; Attendance: 46,563; Referee: Kevin Clancy

29 October 2016 12	Rangers	3 − 0	Kilmarnock	Glasgow
15:00	Wallace 16'; Halliday 29' (pen.); Garner 47'	BBC Report; Rangers Report; SPFL Report		Stadium: Ibrox Stadium; Attendance: 49,302; Referee: John Beaton

6 November 2016 13	Ross County	1 − 1	Rangers	Dingwall
12:00	Davies 26'	BBC Report; Rangers Report; SPFL Report	Hill 8'	Stadium: Victoria Park; Attendance: 6,590; Referee: Andrew Dallas

19 November 2016 14	Rangers	1 − 0	Dundee	Glasgow
15:00	Forrester 90+2'	BBC Report; Rangers Report; SPFL Report		Stadium: Ibrox Stadium; Attendance: 48,773; Referee: William Collum

26 November 2016 15	Partick Thistle	1 − 2	Rangers	Glasgow
12:15	Doolan 76'	BBC Report; Rangers Report; SPFL Report	Dodoo 81', 90+4'	Stadium: Firhill Stadium; Attendance: 7,951; Referee: Nick Walsh

30 November 2016 10	Hearts	2 − 0	Rangers	Edinburgh
19:45	Muirhead 44', 60'	BBC Report; Rangers Report; SPFL Report		Stadium: Tynecastle Stadium; Attendance: 16,803; Referee: Craig Thomson

3 December 2016 16	Rangers	2 − 1	Aberdeen	Glasgow
15:00	Miller 52'; Hodson 70'; Hill (yellow card) 79' (yellow-red card) 90+1'	BBC Report; Rangers Report; SPFL Report	Considine 90+4'; Jack (yellow card) 60' (yellow-red card) 90+5'	Stadium: Ibrox Stadium; Attendance: 50,003; Referee: Steven McLean

10 December 2016 17	Rangers	2 − 0	Hearts	Glasgow
15:00	Kiernan 29'; McKay 51'	BBC Report; Rangers Report; SPFL Report		Stadium: Ibrox Stadium; Attendance: 50,039; Referee: John Beaton

16 December 2016 18	Hamilton Academical	1 − 2	Rangers	Hamilton
19:45	Imrie 77'	BBC Report; Rangers Report; SPFL Report	Waghorn 45', 52'	Stadium: New Douglas Park; Attendance: 5,292; Referee: Alan Muir

24 December 2016 19	Rangers	1 − 0	Inverness CT	Glasgow
12:30	McKay 13' (o.g.)	BBC Report; Rangers Report; SPFL Report		Stadium: Ibrox Stadium; Attendance: 48,528; Referee: Don Robertson

28 December 2016 20	St Johnstone	1 − 1	Rangers	Perth
19:45	MacLean 28'	BBC Report; Rangers Report; SPFL Report	McKay 23'	Stadium: McDiarmid Park; Attendance: 7,979; Referee: Crawford Allan

31 December 2016 21	Rangers	1 − 2	Celtic	Glasgow
12:15	Miller 12'	BBC Report; Rangers Report; SPFL Report	Dembélé 33'; Sinclair 70'	Stadium: Ibrox Stadium; Attendance: 50,126; Referee: Steven McLean

28 January 2017 22	Motherwell	0 − 2	Rangers	Motherwell
15:00	McDonald (red card) 27'	BBC Report; Rangers Report; SPFL Report	Miller 72'; Hyndman 87'; O'Halloran (red card) 5'	Stadium: Fir Park; Attendance: 7,902; Referee: William Collum

1 February 2017 23	Hearts	4 − 1	Rangers	Edinburgh
19:45	Nowak 4'; Walker 49', 63'; Cowie 54'	BBC Report; Rangers Report; SPFL Report	Hyndman 36'	Stadium: Tynecastle Stadium; Attendance: 16,570; Referee: Kevin Clancy

4 February 2017 24	Rangers	1 − 1	Ross County	Glasgow
15:00	Wallace 71'	BBC Report; Rangers Report; SPFL Report	Schalk 18'	Stadium: Ibrox Stadium; Attendance: 49,428; Referee: Don Robertson

18 February 2017 25	Dundee	2 − 1	Rangers	Dundee
15:00	O'Hara 13'; Holt 41'	BBC Report; Rangers Report; SPFL Report	Garner 62'	Stadium: Dens Park; Attendance: 9,017; Referee: Craig Thomson

25 February 2017 26	Inverness CT	2 − 1	Rangers	Inverness
19:45	Tansey 45'; McKay 89'	BBC Report; Rangers Report; SPFL Report	Waghorn 67' (pen.)	Stadium: Caledonian Stadium; Attendance: 6,415; Referee: Steven McLean

1 March 2017 27	Rangers	3 − 2	St Johnstone	Glasgow
19:45	McKay 22'; Waghorn 48'; Hyndman 90+1'; Kiernan (red card) 78'	BBC Report; Rangers Report; SPFL Report	Wotherspoon 74'; Anderson 87'	Stadium: Ibrox Stadium; Attendance: 46,800; Referee: Kevin Clancy

12 March 2017 28	Celtic	1 − 1	Rangers	Glasgow
12:00	Armstrong 35'	BBC Report; Rangers Report; SPFL Report	Hill 87'	Stadium: Celtic Park; Attendance: 58,545; Referee: Bobby Madden

18 March 2017 29	Rangers	4 − 0	Hamilton Academical	Glasgow
15:00	Hyndman 26'; Hill 41'; Waghorn 55' (pen.); Wallace 74'	BBC Report; Rangers Report; SPFL Report		Stadium: Ibrox Stadium; Attendance: 49,090; Referee: Don Robertson

1 April 2017 30	Rangers	1 − 1	Motherwell	Glasgow
15:00	Garner 61'	BBC Report; Rangers Report; SPFL Report	Moult 3'	Stadium: Ibrox Stadium; Attendance: 49,198; Referee: Steven McLean

5 April 2017 31	Kilmarnock	0 − 0	Rangers	Kilmarnock
19:45		BBC Report; Rangers Report; SPFL Report		Stadium: Rugby Park; Attendance: 9,548; Referee: Alan Muir

8 April 2017 32	Aberdeen	0 − 3	Rangers	Aberdeen
12:00		BBC Report; Rangers Report; SPFL Report	Miller 79', 81'; Dodoo 83'	Stadium: Pittodrie Stadium; Attendance: 19,332; Referee: Kevin Clancy

15 April 2017 33	Rangers	2 − 0	Partick Thistle	Glasgow
15:00	Miller 39'; Toral 54'	BBC Report; Rangers Report; SPFL Report		Stadium: Ibrox Stadium; Attendance: 49,748; Referee: Nick Walsh

29 April 2017 34	Rangers	1 − 5	Celtic	Glasgow
12:00	Miller 81'	BBC Report; Rangers Report; SPFL Report	Sinclair 7' (pen.); Griffiths 18'; McGregor 52'; Boyata 66'; Lustig 87'	Stadium: Ibrox Stadium; Attendance: 49,822; Referee: John Beaton

7 May 2017 35	Partick Thistle	1 − 2	Rangers	Glasgow
12:15	Doolan 14'	BBC Report; Rangers Report; SPFL Report	McKay 83'; Garner 90+4'	Stadium: Firhill Stadium; Attendance: 6,799; Referee: Crawford Allan

13 May 2017 36	Rangers	2 − 1	Hearts	Glasgow
12:15	Garner 6'; McKay 53'	BBC Report; Rangers Report; SPFL Report	Gonçalves 51'; Buaben (red card) 26'	Stadium: Ibrox Stadium; Attendance: 47,809; Referee: Bobby Madden

17 May 2017 37	Rangers	1 − 2	Aberdeen	Glasgow
19:45	Waghorn 61'	BBC Report; Rangers Report; SPFL Report	Shinnie 9'; Christie 51'; Stockley (yellow card) 85' (yellow-red card) 90'	Stadium: Ibrox Stadium; Attendance: 48,289; Referee: John Beaton

21 May 2017 38	St Johnstone	1 − 2	Rangers	Perth
12:30	Cummins 76'	BBC Report; Rangers Report; SPFL Report	Miller 40'; Toral 53'	Stadium: McDiarmid Park; Attendance: 6,799; Referee: Andrew Dallas

=== Scottish League Cup ===
16 July 2016 Group F	Motherwell	0 − 2	Rangers	Motherwell
15:00		BBC Report; Rangers Report; SPFL Report	Tavernier 48'; Waghorn 90+1'	Stadium: Fir Park; Attendance: 6,951; Referee: Steven McLean

19 July 2016 Group F	Rangers	2 − 0	Annan Athletic	Glasgow
19:45	McKay 30'; Waghorn 74'	BBC Report; Rangers Report; SPFL Report		Stadium: Ibrox Stadium; Attendance: 31,628; Referee: Euan Anderson

22 July 2016 Group F	East Stirlingshire	0 − 3	Rangers	Stenhousemuir
19:45		BBC Report; Rangers Report; SPFL Report	Halliday 10' (pen.); Windass 35'; Dodoo 90+1'	Stadium: Ochilview Park; Attendance: 2,246; Referee: Crawford Allan

25 July 2016 Group F	Rangers	3 − 0	Stranraer	Glasgow
19:45	Waghorn 5' (pen.), 16'; Kranjčar 53'	BBC Report; Rangers Report; SPFL Report		Stadium: Ibrox Stadium; Attendance: 29,575; Referee: John Beaton

9 August 2016 Second round	Rangers	5 − 0	Peterhead	Glasgow
19:45	Kranjcar 19'; Hill 35', 56'; Kelleher 48' (o.g.); Dodoo 65'	BBC Report; Rangers Report; SPFL Report		Stadium: Ibrox Stadium; Attendance: 27,076; Referee: Andrew Dallas

20 September 2016 Quarter-finals	Rangers	5 − 0	Queen of the South	Glasgow
19:45	Holt 33'; Halliday 62'; Waghorn 63', 71', 83'	BBC Report; Rangers Report; SPFL Report		Stadium: Ibrox Stadium; Attendance: 26,079; Referee: Don Robertson

23 October 2016 Semi-finals	Rangers	0 − 1	Celtic	Glasgow
14:15		BBC Report; Rangers Report; SPFL Report	Dembélé 87'	Stadium: Hampden Park; Attendance: 50,697; Referee: Craig Thomson

=== Scottish Cup ===
21 January 2017 Fourth round	Rangers	2 − 1	Motherwell	Glasgow
12:30	Miller 84', 88'	BBC Report; Rangers Report	Moult 73'	Stadium: Ibrox Stadium; Attendance: 31,921; Referee: Craig Thomson

12 February 2017 Fifth round	Rangers	2 − 1	Greenock Morton	Glasgow
15:00	Miller 13'; Waghorn 61'	BBC Report; Rangers Report	Tidser 7'	Stadium: Ibrox Stadium; Attendance: 30,295; Referee: Andrew Dallas

4 March 2017 Quarter-finals	Rangers	6 − 0	Hamilton Academical	Glasgow
12:30	Waghorn 33' (pen.); Garner 48', 88', 90+1'; Toral 77'; Hill 82'	BBC Report; Rangers Report		Stadium: Ibrox Stadium; Attendance: 27,287; Referee: John Beaton

23 April 2017 Semi-finals	Celtic	2 − 0	Rangers	Glasgow
12:00	McGregor 11'; Sinclair 51' (pen.)	BBC Report; Rangers Report		Stadium: Hampden Park; Attendance: 49,645; Referee: William Collum

== Statistics ==
=== Squad information ===
N	Pos.	Nat.	Name	Age	Since	App	Goals	Ends	Transfer fee	Notes
1	GK	(England)	Wes Foderingham	26	2015	93	0	2019	Free	
2	DF	(England)	James Tavernier	25	2015	94	17	2019	£0.2m	
3	DF	(England)	Clint Hill	38	2016	32	6	2017	Free	
4	DF	(Republic of Ireland)	Rob Kiernan	26	2015	76	1	2018	£0.2m	
5	DF	(Scotland)	Lee Wallace (captain)	29	2011	247	25	2019	£1.5m	
6	DF	(Scotland)	Danny Wilson	25	2015	92	2	2018	Free	
7	FW	(England)	Joe Garner	29	2016	34	10	2019	£1.8m	
8	MF	(England)	Joey Barton	34	2016	8	0	2018	Free	left on 10 November
8	MF	(Spain)	Jon Toral	22	2017 (Winter)	15	3	2017	Loan	
9	FW	(Scotland)	Kenny Miller (vc)	37	2014	277	111	2018	Free	
10	FW	(Scotland)	Barrie McKay	22	2011	140	20	2018	Youth system	
11	FW	(England)	Josh Windass	23	2016	27	1	2020	£0.06m	
14	FW	(Ghana)	Joe Dodoo	21	2016	25	5	2020	£0.25m	
15	MF	(England)	Harry Forrester	26	2016 (Winter)	44	8	2019	Free	
16	MF	(Scotland)	Andy Halliday (2nd vc)	25	2015	90	15	2020	Free	
17	DF	(Northern Ireland)	Lee Hodson	25	2016	18	1	2019	Free	
18	MF	(England)	Jordan Rossiter	20	2016	6	0	2020	£0.25m	
19	MF	(Croatia)	Niko Kranjčar	32	2016	15	3	2018	Free	
20	MF	(Canada)	Fraser Aird	21	2011	85	12	2018	Youth system	left on 18 January
20	MF	(United States)	Emerson Hyndman	21	2017 (Winter)	17	4	2017	Loan	
21	MF	(England)	Matt Crooks	23	2016	3	0	2020	£0.06m	out on loan from January
23	MF	(Scotland)	Jason Holt	26	2015	84	12	2020	£0.065m	
24	DF	(Switzerland)	Philippe Senderos	32	2016	4	0	2017	Free	
25	GK	(Scotland)	Matt Gilks	34	2016	5	0	2018	Free	left on 31 January
25	GK	(England)	Jak Alnwick	23	2017 (Winter)	1	0	2020	£0.25m	
27	DF	(Scotland)	David Bates	20	2017 (Winter)	8	0	2018	Free	loan made permanent
29	FW	(Scotland)	Michael O'Halloran	26	2016 (Winter)	37	3	2020	£0.5m	
30	MF	(Northern Ireland)	Jordan Thompson	20	2015	3	0	2018	Free	out on season loan
31	FW	(Scotland)	Ryan Hardie	20	2013	10	2	2018	Youth system	out on season loan
32	GK	(Scotland)	Liam Kelly	21	2012	0	0	2018	Youth system	out on season loan
33	FW	(England)	Martyn Waghorn	27	2015	77	44	2018	£0.2m	
39	DF	(Scotland)	Ross Lyon	19	2014	0	0	2017	Youth system	
44	FW	(Scotland)	Andy Dallas	17	2016	0	0		Youth system	
45	MF	(Finland)	Serge Atakayi	18	2016	0	0	2019	Nominal	
48	MF	(Scotland)	Tom Walsh	20	2012	13	0	2017	Youth system	left on 18 January
52	MF	(Scotland)	Liam Burt	18	2015	3	0	2018	Youth system	
53	DF	(Scotland)	Kyle Bradley	18	2015	1	0	2018	Youth system	
54	DF	(Scotland)	Aidan Wilson	18	2015	2	0	2019	Youth system	
55	MF	(Scotland)	Jamie Barjonas	18	2015	4	0	2018	Youth system	
61	DF	(Malta)	Myles Beerman	18	2016	8	0	2018	Free	
64	DF	(Scotland)	Jordan Houston	17	2016	0	0	2019	Youth system	

- Last updated: 21 May 2017
- Source: Players transfer and Wikipedia players' articles
- Ordered by position on pitch.

=== Squad statistics ===
				Total			Scottish Premiership		Scottish Cup		League Cup	
No.	Pos.	Nat.	Name	Sts	App	Gls	App	Gls	App	Gls	App	Gls
1	GK	(England)	Wes Foderingham	43	43		37		4		2	
2	DF	(England)	James Tavernier	43	44	2	36	1	3		5	1
3	DF	(England)	Clint Hill	31	32	6	24	3	3	1	5	2
4	DF	(Republic of Ireland)	Rob Kiernan	31	31		24		2		5	
5	DF	(Scotland)	Lee Wallace	35	35	3	27	3	3		5	
6	DF	(Scotland)	Danny Wilson	25	26		21		1		4	
7	FW	(England)	Joe Garner	23	34	10	31	7	2	3	1	
8	MF	(England)	Joey Barton	8	9		6				3	
8	MF	(Spain)	Jon Toral	14	15	3	12	2	3	1		
9	FW	(Scotland)	Kenny Miller	39	47	14	37	11	4	3	6	
10	MF	(Scotland)	Barrie McKay	37	46	6	35	5	4		7	1
11	MF	(England)	Josh Windass	18	27	1	21		2		4	1
14	FW	(Ghana)	Joe Dodoo	6	25	5	20	3	1		4	2
15	MF	(England)	Harry Forrester	12	28	3	21	3	1		6	
16	MF	(Scotland)	Andy Halliday	34	42	5	32	3	3		7	2
17	DF	(Northern Ireland)	Lee Hodson	16	18	1	11	1	2		5	
18	MF	(England)	Jordan Rossiter	4	6		4				2	
19	MF	(Croatia)	Niko Kranjčar	8	15	3	9	1			6	2
20	MF	(United States)	Emerson Hyndman	17	17	4	13	4	4			
21	MF	(England)	Matt Crooks	1	3		2				1	
23	MF	(Scotland)	Jason Holt	36	39	1	31		4		4	1
24	DF	(Switzerland)	Philippe Senderos	4	4		3		1			
25	GK	(Scotland)	Matt Gilks	5	5						5	
25	GK	(England)	Jak Alnwick	1	1		1					
27	DF	(Scotland)	David Bates	8	8		7		1			
29	FW	(Scotland)	Michael O'Halloran	11	24		16		3		5	
30	MF	(Northern Ireland)	Jordan Thompson		1						1	
33	FW	(England)	Martyn Waghorn	28	41	16	32	7	4	2	5	7
52	MF	(Scotland)	Liam Burt		1		1					
53	DF	(Scotland)	Kyle Bradley		1		1					
54	DF	(Scotland)	Aidan Wilson	2	2		2					
55	MF	(Scotland)	Jamie Barjonas	1	4		4					
61	DF	(Malta)	Myles Beerman	7	8		7		1			

Last updated: 21 May 2017
Source: Wikipedia article
Ordered by position
0 shown as blank

=== Goal scorers ===
N	P	Nat.	Name	League	Scottish Cup	League Cup	Total
2	DF	(England)	James Tavernier	1		1	2
3	DF	(England)	Clint Hill	3	1	2	6
4	DF	(Republic of Ireland)	Rob Kiernan	1			1
5	DF	(Scotland)	Lee Wallace	3			3
7	FW	(England)	Joe Garner	7	3		10
8	MF	(Spain)	Jon Toral	2	1		4
9	FW	(Scotland)	Kenny Miller	11	3		14
10	FW	(Scotland)	Barrie McKay	5		1	6
11	MF	(England)	Josh Windass			1	1
14	FW	(Ghana)	Joe Dodoo	3		2	5
15	MF	(England)	Harry Forrester	3			3
16	MF	(Scotland)	Andy Halliday	3		2	5
17	DF	(Northern Ireland)	Lee Hodson	1			1
19	MF	(Croatia)	Niko Kranjčar	1		2	3
20	MF	(United States)	Emerson Hyndman	4			4
23	MF	(Scotland)	Jason Holt			1	1
33	FW	(England)	Martyn Waghorn	7	2	7	16
			Own goal	1		1	2

Last updated: 21 May 2017
Source: Match reports
Only competitive matches

=== Disciplinary record ===
N	P	Nat.	Name	League			Scottish Cup			League Cup			Total		
N	P	Nat.	Name	Yellow card	(yellow card) (red card)	Red card	Yellow card	(yellow card) (red card)	Red card	Yellow card	(yellow card) (red card)	Red card	Yellow card	(yellow card) (red card)	Red card
1	GK	(England)	Wes Foderingham	1									1		
2	DF	(England)	James Tavernier	7			2						9		
3	DF	(England)	Clint Hill	6	1								6	1	
4	DF	(Republic of Ireland)	Rob Kiernan	4		1							4		1
5	DF	(Scotland)	Lee Wallace	4									4		
6	DF	(Scotland)	Danny Wilson	5						1			6		
7	FW	(England)	Joe Garner	9			1						10		
8	MF	(England)	Joey Barton	1									1		
8	MF	(Spain)	Jon Toral	5									5		
9	FW	(Scotland)	Kenny Miller	1									1		
10	FW	(Scotland)	Barrie McKay							1			1		
11	MF	(England)	Josh Windass	2						1			3		
15	MF	(England)	Harry Forrester	2						2			4		
16	MF	(Scotland)	Andy Halliday	4			1						5		
17	DF	(Northern Ireland)	Lee Hodson	1									1		
19	MF	(Croatia)	Niko Kranjčar	2									2		
20	MF	(United States)	Emerson Hyndman	1									1		
21	MF	(England)	Matt Crooks	1									1		
23	MF	(Scotland)	Jason Holt	3									3		
24	DF	(Switzerland)	Philippe Senderos	2	1								2	1	
27	DF	(Scotland)	David Bates	1									1		
29	FW	(Scotland)	Michael O'Halloran	2		1							2		1
33	FW	(England)	Martyn Waghorn	6						1			7		
55	MF	(Scotland)	Jamie Barjonas	1									1		
61	DF	(Malta)	Myles Beerman				1						1		

Last updated: 21 May 2017
Source: Match reports
Only competitive matches

== Team statistics ==
=== Overall ===
Competition	Started round	Current position / round	Final position / round	First match	Last match
Scottish Premiership	6th	—	3rd	7 August	21 May
Scottish Cup	Fourth round	—	Semi-finals	21 January	23 April
League Cup	Group stages	—	Semi-finals	16 July	23 October

Source: Competitions

=== Scottish Premiership ===
==== Standings ====
Pos	Team	Pld	W	D	L	GF	GA	GD	Pts	Qualification or relegation (Note: Teams played each other three times (33 matches), before the league split into two groups (the top six and the bottom six) for the last five matches.)
1	Celtic (C)	38	34	4	0	106	25	+81	106	Qualification for the Champions League second qualifying round (Note: Since the winners of the 2016–17 Scottish Cup, Celtic, qualified for European competition based on league position, the spot awarded to the Scottish cup winners (Europa League second qualifying round) was passed to the second-placed team and the spot awarded to the second-placed team (Europa League first qualifying round) was passed to the fourth-placed team.)
2	Aberdeen	38	24	4	10	74	35	+39	76	Qualification for the Europa League second qualifying round
3	Rangers	38	19	10	9	56	44	+12	67	Qualification for the Europa League first qualifying round
4	St Johnstone	38	17	7	14	50	46	+4	58	Qualification for the Europa League first qualifying round
5	Heart of Midlothian	38	12	10	16	55	52	+3	46	

Source: Scottish Premiership, Soccerway
Rules for classification: 1) Points; 2) Goal difference; 3) Goals scored; 4) Play-off (only if deciding champion, UEFA competitions qualification and second stage group allocation).
(C) Champions

==== Results summary ====
Overall								Home						Away					
Pld	W	D	L	GF	GA	GD	Pts	W	D	L	GF	GA	GD	W	D	L	GF	GA	GD
38	19	10	9	56	44	+12	67	11	5	3	31	18	+13	8	5	6	25	26	−1

Last updated: 21 May 2017.
Source: Wikipedia article

==== Results by round ====
Round	1	2	3	4	5	6	7	8	9	10	11	12	13	14	15	16	17	18	19	20	21	22	23	24	25	26	27	28	29	30	31	32	33	34	35	36	37	38
Ground	H	A	H	A	A	H	A	H	A	A	H	H	A	H	A	H	H	A	H	A	H	A	A	H	A	A	H	A	H	H	A	A	H	H	A	H	H	A
Result	D	W	W	D	L	D	L	W	W	L	D	W	D	W	W	W	W	W	W	D	L	W	L	D	L	L	W	D	W	D	D	W	W	L	W	W	L	W
Position	6	3	1	2	3	5	7	5	4	3	5	2	3	3	2	2	2	2	2	2	2	2	2	3	3	3	3	3	3	3	3	3	3	3	3	3	3	3

Updated to match(es) played on 21 May 2017. Source: 2016–17 Scottish Premiership
A = Away; H = Home; W = Win; D = Draw; L = Loss

=== League Cup ===
==== Group F ====
Pos	Team	Pld	W	PW	PL	L	GF	GA	GD	Pts	Qualification
1	Rangers (Q)	4	4	0	0	0	10	0	+10	12	Qualification for the Second Round
2	Motherwell (Q)	4	3	0	0	1	9	3	+6	9	Qualification for the Second Round
3	Stranraer	4	2	0	0	2	5	8	−3	6	
4	Annan Athletic	4	1	0	0	3	4	7	−3	3	
5	East Stirlingshire	4	0	0	0	4	1	11	−10	0	

Source: SPFL
(Q) Qualified to the phase indicated

== Club ==
=== Technical Staff ===
Position	Staff
Manager	(England) Mark Warburton (until 10 February) (Scotland) Graeme Murty (from 12 February) (until 10 March) (Portugal) Pedro Caixinha (from 13 March)
Assistant manager	(Scotland) David Weir (until 10 February) (Portugal) Hélder Baptista (from 13 March)
Assistant coach	(Finland) Jonatan Johansson (from 9 April)
Assistant coach	(Portugal) Pedro Malta (from 16 March)
Head of Performance and Preparation	(Scotland) Craig Flannigan
Head of Strength and Conditioning	(Scotland) Gary Sherriff (until May)
Goalkeepers coach	(Scotland) Jim Stewart (until 16 March) (Spain) José Belman (from 13 March)

== Transfers ==
=== In ===
==== First-team ====
No.	Pos.	Nat.	Name	Age	Moving from	Type	Transfer window	Ends	Transfer fee	Source
11	MF	(England)	Josh Windass	22	Accrington Stanley (England)	Transfer	Summer	2020	£0.06m	
21	MF	(England)	Matt Crooks	22	Accrington Stanley (England)	Transfer	Summer	2020	£0.06m	
18	MF	(England)	Jordan Rossiter	19	Liverpool (England)	Transfer	Summer	2020	£0.25m	
8	MF	(England)	Joey Barton	33	Burnley (England)	Transfer	Summer	2018	Free	
3	DF	(England)	Clint Hill	37	Queens Park Rangers (England)	Transfer	Summer	2017	Free	
19	MF	(Croatia)	Niko Kranjčar	31	New York Cosmos (United States)	Transfer	Summer	2018	Free	
25	GK	(Scotland)	Matt Gilks	34	Burnley (England)	Transfer	Summer	2018	Free	
17	DF	(Northern Ireland)	Lee Hodson	24	Milton Keynes Dons (England)	Transfer	Summer	2019	Free	
14	FW	(Ghana)	Joe Dodoo	21	Leicester City (England)	Transfer	Summer	2020	£0.25m	
7	FW	(England)	Joe Garner	28	Preston North End (England)	Transfer	Summer	2019	£1.8m	
24	DF	(Switzerland)	Philippe Senderos	31	Grasshopper Club Zürich (Switzerland)	Transfer	Summer	2017	Free	
20	MF	(United States)	Emerson Hyndman	20	Bournemouth (England)	Loan	Winter	2017	n/a	
8	MF	(Spain)	Jon Toral	21	Arsenal (England)	Loan	Winter	2017	n/a	
25	GK	(England)	Jak Alnwick	23	Port Vale (England)	Transfer	Winter	2020	£0.25m	

Total expenditure: £2.67m

==== Academy ====
No.	Pos.	Nat.	Name	Age	Moving from	Type	Transfer window	Ends	Transfer fee	Source
27	DF	(Scotland)	David Bates	19	Raith Rovers	Loan	Summer	2017	n/a	
45	MF	(Finland)	Serge Atakayi	17	FF Jaro (Finland)	Transfer	Summer	2019	Nominal	
61	DF	(Malta)	Myles Beerman	17	Manchester City (England)	Transfer	Summer	2018	Free	
47	FW	(Morocco)	Amin Bouzaig	19	Puerto Malagueno (Spain)	Transfer	Summer	2017	Free	
46	MF	(Ivory Coast)	Ursene Mouanda	18	New Hartley Juniors (England)	Transfer	Summer	2017	Free	
27	DF	(Scotland)	David Bates	20	Raith Rovers	Transfer	Winter	2018	Free	
77	MF	(Sweden)	Izhaak Ahmed	17	Angered MBIK (Sweden)	Transfer	Winter		Undisclosed	

Total income: £0m

=== Out ===
==== First-team ====
No.	Pos.	Nat.	Name	Age	Moving to	Type	Transfer window	Transfer fee	Source
7	MF	(England)	Nicky Law	28	Bradford City (England)	End of contract	Summer	Free	
11	MF	(Scotland)	David Templeton	27	Hamilton Academical	End of contract	Summer	Free	
14	FW	(Scotland)	Nicky Clark	24	Bury (England)	End of contract	Summer	Free	
22	MF	(Northern Ireland)	Dean Shiels	31	Dundalk (Republic of Ireland)	End of contract	Summer	Free	
8	MF	(United States)	Gedion Zelalem	19	Arsenal (England)	Loan Return	Summer	n/a	
6	DF	(England)	Dominic Ball	20	Tottenham Hotspur (England)	Loan Return	Summer	n/a	
17	MF	(Scotland)	Billy King	22	Heart of Midlothian	Loan Return	Summer	n/a	
1	GK	(Scotland)	Cammy Bell	29	Dundee United	Contract terminated	Summer	Free	
	MF	(Scotland)	Robbie Crawford	23	Raith Rovers	Contract terminated	Summer	Free	
	MF	(Scotland)	Andy Murdoch	21	Greenock Morton	Contract terminated	Summer	Free	
8	MF	(England)	Joey Barton	34	Burnley (England)	Contract terminated	n/a	Free	
21	MF	(England)	Matt Crooks	22	Scunthorpe United (England)	Loan	Winter	n/a	
20	DF	(Canada)	Fraser Aird	21	Falkirk	Contract terminated	Winter	Free	
25	GK	(Scotland)	Matt Gilks	34	Wigan Athletic (England)	Transfer	Winter	Undisclosed	

Last updated: 1 February 2017
Total income: £0m

==== Academy ====
No.	Pos.	Nat.	Name	Age	Moving to	Type	Transfer window	Transfer fee	Source
31	DF	(Canada)	Luca Gasparotto	21	Falkirk	End of contract	Summer	Free	
44	DF	(Scotland)	Tom Lang	18	Dumbarton	End of contract	Summer	Free	
57	MF	(England)	Mekhi McLeod	20	Ware (England)	End of contract	Summer	Free	
36	MF	(Scotland)	Dylan Dykes	19	Ross County	End of contract	Summer	Free	
43	DF	(Scotland)	David Brownlie	19	Ross County	End of contract	Summer	Free	
34	MF	(Scotland)	Darren Ramsay	20	Annan Athletic	End of contract	Summer	Free	
54	MF	(Scotland)	Jamie Brandon	18	Heart of Midlothian	End of contract	Summer	Free	
35	MF	(Scotland)	Jamie Mills	20	Stirling Albion	End of contract	Summer	Free	
58	FW	(Scotland)	Rory Currie	18	Heart of Midlothian	End of contract	Summer	Free	
	MF	(Poland)	Przemyslaw Dachnowicz	17	Annan Athletic	End of contract	Summer	Free	
32	GK	(Scotland)	Liam Kelly	20	Livingston	Loan	Summer	n/a	
48	MF	(Scotland)	Tom Walsh	20	St Mirren	Loan	Summer	n/a	
35	MF	(Scotland)	Scott Roberts	20	Raith Rovers	Loan	Summer	n/a	
31	FW	(Scotland)	Ryan Hardie	19	St Mirren	Loan	Summer	n/a	
30	MF	(Northern Ireland)	Jordan Thompson	19	Raith Rovers	Loan	Summer	n/a	
57	GK	(Scotland)	Kieran Wright	16	Gala Fairydean Rovers	Loan	Summer	n/a	
34	DF	(Scotland)	Ryan Sinnamon	20	Annan Athletic	Loan	n/a	n/a	
56	FW	(Scotland)	Sam Jamieson	17	Stirling University	Loan	n/a	n/a	
31	FW	(Scotland)	Ryan Hardie	19	Raith Rovers	Loan	Winter	n/a	
46	MF	(Ivory Coast)	Ursene Mouanda	18	Free agent	End of contract	Winter	Free	
48	MF	(Scotland)	Tom Walsh	20	Free agent	Contract terminated	Winter	Free	
35	MF	(Scotland)	Scott Roberts	20	Raith Rovers	Contract terminated	Winter	Free	
36	MF	(Scotland)	Josh Jeffries	19	Stirling Albion	Loan	Winter	n/a	
40	DF	(Scotland)	Ross McCrorie	18	Dumbarton	Loan	Winter	n/a	
51	DF	(Scotland)	Jason Krones	18	Gala Fairydean Rovers	Loan	Winter	n/a	
34	DF	(Scotland)	Ryan Sinnamon	20	Elgin City	Contract terminated	Winter	Free	
37	DF	(Scotland)	Lewis White	19	Free agent	Contract terminated	Winter	Free	

Last updated: 26 January 2017
Total income: £0m

=== New contracts ===
==== First-team ====
N	P	Nat.	Name	Age	Date signed	Contract length	Expiry date	Source
5	DF	(Scotland)	Lee Wallace	28	20 June	3 years	May 2019	
MAN		(England)	Mark Warburton	53	12 July	3 years	May 2019	
AMAN		(Scotland)	David Weir	46	12 July	3 years	May 2019	
4	DF	(Republic of Ireland)	Rob Kiernan	25	19 July	2 years	May 2018	
1	GK	(England)	Wes Foderingham	25	19 July	3 years	May 2019	
2	DF	(England)	James Tavernier	24	21 July	3 years	May 2019	
9	FW	(Scotland)	Kenny Miller	37	28 April	1 year	May 2018	

Last updated: 28 April 2017

==== Academy ====
N	P	Nat.	Name	Age	Date signed	Contract length	Expiry date	Source
38	FW	(England)	Jordan Gibson	18	5 May	1 year	May 2017	
64	DF	(Scotland)	Jordan Houston	16	18 October	3 years	May 2019	
63	DF	(Scotland)	Scott Gray	16	20 October	3 years	May 2019	
40	DF	(Scotland)	Ross McCrorie	18	24 December	2 years & 6 months	May 2019	
41	GK	(Scotland)	Robby McCrorie	18	24 December	2 years & 6 months	May 2019	
30	MF	(Northern Ireland)	Jordan Thompson	20	11 January	1 year & 6 months	May 2018	
54	DF	(Scotland)	Aidan Wilson	18	9 May	2 years	May 2019	
59	FW	(Scotland)	Zak Rudden	17	9 May	3 years	May 2020	
58	MF	(Scotland)	Jack Thomson	17	9 May	3 years	May 2020	

Last updated: 9 May 2017
