= Myles Beerman =

Maltese footballer

Personal information
- Full name: Myles Beerman
- Date of birth: 13 March 1999 (age 27)
- Place of birth: Mġarr, Malta
- Height: 1.77 m (5 ft 9 1/2 in)
- Position: Left back

Team information
- Current team: Floriana
- Number: 3

Youth career
- 2007–2014: Floriana
- 2014–2016: Manchester City

Senior career*
Years	Team	Apps	(Gls)
2016–2019	Rangers	7	(0)
2018	→ Queen of the South (loan)	3	(0)
2018	→ Birkirkara (loan)	8	(0)
2019	→ Gżira United (loan)	6	(0)
2019–2021	Hibernians	13	(1)
2020–2021	→ Sliema Wanderers (loan)	23	(0)
2021–2026	Sliema Wanderers	114	(2)
2026-	Floriana	18	(3)

International career^{‡}
2014–2016	Malta U17	6	(1)
2016	Malta U19	2	(0)
2016–	Malta U21	6	(1)
2017–	Malta	18	(0)
- * Club domestic league appearances and goals as of 17 May 2026 ‡ National team caps and goals as of 20:00, 12 November 2026 (UTC)

Myles Beerman (born 13 March 1999) is a Maltese footballer who plays as a defender for Maltese Premier League club Floriana.

== Club career ==
Beerman began his football career at Floriana in Malta before moving to England in 2014 to sign for Manchester City in a move which was investigated by FIFA amid suggestions that he was under the legal transfer age when he joined Manchester City in 2014. Beerman was released in May 2016 and then signed for Rangers after agreeing a two-year contract. Beerman made his professional debut for the Ibrox club in a Scottish Premiership match versus Kilmarnock on 6 April 2017, when he played at left-back.

On 4 January 2018, Beerman joined Scottish Championship club Queen of the South until the end of May 2018 on a development loan deal. On 17 May 2019, it was announced that Beerman would be released by Rangers at the end of the season.

On 15 August 2019, Beerman joined Maltese side Hibernians on a three-year contract.

In January 2026, after spending 5 years with Sliema Wanderers, Beerman signed a new contract with Floriana, coming back to his former club after 12 yearsCamilleri, Valhmor (8 January 2026). "Myles Beerman leave Sliema Wanderers to join Floriana". SportsDesk..

== International career ==
Beerman has represented Malta at various age levels and featured at the 2014 UEFA Under-17 Championship in Malta, aged only fifteen. On 9 May 2017, Beerman was selected for the Malta national football team for the first time in his career at 18-years-old. Beerman was also eligible to play for the England national team through his father. In June 2017, Beerman made his debut for Malta in a friendly match versus Ukraine.

== Career statistics ==
As of 23 January 2020

Club statistics
Club	Season	League			Cup (Note: Includes Scottish Cup and Maltese FA Trophy)		League Cup (Note: Includes Scottish League Cup)		Other		Total	
Club	Season	Division	Apps	Goals	Apps	Goals	Apps	Goals	Apps	Goals	Apps	Goals
Rangers	2016–17	Scottish Premiership	7	0	1	0	—		—		8	0
Rangers	2017–18	Scottish Premiership	0	0	0	0	0	0	1 (Note: Matches in the Scottish Challenge Cup for Rangers Under-20s)	0	1	0
Rangers	Total		7	0	1	0	0	0	1	0	9	0
Queen of the South (loan)	2017–18	Scottish Championship	3	0	1	0	0	0	0	0	4	0
Birkirkara (loan)	2018–19	Maltese Premier League	8	0	0	0	—		—		8	0
Gżira United (loan)	2018–19	Maltese Premier League	6	0	3	0	—		—		9	0
Hibernians	2019–20	Maltese Premier League	8	0	0	0	—		—		8	0
Career total			32	0	5	0	0	0	1	0	38	0
