= Liam Kelly (footballer, born 1996) =

Scottish footballer (born 1996)

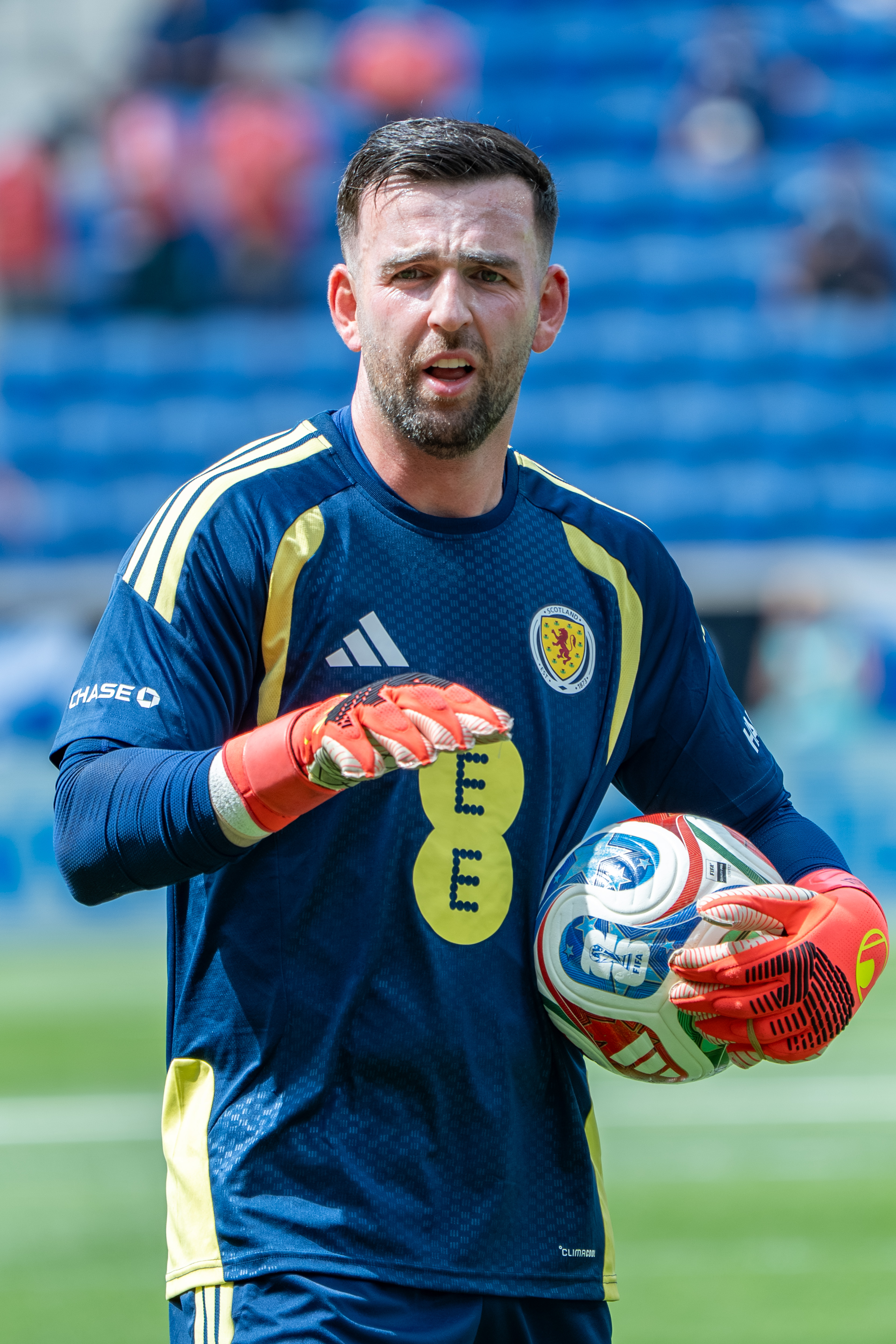
- Kelly with Scotland in 2026

Personal information
- Full name: Liam Patrick Kelly
- Date of birth: 23 January 1996 (age 30)
- Place of birth: Glasgow, Scotland
- Height: 6 ft 2 in (1.87 m)
- Position: Goalkeeper

Team information
- Current team: Rangers
- Number: 31

Youth career
- 2006–2015: Rangers

Senior career*
Years	Team	Apps	(Gls)
2015–2018	Rangers	0	(0)
2016–2017	→ Livingston (loan)	34	(0)
2018–2019	Livingston	36	(0)
2019–2021	Queens Park Rangers	19	(0)
2021	→ Motherwell (loan)	18	(0)
2021–2024	Motherwell	114	(0)
2024–	Rangers	10	(0)

International career^{‡}
2011–2012	Scotland U16	3	(0)
2012	Scotland U17	5	(0)
2012–2015	Scotland U19	11	(0)
2016	Scotland U21	2	(0)
2023–	Scotland	3	(0)
- * Club domestic league appearances and goals as of 23:29, 2 April 2024 (UTC) ‡ National team caps and goals as of 23:46, 30 May 2026 (UTC)

Liam Patrick Kelly (born 23 January 1996) is a Scottish professional footballer who plays as a goalkeeper for Scottish Premiership club Rangers and the Scotland national team. Kelly has previously played for Motherwell, East Fife, Livingston and Queens Park Rangers.

== Club career ==
=== Rangers ===
Kelly joined Rangers aged ten and played in the club's youth sides, notably scoring the final penalty during Rangers under-17s Glasgow Cup win in 2012.

After training with the first-team for the majority of the 2014–15 season and featuring on the bench, Kelly signed a contract extension on 25 February 2015, until the summer of 2018.

==== Loan moves ====
On 8 January 2016, Kelly joined East Fife in Scottish League Two on a six-month loan. During his time at Bayview Stadium, Kelly played in 16 league matches and was part of the side which won the League Two title. Upon returning to Rangers, Kelly travelled to the United States with the first team for a pre-season training camp. However, on 15 July 2016, he was loaned out to the then Scottish League One team Livingston until January 2017. He made his debut for Livi the next day in a League Cup match against St Mirren.

=== Livingston ===
Kelly moved to Livingston, where he had previously been on loan, for an undisclosed fee in June 2018. He played regularly for Livingston in the 2018–19 season, but then invoked a release clause in his contract.

=== Queens Park Rangers ===
On 14 June 2019, Kelly signed for Queens Park Rangers for an undisclosed fee on a four-year contract. It was reported that the transfers fee was £50,000 with Livingston retaining a sell on bonus. He made his debut on 13 August 2019, in an EFL Cup match against Bristol City saving two penalties in a 5–4 penalty shootout win.

==== Motherwell (loan) ====
On 6 January 2021, Kelly moved on loan to Motherwell for the remainder of the season.

=== Motherwell ===
On 5 July 2021, Kelly returned to Motherwell on a permanent transfer from Queens Park Rangers, signing a three-year contract. He was ever present in the league during his three seasons at Fir Park, making 133 appearances overall.

=== Return to Rangers ===
On 27 June 2024, Rangers completed the signing of goalkeeper Liam Kelly on a two-year deal. Kelly, a former Rangers academy player, returned to Ibrox after his contract expired at Motherwell. Kelly made his first competitive appearance for Rangers on 21 December 2024, in a 1–0 victory against Dundee at Ibrox. He then started in an Old Firm game for the first time, as Rangers won 3–0 against Celtic on 2 January 2025. Following a dip of form for regular starter Butland, Kelly was chosen to play in a Europa League tie against Athletic Bilbao. He saved a penalty kick in the first leg, which ended in a goalless draw. Kelly played in 10 league games during the 2024–25 season, recording four clean sheets.

== International career ==
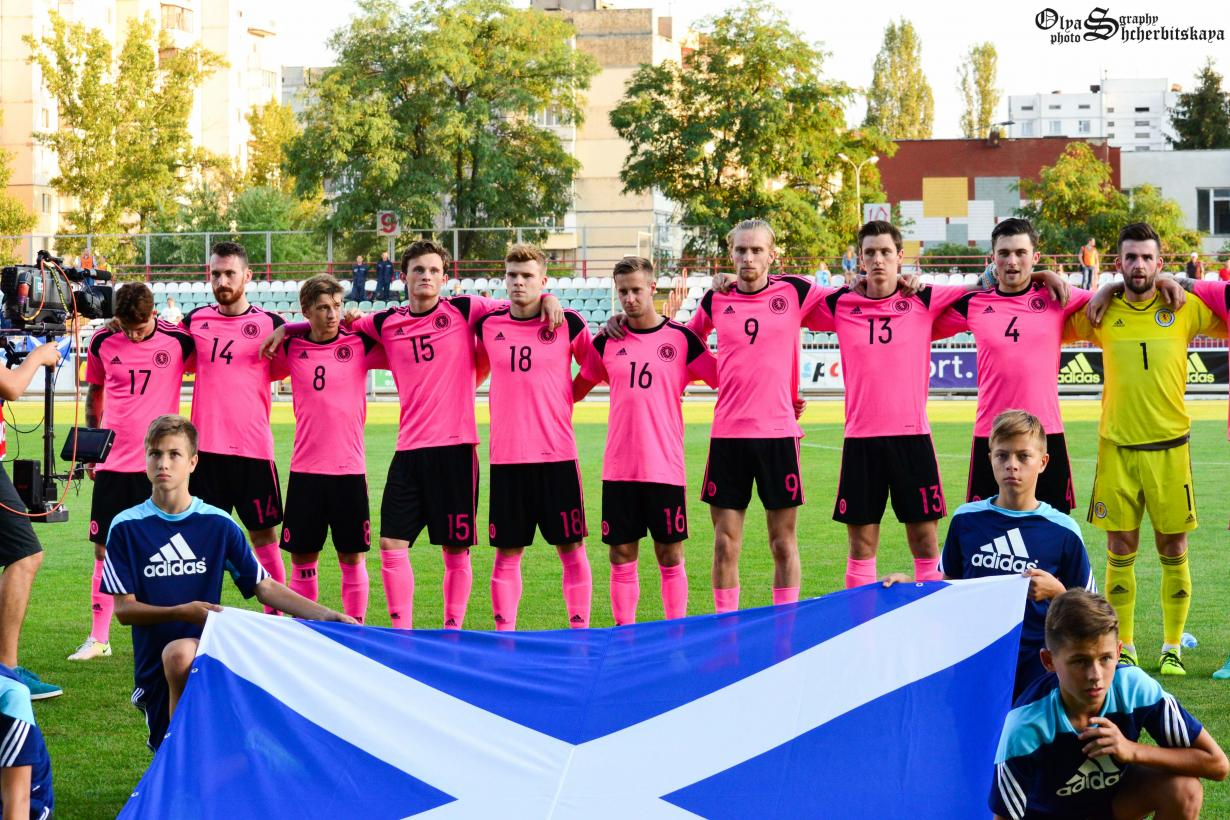
Kelly (No 1) with Scotland U21s in Ukraine, 2016

Kelly has represented Scotland at various age levels, up to an including the under-21 team.

Kelly received his first call-up to the senior Scotland squad in March 2019 for games against Kazakhstan and San Marino. After many call-ups to the squad without playing, Kelly finally made his full international debut in a friendly against France on 17 October 2023. He was selected in the Scotland squads for UEFA Euro 2024 and the 2026 FIFA World Cup.

== Style of play ==
Kenny Miller, who played alongside Kelly at Rangers and was also his player-manager at Livi, said of him in 2018: "He's excellent with the ball at his feet. He's a proper modern-day goalkeeper".

== Personal life ==
He is the brother of Boeung Ket defender Sean Kelly and Dumbarton goalkeeper Shay Kelly. In October 2023 Liam and Sean faced each other from 12 yards in a Scottish Premiership fixture, with Sean scoring his penalty past Liam.

== Career statistics ==
=== Club ===
As of match played 8 February 2026

Appearances and goals by club, season and competition
Club	Season	League			National cup		League cup		Continental		Total	
Club	Season	Division	Apps	Goals	Apps	Goals	Apps	Goals	Apps	Goals	Apps	Goals
Rangers	2015–16	Scottish Championship	0	0	0	0	0	0	0	0	—	
Rangers	2016–17	Scottish Premiership	0	0	0	0	0	0	—		—	
Rangers	2017–18	Scottish Premiership	0	0	0	0	0	0	0	0	—	
Rangers	Total		0	0	0	0	0	0	0	0	0	0
East Fife (loan)	2015–16	Scottish League Two	16	0	0	0	0	0	0	0	16	0
Livingston (loan)	2016–17	Scottish League One	34	0	2	0	4	0	0	0	40	0
Livingston	2018–19	Scottish Premiership	36	0	1	0	5	0	—		42	0
Queens Park Rangers	2019–20	Championship	19	0	1	0	2	0	—		22	0
Queens Park Rangers	2020–21	Championship	0	0	0	0	0	0	—		0	0
Queens Park Rangers	Total		19	0	1	0	2	0	0	0	22	0
Motherwell (loan)	2020–21	Scottish Premiership	18	0	3	0	0	0	—		21	0
Motherwell	2021–22	Scottish Premiership	38	0	3	0	5	0	—		46	0
Motherwell	2022–23	Scottish Premiership	38	0	2	0	2	0	2	0	44	0
Motherwell	2023–24	Scottish Premiership	38	0	2	0	3	0	0	0	43	0
Motherwell	Total		132	0	10	0	10	0	2	0	154	0
Rangers	2024–25	Scottish Premiership	10	0	1	0	0	0	2	0	13	0
Rangers	2025–26	Scottish Premiership	0	0	2	0	1	0	0	0	3	0
Rangers	Total		10	0	3	0	1	0	2	0	16	0
Career total			243	0	17	0	22	0	4	0	284	0

== Honours ==
=== Club ===
Rangers under-17

- Glasgow Cup: 2012

East Fife

- Scottish League Two: 2015–16

Livingston

- Scottish League One: 2016–17
