= Aidan Wilson =

Scottish footballer

Personal information
- Full name: Aidan Wilson
- Date of birth: 2 January 1999 (age 27)
- Place of birth: Helensburgh, Scotland
- Height: 6 ft 2 in (1.88 m)
- Position: Defender

Team information
- Current team: Airdrieonians
- Number: 5

Youth career
- Ardencaple Boys Club
- 2006–2017: Rangers

Senior career*
Years	Team	Apps	(Gls)
2017–2020	Rangers	2	(0)
2018	→ Dumbarton (loan)	3	(0)
2018	→ Forfar Athletic (loan)	9	(0)
2019–2020	→ Edinburgh City (loan)	10	(1)
2020–2022	Crusaders	52	(4)
2022–2024	Glentoran	51	(6)
2024–	Airdrieonians	29	(0)

International career^{‡}
2014	Scotland U16	1	(0)
2017–2018	Scotland U19	8	(0)
- * Club domestic league appearances and goals as of 23 February 2026 ‡ National team caps and goals as of 21:34, 11 June 2017 (UTC)

Aidan Wilson (born 2 January 1999) is a Scottish footballer who plays as a defender and plays for Scottish League One club Airdrieonians. He previously played for Rangers, Dumbarton, Forfar Athletic, Edinburgh City, Crusaders and most recently Glentoran.

== Club career ==
Wilson joined Rangers aged seven from his local boys club Ardencaple. He signed a new contract on 9 May 2017 which tied him to the club until May 2019. Wilson made his debut for Rangers in a Scottish Premiership match against Aberdeen on 17 May 2017. Wilson agreed a further one-year extension to his Rangers contract in October 2017. He joined Scottish Championship club Dumbarton on loan in February 2018. On 3 August, Wilson joined Forfar Athletic on loan until January 2019.

After a successful trial period, Wilson signed for NIFL Premiership side Crusaders on 11 September 2020 on a two-year contract. On 7 May 2022, he came on as a substitute in the final of the 2021–22 Irish Cup which Crusaders won 2–1 after extra time.

At the end of the 2021–22 season Wilson signed for Glentoran. On 7 May 2024, it was announced that Wilson would be one of ten players departing Glentoran upon the expiry of their contracts.

On 8 June 2024, Wilson joined Scottish Championship club Airdrieonians.

== International career ==
Wilson has represented Scotland U16 in the Victory Shield and U17 and U19 in the Euro Championship.

== Career statistics ==
As of 13:35, 8 May 2022 (UTC)

Club	Season	League			FA Cup		League Cup		Other		Total	
Club	Season	Division	Apps	Goals	Apps	Goals	Apps	Goals	Apps	Goals	Apps	Goals
Rangers	2016–17	Scottish Premiership	2	0	0	0	0	0	—		2	0
Rangers	2017–18	Scottish Premiership	0	0	0	0	0	0	—		0	0
Dumbarton (loan)	2017–18	Scottish Championship	3	0	1	0	0	0	0	0	4	0
Forfar Athletic (loan)	2018–19	Scottish League One	9	0	0	0	0	0	0	0	9	0
Edinburgh City (loan)	2019–20	Scottish League Two	10	1	2	0	0	0	0	0	12	1
Crusaders	2020–21	NIFL Premiership	25	2	0	0	0	0	2	0	27	2
Crusaders	2021–22	NIFL Premiership	27	2	5	0	1	0	2	0	35	2
Career total			76	5	8	0	1	0	4	0	89	5

== Honours ==
Crusaders

- Irish Cup: 2021–22
