= Emmanuel Françoise =

French footballer (born 1987)

Personal information
- Date of birth: 30 June 1987 (age 39)
- Place of birth: Metz, France
- Height: 1.76 m (5 ft 9 in)
- Positions: Winger; forward

Senior career*
Years	Team	Apps	(Gls)
2007–2008	Metz	1	(0)
2008–2009	1. FC Kaiserslautern II	6	(0)
2009–2010	Dudelange	17	(4)
2010–2013	Visé	64	(16)
2013–2014	Cremonese	13	(2)
2014–2017	Fola Esch	63	(26)
2017–2020	Progrès Niederkorn	60	(24)
2020–2021	Swift Hesperange	22	(4)
2021–2023	Racing FC Union Luxembourg	40	(10)
Total		286	(96)
- * Club domestic league appearances and goals

Emmanuel Françoise (born 8 June 1987) is a French professional footballer who played as a winger or forward.

== Career ==
In May 2017 it was announced that Françoise would move to Progrès Niederkorn from league rivals Fola Esch for the 2017–18 season.

In mid-June 2017 Françoise was found guilty of doping, having tested positive for the substance terbutaline through a urine sample he provided following the league match between F91 Dudelange and Fola Esch. In July he was issued a warning, but was not suspended for the offence having admitted to having taken the medication for his asthma.

While at Progrès Niederkorn, he scored the opening goal in an unexpected 2–0 win against Scottish side Rangers in the UEFA Europa League, where the tie ended 2–1 to Progrès, their first ever win in European competition. It was the first goal in Europe for Progrès since 1981.

In April 2020, after three years with Progrès Niederkorn in which he scored 24 goals in 30 league appearances and 2 goals in 11 European cup appearances, Françoise was linked with a move to Swift Hesperange.
