= Niko Kranjčar =

Croatian footballer (born 1984)

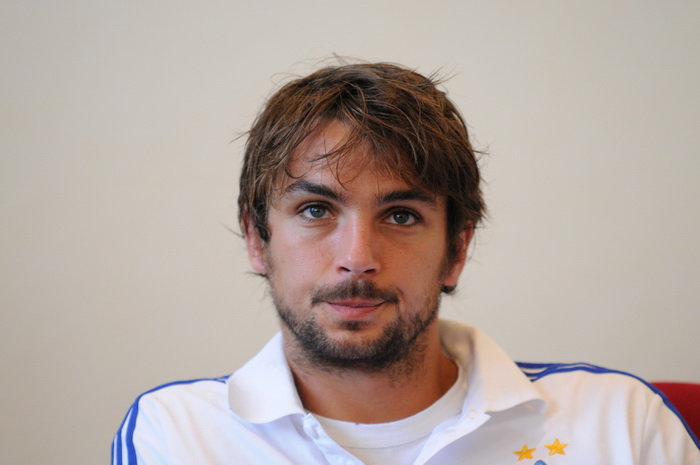
- Kranjčar with Dynamo Kyiv in 2012

Personal information
- Full name: Niko Kranjčar
- Date of birth: 13 August 1984 (age 42)
- Place of birth: Zagreb, Croatia
- Height: 1.86 m (6 ft 1 in)
- Position: Attacking midfielder

Team information
- Current team: Croatia U21 (assistant coach)

Youth career
- Rapid Vienna
- Dinamo Zagreb

Senior career*
Years	Team	Apps	(Gls)
2001–2005	Dinamo Zagreb	84	(19)
2005–2006	Hajduk Split	50	(15)
2006–2009	Portsmouth	83	(9)
2009–2012	Tottenham Hotspur	49	(9)
2012–2016	Dynamo Kyiv	13	(4)
2013–2015	→ Queens Park Rangers (loan)	51	(4)
2016	New York Cosmos	7	(1)
2016–2018	Rangers	16	(1)
Total		353	(61)

International career
2000–2001	Croatia U16/17	17	(8)
2001–2002	Croatia U19	7	(2)
2002–2005	Croatia U21	15	(2)
2004–2013	Croatia	81	(15)

Managerial career
- 2021–2023: Croatia U19 (assistant coach)
- 2024–: Croatia U21 (assistant coach)
- * Club domestic league appearances and goals

Niko Kranjčar (pronounced [nǐːko krâɲtʃaːr]; born 13 August 1984) is a Croatian former professional footballer. He primarily played as an attacking midfielder, but could also operate as a winger or second striker. As of 5 May 2021, he works as an assistant to Josip Šimunić at the Croatia national under-19 team.

He has played with clubs in his homeland, playing for Dinamo Zagreb before sparking controversy by making a move to their fierce rivals Hajduk Split in January 2005. A transfer to England with Portsmouth soon followed in August 2006, and after several years of attempting to hold on to their key players, Portsmouth decided to sell him at the start of the 2009–10 season, opening the way for a move to Tottenham in September 2009, where he was reunited with his former manager at Portsmouth, Harry Redknapp. He moved on to Ukrainian side Dynamo Kyiv in 2012, where he spent a two-year period on loan at Queens Park Rangers, reuniting with Redknapp for a third time. He finished his career with brief spells in the United States with New York Cosmos and Scotland with Rangers before retiring in 2018.

Hailed as the next Robert Prosinečki, Kranjčar was given his international debut by his father Zlatko in August 2004, and went on to represent his country at the 2006 FIFA World Cup, UEFA Euro 2008 and UEFA Euro 2012. In total he won 81 caps for the Croatia national team, scoring 16 goals in the process. His final match for the national team was on 15 October 2013, as he missed the 2014 FIFA World Cup because of a leg injury.

== Early life ==
Kranjčar is the son of former Dinamo Zagreb and Rapid Vienna forward Zlatko and he spent his childhood years in Austria, where his father was playing. Therefore, he holds an Austrian passport and this qualified him as a European Union player prior to the enlargement of the EU and Croatia's admission in 2013.

== Club career ==
=== Dinamo Zagreb ===
Kranjčar spent most of his youth playing for Dinamo Zagreb, and later, at the age of 17, became the youngest captain of the squad for the first time. He also became one of the youngest goalscorers in the Prva HNL as he scored on his league debut for Dinamo at the age of 16 before helping them win the double of a Croatian cup and a league title in 2003 and then the Croatian cup again the following season. Such abilities and assistance led him to become a fan favorite, he began to receive comparison to French football legend Zinedine Zidane.

=== Hajduk Split ===
In January 2005, Kranjčar experienced a disagreement with the Dinamo Zagreb management, which led to a surprise transfer to Dinamo's biggest rivals, Hajduk Split, which was accomplished thanks to Hajduk's sporting director Igor Štimac for a reported fee of €1.88 million. Over 10,000 people came to his official unveiling at the Poljud stadium. Outside Kranjčar's family home, Dinamo fans lit 200 blue candles in mock memoriam of his "death" of moving to their rival.

Kranjčar made his league debut for Hajduk on 26 February 2005 in a 2–2 draw against Osijek. He scored his first goal for Hajduk on 23 April 2005 at Poljud in a 5–1 victory against NK Inter. He scored his second goal in the decisive 6–0 victory against Varteks on 28 May 2005.

Kranjčar helped Hajduk win the 2004–05 Prva HNL which was their 2nd league trophy in a row. Thanks to his fine games and good sportmenship, Kranjčar became the fans' favourite player instantly. Despite having a lot of international offers from abroad, he decided to stay at Hajduk for the next season. In the 2005–06 Prva HNL he was Hajduk's top goalscorer, with 10 goals.

After the 2006 World Cup, the world press hailed Kranjčar for his talents, and several clubs immediately showed interest in the young star. Among such clubs were Stade Rennais and the Spanish Club Celta Vigo. In August 2006, Rennes bid €4.5 million for Kranjčar, which Hajduk rejected, stating they felt they should get more for the player. Later on the same day, however, Kranjčar then moved for a reported £3.5 million (€5.2 million) to Portsmouth on 31 August 2006.

=== Portsmouth ===
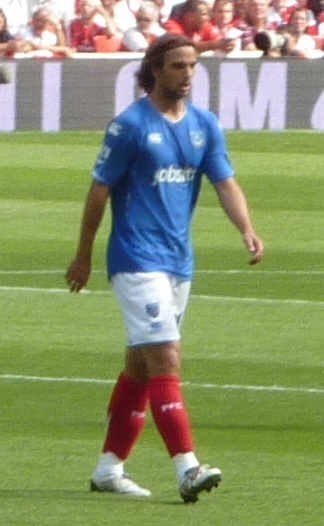
Kranjčar playing for Portsmouth in 2009

Kranjčar made his Premier League debut for Portsmouth on 1 October 2006 as he played all 90 minutes in their 2–1 away defeat to Tottenham Hotspur. He scored his first Premier League goal on 31 March 2007 at Fulham, giving Portsmouth an early 1–0 lead in a match that eventually ended in a 1–1 draw. He made a total of 24 appearances and scored two goals in his first Premier League season. The following season, he played an integral role in Portsmouth's FA Cup win.

At the beginning of the 2008–09 season, AS Monaco apparently had a bid of £12 million rejected for Kranjčar, however this was denied by Monaco. On 12 February 2009, with Portsmouth battling relegation, Kranjčar publicly declared his desire to quit Portsmouth and move to a bigger club. Arsenal and AS Monaco have previously been linked with moves for the Croatian International. In August, Kranjčar stated: "For now I am staying, but we have not strengthened like I would have liked us to. That's why I will not sign a new contract. It's one more season for me and then I'm off".

=== Tottenham Hotspur ===
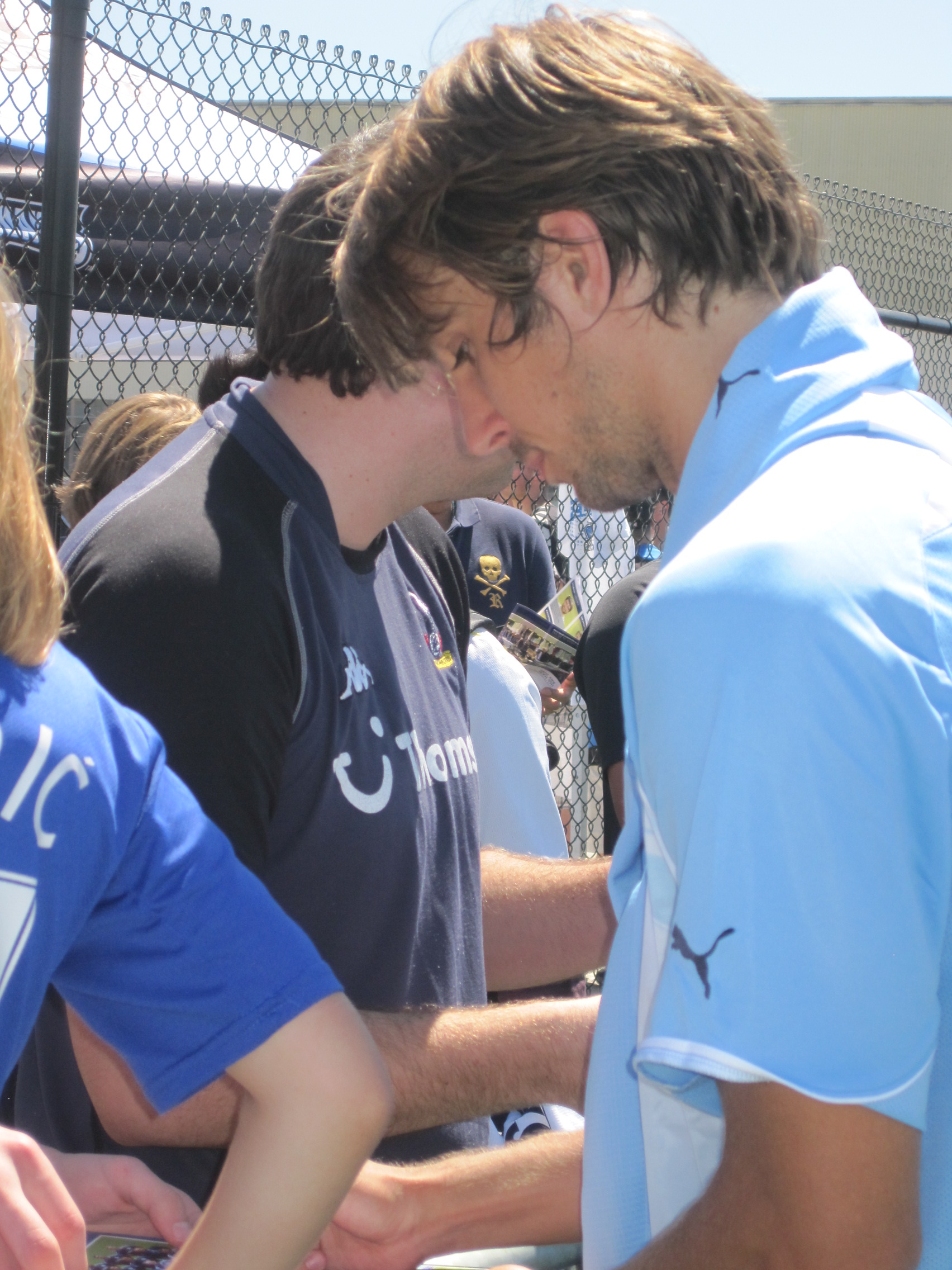
Niko Kranjčar in 2010.

On 1 September 2009, Kranjčar joined Tottenham Hotspur from Portsmouth after the two clubs agreed a transfer fee of around £2.5 million, although the actual price was undisclosed. The deal was completed just before the transfer deadline passed with him signing a four-year contract. It was reported that Everton had made a late bid to sign Kranjčar, but the player opted to sign for Spurs, stating that: "Everton is also a big club but, in the end, the tradition and greatness of Tottenham made the difference. I also knew manager Harry Redknapp, and Luka Modrić and Vedran Ćorluka told me great things about the club". Kranjčar made his debut for Tottenham as a substitute in the 3–1 defeat to Manchester United at home. On 26 September 2009, Kranjčar made his first Premier League start for Tottenham in a 5–0 home thrashing of Burnley. He scored his first goal for the club in a Premier League match away to Bolton Wanderers on 4 October 2009. On 22 November 2009, Kranjčar scored for Tottenham in a 9–1 home thrashing of Wigan Athletic, with Jermain Defoe scoring a record equalling five. On 16 December 2009, Kranjčar grabbed a brace in a 3–0 home victory over Manchester City. On 20 March 2010, Kranjčar scored the winning goal in a 1–2 away victory over Stoke City. Kranjčar has found difficulty being chosen in starting line-ups, due to the rise in prominence of Gareth Bale, who also plays in his position. However Kranjčar continued to make a pivotal contribution to the season scoring late winning goals in two consecutive matches, coming on as a substitute against Bolton Wanderers in a 2–1 victory at White Hart Lane, and away to Sunderland in another 2–1 victory. In the beginning of the 2011–12 season, Kranjčar scored a 35-yard goal during a pre-season friendly, a 5–3 win against Milton Keynes Dons.

=== Dynamo Kyiv ===
On 6 June 2012, Ukrainian club Dynamo Kyiv confirmed the signing of Niko Kranjčar on a four-year contract. The transfer fee was estimated to be about £5.5 million. After his move to Dynamo Kyiv, Niko Kranjčar says he is "happy" and satisfied" of joining Dynamo Kyiv and does admits his time at Tottenham was ‘disappointing’. Kranjčar revealed that Dynamo Kyiv first took interest in signing him in 2003 during his time at Dinamo Zagreb. He scored twice on Matchday 5 against Volyn Lutsk. He scored another two goals against Karpaty Lviv on 14 September 2012. After having a good beginning of the season, in November Kranjčar felt an old ankle injury, which left him out of the game until the end of the year. He came back just in time for the second half of the season, after the winter break, but managed to make only two appearances before he got injured again while performing for the Croatia national team in March 2013. This time he was left out of the pitch until the end of the season.

After spending 2 years on loan at Queens Park Rangers from 2013 to 2015, Kranjčar returned to Dynamo Kyiv's first team.

==== Queens Park Rangers (loan) ====
On 2 September 2013, Kranjčar joined Queens Park Rangers on a season long loan to unite with his former boss Harry Redknapp, who signed two other players from former club Tottenham Hotspur. This was the third time Redknapp signed Kranjčar, having previously worked with him at Portsmouth and Tottenham. After a groin problem delayed his debut, Kranjčar made his first appearance for his new club against Yeovil Town, coming on as a second halftime substitute. He made his full debut before the Loftus Road crowd against Middlesbrough in late September 2013. Kranjčar scored his first goal of the season in the match against Millwall, when he also made his first assist of the season and was voted "Man of the Match". In January 2014 he scored once again to give QPR a 1–0 lead against Ipswich Town. He left the club on 1 July 2014 following the expiration of his loan, but returned on the last day of the summer transfer window on 1 September 2014 for another season-long loan.

=== New York Cosmos ===
After being released by Dinamo Kyiv, he went to USA and trained with Cosmos. However, he could not be a part of the squad due to foreign players' rule. In the middle of the March 2016, when one of the foreign players obtained American citizenship, Kranjčar finally signed for Cosmos.

=== Rangers ===
On 23 June 2016, Kranjčar signed for Rangers of the Scottish Premiership on a two-year deal, stating that it was a "big honour and privilege" and a "big responsibility" to be joining a club of such size. He made his debut for the club in a League Cup match against Motherwell on 16 July. and made his first start, three days later against Annan Athletic. Kranjčar scored his first goal for the club on 25 July, netting the third in a 3–0 win over Stranraer and netted his first league goal in a 2–0 win over Partick Thistle on 1 October. Kranjčar suffered a cruciate ligament injury in early October which would sideline him for the rest of the season. In January 2017, Kranjčar spoke about the progress of his rehabilitation and estimated a return in six-months; although he did acknowledge the severity of the injury could have led to him retiring. He made his return to competitive first-team action after eight months out, against Progrès Niederkorn in the Europa League on 29 June 2017. Kranjčar was released by the club on 23 March 2018, after struggling with injury throughout his spell in Glasgow.

== International career ==
Kranjčar was previously a part of the Croatia national Under-16, Under-17, Under-19 and Under-21 teams before advancing to the senior national team. His senior debut for Croatia came on 18 August 2004 in a friendly match against Israel. He was a regular for Croatia during their qualifying campaign for the 2006 World Cup, making nine appearances and scoring two goals, including a brilliant single effort against Bulgaria. Niko was then chosen for "Young guns firing for World Cup glory" on eurosport.com with some of the greatest talents in the world, such as Lionel Messi, Lukas Podolski and future Pompey teammate Sulley Muntari. He went on to play in all of Croatia's three group stage matches at the final tournament, proving to be a prestigious player for his impressive performances.

With the departure of his father as national team manager, Kranjčar became a regular for Croatia in their qualifying campaign for Euro 2008, having appeared in all 12 matches and scoring two goals. The most famous of such was his long range opener for Croatia during their final match away to England. Croatia eventually won the game 3–2, resulting in England's failure to qualify for the final tournament. He then scored in a friendly match against Scotland with a spectacular effort from just inside the penalty area in a match played that ended 1–1, the equalising goal coming from Kenny Miller. He was a part of the Croatia team in Euro 2008 tournament, being a starter in 2 group match games and quarter-final game against Turkey. In Croatia's campaign for the 2010 World Cup he scored a goal against Kazakhstan. He was included in Croatia's 23-man squad for Euro 2012 and played in two out of three group stage games, missing only the last game against Spain. He missed the 2014 FIFA World Cup due to hamstring injury and since then, he has not received a single call-up for any of the national team's future matches. His last international game was on 15 October 2013.

== Personal life ==
Kranjčar is the son of Croatian footballer and manager Zlatko Kranjčar. He was married to Simona Fistrić and the couple lived in Cuffley, Hertfordshire. Fistrić gave birth on 7 March 2011 to a baby girl by the name of Loree. However, Kranjčar and Fistrić divorced less than a year after Loree's birth. He is currently in a relationship with actress Zrinka Cvitešić.

== Career statistics ==
=== Club ===
Appearances and goals by club, season and competition
Club	Season	League			Cup		Continental		Other		Total	
Club	Season	Division	Apps	Goals	Apps	Goals	Apps	Goals	Apps	Goals	Apps	Goals
Dinamo Zagreb	2000–01	Prva HNL	0	0	2	0	0	0	—		2	0
Dinamo Zagreb	2001–02	Prva HNL	24	2	6	0	2	0	—		32	2
Dinamo Zagreb	2002–03	Prva HNL	21	4	1	0	2	0	—		24	4
Dinamo Zagreb	2003–04	Prva HNL	24	10	6	0	7	2	1	0	38	12
Dinamo Zagreb	2004–05	Prva HNL	16	2	1	0	5	2	1	0	23	4
Dinamo Zagreb	Total		85	18	16	0	16	4	2	0	119	22
Hajduk Split	2004–05	Prva HNL	13	2	4	0	0	0	—		17	2
Hajduk Split	2005–06	Prva HNL	32	10	6	3	2	0	1	1	41	14
Hajduk Split	2006–07	Prva HNL	5	3	0	0	0	0	—		5	3
Hajduk Split	Total		50	15	10	3	2	0	1	1	63	19
Portsmouth	2006–07	Premier League	23	2	4	0	0	0	—		26	2
Portsmouth	2007–08	Premier League	34	4	8	1	0	0	—		42	5
Portsmouth	2008–09	Premier League	21	3	3	1	1	0	1 (Note: Appearance in the 2008 FA Community Shield)	0	25	4
Portsmouth	2009–10	Premier League	4	0	1	1	0	0	—		5	1
Portsmouth	Total		82	9	16	3	1	0	1	0	100	12
Tottenham; Hotspur	2009–10	Premier League	24	6	8	2	0	0	—		32	8
Tottenham; Hotspur	2010–11	Premier League	13	2	2	0	6	0	—		21	2
Tottenham; Hotspur	2011–12	Premier League	12	1	3	0	3	0	—		18	1
Tottenham; Hotspur	Total		49	9	13	2	9	0	—		71	11
Dynamo Kyiv	2012–13	Ukrainian; Premier League	13	4	0	0	8	0	—		21	4
Dynamo Kyiv	2015–16	Ukrainian; Premier League	0	0	1	0	0	0	—		1	0
Dynamo Kyiv	Total		13	4	1	0	8	0	—		22	4
Queens Park; Rangers (loan)	2013–14	Championship	29	2	1	0	0	0	3 (Note: Appearances in the 2014 Football League play-offs)	0	33	2
Queens Park; Rangers (loan)	2014–15	Premier League	22	2	0	0	0	0	—		22	2
Queens Park; Rangers (loan)	Total		51	4	1	0	0	0	3	0	55	4
New York Cosmos	2016	NASL	7	1	0	0	—		—		7	1
Rangers	2016–17	Scottish Premiership	9	1	6	2	—		—		15	3
Rangers	2017–18	Scottish Premiership	7	0	2	0	2	0	—		11	0
Rangers	Total		16	1	8	2	2	0	—		26	3
Career total			353	61	63	10	38	5	7	1	461	77

=== International ===
Appearances and goals by national team and year
National team	Year	Apps	Goals
Croatia	2004	5	0
Croatia	2005	9	3
Croatia	2006	15	0
Croatia	2007	9	2
Croatia	2008	8	1
Croatia	2009	8	2
Croatia	2010	7	6
Croatia	2011	7	0
Croatia	2012	8	0
Croatia	2013	5	1
Total		81	15

Scores and results list Croatia's goal tally first, score column indicates score after each Kranjčar goal.

List of international goals scored by Niko Kranjčar
No.	Date	Venue	Cap	Opponent	Score	Result	Competition
1	4 June 2005	Vasil Levski Stadium, Sofia, Bulgaria	9	Bulgaria	3–1	3–1	2006 FIFA World Cup qualification
2	17 August 2005	Stadion Poljud, Split, Croatia	10	Brazil	1–0	1–1	Friendly
3	7 September 2005	Ta' Qali Stadium, Ta' Qali, Malta	12	Malta	1–0	1–1	2006 FIFA World Cup qualification
4	12 September 2007	Estadi Comunal, Aixovall, Andorra	35	Andorra	4–0	6–0	UEFA Euro 2008 qualifying
5	21 November 2007	Wembley Stadium, London, England	38	England	1–0	3–2	UEFA Euro 2008 qualifying
6	26 March 2008	Hampden Park, Glasgow, Scotland	40	Scotland	1–0	1–1	Friendly
7	11 February 2009	Steaua Stadium, Bucharest, Romania	47	Romania	2–1	2–1	Friendly
8	14 October 2009	Astana Arena, Astana, Kazakhstan	53	Kazakhstan	2–1	2–1	2010 FIFA World Cup qualification
9	3 March 2010	King Baudouin Stadium, Brussels, Belgium	55	Belgium	1–0	1–0	Friendly
10	9 October 2010	Ramat Gan Stadium, Ramat Gan, Israel	59	Israel	1–0	2–1	UEFA Euro 2012 qualifying
11	9 October 2010	Ramat Gan Stadium, Ramat Gan, Israel	59	Israel	2–0	2–1	UEFA Euro 2012 qualifying
12	12 October 2010	Maksimir Stadium, Zagreb, Croatia	60	Norway	2–1	2–1	Friendly
13	17 November 2010	Maksimir Stadium, Zagreb, Croatia	61	Malta	1–0	3–0	UEFA Euro 2012 qualifying
14	17 November 2010	Maksimir Stadium, Zagreb, Croatia	61	Malta	3–0	3–0	UEFA Euro 2012 qualifying
15	11 October 2013	Maksimir Stadium, Zagreb, Croatia	80	Belgium	1–2	1–2	FIFA World Cup 2014 qualifying

== Honours ==
Dinamo Zagreb

- Croatian First Football League: 2002–03
- Croatian Cup: 2000–01, 2001–02, 2003–04
- Croatian Supercup: 2002, 2003

Hajduk Split

- Croatian First Football League: 2004–05
- Croatian Supercup: 2005

Portsmouth

- FA Cup: 2007–08

Queens Park Rangers

- Football League Championship play-offs: 2014

Individual

- Croatian Football Hope of the Year: 2002
- Prva HNL Player of the Year: 2003, 2005
- HNL's Footballer of the Year: 2003
- SN Yellow Shirt Award: 2004
