= Club 1872 =

Rangers F.C. supporters group

- Founded: 26 May 2016
- Founder: Rangers First; Rangers Supporters' Trust
- Type: Not-for-profit; CIC
- Purpose: To encourage and facilitate supporters of Rangers to buy and hold shares in the club
- Location: Glasgow, Scotland
- Key people: James Blair; Joanne Percival; Laura Fawkes
- Website: club1872.co.uk

Club 1872 is a supporters group for fans of the Scottish football club Rangers.

The group was formed in May 2016 by the amalgamation of two supporter shareholder projects; Rangers First, and the Rangers Supporters Trust's Buy Rangers scheme.

== History ==
=== Rangers Supporters' Trust ===
In January 2003, three of the trust's founders, Mark Dingwall (then the editor of the Rangers fanzine Follow Follow), Colin Glass and Gordon Semple, later joined by Stevie Tyrie, decided to form a trust, after attending an open day held by Supporters Direct, an umbrella body for supporters' groups. Glass, the Trust's first chairman, met officials of Rangers in March 2003, and although the club declined the Trust's requests for help, a launch meeting was held on 5 April 2003, with former Rangers player Mark Walters as a guest of honour.

In the Summer of 2008, seven members of the twenty-strong Trust Board resigned over the issue of supporter representation on the Rangers FC plc board. These included the chair and vice-chair who had led negotiations with the chairman of Rangers FC, Sir David Murray. A majority of Trust board members were unhappy at the lack of progress and the lack of feedback and accountability shown. On 31 May 2008 Stephen Smith and Derek Howie (acting Chair and Secretary) assumed joint responsibility for conducting the Trust's business. Smith was subsequently elected as the Trust's chair, and media spokesperson David Edgar as vice-chair. A year later, the trust were involved in a war of words with the then Rangers chairman David Murray over its "We Deserve Better" campaign. Murray accused the trust of "whipping up hysteria" regarding the club's perceived lack of transparency and fan involvement whilst the trust hit back telling the chairman to not "shoot the messenger".

=== Rangers First ===
Formed in 2014 as a community interest company, it was the largest independent fan ownership group associated with the club. The first meeting which led to the establishment of Rangers First took place at the Louden Tavern on 14 February 2014.

A member of Supporters Direct Council, Richard Atkinson, was invited to present by the owner of the Louden Tavern, Robert Marshall, on what the options and experience of fan ownership models in Scotland were to date. This was an open meeting and all fans and supporters clubs were invited to attend. The idea presented to an audience of approx 120 people the options for a new organisation to be set up dedicated to the purchasing of shares in the club in order to achieve real influence by fans over the board room of the club.

As a result of this meeting, the room unanimously voted to continue meeting together over subsequent weeks and this led to the establishment of Rangers First a few weeks later. The name Rangers First was suggested at the second open meeting held at the Louden.

=== Merger to form Club 1872 ===
In October 2015, the Rangers Fan Board contacted several Rangers fans group to gauge support for the creation of a single fans organisation capable of buying a significant block of shares and forcing out unwanted investors holding onto interests in the club. In May 2016, after months of discussion, Rangers fan groups Rangers Supporters' Trust and Rangers First merged to form Club 1872 and launched the new organisation at Ibrox Stadium. The move also saw the dissolution of the Rangers Supporters Assembly and the Rangers Fans Board.

== Organisation structure ==
There are five entities which form Club 1872 and all of these entities are overseen by a single board of directors (the board of Club 1872). It will consist of Rangers First which will be used as the shareholding vehicle, the Rangers Supporters Trust which will be used for projects, while Club 1872 Limited will control ownership of Club 1872 intellectual property and other assets other than shares or money which had been donated specifically for projects. The other entities of the organisation are Supporters Voice Limited which is responsible for promoting the views of Rangers fans both to the club and wider media. Finally, Rangers supporters clubs will provide a liaison service between the wider network of supporters groups across the world.

Structure of Club 1872
Entity	Responsibility
Rangers First	Shareholding vehicle through which new shares are purchased
Rangers Supporters Trust	Club themed projects which members have backed
Club 1872 Limited	Owner of organisations assets except shares or monies donated for projects
Supporters Voice Limited	Communication of member views to club and media
Rangers Supporters clubs	Liaison and support the network of supporter groups

== Shareholding in Rangers Football Club ==
Upon its formation the organisation held 4,590,496 shares in Rangers International Football Club plc ("RIFC"), the combined total of the shares held by the Rangers Supporters Trust and Rangers First. This equated to approximately 5.6% of issued share capital. However, less than three-week after it was announced that Club 1872 had purchased additional shares, enough to make it the sixth largest individual shareholder in RIFC. In November, the fans group increased its holding further to become the fifth largest individual shareholder, possessing just over five million ordinary shares. In June 2017 Club 1872 announced they had purchased 4.46% of shares from MASH Holdings Limited making Club 1872 the second largest shareholder in RIFC, with a 10.71% total shareholding.
