= Dálcio =

Bissau-Guinean footballer

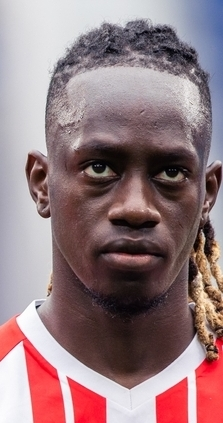
- Dálcio with Red Star Belgrade in 2024

Personal information
- Full name: Euciodálcio Gomes
- Date of birth: 22 May 1996 (age 30)
- Place of birth: Almada, Portugal
- Height: 1.86 m (6 ft 1 in)
- Position: Midfielder

Team information
- Current team: APOEL
- Number: 8

Youth career
- 2006–2007: Beira Mar Almada
- 2007–2008: Foot-21
- 2008–2010: Sporting CP
- 2010–2011: Foot-21
- 2011–2012: Ginásio Corroios
- 2012–2015: Belenenses

Senior career*
Years	Team	Apps	(Gls)
2014–2015	Belenenses	17	(0)
2015–2019	Benfica B	50	(2)
2015	→ Belenenses (loan)	3	(0)
2017–2018	→ Rangers (loan)	1	(0)
2018–2019	→ Belenenses SAD (loan)	23	(0)
2019–2021	Panetolikos	61	(1)
2021–2022	Ionikos	31	(4)
2022–2024	APOEL	65	(5)
2024–2025	Red Star Belgrade	13	(0)
2025	→ Ankaragücü (loan)	13	(1)
2025–	APOEL	37	(2)

International career^{‡}
2015	Portugal U19	8	(2)
2016	Portugal U20	6	(1)
2022–	Guinea-Bissau	31	(0)
- * Club domestic league appearances and goals as of 11 October 2026 ‡ National team caps and goals as of 29 September 2026

Euciodálcio Gomes (born 22 May 1996), known as Dálcio, is a professional footballer who plays as a midfielder for Cypriot First Division club APOEL. Born in Portugal, he represents the Guinea-Bissau national team.

== Club career ==
On 18 January 2015, Dálcio made his professional debut with Belenenses in a 2014–15 Primeira Liga match against Gil Vicente.

In the 2015–16 season he joined defending champions Benfica, but stayed at Belenenses on a one-year loan deal. In January 2016, he returned to Benfica, joining its reserve team in the Segunda Liga.

On 6 June 2017, Dálcio joined Scottish Premiership side Rangers on a season-long loan deal. He made his debut for Rangers against Progrès Niederkorn in the first qualifying round of Europa League on 29 June 2017, and also featured in the second leg on 4 July. He made his only league appearance for Rangers after coming on in added time against Hamilton Academical in a 4–1 away win on 29 September.

After a loan to Belenenses SAD for the 2018–19 season, Dálcio made a permanent move from Benfica to Panetolikos in Super League Greece. On 25 August 2019, he scored his first goal in a 2–1 away loss against PAOK.

On 3 July 2021, he joined Ionikos on a free transfer.

== International career ==
Born in Portugal, Dálcio is of Bissau-Guinean descent. He was called up to represent the Guinea-Bissau national team for a pair of friendlies in March 2022. He debuted with Guinea-Bissau in a friendly 3–0 win over Equatorial Guinea on 23 March 2022.

== Career statistics ==
=== Club ===
As of match played 22 December 2024

Appearances and goals by club, season and competition
Club	Season	League			National cup		League cup		Continental		Total	
Club	Season	Division	Apps	Goals	Apps	Goals	Apps	Goals	Apps	Goals	Apps	Goals
Belenenses	2014–15	Primeira Liga	16	0	0	0	2	1	—		18	1
Belenenses	2015–16	Primeira Liga	3	0	0	0	1	0	4	0	8	0
Belenenses	2018–19	Primeira Liga	23	0	1	0	4	0	—		28	0
Belenenses	Total		42	0	1	0	7	1	—		54	1
Benfica B	2015–16	LigaPro	17	1	0	0	—		—		17	0
Benfica B	2016–17	LigaPro	33	1	0	0	0	0	—		33	0
Benfica B	Total		50	2	0	0	0	0	—		50	2
Rangers	2017–18	Scottish Premiership	1	0	0	0	0	0	2	0	3	0
Panetolikos	2019–20	Super League Greece	30	1	4	1	—		—		34	2
Panetolikos	2020–21	Super League Greece	31	0	2	0	—		—		33	0
Panetolikos	Total		61	1	6	1	—		—		67	2
Ionikos	2021–22	Super League Greece	30	2	3	1	—		—		33	3
APOEL	2022–23	Cypriot First Division	34	2	4	2	—		6	0	44	4
APOEL	2023–24	Cypriot First Division	31	3	0	0	—		6	0	37	3
APOEL	Total		65	5	4	2	—		12	0	81	7
Red Star Belgrade	2024–25	Serbian SuperLiga	13	0	1	0	—		7	0	21	0
Career total			262	10	15	4	7	1	25	0	309	15
