= Kyle Bradley =

Scottish footballer

Personal information
- Date of birth: 14 February 1999 (age 27)
- Place of birth: Scotland
- Position: Defender

Youth career
- Rangers

Senior career*
Years	Team	Apps	(Gls)
2017–2019	Rangers	1	(0)
2017–2018	→ Clyde (loan)	1	(0)
2018–2019	→ Annan Athletic (loan)	26	(2)
2019–2020	Annan Athletic	23	(0)
2020–2021	East Kilbride		
2021–	Pollok	15	(0)
- * Club domestic league appearances and goals as of 8 June 2022

Kyle Bradley (born 14 February 1999) is a Scottish footballer who plays for Pollok in the West of Scotland Football League.

He also spent spells at Rangers, on loan at Clyde and Annan Athletic, and later at East Kilbride F.C.

== Career ==
Bradley signed a new contract in March 2016 which tied him to the club until May 2018. He made his debut for Rangers as a substitute in a Scottish Premiership match against St Johnstone on 21 May 2017, replacing Martyn Waghorn in the 85th minute. On 4 July 2017, Bradley joined Scottish League Two side Clyde on loan until January 2018.

In September 2018, Bradley joined Annan Athletic on loan.

On 17 May 2019, it was announced that Bradley would be released by Rangers. Bradley was later signed on a permanent basis by Annan.

Bradley signed for Lowland League team East Kilbride on 9 October 2020.

In May 2021, Bradley signed for West of Scotland Football League side Pollok F.C. on an initial one-year deal, making his debut in their opening league match against Blantyre Victoria in July.

== Career statistics ==
As of match played 14 October 2017

Appearances and goals by club, season and competition
Club	Season	League			Scottish Cup		League Cup		Europe		Other		Total	
Club	Season	Division	Apps	Goals	Apps	Goals	Apps	Goals	Apps	Goals	Apps	Goals	Apps	Goals
Rangers	2016–17	Scottish Premiership	1	0	0	0	0	0	—		—		1	0
Rangers U-20s	2016–17	SPFL Development League	—		—		—		—		2 (Note: Appearances in the Scottish Challenge Cup)	0	2	0
Clyde	2017–18	Scottish League Two	1	0	0	0	3	0	—		0	0	4	0
Career total			2	0	0	0	3	0	0	0	2	0	7	0
