= 2012–13 Rangers F.C. season =

Rangers
2012–13 season
- Chairman: Craig Whyte (until 14 May); Malcolm Murray (from 14 June)
- Manager: Ally McCoist
- Ground: Ibrox Stadium; Glasgow, Scotland (Capacity: 50,987)
- Scottish Third Division: 1st (Promoted)
- Scottish Cup: Fifth round
- League Cup: Quarter-finals
- Challenge Cup: Quarter-finals
- Top goalscorer: League: Andrew Little (22); All: Lee McCulloch (26)
- Highest home attendance: 50,048 vs Berwick Rangers (4 May 2013)
- Lowest home attendance: 23,195 vs Elgin City (2 December 2012)
- Average home league attendance: 45,744
Home colours	Away colours	Third colours

The 2012–13 season was the 133rd season in the history of Rangers Football Club. They played in the Scottish Third Division, the fourth tier of Scottish Football, for the first time in their history after being refused entry to the Scottish Premier League due to the company's liquidation.

== Overview ==
Rangers played a total of 47 competitive matches during the 2012–13 season. Prior to the Rangers first team even kicking a ball in a football match that season, there were a series of off-the-field issues that had to be resolved. In June 2012, a criminal investigation was launched into Craig Whyte's takeover of Rangers Football Club Plc after a preliminary examination of the information passed to police by administrators Duff & Phelps. While 4 July saw ten of the other eleven Scottish Premier League clubs vote against Rangers being admitted to the league for the 2012–13 season, meaning the club had to apply for a place in the Scottish Football League. Over a week later, on 13 July, twenty-five of the thirty SFL member clubs voted to offer Rangers a place in the Third Division of the Football League for the start of the season. However, as part of the transfer of SFA membership from oldco to newco, both companies along with the SFA, SPL and SFL had to agree to a five-way agreement. The club received a twelve-month transfer ban which prevented it from registering any players over the age of eighteen, which began on 1 September and concluded at the end of the 2013 summer transfer window.

Further to this the SPL instigated an investigation into Rangers transfer dealings between 2001 and 2011, after allegations of dual contracts between Rangers Football Club PLC (the company that formerly owned Rangers) and its staff. The investigation was conducted by a commission headed by Lord Nimmo Smith and concluded in February 2013. The commission's findings concluded that Rangers Football Club PLC did not fully disclose to the football authorities all payments that it made to players and staff; however, this non-disclosure did not effect the playing staff's eligibility. Therefore, instead of a potential penalty that included the stripping of titles won by the first team, the punishment was only a fine of £250,000 for Rangers Football Club PLC. Alongside the SPL investigation, HMRC's first tier tax tribunal's came to a conclusion during the season. On 20 November, the First-tier Tax Tribunal ruled that the Rangers Football Club PLC had not contravened tax law with its use of Employee Benefit Trusts, however HMRC subsequently launched an appeal against the first-tier verdict in March 2013.

Turmoil continued inside Ibrox Stadium despite the return of Walter Smith as a non-executive director in November 2012. The company owning the club, Rangers Football Club Ltd, was floated on the stock exchange the following month, raising over £22m from an Initial public offering. The tenure of Charles Green as chief executive proved volatile, with a number of contentious issues arising throughout the season. This included the sacking of Spanish striker Francisco Sandaza for reportedly attempting to negotiate transfer away from the club, and allegations from former chairman Craig Whyte that he and Green had an agreement over the purchase of Rangers that allowed Whyte to retain a stake in the company. An internal investigation by the club later concluded that there was no link between Green and Whyte. The culmination of Green's tenure resulted in him resigning as chief executive after the club launched an internal investigation into alleged racist remarks Green had made to commercial director Imran Ahmad.

The off the field drama was to be mirrored by some on field, at least initially, as Rangers struggled to get to grips with life in the Third Division. The very first match in August away to Peterhead ended in a 2–2 draw and that was only thanks to a late goal from Andrew Little with the Toon out playing Rangers for large spells in the match. The away day league formed resulted in subsequent draws to Annan Athletic and Berwick Rangers. The side clinched the Scottish Third Division title, and promotion to the Second Division, on 30 March after a goalless draw away to Montrose and second placed Queens Park losing.

On a busy day in April, the SFA wrote to Rangers chief executive Charles Green seeking clarification about his business dealings with Craig Whyte, the Police carried out a series of searches relating to the purchase of Rangers Football Club by Craig Whyte from David Murray and, Whyte was ordered to pay £18m to the finance firm Ticketus after he lost a claim against him at the High Court in London.

== Players ==
=== Squad information ===
Pos.	Nat.	Name	Age	Since	App	Goals	Ends	Transfer fee	Notes
GK	(Scotland)	Neil Alexander	35	2008 (Winter)	94	0	2013	Free	
GK	(Scotland)	Scott Gallacher	23	2006	0	0	2015	Youth system	
GK	(Scotland)	Blair Currie	19	2009	0	0	2013	Youth system	
GK	(Republic of Ireland)	Alan Smith	19	2010	0	0	2014	Free	
GK	(Scotland)	Liam Kelly	18	2012	0	0	2015	Free	
DF	(Romania)	Dorin Goian	31	2011	42	1	2014	£0.8m	out on season loan
DF	(United States)	Carlos Bocanegra (captain)	33	2011	40	3	2014	£0.4m	out on season loan
DF	(Scotland)	Darren Cole	21	2008	5	0	2013	Youth system	
DF	(Scotland)	Kirk Broadfoot	28	2007	121	1	2013	Free	left on 29 August
DF	(Brazil)	Emílson Cribari	33	2012	34	0	2014	Free	
DF	(France)	Sébastien Faure	22	2012	23	1	2015	Free	
DF	(Greece)	Anestis Argyriou	25	2012	27	0	2014	Free	
DF	(Scotland)	Ross Perry	23	2006	36	0	2015	Youth system	
DF	(Northern Ireland)	Chris Hegarty	20	2010	29	0	2015	Free	
DF	(Canada)	Luca Gasparotto	17	2011	4	0	2015	Free	
DF	(Scotland)	Lee Wallace (vc)	25	2011	76	6	2016	£1.5m	
MF	(United States)	Alejandro Bedoya	25	2011	13	1	2014	£0.4m	left on 10 August
MF	(Scotland)	Lewis Macleod	18	2010	31	3	2017	Youth system	
MF	(Scotland)	Robbie Crawford	20	2010	27	5	2017	Youth system	
MF	(Scotland)	Andy Murdoch	18	2011	1	0	2015	Youth system	
MF	(Scotland)	Ian Black	28	2012	38	2	2015	Free	
MF	(Scotland)	Kyle Hutton	22	2008	47	2	2014	Youth system	
MF	(United States)	Maurice Edu	26	2008	125	12	2013	£2.6m	left on 25 August
MF	(Poland)	Kamil Wiktorski	19	2009	0	0	2013	£0.1m	left on 29 January
MF	(Northern Ireland)	Andrew Mitchell	21	2010	9	0	2013	Free	
MF	(Northern Ireland)	Dean Shiels	28	2012	29	12	2016	Free	
MF	(Scotland)	David Templeton	24	2012	26	15	2016	£0.8m	
MF	(Canada)	Fraser Aird	18	2011	22	3	2018	Youth system	
MF	(Australia)	Francesco Stella	21	2012	0	0	2013	Free	left on 15 January
MF	(Scotland)	Tom Walsh	16	2012	1	0	2013	Youth system	
MF	(Scotland)	Lee McCulloch (captain)	34	2007	211	46	2015	£2.25m	
MF	(Scotland)	Barrie McKay	18	2011	42	4	2017	Free	
MF	(Scotland)	Danny Stoney	16	2012	3	0	2016	Youth system	
FW	(England)	Kane Hemmings	22	2008	10	1	2013	Youth system	
FW	(Scotland)	Kal Naismith	21	2008	24	3	2015	Youth system	
FW	(Northern Ireland)	Andrew Little	23	2007	60	32	2014	Youth system	
FW	(Spain)	Francisco Sandaza	28	2012	20	2	2015	Free	left on 3 April
FW	(Scotland)	Kevin Kyle	31	2012	15	3	2013	Free	left on 16 March

- Last updated: 4 May 2013
- Source: Players transfer and Wikipedia players' articles
- Ordered by position on pitch.

=== Transfers ===
==== In ====
Pos.	Nat.	Name	Age	Moving from	Type	Transfer window	Ends	Transfer fee	Source
MF	(Scotland)	Ian Black	27	Heart of Midlothian	Transfer	Summer	2015	Free	
MF	(Northern Ireland)	Dean Shiels	27	Kilmarnock	Transfer	Summer	2016	Free	
FW	(Spain)	Francisco Sandaza	27	St Johnstone	Transfer	Summer	2015	Free	
FW	(Scotland)	Kevin Kyle	31	Heart of Midlothian	Transfer	Summer	2013	Free	
DF	(Brazil)	Emílson Cribari	32	Cruzeiro (Brazil)	Transfer	Summer	2014	Free	
DF	(France)	Sébastien Faure	21	Lyon (France)	Transfer	Summer	2015	Free	
DF	(Greece)	Anestis Argyriou	24	AEK Athens (Greece)	Transfer	Summer	2014	Free	
MF	(Australia)	Francesco Stella	21	Siena (Italy)	Transfer	Summer	2013	Free	
MF	(Scotland)	David Templeton	23	Heart of Midlothian	Transfer	Summer	2016	£0.7m	
FW	(Russia)	Sergey Kundik	17	Spartak Moscow (Russia)	Transfer	n/a	2013	Free	

Total expenditure: £0.7m

==== Out ====
Pos.	Nat.	Name	Age	Moving to	Type	Transfer window	Transfer fee	Source
DF	(England)	Kyle Bartley	21	Arsenal (England)	Loan return	Summer	n/a	
DF	(Bosnia and Herzegovina)	Saša Papac	32	Retired	End of contract	Summer	n/a	
FW	(Northern Ireland)	David Healy	32	Bury (England)	End of contract	Summer	n/a	
MF	(France)	Salim Kerkar	24	Charlton Athletic (England)	End of contract	Summer	n/a	
GK	(Scotland)	Grant Adam	21	St Mirren	End of contract	Summer	n/a	
MF	(Scotland)	Gordon Dick	19	Albion Rovers	End of contract	Summer	n/a	
DF	(Scotland)	Ewan McNeil	18	Norwich City (England)	End of contract	Summer	n/a	
MF	(Scotland)	Anthony Marenghi	18	Ayr United	End of contract	Summer	n/a	
DF	(Scotland)	Adam Hunter	19	Ayr United	End of contract	Summer	n/a	
DF	(Algeria)	Adel Gafaiti	17	Norwich City (England)	End of contract	Summer	n/a	
DF	(Northern Ireland)	Josh Robinson	18	Crusaders (Northern Ireland)	End of contract	Summer	n/a	
FW	(England)	Jack Werndly	19	St Neots Town (England)	End of contract	Summer	n/a	
DF	(Scotland)	Robbie McIntyre	18	Huddersfield Town (England)	End of contract	Summer	n/a	
GK	(Scotland)	Sam George	17	Clyde	End of contract	Summer	n/a	
MF	(Scotland)	Rhys McCabe	19	Sheffield Wednesday (England)	Rejection to transfer	Summer	Undisclosed	
FW	(Nigeria)	Sone Aluko	23	Hull City (England)	Rejection to transfer	Summer	n/a	
DF	(Scotland)	Steven Whittaker	28	Norwich City (England)	Rejection to transfer	Summer	n/a	
FW	(Scotland)	Steven Naismith	25	Everton (England)	Rejection to transfer	Summer	n/a	
MF	(Scotland)	Jamie Ness	21	Stoke City (England)	Rejection to transfer	Summer	n/a	
FW	(Northern Ireland)	Kyle Lafferty	24	Sion (Switzerland)	Rejection to transfer	Summer	n/a	
GK	(Scotland)	Allan McGregor	30	Beşiktaş (Turkey)	Rejection to transfer	Summer	n/a	
MF	(Northern Ireland)	Steven Davis	27	Southampton (England)	Rejection to transfer	Summer	£0.8m	
MF	(Scotland)	John Fleck	20	Coventry City (England)	Rejection to transfer	Summer	Free	
DF	(Norway)	Tom Skogsrud	19	Sandefjord (Norway)	Rejection to transfer	Summer	n/a	
DF	(Norway)	Kim Skogsrud	19	Sandefjord (Norway)	Rejection to transfer	Summer	n/a	
MF	(Spain)	Juan Manuel Ortiz	30	Granada (Spain)	Contract terminated	Summer	n/a	
MF	(United States)	Alejandro Bedoya	25	Helsingborgs IF (Sweden)	Transfer	Summer	Free	
DF	(Romania)	Dorin Goian	31	Spezia (Italy)	Loan	Summer	n/a	
MF	(United States)	Maurice Edu	26	Stoke City (England)	Transfer	Summer	£0.3m	
DF	(Scotland)	Kirk Broadfoot	28	Blackpool (England)	Contract terminated	Summer	n/a	
DF	(United States)	Carlos Bocanegra	31	Racing Santander (Spain)	Loan	Summer	n/a	
DF	(Scotland)	Kyle McAusland	19	Ayr United	Loan	n/a	n/a	
FW	(England)	Kane Hemmings	21	Cowdenbeath	Loan	Winter	n/a	
FW	(Scotland)	Calum Gallagher	18	Alloa Athletic	Loan	Winter	n/a	
MF	(Australia)	Francesco Stella	21	Melbourne Victory (Australia)	Contract terminated	Winter	n/a	
MF	(Poland)	Kamil Wiktorski	19	Dolcan Ząbki (Poland)	Contract terminated	Winter	n/a	
MF	(Scotland)	Gregor Fotheringham	18	Forfar Athletic	Loan	Winter	n/a	
DF	(Scotland)	Stuart Urquhart	17	Dumbarton	Loan	n/a	n/a	
FW	(Scotland)	Kevin Kyle	31	Free agent	Contract terminated	n/a	n/a	
FW	(Spain)	Francisco Sandaza	28	Free agent	Contract terminated	n/a	n/a	

Last updated: 3 April 2013
Total income: £1.1m

==== New contracts ====
Pos.	Nat.	Name	Age	Status	Contract length	Expiry date	Source
GK	(Scotland)	Scott Gallacher	22	Signed	1 year	June 2013	
DF	(Northern Ireland)	Chris Hegarty	19	Signed	1 year	June 2013	
MF	(Northern Ireland)	Andrew Mitchell	20	Signed	1 year	June 2013	
FW	(Northern Ireland)	Andrew Little	23	Signed	2 years	June 2014	
MF	(Poland)	Kamil Wiktorski	19	Signed	1 year	June 2013	
MF	(Scotland)	Lewis Macleod	18	Signed	5 years	June 2017	
MF	(Scotland)	Barrie McKay	18	Signed	5 years	June 2017	
MF	(Scotland)	Robbie Crawford	19	Signed	5 years	June 2017	
DF	(Scotland)	Lee Wallace	25	Signed	5 years	June 2017	
MF	(Scotland)	Lee McCulloch	34	Signed	2 years	June 2015	
GK	(Scotland)	Neil Alexander	34	Rejected	1 year	June 2014	
MF	(Canada)	Fraser Aird	18	Signed	5 years	June 2018	
DF	(Scotland)	Kyle McAusland	20	Signed	2 years	June 2015	
DF	(Northern Ireland)	Chris Hegarty	20	Signed	2 years	June 2015	
FW	(Scotland)	Kal Naismith	20	Signed	2 years	June 2015	
DF	(Canada)	Luca Gasparotto	17	Signed	2 years	June 2015	
GK	(Scotland)	Scott Gallacher	23	Signed	2 years	June 2015	

Last updated: 18 February 2013

=== Squad statistics ===
			Total			Scottish Third Division		Scottish Cup		League Cup		Challenge Cup	
Pos.	Nat.	Name	Sts	App	Gls	App	Gls	App	Gls	App	Gls	App	Gls
GK	(Scotland)	Neil Alexander	47	47		36		4		4		3	
DF	(Greece)	Anestis Argyriou	24	27		20		3		3		1	
DF	(Scotland)	Kirk Broadfoot	5	5		2				1		2	
DF	(Scotland)	Darren Cole	1	4		3		1					
DF	(Romania)	Dorin Goian	4	4		2				1		1	
DF	(Brazil)	Emílson Cribari	32	34		26		3		3		2	
DF	(Northern Ireland)	Chris Hegarty	28	29		24		3		1		1	
DF	(United States)	Carlos Bocanegra	7	7		3				2		2	
DF	(Scotland)	Ross Perry	21	23		17		3		2		1	
DF	(Canada)	Luca Gasparotto	1	4		4							
DF	(France)	Sébastien Faure	16	23	1	18	1	2		2		1	
DF	(Scotland)	Lee Wallace	42	42	4	33	3	3		4	1	2	
MF	(Scotland)	David Templeton	25	26	15	24	15	2					
MF	(Scotland)	Lewis Macleod	31	31	3	21	3	3		4		3	
MF	(Scotland)	Kyle Hutton	30	33	2	27	2	2		3		1	
MF	(Scotland)	Ian Black	37	38	2	29	2	3		3		3	
MF	(Scotland)	Robbie Crawford	9	27	5	21	4	2	1	2		2	
MF	(Scotland)	Tom Walsh		1		1							
MF	(Scotland)	Andy Murdoch		1		1							
MF	(Northern Ireland)	Andrew Mitchell	4	7		7							
MF	(Canada)	Fraser Aird	11	22	3	19	3	2		1			
MF	(Scotland)	Barrie McKay	20	41	4	31	1	3	2	4		3	1
MF	(Scotland)	Danny Stoney		3		3							
MF	(Scotland)	Lee McCulloch	38	38	26	28	17	3	2	4	5	3	2
MF	(Northern Ireland)	Dean Shiels	27	29	12	21	7	3	3	4	2	1	
FW	(Northern Ireland)	Andrew Little	34	36	25	28	22	3		3	1	2	2
FW	(Scotland)	Kal Naismith	5	24	3	17	1	4	2			3	
FW	(Spain)	Francisco Sandaza	12	20	2	15	2	1		2		2	
FW	(Scotland)	Kevin Kyle	4	15	3	8	2	2	1	3		2	
FW	(England)	Kane Hemmings	2	5	1	5	1						

Last updated: 4 May 2013
Source: Wikipedia article
Ordered by position
0 shown as blank

=== Goal scorers ===
P	Nat.	Name	League	Scottish Cup	League Cup	Challenge Cup	Total
FW	(Scotland)	Lee McCulloch	17	2	5	2	26
FW	(Northern Ireland)	Andrew Little	22		1	2	25
MF	(Scotland)	David Templeton	15				15
MF	(Northern Ireland)	Dean Shiels	7	3	2		12
MF	(Scotland)	Robbie Crawford	4	1			5
MF	(Scotland)	Barrie McKay	1	2		1	4
DF	(Scotland)	Lee Wallace	3		1		4
FW	(Scotland)	Kal Naismith	1	2			3
FW	(Scotland)	Kevin Kyle	2	1			3
MF	(Scotland)	Lewis Macleod	3				3
MF	(Canada)	Fraser Aird	2				2
FW	(Spain)	Francisco Sandaza	2				2
MF	(Scotland)	Kyle Hutton	2				2
MF	(Scotland)	Ian Black	2				2
DF	(France)	Sébastien Faure	1				1
FW	(England)	Kane Hemmings	1				1
		Own goal	1				1

Last updated: 4 May 2013
Source: Match reports
Only competitive matches

=== Disciplinary record ===
P	Nat.	Name	YC	Yellow card Red card	RC
GK	(Scotland)	Neil Alexander	3		
DF	(France)	Sébastien Faure	2		
DF	(Romania)	Dorin Goian	1		
DF	(United States)	Carlos Bocanegra	1		
DF	(Brazil)	Emílson Cribari	5		
DF	(Scotland)	Lee Wallace	2		1
DF	(Northern Ireland)	Chris Hegarty	3		
DF	(Scotland)	Ross Perry	1		
DF	(Greece)	Anestis Argyriou	1		
MF	(Scotland)	Ian Black	13	2	
MF	(Scotland)	Lewis Macleod	2		
MF	(Scotland)	Lee McCulloch	9		
MF	(Scotland)	Kyle Hutton	9		
MF	(Canada)	Fraser Aird	2		
MF	(Northern Ireland)	Dean Shiels	2		
MF	(Scotland)	David Templeton	5		
MF	(Scotland)	Robbie Crawford	1		
MF	(Northern Ireland)	Andrew Mitchell	1		
FW	(Northern Ireland)	Andrew Little	4		
FW	(Spain)	Francisco Sandaza	1		
FW	(Scotland)	Kevin Kyle	2	1	
FW	(Scotland)	Kal Naismith	1		1

Last updated: 4 May 2013
Source: Match reports
Only competitive matches

=== Awards ===
P	Nat.	Name	Award	Date	From
FW	(Northern Ireland)	Andrew Little	Ginger Boot Winner	August	Scottish Football League
MF	(Scotland)	Lewis Macleod	Young Player of the Month	November	Scottish Football League
MAN	(Scotland)	Ally McCoist	Third Division Manager of the month	December	Scottish Football League
FW	(Northern Ireland)	Andrew Little	Ginger Boot Winner	February	Scottish Football League

== Club ==
=== Board of directors ===
Position	Staff
Chairman	(Scotland) Craig Whyte (until 14 May) (Scotland) Malcolm Murray (from 14 June)
Chief executive	(England) Charles Green (from 14 June) (until 19 April) (England) Craig Mather (interim from 24 April)
Chief Operating Officer	(England) Craig Mather (from 24 April)
Finance director	(England) Brian Stockbridge (from 14 June)
Non-executive director	(England) Imran Ahmad (from 14 June) (until 17 October)
Non-executive director	(Scotland) Walter Smith (from 11 November)
Non-executive director	(Scotland) Ian Hart (from 11 November)
Non-executive director	(England) Philip Cartmell (from 7 December)
Non-executive director	(England) Bryan Smart (from 7 December)

Source: Wikipedia article

=== Coaching staff ===
Position	Staff
Manager	(Scotland) Ally McCoist
Assistant manager	(Scotland) Kenny McDowall
First-team coach	(Scotland) Ian Durrant
Head of Sports Science	(Wales) Adam Owen
Goalkeepers coach	(Scotland) Jim Stewart

Source: Wikipedia article

=== Other staff ===
Position	Staff
Head of Football; Administration	(Scotland) Andrew Dickson
Head of Commercial	(England) Imran Ahmad (from 17 October) (until 27 April)
Head of Sports; Development	(England) Craig Mather (from 17 October) (until 24 April)
Head of Communications	(Scotland) Jim Traynor (from 8 December)
Physiotherapist	(Scotland) Philip Yeates (until 27 March) (England) Steve Walker
Doctor	(Scotland) Dr Paul Jackson
Chief scout	(Scotland) Neil Murray (until 2 April)
First-team scout	(Scotland) John Brown (until 27 June)
Masseur	(Scotland) Davie Lavey
Kit controller	(Scotland) Jimmy Bell
Video analyst	(Scotland) Steve Harvey

Source: Wikipedia article

== Matches ==
=== Scottish Third Division ===
Game	Date	Tournament	Round	Ground	Opponent	Score^{1}	Report
3	11 August 2012	Scottish Third Division	1	A	Peterhead	2–2	Report / Report link; Kick off / 12:45 BST; Attendance / 4,485; Referee / Stephen Finnie (Scotland); Peterhead / Rangers; 65' McAllister; 82' McLaughlin / 27' McKay; 90' Little
4	18 August 2012	Scottish Third Division	2	H	East Stirlingshire	5–1	Report / Report link; Kick off / 15:00 BST; Attendance / 49,118; Referee / Kevin Clancy (Scotland); Rangers / East Stirlingshire; 15' Little; 43' Little; 63' Sandaza; 73' Little; 90' McCulloch / 2' (pen.) Quinn
6	26 August 2012	Scottish Third Division	3	A	Berwick Rangers	1–1	Report / Report link; Kick off / 12:00 BST; Attendance / 4,140; Referee / Mike Tumilty (Scotland); Berwick Rangers / Rangers; 62' McLaren / 45+2' Little
8	2 September 2012	Scottish Third Division	4	H	Elgin City	5–1	Report / Report link; Kick off / 16:30 BST; Attendance / 46,015; Referee / David Somers (Scotland); Rangers / Elgin City; 24' Shiels; 29' Templeton; 45+2' McCulloch; 49' Templeton; 59' McCulloch / 15' Duff
9	15 September 2012	Scottish Third Division	5	A	Annan Athletic	0–0	Report / Report link; Kick off / 15:00 BST; Attendance / 2,517; Referee / Craig Charleston (Scotland)
11	23 September 2012	Scottish Third Division	6	H	Montrose	4–1	Report / Report link; Kick off / 15:00 BST; Attendance / 45,081; Referee / Stephen Finnie (Scotland); Rangers / Montrose; 27' Shiels; 55' Macleod; 60' McCulloch; 82' Crawford / 35' (o.g.) Argyriou
14	6 October 2012	Scottish Third Division	7	A	Stirling Albion	0–1	Report / Report link; Kick off / 15:00 BST; Attendance / 3,751; Referee / Bobby Madden (Scotland); Stirling Albion / Rangers; 9' Allison
15	20 October 2012	Scottish Third Division	8	H	Queen's Park	2–0	Report / Report link; Kick off / 15:00 BST; Attendance / 49,463; Referee / John Beaton (Scotland); Rangers / Queen's Park; 57' McCulloch; 90+1' McCulloch
16	28 October 2012	Scottish Third Division	9	A	Clyde	2–0	Report / Report link; Kick off / 12:45 GMT; Attendance / 7,500; Referee / Alan Muir (Scotland); Clyde / Rangers; (yellow card) 68' (red card) Neill / 17' Shiels; 80' McCulloch
19	10 November 2012	Scottish Third Division	10	H	Peterhead	2–0	Report / Report link; Kick off / 15:00 GMT; Attendance / 48,407; Referee / Craig Charleston (Scotland); Rangers / Peterhead; 43' McCulloch; 66' Wallace
20	17 November 2012	Scottish Third Division	11	AR	East Stirlingshire	6–2	Report / Report link; Kick off / 12:45 GMT; Attendance / 2,834; Referee / George Salmond (Scotland); East Stirlingshire / Rangers; (red card) 33' Züfle; 41' Turner; 58' (pen.) Quinn / 12' (pen.) McCulloch; 39' Little; 49' Wallace; 63' Kyle; 71' Naismith; 82' (pen.) McCulloch
22	8 December 2012	Scottish Third Division	14	H	Stirling Albion	2–0	Report / Report link; Kick off / 15:00 GMT; Attendance / 49,913; Referee / Mike Tumilty (Scotland); Rangers / Stirling Albion; 59' Templeton; 90' Little / (yellow card) 86' (red card) McSorley
23	15 December 2012	Scottish Third Division	15	A	Montrose	4–2	Report / Report link; Kick off / 12:30 GMT; Attendance / 4,205; Referee / Bobby Madden (Scotland); Montrose / Rangers; 16' Young; 75' Gray / 23' (pen.) McCulloch; 67' Kyle; 69' Shiels; 90+5' Crawford
24	18 December 2012	Scottish Third Division	13	H	Annan Athletic	3–0	Report / Report link; Kick off / 19:45 GMT; Attendance / 42,135; Referee / Paul Robertson (Scotland); Rangers / Annan Athletic; 29' Templeton; (red card) 59' Wallace; 64' Little; 70' Templeton
25	22 December 2012	Scottish Third Division	12	A	Elgin City	6–2	Report / Report link; Kick off / 12:30 GMT; Attendance / 3,448; Referee / Brian Colvin (Scotland); Elgin City / Rangers; 18' Moore; 32' Nicolson / 5' Little; 24' Little; 41' McCulloch; 60' McCulloch; 64' Macleod; 83' Hutton
26	26 December 2012	Scottish Third Division	16	H	Clyde	3–0	Report / Report link; Kick off / 15:00 GMT; Attendance / 47,463; Referee / Crawford Allan (Scotland); Rangers / Clyde; 21' Wallace; 38' Templeton; 76' Shiels
27	29 December 2012	Scottish Third Division	17	A	Queen's Park	1–0	Report / Report link; Kick off / 12:45 GMT; Attendance / 30,117; Referee / William Collum (Scotland); Queen's Park / Rangers; (yellow card) 56' (red card) Brough / 90+1' Aird
28	2 January 2013	Scottish Third Division	18	A	Annan Athletic	3–1	Report / Report link; Kick off / 12:45 GMT; Attendance / 2,441; Referee / Stephen Finnie (Scotland); Annan Athletic / Rangers; 35' Love / 26' Templeton; 63' Crawford; 83' Templeton
29	5 January 2013	Scottish Third Division	19	H	Elgin City	1–1	Report / Report link; Kick off / 15:00 GMT; Attendance / 46,406; Referee / John Beaton (Scotland); Rangers / Elgin City; 9' Macleod / (red card) 42' Harkins; 87' (o.g.) Alexander
30	12 January 2013	Scottish Third Division	20	H	Berwick Rangers	4–2	Report / Report link; Kick off / 15:00 GMT; Attendance / 44,976; Referee / Steven McLean (Scotland); Rangers / Berwick Rangers; 9' Little; 47' Little; 53' Templeton; 74' Little / 65' Gray; 73' McLaren
31	20 January 2013	Scottish Third Division	21	A	Peterhead	1–0	Report / Report link; Kick off / 12:00 GMT; Attendance / 4,855; Referee / Mike Tumilty (Scotland); Peterhead / Rangers; (yellow card) 65' (red card) McAllister / 30' Sandaza
32	26 January 2013	Scottish Third Division	22	H	Montrose	1–1	Report / Report link; Kick off / 15:00 GMT; Attendance / 46,273; Referee / Craig Charleston (Scotland); Rangers / Montrose; 45' (o.g.) Crawford / 89' Gray
34	9 February 2013	Scottish Third Division	24	H	Queen's Park	4–0	Report / Report link; Kick off / 15:00 GMT; Attendance / 46,104; Referee / George Salmond (Scotland); Rangers / Queen's Park; 50' Black; 63' Little; 78' Shiels; 89' Little
35	16 February 2013	Scottish Third Division	25	A	Clyde	4–1	Report / Report link; Kick off / 15:00 GMT; Attendance / 7,600; Referee / Kevin Clancy (Scotland); Clyde / Rangers; 47' Watt / 9' Little; 24' Little; 44' Templeton; 54' Templeton
36	23 February 2013	Scottish Third Division	26	A	Berwick Rangers	3–1	Report / Report link; Kick off / 12:00 GMT; Attendance / 4,476; Referee / Calum Murray (Scotland); Berwick Rangers / Rangers; 6' (o.g.) Argyriou / 9' (pen.) Shiels; 45+1' Little; 66' Faure
37	26 February 2013	Scottish Third Division	23	A	Stirling Albion	1–1	Report / Report link; Kick off / 19:45 GMT; Attendance / 3,707; Referee / Stephen Finnie (Scotland); Stirling Albion / Rangers; 51' Forsyth / 16' Little
38	2 March 2013	Scottish Third Division	27	H	East Stirlingshire	3–1	Report / Report link; Kick off / 12:00 GMT; Attendance / 44,534; Referee / Brian Colvin (Scotland); Rangers / East Stirlingshire; 51' Little; 61' McCulloch; 63' Little / 40' Stirling
39	9 March 2013	Scottish Third Division	28	H	Annan Athletic	1–2	Report / Report link; Kick off / 15:00 GMT; Attendance / 34,441; Referee / John McKendrick (Scotland); Rangers / Annan Athletic; 59' Little / 48' Love; 55' Hopkirk
40	16 March 2013	Scottish Third Division	29	A	Elgin City	1–0	Report / Report link; Kick off / 12:45 GMT; Attendance / 3,633; Referee / David Somers (Scotland); Elgin City / Rangers; / 73' (pen.) McCulloch; (yellow card) 87' (red card) Black
41	23 March 2013	Scottish Third Division	30	H	Stirling Albion	0–0	Report / Report link; Kick off / 12:00 GMT; Attendance / 44,608; Referee / Craig Thomson (Scotland)
42	30 March 2013	Scottish Third Division	31	A	Montrose	0–0	Report / Report link; Kick off / 12:00 GMT; Attendance / 4,686; Referee / Kevin Clancy (Scotland)
43	7 April 2013	Scottish Third Division	32	A	Queen's Park	4–1	Report / Report link; Kick off / 12:00 BST; Attendance / 11,492; Referee / Craig Charleston (Scotland); Queen's Park / Rangers; 87' Shankland / 18' Templeton; 35' Aird; 68' Hemmings; 86' Templeton
44	13 April 2013	Scottish Third Division	33	H	Clyde	2–0	Report / Report link; Kick off / 15:00 BST; Attendance / 44,453; Referee / Calum Murray (Scotland); Rangers / Clyde; 55' McCulloch; 89' Hutton
45	20 April 2013	Scottish Third Division	34	H	Peterhead	1–2	Report / Report link; Kick off / 15:00 BST; Attendance / 43,961; Referee / Euan Norris (Scotland); Rangers / Peterhead; 12' McCulloch / 23' Ross; 56' McAllister
46	27 April 2013	Scottish Third Division	35	AR	East Stirlingshire	4–2	Report / Report link; Kick off / 12:45 BST; Attendance / 2,885; Referee / Barry Cook (Scotland); East Stirlingshire / Rangers; 22' (pen.) Quinn; (red card) 30' Turner; 50' Quinn / 6' Crawford; 45+3' Templeton; 65' Black; 79' Templeton
47	4 May 2013	Scottish Third Division	36	H	Berwick Rangers	1–0	Report / Report link; Kick off / 12:45 BST; Attendance / 50,048; Referee / John McKendrick (Scotland); Rangers / Berwick Rangers; 32' Aird

Last updated: 4 May 2013
Source: Wikipedia article
^{1}Rangers goals come first.
National flags for Ground and Opponent columns are only shown when different from that of Rangers.
M = Match; Ground: H = Home, A = Away, N = Neutral, HR = Home replacement, AR = Away replacement.

=== Scottish Cup ===
Game	Date	Tournament	Round	Ground	Opponent	Score^{1}	Report
13	29 September 2012	Scottish Cup	R2	A	Forres Mechanics	1–0	Report / Report link; Kick off / 15:00 BST; Attendance / 2,751; Referee / Crawford Allan (Scotland); Forres Mechanics / Rangers; / 16' Naismith
18	3 November 2012	Scottish Cup	R3	H	Alloa Athletic	7–0	Report / Report link; Kick off / 15:00 GMT; Attendance / 25,478; Referee / Iain Brines (Scotland); Rangers / Alloa Athletic; 2' Shiels; 21' Shiels; 33' McCulloch; 72' McCulloch; 73' Crawford; 82' McKay; 89' McKay / (red card) 78' James Doyle
21	2 December 2012	Scottish Cup	R4	H	Elgin City	3–0	Report / Report link; Kick off / 13:15 GMT; Attendance / 23,195; Referee / Euan Norris (Scotland); Rangers / Elgin City; 43' Shiels; 68' Kyle; 85' Naismith
33	2 February 2013	Scottish Cup	R5	A	Dundee United	0–3	Report / Report link; Kick off / 12:45 GMT; Attendance / 9,564; Referee / Euan Norris (Scotland); Dundee United / Rangers; 1' Russell; 36' Daly; 79' Russell / (red card) 86' Naismith; (yellow card) 88' (red card) Black

Last updated: 2 February 2013
Source: Wikipedia article
^{1}Rangers goals come first.
National flags for Ground and Opponent columns are only shown when different from that of Rangers.
M = Match; Ground: H = Home, A = Away, N = Neutral, HR = Home replacement, AR = Away replacement.

=== League Cup ===
Game	Date	Tournament	Round	Ground	Opponent	Score^{1}	Report
2	7 August 2012	League Cup	R1	H	East Fife	4–0	Report / Report link; Kick off / 19:45 BST; Attendance / 38,160; Referee / John McKendrick (Scotland); Rangers / East Fife; 15' McCulloch; 33' Shiels; 47' Wallace; 62' McCulloch
7	30 August 2012	League Cup	R2	H	Falkirk	3–0	Report / Report link; Kick off / 19:45 BST; Attendance / 26,450; Referee / Alan Muir (Scotland); Rangers / Falkirk; 18' McCulloch; 32' Little; 52' McCulloch
12	26 September 2012	League Cup	R3	H	Motherwell	2–0	Report / Report link; Kick off / 19:15 BST; Attendance / 29,413; Referee / Calum Murray (Scotland); Rangers / Motherwell; 50' McCulloch; 56' Shiels
17	31 October 2012	League Cup	QF	H	Inverness Caledonian Thistle	0–3	Report / Report link; Kick off / 19:45 GMT; Attendance / 28,033; Referee / Steven McLean (Scotland); Rangers / Inverness Caledonian Thistle; / 27' Shinnie; 59' Warren; 79' (pen.) Shinnie

Last updated: 26 September 2012
Source: Wikipedia article
^{1}Rangers goals come first.
National flags for Ground and Opponent columns are only shown when different from that of Rangers.
M = Match; Ground: H = Home, A = Away, N = Neutral, HR = Home replacement, AR = Away replacement.

=== Challenge Cup ===
Game	Date	Tournament	Round	Ground	Opponent	Score^{1}	Report
1	29 July 2012	Challenge Cup	R1	A	Brechin City	2–1	Report / Report link; Kick off / 15:05 BST; Attendance / 4,123; Referee / George Salmond (Scotland); Brechin City / Rangers; 43' Jackson / 4' Little; 102' McCulloch
5	21 August 2012	Challenge Cup	R2	A	Falkirk	1–0	Report / Report link; Kick off / 19:45 BST; Attendance / 6,747; Referee / Calum Murray (Scotland); Falkirk / Rangers; / 45' Little
10	18 September 2012	Challenge Cup	QF	H	Queen of the South	2–2 (3-4 pen.)	Report / Report link; Kick off / 19:45 BST; Attendance / 23,932; Referee / Stevie O'Reilly (Scotland); Rangers / Queen of the South; 55' McKay; (yellow card) 66' (red card) Kyle; 72' (pen.) McCulloch / 49' Clark; (yellow card) 90+2' (red card) Gibson; 90+4' Reilly

Last updated: 29 July 2012
Source: Wikipedia article
^{1}Rangers goals come first.
National flags for Ground and Opponent columns are only shown when different from that of Rangers.
M = Match; Ground: H = Home, A = Away, N = Neutral, HR = Home replacement, AR = Away replacement.

=== Friendlies ===
Game

1
Date

10 April 2013
Tournament

Friendly
Round

Ground

H
Opponent

Linfield
Score^{1}

2–0
Report

Report	Report link
Kick off	19:15 BST
Attendance	12,543
Referee	John Beattie (Scotland)
Rangers	Linfield
40' Hegarty; 89' Murdoch

Last updated: 10 April 2013
Source: Wikipedia article
^{1}Rangers goals come first.
National flags for Ground and Opponent columns are only shown when different from that of Rangers.
M = Match; Ground: H = Home, A = Away, N = Neutral, HR = Home replacement, AR = Away replacement.

== Competitions ==
=== Overall ===
Competition	Started round	Current position / round	Final position / round	First match	Last match
Scottish Third Division	—	—	1st	11 August	4 May
Challenge Cup	1st Round	—	Quarter-finals	29 July	18 September
League Cup	1st Round	—	Quarter-finals	7 August	31 October
Scottish Cup	2nd Round	—	5th Round	29 September	2 February

Source: Competitions

=== Scottish Third Division ===
==== Standings ====
Pos	Team	Pld	W	D	L	GF	GA	GD	Pts	Promotion or qualification
1	Rangers (C, P)	36	25	8	3	87	29	+58	83	Promotion to League One
2	Peterhead	36	17	8	11	52	28	+24	59	Qualification for the Second Division Play-offs
3	Queen's Park	36	16	8	12	60	54	+6	56	Qualification for the Second Division Play-offs
4	Berwick Rangers	36	14	7	15	59	55	+4	49	Qualification for the Second Division Play-offs
5	Elgin City	36	13	10	13	67	69	−2	49	

Source: SPFL archive
Rules for classification: 1) points; 2) goal difference; 3) number of goals scored.
(C) Champions; (P) Promoted

==== Results summary ====
Overall								Home						Away					
Pld	W	D	L	GF	GA	GD	Pts	W	D	L	GF	GA	GD	W	D	L	GF	GA	GD
36	25	8	3	87	29	+58	83	13	3	2	44	12	+32	12	5	1	43	17	+26

Last updated: 3 May 2013.
Source: Wikipedia article

==== Results by round ====
Round	1	2	3	4	5	6	7	8	9	10	11	12	13	14	15	16	17	18	19	20	21	22	23	24	25	26	27	28	29	30	31	32	33	34	35	36
Ground	A	H	A	H	A	H	A	H	A	H	A	A	H	H	A	H	A	A	H	H	A	H	A	H	A	A	H	H	A	H	A	A	H	H	A	H
Result	D	W	D	W	D	W	L	W	W	W	W	W	W	W	W	W	W	W	D	W	W	D	D	W	W	W	W	L	W	D	D	W	W	L	W	W
Position	5	1	4	3	4	2	4	1	1	1	1	1	1	1	1	1	1	1	1	1	1	1	1	1	1	1	1	1	1	1	1	1	1	1	1	1

Updated to match(es) played on 22 April 2013. Source: 2012–13 Scottish Third Division
A = Away; H = Home; W = Win; D = Draw; L = Loss
