= Francisco Sandaza =

Spanish footballer

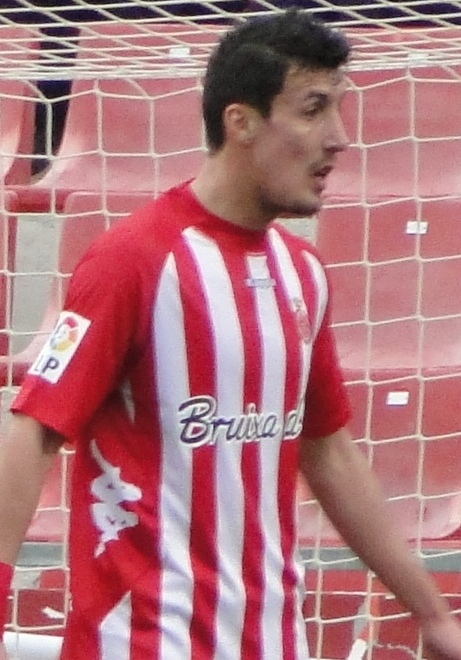
- Sandaza with Girona in 2015

Personal information
- Full name: Francisco José Sandaza Asensio
- Date of birth: 30 November 1984 (age 41)
- Place of birth: Toledo, Spain
- Height: 1.88 m (6 ft 2 in)
- Position: Striker

Youth career
- Leganés
- Coslada

Senior career*
Years	Team	Apps	(Gls)
2003–2004	Toledo B		
2004	Toledo	7	(1)
2004–2008	Valencia B	36	(23)
2005	→ Onda (loan)	12	(4)
2006–2007	→ Puçol (loan)	20	(15)
2008–2010	Dundee United	38	(11)
2010–2011	Brighton & Hove Albion	19	(4)
2011–2012	St Johnstone	27	(23)
2012–2013	Rangers	14	(3)
2013–2014	Lugo	26	(10)
2014–2015	Girona	38	(16)
2015–2016	FC Tokyo	8	(2)
2016–2018	Girona	34	(9)
2017	→ Al Ahli (loan)	0	(0)
2018	Qingdao Huanghai	12	(5)
2019–2020	Alcorcón	31	(4)
2020–2021	Hyderabad	11	(4)
2021–2022	Extremadura	8	(0)
- * Club domestic league appearances and goals

Francisco "Fran" José Sandaza Asensio (Spanish pronunciation: [fɾanˈθisko sanˈdaθa]; born 30 November 1984) is a Spanish former professional footballer who played as a striker.

He achieved Segunda División totals of 127 games and 34 goals for Lugo, Girona and Alcorcón, but spent most of his career abroad. He represented Dundee United, St Johnstone and Rangers in Scotland, in addition to brief spells in England, Qatar, Japan, China and India.

== Career ==
=== Valencia B ===
Sandaza joined Valencia in 2002 and played in the Primera División outfit's reserve team. Before, Sandaza played on loan in UD Puçol in the Tercera División (his coach that year in UD Puçol was Luis Milla). He considered leaving full-time football to become a police officer. Sandaza is also good friend with Valencia's teammate and now Inter Miami player Jordi Alba, during his time at Valencia B.

=== Dundee United ===
On 11 July 2008, Sandaza instead signed for Scottish Premier League side Dundee United, making his league début exactly a month later. After scoring three goals in pre-season, he scored his first competitive goal for the club in the 1–1 draw against Celtic on 17 August 2008. In September, Sandaza scored his second and netted four times in the first half of November, including a double against eventual champions, Rangers. Injury halted Sandaza's progress towards the end of the year and he didn't score again until late February, scoring three more times in March. In his first season in Scotland, Sandaza scored ten league goals, with five coming against the Old Firm.

A groin injury prevented Sandaza from starting the 2009–10 season, with a November operation likely to see him return by the end of 2009. Hernia problems restricted his appearances during the season, and he was struggling to get into the United first team so in August 2010 was allowed to go on trial with Swansea City. Sandaza was eventually released by United on 31 August, allowing him to sign for another club as a free agent after the closure of the transfer window. During his time at Dundee United, Sandaza earned a nickname "Braveheart" by the club's supporters.

=== Brighton & Hove Albion ===
Sandaza signed for Brighton & Hove Albion under their new manager Gus Poyet. Sandaza made his debut for the club, coming on for Glenn Murray in the 69th minute, in a 2–0 win over Plymouth Argyle. A few weeks later, Sandaza scored his first goal, a winning goal in a 2–1 win over Oldham Athletic. In the FA Cup campaign, Sandaza scored two goals in two consecutive games, in separate round victories against United of Manchester and Portsmouth. Two months later, on 22 February 2011, he scored again, but this time it's against Plymouth (the team he made his debut against). However, his time at Brighton was limited after his first team was he was surplus to requirements, due to goalscoring form of Ashley Barnes and Glenn Murray. At the end of the season, the club would get promoted to the Championship.

In May 2011 the club announced that he would be released at the end of the season following the ending of his current contract, along with five other players.

=== St Johnstone ===
On 25 July 2011, Sandaza signed a one-year deal with St Johnstone. Sandaza scored 12 goals in his first 17 appearances for St Johnstone, which prompted the club to offer him an extended contract. Due to his goalscoring form for St Johnstone, Rangers made a pre-contract offer for Sandaza as his contract was set to expire at the end of the season. Sandaza eventually rejected Rangers' offers, claiming he did not want to be a 'cheap' option. Following his decision to reject the move, the Glasgow club entered administration, leading Sandaza to say he was relieved to have turned down a pre-contract deal, while acknowledging his sympathy for Rangers' plight. Sandaza became a free agent after announcing he was leaving the club.

"It was really disappointing and not the way I wanted to say goodbye. We had a couple of chances in the first-half and I had one later. My dad saw it on television in Spain and said my goal was onside and should have counted.It was my last game for St Johnstone and I wanted to say goodbye with a goal. It has been a very successful year for myself and for the club. When I came here the objective was to get into the top six and we have done that. Derek McInnnes and Steve Lomas are both good managers and I am grateful to them for giving me my chance. I also want to thank the club and the supporters. I will always love the club and who knows, maybe I will come back one day. Never say never."

— Sandaza on leaving the club.

=== Rangers ===
On 7 August 2012, Sandaza signed a three-year deal with Rangers, who were in the Scottish Third Division after being liquidated and a new club formed. On 18 August, Sandaza scored his first Rangers goal and provided a double assist in front of a 49,118 crowd at Ibrox, as Rangers won 5–1 against East Stirlingshire. On 20 January, Sandaza scored his second Rangers goal away to Peterhead to give the light blues a 1–0 victory. In September, Sandaza soon suffered an injury on a cheekbone and was taken to hospital for an X-ray after clashed heads with Motherwell's Shaun Hutchinson in the Scottish League Cup, which Rangers won 2–0. His injury was estimated to rule him out for eight weeks, with possibilities of being out for the rest of the year.

In December 2012, Sandaza alleged to Spanish newspaper Diario AS that Rangers – a club with a strong Protestant identity – had told him to stop making the Catholic sign of the cross. The club denied these allegations, pointing out that former club icons Lorenzo Amoruso and Shota Arveladze crossed themselves regularly.

In March 2013, Sandaza was duped into discussing a possible transfer from Rangers to the Major League Soccer by a hoax telephone caller posing as a football agent. The caller was a supporter of Rangers' rival Celtic FC. Sandaza admitted to the hoax caller that he was only at Rangers for the money and would leave if an alternative offer was made, suitable for the club as well. His comments resulted in his being suspended by the club following a decision and an immediate investigation into the comment. He did not appear in training or play for the club again after that incident. During his suspension, Sandaza feared his Rangers career might be over as he suspected that club owner Charles Green wished to sell him. That fear was proven correct as the club, after an investigation into the 'hoax agent' incident, terminated his contract subject to the right of appeal. Following his release, Mark Hateley wrote in the Daily Record and spoke negatively about Sandaza, but stated that Sandaza leaving would be like a new signing.

Shortly after his release, Sandaza attempted to sue the club over this breach of contract. On 18 July 2013, Sandaza dropped his lawsuit against the club and the hoaxer.

=== Lugo ===
After leaving Rangers, Sandaza went on trial in Romania at Liga I club Petrolul Ploiești, but was not offered a contract and returned to Spain. On 18 July 2013, Sandaza signed a contract with CD Lugo, returning to Spain after five years abroad. Upon joining the club, Sandaza expected to score many goals ahead of the new season.

Sandaza made his Lugo debut, in the opening game of the season, playing 90 minutes, in a 0–0 draw against Numancia. Sandaza scored in the next game on 24 August 2013, in a 2–1 loss against Barcelona B. His second goal then came on 21 September 2013, in a 1–0 win over Tenerife. His third goal later came on 12 October 2013, in a 1–0 win over Córdoba. Sandaza later scored fourth and fifth goals against Alcorcón and Alavés.

However, Sandaza suffered a muscle injury, sprained ankle and muscle tear during the season. Despite the injuries, Sandaza made twenty-seven appearances and scoring five times in all competitions. It was announced on 14 June 2014 that Sandaza was released by the club.

=== Girona ===
On 17 July 2014, Sandaza joined Girona on a one-year contract.

After being on the bench in the opening game of the season against Racing de Santander, Sandaza scored two goals in two games against Alcorcón (which was his debut) and Tenerife. By the end of 2014, Sandaza scored five more goals against Ponferradina, Mirandés, Leganés and Alavés.

Later in the 2014–15 season, Sandaza later scored nine more goals against Lugo, Alcorcón, Numancia, Leganés, Recreativo de Huelva, FC Barcelona B, Llagostera, Mallorca and Lugo.

In his first season at Girona, Sandaza made forty-two appearances and scoring sixteen times in all competitions.

=== Later career ===
On 8 July 2015, Sandaza moved joined J1 League side FC Tokyo.

On 8 July 2016, after being sparingly used at FC Tokyo, Sandaza returned to Girona after agreeing to a two-year contract. Roughly one year later he was loaned to Al Ahli SC; after sustaining an injury which took him out of the first matches of the campaign, he was unable to play until January due to being unregistered.

On 5 February 2018, Sandaza terminated his contract with the Blanquivermells, and subsequently joined China's Qingdao Huanghai FC. He returned to Spain on 18 December 2018, after agreeing to a two-and-a-half-year contract with Alcorcón.

On 15 September 2020, Sandaza terminated his contract with Alkor. Days later, he signed a one-year deal with Indian Super League club Hyderabad FC.

== Personal life ==
Toward the end of the 2011–12 season, Sandaza was banned from driving after admitting to being more than twice the legal limit when he was caught driving the wrong way down a one-way street in Perth. After initially letting him go, police became concerned about the way he drove off and pulled him over again a short time later to perform a breathalyzer test. At Perth Sheriff Court, Sandaza was given a 16-month driving ban and fined £550.

== Club statistics ==
As of 18 December 2021

Club	Season	League			National Cup		League Cup		Continental		Other		Total	
Club	Season	Division	Apps	Goals	Apps	Goals	Apps	Goals	Apps	Goals	Apps	Goals	Apps	Goals
Dundee United	2008–09	Scottish Premier League	31	10	1	0	3	0	—		—		35	10
Dundee United	2009–10	Scottish Premier League	7	1	1	0	0	0	—		—		8	1
Dundee United	Total		38	11	2	0	3	0	—		—		43	11
Brighton & Hove Albion	2010–11	League One	15	2	4	2	0	0	—		—		19	4
St Johnstone	2011–12	Scottish Premier League	26	14	3	1	2	3	—		—		31	18
Rangers	2012–13	Scottish Third Division	14	2	1	0	2	0	—		2	0	19	2
Lugo	2013–14	Segunda División	26	5	1	0	—		—		—		27	5
Girona	2014–15	Segunda División	36	16	0	0	—		—		2	0	38	16
FC Tokyo	2015	J1 League	8	0	0	0	1	0	—		—		9	0
FC Tokyo	2016	J1 League	1	0	—		—		1	0	—		2	0
FC Tokyo	Total		9	0	0	0	1	0	1	0	—		11	0
Girona	2016–17	Segunda División	34	9	1	0	—		—		—		35	9
Al Ahli (loan)	2017–18	Qatar Stars League	0	0	0	0	—		—		—		0	0
Qingdao Huanghai	2018	China League One	12	5	0	0	—		—		—		12	5
Alcorcón	2018–19	Segunda División	10	1	—		—		—		—		10	1
Alcorcón	2019–20	Segunda División	21	3	1	0	—		—		—		22	3
Alcorcón	Total		31	4	1	0	—		—		—		32	4
Hyderabad	2020–21	Indian Super League	11	4	—		—		—		—		11	4
Extremadura	2021–22	Primera Federación	8	0	0	0	—		—		—		8	0
Career total			260	72	13	3	8	3	1	0	4	0	286	78

== Honours ==
Valencia Mestalla

- Tercera División: 2004–05

Brighton & Hove Albion

- Football League One: 2010–11

Rangers

- Scottish Third Division: 2012–13
