= Chris Hegarty (footballer, born 1992) =

Northern Irish footballer

Personal information
- Date of birth: 13 August 1992 (age 34)
- Place of birth: Dungannon, Northern Ireland
- Height: 5 ft 11 in (1.80 m)
- Position: Defender

Youth career
- 2006–2008: Dungannon Swifts
- 2008–2010: Millwall
- 2010–2011: Rangers

Senior career*
Years	Team	Apps	(Gls)
2011–2014	Rangers	25	(1)
2014–2016	Linfield	17	(3)
2016	→ Dungannon Swifts (loan)	13	(0)
2016–2019	Dungannon Swifts	95	(11)
2019–2023	Crusaders	85	(5)
2023-2024	Dungannon Swifts	14	(0)
Total		249	(20)

International career
2010–2011	Northern Ireland U19	8	(0)
2013	Northern Ireland U21	4	(0)
- * Club domestic league appearances and goals as of 7 June 2024

Chris Hegarty (born 13 August 1992) is a Northern Irish footballer who played as a defender.

== Club career ==
Born in Dungannon, Hegarty began his career at youth level with local team Dungannon Swifts. He joined Millwall in 2008 after being scouted playing for the Northern Ireland under-16 team. He captained both the youth and reserve teams (winning the youth league in the process), before joining Hibernian on trial in 2010. He was offered contracts by both Hibs and fellow Scottish Premier League side Rangers, and opted to sign for the latter, revealing "I fulfilled an ambition by playing for the club I grew up supporting".

=== Rangers ===
Although he made several appearances on the substitutes bench in the 2011–12 season, it was not until May 2012 that he made his first-team appearance, in a friendly against Linfield in May 2012. In the summer of 2012, Hegarty became the first player to sign for Rangers after their demotion to the fourth tier of Scottish football. He made 28 appearances in total during the 2012–13 season as Rangers won the Scottish Third Division. He scored his first Rangers goal in the opening game of the 2013–14 season, tapping in after two minutes in a 4–1 win over Brechin City. His season was blighted by injury however, and he would make just one other appearance that season.

=== Linfield ===
In May 2014 Hegarty signed for Linfield on a two-year contract. He was also made club captain. However his time there was blighted by injuries, and in February 2016 he joined hometown club Dungannon Swifts on loan for the remainder of the 2015–16 season.

=== Dungannon Swifts ===
Hegarty signed for Dungannon permanently in May 2016. In February 2018, he helped the Swifts to win the Northern Ireland Football League Cup (their first senior trophy), after a 3–1 victory over Ballymena United in the final. Hegarty was made Dungannon captain in December 2018.

=== Crusaders ===
In May 2019, Hegarty joined Crusaders on a three-year deal. He scored on his competitive debut, a 2–0 victory against B36 Tórshavn in the UEFA Europa League.

== International career ==
Hegarty won eight caps for Northern Ireland at under-19 level and four caps at under-21 level.

== Career statistics ==
As of 7 May 2023

Club	Season	Division	League		Cup		League Cup		Europe		Other		Total	
Club	Season	Division	Apps	Goals	Apps	Goals	Apps	Goals	Apps	Goals	Apps	Goals	Apps	Goals
Rangers	2011–12	Premier League	0	0	0	0	0	0	0	0	0	0	0	0
Rangers	2012–13	Third Division	24	0	3	0	1	0	–		1	0	29	0
Rangers	2013–14	League One	1	1	0	0	1	0	–		0	0	2	1
Rangers	Total		25	1	3	0	2	0	0	0	1	0	31	1
Linfield	2014–15	Premiership	14	3	0	0	1	0	4	0	1	0	20	3
Linfield	2015–16	Premiership	3	0	1	0	2	0	4	0	1	0	11	0
Linfield	Total		17	3	1	0	3	0	8	0	2	0	31	3
Dungannon Swifts	2015–16	Premiership	13	0	0	0	0	0	–		0	0	13	0
Dungannon Swifts	2016–17	Premiership	32	5	2	0	2	0	–		0	0	36	5
Dungannon Swifts	2017–18	Premiership	30	5	1	0	3	0	–		0	0	34	5
Dungannon Swifts	2018–19	Premiership	33	1	2	0	2	0	–		0	0	37	1
Dungannon Swifts	Total		108	11	5	0	7	0	0	0	0	0	120	11
Crusaders	2019–20	Premiership	15	1	0	0	0	0	4	1	0	0	19	2
Crusaders	2020–21	Premiership	25	2	0	0	–		–		2	0	27	2
Crusaders	2021–22	Premiership	17	0	1	0	2	0	–		2	1	22	1
Crusaders	2022–23	Premiership	27	2	2	0	1	0	3	0	1	0	34	2
Crusaders	Total		84	5	3	0	3	0	7	1	5	1	102	7
Career total			251	28	11	0	16	3	11	1	2	0	291	32

== Honours ==
Rangers

- Scottish Third Division: 2012–13

Dungannon Swifts

- Northern Ireland Football League Cup: 2017–18

Crusaders

- Irish Cup: 2021–22, 2022–23
- NIFL Charity Shield: 2022
