= Ian Black (footballer, born 1985) =

Scottish footballer (born 1985)

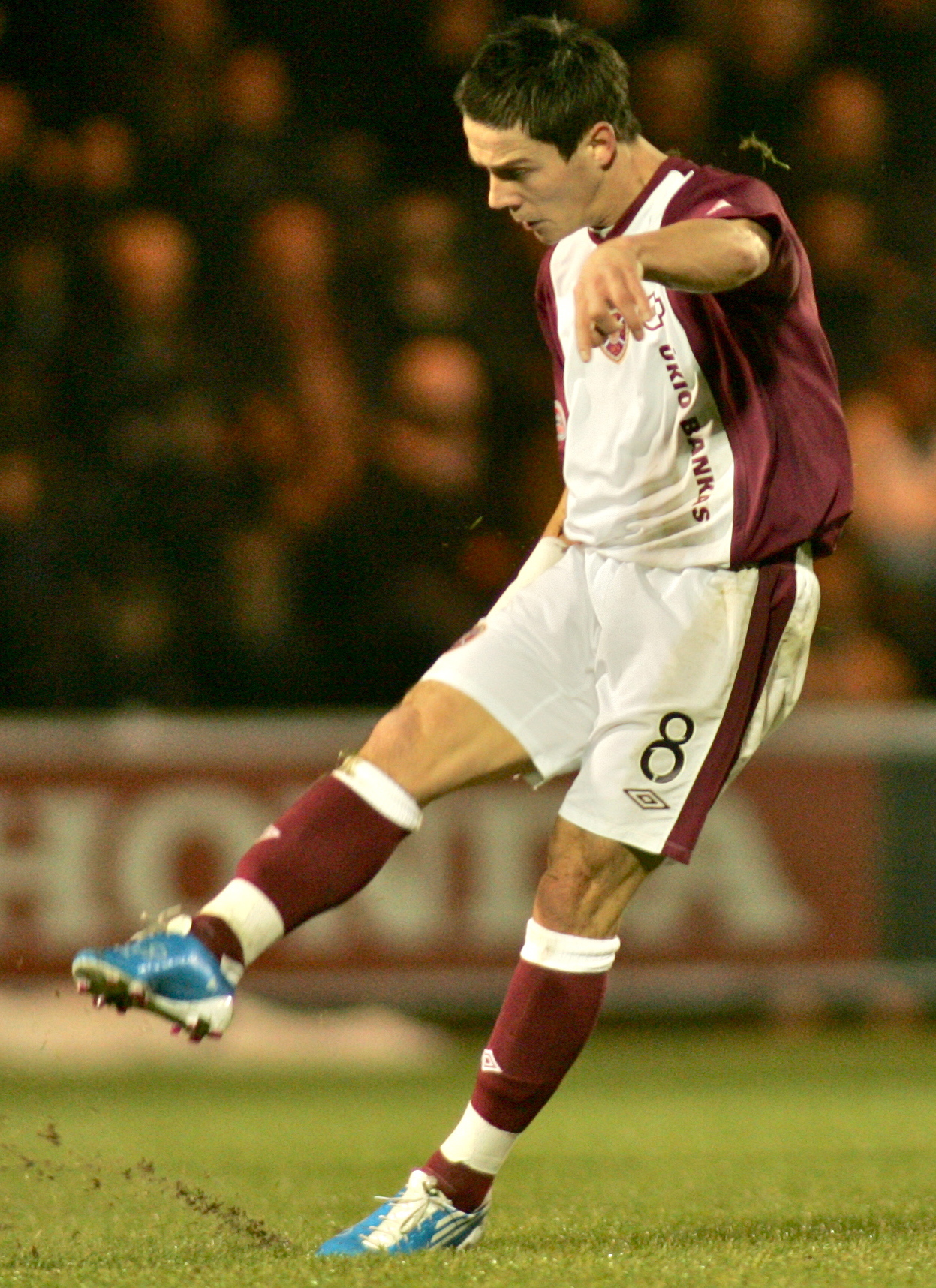
- Black with Heart of Midlothian in 2010

Personal information
- Full name: Ian Kenneth Black
- Date of birth: 14 March 1985 (age 41)
- Place of birth: Edinburgh, Scotland
- Height: 5 ft 8 in (1.73 m)
- Position: Central midfielder

Youth career
- Tranent Boys Club
- Tynecastle Boys Club
- Hibernian
- 2003–2004: Blackburn Rovers

Senior career*
Years	Team	Apps	(Gls)
2004–2009	Inverness Caledonian Thistle	132	(8)
2009–2012	Heart of Midlothian	87	(4)
2012–2015	Rangers	83	(5)
2015–2017	Shrewsbury Town	49	(4)
2017	Blackpool	10	(0)
2017	Skelmersdale United	1	(0)
2017	Chorley	2	(0)
2018–2020	Tranent Juniors		
2020–2021	Dunbar United		

International career
2005–2009	Scotland B	2	(0)
2012	Scotland	1	(0)
Medal record
Hearts
Winner	Scottish Cup	2012
Rangers
Winner	Scottish Third Division	2013
Winner	Scottish League One	2014
- * Club domestic league appearances and goals

Ian Kenneth Black (born 14 March 1985) is a Scottish former professional footballer who played as a central midfielder. His clubs included Inverness Caledonian Thistle, Heart of Midlothian, Rangers, Shrewsbury Town and Blackpool. Black made one appearance for the Scotland national team in August 2012, despite playing in the Scottish Third Division for Rangers at that time.

== Club career ==
=== Early career ===
Black began as a youth player with Tranent Boys Club. He was also a youth player at Hibernian, where he played alongside Scott Brown. Black first signed a professional contract with English Premier League club Blackburn Rovers, but he did not play for their first team.

=== Inverness Caledonian Thistle ===
After being released by Blackburn, Black joined Inverness Caledonian Thistle in July 2004. Black made his debut as a substitute on 7 August 2004 against Livingston, with his first start coming on 9 April 2005 against Kilmarnock at Rugby Park. In his first season, he made 13 appearances.

He scored his first goal for the club on 5 November 2005 with a fifth-minute strike against Dunfermline. The following season on 30 December 2006 he was sent off for a second bookable offence against Falkirk.

He made 132 league appearances for Caley, and scored eight goals. His last game for Inverness was against Falkirk in a 1–0 loss for Inverness, which saw them relegated to the Scottish First Division.

=== Heart of Midlothian ===
It was reported in The Scotsman newspaper on 24 December 2008 that Black had agreed in principle to sign a pre-contract agreement to join boyhood heroes Heart of Midlothian in the summer of 2009. Hearts confirmed that he had signed the agreement on 28 December and would join up with the club for the 2009–10 season. On 2 July 2009, Black finally signed for Hearts after signing a pre-contract agreement in December 2008, marking a return to the club he once served as a ball boy. He made his debut on 17 August 2009 as a substitute against Dundee United at Tannadice, with his first start coming on 23 August against Rangers. He scored his first goal for Hearts on 13 February 2010 with a long-range effort against Falkirk in a 3–2 win. In his first season with the club he made 32 appearances in all competitions, scoring once.

Early in the 2010–11 season, Black was criticised by Rangers player Nikica Jelavić, who claimed that Black had intentionally injured him during a match. Black apologised for injuring Jelavic. On 7 August 2011, he was sent off for challenge on Keith Lasley, who was also sent off later in the same match. Hearts eventually lost 1–0 to Lasley's club Motherwell. He was sent off again against Kilmarnock on 29 October 2011. On 14 January 2012 he was given a yellow card for an attempted trip on Paul McGowan, invoking a ban because he went over the points threshold. This prompted his manager to comment that he was being booked because of his reputation rather than the incidents.

In December 2011, with Hearts having problems paying wages, it was reported that Black had taken a part-time job as a painter. At half time in the match against Dunfermline on 17 December the stadium announcer played Paint It Black by the Rolling Stones and after the Edinburgh Derby on 2 January 2012 he revealed a T-shirt with the message "I'll paint this place maroon" in reference to his part-time job. On 30 April 2012, Hearts announced that Black would leave Hearts in the summer. Black helped Hearts win the 2011–12 Scottish Cup, defeating Hibernian 5–1 in the 2012 Scottish Cup Final.

=== Rangers ===
It was reported on 4 July 2012 that Black had agreed a deal in principle to sign for Rangers, depending on which division of the Scottish Football League the club was admitted to. On 24 July 2012 he began a trial training spell with the club. It was announced on 28 July that Black had signed a three-year deal with Rangers subject to clearance. He made his debut for Rangers as a trialist on 29 July against Brechin City in the first round of the Scottish Challenge Cup, Rangers won the match 2–1. Black scored his first Rangers goal in a 4–0 victory against Queens Park on 9 February 2013.

In September 2013, Black was suspended and fined £7,500 after admitting breaches of Scottish Football Association rules in relation to betting on matches.

Black was released by Rangers at the end of the 2014–15 season.

=== Shrewsbury Town ===
Following unsuccessful trial spells at Berwick Rangers and Raith Rovers, Black signed for English League One club Shrewsbury Town in September 2015. He made his debut in a second-round tie of the Football League Trophy against Fleetwood Town the following month, and scored his first goal for the club in a 4–2 victory over Sheffield United at Bramall Lane in November. Black played regularly for the remainder of the season, helping Shrewsbury avoid relegation and also reach the fifth-round of the FA Cup, although he had a poor disciplinary record, picking up 13 yellow and 2 red cards in less than seven months. Featuring only sporadically at the beginning of the following season, Black scored his second Shrewsbury goal in a 1–1 draw against AFC Wimbledon in September 2016, He left Shrewsbury on 31 January 2017, after having his contract cancelled by mutual consent.

=== Blackpool ===
In February 2017 Black joined League Two side Blackpool on a contract until the end of the season. He was released in May 2017, after making 10 appearances for the club.

=== Later career ===
Black joined Northern Premier League side Skelmersdale United in October 2017. He moved on to National League North side Chorley at the end of October. Black signed for Scottish junior club Tranent in January 2018, then joined East of Scotland League Premier Division club Dunbar United in March 2020.

== International career ==
Black represented Scotland B in the 2005 Future Cup, in a 3–2 defeat by Turkey B. After a four-year absence he was included in the Scotland B squad for their game against Northern Ireland.

In 2012, despite playing in the fourth tier of Scottish football, Black was called up to the Scotland squad for a friendly against Australia. He came on as a substitute late in the game.

== Personal life ==
Black's father, also named Ian, was a professional footballer who started his senior career with Celtic, before being farmed out to Tranent Juniors, also playing for Hearts as well as city rivals Hibernian. Peter Black, Ian's grandfather, was also a footballer; he is the only one in the family to be a goalkeeper.

It was reported in May 2011 that Black, along with his Hearts teammate Robert Ogleby, had been arrested and charged with possession of a class A drug in an Edinburgh night club. On 17 February 2012 the case was dismissed due to the repeated failure of witnesses to attend court. Black was banned from driving for 12 months in March 2023 after he was found guilty of driving under the influence of alcohol.

== Career statistics ==
As of match played 27 May 2017.

Club statistics
League Cup		Europe		Other		Total								
App	Goals	App	Goals	App	Goals	App	Goals	App	Goals	App	Goals			
Inverness Caledonian Thistle	2004–05	Scottish Premier League	13	0	0	0	0	0	−		0	0	13	0
Inverness Caledonian Thistle	2005–06	Scottish Premier League	26	1	3	0	2	0	−		0	0	31	1
Inverness Caledonian Thistle	2006–07	Scottish Premier League	26	0	1	0	0	0	−		0	0	27	0
Inverness Caledonian Thistle	2007–08	Scottish Premier League	33	3	1	0	1	0	−		0	0	35	3
Inverness Caledonian Thistle	2008–09	Scottish Premier League	34	4	2	0	2	0	−		0	0	38	4
Inverness Caledonian Thistle	Total		132	8	7	0	5	0	−		0	0	144	8
Hearts	2009–10	Scottish Premier League	26	1	1	0	3	0	−		0	0	30	1
Hearts	2010–11	Scottish Premier League	32	1	1	0	1	0	−		0	0	34	1
Hearts	2011–12	Scottish Premier League	29	2	6	0	0	0	3^{[a]}	0	0	0	38	2
Hearts	Total		87	4	8	0	4	0	3	0	0	0	102	4
Rangers	2012–13	Scottish Third Division	29	2	3	0	3	0	−		3^{[b]}	0	38	2
Rangers	2013–14	Scottish League One	32	2	5	0	1	0	−		4^{[b]}	1	42	3
Rangers	2014–15	Scottish Championship	24	1	3	0	5	1	−		3^{[c]}	1	35	3
Rangers	Total		85	5	11	0	9	1	−		10	2	115	8
Shrewsbury Town	2015–16	League One	30	1	5	0	−		−		1^{[d]}	0	36	1
Shrewsbury Town	2016–17	League One	19	3	2	0	0	0	−		2^{[e]}	0	23	3
Shrewsbury Town	Total		49	4	7	0	0	0	−		3	0	59	4
Blackpool	2016–17	League Two	10	0	−		−		−		3^{[f]}	0	13	0
Career total			363	21	33	0	18	1	3	0	16	2	432	24

Footnotes

a. Appearances in the Europa League.
b. Appearances in the Scottish League Challenge Cup.
c. 3 appearances and 1 goal in the Scottish League Challenge Cup. 2 appearances in the Scottish Championship Playoffs.
d. Appearance in the Football League Trophy
e. Appearance in the EFL Trophy
f. Appearances in the League Two play-offs

== Honours ==
Heart of Midlothian

- Scottish Cup: 2011–12

Rangers

- Scottish Football League Third Division: 2012–13
- Scottish League One: 2013–14

Blackpool

- EFL League Two play-offs: 2017
