= Andrew Little (footballer) =

Northern Irish footballer (born 1989)

Personal information
- Full name: Andrew Little
- Date of birth: 12 May 1989 (age 37)
- Place of birth: Enniskillen, Northern Ireland
- Height: 1.83 m (6 ft 0 in)
- Position: Utility player

Youth career
- Ballinamallard United
- 2006–2008: Rangers

Senior career*
Years	Team	Apps	(Gls)
2008–2014	Rangers	65	(33)
2011	→ Port Vale (loan)	7	(0)
2014–2016	Preston North End	12	(1)
2015–2016	→ Blackpool (loan)	5	(1)
2016	→ Accrington Stanley (loan)	0	(0)
2017–2018	Stirling Albion	13	(1)
2018	Dumbarton	6	(0)
Total		108	(36)

International career
	Northern Ireland U17	7	(2)
2006–2008	Northern Ireland U19	11	(5)
2008–2010	Northern Ireland U21	6	(3)
2009	Northern Ireland B	1	(0)
2009–2012	Northern Ireland	9	(0)
- * Club domestic league appearances and goals as of 19:40 6 November 2018 (UTC)

Andrew Little (born 12 May 1989) is a Northern Irish former footballer who played mainly as a forward.

A versatile player, he could play in any outfield position, though he preferred a more attacking role. He left Ballinamallard United for Rangers in 2006, where he turned professional the following year. He made some first-team appearances in 2009–10 but was otherwise limited to youth and reserve team football until he won a loan move to Port Vale in August 2011. He returned to Rangers and was a key player as they won the Scottish Third Division title in 2012–13 and the League One title in 2013–14. He signed with Preston North End in June 2014 and was loaned out to Blackpool in November 2015, and Accrington Stanley in March 2016. Preston released him in May 2016 and he joined Stirling Albion in February 2017, where he played until May 2018. He signed with Dumbarton in July 2018 but retired in November 2018 following persistent injury problems.

Having represented Northern Ireland at under-19 and under-21 levels, as well as making one appearance for the "B" team, he won his first senior cap in March 2009 and appeared nine times in total.

== Club career ==
=== Rangers ===
A former Ballinamallard United player, he moved from Northern Ireland to Scotland in 2006 to join the Rangers Academy. He scored for the Gers in the club's Scottish Youth Cup final victory over Old Firm rival's Celtic at Hampden Park in 2008. That season he also helped the club to top the SPFL Development League.

He made his senior debut as a substitute for Kris Boyd in the 3–0 win over St Mirren in the Scottish Cup semi-finals on 25 April 2009. The next month he was selected as a member of Rangers' HKFC Soccer Sevens side; he helped the side to reach the final of the tournament, where they then lost out to Celtic. On 4 October 2009, Little was given his first Rangers start against Celtic at right-back but was substituted eleven minutes in after injuring his hamstring in the opening minute of the match. He scored his first goal for the club on 23 January 2010, in a league game against Hearts which finished 1–1. Overall, he made ten appearances in the 2009–10 season.

He scored his second goal for the club on 27 October 2010, in a League Cup game against Kilmarnock. The goal was later a candidate for the club's goal of the season award. However, he then missed much of the rest of the season with a hip injury that eventually required surgery to correct. Upon his recovery, Little signed a one-year contract extension in July 2011.

Looking for first-team football, Little went on loan at Port Vale on 31 August 2011. His loan deal was due to last until 1 January 2012, however, he returned on 24 October 2011 after he suffered knee ligament damage. He made two starts and five substitute appearances for the League Two club, with his contribution at Vale Park also limited by call-ups to the Northern Ireland squad. Little played his first SPL game of the 2011–12 season on 26 February and justified Ally McCoist's selection at the Caledonian Stadium by scoring in a 4–1 win over Inverness Caledonian Thistle. On 26 March, he came off the bench to score with his first touch in a 3–2 home win over Celtic. On 21 April, he scored a brace in a 3–0 win over Hearts at Tynecastle.

He was able to leave Rangers following the club's financial meltdown and expulsion from the SPL. Instead, he signed a new contract with the club in July 2012, having decided to stay and try to help Rangers to win promotion out of the Third Division. He agreed to sign the two-year contract (with the option for a third year) after McCoist reassured him that he had big part to play in the club's promotion campaign, and also after Michael O'Neill reassured him that playing in the Third Division would not damage his international prospects. He scored four minutes into the 2012–13 season, in a Scottish Challenge Cup victory over Brechin City.

He scored his first hat-trick at Ibrox on 18 August, in a 5–1 win over East Stirlingshire. With five goals to his name, Little won the SFL Ginger Boot (top goalscorer award) for August 2012. Rangers secured the Third Division title by a comfortable margin, and were confirmed as champions on 30 March. Little was voted onto the PFA Scotland Team of the Year for the Third Division, alongside teammates Lee McCulloch, Lee Wallace, and David Templeton.

Rangers won the League One title in 2013–14. However, Little missed much of the campaign after breaking his cheekbone and jaw in a collision with Dunfermline Athletic full-back Alex Whittle in November. He was released from Rangers in May 2014 after being informed that he was no longer a part of manager Ally McCoist's first-team plans.

=== Preston North End ===
Little signed a two-year contract with League One side Preston North End in June 2014; "Lilywhites" manager Simon Grayson stated that "I am delighted that he has chosen us over quite a few other teams". He was limited to 12 league appearances in the 2014–15 campaign as Preston won promotion into the Championship through the play-offs.

Little joined League One side Blackpool on a six-week loan deal on 17 November 2015, which was later extended by a further month. On 24 March, he joined Accrington Stanley of League Two on loan until the end of the 2015–16 campaign; manager John Coleman said "Andy's suffered with injuries this year so this is a chance for him to get some football and get himself back on track". He never featured for Accrington however, and was released by Preston at the end of the season.

=== Stirling Albion ===
After several months out of football, Little signed for Scottish League Two club Stirling Albion on a short-term contract in February 2017. He was hospitalised on 11 April after an accidental clash of heads during training left him with a fractured skull and eye socket. Little was released by Albion at the end of the season, with manager Dave Mackay expressing his desire to have a smaller squad for the 2017–18 season. Little rejoined Stirling on a one-year contract. However, he was unable to feature for the Binos during the first half of the season as he had not yet fully recovered from his head injury. Little left Forthbank Stadium following the end of this contract in May 2018.

=== Dumbarton ===
After impressing during a trial period, Little signed a short-term deal with Scottish League One side Dumbarton in July 2018. He left the club and retired from football in November 2018 after making 11 appearances for the Sons.

== International career ==
Little won eleven caps for the Northern Ireland under-19s, scoring four goals, including one in the 2008 Milk Cup final victory over Chile. He then moved up to the under-21 side, where he made four appearances, scoring against Scotland and twice against San Marino. He won a cap for the "B team" against Scotland in 2009.

Little made his debut for the senior team on 28 March 2009 in a 2010 World Cup qualifier against Poland; he replaced David Healy in the 90th minute of the match and Northern Ireland went on to win 3–2. He picked up further caps in friendlies against Italy, Albania, Turkey, and Chile.

== Coaching career ==
Little returned to Rangers in May 2017 as a part-time coach in the club's Academy.

== Style of play ==
A utility player, Little could play anywhere in defence and midfield and could also be used as a striker.

"I don't really have a set position, I have played upfront, right-back and in midfield, but I feel I am more comfortable the further up the pitch I play."

— Little commenting on his preferred playing position in August 2011.

== Personal life ==
Little's older brother Graham is a presenter for Sky Sports.

== Career statistics ==
=== Club ===
Appearances and goals by club, season and competition
Club	Season	League			National cup (Note: Includes Scottish Cup, FA Cup)		League cup (Note: Includes Scottish League Cup, Football League Cup)		Other		Total	
Club	Season	Division	Apps	Goals	Apps	Goals	Apps	Goals	Apps	Goals	Apps	Goals
Rangers	2008–09	SPL	0	0	1	0	0	0	0	0	1	0
Rangers	2009–10	SPL	6	1	3	0	1	0	0	0	10	1
Rangers	2010–11	SPL	0	0	0	0	2	1	0	0	2	1
Rangers	2011–12	SPL	10	5	1	0	0	0	0	0	11	5
Rangers	2012–13	Third Division	28	22	3	0	3	1	2 (Note: Appearance(s) in the Scottish Challenge Cup.)	2	36	25
Rangers	2013–14	Scottish League One	21	5	3	0	1	0	4	1	29	6
Rangers	Total		65	33	11	0	7	2	6	3	89	38
Port Vale (loan)	2011–12	League Two	7	0	—		—		0	0	7	0
Preston North End	2014–15	League One	12	1	1	0	2	1	1 (Note: Appearance(s) in the EFL Trophy.)	0	16	2
Preston North End	2015–16	Championship	0	0	0	0	0	0	—		0	0
Preston North End	Total		12	1	1	0	2	1	1	0	16	2
Blackpool (loan)	2015–16	League One	5	1	—		—		—		5	1
Accrington Stanley (loan)	2015–16	League Two	0	0	—		—		—		0	0
Stirling Albion	2016–17	Scottish League Two	5	0	—		—		—		5	0
Stirling Albion	2017–18	Scottish League Two	8	1	0	0	0	0	0	0	8	1
Stirling Albion	Total		13	1	0	0	0	0	0	0	13	1
Dumbarton	2018–19	Scottish League One	6	0	0	0	4	0	1	0	11	0
Career total			108	36	12	0	13	3	8	3	141	42

=== International ===
Northern Ireland national team
Year	Apps	Goals
2009	2	0
2010	4	0
2011	1	0
2012	2	0
Total	9	0

== Honours ==
=== Club ===
Rangers

- SPFL Development League: 2007–08
- Scottish Premier League: 2009–10
- Scottish Football League Third Division: 2012–13
- Scottish League One: 2013–14

=== International ===
Northern Ireland

- Milk Cup under-19s: 2008

=== Individual ===
- PFA Scotland Team of the Year (Third Division): 2012–13
