= Ian Black (footballer, born 1960) =

Scottish footballer

Personal information
- Date of birth: 4 February 1960 (age 66)
- Place of birth: Edinburgh, Scotland
- Position: Full back

Senior career*
Years	Team	Apps	(Gls)
1978–1980	Heart of Midlothian	32	(0)
1980	Hibernian	2	(0)
1980	East Fife	3	(0)
1980–1982	Berwick Rangers	32	(2)
Total		69	(2)
- * Club domestic league appearances and goals

Ian Black (born 4 February 1960) is a Scottish former professional footballer who played as a full back in the Scottish Football League for Hearts, Hibernian, East Fife and Berwick Rangers.

== Personal life ==
Black's son, also named Ian, also played for Hearts.
