= Graham Little =

Northern Irish TV presenter and journalist (born 1978)

Graham Little (born 12 April 1978) is a freelance Northern Irish television presenter and journalist. He is also the older brother of Dumbarton striker and Northern Ireland international Andrew Little.

== Broadcasting career ==
Little joined UTV in 2002 after working for The Impartial Reporter in his native Enniskillen. The following year, Little was voted the Best Broadcast Newcomer at the BT/IPR Awards.

In 2006, Little left UTV to work on a freelance basis, but has appeared on the station as a relief sports presenter and two one-off documentaries.

Little is currently the host of Sky Sports's coverage of Northern Ireland international football and Irish League Premiership matches and also presents regularly on Sky Sports News. He also presents BBC Northern Ireland's Out of the Blue live arts programme with Joanne Salley, and appeared on The One Show with two short films about the Titanic in April 2012. He has also worked on BBC Northern Ireland consumer affairs series In Your Corner, presented Eurosport's 2010 coverage of cycling's British National Road Race Championships, and fronted other cycling and golf programmes for Sky Sports. He has also presented and commentated at MMA events for a variety of channels including Bravo in the UK and ESPN in Asia. and Setanta Sports.

Little is also one half of the BBC Northern Ireland and RTÉ Two show Colin and Graham's Excellent Adventures in which he and close friend Colin Carroll tour the world and represent Ireland in obscure sporting events. He has written a travel book about his attempts to become a world champion in any sport, during which he captained Ireland to the amateur title at the World Elephant Polo Championships in Nepal. He has a regular adventure column in Yeah Baby, the inflight magazine of BMI Baby, and is also a regular contributor to the EasyJet Magazine. He was the host of ITV4's The Cycle Show, the show is longer broadcast

== Personal life ==
Little attended Enniskillen Model Primary School and Portora Royal School, and went on to study English and Sports Science at Loughborough University.

In addition to his journalism career, Little runs a media services company called NPE Media Ltd. Little is married and has two young sons. He climbed Mount Kilimanjaro on honeymoon in Africa and has completed a series of endurance challenges including the Marathon des Sables in 2012, cycling a mountain stage of the 2010 Tour de France, and swimming from Europe to Asia across the Dardanelles Strait in Turkey. He also captained a Team No Prior Experience to victory in the inaugural Race Around Ireland ultra-endurance cycle race in 2009, and in July 2011 was part of a relay team that broke the record for swimming the entire length of Lough Erne in his native County Fermanagh. Little's team completed the swim in 19 hours and 6 minutes, beating the previous best by three hours.
