= Craig Mather =

British businessman

- Born: April 1971 (age 55)

Craig Mather (born 1971) is a British businessman and was the chief operating officer and chief executive of Rangers Football Club.

== Career ==
Mather joined the club in 2012, shortly after it fell into administration, purchasing a 10% stake for £1 million. In April 2013 he was appointed CEO following the departure of Charles Green, on a salary of £500,000. He left the club in October 2013, citing "incessant attempts to destabilise the operations of the club". He was replaced as CEO by Graham Wallace, COO of Manchester City.

He also owns sports management firm Simply Sport Management based in the Midlands.
