= Robbie Crawford (footballer, born 1993) =

Scottish footballer (born 1993)

Personal information
- Full name: Robert David Crawford
- Date of birth: 19 March 1993 (age 33)
- Place of birth: Greenock, Scotland
- Position: Midfielder

Youth career
- 2001–2012: Rangers

Senior career*
Years	Team	Apps	(Gls)
2012–2016	Rangers	45	(6)
2014	→ Greenock Morton (loan)	10	(1)
2015–2016	→ Alloa Athletic (loan)	25	(1)
2016	Raith Rovers	0	(0)
2017	East Kilbride	3	(2)
2017–2019	FH	37	(6)
2019	IFK Mariehamn	28	(1)
2020–2021	Charleston Battery	39	(3)
2022	Monterey Bay	11	(0)
2022–2024	Charleston Battery	70	(1)

Managerial career
- 2025–: Charleston Battery (assistant)
- * Club domestic league appearances and goals as of January 9, 2025

Robert David Crawford (born 19 March 1993) is a Scottish retired footballer who is an assistant coach USL Championship club Charleston Battery. He has previously played for Rangers, Raith Rovers, East Kilbride, FH, IFK Mariehamn, and Charleston Battery as well as spending time on loan at Greenock Morton and Alloa Athletic.

== Career ==
=== Playing career ===
Crawford joined Rangers aged eight and played in the club's youth sides before progressing to the first team in the 2012–13 season when the club was demoted to the bottom division. Despite featuring as an unused substitute in the previous season, Crawford made his professional debut on 29 July 2012 in a Challenge Cup against Brechin City. He went on to score his first goal for the club on 23 September in a league match against Montrose and went on to finish the season with a total of five goals and 27 appearances.

Crawford joined Greenock Morton on loan for the first part of the 2014–15 season. He made his first Rangers appearance in over a year against Hearts. The following season on 1 September 2015, Crawford joined Alloa Athletic on a season-long loan. On 18 August 2016, Crawford had his contract with Rangers terminated. He signed a short-term contract with Raith Rovers in November 2016.

On 23 December 2016, it was announced that Crawford mutually terminated his contract with Raith Rovers. In January 2017, Crawford played three games for Lowland Football League side East Kilbride, scoring two goals before heading to America. He appeared in one pre-season game for U.S. club North Carolina FC. On 5 April 2017, he joined Icelandic champions FH.

On 15 January 2019, IFK Mariehamn announced the signing of Crawford on a one-year contract.

On 4 February 2020, Crawford joined USL Championship club Charleston Battery.

On 1 April 2022, Crawford joined USL Championship club Monterey Bay. On July 21, 2022, Crawford made the move back to Charleston Battery. Crawford announced his retirement in January 2025.

=== Coaching career ===
Following his retirement in January 2025, Crawford joined the technical staff of Charleston Battery as an assistant coach.

== Career statistics ==
As of match played 25 June 2019

Club	Season	League			National Cup		League Cup		Europe		Other		Total	
Club	Season	Division	Apps	Goals	Apps	Goals	Apps	Goals	Apps	Goals	Apps	Goals	Apps	Goals
Rangers	2011–12	Scottish Premier League	0	0	0	0	0	0	0	0	—		0	0
Rangers	2012–13	Scottish Third Division	21	4	2	1	2	0	—		2 (Note: Appearances in Scottish Challenge Cup.)	0	27	5
Rangers	2013–14	Scottish League One	20	2	1	0	1	0	—		3	0	25	2
Rangers	2014–15	Scottish Championship	4	0	—		0	0	—		1 (Note: Appearance in Scottish Premiership play-offs.)	0	5	0
Rangers	Total		45	6	3	1	3	0	—		6	0	57	7
Greenock Morton (loan)	2014–15	Scottish League One	10	1	1	0	—		—		1	0	12	1
Alloa Athletic (loan)	2015–16	Scottish Championship	25	1	1	0	—		—		—		26	1
Raith Rovers	2016–17	Scottish Championship	0	0	—		—		—		—		0	0
East Kilbride	2016–17	Lowland League	3	2	—		—		—		—		3	2
FH	2017	Úrvalsdeild	19	1	3	0	2	1	5 (Note: 3 appearances in Champions League, 2 appearances in Europa League.)	0	1 (Note: Appearance in Icelandic Super Cup.)	0	30	2
FH	2018	Úrvalsdeild	18	5	4	0	3	0	4	1	4 (Note: Appearances in Fótbolti.net Cup.)	0	33	6
FH	Total		37	6	7	0	5	1	9	0	5	0	63	8
IFK Mariehamn	2019	Veikkausliiga	9	0	9	0	0	0	—		—		18	0
Charleston Battery	2020	USL Championship	15	1							2		17	2
Charleston Battery	2021	USL Championship	24	2									24	2
Monterey Bay FC	2022	USL Championship	11	0	1	1							12	1
Charleston Battery	2022	USL Championship	11	0									11	0
Charleston Battery	2023	USL Championship	23	.	3	1							26	1
Career total			135	19	23	3	8	1	9	1	22	0	247	21

== Honours ==
Rangers

- Scottish Third Division: 2012–13
- Scottish League One: 2013–14

Greenock Morton

- Scottish League One: 2014–15

Charleston Battery

- Eastern Conference Champion (Playoffs): 2023
