= Kamil Wiktorski =

Polish footballer (born 1993)

Personal information
- Date of birth: 12 March 1993 (age 33)
- Place of birth: Bydgoszcz, Poland
- Height: 1.88 m (6 ft 2 in)
- Position: Centre-back

Team information
- Current team: 1599 Șelimbăr
- Number: 4

Youth career
- 2003–2009: Zawisza Bydgoszcz
- 2009–2012: Rangers

Senior career*
Years	Team	Apps	(Gls)
2012–2013	Rangers	0	(0)
2014–2015	Dolcan Ząbki	8	(1)
2016	Legionovia Legionowo	13	(2)
2016–2017	Zagłębie Sosnowiec	23	(0)
2017–2020	Podbeskidzie Bielsko-Biała	50	(1)
2020	Chojniczanka Chojnice	11	(0)
2020–2021	Dunărea Călărași	26	(0)
2021–2024	Gloria Buzău	60	(2)
2024	Tunari	9	(0)
2024–2025	Ceahlăul Piatra Neamț	24	(1)
2025–	1599 Șelimbăr	31	(2)

International career
2008	Poland U15	4	(0)
2008–2009	Poland U16	5	(0)
2009	Poland U17	3	(2)
2011	Poland U19	3	(0)
- * Club domestic league appearances and goals as of 31 October 2026

Kamil Wiktorski (born 12 March 1993) is a Polish professional footballer who plays as a centre-back for Liga II club 1599 Șelimbăr.

== Career ==
=== Club ===
He made his debut for Podbeskidzie in a 1–1 draw against Radomiak Radom on 22 July 2017.

On 3 February 2020, Wiktorski signed for Chojniczanka Chojnice until 30 June 2020.

== Honours ==
Rangers FC

- Scottish League Two: 2012–13
