= Sébastien Faure (footballer) =

French footballer (born 1991)

Personal information
- Date of birth: 3 January 1991 (age 35)
- Place of birth: Lyon, France
- Height: 1.85 m (6 ft 1 in)
- Position: Defender

Team information
- Current team: Limonest

Youth career
- 1997–2004: FC Cailloux-sur-Fontaines
- 2004–2008: Lyon

Senior career*
Years	Team	Apps	(Gls)
2008–2012	Lyon	0	(0)
2010–2012	Lyon B	41	(0)
2012	→ Nantes (loan)	0	(0)
2012–2015	Rangers	59	(1)
2015–2016	Lyon B	2	(0)
2016–2022	GOAL FC (Note: In 2020, Monts d'Or Azergues Foot merged with several smaller clubs to form GOAL FC.)	93	(2)
2022–	Limonest	42	(1)

International career^{‡}
2007–2008	France U17	15	(0)
2008–2009	France U18	9	(0)
2009–2010	France U19	8	(0)
2010–2011	France U20	12	(0)
Medal record
Men's football
Representing France
UEFA European Under-17 Championship
Runner-up	2008 Turkey
- * Club domestic league appearances and goals as of 20:37, 22 April 2022 (UTC) ‡ National team caps and goals as of 7 December 2024

Sébastien Faure (French pronunciation: [sebastjɛ̃ fɔʁ]; born 3 January 1991) is a French professional footballer who plays as a defender for Championnat National 3 club Limonest.

He is a former France youth international, and has represented his nation at various age levels.

== Club career ==
=== Lyon ===
Faure was born in the second arrondissement of Lyon and was with Olympique Lyonnais from when he was a child, starting off in the club's academy until 2012.

Faure became active in the squad at the start of the 2008–09 season. He was promoted to the first-team squad where he was given the number 36 shirt and began participating in Lyon's pre-season tour. Faure appeared in three of the team's five matches starting one against Rapid București and appearing as a substitute in matches against Monaco and Nîmes Olympique.

He made his professional debut on 11 November 2008 against Metz in the 2008–09 edition of the Coupe de la Ligue starting in the centre back position alongside the Brazilian Cris. Unfortunately, the match resulted in a 3–1 loss with Faure playing the full 90 minutes and picking up a yellow card. In December 2011, Faure suffered a broken toe. During January 2012, Faure was linked with a move to Nantes. He joined Nantes on loan, but suffered pain from his previous broken toe injury and quickly returned to Lyon, where he remained until the end of his contract in the summer of 2012.

After being released by Lyon at the end of his contract, Faure was linked with a move to fellow Ligue 1 club Evian. He joined English club Leeds United on trial and played in their 2–0 win over Alfreton Town on 21 July.

=== Rangers ===
Faure joined Rangers on a three-year deal, pending international clearance, on 21 August 2012. After the move, Faure said he signed because manager Ally McCoist persuaded him. He made his debut against First Division side Falkirk in the Scottish League Cup on 30 August 2012. On 23 February 2013, Faure scored his first ever senior goal in the Third Division against Berwick Rangers, contributing to a 3–1 away win.

Faure had his first run out of the season in the 8–1 win over Clyde in the Challenge Cup on 18 August 2014. His performance was praised for his pace and effectiveness in a right wing-back role, despite his preferred position being at centre back. Faure left Rangers at the end of his contract in the summer of 2015.

=== Later career ===
Faure joined French lower-league side Monts d'Or Azergues (renamed GOAL FC in 2020) in 2016, and became the club's captain.

== International career ==
Faure has been active on the international circuit. He was a part of the under-17 team that finished runners-up at the 2008 UEFA European Under-17 Football Championship and also played with the under-18 squad making his debut in the Tournoi de Limoges.

He was part of the French side that won the 2010 UEFA European Under-19 Football Championship and was one of only 3 members of the squad to play every minute of every game at the finals as France defeated the Netherlands 4–1, Austria 5–0, drew 1–1 with England then beat Croatia 2–1 en route to the final. In the final itself he made an important goal line clearance to stop Spain taking a two-goal lead with France eventually running out 2–1 winners.

He then went on to feature in the 2011 FIFA U-20 World Cup for the under-20 team as the France side finished in fourth place.

== Honours ==
Rangers

- Scottish Third Division: 2013
- Scottish League One: 2014

France U19

- UEFA European Under-19 Football Championship: 2010
