= Kim Skogsrud =

Norwegian footballer (born 1993)

Personal information
- Full name: Kim Eugen Skogsrud
- Date of birth: 14 April 1993 (age 33)
- Place of birth: Norway
- Height: 1.80 m (5 ft 11 in)
- Position: Central defender

Youth career
- Skeid
- 2009–2011: Manchester City
- 2011–2012: Rangers

Senior career*
Years	Team	Apps	(Gls)
2012–2015	Sandefjord	19	(0)
2012–2014	Sandefjord 2	23	(1)
2014	→ Strømmen (loan)	10	(0)
2014	→ Strømmen 2 (loan)	3	(2)
2015–2018	Egersund	72	(2)
2017	Egersund 2	3	(0)
2018–2019	Skeid	45	(1)
2023	Sagene	9	(5)
Total		184	(11)

International career
2008	Norway U15	4	(1)
2009	Norway U16	7	(0)
2010	Norway U17	6	(0)
2011	Norway U18	8	(1)
2012	Norway U19	6	(1)
- * Club domestic league appearances and goals

Kim Eugen Skogsrud (born 14 April 1993) is a Norwegian former footballer who played as a defender.

== Club career ==
=== Early career ===
Raised in Oslo with his twin brother, Tom, the pair began their footballing career with Skeid. They were scouted by English Premier League side Manchester City, going on trial in April 2008 before going on to sign a contract in November of the same year. Having made the move to Manchester in the summer of 2009, the brothers were housed with a host family, and Skogsrug later described his struggles adapting to life at a professional football club in England, stating the changes were a "culture shock" to him.

After two years with Manchester City, the brothers were offered deals with Scottish side Rangers, and accepted contracts in May 2011 which made them the highest paid academy players in the club's history. However, the club went into administration in February 2012, and following relegation to the Scottish Football League Third Division, the brothers left the club with one year left on their two-year deals.

=== Return to Norway ===
On their return to Norway, the twins joined Norwegian First Division side Sandefjord. After two years, in which he featured sparingly, Skogsrud was loaned to fellow Norwegian First Division side Strømmen in August 2014 following an injury sustained earlier in the year.

Having departed Sandefjord in March 2015, Skogsrud joined Norwegian Second Division side Egersund, also taking up an apprenticeship as a plumber. He would go on to re-join former side Skeid in 2018, also reuniting with his brother, who had joined the club a year earlier. He left the club after two seasons, retiring at the age of twenty-six.

== International career ==
Skogsrud represented Norway from under-15 to under-19 level.

== Personal life ==
While in Glasgow playing for Rangers, Skogsrud met his future wife, with whom he would have two children. Having returned to Norway, Skogsrud and his brother began working for their father's plumbing company.

== Career statistics ==
=== Club ===
Appearances and goals by club, season and competition
Club	Season	League			Cup		Other		Total	
Club	Season	Division	Apps	Goals	Apps	Goals	Apps	Goals	Apps	Goals
Sandefjord	2012	1. divisjon	4	0	1 (Note: Appearances in the Norwegian Football Cup)	0	1 (Note: Appearances in the Tippeligaen promotion playoff)	0	6	0
Sandefjord	2013	1. divisjon	15	0	3	0	0	0	18	0
Sandefjord	2014	1. divisjon	0	0	0	0	0	0	0	0
Sandefjord	Total		19	0	4	0	1	0	24	0
Sandefjord 2	2012	3. divisjon	6	0	–		0	0	6	0
Sandefjord 2	2013	3. divisjon	15	1	–		0	0	15	1
Sandefjord 2	2014	3. divisjon	2	0	–		0	0	2	0
Sandefjord 2	Total		23	1	0	0	0	0	23	1
Strømmen (loan)	2014	1. divisjon	10	0	0	0	0	0	10	0
Strømmen 2 (loan)	2014	3. divisjon	3	2	–		0	0	3	2
Egersund	2015	2. divisjon	26	0	1	0	0	0	27	0
Egersund	2016	2. divisjon	24	0	2	0	0	0	26	0
Egersund	2017	2. divisjon	22	2	2	0	0	0	24	2
Egersund	Total		72	2	5	0	0	0	77	2
Egersund 2	2017	4. divisjon	3	0	–		0	0	3	0
Skeid	2018	2. divisjon	25	1	3	0	0	0	28	1
Skeid	2019	1. divisjon	20	0	2	0	0	0	22	0
Skeid	Total		45	1	3	0	0	0	48	1
Sagene	2023	7. divisjon	9	5	0	0	0	0	9	5
Career total			184	11	14	0	0	0	198	11
