= PLUS Markets Group =

- Type: Stock Exchange
- Location: London, United Kingdom
- Founded: 2005
- Closed: 2012
- Key people: Simon Brickles (CEO 2004-2009) Stephen Hazell-Smith (Chairman 2005-2009) Cyril Theret (CEO 2010 to 2012); Giles Vardey (Chairman 2010-2012); Nemone Wynn-Evans (CFO 2008-2012)
- No. of listings: 1 listed and 166 unlisted
- Website: plusmarketsgroup.com

PLUS Markets Group was a UK electronic stock exchange based in London for small cap companies. It was a market operator under MiFID Markets in Financial Instruments Directive, and was both a regulated market and a multilateral trading facility.

PLUS Market Group was the holding company for PLUS Stock Exchange (PLUS-SX), PLUS Derivatives (PLUS-DX) and Plus Technology (PLUS-TX). It provided cash trading, listing, derivatives and technology services. After the group got into financial trouble in 2012 it looked for ways to sell the business. The exchange, containing all the listed companies and the exchange license, was sold to ICAP and the technology division was sold to GMEX Group (formerly Forum Trading Solutions).

PLUS Markets was acquired by ICAP in 2012 and rebranded as ICAP Securities and Derivatives Exchange (ISDX).

== History ==
PLUS Markets grew out of a growth-company stock market named OFEX, which effectively collapsed in September 2004 after a failed fundraising. PLUS was launched in 2005 as a competitor to the London Stock Exchange's Alternative Investment Market using a new electronic trading exchange software. The PLUS Service, as it was known, was launched on the 30 November 2005, and enabled brokers to trade any stock on the LSE's official list.

The OFEX name was discontinued in late 2006, once regulatory changes had been made. The group gained the gold standard recognised investment exchange (RIE) licence in July 2007 but struggled to make much headway against the dominant LSE. In particular, it found itself unable to trade AIM-listed stocks and eventually commenced legal action against the LSE. The LSE settled, but the arrival of the credit crisis in 2008 prevented successful trading. The group also struggled to maintain allegiance to its original constituency of small-company listings. Although it did host some well-known names, including Arsenal Football Club it failed to break even and the group eventually got into financial difficulty in 2012.

In 2008 PLUS posted a pre-tax loss of £8.26 million for 2009, following a pre-tax loss of £10.20 million for 2008. It also announced the results of a strategic review, outlining plans to move away from its core retail market and develop a new platform with a view to trade more exotic securities, such as derivatives

In May 2012 it initially announced that it would wind down its operations and close after failing to find a buyer, but then a week later on 18 May 2012 it announced that ICAP, the interdealer broker, would buy PLUS Stock Exchange (PLUS-SX) and its derivative operations. The group later sold the technology division PLUS-TS to GMEX Group (formerly Forum Trading Solutions). After renaming itself as NEX Group in 2016, ICAP was bought out by CME Group in 2018.

== Management ==
PLUS Markets Group was initially run by Simon Brickles, formerly Head of AIM at the London Stock Exchange. He had been recruited to manage OFEX and became chief executive of the rescued firm at the end of 2004. Veteran small companies fund manager Stephen Hazell-Smith joined as chairman in 2005. In 2009 Brickles and Hazell-Smith stepped down and were replaced by Cyril Theret, formerly the business development director at PLUS, and Giles Vardey as chairman. The finance director was Nemone Wynn-Evans, also a former business development director at the company.

== See also ==
- London Stock Exchange
- Alternative Investment Market
- Markets in Financial Instruments Directive
- List of stock exchanges in the Commonwealth of Nations
