= Craig Whyte =

Scottish businessman (born 1971)

Craig Thomas Whyte
- Born: 18 January 1971 (age 55); Motherwell, Scotland
- Occupation: Venture capitalist

Craig Thomas Whyte (born 18 January 1971) is a Scottish businessman best known for his controversial spell as owner of Scottish football club Rangers.

Whyte first entered business in a plant hire company, after which he moved into security, manufacturing and property. He bought the controlling interest in Rangers Football Club from its majority shareholder David Murray in May 2011, and subsequently put the club into administration in February 2012 and then liquidation in July 2012.

== Early life ==
Born in Motherwell, Whyte was educated at Kelvinside Academy in Glasgow. When he was 15, Whyte took an interest in financial markets, and made more than £20,000 buying and selling shares before he left school.

== Business career ==
Whyte's first job was with his father's plant hire firm, and in 1990 he set up his own plant-hire company. The company, Whyte Hire, was not a success and went bankrupt in the early 1990s with debts of around £300,000. Whyte recovered from this loss and branched out into security, manufacturing and property. In 1997, aged 26, he was Scotland's youngest millionaire. After selling off most of his businesses, he moved to Monaco. When he moved to London, he became a venture capitalist. The London-based group he heads, Liberty Capital, specialises in buying distressed businesses, turning them around, and selling them on.

=== Ownership of Rangers FC ===
Whyte was a lifelong supporter of Rangers Football Club and held an executive box at Ibrox Stadium. Speculation arose in 2010 that he might launch a bid to buy the indebted Scottish football club. In April 2011, a £28 million deal was thought possible, but this was dependent on agreement with Lloyds Banking Group on how the club's debt would be serviced and a tax assessment of, potentially, £49 million from HM Revenue & Customs.

Sir David Murray sold his controlling interest in Rangers (85.3%) to Wavetower Limited for £1 on 6 May 2011, with Rangers' debt to the Lloyds Banking Group being reassigned to Wavetower. Wavetower Limited (subsequently renamed The Rangers FC Group Limited) is owned by Liberty Capital, which is Whyte's holding company. The then Rangers manager Walter Smith was reported as welcoming the takeover for the stability it would bring to the club. Whyte said he was proud to be the owner of Rangers and pledged to invest £25 million into transfers, over five years. Regarding the takeover, Whyte was quoted as saying, "Obviously I'm a massive Rangers fan and have been since I was a boy. I'm here first and foremost because I'm a Rangers supporter. I also see a great opportunity and think that Rangers can be a great worldwide brand. I believe there are many commercial activities that can be expanded on."

As part of his reforms Whyte allowed women into the Rangers directors' room for the first time, angering regressive elements of the boardroom including John Greig in the process. Whyte was determined to rid the club of "freeloaders", telling the "unsophisticated" Greig: "It's my club and I can do what I want. I can invite the guests that I want".

A BBC Scotland documentary, Rangers: The Inside Story, aired in October 2011, claimed that Whyte had illegally been a de facto Director of a company called Re-Tex during a seven-year period when he was banned from doing so – a claim supported by Robert Burns, the Inspector of Companies at the Insolvency Service, who retired in October 2012. Prior to Re-Tex being wound up in 2003, the company made an offer to sell shares to potential shareholders at a price based on company statements that BBC alleged contained "false and misleading" information, formed from accounts signed off by fake auditors appointed by Whyte. The auditors were allegedly run by a convicted fraudster – and former associate of Whyte's – Kevin Sykes. Whyte's ban from being a Director followed the failure of one of his companies – Vital Holdings Ltd – to produce satisfactory accounts. The investigation also alleged that Whyte had taken part in a number of additional criminal acts, including the receipt of £100,000 from the Re-Tex account, ostensibly to pay a tax bill – a payment that was never received by the Inland Revenue. In his response to these claims, Craig Whyte denied all allegations of criminality, and stated that he had only ever been a minor shareholder in Re-Tex, rather than a de facto Director.

Rangers FC withdrew all cooperation with the BBC following what the club referred to as "repeated difficulties", describing the investigative programme as a "prejudiced muckraking exercise". Immediately after the programme aired, a spokesman stated that Whyte had instructed his lawyers to "commence immediate legal proceedings against the BBC". However, on 30 November 2011, Rangers confirmed in a statement to the PLUS stock exchange that Whyte had been banned from acting as a Director. Whyte began defamation proceedings against the BBC and Burns in February 2012. A subsequent investigation by the Scottish Football Association determined that Whyte was not a fit and proper person to run a football club.

On 13 February 2012, Rangers filed legal papers at the Court of Session giving notice of its intention to appoint Administrators. Rangers officially entered administration on the following day, appointing London-based financial advisers Duff & Phelps as administrators. This move was forced by Rangers' failure to make £9 million in PAYE and VAT payments since Whyte took control. It was discovered that Whyte had financed his takeover of the club by mortgaging future revenues, rather than by investing any personal funds or other funds to which he had access. Whyte sold his controlling interest in Rangers for £2 to a consortium led by Charles Green on 13 May 2012, following what had, in effect, become an auction process among various consortia for ownership of the club, overseen by Duff and Phelps in that company's role as Administrator. Green offered creditors a settlement in an attempt to exit administration, but this was rejected by the biggest creditor, HMRC, on 14 June 2012, ensuring liquidation. Green was then able to buy out the business and associated assets of Rangers from the Administrator.

==== Subsequent legal actions ====
On 25 June 2012, the Crown Office asked Strathclyde Police to investigate the purchase of Rangers and the club's subsequent financial management.

The ticketing firm Ticketus, which provided Whyte with funding to buy Rangers, successfully sued Whyte for damages in 2013. Whyte was banned from being a company director for 15 years in September 2014.

A warrant was issued on 14 November 2014 by the Crown Office for Whyte's arrest in connection with alleged fraud carried out during the purchase of Rangers. Four arrests were also made in England on 14 November 2014 as part of the ongoing investigation. On 27 November 2014, Whyte had been detained by police in Mexico and was held due to an arrest warrant in relation to the ongoing investigation into his takeover of Rangers in 2011.

On 28 November he appeared at Glasgow Sheriff Court, no plea or declaration was made, and he was released on bail.

Whyte was again arrested in September 2015 when he attended Govan Police Station. On 2 September he appeared at Glasgow Sheriff Court along with the former Rangers FC Chief Executive, Charles Greene. Whyte was charged with conspiracy as well as a charge under Criminal Justice and Licensing (Scotland) Act 2010 Section 28(1). On 6 June 2017 he was acquitted of all charges, after a lengthy trial at Glasgow High Court.

Whyte was declared bankrupt at the High Court in London in October 2015, following his non-payment of damages awarded to Ticketus in 2013.

== Personal life ==
Whyte owned the historic Castle Grant, near Grantown-on-Spey, in the Scottish Highlands. He is reported to have spent £5 million on restorations and renovations to the castle. Following a court case in February 2012, Whyte was ordered to pay a disputed bill to a roofing contractor who had carried out repairs to the property.

Castle Grant was put on sale for over £1 million in April 2014 and in September was sold to foreign buyers.
