= Charles Green (businessman) =

British businessman and former chief executive of Rangers Football Club

- Born: Mexborough, South Yorkshire, England
- Occupation: Venture capitalist

Charles Alexander Green is a British businessman and was the Chief Executive of Rangers Football Club. Born in Mexborough in South Yorkshire he started his career as a professional footballer but failed to make a first-team appearance at either Sheffield United or Doncaster Rovers before drifting into non-league. Following a switch to business he has since held a number of positions before taking over at Rangers, including a period as Chief Executive of Sheffield United.

== Football career ==
Green started his football career as a schoolboy with Sheffield United before playing reserve team football at Doncaster Rovers. He left Doncaster without breaking into the first team and embarked upon a career in non-league football with teams like Alfreton Town where he made 40 appearances. A brief return to the Football League with Barnsley resulted in him again failing to make the first team returning to non-league football. He had spells with Frickley Athletic, Gainsborough Trinity, Goole Town and Cheltenham Town who signed him for £500 from Goole.

=== Sheffield United F.C. ===
Green was officially appointed chief executive of Sheffield United in February 1996 by chairman Mike McDonald following his take over of the club, although in reality Green had been operating in that role since September 1995. It was a period of rapid change for United and Green oversaw the day-to-day running of the club. By 1997 however, he had begun to take decisions over a wider area than his previous remit, including the running of the first team itself, leading to unrest amongst both supporters and staff. Green sacked popular manager Dave Bassett. In a subsequent row over compensation, Green reportedly invited Bassett to settle the issue with a car park brawl, but quickly backed down when Bassett acceded to the request.

In March 1998, manager Nigel Spackman resigned citing interference in team affairs by Green and in protest at a number of the club's better players being sold without consultation and without funds to replace them. After furious protests by United supporters Green stepped down as chief executive a few days later, although he remained on the PLC board for a period before leaving the club along with McDonald later that year.

=== After Sheffield United ===
After leaving Sheffield United, Green held a number of directional positions including a spell as non-executive chairman of Nova Resources Limited.

=== Rangers F.C. ===
On 13 May 2012, a consortium led by Green was named as preferred bidder for administration hit Scottish football club Rangers. As part of the takeover a company voluntary arrangement was proposed to the creditors, but this was formally rejected by largest creditor HMRC on 14 June 2012. This meant Green instead agreed a deal of £5.5 million to purchase Rangers' assets, enabling the club to continue. Green was then appointed as the club's chief executive, the same role he held at Sheffield United. During the takeover process there was strong speculation manager Ally McCoist was set to resign from Rangers after a conflict with Green, but he remained with the club.

The new company structure meant that Rangers had to apply for the transfer of their Scottish Premier League (SPL) share and have it decided by a vote between the twelve members of the SPL. The application was rejected on 4 July 2012 after a 10–1 'no' vote, with one abstention. The club then applied to join the Scottish Football League and on 13 July 2012 were voted into the Third Division, the fourth tier of Scottish football. Green then had to enter several days of negotiations with the governing bodies for the transfer of Rangers' Scottish Football Association membership, to allow the club to play football. A deal was eventually agreed on 27 July 2012, with conditions attached including providing the SFA with full information on the club's ownership structure and business plans, accepting a transfer embargo given to Rangers under the old company structure and settling outstanding football debts.

Green was charged by the SFA after claiming motives behind Rangers' punishment involved "bigotry". He was found guilty of bringing the game into disrepute and censured. Green was again charged with bringing the game into disrepute, this time in relation to comments on the SPL's independent panel investigating Rangers' use of Employee Benefit Trusts and alleged dual contracts. The charges against Green this time were found to be "not proven" on 4 October 2012.

On 11 October 2012, Green formally announced Rangers' intention to float shares on the AIM stock market, with the aim of raising up to £20 million. On 5 December 2012, it was revealed in an AIM announcement that Green holds a 14.96% shareholding in Rangers, projected to fall to 8.67% after the flotation. It was also revealed that the club had £17 million pledged from the share issue via business investors, and an aim to raise a further £10 million investment from supporters. On 18 December 2012, it was confirmed that the share issue had raised £22.2 million in total.

On 4 December 2012, Green announced that Rangers would be refusing an allocation of tickets for a Scottish Cup tie away to SPL club Dundee Utd, and also advocated a boycott of the match by Rangers supporters. They went on to lose the game 3-0.

In April 2013, Craig Whyte cast doubt on the Green consortium's ownership of Rangers' assets. Whyte produced secret recordings which showed Green was initially the front man for Whyte's own attempt to secure the assets, via Sevco 5088. Claiming Green had reneged on their secret deal, Whyte announced forthcoming legal action. The Scottish Football Association then wrote to Green asking for clarification of his links to Whyte. On 13 April 2013, following a board meeting, the Rangers board announced that they would commission an independent investigation into the allegations surrounding Green and Rangers Commercial Director Imran Ahmad's management of the club. It was also confirmed that Green himself would not take any part in the probe.

Charles Green stepped down as Rangers CEO in April 2013 and was replaced by Craig Mather.

He returned to the club as a consultant in August 2013, but lasted only three weeks before leaving the role. He also sold his shares in Rangers to businessman Sandy Easdale.

Police enquiries began first into Craig Whyte's purchase of Rangers in 2011 and then into Charles Green's consortium's acquisition of the business assets in 2012. On 1 September 2015, both Craig Whyte and Charles Green were arrested as part of the inquiry into the "alleged fraudulent acquisition" of Rangers' assets in 2012.

== Racism ==
In April 2013 Green was publicly criticised by anti–racism charity Show Racism the Red Card for using the term "Paki" in relation to his friend and colleague Imran Ahmad during an interview with a tabloid newspaper. Green also made reference to a former teammate at Worksop Town, whom he branded "Darkie" Johnson. Green defended the comments, accusing the charity of "a knee–jerk reaction," but admitted he would punish any racist players at the club. As the Scottish Football Association served Green with a notice of complaint, SFA chief executive Stewart Regan called the comments from someone in Green's position "surprising and frustrating." Green later apologised for the comments.
