= 2012–13 Scottish Third Division =

Irn Bru Scottish Third Division
- Season: 2012–13
- Champions: Rangers
- Promoted: Rangers
- Matches: 180
- Goals: 589 (3.27 per match)
- Top goalscorer: Andrew Little (Rangers) (22 goals)
- Biggest home win: Stirling Albion 9–1 East Stirlingshire
- Biggest away win: Montrose 0–6 Peterhead
- Highest scoring: Stirling Albion 9–1 East Stirlingshire
- Longest winning run: 11 games Rangers
- Longest unbeaten run: 20 games Rangers
- Longest winless run: 10 games East Stirlingshire
- Longest losing run: 10 games East Stirlingshire
- Highest attendance: 50,048; Rangers 1–0 Berwick Rangers
- Lowest attendance: 192; East Stirlingshire 2–2 Annan Athletic
- Average attendance: 5,598

The 2012–13 Scottish Football League Third Division (known as the Irn Bru Scottish Football League Third Division for sponsorship reasons) was the 19th season in the current format of 10 teams in the fourth tier of Scottish football. Alloa Athletic were the current champions.

Rangers were confirmed as champions after a goalless away draw with Montrose on 30 March. They were presented with the trophy after a 1–0 win against Berwick Rangers on 4 May in front of 50,048.

During their first season in the division, Rangers had one of the highest home attendances in Britain, consistently ranking in the top four in the UK as a whole and first in Scotland. They set the record for the highest attendance in a 4th tier league worldwide. Bottom side Stirling Albion defeated Rangers on 6 October 2012 in what was reported to be a shock result.

== Teams ==
Location of teams in 2012–13 Scottish Third Division

2011–12 champions Alloa Athletic were promoted from this division, and were replaced by Stirling Albion, who finished bottom of the Second Division. Another promotion spot was available through the promotion play-offs, however this was won by second division side Albion Rovers, who thus stayed in the Second Division. However, losing play-off finalists Stranraer were elevated to the Second Division as a result of Rangers being elected to the bottom tier.

There was no relegation from this division, as this is the lowest in the Scottish League.

=== Stadiums and locations ===
Team	Location	Home ground	Capacity
Annan Athletic	Annan	Galabank	3,500
Berwick Rangers	Berwick-upon-Tweed	Shielfield Park	4,131
Clyde	Cumbernauld	Broadwood Stadium	8,029
East Stirlingshire	Stenhousemuir	Ochilview Park	3,776
Elgin City	Elgin	Borough Briggs	3,927
Montrose	Montrose	Links Park	3,292
Peterhead	Peterhead	Balmoor	4,000
Queen's Park	Glasgow	Hampden Park	52,025
Rangers	Glasgow	Ibrox Stadium	50,987
Stirling Albion	Stirling	Forthbank Stadium	3,808

== League table ==
Pos	Team	Pld	W	D	L	GF	GA	GD	Pts	Promotion or qualification
1	Rangers (C, P)	36	25	8	3	87	29	+58	83	Promotion to League One
2	Peterhead	36	17	8	11	52	28	+24	59	Qualification for the Second Division Play-offs
3	Queen's Park	36	16	8	12	60	54	+6	56	Qualification for the Second Division Play-offs
4	Berwick Rangers	36	14	7	15	59	55	+4	49	Qualification for the Second Division Play-offs
5	Elgin City	36	13	10	13	67	69	−2	49	
6	Montrose	36	12	11	13	60	68	−8	47	
7	Stirling Albion	36	12	9	15	59	58	+1	45	
8	Annan Athletic	36	11	10	15	54	65	−11	43	
9	Clyde	36	12	4	20	42	66	−24	40	
10	East Stirlingshire	36	8	5	23	49	97	−48	29	

Source: SPFL archive
Rules for classification: 1) points; 2) goal difference; 3) number of goals scored.
(C) Champions; (P) Promoted

== Results ==
Teams play each other four times in this league. In the first half of the season each team plays every other team twice (home and away) and then do the same in the second half of the season, for a total of 36 games

=== First half of season ===
Home \ Away	ANN	BER	CLY	EST	ELG	MON	PET	QPA	RAN	STI
Annan Athletic		3–2	1–3	5–2	2–0	2–1	2–1	2–3	0–0	5–2
Berwick Rangers	3–1		2–1	3–0	0–0	1–4	1–1	2–0	1–1	4–1
Clyde	2–1	2–1		2–1	2–2	1–2	0–2	0–3	0–2	2–1
East Stirlingshire	2–2	0–1	3–0		1–4	2–2	2–1	0–2	2–6	3–1
Elgin City	2–2	3–1	2–1	3–4		6–1	2–0	0–4	2–6	3–1
Montrose	0–0	3–1	2–3	3–1	2–2		2–0	1–1	2–4	3–2
Peterhead	2–0	1–0	1–0	2–0	1–1	2–0		1–0	2–2	2–2
Queen's Park	2–2	1–1	1–0	1–2	1–1	2–2	0–0		0–1	2–1
Rangers	3–0	4–2	3–0	5–1	5–1	4–1	2–0	2–0		2–0
Stirling Albion	5–1	6–3	0–1	1–1	1–4	1–3	1–0	1–2	1–0	

Source: BBC Sport
Legend: Blue = home team win; Yellow = draw; Red = away team win.

=== Second half of season ===
Home \ Away	ANN	BER	CLY	EST	ELG	MON	PET	QPA	RAN	STI
Annan Athletic		2–2	0–1	1–2	2–2	1–1	0–0	2–0	1–3	0–1
Berwick Rangers	0–2		3–3	2–0	2–1	4–0	0–2	4–1	1–3	1–0
Clyde	2–3	2–1		2–0	1–1	1–0	2–0	2–3	1–4	1–2
East Stirlingshire	1–2	0–3	3–0		3–2	1–2	2–4	0–2	2–4	1–1
Elgin City	3–1	1–2	4–2	3–2		3–2	0–3	3–5	0–1	1–2
Montrose	5–1	1–3	1–1	2–2	4–1		0–6	1–2	0–0	2–2
Peterhead	2–0	1–1	3–0	6–0	0–1	0–1		0–2	0–1	0–0
Queen's Park	2–2	2–1	4–1	5–1	0–1	1–2	0–3		1–4	2–2
Rangers	1–2	1–0	2–0	3–1	1–1	1–1	1–2	4–0		0–0
Stirling Albion	2–1	1–0	2–0	9–1	1–1	3–1	0–1	2–3	1–1	

Updated to match(es) played on 4 May 2013. Source: BBC Sport
Legend: Blue = home team win; Yellow = draw; Red = away team win.

== Season statistics ==
=== Top goalscorers ===
As of 27 April 2013

Rank	Player	Club	Goals
1	(Northern Ireland) Andrew Little	Rangers	22
2	(Scotland) Rory McAllister	Peterhead	21
3	(Scotland) Darren Lavery	Berwick Rangers	17
3	(Scotland) Lee McCulloch	Rangers	17
5	(Scotland) David Templeton	Rangers	15
6	(Scotland) Stuart Leslie	Elgin City	14
7	(Scotland) Craig Gunn	Elgin City	13
7	(Scotland) Jordan White	Stirling Albion	13
9	(Scotland) Ally Love	Annan Athletic	12
10	(Scotland) Scott Chaplain	Annan Athletic	11
10	(Scotland) Lawrence Shankland	Queen's Park	11
