= 2011 HKFC International Soccer Sevens =

2011 HKFC International Soccer Sevens, officially known as The HKFC Citibank International Soccer Sevens due to sponsorship reason, is the 12th staging of this competition. It was held on 13–15 May 2011. In this year, the number of teams competing in Masters Tournament is reduced from 16 to 12.

== Squads ==
=== Masters tournament ===
Group A

- Nottingham Forest Mobsters: John Fawcett, Steve Guinan, Darren Heyes, Jon Olav Hjelde, Nigel Jemson, Dean Locke, Des Lyttle, Justin Walker, Darren Wassall, Alan Wright
- KFC Tokyo
- HKFC Chairman's Select
- Discovery Bay

Group B

- Citibank All Stars: Fraser Digby, John Beresford, Steve Howey, Des Walker, Rob Lee, Darren Currie, Craig Hignett, Tommy Mooney, Mark Kinsella, Keith Ryan
- Top Class FC: Tam Siu Wai, Chiu Chung Man, Yeung Hei Chi
- SCC Tigers
- Kowloon Cricket Club

Group C

- AC Milan Soccer Schools: Mustapha Hadji
- Team Bondi: Andrew Prentice, Luke Casserly, Craig Moore, Steve Walker, Tim Bredbury, Vladimir Zorić, Gary Braude, Scott Ollerenshaw, Brad Maloney, Phil Wolanski
- HKFC Veterans
- Bangkok Airways^{1}

Note 1: Replacing Shanghai Shooters

=== Main tournament ===
Group A

- Celtic F.C.: Bahrudin Atajić, Nick Feely, Patrik Twardzik, Marcus Fraser, Greig Spence, Joseph Chalmers, John Herron, Rhys Murrell-Williamson, Paul George, Liam Gormley
- Liverpool: Deale Chamberlain, Steven Irwin, Stephen Darby, Jakub Sokolik, Nathan Eccleston, David Amoo, Thomas Ince, Suso, Nikola Sarić, Nicolaj Køhlert
- Hong Kong u18s
- Yau Yee League Select

Group B

- Rangers F.C.: Archie Campbell, Gordon Dick, Rhys McCabe, Andrew Mitchell, Kal Naismith, Ross Perry, Robbie Crawford, Chris Hegarty, Ewan McNeil, Alan Smith
- Boca Juniors: Lucas Quispe, Javier Ruiz, Matias Krueger, Tomas Puentes, Matias Sosa, Lautaro Gauna, Agustin Rodriguez, Julian Argen, Lionel Caceres, Gabriel Munoz (Head Coach: Fernando Larrañaga)
- Hong Kong u21s: Liu Fu Yuen, Ma Siu Kwan, Wong Chui Shing, Li Shu Yeung, Yuen Tsun Tung, Yan Pak Long, Hung Jing Yip, Kot Cho Wai, Choi Kwok Wai, Nam Wing Hang
- Singapore Cricket Club

Group C

- Aston Villa: Shane Lowry, Jonathan Hogg, Eric Lichaj, Benjamin Siegrist, Nathan Baker, Chris Herd, Andreas Weimann, Ellis Deeney, Daniel Johnson, Harry Forrester
- Citizen: Tse Tak Him, Yeung Chi Lun, Fung Kai Hong, Tam Lok Hin, Paulinho, Chan Man Chun, Moses Mensah, Festus Baise, Sandro, Sham Kwok Fai
- Eastleigh FC
- HKFC Captain's Select: Ng Kwok Hei, Jack Sealy, Gergely Zoltan Gheczy, Martin Rainer, Poon Ka Ming, James Ha, Allan Fraser, Lo Yiu Hung, Liam Brannan, Michael Campion

Group D

- Ajax: Jordy Deckers, Henri Toivomäki, Ricardo van Rhijn, Johan Kappelhof, Dico Koppers, Lorenzo Burnet, Roly Bonevacia, Glenn van Zoolinger, Yener Arica, Tom Boere, Florian Jozefzoon (Coaches: Gery Vink, Yannis Anastasiou; Team Manager: Dick Schoenaker)
- Kitchee: Li Jian, Chan Man Fai, José María Díaz, Lam Ka Wai, Cheng Siu Wai, Dani Cancela, Fernando Recio, Roberto Losada, Lo Kwan Yee, Ubay Luzardo
- Fourway Rangers^{2}: Leung Hing Kit, Edson Minga, Iu Wai, Makhosonke Bhengu, Chak Ting Fung, Jean-Jacques Kilama, Lo Chi Kwan, Beto, Leung Wai Kit, John Emmanuel
- Hong Kong Football Club: Rudolf Hollaender, James Beacher, Seun Ologkigbe Tunde, Reda Chaouch, Nicklas Sandor, Frederik Schipper, Kwok Kar Lok, Amro Abbas, Kento Kurasako, Chung Tsz Fung

Note 2: Replacing Etoile FC

== Main Tournament - Group Stage ==
Key to colours in group tables
Teams that progressed to the Cup Quarter-finals
Teams that progressed to the Plate Quarter-finals

=== Group A ===
| Team | Pld | W | D | L | GF | GA | GD | Pts |
|---|---|---|---|---|---|---|---|---|
| Liverpool | 3 | 3 | 0 | 0 | 7 | 0 | +7 | 9 |
| Celtic | 3 | 2 | 0 | 1 | 4 | 3 | +1 | 6 |
| Yau Yee League Select | 3 | 1 | 0 | 2 | 2 | 5 | -3 | 3 |
| Hong Kong u18s | 3 | 0 | 0 | 3 | 0 | 5 | -5 | 0 |

14 May 2011
15:14

| Liverpool | 1 – 0 | Hong Kong u18s |

Hong Kong Football Club Stadium

14 May 2011
15:31

| Celtic | 2 – 0 | Yau Yee League Select |

Hong Kong Football Club Stadium

14 May 2011
16:56

| Liverpool | 3 – 0 | Yau Yee League Select |

Hong Kong Football Club Stadium

14 May 2011
17:13

| Celtic | 2 – 0 | Hong Kong u18s |

Hong Kong Football Club Stadium

14 May 2011
18:21

| Hong Kong u18s | 0 – 2 | Yau Yee League Select |

Hong Kong Football Club Stadium

14 May 2011
18:55

| Celtic | 0 – 3 | Liverpool |

Hong Kong Football Club Stadium

=== Group B ===
| Team | Pld | W | D | L | GF | GA | GD | Pts |
|---|---|---|---|---|---|---|---|---|
| Rangers | 3 | 3 | 0 | 0 | 6 | 0 | +6 | 9 |
| Boca Juniors | 3 | 1 | 1 | 1 | 2 | 2 | 0 | 4 |
| Singapore Cricket Club | 3 | 0 | 2 | 1 | 1 | 2 | -1 | 2 |
| Hong Kong u21s | 3 | 0 | 1 | 2 | 0 | 5 | -5 | 1 |

14 May 2011
14:40

| Boca Juniors | 1 – 0 | Hong Kong u21s |

Hong Kong Football Club Stadium

14 May 2011
14:57

| Rangers | 1 – 0 | Singapore Cricket Club |

Hong Kong Football Club Stadium

14 May 2011
16:22

| Boca Juniors | 1 – 1 | Singapore Cricket Club |

Hong Kong Football Club Stadium

14 May 2011
16:39

| Rangers | 4 – 0 | Hong Kong u21s |

Hong Kong Football Club Stadium

14 May 2011
18:04

| Hong Kong u21s | 0 – 0 | Singapore Cricket Club |

Hong Kong Football Club Stadium

14 May 2011
18:38

| Rangers | 1 – 0 | Boca Juniors |

Hong Kong Football Club Stadium

=== Group C ===
| Team | Pld | W | D | L | GF | GA | GD | Pts |
|---|---|---|---|---|---|---|---|---|
| Aston Villa | 3 | 3 | 0 | 0 | 9 | 0 | +9 | 9 |
| Citizen | 3 | 1 | 1 | 1 | 2 | 3 | -1 | 4 |
| HKFC Captain's Select | 3 | 1 | 1 | 1 | 2 | 5 | -3 | 4 |
| Eastleigh FC | 3 | 0 | 0 | 3 | 0 | 5 | -5 | 0 |

14 May 2011
09:42

| Citizen | 1 – 0 | Eastleigh FC |

Hong Kong Football Club Stadium

14 May 2011
09:59

| Aston Villa | 4 – 0 | HKFC Captain's Select |
|---|---|---|
| Forrester 1' 11'; Weimann 4' ?' | (Report) |

Hong Kong Football Club Stadium

14 May 2011
11:24

| Citizen | 1 – 1 | HKFC Captain's Select |

Hong Kong Football Club Stadium

14 May 2011
11:41

| Aston Villa | 3 – 0 | Eastleigh FC |
|---|---|---|
| Forrester; Weimann | (Report) |

Hong Kong Football Club Stadium

14 May 2011
12:49

| Eastleigh FC | 0 – 1 | HKFC Captain's Select |

Hong Kong Football Club Stadium

14 May 2011
13:23

| Aston Villa | 2 – 0 | Citizen |
|---|---|---|
| Weimann; Hogg | (Report) |

Hong Kong Football Club Stadium

=== Group D ===
| Team | Pld | W | D | L | GF | GA | GD | Pts |
|---|---|---|---|---|---|---|---|---|
| Ajax | 3 | 1 | 2 | 0 | 6 | 2 | +4 | 5 |
| Kitchee | 3 | 1 | 2 | 0 | 3 | 2 | +1 | 5 |
| Fourway Rangers | 3 | 1 | 1 | 1 | 3 | 3 | 0 | 4 |
| Hong Kong Football Club | 3 | 0 | 1 | 2 | 2 | 7 | -5 | 1 |

14 May 2011
09:08

| Kitchee | 1 – 0 | Fourway Rangers |

Hong Kong Football Club Stadium

11 May 2011
09:25

| Ajax | 4 – 0 | Hong Kong Football Club |

Hong Kong Football Club Stadium

14 May 2011
10:50

| Kitchee | 1 – 1 | Hong Kong Football Club |

Hong Kong Football Club Stadium

14 May 2011
11:07

| Ajax | 1 – 1 | Fourway Rangers |

Hong Kong Football Club Stadium

14 May 2011
12:32

| Fourway Rangers | 2 – 1 | Hong Kong Football Club |

Hong Kong Football Club Stadium

14 May 2011
13:06

| Ajax | 1 – 1 | Kitchee |

Hong Kong Football Club Stadium

== Main Tournament - Knockout Stage ==
Knockout stage was held on 15 May 2011.

=== Plate ===
- Bottom two teams of each group entered the quarter-finals of Plate.

Quarterfinals
A3 | Yau Yee League Select | 0
C4 | Eastleigh FC | 1
B3 | Singapore Cricket Club | 1
D4 | Hong Kong Football Club | 0
C3 | HKFC Captain's Select (pen.) | 0
A4 | Hong Kong u18s | 0
D3 | Fourway Rangers | 0
B4 | Hong Kong u21s | 1

Semifinals
C4 | Eastleigh FC | 0
B3 | Singapore Cricket Club | 2
C3 | HKFC Captain's Select | 1
B4 | Hong Kong u21s | 0

Finals
B3 | Singapore Cricket Club | 2
C3 | HKFC Captain's Select (pen.) | 2

=== Shield ===
- Losing teams of Cup quarter-finals entered the semi-finals of Shield.

Quarterfinals
A1 | Liverpool | 2
C2 | Citizen | 1
B1 | Rangers | 0
D2 | Kitchee | 2
C1 | Aston Villa | 0 (1)
A2 | Celtic (pen.) | 0 (3)
D1 | Ajax (e.x.t.) | 0 (1)
B2 | Boca Juniors | 0 (0)

Semifinals
C2 | Citizen | 1
B1 | Rangers | 0
C1 | Aston Villa | 5
B2 | Boca Juniors | 0

Finals
C2 | Citizen | 1
C1 | Aston Villa | 0

=== Cup ===
- Top two teams of each group entered the quarter-finals of Cup.

Quarterfinals
A1 | Liverpool | 2
C2 | Citizen | 1
B1 | Rangers | 0
D2 | Kitchee | 2
C1 | Aston Villa | 0 (1)
A2 | Celtic (pen.) | 0 (3)
D1 | Ajax (e.x.t.) | 0 (1)
B2 | Boca Juniors | 0 (0)

Semifinals
A1 | Liverpool | 1 (1)
D2 | Kitchee (e.x.t.) | 1 (2)
A2 | Celtic (e.x.t.) | 0 (1)
D1 | Ajax | 0 (0)

Finals
D2 | Kitchee | 1
A2 | Celtic | 0
