= List of Rangers F.C. chairmen =

Rangers F.C. is a football club based in Glasgow, Scotland, that competes in the Scottish Professional Football League. Since its founding in 1872, the club has had more than ten different presidents (prior to incorporation) and twenty-seven chairmen.

== History ==
The club has been privately owned by stakeholders, in the form of a limited liability company before becoming a publicly owned company trading on the PLUS and AIM stock exchanges respectively. The board of directors are appointed to oversee the corporate operations of the company that owns the club with the chairman being considered as the most senior and high-profile corporate figures. In Rangers history the chairman has generally been the prominent executive on the board, although this has begun to change with the appointment of CEOs which led to some chairmen being appointed in a non-executive capacity.

From December 2012 to March 2015, the directors of the company that owns Rangers F.C., The Rangers Football Club Limited (TRFCL), were appointed to what was then known as the "football board". This football board was separate and distinct from the Plc board of Rangers International Football Club Plc (RIFC), which is the holding company of TRFCL. During this period, references were made to both the football board and Plc board and the situation effectively saw the club with two chairmen, however, since the departure of Sandy Easdale in 2015, the "football board" terminology has ceased leaving the Plc chair as the definitive Chairman.

Between June and December 2012, before flotation on the AIM stock exchange and the subsequent formation of RIFC, the chairman of TRFCL was de jure the chairman of Rangers Football Club.

== List of presidents ==
Below is the presidential history of Rangers F.C., from 1874 until incorporation sixteen years later.

Name	From	To
(Scotland) William McBeath	1874	1875
(Scotland) Unknown	1875	1876
(Scotland) James McBlane Watt	1876	1877
(Scotland) Unknown	1877	1881
(Scotland) Archibald Harkness	1881	November 1882
(Scotland) George Goudie	November 1882	May 1883
(Scotland) Tom Vallance	May 1883	1889
(Scotland) Unknown	1899	1890
(Scotland) James Watson	1890	1891
(Scotland) Dugald Mackenzie	1891	1896
(Scotland) John Robertson Gow	1896	1898
(Scotland) James Henderson	1898	1 June 1899

== List of chairmen ==
Below is the official chairmen history of Rangers F.C., from the incorporation of the club in 1899, until the present day.

=== t/a Rangers F.C. Ltd (1899) and Rangers F.C. Plc (2000) ===
Name	From	To	Tenure
(Scotland) James Henderson	1 June 1899	10 May 1912	12 years, 344 days
(Scotland) Sir John Ure Primrose	1912	July 1923	11 years
(Scotland) William Craig	July 1923	20 November 1923	142 days
(Scotland) Joseph Buchanan	November 1923	October 1932	9 years
(Scotland) Duncan Graham	1932	January 1934	2 years
(Scotland) James Bowie	January 1934	12 June 1947	13 years
(Scotland) W. Rodgers Simpson	27 June 1947	April 1949	1 year, 307 days
(Scotland) John Wilson	April 1949	12 February 1963	13 years, 288 days
(Scotland) John Lawrence	12 February 1963	19 June 1973	10 years, 127 days
(Scotland) Matt Taylor	19 June 1973	September, 1975	2 years
(Scotland) Rae Simpson	September, 1975	10 January 1984	8 years, 131 days
(Scotland) John Paton	10 January 1984	11 November 1986	2 years, 305 days
(Scotland) David Holmes	11 November 1986	2 June 1989	2 years, 203 days
(Scotland) David Murray	2 June 1989	5 July 2002	13 years, 33 days
(Scotland) John McClelland	5 July 2002	1 September 2004	2 years, 58 days
(Scotland) David Murray	1 September 2004	24 August 2009	4 years, 357 days
(Scotland) Alastair Johnston	24 August 2009	24 May 2011	1 year, 273 days
(Scotland) Craig Whyte	24 May 2011	14 February 2012	266 days
c/o Duff & Phelps	14 February 2012	14 June 2012	121 days

=== t/a Rangers F.C. Ltd (2012) ===
Name	From	To	Tenure
(Scotland) Malcolm Murray	14 June 2012	18 December 2012	187 days
n/a	18 December 2012	13 December 2013	360 days
(Scotland) Sandy Easdale	13 December 2013	11 March 2015	1 year, 88 days

=== t/a Rangers International F.C. Plc (2012) ===
Name	From	To	Tenure
(Scotland) Malcolm Murray	7 December 2012	30 May 2013	174 days
(Scotland) Walter Smith	30 May 2013	5 August 2013	67 days
n/a	5 August 2013	7 November 2013	183 days
(England) David Somers	7 November 2013	2 March 2015	1 year, 88 days
(Scotland) Paul Murray	6 March 2015	22 May 2015	77 days
(Scotland) Dave King	22 May 2015	27 March 2020	4 years, 310 days
(Scotland) Douglas Park	27 March 2020	4 April 2023	3 years, 8 days
(Scotland) John Bennett	4 April 2023	14 September 2024	1 year, 163 days
(Scotland) John Gilligan	14 September 2024	16 December 2024	93 days
(Scotland) Fraser Thornton	16 December 2024	30 May 2025	165 days
(United States) Andrew Cavenagh	30 May 2025		1 year, 122 days

== List of honorary positions ==
Name	Position	From	To	Tenure
(Scotland) John Ure Primrose	Honorary President	1888	1912	24 years
(Scotland) John Lawrence	Honorary President	19 June 1973	26 January 1977	3 years, 221 days
(Scotland) David Murray	Honorary Chairman	4 July 2002	1 September 2004	2 years, 59 days
(Scotland) John Greig	Honorary President	23 May 2015		11 years, 129 days
