= 2013–14 Rangers F.C. season =

Rangers
2013–14 season
- Chairman: Malcolm Murray (until 30 May); Walter Smith (from 30 May) (until 5 August); David Somers (from 7 November)
- Manager: Ally McCoist
- Ground: Ibrox Stadium; Glasgow, Scotland (Capacity: 50,987)
- Scottish League One: 1st (Promoted)
- Scottish Cup: Semi-finals
- League Cup: First round
- Challenge Cup: Runners-up
- Top goalscorer: League: Jon Daly (20); All: Jon Daly (25)
- Highest home attendance: 46,093 vs Stranraer (26 April)
- Lowest home attendance: 16,097 vs Berwick Rangers (27 August)
Home colours	Away colours

The 2013–14 season was the 134th season of competitive football by Rangers.

This was their only season in the third tier, after winning promotion the previous season.

== Overview ==
Rangers played a total of 48 competitive matches during the 2013–14 season.

Rangers preceded their 2013–14 campaign with a tour of the north of Scotland, followed by a training camp in Germany. The club played two friendlies against continental opposition before returning to the United Kingdom to play English side Sheffield Wednesday at Hillsborough Stadium. Rangers concluded their pre-season campaign with a 1–1 draw against Newcastle United at Ibrox Stadium. The club began the season still under the year-long transfer embargo, meaning that several players signed during the summer could not be registered under the end of the window, although the club sought clarification on this after Heart of Midlothian received what appeared to be a lesser punishment for going into administration. Despite this the club confirmed several players on pre-contract agreements, many of which on lucrative contracts. Due to rules permitting trialists to play as amateurs in the league and Challenge Cup, several footballers made their Rangers debut during the month of August. The Scottish League One campaign began at Ibrox Stadium with a 4–1 win over Brechin City and the side embarked upon a run of fifteen straight wins in the league, claiming their twentieth successive win in all competitions by beating Ayr United on 7 December. It was not until Boxing Day that season that the club dropped a point in the league by drawing 1–1 at home to Stranraer, who scored a ninety-fourth-minute equaliser. The side claimed the League One title on 12 March at Ibrox Stadium by defeating Airdrieonians 3–0, thanks to a Lee McCulloch hat-trick, having won 26 of their 28 league matches without suffering defeat. Indeed, the side was to go through the rest of the campaign unbeaten, finishing the season with a draw away to Dunfermline Athletic, only their third in the league that season and matching a 115-year-old record from the Rangers side of 1898–99 season. Away from the league, the side did not fare well suffering defeat in the League Cup to Forfar Athletic at the beginning of the season, a drab Challenge Cup final loss against Raith Rovers and, despite a lively, committed performance, a Scottish Cup semi-final defeat by Dundee United.

Off the field issues continued to overshadow the team, although initially things seemed to have pacified when former manager Walter Smith was appointed as chairman of the Plc board in May, however, he lasted less than two months before resigning. Smith's departure coincided with the return of former Chief executive Charles Green in a consultant capacity. Green became embroiled in a row with Rangers manager Ally McCoist after her suggested that McCoist had to win a cup as well as League One that season to save his job. Ultimately, Green's influence was seen to be more damaging than positive and he agreed to resign his position and sell his remaining shares in the club to Sandy Easdale. A second former board member, Imran Ahmad, also sold his remaining shares in the club as it was reported he was preparing to sue the club for £3.4m in unpaid bonus money. Meanwhile, a group of Rangers shareholders, led by former director Paul Murray, requisitioned an EGM to vote on the removal of Plc board directors including chief executive Craig Mather. This was partly the result of shareholders being concerned over Mather's £500,000 annual salary. The Rangers board opening negotiations with the requisitioners in late August to delay the EGM and combine it with AGM business and after prolonged and fictitious meetings the requisitioners withdrew the request for an EGM. Nevertheless, the requisitioners were not to be deterred and wrote to Rangers with a proposal to have four new directors appointed at the AGM, however the board failed to put this motion on the agenda forcing the requisitioners to seek an interim interdict in order for a new agenda to be sent out thus delaying the AGM.

The club's financial results were announced at the start of October with an operating loss of £14m in the thirteen months to June 2013, with the revelation that the club spends more on non-playing staff than on the squad. This led to discussions between Mather and former Rangers director Dave King over the latter's potential investment in the club and Rangers manager, Ally McCoist agreeing to take a substantial pay-cut. Mather's meeting with King caused unease in the Rangers boardroom and was thought to be the reason behind his removal as chief executive on 16 October leaving only two directors on the Plc board. The lack of corporate governance was criticised by Rangers nominated adviser and led to the appointment of David Somers as non-executive director and acting chairman a few weeks later. On the same day as Somers' appointment, the date for the AGM was set for 19 December. This instigated an arms race between warring factions for control of Rangers. In the five weeks prior to the AGM, the board proceeded to appoint Norman Crighton as non-executive director, Graham Wallace as the new chief executive and confirmed Somers as permanent chairman, much to the bemusement of the requisitioners who questioned the appointments so close to the AGM. Around this time, going perhaps unnoticed, was the news that Police Scotland was investigating whether former owner Craig Whyte was still involved at Rangers as well as the acquisition and management of the club. Perhaps the most important machinations involved moves by the board to secure support from other shareholders and their voting rights, with the largest single shareholder Laxey Partners indicating its support for the current board at the AGM. A week before the AGM it was clear that the board had amassed a sizeable proportion of voting rights, which ultimately, saw them re-elected and the requisitioners defeated.

Upon his re-election, Wallace indicated his intention to undertake a three-month review of the club's business operations and it was revealed this included cuts to the first-team wage budget. The Rangers manager signed off on a wage reduction on 11 January, the same day as the club hired Philip Nash as a financial consultant to assist with the business review. Following this the club unsuccessfully asked the first-team squad to take pay cuts of around 15% until summer 2015 and as greater scrutiny was focused on the club's finances, Rangers financial director Brian Stockbridge resigned on 24 January. Indeed, in early February Wallace was forced to deny claims that the club was on the brink of a second insolvency event, however, two-weeks later Rangers borrowed £1.5m from shareholders Sandy Easdale and Laxey Partners for working capital. The loan agreement was widely criticised, as Laxey Partners stood to make £150,000 in either interest or shares by the time it was repaid and also the Albion Car Park and Edmiston House were being used as collateral. Despite this, prior to his court case, former director Imran Ahmad had failed to ring-fence cash at the club ahead of his now £500,000 lawsuit.

Nevertheless, concerns over the club's money issues lingered and led Dave King to suggest fans withhold season ticket money until they receive assurances from the board. This caused a war of words between King and the board with Wallace criticising the boycott call suggesting it could be damaging to the club however, a coalition of Rangers fans groups known as the Union of Fans, supported King's stance on withholding season ticket money. King and the supporters groups were planning to meet in order to formalise legal structures for trusts into which fans could put future season ticket money. This caused the Rangers board to demand that King attend a board meeting where he would explain his recent comments and the following day the club revealed it was considering an alternative loan offer on better terms than Laxey Partners from businessman George Letham. King agreed to this meeting and during a spell in Scotland in mid March, he met with several institutional investors including Laxey Partners, as well as the Union of Fans and the Plc board. The outcome from the Union of Fans meeting was an agreement for the pooling of season ticket renewal money in a trust fund which would only be released to the club when the group was granted security over Ibrox Stadium and Rangers Training Centre, however, upon meeting with the board King was informed the club had no intention of using Ibrox or Murray Park for securities on any borrowing. Upon the conclusion of the board meeting, there was an act of good faith on King's part, in which he agreed to a four-week grace period to allow the club to complete and publish a business review of the company, after which King would decide upon continuing with any further action. Whilst agreeing to the grace period, the Union of Fans did decide to press ahead with plans to create a season ticket trust fund. Towards the end of March, the club accepted the loan offer from Letham on the same day as King pledged to invest up to £50m of his own money in the club. However, the reality of Rangers financial predicament was laid bare just two days later by the publishing of the interim accounts, which reported losses of £3.5m in the six months to 31 December and showed cash reserves had fallen from £21.2m to £3.5m.

Despite the good faith shown by King, the Rangers board proceeded with the season ticket renewal campaign at the beginning of April, before the business review was concluded. This soured the relationship between the Rangers board and King and ended negotiations, with the latter accusing the club of deliberately delaying the publishing of the review until after the renewal period and the Union of Fans remained aligned with King. Indeed, the fans group demanded the board reveal details of the executive bonus entitlements, which it refused to do. Around the same time, Rangers announced a three-year agreement with online casino company 32Red to be the club's new shirt sponsor. On the eve of the business review's publication it was reported that Rangers second highest appearance maker Sandy Jardine had died aged just 65 after a long battle with throat cancer. There was a high degree of anticipation surrounding the review with journalists noting an eight-day delay and the fans hopes for detail and clarity regarding the boards future plans while Rangers director Sandy Easdale acknowledged that the club financial situation was fragile. Upon its publication the review stated the club needed to raise £30m by 2017, including a new share issue, for it to compete in the top league and the board aimed to make the business sustainable by season 2015/16 but required savings to be made including staff redundancies. Issues regarding financial mismanagement by the board came to light from the review including £2m which was spent on stadium Wi-Fi, LED displays and jumbo screens that were deemed "non-essential" and that players were signed during the summer which executives should have known the club could not afford.

Following on from the publication of the business review, Police Scotland investigated a complaint from a Rangers shareholder against Wallace regarding alleged misleading statements that he made about the club's finances at December's AGM. This led to calls from the Union of Fans for Wallace to be suspended pending the outcome of the investigation while Dave King demanded the police probe be extended to include all of the Rangers board. Despite the admissions arising from the business review, Imran Ahmad was again unsuccessful in an attempt to have money frozen in the club's accounts pending the outcome of his litigation against the club, however, there was indications a third attempt might be successful as King and former club captain Richard Gough set up the Ibrox 1972 Fund for fans to pay season ticket money into. This move appeared to make the board more receptive to granting the Union of Fans a legally-binding undertaking protecting Ibrox Stadium and the training centre, however, this proposal was again rejected by the board a few days later. The club admitted that season ticket renewals had been slow, but were reluctant to provide details despite fan protests against the board, and demands from fans group to reveal how many season tickets have been sold. Further to this, former Rangers defender and youth coach John Brown delivered a 7,000 signature petition calling for the board to protect the club's property assets. The beginning of May, saw Sandy Easdale increase his shareholding to 4.61%, while retaining proxy over a further 22.10%, leaving him as the second most prominent shareholder at the club after Laxey Partners by the summer of 2014. Despite the deputes with fans, withholding of season ticket money and precarious financial position, Wallace still went on to state he believed the club to be in a "good place".

== Players ==
=== Squad information ===
Pos.	Nat.	Name	Age	Since	App	Goals	Ends	Transfer fee	Notes
GK	(Scotland)	Cammy Bell	27	2013	39	0	2017	Free	
GK	(Scotland)	Scott Gallacher	24	2006	6	0	2015	Youth system	
GK	(Republic of Ireland)	Alan Smith	20	2010	0	0	2014	Free	
GK	(England)	Steve Simonsen	35	2013	3	0	2014	Free	
DF	(Scotland)	Kyle McAusland	21	2010	7	0	2015	Youth system	
DF	(Greece)	Anestis Argyriou	25	2012	27	0	2014	Free	left on 18 September
DF	(Scotland)	Richard Foster	28	2013	54	0	2015	Free	
DF	(Scotland)	Darren Cole	21	2008	5	0	2014	Youth system	left on 28 August
DF	(Brazil)	Emílson Cribari	34	2012	42	0	2014	Free	
DF	(Tunisia)	Bilel Mohsni	26	2013	37	12	2015	Free	
DF	(France)	Sébastien Faure	23	2012	57	1	2015	Free	
DF	(Scotland)	Ross Perry	24	2006	36	0	2015	Youth system	
DF	(Northern Ireland)	Chris Hegarty	21	2010	31	1	2015	Free	
DF	(Canada)	Luca Gasparotto	18	2011	4	0	2015	Free	
DF	(Scotland)	Craig Halkett	18	2011	0	0	2015	Youth system	
DF	(Scotland)	Lee Wallace (Vice-captain)	26	2011	115	9	2016	£1.5m	
DF	(Scotland)	Steven Smith	28	2013	91	4	2015	Free	
MF	(Scotland)	Lewis Macleod	19	2010	55	8	2017	Youth system	
MF	(Scotland)	Robbie Crawford	21	2010	52	7	2017	Youth system	
MF	(Scotland)	Andy Murdoch	19	2011	2	0	2015	Youth system	
MF	(Scotland)	Charlie Telfer	18	2011	1	0	2014	Youth system	
MF	(Scotland)	Ian Black	29	2012	80	5	2015	Free	
MF	(Scotland)	Kyle Hutton	23	2008	60	2	2014	Youth system	
MF	(Northern Ireland)	Andrew Mitchell	21	2010	10	0	2014	Free	left on 17 January
MF	(Northern Ireland)	Dean Shiels	29	2012	51	23	2016	Free	
MF	(England)	Nicky Law	26	2013	42	12	2016	Free	
MF	(Scotland)	David Templeton	25	2012	55	22	2016	£0.7m	
MF	(Canada)	Fraser Aird	19	2011	59	10	2018	Youth system	
MF	(Scotland)	Lee McCulloch (captain)	35	2007	257	64	2015	£2.25m	
MF	(Scotland)	Barrie McKay	19	2011	46	5	2017	Free	
MF	(Honduras)	Arnold Peralta	25	2013	26	1	2017	Free	
FW	(Scotland)	Kal Naismith	21	2008	24	3	2015	Youth system	left on 10 August
FW	(Republic of Ireland)	Jon Daly	31	2013	44	25	2015	Free	
FW	(Northern Ireland)	Andrew Little	24	2007	89	38	2014	Youth system	
FW	(Scotland)	Nicky Clark	22	2013	30	9	2016	Free	
FW	(Scotland)	Calum Gallagher	19	2010	6	1	2016	Youth system	

- Last updated: 3 May 2014
- Source: Players transfer and Wikipedia players' articles
- Ordered by position on pitch.

=== Transfers ===
==== In ====
Pos.	Nat.	Name	Age	Moving from	Type	Transfer window	Ends	Transfer fee	Source
GK	(Scotland)	Cammy Bell	26	Kilmarnock	Transfer	Summer	2017	Free	
MF	(England)	Nicky Law	25	Motherwell	Transfer	Summer	2016	Free	
FW	(Republic of Ireland)	Jon Daly	30	Dundee United	Transfer	Summer	2015	Free	
FW	(Scotland)	Nicky Clark	22	Queen of the South	Transfer	Summer	2016	Free	
MF	(Honduras)	Arnold Peralta	24	Vida (Honduras)	Transfer	Summer	2016	Free	
DF	(Scotland)	Steven Smith	28	Portland Timbers (United States)	Transfer	Summer	2015	Free	
DF	(Scotland)	Richard Foster	28	Bristol City (England)	Transfer	Summer	2015	Free	
DF	(Tunisia)	Bilel Mohsni	26	Southend United (England)	Transfer	Summer	2015	Free	
GK	(England)	Steve Simonsen	34	Dundee	Transfer	n/a	2014	Free	
DF	(Scotland)	Ryan Finnie	19	Hamilton Academical	Transfer	n/a	2014	Free	

Total expenditure: £0m

==== Out ====
Pos.	Nat.	Name	Age	Moving to	Type	Transfer window	Transfer fee	Source
GK	(Scotland)	Neil Alexander	35	Crystal Palace (England)	End of contract	Summer	Free	
FW	(England)	Kane Hemmings	22	Cowdenbeath	End of contract	Summer	Free	
GK	(Scotland)	Blair Currie	19	Hamilton Academical	End of contract	Summer	Free	
DF	(Scotland)	Gregor Fotheringham	18	East Fife	End of contract	Summer	Free	
DF	(Northern Ireland)	Matthew Clarke	19	Linfield (Northern Ireland)	End of contract	Summer	Free	
MF	(England)	Travis Gregory	17	Free agent	End of contract	Summer	Free	
DF	(Scotland)	Jordan Wilson	18	Free agent	End of contract	Summer	Free	
FW	(Democratic Republic of the Congo)	Glody N’Tumba	17	Free agent	End of contract	Summer	Free	
FW	(Russia)	Sergey Kundik	17	Braga (Portugal)	End of contract	Summer	Free	
DF	(Scotland)	Stuart Urquhart	18	Coventry City (England)	End of contract	Summer	Free	
DF	(United States)	Carlos Bocanegra	34	Chivas USA (United States)	Contract terminated	Summer	n/a	
DF	(Romania)	Dorin Goian	32	Asteras Tripolis (Greece)	Contract terminated	Summer	n/a	
FW	(Scotland)	Kal Naismith	21	Accrington Stanley (England)	Contract terminated	Summer	n/a	
DF	(Scotland)	Darren Cole	21	Greenock Morton	Contract terminated	Summer	n/a	
DF	(Northern Ireland)	Andrew Mitchell	21	Annan Athletic	Loan	n/a	n/a	
DF	(Scotland)	Scott Gallacher	24	Airdrieonians	Loan	n/a	n/a	
DF	(Greece)	Anestis Argyriou	25	Zawisza Bydgoszcz (Poland)	Contract terminated	n/a	n/a	
DF	(Scotland)	Kyle McAusland	20	Ayr United	Loan	n/a	n/a	
FW	(Scotland)	Calum Gallagher	19	East Stirlingshire	Loan	n/a	n/a	
DF	(Canada)	Luca Gasparotto	18	Stirling Albion	Loan	n/a	n/a	
MF	(Scotland)	Barrie McKay	18	Greenock Morton	Loan	n/a	n/a	
GK	(Scotland)	Jamie Wilson	16	Dunfermline Athletic	Transfer	Winter	Free	
MF	(Northern Ireland)	Andrew Mitchell	21	Annan Athletic	Contract terminated	Winter	n/a	

Last updated: 17 January 2014
Total income: £0m

==== New Contracts ====
Pos.	Nat.	Name	Age	Status	Contract length	Expiry date	Source
MF	(Northern Ireland)	Andrew Mitchell	21	Signed	1 year	June 2014	
DF	(Scotland)	Darren Cole	21	Signed	1 year	June 2014	
FW	(Northern Ireland)	Andrew Little	24	Talks abandoned	2 years	June 2015	
FW	(Scotland)	Calum Gallagher	19	Signed	2 years	June 2016	

Last updated: 21 April 2014

=== Squad statistics ===
			Total			Scottish League One		Scottish Cup		League Cup		Challenge Cup		Notes
Pos.	Nat.	Name	Sts	App	Gls	App	Gls	App	Gls	App	Gls	App	Gls	Notes
GK	(Scotland)	Cammy Bell	39	39		31		5				3		Featured as trialist
GK	(Scotland)	Scott Gallacher	6	6		3				1		2		
GK	(England)	Steve Simonsen	3	3		2		1						
DF	(Scotland)	Richard Foster	26	30		23		4				3		
DF	(Scotland)	Kyle McAusland	5	7		4				1		2		
DF	(Northern Ireland)	Chris Hegarty	2	2	1	1	1			1				
DF	(France)	Sébastien Faure	27	35		26		4		1		4		
DF	(Tunisia)	Bilel Mohsni	37	37	12	28	10	6	1			3	1	
DF	(Brazil)	Emílson Cribari	5	8		7						1		
DF	(Scotland)	Lee McCulloch	46	46	18	34	17	6		1		5	1	
DF	(Scotland)	Lee Wallace	39	39	3	28	3	5		1		5		
DF	(Scotland)	Steven Smith	14	16	3	13	2	1	1			2		
MF	(Scotland)	Ian Black	42	42	3	32	2	5		1		4	1	
MF	(Scotland)	Robbie Crawford	10	25	2	20	2	1		1		3		
MF	(Canada)	Fraser Aird	27	37	7	27	5	6	1	1	1	3		
MF	(Scotland)	Andy Murdoch		1		1								
MF	(Honduras)	Arnold Peralta	22	26	1	20	1	4				2		
MF	(England)	Nicky Law	42	42	12	32	9	6	1			4	2	Featured as trialist
MF	(Scotland)	Lewis Macleod	22	24	5	18	5	2		1		3		
MF	(Northern Ireland)	Andrew Mitchell	1	1						1				
MF	(Scotland)	David Templeton	13	29	7	20	3	4	3	1		4	1	
MF	(Scotland)	Kyle Hutton	5	13		10		2				1		
MF	(Scotland)	Charlie Telfer		1		1								
FW	(Northern Ireland)	Andrew Little	17	29	6	21	5	3		1		4	1	
FW	(Northern Ireland)	Dean Shiels	17	22	11	18	8	3	3			1		
FW	(Republic of Ireland)	Jon Daly	44	44	25	34	20	6	3			4	2	Featured as trialist
FW	(Scotland)	Barrie McKay		4	1	2				1		1	1	
FW	(Scotland)	Nicky Clark	16	30	9	23	9	4				3		Featured as trialist
FW	(Scotland)	Calum Gallagher	2	6	1	4	1	1				1		

Last updated: 3 May 2014
Source: Wikipedia article
Ordered by position
0 shown as blank

=== Goal scorers ===
P	Nat.	Name	League	Scottish Cup	League Cup	Challenge Cup	Total
FW	(Republic of Ireland)	Jon Daly	20	3		2	25
DF	(Scotland)	Lee McCulloch	17			1	18
MF	(England)	Nicky Law	9	1		2	12
DF	(Tunisia)	Bilel Mohsni	10	1		1	12
FW	(Northern Ireland)	Dean Shiels	8	3			11
FW	(Scotland)	Nicky Clark	9				9
MF	(Scotland)	David Templeton	3	3		1	7
MF	(Canada)	Fraser Aird	5	1	1		7
FW	(Northern Ireland)	Andrew Little	5			1	6
MF	(Scotland)	Lewis Macleod	5				5
DF	(Scotland)	Lee Wallace	3				3
MF	(Scotland)	Ian Black	2			1	3
DF	(Scotland)	Steven Smith	2	1			3
MF	(Scotland)	Robbie Crawford	2				2
FW	(Scotland)	Barrie McKay				1	1
DF	(Northern Ireland)	Chris Hegarty	1				1
FW	(Scotland)	Calum Gallagher	1				1
MF	(Honduras)	Arnold Peralta	1				1
		Own goal	2				2

- Last updated: 3 May 2014
- Source: Match reports
- Only competitive matches

=== Disciplinary record ===
P	Nat.	Name	YC	Yellow card Red card	RC
DF	(Scotland)	Lee McCulloch	8		
DF	(Northern Ireland)	Chris Hegarty	1		
DF	(Tunisia)	Bilel Mohsni	10	1	
DF	(Scotland)	Richard Foster	5		
DF	(Scotland)	Steven Smith	2		
MF	(Scotland)	Lewis Macleod	1		
MF	(Honduras)	Arnold Peralta	5		1
MF	(Scotland)	Ian Black	13		
MF	(England)	Nicky Law	3		
MF	(Scotland)	David Templeton	4		
FW	(Republic of Ireland)	Jon Daly	3		
DF	(France)	Sébastien Faure	3		
MF	(Canada)	Fraser Aird	1		
FW	(Northern Ireland)	Andrew Little	1		
DF	(Scotland)	Lee Wallace	1		
DF	(Brazil)	Emilson Cribari	1		
MF	(Scotland)	Kyle Hutton	1		
FW	(Scotland)	Nicky Clark	1		
FW	(Northern Ireland)	Dean Shiels	1		

- Last updated: 3 May 2014
- Source: Match reports
- Only competitive matches

=== Awards ===
P	Nat.	Name	Award	Date	From
MAN	(Scotland)	Ally McCoist	League One Manager of the Month	September	Scottish Professional Football League
MAN	(Scotland)	Ally McCoist	League One Manager of the Month	January	Scottish Professional Football League

== Club ==
=== Board of directors ===
Position	Staff
Chairman	(Scotland) Malcolm Murray (until 30 May) (Scotland) Walter Smith (from 30 May) (until 5 August) (England) David Somers (from 7 November)
Chief executive	(England) Craig Mather (until 16 October) (Scotland) Graham Wallace (from 20 November)
Finance director	(England) Brian Stockbridge (until 24 January)
Non-executive director	(Scotland) Walter Smith (until 30 May)
Non-executive director	(Scotland) Ian Hart (until 10 October)
Non-executive director	(England) Philip Cartmell (until 9 July)
Non-executive director	(England) Bryan Smart (until 16 October)
Non-executive director	(Scotland) Malcolm Murray (from 30 May) (until 9 July)
Non-executive director	(Scotland) James Easdale (from 9 July)
Non-executive director	(Scotland) Norman Crighton (from 14 November)

Source: Wikipedia article

=== Coaching staff ===
Position	Staff
Manager	(Scotland) Ally McCoist
Assistant manager	(Scotland) Kenny McDowall
First-team coach	(Scotland) Ian Durrant
Head of Sports; Science	(Wales) Adam Owen (until 21 June) (Scotland) Jim Henry (from 24 June)
Goalkeepers coach	(Scotland) Jim Stewart

Source: Wikipedia article

=== Other staff ===
Position	Staff
Head of Football; Administration	(Scotland) Andrew Dickson
Director of Communications	(Scotland) Jim Traynor (until 1 November)
Physiotherapist	(England) Steve Walker
Doctor	(Scotland) Dr Paul Jackson
Masseur	(Scotland) Davie Lavery
Kit controller	(Scotland) Jimmy Bell
Video analyst	(Scotland) Steve Harvey
Consultant (Finance)	(England) Philip Nash (from 11 January)
Consultant (Operations)	(England) Charles Green (from 2 August) (until 20 August)
Consultant (Communications)	(England) Paul Tyrrell (from 24 April)

Source: Wikipedia article

== Matches ==
=== Pre-season and friendlies ===
7 July 2013 Friendly	Brora Rangers	0 − 2	Rangers	Brora
		Report	Macleod 54', 59'	Stadium: Dudgeon Park; Attendance: 2,163

10 July 2013 Friendly	Brora Rangers	0 − 1	Rangers	Elgin
		Report	Aird 63'	Stadium: Borough Briggs; Attendance: 2,382

13 July 2013 Friendly	Bristol City	0 − 1	Rangers	Bristol
		Report	Macleod 62'	Stadium: Ashton Gate; Attendance: 7,874

17 July 2013 Friendly	FC Gütersloh	0 − 1	Rangers	Gütersloh
		Report	McCulloch 18'	Stadium: Heidewaldstadion; Attendance: 2,017

20 July 2013 Friendly	FC Emmen	0 − 1	Rangers	Emmen
		Report	Daly 49'	Stadium: De Meerdijk; Attendance: 2,007

24 July 2013 Friendly	Sheffield Wednesday	1 − 0	Rangers	Sheffield
	Antonio 12'	Report		Stadium: Hillsborough Stadium; Attendance: 16,248

31 July 2013 Dundee 120th Anniversary Challenge Match	Dundee	1 − 1	Rangers	Dundee
19:45 BST	Gallagher 42'	Report	Peralta 60'	Stadium: Dens Park; Attendance: 5,244

6 August 2013 Friendly	Rangers	1 − 1	Newcastle United	Glasgow
19:45 BST	McCulloch 5' (pen.)	Report	Ameobi 90'	Stadium: Ibrox Stadium; Attendance: 24,385; Referee: Steven McLean

=== Scottish League One ===
10 August 2013 1	Rangers	4 – 1	Brechin City	Glasgow
12:45 BST	Hegarty 2'; Law 40'; Black 81'; Shiels 85'	BBC; Rangers; Sky Sports	Jackson 65'; McLean (red card) 81'	Stadium: Ibrox Stadium; Attendance: 44,380; Referee: George Salmond

17 August 2013 2	Stranraer	0 – 3	Rangers	Stranraer
15:00 BST		BBC; Rangers; Sky Sports	Little 7'; Macleod 23'; McCulloch 30'	Stadium: Stair Park; Attendance: 3,473; Referee: Craig Charleston

23 August 2013 3	Airdrieonians	0 – 6	Rangers	Airdrie
19:45 BST		BBC; Rangers; Sky Sports	Macleod 19'; Little 37'; Crawford 49'; Daly 66', 71'; Law 69'	Stadium: Excelsior Stadium; Attendance: 9,044; Referee: Stephen Finnie

31 August 2013 4	Rangers	5 – 0	East Fife	Glasgow
15:00 BST	Clark 1'; McCulloch 17', 36', 63'; Macleod 54'	BBC; Rangers; Sky Sports		Stadium: Ibrox Stadium; Attendance: 42,870; Referee: Alan Muir

14 September 2013 5	Rangers	5 – 1	Arbroath	Glasgow
15:00 BST	Mohsni 57'; McCulloch 65', 75', 90+1'; Little 88'	BBC; Rangers; Sky Sports	Cook 48'	Stadium: Ibrox Stadium; Attendance: 43,562; Referee: Crawford Allan

22 September 2013 6	Forfar Athletic	0 – 1	Rangers	Forfar
12:45 BST		BBC; Rangers; Sky Sports	Little 43'	Stadium: Station Park; Attendance: 3,766; Referee: John McKendrick

28 September 2013 7	Rangers	8 – 0	Stenhousemuir	Glasgow
15:00 BST	Daly 3', 17', 50', 83'; Little 38'; Wallace 60'; Templeton 87'; Mohsni 90+3'	BBC; Rangers; Sky Sports		Stadium: Ibrox Stadium; Attendance: 43,877; Referee: Brian Colvin

6 October 2013 8	Ayr United	0 – 2	Rangers	Ayr
12:45 BST		BBC; Rangers; Sky Sports	Mohsni 56'; Macleod 59'	Stadium: Somerset Park; Attendance: 8,968; Referee: Bobby Madden

19 October 2013 9	Brechin City	3 – 4	Rangers	Brechin
15:00 BST	Hay 5'; Brown 10'; Trouten 35'; Trouten (yellow card) 90' (red card)	BBC; Rangers; Sky Sports	Daly 25'; Mohsni 53'; Law 66'; Clark 85'	Stadium: Glebe Park; Attendance: 3,237; Referee: Craig Charleston

26 October 2013 10	East Fife	0 – 4	Rangers	Methil
15:00 BST		BBC; Rangers; Sky Sports	Thom 49' (o.g.); Daly 52', 57', 66'	Stadium: Bayview Stadium; Attendance: 4,700; Referee: Stephen Finnie

6 November 2013 11	Rangers	3 – 1	Dunfermline Athletic	Glasgow
19:45 GMT	McCulloch 71' (pen.); Daly 78'; Mohsni 90+3'	BBC; Rangers; Sky Sports	Falkingham 81'; Moore (yellow card) 71' (red card)	Stadium: Ibrox Stadium; Attendance: 43,082; Referee: Stevie O'Reilly

9 November 2013 12	Rangers	2 – 0	Airdrieonians	Glasgow
15:00 GMT	Daly 45'; McCulloch 64' (pen.)	BBC; Rangers; Sky Sports		Stadium: Ibrox Stadium; Attendance: 43,158; Referee: Don Robertson

25 November 2013 13	Arbroath	0 – 3	Rangers	Arbroath
19:45 GMT		BBC; Rangers; Sky Sports	Daly 3'; Donaldson 27' (o.g.); Clark 41'	Stadium: Gayfield Park; Attendance: 3,912; Referee: Iain Brines

3 December 2013 14	Rangers	6 – 1	Forfar Athletic	Glasgow
19:45 GMT	Clark 6', 27', 44', 66'; Wallace 37'; McCulloch 71' (pen.)	BBC; Rangers; Sky Sports	Swankie 25'	Stadium: Ibrox Stadium; Attendance: 38,745; Referee: Crawford Allan

7 December 2013 15	Rangers	3 − 0	Ayr United	Glasgow
15:00 GMT	Daly 12'; Aird 23'; Mohsni 86'	BBC; Rangers; Sky Sports		Stadium: Ibrox Stadium; Attendance: 45,227; Referee: Euan Anderson

26 December 2013 16	Rangers	1 − 1	Stranraer	Glasgow
15:00 GMT	McCulloch 37' (pen.)	BBC; Rangers; Sky Sports	Longworth 90+4'	Stadium: Ibrox Stadium; Attendance: 45,462; Referee: Andrew Dallas

30 December 2013 17	Dunfermline Athletic	0 − 4	Rangers	Dunfermline
19:45 GMT		BBC; Rangers; Sky Sports	Aird 22'; Clark 52'; Law 70'; Crawford 90+2'	Stadium: East End Park; Attendance: 10,089; Referee: Craig Charleston

2 January 2014 18	Airdrieonians	0 − 1	Rangers	Airdrie
17:30 GMT		BBC; Rangers; Sky Sports	Macleod 18'	Stadium: Excelsior Stadium; Attendance: 6,522; Referee: Greg Aitken

5 January 2014 19	Stenhousemuir	0 − 2	Rangers	Stenhousemuir
17:30 GMT		BBC; Rangers; Sky Sports	Law 36', 90+1'; Peralta (red card) 41'	Stadium: Ochilview Park; Attendance: 2,546; Referee: Bobby Madden

11 January 2014 20	Rangers	2 – 0	East Fife	Glasgow
15:00 GMT	Shiels 5', 64'	BBC; Rangers; Sky Sports		Stadium: Ibrox Stadium; Attendance: 42,182; Referee: Don Robertson

20 January 2014 21	Forfar Athletic	0 – 2	Rangers	Forfar
19:45 GMT		BBC; Rangers; Sky Sports	Mohsni 75'; Templeton 90'	Stadium: Station Park; Attendance: 2,067; Referee: Stephen Finnie

25 January 2014 22	Rangers	3 – 2	Arbroath	Glasgow
15:00 GMT	Daly 21'; Templeton 72'; McCulloch 78' (pen.)	BBC; Rangers; Sky Sports	Banjo 2'; Linn 50'	Stadium: Ibrox Stadium; Attendance: 41,207; Referee: Barry Cook

1 February 2014 23	Rangers	2 – 1	Brechin City	Glasgow
15:00 GMT	Shiels 14'; Daly 25'; Mohsni (yellow card) 61' (red card)	BBC; Rangers; Sky Sports	Robb 52'	Stadium: Ibrox Stadium; Attendance: 40,377; Referee: Stevie O'Reilly

15 February 2014 24	Ayr United	0 – 2	Rangers	Ayr
15:00 GMT		BBC; Rangers; Sky Sports	Law 46'; Daly 59'	Stadium: Somerset Park; Attendance: 8,449; Referee: John McKendrick

22 February 2014 25	Rangers	3 – 3	Stenhousemuir	Glasgow
15:00 GMT	Law 36'; McMillan 69' (o.g.); Daly 72'	BBC; Rangers; Sky Sports	Dickson 16'; Higgins 58', 75' (pen.)	Stadium: Ibrox Stadium; Attendance: 41,794; Referee: Greg Aitken

25 February 2014 26	Stranraer	0 – 2	Rangers	Stranraer
19:45 GMT		BBC; Rangers; Sky Sports	Wallace 5'; Daly 89'	Stadium: Stair Park; Attendance: 3,024; Referee: Euan Anderson

1 March 2014 27	East Fife	0 – 1	Rangers	Methil
12:45 GMT		BBC; Rangers; Sky Sports	McCulloch 90+3' (pen.)	Stadium: Bayview Stadium; Attendance: 4,020; Referee: Alan Muir

12 March 2014 28	Rangers	3 – 0	Airdrieonians	Glasgow
19:45 GMT	McCulloch 3' (pen.), 21' (pen.), 41'	BBC; Rangers; Sky Sports		Stadium: Ibrox Stadium; Attendance: 41,343; Referee: Brian Colvin

15 March 2014 29	Rangers	2 – 0	Dunfermline Athletic	Glasgow
15:00 GMT	Smith 45+4'; Gallagher 90'	BBC; Rangers; Sky Sports		Stadium: Ibrox Stadium; Attendance: 44,110; Referee: Kevin Clancy

23 March 2014 30	Brechin City	1 – 2	Rangers	Brechin
12:45 GMT	Thomson 49'	BBC; Rangers; Sky Sports	Aird 23'; Clark 67'	Stadium: Glebe Park; Attendance: 3,070; Referee: Andrew Dallas

29 March 2014 31	Arbroath	1 – 2	Rangers	Arbroath
15:00 GMT	McManus 61'	BBC; Rangers; Sky Sports	Daly 19'; Aird 87'	Stadium: Gayfield Park; Attendance: 3,400; Referee: Euan Anderson

15 April 2014 32	Rangers	3 – 0	Forfar Athletic	Glasgow
19:45 GMT	Black 67'; Mohsni 75'; Shiels 85'	BBC; Rangers; Sky Sports		Stadium: Ibrox Stadium; Attendance: 39,704; Referee: Craig Charleston

19 April 2014 33	Stenhousemuir	0 − 4	Rangers	Stenhousemuir
15:00 BST		BBC; Rangers; Sky Sports	Smith 32'; Shiels 36'; McCulloch 65' (pen.); Law 78'	Stadium: Ochilview Park; Attendance: 2,767; Referee: John McKendrick

22 April 2014 34	Rangers	2 − 1	Ayr United	Glasgow
19:45 BST	Mohsni 54', 82'	BBC; Rangers; Sky Sports	Forrest 69'	Stadium: Ibrox Stadium; Attendance: 40,651; Referee: Iain Brines

26 April 2014 35	Rangers	3 − 0	Stranraer	Glasgow
12:45 BST	Aird 37'; Peralta 60'; Shiels 66'	BBC; Rangers; Sky Sports		Stadium: Ibrox Stadium; Attendance: 46,093; Referee: Stephen Finnie

3 May 2014 36	Dunfermline Athletic	1 − 1	Rangers	Dunfermline
15:00 BST	Martin 71'	BBC; Rangers; Sky Sports	Shiels 46'	Stadium: East End Park; Attendance: 7,605; Referee: Don Robertson

=== Challenge Cup ===
28 July 2013 First round	Albion Rovers	0 − 4	Rangers	Livingston
16:05 BST		BBC; Rangers; Sky Sports	Law 26', 44'; Black 71'; Templeton 74'	Stadium: Almondvale Stadium; Attendance: 5,345; Referee: John Beaton

27 August 2013 Second round	Rangers	2 − 0	Berwick Rangers	Glasgow
19:45 BST	McKay 60'; Little 62'	BBC; Rangers; Sky Sports		Stadium: Ibrox Stadium; Attendance: 16,097; Referee: Euan Norris

17 September 2013 Quarter-finals	Queen of the South	0 − 3	Rangers	Dumfries
19:45 BST	Higgins (yellow card) 75' (red card)	BBC; Rangers; Sky Sports	Mohsni 7'; Daly 75'; McCulloch 83'	Stadium: Palmerston Park; Attendance: 6,155; Referee: Calum Murray

29 October 2013 Semi-finals	Stenhousemuir	0 − 1	Rangers	Stenhousemuir
19:35 GMT		BBC; Rangers; Sky Sports	Daly 74'	Stadium: Ochilview Park; Attendance: 2,338; Referee: Bobby Madden

6 April 2014 Final	Raith Rovers	1 − 0 (a.e.t.)	Rangers	Edinburgh
16:05 GMT	Baird 117'	BBC; Rangers; Sky Sports		Stadium: Easter Road; Attendance: 19,983; Referee: Kevin Clancy

=== League Cup ===
3 August 2013 First round	Forfar Athletic	2 − 1 (a.e.t.)	Rangers	Forfar
15:00 BST	Swankie 8', 115'	BBC; Rangers; Sky Sports	Aird 84'	Stadium: Station Park; Attendance: 4,079; Referee: Calum Murray

=== Scottish Cup ===
1 November 2013 Third round	Rangers	3 − 0	Airdrieonians	Glasgow
19:45 GMT	Daly 49', 53'; Templeton 80'	BBC; Rangers; Sky Sports		Stadium: Ibrox Stadium; Attendance: 22,533; Referee: John Beaton

30 November 2013 Fourth round	Falkirk	0 − 2	Rangers	Falkirk
12:15 GMT	McCracken (red card) 57'	BBC; Rangers; Sky Sports	Law 89'; Templeton 90+3'	Stadium: Falkirk Stadium; Attendance: 6,228; Referee: Brian Colvin

7 February 2014 Fifth round	Rangers	4 − 0	Dunfermline Athletic	Glasgow
19:30 GMT	Shiels 8', 24', 47'; Templeton 37'	BBC; Rangers; Sky Sports		Stadium: Ibrox Stadium; Attendance: 19,396; Referee: Bobby Madden

9 March 2014 Quarter-finals	Rangers	1 – 1	Albion Rovers	Glasgow
15:30 GMT	Mohsni 78'	BBC; Rangers; Sky Sports	Donnelly 14'	Stadium: Ibrox Stadium; Attendance: 23,976; Referee: John Beaton

17 March 2014 Quarter-finals; Replay	Albion Rovers	0 − 2	Rangers	Hamilton
19:45 GMT		BBC; Rangers; Sky Sports	Aird 18'; Daly 57'	Stadium: New Douglas Park; Attendance: 5,354; Referee: John Beaton

12 April 2014 Semi-finals	Rangers	1 − 3	Dundee United	Glasgow
12:45 GMT	Smith 42'	BBC; Rangers; Sky Sports	Armstrong 23'; Mackay-Steven 36'; Çiftçi 83'	Stadium: Ibrox Stadium; Attendance: 41,059; Referee: Bobby Madden

== Competitions ==
As a Scottish League One club, Rangers entered the Scottish Cup in the Third Round and entered both the Scottish Challenge Cup and Scottish League Cup in the First Round. They also competed in 36 league matches in the new Scottish League One.

=== Scottish League One ===
==== Standings ====
Pos	Team	Pld	W	D	L	GF	GA	GD	Pts	Qualification or relegation
1	Rangers (C, P)	36	33	3	0	106	18	+88	102	Promotion to the Championship
2	Dunfermline Athletic	36	19	6	11	68	54	+14	63	Qualification for the Championship play-offs
3	Stranraer	36	14	9	13	57	57	0	51	Qualification for the Championship play-offs
4	Ayr United	36	14	7	15	65	66	−1	49	Qualification for the Championship play-offs
5	Stenhousemuir	36	12	12	12	57	66	−9	48	

Source: SPFL
Rules for classification: 1) points; 2) goal difference; 3) number of goals scored.
(C) Champions; (P) Promoted

==== Results by round ====
Round	1	2	3	4	5	6	7	8	9	10	11	12	13	14	15	16	17	18	19	20	21	22	23	24	25	26	27	28	29	30	31	32	33	34	35	36
Ground	H	A	A	H	H	A	H	A	H	A	A	H	H	A	H	A	H	A	A	H	A	H	H	A	A	H	A	H	H	A	A	H	A	H	H	A
Result	W	W	W	W	W	W	W	W	W	W	W	W	W	W	W	W	D	W	W	W	W	W	W	W	W	D	W	W	W	W	W	W	W	W	W	D
Position	1	1	1	1	1	1	1	1	1	1	1	1	1	1	1	1	1	1	1	1	1	1	1	1	1	1	1	1	1	1	1	1	1	1	1	1

Updated to match(es) played on 3 May 2014. Source: 2013–14 Scottish Second Division
A = Away; H = Home; W = Win; D = Draw; L = Loss
