= Fraser Aird =

Canadian soccer player (born 1995)

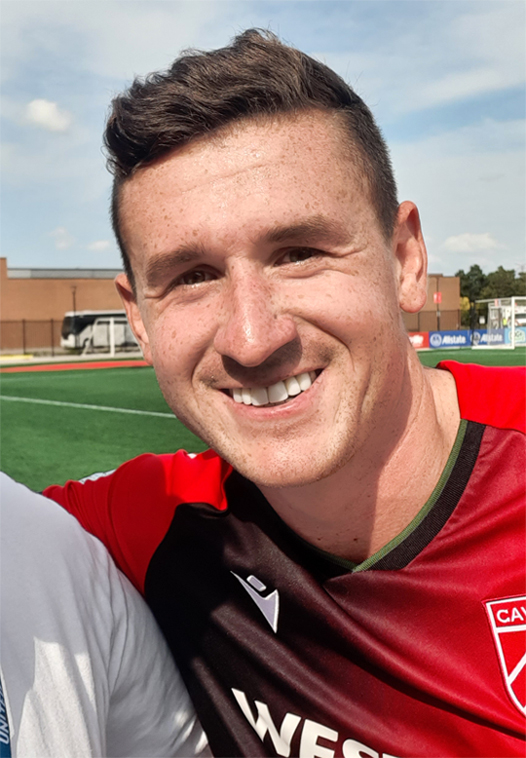
- Aird in 2023

Personal information
- Date of birth: 2 February 1995 (age 31)
- Place of birth: Toronto, Ontario, Canada
- Position: Midfielder

Youth career
- North Scarborough SC
- 2011–2012: Rangers

Senior career*
Years	Team	Apps	(Gls)
2012–2017	Rangers	62	(9)
2016	→ Vancouver Whitecaps FC (loan)	18	(0)
2017	Falkirk	12	(1)
2017–2018	Dunfermline Athletic	21	(4)
2018–2019	Dundee United	19	(3)
2018–2019	→ Queen of the South (loan)	6	(0)
2019	Cove Rangers	9	(3)
2020	Valour FC	6	(1)
2021	FC Edmonton	28	(5)
2022–2025	Cavalry FC	85	(7)
2026–	Calgary Foothills FC	14	(12)

International career^{‡}
2010	Canada U15	1	(0)
2011–2012	Scotland U17	8	(2)
2013	Scotland U19	2	(2)
2015–2017	Canada	8	(1)
- * Club domestic league appearances and goals as of September 9, 2026 ‡ National team caps and goals as of 8 October 2017

Fraser Aird (born 2 February 1995) is a Canadian professional soccer player who plays as a midfielder for Calgary Foothills FC in the Alberta Premier League. Aird has also played for the Canada national team.

== Early life ==
Aird is a boyhood fan of his former club Rangers due to his Scottish, Rangers-supporting parents emigrating to Canada in 1987.

Aird signed as a youth for Rangers at the age of sixteen. Within a year at the club he worked his way from the under-17 squad to the under-19 squad.

== Club career ==
=== Scotland ===
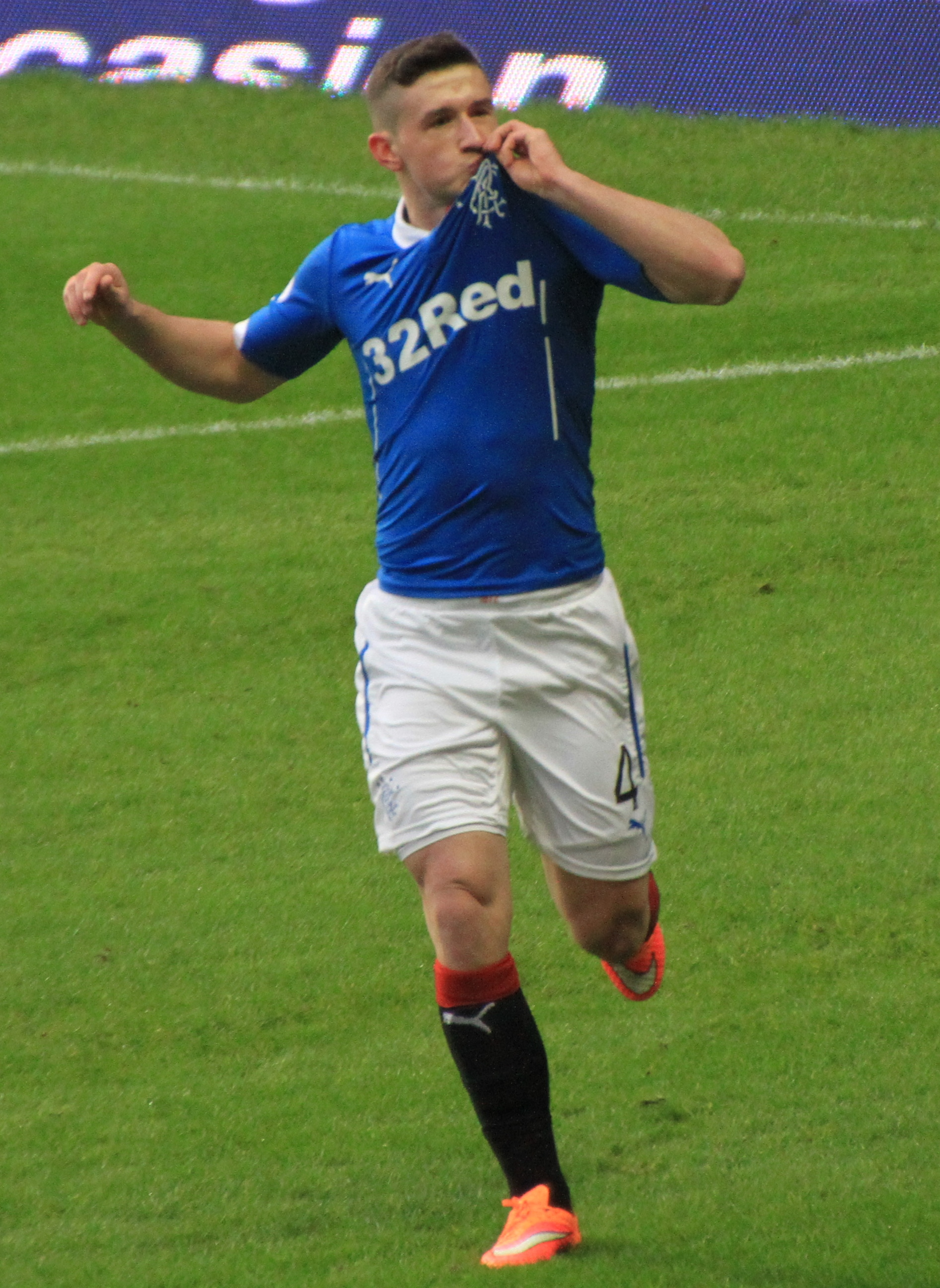
Aird celebrating a goal for Rangers in 2014

Aird made his first team debut for Rangers during a 4–1 victory over Montrose in the Scottish Third Division on 23 September 2012. Aird was incorrectly listed as the goalkeeper by many media sources during a match against Elgin City in December 2012 when it was actually Neil Alexander. He scored his first goal for the club versus Queens Park at Hampden Park on 29 December 2012. In his first competitive match of the 2013–14 season he scored the first goal for Rangers as a half-time substitute against Forfar Athletic in the League Cup, Rangers went on to lose 2–1. On 3 May 2014, after a 1–1 draw with Dunfermline Athletic, Aird was among the Rangers players who made history by becoming the first Rangers side in 115 years to go an entire league season unbeaten, during which they clinched the Scottish League One Championship.

Aird joined Major League Soccer club Vancouver Whitecaps FC on a season-long loan on 29 January 2016. He made his debut against Montreal Impact on 7 March 2016.

On 18 January 2017, Aird signed for Falkirk of the Scottish Championship until the end of the end of the season after mutually "agreeing to terminate his contract with Rangers." He made his debut for Falkirk in a 2–0 defeat to Greenock Morton in the Scottish Cup. His first goal came against Ayr United in a 4–1 win on 11 March 2017. At the end of his contract in May 2017, Aird was released by the club.

Aird signed a one-year deal with Dunfermline Athletic on 3 August 2017, with the option of a further year.

On 1 June 2018, Aird signed a two-year contract with Dundee United. On 2 September 2019 he left Dundee United by mutual consent.

On 31 January 2019, Aird was sent out on loan to Dumfries club Queen of the South until 31 May 2019.

On 26 September 2019, Aird signed for Aberdeen club Cove Rangers until January 2020. He left the club shortly before the expiry of his contract after he was pictured gesturing towards opposition fans while supporting Rangers in an Old Firm match.

=== Canada ===
Aird joined Valour FC of the Canadian Premier League on 24 January 2020. He made his debut for Valour on 16 August in a 2–0 loss to Cavalry FC. Aird scored his first goal for Valour in the following game against Atlético Ottawa, netting a penalty on 19 August.

On 24 December 2020, Aird signed with FC Edmonton.

On 9 February 2022, Aird signed a two-year contract with an option for 2024 with Cavalry FC. He began the season as a mainstay in Cavalry's midfield, playing every single minute until he suffered a long term ACL injury in his fifth match of the season, against FC Edmonton. Aird would re-sign with the club on a two-year contract in December 2023. He scored Cavalry's lone goal from the penalty spot in the 2025 CPL final on 9 November 2025 as Cavalry lost 2–1 to Atlético Ottawa.

== International career ==
Aird was part of a Canadian under-15 camp in 2010 and played in a friendly against the US the same year. After moving to Scotland, the country of his parents birth, Aird made his debut for Scotland at under-17 level in a friendly international tournament in August 2011. In 2012, he made his debut in a UEFA competition for Scotland featuring in the UEFA Under 17 Championship qualifying campaign against Macedonia. In his final under-17 game, he scored against Denmark.

Aird was named in the preliminary Canada national team squad for the 2013 Gold Cup in the US, however he turned down a call up to the final squad and later in the same year represented Scotland under-19's. Aird played twice for Scotland under-19 in friendlies scoring in 4–2 victory over Switzerland.

In April 2014 it was reported that Aird was set to pledge his international allegiance to Canada and join the senior squad for friendlies against Bulgaria and Moldova in Austria the following month, a claim the player later refuted on his personal Twitter account by saying he was still undecided on his future. In May 2014 Aird joined a training camp in Florida with the Canadian Under-20 team in preparation for the 2015 CONCACAF U-20 Championship, the tournament which will serve as CONCACAF qualification for 2015 FIFA U-20 World Cup.

On 28 September 2015 it was reported on the official Rangers website that Aird had been called up by Canada for an October friendly against Ghana. Aird got his first senior international cap in the match coming on as a second-half substitute for Karl Ouimette in the eventual 1–1 draw on 13 October 2015. Aird scored his first goal for Canada against his ancestral Scotland in a 1–1 draw on 22 March 2017.

== Career statistics ==
=== Club ===
As of 9 September 2026

Appearances and goals by club, season and competition
Club	Season	League			National Cup		League Cup		Other		Total	
Club	Season	Division	Apps	Goals	Apps	Goals	Apps	Goals	Apps	Goals	Apps	Goals
Rangers	2012–13	Scottish Third Division	19	3	2	0	1	0	0	0	22	3
Rangers	2013–14	Scottish League One	27	5	6	1	1	1	3 (Note: Appearances in the Scottish Challenge Cup)	0	37	7
Rangers	2014–15	Scottish Championship	13	1	1	0	4	0	4	1	22	2
Rangers	2015–16	Scottish Championship	3	0	0	0	0	0	1	0	4	0
Rangers	2016–17	Scottish Premiership	0	0	0	0	0	0	—		0	0
Rangers	Total		62	9	9	1	6	1	8	1	85	12
Vancouver Whitecaps FC (loan)	2016	Major League Soccer	18	0	2 (Note: Appearances in the Canadian Championship)	0	—		4 (Note: Appearances in the CONCACAF Champions League)	0	24	0
Falkirk	2016–17	Scottish Championship	12	1	1	0	0	0	0	0	13	1
Dunfermline Athletic	2017–18	Scottish Championship	21	4	0	0	0	0	4 (Note: Appearances in the Scottish Premiership play-offs)	0	25	4
Dundee United	2018-19	Scottish Championship	19	3	0	0	3	0	0	0	22	3
Queen of the South (loan)	2018-19	Scottish Championship	6	0	1	0	0	0	2	0	9	0
Cove Rangers	2019-20	Scottish League Two	9	3	1	0	0	0	0	0	10	3
Valour FC	2020	Canadian Premier League	6	1	—		—		—		6	1
FC Edmonton	2021	Canadian Premier League	28	5	1	0	—		—		29	5
Cavalry FC	2022	Canadian Premier League	5	0	0	0	—		0	0	5	0
Cavalry FC	2023	Canadian Premier League	26	2	1	0	0	0	3	0	30	2
Cavalry FC	2024	Canadian Premier League	26	3	3	0	—		4	0	33	3
Cavalry FC	2025	Canadian Premier League	28	2	3	0	0	0	5	1	36	3
Cavalry FC	Total		85	7	7	0	0	0	12	1	104	8
Calgary Foothills FC	2026	Alberta Premier League	14	12	—		—		—		14	12
Career total			281	45	22	1	9	1	30	2	341	49

=== International ===
As of 8 October 2017

Appearances and goals by national team and year
National team	Year	Apps	Goals
Canada	2015	1	0
Canada	2016	3	0
Canada	2017	4	1
Total		8	1

Scores and results list Canada's goal tally first, score column indicates score after each Aird goal.

List of international goals scored by Fraser Aird
No.	Date	Venue	Opponent	Score	Result	Competition
1	22 March 2017	Easter Road, Edinburgh, Scotland	Scotland	1–0	1–1	Friendly

== Honours ==
Rangers

- Scottish Third Division: 2012–13
- Scottish League One: 2013–14

Cavalry

- CPL Shield: 2023

Individual

- Rangers Young Player of the Year: 2013–14

== See also ==
- List of sportspeople who competed for more than one nation
