= Nick Feely =

Australian professional footballer

Personal information
- Full name: Nicholas Feely
- Date of birth: 9 May 1992 (age 34)
- Place of birth: Hong Kong
- Height: 1.92 m (6 ft 4 in)
- Position: Goalkeeper

Team information
- Current team: Brunswick Juventus
- Number: 1

Youth career
- Subiaco
- –2009: Cockburn City
- 2009–2010: Perth Glory
- 2010–2012: Celtic

Senior career*
Years	Team	Apps	(Gls)
2012	Clyde	12	(0)
2016–2018	Perth Glory NPL	12	(0)
2016–2019	Perth Glory	4	(0)
2019	Pascoe Vale	25	(0)
2020–2026	Oakleigh Cannons	111	(0)
2026–	Brunswick Juventus	19	(0)
- * Club domestic league appearances and goals as of 30 August 2026

Nicholas 'Nick' Feely (born 9 May 1992) is an Australian professional footballer who plays as a goalkeeper for Brunswick Juventus FC and former A-League players for Perth Glory.

== Personal life ==
Nick is the son of English former professional footballer Peter Feely.

Feely played for Celtic at the 2011 HKFC International Soccer Sevens in Hong Kong. He was also selected for the Australian side at the 2011 FIFA U-20 World Cup.
