= Kyle McAusland =

Scottish footballer

Personal information
- Date of birth: 19 January 1993 (age 33)
- Place of birth: Irvine, Scotland
- Position: Defender

Youth career
- 2006–2012: Rangers

Senior career*
Years	Team	Apps	(Gls)
2012–2015	Rangers	4	(0)
2012–2013	→ Ayr United (loan)	23	(3)
2013–2014	→ Ayr United (loan)	17	(0)
2014	→ Brechin City (loan)	8	(2)
2015	Dunfermline Athletic	14	(1)
2015–2016	Alloa Athletic	32	(1)
2016–2020	Glenafton Athletic		
2020–2023	Cumnock Juniors		
- * Club domestic league appearances and goals as of 15:00, 1 October 2020 (UTC)

Kyle McAusland (born 19 January 1993) is a Scottish footballer who plays as a defender.

McAusland has previously played for Rangers, Dunfermline Athletic, whilst also having spent time on loan with Ayr United, Brechin City and Glenafton Athletic.

== Career ==
McAusland, from Cumnock, East Ayrshire, joined Rangers aged thirteen in 2006. At that time he played as a striker and during his spell in the youth teams played in a variety of positions before settling as a right back.

McAusland was loaned to Ayr United for the first part of the 2012–13 season and signed a new contract with Rangers in February 2013, through to the summer of 2015. A few months later he made his competitive Rangers debut in a Challenge Cup at right back on 27 July against Albion Rovers. McAusland went on to make a further six appearances for Rangers (five of which were starts) before losing his place in the side after the signing of the experienced Richard Foster. In October 2013, McAusland re-joined Ayr United for the rest of the 2013–14 season after requesting more first-team football.

After failing to feature in manager Ally McCoists plans at the start of the season, McAusland was loaned out to Brechin City in September 2014. In January 2015, after return from his loan spell, McAusland had his contract terminated with Rangers in order for him to join Dunfermline Athletic.

On 22 June 2015 Alloa Athletic announced the signing of McAusland.

McAusland joined Junior side Glenafton Athletic in July 2016.

McAusland signed with Cumnock Juniors in June 2020.

== Career statistics ==
As of 24 August 2016

Club	Season	League		Cup		League Cup		Other		Total	
Club	Season	Apps	Goals	Apps	Goals	Apps	Goals	Apps	Goals	Apps	Goals
Rangers
Rangers	2012–13	0	0	0	0	0	0	0	0	0	0
Rangers	2013–14	4	0	0	0	1	0	1	0	6	0
Rangers	2014–15	0	0	0	0	0	0	0	0	0	0
Rangers	Total	4	0	0	0	1	0	1	0	6	0
Ayr United (loan)
Ayr United (loan)	2012–13	23	3	1	0	0	0	0	0	24	3
Ayr United (loan)
Ayr United (loan)	2013–14	17	0	0	0	0	0	2	0	19	0
Brechin City (loan)
Brechin City (loan)	2014–15	8	2	3	1	0	0	0	0	11	3
Dunfermline Athletic
Dunfermline Athletic	2014–15	14	1	0	0	0	0	0	0	14	1
Alloa Athletic
Alloa Athletic	2015–16	32	1	1	0	0	0	1	0	34	1
Career Total		98	7	5	1	1	0	4	0	108	8
