= Yuen Tsun Tung =

Hong Kong footballer

Yuen Tsun Tung 袁浚東
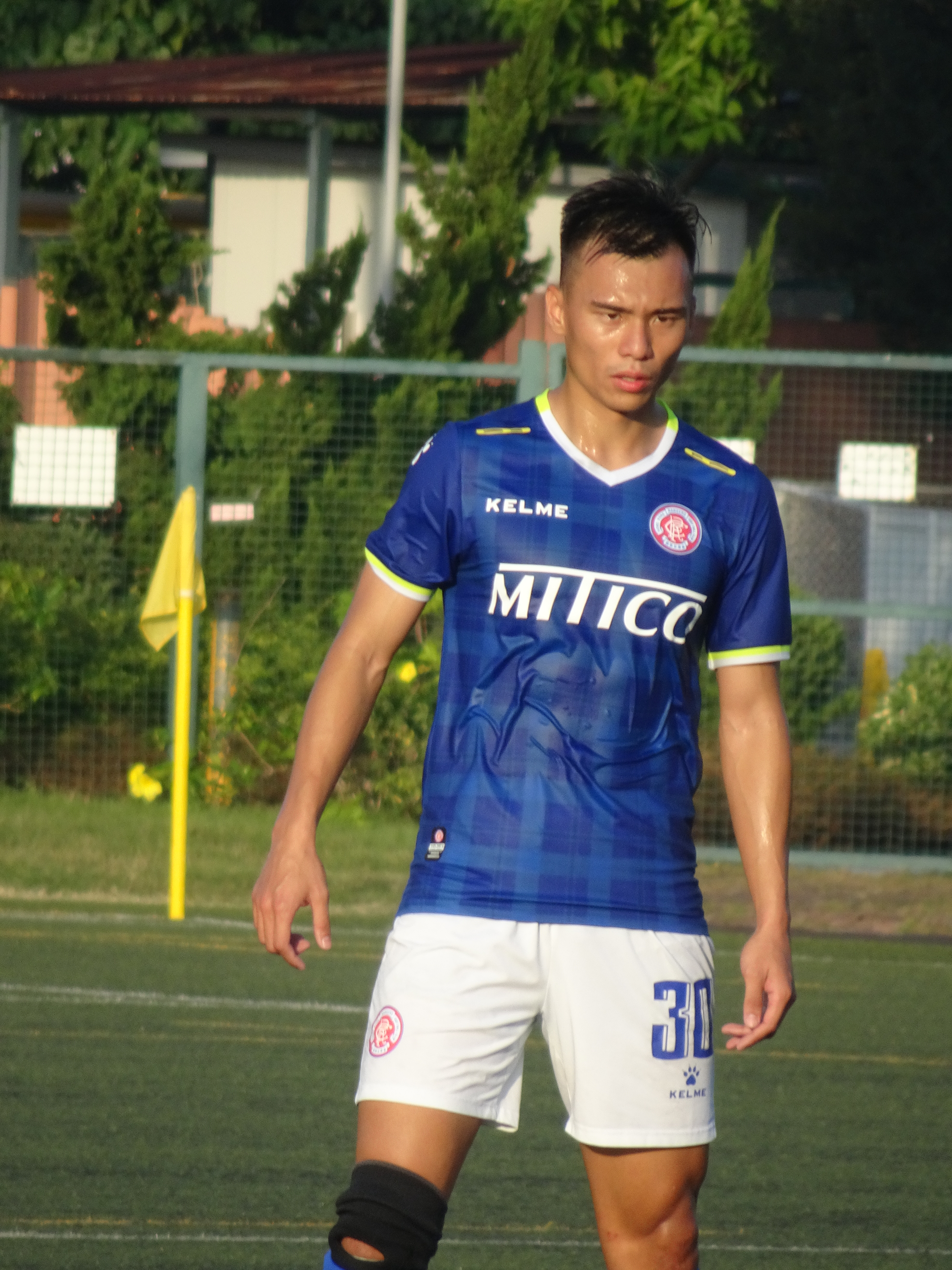

Personal information
- Full name: Yuen Tsun Tung
- Date of birth: May 24, 1991 (age 35)
- Place of birth: Hong Kong
- Height: 1.80 m (5 ft 11 in)
- Position: Defender

Team information
- Current team: Wong Tai Sin

Youth career
- 2007–2008: Rangers (HKG)
- 2008–2009: Fourway

Senior career*
Years	Team	Apps	(Gls)
2008–2009	Fourway	0	(0)
2009–2010	Fourway Rangers	0	(0)
2010–2012	Yuen Long	15	(0)
2012	→ Hong Kong Sapling (loan)	0	(0)
2012–2018	Wing Yee	68	(5)
2018	Rangers (HKG)	3	(0)
2020	Wong Tai Sin	1	(0)
2020–	Yuen Long	78	(5)

International career^{‡}
2008	Hong Kong U–17		
2009	Hong Kong U–20		
2011	Hong Kong U–21	1	(0)
- * Club domestic league appearances and goals ‡ National team caps and goals as of 16 May 2026

Yuen Tsun Tung (Chinese: 袁浚東; Jyutping: jyun^{4} zeon^{3} dung^{1}) is a former Hong Kong professional football player. His twin brother Yuen Tsun Nam is also a former footballer.

== Career statistics ==
=== Club ===
As of 25 December 2016.

Club	Season	Division	League		Senior Shield		FA Cup		League Cup		AFC Cup		Total	
Club	Season	Division	Apps	Goals	Apps	Goals	Apps	Goals	Apps	Goals	Apps	Goals	Apps	Goals
Fourway	2008–09	First Division	0	0	0	0	0	0	0	0	—	—	0	0
Fourway Total			0	0	0	0	0	0	0	0	—	—	0	0
Fourway Rangers	2009–10	First Division	0	0	0	0	0	0	—	—	—	—	0	0
Fourway Rangers	2010–11	First Division	0	0	0	0	0	0	0	0	—	—	0	0
Fourway Rangers Total			0	0	0	0	0	0	0	0	—	—	0	0
Yuen Long	2010–11	Second Division	8	0	1	0	—	—	—	—	—	—	9	0
Yuen Long	2011–12	Second Division	7	0	0	0	—	—	—	—	—	—	7	0
Hong Kong Sapling (loan)	2011–12	First Division	0	0	0	0	0	0	0	0	—	—	0	0
Yuen Long Total			15	0	1	0	—	—	—	—	—	—	16	0
Hong Kong Sapling Total			0	0	0	0	0	0	0	0	—	—	0	0
Wing Yee	2012–13	Second Division	12	0	—	—	1	0	—	—	—	—	13	0
Wing Yee	2013–14	Second Division	14	0	—	—	2	0	—	—	—	—	16	0
Wing Yee	2014–15	Second Division	15	2	—	—	2	0	—	—	—	—	17	2
Wing Yee	2015–16	First Division	14	2	—	—	3	0	—	—	—	—	17	2
Wing Yee	2016–17	First Division	13	1	—	—	2	0	—	—	—	—	15	1
Wing Yee Total			68	5	—	—	10	0	—	—	—	—	78	5
Hong Kong Total			83	5	1	0	10	0	0	0	0	0	94	5
