= Allan Fraser (footballer) =

Scottish footballer

Personal information
- Date of birth: 25 June 1981 (age 45)
- Place of birth: Aberdeen, Scotland
- Position: Defender

Youth career
- –2000: Celtic

Senior career*
Years	Team	Apps	(Gls)
2000–2002	Keith		
2002–2003	Newcastle Town		
2003–2005	Alsager Town		
2005–2006	Keith		
2008–2016	HKFC		
- * Club domestic league appearances and goals

Allan Fraser (Chinese: 費沙; born 19 October 1982) is a Scottish former professional footballer.

== Career statistics ==
=== Club ===
Appearances and goals by club, season and competition
Club	Season	League			Cup		League Cup		Other		Total	
Club	Season	Division	Apps	Goals	Apps	Goals	Apps	Goals	Apps	Goals	Apps	Goals
HKFC	2010–11	First Division	15	2	1 (Note: Appearances in the Hong Kong FA Cup)	0	0	0	0	0	16	2
