= Andrew Mitchell (footballer, born 1992) =

Northern Irish football coach

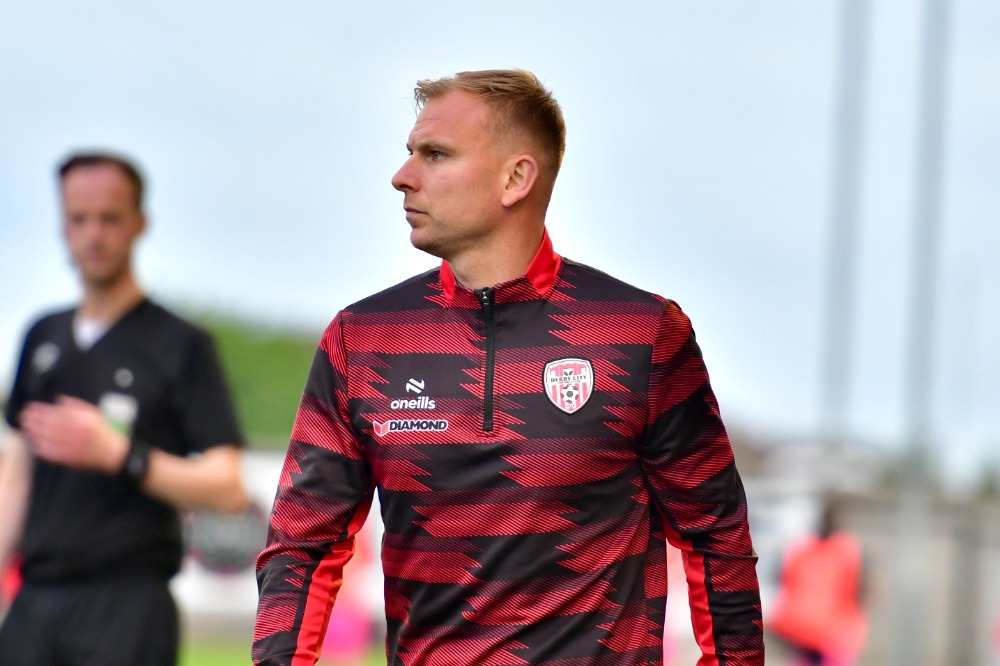
- Mitchell with Derry City in 2025

Personal information
- Full name: Andrew Mitchell
- Date of birth: 6 April 1992 (age 34)
- Place of birth: Glengormley, Northern Ireland
- Height: 1.80 m (5 ft 11 in)
- Positions: Full-back; midfielder

Team information
- Current team: Derry City (technical coach)

Youth career
- 2000–2006: Greenisland
- 2006–2010: Manchester City
- 2010–2014: Rangers

Senior career*
| Years | Team | Apps | (Gls) |
| 2010–2014 | Rangers | 9 | (0) |
| 2013 | → Annan Athletic (loan) | 22 | (4) |
| 2014 | Annan Athletic | 17 | (2) |
| 2014–2015 | Southport | 10 | (0) |
| 2015 | → Annan Athletic (loan) | 12 | (1) |
| 2015–2017 | Crusaders | 38 | (1) |
| 2017–2020 | Linfield | 50 | (5) |
| 2020–2023 | Larne | 53 | (9) |
| 2022–2023 | → Carrick Rangers (loan) | 31 | (7) |
| 2023–2025 | Carrick Rangers | 26 | (4) |
| Total | | 268 | (33) |

International career
| 2006–2007 | Northern Ireland U16 | 16 | (2) |
| 2007–2008 | Northern Ireland U17 | 12 | (1) |
| 2009–2011 | Northern Ireland U19 | 6 | (0) |
| 2012–2013 | Northern Ireland U21 | 10 | (1) |

Managerial career
- 2022–2024: Larne (youth academy)
- 2024: Larne (technical director)
- 2024–: Derry City (technical coach)
- * Club domestic league appearances and goals

Andrew Mitchell (born 6 April 1992) is a Northern Irish football manager and former player who is the technical coach of League of Ireland Premier Division club Derry City.

A former midfielder and defender, Mitchell began his playing career at Manchester City's youth academy. He later established himself at Rangers before continuing his career in Scotland, England and Northern Ireland. Mitchell played over 500 competitive games and won four league titles.

Born in Belfast, Northern Ireland, Mitchell represented Northern Ireland at every youth international level. He moved into coaching in 2022 with Larne Football Club, leading the U18s to their first Harry Cavan Cup final. In 2023, he became Youth Technical Director at Larne, and one year later he was appointed first-team coach of Derry City.

Mitchell started his playing career at Greenisland F.C. at the age of 8. He then joined Manchester City, featuring for the academy U16 and U18 teams as well as the reserves. At the age of 18, he moved to Rangers. He gained further experience with Annan Athletic, initially on loan before signing permanently after five years at Rangers. He moved to Southport in July 2014.

In 2015, Mitchell returned home to sign for NIFL Premiership champions Crusaders on a three-year deal, winning two league titles. He then moved to Linfield on a three-year contract. On 24 January 2020, Larne announced the signing of Mitchell after he mutually agreed to terminate his contract with Linfield.

In 2022, Mitchell joined NIFL Premiership side Carrick Rangers on a season-long loan. At the end of the season, he made the move permanent.

In 2025, Mitchell was appointed first-team coach of League of Ireland Premier Division club Derry City.

== Career ==
Mitchell began his career as a youth player with Northern Ireland side Greenisland. Mitchell was at Greenisland F.C. since he was 8 years old. Mitchell then moved to Premier League club Manchester City. He was a vital member in the under-18 side in the season of 2010. He was a big part of the Manchester City under–18 side that won the Al Ain International Championship in 2010, with a penalty shoot out, with Mitchell converting the winning penalty. Mitchell also reached the semi-final of the Dallas Cup with City in 2009, being knocked out by São Paulo.

Mitchell then joined Scottish Premier League club Rangers in May 2010, initially as a member of the club's under 19–squad. He was promoted to the first team squad on 3 March 2012, where he was an unused substitute against Heart of Midlothian. He went on to make his first team debut on 17 March 2012, in a 2–1 defeat to Dundee United. Mitchell also featured another four times after that in the first team including being an unused substitute in the Old Firm match which was a 3–2 win for Rangers at Ibrox.

On 1 July 2012, Mitchell signed a new one-year contract with Rangers. He was captain of the reserve side that lifted the reserve league trophy. Mitchell's first start of the 2012–13 season came shortly after. Despite playing out of position, at right full-back, Mitchell was voted as Man of the Match in the fixture against Clyde on Saturday 13 April 2013. Mitchell also featured in five other first team matches towards the conclusion of the season earning a man of the match award against Berwick Rangers on the final day of the season.

On 13 September 2013, Mitchell signed for Scottish League Two side Annan Athletic on a 93-day loan. On 23 November he scored his first career goal in a 4–4 draw with Stirling Albion.

On 17 January 2014 Mitchell's contract with Rangers was terminated by mutual consent and he rejoined Annan on a permanent deal until the end of the 2013–14 season due to the two club rule.

On 19 July 2014, Mitchell joined Southport in the Conference Premier.

On 2 February 2015, Mitchell joined Annan on loan to the end of the season for the third time.

On 25 May 2015, Mitchell sign for Crusaders.

== Career statistics ==
As of match played on 15 March 2019.

Appearances and goals by club, season and competition
| Club | Season | League | | | Cup (Note: Appearances in the Scottish Cup and Irish Cup.) | | League Cup (Note: Appearances in the Scottish League Cup and Northern Ireland Football League Cup.) | | Continental | | Other | | Total | |
| Club | Season | Division | Apps | Goals | Apps | Goals | Apps | Goals | Apps | Goals | Apps | Goals | Apps | Goals |
|---|---|---|---|---|---|---|---|---|---|---|---|---|---|---|
| Rangers | 2011–12 | Scottish Premier League | 2 | 0 | 0 | 0 | 0 | 0 | — | | — | | 2 | 0 |
| Rangers | 2012–13 | Scottish Third Division | 7 | 0 | 0 | 0 | 0 | 0 | — | | — | | 7 | 0 |
| Rangers | 2013–14 | Scottish League One | 0 | 0 | 0 | 0 | 1 | 0 | — | | — | | 1 | 0 |
| Rangers | Total | | 9 | 0 | 0 | 0 | 1 | 0 | — | | — | | 10 | 0 |
| Annan Athletic (Note: Part of the season was during a loan spell.) | 2013–14 | Scottish League Two | 27 | 5 | 4 | 0 | 0 | 0 | — | | 3 (Note: Appearances in the Scottish Challenge Cup and the Scottish League Two playoffs.) | 0 | 34 | 5 |
| Southport | 2014–15 | Football Conference | 10 | 0 | 2 | 0 | 0 | 0 | — | | 1 (Note: Appearances in the FA Trophy.) | 1 | 13 | 1 |
| Annan Athletic (loan) | 2014–15 | Scottish League Two | 12 | 1 | 0 | 0 | 0 | 0 | — | | — | | 12 | 1 |
| Crusaders | 2015–16 | NIFL Premiership | 22 | 1 | 3 | 1 | 1 | 2 | 4 (Note: Appearances in the UEFA Champions League.) | 1 | 1 (Note: Appearance in the NIFL Charity Shield.) | 0 | 27 | 4 |
| Crusaders | 2016–17 | NIFL Premiership | 16 | 0 | 1 | 0 | 2 | 0 | 2 | 0 | 2 (Note: Appearances in the Scottish Challenge Cup.) | 0 | 21 | 0 |
| Crusaders | Total | | 38 | 1 | 4 | 1 | 3 | 2 | 6 | 1 | 3 | 0 | 54 | 5 |
| Linfield | 2017–18 | NIFL Premiership | 20 | 3 | 1 | 0 | 1 | 0 | 2 | 0 | 2 (Note: Appearances in the NIFL Charity Shield and Scottish Challenge Cup.) | 1 | 24 | 4 |
| Linfield | 2018–19 | NIFL Premiership | 18 | 1 | 0 | 0 | 3 | 0 | — | | — | | 21 | 1 |
| Linfield | Total | | 38 | 4 | 1 | 0 | 4 | 0 | 2 | 0 | 2 | 1 | 47 | 5 |
| Career total | | | 134 | 11 | 11 | 1 | 7 | 2 | 8 | 1 | 9 | 2 | 170 | 17 |

== Honours ==
Rangers

- Scottish Third Division: 2012–13

Crusaders

- NIFL Premiership: 2015–16

Linfield

- NIFL Premiership: 2018-19
- Northern Ireland Football League Cup: 2018-19

Larne

- County Antrim Shield: (2) 2020–21, 2021-22
