= Rudolf Hollaender =

Dutch footballer

Personal information
- Full name: Rudolf Karel Hollaender
- Date of birth: 24 November 1968 (age 57)
- Position: Goalkeeper

Senior career*
Years	Team	Apps	(Gls)
2008–2021	HKFC		
- * Club domestic league appearances and goals

Rudolf Karel Hollaender (born 24 November 1968) is a Dutch former professional footballer.

Nicknamed Noorman, he had played amateur football in the Netherlands with WV-HEDW, but left them in 1995.

== Career statistics ==
=== Club ===
Appearances and goals by club, season and competition
Club	Season	League			Cup		League Cup		Other		Total	
Club	Season	Division	Apps	Goals	Apps	Goals	Apps	Goals	Apps	Goals	Apps	Goals
HKFC	2010–11	First Division	5	0	0	0	0	0	0	0	5	0
HKFC	2015–16	First Division	1	0	0	0	0	0	0	0	1	0
HKFC	2017–18	First Division	5	0	0	0	0	0	0	0	5	0
HKFC	Total		11	0	0	0	0	0	0	0	11	0
