= David Somers =

- Born: September 1948 (age 77); Scarborough, England
- Occupation: Pension fund manager

David Somers (born September 1948) is a chartered accountant and Pension Fund manager. From 2013 to 2015 he was the Chairman of Rangers Football Club.

== Career ==
Somers is a chartered accountant and is a non-executive director of ACE Europe Life which is part of the ACE Group of insurance and reinsurance companies. Somers was also a non-Executive Director and Chairman of the Audit & Risk Committee of Europe Arab Bank, he is the Independent Trustee & Chairman of the Investment Sub Committee at Fujitsu Technologies International Pension Plan and the Chairman of the Investment Committee at TCF Investment Managers Ltd.

Somers is the former chairman of Rangers Football Club. His appointment was announced on 7 November 2013 and it was ratified at the club's AGM on 19 December 2013. Somers left the board on 2 March 2015, before Dave King's takeover.
