= Malcolm Murray (businessman) =

Scottish businessman

Malcolm Alexander Murray
- Born: March 1955 (age 71); Ayrshire, Scotland
- Occupation: Pension fund manager

Malcolm Alexander Murray (born March 1955) is a Scottish businessman and former chairman of Rangers Football Club.

== Early life ==
Murray was educated at Strathclyde University.

== Business career ==
Murray's business career has mainly focussed on pension fund management, with him being involved in some of the largest funds in the UK, including Phillips and Drew. He also holds a senior independent director role with MWB Business Exchange PLC, having gained 31 years of experience in investment management prior to this.

== Football ==
=== Manchester United F.C. ===
In the early 1990s, Murray purchased and had stewardship of a 25% shareholding in Manchester United.

=== Rangers F.C. ===
On 14 June 2012, following the financial difficulties of Rangers and subsequent takeover by Charles Green's consortium, Murray was appointed as new chairman of the club. It was revealed that Murray is a lifelong fan of Rangers and a season ticket holder.

Murray survived several attempts to oust him as Rangers chairman before being replaced by former club manager, Walter Smith.
