= 2026–27 Celtic F.C. season =

Celtic F.C.
2026–27 season
- Chairman: Brian Wilson (interim)
- Manager: Martin O'Neill
- Stadium: Celtic Park
- Premiership: 1st
- Scottish Cup: Fourth round
- League Cup: Quarter-finals
- Champions League: Play-off round
- Europa League: League phase
- Top goalscorer: League: Camilo Durán (7); All: Camilo Durán (13)
| Home colours | Away colours | Third colours |

The 2026–27 season is Celtic's 133rd season of competitive football.

== Pre-season and friendlies ==
Celtic faced Shelbourne in early July before travelling to Portugal for a training camp, where they played a friendly against Sporting CP. On returning to Glasgow, they faced Middlesbrough and AC Milan at Celtic Park.

| 7 July 2026 Friendly | Shelbourne | 1–1 | Celtic | Drumcondra, Ireland |
| 18:00 IST | Wood 88' (pen.) | Report | Yamada 90+1' (pen.) | Stadium: Tolka Park |

| 14 July 2026 Friendly | Sporting CP | 4–1 | Celtic | Faro/Loulé, Portugal |
| 17:30 WEST | Catamo 25'; Bragança 72', 79'; Mangas 75' | Report | Durán 69' | Stadium: Estádio Algarve |

| 18 July 2026 Friendly | Celtic | 1–1 | Middlesbrough | Glasgow |
| 15:00 BST | Durán 30' | Report | Strelec 25' | Stadium: Celtic Park |

| 25 July 2026 Friendly | Celtic | 2–2 | AC Milan | Glasgow |
| 15:00 BST | Durán 11'; Forrest 27' | Report | Camarda 46' (pen.), 51' | Stadium: Celtic Park |

== Scottish Premiership ==
The Premiership fixture list was announced on 18 June 2026. Celtic began their title defence against Dundee at Celtic Park.

| 3 August 2026 | Celtic | 1–0 | Dundee | Glasgow |
| 19:30 BST | Nygren 52' | Report | | Stadium: Celtic Park; Attendance: 58,904; Referee: Matthew MacDermid |

| 9 August 2026 | Kilmarnock | 1–5 | Celtic | Kilmarnock |
| 13:30 BST | Schjønning-Larsen 56' | Report | Høgh 2', 33', 35'; Nygren 47'; McCowan 75' | Stadium: Rugby Park; Attendance: 8,353; Referee: Ryan Lee |

| 29 August 2026 | Celtic | 2–1 | Falkirk | Glasgow |
| 15:00 BST | Durán 4', 29' | Report | Donovan 72' (o.g.) | Stadium: Celtic Park; Attendance: 58,796; Referee: Chris Graham |

| 2 September 2026 | Celtic | 3–0 | Aberdeen | Glasgow |
| 19:45 BST | Durán 14'; Nygren 34'; Yang 45+1' | Report | | Stadium: Celtic Park; Attendance: 58,825; Referee: Duncan Nicolson |

| 5 September 2026 | St Mirren | 1–2 | Celtic | Paisley |
| 20:00 BST | Agrafiotis 22' (pen.) | Report | Scales 51'; Yang 68' | Stadium: St Mirren Park; Attendance: 6,911; Referee: Ryan Lee |

| 9 September 2026 | St Johnstone | 0–1 | Celtic | Perth |
| 20:00 BST | | Report | Baur 52' | Stadium: McDiarmid Park; Attendance: 9,879; Referee: Matthew MacDermid |

| 20 September 2026 | Celtic | 0–1 | Rangers | Glasgow |
| 12:00 BST | | Report | Naderi 33' | Stadium: Celtic Park; Attendance: 59,650; Referee: John Beaton |

| 11 October 2026 | Motherwell | 0–2 | Celtic | Motherwell |
| 12:00 BST | | Report | Durán 9'; Nygren 58' | Stadium: Fir Park; Attendance: 10,682; Referee: Steven McLean |

| 18 October 2026 | Celtic | 7–1 | Heart of Midlothian | Glasgow |
| 15:00 BST | Tierney 7'; Nygren 10', 83'; Osmand 36', 38'; Baur 45+1'; Durán 49' | Report | Mendy 41' | Stadium: Celtic Park; Attendance: 59,132; Referee: David Dickinson |

| 25 October 2026 | Hibernian | 1–2 | Celtic | Edinburgh |
| 12:00 BST | Elding 3' | Report | Kerr 5' (o.g.); Durán 43' | Stadium: Easter Road; Attendance: 17,389; Referee: Ryan Lee |

| 28 October 2026 | Celtic | 2–2 | Dundee United | Glasgow |
| 19:45 GMT | Durán 18'; Scales 65' | Report | Sapsford 28'; Farrugia 31' | Stadium: Celtic Park; Attendance: 57,969; Referee: Steven McLean |

| 1 November 2026 | Falkirk | 2–0 | Celtic | Falkirk |
| 13:00 GMT | Ross 3'; Tanser 38' | Report | | Stadium: Falkirk Stadium; Attendance: 6,981; Referee: Duncan Nicolson |

| 8 November 2026 | Celtic | 1–0 | Kilmarnock | Glasgow |
| 16:00 GMT | Scales 26' | Report | | Stadium: Celtic Park; Attendance: 58,269; Referee: John Beaton |

| 21 November 2026 | Celtic | 4–1 | St Mirren | Glasgow |
| 15:00 GMT | Oxlade-Chamberlain 33'; Durán 40'; McCowan 42'; McGregor 63' | Report | Phillips 70' (pen.) | Stadium: Celtic Park; Referee: Matthew MacDermid |

== Scottish Cup ==
Celtic will enter the Scottish Cup at the fourth round.

== Scottish League Cup ==
On 26 July, Celtic were drawn against Dundee United in the second round of the 2026–27 Scottish League Cup. On 16 August, Celtic were drawn against Rangers in the quarter-finals.

| 15 August 2026 Second round | Dundee United | 0–4 | Celtic | Dundee |
| 17:45 BST | | Report | Trusty 22'; Durán 24'; Tounekti 54'; Nygren 63' | Stadium: Tannadice Park; Attendance: 9,136; Referee: Steven McLean |

| 13 September 2026 Quarter-finals | Rangers | 3–0 | Celtic | Glasgow |
| 12:00 BST | Neil 23', 75'; Kelsy 59' | Report | | Stadium: Ibrox Stadium; Attendance: 51,212; Referee: Nick Walsh |

== UEFA Champions League ==
=== Play-off round ===
On 3 August, Celtic were drawn against LASK in the UEFA Champions League play-off round.

| 19 August 2026 First leg | Celtic (Scotland) | 3–0 | (Austria) LASK | Glasgow |
| 20:00 BST | Nygren 26'; Durán 38', 67' | Report | | Stadium: Celtic Park; Attendance: 55,882; Referee: Sandro Schärer (Switzerland) |

| 25 August 2026 Second leg | LASK (Austria) | 5–1 (a.e.t.) (5–4 agg.) | (Scotland) Celtic | Linz, Austria |
| 21:00 CEST | Usor 32'; Ljubičić 48'; Adeniran 58', 109'; Flecker 90' | Report | McGregor 21' | Stadium: Raiffeisen Arena; Attendance: 16,252; Referee: Szymon Marciniak (Poland) |

== UEFA Europa League ==
Celtic will enter the UEFA Europa League at the league phase.

=== League phase ===
On 28 August, the draw for the league phase was made. Celtic were drawn with Marseille and Benfica (Pot 1), Ferencváros and Union Saint-Gilloise (Pot 2), Celta Vigo and Omonia (Pot 3), and Beşiktaş and Torreense (Pot 4).

| Pos | Team | Pld | W | D | L | GF | GA | GD | Pts |
|---|---|---|---|---|---|---|---|---|---|
| 30 | (Czech Republic) Viktoria Plzeň | 4 | 1 | 0 | 3 | 3 | 7 | −4 | 3 |
| 31 | (France) Marseille | 4 | 1 | 0 | 3 | 2 | 6 | −4 | 3 |
| 32 | (Scotland) Celtic | 4 | 1 | 0 | 3 | 6 | 11 | −5 | 3 |
| 33 | (Israel) Hapoel Be'er Sheva | 4 | 0 | 1 | 3 | 1 | 8 | −7 | 1 |
| 34 | (Norway) Lillestrøm | 4 | 0 | 1 | 3 | 2 | 10 | −8 | 1 |

Updated to match(es) played on 5 November 2026. Source: UEFA
Rules for classification: League phase tiebreakers

==== Matches ====
| 17 September 2026 Matchday 1 | Celtic (Scotland) | 1–3 | (Hungary) Ferencváros | Glasgow |
| 20:00 BST | Baur 44' | Report | Yusuf 20'; Zachariassen 45+1'; Arzani 47' | Stadium: Celtic Park; Attendance: 48,223; Referee: Patrik Kolarić (Croatia) |

| 15 October 2026 Matchday 2 | Benfica (Portugal) | 4–1 | (Scotland) Celtic | Lisbon, Portugal |
| 21:00 WEST | J. Durán 5' (pen.), 36'; Bah 23'; Pavlidis 89' | Report | C. Durán 63' | Stadium: Estádio da Luz; Attendance: 58,870; Referee: Nikola Dabanović (Montenegro) |

| 22 October 2026 Matchday 3 | Celtic (Scotland) | 1–2 | (Spain) Celta Vigo | Glasgow |
| 20:00 BST | Baur 47' | Report | Rodríguez 68', 71' | Stadium: Celtic Park; Attendance: 48,374; Referee: Georgi Kabakov (Bulgaria) |

| 5 November 2026 Matchday 4 | Celtic (Scotland) | 3–2 | (Turkey) Beşiktaş | Glasgow |
| 20:00 GMT | Osmand 62'; Durán 78', 87' | Report | Olaitan 54'; Kökçü 86' | Stadium: Celtic Park; Attendance: 44,394; Referee: Sascha Stegemann (Germany) |

| 26 November 2026 Matchday 5 | Torreense (Portugal) | v | (Scotland) Celtic | Leiria, Portugal |
| 21:00 WET | | Report | | Stadium: Estádio Dr. Magalhães Pessoa |

| 10 December 2026 Matchday 6 | Omonia (Cyprus) | v | (Scotland) Celtic | Strovolos, Cyprus |
| 19:45 EET | | Report | | Stadium: GSP Stadium |

| 21 January 2027 Matchday 7 | Celtic (Scotland) | v | (France) Marseille | Glasgow |
| 20:00 GMT | | Report | | Stadium: Celtic Park |

| 28 January 2027 Matchday 8 | Union Saint-Gilloise (Belgium) | v | (Scotland) Celtic | Heverlee, Belgium |
| 21:00 CET | | Report | | Stadium: Den Dreef |

== Statistics ==
=== Appearances and goals ===
| No. | Pos | Nat | Player | Total | | Premiership | | Scottish Cup | | League Cup | | Champions League | | Europa League | |
| No. | Pos | Nat | Player | Apps | Goals | Apps | Goals | Apps | Goals | Apps | Goals | Apps | Goals | Apps | Goals |
Goalkeepers
| 1 | GK | (Finland) FIN | Viljami Sinisalo | 13 | 0 | 8 | 0 | 0 | 0 | 1 | 0 | 2 | 0 | 2 | 0 |
| 26 | GK | (England) ENG | Sam Johnstone | 9 | 0 | 6 | style="text-align: center;" | 0 | 0 | 0 | 1 | 0 | 0 | 0 | 2 | 0 |
| 31 | GK | (Scotland) SCO | Ross Doohan | 0 | 0 | 0 | 0 | 0 | 0 | 0 | 0 | 0 | 0 | 0 | 0 |
Defenders
| 2 | DF | (Canada) CAN | Alistair Johnston | 3 | 0 | 3 | 0 | 0 | 0 | 0 | 0 | 0 | 0 | 0 | 0 |
| 3 | DF | (Switzerland) SUI | Jordan Lotomba | 4 | 0 | 1 | 0 | 0 | 0 | 1 | 0 | 0 | 0 | 2 | 0 |
| 5 | DF | (Republic of Ireland) IRL | Liam Scales | 19 | 3 | 12 | 3 | 0 | 0 | 2 | 0 | 2 | 0 | 3 | 0 |
| 6 | DF | (United States) USA | Auston Trusty | 12 | 1 | 8 | 0 | 0 | 0 | 1 | 1 | 2 | 0 | 1 | 0 |
| 12 | DF | (England) ENG | Landon Emenalo | 2 | 0 | 2 | 0 | 0 | 0 | 0 | 0 | 0 | 0 | 0 | 0 |
| 20 | DF | (United States) USA | Cameron Carter-Vickers | 16 | 0 | 10 | 0 | 0 | 0 | 2 | 0 | 2 | 0 | 2 | 0 |
| 47 | DF | (Scotland) SCO | Dane Murray | 12 | 0 | 7 | 0 | 0 | 0 | 1 | 0 | 1 | 0 | 3 | 0 |
| 51 | DF | (Scotland) SCO | Colby Donovan | 22 | 0 | 14 | 0 | 0 | 0 | 2 | 0 | 2 | 0 | 4 | 0 |
| 56 | DF | (Scotland) SCO | Anthony Ralston | 3 | 0 | 0 | 0 | 0 | 0 | 0 | 0 | 2 | 0 | 1 | 0 |
| 63 | DF | (Scotland) SCO | Kieran Tierney | 19 | 1 | 12 | 1 | 0 | 0 | 1 | 0 | 2 | 0 | 4 | 0 |
Midfielders
| 8 | MF | (Sweden) SWE | Benjamin Nygren | 21 | 8 | 13 | 6 | 0 | 0 | 2 | 1 | 2 | 1 | 4 | 0 |
| 14 | MF | (Scotland) SCO | Luke McCowan | 10 | 2 | 7 | 2 | 0 | 0 | 1 | 0 | 1 | 0 | 1 | 0 |
| 18 | MF | (Denmark) DEN | Oliver Sørensen | 7 | 0 | 4 | 0 | 0 | 0 | 0 | 0 | 0 | 0 | 3 | 0 |
| 21 | MF | (England) ENG | Alex Oxlade-Chamberlain | 10 | 1 | 7 | 1 | 0 | 0 | 2 | 0 | 0 | 0 | 1 | 0 |
| 22 | MF | (Germany) GER | Mika Baur | 19 | 4 | 11 | 2 | 0 | 0 | 2 | 0 | 2 | 0 | 4 | 2 |
| 35 | MF | (Netherlands) NED | Joël van den Berg | 1 | 0 | 1 | 0 | 0 | 0 | 0 | 0 | 0 | 0 | 0 | 0 |
| 42 | MF | (Scotland) SCO | Callum McGregor (captain) | 21 | 2 | 13 | 1 | 0 | 0 | 2 | 0 | 2 | 1 | 4 | 0 |
Forwards
| 7 | FW | (Portugal) POR | Jota | 6 | 0 | 6 | 0 | 0 | 0 | 0 | 0 | 0 | 0 | 0 | 0 |
| 9 | FW | (Denmark) DEN | Kasper Høgh | 18 | 3 | 10 | 3 | 0 | 0 | 2 | 0 | 2 | 0 | 4 | 0 |
| 11 | FW | (Colombia) COL | Camilo Durán | 22 | 14 | 14 | 8 | 0 | 0 | 2 | 1 | 2 | 2 | 4 | 3 |
| 13 | FW | (South Korea) KOR | Yang Hyun-jun | 9 | 2 | 7 | 2 | 0 | 0 | 0 | 0 | 2 | 0 | 0 | 0 |
| 17 | FW | (Tunisia) TUN | Sebastian Tounekti | 17 | 1 | 9 | 0 | 0 | 0 | 2 | 1 | 2 | 0 | 4 | 0 |
| 19 | FW | (England) ENG | Callum Osmand | 10 | 3 | 7 | 2 | 0 | 0 | 0 | 0 | 0 | 0 | 3 | 1 |
| 23 | FW | (Egypt) EGY | Haissem Hassan | 17 | 0 | 10 | 0 | 0 | 0 | 2 | 0 | 1 | 0 | 4 | 0 |
| 29 | FW | (England) ENG | Shim Mheuka | 9 | 0 | 8 | 0 | 0 | 0 | 1 | 0 | 0 | 0 | 0 | 0 |
| 49 | FW | (Scotland) SCO | James Forrest | 16 | 0 | 11 | 0 | 0 | 0 | 2 | 0 | 0 | 0 | 3 | 0 |
Departures
| 27 | MF | (Belgium) BEL | Arne Engels | 2 | 0 | 2 | 0 | 0 | 0 | 0 | 0 | 0 | 0 | 0 | 0 |
| 41 | MF | (Japan) JPN | Reo Hatate | 2 | 0 | 0 | 0 | 0 | 0 | 0 | 0 | 2 | 0 | 0 | 0 |

Last updated: 21 November 2026
Source: Competitions

Notes

1. Player left the club during the season

=== Goalscorers ===
| R | No. | Pos. | Nation | Name | Premiership | Scottish Cup | League Cup | Champions League | Europa League | Total |
|---|---|---|---|---|---|---|---|---|---|---|
| 1 | 11 | FW | (Colombia) | Camilo Durán | 8 | 0 | 1 | 2 | 3 | 14 |
| 2 | 8 | MF | (Sweden) | Benjamin Nygren | 6 | 0 | 1 | 1 | 0 | 8 |
| 3 | 22 | MF | (Germany) | Mika Baur | 2 | 0 | 0 | 0 | 2 | 4 |
| 4 | 5 | DF | (Republic of Ireland) | Liam Scales | 3 | 0 | 0 | 0 | 0 | 3 |
| 4 | 9 | FW | (Denmark) | Kasper Høgh | 3 | 0 | 0 | 0 | 0 | 3 |
| 4 | 19 | FW | (England) | Callum Osmand | 2 | 0 | 0 | 0 | 1 | 3 |
| 7 | 13 | FW | (South Korea) | Yang Hyun-jun | 2 | 0 | 0 | 0 | 0 | 2 |
| 8 | 6 | DF | (United States) | Auston Trusty | 0 | 0 | 1 | 0 | 0 | 1 |
| 8 | 14 | MF | (Scotland) | Luke McCowan | 1 | 0 | 0 | 0 | 0 | 1 |
| 8 | 17 | FW | (Tunisia) | Sebastian Tounekti | 0 | 0 | 1 | 0 | 0 | 1 |
| 8 | 42 | MF | (Scotland) | Callum McGregor | 0 | 0 | 0 | 1 | 0 | 1 |
| 8 | 63 | DF | (Scotland) | Kieran Tierney | 1 | 0 | 0 | 0 | 0 | 1 |
| Own goals | | | | | 1 | 0 | 0 | 0 | 0 | 1 |
| Total | | | | | 28 | 0 | 4 | 4 | 6 | 42 |

Last updated: 8 November 2026

=== Disciplinary record ===
Includes all competitive matches. Players listed below made at least one appearance for Celtic first squad during the season.

| N | P | Nat. | Name | Premiership | | | Scottish Cup | | | League Cup | | | Champions League | | | Europa League | | | Total | | | Notes |
| N | P | Nat. | Name | Yellow card | Second yellow card | Red card | Yellow card | Second yellow card | Red card | Yellow card | Second yellow card | Red card | Yellow card | Second yellow card | Red card | Yellow card | Second yellow card | Red card | Yellow card | Second yellow card | Red card | Notes |
| 51 | DF | (Scotland) | Colby Donovan | 4 | | | | | | 1 | | | | | | 1 | | | 6 | | | |
| 5 | DF | (Republic of Ireland) | Liam Scales | 2 | | | | | | | | | | | | 1 | | | 3 | | | |
| 8 | MF | (Sweden) | Benjamin Nygren | | | | | | | 1 | | | | | | 1 | | | 2 | | | |
| 9 | FW | (Denmark) | Kasper Høgh | 2 | | | | | | | | | | | | | | | 2 | | | |
| 20 | DF | (United States) | Cameron Carter-Vickers | 1 | | | | | | 1 | | | | | | | | | 2 | | | |
| 22 | MF | (Germany) | Mika Baur | 2 | | | | | | | | | | | | | | | 2 | | | |
| 23 | FW | (Egypt) | Haissem Hassan | 1 | | | | | | 1 | | | | | | | | | 2 | | | |
| 63 | DF | (Scotland) | Kieran Tierney | 2 | | | | | | | | | | | | | | | 2 | | | |
| 3 | DF | (Switzerland) | Jordan Lotomba | 1 | | | | | | | | | | | | | | | 1 | | | |
| 7 | FW | (Portugal) | Jota | 1 | | | | | | | | | | | | | | | 1 | | | |
| 11 | FW | (Colombia) | Camilo Durán | | | | | | | | | | | | | 1 | | | 1 | | | |
| 13 | FW | (South Korea) | Yang Hyun-jun | 1 | | | | | | | | | | | | | | | 1 | | | |
| 14 | MF | (Scotland) | Luke McCowan | | | | | | | | | | 1 | | | | | | 1 | | | |
| 17 | FW | (Tunisia) | Sebastian Tounekti | 1 | | | | | | | | | | | | | | | 1 | | | |
| 18 | MF | (Denmark) | Oliver Sørensen | | | | | | | | | | | | | 1 | | | 1 | | | |
| 27 | MF | (Belgium) | Arne Engels | 1 | | | | | | | | | | | | | | | 1 | | | |
| 29 | FW | (England) | Shim Mheuka | 1 | | | | | | | | | | | | | | | 1 | | | |
| 42 | MF | (Scotland) | Callum McGregor | 1 | | | | | | | | | | | | | | | 1 | | | |
| 49 | FW | (Scotland) | James Forrest | 1 | | | | | | | | | | | | | | | 1 | | | |

Last updated: 8 November 2026
Source: Competitive matches
Only competitive matches
(yellow card) = Number of bookings; (second yellow card) = Number of sending offs after a second yellow card; (red card) = Number of sending offs by a direct red card.

=== Hat-tricks ===
| Player | Against | Result | Date | Competition |
|---|---|---|---|---|
| (Denmark) Kasper Høgh | (Scotland) Kilmarnock | 5–1 (A) | 9 August 2026 | Premiership |

(H) – Home; (A) – Away; (N) – Neutral

=== Clean sheets ===
As of 8 November 2026.

| Rank | Name | Premiership | Scottish Cup | League Cup | Champions League | Europa League | Total | Played Games |
|---|---|---|---|---|---|---|---|---|
| 1 | (Finland) Viljami Sinisalo | 3 | 0 | 1 | 1 | 0 | 5 | 13 |
| 2 | (England) Sam Johnstone | 2 | 0 | 0 | 0 | 0 | 2 | 8 |
| Total | | 5 | 0 | 1 | 1 | 0 | 7 | 21 |

=== Attendances ===
As of match played 8 November 2026

| | Matches | Attendances | Average | High | Low |
|---|---|---|---|---|---|
| Premiership | 7 | 411,545 | 58,792 | 59,650 | 57,969 |
| Scottish Cup | 0 | 0 | 0 | 0 | 0 |
| League Cup | 0 | 0 | 0 | 0 | 0 |
| Champions League | 1 | 55,882 | 55,882 | 55,882 | N/A |
| Europa League | 3 | 140,991 | 46,997 | 48,374 | 44,394 |
| Total | 11 | 608,418 | 55,310 | 59,650 | 44,394 |

== Team statistics ==
=== League table ===
| Pos | Team | Pld | W | D | L | GF | GA | GD | Pts | Qualification or relegation (Note: Teams play each other three times (33 matches), before the league is split into two groups (the top six and the bottom six).) |
|---|---|---|---|---|---|---|---|---|---|---|
| 1 | Celtic | 14 | 11 | 1 | 2 | 32 | 11 | +21 | 34 | Qualification for the Champions League second qualifying round |
| 2 | Rangers | 13 | 9 | 3 | 1 | 23 | 10 | +13 | 30 | Qualification for the Conference League second qualifying round (Note: The winners of the 2026–27 Scottish Cup will qualify for the Europa League. If the cup winners also win the league, the spot reserved for the cup winners (Europa League first qualifying round) will pass to the second-placed team, and the spots for the Conference League second qualifying round will move down one league position.) |
| 3 | Falkirk | 14 | 7 | 3 | 4 | 22 | 15 | +7 | 24 | Qualification for the Conference League second qualifying round |
| 4 | Heart of Midlothian | 13 | 7 | 2 | 4 | 34 | 22 | +12 | 23 | |
| 5 | Dundee United | 13 | 5 | 5 | 3 | 21 | 17 | +4 | 20 | |

Updated to match(es) played on 21 November 2026. Source:
Rules for classification: 1) Points; 2) Goal difference; 3) Goals scored; 4) Head-to-head points; 5) Head-to-head goal difference; 6) Play-off (only if deciding champion, UEFA competition qualification, second stage group allocation, or relegation).

=== Competition overview ===
| Competition | First match | Last match | Starting round | Final position | Record | | | | | | | |
| Competition | First match | Last match | Starting round | Final position | Pld | W | D | L | GF | GA | GD | Win % |
|---|---|---|---|---|---|---|---|---|---|---|---|---|
| Premiership | 3 August 2026 | | Round 1 | | 13 | 10 | 1 | 2 | 28 | 10 | +18 | 76.92 |
| Scottish Cup | 16/17 January 2027 | | Fourth round | | 0 | 0 | 0 | 0 | 0 | 0 | +0 | — |
| League Cup | 15 August 2026 | 13 September 2026 | Second round | Quarter-finals | 2 | 1 | 0 | 1 | 4 | 3 | +1 | 50.00 |
| Champions League | 19 August 2026 | 25 August 2026 | Play-off round | Play-off round | 2 | 1 | 0 | 1 | 4 | 5 | −1 | 50.00 |
| Europa League | 17 September 2026 | | League phase | | 4 | 1 | 0 | 3 | 6 | 11 | −5 | 25.00 |
| Total | | | | | 21 | 13 | 1 | 7 | 42 | 29 | +13 | 61.90 |

Source: Soccerway

== Club ==
=== Management ===
| Position | Name |
|---|---|
| Manager | (Northern Ireland) Martin O'Neill |
| Assistant managers | (Scotland) Shaun Maloney (Scotland) Mark Fotheringham |
| First team coach | (Scotland) Stephen McManus |
| Goalkeeping coach | (Scotland) Stevie Woods |
| Set piece coach | (Scotland) Ross Grant |

=== Kit ===
Supplier: Adidas / Sponsors: Dafabet

The club is in the second year of a new deal with Adidas – the club's official kit supplier since 2020.

| Home | Away | Third | Goalkeeper 1 | Goalkeeper 2 | Goalkeeper 3 | Goalkeeper 4 |

- Home: The home kit celebrates the 60th anniversary of Celtic's victory in the 1967 European Cup final. The jersey features the traditional green and white hoops with gold details and a special crest honouring the Lisbon Lions. White shorts and socks complete the look.
- Away: The away kit pays tribute to the fans and players who made history in Lisbon. The shirt features green and black vertical stripes in a zigzag design and is accompanied by black shorts and matching socks.
- Third: The third kit features a desert sand shirt with a dark green trim and a design inspired by the tiles at the entrance to the Estádio Nacional. The shirt is accompanied by dark green shorts and matching socks.

== Transfers ==
=== In ===
| Pos | Player | From | Type | Window | Fee |
|---|---|---|---|---|---|
| FW | (Colombia) Camilo Durán | (Azerbaijan) Qarabağ | Transfer | Summer | Undisclosed |
| FW | (Denmark) Kasper Høgh | (Norway) Bodø/Glimt | Transfer | Summer | Undisclosed |
| FW | (Egypt) Haissem Hassan | (Spain) Real Oviedo | Transfer | Summer | Undisclosed |
| MF | (Germany) Mika Baur | (Germany) SC Paderborn | Transfer | Summer | Undisclosed |
| MF | (Denmark) Oliver Sørensen | (Italy) Parma | Loan | Summer | Loan |
| GK | (England) Sam Johnstone | (England) Wolverhampton Wanderers | Loan | Summer | Loan |
| FW | (England) Shim Mheuka | (England) Chelsea | Loan | Summer | Loan |
| DF | (England) Landon Emenalo | (England) Chelsea | Loan | Summer | Loan |
| MF | (Netherlands) Joël van den Berg | (Netherlands) PSV Eindhoven | Transfer | Summer | Undisclosed |
| DF | (Switzerland) Jordan Lotomba | (Netherlands) Feyenoord | Transfer | Summer | Undisclosed |

=== Out ===
| Pos | Player | To | Type | Window | Fee |
|---|---|---|---|---|---|
| GK | (Denmark) Kasper Schmeichel | Retired | | | |
| GK | (Northern Ireland) Josh Clarke | (Scotland) Partick Thistle | Transfer | Summer | Free |
| DF | (Scotland) Ben McPherson | (Scotland) Partick Thistle | Transfer | Summer | Free |
| MF | (Scotland) Ben Summers | (Scotland) Ayr United | Transfer | Summer | Free |
| FW | (Honduras) Luis Palma | (Poland) Lech Poznań | Transfer | Summer | Undisclosed |
| DF | (Scotland) Stephen Welsh | (Wales) Swansea City | Transfer | Summer | Free |
| DF | (Scotland) Andrew Kyle | (Scotland) East Kilbride | Transfer | Summer | Free |
| DF | (Japan) Hayato Inamura | (Japan) FC Tokyo | Transfer | Summer | Undisclosed |
| FW | (Scotland) Tom Pickford | Unattached | Transfer | Summer | Free |
| GK | (Scotland) Aidan Rice | (Scotland) Dumbarton | Loan | Summer | Loan |
| FW | (Poland) Filip Skorb | (Italy) Lecce | Transfer | Summer | Undisclosed |
| FW | (Japan) Shin Yamada | (Belgium) OH Leuven | Loan | Summer | Loan |
| FW | (Nigeria) Kelechi Iheanacho | (Turkey) Bursaspor | Transfer | Summer | Free |
| DF | (Poland) Maik Nawrocki | (France) Lens | Transfer | Summer | Undisclosed |
| MF | (Poland) Robert Rachwał | (Poland) Podhale Nowy Targ | Transfer | Summer | Free |
| FW | (Japan) Daizen Maeda | (England) Ipswich Town | Transfer | Summer | Undisclosed |
| MF | (Scotland) Owen Hartington | (Scotland) Dumbarton | Loan | Summer | Loan |
| MF | (Portugal) Paulo Bernardo | (Poland) Górnik Zabrze | Loan | Summer | Loan |
| DF | (Scotland) Ronan Ferns | (Republic of Ireland) Finn Harps | Transfer | Summer | Free |
| MF | (Belgium) Arne Engels | (England) West Ham United | Transfer | Summer | Undisclosed |
| DF | (Scotland) Adam Montgomery | (Scotland) Livingston | Loan | Summer | Loan |
| FW | (Scotland) Thomas Hatton | (Scotland) Ayr United | Loan | Summer | Loan |
| MF | (Scotland) Jude Bonnar | (Scotland) Arbroath | Loan | Summer | Loan |
| MF | (Scotland) Kyle Ure | (England) Crewe Alexandra | Loan | Summer | Loan |
| FW | (Scotland) Rhys Dargie | (Scotland) East Kilbride | Loan | Summer | Loan |
| FW | (Democratic Republic of the Congo) Michel-Ange Balikwisha | (Belgium) Gent | Loan | Summer | Loan |
| MF | (Japan) Reo Hatate | (England) Burnley | Transfer | Summer | Undisclosed |
| FW | (Republic of Ireland) Johnny Kenny | (England) Preston North End | Transfer | Summer | Undisclosed |
| GK | (Republic of Ireland) Marcus Gill | (Scotland) East Kilbride | Loan | Summer | Loan |
| MF | (Scotland) Liam Kennedy | (Scotland) East Kilbride | Loan | Summer | Loan |
| MF | (Northern Ireland) Francis Turley | (Scotland) Dumbarton | Loan | Summer | Loan |

== See also ==
- List of Celtic F.C. seasons
