= Callum Osmand =

Jèrriais footballer (born 2005)

Personal information
- Full name: Callum James Osmand
- Date of birth: 8 November 2005 (age 21)
- Place of birth: Jersey, Channel Islands
- Height: 5 ft 10 in (1.79 m)
- Position: Forward

Team information
- Current team: Celtic
- Number: 19

Youth career
- Grouville
- 2019–2025: Fulham

Senior career*
Years	Team	Apps	(Gls)
2025–	Celtic	9	(3)

International career
2021	Wales U16	1	(1)
2021	Wales U17	4	(1)
- * Club domestic league appearances and goals as of 14:31, 21 November 2026 (UTC)

Callum James Osmand (born 8 November 2005) is a professional footballer who plays as a forward for Scottish Premiership club Celtic. A former youth international for Wales, he is only eligible to represent England at senior level due to a rule change concerning players from the Channel Islands. He is affectionately nicknamed 'The Heartbreak Kid'

== Club career ==
=== Fulham ===
Osmand signed with Premier League club Fulham at youth and development level in 2018, at the age of 13, following time playing in Jersey for Grouville, before signing his first professional contract in June 2023.

=== Celtic ===
On 30 June 2025, Osmand signed a four-year contract with Celtic. He cited the club's "winning mentality" as a reason for joining. Manager Brendan Rodgers said, "We are really pleased to bring Callum to Celtic. He is a highly-rated, talented young player. He has some real attributes. He's a quick and powerful striker and I'm really looking forward to working with him. I'm sure he can be really successful with us".

Despite this praise, Osmand did not play a single minute under Rodgers, failing to even make a matchday squad. After Rodgers' resignation, his replacement Martin O'Neill gave Osmand his debut on 29 October 2025 against Falkirk in the Scottish Premiership, in O'Neill's first game in charge. He came on as a substitute for the final 15 minutes; this was also his first senior appearance as a footballer. Four days later, Osmand netted his first senior goal, scoring Celtic's third in their 3–1 victory over Rangers in the Scottish League Cup semi-final. In his third game, a Europa League tie against Midtjylland, he was stretchered off with a hamstring injury. O'Neill stated that Osmand would be out of action "for months".

He finally made his return to action on 16 May 2026, coming on as a substitute against Heart of Midlothian in the final game of the league season. Osmand provided the assist for Daizen Maeda's goal to give their side the lead, then in injury time he scored the final goal in a 3–1 victory to seal the title.

Following Celtic's 2–0 win over Falkirk on 29 August 2026, in which he came on as a 70th-minute substitute, Osmand was seen leaving Celtic Park on crutches. It was later reported that he faced several weeks out with an ankle injury. He made his long-awaited return on 15 October against Benfica in the Europa League, coming on as a substitute for Sebastian Tounekti and playing the second half in an unfamiliar left wing role. This was followed by his first ever start against Hearts three days later where he scored twice in a 7–1 demolition at Celtic Park.

== International career ==
Osmand was born in Jersey and played for Wales' under-16 and under-17 sides in 2021, which he was eligible to do as the rules at the time permitted someone born in the Channel Islands to represent any UK nation internationally, regardless of family ties. These rules were subsequently changed, however, meaning that Osmand is only eligible to represent England at senior level as he has no Welsh, Scottish or Northern Irish family.

== Career statistics ==
As of match played 21 November 2026

Appearances and goals by club, season and competition
Club	Season	League			Scottish Cup		League Cup		Europe		Total	
Club	Season	Division	Apps	Goals	Apps	Goals	Apps	Goals	Apps	Goals	Apps	Goals
Celtic	2025–26	Scottish Premiership	2	1	0	0	1	1	1 (Note: Appearance in UEFA Europa League)	0	4	2
Celtic	2026–27	Scottish Premiership	7	2	0	0	0	0	3	1	10	3
Career total			9	3	0	0	1	1	4	1	14	5

== Honours ==
Celtic

- Scottish Premiership: 2025–26
- Scottish Cup: 2025–26
