= 2025–26 Celtic F.C. season =

Celtic F.C.
2025–26 season
- Chairman: Peter Lawwell (until 31 December); Brian Wilson (interim; from 1 January 2026)
- Manager: Brendan Rodgers (until 27 October); Martin O'Neill (interim; from 27 October until 4 December); Wilfried Nancy (from 4 December until 5 January 2026); Martin O'Neill (from 5 January 2026)
- Stadium: Celtic Park
- Premiership: 1st
- Scottish Cup: Winners
- League Cup: Runners-up
- Champions League: Play-off round
- Europa League: Knockout phase play-offs
- Top goalscorer: League: Benjamin Nygren (16); All: Benjamin Nygren (21)
- Average home league attendance: 58,558
Home colours	Away colours	Third colours

The 2025–26 season was Celtic's 132nd season of competitive football.

== Pre-season and friendlies ==
Celtic faced Queen's Park and Cork City in early July. They then travelled to Portugal for a pre-season training camp, where they played Estrela da Amadora and Sporting CP. On returning to Glasgow, the Scottish champions faced Newcastle United at Celtic Park. Their pre-season schedule concluded with a mini tournament in Italy, where they played Ajax and Al-Ahli.

4 July 2025 Friendly	Queen's Park	0–1	Celtic	Glasgow
19:45 BST		Report	Kenny 20'	Stadium: Lesser Hampden

8 July 2025 Cork Super Cup	Cork City	1–2	Celtic	Cork, Ireland
18:00 IST	Murray 66'	Report	McCowan 27'; Donovan 87'	Stadium: Páirc Uí Chaoimh

12 July 2025 Friendly	Estrela da Amadora	3–2	Celtic	Seixal, Portugal
11:00 WEST	Godoy 37' (pen.); Otávio 44'; Cabral 65'	Report	Hatate 7'; Idah 53'	Stadium: Benfica Campus

16 July 2025 Friendly	Sporting CP	0–2	Celtic	Faro/Loulé, Portugal
19:30 WEST		Report	Hatate 47' (pen.); McCowan 71'	Stadium: Estádio Algarve

19 July 2025 Adidas Trophy	Celtic	4–0	Newcastle United	Glasgow
15:00 BST	Engels 28' (pen.); Kenny 45'; Yang 53'; Scales 74'	Report		Stadium: Celtic Park

24 July 2025 Como Cup	Ajax	5–1	Celtic	Como, Italy
20:30 CEST	Berghuis 16', 59'; Klaassen 47'; Bouwman 70'; Bounida 83'	Report	Yang 21'	Stadium: Stadio Giuseppe Sinigaglia

26 July 2025 Como Cup	Al-Ahli	1–1	Celtic	Como, Italy
20:30 CEST	Galeno 22'	Report	Trusty 49'	Stadium: Stadio Giuseppe Sinigaglia

== Scottish Premiership ==
The Premiership fixture list was announced on 20 June 2025. Celtic began their title defence against St Mirren at Celtic Park.

3 August 2025	Celtic	1–0	St Mirren	Glasgow
16:30 BST	McCowan 87'	Report		Stadium: Celtic Park; Attendance: 58,814; Referee: Don Robertson

10 August 2025	Aberdeen	0–2	Celtic	Aberdeen
12:30 BST		Report	Nygren 27'; Hatate 66'	Stadium: Pittodrie Stadium; Attendance: 18,388; Referee: John Beaton

23 August 2025	Celtic	3–0	Livingston	Glasgow
15:00 BST	Nygren 47', 71'; Kenny 76'	Report		Stadium: Celtic Park; Attendance: 58,548; Referee: Kevin Clancy

31 August 2025	Rangers	0–0	Celtic	Glasgow
12:00 BST		Report		Stadium: Ibrox Stadium; Attendance: 50,013; Referee: Don Robertson

14 September 2025	Kilmarnock	1–2	Celtic	Kilmarnock
15:00 BST	Watson 83'	Report	Maeda 56'; Iheanacho 90+6' (pen.)	Stadium: Rugby Park; Attendance: 8,499; Referee: John Beaton

27 September 2025	Celtic	0–0	Hibernian	Glasgow
15:00 BST		Report		Stadium: Celtic Park; Attendance: 58,980; Referee: Don Robertson

5 October 2025	Celtic	3–2	Motherwell	Glasgow
15:00 BST	Iheanacho 28' (pen.); Nygren 69'; Maeda 90+2'	Report	Stamatelopoulos 40', 56' (pen.)	Stadium: Celtic Park; Attendance: 58,563; Referee: Calum Scott

19 October 2025	Dundee	2–0	Celtic	Dundee
12:00 BST	Robertson 18'; Carter-Vickers 45+1' (o.g.)	Report		Stadium: Dens Park; Attendance: 8,318; Referee: Matthew MacDermid

26 October 2025	Heart of Midlothian	3–1	Celtic	Edinburgh
12:00 GMT	Murray 8' (o.g.); Kyziridis 52'; Shankland 55' (pen.)	Report	McGregor 12'	Stadium: Tynecastle Park; Attendance: 18,774; Referee: Steven McLean

29 October 2025	Celtic	4–0	Falkirk	Glasgow
19:45 GMT	Kenny 30', 40'; Nygren 58'; Tounekti 73'	Report		Stadium: Celtic Park; Attendance: 58,169; Referee: Ryan Lee

9 November 2025	Celtic	4–0	Kilmarnock	Glasgow
16:00 GMT	Kenny 10'; Tierney 51'; Maeda 85'; Engels 90+3' (pen.)	Report		Stadium: Celtic Park; Attendance: 58,088; Referee: Don Robertson

22 November 2025	St Mirren	0–1	Celtic	Paisley
20:00 GMT		Report	McGregor 90+5'	Stadium: St Mirren Park; Attendance: 6,840; Referee: Kevin Clancy

30 November 2025	Hibernian	1–2	Celtic	Edinburgh
12:00 GMT	Boyle 56' (pen.)	Report	Maeda 27'; Engels 28'	Stadium: Easter Road; Attendance: 18,419; Referee: Nick Walsh

3 December 2025	Celtic	1–0	Dundee	Glasgow
19:45 GMT	Maeda 11'	Report		Stadium: Celtic Park; Attendance: 57,302; Referee: Duncan Nicolson

7 December 2025	Celtic	1–2	Heart of Midlothian	Glasgow
15:00 GMT	Tierney 90+3'	Report	Braga 43'; McEntee 64'	Stadium: Celtic Park; Attendance: 58,794; Referee: Don Robertson

17 December 2025	Dundee United	2–1	Celtic	Dundee
20:00 GMT	Keresztes 58'; Sapsford 61'	Report	Maeda 13'	Stadium: Tannadice Park; Attendance: 12,966; Referee: John Beaton

21 December 2025	Celtic	3–1	Aberdeen	Glasgow
15:00 GMT	Nygren 39'; Tierney 88'; Forrest 90+2'	Report	Bilalović 74'	Stadium: Celtic Park; Attendance: 58,798; Referee: David Dickinson

27 December 2025	Livingston	2–4	Celtic	Livingston
15:00 GMT	Montaño 3', 8'	Report	Nygren 6', 31'; Yang 10'; Engels 39' (pen.)	Stadium: Almondvale Stadium; Attendance: 8,861; Referee: Matthew MacDermid

30 December 2025	Motherwell	2–0	Celtic	Motherwell
20:00 GMT	Said 14'; Watt 58'	Report		Stadium: Fir Park; Attendance: 11,435; Referee: Kevin Clancy

3 January 2026	Celtic	1–3	Rangers	Glasgow
12:30 GMT	Yang 20'	Report	Chermiti 50', 59'; Moore 71'	Stadium: Celtic Park; Attendance: 58,673; Referee: Steven McLean

10 January 2026	Celtic	4–0	Dundee United	Glasgow
15:00 GMT	Yang 27'; Engels 32'; Nygren 63'; Maeda 69'	Report		Stadium: Celtic Park; Attendance: 58,477; Referee: Nick Walsh

14 January 2026	Falkirk	0–1	Celtic	Falkirk
19:45 GMT		Report	Nygren 43'	Stadium: Falkirk Stadium; Attendance: 7,730; Referee: John Beaton (first half), Sean Murdoch (second half)

25 January 2026	Heart of Midlothian	2–2	Celtic	Edinburgh
15:00 GMT	Findlay 48'; Braga 87'	Report	Nygren 7'; Yang 62'	Stadium: Tynecastle Park; Attendance: 18,859; Referee: Steven McLean

1 February 2026	Celtic	2–0	Falkirk	Glasgow
15:00 GMT	Čvančara 39'; Nygren 62'	Report		Stadium: Celtic Park; Attendance: 58,450; Referee: David Dickinson

11 February 2026	Celtic	2–1	Livingston	Glasgow
19:45 GMT	Saracchi 15'; Oxlade-Chamberlain 90+1'	Report	Muirhead 57' (pen.)	Stadium: Celtic Park; Attendance: 58,292; Referee: Calum Scott

15 February 2026	Kilmarnock	2–3	Celtic	Kilmarnock
14:00 GMT	John-Jules 21'; Hugill 28'	Report	Tounekti 56'; Nygren 64'; Araujo 90+7'	Stadium: Rugby Park; Attendance: 8,090; Referee: Duncan Nicolson

22 February 2026	Celtic	1–2	Hibernian	Glasgow
15:00 GMT	Nygren 45'	Report	Passlack 24'; Andrews 87'	Stadium: Celtic Park; Attendance: 58,687; Referee: Matthew MacDermid

1 March 2026	Rangers	2–2	Celtic	Glasgow
12:00 GMT	Chermiti 8', 26'	Report	Tierney 56'; Hatate 90+1'	Stadium: Ibrox Stadium; Attendance: 50,129; Referee: John Beaton

4 March 2026	Aberdeen	1–2	Celtic	Aberdeen
20:00 GMT	Nisbet 19' (pen.)	Report	Tierney 5'; Nygren 67'	Stadium: Pittodrie Stadium; Attendance: 17,592; Referee: Nick Walsh

14 March 2026	Celtic	3–1	Motherwell	Glasgow
15:00 GMT	Yang 38', 79'; Čvančara 72' (pen.)	Report	Just 32'	Stadium: Celtic Park; Attendance: 58,904; Referee: John Beaton

22 March 2026	Dundee United	2–0	Celtic	Dundee
12:30 GMT	Ferry 51'; Agyei 66'	Report		Stadium: Tannadice Park; Attendance: 13,228; Referee: Nick Walsh

5 April 2026	Dundee	1–2	Celtic	Dundee
16:30 BST	Murray 57' (pen.)	Report	Yang 8'; Iheanacho 82'	Stadium: Dens Park; Attendance: 9,007; Referee: Steven McLean

11 April 2026	Celtic	1–0	St Mirren	Glasgow
15:00 BST	Oxlade-Chamberlain 15'	Report		Stadium: Celtic Park; Attendance: 58,695; Referee: Duncan Nicolson

25 April 2026	Celtic	3–1	Falkirk	Glasgow
17:30 BST	Maeda 30', 83'; Tierney 44'	Report	Wilson 70'	Stadium: Celtic Park; Attendance: 58,481; Referee: Ryan Lee

3 May 2026	Hibernian	1–2	Celtic	Edinburgh
12:00 BST	Newell 45+3'	Report	Maeda 41'; Iheanacho 72'	Stadium: Easter Road; Attendance: 18,113; Referee: David Dickinson

10 May 2026	Celtic	3–1	Rangers	Glasgow
12:00 BST	Yang 23'; Maeda 53', 57'	Report	Moore 9'	Stadium: Celtic Park; Attendance: 58,714; Referee: Nick Walsh

13 May 2026	Motherwell	2–3	Celtic	Motherwell
20:00 BST	Watt 17'; Gordon 85'	Report	Maeda 41'; Nygren 58'; Iheanacho 90+9' (pen.)	Stadium: Fir Park; Attendance: 12,028; Referee: John Beaton

16 May 2026	Celtic	3–1	Heart of Midlothian	Glasgow
12:30 BST	Engels 45+4' (pen.); Maeda 87'; Osmand 90+8'	Report	Shankland 43'	Stadium: Celtic Park; Attendance: 59,079; Referee: Don Robertson
Note: Celtic fans invaded the pitch after the third goal in the 98th minute, causing confusion over the end of the match. While a statement from Hearts said that "nobody seemed to know" whether it had ended, the SPFL later confirmed that the referee had ended the match and had consulted with the Hearts coach prior to doing so. During the pitch invasion, Hearts players and staff were alleged to have been physically and verbally assaulted; they were escorted out of Celtic Park and unable to fulfil media commitments on personnel safety grounds. Police Scotland later confirmed that they had received no complaints from Hearts regarding the reported allegations.

== Scottish Cup ==
On 30 November, Celtic were drawn to face Auchinleck Talbot in the fourth round of the 2025–26 Scottish Cup. On 18 January 2026, Celtic were drawn to face Dundee at Celtic Park in the fifth round. On 8 February, Celtic were drawn to face Rangers in the quarter-finals. On 8 March, Celtic were drawn to face St Mirren in the semi-finals. Celtic faced Dunfermline Athletic in the final on 23 May.

18 January 2026 Fourth round	Auchinleck Talbot	0–2	Celtic	Kilmarnock
17:30 GMT		Report	Kenny 34'; Tounekti 87'	Stadium: Rugby Park; Attendance: 10,723; Referee: Ross Hardie

7 February 2026 Fifth round	Celtic	2–1 (a.e.t.)	Dundee	Glasgow
17:30 GMT	Adamu 90+7'; Tounekti 92'	Report	Hamilton 49'	Stadium: Celtic Park; Attendance: 36,673; Referee: Ryan Lee

8 March 2026 Quarter-finals	Rangers	0–0 (a.e.t.) (2–4 p)	Celtic	Glasgow
13:00 GMT		Report		Stadium: Ibrox Stadium; Attendance: 51,215; Referee: Don Robertson
	Penalties
	Tavernier (penalty missed); Bajrami (penalty scored); Naderi (penalty scored); Gassama (penalty missed)		(penalty scored) Oxlade-Chamberlain; (penalty scored) Trusty; (penalty scored) Hatate; (penalty scored) Čvančara
Note: At the conclusion of the penalty shootout, there was a violent pitch invasion involving fans from both clubs, resulting in multiple arrests by police.

19 April 2026 Semi-finals	Celtic	6–2 (a.e.t.)	St Mirren	Glasgow
14:00 BST	Maeda 1'; Ralston 45+3'; Iheanacho 96', 100'; McCowan 98'; Nygren 102'	Report	Mandron 53', 90+1'	Stadium: Hampden Park; Attendance: 47,149; Referee: Matthew MacDermid

23 May 2026 Final	Celtic	3–1	Dunfermline Athletic	Glasgow
15:00 BST	Maeda 19'; Engels 36'; Iheanacho 73'	Report	Cooper 80'	Stadium: Hampden Park; Attendance: 49,613; Referee: Steven McLean

== Scottish League Cup ==
On 27 July, Celtic were drawn against Falkirk in the second round of the 2025–26 Scottish League Cup. On 16 August, Celtic were drawn against Partick Thistle in the quarter-finals. On 21 September, Celtic were drawn against Rangers in the semi-finals. Celtic faced St Mirren in the final on 14 December.

15 August 2025 Second round	Celtic	4–1	Falkirk	Glasgow
19:45 BST	Maeda 26'; Johnston 54'; Murray 61'; Henderson 64' (o.g.)	Report	Adams 67'	Stadium: Celtic Park; Attendance: 46,063; Referee: Lloyd Wilson

21 September 2025 Quarter-finals	Partick Thistle	0–4	Celtic	Glasgow
15:30 BST		Report	Yang 26'; Scales 28'; Tounekti 46'; McCowan 79'	Stadium: Firhill Stadium; Attendance: 8,817; Referee: Kevin Clancy

2 November 2025 Semi-finals	Celtic	3–1 (a.e.t.)	Rangers	Glasgow
14:00 GMT	Kenny 25'; McGregor 93'; Osmand 109'	Report	Tavernier 81' (pen.)	Stadium: Hampden Park; Attendance: 49,446; Referee: Nick Walsh

14 December 2025 Final	St Mirren	3–1	Celtic	Glasgow
15:30 GMT	Fraser 2'; Ayunga 64', 76'	Report	Hatate 23'	Stadium: Hampden Park; Attendance: 49,914; Referee: Kevin Clancy

== UEFA Champions League ==
=== Play-off round ===
On 4 August, Celtic were drawn against the winners of the third qualifying round tie between Kairat and Slovan Bratislava, in the UEFA Champions League play-off round. On 12 August, it was determined that Celtic would face Kairat.

20 August 2025 First leg	Celtic (Scotland)	0–0	(Kazakhstan) Kairat	Glasgow
20:00 BST		Report		Stadium: Celtic Park; Attendance: 56,182; Referee: Espen Eskås (Norway)

26 August 2025 Second leg	Kairat (Kazakhstan)	0–0 (a.e.t.) (0–0 agg.) (3–2 p)	(Scotland) Celtic	Almaty, Kazakhstan
21:45 KZT		Report		Stadium: Almaty Central Stadium; Attendance: 22,800; Referee: Maurizio Mariani (Italy)
	Penalties
	Gromyko (penalty missed); Martynovich (penalty scored); Arad (penalty scored); Sorokin (penalty scored)		(penalty missed) Idah; (penalty missed) McCowan; (penalty scored) Engels; (penalty scored) McGregor; (penalty missed) Maeda

== UEFA Europa League ==
Celtic entered the UEFA Europa League at the league phase.

=== League phase ===
On 29 August, the draw for the league phase was made. Celtic were drawn with Roma and Feyenoord (Pot 1), Braga and Red Star Belgrade (Pot 2), Sturm Graz and Midtjylland (Pot 3), and Utrecht and Bologna (Pot 4).

Pos	Team	Pld	W	D	L	GF	GA	GD	Pts	Qualification
19	(Turkish Football Federation) Fenerbahçe	8	3	3	2	10	7	+3	12	Advance to knockout phase play-offs (unseeded)
20	(Hellenic Football Federation) Panathinaikos	8	3	3	2	11	9	+2	12	Advance to knockout phase play-offs (unseeded)
21	(Scottish Football Association) Celtic	8	3	2	3	13	15	−2	11	Advance to knockout phase play-offs (unseeded)
22	(Bulgarian Football Union) Ludogorets Razgrad	8	3	1	4	12	15	−3	10	Advance to knockout phase play-offs (unseeded)
23	(Croatian Football Federation) Dinamo Zagreb	8	3	1	4	12	16	−4	10	Advance to knockout phase play-offs (unseeded)

Source: UEFA
Rules for classification: League phase tiebreakers

==== Matches ====
24 September 2025 Matchday 1	Red Star Belgrade (Serbia)	1–1	(Scotland) Celtic	Belgrade, Serbia
21:00 CEST	Arnautović 65'	Report	Iheanacho 55'	Stadium: Red Star Stadium; Attendance: 35,721; Referee: Radu Petrescu (Romania)

2 October 2025 Matchday 2	Celtic (Scotland)	0–2	(Portugal) Braga	Glasgow
17:45 BST		Report	Horta 20'; Martínez 85'	Stadium: Celtic Park; Attendance: 46,232; Referee: Tobias Stieler (Germany)

23 October 2025 Matchday 3	Celtic (Scotland)	2–1	(Austria) Sturm Graz	Glasgow
20:00 BST	Scales 61'; Nygren 64'	Report	Horvat 15'	Stadium: Celtic Park; Attendance: 48,278; Referee: Juan Martínez Munuera (Spain)

6 November 2025 Matchday 4	Midtjylland (Denmark)	3–1	(Scotland) Celtic	Herning, Denmark
18:45 CET	Erlić 33'; Gogorza 35'; Djú 41'	Report	Hatate 81' (pen.)	Stadium: MCH Arena; Attendance: 10,387; Referee: Nenad Minaković (Serbia)

27 November 2025 Matchday 5	Feyenoord (Netherlands)	1–3	(Scotland) Celtic	Rotterdam, Netherlands
18:45 CET	Ueda 11'	Report	Yang 31'; Hatate 43'; Nygren 82'	Stadium: De Kuip; Attendance: 31,582; Referee: Sebastian Gishamer (Austria)

11 December 2025 Matchday 6	Celtic (Scotland)	0–3	(Italy) Roma	Glasgow
20:00 GMT		Report	Scales 6' (o.g.); Ferguson 36', 45+1'	Stadium: Celtic Park; Attendance: 56,188; Referee: István Kovács (Romania)

22 January 2026 Matchday 7	Bologna (Italy)	2–2	(Scotland) Celtic	Bologna, Italy
18:45 CET	Dallinga 58'; Rowe 72'	Report	Hatate 6'; Trusty 40'	Stadium: Stadio Renato Dall'Ara; Attendance: 23,791; Referee: Vassilis Fotias (Greece)

29 January 2026 Matchday 8	Celtic (Scotland)	4–2	(Netherlands) Utrecht	Glasgow
20:00 GMT	Nygren 6'; Viergever 10' (o.g.); Engels 19' (pen.); Trusty 66'	Report	de Wit 44'; Blake 62'	Stadium: Celtic Park; Attendance: 55,559; Referee: Mohammad Al-Emara (Finland)

=== Knockout phase play-offs ===
The draw for the knockout phase play-offs was held on 30 January 2026. Celtic were drawn against VfB Stuttgart, as a result of finishing the league phase in 21st place.

==== Matches ====
19 February 2026 First leg	Celtic (Scotland)	1–4	(Germany) VfB Stuttgart	Glasgow
20:00 GMT	Nygren 21'	Report	El Khannouss 15', 28'; Leweling 57'; Tomás 90+3'	Stadium: Celtic Park; Attendance: 52,901; Referee: Erik Lambrechts (Belgium)

26 February 2026 Second leg	VfB Stuttgart (Germany)	0–1 (4–2 agg.)	(Scotland) Celtic	Stuttgart, Germany
18:45 CET		Report	McCowan 1'	Stadium: MHPArena; Attendance: 58,500; Referee: Irfan Peljto (Bosnia and Herzegovina)

== Statistics ==
=== Appearances and goals ===
No.	Pos	Nat	Player	Total		Premiership		Scottish Cup		League Cup		Champions League		Europa League	
No.	Pos	Nat	Player	Apps	Goals	Apps	Goals	Apps	Goals	Apps	Goals	Apps	Goals	Apps	Goals
Goalkeepers
1	GK	(Denmark) DEN	Kasper Schmeichel	39	0	26	0	0	0	2	0	2	0	9	0
12	GK	(Finland) FIN	Viljami Sinisalo	20	0	12	0	5	0	2	0	0	0	1	0
31	GK	(Scotland) SCO	Ross Doohan	0	0	0	0	0	0	0	0	0	0	0	0
Defenders
2	DF	(Canada) CAN	Alistair Johnston	11	1	7	0	1	0	1	1	1	0	1	0
5	DF	(Republic of Ireland) IRL	Liam Scales	56	2	37	0	4	0	4	1	2	0	9	1
6	DF	(United States) USA	Auston Trusty	41	2	26	0	4	0	3	0	1	0	7	2
20	DF	(United States) USA	Cameron Carter-Vickers	13	0	7	0	0	0	1	0	2	0	3	0
22	DF	(Mexico) MEX	Julián Araujo	13	1	10	1	2	0	0	0	0	0	1	0
36	DF	(Uruguay) URU	Marcelo Saracchi	27	1	19	1	3	0	1	0	0	0	4	0
37	DF	(Scotland) SCO	Adam Montgomery	0	0	0	0	0	0	0	0	0	0	0	0
43	DF	(England) ENG	Benjamin Arthur	6	0	4	0	2	0	0	0	0	0	0	0
47	DF	(Scotland) SCO	Dane Murray	16	1	7	0	3	0	1	1	1	0	4	0
51	DF	(Scotland) SCO	Colby Donovan	27	0	14	0	2	0	2	0	1	0	8	0
56	DF	(Scotland) SCO	Anthony Ralston	35	1	24	0	2	1	2	0	2	0	5	0
63	DF	(Scotland) SCO	Kieran Tierney	53	6	35	6	3	0	4	0	2	0	9	0
Midfielders
8	MF	(Sweden) SWE	Benjamin Nygren	58	21	38	16	5	1	3	0	2	0	10	4
14	MF	(Scotland) SCO	Luke McCowan	42	4	30	1	4	1	3	1	1	0	4	1
21	MF	(England) ENG	Alex Oxlade-Chamberlain	12	2	9	2	3	0	0	0	0	0	0	0
27	MF	(Belgium) BEL	Arne Engels	46	7	30	5	2	1	4	0	2	0	8	1
28	MF	(Portugal) POR	Paulo Bernardo	20	0	8	0	3	0	2	0	0	0	7	0
41	MF	(Japan) JPN	Reo Hatate	47	6	30	2	3	0	3	1	2	0	9	3
42	MF	(Scotland) SCO	Callum McGregor (captain)	57	3	37	2	4	0	4	1	2	0	10	0
Forwards
7	FW	(Portugal) POR	Jota	0	0	0	0	0	0	0	0	0	0	0	0
9	FW	(Austria) AUT	Junior Adamu	6	1	4	0	1	1	0	0	0	0	1	0
10	FW	(Democratic Republic of the Congo) COD	Michel-Ange Balikwisha	14	0	7	0	1	0	2	0	0	0	4	0
11	FW	(Czech Republic) CZE	Tomáš Čvančara	13	2	9	2	2	0	0	0	0	0	2	0
13	FW	(South Korea) KOR	Yang Hyun-jun	47	10	31	8	4	0	3	1	2	0	7	1
17	FW	(Nigeria) NGR	Kelechi Iheanacho	24	9	13	5	2	3	2	0	0	0	7	1
19	FW	(England) ENG	Callum Osmand	4	2	2	1	0	0	1	1	0	0	1	0
23	FW	(Tunisia) TUN	Sebastian Tounekti	45	5	27	2	5	2	3	1	0	0	10	0
32	FW	(Norway) NOR	Joel Mvuka	2	0	0	0	2	0	0	0	0	0	0	0
38	FW	(Japan) JPN	Daizen Maeda	54	17	36	14	3	2	4	1	2	0	9	0
49	FW	(Scotland) SCO	James Forrest	41	1	27	1	5	0	3	0	2	0	4	0
Departures
4	DF	(England) ENG	Jahmai Simpson-Pusey	1	0	1	0	0	0	0	0	0	0	0	0
9	FW	(Republic of Ireland) IRL	Adam Idah	4	0	2	0	0	0	0	0	2	0	0	0
18	FW	(Japan) JPN	Shin Yamada	11	0	8	0	1	0	1	0	1	0	0	0
24	FW	(Republic of Ireland) IRL	Johnny Kenny	22	6	15	4	1	1	3	1	0	0	3	0
25	DF	(Japan) JPN	Hayato Inamura	1	0	1	0	0	0	0	0	0	0	0	0
57	DF	(Scotland) SCO	Stephen Welsh	2	0	1	0	1	0	0	0	0	0	0	0

Last updated: 23 May 2026
Source: Competitions

Notes

1. Player's loan ended during the season
2. Player loaned out during the season
3. Player left the club during the season

=== Goalscorers ===
R	No.	Pos.	Nation	Name	Premiership	Scottish Cup	League Cup	Champions League	Europa League	Total
1	8	MF	(Sweden)	Benjamin Nygren	16	1	0	0	4	21
2	38	FW	(Japan)	Daizen Maeda	14	2	1	0	0	17
3	13	FW	(South Korea)	Yang Hyun-jun	8	0	1	0	1	10
4	17	FW	(Nigeria)	Kelechi Iheanacho	5	3	0	0	1	9
5	27	MF	(Belgium)	Arne Engels	5	1	0	0	1	7
6	24	FW	(Republic of Ireland)	Johnny Kenny	4	1	1	0	0	6
6	41	MF	(Japan)	Reo Hatate	2	0	1	0	3	6
6	63	DF	(Scotland)	Kieran Tierney	6	0	0	0	0	6
9	23	FW	(Tunisia)	Sebastian Tounekti	2	2	1	0	0	5
10	14	MF	(Scotland)	Luke McCowan	1	1	1	0	1	4
11	42	MF	(Scotland)	Callum McGregor	2	0	1	0	0	3
12	5	DF	(Republic of Ireland)	Liam Scales	0	0	1	0	1	2
12	6	DF	(United States)	Auston Trusty	0	0	0	0	2	2
12	11	FW	(Czech Republic)	Tomáš Čvančara	2	0	0	0	0	2
12	19	FW	(England)	Callum Osmand	1	0	1	0	0	2
12	21	MF	(England)	Alex Oxlade-Chamberlain	2	0	0	0	0	2
17	2	DF	(Canada)	Alistair Johnston	0	0	1	0	0	1
17	9	FW	(Austria)	Junior Adamu	0	1	0	0	0	1
17	22	DF	(Mexico)	Julián Araujo	1	0	0	0	0	1
17	36	DF	(Uruguay)	Marcelo Saracchi	1	0	0	0	0	1
17	47	DF	(Scotland)	Dane Murray	0	0	1	0	0	1
17	49	FW	(Scotland)	James Forrest	1	0	0	0	0	1
17	56	DF	(Scotland)	Anthony Ralston	0	1	0	0	0	1
Own goals					0	0	1	0	1	2
Total					73	13	12	0	15	113

Last updated: 23 May 2026

=== Disciplinary record ===
Includes all competitive matches. Players listed below made at least one appearance for Celtic first squad during the season.

N	P	Nat.	Name	Premiership			Scottish Cup			League Cup			Champions League			Europa League			Total			Notes
N	P	Nat.	Name	Yellow card	Second yellow card	Red card	Yellow card	Second yellow card	Red card	Yellow card	Second yellow card	Red card	Yellow card	Second yellow card	Red card	Yellow card	Second yellow card	Red card	Yellow card	Second yellow card	Red card	Notes
6	DF	(United States)	Auston Trusty	4		2	1			2									7		2	
41	MF	(Japan)	Reo Hatate	5			1						1			1	1		8	1		
5	DF	(Republic of Ireland)	Liam Scales	12			2			1						2			17			
42	MF	(Scotland)	Callum McGregor	9						1			1			1			12			
27	MF	(Belgium)	Arne Engels	6			1			1						2			10			
38	FW	(Japan)	Daizen Maeda	6						1						2			9			
22	DF	(Mexico)	Julián Araujo	3			2												5			
56	DF	(Scotland)	Anthony Ralston	4						1									5			
8	MF	(Sweden)	Benjamin Nygren	4															4			
51	DF	(Scotland)	Colby Donovan	2			1									1			4			
1	GK	(Denmark)	Kasper Schmeichel	3															3			
14	MF	(Scotland)	Luke McCowan	2			1												3			
17	FW	(Nigeria)	Kelechi Iheanacho	2												1			3			
23	FW	(Tunisia)	Sebastian Tounekti	3															3			
28	MF	(Portugal)	Paulo Bernardo	1			1									1			3			
36	DF	(Uruguay)	Marcelo Saracchi	1												2			3			
63	DF	(Scotland)	Kieran Tierney	2									1						3			
2	DF	(Canada)	Alistair Johnston	2															2			
11	FW	(Czech Republic)	Tomáš Čvančara	2															2			
13	FW	(South Korea)	Yang Hyun-jun	1												1			2			
20	DF	(United States)	Cameron Carter-Vickers	1												1			2			
49	FW	(Scotland)	James Forrest	1			1												2			
9	FW	(Republic of Ireland)	Adam Idah	1															1			
19	FW	(England)	Callum Osmand							1									1			
21	MF	(England)	Alex Oxlade-Chamberlain	1															1			

Last updated: 23 May 2026
Source: Competitive matches
Only competitive matches
(yellow card) = Number of bookings; (second yellow card) = Number of sending offs after a second yellow card; (red card) = Number of sending offs by a direct red card.

=== Clean sheets ===
As of 23 May 2026.

Rank	Name	Premiership	Scottish Cup	League Cup	Champions League	Europa League	Total	Played Games
1	(Denmark) Kasper Schmeichel	12	0	0	2	0	14	39
2	(Finland) Viljami Sinisalo	1	2	1	0	1	5	20
Total		13	2	1	2	1	19	59

=== Attendances ===
As of match played 16 May 2026

	Matches	Attendances	Average	High	Low
Premiership	19	1,112,508	58,553	59,079	57,302
Scottish Cup	1	36,673	36,673	36,673	N/A
League Cup	1	46,063	46,063	46,063	N/A
Champions League	1	56,182	56,182	56,182	N/A
Europa League	5	259,158	51,831	56,188	46,232
Total	27	1,510,584	55,947	59,079	36,673

== Team statistics ==
=== League table ===
Pos	Team	Pld	W	D	L	GF	GA	GD	Pts	Qualification or relegation (Note: Teams played each other three times (33 matches), before the league was split into two groups (the top six and the bottom six).)
1	Celtic (C)	38	26	4	8	73	41	+32	82	Qualification for the Champions League play-off round
2	Heart of Midlothian	38	24	8	6	67	34	+33	80	Qualification for the Champions League second qualifying round
3	Rangers	38	20	12	6	76	43	+33	72	Qualification for the Europa League third qualifying round (Note: Since the 2025–26 Scottish Cup winners, Celtic, qualified for the Champions League via league position, the spot reserved for the cup winners (Europa League third qualifying round) was passed to the third-placed team, and the spots for the Conference League second qualifying round were moved down one league position.)
4	Motherwell	38	16	13	9	59	36	+23	61	Qualification for the Conference League second qualifying round
5	Hibernian	38	15	12	11	58	44	+14	57	Qualification for the Conference League second qualifying round

Rules for classification: 1) Points; 2) Goal difference; 3) Goals scored; 4) Head-to-head points; 5) Head-to-head goal difference; 6) Play-off (only if deciding champion, UEFA competition qualification, second stage group allocation, or relegation).
(C) Champions

=== Competition overview ===
Competition	First match	Last match	Starting round	Final position	Record							
Competition	First match	Last match	Starting round	Final position	Pld	W	D	L	GF	GA	GD	Win %
Premiership	3 August 2025	16 May 2026	Round 1	Winners	38	26	4	8	73	41	+32	68.42
Scottish Cup	18 January 2026	23 May 2026	Fourth round	Winners	5	4	1	0	13	4	+9	80.00
League Cup	15 August 2025	14 December 2025	Second round	Runners-up	4	3	0	1	12	5	+7	75.00
Champions League	20 August 2025	26 August 2025	Play-off round	Play-off round	2	0	2	0	0	0	+0	0.00
Europa League	24 September 2025	26 February 2026	League phase	Knockout phase play-offs	10	4	2	4	15	19	−4	40.00
Total					59	37	9	13	113	69	+44	62.71

Source: Soccerway

== Club ==
=== Management ===
Position	Name
Manager	(Northern Ireland) Brendan Rodgers (until 27 October 2025) (Northern Ireland) Martin O'Neill (interim from 27 October 2025 until 4 December 2025; permanent from 5 January 2026) (France) Wilfried Nancy (from 4 December 2025 until 5 January 2026)
Assistant managers	(Scotland) John Kennedy (until 29 October 2025) (Scotland) Shaun Maloney (interim from 27 October 2025 until 4 December 2025; permanent from 5 January 2026) (Scotland) Mark Fotheringham (interim from 29 October 2025 until 4 December 2025; permanent from 5 January 2026) (Republic of Ireland) Kwame Ampadu (from 4 December 2025 until 5 January 2026) (France) Jules Gueguen (from 4 December 2025 until 5 January 2026)
First team coaches	(England) Adam Sadler (until 29 October 2025) (Scotland) Gavin Strachan (Scotland) Stephen McManus (interim from 29 October 2025 until 4 December 2025; permanent from 5 January 2026)
Goalkeeping coach	(Scotland) Stevie Woods
Head of performance	(England) Glen Driscoll (until 29 October 2025)
Performance analyst	(Scotland) Jack Lyons (until 29 October 2025) (Scotland) Greg Wallace (France) Maxime Chalier (from 4 December 2025 until 5 January 2026)

=== Kit ===
Supplier: Adidas / Sponsors: Dafabet

The club is in the first year of a new deal with Adidas – the club's official kit supplier since 2020.

Home	Away	Third

- Home: The home kit features a tartan pattern within the traditional green and white hoops, and a dark green trim. White shorts and socks complete the look.
- Away: The away kit features a black shirt with a neon green trim and horizontal pinstripes. The shirt is accompanied by black shorts and socks.
- Third: The third kit features an off white shirt with an orange trim, pale green hoops and an embroidered four-leaf clover. The shirt is accompanied by pale green shorts and matching socks.

== Transfers ==
=== In ===
Pos	Player	From	Type	Window	Fee
DF	(Scotland) Kieran Tierney	(England) Arsenal	Transfer	Summer	Free
DF	(Scotland) Isaac English	(Scotland) Greenock Morton	Transfer	Summer	Undisclosed
GK	(Scotland) Ross Doohan	(Scotland) Aberdeen	Transfer	Summer	Free
MF	(Sweden) Benjamin Nygren	(Denmark) Nordsjælland	Transfer	Summer	Undisclosed
FW	(England) Callum Osmand	(England) Fulham	Transfer	Summer	Compensation
DF	(Japan) Hayato Inamura	(Japan) Albirex Niigata	Transfer	Summer	Undisclosed
FW	(Japan) Shin Yamada	(Japan) Kawasaki Frontale	Transfer	Summer	Undisclosed
DF	(England) Jahmai Simpson-Pusey	(England) Manchester City	Loan	Summer	Loan
FW	(Democratic Republic of the Congo) Michel-Ange Balikwisha	(Belgium) Royal Antwerp	Transfer	Summer	Undisclosed
DF	(Uruguay) Marcelo Saracchi	(Argentina) Boca Juniors	Loan	Summer	Loan
FW	(Tunisia) Sebastian Tounekti	(Sweden) Hammarby	Transfer	Summer	Undisclosed
FW	(Nigeria) Kelechi Iheanacho	(Spain) Sevilla	Transfer	Summer	Free
DF	(Mexico) Julián Araujo	(England) Bournemouth	Loan	Winter	Loan
FW	(Czech Republic) Tomáš Čvančara	(Germany) Borussia Mönchengladbach	Loan	Winter	Loan
FW	(Austria) Junior Adamu	(Germany) SC Freiburg	Loan	Winter	Loan
DF	(England) Benjamin Arthur	(England) Brentford	Loan	Winter	Loan
FW	(Norway) Joel Mvuka	(France) Lorient	Loan	Winter	Loan
MF	(England) Alex Oxlade-Chamberlain	Unattached	Transfer	Winter	Free

=== Out ===
Pos	Player	To	Type	Window	Fee
GK	(Scotland) Scott Bain	(Scotland) Falkirk	Transfer	Summer	Free
FW	(England) Joey Dawson	(England) Scunthorpe United	Transfer	Summer	Free
DF	(Scotland) Matthew Anderson	(Belgium) Kortrijk	Transfer	Summer	Undisclosed
DF	(Scotland) Greg Taylor	(Greece) PAOK	Transfer	Summer	Free
FW	(Scotland) Daniel Cummings	(England) West Ham United	Transfer	Summer	Compensation
DF	(Poland) Maik Nawrocki	(Germany) Hannover 96	Loan	Summer	Loan
DF	(Sweden) Gustaf Lagerbielke	(Portugal) Braga	Transfer	Summer	Undisclosed
DF	(Australia) Liam Bonetig	(Australia) Melbourne City	Transfer	Summer	Undisclosed
FW	(Germany) Nicolas Kühn	(Italy) Como	Transfer	Summer	Undisclosed
DF	(Scotland) Alasdair Davidson	(Scotland) Dunfermline Athletic	Transfer	Summer	Free
DF	(Scotland) Lenny Agbaire	(England) Rotherham United	Transfer	Summer	Undisclosed
GK	(Scotland) Joe Morrison	(Scotland) East Kilbride	Transfer	Summer	Free
MF	(Scotland) Jude Bonnar	(Scotland) Ayr United	Loan	Summer	Loan
FW	(Honduras) Luis Palma	(Poland) Lech Poznań	Loan	Summer	Loan
FW	(Scotland) Lewis Dobbie	(Scotland) East Kilbride	Transfer	Summer	Free
DF	(Scotland) Adam Montgomery	(Scotland) Livingston	Loan	Summer	Loan
MF	(South Korea) Kwon Hyeok-kyu	(France) Nantes	Transfer	Summer	Undisclosed
GK	(Northern Ireland) Josh Clarke	(Scotland) Partick Thistle	Loan	Summer	Loan
MF	(Scotland) Kyle Ure	(Scotland) Ayr United	Loan	Summer	Loan
DF	(Scotland) Mitchell Robertson	(Scotland) Inverness Caledonian Thistle	Loan	Summer	Loan
MF	(Republic of Ireland) Aidan Cannon	(Scotland) Stirling Albion	Transfer	Summer	Free
DF	(Scotland) Ben McPherson	(Scotland) Partick Thistle	Loan	Summer	Loan
FW	(Australia) Marco Tilio	(Austria) Rapid Wien	Transfer	Summer	Undisclosed
MF	(Scotland) Corey Thomson	(Scotland) Stirling Albion	Transfer	Summer	Free
DF	(Scotland) Mitchel Frame	(Scotland) Aberdeen	Transfer	Summer	Undisclosed
FW	(Republic of Ireland) Adam Idah	(Wales) Swansea City	Transfer	Summer	Undisclosed
DF	(Scotland) Stephen Welsh	(Scotland) Motherwell	Loan	Summer	Loan
DF	(Scotland) Aodhan Taylor	(Scotland) East Stirlingshire	Loan	Summer	Loan
MF	(Scotland) Sean McArdle	(Scotland) Partick Thistle	Loan	Summer	Loan
GK	(England) Tobi Oluwayemi	(Scotland) Kilmarnock	Emergency Loan		
DF	(Japan) Hayato Inamura	(Japan) FC Tokyo	Loan	Winter	Loan
MF	(Scotland) Ben Summers	(Scotland) Ayr United	Loan	Winter	Loan
DF	(Scotland) Mitchell Robertson	(Scotland) Livingston	Transfer	Winter	Undisclosed
FW	(Japan) Shin Yamada	(Germany) Preußen Münster	Loan	Winter	Loan
DF	(Scotland) Andrew Kyle	(Scotland) East Kilbride	Loan	Winter	Loan
FW	(Republic of Ireland) Johnny Kenny	(England) Bolton Wanderers	Loan	Winter	Loan
GK	(England) Tobi Oluwayemi	(England) Leyton Orient	Transfer	Winter	Undisclosed
DF	(Scotland) Stephen Welsh	(Scotland) Motherwell	Loan	Winter	Loan
MF	(Northern Ireland) Francis Turley	(Scotland) Ayr United	Loan	Winter	Loan
GK	(Scotland) Aidan Rice	(Scotland) Dumbarton	Loan	Winter	Loan
MF	(Norway) Odin Thiago Holm	(Norway) Vålerenga	Loan	Winter	Loan

== See also ==
- List of Celtic F.C. seasons
