= Liam Scales =

Irish footballer (born 1998)

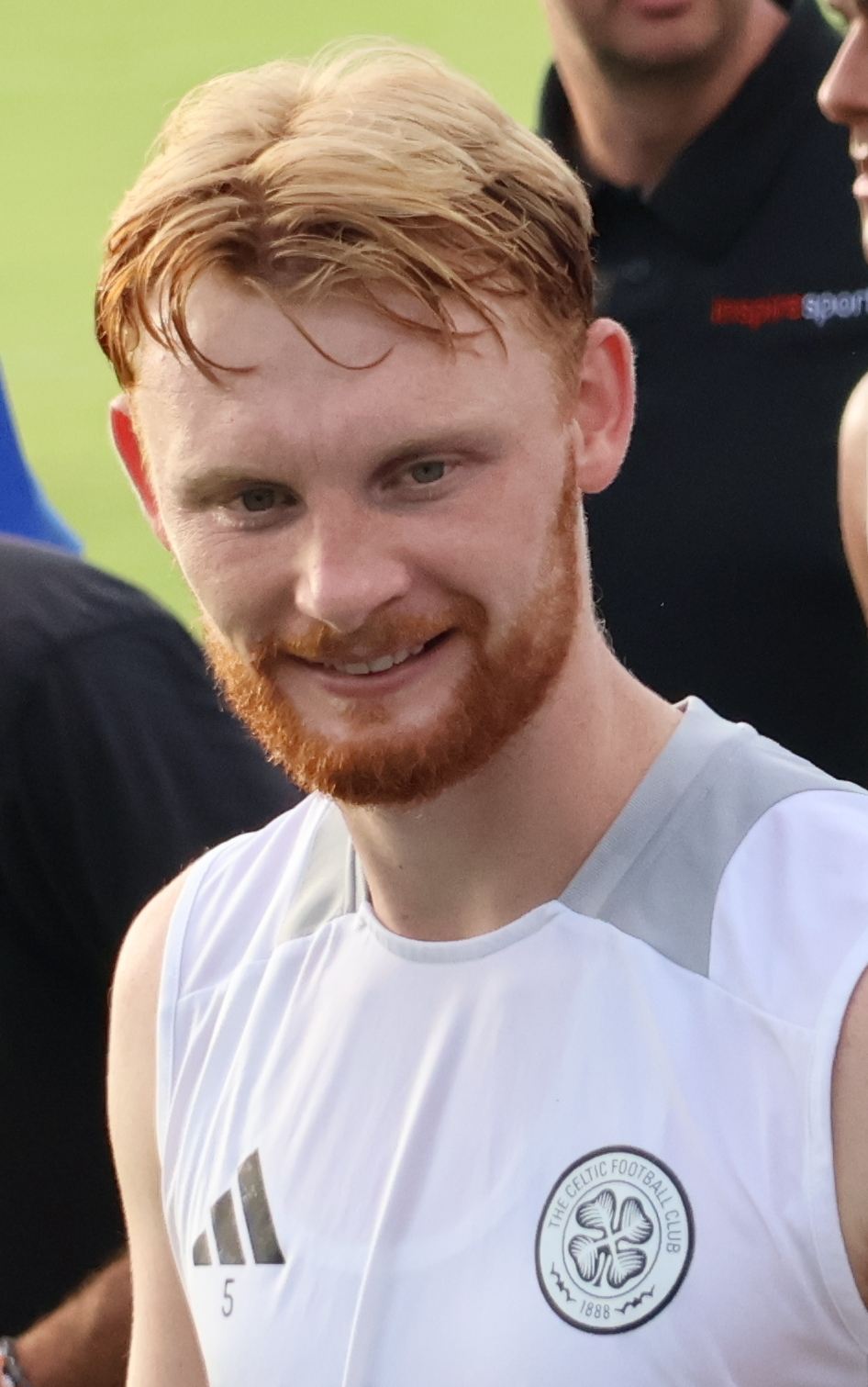
- Scales training with Celtic in 2024

Personal information
- Date of birth: 8 August 1998 (age 28)
- Place of birth: Wicklow, Ireland
- Height: 6 ft 2 in (1.88 m)
- Positions: Centre-back; left-back

Team information
- Current team: Celtic
- Number: 5

Youth career
- Arklow Town
- 2015: UCD

Senior career*
Years	Team	Apps	(Gls)
2016–2019	UCD	93	(7)
2020–2021	Shamrock Rovers	39	(2)
2020	Shamrock Rovers II	1	(1)
2021–	Celtic	114	(7)
2022–2023	→ Aberdeen (loan)	31	(1)

International career^{‡}
2019–2020	Republic of Ireland U21	6	(0)
2023–	Republic of Ireland	21	(1)
- * Club domestic league appearances and goals as of 08:39, 22 November 2026 (UTC) ‡ National team caps and goals as of 21:47, 17 November 2026 (UTC)

Liam Scales (born 8 August 1998) is an Irish professional footballer who plays as a centre-back or a left-back for Scottish Premiership club Celtic and the Republic of Ireland national team.

== Personal life ==
Born in Wicklow, Scales is from Barndarrig, County Wicklow. His father is from London. He studied Irish and geography at University College Dublin. He is a fluent Irish speaker. Scales is close friends with fellow professional footballer Daire O'Connor, with the pair growing up together since the age of 5 and playing together at UCD, before Scales was O'Connor's best man at his wedding.

== Club career ==
=== Early career ===
Scales began his career with Arklow Town before signing for UCD in 2015. He made his League of Ireland debut on 8 July 2016 and made over 100 appearances for the club, winning the Collingwood Cup as well as the League of Ireland First Division title in 2018. He was described as "a key player for UCD as they won the First Division title". Scales was voted by his fellow League of Ireland First Division players into the PFAI First Division Team of the Year for 2018.

In 2019 he underwent trials at English clubs Manchester City and Bristol Rovers, with him seeming to be set to sign for the latter before the deal fell through.

=== Shamrock Rovers ===
He moved to Shamrock Rovers for the 2020 season, and "played a significant part in their league success". He also made seven appearances for the club in European competitions, scoring once, and getting sent off on his European debut. In July 2021 he was described as "the hottest property in the League of Ireland" and linked with a transfer away from the club. On 26 November 2021, he was named in the PFAI Team of the Year for 2021, as voted by his fellow players.

=== Celtic ===
After 51 appearances for Shamrock Rovers, Scales signed a four-year contract with Scottish club Celtic in August 2021. On 23 September 2021, he made his debut for Celtic in a 3–0 win over Raith Rovers in the Scottish League Cup at Celtic Park. Scales made his league debut on 5 December 2021, coming on as a substitute to score the third goal in Celtic's 3–0 away win at Dundee United. On 24 February 2022, Scales started in a 2–0 away defeat against Eliteserien side Bodø/Glimt in the UEFA Europa Conference League.

==== Aberdeen (loan) ====
Scales went to Aberdeen for a season-long loan in June 2022. This transfer caused controversy amongst a section of the Aberdeen support, who launched criticism at their board for continuing to sign players on loan from Celtic. Aberdeen manager Jim Goodwin defended his signature, with him stating that: "I'm a big fan of the loan market as it gives you the opportunity to sign players that you would maybe not normally be able to afford. The size of club we are we want to be signing players on permanent contracts. That conversation was had with Celtic initially. We wanted to know what the number was and could we make it happen. Celtic are not willing to sell Liam at this moment".

On 10 July 2022, Scales made his Aberdeen debut in a 2–0 Scottish League Cup win at Peterhead. On 17 September 2022, Scales was sent off in 3–1 defeat at Hibernian after he was shown a second yellow card by referee David Dickinson. Four months later he was shown red again in a 6–0 loss against the same opposition, a result that saw manager Jim Goodwin removed from his position shortly after the match. Scales first goal for Aberdeen was in a 2–0 win over Rangers.

==== Return to Celtic ====
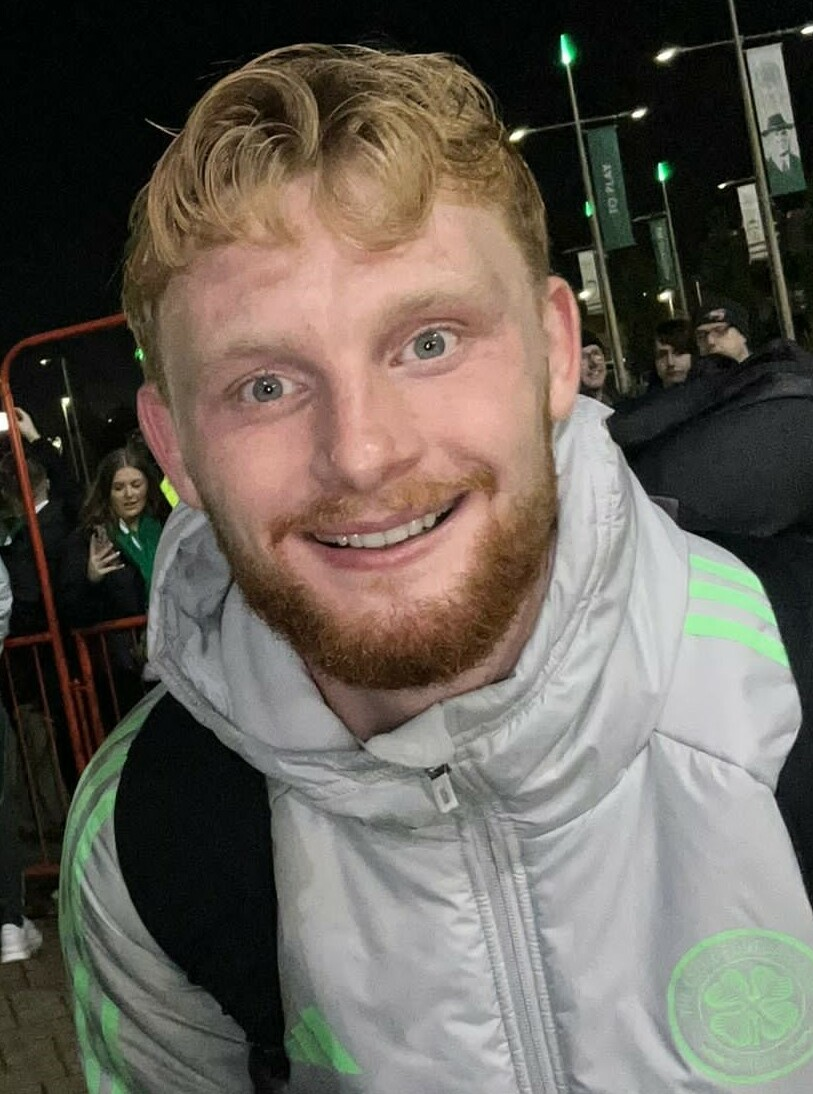
Scales in 2023.

Scales was linked with a return to Aberdeen ahead of the 2023–24 season, but became a Celtic first-team player following injuries to other players. He became a regular player for Celtic following his return to the club in the 2023–24 season, and signed a new four-year contract in May 2024. He was named in the 2023–24 PFA Scotland Scottish Premiership Team of the Year for his performances throughout the season. He scored 3 goals in 40 appearances in all competitions in the 2024–25 season as his side won the Scottish League Cup and retained their Scottish Premiership title for the fourth year in a row.

== International career ==
Scales was a Republic of Ireland under-21 international, winning six caps.

He was called up to the Republic of Ireland senior team for the first time on 3 September 2021 alongside Alan Browne and Callum Robinson for the games against Azerbaijan and Serbia, with the trio replacing the injured Dara O'Shea, Nathan Collins and Shane Long. On 19 September 2022, Scales was called up again for UEFA Nations League group matches against Scotland and Armenia after Andrew Omobamidele was ruled out due a groin injury.

He was recalled by Ireland in October 2023. On 13 October 2023, he made his senior international debut for the Republic of Ireland in a 2–0 defeat at against Greece at the Aviva Stadium.

Republic of Ireland manager Stephen Kenny revealed on 7 November 2023 that Scales would be called up again as part of the squad to play against The Netherlands and New Zealand.

On 10 October 2024, Scales scored his first goal for the Republic of Ireland, an equalising header against Finland, in a match that ended in a 2–1 win to the Republic of Ireland.

On 16 November 2025, Scales provided the headed assist for the third Republic of Ireland goal against Hungary, which was scored by Troy Parrott in second-half added time. The match ended in a 3–2 win to the Republic of Ireland and they advanced to the playoff stage of their 2026 FIFA World Cup qualifying campaign.

== Career statistics ==
As of match played 21 November 2026

Appearances and goals by club, season and competition
Club	Season	League			National cup (Note: Includes FAI Cup, Scottish Cup)		League cup (Note: Includes League of Ireland Cup, Scottish League Cup)		Europe		Other		Total	
Club	Season	Division	Apps	Goals	Apps	Goals	Apps	Goals	Apps	Goals	Apps	Goals	Apps	Goals
UCD	2016	LOI First Division	13	2	2	1	0	0	—		0	0	15	3
UCD	2017	LOI First Division	24	1	1	0	1	0	—		2 (Note: Appearances in the Leinster Senior Cup.)	0	28	1
UCD	2018	LOI First Division	26	3	3	0	2	0	—		0	0	31	3
UCD	2019	LOI Premier Division	30	1	2	0	2	0	—		2	0	36	1
UCD	Total		93	7	8	1	5	0	0	0	4	0	110	8
Shamrock Rovers	2020	LOI Premier Division	16	0	3	0	—		1 (Note: Appearance in the UEFA Europa League.)	0	—		20	0
Shamrock Rovers	2021	LOI Premier Division	23	2	1	0	—		6 (Note: Two appearances in the UEFA Champions League; four appearances and one goal in the UEFA Europa Conference League)	1	1 (Note: Appearances in the President of Ireland's Cup)	1	31	4
Shamrock Rovers	Total		39	2	4	0	0	0	7	1	1	1	51	4
Shamrock Rovers II	2020	LOI First Division	1	1	—		—		—		—		1	1
Celtic	2021–22	Scottish Premiership	5	1	2	1	2	0	4 (Note: Three appearances in the UEFA Europa League and one appearance in the UEFA Europa Conference League)	0	—		13	2
Celtic	2022–23	Scottish Premiership	0	0	—		—		—		—		0	0
Celtic	2023–24	Scottish Premiership	34	1	5	0	0	0	6 (Note: Appearances in the UEFA Champions League)	0	—		45	1
Celtic	2024–25	Scottish Premiership	26	2	4	0	3	0	6	1	—		39	3
Celtic	2025–26	Scottish Premiership	37	0	4	0	4	1	11 (Note: Two appearances in UEFA Champions League, nine appearances and one goal in UEFA Europa League)	1	—		56	2
Celtic	2026–27	Scottish Premiership	12	3	0	0	2	0	4 (Note: One appearance in UEFA Champions League, three appearances in UEFA Europa League)	0	—		18	3
Celtic	Total		114	7	15	1	11	1	31	2	0	0	171	11
Aberdeen (loan)	2022–23	Scottish Premiership	31	1	1	0	7	0	—		—		39	1
Career total			278	18	29	2	23	1	38	3	5	1	372	25

=== International ===
As of match played 17 November 2026

Appearances and goals by national team and year
National team	Year	Apps	Goals
Republic of Ireland	2023	3	0
Republic of Ireland	2024	6	1
Republic of Ireland	2025	4	0
Republic of Ireland	2026	8	0
Total		21	1

Scores and results list the Republic of Ireland's goal tally first.

List of international goals scored by Liam Scales
No.	Date	Venue	Opponent	Score	Result	Competition
1	10 October 2024	Helsinki Olympic Stadium, Helsinki, Finland	Finland	1–1	2–1	2024–25 UEFA Nations League B

== Honours ==
UCD

- League of Ireland First Division: 2018
- Collingwood Cup: 2018

Shamrock Rovers

- League of Ireland Premier Division: 2020 2021

Celtic

- Scottish Premiership: 2021–22, 2023–24, 2024–25, 2025–26
- Scottish League Cup: 2021–22, 2024–25
- Scottish Cup: 2023–24

Individual

- PFAI First Division Team of the Year: 2018
- PFAI Premier Division Team of the Year: 2021
- PFA Scotland Team of the Year: 2023–24 Premiership
