= Reo Hatate =

Japanese footballer (born 1997)

Reo Hatate 旗手 怜央
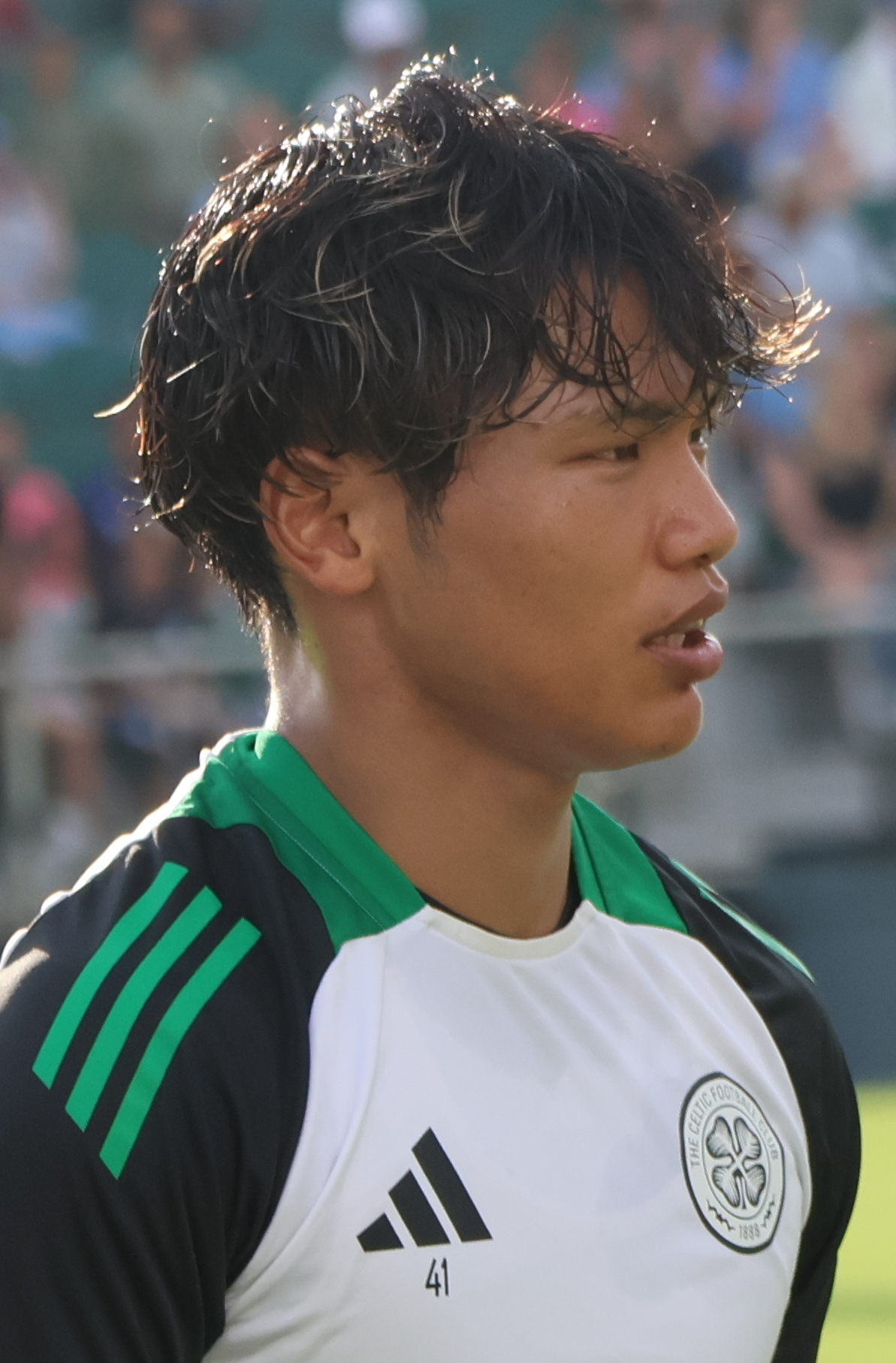
- Hatate training with Celtic in 2024

Personal information
- Date of birth: 21 November 1997 (age 28)
- Place of birth: Suzuka, Mie, Japan
- Height: 1.73 m (5 ft 8 in)
- Position: Central midfielder

Team information
- Current team: Burnley
- Number: 5

Youth career
- FC Yokkaichi
- 2013–2015: Shizuoka Gakuen High School

College career
Years	Team	Apps	(Gls)
2016–2019	Juntendo University		

Senior career*
Years	Team	Apps	(Gls)
2019–2021	Kawasaki Frontale	62	(10)
2022–2026	Celtic	132	(25)
2026–	Burnley	11	(1)

International career^{‡}
2017	Japan U20		
2017–2021	Japan U23	31	(8)
2017–2019	Japan (University)	8	(5)
2022–2025	Japan	11	(0)
Medal record
Representing Japan
Asian Games
Silver medal – second place	2018 Jakarta-Palembang	Team
- * Club domestic league appearances and goals as of 09:40, 8 November 2026 (UTC) ‡ National team caps and goals as of 25 March 2025

Reo Hatate (旗手 怜央, Hatate Reo; born 21 November 1997) is a Japanese professional footballer who plays as a central midfielder for EFL Championship club Burnley.

== Early life ==
Hatate was born in Suzuka, Mie Prefecture and played youth football for FC Yokkaichi before studying at Shizuoka Gakuen High School and later, the Juntendo University. While studying at the Juntendo University, it was announced that Hatate would sign for J1 League side Kawasaki Frontale in 2020, when he graduates. He joined Frontale in 2018 as a designated special player and was approved to continue as a designated player in 2019.

== University ==
Rated as one of the country's most promising university prospects, Hatate was called up to the Japanese University Team to play at the 2017 Summer Universiade, where he scored three goals, helping Japan to win the title for the sixth time. He also featured at the 2018 AFC U-23 Championship, however he did not score in this competition.

Hatate helped Japan to the 2019 Summer Universiade title in July 2019, scoring two goals, including one against Brazil in the final.

== Club career ==
Hatate made his debut at the end of the 2019 J1 League season, coming on as a substitute for Hiroyuki Abe in a 2–1 win over Hokkaido Consadole Sapporo.

The following season, he would go on to establish himself in the Kawasaki Frontale team. Due to his versatility, he was utilised mostly as a left wing-back, but also played as an attacking midfielder, and on both wings. He finished the season with six goals in 38 appearances in all competitions, as Frontale went on to win the 2020 J1 League.

=== Celtic ===
On 31 December 2021, Hatate was announced to have signed a four-and-a-half-year deal with Scottish Premiership club Celtic for a fee believed to be in the region of £1.4 million. On 17 January 2022, he made his debut in a 2–0 win against Hibernian and was awarded man of the match. On 2 February, Hatate recorded two goals and one assist in a 3–0 Old Firm win against Rangers. Hatate would go on to help Celtic win the 2021–22 Scottish Premiership league title that year.

In the following season, Hatate made his UEFA Champions League debut against Real Madrid at Celtic Park. Although Celtic lost the match 3–0, Hatate was praised highly by fans and media outlets alike for his performance against Los Blancos.

On 24 December 2022, due to the unavailability of Josip Juranović and an injury to Anthony Ralston - Hatate started as a right-back in their Scottish Premiership home fixture against St Johnstone, where Hatate would go on to score a brace in a 4–1 home win for Celtic. Hatate was given another man of the match award for this showing, with his ability to be versatile in a number of positions being highlighted by Celtic manager Ange Postecoglou.

On 29 September 2023, Hatate signed a new five-year contract with Celtic, keeping him at the club until 2028. On 5 November 2024, Hatate scored his first goal in the UEFA Champions League in a 3-1 victory against RB Leipzig.

=== Burnley ===
On 1 September 2026, Hatate moved to recently relegated EFL Championship club Burnley for an undisclosed fee on a three-year deal.

== International career ==
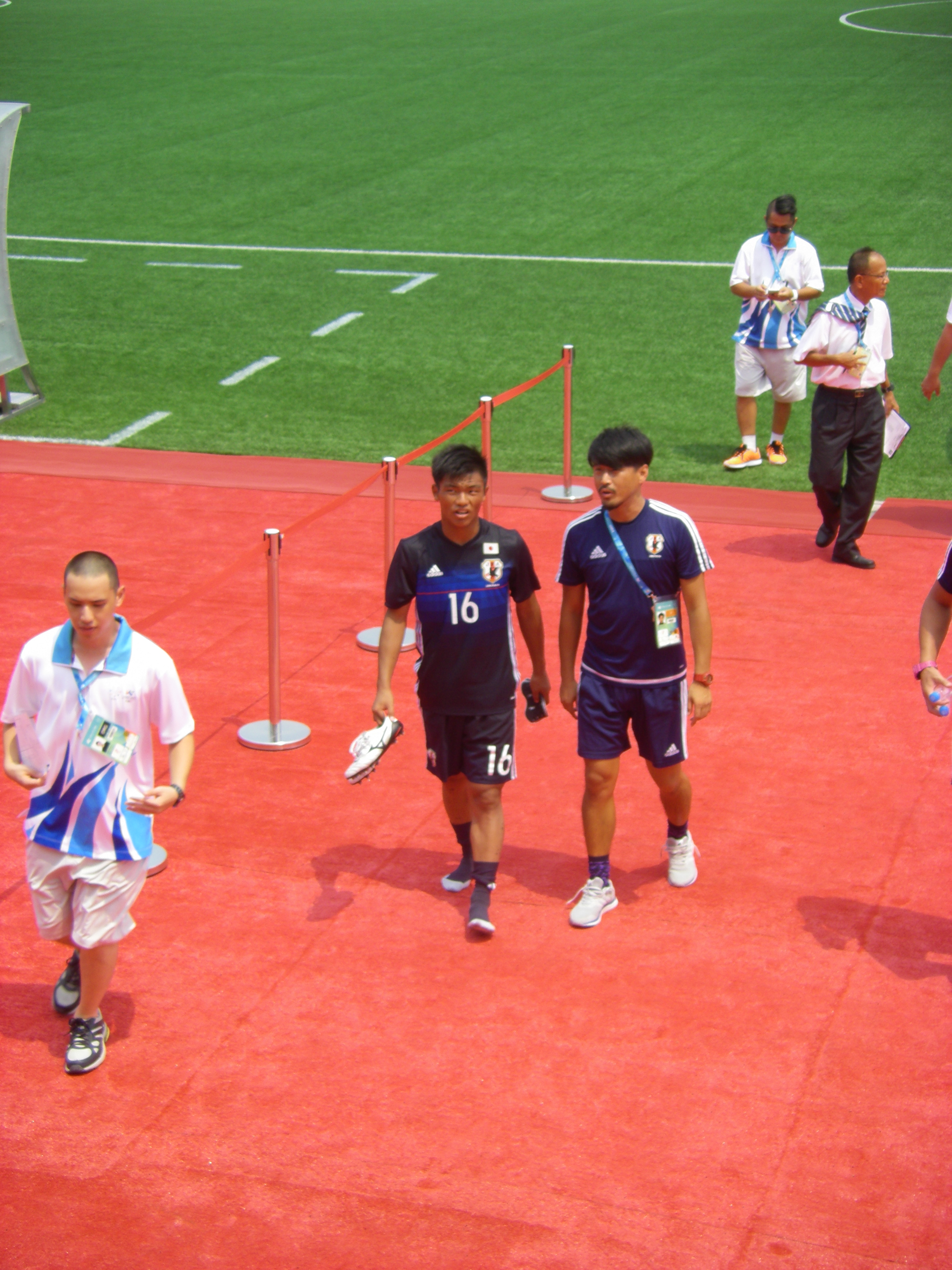
Reo Hatate with Japan U20 in 2017

In 2019, Hatate gained international recognition for his performances at the Toulon Tournament, where he scored two goals to help Japan to the final, where they were eventually defeated on penalties by Brazil. Hatate missed Japan's final penalty, handing the title to Brazil.

Having represented Japan at youth level, Hatate was called up to the Japan U24 team for the 2020 Olympics. On 29 March 2022, Hatate made his debut for Japan against Vietnam in a World Cup Qualifier.

Despite his form at Celtic during the 2022–23 season, Hatate was not included in the Japan squad for the 2022 FIFA World Cup in Qatar. This came as a surprise to many supporters and media outlets at the time, where Japan manager Hajime Moriyasu justified his decision by saying: "We selected players who will be on the same wavelength as a team, who will be able to move and link up together, who through their organisation will be able to make use of their individual strengths".

== Other work ==
Hatate has written articles for Japanese website From the Athlete, where he reflects on his footballing career so far. His first piece was published shortly after his debut for Celtic, where he spoke about his development at Kawasaki Frontale and his time with Japan under-23s at the 2020 Summer Olympics in Tokyo.

== Career statistics ==
=== Club ===
As of match played 7 November 2026

Appearances and goals by club, season and competition
Club	Season	League			National cup (Note: Includes Emperor's Cup, Scottish Cup, FA Cup)		League cup (Note: Includes J.League Cup, Scottish League Cup, EFL Cup)		Continental		Other		Total	
Club	Season	Division	Apps	Goals	Apps	Goals	Apps	Goals	Apps	Goals	Apps	Goals	Apps	Goals
Kawasaki Frontale	2019	J1 League	1	0	0	0	0	0	—		—		1	0
Kawasaki Frontale	2020	J1 League	31	5	2	0	5	1	—		—		38	6
Kawasaki Frontale	2021	J1 League	30	5	3	1	0	0	4 (Note: Appearances in AFC Champions League)	0	1 (Note: Appearance in Japanese Super Cup)	0	38	6
Kawasaki Frontale	Total		62	10	5	1	5	1	4	0	1	0	77	12
Celtic	2021–22	Scottish Premiership	17	4	3	0	—		1 (Note: Appearance in UEFA Europa Conference League)	0	—		21	4
Celtic	2022–23	Scottish Premiership	32	6	4	2	3	1	6 (Note: Appearances in UEFA Champions League)	0	—		45	9
Celtic	2023–24	Scottish Premiership	16	3	2	0	0	0	3	0	—		21	3
Celtic	2024–25	Scottish Premiership	37	10	4	0	4	0	10	1	—		55	11
Celtic	2025–26	Scottish Premiership	30	2	3	0	3	1	11 (Note: Two appearances in UEFA Champions League, nine appearances and three goals in UEFA Europa League)	3	—		47	6
Celtic	2026–27	Scottish Premiership	0	0	0	0	0	0	2	0	—		2	0
Celtic	Total		132	25	16	2	10	2	33	4	—		191	33
Burnley	2026–27	EFL Championship	11	1	0	0	—		—		—		11	1
Career total			205	36	21	3	15	3	37	4	1	0	279	46

=== International ===
As of match played 25 March 2025

Appearances and goals by national team and year
National team	Year	Apps	Goals
Japan	2022	1	0
Japan	2023	4	0
Japan	2024	5	0
Japan	2025	1	0
Total		11	0

== Honours ==
Kawasaki Frontale

- J1 League: 2020, 2021
- Emperor's Cup: 2020
- Japanese Super Cup: 2021

Celtic

- Scottish Premiership (5): 2021–22, 2022–23, 2023–24, 2024–25, 2025–26
- Scottish Cup (2): 2022–23, 2023–24
- Scottish League Cup (2): 2022–23, 2024–25

Individual

- J.League Best XI: 2021
- PFA Scotland Team of the Year (Premiership): 2022–23, 2024–25
- IFFHS Asian Men's Team of the Year: 2025
