= Yang Hyun-jun =

South Korean footballer (born 2002)

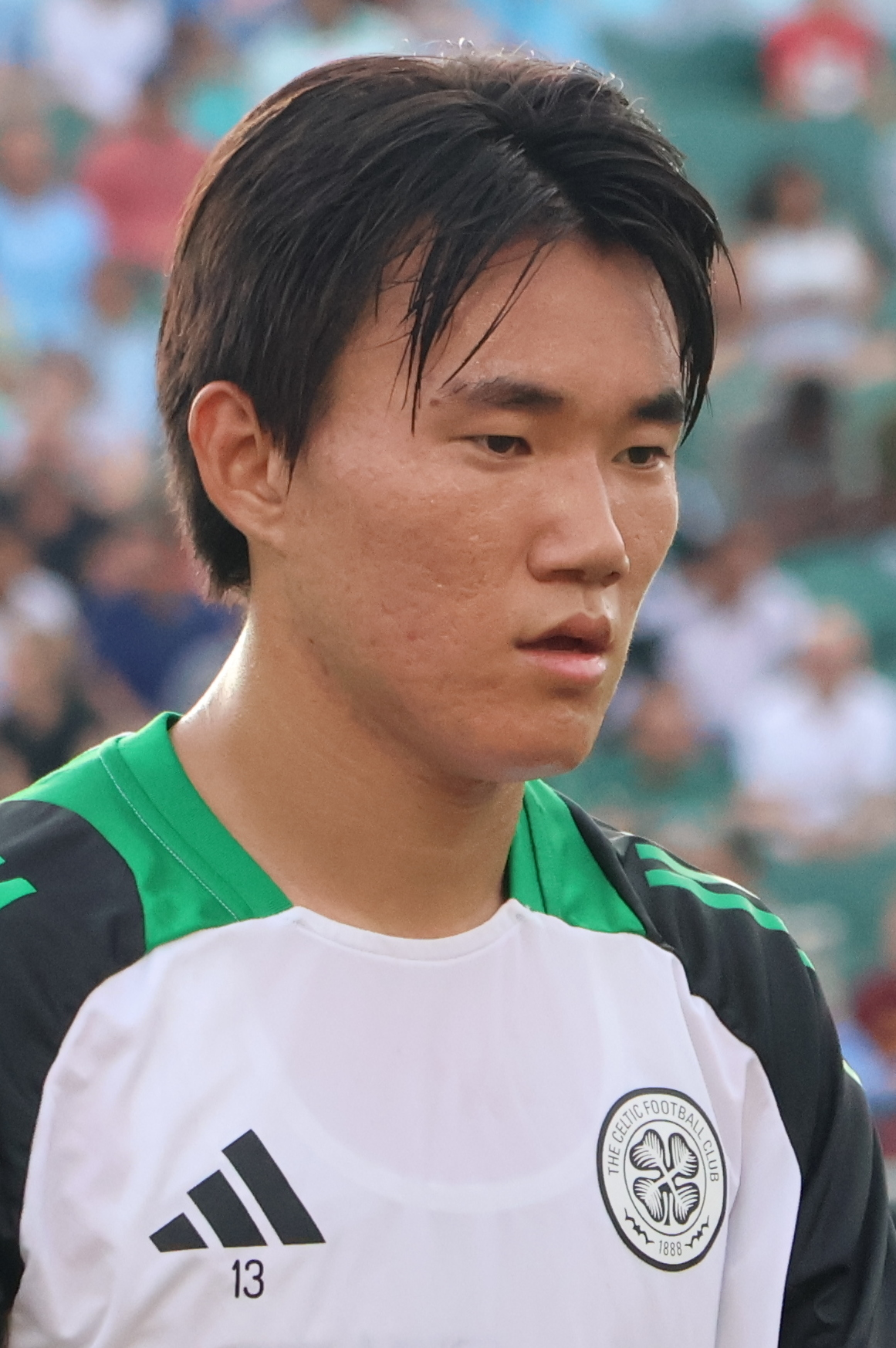
- Hyun-jun training with Celtic in 2024

Personal information
- Date of birth: 25 May 2002 (age 24)
- Place of birth: Busan, South Korea
- Height: 1.76 m (5 ft 9 in)
- Position: Winger

Team information
- Current team: Celtic
- Number: 13

Youth career
- 2018–2021: Busan Information High School

Senior career*
Years	Team	Apps	(Gls)
2021	Gangwon FC B	21	(4)
2021–2023	Gangwon FC	66	(9)
2023–	Celtic	85	(16)

International career^{‡}
2022–	South Korea U23	10 (Note: Includes one appearance as an overage player in Asian Games.)	(0)
2023–	South Korea	10	(0)
Medal record
Men's football
Representing South Korea
Asian Games
Gold medal – first place	2026 Aichi–Nagoya
WAFF U-23 Championship
Winner	2024 Saudi Arabia
- * Club domestic league appearances and goals as of 22 November 2026 ‡ National team caps and goals as of 15 September 2026

- Yang Hyun-jun
- Hangul: 양현준
- Hanja: 楊賢俊
- RR: Yang Hyeonjun
- MR: Yang Hyŏnjun
- IPA: [jaŋ.ɦjʌn.d͡ʑun]

Yang Hyun-jun (Korean: 양현준; born 25 May 2002) is a South Korean professional footballer who plays as a winger (or right wing-back if necessary) for Scottish Premiership club Celtic and the South Korea national team.

== Club career ==
=== Gangwon FC ===
Yang joined Gangwon FC just after graduating from high school in 2021. He was evaluated as the best K League talent by winning four Young Player of the Month awards and the Young Player of the Year award in his second professional season. He attracted Koreans with his dribbling skills during the season, especially in the K League All-Star Game against Tottenham Hotspur.

=== Celtic ===
On 15 July 2023, Gangwon FC announced that Yang would be transferring to Scottish Premiership club Celtic. On 24 July, Celtic announced that Yang had signed on a five-year deal for an undisclosed fee. Yang made his Celtic debut in a 4–2 victory over Ross County on 5 August. He also made his UEFA Champions League debut as a starter in a 2–1 defeat to Lazio on 4 October. He scored his first goal for Celtic in a 6–0 victory over Aberdeen on 12 November.

On 12 February 2025, Yang provided his first Champions League assist in a 2–1 loss to Bayern Munich. On 1 March, he had come on as a 65th minute substitute against St Mirren, and was named the Player of the Match by having two goals and one assist which broke a 2–2 tie.

On 3 January 2026, Yang broke down Rangers' defense with his dribbling to score the opening goal, but Celtic lost 3–1 in the Old Firm derby despite his solo goal. On 10 May, he once again scored a goal in the Old Firm derby, and Celtic won 3–1 this time. In the 2025–26 season, he was promoted from substitute to starter at the club, and helped them surpass the record of 55 Scottish league titles, set by Rangers. The following week, Celtic extended their contract with him until 2030.

== International career ==
Yang was selected for the South Korea national team for the 2023 AFC Asian Cup, playing two matches as a substitute.

Yang was called up to the national team for the 2026 FIFA World Cup. On 18 June 2026, he made his FIFA World Cup debut in a 1–0 defeat to Mexico.

== Career statistics ==
=== Club ===
As of match played 22 November 2026

Appearances and goals by club, season and competition
Club	Season	League			National cup (Note: Includes Korean FA Cup, Scottish Cup)		League cup (Note: Includes Scottish League Cup)		Continental		Total	
Club	Season	Division	Apps	Goals	Apps	Goals	Apps	Goals	Apps	Goals	Apps	Goals
Gangwon FC B	2021	K4 League	21	4	—		—		—		21	4
Gangwon FC	2021	K League 1	9	0	1	0	—		—		10	0
Gangwon FC	2022	K League 1	36	8	2	0	—		—		38	8
Gangwon FC	2023	K League 1	21	1	2	0	—		—		23	1
Gangwon FC	Total		66	9	5	0	—		—		71	9
Celtic	2023–24	Scottish Premiership	24	1	2	0	1	0	4 (Note: Appearances in UEFA Champions League)	0	31	1
Celtic	2024–25	Scottish Premiership	23	5	3	1	2	0	6	0	34	6
Celtic	2025–26	Scottish Premiership	31	8	4	0	3	1	9 (Note: Two appearances in UEFA Champions League, seven appearances and one goal in UEFA Europa League)	1	47	10
Celtic	2026–27	Scottish Premiership	7	2	0	0	0	0	2	0	9	2
Celtic	Total		85	16	9	1	6	1	21	1	121	19
Career total			172	29	14	1	6	1	21	1	213	32

=== International ===
As of match played 18 June 2026

Appearances and goals by national team and year
National team	Year	Apps	Goals
South Korea	2023	1	0
South Korea	2024	2	0
South Korea	2025	3	0
South Korea	2026	4	0
Total		10	0

== Honours ==
Celtic

- Scottish Premiership: 2023–24, 2024–25, 2025–26
- Scottish Cup: 2023–24, 2025–26
- Scottish League Cup: 2024–25

South Korea U23

- WAFF U-23 Championship: 2024
- Asian Games: 2026

Individual

- K League Young Player of the Month: April 2022, June 2022, July 2022, September 2022
- K League All-Star: 2022
- K League Goal of the Month: July 2022
- K League 1 Young Player of the Year: 2022
- Korean FA Young Player of the Year: 2022
- Celtic Young Player of the Year: 2025–26
- Celtic Goal of the Year: 2025–26
