= Benjamin Nygren =

Swedish footballer (born 2001)

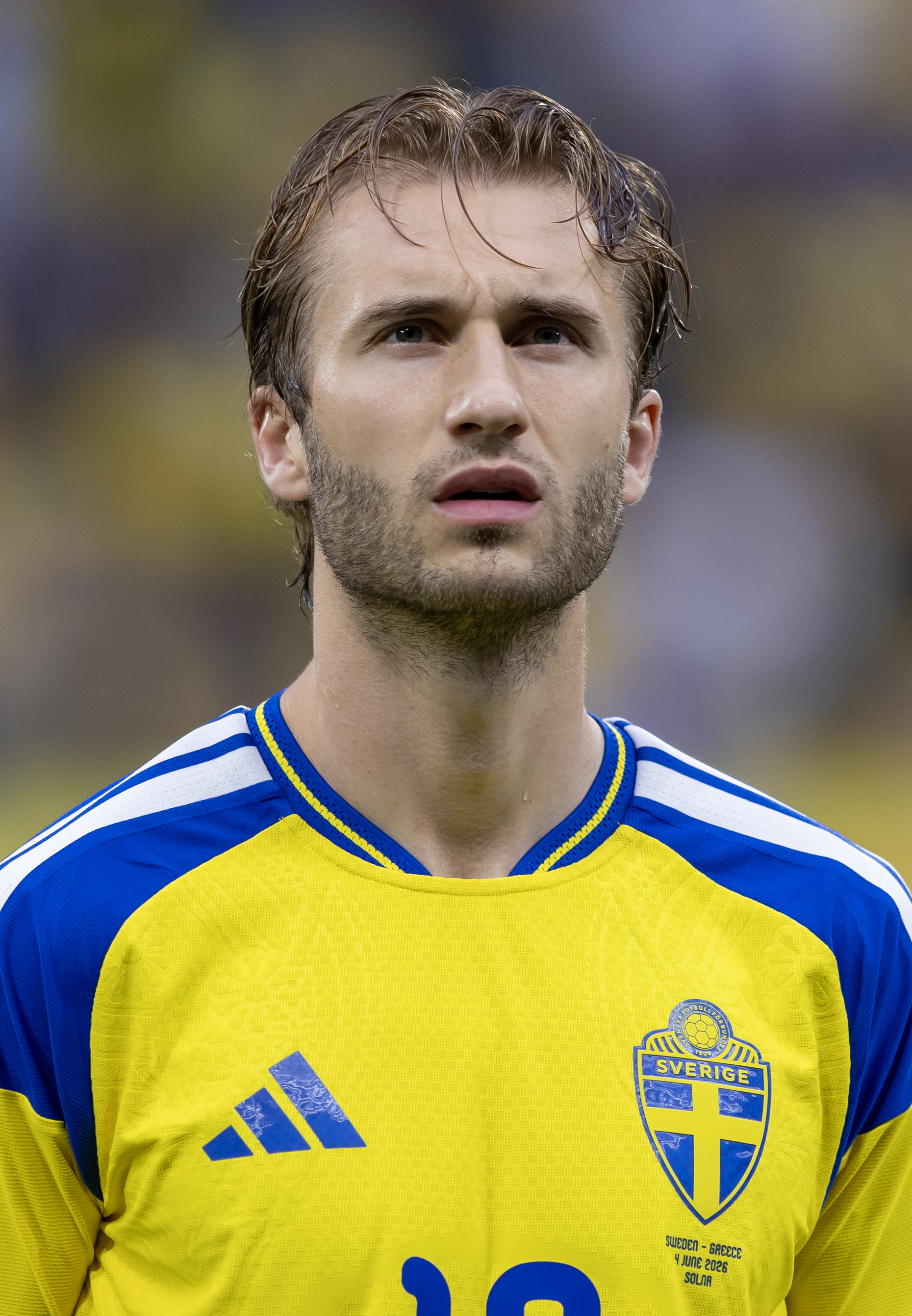
- Nygren with Sweden in 2026

Personal information
- Full name: Erik Benjamin Nygren
- Date of birth: 8 July 2001 (age 25)
- Place of birth: Gothenburg, Sweden
- Height: 1.87 m (6 ft 2 in)
- Positions: Attacking midfielder; winger; forward

Team information
- Current team: Celtic
- Number: 8

Youth career
- 2007–2012: Utbynäs SK
- 2013–2018: IFK Göteborg

Senior career*
Years	Team	Apps	(Gls)
2018–2019	IFK Göteborg	15	(6)
2019–2022	Genk	5	(1)
2020–2022	→ Heerenveen (loan)	45	(4)
2022–2025	Nordsjælland	87	(25)
2025–	Celtic	51	(22)

International career^{‡}
2016–2018	Sweden U17	24	(10)
2018–2019	Sweden U19	8	(6)
2020–2022	Sweden U21	13	(2)
2025–	Sweden	18	(4)
- * Club domestic league appearances and goals as of 20:27, 8 November 2026 (UTC) ‡ National team caps and goals as of 21:50, 14 November 20266 (UTC)

Erik Benjamin Nygren (born 8 July 2001) is a Swedish professional footballer who plays as an attacking midfielder or winger for Scottish Premiership club Celtic and the Sweden national team.

== Club career ==
=== IFK Göteborg ===
Nygren began playing football at Utbynäs SK when he was 5–6 years old. In 2013, at the age of 12, he joined IFK Göteborg. After impressing in the youth teams, Nygren made his first-team debut for IFK Göteborg in a friendly game against Örgryte IS on 24 March 2018. Two months after his debut, in May 2018, Nygren signed his first professional contract with Göteborg, a deal running until the end of 2020, despite interest from foreign clubs such as Manchester City, Bayern Munich and Inter. The new contract also saw the 16-year old Nygren promoted to the first team squad.

Nygren's official debut for Göteborg came against Torns IF in the Swedish Cup on 23 August 2018, where he made a brief appearance in the 4–0 win. Before the season ended, Nygren also made his Allsvenskan debut in a game against Djurgårdens IF on 31 October 2018, and he played in the last three games of the season. In the following match against Malmö FF, Nygren started the game and was in the starting line-up in the final game of the season against Örebro SK, scoring twice in Göteborg's 3–1 victory.

=== Genk ===
On 20 June 2019, 17-year old Nygren joined Belgian club Genk in a record deal for a fee around five million euros. He signed a deal until June 2024. Nygren made his debut for Genk in a Belgian Super Cup win against K.V. Mechelen on 20 July 2019. Nygren also scored Genk's first goal in his home debut on 27 July in a 2–1 win over K.V. Kortrijk.

To get some more playing time and experience, Nygren was loaned out to Dutch side SC Heerenveen on 6 October 2020 for two seasons. In his first season, Nygren scored seven goals in 32 games (16 from start and 16 from the bench). Already after the first season, there was talk that he was on his way out of the club because he was not getting enough playing time, but he ended up staying and started the 2021–22 season out at the Dutch club.

=== Nordsjælland ===
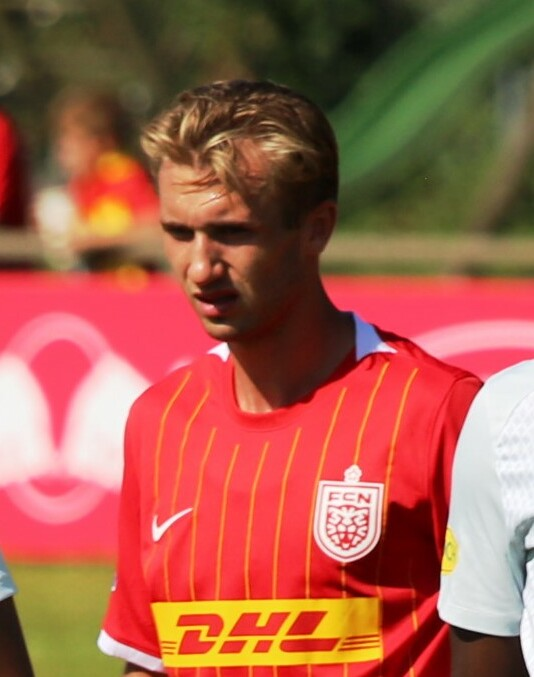
Nygren playing for Nordsjælland in 2023

On 30 January 2022, Nygren got his loan-spell at SC Heerenveen terminated and joined Danish Superliga club FC Nordsjælland on a deal until the end of 2025.

=== Celtic ===
On 27 June 2025, Nygren signed for Scottish Premiership champions Celtic on a five-year-contract for an undisclosed fee. On 3 August, he made his debut for the club in a 1–0 win against St Mirren in the league. On 10 August, he scored his first goal for the club in a 2–0 win against Aberdeen in the league. On 27 December 2025, Nygren scored a double against Livingston in the league, his 9th and 10th goal of the season and his Celtic career until then.

== International career ==
After having represented the Sweden U17, U19, and U21 teams, Nygren made his full international debut for the Sweden national team on 22 March 2025 in a friendly 1–0 loss against Luxembourg, replacing Jesper Karlström in the 82nd minute. He scored his first international game goal three days later in a friendly 5–1 win against Northern Ireland on 25 March 2025.

On 26 March 2026, Nygren assisted Viktor Gyökeres' opening goal in Sweden's 3–1 win against Ukraine in the World Cup playoffs.

On 12 May 2026, Nygren was named in the Sweden squad for the 2026 FIFA World Cup. He made his World Cup debut on 14 June 2026, starting in a 5-1 group stage win against Tunisia.

== Career statistics ==
=== Club ===
As of match played 8 November 2026

Appearances and goals by club, season and competition
Club	Season	League			National cup (Note: Includes Svenska Cupen, KNVB Cup, Danish Cup, Scottish Cup)		League cup (Note: Includes Scottish League Cup)		Europe		Other		Total	
Club	Season	Division	Apps	Goals	Apps	Goals	Apps	Goals	Apps	Goals	Apps	Goals	Apps	Goals
Göteborg	2018	Allsvenskan	3	2	0	0	—		—		—		3	2
Göteborg	2019	Allsvenskan	12	4	0	0	—		—		—		12	4
Göteborg	Total		15	6	0	0	—		—		—		15	6
Genk	2019–20	Belgian Pro League	2	1	1	0	—		0	0	1 (Note: Appearance in Belgian Super Cup)	0	4	0
Genk	2020–21	Belgian Pro League	3	0	0	0	—		0	0	0	0	3	0
Genk	Total		5	1	1	0	—		0	0	1	0	7	0
Heerenveen (loan)	2020–21	Eredivisie	28	4	4	3	—		—		—		32	7
Heerenveen (loan)	2021–22	Eredivisie	17	0	2	0	—		—		—		19	0
Heerenveen (loan)	Total		45	4	6	3	—		—		—		51	7
Nordsjælland	2021–22	Danish Superliga	12	1	—		—		—		—		12	1
Nordsjælland	2022–23	Danish Superliga	25	3	6	3	—		0	0	—		31	6
Nordsjælland	2023–24	Danish Superliga	20	6	2	1	—		9 (Note: Appearances in UEFA Europa Conference League)	5	—		31	12
Nordsjælland	2024–25	Danish Superliga	30	15	2	1	—		—		—		32	16
Nordsjælland	Total		87	25	10	4	—		9	5	—		106	35
Celtic	2025–26	Scottish Premiership	38	16	5	1	3	0	12 (Note: Two appearances in UEFA Champions League, ten appearances and four goals in UEFA Europa League)	4	—		58	21
Celtic	2026–27	Scottish Premiership	13	6	0	0	2	1	6 (Note: Two appearances and one goal in UEFA Champions League, four appearances in UEFA Europa League)	1	—		21	8
Celtic	Total		51	22	5	1	5	1	18	5	—		79	29
Career total			203	58	22	9	5	1	27	10	1	0	258	77

=== International ===
As of match played 14 November 2026

Appearances and goals by national team and year
National team	Year	Apps	Goals
Sweden	2025	7	3
Sweden	2026	11	1
Total		18	4

Scores and results list Sweden's goal tally first, score column indicates score after each Nygren goal.

List of international goals scored by Benjamin Nygren
No.	Date	Venue	Opponent	Score	Result	Competition	Ref.
1	25 March 2025	Strawberry Arena, Solna, Sweden	Northern Ireland	2–0	5–1	Friendly	
2	6 June 2025	Puskás Aréna, Budapest, Hungary	Hungary	1–0	2–0	Friendly	
3	15 November 2025	Stade de Genève, Geneva, Switzerland	Switzerland	1–1	1–4	2026 FIFA World Cup qualification	
4	28 September 2026	Strawberry Arena, Solna, Sweden	Poland	1–0	3–1	2026–27 UEFA Nations League B	

== Honours ==
Celtic

- Scottish Premiership: 2025–26
- Scottish Cup: 2025–26

Individual

- Danish Superliga Team of the Year: 2024–25
- PFA Scotland Team of the Year (Premiership): 2025–26
- Celtic Player of the Year: 2025–26
