= Dane Murray =

Scottish footballer (born 2003)

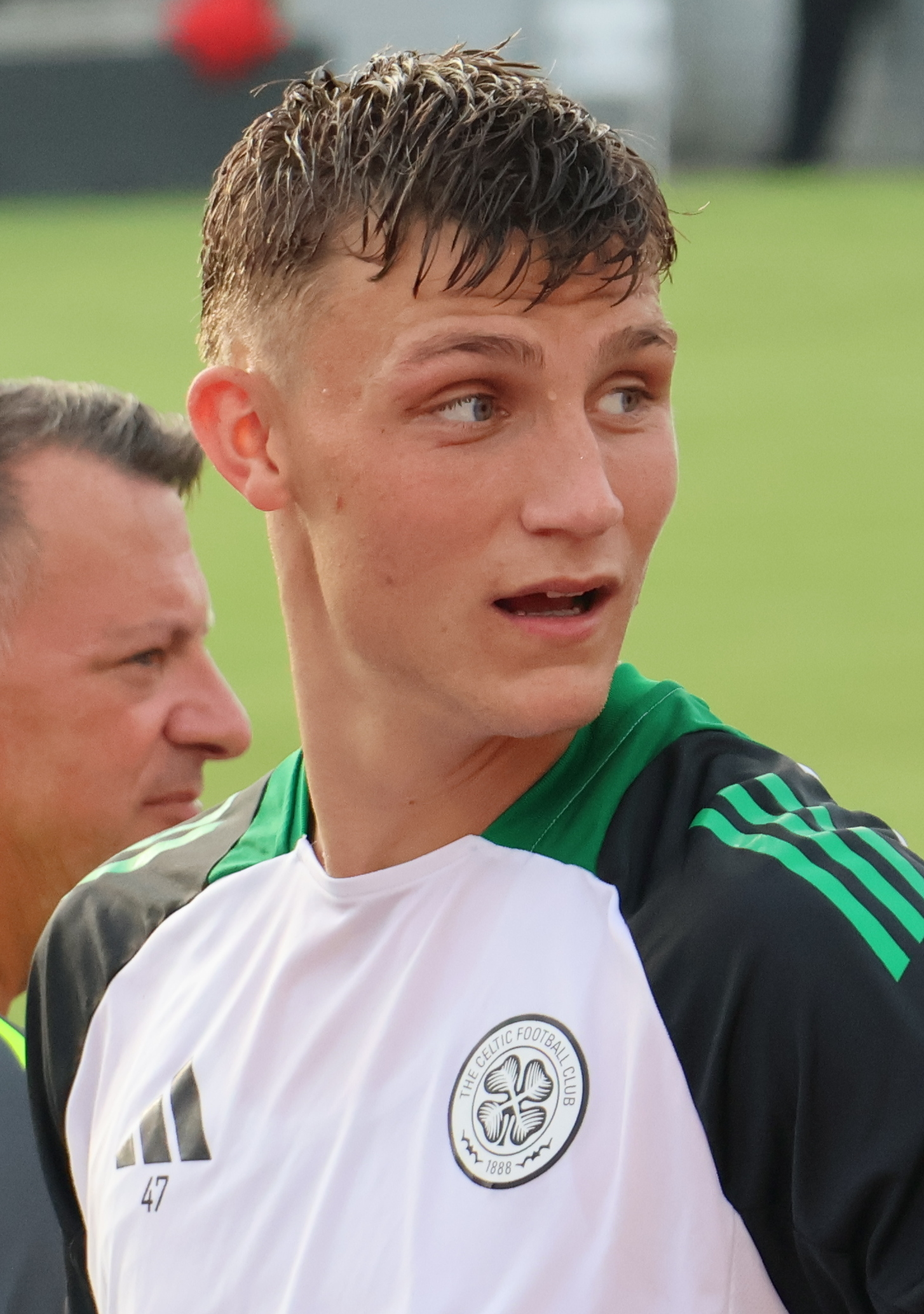
- Murray training with Celtic in 2024

Personal information
- Full name: Dane Ben Murray
- Date of birth: 26 June 2003 (age 23)
- Place of birth: Airdrie, Scotland
- Height: 1.93 m (6 ft 4 in)
- Position: Centre-back

Team information
- Current team: Celtic
- Number: 47

Youth career
- Celtic

Senior career*
| Years | Team | Apps | (Gls) |
| 2021– | Celtic | 12 | (0) |
| 2024–2025 | → Queen's Park (loan) | 18 | (0) |

International career^{‡}
| 2019 | Scotland U16 | 2 | (0) |
| 2019–2021 | Scotland U17 | 3 | (0) |
| 2021–2022 | Scotland U19 | 6 | (0) |
| 2022– | Scotland U21 | 4 | (1) |
- * Club domestic league appearances and goals as of 25 October 2026 ‡ National team caps and goals as of 22 March 2025

Dane Ben Murray (born 26 June 2003) is a Scottish professional footballer who plays as a centre-back for Scottish Premiership club Celtic.

== Club career ==
Murray's footballing journey began by being scouted by Celtic as a six-year-old and steadily progressed through their youth academy. In June 2019, Murray signed his first professional contract with Celtic.

Murray’s senior debut came on 20 July 2021, during a UEFA Champions League qualifier against FC Midtjylland. At just 18 years old, he was introduced as a substitute in the 1-1 draw. Murray was entrusted with a starting position in the return leg on July 28, 2021, playing the full 120 minutes in a match that concluded with a 2-1 extra-time defeat for Celtic.

To continue his development and provide regular first-team experience, Murray was loaned to Scottish Championship side, Queen’s Park for the 2024-2025 season. He made his debut for the club in August 2024 and quickly established himself as a key figure in their defense. Over the course of his loan spell, Murray amassed 20 appearances and an assist across all competitions.

In January 2025, Celtic exercised a recall clause, bringing Murray back to the club. This decision was influenced by squad dynamics, notably the anticipated loan departure of fellow defender Stephen Welsh to KV Mechelen.

== International career ==
Murray has represented Scotland at various youth levels.

Murray currently represents Scotland U21.

== Playing style ==
Standing at 1.93 meters, Murray is a left-sided centre-back known for his composure on the ball and tactical awareness. His height and physical presence make him a formidable opponent in aerial duels, while his ability to read the game contributes to effective defensive positioning. Though he has been known to score own goals on a number of occasions.

== Career statistics ==
=== Club ===
As of 25 October 2026

Appearances and goals by club, season and competition
| Club | Season | League | | | Scottish Cup | | League Cup | | Other | | Total | |
| Club | Season | Division | Apps | Goals | Apps | Goals | Apps | Goals | Apps | Goals | Apps | Goals |
|---|---|---|---|---|---|---|---|---|---|---|---|---|
| Celtic | 2021–22 | Scottish Premiership | 0 | 0 | 0 | 0 | 0 | 0 | 2 (Note: Appearances in UEFA Champions League) | 0 | 2 | 0 |
| Celtic | 2024–25 | Scottish Premiership | 0 | 0 | 1 | 0 | 0 | 0 | 1 | 0 | 2 | 0 |
| Celtic | 2025–26 | Scottish Premiership | 7 | 0 | 3 | 0 | 1 | 1 | 5 (Note: One appearance in UEFA Champions League, four appearances in UEFA Europa League) | 0 | 16 | 1 |
| Celtic | 2026–27 | Scottish Premiership | 5 | 0 | 0 | 0 | 1 | 0 | 3 (Note: One appearance in UEFA Champions League, two appearances in UEFA Europa League) | 0 | 9 | 0 |
| Celtic | Total | | 12 | 0 | 4 | 0 | 2 | 1 | 11 | 0 | 29 | 1 |
| Queen's Park (loan) | 2024–25 | Scottish Championship | 18 | 0 | 0 | 0 | 1 | 0 | 1 (Note: Appearance in Scottish Challenge Cup) | 0 | 20 | 0 |
| Career total | | | 30 | 1 | 4 | 0 | 3 | 1 | 12 | 0 | 49 | 1 |

== Honours ==
Celtic

- Scottish Premiership (1): 2025–26
- Scottish Cup (1): 2025–26
