= Sebastian Tounekti =

Tunisia international footballer (born 2002)

Personal information
- Date of birth: 13 July 2002 (age 24)
- Place of birth: Tromsø, Norway
- Height: 1.83 m (6 ft 0 in)
- Position: Left winger

Team information
- Current team: Celtic
- Number: 17

Youth career
- –2018: Tromsdalen

Senior career*
Years	Team	Apps	(Gls)
2018–2019	Tromsdalen	12	(0)
2020–2022	Bodø/Glimt	14	(1)
2021–2022	→ Groningen (loan)	0	(0)
2022–2025	Haugesund	41	(4)
2023	→ Ranheim (loan)	5	(1)
2025	Hammarby IF	21	(3)
2025–	Celtic	36	(2)

International career^{‡}
2017	Norway U15	4	(1)
2019	Norway U17	5	(0)
2020	Norway U19	3	(1)
2021–	Tunisia	15	(1)
- * Club domestic league appearances and goals as of 20:39, 1 November 2026 (UTC) ‡ National team caps and goals as of 26 June 2026

Sebastian Tounekti (born 13 July 2002) is a professional footballer who plays as a left winger for Scottish Premiership club Celtic. Born in Norway, he plays for the Tunisia national team.

== Club career ==
=== Tromsdalen ===
Tounekti was born in Tromsø. He made his senior debut for Tromsdalen on 30 September 2018 against Ullensaker/Kisa; Tromsdalen won 3–0.

=== Bodø/Glimt ===
He made his senior debut for Bodø/Glimt on 16 June 2020 against Viking; Bodø/Glimt won 4–2. He scored his first and only goal in October 2020 against Molde. Tounekti and George Lewis were both players at Tromsdalen who were discovered by clubs other than Tromsdalen's larger neighbour Tromsø IL, the failure to pick them up being lamented by Tromsø fans. Tounekti was part of the Bodø/Glimt squad that won the Eliteserien title in 2020. He also appeared as a substitute in both legs of the UEFA Champions League qualifying round against Legia Warsaw.

=== Groningen ===
In the end of the transfer window, the 19-year-old joined Dutch Eredivisie club FC Groningen on loan from Bodø/Glimt for the remainder of the 2021–22 season.

=== Haugesund ===
On 30 August 2022, Tounekti signed a four-year contract with the Eliteserien club. He had his breakthrough during the 2024 season.

=== Hammarby ===
Tounekti moved to Sweden on 9 February 2025, joining Allsvenskan side Hammarby Fotboll on a five-year contract.

=== Celtic ===
Tounetki joined Scottish Premiership side Celtic on 1 September 2025 on a five-year contract. He made his debut against Kilmarnock at Rugby Park on 14 September 2025. He scored his first goal on the 21 September 2025 in a Scottish League Cup Quarter final 4-0 win against Partick Thistle at Firhill Stadium.

== International career ==
Tounekti was born in Norway to a Tunisian father and Norwegian mother. He was a youth international for Norway up until U19 level. He was called up to represent the senior Tunisia national team on 19 March 2021. He debuted with Tunisia in a 3–0 2022 FIFA World Cup qualification win over Mauritania on 7 October 2021.

Tounekti did not receive another call up for four years, returning for an international friendly against Morocco in June 2025. He also played in a World Cup playoff against Equatorial Guinea in September 2025.

Tounekti was named to Tunisia’s 26-man squad for the 2026 FIFA World Cup on 15 May 2026. He made his World Cup debut against Sweden on 14 June 2026 and earned his first World Cup start against Japan on 21 June 2026.

== Personal life ==
Tounekti is the cousin of the Norwegian footballer Bryan Fiabema.

== Career statistics ==
=== Club ===
As of match played 5 November 2026

Appearances and goals by club, season and competition
Club	Season	League			National cup		Continental		Other		Total	
Club	Season	Division	Apps	Goals	Apps	Goals	Apps	Goals	Apps	Goals	Apps	Goals
Tromsdalen	2018	Norwegian First Division	1	0	0	0	–		–		1	0
Tromsdalen	2019	Norwegian First Division	11	0	1	0	–		–		12	0
Tromsdalen	Total		12	0	1	0	–		–		13	0
Bodø/Glimt	2020	Eliteserien	9	1	–		1	1	–		10	2
Bodø/Glimt	2021	Eliteserien	5	0	2	0	4	0	–		11	0
Bodø/Glimt	Total		14	1	2	0	5	1	–		21	2
Groningen (loan)	2021–22	Eredivisie	0	0	0	0	–		–		0	0
Haugesund	2022	Eliteserien	5	0	0	0	–		–		5	0
Haugesund	2023	Eliteserien	7	0	3	0	–		–		10	0
Haugesund	2024	Eliteserien	29	4	1	0	–		2	0	32	4
Haugesund	Total		41	4	4	0	–		2	0	47	4
Ranheim (loan)	2023	Norwegian First Division	5	1	0	0	–		–		5	1
Hammarby IF	2025	Allsvenskan	21	3	2	1	4	0	–		27	4
Celtic	2025–26	Scottish Premiership	27	2	5	2	10	0	3	1	45	5
Celtic	2026–27	Scottish Premiership	9	0	0	0	6	0	2	1	17	1
Celtic	Total		36	2	5	2	16	0	5	2	62	6
Career total			129	11	14	3	25	1	7	2	175	17

=== International ===
As of match played 25 June 2026

Appearances and goals by national team, and year
National team	Year	Apps	Goals
Tunisia	2021	1	0
Tunisia	2025	7	0
Tunisia	2026	7	1
Total		15	1

Scores and results list Tunisia's goal tally first.

List of international goals scored by Sebastian Tounekti
No.	Date	Venue	Opponent	Score	Result	Competition
1	28 March 2026	BMO Field, Toronto, Canada	Haiti	1–0	1–0	Friendly

== Honours ==
Bodø/Glimt

- Eliteserien: 2020, 2021

Celtic

- Scottish Premiership: 2025–26
- Scottish Cup: 2025–26
