= Landon Emenalo =

English footballer (born 2008)

Personal information
- Full name: Landon Cruz Buzi Emenalo
- Date of birth: 18 January 2008 (age 18)
- Place of birth: Tucson, Arizona, United States
- Height: 1.80 m (5 ft 11 in)
- Position: Midfielder

Team information
- Current team: Celtic (on loan from Chelsea)
- Number: 12

Youth career
- 2015–2017: Chelsea
- 2017–2019: Monaco
- 2019–2026: Chelsea

Senior career*
Years	Team	Apps	(Gls)
2026–	Chelsea	0	(0)
2026–	→ Celtic (loan)	2	(0)

International career^{‡}
2023	England U16	4	(1)
2024	United States U17	3	(0)
2024	England U17	6	(0)
2025	England U18	5	(0)
2026–	England U19	4	(0)
- * Club domestic league appearances and goals ‡ National team caps and goals as of 16:36, 17 November 2026 (UTC)

Landon Cruz Buzi Emenalo (born 18 January 2008) is a professional footballer who plays as a midfielder for Scottish Premiership club Celtic, on loan from Premier League side Chelsea. Born in the United States, he represents England at youth level. He has previously played for the United States U-17 team.

== Early life ==
Emenalo was born on 18 January 2008. Born in Arizona, United States, he is the son of former Nigeria international and former Chelsea technical director Michael Emenalo and an American mother. He moved to England at a young age.

== Club career ==
As a youth player, Emenalo joined the youth academy of English Premier League side Chelsea. In 2017, he joined the youth academy of French Ligue 1 side Monaco. Subsequently, he returned to the youth academy of English Premier League side Chelsea in 2019. English newspaper wrote in 2025 that he was "a key fixture in the [club's] Under-18s side".

On 17 April 2025, Emenalo received his first call-up to the first-team, being an unused substitute during Chelsea's Europa Conference League quarter-final match against Ekstraklasa side Legia Warszawa.

On 2 September 2026, Emenalo joined Scottish Premiership side Celtic on loan until the end of the season. An injury meant that he stayed at Chelsea for rehabilitation, before finally being unveiled as a Celtic player on 13 October.

== International career ==
In December 2023, Emenalo scored a goal for England under-16 against Republic of Ireland. He was a member of the England U17 squad at the 2025 UEFA European Under-17 Championship and made an appearance in their opening game against Belgium. Later that year Emenalo was initially selected for the 2025 FIFA U-17 World Cup however he withdrew before the tournament due to injury.

On 3 September 2025, Emenalo made his England U18 debut during a 3–1 win over Uzbekistan.

== Style of play ==
Emenalo plays as a midfielder. Known for his versatility and passing ability, he is left-footed.

== Career statistics ==
=== Club ===
As of 26 August 2025

Appearances and goals by club, season and competition
Club	Season	League			FA Cup		EFL Cup		Europe		Other		Total	
Club	Season	Division	Apps	Goals	Apps	Goals	Apps	Goals	Apps	Goals	Apps	Goals	Apps	Goals
Chelsea U21s	2025–26	—			—		—		—		1 (Note: Appearance(s) in EFL Trophy)	0	1	0
Career total			0	0	0	0	0	0	0	0	1	0	1	0
