= Hayato Inamura =

Japanese footballer (born 2002)

Personal information
- Date of birth: 6 May 2002 (age 24)
- Place of birth: Tokyo, Japan
- Height: 1.82 m (6 ft 0 in)
- Positions: Centre-back; left-back

Team information
- Current team: FC Tokyo

Youth career
- –2014: Gekkouhara SC
- 2015–2017: FC Tokyo Fukagawa
- 2018–2020: Maebashi Ikuei High School

College career
Years	Team	Apps	(Gls)
2021–2024	Toyo University		

Senior career*
Years	Team	Apps	(Gls)
2024–2025	Albirex Niigata	28	(1)
2025–2026	Celtic	1	(0)
2026	→ FC Tokyo (loan)	16	(0)
2026–	FC Tokyo	0	(0)
- * Club domestic league appearances and goals as of 9 May 2026

Hayato Inamura (稲村 隼翔, Inamura Hayato; born 6 May 2002) is a Japanese professional footballer who plays as left-back or centre-back for J1 League club FC Tokyo.

== Career ==
=== Early career ===
Born in Japan's capital, Tokyo, Inamura played there for Gekkouhara SC and the U-15 of FC Tokyo, at their Fukagawa unit. After studying at the Maebashi Ikuei High School in Maebashi, Gunma Prefecture, Inamura enrolled at the Toyo University in 2021.

=== Albirex Niigata ===
In his third year of university, he was offered a contract with J1 League club Albirex Niigata, beginning in the 2025 season. However, due to his potential, he joined the team in 2024 as a designated special player. He made his debut on 17 April 2024 in the J.League Cup against Iwaki FC, and went on to establish himself in the first team, while also featuring for Toyo University in the Kantō University Soccer League. In his first season he helped the club reach the J.League Cup final, and played the entire game as Albirex Niigata lost 8–7 on penalties after a 3–3 draw in normal time to Nagoya Grampus. In December 2024, he helped Toyo University to the 2024 All Japan University Football Championship title, their first time winning the championship.

=== Celtic ===
Inamura left Albirex Niigata on 29 June 2025, in order to facilitate a move to an unnamed foreign club. On 4 July 2025, Inamura signed for Scottish Premiership club Celtic on a four-year deal. He made his debut on 23 August against Livingston, but did not make another appearance afterwards.

=== FC Tokyo ===
During the January transfer window, he was loaned back to Japan with J1 League side FC Tokyo for the remainder of the season.

On 28 June 2026, having made just a solitary appearance for Celtic, Inamura left the Parkhead side to join FC Tokyo on a permanent deal.

== Style of play ==
Initially a right winger who also played as a defensive midfielder, Inamura was converted to centre-back in his second year of high school by coach Kosuke Yamada, who told him to model his game on centre-back Ryotaro Tsunoda.

== Career statistics ==
As of 21 August 2026

Appearances and goals by club, season and competition
Club	Season	League			National cup (Note: Includes Emperor's Cup and Scottish Cup)		League cup (Note: Includes J.League Cup and Scottish League Cup)		Other		Total	
Club	Season	Division	Apps	Goals	Apps	Goals	Apps	Goals	Apps	Goals	Apps	Goals
Albirex Niigata	2024	J1 League	12	0	0	0	7	0	—		19	0
Albirex Niigata	2025	J1 League	16	1	1	0	0	0	—		17	1
Albirex Niigata	Total		28	1	1	0	7	0	—		36	1
Celtic	2025–26	Scottish Premiership	1	0	0	0	0	0	0	0	1	0
FC Tokyo (loan)	2026	J1 League	16	0	0	0	0	0	0	0	16	0
FC Tokyo	2026–27	J1 League	2	0	0	0	0	0	0	0	2	0
Career total			31	1	1	0	7	0	0	0	39	1
