= 2024–25 Celtic F.C. season =

Celtic F.C.
2024–25 season
- Chairman: Peter Lawwell
- Manager: Brendan Rodgers
- Stadium: Celtic Park
- Premiership: 1st
- Scottish Cup: Runners-up
- League Cup: Winners
- Champions League: Knockout phase play-offs
- Top goalscorer: League: Daizen Maeda (16); All: Daizen Maeda (33)
- Average home league attendance: 58,903
Home colours	Away colours	Third colours

The 2024–25 season was Celtic's 131st season of competitive football.

== Pre-season and friendlies ==
Celtic faced Ayr United and Queen's Park in early July. They then travelled to the United States, where they played friendlies against D.C. United, Manchester City and Chelsea.

5 July 2024 Friendly	Ayr United	1–1	Celtic	Ayr
19:45 BST	Dowds 34' (pen.)	Report	Furuhashi 24' (pen.)	Stadium: Somerset Park

10 July 2024 Friendly	Queen's Park	4–6	Celtic	Glasgow
19:45 BST	Paton 15'; Thomas 22'; Longridge 70'; McDonnell 85'	Report	Furuhashi 6', 24', 60'; O'Riley 39'; Oh 67'; Turley 73'	Stadium: Lesser Hampden

20 July 2024 Friendly	D.C. United	0–4	Celtic	Washington, D.C., United States
19:30 EDT		Report	O'Riley 24', 31'; Johnston 64'; Forrest 68'	Stadium: Audi Field

23 July 2024 Friendly	Manchester City	3–4	Celtic	Chapel Hill, United States
19:30 EDT	Bobb 33'; Perrone 46'; Haaland 57'	Report	Kühn 13', 36'; Furuhashi 44'; Palma 68'	Stadium: Kenan Stadium

27 July 2024 Friendly	Chelsea	1–4	Celtic	Notre Dame, United States
16:00 EDT	Nkunku 89' (pen.)	Report	O'Riley 19'; Furuhashi 33'; Palma 76'; Johnston 79'	Stadium: Notre Dame Stadium

9 October 2024 Friendly	Sligo Rovers	2–3	Celtic	Sligo, Ireland
19:30 IST	Barlow 13'; Power 17'	Report	Palma 9', 89', 90'	Stadium: The Showgrounds

== Scottish Premiership ==
The Premiership fixture list was announced on 27 June 2024. Celtic began their title defence against Kilmarnock at Celtic Park.

4 August 2024	Celtic	4–0	Kilmarnock	Glasgow
16:30 BST	Hatate 17'; Scales 40'; Kühn 59'; Ralston 90+4'	Report		Stadium: Celtic Park; Attendance: 58,712; Referee: Don Robertson

11 August 2024	Hibernian	0–2	Celtic	Edinburgh
12:30 BST		Report	Kühn 3'; McGregor 19'	Stadium: Easter Road; Attendance: 17,918; Referee: Nick Walsh

25 August 2024	St Mirren	0–3	Celtic	Paisley
12:00 BST		Report	McGregor 3'; Hatate 33'; Johnston 71'	Stadium: St Mirren Park; Attendance: 6,940; Referee: Chris Graham

1 September 2024	Celtic	3–0	Rangers	Glasgow
12:30 BST	Maeda 17'; Furuhashi 40'; McGregor 75'	Report		Stadium: Celtic Park; Attendance: 59,612; Referee: John Beaton

14 September 2024	Celtic	2–0	Heart of Midlothian	Glasgow
15:00 BST	Engels 52' (pen.); McCowan 89'	Report		Stadium: Celtic Park; Attendance: 58,872; Referee: Colin Steven

28 September 2024	St Johnstone	0–6	Celtic	Perth
17:45 BST		Report	Furuhashi 35', 45'; Bernardo 43'; McGregor 54'; Maeda 72'; Idah 83'	Stadium: McDiarmid Park; Attendance: 7,036; Referee: Don Robertson

6 October 2024	Ross County	1–2	Celtic	Dingwall
12:00 BST	Hale 43' (pen.)	Report	Johnston 76'; Kühn 88'	Stadium: Victoria Park; Attendance: 6,372; Referee: Kevin Clancy

19 October 2024	Celtic	2–2	Aberdeen	Glasgow
15:00 BST	Hatate 24'; Furuhashi 27'	Report	Sokler 50'; Shinnie 60'	Stadium: Celtic Park; Attendance: 58,890; Referee: Nick Walsh

27 October 2024	Motherwell	0–3	Celtic	Motherwell
15:00 BST		Report	McCowan 27'; Johnston 56'; Idah 88'	Stadium: Fir Park; Attendance: 8,692; Referee: David Dickinson

30 October 2024	Celtic	2–0	Dundee	Glasgow
19:45 GMT	Johnston 60'; Engels 67' (pen.)	Report		Stadium: Celtic Park; Attendance: 58,751; Referee: Ross Hardie

10 November 2024	Kilmarnock	0–2	Celtic	Kilmarnock
15:00 GMT		Report	McGregor 45+4'; Kühn 71'	Stadium: Rugby Park; Attendance: 8,657; Referee: Nick Walsh

23 November 2024	Heart of Midlothian	1–4	Celtic	Edinburgh
19:45 GMT	Drammeh 82'	Report	Furuhashi 55'; Kühn 60'; Idah 78', 90+4' (pen.)	Stadium: Tynecastle Park; Attendance: 17,894; Referee: Steven McLean

30 November 2024	Celtic	5–0	Ross County	Glasgow
15:00 GMT	Scales 10'; McCowan 27'; Bernardo 35'; McGregor 36'; Idah 40'	Report		Stadium: Celtic Park; Attendance: 58,436; Referee: Calum Scott

4 December 2024	Aberdeen	0–1	Celtic	Aberdeen
20:00 GMT		Report	Hatate 78'	Stadium: Pittodrie Stadium; Attendance: 18,043; Referee: Don Robertson

7 December 2024	Celtic	3–0	Hibernian	Glasgow
15:00 GMT	Engels 6'; Newell 54' (o.g.); Furuhashi 84'	Report		Stadium: Celtic Park; Attendance: 58,641; Referee: Chris Graham

22 December 2024	Dundee United	0–0	Celtic	Dundee
12:00 GMT		Report		Stadium: Tannadice Park; Attendance: 13,662; Referee: David Dickinson

26 December 2024	Celtic	4–0	Motherwell	Glasgow
15:00 GMT	Engels 45+1' (pen.); Maeda 57'; Kühn 74'; Hatate 81'	Report		Stadium: Celtic Park; Attendance: 58,687; Referee: Ross Hardie

29 December 2024	Celtic	4–0	St Johnstone	Glasgow
15:00 GMT	Kühn 30'; Furuhashi 59', 64'; Maeda 73'	Report		Stadium: Celtic Park; Attendance: 58,645; Referee: Matthew MacDermid

2 January 2025	Rangers	3–0	Celtic	Glasgow
15:00 GMT	Hagi 7'; Pröpper 66'; Danilo 81'	Report		Stadium: Ibrox Stadium; Attendance: 51,065; Referee: Don Robertson

5 January 2025	Celtic	3–0	St Mirren	Glasgow
15:00 GMT	Kühn 33', 68'; Trusty 43'	Report		Stadium: Celtic Park; Attendance: 58,838; Referee: Grant Irvine

8 January 2025	Celtic	2–0	Dundee United	Glasgow
19:45 GMT	Maeda 23'; Hatate 83'	Report		Stadium: Celtic Park; Attendance: 58,460; Referee: Kevin Clancy

11 January 2025	Ross County	1–4	Celtic	Dingwall
12:30 GMT	White 60' (pen.)	Report	Furuhashi 40', 81'; Engels 90+6' (pen.); McCowan 90+8'	Stadium: Victoria Park; Attendance: 6,254; Referee: Matthew MacDermid

14 January 2025	Dundee	3–3	Celtic	Dundee
20:00 GMT	Adewumi 41'; Carter-Vickers 54' (o.g.); Donnelly 78'	Report	McCowan 5'; Yang 53'; Engels 90+3' (pen.)	Stadium: Dens Park; Attendance: 8,816; Referee: Don Robertson

2 February 2025	Motherwell	1–3	Celtic	Motherwell
15:00 GMT	Armstrong 23'	Report	Maeda 1'; Idah 29'; Jota 90+4'	Stadium: Fir Park; Attendance: 8,293; Referee: Calum Scott

5 February 2025	Celtic	6–0	Dundee	Glasgow
19:45 GMT	Engels 18' (pen.), 71'; Idah 45+1'; Maeda 55', 59'; Kühn 81'	Report		Stadium: Celtic Park; Attendance: 58,541; Referee: Colin Steven

15 February 2025	Celtic	3–0	Dundee United	Glasgow
15:00 GMT	McGregor 23'; Jota 35'; Idah 84'	Report		Stadium: Celtic Park; Attendance: 58,989; Referee: Nick Walsh

22 February 2025	Hibernian	2–1	Celtic	Edinburgh
12:30 GMT	Campbell 2', 45+4'	Report	Maeda 68'	Stadium: Easter Road; Attendance: 18,357; Referee: Steven McLean

25 February 2025	Celtic	5–1	Aberdeen	Glasgow
20:00 GMT	Maeda 24', 90+2'; Jota 30'; McGregor 45'; Yang 72'	Report	Morris 90'	Stadium: Celtic Park; Attendance: 58,756; Referee: John Beaton

1 March 2025	St Mirren	2–5	Celtic	Paisley
17:30 GMT	John 33'; Phillips 48'	Report	Schlupp 28'; Engels 45+1' (pen.); Yang 68', 90+3'; Maeda 88'	Stadium: St Mirren Park; Attendance: 7,127; Referee: Matthew MacDermid

16 March 2025	Celtic	2–3	Rangers	Glasgow
12:30 GMT	Maeda 49'; Hatate 74'	Report	Raskin 4'; Diomande 37'; Igamane 88'	Stadium: Celtic Park; Attendance: 58,913; Referee: Steven McLean

29 March 2025	Celtic	3–0	Heart of Midlothian	Glasgow
15:00 GMT	Maeda 17', 41'; Jota 24'	Report		Stadium: Celtic Park; Attendance: 59,062; Referee: Kevin Clancy

6 April 2025	St Johnstone	1–0	Celtic	Perth
12:00 BST	Balodis 4'	Report		Stadium: McDiarmid Park; Attendance: 8,795; Referee: David Dickinson

12 April 2025	Celtic	5–1	Kilmarnock	Glasgow
12:30 BST	Hatate 9', 24'; Maeda 11'; Carter-Vickers 21'; Ralston 90+3'	Report	Armstrong 29'	Stadium: Celtic Park; Attendance: 58,712; Referee: John Beaton

26 April 2025	Dundee United	0–5	Celtic	Dundee
12:30 BST		Report	Strain 30' (o.g.); Kühn 38', 45+3'; Idah 47', 58'	Stadium: Tannadice Park; Attendance: 13,568; Referee: Don Robertson

4 May 2025	Rangers	1–1	Celtic	Glasgow
12:00 BST	Dessers 44'	Report	Idah 57'	Stadium: Ibrox Stadium; Attendance: 49,883; Referee: Nick Walsh

10 May 2025	Celtic	3–1	Hibernian	Glasgow
15:00 BST	Kühn 41'; Idah 45'; Hatate 58'	Report	Boyle 25'	Stadium: Celtic Park; Attendance: 58,972; Referee: Colin Steven

14 May 2025	Aberdeen	1–5	Celtic	Aberdeen
19:45 BST	Nisbet 42'	Report	Nawrocki 31'; Yang 45+8'; McCowan 48'; Kenny 54'; Idah 90+4'	Stadium: Pittodrie Stadium; Attendance: 17,089; Referee: Steven McLean

17 May 2025	Celtic	1–1	St Mirren	Glasgow
12:30 BST	Forrest 90+4'	Report	Ayunga 51'	Stadium: Celtic Park; Attendance: 58,889; Referee: David Dickinson

== Scottish Cup ==
On 2 December, Celtic were drawn to face Kilmarnock at Celtic Park in the fourth round of the 2024–25 Scottish Cup. On 20 January 2025, Celtic were drawn to face Raith Rovers at Celtic Park in the fifth round. On 10 February, Celtic were drawn to face Hibernian at Celtic Park in the quarter-finals. On 10 March, Celtic were drawn to face St Johnstone in the semi-finals. Celtic faced Aberdeen in the final on 24 May.

18 January 2025 Fourth round	Celtic	2–1	Kilmarnock	Glasgow
17:30 GMT	McGregor 12'; Maeda 70'	Report	Wales 45+1'	Stadium: Celtic Park; Attendance: 40,916; Referee: Nick Walsh

8 February 2025 Fifth round	Celtic	5–0	Raith Rovers	Glasgow
17:30 GMT	Maeda 6', 45+3', 77'; McCowan 47'; Yang 56'	Report		Stadium: Celtic Park; Attendance: 39,207; Referee: Chris Graham

9 March 2025 Quarter-finals	Celtic	2–0	Hibernian	Glasgow
15:00 GMT	Maeda 39'; Idah 90+2'	Report		Stadium: Celtic Park; Attendance: 58,911; Referee: Nick Walsh

20 April 2025 Semi-finals	St Johnstone	0–5	Celtic	Glasgow
15:00 BST		Report	McGregor 34'; Maeda 37', 45+1'; Idah 45'; Jota 67'	Stadium: Hampden Park; Attendance: 43,632; Referee: Calum Scott

24 May 2025 Final	Aberdeen	1–1 (a.e.t.) (4–3 p)	Celtic	Glasgow
15:00 BST	Schmeichel 83' (o.g.)	Report	Dorrington 39' (o.g.)	Stadium: Hampden Park; Attendance: 49,545; Referee: Don Robertson
	Penalties
	Shinnie (penalty scored); Polvara (penalty scored); Dabbagh (penalty scored); Palaversa (penalty scored)		(penalty missed) McGregor; (penalty scored) Kenny; (penalty scored) McCowan; (penalty scored) Maeda; (penalty missed) Johnston

== Scottish League Cup ==
On 28 July, Celtic were drawn to face Hibernian in the second round of the 2024–25 Scottish League Cup. On 18 August, Celtic were drawn to face Falkirk in the quarter-finals. On 22 September, Celtic were drawn to face Aberdeen in the semi-finals. Celtic faced Rangers in the final on 15 December.

18 August 2024 Second round	Celtic	3–1	Hibernian	Glasgow
15:00 BST	Maeda 4', 15'; Kühn 56'	Report	Kukharevych 34'	Stadium: Celtic Park; Attendance: 47,370; Referee: Kevin Clancy

22 September 2024 Quarter-finals	Celtic	5–2	Falkirk	Glasgow
15:00 BST	Bernardo 21'; Idah 70', 72'; Kühn 81', 84'	Report	MacIver 11'; Yeats 45+1'	Stadium: Celtic Park; Attendance: 42,960; Referee: Calum Scott

2 November 2024 Semi-finals	Celtic	6–0	Aberdeen	Glasgow
17:30 GMT	Carter-Vickers 29'; Furuhashi 32'; Maeda 40', 49', 85'; Kühn 59'	Report		Stadium: Hampden Park; Attendance: 47,544; Referee: Kevin Clancy

15 December 2024 Final	Celtic	3–3 (a.e.t.) (5–4 p)	Rangers	Glasgow
15:30 GMT	Taylor 56'; Maeda 60'; Kühn 87'	Report	Bajrami 41'; Diomande 75'; Danilo 88'	Stadium: Hampden Park; Attendance: 49,420; Referee: John Beaton
	Penalties
	Idah (penalty scored); McGregor (penalty scored); Engels (penalty scored); Hatate (penalty scored); Maeda (penalty scored)		(penalty scored) Tavernier; (penalty scored) Hagi; (penalty scored) Danilo; (penalty missed) Yılmaz; (penalty scored) Butland

== UEFA Champions League ==
Celtic entered the UEFA Champions League at the league phase.

=== League phase ===
On 29 August, the draw for the league phase was made. Celtic were drawn with RB Leipzig and Borussia Dortmund (Pot 1), Club Brugge and Atalanta (Pot 2), Young Boys and Dinamo Zagreb (Pot 3), and Slovan Bratislava and Aston Villa (Pot 4).

Pos	Team	Pld	W	D	L	GF	GA	GD	Pts	Qualification
19	(Royal Dutch Football Association) Feyenoord	8	4	1	3	18	21	−3	13	Advance to knockout phase play-offs (unseeded)
20	(Italian Football Federation) Juventus	8	3	3	2	9	7	+2	12	Advance to knockout phase play-offs (unseeded)
21	(Scottish Football Association) Celtic	8	3	3	2	13	14	−1	12	Advance to knockout phase play-offs (unseeded)
22	(The Football Association) Manchester City	8	3	2	3	18	14	+4	11	Advance to knockout phase play-offs (unseeded)
23	(Portuguese Football Federation) Sporting CP	8	3	2	3	13	12	+1	11	Advance to knockout phase play-offs (unseeded)

Source: UEFA
Rules for classification: League phase tiebreakers

==== Matches ====
18 September 2024 Matchday 1	Celtic (Scotland)	5–1	(Slovakia) Slovan Bratislava	Glasgow
20:00 BST	Scales 17'; Furuhashi 47'; Engels 56' (pen.); Maeda 70'; Idah 86'	Report	Wimmer 60'	Stadium: Celtic Park; Attendance: 56,826; Referee: Danny Makkelie (Netherlands)

1 October 2024 Matchday 2	Borussia Dortmund (Germany)	7–1	(Scotland) Celtic	Dortmund, Germany
21:00 CEST	Can 7' (pen.); Adeyemi 11', 29', 42'; Guirassy 40' (pen.), 66'; Nmecha 79'	Report	Maeda 9'	Stadium: Westfalenstadion; Attendance: 81,365; Referee: José María Sánchez Martínez (Spain)

23 October 2024 Matchday 3	Atalanta (Italy)	0–0	(Scotland) Celtic	Bergamo, Italy
18:45 CEST		Report		Stadium: Stadio Atleti Azzurri d'Italia; Attendance: 21,614; Referee: Irfan Peljto (Bosnia and Herzegovina)

5 November 2024 Matchday 4	Celtic (Scotland)	3–1	(Germany) RB Leipzig	Glasgow
20:00 GMT	Kühn 35', 45+1'; Hatate 72'	Report	Baumgartner 23'	Stadium: Celtic Park; Attendance: 57,551; Referee: Benoît Bastien (France)

27 November 2024 Matchday 5	Celtic (Scotland)	1–1	(Belgium) Club Brugge	Glasgow
20:00 GMT	Maeda 60'	Report	Carter-Vickers 26' (o.g.)	Stadium: Celtic Park; Attendance: 57,456; Referee: Georgi Kabakov (Bulgaria)

10 December 2024 Matchday 6	Dinamo Zagreb (Croatia)	0–0	(Scotland) Celtic	Zagreb, Croatia
18:45 CET		Report		Stadium: Stadion Maksimir; Attendance: 18,158; Referee: Felix Zwayer (Germany)

22 January 2025 Matchday 7	Celtic (Scotland)	1–0	(Switzerland) Young Boys	Glasgow
20:00 GMT	Benito 86' (o.g.)	Report		Stadium: Celtic Park; Attendance: 56,544; Referee: Rohit Saggi (Norway)

29 January 2025 Matchday 8	Aston Villa (England)	4–2	(Scotland) Celtic	Birmingham, England
20:00 GMT	Rogers 3', 5', 90+1'; Watkins 60'	Report	Idah 36', 38'	Stadium: Villa Park; Attendance: 42,824; Referee: Clément Turpin (France)

=== Knockout phase play-offs ===
The draw for the knockout phase play-offs was held on 31 January 2025. Celtic were drawn against Bayern Munich, as a result of finishing the league phase in 21st place.

==== Matches ====
12 February 2025 First leg	Celtic (Scotland)	1–2	(Germany) Bayern Munich	Glasgow
20:00 GMT	Maeda 79'	Report	Olise 45'; Kane 49'	Stadium: Celtic Park; Attendance: 57,406; Referee: Jesús Gil Manzano (Spain)

18 February 2025 Second leg	Bayern Munich (Germany)	1–1 (3–2 agg.)	(Scotland) Celtic	Munich, Germany
21:00 CET	Davies 90+4'	Report	Kühn 63'	Stadium: Allianz Arena; Attendance: 75,000; Referee: Benoît Bastien (France)

== Statistics ==
=== Appearances and goals ===
No.	Pos	Nat	Player	Total		Premiership		Scottish Cup		League Cup		Champions League	
No.	Pos	Nat	Player	Apps	Goals	Apps	Goals	Apps	Goals	Apps	Goals	Apps	Goals
Goalkeepers
1	GK	(Denmark) DEN	Kasper Schmeichel	49	0	32	0	3	0	4	0	10	0
12	GK	(Finland) FIN	Viljami Sinisalo	8	0	6	0	2	0	0	0	0	0
29	GK	(Scotland) SCO	Scott Bain	0	0	0	0	0	0	0	0	0	0
Defenders
2	DF	(Canada) CAN	Alistair Johnston	49	4	32	4	4	0	3	0	10	0
3	DF	(Scotland) SCO	Greg Taylor	43	1	28	0	3	0	4	1	8	0
5	DF	(Republic of Ireland) IRL	Liam Scales	39	3	26	2	4	0	3	0	6	1
6	DF	(United States) USA	Auston Trusty	37	1	22	1	2	0	3	0	10	0
15	DF	(Ghana) GHA	Jeffrey Schlupp	18	1	13	1	3	0	0	0	2	0
17	DF	(Poland) POL	Maik Nawrocki	5	1	3	1	1	0	1	0	0	0
20	DF	(United States) USA	Cameron Carter-Vickers	44	2	30	1	4	0	3	1	7	0
47	DF	(Scotland) SCO	Dane Murray	2	0	0	0	1	0	0	0	1	0
56	DF	(Scotland) SCO	Anthony Ralston	23	2	16	2	2	0	2	0	3	0
Midfielders
14	MF	(Scotland) SCO	Luke McCowan	41	7	33	6	5	1	0	0	3	0
27	MF	(Belgium) BEL	Arne Engels	52	10	34	9	5	0	3	0	10	1
28	MF	(Portugal) POR	Paulo Bernardo	44	3	28	2	4	0	4	1	8	0
41	MF	(Japan) JPN	Reo Hatate	55	11	37	10	4	0	4	0	10	1
42	MF	(Scotland) SCO	Callum McGregor (captain)	54	10	35	8	5	2	4	0	10	0
49	MF	(Scotland) SCO	James Forrest	33	1	23	1	2	0	4	0	4	0
59	MF	(Scotland) SCO	Jude Bonnar	1	0	1	0	0	0	0	0	0	0
62	MF	(Scotland) SCO	Sean McArdle	2	0	2	0	0	0	0	0	0	0
66	MF	(Northern Ireland) NIR	Francis Turley	1	0	1	0	0	0	0	0	0	0
Forwards
7	FW	(Portugal) POR	Jota	16	5	11	4	3	1	0	0	2	0
9	FW	(Republic of Ireland) IRL	Adam Idah	53	20	35	13	4	2	4	2	10	3
10	FW	(Germany) GER	Nicolas Kühn	51	21	32	13	5	0	4	5	10	3
13	FW	(South Korea) KOR	Yang Hyun-jun	34	6	23	5	3	1	2	0	6	0
24	FW	(Republic of Ireland) IRL	Johnny Kenny	10	1	8	1	2	0	0	0	0	0
38	FW	(Japan) JPN	Daizen Maeda	51	33	34	16	5	7	3	6	9	4
55	FW	(Scotland) SCO	Daniel Cummings	1	0	0	0	0	0	0	0	1	0
Departures
7	FW	(Honduras) HON	Luis Palma	12	0	8	0	0	0	2	0	2	0
8	FW	(Japan) JPN	Kyōgo Furuhashi	32	12	22	10	1	0	2	1	7	1
11	DF	(Spain) ESP	Álex Valle	19	0	11	0	0	0	3	0	5	0
15	MF	(Norway) NOR	Odin Thiago Holm	3	0	3	0	0	0	0	0	0	0
33	MF	(Denmark) DEN	Matt O'Riley	3	0	2	0	0	0	1	0	0	0
57	DF	(Scotland) SCO	Stephen Welsh	2	0	1	0	0	0	1	0	0	0
90	FW	(Republic of Ireland) IRL	Mikey Johnston	1	0	1	0	0	0	0	0	0	0

Last updated: 24 May 2025
Source: Competitions

Notes

1. Player's loan ended during the season
2. Player loaned out during the season
3. Player left the club during the season

=== Goalscorers ===
R	No.	Pos.	Nation	Name	Premiership	Scottish Cup	League Cup	Champions League	Total
1	38	FW	(Japan)	Daizen Maeda	16	7	6	4	33
2	10	FW	(Germany)	Nicolas Kühn	13	0	5	3	21
3	9	FW	(Republic of Ireland)	Adam Idah	13	2	2	3	20
4	8	FW	(Japan)	Kyōgo Furuhashi	10	0	1	1	12
5	41	MF	(Japan)	Reo Hatate	10	0	0	1	11
6	27	MF	(Belgium)	Arne Engels	9	0	0	1	10
6	42	MF	(Scotland)	Callum McGregor	8	2	0	0	10
8	14	MF	(Scotland)	Luke McCowan	6	1	0	0	7
9	13	FW	(South Korea)	Yang Hyun-jun	5	1	0	0	6
10	7	FW	(Portugal)	Jota	4	1	0	0	5
11	2	DF	(Canada)	Alistair Johnston	4	0	0	0	4
12	5	DF	(Republic of Ireland)	Liam Scales	2	0	0	1	3
12	28	MF	(Portugal)	Paulo Bernardo	2	0	1	0	3
14	20	DF	(United States)	Cameron Carter-Vickers	1	0	1	0	2
14	56	DF	(Scotland)	Anthony Ralston	2	0	0	0	2
16	3	DF	(Scotland)	Greg Taylor	0	0	1	0	1
16	6	DF	(United States)	Auston Trusty	1	0	0	0	1
16	15	DF	(Ghana)	Jeffrey Schlupp	1	0	0	0	1
16	17	DF	(Poland)	Maik Nawrocki	1	0	0	0	1
16	24	FW	(Republic of Ireland)	Johnny Kenny	1	0	0	0	1
16	49	MF	(Scotland)	James Forrest	1	0	0	0	1
Own goals					2	1	0	1	4
Total					112	15	17	15	159

Last updated: 24 May 2025

=== Disciplinary record ===
Includes all competitive matches. Players listed below made at least one appearance for Celtic first squad during the season.

N	P	Nat.	Name	Premiership			Scottish Cup			League Cup			Champions League			Total			Notes
N	P	Nat.	Name	Yellow card	Second yellow card	Red card	Yellow card	Second yellow card	Red card	Yellow card	Second yellow card	Red card	Yellow card	Second yellow card	Red card	Yellow card	Second yellow card	Red card	Notes
38	FW	(Japan)	Daizen Maeda	3									1		1	4		1	
3	DF	(Scotland)	Greg Taylor	5									1			6			
10	FW	(Germany)	Nicolas Kühn	5									1			6			
2	DF	(Canada)	Alistair Johnston	3									2			5			
20	DF	(United States)	Cameron Carter-Vickers				1			2			1			4			
42	MF	(Scotland)	Callum McGregor	3						1						4			
5	DF	(Ireland)	Liam Scales	2						1						3			
28	MF	(Portugal)	Paulo Bernardo	2									1			3			
41	MF	(Japan)	Reo Hatate	2									1			3			
6	DF	(United States)	Auston Trusty	2												2			
13	FW	(South Korea)	Yang Hyun-jun	1			1									2			
27	MF	(Belgium)	Arne Engels	2												2			
1	GK	(Denmark)	Kasper Schmeichel										1			1			
8	FW	(Japan)	Kyōgo Furuhashi							1						1			
9	FW	(Ireland)	Adam Idah	1												1			
11	DF	(Spain)	Álex Valle	1												1			
14	MF	(Scotland)	Luke McCowan				1									1			
15	DF	(Ghana)	Jeffrey Schlupp				1									1			
24	FW	(Ireland)	Johnny Kenny	1												1			
56	DF	(Scotland)	Anthony Ralston										1			1			

Last updated: 24 May 2025
Source: Competitive matches
Only competitive matches
(yellow card) = Number of bookings; (second yellow card) = Number of sending offs after a second yellow card; (red card) = Number of sending offs by a direct red card.

=== Hat-tricks ===
Player	Against	Result	Date	Competition
(Japan) Daizen Maeda	(Scotland) Aberdeen	6–0 (N)	2 November 2024	League Cup
(Japan) Daizen Maeda	(Scotland) Raith Rovers	5–0 (H)	8 February 2025	Scottish Cup

(H) – Home; (A) – Away; (N) – Neutral

=== Clean sheets ===
As of 24 May 2025.

Rank	Name	Premiership	Scottish Cup	League Cup	Champions League	Total	Played Games
1	(Denmark) Kasper Schmeichel	19	1	1	3	24	49
2	(Finland) Viljami Sinisalo	2	2	0	0	4	8
Total		21	3	1	3	28	57

=== Attendances ===
As of match played 17 May 2025

	Matches	Attendances	Average	High	Low
Premiership	19	1,117,378	58,809	59,612	58,436
Scottish Cup	3	139,034	46,344	58,911	39,207
League Cup	2	90,330	45,165	47,370	42,960
Champions League	5	285,783	57,156	57,551	56,544
Total	29	1,632,525	56,293	59,612	39,207

== Team statistics ==
=== League table ===
Pos	Team	Pld	W	D	L	GF	GA	GD	Pts	Qualification or relegation (Note: Teams play each other three times (33 matches), before the league is split into two groups (the top six and the bottom six).)
1	Celtic (C)	38	29	5	4	112	26	+86	92	Qualification for the Champions League play-off round
2	Rangers	38	22	9	7	80	41	+39	75	Qualification for the Champions League second qualifying round
3	Hibernian	38	15	13	10	62	50	+12	58	Qualification for the Europa League second qualifying round
4	Dundee United	38	15	8	15	45	54	−9	53	Qualification for the Conference League second qualifying round
5	Aberdeen	38	15	8	15	48	61	−13	53	Qualification for the Europa League play-off round (Note: Aberdeen qualified for the Europa League play-off round as the 2024–25 Scottish Cup winners.)

Rules for classification: 1) Points; 2) Goal difference; 3) Goals scored; 4) Head-to-head points; 5) Head-to-head goal difference; 6) Play-off (only if deciding champion, UEFA competitions qualification, second stage group allocation or relegation).
(C) Champions

=== Competition overview ===
Competition	First match	Last match	Starting round	Final position	Record							
Competition	First match	Last match	Starting round	Final position	Pld	W	D	L	GF	GA	GD	Win %
Premiership	4 August 2024	17 May 2025	Round 1	Winners	38	29	5	4	112	26	+86	76.32
Scottish Cup	18 January 2025	24 May 2025	Fourth round	Runners-up	5	4	1	0	15	2	+13	80.00
League Cup	18 August 2024	15 December 2024	Second round	Winners	4	3	1	0	17	6	+11	75.00
Champions League	18 September 2024	18 February 2025	League phase	Knockout phase play-offs	10	3	4	3	15	17	−2	30.00
Total					57	39	11	7	159	51	+108	68.42

Source: Soccerway

== Club ==
=== Management ===
Position	Name
Manager	Brendan Rodgers
Assistant Manager	John Kennedy
First Team Coach	Adam Sadler
First Team Coach	Gavin Strachan
Goalkeeping Coach	Stevie Woods

=== Kit ===
Supplier: Adidas / Sponsors: Dafabet (front) and Magners (back)

The club is in the fifth year of a deal with Adidas – the club's official kit supplier.

Home	Away	Third

- Home: The home kit features the traditional green and white hoops with a dark green trim, and a Celtic knot collar detail. White shorts and socks complete the look.
- Away: The away kit features a yellow shirt with green hoops, and an embroidered four-leaf clover. The shirt is accompanied by green shorts and yellow socks.
- Third: The third kit features a dark green shirt with a camouflage design. The shirt is accompanied by matching shorts and socks.

== Transfers ==
=== In ===
Pos	Player	From	Type	Window	Fee
GK	(Finland) Viljami Sinisalo	(England) Aston Villa	Transfer	Summer	£1,000,000
GK	(Denmark) Kasper Schmeichel	(Belgium) Anderlecht	Transfer	Summer	Free
MF	(Portugal) Paulo Bernardo	(Portugal) Benfica	Transfer	Summer	£3,400,000
FW	(Republic of Ireland) Adam Idah	(England) Norwich City	Transfer	Summer	£8,500,000
DF	(Spain) Álex Valle	(Spain) Barcelona	Loan	Summer	Loan
DF	(United States) Auston Trusty	(England) Sheffield United	Transfer	Summer	£6,000,000
MF	(Belgium) Arne Engels	(Germany) FC Augsburg	Transfer	Summer	£11,000,000
MF	(Scotland) Luke McCowan	(Scotland) Dundee	Transfer	Summer	£1,000,000
FW	(Portugal) Jota	(France) Rennes	Transfer	Winter	£9,000,000
DF	(Ghana) Jeffrey Schlupp	(England) Crystal Palace	Loan	Winter	Loan

=== Out ===
Pos	Player	To	Type	Window	Fee
GK	(England) Joe Hart	Retired			
FW	(Montenegro) Sead Hakšabanović	(Sweden) Malmö FF	Transfer	Summer	Undisclosed
DF	(Scotland) Magnus Mackenzie	(Scotland) Queen's Park	End of contract	Summer	Free
FW	(Australia) Marco Tilio	(Australia) Melbourne City	Loan	Summer	Loan
FW	(Republic of Ireland) Rocco Vata	(England) Watford	End of contract	Summer	£237,000
FW	(South Korea) Oh Hyeon-gyu	(Belgium) Genk	Transfer	Summer	Undisclosed
GK	(Northern Ireland) Kai McLean	(Scotland) Dunfermline Athletic	End of contract	Summer	Free
GK	(Switzerland) Benjamin Siegrist	(Romania) Rapid București	Transfer	Summer	Undisclosed
MF	(Scotland) MacKenzie Carse	(Northern Ireland) Coleraine	End of contract	Summer	Free
MF	(Republic of Ireland) Ben Quinn	(England) Mansfield Town	End of contract	Summer	Free
DF	(Scotland) Dane Murray	(Scotland) Queen's Park	Loan	Summer	Loan
DF	(Republic of Ireland) Bosun Lawal	(England) Stoke City	Transfer	Summer	£2,000,000
MF	(South Korea) Kwon Hyeok-kyu	(Scotland) Hibernian	Loan	Summer	Loan
GK	(England) Tobi Oluwayemi	(Scotland) Dunfermline Athletic	Loan	Summer	Loan
MF	(Scotland) Daniel Kelly	(England) Millwall	Transfer	Summer	£400,000
DF	(Japan) Yuki Kobayashi	(Portugal) Portimonense	Transfer	Summer	Undisclosed
MF	(Denmark) Matt O'Riley	(England) Brighton & Hove Albion	Transfer	Summer	£26,000,000
DF	(Sweden) Gustaf Lagerbielke	(Netherlands) Twente	Loan	Summer	Loan
FW	(Republic of Ireland) Mikey Johnston	(England) West Bromwich Albion	Transfer	Summer	£3,000,000
MF	(Japan) Tomoki Iwata	(England) Birmingham City	Transfer	Summer	Undisclosed
DF	(Scotland) Matthew Anderson	(Austria) Admira Wacker	Loan	Summer	Loan
MF	(Scotland) Ben Summers	(Austria) Admira Wacker	Loan	Summer	Loan
MF	(England) Liam Shaw	(England) Fleetwood Town	End of contract	Summer	Free
MF	(Scotland) Benny-Jackson Luyeye	(Scotland) East Kilbride	End of contract	Summer	Free
DF	(Scotland) Stephen Welsh	(Belgium) Mechelen	Loan	Winter	Loan
DF	(Scotland) Lenny Agbaire	(Scotland) Ayr United	Loan	Winter	Loan
MF	(Norway) Odin Thiago Holm	(United States) Los Angeles FC	Loan	Winter	Loan
DF	(Argentina) Alexandro Bernabei	(Brazil) Internacional	Transfer	Winter	Undisclosed
MF	(Scotland) Aiden Haddow	(Scotland) Heart of Midlothian	Transfer	Winter	Undisclosed
FW	(Japan) Kyōgo Furuhashi	(France) Rennes	Transfer	Winter	£10,000,000
DF	(Scotland) Josh Dede	(England) Middlesbrough	Transfer	Winter	Undisclosed
FW	(Honduras) Luis Palma	(Greece) Olympiacos	Loan	Winter	Loan
DF	(Scotland) Adam Montgomery	(Scotland) Queen's Park	Loan	Winter	Loan
GK	(Scotland) Joe Morrison	(Scotland) Stenhousemuir	Loan	Winter	Loan
GK	(Northern Ireland) Josh Clarke	(Scotland) Ayr United	Loan	Winter	Loan
GK	(Scotland) Aidan Rice	(Scotland) Inverness Caledonian Thistle	Emergency Loan		
GK	(Republic of Ireland) Marcus Gill	(Scotland) Inverness Caledonian Thistle	Emergency Loan		

== See also ==
- List of Celtic F.C. seasons
