= 2024–25 UEFA Champions League league phase =

International football club competition in Europe

The 2024–25 UEFA Champions League league phase began on 17 September 2024 and ended on 29 January 2025. A total of 36 teams competed in the league phase to decide the 24 places in the knockout phase of the 2024–25 UEFA Champions League.

Aston Villa, Bologna, Brest, Girona and Slovan Bratislava made their debut appearances in the Champions League since the introduction of the group stage. Brest and Girona also made their debut appearances in European football. For the first time in their history, France had four clubs in the Champions League main stage. A total of 16 national associations were represented in the league phase.

This was the first season with the single-league format, which replaced the group format used until the previous season. With the format change, the number of matches prior to the knockout phase increased from 96 to 144. Juventus' Kenan Yıldız was the first-ever goalscorer of the competition's league phase.

== Format ==
Each team played eight matches, four at home and four away, against eight different opponents, with all 36 teams ranked in a single league table. Teams were separated into four pots based on their 2024 UEFA club coefficients, and each team played two teams from each of the four pots – one at home and one away. The top eight ranked teams received a bye to the round of 16. The teams ranked from 9th to 24th contested the knockout phase play-offs, with the teams ranked from 9th to 16th seeded for the draw. Teams ranked from 25th to 36th were eliminated from all competitions, with no access to the 2024–25 UEFA Europa League.

=== Tiebreakers ===
Teams were ranked according to points (3 points for a win, 1 point for a draw, 0 points for a loss). If two or more teams were equal on points upon completion of the league phase, the following tiebreaking criteria were applied, in the order given, to determine their rankings:

1. Goal difference;
2. Goals scored;
3. Away goals scored;
4. Wins;
5. Away wins;
6. Higher number of points obtained collectively by league phase opponents;
7. Superior collective goal difference of league phase opponents;
8. Higher number of goals scored collectively by league phase opponents;
9. Lower disciplinary points total (direct red card = 3 points, yellow card = 1 point, expulsion for two yellow cards in one match = 3 points);
10. UEFA club coefficient.

== Teams and seeding ==
The 36 teams were divided into four pots of nine teams each, with the Champions League title holders automatically placed as the top seed of pot 1. All remaining teams were allocated to pots based on their 2024 UEFA club coefficients. The participants included:

- 29 teams which entered at this stage
- 7 winners of the play-off round (5 from the Champions Path, 2 from the League Path)

Key to colours
Teams ranked 1 to 8 advanced to the round of 16 as a seeded team
Teams ranked 9 to 16 advanced to the knockout phase play-offs as a seeded team
Teams ranked 17 to 24 advanced to the knockout phase play-offs as an unseeded team

Pot 1
Team	Notes	Coeff.
(Royal Spanish Football Federation) Real Madrid		136.000
(The Football Association) Manchester City		148.000
(German Football Association) Bayern Munich		144.000
(French Football Federation) Paris Saint-Germain		116.000
(The Football Association) Liverpool		114.000
(Italian Football Federation) Inter Milan		101.000
(German Football Association) Borussia Dortmund		97.000
(German Football Association) RB Leipzig		97.000
(Royal Spanish Football Federation) Barcelona		91.000

Pot 2
Team	Notes	Coeff.
(German Football Association) Bayer Leverkusen		90.000
(Royal Spanish Football Federation) Atlético Madrid		89.000
(Italian Football Federation) Atalanta		81.000
(Italian Football Federation) Juventus		80.000
(Portuguese Football Federation) Benfica		79.000
(The Football Association) Arsenal		72.000
(Royal Belgian Football Association) Club Brugge		64.000
(Ukrainian Association of Football) Shakhtar Donetsk		63.000
(Italian Football Federation) Milan		59.000

Pot 3
Team	Notes	Coeff.
(Royal Dutch Football Association) Feyenoord		57.000
(Portuguese Football Federation) Sporting CP		54.500
(Royal Dutch Football Association) PSV Eindhoven		54.000
(Croatian Football Federation) Dinamo Zagreb		50.000
(Austrian Football Association) Red Bull Salzburg		50.000
(French Football Federation) Lille		47.000
(Football Association of Serbia) Red Star Belgrade		40.000
(Swiss Football Association) Young Boys		34.500
(Scottish Football Association) Celtic		32.000

Pot 4
Team	Notes	Coeff.
(Slovak Football Association) Slovan Bratislava		30.500
(French Football Federation) Monaco		24.000
(Football Association of the Czech Republic) Sparta Prague		22.500
(The Football Association) Aston Villa		20.860
(Italian Football Federation) Bologna		18.056
(Royal Spanish Football Federation) Girona		17.897
(German Football Association) VfB Stuttgart		17.324
(Austrian Football Association) Sturm Graz		14.500
(French Football Federation) Brest		13.366

Notes

1. ^{TH} Champions League title holders (automatic top seed of pot 1)
2. ^{EL} Europa League title holders
3. ^{CP} Winners of the play-off round (Champions Path)
4. ^{LP} Winners of play-off round (League Path)

== Draw ==
The draw for the league phase pairings was held at the Grimaldi Forum in Monaco on 29 August 2024, 18:00 CEST, with Gianluigi Buffon, the UEFA President's Awardee, and Cristiano Ronaldo as drawing guests. All 36 teams were manually drawn using physical balls. For every team manually drawn, a guest on stage pressed the button for the automated software to digitally draw their opponents at random, determining which of their matches were at home and which ones away. Each team faced two opponents from each of the four pots, one of which they faced at home and one away. Teams could not face opponents from their own association, and could only be drawn against a maximum of two sides from the same association. The draw started with Pot 1, assigning opponents to all teams, one after the other, and continued with the other pots in ascending order until all teams were assigned their opponents.

The switch to a primarily computer-based draw was made due to issues with the complexity and duration required by a manual draw. The draw software, developed by AE Live, guaranteed total randomness within the framework of the draw conditions and prevented any deadlock situations. The software was reviewed by external auditor Ernst & Young, which also provided review and control of the manual and digital draw operations on-site.

League phase opponents by club
Club	Pot 1 opponents		Pot 2 opponents		Pot 3 opponents		Pot 4 opponents		Avg coeff.
Club	Home	Away	Home	Away	Home	Away	Home	Away	Avg coeff.
(Royal Spanish Football Federation) Real Madrid	Borussia Dortmund	Liverpool	Milan	Atalanta	Red Bull Salzburg	Lille	VfB Stuttgart	Brest	59.8
(The Football Association) Manchester City	Inter Milan	Paris Saint-Germain	Club Brugge	Juventus	Feyenoord	Sporting CP	Sparta Prague	Slovan Bratislava	65.7
(German Football Association) Bayern Munich	Paris Saint-Germain	Barcelona	Benfica	Shakhtar Donetsk	Dinamo Zagreb	Feyenoord	Slovan Bratislava	Aston Villa	63.4
(French Football Federation) Paris Saint-Germain	Manchester City	Bayern Munich	Atlético Madrid	Arsenal	PSV Eindhoven	Red Bull Salzburg	Girona	VfB Stuttgart	74.0
(The Football Association) Liverpool	Real Madrid	RB Leipzig	Bayer Leverkusen	Milan	Lille	PSV Eindhoven	Bologna	Girona	64.9
(Italian Football Federation) Inter Milan	RB Leipzig	Manchester City	Arsenal	Bayer Leverkusen	Red Star Belgrade	Young Boys	Monaco	Sparta Prague	66.0
(German Football Association) Borussia Dortmund	Barcelona	Real Madrid	Shakhtar Donetsk	Club Brugge	Celtic	Dinamo Zagreb	Sturm Graz	Bologna	58.6
(German Football Association) RB Leipzig	Liverpool	Inter Milan	Juventus	Atlético Madrid	Sporting CP	Celtic	Aston Villa	Sturm Graz	63.2
(Royal Spanish Football Federation) Barcelona	Bayern Munich	Borussia Dortmund	Atalanta	Benfica	Young Boys	Red Star Belgrade	Brest	Monaco	64.1
(German Football Association) Bayer Leverkusen	Inter Milan	Liverpool	Milan	Atlético Madrid	Red Bull Salzburg	Feyenoord	Sparta Prague	Brest	63.2
(Royal Spanish Football Federation) Atlético Madrid	RB Leipzig	Paris Saint-Germain	Bayer Leverkusen	Benfica	Lille	Red Bull Salzburg	Slovan Bratislava	Sparta Prague	66.5
(Italian Football Federation) Atalanta	Real Madrid	Barcelona	Arsenal	Shakhtar Donetsk	Celtic	Young Boys	Sturm Graz	VfB Stuttgart	57.5
(Italian Football Federation) Juventus	Manchester City	RB Leipzig	Benfica	Club Brugge	PSV Eindhoven	Lille	VfB Stuttgart	Aston Villa	65.9
(Portuguese Football Federation) Benfica	Barcelona	Bayern Munich	Atlético Madrid	Juventus	Feyenoord	Red Star Belgrade	Bologna	Monaco	67.9
(The Football Association) Arsenal	Paris Saint-Germain	Inter Milan	Shakhtar Donetsk	Atalanta	Dinamo Zagreb	Sporting CP	Monaco	Girona	63.4
(Royal Belgian Football Association) Club Brugge	Borussia Dortmund	Manchester City	Juventus	Milan	Sporting CP	Celtic	Aston Villa	Sturm Graz	63.2
(Ukrainian Association of Football) Shakhtar Donetsk	Bayern Munich	Borussia Dortmund	Atalanta	Arsenal	Young Boys	PSV Eindhoven	Brest	Bologna	64.2
(Italian Football Federation) Milan	Liverpool	Real Madrid	Club Brugge	Bayer Leverkusen	Red Star Belgrade	Dinamo Zagreb	Girona	Slovan Bratislava	67.8
(Royal Dutch Football Association) Feyenoord	Bayern Munich	Manchester City	Bayer Leverkusen	Benfica	Red Bull Salzburg	Lille	Sparta Prague	Girona	74.8
(Portuguese Football Federation) Sporting CP	Manchester City	RB Leipzig	Arsenal	Club Brugge	Lille	PSV Eindhoven	Bologna	Sturm Graz	64.3
(Royal Dutch Football Association) PSV Eindhoven	Liverpool	Paris Saint-Germain	Shakhtar Donetsk	Juventus	Sporting CP	Red Star Belgrade	Girona	Brest	62.3
(Croatian Football Federation) Dinamo Zagreb	Borussia Dortmund	Bayern Munich	Milan	Arsenal	Celtic	Red Bull Salzburg	Monaco	Slovan Bratislava	63.6
(Austrian Football Association) Red Bull Salzburg	Paris Saint-Germain	Real Madrid	Atlético Madrid	Bayer Leverkusen	Dinamo Zagreb	Feyenoord	Brest	Sparta Prague	71.7
(French Football Federation) Lille	Real Madrid	Liverpool	Juventus	Atlético Madrid	Feyenoord	Sporting CP	Sturm Graz	Bologna	70.4
(Football Association of Serbia) Red Star Belgrade	Barcelona	Inter Milan	Benfica	Milan	PSV Eindhoven	Young Boys	VfB Stuttgart	Monaco	57.5
(Swiss Football Association) Young Boys	Inter Milan	Barcelona	Atalanta	Shakhtar Donetsk	Red Star Belgrade	Celtic	Aston Villa	VfB Stuttgart	55.8
(Scottish Football Association) Celtic	RB Leipzig	Borussia Dortmund	Club Brugge	Atalanta	Young Boys	Dinamo Zagreb	Slovan Bratislava	Aston Villa	59.4
(Slovak Football Association) Slovan Bratislava	Manchester City	Bayern Munich	Milan	Atlético Madrid	Dinamo Zagreb	Celtic	VfB Stuttgart	Girona	69.7
(French Football Federation) Monaco	Barcelona	Inter Milan	Benfica	Arsenal	Red Star Belgrade	Dinamo Zagreb	Aston Villa	Bologna	59.0
(Football Association of the Czech Republic) Sparta Prague	Inter Milan	Manchester City	Atlético Madrid	Bayer Leverkusen	Red Bull Salzburg	Feyenoord	Brest	VfB Stuttgart	70.7
(The Football Association) Aston Villa	Bayern Munich	RB Leipzig	Juventus	Club Brugge	Celtic	Young Boys	Bologna	Monaco	61.7
(Italian Football Federation) Bologna	Borussia Dortmund	Liverpool	Shakhtar Donetsk	Benfica	Lille	Sporting CP	Monaco	Aston Villa	62.4
(Royal Spanish Football Federation) Girona	Liverpool	Paris Saint-Germain	Arsenal	Milan	Feyenoord	PSV Eindhoven	Slovan Bratislava	Sturm Graz	64.6
(German Football Association) VfB Stuttgart	Paris Saint-Germain	Real Madrid	Atalanta	Juventus	Young Boys	Red Star Belgrade	Sparta Prague	Slovan Bratislava	67.6
(Austrian Football Association) Sturm Graz	RB Leipzig	Borussia Dortmund	Club Brugge	Atalanta	Sporting CP	Lille	Girona	Brest	59.0
(French Football Federation) Brest	Real Madrid	Barcelona	Bayer Leverkusen	Shakhtar Donetsk	PSV Eindhoven	Red Bull Salzburg	Sturm Graz	Sparta Prague	65.1

== League phase table ==
Pos	Team	Pld	W	D	L	GF	GA	GD	Pts	Qualification
1	(The Football Association) Liverpool	8	7	0	1	17	5	+12	21	Advance to round of 16 (seeded)
2	(Royal Spanish Football Federation) Barcelona	8	6	1	1	28	13	+15	19	Advance to round of 16 (seeded)
3	(The Football Association) Arsenal	8	6	1	1	16	3	+13	19	Advance to round of 16 (seeded)
4	(Italian Football Federation) Inter Milan	8	6	1	1	11	1	+10	19	Advance to round of 16 (seeded)
5	(Royal Spanish Football Federation) Atlético Madrid	8	6	0	2	20	12	+8	18	Advance to round of 16 (seeded)
6	(German Football Association) Bayer Leverkusen	8	5	1	2	15	7	+8	16	Advance to round of 16 (seeded)
7	(French Football Federation) Lille	8	5	1	2	17	10	+7	16	Advance to round of 16 (seeded)
8	(The Football Association) Aston Villa	8	5	1	2	13	6	+7	16	Advance to round of 16 (seeded)
9	(Italian Football Federation) Atalanta	8	4	3	1	20	6	+14	15	Advance to knockout phase play-offs (seeded)
10	(German Football Association) Borussia Dortmund	8	5	0	3	22	12	+10	15	Advance to knockout phase play-offs (seeded)
11	(Royal Spanish Football Federation) Real Madrid	8	5	0	3	20	12	+8	15 (Note: Tied on points (15), goal difference (+8), goals scored (20), away goals (6) and wins (5). Ranked on away wins: Real Madrid 2, Bayern Munich 1.)	Advance to knockout phase play-offs (seeded)
12	(German Football Association) Bayern Munich	8	5	0	3	20	12	+8	15	Advance to knockout phase play-offs (seeded)
13	(Italian Football Federation) Milan	8	5	0	3	14	11	+3	15	Advance to knockout phase play-offs (seeded)
14	(Royal Dutch Football Association) PSV Eindhoven	8	4	2	2	16	12	+4	14	Advance to knockout phase play-offs (seeded)
15	(French Football Federation) Paris Saint-Germain	8	4	1	3	14	9	+5	13	Advance to knockout phase play-offs (seeded)
16	(Portuguese Football Federation) Benfica	8	4	1	3	16	12	+4	13	Advance to knockout phase play-offs (seeded)
17	(French Football Federation) Monaco	8	4	1	3	13	13	0	13	Advance to knockout phase play-offs (unseeded)
18	(French Football Federation) Brest	8	4	1	3	10	11	−1	13	Advance to knockout phase play-offs (unseeded)
19	(Royal Dutch Football Association) Feyenoord	8	4	1	3	18	21	−3	13	Advance to knockout phase play-offs (unseeded)
20	(Italian Football Federation) Juventus	8	3	3	2	9	7	+2	12	Advance to knockout phase play-offs (unseeded)
21	(Scottish Football Association) Celtic	8	3	3	2	13	14	−1	12	Advance to knockout phase play-offs (unseeded)
22	(The Football Association) Manchester City	8	3	2	3	18	14	+4	11	Advance to knockout phase play-offs (unseeded)
23	(Portuguese Football Federation) Sporting CP	8	3	2	3	13	12	+1	11	Advance to knockout phase play-offs (unseeded)
24	(Royal Belgian Football Association) Club Brugge	8	3	2	3	7	11	−4	11	Advance to knockout phase play-offs (unseeded)
25	(Croatian Football Federation) Dinamo Zagreb	8	3	2	3	12	19	−7	11	
26	(German Football Association) VfB Stuttgart	8	3	1	4	13	17	−4	10	
27	(Ukrainian Association of Football) Shakhtar Donetsk	8	2	1	5	8	16	−8	7	
28	(Italian Football Federation) Bologna	8	1	3	4	4	9	−5	6	
29	(Football Association of Serbia) Red Star Belgrade	8	2	0	6	13	22	−9	6	
30	(Austrian Football Association) Sturm Graz	8	2	0	6	5	14	−9	6	
31	(Football Association of the Czech Republic) Sparta Prague	8	1	1	6	7	21	−14	4	
32	(German Football Association) RB Leipzig	8	1	0	7	8	15	−7	3	
33	(Royal Spanish Football Federation) Girona	8	1	0	7	5	13	−8	3	
34	(Austrian Football Association) Red Bull Salzburg	8	1	0	7	5	27	−22	3	
35	(Slovak Football Association) Slovan Bratislava	8	0	0	8	7	27	−20	0	
36	(Swiss Football Association) Young Boys	8	0	0	8	3	24	−21	0	

Source: UEFA
Rules for classification: League phase tiebreakers

== Results summary ==
=== By matchday ===
Matchday 1
Home team	Score	Away team
Young Boys (Switzerland)	0–3	(England) Aston Villa
Juventus (Italy)	3–1	(Netherlands) PSV Eindhoven
Milan (Italy)	1–3	(England) Liverpool
Bayern Munich (Germany)	9–2	(Croatia) Dinamo Zagreb
Real Madrid (Spain)	3–1	(Germany) VfB Stuttgart
Sporting CP (Portugal)	2–0	(France) Lille
Sparta Prague (Czech Republic)	3–0	(Austria) Red Bull Salzburg
Bologna (Italy)	0–0	(Ukraine) Shakhtar Donetsk
Celtic (Scotland)	5–1	(Slovakia) Slovan Bratislava
Club Brugge (Belgium)	0–3	(Germany) Borussia Dortmund
Manchester City (England)	0–0	(Italy) Inter Milan
Paris Saint-Germain (France)	1–0	(Spain) Girona
Feyenoord (Netherlands)	0–4	(Germany) Bayer Leverkusen
Red Star Belgrade (Serbia)	1–2	(Portugal) Benfica
Monaco (France)	2–1	(Spain) Barcelona
Atalanta (Italy)	0–0	(England) Arsenal
Atlético Madrid (Spain)	2–1	(Germany) RB Leipzig
Brest (France)	2–1	(Austria) Sturm Graz

Matchday 2
Home team	Score	Away team
Red Bull Salzburg (Austria)	0–4	(France) Brest
VfB Stuttgart (Germany)	1–1	(Czech Republic) Sparta Prague
Arsenal (England)	2–0	(France) Paris Saint-Germain
Bayer Leverkusen (Germany)	1–0	(Italy) Milan
Borussia Dortmund (Germany)	7–1	(Scotland) Celtic
Barcelona (Spain)	5–0	(Switzerland) Young Boys
Inter Milan (Italy)	4–0	(Serbia) Red Star Belgrade
PSV Eindhoven (Netherlands)	1–1	(Portugal) Sporting CP
Slovan Bratislava (Slovakia)	0–4	(England) Manchester City
Shakhtar Donetsk (Ukraine)	0–3	(Italy) Atalanta
Girona (Spain)	2–3	(Netherlands) Feyenoord
Aston Villa (England)	1–0	(Germany) Bayern Munich
Dinamo Zagreb (Croatia)	2–2	(France) Monaco
Liverpool (England)	2–0	(Italy) Bologna
Lille (France)	1–0	(Spain) Real Madrid
RB Leipzig (Germany)	2–3	(Italy) Juventus
Sturm Graz (Austria)	0–1	(Belgium) Club Brugge
Benfica (Portugal)	4–0	(Spain) Atlético Madrid

Matchday 3
Home team	Score	Away team
Milan (Italy)	3–1	(Belgium) Club Brugge
Monaco (France)	5–1	(Serbia) Red Star Belgrade
Arsenal (England)	1–0	(Ukraine) Shakhtar Donetsk
Aston Villa (England)	2–0	(Italy) Bologna
Girona (Spain)	2–0	(Slovakia) Slovan Bratislava
Juventus (Italy)	0–1	(Germany) VfB Stuttgart
Paris Saint-Germain (France)	1–1	(Netherlands) PSV Eindhoven
Real Madrid (Spain)	5–2	(Germany) Borussia Dortmund
Sturm Graz (Austria)	0–2	(Portugal) Sporting CP
Atalanta (Italy)	0–0	(Scotland) Celtic
Brest (France)	1–1	(Germany) Bayer Leverkusen
Atlético Madrid (Spain)	1–3	(France) Lille
Young Boys (Switzerland)	0–1	(Italy) Inter Milan
Barcelona (Spain)	4–1	(Germany) Bayern Munich
Red Bull Salzburg (Austria)	0–2	(Croatia) Dinamo Zagreb
Manchester City (England)	5–0	(Czech Republic) Sparta Prague
RB Leipzig (Germany)	0–1	(England) Liverpool
Benfica (Portugal)	1–3	(Netherlands) Feyenoord

Matchday 4
Home team	Score	Away team
PSV Eindhoven (Netherlands)	4–0	(Spain) Girona
Slovan Bratislava (Slovakia)	1–4	(Croatia) Dinamo Zagreb
Bologna (Italy)	0–1	(France) Monaco
Borussia Dortmund (Germany)	1–0	(Austria) Sturm Graz
Celtic (Scotland)	3–1	(Germany) RB Leipzig
Liverpool (England)	4–0	(Germany) Bayer Leverkusen
Lille (France)	1–1	(Italy) Juventus
Real Madrid (Spain)	1–3	(Italy) Milan
Sporting CP (Portugal)	4–1	(England) Manchester City
Club Brugge (Belgium)	1–0	(England) Aston Villa
Shakhtar Donetsk (Ukraine)	2–1	(Switzerland) Young Boys
Sparta Prague (Czech Republic)	1–2	(France) Brest
Inter Milan (Italy)	1–0	(England) Arsenal
Feyenoord (Netherlands)	1–3	(Austria) Red Bull Salzburg
Red Star Belgrade (Serbia)	2–5	(Spain) Barcelona
Paris Saint-Germain (France)	1–2	(Spain) Atlético Madrid
VfB Stuttgart (Germany)	0–2	(Italy) Atalanta
Bayern Munich (Germany)	1–0	(Portugal) Benfica

Matchday 5
Home team	Score	Away team
Sparta Prague (Czech Republic)	0–6	(Spain) Atlético Madrid
Slovan Bratislava (Slovakia)	2–3	(Italy) Milan
Bayer Leverkusen (Germany)	5–0	(Austria) Red Bull Salzburg
Young Boys (Switzerland)	1–6	(Italy) Atalanta
Barcelona (Spain)	3–0	(France) Brest
Bayern Munich (Germany)	1–0	(France) Paris Saint-Germain
Inter Milan (Italy)	1–0	(Germany) RB Leipzig
Manchester City (England)	3–3	(Netherlands) Feyenoord
Sporting CP (Portugal)	1–5	(England) Arsenal
Red Star Belgrade (Serbia)	5–1	(Germany) VfB Stuttgart
Sturm Graz (Austria)	1–0	(Spain) Girona
Monaco (France)	2–3	(Portugal) Benfica
Aston Villa (England)	0–0	(Italy) Juventus
Bologna (Italy)	1–2	(France) Lille
Celtic (Scotland)	1–1	(Belgium) Club Brugge
Dinamo Zagreb (Croatia)	0–3	(Germany) Borussia Dortmund
Liverpool (England)	2–0	(Spain) Real Madrid
PSV Eindhoven (Netherlands)	3–2	(Ukraine) Shakhtar Donetsk

Matchday 6
Home team	Score	Away team
Girona (Spain)	0–1	(England) Liverpool
Dinamo Zagreb (Croatia)	0–0	(Scotland) Celtic
Atalanta (Italy)	2–3	(Spain) Real Madrid
Bayer Leverkusen (Germany)	1–0	(Italy) Inter Milan
Club Brugge (Belgium)	2–1	(Portugal) Sporting CP
Red Bull Salzburg (Austria)	0–3	(France) Paris Saint‑Germain
Shakhtar Donetsk (Ukraine)	1–5	(Germany) Bayern Munich
RB Leipzig (Germany)	2–3	(England) Aston Villa
Brest (France)	1–0	(Netherlands) PSV Eindhoven
Atlético Madrid (Spain)	3–1	(Slovakia) Slovan Bratislava
Lille (France)	3–2	(Austria) Sturm Graz
Milan (Italy)	2–1	(Serbia) Red Star Belgrade
Arsenal (England)	3–0	(France) Monaco
Borussia Dortmund (Germany)	2–3	(Spain) Barcelona
Feyenoord (Netherlands)	4–2	(Czech Republic) Sparta Prague
Juventus (Italy)	2–0	(England) Manchester City
Benfica (Portugal)	0–0	(Italy) Bologna
VfB Stuttgart (Germany)	5–1	(Switzerland) Young Boys

Matchday 7
Home team	Score	Away team
Monaco (France)	1–0	(England) Aston Villa
Atalanta (Italy)	5–0	(Austria) Sturm Graz
Atlético Madrid (Spain)	2–1	(Germany) Bayer Leverkusen
Bologna (Italy)	2–1	(Germany) Borussia Dortmund
Club Brugge (Belgium)	0–0	(Italy) Juventus
Red Star Belgrade (Serbia)	2–3	(Netherlands) PSV Eindhoven
Liverpool (England)	2–1	(France) Lille
Slovan Bratislava (Slovakia)	1–3	(Germany) VfB Stuttgart
Benfica (Portugal)	4–5	(Spain) Barcelona
Shakhtar Donetsk (Ukraine)	2–0	(France) Brest
RB Leipzig (Germany)	2–1	(Portugal) Sporting CP
Milan (Italy)	1–0	(Spain) Girona
Sparta Prague (Czech Republic)	0–1	(Italy) Inter Milan
Arsenal (England)	3–0	(Croatia) Dinamo Zagreb
Celtic (Scotland)	1–0	(Switzerland) Young Boys
Feyenoord (Netherlands)	3–0	(Germany) Bayern Munich
Paris Saint-Germain (France)	4–2	(England) Manchester City
Real Madrid (Spain)	5–1	(Austria) Red Bull Salzburg

Matchday 8
Home team	Score	Away team
Aston Villa (England)	4–2	(Scotland) Celtic
Bayer Leverkusen (Germany)	2–0	(Czech Republic) Sparta Prague
Borussia Dortmund (Germany)	3–1	(Ukraine) Shakhtar Donetsk
Young Boys (Switzerland)	0–1	(Serbia) Red Star Belgrade
Barcelona (Spain)	2–2	(Italy) Atalanta
Bayern Munich (Germany)	3–1	(Slovakia) Slovan Bratislava
Inter Milan (Italy)	3–0	(France) Monaco
Red Bull Salzburg (Austria)	1–4	(Spain) Atlético Madrid
Girona (Spain)	1–2	(England) Arsenal
Dinamo Zagreb (Croatia)	2–1	(Italy) Milan
Juventus (Italy)	0–2	(Portugal) Benfica
Lille (France)	6–1	(Netherlands) Feyenoord
Manchester City (England)	3–1	(Belgium) Club Brugge
PSV Eindhoven (Netherlands)	3–2	(England) Liverpool
Sturm Graz (Austria)	1–0	(Germany) RB Leipzig
Sporting CP (Portugal)	1–1	(Italy) Bologna
Brest (France)	0–3	(Spain) Real Madrid
VfB Stuttgart (Germany)	1–4	(France) Paris Saint-Germain

=== By team ===
Results by Pot 1 team
Team	Matchday							
Team	1	2	3	4	5	6	7	8
(Spain) Real Madrid	STU (H)	LIL (A)	DOR (H)	MIL (H)	LIV (A)	ATA (A)	SAL (H)	BRE (A)
(Spain) Real Madrid	3–1	0–1	5–2	1–3	0–2	3–2	5–1	3–0
(England) Manchester City	INT (H)	SLO (A)	SPP (H)	SPO (A)	FEY (H)	JUV (A)	PAR (A)	BRU (H)
(England) Manchester City	0–0	4–0	5–0	1–4	3–3	0–2	2–4	3–1
(Germany) Bayern Munich	DZG (H)	AVL (A)	BAR (A)	BEN (H)	PAR (H)	SHK (A)	FEY (A)	SLO (H)
(Germany) Bayern Munich	9–2	0–1	1–4	1–0	1–0	5–1	0–3	3–1
(France) Paris Saint-Germain	GIR (H)	ARS (A)	PSV (H)	ATM (H)	BAY (A)	SAL (A)	MCI (H)	STU (A)
(France) Paris Saint-Germain	1–0	0–2	1–1	1–2	0–1	3–0	4–2	4–1
(England) Liverpool	MIL (A)	BOL (H)	RBL (A)	LEV (H)	RMA (H)	GIR (A)	LIL (H)	PSV (A)
(England) Liverpool	3–1	2–0	1–0	4–0	2–0	1–0	2–1	2–3
(Italy) Inter Milan	MCI (A)	RSB (H)	YB (A)	ARS (H)	RBL (H)	LEV (A)	SPP (A)	MON (H)
(Italy) Inter Milan	0–0	4–0	1–0	1–0	1–0	0–1	1–0	3–0
(Germany) Borussia Dortmund	BRU (A)	CEL (H)	RMA (A)	STM (H)	DZG (A)	BAR (H)	BOL (A)	SHK (H)
(Germany) Borussia Dortmund	3–0	7–1	2–5	1–0	3–0	2–3	1–2	3–1
(Germany) RB Leipzig	ATM (A)	JUV (H)	LIV (H)	CEL (A)	INT (A)	AVL (H)	SPO (H)	STM (A)
(Germany) RB Leipzig	1–2	2–3	0–1	1–3	0–1	2–3	2–1	0–1
(Spain) Barcelona	MON (A)	YB (H)	BAY (H)	RSB (A)	BRE (H)	DOR (A)	BEN (A)	ATA (H)
(Spain) Barcelona	1–2	5–0	4–1	5–2	3–0	3–2	5–4	2–2

Results by Pot 2 team
Team	Matchday							
Team	1	2	3	4	5	6	7	8
(Germany) Bayer Leverkusen	FEY (A)	MIL (H)	BRE (A)	LIV (A)	SAL (H)	INT (H)	ATM (A)	SPP (H)
(Germany) Bayer Leverkusen	4–0	1–0	1–1	0–4	5–0	1–0	1–2	2–0
(Spain) Atlético Madrid	RBL (H)	BEN (A)	LIL (H)	PAR (A)	SPP (A)	SLO (H)	LEV (H)	SAL (A)
(Spain) Atlético Madrid	2–1	0–4	1–3	2–1	6–0	3–1	2–1	4–1
(Italy) Atalanta	ARS (H)	SHK (A)	CEL (H)	STU (A)	YB (A)	RMA (H)	STM (H)	BAR (A)
(Italy) Atalanta	0–0	3–0	0–0	2–0	6–1	2–3	5–0	2–2
(Italy) Juventus	PSV (H)	RBL (A)	STU (H)	LIL (A)	AVL (A)	MCI (H)	BRU (A)	BEN (H)
(Italy) Juventus	3–1	3–2	0–1	1–1	0–0	2–0	0–0	0–2
(Portugal) Benfica	RSB (A)	ATM (H)	FEY (H)	BAY (A)	MON (A)	BOL (H)	BAR (H)	JUV (A)
(Portugal) Benfica	2–1	4–0	1–3	0–1	3–2	0–0	4–5	2–0
(England) Arsenal	ATA (A)	PAR (H)	SHK (H)	INT (A)	SPO (A)	MON (H)	DZG (H)	GIR (A)
(England) Arsenal	0–0	2–0	1–0	0–1	5–1	3–0	3–0	2–1
(Belgium) Club Brugge	DOR (H)	STM (A)	MIL (A)	AVL (H)	CEL (A)	SPO (H)	JUV (H)	MCI (A)
(Belgium) Club Brugge	0–3	1–0	1–3	1–0	1–1	2–1	0–0	1–3
(Ukraine) Shakhtar Donetsk	BOL (A)	ATA (H)	ARS (A)	YB (H)	PSV (A)	BAY (H)	BRE (H)	DOR (A)
(Ukraine) Shakhtar Donetsk	0–0	0–3	0–1	2–1	2–3	1–5	2–0	1–3
(Italy) Milan	LIV (H)	LEV (A)	BRU (H)	RMA (A)	SLO (A)	RSB (H)	GIR (H)	DZG (A)
(Italy) Milan	1–3	0–1	3–1	3–1	3–2	2–1	1–0	1–2

Results by Pot 3 team
Team	Matchday							
Team	1	2	3	4	5	6	7	8
(Netherlands) Feyenoord	LEV (H)	GIR (A)	BEN (A)	SAL (H)	MCI (A)	SPP (H)	BAY (H)	LIL (A)
(Netherlands) Feyenoord	0–4	3–2	3–1	1–3	3–3	4–2	3–0	1–6
(Portugal) Sporting CP	LIL (H)	PSV (A)	STM (A)	MCI (H)	ARS (H)	BRU (A)	RBL (A)	BOL (H)
(Portugal) Sporting CP	2–0	1–1	2–0	4–1	1–5	1–2	1–2	1–1
(Netherlands) PSV Eindhoven	JUV (A)	SPO (H)	PAR (A)	GIR (H)	SHK (H)	BRE (A)	RSB (A)	LIV (H)
(Netherlands) PSV Eindhoven	1–3	1–1	1–1	4–0	3–2	0–1	3–2	3–2
(Croatia) Dinamo Zagreb	BAY (A)	MON (H)	SAL (A)	SLO (A)	DOR (H)	CEL (H)	ARS (A)	MIL (H)
(Croatia) Dinamo Zagreb	2–9	2–2	2–0	4–1	0–3	0–0	0–3	2–1
(Austria) Red Bull Salzburg	SPP (A)	BRE (H)	DZG (H)	FEY (A)	LEV (A)	PAR (H)	RMA (A)	ATM (H)
(Austria) Red Bull Salzburg	0–3	0–4	0–2	3–1	0–5	0–3	1–5	1–4
(France) Lille	SPO (A)	RMA (H)	ATM (A)	JUV (H)	BOL (A)	STM (H)	LIV (A)	FEY (H)
(France) Lille	0–2	1–0	3–1	1–1	2–1	3–2	1–2	6–1
(Serbia) Red Star Belgrade	BEN (H)	INT (A)	MON (A)	BAR (H)	STU (H)	MIL (A)	PSV (H)	YB (A)
(Serbia) Red Star Belgrade	1–2	0–4	1–5	2–5	5–1	1–2	2–3	1–0
(Switzerland) Young Boys	AVL (H)	BAR (A)	INT (H)	SHK (A)	ATA (H)	STU (A)	CEL (A)	RSB (H)
(Switzerland) Young Boys	0–3	0–5	0–1	1–2	1–6	1–5	0–1	0–1
(Scotland) Celtic	SLO (H)	DOR (A)	ATA (A)	RBL (H)	BRU (H)	DZG (A)	YB (H)	AVL (A)
(Scotland) Celtic	5–1	1–7	0–0	3–1	1–1	0–0	1–0	2–4

Results by Pot 4 team
Team	Matchday							
Team	1	2	3	4	5	6	7	8
(Slovakia) Slovan Bratislava	CEL (A)	MCI (H)	GIR (A)	DZG (H)	MIL (H)	ATM (A)	STU (H)	BAY (A)
(Slovakia) Slovan Bratislava	1–5	0–4	0–2	1–4	2–3	1–3	1–3	1–3
(France) Monaco	BAR (H)	DZG (A)	RSB (H)	BOL (A)	BEN (H)	ARS (A)	AVL (H)	INT (A)
(France) Monaco	2–1	2–2	5–1	1–0	2–3	0–3	1–0	0–3
(Czech Republic) Sparta Prague	SAL (H)	STU (A)	MCI (A)	BRE (H)	ATM (H)	FEY (A)	INT (H)	LEV (A)
(Czech Republic) Sparta Prague	3–0	1–1	0–5	1–2	0–6	2–4	0–1	0–2
(England) Aston Villa	YB (A)	BAY (H)	BOL (H)	BRU (A)	JUV (H)	RBL (A)	MON (A)	CEL (H)
(England) Aston Villa	3–0	1–0	2–0	0–1	0–0	3–2	0–1	4–2
(Italy) Bologna	SHK (H)	LIV (A)	AVL (A)	MON (H)	LIL (H)	BEN (A)	DOR (H)	SPO (A)
(Italy) Bologna	0–0	0–2	0–2	0–1	1–2	0–0	2–1	1–1
(Spain) Girona	PAR (A)	FEY (H)	SLO (H)	PSV (A)	STM (A)	LIV (H)	MIL (A)	ARS (H)
(Spain) Girona	0–1	2–3	2–0	0–4	0–1	0–1	0–1	1–2
(Germany) VfB Stuttgart	RMA (A)	SPP (H)	JUV (A)	ATA (H)	RSB (A)	YB (H)	SLO (A)	PAR (H)
(Germany) VfB Stuttgart	1–3	1–1	1–0	0–2	1–5	5–1	3–1	1–4
(Austria) Sturm Graz	BRE (A)	BRU (H)	SPO (H)	DOR (A)	GIR (H)	LIL (A)	ATA (A)	RBL (H)
(Austria) Sturm Graz	1–2	0–1	0–2	0–1	1–0	2–3	0–5	1–0
(France) Brest	STM (H)	SAL (A)	LEV (H)	SPP (A)	BAR (A)	PSV (H)	SHK (A)	RMA (H)
(France) Brest	2–1	4–0	1–1	2–1	0–3	1–0	0–2	0–3

Source: UEFA
Scores and legend colours are listed from the perspective of the team in the "Team" column.
Legend: H = home, A = away. Green = win; Yellow = draw; Red = loss.

== Matches ==
The fixture list was announced on 31 August 2024, two days after the draw. This was to ensure no calendar clashes with teams in Europa League and Conference League playing in the same cities.

In principle, each team did not play more than two home matches or two away matches in a row, and played one home match and one away match across both the first and last two matchdays. The matches were played on 17–19 September (exclusive week), (Note: As part of the scheduling for the 2024–25 UEFA men's club season, each competition had an "exclusive week" in the calendar, with no other competitions scheduled during this week. For the Champions League, this took place on matchday 1 (17–19 September 2024).) 1–2 October, 22–23 October, 5–6 November, 26–27 November, 10–11 December 2024, 21–22 January and 29 January 2025. All matches were played on Tuesdays and Wednesdays, except for the competition's exclusive week, which also included Thursday fixtures. The scheduled kick-off times were 18:45 (two matches on each day) and 21:00 (remaining matches) CET/CEST. The only exception was the final matchday, where all fixtures were played simultaneously at 21:00.

Times are CET or CEST, (Note: CEST (UTC+2) for dates up to 26 October 2024 (matchdays 1–3), and CET (UTC+1) for dates thereafter (matchdays 4–8).) as listed by UEFA (local times, if different, are in parentheses).

=== Matchday 1 ===
17 September 2024
18:45

Young Boys (Swiss Football Association)	0–3	(The Football Association) Aston Villa
	Report	Tielemans 27'; Ramsey 38'; Onana 86'

Stadion Wankdorf, Bern
Attendance: 31,500
Referee: Georgi Kabakov (Bulgaria)

17 September 2024
18:45

Juventus (Italian Football Federation)	3–1	(Royal Dutch Football Association) PSV Eindhoven
Yıldız 21'; McKennie 27'; González 52'	Report	Saibari 90+3'

Juventus Stadium, Turin
Attendance: 40,417
Referee: Alejandro Hernández Hernández (Spain)

17 September 2024
21:00

Milan (Italian Football Federation)	1–3	(The Football Association) Liverpool
Pulisic 3'	Report	Konaté 23'; Van Dijk 41'; Szoboszlai 67'

San Siro, Milan
Attendance: 59,826
Referee: Espen Eskås (Norway)

17 September 2024
21:00

Bayern Munich (German Football Association)	9–2	(Croatian Football Federation) Dinamo Zagreb
Kane 19' (pen.), 57', 73' (pen.), 78' (pen.); Guerreiro 33'; Olise 38', 61'; Sané 85'; Goretzka 90+2'	Report	Petković 49'; Ogiwara 50'

Allianz Arena, Munich
Attendance: 75,000
Referee: Juan Martínez Munuera (Spain)

17 September 2024
21:00

Real Madrid (Royal Spanish Football Federation)	3–1	(German Football Association) VfB Stuttgart
Mbappé 46'; Rüdiger 83'; Endrick 90+5'	Report	Undav 68'

Santiago Bernabéu, Madrid
Attendance: 71,288
Referee: Halil Umut Meler (Turkey)

17 September 2024
21:00 (20:00 UTC+1)

Sporting CP (Portuguese Football Federation)	2–0	(French Football Federation) Lille
Gyökeres 38'; Debast 65'	Report

Estádio José Alvalade, Lisbon
Attendance: 40,024
Referee: Donatas Rumšas (Lithuania)

18 September 2024
18:45

Sparta Prague (Football Association of the Czech Republic)	3–0	(Austrian Football Association) Red Bull Salzburg
Kairinen 2'; Olatunji 42'; Laçi 58'	Report

Stadion Letná, Prague
Attendance: 17,612
Referee: Rade Obrenović (Slovenia)

18 September 2024
18:45

Bologna (Italian Football Federation)	0–0	(Ukrainian Association of Football) Shakhtar Donetsk
	Report

Stadio Renato Dall'Ara, Bologna
Attendance: 23,130
Referee: Rohit Saggi (Norway)

18 September 2024
21:00 (20:00 UTC+1)

Celtic (Scottish Football Association)	5–1	(Slovak Football Association) Slovan Bratislava
Scales 17'; Furuhashi 47'; Engels 56' (pen.); Maeda 70'; Idah 87'	Report	Wimmer 61'

Celtic Park, Glasgow
Attendance: 56,826
Referee: Danny Makkelie (Netherlands)

18 September 2024
21:00

Club Brugge (Royal Belgian Football Association)	0–3	(German Football Association) Borussia Dortmund
	Report	Gittens 76', 86'; Guirassy 90+5' (pen.)

Jan Breydel Stadium, Bruges
Attendance: 19,961
Referee: Irfan Peljto (Bosnia and Herzegovina)

18 September 2024
21:00 (20:00 UTC+1)

Manchester City (The Football Association)	0–0	(Italian Football Federation) Inter Milan
	Report

City of Manchester Stadium, Manchester
Attendance: 50,922
Referee: Glenn Nyberg (Sweden)

18 September 2024
21:00

Paris Saint-Germain (French Football Federation)	1–0	(Royal Spanish Football Federation) Girona
Gazzaniga 90' (o.g.)	Report

Parc des Princes, Paris
Attendance: 39,951
Referee: Daniel Siebert (Germany)

19 September 2024
18:45

Feyenoord (Royal Dutch Football Association)	0–4	(German Football Association) Bayer Leverkusen
	Report	Wirtz 5', 36'; Grimaldo 30'; Wellenreuther 45' (o.g.)

De Kuip, Rotterdam
Attendance: 42,297
Referee: Davide Massa (Italy)

19 September 2024
18:45

Red Star Belgrade (Football Association of Serbia)	1–2	(Portuguese Football Federation) Benfica
Milson 86'	Report	Aktürkoğlu 9'; Kökçü 29'

Red Star Stadium, Belgrade
Attendance: 44,238
Referee: Michael Oliver (England)

19 September 2024
21:00

Monaco (French Football Federation)	2–1	(Royal Spanish Football Federation) Barcelona
Akliouche 16'; Ilenikhena 71'	Report	Yamal 28'

Stade Louis II, Monaco
Attendance: 13,296
Referee: Allard Lindhout (Netherlands)

19 September 2024
21:00

Atalanta (Italian Football Federation)	0–0	(The Football Association) Arsenal
	Report

Stadio Atleti Azzurri d'Italia, Bergamo
Attendance: 22,858
Referee: Clément Turpin (France)

19 September 2024
21:00

Atlético Madrid (Royal Spanish Football Federation)	2–1	(German Football Association) RB Leipzig
Griezmann 28'; Giménez 90'	Report	Šeško 4'

Metropolitano Stadium, Madrid
Attendance: 57,856
Referee: Ivan Kružliak (Slovakia)

19 September 2024
21:00

Brest (French Football Federation)	2–1	(Austrian Football Association) Sturm Graz
Magnetti 23'; Sima 56'	Report	Fernandes 45+1' (o.g.)

Stade de Roudourou, Guingamp (Note: Brest played their home matches at Stade de Roudourou, Guingamp, instead of their regular stadium, Stade Francis-Le Blé, Brest, which did not meet UEFA requirements.)
Attendance: 14,518
Referee: Nick Walsh (Scotland)

=== Matchday 2 ===
1 October 2024
18:45

Red Bull Salzburg (Austrian Football Association)	0–4	(French Football Federation) Brest
	Report	Sima 24', 70'; Camara 66'; Pereira Lage 75'

Red Bull Arena, Salzburg
Attendance: 20,232
Referee: Anthony Taylor (England)

1 October 2024
18:45

VfB Stuttgart (German Football Association)	1–1	(Football Association of the Czech Republic) Sparta Prague
Millot 7'	Report	Kairinen 32'

MHPArena, Stuttgart
Attendance: 60,000
Referee: Manfredas Lukjančukas (Lithuania)

1 October 2024
21:00 (20:00 UTC+1)

Arsenal (The Football Association)	2–0	(French Football Federation) Paris Saint-Germain
Havertz 20'; Saka 35'	Report

Emirates Stadium, London
Attendance: 60,103
Referee: Slavko Vinčić (Slovenia)

1 October 2024
21:00

Bayer Leverkusen (German Football Association)	1–0	(Italian Football Federation) Milan
Boniface 51'	Report

BayArena, Leverkusen
Attendance: 30,210
Referee: Sandro Schärer (Switzerland)

1 October 2024
21:00

Borussia Dortmund (German Football Association)	7–1	(Scottish Football Association) Celtic
Can 7' (pen.); Adeyemi 11', 29', 42'; Guirassy 40' (pen.), 66'; Nmecha 79'	Report	Maeda 9'

Westfalenstadion, Dortmund
Attendance: 81,365
Referee: José María Sánchez Martínez (Spain)

1 October 2024
21:00

Barcelona (Royal Spanish Football Federation)	5–0	(Swiss Football Association) Young Boys
Lewandowski 8', 51'; Raphinha 34'; Martínez 37'; Camara 81' (o.g.)	Report

Estadi Olímpic Lluís Companys, Barcelona (Note: Barcelona played their home matches at Estadi Olímpic Lluís Companys, Barcelona, instead of their regular stadium, Camp Nou, Barcelona, which was being renovated.)
Attendance: 45,097
Referee: Erik Lambrechts (Belgium)

1 October 2024
21:00

Inter Milan (Italian Football Federation)	4–0	(Football Association of Serbia) Red Star Belgrade
Çalhanoğlu 11'; Arnautović 59'; L. Martínez 71'; Taremi 81' (pen.)	Report

San Siro, Milan
Attendance: 56,391
Referee: Felix Zwayer (Germany)

1 October 2024
21:00

PSV Eindhoven (Royal Dutch Football Association)	1–1	(Portuguese Football Federation) Sporting CP
Schouten 15'	Report	Bragança 84'

Philips Stadion, Eindhoven
Attendance: 34,400
Referee: Marco Guida (Italy)

1 October 2024
21:00

Slovan Bratislava (Slovak Football Association)	0–4	(The Football Association) Manchester City
	Report	Gündoğan 8'; Foden 15'; Haaland 58'; McAtee 74'

Tehelné pole, Bratislava
Attendance: 22,500
Referee: Davide Massa (Italy)

2 October 2024
18:45

Shakhtar Donetsk (Ukrainian Association of Football)	0–3	(Italian Football Federation) Atalanta
	Report	Djimsiti 21'; Lookman 44'; Bellanova 48'

Arena AufSchalke, Gelsenkirchen, Germany (Note: Due to the Russian invasion of Ukraine, Ukrainian teams were required to play their home matches at neutral venues until further notice. Therefore, Shakhtar Donetsk played their home matches at Arena AufSchalke, Gelsenkirchen, Germany, instead of their regular stadium, Donbas Arena, Donetsk.)
Attendance: 21,636
Referee: João Pinheiro (Portugal)

2 October 2024
18:45

Girona (Royal Spanish Football Federation)	2–3	(Royal Dutch Football Association) Feyenoord
D. López 19'; Van de Beek 73'	Report	Herrera 23' (o.g.); Milambo 33'; Krejčí 79' (o.g.)

Montilivi, Girona
Attendance: 8,752
Referee: Urs Schnyder (Switzerland)

2 October 2024
21:00 (20:00 UTC+1)

Aston Villa (The Football Association)	1–0	(German Football Association) Bayern Munich
Durán 79'	Report

Villa Park, Birmingham
Attendance: 38,991
Referee: Radu Petrescu (Romania)

2 October 2024
21:00

Dinamo Zagreb (Croatian Football Federation)	2–2	(French Football Federation) Monaco
Sučić 45+3'; Baturina 66'	Report	Salisu 74'; Zakaria 90' (pen.)

Stadion Maksimir, Zagreb
Attendance: 12,462
Referee: Harm Osmers (Germany)

2 October 2024
21:00 (20:00 UTC+1)

Liverpool (The Football Association)	2–0	(Italian Football Federation) Bologna
Mac Allister 11'; Salah 75'	Report

Anfield, Liverpool
Attendance: 59,816
Referee: Nikola Dabanović (Montenegro)

2 October 2024
21:00

Lille (French Football Federation)	1–0	(Royal Spanish Football Federation) Real Madrid
David 45+3' (pen.)	Report

Stade Pierre-Mauroy, Villeneuve-d'Ascq
Attendance: 48,205
Referee: Maurizio Mariani (Italy)

2 October 2024
21:00

RB Leipzig (German Football Association)	2–3	(Italian Football Federation) Juventus
Šeško 30', 65' (pen.)	Report	Vlahović 50', 68'; Conceição 82'

Red Bull Arena, Leipzig
Attendance: 45,228
Referee: François Letexier (France)

2 October 2024
21:00

Sturm Graz (Austrian Football Association)	0–1	(Royal Belgian Football Association) Club Brugge
	Report	Tzolis 23'

Wörthersee Stadion, Klagenfurt (Note: Sturm Graz played their home matches at Wörthersee Stadion, Klagenfurt, instead of their regular stadium, Liebenauer Stadium, Graz, which did not meet UEFA requirements.)
Attendance: 23,205
Referee: Aliyar Aghayev (Azerbaijan)

2 October 2024
21:00 (20:00 UTC+1)

Benfica (Portuguese Football Federation)	4–0	(Royal Spanish Football Federation) Atlético Madrid
Aktürkoğlu 13'; Di María 52' (pen.); Bah 75'; Kökçü 84' (pen.)	Report

Estádio da Luz, Lisbon
Attendance: 62,028
Referee: Serdar Gözübüyük (Netherlands)

=== Matchday 3 ===
22 October 2024
18:45

Milan (Italian Football Federation)	3–1	(Royal Belgian Football Association) Club Brugge
Pulisic 34'; Reijnders 61', 71'	Report	Sabbe 51'

San Siro, Milan
Attendance: 58,649
Referee: Felix Zwayer (Germany)

22 October 2024
18:45

Monaco (French Football Federation)	5–1	(Football Association of Serbia) Red Star Belgrade
Minamino 20', 70'; Embolo 45+4'; Singo 54'; Akliouche 90+7'	Report	Ndiaye 27' (pen.)

Stade Louis II, Monaco
Attendance: 9,590
Referee: Tobias Stieler (Germany)

22 October 2024
21:00 (20:00 UTC+1)

Arsenal (The Football Association)	1–0	(Ukrainian Association of Football) Shakhtar Donetsk
Riznyk 29' (o.g.)	Report

Emirates Stadium, London
Attendance: 59,594
Referee: Benoît Bastien (France)

22 October 2024
21:00 (20:00 UTC+1)

Aston Villa (The Football Association)	2–0	(Italian Football Federation) Bologna
McGinn 55'; Durán 64'	Report

Villa Park, Birmingham
Attendance: 41,847
Referee: João Pinheiro (Portugal)

22 October 2024
21:00

Girona (Royal Spanish Football Federation)	2–0	(Slovak Football Association) Slovan Bratislava
Gutiérrez 42'; Juanpe 73'	Report

Montilivi, Girona
Attendance: 9,246
Referee: Horațiu Feșnic (Romania)

22 October 2024
21:00

Juventus (Italian Football Federation)	0–1	(German Football Association) VfB Stuttgart
	Report	Touré 90+2'

Juventus Stadium, Turin
Attendance: 41,306
Referee: Espen Eskås (Norway)

22 October 2024
21:00

Paris Saint-Germain (French Football Federation)	1–1	(Royal Dutch Football Association) PSV Eindhoven
Hakimi 55'	Report	Lang 34'

Parc des Princes, Paris
Attendance: 47,511
Referee: Glenn Nyberg (Sweden)

22 October 2024
21:00

Real Madrid (Royal Spanish Football Federation)	5–2	(German Football Association) Borussia Dortmund
Rüdiger 60'; Vinícius 62', 86', 90+3'; Vázquez 83'	Report	Malen 30'; Gittens 34'

Santiago Bernabéu, Madrid
Attendance: 74,642
Referee: István Kovács (Romania)

22 October 2024
21:00

Sturm Graz (Austrian Football Association)	0–2	(Portuguese Football Federation) Sporting CP
	Report	Santos 23'; Gyökeres 53'

Wörthersee Stadion, Klagenfurt
Attendance: 23,691
Referee: Giorgi Kruashvili (Georgia)

23 October 2024
18:45

Atalanta (Italian Football Federation)	0–0	(Scottish Football Association) Celtic
	Report

Stadio Atleti Azzurri d'Italia, Bergamo
Attendance: 21,614
Referee: Irfan Peljto (Bosnia and Herzegovina)

23 October 2024
18:45

Brest (French Football Federation)	1–1	(German Football Association) Bayer Leverkusen
Lees-Melou 39'	Report	Wirtz 24'

Stade de Roudourou, Guingamp
Attendance: 15,510
Referee: Ivan Kružliak (Slovakia)

23 October 2024
21:00

Atlético Madrid (Royal Spanish Football Federation)	1–3	(French Football Federation) Lille
Alvarez 8'	Report	Zhegrova 61'; David 74' (pen.), 89'

Metropolitano Stadium, Madrid
Attendance: 61,197
Referee: Marco Guida (Italy)

23 October 2024
21:00

Young Boys (Swiss Football Association)	0–1	(Italian Football Federation) Inter Milan
	Report	Thuram 90+3'

Stadion Wankdorf, Bern
Attendance: 31,500
Referee: Michael Oliver (England)

23 October 2024
21:00

Barcelona (Royal Spanish Football Federation)	4–1	(German Football Association) Bayern Munich
Raphinha 1', 45', 56'; Lewandowski 36'	Report	Kane 18'

Estadi Olímpic Lluís Companys, Barcelona
Attendance: 50,312
Referee: Slavko Vinčić (Slovenia)

23 October 2024
21:00

Red Bull Salzburg (Austrian Football Association)	0–2	(Croatian Football Federation) Dinamo Zagreb
	Report	Kulenović 49'; Petković 84'

Red Bull Arena, Salzburg
Attendance: 24,018
Referee: Danny Makkelie (Netherlands)

23 October 2024
21:00 (20:00 UTC+1)

Manchester City (The Football Association)	5–0	(Football Association of the Czech Republic) Sparta Prague
Foden 3'; Haaland 58', 68'; Stones 64'; Nunes 88' (pen.)	Report

City of Manchester Stadium, Manchester
Attendance: 50,116
Referee: Maurizio Mariani (Italy)

23 October 2024
21:00

RB Leipzig (German Football Association)	0–1	(The Football Association) Liverpool
	Report	Núñez 27'

Red Bull Arena, Leipzig
Attendance: 45,228
Referee: Sandro Schärer (Switzerland)

23 October 2024
21:00 (20:00 UTC+1)

Benfica (Portuguese Football Federation)	1–3	(Royal Dutch Football Association) Feyenoord
Aktürkoğlu 66'	Report	Ueda 12'; Milambo 33', 90+2'

Estádio da Luz, Lisbon
Attendance: 61,687
Referee: Halil Umut Meler (Turkey)

=== Matchday 4 ===
5 November 2024
18:45

PSV Eindhoven (Royal Dutch Football Association)	4–0	(Royal Spanish Football Federation) Girona
Flamingo 16'; Tillman 33'; Bakayoko 83'; Krejčí 88' (o.g.)	Report

Philips Stadion, Eindhoven
Attendance: 34,400
Referee: Michael Oliver (England)

5 November 2024
18:45

Slovan Bratislava (Slovak Football Association)	1–4	(Croatian Football Federation) Dinamo Zagreb
Strelec 5'	Report	Špikić 10'; Sučić 30'; Kulenović 54', 72'

Tehelné pole, Bratislava
Attendance: 22,132
Referee: Anthony Taylor (England)

5 November 2024
21:00

Bologna (Italian Football Federation)	0–1	(French Football Federation) Monaco
	Report	Kehrer 86'

Stadio Renato Dall'Ara, Bologna
Attendance: 23,084
Referee: Aliyar Aghayev (Azerbaijan)

5 November 2024
21:00

Borussia Dortmund (German Football Association)	1–0	(Austrian Football Association) Sturm Graz
Malen 85'	Report

Westfalenstadion, Dortmund
Attendance: 81,365
Referee: Erik Lambrechts (Belgium)

5 November 2024
21:00 (20:00 UTC+0)

Celtic (Scottish Football Association)	3–1	(German Football Association) RB Leipzig
Kühn 35', 45+1'; Hatate 72'	Report	Baumgartner 23'

Celtic Park, Glasgow
Attendance: 57,551
Referee: Benoît Bastien (France)

5 November 2024
21:00 (20:00 UTC+0)

Liverpool (The Football Association)	4–0	(German Football Association) Bayer Leverkusen
Díaz 61', 83', 90+2'; Gakpo 63'	Report

Anfield, Liverpool
Attendance: 59,790
Referee: Danny Makkelie (Netherlands)

5 November 2024
21:00

Lille (French Football Federation)	1–1	(Italian Football Federation) Juventus
David 27'	Report	Vlahović 60' (pen.)

Stade Pierre-Mauroy, Villeneuve-d'Ascq
Attendance: 48,312
Referee: Irfan Peljto (Bosnia and Herzegovina)

5 November 2024
21:00

Real Madrid (Royal Spanish Football Federation)	1–3	(Italian Football Federation) Milan
Vinícius 23' (pen.)	Report	Thiaw 12'; Morata 39'; Reijnders 73'

Santiago Bernabéu, Madrid
Attendance: 75,561
Referee: Slavko Vinčić (Slovenia)

5 November 2024
21:00 (20:00 UTC+0)

Sporting CP (Portuguese Football Federation)	4–1	(The Football Association) Manchester City
Gyökeres 38', 49' (pen.), 81' (pen.); Araújo 46'	Report	Foden 4'

Estádio José Alvalade, Lisbon
Attendance: 47,453
Referee: Daniel Siebert (Germany)

6 November 2024
18:45

Club Brugge (Royal Belgian Football Association)	1–0	(The Football Association) Aston Villa
Vanaken 52' (pen.)	Report

Jan Breydel Stadium, Bruges
Attendance: 23,466
Referee: Tobias Stieler (Germany)

6 November 2024
18:45

Shakhtar Donetsk (Ukrainian Association of Football)	2–1	(Swiss Football Association) Young Boys
Zubkov 31'; Sudakov 41'	Report	Imeri 27'

Arena AufSchalke, Gelsenkirchen, Germany
Attendance: 17,420
Referee: Orel Grinfeld (Israel)

6 November 2024
21:00

Sparta Prague (Football Association of the Czech Republic)	1–2	(French Football Federation) Brest
Olatunji 90+2'	Report	Fernandes 37'; Kairinen 80' (o.g.)

Stadion Letná, Prague
Attendance: 18,033
Referee: Mykola Balakin (Ukraine)

6 November 2024
21:00

Inter Milan (Italian Football Federation)	1–0	(The Football Association) Arsenal
Çalhanoğlu 45+3' (pen.)	Report

San Siro, Milan
Attendance: 75,222
Referee: István Kovács (Romania)

6 November 2024
21:00

Feyenoord (Royal Dutch Football Association)	1–3	(Austrian Football Association) Red Bull Salzburg
Hadj Moussa 80'	Report	Konaté 45+2', 58'; Guindo 86'

De Kuip, Rotterdam
Attendance: 42,774
Referee: Donatas Rumšas (Lithuania)

6 November 2024
21:00

Red Star Belgrade (Football Association of Serbia)	2–5	(Royal Spanish Football Federation) Barcelona
Silas 27'; Milson 84'	Report	Martínez 13'; Lewandowski 43', 53'; Raphinha 55'; López 76'

Red Star Stadium, Belgrade
Attendance: 48,886
Referee: Espen Eskås (Norway)

6 November 2024
21:00

Paris Saint-Germain (French Football Federation)	1–2	(Royal Spanish Football Federation) Atlético Madrid
Zaïre-Emery 14'	Report	Molina 18'; Correa 90+3'

Parc des Princes, Paris
Attendance: 47,369
Referee: Szymon Marciniak (Poland)

6 November 2024
21:00

VfB Stuttgart (German Football Association)	0–2	(Italian Football Federation) Atalanta
	Report	Lookman 51'; Zaniolo 88'

MHPArena, Stuttgart
Attendance: 60,000
Referee: Rade Obrenović (Slovenia)

6 November 2024
21:15 (Note: The Bayern Munich v Benfica match, originally scheduled for 21:00, was delayed to 21:15 to allow fans time to get into the stadium following public transport issues.)

Bayern Munich (German Football Association)	1–0	(Portuguese Football Federation) Benfica
Musiala 67'	Report

Allianz Arena, Munich
Attendance: 75,000
Referee: Davide Massa (Italy)

=== Matchday 5 ===
26 November 2024
18:45

Sparta Prague (Football Association of the Czech Republic)	0–6	(Royal Spanish Football Federation) Atlético Madrid
	Report	Alvarez 15', 59'; Llorente 43'; Griezmann 70'; Correa 85', 89'

Stadion Letná, Prague
Attendance: 18,110
Referee: Danny Makkelie (Netherlands)

26 November 2024
18:45

Slovan Bratislava (Slovak Football Association)	2–3	(Italian Football Federation) Milan
Barseghyan 24'; Marcelli 88'	Report	Pulisic 21'; Leão 68'; Abraham 71'

Tehelné pole, Bratislava
Attendance: 22,500
Referee: José María Sánchez Martínez (Spain)

26 November 2024
21:00

Bayer Leverkusen (German Football Association)	5–0	(Austrian Football Association) Red Bull Salzburg
Wirtz 8' (pen.), 30'; Grimaldo 11'; Schick 61'; García 72'	Report

BayArena, Leverkusen
Attendance: 29,211
Referee: Mykola Balakin (Ukraine)

26 November 2024
21:00

Young Boys (Swiss Football Association)	1–6	(Italian Football Federation) Atalanta
Ganvoula 11'	Report	Retegui 9', 39'; De Ketelaere 28', 56'; Kolašinac 32'; Samardžić 90'

Stadion Wankdorf, Bern
Attendance: 31,500
Referee: Manfredas Lukjančukas (Lithuania)

26 November 2024
21:00

Barcelona (Royal Spanish Football Federation)	3–0	(French Football Federation) Brest
Lewandowski 10' (pen.), 90+2'; Olmo 66'	Report

Estadi Olímpic Lluís Companys, Barcelona
Attendance: 46,317
Referee: Irfan Peljto (Bosnia and Herzegovina)

26 November 2024
21:00

Bayern Munich (German Football Association)	1–0	(French Football Federation) Paris Saint-Germain
Kim Min-jae 38'	Report

Allianz Arena, Munich
Attendance: 75,000
Referee: István Kovács (Romania)

26 November 2024
21:00

Inter Milan (Italian Football Federation)	1–0	(German Football Association) RB Leipzig
Lukeba 27' (o.g.)	Report

San Siro, Milan
Attendance: 63,174
Referee: João Pinheiro (Portugal)

26 November 2024
21:00 (20:00 UTC+0)

Manchester City (The Football Association)	3–3	(Royal Dutch Football Association) Feyenoord
Haaland 44' (pen.), 53'; Gündoğan 50'	Report	Hadj Moussa 75'; Giménez 82'; Hancko 89'

City of Manchester Stadium, Manchester
Attendance: 47,011
Referee: Radu Petrescu (Romania)

26 November 2024
21:00 (20:00 UTC+0)

Sporting CP (Portuguese Football Federation)	1–5	(The Football Association) Arsenal
Inácio 47'	Report	Martinelli 7'; Havertz 22'; Gabriel 45+1'; Saka 65' (pen.); Trossard 82'

Estádio José Alvalade, Lisbon
Attendance: 47,386
Referee: Szymon Marciniak (Poland)

27 November 2024
18:45

Red Star Belgrade (Football Association of Serbia)	5–1	(German Football Association) VfB Stuttgart
Silas 12'; Krunić 31'; Ivanić 65'; Radonjić 69', 88'	Report	Demirović 5'

Red Star Stadium, Belgrade
Attendance: 41,372
Referee: Erik Lambrechts (Belgium)

27 November 2024
18:45

Sturm Graz (Austrian Football Association)	1–0	(Royal Spanish Football Federation) Girona
Biereth 59'	Report

Wörthersee Stadion, Klagenfurt
Attendance: 21,502
Referee: Rohit Saggi (Norway)

27 November 2024
21:00

Monaco (French Football Federation)	2–3	(Portuguese Football Federation) Benfica
Ben Seghir 13'; Magassa 67'	Report	Pavlidis 48'; Cabral 84'; Amdouni 88'

Stade Louis II, Monaco
Attendance: 13,581
Referee: Rade Obrenovič (Slovenia)

27 November 2024
21:00 (20:00 UTC+0)

Aston Villa (The Football Association)	0–0	(Italian Football Federation) Juventus
	Report

Villa Park, Birmingham
Attendance: 42,589
Referee: Jesús Gil Manzano (Spain)

27 November 2024
21:00

Bologna (Italian Football Federation)	1–2	(French Football Federation) Lille
Lucumí 63'	Report	Mukau 44', 66'

Stadio Renato Dall'Ara, Bologna
Attendance: 22,420
Referee: Michael Oliver (England)

27 November 2024
21:00 (20:00 UTC+0)

Celtic (Scottish Football Association)	1–1	(Royal Belgian Football Association) Club Brugge
Maeda 60'	Report	Carter-Vickers 26' (o.g.)

Celtic Park, Glasgow
Attendance: 57,456
Referee: Georgi Kabakov (Bulgaria)

27 November 2024
21:00

Dinamo Zagreb (Croatian Football Federation)	0–3	(German Football Association) Borussia Dortmund
	Report	Gittens 41'; Bensebaini 56'; Guirassy 90'

Stadion Maksimir, Zagreb
Attendance: 20,019
Referee: Clément Turpin (France)

27 November 2024
21:00 (20:00 UTC+0)

Liverpool (The Football Association)	2–0	(Royal Spanish Football Federation) Real Madrid
Mac Allister 52'; Gakpo 76'	Report

Anfield, Liverpool
Attendance: 59,546
Referee: François Letexier (France)

27 November 2024
21:00

PSV Eindhoven (Royal Dutch Football Association)	3–2	(Ukrainian Association of Football) Shakhtar Donetsk
Tillman 87', 90'; Pepi 90+5'	Report	Sikan 8'; Zubkov 37'

Philips Stadion, Eindhoven
Attendance: 35,100
Referee: Urs Schnyder (Switzerland)

=== Matchday 6 ===
10 December 2024
18:45

Girona (Royal Spanish Football Federation)	0–1	(The Football Association) Liverpool
	Report	Salah 63' (pen.)

Montilivi, Girona
Attendance: 9,241
Referee: Benoît Bastien (France)

10 December 2024
18:45

Dinamo Zagreb (Croatian Football Federation)	0–0	(Scottish Football Association) Celtic
	Report

Stadion Maksimir, Zagreb
Attendance: 18,158
Referee: Felix Zwayer (Germany)

10 December 2024
21:00

Atalanta (Italian Football Federation)	2–3	(Royal Spanish Football Federation) Real Madrid
De Ketelaere 45+2' (pen.); Lookman 65'	Report	Mbappé 10'; Vinícius 56'; Bellingham 59'

Stadio Atleti Azzurri d'Italia, Bergamo
Attendance: 22,967
Referee: Szymon Marciniak (Poland)

10 December 2024
21:00

Bayer Leverkusen (German Football Association)	1–0	(Italian Football Federation) Inter Milan
Mukiele 90'	Report

BayArena, Leverkusen
Attendance: 30,210
Referee: Slavko Vinčić (Slovenia)

10 December 2024
21:00

Club Brugge (Royal Belgian Football Association)	2–1	(Portuguese Football Federation) Sporting CP
Quaresma 24' (o.g.); Nielsen 84'	Report	Catamo 3'

Jan Breydel Stadium, Bruges
Attendance: 22,254
Referee: Anthony Taylor (England)

10 December 2024
21:00

Red Bull Salzburg (Austrian Football Association)	0–3	(French Football Federation) Paris Saint-Germain
	Report	Ramos 30'; Mendes 72'; Doué 85'

Red Bull Arena, Salzburg
Attendance: 25,065
Referee: Michael Oliver (England)

10 December 2024
21:00

Shakhtar Donetsk (Ukrainian Association of Football)	1–5	(German Football Association) Bayern Munich
Kevin 5'	Report	Laimer 11'; Müller 45'; Olise 70' (pen.), 90+3'; Musiala 87'

Arena AufSchalke, Gelsenkirchen, Germany
Attendance: 57,079
Referee: Halil Umut Meler (Turkey)

10 December 2024
21:00

RB Leipzig (German Football Association)	2–3	(The Football Association) Aston Villa
Openda 27'; Baumgartner 62'	Report	McGinn 3'; Durán 52'; Barkley 85'

Red Bull Arena, Leipzig
Attendance: 40,406
Referee: Maurizio Mariani (Italy)

10 December 2024
21:00

Brest (French Football Federation)	1–0	(Royal Dutch Football Association) PSV Eindhoven
Le Cardinal 43'	Report

Stade de Roudourou, Guingamp
Attendance: 15,778
Referee: José María Sánchez Martínez (Spain)

11 December 2024
18:45

Atlético Madrid (Royal Spanish Football Federation)	3–1	(Slovak Football Association) Slovan Bratislava
Alvarez 16'; Griezmann 42', 57'	Report	Strelec 51' (pen.)

Metropolitano Stadium, Madrid
Attendance: 59,134
Referee: Manfredas Lukjančukas (Lithuania)

11 December 2024
18:45

Lille (French Football Federation)	3–2	(Austrian Football Association) Sturm Graz
Sahraoui 37'; Bakker 45+2'; Haraldsson 81'	Report	Kiteishvili 45+4'; Biereth 47'

Stade Pierre-Mauroy, Villeneuve-d'Ascq
Attendance: 45,796
Referee: Georgi Kabakov (Bulgaria)

11 December 2024
21:00

Milan (Italian Football Federation)	2–1	(Football Association of Serbia) Red Star Belgrade
Leão 42'; Abraham 87'	Report	Radonjić 67'

San Siro, Milan
Attendance: 53,717
Referee: Jesús Gil Manzano (Spain)

11 December 2024
21:00 (20:00 UTC+0)

Arsenal (The Football Association)	3–0	(French Football Federation) Monaco
Saka 34', 78'; Havertz 88'	Report

Emirates Stadium, London
Attendance: 60,157
Referee: Davide Massa (Italy)

11 December 2024
21:00

Borussia Dortmund (German Football Association)	2–3	(Royal Spanish Football Federation) Barcelona
Guirassy 60' (pen.), 78'	Report	Raphinha 53'; Torres 75', 85'

Westfalenstadion, Dortmund
Attendance: 81,365
Referee: François Letexier (France)

11 December 2024
21:00

Feyenoord (Royal Dutch Football Association)	4–2	(Football Association of the Czech Republic) Sparta Prague
Trauner 8'; Paixão 10'; Hadj Moussa 30'; Giménez 63'	Report	Rrahmani 43'; Beelen 79' (o.g.)

De Kuip, Rotterdam
Attendance: 45,000
Referee: Tobias Stieler (Germany)

11 December 2024
21:00

Juventus (Italian Football Federation)	2–0	(The Football Association) Manchester City
Vlahović 53'; McKennie 75'	Report

Juventus Stadium, Turin
Attendance: 40,890
Referee: Clément Turpin (France)

11 December 2024
21:00 (20:00 UTC+0)

Benfica (Portuguese Football Federation)	0–0	(Italian Football Federation) Bologna
	Report

Estádio da Luz, Lisbon
Attendance: 60,650
Referee: Radu Petrescu (Romania)

11 December 2024
21:00

VfB Stuttgart (German Football Association)	5–1	(Swiss Football Association) Young Boys
Stiller 25'; Millot 53'; Führich 61'; Vagnoman 66'; Keitel 75'	Report	Łakomy 6'

MHPArena, Stuttgart
Attendance: 60,000
Referee: Giorgi Kruashvili (Georgia)

=== Matchday 7 ===
21 January 2025
18:45

Monaco (French Football Federation)	1–0	(The Football Association) Aston Villa
Singo 8'	Report

Stade Louis II, Monaco
Attendance: 13,508
Referee: Slavko Vinčić (Slovenia)

21 January 2025
18:45

Atalanta (Italian Football Federation)	5–0	(Austrian Football Association) Sturm Graz
Retegui 12'; Pašalić 58'; De Ketelaere 63'; Lookman 90'; Brescianini 90+4'	Report

Stadio Atleti Azzurri d'Italia, Bergamo
Attendance: 19,469
Referee: Donatas Rumšas (Lithuania)

21 January 2025
21:00

Atlético Madrid (Royal Spanish Football Federation)	2–1	(German Football Association) Bayer Leverkusen
Alvarez 52', 90'	Report	Hincapié 45+1'

Metropolitano Stadium, Madrid
Attendance: 66,820
Referee: Davide Massa (Italy)

21 January 2025
21:00

Bologna (Italian Football Federation)	2–1	(German Football Association) Borussia Dortmund
Dallinga 71'; Iling-Junior 72'	Report	Guirassy 15' (pen.)

Stadio Renato Dall'Ara, Bologna
Attendance: 26,801
Referee: Serdar Gözübüyük (Netherlands)

21 January 2025
21:00

Club Brugge (Royal Belgian Football Association)	0–0	(Italian Football Federation) Juventus
	Report

Jan Breydel Stadium, Bruges
Attendance: 26,700
Referee: Benoît Bastien (France)

21 January 2025
21:00

Red Star Belgrade (Football Association of Serbia)	2–3	(Royal Dutch Football Association) PSV Eindhoven
Ndiaye 71'; Djiga 77'	Report	De Jong 17', 23'; Flamingo 43'

Red Star Stadium, Belgrade
Attendance: 36,648
Referee: István Kovács (Romania)

21 January 2025
21:00 (20:00 UTC+0)

Liverpool (The Football Association)	2–1	(French Football Federation) Lille
Salah 34'; Elliott 67'	Report	David 62'

Anfield, Liverpool
Attendance: 59,782
Referee: Felix Zwayer (Germany)

21 January 2025
21:00

Slovan Bratislava (Slovak Football Association)	1–3	(German Football Association) VfB Stuttgart
Metsoko 85'	Report	Leweling 11', 36'; Rieder 87'

Tehelné pole, Bratislava
Attendance: 22,500
Referee: Chris Kavanagh (England)

21 January 2025
21:00 (20:00 UTC+0)

Benfica (Portuguese Football Federation)	4–5	(Royal Spanish Football Federation) Barcelona
Pavlidis 2', 22', 30' (pen.); Araújo 68' (o.g.)	Report	Lewandowski 13' (pen.), 78' (pen.); Raphinha 64', 90+6'; García 86'

Estádio da Luz, Lisbon
Attendance: 63,225
Referee: Danny Makkelie (Netherlands)

22 January 2025
18:45

Shakhtar Donetsk (Ukrainian Association of Football)	2–0	(French Football Federation) Brest
Kevin 18'; Sudakov 37' (pen.)	Report

Arena AufSchalke, Gelsenkirchen, Germany
Attendance: 15,282
Referee: Sandro Schärer (Switzerland)

22 January 2025
18:45

RB Leipzig (German Football Association)	2–1	(Portuguese Football Federation) Sporting CP
Šeško 19'; Poulsen 78'	Report	Gyökeres 75'

Red Bull Arena, Leipzig
Attendance: 33,478
Referee: Manfredas Lukjančukas (Lithuania)

22 January 2025
21:00

Milan (Italian Football Federation)	1–0	(Royal Spanish Football Federation) Girona
Leão 37'	Report

San Siro, Milan
Attendance: 66,030
Referee: Tobias Stieler (Germany)

22 January 2025
21:00

Sparta Prague (Football Association of the Czech Republic)	0–1	(Italian Football Federation) Inter Milan
	Report	L. Martínez 12'

Stadion Letná, Prague
Attendance: 18,010
Referee: Alejandro Hernández Hernández (Spain)

22 January 2025
21:00 (20:00 UTC+0)

Arsenal (The Football Association)	3–0	(Croatian Football Federation) Dinamo Zagreb
Rice 2'; Havertz 66'; Ødegaard 90+1'	Report

Emirates Stadium, London
Attendance: 60,024
Referee: Daniel Siebert (Germany)

22 January 2025
21:00 (20:00 UTC+0)

Celtic (Scottish Football Association)	1–0	(Swiss Football Association) Young Boys
Benito 86' (o.g.)	Report

Celtic Park, Glasgow
Attendance: 56,544
Referee: Rohit Saggi (Norway)

22 January 2025
21:00

Feyenoord (Royal Dutch Football Association)	3–0	(German Football Association) Bayern Munich
Giménez 21', 45+9' (pen.); Ueda 89'	Report

De Kuip, Rotterdam
Attendance: 43,106
Referee: François Letexier (France)

22 January 2025
21:00

Paris Saint-Germain (French Football Federation)	4–2	(The Football Association) Manchester City
Dembélé 56'; Barcola 60'; Neves 78'; Ramos 90+3'	Report	Grealish 50'; Haaland 53'

Parc des Princes, Paris
Attendance: 47,818
Referee: Szymon Marciniak (Poland)

22 January 2025
21:00

Real Madrid (Royal Spanish Football Federation)	5–1	(Austrian Football Association) Red Bull Salzburg
Rodrygo 23', 34'; Mbappé 48'; Vinícius 55', 77'	Report	Bidstrup 85'

Santiago Bernabéu, Madrid
Attendance: 73,692
Referee: Glenn Nyberg (Sweden)

=== Matchday 8 ===
29 January 2025
21:00 (20:00 UTC+0)

Aston Villa (The Football Association)	4–2	(Scottish Football Association) Celtic
Rogers 3', 5', 90+1'; Watkins 60'	Report	Idah 36', 38'

Villa Park, Birmingham
Attendance: 42,824
Referee: Clément Turpin (France)

29 January 2025
21:00

Bayer Leverkusen (German Football Association)	2–0	(Football Association of the Czech Republic) Sparta Prague
Wirtz 32'; Tella 64'	Report

BayArena, Leverkusen
Attendance: 30,210
Referee: Georgi Kabakov (Bulgaria)

29 January 2025
21:00

Borussia Dortmund (German Football Association)	3–1	(Ukrainian Association of Football) Shakhtar Donetsk
Guirassy 17', 44'; Bensebaini 79'	Report	Marlon 50'

Westfalenstadion, Dortmund
Attendance: 81,365
Referee: Glenn Nyberg (Sweden)

29 January 2025
21:00

Young Boys (Swiss Football Association)	0–1	(Football Association of Serbia) Red Star Belgrade
	Report	Kanga 69'

Stadion Wankdorf, Bern
Attendance: 31,500
Referee: Halil Umut Meler (Turkey)

29 January 2025
21:00

Barcelona (Royal Spanish Football Federation)	2–2	(Italian Football Federation) Atalanta
Yamal 47'; Araújo 72'	Report	Éderson 67'; Pašalić 79'

Estadi Olímpic Lluís Companys, Barcelona
Attendance: 42,728
Referee: Michael Oliver (England)

29 January 2025
21:00

Bayern Munich (German Football Association)	3–1	(Slovak Football Association) Slovan Bratislava
Müller 8'; Kane 63'; Coman 84'	Report	Tolić 90'

Allianz Arena, Munich
Attendance: 75,000
Referee: João Pinheiro (Portugal)

29 January 2025
21:00

Inter Milan (Italian Football Federation)	3–0	(French Football Federation) Monaco
L. Martínez 4' (pen.), 16', 67'	Report

San Siro, Milan
Attendance: 71,601
Referee: Irfan Peljto (Bosnia and Herzegovina)

29 January 2025
21:00

Red Bull Salzburg (Austrian Football Association)	1–4	(Royal Spanish Football Federation) Atlético Madrid
Daghim 90+1'	Report	Simeone 5'; Griezmann 13', 45+1'; Llorente 63'

Red Bull Arena, Salzburg
Attendance: 23,389
Referee: Anthony Taylor (England)

29 January 2025
21:00

Girona (Royal Spanish Football Federation)	1–2	(The Football Association) Arsenal
Danjuma 28'	Report	Jorginho 38' (pen.); Nwaneri 42'

Montilivi, Girona
Attendance: 9,048
Referee: Maurizio Mariani (Italy)

29 January 2025
21:00

Dinamo Zagreb (Croatian Football Federation)	2–1	(Italian Football Federation) Milan
Baturina 19'; Pjaca 60'	Report	Pulisic 53'

Stadion Maksimir, Zagreb
Attendance: 18,856
Referee: François Letexier (France)

29 January 2025
21:00

Juventus (Italian Football Federation)	0–2	(Portuguese Football Federation) Benfica
	Report	Pavlidis 16'; Kökçü 80'

Juventus Stadium, Turin
Attendance: 41,402
Referee: István Kovács (Romania)

29 January 2025
21:00

Lille (French Football Federation)	6–1	(Royal Dutch Football Association) Feyenoord
Sahraoui 4'; Trauner 38', 76' (o.g.); Gomes 57'; David 74'; Cabella 80'	Report	Giménez 14'

Stade Pierre-Mauroy, Villeneuve-d'Ascq
Attendance: 44,071
Referee: Slavko Vinčić (Slovenia)

29 January 2025
21:00 (20:00 UTC+0)

Manchester City (The Football Association)	3–1	(Royal Belgian Football Association) Club Brugge
Kovačić 53'; Ordóñez 62' (o.g.); Savinho 77'	Report	Onyedika 45'

City of Manchester Stadium, Manchester
Attendance: 51,237
Referee: José María Sánchez Martínez (Spain)

29 January 2025
21:00

PSV Eindhoven (Royal Dutch Football Association)	3–2	(The Football Association) Liverpool
Bakayoko 35'; Saibari 45'; Pepi 45+6'	Report	Gakpo 28' (pen.); Elliott 40'

Philips Stadion, Eindhoven
Attendance: 35,000
Referee: Tobias Stieler (Germany)

29 January 2025
21:00

Sturm Graz (Austrian Football Association)	1–0	(German Football Association) RB Leipzig
Malić 42'	Report

Wörthersee Stadion, Klagenfurt
Attendance: 26,851
Referee: Mykola Balakin (Ukraine)

29 January 2025
21:00 (20:00 UTC+0)

Sporting CP (Portuguese Football Federation)	1–1	(Italian Football Federation) Bologna
Harder 77'	Report	Pobega 21'

Estádio José Alvalade, Lisbon
Attendance: 37,328
Referee: Benoît Bastien (France)

29 January 2025
21:00

Brest (French Football Federation)	0–3	(Royal Spanish Football Federation) Real Madrid
	Report	Rodrygo 27', 78'; Bellingham 56'

Stade de Roudourou, Guingamp
Attendance: 15,405
Referee: Espen Eskås (Norway)

29 January 2025
21:00

VfB Stuttgart (German Football Association)	1–4	(French Football Federation) Paris Saint-Germain
Pacho 77' (o.g.)	Report	Barcola 6'; Dembélé 17', 35', 54'

MHPArena, Stuttgart
Attendance: 60,000
Referee: Davide Massa (Italy)
