= Arne Engels =

Belgian footballer (born 2003)

Personal information
- Date of birth: 8 September 2003 (age 23)
- Place of birth: Opwijk, Belgium
- Height: 1.84 m (6 ft 0 in)
- Positions: Central midfielder; right midfielder

Team information
- Current team: West Ham United
- Number: 7

Youth career
- 2014–2020: Club Brugge

Senior career*
Years	Team	Apps	(Gls)
2020–2023	Club NXT	35	(3)
2023–2024	FC Augsburg	51	(3)
2024–2026	Celtic	66	(14)
2026–	West Ham United	15	(1)

International career^{‡}
2018	Belgium U15	4	(1)
2018–2019	Belgium U16	8	(3)
2021–2022	Belgium U19	9	(2)
2023–2024	Belgium U21	10	(2)
2024–	Belgium	4	(0)
- * Club domestic league appearances and goals as of 16:57, 21 November 2026 (BST) ‡ National team caps and goals as of 17 November 2024

Arne Engels (born 8 September 2003) is a Belgian professional footballer who plays as a central midfielder or right winger for EFL Championship club West Ham United and the Belgium national team.

== Club career ==
=== Club NXT ===
Engels began his career at the youth academy of Club Brugge. On 22 August 2020, Engels made his debut for Brugge's reserve side, Club NXT in the Belgian First Division B against RWDM47. He was a starter as NXT lost 2–0.

=== FC Augsburg ===
On 3 January 2023, Engels signed for Bundesliga club FC Augsburg on a four-and-a-half-year contract.

=== Celtic ===
On 30 August 2024, Engels signed a four-year contract with Scottish Premiership side Celtic. On 1 September 2024, Engels made his debut for the club, coming on as a substitute replacing Paulo Bernardo in the 62nd minute in a 3–0 win against rivals Rangers. Engels soon became the Bhoys' designated penalty taker and won both the league title and Scottish League Cup in his first season.

He was linked with a move to Nottingham Forest during the 2026 January transfer window with Forest making multiple bids that were knocked back, including a joint Scottish record bid of £25 million.

=== West Ham United ===
On 15 August 2026, Engels signed a five-year contract with EFL Championship side West Ham United for a record fee in the region of £22 million. On 4 November 2026, he scored his first goal for the club in a 3–3 draw with Cardiff City.

== International career ==
Engels debuted for the Belgium national team on 6 September 2024 in a Nations League game against Israel at the Nagyerdei Stadion in Hungary. He substituted Youri Tielemans in the 74th minute of Belgium's 3–1 victory.

== Career statistics ==
=== Club ===
As of match played 4 November 2026

Appearances and goals by club, season and competition
Club	Season	League			National cup (Note: Includes DFB-Pokal, Scottish Cup)		League cup (Note: Includes Scottish League Cup, EFL Cup)		Europe		Total	
Club	Season	Division	Apps	Goals	Apps	Goals	Apps	Goals	Apps	Goals	Apps	Goals
Club NXT	2020–21	Challenger Pro League	20	1	—		—		—		20	1
Club NXT	2021–22	Challenger Pro League	0	0	—		—		—		0	0
Club NXT	2022–23	Challenger Pro League	15	2	—		—		—		15	2
Club NXT	Total		35	3	—		—		—		35	3
FC Augsburg	2022–23	Bundesliga	18	0	0	0	—		—		18	0
FC Augsburg	2023–24	Bundesliga	32	3	1	0	—		—		33	3
FC Augsburg	2024–25	Bundesliga	1	0	1	0	—		—		2	0
FC Augsburg	Total		51	3	2	0	—		—		53	3
Celtic	2024–25	Scottish Premiership	34	9	5	0	3	0	10 (Note: Appearances in UEFA Champions League)	1	52	10
Celtic	2025–26	Scottish Premiership	30	5	2	1	4	0	10 (Note: Two appearances in UEFA Champions League, eight appearances and one goal in UEFA Europa League)	1	46	7
Celtic	2026–27	Scottish Premiership	2	0	—		—		—		2	0
Celtic	Total		66	14	7	1	7	0	20	2	100	17
West Ham United	2026–27	Championship	13	1	0	0	2	0	—		15	1
Career total			165	21	9	1	9	0	20	2	203	24

=== International ===
As of match played 17 November 2024

Appearances and goals by national team and year
National team	Year	Apps	Goals
Belgium
Belgium	2024	4	0
Total		4	0

== Honours ==
Celtic

- Scottish Premiership: 2024–25, 2025–26
- Scottish Cup: 2025–26
- Scottish League Cup: 2024–25
