= Daizen Maeda =

Japanese footballer (born 1997)

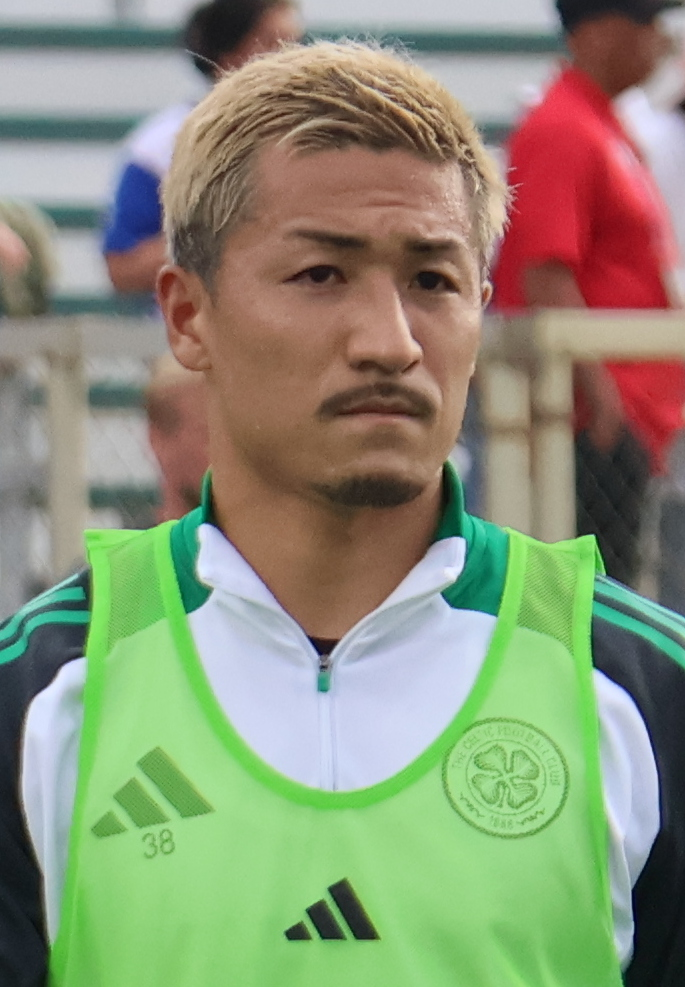
- Maeda training with Celtic in 2024

Personal information
- Full name: Daizen Maeda
- Date of birth: 20 October 1997 (age 29)
- Place of birth: Taishi, Osaka, Japan
- Height: 1.73 m (5 ft 8 in)
- Positions: Left winger; forward

Team information
- Current team: Ipswich Town
- Number: 38

Youth career
- 2004–2009: Taishi JSC
- 2010–2012: Kawakami FC
- 2013–2015: Yamanashi Gakuin University High School

Senior career*
Years	Team	Apps	(Gls)
2016–2020	Matsumoto Yamaga	56	(9)
2017	→ Mito HollyHock (loan)	2	(1)
2019–2020	→ Marítimo (loan)	23	(3)
2020	→ Yokohama F. Marinos (loan)	23	(3)
2021–2022	Yokohama F. Marinos	36	(23)
2022	→ Celtic (loan)	16	(6)
2022–2026	Celtic	133	(44)
2026–	Ipswich Town	10	(1)

International career^{‡}
2018–2021	Japan Olympic	1	(3)
2019–	Japan	34	(5)
Medal record
Representing Japan
Asian Games
Silver medal – second place	2018 Jakarta-Palembang	Team
- * Club domestic league appearances and goals as of 17 October 2026 ‡ National team caps and goals as of 14 November 2026

Daizen Maeda (前田 大然, Maeda Daizen; born 20 October 1997) is a Japanese professional footballer who plays as a left winger or forward for Premier League club Ipswich Town and the Japan national team.

Maeda began his career with Matsumoto Yamaga before spells with Mito HollyHock, Marítimo and Yokohama F. Marinos, where he finished as the J1 League top scorer in 2021. Since joining Celtic in 2022, Maeda has won multiple domestic honours and established himself as one of the club's key attacking players. He has represented Japan internationally since 2019, featuring at the 2022 FIFA World Cup, 2023 AFC Asian Cup and 2026 World Cup.

== Club career ==
=== Matsumoto Yamaga ===
In 2016, Maeda joined Matsumoto Yamaga. He got his J-League debut on 28 February 2016. It was on 28 August 2016, that he scored his first goal as a professional in an Emperor's Cup game against Tokuyama University.

After his loan spell at Mito, he struggled for regular playing time and was loaned to the Portuguese club, Maritimo in 2019. He left the club in 2021 after his loan with Yokohama F. Marinos was made permanent.

==== Mito HollyHock (loan) ====
Maeda joined Mito HollyHock on a loan deal from February 2017 until January 2018. He ended the season while scoring 13 goals.

==== Maritimo (loan) ====
On 11 August 2019, he made his debut in the opening round of Portuguese League against Sporting CP when he came on as a substitute in the 57th minute.

On 25 August 2019, Maeda scored his debut goal in a 3–2 loss to Tondela.

=== Yokohama F. Marinos ===
In August 2020, he was loaned to Yokohama F. Marinos. He scored his first goal after the transfer in the match against Shimizu S-Pulse on 19 August, and contributed to the team's first victory in three games.

By the end of the season, the deal was made permanent. On 7 March 2021, he scored a brace against Sanfrecce Hiroshima and continued his prolific run of form on 17 March, scoring four goals in one game against Tokushima Vortis. On 25 September 2021, with a goal against Yokohama FC, Maeda became the top scorer in the J1 League. On 6 November against FC Tokyo, he scored his second hat-trick of the season to keep his spot in the top scorers' ranking. In addition to being named in the J.League Best XI at the end of the season, Maeda was also co-J.League Top Scorer with Leandro Damiao of Kawasaki Frontale, who had equalled his total of 23 goals for the campaign.

=== Celtic ===
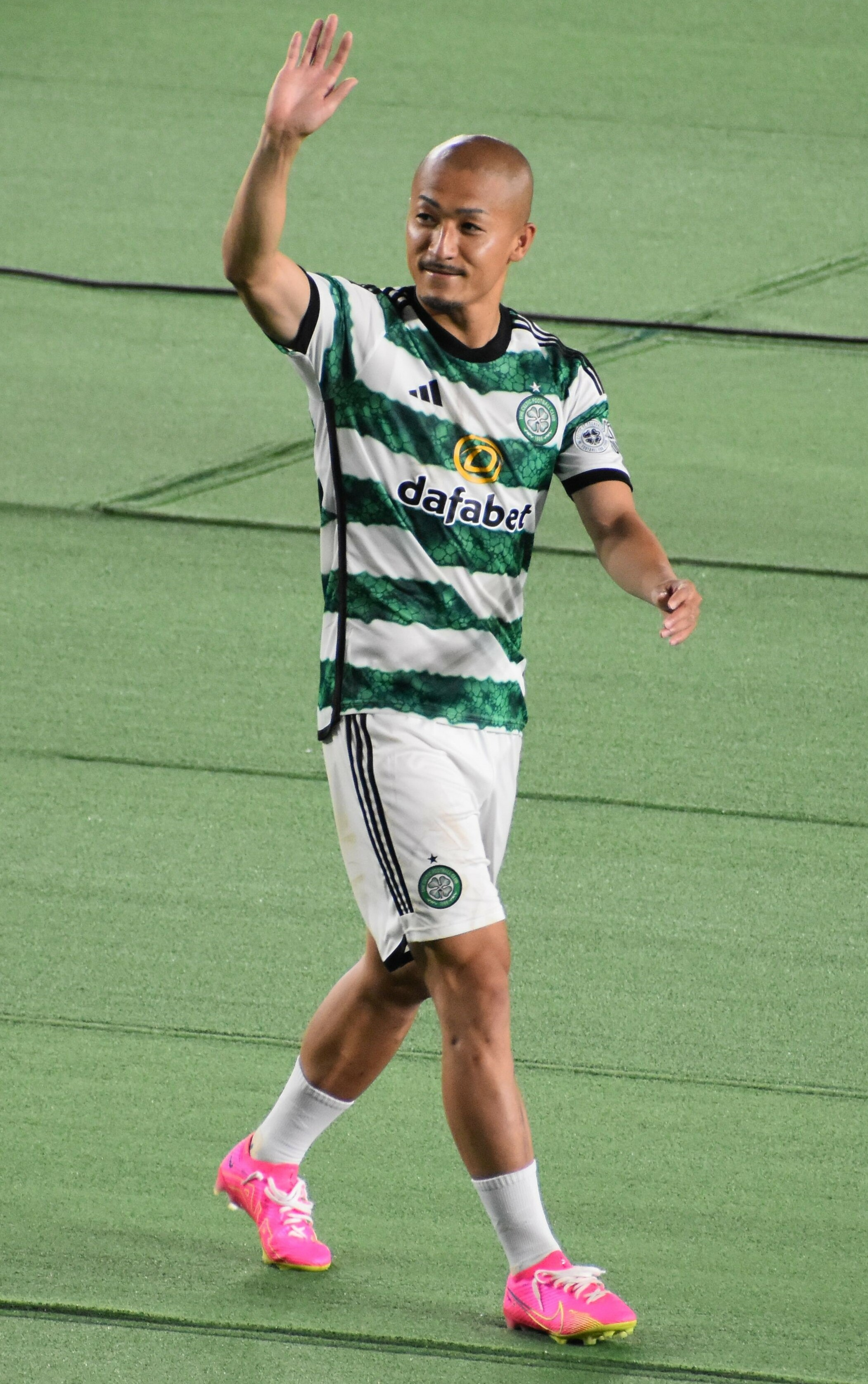
Maeda with Celtic in 2023

On 31 December 2021, it was announced that Maeda had signed for Scottish Premiership club Celtic on loan for the rest of the season, with an obligation to buy at the end of the loan. On 17 January 2022, Maeda made his debut for Celtic and scored his first goal in the fourth minute, in a league fixture against Hibernian at Celtic Park. Maeda signed a four-year contract with Celtic at the end of the season, when his move was made permanent.

On 6 September 2022, Maeda came on as a half-time substitute for Liel Abada to make his UEFA Champions League debut in a 3–0 home defeat against Real Madrid. On 2 January 2023, he scored the opening goal in a 2–2 draw at Rangers. His form at this time saw Premier League side Southampton monitor him.

On 6 July 2023, Maeda signed a new four-year contract with Celtic, keeping him at the club until 2027.

Maeda had his most prolific season during 2024–25, scoring over 30 goals, with his form particularly picking up from January. He scored his first Champions League goal against Slovan Bratislava, and scored a further three against Borussia Dortmund, Club Brugge and Bayern Munich. This put him level with Shinji Kagawa and Takumi Minamino for most goals by a Japanese player in the Champions League. It also made him the first player to score four goals for Celtic in UEFA competition since Joe Craig in the 1977–78 season.

Upon scoring against Kilmarnock on 12 April 2025, he became the first Celtic player to score in eight consecutive starts at Parkhead since Henrik Larsson in 2004. Celtic fans also began singing Maeda's name to the tune of "Tequila" by the Champs.

Maeda was named as one of four nominees for the 2024–25 PFA Scotland Players' Player of the Year, alongside teammates Callum McGregor and Nicolas Kühn, and Dundee striker Simon Murray.

In August 2025, it was reported that Maeda wanted to leave Celtic but could not as the club did not have time to buy a backup. This led to poor form in the months of September and October, with Maeda only scoring two goals.

In the closing stages of the 2025–26 season, Maeda scored in five consecutive league matches, including a stunning overhead against Rangers and the decisive second goal in the 87th minute of a 3–1 victory over Hearts on 16 May 2026, the final matchday, helping secure his club's record 56th league title. He also scored the opening goal in the Scottish Cup final against Dunfermline the following week, lobbing goalkeeper Aston Oxborough from the edge of the penalty box.

=== Ipswich Town ===
On 25 July 2026, Daizen signed for Premier League side Ipswich Town.

== International career ==
On 24 May 2019, Maeda was called by Japan's head coach Hajime Moriyasu to feature in the Copa América played in Brazil. He was also the first Matsumoto Yamaga player to ever feature for the senior side. He made his debut on 17 June 2019 in the game against Chile, as a starter.

In Japan's 2022 World Cup game against Germany, Maeda was placed as starting striker. He was substituted in the 57th minute by Takuma Asano. Japan advanced out of the group stage after beating Spain 2–1. On 5 December 2022, Maeda scored a goal in the 43rd minute to put Japan in front during the round of 16 game against Croatia which eventually ended 1–1, with Japan crashing out after their defeat on penalties.

Along with his Celtic teammate Reo Hatate, Maeda was called up to the Japanese squad for the 2023 AFC Asian Cup in Qatar.

On 28 March 2026, Maeda captained Japan for the first time in a friendly match against Scotland. In May, he was named in the 26-man squad for the 2026 FIFA World Cup. On 25 June, Maeda scored in Japan's final group stage match against Sweden, which ended in a 1–1 draw.

== Style of play ==
Though primarily and initially used by both Matsumoto Yamaga and Yokohama F. Marinos as a left winger, Maeda is able to operate in a number of positions as a forward, including on the opposite flank, as an attacking midfielder or occasionally a second striker. Regarding his stamina and conditioning, former coach John Hutchinson referred to Maeda as a "machine", while Arthur Papas, who also coached Maeda during his time at Yokohama, hailed his pace and sprinting.

== Career statistics ==
=== Club ===
As of match played 17 October 2026

Appearances and goals by club, season and competition
Club	Season	League			National cup (Note: Includes Emperor's Cup, Taça de Portugal, Scottish Cup)		League cup (Note: Includes J.League Cup, Scottish League Cup, EFL Cup)		Continental		Total	
Club	Season	Division	Apps	Goals	Apps	Goals	Apps	Goals	Apps	Goals	Apps	Goals
Matsumoto Yamaga	2016	J2 League	9	0	1	1	0	0	—		10	1
Matsumoto Yamaga	2018	J2 League	29	7	0	0	0	0	—		29	7
Matsumoto Yamaga	2019	J1 League	18	2	0	0	0	0	—		18	2
Matsumoto Yamaga	Total		56	9	1	1	0	0	—		57	10
Mito HollyHock (loan)	2017	J2 League	36	13	0	0	0	0	—		36	13
Marítimo (loan)	2019–20	Primeira Liga	23	3	1	1	0	0	—		24	4
Yokohama F. Marinos (loan)	2020	J1 League	23	3	0	0	2	0	5 (Note: Appearances in AFC Champions League)	0	30	3
Yokohama F. Marinos	2021	J1 League	36	23	0	0	4	0	—		40	23
Yokohama F. Marinos	Yokohama total		59	26	0	0	6	0	5	0	70	26
Celtic (loan)	2021–22	Scottish Premiership	16	6	4	1	—		2 (Note: Appearances in UEFA Europa Conference League)	1	22	8
Celtic	2022–23	Scottish Premiership	35	8	4	1	4	2	6 (Note: Appearances in UEFA Champions League)	0	49	11
Celtic	2023–24	Scottish Premiership	28	6	3	4	1	0	4	0	36	10
Celtic	2024–25	Scottish Premiership	34	16	5	7	3	6	9	4	51	33
Celtic	2025–26	Scottish Premiership	36	14	3	2	4	1	11 (Note: Two appearances in UEFA Champions League, nine appearances in UEFA Europa League)	0	54	17
Celtic	Celtic total		149	50	19	15	12	9	32	5	212	79
Ipswich Town	2026–27	Premier League	7	1	0	0	1	0	—		8	1
Career total			330	102	21	17	19	9	37	5	407	133

=== International ===
As of match played 14 November 2026

Appearances and goals by national team and year
National team	Year	Apps	Goals
Japan	2019	2	0
Japan	2020	0	0
Japan	2021	0	0
Japan	2022	9	2
Japan	2023	2	1
Japan	2024	9	1
Japan	2025	4	0
Japan	2026	8	1
Total		34	5

Scores and results list Japan's goal tally first.

List of international goals scored by Daizen Maeda
No.	Date	Venue	Cap	Opponent	Score	Result	Competition
1.	10 June 2022	Noevir Stadium Kobe, Kobe, Japan	7	Ghana	4–1	4–1	2022 Kirin Cup
2.	5 December 2022	Al Janoub Stadium, Al Wakrah, Qatar	11	Croatia	1–0	1–1 (a.e.t.) (1–3 p)	2022 FIFA World Cup
3.	20 June 2023	Suita City Football Stadium, Suita, Japan	12	Peru	4–0	4–1	2023 Kirin Challenge Cup
4.	5 September 2024	Saitama Stadium 2002, Saitama, Japan	19	China	6–0	7–0	2026 FIFA World Cup qualification
5.	25 June 2026	AT&T Stadium, Arlington, United States	29	Sweden	1–0	1–1	2026 FIFA World Cup

== Honours ==
Matsumoto Yamaga

- J2 League: 2018

Celtic

- Scottish Premiership (5): 2021–22, 2022–23, 2023–24, 2024–25, 2025–26
- Scottish Cup (3): 2022–23, 2023–24, 2025–26
- Scottish League Cup (2): 2022–23, 2024–25

Individual

- J.League Top Scorer: 2021
- J.League Best XI: 2021
- PFA Scotland Players' Player of the Year: 2024–25
- PFA Scotland Team of the Year (Premiership): 2024–25
- Celtic Player of the Year: 2024–25
