= Paulo Bernardo (footballer) =

Portuguese footballer (born 2002)

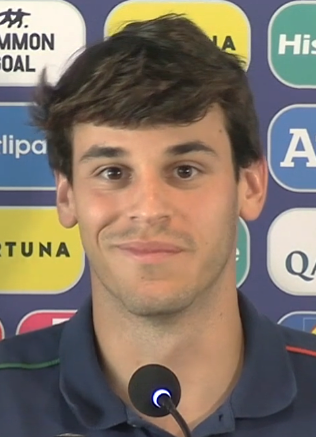
- Bernardo with Portugal U21 in 2025

Personal information
- Full name: Paulo Guilherme Gonçalvés Bernardo
- Date of birth: 24 January 2002 (age 24)
- Place of birth: Almada, Portugal
- Height: 1.80 m (5 ft 11 in)
- Position: Central midfielder

Team information
- Current team: Górnik Zabrze (on loan from Celtic)
- Number: 8

Youth career
- 2010–2022: Benfica

Senior career*
Years	Team	Apps	(Gls)
2020–2024	Benfica B	38	(7)
2021–2024	Benfica	17	(0)
2023	→ Paços de Ferreira (loan)	13	(2)
2023–2024	→ Celtic (loan)	22	(3)
2024–	Celtic	38	(2)
2026–	→ Górnik Zabrze (loan)	3	(0)

International career
2017	Portugal U15	5	(1)
2017–2018	Portugal U16	11	(0)
2018–2019	Portugal U17	19	(4)
2019	Portugal U19	5	(1)
2021–2025	Portugal U21	32	(11)
- * Club domestic league appearances and goals as of 20:47, 2 September 2026 (UTC)

Paulo Guilherme Gonçalves Bernardo (Portuguese pronunciation: [ˈpawlu βɨɾˈnaɾðu]; born 24 January 2002) is a Portuguese professional footballer who plays as a central midfielder for Ekstraklasa club Górnik Zabrze, on loan from Scottish Premiership club Celtic.

== Club career ==
=== Early career ===
Bernardo joined Benfica's youth system in 2010. He progressed through the club's academy and signed his first professional contract on 26 February 2018.

He made his professional debut for Benfica B on 2 February 2020, appearing in a LigaPro match against Vilafranquense. His performances for the reserve side later earned him the Liga Portugal 2 Midfielder of the Month award for October and November 2021.

=== Benfica ===
Bernardo made his Benfica first-team debut on 2 November 2021, replacing João Mário during a 5–2 defeat against Bayern Munich in the UEFA Champions League. Five days later, he made his Primeira Liga debut as a substitute in a 6–1 home victory over Braga.

On 31 January 2023, Bernardo joined Paços de Ferreira on loan until the end of the season. He scored his first goal for the club on 6 March, in a 2–1 league defeat against Casa Pia.

=== Celtic ===
On 1 September 2023, Bernardo joined Celtic on a season-long loan which included an option to make the transfer permanent. He scored his first goal for Celtic on 26 December, opening the scoring in a 3–0 league victory against Dundee.

During his first season in Scotland, Bernardo made 33 appearances in all competitions and scored four goals. He was part of the Celtic side that won both the 2023–24 Scottish Premiership and the 2023–24 Scottish Cup.

On 1 August 2024, Bernardo returned to Celtic on a permanent transfer, signing a five-year contract.

He made 30 league appearances during the 2024–25 season, scoring twice, as Celtic retained the Scottish championship and won the Scottish League Cup. His playing time decreased during the following campaign. By the end of the 2025–26 season, he had made 97 appearances for Celtic in all competitions, scoring seven goals.

=== Górnik Zabrze ===
On 4 August 2026, Bernardo joined Polish Ekstraklasa club Górnik Zabrze on loan until 30 June 2027. The agreement included an option for Górnik to make the transfer permanent. He was assigned the number 8 shirt.

== International career ==
Bernardo represented Portugal at under-15, under-16, under-17, under-19 and under-21 levels. With the under-17 team, he participated in the 2019 UEFA European Under-17 Championship in the Republic of Ireland. He played four matches and scored once as Portugal reached the quarter-finals.

On 6 September 2021, Bernardo made his debut for the under-21 team, replacing André Almeida during a 1–0 victory over Belarus in qualification for the 2023 UEFA European Under-21 Championship.

He was selected for Portugal's squad at the 2025 UEFA European Under-21 Championship. On 14 June, he scored in a 5–0 group-stage victory over Poland. He finished his under-21 career with 32 appearances and 11 goals.

== Career statistics ==
=== Club ===
As of match played 27 August 2026

Appearances and goals by club, season and competition
Club	Season	League			National cup (Note: Includes Scottish Cup)		League cup (Note: Includes Taça da Liga, Scottish League Cup)		Continental		Total	
Club	Season	Division	Apps	Goals	Apps	Goals	Apps	Goals	Apps	Goals	Apps	Goals
Benfica B	2019–20	Liga Portugal 2	2	0	—		—		—		2	0
Benfica B	2020–21	Liga Portugal 2	17	4	—		—		—		17	4
Benfica B	2021–22	Liga Portugal 2	10	2	—		—		—		10	2
Benfica B	2022–23	Liga Portugal 2	9	1	—		—		—		9	1
Benfica B	Total		38	7	—		—		—		38	7
Benfica	2021–22	Primeira Liga	17	0	0	0	2	0	5 (Note: Appearance(s) in UEFA Champions League)	0	24	0
Benfica	2022–23	Primeira Liga	0	0	0	0	1	0	1	0	2	0
Benfica	Total		17	0	0	0	3	0	6	0	26	0
Paços de Ferreira (loan)	2022–23	Primeira Liga	13	2	—		—		—		13	2
Celtic (loan)	2023–24	Scottish Premiership	22	3	5	1	0	0	6	0	33	4
Celtic	2024–25	Scottish Premiership	30	2	2	0	4	1	8	0	44	3
Celtic	2025–26	Scottish Premiership	8	0	3	0	2	0	7 (Note: Appearances in UEFA Europa League)	0	20	0
Celtic	Total		38	2	5	0	6	1	15	0	64	3
Górnik Zabrze (loan)	2026–27	Ekstraklasa	2	0	0	0	—		3 (Note: One appearance in UEFA Europa League, two appearances in UEFA Conference League)	0	5	0
Career total			130	14	10	1	9	1	30	0	179	16

== Honours ==
Celtic

- Scottish Premiership: 2023–24, 2024–25, 2025–26
- Scottish Cup: 2023–24, 2025–26
- Scottish League Cup: 2024–25

Individual

- Liga Portugal 2 Midfielder of the Month: October/November 2021
