= List of Scottish Cup winning managers =

This is a list of Scottish Cup winning football managers. The Scottish Cup was first competed for in the 1873–74 season. Football in Scotland did not become a professional sport until the 1890s. This meant that clubs in this early period were generally organised by a management committee, or a board of directors if the club had been incorporated. The position of team manager was not introduced in Scottish football until the 1890s, or even later in some instances.

Willie Maley, with Celtic in 1899, was the first team manager to win the competition. This list gives details of the winning club and their manager in each season since then. Maley is also the most successful manager in the history of the competition, winning 14 Scottish Cups during his long tenure.

== Winning managers ==
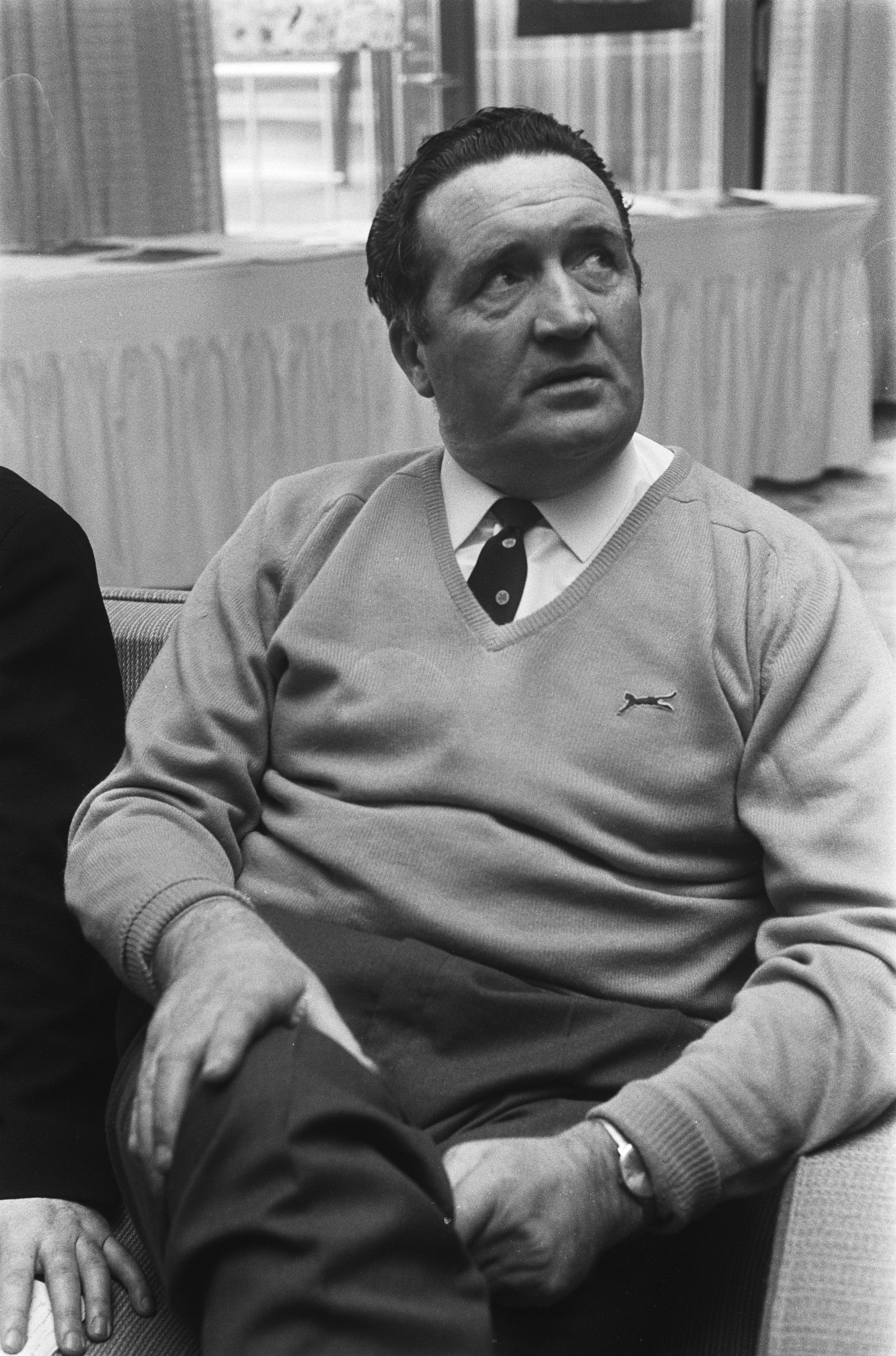
Jock Stein is one of only two managers to have won the Scottish Cup with more than one club. Stein won it eight times with Celtic between 1965 and 1977. His first Scottish Cup victory was with Dunfermline Athletic in 1961.

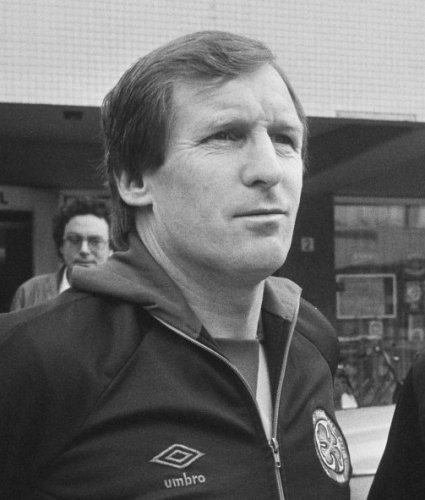
Billy McNeill won the Scottish Cup three times as a manager, in two spells with Celtic.

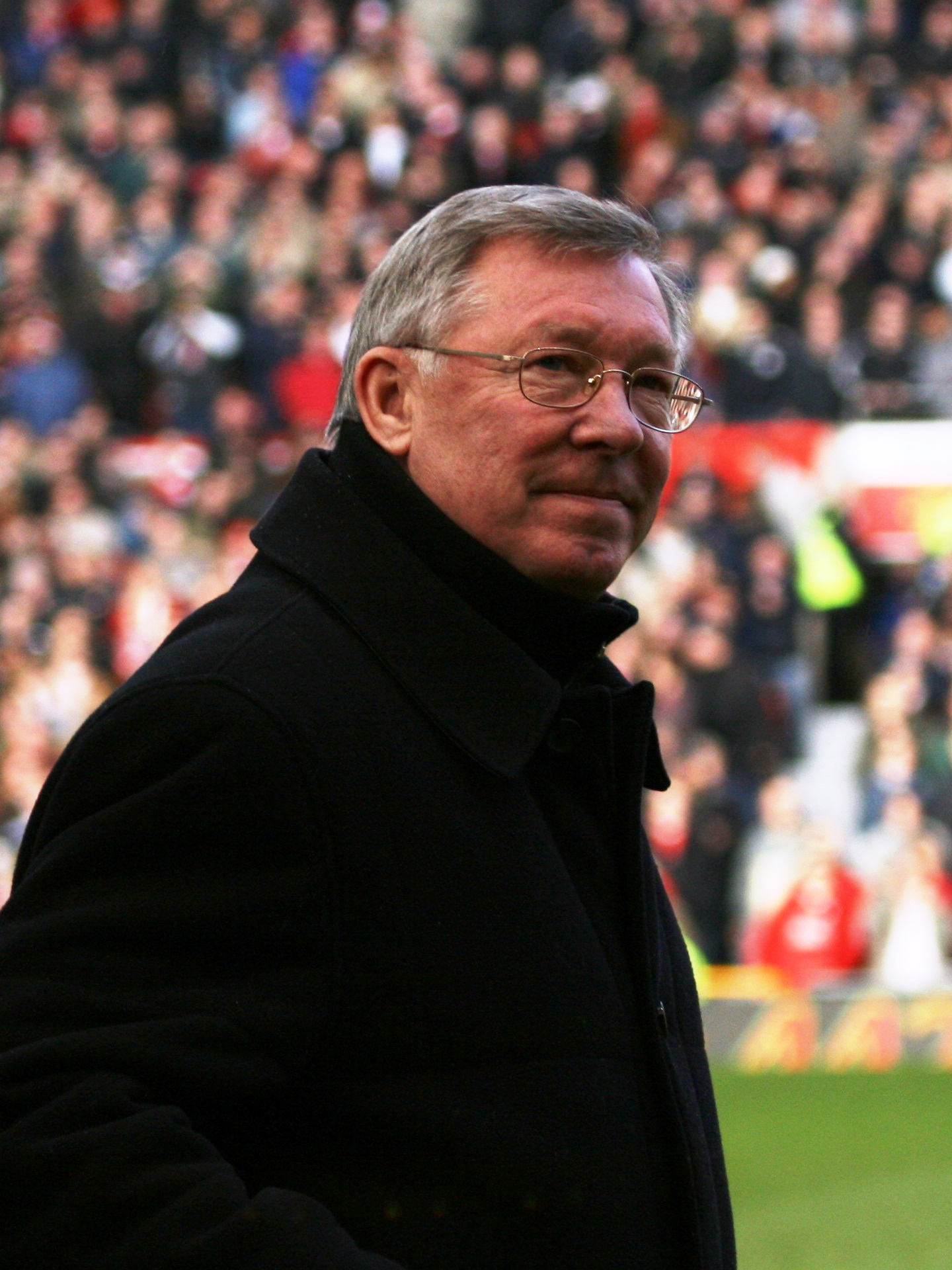
Alex Ferguson is the only manager to have won the Scottish Cup more than twice, without having managed either half of the Old Firm. His Aberdeen side won four Scottish Cups between 1982 and 1986.

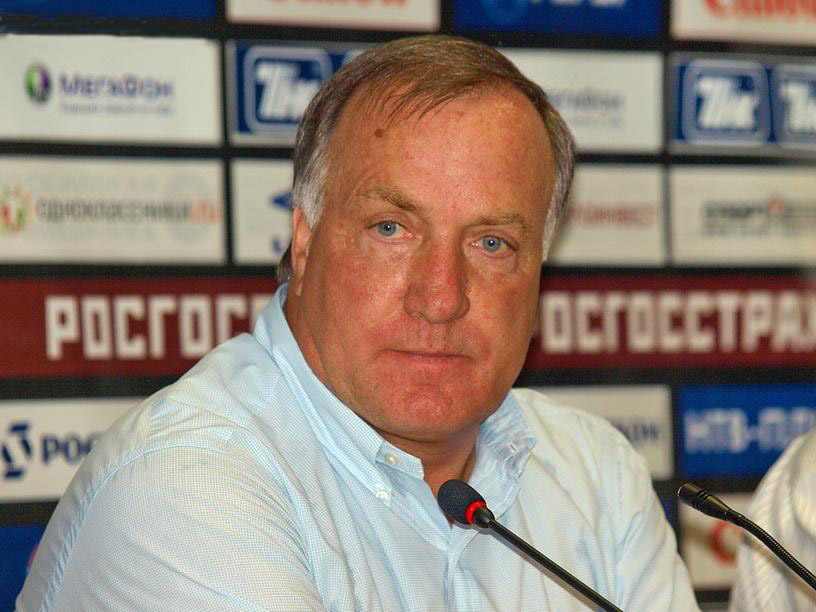
Dick Advocaat won the Scottish Cup twice, with Rangers in 1999 and 2000.

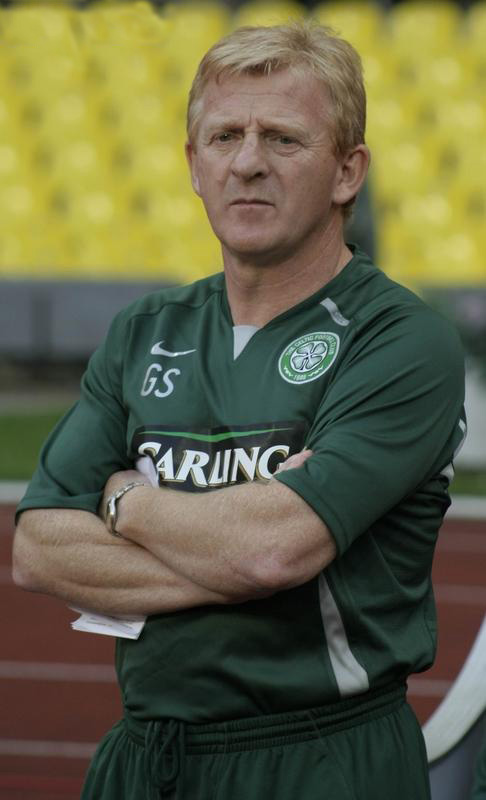
Gordon Strachan managed the Celtic side that won the Scottish Cup in 2007.

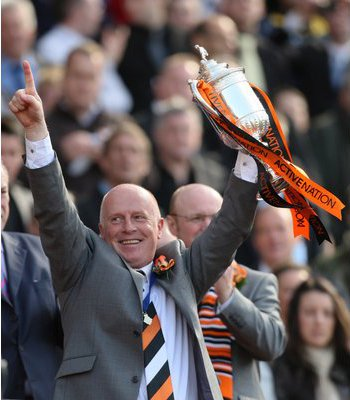
Peter Houston lifts the Scottish Cup in 2010, celebrating the victory of his Dundee United team.

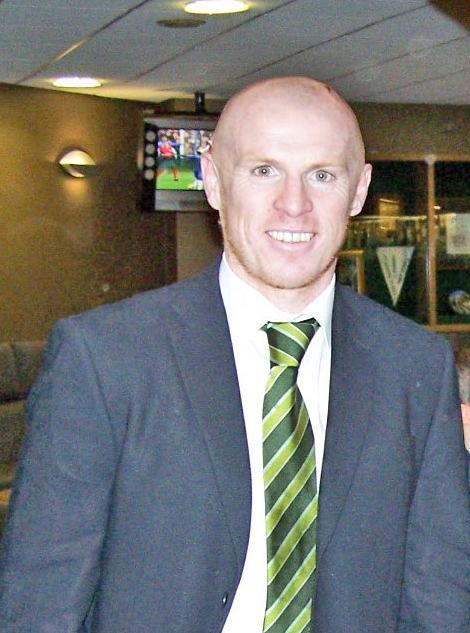
Neil Lennon has won the Scottish Cup four times as a manager, with Celtic in 2011, 2013, 2019 and 2020.

Final	Manager	Nationality	Club	Ref
1899	Willie Maley	Scotland	Celtic	
1900	Willie Maley	Scotland	Celtic	
1901	—	—	Heart of Midlothian	(Note: In the early years of organised football, many clubs did not appoint a manager. A management committee or board of directors (if the club had been incorporated) would pick the team instead.)
1902	Dan McMichael	Ireland	Hibernian	
1903	William Wilton	Scotland	Rangers	
1904	Willie Maley	Scotland	Celtic	
1905	Samuel Wyllie	Scotland	Third Lanark	
1906	William Waugh	Scotland	Heart of Midlothian	
1907	Willie Maley	Scotland	Celtic	
1908	Willie Maley	Scotland	Celtic	
1909	—	—	—	
1910	Willie Wallace	Scotland	Dundee	
1911	Willie Maley	Scotland	Celtic	
1912	Willie Maley	Scotland	Celtic	
1913	Willie Nicol	Scotland	Falkirk	
1914	Willie Maley	Scotland	Celtic	
1920	Hugh Spence	Scotland	Kilmarnock	
1921	George Easton	Scotland	Partick Thistle	
1922	Bob Cochrane	Scotland	Greenock Morton	
1923	Willie Maley	Scotland	Celtic	
1924	Willie Orr	Scotland	Airdrieonians	
1925	Willie Maley	Scotland	Celtic	
1926	Johnny Cochrane	Scotland	St Mirren	
1927	Willie Maley	Scotland	Celtic	
1928	Bill Struth	Scotland	Rangers	
1929	Hugh Spence	Scotland	Kilmarnock	
1930	Bill Struth	Scotland	Rangers	
1931	Willie Maley	Scotland	Celtic	
1932	Bill Struth	Scotland	Rangers	
1933	Willie Maley	Scotland	Celtic	
1934	Bill Struth	Scotland	Rangers	
1935	Bill Struth	Scotland	Rangers	
1936	Bill Struth	Scotland	Rangers	
1937	Willie Maley	Scotland	Celtic	
1938	David McLean	Scotland	East Fife	
1939	Paddy Travers	Scotland	Clyde	
1947	Dave Halliday	Scotland	Aberdeen	
1948	Bill Struth	Scotland	Rangers	
1949	Bill Struth	Scotland	Rangers	
1950	Bill Struth	Scotland	Rangers	
1951	Jimmy McGrory	Scotland	Celtic	
1952	George Stevenson	Scotland	Motherwell	
1953	Bill Struth	Scotland	Rangers	
1954	Jimmy McGrory	Scotland	Celtic	
1955	Paddy Travers	Scotland	Clyde	
1956	Tommy Walker	Scotland	Heart of Midlothian	
1957	Reg Smith	England	Falkirk	
1958	Johnny Haddow	Scotland	Clyde	
1959	Willie Reid	Scotland	St Mirren	
1960	Scot Symon	Scotland	Rangers	
1961	Jock Stein	Scotland	Dunfermline Athletic	
1962	Scot Symon	Scotland	Rangers	
1963	Scot Symon	Scotland	Rangers	
1964	Scot Symon	Scotland	Rangers	
1965	Jock Stein	Scotland	Celtic	
1966	Scot Symon	Scotland	Rangers	
1967	Jock Stein	Scotland	Celtic	
1968	George Farm	Scotland	Dunfermline Athletic	
1969	Jock Stein	Scotland	Celtic	
1970	Eddie Turnbull	Scotland	Aberdeen	
1971	Jock Stein	Scotland	Celtic	
1972	Jock Stein	Scotland	Celtic	
1973	Jock Wallace, Jr.	Scotland	Rangers	
1974	Jock Stein	Scotland	Celtic	
1975	Jock Stein	Scotland	Celtic	
1976	Jock Wallace, Jr.	Scotland	Rangers	
1977	Jock Stein	Scotland	Celtic	
1978	Jock Wallace, Jr.	Scotland	Rangers	
1979	John Greig	Scotland	Rangers	
1980	Billy McNeill	Scotland	Celtic	
1981	John Greig	Scotland	Rangers	
1982	Alex Ferguson	Scotland	Aberdeen	
1983	Alex Ferguson	Scotland	Aberdeen	
1984	Alex Ferguson	Scotland	Aberdeen	
1985	David Hay	Scotland	Celtic	
1986	Alex Ferguson	Scotland	Aberdeen	
1987	Alex Smith	Scotland	St Mirren	
1988	Billy McNeill	Scotland	Celtic	
1989	Billy McNeill	Scotland	Celtic	
1990	Alex Smith and Jocky Scott	Scotland	Aberdeen	(Note: Alex Smith and Jocky Scott were "co-managers" of Aberdeen.)
1991	Tommy McLean	Scotland	Motherwell	
1992	Walter Smith	Scotland	Rangers	
1993	Walter Smith	Scotland	Rangers	
1994	Ivan Golac	Yugoslavia	Dundee United	
1995	Tommy Burns	Scotland	Celtic	
1996	Walter Smith	Scotland	Rangers	
1997	Bobby Williamson	Scotland	Kilmarnock	
1998	Jim Jefferies	Scotland	Heart of Midlothian	
1999	Dick Advocaat	Netherlands	Rangers	
2000	Dick Advocaat	Netherlands	Rangers	
2001	Martin O'Neill	Northern Ireland	Celtic	
2002	Alex McLeish	Scotland	Rangers	
2003	Alex McLeish	Scotland	Rangers	
2004	Martin O'Neill	Northern Ireland	Celtic	
2005	Martin O'Neill	Northern Ireland	Celtic	
2006	Valdas Ivanauskas	Lithuania	Heart of Midlothian	
2007	Gordon Strachan	Scotland	Celtic	
2008	Walter Smith	Scotland	Rangers	
2009	Walter Smith	Scotland	Rangers	
2010	Peter Houston	Scotland	Dundee United	
2011	Neil Lennon	Northern Ireland	Celtic	
2012	Paulo Sérgio	Portugal	Heart of Midlothian	
2013	Neil Lennon	Northern Ireland	Celtic	
2014	Tommy Wright	Northern Ireland	St Johnstone	
2015	John Hughes	Scotland	Inverness Caledonian Thistle	
2016	Alan Stubbs	England	Hibernian	
2017	Brendan Rodgers	Northern Ireland	Celtic	
2018	Brendan Rodgers	Northern Ireland	Celtic	
2019	Neil Lennon	Northern Ireland	Celtic	
2020	Neil Lennon	Northern Ireland	Celtic	
2021	Callum Davidson	Scotland	St Johnstone	
2022	Giovanni van Bronckhorst	Netherlands	Rangers	
2023	Ange Postecoglou	Australia	Celtic	
2024	Brendan Rodgers	Northern Ireland	Celtic	
2025	Jimmy Thelin	Sweden	Aberdeen	
2026	Martin O'Neill	Northern Ireland	Celtic	

=== By individual ===
Rank	Manager	Wins	Club(s)	Winning years
1	Willie Maley	14	Celtic	1899, 1900, 1904, 1907, 1908, 1911, 1912, 1914, 1923, 1925, 1927, 1931, 1933, 1937
2	Bill Struth	10	Rangers	1928, 1930, 1932, 1934, 1935, 1936, 1948, 1949, 1950, 1953
3	Jock Stein	9	Dunfermline Athletic, Celtic	1961, 1965, 1967, 1969, 1971, 1972, 1974, 1975, 1977
4	Walter Smith	5	Rangers	1992, 1993, 1996, 2008, 2009
=	Scot Symon	5	Rangers	1960, 1962, 1963, 1964, 1966
6	Alex Ferguson	4	Aberdeen	1982, 1983, 1984, 1986
=	Neil Lennon	4	Celtic	2011, 2013, 2019, 2020
=	Martin O'Neill	4	Celtic	2001, 2004, 2005, 2026
9	Billy McNeill	3	Celtic	1980, 1988, 1989
=	Brendan Rodgers	3	Celtic	2017, 2018, 2024
=	Jock Wallace, Jr.	3	Rangers	1973, 1976, 1978
12	Dick Advocaat	2	Rangers	1999, 2000
=	John Greig	2	Rangers	1979, 1981
=	Jimmy McGrory	2	Celtic	1951, 1954
=	Alex McLeish	2	Rangers	2002, 2003
=	Alex Smith	2	St Mirren, Aberdeen	1987, 1990
=	Hugh Spence	2	Kilmarnock	1920, 1929
=	Paddy Travers	2	Clyde	1939, 1955

=== By nationality ===
Country	Managers	Total
Scotland	40	91
Northern Ireland	4	12
Netherlands	2	3
England	2	2
Australia	1	1
Ireland	1	1
Lithuania	1	1
Portugal	1	1
Sweden	1	1
Yugoslavia	1	1

== See also ==
- List of Scottish Cup finals (a full list of Scottish Cup winning clubs)
- List of FA Cup winning managers (English equivalent)
