= Football records in Scotland =

Football in Scotland is a popular professional sport. Founded in 1873, Scotland has the second oldest national football association in the world. The national cup competition, the Scottish Cup, was started in the 1873–74 season. Its trophy is the oldest national sporting trophy in the world. A Scottish football league system was first instituted in 1890, with the creation of the Scottish Football League. A second national cup competition, the Scottish League Cup, was created in the 1946–47 season. This page details the team and individual records set in these competitions.

== League competitions ==
=== Team records ===
Top ten clubs by league titles won
Rank	Club	Tier One: Premiership	Tier Two: Championship	Tier Three: League One	Tier Four: League Two	Totals
1	Celtic	56				56
2	Rangers	55	1	1	1	58
3	Hibernian	4	6			10
4	Greenock Morton		6	3	1	10
5	Falkirk		7	2		9
6	Raith Rovers		6	3		9
7	Ayr United		6	3		9
8	Clyde		5	4		9
9	St Johnstone		8			8
10	Partick Thistle		6	2		8

Clubs winning all four divisions
Rank	Club	Tier One: Premiership	Tier Two: Championship	Tier Three: League One	Tier Four: League Two
1	Rangers	55	1	1	1
2	Dumbarton	2	2	1	1

Clubs winning bottom 3 divisions
Rank	Club	Tier Two: Championship	Tier Three: League One	Tier Four: League Two
1	Greenock Morton	6	3	1
2	Hamilton Academical	3	1	1
3	Queen's Park	2	1	2
4=	Dumbarton	2	1	1
4=	Inverness Caledonian Thistle	2	1	1
4=	Ross County	2	1	1
5	Livingston	1	4	2
6=	Albion Rovers	1	1	1
6=	Gretna	1	1	1
6=	Rangers	1	1	1

Top ten clubs by total number of seasons (ever) in Top Flight (as of 2025–26)
Rank	Club	No. of seasons
1	Celtic	128
2	Rangers	124
3	Heart of Midlothian	122
4	Hibernian	118
5	St Mirren	114
6	Aberdeen	113
7	Motherwell	109
8	Dundee	100
9	Kilmarnock	95
10	Partick Thistle	85

Top ten clubs by ongoing, successive seasons in Top Flight (as of 2025–26)
Rank	Club	First season of current spell	No. of seasons
1	Celtic	1890–91	128
2	Aberdeen	1905–06	113
3	Motherwell	1985–86	40
4	Rangers	2016–17	9
5	Hibernian	2017–18	8
6	St Mirren	2018–19	7
7	Heart of Midlothian	2020–21	4
7	Kilmarnock	2022–23	4
9	Dundee	2023–24	3
10	Dundee United	2024–25	2

Longest uninterrupted spell in each of the bottom 3 divisions (since 1994–95 league restructure)
Tier	Club	Seasons	Start Season	End Season
Tier Two: Championship	Greenock Morton	11	2015–16	Present
Tier Three: League One	Brechin City	11	2006–07	2016–17
Tier Four: League Two	Elgin City	25	2000–01	Present

Clubs having been Champions of Scotland
Club	First title	Longest time between titles		Years	Current time since last title	
Club	First title	From	Until	Years	Last title won	Years
Dumbarton	1890–91	1890–91	1891–92	1	1891–92	132
Rangers	1890–91	1963–64	1974–75	11	2020–21	3
Celtic	1892–93	1953–54	1965–66	12	2025–26	0
Heart of Midlothian	1894–95	1896–97	1957–58	61	1959–60	64
Hibernian	1902–03	1902–03	1947–48	45	1951–52	72
Third Lanark	1903–04	1903–04			1903–04	120
Motherwell	1931–32	1931–32			1931–32	92
Aberdeen	1954–55	1954–55	1979–80	25	1984–85	39
Dundee	1961–62	1961–62			1961–62	62
Kilmarnock	1964–65	1964–65			1964–65	59
Dundee United	1982–83	1982–83			1982–83	41

*1890–91 title was shared between Dumbarton and Rangers

Titles

- Most top-flight league titles: 56,: Celtic
- Most consecutive league titles: 9, joint record:
  - Celtic (1965–66 to 1973–74)
  - Rangers (1988–89 to 1996–97)
  - Celtic (2011–12 to 2019–20)
- Longest gap between title wins: 61 years, Hearts (1897 to 1958)

Highest top flight finishes without titles
Position	Club	Last season in position	No. of clubs
2nd	Falkirk	1909–10	3
2nd	Greenock Morton	1916–17	3
2nd	Airdrieonians (1878)	1925–26	3
3rd	St Mirren	1979-80	10
3rd	St Bernard's	1893–94	10
3rd	Raith Rovers	1921–22	10
3rd	East Fife	1952–53	10
3rd	Partick Thistle	1962–63	10
3rd	Clyde	1966–67	10
3rd	Dunfermline Athletic	1968–69	10
3rd	Livingston	2001–02	10
3rd	St Johnstone	2012–13	10
3rd	Inverness Caledonian Thistle	2014–15	10
4th	Cambuslang	1890–91	5
4th	Leith Athletic	1891–92	5
4th	Ayr United	1915–16	5
4th	Queen of the South	1933–34	5
4th	Hamilton Academical	1934–35	5
5th	Queen's Park	1928–29	4
5th	Ross County	2012–13	4
5th	Cowdenbeath	1924–25	4
5th	Clydebank (1914)	1919–20	4
6th	Renton	1891–92	1
7th	Abercorn	1890–91	1
8th	Vale of Leven	1890–91	1
9th	Port Glasgow Athletic	1903–04	1
10th	Clydebank (1965)	1985–86	2
10th	Cowlairs	1890–91	2
11th	Albion Rovers	1921–22	2
11th	Arbroath	1937–38	2
12th	Stirling Albion	1958–59	2
12th	Gretna	2007–08	2
18th	East Stirlingshire	1963–64	1
19th	Bo'ness	1927–28	1
20th	Alloa Athletic	1922–23	1

Top-flight appearances

- Most appearances: 127 completed seasons, Celtic (1890–present)

Largest victories

- Largest top flight home win: 11–0, Celtic v Dundee, 26 October 1895
- Largest top flight away win: 1–11, Airdrieonians v Hibernian, 24 October 1959

Streaks

- Longest top flight unbeaten run: 62 games, Celtic (20 November 1915 – 21 April 1917)
  - Longest top flight unbeaten run (games in all national competitions): 69 games (56 in the league), Celtic (15 May 2016 – 13 December 2017)
- Most consecutive top flight wins: 25, Celtic (2003–04)
- Unbeaten league season:
  - Celtic P18 W15 D3 L0, 1897–98
  - Rangers P18 W18 D0 L0, 1898–99
  - Kilmarnock P18 W14 D4 L0, 1898–99 (second tier)
  - Rangers P36 W33 D3 L0, 2013–14(third tier)
  - Celtic P38 W34 D4 L0, 2016–17
  - Rangers P38 W32 D6 L0, 2020–21
  - Falkirk P36 W27 D9 L0, 2023–24 (third tier)

Attendances

- Highest attendance: 118,567 - Rangers v Celtic at Ibrox Park, 2 January 1939

=== Individual ===
Goals

- Most top flight goals in a career: 410, Jimmy McGrory (Celtic 397, Clydebank 13)
- Most top flight goals in a season: 52, Willie MacFadyen (Motherwell, 1931–32)
- Most top flight goals in a game: 8, Jimmy McGrory (Celtic 9 Dunfermline Athletic 0, 14 January 1928)
- Most top flight hat-tricks: 48, Jimmy McGrory

Appearances

- Most top flight appearances: 626, Bob Ferrier (Motherwell)
- Most consecutive appearances with a goal scored: 14, Evelyn Morrison (Falkirk, 1928–29)

Goalkeepers

- Longest consecutive period of time without conceding a goal: 1,256 minutes, Fraser Forster (Celtic, 2013–14)

Titles

- Most league title wins by a manager 18, Bill Struth (Rangers)
- Most league title wins by a player 14, James Forrest (Celtic)

== Scottish Cup ==
=== Team records ===
- Most final wins: 43, Celtic
- Most consecutive final wins: 4, Celtic (2016–17 to 2019–20)
- Most final appearances: 63, Celtic (includes cancelled 1909 fixture)
- Most consecutive final defeats: 3, Vale of Leven (1882–83 to 1884–85)
- Most consecutive final appearances: 8, Rangers (1975–76 to 1982–83)
- Longest gap between final wins: 114 years, Hibernian (1901–02 to 2015–16)
- Most final appearances without winning: 2, Hamilton Academical (1910–11, 1934–35)
- Most final appearances without defeat: 2, St Johnstone (2013–14, 2020–21)
- Longest winning streak in finals: 14, Rangers (1929–30, 1931–32, 1933–34, 1934–35, 1935–36, 1947–48, 1948–49, 1949–50, 1952–53, 1959–60, 1961–62, 1962–63, 1963–64, 1965–66)
- Longest losing streak in finals: 10, Hibernian (1913–14, 1922–23, 1923–24, 1946–47, 1957–58, 1971–72, 1978–79, 2000–01, 2011–12, 2012–13)
- Biggest final wins: 5 goals, joint record:
  - Renton 6–1 Cambuslang, (1887–88)
  - Rangers 5–0 St Mirren, (1933–34)
  - Celtic 6–1 Hibernian, (1971–72)
- Most goals in a final: 7:
  - Renton 6–1 Cambuslang, (1887–88)
  - Celtic 4–3 Queen's Park, (1899–1900)
  - Hearts 4–3 Celtic, (1900–01)
  - Celtic 6–1 Hibernian (1971–72)
  - Motherwell 4–3 Dundee United (1990–91)
- Most goals by a runner-up: 3:
  - Queen's Park: Lost 3–4 against Celtic (1899–1900)
  - Celtic: Lost 3–4 against Hearts (1900–01)
  - Dundee United: Lost 3–4 against Motherwell (1990–91)
  - Hearts: Lost on penalties against Celtic after the game finished 3–3 (aet) (2019–20)
- Most final losses: 19, Rangers (excludes cancelled 1909 fixture)
- Most common pairing in the final: 16, Celtic v Rangers (8 Celtic wins, 7 Rangers wins)1908–09 was withheld)
- Most wins while playing at tier 2 or below: 1, joint record:
  - East Fife, Scottish Division Two (1937–38)
  - Hibernian, Scottish Championship (2015–16)
- Most goals in a game: 36:
  - Arbroath 36–0 Bon Accord (1885–86)
- Largest goalscoring margin:
  - Home: Arbroath 36–0 Bon Accord (1885–86)
  - Away: Redding Athletic 0–17 Camelon (1887–88)

Attendances

- Highest attendance: 146,433, Celtic v Aberdeen at Hampden Park, 24 April 1937 (1936–37)

=== Individual ===
- Most cup final wins by manager: 14, Willie Maley (Celtic)
- Most cup final wins by player 8, Bobby Lennox (Celtic) and James Forrest (Celtic)
- Most overall goals: Jimmy McGrory 77 goals (Celtic 74, Clydebank 3)
- Most Scottish Cup goals in a match: John Petrie 13 (Arbroath 36–0 Bon Accord, 12 September 1885)

== Scottish League Cup ==
=== Team records ===
- Most final wins: 28, Rangers
- Most consecutive final wins: 5, Celtic (1965–66 – 1969–70)
- Most final appearances: 38, Rangers
- Most consecutive final defeats: 4, Celtic (1970–71 – 1973–74)
- Most consecutive final appearances: 14, Celtic (1964–65 – 1977–78)
- Most final appearances without winning: 3, Dunfermline Athletic (1949–50, 1991–92, 2005–06)
- Most final appearances without losing: 3, East Fife (1947–48, 1949–50, 1953–54)
- Longest gap between final wins: 21 years, Aberdeen (1955–56 – 1976–77)
- Longest winning streak in finals: 9, Rangers (1990–91, 1992–93, 1993–94, 1996–97, 1998–99, 2001–02, 2002–03, 2004–05, 2007–08)
- Longest losing streak in finals: 5, joint record:
  - Kilmarnock (1952–53, 1960–61, 1962–63, 2000–01, 2006–07),
  - Dundee United (1981–82, 1984–85, 1997–98, 2007–08, 2014–15)
- Biggest final win: 6 goals:
  - Celtic 7–1 Rangers, (1957–58)
- Most goals in a final: 9:
  - Celtic 6–3 Hibernian, (1974–75)
- Most goals by a runner-up: 3:
  - Dundee: Lost 3–5 against Celtic (1967–68)
  - Hibernian: Lost 3–6 against Celtic (1974–75)
  - Aberdeen: Drew 3–3 against Rangers but lost on penalties (1987–88)
  - Hearts: Lost 3–4 against Rangers (1996–97)
  - Rangers: Drew 3–3 against Celtic but lost on penalties (2024–25)
- Most final losses: 15, Celtic
- Most common pairing in the final: 17, Celtic v Rangers (9 Rangers wins, 8 Celtic wins)
- Most wins while playing at tier 2 or below: 1, joint record:
  - East Fife, Scottish Division B (1947–48)
  - Raith Rovers, Scottish Division One (1994–95)
- Most goals in a game: 13, joint record:
  - Dumbarton 10–3 Stranraer (1957–58)
  - Hibernian 11–2 Alloa Athletic (1965–66)
- Largest goalscoring margin:
  - Home: Hibernian 9–0 Montrose (2003–04)
  - Away: Albion Rovers 1–11 Partick Thistle (1993–94)

Attendances

- Highest attendance: 107,609, Celtic v Rangers at Hampden Park, 25 October 1965 (1965–66)

Individual

- Most cup final wins by manager: 6, Scot Symon (East Fife and Rangers), Jock Stein (Celtic) and Walter Smith (Rangers)
- Most overall goals: Joe Harper 74 goals (Aberdeen 51, Hibernian 16, Morton 7)

== Scottish Challenge Cup ==
=== Team records ===
- Most final wins: 4, Falkirk, and Raith Rovers.
- Most consecutive final wins: 2, Hamilton Academical (1991–92 – 1992–93), and Airdrieonians (2000–01 – 2001–02)
- Most final appearances: 6, Inverness Caledonian Thistle (1999–2000, 2003–04, 2009–10, 2017–18, 2019–20, 2025–26)
- Most consecutive final defeats: 2, Ayr United (1990–91 – 1991–92)
- Most consecutive final appearances: 3, Raith Rovers (2019–20 – 2022–23) (includes cancelled 2019–20 final)
- Most final appearances without winning: 2, Ayr United (1990–91, 1991–92)
- Most final appearances without losing: 4, Falkirk (1993–94, 1997–98, 2004–05, 2011–12)
- Longest gap between final wins: 30 years, Hamilton Academical (1992–93 – 2022–23)
- Longest winning streak in finals: 4, Falkirk (1993–94, 1997–98, 2004–05, 2011–12)
- Longest losing streak in finals: 2, Ayr United (1990–91 – 1991–92)
- Biggest final win: 5 goals:
  - Livingston 5–0 Queen's Park, (2024–25)
- Most goals in a final: 8:
  - Alloa Athletic 4–4 Inverness Caledonian Thistle, (1999–2000)
- Most goals by a runner-up:
  - Inverness Caledonian Thistle: Drew 4–4 against Alloa Athletic; lost on penalties (1999–2000)
- Most final losses: 3, Queen of the South, and Inverness Caledonian Thistle
- Most common pairing in the final: 2, Inverness Caledonian Thistle vs. Raith Rovers (1 shared, 1 Raith win)
- Most wins while playing at tier 3 or below: 1, joint record:
  - Stenhousemuir, Scottish Second Division (1995–96)
  - Stranraer, Scottish Second Division (1996–97)
  - Queen of the South, Scottish Second Division (2012–13)
- Most goals in a game: 14:
  - Ross County 14–0 Heart of Midlothian B (2026–27)
- Largest goalscoring margin:
  - Home: Ross County 14–0 Heart of Midlothian B (2026–27)
  - Away: Dumbarton 0–9 Inverness Caledonian Thistle (2025–26)

Attendances

- Highest attendance: 48,133, Rangers v Peterhead at Hampden Park, 10 April 2016 (1965–66)

Individual

- Most cup final wins by manager: 3, John Robertson (Inverness Caledonian Thistle)

== Transfers ==
=== Record transfer fees paid ===
Rank	Player	From	To	Fee	Date	Notes
1	(Norway) Tore Andre Flo	(England) Chelsea	Rangers	£12,000,000	23 November 2000	
2	(Denmark) Kasper Høgh	(Norway) Bodø/Glimt	Celtic	£11,025,300	28 July 2026	
3	(Belgium) Arne Engels	(Germany) FC Augsburg	Celtic	£10,800,000	31 August 2024	
4	(France) Odsonne Édouard	(France) Paris Saint-Germain	Celtic	£9,000,000	15 June 2018	
5	(Republic of Ireland) Adam Idah	(England) Norwich City	Celtic	£8,250,000	14 August 2024	
6	(Portugal) Youssef Chermiti	(England) Everton	Rangers	£8,000,000	1 September 2025	
7=	(France) Christopher Jullien	(France) Toulouse	Celtic	£7,000,000	28 June 2019	
7=	(England) Ryan Kent	(England) Liverpool	Rangers	£7,000,000	2 September 2019	
8	(England) Michael Ball	(England) Everton	Rangers	£6,500,000	20 August 2001	
9	(Portugal) Jota	(Portugal) Benfica	Celtic	£6,465,000	1 July 2022	
10=	(United States) Cameron Carter-Vickers	(England) Tottenham Hotspur	Celtic	£6,000,000	10 June 2022	
10=	(England) Chris Sutton	(England) Chelsea	Celtic	£6,000,000	11 July 2000	
10=	(Wales) John Hartson	(England) Coventry City	Celtic	£6,000,000	2 August 2001	
10=	(United States) Auston Trusty	(England) Sheffield United	Celtic	£6,000,000	31 August 2024	

=== Record transfer fees received ===
Rank	Player	From	To	Fee	Date	Notes
1	(Denmark) Matt O'Riley	Celtic	(England) Brighton & Hove Albion	£30,000,000	27 August 2024	
2=	(Scotland) Kieran Tierney	Celtic	(England) Arsenal	£25,000,000	8 August 2019	
2=	(Portugal) Jota	Celtic	(Saudi Arabia) Al-Ittihad	£25,000,000	3 July 2023	
4	(France) Moussa Dembélé	Celtic	(France) Olympique Lyonnais	£19,700,000	31 August 2018	
5	(Nigeria) Calvin Bassey	Rangers	(Netherlands) Ajax	£19,580,000	20 July 2022	
6	(Germany) Nicolas Kuhn	Celtic	(Italy) Como	£16,300,000	11 July 2025	
7	(France) Odsonne Édouard	Celtic	(England) Crystal Palace	£14,000,000	31 August 2021	
8	(Norway) Kristoffer Ajer	Celtic	(England) Brentford	£13,500,000	21 July 2021	
9	(Kenya) Victor Wanyama	Celtic	(England) Southampton	£12,500,000	11 July 2013	
10=	(Netherlands) Virgil van Dijk	Celtic	(England) Southampton	£11,500,000	1 September 2015	
10=	(Scotland) Nathan Patterson	Rangers	(England) Everton	£11,500,000	4 January 2022	

=== Record domestic transfer fees ===
Rank	Player	From	To	Fee	Date
1	Scott Brown	Hibernian	Celtic	£4,400,000	1 July 2007
2	Duncan Ferguson	Dundee United	Rangers	£4,000,000	1 July 1993
3=	Steven Whittaker	Hibernian	Rangers	£3,000,000	1 August 2007
3=	Kevin Thomson	Hibernian	Rangers	£3,000,000	1 January 2007
3=	Kenny Miller	Hibernian	Rangers	£3,000,000	1 July 2000
3=	Neil McCann	Heart of Midlothian	Rangers	£3,000,000	14 December 1998
3=	David Turnbull	Motherwell	Celtic	£3,000,000	27 August 2020
8	Phil O'Donnell	Motherwell	Celtic	£2,600,000	1 September 1994
9	Dave McPherson	Heart of Midlothian	Rangers	£2,600,000	1 July 1992
10	Steven Naismith	Kilmarnock	Rangers	£1,900,000	31 August 2007

== Most successful clubs by titles ==
Team	Domestic				European					Total
Team	League titles	Scottish Cup	League Cup	Challenge Cup	Champions League	Cup Winners' Cup	Europa League	Europa Conference League	Super Cup	Total
Celtic	56	43	22	-	1	-	-	-	-	122
Rangers	55	34	28	1	-	1	-	-	-	119
Aberdeen	4	8	6	-	-	1	-	-	1	20
Heart of Midlothian	4	8	4	-	-	-	-	-	-	16
Hibernian	4	3	3	-	-	-	-	-	-	10
Queen's Park	-	10	-	-	-	-	-	-	-	10
Dundee	1	1	3	2	-	-	-	-	-	7
Dundee United	1	2	2	1	-	-	-	-	-	6
St Mirren	-	3	2	1	-	-	-	-	-	6
Falkirk	-	2	-	4	-	-	-	-	-	6
Kilmarnock	1	3	1	-	-	-	-	-	-	5
Raith Rovers	-	-	1	4	-	-	-	-	-	5
Motherwell	1	2	1	-	-	-	-	-	-	4
St Johnstone	-	2	1	1	-	-	-	-	-	4
East Fife	-	1	3	-	-	-	-	-	-	4
Airdrieonians (1878)	-	1	-	3	-	-	-	-	-	4
Inverness Caledonian Thistle	-	1	-	3	-	-	-	-	-	4
Ross County	-	-	1	3	-	-	-	-	-	4
Dumbarton	2	1	-	-	-	-	-	-	-	3
Third Lanark	1	2	-	-	-	-	-	-	-	3
Clyde	-	3	-	-	-	-	-	-	-	3
Livingston	-	-	1	2	-	-	-	-	-	3
Hamilton Academical	-	-	-	3	-	-	-	-	-	3
Dunfermline Athletic	-	2	-	-	-	-	-	-	-	2
Partick Thistle	-	1	1	-	-	-	-	-	-	2
Queen of the South	-	-	-	2	-	-	-	-	-	2
Greenock Morton	-	1	-	-	-	-	-	-	-	1
St Bernard's	-	1	-	-	-	-	-	-	-	1
Alloa Athletic	-	-	-	1	-	-	-	-	-	1
Stenhousemuir	-	-	-	1	-	-	-	-	-	1
Stranraer	-	-	-	1	-	-	-	-	-	1
