= List of Scottish Cup finals =

The Scottish Football Association Challenge Cup, commonly known as the Scottish Cup, is a knockout cup competition in Scottish football. Organised by the Scottish Football Association, it is the third oldest existing football competition in the world, having commenced in the 1873–74 season just two years after the first FA Cup. The winners are awarded the world's oldest trophy, minted in 1885.

Celtic hold the record for most wins with 43, and the most final appearances with 62. Celtic are the current holders, having beaten Dunfermline Athletic in the 2026 final.

== History ==
At the time of the cup's first season Queen's Park were by far the dominant force in Scottish football, and no other team had even managed to score a goal against them until 1875, eight years after their formation. This early dominance meant they were invited into the first FA Cup season and in season 1883–84 they came close to a cup double, winning the Scottish Cup but losing the FA Cup final to Blackburn Rovers. They again met Blackburn Rovers in the following season's final but were defeated once again. Other Scottish teams competed in the FA Cup such as Partick Thistle and 3rd Lanark RV and continued to compete until 1887, when the Scottish Football Association banned its members from taking any further part in the "English Cup". By the time the Scottish Football League was founded in the 1890–91 season, Queen's Park had been eclipsed by many of the league clubs, they finally agreed to enter the competition in the 1900–01 season, they finished seventh in their first season. Their demise was reflected in their Scottish Cup results, although they reached four finals after the foundation of the league they could only win one and their 1893 success was their last, reaching only one more final in 1900. Dumbarton filled the void left by Queen's Park for a time, but like all Scottish football competitions, the Scottish Cup would come to be dominated by the Old Firm of Celtic and Rangers.

In 1909 the cup was withheld by the Scottish Football Association after a riot broke out following a replay between Rangers and Celtic. The first match was drawn 2–2 and the second 1–1.

The cup was not competed for between 1914 and 1919 due to World War I. World War II prevented competition between 1939 and 1945 although the Scottish War Emergency Cup was held in the 1939–40 season.

== Results ==
Scottish Cups by club (%)
1. Celtic – 43 (30.9%)
2. Rangers – 34 (24.5%)
3. Queen's Park – 10 (7.19%)
4. Hearts – 8 (5.75%)
5. Aberdeen – 8 (5.75%)
6. Hibernian – 3 (2.15%)
7. Other clubs – 34 (24.5%)

A draw in the final used to result in the match being replayed at a later date. Since the 1981 final, however, the result has always been decided on the day, with a penalty shoot-out if required after extra time.

=== Key ===
(R)	Replay, or repeat if original match was declared void
(SR)	Second Replay
‡	Match void
*	Match went to extra time
†	Match decided by a penalty shoot-out after extra time
Italics	Team from outside the top level of Scottish football (since the formation of The Scottish Football League in 1890)
**Bold**	Winning team were also Scottish football champions, winning The Double

=== Results ===
Season	Winners	Score	Runners-up	Venue	Attendance	Notes
1873–74	Queen's Park (1)	2–0	Clydesdale	Hampden Park [I]	2,500	
1874–75	Queen's Park (2)	3–0	Renton	Hampden Park [I]	7,000	
1875–76	Queen's Park (3)	1–1	3rd Lanark RV	Hamilton Crescent	6,000	
(R)	Queen's Park (3)	2–0	3rd Lanark RV	Hamilton Crescent	10,000	
1876–77	Vale of Leven (1)	1–1	Rangers	Hamilton Crescent	8,000	
(R)	Vale of Leven (1)	1–1	Rangers	Hamilton Crescent	15,000	
(SR)	Vale of Leven (1)	3–2	Rangers	Hampden Park [I]	12,000	
1877–78	Vale of Leven (2)	1–0	3rd Lanark RV	Hampden Park [I]	5,000	
1878–79	Vale of Leven (3)	1–1	Rangers	Hampden Park [I]	9,000	
(R)	Vale of Leven (3)	walkover	Rangers	Hampden Park [I]		
1879–80	Queen's Park (4)	3–0	Thornliebank	Cathkin Park [I]	4,000	
1880–81	Queen's Park (5)	2–1 ‡	Dumbarton	Kinning Park	15,000	
(R)	Queen's Park (5)	3–1	Dumbarton	Kinning Park	10,000	
1881–82	Queen's Park (6)	2–2	Dumbarton	Cathkin Park [I]	12,500	
(R)	Queen's Park (6)	4–1	Dumbarton	Cathkin Park [I]	14,000	
1882–83	Dumbarton (1)	2–2	Vale of Leven	Hampden Park [I]	15,000	
(R)	Dumbarton (1)	2–1	Vale of Leven	Hampden Park [I]	12,000	
1883–84	Queen's Park (7)	walkover	Vale of Leven	Cathkin Park [I]		
1884–85	Renton (1)	0–0	Vale of Leven	Hampden Park [II]	3,000	
(R)	Renton (1)	3–1	Vale of Leven	Hampden Park [II]	5,500	
1885–86	Queen's Park (8)	3–1	Renton	Cathkin Park [I]	7,000	
1886–87	Hibernian (1)	2–1	Dumbarton	Hampden Park [II]	15,000	
1887–88	Renton (2)	6–1	Cambuslang	Hampden Park [II]	10,000	
1888–89	3rd Lanark RV (1)	3–0 ‡	Celtic	Hampden Park [II]	17,000	
(R)	3rd Lanark RV (1)	2–1	Celtic	Hampden Park [II]	13,000	
1889–90	Queen's Park (9)	1–1	Vale of Leven	Ibrox Park [I]	11,000	
(R)	Queen's Park (9)	2–1	Vale of Leven	Ibrox Park [I]	13,000	
1890–91	Heart of Midlothian (1)	1–0	Dumbarton	Hampden Park [II]	10,836	
1891–92	Celtic (1)	1–0 ‡	Queen's Park	Ibrox Park [I]	40,000	
(R)	Celtic (1)	5–1	Queen's Park	Ibrox Park [I]	26,000	
1892–93	Queen's Park(10)	0–1 ‡	Celtic	Ibrox Park [I]	18,771	
(R)	Queen's Park(10)	2–1	Celtic	Ibrox Park [I]	13,239	
1893–94	Rangers (1)	3–1	Celtic	Hampden Park [II]	17,000	
1894–95	St Bernard's (1)	2–1	Renton	Ibrox Park [I]	10,000	
1895–96	Heart of Midlothian (2)	3–1	Hibernian	New Logie Green	16,034	
1896–97	Rangers (2)	5–1	Dumbarton	Hampden Park [II]	14,000	
1897–98	Rangers (3)	2–0	Kilmarnock	Hampden Park [II]	13,000	
1898–99	Celtic (2)	2–0	Rangers	Hampden Park [II]	25,000	
1899–1900	Celtic (3)	4–3	Queen's Park	Ibrox Park	15,000	
1900–01	Heart of Midlothian (3)	4–3	Celtic	Ibrox Park	15,000	
1901–02	Hibernian (2)	1–0	Celtic	Celtic Park	16,000	
1902–03	Rangers (4)	1–1	Heart of Midlothian	Celtic Park	13,000	
(R)	Rangers (4)	0–0	Heart of Midlothian	Celtic Park	35,000	
(SR)	Rangers (4)	2–0	Heart of Midlothian	Celtic Park	30,000	
1903–04	Celtic (4)	3–2	Rangers	Hampden Park	64,472	
1904–05	Third Lanark (2)	0–0	Rangers	Hampden Park	54,000	
(R)	Third Lanark (2)	3–1	Rangers	Hampden Park	55,000	
1905–06	Heart of Midlothian (4)	1–0	Third Lanark	Ibrox Park	30,000	
1906–07	**Celtic (5)**	3–0	Heart of Midlothian	Hampden Park	50,000	
1907–08	**Celtic (6)**	5–1	St Mirren	Hampden Park	58,000	
1908–09	Cup withheld	2–2	Cup withheld	Hampden Park	70,000	
(R)	Cup withheld	1–1	Cup withheld	Hampden Park	60,000	
1909–10	Dundee (1)	2–2	Clyde	Ibrox Park	60,000	
(R)	Dundee (1)	0–0 *	Clyde	Ibrox Park	25,000	
(SR)	Dundee (1)	2–1	Clyde	Ibrox Park	25,000	
1910–11	Celtic (7)	0–0	Hamilton Academical	Ibrox Park	45,000	
(R)	Celtic (7)	2–0	Hamilton Academical	Ibrox Park	25,000	
1911–12	Celtic (8)	2–0	Clyde	Ibrox Park	45,000	
1912–13	Falkirk (1)	2–0	Raith Rovers	Celtic Park	45,000	
1913–14	**Celtic** (9)	0–0	Hibernian	Ibrox Park	56,000	
(R)	**Celtic** (9)	4–1	Hibernian	Ibrox Park	40,000	
1919–20	Kilmarnock (1)	3–2	Albion Rovers	Hampden Park	95,000	
1920–21	Partick Thistle (1)	1–0	Rangers	Celtic Park	28,294	
1921–22	Morton (1)	1–0	Rangers	Hampden Park	70,000	
1922–23	Celtic (10)	1–0	Hibernian	Hampden Park	82,000	
1923–24	Airdrieonians (1)	2–0	Hibernian	Ibrox Park	65,000	
1924–25	Celtic (11)	2–1	Dundee	Hampden Park	75,317	
1925–26	St Mirren (1)	2–0	Celtic	Hampden Park	98,000	
1926–27	Celtic (12)	3–1	East Fife	Hampden Park	80,070	
1927–28	**Rangers (5)**	4–0	Celtic	Hampden Park	118,115	
1928–29	Kilmarnock (2)	2–0	Rangers	Hampden Park	114,780	
1929–30	**Rangers** (6)	0–0	Partick Thistle	Hampden Park	107,475	
(R)	**Rangers** (6)	2–1	Partick Thistle	Hampden Park	103,688	
1930–31	Celtic (13)	2–2	Motherwell	Hampden Park	104,863	
(R)	Celtic (13)	4–2	Motherwell	Hampden Park	98,509	
1931–32	Rangers (7)	1–1	Kilmarnock	Hampden Park	112,000	
(R)	Rangers (7)	3–0	Kilmarnock	Hampden Park	104,600	
1932–33	Celtic (14)	1–0	Motherwell	Hampden Park	102,339	
1933–34	**Rangers (8)**	5–0	St Mirren	Hampden Park	113,430	
1934–35	**Rangers (9)**	2–1	Hamilton Academical	Hampden Park	87,740	
1935–36	Rangers (10)	1–0	Third Lanark	Hampden Park	88,859	
1936–37	Celtic (15)	2–1	Aberdeen	Hampden Park	147,365	
1937–38	East Fife (1)	1–1	Kilmarnock	Hampden Park	80,091	
(R)	East Fife (1)	4–2 *	Kilmarnock	Hampden Park	92,716	
1938–39	Clyde (1)	4–0	Motherwell	Hampden Park	94,000	
1946–47	Aberdeen (1)	2–1	Hibernian	Hampden Park	82,140	
1947–48	Rangers (11)	1–1 *	Morton	Hampden Park	129,176	
(R)	Rangers (11)	1–0 *	Morton	Hampden Park	133,750	
1948–49	**Rangers (12)**	4–1	Clyde	Hampden Park	108,435	
1949–50	**Rangers (13)**	3–0	East Fife	Hampden Park	118,262	
1950–51	Celtic (16)	1–0	Motherwell	Hampden Park	131,943	
1951–52	Motherwell (1)	4–0	Dundee	Hampden Park	136,274	
1952–53	**Rangers** (14)	1–1	Aberdeen	Hampden Park	129,761	
(R)	**Rangers** (14)	1–0	Aberdeen	Hampden Park	113,700	
1953–54	Celtic (17)	2–1	Aberdeen	Hampden Park	130,060	
1954–55	Clyde (2)	1–1	Celtic	Hampden Park	106,234	
(R)	Clyde (2)	1–0	Celtic	Hampden Park	68,831	
1955–56	Heart of Midlothian (5)	3–1	Celtic	Hampden Park	132,840	
1956–57	Falkirk (2)	1–1	Kilmarnock	Hampden Park	83,000	
(R)	Falkirk (2)	2–1 *	Kilmarnock	Hampden Park	79,785	
1957–58	Clyde (3)	1–0	Hibernian	Hampden Park	95,123	
1958–59	St Mirren (2)	3–1	Aberdeen	Hampden Park	108,591	
1959–60	Rangers (15)	2–0	Kilmarnock	Hampden Park	108,017	
1960–61	Dunfermline Athletic (1)	0–0	Celtic	Hampden Park	113,618	
(R)	Dunfermline Athletic (1)	2–0	Celtic	Hampden Park	87,866	
1961–62	Rangers (16)	2–0	St Mirren	Hampden Park	127,940	
1962–63	**Rangers** (17)	1–1	Celtic	Hampden Park	129,643	
(R)	**Rangers** (17)	3–0	Celtic	Hampden Park	120,273	
1963–64	Rangers (18)	3–1	Dundee	Hampden Park	120,982	
1964–65	Celtic (18)	3–2	Dunfermline Athletic	Hampden Park	108,800	
1965–66	Rangers (19)	0–0	Celtic	Hampden Park	126,552	
(R)	Rangers (19)	1–0	Celtic	Hampden Park	98,202	
1966–67	**Celtic (19)**	2–0	Aberdeen	Hampden Park	126,102	
1967–68	Dunfermline Athletic (2)	3–1	Heart of Midlothian	Hampden Park	56,365	
1968–69	**Celtic (20)**	4–0	Rangers	Hampden Park	132,896	
1969–70	Aberdeen (2)	3–1	Celtic	Hampden Park	108,434	
1970–71	**Celtic** (21)	1–1	Rangers	Hampden Park	120,092	
(R)	**Celtic** (21)	2–1	Rangers	Hampden Park	103,332	
1971–72	**Celtic (22)**	6–1	Hibernian	Hampden Park	106,102	
1972–73	Rangers (20)	3–2	Celtic	Hampden Park	122,714	
1973–74	**Celtic (23)**	3–0	Dundee United	Hampden Park	75,959	
1974–75	Celtic (24)	3–1	Airdrieonians	Hampden Park	75,457	
1975–76	**Rangers (21)**	3–1	Heart of Midlothian	Hampden Park	85,354	
1976–77	**Celtic (25)**	1–0	Rangers	Hampden Park	54,252	
1977–78	**Rangers (22)**	2–1	Aberdeen	Hampden Park	61,563	
1978–79	Rangers (23)	0–0	Hibernian	Hampden Park	50,610	
(R)	Rangers (23)	0–0 *	Hibernian	Hampden Park	33,504	
(SR)	Rangers (23)	3–2 *	Hibernian	Hampden Park	30,602	
1979–80	Celtic (26)	1–0 *	Rangers	Hampden Park	70,303	
1980–81	Rangers (24)	0–0 *	Dundee United	Hampden Park	53,000	
(R)	Rangers (24)	4–1	Dundee United	Hampden Park	43,099	
1981–82	Aberdeen (3)	4–1 *	Rangers	Hampden Park	53,788	
1982–83	Aberdeen (4)	1–0 *	Rangers	Hampden Park	62,979	
1983–84	**Aberdeen (5)**	2–1 *	Celtic	Hampden Park	58,900	
1984–85	Celtic (27)	2–1	Dundee United	Hampden Park	60,346	
1985–86	Aberdeen (6)	3–0	Heart of Midlothian	Hampden Park	62,841	
1986–87	St Mirren (3)	1–0 *	Dundee United	Hampden Park	51,782	
1987–88	**Celtic (28)**	2–1	Dundee United	Hampden Park	74,000	
1988–89	Celtic (29)	1–0	Rangers	Hampden Park	72,069	
1989–90	Aberdeen (7)	0–0 †	Celtic	Hampden Park	60,493	
1990–91	Motherwell (2)	4–3 *	Dundee United	Hampden Park	57,319	
1991–92	**Rangers (25)**	2–1	Airdrieonians	Hampden Park	44,045	
1992–93	**Rangers (26)**	2–1	Aberdeen	Celtic Park	50,715	
1993–94	Dundee United (1)	1–0	Rangers	Hampden Park	37,450	
1994–95	Celtic (30)	1–0	Airdrieonians	Hampden Park	36,915	
1995–96	**Rangers (27)**	5–1	Heart of Midlothian	Hampden Park	37,730	
1996–97	Kilmarnock (3)	1–0	Falkirk	Ibrox Stadium	48,953	
1997–98	Heart of Midlothian (6)	2–1	Rangers	Celtic Park	48,946	
1998–99	**Rangers (28)**	1–0	Celtic	Hampden Park	52,670	
1999–00	**Rangers (29)**	4–0	Aberdeen	Hampden Park	50,865	
2000–01	**Celtic (31)**	3–0	Hibernian	Hampden Park	51,824	
2001–02	Rangers (30)	3–2	Celtic	Hampden Park	51,138	
2002–03	**Rangers (31)**	1–0	Dundee	Hampden Park	47,136	
2003–04	**Celtic (32)**	3–1	Dunfermline Athletic	Hampden Park	50,846	
2004–05	Celtic (33)	1–0	Dundee United	Hampden Park	50,635	
2005–06	Heart of Midlothian (7)	1–1 †	Gretna	Hampden Park	51,232	
2006–07	**Celtic (34)**	1–0	Dunfermline Athletic	Hampden Park	49,600	
2007–08	Rangers (32)	3–2	Queen of the South	Hampden Park	48,821	
2008–09	**Rangers (33)**	1–0	Falkirk	Hampden Park	50,956	
2009–10	Dundee United (2)	3–0	Ross County	Hampden Park	47,122	
2010–11	Celtic (35)	3–0	Motherwell	Hampden Park	49,618	
2011–12	Heart of Midlothian (8)	5–1	Hibernian	Hampden Park	51,041	
2012–13	**Celtic** **(36)**	3–0	Hibernian	Hampden Park	51,254	
2013–14	St Johnstone (1)	2–0	Dundee United	Celtic Park	47,345	
2014–15	Inverness Caledonian Thistle (1)	2–1	Falkirk	Hampden Park	37,149	
2015–16	Hibernian (3)	3–2	Rangers	Hampden Park	50,701	
2016–17	**Celtic** **(37)**	2–1	Aberdeen	Hampden Park	48,713	
2017–18	**Celtic** **(38)**	2–0	Motherwell	Hampden Park	49,967	
2018–19	**Celtic** **(39)**	2–1	Heart of Midlothian	Hampden Park	49,434	
2019–20	**Celtic** **(40)**	3–3 †	Heart of Midlothian	Hampden Park	None (Note: Attendance restricted due to COVID-19 restrictions.)	
2020–21	St Johnstone (2)	1–0	Hibernian	Hampden Park	None	
2021–22	Rangers (34)	2–0 *	Heart of Midlothian	Hampden Park	50,315	
2022–23	**Celtic** **(41)**	3–1	Inverness Caledonian Thistle	Hampden Park	47,247	
2023–24	**Celtic** **(42)**	1–0	Rangers	Hampden Park	48,556	
2024–25	Aberdeen (8)	1–1 †	Celtic	Hampden Park	49,545	
2025–26	**Celtic** **(43)**	3–1	Dunfermline Athletic	Hampden Park	49,613	

== Performance by club ==
Club	Wins	Last win	Runners-up	Last final lost
Celtic (Note: The 1909 Scottish Cup final is not included in this tally, as the cup was withheld that year.)	43	2026	19	2025
Rangers	34	2022	19	2024
Queen's Park	10	1893	2	1900
Aberdeen	8	2025	9	2017
Heart of Midlothian	8	2012	9	2022
Hibernian	3	2016	12	2021
Kilmarnock	3	1997	5	1960
Vale of Leven	3	1879	4	1890
Clyde	3	1958	3	1949
St Mirren	3	1987	3	1962
Dundee United	2	2010	8	2014
Motherwell	2	1991	6	2018
Third Lanark	2	1905	4	1936
Dunfermline Athletic	2	1968	4	2026
Falkirk	2	1957	3	2015
Renton	2	1888	3	1895
St Johnstone	2	2021	—	—
Dumbarton	1	1883	5	1897
Dundee	1	1910	4	2003
Airdrieonians (1878)	1	1924	3	1995
East Fife	1	1938	2	1950
Inverness Caledonian Thistle	1	2015	1	2023
Greenock Morton	1	1922	1	1948
Partick Thistle	1	1921	1	1930
St. Bernard's	1	1895	—	—
Hamilton Academical	—	—	2	1935
Albion Rovers	—	—	1	1920
Cambuslang	—	—	1	1888
Clydesdale	—	—	1	1874
Gretna	—	—	1	2006
Queen of the South	—	—	1	2008
Raith Rovers	—	—	1	1913
Ross County	—	—	1	2010
Thornliebank	—	—	1	1880

=== By city/town ===
City / Town	Wins	Clubs (Note: Clubs in Italics are now defunct.)	Latest win (year)
Glasgow	90	Celtic (43), Rangers (34), Queen's Park (10), Third Lanark (2), Partick Thistle (1)	Celtic (2026)
Edinburgh	12	Heart of Midlothian (8), Hibernian (3), St Bernard's (1)	Hibernian (2016)
Aberdeen	8	Aberdeen (8)	Aberdeen (2025)
Alexandria	3	Vale of Leven (3)	Vale of Leven (1879)
Dundee	3	Dundee United (2), Dundee (1)	Dundee United (2010)
Kilmarnock	3	Kilmarnock (3)	Kilmarnock (1997)
Paisley	3	St Mirren (3)	St Mirren (1987)
Rutherglen	3	Clyde (3)	Clyde (1958)
Dunfermline	2	Dunfermline Athletic (2)	Dunfermline Athletic (1968)
Falkirk	2	Falkirk (2)	Falkirk (1957)
Motherwell	2	Motherwell (2)	Motherwell (1991)
Renton	2	Renton (2)	Renton (1888)
Perth	2	St Johnstone (2)	St Johnstone (2021)
Airdrie	1	Airdrieonians (1)	Airdrieonians (1924)
Dumbarton	1	Dumbarton (1)	Dumbarton (1883)
Greenock	1	Greenock Morton (1)	Greenock Morton (1922)
Inverness	1	Inverness Caledonian Thistle (1)	Inverness Caledonian Thistle (2015)
Methil	1	East Fife (1)	East Fife (1938)

== See also ==
- List of Scottish football champions
- List of Scottish League Cup finals
- Football records in Scotland
