= Dan McMichael =

Irish football manager (c. 1860 – 1919)

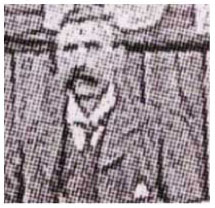
Dan McMichael

Dan McMichael (c. 1860 – 6 February 1919) was an Irish manager, treasurer, secretary and physiotherapist of the Scottish football club Hibernian during the late 19th century and early 20th century. He was also a sprinter in his youth and a referee in Lanarkshire. He is the only manager to have taken charge of Hibs in two separate spells, being the first manager of the club from 1900 to 1903 and returning in 1904 after Phil Kelso left for Arsenal. He subsequently held this position for fifteen years, also making him the club's longest serving manager to date.

He was a saw-miller by trade and settled in Coatbridge in the 1880s before moving to Edinburgh sometime between 1895 and 1898. His brother-in-law, James "Judge" Murphy, was with Hibernian from 1893 to 1903 and seems likely to have started McMichael's connection with Hibs. He was living with Murphy and his father-in-law Thomas Murphy at 20 Ferrier Street, between Easter Road and Leith Central Station, close to the local sawmill. He helped revive the club after it was threatened with closure during the early 1890s. He was appointed secretary for season 1900–01, effectively the manager, and he led the team that won the Scottish Cup in 1902 and the Scottish league championship in 1903. He officially became the club's manager in 1904 after the club became a limited liability company, which meant that the team was no longer run by committee.

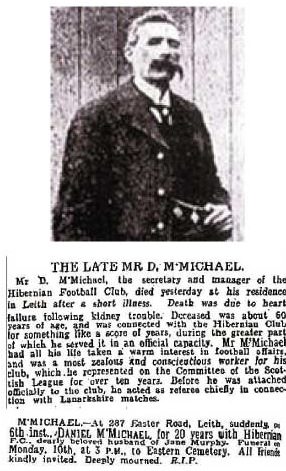
Obituary of Dan McMichael. The text reads: Mr D. M’Michael, the secretary and manager of Hibernian Football Club, died yesterday at his residence in Leith after a short illness. Death was due to heart failure following kidney trouble. Deceased was about 60 years of age, and was connected with the Hibernian Club for something like a score of years, during the greater part of which he served it in an official capacity. Mr M’Michael had all his life taken a warm interest in football affairs and was most zealous and conscientious worker for his club, which he represented on the Committee of the Scottish League for over ten years. before he was attached officially to the club, he acted as referee chiefly in connection with Lanarkshire matches. M’Michael - At 287 Easter Road, Leith, suddenly on 6th inst., DANIEL M’MICHAEL, for 20 years with Hibernian F.C., dearly beloved husband of Jane Murphy. Funeral on Monday 10th, at 3P.M., to Eastern Cemetery. All friends kindly invited. Deeply mourned. R.I.P.

McMichael served as Hibs manager and in other capacities until 1919, when he was one of the casualties of the Spanish flu pandemic. Like many of the pandemic victims, McMichael was buried in an unmarked grave. Several decades later, a group of Hibs supporters found the grave site from local records and raised funds for a gravestone. A dedication ceremony was carried out in December 2013, attended by 400 people.

== Honours ==
Hibernian

- Scottish Cup: 1901–02
- Scottish Cup Runners-Up: 1913–14
- Scottish League: 1902–03

== See also ==
- History of Hibernian F.C.
- List of Scottish Cup winning managers
