= 2022 Scottish Cup final =

Football match

2022 Scottish Cup Final
- Event: 2021–22 Scottish Cup
Rangers	Heart of Midlothian
2	0
- After extra time
- Date: 21 May 2022
- Venue: Hampden Park, Glasgow
- Man of the Match: Calvin Bassey
- Referee: Willie Collum
- Attendance: 50,319

The 2022 Scottish Cup Final was the 137th final of the Scottish Cup and the final of the 2021–22 Scottish Cup, the most prestigious knockout football competition in Scotland. The match was played on 21 May 2022 at Hampden Park, Glasgow. St Johnstone, the defending champions were defeated in Round Four. Rangers beat Heart of Midlothian 2–0 in extra time.

== European place ==
The winner earns the right to play in the 2022–23 UEFA Europa League, entering in the Playoff round. The position of the clubs in the 2021–22 Scottish Premiership rendered this point moot, however, as Rangers had guaranteed a place in the 2022–23 UEFA Champions League, meaning Hearts would secure Europa League qualification by either winning the cup, or by finishing in third place in the league if the place defaulted to the league by Rangers winning the cup.

== Pre-match ==
Going into the 2022 final, Rangers had won the Scottish Cup 33 times from 52 appearances in Scottish Cup finals. The 2022 final is their first appearance in the final since 2016, and were seeking to win the cup for the first time since 2009. Heart of Midlothian had won the Scottish Cup 8 times from 16 appearances in the final. Their most recent appearance in the final was in 2020, and their most recent victory was in 2012. The clubs had previously met in the finals of 1903 (Rangers winning 2–0 in a second replay), 1976 (3–1 for Rangers), 1996 (5–1 for Rangers) and 1998 (2–1 for Hearts).

== Match ==
=== Details ===
21 May 2022
15:00

Rangers	2–0 (a.e.t.)	Heart of Midlothian
Jack 94'; Wright 97'	Report

Hampden Park, Glasgow
Attendance: 50,319
Referee: Willie Collum

Rangers	Hearts

GK	33	(Scotland) Jon McLaughlin		(substituted off) 119'
RB	2	(England) James Tavernier (c)
CB	6	(England) Connor Goldson
CB	26	(Nigeria) Leon Balogun
LB	3	(Nigeria) Calvin Bassey
CM	10	(Northern Ireland) Steven Davis		(substituted off) 81'
CM	4	(England) John Lundstram
CM	37	(Canada) Scott Arfield		(substituted off) 81'
RW	9	(Ivory Coast) Amad	(yellow card) 59'	(substituted off) 63'
CF	17	(Nigeria) Joe Aribo		(substituted off) 106'
LW	14	(England) Ryan Kent
Substitutes:
GK	1	(Scotland) Allan McGregor		(substituted on) 119'
DF	43	(Scotland) Leon King
MF	8	(Scotland) Ryan Jack		(substituted on) 81'
MF	16	(Wales) Aaron Ramsey
MF	18	(Finland) Glen Kamara		(substituted on) 81'
MF	51	(Scotland) Alex Lowry
MF	19	(United States) James Sands
FW	11	(Switzerland) Cedric Itten
FW	23	(Scotland) Scott Wright		(substituted on) 63'
FW	25	(Jamaica) Kemar Roofe
FW	30	(Zambia) Fashion Sakala		(substituted on) 106'
Manager:
(Netherlands) Giovanni van Bronckhorst

GK	1	(Scotland) Craig Gordon (c)
CB	4	(Scotland) John Souttar
CB	19	(Scotland) Craig Halkett	(yellow card) 106'
CB	3	(Scotland) Stephen Kingsley
RM	12	(Australia) Nathaniel Atkinson
CM	5	(Austria) Peter Haring	(yellow card) 4'
CM	14	(Australia) Cameron Devlin		(substituted off) 106'
LM	17	(England) Alex Cochrane		(substituted off) 100'
AM	10	(Northern Ireland) Liam Boyce		(substituted off) 76'
CF	20	(England) Ellis Simms
CF	18	(Scotland) Barrie McKay		(substituted off) 82'
Substitutes:
GK	13	(Scotland) Ross Stewart
DF	2	(Northern Ireland) Michael Smith
DF	15	(England) Taylor Moore
DF	21	(England) Toby Sibbick
MF	8	(Republic of Ireland) Aaron McEneff		(substituted on) 106'
MF	9	(Wales) Ben Woodburn
MF	11	(Scotland) Gary Mackay-Steven		(substituted on) 100'
MF	16	(Scotland) Andy Halliday		(substituted on) 76'
MF	30	(England) Josh Ginnelly		(substituted on) 82'
Manager:
(Scotland) Robbie Neilson

Match rules

- 90 minutes
- 30 minutes of extra time if necessary
- Penalty shoot-out if scores still level
- Eleven named substitutes
- Maximum of five substitutions in normal time (a sixth substitute is permitted in extra time)

== Media coverage ==
BBC Scotland and Premier Sports obtained the rights to broadcast the final, in what is the fourth season of a six-year deal in the United Kingdom to broadcast Scottish Cup matches.
