= 2024 Scottish Cup final =

Football match

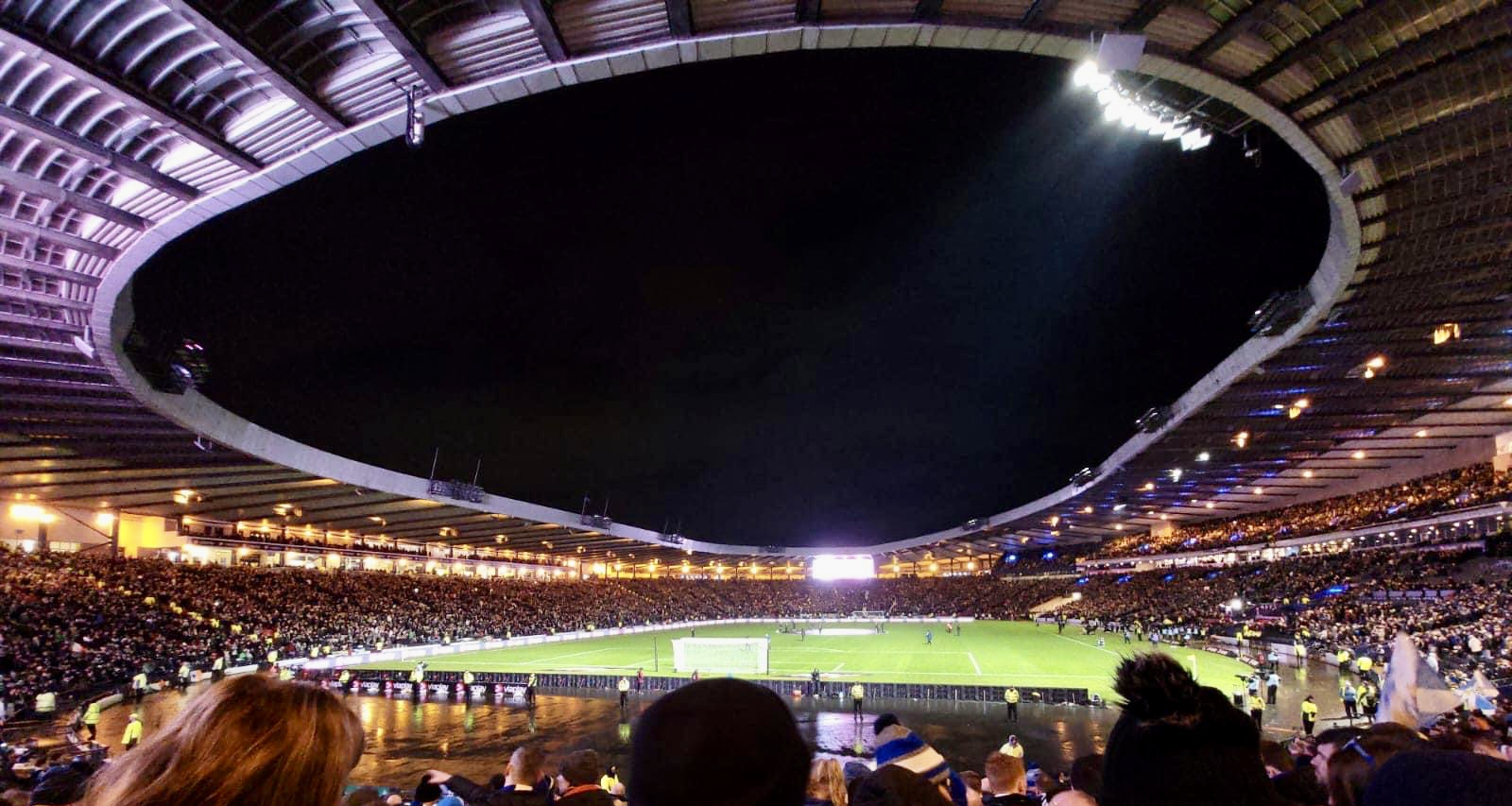
- The match took place at Hampden Park
- Event: 2023–24 Scottish Cup
Celtic	Rangers
1	0
- Date: 25 May 2024
- Venue: Hampden Park, Glasgow
- Referee: Nick Walsh
- Attendance: 48,556

The 2024 Scottish Cup final was the final match of the 2023–24 Scottish Cup, the 139th edition of Scotland's most prestigious knockout football competition. It was contested by Celtic and Rangers at Hampden Park, Glasgow, on 25 May 2024.

== Background ==
The 2024 final was Celtic's 61st appearance in a Scottish Cup final (a national record), while it was the 54th final appearance by Rangers. It was the 441st meeting between the Old Firm rivals and the first in a Scottish Cup final since 2002.

== Road to the final ==
Celtic		Round	Rangers	
Opposition	Score	Round	Opposition	Score
Buckie Thistle (H)	5–0	4th	Dumbarton (A)	4–1
St Mirren (A)	2–0	5th	Ayr United (H)	2–0
Livingston (H)	4–2	QF	Hibernian (A)	2–0
Aberdeen (N)	3–3 (a.e.t.) (6–5 pen.)	SF	Heart of Midlothian (N)	2–0
Key: (H) = Home venue; (A) = Away venue; (N) = Neutral venue

== Match ==
=== Summary ===
The only goal of the game came in the 90th minute, substitute Adam Idah scored from six yards out after Rangers goalkeeper Jack Butland had parried a shot from Paulo Bernardo back into his path.

=== Details ===
25 May 2024
15:00 BST

Celtic	1–0	Rangers
Idah 90'

Hampden Park, Glasgow
Attendance: 48,556
Referee: Nick Walsh

Celtic	Rangers

GK	1	(England) Joe Hart	(yellow card) 61'
RB	2	(Canada) Alistair Johnston
CB	20	(United States) Cameron Carter-Vickers
CB	5	(Republic of Ireland) Liam Scales
LB	3	(Scotland) Greg Taylor	(yellow card) 73'
CM	33	(Denmark) Matt O'Riley
CM	42	(Scotland) Callum McGregor (c)	(yellow card) 41'
CM	41	(Japan) Reo Hatate		(substituted off) 78'
RW	49	(Scotland) James Forrest	(yellow card) 68'	(substituted off) 71'
CF	8	(Japan) Kyogo Furuhashi		(substituted off) 62'
LW	38	(Japan) Daizen Maeda	(yellow card) 90+4'
Substitutes:
GK	29	(Scotland) Scott Bain
FW	7	(Honduras) Luis Palma
FW	9	(Republic of Ireland) Adam Idah	(yellow card) 63'	(substituted on) 62'
FW	10	(Germany) Nicolas Kühn	(yellow card) 90+1'	(substituted on) 71'
DF	17	(Poland) Maik Nawrocki
MF	24	(Japan) Tomoki Iwata
MF	28	(Portugal) Paulo Bernardo		(substituted on) 78'
DF	56	(Scotland) Anthony Ralston
DF	57	(Scotland) Stephen Welsh
Manager:
(Northern Ireland) Brendan Rodgers

GK	1	(England) Jack Butland
RB	2	(England) James Tavernier (c)
CB	27	(Nigeria) Leon Balogun
CB	26	(England) Ben Davies
LB	3	(Turkey) Rıdvan Yılmaz	(yellow card) 84'
CM	42	(Ivory Coast) Mohamed Diomande
CM	43	(Belgium) Nicolas Raskin	(yellow card) 90+2'	(substituted off) 90+4'
RW	21	(England) Dujon Sterling	(yellow card) 62'	(substituted off) 81'
AM	13	(England) Todd Cantwell	(yellow card) 74'	(substituted off) 74'
LW	7	(Portugal) Fábio Silva		(substituted off) 74'
CF	9	(Nigeria) Cyriel Dessers		(substituted off) 46'
Substitutes:
GK	28	(Scotland) Robby McCrorie
MF	4	(England) John Lundstram		(substituted on) 90+4'
MF	8	(Scotland) Ryan Jack
FW	17	(Wales) Rabbi Matondo		(substituted on) 74'
FW	19	(Senegal) Abdallah Sima	(yellow card) 54'	(substituted on) 46'
MF	20	(England) Kieran Dowell
FW	23	(Scotland) Scott Wright		(substituted on) 74'
FW	45	(Northern Ireland) Ross McCausland		(substituted on) 81'
MF	93	(Scotland) Cole McKinnon
Manager:
(Belgium) Philippe Clement

Match rules

- 90 minutes
- 30 minutes of extra time if necessary
- Penalty shoot-out if scores still level
- Nine named substitutes
- Maximum of five substitutions in normal time (a sixth substitute is permitted in extra time)

== Media coverage ==
BBC Scotland and Premier Sports broadcast the final, in what was the final season of a six-year deal in the United Kingdom to broadcast Scottish Cup matches.
