= 2026 Scottish Cup final =

Football match

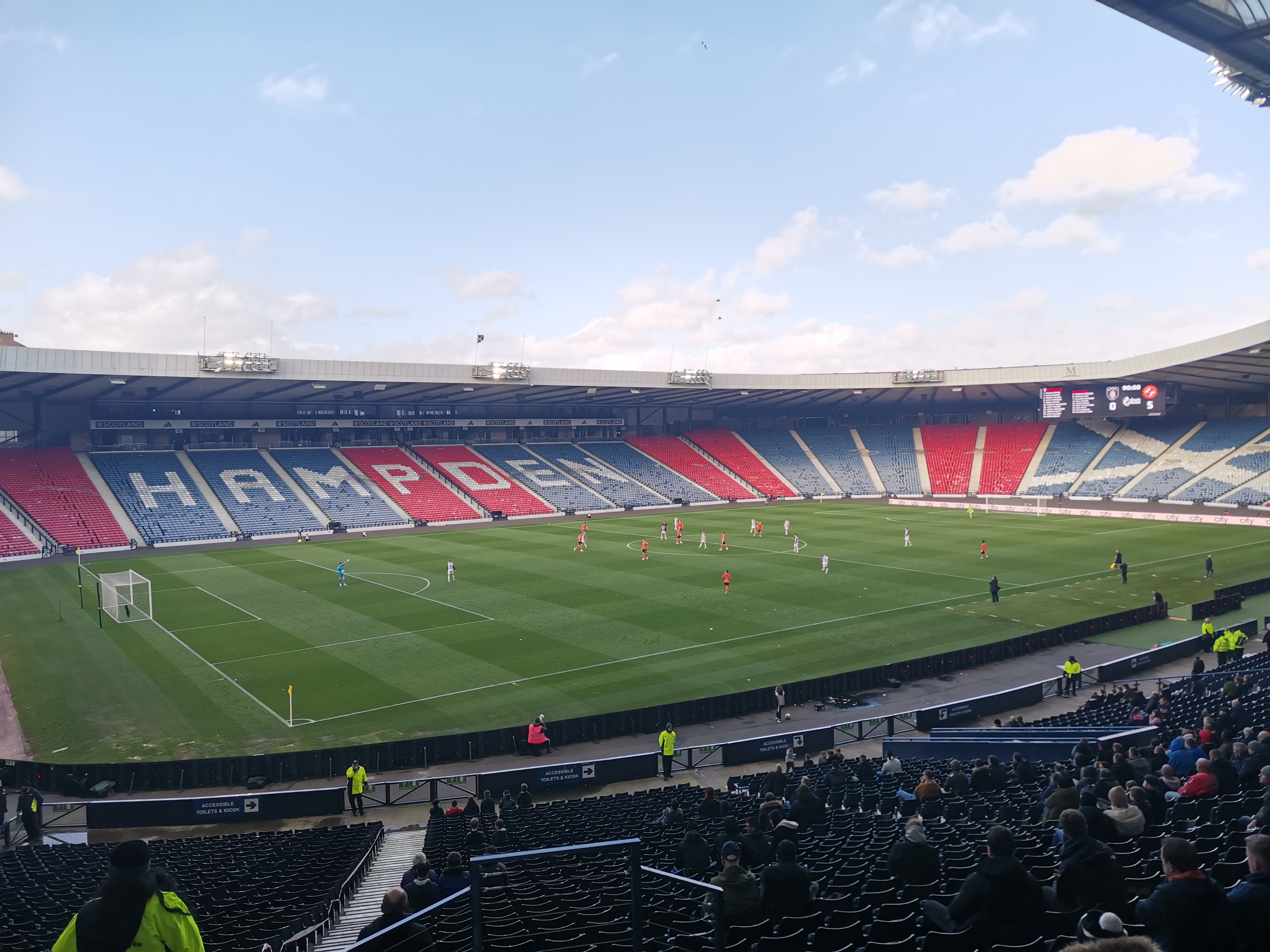
- The match took place at Hampden Park
- Event: 2025–26 Scottish Cup
| Celtic | Dunfermline Athletic |
| 3 | 1 |
- Date: 23 May 2026
- Venue: Hampden Park, Glasgow
- Referee: Steven McLean
- Attendance: 49,613

The 2026 Scottish Cup final was the final match of the 2025–26 Scottish Cup, the 141st edition of Scotland's most prestigious knockout football competition. It was contested by 42-time winners Celtic and two-time winners Dunfermline Athletic at Hampden Park, Glasgow, on 23 May 2026.

Cetic won the game 3-1 to complete the domestic double for the 14th time.

== Background ==
The match was Dunfermline Athletic's sixth appearance in a Scottish Cup final, their fifth against Celtic (the sides having met in 1961, 1965, 2004 and 2007) and first since the latter. Celtic made their 63rd Scottish Cup final appearance and returned after losing on penalties to Aberdeen in the 2025 iteration.

== Road to the final ==
| Celtic | | Round | Dunfermline Athletic | |
| Opposition | Score | Round | Opposition | Score |
|---|---|---|---|---|
| — | — | 3rd | Queen of the South (H) | 2–1 |
| Auchinleck Talbot (A) | 0–2 | 4th | Hibernian (H) | 1–0 |
| Dundee (H) | 2–1 (a.e.t.) | 5th | Kelty Hearts (H) | 2–0 |
| Rangers (A) | 0–0 (a.e.t.) (2–4p) | QF | Aberdeen (H) | 3–0 |
| St Mirren (N) | 6–2 (a.e.t.) | SF | Falkirk (N) | 0–0 (a.e.t.) (4–2p) |
Key: (H) = Home venue; (A) = Away venue; (N) = Neutral venue

== Match ==
=== Summary ===
In the 19th minute, Celtic took the lead when Daizen Maeda got in on goal before lobbing the ball over the advancing Dunfermline goalkeeper Aston Oxborough from just outside the penalty area. Arne Engels made it 2-0 in the 36th minute when he scored with a right foot shot from outside the penalty area low to the right corner of the net. In the 73rd minute, Kelechi Iheanacho got a third goal for Celtic when he received a pass from Benjamin Nygren before turning in on his left foot, past the goalkeeper before scoring low to the left corner from six yards out. Dunfermline pulled a goal back in the 80th minute when Josh Cooper scored from six yards out with a side foot finish low to the left of the net.

=== Details ===
23 May 2026
15:00 BST

| Celtic | 3–1 | Dunfermline Athletic |
|---|---|---|
| Maeda 19'; Engels 36'; Iheanacho 73' | Report | Cooper 80' |

Hampden Park, Glasgow
Attendance: 49,613
Referee: Steven McLean

| GK | 12 | (Finland) Viljami Sinisalo |
| RB | 2 | (Canada) Alistair Johnston |
| CB | 6 | (United States) Auston Trusty | (yellow card) 53' |
| CB | 5 | (Republic of Ireland) Liam Scales |
| LB | 63 | (Scotland) Kieran Tierney | | (substituted off) 75' |
| CM | 42 | (Scotland) Callum McGregor (c) |
| CM | 27 | (Belgium) Arne Engels |
| RW | 49 | (Scotland) James Forrest | | (substituted off) 58' |
| AM | 8 | (Sweden) Benjamin Nygren | | (substituted off) 75' |
| LW | 13 | (South Korea) Yang Hyun-jun | | (substituted off) 75' |
| CF | 38 | (Japan) Daizen Maeda |
Substitutes:
| GK | 31 | (Scotland) Ross Doohan |
| DF | 36 | (Uruguay) Marcelo Saracchi | | (substituted on) 85' |
| DF | 47 | (Scotland) Dane Murray |
| DF | 56 | (Scotland) Anthony Ralston |
| MF | 14 | (Scotland) Luke McCowan |
| MF | 21 | (England) Alex Oxlade-Chamberlain | | (substituted on) 75' |
| FW | 17 | (Nigeria) Kelechi Iheanacho | | (substituted on) 58' |
| FW | 19 | (Wales) Callum Osmand |
| FW | 23 | (Tunisia) Sebastian Tounekti | | (substituted on) 75' |
Manager:
(Northern Ireland) Martin O'Neill

| GK | 13 | (England) Aston Oxborough |
| CB | 2 | (Scotland) Jeremiah Chilokoa-Mullen (c) |
| CB | 31 | (Scotland) John Tod | | (substituted off) 46' |
| CB | 3 | (Trinidad and Tobago) Kieran Ngwenya |
| RWB | 10 | (Scotland) Matty Todd | | (substituted off) 79' |
| LWB | 47 | (Scotland) Robbie Fraser |
| CM | 35 | (England) Tashan Oakley-Boothe | | (substituted off) 46' |
| CM | 18 | (Ghana) Nurudeen Abdulai | | (substituted off) 59' |
| CM | 8 | (Scotland) Charlie Gilmour | (yellow card) 40' |
| CF | 38 | (Scotland) Callumn Morrison | | (substituted off) 46' |
| CF | 26 | (Scotland) Andrew Tod |
Substitutes:
| GK | 40 | (England) Billy Terrell |
| DF | 4 | (Scotland) Kyle Benedictus |
| DF | 11 | (Northern Ireland) Shea Kearney | | (substituted on) 46' |
| MF | 14 | (Mozambique) Alfons Amade | | (substituted on) 59' |
| MF | 24 | (Republic of Ireland) Graham Carey |
| MF | 33 | (Scotland) Josh Cooper | | (substituted on) 79' |
| FW | 9 | (Scotland) Zak Rudden | | (substituted on) 46' |
| FW | 20 | (Scotland) Chris Kane | | (substituted on) 46' |
| FW | 34 | (Scotland) Lucas Fyfe |
Manager:
(Northern Ireland) Neil Lennon

Match rules

- 90 minutes
- 30 minutes of extra time if necessary
- Penalty shoot-out if scores still level
- Nine named substitutes
- Maximum of five substitutions in normal time (a sixth substitute is permitted in extra time)

== Media coverage ==
BBC Scotland and Premier Sports broadcast the final, in what is the second season of a new five-year deal in the United Kingdom to broadcast Scottish Cup matches.
