= Scottish Cup =

Association football tournament in Scotland

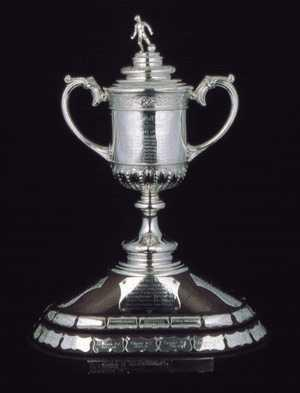
- Founded: 1873; 153 years ago
- Region: Scotland; England (2 teams)
- Teams: 137 (2026–27)
- Qualifier for: UEFA Europa League
- Current champions: Celtic (43rd title)
- Most championships: Celtic (43 titles)
- Website: scottishfa.co.uk
- 2026–27 Scottish Cup

The Scottish Football Association Challenge Cup, commonly known as the Scottish Cup, is an annual association football knock-out cup competition for men's football clubs in Scotland. The competition was first held in 1873–74. Entry is open to all 134 clubs with full membership of the Scottish Football Association (SFA), along with up to eight other clubs who are associate members. The competition is called Scottish Gas Men's Scottish Cup for sponsorship reasons.

Although it is the second-oldest competition in association football history, after the English FA Cup, the Scottish Cup trophy is the oldest in association football and is also the oldest national trophy in the world. It was first presented to Queen's Park, who won the final match of the inaugural tournament in March 1874. The current holders are Celtic, who won the tournament by defeating Dunfermline Athletic in the 2026 final.

== Format ==
The tournament starts at the beginning of the Scottish football season, in August. The Scottish Cup Final is usually the last game of the season, taking place at the end of May. Participating teams enter the tournament at different stages depending on their league ranking. The lowest ranked clubs enter the tournament at the preliminary round whilst the highest ranked, those that compete in the Scottish Premiership, enter at the fourth round stage in January.

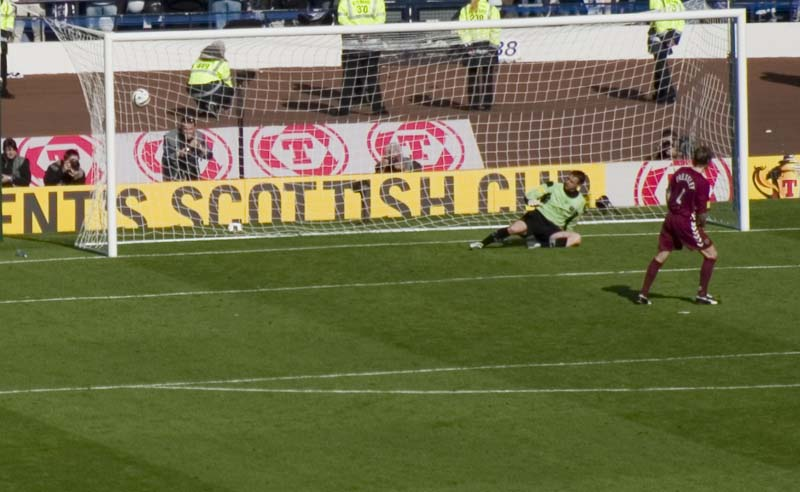
The 2006 final between Heart of Midlothian and Gretna was decided by a penalty shoot-out.

The competition is a knock-out tournament. In each round of games, the teams are paired at random, with the first team drawn listed as the home team. Every game lasts 90 minutes plus any additional stoppage time. The winner of each game advances to the next round, whilst the loser is eliminated from the tournament. In prior seasons, if a game ended in a draw before the fourth round, the fixture was replayed at the home ground of the other team at a later date, before the fourth round. If the replay also ended in a draw, a penalty shoot-out took place to decide the winner. From the fourth round onwards, if the game ended in a draw there was no replay; 30 minutes of extra time would be played, followed by a penalty shoot-out if there is still no winner. Following a vote by the Scottish FA's member clubs in August 2022, it was decided that, for the 2022—23 competition, there would be no replays following the preliminary round, extra time and penalties will be used to decide the winner of drawn games from Round One onwards.

The competition has a staggered entry system. The preliminary rounds are contested by qualifiers and clubs who are compete in a league below tier 5 in the Scottish pyramid. Eighteen Highland League and thirty-two Lowland League clubs begin in the first round. Ten Scottish League Two clubs enter the second round. Scottish League One and Scottish Championship clubs start in the third round, then finally twelve Scottish Premiership clubs enter in the fourth round.

=== Eligible clubs and players ===
Any club that is a full or associate member of the Scottish Football Association (SFA) is entitled to compete in the tournament. Full members qualify automatically, which includes every team that plays in the Scottish Professional Football League (SPFL), Highland League, and Lowland League. Between 1895 and 2007, clubs that were SFA members but not competitors in the country's professional football leagues could only qualify for the tournament through the Scottish Qualifying Cup.

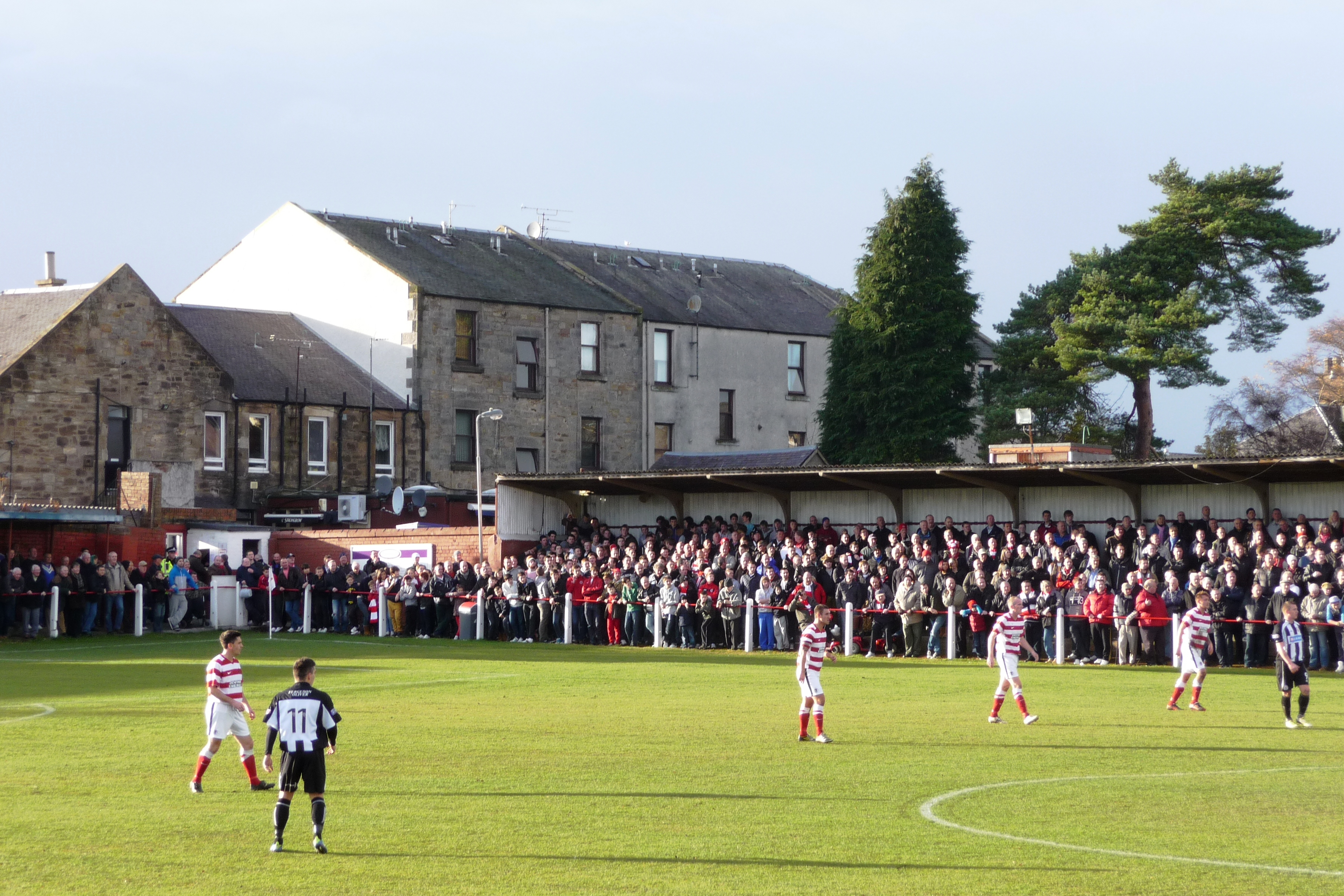
Former junior club Bonnyrigg Rose (in red) qualified to compete by winning the SJFA East Superleague in 2012.

Clubs which are not full members of the SFA may still qualify for the tournament by winning one of the six leagues at tier 6 in the Scottish football league system (East, Midlands, North Caledonian, North Region, South, West) or the East, South and West of Scotland Cup-Winners Shield. Clubs that are members of the Scottish Junior Football Association (SJFA) have been able to qualify since 2007 by winning the Scottish Junior Cup. And, since 2015, the winners of the Scottish Amateur Cup are also eligible to qualify.

Players that are registered with a competing club are eligible to play, however, cannot represent more than one club during the same tournament. Each club names eleven players and up to seven substitutes before every match. In order to play in the final match, a player must have also been registered to compete in the semi-final round for the same club. If a club fields a player that is not registered, the club may be expelled from the tournament.

=== Venues ===
Before the semi-final and final rounds, the venue of each match is determined when the fixtures are drawn; the first club drawn in a fixture is named the home team and chooses the venue for the match, usually its own home ground. In the event of a game ending in a draw, the venue for the replay is the home ground of the second club drawn. The semi-final ties are played at a neutral venue; usually Hampden Park in Glasgow. On occasions when Hampden has been unavailable, such as when it was being renovated in the late 1990s and when it was being transformed into an athletics stadium for the 2014 Commonwealth Games, the semi-finals have been hosted at Celtic Park and Ibrox Stadium, also in Glasgow.

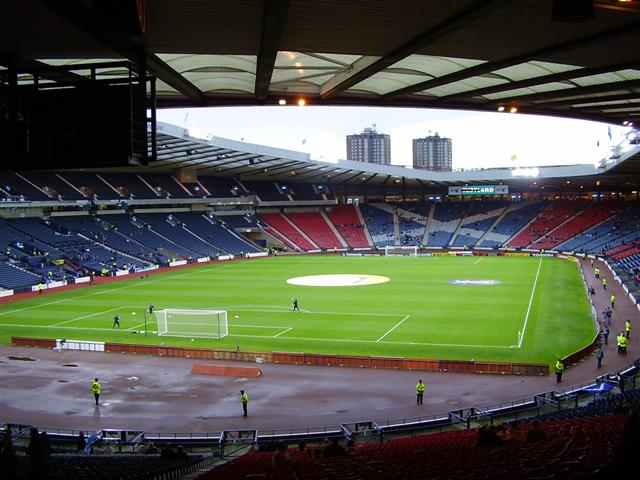
The semi-final and final games are hosted at Hampden Park.

Hampden Park also usually hosts the final match of the tournament. The venue – across three sites in close proximity bearing the name – has hosted the majority of finals including the first in 1874. Other venues that have hosted the final in the tournament's early years are Hamilton Crescent, Kinning Park and the first Cathkin Park; all in Glasgow (although just outside the city boundaries at the time). The last game of the 1896 tournament is the only final that has been hosted outside Glasgow when rivals Heart of Midlothian and Hibernian played at New Logie Green in Edinburgh. Hampden Park has held world and European records for the highest attendance, some of which were recorded at Scottish Cup games. The 1937 final played between Aberdeen and Celtic attracted a crowd of 147,365 spectators which was a world record for a national cup final and remains a European record.

=== European qualification ===
As Scotland is a member of the Union of European Football Associations (UEFA), the winner of the Scottish Cup qualifies to compete in European-wide competitions organised by UEFA. Between 1960 and 1998, the Scottish Cup winners qualified for the UEFA Cup Winners' Cup along with winners of other domestic cup competitions across Europe before it was abolished. The Scottish Cup winners now qualify to compete in the following season's UEFA Europa League (formerly known as the UEFA Cup). It is possible for the Scottish Cup winners to have already qualified for a UEFA competition through their league ranking in the Scottish Premiership. In this scenario, the qualification spot passes to the highest ranked team in that competition not yet qualified, rather than to the Scottish Cup runners-up. Until 2014, the Scottish Cup runners-up qualified for European competition if the cup winners had also qualified for the Champions League.

== History ==
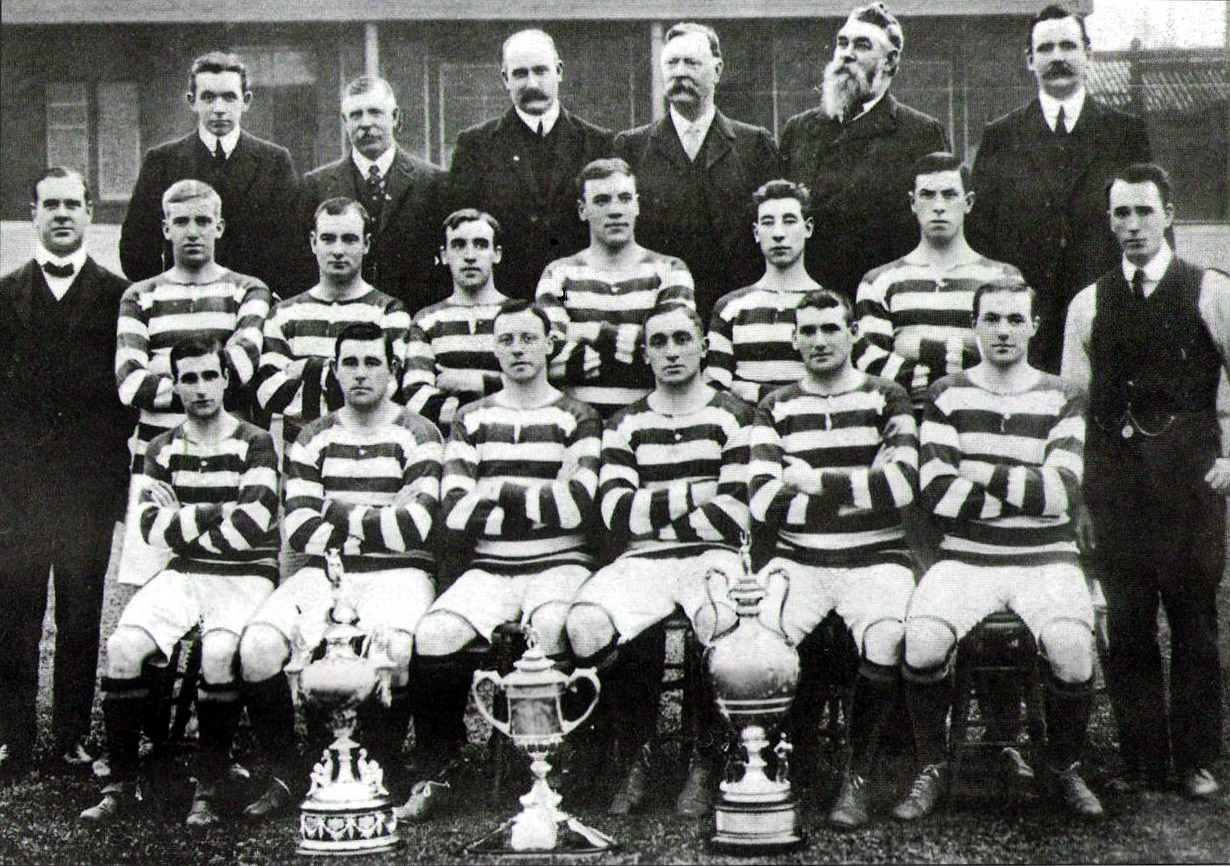
Celtic F.C. are the side with the most Scottish Cup victories. The trophy is pictured second from left, alongside the 1907–08 team

The Scottish Football Association was founded in 1873 and the Scottish Cup was created as an annual competition for its members. The first Scottish Cup match took place on 18 October 1873 when Renton defeated Kilmarnock 2–0 in the first round. In its early years, the competition was dominated by Queen's Park who won the final 10 times in the first twenty years. Vale of Leven, Dumbarton and Renton were also successful during this period. In 1885, the record margin of victory in the tournament was recorded when Arbroath defeated Bon Accord 36–0 in a first round match. It was also the highest scoring professional football game recorded in history.

=== Trophy ===
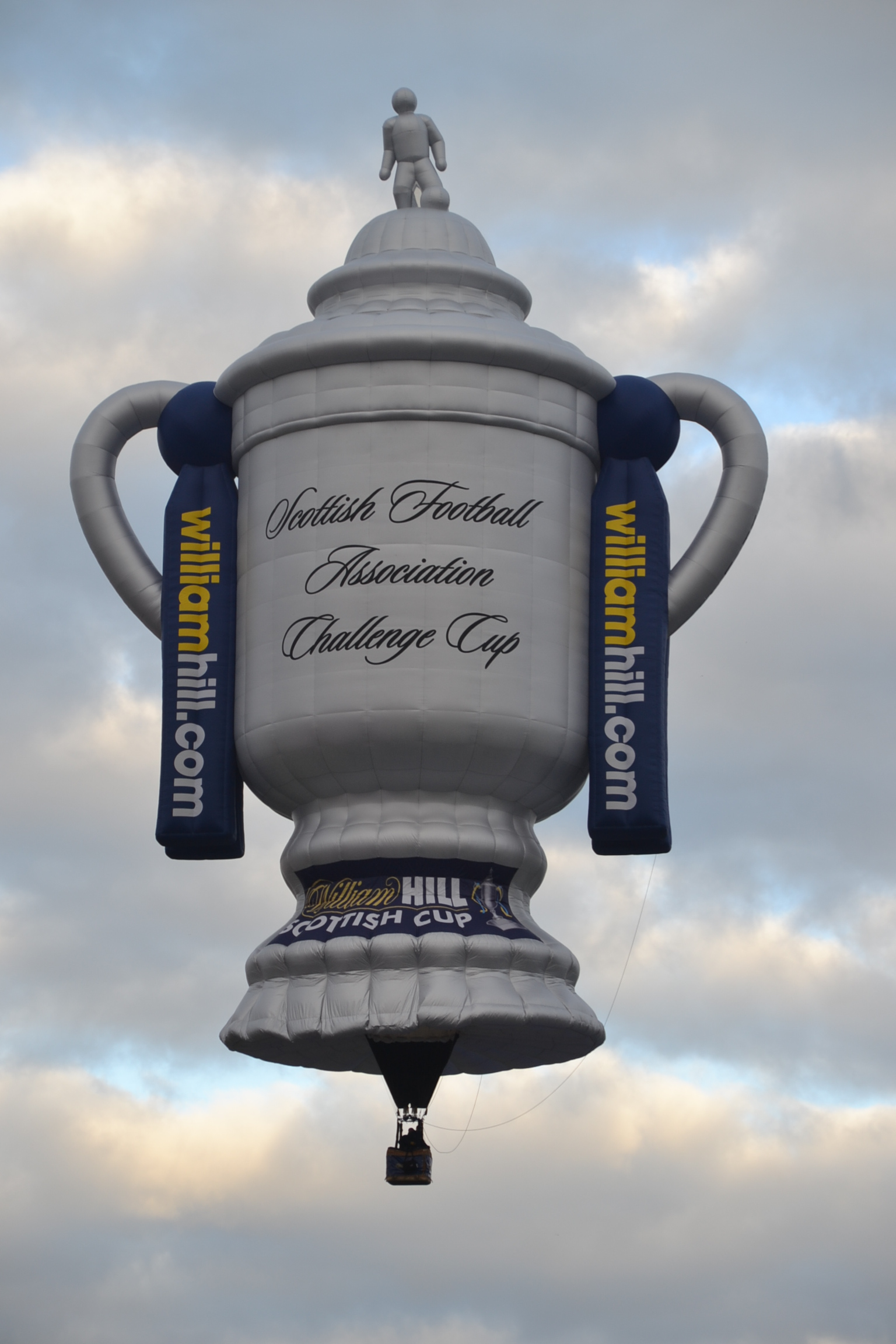
Balloon in the shape of the Scottish Cup trophy (2013)

The Scottish Cup trophy is the oldest surviving national trophy and also the oldest surviving association football trophy in the world. (The original FA Cup trophy predated it, but was stolen in 1895 and never recovered.) It was made by silversmith Martin Hall & Co in London in 1873 and has been presented to the winners of the tournament since 1874. The solid silver trophy is 50 cm (1 ft 8 in) in height and weighs 2.25 kg (72 ozt). The original trophy is displayed at the Scottish Football Museum at Hampden Park. It is removed once each year to be cleaned and presented to the tournament winners. After the presentation ceremony, the trophy is returned to the museum. A replica of the original trophy is given to the tournament winners after the ceremony and is also used for promotional purposes.

== Performances ==
=== By club ===
A total of 34 clubs have appeared in the final, of whom 25 have won the competition. The most successful club in terms of wins and appearances in the final is Celtic, with 43 wins from 62. Rangers and Celtic have finished runners-up on more occasions than any other club with 19 defeats in the final. The most recent winner is Celtic, who defeated Dunfermline Athletic in the 2026 final.

Final appearances by club (Clubs in italics are defunct)
Club	Wins	Last final won	Runners-up	Last final lost	Total final appearances (Note: These tallies include the appearance of Celtic and Rangers in the 1909 final, although neither club was declared the winner or runner-up.)
Celtic	43	2026	19	2025	62
Rangers	34	2022	19	2024	54
Queen's Park	10	1893	2	1900	12
Aberdeen	8	2025	9	2017	17
Heart of Midlothian	8	2012	9	2022	17
Hibernian	3	2016	12	2021	15
Kilmarnock	3	1997	5	1960	8
Vale of Leven	3	1879	4	1890	7
St Mirren	3	1987	3	1962	6
Clyde	3	1958	3	1949	6
Dundee United	2	2010	8	2014	10
Motherwell	2	1991	6	2018	8
Third Lanark	2	1905	4	1936	6
Dunfermline Athletic	2	1968	4	2026	6
Falkirk	2	1957	3	2015	5
Renton	2	1888	3	1895	5
St Johnstone	2	2021	—	—	2
Dumbarton	1	1883	5	1897	6
Dundee	1	1910	4	2003	5
Airdrieonians (1878)	1	1924	3	1995	4
East Fife	1	1938	2	1950	3
Greenock Morton	1	1922	1	1948	2
Partick Thistle	1	1921	1	1930	2
Inverness Caledonian Thistle	1	2015	1	2023	2
St Bernard's	1	1895	—	—	1
Hamilton Academical	—	—	2	1935	2
Ross County	—	—	1	2010	1
Queen of the South	—	—	1	2008	1
Gretna	—	—	1	2006	1
Albion Rovers	—	—	1	1920	1
Raith Rovers	—	—	1	1913	1
Cambuslang	—	—	1	1888	1
Thornliebank	—	—	1	1880	1
Clydesdale	—	—	1	1874	1

=== Domestic double and treble ===
Clubs that win the Scottish Cup can complete a domestic "double" by becoming Scottish league champions in the same season. Only three clubs have won both competitions in the same season. Celtic have completed the domestic league and Scottish Cup double on 22 occasions, followed by Rangers on 18. The only other Scottish club to achieve this feat was Aberdeen, in 1983–84. Since the creation of the Scottish League Cup in 1947, clubs can complete a domestic treble by also winning this tournament in the same season. Celtic have achieved this feat on eight occasions, a world record achieved in 2023. Celtic won four consecutive domestic trebles ("quadruple treble") in 2016–17, 2017–18, 2018–19 and 2019–20. No team had previously won consecutive trebles.

=== Cup "shocks" ===
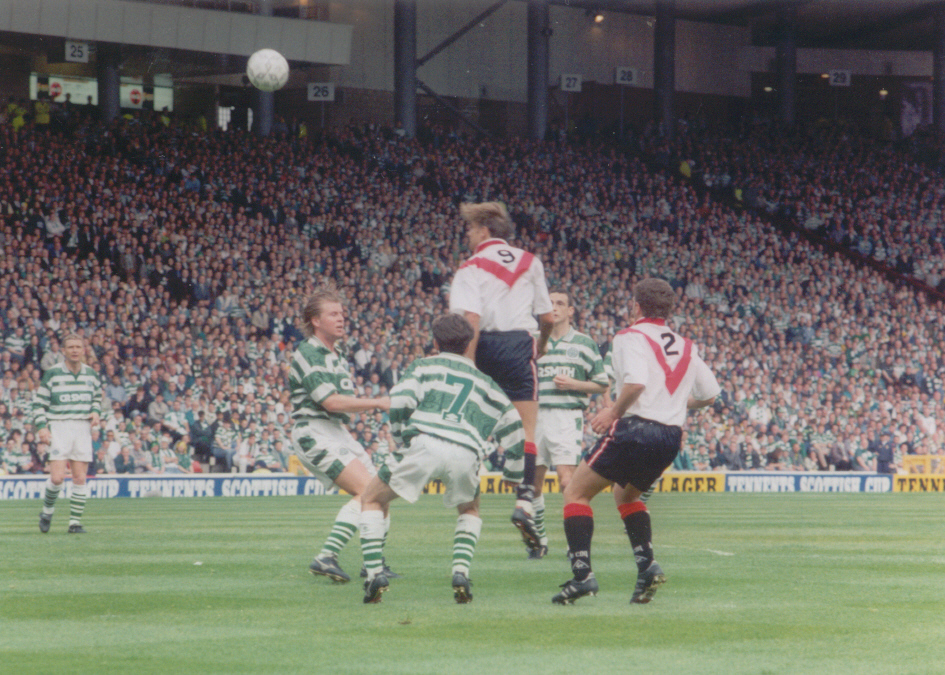
Second-tier club Airdrieonians played in the 1995 final against top-tier Celtic.

Some clubs have become renowned for eliminating higher ranked clubs from the tournament despite being underdogs. Division Two club East Fife won the tournament in 1938 by defeating Division One club Kilmarnock, the first team from outside the top-tier of league football to win the trophy. East Fife had previously reached the final in 1927 after eliminating three higher ranked clubs in the preceding rounds. Hibernian became the second tier-two side to win the cup as they defeated Rangers, who were also then in the second tier, in the 2016 final. Only one other club from outside the top-tier of league football has won the competition; non-league Queen's Park defeated Celtic in the 1893 final. (Note: The Scottish Football League was founded in 1890, seventeen years after the Scottish Cup, so all competitors between 1873 and 1890 were technically non-league.) Several other clubs have reached the final whilst competing outside the top tier of league football, but were defeated. (Note: Dumbarton (1897), Kilmarnock (1898), Airdrieonians (1995), Falkirk (1997 and 2015), Gretna (2006), Queen of the South (2008), Ross County (2010), Heart of Midlothian (2020), Inverness Caledonian Thistle (2023) and Dunfermline Athletic (2026) were the clubs who were losing finalists while playing in a lower division.)

In the rounds before the final, some notable shocks have occurred. In 1959, Dundee were eliminated by Highland League club Fraserburgh despite having Scotland internationals in their squad. A season later, Eyemouth United reached the quarter-finals after defeating two higher league clubs. In 1967, Berwick Rangers eliminated defending champions Rangers in the first round.

Celtic's shock defeat by First Division club Inverness Caledonian Thistle in 2000 led to the famous newspaper headline "Super Caley go ballistic, Celtic are atrocious". In the 2020–21 competition, Highland League club Brora Rangers knocked out Championship leaders Heart of Midlothian, who had been runners-up in each of the two previous seasons. Cup holders St Johnstone were knocked out by League Two (fourth tier) club Kelty Hearts in 2021–22.

Drumchapel United of the West of Scotland First Division, a seventh tier league in the Scottish pyramid, defeated League One side (third tier) Edinburgh in the 2022–23 edition. This was the biggest statistical cup shock in the history of the competition, with 62 places separating the teams in the leagues at the time. Later in that season, West of Scotland Premier Division (sixth tier) side Darvel knocked out Premiership club Aberdeen, with 56 places separating the two teams.

In 2025, Rangers were eliminated in the Fifth round by mid-table second tier Queen's Park after a 1–0 defeat at Ibrox Stadium. It was the first time in Rangers' history that they lost a home tie to a lower division team in the competition, as well as the first time since 1967 that they had been eliminated by a lower division rival. Queen's Park had not defeated their historic Glasgow rivals in any competition since 1948, and had not won a Scottish Cup meeting since 1882.

Other results regarded as shocks include Stenhousemuir's win against Aberdeen in 1995, and Albion Rovers' defeat of Motherwell in 2013.

== Sponsorship ==
The Scottish Cup has been sponsored several times since the first organisation backed the tournament in 1983. The sponsor has been able to determine the name of the competition. There have been five sponsors since 1983 as well as several name changes within the duration of each sponsorship. The competition relies on revenue earned from these agreements although it ran without a title sponsor for over 100 years until the late 1980s.

Period	Sponsor	Name
1873–1982	No sponsor	Scottish Cup
1983–88	Scottish Health Education Group	Scottish Cup
1988–89	No sponsor	Scottish Cup
1989–2007	Tennent Caledonian Breweries	Tennent's Scottish Cup
2007–08	No sponsor	Scottish Cup
2008–10	Scottish Government	Homecoming Scottish Cup in 2008–09 and the Active Nation Scottish Cup in 2009–10
2010–11	No sponsor	Scottish Cup
2011–20	William Hill	William Hill Scottish Cup
2020–23	No sponsor	Scottish Cup
2023–present	Scottish Gas	Scottish Gas Men's Scottish Cup

The Scottish Health Education Group was the first organisation to sponsor the Scottish Cup in 1983 with the largest sponsorship package in Scottish football at the time, worth around £200,000. The partnership was praised for the promotion of a healthy lifestyle linked with football. The deal ended in 1989 when Tennent Caledonian Breweries won the sponsorship rights. Tennent's association with the tournament raised the debate about alcohol sponsorship within sports following the riots at the 1980 Scottish Cup Final which resulted in the sale of alcohol being banned at Scottish sporting events. Despite this controversy, the partnership was largely successful and lasted 18 years until 2007. The SFA received around £25 million over the duration of the sponsorship deal. The Scottish Government in association with businessman Willie Haughey sponsored the Scottish Cup between 2008 and 2010. The 2008–09 competition was known as the Homecoming Scottish Cup to promote Scotland's year of homecoming and tourism. The 2009–10 competition was known the Active Nation Scottish Cup to promote a healthy living through football. Carling was an additional sponsor between 2010 and 2014 as the competition's official beer.

== Media coverage ==
=== UK and Ireland ===
Scottish Cup matches are currently broadcast live by both BBC Scotland in Scotland and Premier Sports across the rest of the United Kingdom and Ireland.

BBC Radio Scotland provide radio coverage including several full live commentaries with additional commentaries broadcast on Radio Scotland's local frequencies. Radio broadcasting rights are also held by BBC Radio nan Gàidheal and BBC Radio 5 Live also carry some games.

The Scottish Cup Final is one of several events reserved for live broadcast in Scotland terrestrial television under the Ofcom Code on Sports and Other Listed and Designated Events.

=== International ===
The Scottish FA sells overseas rights separately from their domestic contract.

Territory	Network
Albania	SuperSport
Kosovo	SuperSport
Armenia	Setanta Sports
Azerbaijan	Setanta Sports
Georgia	Setanta Sports
Kazakhstan	Setanta Sports
Kyrgyzstan	Setanta Sports
Moldova	Setanta Sports
Tajikistan	Setanta Sports
Turkmenistan	Setanta Sports
Ukraine	Setanta Sports
Uzbekistan	Setanta Sports
Australia	Paramount+
Bosnia and Herzegovina	Arena Sport
Montenegro	Arena Sport
North Macedonia	Arena Sport
Serbia	Arena Sport
Brazil	Canal Gol Brasil
Brunei	Astro
Malaysia	Astro
Bulgaria	Max Sport
Cambodia	Monomax
Laos	Monomax
Thailand	Monomax
Croatia	Sport Klub
Slovenia	Sport Klub
Estonia	Go3 Sport
Latvia	Go3 Sport
Lithuania	Go3 Sport
Indian sub-continent	Fancode
Israel	Sport5
Italy	Como TV
MENA	Sharjah Sports
Poland	Polsat Sport
Portugal	Sport TV
Slovakia	Arena Sport
Turkey	Sıfır TV
Turkey	S Sport+
United States	ESPN

== See also ==
- List of Scottish Cup winning managers
- Football records in Scotland
- Scottish Women's Cup
