= 1983 Scottish Cup final =

1983 Scottish Cup Final
- Event: 1982–83 Scottish Cup
Aberdeen	Rangers
1	0
- (a.e.t.)
- Date: 21 May 1983
- Venue: Hampden Park, Glasgow
- Referee: David Syme
- Attendance: 62,970

The 1983 Scottish Cup Final was played on 21 May 1983 at Hampden Park in Glasgow and was the final of the 108th Scottish Cup. Aberdeen and Rangers contested the match, Aberdeen won the match 1–0, thanks to Eric Black's extra time goal. Aberdeen had already won the Cup Winners' Cup ten days earlier, making the Scottish Cup their second trophy of the season.

== Match details ==
21 May 1983

Aberdeen	1 – 0 (a.e.t.)	Rangers
Black 116'	Report (page 17)

Hampden Park, Glasgow
Attendance: 62,970
Referee: David Syme

Aberdeen	Rangers

ABERDEEN:
GK	(Scotland) Jim Leighton
DF	(Scotland) Doug Rougvie	(substituted off) ?'
DF	(Scotland) Alex McLeish
DF	(Scotland) Willie Miller (c)
DF	(Scotland) John McMaster
MF	(Scotland) Gordon Strachan
MF	(Scotland) Neale Cooper
MF	(Scotland) Neil Simpson
MF	(Scotland) Peter Weir	(substituted off) ?'
FW	(Scotland) Eric Black
FW	(Scotland) Mark McGhee
Substitutes:
MF	(Scotland) Andy Watson	(substituted on) ?'
FW	(Scotland) John Hewitt	(substituted on) ?'
Manager:
(Scotland) Alex Ferguson

RANGERS:
GK	(Scotland) Peter McCloy
DF	(Scotland) Ally Dawson
DF	(Scotland) Dave McPherson
DF	(Scotland) Craig Paterson
DF	(Northern Ireland) John McClelland (c)
MF	(Scotland) Bobby Russell
MF	(Scotland) Dave MacKinnon
MF	(Scotland) Jim Bett
MF	(Scotland) Davie Cooper	(substituted off) 1'
FW	(Scotland) Sandy Clark
FW	(Scotland) John MacDonald	(substituted off) 2'
Substitutes:
MF	(Scotland) Billy Davies	(substituted on) 1'
FW	(Scotland) Gordon Dalziel	(substituted on) 2'
Manager:
(Scotland) John Greig

== Road to the final ==
Aberdeen				Round	Rangers			
Home team	Score	Away team	Aberdeen scorer(s)	Round	Home team	Score	Away team	Rangers scorer(s)
Aberdeen	1 – 0	Celtic	Peter Weir 65'	Semi-finals	Rangers	1 – 1	St Mirren	unknown
Aberdeen	1 – 0	Celtic	Peter Weir 65'	Replay	Rangers	1 – 0 (a.e.t.)	St Mirren	unknown

== Media Coverage ==
In Scotland the Scottish Cup Final was shown live on BBC One Scotland on their Sportscene programme and also on STV and Grampian Television on Scotsport. Live radio commentary was on BBC Radio Scotland

== See also ==
- Aberdeen F.C.–Rangers F.C. rivalry
