= 2020 Scottish Cup final =

Football match

- Event: 2019–20 Scottish Cup
Celtic	Heart of Midlothian
3	3
- Celtic won 4–3 on penalties
- Date: 20 December 2020
- Venue: Hampden Park, Glasgow
- Referee: John Beaton
- Attendance: 0

The 2020 Scottish Cup final was the 135th final of the Scottish Cup and concluded the covid-delayed 2019–20 Scottish Cup. Played on 20 December 2020, the final was won by holders Celtic in a penalty shootout to beat Heart of Midlothian after the match ended 3–3 after extra time. The Victory gave Celtic an unprecedented fourth successive domestic treble. The same teams had contested the 2019 Scottish Cup Final.

== Seven-month delay ==
The match was originally scheduled to take place at Hampden Park on 9 May 2020, but was postponed before the semi-finals being played with no alternative date proposed at that point, as a result of the COVID-19 pandemic in Scotland. On 21 July, the final was rescheduled for 20 December.

=== European place ===
On 1 May 2020, UEFA confirmed that the final would have to be played before the end of the 2019–20 season in early July in order to activate the usual place in the 2020–21 UEFA Europa League for the winners, with the qualification spot instead going to the team finishing fourth in the 2019–20 Scottish Premiership (either with fixtures completed or placings declared). That would adversely impact Heart of Midlothian or Hibernian who were due to meet in one semi-final and had no other route to European football, whereas in the other semi-final Celtic were certain to qualify for Europe from their position at the top of the league table, and fourth-placed Aberdeen had possibilities to do so either if the league continued and they climbed to third, or if Celtic won the Cup and its entry passed to the league. On 22 May, the Scottish Football Association indicated their preference to complete the competition but to wait until such a time as spectators would be allowed to attend, primarily for financial reasons with three large attendances expected at the remaining matches. The Premiership standings at the time of postponement were declared final and three Europa League places, including one for Aberdeen, were duly allocated from the league.

=== Hosting ===
On 9 December 2020, an offer by Inverness Caledonian Thistle Chairman, Scot Gardiner, to host the final at the Caledonian Stadium in then, Tier 1 Restriction, Inverness, in order to allow 150 fans from the Highlands and Moray of either club to attend, was rejected by the SFA on the basis the Scottish Cup has a commitment to be held at Hampden, and that Celtic and Hearts, as well as broadcasters BBC and Premier Sports wouldn't be accepting of the change in venue. Had the offer been accepted, it would've been the first time since 2014 that a final had been held outside Hampden, and the first time since 1896 that the tournament's final would've been held outside Glasgow.

== Match ==
=== Summary ===
Before the game, Hearts announced they would honour their former Cup-winning captain Marius Žaliūkas after his untimely death by having every player wear his number 26 on their shorts. The match was played behind closed doors due to the COVID-19 pandemic. After a bright start by Hearts, Celtic began to create more opportunities, and in the 19th minute Ryan Christie scored with a curling left-footed shot from outside the penalty area, very similar to the goal he scored against Aberdeen in the semi-final, and occurring at nearly the same time. As in that match, Celtic scored a second goal fairly quickly, via a penalty converted by Odsonne Édouard in a Panenka style, after an accidental but clear handball by Hearts captain Christophe Berra.

Facing a tough task to get back into the contest, the Edinburgh side pulled a goal back early in the second half through Liam Boyce, and pulled level on 67 minutes from another header, this time by Stephen Kingsley; the ball crossed the line in mid-air by a matter of centimetres before being cleared by Christie, and the point was awarded by the referee via his wrist-worn goal detection device.

In the final moments of the first period of extra time, Celtic captain Scott Brown's header was parried at close range by Craig Gordon and Leigh Griffiths turned the ball home to give the Glasgow side the lead again. With nine minutes remaining in the second period, Kingsley sent the ball across the Celtic goalmouth and Josh Ginnelly, who had chances to score earlier, found the net to square the contest at 3–3.

In the penalty shootout, Christie was the first player to fail, veteran goalkeeper Gordon diving to his right to save, but inexperienced counterpart Conor Hazard then stopped attempts from Kingsley and Craig Wighton. Kristoffer Ajer converted the last kick for a 4–3 outcome from the spot, sealing a historic fourth consecutive Scottish Cup and a twelfth domestic trophy in succession for Celtic.

All six goals and the shootout took place at the same (west) end of the stadium. The six goals scored tied the highest total since seven were scored in 1991; the two others both involved Hearts: a 5–1 loss to Rangers in 1996 and a victory over Hibernian by the same scoreline in 2012. No losing team had scored three times since Dundee United in 1991. Celtic manager Neil Lennon became the first person to win the domestic treble in Scotland as both a player and coach, having first achieved the feat with the same club in 2000–01. Celtic became the first team to use six substitutions (five under temporary COVID-19 regulations and one additional change in extra time which was widely adopted two years earlier) in a major competition in Scottish football.

=== Details ===
20 December 2020
14:15

Celtic	3–3 (a.e.t.)	Heart of Midlothian
Christie 19'; Édouard 29' (pen.); Griffiths 105'	Report	Boyce 48'; Kingsley 67'; Ginnelly 111'
Penalties
Griffiths (penalty scored); McGregor (penalty scored); Christie (penalty missed); Johnston (penalty scored); Ajer (penalty scored)	4–3	(penalty scored) Naismith; (penalty scored) Smith; (penalty scored) Lee; (penalty missed) Kingsley; (penalty missed) Wighton

Hampden Park, Glasgow
Attendance: 0
Referee: John Beaton

Celtic	Heart of Midlothian

GK	65	(Northern Ireland) Conor Hazard
RB	35	(Norway) Kristoffer Ajer	(yellow card) 91'
CB	2	(France) Christopher Jullien	(yellow card) 116'
CB	4	(Republic of Ireland) Shane Duffy		(substituted off) 90'
LB	3	(Scotland) Greg Taylor		(substituted off) 83'
CM	8	(Scotland) Scott Brown		(substituted off) 105'
CM	42	(Scotland) Callum McGregor	(yellow card) 107'
RW	17	(Scotland) Ryan Christie	(yellow card) 65'
AM	14	(Scotland) David Turnbull		(substituted off) 68'
LW	27	(Norway) Mohamed Elyounoussi	(yellow card) 71'	(substituted off) 83'
CF	22	(France) Odsonne Édouard		(substituted off) 97'
Substitutes:
GK	1	(Greece) Vasilis Barkas
MF	6	(Israel) Nir Bitton
FW	9	(Scotland) Leigh Griffiths		(substituted on) 97'
FW	11	(Poland) Patryk Klimala
MF	12	(Ivory Coast) Ismaila Soro		(substituted on) 105'
MF	18	(Australia) Tom Rogic		(substituted on) 68'
MF	19	(Scotland) Mikey Johnston		(substituted on) 90'
DF	30	(Netherlands) Jeremie Frimpong		(substituted on) 83'
DF	93	(Uruguay) Diego Laxalt		(substituted on) 83'
Manager:
(Northern Ireland) Neil Lennon

GK	1	(Scotland) Craig Gordon	(yellow card) 29'
RB	2	(Northern Ireland) Michael Smith
CB	26	(Scotland) Craig Halkett
CB	6	(Scotland) Christophe Berra
LB	21	(Scotland) Stephen Kingsley
CM	19	(Scotland) Andy Irving		(substituted off) 109'
CM	16	(Scotland) Andy Halliday	(yellow card) 33'	(substituted off) 90'
RW	7	(Scotland) Jamie Walker	(yellow card) 51'	(substituted off) 57'
AM	14	(Scotland) Steven Naismith	(yellow card) 62'
LW	3	(Republic of Ireland) Aidy White		(substituted off) 82'
CF	10	(Northern Ireland) Liam Boyce		(substituted off) 70'
Substitutes:
GK	13	(Scotland) Ross Stewart
MF	5	(Austria) Peter Haring		(substituted on) 90'
MF	8	(England) Olly Lee		(substituted on) 82'
MF	11	(England) Jordan Roberts
FW	15	(Scotland) Craig Wighton	(yellow card) 88'	(substituted on) 70'
MF	24	(England) Elliott Frear		(substituted on) 109'
DF	28	(Romania) Mihai Popescu
MF	30	(England) Josh Ginnelly		(substituted on) 57'
FW	31	(Scotland) Euan Henderson
Manager:
(Scotland) Robbie Neilson

Match rules

- 90 minutes
- 30 minutes of extra time if necessary
- Penalty shoot-out if scores still level
- Nine named substitutes
- Maximum of five substitutions in normal time (a sixth substitute is permitted in extra time)

== Media coverage ==
BBC Scotland and Premier Sports had the rights to broadcast the final, in what was the second season of a six-year deal in the United Kingdom to broadcast Scottish Cup matches from the fourth round onward.

== See also ==
Finals played between same clubs:

- 1901 Scottish Cup Final
- 1907 Scottish Cup Final
- 1956 Scottish Cup Final
- 2019 Scottish Cup Final
