= 2020–21 Rangers F.C. season =

Rangers
2020–21 season
- Chairman: Douglas Park
- Manager: Steven Gerrard
- Ground: Ibrox Stadium
- Scottish Premiership: 1st
- Scottish Cup: Quarter-finals
- League Cup: Quarter-finals
- Europa League: Round of 16
- Top goalscorer: League: Kemar Roofe (14); All: James Tavernier (19)
Home colours	Away colours	Third colours

The 2020–21 season was the 141st season of competitive football by Rangers.

Rangers played a total of 56 competitive matches during the 2020−21 season.

On 7 March 2021, Rangers clinched the Premiership title, their 55th Scottish championship, after rivals Celtic drew 0–0 away to Dundee United. It was Rangers' first league title in a decade and the first time Celtic had not finished as league champions in that same span.

With a 4–0 win over Aberdeen on the final day of the season, Rangers sealed an undefeated league season and became the first club since Celtic in 2016–17 to reach the 100 point milestone. Rangers won all 19 home games at Ibrox and equalled the league record of 26 clean sheets in the campaign. They also set a new British record by conceding only 13 goals in their 32 wins and six draws.

== Players ==
=== Squad information ===
N	Pos.	Nat.	Name	Age	Since	App	Goals	Ends	Transfer fee	Notes
1	GK	(Scotland)	Allan McGregor	44	2018	421	0	2022	Free	
2	DF	(England)	James Tavernier (captain)	35	2015	289	65	2024	£0.2m	
3	DF	(Nigeria)	Calvin Bassey	26	2020	15	1	2024	£0.23m	
4	DF	(England)	Jack Simpson	29	2021 (Winter)	7	0	2025	Undisclosed	
5	DF	(Sweden)	Filip Helander	33	2019	49	5	2023	£3.5m	
6	DF	(England)	Connor Goldson (vc)	33	2018	162	16	2022	£3m	
7	MF	(Romania)	Ianis Hagi	28	2020	59	11	2023	£3m	
8	MF	(Scotland)	Ryan Jack	34	2017	130	11	2023	Free	
9	FW	(England)	Jermain Defoe	44	2020	72	32	2021	Free	
10	MF	(Northern Ireland)	Steven Davis	41	2019	321	25	2022	Free	
11	FW	(Switzerland)	Cedric Itten	29	2020	37	6	2024	Undisclosed	
13	GK	(England)	Andy Firth	30	2019 (Winter)	1	0	2022	Undisclosed	
14	MF	(England)	Ryan Kent	30	2019	128	27	2023	£6.5m	
15	MF	(South Africa)	Bongani Zungu	34	2020	21	0	2021	Loan	
16	DF	(Scotland)	Nathan Patterson	25	2019	16	2	2024	Youth system	
17	MF	(Nigeria)	Joe Aribo	30	2019	92	17	2023	£0.3m	
18	MF	(Finland)	Glen Kamara	31	2019 (Winter)	106	4	2023	£0.05m	
19	DF	(Bosnia and Herzegovina)	Nikola Katić	30	2018	59	6	2023	£2m	
20	FW	(Colombia)	Alfredo Morelos	30	2017	182	94	2023	£1m	
23	FW	(Scotland)	Scott Wright	29	2021 (Winter)	13	1	2025	£0.15m	
24	FW	(Scotland)	Greg Stewart	36	2019	33	3	2021	Free	
25	FW	(Jamaica)	Kemar Roofe	33	2020	36	18	2024	Undisclosed	
26	DF	(Nigeria)	Leon Balogun	38	2020	28	0	2022	Free	
31	DF	(Croatia)	Borna Barišić	34	2018	112	7	2024	£1.5m	
33	GK	(Scotland)	Jon McLaughlin	39	2020	14	0	2022	Free	
37	MF	(Canada)	Scott Arfield	38	2018	140	28	2022	Free	
61	DF	(Scotland)	Leon King	22	2020	2	0	2022	Youth system	

- Last updated: 15 May 2021
- Source: Players transfer and Wikipedia players' articles
- Ordered by position on pitch.

=== Transfers ===
==== In ====
===== First team =====
No.	Pos.	Nat.	Name	Age	Moving from	Type	Transfer window	Ends	Transfer fee	Source
7	MF	(Romania)	Ianis Hagi	21	Genk (Belgium)	Transfer	Summer	2023	Undisclosed	
3	DF	(Nigeria)	Calvin Bassey	20	Leicester City (England)	Transfer	Summer	2024	Undisclosed	
33	GK	(Scotland)	Jon McLaughlin	32	Sunderland (England)	Transfer	Summer	2022	Free	
9	FW	(England)	Jermain Defoe	37	Bournemouth (England)	Transfer	Summer	2021	Free	
26	DF	(Nigeria)	Leon Balogun	32	Wigan Athletic (England)	Transfer	Summer	2021	Free	
25	FW	(Jamaica)	Kemar Roofe	27	Anderlecht (Belgium)	Transfer	Summer	2024	£4.5m	
11	FW	(Switzerland)	Cedric Itten	23	St. Gallen (Switzerland)	Transfer	Summer	2024	£2.7m	
15	MF	(South Africa)	Bongani Zungu	27	Amiens (France)	Transfer	Summer	2021	Loan	
4	DF	(England)	Jack Simpson	24	Bournemouth (England)	Transfer	Winter	2025	Undisclosed	
23	FW	(Scotland)	Scott Wright	23	Aberdeen	Transfer	Winter	2025	£175k	

===== Academy =====
No.	Pos.	Nat.	Name	Age	Moving from	Type	Transfer window	Ends	Transfer fee	Source
	FW	(Northern Ireland)	Charlie Lindsay	16	Glentoran (Northern Ireland)	Transfer	Summer	2023	Free	
	FW	(Scotland)	James Graham	16	Ross County	Transfer	Summer	2023	Undisclosed	
	FW	(England)	Tony Weston	16	Blackpool (England)	Transfer	Summer	2023	Undisclosed	
	GK	(United States)	Aaron Cervantes	18	Orange County SC (United States)	Transfer	Summer	2023	Undisclosed	

==== Out ====
===== First team =====
No.	Pos.	Nat.	Name	Age	Moving to	Type	Transfer window	Transfer fee	Source
	MF	(Scotland)	Jason Holt	28	Livingston	End of contract	Summer	Free	
	GK	(England)	Jak Alnwick	26	St Mirren	End of contract	Summer	Free	
	MF	(England)	Jordan Rossiter	23	Fleetwood Town (England)	End of contract	Summer	Free	
16	MF	(Scotland)	Andy Halliday	28	Heart of Midlothian	End of contract	Summer	Free	
13	GK	(England)	Wes Foderingham	29	Sheffield United (England)	End of contract	Summer	Free	
15	DF	(England)	Jon Flanagan	27	Charleroi (Belgium)	End of contract	Summer	Free	
11	MF	(England)	Sheyi Ojo	22	Liverpool (England)	Loan Return	Summer	n/a	
23	FW	(Switzerland)	Florian Kamberi	25	Hibernian	Loan Return	Summer	n/a	
32	FW	(Scotland)	Jake Hastie	21	Motherwell	Loan	Summer	n/a	
25	DF	(United States)	Matt Polster	27	New England Revolution (United States)	Transfer	Summer	Undisclosed	
28	MF	(Scotland)	Ross McCrorie	22	Aberdeen	Loan (Note: Loan with obligation to sign on permanent contract at end of season.)	Summer	n/a	
27	MF	(Scotland)	Greg Docherty	23	Hull City (England)	Transfer	Summer	Undisclosed	
15	FW	(Scotland)	Jamie Murphy	31	Hibernian	Loan	Summer	n/a	
40	MF	(Scotland)	Glenn Middleton	21	St Johnstone	Loan	Winter	n/a	
22	MF	(Northern Ireland)	Jordan Jones	26	Sunderland (England)	Loan	Winter	n/a	
21	MF	(England)	Brandon Barker	24	Oxford United (England)	Loan	Winter	n/a	
4	DF	(England)	George Edmundson	23	Derby County (England)	Loan	Winter	n/a	
28	MF	(Scotland)	Ross McCrorie	22	Aberdeen	Transfer	Winter	Undisclosed	
36	MF	(Scotland)	Jamie Barjonas	22	Ayr United	Loan	Winter	n/a	

===== Academy =====
No.	Pos.	Nat.	Name	Age	Moving to	Type	Transfer window	Transfer fee	Source
44	DF	(Scotland)	Aidan Wilson	21	Crusaders (Northern Ireland)	End of contract	Summer	Free	
42	GK	(Scotland)	Aidan McAdams	21	Greenock Morton	End of contract	Summer	Free	
55	MF	(Portugal)	Joaõ Baldé	19	Livingston	End of contract	Summer	Free	
61	MF	(Scotland)	Kieran McKechnie	19	Queen of the South	End of contract	Summer	Free	
	MF	(United States)	Julian Anderson	19	Virginia Cavaliers (United States)	End of contract	Summer	Free	
27	MF	(Scotland)	Stephen Kelly	20	Ross County	Loan	Summer	n/a	
28	GK	(Scotland)	Robby McCrorie	22	Livingston	Loan	Summer	n/a	
54	GK	(Scotland)	Kieran Wright	20	Partick Thistle	Loan	Summer	n/a	
	DF	(Scotland)	Rhys Breen	20	Partick Thistle	Loan	Summer	n/a	
	DF	(Scotland)	Matthew Shiels	19	Clyde	Loan	Summer	n/a	
47	MF	(Scotland)	Zac Butterworth	19	Edinburgh City	Loan	Summer	n/a	
51	DF	(Scotland)	James Maxwell	18	Queen of the South	Loan	Summer	n/a	
34	DF	(Scotland)	Lewis Mayo	20	Dunfermline Athletic	Loan	Summer	n/a	
38	FW	(Scotland)	Josh McPake	19	Greenock Morton	Loan	Summer	n/a	
	FW	(Scotland)	Dire Mebude	16	Manchester City (England)	Transfer	Summer	Undisclosed	
30	MF	(Scotland)	Kai Kennedy	18	Inverness Caledonian Thistle	Loan	Summer	n/a	
44	MF	(Northern Ireland)	Cammy Palmer	20	Clyde	Loan	Summer	n/a	
48	GK	(Scotland)	Nicky Hogarth	19	Cowdenbeath	Loan	Winter	n/a	
	DF	(Scotland)	Rhys Breen	21	Queen of the South	Loan	Winter	n/a	
30	MF	(Scotland)	Kai Kennedy	18	Raith Rovers	Loan	Winter	n/a	
46	MF	(Scotland)	Jack Thomson	20	Clyde	Loan	Winter	n/a	
38	FW	(Scotland)	Josh McPake	19	Harrogate Town (England)	Loan	Winter	n/a	
54	MF	(Scotland)	Ben Williamson	19	Arbroath	Loan	Winter	n/a	
39	FW	(Scotland)	Dapo Mebude	19	Queen of the South	Loan	Winter	n/a	
44	MF	(Northern Ireland)	Cammy Palmer	20	Linfield (Northern Ireland)	Transfer	Winter	Undisclosed	
	MF	(Guinea-Bissau)	Umaro Balde	18	Free agent	Transfer	Winter	Free	
55	MF	(Scotland)	Ciaran Dickson	18	Queen of the South	Loan	Winter	n/a	
65	DF	(Scotland)	Adam Devine	17	Partick Thistle	Loan	Winter	n/a	
58	FW	(Northern Ireland)	Chris McKee	18	Brechin City	Loan	Winter	n/a	
56	DF	(Northern Ireland)	Kyle McClelland	19	Falkirk	Loan	Winter	n/a	
60	DF	(Scotland)	Harris O'Connor	18	Brechin City	Loan	Winter	n/a	
49	GK	(Scotland)	Brian Kinnear	19	Annan Athletic	Loan	Winter	n/a	
47	MF	(Scotland)	Zac Butterworth	19	Clyde	Loan	Winter	n/a	
70	MF	(Scotland)	Cole McKinnon	18	East Fife	Loan	Winter	n/a	
	FW	(England)	Kane Ritchie-Hosler	18	Clyde	Loan	Winter	n/a	
68	FW	(Scotland)	Arron Lyall	17	Inverness CT	Loan	Winter	n/a	
65	DF	(Scotland)	Adam Devine	17	Brechin City	Loan	Winter	n/a	
57	MF	(Australia)	Murray Miller	19	Elgin City	Loan	Winter	n/a	
	DF	(Scotland)	Rhys Breen	21	Orange County SC (United States)	Loan	Summer	n/a	
46	MF	(Scotland)	Jack Thomson	21	Orange County SC (United States)	Loan	Summer	n/a	

==== New contracts ====
===== First team =====
N	P	Nat.	Name	Age	Date signed	Contract length	Expiry date	Source
16	DF	(Scotland)	Nathan Patterson	19	25 January	3 years	May 2024	
10	MF	(Northern Ireland)	Steven Davis	36	20 March	1 year	May 2022	
1	GK	(Scotland)	Allan McGregor	39	1 April	1 year	May 2022	
2	DF	(England)	James Tavernier	29	6 April	3 years	May 2024	
26	DF	(Nigeria)	Leon Balogun	32	9 April	1 year	May 2022	
13	GK	(England)	Andy Firth	24	29 April	1 year	May 2022	

===== Academy =====
N	P	Nat.	Name	Age	Date signed	Contract length	Expiry date	Source
46	MF	(Scotland)	Jack Thomson	20	3 June	1 year	May 2021	
49	GK	(Scotland)	Brian Kinnear	19	3 June	1 year	May 2021	
73	MF	(Scotland)	Robbie Fraser	17	3 June	2 years	May 2022	
76	MF	(Scotland)	Alex Lowry	16	3 June	2 years	May 2022	
27	MF	(Scotland)	Stephen Kelly	20	24 June	3 years	May 2023	
	GK	(Scotland)	Robby McCrorie	22	3 July	3 years	May 2023	
65	DF	(Scotland)	Adam Devine	17	29 September	2 years	May 2022	
68	FW	(Scotland)	Arron Lyall	17	29 September	2 years	May 2022	
70	MF	(Scotland)	Cole McKinnon	17	29 September	2 years	May 2022	
58	FW	(Northern Ireland)	Chris McKee	18	26 November	2 years	May 2022	
30	MF	(Scotland)	Kai Kennedy	18	8 January	2 years	May 2023	
54	MF	(Scotland)	Ben Williamson	19	13 January	1 year	May 2022	
55	MF	(Scotland)	Ciaran Dickson	18	22 January	2 years	May 2023	
71	GK	(Scotland)	Jay Hogarth	17	19 March	2 years	May 2023	
	GK	(Scotland)	Kieran Wright	22	3 April	2 years	May 2023	

=== Awards ===
N	P	Nat.	Name	Award	Date	From	Source
	MAN	(England)	Steven Gerrard	Premiership Manager of the Month	August	Scottish Professional Football League	
14	FW	(England)	Ryan Kent	Premiership Player of the Month	August	Scottish Professional Football League	
2	DF	(England)	James Tavernier	Premiership Player of the Month	September	Scottish Professional Football League	
	MAN	(England)	Steven Gerrard	Premiership Manager of the Month	October	Scottish Professional Football League	
6	DF	(England)	Connor Goldson	Premiership Player of the Month	October	Scottish Professional Football League	
	MAN	(England)	Steven Gerrard	Premiership Manager of the Month	November	Scottish Professional Football League	
2	DF	(England)	James Tavernier	Premiership Player of the Month	November	Scottish Professional Football League	
	MAN	(England)	Steven Gerrard	Premiership Manager of the Month	February	Scottish Professional Football League	
20	FW	(Colombia)	Alfredo Morelos	Premiership Player of the Month	March	Scottish Professional Football League	
	MAN	(England)	Steven Gerrard	SFWA Manager of the Year	2020–21	Scottish Football Writers' Association	
	MAN	(England)	Steven Gerrard	SPFL Manager of the Year	2020–21	Scottish Professional Football League	
1	GK	(Scotland)	Allan McGregor	SPFL Player of the Year	2020–21	Scottish Professional Football League	
10	MF	(Northern Ireland)	Steven Davis	SFWA Footballer of the Year	2020–21	Scottish Football Writers' Association	
2	DF	(England)	James Tavernier	PFA Scotland Players' Player of the Year	2020–21	PFA Scotland	
	MAN	(England)	Steven Gerrard	PFA Scotland Manager of the Year	2020–21	PFA Scotland	

== Results and fixtures ==
Win Draw Loss Postponed

=== Pre-season and friendlies ===
10 July 2020 Friendly	Rangers	2–1	Hamilton Academical	Auchenhowie
12:00	Bassey 43'; Morelos 88' (pen.)	Report	Hughes 8'	Stadium: Rangers Training Centre

16 July 2020 2020 Veolia Cup	Lyon	0–2	Rangers	Lyon, France
19:45 GMT	Marcelo (yellow card) 39'; Depay (yellow card) 75'	Report	Marcelo 20' (o.g.); Hagi 25'; Kent (red card) 39'; Docherty (yellow card) 87'	Stadium: Groupama Stadium; Attendance: 5,000; Referee: Karim Abed

18 July 2020 2020 Veolia Cup	Nice	0–2	Rangers	Lyon, France
17:15 GMT	Trouillet (yellow card) 8'; Kamara (yellow card) 82'	Report	Edmundson (yellow card) 38'; Defoe 40'; Barjonas 90+3'	Stadium: Groupama Stadium; Attendance: 5,000; Referee: Jérémie Pignard

22 July 2020 Friendly	Rangers	4–0	Motherwell	Glasgow
20:00	Kent 7'; Hagi 10'; Aribo 45'; Lamie 68' (o.g.)	Report		Stadium: Ibrox Stadium; Attendance: N/A; Referee: Don Robertson

25 July 2020 Friendly	Rangers	2–0	Coventry City	Glasgow
17:15	Aribo 50'; Goldson 67'	Report		Stadium: Ibrox Stadium; Attendance: N/A; Referee: Willie Collum

=== Scottish Premiership ===
1 August 2020 1	Aberdeen	0–1	Rangers	Aberdeen
12:30	Ojo (yellow card) 45'; Considine (red card) 87'	Report	Kent 21'	Stadium: Pittodrie Stadium; Attendance: N/A; Referee: Bobby Madden

9 August 2020 2	Rangers	3–0	St Mirren	Glasgow
15:00	McCarthy 23' (o.g.); Morelos 69', 74'	Report	Sheron (yellow card) 25'; MacPherson (yellow card) 68'	Stadium: Ibrox Stadium; Attendance: N/A; Referee: Andrew Dallas

12 August 2020 3	Rangers	3–0	St Johnstone	Glasgow
19:45	Barišić 21'; Kent 45+2'; Aribo 49'	Report	McCart (yellow card) 37'; Gordon (yellow card) 78'	Stadium: Ibrox Stadium; Attendance: N/A; Referee: Euan Anderson

16 August 2020 4	Livingston	0–0	Rangers	Livingston
16:30		Report	Morelos (yellow card) 65'	Stadium: Almondvale Stadium; Attendance: N/A; Referee: Nick Walsh

22 August 2020 5	Rangers	2–0	Kilmarnock	Glasgow
15:00	Itten (yellow card) 32'; Roofe 50'; Kent 77'	Report	Tshibola (yellow card) 55'	Stadium: Ibrox Stadium; Attendance: N/A; Referee: Kevin Clancy

29 August 2020 6	Hamilton Academical	0–2	Rangers	Hamilton
17:30	Callachan (yellow card) 63'; McMann (yellow card) 11' (yellow-red card) 76'	Report	Hagi 15'; Tavernier 20'; Goldson (yellow card) 26'; Barker (yellow card) 85'	Stadium: New Douglas Park; Attendance: N/A; Referee: Willie Collum

12 September 2020 7	Rangers	4–0	Dundee United	Glasgow
15:00	Kent 13'; Barišić (yellow card) 31'; Tavernier 39'; Roofe 68'; Arfield 87'	Report	Bolton (yellow card) 7'; Edwards (yellow card) 70'; Pawlett (yellow card) 83'	Stadium: Ibrox Stadium; Attendance: N/A; Referee: Kevin Clancy

20 September 2020 8	Hibernian	2–2	Rangers	Edinburgh
12:00	Wright 22'; Porteous (yellow card) 35'; Hanlon (yellow card) 37'; McGinn (yellow card) 60'; Doidge 71'; Boyle (yellow card) 80'	Report	Morelos 45+1', (yellow card) 90+1'; Arfield 57'	Stadium: Easter Road; Attendance: N/A; Referee: Don Robertson

27 September 2020 9	Motherwell	1–5	Rangers	Motherwell
12:00	Lamie (yellow card) 31'; Edmundson 87' (o.g.)	Report	Tavernier 12' (pen.), 37' (pen.); Jones 28'; Itten 75', 80'	Stadium: Fir Park; Attendance: N/A; Referee: Bobby Madden

4 October 2020 10	Rangers	2–0	Ross County	Glasgow
15:00	Tavernier 17' (pen.); Barker 88'	Report	Morris (yellow card) 21'	Stadium: Ibrox Stadium; Attendance: N/A; Referee: Greg Aitken

17 October 2020 11	Celtic	0–2	Rangers	Glasgow
12:30	Brown (yellow card) 61'; Duffy (yellow card) 85'	Report	Goldson 9', 54'; Arfield (yellow card) 60'; Morelos (yellow card) 85'	Stadium: Celtic Park; Attendance: N/A; Referee: John Beaton

25 October 2020 12	Rangers	2–0	Livingston	Glasgow
15:00	Aribo 9'; Defoe 16'; Jack (yellow card) 89'	Report	Guthrie (yellow card) 68'	Stadium: Ibrox Stadium; Attendance: N/A; Referee: Nick Walsh

1 November 2020 13	Kilmarnock	0–1	Rangers	Kilmarnock
12:00	Waters (yellow card) 23'; Tshibola (yellow card) 41'; Power (yellow card) 90'	Report	Tavernier 19' (pen.); Barišić (yellow card) 44'; Goldson (yellow card) 70'; Davis (yellow card) 83'	Stadium: Rugby Park; Attendance: N/A; Referee: Andrew Dallas

8 November 2020 14	Rangers	8–0	Hamilton Academical	Glasgow
15:00	Arfield 16'; Roofe 18', 54'; Aribo 19', 36'; Barker 62'; Tavernier 65' (pen.), 69'	Report	Moyo (yellow card) 22'; Callachan (yellow card) 26'	Stadium: Ibrox Stadium; Attendance: N/A; Referee: Steven McLean

22 November 2020 15	Rangers	4–0	Aberdeen	Glasgow
12:00	Kent 15'; Roofe 29'; Arfield 49'; Tavernier 53' (pen.)	Report	Considine (yellow card) 52'	Stadium: Ibrox Stadium; Attendance: N/A; Referee: Nick Walsh

6 December 2020 16	Ross County	0–4	Rangers	Dingwall
12:00	Vigurs (yellow card) 45'; Gardyne (yellow card) 45+1'; Paton (yellow card) 61'; Iacovitti (yellow card) 79'	Report	Roofe 28'; Tavernier 56'; Morris 72' (o.g.); Defoe 90'	Stadium: Victoria Park; Attendance: 300; Referee: John Beaton

13 December 2020 17	Dundee United	1–2	Rangers	Dundee
12:00	Smith 33'; Fuchs (yellow card) 38'	Report	Morelos (yellow card) 12'; Tavernier 26'; Goldson 44'	Stadium: Tannadice Park; Attendance: N/A; Referee: Steven McLean

19 December 2020 18	Rangers	3–1	Motherwell	Glasgow
15:00	Roofe 73', 90+4'; Itten 82'	Report	Lang 6'; Lamie (yellow card) 77'; Archer (yellow card) 82'	Stadium: Ibrox Stadium; Attendance: N/A; Referee: Don Robertson

23 December 2020 19	St Johnstone	0–3	Rangers	Perth
18:00	Wotherspoon (yellow card) 60'; O'Halloran (yellow card) 81' (yellow-red card) 83'	Report	Roofe 24'; Kamara 31'; Hagi 47'	Stadium: McDiarmid Park; Attendance: N/A; Referee: Nick Walsh

26 December 2020 20	Rangers	1–0	Hibernian	Glasgow
12:30	Hagi 33'	Report	Gogić (yellow card) 41'	Stadium: Ibrox Stadium; Attendance: N/A; Referee: Willie Collum

30 December 2020 21	St Mirren	0–2	Rangers	Paisley
15:00	Obika (yellow card) 53'; Shaughnessy (yellow card) 71'	Report	Roofe 27'; Tavernier (yellow card) 29'; Morelos 33'	Stadium: St Mirren Park; Attendance: N/A; Referee: Alan Muir

2 January 2021 22	Rangers	1–0	Celtic	Glasgow
12:30	Davis (yellow card) 39'; McGregor 70' (o.g.); Morelos (yellow card) 75'; Barišić (yellow card) 79'	Report	Soro (yellow card) 41'; Bitton (red card) 62'; Duffy (yellow card) 75'; McGregor (yellow card) 75'	Stadium: Ibrox Stadium; Attendance: N/A; Referee: Bobby Madden

10 January 2021 23	Aberdeen	1–2	Rangers	Aberdeen
15:00	Hedges (red card) 26'; Main (yellow card) 41'; Kennedy 67'; Ferguson (yellow card) 81'	Report	Tavernier (penalty missed) 28', (yellow card) 40'; Morelos 32', 50'	Stadium: Pittodrie Stadium; Attendance: N/A; Referee: John Beaton

17 January 2021 24	Motherwell	1–1	Rangers	Motherwell
12:00	Cole 20', (yellow card) 65'; Carroll (yellow card) 50'; Lawless (yellow card) 74'	Report	Hagi (yellow card) 47'; Itten 72'	Stadium: Fir Park; Attendance: N/A; Referee: Don Robertson

23 January 2021 25	Rangers	5–0	Ross County	Glasgow
15:00	Kent 6'; Tavernier (penalty missed) 13'; Helander 28'; Aribo 37'; Jack 66'; Zungu (yellow card) 76'; Goldson 81'	Report	Iacovitti (yellow card) 13'; Hjelde (yellow card) 64'	Stadium: Ibrox Stadium; Attendance: N/A; Referee: Euan Anderson

27 January 2021 26	Hibernian	0–1	Rangers	Edinburgh
19:45	Doig (yellow card) 12'; McGregor (yellow card) 62'; Irvine (yellow card) 86'	Report	Morelos 51'	Stadium: Easter Road; Attendance: N/A; Referee: Kevin Clancy

3 February 2021 27	Rangers	1–0	St Johnstone	Glasgow
19:45	Roofe (yellow card) 21'; Hagi 52'	Report	Kane (yellow card) 85'	Stadium: Ibrox Stadium; Attendance: N/A; Referee: David Munro

7 February 2021 28	Hamilton Academical	1–1	Rangers	Hamilton
12:00	Callachan (yellow card) 1', (goal) 90+4'	Report	Helander (yellow card) 76'; Easton 80' (o.g.)	Stadium: New Douglas Park; Attendance: N/A; Referee: Bobby Madden

13 February 2021 29	Rangers	1–0	Kilmarnock	Glasgow
15:00	Jack 37'	Report	McKenzie (yellow card) 56'; Tshibola (yellow card) 75'	Stadium: Ibrox Stadium; Attendance: N/A; Referee: Don Robertson

21 February 2021 30	Rangers	4–1	Dundee United	Glasgow
15:00	Hagi 35'; Kent 38'; Aribo 48'; Morelos 64'; Barišić (penalty missed) 67'	Report	Butcher (yellow card) 7'; Robson (yellow card) 51'; Fuchs (yellow card) 66'; McNulty 86'	Stadium: Ibrox Stadium; Attendance: N/A; Referee: Nick Walsh

3 March 2021 31	Livingston	0–1	Rangers	Livingston
18:00	Guthrie (yellow card) 6'; Sibbald (yellow card) 48'; Devlin (yellow card) 51'; Holt (yellow card) 66'; Serrano (yellow card) 71'; Stryjek (yellow card) 81'	Report	Morelos (yellow card) 37', (goal) 87'; McGregor (yellow card) 90+1'	Stadium: Almondvale Stadium; Attendance: N/A; Referee: John Beaton

6 March 2021 32	Rangers	3–0	St Mirren	Glasgow
15:00	Kent 14'; Morelos 16'; Hagi 46', (yellow card) 71'	Report	McGrath (yellow card) 59'; Shaughnessy (yellow card) 73'	Stadium: Ibrox Stadium; Attendance: N/A; Referee: Steven McLean

21 March 2021 33	Celtic	1–1	Rangers	Glasgow
12:00	Elyounoussi 23'; Édouard (yellow card) 27'; Brown (yellow card) 55'; Laxalt (yellow card) 66'	Report	Morelos 38', (yellow card) 61'	Stadium: Celtic Park; Attendance: N/A; Referee: Willie Collum

11 April 2021 34	Rangers	2–1	Hibernian	Glasgow
15:00	Aribo 20'; Kent 62'; Barišić (yellow card) 64'; Kamara (yellow card) 70'; Helander (yellow card) 85'	Report	Boyle (yellow card) 27'; Nisbet 78'	Stadium: Ibrox Stadium; Attendance: N/A; Referee: Don Robertson

21 April 2021 35	St Johnstone	1–1	Rangers	Perth
19:00	Rooney (yellow card) 18'; McCart (yellow card) 68'; Kane (yellow card) 87'; Craig 90+4' (pen.)	Report	Wright 55', (yellow card) 65'; Kamara (yellow card) 60'; Hagi (yellow card) 62'; Simpson (yellow card) 64'	Stadium: McDiarmid Park; Attendance: N/A; Referee: Euan Anderson

2 May 2021 36	Rangers	4–1	Celtic	Glasgow
12:00	Simpson (yellow card) 17'; Roofe 26', 57'; Morelos 33'; Defoe 90+2'	Report	McGregor (yellow card) 24' (yellow-red card) 26'; Édouard 30'; Elyounoussi (yellow card) 63'	Stadium: Ibrox Stadium; Attendance: N/A; Referee: Nick Walsh

12 May 2021 37	Livingston	0–3	Rangers	Livingston
18:00	Pittman (yellow card) 31'; Stryjek (yellow card) 41'	Report	Simpson (yellow card) 23'; Morelos (yellow card) 30'; Tavernier 42' (pen.); Kent 57'; Hagi 83'	Stadium: Almondvale Stadium; Attendance: N/A; Referee: Don Robertson

15 May 2021 38	Rangers	4–0	Aberdeen	Glasgow
12:30	Lewis 5' (o.g.); Roofe 34', 60'; Davis (yellow card) 85'; Defoe 88'	Report		Stadium: Ibrox Stadium; Attendance: N/A; Referee: Nick Walsh

=== UEFA Europa League ===
Rangers qualified for the second qualifying round after finishing in second place in the 2019–20 Scottish Premiership.

==== Qualification stage ====
17 September 2020 2QR	Lincoln Red Imps (Gibraltar)	0–5	(Scotland) Rangers	Gibraltar
16:00 BST	Chipolina (yellow card) 66'; Goldwin (yellow card) 71'	Report	Tavernier 21'; Goldson 45+4'; Morelos 67', 88'; Hagi (yellow card) 74'; Defoe 84'	Stadium: Victoria Stadium; Attendance: N/A; Referee: Iwan Arwel Griffith (Wales)

24 September 2020 3QR	Willem II (Netherlands)	0–4	(Scotland) Rangers	Tilburg, Netherlands
20:00 BST	Nelom (yellow card) 27'; Pavlidis (yellow card) 81'; Llonch (yellow card) 82'	Report	Barišić (yellow card) 6'; Tavernier 22' (pen.); Kent 25'; Helander 55'; Morelos (yellow card) 66'; Goldson 71'	Stadium: Koning Willem II Stadion; Attendance: N/A; Referee: Maurizio Mariani (Italy)

1 October 2020 PO	Rangers (Scotland)	2–1	(Turkey) Galatasaray	Glasgow, Scotland
19:45 BST	Arfield 52'; Tavernier 59'	Report	Elabdellaoui (yellow card) 29'; Belhanda (yellow card) 65'; Marcão 87'	Stadium: Ibrox Stadium; Attendance: N/A; Referee: Andris Treimanis (Latvia)

==== Group stage ====
Pos	Team	Pld	W	D	L	GF	GA	GD	Pts	Qualification	RAN	BEN	STL	LCH
1	(Scotland) Rangers	6	4	2	0	13	7	+6	14	Advance to knockout phase	—	2–2	3–2	1–0
2	(Portugal) Benfica	6	3	3	0	18	9	+9	12	Advance to knockout phase	3–3	—	3–0	4–0
3	(Belgium) Standard Liège	6	1	1	4	7	14	−7	4		0–2	2–2	—	2–1
4	(Poland) Lech Poznań	6	1	0	5	6	14	−8	3		0–2	2–4	3–1	—

Source: UEFA

22 October 2020 1	Standard Liège (Belgium)	0–2	(Scotland) Rangers	Liège, Belgium
17:55 BST	Dussenne (yellow card) 18'; Bastien (yellow card) 67'; Bokadi (yellow card) 82'	Report	Tavernier 19' (pen.); Hagi (yellow card) 26'; McGregor (yellow card) 45+4'; Bassey (yellow card) 66'; Roofe 90+2', (yellow card) 90+3'	Stadium: Stade Maurice Dufrasne; Attendance: 3,750; Referee: Jakob Kehlet (Denmark)

29 October 2020 2	Rangers (Scotland)	1–0	(Poland) Lech Poznań	Glasgow, Scotland
20:00 GMT	Balogun (yellow card) 46'; Goldson (yellow card) 51'; Morelos 68'	Report	Ishak (yellow card) 16'	Stadium: Ibrox Stadium; Attendance: N/A; Referee: Kristo Tohver (Estonia)

5 November 2020 3	Benfica (Portugal)	3–3	(Scotland) Rangers	Lisbon, Portugal
17:55 GMT	Goldson 1' (o.g.); Otamendi (red card) 19'; Silva 77'; Núñez 90+1'	Report	Gonçalves 24' (o.g.); Kamara 25'; Morelos 51'	Stadium: Estádio da Luz; Attendance: N/A; Referee: Jesús Gil Manzano (Spain)

26 November 2020 4	Rangers (Scotland)	2–2	(Portugal) Benfica	Glasgow, Scotland
20:00 GMT	Arfield 7'; Roofe 69'; Kamara (yellow card) 80'	Report	Gabriel (yellow card) 16'; Chiquinho (yellow card) 42'; Tavernier 78' (o.g.); Pizzi 81'; Vertonghen (yellow card) 83'	Stadium: Ibrox Stadium; Attendance: N/A; Referee: Radu Petrescu (Romania)

3 December 2020 5	Rangers (Scotland)	3–2	(Belgium) Standard Liège	Glasgow, Scotland
20:00 GMT	Goldson 39'; Tavernier 45+1' (pen.), (yellow card) 72'; Arfield 63'; Roofe (yellow card) 85'	Report	Lestienne 6'; Čop 41'; Dussenne (yellow card) 71'; Fai (yellow card) 90+2'	Stadium: Ibrox Stadium; Attendance: N/A; Referee: Bojan Pandžić (Sweden)

10 December 2020 6	Lech Poznań (Poland)	0–2	(Scotland) Rangers	Poznań, Poland
17:55 GMT		Report	Zungu (yellow card) 7'; Itten 31'; Balogun (yellow card) 57'; Hagi 72'	Stadium: Stadion Miejski; Attendance: N/A; Referee: José María Sánchez (Spain)

==== Knockout stage ====
===== Round of 32 =====
18 February 2021 First leg	Antwerp (Belgium)	3–4	(Scotland) Rangers	Antwerp, Belgium
20:00 GMT	Avenatti 45'; Refaelov 45+8' (pen.); De Laet (yellow card) 58'; Seck (yellow card) 63' (yellow-red card) 88'; Hongla 66', (yellow card) 88'	Report	Aribo 38'; Barišić (yellow card) 44', (goal) 59' (pen.), 90' (pen.); Kent (yellow card) 53', (goal) 83'; Arfield (yellow card) 64'	Stadium: Bosuilstadion; Attendance: N/A; Referee: Georgi Kabakov (Bulgaria)

25 February 2021 Second leg	Rangers (Scotland)	5–2 (9–5 agg.)	(Belgium) Antwerp	Glasgow, Scotland
17:55 GMT	Morelos 9'; Balogun (yellow card) 36'; Patterson 46'; Kent 55'; Kamara (yellow card) 70'; Barišić 79' (pen.); Itten 90+2' (pen.)	Report	Refaelov 31'; Lamkel Zé 57'; Le Marchand (yellow card) 60'; Hongla (yellow card) 71'	Stadium: Ibrox Stadium; Attendance: N/A; Referee: Paweł Raczkowski (Poland)

===== Round of 16 =====
11 March 2021 First leg	Slavia Prague (Czech Republic)	1–1	(Scotland) Rangers	Prague, Czech Republic
17:55 GMT	Stanciu 7'; Zima (yellow card) 56'	Report	Barišić (yellow card) 29'; Helander 36'; Davis (yellow card) 54'	Stadium: Sinobo Stadium; Attendance: 300; Referee: Ovidiu Haţegan (Romania)

18 March 2021 Second leg	Rangers (Scotland)	0–2 (1–3 agg.)	(Czech Republic) Slavia Prague	Glasgow, Scotland
20:00 GMT	Balogun (yellow card) 18' (yellow-red card) 73'; Kamara (yellow card) 39'; Roofe (red card) 62'; Aribo (yellow card) 87'; Goldson (yellow card) 89'	Report	Olayinka 14'; Dorley (yellow card) 35'; Deli (yellow card) 56'; Stanciu 74'; Kúdela (yellow card) 89'	Stadium: Ibrox Stadium; Attendance: N/A; Referee: Orel Grinfeld (Israel)

=== Scottish League Cup ===
29 November 2020 Second round	Falkirk	0–4	Rangers	Falkirk
17:00	Hall (yellow card) 56'; Alston (yellow card) 83'	Report	Defoe 6'; Bassey 30', (yellow card) 59'; Barišić 41'; Tavernier 51'	Stadium: Falkirk Stadium; Attendance: N/A; Referee: Bobby Madden

16 December 2020 Quarter-final	St Mirren	3–2	Rangers	Paisley
20:00	Erhahon (yellow card) 23'; McGrath 40' (pen.), 53', (yellow card) 88'; Doyle-Hayes (yellow card) 55'; Tait (yellow card) 89'; McCarthy 90+2'	Report	Goldson 7'; Itten (yellow card) 61'; Kent (yellow card) 63'; Goldson (yellow card) 88'; Davis 88'; Hagi (yellow card) 89'	Stadium: St Mirren Park; Attendance: N/A; Referee: David Dickinson

=== Scottish Cup ===
4 April 2021 Third round	Rangers	4–0	Cove Rangers	Glasgow
18:30	Defoe 24'; Roofe 31', 32'; Bassey (yellow card) 34'; Davis (yellow card) 36'; Patterson 43'	Report		Stadium: Ibrox Stadium; Attendance: N/A; Referee: Kevin Clancy

18 April 2021 Fourth round	Rangers	2–0	Celtic	Glasgow
15:00	Davis 10'; Kenny 34' (o.g.); Aribo (yellow card) 74'; Barišić (yellow card) 85'; Kent (yellow card) 90+1'	Report	Brown (yellow card) 47'; Édouard (penalty missed) 79'	Stadium: Ibrox Stadium; Attendance: N/A; Referee: Bobby Madden

25 April 2021 Quarter-final	Rangers	1−1 (a.e.t.) (2−4 p)	St Johnstone	Glasgow
18:30	Morelos (yellow card) 36'; Aribo (yellow card) 71'; Tavernier 117'	Report	Kerr (yellow card) 36'; Wotherspoon (yellow card) 45+1'; McCann (yellow card) 55'; Kane (yellow card) 90+2', (goal) 120+2'	Stadium: Ibrox Stadium; Attendance: N/A; Referee: Alan Muir
	Penalties
	Tavernier (penalty missed); Barišić (penalty scored); Defoe (penalty scored); Roofe (penalty missed)		(penalty scored) Craig; (penalty scored) Booth; (penalty scored) Kerr; (penalty scored) McCann

== Club ==
=== Technical Staff ===
Name	Role
Manager	(England) Steven Gerrard
Assistant Manager	(Scotland) Gary McAllister
First Team Coach	(England) Michael Beale
Technical Coach	(England) Tom Culshaw
Goalkeeping Coach	(Scotland) Colin Stewart
Doctor	(England) Dr Mark Waller
Head of Performance	(England) Jordan Milsom
Head of Preparation	(Scotland) Craig Flannigan
Head of Strength and Conditioning	(Greece) Paraskevas Polychronopoulos
Physiotherapist	(England) Steve Walker
Masseur	(Scotland) David Lavery
Kit Executive	(Scotland) Jimmy Bell

=== Kit ===
Supplier: Castore / Sponsors: 32Red (front) and The Energy Check (back)

The kits were produced with manufacturer Castore and was the first year in a five-year deal worth £25 million. Rangers had signed a three-year kit supply agreement with Hummel, operated through Elite Sports Group. However, Sports Direct, owned by Mike Ashley, took legal action against the club, claiming it had not been given the contractual opportunity to match the Hummel offer. The High Court subsequently ruled that Rangers could not wear any Hummel-branded kits, preventing the deal.

Home	Away	Third	Retro Shirt

== Squad statistics ==
The table below includes all players registered with the SPFL as part of the Rangers squad for 2020–21 season. They may not have made an appearance.

=== Appearances, goals and discipline ===
No.	Pos.	Nat.	Name	Totals		Scottish Premiership		Scottish Cup		League Cup		Europa League		Discipline	
No.	Pos.	Nat.	Name	Apps	Goals	Apps	Goals	Apps	Goals	Apps	Goals	Apps	Goals	Yellow card	Red card
Goalkeepers
1	GK	(Scotland) SCO	Allan McGregor	42	0	27	0	2	0	1	0	12	0	2	0
13	GK	(England) ENG	Andy Firth	0	0	0	0	0	0	0	0	0	0	0	0
33	GK	(Scotland) SCO	Jon McLaughlin	14	0	11	0	1	0	1	0	1	0	0	0
Defenders
2	DF	(England) ENG	James Tavernier (captain)	46	19	33	12	1	1	2	1	9+1	5	3	0
3	DF	(Nigeria) NGR	Calvin Bassey	15	1	3+5	0	1	0	1	1	1+4	0	3	0
4	DF	(England) ENG	Jack Simpson	7	0	4+1	0	0+1	0	0	0	0+1	0	3	0
5	DF	(Sweden) SWE	Filip Helander	31	3	21+1	1	3	0	0	0	6	2	2	0
6	DF	(England) ENG	Connor Goldson (vice-captain)	56	8	38	4	3	0	2	1	13	3	5	0
16	DF	(Scotland) SCO	Nathan Patterson	14	2	3+4	0	2	1	0	0	3+2	1	0	0
19	DF	(Croatia) CRO	Nikola Katić	0	0	0	0	0	0	0	0	0	0	0	0
26	DF	(Nigeria) NGR	Leon Balogun	28	0	15+4	0	0	0	1	0	7+1	0	4	1
31	DF	(Croatia) CRO	Borna Barišić	50	5	33	1	2	0	1+1	1	13	3	8	0
61	DF	(Scotland) SCO	Leon King	2	0	0+1	0	0	0	0+1	0	0	0	0	0
Midfielders
7	MF	(Romania) ROU	Ianis Hagi	46	8	23+10	7	1+1	0	1+1	0	8+1	1	6	0
8	MF	(Scotland) SCO	Ryan Jack	24	2	16+3	2	0	0	0	0	2+3	0	1	0
10	MF	(Northern Ireland) NIR	Steven Davis	49	2	29+6	0	3	1	1	1	10	0	5	0
14	MF	(England) ENG	Ryan Kent	52	13	36+1	10	2	0	1	0	10+2	3	3	0
15	MF	(South Africa) RSA	Bongani Zungu	21	0	1+13	0	0	0	2	0	1+4	0	2	0
17	MF	(Nigeria) NGR	Joe Aribo	43	8	27+4	7	2	0	1	0	6+3	1	3	0
18	MF	(Finland) FIN	Glen Kamara	51	2	28+5	1	3	0	0+2	0	13	1	5	0
37	MF	(Canada) CAN	Scott Arfield	45	7	11+17	4	2	0	2	0	10+3	3	2	0
Forwards
9	FW	(England) ENG	Jermain Defoe	20	7	3+12	4	1+1	1	1+1	1	0+1	1	0	0
11	FW	(Switzerland) SUI	Cedric Itten	37	6	5+22	4	0+1	0	2	0	2+5	2	2	0
20	FW	(Colombia) COL	Alfredo Morelos	44	17	26+3	12	2	0	0	0	10+3	5	10	0
23	FW	(Scotland) SCO	Scott Wright	13	1	1+8	1	1+1	0	0	0	0+2	0	1	0
24	FW	(Scotland) SCO	Greg Stewart	8	0	0+5	0	0+1	0	0+1	0	1	0	0	0
25	FW	(Jamaica) JAM	Kemar Roofe	36	18	18+6	14	1+2	2	1	0	5+3	2	3	1
Players transferred or loaned out during the season who made an appearance
4	DF	(England) ENG	George Edmundson	2	0	0+1	0	0	0	0	0	1	0	0	0
21	MF	(England) ENG	Brandon Barker	13	2	4+6	2	0	0	1	0	0+2	0	1	0
22	MF	(Northern Ireland) NIR	Jordan Jones	4	1	2+1	1	0	0	0	0	0+1	0	0	0
40	MF	(Scotland) SCO	Glenn Middleton	1	0	0	0	0	0	0+1	0	0	0	0	0
55	MF	(Scotland) SCO	Ciaran Dickson	1	0	0	0	0	0	0+1	0	0	0	0	0

- Last updated: 15 May 2021

Appearances (starts and substitute appearances) and goals include those in Scottish Premiership, League Cup, Scottish Cup, and the UEFA Europa League.

=== Clean sheets ===
As of match played 15 May 2021

No.	Player	Scottish Premiership	Scottish Cup	League Cup	Europa League	Total	Appearances
1	(Scotland) Allan McGregor	17	1	0	4	22	42
13	(England) Andy Firth	0	0	0	0	0	0
33	(Scotland) Jon McLaughlin	9	1	1	1	12	14
Total		26	2	1	5	34	56

== Competitions ==
=== Overall ===
Competition	Started round	Final position / round	First match	Last match
Scottish Premiership	Matchday 1	1st	1 August 2020	15 May 2021
UEFA Europa League	Second qualifying round	Round of 16	17 September 2020	18 March 2021
Scottish Cup	Third round	Quarter-finals	3 April 2021	25 April 2021
League Cup	Second round	Quarter-finals	29 November 2020	16 December 2020

Source: Competitions

=== Scottish Premiership ===
==== Standings ====
Pos	Team	Pld	W	D	L	GF	GA	GD	Pts	Qualification or relegation (Note: Teams play each other three times (33 matches), before the league is split into two groups (the top six and the bottom six).)
1	Rangers (C)	38	32	6	0	92	13	+79	102	Qualification for the Champions League third qualifying round
2	Celtic	38	22	11	5	78	29	+49	77	Qualification for the Champions League second qualifying round
3	Hibernian	38	18	9	11	48	35	+13	63	Qualification for the Europa Conference League second qualifying round
4	Aberdeen	38	15	11	12	36	38	−2	56	Qualification for the Europa Conference League second qualifying round
5	St Johnstone	38	11	12	15	36	46	−10	45	Qualification for the Europa League third qualifying round (Note: St Johnstone qualified as the 2020–21 Scottish Cup winners.)

Rules for classification: 1) Points; 2) Goal difference; 3) Goals scored; 4) Head-to-head points; 5) Head-to-Head goal difference; 6) Play-off (only if deciding champion, UEFA competitions qualification, second stage group allocation or relegation).
(C) Champions

==== Results by round ====
Round	1	2	3	4	5	6	7	8	9	10	11	12	13	14	15	16	17	18	19	20	21	22	23	24	25	26	27	28	29	30	31	32	33	34	35	36	37	38
Ground	A	H	H	A	H	A	H	A	A	H	A	H	A	H	H	A	A	H	A	H	A	H	A	A	H	A	H	A	H	H	A	H	A	H	A	H	A	H
Result	W	W	W	D	W	W	W	D	W	W	W	W	W	W	W	W	W	W	W	W	W	W	W	D	W	W	W	D	W	W	W	W	D	W	D	W	W	W
Position	3	2	1	1	1	1	1	1	1	1	1	1	1	1	1	1	1	1	1	1	1	1	1	1	1	1	1	1	1	1	1	1	1	1	1	1	1	1

Updated to match(es) played on 15 May 2021. Source:
A = Away; H = Home; W = Win; D = Draw; L = Loss

== See also ==
- List of unbeaten football club seasons
