= 2021–22 Rangers F.C. season =

Rangers
2021–22 season
- Chairman: Douglas Park
- Manager: Steven Gerrard (until 11 November); David McCallum, Jermain Defoe & Brian Gilmour (joint-caretakers; until 22 November); Giovanni van Bronckhorst (from 22 November)
- Ground: Ibrox Stadium
- Scottish Premiership: 2nd
- Scottish Cup: Winners
- League Cup: Semi-finals
- Champions League: Third qualifying round
- Europa League: Runners-up
- Top goalscorer: League: Alfredo Morelos (11); All: James Tavernier; Alfredo Morelos (18)
- Highest home attendance: 50,102 (v Celtic, 29 August 2021)
- Lowest home attendance: 500 (v St Mirren, 26 December 2021)
- Average home league attendance: 45,351
Home colours	Away colours	Third colours

The 2021–22 season was the 142nd season of competitive football by Rangers.

Rangers played a total of 65 competitive matches during the 2021–22 season, reaching the Europa League Final and winning the Scottish Cup.

== Players ==
=== Squad information ===
N	Pos.	Nat.	Name	Age	Since	App	Goals	Ends	Transfer fee	Notes
1	GK	(Scotland)	Allan McGregor	44	2018 (Note: Players second spell at the club; 1st spell 1998–2012)	469	0	2022	Free	
2	DF	(England)	James Tavernier (captain)	35	2015	347	83	2024	£0.2m	
3	DF	(Nigeria)	Calvin Bassey	26	2020	65	1	2024	£0.23m	
4	MF	(England)	John Lundstram	32	2021	48	4	2024	Free	
5	DF	(Sweden)	Filip Helander	33	2019	60	7	2023	£3.5m	
6	DF	(England)	Connor Goldson (vc)	33	2018	223	20	2022	£3m	
7	MF	(Romania)	Ianis Hagi	28	2020	86	15	2024	£3m	
8	MF	(Scotland)	Ryan Jack	34	2017	152	12	2023	Free	
9	FW	(Ivory Coast)	Amad Diallo	24	2022 (Winter)	13	3	2022	Loan	
10	MF	(Northern Ireland)	Steven Davis	41	2019 (Note: Players second spell at the club; 1st spell 2008–2012)	354	26	2022	Free	
11	FW	(Switzerland)	Cedric Itten	29	2020	48	8	2024	Undisclosed	
14	MF	(England)	Ryan Kent	30	2019	174	30	2023	£6.5m	
15	DF	(England)	Jack Simpson	29	2021 (Winter)	14	0	2025	Undisclosed	
16	MF	(Wales)	Aaron Ramsey	35	2022 (Winter)	13	2	2022	Loan	
17	MF	(Nigeria)	Joe Aribo	30	2019	149	26	2023	£0.3m	
18	MF	(Finland)	Glen Kamara	31	2019 (Winter)	158	8	2025	£0.05m	
19	MF	(United States)	James Sands	26	2022 (Winter)	14	0	2023	Loan	
20	FW	(Colombia)	Alfredo Morelos	30	2017	224	112	2023	£1m	
22	DF	(Poland)	Mateusz Żukowski	24	2022	1	0	2025	Undisclosed	
23	FW	(Scotland)	Scott Wright	29	2021 (Winter)	50	8	2025	£0.15m	
24	MF	(Nigeria)	Nnamdi Ofoborh	27	2021	0	0	2025	Free	
25	FW	(Jamaica)	Kemar Roofe	33	2020	72	34	2024	Undisclosed	
26	DF	(Nigeria)	Leon Balogun	38	2020	65	2	2022	Free	
28	GK	(Scotland)	Robby McCrorie	28	2015	2	0	2023	Youth system	
30	FW	(Zambia)	Fashion Sakala	29	2021	50	12	2025	Free	
31	DF	(Croatia)	Borna Barišić	34	2018	155	7	2024	£1.5m	
33	GK	(Scotland)	Jon McLaughlin	39	2020	30	0	2024	Free	
37	MF	(Canada)	Scott Arfield	38	2018	190	34	2023	Free	
42	MF	(Northern Ireland)	Charlie McCann	24	2021	4	0	2024	Youth system	
43	DF	(Scotland)	Leon King	22	2020	8	0	2024	Youth system	
51	MF	(Scotland)	Alex Lowry	23	2021	7	2	2025	Youth system	
52	FW	(England)	Tony Weston	23	2020	1	0	2023	Youth system	
58	MF	(Scotland)	Cole McKinnon	23	2021	1	1	2022	Youth system	
62	FW	(Northern Ireland)	Ross McCausland	23	2021	1	0	2023	Youth system	
64	DF	(Scotland)	Adam Devine	23	2020	2	0	2023	Youth system	

- Last updated: 21 May 2022
- Source: Players transfer and Wikipedia players' articles

=== Transfers ===
==== In ====
===== First team =====
No.	Pos.	Nat.	Name	Age	Moving from	Type	Transfer window	Ends	Transfer fee	Source
24	MF	(Nigeria)	Nnamdi Ofoborh	21	Bournemouth (England)	Transfer	Summer	2025	Free	
30	FW	(Zambia)	Fashion Sakala	24	Oostende (Belgium)	Transfer	Summer	2025	Free	
4	MF	(England)	John Lundstram	27	Sheffield United (England)	Transfer	Summer	2024	Free	
22	MF	(Curaçao)	Juninho Bacuna	24	Huddersfield Town (England)	Transfer	Summer	2023	Undisclosed	
19	MF	(United States)	James Sands	21	New York City FC (United States)	Loan	Winter	2023	N/A	
9	FW	(Ivory Coast)	Amad Diallo	19	Manchester United (England)	Loan	Winter	2022	N/A	
22	DF	(Poland)	Mateusz Żukowski	20	Lechia Gdańsk (Poland)	Transfer	Winter	2025	Undisclosed	
16	MF	(Wales)	Aaron Ramsey	31	Juventus (Italy)	Loan	Winter	2022	N/A	

===== Academy =====
No.	Pos.	Nat.	Name	Age	Moving from	Type	Transfer window	Ends	Transfer fee	Source
42	MF	(Northern Ireland)	Charlie McCann	19	Manchester United (England)	Transfer	Summer	2024	£750,000	
49	FW	(Colombia)	Juan Alegría	19	FC Honka (Finland)	Transfer	Summer	2024	Undisclosed	
	DF	(Romania)	Kevin Ciubotaru	18	Kinetic Foundation (England)	Transfer	Winter	2024	Free	

==== Out ====
===== First team =====
No.	Pos.	Nat.	Name	Age	Moving to	Type	Transfer window	Transfer fee	Source
36	MF	(Scotland)	Jamie Barjonas	21	Kelty Hearts	End of contract	Summer	Free	
24	FW	(Scotland)	Greg Stewart	31	Jamshedpur (India)	End of contract	Summer	Free	
15	MF	(South Africa)	Bongani Zungu	28	Amiens (France)	Loan Return	Summer	n/a	
29	DF	(England)	George Edmundson	23	Ipswich Town (England)	Transfer	Summer	Undisclosed	
22	MF	(Northern Ireland)	Jordan Jones	26	Wigan Athletic (England)	Transfer	Summer	Undisclosed	
40	MF	(Scotland)	Glenn Middleton	21	St Johnstone	Loan	Summer	n/a	
32	FW	(Scotland)	Jake Hastie	22	Partick Thistle	Loan	Summer	n/a	
11	FW	(Switzerland)	Cedric Itten	24	Greuther Fürth (Germany)	Loan	Summer	n/a	
19	DF	(Bosnia and Herzegovina)	Nikola Katić	24	Hajduk Split (Croatia)	Loan	Summer	n/a	
54	GK	(Scotland)	Kieran Wright	22	Alloa Athletic	Emergency Loan	Summer	n/a	
16	DF	(Scotland)	Nathan Patterson	20	Everton (England)	Transfer	Winter	£12m	
9	FW	(England)	Jermain Defoe	39	Sunderland (England)	Released	Winter	Free	
27	MF	(Scotland)	Stephen Kelly	21	Salford City (England)	Loan	Winter	n/a	
54	GK	(Scotland)	Kieran Wright	22	Dumbarton	Loan	Winter	n/a	
22	MF	(Curaçao)	Juninho Bacuna	24	Birmingham City (England)	Transfer	Winter	Undisclosed	
32	FW	(Scotland)	Jake Hastie	22	Linfield (Northern Ireland)	Loan	Winter	n/a	
21	MF	(England)	Brandon Barker	25	Reading (England)	Released	Winter	Free	
13	GK	(England)	Andy Firth	25	Partick Thistle	Loan	Winter	n/a	

===== Academy =====
No.	Pos.	Nat.	Name	Age	Moving to	Type	Transfer window	Transfer fee	Source
	DF	(Northern Ireland)	Daniel Finlayson	20	St Mirren	End of contract	Summer	Undisclosed	
	FW	(England)	Nathan Young-Coombes	18	Brentford (England)	End of contract	Summer	Undisclosed	
	MF	(Scotland)	Zac Butterworth	18	Caledonian Braves	End of contract	Summer	Free	
	MF	(Scotland)	Ciaran Dickson	19	Celtic	Released	Summer	Free	
	FW	(Scotland)	Dapo Mebude	19	Watford (England)	End of contract	Summer	Free	
	DF	(Scotland)	Matthew Shiels	20	Hamilton Academical	End of contract	Summer	Free	
	DF	(Scotland)	Harris O’Connor	19	Charlton Athletic (England)	End of contract	Summer	Free	
	GK	(Scotland)	Brian Kinnear	20	West Ham United (England)	End of contract	Summer	Free	
	GK	(Scotland)	Nicky Hogarth	19	Nottingham Forest (England)	End of contract	Summer	Free	
38	FW	(Scotland)	Josh McPake	19	Morecambe (England)	Loan	Summer	n/a	
	MF	(Scotland)	Ben Williamson	19	Livingston	Loan	Summer	n/a	
41	MF	(Scotland)	Kai Kennedy	19	Dunfermline Athletic	Loan	Summer	n/a	
	DF	(Scotland)	Rhys Breen	21	Dunfermline Athletic	Transfer	Summer	Undisclosed	
46	DF	(Scotland)	James Maxwell	19	Ayr United	Loan	Summer	n/a	
34	DF	(Scotland)	Lewis Mayo	21	Partick Thistle	Loan	Summer	n/a	
	MF	(Scotland)	Jack Thomson	21	Queen's Park	Loan	Summer	n/a	
	MF	(England)	Malcolm Ebiowei	18	Derby County (England)	Released	Summer	Free	
	MF	(Scotland)	Ben Williamson	20	Raith Rovers	Loan	Winter	n/a	
38	FW	(Scotland)	Josh McPake	20	Tranmere Rovers (England)	Loan	Winter	n/a	
	GK	(Scotland)	Scott Cowie	15–16	Falkirk	Emergency Loan	Winter	n/a	
55	FW	(Northern Ireland)	Chris McKee	19	Linfield (Northern Ireland)	Loan	Winter	n/a	
	MF	(Scotland)	Jack Thomson	21	Queen's Park	Transfer	Winter	Free	
41	MF	(Scotland)	Kai Kennedy	19	Hamilton Academical	Loan	Winter	n/a	
45	GK	(United States)	Aaron Cervantes	19	Partick Thistle	Emergency Loan	Winter	n/a	
49	FW	(Colombia)	Juan Alegría	19	Partick Thistle	Loan	Winter	n/a	
71	DF	(Scotland)	Harley Ewen	17	Cumbernauld Colts	Loan	Winter	n/a	
65	GK	(Scotland)	Lewis Budinauckas	19	Raith Rovers	Emergency Loan	Winter	n/a	

==== New contracts ====
===== First team =====
N	P	Nat.	Name	Age	Date signed	Contract length	Expiry date	Source
9	FW	(England)	Jermain Defoe	38	8 June	1 year	May 2022	
18	MF	(Finland)	Glen Kamara	25	22 September	4 years	May 2025	
33	GK	(Scotland)	Jon McLaughlin	34	30 January	2 years	May 2024	
51	MF	(Scotland)	Alex Lowry	18	7 May	3 years	May 2025	
37	MF	(Canada)	Scott Arfield	33	7 May	1 year	May 2023	

===== Academy =====
N	P	Nat.	Name	Age	Date signed	Contract length	Expiry date	Source
	MF	(Scotland)	Connor Allan	17	8 June	2 years	May 2023	
64	DF	(Scotland)	Adam Devine	18	8 June	2 years	May 2023	
60	DF	(Scotland)	Robbie Fraser	18	8 June	1 year	May 2022	
51	MF	(Scotland)	Alex Lowry	17	8 June	2 years	May 2023	
76	FW	(Scotland)	Robbie Ure	17	8 June	2 years	May 2023	
38	FW	(Scotland)	Josh McPake	19	1 July	3 years	May 2024	
	MF	(Scotland)	Ben Williamson	19	12 July	2 years	May 2023	
62	FW	(Northern Ireland)	Ross McCausland	18	27 September	3 years	May 2024	
69	DF	(Scotland)	Jack Harkness	17	8 November	2 years	May 2023	
43	DF	(Scotland)	Leon King	17	5 January	2 years	May 2024	
41	DF	(England)	Johnly Yfeko	18	9 April	2 years	May 2024	
59	MF	(Australia)	Murray Miller	20	7 May	1 year	May 2023	
61	DF	(Northern Ireland)	Lewis MacKinnon	19	9 May	1 year	May 2023	
78	FW	(Scotland)	Tyler Pasnik	17	23 May	2 years	May 2024	
65	GK	(Scotland)	Lewis Budinauckas	19	23 May	1 year	May 2023	
50	MF	(England)	Kane Ritchie-Hosler	19	23 May	1 year	May 2023	

== Pre-season and friendlies ==
5 July 2021 Friendly	Partick Thistle	0–1	Rangers	Glasgow
19:00		Report	Itten 83'	Stadium: Firhill Stadium; Referee: Greg Aitken

10 July 2021 Friendly	Tranmere Rovers	1–0	Rangers	Birkenhead
12:00	Morris 36'	Report		Stadium: Prenton Park; Referee: Rob Jones

17 July 2021 Friendly	Rangers	2–2	Arsenal	Glasgow
14:00	Balogun 14'; Itten 75'	Report	Tavares 23'; Nketiah 83'	Stadium: Ibrox Stadium; Referee: Bobby Madden

21 July 2021 Friendly	Blackpool	Cancelled	Rangers	Blackpool
19:00				Stadium: Bloomfield Road

24 July 2021 Friendly	Rangers	0–0	Brighton & Hove Albion	Glasgow
17:30		Report		Stadium: Ibrox Stadium; Referee: Don Robertson

25 July 2021 Friendly	Rangers	2–1	Real Madrid	Glasgow
18:00	Sakala 55'; Itten 77'	Report	Rodrygo 8'; Nacho (red card) 75'	Stadium: Ibrox Stadium; Referee: Willie Collum

== Competitions ==
Win Draw Loss Postponed

=== Overall ===
Competition	Started round	Final position / round	First match	Last match
Scottish Premiership	Matchday 1	2nd	31 July 2021	14 May 2022
Scottish Cup	Fourth round	Winners	21 January 2022	21 May 2022
Scottish League Cup	Second round	Semi-finals	13 August 2021	21 November 2021
UEFA Champions League	Third qualifying round	Third qualifying round	3 August 2021	10 August 2021
UEFA Europa League	Play-off round	Runners-up	19 August 2021	18 May 2022

Source: Competitions

=== Scottish Premiership ===
==== League table ====
Pos	Team	Pld	W	D	L	GF	GA	GD	Pts	Qualification or relegation (Note: Teams play each other three times (33 matches), before the league is split into two groups (the top six and the bottom six).)
1	Celtic (C)	38	29	6	3	92	22	+70	93	Qualification for the Champions League group stage
2	Rangers	38	27	8	3	80	31	+49	89	Qualification for the Champions League third qualifying round
3	Heart of Midlothian	38	17	10	11	54	44	+10	61	Qualification for the Europa League play-off round
4	Dundee United	38	12	12	14	37	44	−7	48	Qualification for the Europa Conference League third qualifying round
5	Motherwell	38	12	10	16	42	61	−19	46	Qualification for the Europa Conference League second qualifying round

Rules for classification: 1) Points; 2) Goal difference; 3) Goals scored; 4) Head-to-head points; 5) Head-to-Head goal difference; 6) Play-off (only if deciding champion, UEFA competitions qualification, second stage group allocation or relegation).
(C) Champions

==== Results by round ====
Round	1	2	3	4	5	6	7	8	9	10	11	12	13	14	15	16	17	18	19	20	21	22	23	24	25	26	27	28	29	30	31	32	33	34	35	36	37	38
Ground	H	A	A	H	A	H	A	H	H	A	H	A	H	A	A	H	A	H	H	H	A	H	A	A	H	H	A	H	A	H	A	H	A	A	A	H	H	A
Result	W	L	W	W	W	D	W	W	D	W	D	W	W	W	W	W	W	W	W	W	D	W	D	L	W	W	D	D	W	W	W	L	W	W	D	W	W	W
Position	1	5	5	3	1	1	1	1	1	1	1	1	1	1	1	1	1	1	1	1	1	1	1	2	2	2	2	2	2	2	2	2	2	2	2	2	2	2

A = Away; H = Home; W = Win; D = Draw; L = Loss

==== Matches ====
31 July 2021 1	Rangers	3–0	Livingston	Glasgow
13:30	Hagi 8'; Wright 78'; Roofe 90'	Report	Lewis (yellow card) 13'; Forrest (yellow card) 25'; Sibbald (yellow card) 60'; Penrice (yellow card) 87'; Devlin (yellow card) 90+4'	Stadium: Ibrox Stadium; Attendance: 23,000 (Note: Attendance limited due to Covid-19 regulations); Referee: John Beaton

7 August 2021 2	Dundee United	1–0	Rangers	Dundee
12:30	Butcher (yellow card) 24'; Mulgrew (yellow card) 41'; Robson 64'; Pawlett (yellow card) 66'; Fuchs (yellow card) 90+3'	Report	Goldson (yellow card) 38'	Stadium: Tannadice Park; Attendance: 4,600; Referee: Don Robertson

22 August 2021 3	Ross County	2–4	Rangers	Dingwall
15:00	Clarke 40'; Randall (yellow card) 50'; Hungbo (yellow card) 72'; White 77' (pen.)	Report	Aribo 17', (yellow card) 37'; Goldson 19'; Morelos 56'; Bassey (yellow card) 77'; Arfield 84'	Stadium: Victoria Park; Attendance: 6,450; Referee: David Munro

29 August 2021 4	Rangers	1–0	Celtic	Glasgow
12:00	Helander 66'	Report	Turnbull (yellow card) 38'; Édouard (yellow card) 65'	Stadium: Ibrox Stadium; Attendance: 50,102; Referee: Kevin Clancy

11 September 2021 5	St Johnstone	1–2	Rangers	Perth
12:30	Muller (yellow card) 41'; O'Halloran 51'; Craig (yellow card) 59'; Rooney (yellow card) 59'	Report	McLaughlin (yellow card) 10'; Roofe 58' (pen.), (yellow card) 59'; Morelos (yellow card) 59'; Tavernier 79'	Stadium: McDiarmid Park; Attendance: 7,319; Referee: Willie Collum

19 September 2021 6	Rangers	1–1	Motherwell	Glasgow
15:00	Sakala 12'; Tavernier (yellow card) 77'	Report	McGinley (yellow card) 19'; Van Veen (yellow card) 37'; Woolery 66'; O'Hara (yellow card) 89'	Stadium: Ibrox Stadium; Attendance: 48,961; Referee: Steven McLean

25 September 2021 7	Dundee	0–1	Rangers	Dundee
15:00	Marshall (yellow card) 53'; Cummings (penalty missed) 59'	Report	Aribo 16', (yellow card) 90+1'; McLaughlin (yellow card) 59'; Bacuna (yellow card) 90+2'	Stadium: Dens Park; Attendance: 8,574; Referee: Bobby Madden

3 October 2021 8	Rangers	2–1	Hibernian	Glasgow
15:00	Aribo (yellow card) 26'; Roofe 60'; Hagi (yellow card) 73'; Morelos 78'; Barišić (yellow card) 90'	Report	Nisbet 8', (yellow card) 45+1'; Porteous (red card) 30'; Allan (yellow card) 33'; McGinn (yellow card) 37'	Stadium: Ibrox Stadium; Attendance: 49,125; Referee: Nick Walsh

16 October 2021 9	Rangers	1–1	Heart of Midlothian	Glasgow
15:00	Goldson (yellow card) 23'; Aribo (yellow card) 35'; Lundstram 40'; Balogun (yellow card) 47'; Bacuna (yellow card) 86'	Report	Cochrane (yellow card) 16'; Baningime (yellow card) 37'; Devlin (yellow card) 75'; Kingsley (yellow card) 86'; Halkett 90'	Stadium: Ibrox Stadium; Attendance: 49,650; Referee: Don Robertson

24 October 2021 10	St Mirren	1–2	Rangers	Paisley
12:00	Ronan 4'; Fraser (yellow card) 90+5'	Report	Tavernier (yellow card) 19'; Roofe 42' (pen.); Morelos 43', (yellow card) 44'	Stadium: St Mirren Park; Attendance: 6,100; Referee: Steven McLean

27 October 2021 11	Rangers	2–2	Aberdeen	Glasgow
19:45	Morelos 20', (yellow card) 90+3'; Tavernier 81' (pen.)	Report	Ramirez 8'; Brown 16'; Ferguson (yellow card) 21'; Ojo (yellow card) 22'; Bates (yellow card) 81'; Lewis (yellow card) 86'	Stadium: Ibrox Stadium; Attendance: 49,760; Referee: John Beaton

31 October 2021 12	Motherwell	1–6	Rangers	Motherwell
12:00	Mugabi 13', (yellow card) 76'; O'Donnell (yellow card) 9' (yellow-red card) 67'	Report	Tavernier 43'; Sakala 45+1', 63', 86'; Kamara 75'; Roofe 90+1'	Stadium: Fir Park; Attendance: 7,740; Referee: Nick Walsh

7 November 2021 13	Rangers	4–2	Ross County	Glasgow
15:00	Aribo 19'; Kent 30'; Balogun (yellow card) 41'; Bacuna 49'; Iacovitti 60' (o.g.)	Report	Hungbo 6'; Iacovitti (yellow card) 12'; Baldwin (yellow card) 37'; White 87'	Stadium: Ibrox Stadium; Attendance: 49,222; Referee: David Munro

28 November 2021 14	Livingston	1–3	Rangers	Livingston
12:00	Anderson 30'; Forrest (yellow card) 31'; Devlin (yellow card) 45+1'; Oméonga (yellow card) 69'	Report	Arfield 8', (yellow card) 9'; Aribo 16'; Sakala 78'	Stadium: Almondvale Stadium; Attendance: 8,825; Referee: David Munro

1 December 2021 15	Hibernian	0–1	Rangers	Edinburgh
19:45	Doyle-Hayes (yellow card) 29'; McGinn (yellow card) 90+4'	Report	Goldson (yellow card) 24'; Roofe 85' (pen.); Tavernier (yellow card) 90+4'	Stadium: Easter Road; Attendance: 17,209; Referee: John Beaton

4 December 2021 16	Rangers	3–0	Dundee	Glasgow
15:00	Aribo 36'; Sweeney 55' (o.g.); Morelos (yellow card) 58', (goal) 70'	Report	Mullen (yellow card) 28'; Griffiths (yellow card) 57'; Marshall (yellow card) 90+2'	Stadium: Ibrox Stadium; Attendance: 49,628; Referee: Alan Muir

12 December 2021 17	Heart of Midlothian	0–2	Rangers	Edinburgh
15:00	Ginnelly (yellow card) 35' (yellow-red card) 80'; Halkett (yellow card) 37'; Gordon (yellow card) 54'; Devlin (yellow card) 84'; Haring (yellow card) 85'	Report	Morelos 9'; Aribo 13', (yellow card) 70'; Tavernier (yellow card) 69'; McGregor (yellow card) 76'; Barišić (yellow card) 81'; Kent (yellow card) 86'	Stadium: Tynecastle Park; Attendance: 18,593; Referee: Nick Walsh

15 December 2021 18	Rangers	2–0	St Johnstone	Glasgow
15:00	Morelos 43'; Kent 49'; Arfield (yellow card) 58'	Report	Gordon (yellow card) 46'; Craig (yellow card) 72'; McCart (yellow card) 80'	Stadium: Ibrox Stadium; Attendance: 47,561; Referee: Euan Anderson

18 December 2021 19	Rangers	1–0	Dundee United	Glasgow
15:00	Tavernier 71' (pen.); McGregor (yellow card) 90+5'	Report	Meekison (yellow card) 34'; Mochrie (yellow card) 61'; Appéré (yellow card) 82'	Stadium: Ibrox Stadium; Attendance: 49,252; Referee: Alan Muir

26 December 2021 20	Rangers	2–0	St Mirren	Glasgow
15:00	Wright 14'; Goldson (yellow card) 23'; Morelos 26'	Report	Shaughnessy (yellow card) 52'; Erhahon (yellow card) 69'	Stadium: Ibrox Stadium; Attendance: 500; Referee: Steven McLean

18 January 2022 21	Aberdeen	1–1	Rangers	Aberdeen
19:45	Brown (yellow card) 39'; McCrorie (yellow card) 58'; Ferguson 73' (pen.); Hayes (yellow card) 76'; McLennan (yellow card) 81'	Report	Hagi (yellow card) 6', (goal) 20'; Tavernier (yellow card) 40'; Morelos (yellow card) 72'; Kent (yellow card) 76' (yellow-red card) 83'	Stadium: Pittodrie Stadium; Attendance: 16,731; Referee: Kevin Clancy

26 January 2022 22	Rangers	1–0	Livingston	Glasgow
19:45	Goldson (yellow card) 31'; Arfield 75'	Report	Oméonga (yellow card) 21'; Longridge (yellow card) 62'	Stadium: Ibrox Stadium; Attendance: 48,343; Referee: Don Robertson

29 January 2022 23	Ross County	3–3	Rangers	Dingwall
12:30	Vokins (yellow card) 7'; Baldwin (yellow card) 14'; White 25'; Charles-Cook 29'; Samuel (yellow card) 70'; Wright 90+6'	Report	Diallo 5'; Tavernier 49'; Goldson 72'	Stadium: Victoria Park; Attendance: 6,401; Referee: Nick Walsh

2 February 2022 24	Celtic	3–0	Rangers	Glasgow
19:45	Hatate 5', 42'; McGregor (yellow card) 22'; Abada 44'; Doak (yellow card) 90+4'	Report	Bassey (yellow card) 52'; Tavernier (yellow card) 75'; Balogun (yellow card) 76'	Stadium: Celtic Park; Attendance: 59,077; Referee: Bobby Madden

6 February 2022 25	Rangers	5–0	Heart of Midlothian	Glasgow
16:00	Morelos 11', 64'; Bassey (yellow card) 27'; Balogun (yellow card) 53'; Kamara 72'; Arfield 75'; Sakala 84'	Report	Atkinson (yellow card) 59'; Kingsley (yellow card) 87'	Stadium: Ibrox Stadium; Attendance: 49,708; Referee: Willie Collum

9 February 2022 26	Rangers	2–0	Hibernian	Glasgow
19:45	Tavernier 5' (pen.), (yellow card) 78'; Barišić (yellow card) 21'; Goldson (yellow card) 28'; Morelos 57'	Report	Bushiri (yellow card) 50'; Stevenson (yellow card) 60'	Stadium: Ibrox Stadium; Attendance: 49,700; Referee: Nick Walsh

20 February 2022 27	Dundee United	1–1	Rangers	Dundee
12:00	Graham 29', (yellow card) 34'; Edwards (yellow card) 31'; Watt (yellow card) 39'	Report	Morelos (yellow card) 41'; Aribo 76'	Stadium: Tannadice Park; Attendance: 9,993; Referee: Bobby Madden

27 February 2022 28	Rangers	2–2	Motherwell	Glasgow
15:00	Mugabi 22' (o.g.); Sakala 24'; Morelos (yellow card) 56'; Tavernier (yellow card) 75'	Report	Efford (yellow card) 28'; Roberts 52'; O'Donnell (yellow card) 71'; Woolery 76'; Donnelly (yellow card) 80'	Stadium: Ibrox Stadium; Attendance: 49,318; Referee: Don Robertson

2 March 2022 29	St Johnstone	0–1	Rangers	Perth
19:45	Hallberg (yellow card) 63'	Report	Kamara 3'; Bassey (yellow card) 31'	Stadium: McDiarmid Park; Attendance: 6,869; Referee: Willie Collum

5 March 2022 30	Rangers	1–0	Aberdeen	Glasgow
15:00	Tavernier (yellow card) 79'; Roofe 81'	Report	Gallagher (yellow card) 25'; Ferguson (yellow card) 63'; Besuijen (yellow card) 89'	Stadium: Ibrox Stadium; Attendance: 50,010; Referee: John Beaton

20 March 2022 31	Dundee	1–2	Rangers	Dundee
12:00	Elliott 6', (yellow card) 45+3'; McGhee (yellow card) 40'; McMullan (yellow card) 41'; McDaid (yellow card) 83'	Report	Tavernier (penalty missed) 42'; Sands (yellow card) 56'; Ramsey 64'; Goldson 86'	Stadium: Dens Park; Attendance: 7,669; Referee: Bobby Madden

3 April 2022 32	Rangers	1–2	Celtic	Glasgow
12:00	Ramsey 3'; Lundstram (yellow card) 41'	Report	Rogic 7'; Carter-Vickers 43', (yellow card) 65'; Giakoumakis (yellow card) 64'; Bitton (yellow card) 82'; Ralston (yellow card) 88'	Stadium: Ibrox Stadium; Attendance: 50,023; Referee: Willie Collum

10 April 2022 33	St Mirren	0–4	Rangers	Paisley
12:00	Power (yellow card) 29'	Report	Roofe 2', 45+4', 50'; Aribo 76'	Stadium: St Mirren Park; Attendance: 6,583; Referee: John Beaton

23 April 2022 34	Motherwell	1–3	Rangers	Motherwell
12:00	Ojalo (yellow card) 31'; Tierney 35'; Slattery (yellow card) 60'; Mugabi (yellow card) 61'	Report	Kelly 14' (o.g.); Balogun (red card) 28'; Arfield (yellow card) 45'; Wright 47'; Tavernier 62' (pen.)	Stadium: Fir Park; Attendance: 8,036; Referee: Nick Walsh

1 May 2022 35	Celtic	1–1	Rangers	Glasgow
12:00	Jota 21'; Ralston (yellow card) 50'; Bitton (yellow card) 72'; Giakoumakis (yellow card) 77'	Report	Barišić (yellow card) 64'; Sakala 67'; Kent (yellow card) 77'; Diallo (yellow card) 87'; Goldson (yellow card) 90+2'	Stadium: Celtic Park; Attendance: 58,247; Referee: John Beaton

8 May 2022 36	Rangers	2–0	Dundee United	Glasgow
15:00	Sakala (yellow card) 25'; Tavernier 55' (pen.); Diallo 78'	Report	Siegrist (yellow card) 55'; Graham (yellow card) 59'	Stadium: Ibrox Stadium; Attendance: 49,340; Referee: Steven McLean

11 May 2022 37	Rangers	4–1	Ross County	Glasgow
19:45	Wright 13'; Tavernier 29' (pen.); Sakala 82'; Diallo 90'	Report	Baldwin (yellow card) 50'; Vokins (yellow card) 58'; Watson (yellow card) 65'; White 72'	Stadium: Ibrox Stadium; Attendance: 48,474; Referee: Andrew Dallas

14 May 2022 38	Heart of Midlothian	1–3	Rangers	Edinburgh
12:15	Simms (yellow card) 16'; Haring 24'	Report	Itten 33'; Lowry 45+1', (yellow card) 53'; King (yellow card) 69'; McKinnon 81'	Stadium: Tynecastle Park; Attendance: 16,969; Referee: Kevin Clancy

=== Scottish Cup ===
21 January 2022 Fourth round	Rangers	4–0	Stirling Albion	Glasgow
19:45	Lowry 31'; Tavernier 37' (pen.), (penalty missed) 40'; Itten 59'; Sakala 86'	Report	Leitch (yellow card) 69'	Stadium: Ibrox Stadium; Attendance: 37,916; Referee: John Beaton

12 February 2022 Fifth round	Annan Athletic	0–3	Rangers	Annan
17:30	Clark (yellow card) 28'	Report	Helander 7'; Roofe 22'; Sakala 32'; McCann (yellow card) 89'	Stadium: Galabank; Attendance: 2,500; Referee: Alan Muir

13 March 2022 Quarter-final	Dundee	0–3	Rangers	Dundee
16:00	Mullen (yellow card) 24'; Kerr (yellow card) 54'; Sweeney (yellow card) 89'	Report	Goldson 9'; Tavernier 25' (pen.); Bassey (yellow card) 73'; Sakala 87'	Stadium: Dens Park; Attendance: 5,536; Referee: Steven McLean

17 April 2022 Semi-final	Celtic	1–2 (a.e.t.)	Rangers	Glasgow
14:00	McGregor (yellow card) 40'; Taylor 64'; Ralston (yellow card) 120'	Report	Aribo (yellow card) 36'; Jack (yellow card) 45'; Roofe (yellow card) 49'; Goldson (yellow card) 72'; Arfield 78'; Starfelt 114' (o.g.); Bassey (yellow card) 117'	Stadium: Hampden Park; Attendance: 50,072; Referee: Bobby Madden

21 May 2022 Final	Rangers	2–0 (a.e.t.)	Hearts	Glasgow
15:00	Diallo (yellow card) 59'; Jack 94'; Wright 97'	Report	Haring (yellow card) 4'; Halkett (yellow card) 106'	Stadium: Hampden Park; Attendance: 50,319; Referee: Willie Collum

=== Scottish League Cup ===
13 August 2021 Second round	Rangers	5–0	Dunfermline Athletic	Glasgow
19:30	Lundstram 3'; Wright 17'; Hagi 19'; Roofe 33', 65' (pen.)	Report	Dow (yellow card) 66'; Watson (yellow card) 84'; Pybus (yellow card) 88'	Stadium: Ibrox Stadium; Attendance: 41,467; Referee: Willie Collum

22 September 2021 Quarter-final	Rangers	2–0	Livingston	Glasgow
19:45	Roofe 48'; Bassey (yellow card) 58'; Morelos 63'	Report	Penrice (yellow card) 62'; Fitzwater (yellow card) 85'	Stadium: Ibrox Stadium; Attendance: 35,579; Referee: Don Robertson

21 November 2021 Semi-final	Rangers	1–3	Hibernian	Glasgow
16:00	Arfield 40'; Barišić (yellow card) 83'	Report	Hanlon (yellow card) 1'; Newell (yellow card) 3'; Boyle 9', 21', 38' (pen.)	Stadium: Hampden Park; Attendance: 45,014; Referee: Kevin Clancy

=== UEFA Champions League ===
==== Third qualifying round ====
3 August 2021 First leg	Malmö FF (Sweden)	2–1	(Scotland) Rangers	Malmö
18:00 BST	Rieks (yellow card) 18', (goal) 47'; Birmančević 49'; Moisander (yellow card) 52'; Nielsen (yellow card) 67'	Report	Barišić (yellow card) 38'; Itten (yellow card) 43'; Arfield (yellow card) 70'; Davis 90+5'	Stadium: Eleda Stadion; Attendance: 5,820; Referee: Szymon Marciniak (Poland)

10 August 2021 Second leg	Rangers (Scotland)	1–2 (2–4 agg.)	(Sweden) Malmö FF	Glasgow
20:00 BST	Morelos 18', (yellow card) 51'; McGregor (yellow card) 34'	Report	Innocent (yellow card) 41' (yellow-red card) 45+1'; Čolak 53', 57'; Ahmedhodžić (yellow card) 78'	Stadium: Ibrox Stadium; Attendance: 47,021; Referee: Slavko Vinčić (Slovenia)

=== UEFA Europa League ===
==== Play-off round ====
19 August 2021 First leg	Rangers (Scotland)	1–0	(Armenia) Alashkert	Glasgow
20:00 BST	Lundstram (yellow card) 33' (yellow-red card) 43'; Morelos 67'; Davis (yellow card) 84'; Arfield (yellow card) 90+3'	Report	Boljević (yellow card) 16'; Gome (yellow card) 59'; James (yellow card) 73'	Stadium: Ibrox Stadium; Attendance: 42,649; Referee: Anastasios Sidiropoulos (Greece)

26 August 2021 Second leg	Alashkert (Armenia)	0–0 (0–1 agg.)	(Scotland) Rangers	Yerevan
16:00 BST	James (yellow card) 35' (yellow-red card) 40'; Kryuchkov (yellow card) 90+3'	Report	Goldson (yellow card) 27'; Barišić (yellow card) 81'	Stadium: Republican Stadium; Attendance: 6,800; Referee: Tobias Stieler (Germany)

==== Group stage ====
Pos	Team	Pld	W	D	L	GF	GA	GD	Pts	Qualification	LYO	RAN	SPP	BRO
1	(France) Lyon	6	5	1	0	16	5	+11	16	Advance to round of 16	—	1–1	3–0	3–0
2	(Scotland) Rangers	6	2	2	2	6	5	+1	8	Advance to knockout round play-offs	0–2	—	2–0	2–0
3	(Czech Republic) Sparta Prague	6	2	1	3	6	9	−3	7	Transfer to Europa Conference League	3–4	1–0	—	2–0
4	(Denmark) Brøndby	6	0	2	4	2	11	−9	2		1–3	1–1	0–0	—

Source: UEFA
Rules for classification: Group stage tiebreakers

16 September 2021 1	Rangers (Scotland)	0–2	(France) Lyon	Glasgow
20:00 BST	Goldson (yellow card) 14'; Aribo (yellow card) 74'; Morelos (yellow card) 75'	Report	Toko Ekambi 23'; Slimani (yellow card) 30'; Boateng (yellow card) 53'; Tavernier 55' (o.g.)	Stadium: Ibrox Stadium; Attendance: 44,906; Referee: Andreas Ekberg (Sweden)

30 September 2021 2	Sparta Prague (Czech Republic)	1–0	(Scotland) Rangers	Prague
17:45 BST	Hancko 29'; Wiesner (yellow card) 43'; Haraslín (yellow card) 71'	Report	Kamara (yellow card) 42' (yellow-red card) 74'; Sakala (yellow card) 67'	Stadium: Stadion Letná; Attendance: 10,879; Referee: Ali Palabıyık (Turkey)

21 October 2021 3	Rangers (Scotland)	2–0	(Denmark) Brøndby	Glasgow
20:00 BST	Balogun 18'; Lundstram (yellow card) 29'; Roofe 30'	Report	Frendrup (yellow card) 41'	Stadium: Ibrox Stadium; Attendance: 46,842; Referee: Fran Jović (Croatia)

4 November 2021 4	Brøndby (Denmark)	1–1	(Scotland) Rangers	Brøndbyvester
17:45 GMT	Balogun 45' (o.g.); Tshiembe (yellow card) 88'	Report	Morelos (yellow card) 4'; Sakala (yellow card) 33'; Hagi 77'	Stadium: Brøndby Stadium; Attendance: 20,462; Referee: Nikola Dabanović (Montenegro)

25 November 2021 5	Rangers (Scotland)	2–0	(Czech Republic) Sparta Prague	Glasgow
20:00 GMT	Morelos 15', 48'; Hagi (yellow card) 45'; Barišić (yellow card) 57'	Report	Krejčí (yellow card) 45+1'	Stadium: Ibrox Stadium; Attendance: 48,370; Referee: Danny Makkelie (Netherlands)

9 December 2021 6	Lyon (France)	1–1	(Scotland) Rangers	Décines-Charpieu
17:45 GMT	Bassey 48' (o.g.)	Report	Wright 41'; Patterson (yellow card) 74'	Stadium: Parc Olympique Lyonnais; Attendance: 26,842; Referee: Radu Petrescu (Romania)

==== Knockout round-play-offs ====
17 February 2022 First leg	Borussia Dortmund (Germany)	2–4	(Scotland) Rangers	Dortmund
17:45 GMT	Bellingham 51'; Zagadou (yellow card) 73'; Guerreiro 82'	Report	Tavernier 38' (pen.); Morelos 41'; Lundstram 49'; Zagadou 54' (o.g.); McGregor (yellow card) 79'	Stadium: Westfalenstadion; Attendance: 10,000; Referee: Clément Turpin (France)

24 February 2022 Second leg	Rangers (Scotland)	2–2 (6–4 agg.)	(Germany) Borussia Dortmund	Glasgow
20:00 GMT	Tavernier 22' (pen.), 57'; Lundstram (yellow card) 39'	Report	Bellingham 31', (yellow card) 51'; Malen 42'; Schulz (yellow card) 55'; Can (yellow card) 67'	Stadium: Ibrox Stadium; Attendance: 47,709; Referee: Antonio Mateu Lahoz (Spain)

==== Round of 16 ====
10 March 2022 First leg	Rangers (Scotland)	3–0	(Serbia) Red Star Belgrade	Glasgow
20:00 GMT	Tavernier 11' (pen.); Morelos 15'; Jack (yellow card) 23'; Aribo (yellow card) 30'; Balogun 51'	Report	Katai (penalty missed) 24'; Sanogo (yellow card) 25'; Rodić (yellow card) 61'; Eraković (yellow card) 82'; Nabouhane (yellow card) 90+3'	Stadium: Ibrox Stadium; Attendance: 48,589; Referee: Serdar Gözübüyük (Netherlands)

17 March 2022 Second leg	Red Star Belgrade (Serbia)	2–1 (2–4 agg.)	(Scotland) Rangers	Belgrade
17:45 GMT	Ivanić 10'; Dragović (yellow card) 70'; Katai (yellow card) 83'; Nabouhane 90+3' (pen.); Pavkov (yellow card) 90+5'; Borjan (yellow card) 90+7'	Report	Kent 56'; Kamara (yellow card) 90+2'	Stadium: Red Star Stadium; Attendance: 47,024; Referee: István Kovács (Romania)

==== Quarter-finals ====
7 April 2022 First leg	Braga (Portugal)	1–0	(Scotland) Rangers	Braga
20:00 BST	Carmo (yellow card) 22'; Ruiz 40'	Report	Jack (yellow card) 36'	Stadium: Estádio Municipal de Braga; Attendance: 20,331; Referee: Davide Massa (Italy)

14 April 2022 Second leg	Rangers (Scotland)	3–1 (a.e.t.) (3–2 agg.)	(Portugal) Braga	Glasgow
20:00 BST	Tavernier 2', 44' (pen.); Roofe (yellow card) 85', (goal) 101'	Report	Tormena (red card) 42'; Carmo 83'; A. Horta (yellow card) 98'; Medeiros (yellow card) 105' (yellow-red card) 105'	Stadium: Ibrox Stadium; Attendance: 48,894; Referee: François Letexier (France)

==== Semi-finals ====
28 April 2022 First leg	RB Leipzig (Germany)	1–0	(Scotland) Rangers	Leipzig
20:00 BST	Angeliño 85'	Report	Goldson (yellow card) 90+2'; Tavernier (yellow card) 90+3'	Stadium: Red Bull Arena; Attendance: 40,303; Referee: Benoît Bastien (France)

5 May 2022 Second leg	Rangers (Scotland)	3–1 (3–2 agg.)	(Germany) RB Leipzig	Glasgow
20:00 BST	Tavernier 19'; Kamara 24'; Bassey (yellow card) 26'; Goldson (yellow card) 31'; Barišić (yellow card) 44'; Lundstram 81'	Report	Kampl (yellow card) 52'; Nkunku 71'	Stadium: Ibrox Stadium; Attendance: 49,397; Referee: Artur Soares Dias (Portugal)

==== Final ====
18 May 2022 Final	Eintracht Frankfurt (Germany)	1–1 (a.e.t.) (5–4 p)	(Scotland) Rangers	Seville
20:00 BST	Borré 69'	Report	Aribo 57', (yellow card) 62'; Wright (yellow card) 73'	Stadium: Ramón Sánchez Pizjuán; Attendance: 38,842; Referee: Slavko Vinčić (Slovenia)
	Penalties
	Lenz (penalty scored); Hrustic (penalty scored); Kamada (penalty scored); Kostić (penalty scored); Borré (penalty scored)		(penalty scored) Tavernier; (penalty scored) Davis; (penalty scored) Arfield; (penalty missed) Ramsey; (penalty scored) Roofe

== Club ==
=== First Team Staff ===
Name	Role
Manager	(England) Steven Gerrard (until 11 November 2021) (Netherlands) Giovanni van Bronckhorst (from 18 November 2021)
Assistant Manager	(Scotland) Gary McAllister (until 11 November 2021) (Netherlands) Dave Vos (from 18 November 2021)
First Team Coach	(England) Michael Beale (until 11 November 2021) (Netherlands) Roy Makaay (from 18 November 2021)
Technical Coach	(England) Tom Culshaw (until 11 November 2021)
Goalkeeping Coach	(Scotland) Colin Stewart
Doctor	(England) Dr Mark Waller
Head of Performance	(England) Jordan Milsom (until 11 November 2021)
Head of Preparation	(Scotland) Craig Flannigan
Head of Strength and Conditioning	(Greece) Paraskevas Polychronopoulos
Physiotherapist	(England) Steve Walker
Masseur	(Scotland) David Lavery
Kit Executive	(Scotland) Jimmy Bell (until 2 May 2022) (Scotland) Jim McAlister

=== Club Staff ===
Name	Role
Honorary Life President	(Scotland) John Greig
Director of Football	(Scotland) Ross Wilson
Head of Academy	(Scotland) Craig Mulholland
Supporters Liaison Officer	(Scotland) Greg Marshall

=== Board of Directors – Rangers International Football Club Plc ===
Name	Role
Chairman	(Scotland) Douglas Park
Deputy Chairman	(Scotland) John Bennett
Company Secretary	(Scotland) James Blair
Non-Executive Director	(Scotland) John Bennett
Non-Executive Director	(Scotland) Alastair Johnston
Non-Executive Director	(Scotland) Graeme Park
Non-Executive Director	(Scotland) Barry Scott
Non-Executive Director	(Denmark) Julian Wolhardt

=== Board of Directors – The Rangers Football Club Ltd ===
Name	Role
Managing Director	(Scotland) Stewart Robertson
Company Secretary	(Scotland) James Blair
Director of Finance and Administration	(Scotland) Andrew Dickson

== Squad statistics ==
The table below includes all players registered with the SPFL as part of the Rangers squad for 2021–22 season. They may not have made an appearance.

=== Appearances and goals ===
No.	Pos.	Nat.	Name	Totals		Scottish Premiership		Scottish Cup		League Cup		Champions League		Europa League	
No.	Pos.	Nat.	Name	Apps	Goals	Apps	Goals	Apps	Goals	Apps	Goals	Apps	Goals	Apps	Goals
Goalkeepers
1	GK	(Scotland) SCO	Allan McGregor	48	0	29	0	0+1	0	1	0	2	0	15	0
28	GK	(Scotland) SCO	Robby McCrorie	2	0	1	0	0	0	0	0	0	0	1	0
33	GK	(Scotland) SCO	Jon McLaughlin	16	0	8	0	5	0	2	0	0	0	1	0
Defenders
2	DF	(England) ENG	James Tavernier (captain)	58	18	35	9	4	2	1+1	0	2	0	15	7
3	DF	(Nigeria) NGR	Calvin Bassey	50	0	28+1	0	3	0	2+1	0	0	0	13+2	0
5	DF	(Sweden) SWE	Filip Helander	11	2	6	1	2	1	0	0	1	0	2	0
6	DF	(England) ENG	Connor Goldson (vc)	61	4	36	3	4	1	3	0	2	0	16	0
15	DF	(England) ENG	Jack Simpson	7	0	1+3	0	1+1	0	1	0	0	0	0	0
22	DF	(Poland) POL	Mateusz Żukowski	1	0	0	0	1	0	0	0	0	0	0	0
26	DF	(Nigeria) NGR	Leon Balogun	37	2	17+4	0	2+1	0	2	0	1	0	7+3	2
31	DF	(Croatia) CRO	Borna Barišić	43	0	22+1	0	2	0	1	0	2	0	13+2	0
43	DF	(Scotland) SCO	Leon King	6	0	2+2	0	0+2	0	0	0	0	0	0	0
64	DF	(Scotland) SCO	Adam Devine	2	0	1+1	0	0	0	0	0	0	0	0	0
Midfielders
4	MF	(England) ENG	John Lundstram	48	4	18+9	1	3	0	2	1	1	0	13+2	2
7	MF	(Romania) ROU	Ianis Hagi	27	4	15	2	1	0	1	1	0+3	0	5+2	1
8	MF	(Scotland) SCO	Ryan Jack	22	1	4+5	0	2+1	1	0+1	0	0	0	9	0
10	MF	(Northern Ireland) NIR	Steven Davis	33	1	13+5	0	2+1	0	1	0	2	1	7+2	0
14	MF	(England) ENG	Ryan Kent	46	3	26	2	3	0	1	0	2	0	13+1	1
16	MF	(Wales) WAL	Aaron Ramsey	13	2	5+2	2	3	0	0	0	0	0	1+2	0
17	MF	(Nigeria) NGR	Joe Aribo	57	9	32+2	8	2	0	3	0	1	0	15+2	1
18	MF	(Finland) FIN	Glen Kamara	52	4	29+2	3	1+2	0	3	0	0	0	12+3	1
19	MF	(United States) USA	James Sands	14	0	5+2	0	2	0	0	0	0	0	0+5	0
24	MF	(Nigeria) NGR	Nnamdi Ofoborh	0	0	0	0	0	0	0	0	0	0	0	0
37	MF	(Canada) CAN	Scott Arfield	50	6	18+11	4	1+1	1	1+2	1	2	0	5+9	0
42	MF	(Northern Ireland) NIR	Charlie McCann	4	0	0+2	0	0+2	0	0	0	0	0	0	0
51	MF	(Scotland) SCO	Alex Lowry	7	2	3+1	1	0+3	1	0	0	0	0	0	0
58	MF	(Scotland) SCO	Cole McKinnon	1	1	0+1	1	0	0	0	0	0	0	0	0
Forwards
9	FW	(Ivory Coast) CIV	Amad Diallo	13	3	4+6	3	2+1	0	0	0	0	0	0	0
11	FW	(Switzerland) SUI	Cedric Itten	11	2	3+3	1	1+1	1	0	0	1	0	0+2	0
20	FW	(Colombia) COL	Alfredo Morelos	42	18	25+1	11	1	0	1+2	1	1	1	10+1	5
23	FW	(Scotland) SCO	Scott Wright	37	7	9+10	4	1+2	1	2+1	1	2	0	4+6	1
25	FW	(Jamaica) JAM	Kemar Roofe	36	16	9+12	10	2+2	1	2	3	0	0	4+5	2
30	FW	(Zambia) ZAM	Fashion Sakala	50	12	13+17	9	2+3	3	0+2	0	0+2	0	3+8	0
52	FW	(England) ENG	Tony Weston	1	0	0+1	0	0	0	0	0	0	0	0	0
61	FW	(Northern Ireland) NIR	Ross McCausland	1	0	0+1	0	0	0	0	0	0	0	0	0
Players transferred or loaned out during the season who made an appearance
9	FW	(England) ENG	Jermain Defoe	2	0	0+2	0	0	0	0	0	0	0	0	0
16	DF	(Scotland) SCO	Nathan Patterson	11	0	2+4	0	0	0	2	0	0	0	2+1	0
21	MF	(England) ENG	Brandon Barker	1	0	0	0	1	0	0	0	0	0	0	0
22	MF	(Curaçao) CUW	Juninho Bacuna	12	1	1+5	1	1	0	0+1	0	0	0	1+3	0
27	MF	(Scotland) SCO	Stephen Kelly	2	0	0	0	0	0	0+1	0	0	0	0+1	0

- Last updated: 21 May 2022

Appearances (starts and substitute appearances) and goals include those in Scottish Premiership, League Cup, Scottish Cup, the UEFA Champions League and the UEFA Europa League.

=== Discipline ===
==== Yellow cards ====
As of match played on 21 May 2022

Colour	Player	Cards		
Yellow card	Connor Goldson	12		
Yellow card	James Tavernier	11		
Yellow card	Alfredo Morelos	10		
Yellow card	Borna Barišić	9		
Yellow card	Joe Aribo	9		
Yellow card	Calvin Bassey	8		
Yellow card	Scott Arfield	5		
Yellow card	Ryan Kent |-	5	John Lundstram	
Yellow card	Leon Balogun	5	4	
Yellow card	Allan McGregor		4	
Yellow card	Ryan Jack	3		
Yellow card	Ianis Hagi	3		
Yellow card	Glen Kamara	3		
Yellow card	Kemar Roofe	3		
Yellow card	Fashion Sakala	3		
Yellow card	Juninho Bacuna	2		
Yellow card	Amad Diallo	2		
Yellow card	Jon McLaughlin |-	2	Steven Davis	1
Yellow card	Cedric Itten			1
Yellow card	Leon King			1
Yellow card	Alex Lowry			1
Yellow card	Charlie McCann			1
Yellow card	Nathan Patterson |-	James Sands		1

==== Red cards ====
As of match played on 21 May 2022

Colour	Player	Cards
Red card	Leon Balogun	1
Red card	Glen Kamara	1
Red card	Ryan Kent	1
Red card	John Lundstram	1

=== Clean sheets ===
As of match played on 21 May 2022

No.	Player	Scottish Premiership	Scottish Cup	League Cup	Champions League	Europa League	Total	Appearances
1	Allan McGregor	12	1	0		4	17	48
28	Robby McCrorie	1	0			1	2	2
33	Jon McLaughlin	3	4	2	0		9	16
Total		16	4	2	0	5	27	66
