= Andy Firth =

English footballer

Personal information
- Date of birth: 26 September 1996 (age 30)
- Place of birth: Ripon, England
- Position: Goalkeeper

Team information
- Current team: Altrincham (player-coach)

Youth career
- Cockermouth
- 2007–2015: Liverpool

Senior career*
Years	Team	Apps	(Gls)
2015–2018	Liverpool	0	(0)
2015–2016	→ Witton Albion (loan)	10	(0)
2018	→ Chester (loan)	11	(0)
2018–2019	Barrow	18	(0)
2019–2022	Rangers	1	(0)
2022	→ Partick Thistle (loan)	0	(0)
2022–2024	Connah's Quay Nomads	55	(0)
2026–	Altrincham	0	(0)
- * Club domestic league appearances and goals as of 15:18, 7 August 2026 (UTC)

Andrew Firth (born 26 September 1996) is an English footballer who is a player-goalkeeping coach for Altrincham.

== Early and personal life ==
Firth was born in Ripon, North Yorkshire.

== Career ==
Firth began his career with Cockermouth. He joined Liverpool at under-11 level. He spent time on loan at Witton Albion in 2015, and moved on loan to Chester in January 2018, and made 11 appearances for the club before returning to Liverpool in May. Firth had obtained his coaching badges whilst with the Liverpool Academy, and due to financial constraints at Chester he acted on occasion as coach for loanee Will Jääskeläinen.

After leaving Liverpool in the summer of 2018, he signed for Barrow in July. He moved to Scottish club Rangers in January 2019, after 18 league appearances for Barrow. He made his senior debut for Rangers against Kilmarnock in May 2019. Firth signed a new one-year deal with Rangers on 29 April 2021. On 12 February 2022, Firth joined Partick Thistle on loan in the Scottish Championship.

Firth left Rangers in June 2022, and joined Connah's Quay Nomads in July 2022.

Firth announced on 15 June 2024 he would be leaving Connah's Quay Nomads to join Al Ettifaq as a goalkeeping coach.

In August 2026 he became a player-goalkeeping coach at Altrincham.

== Career statistics ==
As of 12 January 2024

Appearances and goals by club, season and competition
Club	Season	League			Domestic Cup		League Cup		Other		Total	
Club	Season	Division	Apps	Goals	Apps	Goals	Apps	Goals	Apps	Goals	Apps	Goals
Liverpool	2015–16	Premier League	0	0	0	0	0	0	0	0	0	0
Liverpool	2016–17	Premier League	0	0	0	0	0	0	0	0	0	0
Liverpool	2017–18	Premier League	0	0	0	0	0	0	0	0	0	0
Liverpool	Total		0	0	0	0	0	0	0	0	0	0
Witton Albion (loan)	2015–16	NPL Division One North	10	0	0	0	2	0	3 (Note: One appearance in FA Trophy, one appearance in Cheshire Senior Cup, one appearance in Mid-Cheshire Cup)	0	15	0
Chester (loan)	2017–18	National League	11	0	0	0	—		0	0	11	0
Barrow	2018–19	National League	18	0	1	0	—		1 (Note: Appearance in FA Trophy)	0	20	0
Rangers	2018–19	Scottish Premiership	1	0	0	0	0	0	0	0	1	0
Rangers	2019–20	Scottish Premiership	0	0	0	0	0	0	0	0	0	0
Rangers	2020–21	Scottish Premiership	0	0	0	0	0	0	0	0	0	0
Rangers	2021–22	Scottish Premiership	0	0	0	0	0	0	0	0	0	0
Rangers	Total		1	0	0	0	0	0	0	0	1	0
Partick Thistle (loan)	2022–23	Scottish Championship	0	0	0	0	0	0	0	0	0	0
Connah's Quay Nomads	2022–23	Cymru Premier	32	0	5	0	3	0	0	0	40	0
Connah's Quay Nomads	2023–24	Cymru Premier	12	0	3	0	1	0	2 (Note: Appearances in UEFA Europa Conference League)	0	18	0
Connah's Quay Nomads	Total		44	0	8	0	4	0	2	0	58	0
Altrincham	2026–27	National League	0	0	0	0	0	0	0	0	0	0
Career total			84	0	9	0	6	0	6	0	105	0

== Honours ==
Rangers

- Scottish Premiership: 2020–21
