= Sydney Devine =

Scottish singer and whistler (1940–2021)

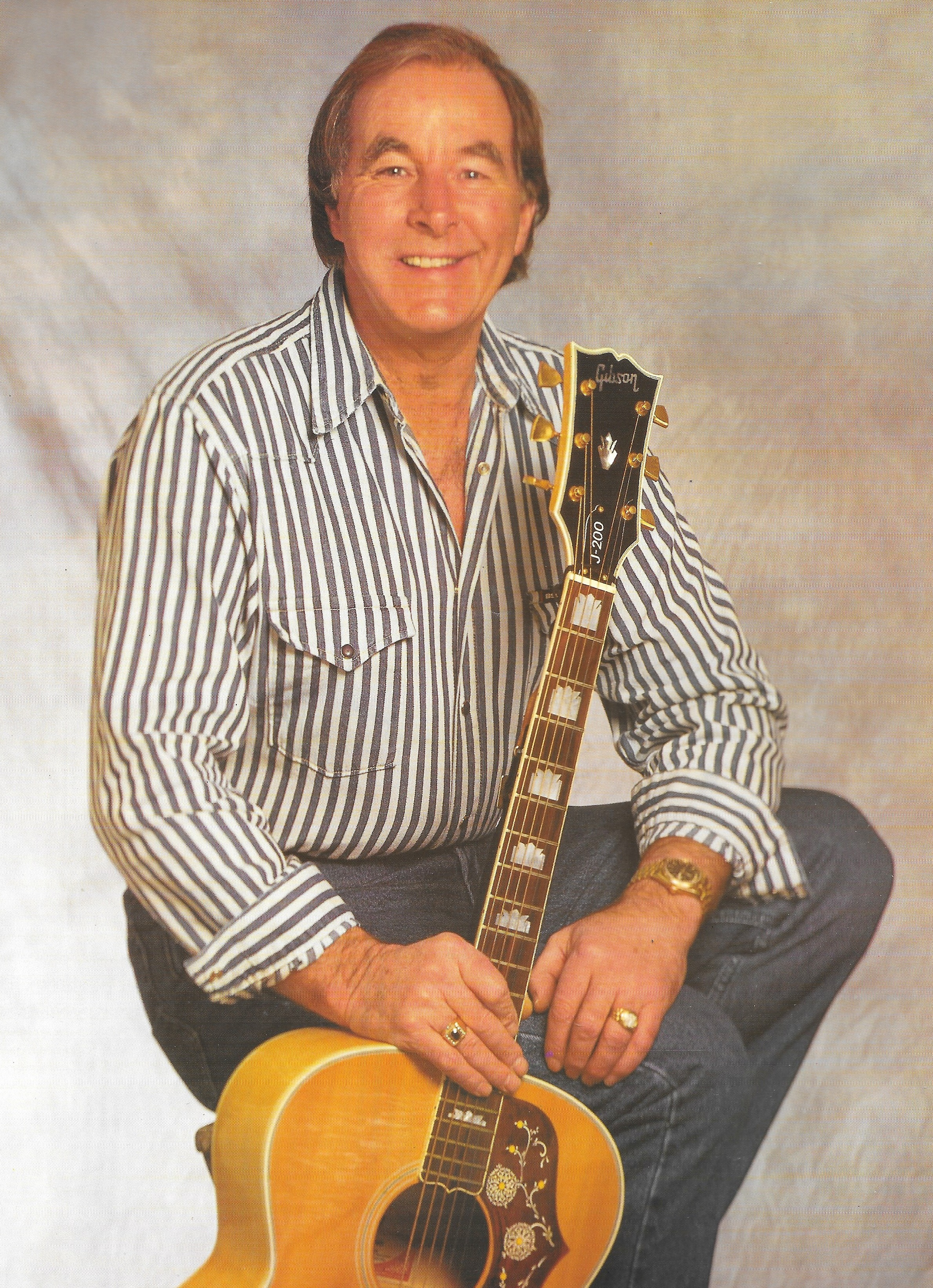

Background information
- Born: 11 January 1940; Bellside, Lanarkshire, Scotland
- Died: 13 February 2021 (aged 81) Ayr, Scotland
- Instruments: Vocals, Whistling

Sydney Devine MBE (11 January 1940 – 13 February 2021) was a Scottish singer and whistler. He sold 15 million albums during his career, reached the UK's top 20 albums chart and was part of the White Heather Club troupe. He was called the Scottish Ronnie Ronalde.

== Life and career ==
Devine was born in Bellside, a settlement near the village of Cleland, North Lanarkshire, in January 1940. His father was a miner while his stay at home mother, nicknamed "Old Nellie" taught Sydney how to whistle as a boy, a hobby he loved. Sydney first achieved a measure of fame as a boy through his whistling, including his extraordinary ability to reproduce bird calls. This was noticed by the tenor Robert Wilson, who invited Devine to whistle during the recording of "Cottage By The Lea".

Known for his charismatic personality, distinctive singing style and rhinestone-encrusted stage suits. He went on to perform his bird whistling set in various venues, including the London Hippodrome as part of the revue "Wild Grows The Heather".

When the theatre run of Wild Grows The Heather finished, he reunited with Wilson in his "White Heather Group" troupe.

In 1957, after entering a Daily Record-sponsored competition to find "Scotland's Tommy Steele" Devine finished second and toured Scotland with the winner, Alex Harvey, later the frontman of his own band.

Whilst with the "White Heather Group" Sydney introduced Rock and Roll to his act and became known, for a short while, as the "Tartan Rocker". He was told after one such performance in Germany that Elvis Presley had been in the audience but this was never verified

Following Robert Wilsons debilitating road accident The White Heather franchise was taken over by Andy Stewart and latterly became the White Heather Club

Devine played guitar on Andy Stewart's hit "Donald Where's Your Troosers?", and while touring with Stewart in South Africa, Devine recorded his first two albums with RPM who then sold them to Emerald Gem thus beginning Sydney's recording career that would see him sell over 15 million albums worldwide.

In the 1970s, he had his own show on STV, Devine Time. It featured star guests such as Peters and Lee and Lena Zavaroni.

Devine worked with many major musicians including Roy Orbison, Box-Car Willie and Dolly Parton.

In the 1970s, Sydney had his own weekly shows on Radio Clyde where he coined the catchphrase: "get the kettle on, Shirley". After leaving the station, he presented popular shows on West Sound Radio in Ayr.

Devine was affectionately known as 'The Caruso of Cleland' and 'Steak and Kidney'.

== Personal life ==
In 2003, Devine became a Member of the Order of the British Empire (MBE) for services to entertainment in Scotland.

2019 saw Devine listed in the Guinness Book of Records for the longest running stage show in a theatre following 43 years at Glasgow's Pavilion Theatre.

Devine was a Freemason and was a member of Masonic Lodge 571 Dramatic Glasgow. Other famous members of this lodge include Sir Harry Lauder, Izzy Bonn PM, Ben Gunn PM, Andy Stewart, Tom and Jack Alexander and Arthur J Jefferson (father of Stan Laurel).

His grandson, Adam Devine, is a professional footballer.

== Death ==
Devine died at University Hospital Ayr on 13 February 2021, at the age of 81. In 2026, a plaque commemorating his life was unveiled at Cleland Primary School.

== Albums ==
1. Your Favourite Country Songs (Emerald – 1970)
2. Country (Emerald – 1973)
3. Encores (Emerald – 1974)
4. Crying Time (Emerald – 1974)
5. The Very Best Of (Emerald – 1975)
6. Absolutely Devine (Emerald – 1975)
7. Live At The City Hall, Glasgow (Emerald – 1975)
8. Live At The City Hall, Glasgow (Pickwick – 1976)
9. Doubly Devine (Philips – 1976)
10. This Song is Just for You (Sunset – 1976)
11. Devine Time (Philips – 1976)
12. The Collection (Pickwick 1977)
13. Greatest Hits (Emerald 1977)
14. Almost Persuaded (Philips – 1977)
15. Nashville Album (Philips – 1978)
16. My World of Music (Philips – 1979)
17. 20 Golden Greats (Ronco 1980)
18. 25th Anniversary Album (Philips 1980)
19. The Pride of Bonnie Scotland (Phonodisc 1980)
20. Heartaches (Philips 1981)
21. Take My Hand, Precious Lord (Emerald)
22. Favourite Memories of Mine (Country House)
23. By Request (Country House)
24. From Scotland With Love (Scotdisc)
25. Hits Jackpot (Country House)
26. Always & Forever (Scotdisc)
27. Green Green Grass of Home (Scotdisc)
28. The Very Best Of (MCA)
29. Norfolk Country (Scotdisc)
30. Crying Time (Homeland)
31. Crying Time (Emporio)
32. 50 Country Winners (Prism)
33. Line Dance Party (Scotdisc)
34. Line Dance Party 2 (Scotdisc)
35. Crying Time (Prism)
36. Simply Devine (Scotdisc)
37. Dance Party (Scotdisc)
38. Big Country Line Dance Party (Scotdisc)
39. 40 Greatest Hits (Emerald)
40. The Best Of (Music Delta)
41. Crying Time (Emerald)
42. You Can Dance (with Tommy Scott) (Scotdisc – 2005)
43. When I Stop Dreaming (Scotdisc – 2006)
44. Line Dance Party (Scotdisc – 2007)
45. Skiffle Country (Scotdisc – 2010)
46. Tiny Bubbles and the Signature Songs (Scotdisc – 2012)
47. Nashville Country (Scotdisc 2014)
48. Love Songs (Scotdisc 2015)
49. It Is No Secret (Emerald 2015)
50. I'm Back (Scotdisc 2019)
51. ‘’I’ll Remember You ‘’ (Scotdisc 2022)
