= Scott Arfield =

Footballer (born 1988)

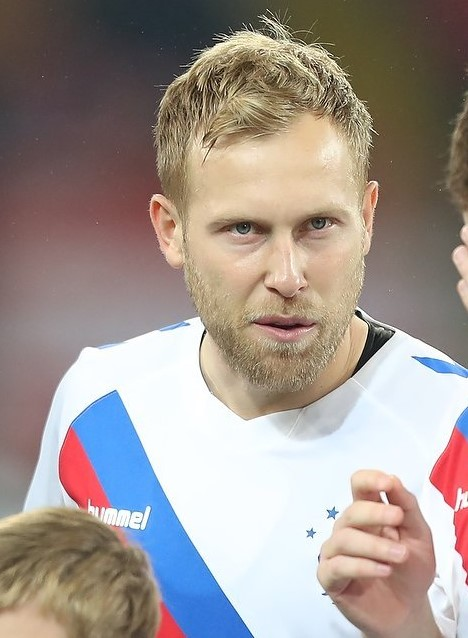
- Arfield with Rangers in 2018

Personal information
- Full name: Scott Harry Nathaniel Arfield
- Date of birth: 1 November 1988 (age 38)
- Place of birth: Livingston, Scotland
- Height: 5 ft 10 in (1.78 m)
- Position: Midfielder

Team information
- Current team: East Fife (Player/Manager)

Youth career
- Falkirk

Senior career*
Years	Team	Apps	(Gls)
2007–2010	Falkirk	108	(13)
2010–2013	Huddersfield Town	96	(7)
2013–2018	Burnley	177	(21)
2018–2023	Rangers	143	(29)
2023–2024	Charlotte FC	27	(2)
2024–2025	Bolton Wanderers	12	(0)
2025	Falkirk	28	(10)
2026	Livingston	8	(0)
2026-	East Fife	0	(0)

International career
2007	Scotland U19	2	(0)
2007–2010	Scotland U21	17	(3)
2009	Scotland B	1	(0)
2016–2019	Canada	20	(4)
2019	Canada B	1	(2)

Managerial career
- 2026: Livingston (interim)
- 2026-: East Fife
- * Club domestic league appearances and goals as of 18 June 2026

Scott Harry Nathaniel Arfield (born 1 November 1988) is a professional footballer who plays as a midfielder. He is currently player/manager at East Fife. Born and raised in Scotland, Arfield represented his nation of birth at international youth levels before switching to Canada in 2015.

He began his career at Falkirk before moving to the English leagues for eight years with Huddersfield Town and Burnley. He returned to Scottish football in 2018, playing five seasons for Rangers. In 2025, 18 years after making his debut for the club, he returned to Falkirk. In 2026 he moved to Livingston FC on a short contract until the end of the 2025–26 season.

Now the Player / Manager of East Fife until summer 2029.

== Early life and education ==
Arfield attended St Margaret's Academy, Livingston.

== Club career ==
=== Falkirk ===
Arfield came up through the Falkirk Youth Academy and earned promotion to the first team squad. He made his Falkirk debut on 4 August 2007, in their 4–0 win away at Gretna on the opening day of the 2007–08 season.

His first goal came in Falkirk's 4–2 defeat at Inverness Caledonian Thistle. He then scored twice in a 4–0 win over St Mirren. He won the Scottish Premier League Young Player of the Month award for December 2007. Arfield signed a new five-year contract with Falkirk in February 2008. He finished the season with three goals in 35 SPL appearances.

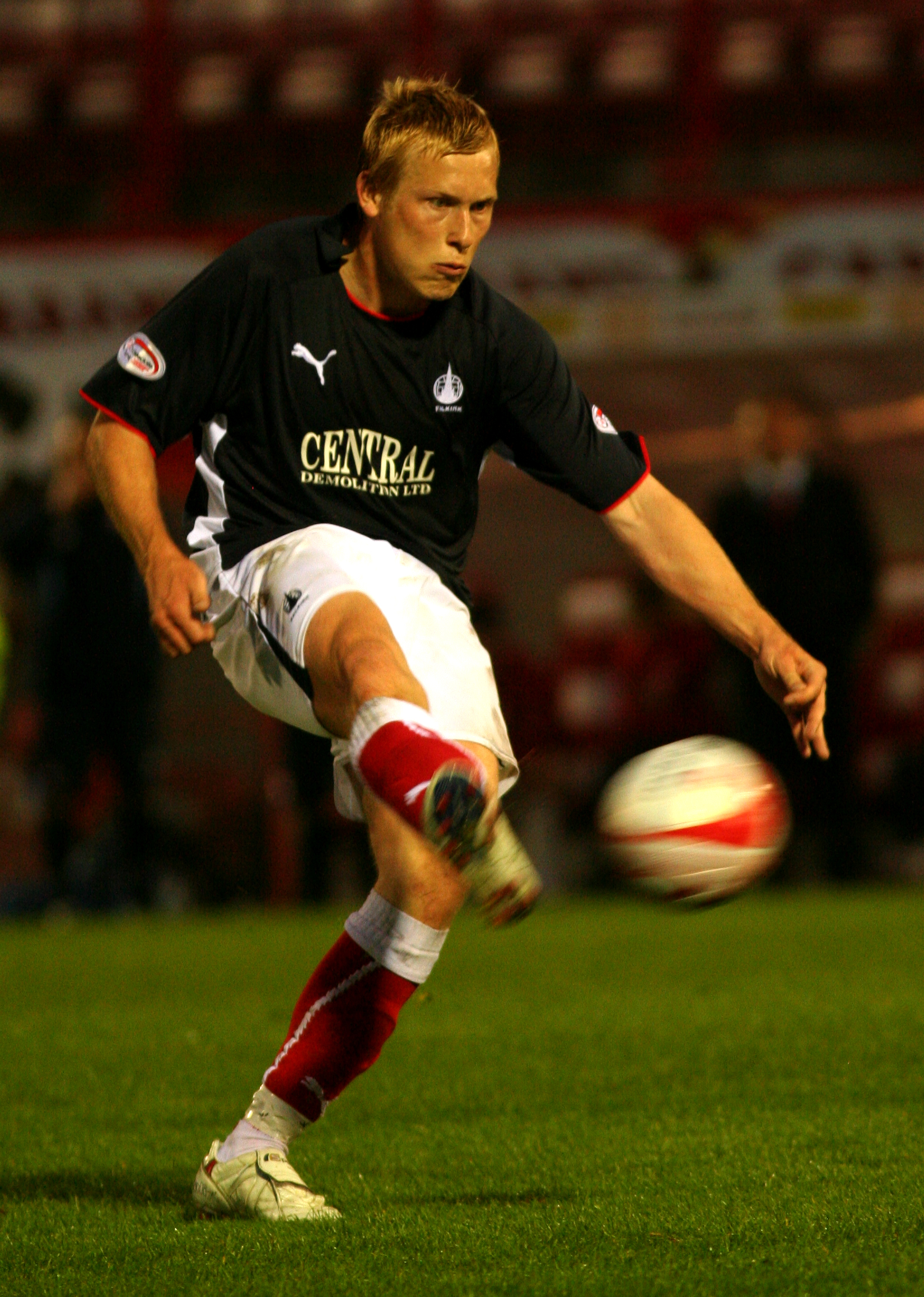
Arfield playing for Falkirk in 2009

During the 2008–09 season Arfield won his second Young Player of the Month award, this time winning for September 2008. He was in the Falkirk side that were Scottish Cup runners-up, losing 1–0 to Rangers in the final at Hampden Park. Arfield scored 10 goals in the 2008–09 season, seven of them coming in the league.

He was given the number 10 jersey, previously worn by Steven Pressley, for the 2009–10 season. Hamilton Academical offered £100,000 for Arfield in August 2009, but this was rejected by Falkirk, who commented that they "thought they had missed out a zero in the figure they offered".

Arfield's first appearance of the 2009–10 season came in a 1–0 home win over FC Vaduz in the UEFA Europa League, the club's first ever match in European competition. He finished the season with three goals from 36 appearances as the club were relegated from the SPL.

Speculation began to grow that Arfield was to leave Falkirk following their relegation from the SPL. On 17 May 2010, it was confirmed that Arfield was having talks with Huddersfield Town and was to have a medical at the club. Falkirk had already turned down offers from Hamilton Academical, Hibernian, Hearts and Southampton.

Arfield left Falkirk after playing 108 games, scoring 13 times between 2007 and 2010. He made his last appearance for Falkirk in the 0–0 draw with Kilmarnock that confirmed relegation on the last day of the season.

=== Huddersfield Town ===
On 21 May 2010, it was reported that Arfield had signed for Huddersfield Town for a reported fee initially in the region of £400,000 but potentially rising to over £600,000 after a certain number of appearances. The move was confirmed three days later, after the club and the player had agreed personal terms. He made his Huddersfield debut in the 3–0 win over Notts County at Meadow Lane on 7 August 2010.

On 11 September 2010, he scored his first goal for the Terriers at Brisbane Road against Leyton Orient, where Town won 2–1. A week later, he scored his first goal at the Galpharm Stadium against Yeovil Town, in a 4–2 win for the home side.

Arfield was a regular in the Huddersfield side, making 38 appearances and scoring twice in all competitions as they finished the season as Play-off champions and gained promotion to the Championship after beating Sheffield United on penalties in the Wembley final, Arfield scoring his penalty to make it 2–1 as Huddersfield won by 8–7. Arfield made fewer appearances in Town's first season in the Championship, and at the end of the season was released along with Tom Clarke and Alan Lee.

=== Burnley ===
After leaving Huddersfield, Arfield went on trial with Burnley and scored in the 3–0 win over Cork City on 15 July 2013, before signing a two-year deal 4 days later with the Clarets. Arfield selected the number 37 shirt in memory of fellow Falkirk youth player Craig Gowans, who wore the same squad number when he was tragically killed in a training ground accident in 2005. He scored his first professional goal for Burnley on 6 August 2013, in a 4–0 win against York City in the League Cup.

Arfield scored 9 goals in 49 competitive appearances for Burnley during the 2013–14 season. Burnley won promotion to the Premier League and Arfield signed a three-year contract with the club in July 2014. Arfield scored on his Premier League debut for Burnley against Chelsea in the 14th minute of their opening game of the season.

=== Rangers ===
Arfield returned to Scotland and signed a four-year deal with Rangers on 14 May 2018. He made his debut for the club on 12 July 2018 in a Europa League qualification tie against FK Shkupi of Macedonia, and made his Scottish Premiership debut a few weeks later on 5 August, against Aberdeen. On 7 April 2019, Arfield scored his first professional hat-trick in a 3–0 victory against Motherwell.

In May 2023, Rangers announced Arfield would depart the club upon the expiration of his contract.

=== Charlotte FC ===
In June 2023, Arfield joined Major League Soccer club Charlotte FC on a contract through the end of 2024, with an option for 2025. He made his debut for his new club on 5 July, as a substitute against New York City FC. Arfield scored his first goal for Charlotte on 29 July, netting the third goal in an eventual 4-1 victory against Necaxa in the 2023 Leagues Cup.

=== Bolton Wanderers ===
On 12 July 2024, Arfield signed a one-year contract with EFL League One club Bolton Wanderers and made his debut on 10 August in a 2-1 victory at Leyton Orient.

=== Return to Falkirk ===
On 3 February 2025, 15 years after originally departing the club, Arfield returned to Falkirk on a six month deal with the option of a further year. Five days later he scored 45 seconds into his return debut, a Scottish Championship fixture against Partick Thistle, and went on to complete a hat-trick as Falkirk won 5–2. In December 2025, Arfield departed Falkirk F.C. at his own request.

=== Livingston ===
In January 2026, on his own request, Arfield moved to Livingston on a short term contract until the end of the 2025/2026 season. He was appointed interim manager on 7 May 2026, following the resignation of Marvin Bartley for the final three matches of the season. Following the end of the season, Arfield left the club at the conclusion of his contract.

== International career ==
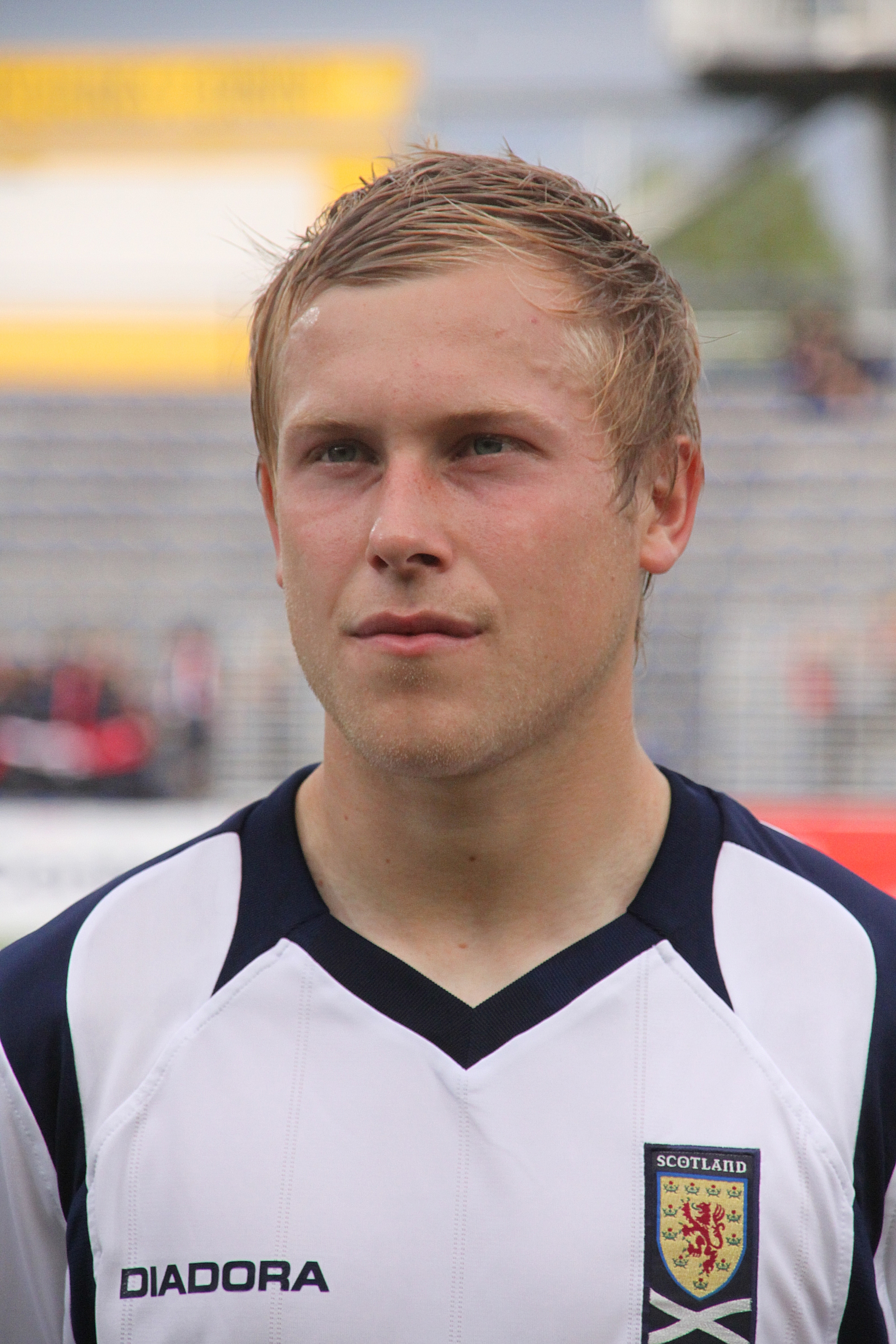
Arfield in the Scotland U21 Squad

=== Scotland ===
Arfield represented Scotland at under-19, under-21 and B international levels. He made his debut for Scotland under-19 in a 3–1 away friendly victory over Austria. His second and last outing for the under-19s came four days later in the 2–1 home win over Norway, coming on as a substitute for Alex Pearce in the 65th minute of the game.

Arfield was then a member of the Scotland under-21 squad, being called up for the first time in October 2007. His debut came in a 4–0 defeat against Netherlands on 16 October 2007. He was a regular in Billy Stark's squad throughout the 2009 and 2011 European qualifying campaigns. Arfield's first goal for the under-21s came in a 2–2 draw with Ukraine on 6 February 2008.

Arfield received his first cap for Scotland B against Northern Ireland at the Excelsior Stadium in Airdrie on 6 May 2009. Scotland won the game 3–0.

=== Canada ===
Arfield also qualified to play for Canada, because his father was born in Toronto. In February 2016, it was widely reported that Arfield was prepared to file his one-time switch paperwork with FIFA, which was needed for him to join the Canada squad. In March 2016, Arfield was included in Canada's 23-man squad for their World Cup Qualification match against Mexico.

He made his debut on 25 March as a second-half substitute for Tosaint Ricketts in a 3–0 home defeat to Mexico at BC Place. Arfield was named to Canada's squad for the 2017 CONCACAF Gold Cup on 27 June 2017. His first goal for Canada came in the tournament opener against French Guiana on 7 July.

In 2018, at the opening of Canada's Nations League campaign, Arfield was named captain of the squad in their match against U.S. Virgin Islands. In May 2019, Arfield was named to the squad for the 2019 CONCACAF Gold Cup. During an unofficial training match prior to the 2019 Gold Cup on 10 June, he scored both goals in a 2–0 win against Trinidad and Tobago.

In October 2020 Rangers coach Steven Gerrard suggested that Arfield had retired from international duty. Arfield later refuted the claim in an interview with Rangers TV, stating that his continued involvement with Canada would be up to coach John Herdman. After missing Canada's 2022 World Cup qualifiers in March and June 2021, Arfield was named to the provisional 60-man squad for the 2021 CONCACAF Gold Cup, but did not make the final 23-man team.

In January 2022 Arfield announced his international retirement.

== Career statistics ==
=== Club ===
As of 18 June 2026

Appearances and goals by club, season and competition
Club	Season	League			National cup		League cup		Other		Total	
Club	Season	Division	Apps	Goals	Apps	Goals	Apps	Goals	Apps	Goals	Apps	Goals
Falkirk	2007–08	Scottish Premier League	35	3	2	0	2	0	—		39	3
Falkirk	2008–09	Scottish Premier League	37	7	4	3	4	0	—		45	10
Falkirk	2009–10	Scottish Premier League	36	3	1	0	1	0	2 (Note: Appearances in UEFA Europa League)	0	40	3
Falkirk	Total		108	13	7	3	7	0	2	0	124	16
Huddersfield Town	2010–11	League One	40	4	5	1	2	0	6 (Note: Four appearances and one goal in Football League Trophy, two appearances in League One play-offs)	1	53	6
Huddersfield Town	2011–12	League One	35	2	1	0	1	0	3 (Note: One appearance in Football League Trophy, two appearances in League One play-offs)	0	40	2
Huddersfield Town	2012–13	Championship	21	1	4	0	1	0	—		26	1
Huddersfield Town	Total		96	7	10	1	4	0	9	1	119	9
Burnley	2013–14	Championship	45	8	1	0	3	1	—		49	9
Burnley	2014–15	Premier League	37	2	2	0	1	0	—		40	2
Burnley	2015–16	Championship	46	8	2	0	1	0	—		49	8
Burnley	2016–17	Premier League	31	1	3	0	1	0	—		35	1
Burnley	2017–18	Premier League	18	2	0	0	2	0	—		20	2
Burnley	Total		177	21	8	0	8	1	—		193	22
Rangers	2018–19	Scottish Premiership	29	11	4	0	2	0	11	1	46	12
Rangers	2019–20	Scottish Premiership	26	5	3	3	3	0	17	1	49	9
Rangers	2020–21	Scottish Premiership	28	4	2	0	2	0	13	3	45	7
Rangers	2021–22	Scottish Premiership	29	4	2	1	3	1	16 (Note: Two appearances in UEFA Champions League, fourteen appearances in UEFA Europa League)	0	50	6
Rangers	2022–23	Scottish Premiership	31	5	3	1	3	2	6 (Note: Appearances in UEFA Champions League)	1	43	9
Rangers	Total		143	29	14	5	13	3	63	6	233	43
Charlotte FC	2023	Major League Soccer	13	2	—		—		6 (Note: Five appearances and one goal in Leagues Cup, one appearance in MLS Cup Playoffs)	1	19	3
Charlotte FC	2024	Major League Soccer	14	0	—		—		0	0	14	0
Charlotte FC	Total		27	2	—		—		6	1	33	3
Bolton Wanderers	2024–25	League One	12	0	1	0	3	0	0	0	16	0
Falkirk	2024–25	Scottish Championship	13	9	0	0	0	0	—		13	9
Falkirk	2025–26	Scottish Premiership	15	1	0	0	5	3	—		20	4
Falkirk	Total		28	10	0	0	5	3	-		33	13
Livingston	2025–26	Scottish Premiership	8	0	1	1	0	0	—		9	1
Career total			599	79	41	10	40	7	80	8	760	107

=== International ===
Appearances and goals by national team and year
National team	Year	Apps	Goals
Canada	2016	6	0
Canada	2017	6	1
Canada	2018	1	0
Canada	2019	7	3
Total		20	4

Scores and results list Canada's goal tally first, score column indicates score after each Arfield goal.

List of international goals scored by Scott Arfield
No.	Date	Venue	Cap	Opponent	Score	Result	Competition
1	7 July 2017	Red Bull Arena, Harrison, United States	8	French Guiana	2–0	4–2	2017 CONCACAF Gold Cup
2	10 June 2019	Titan Stadium, Fullerton, United States	14	Trinidad and Tobago	1–0	2–0	Friendly
3	10 June 2019	Titan Stadium, Fullerton, United States	14	Trinidad and Tobago	2–0	2–0	Friendly
4	15 June 2019	Rose Bowl, Pasadena, United States	15	Martinique	4–0	4–0	2019 CONCACAF Gold Cup

=== Managerial ===
As of matches played 14 November 2026

Managerial record by team and tenure
Team	From	To	Record					Ref.
Team	From	To	P	W	D	L	Win %	Ref.
Livingston (interim)	7 May 2026	17 May 2026	3	0	1	2	0.0	
East Fife (Player/Manager)	8 November 2026	Present	1	1	0	0	100.0	
Total			4	1	1	2	25.0	

== Honours ==
Falkirk

- Scottish Championship: 2024–25
- Scottish Cup runner-up: 2008–09

Huddersfield Town

- Football League One play-offs: 2012

Burnley

- Football League Championship: 2015–16; runner-up: 2013–14

Rangers

- Scottish Premiership: 2020–21
- Scottish Cup: 2021–22
- Scottish League Cup runner-up: 2019–20
- UEFA Europa League runner-up: 2021–22
