= Kieran Wright =

Scottish footballer

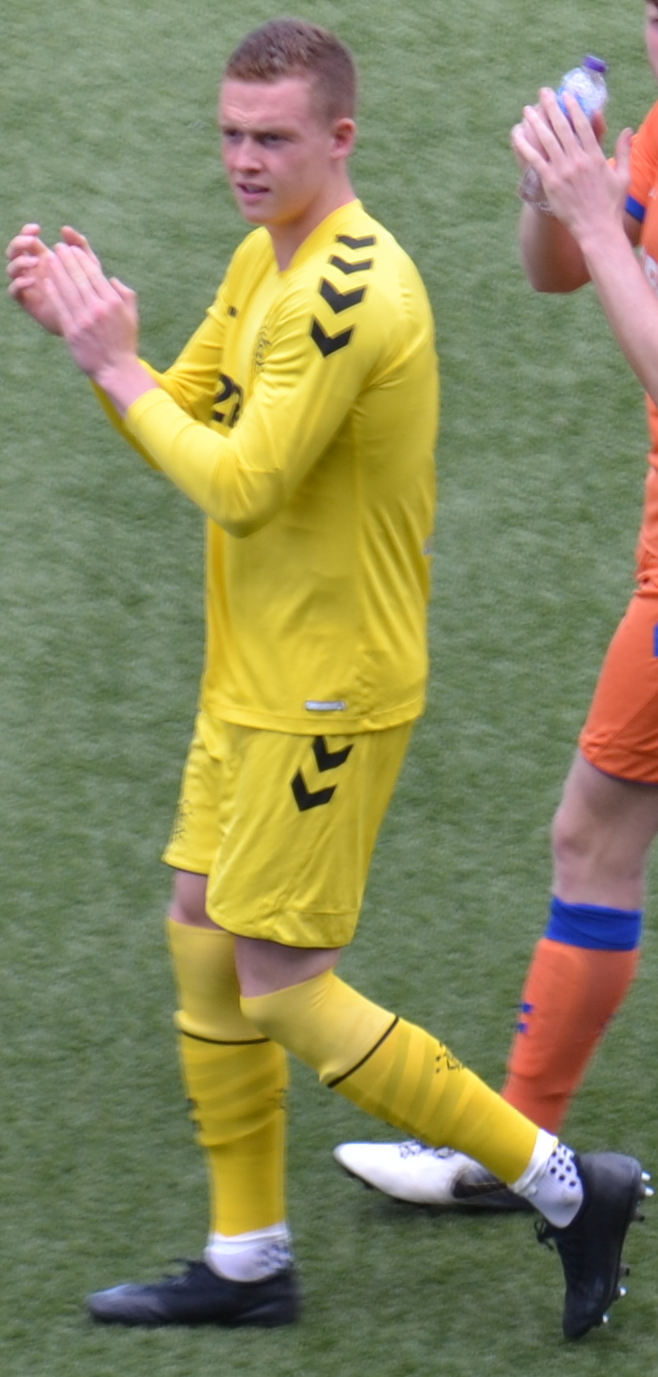
- Wright in 2019

Personal information
- Date of birth: 1 April 1999 (age 27)
- Place of birth: Stepps, North Lanarkshire, Scotland
- Height: 6 ft 2 in (1.89 m)
- Position: Goalkeeper

Team information
- Current team: Heart of Midlothian
- Number: 34

Youth career
- Garnkirk United BC
- Rangers

Senior career*
Years	Team	Apps	(Gls)
2016–2026	Rangers	0	(0)
2016–2017	→ Gala Fairydean Rovers (loan)		
2018	→ Albion Rovers (loan)	12	(0)
2018	→ Raith Rovers (loan)	7	(0)
2020	→ Alloa Athletic (loan)	4	(0)
2020–2021	→ Partick Thistle (loan)	12	(0)
2021	→ Alloa Athletic (loan)	1	(0)
2022	→ Dumbarton (loan)	12	(0)
2024	→ Livingston (loan)	1	(0)
2024–2025	→ Airdrieonians (loan)	16	(0)
2026	→ Kilmarnock (loan)	0	(0)
2026–	Heart of Midlothian	0	(0)

International career^{‡}
2016	Scotland U17	1	(0)
2017–2018	Scotland U19	7	(0)
2020	Scotland U21	1	(0)
- * Club domestic league appearances and goals as of 15:28, 19 June 2026 (UTC) ‡ National team caps and goals as of 20:51, 17 October 2020 (UTC)

Kieran Wright (born 1 April 1999) is a Scottish footballer who plays as a goalkeeper for Scottish Premiership side Heart of Midlothian. Wright has also played for Scotland at under-17, under-19 and Scotland national under-21 team levels.

== Club career ==
Wright started his career at Rangers, he signed a professional contract with the club in March 2016, lasting until 2018.

In August 2016, he joined Gala Fairydean Rovers on loan until the end of the year. His loan was later extended until the end of the season, with him winning the club's Player's Player of the Year and Young Player of the Year awards for the 2016–17 season.

He joined Albion Rovers on loan until the end of the month on 4 January 2018. He made his debut for the club on 27 January 2018 in a 3–1 defeat to Stranraer. He extended his loan to the end of the season on 31 January. In February 2018, he extended his contract with Rangers. He appeared in twelve league matches for Albion Rovers.

In August 2018, he joined Raith Rovers on loan until the end of December. He made his debut for the club on 4 August 2018 in a 1–1 draw with Stranraer. He made seven league appearances for Raith Rovers.

In December 2019, he signed a new deal with the club, lasting until summer 2021. On 30 January 2020, he joined Scottish Championship side Alloa Athletic on loan until the end of the season. He made his debut for Alloa on 1 February 2020 in their 1–1 Scottish Championship draw with Inverness Caledonian Thistle. He played four times for Alloa in the Scottish Championship during the 2019–20 season.

On 27 August 2020, he joined Scottish League One side Partick Thistle on a season-long loan. He made 15 appearances on loan at the club. After a one game emergency loan spell at Alloa Athletic in November 2021, Wright joined fellow Scottish League One side Dumbarton on loan until the end of the season in January 2022. On 29 May 2023, Wright signed a contract extension with Rangers until the summer of 2025.

Wright joined Livingston on an emergency loan on 3 May 2024. He made his first and only appearance for Livingston on 19 May 2024, in the Scottish Premiership, coming on as a substitute for Shamal George, in a 1-1 draw at home against Hibernian.

On 5 July 2024, Wright joined Scottish Championship club Airdrieonians on a season-long loan. On 3 July 2025, Wright signed a further extension to his Rangers contract by agreeing a deal until the summer of 2026 and assuming the role of third choice goalkeeper. On 30 April 2026, Wright joined Kilmarnock on a seven-day emergency loan. The loan was later extended.

After leaving Rangers at the end of his contract, he featured as a trialist for Scottish League One side Queen of the South during their Scottish League Cup match on 11 July 2026. The following month, he again appeared as a trialist, this time playing for East Kilbride in their Scottish Challenge Cup match.

On 14 August 2026, he joined Scottish Premiership side Heart of Midlothian on a short term deal until January 2027.

== International career ==
He has played for Scotland at under-17, under-19 and under-21 levels.

== Career statistics ==
As of 08:00, 2 August 2023 (UTC)

Appearances and goals by club, season and competition
Club	Season	League			Scottish Cup		League Cup		Other		Total	
Club	Season	Division	Apps	Goals	Apps	Goals	Apps	Goals	Apps	Goals	Apps	Goals
Rangers	2016–17	Scottish Premiership	0	0	—		0	0	0	0	0	0
Rangers	2017–18	Scottish Premiership	0	0	0	0	0	0	0	0	0	0
Rangers	2018–19	Scottish Premiership	0	0	0	0	0	0	0	0	0	0
Rangers	2019–20	Scottish Premiership	0	0	0	0	0	0	0	0	0	0
Rangers	2020–21	Scottish Premiership	0	0	—		—		0	0	0	0
Rangers	2021–22	Scottish Premiership	0	0	0	0	0	0	0	0	0	0
Rangers	2022–23	Scottish Premiership	0	0	0	0	0	0	0	0	0	0
Rangers	2023–24	Scottish Premiership	0	0	0	0	0	0	0	0	0	0
Rangers	Total		0	0	0	0	0	0	0	0	0	0
Gala Fairydean Rovers (loan) (Note: Gala Fairydean Rovers statistics other than Scottish Cup unavailable)	2016–17	Lowland Football League	—		2	0	—				2	0
Albion Rovers (loan)	2017–18	Scottish League One	12	0	1	0	0	0	0	0	13	0
Raith Rovers (loan)	2018–19	Scottish League One	7	0	0	0	0	0	2 (Note: Appearance(s) in Scottish Challenge Cup)	0	9	0
Rangers U20	2019–20	—			—		—		4	0	4	0
Rangers U20	2021–22	—			—		—		1	0	1	0
Rangers U20	2023–24	—			—		—		1	0	1	0
Rangers U20	Total		0	0	0	0	0	0	6	0	6	0
Alloa Athletic (loan)	2019–20	Scottish Championship	4	0	0	0	0	0	0	0	4	0
Partick Thistle (loan)	2020–21	Scottish League One	12	0	2	0	1	0	0	0	15	0
Alloa Athletic (loan)	2021–22	Scottish League One	1	0	0	0	0	0	0	0	1	0
Dumbarton (loan)	2021–22	Scottish League One	12	0	0	0	0	0	2	0	14	0
Career total			48	0	5	0	1	0	10	0	64	0

== Honours ==
=== Club ===
Partick Thistle

- Scottish League One: 2020–21
