= Adam Devine (footballer) =

Scottish footballer (born 2003)

Personal information
- Full name: Adam Gary Devine
- Date of birth: 25 March 2003 (age 23)
- Place of birth: Glasgow, Scotland
- Height: 1.90 m (6 ft 3 in)
- Position: Right-back

Team information
- Current team: Airdrieonians
- Number: 14

Youth career
- Rangers

Senior career*
| Years | Team | Apps | (Gls) |
| 2021–2025 | Rangers | 8 | (0) |
| 2021 | → Partick Thistle (loan) | 0 | (0) |
| 2021 | → Brechin City (loan) | 11 | (0) |
| 2024 | → Motherwell (loan) | 10 | (1) |
| 2025 | → Queen's Park (loan) | 13 | (1) |
| 2026– | Airdrieonians | 6 | (2) |

International career
| 2018–2019 | Scotland U16 | 5 | (0) |
| 2019 | Scotland U17 | 3 | (0) |
| 2021–2022 | Scotland U19 | 6 | (0) |
| 2022– | Scotland U21 | 8 | (0) |
- * Club domestic league appearances and goals as of 4 May 2026

Adam Gary Devine (born 23 March 2003) is a Scottish footballer who plays for Scottish League One club Airdrieonians. He is the grandson of musician Sydney Devine.

== Career ==
Devine, a product of the Rangers Academy, signed a contract extension with Rangers until 2022 on 29 September 2020. On 6 March 2021, Devine joined then Scottish Championship side Partick Thistle on loan for the rest of the season. The move was cut short after two weeks and Devine joined then League Two side Brechin City on 23 March. He made eleven league appearances for City, his first being a start in a 2-0 defeat away to Stranraer on 23 March 2021.

On 8 June 2021, Devine was one of five youth players who signed new contracts at Rangers, with the former agreeing a deal to the summer of 2023. Devine made his debut for Rangers by replacing James Tavernier as a 66th minute substitute during a 2–0 win over Dundee United on 8 May 2022.

In January 2026, Devine joined Scottish Championship club Airdrieonians.

== International career ==
Devine has represented Scotland at various levels and has played twice for the under-21s team.

== Career statistics ==
As of match played 27 May 2023

Appearances and goals by club, season and competition
| Club | Season | League | | | National cup | | League cup | | Other | | Total | |
| Club | Season | Division | Apps | Goals | Apps | Goals | Apps | Goals | Apps | Goals | Apps | Goals |
|---|---|---|---|---|---|---|---|---|---|---|---|---|
| Rangers | 2020–21 | Scottish Premiership | 0 | 0 | 0 | 0 | 0 | 0 | 0 | 0 | 0 | 0 |
| Rangers | 2021–22 | Scottish Premiership | 2 | 0 | 0 | 0 | 0 | 0 | 0 | 0 | 2 | 0 |
| Rangers | 2022–23 | Scottish Premiership | 6 | 0 | 0 | 0 | 2 | 0 | 0 | 0 | 8 | 0 |
| Rangers | Total | | 8 | 0 | 0 | 0 | 2 | 0 | 0 | 0 | 10 | 0 |
| Brechin City | 2020–21 | Scottish League Two | 11 | 0 | — | | — | | 0 | 0 | 11 | 0 |
| Rangers B | 2021–22 | — | | | — | | — | | 4 (Note: Appearances in Scottish Challenge Cup) | 0 | 4 | 0 |
| Rangers B | 2022–23 | — | | | — | | — | | 1 (Note: Appearance in Scottish Challenge Cup) | 0 | 1 | 0 |
| Career total | | | 19 | 0 | 0 | 0 | 2 | 0 | 5 | 0 | 26 | 0 |

== Honours ==
Rangers F.C.

- Scottish League Cup: 2023-24
