= Cole McKinnon =

Scottish footballer

Personal information
- Date of birth: 29 January 2003 (age 23)
- Place of birth: Cambuslang, Scotland
- Position: Central midfielder

Team information
- Current team: Airdrieonians
- Number: 24

Youth career
- Drumsagard Football Academy
- Rangers

Senior career*
Years	Team	Apps	(Gls)
2020–2025	Rangers	2	(1)
2021	→ East Fife (loan)	9	(0)
2022–2023	→ Partick Thistle (loan)	22	(3)
2025	→ Ayr United (loan)	12	(0)
2025–	Airdrieonians	37	(3)
- * Club domestic league appearances and goals as of 13:42, 2 October 2026 (UTC)

Cole McKinnon (born 29 January 2003) is a Scottish footballer who plays for Airdrieonians as a centre midfielder.

He was on Rangers' books and has had loan spells with Scottish Professional Football League sides East Fife, Partick Thistle and Ayr United.

== Career ==
McKinnon, a product of the Rangers Academy, signed a contract extension with Rangers until 2022, on 29 September 2020. On 12 March 2021, he joined then Scottish League One side East Fife on loan for the rest of the season. He made nine league appearances for the Fifers, his first being a late substitute appearance in a 3–1 win away to Clyde on 20 March 2021.

McKinnon made his debut for Rangers by replacing Aaron Ramsey as a 60th-minute substitute during a 3–1 win over Heart of Midlothian on 14 May 2022, and scored the final goal.

He made his European debut on 7 March 2024, when he came on as substitute, when Rangers drew 2–2 with Benfica, in the Estadio da Luz in Lisbon.

On 8 January 2025, McKinnon joined Ayr United for the remainder of the season.

== Honours ==
Rangers F.C.

- Scottish League Cup: 2023-24
