= 2019–20 Rangers F.C. season =

Rangers
2019–20 season
- Chairman: Dave King
- Manager: Steven Gerrard
- Ground: Ibrox Stadium
- Scottish Premiership: 2nd
- Scottish Cup: Quarter-finals
- League Cup: Runners-up
- Europa League: Round of 16
- Top goalscorer: League: Jermain Defoe (13); All: Alfredo Morelos (29)
- Highest home attendance: 50,012 (v Aberdeen, 1 February 2020)
- Lowest home attendance: 38,560 (v Stranraer, 17 January 2020)
- Average home league attendance: 49,237
Home colours	Away colours	Third colours

The 2019–20 season was the 140th season of competitive football by Rangers.

On 13 March 2020, the Scottish football season was suspended with immediate effect due to the COVID-19 Coronavirus outbreak.

The Premiership was curtailed on 18 May 2020, with average points per game used to determine final league positions.

Rangers completed their UEFA Europa League campaign in August 2020.

== Results and fixtures ==
Win Draw Loss Postponed

=== Pre-season and friendlies ===
29 June 2019 Friendly	Rangers	2−0	Mansfield Town	Algarve, Portugal
	Ojo 20'; Docherty 88'	Report		Stadium: The Campus
Note: The match was played behind closed doors.

3 July 2019 Friendly	Rangers	1−0	The New Saints	Auchenhowie
	Defoe 14'	Report		Stadium: The Hummel Training Centre
Note: The match was played behind closed doors.

7 July 2019 Friendly	Rangers	5–0	Oxford United	Glasgow
15:00	Candeias 16'; Stewart 32'; Mayo 53'; Ojo 70'; Defoe 89'	Report		Stadium: Ibrox Stadium; Attendance: 22,156; Referee: Nick Walsh

14 July 2019 Friendly	Rangers	4–0	Marseille	Glasgow
15:00	Candeias 17', 42'; Goldson 62'; Defoe 75'	Report		Stadium: Ibrox Stadium; Attendance: 24,259; Referee: Bobby Madden

21 July 2019 Friendly	Rangers	1–1	Blackburn Rovers	Glasgow
15:00	Defoe 30'	Report	Travis 65'	Stadium: Ibrox Stadium; Attendance: 18,627; Referee: Don Robertson

28 July 2019 Friendly	Rangers	1–0	Derby County	Glasgow
15:00	Katić 83'	Report		Stadium: Ibrox Stadium; Attendance: 19,843; Referee: Kevin Clancy

11 January 2020 Friendly	Rangers	6–1	Lokomotiv Tashkent	Dubai, United Arab Emirates
11:00 GMT	Defoe 10'; Ojo 27'; Davis 49'; Tavernier 70'; Stewart 80' (pen.), 90'	Report	Yusupov 78'	Stadium: The Sevens Stadium

=== Scottish Premiership ===
4 August 2019 1	Kilmarnock	1–2	Rangers	Kilmarnock
13:30	Power (yellow card) 15'; O'Donnell 83'; Dicker (yellow card) 90'	Rangers Report; BBC Report; SPFL Report	Arfield 16'; Tavernier (yellow card) 25'; Goldson 90+1'	Stadium: Rugby Park; Attendance: 9,196; Referee: Willie Collum

11 August 2019 2	Rangers	6–1	Hibernian	Glasgow
15:00	Defoe 9', 15', 74'; Katić (yellow card) 17'; Morelos 77', 89'; Ojo (yellow card) 12', (goal) 90+2'	Rangers Report; BBC Report; SPFL Report	McGregor (yellow card) 5'; Doidge (yellow card) 16'; Mackie (yellow card) 24' (yellow-red card) 55'; Vela (yellow card) 31'; Horgan 40'	Stadium: Ibrox Stadium; Attendance: 49,718; Referee: John Beaton

25 August 2019 3	St Mirren	0–1	Rangers	Paisley
12:15	Waters (yellow card) 58'	Rangers Report; BBC Report; SPFL Report	Barišić 59', (yellow card) 59'; Helander (yellow card) 85'	Stadium: Simple Digital Arena; Attendance: 7,332; Referee: Kevin Clancy

1 September 2019 4	Rangers	0–2	Celtic	Glasgow
12:00	Arfield (yellow card) 90'; Jones (red card) 90+6'	Rangers Report; BBC Report; SPFL Report	Édouard 32'; Hayes (yellow card) 90+1', (goal) 90+3'	Stadium: Ibrox Stadium; Attendance: 49,873; Referee: Bobby Madden

14 September 2019 5	Rangers	3–1	Livingston	Glasgow
15:00	Tavernier 55'; Morelos 71'; Barker 79'	Rangers Report; BBC Report; SPFL Report	Lawless 47' (pen.); Dykes (yellow card) 50' (yellow-red card) 73'; Crawford (yellow card) 58'	Stadium: Ibrox Stadium; Attendance: 48,793; Referee: Willie Collum

22 September 2019 6	St Johnstone	0–4	Rangers	Perth
12:15	Gordon (yellow card) 64'	Rangers Report; BBC Report; SPFL Report	Morelos 47'; Goldson 61'; Defoe 88', 90'	Stadium: McDiarmid Park; Attendance: 6,251; Referee: Andrew Dallas

28 September 2019 7	Rangers	5–0	Aberdeen	Glasgow
15:00	Tavernier 20' (pen.), 71' (pen.); Stewart 40'; Morelos 50'; Defoe 80'	Rangers Report; BBC Report; SPFL Report	McGinn (yellow card) 30'; Cosgrove (yellow card) 82'; Devlin (yellow card) 86'	Stadium: Ibrox Stadium; Attendance: 49,992; Referee: Bobby Madden

6 October 2019 8	Rangers	5–0	Hamilton Academical	Glasgow
15:00	Defoe 7', 63', 71'; Goldson 34'; Barišić 61'	Rangers Report; BBC Report; SPFL Report	Stubbs (yellow card) 60'	Stadium: Ibrox Stadium; Attendance: 48,838; Referee: Nick Walsh

20 October 2019 9	Heart of Midlothian	1–1	Rangers	Edinburgh
12:15	Meshino 6'; Whelan (yellow card) 23'; White (yellow card) 33'; MacLean (yellow card) 77'; Clare (yellow card) 82'	Rangers Report; BBC Report; SPFL Report	McGregor (yellow card) 30'; Morelos 39', (yellow card) 79'; Tavernier (yellow card) 77'; Katić (yellow card) 89'	Stadium: Tynecastle Park; Attendance: 17,573; Referee: Kevin Clancy

27 October 2019 10	Rangers	2–1	Motherwell	Glasgow
15:00	Tavernier (penalty missed) 38'; Defoe 45+1'; Helander 80'	Rangers Report; BBC Report; SPFL Report	Cole 12'; Polworth (yellow card) 42'; Gillespie (yellow card) 84'; Donnelly (yellow card) 85'	Stadium: Ibrox Stadium; Attendance: 49,629; Referee: Andrew Dallas

30 October 2019 11	Ross County	0–4	Rangers	Dingwall
19:45	Stewart (yellow card) 59'	Rangers Report; BBC Report; SPFL Report	Morelos 20', 71'; Jack 29', 37'	Stadium: Global Energy Stadium; Attendance: 6,575; Referee: Bobby Madden

10 November 2019 13	Livingston	0–2	Rangers	Livingston
15:00	McMillan (yellow card) 20'; Bartley (yellow card) 73'; Taylor-Sinclair (yellow card) 81'	Rangers Report; BBC Report; SPFL Report	Aribo 32'; Morelos 52'	Stadium: Tony Macaroni Arena; Attendance: 8,071; Referee: Nick Walsh

24 November 2019 14	Hamilton Academical	1–3	Rangers	Hamilton
12:15	Smith 14'; Oakley (yellow card) 62'; Gogić (yellow card) 64'	Rangers Report; BBC Report; SPFL Report	Jack 7'; Kent 43', 90+3'; Defoe (yellow card) 70'; Morelos (yellow card) 87'	Stadium: Fountain of Youth Stadium; Attendance: 5,100; Referee: Steven McLean

1 December 2019 15	Rangers	5–0	Heart of Midlothian	Glasgow
15:00	Morelos 11'; Helander (yellow card) 36'; Kent 37'; Aribo (yellow card) 45'; Berra 64' (o.g.); Stewart 80', 85'	Rangers Report; BBC Report; SPFL Report	Ikpeazu (yellow card) 31'; Berra (yellow card) 41'; Brandon (yellow card) 84'	Stadium: Ibrox Stadium; Attendance: 49,811; Referee: Don Robertson

4 December 2019 16	Aberdeen	2–2	Rangers	Aberdeen
19:45	Logan (yellow card) 13'; Cosgrove (yellow card) 33'; Gallagher 39'; Considine 48'	Rangers Report; BBC Report; SPFL Report	Arfield 18', (yellow card) 83'; Jack 30'; Goldson (yellow card) 66'	Stadium: Pittodrie Stadium; Attendance: 14,790; Referee: John Beaton

15 December 2019 18	Motherwell	0–2	Rangers	Motherwell
12:00	Donnelly (yellow card) 44'; Gallagher (yellow card) 45'; Long (yellow card) 83'	Rangers Report; BBC Report; SPFL Report	Katić 27'; Jack (yellow card) 45'; Morelos 69', (yellow card) 57' (yellow-red card) 71'; Tavernier (yellow card) 79'	Stadium: Fir Park; Attendance: 8,359; Referee: Don Robertson

20 December 2019 19	Hibernian	0–3	Rangers	Edinburgh
19:45	Stevenson (yellow card) 40'; Naismith (yellow card) 43'; Boyle (yellow card) 48'; Hallberg (yellow card) 51'; Porteous (red card) 60'; Horgan (yellow card) 63'	Rangers Report; BBC Report; SPFL Report	Kent 4'; Aribo 8'; Defoe 53'; Goldson (yellow card) 63'	Stadium: Easter Road; Attendance: 19,540; Referee: Nick Walsh

26 December 2019 20	Rangers	1–0	Kilmarnock	Glasgow
15:00	Morelos 65'	Rangers Report; BBC Report; SPFL Report	Wilson (yellow card) 10'; Millar (yellow card) 47'; Bruce (yellow card) 66'	Stadium: Ibrox Stadium; Attendance: 49,885; Referee: Steven McLean

29 December 2019 21	Celtic	1–2	Rangers	Glasgow
12:30	Christie (penalty missed) 33', (yellow card) 49'; Brown (yellow card) 38'; Édouard 42'; Bolingoli (yellow card) 71'	Rangers Report; BBC Report; SPFL Report	Kent 36'; Katić (yellow card) 33', (goal) 56'; Kamara (yellow card) 70'; Barišić (yellow card) 82'; Morelos (yellow card) 85' (yellow-red card) 90+6'	Stadium: Celtic Park; Attendance: 58,902; Referee: Kevin Clancy

22 January 2020 22	Rangers	1–0	St Mirren	Glasgow
19:45	Defoe 34'; Flanagan (yellow card) 59'; Kamara (yellow card) 68'	Rangers Report; BBC Report; SPFL Report	Waters (yellow card) 81'; McCarthy (yellow card) 90+1'	Stadium: Ibrox Stadium; Attendance: 49,297; Referee: Nick Walsh

26 January 2020 23	Heart of Midlothian	2–1	Rangers	Edinburgh
15:00	Naismith 57'; Henderson (yellow card) 68'; Boyce 83'	Rangers Report; BBC Report; SPFL Report	Flanagan (yellow card) 28'; Jack (yellow card) 42'; Kent 47'	Stadium: Tynecastle Park; Attendance: 18,539; Referee: Steven McLean

29 January 2020 17	Rangers	2–0	Ross County	Glasgow
19:45	Defoe 41'; Arfield 47'; Goldson (yellow card) 52'; Polster (yellow card) 67'	Rangers Report; BBC Report; SPFL Report	Mullin (yellow card) 45'; Spence (yellow card) 74'; Kelly (yellow card) 76'; Fraser (yellow card) 86'	Stadium: Ibrox Stadium; Attendance: 47,583; Referee: Don Robertson

1 February 2020 24	Rangers	0–0	Aberdeen	Glasgow
15:00	Barišić (yellow card) 16'; Goldson (yellow card) 61'; Arfield (yellow card) 68'	Rangers Report; BBC Report; SPFL Report	Ferguson (yellow card) 26'; McGeouch (yellow card) 56'; McKenna (yellow card) 72'; Lewis (yellow card) 76'	Stadium: Ibrox Stadium; Attendance: 50,012; Referee: Andrew Dallas

5 February 2020 25	Rangers	2–1	Hibernian	Glasgow
19:45	Edmundson (yellow card) 35', (goal) 45+2'; Hagi 84'	Rangers Report; BBC Report; SPFL Report	Hanlon 35'; Doidge (yellow card) 42'; Stevenson (yellow card) 90+2'	Stadium: Ibrox Stadium; Attendance: 49,427; Referee: Bobby Madden

12 February 2020 26	Kilmarnock	2–1	Rangers	Kilmarnock
19:45	Dicker (yellow card) 16'; Power (yellow card) 44'; O'Donnell 77'; Kabamba (yellow card) 87'; Brophy 88'	Rangers Report; BBC Report; SPFL Report	Arfield 32'; Kent (yellow card) 44'; Morelos (yellow card) 57'; McGregor (yellow card) 90+5'	Stadium: Rugby Park; Attendance: 8,096; Referee: John Beaton

16 February 2020 27	Rangers	1–0	Livingston	Glasgow
15:00	Arfield 59'	Rangers Report; BBC Report; SPFL Report	Lawson (yellow card) 34'; Guthrie (yellow card) 43'; Crawford (yellow card) 68'	Stadium: Ibrox Stadium; Attendance: 48,302; Referee: Euan Anderson

23 February 2020 28	St Johnstone	2–2	Rangers	Perth
13:30	Hendry 8'; Booth (yellow card) 63'; May 80'	Rangers Report; BBC Report; SPFL Report	Kamberi 53'; Aribo 71'	Stadium: McDiarmid Park; Attendance: 8,286; Referee: Willie Collum

4 March 2020 29	Rangers	0–1	Hamilton Academical	Glasgow
19:45	McGregor (yellow card) 79'	Rangers Report; BBC Report; SPFL Report	Want (yellow card) 53'; Moyo 56'	Stadium: Ibrox Stadium; Attendance: 48,167; Referee: Nick Walsh

8 March 2020 30	Ross County	0−1	Rangers	Dingwall
12:00	Fontaine (yellow card) 12'; Stewart (yellow card) 56'; Spittal (yellow card) 90+1'; Morris (yellow card) 90+5'	Rangers Report; BBC Report; SPFL Report	Kent 77'	Stadium: Global Energy Stadium; Attendance: 6,400; Referee: Andrew Dallas

=== Scottish League Cup ===
18 August 2019 Second round	East Fife	0–3	Rangers	Methil
15:00	Higgins (yellow card) 29'; Dunlop (yellow card) 55'	Report	Defoe 26'; Dunlop 56' (o.g.); Aribo 84'	Stadium: Bayview Stadium; Attendance: 1,991; Referee: Don Robertson

25 September 2019 Quarter final	Livingston	0–1	Rangers	Livingston
19:45	Dykes (yellow card) 35'; Souda (yellow card) 66'; Lawless (yellow card) 90'; Jacobs (yellow card) 90+1'	Report	Kamara 5' (yellow card) 45'; Goldson (yellow card) 40'	Stadium: Tony Macaroni Arena; Attendance: 8,160; Referee: Don Robertson

3 November 2019 Semi final	Rangers	3–0	Heart of Midlothian	Glasgow
15:00	Helander 45+1'; Morelos 47', 62'; Jack (yellow card) 68'; Defoe (yellow card) 87'	Report	MacLean (yellow card) 23'; Clare (yellow card) 36'; Naismith (yellow card) 68'; Wighton (yellow card) 71'	Stadium: Hampden Park; Attendance: 49,310; Referee: John Beaton

8 December 2019 Final	Rangers	0–1	Celtic	Glasgow
15:00	Kamara (yellow card) 41'; Morelos (penalty missed) 64'; Arfield (yellow card) 65'; Aribo (yellow card) 71'	Report	Jullien 60'; Frimpong (red card) 63'; Ajer (yellow card) 65'; McGregor (yellow card) 77'	Stadium: Hampden Park; Attendance: 51,117; Referee: Willie Collum

=== Scottish Cup ===
17 January 2020 Fourth round	Rangers	2–0	Stranraer	Glasgow
19:45	Arfield 44'; Patterson (yellow card) 47'; Defoe 66' (pen.)	Report	Hamill (yellow card) 40'; Cummins (yellow card) 66'	Stadium: Ibrox Stadium; Attendance: 38,560; Referee: John Beaton

8 February 2020 Fifth round	Hamilton Academical	1–4	Rangers	Hamilton
12:31	Winter (yellow card) 19'; Smith 38'; Gogić (yellow card) 53'	Report	Arfield (penalty missed) 25', 25', 90+2'; Aribo 68'; Halliday (yellow card) 78'; Morelos 85'	Stadium: Fountain of Youth Stadium; Attendance: 4,050; Referee: Alan Muir

29 February 2020 Quarter final	Heart of Midlothian	1–0	Rangers	Edinburgh
17:30	Damour (yellow card) 38'; Bozanic 58'; Clare (yellow card) 81'	Report	Jack (yellow card) 25'; Stewart (yellow card) 66'; Kent (yellow card) 90'	Stadium: Tynecastle Park; Attendance: 11,428; Referee: Steven McLean

=== Europa League ===
Rangers qualified for the first qualifying round after finishing in second place in the 2018–19 Scottish Premiership.

==== Qualification stage ====
9 July 2019 1QR 1st leg	St Joseph's (Gibraltar)	0–4	(Scotland) Rangers	Gibraltar
16:55 BST	Pecci (yellow card) 45+2'; Guerrero (yellow card) 47'; Boro (yellow card) 59'	Report	Defoe (yellow card) 25'; Jack 49'; Ojo 56', (yellow card) 89'; Goldson 68'; Morelos 76'	Stadium: Victoria Stadium; Attendance: 2,050; Referee: Nejc Kajtazovič (Slovenia)

18 July 2019 1QR 2nd leg	Rangers (Scotland)	6–0 (10–0 agg.)	(Gibraltar) St Joseph's	Glasgow, Scotland
19:45 BST	Aribo 3'; Morelos 45+1', 57' (pen.), 66'; Defoe 77', 86'; Goldson (yellow card) 90+3'	Report	Torres (yellow card) 31'; Boro (yellow card) 90+3'	Stadium: Ibrox Stadium; Attendance: 45,718; Referee: Christopher Jäger (Austria)

25 July 2019 2QR 1st leg	Rangers (Scotland)	2–0	(Luxembourg) Progrès Niederkorn	Glasgow, Scotland
19:45 BST	Aribo 20', (yellow card) 71'; Ojo 54'; Tavernier (penalty missed) 70'	Report	Laterza (yellow card) 12' (yellow-red card) 88'	Stadium: Ibrox Stadium; Attendance: 43,629; Referee: Espen Eskås (Norway)

1 August 2019 2QR 2nd leg	Progrès Niederkorn (Luxembourg)	0–0 (0–2 agg.)	(Scotland) Rangers	Luxembourg City, Luxembourg
18:30 BST	Thill (yellow card) 49'	Report	Barišić (yellow card) 9'; Arfield (yellow card) 62'	Stadium: Stade Josy Barthel (Note: Progrès Niederkorn play their home matches at Stade Josy Barthel, Luxembourg City, instead of their regular stadium Stade Jos Haupert, Niederkorn which does not meet UEFA requirements.); Attendance: 3,867; Referee: Ivaylo Stoyanov (Bulgaria)

8 August 2019 3QR 1st leg	Midtjylland (Denmark)	2–4	(Scotland) Rangers	Herning, Denmark
19:00 BST	Nicolaisen (yellow card) 49'; Onyeka 58'; Kaba 63'; Evander (yellow card) 80'	Report	Morelos 43', (yellow card) 88'; Aribo 52', (yellow card) 89'; Katić 56'; Arfield 70'; Jack (yellow card) 80'; Flanagan (yellow card) 88'	Stadium: MCH Arena; Attendance: 9,322; Referee: Kristo Tohver (Estonia)

15 August 2019 3QR 2nd leg	Rangers (Scotland)	3–1 (7–3 agg.)	(Denmark) Midtjylland	Glasgow, Scotland
19:45 BST	Morelos 14', 49'; Tavernier (yellow card) 33'; Ojo 39'; Kamara (yellow card) 79'	Report	Nicolaisen (yellow card) 45'; Scholz (yellow card) 51'; Mabil (yellow card) 65'; Evander 72'; Kaba (yellow card) 76'	Stadium: Ibrox Stadium; Attendance: 47,184; Referee: Marco Di Bello (Italy)

22 August 2019 PO 1st leg	Legia Warsaw (Poland)	0–0	(Scotland) Rangers	Warsaw, Poland
19:00 BST	Martins (yellow card) 24'; Jędrzejczyk (yellow card) 39'; Stolarski (yellow card) 51'; Vešović (yellow card) 64'	Report	Flanagan (yellow card) 61'; Morelos (yellow card) 72'	Stadium: Polish Army Stadium; Attendance: 26,665; Referee: Benoît Bastien (France)

29 August 2019 PO 2nd leg	Rangers (Scotland)	1–0 (1–0 agg.)	(Poland) Legia Warsaw	Glasgow, Scotland
19:45 BST	Barišić (yellow card) 60'; Tavernier (yellow card) 70'; Katić (yellow card) 80'; Morelos 90+1'; Jones (yellow card) 90+4'; Kamara (yellow card) 90+8'	Report	Stolarski (yellow card) 38'; Lewczuk (yellow card) 90+4'; Vešović (yellow card) 90+8'	Stadium: Ibrox Stadium; Attendance: 45,463; Referee: Slavko Vinčić (Slovenia)

==== Group stage ====
Pos	Team	Pld	W	D	L	GF	GA	GD	Pts	Qualification	POR	RAN	YB	FEY
1	(Portugal) Porto	6	3	1	2	8	9	−1	10	Advance to knockout phase	—	1–1	2–1	3–2
2	(Scotland) Rangers	6	2	3	1	8	6	+2	9	Advance to knockout phase	2–0	—	1–1	1–0
3	(Switzerland) Young Boys	6	2	2	2	8	7	+1	8		1–2	2–1	—	2–0
4	(Netherlands) Feyenoord	6	1	2	3	7	9	−2	5		2–0	2–2	1–1	—

Source: UEFA

19 September 2019 1	Rangers (Scotland)	1–0	(Netherlands) Feyenoord	Glasgow, Scotland
20:00 BST	Tavernier (penalty missed) 10'; Ojo 23'; Morelos (yellow card) 34'; Helander (yellow card) 57'; Kamara (yellow card) 80'; Goldson (yellow card) 90+3'	Report	Fer (yellow card) 39'; Tapia (yellow card) 41'; Haps (yellow card) 55'	Stadium: Ibrox Stadium; Attendance: 46,858; Referee: Antonio Mateu Lahoz (Spain)

3 October 2019 2	Young Boys (Switzerland)	2–1	(Scotland) Rangers	Bern, Switzerland
17:55 BST	Assalé 50'; Sørensen (yellow card) 52'; Zesiger (yellow card) 87'; Fassnacht 90+3'	Report	Morelos 44', (yellow card) 89'; Tavernier (yellow card) 90+1'; Davis (yellow card) 90+1'	Stadium: Stade de Suisse; Attendance: 26,348; Referee: Manuel Schüttengruber (Austria)

24 October 2019 3	Porto (Portugal)	1–1	(Scotland) Rangers	Porto, Portugal
17:55 BST	Díaz 36'; Costa (yellow card) 69'; Telles (yellow card) 76'; Pepe (yellow card) 82'	Report	Barišić (yellow card) 14'; Jack (yellow card) 29'; Morelos 44'; Helander (yellow card) 78'	Stadium: Estádio do Dragão; Attendance: 31,307; Referee: Nikola Dabanović (Montenegro)

7 November 2019 4	Rangers (Scotland)	2−0	(Portugal) Porto	Glasgow, Scotland
20:00 GMT	Barišić (yellow card) 31'; Morelos 69'; Davis 73'	Report	Danilo (yellow card) 37'; Otávio (yellow card) 39'; Díaz (yellow card) 90+3'	Stadium: Ibrox Stadium; Attendance: 49,645; Referee: Davide Massa (Italy)

28 November 2019 5	Feyenoord (Netherlands)	2–2	(Scotland) Rangers	Rotterdam, Netherlands
17:55 GMT	Toornstra 33'; Sinisterra 68'	Report	Kamara (yellow card) 16'; Morelos 52', 65'; Jack (yellow card) 70'	Stadium: De Kuip; Attendance: 47,500; Referee: Damir Skomina (Slovenia)

12 December 2019 6	Rangers (Scotland)	1–1	(Switzerland) Young Boys	Glasgow, Scotland
20:00 GMT	Morelos 30'; Jack (yellow card) 62' (yellow-red card) 90+3'	Report	Assalé (yellow card) 86'; Barišić 89' (o.g.)	Stadium: Ibrox Stadium; Attendance: 49,015; Referee: Felix Brych (Germany)

==== Knockout stage ====
20 February 2020 R32 1st leg	Rangers (Scotland)	3–2	(Portugal) Braga	Glasgow, Scotland
20:00 GMT	Morelos (yellow card) 41'; Aribo (yellow card) 58' (goal) 75'; Hagi 67', 82'	Report	Fransérgio 11'; Ruiz 59'; Galeno (yellow card) 69'; Silva (yellow card) 90+5'	Stadium: Ibrox Stadium; Attendance: 49,378; Referee: Xavier Estrada Fernández (Spain)

26 February 2020 R32 2nd leg	Braga (Portugal)	0–1 (2–4 agg.)	(Scotland) Rangers	Braga, Portugal
17:00 GMT	Carmo (yellow card) 47'; Esgaio (yellow card) 89'; Ruiz (yellow card) 90+4'	Report	Hagi (penalty missed) 45+1'; Kent 61'; Kamberi (yellow card) 73'	Stadium: Estádio Municipal de Braga; Attendance: 18,113; Referee: Andreas Ekberg (Sweden)

12 March 2020 Round of 16 1st leg	Rangers (Scotland)	1–3	(Germany) Bayer Leverkusen	Glasgow, Scotland
20:00 GMT	Kamara (yellow card) 20'; Arfield (yellow card) 73'; Edmundson 75'; Kent (yellow card) 79'	Report	Demirbay (yellow card) 29'; Havertz 37' (pen.); Aránguiz 67'; Wendell (yellow card) 77'; Weiser (yellow card) 81'; Diaby (yellow card) 86'; Bailey 88'	Stadium: Ibrox Stadium; Attendance: 47,494; Referee: Szymon Marciniak (Poland)

6 August 2020 Round of 16 2nd leg	Bayer Leverkusen (Germany)	1–0 (4–1 agg.)	(Scotland) Rangers	Leverkusen, Germany
17:55 BST	Aránguiz (yellow card) 14'; Sinkgraven (yellow card) 45+2'; Diaby 51'; Tah (yellow card) 90'	Report	Barker (yellow card) 53'; Hagi (yellow card) 67'	Stadium: Bayarena; Attendance: 0 Referee: Danny Makkelie (Netherlands)

== Club ==
=== Technical Staff ===
Name	Role
Manager	(England) Steven Gerrard
Assistant Manager	(Scotland) Gary McAllister
First Team Coach	(England) Michael Beale
Technical Coach	(England) Tom Culshaw
Goalkeeping Coach	(Scotland) Colin Stewart
Head of Scouting	(England) Andy Scoulding
Club Scouts	(Scotland) John Brown (Scotland) Billy McLaren (England) David Swanick
Scouting Coordinator	(England) Rob Clarkson
Doctor	(England) Dr Mark Waller
Head of Performance	(England) Jordan Milsom
Head of Preparation	(Scotland) Craig Flannigan
Head of Strength and Conditioning	(Greece) Paraskevas Polychronopoulos
Physiotherapist	(England) Steve Walker
Masseur	(Scotland) David Lavery
Kit Executive	(Scotland) Jimmy Bell

=== Kit ===
Supplier: Hummel / Sponsors: 32Red (front) and Utilita (back)

The kits were produced with manufacturer Hummell and was the second year in a three year deal.

Home	Away	Third	Blackout

- Home: The home shirt is blue with a subtle striped jacquard pattern on the front and the famous Hummel chevrons running down both sleeves in white. The line “We will follow Rangers” from the fan song and club anthem ‘Follow, Follow’ is printed inside the jersey.
- Away: The away kit departs from the club’s usual alternate white or red in favor of a midnight blue look. The modern v-neck kit is accented with sky blue and white on its sleeve cuffs and inside neckline. A series of light blue vertical lines run on along the lower front of the shirt. The line “Everywhere, Anywhere” from the fan song and club anthem ‘Follow, Follow’ is printed inside the jersey.
- Third: The thidd kit features a simplistic design in red and white. The line “We Will Follow On” from the fan song and club anthem ‘Follow, Follow’ is printed inside the jersey.
- Blackout The Blackout shirt has the same design as the home jersey but sees the shirt itself, the Hummel logo, the club crest and the 32Red shirt sponsor also coloured black.

== Squad statistics ==
The table below includes all players registered with the SPFL as part of the Rangers squad for 2019–20 season. They may not have made an appearance.

=== Appearances, goals and discipline ===
No.	Pos.	Nat.	Name	Totals		Scottish Premiership		Scottish Cup		League Cup		Europa League		Discipline	
No.	Pos.	Nat.	Name	Apps	Goals	Apps	Goals	Apps	Goals	Apps	Goals	Apps	Goals	Yellow card	Red card
Goalkeepers
1	GK	(Scotland) SCO	Allan McGregor	49	0	27	0	2	0	3	0	17	0	3	0
13	GK	(England) ENG	Wes Foderingham	5	0	2	0	1	0	1	0	1	0	0	0
26	GK	(England) ENG	Andy Firth	0	0	0	0	0	0	0	0	0	0	0	0
Defenders
2	DF	(England) ENG	James Tavernier (captain)	46	3	24	3	2	0	3	0	17	0	6	0
4	DF	(England) ENG	George Edmundson	15	2	4+3	1	3	0	1	0	4	1	1	0
5	DF	(Sweden) SWE	Filip Helander	18	2	8	1	0	0	4	1	6	0	4	0
6	DF	(England) ENG	Connor Goldson	52	4	29	3	2	0	3	0	18	1	7	0
15	DF	(England) ENG	Jon Flanagan	9	0	5	0	0	0	0	0	3+1	0	4	0
19	DF	(Bosnia and Herzegovina) BIH	Nikola Katić	29	3	17+2	2	1	0	0+1	0	8	1	4	0
25	DF	(United States) USA	Matt Polster	9	0	3+3	0	0	0	1	0	1+1	0	1	0
31	DF	(Croatia) CRO	Borna Barišić	40	2	22	2	2	0	3	0	13	0	7	0
63	DF	(Scotland) SCO	Nathan Patterson	2	0	0	0	1	0	0	0	0+1	0	1	0
Midfielders
7	MF	(Romania) ROU	Ianis Hagi	13	3	6+1	1	1+1	0	0	0	2+2	2	1	0
8	MF	(Scotland) SCO	Ryan Jack	39	5	19	4	2	0	3	0	15	1	8	1
10	MF	(Northern Ireland) NIR	Steven Davis	43	1	20+4	0	2+1	0	1+1	0	14	1	1	0
11	MF	(England) ENG	Sheyi Ojo	36	5	9+10	1	0+2	0	2	0	9+4	4	2	0
14	MF	(England) ENG	Ryan Kent	33	8	18+3	7	2	0	2	0	8	1	3	0
16	MF	(Scotland) SCO	Andy Halliday	12	0	4+2	0	1+1	0	1	0	2+1	0	1	0
17	MF	(Nigeria) NGA	Joe Aribo	49	9	25+2	3	3	1	3+1	1	9+6	4	5	0
18	MF	(Finland) FIN	Glen Kamara	39	1	18+1	0	1	0	4	1	12+3	0	9	0
21	MF	(England) ENG	Brandon Barker	13	1	2+4	1	0+1	0	0+2	0	3+1	0	1	0
22	MF	(Northern Ireland) NIR	Jordan Jones	15	0	2+5	0	1	0	1	0	2+4	0	1	1
37	MF	(Canada) CAN	Scott Arfield	49	9	22+4	5	3	3	2+1	0	12+5	1	6	0
70	MF	(Scotland) SCO	Kai Kennedy	1	0	0	0	0+1	0	0	0	0	0	0	0
Forwards
9	FW	(England) ENG	Jermain Defoe	32	17	11+9	13	1+1	1	1+2	1	2+5	2	3	0
20	FW	(Colombia) COL	Alfredo Morelos	47	29	18+8	12	1	1	3	2	15+2	14	10	2
23	FW	(Switzerland) SUI	Florian Kamberi	9	1	1+5	1	0	0	0	0	1+2	0	1	0
24	FW	(Scotland) SCO	Greg Stewart	25	3	3+13	3	1+1	0	1	0	1+5	0	1	0
32	FW	(Scotland) SCO	Jake Hastie	2	0	0	0	0	0	0+1	0	1	0	0	0
64	FW	(Scotland) SCO	Josh McPake	1	0	0	0	0	0	0	0	0+1	0	0	0
Players transferred or loaned out during the season who made an appearance
7	FW	(Scotland) SCO	Jamie Murphy	2	0	0+2	0	0	0	0	0	0	0	0	0
23	MF	(Scotland) SCO	Greg Docherty	5	0	0	0	0	0	1	0	1+3	0	0	0
29	MF	(Wales) WAL	Andy King	5	0	0+2	0	0	0	0+2	0	0+1	0	0	0

Appearances (starts and substitute appearances) and goals include those in Scottish Premiership, League Cup, Scottish Cup, and the UEFA Europa League.

== Club statistics ==
=== Competition overview ===
Competition	First match	Last match	Starting round	Final position	Record							
Competition	First match	Last match	Starting round	Final position	Pld	W	D	L	GF	GA	GD	Win %
Europa League	9 July 2019	6 August 2020	1st Qualifying Round	Round of 16	18	10	5	3	33	15	+18	55.56
Premiership	4 August 2019	8 March 2020	Matchday 1	2nd	29	21	4	4	64	19	+45	72.41
League Cup	18 August 2019	8 December 2019	2nd Round	Runners–up	4	3	0	1	7	1	+6	75.00
Scottish Cup	17 January 2020	29 February 2020	4th Round	Quarter-finals	3	2	0	1	7	2	+5	66.67
Total					54	36	9	9	111	37	+74	66.67

Source: Competitions

=== League table ===
Pos	Team	Pld	W	D	L	GF	GA	GD	Pts	PPG	Qualification or relegation (Note: All play-off matches were cancelled, as clubs voted to curtail the season due to the COVID-19 pandemic.)
1	Celtic (C)	30	26	2	2	89	19	+70	80	2.67	Qualification for the Champions League first qualifying round
2	Rangers	29	21	4	4	64	19	+45	67	2.31	Qualification for the Europa League second qualifying round (Note: Since the 2019–20 Scottish Cup was postponed and could not be completed by the UEFA registration deadline of 3 August 2020, the spot awarded to the Scottish Cup winners (Europa League second qualifying round) was passed to the second-placed team, while the fourth-placed team also qualified for European competition.)
3	Motherwell	30	14	4	12	41	38	+3	46	1.53	Qualification for the Europa League first qualifying round
4	Aberdeen	30	12	9	9	40	36	+4	45	1.50	Qualification for the Europa League first qualifying round
5	Livingston	30	10	9	11	41	39	+2	39	1.30	

Source: BBC SPFL
Rules for classification: 1) Points per game; 2) Goal difference; 3) Goals scored; 4) Head-to-head points; 5) Head-to-Head goal difference; 6) Play-off (only if deciding champion, UEFA competitions qualification, second stage group allocation or relegation).
(C) Champions

=== Results by round ===
Round	1	2	3	4	5	6	7	8	9	10	11	12	13	14	15	16	17	18	19	20	21	22	23	24	25	26	27	28	29
Ground	A	H	A	H	H	A	H	H	A	H	A	A	A	H	A	A	A	H	A	H	A	H	H	H	A	H	A	H	A
Result	W	W	W	L	W	W	W	W	D	W	W	W	W	W	D	W	W	W	W	W	L	W	D	W	L	W	D	L	W
Position	4	2	2	2	2	2	2	1	2	2	2	2	2	2	2	2	2	2	2	2	2	2	2	2	2	2	2	2	2

A = Away; H = Home; W = Win; D = Draw; L = Loss

== Transfers ==
=== Players in ===
Date	Player	From	Fee
1 July 2019	(Scotland) Jake Hastie	(Scotland) Motherwell	£350,000
1 July 2019	(Northern Ireland) Jordan Jones	(Scotland) Kilmarnock	Free
1 July 2019	(Northern Ireland) Steven Davis	(England) Southampton	Free
1 July 2019	(Scotland) Greg Stewart	(England) Birmingham City	Free
1 July 2019	(England) George Edmundson	(England) Oldham Athletic	Undisclosed
1 July 2019	(Nigeria) Joe Aribo	(England) Charlton Athletic	Undisclosed
13 July 2019	(Sweden) Filip Helander	(Italy) Bologna	£3,500,000
9 August 2019	(England) Brandon Barker	(England) Manchester City	Undisclosed
2 September 2019	(England) Ryan Kent	(England) Liverpool	£6,500,000

=== Players out ===
Date	Player	To	Fee
1 July 2019	(Scotland) Kyle Bradley	(Scotland) Annan Athletic	Free
1 July 2019	(Malta) Myles Beerman	(Malta) Hibernians	Free
1 July 2019	(Scotland) Liam Burt	(Scotland) Celtic	Free
1 July 2019	(Northern Ireland) Gareth McAuley	Retired	N/A
1 July 2019	(Northern Ireland) Lee Hodson	(England) Gillingham	Free
1 July 2019	(Scotland) Lee Wallace	(England) Queens Park Rangers	Free
17 July 2019	(Scotland) Ryan Hardie	(England) Blackpool	Undisclosed
22 July 2019	(Portugal) Daniel Candeias	(Turkey) Gençlerbirliği	Undisclosed
24 July 2019	(Northern Ireland) Kyle Lafferty	(Norway) Sarpsborg 08	Free
29 July 2019	(Scotland) Andrew Dallas	(England) Cambridge United	Undisclosed
2 September 2019	(Scotland) Graham Dorrans	(Scotland) Dundee	Free
2 September 2019	(Ghana) Joe Dodoo	(England) Bolton Wanderers	Free
30 December 2019	(Finland) Serge Atakayi	(Finland) SJK	Undisclosed
7 January 2020	(Albania) Eros Grezda	(Croatia) Osijek	Undisclosed
15 January 2020	(Scotland) Zak Rudden	(Scotland) Partick Thistle	Undisclosed
23 January 2020	(Scotland) Jordan Houston	(Scotland) Ayr United	Undisclosed
27 January 2020	(Mexico) Eduardo Herrera	(Mexico) Puebla	Undisclosed

=== Loans in ===
Start date	End date	Player	From	Fee
1 July 2019	30 June 2020	(England) Sheyi Ojo	(England) Liverpool	Loan
15 August 2019	31 December 2019	(Wales) Andy King	(England) Leicester City	Loan
31 January 2020	30 June 2020	(Romania) Ianis Hagi	(Belgium) Genk	Loan
31 January 2020	30 June 2020	(Albania) Florian Kamberi	(Scotland) Hibernian	Loan

=== Loans out ===
Start date	End date	Player	To	Fee
4 July 2019	21 January 2020	(Scotland) Robby McCrorie	(Scotland) Queen of the South	Loan
5 July 2019	30 June 2020	(Scotland) Ross McCrorie	(England) Portsmouth	Loan
8 July 2019	30 June 2020	(England) Jordan Rossiter	(England) Fleetwood Town	Loan
10 July 2019	30 June 2020	(Scotland) Stephen Kelly	(Scotland) Ayr United	Loan
10 July 2019	7 January 2020	(Northern Ireland) Cammy Palmer	(Scotland) Partick Thistle	Loan
15 July 2019	31 December 2019	(Mexico) Eduardo Herrera	(Mexico) Necaxa	Loan
15 July 2019	31 December 2019	(Scotland) Matthew Shiels	(Scotland) Dumbarton	Loan
23 July 2019	30 June 2020	(England) Jak Alnwick	(England) Blackpool	Loan
25 July 2019	31 December 2019	(Scotland) Brian Kinnear	(Scotland) Camelon Juniors	Loan
25 July 2019	8 January 2020	(Scotland) Nicky Hogarth	(Scotland) Caledonian Braves	Loan
9 August 2019	14 January 2020	(Scotland) Aidan McAdams	(Scotland) Edinburgh City	Loan
13 August 2019	27 December 2019	(Scotland) Glenn Middleton	(Scotland) Hibernian	Loan
20 August 2019	14 January 2020	(Scotland) Josh McPake	(Scotland) Dundee	Loan
23 August 2019	14 January 2020	(Scotland) Zak Rudden	(England) Plymouth Argyle	Loan
30 August 2019	23 January 2020	(Scotland) Jordan Houston	(Scotland) Ayr United	Loan
2 September 2019	28 January 2020	(Scotland) Jake Hastie	(England) Rotherham United	Loan
2 September 2019	30 June 2020	(Scotland) Jason Holt	(Scotland) St Johnstone	Loan
17 September 2019	17 January 2020	(Portugal) Joaõ Baldé	(Scotland) Berwick Rangers	Loan
25 September 2019	30 June 2020	(Scotland) Aidan Wilson	(Scotland) Edinburgh City	Loan
9 January 2020	30 June 2020	(Scotland) Nicky Hogarth	(Scotland) Stirling Albion	Loan
16 January 2020	30 June 2020	(Scotland) Aidan McAdams	(Northern Ireland) Portadown	Loan
20 January 2020	30 June 2020	(Scotland) Jamie Barjonas	(Scotland) Partick Thistle	Loan
20 January 2020	30 June 2020	(Scotland) Jamie Murphy	(England) Burton Albion	Loan
21 January 2020	30 June 2020	(Scotland) Robby McCrorie	(Scotland) Livingston	Loan
30 January 2020	30 June 2020	(Scotland) Kieran Wright	(Scotland) Alloa Athletic	Loan
31 January 2020	30 June 2020	(Scotland) Lewis Mayo	(Scotland) Partick Thistle	Loan
31 January 2020	30 June 2020	(Scotland) Greg Docherty	(Scotland) Hibernian	Loan
31 January 2020	30 June 2020	(Scotland) Glenn Middleton	(England) Bradford City	Loan
3 February 2020	30 November 2020	(Northern Ireland) Daniel Finlayson	(United States) Orange County SC	Loan
3 February 2020	30 November 2020	(Northern Ireland) Cammy Palmer	(United States) Orange County SC	Loan
3 February 2020	30 November 2020	(Scotland) Matthew Shiels	(United States) Orange County SC	Loan

== See also ==
- List of Rangers F.C. seasons
