= Aidan McAdams =

Scottish footballer

Personal information
- Date of birth: 23 March 1999 (age 27)
- Place of birth: Glasgow, Scotland
- Height: 6 ft 3 in (1.90 m)
- Position: Goalkeeper

Team information
- Current team: Arbroath
- Number: 1

Youth career
- –2017: Celtic
- 2017–2019: Rangers

Senior career*
| Years | Team | Apps | (Gls) |
| 2019–2020 | Rangers | 0 | (0) |
| 2019 | → Annan Athletic (loan) | 3 | (0) |
| 2019–2020 | → Edinburgh City (loan) | 10 | (0) |
| 2020 | → Portadown (loan) | 0 | (0) |
| 2020–2021 | Greenock Morton | 27 | (0) |
| 2021–2023 | Ayr United | 27 | (0) |
| 2023 | Edinburgh City | 9 | (0) |
| 2024 | Larne | 1 | (0) |
| 2024– | Arbroath | 70 | (0) |

International career
| 2013–2014 | Scotland U15 | 4 | (0) |
| 2014 | Scotland U16 | 3 | (0) |
| 2015–2016 | Scotland U17 | 9 | (0) |
| 2017–2018 | Scotland U19 | 5 | (0) |
- * Club domestic league appearances and goals as of 4 May 2026

Aidan McAdams (born 23 March 1999) is a Scottish footballer who plays as a goalkeeper for Scottish Championship club Arbroath.

== Club career ==
McAdams was born in Glasgow. Having been at Celtic's academy from the age of 8, he switched to Rangers in 2017 on a three-year contract.

He joined Annan Athletic on loan in January 2019, and made his debut for them on 2 March 2019 in a 2–1 victory over Queen's Park. He appeared in three matches for Annan Athletic.

In August 2019, McAdams joined Edinburgh City on loan until January 2020, going on to play 12 times for the club. He joined Northern Irish side Portadown on loan in January 2020. He was released by Rangers at the end of the season.

McAdams joined Greenock Morton in September 2020 on a season-long deal.

He moved to Ayr United in June 2021.

McAdams would have brief stints with Edinburgh City and Northern Irish side Larne, winning the NIFL Premiership while with the latter.

On 13 July 2024, McAdams signed for Scottish League One club Arbroath on a one-year deal.

== International career ==
He has represented Scotland at under-15, under-16, under-17 and under-19 levels.

== Honours ==
Larne

NIFL Premiership: 2023-24

== Career statistics ==
As of 17 April 2021

Appearances and goals by club, season and competition
| Club | Season | League | | | National Cup | | League Cup | | Other | | Total | |
| Club | Season | Division | Apps | Goals | Apps | Goals | Apps | Goals | Apps | Goals | Apps | Goals |
|---|---|---|---|---|---|---|---|---|---|---|---|---|
| Rangers | 2018–19 | Scottish Premiership | 0 | 0 | 0 | 0 | 0 | 0 | 0 | 0 | 0 | 0 |
| Rangers | 2019–20 | Scottish Premiership | 0 | 0 | 0 | 0 | 0 | 0 | 0 | 0 | 0 | 0 |
| Rangers | Total | | 0 | 0 | 0 | 0 | 0 | 0 | 0 | 0 | 0 | 0 |
| Annan Athletic (loan) | 2018–19 | Scottish League Two | 3 | 0 | 0 | 0 | 0 | 0 | 0 | 0 | 3 | 0 |
| Edinburgh City (loan) | 2019–20 | Scottish League Two | 10 | 0 | 2 | 0 | 0 | 0 | 0 | 0 | 12 | 0 |
| Greenock Morton | 2020–21 | Scottish Championship | 24 | 0 | 3 | 0 | 4 | 0 | 0 | 0 | 31 | 0 |
| Career total | | | 37 | 0 | 5 | 0 | 4 | 0 | 0 | 0 | 46 | 0 |
