= 2018–19 Rangers F.C. season =

Rangers
2018–19 season
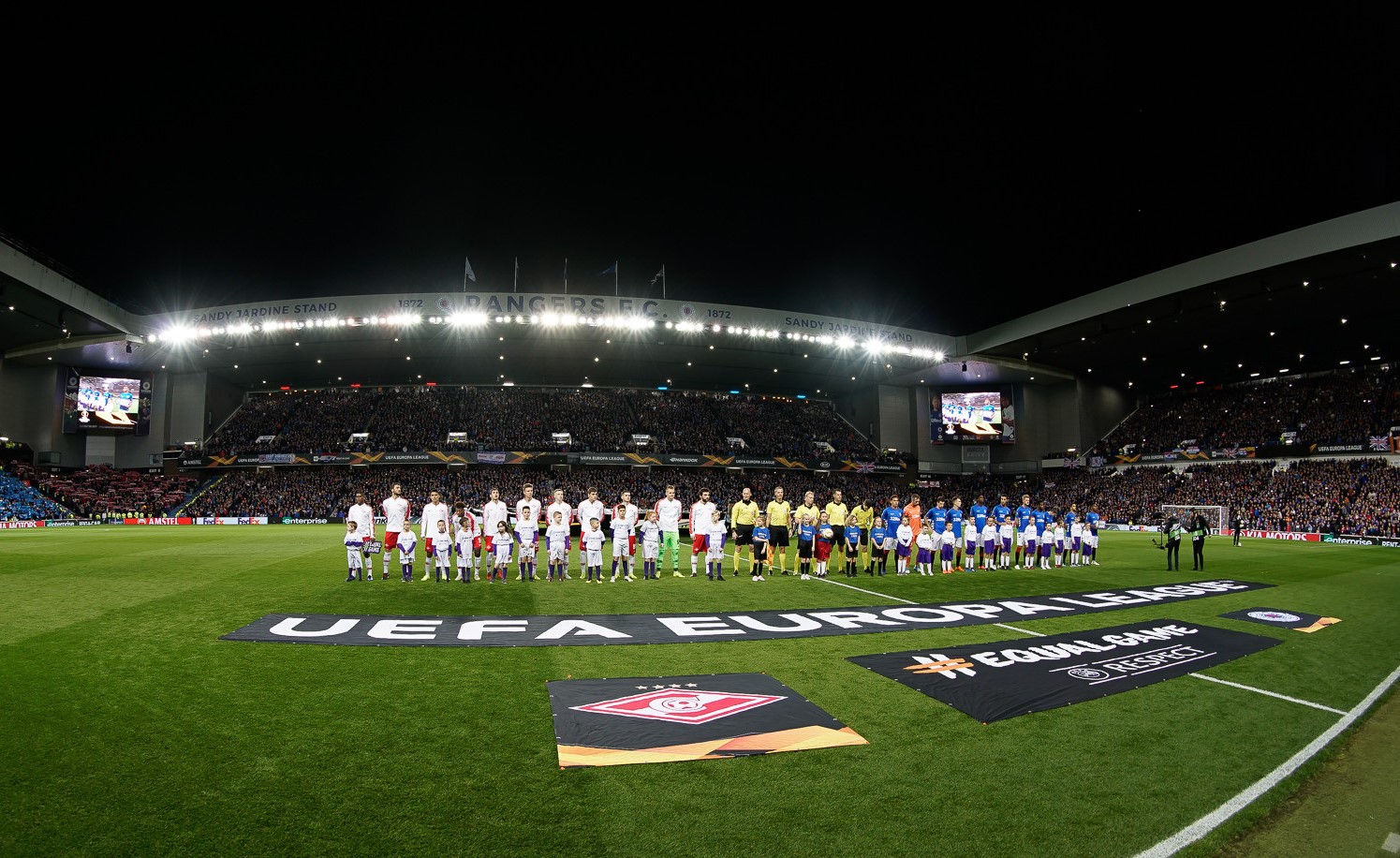
- Rangers and Spartak Moscow line up before their UEFA Europa League tie at Ibrox
- Chairman: Dave King
- Manager: Steven Gerrard
- Ground: Ibrox Stadium
- Scottish Premiership: 2nd
- Scottish Cup: Quarter-finals
- League Cup: Semi-finals
- Europa League: Group stage
- Top goalscorer: League: Alfredo Morelos (18); All: Alfredo Morelos (30)
- Highest home attendance: 50,171 v Villarreal (29 November 2018)
- Lowest home attendance: 35,042 v Ayr United (26 September 2018)
- Average home league attendance: 49,564
Home colours	Away colours	Third colours

The 2018–19 season was the 139th season of competitive football by Rangers.

Rangers competed in the Europa League, progressing through four qualifying rounds before being eliminated at the group stage. They were knocked out of both domestic cups (League Cup and Scottish Cup) by Aberdeen.

== Results and fixtures ==
Win Draw Loss Postponed

=== Pre-season and friendlies ===
3 July 2018 Friendly	Rangers	3–1	The New Saints	Auchenhowie
	Atakayi; Murphy; McCrorie	Report	Ebbe	Stadium: The Hummel Training Centre
Note: The match was played behind closed doors.

6 July 2018 Friendly	Rangers	6–0	Bury	Glasgow
19:15	Murphy 7'; Katić 31'; Arfield 35', 65'; Morelos 70'; Rudden 75'	Report		Stadium: Ibrox Stadium; Attendance: 41,015; Referee: Kevin Clancy

29 July 2018 Friendly	Rangers	3–0	Wigan Athletic	Glasgow
15:00	Morelos 52'; Katić 57'; Bruce 62' (o.g.)	Report		Stadium: Ibrox Stadium; Attendance: 28,779; Referee: Bobby Madden

20 January 2019 Friendly	Rangers	3–2	HJK Helsinki	Glasgow
12:00	Arfield 28'; Katić 53'; Candeias 75'	Report	Kouassivi-Benissan 30'; Lappalainen 55'	Stadium: Ibrox Stadium; Attendance: 21,224

=== Scottish Premiership ===
5 August 2018 1	Aberdeen	1–1	Rangers	Aberdeen
14:00	Ferguson (yellow card) 65'; Devlin (yellow card) 74'; Forrester (yellow card) 88'; Anderson 90+3'	Rangers Report; BBC Report; SPFL Report	Morelos (red card) 12'; Tavernier 30' (pen.); Arfield (yellow card) 74'; Goldson (yellow card) 79'	Stadium: Pittodrie Stadium; Attendance: 19,046; Referee: Kevin Clancy

12 August 2018 2	Rangers	2–0	St Mirren	Glasgow
16:00	Morelos 14'; Goldson 24'; R. McCrorie (red card) 31'; Barišić (yellow card) 33'	Rangers Report; BBC Report; SPFL Report	Mullen (yellow card) 28'; Smith (yellow card) 45'; Baird (yellow card) 69'; S. McGinn (yellow card) 88'	Stadium: Ibrox Stadium; Attendance: 49,680; Referee: Don Robertson

26 August 2018 3	Motherwell	3–3	Rangers	Motherwell
12:30	Johnson 3'; McHugh 18'; Campbell (yellow card) 37'; Hartley (yellow card) 49', (goal) 90+4'; Aldred (yellow card) 66'	Rangers Report; BBC Report; SPFL Report	Lafferty 15', 38'; Ejaria 43'; Barišić (yellow card) 55'; Halliday (yellow card) 67'	Stadium: Fir Park; Attendance: 9,545; Referee: Craig Thomson

2 September 2018 4	Celtic	1–0	Rangers	Glasgow
12:00	Brown (yellow card) 10'; Édouard (yellow card) 37'; Ntcham 62'	Rangers Report; BBC Report; SPFL Report	Barišić (yellow card) 29'; McGregor (yellow card) 50'; Morelos (yellow card) 70'; Goldson (yellow card) 85'	Stadium: Celtic Park; Attendance: 58,865; Referee: Willie Collum

15 September 2018 5	Rangers	4–0	Dundee	Glasgow
15:00	Coulibaly 4'; Kent 14'; Tavernier 45+3' (pen.); Morelos (yellow card) 69'; Goldson (yellow card) 72'; Middleton 83'	Rangers Report; BBC Report; SPFL Report	Kerr (yellow card) 35'; Ngwatala (yellow card) 42'; K. Miller (yellow card) 47' (red card) 79'; Curran (yellow card) 52'	Stadium: Ibrox Stadium; Attendance: 50,130; Referee: Kevin Clancy

23 September 2018 6	Rangers	5–1	St Johnstone	Glasgow
15:00	Tavernier 9'; Morelos 34'; Arfield 52'; Lafferty 74'; Candeias 79'	Rangers Report; BBC Report; SPFL Report	Foster (yellow card) 30'; Kerr (yellow card) 70'; Swanson (yellow card) 75'; Alston 77' (pen.)	Stadium: Ibrox Stadium; Attendance: 48,729; Referee: Steven McLean

30 September 2018 7	Livingston	1–0	Rangers	Livingston
13:30	Robinson (yellow card) 34'; Menga 34'; Burns (yellow card) 79'	Rangers Report; BBC Report; SPFL Report		Stadium: Tony Macaroni Arena; Attendance: 9,246; Referee: Craig Thomson

7 October 2018 8	Rangers	3–1	Heart of Midlothian	Glasgow
15:00	Kent 3'; Morelos 13'; Worrall (yellow card) 24'; Arfield 32', (yellow card) 40'	Rangers Report; BBC Report; SPFL Report	Smith (yellow card) 15' (yellow-red card) 55'; Dunne (yellow card) 27', (goal) 67'; Mitchell (yellow card) 43'	Stadium: Ibrox Stadium; Attendance: 49,865; Referee: John Beaton

21 October 2018 9	Hamilton Academical	1–4	Rangers	Hamilton
13:30	Miller (yellow card) 12'; Martin (yellow card) 18'; MacKinnon (yellow card) 75'; Boyd 80', (yellow card) 89'	Rangers Report; BBC Report; SPFL Report	Kent 41', (yellow card) 41'; Candeias (yellow card) 43'; Rossiter (yellow card) 72'; Morelos (yellow card) 75', (goal) 90+4'; Tavernier 84' (pen.), 87' (pen.); Halliday (yellow card) 90+1'	Stadium: The Hope CBD Stadium; Attendance: 5,013; Referee: Andrew Dallas

31 October 2018 11	Rangers	1–1	Kilmarnock	Glasgow
19:45	Morelos 9', (yellow card) 88'; Kent (yellow card) 67'; Jack (yellow card) 89'; Halliday (yellow card) 90+3'	Rangers Report; BBC Report; SPFL Report	Stewart 15'; Power (yellow card) 28'; Dicker (yellow card) 31'; Broadfoot (yellow card) 37'; O'Donnell (yellow card) 87'; Ndjoli (yellow card) 90'; Enobakhare (yellow card) 90+2'	Stadium: Ibrox Stadium; Attendance: 49,279; Referee: Nick Walsh

3 November 2018 12	St Mirren	0–2	Rangers	Paisley
12:30	Erhahon (yellow card) 39'; McShane (yellow card) 75'; Ferdinand (yellow card) 90+3'	Rangers Report; BBC Report; SPFL Report	Jack (yellow card) 30'; Arfield (yellow card) 39'; Candeias 80', (yellow card) 81' (yellow-red card) 90+3'; Morelos 90+2'	Stadium: Simple Digital Arena; Attendance: 6,033; Referee: Willie Collum

11 November 2018 13	Rangers	7–1	Motherwell	Glasgow
15:00	Arfield 8', 60'; Tavernier 35' (pen.); Morelos 38'; Middleton 59'; Grezda 68', 75'	Rangers Report; BBC Report; SPFL Report	Main 25'; McHugh (yellow card) 30' (yellow-red card) 34'; Hartley (yellow card) 50'	Stadium: Ibrox Stadium; Attendance: 49,802; Referee: Craig Thomson

24 November 2018 14	Rangers	3–0	Livingston	Glasgow
15:00	Candeias 20'; Arfield (yellow card) 28', (goal) 88'; Morelos 83', (yellow card) 86'	Rangers Report; BBC Report; SPFL Report		Stadium: Ibrox Stadium; Attendance: 49,448; Referee: Nick Walsh

2 December 2018 15	Heart of Midlothian	1–2	Rangers	Edinburgh
12:00	McAuley 27' (o.g.)	Rangers Report; BBC Report; SPFL Report	Goldson 35'; Morelos 41'; Grezda (yellow card) 63'; Arfield (red card) 72'	Stadium: Tynecastle Park; Attendance: 19,429; Referee: Bobby Madden

5 December 2018 16	Rangers	0–1	Aberdeen	Glasgow
19:45	Morelos (yellow card) 45+2' (yellow-red card) 64'; Lafferty (yellow card) 49'; McGregor (yellow card) 89'	Rangers Report; BBC Report; SPFL Report	McKenna 7'; Cosgrove (yellow card) 10' (yellow-red card) 34'; Shinnie (yellow card) 53'	Stadium: Ibrox Stadium; Attendance: 50,101; Referee: Steven McLean

9 December 2018 17	Dundee	1–1	Rangers	Dundee
13:30	Miller 9'; Ralph (red card) 20'; Kusunga (yellow card) 42'	Rangers Report; BBC Report; SPFL Report	Jack (yellow card) 14'; Halliday 21'; Lafferty (yellow card) 43'	Stadium: Kilmac Stadium at Dens Park; Attendance: 8,578; Referee: Alan Muir

16 December 2018 18	Rangers	1–0	Hamilton Academical	Glasgow
15:00	Candeias 3'; Lafferty (yellow card) 90+2'	Rangers Report; BBC Report; SPFL Report	Gordon (yellow card) 39'; Taiwo (yellow card) 67'	Stadium: Ibrox Stadium; Attendance: 49,055; Referee: Euan Anderson

19 December 2018 10	Hibernian	0–0	Rangers	Edinburgh
19:45	Porteous (yellow card) 80'; Slivka (yellow card) 90+2'	Rangers Report; BBC Report; SPFL Report	Goldson (yellow card) 90+2'	Stadium: Easter Road; Attendance: 18,662; Referee: Craig Thomson

23 December 2018 19	St Johnstone	1–2	Rangers	Perth
12:15	Kennedy 45'; Craig (yellow card) 54'; Alston (yellow card) 87'; Watt (yellow card) 90+3'	Rangers Report; BBC Report; SPFL Report	Goldson (yellow card) 62'; Morelos 65', 88', (yellow card) 89'	Stadium: McDiarmid Park; Attendance: 7,086; Referee: Nick Walsh

26 December 2018 20	Rangers	1–1	Hibernian	Glasgow
15:00	Morelos 25'	Rangers Report; BBC Report; SPFL Report	Mallan (yellow card) 54'; McGregor 86'; Mackie (yellow card) 90+3'	Stadium: Ibrox Stadium; Attendance: 49,885; Referee: Andrew Dallas

29 December 2018 21	Rangers	1–0	Celtic	Glasgow
12:30	Jack 30'; Halliday (yellow card) 88'	Rangers Report; BBC Report; SPFL Report	Lustig (yellow card) 45+2'; Ajer (yellow card) 76'; Brown (yellow card) 78'	Stadium: Ibrox Stadium; Attendance: 50,128; Referee: John Beaton

23 January 2019 22	Kilmarnock	2–1	Rangers	Kilmarnock
19:45	Bachmann (yellow card) 12'; Brophy 22', (yellow card) 73'; Jones 66'; Tshibola (yellow card) 70'; Dicker (yellow card) 88'; Power (yellow card) 90+3'	Rangers Report; BBC Report; SPFL Report	Defoe 13'; McAuley (yellow card) 33'; Morelos (yellow card) 50'	Stadium: Rugby Park; Attendance: 12,374; Referee: Don Robertson

27 January 2019 23	Livingston	0–3	Rangers	Livingston
16:00	Lamie (yellow card) 27'; Jacobs (yellow card) 86'	Rangers Report; BBC Report; SPFL Report	Jack 30'; McCrorie (yellow card) 36'; Kent 48'; Morelos 74'	Stadium: Almondvale Stadium; Attendance: 9,028; Referee: Kevin Clancy

2 February 2019 24	Rangers	4–0	St Mirren	Glasgow
15:00	Tavernier 3' (pen.), 55' (pen.), (penalty missed) 26'; Morelos (yellow card) 39'; McCrorie (yellow card) 49'; Defoe 80' (pen.); Kent 81'	Rangers Report; BBC Report; SPFL Report	Baird (yellow card) 26'; P. McGinn (yellow card) 44'	Stadium: Ibrox Stadium; Attendance: 49,463; Referee: Andrew Dallas

6 February 2019 25	Aberdeen	2–4	Rangers	Aberdeen
19:45	Cosgrove 31', 47' (pen.); Logan (yellow card) 36'; McKenna (red card) 55'; Ferguson (yellow card) 78'	Rangers Report; BBC Report; SPFL Report	Morelos 20', 38', (red card) 57'; Tavernier 43' (pen.); Candeias (yellow card) 70'; Arfield (yellow card) 72'; Defoe 90+4'	Stadium: Pittodrie Stadium; Attendance: 19,190; Referee: Bobby Madden

16 February 2019 26	Rangers	0–0	St Johnstone	Glasgow
15:00		Rangers Report; BBC Report; SPFL Report		Stadium: Ibrox Stadium; Attendance: 49,549; Referee: Steven McLean

24 February 2019 27	Hamilton Academical	0–5	Rangers	Hamilton
12:15	Andreu (yellow card) 69'	Rangers Report; BBC Report; SPFL Report	Jack 16'; Defoe 17'; Arfield 24'; Tavernier 44' (pen.); Lafferty 88'	Stadium: The Hope CBD Stadium; Attendance: 5,827; Referee: Nick Walsh

27 February 2019 28	Rangers	4–0	Dundee	Glasgow
19:45	Kamara 4'; Tavernier 8'; Morelos 23'; Defoe 89'	Rangers Report; BBC Report; SPFL Report	O'Dea (yellow card) 71'; Woods (yellow card) 80'	Stadium: Ibrox Stadium; Attendance: 48,859; Referee: Don Robertson

8 March 2019 29	Hibernian	1–1	Rangers	Edinburgh
19:45	McGregor (yellow card) 8' (yellow-red card) 90+2'; Gray (yellow card) 55'; Kamberi 76', (yellow card) 90'; Hanlon (yellow card) 90+3'	Rangers Report; BBC Report; SPFL Report	Candeias 43'; Goldson (yellow card) 49'; Worrall (yellow card) 88'; Jack (yellow card) 90+3'	Stadium: Easter Road; Attendance: 20,065; Referee: Steven McLean

16 March 2019 30	Rangers	1–1	Kilmarnock	Glasgow
15:00	McGregor (yellow card) 24'; Morelos 64'; Goldson (yellow card) 90+3'	Rangers Report; BBC Report; SPFL Report	McAleny 29'; Mulumbu (yellow card) 57'; Power (yellow card) 60'; O'Donnell (yellow card) 73'; Findlay (yellow card) 81'	Stadium: Ibrox Stadium; Attendance: 50,117; Referee: Greg Aitken

31 March 2019 31	Celtic	2–1	Rangers	Glasgow
12:00	Hayes (yellow card) 26'; Édouard 27', (yellow card) 28'; Brown (yellow card) 80'; Forrest 86'; Lustig (yellow card) 90+7'	Rangers Report; BBC Report; SPFL Report	Morelos (red card) 31'; Arfield (yellow card) 43'; Kent 63'; Halliday (yellow card) 90+2' (yellow-red card) 90+7'	Stadium: Celtic Park; Attendance: 58,773; Referee: Bobby Madden

3 April 2019 32	Rangers	3–0	Heart of Midlothian	Glasgow
19:45	Defoe 16'; Goldson 21'; Flanagan (yellow card) 40'; Arfield 48'	Rangers Report; BBC Report; SPFL Report	Godinho (yellow card) 57'; Djoum (yellow card) 67'	Stadium: Ibrox Stadium; Attendance: 50,088; Referee: Kevin Clancy

7 April 2019 33	Motherwell	0–3	Rangers	Motherwell
12:30	Main (yellow card) 44'; Grimshaw (yellow card) 45'	Rangers Report; BBC Report; SPFL Report	Arfield 22', 39', 60'	Stadium: Fir Park; Attendance: 9,200; Referee: Nick Walsh

20 April 2019 34	Heart of Midlothian	1–3	Rangers	Edinburgh
12:00	Burns (yellow card) 63'; MacLean 74'	Rangers Report; BBC Report; SPFL Report	Defoe 15', (yellow card) 81'; Jack 36'; Katić 48'	Stadium: Tynecastle Park; Attendance: 18,212; Referee: John Beaton

28 April 2019 35	Rangers	2–0	Aberdeen	Glasgow
15:00	Defoe (yellow card) 33'; Tavernier 48' (pen.), 80' (pen.)	Rangers Report; BBC Report; SPFL Report	Considine (yellow card) 44' (yellow-red card) 79'; Lewis (yellow card) 81'; McKenna (yellow card) 90+1'	Stadium: Ibrox Stadium; Attendance: 50,008; Referee: Don Robertson

5 May 2019 36	Rangers	1–0	Hibernian	Glasgow
15:30	Defoe 41'; McGregor (red card) 89'	Rangers Report; BBC Report; SPFL Report	Mallan (yellow card) 40'; Milligan (yellow card) 71'; McNulty (yellow card) 89'	Stadium: Ibrox Stadium; Attendance: 50,102; Referee: Bobby Madden

12 May 2019 37	Rangers	2–0	Celtic	Glasgow
12:00	Tavernier 2'; Flanagan (yellow card) 51'; Arfield 63', (yellow card) 64'	Rangers Report; BBC Report; SPFL Report	Hayes (yellow card) 74'; Ajer (yellow card) 76'	Stadium: Ibrox Stadium; Attendance: 50,209; Referee: Kevin Clancy

19 May 2019 38	Kilmarnock	2–1	Rangers	Kilmarnock
15:00	Burke 9'; O'Donnell (yellow card) 76'; Brophy 89' (pen.)	Rangers Report; BBC Report; SPFL Report	Flanagan (yellow card) 21'; Morelos 66', (yellow card) 68'; Barišić (yellow card) 88'	Stadium: Rugby Park; Attendance: 12,248; Referee: Willie Collum

=== League Cup ===
19 August 2018 Second round	Kilmarnock	1–3	Rangers	Kilmarnock
13:30	Dicker (yellow card) 21'; K. Boyd (yellow card) 45+1'; Barišić 51' (o.g.); Power (yellow card) 73'	Rangers Report; BBC Report; SPFL Report	Candeias (yellow card) 24'; Morelos 28', 43', 74', (yellow card) 60'; Arfield (yellow card) 77'	Stadium: Rugby Park; Attendance: 12,016; Referee: Nick Walsh

26 September 2018 Quarter-final	Rangers	4–0	Ayr United	Glasgow
19:45	Katić 16'; Middleton 31', 70'; Morelos (yellow card) 37', (goal) 49'; Grezda (yellow card) 73'	Rangers Report; BBC Report; SPFL Report		Stadium: Ibrox Stadium; Attendance: 35,042; Referee: Bobby Madden

28 October 2018 Semi-final	Aberdeen	1–0	Rangers	Glasgow
16:30	Shinnie (yellow card) 3'; Ferguson (yellow card) 45+7', (goal) 79'; McKenna (yellow card) 54'; Lewis (yellow card) 90'	Rangers Report; BBC Report; SPFL Report	Ejaria (yellow card) 2'; Sadiq (yellow card) 83'	Stadium: Hampden Park; Attendance: 46,186; Referee: John Beaton

=== Scottish Cup ===
30 January 2019 Fourth round	Cowdenbeath	1–3	Rangers	Cowdenbeath
19:45	Renton (yellow card) 35'; Swann (penalty missed) 47'; Cox 47'; Mullen (yellow card) 72'	Rangers Report; BBC Report	Halliday 12'; Coulibaly 23'; Lafferty 45+1', (yellow card) 63'	Stadium: Central Park; Attendance: 4,116; Referee: Craig Thomson

9 February 2019 Fifth round	Kilmarnock	0–0	Rangers	Kilmarnock
17:15	Broadfoot (yellow card) 15'; Power (yellow card) 25'; S. Boyd (yellow card) 45+1'	Rangers Report; BBC Report		Stadium: Rugby Park; Attendance: 11,430; Referee: Alan Muir

20 February 2019 Fifth Round R	Rangers	5–0	Kilmarnock	Glasgow
19:45	Morelos 7', 45+1', 78', 83'; Halliday 77'	Rangers Report; BBC Report	Bachmann (red card) 25'; Tshibola (yellow card) 77'	Stadium: Ibrox Stadium; Attendance: 37,918; Referee: Alan Muir

3 March 2019 Quarter-final	Aberdeen	1–1	Rangers	Aberdeen
13:30	Cosgrove 11' (pen.), (yellow card) 71'; McLennan (yellow card) 53'; Shinnie (yellow card) 72'; Lowe (yellow card) 78'	Rangers Report; BBC Report	Morelos (yellow card) 15'; Worrall 49'	Stadium: Pittodrie Stadium; Attendance: 15,395; Referee: Kevin Clancy

12 March 2019 Quarter-final R	Rangers	0–2	Aberdeen	Glasgow
19:45	Candeias (yellow card) 30'; Morelos (yellow card) 33'; Davis (yellow card) 90+1'	Rangers Report; BBC Report	McGinn 3', (yellow card) 53'; McKenna (yellow card) 34'; May (yellow card) 38'; Ferguson (yellow card) 42'; McLennan 62'; Shinnie (yellow card) 67'; Ball (yellow card) 70'; Campbell (yellow card) 79'; Considine (yellow card) 82'	Stadium: Ibrox Stadium; Attendance: 47,397; Referee: Kevin Clancy

=== Europa League ===
==== Qualification stage ====
12 July 2018 1QR 1st leg	Rangers (Scotland)	2–0	(North Macedonia) Shkupi	Glasgow, Scotland
19:45 BST	Murphy 23'; Candeias (yellow card) 47'; Morelos (yellow card) 82'; Tavernier 90+2' (pen.)	Report	Ilijoski (yellow card) 32'; Muarem (yellow card) 77'; Owono (yellow card) 88'; Adem (yellow card) 90+1'	Stadium: Ibrox Stadium; Attendance: 49,309; Referee: Christian Dingert (Germany)

17 July 2018 1QR 2nd leg	Shkupi (North Macedonia)	0–0 (0–2 agg.)	(Scotland) Rangers	Skopje, Republic of Macedonia
16:55 BST	Stojkoski (yellow card) 44'; Ilijoski (yellow card) 46'; Muarem (yellow card) 59'; Broja (yellow card) 62'; Tipurić (yellow card) 67'	Report	Windass (yellow card) 59'	Stadium: Philip II Arena; Attendance: 4,750; Referee: Halil Umut Meler (Turkey)

26 July 2018 2QR 1st leg	Osijek (Croatia)	0–1	(Scotland) Rangers	Osijek, Croatia
19:45 BST	Škorić (yellow card) 59'; Pušić (yellow card) 61'; Henty (yellow card) 87'; Lyopa (yellow card) 90+4'	Report	Morelos 18'; Flanagan (yellow card) 66'	Stadium: Stadion Gradski vrt Attendance: 7,112; Referee: Paweł Gil (Poland)

2 August 2018 2QR 2nd leg	Rangers (Scotland)	1–1 (2–1 agg.)	(Croatia) Osijek	Glasgow, Scotland
19:45 BST	Katić 53', (yellow card) 90+4'; Flanagan (yellow card) 71'; Tavernier (yellow card) 73'	Report	Marić (yellow card) 40'; Škorić (yellow card) 51'; Grgić (yellow card) 83'; Goldson 89' (o.g.); Henty (yellow card) 90+4'	Stadium: Ibrox Stadium; Attendance: 48,202; Referee: Dennis Higler (Netherlands)

9 August 2018 3QR 1st leg	Rangers (Scotland)	3–1	(Slovenia) Maribor	Glasgow, Scotland
19:45 BST	Morelos 6'; Flanagan (yellow card) 21'; Tavernier 50' (pen.); Ejaria (yellow card) 69'; Coulibaly 86'	Report	Bajde 40'; Ivković (yellow card) 50'; Šuler (yellow card) 85'	Stadium: Ibrox Stadium; Attendance: 48,001; Referee: Roi Reinshreiber (Israel)

16 August 2018 3QR 2nd leg	Maribor (Slovenia)	0–0 (1–3 agg.)	(Scotland) Rangers	Maribor, Slovenia
19:15 BST	Ivković (yellow card) 90+3'	Report	Ejaria (yellow card) 27'; Candeias (yellow card) 32'; Jack (yellow card) 35'; Murphy (yellow card) 74'; Arfield (yellow card) 89'	Stadium: Ljudski vrt Attendance: 11,166; Referee: Jonathan Lardot (Belgium)

23 August 2018 PO 1st leg	Rangers (Scotland)	1–0	(Russia) Ufa	Glasgow, Scotland
19:45 BST	Goldson 41', (yellow card) 90+4'; Lafferty (yellow card) 72'	Report	Igboun (yellow card) 57'; Zaseyev (yellow card) 76'; Paurević (yellow card) 90'	Stadium: Ibrox Stadium; Attendance: 49,338; Referee: Daniel Stefański (Poland)

30 August 2018 PO 2st leg	Ufa (Russia)	1–1 (1–2 agg.)	(Scotland) Rangers	Ufa, Russia
16:00 BST	Sysuyev 32'; Salatić (yellow card) 34'; Paurević (yellow card) 82'; Igboun (yellow card) 86'	Report	Ejaria 10'; Flanagan (yellow card) 15' (yellow-red card) 66'; Morelos (yellow card) 37' (yellow-red card) 38'	Stadium: Neftyanik Stadium; Attendance: 13,186; Referee: Tobias Stieler (Germany)

==== Group stage ====
Pos	Team	Pld	W	D	L	GF	GA	GD	Pts	Qualification	VIL	RW	RAN	SPM
1	(Spain) Villarreal	6	2	4	0	12	5	+7	10 (Note: Head-to-head points: Villarreal 4, Rapid Wien 1.)	Advance to knockout phase	—	5–0	2–2	2–0
2	(Austria) Rapid Wien	6	3	1	2	6	9	−3	10	Advance to knockout phase	0–0	—	1–0	2–0
3	(Scotland) Rangers	6	1	3	2	8	8	0	6		0–0	3–1	—	0–0
4	(Russia) Spartak Moscow	6	1	2	3	8	12	−4	5		3–3	1–2	4–3	—

Source: UEFA
Notes:

20 September 2018 1	Villarreal (Spain)	2–2	(Scotland) Rangers	Villarreal, Spain
17:55 BST	Bacca 1'; Balagueró 69'; Miguelón (yellow card) 72'	Report	Goldson (yellow card) 17'; Arfield 67'; Lafferty 76'; Dorrans (yellow card) 90+3'	Stadium: Estadio de la Cerámica; Attendance: 15,982; Referee: István Kovács (Romania)

4 October 2018 2	Rangers (Scotland)	3–1	(Austria) Rapid Wien	Glasgow, Scotland
20:00 BST	McGregor (yellow card) 43'; Morelos 43', 90+4'; Tavernier 84' (pen.)	Report	Berisha (yellow card) 11', (goal) 42'; Ivan (yellow card) 51'; Müldür (yellow card) 63'; Schwab (yellow card) 68'; Pavlović (yellow card) 90+1'	Stadium: Ibrox Stadium; Attendance: 47,534; Referee: Ruddy Buquet (France)

25 October 2018 3	Rangers (Scotland)	0–0	(Russia) Spartak Moscow	Glasgow, Scotland
20:00 BST	Morelos (yellow card) 45+2'; Candeias (yellow card) 59'	Report	Dzhikiya (yellow card) 33'; Fernando (yellow card) 45'	Stadium: Ibrox Stadium; Attendance: 49,068; Referee: Kevin Blom (Netherlands)

8 November 2018 4	Spartak Moscow (Russia)	4–3	(Scotland) Rangers	Moscow, Russia
17:55 GMT	Popov (yellow card) 15'; Melgarejo 22', (yellow card) 76'; Rasskazov (yellow card) 28'; Fernando (yellow card) 30'; Goldson 35' (o.g.); Luiz Adriano 58'; Hanni 59'; Bocchetti (yellow card) 63'	Report	Erëmenko 5' (o.g.); Candeias 27'; Coulibaly (yellow card) 34'; Middleton 41'; Morelos (yellow card) 78'	Stadium: Otkritie Arena; Attendance: 22,296; Referee: Ivan Bebek (Croatia)

29 November 2018 5	Rangers (Scotland)	0–0	(Spain) Villarreal	Glasgow, Scotland
20:00 GMT	Candeias (yellow card) 36' (yellow-red card) 44'; Flanagan (yellow card) 90'; Middleton (yellow card) 90+4'	Report	Gaspar (yellow card) 35'; Álvaro (yellow card) 90+1'	Stadium: Ibrox Stadium; Attendance: 50,171; Referee: Matej Jug (Slovenia)

13 December 2018 6	Rapid Wien (Austria)	1–0	(Scotland) Rangers	Vienna, Austria
17:55 GMT	Ivan (yellow card) 26'; Müldür (yellow card) 42'; Martic (yellow card) 50'; Ljubicic 84'	Report	Jack (yellow card) 43'; Goldson (yellow card) 60'	Stadium: Allianz Stadion; Attendance: 23,850; Referee: Paolo Mazzoleni (Italy)

== Squad statistics ==
The table below includes all players registered with the SPFL as part of the Rangers squad for 2018–19 season. They may not have made an appearance.

=== Appearances, goals and discipline ===
No.	Pos.	Nat.	Name	Totals		Scottish Premiership		Scottish Cup		League Cup		Europa League		Discipline	
No.	Pos.	Nat.	Name	Apps	Goals	Apps	Goals	Apps	Goals	Apps	Goals	Apps	Goals	Yellow card	Red card
Goalkeepers
1	GK	(Scotland) SCO	Allan McGregor	52	0	34	0	3	0	1	0	14	0	4	1
13	GK	(England) ENG	Wes Foderingham	8	0	4	0	2	0	2	0	0	0	0	0
32	GK	(England) ENG	Andy Firth	1	0	0+1	0	0	0	0	0	0	0	0	0
Defenders
2	DF	(England) ENG	James Tavernier (captain)	57	17	36+1	14	4	0	2	0	14	3	1	0
3	DF	(England) ENG	Joe Worrall	32	1	20+2	0	4	1	2	0	4	0	2	0
5	DF	(Scotland) SCO	Lee Wallace	3	0	0+3	0	0	0	0	0	0	0	0	0
6	DF	(England) ENG	Connor Goldson	54	4	34	3	4	0	2	0	14	1	10	0
15	DF	(England) ENG	Jon Flanagan	30	0	14+2	0	1	0	2	0	11	0	9	1
19	DF	(Bosnia and Herzegovina) BIH	Nikola Katić	30	3	16+2	1	1	0	2	1	9	1	1	0
24	DF	(Scotland) SCO	Aidan Wilson	0	0	0	0	0	0	0	0	0	0	0	0
25	DF	(United States) USA	Matt Polster	1	0	0+1	0	0	0	0	0	0	0	0	0
31	DF	(Croatia) CRO	Borna Barišić	22	0	14+2	0	3	0	1	0	2	0	4	0
36	DF	(Northern Ireland) NIR	Gareth McAuley	10	0	6+1	0	1	0	0	0	1+1	0	1	0
Midfielders
4	MF	(Scotland) SCO	Graham Dorrans	3	0	0+1	0	0	0	1	0	0+1	0	0	0
8	MF	(Scotland) SCO	Ryan Jack	46	4	26+4	4	5	0	1	0	9+1	0	6	0
10	MF	(Northern Ireland) NIR	Steven Davis	18	0	10+4	0	1+3	0	0	0	0+0	0	1	0
14	MF	(England) ENG	Ryan Kent	43	6	25+2	6	4	0	3	0	7+2	0	2	0
16	MF	(Scotland) SCO	Andy Halliday	35	3	18+5	1	2+1	2	2	0	2+5	0	6	1
17	MF	(Scotland) SCO	Ross McCrorie	31	0	11+9	0	1	0	1+1	0	3+5	0	2	1
18	MF	(Finland) FIN	Glen Kamara	16	1	12+1	1	3	0	0	0	0	0	0	0
21	MF	(Portugal) POR	Daniel Candeias	52	6	26+7	5	5	0	1+1	0	12	1	10	2
23	MF	(Mali) MLI	Lassana Coulibaly	30	3	14+5	1	1	1	1	0	9	1	1	0
27	MF	(Scotland) SCO	Stephen Kelly	1	0	0	0	0	0	0+1	0	0	0	0	0
35	MF	(Albania) ALB	Eros Grezda	17	2	7+6	2	0	0	0+1	0	0+3	0	2	0
37	MF	(Canada) CAN	Scott Arfield	46	12	28+1	11	4	0	1+1	0	10+1	1	9	1
39	MF	(Scotland) SCO	Liam Burt	0	0	0	0	0	0	0	0	0	0	0	0
40	MF	(Scotland) SCO	Glenn Middleton	28	5	4+11	2	0+1	0	1+1	2	3+7	1	1	0
Forwards
7	FW	(Scotland) SCO	Jamie Murphy	8	1	2	0	0	0	1	0	4+1	1	1	0
9	FW	(England) ENG	Jermain Defoe	20	8	10+7	8	1+2	0	0	0	0	0	2	0
11	FW	(Northern Ireland) NIR	Kyle Lafferty	30	6	6+15	4	1+3	1	0	0	1+4	1	4	0
20	FW	(Colombia) COL	Alfredo Morelos	48	30	27+3	18	3	4	2	4	12+1	4	19	5
62	FW	(Scotland) SCO	Dapo Mebude	1	0	0+1	0	0	0	0	0	0	0	0	0
Players transferred or loaned out during the season
9	FW	(Nigeria) NGR	Umar Sadiq	4	0	0+1	0	0	0	1+1	0	0+1	0	1	0
10	MF	(England) ENG	Ovie Ejaria	28	2	11+3	1	0	0	3	0	9+2	1	3	0
11	MF	(England) ENG	Josh Windass	5	0	1	0	0	0	0	0	2+2	0	2	0
18	MF	(England) ENG	Jordan Rossiter	5	0	2+2	0	0	0	0+1	0	0	0	1	0
22	MF	(Scotland) SCO	Greg Docherty	0	0	0	0	0	0	0	0	0	0	0	0
25	GK	(England) ENG	Jak Alnwick	0	0	0	0	0	0	0	0	0	0	0	0
26	DF	(Northern Ireland) NIR	Lee Hodson	0	0	0	0	0	0	0	0	0	0	0	0
28	GK	(Scotland) SCO	Robby McCrorie	0	0	0	0	0	0	0	0	0	0	0	0
29	FW	(Scotland) SCO	Zak Rudden	0	0	0	0	0	0	0	0	0	0	0	0
30	DF	(Scotland) SCO	Kyle Bradley	0	0	0	0	0	0	0	0	0	0	0	0
33	MF	(Scotland) SCO	Jamie Barjonas	0	0	0	0	0	0	0	0	0	0	0	0
45	FW	(Finland) FIN	Serge Atakayi	1	0	0+1	0	0	0	0	0	0	0	0	0
49	DF	(Scotland) SCO	Jordan Houston	1	0	0	0	0+1	0	0	0	0	0	0	0
−	DF	(Malta) MLT	Myles Beerman	0	0	0	0	0	0	0	0	0	0	0	0
−	MF	(Scotland) SCO	Jason Holt	0	0	0	0	0	0	0	0	0	0	0	0
−	MF	(Mexico) MEX	Carlos Peña	0	0	0	0	0	0	0	0	0	0	0	0
−	FW	(Ghana) GHA	Joe Dodoo	0	0	0	0	0	0	0	0	0	0	0	0
−	FW	(Scotland) SCO	Ryan Hardie	0	0	0	0	0	0	0	0	0	0	0	0
−	FW	(Mexico) MEX	Eduardo Herrera	0	0	0	0	0	0	0	0	0	0	0	0

- Last updated: 19 May 2019

Appearances (starts and substitute appearances) and goals include those in Scottish Premiership, League Cup, Scottish Cup, and the UEFA Europa League

== Club ==
=== Technical Staff ===
Name	Role
Manager	(England) Steven Gerrard
Assistant Manager	(Scotland) Gary McAllister
First Team Coach	(England) Michael Beale
Technical Coach	(England) Tom Culshaw
Goalkeeping Coach	(Scotland) Colin Stewart
Head of Scouting	(England) Andy Scoulding
Club Scouts	(Scotland) John Brown (Scotland) Billy McLaren (England) David Swanick
Scouting Coordinator	(England) Rob Clarkson
Doctor	(England) Dr Mark Waller
Head of Performance	(England) Jordan Milsom
Head of Preparation	(Scotland) Craig Flannigan
Head of Strength and Conditioning	(Greece) Paraskevas Polychronopoulos
Physiotherapist	(England) Steve Walker
Masseur	(Scotland) David Lavery
Kit Executive	(Scotland) Jimmy Bell

=== Kit ===
Supplier: Hummel / Sponsors: 32Red (front) and Utilita (back)

The kits were produced with manufacturer Hummell and was the first year in a three-year deal.

Home	Away	Third	Fourth	Goalkeeper 1	Goalkeeper 2

- Home: The home strip continues to be royal blue but will include the iconic brand's chevrons on the side panels.
- Away: The away kit is a white jersey with red and royal blue diagonal stripes, paired with royal blue shorts.
- Third: The third strip is mandarin orange, with royal blue chevrons.
- Fourth The fourth strip is red, with black chevrons and black shorts.

== Club statistics ==
=== Competition overview ===
Competition	First match	Last match	Starting round	Final position	Record							
Competition	First match	Last match	Starting round	Final position	Pld	W	D	L	GF	GA	GD	Win %
Europa League	12 July 2018	13 December 2018	1st Round	Group Stage	14	5	7	2	17	11	+6	35.71
Premiership	5 August 2018	19 May 2019	Matchday 1	2nd	38	23	9	6	82	27	+55	60.53
League Cup	19 August 2018	28 October 2018	2nd Round	Semi-Final	3	2	0	1	7	2	+5	66.67
Scottish Cup	31 January 2019	12 March 2019	4th Round	Quarter-Final	5	2	2	1	9	4	+5	40.00
Total					60	32	18	10	115	44	+71	53.33

Source: Competitions

=== League table ===
Pos	Team	Pld	W	D	L	GF	GA	GD	Pts	Qualification or relegation (Note: Teams play each other three times (33 matches), before the league is split into two groups (the top six and the bottom six).)
1	Celtic (C)	38	27	6	5	77	20	+57	87	Qualification for the Champions League first qualifying round
2	Rangers	38	23	9	6	82	27	+55	78	Qualification for the Europa League first qualifying round (Note: Since the winners of the 2018–19 Scottish Cup, Celtic, qualified for European competition based on league position, the spot awarded to the Scottish Cup winners (Europa League first qualifying round) was passed to the fourth-placed team.)
3	Kilmarnock	38	19	10	9	50	31	+19	67	Qualification for the Europa League first qualifying round
4	Aberdeen	38	20	7	11	57	44	+13	67	Qualification for the Europa League first qualifying round
5	Hibernian	38	14	12	12	51	39	+12	54	

Source: Soccerway BBC
Rules for classification: 1) Points; 2) Goal difference; 3) Goals scored; 4) Play-off (only if deciding champion, UEFA competitions qualification and second stage group allocation).
(C) Champions

== Transfers ==
=== Players in ===
Date	Player	From	Fee
14 May 2018	(Canada) Scott Arfield	(England) Burnley	Free
16 May 2018	(Scotland) Allan McGregor	(England) Hull City	Free
18 May 2018	(Scotland) Jamie Murphy	(England) Brighton & Hove Albion	Undisclosed
12 June 2018	(Bosnia and Herzegovina) Nikola Katić	(Croatia) NK Slaven Belupo	Undisclosed
13 June 2018	(England) Connor Goldson	(England) Brighton & Hove Albion	Undisclosed
21 June 2018	(England) Jon Flanagan	(England) Liverpool	Free
7 August 2018	(Croatia) Borna Barišić	(Croatia) NK Osijek	£2,200,000
22 August 2018	(Northern Ireland) Kyle Lafferty	(Scotland) Heart of Midlothian	Undisclosed
31 August 2018	(Albania) Eros Grezda	(Croatia) NK Osijek	Undisclosed
3 September 2018	(Northern Ireland) Gareth McAuley	(England) West Bromwich Albion	Free
25 January 2019	(England) Andy Firth	(England) Barrow	Undisclosed
30 January 2019	(United States) Matt Polster	(United States) Chicago Fire	Free
31 January 2019	(Finland) Glen Kamara	(Scotland) Dundee	£50,000

=== Players out ===
Date	Player	To	Fee
1 June 2018	(Scotland) Kenny Miller	(Scotland) Livingston	Free
1 June 2018	(Scotland) David Bates	(Germany) Hamburg	Development Fee
1 June 2018	(Northern Ireland) Jordan Thompson	(England) Blackpool	Free
8 June 2018	(Scotland) Liam Kelly	(Scotland) Livingston	Undisclosed
16 June 2018	(Scotland) Michael O'Halloran	(Australia) Melbourne City	Undisclosed
11 July 2018	(Portugal) Bruno Alves	(Italy) Parma	Free
18 July 2018	(England) Harry Forrester	(Iran) Tractor Sazi	Free
30 July 2018	(Portugal) Fábio Cardoso	(Portugal) Santa Clara	Free
9 August 2018	(Wales) Declan John	(Wales) Swansea City	Undisclosed
9 August 2018	(England) Josh Windass	(England) Wigan Athletic	£2,500,000
5 February 2019	(Mexico) Carlos Peña	(Poland) GKS Tychy	Free

=== Loans in ===
Start date	End date	Player	From	Fee
7 June 2018	15 December 2018	(England) Ovie Ejaria	(England) Liverpool	Loan
10 July 2018	15 December 2018	(Nigeria) Umar Sadiq	(Italy) Roma	Loan
10 July 2018	30 June 2019	(Mali) Lassana Coulibaly	(France) Angers SCO	Loan
22 July 2018	30 June 2019	(England) Ryan Kent	(England) Liverpool	Loan
31 August 2018	30 June 2019	(England) Joe Worrall	(England) Nottingham Forest	Loan
6 January 2019	30 June 2020	(England) Jermain Defoe	(England) AFC Bournemouth	Loan
6 January 2019	30 June 2019	(Northern Ireland) Steven Davis	(England) Southampton	Loan

=== Loans out ===
Start date	End date	Player	To	Fee
7 June 2018	31 December 2018	(Mexico) Carlos Peña	(Mexico) Club Necaxa	Loan
13 June 2018	31 May 2019	(Ghana) Joe Dodoo	(England) Blackpool	Loan
18 June 2018	31 May 2019	(Scotland) Jason Holt	(England) Fleetwood Town	Loan
25 June 2018	6 January 2019 (Extended to 31 May 2019)	(Scotland) Ryan Hardie	(Scotland) Livingston	Loan
16 July 2018	31 December 2018	(Mexico) Eduardo Herrera	(Mexico) Santos Laguna	Loan
1 August 2018	6 January 2019	(Scotland) Kieran Wright	(Scotland) Raith Rovers	Loan
3 August 2018	7 January 2019	(Scotland) Aidan Wilson	(Scotland) Forfar Athletic	Loan
8 August 2018	31 May 2019	(Scotland) Greg Docherty	(England) Shrewsbury Town	Loan
15 August 2018	1 January 2019	(Scotland) Jamie Barjonas	(England) Bury	Loan
20 August 2018	31 May 2019	(Northern Ireland) Lee Hodson	(Scotland) St Mirren	Loan
21 August 2018	8 January 2019	(Malta) Myles Beerman	(Malta) Birkirkara	Loan
24 August 2018	31 May 2019	(Scotland) Liam Burt	(Scotland) Alloa Athletic	Loan
30 August 2018	6 January 2019 (Extended to 31 May 2019)	(England) Jak Alnwick	(England) Scunthorpe United	Loan
31 August 2018	6 January 2019 (Extended to 31 May 2019)	(Scotland) Zak Rudden	(Scotland) Falkirk	Loan
15 September 2018	6 January 2019 (Extended to 31 May 2019)	(Scotland) Kyle Bradley	(Scotland) Annan Athletic	Loan
8 January 2019	31 May 2019	(Mexico) Eduardo Herrera	(Mexico) Club Necaxa	Loan
23 January 2019	31 May 2019	(Malta) Myles Beerman	(Malta) Gżira United	Loan
25 January 2019	31 May 2019	(Scotland) Robby McCrorie	(Scotland) Greenock Morton	Loan
25 January 2019	31 May 2019	(Scotland) Andrew Dallas	(Scotland) Greenock Morton	Loan
29 January 2019	31 May 2019	(Scotland) Jamie Barjonas	(Scotland) Raith Rovers	Loan
31 January 2019	31 May 2019	(England) Jordan Rossiter	(England) Bury	Loan
21 February 2019	31 May 2019	(Scotland) Jordan Houston	(Scotland) Airdrieonians	Loan
4 April 2019	1 June 2019	(Finland) Serge Atakayi	(Finland) SJK	Loan

== See also ==
- List of Rangers F.C. seasons
