= Jonne Lindblom =

Finnish sports agent, born 1983

Personal information
- Date of birth: 30 May 1983 (age 43)
- Place of birth: Espoo, Finland

Managerial career
- Years: Team
- 2019–2020: KuPS (sporting director)

Jonne Lindblom (born 30 May 1983) is a Finnish football agent and a former sporting director.

== Career ==
After working as a player agent for over ten years, Lindblom was named the sporting director of Veikkausliiga club Kuopion Palloseura (KuPS) in September 2019. Approximately one year later, KuPS announced that the club will abolish their sporting director position for financial reasons, without referring to Lindblom directly.

As a player agent, Lindblom has represented many Finnish and foreign players over the years. Lindblom is credited of finding Alfredo Morelos to HJK Helsinki in 2016. Some Finnish players he has represented include Eero Markkanen, Petteri Forsell, Tommi Jyry and Ville Tikkanen. In May 2023, he was also part of the transfer process of Abdulfattah Asiri to Veikkausliiga club IFK Mariehamn, as the first Saudi player ever in Finnish football.
