= Alfredo Morelos =

Colombian footballer (born 1996)

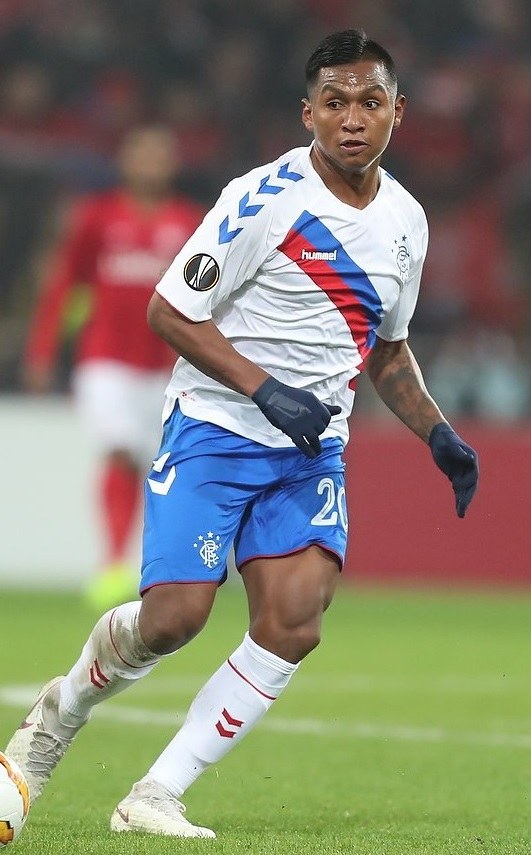
- Morelos with Rangers in 2018

Personal information
- Full name: Alfredo José Morelos Aviléz
- Date of birth: 21 June 1996 (age 30)
- Place of birth: Cereté, Colombia
- Height: 1.77 m (5 ft 10 in)
- Position: Striker

Team information
- Current team: Atlético Nacional
- Number: 9

Youth career
- 2011–2014: Independiente Medellín

Senior career*
Years	Team	Apps	(Gls)
2014–2016	Independiente Medellín	12	(1)
2016	→ HJK (loan)	30	(16)
2017	HJK	12	(11)
2017–2023	Rangers	178	(78)
2023–2026	Santos	20	(4)
2024–2026	→ Atlético Nacional (loan)	68	(23)
2026–	Atlético Nacional	33	(16)

International career^{‡}
2013	Colombia U17	4	(0)
2015	Colombia U20	6	(0)
2018–2021	Colombia	11	(1)
Medal record
Representing Colombia
U-20 South American Championship
Runner-up	2015 Uruguay
Copa América
Third place	2021 Brazil
- * Club domestic league appearances and goals as of 01:14, 8 November 2026 (GMT) ‡ National team caps and goals as of 01:14, 25 September 2026 (GMT)

Alfredo José Morelos Aviléz (born 21 June 1996) is a Colombian professional footballer who plays as a striker for Categoría Primera A club Atlético Nacional.

Morelos began his senior career with Independiente Medellín in his homeland before moving to Finland to play for Helsinki side HJK. In June 2017, he moved to Scotland to join Rangers, for a reported fee of £1 million. Morelos currently holds the club record for most goals scored in European competitions with 29 goals.

Morelos played youth international football for Colombia at under-17 and under-20 levels. He was a member of the under-20 team that were runners-up in the 2015 South American U-20 Championship. Morelos made his senior international debut for Colombia in 2018 and was part of the squad that finished third at the 2021 Copa América.

== Early life ==
Born in Cereté, Colombia, Morelos lived with his sisters, his parents and his grandmother, but after joining Independiente Medellín, he had to live away from his family. Morelos said in an interview with AS.com that he is married. While in Finland, Morelos said though it was tough to adapt to the country, as his family decided to stay in Colombia and he had to travel to South America to be with them. Morelos also revealed that it was his father who got him into football and goalscoring.

== Club career ==
=== Independiente Medellín ===
==== 2014 season ====
Morelos began his career at Independiente Medellín in 2011 at the age of 15 and worked his way through the academy ranks. He was promoted to the first team by then manager Hernán Darío Gómez, and made his first team debut aged 18 years and 22 days, in a 2–2 draw with Rionegro Águilas in the Copa Colombia group stage on 13 July 2014, coming on as a 74th-minute substitute.

On 24 July 2014, Morelos started his first game for Independiente Medellín and scored his first ever senior goal, aged 18 years, 1 month and 3 days in a 2–0 win over Evigado also in the Copa Colombia. Seven days later, he scored a brace in two minutes in a 3–2 win over Jaguares de Córdoba during a Copa Colombia group B match taking his tally to three goals in as many matches in the competition. Morelos featured three more times for Independiente Medellín in the group stage of the competition scoring a further two goals, one against Leones on 21 August 2014 in a 3–0 win and one seven days later against Evigado in a 1–1 draw. Independiente Medellín finished second in their group with 21 points, level on points with first placed Atlético Nacional and progressed through to the last 16 of the 2014 Copa Colombia but were defeated 5–2 on aggregate by Deportes Tolima; Morelos made an appearance in both legs of the tie.

Morelos made his Categoría Primera A debut for Independiente Medellín on 31 August 2014 in a 3–0 win over Águilas Doradas coming on as an 82nd-minute substitute. Six days later on 6 September 2014, Morelos scored his first Categoría Primera A goal for Independiente Medellín during injury time against Fortaleza Esporte Clube to win the match 3–2 in the 92nd minute. Morelos made a further four appearances in the 2014 Categoría Primera A but the goal against Fortaleza would be his last of the season.

Independiente Medellín finished runners-up to Independiente Santa Fe in the 2014 Finalización after losing the final 3–2 on aggregate, Morelos made an appearance in the second leg of the tie on 21 December 2014 coming on as a 66th-minute substitute in a 1–1 draw.

Morelos ended the 2014 season with fourteen appearances and six goals in all competitions for Independiente Medellín and received a 2014 Categoría Primera A Finalización runner-up medal.

==== 2015 season ====
Morelos made eleven appearances in all competitions in the 2015 season, six in the Categoría Primera A and five in the Copa Colombia but failed to find the net in any of the matches. Independiente Medellín reached the final of the Categoría Primera A 2015 Apertura but were defeated 2–1 on aggregate by Deportivo Cali with Morelos coming as a 68th-minute substitute in the second leg on 8 June 2015 which ended 1-1, earning Morelos his second runner-up medal.

In January 2016 it was reported in the Colombian media that Morelos was linked with a move away from Independiente Medellín to European side HJK Helsinki.

Morelos made a total of twenty five appearances for Independiente Medellín scoring six goals in all competitions during his time with the club.

=== HJK ===
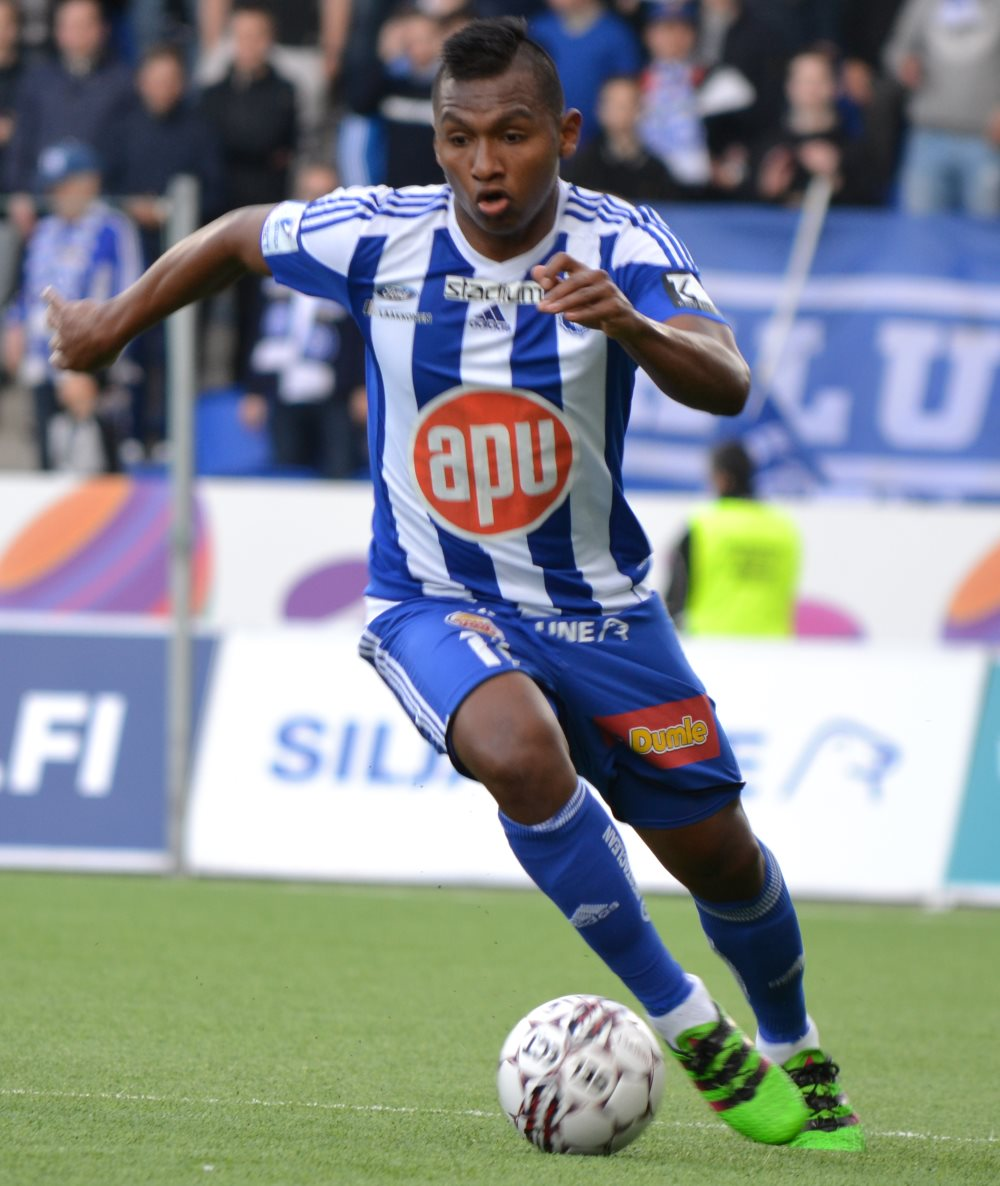
Morelos with HJK in 2017

==== 2016 season ====
On 5 February 2016, HJK announced the signing of Morelos, initially on a loan deal, with a contribution of a player agent Jonne Lindblom.

Morelos made an immediate impact on his debut four days later in the Finnish League Cup, coming on as a substitute in the Stadin derby against HIFK and scored in the 90th minute to make the game 3–3. A week later on 18 February 2016, Morelos scored a brace in the League Cup once again, in a 2–2 draw against Inter Turku. Morelos also made an impact in the league and started the season well scoring six goals in the first five matches against VPS, RoPS (twice), SJK and AC Kajaani (twice). Morelos would then not score for six matches before scoring against rivals HIFK in a 2–1 win on 26 May 2016, Morelos scored his first and only hat–trick for HJK and the first of his career aged 19 years, 11 months and 25 days in the Finnish Cup, in a 4–1 win over KuPS on 15 June 2016, he followed this up by scoring in a 3–2 win over SJK in the league three days later. Five days later, on 23 June 2016, he scored in the semi–final of the Finnish Cup, in a 3–0 win over Lahti to send them through to the final.

In the UEFA Europa League Qualifiers, Morelos scored four goals in six UEFA Europa League appearances against Atlantas (twice), Beroe Stara Zagora and IFK Göteborg all of which were in the first leg of each tie, HJK were defeated 3–2 on aggregate by IFK Göteborg after a 2–0 defeat away in the Third qualifying round and exited the competition. He then scored four more league goals by August against PK-35 Vantaa, FC Lahti, KuPS (twice) and scored against KuPS for the third time in another encounter weeks later on 28 August 2016. After scoring five goals in six league matches against PS Kemi, Lahti, RoPS, HIFK, and Mariehamn and scoring HJK's only goal in the final of the Finnish Cup against SJK which ended 1–1 after full-time (though the club lost 7–6 in the penalty shoot–out with Morlelos scoring his penalty), Morelos was named September Player of the Month. Morelos scored in the second last game of the season against title challengers, IFK Mariehamn, on 14 October 2016 which ended in a 1–1 draw. However, he was unable to help the club win the league after IFK Mariehamn won it by three points in the last game of the season after HJK drew 0–0 with SJK and IFK Mariehamn defeated Ilves 2–1.

At the end of the 2016 season, Morelos finished HJK's top goal scorer in the league with sixteen goals in thirty appearances and top goal scorer in all competitions with thirty goals in forty three appearances, he was also runner-up top goalscorer in the league missing out on the top spot by one goal to Roope Riski who finished the season with seventeen goals. Morelos earned a Veikkausliiga runner-up medal, a Finnish Cup runner-up medal and was awarded the league's best striker of the year award.

==== 2017 season ====
HJK took up their option to sign Morelos permanently for a fee of €500.000, and he started 2017 by scoring in the first game of the season in a 3–2 victory over FC Honka on 28 January 2017 in the Finnish Cup group stage. He followed this up by scoring three goals in the remaining four group games against KTP, GrlFK, and HIFK. The latter being in a 4–0 win over HJK's Derby rivals on 1 March 2017, which was HJK's biggest win over HIFK since 1984 when they beat HIFK 9–1 in the Finnish Cup. Morelos helped HJK finish top of their group with five wins out of five and progress through to the Quarter-final. On 1 April 2017 Morelos scored the only goal in the 75th minute in a 1–0 victory over Ilves in the Finnish Cup Semi-final to send HJK into the final and take his tally up to five goals in seven cup matches.

Morelos got off the mark in his first 2017 Veikkausliiga league match on 5 April 2017 when he scored in a 5–0 win over VPS, five days later Morelos scored in a 2–0 victory over KuPS. Between 23 April 2017 and 19 May 2017 Morelos would score six goals over five consecutive matches against JJK, Inter Turku, VPS, Ilves (twice), and PS Kemi. Morelos would not score in HJK's next two games which both ended as 0–0 draws against HIFK and Lahti, then scored a brace on 31 May 2017 in a 6–0 win over SJK. For his excellent form and goalscoring which included ten goals in eleven appearances Morelos was awarded the Veikkausliiga Player of the month for both April 2017 and May 2017. Morelos scored his final goal for HJK in his last match for the club before his transfer to Rangers on 4 June 2017 in a 4–1 victory over RoPS.

Despite leaving halfway through the Finnish season Morelos finished as HJK's second top goalscorer for the 2017 season after he scored eleven league goals in twelve appearances, five cup goals in seven appearances and sixteen goals over nineteen appearances in all competitions and was joint-seventh top goalscorer in the 2017 Veikkausliiga. HJK went on to win the 2017 Veikkausliiga by twenty points and the 2016–17 Finnish Cup defeating SJK 1–0 in the final on 23 September 2017 with Morelos receiving two winners medals for his contributions over the season.

Morelos made a total of 62 appearances for HJK scoring 46 goals, he won three player of the month awards, one striker of the year award and two trophies during his time at the club.

=== Rangers ===
==== 2017–18 season ====
Morelos signed a three-year deal with Rangers on 19 June 2017 for an undisclosed fee, which was widely reported to be €1.2 million plus add-ons.

He made his debut for Rangers in a 1–0 home win against Progrès Niederkorn in the Europa League first qualifying round first leg ten days later, coming on in the 77th minute in place of Martyn Waghorn. On 9 August, Morelos scored his first two Rangers goals in a 6–0 win over Dunfermline Athletic also at Ibrox in the second round of the Scottish League Cup. Three days later he scored his first goal in the Scottish Premiership, heading the team into an early lead in a 3–2 home loss to Hibernian. He quickly became a favourite with Rangers supporters, who nicknamed him El Bufalo.

He finished the season with 18 goals, tied (with Josh Windass) as the club's top scorer for the season; 14 of those strikes were in the league, the second-highest total behind Kris Boyd of Kilmarnock.

==== 2018–19 season ====
Rangers started the season playing in the UEFA Europa League qualifying rounds, and goals against NK Osijek and NK Maribor from Morelos helped Rangers progress to the group stages of the tournament. However, a sign of future disciplinary issues arose when he was sent off against Aberdeen at Pittodrie Stadium in the opening league fixture for a kick out at an opponent, although the red card was rescinded on appeal. He continued to score goals early in the season; scoring in 2–0 win over St Mirren in the league, and netting a hat trick in a 3–1 win over Kilmarnock in the League Cup. In September 2018 he signed a new contract with Rangers, until 2022. After several games without a goal, he resumed his goalscoring form on 26 September 2018 when he netted Rangers second goal in a 5–1 win over St Johnstone. Morelos then went on to score 10 goals in the next 13 games, including a brace in a 3–1 win over Rapid Vienna in the Europa League.

On 6 February 2019, Morelos scored twice in a 4–2 victory away at Aberdeen but also received his fourth red card of the season and his third against the same rival opposition (one was later rescinded). Manager Steven Gerrard stated that he was trying to help the player, and the club appealed the latest red card from the Aberdeen game. The appeal was unsuccessful, but Morelos was able to play in a Scottish Cup tie while serving a three-match League ban, and scored four goals in that match, a 5–0 win over Kilmarnock, to take his tally for the 2018–19 campaign to 27 in 39 appearances.

In March 2019 he signed a new contract with Rangers, his second of the 2018–19 season, until 2023. Later that month, Morelos received a straight red card for an incident with Celtic's Scott Brown in an eventual 2–1 loss for Rangers in the Old Firm derby; it was his fifth sending off of the season, although one of them was rescinded. Following the incident, manager Steven Gerrard said he could no longer defend the player. Despite then serving a four-match suspension, Morelos finished as the top goalscorer in the 2018–19 Scottish Premiership with 18 league goals. His goal against Kilmarnock in the last league match of the season was his 100th competitive goal at club level.

==== 2019–20 season ====
During the summer of 2019 Morelos turned down a lucrative contract offer from Chinese Super League side Hebei China Fortune worth £30 million that would have seen the Colombian net £10 million per year before tax, the fee believed to be offered to Rangers was over £15 million although no official bid was received. Morelos started the 2019–20 season by scoring a goal against St Joseph's F.C. in the first leg of their Europa League First Qualifying round tie in Gibraltar. He followed this up in the return leg at Ibrox, by scoring his third hat-trick for Rangers. He then scored a goal and made two assists against FC Midtjylland in the Europa League Third Qualifying round. Three days later he came on as a substitute in the 76th minute during Rangers' first home league game of the season against Hibernian and scored a brace in a 6–1 victory, taking his tally to 7 goals in 7 games for the season.

In October 2019, Morelos was allegedly racially abused by Hearts fans after he scored during a match between the two sides. At the end of November, he scored twice in a 2–2 draw away at Feyenoord in the Europa League. In scoring these goals, Morelos became the first Rangers player to score in four consecutive matches in European competition. After the game, manager Gerrard praised Morelos and highlighted his improved disciplinary record over the season to date.

Over the course of a week in December, Morelos failed to score from several chances (including a penalty) as Rangers lost the 2019 Scottish League Cup Final 1–0 to Celtic, struck his side's goal in a 1–1 draw with BSC Young Boys which ensured qualification for the 2019–20 UEFA Europa League knockout phase, and netted the winner in a league match away to Motherwell, but was then sent off for a second booking after making gestures to the home supporters during his celebrations. Morelos, however, found himself again the centre of controversy at the end of Rangers' 2–1 league win over Celtic at Parkhead on 29 December. He was sent off for diving, and made some gestures with his hand across his throat as he left the field. Rangers later claimed he had been subjected to racist abuse from Celtic supporters at the game.

By the time of the mid-season break at the end of December, Morelos had scored 28 goals in 35 games. He also set a UEFA individual record for most goals in a European campaign before Christmas, with 14.

==== 2020–21 season ====
Despite much speculation that Morelos would leave Rangers and a £16 million bid from Lille which if accepted would have been a record transfer fee received by Rangers, he remained with the club for the 2020–21 season. He started the season in goalscoring form, netting five in his first seven games including braces against St Mirren in the Scottish Premiership and Lincoln Red Imps during Europa League qualifying. After scoring his fifth goal of the season against Hibernian on 20 September 2020, Morelos would not find the net again in domestic competitions until 30 December when he scored against St Mirren. He continued his rich vein of form in the group stage of the Europa League by scoring against both Polish side Lech Poznań on 29 October 2020, and Portuguese giants Benfica on 5 November. By scoring the latter goal at the Estádio da Luz, Morelos surpassed Ally McCoist as Rangers top goalscorer in European competitions, holding the club record with 22 goals.

Morelos scored his first goals of 2021, netting a brace on 10 January during a 2–1 league win away to Aberdeen. On 27 January 2021, he played and scored the only goal in a 1–0 Premiership win over Hibernian at Easter Road. His performance proved controversial due to an off the ball incident where he appeared to stamp on Hibernian player Ryan Porteous, and was subsequently given a three match ban. On 21 February, he scored a bizarre goal during a league match against Dundee United as a clearance from United's goalkeeper Benjamin Siegrist rebounded off Morelos's body into the goal. He followed this up four days later with a goal in the Europa League Round of 32 match against Royal Antwerp. On 21 March, he scored his first goal in the Old Firm derby during a 1–1 draw away at Celtic Park; later reports emerged that he was the subject of racial abuse over social media perpetrated by alleged opposition fans. With three goals in three appearances, Morelos ended March 2021 by being named Scottish Premiership Player of the Month. On 2 May, Morelos scored against Celtic again in a 4–1 win at Ibrox, which was a biggest margin of victory against their rivals in 14 years and ensured that Rangers stayed unbeaten against Celtic in all league matches for the first time since the 1999–2000 season.

This would be Morelos's final goal of the season but he played a part in the final two fixtures, a 3–0 away win against Livingston on 12 May where he provided an assist and a 4–0 home win against Aberdeen on 15 May which meant that Rangers completed the full Scottish Premiership season unbeaten in addition to winning the top tier title for the first time in 10 years and 55th time overall. Morelos won his first trophy after four seasons with the club. He ended the season with 17 goals in 44 appearances in all competitions.

==== 2021–22 season ====
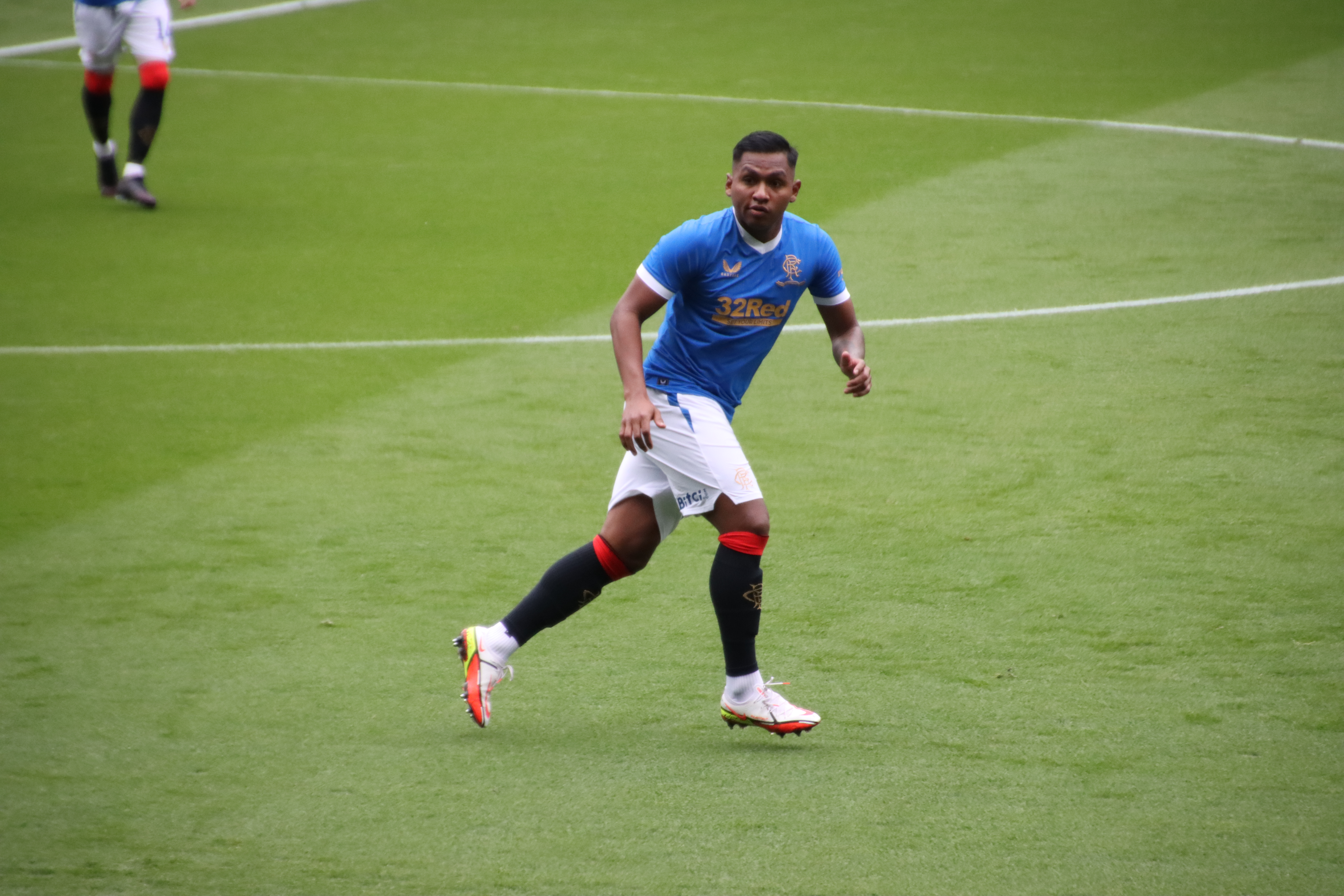
Morelos in a match against Celtic in August 2021.

Again there was much speculation over the summer transfer window that Morelos would leave Rangers; the club rejected a £10 million bid from Porto (against whom Morelos had scored twice in the previous year's Europa League group stage). Morelos stayed a Rangers player but missed the first two matches of the season after being called up to the Colombia national side for the 2021 Copa América. On 10 August 2021, he scored his first goal of the season and his first ever UEFA Champions League goal in the second leg of Rangers Third qualifying round match against Malmö FF. He became the first Rangers player to score a Champions League goal for ten years – the last also came against Malmö; despite this Rangers lost the tie 4–2 on aggregate and dropped into the UEFA Europa League Play-off. On 19 August, Morelos scored the only goal over two legs against Alashkert in the Europa League Play-off round to help Rangers reach the Europa League group stage for the fourth consecutive season. Three days later Morelos scored his first league goal of the season in a 4–2 away win over Ross County, a game in which he also recorded an assist.

Morelos would not score again for a month until a 2–0 win over Livingston on 22 September 2021 at Ibrox in the quarter-final of the Scottish League Cup. A few weeks later on 3 October he scored the winning goal in a 2–1 league win over Hibernian. On 24 October 2021 he again scored the winner against St Mirren as Rangers came behind to score twice in as many minutes and win 2–1. In doing so Morelos scored his 100th goal for Rangers in his 199th match for the club, he celebrated by jumping into the crowd which he received a yellow card for. He became the first player to score 100 goals for Rangers in over five years and the 18th post-war player to do so, with Kenny Miller being the last player to achieve this in 2016. Three days later Morelos marked his 200th appearance for the club by scoring his 101st goal against Aberdeen in a 2–2 draw at Ibrox.

On 25 November 2021, in their first match under new manager Giovanni van Bronckhorst, Rangers defeated Sparta Prague 2–0 in the Europa League group stage at Ibrox; Morelos, who had not scored in the previous four group matches, got both goals to ensure their head-to-head record was superior to their opponents (who had won 1–0 in the Czech Republic) and secured qualification for the knockout stages of the competition for the third season in a row. Under van Bronckhorst Morelos looked like a rejuvenated player and hit a rich vein of form in the month of December scoring a further 4 goals in 5 league matches against Dundee, Hearts, St Johnstone and St Mirren. The latter of which broke another Rangers record as Morelos scored his 107th goal for the club and became the all-time overseas top goalscorer, a record which was previously held by South African left winger Johnny Hubbard since 1959. For his form and goalscoring Morelos ended the year on a high by winning the player of the month award for December 2021.

Morelos scored his first goals of 2022 by netting a brace against Hearts on 6 February at Ibrox during a 5–0 win, a game in which he also recorded an assist. The two goals took Morelos league goals tally up to 10 for the season and he became the first player to score double figures in the Scottish Premiership for Rangers for 5 consecutive seasons since Kris Boyd between 2005/06 and 2009/10. Three days later Morelos scored in a 2–0 home win over Hibernian. On 17 February, Morelos scored a goal and caused an own goal with his shot deflecting off of Dan-Axel Zagadou as Rangers recorded a historic 4–2 European away win over German giants and favourites to win the tournament Borussia Dortmund at the Westfalenstadion in the first leg of the 2021–22 UEFA Europa League knockout round play-offs. Rangers progressed through to the last 16 of the Europa League following a 6–4 aggregate win over Dortmund and were drawn against Serbian side Red Star Belgrade, in the first leg at Ibrox on 10 March Morelos scored in a 3–0 win. Morelos season was cut short with his final appearance being in a 2–1 away win over Dundee on 20 March after he sustained an injury whilst on International duty which required him to undergo surgery on his thigh. On 5 April Rangers put out an official statement on their website to confirm the surgery was a success but Morelos would be out for the rest of the season.

Despite his injury Morelos would finish the season as Rangers joint-top goalscorer with 18 goals (tied with James Tavernier) in 42 appearances and received the award for Rangers Player Of The Year, he was also included in the 2021-22 PFA Scotland Team of the Year. Without Morelos Rangers reached the Europa League Final which they narrowly lost to Eintracht Frankfurt 5–4 on penalties at the Ramón Sánchez Pizjuán Stadium in Seville after the two sides could not be separated after 120 minutes. Although Morelos never took part in the final he received a runners-up medal for his earlier contributions in the European campaign which included vital goals for Rangers to be able progress to that stage in the tournament. Before the match Morelos was spotted in the streets of Seville taking pictures and interacting with fans who had travelled over in large numbers for the occasion.

==== 2022–23 season ====
After almost five months out of action Morelos made his return on 6 August 2022 in a league game against newly promoted side Kilmarnock at Ibrox coming as a 64th-minute substitute for Antonio Čolak, 14 minutes later Morelos scored his first goal of the season as Rangers won the match 2–0. On 20 August 2022 during a 2–2 draw with Hibs, Morelos received his eighth red card for Rangers after he swung his arm in the face of Marijan Čabraja when both players went to head the ball. The commentators and pundits felt the red card was harsh and it meant that Rangers had to finish the game with nine men as John Lundstram had just been sent off nine minutes prior to the incident. Following this manager Giovanni van Bronckhorst took the decision to drop Morelos from the squad to face PSV Eindhoven in the Champions League Play-off round (which Rangers went on to win 3–2 on aggregate and qualify for the Champions League group stage for the first time in 12 years) citing concerns over his attitude and fitness levels but stressed that Morelos still had a future at the club if he could prove his commitment. Morelos made his first start for Rangers in six months and his first ever Champions League group stage appearance on 14 September 2022 in a 3–0 defeat against Napoli at Ibrox. On 1 October 2022, Morelos scored his second goal of the season, 13 minutes after coming on as a 63rd-minute substitute in a 4–0 win over Hearts at Tynecastle. On 29 October 2022, Morelos again scored after coming on as substitute in a 4–1 victory over Aberdeen at Ibrox, the goal took his tally up to 115 for Rangers and meant that he became the 30th all-time top goalscorer for the club (level with Rangers legend Mark Hateley).

In May 2023, Rangers announced Morelos would depart the club upon the expiration of his contract.

=== Santos ===
On 4 September 2023, Campeonato Brasileiro Série A club Santos announced the signing of Morelos on a two-year contract. He made his debut for the club eleven days later, replacing Marcos Leonardo late into a 3–0 home loss to Cruzeiro.

Morelos suffered a calf injury in October 2023, which sidelined him for nearly two months. He accepted a wage reduction in January 2024, following the club's first-ever relegation to the Campeonato Brasileiro Série B, and scored his first goal on 14 February, netting through a penalty kick in a 1–0 Campeonato Paulista away win over São Paulo.

Despite being regularly used in the 2024 Campeonato Paulista as Peixe finished runners-up, Morelos was separated from the first team squad in April, with president Marcelo Teixeira stating that the decision was due to "technical reasons". After not being called up to the opening round of the 2024 Série B, he returned to the squad after losing weight and as starter Julio Furch was injured.

Despite scoring twice (against Guarani and Brusque) in May 2024, Morelos was again separated from the squad in June, after becoming a third-choice behind Furch and Willian.

=== Atlético Nacional ===
==== 2024 Season ====
On 18 July 2024, Santos announced Morelos' loan to Atlético Nacional back in his home country, until the end of the year.

He made his debut on 25 July 2024 in a Categoría Primera A league match against Millonarios coming on as a 73rd-minute substitute for Kevin Viveros. Nine minutes later he won a penalty for his side when he was fouled in the box which was converted by Edwin Cardona to give Atlético a 2–1 lead. After the penalty was scored Morelos made a gesture during his celebration that sparked fury from the home fans and Milonarios coaching staff and nearly caused a riot, three members of the Milonarios coaching staff were sent off during a free-for-all. After the match Morelos played down the situation during an interview by stating "I made a gesture of celebration and their fans took it the wrong way, but I have nothing against the Millonarios fans. It was always in favour of Atletico Nacional."

He scored his first league goal for Atlético on 10 August 2024 during a 3–1 victory over Patriotas He scored his first Copa Colombia goal on 24 September 2024 in a 1–1 draw with Alianza. Morelos would establish himself in the first team during his loan stay scoring in a 6–2 league victory over Boyacá Chicó on 24 September 2024. In October 2024 he scored four goals in two games against Envigado and Jaguares de Córdoba. In December 2024 Atletico found themselves 3 points behind Millonarios with two games to go in the Categoría Primera A Finalización Semi-final, Morelos scored in the final two games during a 2–1 victory over Deportivo Pasto and a 3–1 victory over Independiente Santa Fe as Millonarios drew their final two games to send Atletico into the final. Afterwards Nacional president Sebastian Arango Botero admitted the club were desperate to turn his loan deal from the Brazilian club into a permanent deal saying "Alfredo’s contract here expires on December 31. I have told him and I say it publicly, that we want to continue counting on him. He is a great person, with who we have a great relationship. We would like to be able to extend his stay at Nacional especially now that we are going to return to an international tournament next year. It is not a simple operation with Santos, but we hope to be able to achieve it." On 13 December 2024, Morelos scored in the Copa Colombia final first leg during a 3–1 victory over rivals América de Cali to take his tally to four goals in six cup games, two days later he played in the second leg as the teams drew 0–0 with Atletico winning the Copa Colombia final 3–1 on aggregate and handing Morelos his first ever trophy in his homeland. On 22 December 2024, he scored the first goal in a 2–0 victory over Deportes Tolima in the Categoría Primera A Finalización final second leg after the 1st leg ended in a 0–0 draw three days prior as Atletico won their second piece of silverware for the season and 18th league title overall.

==== 2025 Season ====
On 29 January 2025, Morelos completed another loan move back to Atlético Nacional until the end of the 2025 season with the Colombian club having the option to buy for £2.5 million. Three days later he made his first start of the season during a 1–0 away victory over La Equidad a game in which five players were sent off. On 7 February 2025, he was part of the squad that won the 2025 Superliga Colombiana after playing 70 minutes of the second leg as Atlético Nacional defeated Atlético Bucaramanga 4–3 in a penalty shoot-out after the teams drew 1–1 on aggregate. On 10 February 2025, he scored his first goal of the season when he converted a penalty during a 3–0 victory over Deportivo Pereira. On 23 February 2025, he scored his first goal from open play in a 3–2 defeat to Alianza. On 10 March 2025, Morelos scored the only goal on the stroke of half time as Atlético defeated América de Cali 1–0 in the Apertura league phase. On 20 March, he scored in a 4–3 victory over Deportes Tolima. Three days later he received his first red card since leaving Rangers in the 90th–minute of the El Clásico Paisa during a 1–1 draw for pushing over an opponent.

On 4 April 2025, Morelos made his Copa Libertadores debut and scored his first goal in the competition during a 3–0 victory over Uruguayan side Club Nacional de Football in the group stage of the tournament.

==== 2026 Season ====
Following his successful loan spell at Atlético Nacional the club president Sebastian Arango declared their desire to keep the player beyond his loan. He said: "We are negotiating with Santos. We want him to stay and Alfredo wants to stay with us." Despite this Santos rejected a bid in the region of £2 million from Atlético for Morelos who they valued at £5 million. Morelos claimed he was owed £958,000 in unpaid wages and bonuses and started proceedings to take FIFA to resolve the matter. After weeks of negotiations involving the clubs and legal representatives, a resolution was reached permitting Morelos' free transfer, provided he relinquish his claim. On 20 January 2026, Morelos signed for Atlético Nacional on a three-year contract.

== International career ==
=== Youth ===
Morelos was called up by the Colombia under-17 team for the first time in July 2012 and made his under-17 debut in a 1–1 draw against Paraguay on 2 April 2013. He went on to make four appearances for the under-17 side. In September 2014, Morelos was called up by the Colombia under-20 team for the first time and made his under-20 debut on 16 January 2015, in a 1–0 win against Uruguay. Morelos was in the Colombia squad when they finished runner's-up in the 2015 South American Youth Football Championship. He played six games in total for the under-20 team.

=== Senior ===
On 28 August 2018, Morelos received his first call-up to the Colombian senior national team for the friendly matches against Venezuela and Argentina. He made his international debut on 8 September 2018, coming on as a 77th-minute substitute against Venezuela. In the last minute he provided an assist for Yimmi Chará's winning goal for Colombia. He made a further two appearances in March 2019 in friendlies against Japan and South Korea, making his first international start against the latter side. He was not named in the 40-man preliminary squad announced on 16 May for the 2019 Copa América, with several media outlets speculating his poor on-field discipline at club level in Scotland contributed to his omission.

Morelos returned to the national side in October 2019 and featured in friendlies against Chilie and Algeria. Morelos scored his first international goal on 16 November 2019, in a friendly during injury time against Peru as Colombia won 1–0. Four days later he played 45 minutes in another friendly against Ecuador.

On 10 October 2020, Morelos played his first ever FIFA World Cup qualification game for Colombia coming on as a substitute in the 59th minute as Colombia defeated Venezuela 3–0. He made two more appearances in the qualifiers during 2020; one against Chile on 14 October and the other against Uruguay on 13 November.

Morelos was selected in the 28-man Colombia squad for the 2021 Copa América which took place in June 2021, but missed the warm up World Cup qualifier games against Peru and Argentina after he tested positive for corona virus during a routine round of testing whilst on international duty. Morelos made his Copa América debut on 21 June 2021, coming on as an 81st-minute substitute in a group game against Peru which Colombia lost 2–1. Colombia progressed through their group and reached the knockout stages of the tournament but were eventually defeated in the Semi-final by Argentina 4–3 on penalties. Morelos was an unused substitute in Colombia's final game against Peru in the Third place play-off which Colombia won 3–2 after a dramatic 25 metre goal during injury time by Luis Diaz which secured Colombia Third place at the 2021 Copa América and earned Morelos a bronze medal.

== Personal life ==
Morelos has been with his childhood sweetheart Yesenia Herrera since 2014, the couple married in January 2016 and have a daughter together Leonela Morelos who was born in May 2020.

In October 2024, Morelos was involved in a traffic accident, after hitting a motorcyclist with his SUV; he also failed a breathalyzer test, and was subsequently arrested for drink-driving.

== Career statistics ==
=== Club ===
As of match played 9 November 2026

Appearances and goals by club, season and competition
Club	Season	League			National cup (Note: Includes Finnish Cup, Scottish Cup, Copa Colombia)		League cup (Note: Includes Finnish League Cup, Scottish League Cup, Superliga Colombiana)		Continental (Note: Includes UEFA Champions League, Europa League, Copa Libertadores, Copa Sudamericana)		State league (Note: Includes Campeonato Paulista)		Total	
Club	Season	Division	Apps	Goals	Apps	Goals	Apps	Goals	Apps	Goals	Apps	Goals	Apps	Goals
Independiente Medellín	2014	Categoría Primera A	6	1	8	5	—		—		—		14	6
Independiente Medellín	2015	Categoría Primera A	6	0	5	0	—		—		—		11	0
Independiente Medellín	Total		12	1	13	5	—		—		—		25	6
HJK (loan)	2016	Veikkausliiga	30	16	4	7	3	3	6 (Note: Appearances in UEFA Europa League)	4	—		43	30
HJK	2017	Veikkausliiga	12	11	7	5	—		—		—		19	16
Rangers	2017–18	Scottish Premiership	35	14	3	2	3	2	2	0	—		43	18
Rangers	2018–19	Scottish Premiership	30	18	3	4	2	4	13	4	—		48	30
Rangers	2019–20	Scottish Premiership	26	12	1	1	3	2	17	14	—		47	29
Rangers	2020–21	Scottish Premiership	29	12	2	0	0	0	13	5	—		44	17
Rangers	2021–22	Scottish Premiership	26	11	1	0	3	1	12 (Note: One appearance and one goal in UEFA Champions League, eleven appearances and five goals in UEFA Europa League)	6	—		42	18
Rangers	2022–23	Scottish Premiership	32	11	4	0	3	1	6 (Note: Appearances in UEFA Champions League)	0	—		45	12
Rangers	Total		178	78	14	7	14	10	63	29	—		269	124
Santos	2023	Série A	3	0	—		—		—		—		3	0
Santos	2024	Série B	6	2	—		—		—		11	2	17	4
Santos	Total		9	2	—		—		—		11	2	20	4
Atlético Nacional	2024	Categoría Primera A	22	7	6	4	0	0	0	0	—		28	11
Atlético Nacional	2025	Categoría Primera A	46	16	9	3	1	0	8 (Note: Appearances in Copa Libertadores)	2	—		64	21
Atlético Nacional	2026	Categoría Primera A	33	16	2	2	0	0	1 (Note: Appearances in Copa Sudamericana)	0	—		36	18
Atlético Nacional	Total		101	39	17	9	1	0	9	2	—		128	50
Career total			341	147	55	33	18	13	77	35	11	2	514	230

=== International ===
As of match played 20 June 2021

Appearances and goals by national team and year
National team	Year	Apps	Goals
Colombia	2018	1	0
Colombia	2019	6	1
Colombia	2020	3	0
Colombia	2021	1	0
Total		11	1

As of match played 20 June 2021
Scores and results list Colombia's goal tally first, score column indicates score after each Morelos goal.

List of international goals scored by Alfredo Morelos
No.	Date	Venue	Cap	Opponent	Score	Result	Competition
1	16 November 2019	Hard Rock Stadium, Miami Gardens, United States	6	Peru	1–0	1–0	Friendly

== Honours ==
Independiente Medellin

- Categoría Primera A runner-up: 2014 Finalización, 2015 Apertura

HJK

- Veikkausliiga: 2017
- Finnish Cup: 2016–17

Rangers

- Scottish Premiership: 2020–21
- Scottish Cup: 2021–22
- Scottish League Cup runner-up: 2019–20, 2022–23
- UEFA Europa League runner-up: 2021–22

Santos

- Campeonato Brasileiro Série B: 2024
- Campeonato Paulista runner-up: 2024

Atlético Nacional

- Categoría Primera A: 2024 Finalización
- Copa Colombia: 2024, 2025
- Superliga Colombiana: 2025

Colombia U20

- U-20 South American Championship runner-up: 2015

Colombia

- Copa América third place: 2021

Individual

- Veikkausliiga Striker of the Year: 2016
- Veikkausliiga Team of the Year: 2016
- Veikkausliiga Player of the Month: September 2016, April 2017, May 2017
- Rangers Player of the Year: 2018–19 2021–22
- Rangers Players' Player of the Year: 2018–19
- Rangers Top scorer: 2017–18, 2018–19, 2019–20, 2021–22 (Note: Finished joint-top goalscorer alongside James Tavernier at the end of the 2021–22 season with both players scoring 18 goals but Morelos received the Sam English bowl for top goalscorer at Rangers annual awards)
- Scottish Premiership Top scorer: 2018–19
- PFA Scotland Team of the Year: 2018–19 Scottish Premiership, 2020–21 Scottish Premiership, 2021–22 Scottish Premiership
- Scottish Premiership Player of the Month: September 2019, March 2021 December 2021

Records

- UEFA Most goals scored in a European season before Christmas: 14 (during 2019–20 season)
- UEFA Cup / UEFA Europa League 3rd All-time top goalscorer: 32
- Scottish Premiership Most consecutive games scored in: 7 (during 2018–19 season, tied with David Clarkson)
- Rangers All-time European top goalscorer: 29
- Rangers All-time Overseas top goalscorer: 124
- Rangers Most consecutive European games scored in: 5 (during 2019–20 season)
- Rangers Most consecutive games scored in: 7 (during the 2018–19 season)
