= Mark Waller (doctor) =

British football club doctor

- Born: 3 July 1957 (age 68); Northampton
- Occupation: Club doctor
- Employer: Rangers

Mark Waller (born 3 July 1957 in Northampton) is the Head of Medical and Performance of Al Ain FC.

He was previously the doctor for the England Under-21 team, Liverpool, Aston Villa, Hull City and Leicester City. He has also served as a FA representative on the British Olympic Association Medical Committee and worked as a lecturer on sports injuries.

== Early life ==
Waller first went to Liverpool in the 1970s as a medical student, soon becoming a Liverpool fan. Specialising in emergency medicine, he developed an interest in sports injuries.

== Career ==
=== Liverpool ===
He joined Liverpool to oversee first team medical matters in 1993, but he is not a full-time employee of the club until later that decade. Waller was responsible for the medical care of all the first team squad, including treatment and prevention of injuries.

In October 2001, Waller with the then physio Dave Galley both diagnosed the seriousness of Gérard Houllier's chest pains during the half time interval during the 2001 Liverpool game against Leeds United, which eventually led to an emergency operation on Houllier's heart. Houllier was giving a half-time team talk when he felt pains in his chest. Waller was treating striker Emile Heskey when Houllier asked for help. During the incident, Houllier stated: "Don't worry. He is worth more money than me, but I am more urgent". Waller took his blood pressure and immediately called an ambulance. Houllier was then transferred by ambulance to the accident and emergency department of Royal Liverpool University Hospital. Prompt recognition of the problem and emergency surgery probably saved Houllier's life.

In October 2004, he was instrumental in overseeing the recovery of Djibril Cissé after the player sustained a broken leg during a match at Blackburn Rovers, an injury that could have cost Cissé his leg. Waller chose to "grab the leg and manipulate it", rather than spend "an hour or two getting to the hospital." The following year he oversaw Mohamed Sissoko's fast recovery from an eye injury following the Benfica UEFA Champions League away match in 2005. Waller refused to accept the initial expert diagnosis that Sissoko would never play again after the injury, despite the midfielder being "blind in his right eye for 36 hours." Sissoko was instead flown home the day after the match and placed under the care of the St Paul's eye unit in Royal Liverpool University Hospital.

=== After Liverpool ===
After leaving Liverpool, Waller worked as Medical Director at Al Jazira in United Arab Emirates, before returning to the United Kingdom to work under Gérard Houllier at Aston Villa in 2010. Thereafter, Waller left Villa with Houllier in June 2011 and joined Hull City in 2013 as first team doctor.

=== Rangers ===
Waller was appointed as the new Club Doctor of Scottish Premiership side Rangers in July 2018 to work alongside former Liverpool midfielder Steven Gerrard.

=== Leicester City ===
Waller joined Leicester City in June 2022.

=== Return to Rangers ===
Waller returned to Rangers on 23 June 2023. Aller left Rangers in June 2025.

=== Al Nin ===
Waller joined Emirate of Abu Dhabi club Al Ain FC in June 2025.
