= Jordan Houston (footballer) =

Scottish footballer

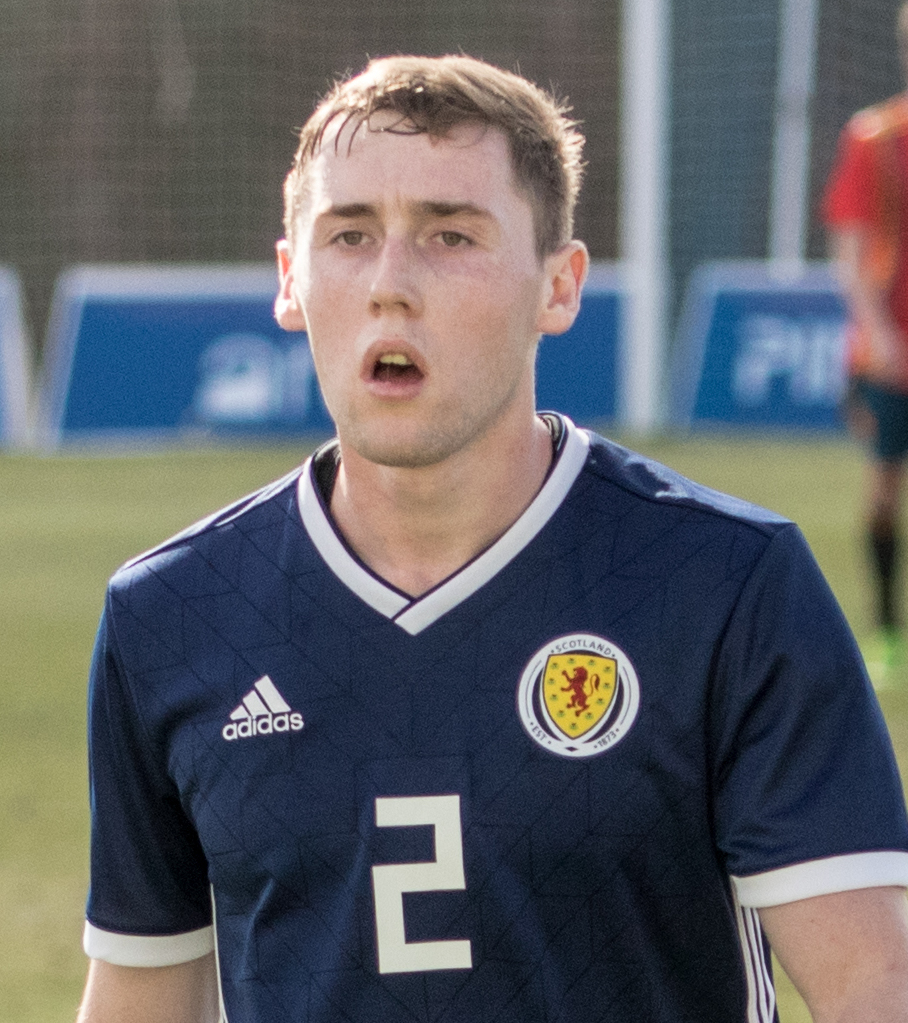
- Houston with Scotland U19, 2019

Personal information
- Full name: Jordan Iain Houston
- Date of birth: 28 January 2000 (age 26)
- Place of birth: East Kilbride, Scotland
- Height: 1.82 m (5 ft 11 1/2 in)
- Position: Defender

Youth career
- Rangers

Senior career*
Years	Team	Apps	(Gls)
2018–2020	Rangers	0	(0)
2019	→ Airdrieonians (loan)	4	(0)
2019–2020	→ Ayr United (loan)	24	(0)
2020–2023	Ayr United	62	(1)
2023–2024	Queen of the South	10	(1)
2024–2025	Clyde	16	(0)
2025	Haka	19	(2)
2026	Waterford	21	(0)

International career^{‡}
2017	Scotland U17	8	(0)
2018	Scotland U19	5	(0)
- * Club domestic league appearances and goals as of 9 November 2026 ‡ National team caps and goals as of 3 July 2025

Jordan Iain Houston (born 28 January 2000) is a Scottish footballer who plays as a defender. Houston has previously played for Rangers, Airdrieonians, Ayr United, Queen of the South, Clyde, Haka and Waterford and has also represented Scotland in youth international matches.

== Career ==
Houston signed a two-year contract with Rangers on 17 July 2018, keeping him with the club until the summer of 2020. Houston made his professional debut for Rangers when he came on as a substitute in a Scottish Cup win over Cowdenbeath on 30 January 2019. He was loaned to League One club Airdrieonians in February 2019.

Houston was loaned to Championship club Ayr United on 30 August 2019. Houston moved to the Honest Men on a permanent basis in January 2020.

On 5 June 2023, Houston signed a one-year contract with Queen of the South.

After a stint with Clyde, Houston signed with Haka in Finland in January 2025. After the first part of the league's regular season, Houston had a successful passing rate of only a bit over 60 per cent.

On 22 February 2026, Houston signed for League of Ireland Premier Division club Waterford. He made 24 appearances in all competitions during his season with the club before it was announced in November 2026 that he would not be retained for 2027.

== International career ==
Houston has also represented Scotland in under-17 and under-19 internationals.

== Career statistics ==
As of match played on 19 October 2026

Appearances and goals by club, season and competition
Club	Season	League			National Cup (Note: Includes Scottish Cup, Suomen Cup & FAI Cup)		League cup (Note: Includes Scottish League Cup and Finnish League Cup)		Continental		Other		Total	
Club	Season	Division	Apps	Goals	Apps	Goals	Apps	Goals	Apps	Goals	Apps	Goals	Apps	Goals
Rangers	2016–17	Scottish Premiership	0	0	0	0	0	0	0	0	0	0	0	0
Rangers	2018–19	Scottish Premiership	0	0	1	0	0	0	0	0	0	0	1	0
Rangers	Total		0	0	1	0	0	0	0	0	0	0	1	0
Rangers B	2017–18	–	–								1 (Note: Appearance(s) in Scottish Challenge Cup)	0	1	0
Rangers B	2018–19	–	–								1	0	1	0
Rangers B	2019–20	–	–								2	0	2	0
Rangers B	Total		–								4	0	4	0
Airdrieonians (loan)	2018–19	Scottish League One	4	0	0	0	0	0	–		0	0	4	0
Ayr United (loan)	2019–20	Scottish Championship	24	0	2	0	0	0	–		0	0	26	0
Ayr United	2020–21	Scottish Championship	19	0	1	0	3	0	–		0	0	23	0
Ayr United	2021–22	Scottish Championship	26	0	2	0	4	0	–		1	0	33	0
Ayr United	2022–23	Scottish Championship	17	1	4	0	3	0	–		0	0	24	1
Ayr United	Total		62	1	7	0	10	0	0	0	1	0	80	1
Queen of the South	2023–24	Scottish League One	10	1	1	0	4	0	–		2	0	17	1
Clyde	2024–25	Scottish League Two	16	0	1	0	3	0	–		1	0	21	0
Haka	2025	Veikkausliiga	19	2	4	0	4	0	–		–		27	2
Waterford	2026	LOI Premier Division	21	0	3	0	–		–		–		24	0
Career total			156	4	19	0	21	0	0	0	8	0	204	4
