= List of Scottish football transfers winter 2025–26 =

This is a list of Scottish football transfers featuring at least one 2025–26 Scottish Premiership club or one 2025–26 Scottish Championship club which were completed after the summer 2025 transfer window closed and before the end of the 2025–26 season.

== List ==
Date	Name	Moving from	Moving to	Fee
2 September 2025	Stuart Armstrong	Sheffield Wednesday	Aberdeen	Free
2 September 2025	Kelechi Iheanacho	Sevilla	Celtic	Free
3 September 2025	Ester Sokler	Aberdeen	Radnicki 1923	Loan
4 September 2025	Fletcher Boyd	Aberdeen	Aston Villa	£1,000,000
5 September 2025	Jacob MacIntyre	Hibernian	Arbroath	Loan
5 September 2025	Ben Vickery	Hibernian	Manchester City	£200,000
5 September 2025	Ricco Diack	Partick Thistle	Airdrieonians	Loan
7 September 2025	Leon King	Rangers	Ayr United	Loan
12 September 2025	Scott Fraser	Dundee	Ross County	Free
12 September 2025	Rhys Walker	Falkirk	Cowdenbeath	Loan
12 September 2025	Caelan McCrone	Falkirk	Berwick Rangers	Loan
13 September 2025	Cammy MacPherson	St Johnstone	Greenock Morton	Free
16 September 2025	Kieran O'Hara	Kilmarnock	Dundee	Free
25 September 2025	Trevor Carson	Dundee	Ross County	Loan
25 September 2025	Zander MacKenzie	Partick Thistle	Queen of the South	Loan
26 September 2025	Barney Stewart	Falkirk	Dunfermline Athletic	Loan
26 September 2025	Adam Emslie	Ross County	Cove Rangers	Loan
26 September 2025	Arron Lyall	Ross County	Greenock Morton	Loan
30 September 2025	Sean Mackie	Falkirk	Ross County	Loan
30 September 2025	Ryan Duncan	Aberdeen	Ross County	Loan
30 September 2025	Miller Thomson	Dundee United	Ross County	Loan
1 October 2025	Joshua Brenet	Al-Rayyan	Livingston	Free
1 October 2025	Brooklyn Kabongolo	Livingston	Arbroath	Loan
1 October 2025	Sean McArdle	Celtic	Partick Thistle	Loan
1 October 2025	Jake Hastie	Ayr United	Airdrieonians	Loan
1 October 2025	Calvin Beattie	Dundee United	Airdrieonians	Loan
1 October 2025	Sam Cleall-Harding	Dundee United	Airdrieonians	Loan
1 October 2025	Scott Constable	Dundee United	Airdrieonians	Loan
19 October 2025	Dapo Mebude	Dunfermline Athletic	Arbroath	Free
22 October 2025	Tobi Oluwayemi	Celtic	Kilmarnock	Loan
24 October 2025	Tyreece John-Jules	Crawley Town	Kilmarnock	Free
4 November 2025	Ryan Edwards	Chennaiyin	Falkirk	Free
18 December 2025	Jack Wells-Morrison	Crystal Palace	Ross County	Free
1 January 2026	Jake Hastie	Ayr United	Airdrieonians	Free
1 January 2026	Michael Schjønning-Larsen	FCI Levadia Tallinn	Kilmarnock	Free
1 January 2026	Jordi Altena	RKC Waalwijk	Heart of Midlothian	£500,000
1 January 2026	Islam Chesnokov	Tobol	Heart of Midlothian	Free
1 January 2026	Emmanuel Danso	Stabæk	Livingston	Free
1 January 2026	Joshua Zimmerman	TOP Oss	Livingston	Undisclosed
2 January 2026	Joe Bevan	Burnley	Dundee	Free
2 January 2026	Julian Araujo	Bournemouth	Celtic	Loan
2 January 2026	Shaun Donnellan	Livingston	Truro City	Free
2 January 2026	Andy Winter	Livingston	Raith Rovers	Loan
2 January 2026	George Robesten	Ross County	Weston-super-Mare	Undisclosed
3 January 2026	Callum Smith	Raith Rovers	Queen's Park	Free
4 January 2026	Hayato Inamura	Celtic	Tokyo	Loan
5 January 2026	Yevhen Kucherenko	Dundee United	Panetolikos	Undisclosed
5 January 2026	Harrison Sharp	Dundee	Montrose	Loan
6 January 2026	Craig Hepburn	St Johnstone	East Kilbride	Loan
6 January 2026	Ricki Lamie	Ross County	Queen's Park	Free
7 January 2026	Allan Campbell	Dundee United	St Mirren	Free
7 January 2026	Sam Fisher	Dunfermline Athletic	Kelty Hearts	Loan
7 January 2026	Olly Thomas	Bristol City	Dunfermline Athletic	Loan
8 January 2026	Alex Tamm	Olimpija Ljubljana	Livingston	Loan
9 January 2026	Scott Arfield	Falkirk	Livingston	Free
9 January 2026	Scott Robinson	Hamilton Academical	Arbroath	Free
10 January 2026	Ben Parkinson	Newcastle	Falkirk	Undisclosed
10 January 2026	Zander Clark	Heart of Midlothian	Doncaster Rovers	Loan
11 January 2026	Tochi Chukwuani	Sturm Graz	Rangers	£4,300,000
12 January 2026	Kofi Balmer	Motherwell	Bristol Rovers	Loan
12 January 2026	Louie Marsh	Sheffield United	Falkirk	Loan
12 January 2026	Levis Pitan	Piast Gliwice	Ross County	Loan
13 January 2026	Emile Acquah	Dundee	Harrogate Town	Loan
13 January 2026	Óscar Cortés	Rangers	Atlético Huracán	Loan
13 January 2026	Cale Loughrey	Hamilton Academical	Partick Thistle	Free
14 January 2026	Brad Halliday	Bradford City	Dundee	Undisclosed
14 January 2026	Joel Cotterill	Swansea City	Dundee	Loan
14 January 2026	Neil Farrugia	Barnsley	Dundee United	Undisclosed
14 January 2026	Tuur Rommens	Westerlo	Rangers	£3,000,000
15 January 2026	Kelle Roos	Notts County	Kilmarnock	Loan
15 January 2026	Vicente Besuijen	Aberdeen	Emmen	Loan
16 January 2026	Callumn Morrison	Linfield	Dunfermline Athletic	Undisclosed
16 January 2026	Sander Kartum	Heart of Midlothian	Wellington Phoenix	Loan
16 January 2026	Ester Sokler	Aberdeen	Radnički 1923	Undisclosed
16 January 2026	Lyall Cameron	Rangers	Aberdeen	Loan
16 January 2026	Andreas Skov Olsen	Wolfsburg	Rangers	Loan
16 January 2026	Jake Young	Stevenage	St Mirren	Undisclosed
16 January 2026	Ben Summers	Celtic	Ayr United	Loan
18 January 2026	Plamen Galabov	Dundee	Free agent	Loan
19 January 2026	Shane Blaney	Livingston	Sligo Rovers	Loan
19 January 2026	Babacar Fati	SJK Seinäjoki	Livingston	Undisclosed
19 January 2026	Eythor Bjørgolfsson	Umeå FC	Motherwell	Undisclosed
20 January 2026	Liam Morrison	Queens Park Rangers	Aberdeen	Loan
20 January 2026	Alfredo Agyeman	Falkirk	St Johnstone	Loan
20 January 2026	Jamie Smith	Hamilton Academical	Livingston	Free
20 January 2026	Taylor Sutherland	Dunfermline Athletic	Montrose	Free
21 January 2026	Mitchell Robertson	Celtic	Livingston	Undisclosed
21 January 2026	Oisin Smyth	St Mirren	Partick Thistle	Loan
21 January 2026	Kion Etete	Cardiff City	St Mirren	Loan
23 January 2026	Toyosi Olusanya	Houston Dynamo	Aberdeen	Loan
23 January 2026	Marc Leonard	Birmingham City	Heart of Midlothian	Loan
23 January 2026	Per Kristian Bråtveit	Strømsgodset	Aberdeen	Free
23 January 2026	Adam Devine	Rangers	Airdrieonians	Free
23 January 2026	Charlie McArthur	Newcastle United	Airdrieonians	Loan
23 January 2026	Kieran Dowell	Rangers	Hull City	Undisclosed
26 January 2026	Max Thompson	Newcastle United	Ayr United	Loan
27 January 2026	Adama Sidibeh	St Johnstone	Stockport County	Undisclosed
27 January 2026	Shin Yamada	Celtic	Preußen Münster	Loan
28 January 2026	Tete Yengi	Livingston	Machida Zelvia	Loan
28 January 2026	Ashley Maynard-Brewer	Charlton Athletic	Dundee United	Undisclosed
28 January 2026	Scott Fraser	Ross County	Brechin City	Free
28 January 2026	Jack Wells-Morrison	Ross County	Free agent	Free
29 January 2026	Kusini Yengi	Aberdeen	Cerezo Osaka	Loan
29 January 2026	Josh Fowler	Queen's Park	St Johnstone	Undisclosed
29 January 2026	Rogers Mato	FK Vardar	Heart of Midlothian	Loan
29 January 2026	Graham Carey	Livingston	Dunfermline Athletic	Loan
29 January 2026	Ronan Hale	Ross County	Gillingham	Undisclosed
29 January 2026	Owen Elding	Sligo Rovers	Hibernian	£350,000
29 January 2026	Kai Andrews	Coventry City	Hibernian	Loan
29 January 2026	Fraser Taylor	St Mirren	Partick Thistle	Loan
29 January 2026	Afeez Aremu	Kaiserslautern	Aberdeen	£150,000
30 January 2026	Kieron Bowie	Hibernian	Hellas Verona	£6,000,000
30 January 2026	Tom Lang	Falkirk	Arbroath	Loan
30 January 2026	Dane Scarlett	Tottenham Hotspur	Hibernian	Loan
30 January 2026	Findlay Curtis	Rangers	Kilmarnock	Loan
30 January 2026	Nicky Cleșcenco	Zimbru Chișinău	Kilmarnock	Free
30 January 2026	Joe Hugill	Manchester United	Kilmarnock	Undisclosed
1 February 2026	Freddie Turley	Derby County	Dunfermline Athletic	Loan
2 February 2026	Felix Passlack	Vfl Bochum	Hibernian	Undisclosed
2 February 2026	Joe Rothwell	Rangers	Sheffield United	Undisclosed
2 February 2026	Ante Šuto	Slaven Belupo	Hibernian	Undisclosed
2 February 2026	Ben Broggio	Aston Villa	Falkirk	Loan
2 February 2026	Dylan Levitt	Hibernian	Leyton Orient	Undisclosed
2 February 2026	Innes Cameron	Barrow	Raith Rovers	Loan
2 February 2026	Nikolay Todorov	Arbroath	Queen's Park	Free
2 February 2026	Junior Hoilett	Hibernian	Swindon Town	Undisclosed
2 February 2026	Kaedyn Kamara	Preston North End	Ross County	Loan
2 February 2026	Munashe Garananga	Copenhagen	Hibernian	Loan
2 February 2026	Clinton Nsiala	Rangers	K.V.C. Westerlo	Loan
2 February 2026	Ruari Paton	Port Vale	St Johnstone	Free
2 February 2026	Benjamin Arthur	Brentford	Celtic	Loan
2 February 2026	Curtis Main	Ayr United	Greenock Morton	Loan
2 February 2026	Jayden Carbon	Middlesbrough	Ross County	Loan
2 February 2026	Thibault Klidjé	Hibernian	Randers	Loan
2 February 2026	Danilo	Rangers	NEC Nijmegen	Loan
2 February 2026	Aaron Tshibola	Levadiakos	Kilmarnock	Free
2 February 2026	Lewis Montsma	Lincoln City	Dundee	Undisclosed
2 February 2026	Johnny Kenny	Celtic	Bolton Wanderers	Loan
2 February 2026	Uche Ikpeazu	St Johnstone	Ross County	Free
2 February 2026	Reuben Lopata-White	Leeds United	Greenock Morton	Loan
2 February 2026	Scott Wright	Birmingham City	Dundee	Loan
2 February 2026	Junior Adamu	SC Freiburg	Celtic	Loan
2 February 2026	Dylan Corr	Greenock Morton	Kelty Hearts	Free
2 February 2026	Jacob Devaney	Manchester United	St Mirren	Loan
2 February 2026	James Wilson	Heart of Midlothian	Tottenham Hotspur	Loan
2 February 2026	Aldahir Valenzuela	Monterrey	Dundee	Loan
2 February 2026	Stephen Welsh	Celtic	Motherwell	Loan
2 February 2026	Emmanuel Agyei	FC Ashdod	Dundee United	Undisclosed
2 February 2026	Evan Mooney	St Mirren	Arsenal	Undisclosed
2 February 2026	Gary Mackay-Steven	Ross County	Free agent	Free
2 February 2026	Joel Mvuka	Lorient	Celtic	Loan
2 February 2026	Peter Ambrose	Aberdeen	Diósgyőri VTK	Loan
2 February 2026	Tom McIntyre	Reading	Aberdeen	Free
4 February 2026	Steven Lawless	Partick Thistle	The Spartans	Free
6 February 2026	Joshua Brenet	Livingston	Kayserispor	Undisclosed
7 February 2026	Ben Brannan	Kilmarnock	Inverness CT	Loan
7 February 2026	Alex Oxlade-Chamberlain	Besiktas	Celtic	Free
9 February 2026	Nicky Clark	Ross County	Queen of the South	Free
10 February 2026	Kane Ritchie-Hosler	Dunfermline Athletic	Stenhousemuir	Loan
12 February 2026	Nikolaj Möller	Dundee United	Sandefjord	Undisclosed
13 February 2026	Barrie McKay	Heart of Midlothian	Livingston	Free
16 February 2026	Joel Nouble	Shenzhen Juniors	Livingston	Free
19 February 2026	Scott Martin	Partick Thistle	Queen's Park	Loan
19 February 2026	Eddie Beach	Kilmarnock	Derry City	Loan
20 February 2026	Josiah Sowa	Queen's Park	Annan Athletic	Loan
20 February 2026	Aidan Nesbitt	Falkirk	Arbroath	Loan
20 February 2026	Tunmise Sobowale	St Mirren	Shamrock Rovers	Loan
22 February 2026	James Brown	Kilmarnock	St Patrick's Athletic	Free
22 February 2026	Jefferson Cáceres	Dunfermline Athletic	FBC Melgar	Undiscloed
24 February 2026	Aston Oxborough	Motherwell	Dunfermline Athletic	Loan
27 February 2026	Ethan Ingram	Dundee	Partick Thistle	Loan
3 March 2026	Johnny Russell	Real Salt Lake	Dundee United	Free
11 March 2026	Marcus Dackers	Kilmarnock	Daegu FC	Undisclosed
27 March 2026	Elvis Bwomono	ÍBV	Aberdeen	Free

== See also ==
- List of Scottish football transfers summer 2025
