= 2025–26 Kilmarnock F.C. season =

Kilmarnock Football Club season

Kilmarnock
2025–26 season
- Chairman: Billy Bowie
- Manager: Stuart Kettlewell (until 15 December); Kris Doolan (interim); Neil McCann (from 6 January)
- Stadium: Rugby Park
- Premiership: 10th
- Scottish Cup: Fourth round
- League Cup: Quarter-finals
- Top goalscorer: League: Joe Hugill; Tyreece John-Jules (8); All: Joe Hugill; Tyreece John-Jules (8)
- Highest home attendance: 9,026 vs. Heart of Midlothian, 18 October 2025
- Lowest home attendance: 3,003 vs. East Fife, League Cup, 26 July 2025
- Average home league attendance: 6,192

The 2025–26 season was the 147th season of competitive association football and the 13th season in the Scottish Professional Football League played by Kilmarnock Football Club, a professional football club based in Kilmarnock, Ayrshire, Scotland. The club competed in the top tier of Scottish football for the fourth consecutive season.

== Results and fixtures ==
=== Pre-season friendlies ===
Kilmarnock's score is shown first in each case.

Kilmarnock pre-season results
Date	Venue	Opponents	Score	Kilmarnock scorers	Att.	Ref.
28 June 2025	Sportcomplex, Dirkshorn (N)	AZ Alkmaar	0–2			
1 July 2025	Rugby Park, Kilmarnock (H)	The New Saints	3–0	Kiltie, Watkins, Tiffoney	Nil	
4 July 2025	Rugby Park, Kilmarnock (H)	Ayr United	1–0	Kiltie 46’	5,416	
8 July 2025	Rugby Park, Kilmarnock (H)	Ballymena United	2–0	Anderson 19’, Watkins 35’	Nil	

=== Scottish Premiership ===
Kilmarnock's score is shown first in each case.

Kilmarnock in the 2025–26 Scottish Premiership
Date	Venue	Opponents	Score	Kilmarnock scorers	Att.	Ref.
2 August 2025	Rugby Park, Kilmarnock (H)	Livingston	2–2	Daniels 38', Watson 42'	5,291	
10 August 2025	Easter Road, Edinburgh (A)	Hibernian	2–2	Polworth 45', Brannan 48'	17,525	
23 August 2025	Rugby Park, Kilmarnock (H)	Dundee	0–0		5,670	
30 August 2025	Fir Park, Motherwell (A)	Motherwell	2–2	Daniels 19', Stanger 81'	6,230	
14 September 2025	Rugby Park, Kilmarnock (H)	Celtic	1–2	Watson 83'	8,499	
27 September 2025	Tannadice Park, Dundee (A)	Dundee United	2–0	Anderson 26', Deas 56'	8,800	
4 October 2025	Rugby Park, Kilmarnock (H)	St Mirren	2–0	Watson 28', Dackers 36'	5,399	
18 October 2025	Rugby Park, Kilmarnock (H)	Heart of Midlothian	0–3		9,026	
26 October 2025	Ibrox Stadium, Glasgow (A)	Rangers	1–3	Stanger 39'	49,681	
29 October 2025	Rugby Park, Kilmarnock (H)	Aberdeen	0–1		5,118	
1 November 2025	Falkirk Stadium, Falkirk (A)	Falkirk	1–3	John-Jules 69'	7,461	
9 November 2025	Celtic Park, Glasgow (A)	Celtic	0–4		58,088	
22 November 2025	Rugby Park, Kilmarnock (H)	Motherwell	1–3	Tiffoney 49'	5,100	
29 November 2025	Rugby Park, Kilmarnock (H)	Dundee United	1–1	Anderson 34' (pen.)	4,263	
3 December 2025	Tynecastle Park, Edinburgh (A)	Heart of Midlothian	1–1	Anderson 90'	18,508	
6 December 2025	Rugby Park, Kilmarnock (H)	Rangers	0–3		7,010	
14 December 2025	Pittodrie Stadium, Aberdeen (A)	Aberdeen	1–2	John-Jules 17'	15,472	
20 December 2025	Rugby Park, Kilmarnock (H)	Falkirk	0–1		5,708	
27 December 2025	St Mirren Park, Paisley (A)	St Mirren	0–0		7,531	
30 December 2025	Dens Park, Dundee (A)	Dundee	1–2	Kiltie 38'	5,039	
3 January 2026	Rugby Park, Kilmarnock (H)	Hibernian	1–3	John-Jules 57'	6,040	
10 January 2026	Almondvale Stadium, Livingston (A)	Livingston	1–1	Dackers 70'	2,281	
24 January 2026	Fir Park, Motherwell (A)	Motherwell	0–4		6,243	
31 January 2026	Rugby Park, Kilmarnock (H)	Aberdeen	3–0	Lyons 12', Anderson 14', John-Jules 59'	5,801	
4 February 2026	Ibrox Stadium, Glasgow (A)	Rangers	1–5	Kiltie 84'	49,056	
11 February 2026	Rugby Park, Kilmarnock (H)	St Mirren	4–3	Kiltie 43', John-Jules 45+1', 76, 82	4,892	
15 February 2026	Rugby Park, Kilmarnock (H)	Celtic	2–3	John-Jules 21', Hugill 28'	8,090	
21 February 2026	Tannadice Park, Dundee (A)	Dundee United	1–1	Watkins 90+1'	9,047	
28 February 2026	Falkirk Stadium, Falkirk (A)	Falkirk	1–5	Kiltie 40'	7,646	
14 March 2026	Rugby Park, Kilmarnock (H)	Heart of Midlothian	1–0	Schjønning-Larsen 17'	8,232	
21 March 2026	Rugby Park, Kilmarnock (H)	Livingston	2–0	Hugill 25', Curtis 77'	5,703	
4 April 2026	Easter Road, Edinburgh (A)	Hibernian	0–3		18,927	
11 April 2026	Rugby Park, Kilmarnock (H)	Dundee	2–2	Hugill 14', Schjønning-Larsen 33'	6,435	
25 April 2026	Pittodrie Stadium, Aberdeen (A)	Aberdeen	0–1		16,600	
2 May 2026	Rugby Park, Kilmarnock (H)	Dundee United	3–0	Deas 20', Curtis 51', Hugill 64'	5,524	
9 May 2026	St Mirren Park, Paisley (A)	St Mirren	3–0	Freckleton 9' (o.g.), Curtis 46', 68'	7,619	
12 May 2026	Rugby Park, Kilmarnock (H)	Dundee	3–1	Lowery 62', Hugill 85' (pen.), 90+4	5,839	
17 May 2026	Almondvale Stadium, Livingston (A)	Livingston	4–1	Hugill 24', 58', Cleșcenco 34', Curtis 53'	3,038	

=== Scottish Cup ===
Kilmarnock's score is shown first in each case.

Kilmarnock in the 2025–26 Scottish Cup
Date	Round	Venue	Opponents	Score	Kilmarnock scorers	Att.	Ref.
17 January 2026	Fourth round	Rugby Park, Kilmarnock (H)	Dundee	1–2	Thompson 11'	4,501	

=== Scottish League Cup ===
Kilmarnock's score is shown first in each case.

Kilmarnock in the 2025–26 League Cup
Date	Round	Venue	Opponents	Score	Kilmarnock scorers	Att.	Ref.
12 July 2025	Group stage	Dudgeon Park, Brora (A)	Brora Rangers	2–0	Brannan 39', Daniels 80'	263	
16 July 2025	Group stage	Rugby Park, Kilmarnock (H)	Livingston	1–0	Sylla 31' (o.g.)	3,430	
22 July 2025	Group stage	New Central Park, Kelty (A)	Kelty Hearts	0–0 (3–4 p)		1,106	
26 July 2025	Group stage	Rugby Park, Kilmarnock (H)	East Fife	4–0	Dackers 12', Daniels 15', Brannan 26', 47'	3,003	
17 August 2025	Second round	Rugby Park, Kilmarnock (H)	Dundee United	2–1	Dackers 6', Lyons 69'	4,853	
19 September 2025	Quarter-final	Rugby Park, Kilmarnock (H)	St Mirren	2–2 (3–5 p)	Deas 44', Anderson 86' (pen.)	7,192	

== Squad statistics ==
No.	Pos.	Name	Premiership		Scottish Cup		League Cup		Total		Discipline	
No.	Pos.	Name	Apps	Goals	Apps	Goals	Apps	Goals	Apps	Goals	Yellow card	Red card
1	GK	(Poland) Max Stryjek	12	0	0	0	4	0	16	0	0	0
2	DF	(Scotland) Jamie Brandon	12	0	0	0	5	0	17	0	3	0
3	DF	(Republic of Ireland) Corrie Ndaba	0	0	0	0	1	0	1	0	0	0
3	DF	(England) Dominic Thompson	37	0	1	1	2	0	40	1	6	1
4	DF	(Wales) Zac Williams	7	0	0	0	1	0	8	0	0	0
5	DF	(Scotland) Lewis Mayo	23	0	1	0	6	0	30	0	3	1
6	DF	(Scotland) Robbie Deas	36	2	1	0	5	1	42	3	11	0
7	MF	(Scotland) Rory McKenzie	18	0	1	0	4	0	23	0	0	0
8	MF	(Northern Ireland) Brad Lyons	31	1	1	0	4	1	36	2	8	0
9	FW	(Wales) Marcus Dackers	24	2	1	0	5	2	30	4	3	0
10	MF	(Northern Ireland) Matty Kennedy	0	0	0	0	0	0	0	0	0	0
11	MF	(Scotland) Greg Kiltie	34	4	0	0	6	0	40	4	3	0
12	MF	(Scotland) David Watson	33	3	1	0	6	0	40	3	10	1
13	GK	(Netherlands) Kelle Roos	11	0	1	0	0	0	12	0	0	0
14	DF	(New Zealand) George Stanger	20	2	0	0	5	0	25	2	6	1
15	DF	(Republic of Ireland) James Brown	15	0	0	0	1	0	16	0	2	0
16	MF	(Scotland) Kyle Magennis	5	0	0	0	6	0	11	0	1	0
17	FW	(Scotland) Scott Tiffoney	12	1	1	0	3	0	16	1	0	0
18	MF	(Wales) Tom Lowery	21	1	0	0	3	0	24	1	4	1
19	FW	(Scotland) Bruce Anderson	34	4	1	0	6	1	41	5	2	0
20	GK	(Scotland) Robby McCrorie	0	0	0	0	0	0	0	0	0	0
20	GK	(England) Tobi Oluwayemi	12	0	0	0	0	0	12	0	0	0
20	MF	(Moldova) Nicky Cleșcenco	5	1	0	0	0	0	5	1	0	0
21	DF	(Estonia) Michael Schjønning-Larsen	18	2	1	0	0	0	19	2	1	0
22	MF	(Scotland) Jack Thomson	16	0	1	0	0	0	17	0	2	2
23	FW	(Wales) Marley Watkins	14	1	0	0	4	0	18	1	0	0
24	FW	(England) Tyreece John-Jules	18	8	1	0	0	0	19	8	2	0
25	DF	(Canada) Ethan Brown	18	0	1	0	1	0	20	0	2	0
26	MF	(Scotland) Ben Brannan	17	1	0	0	5	3	22	4	1	0
27	FW	(Scotland) Kian Leslie	0	0	0	0	0	0	0	0	0	0
28	FW	(Scotland) Zander Craik	0	0	0	0	0	0	0	0	0	0
29	FW	(Suriname) Djenairo Daniels	7	2	0	0	6	2	13	4	0	0
30	GK	(Wales) Eddie Beach	3	0	0	0	2	0	5	0	0	0
31	MF	(Scotland) Liam Polworth	28	1	0	0	5	0	33	1	3	0
32	DF	(Scotland) Ruari Ellis	0	0	0	0	0	0	0	0	0	0
33	DF	(Scotland) Duncan Barlow	0	0	0	0	0	0	0	0	0	0
34	DF	(Scotland) Ethan Mersey	0	0	0	0	0	0	0	0	0	0
36	MF	(Democratic Republic of the Congo) Aaron Tshibola	14	0	0	0	0	0	14	0	3	0
37	MF	(Scotland) Cole Burke	0	0	0	0	0	0	0	0	0	0
39	DF	(Scotland) Euan Bowie	1	0	0	0	0	0	1	0	0	0
44	FW	(England) Joe Hugill	15	8	0	0	0	0	15	8	3	0
52	MF	(Scotland) Findlay Curtis	14	5	0	0	0	0	14	5	1	0

== Club statistics ==
=== Competition overview ===
Competition	First match	Last match	Record							
Competition	First match	Last match	Pld	W	D	L	GF	GA	GD	Win %
Premiership	2 August 2025	17 May 2026	38	10	10	18	50	68	−18	26.32
Scottish Cup	17 January 2026	17 January 2026	1	0	0	1	1	2	−1	0.00
League Cup	12 July 2025	19 September 2025	6	4	2	0	11	3	+8	66.67
Total			45	14	12	19	62	73	−11	31.11

Source: Competitions

=== League table ===
Pos	Team	Pld	W	D	L	GF	GA	GD	Pts	Qualification or relegation (Note: Teams played each other three times (33 matches), before the league was split into two groups (the top six and the bottom six).)
8	Dundee	38	11	9	18	42	61	−19	42	
9	Aberdeen	38	11	7	20	40	55	−15	40	
10	Kilmarnock	38	10	10	18	50	68	−18	40	
11	St Mirren (O)	38	8	10	20	30	55	−25	34	Qualification for the Premiership play-off final
12	Livingston (R)	38	2	15	21	40	75	−35	21	Relegation to Championship

Rules for classification: 1) Points; 2) Goal difference; 3) Goals scored; 4) Head-to-head points; 5) Head-to-head goal difference; 6) Play-off (only if deciding champion, UEFA competition qualification, second stage group allocation, or relegation).
(O) Play-off winners; (R) Relegated

=== League cup table ===
Pos	Team	Pld	W	PW	PL	L	GF	GA	GD	Pts	Qualification	KIL	LIV	EFI	KEL	BRO
1	Kilmarnock	4	3	0	1	0	7	0	+7	10	Qualification for the second round	—	1–0	4–0	—	—
2	Livingston	4	3	0	0	1	10	2	+8	9	Qualification for the second round	—	—	—	6–0	2–0
3	East Fife	4	2	0	0	2	5	6	−1	6		—	1–2	—	—	3–0
4	Kelty Hearts	4	1	1	0	2	4	7	−3	5		p0–0	—	0–1	—	—
5	Brora Rangers	4	0	0	0	4	0	11	−11	0		0–2	—	—	0–4	—

Rules for classification: 1) goal difference, 2) goals scored, 3) away goals scored, 4) matches won, 5) away matches won, 6) drawing of lots.

== Transfers ==
=== Transfers in ===
Date	Pos	Player	Previous Club	Fee	Ref
10 June 2025	DF	Jamie Brandon	Livingston	Free	
17 June 2025	MF	Greg Kiltie	St Mirren	Undisclosed	
17 June 2025	MF	Jack Thomson	Queen's Park	Free	
18 June 2025	FW	Scott Tiffoney	Dundee	Free	
19 June 2025	DF	(New Zealand) George Stanger	Ayr United	Free	
20 June 2025	FW	(Wales) Marcus Dackers	(England) Salford City	Free	
4 July 2025	GK	(Poland) Max Stryjek	(Poland) Jagiellonia Białystok	Undisclosed	
7 July 2025	FW	(Suriname) Djenairo Daniels	(Republic of Ireland) Cork City	Undisclosed	
7 July 2025	MF	(Wales) Tom Lowery	(England) Portsmouth	Free	
11 July 2025	GK	(Wales) Eddie Beach	(England) Chelsea	Free	
2 August 2025	DF	(England) Dominic Thompson	Motherwell	Free	
30 August 2025	DF	(Republic of Ireland) James Brown	Ross County	Free	
24 October 2025	FW	(England) Tyreece John-Jules	(England) Crawley Town	Free	
1 January 2026	DF	(Estonia) Michael Schjønning-Larsen	(Estonia) Levadia Tallinn	Free	
30 January 2026	MF	(Moldova) Nicky Cleșcenco	(Moldova) Zimbru Chișinău	Free	
30 January 2026	FW	(England) Joe Hugill	(England) Manchester United	Undisclosed	
2 February 2026	MF	(Democratic Republic of the Congo) Aaron Tshibola	(Greece) Levadiakos	Free	

=== Transfers out ===
Date	Pos	Player	Subsequent Club	Fee	Ref
1 June 2025	FW	Bobby Wales	(Wales) Swansea City	Compensation	
3 June 2025	FW	Innes Cameron	(England) Barrow	Free	
3 June 2025	MF	Daniel Armstrong	(Romania) Dinamo București	Free	
3 June 2025	FW	Aaron Brown	Ayr United	Free	
3 June 2025	MF	(Northern Ireland) Liam Donnelly	St Mirren	Free	
3 June 2025	GK	Aidan Glavin	Raith Rovers	Free	
3 June 2025	MF	Gary Mackay-Steven	Ross County	Free	
3 June 2025	MF	Fraser Murray	(England) Wigan Athletic	Free	
3 June 2025	GK	(Republic of Ireland) Kieran O'Hara	Dundee	Free	
3 June 2025	FW	(Northern Ireland) Kyle Vassell	(United States) Colorado Springs Switchbacks	Free	
3 June 2025	DF	(Wales) Joe Wright	(England) Bradford City	Free	
28 July 2025	DF	(Republic of Ireland) Corrie Ndaba	(Italy) Lecce	Undisclosed	
22 February 2026	DF	(Republic of Ireland) James Brown	(Republic of Ireland) St Patrick's Athletic	Free	
11 March 2026	FW	(Wales) Marcus Dackers	(South Korea) Daegu FC	Undisclosed	

=== Loans in ===
Date	Pos	Player	From	End Date	Ref
12 August 2025	DF	(Wales) Zac Williams	(England) Crewe Alexandra	31 May 2026	
22 October 2025	GK	(England) Tobi Oluwayemi	Celtic	15 January 2026	
16 January 2026	GK	(Netherlands) Kelle Roos	(England) Notts County	31 May 2026	
30 January 2026	MF	Findlay Curtis	Rangers	31 May 2026	

=== Loans out ===
Date	Pos	Player	To	End Date	Ref
25 June 2025	GK	Dylan Brown	Auchinleck Talbot	31 May 2026	
15 July 2025	GK	Corey Armour	Kelty Hearts	31 May 2026	
15 July 2025	DF	Duncan Barlow	Annan Athletic	Co-operation loan	
15 July 2025	FW	Zander Craik	Annan Athletic	Co-operation loan	
15 July 2025	MF	Josh Gilmour	Annan Athletic	Co-operation loan	
22 July 2025	MF	Cole Burke	Queen of the South	Co-operation loan	
28 July 2025	MF	Grant Marchant	Albion Rovers	Co-operation loan	
28 July 2025	FW	(Nigeria) Samuel Duruh	Albion Rovers	31 May 2026	
8 August 2025	DF	Euan Bowie	Albion Rovers	Co-operation loan	
29 August 2025	GK	Robby McCrorie	(Denmark) Esbjerg fB	31 May 2026	
29 September 2025	FW	Kian Leslie	Queen of the South	Co-operation loan	
30 January 2026	FW	Zander Craik	Albion Rovers	Co-operation loan	
7 February 2026	DF	Ben Brannan	Inverness CT	31 May 2026	
19 February 2026	GK	(Wales) Eddie Beach	(Republic of Ireland) Derry City	31 May 2026	
