= 2026–27 Kilmarnock F.C. season =

Kilmarnock Football Club season

Kilmarnock
2026–27 season
- Chairman: Billy Bowie
- Manager: Neil McCann
- Stadium: Rugby Park
- League Cup: Quarter-finals
Home colours	Away colours

The 2026–27 season is the 148th season of competitive association football and the 14th season in the Scottish Professional Football League played by Kilmarnock Football Club, a professional football club based in Kilmarnock, Ayrshire, Scotland. The club will compete in the top tier of Scottish football for the fifth consecutive season.

== Results and fixtures ==
=== Pre-season friendlies ===
Kilmarnock's score is shown first in each case.

Kilmarnock pre-season results
Date	Venue	Opponents	Score	Kilmarnock scorers	Att.	Ref.
1 July 2026	The Oval, Belfast (A)	Glentoran	4–0	Hugill 10', Coughlin 14', John-Jules 65', Owen 83'		
4 July 2026	Windsor Park, Belfast (A)	Linfield	3–2	Coughlin 11', Mathurin 14', Kiltie 77'		

=== Scottish Premiership ===
Kilmarnock's score is shown first in each case.

Kilmarnock in the 2026–27 Scottish Premiership
Date	Venue	Opponents	Score	Kilmarnock scorers	Att.	Ref.
2 August 2026	McDiarmid Park, Perth (A)	St Johnstone	3–4	Kiltie 37', Hugill 49', Holt 53' (o.g.)	5,733	
9 August 2026	Rugby Park, Kilmarnock (H)	Celtic	1–5	Schjønning-Larsen 56'	8,353	
29 August 2026	Rugby Park, Kilmarnock (H)	Dundee United	0–4		5,389	
2 September 2026	Rugby Park, Kilmarnock (H)	St Mirren	0–1		5,024	
5 September 2026	Pittodrie Stadium, Aberdeen (A)	Aberdeen	0–0		14,824	
15 September 2026	Easter Road, Edinburgh (A)	Hibernian	1–0	Stanger 40'	15,493	
19 September 2026	Rugby Park, Kilmarnock (H)	Heart of Midlothian	1–1	McCart 16' (o.g.)	7,452	
10 October 2026	Ibrox Stadium, Glasgow (A)	Rangers	1–3	Cleșcenco 90'	50,501	
17 October 2026	Rugby Park, Kilmarnock (H)	Motherwell	3–2	Kiltie 2', 69', John-Jules 58'	5,137	
24 October 2026	Falkirk Stadium, Falkirk (A)	Falkirk	0–3		6,897	
28 October 2026	Dens Park, Dundee (A)	Dundee	1–3	Hugill 75' (pen.)	4,866	
31 October 2026	Rugby Park, Kilmarnock (H)	St Johnstone	2–2	McCarthy 15', Daniels 41'	4,615	
8 November 2026	Celtic Park, Glasgow (A)	Celtic	0–1		58,269	
21 November 2026	Rugby Park, Kilmarnock (H)	Aberdeen	2–4	Kiltie 19', John–Jules 57'	5,470	
28 November 2026	St Mirren Park, Paisley (A)	St Mirren				

=== Scottish League Cup ===
Kilmarnock's score is shown first in each case.

Kilmarnock in the 2026–27 League Cup
Date	Round	Venue	Opponents	Score	Kilmarnock scorers	Att.	Ref.
14 July 2026	Group stage	Beechwood Park, Auchinleck (H)	Raith Rovers	0–0 (4–2 p)		1,441	
18 July 2026	Group stage	Borough Briggs, Elgin (A)	Elgin City	1–0	Hugill 90+3'	909	
21 July 2026	Group stage	Beechwood Park, Auchinleck (H)	Hamilton Academical	1–0	Kiltie 60'	1,343	
25 July 2026	Group stage	Balmoor Stadium, Peterhead (A)	Peterhead	0–0 (4–5 p)		953	
14 August 2026	Second round	Rugby Park, Kilmarnock (H)	Ayr United	3–2	Hugill 42', Schjønning-Larsen 79', Cleșcenco 89'	11,365	
12 September 2026	Quarter-final	Rugby Park, Kilmarnock (H)	Aberdeen	1–1 (1–3 p)	John-Jules	6,401	

== Squad statistics ==
No.	Pos.	Name	Premiership		Scottish Cup		League Cup		Total		Discipline	
No.	Pos.	Name	Apps	Goals	Apps	Goals	Apps	Goals	Apps	Goals	Yellow card	Red card
1	GK	(Poland) Max Stryjek	6	0	0	0	5	0	11	0	0	0
2	DF	(Scotland) Jamie Brandon	14	0	0	0	4	0	18	0	5	1
3	DF	(Sierra Leone) MJ Kamson-Kamara	7	0	0	0	0	0	7	0	1	0
4	DF	(Republic of Ireland) Cathal McCarthy	12	1	0	0	1	0	13	1	5	0
5	MF	(Scotland) Mark O'Hara	9	0	0	0	6	0	15	0	0	0
6	DF	(Scotland) Robbie Deas	3	0	0	0	5	0	8	0	1	0
7	MF	(Scotland) Rory McKenzie	5	0	0	0	2	0	7	0	1	0
8	MF	(Sweden) Erik Ring	12	0	0	0	6	0	18	0	0	0
9	FW	(England) Joe Hugill	13	1	0	0	6	2	19	3	4	0
10	FW	(England) Tyreece John-Jules	14	2	0	0	6	0	20	2	3	0
11	MF	(Scotland) Greg Kiltie	13	4	0	0	6	1	19	5	1	0
12	GK	(England) Calum Ferrie	4	0	0	0	1	0	5	0	0	0
14	DF	(New Zealand) George Stanger	13	1	0	0	5	0	18	1	4	0
15	DF	(England) Johnly Yfeko	2	0	0	0	0	0	2	0	0	0
17	FW	(Scotland) Scott Tiffoney	0	0	0	0	0	0	0	0	0	0
18	MF	(Wales) Tom Lowery	14	0	0	0	6	0	20	0	3	0
19	DF	(Germany) Jonathan Meier	2	0	0	0	1	0	3	0	0	0
20	MF	(Moldova) Nicky Cleșcenco	6	1	0	0	3	1	9	2	2	0
21	DF	(Estonia) Michael Schjønning-Larsen	14	1	0	0	6	1	20	2	3	0
22	MF	(Scotland) Jack Thomson	0	0	0	0	2	0	2	0	0	0
23	MF	(England) Roshaun Mathurin	1	0	0	0	4	0	5	0	0	0
25	DF	(Canada) Ethan Schilte-Brown	1	0	0	0	2	0	3	0	1	0
26	MF	(Scotland) Ben Brannan	0	0	0	0	0	0	0	0	0	0
27	FW	(Wales) Ieuan Owen	6	0	0	0	4	0	10	0	1	0
29	FW	(Suriname) Djenairo Daniels	10	1	0	0	1	0	11	1	2	1
32	DF	(Scotland) Ruari Ellis	0	0	0	0	1	0	1	0	0	0
36	MF	(Democratic Republic of the Congo) Aaron Tshibola	12	0	0	0	3	0	15	0	5	1
37	MF	(Scotland) Cole Burke	1	0	0	0	0	0	1	0	0	0
38	DF	(Scotland) Archie Traynor	0	0	0	0	0	0	0	0	0	0
39	DF	(Scotland) Euan Bowie	0	0	0	0	3	0	3	0	0	0
40	GK	(Scotland) Corey Armour	0	0	0	0	0	0	0	0	0	0
49	MF	(Scotland) Bailey Rice	7	0	0	0	3	0	9	0	1	0
58	MF	(Germany) Nico Mantl	4	0	0	0	0	0	4	0	0	0

== Club statistics ==
=== Competition overview ===
Competition	First match	Last match	Record							
Competition	First match	Last match	Pld	W	D	L	GF	GA	GD	Win %
Premiership	2 August 2026	May 2027	14	2	3	9	15	33	−18	14.29
Scottish Cup	January 2027	2027	0	0	0	0	0	0	+0	—
League Cup	14 July 2026	12 September 2026	6	3	3	0	6	3	+3	50.00
Total			20	5	6	9	21	36	−15	25.00

Source: Competitions

=== League table ===
Pos	Team	Pld	W	D	L	GF	GA	GD	Pts	Qualification or relegation (Note: Teams play each other three times (33 matches), before the league is split into two groups (the top six and the bottom six).)
8	Aberdeen	13	4	2	7	16	20	−4	14	
9	St Mirren	14	4	2	8	13	26	−13	14	
10	Motherwell	14	3	4	7	16	23	−7	13	
11	Hibernian	13	3	2	8	15	21	−6	11	Qualification for the Premiership play-off final
12	Kilmarnock	14	2	3	9	15	33	−18	9	Relegation to the Championship

Updated to match(es) played on 21 November 2026. Source:
Rules for classification: 1) Points; 2) Goal difference; 3) Goals scored; 4) Head-to-head points; 5) Head-to-head goal difference; 6) Play-off (only if deciding champion, UEFA competition qualification, second stage group allocation, or relegation).

=== League cup table ===
Pos	Team	Pld	W	PW	PL	L	GF	GA	GD	Pts	Qualification	KIL	HAM	RAI	PET	ELG
1	Kilmarnock	4	2	1	1	0	2	0	+2	9	Qualification for the second round	—	1–0	p0–0	—	—
2	Hamilton Academical	4	2	1	0	1	7	2	+5	8		—	—	p1–1	—	5–0
3	Raith Rovers	4	2	0	2	0	5	2	+3	8		—	—	—	1–0	3–1
4	Peterhead	4	1	1	0	2	3	3	0	5		p0–0	0–1	—	—	—
5	Elgin City	4	0	0	0	4	2	12	−10	0		0–1	—	—	1–3	—

Rules for classification: 1) goal difference, 2) goals scored, 3) away goals scored, 4) matches won, 5) away matches won, 6) drawing of lots.

== Transfers ==
=== Transfers in ===
Date	Pos	Player	Previous Club	Fee	Ref
2 June 2026	FW	(Wales) Ieuan Owen	(Wales) Barry Town United	Undisclosed	
19 June 2026	GK	(England) Calum Ferrie	Queen's Park	Undisclosed	
23 June 2026	MF	(England) Roshaun Mathurin	(Slovakia) AS Trenčín	Free	
28 June 2026	MF	Mark O'Hara	St Mirren	Free	
4 July 2026	MF	(Sweden) Erik Ring	(England) Lincoln City	Undisclosed	
31 July 2026	DF	(Germany) Jonathan Meier	(Germany) SSV Ulm	Free	
31 July 2026	DF	(England) Johnly Yfeko	(England) Exeter City	Undisclosed	
16 October 2026	GK	(Germany) Nico Mantl	(Portugal) Arouca	Free	

=== Transfers out ===
Date	Pos	Player	Subsequent Club	Fee	Ref
1 June 2026	GK	Robby McCrorie		Free	
1 June 2026	DF	Lewis Mayo	Aberdeen	Free	
1 June 2026	DF	Duncan Barlow	Cumnock Juniors	Free	
1 June 2026	DF	Ethan Mersey		Free	
1 June 2026	MF	(Northern Ireland) Matty Kennedy		Free	
1 June 2026	MF	(Northern Ireland) Brad Lyons	Aberdeen	Free	
1 June 2026	MF	Kyle Magennis		Free	
1 June 2026	MF	Liam Polworth	Livingston	Free	
1 June 2026	FW	Bruce Anderson	Livingston	Free	
1 June 2026	FW	Zander Craik	Cumnock Juniors	Free	
1 June 2026	FW	Kian Leslie	Clydebank	Free	
1 June 2026	FW	(Wales) Marley Watkins		Free	
15 June 2026	MF	David Watson	(England) Bolton Wanderers	Compensation	
20 July 2026	GK	(Wales) Eddie Beach	(Republic of Ireland) Shelbourne	Undisclosed	
26 July 2026	DF	(England) Dominic Thompson	(Belgium) SK Beveren	Undisclosed	
28 August 2026	MF	(Scotland) Jack Thomson	(England) Swindon Town	Undisclosed	

=== Loans in ===
Date	Pos	Player	From	End Date	Ref
28 June 2026	MF	Bailey Rice	Rangers	31 May 2027	
18 August 2026	DF	(Republic of Ireland) Cathal McCarthy	(England) Hull City	31 May 2027	
3 September 2026	DF	(Sierra Leone) MJ Kamson-Kamara	Heart of Midlothian	1 January 2027	

=== Loans out ===
Date	Pos	Player	To	End Date	Ref
9 July 2026	DF	Archie Traynor	Stranraer	31 May 2027	
10 July 2026	DF	Ben Brannan	Queen's Park	31 May 2027	
29 July 2026	DF	Ruari Ellis	Queen of the South	Co-operation loan	
29 July 2026	DF	Mitchell Spence	Queen of the South	Co-operation loan	
29 July 2026	MF	Aaron Davis	Queen of the South	Co-operation loan	
29 July 2026	MF	(United States) Cole Coughlin	Queen of the South	Co-operation loan	
19 August 2026	FW	Scott Tiffoney	Raith Rovers	31 May 2027	
25 August 2026	DF	(Canada) Ethan Schilte-Brown	(Northern Ireland) Glentoran	31 May 2027	
4 September 2026	GK	Corey Armour	Auchinleck Talbot	31 May 2027	
