= 2025–26 Scottish League Cup group stage =

2025–26 Scottish League Cup (group stage)
Tournament details
- Country: Scotland
- Dates: 11 July 2025 – 27 July 2025
- Teams: 40

Tournament statistics
- Matches played: 80
- Goals scored: 268 (3.35 per match)
- Top goal scorer: John Robertson (6 goals)
- All statistics correct as of 27 July 2025.

The 2025–26 Scottish League Cup group stage was played from 11 July to 27 July 2025.

== Format ==
The competition began with eight groups of five teams; each team played one match against each other team in their group, either home or away, for a total of two home and two away matches. The five clubs initially competing in the UEFA Champions League (Celtic and Rangers), Europa League (Aberdeen and Hibernian) and Conference League (Dundee United) received a bye to the second round. The group stage consisted of 40 teams: all remaining teams that competed across the SPFL in 2024–25, the 2024–25 Highland Football League champions (Brora Rangers) and runners-up (Brechin City), and the 2024–25 Lowland Football League champions (East Kilbride).

The winners of each of the eight groups, as well as the three best runners-up, progressed to the second round (last 16). At this stage, the competition reverts to the traditional knock-out format. The three group winners with the highest points total and the European entrants were seeded.

The traditional point system of awarding three points for a win and one point for a draw was used. In addition, for each group stage match that finished in a draw, a penalty shoot-out took place, with the winner being awarded a bonus point.

The draw for the group stage took place on 28 May 2025 and was broadcast live on the Premier Sports and SPFL YouTube channels.

== Teams ==
The teams were seeded according to their final league positions in 2024–25 and drawn into eight groups, with each group comprising one team from each pot.

=== Seeding ===
Teams in Bold qualified for the second round.

Pot 1	Pot 2	Pot 3	Pot 4	Pot 5
01. **St Mirren**; 02. **Heart of Midlothian**; 03. **Motherwell**; 04. **Kilmarnock**; 05. Dundee; 06. Ross County; 07. **St Johnstone**; 08. **Falkirk**	09. **Livingston**; 10. **Ayr United**; 11. **Partick Thistle**; 12. Raith Rovers; 13. **Greenock Morton**; 14. Dunfermline Athletic; 15. Queen's Park; 16. Airdrieonians	17. Hamilton Academical; 18. Arbroath; 19. Cove Rangers; 20. Queen of the South; 21. Stenhousemuir; 22. **Alloa Athletic**; 23. Kelty Hearts; 24. Inverness Caledonian Thistle	25. Montrose; 26. Annan Athletic; 27. Dumbarton; 28. Peterhead; 29. East Fife; 30. Edinburgh City; 31. Elgin City; 32. The Spartans	33. Stirling Albion; 34. Clyde; 35. Stranraer; 36. Forfar Athletic; 37. Bonnyrigg Rose; 38. East Kilbride; 39. Brora Rangers; 40. Brechin City

== Group stage ==
All times are BST (UTC +1).

=== Group A ===
Pos	Team	Pld	W	PW	PL	L	GF	GA	GD	Pts	Qualification	FAL	COV	QPA	SPA	BRE
1	Falkirk	4	3	1	0	0	14	1	+13	11	Qualification for the second round	—	—	3–1	4–0	—
2	Cove Rangers	4	2	0	1	1	5	2	+3	7		0–0p	—	—	1–0	—
3	Queen's Park	4	2	0	0	2	9	6	+3	6		—	2–1	—	—	5–0
4	The Spartans	4	2	0	0	2	4	6	−2	6		—	—	2–1	—	2–0
5	Brechin City	4	0	0	0	4	0	17	−17	0		0–7	0–3	—	—	—

Rules for classification: 1) goal difference, 2) goals scored, 3) away goals scored, 4) matches won, 5) away matches won, 6) drawing of lots.

==== Matches ====
12 July 2025
15:00

Brechin City	0–7	Falkirk
		Arfield 18', 34' (pen.); Tait 27', 77', 83'; Agyeman 30'; MacIver 90'

Glebe Park, Brechin
Attendance: 1,003
Referee: Dan McFarlane
12 July 2025
15:00

The Spartans	2–1	Queen's Park
Dall 83'; Russell 89' (pen.)		Fowler 35'

Ainslie Park, Edinburgh
Attendance: 395
Referee: Chris Graham
15 July 2025
19:45

Cove Rangers	1–0	The Spartans
Glass 4'

Balmoral Stadium, Aberdeen
Attendance: 321
Referee: Jordan Curran
15 July 2025
19:45

Queen's Park	5–0	Brechin City
McDonnell 13', 60'; Fowler 46', 55'; Ruth 70'

Lesser Hampden, Glasgow
Attendance: 432
Referee: Alastair Grieve
19 July 2025
15:00

Cove Rangers	0–0	Falkirk
Penalties
Glass (penalty missed); Donaldson (penalty scored); Parker (penalty missed); Harrington (penalty scored)	2–4	(penalty scored) Henderson; (penalty scored) MacIver; (penalty scored) Spencer; (penalty scored) Oliver

Balmoral Stadium, Aberdeen
Attendance: 811
Referee: Grant Irvine
19 July 2025
15:00

The Spartans	2–0	Brechin City
Stowe 37'; Sheridan 65' (o.g.)

Ainslie Park, Edinburgh
Attendance: 369
Referee: Connor Ashwood
22 July 2025
19:45

Brechin City	0–3	Cove Rangers
		Eguaibor 9', 37'; Megginson 44'

Glebe Park, Brechin
Attendance: 323
Referee: Cameron Stirling
22 July 2025
19:45

Falkirk	3–1	Queen's Park
Ross 42', 51'; Graham 86'		Fowler 14'

Falkirk Stadium, Falkirk
Attendance: 2,387
Referee: Nick Walsh
26 July 2025
15:00

Falkirk	4–0	The Spartans
Tait 23'; Arfield 52'; Miller 55', 76'

Falkirk Stadium, Falkirk
Attendance: 2,312
Referee: David Dickinson
26 July 2025
15:00

Queen's Park	2–1	Cove Rangers
Ruth 20' (pen.); Fowler 90'		Megginson 15'

Lesser Hampden, Glasgow
Attendance: 453
Referee: Daniel Graves

=== Group B ===
Pos	Team	Pld	W	PW	PL	L	GF	GA	GD	Pts	Qualification	PAR	ROS	STR	QOS	EDI
1	Partick Thistle	4	4	0	0	0	11	2	+9	12	Qualification for the second round	—	—	2–0	2–0	—
2	Ross County	4	2	0	1	1	11	4	+7	7		1–3	—	—	—	8–0
3	Stranraer	4	1	1	1	1	2	3	−1	6		—	p1–1	—	1–0	—
4	Queen of the South	4	1	0	0	3	4	4	0	3		—	0–1	—	—	4–0
5	Edinburgh City	4	0	1	0	3	1	16	−15	2		1–4	—	p0–0	—	—

Rules for classification: 1) goal difference, 2) goals scored, 3) away goals scored, 4) matches won, 5) away matches won, 6) drawing of lots.

==== Matches ====
11 July 2025
19:45

Edinburgh City	1–4	Partick Thistle
Daramola 45'		Logan 6'; Crawford 9'; Mahon 23' (o.g.); Chalmers 40'

Meadowbank Stadium, Edinburgh
Attendance: 564
Referee: Iain Snedden
12 July 2025
15:00

Stranraer	1–1	Ross County
Sharp 76'		Hale 43'
Penalties
Russell (penalty missed); Sharp (penalty scored); Reid (penalty missed); Dolan (penalty scored); Quigg (penalty scored); Ecrepont (penalty scored); Dunne (penalty scored); Edgar (penalty missed); Hunter (penalty scored)	6–5	Hale (penalty missed); White (penalty missed); O'Sullivan (penalty scored); Cornelius (penalty scored); Docherty (penalty scored); Emslie (penalty scored); Robesten (penalty scored); Crompton (penalty missed); Wright (penalty missed)

Stair Park, Stranraer
Attendance: 469
Referee: Graham Grainger
15 July 2025
19:45

Partick Thistle	2–0	Stranraer
Ashcroft 45'; Watt 88'

Firhill Stadium, Glasgow
Attendance: 1,952
Referee: Duncan Nicolson
15 July 2025
19:45

Queen of the South	4–0	Edinburgh City
Guthrie 16'; Lyon 46', 51'; Hewitt 78'

Palmerston Park, Dumfries
Attendance: 781
Referee: Connor Ashwood
19 July 2025
15:00

Edinburgh City	0–0	Stranraer
Penalties
Mahon (penalty scored); Lawson (penalty scored); McArthur (penalty scored); Mitchell (penalty scored); Burgess (penalty scored)	5–3	(penalty scored) Russell; (penalty missed) Stuart; (penalty scored) Sharp; (penalty scored) Hughes

Meadowbank Stadium, Edinburgh
Attendance: 126
Referee: Joel Kennedy
19 July 2025
15:00

Queen of the South	0–1	Ross County
		Henderson 74'

Palmerston Park, Dumfries
Attendance: 1,012
Referee: Peter Stuart
22 July 2025
19:45

Partick Thistle	2–0	Queen of the South
Fitzpatrick 32'; Let'sosa 34'

Firhill Stadium, Glasgow
Attendance: 2,235
Referee: George Calder
22 July 2025
19:45

Ross County	8–0	Edinburgh City
Hale 22', 39', 47' (pen.); Henderson 37', 57'; Coyle 76', 89'; Phillips 82'

Victoria Park, Dingwall
Attendance: 1,265
Referee: Sean Murdoch
26 July 2025
15:00

Ross County	1–3	Partick Thistle
White 88'		Crawford 44'; Chalmers 64'; Stanway 84'

Victoria Park, Dingwall
Attendance: 1,740
Referee: Ryan Lee
26 July 2025
15:00

Stranraer	1–0	Queen of the South
Quigg 59'

Stair Park, Stranraer
Attendance: 815
Referee: Duncan Williams

=== Group C ===
Pos	Team	Pld	W	PW	PL	L	GF	GA	GD	Pts	Qualification	ALL	AIR	DND	MON	BON
1	Alloa Athletic	4	4	0	0	0	7	3	+4	12	Qualification for the second round	—	—	1–0	2–1	—
2	Airdrieonians	4	3	0	0	1	8	4	+4	9		2–3	—	—	—	3–0
3	Dundee	4	2	0	0	2	8	3	+5	6		—	0–1	—	5–0	—
4	Montrose	4	1	0	0	3	6	10	−4	3		—	1–2	—	—	4–1
5	Bonnyrigg Rose	4	0	0	0	4	2	11	−9	0		0–1	—	1–3	—	—

Rules for classification: 1) goal difference, 2) goals scored, 3) away goals scored, 4) matches won, 5) away matches won, 6) drawing of lots.

==== Matches ====
12 July 2025
15:00

Bonnyrigg Rose	0–1	Alloa Athletic
		Rankin 2'

Ferguson Park, Rosewell
Attendance: 348
Referee: Ross Clark
12 July 2025
15:00

Dundee	0–1	Airdrieonians
		Mochrie 22'

Dens Park, Dundee
Attendance: 2,306
Referee: David Dickinson
15 July 2025
19:45

Airdrieonians	3–0	Bonnyrigg Rose
Armstrong 11'; Henderson 38' (pen.); McGrattan 40'

Excelsior Stadium, Airdrie
Attendance: 735
Referee: Greg Soutar
15 July 2025
19:45

Alloa Athletic	2–1	Montrose
O'Donnell 21'; Roberts 61'		Waddell 57'

Recreation Park, Alloa
Attendance: 258
Referee: George Calder
19 July 2025
15:00

Alloa Athletic	1–0	Dundee
Graham 69' (o.g.)

Recreation Park, Alloa
Attendance: 786
Referee: Don Robertson
19 July 2025
15:00

Montrose	4–1	Bonnyrigg Rose
Fellows 48' (o.g.); Loudon 50'; Masson 80'; Wighton 83'		Higginbotham 45'

Gayfield Park, Arbroath
Attendance: 252
Referee: Stewart Luke
22 July 2025
19:45

Bonnyrigg Rose	1–3	Dundee
Ross 36'		Robertson 20'; Acquah 86'; Koumetio 89'

Ferguson Park, Rosewell
Attendance: 853
Referee: Peter Stuart
23 July 2025
19:15

Montrose	1–2	Airdrieonians
Loudon 81'		Henderson 56'; McGrattan 62'

Gayfield Park, Arbroath
Attendance: 513
Referee: Duncan Nicolson
26 July 2025
15:00

Airdrieonians	2–3	Alloa Athletic
Wilson 51'; Henderson 62' (pen.)		Foster 29'; Taggart 64' (pen.); Buchanan 89'

Excelsior Stadium, Airdrie
Attendance: 860
Referee: Sean Murdoch
26 July 2025
15:00

Dundee	5–0	Montrose
Murray 3' (pen.), 47'; C.Robertson 81'; Astley 85'; Graham 88'

Dens Park, Dundee
Attendance: 1,808
Referee: Duncan Nicolson

=== Group D ===
Pos	Team	Pld	W	PW	PL	L	GF	GA	GD	Pts	Qualification	STM	AYR	ARB	FOR	ANN
1	St Mirren	4	3	0	1	0	12	4	+8	10	Qualification for the second round	—	2–1	—	—	8–2
2	Ayr United	4	3	0	0	1	14	3	+11	9	Qualification for the second round	—	—	4–0	3–0	—
3	Arbroath	4	1	1	0	2	6	5	+1	5		p0–0	—	—	—	6–0
4	Forfar Athletic	4	1	1	0	2	3	6	−3	5		1–2	—	1–0	—	—
5	Annan Athletic	4	0	0	1	3	4	21	−17	1		—	1–6	—	1–1p	—

Rules for classification: 1) goal difference, 2) goals scored, 3) away goals scored, 4) matches won, 5) away matches won, 6) drawing of lots.

==== Matches ====
12 July 2025
15:00

Annan Athletic	1–1	Forfar Athletic
Smith 65' (pen.)		Rennie 17'
Penalties
Muir (penalty missed); Smith (penalty scored); Todd (penalty scored); McGowan (penalty missed)	2–4	Rodden (penalty scored); Slater (penalty scored); Cannon (penalty scored); Lorimer (penalty scored)

Galabank, Annan
Attendance: 245
Referee: Jamie Wilkie
12 July 2025
15:00

Arbroath	0–0	St Mirren
Penalties
Reilly (penalty scored); O'Brien (penalty scored); Watson (penalty scored); Muirhead (penalty scored); Gallagher (penalty scored)	5–3	Fraser (penalty scored); Smyth (penalty scored); Mooney (penalty scored); Taylor (penalty missed)

Gayfield Park, Arbroath
Attendance: 1,636
Referee: Steven McLean
15 July 2025
19:45

Annan Athletic	1–6	Ayr United
A.Smith 70'		Walker 16'; Oakley 41', 46', 47'; Thomas 60'; McRoberts 75'

Galabank, Annan
Attendance: 527
Referee: Daniel Graves
15 July 2025
19:45

Forfar Athletic	1–2	St Mirren
Inglis 80'		Richardson 9'; Mandron 75'

Station Park, Forfar
Attendance: 966
Referee: Dan McFarlane
19 July 2025
15:00

Ayr United	4–0	Arbroath
Main 19', 49'; Bonnar 74'; Oakley 82'

Somerset Park, Ayr
Attendance: 1,534
Referee: Greg Soutar
19 July 2025
15:00

St Mirren	8–2	Annan Athletic
Phillips 4', 7'; Mandron 9', 82', 87'; King 61' (pen.); Richardson 84'; Idowu 90'		Trialist 38', 57'

St Mirren Park, Paisley
Attendance: 2,164
Referee: Ross Hardie
22 July 2025
19:45

Arbroath	6–0	Annan Athletic
Pettifer 29', 32', 45'; Reilly 51'; Hickey-Fugaccia 64'; Todorov 81'

Gayfield Park, Arbroath
Attendance: 622
Referee: Alastair Grieve
22 July 2025
19:45

Ayr United	3–0	Forfar Athletic
Thomas 3'; Oakley 32'; Main 34'

Somerset Park, Ayr
Attendance: 1,721
Referee: Lloyd Wilson
26 July 2025
15:00

Forfar Athletic	1–0	Arbroath
Shepherd 12'

Station Park, Forfar
Attendance: 1,015
Referee: Iain Snedden
27 July 2025
15:00

St Mirren	2–1	Ayr United
Phillips 16', 38'		Holt 65'

St Mirren Park, Paisley
Attendance: 4,174
Referee: Euan Anderson

=== Group E ===
Pos	Team	Pld	W	PW	PL	L	GF	GA	GD	Pts	Qualification	HOM	DNF	DUM	HAM	STI
1	Heart of Midlothian	4	4	0	0	0	16	1	+15	12	Qualification for the second round	—	4–1	4–0	—	—
2	Dunfermline Athletic	4	3	0	0	1	9	5	+4	9		—	—	—	2–1	2–0
3	Dumbarton	4	2	0	0	2	2	8	−6	6		—	0–4	—	—	1–0
4	Hamilton Academical	4	1	0	0	3	3	7	−4	3		0–4	—	0–1	—	—
5	Stirling Albion	4	0	0	0	4	0	9	−9	0		0–4	—	—	0–2	—

Rules for classification: 1) goal difference, 2) goals scored, 3) away goals scored, 4) matches won, 5) away matches won, 6) drawing of lots.

==== Matches ====
12 July 2025
15:00

Stirling Albion	0–2	Hamilton Academical
		Smith 52'; MacDonald 59'

Forthbank Stadium, Stirling
Attendance: 648
Referee: Peter Stuart
12 July 2025
17:15

Heart of Midlothian	4–1	Dunfermline Athletic
Wilson 3'; Shankland 76' (pen.), 79' (pen.); Kingsley 90'		Cooper 38'

Tynecastle Park, Edinburgh
Attendance: 12,940
Referee: Lloyd Wilson
15 July 2025
19:45

Dumbarton	1–0	Stirling Albion
Banner 53' (o.g.)

Dumbarton Football Stadium, Dumbarton
Attendance: 455
Referee: Jamie Wilkie
15 July 2025
19:45

Hamilton Academical	0–4	Heart of Midlothian
		Findlay 6'; Kabangu 45'; Wilson 69'; Braga 83'

Broadwood Stadium, Cumbernauld
Attendance: 1,827
Referee: Ross Hardie
19 July 2025
15:00

Dumbarton	0–4	Dunfermline Athletic
		Cooper 14', 59'; Kane 45'; Tod 55'

Dumbarton Football Stadium, Dumbarton
Attendance: 1,026
Referee: George Calder
19 July 2025
17:15

Stirling Albion	0–4	Heart of Midlothian
		Halkett 13', 80'; Braga 23'; Kyziridis 38'

Forthbank Stadium, Stirling
Attendance: 3,309
Referee: Dan McFarlane
22 July 2025
19:45

Dunfermline Athletic	2–1	Hamilton Academical
Tod 39'; Kilday 70' (o.g.)		Shaw 69'

East End Park, Dunfermline
Attendance: 2,582
Referee: Daniel Graves
23 July 2025
19:45

Heart of Midlothian	4–0	Dumbarton
Shankland 17'; Steinwender 45'; Kyziridis 52'; Braga 72'

Tynecastle Park, Edinburgh
Attendance: 8,722
Referee: Iain Snedden
26 July 2025
15:00

Dunfermline Athletic	2–0	Stirling Albion
Tod 75'; MacLeod 90' (pen.)

East End Park, Dunfermline
Attendance: 2,389
Referee: Graham Grainger
26 July 2025
15:00

Hamilton Academical	0–1	Dumbarton
		Roy 45'

Broadwood Stadium, Cumbernauld
Attendance: 290
Referee: Joel Kennedy

=== Group F ===
Pos	Team	Pld	W	PW	PL	L	GF	GA	GD	Pts	Qualification	STJ	RAI	ICT	EKB	ELG
1	St Johnstone	4	4	0	0	0	15	2	+13	12	Qualification for the second round	—	3–1	—	—	8–0
2	Raith Rovers	4	2	0	0	2	13	9	+4	6		—	—	5–1	2–4	—
3	Inverness Caledonian Thistle	4	2	0	0	2	9	8	+1	6		0–1	—	—	—	2–0
4	East Kilbride	4	2	0	0	2	11	12	−1	6		1–3	—	2–6	—	—
5	Elgin City	4	0	0	0	4	2	19	−17	0		—	1–5	—	1–4	—

Rules for classification: 1) goal difference, 2) goals scored, 3) away goals scored, 4) matches won, 5) away matches won, 6) drawing of lots.

==== Matches ====
12 July 2025
15:00

East Kilbride	1–3	St Johnstone
Robertson 7'		Gullan 52'; Sidibeh 60'; Kirk 81'

K-Park Training Academy, East Kilbride
Attendance: 620
Referee: Daniel Graves
12 July 2025
15:00

Elgin City	1–5	Raith Rovers
Murray 54'		Easton 10' (pen.), 60' (pen.); Rowe 37'; Vaughan 38'; Mullin 72'

Borough Briggs, Elgin
Attendance: 1,025
Referee: Sean Murdoch
15 July 2025
19:45

Inverness Caledonian Thistle	2–0	Elgin City
McKay 36'; Longstaff 39'

Caledonian Stadium, Inverness
Attendance: 1,296
Referee: Stewart Luke
15 July 2025
19:45

Raith Rovers	2–4	East Kilbride
Rowe 69'; Vaughan 87'		Healy 48'; Robertson 89', 90' (pen.), 90'

Stark's Park, Kirkcaldy
Attendance: 1,728
Referee: Iain Snedden
19 July 2025
15:00

Elgin City	1–4	East Kilbride
MacIver 42' (pen.)		Leitch 2', 21'; Flanagan 53'; Robertson 65'

Borough Briggs, Elgin
Attendance: 569
Referee: Josh Hay
19 July 2025
15:00

Inverness Caledonian Thistle	0–1	St Johnstone
		Ikpeazu 90'

Caledonian Stadium, Inverness
Attendance: 1,585
Referee: Graham Grainger
22 July 2025
19:45

East Kilbride	2–6	Inverness Caledonian Thistle
Devine 17' (o.g.); Robertson 87'		McKay 25'; Allan 48'; Longstaff 51', 57'; MacLeod 54'; Stewart 62'

K-Park Training Academy, East Kilbride
Attendance: 568
Referee: Jamie McCunnie
22 July 2025
19:45

St Johnstone	3–1	Raith Rovers
Gullan 27'; McPake 51'; Kirk 80'		Hamilton 57'

McDiarmid Park, Perth
Attendance: 3,358
Referee: Greg Soutar
26 July 2025
15:00

Raith Rovers	5–1	Inverness Caledonian Thistle
Easton 5', 7' (pen.), 64' (pen.); Hamilton 36'; Savage 90' (o.g.)		Wotherspoon 58'

Stark's Park, Kirkcaldy
Attendance: 1,032
Referee: Ross Hardie
26 July 2025
15:00

St Johnstone	8–0	Elgin City
Tumilty 3'; Kirk 20', 79'; Gullan 42', 45'; Stanton 65'; Ikpeazu 78'; Sprangler 84'

McDiarmid Park, Perth
Attendance: 2,398
Referee: Peter Stuart

=== Group G ===
Pos	Team	Pld	W	PW	PL	L	GF	GA	GD	Pts	Qualification	MOT	GMO	CLY	STE	PET
1	Motherwell	4	3	1	0	0	8	3	+5	11	Qualification for the second round	—	3–0	—	—	2–1
2	Greenock Morton	4	3	0	0	1	10	5	+5	9	Qualification for the second round	—	—	3–0	3–0	—
3	Clyde	4	1	1	1	1	6	8	−2	6		2–2p	—	—	p2–2	—
4	Stenhousemuir	4	1	0	1	2	3	6	−3	4		0–1	—	—	—	1–0
5	Peterhead	4	0	0	0	4	4	9	−5	0		—	2–4	1–2	—	—

Rules for classification: 1) goal difference, 2) goals scored, 3) away goals scored, 4) matches won, 5) away matches won, 6) drawing of lots.

==== Matches ====
12 July 2025
15:00

Clyde	2–2	Motherwell
Hilton 16'; Scullion 53'		Maswanhise 21', 48'
Penalties
Robson (penalty scored); Leitch (penalty scored); Nevans (penalty scored); Fleming (penalty scored); Dunachie (penalty missed)	4–5	Halliday (penalty scored); Slattery (penalty scored); Just (penalty scored); Sule (penalty scored); Sparrow (penalty scored)

New Douglas Park, Hamilton
Attendance: 1,931
Referee: Matthew MacDermid
12 July 2025
15:00

Peterhead	2–4	Greenock Morton
Colloty 37' (pen.); Ross 85'		Blues 21'; Moore 43'; Crawford 58'; Delaney 77'

Balmoor Stadium, Peterhead
Attendance: 660
Referee: Stewart Luke
15 July 2025
19:45

Greenock Morton	3–0	Stenhousemuir
Adeloye 7', 45'; Moffat 43'

Cappielow, Greenock
Attendance: 1,080
Referee: Peter Stuart
15 July 2025
19:45

Motherwell	2–1	Peterhead
Longelo 28'; Fadinger 90'		Jack Brown 9'

Fir Park, Motherwell
Attendance: 2,657
Referee: Don Robertson
19 July 2025
15:00

Peterhead	1–2	Clyde
Shanks 82' (pen.)		Howie 90'; Goldie 90' (o.g.)

Balmoor Stadium, Peterhead
Attendance: 550
Referee: Gary Hanvidge
19 July 2025
15:00

Stenhousemuir	0–1	Motherwell
		O'Donnell 41'

Ochilview Park, Stenhousemuir
Attendance: 1,394
Referee: Lloyd Wilson
22 July 2025
19:45

Clyde	2–2	Stenhousemuir
Scullion 79'; Dunachie 88'		Anderson 23'; Mendy 86'
Penalties
Robson (penalty scored); Redfern (penalty missed); Hilton (penalty scored); Cuddihy (penalty scored); Williamson (penalty scored)	4–3	Meechan (penalty missed); Anderson (penalty scored); Bilham (penalty missed); Taylor (penalty scored); Mendy (penalty scored)

New Douglas Park, Hamilton
Attendance: 423
Referee: Jordan Curran
22 July 2025
19:45

Motherwell	3–0	Greenock Morton
Stamatelopoulos 52'; Maswanhise 83', 90'

Fir Park, Motherwell
Attendance: 3,255
Referee: Ryan Lee
26 July 2025
15:00

Greenock Morton	3–0	Clyde
Robertson 12'; Adeloye 45' (pen.); Longridge 84'

Cappielow, Greenock
Attendance: 1,293
Referee: Steven McLean
26 July 2025
15:00

Stenhousemuir	1–0	Peterhead
Taylor 43'

Ochilview Park, Stenhousemuir
Attendance: 211
Referee: Stewart Luke

=== Group H ===
Pos	Team	Pld	W	PW	PL	L	GF	GA	GD	Pts	Qualification	KIL	LIV	EFI	KEL	BRO
1	Kilmarnock	4	3	0	1	0	7	0	+7	10	Qualification for the second round	—	1–0	4–0	—	—
2	Livingston	4	3	0	0	1	10	2	+8	9	Qualification for the second round	—	—	—	6–0	2–0
3	East Fife	4	2	0	0	2	5	6	−1	6		—	1–2	—	—	3–0
4	Kelty Hearts	4	1	1	0	2	4	7	−3	5		p0–0	—	0–1	—	—
5	Brora Rangers	4	0	0	0	4	0	11	−11	0		0–2	—	—	0–4	—

Rules for classification: 1) goal difference, 2) goals scored, 3) away goals scored, 4) matches won, 5) away matches won, 6) drawing of lots.

==== Matches ====
12 July 2025
15:00

Brora Rangers	0–2	Kilmarnock
		Brannan 39'; Daniels 80'

Dudgeon Park, Brora
Attendance: 263
Referee: Duncan Nicolson
12 July 2025
15:00

East Fife	1–2	Livingston
Slattery 55'		Muirhead 45'; Tait 47'

Bayview Stadium, Methil
Attendance: 743
Referee: Ross Hardie
15 July 2025
19:45

Brora Rangers	0–4	Kelty Hearts
		Johnston 3'; Cole 14', 45'; Ferguson 64'

Dudgeon Park, Brora
Attendance: 263
Referee: Joel Kennedy
16 July 2025
19:45

Kilmarnock	1–0	Livingston
Sylla 31' (o.g.)

Rugby Park, Kilmarnock
Attendance: 3,430
Referee: Sean Murdoch
19 July 2025
15:00

Kelty Hearts	0–1	East Fife
		Trouten 77'

New Central Park, Kelty
Attendance: 619
Referee: Euan Henderson
19 July 2025
15:00

Livingston	2–0	Brora Rangers
Wilson 31'; Rudden 84'

Almondvale Stadium, Livingston
Attendance: 756
Referee: Daniel Graves
22 July 2025
19:45

East Fife	3–0	Brora Rangers
Austin 14'; Trouten 28', 69'

Bayview Stadium, Methil
Attendance: 448
Referee: Lewis Hogarth
22 July 2025
19:45

Kelty Hearts	0–0	Kilmarnock
Penalties
Murray (penalty scored); Arnott (penalty scored); Masson (penalty missed); McCarvel (penalty scored); Teasdale (penalty scored)	4–3	Magennis (penalty scored); Daniels (penalty scored); Watson (penalty scored); Brandon (penalty missed); Dackers (penalty missed)

New Central Park, Kelty
Attendance: 1,106
Referee: David Dickinson
26 July 2025
15:00

Kilmarnock	4–0	East Fife
Dackers 12'; Daniels 15'; Brannan 26', 47'

Rugby Park, Kilmarnock
Attendance: 3,003
Referee: Lloyd Wilson
26 July 2025
15:00

Livingston	6–0	Kelty Hearts
Winter 1'; Montgomery 27'; Muirhead 29', 38'; Blaney 85'; May 86'

Almondvale Stadium, Livingston
Attendance: 843
Referee: Grant Irvine

== Best runners-up ==
Pos	Grp	Team	Pld	W	PW	PL	L	GF	GA	GD	Pts	Qualification
1	D	Ayr United	4	3	0	0	1	14	3	+11	9	Qualification for the second round
2	H	Livingston	4	3	0	0	1	10	2	+8	9	Qualification for the second round
3	G	Greenock Morton	4	3	0	0	1	10	5	+5	9	Qualification for the second round
4	E	Dunfermline Athletic	4	3	0	0	1	9	5	+4	9	
5	C	Airdrieonians	4	3	0	0	1	8	4	+4	9	
6	B	Ross County	4	2	0	1	1	11	4	+7	7	
7	A	Cove Rangers	4	2	0	1	1	5	2	+3	7	
8	F	Raith Rovers	4	2	0	0	2	13	9	+4	6	

Rules for classification: 1) goal difference, 2) goals scored, 3) away goals scored, 4) matches won, 5) away matches won, 6) drawing of lots.
