= John-Jules =

John-Jules is a surname. Notable people with the surname include:

- Danny John-Jules (born 1960), British actor, singer, and dancer
- Tyreece John-Jules (born 2001), English footballer
