= 2025–26 Scottish League Cup =

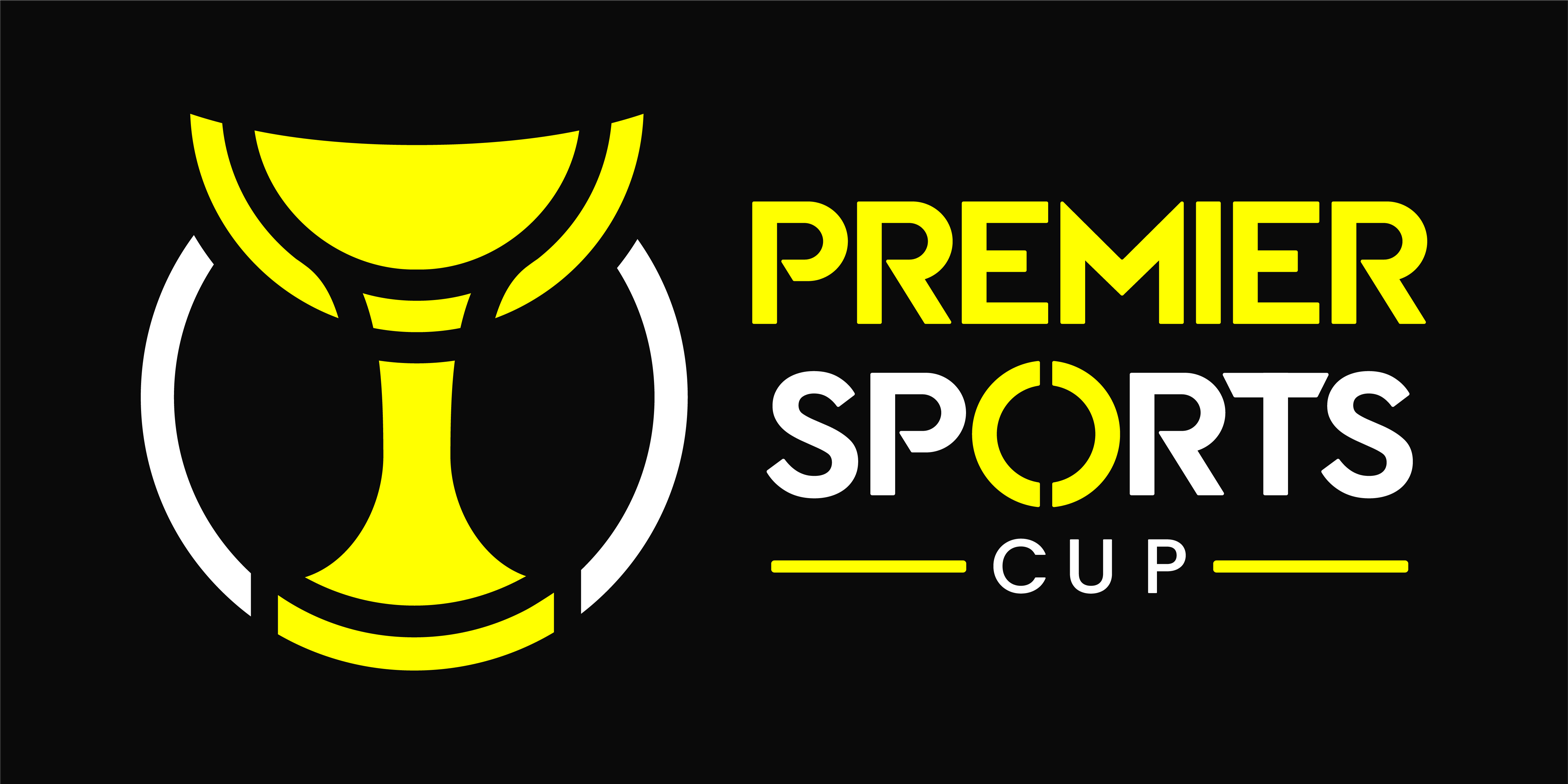
- Premier Sports Cup logo

Tournament details
- Country: Scotland
- Dates: 11 July – 14 December 2025
- Teams: 45

Final positions
- Champions: St Mirren (2nd title)
- Runners-up: Celtic

Tournament statistics
- Matches played: 95
- Goals scored: 316 (3.33 per match)
- Attendance: 399,483 (4,205 per match)
- Top goal scorer: Mikael Mandron (7 goals)

The 2025–26 Scottish League Cup, also known as the Premier Sports Cup for sponsorship reasons, was the 80th season of Scotland's second-most prestigious football knockout competition. Celtic were the defending champions, but lost 3–1 to St Mirren in the final.

== Schedule ==
Round	First match date	Fixtures	Clubs
Group stage	12 July 2025	80	45 → 16
Second round	15 August 2025	8	16 → 8
Quarter-finals	19 September 2025	4	8 → 4
Semi-finals	1 November 2025	2	4 → 2
Final	14 December 2025	1	2 → 1

== Format ==
The competition began with eight groups of five teams. In addition, the five clubs initially competing in the UEFA Champions League (Celtic and Rangers), Europa League (Aberdeen and Hibernian) and Conference League (Dundee United) received a bye to the second round. The group stage consisted of 40 teams:

- all remaining teams that competed across the SPFL in 2024–25,
- the 2024–25 Highland Football League champions (Brora Rangers) and runners-up (Brechin City), and
- the 2024–25 Lowland Football League champions (East Kilbride).

The winners of each of the eight groups, as well as the three best runners-up, progressed to the second round, where they were joined by the five teams given byes (last 16; 8 + 3 + 5). At this stage, the competition reverted to the traditional knock-out format. The three group winners with the highest points total and the European entrants were seeded.

=== Bonus point system ===
Three points are awarded for a win and one point for a draw. In addition, in each group stage match that finishes in a draw, there is a penalty shoot-out, with the winner being awarded a bonus point.

== Group stage ==
The teams were seeded according to their final league positions in 2024–25 and drawn into eight groups, with each group comprising one team from each pot. The draw for the group stage took place on 28 May 2025 and was broadcast live on the Premier Sports and SPFL YouTube channels.

=== Group A ===
Pos	Team	Pld	W	PW	PL	L	GF	GA	GD	Pts	Qualification	FAL	COV	QPA	SPA	BRE
1	Falkirk	4	3	1	0	0	14	1	+13	11	Qualification for the second round	—	—	3–1	4–0	—
2	Cove Rangers	4	2	0	1	1	5	2	+3	7		0–0p	—	—	1–0	—
3	Queen's Park	4	2	0	0	2	9	6	+3	6		—	2–1	—	—	5–0
4	The Spartans	4	2	0	0	2	4	6	−2	6		—	—	2–1	—	2–0
5	Brechin City	4	0	0	0	4	0	17	−17	0		0–7	0–3	—	—	—

Rules for classification: 1) goal difference, 2) goals scored, 3) away goals scored, 4) matches won, 5) away matches won, 6) drawing of lots.

=== Group B ===
Pos	Team	Pld	W	PW	PL	L	GF	GA	GD	Pts	Qualification	PAR	ROS	STR	QOS	EDI
1	Partick Thistle	4	4	0	0	0	11	2	+9	12	Qualification for the second round	—	—	2–0	2–0	—
2	Ross County	4	2	0	1	1	11	4	+7	7		1–3	—	—	—	8–0
3	Stranraer	4	1	1	1	1	2	3	−1	6		—	p1–1	—	1–0	—
4	Queen of the South	4	1	0	0	3	4	4	0	3		—	0–1	—	—	4–0
5	Edinburgh City	4	0	1	0	3	1	16	−15	2		1–4	—	p0–0	—	—

Rules for classification: 1) goal difference, 2) goals scored, 3) away goals scored, 4) matches won, 5) away matches won, 6) drawing of lots.

=== Group C ===
Pos	Team	Pld	W	PW	PL	L	GF	GA	GD	Pts	Qualification	ALL	AIR	DND	MON	BON
1	Alloa Athletic	4	4	0	0	0	7	3	+4	12	Qualification for the second round	—	—	1–0	2–1	—
2	Airdrieonians	4	3	0	0	1	8	4	+4	9		2–3	—	—	—	3–0
3	Dundee	4	2	0	0	2	8	3	+5	6		—	0–1	—	5–0	—
4	Montrose	4	1	0	0	3	6	10	−4	3		—	1–2	—	—	4–1
5	Bonnyrigg Rose	4	0	0	0	4	2	11	−9	0		0–1	—	1–3	—	—

Rules for classification: 1) goal difference, 2) goals scored, 3) away goals scored, 4) matches won, 5) away matches won, 6) drawing of lots.

=== Group D ===
Pos	Team	Pld	W	PW	PL	L	GF	GA	GD	Pts	Qualification	STM	AYR	ARB	FOR	ANN
1	St Mirren	4	3	0	1	0	12	4	+8	10	Qualification for the second round	—	2–1	—	—	8–2
2	Ayr United	4	3	0	0	1	14	3	+11	9	Qualification for the second round	—	—	4–0	3–0	—
3	Arbroath	4	1	1	0	2	6	5	+1	5		p0–0	—	—	—	6–0
4	Forfar Athletic	4	1	1	0	2	3	6	−3	5		1–2	—	1–0	—	—
5	Annan Athletic	4	0	0	1	3	4	21	−17	1		—	1–6	—	1–1p	—

Rules for classification: 1) goal difference, 2) goals scored, 3) away goals scored, 4) matches won, 5) away matches won, 6) drawing of lots.

=== Group E ===
Pos	Team	Pld	W	PW	PL	L	GF	GA	GD	Pts	Qualification	HOM	DNF	DUM	HAM	STI
1	Heart of Midlothian	4	4	0	0	0	16	1	+15	12	Qualification for the second round	—	4–1	4–0	—	—
2	Dunfermline Athletic	4	3	0	0	1	9	5	+4	9		—	—	—	2–1	2–0
3	Dumbarton	4	2	0	0	2	2	8	−6	6		—	0–4	—	—	1–0
4	Hamilton Academical	4	1	0	0	3	3	7	−4	3		0–4	—	0–1	—	—
5	Stirling Albion	4	0	0	0	4	0	9	−9	0		0–4	—	—	0–2	—

Rules for classification: 1) goal difference, 2) goals scored, 3) away goals scored, 4) matches won, 5) away matches won, 6) drawing of lots.

=== Group F ===
Pos	Team	Pld	W	PW	PL	L	GF	GA	GD	Pts	Qualification	STJ	RAI	ICT	EKB	ELG
1	St Johnstone	4	4	0	0	0	15	2	+13	12	Qualification for the second round	—	3–1	—	—	8–0
2	Raith Rovers	4	2	0	0	2	13	9	+4	6		—	—	5–1	2–4	—
3	Inverness Caledonian Thistle	4	2	0	0	2	9	8	+1	6		0–1	—	—	—	2–0
4	East Kilbride	4	2	0	0	2	11	12	−1	6		1–3	—	2–6	—	—
5	Elgin City	4	0	0	0	4	2	19	−17	0		—	1–5	—	1–4	—

Rules for classification: 1) goal difference, 2) goals scored, 3) away goals scored, 4) matches won, 5) away matches won, 6) drawing of lots.

=== Group G ===
Pos	Team	Pld	W	PW	PL	L	GF	GA	GD	Pts	Qualification	MOT	GMO	CLY	STE	PET
1	Motherwell	4	3	1	0	0	8	3	+5	11	Qualification for the second round	—	3–0	—	—	2–1
2	Greenock Morton	4	3	0	0	1	10	5	+5	9	Qualification for the second round	—	—	3–0	3–0	—
3	Clyde	4	1	1	1	1	6	8	−2	6		2–2p	—	—	p2–2	—
4	Stenhousemuir	4	1	0	1	2	3	6	−3	4		0–1	—	—	—	1–0
5	Peterhead	4	0	0	0	4	4	9	−5	0		—	2–4	1–2	—	—

Rules for classification: 1) goal difference, 2) goals scored, 3) away goals scored, 4) matches won, 5) away matches won, 6) drawing of lots.

=== Group H ===
Pos	Team	Pld	W	PW	PL	L	GF	GA	GD	Pts	Qualification	KIL	LIV	EFI	KEL	BRO
1	Kilmarnock	4	3	0	1	0	7	0	+7	10	Qualification for the second round	—	1–0	4–0	—	—
2	Livingston	4	3	0	0	1	10	2	+8	9	Qualification for the second round	—	—	—	6–0	2–0
3	East Fife	4	2	0	0	2	5	6	−1	6		—	1–2	—	—	3–0
4	Kelty Hearts	4	1	1	0	2	4	7	−3	5		p0–0	—	0–1	—	—
5	Brora Rangers	4	0	0	0	4	0	11	−11	0		0–2	—	—	0–4	—

Rules for classification: 1) goal difference, 2) goals scored, 3) away goals scored, 4) matches won, 5) away matches won, 6) drawing of lots.

=== Best runners-up ===
Pos	Grp	Team	Pld	W	PW	PL	L	GF	GA	GD	Pts	Qualification
1	D	Ayr United	4	3	0	0	1	14	3	+11	9	Qualification for the second round
2	H	Livingston	4	3	0	0	1	10	2	+8	9	Qualification for the second round
3	G	Greenock Morton	4	3	0	0	1	10	5	+5	9	Qualification for the second round
4	E	Dunfermline Athletic	4	3	0	0	1	9	5	+4	9	
5	C	Airdrieonians	4	3	0	0	1	8	4	+4	9	
6	B	Ross County	4	2	0	1	1	11	4	+7	7	
7	A	Cove Rangers	4	2	0	1	1	5	2	+3	7	
8	F	Raith Rovers	4	2	0	0	2	13	9	+4	6	

Rules for classification: 1) goal difference, 2) goals scored, 3) away goals scored, 4) matches won, 5) away matches won, 6) drawing of lots.

== Knockout phase ==
=== Second round ===
==== Draw and seeding ====
Celtic, Rangers, Aberdeen, Hibernian and Dundee United entered the competition at this stage, due to their participation in UEFA club competitions.

The draw for the second round was made following the St Mirren v Ayr United match on 27 July 2025, and broadcast live on Premier Sports 1.

Teams in bold advanced to the quarter-finals.

Seeded	Unseeded
**Aberdeen**; **Celtic**; Dundee United; Heart of Midlothian; **Hibernian**; **Partick Thistle**†; **Rangers**; St Johnstone†	Alloa Athletic*; Ayr United†; Falkirk; Greenock Morton†; **Kilmarnock**; Livingston; **Motherwell**; **St Mirren**

Notes

- † denotes teams playing in the Championship.
- * denotes team playing in League One.

==== Matches ====
15 August 2025	**Celtic**	**4–1**	Falkirk	Glasgow
19:45	Maeda 26'; Johnston 54'; Murray 61'; Henderson 64' (o.g.)		Adams 67'	Stadium: Celtic Park; Attendance: 46,063; Referee: Lloyd Wilson

16 August 2025	Greenock Morton	**0–3**	**Aberdeen**	Greenock
15:00			Nilsen 32'; Yengi 37'; Clarkson 79'	Stadium: Cappielow; Attendance: 4,885; Referee: Matthew MacDermid

16 August 2025	**Partick Thistle**	**2–0**	Ayr United	Glasgow
15:00	O'Reilly 41'; Chalmers 45'			Stadium: Firhill Stadium; Attendance: 3,124; Referee: Ryan Lee

16 August 2025	St Johnstone	**0–1** (a.e.t.)	**Motherwell**	Perth
15:00			Fadinger 109'	Stadium: McDiarmid Park; Attendance: 4,330; Referee: David Dickinson

16 August 2025	**St Mirren**	**1–1** (a.e.t.) (**5–4** p)	Heart of Midlothian	Paisley
15:00	Gogić 34'		McEntee 78'	Stadium: St Mirren Park; Attendance: 4,738; Referee: Steven McLean
	**Penalties**
	King (penalty scored); Fraser (penalty scored); Idowu (penalty scored); Mooney (penalty scored); Dijksteel (penalty scored)		Shankland (penalty scored); Kingsley (penalty scored); Braga (penalty missed); Forrest (penalty scored); Baningime (penalty scored)

16 August 2025	**Rangers**	**4–2**	Alloa Athletic	Glasgow
17:45	Bajrami 13'; Fernandez 28'; Tavernier 67' (pen.); Curtis 90'		Rothwell 25' (o.g.); Taggart 80'	Stadium: Ibrox Stadium; Attendance: 33,959; Referee: Dan McFarlane

17 August 2025	**Kilmarnock**	**2–1**	Dundee United	Kilmarnock
15:00	Dackers 6'; Lyons 69'		Stirton 25'	Stadium: Rugby Park; Attendance: 4,853; Referee: Kevin Clancy

17 August 2025	Livingston	**0–2**	**Hibernian**	Livingston
15:00			Klidjé 43'; Mulligan 87'	Stadium: Almondvale Stadium; Attendance: 4,696; Referee: Ross Hardie

=== Quarter-finals ===
==== Draw and seeding ====
The draw for the quarter-finals was made following the Rangers v Alloa Athletic match on 16 August 2025, and broadcast live on Premier Sports 1.

Teams in Italics were not known at the time of the draw.

Teams in bold advanced to the semi-finals.

Premiership	Championship
Aberdeen; **Celtic**; Hibernian; Kilmarnock; **Motherwell**; **Rangers**; **St Mirren**	Partick Thistle

==== Matches ====
19 September 2025	Kilmarnock	**2–2** (a.e.t.) (**3–5** p)	**St Mirren**	Kilmarnock
19:45	Deas 44'; Anderson 86' (pen.)		Mandron 25'; Richardson 59'	Stadium: Rugby Park; Attendance: 7,192; Referee: David Dickinson
	**Penalties**
	Anderson (penalty scored); Watkins (penalty scored); Thompson (penalty scored); Magennis (penalty missed)		King (penalty scored); Idowu (penalty scored); Donnelly (penalty scored); Nlundulu (penalty scored); Dijksteel (penalty scored)

20 September 2025	Aberdeen	**0–1**	**Motherwell**	Aberdeen
15:00			Charles-Cook 63'	Stadium: Pittodrie Stadium; Attendance: 10,533; Referee: John Beaton

20 September 2025	**Rangers**	**2–0**	Hibernian	Glasgow
17:45	Raskin 42'; Miovski 45'			Stadium: Ibrox Stadium; Attendance: 34,682; Referee: Nick Walsh

21 September 2025	Partick Thistle	**0–4**	**Celtic**	Glasgow
15:30			Yang 26'; Scales 28'; Tounetki 46'; McCowan 79'	Stadium: Firhill Stadium; Attendance: 8,817; Referee: Kevin Clancy

=== Semi-finals ===
==== Draw and seeding ====
The draw for the semi-finals was made following the Partick Thistle v Celtic match on 21 September 2025 and was broadcast live on Premier Sports 1.

Teams in bold advanced to the final.

- **Celtic**
- Motherwell
- Rangers
- **St Mirren**

==== Matches ====
1 November 2025	Motherwell	**1–4**	**St Mirren**	Glasgow
17:30	Hendry 83'		Mandron 25', 89'; Nlundulu 40'; King 86'	Stadium: Hampden Park; Attendance: 21,277; Referee: Don Robertson

2 November 2025	**Celtic**	**3–1** (a.e.t.)	Rangers	Glasgow
14:00	Kenny 25'; McGregor 93'; Osmand 109'		Tavernier 81' (pen.)	Stadium: Hampden Park; Attendance: 49,446; Referee: Nick Walsh

=== Final ===
14 December 2025	**St Mirren**	**3–1**	**Celtic**	Glasgow
15:30	Fraser 2'; Ayunga 64', 76'		Hatate 23'	Stadium: Hampden Park; Attendance: 49,914; Referee: Kevin Clancy

== Media coverage ==
The domestic broadcasting rights for the competition were held exclusively by Premier Sports, who broadcast between 12 and 16 live matches per season, as well as highlights. Premier Sports further announced they would stream up to 25 additional games from the group stage on their website. The broadcaster also broadcast all games live from the second round onwards, either streamed or televised, subject to blackout rules.

The following matches were broadcast live:

Round	Date	Match
Group stage	12 July 2025 (Matchday 1)	Arbroath v St Mirren (streamed); Brechin City v Falkirk (streamed); Brora Rangers v Kilmarnock (streamed); Clyde v Motherwell (streamed); Dundee v Airdrieonians (streamed); East Kilbride v St Johnstone (streamed); Heart of Midlothian v Dunfermline Athletic
Group stage	15 July 2025 (Matchday 2)	Forfar Athletic v St Mirren (streamed); Hamilton Academical v Heart of Midlothian (streamed); Motherwell v Peterhead (streamed); Kilmarnock v Livingston (16 July 2025)
Group stage	19 July 2025 (Matchday 3)	Alloa Athletic v Dundee (streamed); St Mirren v Annan Athletic (streamed); Inverness Caledonian Thistle v St Johnstone (streamed); Stenhousemuir v Motherwell (streamed); Livingston v Brora Rangers (streamed); Stirling Albion v Heart of Midlothian
Group stage	22 July 2025 (Matchday 4)	Falkirk v Queen's Park (streamed); Kelty Hearts v Kilmarnock (streamed); Partick Thistle v Queen of the South (streamed); St Johnstone v Raith Rovers (streamed); Motherwell v Greenock Morton; Heart of Midlothian v Dumbarton (23 July 2025) (streamed)
Group stage	26 July 2025 (Matchday 5)	Dundee v Montrose (streamed); Falkirk v The Spartans (streamed); Kilmarnock v East Fife (streamed); Livingston v Kelty Hearts (streamed); Ross County v Partick Thistle (streamed); St Johnstone v Elgin City (streamed); St Mirren v Ayr United (27 July 2025)
Second round	15 August 2025	Celtic v Falkirk
Second round	16 August 2025	Greenock Morton v Aberdeen (streamed); Partick Thistle v Ayr United (streamed); St Johnstone v Motherwell (streamed); St Mirren v Heart of Midlothian (streamed); Rangers v Alloa Athletic
Second round	17 August 2025	Kilmarnock v Dundee United (streamed); Livingston v Hibernian (streamed)
Quarter-Finals	19 September 2025	Kilmarnock v St Mirren (streamed)
Quarter-Finals	20 September 2025	Aberdeen v Motherwell; Rangers v Hibernian
Quarter-Finals	21 September 2025	Partick Thistle v Celtic
Semi-Finals	1 November 2025	Motherwell v St Mirren
Semi-Finals	2 November 2025	Celtic v Rangers
Final	14 December 2025	St Mirren v Celtic
