= Max Stryjek =

Polish footballer (born 1996)

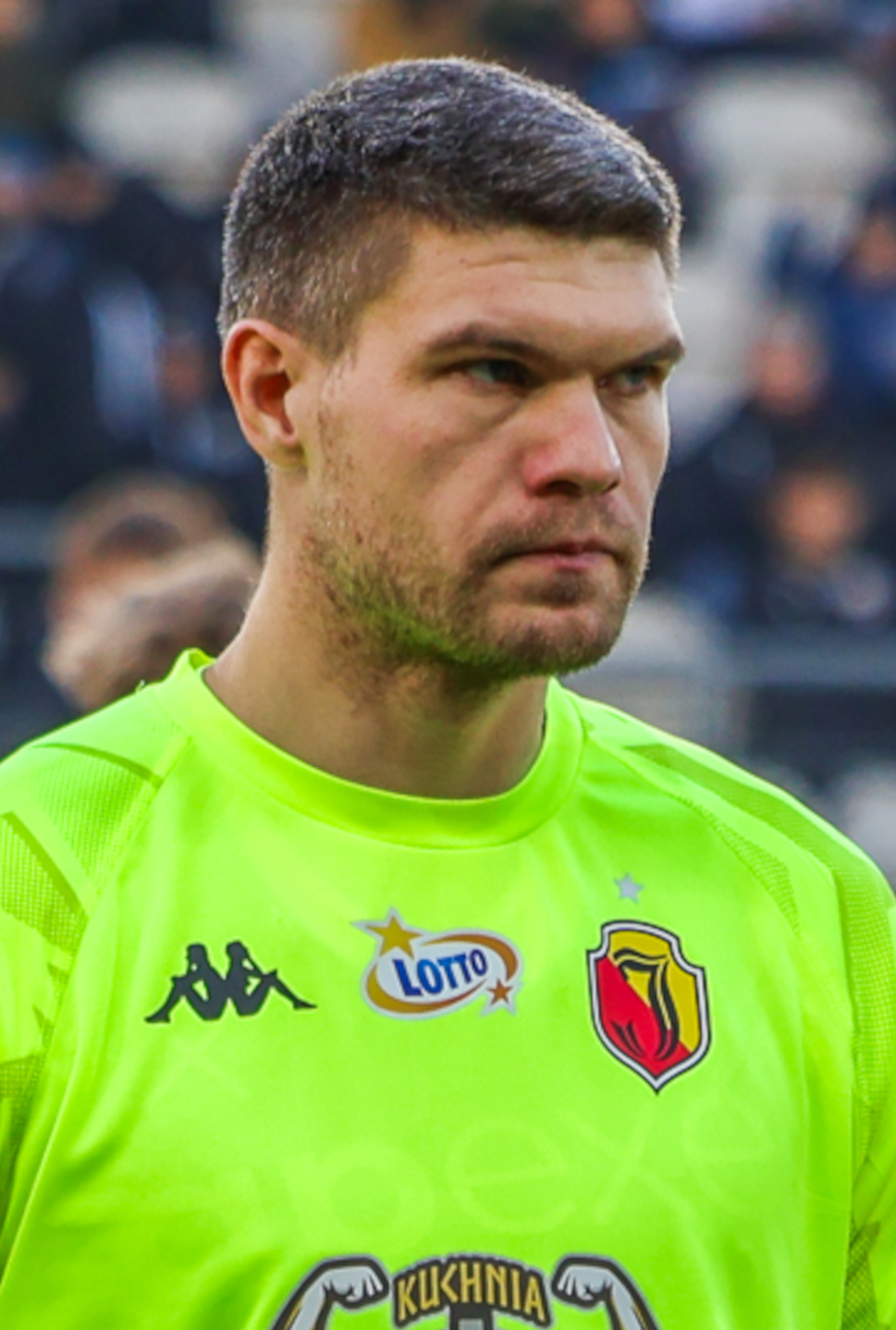
- Stryjek with Jagiellonia Białystok in 2024

Personal information
- Full name: Maksymilian Stryjek
- Date of birth: 18 July 1996 (age 30)
- Place of birth: Warsaw, Poland
- Height: 1.88 m (6 ft 2 in)
- Position: Goalkeeper

Team information
- Current team: Kilmarnock
- Number: 1

Youth career
- 2001–2007: Agrykola Warsaw
- 2007–2013: Polonia Warsaw
- 2013–2015: Sunderland

Senior career*
Years	Team	Apps	(Gls)
2015–2019	Sunderland	0	(0)
2015	→ Boston United (loan)	12	(0)
2017–2018	→ Accrington Stanley (loan)	1	(0)
2018	→ Eastleigh (loan)	13	(0)
2019–2020	Eastleigh	37	(0)
2020–2022	Livingston	57	(0)
2022–2024	Wycombe Wanderers	74	(0)
2024	→ Crewe Alexandra (loan)	3	(0)
2024–2025	Jagiellonia Białystok	3	(0)
2024	Jagiellonia Białystok II	2	(0)
2025–	Kilmarnock	18	(0)

International career
2012–2013	Poland U17	6	(0)
2013–2014	Poland U18	7	(0)
2014	Poland U19	2	(0)
- * Club domestic league appearances and goals as of 20:59, 15 September 2026 (UTC)

Maksymilian Stryjek (born 18 July 1996) is a Polish professional footballer who plays as a goalkeeper for Scottish Premiership club Kilmarnock. He was a Poland youth international.

== Club career ==
Born in Warsaw, Stryjek began playing football for his school at the age of 6. He signed for Polonia Warsaw at the age of 11. He moved to English club Sunderland in 2013, following a trial with the club.

He spent a loan spell with Boston United in 2015, making 10 league and 2 cup appearances for them. In February 2016 he signed a new contract with Sunderland, lasting until 2019, and in July 2017 he made his senior debut for the club, in a friendly game. He moved on loan to Accrington Stanley on transfer deadline day, 31 August 2017. He was injured 9 minutes into his professional debut, on 2 September 2017.

On 21 September, Stryjek joined National League side Eastleigh on a one-month loan to replace the recently retired Graham Stack. On 11 June 2019, Sunderland announced that Stryjek was to leave the club when his contract expired at the end of that month.

On 1 July 2019, Stryjek returned to Eastleigh, this time on a one-year deal. He returned home to Poland as the season was terminated and he was released due to the COVID-19 outbreak. After a successful trial he signed for Scottish Premiership club Livingston on 20 July 2020 on a three-year deal.

On 18 August 2022, he signed for EFL League One side Wycombe Wanderers. On 24 February 2024, Styjek was red-carded in Wycombe's 1–0 defeat at Stevenage. It was his 82nd and last appearance for the Chairboys.

On 13 April 2024, he signed on an emergency loan for Crewe Alexandra. While on loan at Crewe, Wycombe announced on 2 May 2024 that Stryjek would be released by the club when his contract expired in June 2024. Stryjek kept his first clean sheet for Crewe in their League Two play-off semi-final at Doncaster on 10 May, helping the side to a 2–2 aggregate draw, then saving twice in the penalty shoot-out that Crewe won 4–3.

Stryjek's stay in the United Kingdom came to an end after over eleven years; on 19 June 2024, the defending Polish Ekstraklasa champions Jagiellonia Białystok announced the signing of Stryjek on a two-year contract, with an extension option, effective from 1 July. His first match for Jagiellonia Białystok II was on 10 August 2024 in a 2–3 loss against Wisła II Płock, and he debuted for Jagiellonia's main team in a 3–0 loss against Ajax Amsterdam in the UEFA Europa League on 29 August 2024.

He debuted in the Ekstraklasa on 1 September 2024 in a 1–0 home victory over Widzew Łódź, keeping a clean sheet.

On 4 July 2025, Stryjek returned to Scotland to join Kilmarnock for an undisclosed fee.

== International career ==
Stryjek has represented Poland at under-17, under-18, and under-19 youth international levels. In March 2017 he was called up by the under-21 team for the first time, and went to the U21 Euro's in June.

== Career statistics ==
As of match played 15 September 2026

Appearances and goals by club, season and competition
Club	Season	League			National cup (Note: Includes FA Cup, Polish Cup)		League cup (Note: Includes EFL Cup)		Other		Total	
Club	Season	Division	Apps	Goal	Apps	Goals	Apps	Goals	Apps	Goals	Apps	Goals
Sunderland	2014–15	Premier League	0	0	0	0	0	0	0	0	0	0
Sunderland	2015–16	Premier League	0	0	0	0	0	0	0	0	0	0
Sunderland	2016–17	Premier League	0	0	0	0	0	0	0	0	0	0
Sunderland	2017–18	Championship	0	0	0	0	0	0	0	0	0	0
Sunderland	2018–19	League One	0	0	0	0	0	0	0	0	0	0
Sunderland	Total		0	0	0	0	0	0	0	0	0	0
Boston United (loan)	2014–15	Conference North	12	0	0	0	—		0	0	12	0
Accrington Stanley (loan)	2017–18	League Two	1	0	0	0	0	0	2 (Note: Appearances in EFL Trophy)	0	3	0
Eastleigh (loan)	2018–19	National League	13	0	0	0	—		1 (Note: Appearance in FA Trophy)	0	14	0
Eastleigh	2019–20	National League	37	0	6	0	—		0	0	43	0
Livingston	2020–21	Scottish Premiership	22	0	1	0	5	0	—		28	0
Livingston	2021–22	Scottish Premiership	35	0	2	0	5	0	—		42	0
Livingston	2022–23	Scottish Premiership	0	0	0	0	1	0	—		1	0
Livingston	Total		57	0	3	0	11	0	0	0	71	0
Wycombe Wanderers	2022–23	League One	41	0	1	0	0	0	2	0	44	0
Wycombe Wanderers	2023–24	League One	33	0	1	0	2	0	2	0	38	0
Wycombe Wanderers	Total		74	0	2	0	2	0	4	0	82	0
Crewe Alexandra (loan)	2023–24	League Two	3	0	0	0	0	0	3 (Note: Appearances in the play-offs)	0	6	0
Jagiellonia Białystok	2024–25	Ekstraklasa	3	0	1	0	—		1 (Note: Appearance in UEFA Europa League)	0	5	0
Jagiellonia Białystok II	2024–25	III liga, group I	2	0	—		—		—		2	0
Kilmarnock	2025–26	Scottish Premiership	12	0	0	0	4	0	—		16	0
Kilmarnock	2026–27	Scottish Premiership	6	0	0	0	5	0	—		11	0
Kilmarnock	Total		18	0	0	0	9	0	0	0	27	0
Career total			220	0	12	0	22	0	11	0	265	0

== Honours ==
Wycombe Wanderers

- EFL Trophy runner-up: 2023–24
