= Dominic Thompson (footballer) =

English footballer (born 2000)

Personal information
- Full name: Dominic Lewis Thompson
- Date of birth: 26 July 2000 (age 26)
- Place of birth: Willesden, England
- Height: 6 ft 0 in (1.83 m)
- Position: Left-back

Team information
- Current team: Beveren
- Number: 2

Youth career
- 2012–2019: Arsenal

Senior career*
Years	Team	Apps	(Gls)
2019–2022	Brentford	8	(0)
2021	→ Swindon Town (loan)	25	(0)
2022	→ Ipswich Town (loan)	17	(0)
2022–2025	Blackpool	36	(0)
2024	→ Forest Green Rovers (loan)	19	(1)
2025	Motherwell	15	(0)
2025–2026	Kilmarnock	36	(0)
2026–	Beveren	1	(0)
- * Club domestic league appearances and goals as of 22:36, 12 August 2026 (UTC)

Dominic Lewis Thompson (born 26 July 2000) is an English professional footballer who plays as a left-back for Belgian Pro League club Beveren.

Thompson is a graduate of the Arsenal academy and began his senior career with Brentford in 2019. He appeared sparingly before transferring to Blackpool in 2022. After falling out of favour in 2025, Thompson played 18 months in Scotland for Motherwell and then Kilmarnock. He transferred to Belgian club Beveren in 2026.

== Club career ==
=== Arsenal ===
After beginning his career as a central midfielder, a six-week trial with Arsenal led to Thompson signing a two-year schoolboy contract with the club in May 2012. He was developed as a left-back and progressed through the Hale End Academy to sign a professional contract in June 2018. During the 2018–19 season, he was an unused substitute with the EFL Trophy squad on four occasions and was a travelling reserve for the first team's dead rubber Europa League group stage match versus FC Vorskla Poltava in November 2018. Thompson failed to win a call into a first team squad before his departure in August 2019.

=== Brentford ===
On 7 August 2019, Thompson joined Championship club Brentford on a three-year contract, with the option of a further year, for an undisclosed fee, reported to be "an initial £3 million". Behind ever-present Rico Henry in the left-back pecking order, he made five appearances during the 2019–20 season. Thompson again served as backup to Rico Henry during the first half of the 2020–21 season and made 9 appearances before joining League One club Swindon Town on loan until the end of the 2020–21 season on 4 January 2021. Five days later, he made his debut with a start in a league match versus Ipswich Town and assisted each of Swindon's goals in the 3–2 win. He made 25 appearances during the remainder of a season which culminated in relegation to League Two. After returning to Brentford at the end of the regular season, Thompson was ineligible to play during the club's successful play-off campaign.

Despite appearing in all but one of Brentford's 2021–22 pre-season matches, Thompson was confined to making EFL Cup appearances during the early months of the regular season. He was a regular inclusion on the substitutes' bench for Premier League matches and due to a hamstring problem suffered by Rico Henry, Thompson made three starting appearances at left wing back around the turn of the year. On 27 January 2022, the one-year extension on Thompson's contract was triggered and he joined League One club Ipswich Town on loan until the end of the season. He ended his spell at Portman Road with 17 appearances. Ahead of the 2022–23 season, Thompson was not called into Brentford's pre-season training camp in Germany and he transferred out of the club on 25 July 2022. Thompson made 19 appearances during three seasons with Brentford.

=== Blackpool ===
On 25 July 2022, Thompson transferred to Championship club Blackpool and signed a three-year contract, with a one-year option, for an undisclosed fee. He made 30 appearances during a 2022–23 season which culminated in relegation to League One. Behind Owen Dale and Andy Lyons in the left-sided pecking order, Thompson was restricted to 12 appearances by the midpoint of the 2023–24 season. Following the loan signing of left-sided player Hayden Coulson in January 2024, Thompson joined League Two club Forest Green Rovers on loan for the remainder of the 2023–24 season. He made 19 appearances during his spell, which culminated in relegation to the National League. Thompson scored his first senior goal on his fourth appearance, with the third goal in a 3–3 draw with Colchester United on 3 February 2024.

An injury suffered while on loan during the second half of the 2023–24 season required Thompson to undergo surgery during the 2024 off-season, which saw him miss the opening month of the 2024–25 season. He made 9 appearances during the first half of the 2024–25 season, before his contract was terminated by mutual consent on 24 January 2025. Thompson made 51 appearances during his 2 1/2 years at Bloomfield Road.

=== Motherwell ===
On 25 January 2025, Thompson signed a contract running until the end of the 2024–25 season with Scottish Premiership club Motherwell, on a free transfer. He made 15 appearances during the remainder of the season. Thompson entered discussions over a new contract at the end of the season, which proved fruitless. He then spent time as a free agent, recovering from surgery on a hip problem.

=== Kilmarnock ===
On 2 August 2025, Thompson signed a one-year contract with Scottish Premiership club Kilmarnock, on a free transfer. He made 39 appearances and scored one goal during the 2025–26 season. Thompson was retained for the 2026–27 season, but he elected to transfer out of the club in July 2026.

=== Beveren ===
On 27 July 2026, Thompson transferred to Belgian Pro League club Beveren and signed a two-year contract for an undisclosed fee.

== Personal life ==
Thompson is the son of Neville Thompson and his older brother is Greg Thompson, both of whom have competed in discus. He is an Arsenal supporter.

== Career statistics ==
As of match played 9 August 2026

Appearances and goals by club, season and competition
Club	Season	League			National cup (Note: Includes FA Cup, Belgian Cup)		League cup (Note: Includes EFL Cup)		Other		Total	
Club	Season	Division	Apps	Goals	Apps	Goals	Apps	Goals	Apps	Goals	Apps	Goals
Brentford	2019–20	Championship	2	0	2	0	1	0	0	0	5	0
Brentford	2020–21	Championship	4	0	0	0	5	0	—		9	0
Brentford	2021–22	Premier League	2	0	1	0	2	0	—		5	0
Brentford	Total		8	0	3	0	8	0	0	0	19	0
Swindon Town (loan)	2020–21	League One	25	0	—		—		—		25	0
Ipswich Town (loan)	2021–22	League One	17	0	—		—		—		17	0
Blackpool	2022–23	Championship	28	0	1	0	1	0	—		30	0
Blackpool	2023–24	League One	5	0	2	0	2	0	3 (Note: Appearances in EFL Trophy)	0	12	0
Blackpool	2024–25	League One	3	0	1	0	1	0	4	0	9	0
Blackpool	Total		36	0	4	0	4	0	7	0	51	0
Forest Green Rovers (loan)	2023–24	League Two	19	1	—		—		—		19	1
Motherwell	2024–25	Scottish Premiership	15	0	—		—		—		15	0
Kilmarnock	2025–26	Scottish Premiership	36	0	1	1	2	0	—		39	1
Kilmarnock B	2025–26	—							1 (Note: Appearance in Scottish Challenge Cup)	0	1	0
Beveren	2026–27	Belgian Pro League	1	0	0	0	—		—		1	0
Career total			157	1	8	1	14	0	8	0	187	2
