= 2026–27 SK Beveren season =

- Manager: Tim Bakens
- Stadium: Freethiel Stadion
- Belgian Pro League: Pre-season
- Belgian Cup: Pre-season

The 2026–27 season is the 91st season in the history of Sportkring Beveren and their first season back in the Belgian top division since 2021. The club will also participate in the Belgian Cup.

== Pre-season and friendlies ==
| 1 July 2026 Friendly | PAOK (Greece) | 4–1 | (Belgium) Beveren |
| 17:00 | 9'; 53'; 62'; 87' | | 40' |

| 4 July 2026 Friendly | KSK Beveren (Belgium) | 1–8 | (Belgium) Beveren |
| 17:00 | 28' | | 7'; 30'; 42'; 55'; 56'; 74'; 81'; 90' |

| 8 July 2026 Friendly | Genk (Belgium) | 2–1 | (Belgium) Beveren |
| 14:00 | Mirisola 38'; Kim Myung-jun 49' | | Sayala 88' |

== Competitions ==
=== Overall record ===
| Competition | Starting round | Record | | | | | | | |
| Competition | Starting round | Pld | W | D | L | GF | GA | GD | Win % |
|---|---|---|---|---|---|---|---|---|---|
| Belgian Pro League | Matchday 1 | 0 | 0 | 0 | 0 | 0 | 0 | +0 | — |
| Belgian Cup | | 0 | 0 | 0 | 0 | 0 | 0 | +0 | — |
| Total | | 0 | 0 | 0 | 0 | 0 | 0 | +0 | — |

Source: Competitions

=== Belgian Pro League ===
| Pos | Team | Pld | W | D | L | GF | GA | GD | Pts | Qualification or relegation |
|---|---|---|---|---|---|---|---|---|---|---|
| 1 | Anderlecht | 0 | 0 | 0 | 0 | 0 | 0 | 0 | 0 | Qualification for the Champions League league phase |
| 2 | Antwerp | 0 | 0 | 0 | 0 | 0 | 0 | 0 | 0 | Qualification for the Champions League third qualifying round |
| 3 | Beveren | 0 | 0 | 0 | 0 | 0 | 0 | 0 | 0 | Qualification for the Europa League second qualifying round |
| 4 | Cercle Brugge | 0 | 0 | 0 | 0 | 0 | 0 | 0 | 0 | Qualification for the Conference League second qualifying round |
| 5 | Charleroi | 0 | 0 | 0 | 0 | 0 | 0 | 0 | 0 | |

Updated to match(es) played on 7 August 2026. Source: Jupiler Pro League (in Dutch)
Rules for classification: 1) Points; 2) Matches won; 3) Goal difference; 4) Goals scored; 5) Away matches won; 6) Away goal difference; 7) Away goals scored; 8) Play-off.
