= Aaron Tshibola =

Congolese footballer (born 1995)

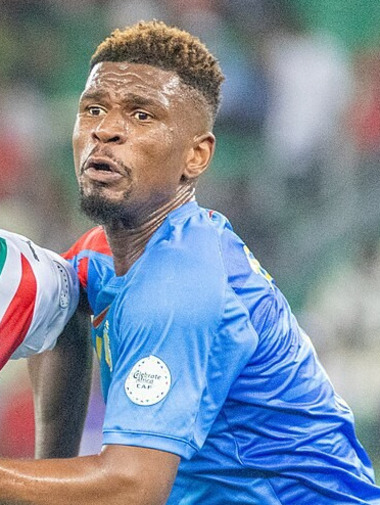
- Tshibola in 2024

Personal information
- Full name: Aaron Tshibola
- Date of birth: 2 January 1995 (age 31)
- Place of birth: Beckton, Newham, England
- Height: 1.90 m (6 ft 3 in)
- Position: Defensive midfielder

Team information
- Current team: Kilmarnock
- Number: 36

Youth career
- 2008–2013: Reading

Senior career*
Years	Team	Apps	(Gls)
2013–2016	Reading	13	(0)
2015	→ Hartlepool United (loan)	23	(0)
2016–2019	Aston Villa	8	(1)
2017	→ Nottingham Forest (loan)	4	(0)
2017	→ Milton Keynes Dons (loan)	12	(0)
2018–2019	→ Kilmarnock (loan)	39	(1)
2019–2020	Waasland Beveren	8	(0)
2020	Aves	4	(0)
2020–2021	Kilmarnock	31	(3)
2021–2022	Gençlerbirliği	27	(2)
2022–2023	AEL Limassol	22	(2)
2023–2024	Hatta	18	(0)
2025	Lamia	12	(2)
2025–2026	Levadiakos	10	(0)
2026–	Kilmarnock	19	(0)

International career^{‡}
2013	England U18	1	(0)
2018–	DR Congo	18	(1)
- * Club domestic league appearances and goals as of 19 September 2026 ‡ National team caps and goals as of 23:13, 2 October 2026 (UTC)

Aaron Tshibola (born 2 January 1995) is a professional footballer who plays as a defensive midfielder for Scottish Premiership club Kilmarnock. Born in England, he represents the DR Congo national team.

Born in London, he came through the youth ranks at Reading before moving to Aston Villa in 2016. He has had loan spells at English Football League sides Hartlepool United, Nottingham Forest and Milton Keynes Dons, as well as Scottish Premiership side Kilmarnock. He has also played in Belgium for Waasland Beveren and in Portugal for Aves.

== Early life ==
Tshibola was born in the London Borough of Newham in England.

== Club career ==
=== Reading ===
Tshibola joined Reading's academy at age thirteen and signed his first professional deal with the club in March 2011. While in the Reading Academy, Tshibola went on trial with Manchester United.

Ahead of the 2014–15 season, Tshibola signed a new contract with Reading, keeping him at the club until 2016. Then on 23 August 2014, he made his professional debut as an 86th-minute substitute in a Championship fixture against Nottingham Forest.

On 9 September 2015, Tshibola extended his contract with Reading until the summer of 2019.

On 2 January 2015, he moved to League Two side Hartlepool United on a one-month loan deal, before making his debut the next day in a 1–0 loss against Wycombe Wanderers. His first four appearances at the club earned Tshibola a loan extension until the end of the season. His loan spell extension led manager Ronnie Moore to thank Tshibola for his commitment at Hartlepool United. He was then awarded Man of the match, in a 3–2 win over Plymouth Argyle after an impressive performance when he assisted one of the goals in the game.

=== Aston Villa ===
On 10 July 2016, Tshibola moved to Aston Villa on a four-year contract, for an undisclosed fee. He scored his first goal for the club in a 1–1 draw with Newcastle United on 24 September 2016. On 30 January 2017, Tshibola moved to Nottingham Forest on loan for the remainder of the 2016–17 season.

On 27 July 2017, Tshibola joined EFL League One side Milton Keynes Dons on a season-long loan deal. He scored his first goal for MK Dons in an EFL Trophy tie against Brighton & Hove Albion Under-23s on 29 August 2017. On 9 November 2017, he returned to Aston Villa following the mutual termination of his loan with Milton Keynes Dons.

=== Kilmarnock ===
Tshibola was loaned to Scottish Premiership club Kilmarnock in January 2018, working under his former Reading manager Steve Clarke. He made his debut for Killie on 3 February 2018, as a 65th-minute substitute for Kris Boyd in the Ayrshire side's 1–0 win over Scottish Premiership Champions Celtic. Tshibola scored his first Kilmarnock goal in the 4–0 Scottish Cup win over Brora Rangers the following week. After six months, he returned to Aston Villa, only to be loaned back out to Kilmarnock for another season on 29 August 2018.

=== Waasland Beveren ===
On 29 August 2019, Tshibola signed for Belgian club Waasland Beveren for an undisclosed fee. On 19 October 2019, he made his debut in a 2–0 defeat to Gent.

=== Aves ===
On 31 January 2020, Tshibola signed for Portuguese side Aves on a one-and-a-half-year contract. On 1 March 2020, he made his debut, coming on as substitute in a 3–1 defeat to Paços de Ferreira. He made one other appearance in a 2–0 defeat to Sporting CP before the league was suspended due to the COVID-19 pandemic in Portugal.

On 13 July 2020, Tshibola announced on his Twitter account that due to financial difficulties at the club, he had left Aves and was a free agent once again.

=== Kilmarnock ===
On 31 July 2020, Tshibola returned for a third spell with Kilmarnock, signing a one-year contract. He left Kilmarnock at the end of the 2020–21 season.

=== Gençlerbirliği ===
In July 2021, Tshibola signed for Turkish side Gençlerbirliği. He made his debut playing 90 minutes of a 0–0 draw with Adanaspor. On 19 December 2021, he scored his first goal in Turkish football, in a 5–0 victory over Menemenspor.

=== AEL Limassol ===
On 12 August 2022, Cypriot First Division club AEL Limassol announced that Tshibola had joined the club. He made his debut of the club on 28 August 2022, in a 2–1 away defeat to local rivals Aris Limassol. He scored his first goal in Cyprus on 28 October 2022, in a 3–0 victory over Akritas Chlorakas.

=== Hatta Club ===
In August 2023, Tshibola joined newly promoted UAE Pro League team Hatta Club for a €150,000 fee.

After half a season with Lamia, Tshibola joined Greek Super League club Levadiakos in June 2025.

=== Kilmarnock (fourth spell) ===
On 2 February 2026, Tshibola returned to Scottish Premiership club Kilmarnock on a permanent deal.

== International career ==
Tshibola was called up by England U18 and made his debut, coming on as a substitute in the second half, in a 1–0 loss against Belgium on 5 March 2013.

He is also eligible to represent DR Congo national team due to his ancestry. He was called up to the DR Congo national team for a friendly against Kenya on 26 March 2017, but did not make an appearance. On 27 March 2018, he finally made his senior international debut for DR Congo, playing 45 minutes in a friendly against Tanzania.

Tshibola was called up to the DR Congo squad for the 2026 FIFA World Cup on 20 May 2026, replacing the injured Rocky Bushiri.

== Career statistics ==
=== Club ===
As of match played 19 September 2026

Appearance and goals by club, season and competition
Club	Season	League			National cup		League Cup		Other		Total	
Club	Season	Division	Apps	Goals	Apps	Goals	Apps	Goals	Apps	Goals	Apps	Goals
Reading	2013–14	Championship	0	0	0	0	0	0	—		0	0
Reading	2014–15	Championship	1	0	0	0	0	0	—		1	0
Reading	2015–16	Championship	12	0	1	0	3	0	—		16	0
Reading	Total		13	0	1	0	3	0	0	0	17	0
Hartlepool United (loan)	2014–15	League Two	23	0	0	0	0	0	0	0	23	0
Aston Villa	2016–17	Championship	8	1	1	0	1	0	—		10	1
Aston Villa	2017–18	Championship	0	0	0	0	0	0	—		0	0
Aston Villa	Total		8	1	1	0	1	0	0	0	10	1
Nottingham Forest (loan)	2016–17	Championship	4	0	0	0	0	0	—		4	0
Milton Keynes Dons (loan)	2017–18	League One	12	0	0	0	2	0	2 (Note: Appearances in the EFL Trophy)	1	16	1
Kilmarnock (loan)	2017–18	Scottish Premiership	12	0	2	1	0	0	—		14	1
Kilmarnock (loan)	2018–19	Scottish Premiership	27	1	2	0	0	0	—		29	1
Kilmarnock (loan)	Total		39	1	4	1	0	0	0	0	43	2
Waasland-Beveren	2019–20	Belgian First Division A	8	0	1	0	—		—		9	0
Aves	2019–20	Primeira Liga	4	0	0	0	0	0	—		4	0
Kilmarnock	2020–21	Scottish Premiership	30	3	3	0	0	0	—		33	3
Gençlerbirliği	2021–22	TFF First League	19	1	0	0	—		—		19	1
AEL Limassol	2022–23	Cypriot First Division	22	2	4	0	—		—		26	2
Hatta	2023–24	UAE Pro League	18	0	0	0	2	1	—		20	1
Lamia	2024–25	Super League Greece	12	2	—		—		—		12	2
Levadiakos	2025–26	Super League Greece	10	0	5	0	—		—		15	0
Kilmarnock	2025–26	Scottish Premiership	14	0	—		—		—		14	0
Kilmarnock	2026–27	Scottish Premiership	5	0	—		3	0	—		8	0
Kilmarnock	Total		19	0	—		3	0	—		22	0
Career total			239	10	18	1	12	1	2	1	273	13

=== International ===
As of match played 2 October 2026

Appearances and goals by national team and year
National team	Year	Apps	Goals
DR Congo	2018	1	0
DR Congo	2023	6	1
DR Congo	2024	9	0
DR Congo	2026	2	0
Total		18	1

Scores and results list DR Congo's goal tally first, score column indicates score after each Tshibola goal.

List of international goals scored by Aaron Tshibola
No.	Date	Venue	Opponent	Score	Result	Competition
1	19 June 2023	Franceville Stadium, Franceville, Gabon	Gabon	1–0	2–0	2023 Africa Cup of Nations qualification

== Honours ==
Reading U21

- U21 Premier League Cup: 2013–14

Gençlerbirliği

- TSYD Cup: 2021–22
