= Eddie Beach =

Welsh footballer (born 2003)

Personal information
- Full name: Edward James Beach
- Date of birth: 9 October 2003 (age 23)
- Place of birth: Lymington, England
- Height: 6 ft 5 in (1.95 m)
- Position: Goalkeeper

Team information
- Current team: Shelbourne
- Number: 19

Youth career
- Milford on Sea Youth
- 2013–2019: New Forest Football Academy
- 2019–2022: Southampton
- 2022–2023: Chelsea

Senior career*
Years	Team	Apps	(Gls)
2023–2025	Chelsea	0	(0)
2023	→ Chelmsford City (loan)	20	(0)
2024	→ Gateshead (loan)	5	(0)
2024–2025	→ Crawley Town (loan)	0	(0)
2025–2026	Kilmarnock	3	(0)
2026	→ Derry City (loan)	22	(0)
2026–	Shelbourne	11	(0)

International career^{‡}
2021	Wales U19	6	(0)
2023–2024	Wales U21	8	(0)
- * Club domestic league appearances and goals as of 19:47, 10 November 2026 (UTC) ‡ National team caps and goals as of 10 September 2024

Edward James Beach (born 9 October 2003) is a professional footballer who plays as a goalkeeper for League of Ireland Premier Division club Shelbourne. He is a former Wales under-21 international.

== Club career ==
=== Early career ===
Beach started his footballing career as a striker for his local Sunday league teams, Milford Youth and the New Forest Football Academy. At the age of fifteen, his father sent him a Twitter link regarding an open trial exclusively for goalkeepers, and he decided to attend. He was repeatedly invited back, having impressed, and was eventually offered a further trial at professional side Bournemouth. Having only attended the trial for three of the eight weeks, Beach returned to Sunday league level, scoring a hat-trick for his local side.

Fellow professional side Southampton also showed an interest in Beach, and sent scouts to watch him play for his local team in a Hampshire Cup game. He was playing in midfield in the game, with his dad telling scouts that Beach "wasn't a goalkeeper" when asked why. Despite this, he was still invited for an eight-week trial, and as with the Bournemouth trial, this was also cut short. However, unlike the Bournemouth trial, Southampton had offered Beach a place in the academy, and he joined at under-15 level.

He suffered an eleven-month long injury during his first couple of years with Southampton, returning in early 2020, just before the COVID-19 pandemic in the United Kingdom forced football to stop temporarily. He managed to impress during the time he spent in the academy, and signed a scholarship deal with Southampton in August 2020.

=== Chelsea ===
Beach's performances in Southampton's 2021–22 campaign, in which they won the Premier League South title and came second nationally to Manchester City, attracted the attention of Chelsea, and he made the move to West London in July 2022.

In January 2023, Beach was loaned to National League South side Chelmsford City.

In January 2024, Beach was loaned to National League side Gateshead.

In August 2024, Beach joined newly promoted League One side Crawley Town on a season-long loan deal. However, he returned to Chelsea on 14 January 2025. On 9 June 2025, it was announced that Beach would leave Chelsea after the end of the season.

=== Kilmarnock ===
On 11 July 2025, Beach joined Scottish Premiership club Kilmarnock on a two-year deal.

==== Derry City loan ====
On 19 February 2026, Beach signed for League of Ireland Premier Division club Derry City on loan until the summer, acting as short term cover for injured first choice goalkeeper Brian Maher. In early June 2026, Beach stated that he would be "happy to stay" at the club beyond his loan spell, but despite this, at the end of the month he returned to Kilmarnock after making 22 appearances for Derry City during his loan spell.

=== Shelbourne ===
On 20 July 2026, Beach signed for League of Ireland Premier Division side Shelbourne to help resolve a goalkeeping injury crisis at the club just days before the start of their UEFA Conference League campaign. On 6 August 2026, he saved a Mika Godts penalty in a 3–1 defeat to Ajax at the Johan Cruyff Arena in the UEFA Conference League.

== International career ==
Beach has represented Wales at under-19 and under-21 level.

== Career statistics ==
As of match played 30 October 2026

Appearances and goals by club, season and competition
Club	Season	League			National cup (Note: Includes FA Cup, Scottish Cup)		League cup (Note: Includes EFL Cup, Scottish League Cup)		Europe		Other		Total	
Club	Season	Division	Apps	Goals	Apps	Goals	Apps	Goals	Apps	Goals	Apps	Goals	Apps	Goals
Chelsea U21	2022–23	—			—		—		—		4 (Note: Appearances in EFL Trophy)	0	4	0
Chelsea U21	2023–24	—			—		—		—		3	0	3	0
Chelsea U21	Total		0	0	0	0	0	0	0	0	7	0	7	0
Chelsea	2022–23	Premier League	0	0	0	0	0	0	0	0	0	0	0	0
Chelmsford City (loan)	2022–23	National League South	20	0	0	0	–		–		1 (Note: Appearances in the FA Trophy)	0	21	0
Gateshead (loan)	2023–24	National League	5	0	0	0	–		–		0	0	5	0
Crawley Town (loan)	2024–25	League One	0	0	0	0	1	0	–		0	0	1	0
Kilmarnock	2025–26	Scottish Premiership	3	0	0	0	2	0	—		3 (Note: Appearances in the Scottish Challenge Cup)	0	8	0
Kilmarnock	2026–27	Scottish Premiership	–		—		0	0	—		—		0	0
Kilmarnock	Total		3	0	0	0	2	0	0	0	3	0	8	0
Derry City (loan)	2026	LOI Premier Division	22	0	—		—		—		—		22	0
Shelbourne	2026	LOI Premier Division	11	0	—		—		4 (Note: Appearances in the UEFA Conference League)	0	—		15	0
Career total			61	0	0	0	3	0	1	0	14	0	78	0
