= Jack Thomson (footballer, born 2000) =

Scottish footballer (born 2000)

Personal information
- Full name: Jack Michael Thomson
- Date of birth: 15 January 2000 (age 26)
- Place of birth: Glasgow, Scotland
- Height: 1.77 m (5 ft 10 in)
- Position: Midfielder

Team information
- Current team: Swindon Town
- Number: 25

Youth career
- Rangers

Senior career*
Years	Team	Apps	(Gls)
2018–2021	Rangers	0	(0)
2021	→ Clyde (loan)	13	(0)
2021	→ Orange County (loan)	0	(0)
2021–2022	→ Queen's Park (loan)	26	(2)
2022–2025	Queen's Park	80	(3)
2025–2026	Kilmarnock	16	(0)
2026–	Swindon Town	4	(0)

International career
2014	Scotland U15	1	(0)
2014	Scotland U16	1	(1)
- * Club domestic league appearances and goals as of 12 September 2026 (UTC)

Jack Michael Thomson (born 20 January 2000) is a Scottish professional footballer who plays as a central midfielder for EFL League Two side Swindon Town.

== Club career ==
=== Rangers ===
Jack Thomson began his career in Rangers’ youth system, representing the club's under-20 and B teams. In January 2021, as part of his development, he joined Clyde on loan and made 16 appearances in all competitions.

In May 2021, Orange County announced Thomson's loan signing. He was recalled two months later without having made an appearance for the California-based club and subsequently joined Queen's Park on loan.

=== Queen's Park ===
After helping Queen's Park secure promotion to the Scottish Championship in his first season, Thomson joined the club permanently in summer 2022. He remained there until 2025 having played over 100 times, although an Achilles injury ruled him out of their run to the Scottish Cup quarter-finals in the 2024–25 season.

=== Kilmarnock ===
Having signed a pre-contract in January 2025, Thomson joined Scottish Premiership club Kilmarnock on a two-year contract. He subsequently made 19 appearances across all competitions, although injuries and suspension restricted his playing time.

=== Swindon Town ===
in August 2026, Thomson signed for EFL League Two side Swindon Town on a two-year contract.

== International career ==
In September 2014, Thomson represented Scotland at under-15 level in a 2–1 win over Switzerland. Two months later, he was selected by Scot Gemmill for the under-16 Victory Shield match against England, scoring shortly after coming on as a half-time substitute in a 2–1 defeat.

== Career statistics ==
As of match played 12 September 2026

Appearances and goals by club, season and competition
Club	Season	League			National cup (Note: Includes Scottish Cup & FA Cup)		League cup		Other		Total	
Club	Season	Division	Apps	Goals	Apps	Goals	Apps	Goals	Apps	Goals	Apps	Goals
Rangers B	2019–20	—			—		—		3 (Note: Appearance(s) in Scottish Challenge Cup)	0	3	0
Clyde (loan)	2020–21	League Two	13	0	3	0	0	0	0	0	16	0
Orange County (loan)	2021	USL Championship	0	0	0	0	0	0	0	0	0	0
Queen's Park (loan)	2021–22	League Two	26	2	0	0	0	0	7 (Note: Appearances in the Scottish Championship play-offs)	0	33	2
Career total			72	2	3	0	0	0	10	0	85	3
Queen's Park	2022–23	Scottish Championship	33	2	1	0	4	0	3	0	41	2
Queen's Park	2023–24	Scottish Championship	34	0	1	0	4	0	2	0	41	0
Queen's Park	2024–25	Scottish Championship	13	0	1	0	5	0	0	0	19	0
Queen's Park	Total		0	0	0	0	0	0	0	0	0	0
Kilmarnock	2025–26	Scottish Premiership	16	0	1	0	2	0	0	0	19	0
Total			16	0	1	0	2	0	0	0	19	0
Swindon Town	2026–27	League Two	4	0	0	0	0	0	0	0	4	0
Total			4	0	0	0	0	0	0	0	4	0
Career total			139	5	7	0	15	0	18	0	179	5

== Honours ==
Queen's Park

- Championship play-offs: 2021–22
