= Tyreece John-Jules =

English footballer (born 2001)

Personal information
- Full name: Tyreece Romayo John-Jules
- Date of birth: 14 February 2001 (age 25)
- Place of birth: Westminster, England
- Height: 6 ft 0 in (1.83 m)
- Position: Striker

Team information
- Current team: Kilmarnock
- Number: 10

Youth career
- Charlton Athletic
- 2009–2019: Arsenal

Senior career*
Years	Team	Apps	(Gls)
2019–2024	Arsenal	0	(0)
2020	→ Lincoln City (loan)	7	(1)
2020–2021	→ Doncaster Rovers (loan)	18	(5)
2021–2022	→ Blackpool (loan)	11	(0)
2022	→ Sheffield Wednesday (loan)	1	(0)
2022–2023	→ Ipswich Town (loan)	17	(3)
2023–2024	→ Derby County (loan)	12	(1)
2024–2025	Crawley Town	25	(0)
2025–	Kilmarnock	32	(10)

International career^{‡}
2016–2017	England U16	4	(1)
2018	England U17	5	(1)
2018–2019	England U18	11	(9)
2019–2021	England U19	4	(0)
2021	England U21	2	(0)
- * Club domestic league appearances and goals as of 08:45, 22 November 2026 (UTC) ‡ National team caps and goals as of 14:55, 20 October 2025 (UTC)

Tyreece Romayo John-Jules (born 14 February 2001) is an English professional footballer who plays as a striker for Scottish Premiership club Kilmarnock.

He has previously played for Charlton Athletic and Arsenal before spending time on loan with Lincoln City, Doncaster Rovers, Blackpool, Sheffield Wednesday, Ipswich Town and Derby County. After his release from Arsenal he played for Crawley Town and Scottish club Kilmarnock.

== Early life ==
John-Jules was born in Westminster, Greater London. He began his football career with Charlton Athletic before joining Arsenal at the age of 8.

== Club career ==
=== Arsenal ===
John-Jules made his debut for Arsenal under-23s against Arsenal's North London derby rivals Tottenham Hotspur and scored in the match. He was part of the Arsenal under-18s team that reached the final of the 2017–18 FA Youth Cup.

John-Jules signed professional terms for Arsenal in 2018. In 2019, head coach Unai Emery selected him for the club's pre-season tour of the United States. He renewed his contract with the club in August 2019. Later in the year, he started to train with the first-team squad at the request of Freddie Ljungberg, Arsenal's under-23 manager who was then the acting first-team coach.

John-Jules was loaned to Lincoln City in January 2020. The move was made by Arsenal head coach Mikel Arteta in order for John-Jules to get first-team football in his preferred role as a striker. He made his Lincoln City debut against Shrewsbury Town. Lincoln City manager Michael Appleton praised John-Jules and said he could see him starting in Arsenal's first team in the future. He scored his first Football League goal against Blackpool in his next match. He was injured and ruled out for the rest of the season in March 2020. He subsequently returned to his parent club.

After his return to Arsenal, on 29 August 2020 John-Jules was an unused substitute in the 2020 FA Community Shield, in which Arsenal clinched a 5–4 penalty shootout victory over Liverpool after the match ended 1–1.

On 8 September 2020, John-Jules was loaned to Doncaster Rovers for the 2020–21 season. He scored his first goal for Doncaster in a 3–1 win against Charlton Athletic on 19 September 2020, for which he won the Goal of the Month for League One.

John-Jules joined Blackpool on a season-long loan on 29 July 2021. He returned from the loan on 17 January 2022.

On 25 January 2022, John-Jules joined Sheffield Wednesday on loan for the remainder of the season to team up with manager Darren Moore once again. He made his debut on 29 January, coming off the bench against Ipswich Town.

On 22 June 2022, John-Jules joined Ipswich Town on a season-long loan.

On 25 August 2023, John-Jules joined Derby County on loan until January 2024. After making his debut against Peterborough United on 26 August 2023, he picked up a thigh injury during the international break which ruled him out of the game at home to Portsmouth on 16 September 2023. John-Jules was out for two months with this injury, missing fifteen matches. He scored his first goal for Derby in his return appearance from injury, with his first touch after being a 76th-minute substitute against Port Vale on 28 November 2023, scoring a minute later in the 1–0 victory. Derby head coach Paul Warne was keen to extend John-Jules loan beyond its middle of January 2024 expiry, with Arsenal and Derby being in talks to do so. John-Jules started his first game for Derby on 6 January 2024, at Fleetwood Town. Later that month his loan was extended until the end of the season. On 23 January 2024, he left the field against Reading in pain from a "serious" injury; later in the week it was confirmed that he would out for foreseeable future with a severe hamstring tear which may require surgery, and that the spate of injuries during his loan spells was taking a toll on him mentally. On 8 February 2024, Warne confirmed that John-Jules had surgery on the injury, which ruled him out for the rest of the season. He also stated that John-Jules had returned to Arsenal for recovery and rehabilitation from said surgery. John-Jules returned to training at Derby in April with a chance of a possible return to action before the end of the season. He did not feature in any further games for Derby, however; he made a total of twelve appearances for Derby, scoring one goal, as they secured promotion to the Championship.

He was released by Arsenal at the end of the 2023–24 season following the expiration of his contract.

=== Crawley Town ===
On 18 October 2024, John-Jules joined League One club Crawley Town on a deal for the remainder of the 2024–25 season.

On 12 May 2025, Crawley announced he would be leaving the club in June when his contract expired.

=== Kilmarnock ===
He signed for Scottish club Kilmarnock in October 2025 on a short-term deal.

== International career ==
John-Jules has represented England at under-16, under-17, under-18 and under-19 level. In May 2018, John-Jules was a member of the side that hosted the 2018 UEFA European Under-17 Championship. The hosts were eliminated by the Netherlands at the semi-final stage on a penalty shootout with John-Jules scoring his spot kick.

On 7 September 2021, John-Jules made his England U21 debut during the 2–0 2023 UEFA European Under-21 Championship qualification win over Kosovo U21s at Stadium MK.

He is also eligible to both represent the Dominica national team, as both his paternal grandparents are from Dominica, and Barbados.

== Personal life ==
John-Jules is the nephew of actor Danny John-Jules, best known for playing Cat in the sci-fi comedy series Red Dwarf.

== Career statistics ==
As of match played 21 November 2026

Appearances and goals by club, season and competition
Club	Season	League			National cup		League cup		Other		Total	
Club	Season	Division	Apps	Goals	Apps	Goals	Apps	Goals	Apps	Goals	Apps	Goals
Arsenal	2019–20	Premier League	0	0	0	0	0	0	0	0	0	0
Arsenal	2020–21	Premier League	0	0	0	0	0	0	0	0	0	0
Arsenal	2021–22	Premier League	0	0	0	0	0	0	0	0	0	0
Arsenal	2022–23	Premier League	0	0	0	0	0	0	0	0	0	0
Arsenal	2023–24	Premier League	0	0	0	0	0	0	0	0	0	0
Arsenal	Total		0	0	0	0	0	0	0	0	0	0
Lincoln City (loan)	2019–20	League One	7	1	0	0	0	0	0	0	7	1
Doncaster Rovers (loan)	2020–21	League One	18	5	2	0	0	0	1	0	21	5
Blackpool (loan)	2021–22	Championship	11	0	0	0	1	0	–		12	0
Sheffield Wednesday (loan)	2021–22	League One	1	0	0	0	0	0	0	0	1	0
Ipswich Town (loan)	2022–23	League One	17	3	0	0	1	0	3 (Note: Appearance(s) in EFL Trophy)	0	21	3
Derby County (loan)	2023–24	League One	12	1	0	0	0	0	2	1	14	2
Crawley Town	2024–25	League One	25	0	1	0	0	0	1	0	27	0
Kilmarnock	2025–26	Scottish Premiership	18	8	1	0	0	0	0	0	19	8
Kilmarnock	2026–27	Scottish Premiership	14	2	0	0	6	1	0	0	20	3
Kilmarnock	Total		32	10	1	0	6	1	0	0	39	11
Career total			123	20	4	0	8	1	7	1	142	22

== Honours ==
Arsenal

- FA Community Shield: 2020

Ipswich Town

- EFL League One second-place promotion: 2022–23

Derby County

- EFL League One second-place promotion: 2023–24

Individual

- EFL League One Goal of the Month: September 2020
