= Nicky Cleșcenco =

Moldovan footballer

Personal information
- Full name: Nicky Serghei Cleșcenco
- Date of birth: 23 July 2001 (age 25)
- Place of birth: Dublin, Ireland
- Height: 1.77 m (5 ft 10 in)
- Position: Left winger

Team information
- Current team: Kilmarnock
- Number: 20

Youth career
- Dacia Buiucani
- Sporting CP
- –2019: União de Leiria

Senior career*
Years	Team	Apps	(Gls)
2019–2020	União de Leiria	6	(0)
2021–2025	Sion II	35	(8)
2023–2025	→ Petrocub Hîncești (loan)	24	(8)
2025–2026	Zimbru Chișinău	20	(4)
2026–	Kilmarnock	8	(2)

International career^{‡}
2019–2020	Moldova U21	10	(0)
2021–	Moldova	14	(1)
- * Club domestic league appearances and goals as of 29 September 2026 ‡ National team caps and goals as of 17 November 2026

Nicky Cleșcenco (born 23 July 2001) is a footballer who plays as a left winger for Scottish Premiership club Kilmarnock. Born in Ireland, he plays for the Moldova national team.

== Club career ==
Cleșcenco played for Dacia Buiucani in his youth, before moving to Portugal in 2014 to play for the academies of Sporting CP and União de Leiria. During the 2019–20 season, he made six senior appearances for União de Leiria in the Campeonato de Portugal. In February 2021, he joined the reserve team of Swiss club Sion, playing in the Promotion League. On 17 February 2025 he signed for Zimbru Chișinău.

On 30 January 2026, Cleșcenco signed for Scottish Premiership club Kilmarnock on an eighteen-month contract.

== International career ==
Cleșcenco made his international debut for Moldova on 3 June 2021, coming on as a substitute in the 87th minute for Dan Spătaru in a friendly match against Turkey. The match in Paderborn finished as a 2–0 loss.

== Personal life ==
Cleșcenco was born in Dublin, Ireland, and is the son of former footballer and manager Serghei Cleșcenco.

== Career statistics ==
=== International ===
As of 16 November 2026

Moldova
Year	Apps	Goals
2021	3	0
2022	1	0
2023	0	0
2024	3	0
2025	0	0
2026	6	1
Total	13	1

Scores and results list Moldova's goal tally first, score column indicates score after each Cleșcenco goal.

List of international goals scored by Nicky Cleșcenco
No.	Date	Venue	Cap	Opponent	Score	Result	Competition
1	2 October 2026	Astana Arena, Astana, Kazakhstan	11	Kazakhstan	1–0	2–1	2026–27 UEFA Nations League C
