= Michael Schjønning-Larsen =

Estonian footballer (born 2001)

Personal information
- Date of birth: 2 February 2001 (age 25)
- Place of birth: Stenløse, Denmark
- Height: 1.70 m (5 ft 7 in)
- Position: Left-back

Team information
- Current team: Kilmarnock
- Number: 21

Youth career
- FC Nordsjælland
- –2016: AB
- 2017–2018: HIK

Senior career*
Years	Team	Apps	(Gls)
2018–2020	Flora U21	39	(4)
2020–2022	→ Kuressaare (loan)	66	(3)
2023–2025	FCI Levadia Tallinn	94	(4)
2026–	Kilmarnock	38	(4)

International career^{‡}
2016	Estonia U16	2	(0)
2017	Estonia U17	14	(0)
2018	Estonia U18	2	(0)
2019	Estonia U19	3	(0)
2021–2022	Estonia U21	8	(0)
2024–	Estonia	26	(0)
Medal record
Representing Estonia
Men's football
FIFA Series
Runner-up	2026 Rwanda
- * Club domestic league appearances and goals as of 20 May 2026 ‡ National team caps and goals as of 16 November 2026

Michael Schjønning-Larsen (born 2 February 2001) is a footballer who plays as a left-back for Kilmarnock. Born in Denmark, he represents the Estonia national team.

== Career ==
On 16 December 2025, Schjǿnning-Larsen agreed to join Scottish Premiership club Kilmarnock on an eighteen-month contract, joining from 1 January 2026.

== International career ==
Schjønning-Larsen made his debut for the Estonia national team on 8 June 2024 in a 4–1 Baltic Cup victory against the Faroe Islands at the Lilleküla Stadium. He started the game and played 78 minutes.

== Honours ==
Estonia

- FIFA Series runner-up: 2026

== See also ==
- List of Estonia international footballers born outside Estonia
