= Ben Brannan =

Scottish footballer (born 2007)

Personal information
- Full name: Ben Brannan
- Date of birth: 30 January 2007 (age 19)
- Place of birth: Kilmarnock Scotland
- Positions: Defender; midfielder

Team information
- Current team: Kilmarnock
- Number: 26

Youth career
- –2024: Kilmarnock

Senior career*
Years	Team	Apps	(Gls)
2024–	Kilmarnock	17	(1)
2025	→ Inverness Caledonian Thistle (loan)	11	(1)
2026	→ Inverness Caledonian Thistle (loan)	8	(0)
2026-	→ Queen's Park (loan)	6	(0)

International career^{‡}
2023	Scotland U16	3	(0)
2023	Scotland U17	1	(0)
- * Club domestic league appearances and goals as of 10:04, 3 May 2026 (UTC) ‡ National team caps and goals as of 14:06, 16 May 2025 (UTC)

Ben Brannan (born 30 January 2007) is a Scottish footballer who currently plays as a defender for Scottish Premiership side Kilmarnock.

== Career ==
Brannan started his career in the Kilmarnock youth academy, working his way up until signing professionally in 2023.

In February 2025, Brannan was sent out on loan to Inverness Caledonian Thistle in Scottish League One, making his debut in a 1–1 draw with Montrose before scoring his first professional goal two weeks later in a 4–1 win over Stenhousemuir.

In May 2025, after finishing the season with Inverness, Brannan was recalled by Kilmarnock as he went on to captain Killie in a 2–0 win over Dundee to lift the Scottish Youth Cup.

== International career ==
In February 2023, Brannan received his first international youth call up, making his debut on 21 February in a 3–1 loss to Denmark. He was then promoted to the Under 17s team, where he was substituted on in a UEFA U17 European Championship qualifying match against Kazakhstan, with Scotland winning 2–0.
