= 2025–26 St Mirren F.C. season =

St Mirren
2025–26 season
- Chairman: John Needham
- Manager: Stephen Robinson (until 12 March); Craig McLeish (interim)
- Stadium: St Mirren Park
- Premiership: Eleventh place
- Premiership play-offs: Winners
- Scottish Cup: Semi-finals
- League Cup: Winners
- Top goalscorer: League: Miguel Freckleton; Mikael Mandron (4); All: Mikael Mandron (13)
- Highest home attendance: 7,653 vs. Aberdeen, Premiership, 4 April 2026
- Lowest home attendance: 2,164 vs. Annan Athletic, League Cup, 19 July 2026
- Average home league attendance: 6,835

The 2025–26 season was St Mirren's eighth consecutive season in the top tier of Scottish football. The club also participated in the Scottish Cup and won the League Cup.

== Results and fixtures ==
Win Draw Loss Postponed

=== Pre-season and friendlies ===
28 June 2025 Friendly	Dumbarton	0–4	St Mirren	Dumbarton
15:00 BST			Mandron 37'; Idowu 51', 58'; Scott 86'	Stadium: Dumbarton Football Stadium

2 July 2025 Friendly	Heart of Midlothian	1–1	St Mirren	San Pedro del Pinatar
	Baningime 37'	Hearts Report	Mooney 13'	Stadium: Pinatar Arena

5 July 2025 Friendly	MK Dons	1–2	St Mirren	San Pedro del Pinatar
11:00 BST	Ayunga 17' (o.g.)	Report	Idowu 2'; McMenamin 39'	Stadium: Pinatar Arena

8 July 2025 Friendly	Airdrieonians	0–2	St Mirren	Airdrie
19:30 BST		Airdrie report	Mandron 15', 58'	Stadium: Excelsior Stadium; Referee: Matthew MacDermid

=== Scottish Premiership ===
3 August 2025 1	Celtic	1–0	St Mirren	Celtic Park
16:30 BST	McCowan 87'	Report		Attendance: 58,814; Referee: Don Robertson

9 August 2025 2	St Mirren	0–0	Motherwell	St Mirren Park
15:00 BST		Report		Attendance: 6,735; Referee: Ross Hardie

24 August 2025 3	St Mirren	1–1	Rangers	St Mirren Park
12:00 BST	Ayunga 32'	Report	Curtis 78'	Attendance: 6,886; Referee: Nick Walsh

30 August 2025 4	Hibernian	1–1	St Mirren	Easter Road
15:00 BST	Bushiri 70'	Report	Freckleton 61'	Attendance: 17,658; Referee: Matthew MacDermid

13 September 2025 5	Falkirk	1–2	St Mirren	Falkirk Stadium
15:00 BST	Graham 88'	Report	John 64'; Mandron 81'	Attendance: 7,460; Referee: Duncan Nicolson

27 September 2025 6	St Mirren	1–0	Dundee	St Mirren Park
15:00 BST	Phillips 39'	Report		Attendance: 6,382; Referee: Matthew MacDermid

4 October 2025 7	Kilmarnock	2–0	St Mirren	Rugby Park
15:00 BST	Watson 28'; Dackers 36'	Report		Attendance: 5,399; Referee: Nick Walsh

18 October 2025 8	St Mirren	0–1	Aberdeen	St Mirren Park
15:00 BST	Richardson (red card) 81'	Report	Lazetić 90+6'	Attendance: 7,333; Referee: Lloyd Wilson

25 October 2025 9	Dundee United	3–1	St Mirren	Tannadice Park
15:00 BST	Sapsford 42'; Fatah 84' (pen.); Sibbald 90'	Report	Nlundulu 18'; Gogić (red card) 83'	Attendance: 8,843; Referee: John Beaton

29 October 2025 10	St Mirren	2–2	Heart of Midlothian	St Mirren Park
19:45 BST	Nlundulu 28'; Freckleton 55'	Report	Shankland 34'; Braga 70'	Attendance: 7,105; Referee: Matthew MacDermid

8 November 2025 11	St Mirren	0–3	Hibernian	St Mirren Park
17:45 BST		Report	Mulligan 24'; Cadden 53'; Chaiwa 80'	Attendance: 7,116; Referee: David Dickinson

22 November 2025 12	St Mirren	0–1	Celtic	St Mirren Park
20:00 BST		Report	McGregor 90+5'	Attendance: 6,840; Referee: Kevin Clancy

29 November 2025 13	Dundee	3–1	St Mirren	Dens Park
15:00 BST	Gogić 29' (o.g.); Wright 39'; Westley 87'	Report	Mandron 27'	Attendance: 4,782; Referee: John Beaton

3 December 2025 14	Aberdeen	3–3	St Mirren	Pittodrie Stadium
19:45 BST	Polvara 71'; Lazetić 73', 85'	Report	Fraser 55' (pen.); Ayunga 82'; King 90+9'	Attendance: 14,826; Referee: Steven McLean

6 December 2025 15	St Mirren	2–0	Dundee United	St Mirren Park
20:00 BST	McMenamin 17'; Baccus 66'	Report		Attendance: 6,840; Referee: Nick Walsh

20 December 2025 16	St Mirren	1–0	Livingston	St Mirren Park
15:00 BST	Mandron 72'	Report		Attendance: 5,764; Referee: Chris Graham

27 December 2025 17	St Mirren	0–0	Kilmarnock	St Mirren Park
15:00 BST		Report		Attendance: 7,531; Referee: Don Robertson

30 December 2025 18	Rangers	2–1	St Mirren	Ibrox Stadium
19:45 BST	Aasgaard 39'; Fernandez 52'	Report	Mandron 82'	Attendance: 50,526; Referee: Ryan Lee

3 January 2026 19	Motherwell	2–0	St Mirren	Fir Park
19:45 BST	Maswanhise 35'; Watt 57'	Report		Attendance: 7,934; Referee: Calum Scott

10 January 2026 20	St Mirren	0–2	Falkirk	St Mirren Park
15:00 BST		Report	Yeats 55'; Miller 61'	Attendance: 7,062; Referee: Steven McLean

14 January 2026 21	Heart of Midlothian	2–0	St Mirren	Tynecastle Park
19:45 BST	Baningime (red card) 15'; Shankland 60'; Magnusson 80'	Report		Attendance: 18,410; Referee: Kevin Clancy

20 January 2026 22	Livingston	1–1	St Mirren	Almondvale Stadium
19:45 BST	Muirhead 56'	Report	Gogić 89'	Attendance: 1,564; Referee: Duncan Nicolson

31 January 2026 23	St Mirren	0–0	Dundee	St Mirren Park
15:00 BST	Young (red card) 63'	Report		Attendance: 6,461; Referee: Nick Walsh

3 February 2026 24	St Mirren	1–0	Heart of Midlothian	St Mirren Park
19:45 BST	Freckleton 88'	Report	Halkett (red card) 29'	Attendance: 7,151; Referee: Steven McLean

11 February 2026 25	Kilmarnock	4–3	St Mirren	Rugby Park
19:45 BST	Kiltie 43'; John-Jules 45+1', 76', 82'	Report	Phillips 8', 47'; Tanser 90+3'	Attendance: 4,892; Referee: Grant Irvine

14 February 2026 26	Hibernian	2–0	St Mirren	Easter Road
15:00 BST	Elding 42'; Šuto 66'	Report		Attendance: 18,012; Referee: Dan McFarlane

21 February 2026 27	St Mirren	0–5	Motherwell	St Mirren Park
19:30 BST	King (red card) 52'	Report	Just 14'; Maswanhise 30' (pen.); Said 49'; Longelo 58'; Bjørgolfsson 66'	Attendance: 6,758; Referee: Calum Scott

28 February 2026 28	Livingston	1–1	St Mirren	Almondvale Stadium
15:00 BST	Kabongolo 76'	Report	Nlundulu 44'	Attendance: 2,065; Referee: Don Robertson

3 March 2026 29	Dundee United	2–1	St Mirren	Tannadice Park
19:45 BST	Fraser 8' (o.g.); Fatah 83' (pen.)	Report	Young 47'	Attendance: 8,360; Referee: Matthew MacDermid

15 March 2026 30	St Mirren	0–1	Rangers	St Mirren Park
12:00 BST		Report	Rommens 31'	Attendance: 6,898; Referee: Steven McLean

21 March 2026 31	Falkirk	1–2	St Mirren	Falkirk Stadium
15:00 BST	Stewart 15'	Report	Freckleton 18'; Donnelly 63'	Attendance: 7,526; Referee: Ross Hardie

4 April 2026 32	St Mirren	2–0	Aberdeen	St Mirren Park
12:00 BST	Ayunga 40'; Gogić 83'	Report		Attendance: 7,653; Referee: Nick Walsh

11 April 2026 33	Celtic	1–0	St Mirren	Celtic Park
15:00 BST	Oxlade-Chamberlain 15'	Report		Attendance: 58,695; Referee: Duncan Nicolson

25 April 2026 34	St Mirren	0–2	Livingston	St Mirren Park
15:00 BST		Report	Gogić 67' (o.g.); Pittman 81'	Attendance: 5,884; Referee: David Dickinson

2 May 2026 35	Dundee	1–0	St Mirren	Dens Park
15:00 BST	Westley 12'	Report		Attendance: 5,379; Referee: Steven McLean

9 May 2026 36	St Mirren	0–3	Kilmarnock	St Mirren Park
19:45 BST		Report	Freckleton 9' (o.g.); Curtis 46', 68'	Attendance: 7,619; Referee: Don Robertson

12 May 2026 37	Aberdeen	0–2	St Mirren	Pittodrie Stadium
19:45 BST		Report	King 42'; Phillips 80'	Attendance: 16,138; Referee: David Dickinson

17 May 2026 38	St Mirren	1–1	Dundee United	St Mirren Park
14:00 BST	Young 69'	Report	Sapsford 27'	Attendance: 6,177; Referee: Steven McLean

=== Premiership play-offs ===
21 May 2026 Final 1st leg	Partick Thistle	1–1	St Mirren	Firhill Stadium
20:00 BST	Fitzpatrick 62'	Report	Phillips 39'	Attendance: 8,323; Referee: Ryan Lee

25 May 2026 Final 2nd leg	St Mirren	1–0 (2–1 agg.)	Partick Thistle	St Mirren Park
20:00 BST	Fraser 65'	Report		Attendance: 7,472; Referee: Nick Walsh

=== Scottish League Cup ===
==== Group stage ====
12 July 2025 Group stage	Arbroath	0–0 (5–3 p)	St Mirren	Gayfield Park
15:00		Report	O'Hara (red card) 88'	Attendance: 1,636; Referee: Steven McLean

15 July 2025 Group stage	Forfar Athletic	1–2	St Mirren	Station Park
19:45	Inglis 80'	Report	Richardson 9'; Mandron 75'	Attendance: 966; Referee: Dan McFarlane

19 July 2025 Group stage	St Mirren	8–2	Annan Athletic	St Mirren Park
15:00 BST	Phillips 4', 7'; Mandron 9', 82', 87'; King 61' (pen.); Richardson 84'; Idowu 90+2'	Report		Attendance: 2,164; Referee: Ross Hardie

27 July 2025 Group stage	St Mirren	2–1	Ayr United	St Mirren Park
15:00 BST	Phillips 16', 38'	Report	Holt 65'	Attendance: 4,174; Referee: Euan Anderson

==== Knockout phase ====
16 August 2025 Second round	St Mirren	1–1 (a.e.t.) (5–4 p)	Heart of Midlothian	St Mirren Park
15:00	Gogić 34'	Report	McEntee 78'	Attendance: 4,738; Referee: Steven McLean
	Penalties
	King (penalty scored); Fraser (penalty scored); Idowu (penalty scored); Mooney (penalty scored); Dijksteel (penalty scored)		(penalty scored) Shankland; (penalty scored) Kingsley; (penalty missed) Braga; (penalty scored) Forrest; (penalty scored) Baningime

19 September 2025 Quarter-finals	Kilmarnock	2–2 (a.e.t.) (3–5 p)	St Mirren	Rugby Park
19:45	Deas 44'; Anderson 86' (pen.)	Report	Mandron 25'; Richardson 59'	Attendance: 7,192; Referee: David Dickinson

1 November 2025 Semi-finals	Motherwell	1–4	St Mirren	Hampden Park
17:30	Hendry 83'	Report	Mandron 25', 89'; Nlundulu 40'; King 86'	Attendance: 21,277; Referee: Don Robertson

14 December 2025 Final	St Mirren	3–1	Celtic	Glasgow
15:30 GMT	Fraser 2'; Ayunga 64', 76'	Report	Hatate 23'	Stadium: Hampden Park; Attendance: 49,914; Referee: Kevin Clancy

=== Scottish Cup ===
17 January 2026 Fourth round	Livingston	1–1 (a.e.t.) (3–4 p)	St Mirren	Livingston
15:00 GMT	Arfield 11'	Report	Idowu 4'	Stadium: Almondvale Stadium; Attendance: 1,834; Referee: Matthew MacDermid

6 February 2026 Fifth round	Airdrieonians	1–2 (a.e.t.)	St Mirren	Airdrie
19:45 GMT	Henderson 66'	Report	Devaney 19'; Idowu 115'	Stadium: Excelsior Stadium; Attendance: 2,900; Referee: Kevin Clancy

8 March 2026 Quarter-finals	St Mirren	2–1	Partick Thistle	Paisley
19:30	Nlundulu 33' (pen.); Young 45+2'	Report	Stanway 61'	Stadium: St Mirren Park; Attendance: 5,548; Referee: David Dickinson

19 April 2026 Semi-finals	Celtic	6–2 (a.e.t.)	St Mirren	Glasgow
14:00	Maeda 1'; Ralston 45+3'; Iheanacho 96', 100'; McCowan 98'; Nygren 102'	Report	Mandron 53', 90+1'	Stadium: Hampden Park; Attendance: 47,149; Referee: Matthew MacDermid

== Player statistics ==
=== Appearances and goals ===
As of 25 May 2026

No.	Pos	Player	Premiership + playoffs		League Cup		Scottish Cup		Total	
No.	Pos	Player	Apps	Goals	Apps	Goals	Apps	Goals	Apps	Goals
1	GK	(England) Shamal George	33+0	0	5+0	0	3+0	0	41	0
2	DF	(England) Jayden Richardson	23+12	0	6+2	3	3+1	0	47	3
3	DF	(England) Scott Tanser	10+14	1	2+4	0	0+3	0	33	1
4	MF	(Northern Ireland) Liam Donnelly	10+7	1	0+2	0	1+2	0	22	1
5	DF	(Jamaica) Richard King	22+11	2	4+3	2	2+1	0	43	4
6	MF	(Scotland) Mark O'Hara	21+3	0	5+0	0	2+0	0	31	0
7	MF	(Republic of Ireland) Roland Idowu	16+11	0	3+3	1	1+3	2	37	3
8	MF	(Republic of Ireland) Jacob Devaney	14+1	0	0+0	0	2+1	1	18	1
9	FW	(France) Mikael Mandron	30+6	4	6+2	7	3+0	2	47	13
10	FW	(Northern Ireland) Conor McMenamin	14+11	1	3+3	0	0+2	0	33	1
11	FW	(Kenya) Jonah Ayunga	14+9	3	5+3	2	1+0	0	32	5
13	MF	(Cyprus) Alex Gogić	35+0	2	8+0	1	4+0	0	47	3
14	FW	(England) Dan Nlundulu	16+12	3	2+1	1	1+1	1	33	5
16	MF	(Scotland) Allan Campbell	10+4	0	0+0	0	1+0	0	15	0
17	FW	(Jamaica) Jalmaro Calvin	0+6	0	0+0	0	0+2	0	8	0
18	MF	(Netherlands) Malik Dijksteel	0+7	0	0+2	0	0+2	0	11	0
20	FW	(England) Jake Young	6+8	2	0+0	0	2+1	1	17	3
21	DF	(England) Miguel Freckleton	39+0	4	4+0	0	4+0	0	47	4
22	DF	(Scotland) Marcus Fraser	31+2	2	6+0	1	3+0	0	42	3
24	DF	(Wales) Declan John	27+2	1	7+1	0	4+0	0	41	1
25	MF	(Australia) Keanu Baccus	14+2	1	4+0	0	1+0	0	21	1
27	GK	(Scotland) Ross Sinclair	7+0	0	0+0	0	0+0	0	7	0
29	FW	(England) Kion Etete	1+2	0	0+0	0	0+1	0	4	0
31	GK	(Scotland) Ryan Mullen	1+2	0	1+0	0	0+0	0	4	0
32	FW	(Scotland) Luke Douglas	1+3	0	0+0	0	0+0	0	4	0
35	GK	(Scotland) Grant Tamosevicius	0+1	0	0+0	0	0+0	0	1	0
36	DF	(Scotland) Billy Hutchison	0+0	0	0+0	0	0+0	0	0	0
38	DF	(Scotland) Thomas Falconer	0+1	0	0+0	0	0+0	0	1	0
40	FW	(Scotland) Caiden McMillan	0+1	0	0+0	0	0+0	0	1	0
88	MF	(Republic of Ireland) Killian Phillips	38+0	5	8+0	4	4+0	0	50	9
Players who left the club during the 2025–26 season
4	DF	(Scotland) Alex Iacovitti	0+0	0	1+3	0	0+0	0	4	0
8	MF	(Northern Ireland) Oisin Smyth	1+1	0	1+2	0	1+0	0	6	0
14	FW	(Scotland) James Scott	0+0	0	1+2	0	0+0	0	3	0
19	DF	(Republic of Ireland) Tunmise Sobowale	1+4	0	0+1	0	0+1	0	7	0
26	DF	(Scotland) Luke Kenny	0+0	0	0+0	0	0+0	0	0	0
27	GK	(Slovakia) Peter Urminský	0+0	0	2+0	0	0+0	0	2	0
28	DF	(Scotland) Callum Penman	0+0	0	0+0	0	0+0	0	0	0
30	MF	(Scotland) Fraser Taylor	4+4	0	2+2	0	0+0	0	12	0
33	FW	(Scotland) Evan Mooney	0+10	0	0+3	0	0+1	0	14	0

=== Goal scorers ===
As of match played 25 May 2026

Number	Position	Nation	Name	Total	Scottish Premiership + playoffs	League Cup	Scottish Cup
2	DF	(England)	Jayden Richardson	3		3	
3	DF	(England)	Scott Tanser	1	1		
4	MF	(Northern Ireland)	Liam Donnelly	1	1		
5	DF	(Jamaica)	Richard King	4	2	2	
7	MF	(Republic of Ireland)	Roland Idowu	3		1	2
8	MF	(Republic of Ireland)	Jacob Devaney	1			1
9	FW	(France)	Mikael Mandron	13	4	7	2
10	FW	(Northern Ireland)	Conor McMenamin	1	1		
11	FW	(Kenya)	Jonah Ayunga	5	3	2	
13	MF	(Cyprus)	Alex Gogić	3	2	1	
14	FW	(England)	Dan Nlundulu	5	3	1	1
20	FW	(England)	Jake Young	3	2		1
21	DF	(England)	Miguel Freckleton	4	4		
22	DF	(Scotland)	Marcus Fraser	3	2	1	
24	DF	(Wales)	Declan John	1	1		
25	MF	(Australia)	Keanu Baccus	1	1		
88	MF	(Republic of Ireland)	Killian Phillips	9	5	4	
Total				61	32	22	7

=== Disciplinary record ===
Includes all competitive matches.

Last updated 25 May 2026

Number	Nation	Position	Name	Total		Scottish Premiership + playoffs		League Cup		Scottish Cup	
Number	Nation	Position	Name	Yellow card	Red card	Yellow card	Red card	Yellow card	Red card	Yellow card	Red card
1	(England)	GK	Shamal George	3	0	3					
2	(England)	DF	Jayden Richardson	2	1	1	1	1			
3	(England)	DF	Scott Tanser	1	0	1					
4	(Northern Ireland)	MF	Liam Donnelly	3	0	3					
5	(Jamaica)	DF	Richard King	8	1	7	1	1		1	
6	(Scotland)	MF	Mark O'Hara	4	1	1		2	1	1	
7	(Republic of Ireland)	MF	Roland Idowu	4	0	4					
8	(Republic of Ireland)	MF	Jacob Devaney	3	0	3					
9	(France)	FW	Mikael Mandron	4	0	3		1			
10	(Northern Ireland)	FW	Conor McMenamin	1	0	1					
11	(Kenya)	FW	Jonah Ayunga	2	0	1		1			
13	(Cyprus)	DF	Alex Gogić	15	1	13	1			2	
14	(England)	FW	Dan Nlundulu	3	0	2		1			
16	(Scotland)	MF	Allan Campbell	2	0	1				1	
20	(England)	FW	Jake Young	0	1		1				
21	(England)	DF	Miguel Freckleton	7	0	7					
22	(Scotland)	DF	Marcus Fraser	8	0	6		2		1	
24	(Wales)	DF	Declan John	2	0	1		1			
25	(Australia)	MF	Keanu Baccus	6	0	5		1			
30	(Scotland)	MF	Fraser Taylor	2	0	2					
88	(Republic of Ireland)	MF	Killian Phillips	11	0	10		1			

== Team statistics ==
=== League table ===
Pos	Team	Pld	W	D	L	GF	GA	GD	Pts	Qualification or relegation (Note: Teams played each other three times (33 matches), before the league was split into two groups (the top six and the bottom six).)
8	Dundee	38	11	9	18	42	61	−19	42	
9	Aberdeen	38	11	7	20	40	55	−15	40	
10	Kilmarnock	38	10	10	18	50	68	−18	40	
11	St Mirren (O)	38	8	10	20	30	55	−25	34	Qualification for the Premiership play-off final
12	Livingston (R)	38	2	15	21	40	75	−35	21	Relegation to Championship

Rules for classification: 1) Points; 2) Goal difference; 3) Goals scored; 4) Head-to-head points; 5) Head-to-head goal difference; 6) Play-off (only if deciding champion, UEFA competition qualification, second stage group allocation, or relegation).
(O) Play-off winners; (R) Relegated

=== Division summary ===
Round	1	2	3	4	5	6	7	8	9	10	11	12	13	14	15	16	17	18	19	20	21	22	23	24	25	26	27	28	29	30	31	32	33	34	35	36	37	38
Ground	A	H	H	A	A	H	A	H	A	H	H	H	A	A	H	H	H	A	A	H	A	A	H	H	A	A	H	A	A	H	A	H	A	H	A	H	A	H
Result	L	D	D	D	W	W	L	L	L	D	L	L	L	D	W	W	D	L	L	L	L	D	D	W	L	L	L	D	L	L	W	W	L	L	L	L	W	D
Position	12	9	9	10	4	3	5	7	9	9	9	9	11	11	9	9	9	10	10	10	10	10	10	9	9	10	10	10	10	10	10	10	10	10	11	11	11	11

Updated to match(es) played on 17 May 2026. Source:
A = Away; H = Home; W = Win; D = Draw; L = Loss

=== League Cup table ===
Pos	Team	Pld	W	PW	PL	L	GF	GA	GD	Pts	Qualification	STM	AYR	ARB	FOR	ANN
1	St Mirren	4	3	0	1	0	12	4	+8	10	Qualification for the second round	—	2–1	—	—	8–2
2	Ayr United	4	3	0	0	1	14	3	+11	9	Qualification for the second round	—	—	4–0	3–0	—
3	Arbroath	4	1	1	0	2	6	5	+1	5		p0–0	—	—	—	6–0
4	Forfar Athletic	4	1	1	0	2	3	6	−3	5		1–2	—	1–0	—	—
5	Annan Athletic	4	0	0	1	3	4	21	−17	1		—	1–6	—	1–1p	—

Rules for classification: 1) goal difference, 2) goals scored, 3) away goals scored, 4) matches won, 5) away matches won, 6) drawing of lots.

== Transfers ==
=== Players in ===
Position	Nationality	Name	From	Transfer Window	Fee	Source
MF	(Republic of Ireland)	Killian Phillips	Crystal Palace	Summer	Undisclosed	
MF	(Republic of Ireland)	Roland Idowu	Shrewsbury Town	Summer	Undisclosed	
DF	(Jamaica)	Richard King	Cavalier	Summer	Undisclosed	
DF	(England)	Jayden Richardson	Boreham Wood	Summer	Free	
MF	(Northern Ireland)	Liam Donnelly	Kilmarnock	Summer	Free	
GK	(Scotland)	Ryan Mullen	Greenock Morton	Summer	Free	
DF	(Republic of Ireland)	Tunmise Sobowale	Swindon Town	Summer	Free	
FW	(Jamaica)	Jalmaro Calvin	Cavalier	Summer	Undisclosed	
DF	(England)	Miguel Freckleton	Sheffield United	Summer	Undisclosed	
GK	(England)	Shamal George	Wycombe Wanderers	Summer	Loan	
MF	(Netherlands)	Malik Dijksteel	Cork City	Summer	Undisclosed	
MF	(Australia)	Keanu Baccus	Mansfield Town	Summer	Undisclosed	
FW	(England)	Dan Nlundulu	Bolton Wanderers	Summer	Undisclosed	
MF	(Scotland)	Allan Campbell	Free agent	Winter	Free	
FW	(England)	Jake Young	Stevenage	Winter	Undisclosed	
FW	(England)	Kion Etete	Cardiff City	Winter	Loan	
MF	(Republic of Ireland)	Jacob Devaney	Manchester United	Winter	Loan	
GK	(Scotland)	Ross Sinclair	St Johnstone	Winter	Emergency loan	

=== Players out ===
Position	Nationality	Name	To	Transfer Window	Fee	Source
MF	(England)	Dennis Adeniran	Barnet	Summer	Free	
MF	(Northern Ireland)	Caolan Boyd-Munce	Wycombe Wanderers	Summer	Free	
DF	(Uganda)	Elvis Bwomono	ÍBV	Summer	Free	
MF	(Scotland)	Owen Foster	Alloa Athletic	Summer	Free	
DF	(Northern Ireland)	Gallagher Lennon	Broxburn Athletic	Summer	Free	
DF	(England)	Richard Taylor	Bolton Wanderers	Summer	Free	
MF	(Scotland)	Greg Kiltie	Kilmarnock	Summer	Undisclosed	
FW	(Republic of Ireland)	Owen Oseni	Plymouth Argyle	Summer	Undisclosed	
GK	(Scotland)	Shay Kelly	Dumbarton	Summer	Free	
DF	(Scotland)	Thomas Falconer	Dumbarton	Summer	Co-operation loan	
MF	(Scotland)	Carrick McAvoy	Dumbarton	Summer	Co-operation loan	
FW	(Scotland)	Theo McCormick	Dumbarton	Summer	Co-operation loan	
DF	(Scotland)	Luke Kenny	Arbroath	Summer	Loan	
DF	(Scotland)	Callum Penman	Queen of the South	Summer	Loan	
GK	(Slovakia)	Peter Urminský	Glentoran	Summer	Loan	
DF	(Scotland)	Alex Iacovitti	Ross County	Summer	Free	
FW	(Scotland)	James Scott	Ross County	Summer	Loan	
MF	(Northern Ireland)	Oisin Smyth	Partick Thistle	Summer	Loan	
MF	(Scotland)	Fraser Taylor	Partick Thistle	Winter	Loan	
FW	(Scotland)	Evan Mooney	Arsenal	Winter	Undisclosed	
DF	(Republic of Ireland)	Tunmise Sobowale	Shamrock Rovers	Winter	Loan	
