= 2024–25 St Mirren F.C. season =

St Mirren
2024–25 season
- Chairman: John Needham
- Manager: Stephen Robinson
- Stadium: St Mirren Park
- Premiership: 6th
- Scottish Cup: Fifth round
- League Cup: Second round
- Conference League: Third qualifying round
- Top goalscorer: League: Toyosi Olusanya (8); All: Toyosi Olusanya (12)
- Highest home attendance: 7,671 vs. Hibernian, Premiership, 14 May 2025
- Lowest home attendance: 4,611 vs. Heart of Midlothian, Scottish Cup, 10 February 2025
- Average home league attendance: 6,939
Home colours	Away colours

The 2024–25 season was St Mirren's 7th consecutive season in the top tier of Scottish football since being promoted from the Scottish Championship at the end of the 2017–18 season. The club also participated in the Scottish Cup, League Cup, and in European football for the first time since 1987 after qualifying for the UEFA Conference League.

== Results and fixtures ==
Win Draw Loss Postponed

=== Pre-season and friendlies ===
6 July 2024 Friendly	Dunfermline Athletic	0–1	St Mirren	Dunfermline
15:00 BST		Report	Olusanya 28'	Stadium: East End Park; Attendance: 1,148; Referee: Jordan Curran

9 July 2024 Renfrewshire Cup	Greenock Morton	0–2	St Mirren	Greenock
19:45 BST		Report	Idowu 3', 33'	Stadium: Cappielow; Attendance: 2,262; Referee: Colin Steven

13 July 2024 Friendly	St Mirren	2–2	Fleetwood Town	St Mirren Park
15:00 BST	Smyth 63'; Jamieson 87'	Report	Coughlan 9'; Quitirna 68'	Stadium: Paisley; Attendance: 1,699; Referee: David Dickinson

19 July 2024 Friendly	St Mirren	2–2	Carlisle United	St Mirren Park
15:00 BST	Olusanya 50'; Scott 80'	Report	Neal 30'; Thomas 85'	Stadium: Paisley; Attendance: 2,011

=== Scottish Premiership ===
4 August 2024 1	St Mirren	3–0	Hibernian	St Mirren Park
15:00 BST	Idowu 48'; Smyth 78', 80'	Report		Attendance: 6,171; Referee: Matthew McDermid

11 August 2024 2	Aberdeen	3–1	St Mirren	Pittodrie Stadium
15:00 BST	Guèye 39'; McGrath 54'; Besuijen 81'	Report	Olusanya 45+3'	Attendance: 17,057; Referee: Grant Irvine

24 August 2024 3	St Mirren	0–3	Celtic	St Mirren Park
15:00 BST		Report	McGregor 3'; Hatate 33'; Johnston 71'	Attendance: 6,940; Referee: Chris Graham

31 August 2024 4	Dundee	2–2	St Mirren	Dens Park
15:00 BST	Main 30'; Larkeche 54'	Report	Olusanya 26'; Mandron 36'	Attendance: 5,779; Referee: Lloyd Wilson

14 September 2024 5	St Mirren	2–2	Kilmarnock	St Mirren Park
15:00 BST	Olusanya 7'; O'Hara 41' (pen.)	Report	Watkins 11'; Wright (red card) 45+5'; Ayunga 71' (o.g.)	Attendance: 6,957; Referee: Matthew MacDermid

21 September 2024 6	St Mirren	2–1	Heart of Midlothian	St Mirren Park
15:00 BST	Taylor 8 o.g.' Olusanya 34'	Report	Halkett 18'	Attendance: 7,341; Referee: Don Robertson

28 September 2024 7	Motherwell	2–1	St Mirren	Fir Park
15:00 BST	Miller 19 pen.', 44'; Casey (red card) 47'	Report	Phillips 9'; Tanser (red card) 61'	Attendance: 5,214; Referee: Lloyd Wilson

5 October 2024 8	St Mirren	0–1	Dundee United	St Mirren Park
15:00 BST		Report	Adegboyega 75'	Attendance: 7,166; Referee: Ross Hardie

18 October 2024 9	Heart of Midlothian	4–0	St Mirren	Tynecastle Park
15:00 BST	Vargas 15'; Oyegoke 47'; Wilson 86'; Spittal 90+3'	Report		Attendance: 18,757; Referee: Colin Steven

27 October 2024 10	Rangers	2–1	St Mirren	Ibrox Stadium
15:00 BST	Diomande 13'; Černý 69'	Report	Gogić 26'	Attendance: 48,859; Referee: Calum Scott

30 October 2024 11	St Mirren	3–1	St Johnstone	St Mirren Park
19:45 BST	Tanser 30'; O'Hara 57'; Ayunga 90+3'	Report	Kimpioka 8'	Attendance: 6,042; Referee: Steven McLean

2 November 2024 12	St Mirren	0–0	Ross County	St Mirren Park
15:00 BST		Report		Attendance: 6,142; Referee: Don Robertson

9 November 2024 13	Hibernian	1–2	St Mirren	Easter Road
15:00 BST	N.Cadden 90+4 pen.'	Report	McMenamin 16', 31'	Attendance: 15,594; Referee: Iain Snedden

23 November 2024 14	St Mirren	2–1	Aberdeen	St Mirren Park
15:15 BST	Olusanya 19'; Taylor 83'	Report	McGrath 50'	Attendance: 7,533; Referee: John Beaton

30 November 2024 15	Dundee United	2–0	St Mirren	Tannadice Park
15:00 BST	Holt 79 pen.' Adegboyega 90+3'	Report	Fraser (red card) 90+1'	Attendance: 8,868; Referee: Matthew MacDermid

7 December 2024 16	St Mirren	0–1	Motherwell	St Mirren Park
15:15 BST	Gogić (red card) 90+3'	Report	Watt 90+4'	Attendance: 6,111; Referee: Dan McFarlane

14 December 2024 17	St Johnstone	2–3	St Mirren	McDiarmid Park
15:00 BST	Kirk 52'; Kimpioka 81'	Report	Phillips 10'; Mooney 88'; Idowu 90+9 pen.'	Attendance: 4,001; Referee: Euan Anderson

21 December 2024 18	Ross County	1–2	St Mirren	Victoria Park
15:00 BST	Efete 46'	Report	Iacovitti 27'; Tanser (red card) 55'; Smyth 89'	Attendance: 3,271; Referee: Iain Snedden

26 December 2024 19	St Mirren	2–1	Rangers	St Mirren Park
17:45 BST	Smyth 30 pen.' Boyd-Munce 90+3'	Report	Danilo 61'	Attendance: 7,175; Referee: David Dickinson

29 December 2024 20	St Mirren	1–2	Dundee	St Mirren Park
15:00 BST	Olusanya 40'	Report	Murray 29', 66'	Attendance: 6,798; Referee: Nick Walsh

2 January 2025 21	Kilmarnock	2–0	St Mirren	Rugby Park
15:00 BST	Anderson 8', 65 pen.'	Report		Attendance: 6,603; Referee: Colin Steven

5 January 2025 22	Celtic	3–0	St Mirren	Celtic Park
15:00 BST	Kühn 33', 68'; Trusty 43'	Report		Referee: Grant Irvine

11 January 2025 23	St Mirren	0–1	Dundee United	St Mirren Park
15:00 BST		Report	Moult 88'	Attendance: 7,440; Referee: David Dickinson

25 January 2025 24	Aberdeen	0–3	St Mirren	Pittodrie Stadium
15:00 BST		Report	Olusanya 7'; Mandron 36', 78'	Attendance: 15,829; Referee: Chris Graham

1 February 2025 25	St Mirren	0–1	St Johnstone	St Mirren Park
15:00 BST		Report	Mikulić 71'	Attendance: 6,298; Referee: Dan McFarlane

16 February 2025 26	St Mirren	0–0	Hibernian	St Mirren Park
15:00 BST		Report	Manneh (red card) 84'	Attendance: 7,468; Referee: Ross Hardie

22 February 2025 27	Rangers	0–2	St Mirren	Ibrox Stadium
15:00 BST		Report	Mandron 51'; Olusanya 70'	Attendance: 49,994; Referee: Kevin Clancy

26 February 2025 28	Heart of Midlothian	3–1	St Mirren	Tynecastle Park
19:45 BST	Wilson 56'; Nieuwenhof 63'; Vargas 90+5'	Report	Mandron 37'	Attendance: 18,770; Referee: Euan Anderson

1 March 2025 29	St Mirren	2–5	Celtic	St Mirren Park
17:30 BST	John 33'; Phillips 48'	Report	Schlupp 28'; Engels 45+1' (pen.); Yang 68', 90+3'; Maeda 88'	Attendance: 7,127; Referee: Matthew MacDermid

15 March 2025 30	Motherwell	2–2	St Mirren	Fir Park
15:00 BST	Slattery 35', 71'	Report	Boyd-Munce 23'; Phillips 33'; Olusanya (red card) 84'	Attendance: 6,121; Referee: Grant Irvine

29 March 2025 31	St Mirren	5–1	Kilmarnock	St Mirren Park
15:00 BST	Boyd-Munce 6', 58'; Idowu 9 pen.' O'Hara 65'; John 69'	Report	Anderson 88 pen.'	Attendance: 7,542; Referee: Nick Walsh

5 April 2025 32	Dundee	2–0	St Mirren	Dens Park
15:00 BST	Murray 2', 63'	Report		Attendance: 6,580; Referee: John Beaton

12 April 2025 33	St Mirren	3–2	Ross County	St Mirren Park
15:00 BST	Boyd-Munce 36'; Ayunga 50'; Idowu 86'	Report	Hale 22'; White 63'	Attendance: 6,318; Referee: Calum Scott

26 April 2025 34	St Mirren	2–2	Rangers	St Mirren Park
15:00 BST	O'Hara 44'; McMenamin 73'	Report	Dessers 42'; Raskin 52'	Attendance: 7,019; Referee: Colin Steven

3 May 2025 35	St Mirren	1–0	Aberdeen	St Mirren Park
15:00 BST	Mandron 60'	Report		Attendance: 7,587; Referee: Ross Hardie

10 May 2025 36	Dundee United	0–2	St Mirren	Tannadice Park
15:00 BST		Report	Mandron 31'; Ayunga 66'	Attendance: 9,821; Referee: Steven McLean

14 May 2025 37	St Mirren	2–2	Hibernian	St Mirren Park
19:45 BST	Taylor 45+5'; McMenamin 64'	Report	Boyle 3'; Kukharevych 10'	Attendance: 7,671; Referee: Chris Graham

17 May 2025 38	Celtic	1–1	St Mirren	Celtic Park
12:30 BST	Forrest 90+4'	Report	Ayunga 51'	Referee: David Dickinson

=== Scottish Cup ===
18 January 2025 Fourth round	Queen of the South	1–3	St Mirren	Palmerston Park
15:00	Dickenson 75'	Report	Olusanya 10', 21'; Boyd-Munce 90+4'	Attendance: 2,567; Referee: Ryan Lee

10 February 2025 Fifth round	St Mirren	1–1 (a.e.t.) (2–4 p)	Heart of Midlothian	St Mirren Park
19:45	Mandron 23'	Report	Nieuwenhof 84'	Attendance: 4,611; Referee: Don Robertson

=== Scottish League Cup ===
==== Knockout phase ====
18 August 2024 Second round	Dundee United	1–0	St Mirren	Tannadice Park
14:00	Graham 34'	Report		Attendance: 4,285; Referee: John Beaton

=== UEFA Conference League ===
==== Second qualifying round ====
25 July 2024 First leg	(Iceland) Valur	0–0	St Mirren	Hlíðarendi
20:45	Jóhannsson (red card) 81'	Report		Attendance: 1,200; Referee: Damian Kos

1 August 2024 Second leg	St Mirren	4–1 (4–1 agg.)	(Iceland) Valur	St Mirren Park
19:45	Rooney 16'; Olusanya 52'; O'Hara 65'; Iacovitti 87'	Report	Haraldsson 75 pen.'	Attendance: 6,715; Referee: Mikkel Redder

==== Third qualifying round ====
8 August 2024 First leg	St Mirren	1–1	(Norway) SK Brann	St Mirren Park
19:45	Olusanya 90'	Report	Myhre 75'	Attendance: 7,023; Referee: Matthew De Gabriele

15 August 2024 Second leg	(Norway) SK Brann	3–1 (4–2 agg.)	St Mirren	Brann Stadion
19:00	Soltvedt 5'; Myhre 85'; Heggebø 88'	Report	Iacovitti 74'	Attendance: 14,500; Referee: Radoslav Gidzhenov

== Player statistics ==
=== Appearances and goals ===
As of 17 May 2025

No.	Pos	Player	Premiership		League Cup		Scottish Cup		Conference League		Total	
No.	Pos	Player	Apps	Goals	Apps	Goals	Apps	Goals	Apps	Goals	Apps	Goals
1	GK	(England) Zach Hemming	16+0	0	0+0	0	2+0	0	0+0	0	18	0
2	DF	(England) Ryan Alebiosu	13+0	0	0+0	0	1+0	0	0+0	0	14	0
3	DF	(England) Scott Tanser	19+10	2	1+0	0	1+0	0	0+1	0	32	2
4	DF	(Scotland) Alex Iacovitti	8+6	1	1+0	0	1+0	0	0+3	2	19	3
5	DF	(England) Richard Taylor	31+2	2	0+1	0	1+1	0	4+0	0	40	2
6	MF	(Scotland) Mark O'Hara	30+2	4	0+0	0	2+0	0	2+0	1	36	5
7	FW	(Kenya) Jonah Ayunga	14+13	4	0+1	0	0+0	0	2+1	0	31	4
8	MF	(Northern Ireland) Oisin Smyth	6+13	4	1+0	0	1+1	0	2+2	0	26	4
9	FW	(France) Mikael Mandron	18+15	7	1+0	0	2+0	1	2+1	0	39	8
10	FW	(Northern Ireland) Conor McMenamin	5+6	4	0+0	0	0+0	0	0+0	0	11	4
11	MF	(Scotland) Greg Kiltie	14+15	0	0+0	0	0+1	0	0+0	0	30	0
12	MF	(Republic of Ireland) Roland Idowu	13+17	4	1+0	0	0+0	0	3+1	0	35	4
13	MF	(Cyprus) Alex Gogić	35+1	1	1+0	0	2+0	0	4+0	0	43	1
14	FW	(Scotland) James Scott	4+9	0	0+1	0	0+1	0	0+4	0	19	0
15	MF	(Northern Ireland) Caolan Boyd-Munce	22+8	5	0+0	0	1+1	1	3+0	0	35	6
19	FW	(Republic of Ireland) Owen Oseni	0+10	0	0+0	0	0+1	0	0+0	0	11	0
22	DF	(Scotland) Marcus Fraser	38+0	0	1+0	0	2+0	0	4+0	0	45	0
23	MF	(England) Dennis Adeniran	2+4	0	0+0	0	0+0	0	2+2	0	10	0
24	DF	(Wales) Declan John	15+2	2	0+0	0	1+1	0	0+0	0	19	2
26	DF	(Scotland) Luke Kenny	0+2	0	0+0	0	0+1	0	0+0	0	3	0
27	GK	(Slovakia) Peter Urminský	0+0	0	0+0	0	0+0	0	0+0	0	0	0
31	GK	(Scotland) Shay Kelly	0+0	0	0+0	0	0+0	0	0+0	0	0	0
33	FW	(Scotland) Evan Mooney	0+7	1	0+0	0	0+1	0	0+0	0	8	1
42	DF	(Uganda) Elvis Bwomono	15+10	0	0+0	0	0+1	0	1+1	0	28	0
88	MF	(Republic of Ireland) Killian Phillips	33+1	4	0+0	0	2+0	0	0+0	0	36	4
Players who left the club during the 2024–25 season
1	GK	(England) Ellery Balcombe	21+0	0	1+0	0	0+0	0	4+0	0	26	0
18	DF	(Republic of Ireland) Charles Dunne	4+0	0	0+0	0	0+0	0	0+0	0	4	0
19	DF	(Scotland) Shaun Rooney	6+0	0	1+0	0	0+0	0	3+0	1	10	1
20	FW	(England) Toyosi Olusanya	26+5	8	1+0	0	2+0	2	3+1	2	38	12
21	DF	(England) Jaden Brown	2+4	0	0+1	0	0+0	0	4+0	0	11	0
24	FW	(Scotland) Lewis Jamieson	0+0	0	0+0	0	0+0	0	0+0	0	0	0
25	FW	(Scotland) Kieran Offord	0+0	0	0+0	0	0+0	0	0+0	0	0	0
28	DF	(Scotland) Callum Penman	1+3	0	0+0	0	1+0	0	0+0	0	5	0
29	DF	(Northern Ireland) Gallagher Lennon	0+0	0	0+0	0	0+0	0	0+0	0	0	0
30	MF	(Scotland) Fraser Taylor	0+0	0	1+0	0	0+0	0	0+2	0	3	0
34	FW	(Scotland) Ethan Sutherland	0+1	0	0+1	0	0+0	0	0+0	0	2	0
99	FW	(Netherlands) Kevin van Veen	2+3	0	0+0	0	0+0	0	0+0	0	5	0

=== Goal scorers ===
As of match played 17 May 2025

Number	Position	Nation	Name	Total	Scottish Premiership	League Cup	Scottish Cup	Conference League
3	DF	(England)	Scott Tanser	1	1			
4	DF	(Scotland)	Alex Iacovitti	3	1			2
5	DF	(England)	Richard Taylor	2	2			
6	MF	(Scotland)	Mark O'Hara	5	4			1
7	FW	(Kenya)	Jonah Ayunga	4	4			
8	MF	(Northern Ireland)	Oisin Smyth	4	4			
9	FW	(France)	Mikael Mandron	8	7		1	
10	FW	(Northern Ireland)	Conor McMenamin	4	4			
12	MF	(Republic of Ireland)	Roland Idowu	4	4			
13	MF	(Cyprus)	Alex Gogić	1	1			
15	MF	(Northern Ireland)	Caolan Boyd-Munce	6	5		1	
19	DF	(Scotland)	Shaun Rooney	1				1
20	FW	(England)	Toyosi Olusanya	12	8		2	2
24	DF	(Wales)	Declan John	2	2			
33	FW	(Scotland)	Evan Mooney	1	1			
88	MF	(Republic of Ireland)	Killian Phillips	4	4			
Total				62	52	0	4	6

=== Disciplinary record ===
Includes all competitive matches.

Last updated 17 May 2025

Number	Nation	Position	Name	Total		Scottish Premiership		Scottish Cup		League Cup		Conference League	
Number	Nation	Position	Name	Booked	Sent off (straight red)	Booked	Sent off (straight red)	Booked	Sent off (straight red)	Booked	Sent off (straight red)	Booked	Sent off (straight red)
1	(England)	GK	Ellery Balcombe	2	0	1						1	
2	(England)	DF	Ryan Alebiosu	1	0	1	0						
3	(England)	DF	Scott Tanser	5	2	5	2						
4	(Scotland)	DF	Alex Iacovitti	3	0	3							
5	(England)	DF	Richard Taylor	8	0	6						2	
6	(Scotland)	MF	Mark O'Hara	5	0	4						1	
7	(Kenya)	FW	Jonah Ayunga	3	0	3							
9	(France)	FW	Mikael Mandron	5	0	4						1	
10	(Northern Ireland)	FW	Conor McMenamin	1	0	1							
11	(Scotland)	MF	Greg Kiltie	5	0	5							
12	(Republic of Ireland)	MF	Roland Idowu	4	0	3						1	
13	(Cyprus)	DF	Alex Gogić	13	1	9	1	1		1		2	
15	(Northern Ireland)	MF	Caolan Boyd-Munce	3	0	3							
18	(Republic of Ireland)	DF	Charles Dunne	1	0	1							
19	(Scotland)	DF	Shaun Rooney	3	0	3							
20	(England)	FW	Toyosi Olusanya	9	1	7	1			1		1	
21	(England)	DF	Jaden Brown	1	0	1							
22	(Scotland)	DF	Marcus Fraser	10	1	8	1	1				1	
23	(England)	MF	Dennis Adeniran	1	0	1							
24	(Wales)	DF	Declan John	1	0	1							
28	(Scotland)	DF	Callum Penman	1	0	1							
42	(Uganda)	DF	Elvis Bwomono	4	0	4							
88	(Republic of Ireland)	MF	Killian Phillips	9	0	9							

== Team statistics ==
=== League table ===
Pos	Team	Pld	W	D	L	GF	GA	GD	Pts	Qualification or relegation (Note: Teams play each other three times (33 matches), before the league is split into two groups (the top six and the bottom six).)
4	Dundee United	38	15	8	15	45	54	−9	53	Qualification for the Conference League second qualifying round
5	Aberdeen	38	15	8	15	48	61	−13	53	Qualification for the Europa League play-off round (Note: Aberdeen qualified for the Europa League play-off round as the 2024–25 Scottish Cup winners.)
6	St Mirren	38	14	8	16	53	59	−6	50	
7	Heart of Midlothian	38	15	7	16	52	47	+5	52	
8	Motherwell	38	14	7	17	46	63	−17	49	

Rules for classification: 1) Points; 2) Goal difference; 3) Goals scored; 4) Head-to-head points; 5) Head-to-head goal difference; 6) Play-off (only if deciding champion, UEFA competitions qualification, second stage group allocation or relegation).

=== Division summary ===
Round	1	2	3	4	5	6	7	8	9	10	11	12	13	14	15	16	17	18	19	20	21	22	23	24	25	26	27	28	29	30	31	32	33	34	35	36	37	38
Ground	H	A	H	A	H	H	A	H	A	A	H	H	A	H	A	H	A	A	H	H	A	A	H	A	H	H	A	H	H	A	H	A	H	H	H	A	H	A
Result	W	L	L	D	D	W	L	L	L	L	W	D	W	W	L	L	W	W	W	L	L	L	L	W	L	D	W	L	L	D	W	L	W	D	W	W	D	D
Position	2	6	7	7	7	5	6	6	7	10	7	6	6	6	6	7	6	6	5	5	5	6	7	7	8	7	6	7	7	8	7	7	6	6	6	6	6	6

Updated to match(es) played on 17 May 2025. Source:
A = Away; H = Home; W = Win; D = Draw; L = Loss

== Transfers ==
=== Players in ===
Position	Nationality	Name	From	Transfer Window	Fee	Source
DF	(Scotland)	Shaun Rooney	Fleetwood Town	Summer	Free	
GK	(England)	Ellery Balcombe	Brentford	Summer	Loan	
MF	(Northern Ireland)	Oisin Smyth	Oxford United	Summer	Free	
MF	(Republic of Ireland)	Roland Idowu	Shrewsbury Town	Summer	Loan	
DF	(England)	Jaden Brown	Lincoln City	Summer	Free	
MF	(England)	Dennis Adeniran	Hapoel Petah Tikva	Summer	Free	
DF	(Scotland)	Alex Iacovitti	Port Vale	Summer	Undisclosed	
MF	(Republic of Ireland)	Killian Phillips	Crystal Palace	Summer	Loan	
FW	(Netherlands)	Kevin van Veen	Groningen	Summer	Loan	
DF	(Republic of Ireland)	Charles Dunne		Summer	Re-signed	
DF	(Wales)	Declan John	Bolton Wanderers	Winter	Free	
FW	(Republic of Ireland)	Owen Oseni	Gateshead	Winter	Undisclosed	
GK	(England)	Zach Hemming	Middlesbrough	Winter	Loan	
DF	(England)	Ryan Alebiosu	K.V. Kortrijk	Winter	Loan	

=== Players out ===
Position	Nationality	Name	To	Transfer Window	Fee	Source
MF	(Australia)	Keanu Baccus	Mansfield Town	Summer	Free	
MF	(Scotland)	Ryan Flynn	Arbroath	Summer	Free	
DF	(Australia)	Ryan Strain	Dundee United	Summer	Free	
DF	(Republic of Ireland)	Charles Dunne		Summer	Free	
FW	(New Zealand)	Alex Greive	Bohemian	Summer	Free	
FW	(Scotland)	Kieran Offord	Crusaders	Summer	Loan	
DF	(England)	James Bolton	Fleetwood Town	Summer	Undisclosed	
FW	(Scotland)	Aiden Gilmartin	Darvel	Summer	Free	
FW	(Scotland)	Lewis Jamieson	Raith Rovers	Summer	Loan	
FW	(Scotland)	Ethan Sutherland	Wolverhampton Wanderers	Summer	Undisclosed	
DF	(Northern Ireland)	Gallagher Lennon	Annan Athletic	Summer	Loan	
MF	(Scotland)	Fraser Taylor	Arbroath	Summer	Loan	
MF	(Scotland)	Owen Foster	Cumbernauld Colts	Winter	Loan	
DF	(Scotland)	Shaun Rooney	Fleetwood Town	Winter	Free	
DF	(England)	Jaden Brown		Winter	Free	
DF	(Northern Ireland)	Gallagher Lennon	Bonnyrigg Rose	Winter	Loan	
FW	(Scotland)	Lewis Jamieson	Sacramento Republic	Winter	Undisclosed	
FW	(Scotland)	Kieran Offord	Linfield	Winter	Undisclosed	
DF	(Republic of Ireland)	Charles Dunne	Coleraine	Winter	Free	
DF	(Scotland)	Callum Penman	Arbroath	Winter	Loan	
FW	(England)	Toyosi Olusanya	Houston Dynamo	Summer	Undisclosed	
