= 2025 Scottish League Cup final =

Football games

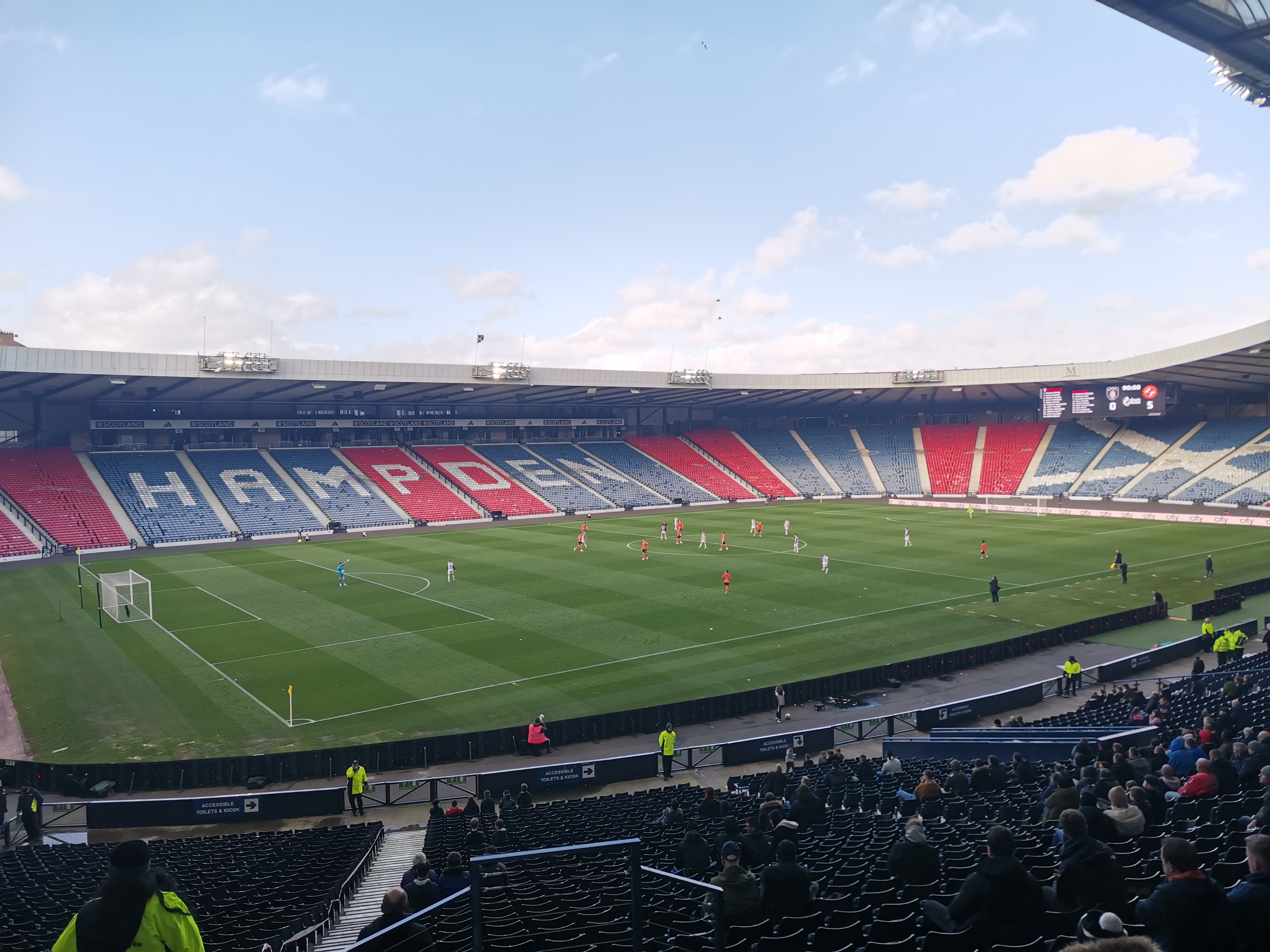
- Hampden Park, venue for the match
- Event: 2025–26 Scottish League Cup
St Mirren	Celtic
3	1
- Date: 14 December 2025
- Venue: Hampden Park, Glasgow
- Man of the Match: Jonah Ayunga
- Referee: Kevin Clancy
- Attendance: 49,914

The 2025 Scottish League Cup final was an association football match that took place at Hampden Park, Glasgow on 14 December 2025. It was the culmination of the 2025–26 Scottish League Cup, the 80th season of the Scottish League Cup (known as the Premier Sports Cup for sponsorship reasons), a competition for the 42 teams in the Scottish Professional Football League (SPFL). It was played between Scottish Premiership clubs Celtic (22-time winners, including in seven of the previous ten seasons) and St Mirren.

St Mirren won the match 3–1, marking their second League Cup victory and their first in 12 years.

== Match ==
=== Details ===
14 December 2025
15:30

St Mirren	3–1	Celtic
Fraser 2'; Ayunga 64', 76'	Report	Hatate 23'

Hampden Park, Glasgow
Attendance: 49,914
Referee: Kevin Clancy

St Mirren	Celtic

GK	1	(England) Shamal George
CB	22	(Scotland) Marcus Fraser (c)	(yellow card) 22'
CB	5	(Jamaica) Richard King
CB	21	(England) Miguel Freckleton
RM	10	(Northern Ireland) Conor McMenamin		(substituted off) 72'
CM	88	(Republic of Ireland) Killian Phillips
CM	25	(Australia) Keanu Baccus
CM	13	(Cyprus) Alex Gogić
LM	24	(Wales) Declan John		(substituted off) 78'
CF	11	(Kenya) Jonah Ayunga	(yellow card) 77'	(substituted off) 81'
CF	14	(England) Dan Nlundulu	(yellow card) 45+4'	(substituted off) 72'
Substitutes:
GK	31	(Scotland) Ryan Mullen
DF	2	(England) Jayden Richardson		(substituted on) 72'
DF	3	(England) Scott Tanser		(substituted on) 78'
MF	4	(Northern Ireland) Liam Donnelly
MF	6	(Scotland) Mark O'Hara
MF	7	(Republic of Ireland) Roland Idowu
MF	30	(Scotland) Fraser Taylor
FW	9	(France) Mikael Mandron		(substituted on) 72'
FW	33	(Scotland) Evan Mooney		(substituted on) 81'
Manager:
(Northern Ireland) Stephen Robinson

GK	1	(Denmark) Kasper Schmeichel
RB	56	(Scotland) Anthony Ralston		(substituted off) 73'
CB	6	(United States) Auston Trusty	(yellow card) 45+4'
CB	5	(Republic of Ireland) Liam Scales
LB	63	(Scotland) Kieran Tierney		(substituted off) 72'
CM	41	(Japan) Reo Hatate
CM	42	(Scotland) Callum McGregor (c)
CM	27	(Belgium) Arne Engels		(substituted off) 84'
RF	23	(Tunisia) Sebastian Tounekti		(substituted off) 72'
CF	17	(Nigeria) Kelechi Iheanacho		(substituted off) 35'
LF	38	(Japan) Daizen Maeda
Substitutes:
GK	12	(Finland) Viljami Sinisalo
DF	51	(Scotland) Colby Donovan		(substituted on) 73'
MF	8	(Sweden) Benjamin Nygren
MF	14	(Scotland) Luke McCowan		(substituted on) 72'
MF	28	(Portugal) Paulo Bernardo
FW	10	(Democratic Republic of the Congo) Michel-Ange Balikwisha
FW	13	(South Korea) Yang Hyun-jun		(substituted on) 84'
FW	24	(Republic of Ireland) Johnny Kenny		(substituted on) 35'
FW	49	(Scotland) James Forrest		(substituted on) 72'
Manager:
(France) Wilfried Nancy
