= Scott Tanser =

English footballer (born 1994)

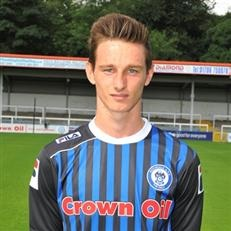
- Tanser in Rochdale kit, 2013

Personal information
- Full name: Scott Tanser
- Date of birth: 23 October 1994 (age 32)
- Place of birth: Blackpool, England
- Height: 1.82 m (5 ft 11 1/2 in)
- Position: Left-back

Team information
- Current team: Falkirk
- Number: 3

Youth career
- Blackpool
- Burnley
- Rochdale

Senior career*
Years	Team	Apps	(Gls)
2013–2017	Rochdale	43	(1)
2017	Port Vale	11	(0)
2017–2021	St Johnstone	117	(5)
2021–2026	St Mirren	150	(6)
2026–	Falkirk	5	(1)
- * Club domestic league appearances and goals as of 14:13, 2 November 2026 (UTC)

Scott Tanser (born 23 October 1994) is an English professional footballer who plays as a left-back for Scottish Premiership club Falkirk.

Tanser made his senior debut for Rochdale in April 2013 and made a total of 57 league and cup appearances for the club before he was allowed to leave for Port Vale in January 2017. He joined Scottish Premiership club St Johnstone five months later. He won the Scottish Cup and Scottish League Cup with St Johnstone in the 2020–21 season. He joined St Mirren in June 2021, winning the Scottish League Cup again in the 2025–26 campaign. He transferred to Falkirk in June 2026.

== Career ==
=== Rochdale ===
Tanser spent time in the youth teams at Blackpool and Burnley, before coming through the Rochdale Academy. He made his professional debut for the "Dale" after coming on as a 70th-minute substitute for D'Arcy O'Connor in a 1–0 victory over Plymouth Argyle at Spotland Stadium on 27 April 2013. This was his only appearance of the 2012–13 season and he did not feature in the 2013–14 campaign as Rochdale secured promotion out of League Two. He broke into the first team at the start of the 2014–15 season and signed a two-year contract extension in October 2014. Speaking the following month, manager Keith Hill said that Tanser was good enough to win England youth caps but that "politics in football, the bureaucracy and the propaganda" prevented lower league players from receiving a call-up. Tanser scored his first goal in senior football on 17 January 2015, opening the scoring with a "well-controlled, left-foot volley" as Rochdale recorded a 4–1 home victory over Crawley Town; he was named on the Football League team of the week. He ended the season with 30 League One appearances to his name.

He scored his second career goal on his first appearance of the 2015–16 season, as Rochdale beat Chesterfield 2–1 in the Football League Trophy on 6 October. He maintained a first-team place and played ten further games before falling out of the first-team picture completely; his appearance against Bury on 6 December proved to be his last of the season. He played just five league games in the first half of the 2016–17 campaign, and his contract was cancelled by mutual consent in January 2017 to allow him to find first-team football elsewhere.

=== Port Vale ===
Tanser signed a contract with League One rivals Port Vale on 27 January 2017 to run until the end of the 2016–17 season. Tanser said that the move "was a bit of a shock actually... one minute I am at Rochdale then the next minute I am signing for Port Vale. It is a bit mad really but that is the way that football is." He was released by manager Michael Brown following the club's relegation in May 2017.

=== St Johnstone ===
Tanser signed a one-year contract with Scottish Premiership club St Johnstone in June 2017. Speaking the following March he stated that "This is the best club I have been at and I have loved it this season... everyone is together here, there are no outcasts in our squad". He made 31 appearances for Tommy Wright's "Saints" during the 2017–18 season as St Johnstone posted an eighth-placed finish. In the summer he told The Courier that he was bulking up to gain greater strength and physicality, saying he was "on a special diet, total protein and six meals a day. So I'm going to be throwing chicken, beef and all sorts of stuff down my neck soon. It's just as well I'm not a vegetarian!"

On 29 December 2018, Tanser scored his first goal for St Johnstone in their 2–0 win over Tayside rivals, Dundee. He signed a new two-year contract extension at the club the following month. He ended the 2018–19 season with 45 appearances to his name, as well as three goals as he scored a penalty in the penultimate game against Motherwell. Speaking in September 2019, Wright said of Tanser that "he is quickly becoming a top class full-back and for me he can go on to become one of the top three or four in the country". Tanser featured in 27 matches of the 2019–20 season, which was curtailed early due to the COVID-19 pandemic in Scotland.

He won the Scottish League Cup with St Johnstone in 2021, though was an unused substitute in the final as they beat Livingston at Hampden Park. St Johnstone went on to complete a cup double by lifting the Scottish Cup with a 1–0 victory over Hibernian, with Tanser again an unused substitute. However, he struggled with injuries towards the end of the 2020–21 season and was linked with moves away from the club, despite manager Callum Davidson being keen to keep hold of him. He was linked with a number of clubs in England's League One.

=== St Mirren ===
On 7 June 2021, Tanser signed a one-year contract with Scottish Premiership club St Mirren, with an option for a further year. He established himself as a popular player at St Mirren Park for what the Daily Record called his "marauding runs down the left flank and his wicked deliveries into the box" and kept his first-team place after Jim Goodwin's departure in February. He signed a two-year contract extension with the club in May 2022. Manager Stephen Robinson commented that Tanser was "one of the best left-backs in this league". In October 2022, Tanser was involved in a car crash that left his wife injured; Robinson said that the accident "puts football into perspective". He featured 35 times across the 2022–23 campaign.

In October 2023, Tanser extended his contract with Saints until the summer of 2026. He said he was very happy after making his 100th club appearance in January. By March, he had made more crosses than any other player in the division that season, creating 28 chances and four assists. He was named in the Premiership Team of the Week after scoring in a 3–1 with at Dundee on 4 May. He ended the 2023–24 season with 42 appearances to his name. He featured 32 times in the 2024–25 campaign, being sent off twice in games against Motherwell and Ross County. The St Mirren website described his sending off at Motherwell as "an incredibly harsh decision".

Tanser achieved his second Scottish League Cup winner's medal, appearing as a substitute in a 3–1 win over Celtic in the 2025 Scottish League Cup final. In April 2026, he was reported to be a summer transfer target for Falkirk. He featured 32 times in the 2025–26 season, including in both legs of the play-off win over Partick Thistle.

=== Falkirk ===
Tanser signed a two-year contract with Scottish Premiership club Falkirk on 1 June 2026. Manager John McGlynn said that "his wealth of experience in the league will help us going forward". He scored his first goal at Falkirk Stadium in a 2–0 win over Celtic on 1 November.

== Career statistics ==
As of match played 25 May 2026

Appearances and goals by club, season and competition
Club	Season	League			National cup (Note: Includes FA Cup, Scottish Cup)		League cup (Note: Includes Football League Cup, Scottish League Cup)		Other		Total	
Club	Season	Division	Apps	Goals	Apps	Goals	Apps	Goals	Apps	Goals	Apps	Goals
Rochdale	2012–13	League Two	1	0	0	0	0	0	0	0	1	0
Rochdale	2013–14	League Two	0	0	0	0	0	0	0	0	0	0
Rochdale	2014–15	League One	30	1	4	0	1	0	1 (Note: Appearances in the Football League Trophy)	0	36	1
Rochdale	2015–16	League One	7	0	2	0	0	0	2	1	11	1
Rochdale	2016–17	League One	5	0	1	0	0	0	3 (Note: Appearances in the EFL Trophy)	0	9	0
Rochdale	Total		43	1	7	0	1	0	6	1	57	2
Port Vale	2016–17	League One	11	0	—		—		—		11	0
St Johnstone	2017–18	Scottish Premiership	29	0	1	0	0	0	1 (Note: Appearance in the UEFA Europa League)	0	31	0
St Johnstone	2018–19	Scottish Premiership	37	3	2	0	6	0	—		45	3
St Johnstone	2019–20	Scottish Premiership	21	0	2	0	4	2	—		27	2
St Johnstone	2020–21	Scottish Premiership	30	2	2	0	4	0	—		36	2
St Johnstone	Total		117	5	7	0	14	2	1	0	139	7
St Mirren	2021–22	Scottish Premiership	31	2	3	0	4	0	—		38	2
St Mirren	2022–23	Scottish Premiership	30	0	2	0	3	0	—		35	0
St Mirren	2023–24	Scottish Premiership	38	2	2	0	5	1	—		45	3
St Mirren	2024–25	Scottish Premiership	29	1	1	0	1	0	1 (Note: Appearance in the UEFA Conference League)	0	32	1
St Mirren	2025–26	Scottish Premiership	22	1	3	0	6	0	2 (Note: Appearances in the play-offs)	0	33	1
St Mirren	Total		150	6	11	0	19	1	3	0	183	7
Falkirk	2026–27	Scottish Premiership	0	0	0	0	0	0	—		0	0
Career total			321	12	25	0	34	3	10	1	390	16

== Honours ==
St Johnstone

- Scottish Cup: 2020–21
- Scottish League Cup: 2020–21

St Mirren

- Scottish League Cup: 2025–26
