= 2021–22 St Mirren F.C. season =

St Mirren
2021–22 season
- Chairman: John Needham
- Manager: Jim Goodwin (until 19 February); Stephen Robinson (from 22 February)
- Stadium: St Mirren Park
- Scottish Premiership: 9th
- Scottish League Cup: Second round
- Scottish Cup: Quarter-final
- Top goalscorer: League: Eamonn Brophy & Connor Ronan (8); All: Eamonn Brophy & Connor Ronan (8)
- Highest home attendance: 6,596 vs. Celtic, Premiership, 22 December 2021
- Lowest home attendance: 500 vs. Dunfermline Athletic, League Cup, 13 July 2021
- Average home league attendance: 4,500
Home colours	Away colours

The 2021–22 season is St Mirren's 4th consecutive season in the top tier of Scottish football since being promoted from the Scottish Championship at the end of the 2017–18 season. The club will also participate in the League Cup and Scottish Cup.

== Season summary ==
St Mirren began the season under the management of Jim Goodwin in his second full season at the club. In July 2021, St Mirren announced that they would now be a fan-owned club after chairman Gordon Scott agreed to sell his majority shareholding to the St Mirren Independent Supporters Association (SMISA). John Needham was then appointed as the new chairman of the club. On 19 February, Jim Goodwin would leave his position as manager to take up the vacant manager's position at Aberdeen. On 22 February, former Motherwell manager Stephen Robinson was appointed as the club's new manager on a two-and-a-half-year deal.

== Results and fixtures ==
Win Draw Loss Postponed

=== Scottish Premiership ===
31 July 2021 1	Dundee	2–2	St Mirren	Dens Park
15:00 BST	Shaughnessy 44' (o.g.); Cummings 66'; Anderson (red card) 69'	Report	Brophy 27'; McGrath 54' (pen.)	Attendance: 2,300; Referee: Craig Napier

7 August 2021 2	St Mirren	1–2	Heart of Midlothian	St Mirren Park
15:00 BST	Shaughnessy 85'; Dennis (red card) 86'	Report	Halliday 16'; Boyce 73'	Attendance: 1,039; Referee: Gavin Duncan

21 August 2021 3	Celtic	6–0	St Mirren	Celtic Park
15:00 BST	Abada 17', 22'; Turnbull 28', 44', 84'; Édouard 62'	Report	Power (red card) 19'	Attendance: 56,052; Referee: William Collum

29 August 2021 4	St Mirren	0–0	St Johnstone	St Mirren Park
15:00 BST	Erhahon (red card) 90+2'	Report		Attendance: 4,326; Referee: David Dickinson

11 September 2021 5	St Mirren	0–0	Dundee United	St Mirren Park
15:00 BST		Report		Attendance: 4,894; Referee: Colin Steven

18 September 2021 6	Hibernian	2–2	St Mirren	Easter Road
15:00 BST	McGinn 56'; Boyle 61' (pen.)	Report	Brophy 42'; Shaughnessy 88'	Attendance: 13,501; Referee: Kevin Clancy

26 September 2021 7	St Mirren	3–2	Aberdeen	St Mirren Park
15:00 BST	Ronan 14', 58'; Main 61'	Report	Brown 18'; Ramirez 34'; Jenks (red card) 51'	Attendance: 4,513; Referee: William Collum

2 October 2021 8	Livingston	0–1	St Mirren	Almondvale Stadium
15:00 BST		Report	Erhahon 29'	Attendance: 1,627; Referee: Grant Irvine

16 October 2021 9	Ross County	2–3	St Mirren	Victoria Park
15:00 BST	Spittal 37'; Iacovitti 66'	Report	Brophy 15'; Fraser 34'; Tanser 38'	Attendance: 3,882; Referee: David Munro

24 October 2021 10	St Mirren	1–2	Rangers	St Mirren Park
12:30 BST	Ronan 4'	Report	Roofe 42' (pen.); Morelos 43'	Attendance: 6,100; Referee: Steven McLean

27 October 2021 11	Motherwell	2–2	St Mirren	Fir Park
19:45 BST	Watt 48', 52' (pen.)	Report	Brophy 74', 78' (pen.)	Attendance: 4,576; Referee: Bobby Madden

30 October 2021 12	St Mirren	0–1	Dundee	St Mirren Park
15:00 BST		Report	Anderson 11'	Attendance: 3,582; Referee: John Beaton

6 November 2021 13	St Johnstone	0–0	St Mirren	McDiarmid Park
15:00 BST	Kane (red card) 86'	Report		Attendance: 3,482; Referee: Greg Aitken

20 November 2021 14	St Mirren	1–1	Livingston	St Mirren Park
15:00 BST	McGrath 68'	Report	Devlin 88'	Attendance: 3,016; Referee: Steven McLean

27 November 2021 15	Heart of Midlothian	2–0	St Mirren	Tynecastle Park
15:00 BST	Mackay-Steven 61'; Kingsley 75'	Report	Shaughnessy (red card) 90+5'	Attendance: 17,311; Referee: Alan Muir

1 December 2021 16	St Mirren	0–0	Ross County	St Mirren Park
19:45 BST		Report		Attendance: 3,806; Referee: David Dickinson

4 December 2021 17	Aberdeen	4–1	St Mirren	Pittodrie Stadium
15:00 BST	Watkins 6', 43'; Ramirez 9', 71'	Report	Tanser 42'	Attendance: 8,002; Referee: William Collum

11 December 2021 18	St Mirren	1–1	Hibernian	St Mirren Park
15:00 BST	Shaughnessy 87'	Report	Campbell 52'	Attendance: 4,698; Referee: Kevin Clancy

22 December 2021 19	St Mirren	0–0	Celtic	St Mirren Park
19:45 BST		Report		Attendance: 6,596; Referee: David Munro

26 December 2021 20	Rangers	2–0	St Mirren	Ibrox Stadium
15:00 BST	Wright 14'; Morelos 26'	Report		Attendance: 500; Referee: Steven McLean

18 January 2022 21	Dundee United	1–2	St Mirren	Tannadice Park
15:00 BST	Power 73' (o.g.)	Report	Henderson 15'; Brophy 60'	Attendance: 4,978; Referee: Alan Muir

25 January 2022 22	St Mirren	1–0	Aberdeen	St Mirren Park
19:45 BST	Ronan 61'	Report		Attendance: 4,829; Referee: Grant Irvine

1 February 2022 23	St Mirren	1–1	Motherwell	St Mirren Park
15:00 BST	Gogić 81'	Report	Tierney 90+2'	Attendance: 4,987; Referee: Euan Anderson

5 February 2022 24	Hibernian	0–1	St Mirren	Easter Road
15:00 BST		Report	Ronan 62'	Attendance: 13,227; Referee: Greg Aitken

9 February 2022 25	St Mirren	2–1	St Johnstone	St Mirren Park
15:00 BST	Ronan 42' (pen.); Greive 49'	Report	Hendry 28' (pen.)	Referee: David Dickinson

19 February 2022 26	Livingston	1–1	St Mirren	Almondvale Stadium
15:00 BST	Anderson 55'	Report	Kiltie 78'; Dunne (red card) 83'	Attendance: 4,286; Referee: William Collum

26 February 2022 28	St Mirren	0–2	Heart of Midlothian	St Mirren Park
15:00 BST	Ronan (red card) 22'	Report	Simms 64'; Devlin 67'	Attendance: 5,767; Referee: Greg Aitken

2 March 2022 29	Celtic	2–0	St Mirren	Celtic Park
19:45 BST	Carter-Vickers 55'; McGregor 81'	Report		Referee: Euan Anderson

5 March 2022 30	Ross County	1–0	St Mirren	Victoria Park
15:00 BST	Hungbo 49' (pen.)	Report		Attendance: 3,229; Referee: David Dickinson

9 March 2022 27	Dundee	0–1	St Mirren	Dens Park
19:45 BST			Ronan 90+3'	Attendance: 5,069; Referee: John Beaton

19 March 2022 31	St Mirren	1–2	Dundee United	St Mirren Park
15:00 BST	Henderson 3'; Alnwick (red card) 89'	Report	Levitt 57'; McNulty 90+6'	Attendance: 5,710; Referee: Nick Walsh

2 April 2022 32	Motherwell	4–2	St Mirren	Fir Park
15:00 BST	Goss 20'; Shields 21'; Cornelius 45'; Tait 78' (o.g.)		Brophy 14'; McCarthy 38'	Referee: Craig Napier

10 April 2022 33	St Mirren	0–4	Rangers	St Mirren Park
12:00 BST		Report	Roofe 2', 45+4', 50'; Aribo 76'	Attendance: 6,583; Referee: John Beaton

23 April 2022 33	St Mirren	0–1	Hibernian	St Mirren Park
15:00 BST		Report	Henderson 74'	Attendance: 4,992; Referee: Euan Anderson

30 April 2022 35	St Johnstone	0–1	St Mirren	McDiarmid Park
15:00 BST		Report	Kiltie 53'	Attendance: 4,253; Referee: Andrew Dallas

7 May 2022 36	St Mirren	2–0	Dundee	St Mirren Park
15:00 BST	Greive 4'; Main 55'	Report		Attendance: 5,564; Referee: David Dickinson

11 May 2022 37	St Mirren	0–0	Livingston	St Mirren Park
19:30 BST		Report		Attendance: 4,554; Referee: Kevin Clancy

15 May 2022 38	Aberdeen	0–0	St Mirren	Pittodrie Stadium
12:15 BST		Report		Attendance: 14,906; Referee: Don Robertson

=== Scottish League Cup ===
==== Group stage ====
10 July 2021 Group Stage	Dumbarton	0–3 (Note: St Mirren were awarded a 3−0 win over Dumbarton, who were unable to field a team after a COVID-19 outbreak amongst their squad.)	St Mirren	Dumbarton Football Stadium
15:00 BST

13 July 2021 Group Stage	St Mirren	1–0	Dunfermline Athletic	St Mirren Park
19:45 BST	Main 30'	Report		Attendance: 500; Referee: Craig Napier

20 July 2021 Group Stage	Stenhousemuir	1–3	St Mirren	Ochilview Park
15:00 BST	Orr 76'	Report	Main 50'; Dennis 66'; Erwin 90+4'	Attendance: 412; Referee: David Dickinson

25 July 2021 Group Stage	St Mirren	2–0	Partick Thistle	St Mirren Park
15:00 BST	McGrath 25' (pen.); Shaughnessy 90+5'	Report		Attendance: 1,023; Referee: Alan Muir

==== Knockout round ====
14 August 2021 Second Round	Livingston	1–1 (4–3 p)	St Mirren	Almondvale Stadium
15:00	Forrest 41'	Report	McCarthy 82'	Attendance: 1,855; Referee: David Munro

=== Scottish Cup ===
22 January 2022 Fourth Round	Ayr United	0–2	St Mirren	Somerset Park
15:00 BST		Report	McAllister 7'; Kiltie 24'	Referee: David Dickenson

12 February 2022 Fifth Round	St Mirren	4–0	Kelty Hearts	St Mirren Park
15:00 BST	Greive 15'; Jones 50'; Kiltie 58', 85'	Report		Attendance: 3,398; Referee: Andrew Dallas

12 March 2022 Quarter-final	Heart of Midlothian	4–2	St Mirren	Tynecastle Park
19:30 BST	Baningime 16'; Haring 29'; McEneff 67'; Simms 85'	Report	Brophy 26'; Ronan 62'	Attendance: 13,899; Referee: Bobby Madden

== Player statistics ==
=== Appearances and goals ===
As of 15 May 2022

No.	Pos	Player	Premiership		League Cup		Scottish Cup		Total	
No.	Pos	Player	Apps	Goals	Apps	Goals	Apps	Goals	Apps	Goals
1	GK	(England) Jak Alnwick	33+0	0	2+0	0	3+0	0	38	0
2	DF	(Scotland) Richard Tait	22+6	0	0+0	0	2+0	0	30	0
3	DF	(England) Scott Tanser	30+1	2	3+0	0	2+1	0	37	2
4	DF	(Republic of Ireland) Joe Shaughnessy	36+0	3	2+0	1	3+0	0	41	4
5	DF	(Republic of Ireland) Conor McCarthy	20+2	1	1+0	1	0+1	0	24	2
6	MF	(Republic of Ireland) Alan Power	32+2	0	2+1	0	2+1	0	40	0
7	MF	(Northern Ireland) Jordan Jones	10+1	0	0+0	0	2+0	1	13	1
8	MF	(Scotland) Ryan Flynn	10+13	0	1+0	0	0+2	0	26	0
9	FW	(Scotland) Eamonn Brophy	23+8	7	2+1	0	1+0	1	35	8
10	FW	(England) Curtis Main	16+15	2	3+0	2	0+0	0	34	4
11	MF	(Scotland) Greg Kiltie	19+6	2	3+0	0	3+0	3	31	5
12	MF	(Scotland) Jay Henderson	11+8	2	2+1	0	1+2	0	25	2
13	MF	(Cyprus) Alex Gogić	12+1	1	0+0	0	2+0	0	15	1
16	MF	(Scotland) Ethan Erhahon	14+9	1	1+2	0	1+1	0	28	1
18	DF	(Republic of Ireland) Charles Dunne	21+1	0	1+0	0	3+0	0	26	0
21	FW	(New Zealand) Alex Greive	9+8	2	0+0	0	1+2	1	20	3
22	DF	(Scotland) Marcus Fraser	35+1	1	3+0	0	2+1	0	42	1
26	GK	(England) Dean Lyness	5+1	0	1+0	0	0+0	0	7	0
31	MF	(Scotland) Fraser Taylor	0+0	0	0+0	0	0+0	0	0	0
38	DF	(Scotland) Dylan McDonald	0+0	0	0+0	0	0+0	0	0	0
40	DF	(Scotland) Luke Kenny	0+0	0	0+0	0	0+0	0	0	0
42	MF	(Scotland) Daniel McManus	0+1	0	0+0	0	0+0	0	1	0
43	MF	(Republic of Ireland) Connor Ronan	25+1	7	0+0	0	3+0	1	29	8
44	DF	(Australia) Matt Millar	9+3	0	0+0	0	0+0	0	12	0
46	FW	(Scotland) Aiden Gilmartin	0+1	0	0+0	0	0+0	0	1	0
Players who left the club during the 2021–22 season
7	MF	(Republic of Ireland) Jamie McGrath	18+0	2	2+1	1	0+0	0	21	3
14	MF	(Scotland) Cameron MacPherson	0+2	0	1+2	0	0+0	0	5	0
15	MF	(Scotland) Dylan Reid	3+0	0	0+0	0	0+0	0	3	0
17	MF	(Scotland) Kyle McAllister	3+8	0	0+1	0	1+0	1	13	1
19	DF	(Northern Ireland) Daniel Finlayson	0+0	0	1+0	0	0+0	0	1	0
20	FW	(England) Kristian Dennis	1+12	0	1+1	1	1+0	0	16	1
23	FW	(Scotland) Lee Erwin	0+3	0	0+3	1	0+0	0	6	1
25	FW	(Scotland) Josh Jack	0+0	0	0+0	0	0+0	0	0	0
27	GK	(Slovakia) Peter Urminský	0+0	0	0+0	0	0+0	0	0	0
33	FW	(Scotland) Kieran Offord	1+1	0	0+0	0	0+0	0	2	0

=== Goal scorers ===
As of match played 15 May 2022

Number	Position	Nation	Name	Total	Scottish Premiership	Scottish League Cup	Scottish Cup
3	DF	(England)	Scott Tanser	2	2		
4	DF	(Republic of Ireland)	Joe Shaughnessy	4	3	1	
5	DF	(Republic of Ireland)	Conor McCarthy	2	1	1	
7	MF	(Republic of Ireland)	Jamie McGrath	3	2	1	
7	MF	(Northern Ireland)	Jordan Jones	1			1
9	FW	(Scotland)	Eamonn Brophy	8	7		1
10	FW	(England)	Curtis Main	4	2	2	
11	MF	(Scotland)	Greg Kiltie	5	2		3
12	MF	(Scotland)	Jay Henderson	2	2		
13	MF	(Cyprus)	Alex Gogić	1	1		
16	MF	(Scotland)	Ethan Erhahon	1	1		
17	MF	(Scotland)	Kyle McAllister	1			1
20	FW	(England)	Kristian Dennis	1		1	
21	FW	(New Zealand)	Alex Greive	3	2		1
22	DF	(Scotland)	Marcus Fraser	1	1		
23	FW	(Scotland)	Lee Erwin	1		1	
43	MF	(Republic of Ireland)	Connor Ronan	8	7		1
Total				48	33	7	8

=== Disciplinary record ===
Includes all competitive matches.

Last updated 15 May 2022

Number	Nation	Position	Name	Total		Scottish Premiership		League Cup		Scottish Cup	
Number	Nation	Position	Name	Booked	Sent off (straight red)	Booked	Sent off (straight red)	Booked	Sent off (straight red)	Booked	Sent off (straight red)
1	(England)	GK	Jak Alnwick	2	1	2	1				
2	(Scotland)	DF	Richard Tait	6	0	6					
3	(England)	DF	Scott Tanser	6	0	5				1	
4	(Republic of Ireland)	DF	Joe Shaughnessy	5	1	5	1				
5	(Republic of Ireland)	DF	Conor McCarthy	2	0	2					
6	(Republic of Ireland)	MF	Alan Power	9	1	7	1	2			
7	(Republic of Ireland)	MF	Jamie McGrath	1	0	1					
8	(Scotland)	MF	Ryan Flynn	3	0	3					
9	(Scotland)	FW	Eamonn Brophy	3	0	3					
10	(England)	FW	Curtis Main	2	0	2					
11	(Scotland)	MF	Greg Kiltie	2	0	2					
13	(Cyprus)	MF	Alex Gogić	2	0	2					
15	(Scotland)	MF	Dylan Reid	1	0	1					
16	(Scotland)	DF	Ethan Erhahon	6	1	4	1	2			
17	(Scotland)	MF	Kyle McAllister	1	0	1					
18	(Republic of Ireland)	DF	Charles Dunne	2	1	2	1				
20	(England)	FW	Kristian Dennis	1	1	1	1				
21	(New Zealand)	FW	Alex Greive	1	0	1					
22	(Scotland)	DF	Marcus Fraser	6	0	6					
33	(Scotland)	FW	Kieran Offord	1	0	1					
43	(Republic of Ireland)	MF	Connor Ronan	2	1	2	1				
44	(Australia)	DF	Matt Millar	1	0	1					

== Team statistics ==
=== League table ===
Pos	Team	Pld	W	D	L	GF	GA	GD	Pts	Qualification or relegation (Note: Teams play each other three times (33 matches), before the league is split into two groups (the top six and the bottom six).)
7	Livingston	38	13	10	15	41	46	−5	49	
8	Hibernian	38	11	12	15	38	42	−4	45	
9	St Mirren	38	10	14	14	33	51	−18	44	
10	Aberdeen	38	10	11	17	41	46	−5	41	
11	St Johnstone (O)	38	8	11	19	24	51	−27	35	Qualification for the Premiership play-off final

Rules for classification: 1) Points; 2) Goal difference; 3) Goals scored; 4) Head-to-head points; 5) Head-to-Head goal difference; 6) Play-off (only if deciding champion, UEFA competitions qualification, second stage group allocation or relegation).
(O) Play-off winners

=== Division summary ===
Round	1	2	3	4	5	6	7	8	9	10	11	12	13	14	15	16	17	18	19	20	21	22	23	24	25	26	27	28	29	30	31	32	33	34	35	36	37	38
Ground	A	H	A	H	H	A	H	A	A	H	A	H	A	H	A	H	A	H	H	A	A	H	H	A	H	A	H	A	A	A	H	A	H	H	A	A	H	H
Result	D	L	L	D	D	D	W	W	W	L	D	L	D	D	L	D	L	D	D	L	W	W	D	W	W	D	L	L	L	W	L	L	L	L	W	W	D	D
Position	4	9	11	11	10	9	8	7	7	7	7	8	8	6	7	8	8	9	9	9	9	8	9	9	6	7	8	8	9	9	9	10	10	10	10	9	8	9

Updated to match(es) played on 15 May 2021. Source:
A = Away; H = Home; W = Win; D = Draw; L = Loss

==== League Cup table ====
Pos	Team	Pld	W	PW	PL	L	GF	GA	GD	Pts	Qualification	STM	DNF	PAR	STE	DUM
1	St Mirren	4	4	0	0	0	9	1	+8	12	Qualification for the second round	—	1–0	2–0	—	—
2	Dunfermline Athletic	4	3	0	0	1	13	5	+8	9	Qualification for the second round	—	—	—	4–1	5–1
3	Partick Thistle	4	2	0	0	2	6	7	−1	6		—	2–4	—	—	2–0
4	Stenhousemuir	4	1	0	0	3	5	10	−5	3		1–3	—	1–2	—	—
5	Dumbarton	4	0	0	0	4	2	12	−10	0		0–3 (Note: St Mirren were awarded a technical 3−0 win over Dumbarton, who were unable to raise a team after a COVID-19 outbreak among players and staff.)	—	—	1–2	—

Rules for classification: 1) goal difference, 2) goals scored, 3) away goals scored, 4) matches won, 5) away matches won, 6) drawing of lots.

== Transfers ==
=== Players in ===
Position	Nationality	Name	From	Transfer Window	Fee	Source
DF	(Republic of Ireland)	Charles Dunne	Motherwell	Summer	Free	
MF	(Scotland)	Greg Kiltie	Kilmarnock	Summer	Free	
FW	(England)	Curtis Main	Shrewsbury Town	Summer	Free	
DF	(England)	Scott Tanser	St Johnstone	Summer	Free	
MF	(Republic of Ireland)	Alan Power	Kilmarnock	Summer	Undisclosed	
FW	(Scotland)	Eamonn Brophy	Kilmarnock	Summer	Free	
DF	(Northern Ireland)	Daniel Finlayson	Rangers	Summer	Undisclosed	
MF	(Republic of Ireland)	Connor Ronan	Wolverhampton Wanderers	Summer	Loan	
DF	(Australia)	Matt Millar	Newcastle Jets	Winter	Free	
FW	(New Zealand)	Alex Greive	Birkenhead United	Winter	Free	
MF	(Northern Ireland)	Jordan Jones	Wigan Athletic	Summer	Loan	
MF	(Cyprus)	Alex Gogić	Hibernian	Summer	Loan	

=== Players out ===
Position	Nationality	Name	To	Transfer Window	Fee	Source
MF	(Republic of Ireland)	Dylan Connolly	Northampton Town	Summer	Free	
MF	(Turkey)	İlkay Durmuş	Lechia Gdańsk	Summer	Free	
FW	(Jamaica)	Junior Morias	King's Lynn Town	Summer	Free	
FW	(England)	Jonathan Obika	Morecambe	Summer	Free	
DF	(Republic of Ireland)	Jake Doyle-Hayes	Hibernian	Summer	Free	
FW	(Scotland)	Lewis Jamieson	Inverness Caledonian Thistle	Summer	Loan	
MF	(Scotland)	Cammy MacPherson	St Johnstone	Summer	Loan	
DF	(Northern Ireland)	Daniel Finlayson	Kelty Hearts	Summer	Loan	
FW	(Scotland)	Josh Jack	Albion Rovers	Winter	Loan	
MF	(Scotland)	Kieran Offord	East Stirlingshire	Winter	Loan	
MF	(Scotland)	Cammy MacPherson	St Johnstone	Summer	Undisclosed	
FW	(Scotland)	Lewis Jamieson	Clyde	Winter	Loan	
GK	(Slovakia)	Peter Urminský	Stenhousemuir	Winter	Loan	
MF	(Scotland)	Kyle McAllister	Partick Thistle	Winter	Loan	
MF	(Republic of Ireland)	Jamie McGrath	Wigan Athletic	Winter	Undisclosed	
FW	(England)	Kristian Dennis	Carlisle United	Winter	Undisclosed	
MF	(Scotland)	Dylan Reid	Queen's Park	Winter	Loan	
FW	(Scotland)	Lee Erwin	Haka	Winter	Free	
