= Jonah Ayunga =

Kenyan footballer (born 1997)

Personal information
- Full name: Jonah Ananias Paul Ayunga
- Date of birth: 24 May 1997 (age 29)
- Place of birth: Beaminster, England
- Height: 6 ft 1 in (1.85 m)
- Position: Forward

Team information
- Current team: St Mirren
- Number: 11

Youth career
- 2007–2015: Bridport

Senior career*
Years	Team	Apps	(Gls)
2015–2016	Dorchester Town	24	(8)
2016–2018	Brighton & Hove Albion	0	(0)
2016–2017	→ Burgess Hill Town (loan)	10	(0)
2017	→ Sligo Rovers (loan)	21	(4)
2017	→ Galway United (loan)	2	(0)
2018	→ Poole Town (loan)	1	(0)
2018–2019	Sutton United	28	(4)
2018	→ Havant & Waterlooville (loan)	4	(2)
2019–2020	Havant & Waterlooville	30	(17)
2020–2021	Bristol Rovers	30	(2)
2021–2022	Morecambe	36	(6)
2022–	St Mirren	87	(12)

International career^{‡}
2024–	Kenya	4	(1)
- * Club domestic league appearances and goals as of 20 May 2026 ‡ National team caps and goals as of 20:00, 15 November 2024 (UTC)

Jonah Ananias Paul Ayunga (born 24 May 1997) is a professional footballer who plays as a winger for Scottish Premiership club St. Mirren. Born in England, he represents the Kenya national team.

== Club career ==
=== Early career ===
Ayunga started his career at Bridport Youth in 2007 and was in the squad for the Dorset County under-16s representative team.

In July 2015, Ayunga went on a trial at Dorchester Town and impressed the side in the pre-season. As a result, Ayunga was signed by Dorchester Town, signing a 12-month contract on 19 July 2015. He made his Dorchester Town debut in the opening game of the season, scoring in a 3–0 win over Histon, followed up by scoring in a 4–2 win over Cirencester Town. By the time of his departure, Ayunga made 31 appearances, scoring seven times during his spell at the club. Dorchester manager, Mark Jermyn described him as "an exciting young talent" and a "strong and powerful center forward".

=== Brighton & Hove Albion ===
It was agreed that Ayunga agreed a move to Brighton & Hove Albion on 31 January 2016. The move was confirmed on 1 February 2016 for £40,000, with the transfer fee being touted as "the biggest receipt in the history of Dorchester Town FC".

He made his debut in a 4–1 friendly defeat to Arsenal U21, his coach at Brighton described him as a "good player and natural goal scorer". It wasn't until on 11 April 2016 when he scored his first Brighton & Hove Albion U23, in a 4–1 win over Newcastle United U23.

In the summer pre-season tour of 2016, Ayunga played against his former club, Dorchester Town, which saw Brighton & Hove Albion U21 won 7–0 in July 2016.

On 24 October 2016, Jonah was sent on a month long loan to English 7th tier side Burgess Hill Town, he scored his first goal at Burgess in a 5-1 thumping of Beaconsfield SYCOB After making 10 appearances, Ayunga's loan spell at Burgess Hill Town came to an end.

On 23 January 2017, Ayunga joined Irish side Sligo Rovers on loan for the 2017 campaign. He made his Sligo Rovers debut in the opening game of the season, in a 5–1 loss against Limerick. However, in a follow-up match against Dundalk on 4 March 2017, he was sent-off for a second bookable offence, in a 4–0 loss. After returning from suspension, Ayunga then scored his first goal for the club, in a 2–0 win over Bohemians on 8 April 2017. He went on to score two more goals against Drogheda United and Limerick. He went on to make 22 appearances and scoring 4 times in all competitions before his loan has terminated on the 31 July 2017.

On 31 July 2017, Ayunga joined Irish side Galway United on loan for the remainder of the 2017 campaign. He made his Galway United debut on 4 August 2017, in a 2–1 win over Finn Harps., Ayunga's loan with Galway United was cut short after just four games through injury.

=== Sutton United ===
Ayunga signed for Sutton United in the summer of 2018, following his release by Brighton. On 4 September 2018, he made his debut during a 1–0 victory over Maidstone United, featuring for 65 minutes before being replaced by Tommy Wright. Just under a month later, he scored his first goal for the club, clinching a 48th-minute winner against promotion hopefuls, Leyton Orient.

On 24 November 2018, Ayunga made the switch to fellow National League side, Havant & Waterlooville on a three-month loan. On the same day, Ayunga went onto net on his debut during a 5–2 victory over Maidstone United, netting Havant's second in the 35th minute. Three days later, he continued his good form, netting a late consolation goal in Havant's 3–1 defeat against Dagenham & Redbridge.

Following his impressive form, Ayunga returned to Sutton prematurely and went onto feature seventeen more times, scoring twice before leaving at the end of the campaign.

=== Havant & Waterlooville ===
On 14 May 2019, Ayunga agreed to return to Havant, following their relegation to the National League South. Before the early conclusion of the season, Ayunga had scored seventeen goals in the league, seeing him win the Golden Boot award in a three-way tie along with McQueen of Dartford and Iaciofano of St Albans City. The season ultimately ended in disappointment for Ayunga and Havant as they were defeated 2–1 in the play off semi-final by Dartford after Ayunga had given his side the lead.

=== Bristol Rovers ===
On 29 July 2020, Ayunga signed for League One side Bristol Rovers for an undisclosed fee, signing a two-year deal.

He made his debut for the club on 5 September 2020, in a 3–0 League Cup defeat to Ipswich Town, replacing Cameron Hargreaves from the bench at half time. He made his first start for the club the following Tuesday in a 2–2 draw against Walsall in the EFL Trophy, a game in which Ayunga also scored his first goal for the club to level the score. On 16 February 2021, Ayunga scored his first league goals for the club in just his second league start, scoring a brace as the Gas defeated Portsmouth to help in their fight against relegation.

=== Morecambe ===
On 26 July 2021, Ayunga returned to League One following Bristol Rovers' relegation to join newly promoted Morecambe for an undisclosed fee, signing a two-year contract. After surviving relegation in their first season, Ayunga was transfer-listed at the end of the 2021–22 season.

=== St Mirren ===
Ayunga signed a two-year contract with St Mirren in June 2022. After rupturing his anterior cruciate ligament in January 2023 he signed a contract extension until summer 2025.

Ayunga scored twice against Celtic in the 2025 Scottish League Cup final, as the Buddies won 3–1 to win their first major trophy since 2013.

== International career ==
Ayunga was born in England to a Kenyan father and English mother. He received his first call up to the Kenya national team on 5 August 2016, but did not make his debut in that camp. In March 2024, he earned a recall to the set-up. Ayunga made his debut for the side on 23 March 2024 as a stoppage-time substitute during their 4–0 win over Malawi. In November 2024, Ayunga scored his first international goal for Kenya in a 1–1 draw with Zimbabwe.

== Personal life ==
Ayunga has a younger brother, Solomon, who's also a footballer and they both attended Beaminster School. While at Beaminster School, Ayunga was also in the school's bobsleigh team.

== Career statistics ==
As of match played 30 December 2025

Appearances and goals by club, season and competition
Club	Season	League			National cup (Note: Includes FA Cup, FAI Cup, Scottish Cup)		League cup (Note: Includes EFL Cup, League of Ireland Cup, Scottish League Cup)		Other		Total	
Club	Season	Division	Apps	Goals	Apps	Goals	Apps	Goals	Apps	Goals	Apps	Goals
Dorchester Town	2015–16	Southern League Premier Division	24	8	2	0	—		5 (Note: One appearance in Southern League Cup, three in FA Trophy, one in Dorset Senior Cup)	0	31	8
Brighton & Hove Albion	2016–17	Championship	0	0	0	0	0	0	—		0	0
Brighton & Hove Albion	2017–18	Premier League	0	0	0	0	0	0	—		0	0
Brighton & Hove Albion	Total		0	0	0	0	0	0	—		0	0
Brighton & Hove Albion U21s	2016–17	—			—		—		1 (Note: Appearance(s) in EFL Trophy)	0	1	0
Burgess Hill Town (loan)	2016–17	Isthmian League Premier Division	10	0	0	0	—		3 (Note: Appearances in FA Trophy)	1	13	1
Sligo Rovers (loan)	2017	League of Ireland Premier Division	21	4	—		1	0	—		22	4
Galway United (loan)	2017	League of Ireland Premier Division	2	0	2	1	—		—		4	1
Poole Town (loan)	2017–18	National League South	1	0	0	0	—		0	0	1	0
Sutton United	2018–19	National League	28	4	3	0	—		2 (Note: One appearance in Scottish Challenge Cup, one appearance in FA Trophy)	0	33	4
Havant & Waterlooville (loan)	2018–19	National League	4	2	—		—		—		4	2
Havant & Waterlooville	2019–20	National League South	30	17	3	1	—		4 (Note: Two appearances four goals in Hampshire Senior Cup, one appearance in FA Trophy, one appearance and one goal in National League South play-offs)	5	37	23
Havant & Waterlooville	Total		34	19	3	1	—		4	5	41	25
Bristol Rovers	2020–21	League One	30	2	1	0	1	0	3	1	35	3
Morecambe	2021–22	League One	36	6	3	0	1	0	2	0	42	6
St Mirren	2022–23	Scottish Premiership	19	3	1	0	4	4	—		24	7
St Mirren	2023–24	Scottish Premiership	17	2	2	0	0	0	—		19	2
St Mirren	2024–25	Scottish Premiership	28	3	0	0	0	0	4 (Note: Appearances in UEFA Conference League)	0	35	3
St Mirren	2025–26	Scottish Premiership	18	2	0	0	8	2	—		26	4
St Mirren	Total		82	10	3	0	16	6	4	0	104	16
Career total			268	58	16	2	19	6	24	7	326	68

== Honours ==
St Mirren

- Scottish League Cup: 2025–26
