= Jacob Devaney =

Irish footballer (born 2007)

Personal information
- Full name: Jacob Patrick John Devaney
- Date of birth: 11 June 2007 (age 19)
- Place of birth: Barnsley, England
- Height: 1.78 m (5 ft 10 in)
- Position: Defensive midfielder

Team information
- Current team: Hibernian (on loan from Manchester United)
- Number: 24

Youth career
- 2013–2025: Manchester United

Senior career*
Years	Team	Apps	(Gls)
2025–	Manchester United	0	(0)
2026	→ St Mirren (loan)	13	(0)
2026–	→ Hibernian (loan)	5	(0)

International career^{‡}
2024–2025	Republic of Ireland U19	5	(0)
2025–	Republic of Ireland U21	14	(0)
- * Club domestic league appearances and goals as of 23:38, 18 October 2026 ‡ National team caps and goals as of 00:04, 18 November 2026 (UTC)

Jacob Patrick John Devaney (/dɛˈveɪniː/, deh-VAY-nee; born 11 June 2007) is a professional footballer who plays as a defensive midfielder for Scottish Premiership club Hibernian, on loan from Premier League club Manchester United, and the Republic of Ireland under-21 team.

== Club career ==
=== Manchester United ===
Devaney joined the Manchester United Academy after being scouted playing locally in Yorkshire and joined their centre of excellence from the age of six years-old. He made his Manchester United U-18 debut at the age of 15 years-old.

Despite a stress fracture that ruled him out of action for over a year, he signed scholarship terms with Manchester United. He had his first experience of training with the Manchester United first team during the 2023-24 season. In May 2025, he was named Manchester United Youth Scholar of the Year. He trained with the first-team squad again under Ruben Amorim in the summer of 2025 pre-season. In the 2025-26 season, he captained the Manchester United U21 side at the age of 18 years-old. In November 2025, he scored a solo goal against Notts County in the EFL Trophy, after running 70 yards.

==== St Mirren loan ====
On 2 February 2026, Devaney joined Scottish Premiership side St Mirren on loan until the end of the season. He made 18 appearances for St Mirren during the 2025–26 season, scoring one goal.

==== Hibernian loan ====
After featuring for Manchester United's first-team during pre-season, on 23 August 2026 he signed for Hibernian on a season-long loan deal with the option of making the transfer permanent.

== International career ==
After declaring for Ireland in 2024, was called up to the Republic of Ireland U19 squad in September 2024. He made his Republic of Ireland U21 debut in June 2025 against Croatia U21.

== Style of play ==
Devaney has been described as a physical and press resistant defensive midfielder. He has also shown the ability to play in central defence at youth level.

== Personal life ==
Born in Barnsley, England, Devaney is the son of football coach and former football player Martin Devaney. He has family in Foxrock, Shankill and Ballina.

== Career statistics ==
=== Club ===
As of match played 10 October 2026

Appearances and goals by club, season and competition
Club	Season	League			National cup (Note: Includes Scottish Cup)		League cup (Note: Includes Scottish League Cup)		Other		Total	
Club	Season	Division	Apps	Goals	Apps	Goals	Apps	Goals	Apps	Goals	Apps	Goals
Manchester United U21	2024–25	—			—		—		2 (Note: Appearance(s) in EFL Trophy)	0	2	0
Manchester United U21	2025–26	—			—		—		3	1	3	1
Manchester United U21	Total		—		—		—		5	1	5	1
St Mirren (loan)	2025–26	Scottish Premiership	13	0	3	1	—		—		16	1
Hibernian (loan)	2026–27	Scottish Premiership	5	0	0	0	1	0	0	0	6	0
Career total			18	0	3	1	1	0	5	1	27	2
