= Evan Mooney =

Scottish footballer (born 2007)

Personal information
- Full name: Evan Andrew Mooney
- Date of birth: 11 December 2007 (age 18)
- Place of birth: Erskine, Renfrewshire, Scotland
- Positions: Midfielder; forward

Team information
- Current team: Arsenal
- Number: 51

Youth career
- –2024: St Mirren

Senior career*
Years	Team	Apps	(Gls)
2024–2026	St Mirren	18	(1)
2026–	Arsenal	0	(0)
- * Club domestic league appearances and goals as of 13:14, 3 February 2026 (UTC)

Evan Andrew Mooney (born 11 December 2007) is a Scottish professional footballer who plays as a midfielder or forward for Premier League club Arsenal.

== Early life ==
Evan Andrew Mooney, the second child of Lorna and Andrew, was born on 11 December 2007 in the town of Erskine, Scotland, where he was raised. His younger brother, Austin, is also a youth footballer for St Mirren.

== Career ==
A product of the St Mirren academy, is described as a winger and made his league debut for the club on 19 October 2024 against Hearts. He scored his first senior goal in St Mirren's 3–2 win at St Johnstone in the Scottish Premiership on 14 December 2024. He signed a professional contract with St Mirren lasting until 2028.

Mooney made an appearance as a second-half substitute as St Mirren defeated Celtic 3–1 in the final of the 2025–26 Scottish League Cup on 14 December 2025.

In February 2026, he signed for English club Arsenal. Although the fee was undisclosed, St Mirren described it as "substantial...with potential for significant future add-ons and a sizeable sell-on clause".

== Career statistics ==
As of match played 20 January 2026

Appearances and goals by club, season and competition
Club	Season	League			National cup (Note: Includes Scottish Cup and FA Cup)		League cup (Note: Includes Scottish League Cup and EFL Cup)		Continental		Other		Total	
Club	Season	Division	Apps	Goals	Apps	Goals	Apps	Goals	Apps	Goals	Apps	Goals	Apps	Goals
St Mirren	2024–25	Scottish Premiership	7	1	1	0	0	0	0	0	—		8	1
St Mirren	2025–26	Scottish Premiership	11	0	1	0	3	0	—		—		15	0
St Mirren	Total		18	1	2	0	3	0	0	0	—		23	1
St Mirren B	2025–26	—			—		—		—		3 (Note: Appearance(s) in Scottish Challenge Cup)	2	3	2
Arsenal	2025–26	Premier League	0	0	0	0	0	0	0	0	—		0	0
Career total			18	1	2	0	3	0	0	0	3	2	26	3

== Honours ==
St Mirren

- Scottish League Cup: 2025–26
