= Richard King (footballer) =

Jamaican footballer (born 2001)

Personal information
- Date of birth: 27 November 2001 (age 24)
- Place of birth: Clarendon, Jamaica
- Height: 1.87 m (6 ft 2 in)
- Position: Defender

Team information
- Current team: St Mirren
- Number: 5

Senior career*
Years	Team	Apps	(Gls)
2021–2025	Cavalier	90	(6)
2023	→ ÍBV (loan)	17	(2)
2025–	St Mirren	32	(2)

International career^{‡}
2022–	Jamaica	45	(2)
Medal record
Men's football
Representing Jamaica
CONCACAF Nations League
Bronze medal – third place	2024 United States	Team
- * Club domestic league appearances and goals as of 20 May 2026 ‡ National team caps and goals as of 22:15, 14 November 2026 (UTC)

Richard King (born 27 November 2001) is a Jamaican professional footballer who plays for Scottish Premiership club St Mirren as a defender and the Jamaica national team. He previously played for Jamaica Premier League (JPL) club Cavalier and for Besta deild karla club ÍBV.

== Club career ==
King played for Cavalier FC in Jamaica.

In 2023, King spent one season on loan at ÍBV in Iceland.

King return to Cavalier in 2024 and lead them to the JPL title.

=== St Mirren ===
In June 2025, King signed with St Mirren in the Scottish Premiership.

== International career ==
King made his senior international debut for Jamaica during a 3–0 loss against Peru on 20 January 2020, and also feature in a WCQ match against Costa Rica.

On 28 May 2025, King scored his first goal for Jamaica, a penalty, during a 3–2 win against Trinidad and Tobago during the 2025 Unity Cup.

== Career statistics ==
=== Club ===
As of match played 22 July 2026

Appearances and goals by club, season and competition
Club	Season	League			National cup (Note: Includes Scottish Cup)		League cup (Note: Includes Scottish League Cup)		Continental		Other		Total	
Club	Season	Division	Apps	Goals	Apps	Goals	Apps	Goals	Apps	Goals	Apps	Goals	Apps	Goals
Cavalier	2021	Jamaica Premier League	9	0	—		—		—		3 (Note: Appearances in Jamaica Premier League play-offs)	0	12	0
Cavalier	2022	Jamaica Premier League	15	2	—		—		—		4	2	19	4
Cavalier	2022–23	Jamaica Premier League	19	0	—		—		—		—		19	0
Cavalier	2023–24	Jamaica Premier League	12	0	—		—		2 (Note: Appearances in CONCACAF Champions Cup)	0	3	1	17	1
Cavalier	2024–25	Jamaica Premier League	35	4	—		—		2	0	5	0	42	4
Cavalier	Total		90	6	—		—		4	0	15	3	109	9
ÍBV (loan)	2023	Besta deild karla	17	2	—		—		—		—		17	2
St Mirren	2025–26	Scottish Premiership	27	1	3	0	7	2	—		5 (Note: Appearances in Relegation play-offs)	1	42	4
St Mirren	2026–27	Scottish Premiership	0	0	0	0	3	0	—		—		3	0
St Mirren	Total		27	1	3	0	10	2	—		5	1	45	4
Career total			134	9	3	0	10	2	4	0	20	3	172	14

=== International ===
As of match played 14 November 2026.

National team	Year	Apps	Goals
Jamaica	2022	10	0
Jamaica	2023	5	0
Jamaica	2024	6	0
Jamaica	2025	17	1
Jamaica	2026	7	1
Total		45	2

Jamaica score listed first, score column indicates score after each King goal

List of international goals scored by Richard King
No.	Date	Venue	Cap	Opponent	Score	Result	Competition
1	28 May 2025	Brentford Community Stadium, London, England	26	Trinidad and Tobago	3–2	3–2	2025 Unity Cup
2	14 November 2026	Independence Park, Kingston, Jamaica	45	Mexico	3–0	3–2	2026–27 CONCACAF Nations League A

== Honors ==
Cavalier

- Jamaica Premier League: 2021, 2023–24, 2024–25
- CONCACAF Caribbean Cup: 2024

St Mirren

- Scottish League Cup: 2025–26

Individual

- CONCACAF Caribbean Cup Best XI: 2024
