= Killian Phillips =

Irish association footballer

Personal information
- Date of birth: 30 March 2002 (age 24)
- Place of birth: San Diego, California, United States
- Height: 1.90 m (6 ft 3 in)
- Position: Attacking midfielder

Team information
- Current team: St Mirren
- Number: 88

Youth career
- 2007–2014: Kilbarrack United
- 2014–2018: Corduff
- 2018–2019: St Kevin's Boys
- 2019–2020: Kilbarrack United
- 2020–2021: Drogheda United

Senior career*
Years	Team	Apps	(Gls)
2021	Drogheda United	30	(2)
2022–2025	Crystal Palace	0	(0)
2023	→ Shrewsbury Town (loan)	19	(3)
2023–2024	→ Wycombe Wanderers (loan)	24	(1)
2024	→ Aberdeen (loan)	10	(0)
2024–2025	→ St Mirren (loan)	35	(4)
2025–	St Mirren	42	(7)

International career^{‡}
2022	Republic of Ireland U20	1	(0)
2023–2024	Republic of Ireland U21	7	(1)
2025–	Republic of Ireland	5	(0)
- * Club domestic league appearances and goals as of 23:32, 18 October 2026 (UTC) ‡ National team caps and goals as of 22:07, 27 September 2026 (UTC)

Killian Phillips (born 30 March 2002) is an Irish footballer who plays as an attacking midfielder for St Mirren. Born in United States, he represents the Republic of Ireland national team.

== Early life ==
Phillips was born in San Diego to Irish parents on 30 March 2002 and moved to Kilbarrack, Dublin as a 5-year-old. He began playing football aged 5 with Kilbarrack United, then moved to Corduff at under-13 level, spending 4 seasons there and playing alongside fellow future senior Republic of Ireland international Bosun Lawal, followed by a stint at St Kevin's Boys before returning to Kilbarrack at 16 after being rejected by Bohemians and Shelbourne at under-17 level, then eventually earning a move to the academy of League of Ireland club Drogheda United where he would play for their under-19 side.

== Club career ==
=== Drogheda United ===
Having been a non-playing substitute in some matches in 2020, Phillips made his debut for Drogheda United in a 1–0 loss at home to Shamrock Rovers on 20 April 2021. The first senior goal of Phillips' career came on 8 May 2021, in a 7–0 win away to Waterford at the RSC as the home side fielded their under-19 squad due to a COVID-19 outbreak in the first team. On 24 October 2021, he scored the only goal of the game as Drogheda beat Derry City at United Park. He made 31 appearances in all competitions during the 2021 season, scoring two goals.

=== Crystal Palace ===
At the end of the season, Phillips had a trial with Crystal Palace and made a permanent move to the Premier League club in January 2022, and spent the rest of the 2021–22 season with the club's under-23 team. In March 2022, he was selected for the Republic of Ireland under-21 squad, but was only involved as a non-playing substitute. He was part of the Crystal Palace first-team squad that travelled to Singapore and Australia before the 2022–23 season and started in the friendly games against Liverpool and Manchester United. Phillips made his competitive senior debut for Crystal Palace on 23 August 2022, starting in a 2–0 win away to Oxford United in the EFL Cup.

==== Loan to Shrewsbury Town ====
On 29 December 2022, it was announced that Phillips would join Shrewsbury Town on loan until the end of the season, once the transfer window opened on 1 January 2023. Despite only featuring for half of the season, Phillips was awarded the Young Player of the Season for his efforts. His performances for the Shrews were described as "immense" by the club's manager Steve Cotterill.

==== Loan to Wycombe Wanderers ====
On 11 August 2023, Phillips signed a new contract with Crystal Palace and on the same day also joined EFL League One club Wycombe Wanderers on a season long loan deal. Phillips scored his first league goal for the club in a 2–1 loss against local rivals Reading on 25 November 2023.

==== Loan to Aberdeen ====
After it was mutually agreed to cut short his loan at Wycombe Wanderers, Phillips joined Scottish club Aberdeen on 28 January 2024 until the end of the season. On 20 April 2024, he featured in the Scottish Cup Semi-final at Hampden Park which ended in heartbreak as he took his side's final penalty in the shootout which was saved by Joe Hart, sending Celtic through to the final.

==== Loan to St Mirren ====
On 21 August 2024, Phillips joined Scottish Premiership club St Mirren on a season-long loan deal. He scored 4 goals in 37 appearances in all competitions during his loan season with the club, before being voted the club's Player of the Year at the end of the season.

=== St Mirren ===
On 22 May 2025 it was announced that Phillips had joined St Mirren on a permanent deal after the club activated their obligation to buy, following his loan spell, joining on a one-year contract with the option of a further season. On 14 December 2025, Phillips played the full match in the 2025 Scottish League Cup final, as his side defeated Celtic 3–1 at Hampden Park to win the first trophy of his career and the club's first in 12 years.

== International career ==
Phillips' first involvement at international level came in March 2022, when he captained a Republic of Ireland U20 team in a 1–0 friendly match defeat against the Republic of Ireland Amateur side at Whitehall Stadium. His performance earned him a call up to the U21 side for their qualifying fixture away to Sweden U21 the following week. He made his debut for the U21 team in a 2–1 friendly win over Iceland U21 at Turners Cross on 26 March 2023. On 21 November 2023, he scored his first goal for his country in a 2–2 draw at home to Italy U21.

On 14 May 2025, he received his first senior call up to the Republic of Ireland national team for their friendly fixtures against Senegal and Luxembourg in June. Phillips made his senior international debut on 6 June 2025, coming off the bench in a 1–1 draw with Senegal at the Aviva Stadium. He made his first start for the side 4 days later in a 0–0 draw away to Luxembourg.

== Career statistics ==
=== Club ===
As of match played on 17 October 2026

Appearances and goals by club, season and competition
Club	Season	League			National cup (Note: Includes FAI Cup, FA Cup, Scottish Cup)		League cup (Note: Includes EFL Cup, Scottish League Cup)		Other		Total	
Club	Season	Division	Apps	Goals	Apps	Goals	Apps	Goals	Apps	Goals	Apps	Goals
Drogheda United	2021	LOI Premier Division	30	2	1	0	—		—		31	2
Crystal Palace	2022–23	Premier League	0	0	—		1	0	—		1	0
Crystal Palace	2023–24	Premier League	0	0	—		—		—		0	0
Crystal Palace	2024–25	Premier League	0	0	—		—		—		0	0
Crystal Palace	Total		0	0	0	0	1	0	—		1	0
Shrewsbury Town (loan)	2022–23	League One	19	3	1	0	—		—		20	3
Wycombe Wanderers (loan)	2023–24	League One	24	1	2	1	1	0	3 (Note: Appearance(s) in the EFL Trophy)	0	30	2
Aberdeen (loan)	2023–24	Scottish Premiership	10	0	3	0	—		—		13	0
St Mirren (loan)	2024–25	Scottish Premiership	35	4	2	0	—		—		37	4
St Mirren	2025–26	Scottish Premiership	37	4	4	0	8	4	2 (Note: Appearances in the 2026 Scottish Premiership Playoffs)	1	51	9
St Mirren	2026–27	Scottish Premiership	5	3	0	0	5	1	–		10	4
St Mirren	Total		42	7	4	0	13	5	2	1	61	13
Career total			160	17	13	1	15	5	5	1	193	24

=== International ===
As of match played 27 September 2026

Appearances and goals by national team and year
National team	Year	Apps	Goals
Republic of Ireland
Republic of Ireland	2025	3	0
Republic of Ireland	2026	2	0
Total		5	0

== Honours ==
St Mirren

- Scottish League Cup: 2025–26

Individual

- St Mirren Player of the Year: 2024–25
