= Miguel Freckleton =

English footballer (born 2003)

Personal information
- Full name: Miguel Oliver Freckleton
- Date of birth: 6 August 2003 (age 23)
- Place of birth: Bristol, England
- Height: 1.93 m (6 ft 4 in)
- Position: Defender

Team information
- Current team: LASK
- Number: 3

Youth career
- Bristol Rovers

Senior career*
Years	Team	Apps	(Gls)
2020–2021	Mangotsfield United	11	(0)
2021–2025	Sheffield United	0	(0)
2022–2023	→ Wealdstone (loan)	14	(1)
2023	→ Yeovil Town (loan)	8	(0)
2024	→ Chesterfield (loan)	16	(0)
2024–2025	→ Swindon Town (loan)	28	(1)
2025–2026	St Mirren	37	(4)
2026–	LASK	6	(0)

International career^{‡}
2026–	Jamaica	3	(0)
- * Club domestic league appearances and goals as of 21:30, 31 October 2026 (UTC) ‡ National team caps and goals as of 22:03, 5 October 2026 (UTC)

Miguel Oliver Freckleton (born 6 August 2003) is a professional footballer who plays as a defender for Austrian Bundesliga club LASK. Born in England, he represents the Jamaica national team.

== Club career ==
=== Early career ===
Freckleton was born in Bristol, England and attended South Gloucestershire and Stroud College in Stroud. He began his career with Bristol Rovers's academy, leaving at the age of 14, After time without a club, he signed for non-league Mangotsfield United.

=== Sheffield United ===
He moved to Sheffield United in December 2021, following a trial and amidst interest from other clubs.

He signed on loan for Wealdstone in November 2022, being recalled in February 2023. The premature end of the loan was intended for Freckleton to play for Sheffield United in the FA Cup, but his paperwork did not clear in time.

He then moved on loan to Yeovil Town, and later spent time on loan with Chesterfield, with whom he won the National League.

He signed on loan for Swindon Town in July 2024. He was "ever-present" in the first team throughout the first half of the season, before suffering an injury which kept him sidelined.

=== St Mirren ===
On 24 July 2025, Freckleton joined Scottish Premiership club St Mirren on a two-year deal for a reported six-figure fee. He played in St Mirren's 2025–26 Scottish League Cup winning team when they defeated Celtic 3-1 in the final.

=== LASK ===
On 2 July 2026, Freckleton joined Austrian Bundesliga club LASK on a three-year deal for an undisclosed fee. He made his European debut for the club.

== International career ==
Freckleton qualified through Jamaica through his father, and was called up to the Jamaica national team in September 2026. On 28 September 2026, Freckleton made his international debut for Jamaica in a 1–0 loss against Honduras.

== Personal life ==
His brother Andre is also a footballer.

== Style of play ==
In November 2026 he was described by the BBC as a "left-footed versatile defender ".

== Career statistics ==
=== Club ===
As of match played 31 October 2026

Appearances and goals by club, season and competition
Club	Season	League			National cup (Note: Includes FA Cup, Scottish Cup, Austrian Cup)		League cup (Note: Includes Scottish League Cup)		Other		Total	
Club	Season	Division	Apps	Goals	Apps	Goals	Apps	Goals	Apps	Goals	Apps	Goals
Mangotsfield United	2019–20	Southern League; Division One South	3	0	0	0	—		0	0	3	0
Mangotsfield United	2020–21	Southern League; Division One South	0	0	0	0	—		0	0	0	0
Mangotsfield United	2021–22	Southern League; Division One South	8	0	2	0	—		0	0	10	0
Mangotsfield United	Total		11	0	2	0	—		0	0	13	0
Sheffield United	2021–22	Championship	0	0	0	0	0	0	0	0	0	0
Sheffield United	2022–23	Championship	0	0	0	0	0	0	—		0	0
Sheffield United	2023–24	Premier League	0	0	0	0	0	0	—		0	0
Sheffield United	2024–25	Championship	0	0	0	0	0	0	—		0	0
Sheffield United	Total		0	0	0	0	0	0	0	0	0	0
Wealdstone (loan)	2022–23	National League	14	1	0	0	—		1 (Note: Appearance in FA Trophy)	0	15	1
Yeovil Town (loan)	2022–23	National League	8	0	—		—		—		8	0
Chesterfield (loan)	2023–24	National League	16	0	4	0	—		1	0	21	0
Swindon Town (loan)	2024–25	League Two	28	1	1	0	1	0	2 (Note: Appearances in EFL Trophy)	0	32	1
St Mirren	2025–26	Scottish Premiership	37	4	4	0	4	0	2 (Note: Appearances in the relegation play-offs)	0	47	4
LASK	2026–27	Austrian Bundesliga	6	0	3	0	0	0	1 (Note: Appearance in UEFA Champions League)	0	10	0
Career total			120	6	14	0	5	0	7	0	146	6

=== International ===
As of match played 5 October 2026

Appearances and goals by national team and year
National team	Year	Apps	Goals
Jamaica	2026	3	0
Total		3	0

== Honours ==
St Mirren

- Scottish League Cup: 2025–26
