= Marcus Fraser (footballer) =

Scottish footballer

Personal information
- Full name: Marcus Fraser
- Date of birth: 23 June 1994 (age 32)
- Place of birth: East Dunbartonshire, Scotland
- Position: Defender

Team information
- Current team: St. Mirren
- Number: 22

Youth career
- Celtic

Senior career*
| Years | Team | Apps | (Gls) |
| 2011–2015 | Celtic | 2 | (0) |
| 2014–2015 | → Cowdenbeath (loan) | 11 | (0) |
| 2015–2020 | Ross County | 168 | (3) |
| 2020– | St Mirren | 211 | (4) |

International career^{‡}
| 2009–2010 | Scotland U16 | 6 | (0) |
| 2010–2011 | Scotland U17 | 16 | (1) |
| 2012 | Scotland U18 | 2 | (0) |
| 2011–2013 | Scotland U19 | 9 | (0) |
| 2012–2014 | Scotland U21 | 5 | (0) |
- * Club domestic league appearances and goals as of 18 May 2026 ‡ National team caps and goals as of 12:33, 19 October 2014 (UTC)

Marcus Fraser (born 23 June 1994) is a Scottish professional footballer who plays as a defender for Scottish Premiership club St Mirren.

== Career ==
=== Celtic ===
Raised in Bishopbriggs, Fraser joined Celtic when he was eight years old, progressing through the youth ranks signing a three-year professional contract in the summer of 2010. Whilst a member of Celtic's under-19 squad, he was called up to the first team for a friendly match against Athletic Bilbao on 26 March 2011. He made his debut the following season, on 3 November 2011, in a 3–1 win against Rennes in the UEFA Europa League, coming on as a substitute at half time and playing in the centre of defence. Fraser made his first start for Celtic in a Scottish Premier League match against Inverness Caledonian Thistle on 9 February 2013.

On 12 September 2014, Fraser joined Scottish Championship club Cowdenbeath on loan. He was released by Celtic in January 2015.

=== Ross County ===
Fraser immediately signed for Ross County. He made his debut for the Highland side on 24 January 2015, in a 1–0 defeat at home to Celtic. On 17 March 2015, Fraser signed a new contract to keep him at Ross County until 2017. A year later he signed a further two-year extension, keeping him under contract until summer 2019.

In June 2018, after Andrew Davies left the club, Fraser became the new captain; he went on to lift the Scottish Championship and Scottish Challenge Cup as Ross County were promoted back to the Scottish Premiership after being relegated a year earlier.

On 5 June 2020, Fraser rejected a new contract at Ross County and left the club after five-and-a-half years and making 195 appearances.

=== St Mirren ===
On 28 July 2020, Fraser signed a one-year deal with St Mirren. In May 2021, he signed a two-year extension to remain at the club until the summer of 2023.

Fraser opened the scoring after just two minutes in the 2025 Scottish League Cup final, as St Mirren ran out 3–1 winners against his former club Celtic. It was the club's first major trophy in 12 years.

=== International ===
Fraser represented Scotland at under-16, under-17, under-18, under-19 and under-21 levels.

== Career statistics ==
As of match played 14 December 2025

Appearances and goals by club, season and competition
| Club | Season | League | | | Scottish Cup | | League Cup | | Other | | Total | |
| Club | Season | Division | Apps | Goals | Apps | Goals | Apps | Goals | Apps | Goals | Apps | Goals |
|---|---|---|---|---|---|---|---|---|---|---|---|---|
| Celtic | 2011–12 | Scottish Premier League | 0 | 0 | 0 | 0 | 0 | 0 | 1 (Note: Appearance in UEFA Europa League) | 0 | 1 | 0 |
| Celtic | 2012–13 | Scottish Premier League | 1 | 0 | 0 | 0 | 0 | 0 | 0 | 0 | 1 | 0 |
| Celtic | 2013–14 | Scottish Premiership | 0 | 0 | 0 | 0 | 0 | 0 | 0 | 0 | 0 | 0 |
| Celtic | 2014–15 | Scottish Premiership | 0 | 0 | 0 | 0 | 0 | 0 | 0 | 0 | 0 | 0 |
| Celtic | Total | | 1 | 0 | 0 | 0 | 0 | 0 | 1 | 0 | 2 | 0 |
| Cowdenbeath (loan) | 2014–15 | Scottish Championship | 11 | 0 | 2 | 0 | 0 | 0 | 0 | 0 | 13 | 0 |
| Ross County | 2014–15 | Scottish Premiership | 16 | 1 | 0 | 0 | 0 | 0 | — | | 16 | 1 |
| Ross County | 2015–16 | Scottish Premiership | 29 | 0 | 4 | 0 | 4 | 0 | — | | 37 | 0 |
| Ross County | 2016–17 | Scottish Premiership | 33 | 0 | 2 | 0 | 0 | 0 | — | | 35 | 0 |
| Ross County | 2017–18 | Scottish Premiership | 38 | 0 | 0 | 0 | 5 | 1 | — | | 43 | 1 |
| Ross County | 2018–19 | Scottish Championship | 26 | 1 | 3 | 0 | 4 | 0 | 3 (Note: Appearances in Scottish Challenge Cup) | 0 | 36 | 1 |
| Ross County | 2019–20 | Scottish Premiership | 26 | 1 | 0 | 0 | 5 | 0 | — | | 31 | 1 |
| Ross County | Total | | 168 | 3 | 9 | 0 | 18 | 1 | 3 | 0 | 198 | 4 |
| St Mirren | 2020–21 | Scottish Premiership | 37 | 1 | 4 | 1 | 7 | 1 | — | | 48 | 3 |
| St Mirren | 2021–22 | Scottish Premiership | 33 | 1 | 3 | 0 | 4 | 0 | — | | 40 | 1 |
| St Mirren | 2022–23 | Scottish Premiership | 34 | 0 | 2 | 0 | 3 | 0 | — | | 40 | 0 |
| St Mirren | 2023–24 | Scottish Premiership | 38 | 1 | 2 | 0 | 6 | 0 | — | | 46 | 1 |
| St Mirren | 2024–25 | Scottish Premiership | 38 | 0 | 2 | 0 | 1 | 0 | 4 (Note: Appearance in UEFA Conference League) | 0 | 45 | 0 |
| St Mirren | 2025–26 | Scottish Premiership | 13 | 1 | 0 | 0 | 6 | 1 | — | | 19 | 2 |
| St Mirren | Total | | 193 | 4 | 13 | 1 | 27 | 2 | 4 | 0 | 237 | 7 |
| Career total | | | 373 | 7 | 24 | 1 | 45 | 3 | 8 | 0 | 450 | 11 |

== Honours ==
Ross County

- Scottish League Cup: 2015–16
- Scottish Championship: 2018–19
- Scottish Challenge Cup: 2018–19

St Mirren

- Scottish League Cup: 2025–26

Individual

- PFA Scotland Team of the Year (Championship): 2018–19
