= Alex Gogić =

Cypriot footballer

Personal information
- Full name: Alexandros Gogić
- Date of birth: 13 April 1994 (age 32)
- Place of birth: Nicosia, Cyprus
- Height: 1.85 m (6 ft 1 in)
- Positions: Centre back; defensive midfielder

Team information
- Current team: St Mirren
- Number: 13

Youth career
- Olympiacos
- 2013–2017: Swansea City

Senior career*
Years	Team	Apps	(Gls)
2017–2020	Hamilton Academical	70	(2)
2020–2022	Hibernian	43	(1)
2022	→ St Mirren (loan)	13	(1)
2022–	St Mirren	150	(7)

International career^{‡}
- Cyprus U19
- Cyprus U21
2020–	Cyprus	29	(0)
- * Club domestic league appearances and goals as of 08:40, 22 November 2026 (UTC) ‡ National team caps and goals as of 15:37, 19 May 2024 (UTC)

Alexandros Gogić (Greek: Αλέξανδρος Γκόγκιτς; Serbian Cyrillic: Александрос Гогић; born 13 April 1994) is a Cypriot professional footballer who plays as a defender and midfielder for Scottish Premiership club St Mirren and the Cyprus national team. He has also previously played for Scottish clubs Hamilton Academical, and Hibernian.

== Early and personal life ==
Gogić is the son of Serbian-born Cypriot international footballer Siniša Gogić.

== Club career ==
Gogić played youth football for Greek club Olympiacos and Welsh club Swansea City. He signed for Scottish club Hamilton Academical in February 2017. In March 2017, Gogić signed a contract extension with Hamilton until May 2018, before signing a further extension, until 2020, in December 2017. On 3 June 2020 he announced that he had left the club.

On 10 July 2020, Gogić signed a two-year contract with Hibernian.

On 31 January 2022, Gogić joined St Mirren, on loan for the rest of the season. He scored on his debut for St Mirren, a 1–1 draw with Motherwell on 1 February. He was released by Hibs in June 2022, at the end of his contract. In August 2022 he signed a two-year contract with St Mirren. In May 2024 Gogić signed a three–year extension to his contract.

== International career ==
He has represented Cyprus at under-19 and under-21 youth levels. He was first selected for the senior Cyprus national team in September 2020, but had to withdraw when he tested positive for COVID-19. Further tests were negative, but he still had to enter a 10-day period of self-isolation that prevented him from playing. He made his senior debut with Cyprus a month later, in a 2–1 friendly loss to the Czech Republic on 7 October.

== Career statistics ==
=== Club ===
As of match played 21 November 2026

Appearances and goals by club, season and competition
Club	Season	League			Scottish Cup		League Cup		Europe		Other		Total	
Club	Season	Division	Apps	Goals	Apps	Goals	Apps	Goals	Apps	Goals	Apps	Goals	Apps	Goals
Hamilton Academical	2016–17	Scottish Premiership	7	0	0	0	0	0	–		2 (Note: Appearances in Premiership play-offs)	0	9	0
Hamilton Academical	2017–18	Scottish Premiership	18	1	1	0	3	0	–		–		22	1
Hamilton Academical	2018–19	Scottish Premiership	16	0	1	0	0	0	–		–		17	0
Hamilton Academical	2019–20	Scottish Premiership	29	1	2	0	5	0	–		–		36	1
Hamilton Academical	Total		70	2	4	0	8	0	0	0	2	0	84	2
Hibernian	2020–21	Scottish Premiership	34	1	4 (Note: One appearance in previous season's Scottish Cup which was rescheduled to October due to COVID-19)	0	1	0	–		–		39	1
Hibernian	2021–22	Scottish Premiership	9	0	0	0	1	0	4 (Note: Appearances in UEFA Conference League)	0	–		14	0
Hibernian	Total		43	1	4	0	2	0	4	0	0	0	53	1
St Mirren (loan)	2021–22	Scottish Premiership	13	1	2	0	0	0	–		–		15	1
St Mirren	2022–23	Scottish Premiership	30	2	2	0	0	0	–		–		32	2
St Mirren	2023–24	Scottish Premiership	38	2	2	1	6	1	–		–		46	4
St Mirren	2024–25	Scottish Premiership	35	1	2	0	1	0	4	0	–		42	1
St Mirren	2025–26	Scottish Premiership	33	2	4	0	8	1	–		2 (Note: Appearances in the relegation play-offs)	0	47	3
St Mirren	2026–27	Scottish Premiership	14	0	0	0	5	0	–		0	0	19	0
St Mirren	Total		150	7	10	1	19	2	4	0	2	0	185	10
Career total			274	11	20	1	30	2	8	0	4	0	336	14

=== International ===
As of 16 July 2021

Appearances and goals by national team and year
National team	Year	Apps	Goals
Cyprus
Cyprus	2020	4	0
Cyprus	2021	3	0
Total		7	0

== Honours ==
St Mirren

- Scottish League Cup: 2025–26
