= Jayden Richardson =

English footballer (born 2000)

Personal information
- Full name: Jayden De'Chante Richardson
- Date of birth: 4 September 2000 (age 26)
- Place of birth: Nottingham, England
- Position: Right back

Team information
- Current team: St Mirren
- Number: 2

Youth career
- –2019: Nottingham Forest

Senior career*
Years	Team	Apps	(Gls)
2019–2022	Nottingham Forest	2	(0)
2019–2020	→ Exeter City (loan)	18	(1)
2020–2021	→ Forest Green Rovers (loan)	32	(0)
2021–2022	→ Notts County (loan)	23	(1)
2022–2024	Aberdeen	19	(0)
2023–2024	→ Stockport County (loan)	11	(0)
2024	→ Colchester United (loan)	10	(0)
2024–2025	Boreham Wood	35	(2)
2025–	St Mirren	34	(0)

International career^{‡}
2026–	Saint Kitts and Nevis	2	(0)
- * Club domestic league appearances and goals as of 18 May 2026 ‡ National team caps and goals as of 17 November 2026

Jayden De'Chante Richardson (born 4 September 2000) is an English professional footballer who plays as a right back for Scottish Premiership club St Mirren. Born in England, he represents the Saint Kitts and Nevis national team.

== Career ==
=== Nottingham Forest ===
After impressing as part of the Nottingham Forest academy, Richardson signed his first professional contract with the club in April 2019. He was named as part of the first team squad ahead of the 2019–20 season.

==== Loan to Exeter City ====
On 16 August 2019, Richardson joined League Two side Exeter City on a season-long loan. He made his professional debut on 20 August 2019, starting a 0–0 draw against Oldham Athletic. He scored his first professional goal against the same club, the first goal in a 5–1 win for Exeter.

==== Loan to Forest Green Rovers ====
On 23 September 2020, Richardson signed for League Two club Forest Green Rovers on a season-long loan.

==== Loan to Notts County ====
On 7 December 2021, Richardson joined National League side Notts County on a one-month loan deal. His loan was extended in January 2022 until the end of season.

=== Aberdeen ===
On 20 June 2022, Richardson signed with Scottish Premiership side Aberdeen.

On 26 July 2023, Richardson joined League Two side Stockport County on a season-long loan deal. However, the deal was cut short in January 2024 and he was loaned again to fellow League Two side Colchester United.

=== Boreham Wood ===
On 20 September 2024, Richardson joined National League South club Boreham Wood.

=== St Mirren ===
Richardson returned to Scottish football in June 2025, signing a two-year contract with St Mirren.

== Career statistics ==
As of match played 6 February 2026

Appearances and goals by club, season and competition
Club	Season	League			National cup (Note: Includes FA Cup, Scottish Cup)		League cup (Note: Includes EFL Cup, Scottish League Cup)		Other		Total	
Club	Season	Division	Apps	Goals	Apps	Goals	Apps	Goals	Apps	Goals	Apps	Goals
Nottingham Forest	2019–20	Championship	0	0	0	0	0	0	—		0	0
Nottingham Forest	2020–21	Championship	0	0	0	0	0	0	—		0	0
Nottingham Forest	2021–22	Championship	2	0	0	0	2	0	—		4	0
Nottingham Forest	Total		2	0	0	0	2	0	—		4	0
Exeter City	2019–20	League Two	18	1	1	0	0	0	9 (Note: Seven appearances in EFL Trophy, two appearances in League Two play-offs)	1	28	2
Forest Green Rovers	2020–21	League Two	32	0	0	0	0	0	4 (Note: Two appearances in EFL Trophy, two appearances in League Two play-offs)	0	36	0
Notts County	2021–22	National League	23	1	0	0	—		—		23	1
Aberdeen	2022–23	Scottish Premiership	19	0	0	0	5	0	—		24	0
Aberdeen	2023-24	Scottish Premiership	0	0	0	0	0	0	—		0	0
Aberdeen	Total		19	0	0	0	5	0	—		24	0
Stockport County (loan)	2023–24	League Two	11	0	2	0	1	0	3 (Note: Appearances in EFL Trophy)	0	17	0
Colchester United (loan)	2023–24	League Two	10	0	—		—		—		10	0
Boreham Wood	2024–25	National League South	35	2	1	0	—		3 (Note: Appearances in National League South play-offs)	0	39	2
St Mirren	2025–26	Scottish Premiership	22	0	2	0	8	3	—		32	3
Career total			172	4	6	0	16	3	19	1	213	8

== Honours ==
Boreham Wood

- National League South play-offs: 2025

St Mirren

- Scottish League Cup: 2025–26

Individual

- National League Team of the Season: 2021–22
