= Roland Idowu =

Irish footballer (born 2002)

Personal information
- Date of birth: 21 January 2002 (age 24)
- Place of birth: Dublin, Ireland
- Height: 1.83 m (6 ft 0 in)
- Position: Midfielder

Team information
- Current team: Botoșani
- Number: 8

Youth career
- St Joseph's Boys
- 2018–2020: Southampton
- 2020–2021: Cardiff City

Senior career*
Years	Team	Apps	(Gls)
2021	Bohemians	5	(0)
2022–2023	Waterford	63	(14)
2024–2025	Shrewsbury Town	9	(0)
2024–2025	→ St Mirren (loan)	31	(4)
2025–2026	St Mirren	28	(0)
2026–	Botoșani	4	(0)

International career
- Republic of Ireland U16
- Republic of Ireland U17
- Republic of Ireland U18
- * Club domestic league appearances and goals as of 1 November 2026

Roland Idowu (born 21 January 2002) is an Irish professional footballer who plays as a midfielder for Liga I club Botoșani.

== Club career ==
=== Early career ===
Born in Dublin, Idowu spent his early career with St Joseph's Boys, Southampton and Cardiff City.

He returned to Ireland in August 2021, signing for Bohemians, before moving to Waterford in January 2022.

=== Shrewsbury Town ===
In December 2023 it was announced that he would sign for English club Shrewsbury Town in January 2024.

On 24 June 2024, Idowu joined Scottish Premiership side St Mirren on a season-long loan deal.

=== St Mirren ===
Idowu signed for St Mirren on a permanent deal in May 2025.

=== Botoșani ===
On 21 August 2026, Idowu signed for Romanian Liga I club Botoșani on a two-year deal for an undisclosed fee.

== International career ==
Idowu represented Ireland at under-16, under-17, and under-18 youth levels. He represented Ireland at the UEFA European Under-17 Championship.

== Style of play ==
He is described as an attacking midfielder, who can also operate on the wing.

== Personal life ==
Idowu has Nigerian heritage. He is close friends with Tunmise Sobowale, with the two being teammates at both Waterford and Shrewsbury.

== Career statistics ==
As of match played 1 November 2026

Appearances and goals by club, season and competition
Club	Season	League			National Cup (Note: Includes FAI Cup, FA Cup, Scottish Cup, Cupa României)		League Cup (Note: Includes Scottish League Cup)		Other		Total	
Club	Season	Division	Apps	Goals	Apps	Goals	Apps	Goals	Apps	Goals	Apps	Goals
Bohemians	2021	LOI Premier Division	5	0	1	1	—		—		6	1
Waterford	2022	LOI First Division	30	5	4	1	—		—		34	6
Waterford	2023	LOI First Division	33	9	2	0	—		4 (Note: Appearances in League of Ireland promotion/relegation play-offs)	0	39	9
Waterford	Total		63	14	6	1	0	0	4	0	73	15
Shrewsbury Town	2023–24	EFL League One	9	0	1	0	—		—		10	0
Shrewsbury Town	2024–25	EFL League One	0	0	0	0	0	0	0	0	0	0
Shrewsbury Town	Total		9	0	1	0	0	0	0	0	10	0
St Mirren (loan)	2024–25	Scottish Premiership	31	4	0	0	1	0	3 (Note: Appearances in the UEFA Conference League)	0	35	4
St Mirren	2025–26	Scottish Premiership	26	0	4	2	6	1	2 (Note: Appearances in the Scottish Premiership promotion/relegation play-offs)	0	38	3
St Mirren	2026–27	Scottish Premiership	2	0	0	0	4	1	—		6	1
St Mirren	Total		28	0	4	2	10	2	2	0	44	4
Botoșani	2026–27	Liga I	4	0	2	1	—		—		6	1
Career total			140	18	14	5	11	2	9	0	173	25

== Honours ==
St Mirren

- Scottish League Cup: 2025–26
