= Greg Kiltie =

Scottish footballer (born 1997)

Personal information
- Date of birth: 18 January 1997 (age 29)
- Place of birth: Irvine, Scotland
- Height: 1.73 m (5 ft 8 in)
- Position: Winger

Team information
- Current team: Kilmarnock
- Number: 11

Senior career*
Years	Team	Apps	(Gls)
2013–2021	Kilmarnock	110	(15)
2014	→ Queen of the South (loan)	3	(0)
2019	→ Greenock Morton (loan)	14	(6)
2019–2020	→ Dunfermline Athletic (loan)	15	(2)
2021–2025	St Mirren	123	(8)
2025–	Kilmarnock	48	(8)

International career^{‡}
2012	Scotland U15	2	(0)
2012	Scotland U16	6	(1)
2013–2014	Scotland U17	6	(2)
2015–2016	Scotland U19	9	(5)
- * Club domestic league appearances and goals as of 08:44, 22 November 2026 (UTC) ‡ National team caps and goals as of 15:15, 7 October 2016 (UTC)

Greg Kiltie (born 18 January 1997) is a Scottish professional footballer who plays as a winger for Kilmarnock.

== Early life ==
Kiltie was born in Irvine. As a nine-year-old child he was a mascot in the Brazil-Australia group game at the 2006 FIFA World Cup, after winning a competition organised by the Sunday Mail. His father Jim is a BT engineer.

== Club career ==
He signed a professional contract with Kilmarnock at the age of 16. He made his senior debut for Kilmarnock on 18 May 2013, as they lost 3–1 at home to St Mirren in a Scottish Premier League game. His debut came at the age of 16 years and four months, making him Kilmarnock's youngest player for 50 years.

On 3 October 2014, Kiltie signed for Scottish Championship club Queen of the South on a one-month loan.

During the 2016–17 season, Kiltie was out for six months following knee surgery in October, then on 20 May 2017, during Kilmarnock's final match of the season against Ross County he was injured during the first half. It was later announced he had suffered a broken ankle and following an operation, he was not able to play again for seven months.

In January 2019 he moved on loan to Greenock Morton.

Kiltie moved on a season-long loan to Dunfermline Athletic on 2 September 2019, with both clubs having a recall option on the loan in January. Kiltie said that he made the move after Kilmarnock manager Angelo Alessio didn't give him a "fair chance". While on loan at Dunfermline, Kiltie scored the opener in a 3–2 win against his parent club's rivals Ayr United on 19 October 2019. Kiltie returned to his parent club in January 2020. On 1 June 2020 he signed a new one-year contract. He left Kilmarnock in June 2021.

He signed for St Mirren on 6 June 2021, on a two-year contract.

Kilt re-signed for Kilmarnock in June 2025.

== International career ==
Kiltie has represented Scotland at every youth international level from under-15 to under-19.

== Career statistics ==
As of match played 21 November 2026

Appearances and goals by club, season and competition
Club	Season	League			Scottish Cup		League Cup		Other		Total	
Club	Season	Division	Apps	Goals	Apps	Goals	Apps	Goals	Apps	Goals	Apps	Goals
Kilmarnock	2012–13	Scottish Premier League	1	0	0	0	0	0	—		1	0
Kilmarnock	2013–14	Scottish Premiership	5	0	0	0	0	0	—		5	0
Kilmarnock	2014–15	Scottish Premiership	8	2	0	0	0	0	—		8	2
Kilmarnock	2015–16	Scottish Premiership	35	6	3	0	2	0	2 (Note: Appearance(s) in the play-offs.)	2	42	8
Kilmarnock	2016–17	Scottish Premiership	11	0	0	0	2	0	—		13	0
Kilmarnock	2017–18	Scottish Premiership	9	0	4	0	0	0	—		13	0
Kilmarnock	2018–19	Scottish Premiership	3	0	1	0	2	0	–		6	0
Kilmarnock	2019–20	Scottish Premiership	10	1	2	1	1	0	1 (Note: Appearances in the UEFA Europa League.)	0	14	2
Kilmarnock	2020–21	Scottish Premiership	28	6	2	2	0	0	2	0	32	8
Kilmarnock	Total		110	15	12	3	7	0	5	2	134	20
Queen of the South (loan)	2014–15	Scottish Championship	3	0	0	0	0	0	0	0	3	0
Greenock Morton (loan)	2018–19	Scottish Championship	14	6	0	0	0	0	0	0	14	6
Dunfermline Athletic (loan)	2019–20	Scottish Championship	15	2	0	0	0	0	1 (Note: Appearance in the Scottish Challenge Cup.)	1	16	3
St Mirren	2021–22	Scottish Premiership	25	2	3	3	4	0	—		32	5
St Mirren	2022–23	Scottish Premiership	35	2	2	0	3	0	0	0	40	2
St Mirren	2023–24	Scottish Premiership	34	4	2	0	4	0	0	0	40	4
St Mirren	2024–25	Scottish Premiership	29	0	1	0	0	0	0	0	30	0
St Mirren	Total		123	8	8	3	11	0	0	0	142	11
Kilmarnock	2025–26	Scottish Premiership	34	4	0	0	5	0	0	0	39	4
Kilmarnock	2026–27	Scottish Premiership	14	4	0	0	6	1	0	0	20	5
Kilmarnock	Total		48	8	0	0	11	1	0	0	59	9
Career total			313	39	20	6	29	1	6	3	368	49
