= Gallagher Lennon =

Northern Irish association football player (born 2005)

Personal information
- Full name: Gallagher Alexander Lennon
- Date of birth: 19 December 2005 (age 20)
- Place of birth: Glasgow, Scotland
- Position: Midfielder

Team information
- Current team: Broxburn Athletic
- Number: 24

Youth career
- –2023: Partick Thistle

Senior career*
Years	Team	Apps	(Gls)
2023–2025	St Mirren	0	(0)
2023	→ Linlithgow Rose (loan)		
2024	→ Dumbarton (loan)	17	(1)
2024	→ Annan Athletic (loan)	7	(0)
2025	→ Bonnyrigg Rose (loan)	16	(0)
2025–	Broxburn Athletic	0	(0)

International career^{‡}
2023–	Northern Ireland U19	4	(1)
- * Club domestic league appearances and goals as of 00:15 (UTC) 3 June 2025 ‡ National team caps and goals as of 22 July 2024

Gallagher Alexander Lennon (born 19 December 2005) is a Northern Irish footballer who plays as a midfielder for Broxburn Athletic. He is a Northern Ireland youth international. He is the son of Neil Lennon.

== Club career ==
A youth player at Partick Thistle, he featured on the substitutes bench for the team without making a debut appearance. He joined St Mirren in 2023. He played for Lowland League side Linlithgow Rose in 2023, prior to signing for Dumbarton on loan from St Mirren in January 2024. He made his debut for Dumbarton in a 1-0 win over Elgin City on 27 January 2024 He scored his first goal for the club on 26 March 2023, in a 6–2 away win against The Spartans.

He joined Annan Athletic on loan in September 2024. He joined Bonnyrigg Rose on loan in January 2025 and made his debut against Edinburgh City on 4 January 2025.

In May 2025, Lennon was released by St Mirren. He signed for Broxburn Athletic in October 2025.

== International career ==
A Northern Ireland youth international, he captained the Northern Ireland national under-19 football team side for the first time in November 2023.

== Personal life ==
Lennon is the son of Northern Ireland former international football player and manager Neil Lennon.
