= Peter Urminský =

Slovak footballer (born 1999)

Personal information
- Date of birth: 24 May 1999 (age 27)
- Height: 6 ft 5 in (1.96 m)
- Position: Goalkeeper

Team information
- Current team: St Mirren

Youth career
- Spartak Trnava

Senior career*
Years	Team	Apps	(Gls)
2018–2020	Spartak Trnava	0	(0)
2019	→ Trenčín (loan)	0	(0)
2020–	St Mirren	1	(0)
2021	→ Ayr United (loan)	1	(0)
2022	→ Stenhousemuir (loan)	10	(0)
2025	→ Glentoran (loan)	0	(0)

International career
- Slovakia U19
- * Club domestic league appearances and goals as of 13:25, 27 May 2023 (UTC)

Peter Urminský (born 24 May 1999) is a Slovak professional footballer who plays as a goalkeeper for St Mirren. Internationally he represented Slovakia at under-19 level.

== Club career ==
Urminský began his club career at Spartak Trnava, moving on loan to Trenčín in February 2019. After being unable to break into Trnava's side due to performances by goalkeeper Dobrivoj Rusov, Urminský signed for Scottish club St Mirren in January 2020. St Mirren's goalkeeper Vaclav Hladky offered to mentor Urminský.

In September 2020 Urminský was ruled out of first-team action after training with players who had tested positive for coronavirus, despite testing negative himself. In February 2021 he joined Ayr United on an emergency 7-day loan. The loan was later extended until the end of the season.

In May 2021 Urminský agreed a new one-year contract with St Mirren. In August 2021 he was praised for his performances for St Mirren B.

Urminský moved on loan to Stenhousemuir in January 2022.

Urminský made his debut for St Mirren in July 2022 during the Scottish League Cup group stage, following an injury to first choice keeper Trevor Carson. In January 2023, he extended his contract until the end of the 2023–24 season. He made his league debut against Rangers on the final day of the 2022–23 season, keeping goal in a 3–0 defeat. In November 2023, his contract was extended until summer 2026. Having made four appearances for the club across all competitions, his contract was further extended in November 2024 until 2027.

After appearing in two of St. Mirren's 2025–26 League Cup group stage games, Urminský joined Glentoran on a season-long loan, with the option of a recall in January, in order to get more gametime in a competitive league. Following an injury in October 2025, Urminský's loan was mutually terminated.

== International career ==
Urminský played for Slovakia U19 during his youth, including in a 1–0 victory against Cyprus U19 in September 2017.
