= Djorkaeff =

Djorkaeff is a surname and a given name. Notable people with the name include:

- Jean Djorkaeff (born 1939), French retired footballer
- Micha Djorkaeff (born 1974), French footballer
- Oan Djorkaeff (born 1997), French footballer
- Youri Djorkaeff (born 1968), French retired international footballer, son of Jean
- Djorkaeff Reasco (born 1999), Ecuadorian footballer
