= 2018–19 St Mirren F.C. season =

St Mirren
2018–19 season
- Chairman: Gordon Scott
- Manager: Alan Stubbs (until 3 September); Oran Kearney (from 7 September)
- Stadium: St Mirren Park
- Premiership: 11th
- League Cup: Second Round lost to Aberdeen
- Scottish Cup: Fifth Round lost to Dundee United
- Top goalscorer: League: Simeon Jackson (6 goals); All: Danny Mullen (7 goals)
- Highest home attendance: 7,288 vs Celtic (14 September 2018)
- Lowest home attendance: 4,001 vs Motherwell (31 October 2018)
- Average home league attendance: 5,381
Home colours	Away colours

The 2018–19 season was the club's first season of play back in the top tier of Scottish football since 2015, having been promoted from the Scottish Championship at the end of the previous season. The club had been relegated from the Premiership at the end of the 2014–15 season. St Mirren will also compete in the League Cup and the Scottish Cup.

== Month by month review ==
=== April ===
- 30 April – the club announced that Stelios Demetriou, John Sutton, Gary Irvine, Massimo Donati, Josh Todd, Darryl Duffy, Darren Whyte and Nathan Flanagan would leave the club when their contracts expire, while Lewis Morgan, Mark Hill and Liam Smith would all return to their parent clubs following the expiry of their loans.

=== May ===
- 2 May – young midfielder Cameron MacPherson signed a six-month contract extension until January 2019, after becoming a regular in the development squad.
- 4 May – goalkeeper Craig Samson signed a contract extension, keeping him at the club until the summer of 2020.
- 9 May – experienced defender Gary MacKenzie signed a one-year contract extension, tying him to the club until 2019.
- 11 May – defender Harry Davis left the club, after rejecting a new contract offer. The popular Englishman cited family reasons for wanting to move back down South. In total Davis played 31 games for Saints, netting 6 goals.
- 14 May – manager Jack Ross was awarded the Scottish Championship Manager of the Year award for season 2017–18.
- 22 May – midfielder Jim Kellerman signed a two-year deal with Saints, after leaving National League side Aldershot Town.
- Also on this day, youth academy player Ben Cameron signed for the club on a two-year development contract.
- 25 May – Saints announced that manager Jack Ross and his assistant James Fowler had left the club to become the new management team at Sunderland. The pair signed two-year deals with the League One side.

Also on this day, Saints signed defender Paul McGinn on a two-year deal from relegated Partick Thistle. McGinn is the brother of Saints captain Stephen McGinn, and previously left Saints in 2013 without playing a game for the club.

Also on this day, Saints were drawn against Kilmarnock, Dumbarton, Queen's Park and Spartans in the group stage of the Betfred Cup.

=== June ===
- 8 June – Alan Stubbs was appointed as the club's new manager, signing a three-year deal.
- 21 June – Saints made a double signing, with defender Josh Heaton and forward Cody Cooke joining the club. Highly rated Heaton signed on a three-year deal from Darlington for a reported fee of £75,000. Cooke signed a two-year contract, and joined from Truro City.
- 22 June – midfielder Jeff King signed on a two-year deal from Bolton Wanderers.
- 23 June – young midfielder Kyle Magennis signed a one-year extension to his current deal, keeping him contracted to the club until 2021. Also on this day Brian Rice was appointed as the club's new Assistant Manager.

=== July ===
- 3 July – last season's top scorer Gavin Reilly left the club on a free transfer, signing for Bristol Rovers.
- 9 July – Saints signed young left back, Hayden Coulson, on a season-long loan from Middlesbrough.
- 11 July – backup goalkeeper Ross Stewart left the club, signing for Livingston on a two-year deal. Saints then moved quickly to sign Aberdeen goalkeeper Danny Rogers on a season-long loan.
- 13 July – forward Myles Hippolyte left the club on a free transfer, signing for Dunfermline Athletic on a two-year deal. Hippolyte spent six months with Saints, scoring one goal in eight appearances.
- Also on this day, defender Cole Kpekawa signed a two-year deal after leaving Colchester United.
- 27 July – midfielder Matty Willock joined on a season-long loan from Manchester United.

=== August ===
- 9 August – Danish striker Nicolai Brock-Madsen signed for Saints on a six-month loan from Birmingham City, with an option of a further six months.
- 10 August – forward Ross C. Stewart left Saints for an undisclosed fee, signing for Scottish Championship side Ross County. He scored three goals in twenty-one appearances for the club.
- 15 August – 20-year old defensive midfielder, Alfie Jones, signed on a season-long loan from Premier League side Southampton.
- 17 August – midfielder Jim Kellerman joined National League side AFC Fylde on a season-long loan, just months after signing a two-year contract with the club. He has made four appearances since joining.

Also on this day, youngster Ethan Erhahon signed a three-year extension with the club.

- 20 August – defender Lee Hodson joined the club on a season-long loan from Premiership rivals Rangers.
- 31 August – midfielder Ryan Edwards joined on a one-year loan from Heart of Midlothian.

=== September ===
- 3 September – after less than three months in charge, manager Alan Stubbs was sacked following a poor start to the season.
- 7 September – Saints appoint Northern Irishman, Oran Kearney, as the new club manager. The former Coleraine boss signs on a three-year contract.
- 10 September – following the sacking of Alan Stubbs, first team coach Darren Jackson also left the club.
- 14 September – experienced defender, Anton Ferdinand, signed for the club until the end of the season. Ferdinand most recently played for Southend United, and is Oran Kearney's first signing for the club.
- 18 September – former Saints boss, Gus MacPherson, resigned as manager of Queens Park to become the club's new Technical Director.
- 21 September – young midfielder, Cammy MacPherson signed a new contract extension – keeping him at the club until the summer of 2020, with a further one-year option.
- 27 September – goalkeeper Dean Lyness signed a short-term deal until January 2019 as cover for the injured Danny Rogers. Lyness was a free agent after leaving Nuneaton Borough in the summer.
- 28 September – Canadian striker Simeon Jackson signed on a short-term deal until January 2019. Jackson has played for several English clubs, and most recently left Walsall in the summer. He becomes Oran Kearney's third signing in three weeks.

=== October ===
- 2 October – Saints signed experienced English midfielder Adam Hammill on a short-term deal. After leaving Barnsley in the summer, Hammill agreed to sign with Saints until January 2019.
- 16 October – loan signing Nicolai Brock-Madsen returned to Birmingham City before the end of his contract, after an unsuccessful time at the club. The Danish striker played five matches, and failed to find the net.
- 17 October – young loanee Hayden Coulson left the club, and returned to Middlesbrough when his stay was cut short. The defender made eleven appearances during his time at the club, scoring once.

=== November ===
- 2 November – striker Simeon Jackson extended his contract, keeping him at the club until the end of the season.
- 9 November – goalkeeper Dean Lyness joined Airdrie on an emergency loan deal. It was then announced that the deal fell through a few days later due to the unexpected retirement of Craig Samson, and Lyness remained with Saints.
- 12 November – former Saints striker Junior Mendes joined the club as new Sports Scientist.
- 13 November – first choice goalkeeper Craig Samson announced his retirement from playing, and left the club to take up a role as goalkeeping coach at Sunderland. Samson made a total of 162 appearances for the club, over two separate spells in Paisley.
- 25 November – Saints were drawn at home to Scottish Championship side Alloa Athletic in the Fourth Round of the Scottish Cup.
- 29 November – the club appointed Jimmy Nicholl as new first-team coach.

=== December ===
- 21 December – midfielder Matty Willock saw his loan deal terminated, and he returned to Manchester United. Willock made 14 appearances for the club.

=== January ===
- 1 January – Jordan Kirkpatrick left the club and returned to Alloa Athletic, the side he left to join Saints. Kirkpatrick suffered injuries during his time at the club, and made only 20 appearances.
- 3 January – two more players left the club, with midfielder Ian McShane joining Falkirk on an 18-month deal, and Adam Hammill joining Scunthorpe United after his short-term deal expired.
- 4 January – defender Josh Heaton joined Kidderminster Harriers on loan until the end of the season. Heaton joined in the summer for £75,000, but has failed to break into the first team.
- 7 January – Oran Kearney continued to reshape the squad by terminating the loan deals of defender Alfie Jones, and midfielder Ryan Edwards. Jones returns to Southampton having played 15 games for the club, and Edwards returns to Heart of Midlothian after making 14 appearances.
- 8 January – midfielder Greg Tansey signed for the club on an 18-month deal, after being released by Aberdeen.
- 9 January – goalkeeper Dean Lyness and youth player Connor O'Keefe left the club after their contracts expired. Summer signing Jeff King was also released early from his two-year contract by mutual agreement.
- 10 January – Saints signed Romanian defender Mihai Popescu on a six-month loan deal from Dinamo București, with an option to buy the player in the summer.

Also on this day midfielder Cammy Smith joined Dundee United for an undisclosed fee, after stating that he wanted to play first team football, and defender Adam Eckersley joined Scottish League One side Forfar Athletic on loan until the end of the season.

- 11 January – Saints signed Czech goalkeeper Václav Hladký from Slovan Liberec on an 18-month deal.
- 15 January – midfielder Brad Lyons signed on loan until the end of the season from Blackburn Rovers. The Northern Irish player previously played under Oran Kearney at Coleraine.
- 18 January – former Saint, Kyle McAllister, and Australian goalkeeper Jordan Holmes joined the club on loan until the end of the season. McAllister joins from Derby County, while Holmes moves from Bournemouth.

Also on this day, defender Anton Ferdinand extends his contract until the end of the season.

- 20 January – Saints were drawn at home to Scottish Championship side Dundee United in the Fifth Round of the Scottish Cup.
- 21 January – defender Cole Kpekawa left the club by mutual consent, having only played eight matches since signing in the summer.
- 23 January – the club successfully appealed the second yellow card that Brad Lyons picked up in the recent Scottish Cup win over Alloa Athletic, meaning that he will be available for the next round match against Dundee United.
- 26 January – Saints recruited two more players, signing Danish winger Anders Dreyer on loan until the end of the season from Brighton & Hove Albion and Croat defender Mateo Mužek from Shakhter Karagandy.
- 31 January – assistant manager Brian Rice left the club, to take over as manager at Hamilton Academical.

Also on this day the club signed Haitian striker Duckens Nazon from Belgian side Sint-Truiden and Romanian defender Laurențiu Corbu from Dinamo Bucureșt, both on loans until the end of the season.

=== February ===
- 1 February – defender Jack Baird signed a two-year contract extension, keeping him tied to the club until 2021.
- 5 February – young forward Cameron Breadner joined Scottish League One side Stenhousemuir on loan until the end of the season.
- 12 February – Adam Eckersley signed a pre-contract with Forfar Athletic, who he is currently on loan with until the end of the season. Eckersley's Saints career is effectively over, having made 42 appearances and scoring once.
- 26 February – 19-year old striker Sam Jamieson joins struggling Brechin City on loan with until the end of the season.

=== March ===
- 18 March – loanee Kyle McAllister earned his first Scotland Under-21 call up for the upcoming matches against Mexico Under-21 and Sweden national Under-21 .

=== April ===
- 13 April – midfielder Greg Tansey revealed that his playing career could be over, after contracting osteomyelitis .

=== May ===
- 2 May – Danish midfielder Anders Dreyer returned to Brighton & Hove Albion and missed the end of the season, after picking up a knee injury. Dreyer scored one goal in his eleven appearances for the club.

== Squad list ==
As of 26 May 2019

No.	Name	Nationality	Position	Date of birth (age)	Signed from	Signed in	Signed until	Apps.	Goals
Goalkeepers
1	Václav Hladký	(Czech Republic)	GK	14 November 1990 (age 35)	Slovan Liberec	2019	2020	21	0
25	Danny Rogers	(Republic of Ireland)	GK	23 March 1994 (age 32)	Aberdeen (loan)	2018	2019	5	0
26	Jordan Holmes	(Australia)	GK	8 May 1997 (age 29)	Bournemouth (loan)	2019	2019	0	0
Defenders
2	Paul McGinn	(Scotland)	DF	22 October 1990 (age 35)	Partick Thistle	2018	2020	44	3
3	Mateo Mužek	(Croatia)	DF	29 April 1995 (age 31)	Shakhter Karagandy	2019	2019	16	0
5	Josh Heaton	(England)	DF	16 September 1996 (age 29)	Darlington	2018	2021	2	0
6	Gary MacKenzie	(Scotland)	DF	15 October 1985 (age 40)	Doncaster Rovers	2016	2019	62	6
15	Jack Baird	(Scotland)	DF	7 February 1996 (age 30)	St Mirren youth team	2014	2021	162	6
16	Mihai Popescu	(Romania)	DF	7 May 1993 (age 33)	Dinamo București (loan)	2019	2019	21	0
21	Lee Hodson	(Northern Ireland)	DF	2 October 1991 (age 34)	Rangers (loan)	2018	2019	23	0
33	Laurențiu Corbu	(Romania)	DF	10 May 1994 (age 32)	Dinamo București (loan)	2019	2019	3	0
35	Anton Ferdinand	(England)	DF	18 February 1985 (age 41)	Southend United	2018	2019	19	0
44	Adam Eckersley	(England)	DF	7 September 1985 (age 41)	FC Edmonton	2017	2019	42	2
Midfielders
4	Stephen McGinn (c)	(Scotland)	MF	2 December 1988 (age 37)	Wycombe Wanderers	2017	2020	190	15
7	Kyle Magennis	(Scotland)	MF	26 August 1998 (age 28)	St Mirren youth team	2016	2021	80	7
8	Ryan Flynn	(Scotland)	MF	4 September 1988 (age 38)	Oldham Athletic	2018	2020	47	2
14	Brad Lyons	(Northern Ireland)	MF	26 May 1997 (age 29)	Blackburn Rovers (loan)	2019	2019	17	1
17	Jim Kellerman	(England)	MF	10 November 1997 (age 28)	Aldershot Town	2018	2020	6	1
22	Greg Tansey	(England)	MF	21 November 1988 (age 37)	Aberdeen	2019	2020	8	0
23	Kyle McAllister	(Scotland)	MF	26 May 1997 (age 29)	Derby County (loan)	2019	2019	36	4
28	Cameron MacPherson	(Scotland)	MF	29 December 1998 (age 27)	St Mirren youth team	2015	2020	23	1
39	Ethan Erhahon	(Scotland)	MF	9 May 2001 (age 25)	St Mirren youth team	2017	2022	24	1
Forwards
9	Duckens Nazon	(Haiti)	FW	7 April 1994 (age 32)	Sint-Truiden (loan)	2019	2019	12	2
11	Simeon Jackson	(Canada)	FW	28 March 1987 (age 39)	Walsall	2018	2019	32	6
18	Danny Mullen	(Scotland)	FW	1 March 1995 (age 31)	Livingston	2017	2020	50	10
20	Cody Cooke	(England)	FW	2 March 1993 (age 33)	Truro City	2018	2020	17	4
36	Sam Jamieson	(Scotland)	FW	14 March 1999 (age 27)	Rangers	2018	TBC	2	0
40	Cameron Breadner	(Scotland)	FW	13 October 2000 (age 25)	St Mirren youth team	2018	TBC	2	0

== Results and fixtures ==
Win Draw Loss Postponed

=== Pre season / Friendlies ===
7 July 2018 Friendly	St Mirren	Cancelled	Bolton Wanderers	St Mirren Park
15:00

21 July 2018 Friendly	St Mirren	0–6	Sunderland	St Mirren Park
15:00		St Mirren report	Maja 22', 71'; Gooch 33' (pen.), 56'; Honeyman 77'; Luke Molyneux 86'	Attendance: 3,133; Referee: John Beaton

=== Scottish Premiership ===
4 August 2018 1	St Mirren	2–1	Dundee	St Mirren Park
15:00	Mullen 8', 83'	BBC Report	Ngwatala 12'	Attendance: 5,470; Referee: Alan Muir

12 August 2018 2	Rangers	2–0	St Mirren	Ibrox Stadium
15:00	Morelos 14'; Goldson 24'	BBC Report		Attendance: 49,680; Referee: Don Robertson

25 August 2018 3	St Mirren	0–2	Livingston	St Mirren Park
15:00		BBC Report	Hamilton 14'; Lithgow 36'	Attendance: 4,347; Referee: John Beaton

1 September 2018 4	Heart of Midlothian	4–1	St Mirren	Tynecastle Park
15:00	Naismith 4' (pen.), 41', 43'; Lee 30'	BBC Report	Dunne 19' (Own goal)	Attendance: 17,714; Referee: Kevin Clancy

14 September 2018 5	St Mirren	0–0	Celtic	St Mirren Park
19:45		Report		Attendance: 7,288; Referee: Andrew Dallas

22 September 2018 6	Hamilton Academical	3–0	St Mirren	New Douglas Park
15:00	Brustad 36'; Miller 40' (pen.), 66'	BBC Report		Attendance: 2,830; Referee: Greg Aitken

29 September 2018 7	St Mirren	0–1	Hibernian	St Mirren Park
15:00		BBC Sport	Gray 14'	Attendance: 6,082; Referee: Euan Anderson

6 October 2018 8	Aberdeen	4–1	St Mirren	Pittodrie Stadium
15:00	Cosgrove 26', 65'; McLennan 30'; Lowe 41'	BBC Report	Jackson 76'	Attendance: 14,003; Referee: Alan Muir

20 October 2018 9	St Mirren	1–2	Kilmarnock	St Mirren Park
15:00	Hammill 14'	BBC Report	Power 56'; Tshibola 68'	Attendance: 5,889; Referee: William Collum

27 October 2018 10	St Johnstone	2–0	St. Mirren	McDiarmid Park
15:00	Wotherspoon 60'; Kennedy 84'	BBC Report		Attendance: 2,716; Referee: Andrew Dallas

31 October 2018 11	St Mirren	0–2	Motherwell	St Mirren Park
19:45		BBC Report	Turnbull 30'; Cadden 47'	Attendance: 4,001; Referee: Kevin Clancy

3 November 2018 12	St Mirren	0–2	Rangers	St Mirren Park
12:30		BBC Report	Candeias 80'; Morelos 90+2'	Attendance: 6,033; Referee: Willie Collum

10 November 2018 13	Dundee	1–1	St Mirren	Dens Park
15:00	K. Miller 33'	BBC Report	Jackson 21' (pen.)	Attendance: 5,552; Referee: Bobby Madden

24 November 2018 14	St Mirren	2–0	Heart of Midlothian	St Mirren Park
15:00	Hammill 46', 55'	BBC Report		Attendance: 5,727; Referee: Craig Napier

1 December 2018 15	St Mirren	1–3	Hamilton Academical	St Mirren Park
15:00	S McGinn 45'	BBC Report	Imrie 21'; Gordon 42'; Keatings 55'	Attendance: 4,334; Referee: Kevin Clancy

5 December 2018 16	Hibernian	2–2	St Mirren	Easter Road
19:45	Shaw 56'; Porteous 73'	BBC Sport	Hammill 6'; P McGinn 67'	Attendance: 15,096; Referee: Euan Anderson

8 December 2018 17	Livingston	3–1	St Mirren
15:00	Pittman 50'; Hardie 64'; Sibbald 88'	BBC Report	Jones 36'	Attendance: 1,727; Referee: Andrew Dallas

15 December 2018 18	St Mirren	1–2	Aberdeen	St Mirren Park
15:00	MacPherson 35'	BBC Report	May 30' (pen.); Cosgrove 61'	Attendance: 4,699; Referee: Greg Aitken

22 December 2018 19	Motherwell	0–1	St Mirren	Fir Park
15:00		BBC Report	Jackson 68'	Attendance: 4,540; Referee: Don Robertson

26 December 2018 20	St Mirren	0–1	St Johnstone	St Mirren Park
14:00		BBC Report	Watt 89'	Attendance: 4,891; Referee: Kevin Clancy

29 December 2018 21	Kilmarnock	2–1	St Mirren	Rugby Park
15:00	Findlay 4'; Jones 11'	BBC Report	Jackson 22'	Attendance: 7,131; Referee: Willie Collum

23 January 2019 22	Celtic	4–0	St Mirren	Celtic Park
19:45	Burke 11', 55'; Sinclair 18' (pen.); Weah 86'	BBC Sport		Attendance: 54,821; Referee: Euan Anderson

27 January 2019 23	St Mirren	1–3	Hibernian	St Mirren Park
13:30	Jackson 24'	BBC Report	Shaw 61'; McGregor 70'; Mallan 87'	Attendance: 5,650; Referee: Steven McLean

2 February 2019 24	Rangers	4–0	St Mirren	Ibrox Stadium
15:00	Tavernier 3' (pen.), 55' (pen.); Defoe 80' (pen.); Kent 81'	BBC Report		Attendance: 49,463; Referee: Andrew Dallas

6 February 2019 25	St Mirren	1–2	Motherwell	St Mirren Park
19:45	P. McGinn 74'	BBC Report	Hastie 10'; Campbell 77'	Attendance: 4,383; Referee: Nick Walsh

16 February 2019 26	Aberdeen	2–2	St Mirren	Pittodrie Stadium
15:00	Ferguson 32'; Cosgrove 77'	BBC Report	Nazon 20' (pen.); McAllister 61'	Attendance: 14,701; Referee: Craig Thomson

23 February 2019 27	Heart of Midlothian	1–1	St. Mirren	Tynecastle Park
15:00	Dikamona 56'	BBC Report	Clare 66' (o.g.)	Attendance: 16,705; Referee: Don Robertson

2 March 2019 28	St Mirren	1–0	Livingston	St Mirren Park
15:00	Flynn 89'	BBC Report		Attendance: 4,014; Referee: Nick Walsh

11 March 2019 29	St Mirren	0–1	Kilmarnock	St Mirren Park
19:45		BBC Report	Millar 87'	Attendance: 4,458; Referee: Don Robertson

16 March 2019 30	St Johnstone	P–P	St Mirren	McDiarmid Park
15:00 GMT		Report
Note: Match postponed due to a waterlogged pitch.

27 March 2019 30	St Johnstone	1–0	St Mirren	McDiarmid Park
19:45	Kane 13'	BBC Report		Attendance: 2,888; Referee: Steven McLean

30 March 2019 31	St Mirren	2–1	Dundee	St Mirren Park
15:00	Mullen 12'; Lyons 57'	BBC Report	Robson 1'	Attendance: 6,733; Referee: Willie Collum

3 April 2019 32	St Mirren	0–2	Celtic	St Mirren Park
19:45		BBC Report	Weah 15'; Christie 85'	Attendance: 6,597; Referee: Don Robertson

6 April 2019 33	Hamilton Academical	1–1	St Mirren	New Douglas Park
15:00	Davies 63'	BBC Report	Dreyer 66' (pen.)	Attendance: 3,096; Referee: John Beaton

20 April 2019 34	Livingston	1–3	St Mirren	Almondvale Stadium
15:00	Robinson 20'	BBC Report	P. McGinn 26'; Mullen 78'; Jackson 80'	Attendance: 2,347; Referee: Willie Collum

27 April 2019 35	St Mirren	1–1	St Johnstone	St Mirren Park
15:00	Mullen 90'	BBC Report	Kane 79'	Attendance: 5,213; Referee: Steven McLean

4 May 2019 36	Motherwell	1–1	St Mirren	Fir Park
15:00	Turnbull 74'	BBC Report	McAllister 90+4'	Attendance: 5,274; Referee: Alan Muir

13 May 2019 37	St Mirren	2–0	Hamilton Academical	St Mirren Park
19:45	McAllister 75'; Magennis 90+6'	BBC Report		Attendance: 6,421; Referee: Willie Collum

18 May 2019 38	Dundee	2–3	St Mirren	Dens Park
12:30	Kerr 14'; Wright 74'	BBC Report	Cooke 51', 58', 76'	Attendance: 5,595; Referee: Alan Muir

=== Premiership play-offs ===
23 May 2019 Final – 1st leg	Dundee United	0–0	St Mirren	Tannadice Park
19:45		BBC Report		Attendance: 11,062; Referee: Bobby Madden

26 May 2019 Final – 2nd leg	St Mirren	1–1 (a.e.t.) (1–1 agg.) (2–0 p)	Dundee United	St Mirren Park
15:00	Mullen 26'	BBC Report	Clark 23' (pen.)	Attendance: 7,732; Referee: John Beaton
	Penalties
	P. McGinn (penalty scored); Popescu (penalty scored); Mužek (penalty missed)		(penalty missed) Pawlett; (penalty missed) Šafranko; (penalty missed) Sow; (penalty missed) Booth

=== Scottish League Cup ===
==== Matches ====
13 July 2018 Group H	Kilmarnock	0–0 (2–3 p)	St Mirren	Rugby Park
19:45		BBC Report		Attendance: 4,026; Referee: Steven McLean
	Penalties
	Erwin (penalty missed); Dicker (penalty missed); Burke (penalty scored); Broadfoot (penalty missed); Millen (penalty scored)		(penalty missed) S. McGinn; (penalty scored) P. McGinn; (penalty missed) King; (penalty scored) Coulson; (penalty scored) Mullen

17 July 2018 Group H	St Mirren	2–2 (5–3 p)	Spartans	St Mirren Park
19:45	S. McGinn 59'; Mullen 75' (pen.)	BBC Report	Jason Stevens 6'; Scott Maxwell 55'	Attendance: 1,430; Referee: Alan Newlands
	Penalties
	(penalty scored) Stewart; (penalty scored) P. McGinn; (penalty scored) Flynn; (penalty scored) Mullen; (penalty scored) Smith		(penalty scored) David Greenhill; (penalty missed) Blair Atkinson; (penalty scored) Harry Girdwood; (penalty scored) Michael Herd

24 July 2018 Group H	Queens Park	0–0 (4–5 p)	St Mirren	Hampden Park
19:45		BBC Report		Attendance: 1,493; Referee: Nick Walsh
	Penalties
	McKernon (penalty missed); Scott Gibson (penalty scored); William Mortimer (penalty scored); Josh Peters (penalty scored); Calvin McGrory (penalty scored); Ciaran Summers (penalty missed); Brendan Sharpe (penalty missed)		(penalty scored) Stewart; (penalty scored) P. McGinn; (penalty scored) Magennis; (penalty missed) Mullen; (penalty scored) S. McGinn; (penalty missed) Coulson; (penalty scored) Flynn

28 July 2018 Group H	St Mirren	6–0	Dumbarton	St Mirren Park
15:00	Coulson 1'; Smith 35', 84'; Stewart 48'; S. McGinn 53'; Kellerman 82'	BBC Report		Attendance: 1,610; Referee: Euan Anderson

18 August 2018 Second Round	Aberdeen	4–0	St Mirren	Pittodrie Stadium
15:00	Mackay-Steven 16', 57' (pen.); Shinnie 20'; May 26'	BBC Report		Attendance: 9,011; Referee: Steven McLean

=== Scottish Cup ===
19 January 2019 Fourth Round	St Mirren	3–2	Alloa Athletic	St Mirren Park
15:00	Cooke 68'; Erhahon 85'; McAllister 87'	BBC Report	Trouten 26'; Cawley 34'	Attendance: 2,760; Referee: Don Robertson

9 February 2019 Fifth Round	St Mirren	1–2	Dundee United	St Mirren Park
15:00	Nazon 77'	BBC Report	Šafranko 15'; Clark 45'	Attendance: 3,965; Referee: Willie Collum

== Player statistics ==
=== Appearances and goals ===
As of 26 May 2019

No.	Pos	Player	Premiership		Premiership play-offs		League Cup		Scottish Cup		Total	
No.	Pos	Player	Apps	Goals	Apps	Goals	Apps	Goals	Apps	Goals	Apps	Goals
1	GK	(Czech Republic) Václav Hladký	17+0	0	2+0	0	0+0	0	2+0	0	21	0
2	DF	(Scotland) Paul McGinn	34+1	3	2+0	0	5+0	0	2+0	0	44	3
3	DF	(Croatia) Mateo Mužek	13+1	0	0+1	0	0+0	0	1+0	0	16	0
4	MF	(Scotland) Stephen McGinn	31+3	1	2+0	0	4+1	2	1+0	0	42	3
6	DF	(Scotland) Gary MacKenzie	5+0	0	2+0	0	0+0	0	0+0	0	7	0
7	MF	(Scotland) Kyle Magennis	11+3	2	2+0	0	2+1	0	0+0	0	19	2
8	MF	(Scotland) Ryan Flynn	20+6	1	1+0	0	3+1	0	2+0	0	33	1
9	FW	(Haiti) Duckens Nazon	6+4	1	0+1	0	0+0	0	1+0	1	12	2
11	FW	(Canada) Simeon Jackson	22+8	6	0+0	0	0+0	0	1+1	0	32	6
14	MF	(Northern Ireland) Brad Lyons	14+1	1	0+0	0	0+0	0	2+0	0	17	1
15	DF	(Scotland) Jack Baird	31+3	0	2+0	0	5+0	0	2+0	0	43	0
16	DF	(Romania) Mihai Popescu	17+0	0	2+0	0	0+0	0	2+0	0	21	0
17	MF	(England) Jim Kellerman	1+2	0	0+0	0	1+2	1	0+0	0	6	1
18	FW	(Scotland) Danny Mullen	16+7	5	1+1	1	4+1	1	0+0	0	30	7
20	FW	(England) Cody Cooke	3+8	3	2+0	0	1+2	0	0+1	1	17	4
21	DF	(Northern Ireland) Lee Hodson	19+1	0	2+0	0	0+0	0	1+0	0	23	0
22	MF	(England) Greg Tansey	4+2	0	0+0	0	0+0	0	2+0	0	8	0
23	MF	(Scotland) Kyle McAllister	8+6	2	2+0	0	0+0	0	0+2	1	18	3
25	GK	(Republic of Ireland) Danny Rogers	4+0	0	0+0	0	1+0	0	0+0	0	5	0
26	GK	(Australia) Jordan Holmes	0+0	0	0+0	0	0+0	0	0+0	0	0	0
28	MF	(Scotland) Cameron MacPherson	10+3	1	0+0	0	2+1	0	1+0	0	17	1
33	DF	(Romania) Laurențiu Corbu	1+2	0	0+0	0	0+0	0	0+0	0	3	0
35	DF	(England) Anton Ferdinand	18+0	0	0+1	0	0+0	0	0+0	0	19	0
36	FW	(Scotland) Sam Jamieson	0+2	0	0+0	0	0+0	0	0+0	0	2	0
39	MF	(Scotland) Ethan Erhahon	19+1	0	0+0	0	0+0	0	1+1	1	22	1
40	FW	(Scotland) Cameron Breadner	0+2	0	0+0	0	0+0	0	0+0	0	2	0
Players who left the club during the season:
1	GK	(Scotland) Craig Samson (retired)	13+0	0	0+0	0	4+0	0	0+0	0	17	0
3	DF	(England) Hayden Coulson (end of loan)	5+1	0	0+0	0	5+0	1	0+0	0	11	1
5	MF	(England) Josh Heaton (on loan to Kidderminster Harriers)	0+0	0	0+0	0	2+0	0	0+0	0	2	0
9	FW	(Denmark) Nicolai Brock-Madsen (end of loan)	3+1	0	0+0	0	1+0	0	0+0	0	5	0
10	MF	(Denmark) Anders Dreyer (end of loan due to injury)	8+2	1	0+0	0	0+0	0	1+0	0	11	1
10	FW	(Scotland) Cammy Smith (transferred to Dundee United)	9+10	0	0+0	0	5+0	2	0+0	0	24	2
14	MF	(Scotland) Jordan Kirkpatrick (transferred to Alloa Athletic)	0+2	0	0+0	0	1+0	0	0+0	0	3	0
16	MF	(Scotland) Ian McShane (transferred to Falkirk)	4+4	0	0+0	0	1+0	0	0+0	0	9	0
17	MF	(England) Jim Kellerman (on loan to AFC Fylde)	0+1	0	0+0	0	1+2	1	0+0	0	4	1
19	DF	(England) Alfie Jones (end of loan)	14+0	1	0+0	0	0+1	0	0+0	0	15	1
19	FW	(Scotland) Ross Stewart (transferred to Ross County)	1+0	0	0+0	0	1+2	1	0+0	0	4	1
22	MF	(England) Matty Willock (end of loan)	7+5	0	0+0	0	2+0	0	0+0	0	14	0
23	MF	(England) Jeff King (released)	0+0	0	0+0	0	1+2	0	0+0	0	3	0
24	DF	(England) Cole Kpekawa (released)	4+0	0	0+0	0	4+0	0	0+0	0	8	0
26	GK	(England) Dean Lyness (released)	4+0	0	0+0	0	0+0	0	0+0	0	4	0
27	MF	(Australia) Ryan Edwards (end of loan)	11+3	0	0+0	0	0+0	0	0+0	0	14	0
44	DF	(England) Adam Eckersley (on loan to Forfar Athletic)	0+0	0	0+0	0	0+0	0	0+0	0	0	0
77	MF	(England) Adam Hammill (transferred to Scunthorpe United)	12+1	4	0+0	0	0+0	0	0+0	0	13	4

=== Goal scorers ===
As of match played 26 May 2019

Place	Position	Nation	Name	Total	Scottish Premiership	Scottish Premiership play-offs	Scottish Cup	Scottish League Cup
1	FW	(Scotland)	Danny Mullen	7	5	1		1
2	FW	(Canada)	Simeon Jackson	6	6			
3	MF	(England)	Adam Hammill	4	4			
3	FW	(England)	Cody Cooke	4	3		1	
5	MF	(Scotland)	Kyle McAllister	3	2		1	
5	DF	(Scotland)	Paul McGinn	3	3			
5	MF	(Scotland)	Stephen McGinn	3	1			2
8	MF	(Scotland)	Kyle Magennis	2	2			
8	FW	(Haiti)	Duckens Nazon	2	1		1	
8	MF	(Scotland)	Cammy Smith	2				2
11	DF	(England)	Hayden Coulson	1				1
11	MF	(Denmark)	Anders Dreyer	1	1			
11	MF	(Scotland)	Ethan Erhahon	1			1	
11	MF	(Scotland)	Ryan Flynn	1	1			
11	DF	(England)	Alfie Jones	1	1			
11	MF	(England)	Jim Kellermann	1				1
11	MF	(Northern Ireland)	Brad Lyons	1	1			
11	MF	(Scotland)	Cameron MacPherson	1	1			
11	FW	(Scotland)	Ross C. Stewart	1				1
—			Own goal	2	2			
Total				47	34	1	4	8

=== Disciplinary record ===
Includes all competitive matches.

Last updated 26 May 2019

Number	Nation	Position	Name	Total		Scottish Premiership		Scottish Premiership play-offs		League Cup		Scottish Cup	
Number	Nation	Position	Name	Booked	Sent off (straight red)	Booked	Sent off (straight red)	Booked	Sent off (straight red)	Booked	Sent off (straight red)	Booked	Sent off (straight red)
2	(Scotland)	DF	Paul McGinn	11	0	10						1	
4	(Scotland)	MF	Stephen McGinn	8	0	6		1		1			
8	(Scotland)	MF	Ryan Flynn	6	1	5	1	1					
27	(Australia)	MF	Ryan Edwards	6	0	6							
15	(Scotland)	DF	Jack Baird	6	0	5						1	
14	(Northern Ireland)	MF	Brad Lyons	5	0 (Note: Brad Lyons 2nd yellow card, and thus red card, in match vs. Alloa Athletic was later rescinded following an appeal.)	4						1	
11	(Canada)	FW	Simeon Jackson	4	1	3	1					1	
1	(Scotland)	GK	Craig Samson	4	0	4							
16	(Romania)	DF	Mihai Popescu	4	0	3		1					
39	(Scotland)	MF	Ethan Erhahon	3	1	3	1						
3	(England)	DF	Hayden Coulson	3	0	3							
18	(Scotland)	FW	Danny Mullen	3	0	2		1					
10	(Scotland)	MF	Cammy Smith	2	0	2							
21	(Northern Ireland)	DF	Lee Hodson	2	0	2							
22	(England)	MF	Matty Willock	2	0	1				1			
23	(Scotland)	MF	Kyle McAllister	2	0	1						1	
35	(England)	DF	Anton Ferdinand	2	0	2							
77	(England)	MF	Adam Hammill	2	0	2							
9	(Haiti)	FW	Duckens Nazon	1	1	1			1				
1	(Czech Republic)	GK	Václav Hladký	1	0	1							
3	(Croatia)	DF	Mateo Mužek	1	0	1							
6	(Scotland)	DF	Gary MacKenzie	1	0	1							
7	(Scotland)	MF	Kyle Magennis	1	0	1							
16	(Scotland)	MF	Ian McShane	1	0	1							
19	(England)	DF	Alfie Jones	1	0	1							
20	(England)	FW	Cody Cooke	1	0	1							
22	(England)	MF	Greg Tansey	1	0	1							
24	(England)	DF	Cole Kpekawa	1	0	1							
28	(Scotland)	MF	Cameron MacPherson	1	0	1							
33	(Romania)	DF	Laurențiu Corbu	1	0	1							

== Team statistics ==
=== League table ===
Pos	Team	Pld	W	D	L	GF	GA	GD	Pts	Qualification or relegation (Note: Teams play each other three times (33 matches), before the league is split into two groups (the top six and the bottom six).)
8	Motherwell	38	15	6	17	46	56	−10	51	
9	Livingston	38	11	11	16	42	44	−2	44	
10	Hamilton Academical	38	9	6	23	28	75	−47	33	
11	St Mirren (O)	38	8	8	22	34	66	−32	32	Qualification for the Premiership play-off final
12	Dundee (R)	38	5	6	27	31	78	−47	21	Relegation to the Championship

Source: Soccerway BBC
Rules for classification: 1) Points; 2) Goal difference; 3) Goals scored; 4) Play-off (only if deciding champion, UEFA competitions qualification and second stage group allocation).
(O) Play-off winners; (R) Relegated

=== Division summary ===
Round	1	2	3	4	5	6	7	8	9	10	11	12	13	14	15	16	17	18	19	20	21	22	23	24	25	26	27	28	29	30	31	32	33	34	35	36	37	38
Ground	H	A	H	A	H	A	H	A	H	A	H	H	A	H	H	A	A	H	A	H	A	H	H	A	H	A	A	H	H	A	H	H	A	A	H	A	H	A
Result	W	L	L	L	D	L	L	L	L	L	L	L	D	W	L	D	L	L	W	L	L	L	L	L	L	D	D	W	L	L	W	L	D	W	D	D	W	W
Position	4	7	10	11	10	11	11	11	11	11	11	11	11	11	11	11	11	12	11	11	11	12	12	12	12	12	12	12	12	12	11	11	11	11	11	11	11	11

Updated to match(es) played on 18 May 2019. Source:
A = Away; H = Home; W = Win; D = Draw; L = Loss

=== League results by opponent ===
Team	Result				Points
Team	Home		Away		Points
Aberdeen	1–2		1–4	2–2	1/9
Celtic	0–0	0–2	0–4		1/9
Dundee	2–1	2–1	1–1	3–2	10/12
Hamilton Academicals	1–3	2–0	0–3	1–1	4/12
Heart of Midlothian	2–0		1–4	1–1	4/9
Hibernian	0–1	1–3	2–2		1/9
Kilmarnock	1–2	0–1	1–2		0/9
Livingston	0–2	1–0	1–3	3–1	6/12
Motherwell	0–2	1–2	1–0	1–1	4/12
Rangers	0–2		0–2	0–4	0/9
St Johnstone	0–1	1–1	0–2	0–1	1/12

=== League Cup table ===
Pos	Team	Pld	W	PW	PL	L	GF	GA	GD	Pts	Qualification	KIL	STM	DUM	QPA	SPA
1	Kilmarnock (Q)	4	3	0	1	0	9	2	+7	10	Qualification for the Second round	—	0–0p	—	2–0	—
2	St Mirren (Q)	4	1	3	0	0	8	2	+6	9	Qualification for the Second round	—	—	6–0	—	p2–2
3	Dumbarton	4	1	1	0	2	3	10	−7	5		2–4	—	—	1–0	—
4	Queen's Park	4	1	0	1	2	2	4	−2	4		—	0–0p	—	—	2–1
5	Spartans	4	0	0	2	2	3	7	−4	2		0–3	—	0–0p	—	—

Rules for classification: 1) goal difference, 2) goals scored, 3) away goals scored, 4) matches won, 5) away matches won, 6) drawing of lots.
(Q) Qualified to the phase indicated

=== Management statistics ===
Last updated on 26 May 2019

Name	From	To	P	W	D	L	Win% (Note: Win% is the percentage of matches won rounded to two decimal places.)
Alan Stubbs	8 June 2018	3 September 2018	9	2	3	4	22.22
Oran Kearney	7 September 2018	Present	38	8	10	20	21.05

== Transfers ==
=== Players in ===
Position	Nationality	Name	From	Transfer Window	Ends	Fee	Source
MF	(Scotland)	Ben Cameron	St Mirren Youth team	Summer	2020	Free	
MF	(England)	Jim Kellerman	Aldershot Town	Summer	2020	Free	
DF	(Scotland)	Paul McGinn	Partick Thistle	Summer	2020	Free	
DF	(England)	Josh Heaton	Darlington	Summer	2021	£75,000	
FW	(England)	Cody Cooke	Truro City	Summer	2020	Free	
MF	(England)	Jeff King	Bolton Wanderers	Summer	2020	Free	
DF	(England)	Hayden Coulson	Middlesbrough	Summer	2020	Loan	
GK	(Republic of Ireland)	Danny Rogers	Aberdeen	Summer	2019	Loan	
DF	(England)	Cole Kpekawa	Colchester United	Summer	2020	Free	
MF	(England)	Matty Willock	Manchester United	Summer	2019	Loan	
FW	(Denmark)	Nicolai Brock-Madsen	Birmingham City	Summer	2019	Loan	
DF	(England)	Alfie Jones	Southampton	Summer	2019	Loan	
DF	(Northern Ireland)	Lee Hodson	Rangers	Summer	2019	Loan	
MF	(Australia)	Ryan Edwards	Heart of Midlothian	Summer	2019	Loan	
DF	(England)	Anton Ferdinand	Southend United	Winter	2019	Free	
GK	(England)	Dean Lyness	Nuneaton Borough	Winter	2019	Free	
FW	(Canada)	Simeon Jackson	Walsall	Winter	2019	Free	
MF	(England)	Adam Hammill	Barnsley	Winter	2019	Free	
MF	(England)	Greg Tansey	Aberdeen	Winter	2019	Free	
DF	(Romania)	Mihai Popescu	Dinamo București	Winter	2019	Loan	
GK	(Czech Republic)	Václav Hladký	Slovan Liberec	Winter	2020	Free	
MF	(Northern Ireland)	Brad Lyons	Blackburn Rovers	Winter	2019	Loan	
MF	(Scotland)	Kyle McAllister	Derby County	Winter	2019	Loan	
GK	(Australia)	Jordan Holmes	Bournemouth	Winter	2019	Loan	
MF	(Denmark)	Anders Dreyer	Brighton & Hove Albion	Winter	2019	Loan	
DF	(Croatia)	Mateo Mužek	Shakhter Karagandy	Winter	2019	Free	
FW	(Haiti)	Duckens Nazon	Sint-Truiden	Winter	2019	Loan	
DF	(Romania)	Laurențiu Corbu	Dinamo București	Winter	2019	Loan	

=== Players out ===
Position	Nationality	Name	To / Type	Transfer Window	Fee	Source
DF	(Cyprus)	Stelios Demetriou	Released	Summer	Free	
MF	(Italy)	Massimo Donati	Released	Summer	Free	
FW	(Scotland)	Darryl Duffy	Released	Summer	Free	
MF	(Scotland)	Nathan Flanagan	Released	Summer	Free	
MF	(Scotland)	Mark Hill	Celtic	Summer	Loan end	
DF	(Scotland)	Gary Irvine	Released	Summer	Free	
MF	(Scotland)	Lewis Morgan	Celtic	Summer	Loan end	
DF	(Scotland)	Liam Smith	Heart of Midlothian	Summer	Loan end	
FW	(England)	John Sutton	Released	Summer	Free	
MF	(Scotland)	Josh Todd	Released	Summer	Free	
DF	(Scotland)	Darren Whyte	Released	Summer	Free	
DF	(England)	Harry Davis	Released	Summer	Free	
FW	(Scotland)	Gavin Reilly	Bristol Rovers	Summer	Free	
GK	(Scotland)	Ross M. Stewart	Livingston	Summer	Free	
FW	(England)	Myles Hippolyte	Dunfermline Athletic	Summer	Free	
FW	(Scotland)	Ross C. Stewart	Ross County	Summer	Undisclosed fee	
MF	(England)	Jim Kellerman	AFC Fylde	Summer	Loan	
FW	(Denmark)	Nicolai Brock-Madsen	Birmingham City	Winter	Loan end	
DF	(England)	Hayden Coulson	Middlesbrough	Winter	Loan end	
GK	(Scotland)	Craig Samson	Sunderland as goalkeeping coach	Winter	Retired	
MF	(England)	Matty Willock	Manchester United	Winter	Loan end	
MF	(Scotland)	Jordan Kirkpatrick	Alloa Athletic	Winter	Free	
MF	(Scotland)	Ian McShane	Falkirk	Winter	Free	
MF	(England)	Adam Hammill	Scunthorpe United	Winter	Free	
DF	(England)	Josh Heaton	Kidderminster Harriers	Winter	Free	
MF	(Australia)	Ryan Edwards	Heart of Midlothian	Winter	Loan end	
DF	(England)	Alfie Jones	Southampton	Winter	Loan end	
GK	(England)	Dean Lyness	Released	Winter	Free	
MF	(England)	Jeff King	Released	Winter	Free	
MF	(Scotland)	Connor O'Keefe	Released	Winter	Free	
DF	(England)	Adam Eckersley	Forfar Athletic	Winter	Loan	
MF	(Scotland)	Cammy Smith	Dundee United	Winter	Undisclosed fee	
DF	(England)	Cole Kpekawa	Released	Winter	Free	

== See also ==
- List of St Mirren F.C. seasons
