= 2019–20 St Mirren F.C. season =

St Mirren
2019–20 season
- Chairman: Gordon Scott
- Manager: Jim Goodwin
- Stadium: St Mirren Park
- Premiership: 9th
- League Cup: Group Stage
- Scottish Cup: Quarter Finals lost to Aberdeen
- Top goalscorer: League: Jonathan Obika (8 goals); All: Jonathan Obika (12 goals)
- Highest home attendance: 7,332 vs Rangers (25 August 2019)
- Lowest home attendance: 4,240 vs Motherwell (4 December 2019)
- Average home league attendance: 5,436
Home colours	Away colours

The 2019–20 season was the club's second consecutive season in the top tier of Scottish football since being promoted from the Scottish Championship at the end of the 2017–18 season. St Mirren also competed in the League Cup and the Scottish Cup.

On 18 May, the season was formally ended after 30 games, due to the COVID-19 Coronavirus outbreak. Saints finished 9th after average points per game played was used to determine final league placings.

== Season review ==
=== May ===
On 28 May, defender Anton Ferdinand confirmed that he would leave Saints when his contract expired in the summer. The experienced defender made 19 appearances in his time at the club. Also on this day, Saints were drawn with Dunfermline Athletic, Albion Rovers, Edinburgh City and East Kilbride in Group H of the Betfred Cup. On 30 May, left back Adam Eckersley joined Scottish League One side Airdrieonians after his contract expired. The defender made a total of 42 appearances for the club, scoring twice. He also played a major role in helping Saints win the 2017–18 Scottish Championship. On 31 May, Jimmy Nicholl left his role as first team coach, to become assistant manager at Dundee.

=== June ===
On 3 June, Saints announced that loanees Anders Dreyer, Brad Lyons, Danny Rogers, Duckens Nazon, Jordan Holmes, Kyle McAllister, Laurențiu Corbu, Lee Hodson and Mihai Popescu had all returned to their parent clubs, and striker Simeon Jackson left the club when his contract expired. On 26 June, following much media speculation, manager Oran Kearney left the club by 'mutual consent', despite having two years of his contract left. Also on this day, defender Gary MacKenzie signed a one-year contract extension with Saints, and goalkeeper Dean Lyness rejoined the club on a two-year deal after leaving in September 2018 to join Raith Rovers. On 28 June, former Saints captain Jim Goodwin was appointed the club's new manager after leaving Alloa Athletic, signing a three-year deal. Another former Saint, Lee Sharp, also joins as Goodwin's assistant.

=== July ===
On 4 July, defender Mateo Mužek left Saints and joined Sheriff Tiraspol of Moldova on a free transfer. Also on this day, striker Tony Andreu signed a one-year deal with the club, after being released by Coventry City. On 12 July, after a successful trial with the club, midfielder Oan Djorkaeff signed a one-year deal. On 19 July, defender Josh Heaton left the club by mutual consent, after only making two appearances since signing a three-year deal at the beginning of last season. On 30 July, Turkish midfielder İlkay Durmuş signed on a two-year deal from Austrian side, Wacker Innsbruck.

=== August ===
On 1 August, midfielder Sam Foley signed on a two-year deal, after being released by Northampton Town. Also on this day, striker Cody Cooke was ruled out for up to nine months, due to ruptured knee ligaments. On 2 August, striker Jonathan Obika joined the club on a two-year deal from Oxford United. Also on this day, defender Sean McLoughlin signed on a six-month loan from Hull City. On 9 August, former Saint Kyle McAllister re-signed for the club on a three-year deal, and defender Calum Waters signed on a one-year loan from Kilmarnock. On 22 August, Jamaican striker Junior Morias signed from Northampton Town on a two-year contract for an undisclosed fee.

=== September ===
On 2 September, defender Jack Baird signed for rivals Greenock Morton on a short-term loan. On 3 September, former Saint Kirk Broadfoot signed a two-year contract with the club, after being released by Kilmarnock.

=== October ===
On 18 October, midfielder Cameron MacPherson signed a two-year contract extension, keeping him at the club until 2022. On 29 October, Jim Kellerman left the club by mutual consent. He joined the club in May 2018 and made seven appearances, scoring once.

=== December ===
On 31 December, on-loan defender Sean McLoughlin returned to parent club Hull City at the end of his loan period. He played 21 times for the club, scoring once.

=== January ===
On 7 January, Saints signed Irish duo Jamie McGrath and Conor McCarthy on two-and-a-half year deals. Midfielder McGrath signed from Dundalk, and defender McCarthy moves from Cork City. Also on this day, defender Jack Baird extended his loan at Greenock Morton until the end of the season. On 8 January, defender Akin Famewo signed on loan until the end of the season from Norwich City. On 24 January, midfielder Kyle Magennis injured his knee during a 1–0 defeat to Rangers, and it was announced that he would miss the rest of the season. On 28 January, 20-year-old Slovak goalkeeper Peter Urminský sign from Spartak Trnava on an 18-month deal. On 30 January, defender Lee Hodson returned to the club for a second spell, after signing on loan until the end of the season from Gillingham. On 31 January, striker Alex Jakubiak joined Saints on loan until the end of the season from Watford, while youngster Ethan Erhahon joined Barnsley on loan and defender Paul McGinn joined Hibernian on an 18-month deal. Also on this day, veteran defender Kirk Broadfoot left the club to rejoin Kilmarnock after leaving them just four months earlier to sign for Saints.

=== February ===
On 1 February, Saints signed forward Seifedin Chabbi on loan until the end of the season from Turkish side Gaziantep. On 7 February, it was announced that Ryan Flynn suffered cruciate ligament damage in a match against Hamilton, which effectively ended his season. On 29 February, the club were knocked out of the Scottish Cup by Aberdeen.

=== March ===
On 13 March, the Scottish football season was suspended until further notice, due to the coronavirus pandemic.

=== May ===
On 18 May, the season was formally ended after 30 games due to the coronavirus pandemic. Saints finished 9th, after average points per game played was used to determine final league placings.

== Squad list ==
As of 11 March 2020

No.	Name	Nationality	Position	Date of birth (age)	Signed from	Signed in	Signed until	Apps.	Goals
Goalkeepers
1	Václav Hladký	(Czech Republic)	GK	14 November 1990 (age 35)	Slovan Liberec	2019	2020	59	0
26	Dean Lyness	(England)	GK	20 July 1991 (age 34)	Raith Rovers	2019	2021	4	0
–	Peter Urminský	(Slovakia)	GK	24 May 1999 (age 26)	Spartak Trnava	2020	2021	0	0
Defenders
2	Lee Hodson	(Northern Ireland)	DF	2 October 1991 (age 34)	Gillingham (loan)	2020	2020	33	0
3	Calum Waters	(Scotland)	DF	10 March 1996 (age 29)	Kilmarnock (loan)	2019	2020	31	0
5	Conor McCarthy	(Republic of Ireland)	DF	11 April 1998 (age 27)	Cork City	2020	2022	13	1
6	Gary MacKenzie	(Scotland)	DF	15 October 1985 (age 40)	Doncaster Rovers	2016	2020	74	6
22	Akin Famewo	(England)	DF	9 November 1998 (age 27)	Norwich City (loan)	2020	2020	13	0
Midfielders
4	Stephen McGinn (c)	(Scotland)	MF	2 December 1988 (age 37)	Wycombe Wanderers	2017	2020	202	15
7	Kyle Magennis	(Scotland)	MF	26 August 1998 (age 27)	St Mirren youth team	2016	2021	107	8
8	Ryan Flynn	(Scotland)	MF	4 September 1988 (age 37)	Oldham Athletic	2018	2020	74	2
11	İlkay Durmuş	(Turkey)	MF	1 May 1994 (age 31)	Wacker Innsbruck	2019	2021	32	4
14	Kyle McAllister	(Scotland)	MF	26 May 1997 (age 28)	Derby County	2019	2022	54	4
16	Sam Foley	(Republic of Ireland)	MF	17 October 1986 (age 39)	Northampton Town	2019	2021	31	2
17	Jamie McGrath	(Republic of Ireland)	MF	30 September 1996 (age 29)	Dundalk	2020	2022	11	0
23	Oan Djorkaeff	(France)	MF	30 April 1997 (age 28)	Nantes B	2019	2020	6	1
28	Cameron MacPherson	(Scotland)	MF	29 December 1998 (age 27)	St Mirren youth team	2015	2022	47	3
29	Ross Wallace	(Scotland)	MF	23 May 1985 (age 40)	Fleetwood Town	2020	2020	3	0
Forwards
9	Jonathan Obika	(England)	FW	12 September 1990 (age 35)	Oxford United	2019	2021	34	12
10	Tony Andreu	(France)	FW	22 May 1988 (age 37)	Coventry City	2019	2020	36	2
18	Danny Mullen	(Scotland)	FW	1 March 1995 (age 31)	Livingston	2017	2020	72	14
19	Junior Morias	(Jamaica)	FW	4 July 1995 (age 30)	Northampton Town	2019	2021	29	2
20	Cody Cooke	(England)	FW	2 March 1993 (age 33)	Truro City	2018	2020	27	5
21	Seifedin Chabbi	(Tunisia)	FW	4 July 1993 (age 32)	Gaziantep (loan)	2020	2020	3	0
28	Alex Jakubiak	(Scotland)	FW	27 August 1996 (age 29)	Watford (loan)	2020	2020	10	1

== Results & fixtures ==
Win Draw Loss Postponed

=== Pre season / Friendlies ===
29 June 2019 Friendly	Coleraine	Cancelled	St Mirren	The Showgrounds
14:00

6 July 2019 Friendly	Peterborough United	2–0	St Mirren	La Manga Club, Spain
19:00	Toney 4'; Eisa 36'	Peterborough FC Report

9 July 2019 Friendly	Stenhousemuir	1–1	St Mirren	Ochilview Park
19:30	Trialist 78'		Andreu 66'

=== Scottish Premiership ===
3 August 2019 1	Hibernian	1–0	St Mirren	Easter Road
15:00	Allan 85'	BBC Sport		Attendance: 16,631; Referee: Euan Anderson

11 August 2019 2	St Mirren	1–0	Aberdeen	St Mirren Park
15:00	Durmuş 13'	BBC Report		Attendance: 6,199; Referee: Steven McLean

25 August 2019 3	St Mirren	0–1	Rangers	St Mirren Park
12:15		BBC Report	Barišić 59'	Attendance: 7,332; Referee: Kevin Clancy

31 August 2019 4	Livingston	2–1	St Mirren	Almondvale Stadium
15:00	Lithgow 26'; Dykes 58'	BBC Report	Magennis 64'	Attendance: 2,346; Referee: Colin Steven

14 September 2019 5	Ross County	2–1	St Mirren	Global Energy Stadium
15:00	Stewart 62'; Fraser 90+2'	BBC Report	Andreu 72'	Attendance: 3,637; Referee: Colin Steven

21 September 2019 6	St Mirren	0–0	Hamilton Academical	St Mirren Park
15:00		BBC Report		Attendance: 4,807; Referee: David Munro

28 September 2019 7	St Mirren	0–0	Heart of Midlothian	St Mirren Park
15:00		BBC Report		Attendance: 5,901; Referee: Andrew Dallas

5 October 2019 8	Motherwell	2–0	St Mirren	Fir Park
15:00	Scott 39'; Long 86'	BBC Report		Attendance: 5,101; Referee: John Beaton

19 October 2019 9	St Mirren	2–0	St Johnstone	St Mirren Park
15:00	Obika 37'; Mullen 61'	BBC Report		Attendance: 4,791; Referee: Nick Walsh

26 October 2019 10	Kilmarnock	1–0	St Mirren	Rugby Park
15:00	Dicker 78'	BBC Report		Attendance: 6,389; Referee: William Collum

30 October 2019 11	Celtic	2–0	St Mirren	Celtic Park
	Elyounoussi 49'; Forrest 54'	BBC Report		Attendance: 56,127; Referee: Kevin Clancy

9 November 2019 12	Heart of Midlothian	5–2	St Mirren	Tynecastle Park
15:00	Naismith 6'; McLoughlin 30' (o.g.); Bozanic 42'; Walker 46'; Mulraney 77'	BBC Report	Obika 21'; Mullen 33'	Attendance: 16,165; Referee: Euan Anderson

23 November 2019 13	St Mirren	2–1	Ross County	St Mirren Park
15:00	McLoughlin 43'; Foley 88'	BBC Report	Graham 24'	Attendance: 4,708; Referee: Euan Anderson

26 November 2019 14	St Mirren	1–2	Hibernian	St Mirren Park
15:00	Morias 90+1'	BBC Sport	Doidge 28'; Mallan 82' (pen.)	Attendance: 5,377; Referee: Alan Newlands

30 November 2019 15	Aberdeen	2–1	St Mirren	Pittodrie Stadium
15:00	Cosgrove 6'; McGinn 56'	BBC Report	Obika 23'	Attendance: 12,829; Referee: Steven McLean

4 December 2019 16	St Mirren	0–3	Motherwell	St Mirren Park
19:45		BBC Report	Scott 28', 33'; Campbell 67'	Attendance: 4,240; Referee: Andrew Dallas

7 December 2019 17	Hamilton Academical	0–1	St Mirren	New Douglas Park
15:00		BBC Report	MacPherson 52'	Attendance: 1,962; Referee: Don Robertson

14 December 2019 18	St Mirren	3–3	Livingston	St Mirren Park
15:00	Morias 33'; Obika 61', 73'	BBC Report	Souda 13', 56'; Guthrie 45'	Attendance: 4,344; Referee: Nick Walsh

21 December 2019 19	St Johnstone	0–0	St Mirren	McDiarmid Park
15:00		BBC Report		Attendance: 3,318; Referee: John Beaton

26 December 2019 20	St Mirren	1–2	Celtic	St Mirren Park
15:00	MacPherson 89'	BBC Report	McGregor 22'; Forrest 32'	Attendance: 6,797; Referee: Willie Collum

29 December 2019 21	St Mirren	1–0	Kilmarnock	St Mirren Park
15:00	Durmuş 17'	BBC Report		Attendance: 6,363; Referee: Alan Newlands

22 January 2020 22	Rangers	1–0	St Mirren	Ibrox Stadium
19:45	Defoe 34'	BBC Report		Attendance: 49,297; Referee: Nick Walsh

26 January 2020 23	St Mirren	0–0	Aberdeen	St Mirren Park
12:30		BBC Report		Attendance: 5,302; Referee: Don Robertson

1 February 2020 24	Hibernian	2–2	St Mirren	Easter Road
15:00	Allan 25'; Doidge 43'	BBC Sport	McCarthy 14'; Andreu 18'	Attendance: 16,325; Referee: David Munro

5 February 2020 25	St Mirren	1–1	Hamilton Academical	St Mirren Park
19:45	Durmuş 73'	BBC Report	Templeton 25'	Attendance: 4,537; Referee: Alan Newlands

12 February 2020 26	Livingston	2–1	St Mirren	Almondvale Stadium
19:45	Lawless 34' (pen.); Dykes 46'	BBC Report	Obika 50'	Attendance: 1,263; Referee: David Munro

21 February 2020	St Mirren	P – P	Heart of Midlothian	St Mirren Park
19:45

25 February 2020 27	Motherwell	1–2	St Mirren	Fir Park
19:45	Donnelly 12' (pen.)	BBC Report	Obika 50'; Durmuş 87'	Attendance: 3,636

4 March 2020 28	St Mirren	0–0	St Johnstone	St Mirren Park
19:45		BBC Report		Attendance: 4,287; Referee: Euan Anderson

7 March 2020 29	Celtic	5–0	St Mirren	Celtic Park
15:00	Griffiths 18', 44', 74'; Édouard 54'; McGregor 90' (pen.)	BBC Report		Attendance: 58,998; Referee: Gavin Duncan

11 March 2020 30	St Mirren	1–0	Heart of Midlothian	St Mirren Park
19:45	Obika 48'	BBC Report		Attendance: 5,662; Referee: Alan Muir

14 March 2020	Kilmarnock	Cancelled	St Mirren	Rugby Park
15:00

=== Scottish League Cup ===
14 July 2019 Group H	St Mirren	2–3	Dunfermline Athletic	St Mirren Park
15:00	Cooke 63'; Mullen 65'	BBC report	Dow 18'; Ryan 24'; Beadling 40'	Attendance: 2,067; Referee: Steven McLean

17 July 2019 Group H	St Mirren	1–0	Edinburgh City	St Mirren Park
19:45	Djorkaeff 88' (pen.)	BBC Report		Attendance: 1,235; Referee: Greg Aitken

20 July 2019 Group H	East Kilbride	0–0 (6–5 p)	St Mirren	K-Park Training Academy
15:00		BBC Report		Attendance: 644; Referee: Colin Steven
	Penalties
	Carmichael (penalty scored); Sinnamon (penalty missed); Reid (penalty scored); Kavanagh (penalty scored); Coll (penalty scored); Cairns (penalty scored); Brownlie (penalty scored)		(penalty scored) P. McGinn; (penalty scored) Andreu; (penalty scored) Flynn; (penalty scored) MacPherson; (penalty missed) Mullen; (penalty scored) Djorkaeff; (penalty missed) Cooke

23 July 2019 Group H	Albion Rovers	0–0 (3–4 p)	St Mirren	Cliftonhill
19:45		BBC Report		Attendance: 512; Referee: Barry Cook
	Penalties
	Phillips (penalty scored); Fotheringham (penalty scored); Wharton (penalty missed); East (penalty scored); Osadolor (penalty missed)		(penalty scored) P. McGinn; (penalty scored) Andreu; (penalty scored) Flynn; (penalty scored) Magennis

=== Scottish Cup ===
18 January 2020 Fourth Round	St Mirren	3–0	Broxburn Athletic	St Mirren Park
15:00	Obika 55', 90+1'; Mullen 89'	BBC Report		Attendance: 4,327; Referee: David Munro

8 February 2020 Fifth Round	St Mirren	1–1	Motherwell	St Mirren Park
15:00	Jakubiak 74'	BBC Report	O'Hara 21'	Attendance: 4,323; Referee: Andrew Dallas

18 February 2020 Fifth Round Replay	Motherwell	4–4 (2–3 p)	St Mirren	Fir Park
19:45	Polworth 27'; Watt 57'; Aarons 73'; Campbell 74'	BBC Report	Obika 14', 31'; Hartley 33' (o.g.); Foley 43'	Attendance: 4,534; Referee: Gavin Duncan
	Penalties
	Donnelly (penalty missed); Watt (penalty missed); Aarons (penalty scored); Polworth (penalty scored); Hylton (penalty missed)		(penalty scored) McGrath; (penalty missed) Andreu; (penalty missed) MacPherson; (penalty scored) McAllister; (penalty scored) Obika

29 February 2020 Quarter Finals	St Mirren	0–2	Aberdeen	St Mirren Park
19:20		BBC Report	Ferguson 7'; Cosgrove 90' (pen.)	Attendance: 4,479

== Player statistics ==
=== Appearances and goals ===
As of 11 March 2020

No.	Pos	Player	Premiership		League Cup		Scottish Cup		Total	
No.	Pos	Player	Apps	Goals	Apps	Goals	Apps	Goals	Apps	Goals
1	GK	(Czech Republic) Václav Hladký	30	0	4	0	4	0	38	0
2	DF	(Northern Ireland) Lee Hodson	5+2	0	0	0	3	0	10	0
3	DF	(Scotland) Calum Waters	27	0	0	0	4	0	31	0
4	MF	(Scotland) Stephen McGinn	7+2	0	3	0	0	0	12	0
5	DF	(Republic of Ireland) Conor McCarthy	9	1	0	0	4	0	13	1
6	DF	(Scotland) Gary MacKenzie	9+1	0	2	0	0	0	12	0
7	MF	(Scotland) Kyle Magennis	22	1	4	0	1	0	27	1
8	MF	(Scotland) Ryan Flynn	22	0	4	0	1	0	27	0
9	FW	(England) Jonathan Obika	26+4	8	0	0	4	4	34	12
10	FW	(France) Tony Andreu	16+12	2	4	0	0+4	0	36	2
11	MF	(Turkey) İlkay Durmuş	21+7	4	0	0	4	0	32	4
14	MF	(Scotland) Kyle McAllister	3+12	0	0	0	0+3	0	18	0
16	MF	(Republic of Ireland) Sam Foley	27	1	0	0	4	1	31	2
17	MF	(Republic of Ireland) Jamie McGrath	4+3	0	0	0	3+1	0	11	0
18	FW	(Scotland) Danny Mullen	7+10	2	3+1	1	0+1	1	22	4
19	FW	(Jamaica) Junior Morias	14+12	2	0	0	1+2	0	29	2
20	FW	(England) Cody Cooke	0+6	0	3+1	1	0	0	10	1
21	FW	(Tunisia) Seifedin Chabbi	0+2	0	0	0	0+1	0	3	0
22	DF	(England) Akin Famewo	9	0	0	0	4	0	13	0
23	MF	(France) Oan Djorkaeff	0+2	0	3+1	1	0	0	6	1
24	MF	(Scotland) Cameron MacPherson	15+1	2	3	0	4	0	23	2
26	GK	(England) Dean Lyness	0	0	0	0	0	0	0	0
28	FW	(Scotland) Alex Jakubiak	4+3	0	0	0	3	1	10	1
29	MF	(Scotland) Ross Wallace	2+1	0	0	0	0	0	3	0
38	FW	(Scotland) Cameron Breadner	0+2	0	0+2	0	0	0	4	0
48	DF	(Scotland) Scott Glover	1	0	0	0	0	0	1	0
–	GK	(Slovakia) Peter Urminský	0	0	0	0	0	0	0	0
Players who left the club during the season:
2	DF	(Scotland) Paul McGinn (joined Hibernian)	21+1	0	4	0	0	0	26	0
5	DF	(Republic of Ireland) Sean McLoughlin (loan return to Hull City)	21	1	0	0	0	0	21	1
15	DF	(Scotland) Jack Baird (on loan to Greenock Morton)	0	0	4	0	0	0	4	0
17	MF	(England) Jim Kellerman (released)	0	0	0+1	0	0	0	1	0
21	DF	(Scotland) Kirk Broadfoot (joined Kilmarnock)	7+1	0	0	0	0	0	8	0
22	MF	(England) Greg Tansey (released)	0	0	0	0	0	0	0	0
25	MF	(Scotland) Ethan Erhahon (on loan to Barnsley)	0	0	3+1	0	0	0	4	0
46	DF	(Scotland) Nick McAllister (on loan to Albion Rovers)	0	0	0+1	0	0	0	1	0

=== Goal scorers ===
As of match played 11 March 2020

Place	Position	Nation	Name	Total	Scottish Premiership	Scottish Cup	Scottish League Cup
1	FW	(England)	Jonathan Obika	12	8	4	
2	FW	(Scotland)	Danny Mullen	4	2	1	1
2	MF	(Turkey)	İlkay Durmuş	4	4		
4	MF	(France)	Tony Andreu	2	2		
4	MF	(Republic of Ireland)	Sam Foley	2	1	1	
4	MF	(Scotland)	Cameron MacPherson	2	2		
4	FW	(Jamaica)	Junior Morias	2	2		
8	FW	(England)	Cody Cooke	1			1
8	MF	(France)	Oan Djorkaeff	1			1
8	FW	(Scotland)	Alex Jakubiak	1		1	
8	MF	(Scotland)	Kyle Magennis	1	1		
8	DF	(Republic of Ireland)	Conor McCarthy	1	1		
8	DF	(Republic of Ireland)	Sean McLoughlin	1	1		
—			Own goal	1		1	
Total				35	24	8	3

=== Disciplinary record ===
Includes all competitive matches.

Last updated 11 March 2020

Number	Nation	Position	Name	Total		Scottish Premiership		League Cup		Scottish Cup	
Number	Nation	Position	Name	Booked	Sent off (straight red)	Booked	Sent off (straight red)	Booked	Sent off (straight red)	Booked	Sent off (straight red)
8	(Scotland)	MF	Ryan Flynn	6	0	5		1			
16	(Republic of Ireland)	MF	Sam Foley	6	0	6					
3	(Scotland)	DF	Calum Waters	5	0	5					
2	(Scotland)	DF	Paul McGinn	4	0	4					
7	(Scotland)	MF	Kyle Magennis	4	0	4					
14	(Scotland)	MF	Kyle McAllister	3	0	3					
17	(Republic of Ireland)	MF	Jamie McGrath	3	0	2				1	
24	(Scotland)	MF	Cameron MacPherson	3	0	2				1	
1	(Czech Republic)	GK	Václav Hladký	2	0	1		1			
5	(Republic of Ireland)	DF	Conor McCarthy	2	0	1				1	
10	(France)	FW	Tony Andreu	2	0	2					
11	(Turkey)	MF	İlkay Durmuş	2	0	1				1	
18	(Scotland)	FW	Danny Mullen	2	0	2					
19	(Jamaica)	FW	Junior Morias	2	0	2					
22	(England)	FW	Akin Famewo	2	0	1				1	
5	(Republic of Ireland)	DF	Sean McLoughlin	1	0	1					
6	(Scotland)	DF	Gary MacKenzie	1	0	1					
9	(England)	FW	Jonathan Obika	1	0	1					
15	(Scotland)	DF	Jack Baird	1	0			1			
20	(England)	FW	Cody Cooke	1	0			1			
29	(Scotland)	MF	Ross Wallace	1	0	1					
46	(Scotland)	DF	Nick McAllister	1	0			1			

== Team statistics ==
=== League table ===
Pos	Team	Pld	W	D	L	GF	GA	GD	Pts	PPG	Qualification or relegation (Note: All play-off matches were cancelled, as clubs voted to curtail the season due to the COVID-19 pandemic.)
7	Hibernian	30	9	10	11	42	49	−7	37	1.23	
8	Kilmarnock	30	9	6	15	31	41	−10	33	1.10	
9	St Mirren	30	7	8	15	24	41	−17	29	0.97	
10	Ross County	30	7	8	15	29	60	−31	29	0.97	
11	Hamilton Academical	30	6	9	15	30	50	−20	27	0.90	

Source: BBC SPFL
Rules for classification: 1) Points per game; 2) Goal difference; 3) Goals scored; 4) Head-to-head points; 5) Head-to-Head goal difference; 6) Play-off (only if deciding champion, UEFA competitions qualification, second stage group allocation or relegation).

=== Division summary ===
Round	1	2	3	4	5	6	7	8	9	10	11	12	13	14	15	16	17	18	19	20	21	22	23	24	25	26	27	28	29	30
Ground	A	H	H	A	A	H	H	A	H	A	A	A	H	H	A	H	A	H	A	H	H	A	H	A	H	A	A	H	A	H
Result	L	W	L	L	L	D	D	L	W	L	L	L	W	L	L	L	W	D	D	L	W	L	D	D	D	L	W	D	L	W
Position	10	5	8	10	10	9	10	11	9	10	12	12	10	10	11	12	9	9	9	10	10	10	10	10	10	10	10	10	11	9

Updated to match(es) played on 11 March 2020. Source:
A = Away; H = Home; W = Win; D = Draw; L = Loss

=== League results by opponent ===
Team	Result				Points
Team	Home		Away		Points
Aberdeen	1–0	0–0	1–2	–	4/9
Celtic	1–2	–	0–2	0–5	0/9
Hamilton Academicals	0–0	1–1	1–0	–	5/9
Heart of Midlothian	0–0	1–0	2–5	–	4/9
Hibernian	1–2	–	0–1	2–2	1/9
Kilmarnock	1–0	–	0–1	–	3/6
Livingston	3–3	–	1–2	1–2	1/9
Motherwell	0–3	–	0–2	2–1	3/9
Rangers	0–1	–	0–1	–	0/6
Ross County	2–1	–	1–2	–	3/6
St Johnstone	2–0	0–0	0–0	–	5/9

=== Management statistics ===
Last updated on 11 March 2020

Name	From	To	P	W	D	L	Win% (Note: Win% is the percentage of matches won rounded to two decimal places.)
Jim Goodwin	28 June 2019	Present	38	9	12	17	23.68

== Transfers ==
=== Players in ===
Position	Nationality	Name	From	Transfer Window	Ends	Fee	Source
GK	(England)	Dean Lyness	Raith Rovers	Summer	2021	Free	
FW	(France)	Tony Andreu	Coventry City	Summer	2020	Free	
MF	(France)	Oan Djorkaeff	Nantes B	Summer	2020	Free	
MF	(Turkey)	İlkay Durmuş	Wacker Innsbruck	Summer	2021	Free	
MF	(Republic of Ireland)	Sam Foley	Northampton Town	Summer	2021	Free	
FW	(England)	Jonathan Obika	Oxford United	Summer	2021	Free	
DF	(Republic of Ireland)	Sean McLoughlin	Hull City	Summer	2021	Loan	
DF	(Scotland)	Calum Waters	Kilmarnock	Summer	2020	Loan	
MF	(Scotland)	Kyle McAllister	Derby County	Summer	2022	Free	
FW	(Jamaica)	Junior Morias	Northampton Town	Summer	2021	Undisclosed fee	
DF	(Scotland)	Kirk Broadfoot	Kilmarnock	Summer	2021	Free	
DF	(Republic of Ireland)	Conor McCarthy	Cork City	Winter	2022	Undisclosed fee	
MF	(Republic of Ireland)	Jamie McGrath	Dundalk	Winter	2022	Free	
DF	(England)	Akin Famewo	Norwich City	Winter	2020	Loan	
GK	(Slovakia)	Peter Urminský	Spartak Trnava	Winter	2021	Free	
DF	(Northern Ireland)	Lee Hodson	Gillingham	Winter	2020	Loan	
FW	(Scotland)	Alex Jakubiak	Watford	Winter	2020	Loan	
FW	(Tunisia)	Seifedin Chabbi	Gaziantep	Winter	2020	Loan	

=== Players out ===
Position	Nationality	Name	To / Type	Transfer Window	Fee	Source
DF	(England)	Anton Ferdinand	Released	Summer	Free	
DF	(England)	Adam Eckersley	Airdrieonians	Summer	Free	
MF	(Denmark)	Anders Dreyer	Brighton & Hove Albion	Summer	End of loan	
MF	(Northern Ireland)	Brad Lyons	Blackburn Rovers	Summer	End of loan	
GK	(Republic of Ireland)	Danny Rogers	Aberdeen	Summer	End of loan	
FW	(Haiti)	Duckens Nazon	Sint-Truidense	Summer	End of loan	
GK	(Australia)	Jordan Holmes	Bournemouth	Summer	End of loan	
MF	(Scotland)	Kyle McAllister	Derby County	Summer	End of loan	
DF	(Romania)	Laurențiu Corbu	Dinamo Bucharest	Summer	End of loan	
DF	(Northern Ireland)	Lee Hodson	Rangers	Summer	End of loan	
DF	(Romania)	Mihai Popescu	Dinamo Bucharest	Summer	End of loan	
FW	(Canada)	Simeon Jackson	Released	Summer	Free	
DF	(Croatia)	Mateo Mužek	Sheriff Tiraspol	Summer	Free	
DF	(England)	Josh Heaton	Released	Summer	Free	
MF	(England)	Greg Tansey	Released	Summer	Free	
DF	(Scotland)	Jack Baird	Greenock Morton	Summer	Loan	
MF	(England)	Jim Kellerman	Released	Summer	Free	
DF	(Republic of Ireland)	Sean McLoughlin	Hull City	Winter	End of loan	
DF	(Scotland)	Ethan Erhahon	Barnsley	Winter	Loan	
DF	(Scotland)	Paul McGinn	Hibernian	Winter	Undisclosed fee	
DF	(Scotland)	Kirk Broadfoot	Kilmarnock	Winter	Free	

== See also ==
- List of St Mirren F.C. seasons
