= Sam Jamieson =

Sam Jamieson is the name of:

- Sam Jamieson (footballer), Scottish footballer
- Sam Jamieson (sprinter), Australian sprinter
