= Johnstone Burgh F.C. =

Association football club in Scotland

Johnstone Burgh
- Full name: Johnstone Burgh Football Club
- Nickname: The Burgh
- Founded: 1956
- Ground: James Y. Keanie Park, Johnstone
- Capacity: 3200
- Coordinates: 55.8304°N 4.4989°W
- Manager: Stephen Farrell
- League: Lowland League West
- 2025–26: West of Scotland League Premier Division, 6th of 16 (promoted)
- Website: https://www.johnstoneburghfc.com/
Home colours	Away colours

Johnstone Burgh Football Club is a Scottish football club based in Johnstone, Renfrewshire, and play in Lowland League West.

== History ==
The club was formed in 1956, in response to an article in the "Johnstone & Linwood Gazette" newspaper from a journalist that had been ordered out of the newspaper's office on the corner of Johnstone's Rankine Street by the office manager with instructions not to return until he had a story. The journalist proceeded to ask locals what they thought about forming a new football club to replace the former Scottish league side Johnstone F.C.

Their most successful period was in the late 1950s and 1960s when they twice won junior football's top prize – the Scottish Junior Cup. Probably their most successful manager was Jimmy Blackburn who led them to both their Scottish Cup wins as well as West of Scotland Cup and Central League Championship wins. One of our local lads, Bobby Dick, who hails from Elderslie, played what was then right half for the Burgh, and can boast two Scottish Cup winner's medals as well as a number of other medals. In those days the cup final was played at Hampden Park, which made it a day to remember. In later years, Bobby's nephew Alan Donohoe played in goal for the Burgh and was involved in their cup final of 2000.

The 1967–68 season was Johnstone Burgh's most successful season: they won the Scottish Junior Cup, beating Glenrothes 2–1 in extra time after a 2–2 draw at Hampden in the first match. Hugh Gilshan scored the winner. The team also won the Central League Championship and the Evening Times Trophy that season.

Johnstone Burgh has a home support of around 100–150, though this tends to increase vastly when the team is doing well. An OVD Cup tie between Johnstone Burgh and Glenafton Athletic in February 2000 attracted a crowd of over 2000.

In the 2000 Scottish Junior Cup Final against Whitburn, goals by Colin Lindsay, who later had a spell as manager, and John McLay took the game to penalties after a 2–2 draw. Johnstone Burgh won on penalties in their semi-final at Love Street, but failed to repeat this success in the final.

== Ground ==
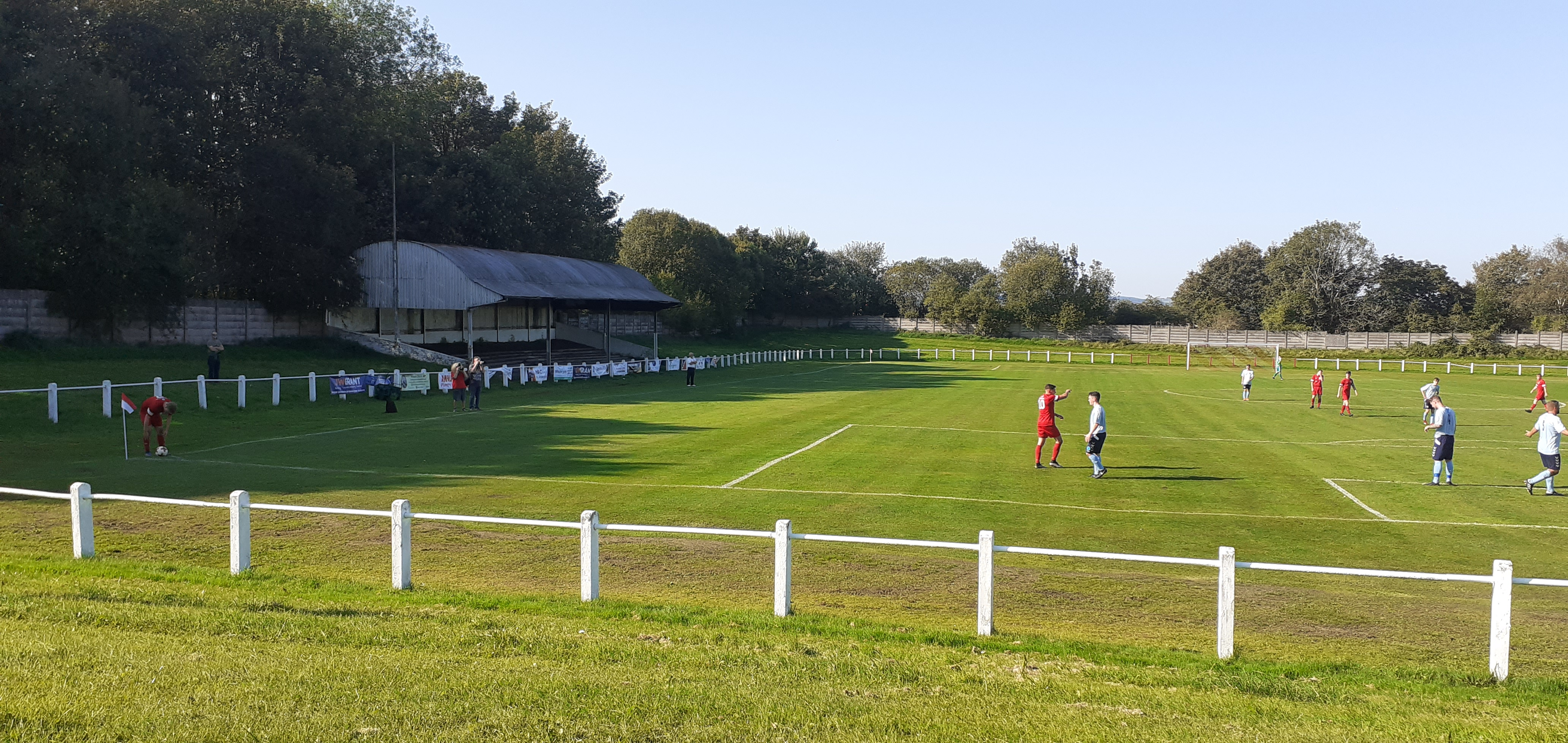
Johnstone Burgh's ground Keanie Park

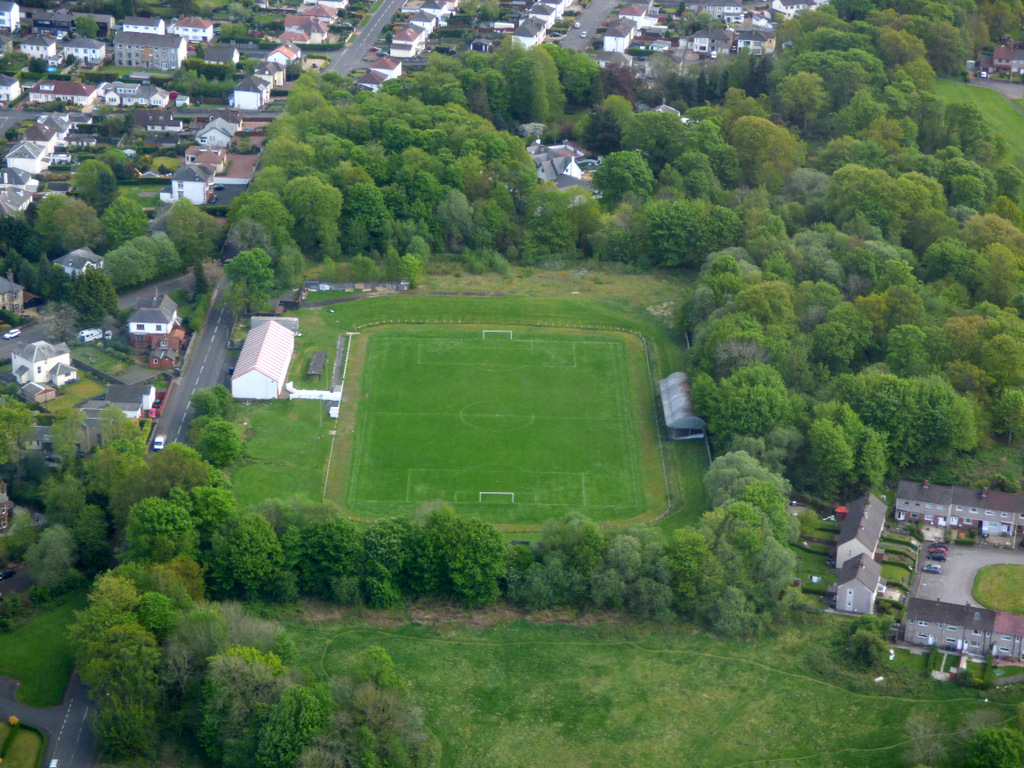
Keanie Park, aerial photo, May 2019

Since their foundation, "The Burgh," has been based at James Y. Keanie Park (named after the builder who donated the land the club was built upon). According to "The Juniors, 100 Years A Centenary History of Scottish Football" (McGlone/ McLure) the record attendance was 13,000 v Greenock in the 1963/64 Scottish Junior Cup.

In 2014 Johnstone Burgh shared James Y. Keanie Park with Renfrewshire neighbours Renfrew until October 2014 as their New Western Park ground was not yet completed for the start of the 2014–15 season.

== Current squad ==
As of 10 June 2026

Note: Flags indicate national team as defined under FIFA eligibility rules; some limited exceptions apply. Players may hold more than one non-FIFA nationality.

No.	Pos.	Nation	Player
—	GK	SCO	Luke Scullion
—	GK	NIR	Brett Long
—	DF	SCO	Cameron Eadie
—	DF	SCO	Kian Gilday
—	DF	SCO	Lewis King
—	DF	SCO	Ross MacKinnon
—	DF	SCO	Mark Durnan
—	DF	SCO	Scott Williamson
—	DF	SCO	Mark Barrowman
—	DF	SCO	Adam Livingstone (on loan from Forfar Athletic)
—	MF	SCO	Malky McDonald
—	MF	SCO	Derek Esplin

No.	Pos.	Nation	Player
—	MF	SCO	Max Kerr
—	MF	SCO	Aaron Mason
—	MF	SCO	Calvin McGrory
—	MF	SCO	Stuart Faulds
—	MF	SCO	Leon Murphy
—	MF	SCO	Broque Watson
—	MF	SCO	Ian McShane
—	MF	SCO	Kristopher Kerr
—	MF	SCO	Zak McKay
—	MF	SCO	Noah Grady
—	MF	SCO	Ben Brown
—	FW	SCO	Thomas Orr
—	FW	SCO	Sam Jamieson

=== On loan ===
Note: Flags indicate national team as defined under FIFA eligibility rules; some limited exceptions apply. Players may hold more than one non-FIFA nationality.

No.	Pos.	Nation	Player
—	DF	SCO	Aiden O'Neil (on loan at Ashfield)
—	MF	SCO	Nicholas Gallagher (on loan at Thorniewood United)

== Notable players ==
After the 1968–1969 season, the most successful in the club's history, Ian Reid signed for Arbroath, Hugh Gilshan for St Mirren, Danny Burke to East Fife and Jim McDonald to Leicester City. The following year, Ally Hunter signed for Kilmarnock after replacing George Connolly in goal at Keanie Park the season before. He went on to play for the full Scotland team. One of the two ball boys from the 1968–69 season, Allan Woods, signed a professional contract with Partick Thistle at just 16 yrs old, under Dave McParland and returned to Johnstone Burgh after three years at Firhill.

- (Scotland) Tommy Turner: Former St Johnstone, Partick Thistle, Morton and St Mirren midfielder.
- Malcolm Manley: Former Scotland Schools International; professional with Leicester City and Portsmouth.
- Allan Woods: Former Scotland Schools international; Partick Thistle midfielder.
- Frank McAvennie: Former St Mirren, West Ham United, Celtic and Scotland striker.
- (Scotland) Andy Murdoch: Former Partick Thistle goalkeeper.
- (Scotland) Gerry Queen: Professional with St Mirren, Kilmarnock, Crystal Palace (English first division 1969–72) and Leyton Orient.
- Graham Dorrans: Professional with West Brom, Norwich City, Rangers, Dundee, Dunfermline Ath. Scotland
- Kyle Lafferty: Internationally capped professional (85 caps) with Rangers, Hearts, Kilmarnock and Northern Ireland.

== Honours ==
=== Leagues ===
Central Junior Premier Division

- Winners: 1958–59, 1964–65, 1967–68, 2001-02

Central Junior Division Two

- Winners: 1991–92, 2009–10,

West Region League Two

- Winners: 2019–20

=== Cups ===
Scottish Junior Cup

- Winners: 1963–64, 1967–68, 2024–25
- Runners-up: 1999–00

West of Scotland Junior Cup

- Winners: 1958–59, 1964–65
- Runners-up: 2001-02

Evening Times Cup Winners Cup

- Winners: 1968-69, 2001–02

=== Other honours ===
Renfrewshire Junior Cup

- Winners: 1957-58, 1958-59, 1961-62

Renfrewshire-Dunbartonshire Junior Cup

- Winners: 1960-1961

Erskine Hospital Charity Cup

- Winners: 1959-60, 1963-64, 1965-66, 1967-68, 1973-74, 1991-92

Glasgow Dryburgh Cup

- Winners: 1958–59
