= Mănești =

Măneşti may refer to several places in Romania:

- Mănești, Dâmbovița, a commune in Dâmboviţa County
- Măneşti, Prahova, a commune in Prahova County
- Măneşti, a village in Cuca Commune, Argeș County
