= Cammy MacPherson =

Scottish footballer

Personal information
- Full name: Cameron MacPherson
- Date of birth: 29 December 1998 (age 27)
- Place of birth: Glasgow, Scotland
- Positions: Midfielder; defender

Team information
- Current team: Livingston
- Number: 15

Youth career
- St Mirren

Senior career*
Years	Team	Apps	(Gls)
2017–2022	St Mirren	61	(4)
2017–2018	→ Stranraer (loan)	9	(1)
2021–2022	→ St Johnstone (loan)	10	(0)
2022–2025	St Johnstone	54	(0)
2025	→ Tampa Bay Rowdies (loan)	6	(0)
2025–2026	Greenock Morton	21	(3)
2026–	Livingston	2	(0)
- * Club domestic league appearances and goals as of 4 May 2026

Cameron MacPherson (born 29 December 1998) is a Scottish professional footballer who plays for Livingston as a midfielder.

== Career ==
MacPherson started out in the youth system of St Mirren, prior to appearing for the first-team. He made his career debut on 21 January 2017 during a Scottish Cup fixture with Dundee, while his Championship bow arrived ten months later against Falkirk on 21 October. In total, MacPherson featured six times for St Mirren throughout 2017–18. On 30 January 2018, Stranraer of League One loaned MacPherson. One goal, versus Arbroath on 20 February, in nine matches followed as the club finished 5th. He returned to his parent club in August 2018, before netting his first goal for them in December against Aberdeen at St Mirren Park.

In October 2019, MacPherson signed a two-year contract extension with St Mirren, keeping him at the club until 2022.

MacPherson moved on loan to St Johnstone in August 2021. After MacPherson signed a pre-contract agreement with St Johnstone in January 2022, his parent club St Mirren recalled him in order to negotiate terms for selling him to St Johnstone on a permanent deal. MacPherson joined St Johnstone permanently for an undisclosed fee on 24 January.

He also went on loan to Tampa Bay Rowdies where he made 8 appearances before getting another injury to end his time in USA

MacPherson signed for Livingston in July 2026.

== Career statistics ==
As of 10 April 2021

Appearances and goals by club, season and competition
Club	Season	League			Cup (Note: Includes the Scottish Cup)		League Cup (Note: Includes the Scottish League Cup)		Continental		Other		Total	
Club	Season	Division	Apps	Goals	Apps	Goals	Apps	Goals	Apps	Goals	Apps	Goals	Apps	Goals
St Mirren	2016–17	Scottish Championship	0	0	1	0	0	0	—		0	0	1	0
St Mirren	2017–18	Scottish Championship	4	0	1	0	0	0	—		1	0	6	0
St Mirren	2018–19	Scottish Premiership	13	1	1	0	3	0	—		0	0	17	1
St Mirren	2019–20	Scottish Premiership	16	2	4	0	3	0	—		0	0	23	2
St Mirren	2020–21	Scottish Premiership	28	1	0	0	6	0	—		0	0	34	1
St Mirren	Total		61	4	7	0	12	0	—		1	0	81	4
Stranraer (loan)	2017–18	Scottish League One	9	1	0	0	0	0	—		0	0	9	1
St Mirren U21	2018–19	—			—		—		—		2 (Note: Appearances in 2018–19 Scottish Challenge Cup)	2 (Note: Goals in 2018–19 Scottish Challenge Cup)	2	2
St Mirren U21	2019–20	—			—		—		—		2 (Note: Appearances in 2019–20 Scottish Challenge Cup)	1 (Note: Goals in 2019–20 Scottish Challenge Cup)	2	1
Career total			70	5	7	0	12	0	—		5	3	94	8

== Honours ==
St Mirren

- Scottish Championship: 2017–18
