= Hugh Gilshan =

Scottish footballer

Personal information
- Full name: Hugh Downie Gilshan
- Date of birth: 7 July 1945 (age 81)
- Position: Winger

Senior career*
Years	Team	Apps	(Gls)
–1963	Greenock Morton		
1963–1964	Celtic	0	(0)
1964–1965	Ayr United	17	(4)
1965–196?	Greenock Morton		
196?–1968	Johnstone Burgh		
1968–1971	St Mirren	74	(13)
1971–197?	Johnstone Burgh		
- * Club domestic league appearances and goals

Hugh Downie Gilshan (born 7 July 1945) is a Scottish former footballer who played as a winger. Gilshan is best known for his time with St Mirren from February 1968 to May 1971, where he made 74 appearances. He also played for Greenock Morton, Celtic, Ayr United and Johnstone Burgh.
