= Tommy Turner (footballer) =

Scottish footballer

Personal information
- Full name: Thomas Turner
- Date of birth: 11 October 1963 (age 63)
- Place of birth: Johnstone, Scotland
- Position: Midfielder

Senior career*
Years	Team	Apps	(Gls)
- Glentyan Thistle
1984–1990	Morton	175	(29)
1990–1994	St Johnstone	139	(7)
1994–1997	Partick Thistle	37	(5)
1997–2002	St Mirren	116	(9)
1998	Queen of the South (loan)	5	(0)
2002–2004	Gretna	20	(0)
2004–20??	Johnstone Burgh		
Total		492	(50)
- * Club domestic league appearances and goals

Thomas Turner (born 11 October 1963 in Johnstone, Renfrewshire) is a Scottish former professional footballer.

== Career ==
Turner was captain of the St Mirren side that won the Scottish First Division in 1999–2000. Previous to that he played for Greenock Morton, St Johnstone and Partick Thistle. In his second year at St Mirren, Turner went on a month's loan to Queen of the South after an altercation with supporters of his own team. He finished his professional career with Gretna in 2004.

After leaving senior football he joined the junior leagues to captain his home town team, Johnstone Burgh.

== Personal life ==
Turner's son, Kyle, currently plays as a midfielder for Raith Rovers.
