= Mănești, Dâmbovița =

Mănești
- Commune
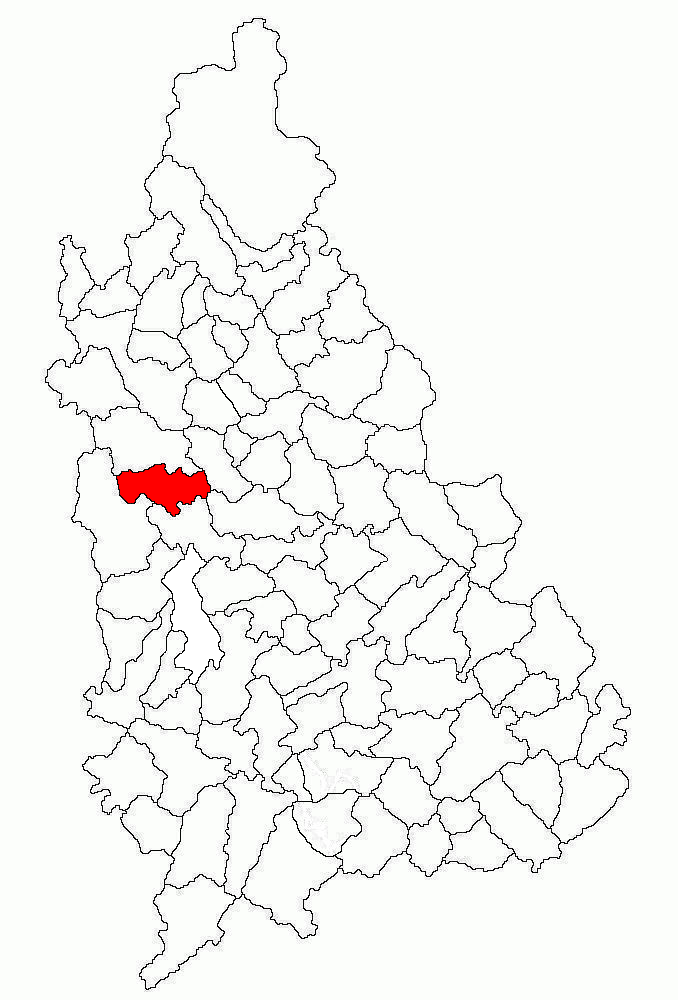
- Location in Dâmbovița County

- Location in Romania
- Coordinates: 44°58′N 25°17′E
- Country: Romania
- County: Dâmbovița
- Subdivisions: Drăgăești-Pământeni, Drăgăești-Ungureni, Mănești

Government
  - Mayor (2024–2028): Constantin Alexandru (PSD)
- Area: 37.95 km^{2} (14.65 sq mi)
- Elevation: 352 m (1,155 ft)
- Population (2021-12-01): 5,361
  - Density: 140/km^{2} (370/sq mi)
- Time zone: EET/EEST (UTC+2/+3)
- Postal code: 137290
- Area code: +(40) 245
- Vehicle reg.: DB
- Website: comunamanestidb.ro

Map of the Mănești commune

Mănești is a commune in Dâmbovița County, Muntenia, Romania, in the valley of the Dâmbovița River, at a distance of 14 kilometres (8.7 miles) northwest of Târgoviște.

== Administration ==
It was formerly part of plasa Voinești and between 1952 and 1968 it was part of Ploiești Region. In 1968, the current administration was set and since, it is part of Dâmbovița County.

It is composed of three villages: Drăgăești-Pământeni (colloquially "Drăgăești"), Drăgăești-Ungureni (colloquially "Ungureni"), and Mănești. Mănești and Drăgăești are on the right bank of the Dâmbovița River, while Ungureni is on the left bank.

== Name ==
The name of Mănești is derived from "Manea" (a Romanian first name), the name of Drăgăești from "Drag" (meaning "dear" in Romanian) and the name of Ungureni from "Ungurean" (people from the Hungarian lands, that is, Transylvania), as Romanians from Transylvania, then ruled by Hungary, settled in this place.

== Population ==
Historical population
Year	Pop.	±%
1912	3,422	—
1924	3,123	−8.7%
2002	4,669	+49.5%
2011	5,004	+7.2%
2021	5,361	+7.1%
Source: Census data

At the 2002 census, Mănești had 4,669 inhabitants, of which 96.6% were of Romanian ethnicity; 3.4% were Roma, concentrated in the village of Drăgăești. At the 2021 census, the commune had a population of 5,361; of those, 87.13% were Romanians and 5.89% Roma.

== Economy ==
Most people are farmers, among the crops are apples and pears, as well as maize and wheat. A part of the inhabitants commute to Târgoviște, which is the closest city. Also, there used to be some petroleum extraction in the region, but the resources ended. In Ungureni, there was also a petroleum storage depot, but it was disbanded in the 1990s.

== Nearby localities ==
- Căprioru (North-West)
- Decindeni (South-West)
- Dragomirești (South)
- Gheboieni (North-East)
- Priseaca (South-East)
- Tătărani (North-West)
