= Youri Djorkaeff =

French footballer (born 1968)

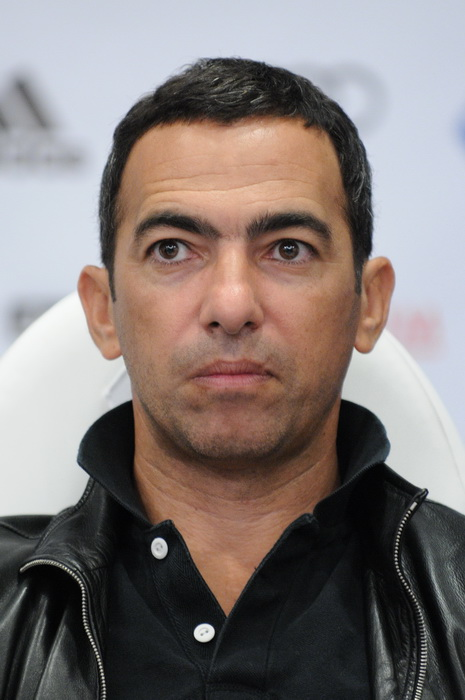
- Djorkaeff in 2011

Personal information
- Full name: Youri Raffi Djorkaeff
- Date of birth: 9 March 1968 (age 58)
- Place of birth: Lyon, France
- Height: 1.78 m (5 ft 10 in)
- Positions: Attacking midfielder; forward

Youth career
- UGA Décines
- Saint-Priest
- US Meyzieu
- AS Villeurbanne
- –1985: Grenoble

Senior career*
Years	Team	Apps	(Gls)
1984–1989	Grenoble	82	(23)
1989–1990	Strasbourg	35	(25)
1990–1995	Monaco	155	(59)
1995–1996	Paris Saint-Germain	35	(13)
1996–1999	Inter Milan	87	(30)
1999–2002	Kaiserslautern	55	(14)
2002–2004	Bolton Wanderers	75	(20)
2004	Blackburn Rovers	3	(0)
2005–2006	New York Red Bulls	45	(12)
Total		584	(196)

International career
1993	France B	2	(3)
1993–2002	France	82	(28)
Medal record
Men's football
Representing France
FIFA World Cup
Winner	1998 France
UEFA European Championship
Winner	2000 Belgium–Netherlands
FIFA Confederations Cup
Winner	2001 Korea/Japan
- * Club domestic league appearances and goals

Youri Raffi Djorkaeff (born 9 March 1968) is a French former professional footballer who played as an attacking midfielder or forward. Throughout his club career, he played for teams in France, Italy, Germany, England, and the United States.

At international level, Djorkaeff scored 28 goals in 82 appearances with the France national team between 1993 and 2002. He won the 1998 FIFA World Cup, Euro 2000, and the 2001 FIFA Confederations Cup, also taking part at Euro 1996 and the 2002 FIFA World Cup. He is the son of former player Jean Djorkaeff. On hanging up his boots in 2006 and after having played in France, Italy, Germany, England and the US, Youri devoted himself to social projects, which eventually led him to establish the Youri Djorkaeff Foundation in 2014. He currently holds the position of CEO of the FIFA Foundation, following his appointment in September 2019.

== Early life ==
Youri Raffi Djorkaeff was born on 9 March 1968 in Lyon, to a French father of Polish and Kalmyk origin, Jean Djorkaeff, and an Armenian mother, Mary Ohanian.

== Club career ==
Djorkaeff started his career in 1984 with French club Grenoble, before moving to RC Strasbourg in 1989, AS Monaco in 1990, and then Paris Saint-Germain in 1995. In 1994, Djorkaeff led Division 1 in goals with 20. He won the UEFA Cup Winners' Cup with PSG in 1996. In 190 French top-flight matches Djorkaeff scored 73 goals.

In 1996, he signed with Italian club Inter Milan. In his first season, he scored 17 goals in 49 appearances across all competitions, scoring 14 goals in 33 Serie A appearances; with his excellent performances, he helped the club to a third–place finish in Serie A, and also reached the UEFA Cup Final. Inter were defeated in the final by Schalke on penalties following a 1–1 draw on aggregate; Djorkaeff was suspended for the first leg although he was able to net his spot kick in the second leg shootout. During the course of the season, he also scored a memorable goal from a bicycle kick in a 3–1 home win against Roma in the league, on 5 January 1997, which is considered to be one of the greatest goals scored in the club's history. His following season was less successful individually, as he struggled to play well alongside the club's new signing Ronaldo, although collectively Inter finished the season in second place in Serie A and won the UEFA Cup, defeating Lazio 3–0 in the final at the Parc des Princes. In his third and final season with the team, following the signing of Roberto Baggio, he also struggled to find space in the team, and suffered a further loss of form; moreover, the club eventually finished the season in eighth place, outside of all possible European qualifying spots.

In 1999, he transferred to Germany and Kaiserslautern, helping them to the semi-finals of the UEFA Cup in 2001.

Djorkaeff turned many heads when signing with English club Bolton Wanderers in 2002, but added a lot of class to the team during his three seasons there, resulting in the creation of an international "dream-team" alongside the tricky Nigerian Jay-Jay Okocha, and former Real Madrid midfielder Iván Campo. He was a member of the squad that reached the final of the 2003–04 League Cup. He then transferred to Blackburn Rovers but left the club after playing in only three games.

Djorkaeff then signed with the MetroStars of Major League Soccer in February 2005, turning down higher paid offers from other countries. He became the first French player to play in MLS and ended the season as the team's MVP with ten goals and seven assists in league play.

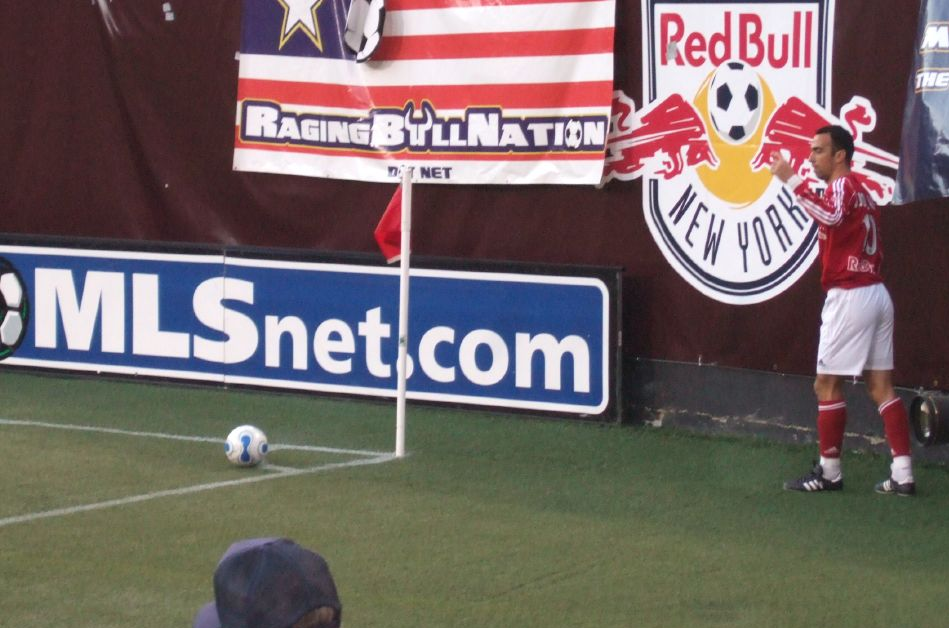
Djorkaeff playing for New York Red Bulls in 2006

Djorkaeff announced from the beginning that he would hang-up his boots at the end of 2006 season, and played for the re-branded New York Red Bulls. On 1 July 2006, he was spotted in the crowd with French fans at the FIFA World Cup quarter-final match between France and Brazil after telling Red Bulls officials he left the club to attend to "an unexpected, serious family matter in France." Upon his return, he revealed that the purpose of his departure was to be with his sick mother and downplayed watching the World Cup match.

He retired from professional football on 29 October 2006.

== International career ==
Djorkaeff accumulated 82 caps and scored 28 goals for France at senior level between 1993 and 2002. Other than the two major tournaments he won with the national side – the 1998 FIFA World Cup and UEFA Euro 2000 – Djorkaeff also played for his country in UEFA Euro 1996 and the 2002 FIFA World Cup. In the 1998 FIFA World Cup Final in Paris, he set-up Zinedine Zidane's second goal from a corner in an eventual 3–0 victory over defending champions Brazil against his close friend and club teammate Ronaldo.

== Style of play ==
Nicknamed The Snake, due to his ability to get past defenders and bend the ball, Djorkaeff was a talented playmaker, who usually played as an attacking midfielder, although he was also capable of playing in deeper positions in midfield on occasion – namely as a central midfielder – or in more attacking roles, as a creative second striker, or even as an outright striker, while he often featured in a wide role on the left flank at international level. An elegant and technically gifted player, he was mainly known for his flair, dribbling skills, and excellent touch on the ball; he was also known for his vision, passing, composure, and class, and possessed a good shot, which enabled him both to score and create goals. He was known for his positional sense and intelligent movement off the ball, as well as his ability to lose his markers with his attacking runs and create space for himself, or provide depth to the team; he was also highly regarded for his accuracy from free kicks and penalties with his right foot. A hard-working player, who was known for his defensive contribution off the ball, he had the ability to link the defence with the attack or drift out wide in a free role in midfield; as such, his playing style and role has been described as that of a "nine and a half," half-way between that of a midfielder and that of a forward, which from a tactical standpoint, however, occasionally made it difficult for managers to find the right position for him on the pitch that best suited his capabilities. Moreover, despite his talent and success, he was also accused of being inconsistent at times in the media.

== Personal life ==
Djorkaeff and his wife, Sophie, and three children: Sacha, Oan and Angelica. Djorkaeff released a singing single called "Vivre dans Ta Lumière" ("Living in Your Light"). His father, Jean, and younger brother, Micha Djorkaeff, were also professional football players. On 15 November 2012, Djorkaeff hosted Phone-a-thon for Armenian charity held in Europe. The Phoneathon benefits the construction of community centres in villages throughout Nagorno Karabakh and comprehensive agricultural development in Armenia's Tavush Region. In addition, a part of the proceeds will be dedicated to providing urgent aid to the Syrian-Armenian community. During his time in England, Djorkaeff opened a football school in Armenia. In April 2007, once he had retired as a player, he became the president of his childhood club in Lyon - Union Generale Armenienne de Decines. Djorkaeff currently also runs the Youri Djorkaeff Foundation, a non-profit organisation dedicated to providing football programs in New York City. Ecuadorian international forward Djorkaeff Reasco was named after him, as was Curaçaoan Tahith Chong.

== Career statistics ==
=== Club ===
Appearances and goals by club, season and competition
Club	Season	League			National cup		League cup		Continental		Total	
Club	Season	Division	Apps	Goals	Apps	Goals	Apps	Goals	Apps	Goals	Apps	Goals
Grenoble	1984–85	Division 2	3	0	0	0	–		–		3	0
Grenoble	1985–86	Division 2	6	0	0	0	–		–		6	0
Grenoble	1986–87	Championnat National	26	4	0	0	–		–		26	4
Grenoble	1987–88	Division 2	19	8	1	0	–		–		20	8
Grenoble	1988–89	Division 2	25	11	3	1	–		–		28	12
Grenoble	1989–90	Division 2	3	0	0	0	–		–		3	0
Grenoble	Total		82	23	4	1	0	0	0	0	86	24
Strasbourg	1989–90	Division 2	28	21	2	0	–		–		30	21
Strasbourg	1990–91	Division 2	7	4	0	0	–		–		7	4
Strasbourg	Total		35	25	2	0	0	0	0	0	37	25
Monaco	1990–91	Division 1	20	5	6	1	–		–		26	6
Monaco	1991–92	Division 1	35	9	5	0	–		7	1	47	10
Monaco	1992–93	Division 1	32	11	2	2	–		4	1	38	14
Monaco	1993–94	Division 1	35	20	2	0	–		11	3	48	23
Monaco	1994–95	Division 1	33	14	1	0	3	0	–		37	14
Monaco	Total		155	59	16	3	3	0	22	5	196	67
Paris Saint-Germain	1995–96	Division 1	35	13	2	2	1	0	8	4	46	19
Inter Milan	1996–97	Serie A	33	14	6	1	–		10	2	49	17
Inter Milan	1997–98	Serie A	29	8	4	0	–		9	0	42	8
Inter Milan	1998–99	Serie A	25	8	6	4	–		5	2	36	14
Inter Milan	Total		87	30	16	5	0	0	24	4	127	39
1. FC Kaiserslautern	1999–2000	Bundesliga	25	11	1	0	0	0	5	2	31	13
1. FC Kaiserslautern	2000–01	Bundesliga	26	3	2	0	0	0	7	2	35	5
1. FC Kaiserslautern	2001–02	Bundesliga	4	0	0	0	–		–		4	0
1. FC Kaiserslautern	Total		55	14	3	0	0	0	12	4	70	18
Bolton Wanderers	2001–02	Premier League	12	4	2	0	1	0	0	0	15	4
Bolton Wanderers	2002–03	Premier League	36	7	1	0	1	0	0	0	38	7
Bolton Wanderers	2003–04	Premier League	27	9	2	0	5	1	0	0	34	10
Bolton Wanderers	Total		75	20	5	0	7	1	-	-	87	21
Blackburn Rovers	2004–05	Premier League	3	0	0	0	0	0	0	0	3	0
MetroStars / New York Red Bulls	2005	Major League; Soccer	24	10	2	1	–		–		26	11
MetroStars / New York Red Bulls	2006	Major League; Soccer	21	2	1	0	–		–		22	2
MetroStars / New York Red Bulls	Total		45	12	3	1	0	0	0	0	48	13
Career total			572	196	47	12	9	1	66	17	694	226

=== International ===
Appearances and goals by national team and year
National team	Year	Apps	Goals
France	1993	1	0
France	1994	5	3
France	1995	7	5
France	1996	12	5
France	1997	6	3
France	1998	18	3
France	1999	9	3
France	2000	11	4
France	2001	7	2
France	2002	6	0
Total		82	28

Scores and results list France's goal tally first, score column indicates score after each Djorkaeff goal.

List of international goals scored by Youri Djorkaeff
No.	Date	Venue	Opponent	Score	Result	Competition
1	16 February 1994	San Paolo Stadium, Naples, Italy	Italy	1–0	1–0	Friendly
2	22 March 1994	Stade de Gerland, Lyon, France	Chile	2–1	3–1	Friendly
3	29 May 1994	National Stadium, Tokyo, Japan	Japan	1–0	4–1	1994 Kirin Cup
4	16 August 1995	Parc des Princes, Paris, France	Poland	1–1	1–1	UEFA Euro 1996 qualifying
5	6 September 1995	Stade de l'Abbé-Deschamps, Auxerre, France	Azerbaijan	2–0	10–0	UEFA Euro 1996 qualifying
6	6 September 1995	Stade de l'Abbé-Deschamps, Auxerre, France	Azerbaijan	9–0	10–0	UEFA Euro 1996 qualifying
7	11 October 1995	Stadionul Steaua, Bucharest, Romania	Romania	2–0	3–1	UEFA Euro 1996 qualifying
8	15 November 1995	Stade Michel d'Ornano, Caen, France	Israel	2–0	2–0	UEFA Euro 1996 qualifying
9	24 January 1996	Parc des Princes, Paris, France	Portugal	1–1	3–2	Friendly
10	24 January 1996	Parc des Princes, Paris, France	Portugal	2–2	3–2	Friendly
11	15 June 1996	Elland Road, Leeds, England	Spain	1–0	1–1	UEFA Euro 1996
12	31 August 1996	Parc des Princes, Paris, France	Mexico	2–0	2–0	Friendly
13	9 October 1996	Parc des Princes, Paris, France	Turkey	3–0	4–0	Friendly
14	2 April 1997	Parc des Princes, Paris, France	Sweden	1–0	1–0	Friendly
15	11 June 1997	Parc des Princes, Paris, France	Italy	2–1	2–2	1997 Tournoi de France
16	12 November 1997	Stade Geoffroy-Guichard, Saint-Etienne, France	Scotland	2–1	2–1	Friendly
17	29 May 1998	Stade Mohamed V, Casablanca, Morocco	Morocco	2–2	2–2	1998 King Hassan II International Cup Tournament
18	24 June 1998	Stade de Gerland, Lyon, France	Denmark	1–0	2–1	1998 FIFA World Cup
19	14 November 1998	Stade de France, Saint-Denis, France	Andorra	2–0	2–0	UEFA Euro 2000 qualifying
20	20 January 1999	Stade Velodrome, Marseille, France	Morocco	1–0	1–0	Friendly
21	8 September 1999	Hrazdan Stadium, Yerevan, Armenia	Armenia	1–1	3–2	UEFA Euro 2000 qualifying
22	9 October 1999	Stade de France, Saint-Denis, France	Iceland	2–1	3–2	UEFA Euro 2000 qualifying
23	4 June 2000	Stade Mohamed V, Casablanca, Morocco	Japan	2–2	2–2	2000 King Hassan II International Cup Tournament
24	6 June 2000	Stade Mohamed V, Casablanca, Morocco	Morocco	2–0	5–1	2000 King Hassan II International Cup Tournament
25	16 June 2000	Jan Breydel Stadium, Bruges, Belgium	Czech Republic	2–1	2–1	UEFA Euro 2000
26	25 June 2000	Jan Breydel Stadium, Bruges, Belgium	Spain	2–1	2–1	UEFA Euro 2000
27	25 April 2001	Stade de France, Saint-Denis, France	Portugal	4–0	4–0	Friendly
28	30 May 2001	Daegu World Cup Stadium, Daegu, South Korea	South Korea	4–0	5–0	2001 FIFA Confederations Cup

== Honours ==
Monaco

- Coupe de France: 1990–91

Paris Saint-Germain

- Trophée des Champions: 1995
- UEFA Cup Winners' Cup: 1995–96

Inter Milan

- UEFA Cup: 1997–98

Bolton Wanderers

- Football League Cup runner-up: 2003–04

France

- FIFA World Cup: 1998
- UEFA European Championship: 2000
- FIFA Confederations Cup: 2001
- Kirin Cup: 1994

Individual

- Division 1 top scorer: 1993–94
- UEFA European Championship Team of the Tournament: 1996
- UEFA European Championship top assist provider: 1996
- Pirata d'Oro (Inter Milan Player of the Year): 1997
- World XI: 1997

Orders

- Knight of the Legion of Honour: 1998

== See also ==
- List of leading goalscorers for the France national football team

== Bibliography ==
- Youri Djorkaeff, Snake, Paris, Grasset and Fasquelle, 2006, ISBN 22-46695-71-6. (in French)
