= Micha Djorkaeff =

French footballer (born 1974)

Personal information
- Date of birth: 24 March 1974 (age 52)
- Place of birth: Rueil-Malmaison, France
- Height: 1.76 m (5 ft 9 in)
- Position: Midfielder

Senior career*
Years	Team	Apps	(Gls)
1992–1993	Grenoble		
1993–1995	Rouen		
1995–1997	Olympique Alès		
1997–1998	Inter Milan	0	(0)
1997	→ Fiorenzuola (loan)	0	(0)
1998	→ Étoile Carouge FC (loan)		
1998–1999	Étoile FC		
2000–2002	1. FC Kaiserslautern II		
2002	Luton Town	0	(0)
2003–2006	UGA Dècines		
2007	Monts d'Or Anse Foot		

Managerial career
- 2018–2025: ES La Ciotat
- 2025–: Armenia U19
- * Club domestic league appearances and goals

Micha Djorkaeff (born 24 March 1974) is a French former professional footballer who played as a midfielder.

== Career ==
Micha Djorkaeff played in French lower series for Grenoble, Rouen and Olympique Ales. In 1997, his older brother Youri recommended him to the Serie A club that he was playing for at the time, Inter Milan, that aggregated him at the team for a friendly summer tournament in Hong Kong. Despite scoring one goal he did not play very well and was sold to Fiorenzuola in Serie C1. There he never managed to play a game and after a year he was sold to Étoile Carouge FC. He then continued his career with Étoile FC, 1. FC Kaiserslautern II, Luton Town and Decines.

== Personal life ==
Micha Djorkaeff is the son of former French footballer Jean Djorkaeff, and the younger brother of former French international footballer Youri Djorkaeff, and the uncle of Oan Djorkaeff.
