= Dragomirești, Dâmbovița =

Dragomirești
- Commune
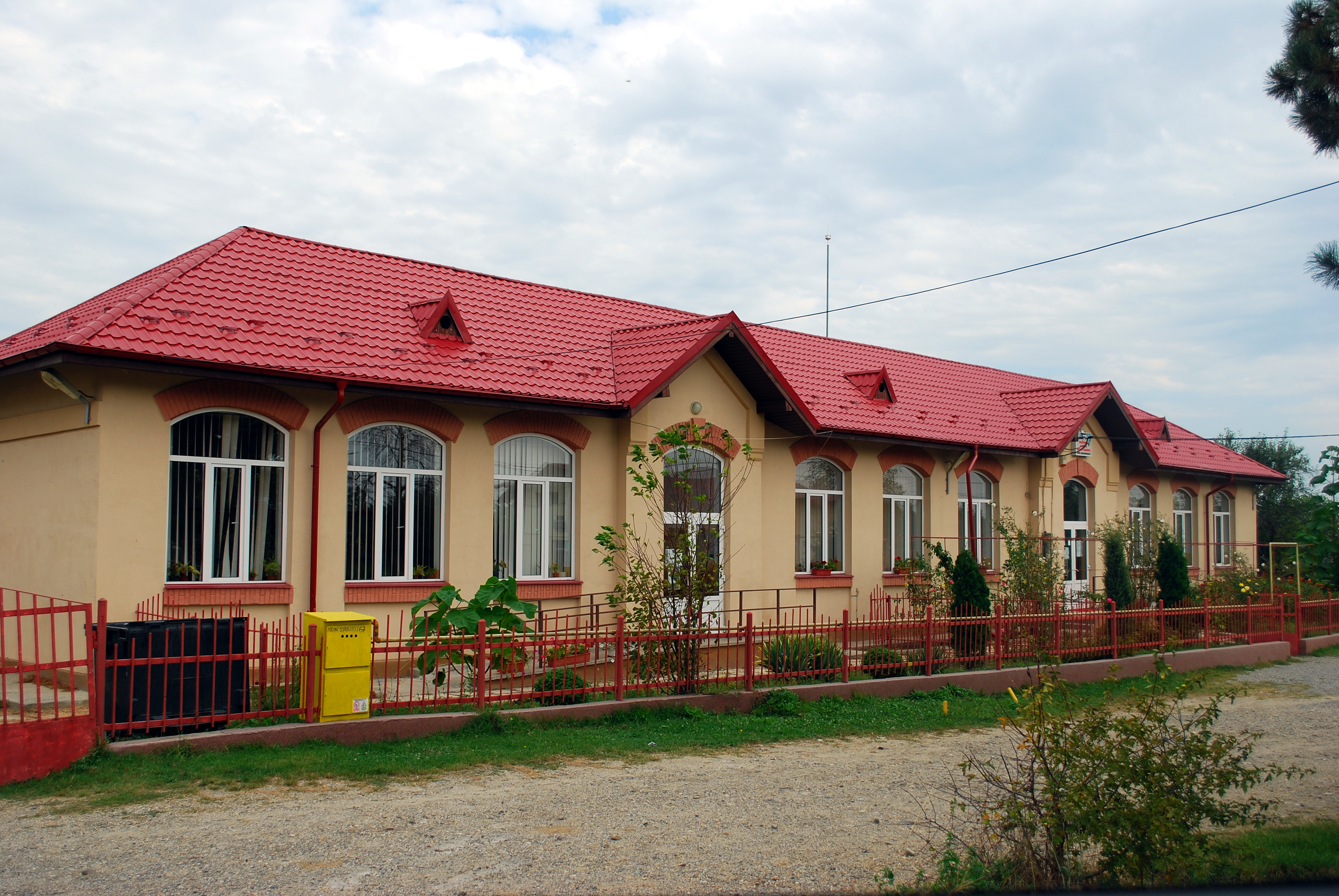
- Râncăciov schoolhouse

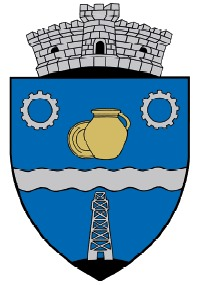
- Coat of arms

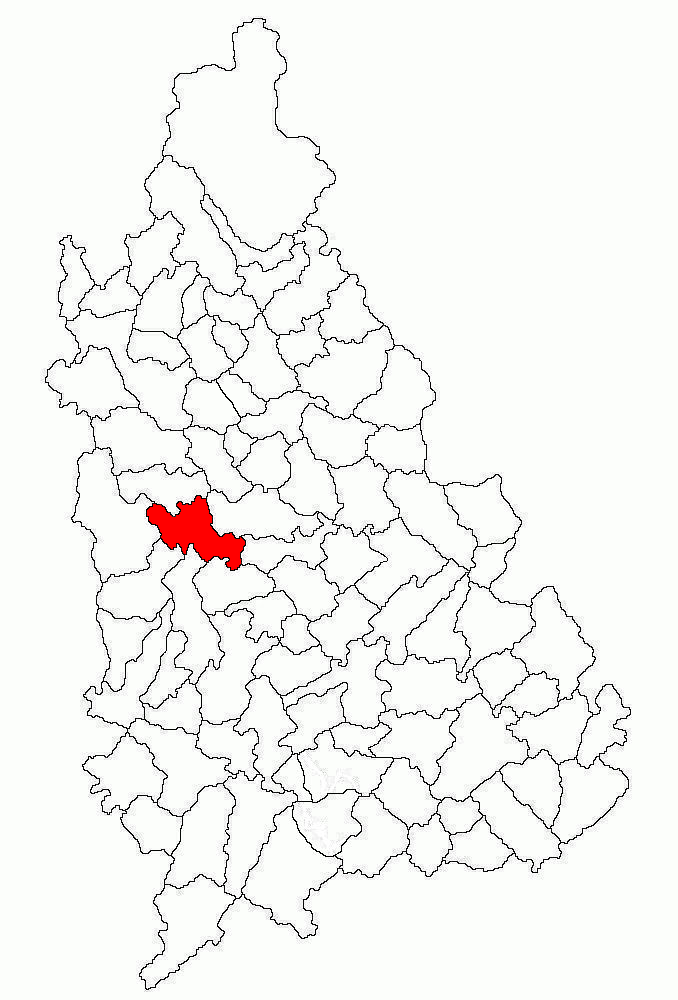
- Location in Dâmbovița County

- Location in Romania
- Coordinates: 44°55′N 25°20′E
- Country: Romania
- County: Dâmbovița

Government
  - Mayor (2024–2028): Dragoș Vlădulescu (PSD)
- Elevation: 294 m (965 ft)
- Population (2021-12-01): 8,835
- Time zone: UTC+02:00 (EET)
  - Summer (DST): UTC+03:00 (EEST)
- Postal code: 137210
- Area code: +(40) 245
- Vehicle reg.: DB
- Website: www.dragomirestidambovita.ro

Dragomirești is a commune in Dâmbovița County, Muntenia, Romania. It is composed of six villages: Decindeni, Dragomirești, Geangoești, Mogoșești, Râncăciov, and Ungureni.

Historical population
Year	Pop.	±%
2002	8,273	—
2011	8,867	+7.2%
2021	8,835	−0.4%
Source: Census data

== Natives ==
- Laurențiu Corbu (born 1994), footballer
