= Jean Djorkaeff =

French footballer and manager (born 1939)

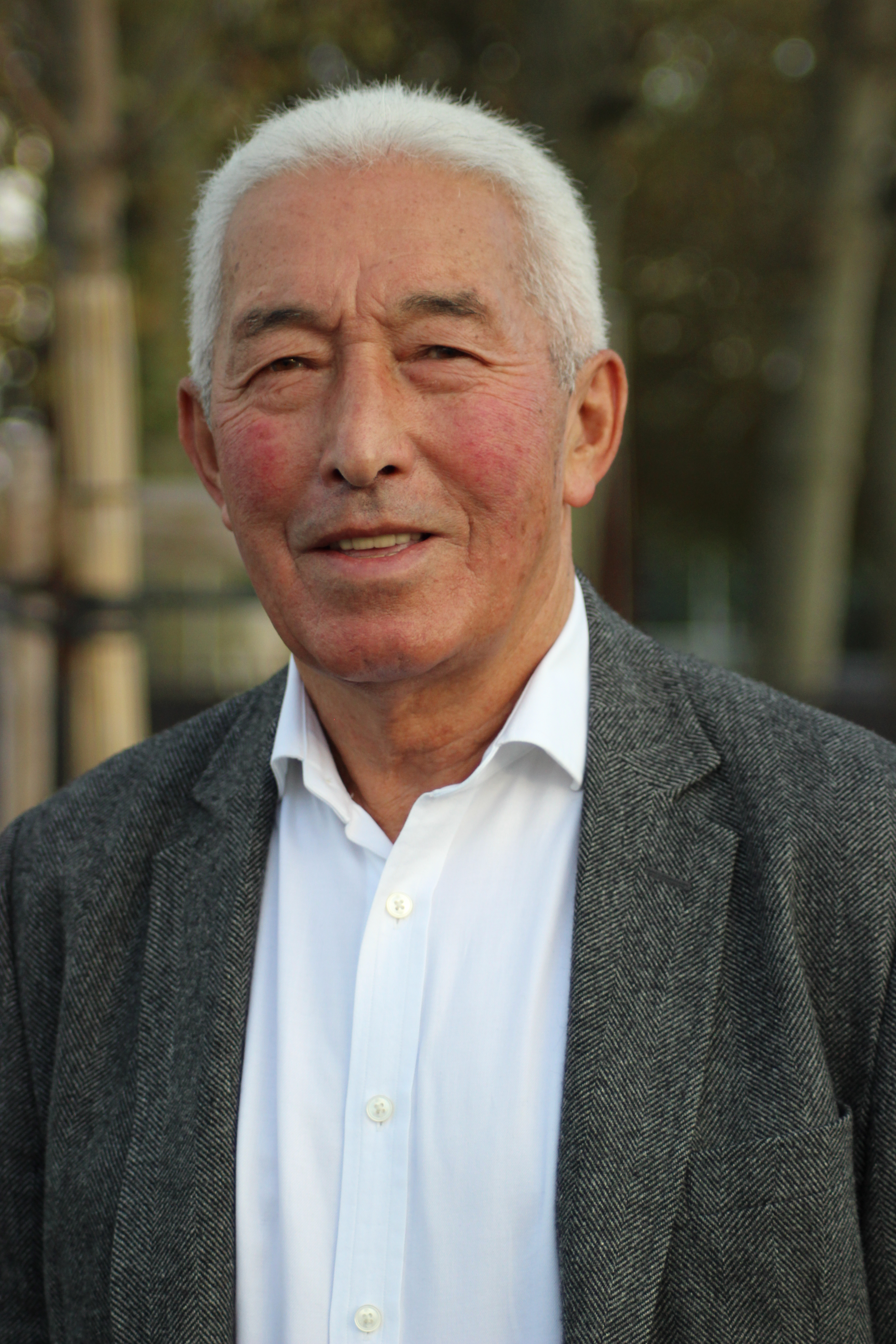
- Djorkaeff in 2014

Personal information
- Date of birth: 27 October 1939 (age 87)
- Place of birth: Charvieu, France
- Height: 1.73 m (5 ft 8 in)
- Position: Defender

Youth career
- Saint-Maurice

Senior career*
Years	Team	Apps	(Gls)
1958–1966	Lyon	155	(18)
1966–1970	Marseille	139	(12)
1970–1972	Paris Saint-Germain	64	(7)
1972–1974	Paris FC	64	(3)
Total		422	(40)

International career
1964–1972	France	48	(3)

Managerial career
- 1972: Paris FC (interim)
- UGA Lyon-Décines
- 1981–1983: Grenoble
- 1983–1984: Saint-Étienne
- 1986–1987: France (assistant)
- UGA Lyon-Décines
- * Club domestic league appearances and goals

Jean Djorkaeff (born 27 October 1939) is a French former professional footballer and manager. As a player, he operated as a defender.

== Early life ==
Djorkaeff was born in the French commune of Charvieu, located in the département of Isère. He was born to a Kalmyk father, Armadyk Djorkaeff (Dzhorkayev), who emigrated from Imperial Russia, and Polish mother.

== Club career ==
Djorkaeff made his debut as a professional footballer playing for Lyon in a match against Limoges on 28 December 1958. Though he started out as a striker, he was famous for his work as central defender and appeared in around 400 matches in the French football league. He spent a total of 16 seasons within the first two tiers, during which he played with only four clubs (eight seasons with Lyon, four with Marseille, two with Paris Saint-Germain, and two with Paris FC). He won the Coupe de France twice, the first time with Lyon in 1964 and the second with Marseille in 1969.

== International career ==
At international level, Djorkaeff also played for France on 48 occasions between 1964 and 1972, scoring 3 goals. He represented his nation at the 1966 FIFA World Cup.

== Managerial career ==
Djorkaeff would become interim manager of Paris FC for two matches in 1972 while he was a player at the club. After his retirement from playing football, he would coach UGA Lyon-Décines. In 1981, Djorkaeff became manager of Grenoble. After two seasons at the Division 2 club, he left for first tier Saint-Étienne, where he would stay one season. From 1986 to 1987, he worked as assistant manager in the France national team. Later on, he would return to his position at UGA Lyon-Décines.

== After football ==
Djorkaeff would go on to serve as the president of the Coupe de France commission in 2000, a role he stayed at for seven years. In April 2007, he became general manager of UGA Lyon-Décines.

== Personal life ==
Jean's sons Youri and Micha Djorkaeff, and grandson Oan Djorkaeff, were also footballers. Youri played for France in the 1998 and 2002 FIFA World Cups, and at UEFA Euro 1996 and UEFA Euro 2000.

Jean's nickname is "Tchouki".

== Honours ==
Lyon

- Coupe de France: 1963–64; runner-up 1962–63

Marseille

- Coupe de France: 1968–69

Paris Saint-Germain

- Division 2: 1970–71

Individual

- Best full-back in France: 1970–71
