= Oan Djorkaeff =

French professional footballer (born 1997)

Personal information
- Date of birth: 30 April 1997 (age 29)
- Place of birth: Milan, Italy
- Height: 1.77 m (5 ft 10 in)
- Position: Midfielder

Team information
- Current team: Sanremese

Youth career
- 2012–2014: Saint-Étienne

Senior career*
Years	Team	Apps	(Gls)
2014–2016	Thonon Évian	6	(1)
2016–2017	Montpellier B	25	(1)
2017–2019	Nantes B	8	(0)
2019–2020	St Mirren	2	(0)
2020–2022	SC Kriens	33	(0)
2023–2024	Rapperswil-Jona	43	(20)
2024–2025	FC Paradiso	16	(5)
2025–	Sanremese		
- * Club domestic league appearances and goals as of 10:32, 5 January 2026 (UTC)

Oan Djorkaeff (born 30 April 1997) is a French professional footballer who plays for Sanremese as a midfielder.

== Early and personal life ==
Born in Milan, his father is Youri Djorkaeff. The family, which includes grandfather Jean Djorkaeff, uncle Micha Djorkaeff, and brother Sacha Djorkaeff is of Armenian descent.

== Career ==
After playing in France for Saint-Étienne, Thonon Évian, Montpellier B and Nantes B, he signed for Scottish club St Mirren in July 2019 following a trial. He made his debut for the club in the Scottish League Cup on 14 July 2019. He left the club at the end of the 2019–20 season.

In October 2020 he signed for Swiss club SC Kriens. He then played for Rapperswil-Jona. In July 2023 he was on trial at English club Reading. He later played for FC Paradiso and Sanremese.
