= James Kellermann =

English footballer (born 1994)

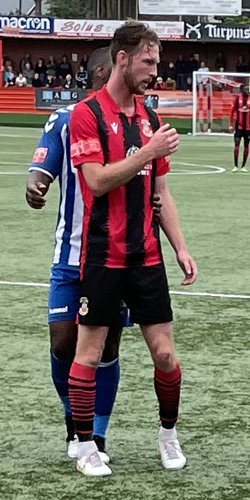
- Kellermann playing for Tamworth in 2021

Personal information
- Full name: James Aaron Kellermann
- Date of birth: 11 December 1994 (age 31)
- Place of birth: Hendon, England
- Height: 6 ft 1 in (1.85 m)
- Position: Midfielder

Team information
- Current team: Halesowen Town; Kidderminster Harriers (under-19s coach)

Youth career
- Kidderminster Lions
- Stourport Swifts
- 2010–2016: Wolverhampton Wanderers

Senior career*
Years	Team	Apps	(Gls)
2016–2018	Aldershot Town	68	(8)
2018–2019	St Mirren	3	(0)
2018–2019	→ AFC Fylde (loan)	13	(0)
2020–2021	Kidderminster Harriers	4	(0)
2021–2022	Chesterfield	30	(1)
2021	→ Tamworth (loan)	6	(2)
2022–2024	Woking	61	(6)
2024–2025	Ebbsfleet United	12	(0)
2024–2025	→ Kidderminster Harriers (loan)	10	(0)
2025–	Halesowen Town	9	(1)
- * Club domestic league appearances and goals as of 16:16, 8 May 2025 (UTC)

James Aaron Kellermann (born 11 December 1994) is an English footballer who plays as a midfielder for Southern League Premier Division Central club Halesowen Town. He is currently a coach with Kidderminster Harriers under-19s.

== Career ==
Kellermann spent his early career with Kidderminster Lions and Stourport Swifts before signing for Wolverhampton Wanderers at the age of 14. Following his release from Wolves he signed for Aldershot Town.

James signed a two-year contract with Scottish club St Mirren in May 2018. He made his debut for St Mirren on 13 July 2018 in the Scottish League Cup. He moved on loan to AFC Fylde in August 2018. He left St Mirren by mutual consent on 29 October 2019.

In March 2020 he signed for Kidderminster Harriers. He was released at the end of the 2020–21 season.

In August 2021 he signed for National League side Chesterfield. On 17 August 2021, James moved on loan to Southern League Premier Division Central side Tamworth. Kellermann made his debut for Tamworth in a Southern League Premier Division Central fixture on 17 August 2021 at home to Coalville Town; he played up until the 93rd minute, when he was substituted for defender Tom Ward, the match finished 1-1. He scored his first goal for the club in the next Southern League Premier Division Central fixture at home to Lowestoft Town on 21 August 2021. Kellermann scored the first goal of a 6-1 victory. Chesterfield exercised their option to recall Kellermann from his loan on 28 September 2021. He made six appearances and scored two goals during his spell with Tamworth.

Kellerman was offered a new contract at the end of the 2021–22 season, however was unable to agree terms with the club. He then signed for Woking in July 2022. Kellermann went onto make his debut for the club during an opening day away defeat to York City, playing 55 minutes in the 2–0 loss. On 3 December 2023, he scored his first goal for the club during a 3–1 home victory over Maidstone United, completing the scoring in the 82nd minute with Woking's third. He went onto score three more goals that campaign, including strikes against former sides, Aldershot Town and Chesterfield. During the course of the 2022–23 campaign, Kellermann signed a new one-year deal, keeping him at the club until June 2024. During his second season at Woking, Kellermann struggled with injuries and ultimately only featured 20 times in all competitions. On 24 April 2024, he announced that he would be leaving the club at the end of his contract.

On 28 May 2024, Kellerman agreed to join fellow National League side Ebbsfleet United upon the expiration of his contract with Woking. In December 2024, he returned to Kidderminster Harriers on an initial one-month loan deal. He departed Ebbsfleet United at the end of the 2024–25 season.

In August 2025, Kellerman joined Southern League Premier Division Central club Halesowen Town.

== Coaching career ==
In October 2025, Kellerman returned to former club Kidderminster Harriers, assisting in the coaching of the under-19s squad.

== Career statistics ==
As of end of 2024–25 season

Appearances and goals by club, season and competition
Club	Season	League			National Cup		League Cup		Other		Total	
Club	Season	Division	Apps	Goals	Apps	Goals	Apps	Goals	Apps	Goals	Apps	Goals
Aldershot Town	2016–17	National League	29	1	0	0	—		0	0	29	1
Aldershot Town	2017–18	National League	38	7	1	0	—		0	0	39	7
Aldershot Town	Total		67	8	1	0	—		0	0	68	8
St Mirren	2018–19	Scottish Premiership	3	0	0	0	3	1	0	0	6	1
St Mirren	2019–20	Scottish Premiership	0	0	0	0	1	0	1 (Note: One appearance in Scottish Challenge Cup)	0	2	0
St Mirren	Total		3	0	0	0	4	1	1	0	8	1
AFC Fylde (loan)	2018–19	National League	13	0	0	0	—		0	0	13	0
Kidderminster Harriers	2020–21	National League North	4	0	0	0	—		0	0	4	0
Chesterfield	2021–22	National League	30	1	4	1	—		2 (Note: Appearance(s) in National League play-offs)	0	36	2
Tamworth (loan)	2021–22	Southern League Premier Division Central	6	2	0	0	—		0	0	6	2
Woking	2022–23	National League	42	4	2	0	—		2 (Note: One appearance FA Trophy and one in National League play-off)	0	46	4
Woking	2023–24	National League	19	2	1	0	—		1 (Note: Appearance(s) in FA Trophy)	0	21	2
Woking	Total		61	6	3	0	—		3	0	67	6
Ebbsfleet United	2024–25	National League	12	0	1	0	—		1 (Note: Appearance(s) in National League Cup)	0	14	0
Kidderminster Harriers (loan)	2024–25	National League North	10	0	0	0	—		2	0	12	0
Career total			206	17	9	1	4	1	18	0	228	19
