= Laurențiu Corbu =

Romanian footballer

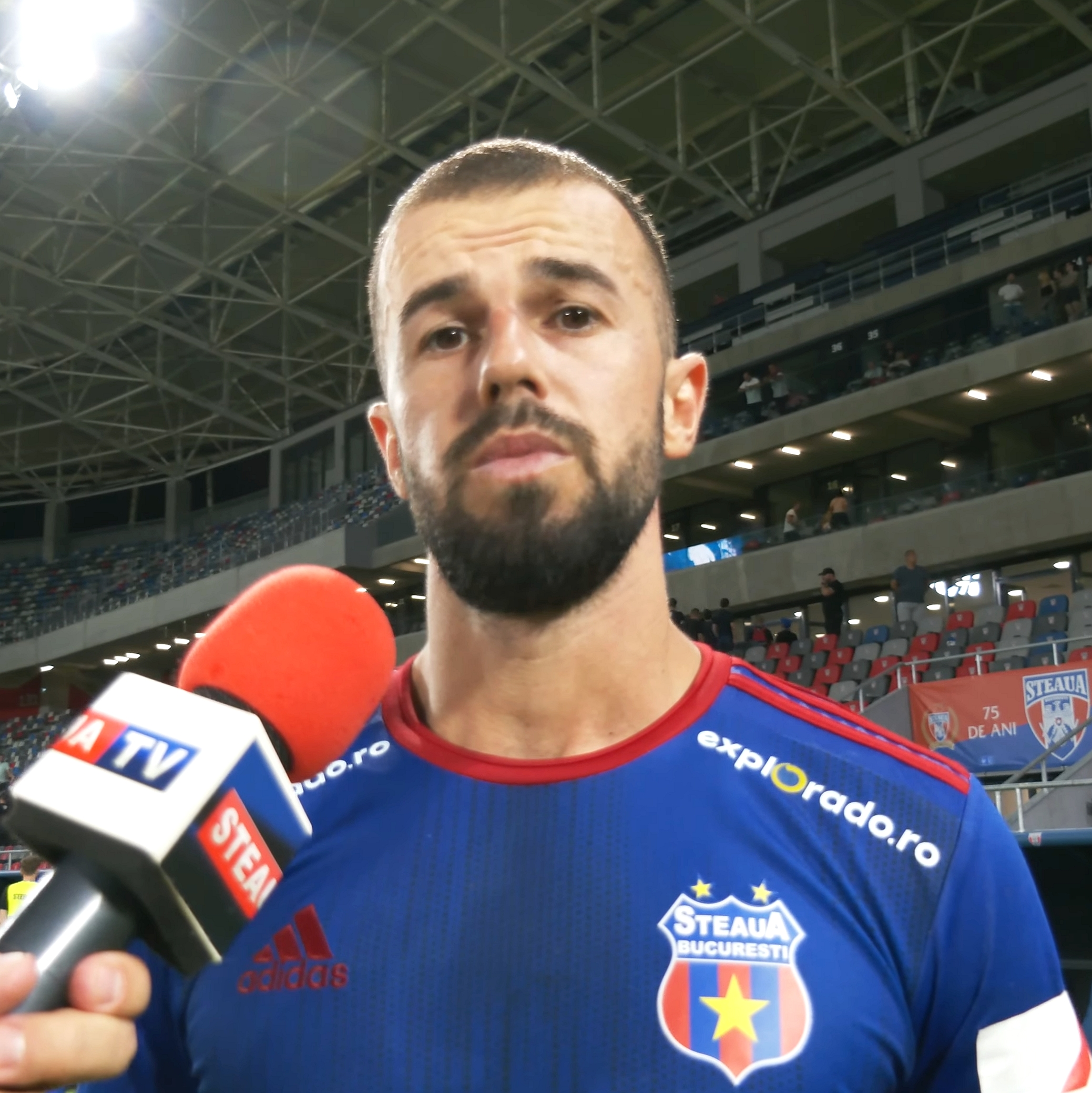
- Corbu in 2022

Personal information
- Full name: Laurențiu Nicolae Corbu
- Date of birth: 10 May 1994 (age 32)
- Place of birth: Râncăciov, Romania
- Height: 1.74 m (5 ft 9 in)
- Position: Right-back

Team information
- Current team: Metaloglobus București
- Number: 20

Youth career
- CSȘ Târgoviște
- –2010: Petrolul Târgoviște

Senior career*
Years	Team	Apps	(Gls)
2010–2015	Urban Titu		
2015–2020	Dinamo București	48	(0)
2019	→ St Mirren (loan)	3	(0)
2020–2022	Chindia Târgoviște	37	(0)
2022–2023	CSA Steaua București	19	(0)
2023–2024	Concordia Chiajna	23	(1)
2024	Mioveni	12	(0)
2025–2026	Inter Ilfov		
2026–	Metaloglobus București	4	(0)
- * Club domestic league appearances and goals as of 12 September 2026

Laurențiu Nicolae Corbu (born 10 May 1994) is a Romanian professional footballer who plays as a right-back for Liga II club Metaloglobus București.

== Career ==
=== Dinamo București ===
Corbu joined Dinamo Bucureșt in 2015, signing from Urban Titu.

=== St Mirren (loan) ===
In January 2019, Corbu joined Scottish side St Mirren on loan until the end of the season.

=== Chindia Târgoviște ===
On 11 February 2020, Corbu joined Romanian club Chindia Târgoviște.

== Honours ==
Dinamo București

- Cupa României runner-up: 2015–16
- Cupa Ligii: 2016–17
