= Sam Jamieson (footballer) =

Scottish footballer

Personal information
- Date of birth: 14 March 1999 (age 27)
- Position: Striker

Team information
- Current team: Troon

Youth career
- 2006–2016: Rangers

Senior career*
Years	Team	Apps	(Gls)
2016–2017	Rangers	0	(0)
2016–2017	→ Stirling University (loan)		
2017–2019	St Mirren	2	(0)
2019	→ Brechin City (loan)	10	(0)
2019–2020	East Kilbride		
2020–2021	Albion Rovers	15	(1)
2021–	Troon	18	(7)
- * Club domestic league appearances and goals as of 23:22, 31 October 2021 (UTC)

Samuel Jamieson (born 14 March 1999) is a Scottish professional footballer who plays for Troon as a striker.

== Career ==
Jamieson joined Rangers at the age of 7, and spent a loan spell with Stirling University, but left the club in June 2017. He then joined St Mirren, making his senior debut on 29 September 2018 in the Scottish Premiership. Jamieson moved on loan to Brechin City in February 2019.

Jamieson moved to Lowland league side East Kilbride for the 2019-20 season.

In July 2020 he signed for Albion Rovers. He signed for Troon in July 2021.
