= 2023–24 St Mirren F.C. season =

St Mirren
2023–24 season
- Chairman: John Needham
- Manager: Stephen Robinson
- Stadium: St Mirren Park
- Scottish Premiership: 5th
- Scottish League Cup: Quarter-final
- Scottish Cup: Fifth round
- Top goalscorer: League: Mikael Mandron (8); All: Mikael Mandron (11)
- Highest home attendance: 7,740, vs. Heart of Midlothian, Premiership, 6 April 2024
- Lowest home attendance: 2,059, vs. Arbroath, League Cup, 22 July 2023
- Average home league attendance: 6,646
Home colours	Away colours	Third colours

The 2023–24 season was St Mirren's 6th consecutive season in the top tier of Scottish football since being promoted from the Scottish Championship at the end of the 2017–18 season. The club also participated in the League Cup and Scottish Cup.

== Results and fixtures ==
Win Draw Loss Postponed

=== Pre-season and friendlies ===
28 June 2023 Friendly	Glentoran	0–0	St Mirren	Belfast
19:45 BST		Report		Stadium: The Oval

1 July 2023 Friendly	Linfield	0–1	St Mirren	Belfast
13:00 BST		Report	Olusanya 48'	Stadium: Windsor Park
Note: Match abandoned after 75 minutes after a fan took ill in the west stand.

4 July 2023 Friendly	Dumbarton	0–3	St Mirren	Dumbarton
19:45 BST		Report	Kiltie 17', 37'; Strain 44'	Stadium: Dumbarton Football Stadium

8 July 2023 Renfrewshire Cup	Greenock Morton	2–0	St Mirren	Greenock
15:00 BST	Muirhead 81'; McGrattan 82'	Report		Stadium: Cappielow

=== Scottish Premiership ===
6 August 2023 1	Hibernian	2–3	St Mirren	Easter Road
15:00 BST	Le Fondre 72'; Doidge 82'	Report	O'Hara 15' (pen.); Olusanya 17'; Greive 89'	Attendance: 17,586; Referee: Euan Anderson

12 August 2023 2	St Mirren	2–1	Dundee	St Mirren Park
15:00 BST	Shaughnessy 7' (o.g.); Mandron 45+4'	Report	Mulligan 63'	Attendance: 6,581; Referee: Colin Steven

27 August 2023 3	St Mirren	2–2	Aberdeen	St Mirren Park
15:00 BST	Kiltie 59' (pen.); Greive 76'	Report	Hayes 42'; Miovski 90+10' (pen.)	Attendance: 7,492; Referee: John Beaton

2 September 2023 4	Livingston	1–1	St Mirren	Tony Macaroni Arena
15:00 BST	de Lucas 89'	Report	Nahmani 90+6'	Attendance: 2,075; Referee: Nick Walsh

16 September 2023 5	Motherwell	0–1	St Mirren	Fir Park
15:00 BST		Report	Tanser 55'	Attendance: 5,653; Referee: Matthew MacDermid

23 September 2023 6	St Mirren	1–0	Heart of Midlothian	St Mirren Park
15:00 BST	Strain 7'	Report		Attendance: 7,537; Referee: Nick Walsh

30 September 2023 7	Kilmarnock	1–1	St Mirren	Rugby Park
15:00 BST	Lyons 19'	Report	Magennis 31' (o.g.)	Attendance: 6,124; Referee: Chris Graham

7 October 2023 8	St Mirren	0–3	Rangers	St Mirren Park
15:00 BST	Strain (red card) 28'	Report	Tavernier 30' (pen.), 90'; Sima 71'	Attendance: 6,984; Referee: Nick Walsh

28 October 2023 10	St Mirren	4–0	St Johnstone	St Mirren Park
15:00 BST	Baccus 36'; Mandron 48', 70'; Kiltie 90'	Report		Attendance: 5,552; Referee: David Dickinson

1 November 2023 11	Celtic	2–1	St Mirren	Celtic Park
19:45BST	Turnbull 18'; Oh 83'	Report	McMenamin 7'	Attendance: 58,168; Referee: John Beaton

8 November 2023 12	St Mirren	2–2	Hibernian	St Mirren Park
19:45BST	O'Hara 53' (pen.); Jamieson 90+2'	Report	Campbell 12'; Newell 69'	Attendance: 5,963; Referee: Steven McLean

11 November 2023 13	Dundee	4–0	St Mirren	Dens Park
15:00BST	Bakayoko 16', 57'; Rudden 45+2' (pen.); Robinson 84'	Report		Attendance: 5,496; Referee: Matthew MacDermid

25 November 2023 14	St Mirren	1–0	Livingston	St Mirren Park
15:00BST	Kelly 24' (o.g.)	Report		Attendance: 5,632; Referee: David Munro

28 November 2023 9	Ross County	1–0	St Mirren	Victoria Park
19:45 BST	White 84'	Report		Attendance: 3,758; Referee: William Collum
Note: Fixture re-arranged due to Storm Babet

3 December 2023 15	Rangers	2–0	St Mirren	Ibrox Stadium
15:00BST	Sima 45', 70'	Report		Attendance: 47,835; Referee: Matthew MacDermid

6 December 2023 16	St Johnstone	1–0	St Mirren	McDiarmid Park
19:45BST	Kane 90+6'	Report		Attendance: 2,449; Referee: Kevin Clancy

9 December 2023 17	St Mirren	2–0	Ross County	St Mirren Park
15:00BST	Leak 51' (o.g.); Ayunga 56'	Report		Attendance: 5,402; Referee: Calum Scott

16 December 2023 18	St Mirren	0–0	Motherwell	St Mirren Park
15:00BST		Report		Attendance: 5,837; Referee: Craig Napier

23 December 2023 19	Heart of Midlothian	2–0	St Mirren	Tynecastle Park
15:00BST	Shankland 33', 49'	Report		Attendance: 18,717; Referee: Nick Walsh

27 December 2023 20	St Mirren	0–1	Kilmarnock	St Mirren Park
19:45BST		Report	Watkins 25'	Attendance: 7,534; Referee: Euan Anderson

30 December 2023 21	Aberdeen	0–3	St Mirren	Pittodrie Stadium
15:00BST		Report	O'Hara 12'; Ayunga 78'; Kiltie 90+3' (pen.)	Attendance: 17,029; Referee: Grant Irvine

2 January 2024 22	St Mirren	0–3	Celtic	St Mirren Park
15:00BST	Olusanya (red card) 45+3'	Report	Maeda 1'; O'Riley 6'; Taylor 60'	Attendance: 6,943; Referee: David Munro

27 January 2024 23	St Mirren	0–1	Rangers	St Mirren Park
15:00BST		Report	Dessers 14'	Attendance: 6,665; Referee: David Dickinson

3 February 2024 24	Hibernian	0–3	St Mirren	Easter Road
15:00BST		Report	Gogić 8'; Kiltie 34' (pen.); Mandron 44'	Attendance: 16,689; Referee: William Collum

7 February 2024 25	St Mirren	2–0	Dundee	St Mirren Park
19:45BST	Mandron 73'; Bolton (red card) 84'; Olusanya 90+1'	Report		Attendance: 5,737; Referee: Steven McLean

17 February 2024 26	Livingston	1–0	St Mirren	Tony Macaroni Arena
15:00BST	Yengi 45+3'	Report		Attendance: 2,120; Referee: Euan Anderson

24 February 2024 27	St Mirren	2–0	St Johnstone	St Mirren Park
15:00BST	Mitov 36' (o.g.); Mandron 64'	Report		Attendance: 5,991; Referee: Grant Irvine

27 February 2024 28	Ross County	1–1	St Mirren	Victoria Park
19:45 BST	White 11'	Report	Olusanya 86'	Referee: Chris Graham

2 March 2024 29	St Mirren	2–1	Aberdeen	St Mirren Park
15:00BST	O'Hara 90+6' (pen.); Olusanya 90+7'	Report	Barron 1'	Attendance: 7,019; Referee: Nick Walsh

16 March 2024 30	Kilmarnock	5–2	St Mirren	Rugby Park
15:00 BST	Vassell 61', 73'; Armstrong 65' (pen.); Watkins 68'; Watson 79'	Report	Dunne 20'; Mandron 39'	Attendance: 8,460; Referee: Ross Hardie

30 March 2024 31	Motherwell	1–1	St Mirren	Fir Park
15:00 BST	Bair 74'	Report	Fraser 18'	Attendance: Matthew MacDermid; Referee: 5,492

6 April 2024 32	St Mirren	1–2	Heart of Midlothian	Tynecastle Park
15:00BST	Olusanya 68'	Report	Grant 33' (pen.); Mandron 62' (o.g.)	Attendance: 7,740; Referee: Alan Muir

13 April 2024 33	Celtic	3–0	St Mirren	Celtic Park
15:00 BST	Hatate 52'; Furuhashi 60'; Idah 86'	Report		Attendance: 58,888; Referee: Steven McLean

28 April 2024 34	St Mirren	1–2	Rangers	St Mirren Park
12:30BST	Mandron 37'	Report	Bolton 32' (o.g.); Dessers 74'	Attendance: 6,800; Referee: Nick Walsh

4 May 2024 35	Dundee	1–3	St Mirren	Dens Park
15:00 BST	Mellon 76'	Report	Gogić 38'; Tanser 59'; Olusanya 72'	Attendance: 6,877; Referee: Matthew McDermid

11 May 2024 36	St Mirren	0–1	Kilmarnock	St Mirren Park
15:00BST		Report	Vassell 37'	Attendance: Euan Anderson; Referee: 7,645

15 May 2024 37	St Mirren	2–2	Heart of Midlothian	St Mirren Park
19:45BST	Scott 7'; Bolton 65'	Report	Tagawa 20'; Shankland 72'	Attendance: 7,222; Referee: William Collum

18 May 2024 38	Celtic	3–2	St Mirren	Celtic Park
12:30 BST	O'Riley 21'; Furuhashi 37'; Palma 86'	Report	O'Hara 7', 26' (pen.)	Referee: Matthew McDermid

=== Scottish League Cup ===
==== Group stage ====
15 July 2023 Group Stage	Montrose	1–0	St Mirren	Links Park
15:00 BST	McAllister 58'	Report		Attendance: 1,618; Referee: William Collum

22 July 2023 Group Stage	St Mirren	4–0	Arbroath	St Mirren Park
15:00 BST	Mandron 10'; O'Hara 45'; Nahmani 71', 79'	Report		Attendance: 2,059; Referee: Graham Grainger

25 July 2023 Group Stage	Cowdenbeath	0–1	St Mirren	Central Park
19:45 BST	Smith (red card) 90+4'	Report	Olusanya 90+4'	Attendance: 859; Referee: Ross Hardie

29 July 2023 Group Stage	St Mirren	4–0	Forfar Athletic	St Mirren Park
15:00 BST	Mandron 14', 19'; O'Hara 42' (pen.); Gogić 45+1'	Report		Attendance: 2,380; Referee: Matthew MacDermid

==== Knockout phase ====
19 August 2023 Second round	St Mirren	1–0	Motherwell	St Mirren Park
15:00 BST	Boyd-Munce 9'	Report		Attendance: 5,241; Referee: William Collum

27 September 2023 Quarter-final	Hibernian	4–2	St Mirren	Easter Road
19:45 BST	Youan 52'; Vente 54'; Boyle 80', 90+3'	Report	Tanser 43'; Baccus 76'	Attendance: 9,982; Referee: David Munro

=== Scottish Cup ===
20 January 2024 Fourth round	St Mirren	1–0	Queen of the South	St Mirren Park
15:00 BST	Gogić 71'	Report		Attendance: 3,425; Referee: Nick Walsh

10 February 2024 Fifth round	St Mirren	0–2	Celtic	St Mirren Park
15:00 BST		Report	Furuhashi 15'; Maeda 53'	Attendance: 4,400; Referee: David Dickinson

== Player statistics ==
=== Appearances and goals ===
As of 18 May 2024

No.	Pos	Player	Premiership		League Cup		Scottish Cup		Total	
No.	Pos	Player	Apps	Goals	Apps	Goals	Apps	Goals	Apps	Goals
1	GK	(England) Zach Hemming	38+0	0	6+0	0	2+0	0	46	0
2	DF	(England) James Bolton	14+8	1	0+2	0	1+0	0	25	1
3	DF	(England) Scott Tanser	38+0	2	5+0	1	2+0	0	45	3
5	DF	(England) Richard Taylor	23+3	0	4+0	0	0+0	0	30	0
6	MF	(Scotland) Mark O'Hara	25+2	6	4+0	2	0+0	0	31	8
7	FW	(Kenya) Jonah Ayunga	8+9	2	0+0	0	1+1	0	19	2
8	MF	(Scotland) Ryan Flynn	5+6	0	0+0	0	0+0	0	11	0
9	FW	(France) Mikael Mandron	22+12	8	6+0	3	1+1	0	42	11
10	FW	(Northern Ireland) Conor McMenamin	21+6	1	3+1	0	1+0	0	32	1
11	MF	(Scotland) Greg Kiltie	34+0	4	4+0	0	2+0	0	40	4
13	MF	(Cyprus) Alex Gogić	38+0	2	6+0	1	2+0	1	46	4
14	FW	(Scotland) James Scott	4+7	1	0+0	0	0+1	0	12	1
15	MF	(Northern Ireland) Caolan Boyd-Munce	26+9	0	4+2	1	2+0	0	43	1
16	MF	(South Korea) Kwon Hyeok-kyu	8+0	0	0+0	0	1+0	0	9	0
17	MF	(Australia) Keanu Baccus	17+14	1	3+1	1	1+0	0	36	2
18	DF	(Republic of Ireland) Charles Dunne	5+15	1	3+1	0	1+0	0	25	1
20	FW	(England) Toyosi Olusanya	14+21	6	2+4	1	0+1	0	42	7
21	DF	(England) Jaden Brown	0+6	0	0+0	0	0+1	0	7	0
22	DF	(Scotland) Marcus Fraser	37+1	1	6+0	0	2+0	0	46	1
23	DF	(Australia) Ryan Strain	15+2	1	6+0	0	0+0	0	23	1
24	FW	(Scotland) Lewis Jamieson	6+13	1	0+4	0	1+1	0	25	1
27	GK	(Slovakia) Peter Urminský	0+0	0	0+0	0	0+0	0	0	0
34	FW	(Scotland) Ethan Sutherland	0+0	0	0+2	0	0+0	0	2	0
42	DF	(Uganda) Elvis Bwomono	10+3	0	0+0	0	2+0	0	15	0
Players who left the club during the 2023–24 season
16	DF	(England) Thierry Small	3+2	0	0+1	0	0+0	0	6	0
19	FW	(Israel) Stav Nahmani	2+6	1	2+2	2	0+0	0	12	3
21	FW	(New Zealand) Alex Greive	2+15	2	1+3	0	0+0	0	21	2
25	FW	(Scotland) Kieran Offord	0+0	0	0+0	0	0+0	0	0	0
26	DF	(Scotland) Luke Kenny	0+0	0	0+2	0	0+0	0	2	0
28	FW	(Scotland) Aiden Gilmartin	0+0	0	0+0	0	0+0	0	0	0
29	DF	(Northern Ireland) Gallagher Lennon	0+0	0	0+0	0	0+0	0	0	0
30	MF	(Scotland) Fraser Taylor	0+0	0	0+0	0	0+0	0	0	0
31	DF	(Scotland) Declan Gallagher	0+0	0	1+1	0	0+0	0	2	0

=== Goal scorers ===
As of match played 18 May 2024

Number	Position	Nation	Name	Total	Scottish Premiership	Scottish League Cup	Scottish Cup
2	DF	(England)	James Bolton	1	1		
3	DF	(England)	Scott Tanser	3	2	1	
6	MF	(Scotland)	Mark O'Hara	8	6	2	
7	FW	(Kenya)	Jonah Ayunga	2	2		
9	FW	(France)	Mikael Mandron	11	8	3	
10	FW	(Northern Ireland)	Conor McMenamin	1	1		
11	MF	(Scotland)	Greg Kiltie	4	4		
13	MF	(Cyprus)	Alex Gogić	4	2	1	1
14	FW	(Scotland)	James Scott	1	1		
15	MF	(Northern Ireland)	Caolan Boyd-Munce	1		1	
17	MF	(Australia)	Keanu Baccus	2	1	1	
18	DF	(Republic of Ireland)	Charles Dunne	1	1		
19	FW	(Israel)	Stav Nahmani	3	1	2	
20	FW	(England)	Toyosi Olusanya	7	6	1	
21	FW	(New Zealand)	Alex Greive	2	2		
22	DF	(Scotland)	Marcus Fraser	1	1		
23	DF	(Australia)	Ryan Strain	1	1		
24	FW	(Scotland)	Lewis Jamieson	1	1		
Total				54	41	12	1

=== Disciplinary record ===
Includes all competitive matches.

Last updated 18 May 2024

Number	Nation	Position	Name	Total		Scottish Premiership		League Cup		Scottish Cup	
Number	Nation	Position	Name	Booked	Sent off (straight red)	Booked	Sent off (straight red)	Booked	Sent off (straight red)	Booked	Sent off (straight red)
1	(England)	GK	Zach Hemming	3	0	3					
2	(England)	DF	James Bolton	0	1		1				
3	(England)	DF	Scott Tanser	6	0	6					
5	(England)	DF	Richard Taylor	6	0	5		1			
6	(Scotland)	MF	Mark O'Hara	6	0	4		2			
7	(Kenya)	FW	Jonah Ayunga	1	0	1					
8	(Scotland)	MF	Ryan Flynn	1	0	1					
9	(France)	FW	Mikael Mandron	3	0	2		1			
10	(Northern Ireland)	FW	Conor McMenamin	5	0	4		1			
11	(Scotland)	MF	Greg Kiltie	1	0	1					
13	(Cyprus)	MF	Alex Gogić	7	0	7					
15	(Northern Ireland)	MF	Caolan Boyd-Munce	4	0	3		1			
17	(Australia)	MF	Keanu Baccus	9	0	9					
18	(Republic of Ireland)	FW	Charles Dunne	1	0			1			
20	(England)	FW	Toyosi Olusanya	5	1	5	1				
22	(Scotland)	DF	Marcus Fraser	2	0	2					
23	(Australia)	DF	Ryan Strain	4	1	4	1				

== Team statistics ==
=== League table ===
Pos	Team	Pld	W	D	L	GF	GA	GD	Pts	Qualification or relegation (Note: Teams play each other three times (33 matches), before the league is split into two groups (the top six and the bottom six).)
3	Heart of Midlothian	38	20	8	10	54	42	+12	68	Qualification for the Europa League play-off round (Note: As the winners of the 2023–24 Scottish Cup, Celtic, qualified for the Champions League, the berth reserved for the cup winners (Europa League play-off round) passed to the third-placed team. The berths for the Europa League second qualifying round and the Conference League second qualifying round were passed down to the fourth- and fifth-placed teams.)
4	Kilmarnock	38	14	14	10	46	44	+2	56	Qualification for the Europa League second qualifying round
5	St Mirren	38	13	8	17	46	52	−6	47	Qualification for the Conference League second qualifying round
6	Dundee	38	10	12	16	49	68	−19	42	
7	Aberdeen	38	12	12	14	48	52	−4	48	

Rules for classification: 1) Points; 2) Goal difference; 3) Goals scored; 4) Head-to-Head points; 5) Head-to-Head goal difference; 6) Play-off (only if deciding champion, UEFA competitions qualification, second stage group allocation or relegation).

=== Division summary ===
Round	1	2	3	4	5	6	7	8	9	10	11	12	13	14	15	16	17	18	19	20	21	22	23	24	25	26	27	28	29	30	31	32	33	34	35	36	37	38
Ground	A	H	H	A	A	H	A	H	H	A	H	A	H	A	A	A	H	H	A	H	A	H	H	A	H	A	H	A	H	A	A	H	A	H	A	H	H	A
Result	W	W	D	D	W	W	D	L	W	L	D	L	W	L	L	L	W	D	L	L	W	L	L	W	W	L	W	D	W	L	D	L	L	L	W	L	D	L
Position	3	2	2	3	2	2	2	3	3	3	3	3	3	3	4	4	3	4	5	5	5	5	5	5	5	5	5	5	4	5	5	5	5	5	5	5	5	5

Updated to match(es) played on 18 May 2024. Source:
A = Away; H = Home; W = Win; D = Draw; L = Loss

==== League Cup table ====
Pos	Team	Pld	W	PW	PL	L	GF	GA	GD	Pts	Qualification	STM	FOR	ARB	MON	COW
1	St Mirren	4	3	0	0	1	9	1	+8	9	Qualification for the second round	—	4–0	4–0	—	—
2	Forfar Athletic	4	3	0	0	1	6	6	0	9		—	—	3–1	—	1–0
3	Arbroath	4	1	1	0	2	5	8	−3	5		—	—	—	3–0	p1–1
4	Montrose	4	1	1	0	2	3	6	−3	5		1–0	1–2	—	—	—
5	Cowdenbeath	4	0	0	2	2	2	4	−2	2		0–1	—	—	1–1p	—

Rules for classification: 1) goal difference, 2) goals scored, 3) away goals scored, 4) matches won, 5) away matches won, 6) drawing of lots.

== Transfers ==
=== Players in ===
Position	Nationality	Name	From	Transfer Window	Fee	Source
GK	(England)	Zach Hemming	Middlesbrough	Summer	Loan	
FW	(Israel)	Stav Nahmani	Maccabi Haifa	Summer	Loan	
FW	(Northern Ireland)	Conor McMenamin	Glentoran	Summer	Undisclosed	
FW	(France)	Mikael Mandron	Motherwell	Summer	Free	
DF	(England)	James Bolton	Plymouth Argyle	Summer	Free	
DF	(Northern Ireland)	Gallagher Lennon	Partick Thistle	Summer	Free	
DF	(England)	Thierry Small	Southampton	Summer	Loan	
DF	(Uganda)	Elvis Bwomono	ÍBV	Winter	Free	
MF	(South Korea)	Kwon Hyeok-kyu	Celtic	Winter	Loan	
FW	(Scotland)	James Scott	Exeter City	Winter	Loan	
DF	(England)	Jaden Brown	Lincoln City	Winter	Loan	

=== Players out ===
Position	Nationality	Name	To	Transfer Window	Fee	Source
DF	(Northern Ireland)	Daniel Finlayson	Linfield	Summer	Undisclosed	
FW	(England)	Curtis Main	Bengaluru	Summer	Free	
MF	(Scotland)	Dean McMaster	Airdrieonians	Summer	Free	
DF	(Republic of Ireland)	Joe Shaughnessy	Dundee	Summer	Free	
DF	(Scotland)	Richard Tait	Retired	Summer	Free	
FW	(Scotland)	Eamonn Brophy	Ross County	Summer	Undisclosed	
MF	(Scotland)	Jay Henderson	Ross County	Summer	Undisclosed	
DF	(Scotland)	Declan Gallagher	Dundee United	Summer	Undisclosed	
GK	(Northern Ireland)	Trevor Carson	Dundee	Summer	Undisclosed	
FW	(Scotland)	Kieran Offord	Edinburgh City	Summer	Loan	
MF	(Scotland)	Aiden Gilmartin	East Kilbride	Summer	Loan	
MF	(Scotland)	Fraser Taylor	Ballymena United	Summer	Loan	
DF	(Scotland)	Luke Kenny	Cliftonville	Summer	Loan	
DF	(Scotland)	Murray Campbell	Burnley	Summer	Compensation	
FW	(Scotland)	Kieran Offord	Stirling Albion	Winter	Loan	
FW	(New Zealand)	Alex Greive	Dundee United	Winter	Loan	
DF	(Northern Ireland)	Gallagher Lennon	Dumbarton	Winter	Loan	
FW	(Scotland)	Aiden Gilmartin	Stranraer	Winter	Loan	
