= 2022–23 St Mirren F.C. season =

St Mirren
2022–23 season
- Chairman: John Needham
- Manager: Stephen Robinson
- Stadium: St Mirren Park
- Scottish Premiership: 6th
- Scottish League Cup: Group stage
- Scottish Cup: Fifth round
- Top goalscorer: League: Mark O'Hara (10); All: Mark O'Hara (12)
- Highest home attendance: 7,937 vs. Kilmarnock, Premiership, 22 April 2023
- Lowest home attendance: 1,047 vs. Edinburgh, League Cup, 23 July 2022
- Average home league attendance: 6,401
Home colours	Away colours

The 2022–23 season is St Mirren's 5th consecutive season in the top tier of Scottish football since being promoted from the Scottish Championship at the end of the 2017–18 season. The club also participated in the League Cup and Scottish Cup.

== Season summary ==
- 17 May - the following players left the club at the end of the season: Alan Power (moved to Kilmarnock), Kyle McAllister (released), Matt Millar (released), Josh Jack (released), Conor McCarthy (rejected new contract), Jak Alnwick (moved to Cardiff City), Connor Ronan (end of loan) and Jordan Jones (end of loan).

Also on this day, midfielder Ryan Flynn signed a one-year contract extension, keeping him at the club until the summer of 2023.

- 20 May - midfielder Mark O'Hara signed from Motherwell on a two-year deal.
- 25 May - goalkeeper Trevor Carson signed from Dundee United on a two-year deal.

On this day St Mirren were drawn to play Arbroath, Airdrieonians, Edinburgh City and Cowdenbeath in Group E of the Scottish League Cup.

- 1 June - The club announced the signing of Kenyan winger Jonah Ayunga, who joined on a two-year deal and would be reunited with manager Stephen Robinson from his time at Morecambe.
- 8 June - defender Daniel Finlayson joined Linfield on a season long loan deal.
- 17 June - English forward Toyosi Olusanya signed for Saints on a two-year deal after leaving Middlesbrough.
- 21 June - Australian defender Ryan Strain signed for the club on a two-year deal after leaving Israeli side Maccabi Haifa.
- 26 June - Scottish international defender Declan Gallagher signed a two-year deal with Saints after his contract with Aberdeen was terminated.
- 27 June - midfielder Keanu Baccus signed a two-year deal from Australian club Western Sydney Wanderers
- 1 July - youth midfielder Dean McMaster joined Airdrieonians on loan.

== Results and fixtures ==
Win Draw Loss Postponed

=== Pre-season and friendlies ===
27 June 2022 Friendly	Crusaders	0–3	St Mirren	Belfast, Northern Ireland
18:30 BST		Report	Jamieson 37'; O'Hara 41'; Offord 55'	Stadium: Seaview

2 July 2022 Friendly	Linfield	1–2	St Mirren	Belfast, Northern Ireland
13:30 BST	Finlayson 19'	Report	Greive 2'; Ayunga 37'	Stadium: Windsor Park

5 July 2022 Friendly	St Mirren	1–3	Northampton Town	Paisley
19:00 BST	O'Hara 14'	Report	Appéré 21'; Hylton 77', 84' (pen.)	Stadium: St Mirren Park

29 August 2022 Friendly	St Mirren	1–2	Young Queen's Park	Paisley
19:00 BST	63'	Report	Naismith 4'; Moore 22'	Stadium: St Mirren Park

=== Scottish Premiership ===
31 July 2022 1	St Mirren	0–1	Motherwell	St Mirren Park
15:00 BST		Report	van Veen 42' (pen.); Lamie (red card) 82'	Attendance: 5,668; Referee: John Beaton

6 August 2022 2	Aberdeen	4–1	St Mirren	Pittodrie Stadium
15:00 BST	Miovski 24' (pen.), 37'; Clarkson 45'; Lopes 87'	Report	Gallagher (red card) 23'; Ayunga 53' (pen.)	Attendance: 14,420; Referee: Alan Muir

13 August 2022 3	St Mirren	1–0	Ross County	St Mirren Park
15:00 BST	Tait 50'	Report		Attendance: 4,557; Referee: Grant Irvine

20 August 2022 4	Dundee United	0–3	St Mirren	Dundee
15:00 BST		Report	Main 40', 51'; Greive 90+1'	Stadium: Tannadice Park; Attendance: 7,540; Referee: Matthew MacDermid

27 August 2022 5	St Mirren	1–0	Hibernian	St Mirren Park
15:00 BST	Baccus 6'	Report		Attendance: 5,343; Referee: Graham Grainger

3 September 2022 6	St Johnstone	3–0	St Mirren	Perth
15:00 BST	Clark 26'; Wright 66'; Carey 86' (pen.)	Report		Stadium: McDiarmid Park; Attendance: 3,640; Referee: Colin Steven

18 September 2022 7	St Mirren	2–0	Celtic	St Mirren Park
12:00 BST	O'Hara 43'; Ayunga 53'	Report		Attendance: 6,331; Referee: Don Robertson

1 October 2022 8	St Mirren	2–1	Livingston	St Mirren Park
15:00 BST	Baccus 69'; Ayunga (red card) 76'; Greive 90'	Report	Anderson 86'	Attendance: 5,366; Referee: Craig Napier

8 October 2022 9	Rangers	4–0	St Mirren	Ibrox Stadium
15:00 BST	Čolak 4', 73'; Tavernier 30' (pen.); Sakala 90+1'	Report		Attendance: 49,274; Referee: Nick Walsh

15 October 2022 10	St Mirren	0–0	Kilmarnock	St Mirren Park
15:00 BST		Report		Attendance: 6,785; Referee: Chris Graham

22 October 2022 11	St Mirren	2–1	Dundee United	Paisley
15:00 BST	Eriksson 41' (o.g.); Greive 83'	Report	Fletcher 58'	Stadium: St Mirren Park; Attendance: 6,273; Referee: Grant Irvine

29 October 2022 12	Hibernian	3–0	St Mirren	Easter Road
15:00 BST	Boyle 45+4' (pen.); Kukharevych 63'; Henderson 67'	Report		Attendance: 15,256; Referee: Don Robertson

5 November 2022 13	Ross County	3–2	St Mirren	Victoria Park
15:00 BST	White 10'; Tillson 56'; Harmon 60'	Report	Strain 13'; O'Hara 45+2'	Attendance: 3,589; Referee: John Beaton

9 November 2022 14	St Mirren	2–2	St Johnstone	St Mirren Park
15:00 BST	Kiltie 42'; O'Hara 81'	Report	Carey 33' (pen.); Mitchell (red card) 63'; Clark 90+6'	Attendance: 5,387; Referee: Euan Anderson

12 November 2022 15	St Mirren	1–1	Rangers	St Mirren Park
15:00 BST	Ayunga 47'	Report	Tavernier 84' (pen.)	Attendance: 6,358; Referee: Kevin Clancy

24 December 2022 16	St Mirren	3–1	Aberdeen	St Mirren Park
14:00 BST	Roos 38' (o.g.); O'Hara 53' (pen.); Kiltie 90+5'	Report	Kennedy 9'; Stewart (red card) 35'	Attendance: 7,394; Referee: Nick Walsh

28 December 2022 17	Livingston	1–1	St Mirren	Tony Macaroni Arena
19:45 BST	Pittman (red card) 24'; Montaño 56'	Report	O'Hara (red card) 55'; Main 63'	Attendance: 1,897; Referee: Steven McLean

2 January 2023 18	Kilmarnock	0–0	St Mirren	Rugby Park
15:00 BST		Report	Erhahon (red card) 7'	Attendance: 7,008; Referee: Grant Irvine

7 January 2023 19	St Mirren	1–1	Heart of Midlothian	St Mirren Park
15:00 BST	Strain 4'; Fraser (red card) 90+5'	Report	Snodgrass 49'	Attendance: 7,249; Referee: Chris Graham

13 January 2023 20	Heart of Midlothian	1–0	St Mirren	Tynecastle Park
19:45 BST	McKay 29'	Report		Attendance: 18,721; Referee: David Munro

18 January 2023 21	Celtic	4–0	St Mirren	Celtic Park
19:45 BST	Abada 15'; Furuhashi 35', 53'; Turnbull 86'	Report		Attendance: 58,493; Referee: Steven McLean

28 January 2023 22	St Mirren	1–0	Motherwell	St Mirren Park
15:00 BST	Main 16'	Report		Attendance: 6,424; Referee: John Beaton

1 February 2023 23	Aberdeen	1–3	St Mirren	Pittodrie Stadium
19:45 BST	McCrorie (red card) 7'; Miovski 74' (pen.)	Report	Main 57', 81'; Gallagher 90'	Attendance: 13,014; Referee: Grant Irvine

4 February 2023 24	St Mirren	0–1	Hibernian	St Mirren Park
15:00 BST		Report	Youan 77'	Attendance: 7,253; Referee: Matthew MacDermid

15 February 2023 25	Motherwell	2–1	St Mirren	Fir Park
19:45 BST	van Veen 8'; Johnston 18'	Report	Strain 24'	Attendance: 4,978; Referee: John Beaton

18 February 2023 26	St Mirren	1–0	Ross County	St Mirren Park
15:00 BST	Gallagher 7'	Report	Edwards (red card) 90+3'	Attendance: 5,634; Referee: Graham Grainger

25 February 2023 27	St Johnstone	1–1	St Mirren	McDiarmid Park
15:00 BST	Phillips (red card) 45'; Rudden 75'	Report	Gogić 86'	Attendance: 3,828; Referee: Craig Napier

5 March 2023 28	St Mirren	1–5	Celtic	St Mirren Park
12:00 BST	O'Hara 6' (pen.); Dunne (red card) 38'	Report	Jota 56'; Johnston 61'; Abada 70'; O'Riley 72'; Oh 81' (pen.)	Attendance: 6,939; Referee: David Dickinson

18 March 2023 29	Dundee United	1–1	St Mirren	Tannadice Park
15:00 BST	Fletcher 3'	Report	O'Hara 73' (pen.)	Attendance: 8,131; Referee: Craig Napier

1 April 2023 30	St Mirren	3–0	Livingston	St Mirren Park
12:00 BST	O'Hara 5' (pen.), 42' (pen.); Watt 18'	Report		Attendance: 5,984; Referee: John Beaton

8 April 2023 31	Heart of Midlothian	0–2	St Mirren	Tynecastle Park
15:00 BST	Snodgrass (red card) 62'	Report	Main 52'; Gogić 57'	Attendance: 18,660; Referee: Matthew MacDermid

15 April 2023 32	Rangers	5–2	St Mirren	Ibrox Stadium
15:00 BST	Cantwell 26'; Sakala 48'; Morelos 80', 81'; Arfield 86'	Report	O'Hara 45+2', 65'	Attendance: 48,703; Referee: Steven McLean

22 April 2023 33	St Mirren	0–2	Kilmarnock	St Mirren Park
12:00 BST	Small (red card) 68'	Report	Donnelly 18'; Doidge 35'	Attendance: 7,937; Referee: William Collum

6 May 2023 34	Hibernian	2–1	St Mirren	Easter Road
15:00 BST	Youan 4'; Fish 23'	Report	Greive 64'	Attendance: 16,334; Referee: Matthew MacDermid

13 May 2023 35	St Mirren	2–2	Heart of Midlothian	St Mirren Park
15:00 BST	Shaughnessy 36'; Strain 45+4'	Report	Ginnelly 73'; Haring (red card) 77'; Shankland 90+6' (pen.)	Attendance: 7,238; Referee: David Dickinson

20 May 2023 36	Celtic	2–2	St Mirren	Celtic Park
15:00 BST	Furuhashi 14'; McGregor 81'	Report	Main 4', 39'	Referee: David Munro

24 May 2023 37	Aberdeen	3–0	St Mirren	Pittodrie Stadium
19:45 BST	Clarkson 14'; Shinnie 43', 49'	Report	Small (red card) 31'	Attendance: 16,303; Referee: Don Robertson

28 May 2023 38	St Mirren	0–3	Rangers	St Mirren Park
12:30 BST		Report	Sakala 26', 48'; Čolak 77'	Attendance: 7,490; Referee: Matthew MacDermid

=== Scottish League Cup ===
==== Group stage ====
9 July 2022 1	St Mirren	0–1	Arbroath	St Mirren Park
15:00 BST		Report	Paterson 90+3'	Attendance: 1,923; Referee: Kevin Clancy

16 July 2022 2	Cowdenbeath	0–2	St Mirren	Central Park
15:00 BST		Report	Ayunga 19', 23'	Attendance: 638; Referee: Craig Napier

19 July 2022 3	Airdrieonians	2–0	St Mirren	Excelsior Stadium
19:45 BST	Devenny 66'; Gunn 90+5'	Report	Kiltie (red card) 33'	Attendance: 1,127; Referee: Alan Muir

23 July 2022 4	St Mirren	3–1	Edinburgh	St Mirren Park
15:00 BST	O'Hara 8' (pen.); Ayunga 25', 46'	Report	Handling 53'	Attendance: 1,047; Referee: Craig Napier

=== Scottish Cup ===
21 January 2023 Fourth Round	St Mirren	0–0 (a.e.t.) (3–0 p)	Dundee	St Mirren Park
15:00 BST		Report		Attendance: 4,254; Referee: Colin Steven
	Penalties
	Brophy (penalty missed); O'Hara (penalty scored); Greive (penalty scored); Kiltie (penalty scored)		(penalty missed) Rudden; (penalty missed) Thomas; (penalty missed) Cameron

11 February 2023 Fifth Round	Celtic	5–1	St Mirren	Celtic Park
15:00	Maeda 16'; Hatate 76' (pen.), 90+5'; Oh 80'; O'Riley 90'	Report	Taylor (red card) 75'; O'Hara 87' (pen.)	Attendance: 37,728; Referee: Steven McLean

== Player statistics ==
=== Appearances and goals ===
As of 27 May 2023

No.	Pos	Player	Premiership		League Cup		Scottish Cup		Total	
No.	Pos	Player	Apps	Goals	Apps	Goals	Apps	Goals	Apps	Goals
1	GK	(Northern Ireland) Trevor Carson	37+0	0	1+0	0	2+0	0	40	0
2	DF	(Scotland) Richard Tait	7+5	1	1+1	0	0+0	0	14	1
3	DF	(England) Scott Tanser	23+7	0	3+0	0	2+0	0	35	0
4	DF	(Republic of Ireland) Joe Shaughnessy	14+8	1	3+0	0	0+2	0	27	1
5	DF	(England) Richard Taylor	7+3	0	0+0	0	1+0	0	11	0
6	MF	(Scotland) Mark O'Hara	34+1	10	4+0	1	2+0	1	41	12
7	FW	(Kenya) Jonah Ayunga	16+3	3	4+0	4	1+0	0	24	7
8	MF	(Scotland) Ryan Flynn	3+17	0	1+0	0	0+2	0	23	0
9	FW	(Scotland) Tony Watt	7+3	1	0+0	0	0+1	0	11	1
10	FW	(England) Curtis Main	35+1	9	0+0	0	1+0	0	37	9
11	MF	(Scotland) Greg Kiltie	18+17	2	2+1	0	0+2	0	40	2
13	MF	(Cyprus) Alex Gogić	23+7	2	0+0	0	2+0	0	32	2
15	MF	(Northern Ireland) Caolan Boyd-Munce	1+2	0	0+0	0	0+0	0	3	0
16	DF	(England) Thierry Small	6+7	0	0+0	0	0+1	0	14	0
17	MF	(Australia) Keanu Baccus	30+3	2	1+0	0	2+0	0	36	2
18	DF	(Republic of Ireland) Charles Dunne	31+2	0	2+0	0	1+0	0	36	0
21	FW	(New Zealand) Alex Greive	12+16	4	3+1	0	1+1	0	34	4
22	DF	(Scotland) Marcus Fraser	33+1	0	2+1	0	2+0	0	39	0
23	DF	(Australia) Ryan Strain	35+1	4	2+0	0	2+0	0	40	4
24	FW	(Scotland) Lewis Jamieson	1+6	0	0+1	0	0+0	0	8	0
25	FW	(Scotland) Kieran Offord	0+9	0	2+1	0	0+0	0	12	0
27	GK	(Slovakia) Peter Urminský	1+0	0	3+0	0	0+0	0	4	0
30	MF	(Scotland) Fraser Taylor	0+4	0	0+1	0	0+0	0	5	0
31	DF	(Scotland) Declan Gallagher	21+6	2	3+0	0	2+0	0	32	2
Players who left the club during the 2022–23 season
9	FW	(Scotland) Eamonn Brophy	1+11	0	0+0	0	0+1	0	13	0
12	MF	(Scotland) Jay Henderson	0+3	0	0+2	0	0+0	0	5	0
15	MF	(Scotland) Dylan Reid	0+2	0	0+2	0	0+0	0	4	0
16	MF	(Scotland) Ethan Erhahon	20+0	0	4+0	0	0+1	0	25	0
19	DF	(Northern Ireland) Daniel Finlayson	0+0	0	0+0	0	0+0	0	0	0
20	FW	(England) Toyosi Olusanya	0+1	0	2+2	0	0+0	0	5	0
26	GK	(England) Dean Lyness	0+0	0	0+0	0	0+0	0	0	0
36	MF	(Scotland) Ewan Thompson	0+0	0	0+0	0	0+0	0	0	0
46	FW	(Scotland) Aiden Gilmartin	0+0	0	0+0	0	0+0	0	0	0
–	DF	(Scotland) Dean McMaster	0+0	0	0+0	0	0+0	0	0	0

=== Goal scorers ===
As of match played 27 May 2023

Number	Position	Nation	Name	Total	Scottish Premiership	Scottish League Cup	Scottish Cup
2	DF	(Scotland)	Richard Tait	1	1		
4	DF	(Republic of Ireland)	Joe Shaughnessy	1	1		
6	MF	(Scotland)	Mark O'Hara	12	10	1	1
7	FW	(Kenya)	Jonah Ayunga	7	3	4	
9	FW	(Scotland)	Tony Watt	1	1		
10	FW	(England)	Curtis Main	9	9		
11	MF	(Scotland)	Greg Kiltie	2	2		
13	MF	(Cyprus)	Alex Gogić	2	2		
17	MF	(Australia)	Keanu Baccus	2	2		
21	FW	(New Zealand)	Alex Greive	4	4		
23	DF	(Australia)	Ryan Strain	4	4		
31	DF	(Scotland)	Declan Gallagher	2	2		
Total				47	41	5	1

=== Disciplinary record ===
Includes all competitive matches.

Last updated 27 May 2023

Number	Nation	Position	Name	Total		Scottish Premiership		League Cup		Scottish Cup	
Number	Nation	Position	Name	Booked	Sent off (straight red)	Booked	Sent off (straight red)	Booked	Sent off (straight red)	Booked	Sent off (straight red)
1	(Northern Ireland)	GK	Trevor Carson	1	0	1					
2	(Scotland)	DF	Richard Tait	2	0	1		1			
3	(England)	DF	Scott Tanser	4	0	4					
4	(Republic of Ireland)	DF	Joe Shaughnessy	1	0	1					
5	(England)	DF	Richard Taylor	1	1	1					1
6	(Scotland)	MF	Mark O'Hara	8	1	8	1				
7	(Kenya)	FW	Jonah Ayunga	5	1	5	1				
8	(Scotland)	MF	Ryan Flynn	1	0	1					
10	(England)	FW	Curtis Main	5	0	5					
11	(Scotland)	MF	Greg Kiltie	4	1	4			1		
13	(Cyprus)	MF	Alex Gogić	6	0	6					
15	(Scotland)	MF	Dylan Reid	1	0	1					
16	(Scotland)	MF	Ethan Erhahon	3	1	3	1				
16	(England)	DF	Thierry Small	3	2	3	2				
17	(Australia)	MF	Keanu Baccus	10	0	9				1	
18	(Republic of Ireland)	MF	Charles Dunne	9	1	9	1				
21	(New Zealand)	FW	Alex Greive	2	0	2					
22	(Scotland)	DF	Marcus Fraser	8	0	8					
23	(Australia)	DF	Ryan Strain	4	0	4					
25	(Scotland)	FW	Kieran Offord	1	0	1					
31	(Scotland)	DF	Declan Gallagher	8	1	8	1				

== Team statistics ==
=== League table ===
Pos	Team	Pld	W	D	L	GF	GA	GD	Pts	Qualification or relegation (Note: Teams play each other three times (33 matches), before the league is split into two groups (the top six and the bottom six).)
4	Heart of Midlothian	38	15	9	14	63	57	+6	54	Qualification for the Europa Conference League third qualifying round
5	Hibernian	38	15	7	16	57	59	−2	52	Qualification for the Europa Conference League second qualifying round
6	St Mirren	38	12	10	16	43	61	−18	46	
7	Motherwell	38	14	8	16	53	51	+2	50	
8	Livingston	38	13	7	18	36	60	−24	46	

Rules for classification: 1) Points; 2) Goal difference; 3) Goals scored; 4) Head-to-Head points; 5) Head-to-Head goal difference; 6) Play-off (only if deciding champion, UEFA competitions qualification, second stage group allocation or relegation).

=== Division summary ===
Round	1	2	3	4	5	6	7	8	9	10	11	12	13	14	15	16	17	18	19	20	21	22	23	24	25	26	27	28	29	30	31	32	33	34	35	36	37	38
Ground	H	A	H	A	H	A	H	H	A	H	H	A	A	H	H	H	A	A	H	A	A	H	A	H	A	H	A	H	A	H	A	A	H	A	H	A	A	H
Result	L	L	W	W	W	L	W	W	L	D	W	L	L	D	D	W	D	D	D	L	L	W	W	L	L	W	D	L	D	W	W	L	L	L	D	D	L	L
Position	11	12	8	6	5	6	4	3	4	4	4	5	5	8	7	6	5	5	6	6	7	6	4	6	6	5	5	6	7	5	5	5	6	6	6	6	6	6

Updated to match(es) played on 27 May 2023. Source:
A = Away; H = Home; W = Win; D = Draw; L = Loss

==== League Cup table ====
Pos	Team	Pld	W	PW	PL	L	GF	GA	GD	Pts	Qualification	ARB	AIR	STM	EDI	COW
1	Arbroath	4	4	0	0	0	10	1	+9	12	Qualification for the second round	—	3–0	—	—	3–0
2	Airdrieonians	4	2	0	1	1	6	4	+2	7		—	—	2–0	1–1p	—
3	St Mirren	4	2	0	0	2	5	4	+1	6		0–1	—	—	3–1	—
4	Edinburgh	4	1	1	0	2	6	7	−1	5		1–3	—	—	—	3–0
5	Cowdenbeath	4	0	0	0	4	0	11	−11	0		—	0–3	0–2	—	—

Rules for classification: 1) goal difference, 2) goals scored, 3) away goals scored, 4) matches won, 5) away matches won, 6) drawing of lots.

== Transfers ==
=== Players in ===
Position	Nationality	Name	From	Transfer Window	Fee	Source
MF	(Scotland)	Mark O'Hara	Motherwell	Summer	Free	
GK	(Northern Ireland)	Trevor Carson	Dundee United	Summer	Undisclosed	
MF	(Kenya)	Jonah Ayunga	Morecambe	Summer	Free	
FW	(England)	Toyosi Olusanya	Middlesbrough	Summer	Free	
DF	(Australia)	Ryan Strain	Maccabi Haifa	Summer	Free	
DF	(Scotland)	Declan Gallagher	Aberdeen	Summer	Free	
MF	(Australia)	Keanu Baccus	Western Sydney Wanderers	Summer	Free	
MF	(Cyprus)	Alex Gogić	Hibernian	Summer	Free	
DF	(England)	Richard Taylor	Waterford	Winter	Free	
DF	(England)	Thierry Small	Southampton	Winter	Loan	
FW	(Scotland)	Tony Watt	Dundee United	Winter	Loan	
MF	(Northern Ireland)	Caolan Boyd-Munce	Middlesbrough	Winter	Free	

=== Players out ===
Position	Nationality	Name	To	Transfer Window	Fee	Source
GK	(England)	Jak Alnwick	Cardiff City	Summer	Free	
FW	(Scotland)	Josh Jack	Forfar Athletic	Summer	Free	
MF	(Scotland)	Kyle McAllister	Forest Green Rovers	Summer	Free	
DF	(Republic of Ireland)	Conor McCarthy	Barnsley	Summer	Free	
DF	(Australia)	Matthew Millar	Macarthur FC	Summer	Free	
MF	(Republic of Ireland)	Alan Power	Kilmarnock	Summer	Free	
DF	(Northern Ireland)	Daniel Finlayson	Linfield	Summer	Loan	
MF	(Scotland)	Dean McMaster	Airdrieonians	Summer	Loan	
FW	(Scotland)	Lewis Jamieson	Airdrieonians	Summer	Loan	
FW	(Scotland)	Kieran Offord	Alloa Athletic	Summer	Loan	
GK	(England)	Dean Lyness	Airdrieonians	Winter	Free	
MF	(Scotland)	Jay Henderson	Inverness CT	Winter	Loan	
FW	(England)	Toyosi Olusanya	Arbroath	Winter	Loan	
FW	(Scotland)	Eamonn Brophy	Ross County	Winter	Loan	
MF	(Scotland)	Ethan Erhahon	Lincoln City	Winter	Undisclosed	
MF	(Scotland)	Dylan Reid	Crystal Palace	Winter	Undisclosed	
