= 2009–10 Falkirk F.C. season =

Falkirk
2009–10 season
- Chairman: Martin Ritchie
- Manager: Eddie May (until 11 February); Steven Pressley
- Stadium: Falkirk Stadium
- Scottish Premier League: Twelfth place (relegated)
- League Cup: Third round
- Scottish Cup: Fourth round
- Europa League: Second qualifying round
- Top goalscorer: League: Carl Finnigan, Ryan Flynn & Pedro Moutinho (5); All: Ryan Flynn (6)
- Highest home attendance: 7,049 vs. Kilmarnock, 10 February 2010
- Lowest home attendance: 4,321 vs. Motherwell, 27 January 2010
- Average home league attendance: 5,635
Home colours	Away colours

The 2009–10 season was Falkirk's fifth consecutive season in the Scottish Premier League. Falkirk also competed in the League Cup, Scottish Cup and the Europa League. Falkirk finished the season in twelfth place and were relegated to the Scottish First Division after five years in the SPL.

== Summary ==
Falkirk finished as runners-up in the 2009 Scottish Cup Final and qualified for the UEFA Europa League. They entered the second qualifying round of the competition, losing 2–1 on aggregate, after extra-time, to Vaduz, becoming the first British club to lose a European tie to a club from Liechtenstein. Falkirk were relegated to the Scottish First Division for the first time since 2005 after a 0–0 draw with Kilmarnock on the final day of the season. Kilmarnock were also at threat of being relegated and the winner of the match at Rugby Park would have remained in the SPL. Falkirk also reached the third round of the League Cup, the fourth round of the Scottish Cup.

=== Management ===
Falkirk began the season under the management of Eddie May who had been appointed in June 2009 after several years of coaching in the youth set-up at the club. On 11 February 2010, May stepped down from his position, with the club sitting bottom of the SPL. He was succeeded by Steven Pressley, player-coach at the club and was appointed until the end of the season.

== Results ==
Win Draw Loss

=== Scottish Premier League ===
Round	Date	Opponent	Venue	Result	Attendance	Goalscorers	Match Report
1	15 August 2009	Rangers	Ibrox Stadium	1–4	50,239	Finnigan 24'	Match Report
2	22 August 2009	Hibernian	Falkirk Stadium	1–3	6,059	Flynn 25'	Match Report
3	29 August 2009	Dundee United	Tannadice Park	1–2	6,979	Finnbogason 75'	Match Report
4	14 September 2009	Aberdeen	Falkirk Stadium	0–0	4,724		Match Report
5	19 September 2009	Hamilton Academical	New Douglas Park	0–0	2,640		Match Report
6	26 September 2009	Kilmarnock	Falkirk Stadium	0–0	5,394		Match Report
7	3 October 2009	Motherwell	Fir Park	0–1	4,337		Match Report
8	17 October 2009	St Mirren	Falkirk Stadium	1–3	5,084	McLean 55'	Match Report
9	24 October 2009	Heart of Midlothian	Tynecastle Stadium	0–0	14,127		Match Report
10	31 October 2009	St Johnstone	McDiarmid Park	1–3	4,423	Finnigan 49'	Match Report
11	8 November 2009	Celtic	Falkirk Stadium	3–3	6,795	Arfield 61' (Pen), Moutinho 64', Stewart 83'	Match Report
12	21 November 2009	Hamilton Academical	Falkirk Stadium	2–0	5,628	Mitchell 64', Bullen 79'	Match Report
13	28 November 2009	Hibernian	Easter Road	0–2	13,305		Match Report
14	5 December 2009	Rangers	Falkirk Stadium	1–3	6,903	Moutinho 41'	Match Report
15	12 December 2009	St Mirren	New St Mirren Park	1–1	4,033	Finnigan 88'	Match Report
16	19 December 2009	Kilmarnock	Rugby Park	2–1	4,472	Finnigan 3', Flynn 58'	Match Report
17	26 December 2009	Heart of Midlothian	Falkirk Stadium	0–1	6,082		Match Report
18	16 January 2010	Celtic	Celtic Park	1–1	50,000	Finnigan 19'	Match Report
19	24 January 2010	Dundee United	Falkirk Stadium	1–4	4,378	Moutinho 90+1'	Match Report
20	27 January 2010	Motherwell	Falkirk Stadium	0–0	4,321		Match Report
21	30 January 2010	Rangers	Ibrox Stadium	0–3	45,907		Match Report
22	2 February 2010	Aberdeen	Pittodrie	1–0	7,741	Healy 31'	Match Report
23	10 February 2010	Kilmarnock	Falkirk Stadium	0–1	7,049		Match Report
24	13 February 2010	Heart of Midlothian	Tynecastle Stadium	2–3	14,078	Kucharski 45+2' (o.g.), Moutinho 83'	Match Report
25	20 February 2010	Aberdeen	Falkirk Stadium	3–1	4,643	Moutinho 13', Barr 42', Showunmi 70'	Match Report
26	27 February 2010	Dundee United	Tannadice Park	0–3	6,352		Match Report
27	7 March 2010	Celtic	Falkirk Stadium	0–2	6,792		Match Report
28	13 March 2010	St Johnstone	Falkirk Stadium	1–2	5,895	Twaddle 27'	Match Report
29	20 March 2010	Hamilton Academical	New Douglas Park	2–2	2,461	Arfield 26', Flynn 59'	Match Report
30	23 March 2010	St Johnstone	McDiarmid Park	1–1	3,107	Flynn 19'	Match Report
31	27 March 2010	Hibernian	Falkirk Stadium	1–3	5,460	Stewart 19'	Match Report
32	3 April 2010	Motherwell	Fir Park	1–0	4,628	Flynn 27'	Match Report
33	10 April 2010	St Mirren	Falkirk Stadium	2–1	5,671	Moutinho 45+2', Higdon (o.g.) 67'	Match Report
34	17 April 2010	Aberdeen	Pittodrie	0–1	10,461		Match Report
35	24 April 2010	Hamilton Academical	Falkirk Stadium	0–1	5,118		Match Report
36	1 May 2010	St Mirren	Falkirk Stadium	1–1	5,919	Arfield 45' (Pen)	Match Report
37	5 May 2010	St Johnstone	Falkirk Stadium	0–0	5,502		Match Report
38	8 May 2010	Kilmarnock	Rugby Park	0–0	10,662		Match Report

=== Scottish League Cup ===
Round	Date	Opponent	Venue	Result	Attendance	Goalscorers	Match Report
Third round	23 September 2009	Celtic	Falkirk Stadium	0–4	5,669		Match Report

=== Scottish Cup ===
Round	Date	Opponent	Venue	Result	Attendance	Goalscorers	Match Report
Fourth round	18 January 2010	Kilmarnock	Rugby Park	0–1	3,378		Match Report

=== UEFA Europa League ===
Round	Date	Opponent	Venue	Result	Attendance	Goalscorers	Match Report
Second qualifying round	16 July 2009	(Liechtenstein) Vaduz	Falkirk Stadium	1–0	5,763	Flynn 50'	Match Report
Second qualifying round	23 July 2009	(Liechtenstein) Vaduz	Rheinpark Stadion	2–0 (a.e.t)	1,842		Match Report

== Squad statistics ==
=== Player statistics ===
As of 8 May 2010(UTC)

No.	Pos	Nat	Player	Total		Premier League		League Cup		Scottish Cup		Europa League	
No.	Pos	Nat	Player	Apps	Goals	Apps	Goals	Apps	Goals	Apps	Goals	Apps	Goals
1	GK	(Austria) AUT	Bobby Olejnik	42	0	38+0	0	1+0	0	1+0	0	2+0	0
2	DF	(Scotland) SCO	Darren Barr	39	1	35+1	1	1+0	0	0+0	0	2+0	0
3	DF	(Scotland) SCO	Tam Scobbie	23	0	19+1	0	0+1	0	0+0	0	2+0	0
4	DF	(Scotland) SCO	Marc Twaddle	37	1	30+3	1	1+0	0	1+0	0	2+0	0
6	MF	(Northern Ireland) NIR	Brian McLean	40	1	36+0	1	1+0	0	1+0	0	2+0	0
7	MF	(Portugal) POR	Pedro Moutinho	26	5	20+5	5	0+0	0	1+0	0	0+0	0
8	MF	(Scotland) SCO	Burton O'Brien	30	0	23+4	0	0+0	0	0+1	0	2+0	0
9	FW	(England) ENG	Carl Finnigan	30	5	20+7	5	1+0	0	0+0	0	2+0	0
10	MF	(Canada) CAN	Scott Arfield	40	3	35+1	3	1+0	0	1+0	0	2+0	0
11	MF	(Scotland) SCO	Ryan Flynn	40	6	36+0	5	1+0	0	1+0	0	1+1	1
12	FW	(Scotland) SCO	Mark Stewart	20	2	7+12	2	0+1	0	0+0	0	0+0	0
15	FW	(Nigeria) NGA	Enoch Showunmi	21	1	15+6	1	0+0	0	0+0	0	0+0	0
16	FW	(Scotland) SCO	Dayne Robertson	2	0	0+1	0	0+0	0	0+0	0	0+1	0
18	DF	(Scotland) SCO	Brian Allison	4	0	4+0	0	0+0	0	0+0	0	0+0	0
19	MF	(Scotland) SCO	Sean Lynch	9	0	3+5	0	1+0	0	0+0	0	0+0	0
22	MF	(Slovenia) SVN	Danijel Marčeta	17	0	8+7	0	1+0	0	0+1	0	0+0	0
23	MF	(Portugal) POR	Vítor Lima	27	0	22+4	0	0+0	0	1+0	0	0+0	0
24	FW	(Republic of Ireland) IRL	Colin Healy	19	1	17+2	1	0+0	0	0+0	0	0+0	0
25	DF	(Scotland) SCO	Lee Bullen	10	1	0+9	1	0+0	0	1+0	0	0+0	0
26	MF	(Cape Verde) CPV	Pelé	10	1	7+2	1	0+0	0	1+0	0	0+0	0
27	MF	(France) FRA	Toufik Zerara	3	0	3+0	0	0+0	0	0+0	0	0+0	0
28	MF	(Wales) WAL	Jack Compton	14	0	3+10	0	0+0	0	1+0	0	0+0	0
29	GK	(Canada) CAN	Josh Wagenaar	0	0	0+0	0	0+0	0	0+0	0	0+0	0
30	DF	(Scotland) SCO	Kieran Duffie	6	0	5+1	0	0+0	0	0+0	0	0+0	0
31	DF	(Scotland) SCO	Michael Andrews	0	0	0+0	0	0+0	0	0+0	0	0+0	0
35	MF	(Scotland) SCO	Stewart Murdoch	3	0	0+3	0	0+0	0	0+0	0	0+0	0
Players who left the club during the 2009–10 season
4	CM	(Scotland) SCO	Jordyn Felling	2	0	0+0	0	0+0	0	0+0	0	0+2	0
5	DF	(Scotland) SCO	Jackie McNamara	17	0	13+0	0	0+1	0	1+0	0	2+0	0
13	GK	(Scotland) SCO	Jamie Barclay	0	0	0+0	0	0+0	0	0+0	0	0+0	0
14	DF	(Scotland) SCO	Chris Mitchell	11	1	5+3	1	1+0	0	0+0	0	1+1	0
15	FW	(Scotland) SCO	Kevin Moffat	0	0	0+0	0	0+0	0	0+0	0	0+0	0
21	MF	(Scotland) SCO	Alex MacDonald	13	0	4+7	0	0+0	0	0+0	0	2+0	0
24	FW	(Iceland) ISL	Kjartan Finnbogason	7	1	7+0	1	0+0	0	0+0	0	0+0	0

== League table ==
Pos	Team	Pld	W	D	L	GF	GA	GD	Pts	Qualification or relegation
8	St Johnstone	38	12	11	15	57	61	−4	47	
9	Aberdeen	38	10	11	17	36	52	−16	41	
10	St Mirren	38	7	13	18	36	49	−13	34	
11	Kilmarnock	38	8	9	21	29	51	−22	33	
12	Falkirk (R)	38	6	13	19	31	57	−26	31	Relegation to the First Division

Source: SPFL Archive
Rules for classification: 1) points; 2) goal difference; 3) number of goals scored.
(R) Relegated

== Transfers ==
=== Players in ===
Player	From	Fee
(Northern Ireland) Brian McLean	(Scotland) Motherwell	Free
(Scotland) Marc Twaddle	(Scotland) Partick Thistle	Undisclosed
(Scotland) Ryan Flynn	(England) Liverpool	Loan
(Scotland) Alex MacDonald	(England) Burnley	Loan
(Slovenia) Danijel Marčeta	(Serbia) Partizan Belgrade	Loan
(Portugal) Vítor Lima	(Greece) Ethnikos Piraeus	Free
(Canada) Josh Wagenaar	(England) Yeovil Town	Free
(Iceland) Kjartan Finnbogason	(Norway) Sandefjord	Loan
(Scotland) Ryan Flynn	(England) Liverpool	Free
(Portugal) Pedro Moutinho	(Portugal) Marítimo	Free
(Cape Verde) Pelé	(England) West Bromwich Albion	Free
(France) Toufik Zerara	(United Arab Emirates) Al Dhafra	Free
(Wales) Jack Compton	(England) Weston-super-Mare	Undisclosed
(Republic of Ireland) Colin Healy	(England) Ipswich Town	Loan
(Nigeria) Enoch Showunmi	(England) Leeds United	Free

=== Players out ===
Player	To	Fee
(England) Michael Higdon	(Scotland) St Mirren	Free
(England) Dean Holden	(England) Shrewsbury Town	Free
(Republic of Ireland) Patrick Cregg	(Scotland) Hibernian	Free
(Scotland) Kevin McBride	(Scotland) Hibernian	Free
(Scotland) Paul McLean	(Scotland) Brechin City	Free
(Scotland) Mark Staunton	(Scotland) East Fife	Free
(Scotland) Jay Lang	(Scotland) Clyde	Free
(Scotland) Jamie Barclay	(Scotland) East Stirlingshire	Loan
(Northern Ireland) Dermot McCaffrey	(Scotland) Arbroath	Loan
(England) Steve Lovell	(Scotland) Partick Thistle	Free
(Scotland) Paul Sludden	(Scotland) East Fife	Loan
(Scotland) Kevin Moffat	Free Agent	Free
(Wales) James Bloom	(Scotland) Alloa Athletic	Loan
(Scotland) Chris Mitchell	(Scotland) Ayr United	Loan
(Scotland) Jackie McNamara	(Scotland) Partick Thistle	Loan
