= Mark O'Hara =

Scottish footballer

Personal information
- Full name: Mark Ryan O'Hara
- Date of birth: 12 December 1995 (age 30)
- Place of birth: Barrhead, Scotland
- Height: 1.91 m (6 ft 3 in)
- Position: Central midfielder

Team information
- Current team: Kilmarnock
- Number: 5

Youth career
- Barrhead Boys Club
- Kilmarnock

Senior career*
| Years | Team | Apps | (Gls) |
| 2012–2016 | Kilmarnock | 78 | (0) |
| 2016–2018 | Dundee | 60 | (9) |
| 2018–2020 | Peterborough United | 22 | (4) |
| 2019 | → Lincoln City (loan) | 17 | (1) |
| 2019–2020 | → Motherwell (loan) | 17 | (1) |
| 2020–2022 | Motherwell | 46 | (6) |
| 2022–2026 | St Mirren | 118 | (20) |
| 2026– | Kilmarnock | 0 | (0) |

International career
| 2013 | Scotland U19 | 9 | (0) |
| 2015–2016 | Scotland U21 | 2 | (0) |
- * Club domestic league appearances and goals as of 20 May 2026

Mark Ryan O'Hara (born 12 December 1995) is a Scottish professional footballer who plays as a central midfielder for Kilmarnock. He has previously played for Dundee, Peterborough United, Lincoln City, Motherwell & St Mirren.

== Club career ==
=== Kilmarnock ===
A member of Kilmarnock's under-20 squad O'Hara made his first team debut on 28 August 2012, coming on as a 13th-minute substitute in a Scottish League Cup match against Stenhousemuir, replacing the injured Jeroen Tesselaar in a 2–1 defeat. Aged just 16 on his debut, O'Hara became the fifth youngest person to play competitively for Kilmarnock and only the second youngest in that competition. On 27 October 2012, he made his first start and league debut in a 2–0 win over Celtic at Celtic Park, Kilmarnock's first win at the venue since 1955.

=== Dundee ===
O'Hara signed for Dundee in June 2016. Upon signing for Dundee, he was moved into an attacking midfield position by manager Paul Hartley, who said he didn't know why O'Hara had previously been playing as a defender. On 13 August 2016, he scored his first career goal, in Dundee's 2–1 defeat against Rangers. He then scored again in the following match, getting the equaliser in a 1–1 draw against Hamilton Academical.

On the 19th of February 2017, he scored the opening goal as Dundee won 2–1 against Rangers, the first time since 1992 that Dundee had beaten them at home in the league. Following Paul Hartley's departure from Dundee, O'Hara scored in new manager Neil McCann's first match in charge, a 3–2 win against Motherwell.

O'Hara scored an equalising goal in a 1–1 draw in the Dundee derby against Dundee United in the Scottish league cup group stage. He scored again against Rangers, getting both goals in a 2–1 home win on 24 November 2017, this was O'Hara's fourth goal against Rangers in his third home game against them.

=== Peterborough United ===
O'Hara moved to Peterborough United in May 2018 under freedom of contract, with Dundee receiving a compensation fee.

He started his career at London Road in goalscoring form, netting three goals in his first two games in League One against Bristol Rovers and Rochdale. Fourteen starts and eight sub appearances followed in the first half of the 2018–19 season, but the end of manager Steve Evans' tenure at the club coincided with a loan move to League Two side Lincoln City.

His aggressive and tenacious midfield style saw him make an instant impact with the Imps, making 17 appearances as Danny Cowley's side won the league title by six points over Bury and MK Dons.

He was transfer-listed by Peterborough United at the end of the 2018–19 season.

On 2 September 2019, O'Hara joined Motherwell on loan for the remainder of the 2019–20 season.

=== Motherwell ===
On 24 June 2020, Motherwell announced the signing of O'Hara on a permanent deal from Peterborough United for a nominal fee, signing a two-year contract.

=== St Mirren ===
In May 2022 following the expiry of his Motherwell contract, O'Hara signed for fellow Scottish Premiership side St Mirren on a two-year deal, having previously signed a pre-contract agreement with the Buddies in March.

In March 2023, O'Hara extended his contract until the summer of 2026 after establishing himself as a regular in the Saints team. He was released from his contract on expiry in 2026.

=== Kilmarnock ===
In 2026, O’Hara returned to his Academy Club, Kilmarnock FC as their number 5. He signed a 2 year deal after deciding against renewing his contract with the Saints in Paisley.

== International career ==
O'Hara represented Scotland at the under-19 and under-21 levels.

== Career statistics ==
As of 4 May 2024

| Club | Season | League | | | National Cup | | League Cup | | Other | | Total | |
| Club | Season | Division | Apps | Goals | Apps | Goals | Apps | Goals | Apps | Goals | Apps | Goals |
|---|---|---|---|---|---|---|---|---|---|---|---|---|
| Kilmarnock | 2012–13 | Scottish Premier League | 17 | 0 | 2 | 0 | 1 | 0 | — | | 20 | 0 |
| Kilmarnock | 2013–14 | Scottish Premiership | 14 | 0 | 1 | 0 | 1 | 0 | — | | 16 | 0 |
| Kilmarnock | 2014–15 | Scottish Premiership | 18 | 0 | 0 | 0 | 0 | 0 | — | | 18 | 0 |
| Kilmarnock | 2015–16 | Scottish Premiership | 29 | 0 | 1 | 0 | 2 | 0 | 2 (Note: Appearances in the Premiership play-offs) | 0 | 34 | 0 |
| Kilmarnock | Total | | 78 | 0 | 4 | 0 | 4 | 0 | 2 | 0 | 88 | 0 |
| Dundee | 2016–17 | Scottish Premiership | 28 | 5 | 1 | 0 | 3 | 0 | — | | 32 | 5 |
| Dundee | 2017–18 | Scottish Premiership | 32 | 4 | 3 | 1 | 4 | 1 | — | | 39 | 6 |
| Dundee | Total | | 60 | 9 | 4 | 1 | 7 | 1 | 0 | 0 | 71 | 11 |
| Peterborough United | 2018–19 | EFL League One | 22 | 4 | 0 | 0 | 1 | 0 | 2 | 0 | 25 | 4 |
| Peterborough United | 2019–20 | EFL League One | 0 | 0 | 0 | 0 | 0 | 0 | 0 | 0 | 0 | 0 |
| Peterborough United | Total | | 22 | 4 | 0 | 0 | 1 | 0 | 2 (Note: Appearances in the EFL Trophy) | 0 | 25 | 4 |
| Lincoln City (loan) | 2018–19 | EFL League Two | 17 | 1 | 0 | 0 | 0 | 0 | 0 | 0 | 17 | 1 |
| Motherwell (loan) | 2019–20 | Scottish Premiership | 17 | 1 | 3 | 1 | 0 | 0 | — | | 20 | 2 |
| Motherwell | 2020–21 | Scottish Premiership | 27 | 5 | 2 | 0 | 1 | 0 | 3 (Note: Appearances in the UEFA Europa League) | 0 | 33 | 5 |
| Motherwell | 2021–22 | Scottish Premiership | 19 | 1 | 1 | 0 | 1 | 0 | — | | 21 | 1 |
| Motherwell | Total | | 46 | 6 | 3 | 0 | 2 | 0 | 3 | 0 | 54 | 6 |
| St Mirren | 2022–23 | Scottish Premiership | 35 | 10 | 2 | 1 | 4 | 1 | — | | 41 | 12 |
| St Mirren | 2023–24 | Scottish Premiership | 25 | 4 | 0 | 0 | 4 | 2 | — | | 29 | 6 |
| St Mirren | Total | | 60 | 14 | 2 | 1 | 8 | 3 | 0 | 0 | 70 | 18 |
| Career total | | | 300 | 35 | 16 | 3 | 22 | 4 | 7 | 0 | 345 | 42 |

== Honours ==
Lincoln City

- EFL League Two: 2018–19

St Mirren

- Scottish League Cup: 2025–26
