= Toyosi Olusanya =

English footballer

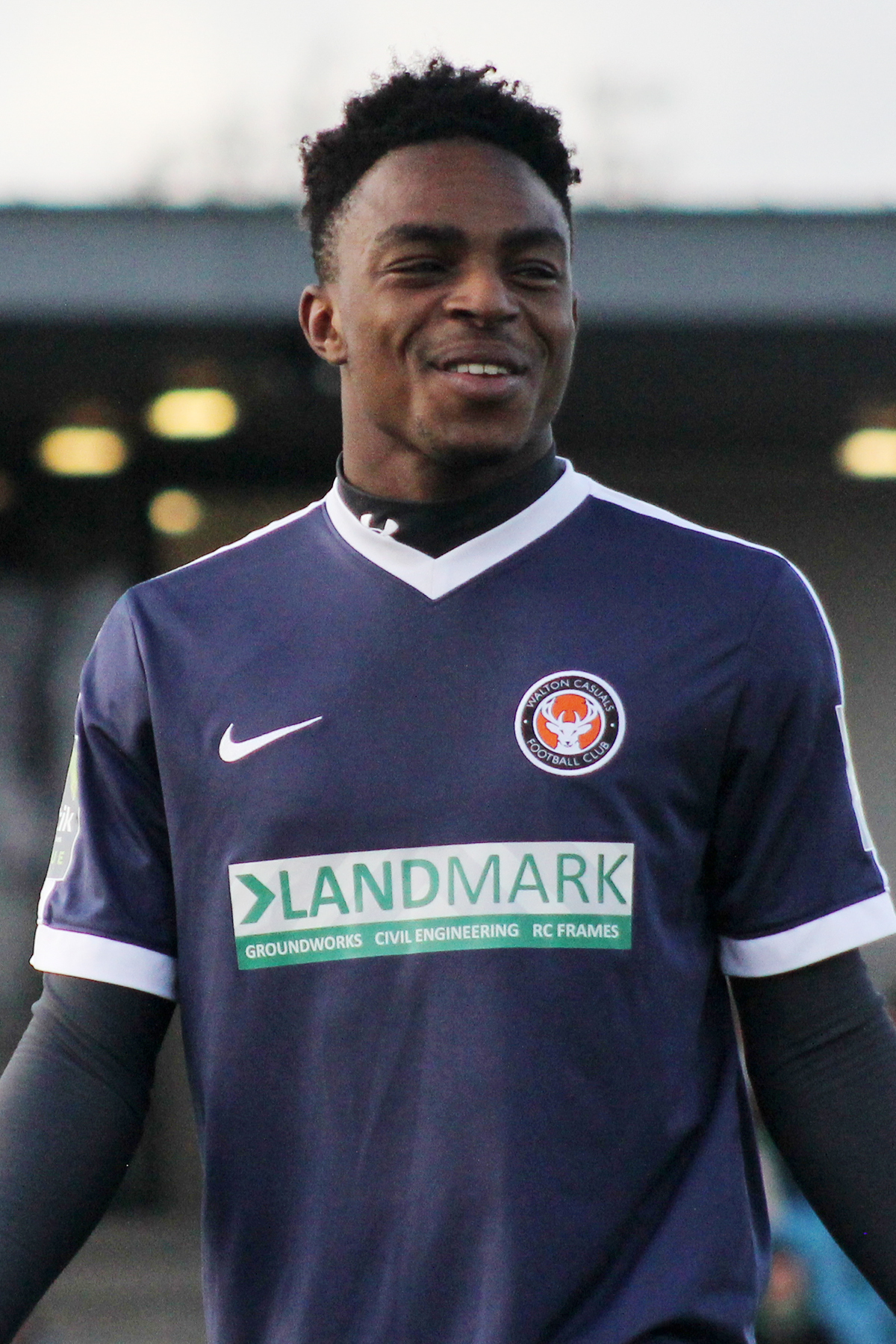
- Olusanya playing for Walton Casuals in December 2017

Personal information
- Full name: Olutoyosi Tajudeen Oludamilola Olusanya
- Date of birth: 14 October 1997 (age 29)
- Place of birth: Lambeth, England
- Height: 5 ft 9 in (1.75 m)
- Position: Forward

Team information
- Current team: Aberdeen
- Number: 20

Youth career
- 2008–2011: Mass
- 2011–2012: Palace Guard
- 2012–2015: 10 Coaching
- 2015–2016: AFC Wimbledon

Senior career*
Years	Team	Apps	(Gls)
2016–2017	AFC Wimbledon	1	(1)
2016	→ Kingstonian (loan)	4	(0)
2017–2018	Walton Casuals	6	(1)
2018	Fleet Town	8	(2)
2018–2019	Gosport Borough	8	(0)
2019–2020	Cheshunt	9	(0)
2020–2021	Billericay Town	7	(1)
2021–2022	Middlesbrough	3	(0)
2022–2025	St Mirren	67	(14)
2023	→ Arbroath (loan)	9	(1)
2025–2026	Houston Dynamo	6	(0)
2025–2026	→ Doncaster Rovers (loan)	7	(0)
2026	→ Aberdeen (loan)	16	(2)
2026–	Aberdeen	0	(0)
- * Club domestic league appearances and goals as of 20 May 2026

Olutoyosi Tajudeen Oludamilola Olusanya (born 14 October 1997), known as Toyosi Olusanya, is an English footballer who plays as a forward for Scottish Premiership club Aberdeen.

He started his professional career at AFC Wimbledon and scored on his debut. After a loan spell at Kingstonian in late 2016, Olusanya trialled with Chelsea, Reading, Wolverhampton Wanderers and Cheltenham Town before joining Walton Casuals. He joined Fleet Town in February 2018 before a move to Gosport Borough a month later.

== Club career ==
=== Youth ===
Olusanya started his youth career with Mass between the ages of 11 and 14, before a year-long spell at Palace Guard. He later joined 10 Coaching as part of a college scheme, and was spotted by AFC Wimbledon while looking at a teammate.

=== AFC Wimbledon ===
In 2015, Olusanya joined AFC Wimbledon. He was a key member of the club's 2015–16 FA Youth Cup run that saw them reach the fifth Round.

Having featured in a 4–0 victory over Woking in the first round, he netted both goals in the club's 2–0 victory over Ebbsfleet United in the second round. Olusanya also played against Watford, Newcastle United and Chelsea in the ensuing rounds. He was rewarded with a professional deal in February 2016.

On 7 May 2016, he made his Football League debut as a 73rd minute substitute against Newport County. Olusanya scored his first goal for the club seven minutes later, being bought down in the box before converting the penalty. With the game ending 1-0, Olusanya managed to secure the win for the Dons

==== Kingstonian (loan) ====
In November 2016, he joined Isthmian League Premier Division club Kingstonian on a one-month loan. He made his debut in a 1–1 FA Trophy draw with Tonbridge Angels on 12 November, and marked his league debut a week later. He made seven appearances for the club, the majority coming from the bench, before his return to AFC Wimbledon in December.

==== Trials ====
In April 2017, Olusanya joined Premier League side Chelsea on trial, having impressed in their previous FA Youth Cup meeting. Reports suggested Manchester City also took an interest in the forward after his cup performances.

In July 2017, Olusanya was listed as a member of the Reading Under-23 squad. A month later he joined Wolverhampton Wanderers on trial. In October 2017, he joined Cheltenham Town on trial.

=== Walton Casuals ===
On 2 December 2017, he joined Isthmian League South Division club Walton Casuals with the club out of striking options due to injuries. He made his debut in the same day in a league fixture at South Park. On 5 December, he scored his first goal for the club in a 3–0 victory against Sittingbourne. He made a further five appearances for the club before falling out of favour.

=== Fleet Town ===
In February 2018, Olusanya joined Southern League Division One East club Fleet Town. On 3 February, he made his debut in a 3–2 defeat at Uxbridge. Olusanya scored his first goal for the club in an 8–1 North Hants Cup win against Tadley Calleva Reserves on 20 February. Two weeks later, he scored his first league goal in defeat to Ashford Town and was named Man of the Match. Olusanya also scored on his final appearance for the club in a 4–2 victory against Thame United on 17 March.

=== Gosport Borough ===
On 23 March 2018, Olusanya joined Southern League Premier Division club Gosport Borough. He made his début for Gosport as a second-half substitute in a 5–1 defeat at Hereford the following day.

=== Billericay Town FC ===
Prior to joining Middlesbrough for an undisclosed fee, Olusanya had an amazing pre season with National league side Billericay Town, where he managed to score 8 goals in 3 games. He scored a hat-trick in a 4-1 win against Canvey Island, followed by a second hat-trick in a 5-0 win against Needham Market.

=== Middlesbrough ===
Olusanya joined Championship club Middlesbrough in August 2021. On 25 August 2021, he made his debut in the 1–1 draw against Blackburn Rovers at the Riverside Stadium, coming on from the bench after 67 minutes. He featured regularly for the Under 23s before being out of action for four months due to a broken metatarsal.

=== St Mirren ===
On 17 June 2022, Olusanya joined Scottish Premiership club St Mirren on a two-year deal.

On 25 January 2023, he joined Scottish Championship club Arbroath on loan until the end of the season. On 1 March 2024, it was confirmed that Olusanya had signed a one-year extension on his contract.

=== Houston Dynamo ===
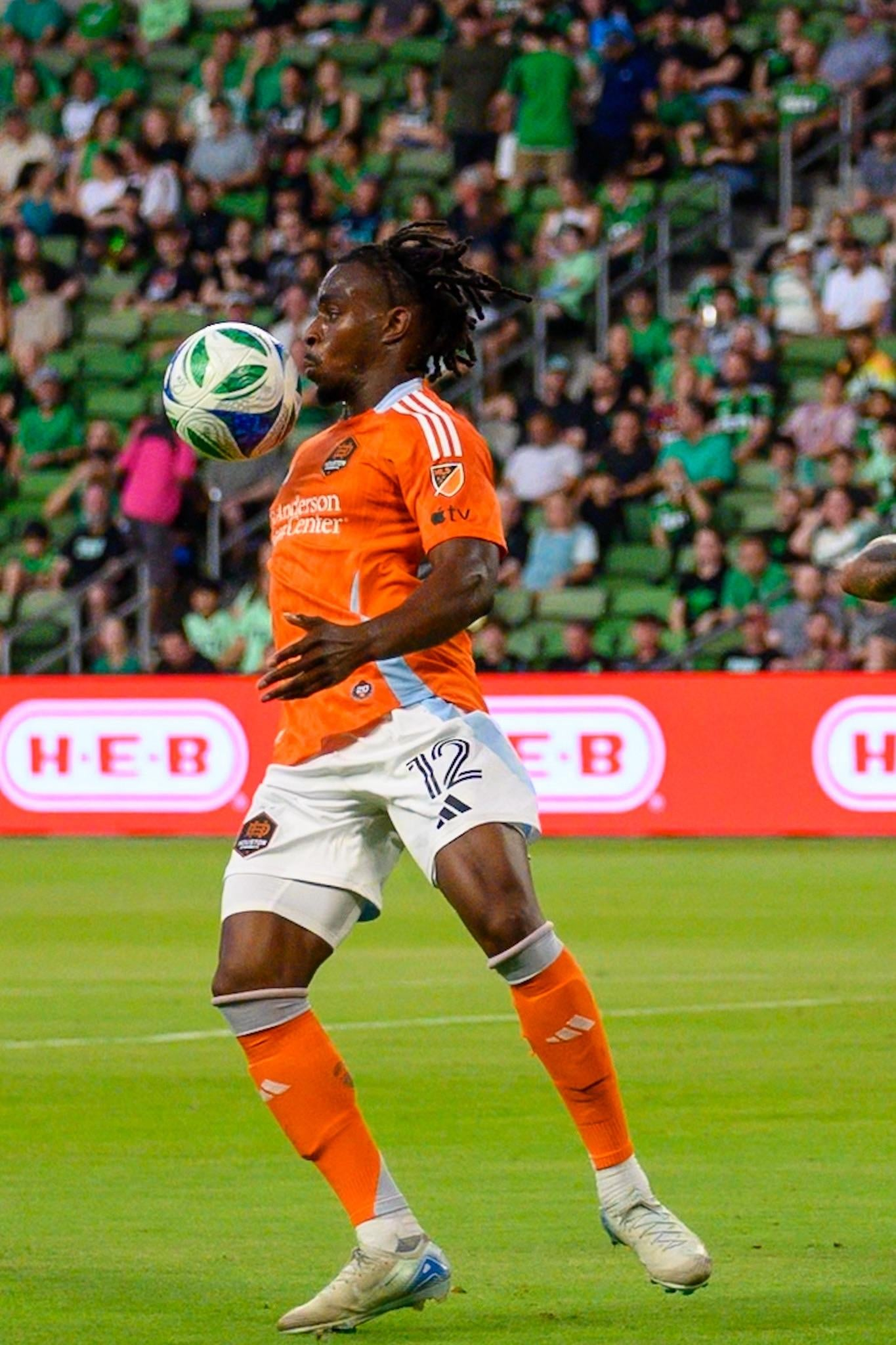
Olusanya in 2025.

On 23 April 2025, Olusanya signed for Major League Soccer side Houston Dynamo for an undisclosed six-figure fee, signing a contract until June 2026 with the option to extend for a further two years.

==== Loans to Doncaster Rovers and Aberdeen ====
On 30 August 2025, Olusanya joined League One club Doncaster Rovers on loan until 6 January 2026. Olusanya was again sent out on loan on 23 January 2026, returning to the Scottish Premiership to join Aberdeen.

== Personal life ==
Born in England, Olusanya is of Nigerian descent.

== Career statistics ==
As of match played 1 November 2025

Club	Season	League			National cup (Note: Includes Scottish Cup, U.S. Open Cup, FA Cup)		League cup (Note: Includes Scottish League Cup, EFL Cup)		Continental		Other		Total	
Club	Season	Division	Apps	Goals	Apps	Goals	Apps	Goals	Apps	Goals	Apps	Goals	Apps	Goals
AFC Wimbledon	2015–16	League Two	1	1	0	0	0	0	—		0	0	1	1
AFC Wimbledon	2016–17	League One	0	0	0	0	0	0	—		0	0	0	0
AFC Wimbledon	Total		1	1	0	0	0	0	0	0	0	0	1	1
Kingstonian (loan)	2016–17	Isthmian League Premier Division	4	0	0	0	—		—		3 (Note: Appearances in FA Trophy)	0	7	0
Walton Casuals	2017–18	Isthmian League South Division	6	1	0	0	—		—		—		6	1
Fleet Town	2017–18	Southern League Division One East	8	2	0	0	—		—		1 (Note: Appearance in North Hants Cup)	1	9	3
Gosport Borough	2017–18	Southern League Premier Division	8	0	0	0	—		—		—		8	0
Billericay Town	2020–21	National League South	7	1	0	0	—		—		1	0	8	1
Middlesbrough	2021–22	Championship	3	0	0	0	0	0	—		—		3	0
St Mirren	2022–23	Scottish Premiership	1	0	0	0	4	0	—		—		5	0
St Mirren	2023–24	Scottish Premiership	35	6	1	0	6	1	—		—		42	7
St Mirren	2024–25	Scottish Premiership	16	8	2	2	1	0	4 (Note: Appearances in UEFA Conference League)	2	—		38	12
St Mirren	Total		67	14	3	2	11	1	4	2	0	0	85	19
Arbroath (loan)	2022–23	Scottish Championship	9	1	—		—		—		—		9	1
Houston Dynamo	2025	Major League Soccer	6	0	0	0	—		—		—		6	0
Doncaster Rovers (loan)	2025–26	League One	7	0	1	0	1	0	—		2 (Note: Appearances in EFL Trophy)	0	11	0
Aberdeen (loan)	2025–26	Scottish Premiership	0	0	0	0	0	0	0	0	0	0	0	0
Career total			126	20	4	2	12	1	4	2	7	1	153	26
