= Dylan Reid =

Scottish footballer

Personal information
- Date of birth: 1 March 2005 (age 21)
- Place of birth: Kilbirnie, Scotland
- Position: Midfielder

Team information
- Current team: Arbroath
- Number: 17

Youth career
- –2021: St Mirren
- 2023–2024: Crystal Palace

Senior career*
Years	Team	Apps	(Gls)
2021–2023	St Mirren	6	(0)
2022	→ Queen's Park (loan)	2	(0)
2024–2026	Crystal Palace	0	(0)
2026–	Arbroath	3	(0)

International career^{‡}
2019	Scotland U16	4	(0)
2021–2022	Scotland U17	12	(0)
2022–2023	Scotland U18	5	(0)
2022	Scotland U19	3	(0)
- * Club domestic league appearances and goals as of 23:37, 17 October 2026 (UTC) ‡ National team caps and goals as of 21 November 2023 (UTC)

Dylan Reid (born 1 March 2005) is a Scottish professional footballer who plays as a midfielder for Scottish Championship side Arbroath. He was the youngest player in St Mirren's history to make a competitive appearance.

== Club career ==
=== St Mirren ===
Reid made his professional debut for St Mirren aged 16 years and six days, coming off the bench in the 88th minute of a 3–0 Scottish Premiership defeat against Rangers. He became the youngest debutant in St Mirren's history. Shortly after this, Reid reportedly attracted interest from Bundesliga giants Bayern Munich who were interested in signing him for their academy and had brought him over to visit their facilities. However, Reid declined the offer and decided to stay at St Mirren. He also garnered interest earlier in his youth career from Primeira Liga side Benfica and had a trial period with them.

In March 2021, Reid signed a new contract with St Mirren lasting until summer 2023. In April 2021, it was announced that he would miss two weeks of action to focus on school work. He made his first career start in September 2021, during a 0-0 draw with Dundee United. Following the game, St Mirren manager Jim Goodwin praised Reid but said he lacked physicality and needed to "put more weight on."

Reid did not appear in another first team game until December 2021, when he was recalled to the squad for a game against Celtic due to a COVID-19 outbreak in the squad. He played the full game, which ended in a goalless draw, in central midfield. He was then loaned to Queen's Park in February 2022.

In July 2022, Reid rejected a contract offer from Celtic after St Mirren accepted a bid of £125,000 for the player. According to St Mirren manager Stephen Robinson, he was earmarked as a development signing for Celtic B but chose to remain at the club as he "backed himself" to break into the first-team at St Mirren.

=== Crystal Palace ===
In February 2023, Reid moved to Crystal Palace for an undisclosed fee to join their Academy squad.

=== Arbroath ===
On 30 September 2026, Reid signed for Scottish Championship side Arbroath.

== International career ==
After previously representing the Scotland national under-16 football team in 2019, Reid was called up for the under-17s in September 2021, and captained the team against Wales. Reid has since also won caps for the Scottish under-18 and under-19 teams.

== Career statistics ==
As of match played 8 October 2022

Appearances and goals by club, season and competition
Club	Season	League			National cup (Note: Includes Scottish Cup and FA Cup)		League cup (Note: Includes Scottish League Cup and EFL Cup)		Other		Total	
Club	Season	Division	Apps	Goals	Apps	Goals	Apps	Goals	Apps	Goals	Apps	Goals
St Mirren	2020–21	Scottish Premiership	1	0	0	0	0	0	0	0	1	0
St Mirren	2021–22	Scottish Premiership	3	0	0	0	0	0	0	0	3	0
Queen's Park (loan)	2021–22	Scottish League One	2	0	0	0	0	0	0	0	2	0
St Mirren	2022–23	Scottish Premiership	2	0	0	0	0	0	0	0	2	0
Career total			8	0	0	0	0	0	0	0	8	0
