= Zach Hemming =

English footballer (born 2000)

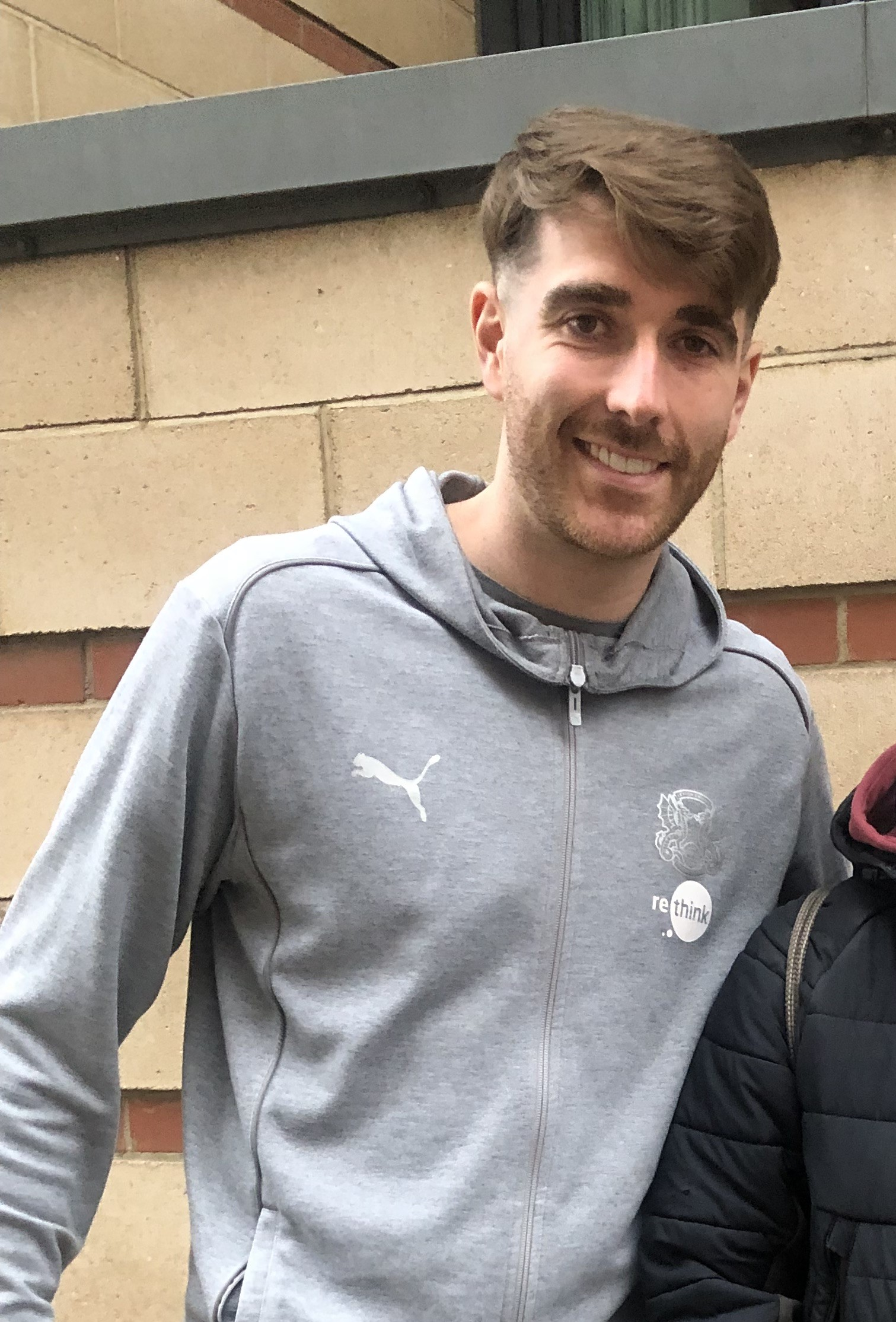
- Zech Hemming in 2024.

Personal information
- Full name: Zachary Hemming
- Date of birth: 7 March 2000 (age 26)
- Place of birth: Bishop Auckland, England
- Height: 1.90 m (6 ft 3 in)
- Position: Goalkeeper

Team information
- Current team: Chesterfield
- Number: 1

Youth career
- 2010–2018: Middlesbrough

Senior career*
Years	Team	Apps	(Gls)
2018–2025	Middlesbrough	0	(0)
2018–2019	→ Darlington (loan)	3	(0)
2019	→ Hartlepool United (loan)	0	(0)
2020–2021	→ Blyth Spartans (loan)	16	(0)
2021–2023	→ Kilmarnock (loan)	46	(0)
2023–2024	→ St Mirren (loan)	38	(0)
2024–2025	→ Leyton Orient (loan)	10	(0)
2025	→ St Mirren (loan)	17	(0)
2025–	Chesterfield	38	(0)
- * Club domestic league appearances and goals as of 7 April 2026

Zachary Hemming (born 7 March 2000) is an English professional footballer who plays as a goalkeeper for League Two club Chesterfield.

== Early life ==
Born in Bishop Auckland, Hemming attended St John's Catholic School.

== Career ==
=== Non-League loans ===
Hemming joined Darlington on a month's loan from Middlesbrough in October 2018, and made his debut in a 2–2 away draw at Bradford Park Avenue. He then kept a clean sheet in a 0–0 home draw with Guiseley. The following season he joined Hartlepool United on loan but was recalled without making an appearance. In November 2019 he joined Blyth Spartans on loan, making his debut that month in the FA Trophy against Alfreton Town.

=== Kilmarnock ===
Hemming joined Kilmarnock on a season-long loan in June 2021. He conceded only one goal in the first month of the season and won Kilmarnock's Player of the Month award for August. Hemming helped Kilmarnock achieve promotion as champions to the Scottish Premiership during the 2021–22 season. He kept 15 clean sheets in 36 appearances and was named Kilmarnock's Young Player of the Year. He was also selected in the Scottish Championship's PFA Team of the Season.

In June 2022 Hemming rejoined Kilmarnock on loan for the 2022–23 season.

=== Loan to St Mirren ===
Hemming joined St Mirren on a season-long loan in June 2023.

=== Chesterfield ===
On 20 June 2025, Hemming agreed to join League Two side Chesterfield on a three-year contract.

== Personal life ==
Hemming has one child with his partner and a step-son.

== Career statistics ==
As of match played 8 October 2024

Appearances and goals by club, season and competition
Club	Season	League			National Cup (Note: Includes FA Cup, Scottish Cup)		League Cup (Note: Includes EFL Cup, Scottish League Cup)		Other		Total	
Club	Season	Division	Apps	Goals	Apps	Goals	Apps	Goals	Apps	Goals	Apps	Goals
Middlesbrough U23	2016–17	—			—		—		0	0	0	0
Middlesbrough U23	2017–18	—			—		—		2 (Note: Appearance(s) in EFL Trophy)	0	2	0
Middlesbrough U23	2018–19	—			—		—		1	0	1	0
Middlesbrough U23	Total		—		—		—		3	0	3	0
Darlington (loan)	2018–19	National League North	3	0	0	0	—		0	0	3	0
Hartlepool United (loan)	2019–20	National League	0	0	0	0	—		0	0	0	0
Blyth Spartans (loan)	2019–20	National League North	16	0	0	0	—		1 (Note: Appearance(s) in FA Trophy)	0	17	0
Kilmarnock (loan)	2021–22	Scottish Championship	36	0	1	0	2	0	0	0	39	0
Kilmarnock (loan)	2022–23	Scottish Premiership	10	0	1	0	4	0	—		15	0
Kilmarnock (loan)	Total		46	0	2	0	6	0	0	0	54	0
St Mirren (loan)	2023–24	Scottish Premiership	38	0	2	0	6	0	—		46	0
Leyton Orient (loan)	2024–25	League One	10	0	0	0	2	0	1	0	13	0
Career total			113	0	4	0	14	0	5	0	136	0

== Honours ==
Kilmarnock

- Scottish Championship: 2021–22
