= Ryan Flynn (footballer) =

Scottish footballer

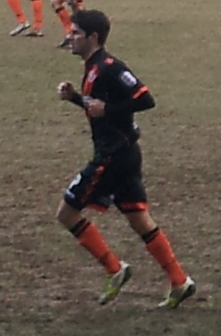
- Flynn playing for Sheffield United in 2013

Personal information
- Full name: Ryan Flynn
- Date of birth: 4 September 1988 (age 38)
- Place of birth: Edinburgh, Scotland
- Height: 5 ft 7 in (1.71 m)
- Position: Midfielder

Team information
- Current team: Arbroath
- Number: 8

Youth career
- Falkirk

Senior career*
Years	Team	Apps	(Gls)
2005–2009	Liverpool	0	(0)
2007	→ Hereford United (loan)	0	(0)
2008–2009	→ Wrexham (loan)	27	(4)
2009–2011	Falkirk	69	(10)
2011–2016	Sheffield United	153	(13)
2016–2018	Oldham Athletic	44	(1)
2018–2024	St Mirren	176	(2)
2024–	Arbroath	61	(1)

International career^{‡}
2007–2009	Scotland U19	3	(0)
- * Club domestic league appearances and goals as of 4 May 2026 ‡ National team caps and goals as of 06:38, 15 July 2011 (UTC)

Ryan Flynn (born 4 September 1988) is a Scottish footballer who plays as a midfielder for Scottish Championship club Arbroath. Born in Edinburgh, he started his career with Liverpool before spells at Wrexham, Falkirk, Sheffield United and Oldham Athletic. He has also represented Scotland at under-19 level.

== Career ==
=== Liverpool ===
Flynn began his career as a junior player with Falkirk, but signed for Liverpool in 2005 for £50,000. Flynn helped Liverpool win successive FA Youth Cup victories in the 2005–06 and 2006–07 seasons, scoring the winner in front of the Kop against Manchester City in the 2006 final and scoring in the penalty shoot-out at Old Trafford (Stretford End) against Manchester United in the 2007 final. In his third season at the club, he helped them win the Northern Premier Reserve League Title, in the 2007–08 season. In November 2007, Flynn joined League Two club Hereford United on a month's loan, although failed to make an appearance. Flynn was loaned to Conference National club Wrexham for the latter part of the 2008–09 season. In all, Flynn scored four goals in 25 league appearances for Wrexham.

=== Falkirk ===
Flynn was then loaned back to his first club, Falkirk, for the 2009–10 season. He made his Falkirk début in a UEFA Europa League tie against FC Vaduz, and Flynn scored the only goal of the game, becoming the first Falkirk player to score a goal in European competition. In mid September it was announced that his move had been made permanent and he signed a three-year contract with Falkirk. Flynn won the Scottish Premier League award for Young Player of the Month for March 2010, having scored six goals in 33 games for Falkirk. He also won the Young Player of the Round award in the second round of the 2010–11 Scottish League Cup, in which he scored the only goal to put Falkirk through against Partick Thistle In the third round of the same cup he was part of the Falkirk team that were voted 'Team of the round', a game in which he scored the third goal against Hearts and which ended up 4–3 to Falkirk.

=== Sheffield United ===
On 14 July 2011, Flynn signed for Sheffield United for an undisclosed fee on a three-year deal.

He made his competitive club début on the first day of the 2011–12 season, starting the Football League match against Oldham Athletic. During his first season at Bramall Lane Flynn established himself as first team player despite competing with the likes of Republic of Ireland International Stephen Quinn for a place in the starting eleven. He finished the campaign having made thirty five appearances and scored three goals. This campaign ended with United finishing 3rd in League One and making the Play Off final. Flynn started in this game as United lost on penalties to Huddersfield at Wembley.

In season 2012–13 Flynn appeared 44 times for the Blades scoring three goals as the side again made the play offs in League One. In 2013–14 Sheffield United embarked on a memorable FA Cup campaign which culminated in them reaching the Semi-Final at Wembley in which they lost 5–3 to Hull City. Flynn starred for the side throughout the campaign, scoring the winning goal against Premier League side Aston Villa at Villa Park and also scoring as they beat Championship side Charlton.

In May 2014, Flynn signed an extension to his contract for a further two-year with the option of a third year.

In 2014–15 Flynn and Sheffield United went on another famous cup run, this time making the semi-final of the League Cup. They beat West Ham at Upton Park as well as Southampton at Bramall Lane en route to the Semi Final where they met Spurs and lost narrowly 3–2 on aggregate. Flynn showed his versatility by starting both games against Spurs at right back and performing impressively. The season ended once more with United making the League One Play Offs only to lose to Swindon Town 7–6 on aggregate.

=== Oldham Athletic ===
On 13 July 2016, Flynn signed a two-year deal with League One side Oldham Athletic. He scored his first goal for Oldham in a 2–1 EFL Cup win against Wigan Athletic on 9 August 2016. He was released by Oldham in January 2018.

=== St Mirren ===
On 15 January 2018, Flynn joined St Mirren on a two-and-a-half-year deal and helped the club secure the Scottish Championship title and promotion in May 2018. Season 2018-19 saw St Mirren, with Flynn as a key player, stay in the Premier League thanks to a memorable end of season run and win over Dundee United in the Premiership Play off.

Flynn suffered cruciate ligament damage on 5 February 2020 in a match against Hamilton Academicals, which effectively ended his season.

Flynn signed a new one-year contract in June 2020, after becoming an integral part of the Saints squad and a firm fans favourite. Flynn's contract was extended for a further year in 2021 after a successful return to full fitness in November 2020. In November 2021, Flynn played his 100th game for St Mirren and was praised by Manager Jim Goodwin for being a real model professional who could play in a number of positions and always perform.

Following Goodwin's departure, Flynn has become a key part of Stephen Robinson's squad. The pair worked together at Oldham and has led to Flynn taking the first steps towards coaching while playing his part for a St Mirren side which secured a top 6 place in 2022–23. Flynn's versatility and experience remained a key component in the St Mirren squad.

=== Arbroath ===
On 30 August 2024, Flynn signed with Arbroath in the third-tier Scottish League One.

== Career statistics ==
As of match played 13 May 2023

Appearances and goals by club, season and competition
Club	Season	League			FA Cup		League Cup		Other		Total	
Club	Season	Division	Apps	Goals	Apps	Goals	Apps	Goals	Apps	Goals	Apps	Goals
Liverpool	2005–06	Premier League	0	0	0	0	0	0	0	0	0	0
Hereford United (loan)	2007–08	League Two	0	0	0	0	0	0	0	0	0	0
Wrexham (loan)	2008–09	Conference Premier	25	4	0	0	—	—	2 (Note: Appearances in the FA Vase)	0	27	4
Liverpool	2009–10	Premier League	0	0	0	0	0	0	0	0	0	0
Falkirk (loan)	2009–10	Scottish Premier League	36	5	1	0	1	0	1 (Note: Appearance in the Europa League)	1	39	6
Falkirk	2010–11	Scottish Premier League	33	5	2	0	3	2	0	0	38	7
Falkirk	Total		69	14	3	0	4	2	1	1	77	17
Sheffield United	2011–12	League One	26	2	3	1	1	0	5 (Note: Two appearances in the Football League Trophy and three in the League One play-offs)	0	35	3
Sheffield United	2012–13	League One	36	3	4	0	1	0	3 (Note: Two appearances in the Football League Trophy and one in the League One play-offs)	0	44	3
Sheffield United	2013–14	League One	32	5	8	2	1	0	1 (Note: Appearances in the Football League Trophy)	0	42	7
Sheffield United	2014–15	League One	32	1	5	2	5	0	3 (Note: One appearance in the Football League Trophy and two in the League One play-offs)	0	45	3
Sheffield United	2015–16	League One	27	2	1	0	0	0	1	1	29	3
Sheffield United	Total		153	13	21	5	8	0	13	1	195	19
Oldham Athletic	2016–17	League One	37	1	1	1	1	1	5 (Note: Appearances in the EFL Trophy)	0	44	3
Oldham Athletic	2017–18	League One	7	0	1	0	0	0	2	0	10	0
Oldham Athletic	Total		44	1	2	1	1	1	7	0	54	3
St Mirren	2017–18	Scottish Championship	13	1	1	0	—		—		14	1
St Mirren	2018–19	Scottish Premiership	26	1	2	0	4	0	1 (Note: One appearance in the Scottish Premiership play-offs)	0	33	1
St Mirren	2019–20	Scottish Premiership	22	0	1	0	4	0	0	0	27	0
St Mirren	2020–21	Scottish Premiership	14	0	1	0	1	0	0	0	16	0
St Mirren	2021–22	Scottish Premiership	23	0	2	0	1	0	0	0	26	0
St Mirren	2022–23	Scottish Premiership	20	0	2	0	2	0	0	0	24	0
St Mirren	2023–24	Scottish Premiership	6	0	0	0	0	0	0	0	6	0
St Mirren	Total		124	2	9	0	12	0	1	0	146	2
Career total			415	30	35	6	25	3	24	2	499	41

== Honours ==
Liverpool

- FA Youth Cup: 2005–06, 2006–07

St Mirren

- Scottish Championship: 2017–18

Personal

- SPL Young Player of the Month: March 2010
