= Ryan Strain =

Australian footballer

Personal information
- Date of birth: 2 April 1997 (age 29)
- Place of birth: Coventry, England
- Height: 1.81 m (5 ft 11 in)
- Position: Right back

Team information
- Current team: Falkirk
- Number: 22

Youth career
- 2013–2014: Aston Villa

Senior career*
Years	Team	Apps	(Gls)
2015	Modbury Jets	6	(1)
2016–2017	Adelaide United NPL	31	(7)
2017–2021	Adelaide United	82	(0)
2021–2022	Maccabi Haifa	9	(0)
2022–2024	St Mirren	53	(5)
2024–2026	Dundee United	49	(1)
2026–	Falkirk	0	(0)

International career^{‡}
2022–	Australia	4	(0)
- * Club domestic league appearances and goals as of 20 May 2026 ‡ National team caps and goals as of 26 October 2023

Ryan Strain (born 2 April 1997) is an Australian professional soccer player who plays as a right back for Scottish Premiership club Falkirk. Born in England, he plays for the Australia national team.

== Club career ==
=== Adelaide United ===
On 22 September 2017, Strain signed a 1-year scholarship contract with Adelaide United. 3 months later, he signed a two-year contract extension as a senior player, making him the 30th player to progress from the club's youth team to their senior team.

=== Maccabi Haifa ===
In June 2021, Strain joined Israeli club Maccabi Haifa.

=== St Mirren ===
In June 2022, Strain joined Scottish club St Mirren on a two-year deal, following the expiry of his contract at Israeli side Maccabi Haifa. Ryan left St Mirren in June 2024 at the end of his contract, deciding his future lay elsewhere. His grandfather Gerry Baker played for the Paisley club between 1958 and 1960.

== International career ==
=== Youth ===
Strain was called up to an Australian under-20 squad in August 2015.

In November 2020, Strain was called up to the Australian under-23 team for friendlies against A-League sides. He made his debut on 17 November 2020 in a practice match against the new expansion A-League club Macarthur FC.

=== Senior ===
Strain was called up to the Australian senior national team in August 2021, for 2022 World Cup qualifiers against China and Vietnam. Strain did not feature in either game, with media reports suggesting that he had injured his hamstring.

Strain was again called up to the Australian squad in September 2022 for two friendly matches against New Zealand in the lead-up to the 2022 FIFA World Cup. He made his debut for Australia in the second game, a 2–0 win, as a second-half substitute.

After missing out on selection in Australia's squad for the 2022 FIFA World Cup, Strain was next called up for Australia for friendly matches against Ecuador in March 2023, following the withdrawal of Aaron Mooy due to injury. He made his second appearance for Australia as a substitute in a loss to Argentina on 15 June 2023. Strain made his first international start in a 1–0 loss to England at Wembley Stadium on 13 October 2023.

== Personal life ==
Strain is the son of English athlete Lorraine Baker and the grandson of American-born footballer Gerry Baker, who also played for St Mirren. He is also younger brother of Aston Villa F.C. trainee Tom Strain, who plays for Salisbury United FC.

== Career statistics ==
=== Club ===
As of match played 2 March 2025

Appearances and goals by club, season and competition
Club	Season	League			National cup (Note: Includes Australia Cup, Israel State Cup, Scottish Cup)		League cup (Note: Includes Scottish League Cup, Toto Cup)		Other		Total	
Club	Season	Division	Apps	Goals	Apps	Goals	Apps	Goals	Apps	Goals	Apps	Goals
Modbury Jets	2015	NPL SA	6	1	—		—		—		6	1
Adelaide United Youth	2016	NPL SA	9	0	—		—		—		9	0
Adelaide United Youth	2017	NPL SA	22	7	—		—		—		22	7
Adelaide United Youth	Total		31	8	0	0	—		0	0	31	8
Adelaide United	2017–18	A-League	16	0	0	0	—		—		16	0
Adelaide United	2018–19	A-League	22	0	4	0	—		—		26	0
Adelaide United	2019–20	A-League	22	0	5	0	—		—		27	0
Adelaide United	2020–21	A-League	21	0	0	0	—		—		21	0
Adelaide United	Total		81	0	9	0	—		0	0	90	0
Maccabi Haifa	2021–22	Liga Ha'Al	9	0	1	0	1	0	4 (Note: Appearance(s) in UEFA Europa Conference League)	0	15	0
St. Mirren	2022–23	Scottish Premiership	36	4	2	0	3	0	—		41	4
St. Mirren	2023–24	Scottish Premiership	17	1	0	0	6	0	—		23	1
St. Mirren	Total		53	5	2	0	9	0	0	0	64	5
Dundee United	2024–25	Scottish Premiership	20	0	1	0	2	0	—		23	0
Career total			194	13	13	0	14	0	4	0	223	21

== Honours ==
Adelaide United

- FFA Cup: 2018, 2019

Maccabi Haifa

- Toto Cup: 2021–22
- Israel Super Cup: 2021

Individual

- Scottish Premiership Player of the Month: August 2023
