= Richard Taylor (footballer, born 2000) =

English footballer (born 2000)

Personal information
- Full name: Richard Akinfolarin Taylor
- Date of birth: 2 October 2000 (age 26)
- Place of birth: Hackney, England
- Height: 6 ft 2 in (1.89 m)
- Position: Left-back

Team information
- Current team: Bromley (on loan from Bolton Wanderers)
- Number: 3

Youth career
- 2017–2018: Burnley

Senior career*
Years	Team	Apps	(Gls)
2018–2019	Burnley	0	(0)
2018	→ Colne (loan)		
2019–2021	Southend United	14	(0)
2021	→ Barnet (loan)	6	(0)
2021	Dulwich Hamlet	0	(0)
2021–2022	Dagenham & Redbridge	0	(0)
2022	Waterford	29	(1)
2023–2025	St Mirren	71	(2)
2025–	Bolton Wanderers	7	(0)
2026–	→ Bromley (loan)	4	(0)
- * Club domestic league appearances and goals as of 13:20, 28 October 2026 (UTC)

Richard Akinfolarin Taylor (born 2 October 2000) is an English professional footballer who plays as a left-back for EFL League One club Bromley, on loan from EFL Championship club Bolton Wanderers.

== Career ==
Taylor began his career at Burnley. In October 2018, Taylor joined Colne on loan, joining fellow Burnley scholars Michael Fowler, Will Harris and Ethan Kershaw also on loan at the club. In May 2019, Taylor signed for EFL League One club Southend United, after impressing for the club on trial. On 13 November 2019, Taylor made his debut for the club in a 3–1 EFL Trophy win against AFC Wimbledon. On 26 February 2021, Taylor joined National League side Barnet on loan for a month. He was released by Southend in the summer of 2021 following their relegation from the English Football League to the National League. Having dropped out of the professional game, Taylor played for well-known YouTube Sunday League side, SE Dons, in one of their XI matches for charity. He then appeared in a league match vs Kenningwell, in which he impressed, and had many admirers. He had a short spell at National League South side Dulwich Hamlet before he signed for National League side Dagenham & Redbridge on a free transfer after training with the club for a number of weeks. On 29 January 2022, Taylor joined League of Ireland First Division side Waterford on a free transfer.

After a successful season with Waterford, Taylor signed a short-term deal with Scottish Premiership side St Mirren on 1 January 2023, keeping him there until the end of the season.

In May 2023, Taylor extended his contract with Saints until the summer of 2025.

On 13 June 2025, it was announced that Taylor had signed for EFL League One side Bolton Wanderers on a three-year contract. He made his debut in the 1-1 draw against Lincoln City on 23 August, coming on as an 88th minute substitute for Max Conway, and scored his first goal for the club in their FA Cup first round defeat of Huddersfield Town on 1 November. On 25 July 2026, Taylor joined League One side Bromley on a season long loan.

== Personal life ==
Born in Hackney, Taylor is of Nigerian descent.

== Career statistics ==
As of match played 20 October 2026

Appearances and goals by club, season and competition
Club	Season	League			National cup (Note: Includes FA Cup, Scottish Cup)		League cup (Note: Includes Scottish League Cup, EFL Cup)		Other		Total	
Club	Season	Division	Apps	Goals	Apps	Goals	Apps	Goals	Apps	Goals	Apps	Goals
Southend United	2019–20	League One	2	0	0	0	0	0	1 (Note: Appearance(s) in the EFL Trophy)	0	3	0
Southend United	2020–21	League Two	12	0	0	0	1	0	3	0	16	0
Southend United	Total		14	0	0	0	1	0	4	0	19	0
Barnet (loan)	2020–21	National League	4	0	—		—		—		4	0
Dulwich Hamlet	2020–21	National League South	0	0	—		—		—		0	0
Dagenham & Redbridge	2020–21	National League	0	0	—		—		0	0	0	0
Waterford	2022	LOI First Division	29	1	3	0	—		3 (Note: One appearance in the Munster Senior Cup & two appearances in the 2022 League of Ireland promotion/relegation playoffs)	0	35	1
St Mirren	2022–23	Scottish Premiership	11	0	1	0	—		—		12	0
St Mirren	2023–24	Scottish Premiership	26	0	0	0	4	0	—		30	0
St Mirren	2024–25	Scottish Premiership	34	2	2	0	1	0	4 (Note: Appearance(s) in UEFA Conference League)	0	41	2
St Mirren	Total		71	2	3	0	5	0	4	0	83	2
Bolton Wanderers	2025–26	League One	7	0	2	1	0	0	5	0	14	1
Bolton Wanderers	2026–27	League One	0	0	0	0	0	0	—		0	0
Bolton Wanderers	Total		7	0	2	1	0	0	5	0	14	1
Bromley (loan)	2026–27	League One	4	0	0	0	1	0	—		5	0
Career total			129	3	8	1	7	0	16	0	160	4
