= Caolan Boyd-Munce =

Northern Irish footballer (born 2000)

Caolán Boyd-Munce
- Boyd-Munce in 2026

Personal information
- Full name: Caolán Stephen Boyd-Munce
- Date of birth: 26 January 2000 (age 26)
- Place of birth: Belfast, Northern Ireland
- Height: 1.83 m (6 ft 0 in)
- Position: Midfielder

Team information
- Current team: Wycombe Wanderers
- Number: 8

Youth career
- 200?–2016: Glentoran

Senior career*
Years	Team	Apps	(Gls)
2016	Glentoran	1	(0)
2016–2022	Birmingham City	7	(0)
2018	→ Redditch United (loan)	4	(0)
2022–2023	Middlesbrough	2	(0)
2023–2025	St Mirren	68	(5)
2025–	Wycombe Wanderers	31	(3)

International career^{‡}
- Northern Ireland U15
- Northern Ireland U16
2016	Northern Ireland U17	3	(0)
2017	Northern Ireland U19	3	(0)
2019–2022	Northern Ireland U21	21	(0)
2024–	Northern Ireland	2	(0)
- * Club domestic league appearances and goals as of 16 March 2026 (UTC) ‡ National team caps and goals as of 15:30, 29 September 2024 (UTC)

Caolán Stephen Boyd-Munce (born 26 January 2000) is a Northern Irish professional footballer who plays as a midfielder for EFL League One club Wycombe Wanderers and the Northern Ireland national team.

Boyd-Munce made one senior appearance for Glentoran in the NIFL Premiership before moving to England in 2016 to join EFL Championship club Birmingham City. He made nine appearances for Birmingham, all but one during the 2019–20 season, before signing for divisional rivals Middlesbrough in January 2022. Boyd-Munce was released by Middlesbrough in January 2023, and then signed for St Mirren two months later.

In international football, Boyd-Munce has represented Northern Ireland from under-15 up to senior level.

== Early life and career ==
Boyd-Munce was born in Belfast where he attended De La Salle College. He was on the books of Glentoran as a youngster, and made a brief first-team appearance on 30 April 2016 as a 78th-minute substitute in an NIFL Premiership match against Crusaders.

== Club career ==
=== Birmingham City ===
After leaving school Boyd-Munce came to England where he took up a two-year scholarship with Birmingham City F.C.'s Academy in July 2016. Academy coach Steve Spooner described him as a "good technician [who] has a very good engine and displays the capabilities of a real box to box midfield player." He established himself in Birmingham's under-18 team, played for the under-23s, and was a member of the youth team that reached the semifinal of the 2017–18 FA Youth Cup, in which Chelsea beat Birmingham 7–0 on aggregate. He was not offered professional terms after his two years, instead accepting a third scholarship year.

In August 2018, Boyd-Munce spent a month on loan to Redditch United. He played four matches in the Southern League Premier Division South and, according to senior development coach Richard Beale, found it an eye-opening experience. Boyd-Munce went on to become a regular for Birmingham's development squad team the 2018–19 season, making 21 appearances as they finished as runners-up in the Professional Development League northern section and lost out to Leeds United on penalties for the overall title. He was offered a two-year deal in March 2019, and signed it in June.

Boyd-Munce made his competitive debut for Birmingham on 6 August 2019 in the EFL Cup first round. Manager Pep Clotet fielded an inexperienced team for the visit to Portsmouth, and Boyd-Munce came into the 3–0 defeat as a second-half substitute, replacing Jude Bellingham after 81 minutes. He made his first appearance in the Championship on 7 February 2020, as a very late substitute in a 3–1 win away to Bristol City, and made a further five, all from the bench, in the last few matches of the 2019–20 season. In November 2020, new head coach Aitor Karanka gave Boyd-Munce a difficult first league start, playing out of position at left wing-back directly marking AFC Bournemouth's in-form winger David Brooks. Later that month, he injured an ankle and did not return to first-team training until the end of the following March. Although he regained sufficient fitness to help Birmingham's U23 team beat Sheffield United U23 in the national final of the 2020–21 Professional Development League, he had no matchday involvement with the first team in what remained of the season.

In June 2021, reassured as to his future by manager Lee Bowyer and director of football Craig Gardner, Boyd-Munce signed a two-year contract to remain with Birmingham City. However, he had no further involvement with the first-team matchday squad, and Bowyer suggested he was likely to be leaving.

=== Middlesbrough ===
On 7 January 2022, Boyd-Munce signed a two-and-a-half-year contract with another Championship club, Middlesbrough, for an undisclosed fee. He started the next day's FA Cup third-round tie away to League Two club Mansfield Town, scored his side's second goal after 14 minutes of a 3–2 victory and, according to the TeessideLive reporter, made a positive contribution both in and out of possession in the hour he spent on the pitch. He made only two Championship appearances over the next 12 months, both as a substitute, and his contract was terminated by mutual consent at the end of the January 2023 transfer window.

=== St Mirren ===
Boyd-Munce signed a short-term contract with Scottish Premiership club St Mirren in March 2023. On 31 May 2023, Boyd-Munce signed a one-year contract extension with St Mirren and on 5 April 2024 the contract was extended until the summer of 2025 after he met the terms of an appearance-based clause.

He departed the club at the end of the 2024–25 season.

=== Wycombe Wanderers ===
On 16 June 2025, Boyd-Munce agreed to join League One club Wycombe Wanderers upon the expiration of his St Mirren contract.

== International career ==
Boyd-Munce has represented Northern Ireland at under-15, under-16, in the squad for the 2014–15 Victory Shield, under-17, playing in qualifiers for the 2017 European U17 Championships, under-19, playing in qualifiers for the following year's European U19 Championships, and most recently at under-21 level.

Boyd-Munce was called up to the senior Northern Ireland squad in March 2022.

Boyd-Munce made his debut for the senior squad on 8 June 2024 in a friendly against Spain at Estadi Mallorca Son Moix. He started the game and was substituted at half-time as Spain won 5–1.

== Career statistics ==
As of match played 23 September 2025

Appearances and goals by club, season and competition
Club	Season	League			National cup (Note: Includes Irish Cup, FA Cup, Scottish Cup)		League cup (Note: Includes Northern Ireland Football League Cup, EFL Cup, Scottish League Cup)		Other		Total	
Club	Season	Division	Apps	Goals	Apps	Goals	Apps	Goals	Apps	Goals	Apps	Goals
Glentoran	2018–19	NIFL Premiership	1	0	0	0	0	0	—		1	0
Birmingham City	2018–19	Championship	0	0	0	0	0	0	—		0	0
Birmingham City	2019–20	Championship	6	0	1	0	1	0	—		8	0
Birmingham City	2020–21	Championship	1	0	0	0	0	0	—		1	0
Birmingham City	2021–22	Championship	0	0	—		0	0	—		0	0
Birmingham City	Total		7	0	1	0	1	0	—		9	0
Redditch United (loan)	2018–19	Southern League; Premier Division Central	4	0	0	0	—				4	0
Middlesbrough	2021–22	Championship	1	0	1	1	—		—		0	1
Middlesbrough	2022–23	Championship	1	0	0	0	1	0	—		2	0
Middlesbrough	Total		2	0	1	1	1	0	—		4	1
St Mirren	2022–23	Scottish Premiership	3	0	—		—		—		3	0
St Mirren	2023–24	Scottish Premiership	35	0	2	0	6	1	—		43	1
St Mirren	2024–25	Scottish Premiership	30	5	2	1	0	0	3 (Note: Appearances in UEFA Conference League)	0	35	6
St Mirren	Total		68	5	4	1	6	1	3	0	81	7
Wycombe Wanderers	2025–26	EFL League One	35	2	2	0	4	1	3	1	44	4
Wycombe Wanderers	2027-27	EFL League One										
Career total			89	5	6	2	11	2	6	1	109	9
