= Richard Tait (footballer) =

Scottish footballer (born 1989)

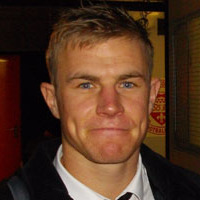
- Tait in 2010

Personal information
- Full name: Richard Neil Peter Tait
- Date of birth: 2 December 1989 (age 36)
- Place of birth: Galashiels, Scotland
- Positions: Centre-back; full-back

Youth career
- Curzon Ashton

Senior career*
Years	Team	Apps	(Gls)
2007–2008	Curzon Ashton		
2008–2009	Nottingham Forest	0	(0)
2009	→ Tamworth (loan)	4	(1)
2009–2013	Tamworth	157	(6)
2013–2015	Cambridge United	72	(0)
2015–2016	Grimsby Town	37	(0)
2016–2020	Motherwell	103	(3)
2020–2023	St. Mirren	72	(2)
Total		445+	(12+)
- * Club domestic league appearances and goals

Richard Neil Peter Tait (born 2 December 1989) is a Scottish former professional footballer who played as a full-back.

He played professionally for Nottingham Forest, Cambridge United, Grimsby Town, Motherwell and St. Mirren. He has also played non-league football for Curzon Ashton and Tamworth.

== Playing career ==
=== Early years ===
Born in Galashiels, Tait began his career with Ashton-under-Lyne side Curzon Ashton. In January 2008, Tait was signed on a youth contract by Nottingham Forest. On 28 March 2009, Tait joined Conference North side Tamworth on loan. At the end of the 2008–09 Tait was released by Forest.

=== Tamworth ===
Tait was snapped up by Conference North side Tamworth following the successful loan. He appeared regularly for the side, and helped Tamworth gain promotion from the Conference North as champions in the 2008–09 season.

He signed a new deal in February 2012.

=== Cambridge United ===
On 8 May 2013 Tait joined Cambridge United. He appeared in 35 league matches during the season, helping the club return to League Two, being a part of the team that won promotion by winning the 2014 Conference Premier play-off final. On 8 August 2014 Tait played in Cambridge's first match back in League Two, starting in a 1–0 home win against Plymouth Argyle. At the end of the 2014–15 season the club did not offer him a new deal when his contract expired.

=== Grimsby Town ===
On 30 June 2015, Tait signed for Conference National side Grimsby Town.

Tait played in Grimsby's 3–1 victory over Forest Green Rovers in the 2016 National League play-off final at Wembley, seeing Grimsby promoted to League Two after a six-year absence from the Football League.

=== Motherwell ===
On 23 June 2016, Tait signed for Scottish Premiership club Motherwell, agreeing a three-year contract. He scored his first goal for Motherwell on 29 October 2016, in a 4–1 win over Ross County. In his last season at Motherwell he helped the Steelmen finish third in the Scottish Premiership which got them into the Europa League qualifiers.

=== St. Mirren ===
On 18 June 2020, Tait signed for Scottish Premiership club St. Mirren, on a two-year deal.

Tait announced his retirement from professional football following the conclusion of the 2022–23 season.

== Career statistics ==
As of 27 May 2023

Appearances and goals by club, season and competition
Club	Season	League			FA Cup		League Cup		Other		Total	
Club	Season	Division	Apps	Goals	Apps	Goals	Apps	Goals	Apps	Goals	Apps	Goals
Curzon Ashton	2007–08	NPL Division One North	0	0	0	0	–		0	0	0	0
Nottingham Forest	2007–08	League One	0	0	0	0	0	0	0	0	0	0
Nottingham Forest	2008–09	Championship	0	0	0	0	0	0	0	0	0	0
Nottingham Forest	Total		0	0	0	0	0	0	0	0	0	0
Tamworth (loan)	2008–09	Conference North	4	1	0	0	–		0	0	4	1
Tamworth	2009–10	Conference Premier	41	3	0	0	–		0	0	41	3
Tamworth	2010–11	Conference Premier	41	1	4	0	–		1 (Note: Appearance(s) in FA Trophy)	0	46	1
Tamworth	2011–12	Conference Premier	41	1	4	0	–		1	0	46	1
Tamworth	2012–13	Conference Premier	34	1	1	0	–		3	0	38	1
Tamworth	Total		157	7	9	0	0	0	5	0	171	7
Cambridge United	2013–14	Conference Premier	35	0	3	0	–		5	0	43	0
Cambridge United	2014–15	League Two	37	0	6	0	1	0	1 (Note: Appearance(s) in Football League Trophy)	0	45	0
Cambridge United	Total		72	0	9	0	1	0	6	0	88	0
Grimsby Town	2015–16	National League	37	0	4	0	–		10 (Note: Seven appearances in FA Trophy, three in National League play-offs)	0	51	0
Motherwell	2016–17	Scottish Premiership	25	1	1	0	5	0	–		31	1
Motherwell	2017–18	Scottish Premiership	34	1	5	0	7	1	–		46	2
Motherwell	2018–19	Scottish Premiership	38	1	1	0	6	1	–		45	2
Motherwell	2019–20	Scottish Premiership	14	0	2	0	4	0	–		20	0
Motherwell	Total		111	3	9	0	22	2	0	0	142	5
St Mirren	2020–21	Scottish Premiership	33	1	3	0	7	1	–		43	2
St Mirren	2021–22	Scottish Premiership	27	0	2	0	1	0	–		30	0
St Mirren	2022–23	Scottish Premiership	12	1	0	0	2	0	–		14	1
St Mirren	Total		72	2	5	0	10	1	0	0	87	3
Career total			453	12	36	0	33	3	21	0	543	15

== Honours ==
=== Club ===
Tamworth

- Conference North: 2008–09

Cambridge United

- Conference Premier play-offs: 2014
- FA Trophy: 2013–14

Grimsby Town

- National League play-offs: 2016
- FA Trophy runner-up: 2015–16
