= Pedro Moutinho =

Portuguese footballer

Personal information
- Full name: Pedro da Silva Moutinho
- Date of birth: 9 September 1979 (age 47)
- Place of birth: Santo Tirso, Portugal
- Height: 1.86 m (6 ft 1 in)
- Position: Centre-forward

Youth career
- 1991–1996: Tirsense
- 1996–1998: Vitória Guimarães

Senior career*
Years	Team	Apps	(Gls)
1998–1999	Rio Maior		
1999–2002	Marítimo B	58	(11)
2000–2004	Marítimo	2	(0)
2002	→ Famalicão (loan)	21	(6)
2002–2004	→ Penafiel (loan)	31	(5)
2004–2008	Falkirk	105	(16)
2008–2009	Marítimo	3	(0)
2008–2009	Marítimo B	6	(3)
2009	→ Rio Ave (loan)	11	(0)
2009–2010	Falkirk	25	(5)
2010	AEP	3	(1)
2011	Falkirk	10	(0)
2011–2012	Brașov	30	(7)
2012–2013	Atlético Baleares	6	(0)
2015	Stenhousemuir	2	(0)
2016–2017	Caniçal	30	(4)
Total		343	(58)

International career
2000	Portugal U20	3	(1)
2000	Portugal U21	1	(0)
- * Club domestic league appearances and goals

Pedro da Silva Moutinho (born 9 September 1979) is a Portuguese retired footballer who played as a centre-forward.

He spent most of his professional career in Scotland with Falkirk (three spells, 161 overall appearances and 23 goals). Other than in his own country, he also competed in Cyprus and Romania.

== Club career ==
Born in Santo Tirso, Porto District, Moutinho moved to C.S. Marítimo from amateurs U.D. Rio Maior, but spent the better part of his early years with the former's reserves. He also served two loans whilst under contract, including a two-year spell at F.C. Penafiel of the Segunda Liga.

In summer 2004, Moutinho signed a one-year contract with Falkirk in Scotland. He scored 19 competitive goals in his first four seasons at the club, including a memorable one against Rangers for the equaliser in a 2–2 draw in 2005, but a knee injury kept him out of the second half of his team's Scottish First Division championship-winning side in 2004–05.

Moutinho was close to sealing a transfer to Kayserispor, but the deal was not concluded before the closure of the Turkish January transfer window. On 21 May 2008, he left Falkirk and returned to his country by rejoining Marítimo; he remarked "I am going to keep the house I have in Falkirk and hopefully I’ll be back. I feel now is the right move for me with a two-year contract but after that I will be a free agent again and who knows".

Rarely used during his second stint in Madeira, Moutinho finished the campaign on loan to Rio Ave F.C. also of the Primeira Liga. He also did not manage to find the net here.

In October 2009, Moutinho was released by Marítimo and returned to Falkirk. On 8 November, he started and scored during their 3–3 home draw with Celtic and, in January of the following year, his contract was extended until the end of 2009–10.

Moutinho left the Falkirk Stadium on 13 May 2010, signing with AEP Paphos FC from Cyprus. In late January 2011, however, following a trial at fellow Scottish Premier League side Motherwell, he re-signed with Falkirk for a third time, being released at the end of the season.

In early August 2011, the 32-year-old Moutinho changed teams and countries again, joining FC Brașov in Romania. Subsequently, he agreed to a one-year deal at CD Atlético Baleares of the Spanish Segunda División B.

On 31 March 2015, after nearly two years out of football, Moutinho moved to Scottish League One club Stenhousemuir until June. At the end of the campaign, he was released.

After one season in the Portuguese lower leagues, being relegated with C.F. Caniçal, Moutinho retired at 37 and became a football consultant in Madeira.
