= Stav Nahmani =

Israeli footballer

Personal information
- Full name: Stav Nahmani
- Date of birth: October 6, 2002 (age 24)
- Place of birth: Gimzo, Israel
- Position: Forward

Team information
- Current team: Bnei Yehuda
- Number: 9

Youth career
- 2009–2010: Maccabi Modi'in
- 2010–2017: Maccabi Tel Aviv
- 2017–2021: Maccabi Haifa

Senior career*
Years	Team	Apps	(Gls)
2020–2024	Maccabi Haifa	12	(0)
2021–2022	→ Hapoel Nof HaGalil (loan)	32	(4)
2022–2023	→ Beitar Jerusalem (loan)	11	(0)
2023	→ Hapoel Hadera (loan)	13	(2)
2023–2024	→ St Mirren (loan)	9	(1)
2024	→ F.C. Ashdod (loan)	9	(3)
2024–2026	F.C. Ashdod	29	(5)
2026	Bnei Sakhnin	6	(0)
2026–	Bnei Yehuda	0	(0)

International career
2017–2018	Israel U16	5	(3)
2018–2019	Israel U17	10	(1)
2019	Israel U18	3	(0)
2019	Israel U19	2	(0)
2021–2024	Israel U21	8	(2)
- * Club domestic league appearances and goals as of 24 June 2026

Stav Nahmani (Hebrew: סתיו נחמני; born 6 October 2002) is an Israeli professional footballer who plays as a forward for Bnei Yehuda.

== Career ==
Nahmani started his career in Maccabi Tel Aviv academy and signed for Maccabi Haifa when he was 15.

On 30 May 2020 he made his senior debut in the 1–2 loss to Hapoel Tel Aviv.

In summer 2021, he was loaned to Hapoel Nof HaGalil. On 11 September, he scored his first goal in the 3–1 win against Maccabi Netanya

In June 2023, Nahmani joined Scottish Premiership side St Mirren on loan until the end of the season, with an option to make the deal permanent.

Nahmani scored twice in his debut for St. Mirren, coming off the bench against Arbroath in the group stages of the Scottish League Cup.

== See also ==
- List of Jewish footballers
- List of Jews in sports
- List of Israelis
- List of Israel international footballers
