= Lewis Jamieson =

Scottish footballer

Personal information
- Date of birth: 17 April 2002 (age 24)
- Place of birth: Port Glasgow, Scotland
- Height: 5 ft 9 in (1.75 m)
- Position: Forward

Team information
- Current team: Ross County

Youth career
- 2019: St Mirren

Senior career*
Years	Team	Apps	(Gls)
2019–2025	St Mirren	17	(1)
2021	→ Clyde (loan)	12	(4)
2021–2022	→ Inverness Caledonian Thistle (loan)	7	(1)
2022	→ Clyde (loan)	13	(5)
2022–2023	→ Airdrieonians (loan)	18	(8)
2024–2025	→ Raith Rovers (loan)	17	(3)
2025–2026	Sacramento Republic	19	(3)
2026	Newport County	3	(0)
2026–	Ross County	0	(0)
- * Club domestic league appearances and goals as of 12:45, 23 July 2026 (UTC)

Lewis Jamieson (born 17 April 2002) is a Scottish professional footballer who plays as a forward for Scottish League One club Ross County. He has previously played for St Mirren, Clyde (twice), Inverness Caledonian Thistle, Airdrieonians and Newport County.

== Youth career ==
Born in Scotland, Jamieson spent his youth career with St Mirren Under-20s from the age of 17.

== Career ==
=== St Mirren: 2019-2025 ===
Jamieson signed his first senior contract with St Mirren F.C. in 2019. He was included in squad of St Mirren to take part in the 2019-20 Scottish Premiership season. Despite making it to the squad, Jamieson missed out to make any league appearance of the club in the season. Jamieson made four appearances for the club in the Scottish League Challenge Cup that season. Jamieson stayed at St Mirren for the 2020-21 Scottish Premiership season.

Jamieson made his league debut against Rangers FC on 9 August 2020 as a substitute for Cameron MacPherson in the 85th minute of the match. The match ended 3–0 to Rangers. Jamieson made his Scottish League Cup debut against Partick Thistle F.C. on 7 October 2020 as a substitute for Jonathan Obika in the 84th minute of the game. The match ended 4–1 to St Mirren.

==== Clyde (loan) ====
Jamieson was loaned to Scottish third tier club Clyde FC in March 2021. He played his debut match for the club on 20 March against East Fife, which they lost 1–3.

==== Inverness Caledonian Thistle (loan) ====
In July 2021 Jamieson was loaned for the 2021–22 season to Scottish Championship (second tier) club Inverness Caledonian Thistle. He made twelve appearances and scored three goals in all competitions for the club before being recalled by St Mirren on 25 January 2022.

==== Clyde (2nd loan) ====
On 25 January 2022, Jamieson returned to Clyde on loan until the end of the season, and would make his 2nd debut on the same day.

=== Airdrieonians (loan) ===
On 27 July 2022, Jamieson joined Airdrieonians on loan.

After a successful loan stint in which he scored 8 goals in 20 appearances, Jamieson was recalled on 25 January 2023 by St Mirren.

=== Raith Rovers (loan) ===
On 22 August 2024, Jamieson joined Raith Rovers on loan until the end of the season.

=== Sacramento Republic ===
On 23 January 2025, Jamieson signed with second-tier US side Sacramento Republic ahead of their 2025 season in the USL Championship.

=== Newport County ===
On 16 January 2026 Jamieson joined EFL League Two club Newport County on a contract until the end of the 2026-27 season. He made his Newport debut on 31 January 2026 in the EFL League Two 3-0 defeat to Bristol Rovers.

=== Ross County ===
On 23 July 2026 Ross County announced Jamieson had signed for an undisclosed fee.

== Career statistics ==
As of match played 1 November 2024

Appearances and goals by club, season and competition
Club	Season	League			Scottish Cup		Scottish League Cup		Continental		Other		Total	
Club	Season	Division	Apps	Goals	Apps	Goals	Apps	Goals	Apps	Goals	Apps	Goals	Apps	Goals
St Mirren B	2019-20	—			—		—		—		4 (Note: Appearance(s) in Scottish Challenge Cup)	0	4	0
St Mirren	2019-20	Scottish Premiership	0	0	0	0	0	0	—		—		0	0
St Mirren	2020-21	Scottish Premiership	2	0	0	0	1	0	—		—		3	0
St Mirren	2021-22	Scottish Premiership	0	0	0	0	0	0	—		—		0	0
St Mirren	2022-23	Scottish Premiership	7	0	0	0	1	0	—		—		8	0
St Mirren	2023-24	Scottish Premiership	19	1	2	0	4	0	—		—		25	1
St Mirren	2024-25	Scottish Premiership	0	0	0	0	0	0	0	0	—		0	0
St Mirren	Total		28	1	2	0	6	0	0	0	—		36	1
Clyde (loan)	2020-21	Scottish League One	12	4	3	0	0	0	—		0	0	15	4
Inverness Caledonian Thistle (loan)	2021-22	Scottish Championship	8	1	1	0	1	0	—		3	2	13	3
Clyde (loan)	2021-22	Scottish League One	13	5	0	0	0	0	—		0	0	13	5
Airdrieonians (loan)	2022-23	Scottish League One	18	8	0	0	0	0	—		1	0	19	8
Raith Rovers (loan)	2024-25	Scottish Championship	10	2	0	0	0	0	—		1	0	11	2
Career total			89	21	6	0	7	0	0	0	9	2	111	23
