= Kieran Offord =

Scottish footballer

Personal information
- Full name: Kieran Offord
- Date of birth: 28 March 2004 (age 22)
- Place of birth: Airdrie, Scotland
- Height: 6 ft 3 in (1.90 m)
- Position: Striker

Team information
- Current team: Linfield
- Number: 9

Youth career
- St Mirren

Senior career*
Years	Team	Apps	(Gls)
2021–2025	St Mirren	11	(0)
2021	→ East Stirlingshire (loan)	2	(1)
2021–2022	→ East Stirlingshire (loan)	16	(11)
2022–2023	→ Alloa Athletic (loan)	13	(3)
2023	→ Edinburgh City (loan)	18	(2)
2024	→ Stirling Albion (loan)	18	(3)
2024–2025	→ Crusaders (loan)	21	(10)
2025–	Linfield	25	(6)

International career^{‡}
2019	Scotland U16	3	(2)
2021–2022	Scotland U19	6	(2)
- * Club domestic league appearances and goals as of 29 April 2026 ‡ National team caps and goals as of 09:14, 27 March 2024 (UTC)

Kieran Offord (born 28 March 2004) is a Scottish professional footballer who plays as a striker for NIFL Premiership club Linfield.

== Club career ==
After coming through the youth ranks at St Mirren, Offord joined Lowland League side East Stirlingshire on loan in December 2021. He scored on his debut against Dalbeattie Star. He also featured against Celtic B.

On 22 December 2021, Offord was recalled and made his St Mirren debut in a 0–0 draw with Celtic in the Scottish Premiership. He was brought into the squad due to a COVID-19 outbreak in the squad and played on the right wing. He made a second appearance days later on 26 December, coming on as a late substitute against Rangers. On 28 December 2021, Offord was back in the East Stirlingshire side.

In the summer of 2022, Offord returned to the St Mirren first team. He scored in a friendly against Crusaders and started in a 2-0 League Cup win over Cowdenbeath. In September 2022, Offord joined Alloa Athletic on a season-long loan. He scored on his debut against Clyde. On 20 January 2023, Offord was recalled by St Mirren.

Offord signed a new contract with St Mirren in August 2023, while he was also loaned to Edinburgh City. In January 2024, Offord joined Stirling Albion on loan.

In June 2024 Offord signed on a season-long loan for NIFL Premiership side Crusaders. After a successful loan spell including his first career hat-trick, St Mirren recalled Offord on 20 January 2025. Later that month, he returned to Northern Ireland to join Linfield for an undisclosed fee.

== International career ==
In October 2019, Offord was called up to the Scotland national under-16 football team. He scored twice on his debut against the Republic of Ireland.

In November 2021, Offord was called up to the Scotland national under-19 squad to play in Croatia.
