= 2025–26 St Johnstone F.C. season =

St Johnstone
2025–26 season
- Chief executive: Francis Smith
- Manager: Simo Valakari
- Stadium: McDiarmid Park
- Scottish Championship: Winners
- Scottish Cup: Third round
- League Cup: Second round
- Challenge Cup: Quarter-finals
- Top goalscorer: League: Josh McPake (16); All: Josh McPake (19)
- Highest home attendance: 8,347 vs. Dunfermline Athletic, Championship, 24 January 2026
- Lowest home attendance: 999 vs. Ayr United, Challenge Cup, 17 February 2026
- Average home league attendance: 4,658

The 2025–26 season is St Johnstone's first season in the Scottish Championship and their first season back in the second tier of Scottish football following their relegation from the Scottish Premiership at the end of the 2024–25 season. Saints will also compete in the League Cup, Scottish Cup, and for the first time in 16 years, the Challenge Cup.

== Competitions ==
Win Draw Loss Postponed

=== Pre-season and friendlies ===
5 July 2025	Forfar Athletic	1–1	St Johnstone	Forfar
14:00 BST	Morrison 33'	Report	Gullan 9' (pen.)	Stadium: Station Park; Attendance: 992; Referee: Duncan Nicolson

8 July 2025	St Johnstone	0–1	Falkirk	Perth
19:30 BST		Report	Arfield 9'	Stadium: McDiarmid Park; Attendance: 2,004; Referee: Greg Soutar

15 July 2025	St Johnstone	1–1	Dundee United	Perth
19:45 BST	Kirk 86'	Report	Esselink 18'	Stadium: McDiarmid Park; Referee: Nick Walsh

=== Scottish Championship ===
2 August 2025 1	St Johnstone	5–1	Partick Thistle	Perth
15:00	Gullan 17'; McPake 28', 37', 48'; Mallan 82'	Report	Reading 15'	Stadium: McDiarmid Park; Attendance: 4,991; Referee: Ross Hardie

8 August 2025 2	Ross County	0–1	St Johnstone	Dingwall
19:45		Report	Ikpeazu 82'	Stadium: Victoria Park; Attendance: 3,185; Referee: Dan McFarlane

23 August 2025 3	St Johnstone	3–0	Arbroath	Perth
15:00	Baird 31'; Holt 60'; Mallan 71' (pen.)	Report		Stadium: McDiarmid Park; Attendance: 4,013; Referee: Peter Stuart

30 August 2025 4	St Johnstone	1–1	Greenock Morton	Perth
15:00	McPake 83'	Report	Brophy 22'	Stadium: McDiarmid Park; Attendance: 3,548; Referee: Grant Irvine

13 September 2025 5	Raith Rovers	0–2	St Johnstone	Kirkcaldy
15:00		Report	Sidibeh 29'; McPake 88'	Stadium: Stark's Park; Attendance: 5,163; Referee: Chris Graham

19 September 2025 6	St Johnstone	2–1	Dunfermline Athletic	Perth
19:45	Fotheringham 51'; McPake 83'	Report	MacLeod 83'	Stadium: McDiarmid Park; Attendance: 6,232; Referee: Matthew Macdermid

23 September 2025 7	Airdrieonians	1–2	St Johnstone	Airdrie
19:45	Cooper 74'; Reid (red card) 90+7'	Report	Gullan 9'; Diabate 19' (red card) 90+6'	Stadium: Excelsior Stadium; Attendance: 1,874; Referee: Lloyd Wilson

27 September 2025 8	Queen's Park	1–2	St Johnstone	Glasgow
15:00	Fowler 43'	Report	Fotheringham 37'; McPake 89'	Stadium: Lesser Hampden; Attendance: 893; Referee: Peter Stuart

4 October 2025 9	St Johnstone	0–0	Ayr United	Perth
15:00		Report		Stadium: McDiarmid Park; Attendance: 4,277; Referee: Ryan Lee

11 October 2025 10	St Johnstone	0–0	Ross County	Perth
15:00		Report		Stadium: McDiarmid Park; Attendance: 3,750; Referee: David Dickinson

18 October 2025 11	Arbroath	3–1	St Johnstone	Arbroath
15:00	Marshall 51', 62'; Reilly 57'	Report	McPake 5'	Stadium: Gayfield Park; Attendance: 2,788; Referee: Duncan Nicolson

25 October 2025 12	Greenock Morton	0–4	St Johnstone	Greenock
15:00		Report	Diabate 5'; Gullan 12', 34'; McPake 26'	Stadium: Cappielow; Attendance: 2,068; Referee: Euan Anderson

1 November 2025 13	St Johnstone	3–0	Airdrieonians	Perth
15:00	Sidibeh 25', 53', 73'	Report		Stadium: McDiarmid Park; Attendance: 4,607; Referee: Greg Soutar

8 November 2025 14	Dunfermline Athletic	2–2	St Johnstone	Dunfermline
15:00	Stewart 8'; A.Tod 90+1'	Report	McAlear 30'; Smith 66'	Stadium: East End Park; Attendance: 6,894; Referee: Ross Hardie

15 November 2025 15	St Johnstone	4–3	Queen's Park	Perth
15:00	Gullan 16', 30' (pen.); Stanton 18'; Baird 84'	Report	Drozd 59'; Fowler 62' (pen.); Friel 90+2'	Stadium: McDiarmid Park; Attendance: 4,012; Referee: Alastair Grieve

22 November 2025 16	Partick Thistle	2–1	St Johnstone	Glasgow
15:00	O'Reilly 6'; Watt 45+2'	Report	McPake 71'	Stadium: Firhill Stadium; Attendance: 5,461; Referee: Don Robertson

6 December 2025 17	St Johnstone	0–0	Raith Rovers	Perth
15:00		Report		Stadium: McDiarmid Park; Attendance: 4,113; Referee: Lloyd Wilson

12 December 2025 18	Ayr United	2–4	St Johnstone	Ayr
19:45	McKenzie 8'; Murphy 14'	Report	Foulds 47'; McPake 77', 88'; Fotheringham 90+2'	Stadium: Somerset Park; Attendance: 1,946; Referee: Colin Steven

20 December 2025 19	St Johnstone	5–0	Greenock Morton	Perth
15:00	McPake 12'; Stanton 24'; Gullan 39', 70'; Sidibeh 76'	Report		Stadium: McDiarmid Park; Attendance: 4,363; Referee: Colin Steven

27 December 2025 20	Ross County	0–0	St Johnstone	Dingwall
15:00		Report		Stadium: Victoria Park; Attendance: 3,433; Referee: Sean Murdoch

3 January 2026 21	St Johnstone	1–0	Arbroath	Perth
15:00	Sidibeh 25'	Report		Stadium: McDiarmid Park; Attendance: 4,462; Referee: Iain Snedden

24 January 2026 22	St Johnstone	0–1	Dunfermline Athletic	Perth
15:00		Report	Fraser 50'	Stadium: McDiarmid Park; Attendance: 8,347; Referee: David Dickinson

30 January 2026 23	St Johnstone	2–2	Partick Thistle	Perth
19:45	Agyeman 48'; McPake 66'	Report	Smyth 42', 90+6' (pen.)	Stadium: McDiarmid Park; Attendance: 5,949; Referee: Sean Murdoch

13 February 2026 24	Airdrieonians	0–1	St Johnstone	Airdrie
19:45		Report	Paton 22'	Stadium: Excelsior Stadium; Attendance: 1,641; Referee: Colin Steven

20 February 2026 25	Raith Rovers	0–0	St Johnstone	Kirkcaldy
19:45		Report		Stadium: Stark's Park; Attendance: 4,121; Referee: Ross Hardie

24 February 2026 26	Queen's Park	1–1	St Johnstone	Glasgow
19:45	Murray 90'	Report	Fowler 55'; Boyes (red card) 90+1'	Stadium: Lesser Hampden; Attendance: 805; Referee: Calum Scott

28 February 2026 27	St Johnstone	3–1	Ayr United	Perth
15:00	McAlear 16'; Diabate 42'; Paton 86'	Report	Dick 18'	Stadium: McDiarmid Park; Attendance: 3,961; Referee: Dan McFarlane

7 March 2026 28	Greenock Morton	0–2	St Johnstone	Greenock
15:00		Report	McAlear 79'; Smith 88'	Stadium: Cappielow; Attendance: 1,798; Referee: Duncan Nicolson

14 March 2026 29	St Johnstone	1–0	Ross County	Perth
15:00	McAlear 25'	Report		Stadium: McDiarmid Park; Attendance: 4,223; Referee: Colin Steven

20 March 2026 30	Partick Thistle	0–0	St Johnstone	Glasgow
19:45		Report		Stadium: Firhill Stadium; Attendance: 6,137; Referee: Duncan Nicolson

28 March 2026 31	St Johnstone	1–1	Queen's Park	Perth
15:00	McPake 48'	Report	Murray 32'	Stadium: McDiarmid Park; Attendance: 3,798; Referee: Kevin Clancy

4 April 2026 32	Arbroath	2–4	St Johnstone	Arbroath
15:00	Dow 34'; O'Brien 58'	Report	Gullan 41'; Smith 56'; Fowler 66'; Baird 74'	Stadium: Gayfield Park; Attendance: 2,525; Referee: Lloyd Wilson

11 April 2026 33	St Johnstone	4–0	Airdrieonians	Perth
15:00	Paton 16', 35'; Boyes 34'; McPake 81' (pen.)	Report		Stadium: McDiarmid Park; Attendance: 3,682; Referee: Grant Irvine

21 April 2026 34	Dunfermline Athletic	0–2	St Johnstone	Dunfermline
19:45		Report	McAlear 56'; Paton 73'	Stadium: East End Park; Attendance: 7,691; Referee: Don Robertson

24 April 2026 35	St Johnstone	2–0	Raith Rovers	Perth
19:45	Gullan 21' (pen.), 41'	Report		Stadium: McDiarmid Park; Attendance: 7,729; Referee: Dan McFarlane

1 May 2026 36	Ayr United	0–1	St Johnstone	Ayr
19:45		Report	Fotheringham 37'	Stadium: Somerset Park; Referee: Josh Hay

=== Scottish League Cup ===
==== Group stage ====
12 July 2025 Group stage	East Kilbride	1–3	St Johnstone	East Kilbride
15:00	Robertson 7'	Report	Gullan 52'; Sidibeh 60'; Kirk 81'	Stadium: K-Park Training Academy; Attendance: 690; Referee: Daniel Graves

19 July 2025 Group stage	Inverness CT	0–1	St Johnstone	Inverness
15:00		Report	Ikpeazu 90'	Stadium: Caledonian Stadium; Attendance: 1,585; Referee: Graham Grainger

22 July 2025 Group stage	St Johnstone	3–1	Raith Rovers	Perth
19:45	Gullan 27'; McPake 51'; Kirk 80'	Report	Hamilton 57'	Stadium: McDiarmid Park; Attendance: 3,358; Referee: Greg Soutar

26 July 2025 Group stage	St Johnstone	8–0	Elgin City	Perth
15:00	Tumilty 3'; Kirk 20', 79'; Gullan 42', 45+1'; Stanton 65'; Ikpeazu 78'; Sprangler 84'	Report	Ritchie (red card) 7'	Stadium: McDiarmid Park; Attendance: 2,398; Referee: Peter Stuart

==== Knockout phase ====
16 August 2025 Second round	St Johnstone	0–1 (a.e.t.)	Motherwell	Perth
15:00		Report	Fadinger 109'	Stadium: McDiarmid Park; Attendance: 4,330; Referee: David Dickinson

=== Scottish Challenge Cup ===
16 December 2025 Second round	Heart of Midlothian B	0–1	St Johnstone	Edinburgh
19:45		Report	Gullan 76'	Stadium: Ainslie Park; Referee: Josh Hay
Note: Match postponed due to Storm Bram.

13 January 2026 Third round	St Johnstone	2–0	Ross County	Perth
19:45	McPake 18'; Lloyd 48'	Report		Stadium: McDiarmid Park; Attendance: 1,815; Referee: Grant Irvine

17 February 2026 Quarter-finals	St Johnstone	3–3 (4–5 p)	Ayr United	Falkirk
19:45	McPake 30' (pen.); Smith 89'; Gullan 90+4'	Report	Oakley 15', 29'; Holt 47'	Stadium: Falkirk Stadium; Attendance: 999; Referee: Lloyd Wilson

=== Scottish Cup ===
29 November 2025 Third round	St Johnstone	1–2 (a.e.t.)	Cove Rangers	Perth
15:00	Ikpeazu 24'	Report	Megginson 73'; Emslie 100'	Stadium: McDiarmid Park; Attendance: 2,024; Referee: Chris Graham

== Squad statistics ==
=== Appearances and goals ===
As of 1 May 2026

No.	Pos	Nat	Player	Total		Championship		League Cup		Challenge Cup		Scottish Cup	
No.	Pos	Nat	Player	Apps	Goals	Apps	Goals	Apps	Goals	Apps	Goals	Apps	Goals
1	GK	(England) ENG	Toby Steward	45	0	36	0	5	0	3	0	1	0
2	DF	(Scotland) SCO	Reghan Tumilty	14	1	3+5	0	3+1	1	1	0	1	0
3	DF	(England) ENG	Cheick Diabate	42	3	34	3	3+2	0	2	0	1	0
4	DF	(Wales) WAL	Morgan Boyes	39	1	26+5	1	5	0	2+1	0	0	0
5	DF	(Croatia) CRO	Božo Mikulić	2	0	1	0	0	0	1	0	0	0
6	MF	(Panama) PAN	Víctor Griffith	6	0	0+4	0	0	0	1+1	0	0	0
7	MF	(Scotland) SCO	Jason Holt	42	1	35	1	5	0	2	0	0	0
8	MF	(Sweden) SWE	Jonathan Svedberg	16	0	8+3	0	1+2	0	1+1	0	0	0
9	FW	(England) ENG	Josh Fowler	12	2	5+7	2	0	0	0	0	0	0
10	FW	(Scotland) SCO	Jamie Gullan	41	17	30+3	11	5	4	0+2	2	1	0
11	MF	(Scotland) SCO	Sam Stanton	30	3	16+9	2	0+2	1	3	0	0	0
14	DF	(England) ENG	Matty Foulds	29	1	16+5	1	4	0	3	0	0+1	0
15	DF	(Scotland) SCO	Jack Baird	33	3	24+2	3	3+1	0	2+1	0	0	0
17	FW	(Wales) WAL	Louis Lloyd	8	1	1+4	0	0	0	1+1	1	0+1	0
18	FW	(Republic of Ireland) IRL	Ruari Paton	14	5	10+3	5	0	0	1	0	0	0
19	FW	(Scotland) SCO	Taylor Steven	14	0	1+8	0	1+3	0	1	0	0	0
20	GK	(Scotland) SCO	Ross Sinclair	0	0	0	0	0	0	0	0	0	0
21	FW	(Scotland) SCO	Kai Fotheringham	25	4	12+10	4	0	0	0+2	0	0+1	0
22	MF	(Scotland) SCO	Stevie Mallan	19	1	7+6	1	2+1	0	2	0	1	0
24	MF	(Scotland) SCO	Josh McPake	41	19	33	16	4+1	1	2	2	1	0
27	FW	(Ghana) GHA	Alfredo Agyeman	10	1	2+7	1	0	0	1	0	0	0
33	DF	(Scotland) SCO	Liam Smith	28	4	24+1	3	0	0	1+1	1	1	0
35	DF	(Scotland) SCO	Adam Forrester	19	0	17+2	0	0	0	0	0	0	0
39	GK	(Scotland) SCO	Kyle Thomson	0	0	0	0	0	0	0	0	0	0
42	MF	(Scotland) SCO	Reece McAlear	41	5	34+1	5	3+1	0	1	0	1	0
46	MF	(Poland) POL	Fran Franczak	8	0	0+4	0	1+1	0	1	0	0+1	0
49	MF	(Scotland) SCO	Jack Robetson	1	0	0+1	0	0	0	0	0	0	0
52	DF	(Scotland) SCO	Arran Brookfield	0	0	0	0	0	0	0	0	0	0
Departures
9	FW	(The Gambia) GAM	Adama Sidibeh	26	7	18+1	6	5	1	0+1	0	0+1	0
15	MF	(Ghana) GHA	Aaron Essel	0	0	0	0	0	0	0	0	0	0
18	FW	(Uganda) UGA	Uche Ikpeazu	18	4	0+12	1	0+4	2	0+1	0	1	1
23	MF	(Austria) AUT	Sven Sprangler	20	1	3+10	0	3+2	1	1	0	1	0
27	FW	(Northern Ireland) NIR	Makenzie Kirk	7	4	0+2	0	2+3	4	0	0	0	0
31	GK	(Scotland) SCO	Craig Hepburn	0	0	0	0	0	0	0	0	0	0
37	FW	(Germany) GER	Jannik Wanner	8	0	0+7	0	0	0	1	0	0	0
38	MF	(Scotland) SCO	Scott Bright	3	0	0+2	0	0+1	0	0	0	0	0
45	FW	(Scotland) SCO	Jackson Mylchreest	0	0	0	0	0	0	0	0	0	0
51	FW	(Scotland) SCO	Murray Binnie	0	0	0	0	0	0	0	0	0	0

== Team statistics ==
=== League table ===
Pos	Team	Pld	W	D	L	GF	GA	GD	Pts	Promotion, qualification or relegation
1	St Johnstone (C, P)	36	22	11	3	67	25	+42	77	Promotion to the Premiership
2	Partick Thistle	36	17	15	4	53	36	+17	66	Qualification for the Premiership play-off semi-final
3	Arbroath	36	13	13	10	43	41	+2	52	Qualification for the Premiership play-off quarter-final
4	Dunfermline Athletic	36	14	9	13	52	41	+11	51	Qualification for the Premiership play-off quarter-final
5	Raith Rovers	36	12	9	15	43	42	+1	45	

Rules for classification: 1) Points; 2) Goal difference; 3) Goals scored; 4) Head-to head points; 5) Head-to-head goal difference; 6) Play-off (only for deciding promotion, play-off participation and relegation).
(C) Champions; (P) Promoted

=== League Cup table ===
Pos	Team	Pld	W	PW	PL	L	GF	GA	GD	Pts	Qualification	STJ	RAI	ICT	EKB	ELG
1	St Johnstone	4	4	0	0	0	15	2	+13	12	Qualification for the second round	—	3–1	—	—	8–0
2	Raith Rovers	4	2	0	0	2	13	9	+4	6		—	—	5–1	2–4	—
3	Inverness Caledonian Thistle	4	2	0	0	2	9	8	+1	6		0–1	—	—	—	2–0
4	East Kilbride	4	2	0	0	2	11	12	−1	6		1–3	—	2–6	—	—
5	Elgin City	4	0	0	0	4	2	19	−17	0		—	1–5	—	1–4	—

Rules for classification: 1) goal difference, 2) goals scored, 3) away goals scored, 4) matches won, 5) away matches won, 6) drawing of lots.

== Transfers ==
=== In ===
Date	Player	Transferred from	Fee	Source
1 June 2025	(Scotland) Jack Baird	(Scotland) Greenock Morton	Free	
1 June 2025	(Wales) Morgan Boyes	(Scotland) Greenock Morton	Free	
1 June 2025	(Scotland) Jamie Gullan	(Scotland) Raith Rovers	Free	
17 June 2025	(Scotland) Sam Stanton	(Scotland) Raith Rovers	Free	
17 June 2025	(Scotland) Reghan Tumilty	(Scotland) Hamilton Academical	Free	
3 July 2025	(England) Matty Foulds	(England) Harrogate Town	Free	
7 July 2025	(England) Cheick Diabate	(England) Exeter City	Free	
14 July 2025	(Wales) Louis Lloyd	(Wales) Caernarfon Town	Undisclosed	
17 July 2025	(Scotland) Stevie Mallan	Unattached	Free	
18 July 2025	(Scotland) Reece McAlear	(Scotland) Livingston	Undisclosed	
25 August 2025	(Scotland) Kai Fotheringham	(Scotland) Dundee United	Undisclosed	
27 August 2025	(Scotland) Liam Smith	(Republic of Ireland) Bohemian	Free	
29 January 2026	(England) Josh Fowler	(Scotland) Queen's Park	Undisclosed	

=== Out ===
Date	Player	Transferred to	Fee	Source
19 May 2025	(Republic of Ireland) Graham Carey	(Scotland) Livingston	Free	
19 May 2025	(South Africa) Arran Cocks	(Australia) Broadmeadow Magic	Free	
19 May 2025	(Scotland) Nicky Clark	(Scotland) Ross County	Free	
19 May 2025	(Scotland) Barry Douglas	Retired		
19 May 2025	(Scotland) Alex Ferguson	(Scotland) Kelty Hearts	Free	
19 May 2025	(Sweden) Benjamin Mbunga Kimpioka	(Turkey) Sivasspor	Free	
19 May 2025	(Scotland) Bailey Klimionek	(Scotland) Brechin City	Free	
19 May 2025	(Ukraine) Max Kucheriavyi	(Kazakhstan) Kaspiy Aktau	Free	
19 May 2025	(Scotland) Cammy MacPherson	(Scotland) Greenock Morton	Free	
19 May 2025	(Scotland) Stevie May	(Scotland) Livingston	Free	
19 May 2025	(Northern Ireland) Sam McClelland		Free	
19 May 2025	(Scotland) Ben McCrystal	(England) Berwick Rangers	Free	
19 May 2025	(Scotland) Adam McMillan	(England) Albion Rovers	Free	
19 May 2025	(Scotland) Liam Parker	(Scotland) Cove Rangers	Free	
19 May 2025	(Scotland) Dominic Shiels	(Scotland) Hamilton Academical	Free	
19 May 2025	(Wales) Matthew Smith	(Wales) Newport County	Free	
12 June 2025	(England) Drey Wright	(Scotland) Dundee	Free	
17 June 2025	(Scotland) Josh Rae	(Scotland) Raith Rovers	Free	
19 June 2025	(Latvia) Daniels Balodis	(Slovakia) Tatran Prešov	Free	
15 July 2025	(Trinidad and Tobago) Andre Raymond	(Finland) Ilves	Undisclosed	
16 July 2025	(Scotland) Callan Hamill	(England) Arsenal	Undisclosed	
1 September 2025	(Northern Ireland) Makenzie Kirk	(England) Portsmouth	Undisclosed	
27 January 2026	(The Gambia) Adama Sidibeh	(England) Stockport County	Undisclosed	
2 February 2026	(Uganda) Uche Ikpeazu	(Scotland) Ross County	Free	
3 February 2026	(Scotland) Jackson Mylchreest	(Scotland) East Kilbride	Free	

=== Loans in ===
Date	Player	Transferred from	Source
8 July 2025	(England) Toby Steward	(England) Portsmouth	
7 August 2025	(Scotland) Adam Forrester	(Scotland) Heart of Midlothian	
9 September 2025	(Germany) Jannik Wanner	(Scotland) Livingston	
20 January 2026	(Ghana) Alfredo Agyeman	(Scotland) Falkirk	
2 February 2026	(Republic of Ireland) Ruari Paton	(England) Port Vale	

=== Loans out ===
Date	Player	Transferred to	Source
18 July 2025	(Scotland) Craig Hepburn	(Scotland) Brechin City	
28 July 2025	(Scotland) Murray Binnie	(Scotland) Jeanfield Swifts	
15 August 2025	(Scotland) Jackson Mylchreest	(Scotland) Cove Rangers	
29 August 2025	(Scotland) Taylor Steven	(Scotland) Arbroath	
10 September 2025	(Scotland) Scott Bright	(Scotland) Forfar Athletic	
6 January 2026	(Scotland) Craig Hepburn	(Scotland) East Kilbride	
2 February 2026	(Austria) Sven Sprangler	(Wales) Newport County	
23 April 2026	(Scotland) Ross Sinclair	(Scotland) St Mirren	

== See also ==
- List of St Johnstone F.C. seasons
