= List of St Johnstone F.C. seasons =

Football club seasonal record

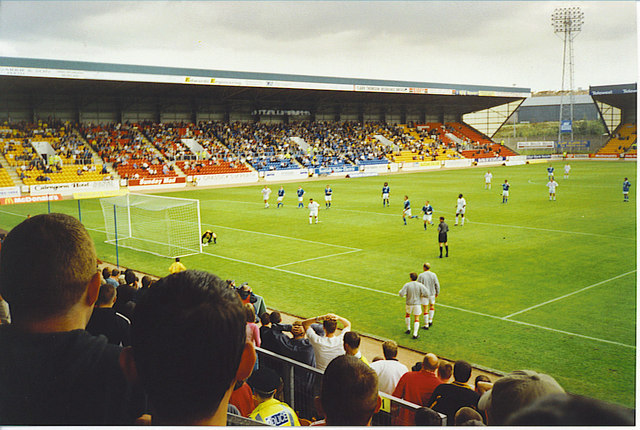
McDiarmid Park

St Johnstone Football Club is a Scottish professional association football club based in Perth. The club was officially formed in 1884 and the team played its first game in February 1885. St Johnstone first appeared in the Scottish Cup in the 1886–87 season and they joined the Scottish Football League in 1911–12. The club has had three home grounds, the current one since 1989 is McDiarmid Park.

St Johnstone have won three major honours. Their first was the Scottish Cup, winning the 2014 final with a 2–0 win against Dundee United. They then won a domestic cup double in 2021 by winning 1–0 in both the 2021 Scottish Cup final and the 2020–21 Scottish League League Cup. They are the fourth existing Scottish team (with Aberdeen , Celtic and Rangers) to achieve that double. St Johnstone's highest placing in the league is third (three times, most recently in 2013). They have qualified for either the UEFA Cup or the Europa League in eight seasons; these include four consecutive seasons from 2013 to 2016.

St Johnstone have spent 54 seasons to 2024–25 in the top tier of the Scottish football league system, including a run of 16 seasons (four in the Scottish Premier League and twelve since 2013 in the Scottish Premiership) since their most recent promotion in 2008–09. They have spent 44 seasons in the second tier and four in the third. The table summarises their seasons from 1886–87 in Scottish and European football. It highlights the club's achievements in senior first team competitions and names, where known, the top goalscorer(s) in each season. Some seasons to 1921–22 and the wartime seasons 1915–19 and 1939–45, in which the club did not compete in top-level football (e.g., Scottish Football League, Scottish Cup), are excluded.

== Key ==
- D1 = Scottish Football League First Division (first tier to 1975)
- PD = Scottish Football League Premier Division (first tier from 1975 to 1998)
- PL = Scottish Premier League (first tier from 1998 to 2013)
- SP = Scottish Premiership (first tier from 2013)
- D2 = Scottish Football League Second Division (second tier to 1975)
- FD = Scottish Football League First Division (second tier from 1975 to 2013)
- SD = Scottish Football League Second Division (third tier from 1975 to 2013)
- DB = Southern League B Division
- P = Games played
- W = Games won
- D = Games drawn
- L = Games lost
- F = Goals for
- A = Goals against
- Pts = Points
- Pos = Final position
- Grp = Group stage
- PO = Play-offs
- 1QR = 1st qualifying round
- 2QR = 2nd qualifying round
- 3QR = 3rd qualifying round
- R1 = Round 1
- R2 = Round 2
- R3 = Round 3
- R4 = Round 4
- R5 = Round 5
- R6 = Round 6
- QF = Quarter-finals
- SF = Semi-finals
- RU = Runners-up

== Seasons ==
The table is correct to the end of the 2025–26 season.

Seasons in which the team were promoted have the league position in green. Seasons in which the team were relegated have the league position in red. (Note: Goal tallies are listed if known and are for the league competitions only. Divisions are not sorted alphabetically, but based on their placing in the Scottish football league system at that time.) (Note: In league matches, a win was worth 2 points until the 1993–94 season, after which it has been 3 points for a win.)

List of seasons, including league division and statistics, cup results, and league top scorer
Season	League record									Scottish Cup	League Cup	Europa League	Top league scorer(s)	
Season	Division	P	W	D	L	F	A	Pts	Pos	Scottish Cup	League Cup	Europa League	Name	Goals
1886–87 (Note: St Johnstone's home ground from 1885 to 1924 was the Recreation Grounds, Perth.)	–	–	–	–	–	–	–	–	–	R1	–	–		
1887–88	–	–	–	–	–	–	–	–	–	R2	–	–		
1888–89	–	–	–	–	–	–	–	–	–	R1	–	–		
1889–90	–	–	–	–	–	–	–	–	–	R2	–	–		
1890–91	–	–	–	–	–	–	–	–	–	R2	–	–		
1895–96	–	–	–	–	–	–	–	–	–	R2	–	–		
1900–01	–	–	–	–	–	–	–	–	–	R1	–	–		
1902–03	–	–	–	–	–	–	–	–	–	R1	–	–		
1903–04	–	–	–	–	–	–	–	–	–	R2	–	–		
1904–05	–	–	–	–	–	–	–	–	–	R1	–	–		
1906–07	–	–	–	–	–	–	–	–	–	R1	–	–		
1907–08	–	–	–	–	–	–	–	–	–	R1	–	–		
1908–09	–	–	–	–	–	–	–	–	–	R1	–	–		
1911–12	D2 (Note: St Johnstone joined Division Two of the Scottish Football League in 1911–12 after Port Glasgow Athletic F.C. declined to apply for re-election.)	22	10	4	8	29	27	24	5th	R1	–	–		
1912–13	D2	26	7	7	12	29	38	21	11th	R3	–	–		
1913–14	D2	22	9	5	8	48	38	23	5th	–	–	–		
1914–15	D2	26	10	6	10	56	53	26	8th	–	–	–		
1919–20 (Note: Division Two was not played in 1919–20 and the club competed in the Scottish Cup only at top-level.)	–	–	–	–	–	–	–	–	–	R2	–	–		
1921–22	D2	38	12	11	15	41	52	35	13th	R1	–	–		
1922–23	D2	38	19	12	7	60	39	48	3rd	R1	–	–		
1923–24	D2	38	22	12	4	79	33	56	1st	R2	–	–		
1924–25 (Note: St Johnstone's home ground from 1924 to 1989 was Muirton Park.)	D1 (Note: St Johnstone first qualified for Division One of the Scottish Football League in 1924–25 after winning Division Two in 1923–24. Between 1890 and 1975, the Division One was the highest tier in Scottish football.)	38	12	11	15	57	72	35	11th	R1	–	–		
1925–26	D1	38	9	10	19	43	78	28	18th	R3	–	–		
1926–27	D1	38	13	9	16	55	69	35	14th	R1	–	–		
1927–28	D1	38	14	8	16	66	67	36	11th	R1	–	–		
1928–29	D1	38	14	10	14	57	70	38	9th	R2	–	–		
1929–30	D1	38	6	7	25	48	96	19	20th	R2	–	–		
1930–31	D2	38	19	6	13	76	61	44	5th	R2	–	–		
1931–32	D2	38	24	7	7	102	52	55	2nd	R2	–	–		
1932–33	D1	38	17	10	11	70	55	44	5th	R3	–	–		
1933–34	D1	38	17	6	15	74	53	40	9th	SF	–	–		
1934–35	D1	38	18	10	10	66	46	46	5th	R4	–	–		
1935–36	D1	38	15	7	16	70	81	37	7th	R3	–	–		
1936–37	D1	38	14	8	16	74	68	36	12th	R2	–	–		
1937–38	D1	38	16	7	15	78	81	39	8th	R2	–	–		
1938–39	D1	38	17	6	15	85	82	40	8th	R1	–	–		
1945–46	DB (Note: In 1945–46, St Johnstone played in the Southern Football League (Scotland), a wartime regional league that defined the Scottish Football League structure when it recommenced in 1946–47. As St Johnstone were allocated to Division B of the regional league, the club having been inactive during the war, the team was effectively relegated to the lower tier between 1938–39 and 1946–47.)	26	12	6	8	66	60	30	6th	–	–	–		
1946–47	DB	26	9	4	13	45	47	22	9th	R1	Grp	–		
1947–48	DB	30	11	5	14	69	63	27	9th	R2	Grp	–		
1948–49	DB	30	14	4	12	58	51	32	6th	R1	Grp	–		
1949–50	DB	30	15	6	9	64	56	36	4th	R2	Grp	–		
1950–51	DB	30	14	5	11	68	53	33	5th	R2	Grp	–		
1951–52	DB	30	9	7	14	62	68	25	11th	R2	QF	–		
1952–53	DB	30	8	6	16	41	63	22	14th	R2	QF	–		
1953–54	DB	30	14	3	13	80	71	31	6th	R1	Grp	–		
1954–55	DB	30	15	2	13	60	51	32	7th	R6	QF	–		
1955–56	D2	36	21	7	8	86	45	49	3rd	R5	QF	–		
1956–57	D2	36	14	6	16	79	80	34	12th	R5	Grp	–		
1957–58	D2	36	12	9	15	67	85	33	11th	R2	Grp	–		
1958–59	D2	36	15	10	11	54	44	40	6th	R3	Grp	–		
1959–60	D2	36	24	5	7	87	47	53	1st	R1	Grp	–		
1960–61	D1	34	10	9	15	47	63	29	15th	R1	Grp	–	Matthew McVitie	8
1961–62	D1	34	9	7	18	35	61	25	17th	R2	SF	–	Alex Ferguson	5
1962–63	D2	36	25	5	6	83	37	55	1st	R2	SF	–		
1963–64	D1	34	11	6	17	54	70	28	13th	R2	PO	–		
1964–65	D1	34	9	11	14	57	62	29	13th	R2	Grp	–		
1965–66	D1	34	9	8	17	58	81	26	14th	R3	Grp	–		
1966–67	D1	34	10	5	19	53	73	25	15th	R2	Grp	–		
1967–68	D1	34	10	7	17	43	52	27	14th	SF	SF	–		
1968–69	D1	34	16	5	13	66	59	37	6th	R3	Grp	–		
1969–70	D1	34	11	9	14	50	62	31	13th	R1	RU	–	Henry Hall	15
1970–71	D1	34	19	6	9	59	44	44	3rd	R3	Grp	–		
1971–72	D1	34	12	8	14	52	58	32	8th	R3	QF	3QR		
1972–73	D1	34	10	9	15	52	67	29	11th	R3	QF	–		
1973–74	D1	34	9	10	15	41	60	28	12th	R4	R2	–		
1974–75	D1	34	11	12	11	41	44	34	10th (Note: The top-ten placed teams in 1974–75 formed the new Scottish Football League Premier Division (PD) for next season.)	R4	Grp	–		
1975–76	PD (Note: The Scottish Football League Premier Division was, from 1975 until 1998, the top division of the Scottish Football League, replacing the old Division One.)	36	3	5	28	29	79	11	10th	R3	Grp	–	Jim O'Rourke	8
1976–77	FD (Note: The new Scottish Football League First Division (FD) was the second tier in the Scottish football league system between 1975 and 2013.)	39	8	13	18	42	64	29	11th	R3	Grp	–	Iain Anderson	8
1977–78	FD	39	15	6	18	52	64	36	8th	R4	R2	–	Derek O'Connor	19
1978–79	FD	39	10	11	18	57	66	31	12th	R3	R1	–	John Brogan	14
1979–80	FD	39	12	10	17	57	74	34	11th	R3	R3	–	John Brogan	22
1980–81	FD	39	20	11	8	64	45	51	3rd	R4	R1	–	Ally McCoist	22
1981–82	FD	39	17	8	14	69	60	42	5th	R4	Grp	–	Jim Morton	17
1982–83	FD	39	25	5	9	59	37	55	1st	R4	Grp	–	John Brogan	26
1983–84	PD	36	10	3	23	36	81	23	9th	R3	Grp	–	John Brogan	9
1984–85	FD	39	10	5	24	51	78	25	14th	R3	QF	–	Joe Reid	9
1985–86	SD (Note: The Scottish Football League Second Division (SD) was the third tier of the Scottish football league system between 1975 and 2013.)	39	18	6	15	63	55	42	6th	R3	R3	–	Willie Brown	11
1986–87	SD	39	16	13	10	59	49	45	5th	R3	R4	–	Willie Brown	25
1987–88	SD	39	25	9	5	74	24	59	2nd	R3	R3	–	Willie Watters	19
1988–89	FD	39	14	12	13	51	42	40	6th	SF	R2	–	Steve Maskrey	12
1989–90 (Note: St Johnstone's home ground since 1989 is McDiarmid Park which currently has an all-seated capacity of 10,696.)	FD	39	25	8	6	81	39	58	1st	R3	R2	–	Roddy Grant	19
1990–91	PD	36	11	9	16	41	54	31	7th	SF	R2	–	Harry Curran	9
1991–92	PD	44	13	10	21	52	73	36	8th	R5	R3	–	Paul Wright	18
1992–93	PD	44	10	20	14	52	66	40	6th	R5	SF	–	Paul Wright	14
1993–94	PD	44	10	20	14	35	47	40	10th	R5	R3	–	Paul Wright	7
1994–95	FD	36	14	14	8	59	39	56	5th	R3	QF	–	George O'Boyle	19
1995–96	FD	36	19	8	9	60	36	65	4th	R5	R2	–	George O'Boyle	21
1996–97	FD	36	24	8	4	74	23	80	1st	R3	R3	–	Roddy Grant	19
1997–98	PD	36	13	9	14	38	42	48	5th	R5	R3	–	George O'Boyle	10
1998–99	PL (Note: The Scottish Premier Division was renamed the Scottish Premier League (PL) in 1998–99.)	36	15	12	9	39	38	57	3rd	SF	RU	–	Gary Bollan; Roddy Grant; Miguel Simão	4
1999–2000	PL	36	10	12	14	36	44	42	5th	R3	R3	1QR	Nathan Lowndes	10
2000–01	PL	38	9	13	16	40	56	40	10th	R3	R3	–	Keigan Parker	10
2001–02	PL	38	5	6	27	24	62	21	12th	R3	R3	–	Paul Hartley	4
2002–03	FD	36	20	7	9	49	29	67	3rd	R4	R3	–	Chris Hay	9
2003–04	FD	36	15	12	9	59	45	57	3rd	R3	QF	–	Mixu Paatelainen	11
2004–05	FD	36	12	10	14	38	39	46	8th	R3	R1	–	Peter MacDonald	11
2005–06	FD	36	18	12	6	59	34	66	2nd	R3	R2	–	Jason Scotland	15
2006–07	FD	36	19	8	9	65	42	65	2nd	SF	SF	–	Jason Scotland	18
2007–08	FD	36	15	13	8	60	45	58	3rd	SF	R2	–	Andy Jackson	14
2008–09	FD	36	17	14	5	55	35	65	1st	R4	R2	–	Steve Milne	14
2009–10	PL	38	12	11	15	57	61	47	8th	R5	SF	–	Liam Craig	8
2010–11	PL	38	11	11	16	23	43	44	8th	SF	R3	–	Liam Craig	6
2011–12	PL	38	14	8	16	43	50	50	6th	R3	R2	–	Francisco Sandaza	14
2012–13	PL	38	14	14	10	45	44	56	3rd	R5	QF	2QR	Liam Craig; Murray Davidson; Nigel Hasselbaink; Rowan Vine	7
2013–14	SP (Note: The Scottish Premier League was renamed the Scottish Premiership (SP) in 2013–14.)	38	15	8	15	48	42	53	6th	W	SF	3QR	Stevie May	20
2014–15	SP	38	16	9	13	34	34	57	4th	R5	QF	3QR	Brian Graham; Michael O'Halloran	9
2015–16	SP	38	16	8	14	58	55	56	4th	R4	SF	1QR	Steven MacLean	14
2016–17	SP	38	17	7	14	50	46	58	4th	R5	QF	–	Danny Swanson	10
2017–18	SP	38	12	10	16	42	53	46	8th	R5	R2	1QR	Steven MacLean	9
2018–19	SP	38	15	7	16	38	48	52	7th	R5	QF	–	Matty Kennedy	6
2019–20	SP	30	8	12	9	28	46	45	6th	QF	Grp	–	Callum Hendry	7
2020–21	SP	38	11	12	15	36	46	45	5th	W	W	–	Stevie May	9
2021–22	SP	38	8	11	19	24	51	35	11th	R4	SF	3QR	Callum Hendry	9
2022–23	SP	38	12	7	19	41	59	43	9th	R4	Grp	–	Stevie May	10
2023-24	SP	38	8	11	19	38	67	35	10th	R4	Grp	–	Nicky Clark	6
2024-25	SP	38	9	5	24	38	68	32	12th	SF	R2	–	Makenzie Kirk	8
2025-26	SC	36	22	11	3	67	25	77	1st	R3	R2	–	Josh McPake	16
