= United States men's national water polo 4x4 team =

- FINA code: USA
- Association: USA Water Polo
- Confederation: UANA (Americas)
- Head coach: Ross Sinclair

World Championship
- Appearances: 1 (first in 2026)
- Best result: 6th (2026)

Media
- Website: usawaterpolo.org

The United States men's national water polo 4x4 team represents the United States in men's World Aquatics Water Polo 4x4 Open Championships. It is the inaugural tournament held in 2026.

== Format ==
The event have a new four-on-four format, it features four players per team, a smaller field of play and a shorter shot clock, creating a fast-paced and engaging style of play. This format is adaptable to both open water and urban areas.

== Results ==
=== Major tournaments ===
==== Competitive record ====
Tournament	Appearances	Finishes				
Tournament	Appearances	Champions	Runners-up	Third place	Fourth place	Total
World Championship	1	0	0	0	0	0
Total	1	0	0	0	0	0

==== World Championship ====
Year	Result	Pld	W	L	D	SW	SL
(Croatia) 2026	6th place	7	3	4	0	16	13
Total	0 Title	7	3	4	0	16	13

== Team ==
=== Current squad ===
Roster for the 2026 World Championship.

Head coach: Ross Sinclair

- Jake Howerton
- Max Irving
- Carson Kranz
- JP Ohl
- AJ Rossman
- Marko Vavic
- Stefan Vavic
- Chris Whitelegge
