= Sven Sprangler =

Austrian footballer

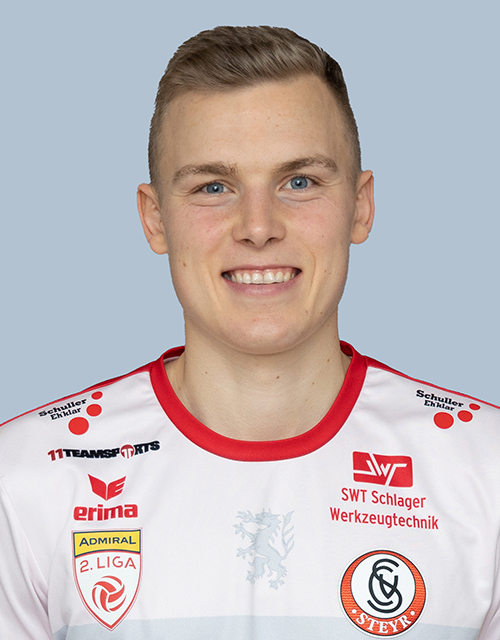
- Sven Sprangler in 2021

Personal information
- Full name: Sven Michael Sprangler
- Date of birth: 27 March 1995 (age 31)
- Place of birth: Bruck an der Mur, Austria
- Height: 1.82 m (6 ft 0 in)
- Position: Midfielder

Team information
- Current team: Walsall
- Number: 6

Youth career
- Birkfeld
- Weiz
- SV Anger
- AKA Burgenland

Senior career*
| Years | Team | Apps | (Gls) |
| 2012–2015 | SV Mattersburg II | 53 | (2) |
| 2013–2017 | SV Mattersburg | 92 | (3) |
| 2017–2018 | TSV Hartberg | 35 | (0) |
| 2018–2022 | Wolfsberger AC | 54 | (0) |
| 2023 | SK Vorwärts Steyr | 12 | (1) |
| 2023–2026 | St Johnstone | 66 | (0) |
| 2026 | → Newport County (loan) | 18 | (0) |
| 2026– | Walsall | 3 | (0) |
- * Club domestic league appearances and goals as of 13:13, 27 June 2026 (UTC)

Sven Michael Sprangler (born 27 March 1995) is an Austrian footballer who plays for EFL League Two club Walsall.

== Career ==
Sprangler signed a two-year contract with Scottish club St Johnstone in September 2023. In May 2025 he signed a two-year extension with St Johnstone.

On 2 February 2026, Sprangler joined EFL League Two club Newport County on loan for the remainder of the 2025–26 season. He made his Newport debut in the starting line-up for the EFL League Two 0–0 draw against Grimsby Town on 7 February 2026.

On 27 June 2026, Sprangler returned to League Two, joining Walsall on a two-year deal for an undisclosed fee.

== Career statistics ==
As of match played 2 November 2026

Appearances and goals by club, season and competition
| Club | Season | League | | | National Cup | | League Cup | | Other | | Total | |
| Club | Season | Division | Apps | Goals | Apps | Goals | Apps | Goals | Apps | Goals | Apps | Goals |
|---|---|---|---|---|---|---|---|---|---|---|---|---|
| SV Mattersburg II | 2011–12 | Austrian Regionalliga East | 2 | 0 | 0 | 0 | 0 | 0 | 0 | 0 | 2 | 0 |
| SV Mattersburg II | 2012–13 | Austrian Regionalliga East | 27 | 1 | 0 | 0 | 0 | 0 | 0 | 0 | 27 | 1 |
| SV Mattersburg II | 2013–14 | Austrian Regionalliga East | 4 | 0 | 0 | 0 | 0 | 0 | 0 | 0 | 4 | 0 |
| SV Mattersburg II | 2014–15 | Austrian Regionalliga East | 2 | 0 | 0 | 0 | 0 | 0 | 0 | 0 | 2 | 0 |
| SV Mattersburg II | 2015–16 | Landesliga Burgenland | 5 | 1 | 0 | 0 | 0 | 0 | 0 | 0 | 5 | 1 |
| SV Mattersburg II | 2016–17 | Landesliga Burgenland | 13 | 0 | 0 | 0 | 0 | 0 | 2 (Note: Appearances in Regionalliga Relegation Play off) | 0 | 13 | 0 |
| SV Mattersburg II | Total | | 53 | 2 | 0 | 0 | 0 | 0 | 2 | 0 | 55 | 2 |
| SV Mattersburg | 2013–14 | 2. Liga | 24 | 0 | 1 (Note: Appearances in OFB Cup) | 0 | 0 | 0 | 0 | 0 | 25 | 0 |
| SV Mattersburg | 2014–15 | 2. Liga | 33 | 3 | 2 | 0 | 0 | 0 | 0 | 0 | 35 | 0 |
| SV Mattersburg | 2015–16 | Bundesliga | 21 | 0 | 3 | 1 | 0 | 0 | 0 | 0 | 24 | 0 |
| SV Mattersburg | 2016–17 | Bundesliga | 14 | 0 | 2 | 0 | 0 | 0 | 0 | 0 | 16 | 0 |
| SV Mattersburg | Total | | 92 | 3 | 8 | 1 | 0 | 0 | 0 | 0 | 100 | 4 |
| TSV Hartberg | 2017–18 | 2. Liga | 35 | 0 | 2 | 0 | 0 | 0 | 0 | 0 | 37 | 0 |
| Wolfsberger AC II | 2018–19 | Austrian Regionalliga Central | 1 | 0 | 0 | 0 | 0 | 0 | 0 | 0 | 1 | 0 |
| Wolfsberger AC II | 2019–20 | Austrian Regionalliga Central | 1 | 2 | 0 | 0 | 0 | 0 | 0 | 0 | 1 | 2 |
| Wolfsberger AC II | 2021–22 | Austrian Regionalliga Central | 3 | 0 | 0 | 0 | 0 | 0 | 0 | 0 | 3 | 0 |
| Wolfsberger AC II | Total | | 5 | 2 | 0 | 0 | 0 | 0 | 0 | 0 | 5 | 2 |
| Wolfsberger AC | 2018–19 | Bundesliga | 19 | 0 | 3 | 0 | 0 | 0 | 0 | 0 | 20 | 0 |
| Wolfsberger AC | 2019–20 | Bundesliga | 13 | 0 | 2 | 0 | 0 | 0 | 1 (Note: Appearances in UEFA Europa League) | 0 | 16 | 0 |
| Wolfsberger AC | 2020–21 | Bundesliga | 13 | 0 | 3 | 0 | 0 | 0 | 4 | 0 | 20 | 0 |
| Wolfsberger AC | 2021–22 | Bundesliga | 9 | 0 | 1 | 0 | 0 | 0 | 0 | 0 | 10 | 0 |
| Wolfsberger AC | Total | | 54 | 0 | 9 | 0 | 0 | 0 | 5 | 0 | 68 | 0 |
| SK Vorwärts Steyr | 2022–23 | 2. Liga | 12 | 1 | 0 | 0 | 0 | 0 | 0 | 0 | 12 | 1 |
| St Johnstone | 2023–24 | Scottish Premiership | 19 | 0 | 1 (Note: appearances in Scottish Cup) | 0 | 0 | 0 | 0 | 0 | 20 | 0 |
| St Johnstone | 2024–25 | Scottish Premiership | 33 | 0 | 4 | 0 | 1 (Note: appearances in Scottish League Cup) | 0 | 0 | 0 | 38 | 0 |
| St Johnstone | 2025–26 | Scottish Championship | 14 | 0 | 1 | 0 | 5 | 1 | 1 (Note: appearances in Scottish Challenge Cup) | 0 | 21 | 1 |
| St Johnstone | Total | | 66 | 0 | 6 | 0 | 6 | 1 | 1 | 0 | 79 | 1 |
| Newport County.(loan) | 2025–26 | EFL League Two | 18 | 0 | 0 | 0 | 0 | 0 | 0 | 0 | 18 | 0 |
| Walsall | 2026–27 | EFL League Two | 13 | 0 | 0 | 0 | 1 (Note: appearances in EFL Cup) | 0 | 1 (Note: appearances in EFL Trophy) | 0 | 15 | 0 |
| Career Total | | | 348 | 8 | 25 | 1 | 7 | 0 | 9 | 0 | 389 | 9 |

== Honours ==
St Johnstone

- Scottish Championship: 2025–26
