= Adama Sidibeh =

Gambian footballer

Personal information
- Full name: Adama Sidibeh
- Date of birth: 25 June 1998 (age 28)
- Place of birth: The Gambia
- Height: 1.73 m (5 ft 8 in)
- Position: Striker

Team information
- Current team: Stockport County
- Number: 29

Youth career
- Soccer Boys Football Academy

Senior career*
Years	Team	Apps	(Gls)
- Marimoo
- Gambia Ports Authority
2022	AFC Blackpool	2	(0)
2022–2023	Cheadle Heath Nomads	19	(20)
2023–2024	Warrington Rylands 1906	26	(15)
2024–2026	St. Johnstone	65	(14)
2026–	Stockport County	21	(7)

International career^{‡}
2024–	Gambia	10	(7)
- * Club domestic league appearances and goals as of 24 October 2026 (UTC) ‡ National team caps and goals as of 31 March 2026 (UTC)

Adama Sidibeh (born 25 June 1998) is a Gambian professional footballer who plays as a striker for EFL League One club Stockport County and the Gambia national team.

== Club career ==
=== Early career ===
Sidibeh began his football career in his native Gambia, playing for Marimoo and Gambia Ports Authority prior to his move to England in 2022 to reunite with his family.

In October 2022, Sidibeh joined North West Counties League Division One North club AFC Blackpool. After a short spell with the club, he joined Cheadle Heath Nomads in December 2022.

On 11 July 2023, Sidibeh signed with Warrington Rylands 1906, scoring 16 goals in 30 appearances.

=== St Johnstone ===
On 1 February 2024, Sidibeh signed his first full-time deal with Scottish club, St Johnstone. He made his debut for the club on 3 February 2024, in a 1–0 win against Ross County. He scored his first goal for the club on 30 March 2024, in a 2–1 defeat to Dundee.

=== Stockport County ===
On 27 January 2026, Sidibeh joined League One club Stockport County on a two-and-a-half year deal for an undisclosed fee. He made his debut for the club on 27 January 2026, in a 2–1 win against Blackpool. He scored his first goals for the club on 10 February 2026, netting twice in a 4–0 win against Port Vale in the EFL Trophy.

== International career ==
Sidibeh made his international debut for Gambia in a 5–1 win against Seychelles in June 2024, scoring in the 78th minute.

== Career statistics ==
=== Club ===
As of match played 24 October 2026

Appearances and goals by club, season and competition
Club	Season	League			National Cup (Note: Includes FA Cup, Scottish Cup)		League Cup (Note: Includes EFL Cup, Scottish League Cup)		Other		Total	
Club	Season	Division	Apps	Goals	Apps	Goals	Apps	Goals	Apps	Goals	Apps	Goals
Warrington Rylands 1906	2023–24	Northern Premier League	26	15	3	1	—		1 (Note: Appearances in FA Trophy)	0	30	16
St Johnstone	2023–24	Scottish Premiership	15	5	0	0	0	0	—		15	5
St Johnstone	2024–25	Scottish Premiership	31	3	3	1	5	2	—		39	6
St Johnstone	2025–26	Scottish Championship	19	6	1	0	5	1	1 (Note: Appearances in Scottish Challenge Cup)	0	26	7
St Johnstone	Total		65	14	4	1	10	3	1	0	80	18
Stockport County	2025–26	League One	19	6	0	0	0	0	6 (Note: Three appearances and three goals in the EFL Trophy, three appearances and one goal in the EFL League One play-offs)	4	25	10
Stockport County	2026–27	League One	2	1	0	0	0	0	0	0	2	1
Stockport County	Total		21	7	0	0	0	0	6	4	27	11
Career total			112	36	7	2	10	3	8	4	137	45

=== International ===
As of matches played 4 June 2026

Appearances and goals by national team and year
National team	Year	Apps	Goals
Gambia	2024	4	1
Gambia	2025	5	6
Gambia	2026	1	0
Total		10	7

Scores and results list Gambia's goal tally first.

List of international goals scored by Adama Sidibeh
No	Date	Venue	Opponent	Score	Result	Competition
1	8 June 2024	Berkane Municipal Stadium, Berkane, Morocco	Seychelles	5–1	5–1	2026 FIFA World Cup qualification
2	6 June 2025	Marrakesh Stadium, Marrakesh, Morocco	Equatorial Guinea	1–0	2–1	Friendly
3	6 June 2025	Marrakesh Stadium, Marrakesh, Morocco	Equatorial Guinea	2–0	2–1	Friendly
4	10 October 2025	Moi International Sports Centre, Nairobi, Kenya	Gabon	2–2	3–4	2026 FIFA World Cup qualification
5	10 October 2025	Moi International Sports Centre, Nairobi, Kenya	Gabon	3–2	3–4	2026 FIFA World Cup qualification
6	14 October 2025	Côte d'Or National Sports Complex, Saint Pierre, Mauritius	Seychelles	1–0	7–0	2026 FIFA World Cup qualification
7	14 October 2025	Côte d'Or National Sports Complex, Saint Pierre, Mauritius	Seychelles	3–0	7–0	2026 FIFA World Cup qualification

== Honours ==
Stockport County

- EFL Trophy runner-up: 2025–26

St Johnstone

- Scottish Championship: 2025–26
