= Liam Smith (footballer, born 1996) =

Scottish footballer (born 1996)

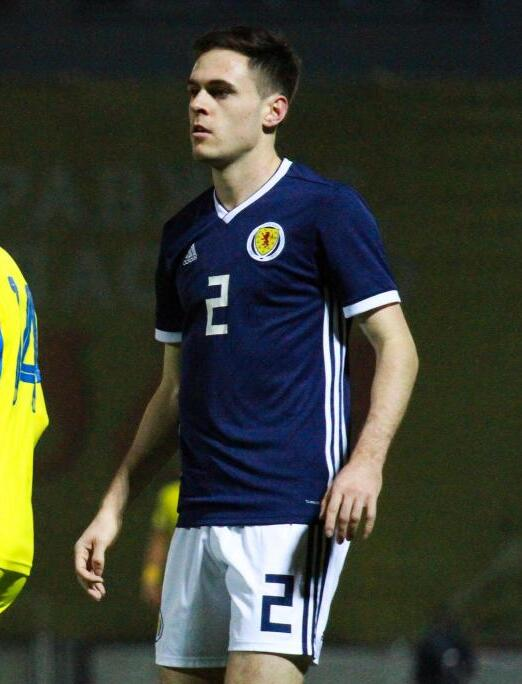

Personal information
- Date of birth: 10 April 1996 (age 30)
- Place of birth: Dalgety Bay, Scotland
- Height: 5 ft 10 in (1.79 m)
- Position: Right-back

Team information
- Current team: St Johnstone
- Number: 33

Youth career
- 2006–2010: Rangers
- 2010–2015: Heart of Midlothian

Senior career*
Years	Team	Apps	(Gls)
2014–2018	Heart of Midlothian	30	(0)
2014–2015	→ East Fife (loan)	21	(1)
2016	→ Raith Rovers (loan)	2	(0)
2017–2018	→ St Mirren (loan)	32	(2)
2018–2019	Ayr United	33	(1)
2019–2023	Dundee United	106	(4)
2023–2024	Cheltenham Town	13	(0)
2024	→ Grimsby Town (loan)	11	(1)
2024–2025	Bohemians	23	(0)
2025–	St Johnstone	25	(3)

International career
2015	Scotland U19	1	(0)
2016–2018	Scotland U21	12	(0)
- * Club domestic league appearances and goals as of 4 May 2026

Liam Smith (born 10 April 1996) is a Scottish professional footballer who plays as a right-back for Scottish Premiership club St Johnstone. He has previously played for Heart of Midlothian, East Fife, Raith Rovers, St Mirren, Ayr United, Dundee United, Cheltenham Town, Grimsby Town and Bohemians.

== Career ==
=== Hearts ===
Smith began his career as a youth player at Hillfield Swifts Boys Club, before joining Rangers aged 10. Having been released by Rangers aged 14, Smith joined Heart of Midlothian (Hearts). Smith signed a 2-year professional contract in July 2014, extending his stay with the club until at least 2016. Aged 18 he made his first team debut on 20 August 2014, in the second round of the Scottish Challenge Cup away to Livingston, playing from the start in a 4–1 loss. Smith made one more appearance that season before being loaned to Scottish League Two side East Fife until the end of January 2015. He made his league debut on 30 August 2014, against East Stirlingshire in a 3–1 win, with his first goal coming against Queen's Park on 20 September salvaging a 2–2 draw. Smith's loan deal was later extended until the end of the season. In all he made 23 appearances for East Fife, scoring once.

On his return to Hearts Smith made his Scottish Premiership debut on 18 October, coming on as a 71st-minute substitute against Dundee United at Tannadice Park, replacing Juwon Oshaniwa in a 1–0 win.

==== Raith Rovers loan ====
On 24 September 2016, it was announced that Smith had signed on loan at Raith Rovers for a month. He was recalled by Hearts on 29 October 2016.

==== St Mirren loan ====
On 14 August 2017, Smith signed a season-long loan deal with Scottish Championship club St Mirren. It proved to be a successful loan spell as Saints won the Scottish Championship, with Smith playing 34 games and scoring twice. Smith was also part of the PFA Scotland Championship Team of the Year.

=== Ayr United ===
Smith signed a one-year contract with Ayr United in August 2018.

=== Dundee United ===
On 16 April 2019, Dundee United confirmed that Smith had signed a pre-contract to join the club in the summer, agreeing a two-year deal. Following relegation to the Scottish Championship in the 2022–23 season, Smith was released by United at the end of the season.

=== Cheltenham Town ===
On 20 July 2023, Smith signed for Cheltenham Town, following a successful trial with the club.

==== Grimsby Town loan ====
On 1 February 2024, Smith joined League Two club Grimsby Town on loan until the end of the season.

=== Bohemians ===
On 12 July 2024, he signed for League of Ireland Premier Division side Bohemians.

=== St Johnstone ===
On 27 August 2025, Smith signed for Scottish Championship side St Johnstone on a one-year contract.

== Career statistics ==
As of match played 18 October 2025

Appearances and goals by club, season and competition
Club	Season	League			National cup (Note: Includes Scottish Cup, FAI Cup)		League cup (Note: Includes Scottish League Cup, EFL Cup)		Other		Total	
Club	Season	Division	Apps	Goals	Apps	Goals	Apps	Goals	Apps	Goals	Apps	Goals
Heart of Midlothian	2014–15	Scottish Championship	0	0	0	0	1	0	1 (Note: Appearances in Scottish Challenge Cup)	0	2	0
Heart of Midlothian	2015–16	Scottish Premiership	10	0	0	0	1	0	0	0	11	0
Heart of Midlothian	2016–17	Scottish Premiership	20	0	1	0	1	0	3 (Note: Appearances in UEFA Europa League)	0	25	0
Heart of Midlothian	2017–18	Scottish Premiership	0	0	0	0	0	0	—		0	0
Heart of Midlothian	Total		30	0	1	0	3	0	4	0	38	0
East Fife (loan)	2014–15	Scottish League Two	21	1	0	0	0	0	2 (Note: Appearances in Scottish League Two play-offs)	0	23	1
Raith Rovers (loan)	2016–17	Scottish Championship	2	0	0	0	0	0	0	0	2	0
St Mirren (loan)	2017–18	Scottish Championship	32	2	1	0	0	0	1	0	34	2
Ayr United	2018–19	Scottish Championship	33	1	2	0	1	0	3 (Note: One appearance in Scottish Challenge Cup, two appearances in Scottish Premiership play-offs)	0	39	0
Dundee United	2019–20	Scottish Championship	28	0	2	0	3	0	1	0	34	0
Dundee United	2020–21	Scottish Premiership	30	1	3	0	2	0	—		35	1
Dundee United	2021–22	Scottish Premiership	20	2	2	0	3	0	—		25	2
Dundee United	2022–23	Scottish Premiership	28	1	2	0	2	0	2 (Note: Appearances in UEFA Europa Conference League)	0	34	1
Dundee United	Total		106	4	9	0	10	0	3	0	128	4
Cheltenham Town	2023–24	EFL League One	13	0	0	0	1	0	1 (Note: Appearances in EFL Trophy)	0	15	0
Grimsby Town (loan)	2023–24	EFL League Two	11	1	—		—		—		11	1
Bohemians	2024	LOI Premier Division	9	0	3	0	—		—		12	0
Bohemians	2025	LOI Premier Division	14	0	2	0	—		1 (Note: Appearances in Leinster Senior Cup)	1	17	1
Bohemians	Total		23	0	5	0	—		1	1	29	1
St Johnstone	2025–26	Scottish Championship	3	0	0	0	—		0	0	3	0
Career total			274	9	18	0	15	0	15	1	322	10

== Honours ==
St Mirren

- Scottish Championship: 2017–18

Dundee United

- Scottish Championship: 2019–20

St Johnstone

- Scottish Championship: 2025–26
