= Franciszek Franczak =

Polish association football player

Personal information
- Full name: Franciszek Franczak
- Date of birth: 16 August 2007 (age 19)
- Place of birth: Limanowa, Poland
- Height: 1.76 m (5 ft 9 in)
- Position: Midfielder

Team information
- Current team: Odra Opole
- Number: 5

Youth career
- St Johnstone

Senior career*
Years	Team	Apps	(Gls)
2023–2026	St Johnstone	20	(0)
2026–	Odra Opole	0	(0)

International career^{‡}
2024	Poland U18	4	(0)
- * Club domestic league appearances and goals as of 13:42, 28 December 2025 (UTC) ‡ National team caps and goals as of 16:40, 18 November 2024 (UTC)

Franciszek Franczak (born 16 August 2007) is a Polish professional footballer who plays as a right midfielder for I liga club Odra Opole.

== Club career ==
A product of the St Johnstone academy, Franczak began to train with the first team squad during the club's preseason in the summer of 2023. He featured in first-team preseason friendly matches that summer, aged 15 years-old. He signed his first professional contract with the club in August 2023. He made his Scottish Premiership debut on 23 September 2023, as a second-half substitute against Hibernian, having turned 16 years old the previous month.

On 18 July 2026, after leaving St Johnstone at the end of his contract, Franczak signed with Polish second-tier club Odra Opole until mid-2028.

== International career ==
In August 2024, Franczak received his first Poland U18s call-up for a friendly tournament held in Croatia the following month. He made his debut in a 2–1 win over the hosts on 4 September.

== Personal life ==
Franczak was born in Limanowa but lived in Laskowa, Poland prior to moving to Perth, Scotland, with his family as a child. He has two brothers and one sister.

His older brother, Filip, plays for Strathspey Thistle.

== Career statistics ==
As of match played 20 December 2025

Appearances and goals by club, season and competition
Club	Season	League			National cup (Note: Includes Scottish Cup)		League cup (Note: Includes Scottish League Cup)		Europe		Other		Total	
Club	Season	Division	Apps	Goals	Apps	Goals	Apps	Goals	Apps	Goals	Apps	Goals	Apps	Goals
St Johnstone	2023–24	Scottish Premiership	8	0	1	0	0	0	—		—		9	0
St Johnstone	2024–25	Scottish Premiership	8	0	0	0	3	0	—		—		11	0
St Johnstone	2025–26	Scottish Championship	4	0	1	0	2	0	—		—		7	0
St Johnstone	Total		20	0	2	0	5	0	0	0	0	0	27	0
Odra Opole	2026–27	I liga	0	0	0	0	—		—		—		0	0
Career total			20	0	2	0	5	0	0	0	0	0	27	0

== Honours ==
St Johnstone

- Scottish Championship: 2025–26
