= Josh Rae =

Scottish footballer (born 2000)

Personal information
- Full name: Joshua Rae
- Date of birth: 17 October 2000 (age 26)
- Place of birth: Croy, Scotland
- Height: 6 ft 3 in (1.91 m)
- Position: Goalkeeper

Team information
- Current team: Raith Rovers
- Number: 1

Youth career
- Hamilton Academical
- Celtic
- Leeds United

Senior career*
Years	Team	Apps	(Gls)
2019–2020	Edinburgh City	2	(0)
2020	Cowdenbeath	10	(0)
2020–2021	Peterhead	17	(0)
2021	→ Queen of the South (loan)	0	(0)
2021–2022	Queen of the South	20	(0)
2022–2024	Airdrieonians	42	(0)
2024–2025	St Johnstone	14	(0)
2025	→ Raith Rovers (loan)	14	(0)
2025–	Raith Rovers	36	(0)
- * Club domestic league appearances and goals as of 4 May 2026

Josh Rae (born 17 October 2000) is a Scottish professional footballer who plays as a goalkeeper for Scottish Championship side Raith Rovers.

== Career ==
Rae attended Graeme High School and came through the youth systems of Hamilton Academical, Celtic and Leeds United before beginning his senior career with Edinburgh City. He has also played for Cowdenbeath, Peterhead, Queen of the South and Airdrieonians.

He joined St Johnstone of the Scottish Premiership in the summer of 2024, as competition for Ross Sinclair following the departure of Dimitar Mitov.

Josh Rae signed a loan deal with Raith Rovers in February 2025 however the deal turned to a permanent transfer with Rae signing for Raith Rovers on a permanent basis in May 2025.

Rae is currently on a two-year deal with Raith Rovers which expires in May 2027.

== Honours ==
Raith Rovers

- Scottish Challenge Cup: 2025–26
