= Morgan Boyes =

Welsh footballer (born 2001)

Personal information
- Full name: Morgan Marc Boyes
- Date of birth: 22 April 2001 (age 25)
- Place of birth: St Asaph, Wales
- Position: Defender

Team information
- Current team: St Johnstone
- Number: 4

Youth career
- Liverpool

Senior career*
Years	Team	Apps	(Gls)
2019–2022	Liverpool	0	(0)
2020–2021	→ Fleetwood Town (loan)	2	(0)
2022–2024	Livingston	32	(1)
2023–2024	→ Inverness Caledonian Thistle (loan)	25	(3)
2024–2025	Greenock Morton	31	(2)
2025–	St Johnstone	31	(1)

International career^{‡}
2018–2019	Wales U19	7	(0)
2020–2022	Wales U21	11	(0)
- * Club domestic league appearances and goals as of 4 May 2026 ‡ National team caps and goals as of 20 February 2024

Morgan Marc Boyes (born 22 April 2001) is a Welsh professional footballer who plays as a defender for Scottish Premiership club St Johnstone. Mainly a centre-back, he can also play as a left-back. He is a former Wales under-21 international.

== Early life ==
Boyes was born in the Welsh city of St Asaph and moved to Chester in England at the age of five.

== Club career ==
=== Liverpool ===
Boyes made his professional debut for Liverpool on 17 December 2019, starting in the away match against Aston Villa in the quarter-finals of the EFL Cup, which finished as a 5–0 loss. He scored an own goal in the match, after blocking a ball from Ahmed Elmohamady, to find it looped over the goalkeeper's head into the corner of the net. Boyes made another appearance for Liverpool in the 2019–20 season, as he appeared in stoppage time against Shrewsbury Town in the fourth round replay of the FA Cup.

On 12 August 2020, Boyes joined League One side Fleetwood Town on a season-long loan. On 23 September, he made his debut for the Cod Army. Starting at left centre-back in a EFL Cup Third round tie against Everton. He played the full match in a 2–5 defeat. He made kept his place in the squad for the next game. A 0–1 defeat against AFC Wimbledon in the League One. However, he would only make two more appearances before being recalled by Liverpool on 2 January 2021.

=== Livingston ===
On 4 January 2022, Boyes joined Scottish Premiership side Livingston on an 18-month contract, with an option of a further year.

==== Inverness ====
On 1 September 2023 Boyes joined Scottish Championship club Inverness on a loan deal till the end of the 2023/24 season.

=== Greenock Morton ===
Following his departure from Livi, Boyes signed for Greenock Morton.

=== St Johnstone ===
On 29 May 2025, Boyes signed for Scottish Championship club St Johnstone on a two-year deal.

== International career ==
Boyes has Wales caps at both under-19 and under-21 levels. In March 2021, he was called up to the Wales national under-21 football team, playing all 90 minutes in Wales's 2–1 defeat by Ireland at Colliers Park, Wrexham on 26 March 2021. Manager Paul Bodin then selected a largely unchanged squad, including Boyes, for the side's Euro 2023 qualifying game against Moldova on 4 June 2021.

== Style of play ==
Boyes is a centre-back but has also been deployed as a left back so far during his career. He has described himself as a "calm defender who likes to play and build up from the back.". Joey Barton, who managed Boyes during his loan spell at Fleetwood, described him as "a young player with plenty of potential".

== Career statistics ==
As of match played 21 January 2023

Appearances and goals by club, season and competition
Club	Season	League			National cup (Note: Includes FA Cup, Scottish Cup)		League cup (Note: Includes EFL Cup)		Europe		Other		Total	
Club	Season	Division	Apps	Goals	Apps	Goals	Apps	Goals	Apps	Goals	Apps	Goals	Apps	Goals
Liverpool U21	2019–20	—			—		—		—		2 (Note: Appearances in EFL Trophy)	0	2	0
Liverpool	2019–20	Premier League	0	0	1	0	1	0	—		—		2	0
Fleetwood Town (loan)	2020–21	League One	2	0	0	0	1	0	—		1	0	4	0
Livingston	2021–22	Scottish Premiership	9	0	0	0	0	0	—		0	0	9	0
Livingston	2022–23	Scottish Premiership	9	1	1	0	0	0	—		0	0	10	1
Livingston	Total		18	1	1	0	0	0	0	0	0	0	19	1
Total			20	1	2	0	2	0	0	0	3	0	27	1

== Honours ==
Liverpool

- FA Youth Cup: 2018–19

St Johnstone

- Scottish Championship: 2025–26
