= Kerr Smith (footballer) =

Scottish footballer (born 2004)

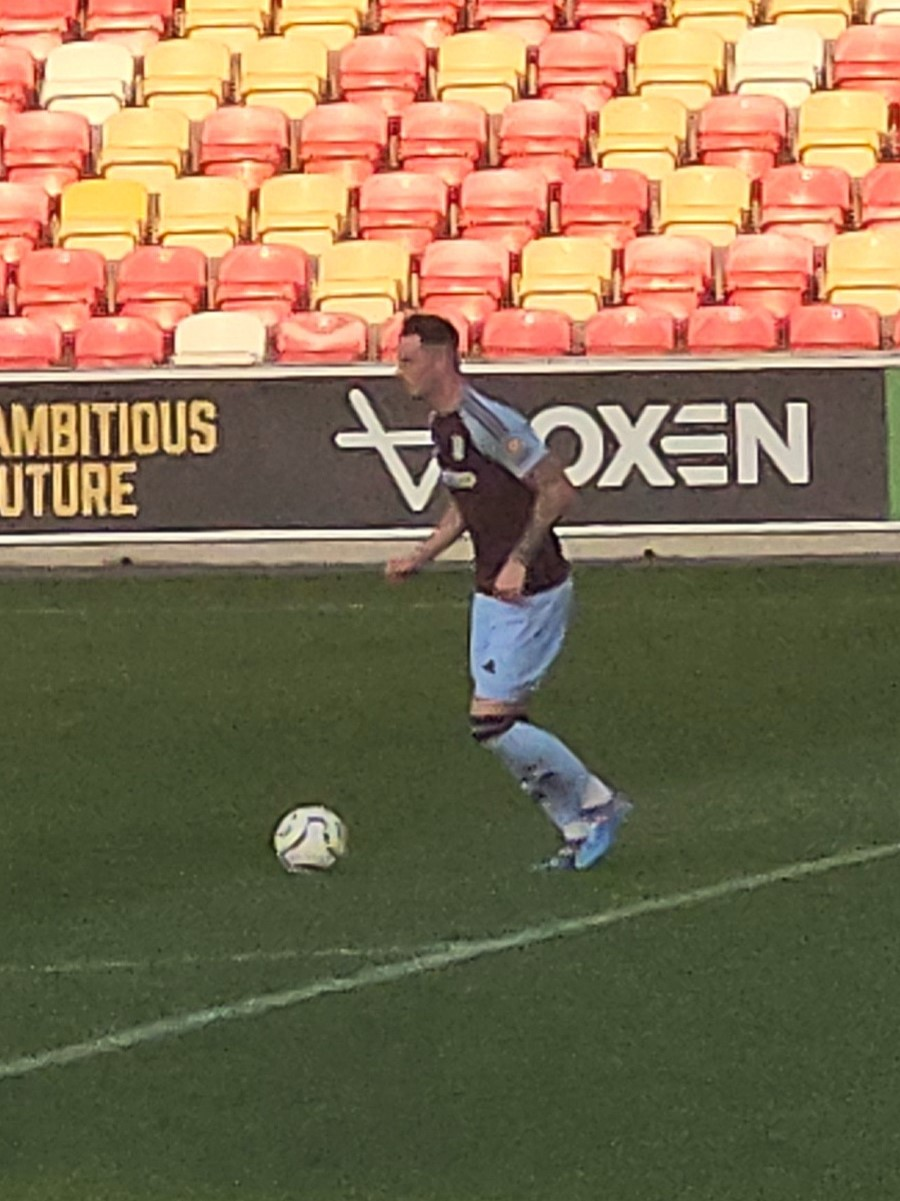
- Kerr Smith playing for Aston Villa U21s

Personal information
- Full name: Kerr David Smith
- Date of birth: 12 December 2004 (age 21)
- Place of birth: Dundee, Scotland
- Height: 1.88 m (6 ft 2 in)
- Position: Centre-back

Team information
- Current team: Inverness Caledonian Thistle
- Number: 15

Youth career
- Brechin City
- 2011–2021: Dundee United

Senior career*
Years	Team	Apps	(Gls)
2021–2022	Dundee United	10	(0)
2022–2026	Aston Villa	0	(0)
2024	→ St Johnstone (loan)	3	(0)
2025–2026	→ Barrow (loan)	2	(0)
2026–	Inverness Caledonian Thistle	2	(0)

International career^{‡}
2021–2022	Scotland U19	9	(0)
- * Club domestic league appearances and goals as of 10:03, 15 September 2026 (UTC) ‡ National team caps and goals as of 19:52, 25 September 2022 (UTC)

Kerr David Smith (born 12 December 2004) is a Scottish professional footballer who plays as a centre-back for Scottish Championship club Inverness Caledonian Thistle.

He is a product of the Dundee United academy, and made his Scottish Premiership debut there in 2021 aged 16, before joining Aston Villa in January 2022.

== Early life ==
Smith was born in Dundee on 12 December 2004 and grew up in Montrose, Angus. Smith attended Lochside Primary School in Montrose, Angus and St John's RC High School in Dundee. Smith played for the Brechin City Boys Club as a child before starting an association with the Dundee United academy at seven years old.

== Club career ==
=== Dundee United ===
Smith was developed through Dundee United's academy. At the age of 15, he appeared for a youthful Dundee United team in a friendly match against Premier League club Sheffield United in August 2020, which was abandoned after 45 minutes. In the next few weeks, he had trials with Premier League clubs Aston Villa, Everton F.C. and Manchester United. Despite interest from those clubs and others in England, Smith decided to sign his first professional contract with Dundee United upon reaching his 16th birthday in December 2020, under contract until 2023. He was immediately allocated a first team squad number of 43 and was an unused substitute in United's Scottish Premiership match against Rangers the following day.

He made his competitive senior debut for Dundee United as a late substitute in their 4–1 Premiership defeat against Rangers at Ibrox Stadium on 21 February 2021. He then made his first starting appearance in a 3–0 defeat against Kilmarnock at Rugby Park on 21 April 2021.

=== Aston Villa ===
On 14 January 2022, English Premier League club Aston Villa announced Smith as a new signing for their Academy. The transfer fee was undisclosed, but was reported to be worth up to £2 million.

==== St Johnstone loan ====
On 2 January 2024, Smith signed a professional contract with Aston Villa. The same day he joined Scottish Premiership club St Johnstone on loan until the end of the season. Smith made his debut as a late substitute in a 1–0 victory over Ross County on 3 February. Smith returned to Aston Villa in March 2024, after suffering a season ending injury.

==== Barrow loan ====
On 15 August 2025, Smith signed for EFL League Two club Barrow on a season-long loan.

On 10 June 2026, the Premier League released list showed that Smith's Aston Villa contract was set to expire on 30 June.

=== Inverness Caledonian Thistle ===
On 17 July 2026, Smith signed for Scottish Championship club Inverness Caledonian Thistle on a one-year contract. He made his debut on 21 August 2026, as a late substitute in a 1–1 league draw against Partick Thistle.

== International career ==
Smith made his debut for the Scotland U19 team in a 3–0 victory over Gibraltar in a 2022 UEFA European Under-19 Championship qualification match on 13 November 2021.

He was selected for the Scotland under-21 squad in Oct 2023 but was not capped.

== Career statistics ==
As of match played 29 August 2026

Appearances and goals by club, season and competition
Club	Season	League			National Cup		League Cup		Other		Total	
Club	Season	Division	Apps	Goals	Apps	Goals	Apps	Goals	Apps	Goals	Apps	Goals
Dundee United	2020–21	Scottish Premiership	5	0	0	0	0	0	0	0	5	0
Dundee United	2021–22	Scottish Premiership	5	0	0	0	2	0	0	0	7	0
Dundee United	Total		10	0	0	0	2	0	0	0	12	0
Aston Villa	2021–22	Premier League	0	0	0	0	0	0	0	0	0	0
Aston Villa	2022–23	Premier League	0	0	0	0	0	0	2 (Note: Appearances for Aston Villa U21 in the EFL Trophy)	0	2	0
Aston Villa	2023–24	Premier League	0	0	0	0	0	0	3	0	3	0
Aston Villa	2024–25	Premier League	0	0	0	0	0	0	3	0	3	0
Aston Villa	2025–26	Premier League	0	0	0	0	0	0	0	0	0	0
Aston Villa	Total		0	0	0	0	0	0	8	0	8	0
St Johnstone (loan)	2023–24	Scottish Premiership	3	0	0	0	0	0	0	0	3	0
Barrow (loan)	2025–26	EFL League Two	2	0	0	0	–		0	0	2	0
Inverness Caledonian Thistle	2026–27	Scottish Championship	2	0	0	0	0	0	0	0	2	0
Career total			17	0	0	0	2	0	7	0	26	0
