= 2023–24 St Johnstone F.C. season =

St Johnstone
2023–24 season
- Chief executive: Stan Harris
- Manager: Steven MacLean (until 29 October); Alec Cleland (Interim); Craig Levein (from 5 November)
- Stadium: McDiarmid Park
- Scottish Premiership: Tenth place
- Scottish Cup: Fourth round
- League Cup: Group stage
- Top goalscorer: League: Nicky Clark (6); All: Nicky Clark (6)
- Highest home attendance: 6,967, vs. Rangers, Premiership, 16 September 2023
- Lowest home attendance: 2,052, vs. Stirling Albion, League Cup, 29 July 2023
- Average home league attendance: 4,663
Home colours	Away colours	Third colours

The 2023–24 season was St Johnstone's eleventh season in the Scottish Premiership and their fifteenth consecutively (following four in the former Scottish Premier League) in the top flight of Scottish football. Saints also competed in the League Cup and the Scottish Cup.

== Competitions ==
Win Draw Loss Postponed

=== Pre-season and friendlies ===
4 July 2023	Dunfermline Athletic	1–1	St Johnstone	Dunfermline
19:45 BST	Wighton 13'	Report	Carey 26'	Stadium: East End Park; Attendance: 1,617; Referee: Kevin Clancy

11 July 2023	East Fife	0–3	St Johnstone	Methil
19:45 BST		Report	Crawford 63'; Mylchreest 65'; Booth 85'	Stadium: Bayview Stadium; Referee: Scott Lambie

=== Scottish Premiership ===
5 August 2023 1	St Johnstone	0–2	Heart of Midlothian	Perth
15:00		Report	Oda 75'; Shankland 90+6'	Stadium: McDiarmid Park; Attendance: 6,818; Referee: Steven McLean

12 August 2023 2	Ross County	2–0	St Johnstone	Dingwall
15:00	Turner 40'; Randall 51'	Report		Stadium: Victoria Park; Attendance: 4,157; Referee: William Collum

26 August 2023 3	Celtic	0–0	St Johnstone	Glasgow
15:00		Report		Stadium: Celtic Park; Attendance: 58,600; Referee: Matthew MacDermid

2 September 2023 4	St Johnstone	2–2	Dundee	Perth
15:00	Kucheriavyi 86', 90+6'	Report	Tiffoney 35'; Lamie 58'	Stadium: McDiarmid Park; Attendance: 5,935; Referee: William Collum

16 September 2023 5	St Johnstone	0–2	Rangers	Perth
15:00		Report	Danilo 16'; Matondo 79'	Stadium: McDiarmid Park; Attendance: 6,967; Referee: Nick Walsh

23 September 2023 6	Hibernian	2–0	St Johnstone	Edinburgh
15:00	Miller 35'; Vente 69'	Report		Stadium: Easter Road; Attendance: 16,850; Referee: Kevin Clancy

30 September 2023 7	St Johnstone	1–1	Livingston	Perth
15:00	Costelloe 36'; Gordon (red card) 83'	Report	Kelly 57' (pen.)	Stadium: McDiarmid Park; Attendance: 2,691; Referee: Graham Grainger

8 October 2023 8	Aberdeen	0–0	St Johnstone	Aberdeen
15:00		Report		Stadium: Pittodrie Stadium; Attendance: 16,816; Referee: David Munro

28 October 2023 10	St Mirren	4–0	St Johnstone	Paisley
15:00	Baccus 36'; Mandron 48', 70'; Kiltie 90'	Report		Stadium: St Mirren Park; Attendance: 5,552; Referee: David Dickinson

1 November 2023 11	St Johnstone	2–1	Kilmarnock	Perth
19:45	Clark 1', 7'; Costelloe (red card) 75'	Report	Vassell 47'	Stadium: McDiarmid Park; Attendance: 2,840; Referee: Calum Scott

7 November 2023 9	St Johnstone	2–2	Motherwell	Perth
19:45	Clark 17'; Considine 27'	Report	Blaney 68'; Biereth 74'	Stadium: McDiarmid Park; Attendance: 3,513; Referee: Euan Anderson
Note: Match postponed due to Storm Babet

11 November 2023 12	St Johnstone	1–0	Ross County	Perth
15:00	Carey 71'	Report		Stadium: McDiarmid Park; Attendance: 3,018; Referee: Nick Walsh

25 November 2023 13	Heart of Midlothian	1–0	St Johnstone	Edinburgh
15:00	Shankland 61'	Report		Stadium: Tynecastle Park; Attendance: 18,678; Referee: John Beaton

3 December 2023 14	St Johnstone	1–3	Celtic	Perth
12:00	Jaiyesimi 40'	Report	McGregor 61'; O'Riley 79'; Forrest 90+3'	Stadium: McDiarmid Park; Attendance: 6,777; Referee: Don Robertson

6 December 2023 15	St Johnstone	1–0	St Mirren	Perth
19:45	Kane 90+6'	Report		Stadium: McDiarmid Park; Attendance: 2,449; Referee: Kevin Clancy

9 December 2023 16	Motherwell	1–1	St Johnstone	Motherwell
15:00	Biereth 90+2'	Report	Mugabi 53' (o.g.)	Stadium: Fir Park; Attendance: 3,647; Referee: Euan Anderson

16 December 2023 17	St Johnstone	1–0	Hibernian	Perth
15:00	Carey 57'	Report		Stadium: McDiarmid Park; Attendance: 4,276; Referee: Graham Grainger

20 December 2023 18	Rangers	2–0	St Johnstone	Glasgow
19:45	Dessers 28'; Tavernier 84' (pen.)		Jaiyesimi (red card) 33'	Stadium: Ibrox Stadium; Attendance: 46,931; Referee: Alan Muir

23 December 2023 19	Kilmarnock	2–1	St Johnstone	Kilmarnock
15:00	Watson 6'; Watkins 17'	Report	Clark 61'	Stadium: Rugby Park; Attendance: 5,074; Referee: John Beaton

27 December 2023 20	Livingston	0–0	St Johnstone	Livingston
19:45		Report		Stadium: Almondvale Stadium; Attendance: 1,602; Referee: Kevin Clancy

24 January 2024 22	St Johnstone	1–1	Aberdeen	Perth
19:45	Keltjens 78'	Report	Miovski 62' (pen.)	Stadium: McDiarmid Park; Attendance: 3,472; Referee: John Beaton

27 January 2024 23	St Johnstone	1–1	Motherwell	Perth
15:00	McGowan 3'	Report	Bair 29'	Stadium: McDiarmid Park; Attendance: 3,412; Referee: Colin Steven

3 February 2024 24	Ross County	0–1	St Johnstone	Dingwall
15:00		Report	Kimpioka 34'	Stadium: Victoria Park; Attendance: 2,913; Referee: Craig Napier

7 February 2024 25	St Johnstone	0–1	Heart of Midlothian	Perth
15:00		Report	Shankland 55'	Stadium: McDiarmid Park; Attendance: 4,518; Referee: Iain Snedden

11 February 2024 21	Dundee	2–1	St Johnstone	Dundee
14:00	McCowan 75' (pen.); McGhee 89'	Report	Smith 9'	Stadium: Dens Park; Attendance: 7,102; Referee: David Munro
Note: Match postponed due to a waterlogged pitch.

18 February 2024 26	St Johnstone	0–3	Rangers	Perth
12:00		Report	Diomande 37'; Tavernier 79' (pen.), 87' (pen.)	Stadium: McDiarmid Park; Attendance: 6,986; Referee: Matthew MacDermid

24 February 2024 27	St Mirren	2–0	St Johnstone	Paisley
15:00	Mitov 36' (o.g.); Mandron 64'	Report		Stadium: St Mirren Park; Attendance: 5,991; Referee: Grant Irvine

28 February 2024 28	Aberdeen	0–2	St Johnstone	Aberdeen
19:45		Report	Clark 44' (pen.); Kimpioka 77'	Stadium: Pittodrie Stadium; Attendance: 14,226; Referee: Don Robertson

2 March 2024 29	St Johnstone	1–1	Livingston	Perth
12:00	Clark 87'	Report	Shinnie 37'	Stadium: McDiarmid Park; Attendance: 3,287; Referee: Chris Graham

16 March 2024 30	Celtic	3–1	St Johnstone	Glasgow
15:00	Furuhashi 40'; Kühn 46'; Forrest 68'		Smith 81'	Stadium: Celtic Park; Referee: Euan Anderson

30 March 2024 31	St Johnstone	1–2	Dundee	Perth
15:00	Sidibeh 60'	Report	Cameron 6'; Bakayoko 80'	Stadium: McDiarmid Park; Attendance: 6,691; Referee: Iain Snedden

6 April 2024 32	Hibernian	1–2	St Johnstone	Edinburgh
15:00	Cadden 56'	Report	Sidibeh 49'; Gallacher 81'	Stadium: Easter Road; Attendance: 16,735; Referee: Grant Irvine

13 April 2024 33	St Johnstone	0–2	Kilmarnock	Perth
15:00		Report	Wright 23'; Watkins 81'	Stadium: McDiarmid Park; Attendance: 4,087; Referee: Calum Scott

27 April 2024 34	St Johnstone	1–3	Hibernian	Perth
15:00	Kimpioka 89'	Report	Marcondes 6'; Hanlon 44'; Vente 76'	Stadium: McDiarmid Park; Attendance: 4,450; Referee: David Munro

4 May 2024 35	Aberdeen	1–0	St Johnstone	Aberdeen
15:00	Miovski 68' (pen.)	Report		Stadium: Pittodrie Stadium; Attendance: 15,537; Referee: Chris Graham

11 May 2024 36	Livingston	2–1	St Johnstone	Livingston
15:00	Montaño 72'; Shinnie 90+5'	Report	Sidibeh 8'	Stadium: Almondvale Stadium; Referee: John Beaton

15 May 2024 37	St Johnstone	1–1	Ross County	Perth
19:45	Sidibeh 90'	Report	Dhanda 28'	Stadium: McDiarmid Park; Attendance: 4,202; Referee: Nick Walsh

19 May 2024 38	Motherwell	1–2	St Johnstone	Motherwell
15:00	Ebiye 90+4'		Clark 18'; Sidibeh 45+1'	Stadium: Fir Park; Attendance: 5,571

=== Scottish League Cup ===
15 July 2023 1	Stenhousemuir	1–0	St Johnstone	Stenhousemuir
15:00	O'Reilly 49'	Report		Stadium: Ochilview Park; Attendance: 1,376; Referee: Calum Scott

22 July 2023 2	Alloa Athletic	0–4	St Johnstone	Alloa
15:00		Report	Ballantyne 1'; McGowan 20'; May 63'; McCrystal 89'	Stadium: Recreation Park; Attendance: 992; Referee: Grant Irvine

25 July 2023 3	St Johnstone	1–2	Ayr United	Perth
19:45	Kucheriavyi 43'	Report	Stanger 29'; Dempsey 71'	Stadium: McDiarmid Park; Attendance: 2,669; Referee: Nick Walsh

29 July 2023 4	St Johnstone	0–4	Stirling Albion	Perth
15:00		Report	Spence 11'; Milne 36'; McLean 48', 54'	Stadium: McDiarmid Park; Attendance: 2,052; Referee: Euan Anderson

=== Scottish Cup ===
20 January 2024 Fourth Round	Airdrieonians	1–0	St Johnstone	Airdrie
15:00	Todorov 54'	Report		Stadium: Excelsior Stadium; Referee: Kevin Clancy

== Squad statistics ==
=== Appearances and goals ===
As of 15 May 2024

No.	Pos	Nat	Player	Total		Premiership		Scottish Cup		League Cup	
No.	Pos	Nat	Player	Apps	Goals	Apps	Goals	Apps	Goals	Apps	Goals
1	GK	(Bulgaria) BUL	Dimitar Mitov	40	0	37	0	1	0	2	0
3	DF	(Scotland) SCO	Tony Gallacher	21	1	12+4	1	1	0	4	0
4	DF	(Scotland) SCO	Andrew Considine	32	1	24+3	1	1	0	3+1	0
5	DF	(Australia) AUS	Ryan McGowan	32	2	26+1	1	1	0	3+1	1
6	DF	(Scotland) SCO	Liam Gordon	34	0	28+1	0	1	0	4	0
7	FW	(Scotland) SCO	Stevie May	31	1	8+18	0	0+1	0	4	1
8	MF	(Scotland) SCO	Cammy MacPherson	10	0	3+7	0	0	0	0	0
10	FW	(Scotland) SCO	Nicky Clark	21	6	15+5	6	1	0	0	0
11	MF	(Republic of Ireland) IRL	Graham Carey	37	2	27+7	2	1	0	2	0
13	MF	(England) ENG	Diallang Jaiyesimi	15	1	9+5	1	0+1	0	0	0
14	MF	(England) ENG	Drey Wright	11	0	7+1	0	0	0	3	0
15	MF	(Ukraine) UKR	Max Kucheriavyi	32	3	17+10	2	1	0	4	1
16	FW	(The Gambia) GAM	Adama Sidibeh	13	5	9+4	5	0	0	0	0
17	DF	(England) ENG	Oludare Olufunwa	10	0	7+3	0	0	0	0	0
19	DF	(Scotland) SCO	Luke Robinson	32	0	31	0	0+1	0	0	0
20	GK	(Scotland) SCO	Ross Sinclair	2	0	0	0	0	0	2	0
21	MF	(Scotland) SCO	Ali Crawford	1	0	0	0	0	0	0+1	0
22	MF	(Wales) WAL	Matthew Smith	33	0	29+3	0	1	0	0	0
23	MF	(Austria) AUT	Sven Sprangler	19	0	11+7	0	0+1	0	0	0
24	DF	(Scotland) SCO	Callum Booth	1	0	0	0	0	0	0+1	0
27	MF	(England) ENG	Jay Turner-Cooke	5	0	2+3	0	0	0	0	0
29	FW	(Sweden) SWE	Benjamin Mbunga Kimpioka	15	3	6+8	3	1	0	0	0
31	GK	(Wales) WAL	Dave Richards	0	0	0	0	0	0	0	0
33	DF	(Israel) ISR	David Keltjens	12	1	12	1	0	0	0	0
34	MF	(Trinidad and Tobago) TTO	Daniel Phillips	34	0	31+1	0	0	0	1+1	0
35	DF	(Scotland) SCO	Kerr Smith	2	0	1+1	0	0	0	0	0
46	MF	(Poland) POL	Fran Franczak	9	0	6+2	0	1	0	0	0
50	MF	(Scotland) SCO	Connor Smith	10	1	4+6	1	0	0	0	0
Departures
2	DF	(Malta) MLT	James Brown	12	0	8+3	0	0	0	1	0
9	FW	(Scotland) SCO	Chris Kane	14	1	7+7	1	0	0	0	0
16	FW	(Wales) WAL	Luke Jephcott	11	0	3+5	0	0	0	3	0
18	DF	(Northern Ireland) NIR	Sam McClelland	7	0	5+2	0	0	0	0	0
25	MF	(Scotland) SCO	Cammy Ballantyne	6	1	2	0	0	0	4	1
27	MF	(Scotland) SCO	Alex Ferguson	2	0	0	0	0	0	2	0
30	GK	(Scotland) SCO	Jack Willis	0	0	0	0	0	0	0	0
31	GK	(Scotland) SCO	Craig Hepburn	0	0	0	0	0	0	0	0
32	DF	(Scotland) SCO	Liam Parker	1	0	0	0	0	0	1	0
33	FW	(Scotland) SCO	Taylor Steven	5	0	0+2	0	0	0	0+3	0
38	MF	(Scotland) SCO	Scott Bright	1	0	0	0	0	0	0+1	0
42	MF	(Scotland) SCO	Ben McCrystal	2	1	0	0	0	0	0+2	1
44	FW	(Republic of Ireland) IRL	Dara Costelloe	11	1	8+3	1	0	0	0	0
45	FW	(Scotland) SCO	Jackson Mylchreest	4	0	0	0	0	0	0+4	0

== Team statistics ==
=== League table ===
Pos	Team	Pld	W	D	L	GF	GA	GD	Pts	Qualification or relegation (Note: Teams play each other three times (33 matches), before the league is split into two groups (the top six and the bottom six).)
8	Hibernian	38	11	13	14	52	59	−7	46	
9	Motherwell	38	10	13	15	56	59	−3	43	
10	St Johnstone	38	8	11	19	29	54	−25	35	
11	Ross County (O)	38	8	11	19	38	67	−29	35	Qualification for the Premiership play-off final
12	Livingston (R)	38	5	10	23	29	70	−41	25	Relegation to Championship

Rules for classification: 1) Points; 2) Goal difference; 3) Goals scored; 4) Head-to-Head points; 5) Head-to-Head goal difference; 6) Play-off (only if deciding champion, UEFA competitions qualification, second stage group allocation or relegation).
(O) Play-off winners; (R) Relegated

=== League Cup table ===
Pos	Team	Pld	W	PW	PL	L	GF	GA	GD	Pts	Qualification	AYR	STI	STJ	STE	ALL
1	Ayr United	4	3	1	0	0	10	2	+8	11	Qualification for the second round	—	—	—	1–0	6–0
2	Stirling Albion	4	3	0	1	0	9	3	+6	10	Qualification for the second round	1–1p	—	—	2–1	—
3	St Johnstone	4	1	0	0	3	5	7	−2	3		1–2	0–4	—	—	—
4	Stenhousemuir	4	1	0	0	3	3	6	−3	3		—	—	1–0	—	1–3
5	Alloa Athletic	4	1	0	0	3	4	13	−9	3		—	1–2	0–4	—	—

Rules for classification: 1) goal difference, 2) goals scored, 3) away goals scored, 4) matches won, 5) away matches won, 6) drawing of lots.

== Transfers ==
=== In ===
Date	Player	Transferred from	Fee	Source
14 July 2023	(Bulgaria) Dimitar Mitov	(England) Cambridge United	Free	
21 July 2023	(Wales) Luke Jephcott	(England) Plymouth Argyle	Free	
3 August 2023	(Northern Ireland) Sam McClelland	(England) Chelsea	Free	
4 August 2023	(England) Oludare Olufunwa	(England) Liverpool	Free	
5 August 2023	(Wales) Matthew Smith	(England) MK Dons	Free	
1 September 2023	(Austria) Sven Sprangler	(Austria) SK Vorwärts Steyr	Free	
2 January 2024	(Sweden) Benjamin Mbunga Kimpioka	(Sweden) AIK	Free	
9 January 2024	(Israel) David Keltjens	(Israel) Hapoel Tel Aviv	Free	
26 January 2024	(Scotland) Connor Smith	(Scotland) Heart of Midlothian	Free	
1 February 2024	(The Gambia) Adama Sidibeh	(England) Warrington Rylands	Undisclosed	

=== Out ===
Date	Player	Transferred to	Fee	Source
30 May 2023	(Scotland) Bobby Dailly	(England) Romford	Free	
30 May 2023	(Scotland) Murray Davidson	Retired		
30 May 2023	(Scotland) Charlie Gilmour	(Scotland) Inverness Caledonian Thistle	Free	
30 May 2023	(Sweden) Melker Hallberg	(Sweden) Kalmar FF	Free	
30 May 2023	(Scotland) Spencer Moreland	(Scotland) Brechin City	Free	
30 May 2023	(Scotland) Jamie Murphy	(Scotland) Ayr United	Free	
30 May 2023	(Scotland) Michael O'Halloran	(Scotland) Dunfermline Athletic	Free	
30 May 2023	(Scotland) William Sandford		Free	
30 May 2023	(Finland) Eetu Vertainen	(Italy) Triestina	Free	
30 May 2023	(Canada) David Wotherspoon	(Scotland) Inverness Caledonian Thistle	Free	
16 June 2023	(England) Elliot Parish		Free	
4 July 2023	(Canada) Theo Bair	(Scotland) Motherwell	Free	
25 January 2024	(Wales) Luke Jephcott	(Wales) Newport County	Free	

=== Loans in ===
Date	Player	Transferred from	Source
11 August 2023	(Wales) Dave Richards	(England) Crewe Alexandra	
15 August 2023	(Republic of Ireland) Dara Costelloe	(England) Burnley	
22 August 2023	(Scotland) Luke Robinson	(England) Wigan Athletic	
24 August 2023	(England) Jay Turner-Cooke	(England) Newcastle United	
1 September 2023	(England) Diallang Jaiyesimi	(England) Charlton Athletic	
1 September 2023	(Scotland) Kerr Smith	(England) Aston Villa	

=== Loans out ===
Date	Player	Transferred to	Source
27 June 2023	(Scotland) Craig Hepburn	(Scotland) Cowdenbeath	
11 August 2023	(Scotland) Jackson Mylchreest	(Scotland) Tranent	
11 August 2023	(Scotland) Bayley Klimionek	(Scotland) Berwick Rangers	
18 August 2023	(Scotland) Alex Ferguson	(Scotland) Queen of the South	
25 August 2023	(Scotland) Taylor Steven	(Scotland) Alloa Athletic	
15 September 2023	(Scotland) Ben McCrystal	(Scotland) Broomhill	
4 October 2023	(Scotland) Scott Bright	(Scotland) Berwick Rangers	
4 October 2023	(Scotland) Joe Ellison	(Scotland) Berwick Rangers	
6 October 2023	(Scotland) Liam Parker	(Scotland) Civil Service Strollers	
24 December 2023	(Scotland) Kyle Thomson	(Scotland) Brechin City	
6 January 2024	(Scotland) Callum Booth	(Scotland) The Spartans	
5 February 2024	(Northern Ireland) Sam McClelland	(Scotland) Dundee United	
6 February 2024	(Scotland) Cammy Ballantyne	(Scotland) Clyde	
9 February 2024	(Malta) James Brown	(Scotland) Raith Rovers	
13 February 2024	(Scotland) Chris Kane	(Scotland) Dunfermline Athletic	
28 February 2024	(Scotland) Jack Willis	(Scotland) Queen's Park	

== See also ==
- List of St Johnstone F.C. seasons
