= Ross Sinclair =

Ross Sinclair may refer to:

- Ross Sinclair (artist) (born 1966), Scottish visual artist, musician and writer
- Ross Sinclair (water polo) (born 1985), American water polo player and coach
- Ross Sinclair (footballer) (born 2001), Scottish footballer
