= Sam McClelland =

Northern Irish footballer

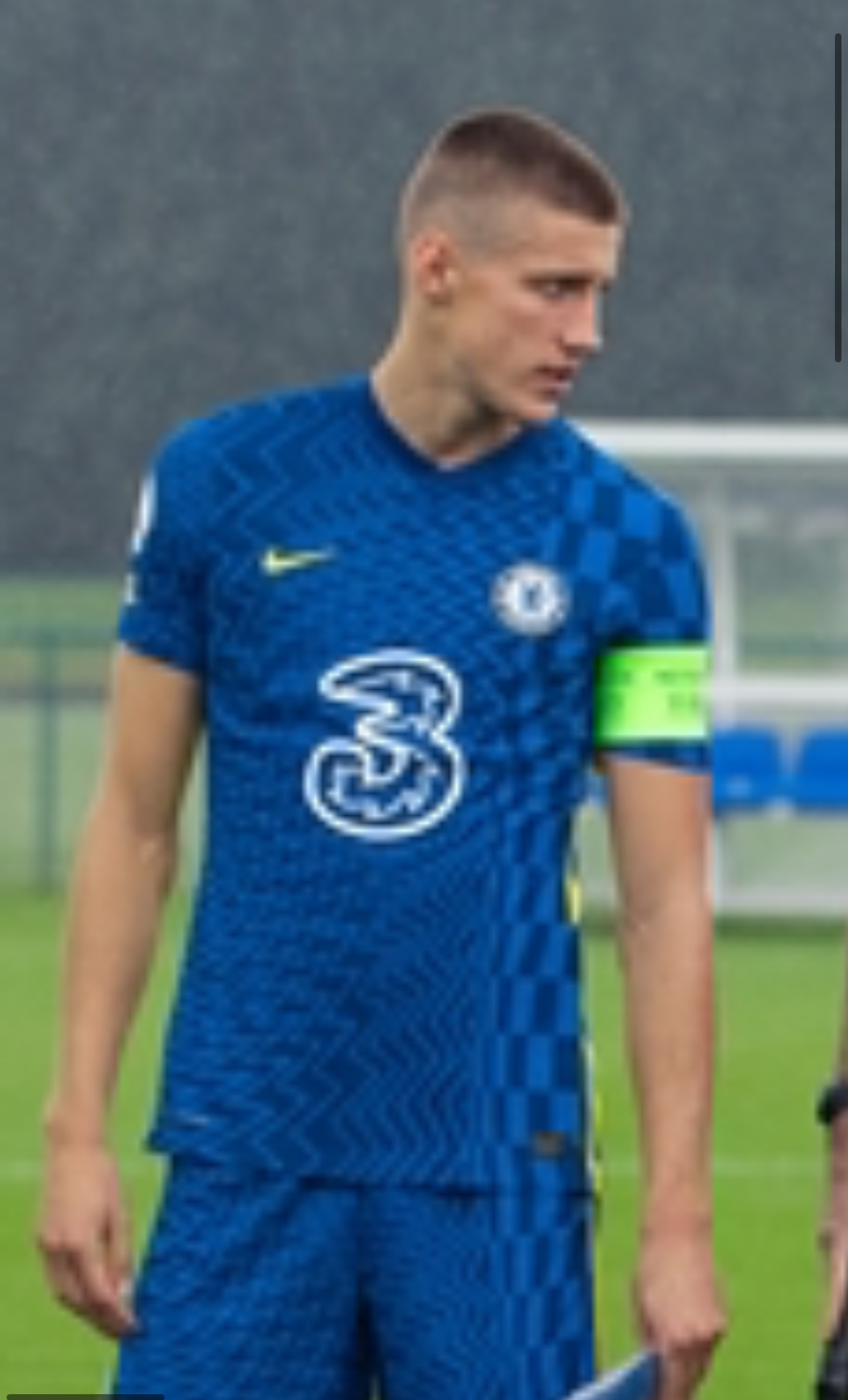

Personal information
- Full name: Sam Richard McClelland
- Date of birth: 4 January 2002 (age 24)
- Place of birth: Derry, Northern Ireland
- Position: Defender

Youth career
- 2010–2015: Limavady Youth
- 2015–2018: Coleraine
- 2018–2022: Chelsea

Senior career*
Years	Team	Apps	(Gls)
2022–2023	Chelsea	0	(0)
2022–2023	→ Barrow (loan)	27	(1)
2023–2025	St Johnstone	8	(0)
2024	→ Dundee United (loan)	6	(0)
2026–	Larne	0	(0)

International career^{‡}
2017–2019	Northern Ireland U17	11	(0)
2019	Northern Ireland U19	5	(0)
2021–	Northern Ireland U21	10	(0)
2021–	Northern Ireland	1	(0)
- * Club domestic league appearances and goals as of 11 June 2025 ‡ National team caps and goals as of 23 September 2022

Sam Richard McClelland (born 4 January 2002) is a Northern Irish professional football player who plays for Larne F.C. and the Northern Ireland national team. He has had loan spells with Barrow and Dundee United.

== Club career ==
=== Chelsea ===
McClelland began his youth career playing for Limavady Youths before moving to the Coleraine Academy. He made his Chelsea U18 debut against Arsenal in September 2018 and signed his first professional contract in July 2019.

On 23 June 2022, he signed on a year long loan for League Two side Barrow. McClelland made his debut on 30 July, starting in a 3–2 away win against Stockport County. He scored his first career goal in a 2–1 win over Walsall on 16 August 2022.

On 16 June 2023, Chelsea announced that McClelland would leave the club when his contract expired at the end of June.

=== St Johnstone ===
On 3 August 2023, McClelland signed for Scottish Premiership club St Johnstone. He moved on loan to Dundee United in February 2024.

== International career ==
McClelland made his international debut for Northern Ireland on 3 June 2021 against Ukraine in a friendly.

== Career statistics ==
=== Club ===
As of 19 January 2024

Appearances and goals by club, season and competition
Club	Season	League			FA Cup		League Cup		Europe		Other		Total	
Club	Season	Division	Apps	Goals	Apps	Goals	Apps	Goals	Apps	Goals	Apps	Goals	Apps	Goals
Chelsea U21	2021–22	—			—		—		—		1 (Note: Appearances in the EFL Trophy)	0	1	0
Chelsea	2022–23	Premier League	0	0	0	0	0	0	0	0	0	0	0	0
Barrow (loan)	2022–23	League Two	27	1	0	0	2	0	—		1	0	30	1
St Johnstone	2023–24	Scottish Premiership	7	0	0	0	0	0	—		0	0	7	0
Career total			34	1	0	0	2	0	0	0	2	0	38	1

=== International ===
As of match played 3 June 2021

Appearances and goals by national team and year
National team	Year	Apps	Goals
Northern Ireland	2021	1	0
Total		1	0

== Honours ==
Larne

- NIFL Charity Shield 2026
