= Josh McPake =

Scottish association football player

- McPake in 2026

Personal information
- Full name: Joshua McPake
- Date of birth: 31 August 2001 (age 25)
- Place of birth: Coatbridge, Lanarkshire, Scotland
- Position: Winger

Team information
- Current team: Heart of Midlothian
- Number: 15

Youth career
- Rangers

Senior career*
Years	Team	Apps	(Gls)
2019–2023	Rangers	0	(0)
2019–2020	→ Dundee (loan)	7	(0)
2020–2021	→ Greenock Morton (loan)	6	(0)
2021	→ Harrogate Town (loan)	22	(4)
2021–2022	→ Morecambe (loan)	7	(0)
2022	→ Tranmere Rovers (loan)	14	(1)
2022–2023	→ Queen's Park (loan)	27	(4)
2024	Stirling Albion	14	(4)
2024–2026	St Johnstone	46	(17)
2026–	Heart of Midlothian	11	(3)

International career^{‡}
2017–2018	Scotland U17	7	(1)
2015–2017	Scotland U18	2	(0)
2019–2020	Scotland U19	6	(1)
2026–	Scotland	1	(0)
- * Club domestic league appearances and goals as of 22 November 2026 ‡ National team caps and goals as of 6 October 2026

Joshua McPake (born 31 August 2001) is a Scottish professional footballer who plays as a winger for Scottish Premiership club Heart of Midlothian and the Scotland national team.

McPake started his career at Rangers and has had several loans spells with Dundee, Greenock Morton, Harrogate Town, Morecambe, Tranmere Rovers and Queen's Park respectively. After departing Rangers, he played for Stirling Albion on a short-term deal, before joining St Johnstone the following season.

== Club career ==
=== Rangers ===
==== Early career ====
A youth product of Rangers who was their Academy Player of the Year for 2018–19 having won the SPFL Reserve League, the Under-18 League and the Scottish Youth Cup in that season plus the Glasgow Cup in the prior campaign, McPake signed a new contract on 10 July 2019, which will keep him at the club until the summer of 2022. A week later he made his debut in a qualifying match against Gibraltese St Joseph's at Ibrox, coming on as a 67th minute substitute for Greg Docherty.

==== Loan spells ====
On 20 August 2019, McPake joined Scottish Championship side Dundee on a loan until the following January. After an ankle injury hindered his progress with the Dark Blues, McPake spent the last few weeks of his loan spell back at Rangers, and officially returned in January.

In September 2020, McPake joined Greenock Morton on loan until January with an option to extend. On 8 January 2021, McPake joined League Two side Harrogate Town on loan for the remainder of the 2020–21 season. McPake impressed during his loan spell with Harrogate, making 21 appearances for the club.

On 1 July 2021, McPake signed a new contract with Rangers until summer 2024 and immediately joined newly-promoted League One side Morecambe, with a recall option in January 2022.

On 5 January 2022, McPake joined EFL League Two side Tranmere Rovers on loan for the remainder of 2021–22 season.

On 23 July 2022, McPake joined Scottish Championship side Queen's Park on a season-long loan. He would make his debut for the club the same day in a Scottish League Cup group stage game against Hamilton Academical. McPake would net his first and second goals for the Spiders in a thrashing away victory over Partick Thistle in October.

On 1 September 2023, McPake left Rangers by mutual consent.

=== Stirling Albion ===
After training with clubs such as Dunfermline Athletic after being released by Rangers, McPake signed a deal on 23 February 2024 with Scottish League One club Stirling Albion until the end of the season. McPake made his debut the following day against Edinburgh City, and marked his first game as a Bino with a free kick goal in a 4–0 victory.

=== St Johnstone ===
On 20 June 2024 following a successful trial period, McPake joined Scottish Premiership club St Johnstone on a two-year deal. He made his debut for the Saints in a victory over Brechin City in the Scottish League Cup group stage. On 5 January 2025, McPake scored his first St Johnstone goal in a losing effort at home to his former loan club Dundee.

On 2 August 2025, McPake scored a hat-trick in a 5–1 home win over Partick Thistle. After scoring 4 goals in as many games to start the season, McPake was awarded the SPFL Championship Player of the Month award for August 2025. McPake would score 19 goals in all competitions for the Saints, finishing as the Championship's top scorer and winning the Scottish Championship with St Johnstone. Individually, McPake won both the SPFL and PFA Scotland Championship player of the year awards and was named in PFA Scotland's PFA Scotland's Championship Team of the Year.

=== Heart of Midlothian ===
McPake agreed to join Scottish Premiership club Heart of Midlothian on a three-year deal at the beginning of the 2026–27 season, when his contract with St Johnstone was due to expire.

== International career ==
McPake has played for Scotland at youth level, representing the under 17s, under 18s and under 19s. He received his first-ever senior call-up in September 2026 when he was named in the squad for the UEFA Nations League qualifiers against Slovenia, Switzerland and North Macedonia. He made his international debut on 6 October in their home match against Slovenia.

== Career statistics ==
As of 22 November 2026

Appearances and goals by club, season and competition
Club	Season	League			National cup (Note: Includes Scottish Cup)		League cup (Note: Includes Scottish League Cup, EFL Cup)		Other		Total	
Club	Season	Division	Apps	Goals	Apps	Goals	Apps	Goals	Apps	Goals	Apps	Goals
Rangers	2019–20	Scottish Premiership	—		—		—		1 (Note: Appearance in UEFA Europa League)	0	1	0
Dundee (loan)	2019–20	Scottish Championship	7	0	0	0	0	0	0	0	7	0
Greenock Morton (loan)	2020–21	Scottish Championship	6	0	0	0	4	0	0	0	10	0
Harrogate Town (loan)	2020–21	League Two	23	4	—		—		1 (Note: Appearance in FA Trophy)	0	24	4
Morecambe (loan)	2021–22	League One	5	0	0	0	1	0	1	0	7	0
Tranmere Rovers (loan)	2021–22	League Two	14	1	0	0	0	0	0	0	14	1
Queen's Park (loan)	2022–23	Scottish Championship	27	3	1	0	1	0	4 (Note: Three appearances in Scottish Challenge Cup, one appearances in the Scottish Premiership play-offs)	1	33	4
Stirling Albion	2023–24	Scottish League One	12	4	—		—		2 (Note: Appearance(s) in the Scottish League One play-offs)	0	14	4
St Johnstone	2024–25	Scottish Premiership	13	1	1	0	2	0	0	0	16	1
St Johnstone	2025–26	Scottish Championship	33	16	1	0	5	1	2	2	41	19
St Johnstone	Total		46	17	2	0	7	1	2	2	57	20
Heart of Midlothian	2026–27	Scottish Premiership	11	3	0	0	2	0	7 (Note: Two appearances in the UEFA Europa League, two appearances in the UEFA Conference League)	0	20	3
Career total			151	32	3	0	15	1	18	3	187	36

=== International ===
As of match played 6 October 2026

Appearances and goals by national team and year
National team	Year	Apps	Goals
Scotland	2026	1	0
Total		1	0

== Honours ==
Harrogate Town

- FA Trophy: 2019–20

St Johnstone

- Scottish Championship: 2025–26

Individual

- PFA Scotland Players' Player of the Year: 2025–26 Scottish Championship
