= Ross Sinclair (footballer) =

Scottish football player (born 2001)

Personal information
- Date of birth: 7 May 2001 (age 25)
- Height: 1.97 m (6 ft 5 1/2 in)
- Position: Goalkeeper

Team information
- Current team: ST JOHNSTONE FC

Youth career
- –2019: St Johnstone

Senior career*
Years	Team	Apps	(Gls)
2019–	St Johnstone	13	(0)
2019–2020	→ Brechin City (loan)	6	(0)
2020–2021	→ Cowdenbeath (loan)	4	(0)
2022–2023	→ Montrose (loan)	19	(0)
2026	→ St Mirren (loan)	7	(0)

International career
2021–2022	Scotland U-21	3	(0)
- * Club domestic league appearances and goals as of 26 April 2026

Ross Sinclair (born 7 May 2001) is a Scottish footballer who plays as a goalkeeper for St. Mirren, on loan from Scottish Premiership club St Johnstone.

== Early life ==
Sinclair is from Scone and attended Perth Academy. He joined the football academy at St Johnstone when he was 12 years-old.

== Club career ==
Sinclair played on loan at Brechin City F.C. and Cowdenbeath F.C. in the Scottish League Two. He signed a three-year professional contract with St Johnstone in May 2021. Sinclair joined Montrose F.C. in Scottish League One on loan in July 2022.

Sinclair made his Scottish Premiership debut for St Johnstone in May 2023 against Ross County. He then played the next game against Livingston F.C. and kept a clean sheet. He received praise from on-loan goalkeeper Remi Matthews for his performances.

Sinclair started two matches for St Johnstone in the Scottish League Cup at the start of the 2023–24 season, but suffered a double break of his arm and an elbow dislocation in a behind closed doors friendly in August 2023, which had to be operated on. He returned at the start of the 2024–25 season, competing for the starting position with new signing Josh Rae.

Sinclair joined St Mirren on an emergency loan in April 2026, making his debut for the club on 25 April 2026 against Livingston in the Premiership.

== Style of play ==
Former St Johnstone goalkeeper Alan Mannus has praised Sinclair for his ability to play out from the back with his feet.

== International career ==
Sinclair was called up to represent Scotland at under-21 level in September 2021. That month, he made his debut for the Scotland U-21 team against Turkey U-21.

== Career statistics ==
=== Club ===
As of match played 18 May 2025

Appearances and goals by club, season and competition
Club	Season	League			Scottish Cup		League cup		Other		Total	
Club	Season	Division	Apps	Goals	Apps	Goals	Apps	Goals	Apps	Goals	Apps	Goals
St Johnstone U20	2017–18	—			—		—		1 (Note: Appearance(s) in Scottish Challenge Cup)	0	1	0
St Johnstone U20	2018–19	—			—		—		1	0	1	0
St Johnstone U20	2021–22	—			—		—		1	0	1	0
St Johnstone U20	Total		—		—		—		3	0	3	0
St Johnstone	2019–20	Scottish Premiership	0	0	0	0	0	0	—		0	0
St Johnstone	2020–21	Scottish Premiership	0	0	0	0	0	0	—		0	0
St Johnstone	2021–22	Scottish Premiership	0	0	0	0	0	0	0	0	0	0
St Johnstone	2022–23	Scottish Premiership	2	0	0	0	0	0	—		2	0
St Johnstone	2023–24	Scottish Premiership	0	0	0	0	2	0	—		2	0
St Johnstone	2024–25	Scottish Premiership	11	0	0	0	0	0	—		11	0
St Johnstone	2025–26	Scottish Championship	0	0	0	0	0	0	0	0	0	0
St Johnstone	Total		13	0	0	0	2	0	0	0	15	0
Brechin City (loan)	2019–20	Scottish League Two	6	0	0	0	1	0	1	0	8	0
Cowdenbeath (loan)	2020–21	Scottish League Two	4	0	0	0	4	0	—		8	0
Montrose (loan)	2022–23	Scottish League One	19	0	0	0	0	0	1	0	20	0
Career total			42	0	0	0	7	0	5	0	54	0
