= Makenzie Kirk =

Northern Irish footballer

Personal information
- Full name: Makenzie Andrew Kirk
- Date of birth: 6 February 2004 (age 22)
- Place of birth: Edinburgh, Scotland
- Height: 1.84 m (6 ft 0 in)
- Position: Forward

Team information
- Current team: Barnsley (on loan from Portsmouth)
- Number: 9

Senior career*
Years	Team	Apps	(Gls)
2022–2024	Heart of Midlothian	1	(0)
2024	→ Hamilton Academical (loan)	8	(0)
2024–2025	St Johnstone	37	(8)
2025–	Portsmouth	14	(1)
2026–	→ Barnsley (loan)	8	(2)

International career
2022–2023	Northern Ireland U19	6	(1)
2024–	Northern Ireland U21	13	(2)
- * Club domestic league appearances and goals as of 16:35, 24 October 2026 (UTC)

Makenzie Andrew Kirk (born 6 February 2004) is a Northern Irish professional footballer who plays as a forward for EFL League One club Barnsley, on loan from EFL Championship club for Portsmouth. He is also a Northern Ireland U-19 international. His previous clubs are Heart of Midlothian and he had a spell out on loan at Hamilton Academical.

== Career ==
=== Heart of Midlothian ===
A product of the Hearts academy, he signed his first professional contract with the club as a 16 year-old in September 2020. Kirk made his Scottish Premiership debut on 2 April 2022, appearing as a second-half substitute for Hearts away against Ross County in a 1-1 draw.

Kirk signed a new one-year contract with the club in May 2023. Kirk's scoring streak in the Lowland Football League for the Hearts Reserve team tallied 34 goals in 39 games by October 2023, including 17 goals in his first 13 games of the 2023–24 season.

==== Hamilton Academical (loan) ====
On 5 January 2024, Kirk joined Scottish League One side Hamilton Academical on loan until the end of the season.

=== St Johnstone ===
In July 2024, he signed for Scottish Premiership side St Johnstone for an undisclosed fee.

=== Portsmouth ===
On 1 September 2025, Kirk signed with EFL Championship club Portsmouth on a three-year deal.

==== Barnsley (loan) ====
On July 16, 2026, Kirk joined Barnsley on a season-long loan.

== Style of play ==
Hearts manager Robbie Neilson described Kirk as a "natural finisher" after he made his debut as an 18 year-old in the Scottish Premiership.

== Personal life ==
Kirk is the son of former Northern Ireland international football player Andy Kirk. Also MaKenzie has a brother named Corey Kirk who plays for Livingston B team.

== Career statistics ==
As of match played 24 October 2026

Appearances and goals by club, season and competition
Club	Season	League			National cup (Note: Includes FA Cup, Scottish Cup)		League cup (Note: Includes EFL Cup, Scottish League Cup)		Other		Total	
Club	Season	Division	Apps	Goals	Apps	Goals	Apps	Goals	Apps	Goals	Apps	Goals
Heart of Midlothian	2021–22	Scottish Premiership	1	0	0	0	0	0	—		1	0
Heart of Midlothian	2022–23	Scottish Premiership	0	0	0	0	0	0	—		0	0
Heart of Midlothian	2023–24	Scottish Premiership	0	0	0	0	0	0	—		0	0
Heart of Midlothian	Total		1	0	0	0	0	0	0	0	1	0
Hamilton Academical (loan)	2023–24	Scottish League One	8	0	0	0	0	0	—		8	0
St Johnstone	2024–25	Scottish Premiership	35	8	4	1	4	1	—		43	10
St Johnstone	2025–26	Scottish Championship	2	0	0	0	5	4	—		7	4
St Johnstone	Total		37	8	4	1	9	5	0	0	50	14
Portsmouth	2025–26	Championship	14	1	0	0	0	0	—		14	1
Portsmouth	2026–27	Championship	0	0	0	0	0	0	—		0	0
Portsmouth	Total		14	1	0	0	0	0	0	0	14	1
Barnsley (loan)	2026–27	League One	8	2	0	0	2	0	—		10	2
Career total			68	11	4	1	11	5	0	0	83	17
