= Dimitar Mitov =

Bulgarian footballer (born 1997)

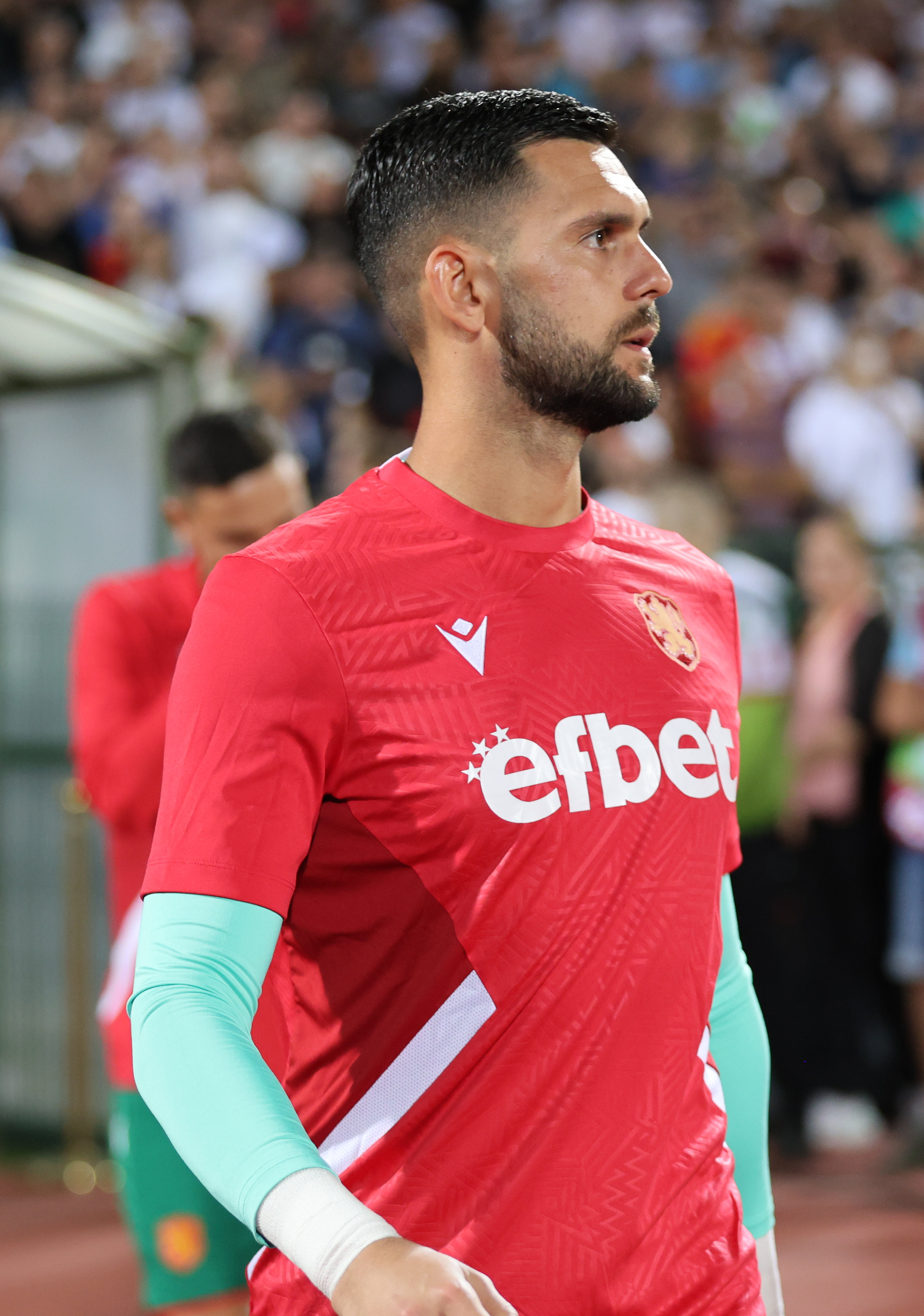

Personal information
- Full name: Dimitar Veselinov Mitov
- Date of birth: 22 January 1997 (age 29)
- Place of birth: Montana, Bulgaria
- Height: 1.93 m (6 ft 4 in)
- Position: Goalkeeper

Team information
- Current team: St. Pauli
- Number: 33

Youth career
- 2008–2013: Chavdar Etropole
- 2013–2015: Charlton Athletic

Senior career*
Years	Team	Apps	(Gls)
2015–2017	Charlton Athletic	0	(0)
2015	→ Canvey Island (loan)	1	(0)
2017–2023	Cambridge United	146	(0)
2023–2024	St Johnstone	38	(0)
2024–2026	Aberdeen	56	(0)
2026–	St. Pauli	0	(0)

International career^{‡}
- Bulgaria U16
2013	Bulgaria U17	5	(0)
2014–2015	Bulgaria U19	3	(0)
2023–	Bulgaria	15	(0)
- * Club domestic league appearances and goals as of 20 May 2026 ‡ National team caps and goals as of 17:07, 30 March 2026 (UTC)

Dimitar Veselinov Mitov (Bulgarian: Димитър Веселинов Митов; born 22 January 1997) is a Bulgarian professional footballer who plays as a goalkeeper for 2. Bundesliga club St. Pauli and the Bulgaria national team.

== Club career ==
=== Early career in Bulgaria ===
Born in Montana, Mitov spent part of his childhood in Kozloduy, where he began training football at the age of nine. Initially, he was deployed as an outfield player. After a short stint with Dunav Selanovtsi, in 2009, at age 12, he had a successful tryout with Hristo Stoichkov's academy and joined the ranks of Chavdar Etropole.

=== Charlton Athletic ===
Mitov joined Charlton Athletic in 2013 from Chavdar Etropole, after undergoing a trial at Nottingham Forest. In April 2015, he scored a goal from his own six-yard box against Coventry City U18's, gaining press attention. He featured for the club at under-18, under-21 and under-23 level but did not make a senior appearance for the club.

==== Canvey Island (loan) ====
In February 2015, Mitov joined Isthmian League Premier Division club Canvey Island on a one-month loan. He made a single appearance in a 1–1 draw with Lewes on 28 February 2015.

=== Cambridge United ===
Following his release from Charlton Athletic, Mitov joined EFL League Two club Cambridge United on a two-year contract. On 8 August 2017, he made his debut for the club in a 4–1 EFL Cup defeat to Bristol Rovers. Mitov's first league appearances for Cambridge came in the final three games of the 2017–18 season, playing against Morecambe, Newport County and Port Vale.

On 16 May 2018, he extended his contract with Cambridge United. The contract kept him at the club until 2021 and was subsequently extended. During the 2018–19 season, Mitov replaced David Forde as the first choice goalkeeper; he went on to make a total amount of 21 league appearances in total over the season.

During the 2020–21 season, Mitov made 20 league appearances as United gained promotion to League One.

On 23 August 2021, Mitov won Carabao Cup First Round Player of the Round for his performance in a match against Swindon Town, which the U's won on penalties. On 8 January 2022, he gained attention for his performance after his team caused a major upset by beating Premier League side Newcastle United 1–0 at St James’ Park in the third round of the FA Cup, making numerous saves to keep them in the game. United ended the season 14th in the League One table. On 30 April 2022, Mitov was named United's Player of the Season.

Mitov helped the U's dramatically stay up in League One on the final day of the 2022–23 season, with a 2–0 win over Forest Green Rovers. Following the season's conclusion, he left United upon the expiration of his contract, having been with the club for six years and making 146 appearances.

=== St Johnstone ===
On 14 July 2023, Mitov joined Scottish Premiership club St Johnstone on a two-year contract. On 26 August, he kept his first clean sheet of the season in a goalless league draw against Celtic. Mitov helped keep up St Johnstone on the final day of the season, saving a crucial penalty in a 2–1 defeat of Motherwell. He subsequently won all but one of the club's Player of the Season awards.

=== Aberdeen ===
On 19 June 2024, Mitov signed for fellow Scottish Premiership club Aberdeen on a three-year contract for an undisclosed fee. According to Mitov, he chose to move to Aberdeen because of the club's "huge history". He made an instant impact at the club, saving a penalty in a 1–0 win over Ross County. Mitov heavily contributed to an early 13-match winning streak for the Dons under new manager Jimmy Thelin. On 09 November 2024, he saved yet another penalty in a 4–1 win over Dundee. On 1 December 2024, he suffered a long-term hamstring injury in the 46th minute of a match against Heart of Midlothian, and was replaced by Ross Doohan.

On 24 May 2025, after returning from injury, he saved two penalties in the shoot-out of the final as Aberdeen beat Celtic to win the Scottish Cup for the first time since 1990.

=== FC St. Pauli ===
Mitov joined Bundesliga club FC St. Pauli in August 2026, reportedly on a three-year contract and for a transfer fee of about £450,000.

== International career ==
Mitov has represented Bulgaria at every age level from under-16 to under-19. He also captained his nation at under-17 and under-19 level.

In August 2023, he received his first call-up to the Bulgarian senior national team by head coach Mladen Krstajić, for a friendly game against Iran and a UEFA Euro 2024 qualifying game against Montenegro. On 7 September 2023, Mitov earned his first cap, playing the full 90 minutes in a 1–0 loss against the former. He has since taken over the number 1 shirt from the likes of Daniel Naumov and Ivan Dyulgerov. He kept his first international clean sheet in a 1–0 win over Tanzania in March 2024, and played every game of the 2024 Nations League group stage for Bulgaria.

== Career statistics ==
=== Club ===
As of match played 5 October 2025

Appearances and goals by club, season and competition
Club	Season	League			National cup		League cup		Europe		Other		Total	
Club	Season	Division	Apps	Goals	Apps	Goals	Apps	Goals	Apps	Goals	Apps	Goals	Apps	Goals
Charlton Athletic	2014–15	Championship	0	0	0	0	0	0	0	0	0	0	0	0
Charlton Athletic	2015–16	Championship	0	0	0	0	0	0	0	0	0	0	0	0
Charlton Athletic	2016–17	League One	0	0	0	0	0	0	0	0	0	0	0	0
Charlton Athletic	Total		0	0	0	0	0	0	0	0	0	0	0	0
Canvey Island (loan)	2014–15	Isthmian League Premier Division	1	0	0	0	0	0	0	0	0	0	1	0
Cambridge United	2017–18	League Two	3	0	0	0	1	0	0	0	3	0	7	0
Cambridge United	2018–19	League Two	21	0	0	0	1	0	0	0	3	0	25	0
Cambridge United	2019–20	League Two	27	0	0	0	0	0	0	0	0	0	27	0
Cambridge United	2020–21	League Two	20	0	1	0	1	0	0	0	0	0	22	0
Cambridge United	2021–22	League One	42	0	5	0	2	0	0	0	2	0	51	0
Cambridge United	2022–23	League One	33	0	0	0	0	0	0	0	0	0	33	0
Cambridge United	Total		146	0	6	0	5	0	0	0	8	0	165	0
St Johnstone	2023–24	Scottish Premiership	38	0	1	0	2	0	0	0	0	0	41	0
Aberdeen	2024–25	Scottish Premiership	24	0	3	0	6	0	0	0	0	0	33	0
Aberdeen	2025–26	Scottish Premiership	7	0	0	0	2	0	3	0	0	0	12	0
Aberdeen	Total		31	0	3	0	2	0	3	0	0	0	45	0
Career total			216	0	10	0	15	0	3	0	8	0	251	0

=== International ===
As of match played 30 March 2026

Appearances and goals by national team and year
National team	Year	Apps	Goals
Bulgaria	2023	2	0
Bulgaria	2024	7	0
Bulgaria	2025	5	0
Bulgaria	2026	1	0
Total		15	0

== Honours ==
Aberdeen

- Scottish Cup: 2024–25

Individual

- Cambridge United Player of the Year: 2021–22
- St Johnstone Players' Player of the Year: 2023–24
- St Johnstone Jailer Tours’ Player of the Year: 2023–24
