= Max Kucheryavyi =

Ukrainian footballer (born 2002)

Max Kucheriavyi
Personal information
- Full name: Maksym Serhiyovych Kucheryavyi
- Date of birth: 9 May 2002 (age 24)
- Place of birth: Kyiv, Ukraine
- Position: Midfielder

Team information
- Current team: Caspiy
- Number: 18

Youth career
- 2015–2021: DYuSSh-15 Kyiv

Senior career*
Years	Team	Apps	(Gls)
2021–2025	St Johnstone	36	(2)
2021–2022	→ Brechin City (loan)		
2022	→ Kelty Hearts (loan)	12	(1)
2023	→ Falkirk (loan)	13	(1)
2026–	Caspiy	9	(0)

International career^{‡}
2019	Ukraine U17	1	(0)
2022–2023	Ukraine U21	5	(1)
2024	Ukraine U23	4	(0)
- * Club domestic league appearances and goals as of 1 November 2026 ‡ National team caps and goals as of 18:16, 19 June 2025 (UTC)

Maksym Serhiyovych Kucheryavyi (Ukrainian: Максим Сергійович Кучерявий; born 9 May 2002) is a Ukrainian professional footballer who plays as a midfielder for Kazakhstan Premier League club Caspiy.

== Club career ==
Kucheriavyi was born in Kyiv, and played locally for DYuSSh-15 Kyiv.

After playing in a youth tournament in the city, Kucheriavyi was scouted by Scottish club Heart of Midlothian, and travelled 2,500 miles between the countries to train, for a period of two years. After failing to gain a contract with Hearts, he instead signed with St Johnstone on a three-year deal.

At the start of the 2021–22 season, he moved on loan to Brechin City. After a "brilliant spell" with the club, scoring nine goals in 19 appearances, he was recalled by St Johnstone in January 2022. He then moved on loan to Kelty Hearts, and in March 2022 he scored the winning goal which guaranteed Kelty's Scottish League Two title.

He moved on loan to Falkirk in February 2023.

Kucheriavyi scored his first league goals for St Johnstone on 2 September 2023, scoring two late goals to earn a 2–2 draw.

At the start of the 2024–25 season, St Johnstone manager Craig Levein said he could go out on loan. He left St Johnstone at the end of the 2024–25 season, criticising the club's management following relegation.

In April 2026 he signed for Kazakh club Caspiy.

== International career ==
Kucheriavyi has played for the Ukraine under-17 team.

In May 2024, he was called up by Ruslan Rotan to the Ukraine Olympic football team squad to play at the 2024 Maurice Revello Tournament in France. He won the tournament.

== Career statistics ==
As of match played on 25 January 2025

Appearances and goals by club, season and competition
Club	Season	League			Scottish Cup		League Cup		Other		Total	
Club	Season	Division	Apps	Goals	Apps	Goals	Apps	Goals	Apps	Goals	Apps	Goals
St Johnstone	2021–22	Scottish Premiership	0	0	0	0	0	0	1 (Note: Appearance(s) in the Scottish League Challenge Cup)	0	1	0
St Johnstone	2022–23	Scottish Premiership	4	0	0	0	3	0	2	0	9	0
St Johnstone	2023–24	Scottish Premiership	29	2	0	0	4	1	0	0	33	3
St Johnstone	2024–25	Scottish Premiership	3	0	0	0	2	0	0	0	5	0
St Johnstone	Total		36	2	0	0	9	1	3	0	48	3
Kelty Hearts (loan)	2021–22	Scottish League Two	12	1	0	0	0	0	0	0	12	1
Falkirk (loan)	2022–23	Scottish League One	13	1	2	0	0	0	2 (Note: Appearances in the play-offs)	0	17	1
Career total			61	4	2	0	9	1	5	0	77	5

== Personal life ==
Following the 2022 Russian invasion of Ukraine, Kucheriavyi spoke about the impact on his family in the country. He also launched a fundraiser.

== Honours ==
Kelty Hearts

- Scottish League Two: 2021–22
