= MandM Direct =

Online clothing store in the United Kingdom

MandM
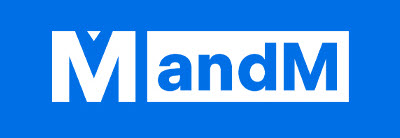
- Company type: Subsidiary
- Industry: Clothing retail
- Founded: 1987
- Headquarters: Hereford, United Kingdom
- Key people: Mike Tomkins, Chairman
- Owner: Bestseller
- Number of employees: 1,100
- Website: https://www.mandmdirect.com/

MandM, also known as MandM Direct, is a British online fashion retailer based in Hereford, England, owned by the Danish clothing company, Bestseller. It sells its products exclusively over the Internet and was the second largest online fashion retailer in the UK in the 2010s. It specialises in buying clearance stock from manufacturers and selling at discounted prices. They stock over 150 brands including Adidas, Timberland, Diesel and Puma.

== History ==
The company was started as M and M Sports in 1987 by Mark Ellis and Martin Churchward.

Following a buy-out led by Mike Tomkins, private equity group ECI Partners took a majority shareholding in 2004. The company’s identity changed to MandM Direct in order to reflect their move into selling fashion and lifestyle brands.

In 2007 US private equity group, TA Associates completed major investment and the logistics operation moved to new warehousing in Herefordshire.

2009 saw expansion into Europe which led to German language and later French language sites being created.

In 2014, according to the reports, Danish fashion group Bestseller United purchased MandM Direct Ltd for £140 million ($235 million), with Mike Tomkins becoming a minority shareholder.

The company was a back-of-the-shirt sponsor for Hereford United until 2012.

MandM are an official partner of Teenage Cancer Trust and has raised over £3 million.

In 2025 they signed a new 5 year deal with Hereford United’s phoenix club, Hereford FC, as a club sponsor. The deal includes MandM acting as the clubs kit supplier, and naming rights over their stadium, Edgar Street.

MandM supports various charities and worthy causes, including the Harris Federation and has donated thousands of kits.

Starting from the 2025–26 season, in a multi-year agreement, MandM will be the front-of-shirt sponsor for Scottish football club St. Johnstone men's and women's teams.

The company currently employs 1,100 people

== Location ==
The company headquarters is in Hereford, Herefordshire, with the main warehouse facility being based at Moreton on Lugg just off the A49.
