= 2025–26 Scottish Championship =

Scottish Championship
- Season: 2025–26
- Dates: 1 August 2025 – 1 May 2026
- Champions: St Johnstone
- Promoted: St Johnstone
- Relegated: Airdrieonians; Ross County
- Matches: 180
- Goals: 438 (2.43 per match)
- Top goalscorer: Josh McPake (16 goals)
- Biggest home win: Raith Rovers 6–0 Ross County (13 December 2025)
- Biggest away win: Arbroath 0–5 Dunfermline Athletic (13 September 2025)
- Highest scoring: St Johnstone 4–3 Queen's Park (15 November 2025)
- Longest winning run: Partick Thistle; 5 games
- Longest unbeaten run: St Johnstone; 14 games
- Longest winless run: Airdrieonians; 11 games
- Longest losing run: Greenock Morton; Ross County; 4 games
- Highest attendance: 7,729; St Johnstone v Raith Rovers (24 April 2026)
- Lowest attendance: 718; Queen's Park v Ross County (3 February 2026)
- Total attendance: 518,760
- Average attendance: 2,882
- All statistics correct as of 1 May 2026.

The 2025–26 Scottish Championship (known as the William Hill Championship for sponsorship reasons) was the 13th season of the Scottish Championship, the second tier of Scottish football. The season began on 1 August 2025.

Ten teams contested the league: Airdrieonians, Arbroath, Ayr United, Dunfermline Athletic, Greenock Morton, Partick Thistle, Queen's Park, Raith Rovers, Ross County and St Johnstone.

== Teams ==
The following teams changed division after the 2024–25 season.

=== To Championship ===
Promoted from League One

- Arbroath

Relegated from the Premiership

- Ross County
- St Johnstone

=== From Championship ===
Relegated to League One

- Hamilton Academical

Promoted to the Premiership

- Falkirk
- Livingston

=== Stadia and locations ===
Airdrieonians	Arbroath	Ayr United	Dunfermline Athletic
Excelsior Stadium	Gayfield Park	Somerset Park	East End Park
Capacity: 10,101	Capacity: 6,056	Capacity: 10,185	Capacity: 11,480
Greenock Morton	Location of teams in 2025–26 Scottish Championship		Partick Thistle
Cappielow	Location of teams in 2025–26 Scottish Championship		Firhill Stadium
Capacity: 11,589	Location of teams in 2025–26 Scottish Championship		Capacity: 10,887
Queen's Park	Raith Rovers	Ross County	St Johnstone
Lesser Hampden	Stark's Park	Victoria Park	McDiarmid Park
Capacity: 990	Capacity: 8,867	Capacity: 6,541	Capacity: 10,696

Championship football clubs in Glasgow

=== Personnel and kits ===
Team	Manager	Captain	Kit manufacturer	Shirt sponsor
Airdrieonians	(Antigua and Barbuda) Aaron Taylor-Sinclair	(Scotland) Aidan Wilson	Joma	Holemasters
Arbroath	(Scotland) David Gold (Scotland) Colin Hamilton	(Scotland) Thomas O'Brien	Macron	Megatech
Ayr United	(Scotland) John Rankin (interim)	(England) Ben Dempsey	O'Neills	Jewson
Dunfermline Athletic	(Northern Ireland) Neil Lennon	(Scotland) Kyle Benedictus	Erreà	Gamdom
Greenock Morton	(Scotland) Ian Murray	(Scotland) Grant Gillespie	Joma	Dalrada Technology
Partick Thistle	(Scotland) Mark Wilson	(Scotland) Lee Ashcroft	O'Neills	WrightKerr All Trades Limited
Queen's Park	(Scotland) Sean Crighton	(Scotland) Euan Murray	Adidas	City Facilities Management
Raith Rovers	(Scotland) Dougie Imrie	(Scotland) Scott Brown	Joma	Audio Emotion (Home); Sephra (Away)
Ross County	(Scotland) Stuart Kettlewell	(Scotland) Declan Gallagher	Macron	Ross-shire Engineering
St Johnstone	(Finland) Simo Valakari	(Scotland) Jason Holt	Macron	MandM

=== Managerial changes ===
Team	Outgoing manager	Manner of departure	Date of vacancy	Position in table	Incoming manager	Date of appointment
Partick Thistle	(Scotland) Brian Graham (interim)	End of interim spell	30 May 2025	Pre-season	(Scotland) Mark Wilson	30 May 2025
Airdrieonians	(Scotland) Rhys McCabe	Resigned	15 August 2025	9th	(Scotland) Danny Lennon	27 August 2025
Ross County	(Scotland) Don Cowie	Sacked	24 August 2025	10th	(Scotland) Tony Docherty	3 September 2025
Airdrieonians	(Scotland) Danny Lennon	Sacked	22 October 2025	10th	(Antigua and Barbuda) Aaron Taylor-Sinclair	24 October 2025 (interim) & 1 January 2026 (permanent)
Raith Rovers	(Scotland) Barry Robson	Sacked	11 November 2025	6th	(Scotland) Dougie Imrie	25 November 2025
Greenock Morton	(Scotland) Dougie Imrie	Joined Raith Rovers	25 November 2025	7th	(Scotland) Ian Murray	2 January 2026
Ross County	(Scotland) Tony Docherty	Mutual consent	14 December 2025	10th	(Scotland) Stuart Kettlewell	30 December 2025
Ayr United	(Scotland) Scott Brown	Mutual consent	30 March 2026	8th	(Scotland) John Rankin (interim)	31 March 2026

== League table ==
Pos	Team	Pld	W	D	L	GF	GA	GD	Pts	Promotion, qualification or relegation
1	St Johnstone (C, P)	36	22	11	3	67	25	+42	77	Promotion to the Premiership
2	Partick Thistle	36	17	15	4	53	36	+17	66	Qualification for the Premiership play-off semi-final
3	Arbroath	36	13	13	10	43	41	+2	52	Qualification for the Premiership play-off quarter-final
4	Dunfermline Athletic	36	14	9	13	52	41	+11	51	Qualification for the Premiership play-off quarter-final
5	Raith Rovers	36	12	9	15	43	42	+1	45	
6	Queen's Park	36	9	14	13	35	48	−13	41	
7	Ayr United	36	8	15	13	38	47	−9	39	
8	Greenock Morton	36	8	14	14	36	52	−16	38	
9	Airdrieonians (R)	36	8	12	16	35	49	−14	36	Qualification for the Championship play-offs
10	Ross County (R)	36	8	10	18	36	57	−21	34	Relegation to League One

Rules for classification: 1) Points; 2) Goal difference; 3) Goals scored; 4) Head-to head points; 5) Head-to-head goal difference; 6) Play-off (only for deciding promotion, play-off participation and relegation).
(C) Champions; (P) Promoted; (R) Relegated

== Results ==
Teams play each other four times, twice in the first half of the season (home and away) and twice in the second half of the season (home and away), making a total of 180 games, with each team playing 36.

=== First half of season (Matches 1–18) ===
Home \ Away	AIR	ARB	AYR	DNF	GMO	PAR	QPA	RAI	ROS	STJ
Airdrieonians	—	1–0	0–1	0–4	1–2	1–1	1–1	0–0	2–2	1–2
Arbroath	1–0	—	1–1	0–5	1–1	2–1	4–1	0–0	3–0	3–1
Ayr United	4–2	1–1	—	0–1	2–1	0–0	1–1	0–1	1–1	2–4
Dunfermline Athletic	2–0	1–2	0–1	—	1–0	0–2	0–0	2–0	2–2	2–2
Greenock Morton	0–1	1–0	2–2	0–0	—	1–1	2–1	0–1	1–1	0–4
Partick Thistle	2–1	1–1	2–1	1–0	1–1	—	5–0	3–2	1–0	2–1
Queen's Park	0–0	1–3	0–0	1–1	0–0	0–1	—	2–1	0–1	1–2
Raith Rovers	0–3	3–0	0–2	2–0	1–1	2–0	1–1	—	6–0	0–2
Ross County	1–2	1–2	3–3	3–2	0–3	1–3	1–2	2–0	—	0–1
St Johnstone	3–0	3–0	0–0	2–1	1–1	5–1	4–3	0–0	0–0	—

Legend: Blue = home team win; Yellow = draw; Red = away team win.

=== Second half of season (Matches 19–36) ===
Home \ Away	AIR	ARB	AYR	DNF	GMO	PAR	QPA	RAI	ROS	STJ
Airdrieonians	—	0–0	2–1	2–2	3–1	2–2	0–3	0–0	0–1	0–1
Arbroath	1–1	—	1–1	4–2	1–1	0–0	1–0	2–1	0–0	2–4
Ayr United	1–1	1–0	—	0–3	0–1	1–1	1–2	2–1	0–0	0–1
Dunfermline Athletic	0–2	0–0	2–3	—	3–1	2–2	1–0	3–0	3–0	0–2
Greenock Morton	1–1	2–1	1–1	2–0	—	1–2	0–0	0–0	2–1	0–2
Partick Thistle	1–0	0–0	2–1	2–0	3–2	—	1–1	0–0	3–1	0–0
Queen's Park	1–0	2–1	1–1	0–2	3–2	2–2	—	0–2	1–0	1–1
Raith Rovers	3–1	2–3	3–0	1–2	3–2	0–2	4–1	—	3–2	0–0
Ross County	0–4	0–2	2–1	2–2	4–0	2–0	0–1	2–0	—	0–0
St Johnstone	4–0	1–0	3–1	0–1	5–0	2–2	1–1	2–0	1–0	—

Legend: Blue = home team win; Yellow = draw; Red = away team win.

== Season statistics ==
As of 1 May 2026

=== Scoring ===
==== Top scorers ====
Rank	Player	Club	Goals
1	(Scotland) Josh McPake	St Johnstone	16
2	(Scotland) Andrew Tod	Dunfermline Athletic	13
3	(Scotland) Findlay Marshall	Arbroath	12
3	(England) Josh Fowler	Queen's Park; St Johnstone	12
5	(Scotland) Jamie Gullan	St Johnstone	11
6	(Scotland) Euan Henderson	Airdrieonians	10

== Awards ==
Month	Manager of the Month		Player of the Month	
Month	Manager	Club	Player	Club
August	(Finland) Simo Valakari	St Johnstone	(Scotland) Josh McPake	St Johnstone
September	(Finland) Simo Valakari	St Johnstone	(Scotland) Josh McPake	St Johnstone
October	(Scotland) Mark Wilson	Partick Thistle	(Scotland) Findlay Marshall	Arbroath
November	(Scotland) Mark Wilson	Partick Thistle	(Scotland) Aidan Fitzpatrick	Partick Thistle
December	(Scotland) David Gold (Scotland) Colin Hamilton	Arbroath	(Scotland) Josh McPake	St Johnstone
January	(Scotland) Mark Wilson	Partick Thistle	(Scotland) Tony Watt	Partick Thistle
February	(Scotland) Stuart Kettlewell	Ross County	(Scotland) Jamie Gullan	St Johnstone
March	(Scotland) Mark Wilson	Partick Thistle	(Scotland) Callumn Morrison	Dunfermline Athletic
April	(Finland) Simo Valakari	St Johnstone	(Scotland) Jamie Gullan	St Johnstone

== Championship play-offs ==
=== Bracket ===
Semi-finals
1	Airdrieonians	0	1	1
4	Alloa Athletic	1	2	3
2	Stenhousemuir	1	2	3
3	Queen of the South	1	2	3

Final
4	Alloa Athletic	1	1	2
2	Stenhousemuir	3	0	3

=== Semi-finals ===
==== First leg ====
5 May 2026	Alloa Athletic	1–0	Airdrieonians	Alloa
19:45	Taggart 19' (pen.)			Stadium: Recreation Park; Attendance: 1,040; Referee: Grant Irvine

5 May 2026	Queen of the South	1–1	Stenhousemuir	Dumfries
19:45	Lyon 90'		Buchanan 43'	Stadium: Palmerston Park; Attendance: 1,774; Referee: Lloyd Wilson

==== Second leg ====
9 May 2026	Airdrieonians	1–2 (1–3 agg.)	Alloa Athletic	Airdrie
15:00	Mahon 56'		Foster 41'; Adamson 87'	Stadium: Excelsior Stadium; Attendance: 1,381; Referee: Ross Hardie

9 May 2026	Stenhousemuir	2–2 (a.e.t.) (3–3 agg.) (4–3 p)	Queen of the South	Stenhousemuir
15:00	Aitken 4'; Whyte 103'		Clark 22', 117'	Stadium: Ochilview Park; Attendance: 1,178; Referee: Euan Anderson
	Penalties
	Buchanan (penalty scored); Aitken (penalty missed); Carrick (penalty scored); Anderson (penalty scored); Whyte (penalty scored)		Guthrie (penalty scored); Kennedy (penalty scored); Allan (penalty scored); Lyon (penalty missed); Clark (penalty missed)

=== Final ===
==== First leg ====
13 May 2026	Alloa Athletic	1–3	Stenhousemuir	Alloa
19:45	Waters 90'		Taylor 15'; Aitken 30' (pen.); Anderson 69'	Stadium: Recreation Park; Attendance: 1,023; Referee: Chris Graham

==== Second leg ====
16 May 2026	Stenhousemuir	0–1 (3–2 agg.)	Alloa Athletic	Stenhousemuir
17:30			O'Donnell 63'	Stadium: Ochilview Park; Attendance: 1,350; Referee: Dan McFarlane
