= Callum Hendry =

Association football player (born 1997)

Personal information
- Full name: Callum David Hendry
- Date of birth: 8 December 1997 (age 28)
- Place of birth: Lytham St Annes, England
- Height: 1.76 m (5 ft 9 1/2 in)
- Position: Forward

Team information
- Current team: Motherwell
- Number: 14

Youth career
- Blackburn Rovers

Senior career*
Years	Team	Apps	(Gls)
2015–2017	Blackburn Rovers	0	(0)
2015	→ Clitheroe (loan)		
2017–2022	St Johnstone	72	(17)
2018–2019	→ Brechin City (loan)	12	(1)
2021	→ Aberdeen (loan)	12	(2)
2021–2022	→ Kilmarnock (loan)	13	(4)
2022–2024	Salford City	66	(21)
2024–2025	Milton Keynes Dons	29	(3)
2025–	Motherwell	24	(0)
- * Club domestic league appearances and goals as of 08:49, 22 November 2026 (UTC)

Callum David Hendry (born 8 December 1997) is a professional footballer who plays as a forward for Scottish Premiership club Motherwell.

Born in England, he is the son of former Scotland international defender Colin Hendry, and began his career with his father's former club Blackburn Rovers, during which time he spent time on loan at non-league Clitheroe. After being released by Blackburn in 2017 without making an appearance, Hendry then moved to Scotland, signing for St Johnstone, and spent time on loan at Brechin City, Aberdeen, and Kilmarnock. After five years with St Johnstone, he returned to England to sign for Salford City. After two years, he moved to Milton Keynes Dons. Hendry moved back to Scotland in August 2025, when he signed for Motherwell.

== Early life ==
The son of former Scottish international footballer Colin Hendry, Hendry was born in Lytham St Annes, whilst his father was playing for Blackburn Rovers. His mother Denise died in July 2009 at Salford Royal Hospital, having contracted meningitis due to long-standing complications from a cosmetic surgery operation in 2002. His father declared bankruptcy the following year due to gambling debts, and was forced to sell the childhood home in Lytham St Annes. Hendry has two older siblings, Rheagan and Kyle, and a younger sister, Niamh.

He has said despite being born in England, he has no interest in representing them.

== Career ==
=== Early career: Blackburn Rovers, Clitheroe loan, injuries ===
When I was young and I had injury troubles and wasn't able to play I did at times wonder if it was worth it. I'd get down but he always said that once I got fit and started playing regularly, I'd see the happiness football would give me. He was right. He was the biggest influence and always tried to keep my mind-set positive.

— Hendry discussing advice given to him by his father Colin

With his father formerly playing for the club, Hendry joined the youth system at Blackburn Rovers. He progressed through the club's academy, but took a year off from football at the age of 12 following the death of his mother. He was sent out on loan to Northern Premier League Division One North team Clitheroe in September 2015. Hendry was offered to the club by Blackburn's academy manager Eric Kinder in order to "test Callum as a footballer in the men's game".

He made his debut for The Blues in a 3–1 victory over Kendal Town, scoring twice. His loan spell was extended for a further month on 10 October but, having scored six times for the club during his loan spell, Hendry suffered ruptured ligaments in his knee during a 2–0 victory over Mossley, and was ruled out for over six months. He had previously suffered a similar injury at the age of 15. After returning to Blackburn, Hendry was released by the club at the end of the 2016–17 season. He later praised his father for his influence in keeping him in football after his release from Blackburn and through his injury issues.

=== St Johnstone ===
==== 2017–2020: professional debut, Brechin City loan ====
Following his release, Hendry joined Scottish Premiership club St Johnstone on a one-year contract, after being recommended to assistant manager Callum Davidson by former teammate Brian O'Neil; he had been training with the team prior to his release, and it was intended for him to be used as an over-age player in the Under-20 team, but "exceeded expectations" upon his arrival. He made his début for the club as a substitute in place of Steven MacLean during a 4–1 victory over Motherwell on 12 August 2017. His first goal for the club came on 18 August 2018, scoring in a 4–2 win in the second round of the League Cup against Queen of the South.

He moved on loan to Brechin City in August 2018. Though he only scored one goal in his time at the League One club, manager Darren Dods was full of praise when reflecting on the loan in 2020, saying that he "could see the talent" of Hendry and that he had the right attitude and mentality to succeed. After returning to St Johnstone, he scored his first league goal on 3 April 2019 in a 2–0 win against Dundee, his first start of the 2018–19 season, and only his second start for the club.

In January 2020 he signed a new contract with St Johnstone, keeping him at the club until 2022. Hendry scored nine goals in the 2019–20 season, directly adding 13 points to St Johnstone's points tally in the league, the last of which came on 7 March against Livingston, and was the club's last without fans in attendance at McDiarmid Park until July 2021 due to the COVID-19 pandemic in the United Kingdom.

==== 2020–2022: out of favour, Aberdeen and Kilmarnock loans, departure ====
Having fallen behind fellow strikers Chris Kane, Guy Melamed, and Stevie May in the pecking order, Hendry was allowed to depart on loan to Aberdeen on 1 February 2021, brought in by manager Derek McInnes as a late deadline day replacement for the outgoing Sam Cosgrove. He impressed on his début despite a 2–0 defeat to Livingston. Hendry scored his first goal for the club on 21 February after coming on as a first-half substitute for the injured Fraser Hornby; it was Aberdeen's first goal in 574 minutes of football. He was also the scorer of Aberdeen's next goal, an 84th winner in the third round of the Scottish Cup against Dumbarton on 3 April. He left Aberdeen at the conclusion of his loan, scoring four goals in 14 appearances. While away from Saints, he missed out on their successes in the Scottish Cup Final and the Scottish League Cup Final.

At the beginning of the 2021–22 season, Hendry failed to score in eight appearances, but made his European début in the UEFA Europa League third qualifying round defeat against Turkish club Galatasaray, an occasion he described as "surreal". On 29 September he moved on loan to Kilmarnock. Having scored five goals in 13 appearances for the Ayrshire-based side, including a goal on his début against Raith Rovers, With his parent club bottom of the table, Hendry was recalled by St Johnstone in January 2022. Hendry credited manager Tommy Wright for helping rediscover his form and confidence while at Killie.

Upon his return to Saints, he scored the opening goal in a 2–1 win against Livingston as St Johnstone ended a 12 game winless run. On 19 March, Hendry scored both goals to help St Johnstone come from a goal down to win 2–1 against Motherwell, with the winning goal coming in stoppage time, moving the team four points clear of Dundee at the bottom of the table. In an interview with newspaper The Times, Hendry described the goal as "what you dream of as a little kid". On 2 April, he scored the only goal in a 1–0 win against Livingston, his seventh goal in 11 games since his return helping Saints move to within six points of 10th placed St Mirren.

His run of form coincided with the final few months of his contract, though he said he was focused on helping St Johnstone survive and scoring; "that is what matters to me. The contract is the last thing on my mind right now". On 11 May, Hendry scored the only goal in a 1–0 win against Aberdeen, securing St Johnstone's place in the promotion-relegation play-offs and condemning Dundee to automatic relegation to the Scottish Championship. He scored St Johnstone's third goal of a 4–0 win in the second leg of the play-off with a "beautiful chip", surviving relegation 6–2 on aggregate against Championship team Inverness Caledonian Thistle. Hendry confirmed his departure from McDiarmid Park on 17 June upon the expiration of his contract, and the goals scored in his final few months ensured he left as a fans' favourite, his name sung to the tune of Lady Gaga's song Paparazzi by Saints supporters.

=== Salford City ===
On 17 June 2022, Hendry agreed to join EFL League Two club Salford City on a two-year deal following his departure from St Johnstone on 1 July. Neil Wood, his new manager at Salford, described his acquisition as a "great addition to our squad, young and hungry to achieve success". He was awarded the EFL League Two Player of the Month award for March 2023 having scored four goals and assisted a further two in Salford's play-off push.

On 19 August 2023, Hendry scored a hat-trick in a 4–3 victory over Tranmere Rovers, the first player to achieve such a feat in the league that season. At the end of the season, Hendry signed a new one-year contract.

=== Milton Keynes Dons ===
On 12 July 2024, Hendry joined League Two club Milton Keynes Dons. He made his debut for the club on 10 August 2024 in a 2–1 home defeat to Bradford City. Hendry scored his first goal for the club on 24 August 2024 in a 3–0 home win over Carlisle United.

=== Motherwell ===
Hendry transferred to Motherwell in August 2025 for an undisclosed transfer fee, signing a two-year contract.

He suffered an injury in December 2025, and in April 2026 underwent double hernia injury.

== Career statistics ==
As of match played 21 November 2026

Appearances and goals by club, season and competition
Club	Season	League			National Cup		League Cup		Other		Total	
Club	Season	Division	Apps	Goals	Apps	Goals	Apps	Goals	Apps	Goals	Apps	Goals
St Johnstone Under-21s (Note: Matches in the Scottish Challenge Cup, in which teams from the SPFL Development League / SPFL Reserve League compete against senior clubs.)	2017–18	SPFL Development League	—						1	0	1	0
St Johnstone Under-21s	2018–19	SPFL Reserve League	—						1	2	1	2
St Johnstone Under-21s	Total		0	0	0	0	0	0	2	2	2	2
St Johnstone	2017–18	Scottish Premiership	5	0	0	0	0	0	—		5	0
St Johnstone	2018–19	Scottish Premiership	12	2	0	0	2	1	—		14	3
St Johnstone	2019–20	Scottish Premiership	20	7	3	1	4	1	—		27	9
St Johnstone	2020–21	Scottish Premiership	16	0	0	0	6	2	—		22	2
St Johnstone	2021–22	Scottish Premiership	19	8	0	0	2	0	5 (Note: two appearances in the UEFA Europa League; one appearance in the UEFA Conference League; and two appearances and one goal in the play-offs)	1	26	9
St Johnstone	Total		72	17	3	1	14	4	5	1	94	23
Brechin City (loan)	2018–19	Scottish League One	12	1	0	0	0	0	0	0	12	1
Aberdeen (loan)	2020–21	Scottish Premiership	12	2	3	1	0	0	—		15	3
Kilmarnock (loan)	2021–22	Scottish Championship	13	4	0	0	0	0	2	1	15	5
Salford City	2022–23	League Two	39	12	2	0	1	0	7	2	49	14
Salford City	2023–24	League Two	27	9	0	0	2	0	1	0	30	9
Salford City	Total		66	21	2	0	3	0	8	2	79	23
Milton Keynes Dons	2024–25	League Two	29	3	1	0	1	0	1	1	32	4
Motherwell	2025–26	Scottish Premiership	21	0	0	0	1	1	—		22	1
Motherwell	2026–27	Scottish Premiership	3	0	0	0	0	0	—		3	0
Motherwell	Total		24	0	0	0	1	1	0	0	25	1
Career total			228	47	9	2	19	5	18	7	274	62

== Honours ==
Individual

- EFL League Two Player of the Month: March 2023
