= 2021 Scottish League Cup final (February) =

Football game

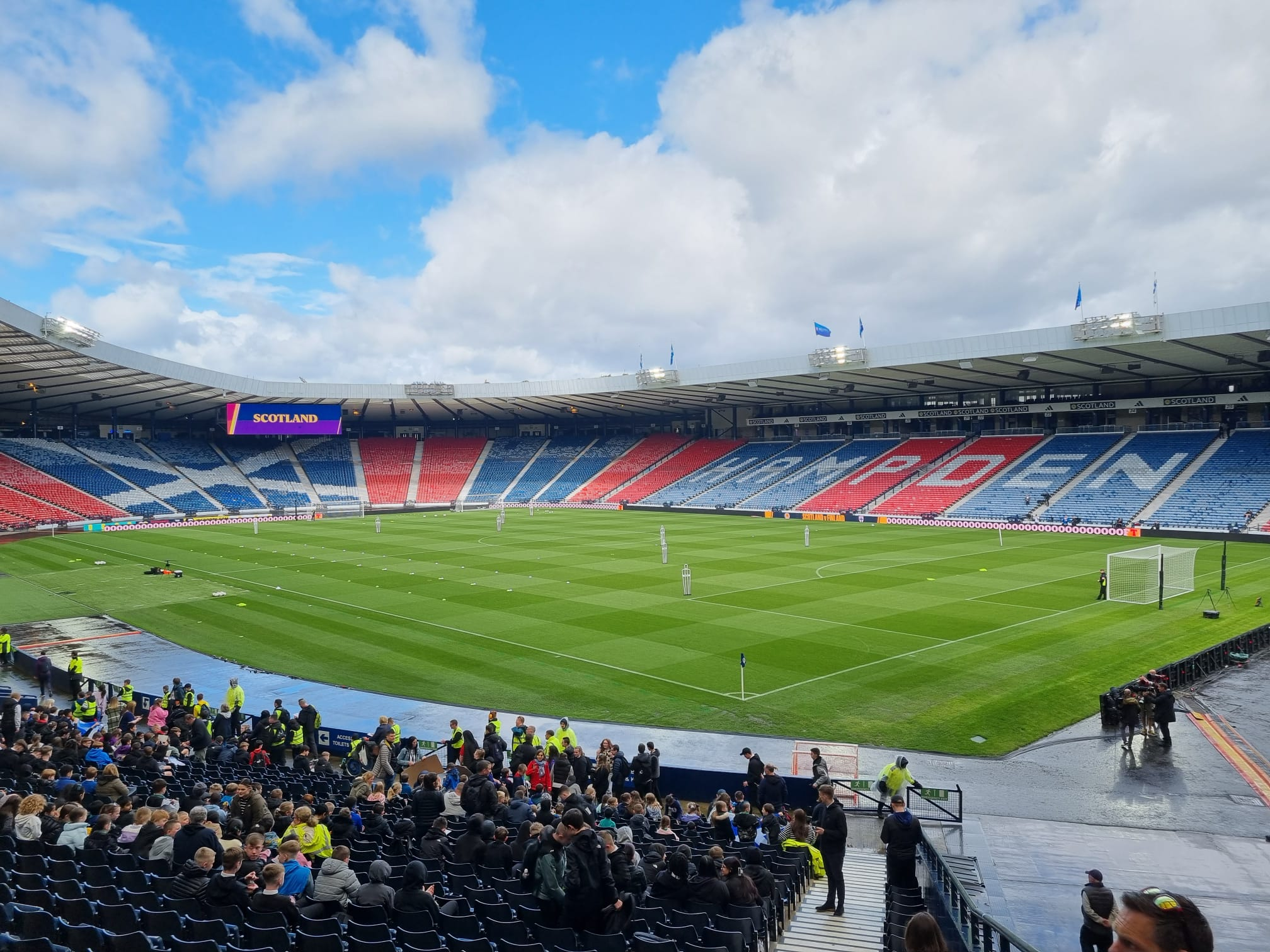
- Hampden Park was the venue for the match
- Event: 2020–21 Scottish League Cup
St Johnstone	Livingston
1	0
- Date: 28 February 2021
- Venue: Hampden Park, Glasgow
- Man of the Match: Shaun Rooney
- Referee: Don Robertson

The 2020–21 Scottish League Cup final was an association football match that took place at Hampden Park, Glasgow on 28 February 2021. It was the final match of the 2020–21 Scottish League Cup, the 75th season of the Scottish League Cup (known as the Betfred Cup for sponsorship reasons), a competition for the 42 teams in the Scottish Professional Football League (SPFL).

Originally due to take place in December 2020, the effect of the COVID-19 pandemic on scheduling meant that the match was pushed back to February 2021 and played behind closed doors.

Winners St Johnstone are the only club to have claimed the trophy having qualified from the early-season group stage since its introduction in 2016–17, while Livingston are one of just two beaten finalists to have come through the groups. Unusually in the 21st century, all of St Johnstone's starting XI (and their used substitute) were born in Scotland, although two players featured for other countries at international level.

== Route to the final ==
=== St Johnstone ===
Round	Opposition	Score
Group stage	Kelty Hearts	2–1 (a)
Group stage	Brechin City	7–0 (h)
Group stage	Dundee United	0–0 (h)
Group stage	Peterhead	3–1 (a)
Second round	Motherwell	2–1 (a)
Quarter-final	Dunfermline Athletic	1–1 (a) (a.e.t.)
Semi-final	Hibernian	3–0 (n)

St Johnstone won Group C to qualify for the second round, winning 10 points from a possible 12. They won 2–1 at Lowland League side Kelty Hearts, 7–0 against League Two club Brechin City and 3–1 at League One team Peterhead. In their other match, Saints drew 0–0 with fellow Premiership club Dundee United, but lost the penalty shootout.

Saints were unseeded for the second round draw and were drawn to face Motherwell at Fir Park on 28 November. Motherwell scored first through Tony Watt, but late goals from Callum Hendry and David Wotherspoon turned the tie around and sent Saints into the quarter-finals.

Saints were again drawn away for the quarter-final, against Championship club Dunfermline Athletic. After a goalless draw in normal time, Shaun Rooney scored the opening goal in the first period of extra time. Dunfermline equalised to force a penalty shootout, which Saints won 4–3.

Hibernian provided the opposition in the semi-final, played at Hampden Park on 23 January. Hibs started strongly but goals from Jason Kerr Shaun Rooney and Craig Conway saw Saints run out comfortable 3–0 winners.

=== Livingston ===
Round	Opposition	Score
Group stage	Edinburgh City	5–1 (a)
Group stage	Alloa Athletic	2–1 (h)
Group stage	Stenhousemuir	4–0 (a)
Group stage	Airdrieonians	4–1 (h)
Second round	Ayr United	4–0 (h)
Quarter-final	Ross County	2–0 (h)
Semi-final	St Mirren	1–0 (n)

Livingston won Group H to qualify for the second round, winning the maximum 12 points en route. They won easily in away games against League Two clubs Edinburgh City and Stenhousemuir, 2–1 at home against Championship side Alloa Athletic, and 4–1 against League One team Airdrieonians.

Livingston were seeded for the second round draw and were drawn to face Championship club Ayr United at home on 28 November. Despite their progress in the League Cup, Livingston had been struggling in the Premiership and manager Gary Holt left the club before the second round tie was played. David Martindale took charge of the team for the first time in the match with Ayr, which Livingston won easily after scoring three early goals through an own goal and two efforts by Jack Fitzwater.

Martindale was still in interim charge for the quarter-final, in which Livi were again drawn at home. They were paired with Ross County, who had knocked out cup holders Celtic in the previous round. Two early goals gave Livi a 2–0 victory.

St Mirren provided the opposition in the semi-final, played at Hampden Park on 24 January. Martindale had been appointed manager on a permanent basis after the quarter-final, and his unbeaten start as a manager continued as an early Scott Robinson goal was enough to give Livingston a 1–0 win. Two days after the semi-final, a Scottish Football Association hearing approved Martindale as a "fit and proper person" to hold a management position. He had previously been imprisoned for involvement with organised crime.

== Match ==
=== Summary ===
In the 32nd minute Craig Conway hit an out swinging corner from the right which Shaun Rooney headed down to the right corner from seven yards out, Livingston goalkeeper Robby McCrorie got a hand to the ball to push it against the post and into the net.

=== Details ===
28 February 2021
14:00

St Johnstone	1–0	Livingston
Rooney 32'

Hampden Park, Glasgow
Referee: Don Robertson

St Johnstone	Livingston

GK	1	(Scotland) Zander Clark
CB	5	(Scotland) Jason Kerr (c)
CB	6	(Scotland) Liam Gordon (yellow card) 82'
CB	4	(Scotland) Jamie McCart
RM	19	(Scotland) Shaun Rooney
CM	18	(Northern Ireland) Ali McCann
CM	26	(Scotland) Liam Craig
LM	24	(Scotland) Callum Booth
AM	7	(Scotland) Craig Conway	(substituted off) 77'
AM	10	(Canada) David Wotherspoon
FW	9	(Scotland) Chris Kane (yellow card) 89'
Substitutes:
DF	2	(England) James Brown
DF	3	(England) Scott Tanser
FW	11	(Scotland) Michael O'Halloran
GK	12	(England) Elliot Parish
MF	13	(Scotland) Craig Bryson
FW	14	(Scotland) Stevie May	(substituted on) 77'
MF	15	(Scotland) Charlie Gilmour
FW	17	(Israel) Guy Melamed
Manager:
(Scotland) Callum Davidson

GK	1	(Scotland) Robby McCrorie
RB	2	(Scotland) Nicky Devlin
CB	25	(Nigeria) Efe Ambrose
CB	27	(England) Jon Guthrie
LB	12	(France) Julien Serrano (yellow card) 90'
CM	33	(Togo) Steve Lawson	(substituted off) 60'
CM	18	(Scotland) Jason Holt	(substituted off) 71'
AM	14	(Scotland) Josh Mullin	(substituted off) 65'
AM	8	(Scotland) Scott Pittman	(substituted off) 65'
AM	6	(England) Marvin Bartley (c) (yellow card) 80'
FW	17	(Scotland) Scott Robinson
Substitutes:
DF	5	(England) Jack Fitzwater
FW	9	(England) Jay Emmanuel-Thomas	(substituted on) 71'
MF	10	(Scotland) Craig Sibbald	(substituted on) 60'
MF	11	(Scotland) Alan Forrest	(substituted on) 65'
FW	20	(Scotland) Gavin Reilly	(substituted on) 65'
DF	21	(Scotland) Jack McMillan
DF	29	(Scotland) Aaron Taylor-Sinclair
GK	32	(Poland) Max Stryjek
FW	37	(Republic of Ireland) Jaze Kabia
Manager:
(Scotland) David Martindale

Match officials

- Referee: Don Robertson

Match rules

- 90 minutes
- 30 minutes of extra-time if necessary
- Penalty shoot-out if scores still level
- Maximum of five substitutions (1 additional in any extra-time)
