= 2020–21 St Johnstone F.C. season =

St Johnstone
2020–21 season
- Chairman: Steve Brown
- Manager: Callum Davidson
- Stadium: McDiarmid Park
- Scottish Premiership: 5th
- Scottish Cup: Winners
- League Cup: Winners
- Top goalscorer: League: Guy Melamed (5); All: Stevie May (9)
Home colours	Away colours	Cup finals colours

The 2020–21 St Johnstone F.C. season was the club's eighth season in the Scottish Premiership and their eleventh consecutive season in the top flight of Scottish football. St Johnstone also competed in the Scottish Cup and the League Cup, winning both competitions. St Johnstone became only the fourth Scottish team, and only the second outwith the Old Firm, to win a Scottish cup double.

== Season summary ==
After the resignation of Tommy Wright, Alec Cleland took over as interim manager. After sixteen years at the club Steven Anderson left before the season began along with Danny Swanson, Ross Callachan and David McMillan. Former player and assistant manager Callum Davidson was appointed manager. Former striker Steven MacLean retired to become a coach alongside Cleland who returns to his former role. The Saints dropped to the bottom of the table after four games without a goal, but after a 5–3 away win at Hamilton they moved off it.

The Saints reached the final of the League Cup with a 3–0 win against Hibernian. On 28 February 2021, St Johnstone defeated Livingston in the final thanks to a single goal from Shaun Rooney. In doing so, the club won their first League Cup title, their second ever major honour, and ended Celtic's dominating run of having won the last 12 major honours at stake in Scotland.

On 22 May 2021, St Johnstone won the Scottish Cup, defeating Hibs by a score of 1–0 in the final, with Shaun Rooney again netting the winning goal. With the victory, St Johnstone became just the fourth club in Scottish history to win the cup double after Aberdeen, Celtic, and Rangers.

== Results ==
Win Draw Loss Postponed

=== Pre-season ===
21 July 2020 Friendly	Aberdeen	1–2	St Johnstone	Aberdeen
	Anderson		Tanser 75' (pen.), 80'	Stadium: Pittodrie Stadium; Attendance: 0

25 July 2020 Friendly	St Mirren	Cancelled	St Johnstone	Paisley
				Stadium: St Mirren Park
Note: Match cancelled after positive COVID-19 tests

=== Scottish Premiership ===
1 August 2020 1	Dundee United	1–1	St Johnstone	Tannadice Park
15:00 BST	Clark 6' (pen.)	Report	Craig 55'	Referee: Kevin Clancy

12 August 2020 3	Rangers	3–0	St Johnstone	Ibrox Stadium
19:45 BST	Barisic 21'; Kent 45+2'; Aribo 49'	Report		Referee: Euan Anderson

15 August 2020 4	Kilmarnock	1–2	St Johnstone	Rugby Park
15:00 BST	Tshibola 61'; Millen (red card) 63'	Report	Wotherspoon 85'; O'Halloran 90+4'	Referee: Andrew Dallas

20 August 2020 2	St Johnstone	0–1	Aberdeen	McDiarmid Park
19:30 BST	Craig (yellow card) 88'	Report	Ferguson (yellow card) 53'; Hedges 82', (yellow card) 88'; McCrorie (yellow card) 89'	Referee: Willie Collum
Note: Rearranged after postponement, live on Sky Sports.

23 August 2020 5	St Johnstone	0–1	Hibernian	McDiarmid Park
16:30 BST	Craig (red card) 90+4'	Report	Mallan 90+1' (pen.)	Referee: John Beaton
Note: Live on Sky Sports, Liam Craig was sent off after the final whistle

29 August 2020 6	St Johnstone	1–0	St Mirren	McDiarmid Park
15:00 BST	May 72'	Report		Referee: Kevin Clancy

12 September 2020 7	Motherwell	1–0	St Johnstone	Fir Park
15:00 BST	Campbell 4', (yellow card) 87'; O'Hara (yellow card) 36'; Watt (yellow card) 48'; Carson (yellow card) 69'	Report		Referee: Euan Anderson

19 September 2020 8	St Johnstone	0–1	Ross County	McDiarmid Park
15:00 BST			Vigurs 42'	Referee: David Munro

26 September 2020 9	Livingston	2–0	St Johnstone	Tony Macaroni Arena
15:00 BST	Tiffoney 34'; Forrest 35'	Report		Referee: Craig Napier

4 October 2020 10	St Johnstone	0–2	Celtic	McDiarmid Park
12:00 BST		Report	Griffiths 90'; Klimala 90+3'	Referee: Nick Walsh

17 October 2020 11	Hamilton Academical	3–5	St Johnstone	New Douglas Park
15:00 BST	Hughes 40', 79'; Ogkmpoe 44'	Report	May 1', 33'; Wotherspoon 14'; Conway 69', 82'	Referee: Alan Muir

24 October 2020 12	St Johnstone	0–0	Dundee United	McDiarmid Park
15:00		Report		Attendance: 0 Referee: Andrew Dallas

6 November 2020 14	St Johnstone	1–0	Kilmarnock	McDiarmid Park
19:45	McNamara 70'	Report		Attendance: 0 Referee: Gavin Duncan

21 November 2020 15	St Johnstone	1–1	Motherwell	McDiarmid Park
15:00	May 34' (pen.)	Report	O'Hara 17'	Attendance: 0 Referee: Steven Kirkland

24 November 2020 13	Hibernian	2–2	St Johnstone	McDiarmid Park
19:45	McGinn 36', 83'	Report	McCann 35'; Wotherspoon 76'	Attendance: 0 Referee: Kevin Clancy

6 December 2020 16	Celtic	1–1	St Johnstone	Celtic Park
15:00	Elyounoussi 83'	Report	Kane 79'	Attendance: 0

12 December 2020 17	St Johnstone	1–2	Livingston	McDiarmid Park
15:00	Kane 54'	Report	Guthrie 48'; Robinson 65'	Attendance: 0

19 December 2020 18	St Mirren	3–2	St Johnstone	St Mirren Park
15:00	Erhahon 38'; Erwin 82'; Obika 87'	Report	May 22' (pen.); Tanser 44'; Kerr (red card) 45'	Attendance: 0 Referee: Steven McLean

23 December 2020 19	St Johnstone	0–3	Rangers	McDiarmid Park
18:00	O'Halloran (red card) 83'	Report	Roofe 24'; Kamara 31'; Hagi 47'	Attendance: 0

26 December 2020 20	Aberdeen	2–1	St Johnstone	Pittodrie
15:00	Gosgrove 45+2' (pen.); Taylor 54'	Report	Gordon 38'; Hendry (red card) 90'	Attendance: 0 Referee: Alan Muir

30 December 2020 21	St Johnstone	0–0	Hamilton Academical	McDiarmid Park
15:00		Report		Attendance: 0 Referee: David Munro

2 January 2021 22	Ross County	1–1	St Johnstone	Victoria Park
15:00	Draper 21'	Report	Conway 26' (pen.)	Attendance: 0 Referee: Willie Collum

12 January 2021 23	Dundee United	2–2	St Johnstone	Tannadice Park
18:00	Appéré 9'; Shankland 53'	Report	Melamed 16'; Kane 38'	Attendance: 0 Referee: Colin Steven

16 January 2021 24	St Johnstone	1–0	St Mirren	McDiarmid Park
15:00	Kane 46'	Report	MacPherson (red card) 55'	Attendance: 0 Referee: Steven McLean

27 January 2021 26	St Johnstone	0–0	Aberdeen	McDiarmid Park
18:00 GMT	Gordon (yellow card) 81'	Report	Considine (yellow card) 24'	Referee: Don Robertson

30 January 2021 25	Kilmarnock	2–3	St Johnstone	Rugby Park
15:00	Burke 5'; Tshibola 32'	Report	Melamed 53'; Davidson 68'; McCann 72'	Attendance: 0 Referee: Greg Aitken

3 February 2021 27	Rangers	1–0	St Johnstone	Ibrox Stadium
19:45	Roofe (yellow card) 21'; Hagi 52'	Report	Kane (yellow card) 85'	Referee: David Munro

6 February 2021 28	Livingston	1–2	St Johnstone	Tony Macaroni Arena
15:00 GMT	Pittman 83'	Report	Tanser 45+2'; Rooney 51'	Referee: Euan Anderson

14 February 2021 29	St Johnstone	1–2	Celtic	McDiarmid Park
12:00	Rooney 50'	Report	Édouard 60', 62'	Attendance: 0 Referee: Steven McLean

20 February 2021 30	Motherwell	0–3	St Johnstone	Fir Park
15:00 GMT		Report	Melamed 19', 50' (pen.); Kerr 45'	Attendance: 0 Referee: John Beaton

3 March 2021 31	Hamilton Academical	1–1	St Johnstone	New Douglas Park
18:00 GMT	Callachan 36'	Report	Melamed 87'	Attendance: 0 Referee: Grant Irvine

6 March 2021 32	St Johnstone	1–0	Hibernian	McDiarmid Park
15:00	Craig 16'	Report		Attendance: 0 Referee: David Dickinson

20 March 2021 33	St Johnstone	1–0	Ross County	McDiarmid Park
15:00	Middleton 86'	Report		Attendance: 0 Referee: Craig Napier

10 April 2021 34	St Johnstone	0–1	Aberdeen	McDiarmid Park
15:00		Report	Hayes 52'	Attendance: 0 Referee: John Beaton

21 April 2021 35	St Johnstone	1–1	Rangers	McDiarmid Park
19:45	Craig 90+4' (pen.)	Report	Wright 55'	Attendance: 0 Referee: Euan Anderson

1 May 2021 36	Hibernian	0–1	St Johnstone	Easter Road
15:00 GMT		Report	Middleton 22'	Attendance: 0 Referee: Greg Aitken

12 May 2021 37	Celtic	4–0	St Johnstone	Celtic Park
15:00 GMT	Turnbull 23'; Édouard 24'; Ajer 79'; Dembélé 85'	Report		Attendance: 0 Referee: Bobby Madden

15 May 2021 38	St Johnstone	0–0	Livingston	McDiarmid Park
12:30		Report		Attendance: 0 Referee: Craig Napier

=== Scottish League Cup ===
==== Group stage ====
6 October 2020	Kelty Hearts	1–2	St Johnstone	New Central Park
19:45	Tidser 71'	Report	Kerr 45+2'; Kane 60'	Attendance: 0 Referee: Alan Newlands

10 October 2020	St Johnstone	7–0	Brechin City	McDiarmid Park
15:00	May 3', 58', 62'; Wotherspoon 25', 56'; Hendry 88' (pen.); Davidson 90'			Attendance: 0 Referee: Craig Napier

10 November 2020	St Johnstone	0–0 (3–4 p)	Dundee United	McDiarmid Park
19:45		Report		Attendance: 0

14 November 2020	Peterhead	1–3	St Johnstone	Balmoor Stadium
15:00	Rooney 78' (o.g.)	Report	May 49' (pen.), 60' (pen.); Kane 77'	Attendance: 0

==== Knockout round ====
28 November 2020 Second round	Motherwell	1–2	St Johnstone	Fir Park
15:00	Watt 61'	Report	Hendry 68'; Wotherspoon 77'	Attendance: 0 Referee: Alan Muir

15 December 2020 Quarter-final	Dunfermline Athletic	1–1 (3–4 p)	St Johnstone	East End Park
19:45	Wilson 113'	Report	Rooney 94'	Attendance: 0 Referee: Don Robertson

23 January 2021 Semi-final	St Johnstone	3–0	Hibernian	Hampden Park
17:30	Kerr 35'; Rooney 49'; Conway 63'	Report		Attendance: 0

28 February 2021 Final	Livingston	0–1	St Johnstone	Hampden Park
14:00		Report	Rooney 32'	Attendance: 0 Referee: Don Robertson

=== Scottish Cup ===
3 April 2021 Third round	Dundee	0–1	St Johnstone	Dens Park
15:00		Report	Melamed 20'	Attendance: 0 Referee: Craig Napier

17 April 2021 Fourth round	St Johnstone	2–0	Clyde	McDiarmid Park
12:00	Melamed 6'; O'Halloran 21'	Report		Attendance: 0 Referee: Steven Kirkland

25 April 2021 Quarter-final	Rangers	1–1 (a.e.t.) (2–4 p)	St Johnstone	Glasgow
18:30	Morelos (yellow card) 36'; Aribo (yellow card) 71'; Tavernier 117'	Report	Kerr (yellow card) 36'; Wotherspoon (yellow card) 45+1'; McCann (yellow card) 55'; Kane (yellow card) 90+2', (goal) 120+2'	Stadium: Ibrox Stadium; Attendance: N/A; Referee: Alan Muir
	Penalties
	Tavernier (penalty missed); Barišić (penalty scored); Defoe (penalty scored); Roofe (penalty missed)		(penalty scored) Craig; (penalty scored) Booth; (penalty scored) Kerr; (penalty scored) McCann

9 May 2021 Semi-final	St Mirren	1–2	St Johnstone	Glasgow
14:15	McCarthy 86'	Report	Kane 72'; Middleton 74'	Stadium: Hampden Park; Attendance: 0 Referee: Willie Collum

22 May 2021 Final	St Johnstone	1–0	Hibernian	Glasgow
14:00	Rooney 32'	Report		Stadium: Hampden Park; Attendance: 0 Referee: Nick Walsh

== Squad statistics ==
=== Appearances ===
As of 22 May 2021

No.	Pos	Player	Premiership		League Cup		Scottish Cup		Total	
No.	Pos	Player	Apps	Goals	Apps	Goals	Apps	Goals	Apps	Goals
1	GK	(Scotland) Zander Clark	27	0	7	0	4	0	38	0
2	DF	(England) James Brown	4+1	0	0	0	1+1	0	7	0
3	DF	(England) Scott Tanser	21+6	1	4	0	2	0	33	1
4	DF	(Scotland) Jamie McCart	36	0	6+1	0	5	0	48	0
5	DF	(Scotland) Jason Kerr (c)	30	1	6	1	5	0	41	2
6	DF	(Scotland) Liam Gordon	35+1	1	7	0	5	0	48	1
7	MF	(Scotland) Craig Conway	19+8	3	5+2	0	0	0	34	3
8	MF	(Scotland) Murray Davidson	14+7	1	4+2	1	0+1	0	28	2
9	FW	(Scotland) Chris Kane	17+10	4	5+3	2	2+2	2	39	8
10	MF	(Canada) David Wotherspoon	28+9	3	7+1	3	5	0	50	6
11	FW	(Scotland) Michael O'Halloran	13+12	1	2+1	0	1+3	1	32	2
12	GK	(England) Elliot Parish	9	0	1	0	1	0	11	0
13	MF	(Scotland) Craig Bryson	12+8	0	2+2	0	2+2	0	28	0
14	FW	(Scotland) Stevie May	17+16	4	3+5	5	3	0	44	9
15	MF	(Scotland) Charlie Gilmour	1+1	0	0	0	0+1	0	3	0
16	MF	(Scotland) Glenn Middleton	3+6	2	0	0	1+3	1	13	3
17	FW	(Israel) Guy Melamed	11+7	5	1	0	4	2	23	7
18	MF	(Scotland) Ali McCann	31+2	2	4	0	4+1	0	42	2
19	DF	(Scotland) Shaun Rooney	20+8	2	8	2	4	1	40	5
20	FW	(Scotland) John Robertson	0+5	0	0	0	0	0	5	0
24	DF	(Scotland) Callum Booth	15+3	0	7	0	3+1	0	29	0
25	GK	(Czech Republic) Zdeněk Zlámal	2	0	0	0	0	0	2	0
26	MF	(Scotland) Liam Craig	17+5	2	7	0	3	0	32	2
40	DF	(Scotland) Samuel Denham	0	0	0	0	0	0	0	0
46	FW	(Scotland) Alexander Ferguson	0+1	0	0+1	0	0	0	2	0
Player who left the club during the season
2	DF	(Scotland) Wallace Duffy	0	0	0	0	0	0	0	0
15	DF	(Republic of Ireland) Danny McNamara	22	1	0	0	0	0	22	1
16	FW	(England) Isaac Olaofe	0+2	0	0	0	0	0	2	0
22	FW	(England) Callum Hendry	8+8	0	3+3	2	0	0	22	2
23	MF	(Scotland) Cammy Ballantyne	0	0	0	0	0	0	0	0
45	GK	(Scotland) Ross Sinclair	0	0	0	0	0	0	0	0

== Team statistics ==
=== League table ===
Pos	Team	Pld	W	D	L	GF	GA	GD	Pts	Qualification or relegation (Note: Teams play each other three times (33 matches), before the league is split into two groups (the top six and the bottom six).)
3	Hibernian	38	18	9	11	48	35	+13	63	Qualification for the Europa Conference League second qualifying round
4	Aberdeen	38	15	11	12	36	38	−2	56	Qualification for the Europa Conference League second qualifying round
5	St Johnstone	38	11	12	15	36	46	−10	45	Qualification for the Europa League third qualifying round (Note: St Johnstone qualified as the 2020–21 Scottish Cup winners.)
6	Livingston	38	12	9	17	42	54	−12	45	
7	St Mirren	38	11	12	15	37	45	−8	45	

Rules for classification: 1) Points; 2) Goal difference; 3) Goals scored; 4) Head-to-head points; 5) Head-to-Head goal difference; 6) Play-off (only if deciding champion, UEFA competitions qualification, second stage group allocation or relegation).

==== League Cup table ====
Pos	Team	Pld	W	PW	PL	L	GF	GA	GD	Pts	Qualification	STJ	DUN	PET	KEL	BRE
1	St Johnstone	4	3	0	1	0	12	2	+10	10	Qualification for the Second round	—	0–0p	—	—	7–0
2	Dundee United	4	2	1	0	1	7	3	+4	8		—	—	0–1	1–0	—
3	Peterhead	4	2	1	0	1	6	5	+1	8		1–3	—	—	—	3–1
4	Kelty Hearts	4	1	0	1	2	4	4	0	4		1–2	—	1–1p	—	—
5	Brechin City	4	0	0	0	4	3	18	−15	0		—	2–6	—	0–2	—

Rules for classification: 1) points, 2) goal difference, 3) goals scored, 4) away goals scored, 5) matches won, 6) away matches won, 7) drawing of lots.

== Transfers ==
=== Players in ===
Date	Player	From	Fee
1 June 2020	(Scotland) Shaun Rooney	(Scotland) Inverness Caledonian Thistle	Free
14 July 2020	(Republic of Ireland) Danny McNamara	(England) Millwall	Loan
14 July 2020	(England) Isaac Olaofe	(England) Millwall	Loan
31 July 2020	(Scotland) Craig Conway	(England) Salford City	Free
18 September 2020	(Scotland) Craig Bryson	(Scotland) Aberdeen	Free
5 October 2020	(Israel) Guy Melamed	(Israel) Maccabi Netanya	Free
4 January 2021	(England) James Brown	(England) Millwall	Loan
25 January 2021	(Scotland) Glenn Middleton	(Scotland) Rangers	Loan
1 February 2021	(Scotland) Charlie Gilmour	(England) Norwich City	Free
7 May 2021	(Czech Republic) Zdeněk Zlámal	(Scotland) Heart of Midlothian	Loan

=== Players out ===
Date	Player	To	Fee
16 May 2020	(Scotland) Danny Swanson	(Scotland) East Fife	Free
29 June 2020	(Scotland) Ross Callachan	(Scotland) Hamilton Academical	Free
10 July 2020	(England) Drey Wright	(Scotland) Hibernian	Free
11 July 2020	(Scotland) Euan O'Riley	(Scotland) Airdrieonians	Free
14 July 2020	(Scotland) Steven Anderson	(Scotland) Forfar Athletic	Free
27 May 2020	(Republic of Ireland) David McMillan	(Republic of Ireland) Dundalk	Free
30 July 2020	(Scotland) Danny Swanson	(Scotland) East Fife	Free
27 May 2020	(England) Max Johnstone	(England) AFC Fylde	Free
14 September 2020	(Scotland) Cammy Ballantyne	(Scotland) Montrose	Loan
22 September 2020	(Scotland) Olly Hamilton	(Scotland) Cowdenbeath	Loan
25 September 2020	(Scotland) Ross Sinclair	(Scotland) Cowdenbeath	Loan
5 October 2020	(Scotland) Wallace Duffy	(Scotland) Inverness Caledonian Thistle	Free
5 October 2020	(Scotland) John Robertson	(Scotland) Forfar Athletic	Loan
27 May 2020	(Scotland) Shaun Struthers	(Scotland) Jeanfield Swifts	Free
1 February 2021	(Scotland) Callum Hendry	(Scotland) Aberdeen	Loan

== See also ==
- List of St Johnstone F.C. seasons
