= 1992–93 St Johnstone F.C. season =

St Johnstone
1992–93 season
- Manager: Alex Totten (until 14 December 1992); John McClelland (from 14 December 1992)
- Stadium: McDiarmid Park
- Scottish Premier Division: 6th
- Scottish Cup: Quarter-final
- Scottish League Cup: Semi-final
- Highest home attendance: 9,783 vs Celtic, Premier Division, 31 October 1992
- Lowest home attendance: 3,546 vs Falkirk, Premier Division, 16 March 1993
- Average home league attendance: 5,603

During the 1992–93 season, St Johnstone competed in the Scottish Premier Division, in which they finished 6th.

== Scottish Premier Division ==
=== League table ===
Pos	Team	Pld	W	D	L	GF	GA	GD	Pts	Qualification or relegation
4	Dundee United	44	19	9	16	56	49	+7	47	Qualification for the UEFA Cup first round
5	Heart of Midlothian	44	15	14	15	46	51	−5	44	Qualification for the UEFA Cup first round
6	St Johnstone	44	10	20	14	52	66	−14	40	
7	Hibernian	44	12	13	19	54	64	−10	37	
8	Partick Thistle	44	12	12	20	50	71	−21	36	

Source: RSSSF
Rules for classification: 1) points; 2) goal difference; 3) number of goals scored.

=== Matches ===
Win	Draw	Loss

Scottish Premier Division results
Date	Opponent	Venue	Result F–A	Scorers	Attendance
1 August 1992	Rangers	A	0–1		38,036
4 August 1992	Dundee	A	1–1	Curran	5,663
8 August 1992	Partick Thistle	H	1–1	Wright	4,401
15 August 1992	Airdrieonians	H	3–0	Curran, Torfason, Wright	3,708
22 August 1992	Dundee United	A	1–2	Torfason	7,353
29 August 1992	Hibernian	H	1–1	Wright (pen.)	6,017
2 September 1992	Celtic	A	1–3	Wright	21,831
12 September 1992	Falkirk	H	3–2	Arkins, Curran, Treanor	4,361
19 September 1992	Motherwell	A	3–3	Curran, Wright, Moore	4,002
26 September 1992	Aberdeen	H	0–3		7,320
3 October 1992	Heart of Midlothian	A	1–1	Davies	7,738
7 October 1992	Rangers	H	1–5	Arkins	9,532
17 October 1992	Partick Thistle	A	0–1		4,211
24 October 1992	Hibernian	A	1–3	Arkins	5,988
31 October 1992	Celtic	H	0–0		9,783
7 November 1992	Dundee United	H	2–0	Wright, Arkins	5,513
14 November 1992	Airdrieonians	A	2–0	Wright (2)	2,550
24 November 1992	Motherwell	H	2–0	Curran, Maskrey	3,582
28 November 1992	Falkirk	A	2–2	Cherry, Curran	4,565
2 December 1992	Dundee	H	4–4	Davies, Wright (2), Maskrey	5,766
5 December 1992	Aberdeen	A	0–3		11,750
12 December 1992	Heart of Midlothian	H	1–1	Wright	4,362
19 December 1992	Rangers	A	0–2		37,369
26 December 1992	Airdrieonians	H	1–0	Arkins	4,139
2 January 1993	Dundee United	A	2–1	Davies, Wright	10,316
20 January 1993	Heart of Midlothian	A	0–2		5,060
23 January 1993	Hibernian	H	2–0	Deas, Turner	4,206
30 January 1993	Partick Thistle	H	0–0		4,555
3 February 1993	Celtic	A	1–5	Arkins	12,931
13 February 1993	Dundee	A	0–1		4,869
20 February 1993	Aberdeen	H	0–2		6,176
27 February 1993	Motherwell	A	1–1	Redford	4,278
10 March 1993	Rangers	H	1–1	Wright	9,258
13 March 1993	Partick Thistle	A	1–1	Davies	3,534
16 March 1993	Falkirk	H	1–0	Dunne	3,546
20 March 1993	Dundee United	H	1–4	Dunne	4,510
27 March 1993	Airdrieonians	A	1–1	Redford	2,339
6 April 1993	Hibernian	A	2–2	Moore, Buglione	3,526
10 April 1993	Celtic	H	1–1	Moore	8,609
17 April 1993	Falkirk	A	2–2	Curran, McGowne	3,860
24 April 1993	Motherwell	H	0–0		5,544
1 May 1993	Dundee	H	1–1	Wright	4,471
8 May 1993	Aberdeen	A	1–1	Torfason	7,727
15 May 1993	Heart of Midlothian	H	3–1	Torfason (pen.), Curran, Buglione	3,900

== Scottish Cup ==
Win	Draw	Loss

Scottish Cup results
Round	Date	Opponent	Venue	Result F–A	Scorers	Attendance
Third round	9 January 1993	Forfar Athletic	H	6–0	Wright (2), Cherry, Arkins (2), Maskrey	3,970
Fourth round	6 February 1993	Kilmarnock	A	0–0		9,278
Fourth round replay	10 February 1993	Kilmarnock	H	1–0 (a.e.t.)	Davies	7,144
Quarter-final	6 March 1993	Hibernian	A	0–2		10,785

== Scottish League Cup ==
Win	Draw	Loss

Scottish League Cup results
Round	Date	Opponent	Venue	Result F–A	Scorers	Attendance
Second round	11 August 1992	Alloa Athletic	A	3–1	Curran, Wright (2)	1,178
Third round	19 August 1992	Partick Thistle	H	2–2 (a.e.t.) (4–3 p)	Wright, McAuley	4,716
Quarter-final	25 August 1992	Kilmarnock	A	3–1	Torfason, Maskrey, Wright	8,293
Semi-final	22 September 1992	Rangers	N	1–3	Wright (pen.)	30,062
