= St Johnstone F.C. in European football =

Scottish club in European football

St Johnstone in European football
- Club: St Johnstone
- Seasons played: 8
- First entry: 1971–72 UEFA Cup
- Latest entry: 2021–22 UEFA Europa Conference League

Titles
- Europa League: 0 (Best: Third round)
- Conference League: 0 (Best: Play-off round)

St Johnstone Football Club is a Scottish association football club based in the city of Perth. The club first competed in a European competition in 1971–72, qualifying for the UEFA Cup following a third-place finish in the Scottish First Division. The club reached the third round, which remains their best run in a UEFA competition to date.

== History ==
=== 1971–72 UEFA Cup ===
St Johnstone qualified for a UEFA competition for the first time in 1971–72 after a third-place finish in the Scottish First Division the previous season. Their first match was away to Hamburger SV of West Germany at Volksparkstadion which ended in a 2–1 defeat for the club. In the return leg in Perth, St Johnstone triumphed 3–0 winners and knocked out Hamburg 4–2 on aggregate to progress to the second round. They were paired with Hungarian side Vasas SC and won the first leg of the tie 2–0 at home. In Hungary, Vasas won 1–0 on the night but St Johnstone won overall 2–1 on aggregate. In the third round they faced Željezničar from Yugoslavia. St Johnstone again won their home leg, this time by a scoreline of 1–0 but on the away leg they were convincingly defeated by their opponents 5–1 in Sarajevo to exit the tournament 2–5 on aggregate.

Season	Competition	Round	Opponent	Home	Away	Aggregate
1971–72	UEFA Cup	First round	(West Germany) Hamburg	3–0	1–2	4–2
1971–72	UEFA Cup	Second round	(Hungary) Vasas	2–0	0–1	2–1
1971–72	UEFA Cup	Third round	(Socialist Federal Republic of Yugoslavia) Željezničar	1–0	1–5	2–5

=== 1999–2000 UEFA Cup ===
Following a 28-year absence from European football, St Johnstone qualified for the UEFA Cup for the second time in its history after another third-place finish in the top flight of Scottish football. In the qualifying round they faced Finnish club VPS and the clubs played out a 1–1 draw at Hietalahti Stadium in Vaasa in the first leg. In the return leg at McDiarmid Park they won 2–0 to progress 3–1 on aggregate. Their opponents in the first round proper were AS Monaco of France. In the first leg at Stade Louis II in Monaco, St Johnstone were defeated 3–0. The return leg saw a six-goal game ending in a 3–3 draw, which was not enough for the club to progress, losing 3–6 on aggregate.

Season	Competition	Round	Opponent	Home	Away	Aggregate
1999–2000	UEFA Cup	Qualifying round	(Finland) VPS	2–0	1–1	3–1
1999–2000	UEFA Cup	First round	(France) AS Monaco	3–3	0–3	3–6

=== 2012–13 UEFA Europa League ===
St Johnstone again qualified for a UEFA competition in 2012–13 by virtue of league ranking, finishing 6th in the Scottish Premier League. Several circumstances occurred which allowed the club to qualify: Rangers, who finished second in the league, were disqualified from European competition and Heart of Midlothian, who finished fifth, would have benefited from this but had already qualified for Europe after winning the Scottish Cup. The qualification spot was therefore passed down to St Johnstone. The club faced Eskişehirspor of Turkey in the second qualifying round and were defeated 2–0 in the away leg. In the second leg in Perth, St Johnstone managed a 1–1 draw but were eliminated 1–3 on aggregate. The draw in Perth meant that St Johnstone remained undefeated at home in Europe.

Season	Competition	Round	Opponent	Home	Away	Aggregate
2012–13	UEFA Europa League	Second qualifying round	(Turkey) Eskişehirspor	1–1	0–2	1–3

=== 2013–14 UEFA Europa League ===
St Johnstone, for the second season in a row, qualified for the UEFA Europa League in 2012–13 by virtue of league ranking, finishing third in the Scottish Premier League. A Frazer Wright goal in Trondheim, the home city of Rosenborg, gave the Perth club a chance of proceeding to the next round and, despite an early goal by Rosenborg in the home leg at McDiarmid Park, a Stevie May goal in front of 7,850 supporters (almost all behind the home club) was enough for St Johnstone to earn a place in the third qualifying round against FC Minsk of Belarus.

Due to redevelopment work taking place at FC Minsk's stadium, the first leg in the next round took place hundreds of kilometers away from Minsk in the city of Grodno. A goal by Steve MacLean twenty minutes from time secured a 1-0 victory. St Johnstone were then knocked out of the competition on penalty kicks after Minsk levelled the tie with a 1-0 scoreline in the home leg at McDiarmid Park sending the match into extra time which saw no further goals. A crowd of 8500 had turned out but all but a small handful who had travelled with the Minsk official party went home disappointed.

Season	Competition	Round	Opponent	Home	Away	Aggregate
2013–14	UEFA Europa League	Second qualifying round	(Norway) Rosenborg	1–1	1–0	2–1
2013–14	UEFA Europa League	Third qualifying round	(Belarus) Minsk	0–1 (aet)	1–0	1–1 (2–3 p.)

=== 2014–15 UEFA Europa League ===
St Johnstone were drawn to face FC Luzern of Switzerland in the Second Qualifying round. The first leg in Switzerland finished 1-1 with Steven MacLean scoring for the Saints. 8000 home supporters together with 500 followers of FC Luzern watched St Johnstone take a first half lead in the second leg with a penalty scored by Stevie May. A goal from Luzern in the second half took the tie to extra time but no further goals were able to separate the sides meaning a penalty shoot out was required. The Swiss side only missed one penalty but St Johnstone netted all five to send the Perth men through to face Spartak Trnava of Slovakia in the Third Qualifying Round.

Season	Competition	Round	Opponent	Home	Away	Aggregate
2014–15	UEFA Europa League	Second qualifying round	(Switzerland) FC Luzern	1–1	1–1	2–2 (5–4 p.)
2014–15	UEFA Europa League	Third qualifying round	(Slovakia) Spartak Trnava	1–2	1–1	2–3

=== 2015–16 UEFA Europa League ===
Season	Competition	Round	Opponent	Home	Away	Aggregate
2015–16	UEFA Europa League	First qualifying round	(Armenia) Alashkert	2–1	0–1	2–2 (a)

=== 2017–18 UEFA Europa League ===
Season	Competition	Round	Opponent	Home	Away	Aggregate
2017–18	UEFA Europa League	First qualifying round	(Lithuania) Trakai	1–2	0–1	1–3

=== 2021–22 UEFA Europa League ===
St Johnstone qualified for the third qualifying round of the Europa League by winning the 2020-21 Scottish Cup.

Season	Competition	Round	Opponent	Home	Away	Aggregate
2021–22	UEFA Europa League	Third qualifying round	(Turkey) Galatasaray	2–4	1–1	3–5

=== 2021–22 UEFA Europa Conference League ===
Upon losing the 3rd round Europa League tie, St Johnstone dropped down to the Europa Conference League play-off tie.

Season	Competition	Round	Opponent	Home	Away	Aggregate
2021–22	UEFA Europa Conference League	Play-off round	(Austria) LASK	0–2	1–1	1–3

== Overall record ==
=== By competition ===
Competition	P	W	D	L	GF	GA	GD
UEFA Cup	10	4	2	4	14	15	–1
UEFA Europa League	16	3	6	7	14	20	–6
UEFA Europa Conference League	2	0	1	1	1	3	–2
Total	28	7	9	12	29	38	–9
