= John Robertson (footballer, born 2001) =

Scottish footballer

Personal information
- Date of birth: 26 August 2001 (age 25)
- Place of birth: Edinburgh, Scotland
- Height: 1.73 m (5 ft 8 in)
- Position: Forward

Team information
- Current team: Raith Rovers

Youth career
- Tynecastle

Senior career*
Years	Team	Apps	(Gls)
2017–2021	St Johnstone	7	(0)
2019–2020	→ Cove Rangers (loan)	17	(1)
2020–2021	→ Forfar Athletic (loan)	7	(0)
2021–2023	Edinburgh City	61	(20)
2023	Linfield	7	(0)
2024–2026	East Kilbride		
2026–	Raith Rovers	3	(0)
- * Club domestic league appearances and goals as of 10:58, 23 August 2026 (UTC)

John Robertson (born 26 August 2001) is a Scottish professional footballer who plays as a forward for Raith Rovers.

== Career ==
Born in Edinburgh, Robertson moved from Tynecastle to St Johnstone in June 2017. He made his senior debut on 21 April 2018, and was praised by manager Tommy Wright. He was loaned to Scottish League Two club Cove Rangers in August 2019 and Forfar Athletic in October 2020.

Robertson was released by St Johnstone after the 2020–21 season and he then signed with Edinburgh City. In June 2023 he moved to Northern Irish club Linfield. Robertson had his contract terminated in October 2023.

In May 2026 it was announced that he would join Scottish Championship side Raith Rovers after signing a pre-contract agreement with them, on a two-year contract.

== Career statistics ==
As of match played 23 October 2021

Appearances and goals by club, season and competition
Club	Season	League			Scottish Cup		League Cup		Other		Total	
Club	Season	Division	Apps	Goals	Apps	Goals	Apps	Goals	Apps	Goals	Apps	Goals
St Johnstone	2017–18	Scottish Premiership	2	0	0	0	0	0	0	0	2	0
St Johnstone	2018–19	Scottish Premiership	0	0	0	0	0	0	0	0	0	0
St Johnstone	2019–20	Scottish Premiership	0	0	0	0	0	0	0	0	0	0
St Johnstone	2020–21	Scottish Premiership	5	0	0	0	0	0	0	0	5	0
St Johnstone	Total		7	0	0	0	0	0	0	0	7	0
Cove Rangers (loan)	2019–20	Scottish League Two	17	1	1	0	0	0	1 (Note: Appearance in the Scottish Challenge Cup)	1	19	2
Forfar Athletic (loan)	2020–21	Scottish League One	7	0	0	0	2	0	0	0	9	0
Edinburgh City	2021–22	Scottish League Two	9	1	1	1	0	0	0	0	10	2
Career total			40	2	2	1	2	0	1	1	45	4
