= David Wotherspoon (footballer, born 1990) =

Canadian soccer player

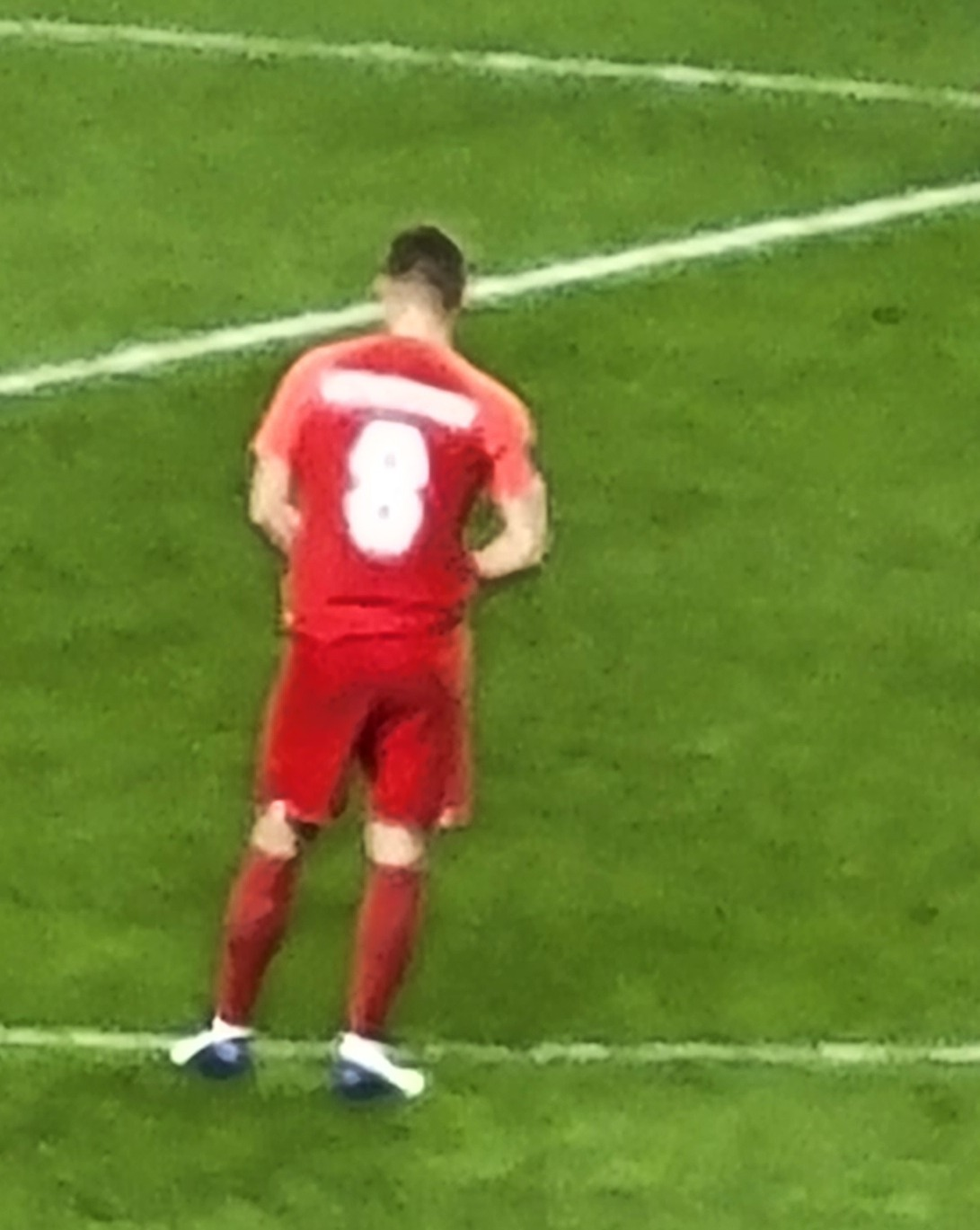

Personal information
- Full name: David Wallace Wotherspoon
- Date of birth: 16 January 1990 (age 36)
- Place of birth: Perth, Scotland
- Height: 1.81 m (5 ft 11 1/2 in)
- Position: Midfielder

Team information
- Current team: Inverness Caledonian Thistle
- Number: 10

Youth career
- Abernethy Cubs
- Bridge of Earn AFC
- St Johnstone
- –2007: Celtic
- 2007–2009: Hibernian

Senior career*
| Years | Team | Apps | (Gls) |
| 2009–2013 | Hibernian | 132 | (7) |
| 2013–2023 | St Johnstone | 295 | (23) |
| 2023–2024 | Inverness Caledonian Thistle | 10 | (3) |
| 2024 | Dundee United | 6 | (0) |
| 2024–2025 | Dunfermline Athletic | 27 | (1) |
| 2025– | Inverness Caledonian Thistle | 28 | (4) |

International career^{‡}
| 2007 | Scotland U18 | 3 | (0) |
| 2008–2009 | Scotland U19 | 5 | (0) |
| 2009–2012 | Scotland U21 | 16 | (2) |
| 2018– | Canada | 13 | (1) |
Medal record
Representing Canada
Men's soccer
CONCACAF Nations League
| Runner-up | 2023 |
- * Club domestic league appearances and goals as of 09:55, 3 May 2026 (UTC) ‡ National team caps and goals as of 9 July 2023

David Wallace Wotherspoon (born 16 January 1990) is a professional soccer player who plays as a midfielder for Scottish Championship club Inverness Caledonian Thistle. Born in Scotland, he represents the Canada national team.

== Club career ==
=== Early career ===
He played at youth level with Abernethy Cubs, Bridge of Earn AFC, and the St Johnstone Academy.

Wotherspoon was part of Celtic's youth setup, but moved to Hibernian in the belief that he would have more opportunity to break into senior football.

=== Hibernian ===
He was part of the Hibernian youth side that won both the Scottish Youth Cup and the Scottish league in the 2008–09 season, with Wotherspoon contributing eight goals from midfield.

Wotherspoon made his senior debut in the 2–1 home win over St Mirren at the start of the 2009–10 season, scoring Hibs' first goal. After establishing himself in the Hibs first team as a right back, Wotherspoon signed a contract with Hibs until 2013.

During the 2010–11 season Wotherspoon was more often used as a right midfielder, and in early 2011 he scored two goals against St Mirren and St Johnstone to help his team go on a six-match unbeaten run. He had previously not scored in 63 matches and said that he wanted to start scoring more goals for Hibs.

Wotherspoon's form improved in the early part of the 2012–13 season. He scored a late winning goal in the Scottish Cup tie against holders and Edinburgh derby rivals Hearts. A decline in Hibs' fortunes during the season was mirrored by Wotherspoon personally, who lost his place in the side. He left Hibs at the end of his contract in the 2013 close season.

=== St Johnstone ===
Wotherspoon signed a two-year contract with his hometown club St Johnstone on 2 July 2013. On 10 July 2013, Wotherspoon scored a goal from a free-kick from 21 yards in a pre-season friendly against Cowdenbeath. This was his first appearance and his first goal for St Johnstone. He scored his first league goal for the club with a free kick in a 4–0 win against Ross County on 17 August, and had a penalty kick saved in the same game. Wotherspoon helped the club win the 2013–14 Scottish Cup. He signed a new two-year contract with St Johnstone in January 2015.

In February 2019, Wotherspoon extended his contract with St Johnstone for another two years. On 26 October 2019, he made his 250th appearance for the club, and marked the occasion by scoring twice as St Johnstone won 3–2 against Hamilton Academical. In 2021 Wotherspoon played a critical role in helping St Johnstone achieve the cup double, winning both the Scottish Cup and the Scottish League Cup. In the Scottish Cup Final, Wotherspoon had an assist on Shaun Rooney's goal and was named Man of the Match for his efforts.

In November 2021 Wotherspoon suffered an ACL injury during St Johnstone's Scottish League Cup semi-final against Celtic, ruling him out for eight months. He returned to training in August 2022. Two months later Wotherspoon made his first appearance for St Johnstone since his injury on 15 October, subbing into their league match against Livingston which ended in a 1–0 defeat. At the end of the season, St Johnstone announced Wotherspoon would not be offered a new contract, ending his time with his hometown club after a decade.

=== Inverness Caledonian Thistle ===
In October 2023, Wotherspoon joined Scottish Championship side Inverness Caledonian Thistle on a deal until January 2024. He made his debut for his new club on October 28 against Airdrieonians, and scored the only goal in a 1–0 victory.

=== Dundee United ===
After leaving Inverness at the end of a short-term contract, Wotherspoon signed with Dundee United for the rest of the 2023–24 season.

=== Dunfermline Athletic ===
Wotherspoon was signed by Dunfermline Athletic in July 2024, after his six-month contract with Dundee United expired.

=== Inverness Caledonian Thistle (Second spell) ===
In July 2025, Wotherspoon returned to Inverness Caledonian Thistle in Scottish League One.

== International career ==
=== Youth ===
Wotherspoon represented Scotland at under-18 and under-19 levels before he made his first team debut for Hibs. He was called into the under-21 squad soon after he made his senior club debut, and he made his first appearance at that level in a 4–0 win against Azerbaijan in November 2009. He scored his first goal for the team, a late equaliser in a 1–1 draw against Sweden, in August 2010. His second goal was the match-winner in a 2–1 victory against the Netherlands in November 2011.

=== Senior ===
Wotherspoon was eligible to play for Canada as his mother was born there. He was selected for the Canada squad in March 2018 for a friendly against New Zealand without ever having been to Canada. He was again called up for a pair of CONCACAF Nations League A matches against Cuba in September 2019. In May 2019 Wotherspoon was named to the provisional squad for the 2019 CONCACAF Gold Cup, but was excluded from the final squad. Wotherspoon scored his first goal for Canada against the Cayman Islands in a 2022 FIFA World Cup qualifying match on 29 March 2021. On 18 June he was named to the 60-man provisional squad for the 2021 CONCACAF Gold Cup, but it was decided due to his heavy club schedule, he would not be a part of the final 23-man team.

In November 2022, Wotherspoon was named to Canada's squad for the 2022 FIFA World Cup. He made his only appearance at the World Cup in Canada's third match against Morocco on December 1, as a substitute for Junior Hoilett. This marked the first time a St Johnstone player took the field in a World Cup match.

In June 2023, Wotherspoon was named to the 23-man Canadian squad contesting the 2023 CONCACAF Nations League Finals. On June 19 he was named to the squad for the 2023 CONCACAF Gold Cup, his first participation at the tournament.

== Style of play ==
Although he started out as a right back for Hibs, Wotherspoon has also played as a right-sided or attacking midfielder. His primary position is as a central midfielder and at the start of the 2011–12 season he expressed his desire to play there more often. Although he also said that he was willing to play anywhere to be in the first team. Manager Pat Fenlon experimented with a 4–2–3–1 formation, using Wotherspoon as a central creative player, during the 2012–13 pre-season. These tactics were abandoned after a 3–0 defeat against Dundee United, with Wotherspoon then being used as a right midfielder in a more orthodox 4–4–2 shape.

In recent years, Wotherspoon has become known for his regular use of the "Spoony chop".

== Personal life ==
Wotherspoon, who is from Bridge of Earn, was a St Johnstone supporter in his childhood. His mother was born in Canada.

== Career statistics ==
=== Club ===
As of match played 10 July 2026

Appearances and goals by club, season and competition
| Club | Season | League | | | Scottish Cup | | League Cup | | Continental | | Total | |
| Club | Season | Division | Apps | Goals | Apps | Goals | Apps | Goals | Apps | Goals | Apps | Goals |
|---|---|---|---|---|---|---|---|---|---|---|---|---|
| Hibernian | 2009–10 | Scottish Premier League | 33 | 1 | 4 (Note: Soccerbase did not record an appearance made by Wotherspoon against Brechin City on 26 August 2009.) | 0 | 2 | 0 | — | | 39 | 1 |
| Hibernian | 2010–11 | Scottish Premier League | 35 | 2 | 2 | 0 | 1 | 0 | 2 (Note: Appearances in UEFA Europa League) | 0 | 40 | 2 |
| Hibernian | 2011–12 | Scottish Premier League | 30 | 0 | 4 | 1 | 3 | 0 | — | | 37 | 1 |
| Hibernian | 2012–13 | Scottish Premier League | 34 | 4 | 3 | 0 | 1 | 0 | — | | 38 | 4 |
| Hibernian | Total | | 132 | 7 | 13 | 1 | 7 | 0 | 2 | 0 | 154 | 8 |
| St Johnstone | 2013–14 | Scottish Premiership | 38 | 1 | 5 | 0 | 3 | 0 | 4 | 0 | 50 | 1 |
| St Johnstone | 2014–15 | Scottish Premiership | 35 | 1 | 2 | 0 | 1 | 0 | 4 | 0 | 42 | 1 |
| St Johnstone | 2015–16 | Scottish Premiership | 35 | 9 | 1 | 0 | 3 | 0 | 1 | 0 | 40 | 9 |
| St Johnstone | 2016–17 | Scottish Premiership | 33 | 1 | 2 | 0 | 3 | 1 | — | | 38 | 2 |
| St Johnstone | 2017–18 | Scottish Premiership | 35 | 3 | 2 | 0 | 1 | 0 | 2 | 0 | 40 | 3 |
| St Johnstone | 2018–19 | Scottish Premiership | 29 | 2 | 2 | 0 | 4 | 0 | — | | 35 | 2 |
| St Johnstone | 2019–20 | Scottish Premiership | 21 | 3 | 3 | 0 | 1 | 0 | — | | 25 | 3 |
| St Johnstone | 2020–21 | Scottish Premiership | 37 | 3 | 5 | 0 | 7 | 3 | — | | 49 | 6 |
| St Johnstone | 2021–22 | Scottish Premiership | 10 | 0 | 0 | 0 | 2 | 0 | 2 (Note: One appearance in UEFA Europa League, one appearance in UEFA Europa Conference League) | 0 | 14 | 0 |
| St Johnstone | 2022–23 | Scottish Premiership | 22 | 0 | 1 | 0 | 0 | 0 | — | | 23 | 0 |
| St Johnstone | Total | | 295 | 23 | 23 | 0 | 25 | 4 | 13 | 0 | 356 | 27 |
| Inverness Caledonian Thistle | 2023–24 | Scottish Championship | 10 | 3 | 1 | 0 | 0 | 0 | — | | 11 | 3 |
| Dundee United | 2023–24 | Scottish Championship | 6 | 0 | 0 | 0 | 0 | 0 | — | | 6 | 0 |
| Dunfermline Athletic | 2024–25 | Scottish Championship | 27 | 1 | 0 | 0 | 10 | 0 | — | | 37 | 1 |
| Inverness Caledonian Thistle | 2025–26 | Scottish League One | 28 | 4 | 2 | 0 | 10 | 1 | — | | 40 | 5 |
| Career total | | | 498 | 34 | 39 | 1 | 52 | 5 | 15 | 0 | 602 | 44 |

=== International ===
As of match played 9 July 2023

Canada
| Year | Apps | Goals |
|---|---|---|
| 2018 | 1 | 0 |
| 2019 | 1 | 0 |
| 2020 | 0 | 0 |
| 2021 | 8 | 1 |
| 2022 | 1 | 0 |
| 2023 | 2 | 0 |
| Total | 13 | 1 |

==== International goals ====
As of 29 March 2021
Scores and results list Canada's goal tally first, score column indicates score after each Wotherspoon goal.

List of international goals scored by David Wotherspoon
| No. | Date | Venue | Opponent | Score | Result | Competition |
|---|---|---|---|---|---|---|
| 1 | 29 March 2021 | IMG Academy, Bradenton, United States | Cayman Islands | 3–0 | 11–0 | 2022 FIFA World Cup qualification |

== Honours ==
St Johnstone

- Scottish Cup: 2013–14, 2020–21
- Scottish League Cup: 2020–21
