= Geoff Brown (businessman) =

Scottish businessman (born 1943)

Geoff Brown OBE
- Born: Perth, Scotland
- Known for: Chairman of St Johnstone F.C. (1986–2011), businessman (construction), racehorse owner
- Term: 1986–2011
- Predecessor: Alex Lamond
- Successor: Steve Brown

Geoffrey Stewart Brown (born c. 1943) is a Scottish businessman. He was chairman of St Johnstone from 1986 until November 2011.

In 1970, Brown founded G. S. Brown Construction, which specialises in homebuilding. Brown is still chairman of the company, which is a family business, with two of his sons also on the board of directors. In June 2011, it was revealed that the company was set to become the shirt sponsors of the club, to mark Brown's quarter-century as chairman.

Brown took control of St Johnstone in 1986, when they were in deep financial trouble and near the bottom of the Scottish Football League. A rights issue raised £150,000, which solved the club's short-term financial problems.

Alex Totten was soon appointed as manager. Under his guidance, the club made a rise from second-bottom in the Scottish Second Division in 1986 to mid-table in the Scottish Premier Division in late 1990. During this period, Brown oversaw the sale of Muirton Park to Asda and the club's move to a newly built McDiarmid Park stadium in the Tulloch area of the city, which was opened in 1989.

In August 2006, to mark Brown's twentieth anniversary as chairman of St Johnstone, the Perthshire Advertiser published his best-of-Saints XI from the past two decades:

1. Alan Main
2. Mark Treanor
3. Callum Davidson
4. Tommy Turner
5. Sergei Baltacha
6. Alan Kernaghan
7. Allan Moore
8. John O'Neil
9. Roddy Grant
10. Paul Wright
11. Harry Curran

As Steve Lomas was presented to the media as the new St Johnstone manager in November 2011, Brown announced that he was going to pass control of the club to his son Steven.

== Personal life ==
Brown married his wife, Joyce, in 1962 and they have three sons (Stuart, Steve and Scott) and a daughter, Susan. His son, Steve, succeeded him as chairman of St Johnstone. Brown is also a racehorse owner and breeder.

Brown underwent a successful operation for prostate cancer in July 2001.

He was appointed Officer of the Order of the British Empire (OBE) in the 2022 New Year Honours for services to Scottish football and the community in Perth.
