= 2021 Scottish Cup final =

Football match

- Event: 2020–21 Scottish Cup
St Johnstone	Hibernian
1	0
- Date: 22 May 2021
- Venue: Hampden Park, Glasgow
- Man of the Match: Shaun Rooney
- Referee: Nick Walsh
- Attendance: 0

The 2021 Scottish Cup final was the 136th final of the Scottish Cup and the final of the 2020–21 Scottish Cup, the most prestigious knockout football competition in Scotland. The match was played on 22 May 2021 at Hampden Park, Glasgow.

St Johnstone completed a cup double by winning the final against Hibernian, having already claimed the 2020–21 Scottish League Cup three months earlier, with Shaun Rooney scoring the winner via a headed goal in both matches. They became the only club outside Celtic, Rangers and Aberdeen to win both cups in the same season. Unusually in the 21st century, all of St Johnstone's starting XI were born in Scotland, although two players featured for other countries at international level.

== Route to the final ==
=== St Johnstone ===
Round	Opposition	Score
3rd	Dundee (A)	1–0
4th	Clyde (H)	2–0
Quarter-final	Rangers (A)	1–1
Semi-final	St Mirren (N)	2–1

As a Premiership club, St Johnstone entered the competition in the third round (last 32). Their first opponent was a Tayside derby at Dens Park against Championship side Dundee. An early goal from Guy Melamed and Zander Clark saving a penalty gave Saints a 1-0 win.

In the fourth round they were drawn against League One club Clyde at home. Early goals from Melamed and Michael O'Halloran gave Saints a comfortable 2–0 win.

The quarter-final saw the team travel to Ibrox Stadium for a match against league champions Rangers. A goalless 90 minutes forced the match into extra-time. James Tavernier appeared to have won the tie for Rangers with a goal late in the second half of extra time, but St Johnstone forced a penalty shootout by equalising during added-on time at the end of extra time. Their goal was scored after a header by goalkeeper Clark, who had come forward for a corner kick, was redirected into the goal by striker Chris Kane. Clark then saved two Rangers penalties in the shootout, which Saints won 4–2.

St Johnstone were then paired with Premiership club St Mirren in the semi-finals. After a goalless first half, Chris Kane and a Glenn Middleton free-kick gave the Perth side a 2–0 lead midway through the second half. Despite a header from Conor McCarthy pulling a goal back for the Paisley side, St Johnstone held on to win 2–1.

=== Hibernian ===
Round	Opposition	Score
3rd	Queen of the South (A)	3–1
4th	Stranraer (A)	4–0
Quarter-final	Motherwell (H)	2–2
Semi-final	Dundee United (N)	2–0

As another Premiership side, Hibernian started in the third round of the Scottish Cup. In that round they played at Championship side Queen of the South. Goals from Christian Doidge (2) and Martin Boyle gave Hibs a 3–1 victory, with James Maxwell scoring a consolation goal for Queens.

Hibs were drawn away again in the fourth round, against League Two side Stranraer. Goals from Doidge, Kevin Nisbet and Boyle (2) gave Hibs a 4–0 victory

The quarter finals had Hibernian drawn at home (Easter Road) with Premiership side Motherwell. Second half goals from Doidge and Jackson Irvine gave Hibs a 2–0 lead, but late goals by Ricki Lamie and Tony Watt forced extra time. The additional period finished goalless, forcing a penalty shootout that Hibs won 4–2.

This meant they took on Dundee United in the semi-final at Hampden Park. Goals from Nisbet and Doidge, the latter of which was scored from an offside position, gave Hibs a 2–0 win.

== Background ==
=== Hosting ===
The final had been originally scheduled for 8 May 2021, but was delayed to 22 May due to rescheduling of earlier rounds caused by the COVID-19 pandemic. The pandemic and building works ahead of the Euro 2020 tournament led to the Scottish FA initially stating that spectators would not be allowed into Hampden, control of which is being passed to UEFA on 14 May for Euro 2020. Aberdeen chairman Dave Cormack told BBC Scotland on 10 May that he would make their Pittodrie Stadium available for the final, as it could admit at least 500 fans. Rangers, Celtic, Hearts and the Scottish Rugby Union had earlier rejected approaches from the Scottish FA for the use of their stadiums. On 11 May it was reported that UEFA had accepted a request from the Scottish FA to admit fans to Hampden. Scottish Government rules regarding the pandemic for areas in Level 2 mean that permission would be needed for any crowd in excess of 500. 600 fans were initially permitted, but this decision was reversed after the government decided to keep Glasgow in Level 3.

=== European place ===
St Johnstone entered the third qualifying round of the 2021–22 UEFA Europa League.

=== Previous appearances ===
Going into the 2021 final, St Johnstone had won the Scottish Cup once in their only previous appearance in a final (2014). Hibernian had won the Scottish Cup three times from 14 appearances in the final. Their most recent victory and appearance in the final was in 2016. It was the first meeting of the clubs in a Scottish Cup Final.

== Match ==
=== Summary ===
In the 32nd minute David Wotherspoon crossed from the left to the far post where Shaun Rooney headed to the left corner of the net from five yards out for the only goal of the match. With fifteen minutes to go Hibernian's Paul McGinn brought down Chris Kane in the penalty area, but goalkeeper Matt Macey saved the penalty from Glenn Middleton and the follow-up from Chris Kane.

=== Details ===
22 May 2021
14:00

St Johnstone	1–0	Hibernian
Rooney 32'	Report

Hampden Park, Glasgow
Referee: Nick Walsh

St Johnstone	Hibernian

GK	1	(Scotland) Zander Clark
CB	5	(Scotland) Jason Kerr (c)
CB	6	(Scotland) Liam Gordon
CB	4	(Scotland) Jamie McCart
RM	19	(Scotland) Shaun Rooney	(substituted off) 79'
CM	18	(Northern Ireland) Ali McCann
CM	13	(Scotland) Craig Bryson	(substituted off) 64'
LM	24	(Scotland) Callum Booth
AM	16	(Scotland) Glenn Middleton	(substituted off) 82'
AM	10	(Canada) David Wotherspoon
FW	9	(Scotland) Chris Kane
Substitutes:
DF	2	(England) James Brown	(substituted on) 79'
DF	3	(England) Scott Tanser
FW	7	(Scotland) Craig Conway
MF	8	(Scotland) Murray Davidson	(substituted on) 64'
FW	11	(Scotland) Michael O'Halloran	(substituted on) 82'
GK	12	(England) Elliot Parish
FW	14	(Scotland) Stevie May
FW	17	(Israel) Guy Melamed
MF	26	(Scotland) Liam Craig
Manager:
(Scotland) Callum Davidson

GK	33	(England) Matt Macey
RB	6	(Scotland) Paul McGinn (yellow card) 74'
CB	5	(Scotland) Ryan Porteous (yellow card) 87'
CB	4	(Scotland) Paul Hanlon (c)
LB	25	(Scotland) Josh Doig	(substituted off) 76'
RM	10	(Australia) Martin Boyle (yellow card) 88'
CM	13	(Cyprus) Alex Gogić	(substituted off) 56'
CM	11	(England) Joe Newell	(substituted off) 72'
LM	36	(Australia) Jackson Irvine (yellow card) 44'
FW	9	(Wales) Christian Doidge
FW	15	(Scotland) Kevin Nisbet
Substitutes:
GK	1	(Israel) Ofir Marciano
DF	2	(Scotland) David Gray
MF	7	(Scotland) Kyle Magennis
MF	8	(England) Drey Wright
DF	16	(Scotland) Lewis Stevenson	(substituted on) 76'
FW	18	(Scotland) Jamie Murphy	(substituted on) 56'
MF	20	(Sweden) Melker Hallberg	(substituted on) 72'
DF	24	(Scotland) Darren McGregor
Manager:
(Scotland) Jack Ross

Match rules

- 90 minutes
- 30 minutes of extra time if necessary
- Penalty shoot-out if scores still level
- Nine named substitutes
- Maximum of five substitutions in normal time (a sixth substitute is permitted in extra time)

== Media coverage ==
BBC Scotland and Premier Sports obtained the rights to broadcast the final, in what is the third season of a six-year deal in the United Kingdom to broadcast Scottish Cup matches.
