= Jamie McCart =

Scottish footballer

- McCart in 2026

Personal information
- Full name: Jamie Daniel McCart
- Date of birth: 20 June 1997 (age 29)
- Place of birth: Bellshill, Scotland
- Position: Defender

Team information
- Current team: Heart of Midlothian
- Number: 5

Youth career
- Celtic

Senior career*
Years	Team	Apps	(Gls)
2016–2018	Celtic	1	(0)
2017	→ Inverness Caledonian Thistle (loan)	11	(0)
2017	→ St Mirren (loan)	3	(0)
2018	→ Alloa Athletic (loan)	13	(1)
2018–2020	Inverness Caledonian Thistle	45	(2)
2020–2022	St Johnstone	82	(1)
2022–2025	Rotherham United	24	(0)
2023	→ Leyton Orient (loan)	8	(0)
2023–2024	→ Barnsley (loan)	26	(0)
2025–	Heart of Midlothian	42	(1)

International career^{‡}
2015	Scotland U19	6	(0)
2017	Scotland U21	1	(0)
Medal record
Scotland
Toulon Tournament
Bronze medal – third place	2017 Toulon	U–20 Competition
- * Club domestic league appearances and goals as of 22 November 2026 ‡ National team caps and goals as of 4 March 2019

Jamie Daniel McCart (born 20 June 1997) is a Scottish professional footballer who plays as a defender for Scottish Premiership club Heart of Midlothian.

McCart has previously played for Celtic, Inverness Caledonian Thistle, St Johnstone and Rotherham, as well as on loan for St Mirren, Alloa Athletic, Leyton Orient and Barnsley.

== Club career ==
=== Celtic ===
A product of Celtic's youth system, McCart made his competitive debut for the Glasgow club as a substitute against Motherwell in the Scottish League Cup during August 2016.

On 31 January 2017, McCart joined Inverness Caledonian Thistle on a loan deal until the end of the season. He then made an emergency loan move to St Mirren in September 2017, and returned to Celtic at the end of the year having made just three appearances for the Buddies. McCart moved on loan again in January 2018, joining Scottish League One side Alloa Athletic until the end of the season.

=== Inverness Caledonian Thistle ===
McCart returned to Inverness ahead of the 2018–19 season, signing a two-year contract with the club.

=== St Johnstone ===
McCart signed a pre-contract agreement with St Johnstone in January 2020. Later in the month, Inverness and St Johnstone agreed a deal that allowed him to join the Saints immediately. He quickly established a defensive partnership with Jason Kerr and Liam Gordon. McCart won an unprecedented Cup Double with Saints by winning both the League Cup and Scottish Cup in the 2020-2021 season.

=== Rotherham United ===
On 27 June 2022, McCart signed a three-year contract with EFL Championship side Rotherham United, after signing a pre-contract earlier in the month. McCart made just one league start for Rotherham during the first half of the 2022–23 season, and he moved on loan to Leyton Orient in January 2023 and then Barnsley before returning to play as a regular starter for Rotherham, now in League One.

=== Heart of Midlothian ===
On 2 January 2025, McCart signed a pre-contract agreement to join Heart of Midlothian. The following day, the two clubs agreed an undisclosed fee for McCart to move to Hearts immediately.

== International career ==
In March 2017 he made his debut for the Scotland Under-21 side in a friendly against Estonia.

Selected for the Scotland under-20 squad in the 2017 Toulon Tournament. The team went to claim the bronze medal. It was the nation's first ever medal at the competition.

== Personal life ==
He is the son of former Motherwell defender Chris McCart, who is now the Head of Celtic's Youth Academy.

== Career statistics ==
As of 22 November 2026

Appearances and goals by club, season and competition
Club	Season	League			National cup (Note: Includes Scottish Cup, FA Cup.)		League cup (Note: Includes Scottish League Cup, EFL Cup.)		Other		Total	
Club	Season	Division	Apps	Goals	Apps	Goals	Apps	Goals	Apps	Goals	Apps	Goals
Celtic	2016–17	Scottish Premiership	0	0	0	0	1	0	0	0	1	0
Celtic	2017–18	Scottish Premiership	0	0	0	0	0	0	0	0	0	0
Celtic	Total		0	0	0	0	1	0	0	0	1	0
Celtic U-20s	2016–17	SPFL; Development League	—		—		—		3 (Note: Appearances in the Scottish Challenge Cup)	0	3	0
Celtic U-20s	2017–18	SPFL; Development League	—		—		—		1	0	1	0
Inverness Caledonian Thistle (loan)	2016–17	Scottish Premiership	11	0	0	0	0	0	—		11	0
St Mirren (loan)	2017–18	Scottish Championship	3	0	0	0	0	0	0	0	3	0
Alloa Athletic (loan)	2017–18	Scottish League One	13	1	1	0	0	0	4 (Note: Appearances in the Scottish Championship play-offs)	0	18	1
Inverness Caledonian Thistle	2018–19	Scottish Championship	26	1	7	0	0	0	5 (Note: One appearance in the Scottish Challenge Cup and five appearances in the Scottish Premiership play-offs)	0	38	1
Inverness Caledonian Thistle	2019–20	Scottish Championship	19	1	0	0	4	0	1	0	24	1
Inverness Caledonian Thistle	Total		45	2	7	0	4	0	6	0	62	2
St Johnstone	2019–20	Scottish Premiership	8	0	2	0	0	0	—		10	0
St Johnstone	2020–21	Scottish Premiership	37	0	5	0	6	0	—		48	0
St Johnstone	2021–22	Scottish Premiership	37	1	1	0	3	1	5 (Note: Two appearances in the UEFA Europa League, two appearance in the UEFA Conference League and one appearance in the Scottish Premiership play-offs.)	0	46	1
St Johnstone	Total		82	1	8	0	9	1	5	0	104	2
Rotherham United	2022–23	EFL Championship	7	0	1	0	2	0	—		10	0
Rotherham United	2023–24	EFL Championship	1	0	0	0	2	0	—		3	0
Rotherham United	2024–25	EFL League One	16	0	0	0	2	1	2	0	20	1
Rotherham United	Total		34	0	1	0	6	1	2	0	33	1
Leyton Orient (loan)	2022–23	EFL League Two	8	0	—		—		—		8	0
Barnsley (loan)	2023–24	EFL League One	26	0	2	0	0	0	2	0	32	0
Heart of Midlothian	2024–25	Scottish Premiership	11	1	3	0	0	0	0	0	14	1
Heart of Midlothian	2025–26	Scottish Premiership	20	0	1	0	0	0	0	0	21	0
Heart of Midlothian	2026–27	Scottish Premiership	11	0	0	0	3	0	9	0	23	0
Heart of Midlothian	Total		42	1	4	0	3	0	9	0	58	1
Career total			264	5	23	0	23	2	32	0	334	7

== Honours ==
St Johnstone

- Scottish Cup: 2020–21
- Scottish League Cup: 2020–21

Leyton Orient

- EFL League Two: 2022–23
