= Shaun Rooney =

Scottish footballer (born 1996)

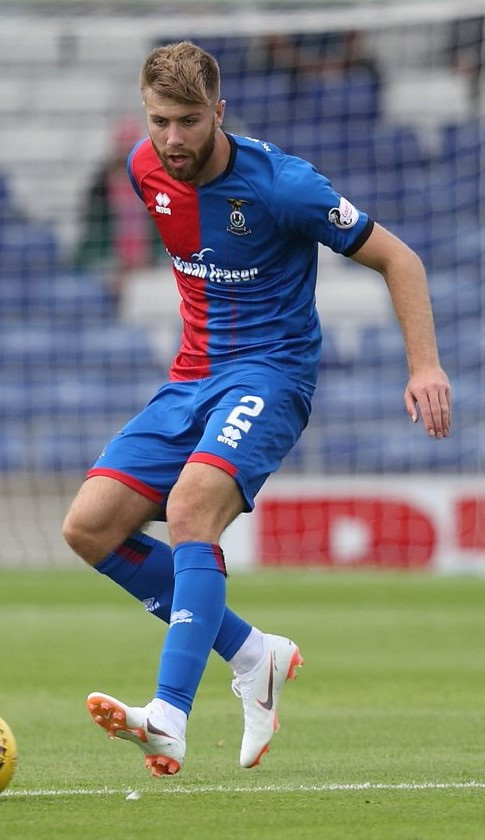
- Rooney playing for Inverness Caledonian Thistle in 2018

Personal information
- Full name: Shaun Antony Rooney
- Date of birth: 26 July 1996 (age 30)
- Place of birth: Bellshill, Scotland
- Height: 6 ft 3 in (1.91 m)
- Position: Defender

Team information
- Current team: Fleetwood Town
- Number: 26

Youth career
- 2010–2013: Dundee United

Senior career*
Years	Team	Apps	(Gls)
2013–2015	Queen's Park	32	(4)
2015–2016	Dunfermline Athletic	11	(1)
2016–2017	York City	30	(1)
2017–2018	Queen of the South	24	(0)
2018–2020	Inverness Caledonian Thistle	56	(8)
2020–2022	St Johnstone	50	(3)
2022–2024	Fleetwood Town	53	(7)
2024	St Mirren	6	(0)
2025–	Fleetwood Town	3	(1)
- * Club domestic league appearances and goals as of 20:51 28 January 2024 (UTC)

Shaun Antony Rooney (born 26 July 1996) is a Scottish professional footballer who plays as a defender for EFL League Two club Fleetwood Town. He has previously played for Queen's Park, Dunfermline Athletic, York City, Queen of the South, Inverness Caledonian Thistle, St Johnstone, St Mirren and another spell at Fleetwood.

== Career ==
=== Queen's Park ===
Rooney was born in Bellshill, North Lanarkshire. He started his career playing youth football with Bellshill Boys Club and Dundee United, before signing with Scottish League Two club Queen's Park in July 2013. Rooney's first-team debut came shortly after signing for the club, in a Scottish Challenge Cup defeat against Ayr United at Hampden Park. During the 2013–14 season, Rooney made 11 appearances for Queen's Park. His breakthrough season came in 2014–15, when he played in 30 matches, scoring his first goal on 15 November 2014 with a header against Elgin City in a 4–1 win. Rooney's impressive performances for Queen's Park saw him awarded the club's Young Player of the Year and also being named in the PFA Scotland Scottish League Two Team of the Year.

=== Dunfermline Athletic ===
The start of 2015–16 saw Rooney go on trial with both Hearts and St Mirren, however it was Dunfermline Athletic that he eventually signed with. Rooney appeared initially on trial with Dunfermline in August 2015 and was a named substitute against Peterhead and Stranraer, replacing Lewis Martin in defence against Stranraer. His debut after signing for the club came as a first half substitute against Ayr United, replacing Callum Fordyce after the Dunfermline captain was injured. Rooney's first goal for Dunfermline came against Stenhousemuir in December 2015, scoring the only goal in a 1–0 victory at East End Park. He made 14 appearances and scored one goal as Dunfermline won the Scottish League One title in 2015–16.

=== York City ===
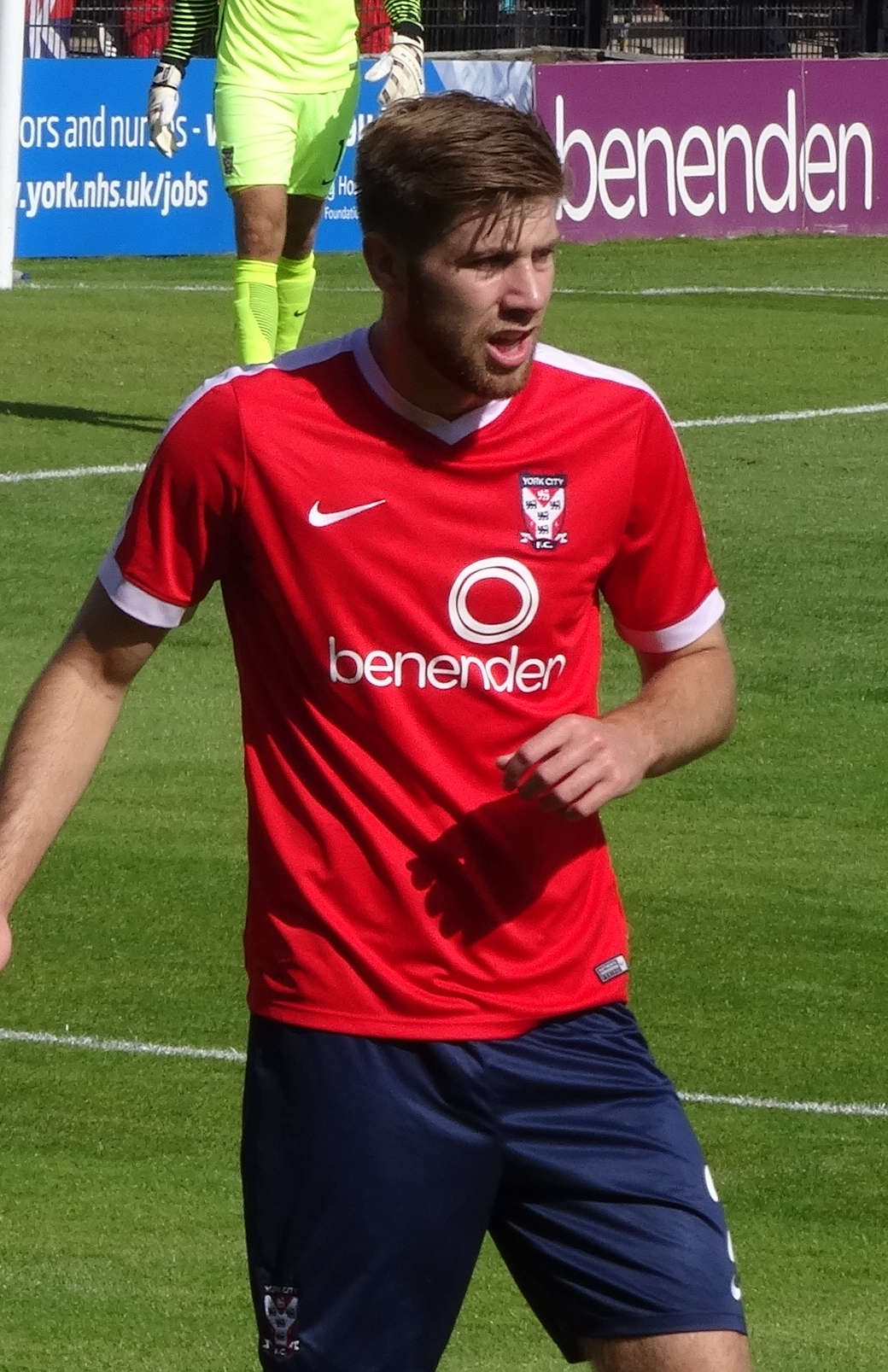
Rooney playing for York City in 2016

Rooney joined newly relegated National League club York City on 23 May 2016 on a two-year contract. On 21 May 2017, Rooney came on as a 75th-minute substitute as York beat Macclesfield Town 3–2 at Wembley Stadium in the 2017 FA Trophy Final. Rooney completed 2016–17 with 38 appearances and one goal in all competitions while York were relegated to the National League North with a 21st-place finish in the table.

=== Queen of the South ===
Rooney signed for Scottish Championship club Queen of the South on 9 June 2017 on a one-year contract.

=== Inverness Caledonian Thistle ===
On 25 April 2018, Rooney signed a pre-contract agreement to join Scottish Championship club Inverness Caledonian Thistle on 1 June 2018 upon the expiration of his contract at Queen of the South. He made his debut on 14 July, starting in a 2–0 home win over Cove Rangers in the Scottish League Cup. He scored his first goal for Inverness on 1 September with a 51st-minute header from Tom Walsh's cross in a 3–0 away win over Dunfermline in the league.

=== St Johnstone ===
In June 2020, Rooney moved to St Johnstone on a two-year deal, having signed a pre-contract earlier in the year. On 28 February 2021 he scored the winning goal as St Johnstone beat Livingston 1–0 in the 2021 Scottish League Cup Final. On 22 May 2021, through a header in the 32nd minute Rooney scored the only goal of the 2021 Scottish Cup Final against Hibernian as St Johnstone won 1–0 at Hampden Park to complete a historic cup double, becoming the fifth player in the 21st century to score in both cup finals in the same season.

=== Fleetwood Town ===
Rooney signed for League One club Fleetwood Town on 25 May 2022 on a two-year contract.

=== St Mirren ===
In May 2024, Rooney signed a two-year contract at Scottish Premiership club St Mirren.

On 26 September 2024, the club announced that Rooney had been suspended due to his involvement in an alleged incident in Glasgow the previous week. On 27 September 2024, Police Scotland confirmed that Rooney had been arrested and charged with assaulting an 18-year-old woman and a breach of the peace involving an 18-year-old male, with the latter treated as a hate crime. On 24 September 2025 Rooney was found not guilty of both charges.

On 18 October 2024, St Mirren announced that Rooney had left the club by mutual consent..

=== Return to Fleetwood Town ===
On 4 January 2025, Rooney returned to Fleetwood Town on a short term deal subject to international clearance.

On 21 January 2025, Rooney scored his first goal for Fleetwood after his return vs MK Dons at home in the league.

== Personal life ==
His great-uncle Benny Rooney was also a footballer, mainly with St Johnstone, and his great-grandfather Bob also played but was better known as a physiotherapist at Celtic.

== Career statistics ==
As of match played 11 February 2023

Appearances and goals by club, season and competition
Club	Season	League			National Cup (Note: Includes Scottish Cup, FA Cup)		League Cup (Note: Includes Scottish League Cup, EFL Cup)		Europe		Other		Total	
Club	Season	Division	Apps	Goals	Apps	Goals	Apps	Goals	Apps	Goals	Apps	Goals	Apps	Goals
Queen's Park	2013–14	Scottish League Two	8	0	1	0	1	0	—		1 (Note: Appearance(s) in Scottish Challenge Cup)	0	11	0
Queen's Park	2014–15	Scottish League Two	24	4	2	0	0	0	—		4 (Note: Appearances in Scottish League One play-offs)	0	30	4
Queen's Park	Total		32	4	3	0	1	0	—		5	0	41	4
Dunfermline Athletic	2015–16	Scottish League One	11	1	2	0	0	0	—		1	0	14	1
York City	2016–17	National League	30	1	2	0	—		—		6 (Note: Appearances in FA Trophy)	0	38	1
Queen of the South	2017–18	Scottish Championship	24	0	3	0	3	1	—		4	2	34	3
Inverness Caledonian Thistle	2018–19	Scottish Championship	31	5	6	1	4	0	—		5 (Note: One appearance in Scottish Challenge Cup, four in Scottish Premiership play-offs)	0	46	6
Inverness Caledonian Thistle	2019–20	Scottish Championship	25	3	3	0	0	0	—		3	0	31	3
Inverness Caledonian Thistle	Total		56	8	9	1	4	0	—		8	0	77	9
St Johnstone	2020–21	Scottish Premiership	27	2	4	1	8	3	—		—		39	6
St Johnstone	2021–22	Scottish Premiership	23	1	0	0	3	1	4 (Note: Two appearances in UEFA Europa League, two in UEFA Europa Conference League)	0	2 (Note: Appearances in Scottish Premiership play-offs)	2	32	4
St Johnstone	Total		50	3	4	1	11	4	4	0	2	2	71	10
St mirren	2022–23	Scottish premiership	463	0	2	0	2	0	—		2 (Note: Appearances in EFL Trophy)	0	28	5
Career total			225	22	25	2	21	4	4	0	28	4	303	32

== Honours ==
Dunfermline Athletic

- Scottish League One: 2015–16

York City

- FA Trophy: 2016–17

St Johnstone

- Scottish Cup: 2020–21
- Scottish League Cup: 2020–21

Individual

- PFA Scotland Team of the Year: 2014–15 Scottish League Two
- Queen's Park Young Player of the Year: 2014–15
