= Alex Totten =

Scottish footballer and manager

Personal information
- Full name: Alexander Totten
- Date of birth: 12 February 1946 (age 80)
- Place of birth: Dennyloanhead, Scotland
- Position: Full-back

Youth career
- 1960–1964: Liverpool

Senior career*
Years	Team	Apps	(Gls)
1964–1965	Dundee	9	(0)
1965–1969	Dunfermline Athletic	30	(0)
1969–1971	Falkirk	21	(1)
1971–1973	Queen of the South	62	(6)
1973–1978	Alloa Athletic	52	(2)
Total		174	(9)

Managerial career
- 1980–1982: Alloa Athletic
- 1982–1984: Falkirk
- 1986: Rangers (caretaker)
- 1986–1987: Dumbarton
- 1987–1992: St Johnstone
- 1992–1993: East Fife
- 1994–1996: Kilmarnock
- 1996–2002: Falkirk
- * Club domestic league appearances and goals

Alexander Totten (born 12 February 1946) is a Scottish former football player and manager.

== Playing career ==
Growing up in Dennyloanhead, Stirlingshire, he signed for Liverpool straight from school in 1960 before signing for top division Dundee back in Scotland in 1964. After a season, he moved onto Dunfermline Athletic where he made nearly 30 top division league appearances over four seasons. In 1969, he moved on to Falkirk, racking up another 20 starts over his two seasons at Brockville and also scoring his first Senior goal.

In July 1971 Totten transferred to Dumfries side Queen of the South and became a first team regular for the first time his career in the lower division. His final transfer came in July 1973 with a move to Alloa Athletic where he wound down his on-field career and became manager in 1980.

== Managerial career ==
Three years as a manager for Alloa Athletic ended when he became manager at previous club Falkirk after leading Alloa Athletic to the Scottish First Division and a 6th-place finish. He then moved to Rangers to become Jock Wallace's assistant, expecting to – in time – become manager. However, when Graeme Souness was appointed in 1986, Totten left to manage Dumbarton. He then took St Johnstone from the old Second Division to the Premier Division in the space of three seasons. He also led St Johnstone to Scottish Cup semi-final appearances in 1989 and 1991. Totten's role in St Johnstone's progress was rewarded when he was made SFWA Manager of the Year for 1991, but Geoff Brown sacked Totten in 1992 for demanding too much money for new players.

Totten then managed East Fife and Kilmarnock, before returning to Falkirk as a manager in 1996. He guided Falkirk to the 1997 Scottish Cup Final, having defeated Celtic in the semi-final. Falkirk lost 1–0 to Kilmarnock, who had sacked Totten earlier that season, in the final. Totten was eventually moved into a director of football role by Falkirk in 2002. Falkirk played Rangers in a testimonial match for Totten on 21 July 2007 at the Falkirk Stadium. The match ended 1–1 with Lee McCulloch scoring for Rangers and Pedro Moutinho scoring for Falkirk.

== Honours ==
=== Manager ===
Alloa Athletic

- Stirlingshire Cup : 1981–82
- Scottish Second Division promotion :1981–82

St Johnstone

- Scottish Second Division promotion : 1987–88
- Scottish First Division : 1989–90

Falkirk

- Stirlingshire Cup : 1997–98, 1999–2000
- Scottish Challenge Cup : 1997–98
