= James Brown (footballer, born January 1998) =

Maltese footballer

Personal information
- Full name: James Dominic Brown
- Date of birth: 12 January 1998 (age 28)
- Place of birth: Dover, England
- Position: Defender

Team information
- Current team: Marine
- Number: 2

Youth career
- –2016: Millwall

Senior career*
| Years | Team | Apps | (Gls) |
| 2016–2021 | Millwall | 1 | (0) |
| 2017–2018 | → Carlisle United (loan) | 27 | (0) |
| 2018–2019 | → Livingston (loan) | 1 | (0) |
| 2019 | → Lincoln City (loan) | 0 | (0) |
| 2021 | → St Johnstone (loan) | 5 | (0) |
| 2021–2024 | St Johnstone | 59 | (1) |
| 2024 | → Raith Rovers (loan) | 12 | (0) |
| 2024– | Marine | 54 | (3) |

International career^{‡}
| 2022– | Malta | 3 | (0) |
- * Club domestic league appearances and goals as of 12:45, 26 April 2026 ‡ National team caps and goals as of 17:58, 27 March 2023 (UTC)

James Dominic Brown (born 12 January 1998) is a semi-professional footballer who plays as a defender for National League North club Marine. Born in England, he plays for the Malta national team.

== Club career ==
=== Millwall ===
Brown started his career in the youth team at Millwall and signed his first professional contract in April 2016. He made his professional debut in October 2016, in a 2–1 EFL Trophy victory over Gillingham.

In August 2017, Brown joined Carlisle United on loan. He made his debut for the club four days later on 29 August 2017, in an EFL Trophy match. He made his Football League debut for the club on 12 September in a match against Coventry City.

On 2 August 2018, Brown joined newly promoted Scottish Premiership side Livingston on a six-month loan deal.

=== St Johnstone ===
On 4 January 2021, Brown joined Scottish club St Johnstone on loan until the end of the season, following the recall of Millwall teammate Danny McNamara. Brown enjoyed success with the Saints in his brief loan spell, winning both the Scottish League Cup and the Scottish Cup with the side. In July 2021, Brown signed a two-year deal with St Johnstone. In February 2024, he moved on loan to Raith Rovers . In May 2024, he was released by St Johnstone.

=== Marine ===
On 5 September 2024, Brown joined newly promoted National League North club Marine.

== International career ==
Brown was born in England, and is of Maltese descent through a grandfather. He was first called up to the Malta national team in October 2021. He was again called up in May 2022 and made his debut on 1 June in a 1–0 defeat against Venezuela.

== Personal life ==
Brown was born in Dover, Kent and attended Dover Grammar School for Boys in the town. He is of Maltese descent.

== Career statistics ==
As of match played 5 August 2021

Appearances and goals by club, season and competition
| Club | Season | League | | | FA Cup | | League Cup | | Europe | | Other | | Total | |
| Club | Season | Division | Apps | Goals | Apps | Goals | Apps | Goals | Apps | Goals | Apps | Goals | Apps | Goals |
|---|---|---|---|---|---|---|---|---|---|---|---|---|---|---|
| Millwall | 2016–17 | League One | 0 | 0 | 0 | 0 | 0 | 0 | — | | 1 (Note: Appearances in the EFL Trophy) | 0 | 1 | 0 |
| Millwall | 2017–18 | EFL Championship | 0 | 0 | 0 | 0 | 0 | 0 | — | | 0 | 0 | 0 | 0 |
| Millwall | 2018–19 | EFL Championship | 0 | 0 | 0 | 0 | 0 | 0 | — | | 0 | 0 | 0 | 0 |
| Millwall | 2019–20 | EFL Championship | 1 | 0 | 2 | 0 | 0 | 0 | — | | 0 | 0 | 3 | 0 |
| Millwall | 2020–21 | EFL Championship | 0 | 0 | 0 | 0 | 0 | 0 | — | | 0 | 0 | 0 | 0 |
| Millwall | Total | | 1 | 0 | 2 | 0 | 0 | 0 | 0 | 0 | 1 | 0 | 4 | 0 |
| Carlisle United (loan) | 2017–18 | League Two | 27 | 0 | 5 | 0 | 0 | 0 | — | | 2 | 0 | 34 | 0 |
| Livingston (loan) | 2018–19 | Scottish Premiership | 1 | 0 | 0 | 0 | 0 | 0 | — | | — | | 1 | 0 |
| Lincoln City (loan) | 2019–20 | EFL League One | 0 | 0 | 0 | 0 | 0 | 0 | — | | 0 | 0 | 0 | 0 |
| St Johnstone (loan) | 2020–21 | Scottish Premiership | 5 | 0 | 2 | 0 | 0 | 0 | — | | — | | 7 | 0 |
| St Johnstone | 2021–22 | Scottish Premiership | 0 | 0 | 0 | 0 | 0 | 0 | 1 (Note: Appearances in the UEFA Europa League) | 0 | — | | 1 | 0 |
| Career total | | | 34 | 0 | 9 | 0 | 0 | 0 | 1 | 0 | 3 | 0 | 47 | 0 |

== Honours ==
St Johnstone

- Scottish Cup: 2020–21
- Scottish League Cup: 2020–21
