= Guy Melamed (footballer, born 1992) =

Israeli footballer

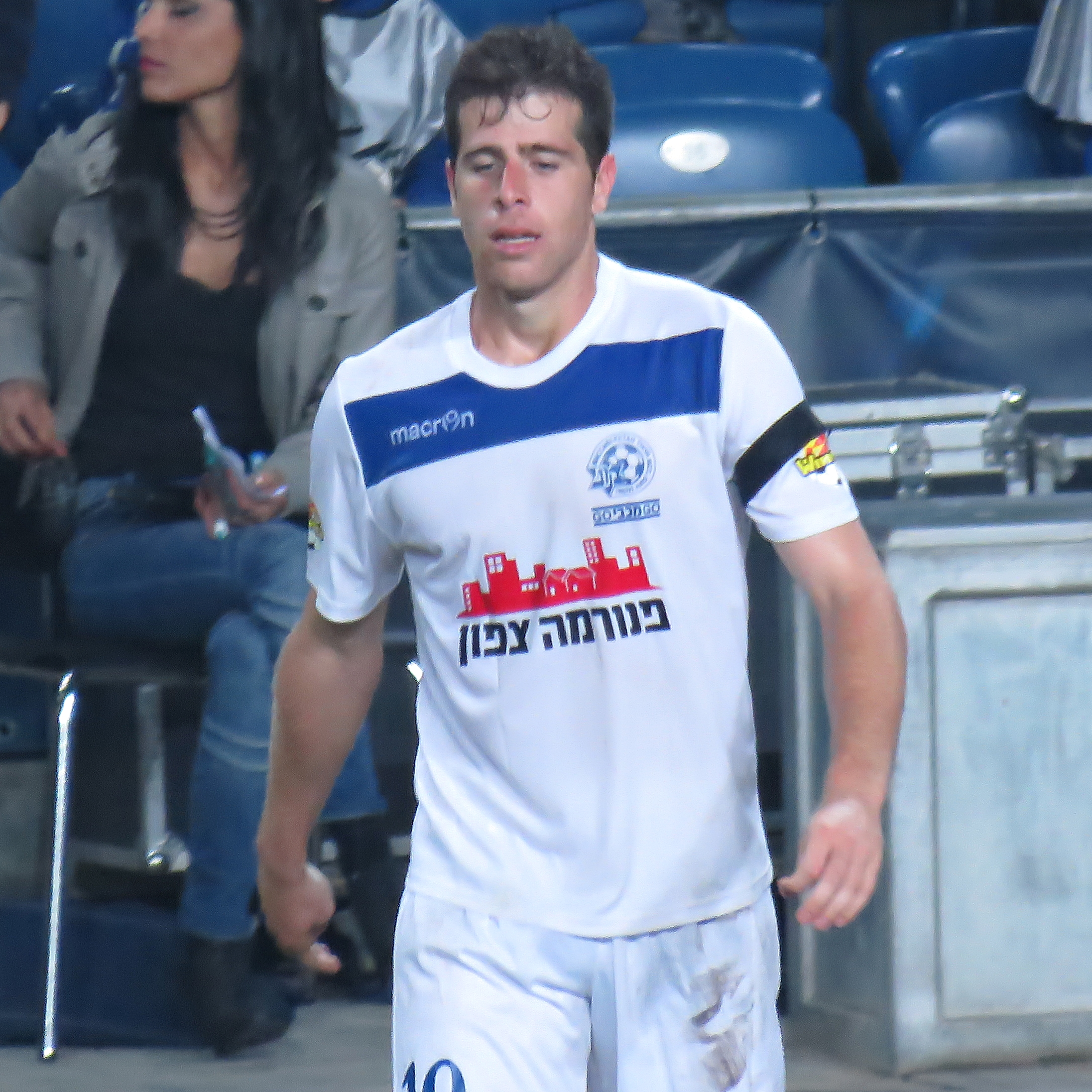

Personal information
- Full name: Guy Melamed
- Date of birth: 21 December 1992 (age 33)
- Place of birth: Ra'anana, Israel
- Height: 1.73 m (5 ft 8 in)
- Position: Forward

Team information
- Current team: Maccabi Haifa
- Number: 18

Youth career
- 2003–2012: Hapoel Kfar Saba

Senior career*
Years	Team	Apps	(Gls)
2011–2013	Hapoel Kfar Saba	22	(5)
2013–2017	Maccabi Petah Tikva	85	(20)
2014	→ Maccabi Herzliya (loan)	15	(6)
2017–2018	Hapoel Be'er Sheva	17	(5)
2018–2020	Maccabi Netanya	60	(17)
2020–2021	St Johnstone	18	(5)
2021–2023	Bnei Sakhnin	62	(21)
2023–2025	Hapoel Haifa	50	(34)
2025–	Maccabi Haifa	17	(7)

International career^{‡}
2022–	Israel	3	(1)
- * Club domestic league appearances and goals as of 27 June 2025 ‡ National team caps and goals as of 11 June 2024

Guy Melamed (Hebrew: גיא מלמד; born 21 December 1992) is an Israeli professional footballer who plays for Israeli Premier League club Maccabi Haifa.

== Early life ==
Melamed was born in Ra'anana, Israel, to a Sephardic Jewish family.

== Career ==
On 5 October 2020, Melamed joined St Johnstone on a free transfer, signing a one-year deal. Melamed left St Johnstone at the end of his contract in June 2021 after having played a key role for the Perth club as they landed an historic cup double.

In August 2021, Melamed returned to his native country, signing for Bnei Sakhnin in the Israeli Premier League.

== Career statistics ==
As of 24 January 2025

Appearances and goals by club, season and competition
Club	Season	League			National Cup		League Cup		Other		Total	
Club	Season	Division	Apps	Goals	Apps	Goals	Apps	Goals	Apps	Goals	Apps	Goals
Maccabi Petah Tikva	2013–14	Israeli Premier League	7	1	0	0	0	0	–		7	1
Maccabi Petah Tikva	2014–15	Israeli Premier League	27	4	3	0	5	0	–		35	4
Maccabi Petah Tikva	2015–16	Israeli Premier League	23	6	1	1	6	1	–		30	8
Maccabi Petah Tikva	2016–17	Israeli Premier League	28	9	4	3	3	0	–		35	12
Maccabi Petah Tikva	Total		81	20	8	4	14	1	–		103	25
Maccabi Herzliya (loan)	2013–14	Liga Leumit	15	6	0	0	0	0	–		15	6
Hapoel Be'er Sheva	2017–18	Israeli Premier League	16	4	4	2	2	0	–		22	6
Hapoel Be'er Sheva	2018–19	Israeli Premier League	1	1	–		1	1	0	0	2	2
Hapoel Be'er Sheva	Total		17	5	4	2	3	1	0	0	24	8
Maccabi Netanya	2018–19	Israeli Premier League	30	9	6	3	4	1	–		40	13
Maccabi Netanya	2019–20	Israeli Premier League	30	8	1	0	4	1	–		35	9
Maccabi Netanya	2020–21	Israeli Premier League	–		–		1	0	–		1	0
Maccabi Netanya	Total		60	17	7	3	9	2	–		76	22
St Johnstone	2020–21	Scottish Premiership	18	5	4	2	1	0	–		23	7
Bnei Sakhnin	2021–22	Israeli Premier League	33	9	2	1	0	0	–		35	10
Bnei Sakhnin	2022–23	Israeli Premier League	29	12	2	3	4	1	–		35	16
Bnei Sakhnin	Total		62	21	4	4	4	1	–		70	26
Hapoel Haifa	2023–24	Israeli Premier League	32	17	1	0	2	1	–		35	18
Hapoel Haifa	2024–25	Israeli Premier League	18	17	2	1	5	3	–		25	21
Hapoel Haifa	Total		50	34	3	1	7	4	–		60	39
Maccabi Haifa	2024–25	Israeli Premier League	0	0	0	0	0	0	–		0	0
Career total			303	118	30	16	38	9	0	0	371	143

== International goals ==
No.	Date	Venue	Opponent	Score	Result	Competition
1.	11 June 2024	Szusza Ferenc Stadion, Budapest, Hungary	Belarus	1–0	4–0	Friendly

== Honours ==
=== Club ===
Hapoel Be'er Sheva

- Israeli Premier League: 2017–18

St Johnstone

- Scottish Cup: 2020–21
- Scottish League Cup: 2020–21
