= St Johnstone F.C. =

Association football club in Perth, Scotland

St Johnstone
- Full name: St Johnstone Football Club
- Nickname: The Saints
- Founded: 1884 (142 years ago)
- Ground: McDiarmid Park
- Capacity: 10,696
- Coordinates: 56°24′36″N 3°28′36″W
- Owner: Adam Webb
- CEO: Francis Smith
- Manager: Simo Valakari
- League: Scottish Premiership
- 2025–26: Scottish Championship, 1st of 10 (promoted)
- Website: www.perthstjohnstonefc.co.uk
Home colours	Away colours

St Johnstone Football Club is a professional association football club in Perth, Scotland. The team competes in the Scottish Premiership, the top division of Scottish football. The club's name is derived from St John's Toun (or Saint Johnstoun)—an old name of Perth—and the team is nicknamed the "Saints". The club was officially founded in 1884, and the team played its first match in February 1885. Their home since 1989 has been McDiarmid Park; former home venues were the Perth Recreation Grounds and, from 1924 to 1989, Muirton Park. The team's first Scottish Cup appearance was in 1886–87 and they joined the Scottish Football League in 1911–12.

Historically, St Johnstone tended to float between the top two divisions of Scottish football and gained the reputation of being a "yo-yo club". The team won the Scottish Football League First Division, then the second tier of Scottish league football, in 2008–09, bringing a return of first tier football to McDiarmid Park for the 2009–10 season after a seven-year absence. They played in the Scottish Premier League, rebranded as the Scottish Premiership in 2013, for sixteen consecutive seasons, their longest ever stay in the highest league until relegation in 2025. St Johnstone's traditional rivals are the two Dundee clubs, Dundee and Dundee United, with matches between St Johnstone and either Dundee club being called "Tayside derbies".

St Johnstone had limited success in cup competitions for the first 130 years of their history, losing at the semi-final stage on numerous occasions, as well as losing two Scottish League Cup finals. In 2014, they won their first Scottish Cup with a 2–0 win against Dundee United. In 2020–21, St Johnstone won their first League Cup and second Scottish Cup to complete a historic Cup double, becoming only the fourth team to achieve the feat. They defeated Livingston 1–0 in the League Cup final and Hibernian 1–0 in the Scottish Cup final.

They have also won the Scottish second tier eight times, the Scottish Challenge Cup in 2007, the B Division Supplementary Cup in 1949 and the Scottish Consolation Cup in 1911 and 1914. They have qualified for European competitions in seven seasons, including four consecutively from 2013 to 2016. Their highest league position in the top division is third place on three occasions: 1971, 1999 and 2013.

== History ==
=== Origins ===
Chart of yearly table positions of St Johnstone in the Scottish league.

St Johnstone FC was formed by members of a local cricket club seeking ways to occupy their time and keep fit once the cricket season had finished. The cricketers were kicking a football around the South Inch, a large public park beside the River Tay during the autumn of 1884. This is widely acknowledged to be the date of the formation of St Johnstone Football Club, although it was not until early in the following year that a group of footballers, led by John Colborn, held an official meeting that led to the formation of the football club as a separate entity rather than a 'spin-off' from the cricket club.

Football was becoming increasingly popular in Scotland and, although there were other local clubs including Fair City Athletic, Erin Rovers and Caledonian Rangers (based at Perth railway station), it was St Johnstone that became the one most associated with the town. The name is traced back to the Middle Ages when Perth was colloquially known as 'St John's Toun' (or 'Saint Johnstoun') as the church at the centre of the parish was dedicated to St John the Baptist. Agnus Dei (The Lamb of God), the symbol associated with John the Baptist, forms part of St Johnstone's club badge.

Club members leased a piece of land adjacent to the South Inch, known as the Recreation Grounds, which became St Johnstone's first home ground. After several decades – and regular problems with flooding – it became clear they had outgrown the venue and so, in 1924, they moved to the other side of Perth and built Muirton Park, which would serve as their home for the next 65 years.

=== 1886 to 1972 ===
St Johnstone made their debut appearance in the Scottish Cup in the 1886–87 tournament but were defeated 7–1 in a first round replay by the Erin Rovers club, also based in Perth, after a 3–3 draw at home. In the 1910–11 Scottish Division Two season, Port Glasgow Athletic F.C. finished next to bottom and declined to apply for re-election. They were replaced for the 1911–12 Scottish Division Two season by St Johnstone, who finished fifth in their first season with ten wins and eight defeats.

St Johnstone were promoted to the old First Division in 1924–25, by winning the Second Division title, and appointed David Taylor as team manager. They remained in the top flight until 1929–30 when they finished bottom of Division One. Two years later, under new manager Tommy Muirhead, the Saints were runners-up in Division Two to gain their second promotion. They performed well in Division One through the 1930s, reaching the semi-finals of the Scottish Cup in 1933–34 and finishing fifth in 1932–33 and 1934–35. In the final season before World War II, St Johnstone played well under manager David Rutherford to finish eighth.

The Scottish Football League suspended competition for the duration of the war but sixteen clubs were able to form a regional Southern Football League that managed to operate each season. St Johnstone were closed for most of the war and lost their top flight status as a result. The Southern Football League continued through the post-war 1945–46 season but with two divisions to incorporate clubs that were restarting, including St Johnstone. The Saints played in the 1945–46 B Division and finished sixth of fourteen clubs. When the Scottish League restarted in 1946, the Southern League set-up was used as the first post-war competition, so the A Division became the new First Division and the B Division the new Second Division. St Johnstone had lost all the ground gained in the 1930s and could only finish ninth in Division Two in 1946–47.

Jimmy Crapnell became the team manager for the 1947–48 season and was succeeded by Johnny Pattillo for 1953–54. The Saints remained in the Second Division throughout the tenures of these two managers. Bobby Brown took over in the summer of 1958 and, in his second season 1959–60, the club finally won promotion again. Brown and his successor Willie Ormond both managed Scotland after leaving St Johnstone. In 1970–71, under Ormond, Saints finished third in the league and qualified for the 1971–72 UEFA Cup.

=== Cup competitions ===
The club historically has had little success in national competitions. Prior to winning the Scottish Cup in 2014 their only cup successes were limited to successes in the Consolation Cup – a competition for clubs knocked out of early rounds of the Scottish Cup – in 1911 and 1914. The club have appeared twice in the Scottish Challenge Cup final, losing 1–0 to Stranraer in 1996, and winning the trophy in 2007 with a 3–2 victory over Dunfermline. Saints' Scottish Cup win came after seven semi-final appearances dating back to 1934. They have never won the top league. There were two appearances in the final of the League Cup, losing first to Celtic 1–0 in 1969 and 2–1 to Rangers in 1998, with Canadian internationalist Nick Dasovic scoring for Saints. In 2020–21, St Johnstone won their first League Cup and second Scottish Cup to complete a historic Cup double, becoming only the fourth team to achieve the feat. They defeated Livingston 1–0 in the League Cup final and Hibernian 1–0 in the Scottish Cup final. Defender Shaun Rooney headed the winner in both matches.

=== Willie Ormond era ===
In terms of the league, the club's highest-ever finish has been third place in the old First Division, which has occurred on three occasions. The first was in 1970–71, when Saints finished behind Celtic and Aberdeen but ahead of Rangers. The team was mostly the 1969 League Cup team, managed by Willie Ormond, who eventually went on to manage Scotland. The club had some notable players during this period, who later went on to success at other clubs, e.g. Henry Hall, Alex MacDonald, John Lambie, John Connolly, and Jim Pearson.

This third-placed finish led to a European adventure in the UEFA Cup, beating German giants Hamburger SV and Hungarians Vasas SC before finally going out in Yugoslavia to FK Željezničar Sarajevo. The club continued to play in the top division of the Scottish Football League until reconstruction in 1975, but were relegated from the new Premier Division in its first season, and turned part-time for the first time since 1961.

McDiarmid Park's south stand is named the Ormond Stand in his honour.

=== Relegations and rebuilding ===
It took Saints until 1983 to return to the top flight – albeit for a single season and as part-time team – before setting a record through suffering two successive relegations in 1984 and 1985. They eventually found themselves bottom of the entire league in 1986 and skirted with financial oblivion, before local businessman Geoff Brown stepped in.

An unprecedented change in the club's focus occurred over the next decade or so, with the move from long-term home Muirton Park to the new purpose-built McDiarmid Park on the outskirts of the city, the first purpose-built all-seater stadium built in the United Kingdom. The new stadium was named to recognise the donation of land by local farmer Bruce McDiarmid. This plus the input of significant transfer funds and the appointment of manager Alex Totten spurred Saints through the leagues. They obtained promotion to the First Division in 1988. Saints then won the First Division championship and promotion to the Premier Division in 1990 during the first season of football at McDiarmid Park. After 15 years as a semi-professional outfit, the club turned full-time again when promotion was achieved.

Saints finished 1990–91 in 7th place, but their season was buoyed by an appearance in the Scottish Cup semi-finals, in which they lost to Dundee United.

The following season proved to be Totten's last at the helm, an eighth-placed finish bringing to an end his five-year reign as manager. He was succeeded by John McClelland for the 1992–93 season. The Northern Irishman didn't fare much better, however, leading the club to 6th place. Another semi-finals cup appearance, this time the League Cup, sweetened the campaign slightly.

St Johnstone's four-year run in the Premier Division came to an end in 1993–94, a 10th-placed finish sending them back to the First Division. McClelland left the club before the season ended, and was replaced by former Dundee United striker Paul Sturrock.

=== Success in the 1990s ===
Under Sturrock's stewardship, more emphasis was placed on the club rearing its own players. This bore fruit in the form of Callum Davidson, Kieran McAnespie and Danny Griffin. Sturrock also introduced – at least in principle – the concept of morning and afternoon training sessions in an attempt to raise the fitness level of his players. In Sturrock's first full season in charge, Saints finished 5th in the First Division and reached the quarter-finals of the League Cup. In 1995–96, he led them to fourth place and a Scottish Cup quarter-final. League success returned in 1996–97 with the First Division championship and a return to the top flight. The club more than held their own in the first season back. Their 5th-placed finish meant they became founder members of the SPL the following season.

Although Sturrock soon left for Dundee United, the club found a second 'golden period' in 1998–99 under new manager Sandy Clark, when the club finished third in the SPL behind Rangers and Celtic. Saints also reached the final of the League Cup and the semi-finals of the Scottish Cup in that season, losing to Rangers in both competitions. They lost to Rangers in five of the six meetings between the two clubs that season (including a 7–0 home defeat), but Saints won 3–1 in the other game. Their finishing position in the league meant Saints had qualified for the 1999–00 UEFA Cup campaign. They started with a 3–1 aggregate win in the qualifying round over Finnish side VPS Vaasa, but were beaten 6–3 on aggregate by French giants AS Monaco in the first round proper. The return leg meant that international stars such as Fabien Barthez, John Arne Riise and David Trezeguet played at McDiarmid Park. St Johnstone remained unbeaten at home in European competitions until their tie against FC Minsk in 2013.

=== The new millennium ===
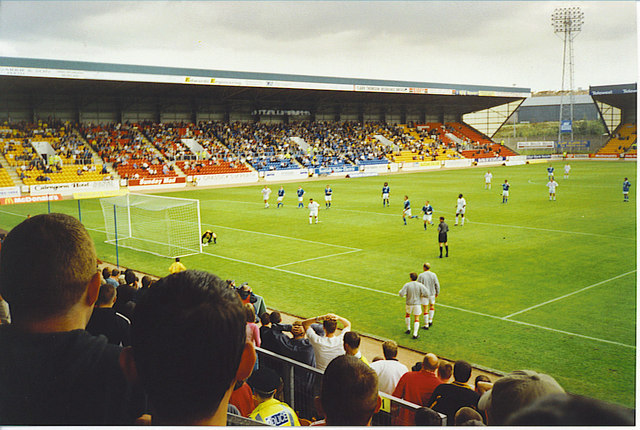
Matchday at McDiarmid Park

After a period of steady decline, the club were eventually relegated from the Premier League in 2002. Clark's replacement, Billy Stark, oversaw this relegation, and left the club in 2004 after two seasons of varying success. With the club in eighth place after a poor 2004–05 season under Stark's replacement, John Connolly, Owen Coyle took charge in April 2005, ushering in a promising new period in which St Johnstone earned second-place finishes in 2005–06 and 2006–07.

There was also cup success under Coyle. On 8 November 2006, St Johnstone beat Rangers 2–0 at Ibrox to reach the semi-finals of the League Cup. Steven Milne scored both of the goals. This was the club's first victory at Ibrox since April 1971. It was also the first time the club beat Rangers in a cup competition, and the first time that Rangers had been eliminated from a major cup competition at home by lower-division opposition. On 31 January 2007, Saints were knocked out of the League Cup at the semi-finals stage by Hibs. On 14 April 2007, St Johnstone were beaten 2–1 by Celtic at Hampden in the semi-finals of the Scottish Cup. By then Coyle's name was being linked with managerial vacancies in the SPL. On 21 April 2007, second-placed Saints won 3–0 at home to Queen of the South, while table-toppers Gretna played out a goalless draw against the visiting Clyde, which put the Perth club just one point (and seven goals) behind Gretna. As a result, the First Division championship was to be decided on the final day of the season. Seven days later, St Johnstone were pipped to the First Division championship by Gretna, who had led the division for the majority of the season. Saints won 4–3 at Hamilton Academical, but James Grady scored an injury-time winner for Gretna at Ross County minutes after the St Johnstone game had finished. The results maintained Gretna's one-point lead and they achieved promotion to the Premier League under former Saints player Davie Irons.

Owen Coyle left the club on 22 November 2007, to become manager of English club Burnley. Saints next game, the Challenge Cup Final against Dunfermline three days later, saw them win their first cup since the Scottish Consolation Cup of 1911, with a 3–2 victory. St Johnstone midfielder Derek McInnes was appointed as Coyle's replacement as manager on 27 November 2007, after Coyle's assistant, Sandy Stewart, who had been in charge in a caretaker-manager capacity for the Challenge Cup Final, decided to follow Coyle south to Burnley. McInnes began as a player-manager. Results to the end of 2007 continued the indifferent form shown under Coyle, leaving St Johnstone in third place, some way behind the leaders. In 2008 the club did, however, reach the semi-finals of the Scottish Cup for the second consecutive season, losing out to Rangers on penalties after extra time. It was the club's seventh appearance in the semi-finals, and their seventh defeat.

On 2 May 2009, Saints beat Greenock Morton 3–1 at McDiarmid Park to clinch the First Division title and a return to the Premier League after a seven-year absence. They finished eighth in their first season back.

In November 2011, on the same day the club announced the appointment of manager Steve Lomas, it was also announced that club chairman Geoff Brown, the longest-serving chairman in Scottish football, was retiring and therefore stepping down from his post. His son, Steve, was handed control of the club. In June 2013 Steve Lomas left the club to manage Millwall and Tommy Wright was appointed as his replacement. In his first competitive game in charge, Wright lead St Johnstone to a 1–0 victory against Rosenborg BK in Norway. This was the club's first away win in Europe in over 40 years.

=== The Golden Age: Tommy Wright, Callum Davidson and cup glory ===
On 13 April 2014, St Johnstone reached their first-ever Scottish Cup Final, after defeating Aberdeen 2–1 in the semi-final at Ibrox Stadium. They won the final against Tayside rivals Dundee United on 17 May, 2–0 at Celtic Park.

The club won its second major cup seven years later, defeating Livingston 1–0 in the February 2021 Scottish League Cup final. Shaun Rooney scored the only goal of the game. Later that season, St Johnstone won its second Scottish Cup, defeating Hibernian 1–0, with Shaun Rooney again scoring the only goal of the game in the 32nd minute, the same time as his winner in the League Cup Final. This victory meant St Johnstone had become the first team outside of the Old Firm to win a cup double since Aberdeen in 1990, and beating 10,000/1 odds to do so. St Johnstone also qualified for Europe for the sixth time in ten seasons, having only qualified twice before in their history.

On 14 May 2025, the club were relegated from the Scottish Premiership for the first time since 2002 after a 2–1 loss to Heart of Midlothian, coupled with Ross County's 1–1 draw with Dundee.

The Saints secured an immediate return to the top flight, winning the Championship following a 2–0 victory over Dunfermline Athletic on 21 April 2026, having been top of the league since their 5–1 opening day victory over Partick Thistle.

== Local rivals ==
St Johnstone share a Tayside rivalry with both Dundee and Dundee United. It was against the former on New Year's Day 1997 that they recorded their biggest league win in recent memory, 7–2.

== Kit suppliers and shirt sponsors ==
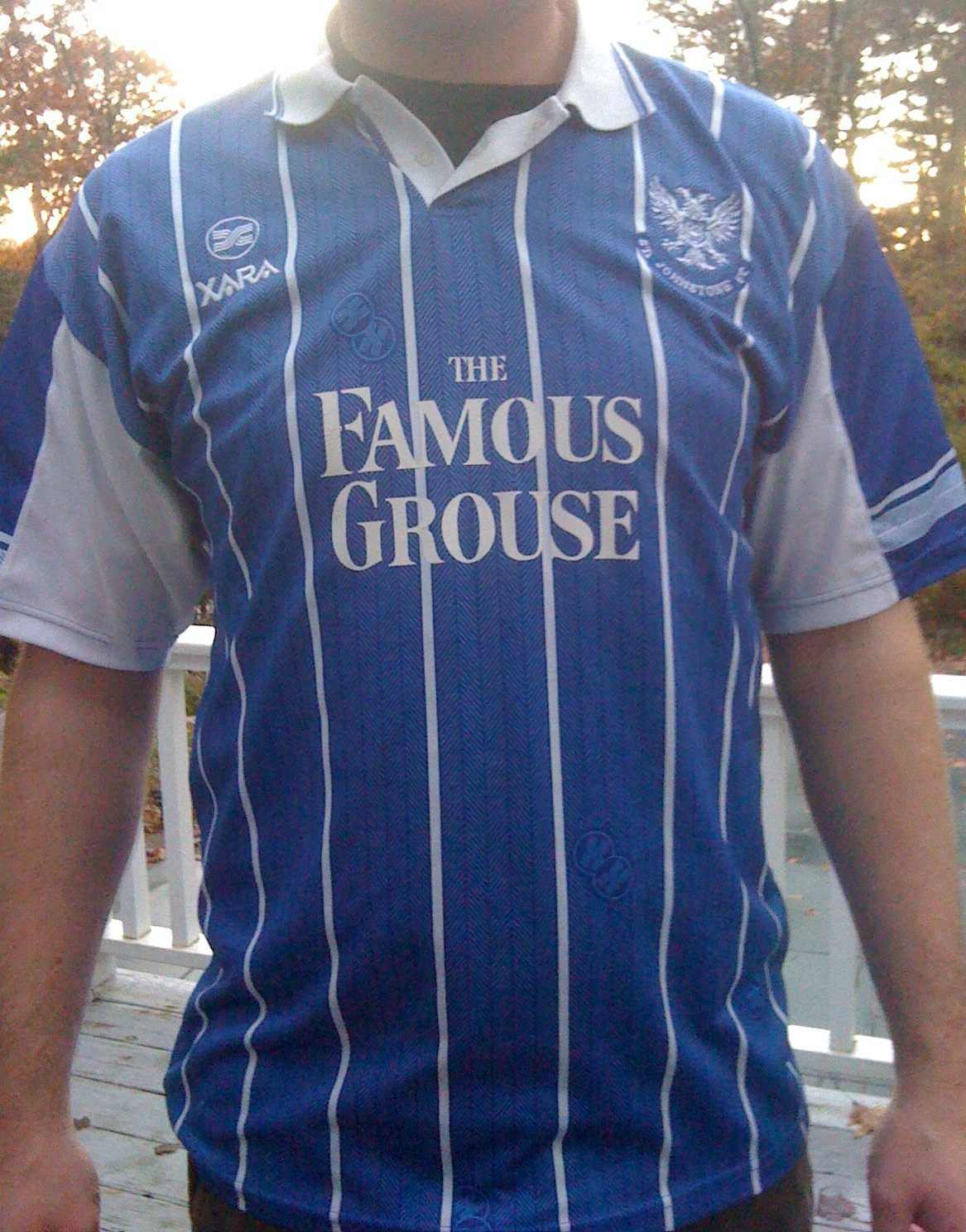
St Johnstone's kit for the 1997–98 season

Below is a list of all of St Johnstone's kit suppliers and shirt sponsors:

Period	Kit supplier	Shirt sponsor (front)	Shirt sponsor (sleeve)
1976–1977	Umbro	No sponsor	No sponsor
1977–1978	Admiral	No sponsor	No sponsor
1978–1979	Adidas	No sponsor	No sponsor
1980–1986	Umbro	No sponsor	No sponsor
1986–1989	Matchwinner	The Famous Grouse	No sponsor
1989–1991	Bukta	Bonar Textiles	No sponsor
1991–1994	Bukta	The Famous Grouse	No sponsor
1994–1997	The Saints	The Famous Grouse	No sponsor
1997–1998	Xara	The Famous Grouse	No sponsor
1998–2002	Xara	Scottish Hydro Electric	No sponsor
2002–2004	Xara	Scottish Citylink	No sponsor
2004–2006	Xara	Megabus.com	No sponsor
2006–2007	Xara	George Wimpey	No sponsor
2007–2009	Surridge	George Wimpey	No sponsor
2009–2010	Surridge	Taylor Wimpey	No sponsor
2010–2011	Joma	Taylor Wimpey	No sponsor
2011–2015	Joma	GS Brown Construction	No sponsor
2015–2016	Joma	Invest in Perth	No sponsor
2016–2018	Joma	Alan Storrar Cars	No sponsor
2018–2019	BLK	Binn Group	No sponsor
2019–2023	Macron	Binn Group	No sponsor
2023–2026	Macron	GS Brown Construction	Saints in the Community
2026–present	Puma	MandM Direct	AIIR Environmental

== Players ==
=== Current squad ===
As of 30 September 2026

Note: Flags indicate national team as defined under FIFA eligibility rules; some limited exceptions apply. Players may hold more than one non-FIFA nationality.

No.	Pos.	Nation	Player
1	GK	ENG	Toby Steward (on loan from Portsmouth)
2	DF	BIH	Enes Alić
3	DF	ENG	Cheick Diabate
4	DF	WAL	Morgan Boyes (vice-captain)
6	DF	CRO	Božo Mikulić
7	FW	SCO	Taylor Steven
8	MF	SCO	Jason Holt (captain)
9	FW	SCO	Josh Fowler
10	FW	SCO	Jamie Gullan
11	MF	SCO	Sam Stanton
14	DF	ENG	Matty Foulds
18	FW	SCO	Kai Fotheringham
19	DF	NIR	Daniel Finlayson

No.	Pos.	Nation	Player
20	GK	SCO	Ross Sinclair
22	FW	GER	Danny Schmidt
23	MF	SCO	Logan Chalmers
25	MF	SCO	Macaulay Tait
26	MF	SCO	Matty Todd
30	MF	WAL	Joel Cotterill
32	MF	SCO	Josh Campbell (on loan from Hibernian)
33	DF	SCO	Liam Smith
39	GK	SCO	Kyle Thomson
42	MF	SCO	Reece McAlear
77	FW	ESP	Unax Álvarez
99	FW	IRL	Ruari Paton

=== On loan ===
Note: Flags indicate national team as defined under FIFA eligibility rules; some limited exceptions apply. Players may hold more than one non-FIFA nationality.

No.	Pos.	Nation	Player
17	FW	WAL	Louis Lloyd (on loan at Stenhousemuir)
31	GK	SCO	Craig Hepburn (co-operation loan with Peterhead)

No.	Pos.	Nation	Player
49	MF	SCO	Jack Robertson (co-operation loan with Peterhead)
—	DF	SCO	Cole Voy (on loan at Preston Athletic)

=== Notable players ===
In October 2013, the club inducted the first five members to its "Hall of Fame" intended to formally recognise those who have made a significant contribution to the club. Those inducted were John Brogan, Joe Carr, Willie Coburn, Roddy Grant and Henry Hall. The inaugural event took place at a dinner ceremony at Perth Concert Hall.

During the 2022 FIFA World Cup, David Wotherspoon became the first St Johnstone player to appear in a World Cup match when he made a substitute appearance in the 76th minute for Canada in a group stage loss against Morocco on 1 December.

== Club staff ==
=== Directors ===
Position	Staff
Owner/Chairman	Adam Webb
Vice-chairman/CEO	Francis Smith
General manager	Roddy Grant
Director	Aileen Campbell
Director	Alisdair Dewar
Director	Matt Klase
Director	Daniel Lamb
Director	Andrew Litster
Secretary	Abby Ramsay
Life president	Geoff Brown

=== Coaching staff ===
Position	Staff
Manager	Simo Valakari
Assistant manager	Jordi Aluja
Goalkeeping coach	Paul Gallacher
Head of football operations, scouting and recruitment	Gus MacPherson
Performance manager	Paavo Valakari
Head of youth development	Paul McDonald
Head of youth phase	Gerry Creaney
U19 head coach	Danny Griffin
Club doctor	Ewen Fraser
Physiotherapist	Caitlin Wright

== Managerial history ==
St Johnstone has had 28 full-time managers in its history. The longest-serving manager was David Rutherford (11 years), although his tenure was interrupted by the Second World War. The club has, on average, appointed a new manager every 3.8 years. Willie Ormond and Bobby Brown both left "Saints" to manage the Scotland national team.

- (Scotland) Peter Grant (1919–20)
- (Scotland) James Buchan (1920–22)
- (Scotland) David Taylor (1924–31)
- (Scotland) Tommy Muirhead (1931–36)
- (Scotland) David Rutherford (1936–47)
- (Scotland) Jimmy Crapnell (1947–53)
- (Scotland) Johnny Pattillo (1953–58)
- (Scotland) Bobby Brown (1958–67)
- (Scotland) Willie Ormond (1967–73)
- (Scotland) Jackie Stewart (1973–76)
- (Scotland) Jim Storrie (1976–78)
- (Scotland) Alex Stuart (1978–80)
- (Scotland) Alex Rennie (1980–85)
- (Scotland) Ian Gibson (1985–87)
- (Scotland) Alex Totten (1987–92)
- (Northern Ireland) John McClelland (1992–93)
- (Scotland) Paul Sturrock (1 August 1993 – 5 September 1998)
- (Scotland) Sandy Clark (7 September 1998 – 25 September 2001)
- (Scotland) Billy Stark (2001–04)
- (Scotland) John Connolly (2004–05)
- (Republic of Ireland) Owen Coyle (15 April 2005 – 21 November 2007)
- (Scotland) Derek McInnes (27 November 2007 – 18 October 2011)
- (Northern Ireland) Steve Lomas (3 November 2011 – 6 June 2013)
- (Northern Ireland) Tommy Wright (10 June 2013 – 2 May 2020)
- (Scotland) Callum Davidson (1 June 2020 – 16 April 2023)
- (Scotland) Steven MacLean (27 May 2023 – 29 October 2023)
- (Scotland) Craig Levein (5 November 2023 – 17 September 2024)
- (Finland) Simo Valakari (1 October 2024 – present)

Prior to Peter Grant's appointment in 1919, the team was picked by committee – a practice in wide use at the time.

== Honours ==
=== League ===
- Scottish second-tier league titles
  - Winners (8): 1923–24, 1959–60, 1962–63, 1982–83, 1989–90, 1996–97, 2008–09, 2025–26

=== Cup ===
- Scottish Cup
  - Winners: 2013–14, 2020–21
- Scottish League Cup
  - Winners: 2020–21
- Scottish Challenge Cup
  - Winners: 2007–08
- B Division Supplementary Cup
  - Winners: 1948–49
- Scottish Consolation Cup
  - Winners: 1910–11, 1913–14

=== Doubles ===
- Scottish Cup and Scottish League Cup: 2020–21

== Statistics ==
=== Records ===
==== Team ====
- Record home attendance:
  - Recreation Grounds: 12,000 vs Clydebank (Division Two, 14 April 1923)
  - Muirton Park: 29,972 vs Dundee (Scottish Cup, 10 February 1951)
  - McDiarmid Park: 10,545 vs Dundee (Premier Division, 23 May 1999)
- Record win: 13–0 vs Tulloch (Perthshire Cup, 17 September 1887)
- Record loss: 11–1 vs Montrose (Northern League, 1 April 1893)
- Longest unbeaten sequence: 21 league matches (2008–09)
- Record transfer fee paid: £400,000 for Billy Dodds (Dundee, 1994)
- Record transfer fee received: £1,750,000 for Callum Davidson (Blackburn Rovers, 1998)

==== Individual ====
- Most capped player: Nick Dasovic – 26 caps for Canada while with the club
- Record appearances: Liam Craig – 442
- Most goals: John Brogan – 140
- Most goals in one season: Jimmy Benson – 44 (1931–32)
- Most goals in one game: Willie McIntosh – 6 (vs Albion Rovers, League Cup, 9 March 1946)

=== Average attendances ===
Past averages:

- 2019–20: 4,091
- 2018–19: 3,938
- 2017–18: 3,809
- 2016–17: 4,392
- 2015–16: 3,880
- 2014–15: 4,522
- 2013–14: 3,806
- 2012–13: 3,712
- 2011–12: 4,170
- 2010–11: 3,841
- 2009–10: 4,717
- 2008–09: 3,522
- 2007–08: 2,959
- 2006–07: 2,812
- 2005–06: 2,667
- 2004–05: 2,414

=== European record ===
St Johnstone have qualified for the UEFA Europa League (formerly the UEFA Cup) on eight occasions. The furthest they have progressed is the third round, which occurred in 1971–72, their debut season in the tournament.

Season	Competition	Round	Opponent	Home	Away	Aggregate
1971–72	UEFA Cup	First round	(West Germany) Hamburg	3–0	1–2	4–2
1971–72	UEFA Cup	Second round	(Hungary) Vasas	2–0	0–1	2–1
1971–72	UEFA Cup	Third round	(Socialist Federal Republic of Yugoslavia) Željezničar	1–0	1–5	2–5
1999–00	UEFA Cup	Qualifying round	(Finland) VPS	2–0	1–1	3–1
1999–00	UEFA Cup	First round	(France) Monaco	3–3	0–3	3–6
2012–13	UEFA Europa League	Second qualifying round	(Turkey) Eskişehirspor	1–1	0–2	1–3
2013–14	UEFA Europa League	Second qualifying round	(Norway) Rosenborg	1–1	1–0	2–1
2013–14	UEFA Europa League	Third qualifying round	(Belarus) Minsk	0–1 (aet)	1–0	1–1 (2–3 p.)
2014–15	UEFA Europa League	Second qualifying round	(Switzerland) Luzern	1–1 (aet)	1–1	2–2 (5–4 p.)
2014–15	UEFA Europa League	Third qualifying round	(Slovakia) Spartak Trnava	1–2	1–1	2–3
2015–16	UEFA Europa League	First qualifying round	(Armenia) Alashkert	2–1	0–1	2–2(a)
2017–18	UEFA Europa League	First qualifying round	(Lithuania) Trakai	1–2	0–1	1–3
2021–22	UEFA Europa League	Third qualifying round	(Turkey) Galatasaray	2−4	1–1	3–5
2021–22	UEFA Europa Conference League	Play-off round	(Austria) LASK	0–2	1–1	1–3

== Further reading/bibliography ==
- Bannerman, Gordon (1991). Saints Alive! St Johnstone Football Club Five Years on a High. Sportsprint Publishing, Edinburgh. ISBN 0-85976-346-3.
- Blair, Alastair (2003). St. Johnstone FC (Images of Sport). Tempus Publishing, Limited. pp. 128pp. ISBN 0-7524-2183-2.
- Blair A, Doyle B (1997). Bristling with Possibilities: The History of St Johnstone F.C.
- Blair A, Doyle B (2015). Manifest Destiny: The History of St Johnstone F.C.
- McLaren, G (2001). Of Saints & Foxes. G McLaren. ISBN 0-905452-99-2. The story of Sandy McLaren (St Johnstone, Leicester City and Scotland national football team goalkeeper), written by his son.
- Slater, Jim. Who's Who of St Johnstone 1946 to 1992.
