= 2026–27 Milton Keynes Dons F.C. season =

Milton Keynes Dons
2026–27 season
- Chairman: Fahad Al-Ghanim
- Head coach: Paul Warne
- Stadium: Stadium MK
- League One: 9th
- FA Cup: Second round
- EFL Cup: First round
- Top goalscorer: League: Aaron Collins (13 goals); All: Aaron Collins (17 goals)
- Highest home attendance: 16,377 vs Luton Town (17 October 2026, League One)
- Lowest home attendance: 824 vs Brentford U21 (6 October 2026, EFL Trophy GS)
- Average home league attendance: 10,955
- Biggest win: 7–1 vs Brentford U21 (H) (6 October 2026, EFL Trophy GS)
- Biggest defeat: 1–5 vs Reading (H) (10 October 2026, League One)
Home colours	Away colours	Third colours
- All statistics correct as of match played 21 November 2026.

The 2026–27 season is the 23rd season in the history of Milton Keynes Dons Football Club and their first season back in League One since the 2022–23 season following promotion from League Two in the preceding season. In addition to the domestic league, the club also participate in the FA Cup, the EFL Cup and the EFL Trophy.

== Transfers and contracts ==
=== In ===
Date	Pos.	Player	From	Fee	Ref.
1 July 2026 (Note: The transfer was announced on 5 June, and would become official on July 1 once Goode's contract at Stevenage had expired.)	CB	(England) Charlie Goode	(England) Stevenage	Free	
3 July 2026	LB	(England) Cohen Bramall	(England) Luton Town	Free	
4 July 2026	CDM	(England) Daniel Barlaser	(England) Middlesbrough	Free	
13 July 2026	CDM	(England) Ryan Wintle	(Wales) Cardiff City	Free	
24 July 2026	CF	(England) Sam Nombe	(England) Rotherham United	£600,000 (Note: With add-ons and performance-related milestones, the deal could reach as much as £1,000,000.)	
31 July 2026	LW	(Australia) Samuel Silvera	(England) Middlesbrough	Free	
26 August 2026	GK	(England) Will Dennis	(England) Bournemouth	Undisclosed	

=== Out ===
Date	Pos.	Player	To	Fee	Ref.
2 July 2026	CM	(England) Kane Thompson-Sommers	(England) Fleetwood Town	Undisclosed	
30 July 2026	GK	(England) Connal Trueman	(England) Sheffield Wednesday	Free	
13 August 2026	CM	(Republic of Ireland) Liam Kelly	(England) Peterborough United	Undisclosed	

=== Loaned in ===
Date	Pos.	Player	From	Date until	Ref.
20 August 2026	RWB	(England) Ryan Barnett	(Wales) Wrexham	End of Season	
1 September 2026	CM	(England) Ibrahim Fullah	(England) Charlton Athletic	End of Season	
1 September 2026	CB	(England) Eli Campbell	(England) Everton	End of Season	

=== Loaned out ===
Date	Pos.	Player	To	Date until	Ref.
14 August 2026	CM	(England) Will Collar	(England) Burton Albion	End of Season	
14 August 2026	CDM	(England) Keon Lewis-Burgess	(England) Gateshead	7 October 2026 (Note: Lewis-Burgess originally joined Gateshead on loan until January 2027, but was recalled by the club on 7 October 2026)	
8 September 2026	CB	(England) Charlie Waller	(England) Worthing	1 December 2026	
14 November 2026	CB	(Wales) Callum Tripp	(England) Billericay Town	14 December 2026	

=== Released / Out of Contract ===
Date	Pos.	Player	Subsequent club	Joined date	Ref.
30 June 2026	CB	(England) Luke Offord	(England) Crewe Alexandra	1 July 2026	
30 June 2026	LB	(England) Joe Tomlinson	(England) Cheltenham Town	1 July 2026	
30 June 2026	RW	(France) Aaron Nemane	(England) Rotherham United	7 July 2026	
30 June 2026	CB	(England) Laurence Maguire	(England) Rochdale	9 July 2026	
30 June 2026	CAM	(Albania) Revin Domi	(England) Royston Town	17 July 2026	
30 June 2026	CAM	(Wales) Connor Lemonheigh-Evans	(England) Northampton Town	22 July 2026	
30 June 2026	LW	(England) Ben Nash	(England) Banbury United	22 July 2026	
30 June 2026	CB	(England) Sam Sherring	(England) Rochdale	27 July 2026	
30 June 2026	RB	(Northern Ireland) Phoenix Scholtz	(England) Newport Pagnell Town	Not known	
30 June 2026	LB	(England) Marcel Guzynski	(England) Bracknell Town	15 August 2026	
30 June 2026	CF	(Northern Ireland) Michael Brammeld	(Northern Ireland) Ards	19 August 2026	
30 June 2026	RW	(England) Jonathan Leko	(Wales) Penybont	27 August 2026	
30 June 2026	CF	(Republic of Ireland) Scott Hogan	(England) Wigan Athletic	13 September 2026	
30 June 2026	GK	(England) Tom Finch			
30 June 2026	GK	(England) Lewis Sandford			
30 June 2026	CB	(England) Kobe Sinclair-Linton			
9 October 2026	RW	(Guatemala) Nathaniel Mendez-Laing			

=== New contracts ===
Date	Pos.	Player	Contract expiry	Ref.
15 May 2026	CAM	(England) Alex Gilbey	30 June 2027	
15 May 2026	CM	(Republic of Ireland) Liam Kelly	30 June 2027	
15 May 2026	GK	(Scotland) Craig MacGillivray	30 June 2027	
1 July 2026	RB	(England) Elisha Boateng	Undisclosed (Note: First professional contract)	
1 July 2026	CB	(England) Hayden Boyce	Undisclosed	
1 July 2026	CAM	(England) Brooklyn Kazungu	Undisclosed	
1 July 2026	CAM	(England) Rian Silver	Undisclosed	
1 July 2026	CAM	(England) Damerai Singh-Hurditt	Undisclosed	
24 September 2026	CB	(England) Henry Curtis	Undisclosed	
24 September 2026	CB	(England) Archie Murray	Undisclosed	
24 September 2026	CF	(New Zealand) Jack Perniskie	Undisclosed	

== Pre-season and friendlies ==
On 11 June, MK Dons announced a pre-season training camp in Pula, Croatia between 12–19 July along with a friendly against Istra 1961. A day later, the club confirmed five additional fixtures against Maidenhead United, Tottenham Hotspur, Wealdstone, Barnet and Cheltenham Town. On 30 July, an additional fixture against Kuwait SC was also announced.

Win Draw Loss Fixtures

10 July 2026 Friendly	Maidenhead United	1–4	Milton Keynes Dons	Maidenhead
19:30 BST	Pendlebury 52'	Report	Singh-Hurditt 2'; Perniskie 49'; Hepburn-Murphy 54', 76'	Stadium: York Road; Referee: Sunny Singh Gill

17 July 2026 Friendly	(Croatia) Istra 1961	2–1	Milton Keynes Dons	Pula, Croatia
19:00 CEST	Bangura 4'; Goričan 55'	Report	Mendez-Laing 59'	Stadium: Stadion Aldo Drosina; Referee: Sandi Skrletovic

22 July 2026 Friendly	Tottenham Hotspur	1–0	Milton Keynes Dons	Enfield
17:00 BST	Fernandes 3'	Report		Stadium: Hotspur Way Training Centre; Attendance: 0 (BCD); Referee: Constantine Hatzidakis

25 July 2026 Friendly	Arsenal	3–0	Milton Keynes Dons	London Colney
12:00 BST	Nelson 10'; Nwaneri 39'; O'Neill 65'	Report		Stadium: Sobha Realty Training Centre; Attendance: 0 (BCD)

25 July 2026 Friendly	Wealdstone	2–0	Milton Keynes Dons	Ruislip
15:00 BST	Obiero 34'; Trialist B 69'	Report		Stadium: Grosvenor Vale; Referee: Elliott Swallow

28 July 2026 Friendly	Barnet	0–0	Milton Keynes Dons	Edgware
19:30 BST		Report		Stadium: The Hive

31 July 2026 Friendly	Milton Keynes Dons	1–0	Kuwait SC	Milton Keynes
13:00 BST	Hepburn-Murphy 8'	Report		Stadium: Milton Keynes Dons Training Centre; Attendance: 0 (BCD)

1 August 2026 Friendly	Cheltenham Town	0–2	Milton Keynes Dons	Cheltenham
15:00 BST		Report	Mendez-Laing 46'; Collins 51'	Stadium: EV Charger Points Stadium; Attendance: 1,201; Referee: James Durkin

== Competitions ==
=== Overall record ===
Competition	First match	Last match	Starting round	Final position	Record							
Competition	First match	Last match	Starting round	Final position	Pld	W	D	L	GF	GA	GD	Win %
League One	15 August 2026	8 May 2027	Matchday 1	TBC	15	5	7	3	29	23	+6	33.33
FA Cup	7 November 2026	TBC	First round	TBC	1	1	0	0	2	1	+1	100.00
EFL Cup	8 August 2026		First round	First round	1	0	0	1	1	4	−3	0.00
EFL Trophy	22 September 2026	TBC	Group stage	TBC	3	3	0	0	13	3	+10	100.00
Total					20	9	7	4	45	31	+14	45.00

Last updated: 21 November 2026
Source: Soccerway

=== EFL League One ===
==== League table ====
Pos	Team	Pld	W	D	L	GF	GA	GD	Pts
7	Plymouth Argyle	16	7	2	7	21	24	−3	23
8	Reading	16	6	4	6	26	19	+7	22
9	Milton Keynes Dons	15	5	7	3	29	23	+6	22
10	Leicester City	14	6	4	4	23	19	+4	22
11	Cambridge United	15	5	6	4	21	24	−3	21

Updated to match(es) played on 21 November 2026. Source: EFL Official Website
Rules for classification: 1) Points; 2) Goal difference; 3) Number of goals scored; 4) Head-to-head results; 5) Wins; 6) Away goals; 7) Penalty points (sec 9.5); 8) 12-point sending off offences

==== Results summary ====
Overall								Home						Away					
Pld	W	D	L	GF	GA	GD	Pts	W	D	L	GF	GA	GD	W	D	L	GF	GA	GD
15	5	7	3	29	23	+6	22	4	3	1	21	12	+9	1	4	2	8	11	−3

Last updated: 21 November 2026.
Source: Soccerway

==== Results by round ====
Round	1	2	3	4	5	6	7	10	11	12	13	8^{1}	14	15	16	17	18	18	9^{2}	20	21	22	23	24	25	26	27	28	29	30	31
Ground	A	H	H	A	A	H	A	H	H	A	A	H	H	H	A	H	A	H	A	A	H	A	A	H	A	H	H	A	A	H	H
Result	D	D	D	L	D	D	D	L	W	L	W	W	W	W	D																
Position	9	14	15	23	18	20	22	23	18	20	18	14	11	9	9																
Points	1	2	3	3	4	5	6	6	9	9	12	15	18	21	22																

Updated to match(es) played on 21 November 2026. Source: Soccerway
A = Away; H = Home; W = Win; D = Draw; L = Loss; P = Postponed
Notes:
- ^{1} Matchday 8 (vs. Bromley) was postponed due to international call-ups.
- ^{2} Matchday 9 (vs. Barnsley) was postponed due to international call-ups.

==== Matches ====
The League One fixtures were revealed on 25 June 2026. The club will begin the season away to newly relegated Oxford United on 15 August with the final game of the regular season being at home to Bradford City on 8 May.

Win Draw Loss Fixtures

15 August 2026 1	Oxford United	2–2	Milton Keynes Dons	Oxford
12:30 BST	Harris 20', (yellow card) 90+1'; Brannagan (yellow card) 63'; Brown 90+5'	Report	Goode 29', (yellow card) 76'; Collins 34'; Ekpiteta (yellow card) 51'; Matete (yellow card) 90+4'	Stadium: The Kassam Stadium; Attendance: 10,964; Referee: Oliver Yates

22 August 2026 2	Milton Keynes Dons	1–1	Huddersfield Town	Milton Keynes
15:00 BST	Collins 54', (yellow card) 61'	Report	Taylor 9'; Radulović (yellow card) 80'; Kasumu (yellow card) 82'	Stadium: Stadium MK; Attendance: 9,505 (1,546 away); Referee: Abigail Byrne

29 August 2026 3	Milton Keynes Dons	0–0	Leicester City	Milton Keynes
12:30 BST		Report	Thomas (yellow card) 47'; Souttar (yellow card) 80'; Cullen (yellow card) 90+2'	Stadium: Stadium MK; Attendance: 16,198 (5,968 away); Referee: Thomas Parsons
Note: Fixture was initially scheduled for a 15:00 kick-off, but was brought forward for live Sky Sports coverage.

2 September 2026 4	Wigan Athletic	3–1	Milton Keynes Dons	Wigan
19:45 BST	Burns (yellow card) 8'; Weir 36', 74'; Power 48'; Costelloe (yellow card) 72'	Report	Sanders (yellow card) 18'; Gilbey (yellow card) 62'; Collins 81'	Stadium: The Brick Community Stadium; Attendance: 7,415 (314 away); Referee: Paul Howard
Note: Fixture was initially scheduled for 1 September with a 19:45 kick-off, but was moved due to a clash following the Carabao Cup Second Round draw.

5 September 2026 5	Wycombe Wanderers	3–3	Milton Keynes Dons	High Wycombe
15:00 BST	Casey 11'; Henderson 31'; Wareham 74'	Report	Gilbey (yellow card) 36'; Collins (yellow card) 41', (goal) 51'; Paterson 55'; Nelson 59'; Ekpiteta (yellow card) 84'	Stadium: Adams Park; Attendance: 5,920; Referee: Stephen Martin

12 September 2026 6	Milton Keynes Dons	1–1	Peterborough United	Milton Keynes
15:00 BST	Collins 29'; Bramall (yellow card) 80'; Gilbey (yellow card) 86'	Report	Conn-Clarke 85'	Stadium: Stadium MK; Attendance: 10,006 (2,427 away); Referee: Scott Oldham

17 September 2026 7	AFC Wimbledon	0–0	Milton Keynes Dons	Wimbledon
20:00 BST	Johnson (yellow card) 30'	Report	Paterson (yellow card) 15'; Bramall (yellow card) 56'	Stadium: The Cherry Red Records Stadium; Attendance: 7,960 (733 away); Referee: Richard Eley
Note: Fixture was initially scheduled for 19 September, but was brought forward two-days for live Sky Sports coverage.

10 October 2026 10	Milton Keynes Dons	1–5	Reading	Milton Keynes
15:00 BST	Ekpiteta (yellow card) 73'; Collins 85'	Report	Roberts (yellow card) 28'; Lane 38'; Bramall 47' (o.g.); Lisbie 64', 80'; Brown 87'	Stadium: Stadium MK; Attendance: 13,857 (2,693 away); Referee: Matthew Corlett

17 October 2026 11	Milton Keynes Dons	2–1	Luton Town	Milton Keynes
12:30 BST	Gilbey 25', (yellow card) 64'; Wintle (yellow card) 57'; Collins 79' (pen.)	Report	Clark 70'	Stadium: Stadium MK; Attendance: 16,377 (6,076 away); Referee: Martin Coy
Note: Fixture was initially scheduled for a 15:00 kick-off, but was brought forward for live Sky Sports broadcasting.

20 October 2026 12	Blackpool	2–0	Milton Keynes Dons	Blackpool
19:45 BST	Casey (yellow card) 31'; Morgan (yellow card) 65'; Anderson 69'; Taylor 77'	Report	Wintle (yellow card) 18'; Nombe (yellow card) 87'	Stadium: Bloomfield Road; Attendance: 8,104; Referee: Jamie Robinson

24 October 2026 13	Stevenage	0–1	Milton Keynes Dons	Stevenage
15:00 BST	Magennis (yellow card) 9'; Piergianni (yellow card) 35'	Report	Gilbey (yellow card) 7'; Collins (yellow card) 25'; Sanders (yellow card) 44'; Nombe 81'	Stadium: Stevenage FC Stadium; Attendance: 4,042 (980 away); Referee: Will Finnie

27 October 2026 8	Milton Keynes Dons	4–1	Bromley	Milton Keynes
19:45 GMT	Collins 40', 62'; Gilbey 71'; Goode 79'; Paterson (yellow card) 82'	Report	Pinnock 45+2'; Grant (yellow card) 70'; McKiernan (yellow card) 86'	Stadium: Stadium MK; Attendance: 6,415 (218 away); Referee: Scott Jackson
Note: Fixture was originally scheduled for 26 September, but was postponed and then rearranged due to international call-ups for the away side.

31 October 2026 14	Milton Keynes Dons	6–1	Doncaster Rovers	Milton Keynes
15:00 GMT	Collins 2', 21', 69', 76'; Crowley (yellow card) 44'; Jones (yellow card) 72'; Paterson 81'; Ekpiteta 89'	Report	Hutchinson (yellow card) 56'; Thomas 64', (yellow card) 80'; Gotts (yellow card) 88'	Stadium: Stadium MK; Attendance: 7,732 (689 away); Referee: Andrew Humphries

14 November 2026 15	Milton Keynes Dons	6–2	Burton Albion	Milton Keynes
15:00 GMT	Crowley 9'; Nombe 39', 67'; Sanders 51'; Araujo 56' (o.g.); Wiles 78'	Report	Adiele 54'; Adom 81'; Araujo (yellow card) 83'	Stadium: Stadium MK; Attendance: 7,550 (504 away); Referee: Edward Duckworth

21 November 2026 16	Mansfield Town	1–1	Milton Keynes Dons	Mansfield
15:00 GMT	Smith 45+1'; Bolton (yellow card) 90'	Report	Sanders (yellow card) 73'; Paterson 80'	Stadium: One Call Stadium; Attendance: 7,766 (562 away); Referee: Emily Heaslip

28 November 2026 17	Milton Keynes Dons	v	Notts County	Milton Keynes
12:30 GMT				Stadium: Stadium MK
Note: Fixture was initially scheduled for a 15:00 kick-off, but was brought forward for live Sky Sports broadcasting.

1 December 2026 18	Bradford City	v	Milton Keynes Dons	Bradford
19:45 GMT				Stadium: Valley Parade

12 December 2026 19	Milton Keynes Dons	v	Cambridge United	Milton Keynes
15:00 GMT				Stadium: Stadium MK

15 December 2026 9	Barnsley	v	Milton Keynes Dons	Barnsley
19:45 GMT				Stadium: Oakwell
Note: Fixture was originally scheduled for 3 October, but it was postponed due to international call-ups for the home side. It was then rearranged for 15 December.

19 December 2026 20	Stockport County	v	Milton Keynes Dons	Stockport (Edgeley)
15:00 GMT				Stadium: Edgeley Park

26 December 2026 21	Milton Keynes Dons	v	Leyton Orient	Milton Keynes
15:00 GMT				Stadium: Stadium MK

29 December 2026 22	Plymouth Argyle	v	Milton Keynes Dons	Plymouth
19:45 GMT				Stadium: Home Park

1 January 2027 23	Reading	v	Milton Keynes Dons	Reading
15:00 GMT				Stadium: Select Car Leasing Stadium

9 January 2027 24	Milton Keynes Dons	v	Stockport County	Milton Keynes
15:00 GMT				Stadium: Stadium MK

16 January 2027 25	Luton Town	v	Milton Keynes Dons	Luton
12:30 GMT				Stadium: Kenilworth Road
Note: Fixture was initially scheduled for a 15:00 kick-off, but was brought forward for live Sky Sports broadcasting.

19 January 2027 26	Milton Keynes Dons	v	Blackpool	Milton Keynes
19:45 GMT				Stadium: Stadium MK

23 January 2027 27	Milton Keynes Dons	v	Stevenage	Milton Keynes
15:00 GMT				Stadium: Stadium MK

30 January 2027 28	Doncaster Rovers	v	Milton Keynes Dons	Doncaster
15:00 GMT				Stadium: Club Doncaster Sports Village

6 February 2027 29	Leicester City	v	Milton Keynes Dons	Leicester
12:30 GMT				Stadium: King Power Stadium
Note: Fixture was initially scheduled for a 15:00 kick-off, but was brought forward for live Sky Sports broadcasting.

9 February 2027 30	Milton Keynes Dons	v	Wigan Athletic	Milton Keynes
19:45 GMT				Stadium: Stadium MK

13 February 2027 31	Milton Keynes Dons	v	Wycombe Wanderers	Milton Keynes
12:30 GMT				Stadium: Stadium MK
Note: Fixture was initially scheduled for a 15:00 kick-off, but was brought forward for live Sky Sports broadcasting.

=== FA Cup ===
The draw for the first round proper took place on 19 October 2026, with the club being drawn at home to Swindon Town of EFL League Two. In the second round, the club were drawn away at fellow League One side Wycombe Wanderers.

Win Draw Loss Fixtures

7 November 2026 First round	Milton Keynes Dons	2–1	Swindon Town	Milton Keynes
15:00 GMT	Ekpiteta 6'; Collins 13'; Sanders (yellow card) 83'; Gilbey (yellow card) 90+1'	Report	Drinan 45+1'; Munda (yellow card) 57'; Nichols (yellow card) 81'	Stadium: Stadium MK; Attendance: 3,601 (901 away); Referee: Aaron Jackson

4 December 2026 Second round	Wycombe Wanderers	v	Milton Keynes Dons	High Wycombe
19:45 GMT				Stadium: Adams Park

=== EFL Cup ===
The draw for the first round was made on 25 June 2026, with MK Dons being drawn away to EFL Championship side Norwich City.

Win Draw Loss Fixtures

8 August 2026 First round	Norwich City	4–1	Milton Keynes Dons	Norwich
15:00 BST	Touré 1'; Ben Slimane 7'; Córdoba (yellow card) 9'; Stacey (yellow card) 20'; McLean (yellow card) 34'; Chrisene 43'; Brooks 59', (yellow card) 60'	Report	Mendez-Laing (penalty missed) 55'; Wintle 56'; Goode (yellow card) 84'	Stadium: Carrow Road; Attendance: 20,066 (700 away); Referee: Elliott Swallow

=== EFL Trophy ===
==== Group stage ====
MK Dons were drawn against Bromley, Crawley Town and Brentford U21 into Southern Group H.

Pos	Div	Team	Pld	W	PW	PL	L	GF	GA	GD	Pts	Qualification
1	L1	Milton Keynes Dons	3	3	0	0	0	13	3	+10	9	Advance to Round 2
2	ACA	Brentford U21	3	2	0	0	1	4	8	−4	6	Advance to Round 2
3	L2	Crawley Town	3	1	0	0	2	6	6	0	3	
4	L1	Bromley	3	0	0	0	3	1	7	−6	0	

Source: EFL

Win Draw Loss Fixtures

22 September 2026 Group stage	Milton Keynes Dons	4–1	Crawley Town	Milton Keynes
19:00 BST	Fullah (yellow card) 22'; Matete (yellow card) 31'; Wiles 42'; Sanders 45'; Campbell 61'; Hepburn-Murphy 70' (pen.)	Report	Robertson (yellow card) 19'; Ferizaj (yellow card) 73'; Tinsdale 90+1'; Ewens-Findlay (yellow card) 90+3'	Stadium: Stadium MK; Attendance: 1,145 (108 away); Referee: Aaron Farmer

6 October 2026 Group stage	Milton Keynes Dons	7–1	Brentford U21	Milton Keynes
19:00 BST	Goode 28'; Collins 45+4', 45+13', 48'; Fullah 52'; Nombe (penalty missed) 60', 72'; Troso 78'	Report	Avenell (red card) 59'; Wheeler-Henry (yellow card) 62'; Rose (yellow card) 76'; Giscombe 89'	Stadium: Stadium MK; Attendance: 824 (116 away); Referee: Gareth Thomas

10 November 2026 Group stage	Bromley	1–2	Milton Keynes Dons	Bromley
19:30 GMT	Kabamba 22'; Saville (yellow card) 51'	Report	Paterson 27'; Burke 51', (yellow card) 55'	Stadium: CopperJax Community Stadium; Referee: Matthew Norton

== Statistics ==
=== Appearances and goals ===
As of match played 21 November 2026

Players with no appearances are not included in the list
Italics indicate a loaned in player

No.	Pos	Nat	Player	Total		League One		FA Cup		EFL Cup		EFL Trophy	
No.	Pos	Nat	Player	Apps	Goals	Apps	Goals	Apps	Goals	Apps	Goals	Apps	Goals
1	GK	(Scotland) SCO	Craig MacGillivray	7	0	5	0	1	0	1	0	0	0
2	DF	(Australia) AUS	Gethin Jones	16	0	6+6	0	0+1	0	1	0	2	0
4	MF	(England) ENG	Daniel Barlaser	14	0	6+4	0	0	0	0+1	0	2+1	0
5	DF	(England) ENG	Charlie Goode	17	3	14	2	1	0	1	0	1	1
7	MF	(England) ENG	Dan Crowley	13	1	6+4	1	1	0	0+1	0	1	0
8	MF	(England) ENG	Alex Gilbey	14	2	10+3	2	1	0	0	0	0	0
9	FW	(England) ENG	Sam Nombe	17	4	14	3	1	0	1	0	0+1	1
10	FW	(Wales) WAL	Aaron Collins	17	17	13+1	13	1	1	0+1	0	1	3
13	FW	(Scotland) SCO	Callum Paterson	15	4	5+7	3	0+1	0	1	0	1	1
15	DF	(England) ENG	Cohen Bramall	16	0	8+5	0	0+1	0	1	0	1	0
17	MF	(Australia) AUS	Samuel Silvera	15	0	7+4	0	1	0	0+1	0	2	0
19	DF	(England) ENG	Ryan Barnett	4	0	2+2	0	0	0	0	0	0	0
20	DF	(England) ENG	Eli Campbell	11	1	8	0	1	0	0	0	1+1	1
21	DF	(England) ENG	Marvin Ekpiteta	18	2	12+2	1	1	1	0+1	0	1+1	0
22	MF	(England) ENG	Ibrahim Fullah	13	1	3+6	0	0+1	0	0	0	3	1
23	GK	(England) ENG	Will Dennis	13	0	10	0	0	0	0	0	3	0
24	MF	(England) ENG	Ryan Wintle	18	1	15	0	1	0	1	1	1	0
26	MF	(England) ENG	Ben Wiles	19	2	5+9	1	0+1	0	1	0	3	1
28	MF	(England) ENG	Jay Matete	5	0	0+2	0	0	0	0+1	0	2	0
29	FW	(England) ENG	Rushian Hepburn-Murphy	2	1	0+1	0	0	0	0	0	1	1
32	DF	(England) ENG	Jack Sanders	15	2	8+3	1	1	0	0+1	0	2	1
35	DF	(England) ENG	Curtis Nelson	10	1	8	1	0	0	1	0	1	0
38	MF	(England) ENG	Keon Lewis-Burgess	1	0	0	0	0	0	0	0	1	0
39	FW	(New Zealand) NZL	Jack Perniskie	2	0	0	0	0	0	0	0	0+2	0
40	MF	(England) ENG	Rian Silver	3	0	0	0	0	0	0	0	0+3	0
41	DF	(England) ENG	Henry Curtis	1	0	0	0	0	0	0	0	0+1	0
42	DF	(England) ENG	Elisha Boateng	2	0	0	0	0	0	0	0	0+2	0
46	DF	(England) ENG	Jack Burke	3	1	0	0	0	0	0	0	2+1	1
47	MF	(England) ENG	Simone Troso	3	1	0	0	0	0	0	0	1+2	1
Player(s) who featured but departed the club permanently during the season:
6	MF	(Republic of Ireland) IRL	Liam Kelly	1	0	0	0	0	0	1	0	0	0
11	FW	(Guatemala) GUA	Nathaniel Mendez-Laing	2	0	0+1	0	0	0	1	0	0	0

=== Disciplinary record ===
As of match played 21 November 2026

List is sorted by squad number when total number of cards are equal
Players with no cards are not included in the list

No.	Pos.	Nat.	Player	League One			FA Cup			EFL Cup			EFL Trophy			Total		
No.	Pos.	Nat.	Player	Yellow card	Second yellow card	Red card	Yellow card	Second yellow card	Red card	Yellow card	Second yellow card	Red card	Yellow card	Second yellow card	Red card	Yellow card	Second yellow card	Red card
8	MF	(England)	Alex Gilbey	5	0	0	1	0	0	0	0	0	0	0	0	6	0	0
32	DF	(England)	Jack Sanders	3	0	0	1	0	0	0	0	0	0	0	0	4	0	0
10	FW	(Wales)	Aaron Collins	3	0	0	0	0	0	0	0	0	0	0	0	3	0	0
21	DF	(England)	Marvin Ekpiteta	3	0	0	0	0	0	0	0	0	0	0	0	3	0	0
5	DF	(England)	Charlie Goode	1	0	0	0	0	0	1	0	0	0	0	0	2	0	0
13	FW	(Scotland)	Callum Paterson	2	0	0	0	0	0	0	0	0	0	0	0	2	0	0
15	DF	(England)	Cohen Bramall	2	0	0	0	0	0	0	0	0	0	0	0	2	0	0
24	MF	(England)	Ryan Wintle	2	0	0	0	0	0	0	0	0	0	0	0	2	0	0
28	MF	(England)	Jay Matete	1	0	0	0	0	0	0	0	0	1	0	0	2	0	0
2	DF	(Australia)	Gethin Jones	1	0	0	0	0	0	0	0	0	0	0	0	1	0	0
7	MF	(England)	Dan Crowley	1	0	0	0	0	0	0	0	0	0	0	0	1	0	0
9	FW	(England)	Sam Nombe	1	0	0	0	0	0	0	0	0	0	0	0	1	0	0
22	MF	(England)	Ibrahim Fullah	0	0	0	0	0	0	0	0	0	1	0	0	1	0	0
46	DF	(England)	Jack Burke	0	0	0	0	0	0	0	0	0	1	0	0	1	0	0
Totals				25	0	0	2	0	0	1	0	0	3	0	0	31	0	0

=== Hat-tricks ===
As of match played 21 November 2026

Nat.	Player	Pos.	Opposition	Result	Date	Competition	Ref
(Wales)	Aaron Collins	FW	Brentford U21 (H)	7–1	6 October 2026	EFL Trophy	
(Wales)	Aaron Collins (Note: Scored four goals.)	FW	Doncaster Rovers (H)	6–1	31 October 2026	League One	

== Awards ==
=== Player Awards ===
==== EFL League One Player of the Month ====
Month	Player	Result	Ref.
October	(Wales) Aaron Collins	Won	

==== EFL League One Goal of the Month ====
Month	Player	Opposition	Result	Ref.
October	(England) Alex Gilbey	v. Luton Town	Nominated	

==== PFA League One Fans' Player of the Month ====
Month	Player	Result	Ref.
October	(Wales) Aaron Collins	Won	

=== Management Awards ===
==== EFL League One Manager of the Month ====
Month	Manager	Result	Ref.
October	(England) Paul Warne	Nominated	
