= 2023–24 Milton Keynes Dons F.C. season =

20th season in existence of Milton Keynes Dons FC

Milton Keynes Dons
2023–24 season
- Chairman: Pete Winkelman
- Head Coach: Graham Alexander (until 16 October); Mike Williamson (from 17 October)
- Stadium: Stadium MK
- League Two: 4th (qualified for play-offs)
- FA Cup: First round (eliminated by Reading)
- EFL Cup: First round (eliminated by Wycombe Wanderers)
- EFL Trophy: Round of 32 (eliminated by Brighton & Hove Albion U21)
- Top goalscorer: League: Max Dean (15); All: Max Dean (19)
- Highest home attendance: All: 11,282 vs Wrexham (20 February 2024, League Two)
- Lowest home attendance: League: 4,962 vs Grimsby Town (28 November 2023); All: 789 vs Brighton & Hove Albion U21 (5 December 2023, EFL Trophy Round of 32)
- Average home league attendance: 6,855
- Biggest win: 5–0 vs Walsall (H) (29 March 2024, League Two)
- Biggest defeat: 5–0 vs Stockport County (A) (23 March 2024, League Two)
Home colours	Away colours	Third colours
- All statistics correct as of 11 May 2024.

The 2023–24 season is the 20th season in the history of Milton Keynes Dons and their first season back in League Two since the 2018–19 season following relegation from League One the previous season. The club will also compete in the FA Cup, EFL Cup and EFL Trophy.

The season covers the period from 1 July 2023 to 30 June 2024.

== Managerial changes ==
After the departure of Mark Jackson following the conclusion of the 2022–23 season, the club appointed Graham Alexander as their new head coach. Alexander had most recently been the manager of Scottish Premiership side Motherwell.

On 16 October 2023, Alexander was sacked after a run of eight league games without a win, having taken charge of only sixteen games in all competitions since his appointment. The following day, the club named Mike Williamson as their new head coach. Williamson had most recently been the manager of National League side Gateshead.

== Current squad ==
As of 23 March 2024

No.	Name	Position	Nationality	Place of birth	Date of birth (age)	Previous club	Date signed	Fee	Contract end
Goalkeepers
31	Ronnie Sandford	GK	(England)		24 February 2005 (age 21)	Academy	1 July 2022	Trainee	30 June 2024
32	Michael Kelly	GK	(Republic of Ireland)	Leixlip	13 July 1996 (age 30)	Carlisle United	9 September 2023	Free	30 June 2024
33	Filip Marschall	GK	(England)	Cambridge	24 April 2003 (age 23)	Aston Villa	19 January 2024	Loan	31 May 2024
Defenders
2	Cameron Norman	RB	(England)	Norwich	12 October 1995 (age 31)	(Wales) Newport County	1 July 2023	Free	30 June 2025
3	Dean Lewington (captain)	LB	(England)	Kingston upon Thames	18 May 1984 (age 42)	Wimbledon	1 July 2002	Free	30 June 2024
4	Jack Tucker	CB	(England)	Whitstable	12 November 1999 (age 27)	Gillingham	1 July 2022	Undisclosed	30 June 2025
5	Warren O'Hora	CB	(Republic of Ireland)	Dublin	19 April 1999 (age 27)	Brighton & Hove Albion	18 January 2021	£200,000	30 June 2024
14	Joe Tomlinson	LB	(England)	Swindon	9 June 2000 (age 26)	Peterborough United	1 September 2023	Undisclosed	30 June 2025
21	Daniel Harvie	LB	(Scotland)	Glasgow	14 July 1998 (age 28)	(Scotland) Ayr United	27 July 2020	Undisclosed	30 June 2025
26	Anthony Stewart	CB	(England)	Brixton	18 September 1992 (age 34)	(Scotland) Aberdeen	1 September 2023	Loan	31 May 2024
29	Kyran Lofthouse	RB	(England)	Oxford	15 September 2000 (age 26)	Barnsley	9 January 2024	Loan	31 May 2024
Midfielders
6	MJ Williams	DM	(Wales)	Bangor	6 November 1995 (age 31)	Bolton Wanderers	11 July 2023	Undisclosed	30 June 2025
8	Alex Gilbey (vice-captain)	AM	(England)	Dagenham	9 December 1994 (age 31)	Charlton Athletic	1 July 2023	Free	30 June 2025
11	Jack Payne	AM	(England)	Tower Hamlets	25 October 1994 (age 32)	Charlton Athletic	30 August 2023	Loan	31 May 2024
17	Ethan Robson	CM	(England)	Houghton-le-Spring	25 October 1996 (age 30)	Blackpool	1 July 2022	Free	30 June 2024
19	Brooklyn Ilunga	LM	(England)	Croydon	21 November 2003 (age 22)	Academy	1 July 2021	Trainee	30 June 2024
24	Stephen Wearne	AM	(England)	Stockton-on-Tees	16 December 2000 (age 25)	Gateshead	6 January 2024	Undisclosed	30 June 2027
50	Lewis Bate	CM	(England)	Sidcup	28 October 2002 (age 24)	Leeds United	19 January 2024	Loan	31 May 2024
Forwards
9	Ellis Harrison	CF	(Wales)	Newport	29 January 1994 (age 32)	Port Vale	1 September 2023	Undisclosed	30 June 2025
18	Max Dean	CF	(England)	Ormskirk	21 February 2004 (age 22)	Leeds United	19 January 2023	Undisclosed	30 June 2024
22	Emre Tezgel	CF	(England)	Burton upon Trent	19 September 2005 (age 21)	Stoke City	1 February 2024	Loan	31 May 2024
27	Dan Kemp	RW	(England)	Sidcup	11 January 1999 (age 27)	Leyton Orient	31 January 2022	Undisclosed	30 June 2024
30	Matthew Dennis	CF	(England)	Hammersmith and Fulham	15 April 2002 (age 24)	Norwich City	1 July 2022	Undisclosed	30 June 2024
Out on loan
1	Craig MacGillivray	GK	(Scotland)	Perth	12 January 1993 (age 33)	Burton Albion	1 July 2023	Free	30 June 2025
7	Jonathan Leko	RW	(England)	(Democratic Republic of the Congo) Kinshasa	24 April 1999 (age 27)	Birmingham City	13 January 2023	Undisclosed	30 June 2024
10	Mohamed Eisa	CF	(Sudan)	Khartum	12 July 1994 (age 32)	Peterborough United	20 July 2021	£1,250,000	30 June 2024
12	Nathan Harness	GK	(England)		19 January 2000 (age 26)	Charlton Athletic	1 July 2023	Free	30 June 2025
16	Conor Grant	CM	(Republic of Ireland)	Dublin	23 July 2001 (age 25)	Rochdale	1 July 2022	Undisclosed	30 June 2024
20	Darragh Burns	RM	(Republic of Ireland)	Stamullen	6 August 2002 (age 24)	(Republic of Ireland) St Patrick's Athletic	4 July 2022	£150,000	30 June 2024
23	Joel Anker	AM	(England)		11 October 2004 (age 22)	Academy	1 July 2023	Trainee	30 June 2024
25	Phoenix Scholtz	RB	(Northern Ireland)		26 April 2005 (age 21)	Academy	4 August 2023	Trainee	30 June 2024
28	Dawson Devoy	AM	(Republic of Ireland)	Ashbourne	20 November 2001 (age 24)	(Republic of Ireland) Bohemian	13 July 2022	£100,000	30 June 2025
34	Callum Tripp	CM	(England)		28 August 2006 (age 20)	Academy	7 September 2023	Trainee	30 June 2024
35	Charlie Waller	CB	(England)		11 March 2005 (age 21)	Academy	1 July 2023	Trainee	30 June 2024
Left club during season
15	Tommy Smith	CB	(New Zealand)	(England) Macclesfield	31 March 1990 (age 36)	Colchester United	28 July 2023	Free	30 June 2025
22	Ashley Hunter	LW	(England)	Derby	29 September 1995 (age 31)	Morecambe	4 August 2023	Free	30 June 2025

== Transfers ==
=== In ===
Date	Pos	Player	Transferred from	Fee	Ref
1 July 2023	AM	(England) Alex Gilbey	(England) Charlton Athletic	Free Transfer	
1 July 2023	GK	(England) Nathan Harness	(England) Charlton Athletic	Free Transfer	
1 July 2023	GK	(Scotland) Craig MacGillivray	(England) Burton Albion	Free Transfer	
1 July 2023	RB	(England) Cameron Norman	(Wales) Newport County	Free Transfer	
12 July 2023	DM	(Wales) MJ Williams	(England) Bolton Wanderers	Undisclosed	
28 July 2023	CB	(New Zealand) Tommy Smith	(England) Colchester United	Free Transfer	
4 August 2023	LW	(England) Ashley Hunter	(England) Morecambe	Free Transfer	
1 September 2023	LB	(England) Joe Tomlinson	(England) Peterborough United	Undisclosed	
1 September 2023	CF	(Wales) Ellis Harrison	(England) Port Vale	Undisclosed	
9 September 2023	GK	(Republic of Ireland) Michael Kelly	(England) Carlisle United	Free Transfer	
6 January 2024	AM	(England) Stephen Wearne	(England) Gateshead	Undisclosed	

=== Out ===
Date	Pos	Player	Transferred to	Fee	Ref
22 June 2023	CF	(Northern Ireland) Will Grigg	(England) Chesterfield	Undisclosed	
30 June 2023	CB	(England) Jack Davies	(England) Banbury United	Released	
30 June 2023	CM	(Germany) Junior Gyamfi	(England) Watford U21	Released	
30 June 2023	CM	(England) Bradley Johnson	(England) Derby County	Released	
30 June 2023	LW	(England) Lewis Johnson	Free agent	Released	
30 June 2023	LW	(Sierra Leone) Sullay Kaikai	(England) Cambridge United	Released	
30 June 2023	GK	(England) David Martin	(England) Southend United	Released	
30 June 2023	CM	(England) Josh McEachran	(England) Oxford United	Released	
30 June 2023	GK	(Argentina) Franco Ravizzoli	(England) Wycombe Wanderers	Released	
30 June 2023	RB	(England) Tennai Watson	(England) Charlton Athletic	Released	
22 July 2023	CB	(England) Charlie Smith	(England) Berkhamsted	Free Transfer	
28 July 2023	CB	(Scotland) Zak Jules	(England) Exeter City	Undisclosed	
5 August 2023	DM	(Wales) Matt Smith	(Scotland) St Johnstone	Undisclosed	
24 August 2023	LW	(England) Nathan Holland	(England) Forest Green Rovers	Undisclosed	
26 January 2024	LW	(England) Ashley Hunter	(England) AFC Fylde	Mutual Consent	
6 February 2024	CB	(New Zealand) Tommy Smith	(Australia) Macarthur FC	Mutual Consent	

=== Loaned in ===
Date	Pos	Player	Loaned from	Until	Ref
30 August 2023	AM	(England) Jack Payne	(England) Charlton Athletic	End of Season	
1 September 2023	CB	(England) Anthony Stewart	(Scotland) Aberdeen	End of Season	
9 January 2024	RB	(England) Kyran Lofthouse	(England) Barnsley	End of Season	
19 January 2024	GK	(England) Filip Marschall	(England) Aston Villa	End of Season	
19 January 2024	CM	(England) Lewis Bate	(England) Leeds United	End of Season	
1 February 2024	CF	(England) Emre Tezgel	(England) Stoke City	End of Season	

=== Loaned out ===
Date	Pos	Player	Loaned to	Until	Ref
18 July 2023	RW	(England) Dan Kemp	(England) Swindon Town	1 January 2024 (Note: Kemp originally joined Swindon Town on a season-long loan, but was recalled by the club on 1 January 2024)	
12 August 2023	GK	(England) Ronnie Sandford	(England) King's Lynn Town	September 2023	
3 October 2023	CB	(England) Charlie Waller	(England) Billericay Town	31 October 2023	
25 November 2023	LM	(England) Brooklyn Ilunga	(England) Wealdstone	28 January 2024	
25 November 2023	CB	(England) Charlie Waller	(England) Banbury United	23 December 2023	
8 December 2023	RB	(Northern Ireland) Phoenix Scholtz	(England) Kettering Town	TBD	
15 December 2023	AM	(England) Joel Anker	(England) Biggleswade Town	TBD	
2 January 2024	RM	(Republic of Ireland) Darragh Burns	(Republic of Ireland) Shamrock Rovers	1 November 2024	
5 January 2024	AM	(Republic of Ireland) Dawson Devoy	(England) Swindon Town	End of Season	
18 January 2024	GK	(Scotland) Craig MacGillivray	(England) Stevenage	End of Season	
26 January 2024	RW	(England) Jonathan Leko	(England) Burton Albion	End of Season	
30 January 2024	CF	(Sudan) Mohamed Eisa	(England) Exeter City	End of Season	
2 February 2024	CM	(Republic of Ireland) Conor Grant	(England) Barnsley	End of Season	
15 March 2024	CM	(England) Callum Tripp	(England) St Albans City	End of Season	
22 March 2024	AM	(England) Joel Anker	(England) Hitchin Town	TBD	
23 March 2024	GK	(England) Nathan Harness	(England) Gateshead	End of Season	

== Pre-season and friendlies ==
The club's first pre-season friendly was announced on 1 June 2023, with an away fixture against National League side Wealdstone. A day later two more friendlies were announced, with the club facing both Coventry City and Northampton Town at Stadium MK. A fourth pre-season friendly was also announced on June 5, against Barnet.

The club also played a behind closed doors fixture whilst on a short training camp in Germany, playing newly promoted 2. Bundesliga team VfL Osnabrück.

Win Draw Loss Fixtures

11 July 2023 Friendly	Wealdstone	2–1	Milton Keynes Dons	London (Ruislip)
19:45 BST	Dyer 26'; McGregor 86'	Report	Dean 82'	Stadium: Grosvenor Vale; Referee: J Richardson

15 July 2023 Friendly	Barnet	1–1	Milton Keynes Dons	London (Canons Park)
15:00 BST	Barratt 12'	Report	Eisa 54'	Stadium: The Hive Stadium; Attendance: 902 (283 away)

21 July 2023 Friendly	VfL Osnabrück	1–0	Milton Keynes Dons	Barsinghausen, Germany
15:00 BST	Makridis 49'	Report	Dean (yellow card) 76'	Attendance: Behind closed doors

25 July 2023 Friendly	Milton Keynes Dons	1–5	Coventry City	Milton Keynes
19:00 BST	Leko 2' (pen.)	Report	Simms 43', 45'; Eccles 65'; Palmer 71'; Stretton 89'	Stadium: Stadium MK; Attendance: 4,186

29 July 2023 Friendly	Milton Keynes Dons	1–3	Northampton Town	Milton Keynes
15:00 BST	O'Hora 59'	Report	Pinnock 8'; Abimbola 87'; Fox 88'	Stadium: Stadium MK; Attendance: 3,087 (1,073 away); Referee: Alan Young

== Competitions ==
=== Overall record ===
Competition	First match	Last match	Starting round	Final position	Record							
Competition	First match	Last match	Starting round	Final position	Pld	W	D	L	GF	GA	GD	Win %
League Two	5 August 2023	27 April 2024	Matchday 1	4th	46	23	9	14	83	68	+15	50.00
FA Cup	4 November 2023		First round	First round	1	0	0	1	2	3	−1	0.00
EFL Cup	8 August 2023		First round	First round	1	0	0	1	0	2	−2	0.00
EFL Trophy	29 August 2023	5 December 2023	Group stage	Round of 32	4	3	0	1	8	7	+1	75.00
Play-offs	7 May 2024	11 May 2024	Semi final	Semi final	2	0	0	2	1	8	−7	0.00
Total					54	26	9	19	94	88	+6	48.15

Last updated: 11 May 2024
Source: Soccerway

=== EFL League Two ===
==== League table ====
Pos	Team	Pld	W	D	L	GF	GA	GD	Pts	Promotion, qualification or relegation
1	Stockport County (C, P)	46	27	11	8	96	48	+48	92	Promoted to EFL League One
2	Wrexham (P)	46	26	10	10	89	52	+37	88	Promoted to EFL League One
3	Mansfield Town (P)	46	24	14	8	90	47	+43	86	Promoted to EFL League One
4	Milton Keynes Dons	46	23	9	14	83	68	+15	78	Qualified for League Two play-offs
5	Doncaster Rovers	46	21	8	17	73	68	+5	71	Qualified for League Two play-offs
6	Crewe Alexandra	46	19	14	13	69	65	+4	71	Qualified for League Two play-offs
7	Crawley Town (O, P)	46	21	7	18	73	67	+6	70	Qualified for League Two play-offs

Source: EFL Official Website
Rules for classification: 1) Points; 2) Goal difference; 3) Number of goals scored; 4) Head-to-head results; 5) Wins; 6) Away goals; 7) Penalty points (sec 9.5); 8) 12-point sending off offences
(C) Champions; (O) Play-off winners; (P) Promoted

==== Results summary ====
Overall								Home						Away					
Pld	W	D	L	GF	GA	GD	Pts	W	D	L	GF	GA	GD	W	D	L	GF	GA	GD
46	23	9	14	83	68	+15	78	14	5	4	47	26	+21	9	4	10	36	42	−6

Last updated: 27 April 2024.
Source: Soccerway

==== Results by round ====
Round	1	2	3	4	5	6	7	8	9	10	11	12	13	14	15	16	17	19	20	22	23	24	25	26	28	29	18^{1}	30	31	32	33	34	27^{3}	35	36	21^{2}	37	38	39	40	41	42	43	44	45	46
Ground	A	H	A	A	H	A	H	H	A	H	A	A	H	A	H	H	A	A	H	H	A	H	H	A	A	H	H	H	A	H	A	A	H	H	A	A	H	A	H	A	H	A	A	H	A	H
Result	W	W	L	W	W	L	D	L	D	L	D	L	D	L	W	W	D	W	D	W	W	W	W	L	W	L	W	W	L	W	L	W	D	W	L	W	W	L	W	L	W	D	W	L	W	D
Position	3	1	4	2	1	2	4	9	10	11	11	16	16	18	16	12	13	13	11	11	9	7	6	8	7	7	6	6	6	6	6	5	5	5	5	5	4	5	4	4	4	4	3	4	4	4
Points	3	6	6	9	12	12	13	13	14	14	15	15	16	16	19	22	23	26	27	30	33	36	39	39	42	42	45	48	48	51	51	54	55	58	58	61	64	64	67	67	70	71	74	74	77	78

Updated to match(es) played on 27 April 2024. Source: Soccerway
A = Away; H = Home; W = Win; D = Draw; L = Loss; P = Postponed
Notes:
- ^{1} Matchday 18 (vs AFC Wimbledon) was postponed due to international call-ups.
- ^{2} Matchday 21 (vs Mansfield Town) was postponed due to a waterlogged pitch.
- ^{3} Matchday 27 (vs Wrexham) was postponed due to Wrexham's FA Cup involvement.

==== Matches ====
The league fixtures for the 2023–24 season were announced on 22 June 2023. The club's opening game of the season will be away to newly promoted Wrexham on 5 August 2023 with the final game of the season being at home to Sutton United on 27 April 2024.

Win Draw Loss Fixtures

5 August 2023 1	Wrexham	3–5	Milton Keynes Dons	Wrexham
15:00 BST	O'Connell (yellow card) 11'; Lee (yellow card) 23'; Mendy 42'; Davies 82'; Forde 90+6'	Report	O'Connell 6' (o.g.); Eisa 10', (yellow card) 11'; Leko 51', 64'; Norman (yellow card) 68'; MacGillivray (yellow card) 84'; Harvie 90+4'	Stadium: STōK Racecourse; Attendance: 10,205 (1,115 away); Referee: Tom Reeves

12 August 2023 2	Milton Keynes Dons	1–0	Tranmere Rovers	Milton Keynes
15:00 BST	Eisa 7', (yellow card) 37'; MacGillivray (yellow card) 77'	Report	Davies (yellow card) 27'	Stadium: Stadium MK; Attendance: 5,831 (819 away); Referee: Sunny Singh Gill

15 August 2023 3	Crawley Town	2–1	Milton Keynes Dons	Crawley
19:45 BST	Tsaroulla 16'; Orsi 52'; Williams (yellow card) 90+8'	Report	Eisa 27'; Robson (yellow card) 65'; Hunter (yellow card) 90+8'	Stadium: Broadfield Stadium; Attendance: 3,282 (505 away); Referee: Daniel Middleton

19 August 2023 4	Colchester United	2–3	Milton Keynes Dons	Colchester
15:00 BST	Taylor 10', 14'; Ihionvien (yellow card) 42'; Fevrier (yellow card) 45+2'; Chilvers (yellow card) 67'; Tchamadeu (yellow card) 81'; Egbo (yellow card) 85'	Report	Eisa 8', (yellow card) 45+5'; Harvie (yellow card) 82'; Gilbey (yellow card) 84', (goal) 88'; Grant (yellow card) 90+6'; Dennis 90+9'	Stadium: JobServe Community Stadium; Attendance: 3,857 (569 away); Referee: Carl Brook

26 August 2023 5	Milton Keynes Dons	2–1	Doncaster Rovers	Milton Keynes
15:00 BST	Harvie 16'; Smith (yellow card) 25'; O'Hora 33'	Report	Senior (yellow card) 42'; Molyneux 56'	Stadium: Stadium MK; Attendance: 5,697 (535 away); Referee: Andrew Kitchen

2 September 2023 6	Crewe Alexandra	3–1	Milton Keynes Dons	Crewe
15:00 BST	Thomas (yellow card) 55', (goal) 62'; Baker-Richardson 69'; O'Riordan (yellow card) 90'; Long 90'; Rowe (yellow card) 90+2'; Davies (yellow card) 90+3'	Report	Leko 8'; Gilbey (yellow card) 75'	Stadium: Mornflake Stadium; Attendance: 3,927 (505 away); Referee: Peter Wright

9 September 2023 7	Milton Keynes Dons	1–1	Notts County	Milton Keynes
15:00 BST	Harvie 46'; Smith (yellow card) 90+1'	Report	Cameron 66'	Stadium: Stadium MK; Attendance: 8,011 (2,762 away); Referee: Chris Kavanagh

16 September 2023 8	Milton Keynes Dons	1–2	Stockport County	Milton Keynes
15:00 BST	Eisa 26'; Robson (yellow card) 58'; Smith (yellow card) 62'; Gilbey (yellow card) 72'; Harvie (yellow card) 83'	Report	Barry 17', (yellow card) 75'; Powell 45+2'; Pye (yellow card) 88'	Stadium: Stadium MK; Attendance: 7,085 (1,064 away); Referee: Edward Duckworth

23 September 2023 9	Sutton United	1–1	Milton Keynes Dons	London (Sutton)
15:00 BST	Sowunmi 37'	Report	Gilbey 53'; Williams (yellow card) 71'	Stadium: VBS Community Stadium; Attendance: 3,288 (691 away); Referee: Thomas Kirk

30 September 2023 10	Milton Keynes Dons	0–1	Harrogate Town	Milton Keynes
15:00 BST	Williams (yellow card) 54'; Ilunga (yellow card) 90+5'; Dean (yellow card) 90+6'	Report	O'Hora 41' (o.g.); Oxley (yellow card) 43'	Stadium: Stadium MK; Attendance: 5,251 (138 away); Referee: Martin Coy

3 October 2023 11	Walsall	0–0	Milton Keynes Dons	Walsall
19:45 BST	McEntee (yellow card) 24'; Hutchinson (yellow card) 41'; Williams (yellow card) 53'	Report	Harrison (yellow card) 24'; Gilbey (yellow card) 66'; Norman (yellow card) 67'	Stadium: Poundland Bescot Stadium; Attendance: 4,515 (245 away); Referee: Chris Pollard

7 October 2023 12	Gillingham	2–1	Milton Keynes Dons	Gillingham
15:00 BST	Bonne 26'; Malone (yellow card) 35', (goal) 55'; Turner (yellow card) 73'	Report	Williams (yellow card) 58'; Harvie (yellow card) 62' (yellow-red card) 90+2'; Dean (yellow card) 81'; Harrison 82'; Stewart (yellow card) 90'	Stadium: MEMS Priestfield Stadium; Attendance: 6,119 (323 away); Referee: Darren Drysdale

14 October 2023 13	Milton Keynes Dons	2–2	Barrow	Milton Keynes
15:00 BST	Robson (yellow card) 6'; Dean 12', 35'; Norman (yellow card) 49'	Report	Gotts (yellow card) 45+1'; Whitfield 90+3'; Acquah 90+5'	Stadium: Stadium MK; Attendance: 5,725 (278 away); Referee: Will Finnie

21 October 2023 14	Accrington Stanley	1–0	Milton Keynes Dons	Accrington
15:00 BST	Whalley 32', (yellow card) 61'; Woods (yellow card) 41'	Report	Harvie (yellow card) 56'	Stadium: Wham Stadium; Attendance: 1,995 (208 away); Referee: Simon Mather

24 October 2023 15	Milton Keynes Dons	4–1	Bradford City	Milton Keynes
19:45 BST	Tomlinson 4'; Payne 31'; Dean 59'; Gilbey 90'	Report	Gilliead 17'; Taylor (yellow card) 30'; McDonald (yellow card) 39'; Ridehalgh (yellow card) 52'; Stubbs (yellow card) 70'	Stadium: Stadium MK; Attendance: 5,510 (780 away); Referee: Matthew Corlett

28 October 2023 16	Milton Keynes Dons	3–2	Swindon Town	Milton Keynes
15:00 BST	Grant (yellow card) 27'; Dean 39'; Harvie (yellow card) 54'; O'Hora 66'; McEachran 84' (o.g.); Eisa (yellow card) 90+6'	Report	Clayton (yellow card) 29'; Khan (yellow card) 37'; McEachran (yellow card) 53'; Young 59'; Austin (yellow card) 86'; Blake-Tracy 90+4'	Stadium: Stadium MK; Attendance: 7,821 (2,595 away); Referee: Ross Joyce

11 November 2023 17	Newport County	0–0	Milton Keynes Dons	Newport
15:00 GMT	Bogle (yellow card) 15'; Evans (yellow card) 45+2'	Report	Norman (yellow card) 67'; Payne (yellow card) 90+5'	Stadium: Rodney Parade; Attendance: 3,777 (345 away); Referee: Ben Atkinson

25 November 2023 19	Salford City	2–4	Milton Keynes Dons	Salford
15:00 GMT	Lund (yellow card) 33'; N'Mai 36'; Watson 45+2' (pen.); Mariappa (yellow card) 64'	Report	Dean 10'; Tomlinson 50', 72', (yellow card) 73'; Williams (yellow card) 67'; Harrison 88'	Stadium: Peninsula Stadium; Attendance: 2,508 (440 away); Referee: Scott Jackson

28 November 2023 20	Milton Keynes Dons	1–1	Grimsby Town	Milton Keynes
19:45 GMT	Williams (yellow card) 45+7'; Payne 66'	Report	Pyke 20'; Conteh (yellow card) 64'; Ainley (yellow card) 85'; Wilson (yellow card) 90'	Stadium: Stadium MK; Attendance: 4,962 (610 away); Referee: Peter Wright

16 December 2023 22	Milton Keynes Dons	2–0	Forest Green Rovers	Milton Keynes
15:00 GMT	Dean 21', (yellow card) 53'; Payne 35'; Norman (yellow card) 44'; E Robson (yellow card) 57'; Harvie (yellow card) 89'	Report	Jones (yellow card) 2'; J Robson (yellow card) 53'; Inniss (yellow card) 75'; Moore-Taylor (yellow card) 90'	Stadium: Stadium MK; Attendance: 6,033 (171 away); Referee: Seb Stockbridge

23 December 2023 23	Morecambe	1–3	Milton Keynes Dons	Morecambe
15:00 GMT	Connolly (yellow card) 27'; McKiernan 49', (yellow card) 52'; Slew (yellow card) 90+6'		Dean 31', 90+7'; Williams (yellow card) 41'; Tomlinson 69'	Stadium: Mazuma Mobile Stadium; Attendance: 4,551 (183 away); Referee: Lewis Smith

26 December 2023 24	Milton Keynes Dons	1–0	Colchester United	Milton Keynes
15:00 GMT	Williams (yellow card) 48'; Payne (yellow card) 55'; Dean (yellow card) 83'; Harrison 89'	Report	Read (yellow card) 66'	Stadium: Stadium MK; Attendance: 6,335 (552 away); Referee: Alex Chilowicz

29 December 2023 25	Milton Keynes Dons	2–0	Crawley Town	Milton Keynes
19:45 GMT	Tomlinson 2'; Dean (yellow card) 17'; Grant (yellow card) 18'; Gilbey (yellow card) 61', (goal) 82'	Report	Maguire (yellow card) 8' (yellow-red card) 85'	Stadium: Stadium MK; Attendance: 5,945 (380 away); Referee: Ross Joyce

1 January 2024 26	Doncaster Rovers	3–0	Milton Keynes Dons	Doncaster
15:00 GMT	Molyneux 8', (yellow card) 22'; Ironside 14'; Senior (yellow card) 32'; Rowe 43'	Report	Eisa (yellow card) 45+3'; Dean (yellow card) 74'; Lewington (yellow card) 76'; Robson (yellow card) 90+5'	Stadium: Eco-Power Stadium; Attendance: 6,151 (517 away); Referee: Thomas Parsons

13 January 2024 28	Tranmere Rovers	1–2	Milton Keynes Dons	Birkenhead
15:00 GMT	Morris 12'; Apter (yellow card) 45+2'	Report	Gilbey 9'; Harrison 90+7'	Stadium: Prenton Park; Attendance: 6,861 (344 away); Referee: Darren Drysdale

20 January 2024 29	Milton Keynes Dons	1–2	Morecambe	Milton Keynes
15:00 GMT	Dean 2', (yellow card) 10'; Tomlinson (yellow card) 21'	Report	Bedeau (yellow card) 35'; Slew 51'; Brown 90+2', (yellow card) 90+6'; Stokes (yellow card) 90+8'	Stadium: Stadium MK; Attendance: 6,099 (193 away); Referee: Marc Edwards

23 January 2024 18	Milton Keynes Dons	3–1	AFC Wimbledon	Milton Keynes
19:45 GMT	Kemp 10'; Johnson 16' (o.g.); O'Hora 22'; Payne (yellow card) 79'	Report	Little 53'; Tilley (yellow card) 56'; Biler (red card) 65'; Kalambayi (red card) 73'	Stadium: Stadium MK; Attendance: 6,278 (651 away); Referee: Sunny Singh Gill
Note: Fixture was originally scheduled for 18 November, but was postponed because of international call-ups.

27 January 2024 30	Milton Keynes Dons	2–1	Gillingham	Milton Keynes
15:00 GMT	Payne (yellow card) 69'; Williams 79'; Gilbey 88'	Report	Walker 90'	Stadium: Stadium MK; Attendance: 6,723 (1,380 away); Referee: Carl Brook

3 February 2024 31	Barrow	1–0	Milton Keynes Dons	Barrow-in-Furness
15:00 GMT	Canavan (yellow card) 38'; Ray (yellow card) 55'; Stockton 78'; Farman (yellow card) 90+6'	Report	Williams (yellow card) 51'; Tomlinson (yellow card) 53'	Stadium: SO Legal Stadium; Attendance: 3,501 (275 away); Referee: Tom Reeves

10 February 2024 32	Milton Keynes Dons	2–1	Accrington Stanley	Milton Keynes
15:00 GMT	Payne 71', (yellow card) 77'; Tomlinson 90+3'	Report	Nolan 11', (yellow card) 90'; Gubbins (yellow card) 29'; Martin (yellow card) 34'; Conneely (yellow card) 58'; Woods (yellow card) 65'; O'Brien (yellow card) 79'	Stadium: Stadium MK; Attendance: 5,508 (102 away); Referee: Declan Bourne

13 February 2024 33	Bradford City	4–0	Milton Keynes Dons	Bradford
19:45 GMT	Platt 14'; Kavanagh 36'; McDonald (yellow card) 44'; Gilliead (yellow card) 45+3'; Cook 49', (yellow card) 76'; Oduor 51'; Smallwood (yellow card) 59'; Tomkinson (yellow card) 71'	Report	Robson (yellow card) 90'	Stadium: University of Bradford Stadium; Attendance: 16,234; Referee: Ollie Yates

17 February 2024 34	Swindon Town	1–2	Milton Keynes Dons	Swindon
15:00 GMT	Khan (yellow card) 45'; McKirdy (yellow card) 75'; Austin 89'	Report	Wearne 4', 8'; Bate (yellow card) 29'	Stadium: The County Ground; Attendance: 8,789 (697 away); Referee: Scott Tallis

20 February 2024 27	Milton Keynes Dons	1–1	Wrexham	Milton Keynes
19:45 GMT	Kemp 26'; Lewington (red card) 60'; Harvie (yellow card) 82'; Gilbey (yellow card) 90+5'; O'Hora (yellow card) 90+8'	Report	McClean 22'; Boyle (yellow card) 49' (yellow-red card) 77'; O'Connell (yellow card) 62'	Stadium: Stadium MK; Attendance: 11,282 (1,436 away); Referee: Sam Purkiss
Note: Fixture was originally scheduled for 6 January, but was postponed due to Wrexham's involvement in the FA Cup third round.

24 February 2024 35	Milton Keynes Dons	3–0	Newport County	Milton Keynes
15:00 GMT	Kemp 12'; Payne 23'; Gilbey 29', (yellow card) 83'; Tomlinson (yellow card) 88'	Report	Wildig (yellow card) 25'; Morris (yellow card) 31'; Evans (yellow card) 85'	Stadium: Stadium MK; Attendance: 6,354 (512 away); Referee: Ben Atkinson

2 March 2024 36	AFC Wimbledon	1–0	Milton Keynes Dons	London (Wimbledon)
12:30 GMT	Little (yellow card) 28'; Kelly (yellow card) 36'; Bugiel (yellow card) 77'; Reeves (yellow card) 85'; O'Toole (yellow card) 90+2'; Curtis 90+4', (yellow card) 90+5'	Report	Kelly (yellow card) 4'; Wearne (yellow card) 29'; Harvie (yellow card) 55'; Lofthouse (yellow card) 56'; Gilbey (yellow card) 65'; Norman (yellow card) 87'	Stadium: The Cherry Red Records Stadium; Attendance: 8,182; Referee: Charles Breakspear
Note: Fixture was originally given a 15:00 kick-off, but was brought forward to 12:30.

5 March 2024 21	Mansfield Town	1–2	Milton Keynes Dons	Mansfield
19:45 GMT	Akins (penalty missed) 15'; Quinn 15'; Cargill (yellow card) 45+2'; Boateng (yellow card) 85'	Report	Gilbey 20'; Dennis (yellow card) 50', (goal) 54'	Stadium: One Call Stadium; Attendance: 7,414 (370 away); Referee: Lee Swabey
Note: Fixture was originally scheduled for 9 December, but was postponed due to a waterlogged pitch.

9 March 2024 37	Milton Keynes Dons	3–1	Salford City	Milton Keynes
15:00 GMT	Lofthouse 27'; Gilbey 31'; Tezgel 45+7'; Harrison (yellow card) 74'; Bate (yellow card) 74'	Report	Smith 12', (yellow card) 54'; McLennan (yellow card) 20'; McAleny (yellow card) 71'; Vassell (yellow card) 74'; Lund (yellow card) 82'	Stadium: Stadium MK; Attendance: 6,544 (187 away); Referee: Dean Whitestone

12 March 2024 38	Grimsby Town	1–0	Milton Keynes Dons	Cleethorpes
19:45 GMT	Gnahoua (yellow card) 10'; Mullarkey (yellow card) 16'; Obikwu 33'; Holohan (yellow card) 44', (penalty missed) 45+2'; Hume (yellow card) 73'; Thompson (yellow card) 90'	Report		Stadium: Blundell Park; Attendance: 5,659 (153 away); Referee: Aaron Bannister

16 March 2024 39	Milton Keynes Dons	3–1	Crewe Alexandra	Milton Keynes
15:00 GMT	Dennis 5', 22'; Wearne 25'; Bate (yellow card) 62'; Kemp (yellow card) 70'; Tomlinson (yellow card) 72'	Report	Nevitt 19'; Turns (yellow card) 38'; Cooney (yellow card) 72'	Stadium: Stadium MK; Attendance: 6,661 (719 away); Referee: Paul Howard

23 March 2024 40	Stockport County	5–0	Milton Keynes Dons	Stockport
17:15 GMT	Camps 31'; Madden 36'; Kane (yellow card) 44'; Olaofe 45+1'; Lemonheigh-Evans 51'; Byrne 90+5'	Report	Payne (yellow card) 39'	Stadium: Edgeley Park; Attendance: 9,727 (568 away); Referee: Marc Edwards
Note: Fixture was originally scheduled to kick-off at 15:00, but was moved back for live Sky Sports coverage.

29 March 2024 41	Milton Keynes Dons	5–0	Walsall	Milton Keynes
15:00 GMT	Tezgel 28'; Dean 59' (pen.), 78'; Gilbey 62'; Tomlinson 74'	Report	Gordon (yellow card) 68'; Adegboyega (yellow card) 81'	Stadium: Stadium MK; Attendance: 8,121 (1,513 away); Referee: Edward Duckworth

1 April 2024 42	Notts County	3–3	Milton Keynes Dons	Nottingham
15:00 BST	Austin 45+4'; Jatta 48'; Langstaff (yellow card) 58'; Nemane 90+1'; Robertson (yellow card) 90+6'	Report	Dean 18'; Bate (yellow card) 39'; Norman (yellow card) 39'; Harrison 64', 83'; Harvie (yellow card) 90+7'	Stadium: Meadow Lane; Attendance: 10,439 (1,168 away); Referee: Scott Simpson

6 April 2024 43	Forest Green Rovers	0–2	Milton Keynes Dons	Nailsworth
15:00 BST	Moore-Taylor (yellow card) 44'; McCann (yellow card) 61'	Report	Dean 40'; Gilbey 51'; Tezgel (yellow card) 90+4'	Stadium: The Bolt New Lawn; Attendance: 2,507 (571 away); Referee: Andy Davies

13 April 2024 44	Milton Keynes Dons	1–4	Mansfield Town	Milton Keynes
15:00 BST	Dean 13', (yellow card) 54'; Gilbey (yellow card) 89'; Harvie (yellow card) 90'	Report	Swan (yellow card) 27'; Hewitt 30'; Clarke (yellow card) 32'; Keillor-Dunn 51', 90'; Williams (yellow card) 69'; Boateng (yellow card) 84'; Lewis (yellow card) 88'; Gale 90+2'	Stadium: Stadium MK; Attendance: 11,212 (3,653 away); Referee: Ben Speedie

20 April 2024 45	Harrogate Town	3–5	Milton Keynes Dons	Harrogate
15:00 BST	Odoh 33'; Thomson 45+2', 50'	Report	Gilbey 40'; Dean 43'; Wearne 52'; Tezgel 80'; Harrison 83'	Stadium: The EnviroVent Stadium; Attendance: 3,572 (573 away); Referee: David Webb

27 April 2024 46	Milton Keynes Dons	4–4	Sutton United	Milton Keynes
15:00 BST	Payne 14'; Gilbey 41'; Tezgel 60'; O'Hora (yellow card) 67'; Harrison 70', (yellow card) 90+6'	Report	Duke-McKenna 50', 75'; Lakin 62'; Eastmond (yellow card) 65'; Hart (yellow card) 67'; Smith 90+1'	Stadium: Stadium MK; Attendance: 8,685 (860 away); Referee: Thomas Parsons

==== Play-offs ====
The club finished the regular season in fourth place in the league table and met Crawley Town, the team that finished seventh, over two legs in the play-offs. The first leg took place at Broadfield Stadium with the second leg at Stadium MK.

The first leg was due to take place on 6 May, but was postponed until the following day due to a waterlogged pitch. As a result the second leg, originally scheduled for 9 May, was rescheduled to 11 May.

7 May 2024 Semi-final Leg 1	Crawley Town	3–0	Milton Keynes Dons	Crawley
19:30 BST	Kelly 5'; Williams 45+1'; Maguire (yellow card) 51'; Darcy 65'; Conroy (yellow card) 66'; Gordon (yellow card) 90+3'	Report	Tomlinson (yellow card) 41'; Bate (yellow card) 45'; Harvie (yellow card) 57'	Stadium: Broadfield Stadium; Attendance: 5,564 (575 away); Referee: Ross Joyce
Note: Fixture live on Sky Sports

11 May 2024 Semi-final Leg 2	Milton Keynes Dons	1–5 (1–8 agg.)	Crawley Town	Milton Keynes
19:45 BST	Dean 45+1', (penalty missed) 67', (yellow card) 90+5'; Tucker (yellow card) 63'; Williams (yellow card) 83'	Report	Williams 3', (yellow card) 61'; Orsi 30', 48', 90+2'; Lolos (yellow card) 40'; Roles 80'	Stadium: Stadium MK; Attendance: 10,053 (1,630 away); Referee: Seb Stockbridge
Note: Fixture live on Sky Sports

=== FA Cup ===
In the first round proper, the club were drawn away to Reading.

Win Draw Loss Fixtures

4 November 2023 First round	Reading	3–2	Milton Keynes Dons	Reading
15:00 GMT	Ehibhatiomhan 3'; Elliott (yellow card) 28'; Hutchinson (yellow card) 49'; Knibbs 64', (yellow card) 77'; Wing 68'	Report	Gilbey 39'; Dean 90+3', (yellow card) 90+4'	Stadium: Select Car Leasing Stadium; Attendance: 4,325 (635 away); Referee: Thomas Kirk

=== EFL Cup ===
The club were drawn at home to Wycombe Wanderers in the first round.

Win Draw Loss Fixtures

8 August 2023 First round	Milton Keynes Dons	0–2	Wycombe Wanderers	Milton Keynes
19:45 BST	Hunter (yellow card) 15'; O'Hora (yellow card) 30'	Report	Tafazolli (yellow card) 37'; Hanlan 73'; Forino-Joseph 82'	Stadium: Stadium MK; Attendance: 2,946 (635 away); Referee: James Bell

=== EFL Trophy ===
In the group stage draw, MK Dons were drawn into Southern Group F alongside Northampton Town, Oxford United and Chelsea U21s.

After topping the group, the club were drawn at home to Brighton & Hove Albion U21s in the Round of 32 draw.

==== Group stage ====
Pos	Div	Team	Pld	W	PW	PL	L	GF	GA	GD	Pts	Qualification
1	L2	Milton Keynes Dons	3	3	0	0	0	8	3	+5	9	Advance to Round 2
2	L1	Oxford United	3	2	0	0	1	8	2	+6	6	Advance to Round 2
3	ACA	Chelsea U21	3	0	1	0	2	3	11	−8	2	
4	L1	Northampton Town	3	0	0	1	2	5	8	−3	1	

Updated to match(es) played on 7 November 2023. Source: EFL.com

Win Draw Loss Fixtures

29 August 2023 Group stage	Milton Keynes Dons	4–1	Chelsea U21	Milton Keynes
19:00 BST	Dennis 9'; Scholtz (yellow card) 14'; Leko 56', (yellow card) 68'; Devoy (yellow card) 60'; Hunter (yellow card) 66'; Dean 70', 79'	Report	Morgan 32'; McNeilly (yellow card) 82'; Boniface (yellow card) 90+4'	Stadium: Stadium MK; Attendance: 1,704 (284 away); Referee: Jacob Miles

19 September 2023 Group stage	Oxford United	0–1	Milton Keynes Dons	Oxford
19:00 BST	McEachran (yellow card) 49'	Report	Stewart (yellow card) 4'; Tomlinson (yellow card) 39'; Lewington (yellow card) 45'; Payne 56' (pen.); Tripp (yellow card) 67'; Harvie (yellow card) 69'	Stadium: Kassam Stadium; Attendance: 1,588 (143 away); Referee: Alan Young

21 November 2023 Group stage	Milton Keynes Dons	3–2	Northampton Town	Milton Keynes
19:00 GMT	Waller 56'; Burns 64'; Devoy 83'	Report	Simpson (yellow card) 28', (goal) 82' (pen.); Monthé 36'; Hondermarck (yellow card) 85'	Stadium: Stadium MK; Attendance: 1,648 (427 away); Referee: Sam Purkiss

==== Knockout stages ====
5 December 2023 Round of 32	Milton Keynes Dons	0–4	Brighton & Hove Albion U21	Milton Keynes
19:00 GMT	Devoy (red card) 78'	Report	Chouchane 50' (pen.); Knight 68'; Duffus (yellow card) 72'; McConville 89'; Bashir 90+2'	Stadium: Stadium MK; Attendance: 789 (55 away); Referee: Neil Hair

== Club statistics ==
=== Goalscorers ===
Correct as of match played on 11 May 2024

Note: The list is sorted by surname when total goals are equal.

Rank	No.	Pos.	Player	League Two	FA Cup	EFL Cup	EFL Trophy	Play-offs	Total
1	18	FW	(England) Max Dean	15	1	0	2	1	19
2	8	MF	(England) Alex Gilbey	13	1	0	0	0	14
3	9	FW	(Wales) Ellis Harrison	8	0	0	0	0	8
4	11	MF	(England) Jack Payne	6	0	0	1	0	7
4	14	DF	(England) Joe Tomlinson	7	0	0	0	0	7
6	30	FW	(England) Matthew Dennis	4	0	0	1	0	5
6	10	FW	(Sudan) Mohamed Eisa	5	0	0	0	0	5
8	7	FW	(England) Jonathan Leko	3	0	0	1	0	4
8	22	FW	(England) Emre Tezgel	4	0	0	0	0	4
8	24	MF	(England) Stephen Wearne	4	0	0	0	0	4
11	21	DF	(Scotland) Daniel Harvie	3	0	0	0	0	3
11	27	FW	(England) Dan Kemp	3	0	0	0	0	3
11	5	DF	(Republic of Ireland) Warren O'Hora	3	0	0	0	0	3
14	20	MF	(Republic of Ireland) Darragh Burns	0	0	0	1	0	1
14	28	MF	(Republic of Ireland) Dawson Devoy	0	0	0	1	0	1
14	29	DF	(England) Kyran Lofthouse	1	0	0	0	0	1
14	35	DF	(England) Charlie Waller	0	0	0	1	0	1
14	6	MF	(Wales) MJ Williams	1	0	0	0	0	1
Own goals				3	0	0	0	0	3
Totals				83	2	0	8	1	94

=== Home attendances ===
Correct as of match played on 11 May 2024

Note: The list omits the FA Cup as the club did not play a home match in the competition.

Competition	Total	Matches	Highest	Lowest	Average
League Two	157,673	23	11,282	4,962	6,855
EFL Cup	2,946	1	2,946		2,946
EFL Trophy	4,141	3	1,704	789	1,380
Play-offs	10,053	1	10,053		10,053
Totals	174,813	28			6,243

=== Awards ===
Recipient	Award	Month	Ref
(Scotland) Graham Alexander	EFL League Two Manager of the Month	August	
(England) Max Dean	EFL Young Player of the Month	October	
(England) Mike Williamson	EFL League Two Manager of the Month	December	
(England) Dean Lewington	EFL League Two Player of the Month	December	
(England) Callum Tripp	EFL League Two Apprentice of the Season	n/a	
(England) Alex Gilbey	EFL League Two Goal of the Month	March	
