= Max Dean (footballer) =

English footballer (born 2004)

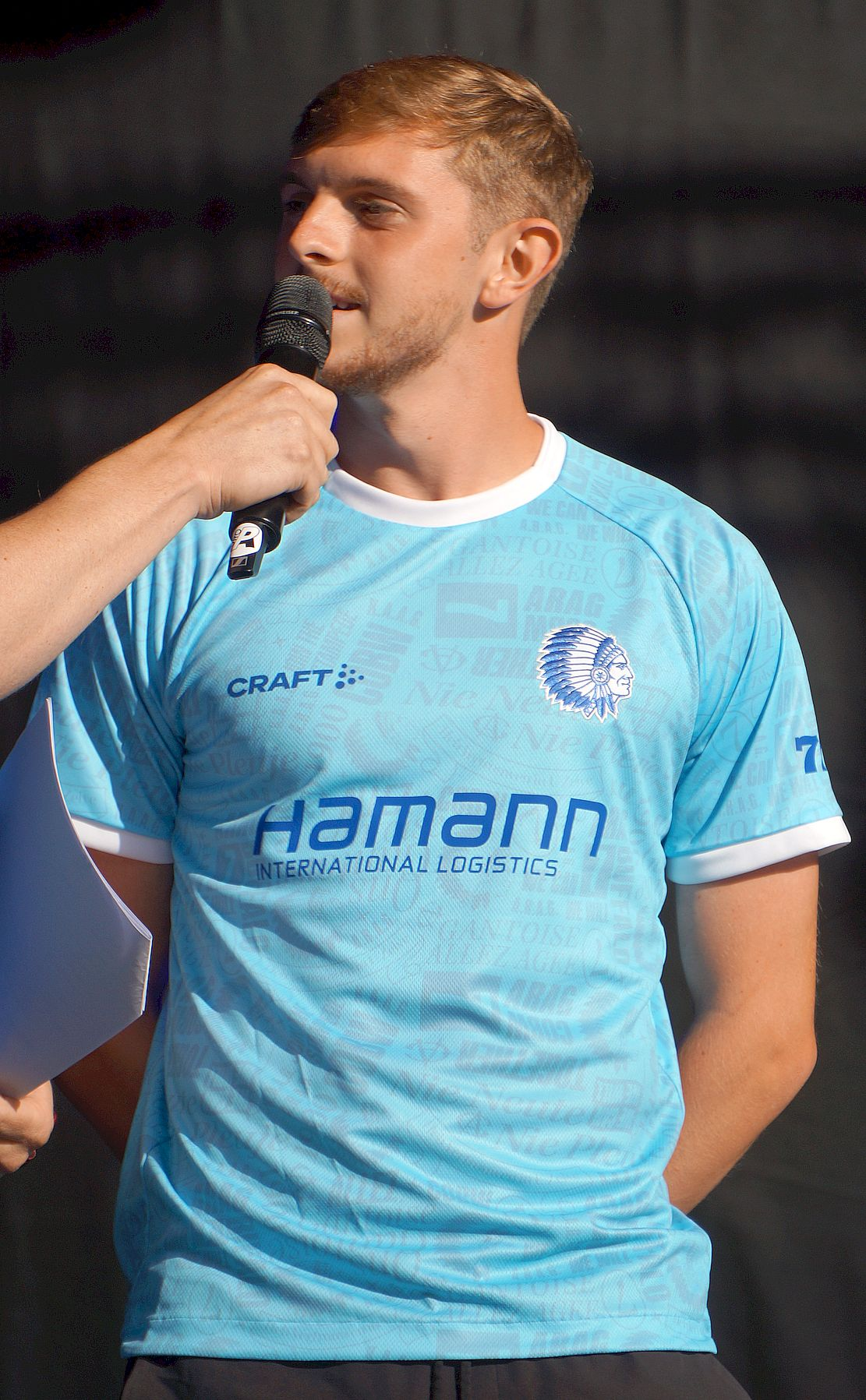

Personal information
- Full name: Max Jimmy Dean
- Date of birth: 21 February 2004 (age 22)
- Place of birth: Ormskirk, England
- Height: 1.78 m (5 ft 10 in)
- Position: Striker

Team information
- Current team: Gent
- Number: 21

Youth career
- Leeds United

Senior career*
Years	Team	Apps	(Gls)
2023–2024	Milton Keynes Dons	38	(16)
2024–	Gent	42	(13)
2025	Jong Gent	2	(0)

International career^{‡}
2024	England U20	4	(4)
- * Club domestic league appearances and goals as of 20:30, 25 October 2026 (UTC) ‡ National team caps and goals as of 13:40, 12 December 2024 (UTC)

Max Jimmy Dean (born 21 February 2004) is an English professional footballer who plays as a striker for Belgian Pro League club Gent.

== Club career ==
=== Leeds United ===
Dean began his career with Leeds United, signing his first professional contract with the club in March 2021.

=== Milton Keynes Dons ===
On 20 January 2023, Dean signed for League One club Milton Keynes Dons on a permanent deal for an undisclosed fee, reuniting with his former Leeds United U23 coach Mark Jackson. He made his senior professional debut for the club a day later as a second-half substitute in a 2–1 away win against Forest Green Rovers. On 4 February 2023, Dean scored his first senior professional goal in a 2–0 away win over Bristol Rovers.

Following an impressive start to the 2023–24 season, Dean was awarded the EFL Young Player of the Month award for October 2023 having scored four goals in five appearances.

Dean suffered an injury in February 2024. After returning to the first-team, he scored two goals and made two further assists in a 5–0 victory against Walsall on 30 March 2024. With the club reaching the play-offs, Dean finished the season as top scorer with 19 goals in all competitions, and was named Milton Keynes Dons' Young Player of the Year.

=== Gent ===
On 12 July 2024, Dean joined Belgian Pro League club Gent on a four-year contract for an undisclosed fee. He made his competitive debut for the club on 1 August 2024 in a 3–0 second leg UEFA Conference League second qualifying round away win over Vikingur, a game in which he provided an assist and scored from the penalty spot.

Dean scored in his next two games for Gent, in both legs of the third qualifying round tie against Silkeborg IF.

Dean was used sparingly by coach Wouter Vrancken in the early weeks of the 2024–25 Belgian Pro League season, but once given a starting place, he scored twice in three matches, including wins over Club Brugge, and Oud-Heverlee Leuven.

== International career ==
In October 2024, Dean was called up to an England age group squad for the first time, being selected for the England U20. He scored on his debut, coming off the bench during a 2–1 win over Italy, going on to score twice in a 3-0 home win over the Czech Republic later in the week in his second game for his country.

== Career statistics ==
As of match played 25 October 2026

Appearances and goals by club, season and competition
Club	Season	League			National cup (Note: Includes FA Cup, Belgian Cup)		League cup (Note: Includes EFL Cup)		Europe		Other		Total	
Club	Season	Division	Apps	Goals	Apps	Goals	Apps	Goals	Apps	Goals	Apps	Goals	Apps	Goals
Leeds United U21	2020–21	―			―		―		―		2 (Note: Appearance(s) in EFL Trophy)	2	2	2
Leeds United U21	2021–22	―			―		―		―		3	1	3	1
Leeds United U21	2022–23	―			―		―		―		1	0	1	0
Leeds United U21	Total		―		―		―		―		6	3	6	3
Milton Keynes Dons	2022–23	League One	9	1	0	0	0	0	―		0	0	9	1
Milton Keynes Dons	2023–24	League Two	29	15	1	1	0	0	―		4 (Note: Three appearances and two goals in EFL Trophy, two appearances and one goal in League Two play-offs)	3	34	19
Milton Keynes Dons	Total		38	16	1	1	0	0	0	0	4	3	43	20
KAA Gent	2024–25	Belgian Pro League	17	6	2	3	—		11 (Note: Appearances in UEFA Conference League)	4	―		30	13
KAA Gent	2025–26	Belgian Pro League	23	7	1	0	—		—		―		24	7
KAA Gent	2026–27	Belgian Pro League	2	0	1	0	—		2	0	―		5	0
KAA Gent	Total		42	13	4	3	0	0	13	4	0	0	59	20
Career total			80	29	5	4	0	0	13	4	10	6	108	43

== Honours ==
Individual

- EFL Young Player of the Month: October 2023
- Milton Keynes Dons Young Player of the Year: 2023–24
