= Alex Gilbey =

English footballer (born 1994)

Personal information
- Full name: Alexander Scott Gilbey
- Date of birth: 9 December 1994 (age 31)
- Place of birth: Dagenham, England
- Height: 6 ft 0 in (1.83 m)
- Position: Midfielder

Team information
- Current team: Milton Keynes Dons
- Number: 8

Youth career
- Frinton & Walton Youth
- 2007–2012: Colchester United

Senior career*
Years	Team	Apps	(Gls)
2012–2016	Colchester United	110	(7)
2013	→ Newport County (loan)	5	(0)
2016–2017	Wigan Athletic	17	(2)
2017–2020	Milton Keynes Dons	92	(11)
2020–2023	Charlton Athletic	60	(5)
2022–2023	→ Stevenage (loan)	39	(3)
2023–	Milton Keynes Dons	142	(38)
- * Club domestic league appearances and goals as of 21:56, 27 October 2026 (UTC)

Alexander Scott Gilbey (born 9 December 1994) is an English professional footballer who plays as a midfielder for EFL League One club Milton Keynes Dons, where he is also club captain.

A graduate of the Colchester United academy, his previous clubs also include Charlton Athletic, Wigan Athletic, Stevenage and Newport County.

== Career ==
=== Colchester United ===
Born in Dagenham, London, Gilbey grew up in Colchester, Essex, where he attended the Gilberd School. As a youth, he played for Frinton & Walton Youth, before joining and progressing through the Academy at Colchester United, where he was youth team captain. He embarked on his two-year scholarship with the club in 2011 and signed his first professional contract only one year into his scholarship, penning a 2 1/2-year deal in February 2012.

Gilbey received his first taste of first-team action during the 2011–12 campaign pre-season. He scored in a friendly against Woodbridge Town on 20 July 2011, opening the scoring in a 4–1 victory. Seven days later, Gilbey grabbed four goals as a youthful U's thrashed Whitton United 6–2. He played for the under-18s alongside featuring in the club's Essex Senior Cup squads, scoring in their 3–1 fourth round win against cup-holders Billericay Town on 9 November.

==== 2012–13 season ====
Following another pre-season mixing with the senior squad, Gilbey made his professional debut on 9 October 2012 in a Football League Trophy match at Northampton Town, where he came on as a half-time substitute for Marcus Bean. The game ended in a 2–1 loss for Colchester, with Gilbey giving away a penalty from which Northampton scored. He had to wait until 8 December for his next taste of first-team football when he came on as a substitute in a 2–0 home defeat to Oldham Athletic. He replaced Andy Bond after 70 minutes to make his Football League debut. He missed Colchester's next fixture against Bournemouth with an ankle injury, adding to manager Joe Dunne's injury woes, but returned to make his first senior start in Colchester's clash with Brentford on Boxing Day. The U's lost the encounter 3–1, but Dunne praised the efforts of his youthful starting eleven, although Gilbey was taken off after only 13 minutes in a tactical substitution following defender Josh Thompson's dismissal early in the game. He made his final appearance of the 2012–13 season for the club in Colchester's 2–1 home defeat to Scunthorpe United on 12 January 2013, playing the full 90 minutes.

==== Newport County (loan) ====
Having not featured for the Colchester first-team since mid-January, Gilbey joined Conference Premier side Newport County on 27 March 2013 on loan until the end of the season 2012–13 season to aid their promotion push. He was named in the squad that travelled to Gateshead on 28 March, but was an unused substitute. He made his debut in County's next fixture on 30 March, another 0–0 draw, on this occasion at home to Dartford, where Gilbey was replaced by Christian Jolley after 57 minutes.

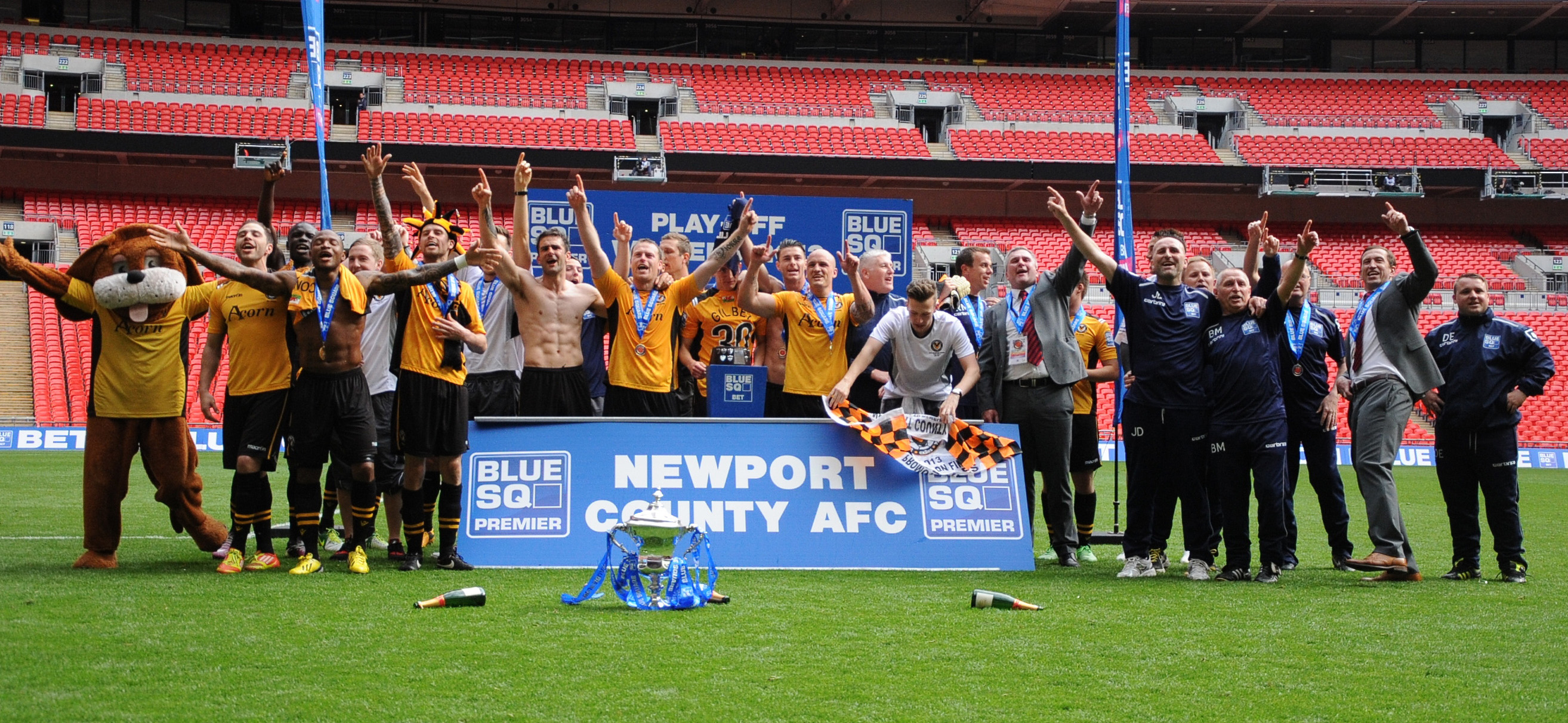
Alex Gilbey (centre) celebrating Newport County's play-off final victory over Wrexham on 5 May 2013

In the wake of his debut, Gilbey featured in a further four of Newport's seven remaining fixtures of the season, which included a late appearance from the bench at home to Braintree Town on 9 April, a 1–0 win which secured the club a play-off place; a start in County's 4–1 home victory against Macclesfield Town on 11 April; a further start on 13 April in a 2–0 win over Alfreton Town; and an appearance in a disappointing 3–0 away defeat to Grimsby Town on 20 April, a result which meant that the two sides would face each other in the play-off semi-finals.

In the play-off semi-finals, Gilbey helped his side to 1–0 wins in the first and second legs, setting up an all-Welsh final clash with Wrexham. Gilbey provided the pass for Christian Jolley's goal during the second leg fixture. Gilbey was named man of the match for his performance in the second leg, and described the opportunity to play at Wembley as "a dream come true". On 5 May 2013, Gilbey was a member of the starting eleven as Newport took on Wrexham at Wembley. He played for the full 90 minutes as County defeated their counterparts 2–0 to return to the Football League after a 25-year absence with promotion to League Two. Gilbey completed his loan spell with a play-off winners medal and eight appearances to his name as he returned to his parent club.

==== 2013–14 season ====
Following his successful loan spell with Newport, Gilbey returned to the first-team picture with Colchester for the 2013–14 season and was involved in the U's opening game 1–0 win over Gillingham on 3 August 2013, replacing Marcus Bean after 74 minutes. He made his first start of the campaign in the following game, a 5–1 League Cup thrashing by Peterborough United on 6 August. Gilbey was replaced by Sanchez Watt on 65 minutes when the U's were 2–1 down. He was utilised as a substitute in his next three games, a 1–0 win at home to Port Vale, a 1–1 home draw with Carlisle United and a 2–1 home loss to Leyton Orient. He then made only his second start of the season in the Football League Trophy clash with Dagenham & Redbridge on 3 September, a 4–1 defeat for Colchester. After this point, Gilbey began to cement his name in Joe Dunne's starting eleven, starting five days later in midfield for an injury ravaged U's side for a trip to Coventry City. United lost the match 2–0, but it gave Dunne plenty of positives to take away, where fellow youth product Tosin Olufemi featured and Mason Spence experienced his first taste of league football.

Having tied down teammates Tosin Olufemi and Drey Wright to long-term contracts, Colchester looked to do the same with Gilbey, offering him an extension to his deal which was due to expire in the summer of 2014. However, Gilbey rejected the initial offer, reportedly alerting a number of Championship clubs to the situation following his impressive start to the season and his successful stint with Newport. Despite this, Gilbey started in Colchester's next game, a 2–2 draw with Bradford City on 14 September. Manager Dunne urged Gilbey to reconsider the offer of the ability-based contract, the same offer that had been accepted by his teammates Olufemi and Wright, in which pay is increased after every ten games played for the club. Gilbey then quelled the speculation by pointing out that he wished to stay with Colchester and that he was happy working under Dunne, having featured in the starting eleven for a number of matches in the early stages of the 2013–14 season.

Having become a regular for the U's and making 37 senior appearances, Gilbey penned a 2 1/2-year contract extension on 16 January 2014, tying him to the club until summer 2016. He revealed that boss Joe Dunne was a major influence in his decision to sign the contract, and that Dunne's belief in him was proven by his regular role in the first-team picture. Despite signing the contract, Gilbey did not start a match for Colchester between December and March, when he made a pivotal return to the starting eleven for a 1–0 victory against Shrewsbury Town, providing the assist for Jabo Ibehre's match-winning goal. Shortly afterward, Gilbey scored his first professional goal in Colchester's 4–2 defeat to Wolverhampton Wanderers at Molineux on 25 March, finding the back of the net with a header to reduce the U's deficit to 3–1 after 58 minutes.

Gilbey ended the season with 39 appearances across all competitions in addition to his goal against Wolves. As a result, Gilbey was awarded with the Colchester United "Young Player of the Year" accolade at the club's annual end of season awards dinner in May 2014.

==== 2014–15 season ====
Prior to the 2014–15 season kicking-off, Gilbey was mooted as a replacement captain for the outgoing Brian Wilson in July 2014. Before the announcement was made however, Gilbey suffered a shin injury during Colchester's 3–0 friendly defeat to Ipswich Town, being forced off at half-time. He quickly returned from injury as the U's suffered a 2–0 defeat to Bishop's Stortford on 31 July.

Gilbey started Colchester's first match of the season in the centre of midfield for their home clash with Oldham Athletic on 9 August, playing for the duration of the match as the U's were held to a 2–2 draw. On hearing the news of Joe Dunne's departure as manager of Colchester United following a disappointing beginning to the campaign, Gilbey said that he was left "devastated" by Dunne's exit, but said that he "couldn't have wished for a better appointment" following Academy manager Tony Humes' promotion to first-team manager. Gilbey described Dunne, the person who handed him his professional debut, as "a big influence on me both on and off the pitch". On 16 September, Gilbey contributed to Colchester's downfall in their 3–2 loss to Sheffield United at the Colchester Community Stadium when he conceded a penalty in the 88th minute while the score was 2–2. The U's had already relinquished a two-goal cushion just five minutes earlier, and the unlucky Gilbey had clattered the post with a powerful shot in the fifth minute. He scored his second Colchester goal and his first of the season with a 25-yard shot to level scores at 2–2 in the U's eventual 4–2 defeat to Preston North End on 4 October. He then added to his tally on 9 November in Colchester's 6–3 FA Cup first round win over Gosport Borough. Gilbey finished with a deflected shot following a fine solo run from his own half to give the U's a 4–1 advantage going into the break.

==== 2015–16 season ====
Ahead of the 2015–16 season, Gilbey was named as vice-captain to Chris Porter on 21 July 2015. In his first appearance of the season, Gilbey scored an equalising volleyed goal to level the score at 1–1 in an eventual 2–2 draw with Blackpool on 8 August. He made his 100th appearance for Colchester United on 12 December, captaining the side until Porter's introduction as a second-half substitute during their 3–2 defeat to Barnsley at the Community Stadium. He scored his second goal of the season on 19 January 2016 in Colchester's 1–1 home draw with Fleetwood Town.

Following comments by Colchester manager Kevin Keen that Gilbey would "be a Premier League player" in two or three years, it was reported that the club had rejected a bid for Gilbey from Championship side Bristol City on 22 January. After further contact between the two clubs, Colchester offered Gilbey an improved contract on 28 January. He was sent off for the first time in his career on 6 February during Colchester's 3–0 Essex derby defeat to Southend United for a challenge on Ryan Leonard.

After no ground had been made on Gilbey's contract offer, Keen admitted that he "very much doubt[ed]" that Gilbey would sign a new deal with the club. Gilbey remarked that he would "put it to the back" of his mind with his main focus being on "playing well and keeping Colchester in the league". He scored his third goal of the season on 12 March during a 3–3 draw at home to Wigan Athletic. He doubled his previous season-best goal tally on 19 March with a headed goal in Colchester's 2–1 defeat to Walsall at the Bescot Stadium, before adding his third goal in three games during Colchester's 4–1 win over Doncaster Rovers on 25 March. After scoring five goals in 42 appearances, Gilbey was named as Colchester's Player of the Year at the club's End of Season award ceremony on 13 May. He was offered a new contract to remain with the club at the end of the season.

=== Wigan Athletic ===
==== 2016–17 season ====
Following the expiry of his Colchester United deal, Gilbey joined newly promoted Championship side Wigan Athletic on 21 June 2016 for an undisclosed fee, signing a three-year contract. He scored on his debut with the opening goal of a 2–1 defeat to Bristol City on 6 August 2016. A knee injury sustained against Fulham in October lead to Gilbey being ruled out for four months. Gilbey scored his second goal for Wigan in his final appearance of the season, netting an equaliser in a 3–2 comeback victory at home to Rotherham United.

=== Milton Keynes Dons ===
==== 2017–18 season ====
On 31 August 2017, Gilbey joined League One club Milton Keynes Dons for an undisclosed fee, signing a three-year deal. On 21 October 2017, Gilbey scored his first goal for the club in a 4–4 home draw with Oldham Athletic.

Following a 1–0 away defeat to Walsall on 3 February 2018, Gilbey sustained a significant knee injury requiring surgery. Milton Keynes Dons' Head of Sports Medicine Simon Crampton stated that Gilbey would be out of action until several months into the 2018–19 season.

==== 2018–19 season ====
Despite concerns of a long period out through injury, Gilbey recovered nearly six months ahead of schedule and returned to first team action in time for the start of the new season, featuring in a 2–1 away win over Oldham Athletic on 4 August 2018.

On 27 November 2018, he scored twice in a 2–0 home league win over Morecambe, with both goals long distance strikes from outside the penalty area. Having played a crucial role in the club's promotion back to League One despite missing the last two months of the season through injury, Gilbey was voted the club's Player of the Year for the 2018–19 season.

=== Charlton Athletic ===
==== 2020–21 season ====
In August 2020 he signed for Charlton Athletic. He scored his first goal for the club on 10 April 2021 in a 2–1 win against Sunderland.

On 13 May 2023, it was announced that Gilbey would leave the club when his contract expired in June.

==== Stevenage (loan) ====
On 1 September 2022, Gilbey joined Stevenage on a season–long loan. He scored his first goal for the club on 13 September 2022 in a 1–0 win against former club Newport County. Gilbey went on to feature 45 times for Stevenage in all competitions, scoring 3 goals, and played a key role in the club's second-place promotion to League One.

=== Milton Keynes Dons (second spell) ===
==== 2023–24 season ====
On 31 May 2023, following his release from Charlton it was announced Gilbey would return to former club Milton Keynes Dons on a free transfer effective from 1 July 2023. He made his second debut for the club on 5 August 2023, captaining the side in a 5–3 away win over Wrexham. Having captained the side on several occasions, the club went on to achieve a play-off finish, with Gilbey recording a career-best 14 goals in all competitions. He was later named the club's Player of the Year, becoming the first player in Milton Keynes Dons' history to win the award three times.

==== 2024–25 season ====
On 9 September 2024, he signed a contract extension with the club. Having played a key role in a successful start to the season which saw Milton Keynes Dons reach the play-off positions, Gilbey was named the EFL League Two Player of the Month for November 2024.

==== 2025–26 season ====
Following the retirement of long-serving teammate Dean Lewington, Gilbey was made club captain ahead of the 2025–26 season. His first full season as captain would end with success, he featured in 45 league matches and scored 12 goals as the club achieved promotion back to League One with a second-placed finish. On 15 May 2026, the club announced he had signed a new deal.

== Career statistics ==
As of 27 October 2026

Appearances and goals by club, season and competition
Club	Season	League			FA Cup		League Cup		Other		Total	
Club	Season	Division	Apps	Goals	Apps	Goals	Apps	Goals	Apps	Goals	Apps	Goals
Colchester United	2012–13	League One	3	0	0	0	0	0	1 (Note: Appearance(s) in Football League/EFL Trophy)	0	4	0
Colchester United	2013–14	League One	36	1	1	0	1	0	1	0	39	1
Colchester United	2014–15	League One	34	1	1	1	1	0	0	0	36	2
Colchester United	2015–16	League One	37	5	4	0	1	0	0	0	42	5
Colchester United	Total		110	7	6	1	3	0	2	0	121	8
Newport County (loan)	2012–13	Conference Premier	5	0	—		—		3 (Note: Appearances in Football Conference play-offs)	0	8	0
Wigan Athletic	2016–17	Championship	15	2	0	0	0	0	0	0	15	2
Wigan Athletic	2017–18	League One	2	0	—		2	0	1	1	5	1
Wigan Athletic	Total		17	2	0	0	2	0	1	1	20	3
Milton Keynes Dons	2017–18	League One	23	3	2	0	—		—		25	3
Milton Keynes Dons	2018–19	League Two	39	3	1	0	1	0	2	0	43	3
Milton Keynes Dons	2019–20	League One	30	5	1	0	3	0	3	0	37	5
Milton Keynes Dons	Total		92	11	4	0	4	0	5	0	105	11
Charlton Athletic	2020–21	League One	23	3	0	0	2	0	0	0	25	3
Charlton Athletic	2021–22	League One	37	2	2	0	0	0	1	1	40	3
Charlton Athletic	2022–23	League One	0	0	—		1	0	—		1	0
Charlton Athletic	Total		60	5	2	0	3	0	1	1	66	6
Stevenage (loan)	2022–23	League Two	39	3	3	0	—		3	0	45	3
Milton Keynes Dons	2023–24	League Two	46	13	1	1	1	0	2 (Note: Appearances in League Two play-offs)	0	50	14
Milton Keynes Dons	2024–25	League Two	42	11	1	0	1	0	0	0	44	11
Milton Keynes Dons	2025–26	League Two	44	12	1	0	1	0	0	0	46	12
Milton Keynes Dons	2026–27	League One	10	2	0	0	0	0	0	0	10	2
Milton Keynes Dons	Total		142	38	3	1	3	0	2	0	150	39
Career total			465	66	18	2	15	0	17	2	515	80

== Honours ==
Newport County

- Conference Premier play-offs: 2013

Milton Keynes Dons

- EFL League Two third-place promotion: 2018–19
- EFL League Two runner-up: 2025–26

Stevenage

- EFL League Two second-place promotion: 2022–23

Individual

- Colchester United Young Player of the Year: 2013–14
- Colchester United Player of the Year: 2015–16
- Milton Keynes Dons Player of the Year: 2018–19, 2019–20, 2023–24
- Milton Keynes Dons Players' Player of the Year: 2023–24
- EFL League One Player of the Month: December 2019
- EFL League Two Player of the Month: November 2024
- PFA Team of the Year: 2025–26 League Two
