= Charlie Waller (footballer) =

English footballer

Personal information
- Full name: Charlie James O'Meara Waller
- Date of birth: 11 March 2005 (age 21)
- Place of birth: Kettering, England
- Positions: Centre-back; midfielder

Team information
- Current team: Worthing (on loan from Milton Keynes Dons)
- Number: 28

Youth career
- –2023: Milton Keynes Dons

Senior career*
Years	Team	Apps	(Gls)
2023–	Milton Keynes Dons	8	(0)
2023	→ AFC Rushden & Diamonds (loan)	8	(0)
2023–2024	→ Billericay Town (loan)	2	(0)
2023–2024	→ Banbury United (loan)	11	(1)
2024	→ Sutton United (loan)	21	(1)
2025–2026	→ Rochdale (loan)	3	(0)
2026	→ Wealdstone (loan)	8	(0)
2026–	→ Worthing (loan)	8	(0)
- * Club domestic league appearances and goals as of 17:00, 24 October 2026 (UTC)

Charlie James O'Meara Waller (born 7 November 2005) is an English professional footballer who plays as a defender for National League club Worthing, on loan from EFL League One club Milton Keynes Dons.

== Club career ==
=== Milton Keynes Dons ===
Waller joined the academy of Milton Keynes Dons at a young age, and went on to progress to the club's U18 team where he regularly captained the side.

He signed his first professional deal with the club in June 2023 prior to the start of the 2023–24 season. Waller made his professional debut on 29 August 2023, coming on as a 60th-minute substitution in a 4–1 home EFL Trophy group stage win over Chelsea U21. On 21 November 2023 in the same competition, he scored his first senior goal in a 3–2 home win over Northampton Town.

In November 2023, he joined National League North club Banbury United on an initial one-month loan deal, which was later extended until the end of the season.

On 1 August 2024, Waller joined National League club Sutton United on loan until January 2025. He returned to his parent club on 29 December 2024.

On 19 December 2025, Waller joined National League club Rochdale on an initial one-month loan deal. On 21 January 2026, Waller joined National League club Wealdstone on loan for the remainder of the 2025–26 season.

== Career statistics ==
As of 24 October 2026

Appearances and goals by club, season and competition
Club	Season	League			FA Cup		EFL Cup		Other		Total	
Club	Season	Division	Apps	Goals	Apps	Goals	Apps	Goals	Apps	Goals	Apps	Goals
Milton Keynes Dons	2023–24	League Two	0	0	—		0	0	2 (Note: Appearance(s) in EFL Trophy)	1	2	1
Milton Keynes Dons	2024–25	League Two	8	0	0	0	0	0	0	0	8	0
Milton Keynes Dons	2025–26	League Two	0	0	0	0	1	0	0	0	1	0
Milton Keynes Dons	2026–27	League One	0	0	0	0	0	0	0	0	0	0
Milton Keynes Dons	Total		8	0	0	0	1	0	2	1	11	1
AFC Rushden & Diamonds (loan)	2022–23	Southern Premier C	8	0	—		—		—		8	0
Billericay Town (loan)	2023–24	Isthmian Premier	2	0	0	0	—		—		2	0
Banbury United (loan)	2023–24	National League North	11	1	—		—		—		11	1
Sutton United (loan)	2024–25	National League	21	1	1	0	—		1 (Note: Appearance(s) in FA Trophy)	0	23	1
Rochdale (loan)	2025–26	National League	3	0	—		—		1	0	4	0
Wealdstone (loan)	2025–26	National League	8	0	—		—		—		8	0
Worthing (loan)	2026–27	National League	8	0	—		—		0	0	8	0
Career total			69	1	1	0	1	0	4	1	75	3
