= EFL Young Player of the Month =

English professional football award

The EFL Young Player of the Month is an award for young players in all three divisions of the English Football League. To be eligible players must be under-21 or turn 21 during the current season. It was first awarded in December 2009. Victor Moses of Crystal Palace was the first winner.

== List of winners ==
Month	Year (Note: Each year in the table is linked to the corresponding football season.)	Nationality	Player	Team	Division	Age (Note: Age at the end of the month awarded)	Ref
December	2009	Nigeria	Victor Moses	Crystal Palace	Championship	19 years, 20 days	
January	2010	England	Chris Martin	Norwich City	League One	21 years, 89 days	
February	2010	England	Alex Smithies	Huddersfield Town	League One	19 years, 361 days	
March	2010	England	Charlie Austin	Swindon Town	League One	20 years, 270 days	
April	2010	England	Connor Wickham	Ipswich Town	Championship	17 years, 31 days	
August	2010	England	Sam Baldock	Milton Keynes Dons	League One	21 years, 170 days	
September	2010	England	Marvin Sordell	Watford	Championship	21 years, 226 days	
October	2010	England	Kazenga LuaLua	Brighton & Hove Albion	League One	19 years, 326 days	
November	2010	England	Steven Caulker	Bristol City	Championship	18 years, 337 days	
December	2010	England	Will Buckley	Watford	Championship	21 years, 33 days	
January	2011	England	Jay Rodriguez	Burnley	Championship	21 years, 188 days	
February	2011	England	Jon Taylor	Shrewsbury Town	League Two	18 years, 224 days	
March	2011	England	Alex McCarthy	Reading	Championship	21 years, 119 days	
April	2011	England	Danny Ings	AFC Bournemouth	League One	19 years, 16 days	
August	2011	England	Harry Maguire	Sheffield United	League One	18 years, 180 days	
September	2011	England	Gary Madine	Sheffield Wednesday	League One	21 years, 38 days	
October	2011	Northern Ireland	Billy Kee	Burton Albion	League Two	20 years, 335 days	
November	2011	England	Jonjo Shelvey	Blackpool	Championship	19 years, 277 days	
December	2011	England	Nick Powell	Crewe Alexandra	League Two	17 years, 283 days	
January	2012	Scotland	Matt Phillips	Blackpool	Championship	20 years, 325 days	
February	2012	Wales	Kieron Freeman	Notts County	League One	19 years, 356 days	
March	2012	Ireland	Sean Murray	Watford	Championship	18 years, 173 days	
April	2012	England	Luke Freeman	Stevenage	League One	20 years, 40 days	
August	2012	England	Max Clayton	Crewe Alexandra	League One	18 years, 23 days	
September	2012	England	George Bowerman	Walsall	League One	20 years, 330 days	
October	2012	England	Wilfried Zaha	Crystal Palace	Championship	19 years, 357 days	
November	2012	England	Will Hughes	Derby County	Championship	17 years, 238 days	
December	2012	England	Tendayi Darikwa	Chesterfield	League Two	21 years, 19 days	
January	2013	Ireland	Carl McHugh	Bradford City	League Two	19 years, 362 days	
February	2013	England	George Long	Sheffield United	League One	19 years, 116 days	
March	2013	England	Sam Byram	Leeds United	Championship	19 years, 197 days	
April	2013	England	Nathaniel Chalobah	Watford	Championship	18 years, 138 days	
August	2013	England	Britt Assombalonga	Peterborough United	League One	20 years, 269 days	
September	2013	England	Liam Moore	Leicester City	Championship	20 years, 243 days	
October	2013	England	Jordan Cousins	Charlton Athletic	Championship	19 years, 240 days	
November	2013	England	Ollie Banks	Chesterfield	League Two	21 years, 71 days	
December	2013	England	Patrick Bamford	Milton Keynes Dons	League One	20 years, 118 days	
January	2014	England	Jake Bidwell	Brentford	League One	20 years, 326 days	
February	2014	United States	Will Packwood	Birmingham City	Championship	20 years, 284 days	
March	2014	England	Dale Jennings	Barnsley	Championship	21 years, 101 days	
April	2014	England	Moses Odubajo	Leyton Orient	League One	20 years, 277 days	
August	2014	England	Dele Alli	Milton Keynes Dons	League One	18 years, 143 days	
September	2014	England	Matt Ingram	Wycombe Wanderers	League Two	20 years, 287 days	
October	2014	England	Marcus Maddison	Peterborough United	League One	21 years, 36 days	
November	2014	England	Alex Mowatt	Leeds United	Championship	19 years, 291 days	
December	2014	England	Demarai Gray	Birmingham City	Championship	18 years, 187 days	
January	2015	England	Dominic Iorfa	Wolverhampton Wanderers	Championship	19 years, 208 days	
February	2015	England	Joe Bryan	Bristol City	League One	21 years, 165 days	
March	2015	England	Scott Harrison	Hartlepool United	League Two	21 years, 210 days	
April	2015	England	Dan Bentley	Southend United	League Two	21 years, 292 days	
August	2015	Scotland	Ryan Fraser	Ipswich Town	Championship	21 years, 189 days	
September	2015	England	Rico Henry	Walsall	League One	18 years, 85 days	
October	2015	France	Moussa Dembélé	Fulham	Championship	19 years, 112 days	
November	2015	England	Jermaine Anderson	Peterborough United	League One	19 years, 199 days	
December	2015	Wales	Tom Lockyer	Bristol Rovers	League Two	21 years, 29 days	
January	2016	England	Ben Osborn	Nottingham Forest	Championship	21 years, 180 days	
February	2016	Northern Ireland	Cameron McGeehan	Luton Town	League Two	20 years, 330 days	
March	2016	England	Ollie Watkins	Exeter City	League Two	20 years, 93 days	
April	2016	England	Ben Thompson	Millwall	League One	20 years, 211 days	
August	2016	England	Nathan Smith	Port Vale	League One	20 years, 151 days	
September	2016	England	Tammy Abraham	Bristol City	Championship	18 years, 365 days	
October	2016	England	Kalvin Phillips	Leeds United	Championship	20 years, 335 days	
November	2016	England	Liam Mandeville	Doncaster Rovers	League Two	19 years, 288 days	
December	2016	England	Frankie Kent	Colchester United	League Two	21 years, 41 days	
January	2017	England	John Swift	Reading	Championship	21 years, 223 days	
February	2017	England	Ryan Ledson	Oxford United	League One	19 years, 194 days	
March	2017	Nigeria	Bright Osayi-Samuel	Blackpool	League Two	19 years, 91 days	
April	2017	England	Josh Cullen	Bradford City	League One	21 years, 24 days	
August	2017	England	Jarrod Bowen	Hull City	Championship	20 years, 255 days	
September	2017	England	Callum Brittain	Milton Keynes Dons	League One	19 years, 203 days	
October	2017	Ivory Coast	Siriki Dembélé	Grimsby Town	League Two	21 years, 55 days	
November	2017	England	Hakeeb Adelakun	Scunthorpe United	League One	21 years, 173 days	
December	2017	England	Callum Lang	Morecambe	League Two	19 years, 115 days	
January	2018	England	James Maddison	Norwich City	Championship	21 years, 70 days	
February	Not awarded						
March	Not awarded						
April	Not awarded						
August	2018	England	Josh Maja	Sunderland	League One	19 years, 248 days	
September	2018	Northern Ireland	Jamal Lewis	Norwich City	Championship	20 years, 249 days	
October	2018	England	Harvey Gilmour	Tranmere Rovers	League Two	19 years, 321 days	
November	2018	England	James Justin	Luton Town	League One	20 years, 281 days	
December	2018	England	George Miller	Bradford City	League One	20 years, 143 days	
January	2019	Scotland	Jacob Brown	Barnsley	League One	20 years, 297 days	
February	2019	England	Tyrese Campbell	Shrewsbury Town	League One	19 years, 63 days	
March	Not awarded						
April	Not awarded						
August	2019	England	Conor Gallagher	Charlton Athletic	Championship	19 years, 207 days	
September	2019	England	Jacob Greaves	Cheltenham Town	League Two	19 years, 19 days	
October	2019	Finland	Marcus Forss	AFC Wimbledon	League One	20 years, 136 days	
November	2019	England	Jude Bellingham	Birmingham City	Championship	16 years, 155 days	
December	2019	England	Djed Spence	Middlesbrough	Championship	19 years, 145 days	
January	2020	Wales	Luke Jephcott	Plymouth Argyle	League Two	20 years, 6 days	
February	2020	Australia	Harry Souttar	Fleetwood Town	League One	21 years, 131 days	
September	2020	England	Keane Lewis-Potter	Hull City	League One	19 years, 222 days	
October	2020	Wales	Brandon Cooper	Newport County	League Two	20 years, 292 days	
November	2020	England	Max Aarons	Norwich City	Championship	20 years, 332 days	
December	2020	France	Michael Olise	Reading	Championship	19 years, 20 days	
January	2021	Ghana	Kwadwo Baah	Rochdale	League One	18 years, 5 days	
February	2021	England	Callum Styles	Barnsley	Championship	20 years, 338 days	
March	2021	England	Morgan Rogers	Lincoln City	League One	18 years, 249 days	
April	2021	England	Ayoub Assal	AFC Wimbledon	League One	19 years, 100 days	
August	2021	England	Fábio Carvalho	Fulham	Championship	19 years, 2 days	
September	2021	Wales	Brennan Johnson	Nottingham Forest	Championship	20 years, 131 days	
October	2021	England	Connor Taylor	Bristol Rovers	League Two	20 years, 7 days	
November	2021	England	Matt O'Riley	Milton Keynes Dons	League One	21 years, 10 days	
December	2021	England	Dan Neil	Sunderland	League One	20 years, 19 days	
January	2022	England	Finn Azaz	Newport County	League Two	21 years, 147 days	
February	2022	England	Joe Tomlinson	Swindon Town	League Two	21 years, 265 days	
March	2022	England	Djed Spence	Nottingham Forest	Championship	21 years, 235 days	
April	2022	England	Elliot Anderson	Bristol Rovers	League Two	19 years, 176 days	
August	2022	Scotland	Tommy Conway	Bristol City	Championship	20 years, 26 days	
September	2022	England	Bali Mumba	Plymouth Argyle	League One	20 years, 358 days	
October	2022	England	Jay Stansfield	Exeter City	League One	19 years, 342 days	
November	2022	England	Ayoub Assal	AFC Wimbledon	League Two	20 years, 10 days	
December	2022	Ivory Coast	Amad	Sunderland	Championship	20 years, 174 days	
January	2023	England	Junior Tchamadeu	Colchester United	League Two	19 years, 41 days	
February	2023	England	Alex Scott	Bristol City	Championship	19 years, 135 days	
March	2023	Iraq	Ali Al-Hamadi	AFC Wimbledon	League Two	20 years, 309 days	
April	Not awarded						
August	2023	England	Jonathan Rowe	Norwich City	Championship	20 years, 124 days	
September	2023	England	Louie Barry	Stockport County	League Two	20 years, 102 days	
October	2023	England	Max Dean	Milton Keynes Dons	League Two	19 years, 253 days	
November	2023	England	Tyler Morton	Hull City	Championship	21 years, 31 days	
December	2023	England	Bailey Cadamarteri	Sheffield Wednesday	Championship	18 years, 237 days	
January	2024	England	Ronnie Edwards	Peterborough United	League One	20 years, 310 days	
February	2024	Republic of Ireland	Emmanuel Adegboyega	Walsall	League Two	20 years, 167 days	
March	2024	Wales	Joe Taylor	Lincoln City	League One	21 years, 135 days	
April	2024	Portugal	Fábio Carvalho	Hull City	Championship	21 years, 245 days	
August	2024	England	Louie Barry	Stockport County	League One	21 years, 72 days	
September	2024	England	Chris Rigg	Sunderland	Championship	17 years, 105 days	
October	2024	England	Nathan Lowe	Walsall	League Two	19 years, 44 days	
November	2024	Scotland	Ben Doak	Middlesbrough	Championship	19 years, 20 days	
December	2024	England	Miles Leaburn	Charlton Athletic	League One	21 years, 34 days	
January	2025	England	Jamie Donley	Leyton Orient	League One	20 years, 29 days	
February	2025	England	CJ Egan-Riley	Burnley	Championship	22 years, 58 days	
March	2025	England	Jovon Makama	Lincoln City	League One	21 years, 59 days	
April	2025	Serbia	Mihailo Ivanović	Millwall	Championship	20 years, 153 days	
August	2025	Wales	Dylan Lawlor	Cardiff City	League One	19 years, 243 days	
September	2025	Sierra Leone	Daniel Kanu	Walsall	League Two	20 years, 321 days	
October	2025	England	Amario Cozier-Duberry	Bolton Wanderers	League One	20 years, 156 days	
November	2025	England	Reyes Cleary	Barnsley	League One	21 years, 232 days	
December	2025	England	Leo Castledine	Huddersfield Town	League One	20 years, 134 days	
January	2026	England	Bobby Clark	Derby County	Championship	20 years, 359 days	
February	2026	Australia	Mohamed Touré	Norwich City	Championship	21 years, 340 days	
March	2026	England	Dom Ballard	Leyton Orient	League One	21 years, 0 days	
April	2026	England	Omari Kellyman	Cardiff City	League One	20 years, 228 days	
August	2026	England	Jimmy-Jay Morgan	West Bromwich Albion	Championship	20 years, 223 days	
September	2026	England	Will Lankshear	Middlesbrough	Championship	21 years, 164 days	

== Awards won by division ==
Up to and including the September 2026 award.

Division	Wins
Championship	55
League One	55
League Two	34

== Awards won by nationality ==
Up to and including the September 2026 award.

Country	Wins
England	113
Wales	6
Scotland	4
Northern Ireland	3
Republic of Ireland	3
Australia	2
France	2
Ivory Coast	2
Nigeria	2
Finland	1
Ghana	1
Iraq	1
Portugal	1
Serbia	1
Sierra Leone	1
United States	1

== Awards won by club ==
Up to and including the September 2026 award.

Club	Wins
Milton Keynes Dons	6
Norwich City	6
Bristol City	5
Walsall	5
AFC Wimbledon	4
Barnsley	4
Hull City	4
Peterborough United	4
Watford	4
Birmingham City	3
Blackpool	3
Bradford City	3
Bristol Rovers	3
Charlton Athletic	3
Leeds United	3
Leyton Orient	3
Lincoln City	3
Middlesbrough	3
Nottingham Forest	3
Reading	3
Sunderland	3
Swindon Town	3
Burnley	2
Cardiff City	2
Chesterfield	2
Colchester United	2
Crewe Alexandra	2
Crystal Palace	2
Derby County	2
Exeter City	2
Fulham	2
Huddersfield Town	2
Ipswich Town	2
Luton Town	2
Millwall	2
Newport County	2
Plymouth Argyle	2
Sheffield United	2
Sheffield Wednesday	2
Shrewsbury Town	2
Stockport County	2
AFC Bournemouth	1
Bolton Wanderers	1
Brentford	1
Brighton & Hove Albion	1
Burton Albion	1
Cheltenham Town	1
Doncaster Rovers	1
Fleetwood Town	1
Grimsby Town	1
Hartlepool United	1
Leicester City	1
Morecambe	1
Notts County	1
Oxford United	1
Port Vale	1
Rochdale	1
Scunthorpe United	1
Southend United	1
Stevenage	1
Sunderland	1
Tranmere Rovers	1
West Bromwich Albion	1
Wolverhampton Wanderers	1
Wycombe Wanderers	1
