= Phoenix Scholtz =

Northern Irish footballer (born 2005)

Personal information
- Full name: Phoenix Paul Charles Scholtz
- Date of birth: 7 November 2005 (age 21)
- Place of birth: Milton Keynes, England
- Position: Right-back

Team information
- Current team: Northwood (on loan from Milton Keynes Dons)

Youth career
- 2014–: Milton Keynes Dons

Senior career*
Years	Team	Apps	(Gls)
2023–2026	Milton Keynes Dons	2	(0)
2024	→ AFC Dunstable (loan)	2	(0)
2026	→ Northwood (loan)	1	(0)

International career^{‡}
2022	Northern Ireland U18	2	(0)
2023–	Northern Ireland U19	2	(0)
- * Club domestic league appearances and goals as of 23 March 2026 (UTC) ‡ National team caps and goals as of 15 November 2023 (UTC)

Phoenix Paul Charles Scholtz (born 7 November 2005) is a Northern Irish professional footballer who plays as a right-back for EFL League One club Milton Keynes Dons. He will leave the club at the end of his contract on 30 June 2026.

== Club career ==
=== Milton Keynes Dons ===
Scholtz joined the academy of Milton Keynes Dons at a young age, and went on to progress to the club's U18 side as a first year scholar.

After featuring heavily in pre-season for the first team, Scholtz was given the squad number 25 ahead of the 2023–24 campaign. He made his competitive first team debut on 5 August 2023, coming on as stoppage time substitute in a 5–3 away league victory over Wrexham.

On 21 August 2024, Scholtz joined Southern League Division One Central club AFC Dunstable on a short-term loan. In March 2026, Scholtz joined fellow Southern League Division One Central side Northwood on loan.

He was one of nine players released by the club at the end of the 2025–26 season.

== International career ==
Scholtz was called up to the Northern Ireland U18 team in November 2022, and went on to make his debut against Austria U18 on 15 November 2022. In September 2023 he was called up to the Northern Ireland U19 side ahead of a friendly against Italy U19.

== Career statistics ==
As of 29 August 2023

Appearances and goals by club, season and competition
Club	Season	League			FA Cup		EFL Cup		Other		Total	
Club	Season	Division	Apps	Goals	Apps	Goals	Apps	Goals	Apps	Goals	Apps	Goals
Milton Keynes Dons	2023–24	League Two	2	0	0	0	0	0	1 (Note: Appearance(s) in EFL Trophy)	0	3	0
Career total			2	0	0	0	0	0	1	0	3	0
