= Joe Tomlinson =

English footballer

Personal information
- Full name: Joseph William George Tomlinson
- Date of birth: 9 June 2000 (age 26)
- Height: 1.67 m (5 ft 6 in)
- Position: Full-back

Team information
- Current team: Cheltenham Town
- Number: 4

Youth career
- Southampton
- Yeovil Town

Senior career*
Years	Team	Apps	(Gls)
2018–2019	Brighton & Hove Albion	0	(0)
2018–2019	→ Bognor Regis Town (loan)	32	(3)
2019–2020	Hungerford Town	33	(4)
2020–2021	Eastleigh	41	(12)
2021–2023	Peterborough United	9	(0)
2022	→ Swindon Town (loan)	10	(1)
2023	→ Swindon Town (loan)	7	(1)
2023–2026	Milton Keynes Dons	98	(11)
2026–	Cheltenham Town	9	(0)
- * Club domestic league appearances and goals as of 15:21, 3 October 2026 (UTC)

Joseph William George Tomlinson (born 9 June 2000) is an English professional footballer who plays as a full-back for EFL League Two club Cheltenham Town.

== Club career ==
=== Early years ===
Tomlinson played for the academies of Southampton and Yeovil Town, before joining the under-23 side of Brighton & Hove Albion at the age of 17. He spent time on loan with non-league club Bognor Regis Town, but was released by Brighton at the end of the 2018–19 season.

=== Non-league ===
Ahead of the 2019–20 season, Tomlinson joined National League South club Hungerford Town, where he was later appointed captain at the age of 19. He then signed for National League club Eastleigh ahead of the 2020–21 season. In his first season, Tomlinson finished as the club's top scorer with 12 goals in 42 appearances in all competitions, despite playing from left-back. He was later named the club's Player of the Year and Young Player of the Year for the 2020–21 season.

=== Peterborough United ===
After catching the eye of several football league clubs, Tomlinson joined Championship club Peterborough United in July 2021, signing a three-year deal. With first team opportunities limited, he signed for League Two club Swindon Town on loan in January 2022. After impressing on loan at Swindon, Tomlinson was awarded the EFL Young Player of the Month award for February 2022, contributing with three assists and a goal across the month. In January 2023, Tomlinson re-signed for Swindon on loan until the end of the season with a view to a permanent transfer, which later failed to materialise.

=== Milton Keynes Dons ===
On 1 September 2023, Tomlinson joined League Two club Milton Keynes Dons for an undisclosed fee. He made his debut the following day, coming on as a 63rd-minute substitute in a 3–1 away league defeat to Crewe Alexandra. Tomlinson scored his first goal for the club on 24 October 2023, in a 4–1 home league win over Bradford City.

Having become a regular part of the first-team, on 9 September 2024 Tomlinson signed an extended contract with improved terms. During the 2025–26 season he achieved promotion as the club finished second to return to League One. He was one of nine players released by the club at the conclusion of their contracts on 30 June 2026.

=== Cheltenham Town ===
In June 2026 it was announced that he would sign for Cheltenham Town on 1 July 2026.

== Career statistics ==
As of match played 3 October 2026

Appearances and goals by club, season and competition
Club	Season	League			FA Cup		EFL Cup		Other		Total	
Club	Season	Division	Apps	Goals	Apps	Goals	Apps	Goals	Apps	Goals	Apps	Goals
Brighton & Hove Albion	2018–19	Premier League	0	0	0	0	0	0	—		0	0
Bognor Regis Town (loan)	2018–19	Isthmian Premier Division	32	3	3	0	—		5 (Note: Three appearances in FA Trophy, two appearances in Alan Turvey Trophy)	0	40	2
Hungerford Town	2019–20	National League South	33	4	1	0	—		4 (Note: One appearance in FA Trophy, three appearances and one goal in Berks & Bucks Senior Cup)	1	38	5
Eastleigh	2020–21	National League	41	12	2	0	—		0	0	43	12
Peterborough United	2021–22	Championship	5	0	1	0	1	0	—		7	0
Peterborough United	2022–23	League One	2	0	0	0	2	0	2 (Note: Appearance(s) in EFL Trophy)	0	6	0
Peterborough United	2023–24	League One	2	0	0	0	2	0	0	0	4	0
Peterborough United	Total		9	0	1	0	5	0	2	0	17	0
Swindon Town (loan)	2021–22	League Two	10	1	—		—		—		10	1
Swindon Town (loan)	2022–23	League Two	7	1	—		—		—		7	1
Milton Keynes Dons	2023–24	League Two	36	7	0	0	0	0	3 (Note: One appearance in the EFL Trophy, two appearances in the League Two play-offs)	0	39	7
Milton Keynes Dons	2024–25	League Two	40	4	1	0	1	0	1	0	43	4
Milton Keynes Dons	2025–26	League Two	22	0	2	2	1	0	1	0	26	2
Milton Keynes Dons	Total		98	11	3	2	2	0	5	0	108	13
Cheltenham Town	2026–27	League Two	9	0	0	0	1	0	0	0	10	0
Career total			238	31	10	2	8	0	16	1	272	34

== Honours ==
Milton Keynes Dons

- EFL League Two runner-up: 2025–26

Individual

- Eastleigh Young Player of the Year: 2020–21
- Eastleigh Player of the Year: 2020–21
- EFL Young Player of the Month: February 2022
