= Callum Tripp =

Welsh footballer (born 2006)

Personal information
- Full name: Callum Maximillian Tripp
- Date of birth: 28 August 2006 (age 20)
- Place of birth: Milton Keynes, England
- Height: 1.95 m (6 ft 5 in)
- Positions: Centre-back; wing-back

Team information
- Current team: Milton Keynes Dons
- Number: 34

Youth career
- –2022: Milton Keynes Dons

Senior career*
Years	Team	Apps	(Gls)
2022–	Milton Keynes Dons	6	(0)
2024	→ St Albans City (loan)	2	(0)
2025	→ Gateshead (loan)	5	(0)
2025	→ Bedford Town (loan)	6	(1)
2026	→ Sutton United (loan)	2	(0)
2026	→ Brackley Town (loan)	0	(0)
2026–	→ Billericay Town (loan)	1	(0)

International career^{‡}
2025–	Wales U21	1	(0)
- * Club domestic league appearances and goals as of 20:27, 24 May 2026 (UTC) ‡ National team caps and goals as of 08:56, 20 March 2025 (UTC)

Callum Maximillian Tripp (born 28 August 2006) is a professional footballer who plays as a midfielder for National League South side Billericay Town, on loan from EFL League One club Milton Keynes Dons. He is also a Wales U21 international.

== Club career ==
=== Milton Keynes Dons ===
Tripp joined the academy of Milton Keynes Dons at a young age. He progressed through various academy age groups, and was an unused substitute for the first team at the age of just fifteen. He started a two-year scholarship at the start of the 2022–23 campaign. Head Coach Liam Manning said Tripp had "high potential" and "terrific character". He made his first-team debut on 30 August 2022, coming on as a half-time substitute in a 2–1 defeat to Cheltenham Town in an EFL Trophy fixture at the Stadium MK.

On 7 September 2023, at the age of 17, Tripp signed professional terms with the club. He made his professional league debut on 14 October 2023, coming on as a 79th-minute substitute in a 2–2 home draw with Barrow.

On 4 October 2024, Tripp signed a new improved contract.

On 21 January 2025, Tripp joined National League side Gateshead on loan for the remainder of the season, Then, later the same day, scored his first ever senior professional goal against Newcastle United U21s in the National League Cup

On 17 October 2025, Tripp joined National League North club Bedford Town on a one-month loan deal.

On 26 March 2026, he joined National League club Brackley Town on loan for the remainder of the season.

On 14 November 2026, he joined National League South side Billericay Town on loan, he came off the bench in a 3-1 Victory in his first match against Waltham Abbey in the FA Trophy

== International career ==
Born in England, Tripp is also eligible to play for Wales through his ancestry. In March 2025, he was called up to the Wales under-21 national team ahead of their friendlies against Andorra and Sweden. Tripp made his debut for the side on 20 March 2025, playing the first half in a 1–0 win over Andorra U21.

== Career statistics ==
As of 15 November 2026

Appearances and goals by club, season and competition
Club	Season	League			FA Cup		EFL Cup		Other		Total	
Club	Season	Division	Apps	Goals	Apps	Goals	Apps	Goals	Apps	Goals	Apps	Goals
Milton Keynes Dons	2022–23	League One	0	0	0	0	0	0	1 (Note: Appearance(s) in EFL Trophy)	0	1	0
Milton Keynes Dons	2023–24	League Two	1	0	0	0	0	0	2	0	3	0
Milton Keynes Dons	2024–25	League Two	5	0	0	0	1	0	1	0	7	0
Milton Keynes Dons	2025–26	League Two	0	0	1	0	0	0	3	0	4	0
Milton Keynes Dons	Total		6	0	1	0	1	0	7	0	15	0
St Albans City (loan)	2023–24	National League South	2	0	0	0	—		0	0	2	0
Billericay Town (loan)	2026–27	National League South	0	0	0	0	—		1	0	1	0
Total			2	0	0	0	0	0	1	0	3	0
Career total			8	0	1	0	1	0	8	0	18	0

== Honours ==
Individual

- EFL League Two Apprentice of the Season: 2023–24
