= 2024–25 St Johnstone F.C. season =

St Johnstone
2024–25 season
- Chief executive: Francis Smith
- Manager: Craig Levein (until 17 September); Andy Kirk (interim); Simo Valakari (from 1 October)
- Stadium: McDiarmid Park
- Scottish Premiership: Twelfth place (Relegated)
- Scottish Cup: Semi-finals
- League Cup: Second round
- Top goalscorer: League: Makenzie Kirk (8); All: Benjamin Mbunga Kimpioka (11)
- Highest home attendance: 9,203 vs. Aberdeen, Premiership, 5 August 2024
- Lowest home attendance: 1,872 vs. Kilmarnock, Premiership, 23 November 2024
- Average home league attendance: 5,680
Home colours	Away colours	Third colours

The 2024–25 season was St Johnstone's twelfth season in the Scottish Premiership and their sixteenth consecutively (following four in the former Scottish Premier League) in the top flight of Scottish football. Saints also competed in the Scottish Cup and the League Cup.

== Competitions ==
Win Draw Loss Postponed

=== Pre-season and friendlies ===
28 June 2024	Nairn County	1–6	St Johnstone	Nairn
20:00 BST	Greig 68'	Report	Mylchreest 24'; Parker 31'; Steven 71'; McClelland 74'; Keltjens 80'; May 90'	Stadium: Station Park; Referee: Harry Bruce

29 June 2024	Huntly	0–2	St Johnstone	Huntly
20:00 BST			May 3' (pen.); Ellison 77'	Stadium: Christie Park

6 July 2024	Arbroath	0–1	St Johnstone	Arbroath
20:00 BST		Report	McPake 52'	Stadium: Gayfield Park; Attendance: 1,043; Referee: Greg Soutar

=== Scottish Premiership ===
5 August 2024 1	St Johnstone	1–2	Aberdeen	Perth
20:00	Molloy 88' (o.g.)	Report	Devlin 22'; McGrath 62'	Stadium: McDiarmid Park; Attendance: 9,203; Referee: Kevin Clancy
Note: Game televised on Sky Sports

10 August 2024 2	Kilmarnock	0–3	St Johnstone	Kilmarnock
15:00	Wright (red card) 16'	Report	Sidibeh 3', 33'; Kimpioka 81' (pen.)	Stadium: Rugby Park; Attendance: 4,843; Referee: Chris Graham

24 August 2024 3	Dundee United	2–0	St Johnstone	Dundee
15:00	Stephenson 54'; Sanders 88' (o.g.)	Report	Sidibeh (red card) 84'	Stadium: Tannadice Park; Attendance: 7,806

31 August 2024 4	St Johnstone	1–2	Motherwell	Perth
20:00	Kimpioka 64'; Sanders (red card) 90+6'	Report	Casey 11'; Ebiye 90+4'	Stadium: McDiarmid Park; Attendance: 3,629; Referee: Iain Snedden

14 September 2024 5	Hibernian	2–0	St Johnstone	Edinburgh
15:00	Kukharevych 45+1'; Boyle 72'	Report	Kimpioka (red card) 89'	Stadium: Easter Road; Attendance: 15,448; Referee: Nick Walsh

21 September 2024 6	Ross County	3–3	St Johnstone	Dingwall
15:00	Hale 19'; Samuel 87'; Wright 90+7'	Report	Wright 44'; Clark 60', 84'	Stadium: Victoria Park; Attendance: 3,063; Referee: Dan McFarlane

28 September 2024 7	St Johnstone	0–6	Celtic	Perth
17:45		Report	Furuhashi 35', 45'; Bernardo 43'; McGregor 54'; Maeda 72'; Idah 83'	Stadium: McDiarmid Park; Attendance: 7,036; Referee: Don Robertson

6 October 2024 8	Rangers	2–0	St Johnstone	Glasgow
15:00	Černý 34', 58'; Hagi (red card) 81'	Report		Stadium: Ibrox Stadium; Attendance: 44,744; Referee: David Dickinson

18 October 2024 9	St Johnstone	3–0	Ross County	Perth
15:00	Kimpioka 16', 45'; Kirk 90+4'	Report	Campbell (red card) 31'; Telfer (red card) 78'	Stadium: McDiarmid Park; Attendance: 3,688; Referee: John Beaton

26 October 2024 10	Dundee	1–2	St Johnstone	Dundee
15:00	Murray 12'	Report	Carey 64'; Clark 90'	Stadium: Dens Park; Attendance: 6,548; Referee: Kevin Clancy

30 October 2024 11	St Mirren	3–1	St Johnstone	Paisley
19:45	Tanser 30'; O'Hara 57'; Ayunga 90+3'	Report	Kimpioka 8'	Stadium: St Mirren Park; Attendance: 6,042; Referee: Steven McLean

2 November 2024 12	St Johnstone	1–2	Heart of Midlothian	Perth
15:00	Clark 68' (pen.)	Report	Clark 23' (o.g.); Vargas 76'	Stadium: McDiarmid Park; Attendance: 5,917; Referee: Chris Graham

9 November 2024 13	Motherwell	2–1	St Johnstone	Motherwell
15:00	Maswanhise 20'; Sparrow 34'	Report	Clark 58' (pen.)	Stadium: Fir Park; Attendance: 4,306; Referee: Ross Hardie

23 November 2024 14	St Johnstone	1–0	Kilmarnock	Perth
15:15	Kirk 53'	Report	Donnelly (red card) 84'	Stadium: McDiarmid Park; Attendance: 1,872; Referee: Iain Snedden

30 November 2024 15	St Johnstone	0–1	Rangers	Perth
12:00		Report	Holt 63' (o.g.)	Stadium: McDiarmid Park; Attendance: 7,446; Referee: Steven McLean

7 December 2024 16	Aberdeen	1–1	St Johnstone	Aberdeen
15:00	Clarkson 56'	Report	Kirk 25'	Stadium: Pittodrie Stadium; Attendance: 15,880; Referee: Ross Hardie

14 December 2024 17	St Johnstone	2–3	St Mirren	Perth
15:00	Kirk 52'; Kimpioka 81'	Report	Phillips 10'; Mooney 88'; Idowu 90+9' (pen.)	Stadium: McDiarmid Park; Attendance: 4,001; Referee: Euan Anderson

22 December 2024 18	Heart of Midlothian	2–1	St Johnstone	Edinburgh
15:00	Penrice 16'; Spittal 58'	Report	Carey 53' (pen.)	Stadium: Tynecastle Park; Attendance: 18,676; Referee: John Beaton

26 December 2024 19	St Johnstone	1–2	Dundee United	Perth
15:00	Kirk 44'	Report	Middleton 51'; Dalby 60'; Gallagher (red card) 87'	Stadium: McDiarmid Park; Attendance: 7,306; Referee: Kevin Clancy

29 December 2024 20	Celtic	4–0	St Johnstone	Glasgow
15:00	Engels 45+1' (pen.); Maeda 57'; Kühn 74'; Hatate 81'	Report		Stadium: Celtic Park; Attendance: 58,645; Referee: Matthew MacDermid

2 January 2025 21	St Johnstone	1–1	Hibernian	Perth
15:00	Holt (red card) 41'; Clark 45+4' (pen.)	Report	Gayle 79'	Stadium: McDiarmid Park; Attendance: 6,287; Referee: Lloyd Wilson

5 January 2025 22	St Johnstone	1–3	Dundee	Perth
15:00	McPake 67'	Report	Murray 3'; Palmer-Houlden 10'; Cameron 22'	Stadium: McDiarmid Park; Attendance: 5,246; Referee: David Dickinson

12 January 2025 23	Rangers	3–1	St Johnstone	Glasgow
15:00	Igamane 16'; Černý 20'; Diomande 25'	Report	Sanders 54'	Stadium: Ibrox Stadium; Attendance: 45,818; Referee: Ross Hardie

25 January 2025 24	St Johnstone	2–1	Motherwell	Perth
15:00	Steven 86'; Mikulić 88'	Report	Halliday 4' (pen.)	Stadium: McDiarmid Park; Attendance: 3,892; Referee: Kevin Clancy

1 February 2025 25	St Mirren	0–1	St Johnstone	Paisley
15:00		Report	Mikulić 71'	Stadium: St Mirren Park; Attendance: 6,298; Referee: Dan McFarlane

15 February 2025 26	Kilmarnock	3–1	St Johnstone	Kilmarnock
15:00	Polworth 9'; Murray 56'; Wales 60'	Report	Carey 90+1'	Stadium: Rugby Park; Attendance: 5,479; Referee: Matthew MacDermid

23 February 2025 27	St Johnstone	1–2	Heart of Midlothian	Perth
12:00	Sidibeh 53'	Report	Kabangu 36', 57'	Stadium: McDiarmid Park; Attendance: 5,577; Referee: Calum Scott

26 February 2025 28	St Johnstone	1–0	Ross County	Perth
19:45	Kirk 66'	Report		Stadium: McDiarmid Park; Attendance: 3,576; Referee: Dan McFarlane

1 March 2025 29	Dundee	1–1	St Johnstone	Dundee
15:00	Murray 43'	Report	Kirk 40'	Stadium: Dens Park; Attendance: 7,681; Referee: Steven McLean

15 March 2025 30	St Johnstone	0–0	Aberdeen	Perth
15:00		Report		Stadium: McDiarmid Park; Attendance: 7,733; Referee: Chris Graham

29 March 2025 31	Hibernian	3–0	St Johnstone	Edinburgh
15:00	Hoilett 18'; Boyle 29'; Bowie 90+5'	Report		Stadium: Easter Road; Attendance: 17,002; Referee: Matthew MacDermid

6 April 2025 32	St Johnstone	1–0	Celtic	Perth
12:00	Balodis 4'	Report		Stadium: McDiarmid Park; Attendance: 8,795; Referee: David Dickinson

12 April 2025 33	Dundee United	1–0	St Johnstone	Dundee
15:00	Adegboyega 25'	Report		Stadium: Tannadice Park; Attendance: 10,160; Referee: Dan McFarlane

26 April 2025 34	Motherwell	3–2	St Johnstone	Motherwell
15:00	Slattery 39'; Sprangler 40' (o.g.); Sparrow 48'	Report	Kirk 6'; Watt 66'	Stadium: Fir Park; Attendance: 4,412; Referee: Steven McLean

3 May 2025 35	St Johnstone	0–2	Kilmarnock	Perth
15:00		Report	Watson 12'; Armstrong 53' (pen.)	Stadium: McDiarmid Park; Attendance: 5,191; Referee: Iain Snedden

10 May 2025 36	St Johnstone	2–1	Ross County	Perth
15:00	Balodis 31'; Watt 60'	Report	Samuel 41'; Ashworth (red card) 90+11'	Stadium: McDiarmid Park; Attendance: 4,355; Referee: John Beaton

14 May 2025 37	Heart of Midlothian	2–1	St Johnstone	Edinburgh
19:45	Douglas 17' (o.g.); Forrest 31'	Report	Carey 74'	Stadium: Tynecastle Park; Attendance: 18,021; Referee: David Dickinson

18 May 2025 38	St Johnstone	0–2	Dundee	Perth
15:00		Report	Cameron 28', 90+6' (pen.)	Stadium: McDiarmid Park; Attendance: 7,170; Referee: Steven McLean

=== Scottish League Cup ===
==== Group stage ====
13 July 2024 1	Brechin City	1–2	St Johnstone	Brechin
15:00	Moreland 90+1'	Report	Carey 45+2' (pen.); Cameron 65'	Stadium: Glebe Park; Attendance: 1,075; Referee: Craig Napier

20 July 2024 2	St Johnstone	2–0	Greenock Morton	Perth
15:00	Kimpioka 12', 44'	Report		Stadium: McDiarmid Park; Attendance: 2,403; Referee: Iain Sneddon

23 July 2024 3	Alloa Athletic	3–2	St Johnstone	Alloa
19:45	Neill 54'; Rankin 83', 88'	Report	Kimpioka 55'; Essel (red card) 64'; Sanders 90+1'	Stadium: Recreation Park; Attendance: 1,112; Referee: Colin Steven

27 July 2024 4	St Johnstone	5–1	East Fife	Perth
15:00	Sidibeh 15', 44'; Kimpioka 28', 90+1'; Kirk 88'	Report	Trouten 64'	Stadium: McDiarmid Park; Attendance: 2,424; Referee: Don Robertson

==== Knockout phase ====
17 August 2024 Second round	Rangers	2–0	St Johnstone	Glasgow
15:00	Dessers 61'; McCausland 90+2'	Report		Stadium: Hampden Park; Referee: Matthew MacDermid

=== Scottish Cup ===
18 January 2025 Fourth round	St Johnstone	1–0	Motherwell	Perth
15:00	Kirk 9'	Report		Stadium: McDiarmid Park; Attendance: 3,892; Referee: John Beaton

8 February 2025 Fifth round	St Johnstone	1–0	Hamilton Academical	Perth
15:00	Sidibeh 86'	Report		Stadium: McDiarmid Park; Attendance: 3,095; Referee: Nick Walsh

10 March 2025 Quarter-finals	Livingston	0–1	St Johnstone	Livingston
19:45		Report	Carey 73'	Stadium: Almondvale Stadium; Referee: Don Robertson

20 April 2025 Semi-finals	St Johnstone	0–5	Celtic	Glasgow
15:00		Report	McGregor 34'; Maeda 37', 45+1'; Idah 45'; Jota 67'	Stadium: Hampden Park; Attendance: 43,632; Referee: Calum Scott

== Squad statistics ==
=== Appearances and goals ===
As of 18 May 2025

No.	Pos	Nat	Player	Total		Premiership		Scottish Cup		League Cup	
No.	Pos	Nat	Player	Apps	Goals	Apps	Goals	Apps	Goals	Apps	Goals
1	GK	(England) ENG	Andy Fisher	18	0	14	0	4	0	0	0
2	DF	(Croatia) CRO	Božo Mikulić	16	2	13+1	2	2	0	0	0
4	DF	(Latvia) LAT	Daniels Balodis	16	2	13	2	3	0	0	0
5	DF	(England) ENG	Zach Mitchell	10	0	6+2	0	2	0	0	0
6	MF	(Panama) PAN	Víctor Griffith	14	0	9+2	0	3	0	0	0
7	MF	(Scotland) SCO	Jason Holt	31	0	26+2	0	3	0	0	0
8	MF	(Sweden) SWE	Jonathan Svedberg	7	0	4+1	0	2	0	0	0
9	FW	(Uganda) UGA	Uche Ikpeazu	5	0	2+2	0	0+1	0	0	0
10	FW	(Scotland) SCO	Nicky Clark	33	6	18+11	6	1+2	0	0+1	0
11	MF	(Republic of Ireland) IRL	Graham Carey	42	6	15+19	4	2+2	1	4	1
14	MF	(England) ENG	Drey Wright	38	1	31	1	2+1	0	4	0
16	FW	(The Gambia) GAM	Adama Sidibeh	39	5	21+10	2	2+1	1	2+3	2
17	MF	(Ukraine) UKR	Max Kucheriavyi	6	0	2+2	0	0	0	0+2	0
18	DF	(Northern Ireland) NIR	Sam McClelland	5	0	1	0	0	0	4	0
19	FW	(Scotland) SCO	Taylor Steven	20	1	5+9	1	1+1	0	1+3	0
20	GK	(Scotland) SCO	Ross Sinclair	10	0	10	0	0	0	0	0
21	MF	(Guyana) GUY	Stephen Duke-McKenna	14	0	8+3	0	2+1	0	0	0
22	MF	(Wales) WAL	Matthew Smith	25	0	16+4	0	0	0	4+1	0
23	MF	(Austria) AUT	Sven Sprangler	37	0	29+3	0	4	0	0+1	0
24	MF	(Scotland) SCO	Josh McPake	16	1	5+8	1	0+1	0	2	0
27	FW	(Northern Ireland) NIR	Makenzie Kirk	42	11	24+10	9	3+1	1	0+4	1
29	FW	(Sweden) SWE	Benjamin Mbunga Kimpioka	33	11	19+7	6	0+2	0	5	5
30	DF	(Scotland) SCO	Barry Douglas	19	0	13+3	0	3	0	0	0
31	GK	(Scotland) SCO	Craig Hepburn	0	0	0	0	0	0	0	0
37	DF	(Republic of Ireland) IRL	Sam Curtis	17	0	13	0	4	0	0	0
44	MF	(Scotland) SCO	Elliot Watt	9	2	6+2	2	1	0	0	0
46	MF	(Poland) POL	Fran Franczak	11	0	4+4	0	0	0	0+3	0
55	DF	(Scotland) SCO	Callan Hamill	1	0	0+1	0	0	0	0+0	0
Departures
3	DF	(Trinidad and Tobago) TTO	Andre Raymond	21	0	16+1	0	0	0	4	0
4	DF	(Scotland) SCO	Kyle Cameron	18	1	13+2	0	0	0	3	1
5	DF	(England) ENG	Jack Sanders	27	2	21+1	1	1	0	4	1
6	DF	(Scotland) SCO	Lewis Neilson	18	0	13+4	0	0	0	1	0
7	FW	(Scotland) SCO	Stevie May	1	0	0	0	0	0	0+1	0
8	MF	(Scotland) SCO	Cammy MacPherson	12	0	3+4	0	0	0	5	0
12	GK	(Scotland) SCO	Josh Rae	18	0	12+1	0	0	0	5	0
15	MF	(Ghana) GHA	Aaron Essel	18	0	9+6	0	0	0	3	0
21	MF	(Scotland) SCO	Connor Smith	2	0	0	0	0	0	1+1	0
28	MF	(Scotland) SCO	Alex Ferguson	0	0	0	0	0	0	0	0
32	DF	(Scotland) SCO	Liam Parker	1	0	0	0	0	0	0+1	0
33	DF	(Israel) ISR	David Keltjens	10	0	1+6	0	0	0	3	0
38	MF	(Scotland) SCO	Scott Bright	0	0	0	0	0	0	0	0
42	DF	(England) ENG	Oludare Olufunwa	0	0	0	0	0	0	0	0
45	FW	(Scotland) SCO	Jackson Mylchreest	0	0	0	0	0	0	0	0

== Team statistics ==
=== League table ===
Pos	Team	Pld	W	D	L	GF	GA	GD	Pts	Qualification or relegation (Note: Teams play each other three times (33 matches), before the league is split into two groups (the top six and the bottom six).)
8	Motherwell	38	14	7	17	46	63	−17	49	
9	Kilmarnock	38	12	8	18	45	64	−19	44	
10	Dundee	38	11	8	19	57	77	−20	41	
11	Ross County (R)	38	9	10	19	37	65	−28	37	Qualification for the Premiership play-off final
12	St Johnstone (R)	38	9	5	24	38	68	−30	32	Relegation to Championship

Rules for classification: 1) Points; 2) Goal difference; 3) Goals scored; 4) Head-to-head points; 5) Head-to-head goal difference; 6) Play-off (only if deciding champion, UEFA competitions qualification, second stage group allocation or relegation).
(R) Relegated

=== League Cup table ===
Pos	Team	Pld	W	PW	PL	L	GF	GA	GD	Pts	Qualification	STJ	ALL	EFI	GMO	BRE
1	St Johnstone	4	3	0	0	1	11	5	+6	9	Qualification for the second round	—	—	5–1	2–0	—
2	Alloa Athletic	4	2	1	0	1	7	5	+2	8		3–2	—	p0–0	—	—
3	East Fife	4	2	0	1	1	8	5	+3	7		—	—	—	3–0	4–0
4	Greenock Morton	4	2	0	0	2	3	6	−3	6		—	2–1	—	—	1–0
5	Brechin City	4	0	0	0	4	2	10	−8	0		1–2	1–3	—	—	—

Rules for classification: 1) goal difference, 2) goals scored, 3) away goals scored, 4) matches won, 5) away matches won, 6) drawing of lots.

== Transfers ==
=== In ===
Date	Player	Transferred from	Fee	Source
30 May 2024	(Uganda) Uche Ikpeazu	(England) Port Vale	Free	
10 June 2024	(Scotland) Josh Rae	(Scotland) Airdrieonians	Free	
20 June 2024	(Scotland) Josh McPake	(Scotland) Stirling Albion	Free	
20 June 2024	(England) Jack Sanders	(Scotland) Kilmarnock	Free	
8 July 2024	(Ghana) Aaron Essel	(Ghana) Bechem United	Free	
16 July 2024	(Trinidad and Tobago) Andre Raymond	(Portugal) Vilar de Perdizes	Free	
19 July 2024	(South Africa) Arran Cocks	(England) Brooke House College Football Academy	Free	
19 July 2024	(Northern Ireland) Makenzie Kirk	(Scotland) Heart of Midlothian	Undisclosed	
30 August 2024	(Scotland) Jason Holt	(Scotland) Livingston	Free	
15 October 2024	(Scotland) Barry Douglas	(Poland) Lech Poznań	Free	
15 October 2024	(Croatia) Božo Mikulić	(Albania) Partizani Tirana	Free	
10 January 2025	(Panama) Víctor Griffith	(Panama) Árabe Unido	Undisclosed	
24 January 2025	(Sweden) Jonathan Svedberg	(Sweden) Halmstads BK	Free	
28 January 2025	(Latvia) Daniels Balodis	(Latvia) FK RFS	Free	

=== Out ===
Date	Player	Transferred to	Fee	Source
31 May 2024	(Scotland) Cammy Ballantyne	(Northern Ireland) Linfield	Free	
31 May 2024	(Scotland) Callum Booth	(Scotland) The Spartans	Free	
31 May 2024	(Malta) James Brown	(England) Marine	Free	
31 May 2024	(Scotland) Andrew Considine	Retired		
31 May 2024	(Scotland) Ali Crawford	(Scotland) Greenock Morton	Free	
31 May 2024	(Scotland) Tony Gallacher	(Scotland) Hamilton Academical	Free	
31 May 2024	(Scotland) Chris Kane	(Scotland) Dunfermline Athletic	Free	
31 May 2024	(Scotland) Jack Willis	(Scotland) Queen's Park	Free	
19 June 2024	(Bulgaria) Dimitar Mitov	(Scotland) Aberdeen	Undisclosed	
24 June 2024	(Scotland) Liam Gordon	(Scotland) Motherwell	Free	
4 July 2024	(Trinidad and Tobago) Daniel Phillips	(England) Stevenage	Free	
5 July 2024	(Australia) Ryan McGowan	(Scotland) Livingston	Free	
17 January 2025	(Scotland) Connor Smith	(Scotland) Hamilton Academical	Undisclosed	
20 January 2025	(Israel) David Keltjens	(Israel) Ironi Tiberias	Free	
31 January 2025	(England) Jack Sanders	(England) MK Dons	Undisclosed	
13 February 2025	(Scotland) Brodie Dair	(England) Fulham	Undisclosed	
1 April 2025	(England) Oludare Olufunwa	(Finland) IF Gnistan	Free	

=== Loans in ===
Date	Player	Transferred from	Source
5 July 2024	(Scotland) Kyle Cameron	(England) Notts County	
30 July 2024	(Scotland) Lewis Neilson	(Scotland) Heart of Midlothian	
7 January 2025	(England) Andy Fisher	(Wales) Swansea City	
17 January 2025	(Republic of Ireland) Sam Curtis	(England) Sheffield United	
30 January 2025	(Scotland) Elliot Watt	(England) Burton Albion	
3 February 2025	(England) Zach Mitchell	(England) Charlton Athletic	
3 February 2025	(Guyana) Stephen Duke-McKenna	(England) Harrogate Town	

=== Loans out ===
Date	Player	Transferred to	Source
11 July 2024	(Scotland) Bayley Klimionek	(Scotland) Forfar Athletic	
19 July 2024	(South Africa) Arran Cocks	(Scotland) Forfar Athletic	
30 July 2024	(Scotland) Adam McMillan	(Scotland) Albion Rovers	
3 August 2024	(Scotland) Jackson Mylchreest	(Scotland) Forfar Athletic	
21 August 2024	(Scotland) Stevie May	(Scotland) Livingston	
23 August 2024	(Scotland) Liam Parker	(Scotland) Cove Rangers	
30 August 2024	(Scotland) Joe Ellison	(Scotland) Berwick Rangers	
30 August 2024	(Scotland) Taylor Steven	(Northern Ireland) Cliftonville	
11 September 2024	(Scotland) Alex Ferguson	(Scotland) Stirling Albion	
13 September 2024	(England) Oludare Olufunwa	(Scotland) Hamilton Academical	
13 September 2024	(Scotland) Connor Smith	(Scotland) Hamilton Academical	
8 October 2024	(Scotland) Ben McCrystal	(Scotland) Berwick Rangers	
8 November 2024	(Scotland) Scott Bright	(Scotland) Brechin City	
4 February 2025	(Scotland) Josh Rae	(Scotland) Raith Rovers	
23 February 2025	(Scotland) Cammy MacPherson	(United States) Tampa Bay Rowdies	
28 February 2025	(Trinidad and Tobago) Andre Raymond	(Scotland) Dunfermline Athletic	
2 April 2025	(Ghana) Aaron Essel	(United States) North Texas SC	

== See also ==
- List of St Johnstone F.C. seasons
