= Callum Paterson =

Scottish footballer (born 1994)

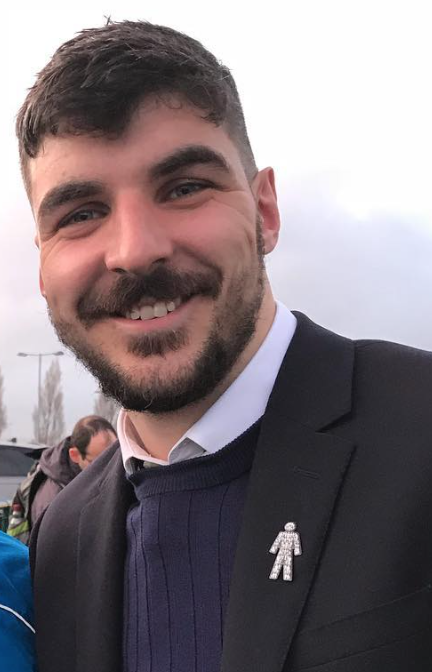
- Paterson in 2018

Personal information
- Full name: Callum Thomas Owen Paterson
- Date of birth: 13 October 1994 (age 32)
- Place of birth: Sutton, London, England
- Height: 1.83 m (6 ft 0 in)
- Position: Forward

Team information
- Current team: Milton Keynes Dons
- Number: 13

Youth career
- 2004–2010: Tynecastle Boys Club
- 2010–2012: Heart of Midlothian

Senior career*
Years	Team	Apps	(Gls)
2012–2017	Heart of Midlothian	137	(33)
2017–2020	Cardiff City	95	(19)
2020–2025	Sheffield Wednesday	160	(25)
2025–	Milton Keynes Dons	48	(20)

International career
2012	Scotland U18	1	(0)
2012	Scotland U19	1	(0)
2012–2015	Scotland U21	12	(2)
2016–2020	Scotland	17	(0)
- * Club domestic league appearances and goals as of 17:15, 21 November 2026 (UTC)

Callum Thomas Owen Paterson (born 13 October 1994) is a Scottish professional footballer who plays for EFL League One club Milton Keynes Dons as a forward. He previously played for Heart of Midlothian, Cardiff City and Sheffield Wednesday.

Paterson mainly played for Hearts as a right-back, but was also sometimes used as a striker. Cardiff mainly used him as a midfielder, but he occasionally played higher up the pitch to help aid the attack. He has been praised for his work rate, pace, aerial ability, positioning, and goalscoring prowess. He is also known for his array of goal celebrations, earning him the nickname Dr. Funk.

Paterson made 17 full international appearances for Scotland between 2016 and 2020.

== Early life ==
Paterson's father is Scottish and his mother is from Zimbabwe. His maternal grandfather is South African. Paterson was born in London and moved from there to Scotland when he was three years old. He grew up in South Queensferry where he attended Queensferry High School. He is the cousin of fellow footballer Michael Travis.

== Club career ==
=== Heart of Midlothian ===
Paterson began his career as a youth player at Tynecastle before joining Heart of Midlothian in 2010. A member of the club's Under-20 side he was promoted to the first team during pre-season in the summer of 2012 and made his first team debut on 14 July, in a friendly against Raith Rovers where he scored the first goal of the game. Having impressed during these pre-season fixtures, on 4 August he made his Scottish Premier League (SPL) debut aged 17, in a 2–0 win over St Johnstone. He made his European debut on 23 August, in a 1–0 defeat to Liverpool at Tynecastle.

On 31 August 2012, Paterson signed a new contract extending his stay with the club until 2015. On 22 September 2012, he scored his first two Career goals in a 3–0 win over Dundee Utd in the SPL. On 22 January 2013, Paterson suffered ligament damage to his foot in training that ruled him out of the Scottish League Cup Semi-final against Inverness that weekend. The injury required surgery and ultimately ruled him out for the remainder of the season. During his debut season Paterson made twenty seven appearances, scoring four times In doing so he played as a right-back, midfielder and as a striker, with the latter being the position he played in before joining Hearts.

On 11 August 2013, Paterson scored his first goal of the 2013–14 campaign, when he headed home the only goal in the Edinburgh derby against Hibernian at Tynecastle. On 27 April 2014, Paterson scored a brace against city rivals Hibernian in a 2–1 win. A week later he scored again in a 5–0 win over Kilmarnock and also scored three days later against Partick Thistle. Hearts were relegated at the end of the season, but immediately won promotion by winning the 2014–15 Scottish Championship. In their first season back in the top flight, Hearts finished third in the 2015–16 Scottish Premiership and qualified for European competition.

During the summer of 2016, Patterson was subject to interest from several EFL Championship sides, with Hearts rejecting two bids from Wigan Athletic. Despite the interest, he stayed at the club, managing to score 9 goals in 20 appearances, before suffering a serious knee injury on 27 December, which ruled him out for six to nine months. Despite missing the last few months of the season, Paterson managed to pick up the club's Young Player of the Year Award.

=== Cardiff City ===
On 7 June 2017, Paterson agreed a three-year deal with EFL Championship club Cardiff City. The knee injury suffered at Hearts kept him out of the first two months of the season, making his playing return for the Under-23 side in a 4–0 win over Burnley, on 18 September. On 21 October, Paterson returned to the first team, making his debut in a 1–0 win over Middlesbrough, before scoring his first goal for the club, the winner at Barnsley, a month later. Cardiff manager, Neil Warnock moved Paterson into a central midfield position in the new year, later stating the reasoning behind the move was because he couldn't defend. Following his move to the new position, Paterson scored a brace against Sunderland on 13 January and found the back of the net three times in March. He continued his good form throughout the rest of the season, scoring 10 goals, ending as the club's top goal scorer in the league, as they were promoted to the Premier League. Paterson was also voted Young Player of the Season by the Cardiff fans.

Paterson played his first Premier League game against Bournemouth on the opening day of the season. As Cardiff struggled for goals, Paterson was moved into a central forward role, where he scored his first Premier League goal in a 4–2 win over Fulham.

=== Sheffield Wednesday ===
On 30 September 2020, he joined EFL Championship club Sheffield Wednesday for an undisclosed fee. He made his club debut the following weekend against Queens Park Rangers and scored his first goal for the club against Brentford on 21 October 2020. He would win the clubs player of the month for January after scoring goals against Derby County and Exeter City as well as the final game in December against Middlesbrough.

On the opening day of the 2021–22 season against Charlton Athletic, he would suffer a nasty head injury following a collision after Paterson cleared a certain goal.

Following promotion back to the EFL Championship Paterson was offered a new contract to stay at the club which was signed on the 8 June 2023. On 9 February, manager Danny Röhl, confirmed that Paterson was facing an extended spell on the sidelines after undergoing surgery on a recent knee injury. On 17 May 2024, Wednesday exercised their option to keep Paterson another year.

He won the clubs player of the month for February 2025, after scoring goals against West Bromwich Albion and Sunderland. He was offered a new contract following the end of the 2024–25 season.

=== Milton Keynes Dons ===
On 28 July 2025, Paterson signed for League Two club Milton Keynes Dons. He made his debut for the club on 2 August 2025, the opening day of the 2025–26 season, in a 0–0 home draw with Oldham Athletic. He scored his first goal for the club in the following game, against Barrow, scoring the second goal in a 2–0 away win. On 24 January 2026, Paterson scored his first career hat-trick in a 5–1 home win over Shrewsbury Town.

Despite missing six weeks of the season due to injury, he was later nominated for the EFL Player of the Season award for League Two, having scored 14 goals and providing 8 assists up until 6 April 2026.

On 19 April 2026, Paterson was named in the EFL League Two Team of the Season for the 2025–26 campaign, alongside teammates Liam Kelly and Jack Sanders. A week later, he achieved the fourth promotion of his career as the club confirmed promotion to League One, with Paterson finishing the club's top scorer on 16 goals.

== International career ==
Paterson earned caps at both under-18 and under-19 level in 2012 before establishing himself as a regular in Scotland under-21 squads.

On 10 November 2014, manager Gordon Strachan called Paterson into the senior Scottish squad for the first time after Phil Bardsley pulled out of the squad injured, ahead of a European qualifier against the Republic of Ireland and a friendly against England. He made his senior debut for Scotland on 29 May 2016 in a 1–0 friendly defeat against Italy. Paterson made 17 appearances for Scotland between 2016 and 2020, with his most recent cap coming in the UEFA Euro 2020 qualifying play-offs against Serbia.

== Career statistics ==
=== Club ===
As of 21 November 2026

Appearances and goals by club, season and competition
Club	Season	League			National cup (Note: Includes Scottish Cup, FA Cup)		League cup (Note: Includes Scottish League Cup, EFL Cup)		Other		Total	
Club	Season	Division	App	Goals	App	Goals	App	Goals	App	Goals	App	Goals
Heart of Midlothian	2012–13	Scottish Premier League	22	3	1	0	2	1	2 (Note: Appearances in the Europa League)	0	27	4
Heart of Midlothian	2013–14	Scottish Premiership	37	11	1	0	4	0	0	0	42	11
Heart of Midlothian	2014–15	Scottish Championship	29	6	1	0	1	0	1 (Note: Appearance in the Scottish Challenge Cup)	1	32	7
Heart of Midlothian	2015–16	Scottish Premiership	29	5	3	1	4	1	0	0	36	7
Heart of Midlothian	2016–17	Scottish Premiership	20	8	0	0	1	1	0	0	21	9
Heart of Midlothian	Total		137	33	6	1	12	3	3	1	158	38
Cardiff City	2017–18	Championship	32	10	3	0	0	0	0	0	35	10
Cardiff City	2018–19	Premier League	27	4	1	0	1	0	0	0	29	4
Cardiff City	2019–20	Championship	36	5	4	2	1	0	1 (Note: Appearance in Championship play-offs)	0	42	7
Cardiff City	Total		95	19	8	2	2	0	1	0	106	21
Sheffield Wednesday	2020–21	Championship	43	8	2	1	0	0	0	0	45	9
Sheffield Wednesday	2021–22	League One	40	6	2	0	1	0	2 (Note: Appearance(s) in League One Play-offs & Football League Trophy)	0	45	6
Sheffield Wednesday	2022–23	League One	25	5	4	0	3	0	6	3	38	8
Sheffield Wednesday	2023–24	Championship	25	0	0	0	2	0	0	0	27	0
Sheffield Wednesday	2024–25	Championship	27	6	0	0	4	2	0	0	31	8
Sheffield Wednesday	Total		160	25	8	1	10	2	8	3	186	31
Milton Keynes Dons	2025–26	League Two	36	16	3	0	1	0	0	0	40	16
Milton Keynes Dons	2026–27	League One	12	4	1	0	1	0	1	1	15	5
Milton Keynes Dons	Total		48	20	4	0	2	0	1	1	54	21
Career total			439	96	26	4	26	5	13	5	504	110

=== International ===
Appearances and goals by national team and year
National team	Year	Apps	Goals
Scotland	2016	5	0
Scotland	2017	—	
Scotland	2018	6	0
Scotland	2019	1	0
Scotland	2020	5	0
Total		17	0

== Honours ==
Heart of Midlothian

- Scottish Championship: 2014–15

Cardiff City

- EFL Championship second-place promotion: 2017–18

Sheffield Wednesday

- EFL League One play-offs: 2023

Milton Keynes Dons

- EFL League Two runner-up: 2025–26

Individual

- Heart of Midlothian Young Player of the Year: 2016–17
- Cardiff City Young Player of the Year: 2017–18
- EFL League Two Team of the Season: 2025–26
- PFA Team of the Year: 2025–26 League Two

== See also ==
- List of Scotland international footballers born outside Scotland
