= 2025–26 Milton Keynes Dons F.C. season =

Milton Keynes Dons
2025–26 season
- Chairman: Fahad Al-Ghanim
- Head Coach: Paul Warne
- Stadium: Stadium MK
- League Two: 2nd (Promoted)
- FA Cup: Third round
- EFL Cup: First round
- EFL Trophy: Group stage
- Top goalscorer: League: Callum Paterson (16 goals); All: Callum Paterson (16 goals)
- Highest home attendance: 23,456 vs Harrogate Town (7 March 2026, League Two)
- Lowest home attendance: 1,036 vs Swindon Town (11 November 2025, EFL Trophy GS)
- Average home league attendance: 8,563
- Biggest win: 5–0 vs Cheltenham Town (H) (16 August 2025, League Two)
- Biggest defeat: 1–5 vs West Ham United U21 (H) (16 September 2025, EFL Trophy GS); 0–4 vs Swindon Town (H) (11 November 2025, EFL Trophy GS)
Home colours	Away colours	Third colours
- All statistics correct as of match played 2 May 2026.

The 2025–26 season was the 22nd season in the history of Milton Keynes Dons Football Club and their third consecutive season in League Two. In addition to the domestic league, the club also participated in the FA Cup, the EFL Cup and the EFL Trophy.

This was the first season since the club's founding not to feature Dean Lewington, who retired after 21 years at the club, serving between 2004 and 2025.

The club achieved promotion to League One after beating Tranmere Rovers 3–0 at Stadium MK on the penultimate weekend of the season.

== Transfers and contracts ==
=== In ===
Date	Pos.	Player	From	Fee	Ref.
11 June 2025	CF	Rushian Hepburn-Murphy (ENG)	Crawley Town (ENG)	£400,000	
19 June 2025	CF	Aaron Collins (WAL)	Bolton Wanderers (ENG)	£800,000	
30 June 2025	CM	Will Collar (ENG)	Stockport County (ENG)	Free transfer	
1 June 2025 (Note: The transfer was announced on 27 May, and became official on June 1 once the transfer window had reopened)	RW	Nathaniel Mendez-Laing (GUA)	Derby County (ENG)	Free transfer	
1 July 2025 (Note: The transfer was announced on 12 June, and became official on July 1 once his contract at Bolton had ended)	RB	Gethin Jones (AUS)	Bolton Wanderers (ENG)	Free transfer	
18 July 2025	GK	Tom Finch (ENG)	Norwich City (ENG)	Free transfer	
28 July 2025	CF	Callum Paterson (SCO)	Sheffield Wednesday (ENG)	Free transfer	
8 August 2025	CB	Marvin Ekpiteta (ENG)	Hibernian (SCO)	Undisclosed	
31 August 2025	RB	Kane Wilson (ENG)	Derby County (ENG)	Undisclosed	
8 January 2026	CAM	Ben Wiles (ENG)	Huddersfield Town (ENG)	Undisclosed	
9 January 2026	DM	Jay Matete (ENG)	Sunderland (ENG)	Undisclosed	
15 January 2026	CB	Curtis Nelson (ENG)	Derby County (ENG)	Undisclosed	

=== Out ===
Date	Pos.	Player	To	Fee	Ref.
27 June 2025	DM	Jay Williams (SKN)	Crawley Town (ENG)	Undisclosed	
18 August 2025	CF	Callum Hendry (SCO)	Motherwell (SCO)	Undisclosed	

=== Loaned in ===
Date	Pos.	Player	From	Date until	Ref.
26 August 2025	CB	Jon Mellish (ENG)	Wigan Athletic (ENG)	End of season	
2 February 2026	GK	Charlie Setford (ENG)	AFC Ajax (NED)	End of season	

=== Loaned out ===
Date	Pos.	Player	To	Date until	Ref.
11 July 2025	GK	Sebastian Stacey (ENG)	Worthing (ENG)	17 November 2025	
9 August 2025	LB	Marcel Guzynski (POL)	Banbury United (ENG)	6 September 2025	
1 September 2025	CB	Sam Sherring (ENG)	Cheltenham Town (ENG)	31 May 2026	
17 October 2025	RM	Callum Tripp (ENG)	Bedford Town (ENG)	17 November 2025	
4 November 2025	CDM	Keon Lewis-Burgess (ENG)	Billericay Town (ENG)	31 May 2026	
20 November 2025	CAM	Simone Troso (ENG)	Kings Lynn Town (ENG)	End of season	
12 December 2025	CAM	Revin Domi (ALB)	Bishop’s Stortford (ENG)	9 January 2026	
19 December 2025	CB	Charlie Waller (ENG)	Rochdale (ENG)	17 January 2026	
26 December 2025	LB	Marcel Guzynski (POL)	Potters Bar Town (ENG)	23 January 2026	
27 December 2025	GK	Ryan Kelly (ENG)	Newport Pagnell Town (ENG)	23 January 2026	
7 January 2026	RB	Phoenix Scholtz (NIR)	AFC Dunstable (ENG)	4 February 2026	
7 January 2026	CF	Rian Silver (ENG)	AFC Dunstable (ENG)	4 February 2026	
16 January 2026	CM	Kane Thompson-Sommers (ENG)	Bristol Rovers (ENG)	End of season	
16 January 2026	RM	Callum Tripp (ENG)	Sutton United (ENG)	12 February 2026	
20 January 2026	CF	Rian Silver (ENG)	Biggleswade Town (ENG)	TBC	
21 January 2026	CB	Charlie Waller (ENG)	Wealdstone (ENG)	End of season	
10 February 2026	CF	Michael Brammeld (ENG)	Banbury United (ENG)	TBC	
10 March 2026	GK	Sebastian Stacey (ENG)	Torquay United (ENG)	End of season	
26 March 2026	RM	Callum Tripp (ENG)	Brackley Town (ENG)	End of season	
26 March 2026	GK	Ryan Kelly (ENG)	Hitchin Town (ENG)	End of season	
29 March 2026	CF	Michael Brammeld (ENG)	Potters Bar Town (ENG)	End of season	

=== Released / Out of Contract ===
Date	Pos.	Player	Subsequent club	Join date	Ref.
30 June 2025	CB	Jack Tucker (ENG)	Colchester United (ENG)	1 July 2025	
30 June 2025	CF	Ellis Harrison (WAL)	Bristol Rovers (ENG)	29 July 2025	
30 June 2025	GK	Nathan Harness (ENG)	Maidstone United (ENG)	30 July 2025	
30 June 2025	CM	Joel Anker (ENG)	Banbury United (ENG)	8 August 2025	
30 June 2025	CB	Charlie Stirland (ENG)	Newton Aycliffe (ENG)	11 August 2025	
30 June 2025	GK	Ronnie Sandford (ENG)	Millwall (ENG)	7 November 2025	
30 June 2025	CB	Albert Wood (ENG)	Currently unattached		
30 June 2025	LB	Dean Lewington (ENG)	Retired		
30 January 2026	CB	Nathan Thompson (ENG)	Currently unattached		

=== New contracts ===
Date	Pos.	Player	Contracted until	Ref.
20 June 2025	RW	Jonathan Leko (ENG)	Undisclosed	
24 June 2025	GK	Connal Trueman (ENG)	Undisclosed	

== Pre-season and friendlies ==
The club's full pre-season schedule was announced on 4 June 2025. The club played just a single home match during pre-season as the Stadium MK pitch underwent a significant overhaul during the summer.

Win Draw Loss Fixtures

5 July 2025 Friendly	Milton Keynes Dons	1–2	St Mirren	San Pedro del Pinatar, Spain
11:00 CEST	Ayunga (o.g.)	Report	Idowu; Iacovitti	Stadium: Pinatar Arena

12 July 2025 Friendly	Hitchin Town	0–6	Milton Keynes Dons	Hitchin
15:00 BST		Report	Collins 8', 11' (pen.), 12'; Thompson 61'; Leko 87', 90'	Stadium: Top Field; Attendance: 730; Referee: Richard Wharton

15 July 2025 Friendly	Brackley Town	0–2	Milton Keynes Dons	Brackley
19:45 BST		Report	Collar 7'; Collins 89'	Stadium: St. James Park; Attendance: 1,066

19 July 2025 Friendly	Wealdstone	2–0	Milton Keynes Dons	London (Ruislip)
15:00 BST	Tiensia; Georgiou	Report		Stadium: Grosvenor Vale

19 July 2025 Friendly	Milton Keynes Dons	1–3	Doncaster Rovers	Dunstable
15:00 BST	Thompson-Sommers 28'	Report	Ajayi 17'; Molyneux 27'; Hanlan 33'	Stadium: Creasey Park

22 July 2025 Friendly	Milton Keynes Dons	Cancelled	Bristol City	Denbigh
19:30 BST				Stadium: Stadium MK
Note: On 1 July 2025, the fixture was cancelled due to the two clubs drawing one another in the League Cup first round. A replacement friendly against Peterborough United was also announced.

22 July 2025 Friendly	Milton Keynes Dons	1–2	Peterborough United	Denbigh
19:30 BST	Collins 16'	Report	Conn-Clarke 82'; Collins 87'	Stadium: Stadium MK; Attendance: 2,171 (339 away); Referee: Neil Hair

26 July 2025 Friendly	Stevenage	2–1	Milton Keynes Dons	Stevenage
15:00 BST	Kemp 45'; Reid 80'	Report	Hendry 85'	Stadium: Lamex Stadium; Attendance: 1,302 (296 away); Referee: Callum Gough

== Competitions ==
=== Overall record ===
Competition	First match	Last match	Starting round	Final position	Record							
Competition	First match	Last match	Starting round	Final position	Pld	W	D	L	GF	GA	GD	Win %
League Two	2 August 2025	2 May 2026	Matchday 1	2nd	46	24	14	8	86	45	+41	52.17
FA Cup	1 November 2025	9 January 2026	First round	Third round	3	2	1	0	7	4	+3	66.67
EFL Cup	12 August 2025		First round	First round	1	0	0	1	0	2	−2	0.00
EFL Trophy	16 September 2025	11 November 2025	Group stage	Group stage	3	0	0	3	1	10	−9	0.00
Total					53	26	15	12	94	61	+33	49.06

Last updated: 2 May 2026
Source: Soccerway

=== EFL League Two ===
==== League table ====
Pos	Team	Pld	W	D	L	GF	GA	GD	Pts	Promotion, qualification or relegation
1	Bromley (C, P)	46	24	15	7	71	46	+25	87	Promotion to EFL League One
2	Milton Keynes Dons (P)	46	24	14	8	86	45	+41	86	Promotion to EFL League One
3	Cambridge United (P)	46	22	16	8	66	33	+33	82	Promotion to EFL League One
4	Salford City	46	25	6	15	61	51	+10	81	Qualification for League Two play-offs
5	Notts County (O, P)	46	24	8	14	74	52	+22	80	Qualification for League Two play-offs

Source: EFL Official Website
Rules for classification: 1) Points; 2) Goal difference; 3) Number of goals scored; 4) Head-to-head results; 5) Wins; 6) Away goals; 7) Penalty points (sec 9.5); 8) 12-point sending off offences
(C) Champions; (O) Play-off winners; (P) Promoted

==== Results summary ====
Overall								Home						Away					
Pld	W	D	L	GF	GA	GD	Pts	W	D	L	GF	GA	GD	W	D	L	GF	GA	GD
46	24	14	8	86	45	+41	86	13	6	4	41	20	+21	11	8	4	45	25	+20

Last updated: 2 May 2026.
Source: Soccerway

==== Results by round ====
Round	1	2	3	4	5	6	7	8	9	10	11	12	13	14	15	16	17	18	19	20	21	22	23	24	25	27	28	29	30	31	32	33	34	35	36	26^{1}	37	38	39	40	41	42	43	44	45	46
Ground	H	A	H	A	A	H	H	A	H	A	H	A	H	A	A	H	A	H	A	H	A	H	H	A	H	A	H	H	A	A	H	H	A	A	H	A	A	H	H	A	H	A	H	A	H	A
Result	D	W	W	D	W	L	L	D	L	W	W	W	W	L	D	W	D	W	L	D	W	W	D	L	D	W	W	W	D	W	W	D	W	D	W	W	W	W	L	L	D	D	W	W	W	D
Position	15	6	3	5	3	7	9	10	14	9	6	4	2	4	4	3	4	3	5	5	5	4	4	6	5	5	3	2	4	4	5	4	3	3	2	2	2	2	2	2	2	2	2	2	1	2
Points	1	4	7	8	11	11	11	12	12	15	18	21	24	24	25	28	29	32	32	33	36	39	40	40	41	44	47	50	51	54	57	58	61	62	65	68	71	74	74	74	75	76	79	82	85	86

Updated to match(es) played on 2 May 2026. Source: Soccerway
A = Away; H = Home; W = Win; D = Draw; L = Loss; P = Postponed
Notes:
- ^{1} Matchday 26 (vs Gillingham) was postponed due to progression to the third round of the FA Cup.

==== Matches ====
The League Two fixtures were announced on 26 June 2025. The club began the season at home to newly promoted Oldham Athletic on 2 August with the final game of the regular season being away at Fleetwood Town on 2 May.

Win Draw Loss Fixtures

2 August 2025 1	Milton Keynes Dons	0–0	Oldham Athletic	Denbigh
15:00 BST	Sanders (yellow card) 55'	Report	Hannant (yellow card) 74'; Conlon (yellow card) 82'; Fondop (yellow card) 86'	Stadium: Stadium MK; Attendance: 9,384 (1,891 away); Referee: Matthew Russell

9 August 2025 2	Barrow	0–2	Milton Keynes Dons	Barrow-in-Furness
15:00 BST	Jackson (yellow card) 35'; Barkhuizen (yellow card) 58'; Fletcher (yellow card) 63'	Report	Mendez-Laing (yellow card) 26'; Jones (yellow card) 56'; Gilbey 73'; Paterson 81'	Stadium: Holker Street; Attendance: 3,218 (256 away); Referee: Michael Barlow

16 August 2025 3	Milton Keynes Dons	5–0	Cheltenham Town	Denbigh
15:00 BST	Sanders 9'; Gilbey 16'; Paterson 25'; Hepburn-Murphy 61'; Collar (yellow card) 74'; Nemane 80'	Report	Mažionis (yellow card) 5'; Jude-Boyd (yellow card) 42'; Bickerstaff (yellow card) 71'; Archer (yellow card) 83'	Stadium: Stadium MK; Attendance: 6,772 (365 away); Referee: Jacob Miles

19 August 2025 4	Crawley Town	1–1	Milton Keynes Dons	Crawley
19:45 BST	McKirdy (yellow card) 45+3'; Adeyemo 45+7', (yellow card) 59'; Cashman (yellow card) 53'; Anderson (yellow card) 72'	Report	Gilbey (yellow card) 54'; Offord 71'	Stadium: Broadfield Stadium; Attendance: 3,561 (599 away); Referee: Stephen Parkinson

23 August 2025 5	Newport County	1–2	Milton Keynes Dons	Newport
12:30 BST	Ogunneye 6'; Kamwa (penalty missed) 70'; Davies (yellow card) 83'	Report	Mendez-Laing 45+1' (pen.); Paterson 51'; Thompson (yellow card) 77'	Stadium: Rodney Parade; Attendance: 3,821 (325 away); Referee: Stuart Morland
Note: Fixture was originally scheduled for a 15:00 kick-off, but was moved for live Sky Sports broadcasting.

30 August 2025 6	Milton Keynes Dons	0–1	Walsall	Denbigh
15:00 BST	Offord (yellow card) 9'; Paterson (yellow card) 46'	Report	Harper (yellow card) 49'; Lakin 52'	Stadium: Stadium MK; Attendance: 7,261 (859 away); Referee: Sam Mulhall

6 September 2025 7	Milton Keynes Dons	2–3	Grimsby Town	Denbigh
15:00 BST	Offord (yellow card) 8'; Mellish (red card) 37'; McEachran 47' (o.g.); Kelly (yellow card) 74'; Lemonheigh-Evans 90+1'	Report	Green 10'; Kabia 23'; Vernam 29'; McEachran (yellow card) 86'	Stadium: Stadium MK; Attendance: 7,758 (1,188 away); Referee: Oliver Mackey

13 September 2025 8	Chesterfield	1–1	Milton Keynes Dons	Chesterfield
15:00 BST	Dobra (yellow card) 65'; Naylor 86'	Report	Hepburn-Murphy 25', (yellow card) 65'; Crowley (yellow card) 35'; Mendez-Laing (yellow card) 56'; Gilbey (yellow card) 68'	Stadium: SMH Group Stadium; Attendance: 8,127 (592 away); Referee: Edward Duckworth

20 September 2025 9	Milton Keynes Dons	1–2	Accrington Stanley	Denbigh
15:00 BST	Kelly (yellow card) 17'; Offord (yellow card) 45' (yellow-red card) 90+5'; Gilbey 48', (yellow card) 90+5'; Lemonheigh-Evans (yellow card) 52'	Report	Sinclair 19'; Heath (yellow card) 27'; Conneely (yellow card) 38'; Caton 74'	Stadium: Stadium MK; Attendance: 6,010 (86 away); Referee: Scott Jackson

27 September 2025 10	Shrewsbury Town	1–2	Milton Keynes Dons	Shrewsbury
15:00 BST	Ihionvien (yellow card) 38'; Hoole (yellow card) 45'; Aneke 77'	Report	Hogan 4'; Collar 39'	Stadium: New Meadow; Attendance: 4,854 (456 away); Referee: Martin Coy

4 October 2025 11	Milton Keynes Dons	3–2	Gillingham	Denbigh
12:30 BST	Gale 6' (o.g.); Mendez-Laing 57'; Maguire (yellow card) 63'; Paterson 69'; Leko (yellow card) 90+3'	Report	Smith (yellow card) 34'; Hutton (yellow card) 60'; Andrews (yellow card) 62'; Palmer-Houlden 76'; Williams 90+4'	Stadium: Stadium MK; Attendance: 7,646 (1,375 away); Referee: Darren Drysdale
Note: Fixture was originally scheduled for a 15:00 kick-off, but was rescheduled for live Sky Sports broadcasting.

11 October 2025 12	Bristol Rovers	0–4	Milton Keynes Dons	Bristol (Horfield)
15:00 BST	Southam-Hales (yellow card) 7'; Łopata (yellow card) 89'	Report	Kilgour 8' (o.g.); Ekpiteta (yellow card) 45'; Gilbey (yellow card) 74', (goal) 90'; Maguire 83'; Hepburn-Murphy 90+3'	Stadium: Memorial Stadium; Attendance: 7,996 (529 away); Referee: Scott Oldham

18 October 2025 13	Milton Keynes Dons	3–1	Crewe Alexandra	Denbigh
15:00 BST	Collar 23', (yellow card) 52'; Nemane (yellow card) 26'; Offord (yellow card) 36'; Gilbey 41', 57'; Paterson (yellow card) 50'	Report	Moult 90+10'	Stadium: Stadium MK; Attendance: 6,911 (483 away); Referee: Craig Hicks

25 October 2025 14	Bromley	2–1	Milton Keynes Dons	London (Bromley)
15:00 BST	Odutayo (yellow card) 43'; Elerewe 73'; Sowunmi 81'	Report	Hepburn-Murphy 5'	Stadium: Hayes Lane; Attendance: 3,694 (360 away); Referee: Kirsty Dowle

8 November 2025 15	Barnet	2–2	Milton Keynes Dons	London (Canons Park)
15:00 GMT	Senior 13'; Shelton 28' (pen.); Kanu (yellow card) 71'	Report	Sanders 39', (yellow card) 68'; Mendez-Laing (yellow card) 50', (goal) 65'; Paterson (yellow card) 71'; Thompson (yellow card) 90+4'	Stadium: The Hive Stadium; Attendance: 3,597 (1,342 away); Referee: James Durkin

15 November 2025 16	Milton Keynes Dons	2–0	Salford City	Denbigh
15:00 GMT	Mendez-Laing 45+2' (pen.); Sanders (yellow card) 70'; Paterson (yellow card) 90+2', (goal) 90+4'	Report	Harris (yellow card) 90+5'; Oluwo (yellow card) 90+5'	Stadium: Stadium MK; Attendance: 8,309 (163 away); Referee: Ross Joyce

22 November 2025 17	Tranmere Rovers	2–2	Milton Keynes Dons	Birkenhead (Prenton)
15:00 GMT	Whitaker 9', 27'; Finley (yellow card) 23'; Joseph (yellow card) 67'	Report	Leko (yellow card) 4' (yellow-red card) 79'; Mellish 78', (yellow card) 90+1'; Thompson-Sommers 82'	Stadium: Prenton Park; Attendance: 5,786 (330 away); Referee: Richie Watkins

29 November 2025 18	Milton Keynes Dons	2–1	Fleetwood Town	Denbigh
12:30 GMT	Mendez-Laing 37' (pen.), (yellow card) 62'; Ekpiteta (yellow card) 56'; Nemane 68'	Report	Evans 72'	Stadium: Stadium MK; Attendance: 6,221 (121 away); Referee: Andrew Humphries
Note: Fixture was originally scheduled for a 15:00 kick-off, but was rescheduled for live Sky Sports broadcasting.

9 December 2025 19	Notts County	3–2	Milton Keynes Dons	Nottingham
19:45 GMT	Dennis 8', (yellow card) 90+8'; Jatta 26'; Macari (yellow card) 45+4'; Iorpenda 88'	Report	Mendez-Laing 3', 13' (pen.); Nemane (yellow card) 36'; Offord (yellow card) 59'; Thompson-Sommers (yellow card) 90+5'	Stadium: Meadow Lane; Attendance: 8,872 (462 away); Referee: Aaron Farmer

13 December 2025 20	Milton Keynes Dons	1–1	Cambridge United	Denbigh
15:00 GMT	Maguire (yellow card) 15'; Paterson 42'; Thompson-Sommers (yellow card) 50'	Report	Knight (yellow card) 52'; Kaikai 66'	Stadium: Stadium MK; Attendance: 8,151 (1,729 away); Referee: James Oldham

20 December 2025 21	Harrogate Town	0–4	Milton Keynes Dons	Harrogate
15:00 GMT	Evans (yellow card) 14'; Cursons (yellow card) 78'	Report	Collins 15', 23'; Gilbey 29', 75'	Stadium: Exercise Stadium; Attendance: 2,923 (318 away); Referee: Declan Bourne

26 December 2025 22	Milton Keynes Dons	1–0	Swindon Town	Denbigh
15:00 GMT	Nemane 17'; Collar (yellow card) 38'	Report	Munroe (yellow card) 21'; Oldaker (yellow card) 53'	Stadium: Stadium MK; Attendance: 9,839 (1,797 away); Referee: Ben Atkinson

29 December 2025 23	Milton Keynes Dons	1–1	Notts County	Denbigh
19:45 GMT	Thompson-Sommers (yellow card) 8'; Gilbey (yellow card) 54'; Paterson 70'	Report	Iorpenda 44'; Dennis (yellow card) 67'; Hall (yellow card) 82'; Roos (yellow card) 90'	Stadium: Stadium MK; Attendance: 9,233 (1,936 away); Referee: Lee Swabey

1 January 2026 24	Colchester United	1–0	Milton Keynes Dons	Colchester
15:00 GMT	Payne 90+4' (pen.), (yellow card) 90+5'	Report	Offord (yellow card) 60'; Leko (yellow card) 90'	Stadium: Colchester Community Stadium; Attendance: 6,404 (487 away); Referee: Stephen Parkinson

4 January 2026 25	Milton Keynes Dons	2–2	Chesterfield	Denbigh
12:00 GMT	Nemane (yellow card) 26'; Paterson 29'; Hepburn-Murphy 45'; Sanders (yellow card) 54'; Mellish (yellow card) 58'; Kelly (yellow card) 79'	Report	Lewis (yellow card) 6'; Curtis 67'; Grigg 90+4', (yellow card) 90+4'	Stadium: Stadium MK; Attendance: 7,019 (1,029 away); Referee: Andrew Miller
Note: Fixture was originally scheduled for a 15:00 kick-off, but was rescheduled for live Sky Sports broadcasting.

17 January 2026 27	Accrington Stanley	0–2	Milton Keynes Dons	Accrington
15:00 GMT	Whalley (yellow card) 8'; Matthews (yellow card) 66'	Report	Wiles 14'; Collins 45+4'; Kelly (yellow card) 62'; Hogan (yellow card) 70'	Stadium: Wham Stadium; Attendance: 2,006 (325 away); Referee: Ross Martin

24 January 2026 28	Milton Keynes Dons	5–1	Shrewsbury Town	Denbigh
15:00 GMT	Paterson 8', 11' (pen.), 34'; Nemane (yellow card) 31'; Offord 81'; Crowley 88'	Report	Morgan (yellow card) 7'; Hoole (yellow card) 10'; Perry (yellow card) 40'; Sang 83'; Clucas (yellow card) 90+3'	Stadium: Stadium MK; Attendance: 7,336 (470 away); Referee: Alan Dale

27 January 2026 29	Milton Keynes Dons	1–0	Bristol Rovers	Denbigh
19:45 GMT	Paterson (yellow card) 27', (goal) 45+5'; Offord (yellow card) 40'; Kelly (yellow card) 90'	Report	Harbottle (yellow card) 28'; Conteh (yellow card) 89'; Sparkes (yellow card) 90'	Stadium: Stadium MK; Attendance: 6,503 (454 away); Referee: Craig Hicks

31 January 2026 30	Grimsby Town	2–2	Milton Keynes Dons	Cleethorpes
12:30 GMT	Vernam (yellow card) 35'; Kabia 64', 72'	Report	Paterson 22' (pen.); Ekpiteta 28'; Offord (yellow card) 75'; Matete (yellow card) 90+8'	Stadium: Blundell Park; Attendance: 6,246 (284 away); Referee: Kirsty Dowle
Note: Fixture was initially scheduled for a 15:00 kick-off, but was rescheduled for live Sky Sports broadcasting.

7 February 2026 31	Cheltenham Town	2–3	Milton Keynes Dons	Cheltenham
15:01 GMT	Bickerstaff 45+2'; Hutchinson 86'; Nurse (yellow card) 90+5'	Report	Offord (yellow card) 19'; Nelson 32'; Paterson 37'; Ekpiteta 64'; Gilbey (yellow card) 80'; Mellish (yellow card) 84'; Kelly (yellow card) 88'	Stadium: Whaddon Road; Attendance: 3,749 (624 away); Referee: Carl Brook

14 February 2026 32	Milton Keynes Dons	1–0	Newport County	Denbigh
15:00 GMT	Collins 1'; Paterson (penalty missed) 63'; Hepburn-Murphy (yellow card) 90+10'	Report	Spellman (yellow card) 22'; Sprangler (yellow card) 79'	Stadium: Stadium MK; Attendance: 7,444 (223 away); Referee: Harrison Blair

17 February 2026 33	Milton Keynes Dons	0–0	Crawley Town	Denbigh
19:45 GMT	Offord (yellow card) 31'	Report	Bajrami (yellow card) 1'; Williams (yellow card) 23'; Chapman (yellow card) 90+2'	Stadium: Stadium MK; Attendance: 7,036 (338 away); Referee: Isaac Searle

23 February 2026 34	Walsall	0–2	Milton Keynes Dons	Bescot
20:00 GMT	Pattison (yellow card) 26'; Flint (yellow card) 45'	Report	Hepburn-Murphy 30'; Crowley (yellow card) 44'; Mellish (yellow card) 58', (goal) 84'; Ekpiteta (yellow card) 69'	Stadium: Bescot Stadium; Attendance: 5,131 (485 away); Referee: Peter Wright
Note: Fixture was initially scheduled for 21 February, but was rescheduled for live Sky Sports broadcasting.

28 February 2026 35	Cambridge United	1–1	Milton Keynes Dons	Cambridge
12:30 GMT	Lavery 75'; Nevitt (yellow card) 83'	Report	Mellish (yellow card) 54'; Sanders (yellow card) 55'; Collins 90+6' (pen.)	Stadium: Abbey Stadium; Attendance: 7,538 (1,028 away); Referee: Declan Bourne
Note: Fixture was initially scheduled for a 15:00 kick-off, but was rescheduled for live Sky Sports broadcasting.

7 March 2026 36	Milton Keynes Dons	4–1	Harrogate Town	Denbigh
15:00 GMT	Sanders (yellow card) 26'; Hepburn-Murphy 30'; Offord 45+5'; Collins 51'; Wiles 63'	Report	Brenan 25'	Stadium: Stadium MK; Attendance: 23,456 (314 away); Referee: Alex Chilowicz

10 March 2026 26	Gillingham	1–5	Milton Keynes Dons	Gillingham
19:45 GMT	Hale (yellow card) 44'; Rowe (yellow card) 60'; Palmer-Houlden 77'; Cirino (yellow card) 90+5'	Report	Gilbey 15'; Crowley (yellow card) 23'; Jones 26'; Ekpiteta 33'; Wiles 51'; Kelly 87'	Stadium: Priestfield Stadium; Attendance: 4,706 (196 away); Referee: Harry Wager
Note: Fixture was postponed due to progression to the third round of the FA Cup.

14 March 2026 37	Swindon Town	1–2	Milton Keynes Dons	Swindon
15:00 GMT	Wright (yellow card) 30'; Hoilett (yellow card) 49'; Clarke 56'	Report	Gilbey 36'; Crowley (yellow card) 47'; Ekpiteta 79'	Stadium: The Nigel Eady County Ground; Attendance: 8,833 (923 away); Referee: Jamie O'Connor

18 March 2026 38	Milton Keynes Dons	1–0	Colchester United	Denbigh
20:00 GMT	Macey 39' (o.g.); Crowley (yellow card) 44'; Sanders (yellow card) 52'	Report	Lisbie (yellow card) 13'; Tovide (yellow card) 19'; Flanagan (yellow card) 72'; Payne (yellow card) 79'	Stadium: Stadium MK; Attendance: 6,285 (380 away); Referee: Sam Mulhall
Note: Fixture was initially scheduled for 17 March, but was rescheduled for live Sky Sports broadcasting.

21 March 2026 39	Milton Keynes Dons	1–3	Barnet	Denbigh
12:30 GMT	Mellish 7'; Hepburn-Murphy (penalty missed) 62'; Jones (yellow card) 90+1'	Report	Kanu (yellow card) 12', (goal) 57'; Crichlow (yellow card) 45'; Collinge 45+5'; Tshimanga 48'	Stadium: Stadium MK; Attendance: 7,944 (778 away); Referee: Dale Baines
Note: Fixture was initially scheduled for a 15:00 kick-off, but was rescheduled for live Sky Sports broadcasting.

28 March 2026 40	Salford City	1–0	Milton Keynes Dons	Salford
15:00 GMT	Butcher 66'; Graydon (yellow card) 86'	Report	Offord (red card) 85'; Mellish (yellow card) 86'; Gilbey (yellow card) 90+2'	Stadium: Moor Lane; Attendance: 3,177 (611 away); Referee: Thomas Parsons

3 April 2026 41	Milton Keynes Dons	0–0	Barrow	Denbigh
15:00 BST	Sanders (yellow card) 72'; Crowley (yellow card) 86'	Report	Harper (yellow card) 34'; Jackson (yellow card) 76'; Shipley (yellow card) 85'	Stadium: Stadium MK; Attendance: 7,503 (206 away); Referee: Martin Woods

6 April 2026 42	Oldham Athletic	1–1	Milton Keynes Dons	Oldham
15:00 BST	Fondop 84'	Report	Ekpiteta 30'; Gilbey (yellow card) 65'; Nelson (yellow card) 72'	Stadium: Boundary Park; Attendance: 8,920 (525 away); Referee: Steven Copeland

11 April 2026 43	Milton Keynes Dons	2–1	Bromley	Denbigh
12:30 BST	Mendez-Laing 1'; Wiles 17'; Nelson (yellow card) 18'; Mellish (yellow card) 66' (yellow-red card) 67'	Report	Sowunmi (yellow card) 67'; Medley (yellow card) 71'; Ifill 74'; Arthurs (yellow card) 86'	Stadium: Stadium MK; Attendance: 9,824 (1,067 away); Referee: William James Finnie
Note: Fixture was initially scheduled for a 15:00 kick-off, but was rescheduled for live Sky Sports broadcasting.

18 April 2026 44	Crewe Alexandra	1–3	Milton Keynes Dons	Crewe
15:00 BST	Sanders (yellow card) 59'; Thibaut 75'	Report	Nelson 12'; Ekpiteta 45+1'; Gilbey (yellow card) 60', (goal) 66'	Stadium: Mornflake Stadium; Attendance: 5,858 (1,087 away); Referee: Zac Kennard-Kettle

25 April 2026 45	Milton Keynes Dons	3–0	Tranmere Rovers	Denbigh
12:30 BST	Mendez-Laing 18'; Gilbey 21'; Paterson 78'	Report	Finley (yellow card) 66'; Bristow (yellow card) 77'	Stadium: Stadium MK; Attendance: 13,110 (622 away); Referee: Tom Reeves
Note: Fixture was initially scheduled for a 15:00 kick-off, but was rescheduled for live Sky Sports broadcasting.

2 May 2026 46	Fleetwood Town	1–1	Milton Keynes Dons	Fleetwood
15:00 BST	Coughlan 24'	Report	Paterson 37'	Stadium: Highbury Stadium; Attendance: 4,477 (1,239 away); Referee: Stephen Parkinson

=== FA Cup ===
The draw for the first round proper took place on 13 October 2025, with the club being drawn away to fellow League Two side Colchester United. In the second round draw, the club were drawn at home to another League Two side in Oldham Athletic. In the third round draw, the club were drawn at home to EFL Championship side Oxford United.

Win Draw Loss Fixtures

1 November 2025 First round	Colchester United	2–3	Milton Keynes Dons	Colchester
15:00 GMT	Mbick 26', (yellow card) 90+4'; Anderson 48'; Read (yellow card) 52'	Report	Hepburn-Murphy 37', 58'; Mellish (yellow card) 40'; Ekpiteta (yellow card) 45+1'; Offord (yellow card) 66'; Tomlinson 88'; Thompson-Sommers (yellow card) 90+1'	Stadium: Colchester Community Stadium; Attendance: 3,639 (265 away); Referee: Abigail Byrne

6 December 2025 Second round	Milton Keynes Dons	3–1	Oldham Athletic	Denbigh
15:00 GMT	Tomlinson 42'; Kelly 57'; Mellish (yellow card) 84'; Mendez-Laing 90+2'	Report	Robson (yellow card) 28'; Monthé (yellow card) 70'; Hannant 76' (pen.); Fondop (yellow card) 84'	Stadium: Stadium MK; Attendance: 3,065 (756 away); Referee: Zac Kennard-Kettle

9 January 2026 Third round	Milton Keynes Dons	1–1 (3–4 p)	Oxford United	Denbigh
19:30 GMT	Collins 34'; Paterson (yellow card) 96'	Report	Lankshear 52'	Stadium: Stadium MK; Attendance: 5,902 (2,080 away); Referee: Paul Howard
	Penalties
	(penalty scored) Sanders; (penalty missed) Leko; (penalty scored) Matete; (penalty scored) Paterson; (penalty missed) Lemonheigh-Evans		(penalty scored) Romeny; (penalty scored) Harris; (penalty scored) Peart-Harris; (penalty scored) Phillips

=== EFL Cup ===
The draw for the first round was made on 26 June 2025, with MK Dons being drawn away to EFL Championship side Bristol City.

Win Draw Loss Fixtures

12 August 2025 First round	Bristol City	2–0	Milton Keynes Dons	Bristol
19:45 BST	Knight 6'; Hirakawa 61'	Report	Thompson (yellow card) 31'; Hogan (yellow card) 54'	Stadium: Ashton Gate; Attendance: 10,280 (371 away); Referee: Bobby Madley

=== EFL Trophy ===
In the group stage, MK Dons were drawn into Southern Group D alongside Reading, Swindon Town and West Ham United U21.

Pos	Div	Team	Pld	W	PW	PL	L	GF	GA	GD	Pts	Qualification
1	L2	Swindon Town	3	2	0	0	1	9	5	+4	6	Advance to Round 2
2	ACA	West Ham United U21	3	2	0	0	1	9	6	+3	6	Advance to Round 2
3	L1	Reading	3	2	0	0	1	6	4	+2	6	
4	L2	Milton Keynes Dons	3	0	0	0	3	1	10	−9	0	

Source: EFL

Win Draw Loss Fixtures

16 September 2025 Group stage	Milton Keynes Dons	1–5	West Ham United U21	Denbigh
19:00 BST	Lewis-Burgess (yellow card) 54'; Collins 67' (pen.); Mellish (yellow card) 77'	Report	Potts (yellow card) 3'; Fearon 12', 39'; Maguire 43' (o.g.); Marshall 71', 90+8'	Stadium: Stadium MK; Attendance: 1,074 (129 away); Referee: Aaron Farmer

7 October 2025 Group stage	Reading	1–0	Milton Keynes Dons	Reading
19:00 BST	Spencer (yellow card) 31'; Lane (yellow card) 32'; Patton 88'	Report	Lewis-Burgess (yellow card) 38'; Troso (yellow card) 71'; Thompson-Sommers (yellow card) 74'	Stadium: Select Car Leasing Stadium; Attendance: 1,623 (109 away); Referee: David Rock

11 November 2025 Group stage	Milton Keynes Dons	0–4	Swindon Town	Denbigh
19:00 GMT	Medwynter (yellow card) 45+6'	Report	Clarke 11', (yellow card) 14'; Drinan 32' (pen.), 35', 71'; Bodin (yellow card) 38'; Munroe (yellow card) 73'; Mabete (yellow card) 90+2'	Stadium: Stadium MK; Attendance: 1,036 (247 away); Referee: Elliot Swallow

== Statistics ==
=== Appearances and goals ===
As of match played 2 May 2026

Players with no appearances are not included in the list
Italics indicate a loaned in player

No.	Pos	Nat	Player	Total		League Two		FA Cup		EFL Cup		EFL Trophy	
No.	Pos	Nat	Player	Apps	Goals	Apps	Goals	Apps	Goals	Apps	Goals	Apps	Goals
1	GK	(Scotland) SCO	Craig MacGillivray	47	0	45	0	2	0	0	0	0	0
2	DF	(Australia) AUS	Gethin Jones	37	1	27+8	1	2	0	0	0	0	0
6	MF	(Republic of Ireland) IRL	Liam Kelly	49	2	42+3	1	2+1	1	1	0	0	0
7	MF	(England) ENG	Daniel Crowley	33	1	13+17	1	2	0	0	0	1	0
8	MF	(England) ENG	Alex Gilbey (captain)	46	12	44	12	0+1	0	0+1	0	0	0
9	FW	(Republic of Ireland) IRL	Scott Hogan	22	1	2+18	1	1	0	1	0	0	0
10	FW	(Wales) WAL	Aaron Collins	32	8	18+11	6	2	1	0	0	1	1
11	FW	(Guatemala) GUA	Nathaniel Mendez-Laing	27	10	22+3	9	1+1	1	0	0	0	0
12	DF	(England) ENG	Kane Wilson	1	0	1	0	0	0	0	0	0	0
13	FW	(Scotland) SCO	Callum Paterson	40	16	33+3	16	1+2	0	0+1	0	0	0
14	DF	(England) ENG	Joe Tomlinson	26	2	11+11	0	1+1	2	0+1	0	1	0
15	DF	(England) ENG	Luke Offord	45	3	39+2	3	3	0	0+1	0	0	0
16	MF	(France) FRA	Aaron Nemane	42	3	23+15	3	2+1	0	1	0	0	0
17	FW	(England) ENG	Jonathan Leko	22	0	1+16	0	0+1	0	1	0	3	0
18	MF	(England) ENG	Will Collar	26	2	13+9	2	2	0	1	0	1	0
20	MF	(England) ENG	Kane Thompson-Sommers	25	1	6+13	1	2+1	0	0	0	2+1	0
21	DF	(England) ENG	Marvin Ekpiteta	44	6	38+3	6	1+1	0	1	0	0	0
22	DF	(England) ENG	Jon Mellish	38	3	28+6	3	1+1	0	0	0	1+1	0
23	DF	(England) ENG	Laurence Maguire	10	1	5+2	1	1	0	0	0	2	0
24	MF	(Wales) WAL	Connor Lemonheigh-Evans	27	1	4+21	1	1	0	1	0	0	0
25	DF	(England) ENG	Curtis Nelson	18	2	16+2	2	0	0	0	0	0	0
26	MF	(England) ENG	Ben Wiles	22	4	21	4	1	0	0	0	0	0
27	GK	(England) ENG	Connal Trueman	7	0	1+1	0	1	0	1	0	3	0
28	MF	(England) ENG	Jay Matete	7	0	2+4	0	0+1	0	0	0	0	0
29	FW	(England) ENG	Rushian Hepburn-Murphy	38	9	19+17	7	1	2	1	0	0	0
32	DF	(England) ENG	Jack Sanders	39	2	32+3	2	3	0	0+1	0	0	0
34	MF	(England) ENG	Callum Tripp	4	0	0	0	0+1	0	0	0	3	0
35	DF	(England) ENG	Charlie Waller	1	0	0	0	0	0	1	0	0	0
38	MF	(England) ENG	Keon Lewis-Burgess	2	0	0	0	0	0	0	0	2	0
40	DF	(Albania) ALB	Revin Domi	3	0	0	0	0	0	0	0	1+2	0
42	MF	(England) ENG	Rian Silver	2	0	0	0	0	0	0	0	0+2	0
43	MF	(England) ENG	Dylan Fry	1	0	0	0	0	0	0	0	0+1	0
44	MF	(England) ENG	Damerai Singh-Hurditt	1	0	0	0	0	0	0	0	1	0
45	DF	(England) ENG	Kobe Sinclair-Linton	1	0	0	0	0	0	0	0	1	0
46	DF	(England) ENG	Jack Burke	3	0	0	0	0+1	0	0	0	1+1	0
47	MF	(England) ENG	Simone Troso	2	0	0	0	0	0	0	0	2	0
48	DF	(Poland) POL	Marcel Guzynski	3	0	0	0	0	0	0	0	1+2	0
49	FW	(England) ENG	Chase Medwynter	3	0	0	0	0	0	0	0	3	0
52	MF	(England) ENG	Laike Favier	1	0	0	0	0	0	0	0	0+1	0
53	MF	(England) ENG	Kian Osborne	1	0	0	0	0	0	0	0	0+1	0
55	MF	(England) ENG	Ben Nash	1	0	0	0	0	0	0	0	0+1	0
Player(s) who featured but departed the club permanently during the season:
4	DF	(England) ENG	Nathan Thompson	9	0	0+5	0	0+1	0	1	0	2	0

=== Disciplinary record ===
As of match played 2 May 2026

List is sorted by squad number when total number of cards are equal
Players with no cards are not included in the list

No.	Pos.	Nat.	Player	League Two			FA Cup			EFL Cup			EFL Trophy			Total		
No.	Pos.	Nat.	Player	Yellow card	Second yellow card	Red card	Yellow card	Second yellow card	Red card	Yellow card	Second yellow card	Red card	Yellow card	Second yellow card	Red card	Yellow card	Second yellow card	Red card
15	DF	(England)	Luke Offord	9	1	1	1	0	0	0	0	0	0	0	0	10	1	1
22	DF	(England)	Jon Mellish	6	1	1	2	0	0	0	0	0	1	0	0	9	1	1
8	MF	(England)	Alex Gilbey	9	0	0	0	0	0	0	0	0	0	0	0	9	0	0
32	DF	(England)	Jack Sanders	8	0	0	0	0	0	0	0	0	0	0	0	8	0	0
6	MF	(Republic of Ireland)	Liam Kelly	6	0	0	0	0	0	0	0	0	0	0	0	6	0	0
7	MF	(England)	Daniel Crowley	6	0	0	0	0	0	0	0	0	0	0	0	6	0	0
13	FW	(Scotland)	Callum Paterson	5	0	0	1	0	0	0	0	0	0	0	0	6	0	0
20	MF	(England)	Kane Thompson-Sommers	3	0	0	1	0	0	0	0	0	1	0	0	5	0	0
11	FW	(Guatemala)	Nathaniel Mendez-Laing	4	0	0	0	0	0	0	0	0	0	0	0	4	0	0
16	MF	(France)	Aaron Nemane	4	0	0	0	0	0	0	0	0	0	0	0	4	0	0
21	DF	(England)	Marvin Ekpiteta	3	0	0	1	0	0	0	0	0	0	0	0	4	0	0
4	DF	(England)	Nathan Thompson	2	0	0	0	0	0	1	0	0	0	0	0	3	0	0
17	FW	(England)	Jonathan Leko	2	1	0	0	0	0	0	0	0	0	0	0	2	1	0
18	MF	(England)	Will Collar	3	0	0	0	0	0	0	0	0	0	0	0	3	0	0
2	DF	(Australia)	Gethin Jones	2	0	0	0	0	0	0	0	0	0	0	0	2	0	0
9	FW	(Republic of Ireland)	Scott Hogan	1	0	0	0	0	0	1	0	0	0	0	0	2	0	0
23	DF	(England)	Laurence Maguire	2	0	0	0	0	0	0	0	0	0	0	0	2	0	0
25	DF	(England)	Curtis Nelson	2	0	0	0	0	0	0	0	0	0	0	0	2	0	0
29	FW	(England)	Rushian Hepburn-Murphy	2	0	0	0	0	0	0	0	0	0	0	0	2	0	0
38	MF	(England)	Keon Lewis-Burgess	0	0	0	0	0	0	0	0	0	2	0	0	2	0	0
24	MF	(Wales)	Connor Lemonheigh-Evans	1	0	0	0	0	0	0	0	0	0	0	0	1	0	0
28	MF	(England)	Jay Matete	1	0	0	0	0	0	0	0	0	0	0	0	1	0	0
47	MF	(England)	Simone Troso	0	0	0	0	0	0	0	0	0	1	0	0	1	0	0
49	FW	(England)	Chase Medwynter	0	0	0	0	0	0	0	0	0	1	0	0	1	0	0
Totals				81	3	2	6	0	0	2	0	0	6	0	0	94	3	2

=== Awards ===
==== MK Dons Player of the Month ====
The winner of the award was chosen via a poll on the club's official website.

Pos	Nat	Player	Month	Ref				
Pos	Nat	Player	Month	Ref	DF	(England)	Jack Sanders	August 2025
CF	(Scotland)	Callum Paterson	September 2025					
MF	(France)	Aaron Nemane	October 2025					
FW	(Guatemala)	Nathaniel Mendez-Laing	November 2025					
DF	(England)	Jack Sanders	December 2025					
CF	(Scotland)	Callum Paterson	January 2026					
MF	(Republic of Ireland)	Liam Kelly	February 2026					
DF	(England)	Marvin Ekpiteta	March 2026					

==== EFL League Two Team of the Season ====
On 19 April 2026, three Milton Keynes Dons players, Liam Kelly, Callum Paterson and Jack Sanders, were named in the EFL League Two Team of the Season at the 2026 EFL Awards.
