= Jack Sanders (English footballer) =

English footballer (born 1999)

Personal information
- Full name: Jack Tom Sanders
- Date of birth: 15 March 1999 (age 27)
- Place of birth: Bolton, England
- Height: 1.93 m (6 ft 4 in)
- Position: Central defender

Team information
- Current team: Milton Keynes Dons
- Number: 32

Senior career*
Years	Team	Apps	(Gls)
2017–2018	Charnock Richard		
2018–2019	Leek Town		
2019–2021	Wigan Athletic	0	(0)
2020	→ Blyth Spartans (loan)	11	(0)
2020	→ Southport (loan)	3	(0)
2020–2021	→ AFC Fylde (loan)	5	(0)
2021–2024	Kilmarnock	18	(1)
2022–2023	→ Cove Rangers (loan)	12	(1)
2024	→ Ayr United (loan)	14	(1)
2024–2025	St Johnstone	22	(1)
2025–	Milton Keynes Dons	59	(4)
- * Club domestic league appearances and goals as of 12:09, 22 November 2026 (UTC)

Jack Tom Sanders (born 18 March 1999) is an English professional footballer who plays as a central defender for EFL League One club Milton Keynes Dons.

== Career ==
=== Early career ===
Born in Bolton, Sanders spent his early career in non-league football with Charnock Richard and Leek Town, before turning professional with Wigan Athletic in July 2019. He moved on loan to Blyth Spartans in December 2019, and to Southport in February 2020.

In October 2020 he joined AFC Fylde on loan, with the loan ending in February 2021.

=== Kilmarnock ===
He signed for Scottish club Kilmarnock in June 2021. He began playing regularly under manager Derek McInnes.

In September 2022 he moved on loan to Cove Rangers, being recalled in January 2023.

In June 2023, he signed a new one-year contract with Kilmarnock.

In January 2024 he moved on loan to Ayr United, saying he was looking forward to working with Scott Brown. During the loan spell his father would regularly drive up from Bolton to watch him play, a seven-hour round journey.

=== St Johnstone ===
Sanders signed for St Johnstone in June 2024.

=== Milton Keynes Dons ===
On 31 January 2025, Sanders returned to England, joining League Two side Milton Keynes Dons. He made his debut on 1 February 2025, in a 2–1 away defeat to Doncaster Rovers. On 22 March 2025, Sanders scored his first goal for the club in a 1–0 away win over Cheltenham Town.

On 19 April 2026, following an impressive second season, Sanders was named in the EFL League Two Team of the Season for the 2025–26 campaign, alongside teammates Liam Kelly and Callum Paterson. A week later Sanders earned promotion as the club finished in second place and earned a return to League One.

== Career statistics ==
As of 21 November 2026

Appearances and goals by club, season and competition
Club	Season	League			FA Cup		League Cup		Other		Total	
Club	Season	Division	Apps	Goals	Apps	Goals	Apps	Goals	Apps	Goals	Apps	Goals
Wigan Athletic	2019–20	Championship	0	0	0	0	0	0	—		0	0
Wigan Athletic	2020–21	League One	0	0	—		0	0	0	0	0	0
Wigan Athletic	Total		0	0	0	0	0	0	0	0	0	0
Blyth Spartans (loan)	2019–20	National League North	11	0	—		0	0	0	0	11	0
Southport (loan)	2019–20	National League North	3	0	—		0	0	0	0	3	0
AFC Fylde (loan)	2020–21	National League North	5	0	1	0	—		1 (Note: Appearance in FA Trophy)	1	7	1
Kilmarnock	2021–22	Scottish Championship	14	1	2	0	2	0	2 (Note: Appearance(s) in Scottish Challenge Cup)	2	20	3
Kilmarnock	2022–23	Scottish Premiership	4	0	1	0	1	0	1	0	7	0
Kilmarnock	2023–24	Scottish Premiership	0	0	0	0	1	0	1	0	2	0
Kilmarnock	Total		18	1	3	0	4	0	4	2	29	3
Cove Rangers (loan)	2022–23	Scottish Championship	12	1	—		—		—		12	1
Ayr United (loan)	2023–24	Scottish Championship	14	1	—		—		—		14	1
St Johnstone	2024–25	Scottish Premiership	22	2	1	0	4	1	0	0	27	3
Milton Keynes Dons	2024–25	League Two	13	1	—		—		—		13	1
Milton Keynes Dons	2025–26	League Two	35	2	3	0	1	0	0	0	39	2
Milton Keynes Dons	2026–27	League One	11	1	1	0	0	0	2 (Note: Appearances in the EFL Trophy)	1	14	2
Milton Keynes Dons	Total		59	4	4	0	1	0	2	1	66	5
Career total			144	9	9	0	9	1	7	4	169	14

== Honours ==
Milton Keynes Dons

- EFL League Two runner-up: 2025–26

Individual

- EFL League Two Team of the Season: 2025–26
- PFA Team of the Year: 2025–26 League Two
