= Luke Offord =

English footballer (born 1999)

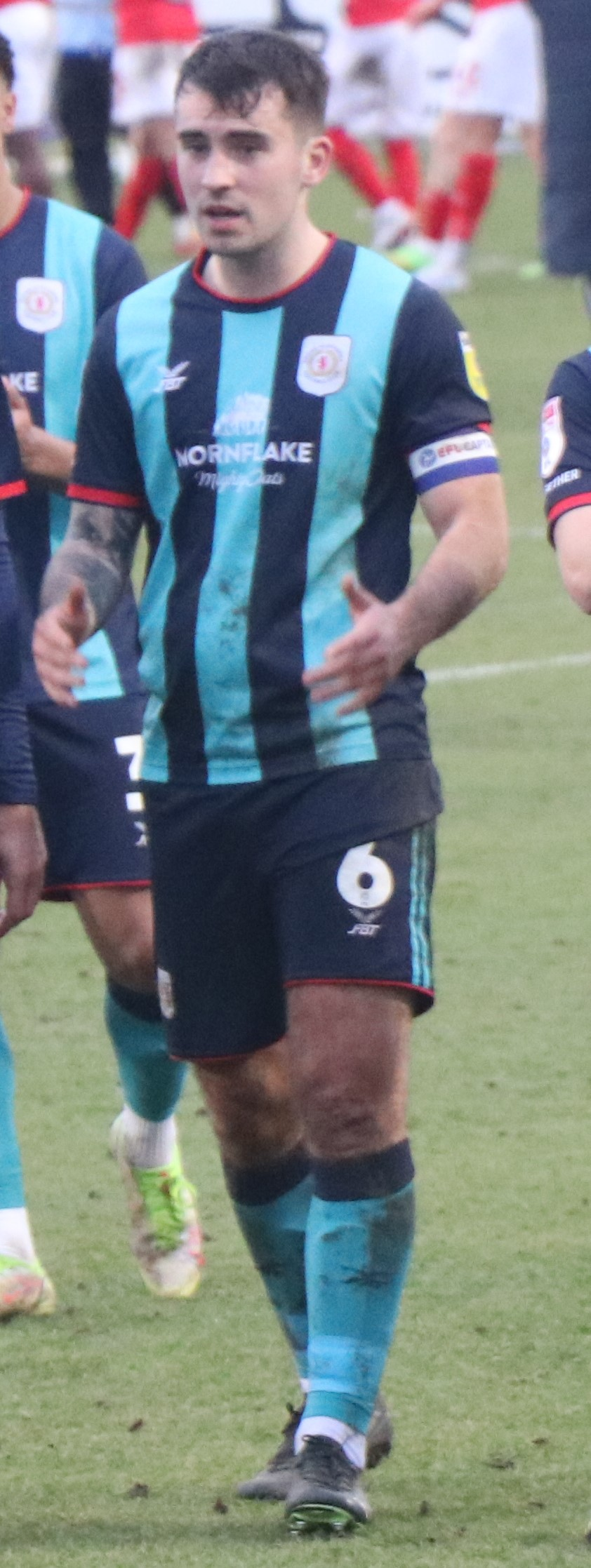
- Offord with Crewe Alexandra in 2023

Personal information
- Full name: Luke William Offord
- Date of birth: 19 November 1999 (age 26)
- Place of birth: Chichester, England
- Height: 6 ft 0 in (1.83 m)
- Position: Defender

Team information
- Current team: Crewe Alexandra
- Number: 6

Youth career
- –2017: Crewe Alexandra

Senior career*
Years	Team	Apps	(Gls)
2017–2024	Crewe Alexandra	152	(2)
2019	→ Witton Albion (loan)	8	(0)
2019–2020	→ Nantwich Town (loan)	7	(0)
2024–2026	Milton Keynes Dons	83	(6)
2026–	Crewe Alexandra	15	(1)
- * Club domestic league appearances and goals as of 13:57, 15 November 2026 (UTC)

Luke William Offord (born 19 November 1999) is an English professional footballer who is in his second spell playing as a defender for EFL League Two club Crewe Alexandra. He has previously also played for Witton Albion and Nantwich Town (both on loan) and Milton Keynes Dons.

== Career ==
=== Crewe Alexandra ===
Offord graduated from Crewe's academy in summer 2018. He was given a two-year contract (with an optional two-year extension) in May 2019 having spent time on loan at Witton Albion.

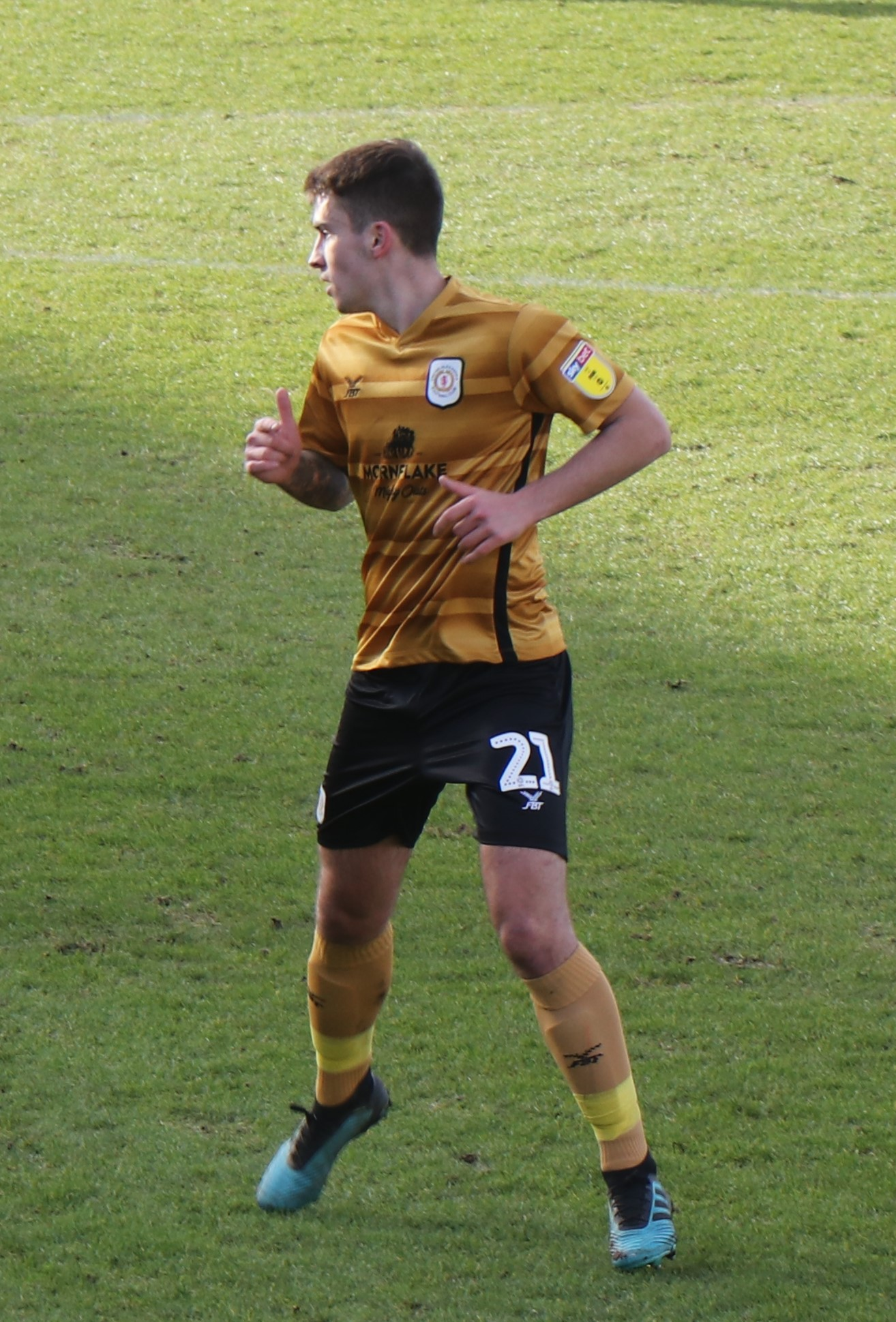
Offord playing for Crewe at Morecambe, 29 February 2020

In December 2019, Offord went on a month's loan to Nantwich Town. Soon after his return to Crewe, he made his first team debut, and first Crewe start, playing at centre-half in a 2–0 win over Leyton Orient on 28 January 2020, and then helping the team to win four of their next six games.

He scored his first league goal for Crewe on 10 October 2020, opening the scoring in a 3-0 win against Wigan Athletic at Gresty Road. On 13 November 2020, he signed a new three-year contract with Crewe through to the summer of 2023. After featuring regularly in Crewe's defence, he suffered a serious (grade 3) hamstring injury in a match against Bristol Rovers on 19 January 2021, requiring a prolonged recovery. He returned to first team action in April 2021, but then suffered another hamstring injury requiring a further prolonged lay-off.

In February 2022, Crewe's then manager David Artell said Offord could be a future captain of the club after consistent performances in the Crewe backline, and in July 2022, Artell's successor Alex Morris appointed Offord as captain for the 2022–23 season. At the end of the season, Crewe triggered an extension of his contract.

On 9 August 2023, Offord scored Crewe's goal in a 1–1 draw in their EFL League Cup first round tie against Championship side Sunderland at the Stadium of Light; Crewe won the tie 5–3 on penalties. However, Offord's season was cut short after he suffered an ankle ligament injury against Harrogate Town at Gresty Road on 17 February 2024. With surgery scheduled for 1 March 2024, Offord was ruled out for the rest of the season and Mickey Demetriou replaced him as club captain for the season's final games.

=== Milton Keynes Dons ===
In May 2024, Offord was offered a new contract by Crewe, but opted to join Milton Keynes Dons upon the expiry of his current contract. He made his debut for the club on 10 August 2024 in a 1–2 home defeat to Bradford City. He scored his first Dons goals, a brace, in the side's 6–3 league defeat at Newport County on 21 December 2024.

Offord went on to become a key part of the club's promotion-winning 2025–26 season, featuring 41 times. Despite this, he was later named as one of nine players released by the club at the conclusion of his contract on 30 June 2026.

=== Crewe Alexandra (second spell) ===
On 30 June 2026, Offord rejoined Crewe Alexandra on a two-year contract. He scored the first goal of his new spell on 5 September 2026 in a 1–1 draw against York City at Gresty Road.

== Career statistics ==
As of 15 November 2026

Appearances and goals by club, season and competition
Club	Season	Division	League		FA Cup		League Cup		Other		Total	
Club	Season	Division	Apps	Goals	Apps	Goals	Apps	Goals	Apps	Goals	Apps	Goals
Witton Albion (loan)	2018–19	NPL Premier Division	8	0	—		—		—		8	0
Nantwich Town (loan)	2019–20	NPL Premier Division	7	0	—		—		—		7	0
Crewe Alexandra	2019–20	League Two	9	0	0	0	0	0	0	0	9	0
Crewe Alexandra	2020–21	League One	28	1	2	0	0	0	0	0	30	1
Crewe Alexandra	2021–22	League One	44	0	1	0	1	0	2 (Note: Appearances in EFL Trophy)	0	48	0
Crewe Alexandra	2022–23	League Two	40	0	2	0	1	0	2	0	45	0
Crewe Alexandra	2023–24	League Two	31	1	3	0	2	1	2	0	38	2
Crewe Alexandra	Total		152	2	8	0	4	1	6	0	170	3
Milton Keynes Dons	2024–25	League Two	42	3	1	0	0	0	1	0	44	3
Milton Keynes Dons	2025–26	League Two	41	3	3	0	1	0	0	0	45	3
Milton Keynes Dons	Total		83	6	4	0	1	0	1	0	89	6
Crewe Alexandra	2026–27	League Two	15	1	1	0	2	0	2	0	20	1
Career total			265	9	13	0	7	1	9	0	294	10

== Honours ==
Milton Keynes Dons

- EFL League Two runner-up: 2025–26
