= Liam Kelly (footballer, born 1995) =

Footballer (born 1995)

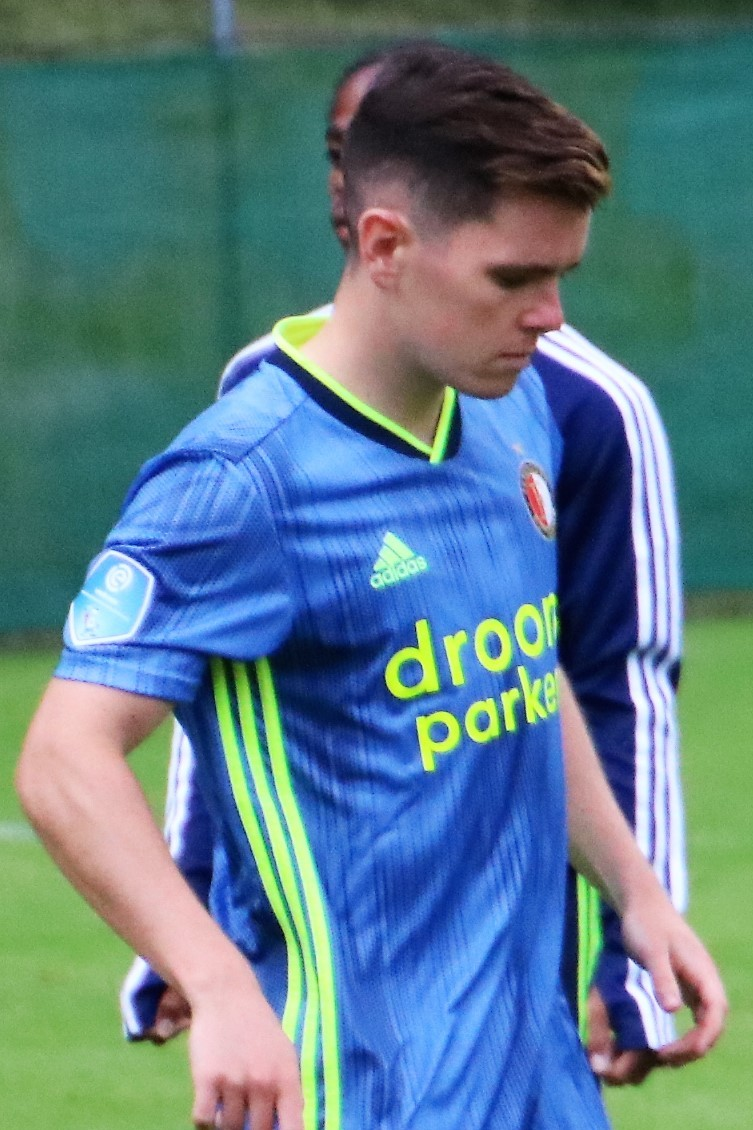
- Kelly in 2019

Personal information
- Full name: Liam Anthony Kelly
- Date of birth: 18 June 1995 (age 31)
- Place of birth: Basingstoke, England
- Height: 5 ft 4 in (1.63 m) (Note: Exact height varies by source. Soccerway gives 5 feet 4 inches (1.63 m) whilst The Irish Times gave 5 feet 7 inches (1.70 m) in 2017.)
- Position: Midfielder

Team information
- Current team: Peterborough United
- Number: 4

Youth career
- 2004–2013: Reading

Senior career*
Years	Team	Apps	(Gls)
2013–2019	Reading	82	(7)
2016	→ Bath City (loan)	16	(6)
2019–2021	Feyenoord	1	(0)
2020–2021	→ Oxford United (loan)	29	(0)
2021–2023	Rochdale	63	(6)
2023–2024	Crawley Town	37	(4)
2024–2026	Milton Keynes Dons	82	(2)
2026–	Peterborough United	9	(0)

International career
2013–2014	Republic of Ireland U19	4	(1)
2014	Republic of Ireland U21	1	(0)
- * Club domestic league appearances and goals as of 17:17, 10 October 2026 (UTC)

Liam Anthony Kelly (born 22 November 1995) is a professional footballer who plays as a midfielder for EFL League One club Peterborough United. Born in England, he has represented the Republic of Ireland internationally at under-19 and under-21 levels.

Kelly started his career at Reading, and after a loan spell at Bath City, he made his first team debut for the club in August 2016 under manager Jaap Stam. Kelly made 94 appearances across three seasons for the club, including being part of the Reading team who lost the 2017 EFL Championship play-off final. He was reunited with manager Stam in July 2019 who signed him at Dutch club Feyenoord for an undisclosed fee, though he made only two appearances for them before joining EFL League One club Oxford United on loan in January 2020, where he would remain for a year and a half. He joined EFL League Two club Rochdale on a free transfer in August 2021, and spent two seasons at the club before leaving in summer 2023, following the club's relegation to the National League. He spent the 2023–24 season at League Two club Crawley Town and secured promotion to League One with Crawley after a 2–0 victory in the 2024 EFL League Two play-off final, in which Kelly scored. He joined current club Milton Keynes Dons in July 2024.

== Club career ==
=== Reading ===
Kelly was born and raised in Basingstoke, and joined the Reading academy aged eight. In November 2013, Kelly signed his first professional contract with Reading, having previously attracted attention on YouTube for scoring impressive goals. He was part of the Reading team that won the 2013–14 Under-21 Premier League Cup, having started for Reading in the second leg of the final.

On 12 February 2016, Kelly joined Bath City on an initial one-month loan, and made his debut for the club the following day by starting in a 1–1 National League South draw with Sutton United. He scored the first goal of his loan spell on 5 March, with a "curled" shot into the top corner to equalise in a 1–1 draw away to Oxford City. His loan at Bath was twice extended, initially for another month on 11 March, before it was extended until the end of the season on 10 April 2016. Kelly scored 6 times in 16 league matches for Bath, including a brace of penalties in a 3–0 win over Hayes & Yeading United in the penultimate match of the season to ensure that Bath avoided relegation, with Bath ultimately finishing 14th.

In May 2016, Kelly signed a two-year contract with Reading. Following the appointment of Jaap Stam as Reading manager in June 2016, who favoured a possession-based style of play, Kelly began to establish himself as a regular first-team player. He made his debut for Reading on 23 August 2016 at home to Milton Keynes Dons in the EFL Cup, though was substituted off for George Evans in the 53rd minute after suffering a head injury. He made his full league debut on 22 October 2016 away to Rotherham United, though he was substituted off for tactical reasons after 29 minutes. Kelly did keep his place in the Reading starting line-up for the following match, a 2–0 EFL Cup defeat to Arsenal, but did not return to the starting line-up for a league match until 13 December, where he played in a 2–0 defeat to Leeds United. After starts in Reading's following two matches, and also a start in an abandoned match against Fulham, Kelly signed a new contract with Reading on 30 December 2016, valid until the summer of 2019. He scored his first goal for Reading in a 3–2 win against Bristol City on 2 January 2017; after coming on as a substitute with Reading 2–0 down, Kelly scored a low shot in the 72nd minute before also providing an assist for Reading's equaliser 14 minutes later. He was awarded Reading's Player of the Month award for January, with manager Stam having claimed Kelly's impact on the team was "like a new signing". He made 28 appearances in total across the regular Championship season as Reading finished 3rd and qualified for the play-offs. Though he missed the first leg of Reading's play-off semi-final against Fulham through illness, he came on as a half-time substitute in the second leg as Reading won 2–1 to progress to the final against Huddersfield Town. Kelly was introduced as an extra-time substitute in the 2017 EFL Championship play-off final after the match finished goalless in regular time. After extra time also finished 0–0, Reading lost 4–3 in a penalty shoot-out despite Kelly scoring his penalty.

Kelly extended his Reading contract on 6 July 2017, signing a new three-year deal. Kelly scored his second and third goals for the club in a 2–0 EFL Cup win over Gillingham on 8 August 2017, and scored again in a 1–1 draw with Fulham on 12 August. He won the club's Player of the Month award for August 2017. Kelly was in and out of the Reading first team over the 2017–18 season, with manager Stam suggesting of Kelly in February 2018 that his levels of performance had declined from the previous season as opposition teams "got to know what he can do". On 24 February 2018, Kelly scored from roughly 30 yards to equalise at 1–1 in an eventual 3–3 draw with Derby County – this goal won the club's Goal of the Month award for February 2018 with 91% of fan votes. Manager Stam was sacked on 21 March 2018, with Reading 20th in the Championship, and replaced by Paul Clement two days later. Reading finished the 2017–18 season 20th, having avoided relegation in the final match of the season. Kelly was voted third by the club's fans for the Player of the Season award for the 2017–18 season, behind Liam Moore and Modou Barrow, though Courtney Friday of the Reading Chronicle rated Kelly's season as 6/10, describing it as a "solid second season" for Kelly, but that the season as a whole was "one which every Reading FC fan, player and worker will want to forget".

Kelly played in 18 of Reading's first 19 league matches of the 2018–19 season, and scored once in a 3–2 win over Bristol City with a "superb strike" from 45 yards. However, manager Paul Clement was sacked on 6 December, and Kelly played just once for Reading between the appointment of José Gomes as manager on 22 December 2018, and the end of the January transfer window, despite an "impressive performance" in his sole game, a 2–0 FA Cup defeat to Manchester United. Despite Kelly being out of favour under Gomes, and speculated loan interest in him during the January transfer window from Udinese, and PEC Zwolle, the latter of which were managed by Stam, Kelly remained at the club for the second half of the season "to earn a place back in Gomes' first-team plans". Kelly was given a start at home to Blackburn on 13 February, where he "grew into the game after a poor first half" and Reading secured an eventual 2–1 win. Kelly kept his place in the starting line-up away to Sheffield United on 16 February, though was substituted off after 19 minutes with Reading 2–0 down after suffering an ankle injury, with Kelly having been "arguably at fault for [Sheffield United's] first two goals"; Reading eventually lost 4–0. Following his return from this ankle injury, Kelly did not regain his place in the team, with Gomes admitting that "the reason is, remember the last time that he played". Kelly did not play for the club again.

=== Feyenoord and Oxford United ===
On 8 July 2019, Kelly signed for Feyenoord on a three-year contract for an undisclosed fee. Kelly said that the decision to sign for Feyennord was "pretty easy" as he was reunited with former Reading manager Jaap Stam. Kelly played twice for Feyenoord in August 2019 – once as a substitute in the Europa League against Dinamo Tbilisi and once in the Eredivisie, playing for 90 minutes against FC Utrecht. Stam resigned as manager in October 2019, and his successor Dick Advocaat conducted training sessions in Dutch and "showed little interest in picking Kelly". By January 2020, Kelly had played just 110 minutes across two matches for Feyenoord, and Oxford United signed Kelly on a loan deal until the end of the 2019–20 season on 8 January 2020. He made his debut for the club as a substitute against Blackpool on 1 February, and scored his first goal for the club in his second match with a free-kick in a 3–2 defeat to Newcastle United, having also come on as a substitute. He made his first start for Oxford on 11 February against Burton Albion, but was substituted after 20 minutes due to a hamstring injury. Kelly did not play again before the postponement of the League One season in March due to the COVID-19 pandemic, and its curtailment in June, though as Oxford qualified for the League One play-offs, it was announced on 27 June 2020 that Kelly's loan was extended until 1 August to allow him to participate in them. He played once for Oxford in the play-offs, coming on as a half-time substitute in the play-off final as Oxford were beaten 2–1 by Wycombe Wanderers.

On 21 August 2020, Kelly's loan at Oxford United was extended for another season. This loan spell allowed him to return to playing regular first-team football, with Kelly telling the Oxford Mail in January 2021 that "I had a difficult time last year in terms of not playing, so my main goal this year was to get in the team and play as much as I can." He played 34 times without scoring across the 2020–21 season, though he was uninvolved in the late stages of the season, with Kelly having made his final appearance for the club on 2 April. Oxford qualified for the League One play-offs again, though Kelly was uninvolved as Oxford lost in the semi-final to Blackpool.

In August 2021, it was reported that Kelly's contract with Feyenoord had already been terminated, though this was not formally announced by the club.

=== Rochdale ===
Kelly had a trial spell with Swindon Town in August 2021, though he instead signed a two-year contract with EFL League Two club Rochdale on 24 August 2021. He made his debut for Rochdale on 31 August 2021, in a 4–0 EFL Trophy win over Liverpool U21. His performance was singled out for praise by the Rochdale Observer, who said he "marshalled the midfield", and Kelly also scored Rochdale's opening goal with a "blistering drive". He was given a league debut for the club on 25 September 2021 as a substitute in a 1–0 home defeat to Oldham Athletic, and was given his first league start on 9 October in a 1–0 home defeat to Crawley Town. He scored his first league goal for the club with a low shot after a partially cleared corner kick, to put Rochdale 2–1 up in an eventual 2–2 draw with Swindon Town on 16 October. He scored again later in October for Rochdale, in a 3–2 win over Sutton United, and also provided three assists in October, resulting in Kelly being awarded the club's Player of the Month award for October 2021. He was later also given the club's Player of the Month award for November 2021. He remained a regular starter for the club over the 2021–22 season before picking up an injury in April 2022, scoring 5 times in 30 League Two matches.

Kelly kept a regular place in the Rochdale side at the start of the 2022–23 season, playing 18 times before picking up a knock in a 1–0 FA Cup defeat to Bristol Rovers on 5 November 2022. He had scored twice in this run of matches, in consecutive matches, with the opening goal of a 2–1 win over Barrow on 15 October, before scoring a "fine finish" to equalise in 94th minute of an EFL Trophy match against Salford City and take the match to a penalty shoot-out. He returned from injury for Rochdale's final match of 2022, a 4–3 defeat away at Doncaster Rovers, before starting the following match, a 0–0 draw away at Barrow on 2 January 2023. Upon Kelly's return from injury, the club were second-bottom from League Two with 15 points from 21 matches, and Rochdale were relegated from League Two to the National League at the end of the 2022–23 season, after finishing bottom on 38 points from 46 matches. Kelly had scored twice in 39 matches in all competitions.

=== Crawley Town ===
On 22 June 2023, Crawley Town announced the signing of Kelly on a two-year contract, with Kelly having turned down Rochdale's offer of a new contract. He was given his debut for Crawley on 5 August 2023 in a 1–0 win over Bradford City, and scored his first goal for Crawley in a 3–2 win over Grimsby Town on 28 September 2023, which was described as a "stunner into the top corner from 25 yards". Kelly had also recorded the joint-most assists in the league by the end of September, and he was nominated for the EFL League Two Player of the Month award for September 2023, though it was instead awarded to Louie Barry of Stockport County. Across the 2023–24 season, Kelly scored four goals in 37 league matches as Crawley finished 7th in League Two and qualified for the League Two play-offs, securing this after a 2–0 home win over Grimsby Town in the final match of the season. The club beat MK Dons 8–1 over two legs in the semi-final, which was the biggest win in EFL play-offs history; Kelly scored the opener and also provided an assist in the 3–0 first leg win at home on 7 May, and also provided an assist in the 5–1 away win in the second leg on 11 May. On 19 May 2024, Crawley won 2–0 in the 2024 League Two play-off final against Crewe Alexandra at Wembley Stadium and gained promotion to League One; Kelly provided the assist for Danilo Orsi's first-half opener, and scored the second into an open net in the 85th minute. Kelly was given the man of the match award for all three play-off matches. Mark Dunford of Sussex Express claimed that Kelly was arguably Crawley's standout player over the 2023–24 season, highlighting his performances in the play-off matches in particular.

=== Milton Keynes Dons ===
On 4 July 2024, Kelly joined League Two club Milton Keynes Dons for an undisclosed fee. He made his debut for the club on 10 August 2024 in a 1–2 home defeat to Bradford City, but was injured shortly after and did not return to first team action until September. In late September, manager Mike Williamson was sacked following a poor start to the season, and was replaced by Crawley manager Scott Lindsey who had managed Kelly during the previous season. Kelly scored his first goal for the club on 19 October 2024, a long-range effort in a 3–1 away win over Morecambe. This was his only goal in 38 matches in all competitions across the 2024–25 season. Kelly claimed in summer 2025 that he struggled under the weight of expectation in his debut season at MK Dons, as the club finished 19th in League Two, the worst season in the club's history.

Following a standout second season in which he achieved a second-placed promotion with the club, Kelly was named in the EFL League Two Team of the Season for the 2025–26 campaign, alongside teammates Callum Paterson and Jack Sanders. He was later named the Milton Keynes Dons' Player of the Year and Players' Player of the Year at the club's annual end of season awards on 25 April 2026.

=== Peterborough United ===
On 13 August 2026, Kelly signed for Peterborough United on a long-term contract for an undisclosed fee.

== International career ==
Though born in England, Kelly is also eligible to represent the Republic of Ireland in international football due to his Irish-born grandparents. Kelly made his Republic of Ireland under-19 debut against Slovenia under-19 in September 2013, and made 4 appearances in total for the under-19 team. His only goal for the under-19 team came against Sweden under-19 in October 2013, where Kelly scored from the halfway line. Kelly made his debut and only appearance for the Republic of Ireland under-21 team against United States under-20 in November 2014.

Kelly received his first call-up for the Republic of Ireland senior team on 13 March 2017, being named in a 39-man provisional squad for matches against Wales and Iceland. However, he rejected a call-up to the Republic of Ireland senior squad in March 2018; Ireland manager Martin O'Neill suggested to the media that Kelly turned down the call-up to "keep his options open" in hope of a future England call-up, though Kelly claimed that his decision was due to "personal reasons". Kelly later claimed that he never spoke to O'Neill about playing for England, saying "I was in and out of the team at Reading at the time, so it was very far fetched to say I was looking to get an England call-up".

== Style of play ==
Kelly is a midfielder, and is capable of operating both as a defensive midfielder and an attacking midfielder. He has been described as a "playmaker", with George Elek of the Not The Top 20 Podcast highlighting his on-field intelligence and technical ability as key facets of his game in 2023. Daniel McDonnell of the Irish Independent wrote in 2017 that Kelly is "comfortable in a deep role, eager to take the ball from his defenders and dictate play", whilst Scott Lindsey, who managed Kelly at Crawley Town and Milton Keynes Dons, claimed Kelly is "very brave" in his style of play, elaborating that "he takes the ball in tight and dangerous areas, dictates and steps forward and tries things".

Kelly has been noted for his relatively short height, though Kelly told The Irish Independent in 2017 that he "never let his height worry him", adding that "guys like Andres Iniesta, Lionel Messi, Xavi are all small in stature and haven't done too bad in their careers". Reading manager Jaap Stam echoed this comparison to Iniesta in March 2017, claiming that "he can pass, move, go past people and defensively he's aggressive" and that "if you look at the things Liam can do he certainly comes close to [Iniesta]". Kelly later said that he "took [the comparison to Iniesta] as a really nice compliment".

== Career statistics ==
As of 8 August 2026

Appearances and goals by club, season and competition
Club	Season	League			National Cup		League Cup		Other		Total	
Club	Season	Division	Apps	Goals	Apps	Goals	Apps	Goals	Apps	Goals	Apps	Goals
Reading	2015–16	Championship	0	0	0	0	0	0	—		0	0
Reading	2016–17	Championship	28	1	1	0	3	0	2 (Note: Appearance(s) in 2016–17 Football League Championship play-offs)	0	34	1
Reading	2017–18	Championship	34	5	2	0	2	2	—		38	7
Reading	2018–19	Championship	20	1	1	0	1	0	—		22	1
Reading	Total		82	7	4	0	6	2	2	0	94	9
Bath City (loan)	2015–16	National League South	16	6	0	0	—		—		16	6
Feyenoord	2019–20	Eredivisie	1	0	0	0	—		1 (Note: Appearance in UEFA Europa League)	0	2	0
Feyenoord	2020–21	Eredivisie	0	0	0	0	—		0	0	0	0
Feyenoord	2021–22	Eredivisie	0	0	0	0	—		0	0	0	0
Feyenoord	Total		1	0	0	0	—		1	0	2	0
Oxford United (loan)	2019–20	League One	3	0	1	1	0	0	1 (Note: Appearance(s) in 2019–20 Football League One play-offs)	0	5	1
Oxford United (loan)	2020–21	League One	26	0	1	0	2	0	5 (Note: Appearance(s) in EFL Trophy)	0	34	0
Oxford United (loan)	Total		29	0	2	1	2	0	6	0	39	1
Rochdale	2021–22	League Two	30	5	3	0	1	0	2	1	36	6
Rochdale	2022–23	League Two	33	1	1	0	1	0	3	0	38	1
Rochdale	Total		63	6	4	0	2	0	5	0	74	6
Crawley Town	2023–24	League Two	37	4	1	0	1	0	6 (Note: Three appearances and two goals in 2023–24 EFL League Two play-offs, three appearances in EFL Trophy)	2	45	6
Milton Keynes Dons	2024–25	League Two	37	1	0	0	0	0	1	0	38	1
Milton Keynes Dons	2025–26	League Two	45	1	3	1	1	0	0	0	49	2
Milton Keynes Dons	2026–27	League One	—		—		1	0	—		1	0
Milton Keynes Dons	Total		82	2	3	1	2	0	1	0	88	3
Peterborough United	2026–27	League One	0	0	0	0	0	0	0	0	0	0
Career total			310	21	14	2	13	2	21	3	358	32

== Honours ==
Crawley Town

- EFL League Two play-offs: 2024

Milton Keynes Dons

- EFL League Two runner-up: 2025–26

Individual

- EFL League Two Team of the Season: 2025–26
- Milton Keynes Dons Players' Player of the Year: 2025–26
- Milton Keynes Dons Player of the Year: 2025–26
