= Jonathan Svedberg =

Swedish association football player

Personal information
- Full name: Jonathan Svedberg
- Date of birth: 22 March 1999 (age 27)
- Place of birth: Sweden
- Position: Midfielder

Team information
- Current team: IFK Mariehamn
- Number: 11

Youth career
- –2011: BK Astrio
- 2012–2015: Halmstads BK

Senior career*
Years	Team	Apps	(Gls)
2016–2024	Halmstads BK	166	(6)
2025–2026	St Johnstone	16	(0)
2026–	IFK Mariehamn	10	(1)

International career
2016–2018	Sweden U19	11	(0)
- * Club domestic league appearances and goals as of 13 November 2026

Jonathan Svedberg (born 22 March 1999) is a Swedish professional footballer who plays as a midfielder for IFK Mariehamn.

== Career ==
On 24 January 2025, Svedberg signed for Scottish Premiership club St Johnstone on an eighteen-month contract.

== Honours ==
St Johnstone

- Scottish Championship: 2025–26
