= Callan Hamill =

Scottish association football player

Personal information
- Date of birth: 1 March 2009 (age 17)
- Position: Defender

Team information
- Current team: Arsenal
- Number: 73

Youth career
- –2025: St Johnstone
- 2025–: Arsenal

Senior career*
| Years | Team | Apps | (Gls) |
| 2025 | St Johnstone | 1 | (0) |

International career^{‡}
| 2024–2026 | Scotland U17 | 10 | (0) |
| 2025– | Scotland U19 | 5 | (0) |
- * Club domestic league appearances and goals as of 22:16, 20 May 2025 (UTC) ‡ National team caps and goals as of 07:59, 20 October 2026 (UTC)

Callan Hamill (born 1 March 2009) is a Scottish professional footballer who plays as a defender for the academy of Premier League club Arsenal.

== Club career ==
He joined the youth academy at St Johnstone at a young age. A right-footed defender, at the age of 15 Hamill reportedly had interest in his services from Scottish clubs Celtic and Rangers, as well as English club Arsenal. He signed a youth player contract with St Johnstone in the summer of 2024, with part of the agreement allowing him to stay in Scotland was that he would split his time between St Johnstone and the Arsenal academy. Playing with the Arsenal under-17 squad, he won the Flamengo Adidas Cup in Brazil, beating the hosts 3–1 in the final in December 2024.

He made his professional debut in the Scottish Premiership on 18 May 2025, appearing as a second-half substitute for Elliot Watt in a 2–0 home defeat against Dundee. Although predominantly a centre-half or full-back, he played in the game as a central midfielder. It was reported to likely be his first and last appearance for the club, with a permanent move to Arsenal finalised in the months beforehand. The initial deal was reported to be for a six-figure transfer fee, with several add-on clauses included in the package.

On 16 July 2025, he signed for the academy of Arsenal for an undisclosed fee.

== International career ==
He is a Scotland youth international. He scored for Scotland’s under-16s team in February 2025 in a 3–1 win over Cyprus U18. He then went on to feature for the Scotland national under-17 football team.
