= Oludare Olufunwa =

English association football player

Personal information
- Full name: Oludare Samuel Araba Olufunwa
- Date of birth: 29 July 2001 (age 25)
- Height: 1.86 m (6 ft 1 in)
- Position: Defender

Team information
- Current team: Torquay United
- Number: 21

Youth career
- –2022: Southampton
- 2022–2023: Liverpool

Senior career*
| Years | Team | Apps | (Gls) |
| 2023–2025 | St Johnstone | 11 | (0) |
| 2024 | → Hamilton Academical (loan) | 3 | (0) |
| 2025 | Gnistan | 11 | (0) |
| 2026 | Al-Salt | 14 | (0) |
| 2026– | Torquay United | 0 | (0) |
- * Club domestic league appearances and goals as of 7 May 2026

Oludare Samuel Araba Olufunwa (born 29 July 2001) is an English professional footballer who plays as a defender for National League South club Torquay United.

== Career ==
Olufunwa was in the academy of Southampton and signed a two-year professional contract in 2020. He was at the club for eleven years in total prior to his release in 2022. He spent the 2022–23 season with Liverpool and made 30 appearances in Premier League 2. In August 2023 he signed a contract with Scottish club St Johnstone, agreeing to a two-year contract. He made his Scottish Premiership debut on 5 August 2023 against Heart of Midlothian. In September 2024, he joined Scottish Championship side Hamilton Academical on loan until January 2025.

On 1 April 2025, Finnish Veikkausliiga club IF Gnistan announced the signing of Olufunwa for the 2025 season.

In January 2026, Olufunwa joined Slovak First Football League side Trenčín on trial.

On 31 January 2026, Olufunwa joined Jordanian Pro League club Al-Salt.

On 5 September 2026, Olufunwa returned to England, joining National League South club Torquay United.

== Style of play ==
It has been reported that Olufunwa is capable of playing at centre-back or right-back.

== Personal life ==
Born in England, raised in Elephant and Castle, South East London, Olufunwa attended The Wellington Academy Boarding School located in Tidworth, Wiltshire. He has Nigerian heritage from his father and English inheritance from his mother.

== Career statistics ==
As of 31 January 2026

Appearances and goals by club, season and competition
| Club | Season | League | | | National cup | | League cup | | Other | | Total | |
| Club | Season | Division | Apps | Goals | Apps | Goals | Apps | Goals | Apps | Goals | Apps | Goals |
|---|---|---|---|---|---|---|---|---|---|---|---|---|
| Southampton U21 | 2021–22 | – | | | | | | | 2 (Note: Includes EFL Trophy) | 0 | 2 | 0 |
| Liverpool U21 | 2022–23 | – | | | | | | | 2 | 0 | 2 | 0 |
| St Johnstone | 2023–24 | Scottish Premiership | 11 | 0 | 0 | 0 | 0 | 0 | 0 | 0 | 11 | 0 |
| St Johnstone | 2024–25 | Scottish Premiership | 0 | 0 | 0 | 0 | 0 | 0 | 0 | 0 | 0 | 0 |
| St Johnstone | Total | | 11 | 0 | 0 | 0 | 0 | 0 | 0 | 0 | 11 | 0 |
| Hamilton Academical (loan) | 2024–25 | Scottish Championship | 3 | 0 | 0 | 0 | 0 | 0 | 1 (Note: Includes Scottish Challenge Cup) | 0 | 4 | 0 |
| Gnistan | 2025 | Veikkausliiga | 11 | 0 | 3 (Note: Includes Suomen Cup) | 2 | 0 | 0 | – | | 11 | 0 |
| Al-Salt | 2025–26 | Jordanian Pro League | 0 | 0 | – | | – | | – | | 0 | 0 |
| Career total | | | 25 | 0 | 3 | 2 | 0 | 0 | 5 | 0 | 33 | 2 |
