= 2025–26 Queen of the South F.C. season =

Queen of the South
2025–26 season
- Chairman: Billy Hewitson
- Manager: Peter Murphy
- Stadium: Palmerston Park
- Scottish League One: 3rd
- Scottish Cup: Third round
- League Cup: Group stages
- Challenge Cup: Third round
- Top goalscorer: League: Reece Lyon (9); All: Reece Lyon (13)
- Highest home attendance: 1,938 vs. Inverness Caledonian Thistle, 31 January 2026
- Lowest home attendance: 601 vs. Alloa Athletic, 4 October 2025
- Average home league attendance: 1,064
Home colours	Away colours

The 2025–26 season is Queen of the South's fourth consecutive season back in the third tier of Scottish football, in Scottish League One. Queens are also competing in the Challenge Cup, League Cup and the Scottish Cup.

== Summary ==
Queens finished third in Scottish League One for the second successive season, in their fourth season back in Scottish Football's third tier and their league position qualified the club for the semi-final stage of the play-offs, where they played Stenhousemuir. The semi-final ended 2-2 on aggregate after the second leg and 3-3 on aggregate after extra-time, with the Warriors progressing to the play-off final, after winning the penalty shoot-out 4-3.

Queens reached the third round of the Challenge Cup, losing 1-0 to Raith Rovers at Stark's Park.

The Doonhamers were knocked out after the first round of the League Cup after the completion of fixtures in Group B that included Edinburgh City, Partick Thistle, Ross County and Stranraer.

Queens reached the third round of the Scottish Cup, losing 2-1 to Dunfermline Athletic at East End Park.

== Results and fixtures ==
Win Draw Loss Abandoned or Postponed

=== Pre season ===
22 June 2025 Friendly	Glenafton Athletic	1-3	Queen of the South	New Cumnock
19:30	Moffat 8'		McLinden 14'; Lyon 19'; Luissint 33' (pen.)	Stadium: Loch Park

28 June 2025 Friendly	Queen of the South	2-0	Workington	Dumfries
14:00	Johnstone 61'; Hunter 80'			Stadium: Palmerston Park

1 July 2025 Friendly	Queen of the South	2-0	Greenock Morton	Dumfries
19:30	Z. McKay 52'; Kennedy 64'		Davies (penalty missed) 68'	Stadium: Palmerston Park

4 July 2025 Friendly	Dumbarton	3-3	Queen of the South	Dumbarton
14:00	Wallace 48' (pen.); Blair 60'; Roy 64'		Darboe 50', 51'; Lyon 90'	Stadium: Marbill Coaches Stadium

=== Scottish League One ===
2 August 2025 Match 1	Cove Rangers	0-2	Queen of the South	Aberdeen
15:00		QOSFC Report; SPFL Report	Guthrie 19'; Kennedy 81'	Stadium: Balmoral Stadium; Attendance: 402; Referee: Kennedy; Man of the Match: Luissint

9 August 2025 Match 2	Queen of the South	1-4	Hamilton Academical	Dumfries
15:00	Lyon 46'	QOSFC Report; SPFL Report	C. Smith 28', 53'; A. Trialist 39'; Bradley 61'	Stadium: Palmerston Park; Attendance: 1,246; Referee: Soutar; Man of the Match: Stewart

16 August 2025 Match 3	Queen of the South	4-0	Peterhead	Dumfries
15:00	Guthrie 34'; Luissint 47'; Kennedy 51'; Charters 72'	QOSFC Report; SPFL Report	Shanks (penalty missed) 76'	Stadium: Palmerston Park; Attendance: 949; Referee: Murdoch; Man of the Match: Kennedy

23 August 2025 Match 4	Stenhousemuir	0-0	Queen of the South	Larbert
15:00		QOSFC Report; SPFL Report		Stadium: Ochilview Park; Attendance: 536; Referee: McFarlane; Man of the Match: Stott

30 August 2025 Match 5	Queen of the South	2-1	Kelty Hearts	Dumfries
15:00	Guthrie 21'; Lyon 88'	QOSFC Report; SPFL Report	Arnott 53'	Stadium: Palmerston Park; Attendance: 1,124; Referee: Hanvidge; Man of the Match: Kennedy

13 September 2025 Match 6	East Fife	2-1	Queen of the South	Methil
15:00	Goss 25'; Austin 46'	QOSFC Report; SPFL Report	Lyon 45+2'	Stadium: Bayview Stadium; Attendance: 773; Referee: Hay; Man of the Match: Lyon

20 September 2025 Match 7	Queen of the South	0-2	Inverness Caledonian Thistle	Dumfries
15:00		QOSFC Report; SPFL Report	Zimba 9'; Longstaff 90+4'	Stadium: Palmerston Park; Attendance: 1,114; Referee: Graham; Man of the Match: Stewart

27 September 2025 Match 8	Montrose	2-1	Queen of the South	Montrose
15:00	Webster 61'; Freeman 73'	QOSFC Report; SPFL Report	Dickenson 81'	Stadium: Links Park; Attendance: 546; Referee: Hanvidge; Man of the Match: Dickenson

4 October 2025 Match 9	Queen of the South	1-0	Alloa Athletic	Dumfries
17:30	Hewitt 90+3'	QOSFC Report; SPFL Report		Stadium: Palmerston Park; Attendance: 601; Referee: Snedden; Man of the Match: Hewitt

18 October 2025 Match 10	Peterhead	3-0	Queen of the South	Peterhead
17:30	Shanks 3' (pen.); McGuffie 39'; Jsn. Brown 74'	QOSFC Report; SPFL Report		Stadium: Balmoor Stadium; Attendance: 927; Referee: Hogarth; Man of the Match: Dickenson

24 October 2025 Match 11	Hamilton Academical	1-2	Queen of the South	Westfield
19:45	C. Smith 71'	QOSFC Report; SPFL Report	Stott 18'; Loughrey 67' (o.g.)	Stadium: Broadwood Stadium; Attendance: 666; Referee: Steven; Man of the Match: Kennedy

1 November 2025 Match 12	Queen of the South	1-1	Stenhousemuir	Dumfries
15:00	Stott 19'	QOSFC Report; SPFL Report	Taylor 90+3'	Stadium: Palmerston Park; Attendance: 920; Referee: Anderson; Man of the Match: O'Donoghue

8 November 2025 Match 13	Queen of the South	3-0	East Fife	Dumfries
15:00	L. Smith 6'; Stott 8'; Guthrie 58'	QOSFC Report; SPFL Report		Stadium: Palmerston Park; Attendance: 900; Referee: Wilson; Man of the Match: Hannah

15 November 2025 Match 14	Kelty Hearts	1-1	Queen of the South	Kelty
15:00	Diack 54'	QOSFC Report; SPFL Report	Kennedy 49' (pen.)	Stadium: New Central Park; Attendance: 434; Referee: Stirling; Man of the Match: Kennedy

22 November 2025 Match 15	Inverness Caledonian Thistle	4-0	Queen of the South	Inverness
17:30	Sole 8'; Zimba 35'; Mackinnon 65'; Bavidge 75'	P&J Report; SPFL Report		Stadium: Caledonian Stadium; Attendance: 2,003; Referee: Wilkie; Man of the Match: Lyon

6 December 2025 Match 16	Queen of the South	1-1	Cove Rangers	Dumfries
15:00	Douglas 88'	QOSFC Report; SPFL Report	Emslie 43'	Stadium: Palmerston Park; Attendance: 665; Referee: Snedden; Man of the Match: Stewart

13 December 2025 Match 17	Alloa Athletic	0-2	Queen of the South	Alloa
15:00		QOSFC Report; SPFL Report	Guthrie 12'; L. Smith 76'	Stadium: Indodrill Stadium; Attendance: 600; Referee: Hogarth; Man of the Match: Kennedy

20 December 2025 Match 18	Queen of the South	1-0	Montrose	Dumfries
15:00	Hewitt 48'	QOSFC Report; SPFL Report		Stadium: Palmerston Park; Attendance: 900; Referee: Grainger; Man of the Match: Dickenson

27 December 2025 Match 19	Queen of the South	4-1	Hamilton Academical	Dumfries
15:00	Douglas 12', 45', 52'; Stott 89'	QOSFC Report; SPFL Report	C. Smith 47'	Stadium: Palmerston Park; Attendance: 1,643; Referee: Ashwood; Man of the Match: Douglas

3 January 2026 Match 20	Stenhousemuir	2-0	Queen of the South	Larbert
15:00	Aitken 35'; Jamieson 80'	QOSFC Report; SPFL Report		Stadium: Ochilview Park; Attendance: 503; Referee: Soutar; Man of the Match: Hewitt

10 January 2026 Match 21	Queen of the South	3-1	Kelty Hearts	Dumfries
15:00	Stott 60'; Lyon 72'; L. Smith 90+4'	QOSFC Report; SPFL Report	Johnston 19'	Stadium: Palmerston Park; Attendance: 997; Referee: Grieve; Man of the Match: L. Smith

24 January 2026 Match 22	East Fife	1-5	Queen of the South	Methil
15:00	Trouten (red card) 58'; Rowe 76'	QOSFC Report; SPFL Report	Stott 10'; Kennedy 45' (pen.); Douglas 54'; Dickenson 69'; Allan 90' (pen.)	Stadium: Bayview Stadium; Attendance: 689; Referee: Murdoch; Man of the Match: L. Smith

31 January 2026 Match 23	Queen of the South	2-2	Inverness Caledonian Thistle	Dumfries
15:00	Kennedy 20'; Hewitt 79'	QOSFC Report; SPFL Report	Sole 9'; Alonge 51'	Stadium: Palmerston Park; Attendance: 1,938; Referee: Wilkie; Man of the Match: Kennedy

7 February 2026 Match 24	Cove Rangers	1-1	Queen of the South	Aberdeen
15:00	Megginson 71'	QOSFC Report; SPFL Report	Kennedy 2'	Stadium: Balmoral Stadium; Attendance: 516; Referee: Stuart; Man of the Match: Kennedy

14 February 2026 Match 25	Queen of the South	1-2	Alloa Athletic	Dumfries
15:00	Lyon 51'	QOSFC Report; SPFL Report	Donnelly 27'; Roberts 84'	Stadium: Palmerston Park; Attendance: 1,099; Referee: Graham; Man of the Match: Lyon

21 February 2026 Match 26	Montrose	3-2	Queen of the South	Montrose
15:00	Steeves 2'; Sutherland 12'; C. Brown 85'	QOSFC Report; SPFL Report	Kennedy 75', 80' (pen.)	Stadium: Links Park; Attendance: 495; Referee: Williams; Man of the Match: Kennedy

28 February 2026 Match 27	Queen of the South	0-2	Peterhead	Dumfries
15:00		QOSFC Report; SPFL Report	Shanks 45+4' (pen.); Jsn. Brown 54'	Stadium: Palmerston Park; Attendance: 1,014; Referee: Snedden; Man of the Match: Lyon

7 March 2026 Match 28	Queen of the South	1-1	Stenhousemuir	Dumfries
15:00	Guthrie 59'	QOSFC Report; SPFL Report	Jamieson 24'	Stadium: Palmerston Park; Attendance: 888; Referee: Wilson; Man of the Match: Guthrie

14 March 2026 Match 29	Hamilton Academical	1-3	Queen of the South	Westfield
15:00	Shaw 22'	QOSFC Report; SPFL Report	Clark 29', 77'; Lyon 52'	Stadium: Broadwood Stadium; Attendance: 450; Referee: Calder; Man of the Match: Clark

21 March 2026 Match 30	Queen of the South	2-2	East Fife	Dumfries
15:00	Lyon 2', 24'	QOSFC Report; SPFL Report	Gaffney 6'; Culbert 59'	Stadium: Palmerston Park; Attendance: 900; Referee: Graves; Man of the Match: Lyon

27 March 2026 Match 31	Inverness Caledonian Thistle	1-1	Queen of the South	Inverness
19:45	Millen 53'	QOSFC Report; SPFL Report	Clark 35'	Stadium: Caledonian Stadium; Attendance: 2,466; Referee: Hanvidge; Man of the Match: Clark

4 April 2026 Match 32	Kelty Hearts	1-1	Queen of the South	Kelty
15:00	Fisher 83'	QOSFC Report; SPFL Report	Allan 51'; Hannah (red card) 68'	Stadium: New Central Park; Attendance: 365; Referee: Hay; Man of the Match: Luissint

11 April 2026 Match 33	Queen of the South	2-0	Cove Rangers	Dumfries
15:00	Luissint 67'; Lyon 79'	QOSFC Report; SPFL Report		Stadium: Palmerston Park; Attendance: 838; Referee: Soutar; Man of the Match: Lyon

18 April 2026 Match 34	Peterhead	1-1	Queen of the South	Peterhead
15:00	McGinn 78'	QOSFC Report; SPFL Report	Douglas 88'	Stadium: Balmoor Stadium; Attendance: 737; Referee: Grieve; Man of the Match: Douglas

25 April 2026 Match 35	Queen of the South	2-2	Montrose	Dumfries
15:00	Dickenson 65'; Luissint 76'	QOSFC Report; SPFL Report	Loudon 27'; Sutherland 58'	Stadium: Palmerston Park; Attendance: 1,413; Referee: Hendry; Man of the Match: Luissint

2 May 2026 Match 36	Alloa Athletic	1-4	Queen of the South	Alloa
15:00	Orsi 44'	QOSFC Report; SPFL Report	Dickenson 28'; Clark 72', 85'; L. Smith 87'	Stadium: Indodrill Stadium; Attendance: 893; Referee: Williams; Man of the Match: L. Smith

=== Championship play-offs ===
5 May 2026 Semi Final 1st Leg	Queen of the South	1-1	Stenhousemuir	Dumfries
19:45	Lyon 90+2'	QOSFC Report; BBC Sport Report	Buchanan 43'	Stadium: Palmerston Park; Attendance: 1,774; Referee: Wilson; Man of the Match: Kennedy

9 May 2026 Semi Final 2nd Leg	Stenhousemuir	2-2 (a.e.t.) (3-3 agg.) (4-3 p)	Queen of the South	Larbert
15:00	Aitken 4'; Whyte 103'	QOSFC Report; BBC Sport Report	Clark 22', 117'	Stadium: Ochilview Park; Attendance: 1,178; Referee: Anderson; Man of the Match: Kennedy
	Penalties
	Buchanan (penalty scored); Aitken (penalty missed); Carrick (penalty scored); Anderson (penalty scored); Whyte (penalty scored)		Guthrie (penalty scored); Kennedy (penalty scored); Allan (penalty scored); Lyon (penalty missed); Clark (penalty missed)

=== Scottish League Cup ===
15 July 2025 Round 1;Group B-1	Queen of the South	4-0	Edinburgh City	Dumfries
19:45	Guthrie 16'; Lyon 46', 51'; Hewitt 78'	SPFL Report		Stadium: Palmerston Park; Attendance: 781; Referee: Ashwood; Man of the Match: Lyon

19 July 2025 Round 1; Group B-2	Queen of the South	0-1	Ross County	Dumfries
15:00		QOSFC Report; SPFL Report	Henderson 73'	Stadium: Palmerston Park; Attendance: 1,012; Referee: Stuart; Man of the Match: Kennedy

22 July 2025 Round 1; Group B-3	Partick Thistle	2-0	Queen of the South	Glasgow
19:45	Fitzpatrick 32'; Letsosa 34'	QOSFC Report; SPFL Report		Stadium: Firhill Stadium; Attendance: 2,235; Referee: Calder; Man of the Match: L. Smith

26 July 2025 Round 1; Group B-4	Stranraer	1-0	Queen of the South	Stranraer
15:00	Quigg 59'	QOSFC Report; SPFL Report	Stewart (yellow card) 61' (yellow-red card) 88'	Stadium: Stair Park; Attendance: 815; Referee: Williams; Man of the Match: Lyon

=== Scottish Challenge Cup ===
12 August 2025 Lge Phase 1	East Kilbride	3-1	Queen of the South	East Kilbride
19:45	Dobbie 19', 57'; Leitch 80'	QOSFC Report; SPFL Report	Guthrie 8'	Stadium: K-Park Training Academy; Attendance: 500; Referee: Hogarth; Man of the Match: L. Smith

26 August 2025 Lge Phase 2	Queen of the South	3-1	Clyde	Dumfries
19:45	Guthrie 21', 72'; Charters 78'	QOSFC Report; SPFL Report	Leitch 46'	Stadium: Palmerston Park; Attendance: 496; Referee: Hay; Man of the Match: Guthrie

6 September 2025 Lge Phase 3	Queen of the South	2-1	Rangers B	Dumfries
15:00	Luissint 49'; O'Donoghue 73'	QOSFC Report; SPFL Report	Christie 65'	Stadium: Palmerston Park; Attendance: 946; Referee: Stirling; Man of the Match: Luissint

23 September 2025 Lge Phase 4	Queen of the South	2-3	Heart of Midlothian B	Dumfries
19:45	O'Donoghue 24'; Hewitt 34'	QOSFC Report; SPFL Report	North 73'; McLuckie 75'; Douglas 81' (o.g.)	Stadium: Palmerston Park; Attendance: 649; Referee: Wilkie; Man of the Match: O'Donoghue

11 October 2025 Lge Phase 5	Stranraer	1-1	Queen of the South	Stranraer
15:00	Turay 61'	QOSFC Report; SPFL Report	L. Smith 89'	Stadium: Stair Park; Attendance: 565; Referee: Stirling; Man of the Match: Rogerson

11 November 2025 Lge Phase 6	Queen of the South	3-1	Motherwell B	Dumfries
19:45	L. Smith 60'; Lyon 67'; Ross 78'	QOSFC Report; SPFL Report	Watson 49'	Stadium: Palmerston Park; Attendance: 307; Referee: Stuart; Man of the Match: Johnstone

9 December 2025	Queen of the South	P-P	Dunfermline Athletic	Dumfries
19:45		QOSFC News		Stadium: Palmerston Park
Note: Postponed due to adverse weather, travel conditions and safety concerns

16 December 2025 Round 2	Queen of the South	4-3	Dunfermline Athletic	Dumfries
19:45	Guthrie 6'; Stott 11' (penalty missed) 56'; O'Donoghue 74'; Dickenson 76'	QOSFC Report; SPFL Report	MacLeod 41'; B. Stewart 79', 83'	Stadium: Palmerston Park; Attendance: 484; Referee: Wilkie; Man of the Match: L. Smith

6 January 2026 Round 3	Raith Rovers	1-0	Queen of the South	Kirkcaldy
19:45	Easton 37' (pen.)	QOSFC Report; SPFL Report		Stadium: Stark's Park; Attendance: 854; Referee: Hay; Man of the Match: Hewitt

=== Scottish Cup ===
29 November 2025 Round 3	Dunfermline Athletic	2-1	Queen of the South	Dunfermline
15:00	Kane 7', 15'	QOSFC Report; BBC Sport Report	J.Tod 4' (o.g.)	Stadium: East End Park; Attendance: 2,127; Referee: McFarlane; Man of the Match: Rogerson

== Player statistics ==
=== Captains ===
No.	P	Name	Country	No. games	Notes
5	DF	Matty Douglas	(England)	45	Club Captain
4	MF	Reece Lyon	(Scotland)	5	Vice Captain
6	DF	Jack Hannah	(England)	1	Vice Captain

Last updated: 9 May 2026
Source: Competitive match reports.
Competitive matches only
Matches started as captain only
Country: FIFA nationality; No.: Squad number; P: Position; Name: Player name; No. Games: Number of games started as captain.

=== Squad ===
As of 9 May 2026

No.	Pos	Nat	Player	Total		Scottish League One		Challenge Cup		League Cup		Scottish Cup		Play-offs	
No.	Pos	Nat	Player	Apps	Goals	Apps	Goals	Apps	Goals	Apps	Goals	Apps	Goals	Apps	Goals
1	GK	(Scotland) SCO	Ross Stewart	44	0	32+0	0	5+0	0	4+0	0	1+0	0	2+0	0
2	DF	(Scotland) SCO	Michael Hewitt	37	5	18+6	3	7+0	1	4+0	1	0+0	0	2+0	0
3	MF	(England) ENG	Taylor Charters	43	2	27+4	1	6+1	1	3+1	0	1+0	0	0+0	0
4	MF	(Scotland) SCO	Reece Lyon	49	13	36+0	9	6+0	1	4+0	2	1+0	0	2+0	1
5	DF	(England) ENG	Matty Douglas	49	6	34+2	6	5+1	0	3+1	0	1+0	0	2+0	0
6	DF	(England) ENG	Jack Hannah	39	0	28+0	0	6+0	0	3+0	0	0+0	0	2+0	0
7	MF	(Scotland) SCO	Liam Smith	51	6	30+6	4	6+2	2	4+0	0	1+0	0	2+0	0
8	MF	(Guadeloupe) GLP	Benjamin Luissint	40	4	27+2	3	2+2	1	3+1	0	1+0	0	2+0	0
9	FW	(Scotland) SCO	Jordan Allan	10	2	3+6	2	0+0	0	0+0	0	0+0	0	0+1	0
10	MF	(Scotland) SCO	Kai Kennedy	48	8	33+2	8	3+3	0	4+0	0	1+0	0	2+0	0
11	MF	(England) ENG	Brennan Dickenson	28	5	17+6	4	0+2	1	0+0	0	1+0	0	2+0	0
12	DF	(Scotland) SCO	Callum Penman	16	0	13+1	0	0+0	0	1+0	0	0+0	0	1+0	0
14	MF	(Scotland) SCO	Ben Johnstone	33	0	10+12	0	6+1	0	3+1	0	0+0	0	0+0	0
15	DF	(Scotland) SCO	Niall Rogerson	30	0	5+13	0	7+1	0	1+1	0	1+0	0	0+1	0
16	MF	(Scotland) SCO	Zander MacKenzie	30	0	19+6	0	2+0	0	0+0	0	1+0	0	1+1	0
17	FW	(Scotland) SCO	Kian Leslie	6	0	1+2	0	3+0	0	0+0	0	0+0	0	0+0	0
18	MF	(England) ENG	Jack Stott	44	7	21+8	6	7+1	1	3+1	0	0+1	0	0+2	0
19	MF	(Zimbabwe) ZIM	Menzi Mazwi	1	0	0+1	0	0+0	0	0+0	0	0+0	0	0+0	0
20	MF	(England) ENG	Seb Mason	7	0	0+7	0	0+0	0	0+0	0	0+0	0	0+0	0
21	MF	(Scotland) SCO	Euan Ross	18	1	1+9	0	2+3	1	1+2	0	0+0	0	0+0	0
22	FW	Isle of Man	Freddie O'Donoghue	20	3	2+11	0	3+4	3	0+0	0	0+0	0	0+0	0
23	MF	(Scotland) SCO	Kylan Hunter	2	0	0+0	0	0+2	0	0+0	0	0+0	0	0+0	0
24	FW	(England) ENG	Harry McLinden	2	0	0+0	0	0+0	0	0+2	0	0+0	0	0+0	0
26	GK	(New Zealand) NZL	Lawton Green	4	0	0+1	0	3+0	0	0+0	0	0+0	0	0+0	0
27	MF	(Scotland) SCO	Billy Gray	11	0	0+5	0	1+4	0	0+0	0	0+1	0	0+0	0
28	FW	(England) ENG	Kurtis Guthrie	39	11	26+2	6	5+0	4	3+0	1	1+0	0	0+2	0
29	GK	(Scotland) SCO	Corey Armour	0	0	0+0	0	0+0	0	0+0	0	0+0	0	0+0	0
30	MF	(Scotland) SCO	Cole Burke	6	0	0+2	0	2+1	0	0+1	0	0+0	0	0+0	0
31	MF	(Scotland) SCO	Ben Morton	1	0	0+0	0	0+1	0	0+0	0	0+0	0	0+0	0
32	FW	(The Gambia) GAM	Kemo Darboe	1	0	0+1	0	0+0	0	0+0	0	0+0	0	0+0	0
34	GK	(Scotland) SCO	Jamie Sneddon	4	0	4+0	0	0+0	0	0+0	0	0+0	0	0+0	0
88	FW	(Scotland) SCO	Nicky Clark	13	7	9+2	5	0+0	0	0+0	0	0+0	0	2+0	2

=== Disciplinary record ===
As of 9 May 2026 (UTC)

Number	Nation	Position	Name	Scottish League One		Challenge Cup		League Cup		Scottish Cup		Play-offs		Total	
Number	Nation	Position	Name	Booked	Sent off (straight red)	Booked	Sent off (straight red)	Booked	Sent off (straight red)	Booked	Sent off (straight red)	Booked	Sent off (straight red)	Booked	Sent off (straight red)
1	(Scotland)	GK	Ross Stewart	4	0	1	0	2	1	0	0	0	0	7	1
2	(Scotland)	DF	Michael Hewitt	4	0	1	0	0	0	0	0	1	0	6	0
3	(England)	MF	Taylor Charters	2	0	2	0	0	0	1	0	0	0	5	0
4	(Scotland)	MF	Reece Lyon	7	0	1	0	0	0	0	0	0	0	8	0
5	(England)	DF	Matty Douglas	9	0	1	0	1	0	0	0	1	0	12	0
6	(England)	DF	Jack Hannah	4	1	1	0	0	0	0	0	0	0	5	1
7	(Scotland)	MF	Liam Smith	4	0	0	0	1	0	0	0	0	0	5	0
8	(Guadeloupe)	MF	Benjamin Luissint	5	0	0	0	1	0	1	0	1	0	8	0
10	(Scotland)	MF	Kai Kennedy	10	0	1	0	0	0	0	0	1	0	12	0
11	(England)	MF	Brennan Dickenson	5	0	0	0	0	0	1	0	0	0	6	0
12	(Scotland)	DF	Callum Penman	1	0	0	0	0	0	0	0	0	0	1	0
14	(Scotland)	MF	Ben Johnstone	4	0	2	0	1	0	0	0	0	0	7	0
15	(Scotland)	DF	Niall Rogerson	3	0	1	0	0	0	0	0	0	0	4	0
16	(Scotland)	MF	Zander MacKenzie	4	0	0	0	0	0	0	0	0	0	4	0
18	(England)	MF	Jack Stott	8	0	1	0	1	0	0	0	1	0	11	0
20	(England)	MF	Seb Mason	2	0	0	0	0	0	0	0	0	0	2	0
21	(Scotland)	MF	Euan Ross	0	0	1	0	0	0	0	0	0	0	1	0
22	(Isle of Man)	FW	Freddie O'Donoghue	1	0	1	0	0	0	0	0	0	0	2	0
26	(New Zealand)	GK	Lawton Green	1	0	0	0	0	0	0	0	0	0	1	0
27	(Scotland)	MF	Billy Gray	1	0	0	0	0	0	0	0	0	0	1	0
28	(England)	FW	Kurtis Guthrie	7	0	0	0	1	0	0	0	0	0	8	0
88	(Scotland)	FW	Nicky Clark	1	0	0	0	0	0	0	0	1	0	2	0
Total				87	1	14	0	8	1	3	0	6	0	118	2

=== Top scorers ===
Last updated 9 May 2026

Position	Nation	Name	Scottish League One	League Cup	Challenge Cup	Scottish Cup	Play-offs	Total
1	(Scotland)	Reece Lyon	9	2	1	0	1	13
2	(England)	Kurtis Guthrie	6	1	4	0	0	11
3	(Scotland)	Kai Kennedy	8	0	0	0	0	8
4	(England)	Jack Stott	6	0	1	0	0	7
=	(Scotland)	Nicky Clark	5	0	0	0	2	7
6	(England)	Matty Douglas	6	0	0	0	0	6
=	(Scotland)	Liam Smith	4	0	2	0	0	6
8	(Scotland)	Michael Hewitt	3	1	1	0	0	5
=	(England)	Brennan Dickenson	4	0	1	0	0	5
10	(Guadeloupe)	Benjamin Luissint	3	0	1	0	0	4
11	(Isle of Man)	Freddie O'Donoghue	0	0	3	0	0	3
12	(England)	Taylor Charters	1	0	1	0	0	2
=	(Scotland)	Jordan Allan	2	0	0	0	0	2
14	(Scotland)	Euan Ross	0	0	1	0	0	1

=== Clean sheets ===
R	Pos	Nat	Name	Scottish League One	League Cup	Challenge Cup	Scottish Cup	Play-offs	Total
1	GK	(Scotland)	Ross Stewart	7	1	0	0	0	8
26	GK	(New Zealand)	Lawton Green	0	0	0	0	0	0
34	GK	(Scotland)	Jamie Sneddon	1	0	0	0	0	1
Total				8	1	0	0	0	9

Last updated: 9 May 2026

== Team statistics ==
=== Scottish League One ===
==== League table ====
Pos	Team	Pld	W	D	L	GF	GA	GD	Pts	Promotion, qualification or relegation
1	Inverness Caledonian Thistle (C, P)	36	21	11	4	60	24	+36	69 (Note: Inverness Caledonian Thistle were deducted five points for entering administration during the previous season.)	Promotion to the Championship
2	Stenhousemuir (O, P)	36	18	13	5	50	27	+23	67	Qualification for the Championship play-offs
3	Queen of the South	36	14	12	10	58	47	+11	54	Qualification for the Championship play-offs
4	Alloa Athletic	36	15	8	13	50	38	+12	53	Qualification for the Championship play-offs
5	Peterhead	36	12	7	17	48	64	−16	43	

Rules for classification: 1) Points; 2) Goal difference; 3) Goals scored; 4) Head-to-head points; 5) Head-to-head goal difference; 6) Play-off (only for deciding promotion, play-off participation and relegation).
(C) Champions; (O) Play-off winners; (P) Promoted

==== Results by round ====
Round	1	2	3	4	5	6	7	8	9	10	11	12	13	14	15	16	17	18	19	20	21	22	23	24	25	26	27	28	29	30	31	32	33	34	35	36
Ground	A	H	H	A	H	A	H	A	H	A	A	H	H	A	A	H	A	H	H	A	H	A	H	A	H	A	H	H	A	H	A	A	H	A	H	A
Result	W	L	W	D	W	L	L	L	W	L	W	D	W	D	L	D	W	W	W	L	W	W	D	D	L	L	L	D	W	D	D	D	W	D	D	W
Position	3	5	2	2	1	3	6	7	6	7	6	6	4	5	6	5	4	4	3	3	3	3	3	3	3	4	4	4	4	4	4	4	4	4	4	3

Updated to match(es) played on 2 May 2026. Source:
A = Away; H = Home; W = Win; D = Draw; L = Loss

=== League Cup table ===
Pos	Team	Pld	W	PW	PL	L	GF	GA	GD	Pts	Qualification	PAR	ROS	STR	QOS	EDI
1	Partick Thistle	4	4	0	0	0	11	2	+9	12	Qualification for the second round	—	—	2–0	2–0	—
2	Ross County	4	2	0	1	1	11	4	+7	7		1–3	—	—	—	8–0
3	Stranraer	4	1	1	1	1	2	3	−1	6		—	p1–1	—	1–0	—
4	Queen of the South	4	1	0	0	3	4	4	0	3		—	0–1	—	—	4–0
5	Edinburgh City	4	0	1	0	3	1	16	−15	2		1–4	—	p0–0	—	—

Rules for classification: 1) goal difference, 2) goals scored, 3) away goals scored, 4) matches won, 5) away matches won, 6) drawing of lots.

=== Challenge Cup table ===
2025–26 Scottish Challenge Cup

=== Management statistics ===
Last updated 11 May 2026

Name	From	To	P	W	D	L	Win% (Note: Win% is the percentage of matches won rounded to two decimal places.)
Peter Murphy	15 July 2025	9 May 2026	51	19	15	17	37.25

== Transfers ==
=== Players in ===
Player	From	Fee
(Scotland) Jordan Allan	(Scotland) Falkirk	Free
(Scotland) Liam Smith	(Scotland) Queen of the South	Free
(Scotland) Ross Stewart	(Scotland) Queen of the South	Free
(Guadeloupe) Benjamin Luissint	(Scotland) Queen of the South	Free
(England) Matty Douglas	(Scotland) Queen of the South	Free
(England) Brennan Dickenson	(England) Queen of the South	Free
(Scotland) Harry McLinden	(Scotland) Queen of the South	Free
(Scotland) Euan Ross	(Scotland) Queen of the South	Free
(Scotland) Mark Thomson	(Scotland) Queen of the South	Free
(Scotland) Reece Lyon	(Scotland) Queen of the South	Free
(England) Jack Hannah	(England) Middlesbrough	Free
(Scotland) Kai Kennedy	(Scotland) Queen of the South	Free
(Scotland) Niall Rogerson	(Scotland) Queen of the South	Free
(England) Taylor Charters	(England) Carlisle United	Free
(Scotland) Michael Hewitt	(Scotland) Queen of the South	Free
(Scotland) Ben Johnstone	(Scotland) Queen of the South	Free
(England) Kurtis Guthrie	Jersey Bulls	Free
(England) Jack Stott	(England) Middlesbrough	Free
(Scotland) Cole Burke	(Scotland) Kilmarnock	Loan
(Scotland) Callum Penman	(Scotland) St Mirren	Loan
(Isle of Man) Freddie O'Donoghue	(England) Carlisle United	Loan
(Scotland) Zander MacKenzie	(Scotland) Partick Thistle	Loan
(Scotland) Kian Leslie	(Scotland) Kilmarnock	Loan
(Scotland) Corey Armour	(Scotland) Kilmarnock	Loan
(Zimbabwe) Menzi Mazwi	(England) Birmingham City	Loan
(England) Seb Mason	(England) Carlisle United	Loan
(Scotland) Nicky Clark	(Scotland) Ross County	Free
(Scotland) Jamie Sneddon	(Scotland) Falkirk	Free

=== Players out ===
Player	To	Fee
(Scotland) Kyle Doherty	Free Agent	Free
(Scotland) Josh Walker	Free Agent	Free
(Scotland) Daniel Church	Free Agent	Free
(Scotland) Lewis O'Donnell	(Scotland) Dundee United	Loan
(Scotland) Fraser Bryden	(Scotland) Ayr United	Loan
(England) Taylor Charters	(England) Carlisle United	Loan
(England) Jack Hannah	(England) Middlesbrough	Loan
(Scotland) Murray Johnson	(Scotland) Hibernian	Loan
(Scotland) Oscar MacIntyre	(Scotland) Hibernian	Loan
(Scotland) Harry Cochrane	(Scotland) Arbroath	Free
(Scotland) Adam Brooks	(Northern Ireland) Crusaders	Free
(Scotland) Jack Brydon	(Scotland) Kelty Hearts	Free
(Scotland) Mark Thomson	Free Agent	Free
(England) Harry McLinden	(Scotland) Forfar Athletic	Loan
(Isle of Man) Freddie O'Donoghue	(England) Carlisle United	Loan
(Scotland) Billy Gray	(Scotland) Dalbeattie Star	Loan
(Scotland) Kylan Hunter	(Scotland) Dalbeattie Star	Loan
(Scotland) Corey Armour	(Scotland) Kilmarnock	Loan

== See also ==
- List of Queen of the South F.C. seasons
