= 2025–26 Scottish Challenge Cup =

Tournament details
- Country: Scotland
- Dates: 12 August 2025 – 5 April 2026
- Teams: 40

Final positions
- Champions: Raith Rovers
- Runners-up: Inverness Caledonian Thistle

Tournament statistics
- Matches played: 121
- Goals scored: 452 (3.74 per match)
- Top goal scorer(s): Alfie Bavidge (10 goals)
- All statistics correct as of 5 April 2026.

The 2025–26 Scottish Challenge Cup, known as the KDM Evolution Trophy due to sponsorship reasons, was the 34th season of the competition. The total number of participating clubs was 40. The competition began on 12 August 2025 with the new league phase and the final took place on 5 April 2026.

Thirty teams from the Championship, League One and League Two competed, along with 10 B teams from the 12 clubs who compete in the Scottish Premiership.

The defending champions were Livingston, who were unable to defend their title due to being promoted to the Scottish Premiership.

== Format ==
Round	Date	Fixtures	Clubs	New entries
League Phase	12/13 August 2025 (matchday 1); 26/27 August 2025 (matchday 2); 5/6 September 2025 (matchday 3); 23/24 September 2025 (matchday 4); 10/11 October 2025 (matchday 5); 11/17/19 November 2025 (matchday 6)	90	40 → 32	10 teams from 2025–26 Scottish League One 10 teams from 2025–26 Scottish League Two; 10 U21 teams from 2025–26 Scottish Premiership
Second round	9 December 2025	16	32 → 16	10 teams from 2025–26 Scottish Championship
Third round	6 January 2026	8	16 → 8	
Quarter-Finals	27/28 January 2026	4	8 → 4	
Semi-Finals	24/25 February 2026	2	4 → 2	
Final	28/29 March or 4/5 April 2026	1	2 → 1	

== League phase ==
The draw was made on 17 July 2025 at 13:00 and broadcast live on the SPFL YouTube Channel. The draw was regionalised and divided into 3 pots. The matches were played from 12 August 2025 to 19 November 2025.

=== North Section ===
==== Draw ====
Teams entering the competition in the league phase:

Pot A	Pot B	Pot C
Cove Rangers; Inverness Caledonian Thistle; Montrose; Peterhead	Elgin City; Forfar Athletic; Stirling Albion; The Spartans	Aberdeen B; Dundee B; Dundee United B; Hibernian B

=== South Section ===
==== Draw ====
Teams entering the competition in the league phase:

Pot A	Pot B	Pot C
Alloa Athletic; East Fife; Hamilton Academical; Kelty Hearts; Queen of the South; Stenhousemuir	Annan Athletic; Clyde; Dumbarton; East Kilbride; Edinburgh City; Stranraer	Celtic B; Heart of Midlothian B; Kilmarnock B; Motherwell B; Rangers B; St Mirren B

==== League phase matches ====
12 August 2025	Clyde	1–3	Celtic B	Hamilton
19:45	Leitch 52'		Osmand 12'; McArdle 27'; Isiguzo 43'	Stadium: New Douglas Park; Attendance: 252; Referee: Peter Stuart

12 August 2025	Cove Rangers	1–1	The Spartans	Aberdeen
19:45	Darge 56'		Stowe 81'	Stadium: Balmoral Stadium; Attendance: 256; Referee: Sean Murdoch

12 August 2025	Dumbarton	4–2	St Mirren B	Dumbarton
19:45	Tomlinson 20'; Johnston 35'; Wallace 61'; Docherty 86'		Mooney 55'; Taylor 69'	Stadium: Dumbarton Football Stadium; Attendance: 317; Referee: Graham Grainger

12 August 2025	East Fife	4–1	Heart of Midlothian B	Methil
19:45	Bah 45'; Austin 63', 72', 85'		North 6'	Stadium: Bayview Stadium; Attendance: 301; Referee: Daniel Graves

12 August 2025	East Kilbride	3–1	Queen of the South	East Kilbride
19:45	Dobbie 19', 57'; Leitch 80'		Guthrie 8'	Stadium: K-Park Training Academy; Attendance: 500; Referee: Lewis Hogarth

12 August 2025	Elgin City	1–4	Inverness Caledonian Thistle	Elgin
19:45	Gallagher 85'		Bavidge 47', 90' (pen.); Thompson 50'; Allan 62'	Stadium: Borough Briggs; Attendance: 852; Referee: Gary Hanvidge

12 August 2025	Forfar Athletic	1–0	Hibernian B	Forfar
19:45	Richardson 18'			Stadium: Station Park; Attendance: 273; Referee: Greg Soutar

12 August 2025	Kelty Hearts	1–0	Annan Athletic	Kelty
19:45	Murray 72' (pen.)			Stadium: New Central Park; Attendance: 177; Referee: Gavin Duncan

12 August 2025	Montrose	5–2	Dundee B	Montrose
19:45	Loudon 4', 20'; Clark 26'; Sandilands 35', 39'		Rooney 80'; Howett 87'	Stadium: Links Park; Attendance: 321; Referee: Jordan Curran

12 August 2025	Peterhead	4–2	Aberdeen B	Peterhead
19:45	Mercer 20' (o.g.); Colloty 33'; McGinn 73'; Shanks 77'		Searle 49'; Stephen 62'	Stadium: Balmoor Stadium; Attendance: 584; Referee: Joel Kennedy

12 August 2025	Stenhousemuir	2–1	Rangers B	Stenhousemuir
19:45	McGill 13'; Graham 23'		Hutton 75'	Stadium: Ochilview Park; Attendance: 164; Referee: Cameron Stirling

12 August 2025	Stirling Albion	0–3	Dundee United B	Stirling
19:45			Franczak 27'; Welsh 40'; Anderson 85'	Stadium: Forthbank Stadium; Attendance: 217; Referee: Jamie Wilkie

12 August 2025	Stranraer	2–1	Alloa Athletic	Stranraer
19:45	Dolan 51'; Turay 84'		Clarke 56'	Stadium: Stair Park; Attendance: 324; Referee: Stewart Luke

13 August 2025	Edinburgh City	1–0	Kilmarnock B	Edinburgh
19:45	McArthur 56'			Stadium: Meadowbank Stadium; Attendance: 86; Referee: Alastair Grieve

13 August 2025	Hamilton Academical	0–0	Motherwell B	Cumbernauld
19:45				Stadium: Broadwood Stadium; Attendance: 215; Referee: Connor Ashwood

26 August 2025	Stranraer	4–1	Rangers B	Stranraer
19:30	Sharp 11'; Stuart 44'; O'Donnell 80' (pen.); Rough 89'		McCallion 61' (pen.)	Stadium: Stair Park; Attendance: 554; Referee: Sean Murdoch

26 August 2025	Alloa Athletic	2–3	St Mirren B	Alloa
19:45	Bruin 90'; Rankin 90'		Mooney 45'; Taylor 51'; Calvin 90'	Stadium: Recreation Park; Attendance: 191; Referee: Greg Soutar

26 August 2025	Annan Athletic	1–3	Stenhousemuir	Annan
19:45	Trialist 52'		N.Jamieson 43'; Taylor 62'; Carrick 82'	Stadium: Galabank; Attendance: 153; Referee: Lewis Hogarth

26 August 2025	Cove Rangers	1–0	Dundee B	Aberdeen
19:45	Eguaibor 70'			Stadium: Balmoral Stadium; Attendance: 220; Referee: Jamie Wilkie

26 August 2025	Dumbarton	1–0	Heart of Midlothian B	Dumbarton
19:45	Honeyman 70'			Stadium: Dumbarton Football Stadium; Attendance: 276; Referee: Alastair Grieve

26 August 2025	East Fife	3–2	Kilmarnock B	Methil
19:45	Austin 4', 51'; Goss 24'		Bowie 26'; Barlow 80'	Stadium: Bayview Stadium; Attendance: 314; Referee: Stewart Luke

26 August 2025	East Kilbride	3–1	Motherwell B	East Kilbride
19:45	Healy 26'; Leitch 30'; Hamilton 62'		Lawson 84'	Stadium: K-Park Training Academy; Attendance: 200; Referee: Lloyd Wilson

26 August 2025	Elgin City	3–1	Dundee United B	Elgin
19:45	Walker 26'; Hester 45', 83'		Forrest 51'	Stadium: Borough Briggs; Attendance: 288; Referee: Joel Kennedy

26 August 2025	Inverness Caledonian Thistle	4–1	Aberdeen B	Inverness
19:45	Zimba 12', 77', 82'; McKay 89'		Stephen 9'	Stadium: Caledonian Stadium; Attendance: 507; Referee: George Calder

26 August 2025	Kelty Hearts	0–1	Celtic B	Kelty
19:45			Hale 28'	Stadium: New Central Park; Attendance: 234; Referee: Connor Ashwood

26 August 2025	Montrose	1–0	Forfar Athletic	Montrose
19:45	Machado 77'			Stadium: Links Park; Attendance: 446; Referee: Gary Hanvidge

26 August 2025	Queen of the South	3–1	Clyde	Dumfries
19:45	Guthrie 21', 72'; Charters 78'		Leitch 46'	Stadium: Palmerston Park; Attendance: 496; Referee: Josh Hay

26 August 2025	Stirling Albion	3–1	Hibernian B	Stirling
19:45	Harkness 20'; Shanley 58'; McLean 86'		Molotnikov 35'	Stadium: Forthbank Stadium; Attendance: 125; Referee: Chris Graham

26 August 2025	The Spartans	1–1	Peterhead	Edinburgh
19:45	Henderson 77'		McGuffie 88'	Stadium: Ainslie Park; Attendance: 133; Referee: Calum Scott

27 August 2025	Hamilton Academical	2–3	Edinburgh City	Cumbernauld
19:45	McKinstry 19'; O'Hara 52'		Jarvis 29'; Lawson 73'; Duncan 75'	Stadium: Broadwood Stadium; Attendance: 225; Referee: Cameron Stirling

5 September 2025	Inverness Caledonian Thistle	2–1	Stirling Albion	Inverness
20:00	Zimba 35'; Sole 90'		Cunningham 31'	Stadium: Caledonian Stadium; Attendance: 543; Referee: Graham Grainger

6 September 2025	Alloa Athletic	5–4	Celtic B	Alloa
15:00	Foster 40'; Orsi 51'; Buchanan 60'; Sammon 68'; Roberts 87'		Ure 33'; Bonnar 53'; McArdle 55'; Summers 57'	Stadium: Recreation Park; Attendance: 309; Referee: Peter Stuart

6 September 2025	Annan Athletic	2–2	St Mirren B	Annan
15:00	Smith 64' (pen.); Maxwell 86'		Calvin 20'; Thompson 90' (pen.)	Stadium: Galabank; Attendance: 252; Referee: Sean Murdoch

6 September 2025	Clyde	4–0	Motherwell B	Hamilton
15:00	Hilton 15'; Connell 28', 80'; Nevans 42'			Stadium: New Douglas Park; Attendance: 248; Referee: Greg Soutar

6 September 2025	East Fife	1–1	Dumbarton	Methil
15:00	Austin 35'		Honeyman 90'	Stadium: Bayview Stadium; Attendance: 578; Referee: Duncan Williams

6 September 2025	East Kilbride	2–4	Hamilton Academical	East Kilbride
15:00	Robertson 53' (pen.), 82'		Shaw 40'; O'Hara 45', 66'; McKinstry 87'	Stadium: K-Park Training Academy; Attendance: 602; Referee: Dan McFarlane

6 September 2025	Edinburgh City	4–2	Heart of Midlothian B	Edinburgh
15:00	Mahon 13', 21'; Lawson 33'; Stokes 38'		McLuckie 41'; Robb 90' (pen.)	Stadium: Meadowbank Stadium; Attendance: 229; Referee: Ross Birrell

6 September 2025	Elgin City	1–0	Cove Rangers	Elgin
15:00	Walker 30'			Stadium: Borough Briggs; Attendance: 475; Referee: Stewart Luke

6 September 2025	Forfar Athletic	4–1	Dundee B	Forfar
15:00	Rennie 21'; Sutherland 38' (pen.); Slater 78'; Cannon 83'		Allan 18'	Stadium: Station Park; Attendance: 457; Referee: Lewis Hogarth

6 September 2025	Kelty Hearts	3–0	Stranraer	Kelty
15:00	Johnston 47'; Murray 68'; Campbell 90'			Stadium: New Central Park; Attendance: 304; Referee: Josh Hay

6 September 2025	Montrose	3–1	Aberdeen B	Montrose
15:00	Towler 33'; Loudon 39'; Webster 67'		Duncan 7'	Stadium: Links Park; Attendance: 453; Referee: Alastair Grieve

6 September 2025	Peterhead	3–0	Dundee United B	Peterhead
15:00	Mackie 10'; Ross 18'; McCarthy 90'			Stadium: Balmoor Stadium; Attendance: 578; Referee: Jamie Wilkie

6 September 2025	Queen of the South	2–1	Rangers B	Dumfries
15:00	Luissint 49'; O'Donoghue 73'		Christie 65'	Stadium: Palmerston Park; Attendance: 946; Referee: Cameron Stirling

6 September 2025	Stenhousemuir	4–0	Kilmarnock B	Stenhousemuir
15:00	Buchanan 20'; O'Reilly 38'; Aitken 48'; Taylor 54'			Stadium: Ochilview Park; Attendance: 203; Referee: Iain Snedden

6 September 2025	The Spartans	5–1	Hibernian B	Edinburgh
15:00	Welsh 23'; Russell 32' (pen.), 68'; Stowe 55'; Whyte 64'		Clelland 80' (pen.)	Stadium: Ainslie Park; Attendance: 383; Referee: George Calder

23 September 2025	Alloa Athletic	3–0	Kilmarnock B	Alloa
19:45	Rankin 34', 63'; Sammon 78'			Stadium: Recreation Park; Attendance: 125; Referee: Connor Ashwood

23 September 2025	Annan Athletic	4–3	Rangers B	Annan
19:45	P.Smith 6'; Craik 45'; A.Smith 52'; Gaffney 71'		Adamson 9'; Burnside 19', 70'	Stadium: Galabank; Attendance: 262; Referee: Duncan Williams

23 September 2025	Clyde	2–1	East Fife	Hamilton
19:45	Williamson 17'; Redfern 85'		Jones 90'	Stadium: New Douglas Park; Attendance: 191; Referee: Joel Kennedy

23 September 2025	Cove Rangers	1–1	Hibernian B	Aberdeen
19:45	Harrington 73'		Clelland 53'	Stadium: Balmoral Stadium; Attendance: 164; Referee: Greg Soutar

23 September 2025	Dumbarton	3–3	Kelty Hearts	Dumbarton
19:45	Honeyman 20'; Arnott 40' (o.g.); Wallace 45'		Arnott 25' (pen.), 37' (pen.); Cole 26'	Stadium: Dumbarton Football Stadium; Attendance: 312; Referee: Gavin Duncan

23 September 2025	Forfar Athletic	3–0	Aberdeen B	Forfar
19:45	Morrison 20'; Inglis 62'		Teasdale 49'	Stadium: Station Park; Attendance: 254; Referee: Cameron Stirling

23 September 2025	Inverness Caledonian Thistle	6–0	Dundee B	Inverness
19:45	Robertson 15'; Alonge 23'; McKay 37'; Allan 52'; Bavidge 76'; Sole 86'			Stadium: Caledonian Stadium; Attendance: 430; Referee: Daniel Graves

23 September 2025	Peterhead	1–1	Elgin City	Peterhead
19:45	Shanks 71'		O'Connor 19'	Stadium: Balmoor Stadium; Attendance: 524; Referee: Sean Murdoch

23 September 2025	Queen of the South	2–3	Heart of Midlothian B	Dumfries
19:45	O'Donoghue 24'; Hewitt 34'		North 73'; McLuckie 75'; Douglas 81' (o.g.)	Stadium: Palmerston Park; Attendance: 721; Referee: Jamie Wilkie

23 September 2025	Stenhousemuir	3–0	East Kilbride	Stenhousemuir
19:45	Taylor 4'; Anderson 65'; Whyte 74'			Stadium: Ochilview Park; Attendance: 158; Referee: Euan Anderson

23 September 2025	Stirling Albion	1–2	Montrose	Stirling
19:45	Shanley 6'		May 18'; Clark 26'	Stadium: Forthbank Stadium; Attendance: 253; Referee: Peter Stuart

23 September 2025	Stranraer	3–0	Motherwell B	Stranraer
19:45	Lang 24'; McManus 45'; Turay 72'			Stadium: Stair Park; Attendance: 288; Referee: Lewis Hogarth

23 September 2025	The Spartans	1–0	Dundee United B	Edinburgh
19:45	Wylie 57'			Stadium: Ainslie Park; Attendance: 132; Referee: Stewart Luke

24 September 2025	Edinburgh City	2–1	Celtic B	Edinburgh
19:45	Duncan 54'; Lawson 66'		Osmand 41'	Stadium: Meadowbank Stadium; Attendance: 132; Referee: Graham Grainger

24 September 2025	Hamilton Academical	3–1	St Mirren B	Cumbernauld
19:45	O'Hara 17'; Shaw 34', 35'		Lavery 63'	Stadium: Broadwood Stadium; Attendance: 325; Referee: Josh Hay

10 October 2025	Clyde	2–1	Kilmarnock B	Hamilton
19:45	Williamson 27'; Niang 30'		Bowie 74'	Stadium: New Douglas Park; Attendance: 252; Referee: Gary Hanvidge

10 October 2025	East Fife	5–3	Celtic B	Methil
19:45	Austin 34', 70'; McKenna 65', 90'; Norey 73'		Summers 3'; Isiguzo 56'; Rachwal 89'	Stadium: Bayview Stadium; Attendance: 616; Referee: George Calder

11 October 2025	Cove Rangers	5–1	Dundee United B	Aberdeen
15:00	Mylchreest 22', 74'; Megginson 25'; Eguaibor 30', 48'		Leiper 72'	Stadium: Balmoral Stadium; Attendance: 248; Referee: Daniel Graves

11 October 2025	Dumbarton	1–0	Rangers B	Dumbarton
15:00	Webster 57'			Stadium: Dumbarton Football Stadium; Attendance: 617; Referee: Joel Kennedy

11 October 2025	East Kilbride	3–2	Heart of Midlothian B	East Kilbride
15:00	Robertson 21', 52' (pen.); Young 90'		Dow 28'; Muirhead 78'	Stadium: K-Park Training Academy; Attendance: 315; Referee: Greg Soutar

11 October 2025	Edinburgh City	1–2	Alloa Athletic	Edinburgh
15:00	Mitchell 25'		Rankin 50'; Sammon 53'	Stadium: Meadowbank Stadium; Attendance: 189; Referee: Colin Steven

11 October 2025	Elgin City	2–2	Aberdeen B	Elgin
15:00	Sargent 10'; Hester 89'		Teasdale 14', 21'	Stadium: Borough Briggs; Attendance: 678; Referee: Peter Stuart

11 October 2025	Forfar Athletic	1–4	Inverness Caledonian Thistle	Forfar
15:00	Rennie 26'		MacLeod 49'; MacKinnon 55'; Longstaff 63'; McKay 90'	Stadium: Station Park; Attendance: 512; Referee: Euan Anderson

11 October 2025	Hamilton Academical	1–2	Annan Athletic	Cumbernauld
15:00	Morgan 47'		Dixon 81'; Hooper 90'	Stadium: Broadwood Stadium; Attendance: 250; Referee: Iain Snedden

11 October 2025	Kelty Hearts	2–1	St Mirren B	Kelty
15:00	Diack 24', 77'		Douglas 15'	Stadium: New Central Park; Attendance: 222; Referee: Stewart Luke

11 October 2025	Montrose	3–1	The Spartans	Montrose
15:00	Williamson 28'; Gibson 35'; McClenents 80'		Tapping 30'	Stadium: Links Park; Attendance: 435; Referee: Dan McFarlane

11 October 2025	Peterhead	0–4	Hibernian B	Peterhead
15:00			McMurdo 10'; Mitchell 19'; Davidson 39'; McDonald 77'	Stadium: Balmoor Stadium; Attendance: 619; Referee: Gavin Duncan

11 October 2025	Stenhousemuir	4–0	Motherwell B	Stenhousemuir
15:00	Buchanan 30'; Carrick 37'; Aitken 49'; Gray 59'			Stadium: Ochilview Park; Attendance: 223; Referee: Ryan Lee

11 October 2025	Stirling Albion	2–0	Dundee B	Stirling
15:00	McLean 30'; Shanley 84'			Stadium: Forthbank Stadium; Attendance: 331; Referee: Alastair Grieve

11 October 2025	Stranraer	1–1	Queen of the South	Stranraer
15:00	Turay 61'		Smith 89'	Stadium: Stair Park; Attendance: 565; Referee: Cameron Stirling

11 November 2025	Alloa Athletic	4–4	Clyde	Alloa
19:45	Clarke 25', 56', 79'; Gallagher 45'		Redfern 7'; Williamson 52', 55' (pen.); Sutherland 66'	Stadium: Recreation Park; Attendance: 216; Referee: Calum Scott

11 November 2025	Cove Rangers	1–2	Forfar Athletic	Aberdeen
19:45	McAllister 65'		Whatley 13', 36'	Stadium: Balmoral Stadium; Attendance: 154; Referee: George Calder

11 November 2025	East Fife	3–0	Edinburgh City	Methil
19:45	McManus 7'; Millar 25'; Slattery 71'			Stadium: Bayview Stadium; Attendance: 377; Referee: Ryan Lee

11 November 2025	East Kilbride	2–0	Celtic B	East Kilbride
19:45	Robertson 63'; See 83'			Stadium: K-Park Training Academy; Attendance: 365; Referee: Josh Hay

11 November 2025	Elgin City	3–1	Dundee B	Elgin
19:45	Obasoto 23'; Hester 67'; Sargent 72'		Hughes 70'	Stadium: Borough Briggs; Attendance: 242; Referee: Sean Murdoch

11 November 2025	Hamilton Academical	3–0	Rangers B	Cumbernauld
19:45	O'Hara 59'; Bradley 77'; Hynd 79' (o.g.)			Stadium: Broadwood Stadium; Attendance: 268; Referee: Gavin Duncan

11 November 2025	Inverness Caledonian Thistle	6–0	Dundee United B	Inverness
19:45	Zimba 7', 19', 43'; Bavidge 50', 89'; Alonge 51'			Stadium: Caledonian Stadium; Attendance: 390; Referee: Alastair Grieve

11 November 2025	Kelty Hearts	0–1	Heart of Midlothian B	Kelty
19:45			Dow 86'	Stadium: New Central Park; Attendance: 121; Referee: Gary Hanvidge

11 November 2025	Stirling Albion	2–1	Peterhead	Stirling
19:45	McLean 17'; Brown 42'		Shanks 90'	Stadium: Forthbank Stadium; Attendance: 203; Referee: Cameron Stirling

11 November 2025	Stranraer	2–0	St Mirren B	Stranraer
19:45	Lang 5', 12'			Stadium: Stair Park; Attendance: 200; Referee: Connor Ashwood

11 November 2025	The Spartans	5–2	Aberdeen B	Edinburgh
19:45	Dall 34'; Ndlovu 44'; Russell 63', 67' (pen.); Stowe 90'		Searle 17'; Ross 27'	Stadium: Ainslie Park; Attendance: 264; Referee: Jordan Curran

11 November 2025	Queen of the South	3–1	Motherwell B	Dumfries
20:00	Smith 60'; Lyon 67'; Ross 78'		Watson 49'	Stadium: Palmerston Park; Attendance: 307; Referee: Jamie Wilkie

11 November 2025	Annan Athletic	6–0	Kilmarnock B	Annan
20:45	Kalala 33'; Smith 36', 38', 56'; Dixon 63'; Gaffney 85'			Stadium: Galabank; Attendance: 143; Referee: Duncan Williams

17 November 2025	Montrose	4–4	Hibernian B	Montrose
19:45	Leddie 11'; Waddell 20'; McClenents 81'; Webster 89' (pen.)		Clelland 16' (pen.), 24'; Calder 36'; McMurdo 80'	Stadium: Links Park; Attendance: 175; Referee: Lewis Hogarth

19 November 2025	Dumbarton	0–2	Stenhousemuir	Dumbarton
19:45			Taylor 45'; O'Reilly 86'	Stadium: Dumbarton Football Stadium; Attendance: 253; Referee: Joel Kennedy

Notes

1. A- Aberdeen B fielded an ineligible player in their match away to Forfar Athletic and the match was awarded 3-0 to Forfar Athletic. The match had originally finished 2–1 to Forfar Athletic.

==== League phase table ====
Pos	Team	Pld	W	D	L	GF	GA	GD	Pts	Qualification
1	Inverness Caledonian Thistle	6	6	0	0	26	4	+22	18	Advance to Second round
2	Stenhousemuir	6	6	0	0	18	2	+16	18	Advance to Second round
3	Montrose	6	5	1	0	18	9	+9	16	Advance to Second round
4	East Fife	6	4	1	1	17	9	+8	13	Advance to Second round
5	Stranraer	6	4	1	1	12	6	+6	13	Advance to Second round
6	Forfar Athletic	6	4	0	2	11	7	+4	12	Advance to Second round
7	East Kilbride	6	4	0	2	13	11	+2	12	Advance to Second round
8	Edinburgh City	6	4	0	2	11	10	+1	12	Advance to Second round
9	The Spartans	6	3	2	1	14	8	+6	11	Advance to Second round
10	Elgin City	6	3	2	1	11	9	+2	11	Advance to Second round
11	Dumbarton	6	3	2	1	10	8	+2	11	Advance to Second round
12	Annan Athletic	6	3	1	2	15	10	+5	10	Advance to Second round
13	Alloa Athletic	6	3	1	2	17	14	+3	10	Advance to Second round
14	Kelty Hearts	6	3	1	2	9	6	+3	10	Advance to Second round
15	Clyde	6	3	1	2	14	12	+2	10	Advance to Second round
16	Queen of the South	6	3	1	2	12	10	+2	10	Advance to Second round
17	Hamilton Academical	6	3	1	2	13	8	+5	9 (Note: Hamilton Academical were deducted 1 point for breaching SPFL rules regarding amateur players.)	Advance to Second round
18	Stirling Albion	6	3	0	3	9	9	0	9	Advance to Second round
19	Cove Rangers	6	2	2	2	9	6	+3	8	Advance to Second round
20	Peterhead	6	2	2	2	10	10	0	8	Advance to Second round
21	Celtic B	6	2	0	4	12	15	−3	6	Advance to Second round
22	Heart of Midlothian B	6	2	0	4	9	14	−5	6	Advance to Second round
23	Hibernian B	6	1	2	3	11	14	−3	5	
24	St Mirren B	6	1	1	4	9	15	−6	4	
25	Dundee United B	6	1	0	5	5	18	−13	3	
26	Aberdeen B	6	0	1	5	8	21	−13	1	
27	Motherwell B	6	0	1	5	2	17	−15	1	
28	Rangers B	6	0	0	6	6	16	−10	0	
29	Kilmarnock B	6	0	0	6	3	19	−16	0	
30	Dundee B	6	0	0	6	4	21	−17	0	

Source: SPFL
Rules for classification: 1) Points; 2) Goal difference; 3) Goals scored; 4) Head-to-to head points; 5) Head-to-head goal difference; 6) Play-off (only for deciding qualification).

== Second round ==
The draw for the second round was made on 21 November at 1pm live on the SPFL YouTube channel.

=== Draw ===
Teams that enter the competition in the second round.

- Airdrieonians
- Arbroath
- Ayr United
- Dunfermline Athletic
- Greenock Morton
- Partick Thistle
- Queen's Park
- Raith Rovers
- Ross County
- St Johnstone

==== Matches ====
9 December 2025	Ross County	4–0	Celtic B	Dingwall
19:45	Henderson 41'; Docherty 47'; Lindsay 81', 85'			Stadium: Victoria Park; Attendance: 479; Referee: Joel Kennedy

9 December 2025	Ayr United	2–1	Peterhead	Ayr
19:45	Dowds 13'; McAllister 49'		Pawlett 27'	Stadium: Somerset Park; Attendance: 581; Referee: Peter Stuart

9 December 2025	Raith Rovers	5–2	Hamilton Academical	Kirkcaldy
19:45	O'Connor 5'; Brown 51'; Rowe 58', 81', 87'		Cameron 40', 79'	Stadium: Stark's Park; Attendance: 596; Referee: Graham Grainger

9 December 2025	Stirling Albion	2–2 (5–4 p)	Greenock Morton	Stirling
19:45	McNab 33'; McLean 45'		Shaw 5' (pen.); Robertson 34'	Stadium: Forthbank Stadium; Attendance: 291; Referee: Duncan Nicolson
	Penalties
	McLean (penalty scored); Cunningham (penalty scored); McNab (penalty scored); Banner (penalty scored); Carse (penalty scored)		Moffat (penalty scored); Wilson (penalty scored); MacPherson (penalty scored); Garrity (penalty scored); Ballantyne (penalty missed)

9 December 2025	Arbroath	3–2	Kelty Hearts	Arbroath
19:45	Dow 44'; Pettifer 84'; Mebude 87'		Ferguson 16'; Paterson 41'	Stadium: Gayfield Park; Attendance: 510; Referee: Daniel Graves

9 December 2025	Alloa Athletic	2–3	Airdrieonians	Alloa
19:45	O'Donnell 34'; Buchanan 37'		Cooper 18'; Xavier-Jones 24'; MacDonald 77'	Stadium: Recreation Park; Attendance: 319; Referee: Iain Snedden

9 December 2025	Stenhousemuir	2–0	Annan Athletic	Stenhousemuir
19:45	Taylor 35', 53'			Stadium: Ochilview Park; Attendance: 84; Referee: George Calder

9 December 2025	Forfar Athletic	1–1 (4–2 p)	Edinburgh City	Forfar
19:45	Rennie 57'		Mahon 43'	Stadium: Station Park; Attendance: 287; Referee: Connor Ashwood
	Penalties
	Whatley (penalty scored); Shepherd (penalty scored); Rennie (penalty missed); Sutherland (penalty scored); Bright (penalty scored)		Jarvis (penalty missed); Lawson (penalty scored); Guthrie (penalty scored); Mitchell (penalty missed)

9 December 2025	East Kilbride	1–4	Stranraer	East Kilbride
19:45	Breen 67'		Russell 33' (pen.); Lang 52'; McManus 76'; Hunter 77'	Stadium: K-Park Training Academy; Attendance: 189; Referee: Stewart Luke

16 December 2025	Dumbarton	0–9	Inverness Caledonian Thistle	Dumbarton
19:45			Bavidge 4', 27', 31', 37'; MacLeod 22'; McKay 23', 81'; Longstaff 43'; Millen 65' (pen.)	Stadium: Dumbarton Football Stadium; Attendance: 326; Referee: Jordan Curran

16 December 2025	Elgin City	2–3	East Fife	Elgin
19:45	Dingwall 77' (pen.); Colloty 85'		Austin 9'; Peggie 60'; McKenna 63' (pen.)	Stadium: Borough Briggs; Attendance: 328; Referee: Gary Hanvidge

16 December 2025	Queen of the South	4–3	Dunfermline Athletic	Dumfries
19:45	Guthrie 6'; Stott 11'; O'Donoghue 74'; Dickenson 76'		MacLeod 41'; Stewart 79', 83'	Stadium: Palmerston Park; Attendance: 484; Referee: Jamie Wilkie

16 December 2025	Cove Rangers	1–2	Partick Thistle	Aberdeen
19:45	Emslie 3'		Turner 24'; Samuel 27'	Stadium: Balmoral Stadium; Attendance: 389; Referee: Gavin Duncan

16 December 2025	Heart of Midlothian B	0–1	St Johnstone	Edinburgh
19:45			Gullan 76'	Stadium: Ainslie Park; Attendance: 375; Referee: Josh Hay

16 December 2025	Queen's Park	2–1	Clyde	Glasgow
19:45	Drozd 22'; Fowler 47'		Williamson 45'	Stadium: Lesser Hampden; Attendance: 495; Referee: Alastair Grieve

22 December 2025	Montrose	2–1	The Spartans	Aberdeen
19:45	Brown 10'; Lyons 75'		Aiken 63'	Stadium: Balmoral Stadium; Attendance: 162; Referee: Lewis Hogarth

== Third round ==
The draw was made on 11 December at 1pm live on the SPFL YouTube channel.

Teams in bold advanced to the quarter-finals.

Teams in italics were not known at the time of the draw.

Championship	League One	League Two
**Airdrieonians**; **Arbroath**; **Ayr United**; Partick Thistle; **Queen's Park**; **Raith Rovers**; Ross County; **St Johnstone**	East Fife; **Inverness Caledonian Thistle**; Montrose; Queen of the South; **Stenhousemuir**	Forfar Athletic; Stirling Albion; Stranraer

=== Matches ===
6 January 2026	**Raith Rovers**	**1–0**	Queen of the South	Kirkcaldy
19:45	Easton 37' (pen.)			Stadium: Stark's Park; Attendance: 854; Referee: Josh Hay

6 January 2026	**Airdrieonians**	**3–1**	Montrose	Airdrie
19:45	Gallagher 47'; Mochrie 60'; Henderson 81'		Loudon 61'	Stadium: Excelsior Stadium; Attendance: 401; Referee: Iain Snedden

13 January 2026	**Queen's Park**	**2–0**	Forfar Athletic	Glasgow
19:45	Fowler 86'; McLeish 90'			Stadium: Lesser Hampden; Attendance: 338; Referee: Gavin Duncan

13 January 2026	Stirling Albion	**1–2**	**Stenhousemuir**	Stirling
19:45	McLean 39' (pen.)		Whyte 13', 66'	Stadium: Forthbank Stadium; Attendance: 435; Referee: Duncan Williams

13 January 2026	Partick Thistle	**3–3** (**2–4** p)	**Inverness Caledonian Thistle**	Glasgow
19:45	Chalmers 11'; Loughrey 61'; Samuel 62'		MacIntyre 23'; McKay 39', 84'	Stadium: Firhill Stadium; Attendance: 1,370; Referee: Euan Anderson
	**Penalties**
	Chalmers (penalty scored); Turner (penalty missed); McBeth (penalty missed); Fitzpatrick (penalty scored)		Allan (penalty scored); Zimba (penalty scored); Wotherspoon (penalty scored); McKay (penalty scored)

13 January 2026	**Ayr United**	**4–1**	Stranraer	Ayr
19:45	Main 11'; Dempsey 42' (pen.); Finney 45'; Thomas 71'		Hughes 22'	Stadium: Somerset Park; Attendance: 1,158; Referee: Colin Steven

13 January 2026	**Arbroath**	**3–0**	East Fife	Arbroath
19:45	Marshall 30', 50'; McManus 90' (o.g.)			Stadium: Gayfield Park; Attendance: 750; Referee: Lewis Hogarth

13 January 2026	**St Johnstone**	**2–0**	Ross County	Perth
19:45	McPake 18'; Lloyd 48'			Stadium: McDiarmid Park; Attendance: 1,815; Referee: Grant Irvine

== Quarter-finals ==
The draw was made on 15 January at 1pm live on the SPFL YouTube channel.

Teams in bold advanced to the semi-finals.

Championship	League One
**Airdrieonians**; Arbroath; **Ayr United**; Queen's Park; **Raith Rovers**; St Johnstone	**Inverness Caledonian Thistle**; Stenhousemuir

=== Matches ===
27 January 2026	Queen's Park	**1–1** (**1–3** p)	**Raith Rovers**	Glasgow
19:45	Fowler 73'		Nsio 32'	Stadium: Lesser Hampden; Attendance: 524; Referee: Sean Murdoch
	**Penalties**
	Savoury (penalty scored); Drozd (penalty missed); Connolly (penalty missed); MacGregor (penalty missed)		Brown (penalty missed); Mullin (penalty scored); McMullan (penalty scored); Doherty (penalty scored)

27 January 2026	**Inverness Caledonian Thistle**	**1–0**	Stenhousemuir	Inverness
19:45	Bavidge 73'			Stadium: Caledonian Stadium; Attendance: 1,114; Referee: Peter Stuart

3 February 2026	Arbroath	**2–2** (**3–5** p)	**Airdrieonians**	Arbroath
19:45	Muirhead 35'; Robinson 59'		McGrattan 62'; Henderson 79'	Stadium: Gayfield Park; Attendance: 535; Referee: Grant Irvine
	**Penalties**
	Reilly (penalty scored); Marshall (penalty missed); Wilkie (penalty scored); MacIntyre (penalty scored)		Henderson (penalty scored); Barjonas (penalty scored); McGrattan (penalty scored); Mochrie (penalty scored); McKinnon (penalty scored)

17 February 2026	St Johnstone	**3–3** (**4–5** p)	**Ayr United**	Falkirk
19:45	McPake 30' (pen.); Smith 89'; Gullan 90'		Oakley 15', 29'; Holt 47'	Stadium: Falkirk Stadium; Attendance: 999; Referee: Lloyd Wilson
	**Penalties**
	Gullan (penalty scored); Mallan (penalty missed); Boyes (penalty scored); Fotheringham (penalty scored); Steven (penalty scored); Foulds (penalty missed)		Dempsey (penalty scored); Bannigan (penalty scored); McKenzie (penalty missed); Walker (penalty scored); Holt (penalty scored); McMann (penalty scored)

== Semi-finals ==
The draw was made on 15 January at 1pm along with the quarter-final draw.

=== Matches ===
24 February 2026	Ayr United	1–2	Inverness Caledonian Thistle	Ayr
19:30	Finney 34'		Alonge 27', 82'	Stadium: Somerset Park; Attendance: 1,768; Referee: Peter Stuart

25 February 2026	Airdrieonians	1–1 (3–5 p)	Raith Rovers	Airdrie
19:45	Hastie 88'		Easton 56'	Stadium: Excelsior Stadium; Attendance: 1,284; Referee: Sean Murdoch
	Penalties
	Stirton (penalty scored); Mochrie (penalty scored); McGrattan (penalty missed); Hastie (penalty scored)		Mullin (penalty scored); Hanlon (penalty scored); Matthews (penalty scored); Rowe (penalty scored); Cameron (penalty scored)

== Final ==
5 April 2026	Raith Rovers	4–1	Inverness Caledonian Thistle	Glasgow
16:10	Cameron 29', 55'; Easton 60', 69'		Stewart 37'	Stadium: Firhill Stadium; Attendance: 4,812; Referee: Ryan Lee
