= 2022–23 Livingston F.C. season =

Livingston
2022–23 season
- Chairman: Robert Wilson
- Manager: David Martindale
- Stadium: Almondvale Stadium
- Scottish Premiership: 8th
- Scottish League Cup: Second round
- Scottish Cup: Fifth round
- Top goalscorer: League: Joel Nouble (7); All: Joel Nouble (7)
- Highest home attendance: 9,672 vs. Rangers, Premiership, 30 July 2022
- Lowest home attendance: 712 vs. Kelty Hearts, League Cup, 23 July 2022
- Average home league attendance: 3,987
Home colours	Away colours

The 2022–23 season was Livingston's fifth consecutive season in the Scottish Premiership, the top flight of Scottish football. Livingston also competed in the League Cup and the Scottish Cup.

== Season summary ==
In the season-opening League Cup group stage, Livingston picked up wins against Cove Rangers, Albion Rovers and Kelty Hearts, but were beaten 1-2 at home by Inverness. They finished as runners-up in their group behind Inverness, but still qualified for the knockout round by virtue of being one of the three best second-placed teams. The Lions were knocked out in the Second Round in a 1-2 home defeat by Dundee United.

On 22 July Livingston signed Shamal George for an undisclosed fee, and he was introduced to fans ahead of their League Cup match against Kelty Hearts the same day. George signed a four-year deal and it was reported they paid the second largest transfer fee in the club’s history to sign the goalkeeper from Colchester United for £87,500.

Livi enjoyed a strong first half of the season, heading into the World Cup break in fourth place in the Scottish Premiership.

In the Scottish Cup, Livi came from behind to defeat Stenhousemuir in the Fourth Round, before losing at home for the second time this season - on this occasion 0-3 - to Championship side Inverness.

Despite the strong start in the league Livingston collapsed after the winter break, missing out on the top six and eventually finishing eighth in the Premiership.

== Results & fixtures ==
Win Draw Loss Postponed

=== Pre-season ===
2 July 2022	Livingston	0–3	Greenock Morton	Almondvale Stadium
15:00		Report	Obileye 5' (o.g.); Garrity 85', 90'

5 July 2022	Livingston	6–0	Linlithgow Rose	Almondvale Stadium
19:45	Mullin 6', 32', 70'; Montaño 34', 48'; Gonçalves 51'	Report

=== Scottish Premiership ===
30 July 2022 1	Livingston	1–2	Rangers	Almondvale Stadium
12:00	Nouble 5'	Report	Arfield 72'; Tavernier 74'	Attendance: 9,672; Referee: Don Robertson

7 August 2022 2	Dundee United	0–1	Livingston	Tannadice Park
15:00		Report	Montaño 49'	Attendance: 7,442; Referee: Steven McLean

13 August 2022 3	Livingston	2–1	Hibernian	Almondvale Stadium
12:00	Nouble 6'; Obileye 86'	Report	Kenneh 51'	Attendance: 3,854; Referee: Craig Napier

20 August 2022 4	Motherwell	1–0	Livingston	Fir Park
15:00	van Veen 68' (pen.)	Report	Bahamboula (red card) 77'	Attendance: 5,158; Referee: Nick Walsh

27 August 2022 5	Aberdeen	5–0	Livingston	Pittodrie Stadium
15:00	Miovski 41' (pen.), 63'; McCrorie 58'; Besuijen 62' (pen.); Duncan 87'	Report	Fitzwater (red card) 40'	Attendance: 13,739; Referee: Colin Steven

3 September 2022 6	Livingston	1–0	Heart of Midlothian	Almondvale Stadium
15:00	Montaño 28'	Report		Attendance: 4,678; Referee: William Collum

17 September 2022 7	Livingston	1–0	Kilmarnock	Almondvale Stadium
15:00	Montaño 25'	Report		Attendance: 2,253; Referee: Grant Irvine

1 October 2022 8	St Mirren	2–1	Livingston	St Mirren Park
15:00 BST	Baccus 69'; Ayunga (red card) 76'; Greive 90'	Report	Anderson 86'	Attendance: 5,366; Referee: Craig Napier

8 October 2022 9	Livingston	0–1	Ross County	Almondvale Stadium
15:00		Report	Edwards 73'	Attendance: 3,696; Referee: Graham Grainger

15 October 2022 10	Livingston	1–0	St Johnstone	Almondvale Stadium
15:00	Bahamboula 35'	Report		Attendance: 1,554; Referee: Kevin Clancy

22 October 2022 11	Rangers	1–1	Livingston	Ibrox Stadium
15:00 BST	Lundstram 90+1'	Report	Nouble 4'; Boyes (red card) 78'	Attendance: 48,855; Referee: David Munro

30 October 2022 12	Livingston	0–3	Celtic	Almondvale Stadium
12:00		Report	Furuhashi 9'; Taylor 53'; Jota 87'	Attendance: 8,825; Referee: William Collum

4 November 2022 13	Kilmarnock	2–3	Livingston	Rugby Park
19:45 BST	Wright 4', 45+2'	Report	Anderson 39'; Kelly 61' (pen.); Stokes 75' (o.g.)	Attendance: 5,239; Referee: Colin Steven

8 November 2022 14	Livingston	2–1	Aberdeen	Almondvale Stadium
19:45	Fitzwater 6'; Kelly 17' (pen.)	Report	Duk 58' (pen.)	Attendance: 2,598; Referee: Nick Walsh

12 November 2022 15	Heart of Midlothian	1–1	Livingston	Tynecastle Park
15:00 BST	Rowles (red card) 75'; Ginnelly 90+7'	Report	Kelly 55'	Attendance: 18,448; Referee: Craig Napier

21 December 2022 16	Celtic	2–1	Livingston	Celtic Park
19:45 BST	Obileye 23' (o.g.); Furuhashi 45'	Report	Devlin 45+2'	Attendance: 58,499; Referee: Euan Anderson

24 December 2022 17	Hibernian	4–0	Livingston	Easter Road
14:00 BST	Nisbet 33'; Cadden 35'; Magennis 40', 50'	Report	Holt (red card) 15'	Attendance: 15,260; Referee: Craig Napier

28 December 2022 18	Livingston	1–1	St Mirren	Almondvale Stadium
19:45	Pittman (red card) 24'; Montaño 56'	Report	O'Hara (red card) 55'; Main 63'	Attendance: 1,897; Referee: Steven McLean

2 January 2023 19	Livingston	1–1	Motherwell	Almondvale Stadium
15:00	Boyes 39'	Report	van Veen 42'	Attendance: 2,163; Referee: David Munro

7 January 2023 20	Ross County	0–2	Livingston	Victoria Park
15:00 BST		Report	Anderson 67', 70'	Attendance: 3,083; Referee: William Collum

14 January 2023 21	St Johnstone	2–4	Livingston	McDiarmid Park
15:00 BST	Murphy 65'; McLennan 67'	Report	Kelly 8', 15'; Penrice 39', 81'	Attendance: 2,899; Referee: John Beaton

29 January 2023 22	Livingston	0–0	Heart of Midlothian	Almondvale Stadium
13:30		Report		Attendance: 6,393; Referee: Alan Muir

1 February 2023 23	Celtic	3–0	Livingston	Celtic Park
19:45 BST	Taylor 29'; Maeda 33'; Furuhashi 45+2'	Report		Attendance: 58,295; Referee: Nick Walsh

4 February 2023 24	Livingston	3–1	Kilmarnock	Almondvale Stadium
15:00	Nouble 10'; Anderson 12'; Kelly 29'	Report	Doidge 47'	Attendance: 1,923; Referee: Colin Steven

18 February 2023 25	Livingston	0–3	Rangers	Almondvale Stadium
15:00	Oméonga (red card) 77'	Report	Tavernier 24' (pen.), 78'; Roofe 85'	Attendance: 8,752; Referee: David Dickinson

25 February 2023 26	Aberdeen	1–0	Livingston	Pittodrie Stadium
15:00 BST	Miovski 44'	Report		Attendance: 14,091; Referee: David Munro

4 March 2023 27	Livingston	1–4	Hibernian	Almondvale Stadium
15:00	Nouble 9'; Fitzwater (red card) 52'	Report	Youan 28', 37'; Oméonga 61' (o.g.); Kukharevych 90+7'	Attendance: 5,531; Referee: Chris Graham

8 March 2023 28	Livingston	1–1	Dundee United	Almondvale Stadium
19:45	Bradley 13'	Report	Behich 59'	Attendance: 2,115; Referee: Matthew MacDermid

18 March 2023 29	Livingston	2–1	Ross County	Almondvale Stadium
15:00	Nouble 37'; Devlin 38'	Report	Murray 69'	Attendance: 1,283; Referee: William Collum

1 April 2023 30	St Mirren	3–0	Livingston	St Mirren Park
15:00 BST	O'Hara 5' (pen.), 42' (pen.); Watt 18'	Report		Attendance: 5,984; Referee: John Beaton

8 April 2023 31	Motherwell	3–0	Livingston	Fir Park
15:00 BST	van Veen 9', 33'; Johnston 34'	Report		Attendance: 4,566; Referee: Grant Irvine

15 April 2023 32	Livingston	2–0	St Johnstone	Almondvale Stadium
15:00	Nouble 23'; Kelly 38'	Report		Attendance: 3,976; Referee: David Munro

22 April 2023 33	Dundee United	2–0	Livingston	Tannadice Park
15:00 BST	McGrath 17'; Fletcher 85'	Report		Attendance: 8,034; Referee: Kevin Clancy

6 May 2023 34	Ross County	2–0	Livingston	Victoria Park
15:00 BST	Iacovitti 40'; Samuel 60'	Report	Guthrie (red card) 81'	Attendance: 3,129; Referee: David Dickinson

13 May 2023 35	Kilmarnock	2–0	Livingston	Rugby Park
15:00 BST	Vassell 48'; Armstrong 64' (pen.)	Report		Attendance: 5,051; Referee: David Munro

20 May 2023 36	Livingston	2–1	Dundee United	Almondvale Stadium
15:00	Anderson 11'; Penrice 59'	Report	Harkes 21'; Behich (red card) 90+4'	Attendance: 2,612; Referee: Don Robertson

24 May 2023 37	Livingston	1–1	Motherwell	Almondvale Stadium
19:45	George (red card) 43'; Shinnie 83'	Report	van Veen 3'	Attendance: 1,983; Referee: Chris Graham

28 May 2023 38	St Johnstone	2–0	Livingston	McDiarmid Park
15:00 BST	Wright 17'; Kane 68' (pen.)	Report		Attendance: 4,362; Referee: Graham Grainger

=== Scottish League Cup ===
==== Group stage ====
9 July 2022 Group Stage	Albion Rovers	2–3	Livingston	Cliftonhill
15:00	Sonkur 62'; Paton 71'	Report	Pittman 5'; Mullin 20'; Anderson 48'	Attendance: 468; Referee: Don Robertson

12 July 2022 Group Stage	Livingston	1–2	Inverness CT	Almondvale Stadium
19:45	Stryjek (red card) 59'; Holt 84'	Report	Samuels 37'; MacKay 67'	Attendance: 944; Referee: Alan Muir

16 July 2022 Group Stage	Cove Rangers	1–2	Livingston	Balmoral Stadium
15:00	Vigurs 45+1'	Report	Gonçalves (red card) 25'; Shinnie 48'; Devlin 88'	Attendance: 797; Referee: Willie Collum

23 July 2022 Group Stage	Livingston	2–0	Kelty Hearts	Almondvale Stadium
15:00	Kelly 11'; Cancar 77'	Report		Attendance: 712; Referee: Grant Irvine

==== Knockout round ====
31 August 2022 Second round	Livingston	1–2	Dundee United	Livingston
19:45	Guthrie 78'	Report	Fletcher 15'; Harkes 34'	Stadium: Almondvale Stadium; Attendance: 1,497; Referee: David Munro

=== Scottish Cup ===
21 January 2023 Fourth round	Stenhousemuir	1–3	Livingston	Stenhousemuir
15:00	Jamieson 26'	Report	Pittman 52'; Bradley 55', 59'	Stadium: Ochilview Park; Attendance: 916; Referee: Euan Anderson

11 February 2023 Fifth round	Livingston	0–3	Inverness CT	Livingston
15:00		Report	McKay 51', 80'; Welsh 62'	Stadium: Almondvale Stadium; Attendance: 1,284; Referee: Don Robertson

== Squad statistics ==
=== Appearances ===
As of 28 May 2023

No.	Pos	Nat	Player	Total		Premiership		League Cup		Scottish Cup	
No.	Pos	Nat	Player	Apps	Goals	Apps	Goals	Apps	Goals	Apps	Goals
1	GK	(England) ENG	Shamal George	35	0	32	0	1	0	2	0
2	DF	(Scotland) SCO	Nicky Devlin (c)	44	3	37	2	5	1	2	0
4	DF	(England) ENG	Tom Parkes	4	0	2+2	0	0	0	0	0
5	DF	(England) ENG	Jack Fitzwater	34	0	26+2	0	4	0	2	0
6	DF	(England) ENG	Ayo Obileye	29	2	22+2	2	3	0	1+1	0
7	MF	(Republic of the Congo) CGO	Dylan Bahamboula	27	1	9+11	1	3+2	0	0+2	0
8	MF	(Scotland) SCO	Scott Pittman	39	2	27+5	0	5	1	2	1
9	FW	(Scotland) SCO	Bruce Anderson	36	6	21+9	5	1+3	1	2	0
11	MF	(Colombia) COL	Cristian Montaño	36	4	25+6	4	3+1	0	0+1	0
12	DF	(Scotland) SCO	Jamie Brandon	9	0	1+7	0	0+1	0	0	0
15	DF	(Wales) WAL	Morgan Boyes	23	1	15+7	1	0	0	1	0
16	MF	(Scotland) SCO	Steven Bradley	18	3	12+4	1	0	0	2	2
17	MF	(Scotland) SCO	Stephen Kelly	33	5	24+7	5	0	0	2	0
18	MF	(Scotland) SCO	Jason Holt	40	0	26+7	0	3+2	0	2	0
19	FW	(England) ENG	Joel Nouble	36	7	29+1	7	5	0	1	0
22	MF	(Scotland) SCO	Andrew Shinnie	40	2	21+12	1	4+1	1	1+1	0
23	DF	(Dominican Republic) DOM	Luiyi de Lucas	10	0	8+2	0	0	0	0	0
24	DF	(Scotland) SCO	Sean Kelly	33	2	28+1	2	4	0	0	0
28	FW	(England) ENG	Kurtis Guthrie	18	1	6+9	0	0+1	1	0+2	0
29	MF	(Scotland) SCO	James Penrice	33	3	16+13	3	2	0	2	0
32	GK	(Scotland) SCO	Jack Hamilton	3	0	2+1	0	0	0	0	0
33	MF	(Belgium) BEL	Stéphane Oméonga	31	0	15+13	0	1+2	0	0	0
Players who left the club during the season
3	DF	(Scotland) SCO	Jackson Longridge	11	0	3+6	0	0+1	0	0+1	0
10	FW	(Guinea-Bissau) GBS	Esmaël Gonçalves	13	0	1+8	0	4	0	0	0
14	MF	(Scotland) SCO	Josh Mullin	3	1	0+1	0	1+1	1	0	0
20	MF	(Republic of the Congo) CGO	Scott Bitsindou	4	0	0+1	0	1+2	0	0	0
25	DF	(Australia) AUS	Phillip Cancar	5	1	1+2	0	1+1	1	0	0
28	FW	(Scotland) SCO	Jack Hamilton	0	0	0	0	0	0	0	0
30	GK	(United States) USA	Brian Schwake	0	0	0	0	0	0	0	0
31	GK	(Russia) RUS	Ivan Konovalov	8	0	4	0	3+1	0	0	0
32	GK	(Poland) POL	Max Stryjek	1	0	0	0	1	0	0	0
38	MF	(England) ENG	Harrison Clark	0	0	0	0	0	0	0	0
40	FW	(Republic of Ireland) IRL	Jaze Kabia	0	0	0	0	0	0	0	0

== Team statistics ==
=== League table ===
Pos	Team	Pld	W	D	L	GF	GA	GD	Pts	Qualification or relegation (Note: Teams play each other three times (33 matches), before the league is split into two groups (the top six and the bottom six).)
6	St Mirren	38	12	10	16	43	61	−18	46	
7	Motherwell	38	14	8	16	53	51	+2	50	
8	Livingston	38	13	7	18	36	60	−24	46	
9	St Johnstone	38	12	7	19	41	59	−18	43	
10	Kilmarnock	38	11	7	20	37	62	−25	40	

Rules for classification: 1) Points; 2) Goal difference; 3) Goals scored; 4) Head-to-Head points; 5) Head-to-Head goal difference; 6) Play-off (only if deciding champion, UEFA competitions qualification, second stage group allocation or relegation).

=== League Cup table ===
Pos	Team	Pld	W	PW	PL	L	GF	GA	GD	Pts	Qualification	ICT	LIV	COV	ALB	KEL
1	Inverness Caledonian Thistle	4	3	1	0	0	8	2	+6	11	Qualification for the second round	—	—	p1–1	4–0	—
2	Livingston	4	3	0	0	1	8	5	+3	9	Qualification for the second round	1–2	—	—	—	2–0
3	Cove Rangers	4	1	0	1	2	6	7	−1	4		—	1–2	—	—	2–3
4	Albion Rovers	4	1	0	0	3	5	9	−4	3		—	2–3	1–2	—	—
5	Kelty Hearts	4	1	0	0	3	3	7	−4	3		0–1	—	—	0–2	—

Rules for classification: 1) goal difference, 2) goals scored, 3) away goals scored, 4) matches won, 5) away matches won, 6) drawing of lots.

== Transfers ==
=== Players in ===
Player	From	Fee
(Republic of the Congo) Scott Bitsindou	(Belgium) Lierse	Free
(Scotland) Jamie Brandon	(Scotland) Heart of Midlothian	Free
(Australia) Phillip Cancar	(Australia) Western Sydney Wanderers	Free
(Guinea-Bissau) Esmaël Gonçalves	(Bangladesh) Sheikh Russel	Free
(Republic of the Congo) Dylan Bahamboula	(England) Oldham Athletic	Free
(England) Shamal George	(England) Colchester United	Undisclosed
(Scotland) Jack Hamilton	(Scotland) Greenock Morton	Free
(England) Kurtis Guthrie	(India) RoundGlass Punjab	Free
(Scotland) Stephen Kelly	(Scotland) Rangers	Undisclosed
(Scotland) Steven Bradley	(Scotland) Hibernian	Undisclosed
(Dominican Republic) Luiyi de Lucas	(Finland) FC Haka	Free

=== Players out ===
Player	To	Fee
(England) Marvin Bartley	Retired	
(Scotland) Gary Maley	Retired	
(South Africa) Keaghan Jacobs	(Scotland) Arbroath	Free
(Scotland) Jack McMillan	(Scotland) Partick Thistle	Free
(Scotland) Carlo Pignatiello	(Scotland) Greenock Morton	Free
(Slovenia) Matej Poplatnik	(Slovenia) ND Ilirija	Free
(Scotland) Gavin Reilly	(Scotland) Queen of the South	Free
(Scotland) Craig Sibbald	(Scotland) Dundee United	Free
(Scotland) Alan Forrest	(Scotland) Heart of Midlothian	Free
(Poland) Max Stryjek	(England) Wycombe Wanderers	Undisclosed
(England) Harrison Clark	(England) Gateshead	Free
(Scotland) Josh Mullin	(Scotland) Ayr United	Free
(Australia) Phillip Cancar	(Australia) Newcastle Jets	Free
(Russia) Ivan Konovalov	(Kazakhstan) FC Tobol	Free

=== Loans in ===
Player	From	Fee

=== Loans out ===
Player	To	Fee
(United States) Brian Schwake	(Scotland) Greenock Morton	Loan
(Republic of Ireland) Jaze Kabia	(Scotland) Greenock Morton	Loan
(Scotland) Jack Hamilton	(England) Hartlepool United	Loan
(England) Harrison Clark	(Scotland) Stirling Albion	Loan
(Scotland) Josh Mullin	(Scotland) Ayr United	Loan
(Republic of the Congo) Scott Bitsindou	(Scotland) Arbroath	Loan
(Republic of Ireland) Jaze Kabia	(Scotland) Queen of the South	Loan
(Guinea-Bissau) Esmaël Gonçalves	(Scotland) Raith Rovers	Loan
(Scotland) Jackson Longridge	(Scotland) Cove Rangers	Loan

== See also ==
List of Livingston F.C. seasons
