= List of Queen of the South F.C. seasons =

This is a summary of every season that Queen of the South have competed in Scottish and European football since the club first entered the Scottish Football League in 1923–24. The Doonhamers were involved in regional football between their formation in March 1919 and entering the Scottish Football League in August 1923. The list below details the club's achievements in all major competitions and also their all-time league record.

== Statistics ==
Last updated 21 November 2026

League Season	Season-By-Season League Record									Scottish Cup	League Cup	Challenge Cup	Europe	
League Season	Division	P	W	D	L	F	A	Pts	Pos	Scottish Cup	League Cup	Challenge Cup	Europe	
1923–24	3	30	14	10	6	64	31	38	3rd		(Note: The League Cup competition did not start until the 1946–47 season.)	(Note: The Challenge Cup competition did not start until the 1990–91 season.)	(Note: European club competitions did not begin until the 1955–56 season.)	
1924–25	3	30	17	6	7	67	32	40	2nd		(Note: The League Cup competition did not start until the 1946–47 season.)	(Note: The Challenge Cup competition did not start until the 1990–91 season.)	(Note: European club competitions did not begin until the 1955–56 season.)	
1925–26	2	38	10	8	20	64	88	28	17th		(Note: The League Cup competition did not start until the 1946–47 season.)	(Note: The Challenge Cup competition did not start until the 1990–91 season.)	(Note: European club competitions did not begin until the 1955–56 season.)	
1926–27	2	38	16	4	18	72	80	36	11th		(Note: The League Cup competition did not start until the 1946–47 season.)	(Note: The Challenge Cup competition did not start until the 1990–91 season.)	(Note: European club competitions did not begin until the 1955–56 season.)	
1927–28	2	38	15	6	17	92	106	36	12th		(Note: The League Cup competition did not start until the 1946–47 season.)	(Note: The Challenge Cup competition did not start until the 1990–91 season.)	(Note: European club competitions did not begin until the 1955–56 season.)	
1928–29	2	36	16	4	16	86	79	36	9th		(Note: The League Cup competition did not start until the 1946–47 season.)	(Note: The Challenge Cup competition did not start until the 1990–91 season.)	(Note: European club competitions did not begin until the 1955–56 season.)	
1929–30	2	38	18	6	14	65	63	42	7th		(Note: The League Cup competition did not start until the 1946–47 season.)	(Note: The Challenge Cup competition did not start until the 1990–91 season.)	(Note: European club competitions did not begin until the 1955–56 season.)	
1930–31	2	38	18	6	14	83	66	42	6th		(Note: The League Cup competition did not start until the 1946–47 season.)	(Note: The Challenge Cup competition did not start until the 1990–91 season.)	(Note: European club competitions did not begin until the 1955–56 season.)	
1931–32	2	38	18	5	15	99	91	41	9th		(Note: The League Cup competition did not start until the 1946–47 season.)	(Note: The Challenge Cup competition did not start until the 1990–91 season.)	(Note: European club competitions did not begin until the 1955–56 season.)	
1932–33	2	34	20	9	5	93	59	49	2nd		(Note: The League Cup competition did not start until the 1946–47 season.)	(Note: The Challenge Cup competition did not start until the 1990–91 season.)	(Note: European club competitions did not begin until the 1955–56 season.)	
1933–34	1	38	21	3	14	75	78	45	4th		(Note: The League Cup competition did not start until the 1946–47 season.)	(Note: The Challenge Cup competition did not start until the 1990–91 season.)	(Note: European club competitions did not begin until the 1955–56 season.)	
1934–35	1	38	11	7	20	52	72	29	17th		(Note: The League Cup competition did not start until the 1946–47 season.)	(Note: The Challenge Cup competition did not start until the 1990–91 season.)	(Note: European club competitions did not begin until the 1955–56 season.)	
1935–36	1	38	11	9	18	54	72	31	15th	R3	(Note: The League Cup competition did not start until the 1946–47 season.)	(Note: The Challenge Cup competition did not start until the 1990–91 season.)	(Note: European club competitions did not begin until the 1955–56 season.)	
1936–37	1	38	8	8	22	49	95	24	18th		(Note: The League Cup competition did not start until the 1946–47 season.)	(Note: The Challenge Cup competition did not start until the 1990–91 season.)	(Note: European club competitions did not begin until the 1955–56 season.)	
1937–38	1	38	11	11	16	58	71	33	16th		(Note: The League Cup competition did not start until the 1946–47 season.)	(Note: The Challenge Cup competition did not start until the 1990–91 season.)	(Note: European club competitions did not begin until the 1955–56 season.)	
1938–39	1	38	17	9	12	69	64	43	6th	Quarters	(Note: The League Cup competition did not start until the 1946–47 season.)	(Note: The Challenge Cup competition did not start until the 1990–91 season.)	(Note: European club competitions did not begin until the 1955–56 season.)	
1939–40	Competitive football was cancelled due to the Second World War.										(Note: The League Cup competition did not start until the 1946–47 season.)	(Note: The Challenge Cup competition did not start until the 1990–91 season.)	(Note: European club competitions did not begin until the 1955–56 season.)	
1940–41	Competitive football was cancelled due to the Second World War.										(Note: The League Cup competition did not start until the 1946–47 season.)	(Note: The Challenge Cup competition did not start until the 1990–91 season.)	(Note: European club competitions did not begin until the 1955–56 season.)	
1941–42	Competitive football was cancelled due to the Second World War.										(Note: The League Cup competition did not start until the 1946–47 season.)	(Note: The Challenge Cup competition did not start until the 1990–91 season.)	(Note: European club competitions did not begin until the 1955–56 season.)	
1942–43	Competitive football was cancelled due to the Second World War.										(Note: The League Cup competition did not start until the 1946–47 season.)	(Note: The Challenge Cup competition did not start until the 1990–91 season.)	(Note: European club competitions did not begin until the 1955–56 season.)	
1943–44	Competitive football was cancelled due to the Second World War.										(Note: The League Cup competition did not start until the 1946–47 season.)	(Note: The Challenge Cup competition did not start until the 1990–91 season.)	(Note: European club competitions did not begin until the 1955–56 season.)	
1944–45	Competitive football was cancelled due to the Second World War.										(Note: The League Cup competition did not start until the 1946–47 season.)	(Note: The Challenge Cup competition did not start until the 1990–91 season.)	(Note: European club competitions did not begin until the 1955–56 season.)	
1945–46	Competitive football was cancelled due to the Second World War.										(Note: The League Cup competition did not start until the 1946–47 season.)	(Note: The Challenge Cup competition did not start until the 1990–91 season.)	(Note: European club competitions did not begin until the 1955–56 season.)	
1946–47	A	30	9	8	13	44	69	26	12th	R1	Group	(Note: The Challenge Cup competition did not start until the 1990–91 season.)	(Note: European club competitions did not begin until the 1955–56 season.)	
1947–48	A	30	10	5	15	49	74	25	13th	R3	Group	(Note: The Challenge Cup competition did not start until the 1990–91 season.)	(Note: European club competitions did not begin until the 1955–56 season.)	
1948–49	A	30	11	8	11	47	53	30	10th	R2	Group	(Note: The Challenge Cup competition did not start until the 1990–91 season.)	(Note: European club competitions did not begin until the 1955–56 season.)	
1949–50	A	30	5	6	19	31	63	16	15th	Semis	Group	(Note: The Challenge Cup competition did not start until the 1990–91 season.)	(Note: European club competitions did not begin until the 1955–56 season.)	
1950–51	B	30	21	3	6	69	35	45	1st	R1	Semis	(Note: The Challenge Cup competition did not start until the 1990–91 season.)	(Note: European club competitions did not begin until the 1955–56 season.)	
1951–52	A	30	10	8	12	50	60	28	10th	R3	Group	(Note: The Challenge Cup competition did not start until the 1990–91 season.)	(Note: European club competitions did not begin until the 1955–56 season.)	
1952–53	A	30	10	8	12	43	61	28	10th	Quarters	Group	(Note: The Challenge Cup competition did not start until the 1990–91 season.)	(Note: European club competitions did not begin until the 1955–56 season.)	
1953–54	A	30	14	4	12	72	53	32	10th	R3	Group	(Note: The Challenge Cup competition did not start until the 1990–91 season.)	(Note: European club competitions did not begin until the 1955–56 season.)	
1954–55	A	30	9	6	15	38	56	24	13th	R5	Group	(Note: The Challenge Cup competition did not start until the 1990–91 season.)	(Note: European club competitions did not begin until the 1955–56 season.)	
1955–56	A	34	16	5	13	69	73	37	6th	Quarters	Group	(Note: The Challenge Cup competition did not start until the 1990–91 season.)	DNQ	
1956–57	1	34	10	5	19	54	96	25	16th	R5	Group	(Note: The Challenge Cup competition did not start until the 1990–91 season.)	DNQ	
1957–58	1	34	12	5	17	61	72	29	15th	Quarters	Group	(Note: The Challenge Cup competition did not start until the 1990–91 season.)	DNQ	
1958–59	1	34	6	6	22	38	101	18	18th	R1	Group	(Note: The Challenge Cup competition did not start until the 1990–91 season.)	DNQ	
1959–60	2	36	21	7	8	94	52	49	3rd	R3	Group	(Note: The Challenge Cup competition did not start until the 1990–91 season.)	DNQ	
1960–61	2	36	20	3	13	77	52	43	5th	R2	Semis	(Note: The Challenge Cup competition did not start until the 1990–91 season.)	DNQ	
1961–62	2	36	24	5	7	78	33	53	2nd	R2	Group	(Note: The Challenge Cup competition did not start until the 1990–91 season.)	DNQ	
1962–63	1	34	10	6	18	36	75	26	15th	Quarters	Quarters	(Note: The Challenge Cup competition did not start until the 1990–91 season.)	DNQ	
1963–64	1	34	5	6	23	40	92	16	17th	R2	Group	(Note: The Challenge Cup competition did not start until the 1990–91 season.)	DNQ	
1964–65	2	36	16	13	7	84	50	45	3rd	R1	Group	(Note: The Challenge Cup competition did not start until the 1990–91 season.)	DNQ	
1965–66	2	36	18	11	7	83	53	47	3rd	R2	Group	(Note: The Challenge Cup competition did not start until the 1990–91 season.)	DNQ	
1966–67	2	38	15	9	14	84	76	39	9th	R1	Group	(Note: The Challenge Cup competition did not start until the 1990–91 season.)	DNQ	
1967–68	2	36	16	6	14	73	57	38	6th	R2	Group	(Note: The Challenge Cup competition did not start until the 1990–91 season.)	DNQ	
1968–69	2	36	20	7	9	75	41	47	5th	R1	Group	(Note: The Challenge Cup competition did not start until the 1990–91 season.)	DNQ	
1969–70	2	36	22	6	8	72	49	50	3rd	R1	Group	(Note: The Challenge Cup competition did not start until the 1990–91 season.)	DNQ	
1970–71	2	36	13	9	14	50	56	35	11th	R3	Group	(Note: The Challenge Cup competition did not start until the 1990–91 season.)	DNQ	
1971–72	2	36	17	9	10	56	38	43	7th	R3	Group	(Note: The Challenge Cup competition did not start until the 1990–91 season.)	DNQ	
1972–73	2	36	13	8	15	45	52	34	11th	R3	Group	(Note: The Challenge Cup competition did not start until the 1990–91 season.)	DNQ	
1973–74	2	36	20	7	9	73	41	47	4th	R4	Group	(Note: The Challenge Cup competition did not start until the 1990–91 season.)	DNQ	
1974–75	2	38	23	7	8	77	33	53	2nd	R4	Group	(Note: The Challenge Cup competition did not start until the 1990–91 season.)	DNQ	
1975–76	First	26	9	6	11	41	47	24	10th	Quarters	Quarters	(Note: The Challenge Cup competition did not start until the 1990–91 season.)	DNQ	
1976–77	First	39	11	13	15	58	65	35	9th	Quarters	Group	(Note: The Challenge Cup competition did not start until the 1990–91 season.)	DNQ	
1977–78	First	39	8	13	18	44	68	29	12th	R4	Quarters	(Note: The Challenge Cup competition did not start until the 1990–91 season.)	DNQ	
1978–79	First	39	8	8	23	43	93	24	14th	R3	R1	(Note: The Challenge Cup competition did not start until the 1990–91 season.)	DNQ	
1979–80	Second	39	11	9	19	51	69	31	13th	R4	R2	(Note: The Challenge Cup competition did not start until the 1990–91 season.)	DNQ	
1980–81	Second	39	16	14	9	66	53	46	2nd	R2	R2	(Note: The Challenge Cup competition did not start until the 1990–91 season.)	DNQ	
1981–82	First	39	4	10	25	44	93	18	14th	R3	Group	(Note: The Challenge Cup competition did not start until the 1990–91 season.)	DNQ	
1982–83	Second	39	17	7	15	75	56	42	7th	R3	Group	(Note: The Challenge Cup competition did not start until the 1990–91 season.)	DNQ	
1983–84	Second	39	16	10	13	51	46	42	6th	R2	R2	(Note: The Challenge Cup competition did not start until the 1990–91 season.)	DNQ	
1984–85	Second	39	10	14	15	42	56	34	8th	R4	R2	(Note: The Challenge Cup competition did not start until the 1990–91 season.)	DNQ	
1985–86	Second	39	23	9	7	71	36	55	2nd	R1	R2	(Note: The Challenge Cup competition did not start until the 1990–91 season.)	DNQ	
1986–87	First	44	11	12	21	50	71	34	10th	R3	R2	(Note: The Challenge Cup competition did not start until the 1990–91 season.)	DNQ	
1987–88	First	44	14	15	15	56	67	43	7th	R3	R3	(Note: The Challenge Cup competition did not start until the 1990–91 season.)	DNQ	
1988–89	First	39	2	8	29	38	99	10	14th	R4	R2	(Note: The Challenge Cup competition did not start until the 1990–91 season.)	DNQ	
1989–90	Second	39	11	14	14	58	69	36	10th	R4	R3	(Note: The Challenge Cup competition did not start until the 1990–91 season.)	DNQ	
1990–91	Second	39	9	12	18	46	62	30	12th	R2	Quarters	R1	DNQ	
1991–92	Second	39	14	5	20	71	86	33	11th	R2	R1	Semis	DNQ	
1992–93	Second	39	12	9	18	57	72	33	10th	R2	R2	Quarters	DNQ	
1993–94	Second	39	17	9	13	69	48	43	5th	R1	R1	R2	DNQ	
1994–95	Second	36	11	11	14	46	51	44	7th	R2	R2	R1	DNQ	
1995–96	Second	36	11	10	15	54	67	43	7th	R2	R2	R1	DNQ	
1996–97	Second	36	13	8	15	55	57	47	5th	R3	R1	R2	DNQ	
1997–98	Second	36	15	9	12	57	51	54	4th	R3	R2	Runners-Up	DNQ	
1998–99	Second	36	13	9	14	50	45	48	4th	R2	R1	(Note: The Challenge Cup competition was not held in the 1998–99 season.)	DNQ	
1999–2000	Second	36	8	9	19	45	75	33	9th	R3	R2	R1	DNQ	
2000–01	Second	36	13	7	16	52	59	46	6th	R3	R2	R1	DNQ	
2001–02	Second	36	20	7	9	64	42	67	1st	R2	R2	R1	DNQ	
2002–03	First	36	12	12	12	45	48	48	5th	R3	R2	Winners	DNQ	
2003–04	First	36	15	9	12	46	48	54	5th	R4	R3	R1	DNQ	
2004–05	First	36	14	9	13	36	38	51	4th	R4	R1	R2	DNQ	
2005–06	First	36	7	12	17	31	54	33	8th	R3	R1	R2	DNQ	
2006–07	First	36	10	11	15	34	54	41	8th	Quarters	R2	R2	DNQ	
2007–08	First	36	14	10	12	47	43	52	4th	Runners-Up	R1	R1	DNQ	
2008–09	First	36	12	11	13	57	50	47	5th	R4	R3	Quarters	UC	QR2
2009–10	First	36	15	11	10	53	40	56	4th	R3	R3	Quarters	DNQ	
2010–11	First	36	14	7	15	54	53	49	4th	R4	R3	Runners-Up	DNQ	
2011–12	First	36	7	11	18	38	64	32	10th	R5	R3	R1	DNQ	
2012–13	Second	36	29	5	2	92	23	92	1st	R4	R3	Winners	DNQ	
2013–14	Championship	36	16	7	13	53	39	55	4th	R4	R3	Quarters	DNQ	
2014–15	Championship	36	17	9	10	58	41	60	4th	Quarters	R2	R1	DNQ	
2015–16	Championship	36	12	6	18	46	56	42	7th	R4	R2	R2	DNQ	
2016–17	Championship	36	11	10	15	46	52	43	6th	R3	Quarters	Semis	DNQ	
2017–18	Championship	36	14	10	12	59	53	52	6th	R4	R1	Quarters	DNQ	
2018–19	Championship	36	9	11	16	41	48	38	9th	R5	R2	R3	DNQ	
2019–20	Championship	28	7	7	14	28	40	28	9th	R3	R1	R3	DNQ	
2020–21	Championship	27	9	5	13	38	51	32	6th	R3	R1	(Note: The Challenge Cup competition was not held in the 2020–21 season.)	DNQ	
2021–22	Championship	36	8	9	19	36	54	33	10th	R3	R1	Runners-Up	DNQ	
2022-23	League One	36	16	6	14	59	59	54	5th	R3	R2	Semis	DNQ	
2023-24	League One	36	11	8	17	46	53	41	7th	R4	R1	R4	DNQ	
2024-25	League One	36	16	7	13	46	41	55	3rd	R4	R1	R3	DNQ	
2025-26	League One	36	14	12	10	58	47	54	3rd	R3	R1	R3	DNQ	
2026-27	League One	16	4	1	11	15	43	13	10th	R?	R1	R3	DNQ	

All-Time League Record
Period	Played	Won	Drawn	Lost	GF	GA	GD	Points
1923–2026	3457	1297	790	1370	5520	5758	-238	3800

== Key ==
- P = Played
- W = Games won
- D = Games drawn
- L = Games lost
- F = Goals for
- A = Goals against
- Pts = Points
- Pos = Final position
- 1 = Division One (1st tier)
- 2 = Division Two (2nd tier)
- 3 = Division Three (3rd tier)
- A = Division A (1st tier)
- B = Division B (2nd tier)
- First = First Division (2nd tier)
- Second = Second Division (3rd tier)
- Championship = Scottish Championship (2nd tier)
- UC = UEFA Europa League
- QR2 = Qualifying Round 2
- DNE = Did not enter
- DNQ = Did not qualify
- R1 = Round 1
- R2 = Round 2
- R3 = Round 3
- R4 = Round 4
- R5 = Round 5
- Group = Group Stages
- Quarter = Quarter-finals
- Semi = Semi-finals
- Finalists = Runners-Up

=== Colour coding ===
Champions or Winners	Finalists	Semi	Promoted	Relegated
