= Kurtis Guthrie =

English footballer (born 1993)

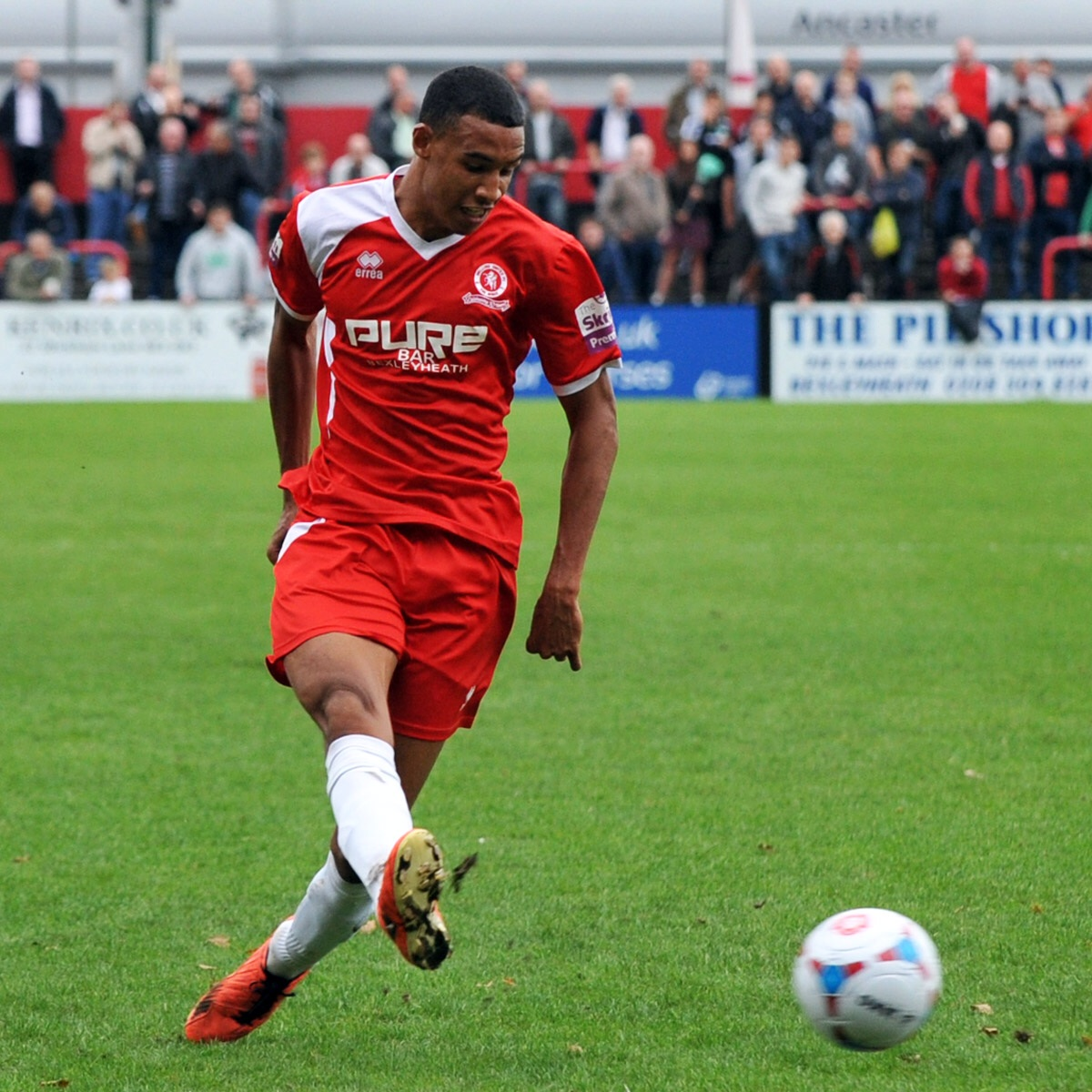
- Guthrie with Welling United in November 2013

Personal information
- Full name: Kurtis Owen Guthrie
- Date of birth: 21 April 1993 (age 33)
- Place of birth: Peterborough, England
- Height: 1.91 m (6 ft 3 in)
- Position: Striker

Team information
- Current team: Queen of the South

Youth career
- 2001–2009: St. Clement

Senior career*
Years	Team	Apps	(Gls)
2009–2010	St. Clement		
2010–2011	Trinity		
2011–2012	Accrington Stanley	13	(0)
2011–2012	→ Southport (loan)	5	(1)
2012	Bath City	10	(5)
2012–2014	Welling United	54	(8)
2014–2016	Forest Green Rovers	79	(19)
2016–2018	Colchester United	45	(13)
2018–2020	Stevenage	58	(16)
2020–2021	Bradford City	10	(0)
2021	Port Vale	17	(1)
2021–2022	RoundGlass Punjab	18	(13)
2022–2024	Livingston	42	(1)
2024	Churchill Brothers	4	(0)
2025	Jersey Bulls	6	(2)
2025–	Queen of the South	28	(7)

International career
2011	Jersey	2	(0)
2016	England C	1	(1)
- * Club domestic league appearances and goals as of 23:59, 10 April 2026 (UTC)

Kurtis Owen Guthrie (born 21 April 1993) is an English professional footballer who plays as a forward for Scottish League One club Queen of the South. He won a bronze medal for Jersey at the 2011 Island Games. He later represented England C, scoring on his debut in March 2016. His sister, Serena, represented England at netball.

After beginning his career on the island of Jersey for St. Clement and Trinity, Guthrie moved to England to sign for Accrington Stanley in 2011, making his professional debut the same year. He spent time on loan at Southport and signed with Welling United in 2012, following a short spell at Bath City. He helped Welling to win the Conference South title in 2012–13 and was sold to Forest Green Rovers in May 2014. He played in the 2016 National League play-off final. Though Forest Green lost the match, he returned to the English Football League after being signed by Colchester United. He scored 13 goals in two seasons at Colchester. He joined Stevenage in July 2018 and became the club's top scorer during the 2018–19 season. He joined Bradford City in January 2020. He found first-team opportunities limited and moved on to Port Vale on a short-term contract 12 months later. He joined the Indian I-League club RoundGlass Punjab in September 2021 before moving to Scottish side Livingston in August 2022. He returned to the IPL with Churchill Brothers in September 2024 and signed with Jersey Bulls on his native island in February 2025. He signed with Scottish club Queen of the South in June 2025.

== Club career ==
=== Early career ===
Born in Peterborough, Guthrie grew up on the island of Jersey and began playing local football with St. Clement Sports Club from the age of eight. He broke into the first-team in 2009, before transferring to Trinity in 2011. He was beginning an electrician's apprenticeship before his professional football career took off.

=== Accrington Stanley ===
After one season with Trinity, Accrington Stanley took Guthrie on a two-week trial, scoring against Premier League side Blackburn Rovers in his first pre-season friendly appearance for the club. He signed a one-year contract with the League Two side with the option of a further year on 19 July 2011. He made his professional debut on the opening day of the 2011–12 season in a 0–0 away draw at Northampton Town on 6 August. In November 2011, Accrington manager John Coleman sent Guthrie out on loan to Conference Premier side Southport until January 2012 to get more match experience. He scored his first goal in senior football on 3 December, as Southport recorded a 2–1 win over Alfreton Town at Haig Avenue. He made five appearances for Southport, scoring one goal before returning to Accrington. Guthrie played 16 games for Accrington in the 2011–12 season. He was released by recently appointed manager Paul Cook in May 2012. Speaking in February 2017, Guthrie said that his career ultimately benefited from leaving the Crown Ground as "I started from scratch all over again [in non-League] and rebuilt myself".

=== Bath City ===
Guthrie signed a short-term deal with Conference South side Bath City on 16 August 2012. He made his club debut on 18 August as a substitute in their 1–1 away draw against Welling United, before scoring a hat-trick on his home debut at Twerton Park three days later in a 3–1 win over Maidenhead United. Guthrie made 13 appearances in all competitions, scoring six goals before leaving the club after his short-term deal expired in October 2012.

=== Welling United ===
Having previously been on trial with the club in the summer of 2012 following his release from Accrington, Welling United signed Guthrie after he left Bath City. He scored his first goals for Welling on 13 April 2013, an 18-minute hat-trick against Weston-super-Mare at Park View Road. He went on to tally eight goals in two seasons, amassing 61 appearances and helping the club to the Conference South title in his first season.

"I think that spirit is what won us promotion. In terms of individual players, we probably didn't have the best team in the division, but we had the best collective team unit. We knew one another's strengths and weaknesses, and how best to work together."

— Guthrie speaking in a 2015 interview.

=== Forest Green Rovers ===
Forest Green Rovers signed Guthrie for an undisclosed fee from Welling in May 2014. He signed a two-year deal with Welling's Conference Premier rivals, moving from part-time back to full-time professional football. Manager Adrian Pennock had previously managed at Welling, as did Jamie Day, who would join the club as assistant manager in May 2015. He made his debut at The New Lawn as a substitute in a 2–1 win against Chester on 12 August. His first start came on 11 October as he played the full 90-minutes for Forest Green in a 1–1 draw with Gateshead. He ended a 15-game scoring drought to score his first goal for the club in a 3–3 away draw against Torquay United on 15 November, before scoring his second of the match and the final goal of the game. He helped his side reach the Conference play-offs for the first time at the end of the 2014–15 season, appearing in the semi-final matches against Bristol Rovers where Forest Green bowed out 3–0 on aggregate. He had scored eight goals in 42 appearances in his first season for Forest Green.

Guthrie scored 12 goals and provided seven assists in 46 appearances in his second season with the club as they reached the 2016 National League play-off final at Wembley Stadium on 15 May 2016. He played for 77-minutes of the final and provided the assist for Keanu Marsh-Brown's goal, though Forest Green lost 3–1 to Grimsby Town. Rovers exercised an option to extend his contract into a third season, but accepted a transfer offer after the club's valuation was met.

=== Colchester United ===
Guthrie made a return to the English Football League in July 2016 when Colchester United signed him for an undisclosed fee. He agreed a two-year contract on 5 July and his signing was announced by Colchester on 6 July. Manager John McGreal signed him as a support striker, though would soon see him as a "true No 9" as Guthrie developed at the club. He made his debut for the club on 6 August in Colchester's 1–1 draw with Hartlepool United at Victoria Park on the opening day of the 2016–17 season. He scored his first goal on 16 August in Colchester's 3–2 win over Grimsby Town at the Colchester Community Stadium. Guthrie scored his first professional hat-trick on 7 January in Colchester's 4–1 win at home to Carlisle United, and was subsequently named in the EFL 'Team of the Week'. He was nominated for the 'PFA Fans' Player of the Month' award for January but finished third behind John Marquis of Doncaster Rovers and Exeter City's David Wheeler. He was ruled out for the remainder of the season in March 2017 after requiring surgery for an ankle injury picked up during Colchester's home game against Hartlepool United, having scored 12 goals in 36 games for the U's.

Guthrie made a return to first-team action on 30 September 2017 as an injury-time substitute for Brandon Hanlan in Colchester's 1–0 win at Yeovil Town. Following another injury lay-off, Guthrie made his first league start of the 2017–18 season on 6 January, scoring Colchester's goal in their 4–1 defeat by Cheltenham Town. Ruled out with an ankle injury that required surgery and with his contract expiring at the end of the season, his deal with Colchester was terminated by mutual consent on 29 March 2018. His last appearance came in a 1–0 defeat at home to Yeovil Town on 17 March, a game in which he had an on-field confrontation with Sammie Szmodics over taking a penalty kick for the U's.

=== Stevenage ===
Guthrie joined League Two club Stevenage on 26 July 2018. He scored his first goals for Stevenage when he scored a hat-trick in an EFL Trophy tie against Swansea City Under 21s on 28 August. His first league goal for "Boro" came on 6 October, in a 3–1 win over former club Colchester at Broadhall Way; jeered from the start by supporters of his former club, he said that "it fuels me. I love it". On 17 November, he was sent off for an "ugly challenge" on Adam Thompson in a 4–0 defeat at Bury. He received another red card on 1 January, after fouling Fraser Franks during a 1–0 win over Newport County. He was nominated for the EFL League Two Player of the Month for April, whilst Dino Maamria was also nominated for Manager of the Month, after Guthrie scored seven goals and provided three assists in a run of four wins and a draw in five matches. He ended the 2018–19 campaign with 14 goals in 38 appearances, making him the club's top-scorer.

Speaking in a post-match interview after scoring twice in a 3–2 defeat to Carlisle United on 14 September 2019, Guthrie backed caretaker manager Mark Sampson to get the job permanently. However, the job instead went to Graham Westley, who dropped Guthrie from the first-team.

=== Bradford City ===
Guthrie joined Bradford City for an undisclosed fee on 31 January 2020. He was signed by Gary Bowyer, who left the club before Guthrie had the chance to make his "Bantams" debut. He made "one unconvincing start" against former club Stevenage and one substitute appearance for new manager Stuart McCall, before the COVID-19 pandemic in England brought the 2019–20 season to a premature conclusion. He was linked with a move away from Valley Parade in the summer but worked hard to convince McCall to give him another chance. However, he failed to score in eleven matches in the first half of the 2020–21 season, featuring just twice after Mark Trueman and Conor Sellars took interim charge in December, and left the club in January 2021 after his contract was cancelled by mutual consent.

=== Port Vale ===
On 15 January 2021, Guthrie joined Port Vale on a contract until the end of the 2020–21 season. Guthrie said that he had felt unwanted at Bradford and that he would fit well in the game plans of Port Vale's caretaker manager Danny Pugh. New manager Darrell Clarke continued to name him in matchday squads despite a 40-game goal drought that was ended in the final stages of a 2–0 win at Harrogate Town on 5 April. This was his only goal in 17 games for the "Valiants", and he was one of 15 players released in May 2021.

=== RoundGlass Punjab ===
Guthrie was linked with Grimsby Town in the summer of 2021. However, he did not feature in any pre-season friendlies. He was instead announced as a new signing at I-League club RoundGlass Punjab on 2 September 2021. He scored on his debut on a 2–0 Boxing Day victory against Rajasthan United. He scored two goals on his debut at the Guru Nanak Stadium, in a 2–2 draw with Churchill Brothers on 4 March 2022. He scored 13 goals in 18 games during the 2021–22 season, and said that the experience of playing in India reinvigorated him after he had considered retirement before making the move.

=== Livingston ===
On 29 August 2022, Guthrie signed for Livingston on a two-year deal, with the club retaining the option of a third year, after impressing manager David Martindale on a week long trial. He scored on his debut two days later, in a 2–1 defeat to Dundee United in a Scottish League Cup game at Almondvale Stadium. He was sent off after the video assistant referee spotted him elbowing Keith Watson during a 2–0 defeat at Ross County on 6 May. He was released upon Livi being relegated at the end of the 2023–24 season.

=== Churchill Brothers ===
On 7 September 2024, Guthrie returned to the I-League by signing with Churchill Brothers.

=== Jersey Bulls ===
On 7 February 2025, Guthrie returned to Jersey to sign for Jersey Bulls of the Combined Counties League Premier Division South. He scored two goals on his home debut at Springfield Stadium in a 6–1 victory over Horley Town.

=== Queen of the South ===
On 19 June 2025, Gurthrie joined Scottish League One club Queen of the South, where manager Peter Murphy said he "gives us a different dynamic in the forward areas". He scored 12 goals in 37 games across the 2025–26 campaign.

== International career ==
Guthrie featured twice for Jersey at the 2011 Island Games, where his side earned a bronze medal. He was called up to an England C training camp for the first time in September 2015. On 22 March 2016, he made his England C debut in an away international against Ukraine. He started the match and scored the opening goal in a 2–0 victory.

== Style of play ==
A 6 ft 3 in (1.91 m) forward, he describes himself as an all-round player who prefers to play in the middle but can also play out wide.

== Personal life ==
Guthrie's older sister, Serena, is a member of the 2018 Commonwealth Games gold medal-winning England netball team. Serena also featured in the 2014 Commonwealth Games and won a bronze medal at the 2011 World Netball Championships in Singapore. His wife is Scottish.

== Career statistics ==
As of match played 5 May 2026

Club	Season	League			National cup (Note: Includes FA Cup, AIFF Super Cup, Scottish Cup)		League cup (Note: Includes Football League Cup, Scottish League Cup)		Other		Total	
Club	Season	Division	Apps	Goals	Apps	Goals	Apps	Goals	Apps	Goals	Apps	Goals
Accrington Stanley	2011–12	League Two	13	0	0	0	1	0	2 (Note: Appearances in Football League Trophy)	0	16	0
Southport (loan)	2011–12	Conference Premier	5	1	—		—		1 (Note: Appearance(s) in FA Trophy)	0	6	1
Bath City	2012–13	Conference South	10	5	3	1	—		—		13	6
Welling United	2012–13	Conference South	23	4	—		—		4	0	27	4
Welling United	2013–14	Conference Premier	31	4	3	0	—		0	0	34	4
Welling United	Total		54	8	3	0	—		4	0	61	8
Forest Green Rovers	2014–15	Conference Premier	39	8	1	0	—		5 (Note: 3 appearances in FA Trophy and 2 appearances in National League play-offs)	0	45	8
Forest Green Rovers	2015–16	National League	40	11	3	1	—		3 (Note: Appearances in play-offs)	0	46	12
Forest Green Rovers	Total		79	19	4	1	—		8	0	91	20
Colchester United	2016–17	League Two	33	12	1	0	1	0	1 (Note: Appearance in EFL Trophy)	0	36	12
Colchester United	2017–18	League Two	12	1	0	0	0	0	1	0	13	1
Colchester United	Total		45	13	1	0	1	0	2	0	49	13
Stevenage	2018–19	League Two	34	11	1	0	1	0	2	3	38	14
Stevenage	2019–20	League Two	24	5	1	0	1	0	2	0	28	5
Stevenage	Total		58	16	2	0	2	0	4	3	66	19
Bradford City	2019–20	League Two	2	0	0	0	0	0	0	0	2	0
Bradford City	2020–21	League Two	8	0	0	0	2	0	1	0	11	0
Bradford City	Total		10	0	0	0	2	0	1	0	13	0
Port Vale	2020–21	League Two	17	1	0	0	0	0	0	0	17	1
RoundGlass Punjab	2021–22	I-League	18	13	—		—		—		18	13
RoundGlass Punjab	2022–23	I-League	0	0	—		—		—		0	0
RoundGlass Punjab	Total		18	13	0	0	0	0	0	0	18	13
Livingston	2022–23	Scottish Premiership	16	0	2	0	1	1	—		19	1
Livingston	2023–24	Scottish Premiership	26	1	2	0	5	0	—		33	1
Livingston	Total		42	1	4	0	6	1	0	0	52	2
Churchill Brothers	2024–25	I-League	4	0	—		—		—		4	0
Jersey Bulls	2024–25	Combined Counties League; Premier Division South	6	2	—		—		1 (Note: Appearances in Combined Counties League play-offs)	0	7	2
Queen of the South	2025–26	Scottish League One	28	7	1	0	3	1	6 (Note: 5 appearances in Scottish Challenge Cup and 1 appearance in play-offs)	4	38	12
Queen of the South	2026–27	Scottish League One	0	0	0	0	0	0	0	0	0	0
Queen of the South	Total		28	7	1	0	3	1	6	4	38	12
Career total			389	86	18	2	15	2	29	7	451	97

== Honours ==
Jersey

- Island Games bronze medal: 2011

Welling United

- Conference South: 2012–13
