= Daniel McManus =

Scottish footballer

Personal information
- Date of birth: 9 July 2003 (age 23)
- Position: Midfielder

Team information
- Current team: Stranraer
- Number: 17

Youth career
- 2012–2021: St Mirren

Senior career*
Years	Team	Apps	(Gls)
2021–2022	St Mirren	1	(0)
2021–2022	East Kilbride (loan)	35	(7)
2022–2023	East Kilbride	9	(2)
2023–2025	St Cadoc's Y.C.		
2025–	Stranraer	32	(1)
- * Club domestic league appearances and goals as of 4 May 2026

Daniel McManus (born 9 July 2003) is a Scottish professional footballer who plays as a midfielder for Stranraer.

On 22 December 2021, McManus was temporarily recalled from his loan spell and made his debut for St Mirren as an 88th minute substitute in a 0–0 draw with Celtic. He was later quoted as saying it was "surreal going from watching them on TV to playing against them." McManus returned for the rest of the season on loan to East Kilbride. On 1 July 2022, he signed a permanent deal with East Kilbride. In 2023, he joined St Cadoc's and was named Young Player of the Year for the 2023–24 Season. In July 2025, he signed for Stranraer.
