= Freddie O'Donoghue =

Manx professional footballer

Personal information
- Full name: Freddie James O'Donoghue
- Date of birth: 3 February 2007 (age 19)
- Position: Forward

Team information
- Current team: Carlisle United

Youth career
- Peel
- 2023–2026: Carlisle United

Senior career*
Years	Team	Apps	(Gls)
2023	Peel	2	(1)
2024–2026	Carlisle United	1	(0)
2025	→ Carlisle City (loan)	5	(0)
2025–2026	→ Queen of the South (loan)	13	(0)
- * Club domestic league appearances and goals as of 13:19, 28 December 2025 (UTC)

Freddie James O'Donoghue (born 3 February 2007) is a Manx professional footballer who plays as a forward for National League club Carlisle United.

== Career ==
O'Donoghue began his career with Peel in his native Isle of Man where he made five appearances for their first team. In March 2023, it was announced he would be joining League Two club Carlisle United on a two-year scholarship deal.

Prior to the commencement of the 2024–25 season, O'Donoghue appeared in a number of pre-season friendlies, impressing manager Paul Simpson confirming that he would remain training with the first-team. On 3 September 2024, he made his senior debut as a half-time substitute in a 2–1 EFL Trophy defeat to Nottingham Forest U21.

In August 2025, O'Donoghue signed a first professional contract, before joining Scottish League One club Queen of the South on loan until January 2026.

== Career statistics ==
As of match played 14 September 2024

Appearances and goals by club, season and competition
Club	Season	League			National cup (Note: Includes FA Cup, Isle of Man FA Cup)		League Cup		Other		Total	
Club	Season	Division	Apps	Goals	Apps	Goals	Apps	Goals	Apps	Goals	Apps	Goals
Peel	2022–23	Premier League	2	1	3	1	—		—		5	2
Carlisle United	2024–25	League Two	1	0	0	0	0	0	1 (Note: Appearance(s) in EFL Trophy)	0	2	0
Carlisle City (loan)	2024–25	Northern League Division One	5	0	—		—		—		5	0
Career total			8	1	3	1	0	0	1	0	12	2
