= Michael Hewitt =

Scottish footballer

Personal information
- Full name: Michael Joseph Hewitt
- Date of birth: 23 October 2000 (age 26)
- Place of birth: Irvine, Scotland
- Height: 6 ft 2 in (1.88 m)
- Position: Defender

Team information
- Current team: Portadown

Youth career
- –2017: Rangers

Senior career*
Years	Team	Apps	(Gls)
2017–2018	Rangers	0	(0)
2017	→ Edusport Academy (loan)		
2018–2023	Ayr United	19	(0)
2019	→ Kilwinning Rangers (loan)		
2020	→ Annan Athletic (loan)	5	(0)
2022–2023	→ Peterhead (loan)	11	(1)
2023–2024	Hamilton Academical	17	(1)
2024–2026	Queen of the South	51	(7)
2026–	Portadown	6	(0)
- * Club domestic league appearances and goals as of 13 September 2026

Michael Joseph Hewitt (born 23 October 2000) is a Scottish professional footballer who plays as a defender for NIFL Premiership club Portadown.

== Career ==
Born in Irvine, Hewitt started his career at Bellfield Royals 2000s and won the Glasgow League in an unbeaten side, then signed for Rangers. Hewitt played youth football with Rangers and had a loan spell with Edusport Academy in 2017, with 37 appearances in the Scottish Lowland League.

Hewitt signed a two-year contract with Ayr United in the 2019 close season. Hewitt then had a spell at Kilwinning Rangers in the first half of the 2019–20 season, with 22 appearances before joining Annan Athletic on loan in January 2020. Hewitt appeared in 5 league matches for the Galabankies before the league was cut short due to the corona pandemic.

Hewitt's first-team debut for Ayr United was on 6 October 2020 in a 5–2 Scottish League Cup victory away to Albion Rovers, before making his league debut for the club away to Inverness Caledonian Thistle in the Scottish Championship on 24 October 2020. Hewitt made 8 appearances for the Honest Men in the 2020–21 season.

Hewitt was then loaned to Peterhead in September 2022.

On 4 August 2023, Hewitt joined Scottish League One club Hamilton Academical on a permanent deal.

On 9 July 2024, it was announced that Hewitt signed a one-year deal with Queen of the South.
