= Reece Lyon =

Scottish footballer

Personal information
- Date of birth: 13 March 2000 (age 26)
- Place of birth: Greenock, Scotland
- Height: 1.83 m (6 ft 0 in)
- Position: Midfielder

Team information
- Current team: Ayr United
- Number: 6

Youth career
- St Mirren
- 2013–2018: Greenock Morton

Senior career*
Years	Team	Apps	(Gls)
2018–2023	Greenock Morton	88	(6)
2022–2023	→ Annan Athletic (loan)	31	(1)
2023–2024	Kelty Hearts	34	(5)
2024–2026	Queen of the South	68	(13)
2026–	Ayr United	20	(0)
- * Club domestic league appearances and goals as of 14 August 2026

Reece Lyon (born 13 March 2000) is a Scottish footballer who plays for Championship side Ayr United. Lyon has had spells with Greenock Morton, Annan Athletic (loan), Kelty Hearts and Queen of the South.

== Club career ==
Lyon came through the Greenock Morton youth academy after signing from St Mirren in 2013. He made his debut in the Scottish Challenge Cup against Dumbarton in August 2018. Lyon scored on his first start for the club: scoring the winning goal against Queen of the South.

Lyon was loaned to Annan Athletic in September 2022.

On 28 June 2023, Kelty Hearts announced Lyon had signed for the club.

== Career statistics ==
As of matches played 4 May 2024

Appearances and goals by club, season and competition
Club	Season	League			Scottish Cup		League Cup		Other		Total	
Club	Season	Division	Apps	Goals	Apps	Goals	Apps	Goals	Apps	Goals	Apps	Goals
Greenock Morton	2018–19	Scottish Championship	19	2	0	0	0	0	1 (Note: Appearances in the Scottish Challenge Cup)	0	20	2
Greenock Morton	2019–20	Scottish Championship	18	4	3	1	5	0	1	0	27	5
Greenock Morton	2020–21	Scottish Championship	19	0	3	0	2	0	3 (Note: Three goals in the Scottish League Two Play-Offs)	0	27	0
Greenock Morton	2021-22	Scottish Championship	30	0	3	0	2	0	3	0	38	0
Greenock Morton	2022-23	Scottish Championship	2	0	-		4	0	0	0	6	0
Greenock Morton	Total		88	6	9	1	13	0	8	0	118	7
Annan (loan)	2022-23	Scottish League Two	31	1	0	0	-		5 (Note: One appearance in the Scottish Challenge Cup and four in the Scottish League Two Play-Offs)	0	36	1
Kelty Hearts	2023-24	Scottish League One	34	5	2	1	3	0	2	2	41	8
Career total			153	12	11	2	16	0	15	2	195	16

== Honours ==
- SPFL Development League West: Winners (2) 2015-16, 2017-18
