= Nicky Jamieson =

Scottish footballer

Personal information
- Date of birth: 3 August 1996 (age 30)
- Place of birth: Glasgow, Scotland
- Height: 6 ft 3 in (1.90 m)
- Position: Defender

Team information
- Current team: Stenhousemuir
- Number: 5

Youth career
- 2012–2014: Greenock Morton

Senior career*
Years	Team	Apps	(Gls)
2014–2019	Largs Thistle	155	(14)
2019–2020	Queen's Park	27	(0)
2020–2021	Alloa Athletic	16	(0)
2021–	Stenhousemuir	143	(11)
- * Club domestic league appearances and goals as of 4 May 2026

Nicky Jamieson (born 3 August 1996) is a Scottish professional footballer who plays as a defender for Scottish Championship club Stenhousemuir. He spent five years at Largs Thistle, before playing for Queen's Park and Alloa Athletic for one season each.

== Club career ==
=== Largs Thistle ===
Jamieson spent the first five years of his career at Largs Thistle after leaving the Greenock Morton youth academy. During his five years at the club Jamieson made over one hundred and fifty appearances for the Junior side.

=== Queen's Park ===
In June 2019 Jamieson completed a move to Scottish League Two side Queen's Park, in his only year with 'The Spiders' he made the league's Team of the Season.

=== Alloa Athletic ===
On 22 July 2020 Jamieson signed for Scottish Championship outfit Alloa Athletic ahead of the 2020–21 season.

=== Stenhousemuir ===
At the start of season 2021-22 Jamieson signed a loan deal from Alloa Athletic In January 2022, Jamieson signed a permanent contract until summer 2023. In February 2022, he picked up cinch League 2 Player of the Month. At the conclusion of season 2021-22, Jamieson was named as Stenhousemuir Player of the Year.

At the conclusion of season 2022-23, Jamieson was named as Stenhousemuir Player of the Year.

In January 2024, Jamieson extended his contract at Stenhousemuir until Summer 2026.

Following Stenhousemuir becoming cinch Scottish League 2 Champions, in April 2024, Jamieson was named in League 2 Team of The Year.

At the conclusion of season 2023-24, Jamieson was named as the supporters Player of the Year and was also named as the Player's Player of the Year.

Due to injury , in season 2024-25, Jamieson made only 3 Scottish League Cup appearances.

In season 2025-26, Jamieson returned to the team , but injury limited him to 6 appearances and he dropped out of the team before making his return in November 2025 v Dumbarton in the Scottish League Challenge Cup.

In April 2026, Jamieson extended his contract with Stenhousemuir for another year. The following month, Stenhousemuir defeated Alloa Athletic in League One Play off to secure their status in the Championship for the first time in their history.

== Career statistics ==
As of Matches played to May 2026

Appearances and goals by club, season and competition
Club	Season	League			National Cup		League Cup		Other		Total	
Club	Season	Division	Apps	Goals	Apps	Goals	Apps	Goals	Apps	Goals	Apps	Goals
Queen's Park	2019–20	Scottish League One	22	0	2	0	3	0	0	0	27	0
Alloa	2020–21	Scottish Championship	12	0	1	0	3	0	0	0	16	0
Stenhousemuir	2021–22	Scottish League Two	32	2	2	0	3	0	2 (Note: Appearances in Scottish League Challenge Cup)	1	39	3
Stenhousemuir	2022-23	Scottish League Two	30	2	2	1	3	0	1	0	36	3
Stenhousemuir	2023- 24	Scottish League Two	26	2	0	0	4	0	0	0	30	2
Stenhousemuir	2024-25	Scottish League One	0	0	0	0	3	0	0	0	3	0
Stenhousemuir	2025-26	Scottish League One	23	2	3	0	0	0	6	1	32	3
Stenhousemuir	Stenhousemuir Total		111	8	10	1	13	0	9	2	143	11
Career total			145	8	10	1	19	0	9	2	186	11
