= Stenhousemuir F.C. =

Association football club in Stenhousemuir, Scotland

Stenhousemuir
- Full name: Stenhousemuir Football Club
- Nicknames: Stenny; The Warriors
- Founded: 1884; 142 years ago
- Ground: Ochilview Park
- Capacity: 3,746 (626 seated)
- Chairman: Dan Wharton
- Manager: Marvin Bartley
- League: Scottish Championship
- 2025–26: Scottish League One, 2nd of 10 (promoted)
- Website: www.stenhousemuirfc.com
Home colours	Away colours

Stenhousemuir Football Club is a Scottish football club located in Stenhousemuir, Falkirk. They are a member of the Scottish Professional Football League and currently play in the Scottish Championship.

Through much of its history, the team has competed in the lower leagues of Scottish football.

In September 2009, Stenhousemuir Football Club, Ltd. was re-registered as a Community Interest Company.

== History ==
=== 1884–1989 ===
The club claim to have been founded in 1884 following a breakaway from a local team called Heather Rangers. However this cannot be substantiated through contemporary accounts, for instance it appears Heather Rangers did not exist until much later. There was a Stenhousemuir FC in existence between 1881 and 1885 with the current club not being reported in the press until 1886.

Stenhousemuir Thistle Cricket Club was in existence c.1881. A reference to a "2nd Stenhousemuir (Windsor)", i.e. a reserve XI, match is made on 18 May 1882. A "Stenhousemuir (Larbert)" away match to Alloa Athletic is listed on 9 September 1882, with Vale of Bannock v Stenhousemuir Thistle on 16 September 1882.

The team line ups for these two matches (one week apart) support Stenhousemuir and Stenhousemuir Thistle as being separate clubs. Stenhousemuir were admitted to the SFA on 21 August 1883 before being struck off from the SFA on 16 August 1885 for non-payment of subscription. This club played in the Scottish Cup in 1883–84 and 1884–85. There is further reference to a Stenhousemuir "junior" team on 13 March 1884. The club were likely not formed as a breakaway from Heather Rangers as they did not exist in 1884 but more likely c.1890.

In 1890, the Warriors moved to Ochilview Park following spells at Tryst Park and Goschen Park. In the early 20th century the club had a brief spell of success, winning the Scottish Qualifying Cup twice in 1901 and 1902. In 1902–03, the club reached the Scottish Cup semi-final, losing 1–4 at home to Rangers. The 1921–22 season saw Stenhousemuir compete for the first time in senior Scottish League Football.

In 1925–26, Stenhousemuir goalkeeper Joe Shortt was offered a £50 bribe to throw a match against Broxburn United, but he rejected the offer and the Warriors won the match 6–2. A bookmaker from the Bainsford district of Falkirk, was subsequently jailed for attempted match fixing.

In 1928, the wooden grandstand at Ochilview Park burnt down in a fire, which led to a new stand being built in its place, although staircases reputedly had to be added later due to planning errors. The 1936–37 season saw the club register a record victory – a 9–2 home win against Dundee United. More than a decade later in 1949–50, a Scottish Cup quarter-final tie against East Fife drew a record crowd of 12,525 – the highest ever at Ochilview Park. On 7 November 1951, the first floodlit game between two Scottish senior teams occurred at Ochilview Park, a friendly match between Stenhousemuir and Hibernian. The floodlights had been paid for three years earlier by Tommy Douglas, a butcher in King Street, Stenhousemuir.

In the middle of 1964, Rangers revealed a plan to The Scottish Football League to remove the Warriors from the league, along with four other clubs, on the basis that they were poorest-supported clubs over the previous three seasons. Stenhousemuir, along with Albion Rovers, Berwick Rangers, Brechin City and Stranraer, with support from a number of clubs, including Celtic, Hamilton Academical and Airdrieonians, defeated the plan.

In 1972–73, the Warriors defeated Rangers 2–1 at Ibrox Stadium in Second Round 2nd leg of the Scottish League Cup. Notably, Rangers were the holders of the UEFA Cup Winners' Cup at the time. Rangers progressed 6–2 on aggregate having previously won the 1st leg 5–0 at Ochilview.

=== 1990–present ===
In 1992–93, the Club allowed their rivals Stirling Albion to groundshare at Ochilview Park. In the 1993–94 season, the Warriors were moved out of the bottom league for the first time, due to the formation of the Scottish Third Division. The mid-1990s would go on to be one of the club's most successful periods in its history.

In 1994–95 they defeated St Johnstone 4–0 and Aberdeen 2–0, both higher league opposition, en route to the Scottish Cup quarter finals. In the 1995–96 season, Stenhousemuir won the Scottish Challenge Cup, defeating Dundee United 5–4 on penalties after a goalless 90 minutes and extra time. In the process they reached their first national semi-final since season 1902–03.

In 1997–98, Stenhousemuir were relegated from the Scottish Second Division to the Scottish Third Division for the first time in the history of the club. However, the next season (1998–99) the Warriors won promotion back to the Second Division, also for the first time in the history of the club.

In 2006–07, the Club installed a new synthetic surface at Ochilview Park. It became the first in the UK to pass the FIFA 2 Star category accreditation. A new synthetic surface was installed in the summer of 2014.

At the end of the 2008–09 season, Stenhousemuir were promoted back to the Scottish Second Division (having been relegated from there in season 2002–03) after defeating Cowdenbeath 5–4 on penalties, this after drawing 0–0 on aggregate in the play-off final.

The 2010–11 season saw the Club narrowly avoid another relegation after spending most of the season in the bottom two positions. On the final day of the season the club defeated Peterhead 3–0 to move above Alloa Athletic and therefore avoided the relegation play-offs.

In 2013 Stenhousemuir reached their second Challenge Cup Semi-Final by beating Dundee on penalties after drawing 1–1 but went on to lose 1–0 to Rangers.

In January 2014, after parting company with Martyn Corrigan, the Warriors appointed Scott Booth as their new manager. Booth was relieved of his duties on 1 February 2015 after winning just 12 from 42 games and failing to record any back to back victories.

Assistant manager Brown Ferguson took temporary charge for the second time, and the club announced on 2 April 2015 that 'Bomber' Brown would take over as manager on a full-time basis for the 2015–16 season.

After a poor season in 2016–17, the club found itself relegated to Scottish League Two. However, the club came straight back up the following season despite finishing in fourth spot, winning promotion through the play-offs after beating Queen's Park in the play-off semi-finals and then Peterhead in the final. 2018–19 saw the club relegated back to League Two after defeat to Annan Athletic in the play-offs.

After five seasons in Scottish League Two Stenhousemuir won the first league championship in their 140 year history, winning the title on 6 April 2024 after a 0–0 draw with East Fife.

In 2025–26, Stenhousemuir, then in Scottish League One, won promotion to the Scottish Championship through the play-offs. After beating Queen of the South in the semi-finals, they defeated fellow League One side Alloa Athletic 3–2 on aggregate in the final, winning the first leg 3–1 away before losing the second leg 1–0 at Ochilview Park on 16 May 2026. Manager Gary Naysmith, who had announced during the play-offs that he would leave for Ayr United, oversaw the promotion.

== Supporters and rivalries ==
Stenhousemuir Supporters' Trust is the official supporters' club of Stenhousemuir FC.

The club also draws much international support: the Norwegian Supporters' Club is a small supporters' organisation based in Oslo, Norway. The Supporters Club was founded on New Year's Eve 1992 by Rolf Erik Wulff, Christian Wulff and Kjell Jarslett. In 1996 it was given one share of Stenhousemuir F.C. as a recognition of their support and promotion of the club. The fan club has approximately 30 members.

Stenhousemuir Supporters Trust, also known as The 'Warriors Supports Trust', is registered with the Financial Services Agency as a not-for-profit Industrial and Provident Society. It was established in 2003. It works with the Board of the football club and the Supporters Club to develop a more successful football club. The current chairman of the Stenhousemuir Supporters Trust is Graeme Wallace, who is also the stadium announcer at Ochilview.

Notable fans include The Wire actor Isiah Whitlock and Monty Python star Michael Palin.

The biggest rivals are East Stirlingshire with whom they share a fierce local rivalry, as they are both from the Falkirk area and have frequently played in the same division as well as sharing the same stadium for a period. There is a smaller rivalry with Falkirk.

== Current squad and staff ==
=== First-team squad ===
As of 1 October 2026

Note: Flags indicate national team as defined under FIFA eligibility rules; some limited exceptions apply. Players may hold more than one non-FIFA nationality.

No.	Pos.	Nation	Player
1	GK	SCO	Darren Jamieson
2	DF	SCO	Ross Meechan (captain)
4	DF	SCO	Gregor Buchanan
5	DF	SCO	Sam Young
7	MF	SCO	Euan O'Reilly
8	MF	SCO	Finn Robson
10	MF	SCO	Andrew Shinnie
11	MF	SCO	Lewis O'Donnell
14	DF	SCO	Kinlay Bilham
15	FW	SCO	Dale Carrick
17	MF	SCO	Michael Anderson
19	DF	SCO	Scott Bright

No.	Pos.	Nation	Player
20	MF	SCO	Gus Stevenson (co-operation loan with Hearts)
21	MF	SCO	Lewis Hodgkiss (on loan from St Mirren)
24	DF	SCO	Leyton Grant
25	FW	ENG	Hamzad Kargbo
26	DF	SCO	Nicky Jamieson
28	DF	SCO	Callum Penman (on loan from St Mirren)
29	MF	SCO	Miller Thomson (on loan from Dundee United)
34	GK	SCO	Robbie Hemfrey
36	FW	WAL	Louis Lloyd (on loan from St Johnstone)
37	DF	SCO	Oscar MacIntyre
39	DF	SCO	Matthew Gillies (co-operation loan with Hearts)

=== On loan ===
Note: Flags indicate national team as defined under FIFA eligibility rules; some limited exceptions apply. Players may hold more than one non-FIFA nationality.

No.	Pos.	Nation	Player
3	DF	SCO	Oliver Simpson (on loan at East Stirlingshire)
6	DF	SCO	Archie Graham (on loan at Peterhead)

No.	Pos.	Nation	Player
9	FW	SCO	Matthew Aitken (on loan at Alloa Athletic)
33	GK	SCO	Curtis Lyle (on loan at Stirling Albion)

=== Club staff ===
Position	Staff
Manager	Marvin Bartley
Assistant manager	Neil Hastings
First team coach	Gregor Buchanan
Goalkeeping coach	Myles Hogarth
Director of football	Martin Christie
Video analyst	Euan Blondin
Sport scientist	Paul Green
Head of physiotherapy	Kirsty Hughes
Physio	Luke Bolton
Club doctor	Dr Aileen Cope

== Board of directors ==
Position	Name
Chairman	Dan Wharton
Director	James Alexander
Director	Gary Russell
Director	Gordon Thompson
Supporters club representative	Andy McPhate

== Achievements ==
- Scottish League One (third tier):
  - Promoted: 2025–26 (via play-offs)
- Scottish Third Division/Scottish League Two (fourth tier):
  - Winners: 2023–24
  - Runners-up: 1998–99
  - Promoted: 2008–09, 2017–18 (via play-offs)
- Scottish Challenge Cup:
  - Winners: 1995–96
- Scottish Qualifying Cup:
  - Winners (2): 1900–01, 1901–02
- Stirlingshire Cup:
  - Winners (11): 1899–1900, 1901–02, 1921–22, 1932–33, 1936–37, 1962–63, 1970–71, 1975–76, 1986–87, 2001–02, 2014–15
- Central Combination:
  - Winners (3): 1898–99, 1900–01, 1901–02
- Midland League:
  - Winners: 1895–96

== Records ==
- Biggest league victory: 9–2 v Dundee United, 16 April 1937. (Scottish League – Division Two)
- Biggest league defeat: 2–11 v Dunfermline Athletic, 27 September 1930. (Scottish League – Division Two)
- Biggest home attendance: 12,525 v East Fife, 11 March 1950. (Scottish Cup Quarter-Final)
