= 2023–24 Livingston F.C. season =

Livingston
2023–24 season
- Chairman: John Ward
- Manager: David Martindale
- Stadium: Almondvale Stadium
- Scottish Premiership: 12th (relegated)
- Scottish League Cup: Quarter-final
- Scottish Cup: Quarter-final
- Top goalscorer: League: Bruce Anderson (7); All: Bruce Anderson (10)
- Highest home attendance: 8,396, vs. Celtic, Premiership, 31 March 2024
- Lowest home attendance: 872, vs. Clyde, League Cup, 29 July 2023
Home colours	Away colours

The 2023–24 season was Livingston's sixth consecutive season in the Scottish Premiership, the top flight of Scottish football. Livingston also competed in the League Cup and the Scottish Cup.

== Season summary ==
On 1 June it was announced that chairman Robert Wilson would retire from his position. The following week the club promoted Chief Executive John Ward to the position of Chairman, with Dave Black becoming the new Chief Executive, having previously been Business Development Manager and Head of Commercial & Media Operations - Black had in fact once been a ball boy for the club.

On 24 September 2023, Livingston announced a takeover of the club with new ownership led by businessman John McIlvogue and his company Baycup Ltd. McIlvogue would be taking up the role of chief commercial officer. The move was cast into doubt weeks later as former directors launched a legal challenge to the sale of the club. Manager David Martindale reported that the dispute was still ongoing at the end of the season, and his future was likely to be determined by the outcome of an upcoming court case. As of 4 June 2024, the case remains unresolved - no changes have been made in respect of the ownership or directors of the club resultant from the 'takeover'. There have however been changes to the board of the club's majority owner, Opcco6 Ltd, in January 2024 with the removal as director of the club's chairman John Ward. At the same time the company reported the appointments of Neil Hogarth and Carolyn Sumner as directors and, in March, Neil Rankine as company secretary. Rankine's appointment came shortly after the club reported that they had been able to settle a long-running feud with the former director in court.

On the pitch, the club enjoyed a strong showing in the League Cup, winning their group after three wins and a draw (losing the bonus point in a penalty shootout) against Hamilton Academical. In the second round they defeated Ayr United before succumbing to Glasgow giants Rangers in the quarter-finals.

In the Scottish Cup, they suffered a similar fate, succumbing to Celtic at the quarter-final stage after wins over Championship sides Raith Rovers and Partick Thistle (after extra time).

In the Premiership, Livi made a reasonable start but, after beating Motherwell on 7 October, failed to win again in 2023. They entered the winter break after a home defeat by Hearts, completing a run of two points from 13 games. During this run the team suffered seven losses in a row, including six successively without scoring, making them the first team to suffer six successive top-flight defeats with no goals since Aberdeen in 1999.

By February the team had surpassed the club's previous longest-ever winless run in league games, lasting 17 games between 21 October 2023 and 7 February 2024. The club's previous longest winless run in league games was between 14 May 2005 and 5 November 2005, stretching 16 games across the 2004–05 and 2005–06 seasons. This was brought to an end with a 1-0 home victory against St Mirren on 17 February.

Another winless streak followed, with the Lions reaching the Premiership's 33-game 'split' at the foot of the table, 12 points adrift of Ross County with five games to play.

After the split, the Lions managed to pick up a win in the first match, beating Ross County 2-0 at home, but they were relegated following a 4-1 defeat away to Motherwell the following week.

They also picked up a come-from-behind 2-1 win at home to St Johnstone, before finishing bottom of the table, 10 points adrift of County.

== Results & fixtures ==
Win Draw Loss Postponed

=== Friendlies ===
1 July 2023	Livingston	2–0	Queen of the South	Almondvale Stadium
15:00	Pittman 2'; Bradley 64'

4 July 2023	Livingston	2–0	Alloa Athletic	Almondvale Stadium
19:45	Brandon 29'; Anderson 66'

10 July 2023	Queen's Park	0–1	Livingston	Lesser Hampden
19:45		Report	Anderson 50'

11 January 2024	Winterthur	3–2	Livingston	Lara, Antalya
12:30	Di Giusto 20'; Burkart 74'; Lüthi 85'		Guthrie 37'; Welch-Hayes 45'

=== Scottish Premiership ===
5 August 2023 1	Livingston	0–0	Aberdeen	Almondvale Stadium
15:00		Report		Attendance: 5,630; Referee: John Beaton

12 August 2023 2	Rangers	4–0	Livingston	Ibrox Stadium
15:00	Lammers 10'; Danilo 78'; Sima 84'; Dowell 90'	Report		Attendance: 49,320; Referee: Don Robertson

26 August 2023 3	Hibernian	2–3	Livingston	Easter Road
15:00	Boyle 61'; Campbell 86'	Report	Obita 8' (o.g.); Anderson 63'; Sangare 75'	Attendance: 14,932; Referee: Craig Napier

2 September 2023 4	Livingston	1–1	St Mirren	Almondvale Stadium
15:00	de Lucas 89'	Report	Nahmani 90+6'	Attendance: 2,075; Referee: Nick Walsh

16 September 2023 5	Ross County	1–1	Livingston	Victoria Park
15:00	Murray 59'	Report	Anderson 72'	Attendance: 3,160; Referee: Euan Anderson

23 September 2023 6	Livingston	0–3	Celtic	Almondvale Stadium
12:30		Report	Hatate 14' (pen.); Hart (red card) 28'; O'Riley 48'; Maeda 90+5'	Attendance: 8,118; Referee: John Beaton

30 September 2023 7	St Johnstone	1–1	Livingston	McDiarmid Park
15:00	Costelloe 36'; Gordon (red card) 83'	Report	Kelly 57' (pen.)	Attendance: 2,691; Referee: Graham Grainger

7 October 2023 8	Livingston	2–0	Motherwell	Almondvale Stadium
12:30	Anderson 53'; Kelly 62' (pen.)	Report	Miller (red card) 45+1'	Attendance: 2,039; Referee: Don Robertson

21 October 2023 9	Kilmarnock	3–1	Livingston	Rugby Park
15:00	Armstrong 16'; Vassell 42', 60'	Report	Kelly 35' (pen.)	Attendance: 4,679; Referee: Craig Napier

28 October 2023 10	Livingston	0–2	Dundee	Almondvale Stadium
15:00	Montaño (red card) 70'	Report	Shaughnessy 82', 85'	Attendance: 4,210; Referee: William Collum

1 November 2023 11	Heart of Midlothian	1–0	Livingston	Tynecastle Park
19:45	Vargas 79'	Report		Attendance: 17,970; Referee: Chris Graham

5 November 2023 12	Dundee	1–0	Livingston	Dens Park
15:00	McCowan 57'	Report		Attendance: 4,769; Referee: Alan Muir

12 November 2023 13	Livingston	0–2	Rangers	Almondvale Stadium
12:00		Report	Dessers 26'; Tavernier 75' (pen.)	Attendance: 8,089; Referee: Steven McLean

25 November 2023 14	St Mirren	1–0	Livingston	St Mirren Park
15:00	Kelly 24' (o.g.)	Report		Attendance: 5,632; Referee: David Munro

9 December 2023 16	Livingston	0–1	Hibernian	Almondvale Stadium
12:00		Report	Boyle 28'	Attendance: 3,463; Referee: Grant Irvine

16 December 2023 17	Livingston	0–0	Kilmarnock	Almondvale Stadium
12:00		Report		Attendance: 2,820; Referee: William Collum

20 December 2023 18	Aberdeen	2–1	Livingston	Pittodrie Stadium
19:45	Miovski 42', 65'	Report	Guthrie 28'	Attendance: 13,794; Referee: Nick Walsh

23 December 2023 19	Celtic	2–0	Livingston	Celtic Park
15:00	Furuhashi 46'; Scales 51'	Report		Attendance: 58,703; Referee: Matthew MacDermid

27 December 2023 20	Livingston	0–0	St Johnstone	Almondvale Stadium
19:45		Report		Attendance: 1,602; Referee: Kevin Clancy

30 December 2023 21	Motherwell	3–1	Livingston	Fir Park
15:00	Spittal 14'; Bair 19', 35'	Report	Pittman 23'	Attendance: 4,076; Referee: Chris Graham

2 January 2024 22	Livingston	1–2	Heart of Midlothian	Almondvale Stadium
15:00	Shinnie 79' (pen.)	Report	Vargas 53'; Shankland 64'	Attendance: 6,161; Referee: David Dickinson

27 January 2024 23	Livingston	1–4	Dundee	Almondvale Stadium
15:00	Yengi 78' (pen.)	Report	Bakayoko 19'; McCowan 62' (red card) 74'; Robinson 79'; Mellon 87'	Attendance: 1,906; Referee: Ross Hardie

30 January 2024 15	Livingston	2–2	Ross County	Almondvale Stadium
19:45	Pittman 45'; MacKay 88'	Report	Murray 28', 85'	Attendance: 1,142; Referee: Alan Muir
Note: Fixture postponed due to a frozen pitch.

3 February 2024 24	Rangers	3–0	Livingston	Ibrox Stadium
15:00	Silva 40'; Matondo 45+2'; Cantwell 56'	Report		Attendance: 49,688; Referee: John Beaton

7 February 2024 25	Kilmarnock	1–0	Livingston	Rugby Park
19:45	Watkins 88'	Report		Attendance: 4,328; Referee: David Dickinson

17 February 2024 26	Livingston	1–0	St Mirren	Almondvale Stadium
15:00	Yengi 45+3'	Report		Attendance: 2,120; Referee: Euan Anderson

24 February 2024 27	Ross County	3–2	Livingston	Victoria Park
15:00	Brophy 21', 27'; Sims 90+2'	Report	Anderson 47', 86'	Attendance: 3,346; Referee: David Dickinson

28 February 2024 28	Livingston	1–3	Motherwell	Almondvale Stadium
19:45	Yengi 3'	Report	Nicholson 49'; Spittal 71'; Vale 87'	Attendance: 1,659; Referee: John Beaton

2 March 2024 29	St Johnstone	1–1	Livingston	McDiarmid Park
15:00	Clark 87'	Report	Shinnie 37'	Attendance: 3,287; Referee: Chris Graham

16 March 2024 30	Hibernian	3–0	Livingston	Easter Road
15:00	Obita 5'; Maolida 7'; Le Fondre 22'	Report		Attendance: 15,912; Referee: Nick Walsh

31 March 2024 31	Livingston	0–3	Celtic	Almondvale Stadium
12:00		Report	Brandon 49' (o.g.); Bernardo 72'; O'Riley 82'	Attendance: 8,396; Referee: Don Robertson

6 April 2024 32	Livingston	0–0	Aberdeen	Almondvale Stadium
15:00		Report		Attendance: 2,797; Referee: Graham Grainger

13 April 2024 33	Heart of Midlothian	4–2	Livingston	Tynecastle Park
15:00	Grant 29'; Oda 32'; Devlin 40'; Shankland 45+6' (pen.)	Report	Kelly 10', 22'; Yengi (red card) 58'	Attendance: 18,491; Referee: Colin Steven

27 April 2024 34	Livingston	2–0	Ross County	Almondvale Stadium
15:00	Anderson 12'; Kelly 53' (pen.)	Report		Attendance: 1,531; Referee: William Collum

4 May 2024 35	Motherwell	4–1	Livingston	Fir Park
15:00	Bair 21' (pen.), 68'; Nicholson 45+2'; Casey 74'	Report	Nouble 77'	Attendance: 4,161; Referee: David Munro

11 May 2024 36	Livingston	2–1	St Johnstone	Almondvale Stadium
15:00	Montaño 72'; Shinnie 90+5'	Report	Sidibeh 8'	Referee: John Beaton

15 May 2024 37	Aberdeen	5–1	Livingston	Pittodrie Stadium
19:45	Hoilett 58', 81'; Shinnie 74'; Polvara 77'; Boyd 90+3'	Report	Yengi 52' (pen.)	Attendance: 15,043; Referee: Alan Muir

19 May 2024 38	Livingston	1–1	Hibernian	Almondvale Stadium
15:00	Anderson 67'	Report	Maolida 49'	Referee: David Munro

=== Scottish League Cup ===
==== Group stage ====
15 July 2023 Group Stage	Brechin City	0–3	Livingston	Glebe Park
15:00		Report	Nouble 41'; Kelly 41'; Montaño 87'	Attendance: 585; Referee: Colin Steven

22 July 2023 Group Stage	Livingston	1–1 (1–4 p)	Hamilton Academical	Almondvale Stadium
15:00	Anderson 90'	Report	Winter 31'	Attendance: 923; Referee: Craig Napier

25 July 2023 Group Stage	Cove Rangers	0–5	Livingston	Balmoral Stadium
19:45		Report	Parkes 44'; Obileye 55'; Anderson 59'; Kelly 81', 90+2'	Attendance: 683; Referee: David Dickinson

29 July 2023 Group Stage	Livingston	1–0	Clyde	Almondvale Stadium
15:00	Anderson 75'	Report		Attendance: 872; Referee: William Collum

==== Knockout phase ====
19 August 2023 Second round	Livingston	2–0	Ayr United	Almondvale Stadium
15:00	Nouble 12'; Montaño 64'	Report		Attendance: 1,304; Referee: Kevin Clancy

27 September 2023 Quarter-final	Rangers	4–0	Livingston	Ibrox Stadium
20:00	Sima 10', 84'; Yılmaz 66'; Jack 90+2'			Attendance: 35,420; Referee: William Collum

=== Scottish Cup ===
20 January 2024 Fourth round	Livingston	2–1	Raith Rovers	Almondvale Stadium
15:00	Brandon 32'; MacKay 82'	Report	Hamilton 5'	Attendance: 2,580; Referee: Grant Irvine

10 February 2024 Fifth round	Partick Thistle	2–3 (a.e.t.)	Livingston	Firhill Stadium
15:00	McInroy 27'; Fitzpatrick 61'	Report	Nouble 66', 82'; Yengi 120'	Attendance: 3,843; Referee: Nick Walsh

10 March 2024 Quarter-final	Celtic	4–2	Livingston	Celtic Park
14:30	Maeda 7', 22', 86'; Furuhashi 90+5'	Report	MacKay 12'; Yengi 54'	Attendance: 33,232; Referee: William Collum

== Squad statistics ==
=== Appearances ===
As of 19 May 2024

No.	Pos	Nat	Player	Total		Premiership		League Cup		Scottish Cup	
No.	Pos	Nat	Player	Apps	Goals	Apps	Goals	Apps	Goals	Apps	Goals
1	GK	(England) ENG	Shamal George	38	0	32	0	5	0	1	0
2	MF	(Republic of Ireland) IRL	Shaun Donnellan	5	0	3	0	0	0	1+1	0
3	MF	(Colombia) COL	Cristian Montaño	23	3	10+6	1	5	2	2	0
4	MF	(England) ENG	David Carson	10	0	7+3	0	0	0	0	0
5	DF	(Scotland) SCO	Mikey Devlin (c)	35	0	26+3	0	5	0	1	0
6	DF	(England) ENG	Ayo Obileye	37	1	28+1	0	6	1	2	0
8	MF	(Scotland) SCO	Scott Pittman	37	2	27+2	2	3+3	0	2	0
9	FW	(Scotland) SCO	Bruce Anderson	43	10	17+17	7	4+2	3	0+3	0
10	MF	(Scotland) SCO	Stephen Kelly	37	4	17+11	2	3+3	2	3	0
11	FW	(Scotland) SCO	Daniel MacKay	28	3	10+13	1	1+1	0	2+1	2
12	DF	(Scotland) SCO	Jamie Brandon	41	1	26+6	0	1+5	0	3	1
16	MF	(Scotland) SCO	Steven Bradley	18	0	9+8	0	0	0	1	0
18	MF	(Scotland) SCO	Jason Holt	41	0	31+2	0	6	0	2	0
19	FW	(England) ENG	Joel Nouble	40	5	28+4	1	5+1	2	2	2
20	MF	(Liberia) LBR	Mohammed Sangare	33	1	10+15	1	2+3	0	1+2	0
21	DF	(Saint Kitts and Nevis) SKN	Michael Nottingham	30	0	21+5	0	0+1	0	3	0
22	MF	(Scotland) SCO	Andrew Shinnie	41	3	24+9	3	3+2	0	1+2	0
23	GK	(Scotland) SCO	Kieran Wright	1	0	0+1	0	0	0	0	0
24	DF	(Scotland) SCO	Sean Kelly	27	5	21+2	4	2	1	1+1	0
28	FW	(England) ENG	Kurtis Guthrie	33	1	11+15	1	3+2	0	1+1	0
29	MF	(Scotland) SCO	James Penrice	31	0	22+2	0	6	0	0+1	0
32	GK	(Scotland) SCO	Jack Hamilton	5	0	4	0	1	0	0	0
33	FW	(Australia) AUS	Tete Yengi	18	6	12+4	4	0	0	2	2
35	DF	(Scotland) SCO	Calan Ledingham	1	0	0	0	0+1	0	0	0
37	MF	(Scotland) SCO	Tommy Sharp	1	0	0+1	0	0	0	0	0
Players who left the club during the season
4	DF	(England) ENG	Tom Parkes	12	1	3+6	0	2+1	1	0	0
7	MF	(Republic of the Congo) CGO	Dylan Bahamboula	0	0	0	0	0	0	0	0
14	DF	(England) ENG	Miles Welch-Hayes	3	0	2+1	0	0	0	0	0
15	DF	(Wales) WAL	Morgan Boyes	3	0	0+1	0	1+1	0	0	0
23	DF	(Dominican Republic) DOM	Luiyi de Lucas	15	1	11+1	1	2+1	0	0	0
23	GK	(Northern Ireland) NIR	Michael McGovern	5	0	2+1	0	0	0	2	0
25	MF	(England) ENG	Danny Lloyd	5	0	1+3	0	0+1	0	0	0
38	MF	(Republic of the Congo) CGO	Scott Bitsindou	0	0	0	0	0	0	0	0
40	MF	(Nigeria) NGA	Samson Lawal	3	0	0+2	0	0+1	0	0	0

== Team statistics ==
=== League table ===
Pos	Team	Pld	W	D	L	GF	GA	GD	Pts	Qualification or relegation (Note: Teams play each other three times (33 matches), before the league is split into two groups (the top six and the bottom six).)
8	Hibernian	38	11	13	14	52	59	−7	46	
9	Motherwell	38	10	13	15	56	59	−3	43	
10	St Johnstone	38	8	11	19	29	54	−25	35	
11	Ross County (O)	38	8	11	19	38	67	−29	35	Qualification for the Premiership play-off final
12	Livingston (R)	38	5	10	23	29	70	−41	25	Relegation to Championship

Rules for classification: 1) Points; 2) Goal difference; 3) Goals scored; 4) Head-to-Head points; 5) Head-to-Head goal difference; 6) Play-off (only if deciding champion, UEFA competitions qualification, second stage group allocation or relegation).
(O) Play-off winners; (R) Relegated

=== League Cup table ===
Pos	Team	Pld	W	PW	PL	L	GF	GA	GD	Pts	Qualification	LIV	HAM	COV	BRE	CLY
1	Livingston	4	3	0	1	0	10	1	+9	10	Qualification for the second round	—	1–1p	—	—	1–0
2	Hamilton Academical	4	2	1	1	0	7	4	+3	9		—	—	2–2p	1–0	—
3	Cove Rangers	4	2	1	0	1	10	11	−1	8		0–5	—	—	—	5–2
4	Brechin City	4	1	0	0	3	4	8	−4	3		0–3	—	2–3	—	—
5	Clyde	4	0	0	0	4	4	11	−7	0		—	1–3	—	1–2	—

Rules for classification: 1) goal difference, 2) goals scored, 3) away goals scored, 4) matches won, 5) away matches won, 6) drawing of lots.

== Transfers ==
=== Players in ===
Player	From	Fee
(Scotland) Mikey Devlin	(Scotland) Hibernian	Free
(Liberia) Mohammed Sangare	(England) Accrington Stanley	Free
(England) Miles Welch-Hayes	(England) Harrogate Town	Free
(Saint Kitts and Nevis) Michael Nottingham	(England) Accrington Stanley	Free
(South Africa) Aphelele Teto	(South Africa) TS Galaxy	Free
(Nigeria) Samson Lawal	(Nigeria) Katsina United	Free
(England) Danny Lloyd	(England) Rochdale	Free
(Republic of Ireland) Shaun Donnellan	(England) Torquay United	Free
(Australia) Tete Yengi	(England) Ipswich Town	Free
(England) David Carson	(Scotland) Inverness CT	Free

=== Players out ===
Player	To	Fee
(Scotland) Jack Hamilton	(Scotland) Raith Rovers	Nominal
(England) Jack Fitzwater	(England) Exeter City	Free
(Republic of Ireland) Jaze Kabia	(Republic of Ireland) Cork City	Free
(Scotland) Jackson Longridge	(Scotland) Hamilton Academical	Free
(Belgium) Stéphane Oméonga	(Israel) Bnei Sakhnin	Free
(United States) Brian Schwake	(Spain) CD Castellón	Free
(Guinea-Bissau) Esmaël Gonçalves		Free
(England) Danny Lloyd	(England) Southport	Free
(Dominican Republic) Luiyi de Lucas	(Cyprus) AEL Limassol	Free
(England) Tom Parkes	(England) Hartlepool United	Free
(Republic of the Congo) Scott Bitsindou		Free
(Republic of the Congo) Dylan Bahamboula		Free

=== Loans in ===
Player	From	Fee
(Scotland) Daniel MacKay	(Scotland) Hibernian	Loan
(Northern Ireland) Michael McGovern	(Scotland) Heart of Midlothian	Loan
(Scotland) Kieran Wright	(Scotland) Rangers	Loan

=== Loans out ===
Player	To	Fee
(Scotland) Lucas Stenhouse	(Scotland) Bo'ness United	Loan
(Scotland) John Binnie	(Scotland) Inverkeithing Hillfield Swifts	Loan
(Wales) Morgan Boyes	(Scotland) Inverness CT	Loan
(England) Miles Welch-Hayes	(Scotland) Dunfermline Athletic	Loan
(Nigeria) Samson Lawal	(Scotland) Inverness CT	Loan

== See also ==
List of Livingston F.C. seasons
