= 2021–22 Livingston F.C. season =

Livingston
2021–22 season
- Chairman: Robert Wilson
- Manager: David Martindale
- Stadium: Almondvale Stadium
- Scottish Premiership: 7th
- Scottish Cup: Fifth round
- Scottish League Cup: Quarter-final
- Top goalscorer: League: Bruce Anderson (11); All: Bruce Anderson (13)
- Highest home attendance: 8,922 vs. Celtic, Premiership, 6 March 2022
- Lowest home attendance: 545 vs. Cowdenbeath, League Cup, 24 July 2021
- Average home league attendance: 1,800
Home colours	Away colours

The 2021–22 season was Livingston's fourth consecutive season in the Scottish Premiership, the top flight of Scottish football. Livingston also competed in the Scottish Cup and the League Cup.

== Season summary ==
The 2021–22 season was Livingston first full season under the management of David Martindale. Marvin Bartley who had been named club captain and head coach of the Livi reserve team the previous season was promoted to the position of assistant manager in May 2021.

== Results & fixtures ==
Win Draw Loss Postponed

=== Pre-season ===
26 June 2021 Friendly	Lincoln Red Imps	0–3	Livingston

28 June 2021 Friendly	Europa	0–2	Livingston

3 July 2021 Friendly	Livingston	3–0	East Stirlingshire	Almondvale Stadium
		Report

5 July 2021 Friendly	Livingston	4–0	Arbroath	Almondvale Stadium
		Report

=== Scottish Premiership ===
31 July 2021 1	Rangers	3–0	Livingston	Ibrox Stadium
15:00 BST	Hagi 30'; Wright 30'; Roofe 90'	Report		Attendance: 23,000; Referee: John Beaton

8 August 2021 2	Livingston	1–2	Aberdeen	Almondvale Stadium
15:00 BST	Anderson 35'	Report	Jenks 47'; MacKenzie 90+4'	Attendance: 1,710; Referee: Kevin Clancy

21 August 2021 3	Livingston	1–2	Motherwell	Almondvale Stadium
15:00 BST	Forrest 38'	Report	Watt 48'; Grimshaw 79'	Attendance: 1,718; Referee: Craig Napier

28 August 2021 4	Hibernian	2–0	Livingston	Easter Road
15:00 BST	Nisbet 51'; Boyle 89'	Report		Attendance: 13,431; Referee: Steven McLean

11 September 2021 5	Dundee	0–0	Livingston	Dens Park
15:00 BST		Report		Attendance: 5,015; Referee: Alan Muir

19 September 2021 6	Livingston	1–0	Celtic	Almondvale Stadium
15:00 BST	Shinnie 25'	Report		Attendance: 8,573; Referee: Euan Anderson

25 September 2021 7	Heart of Midlothian	3–0	Livingston	Tynecastle Park
15:00 BST	Smith 25'; Boyce 33' (pen.); Cochrane 64'	Report		Attendance: 16,175; Referee: Gavin Duncan

2 October 2021 8	Livingston	0–1	St Mirren	Almondvale Stadium
15:00 BST		Report	Erhahon 29'	Attendance: 1,627; Referee: Grant Irvine

16 October 2021 9	St Johnstone	0–3	Livingston	McDiarmid Park
15:00 BST		Report	Bailey 3'; Anderson 29'; Pittman 66'	Attendance: 4,274; Referee: Grant Irvine

23 October 2021 10	Ross County	2–3	Livingston	Victoria Park
15:00 BST	Clarke 7'; Callachan 67' (pen.)	Report	Anderson 31'; Bailey 43'; Parkes 90+5'	Attendance: 2,566; Referee: Euan Anderson

27 October 2021 11	Livingston	1–1	Dundee United	Almondvale Stadium
19:45 BST	Clark 36' (o.g.); Williamson (red card) 45+1'	Report	Pawlett 43'	Attendance: 2,586; Referee: Colin Steven

30 October 2021 12	Celtic	0–0	Livingston	Celtic Park
15:00 BST		Report	Obileye (red card) 90+2'	Attendance: 2,566; Referee: Bobby Madden

20 November 2021 13	St Mirren	1–1	Livingston	St Mirren Park
15:00 BST	McGrath 68'	Report	Devlin 88'	Attendance: 3,016; Referee: Steven McLean

28 November 2021 14	Livingston	1–3	Rangers	Almondvale Stadium
12:30 BST	Anderson 30'	Report	Arfield 8'; Aribo 16'; Sakala 78'	Attendance: 8,825; Referee: David Munro

1 December 2021 15	Aberdeen	2–0	Livingston	Pittodrie Stadium
19:45 BST	Hedges 23'; Bates 75'	Report	Longridge (red card) 61'	Attendance: 6,295; Referee: Craig Napier

5 December 2021 16	Livingston	0–1	Heart of Midlothian	Almondvale Stadium
15:00 BST		Report	Boyce 49'	Attendance: 5,597; Referee: Kevin Clancy

8 December 2021 17	Livingston	1–0	Hibernian	Almondvale Stadium
19:45 BST	McMillan 16'	Report	McGinn (red card) 85'; Hanlon (red card) 89'	Attendance: 2,363; Referee: Don Robertson

11 December 2021 18	Dundee United	0–1	Livingston	Tannadice Park
15:00 BST		Report	Obileye 66' (pen.)	Attendance: 4,552; Referee: Gavin Duncan

18 December 2021 19	Livingston	1–1	Ross County	Almondvale Stadium
15:00 BST	Obileye 66' (pen.)	Report	Cancola 45+1'	Attendance: 2,554; Referee: Grant Irvine

26 December 2021 20	Motherwell	2–1	Livingston	Fir Park
15:00 BST	van Veen 13', 69'	Report	Anderson 87'	Attendance: 500; Referee: Don Robertson

18 January 2022 21	Livingston	2–0	Dundee	Almondvale Stadium
19:45 BST	Anderson 46', 56'	Report		Referee: David Dickinson

26 January 2022 22	Rangers	1–0	Livingston	Ibrox Stadium
19:45 BST	Arfield 75'	Report		Attendance: 48,343; Referee: Don Robertson

29 January 2022 23	Hibernian	2–3	Livingston	Easter Road
15:00 BST	Mitchell 6'; Cadden 32'	Report	Obileye 18'; Fitzwater 53'; Forrest 59'	Referee: Grant Irvine

1 February 2022 24	Livingston	1–2	St Johnstone	Almondvale Stadium
19:45 BST	Anderson 34'; Nouble (red card) 90+2'	Report	Hendry 11'; Crawford 90'	Attendance: 1,319; Referee: Craig Napier

5 February 2022 25	Livingston	2–1	Aberdeen	Almondvale Stadium
15:00 BST	Obileye 8'; Forrest 49'; Montaño (red card) 82'	Report	Ramírez 66'	Attendance: 4,276; Referee: Kevin Clancy

9 February 2022 26	Ross County	1–1	Livingston	Victoria Park
19:45 BST	Ramsay 90+3'	Report	Forrest 50'	Attendance: 2,224; Referee: David Munro

19 February 2022 27	Livingston	1–1	St Mirren	Almondvale Stadium
15:00 BST	Anderson 55'	Report	Kiltie 78'; Dunne (red card) 83'	Attendance: 4,228; Referee: William Collum

26 February 2022 28	Dundee	0–4	Livingston	Dens Park
15:00 BST		Report	Anderson 6', 21'; Pittman 18'; Fitzwater 65'	Referee: Bobby Madden

2 March 2022 29	Livingston	2–1	Dundee United	Almondvale Stadium
15:00 BST	Pittman 23'; Edwards 83' (o.g.)	Report	Smith 2'	Attendance: 1,864; Referee: Colin Steven

6 March 2022 30	Livingston	1–3	Celtic	Almondvale Stadium
12:00 BST	Shinnie 56'	Report	Maeda 17'; Devlin 46' (o.g.); Forrest 55'	Attendance: 8,922; Referee: Nick Walsh

19 March 2022 31	Heart of Midlothian	2–0	Livingston	Tynecastle Park
15:00 BST	Baningime 3'; McKay 58'	Report		Attendance: 17,957; Referee: Euan Anderson

2 April 2022 32	St Johnstone	1–0	Livingston	McDiarmid Park
15:00 BST	Hendry 3' (pen.)	Report		Referee: Kevin Clancy

9 April 2022 33	Livingston	2–2	Motherwell	Almondvale Stadium
15:00 BST	Bailey 26'; Forrest 58'	Report	Slattery 72'; Lamie 90+3'	Attendance: 3,848; Referee: Don Robertson

23 April 2022 34	Aberdeen	1–2	Livingston	Pittodrie Stadium
15:00 BST	McCrorie (red card) 78'; Ferguson 90' (pen.)	Report	Devlin 41'; Holt 70' (pen.)	Attendance: 12,338; Referee: Grant Irvine

30 April 2022 35	Livingston	1–0	Hibernian	Almondvale Stadium
15:00 BST	Pittman 57'	Report		Attendance: 2,840; Referee: Chris Graham

7 May 2022 36	Livingston	1–1	St Johnstone	Almondvale Stadium
15:00 BST	Fitzwater 90'	Report	Middleton 76'	Attendance: 1,499; Referee: William Collum

11 May 2022 37	St Mirren	0–0	Livingston	St Mirren Park
19:30 BST		Report		Attendance: 4,554; Referee: Kevin Clancy

15 May 2022 38	Livingston	2–1	Dundee	Almondvale Stadium
12:15 BST	Shinnie 78'; Forrest 84'	Report	Mulligan 59'	Referee: John Beaton

=== Scottish League Cup ===
==== Group stage ====
10 July 2021 Group Stage	Brechin City	0–3	Livingston	Glebe Park
15:00		Report	Parkes 1'; Obileye 61'; Longridge 90+1'	Attendance: 250; Referee: Kevin Clancy

17 July 2021 Group Stage	Alloa Athletic	2–1	Livingston	Recreation Park
15:00	Taggart 82'; Trouten 86' (pen.)	Report	Anderson 63'	Attendance: 294; Referee: Craig Napier

21 July 2021 Group Stage	Livingston	0–0 (6–5 p)	Raith Rovers	Almondvale Stadium
19:45		Report		Attendance: 853; Referee: William Collum

24 July 2021 Group Stage	Livingston	3–1	Cowdenbeath	Almondvale Stadium
15:00	Todd 21' (o.g.); Anderson 38'; Sibbald 53'	Report	Buchanan 9'	Attendance: 545; Referee: Steven Reid

==== Knockout round ====
14 August 2021 Second Round	Livingston	1–1 (4–3 p)	St Mirren	Almondvale Stadium
15:00	Forrest 41'	Report	McCarthy 82'	Attendance: 1,855; Referee: David Munro

22 September 2021 Quarter-final	Rangers	2–0	Livingston	Glasgow
19:45	Roofe 48'; Morelos 63'	Report		Stadium: Ibrox Stadium; Attendance: 35,579; Referee: Don Robertson

=== Scottish Cup ===
22 January 2022 Fourth Round	Livingston	1–0	Ross County	Almondvale Stadium
15:00 BST	Obileye 16' (pen.)	Report		Attendance: 1,227; Referee: Bobby Madden

12 February 2022 Fifth Round	Heart of Midlothian	0–0 (4–3 p)	Livingston	Tynecastle Park
15:00 BST		Report		Attendance: 12,232; Referee: Nick Walsh

== Squad statistics ==
=== Appearances ===
As of 15 May 2022

No.	Pos	Nat	Player	Total		Premiership		League Cup		Scottish Cup	
No.	Pos	Nat	Player	Apps	Goals	Apps	Goals	Apps	Goals	Apps	Goals
1	GK	(Wales) WAL	Daniel Barden	1	0	0	0	1	0	0	0
2	DF	(Scotland) SCO	Nicky Devlin (c)	39	2	34+3	2	0	0	2	0
3	MF	(Scotland) SCO	Jackson Longridge	21	1	9+7	0	4	1	1	0
4	DF	(England) ENG	Tom Parkes	11	2	6+2	1	3	1	0	0
5	DF	(England) ENG	Jack Fitzwater	44	2	38	2	4	0	2	0
6	DF	(England) ENG	Ayo Obileye	40	6	32+2	4	2+2	1	2	1
8	MF	(Scotland) SCO	Scott Pittman	34	4	22+6	4	4	0	2	0
9	FW	(Scotland) SCO	Bruce Anderson	34	13	20+8	11	4	2	2	0
10	MF	(Scotland) SCO	Craig Sibbald	17	1	10+4	0	2+1	1	0	0
11	MF	(Colombia) COL	Cristian Montaño	19	0	7+7	0	1+2	0	0+2	0
12	FW	(United States) USA	Sebastian Soto	12	0	2+10	0	0	0	0	0
14	MF	(England) ENG	Odin Bailey	33	3	22+9	3	0	0	1+1	0
15	DF	(Wales) WAL	Morgan Boyes	9	0	4+5	0	0	0	0	0
16	DF	(England) ENG	Adam Lewis	13	0	6+3	0	3+1	0	0	0
17	MF	(Scotland) SCO	Alan Forrest	38	6	26+10	6	0+1	0	1	0
18	MF	(Scotland) SCO	Jason Holt	42	1	37	1	2+1	0	2	0
19	FW	(England) ENG	Joel Nouble	18	0	13+3	0	0	0	1+1	0
21	DF	(Scotland) SCO	Jack McMillan	22	1	11+5	1	4	0	0+2	0
22	MF	(Scotland) SCO	Andrew Shinnie	33	3	18+12	3	2	0	0+1	0
23	FW	(England) ENG	Caleb Chukwuemeka	9	0	1+7	0	0	0	1	0
24	DF	(Scotland) SCO	Sean Kelly	17	0	9+6	0	1	0	0+1	0
29	MF	(Scotland) SCO	James Penrice	31	0	24+2	0	4	0	1	0
31	GK	(Russia) RUS	Ivan Konovalov	3	0	3	0	0	0	0	0
32	GK	(Poland) POL	Max Stryjek	40	0	35	0	3	0	2	0
33	MF	(Belgium) BEL	Stéphane Oméonga	29	0	25+2	0	0	0	2	0
36	GK	(Scotland) SCO	Gary Maley	1	0	0+1	0	0	0	0	0
40	MF	(England) ENG	Marvin Bartley	0	0	0	0	0	0	0	0
Players who left the club during the season
7	MF	(South Africa) RSA	Keaghan Jacobs	2	0	0+2	0	0	0	0	0
12	MF	(Scotland) SCO	Ben Williamson	7	0	4+1	0	1+1	0	0	0
14	MF	(Scotland) SCO	Josh Mullin	1	0	0	0	0+1	0	0	0
15	FW	(Slovenia) SLO	Matej Poplatnik	0	0	0	0	0	0	0	0
15	FW	(Saint Kitts and Nevis) SKN	Harry Panayiotou	4	0	0+4	0	0	0	0	0
20	FW	(Scotland) SCO	Gavin Reilly	4	0	0+1	0	0+3	0	0	0
23	FW	(Scotland) SCO	Jack Hamilton	9	0	0+8	0	0+1	0	0	0
30	GK	(United States) USA	Brian Schwake	0	0	0	0	0	0	0	0
37	FW	(Republic of Ireland) IRL	Jaze Kabia	4	0	0+2	0	1+1	0	0	0
38	MF	(England) ENG	Harrison Clark	0	0	0	0	0	0	0	0
39	MF	(Scotland) SCO	Carlo Pignatiello	0	0	0	0	0	0	0	0

== Team statistics ==
=== League table ===
Pos	Team	Pld	W	D	L	GF	GA	GD	Pts	Qualification or relegation (Note: Teams play each other three times (33 matches), before the league is split into two groups (the top six and the bottom six).)
5	Motherwell	38	12	10	16	42	61	−19	46	Qualification for the Europa Conference League second qualifying round
6	Ross County	38	10	11	17	47	61	−14	41	
7	Livingston	38	13	10	15	41	46	−5	49	
8	Hibernian	38	11	12	15	38	42	−4	45	
9	St Mirren	38	10	14	14	33	51	−18	44	

Rules for classification: 1) Points; 2) Goal difference; 3) Goals scored; 4) Head-to-head points; 5) Head-to-Head goal difference; 6) Play-off (only if deciding champion, UEFA competitions qualification, second stage group allocation or relegation).

=== League Cup table ===
Pos	Team	Pld	W	PW	PL	L	GF	GA	GD	Pts	Qualification	RAI	LIV	COW	ALO	BRE
1	Raith Rovers	4	2	1	1	0	5	0	+5	9	Qualification for the second round	—	—	—	p0–0	4–0
2	Livingston	4	2	1	0	1	7	3	+4	8	Qualification for the second round	p0–0	—	3–1	—	—
3	Cowdenbeath	4	2	0	0	2	5	6	−1	6		0–1	—	—	—	3–2
4	Alloa Athletic	4	1	0	1	2	2	3	−1	4		—	2–1	0–1	—	—
5	Brechin City	4	1	0	0	3	3	10	−7	3		—	0–3	—	1–0	—

Rules for classification: 1) goal difference, 2) goals scored, 3) away goals scored, 4) matches won, 5) away matches won, 6) drawing of lots.

== Transfers ==
=== Players in ===
Player	From	Fee
(Colombia) Cristian Montaño	(England) Port Vale	Free
(Scotland) James Penrice	(Scotland) Partick Thistle	Player Swap
(England) Tom Parkes	(England) Exeter City	Free
(England) Ayo Obileye	(Scotland) Queen of the South	Free
(Scotland) Bruce Anderson	(Scotland) Aberdeen	Free
(England) Harrison Clark	(England) Chester-le-Street United	Free
(England) Joel Nouble	(England) Aldershot Town	Free
(Scotland) Andrew Shinnie	(England) Charlton Athletic	Free
(Scotland) Sean Kelly	(Scotland) Falkirk	Free
(Saint Kitts and Nevis) Harry Panayiotou	(England) Aldershot Town	Free
(Belgium) Stéphane Oméonga	(Italy) Pescara	Free
(Wales) Morgan Boyes	(England) Liverpool	Free
(Russia) Ivan Konovalov	(Russia) Rubin Kazan	Free

=== Players out ===
Player	To	Fee
(Italy) Raffaele De Vita	(Italy) Lupa Frascati	Free
(Togo) Steve Lawson	Free Agent	Free
(Scotland) Aaron Taylor-Sinclair	Free Agent	Free
(Scotland) Scott Tiffoney	(Scotland) Partick Thistle	Player Swap
(Scotland) Scott Robinson	(Scotland) Kilmarnock	Free
(Scotland) Alan Lithgow	(Scotland) Greenock Morton	Free
(England) Jon Guthrie	(England) Northampton Town	Free
(England) Jay Emmanuel-Thomas	(Scotland) Aberdeen	Free
(Scotland) Ross Stewart	(Scotland) Heart of Midlothian	Free
(Scotland) Salim Kouider-Aissa	(Scotland) Airdrieonians	Free
(Nigeria) Efe Ambrose	(Scotland) St Johnstone	Free
(Saint Kitts and Nevis) Harry Panayiotou	(England) Aldershot Town	Free

=== Loans in ===
Player	From	Fee
(England) Adam Lewis	(England) Liverpool	Loan
(Wales) Daniel Barden	(England) Norwich City	Loan
(Scotland) Ben Williamson	(Scotland) Rangers	Loan
(England) Odin Bailey	(England) Birmingham City	Loan
(England) Caleb Chukwuemeka	(England) Aston Villa	Loan
(United States) Sebastian Soto	(England) Norwich City	Loan

=== Loans out ===
Player	To	Fee
(United States) Brian Schwake	(Scotland) Edinburgh City	Loan
(Scotland) Carlo Pignatiello	(Scotland) Dumbarton	Loan
(Slovenia) Matej Poplatnik	(Scotland) Raith Rovers	Loan
(England) Harrison Clark	(Scotland) Arbroath	Loan
(England) Joel Nouble	(Scotland) Arbroath	Loan
(Scotland) Josh Mullin	(Scotland) Hamilton Academical	Loan
(Scotland) Gavin Reilly	(Scotland) Greenock Morton	Loan
(England) Harrison Clark	(Scotland) Kelty Hearts	Loan
(Scotland) Jack Hamilton	(Scotland) Arbroath	Loan
(Republic of Ireland) Jaze Kabia	(Scotland) Falkirk	Loan
(South Africa) Keaghan Jacobs	(Scotland) Falkirk	Loan

== See also ==
- List of Livingston F.C. seasons
