= KPTK =

KPTK may refer to:

- Oakland County International Airport (ICAO code KPTK)
- KPTK-LP, a defunct low-power radio station (101.1 FM) formerly licensed to serve Austin, Texas, United States
- KPTR (AM), a radio station (1090 AM) licensed to serve Seattle, Washington, United States, which held the call sign KPTK from 2004 to 2012
