= Waterbury–Oxford Airport =

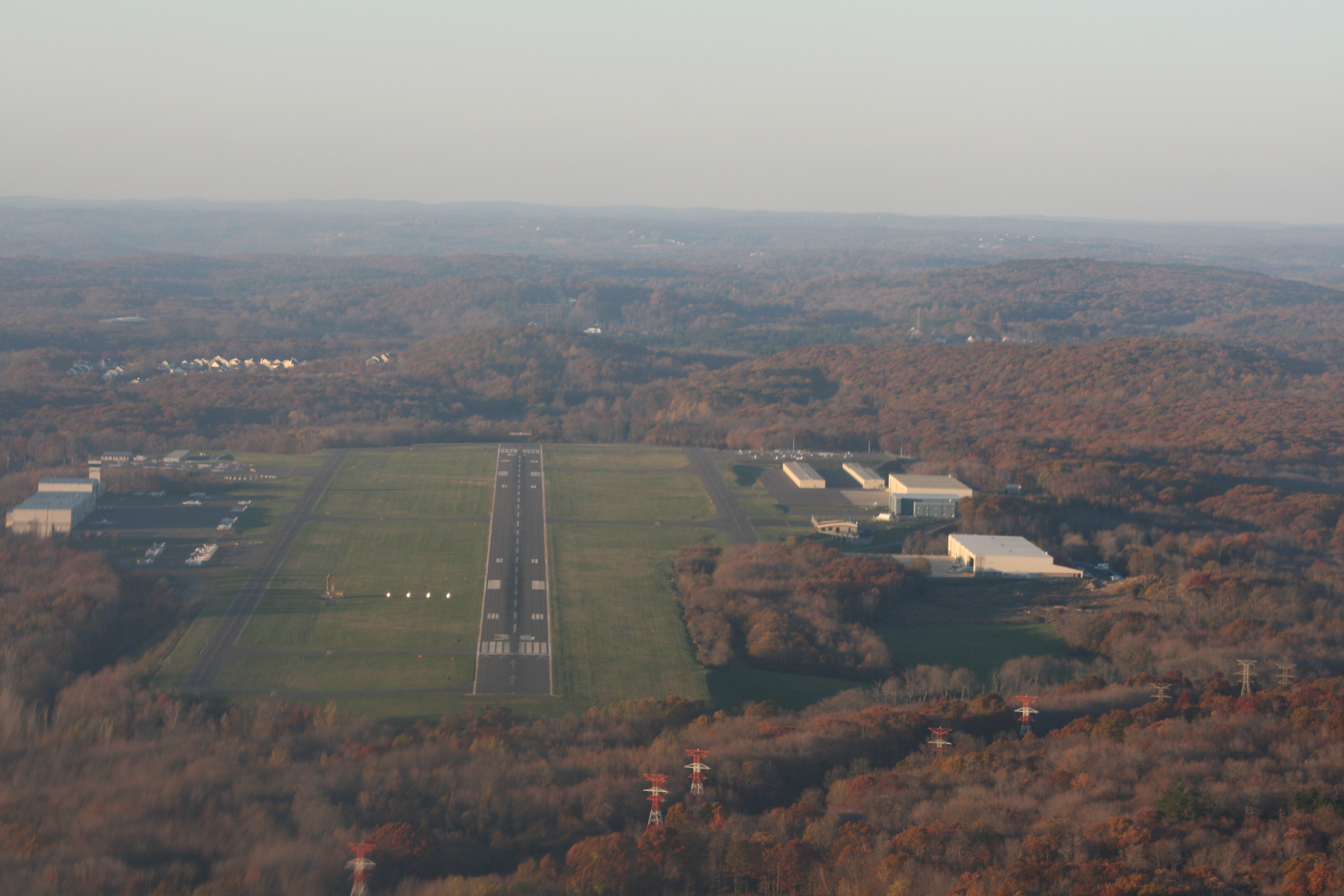
- IATA: OXC; ICAO: KOXC; FAA LID: OXC

Summary
- Airport type: Public
- Owner: Connecticut Airport Authority
- Location: Oxford, Connecticut
- Elevation AMSL: 726 ft / 221 m
- Coordinates: 41°28′43″N 073°08′07″W
- Website: OXC website

Maps
- FAA airport diagram
- Interactive map of Waterbury–Oxford Airport

Runways
Direction	Length		Surface
Direction	ft	m	Surface
18/36	5,800	1,768	Asphalt

Statistics (2015)
- Aircraft operations: 45,396
- Based aircraft: 257
- Source: Federal Aviation Administration

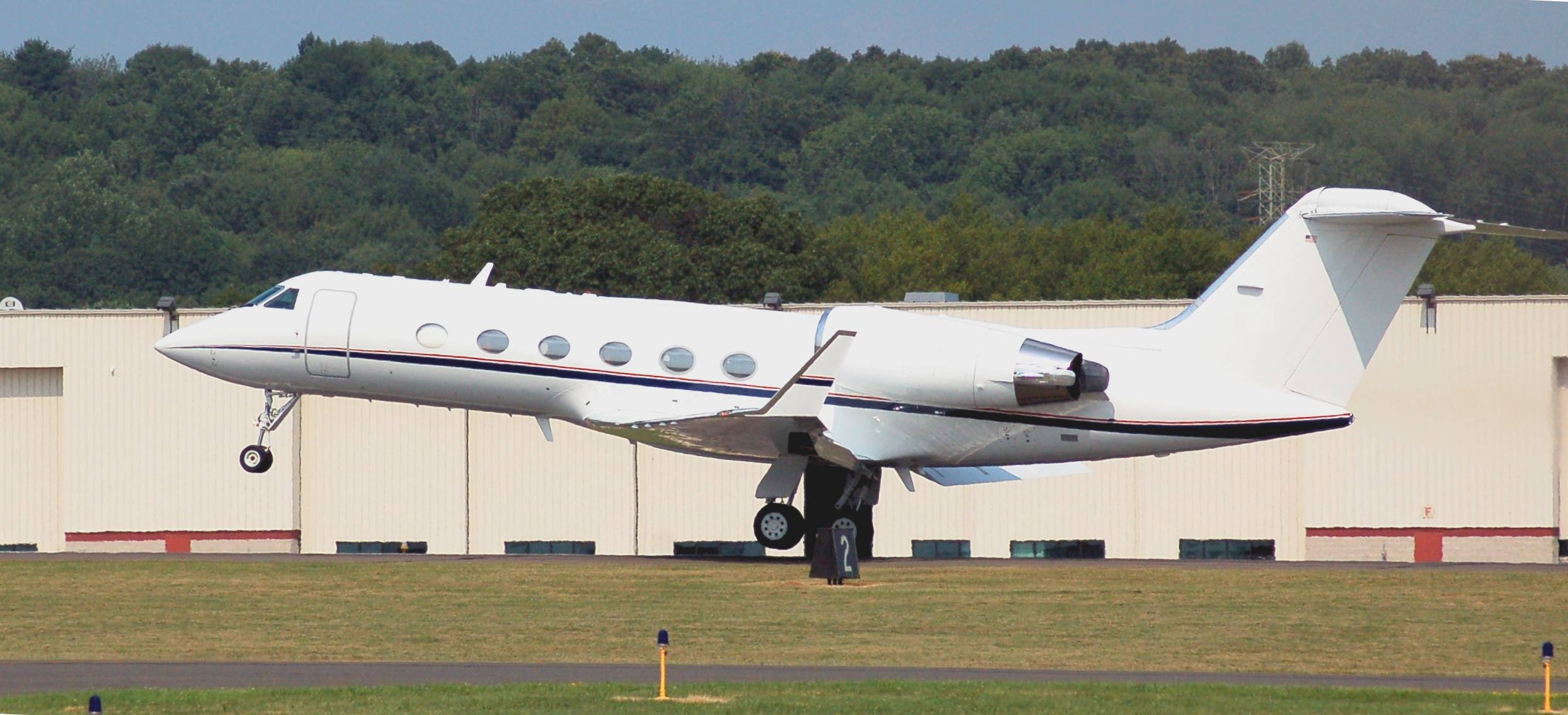
Gulfstream IV departing Oxford

Waterbury–Oxford Airport (IATA: OXC, ICAO: KOXC, FAA LID: OXC), also known as Oxford Airport, is a public airport located three miles (5 km) north of the central business district of Oxford, a town in New Haven County, Connecticut, United States.

The land on which the airport now exists was farmland until the mid-1960s. The first purchase of land by the State of Connecticut for the new airport occurred on August 22, 1966, from Adrian V. and Emeline (Miller) Lillis, who owned Trails End Farm, comprising 50 acres; the second purchase was from Michol and Agnes Ploch, containing three parcels totaling 133.75 acres. The groundbreaking ceremony for the airport was held on May 17, 1968, and the airport was officially opened with limited service on December 15, 1969. Uniroyal, Inc., did not own the airport land or the airport itself, but did own a few parcels near it, and in 1972 it contributed the land on which Airport Road was to be built, connecting the airport to Route 188, to the State of Connecticut. Uniroyal, Inc., was the first fixed-base operator of the airport.

It is included in the Federal Aviation Administration (FAA) National Plan of Integrated Airport Systems for 2017–2021, in which it is categorized as a national general aviation facility.

== Airport upgrades ==
In 2009, taxiway Echo was extended to connect to taxiway Alpha. This, and other improvements (such as an earlier project in which runway 18/36 was lengthened), have allowed for some larger aircraft to land at Oxford, although Gulfstream V and Global Express jets are the largest to currently operate at the airport on a regular basis.

== Facilities and aircraft ==
Waterbury–Oxford Airport covers an area of 424 acres (172 ha) which contains one asphalt paved runway (18/36) measuring 5,800 x 100 ft (1,768 x 30 m).

For 12-month period ending 31 October 2010 the airport had:

Aircraft based on the field	Around 250
Single-engine airplanes	Around 150
Multi-engine airplanes	Around 10
Jet airplanes	Around 90
Helicopters	Around 5

On a typical day, Oxford experiences anywhere between 150 and 600 total aircraft operations. Average aircraft operations ending the 31 October 2010 were 137 per day. 2010 showed a significant drop in aircraft operations from 2009.

In January 2008, the restaurant and bar called 121 Restaurant @ OXC opened in a building constructed adjacent to the airport's runway. The 121 Restaurant provides gourmet catering for private aircraft that operate in and out of Oxford, and also provides a place for observing airport operations while enjoying a meal.

The airport authority has confirmed that they will continue to renovate the airport according to the Airport Master Plan (AMP). Key Air New York Metro, also known as Key Air, plans to build these hangars on the southeast side of the state-owned field. Phase 1 of construction, which includes the largest new hangar, hangar H, is set to be completed winter 2012. The hangar will be built over a total of 89,000 square feet (8,300 m^{2}), along with an additional 48,450 square feet (4,501 m^{2}) of office space. The second phase of construction which includes 59,332 square feet (5,512.1 m^{2}) of hangar space and 16,150 square feet (1,500 m^{2}) of office space as part of hangar I is set to be completed in 2013. Due to a recent veto of proposed money by Connecticut governor Dan Malloy, the funds for building new office facilities around Oxford airport may be delayed.

On March 13, 2012, Key Air, the leading FBO service provider and aircraft management and charter provider at Oxford officially announced that they would be signing a memorandum of understanding with Pentastar Aviation. This agreement has allowed Pentastar to offer their charter, maintenance and avionics services on the east coast of the United States to complement their bases in Oakland County International Airport and Van Nuys Airport and to offer competitive rates to locally based aircraft. The facilities were officially opened on June 13, 2012.

The Connecticut Wing Civil Air Patrol 101st Western Group Squadron (NER-CT-101) operates out of the airport.

Pentastar is based in Waterford Michigan.. Key Air came close to default and was bailed out by Rizvi Traverse who paid off the note to Merrill Lynch... The Pentastar agreement never came to fruition... Clay Lacy of Van Nuys and Oakland took their place... However, not much has happened since. Clay Lacy says they will be opening in Winter 2003...But physical inspection of the property does not show much progress... Key Air CEO and President was named as one of CTs top tax delinquents to the tune of 300k. Buddy Blackburn (a long time airport service company employee) has been hired by Clay Lacy as the manager to oversee operations.

== Airlines and destinations ==
Waterbury–Oxford Airport is not currently served by scheduled air carriers, however, there are multiple international charter companies that are based at Oxford including Clay Lacy Aviation and Tradewind Aviation. Clay Lacy Aviation offers aircraft management and maintenance as well as executive or private charter in one of their many privately operated aircraft. Tradewind offers seasonal scheduled service from the New York Metro area to destinations like Nantucket and Martha's Vineyard, as well as shuttles between San Juan, PR and St. Barth. Tradewind also operates executive charter flights with its Pilatus PC-12 and Cessna Citation CJ3 fleet.

Since it is not certified as a Part 139 airport, operations at Waterbury–Oxford Airport are restricted to corporate and general aviation services.

== Accidents and incidents ==
On January 13, 2010, a small experimental aircraft crashed while landing. The one pilot on board died.

Exactly one year after the previous incident, a small light sport aircraft reported it was experiencing an engine failure. It was reported that the aircraft had landed in a front yard in Cheshire, Connecticut. Due to the depth of snow on the ground, the aircraft flipped front over after the nose was lowered. The pilot and passenger aboard walked away safely.

On September 6, 2024, a small airplane suffered a landing gear failure in Oxford. The two occupants inside the plane did not suffer any injuries.

== See also ==
- List of airports in Connecticut
