= John Bain (footballer, born 1923) =

Scottish footballer, manager, and chairman (1923–2019)

John Bain BEM
Personal information
- Full name: John Legat Bain
- Date of birth: 2 September 1923
- Place of birth: Edinburgh, Scotland
- Date of death: 2 June 2019 (aged 95)
- Place of death: Livingston, Scotland
- Position: Defender

Senior career*
Years	Team	Apps	(Gls)
- Portsmouth
- Reading
1952–1963	Ferranti Thistle		

Managerial career
- 1959: Ferranti Thistle
- 1974–1976: Meadowbank Thistle
- * Club domestic league appearances and goals

John Legat Bain BEM (2 September 1923 – 2 June 2019) was a Scottish football player, manager and chairman for Ferranti Thistle and Meadowbank Thistle (the predecessor clubs of Livingston).

== Club career ==
Bain left the Royal Navy in 1952 to become a planning engineer with high-tech firm Ferranti in his home city of Edinburgh.

He joined the company's football team Ferranti Thistle and starred as a left-back. He played until he was 40, and was convinced to take over as manager.

He then became chairman for 15 years before being convinced to step back in as manager when the club was renamed Meadowbank Thistle and joined the Scottish Football League in 1974.

Bain remained involved with the team, which changed its name in 1995 to accompany a relocation to Almondvale Stadium in Livingston, West Lothian, as the team's honorary vice-president.

== Personal life and death ==
Bain retired in 1980. He was awarded the British Empire Medal (BEM) in the 1988 New Year Honours. He died in Livingston in 2019, at the age of 95.

== Honours ==
Ferranti Thistle

- Scottish Qualifying Cup: 1962–63
