= Samson Lawal =

Nigerian footballer (born 2004)

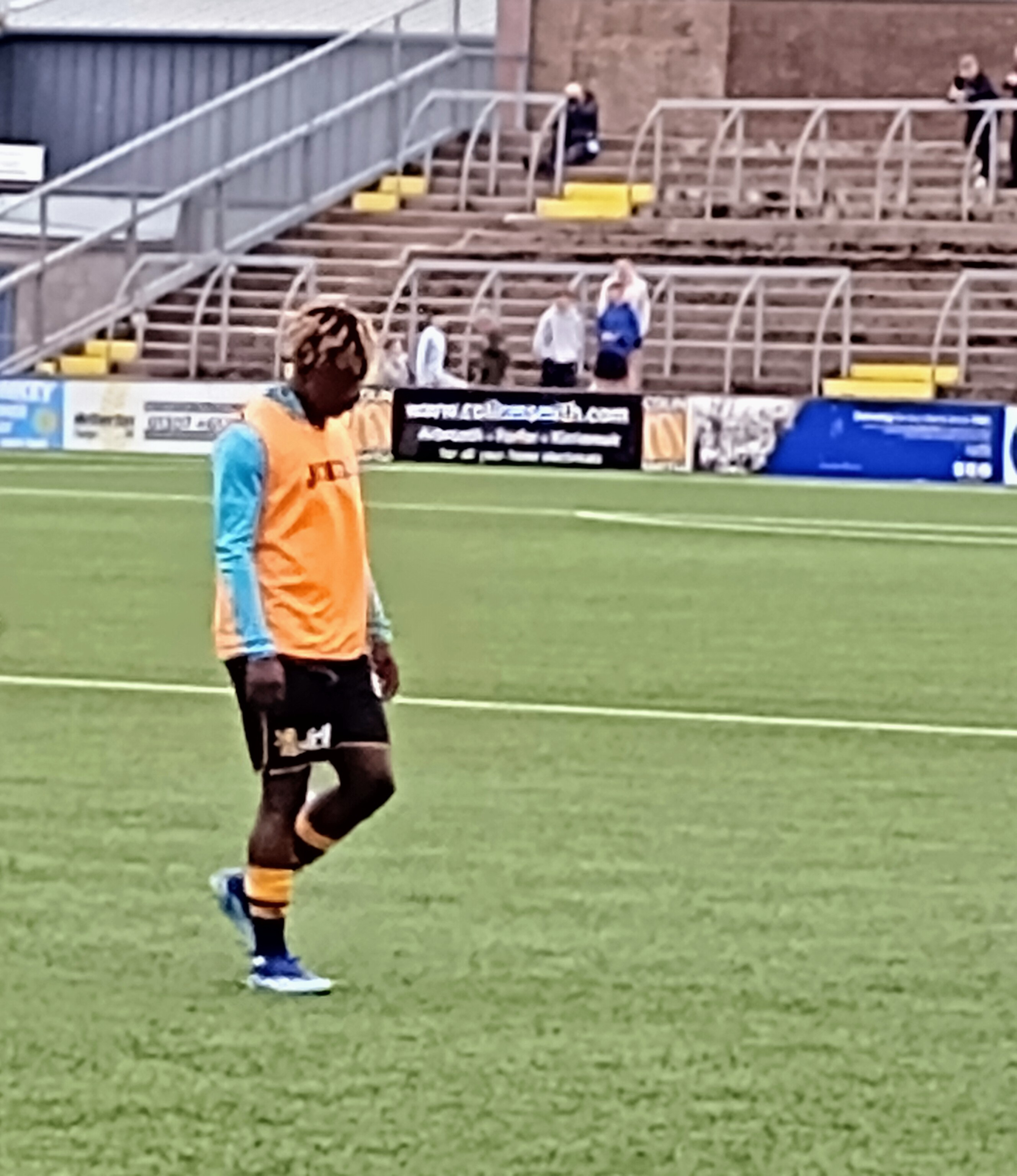
- Samson on bench for Livingston away at Forfar Athletic.

Personal information
- Full name: Samson Adeniran Lawal
- Date of birth: 25 April 2004 (age 22)
- Place of birth: Nigeria
- Position: Midfielder

Youth career
- Katsina United

Senior career*
Years	Team	Apps	(Gls)
2022-2023	Katsina United	5	(0)
2023–2026	Livingston	19	(0)
2024	→ Inverness Caledonian Thistle (loan)	9	(0)

International career^{‡}
2022–	Nigeria U20	16	(2)
- * Club domestic league appearances and goals as of 1 November 2025 ‡ National team caps and goals as of 4 June 2023

Samson Adeniran Lawal (born 25 April 2004) is a Nigerian professional footballer who last played for Scottish Championship club Livingston.

== Club career ==
On 11 August 2023, he signed for Livingston on a three-year deal. Later that month he made his first team debut in a 2-0 Scottish League Cup victory over Ayr United, coming on as a 90th minute substitute.

Lawal made his first league appearance for Livi on 23 September 2023, coming on as a second-half substitute for Andrew Shinnie in a 3-0 home defeat against Celtic.

In March 2024, he signed for Inverness Caledonian Thistle on loan for the rest of the 2023-2024 season. He made his debut for Caley on 9 March 2024 in a goalless draw at home to Airdrieonians.

Appearances were sparse in the 2024-25 season, Lawal making two league appearances as Livingston won promotion to the Scottish Premiership through the play-offs, and appearing three times in the Lions' successful Challenge Cup campaign.

Lawal made his breakthrough during the 2025-26 Premiership season, appearing in more than half of their league fixtures as of February.

He left Livi in May 2026 following the expiration of his contract.

== International career ==
Lawal has represented the Nigeria national under-20 football team and was part of the Flying Eagles' squad for the 2023 FIFA U-20 World Cup. Lawal scored in the group stage game against Dominican Republic, before the side were eventually knocked out of the tournament at the quarter-final stage by South Korea, after extra time.

== Career statistics ==
As of match played 17 February 2026

Appearances and goals by club, season and competition
Club	Season	League			National cup		League cup		Other		Total	
Club	Season	Division	Apps	Goals	Apps	Goals	Apps	Goals	Apps	Goals	Apps	Goals
Livingston	2023–24	Scottish Premiership	2	0	0	0	1	0	—		3	0
Livingston	2024–25	Scottish Championship	2	0	1	0	0	0	3 (Note: Three appearances Scottish Challenge Cup)	0	6	0
Livingston	2025–26	Scottish Premiership	15	0	1	0	1	0	—		17	0
Livingston	Total		19	0	2	0	2	0	3	0	26	0
Inverness Caledonian Thistle (loan)	2023–24	Scottish Championship	9	0	—		—		4 (Note: Four appearances in the Scottish Championship Play-Offs)	0	13	0
Career total			28	0	2	0	2	0	7	0	39	0

== Honours ==
Livingston

- Scottish Challenge Cup: 2024–25
- Scottish Premiership play-offs: 2025
