= Bruce Anderson (footballer, born 1998) =

Scottish association football player

Personal information
- Full name: Bruce Anderson
- Date of birth: 23 September 1998 (age 28)
- Place of birth: Banff, Scotland
- Height: 1.73 m (5 ft 8 in)
- Position: Forward

Youth career
- 2003–2011: Dyce Boys Club
- 2011–2017: Aberdeen

Senior career*
Years	Team	Apps	(Gls)
2017–2021	Aberdeen	31	(3)
2017–2018	→ Elgin City (loan)	14	(6)
2019	→ Dunfermline Athletic (loan)	14	(5)
2020–2021	→ Ayr United (loan)	9	(0)
2021	→ Hamilton Academical (loan)	13	(2)
2021–2024	Livingston	92	(24)
2024–2026	Kilmarnock	65	(15)
2026-	Livingston	13	(0)
- * Club domestic league appearances and goals as of 18:41, 14 November 2026 (UTC)

Bruce Anderson (born 23 September 1998) is a Scottish professional footballer who plays as a forward for Scottish Championship club Livingston.

== Career ==
=== Aberdeen ===
Anderson began his footballing career with Dyce Boys Club when he was five, before signing with Aberdeen youth teams when he was 13. His first experience of senior football came when he moved out on loan to Scottish League Two side Elgin City at the beginning of the 2017–18 season. In five months with the club, Anderson scored six times in fourteen appearances, before returning to his parent club in January 2018.

He made his Aberdeen debut as a substitute against Rangers on 5 August 2018, scoring an equalising goal in stoppage time to secure a 1–1 draw. On 4 September 2018, Anderson signed a new deal until summer 2021. He joined Scottish Championship side Dunfermline Athletic on loan in January 2019.

Anderson was one of eight Aberdeen players who received a suspended three-match ban from the Scottish FA after they breached coronavirus-related restrictions due to visiting a bar in August 2020. On 5 October 2020, Anderson signed for Ayr United, on a season-long loan. However he was recalled by Aberdeen in January. He made 12 appearances scoring two goals against Albion Rovers in the League Cup. On 1 February 2021, Anderson joined fellow Premiership side Hamilton Academical on loan until the end of the season. He scored his first goal for Hamilton in a 4–1 win against Motherwell on 13 February 2021.

=== Livingston ===
Anderson signed a three-year contract with Livingston in May 2021, which due to take effect when his contract with Aberdeen expires. He moved in the opposite direction of fellow striker Jay Emmanuel-Thomas, who signed a two-year contract with Aberdeen on the same day.

Anderson was Livingston's top scorer in the 2021-22 season, bagging 11 league goals and 13 across all competitions in 34 appearances. The following season was less fruitful, with a return of 7 goals in the 36 appearances. His performances did, however, catch the attention of Georgian side FC Torpedo Kutaisi who made a six-figure transfer offer for the forward, which Livingston accepted. Anderson turned down the move without entering into discussions with the club.

=== Kilmarnock ===
After leaving Livingston as a free agent, Anderson signed a two-year contract with Kilmarnock in May 2024. Anderson departed from the club in July of 2026 upon expiry of his contract.

=== Return to Livingston ===
After spending pre-season on trial with EFL League Two side Rotherham United, on 1 August 2026 Anderson returned to Livingston on a one year deal.

== Personal life ==
Anderson has spoken publicly about life as a footballer with type-1 diabetes. Anderson first learned of his condition after being hospitalised with a football injury while playing for Aberdeen as a teenager. During a match for Livingston in 2021, Anderson collapsed having suffered a diabetic seizure on the pitch but made a full recovery.

== Career statistics ==
As of 19 December 2023

Appearances and goals by club, season and competition
Club	Season	League			National Cup		League Cup		Other		Total	
Club	Season	Division	Apps	Goals	Apps	Goals	Apps	Goals	Apps	Goals	Apps	Goals
Aberdeen Youth	2016–17	—							2 (Note: Appearances for Aberdeen under 20s/21s in the Scottish Challenge Cup in which age-restricted sides from the Scottish Premiership compete against senior clubs)	0	2	0
Aberdeen Youth	2017–18	—							2	1	2	1
Aberdeen Youth	2018–19	—							1	1	1	1
Aberdeen Youth	Total		—						5	2	5	2
Aberdeen	2016–17	Scottish Premiership	0	0	0	0	0	0	0	0	0	0
Aberdeen	2017–18	Scottish Premiership	0	0	0	0	0	0	0	0	0	0
Aberdeen	2018–19	Scottish Premiership	14	2	0	0	3	0	0	0	17	2
Aberdeen	2019–20	Scottish Premiership	11	1	2	0	1	0	1 (Note: Appearances in the UEFA Europa League)	0	15	1
Aberdeen	2020–21	Scottish Premiership	6	0	0	0	0	0	1	0	7	0
Aberdeen	Total		31	3	2	0	4	0	2	0	39	3
Elgin City (loan)	2017–18	Scottish League Two	14	6	0	0	0	0	0	0	14	6
Dunfermline Athletic (loan)	2018–19	Scottish Championship	14	5	0	0	0	0	0	0	14	5
Ayr United (loan)	2020–21	Scottish Championship	9	0	0	0	3	2	0	0	13	2
Hamilton Academical (loan)	2020–21	Scottish Premiership	13	2	1	0	0	0	0	0	14	2
Livingston	2021–22	Scottish Premiership	28	11	2	0	6	2	0	0	36	13
Livingston	2022–23	Scottish Premiership	30	6	2	0	4	1	0	0	36	7
Livingston	2023–24	Scottish Premiership	34	7	3	0	6	3	0	0	43	10
Livingston	Total		92	24	7	0	16	6	0	0	115	30
Kilmarnock	2024-25	Scottish Premiership	30	11	1	0	1	0	3	0	35	11
Kilmarnock	2025-26	Scottish Premiership	35	4	1	0	6	1	0	0	42	5
Kilmarnock	Total		65	15	2	0	7	1	3	0	77	16
Livingston	2026-27	Scottish Championship	0	0	0	0	0	0	0	0	0	0
Career total			238	55	12	0	30	9	10	2	290	66
