= Walter Boyd (Scottish footballer) =

Scottish Footballer

Personal information
- Date of birth: 9 December 1956 (age 69)
- Place of birth: Bangour, West Lothian, Scotland
- Position: Defender

Senior career*
Years	Team	Apps	(Gls)
–1979	Bo'ness United		
1979–1992	Meadowbank Thistle	456	(30)
1991-1993	Arbroath	61	(1)
- Linlithgow Rose
- * Club domestic league appearances and goals

Walter Boyd (born 9 December 1956) is a Scottish former professional footballer who played as a defender for Meadowbank Thistle, Arbroath and Linlithgow Rose.

== Club career ==
He started his career with Bo'ness United and was part of the side that was defeated in the 1979 Scottish Junior Cup final.

Boyd played for Meadowbank Thistle, turning out 456 times for the first team. He holds the record for most league appearances of any player to have played for Ferranti Thistle, Meadowbank or Livingston. He received a testimonial in 1988.

In 1991, Boyd signed for Arbroath. He went on to make 61 league appearances in two seasons for the Lichties.

He signed for Linlithgow Rose in 1993.
