= Edsel Ford II =

American businessman (born 1948)

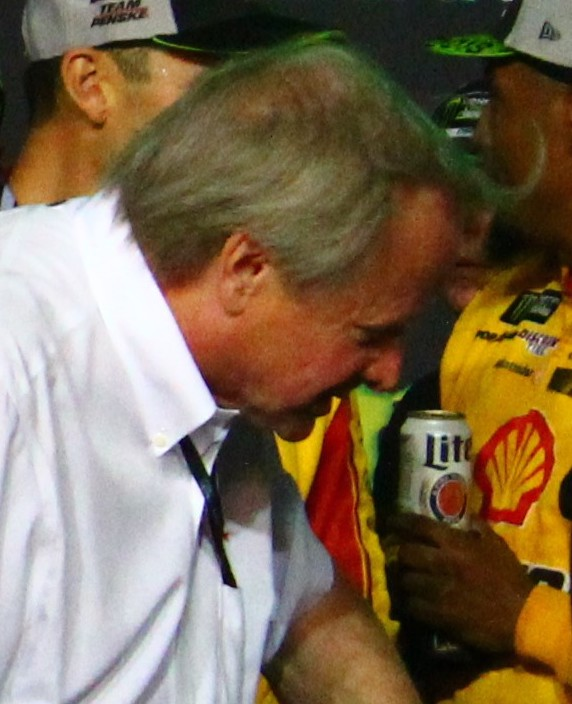
- Ford in 2018
- Born: Edsel Bryant Ford II; December 27, 1948 (age 77); Detroit, Michigan, U.S.
- Occupation: Board of Directors at Ford Motor Company
- Spouse: Cynthia Layne Neskow (m. 1974)
- Children: 4, including Calvin
- Parents: Henry Ford II (father); Anne McDonnell (mother)
- Relatives: William Clay Ford Jr. (cousin)
- Family: Ford

Edsel Bryant Ford II (born December 27, 1948) is the great-grandson of Henry Ford I, grandson of Edsel Ford, and the only son of Henry Ford II. He served as a member of the board of directors of Ford Motor Company for 33 years before announcing his retirement, and serves on the finance committee and sustainability and innovation committee. He is a cousin of the company's Executive Chairman, William Clay Ford Jr.

== Early life and education ==
Ford attended Eaglebrook School in Deerfield, Massachusetts, and graduated in 1968 from The Gunnery in Washington, Connecticut before entering Babson College. He received his business administration bachelor's degree at Babson and completed the Program for Management Development at the Harvard Business School in 1981.

== Career ==
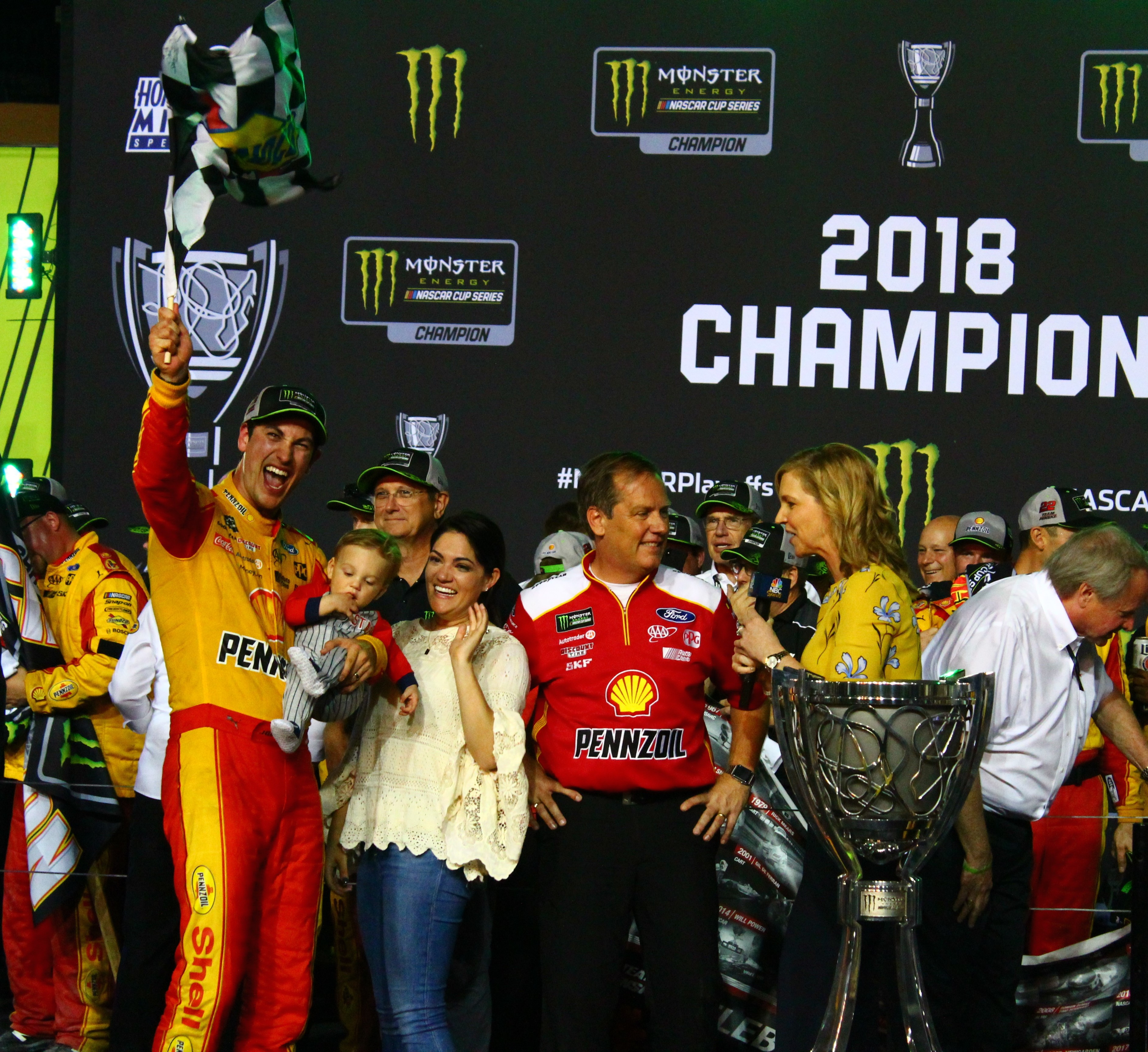
Ford (on right in white shirt) celebrating Joey Logano's 2018 Monster Energy NASCAR Cup Series championship

Between 1978 and 1980, Edsel ran sales and marketing at Ford Australia.

As a board member of Ford, Edsel has been active in company affairs and corporate dealer relations. He was named president and chief operating officer of Ford Motor Credit Company in 1991, and elected a Ford Vice President in 1993. In 2013, Edsel was awarded the Keith Crain/Automotive News Lifetime Achievement Award. Long seen as the public face of Ford Motor Company's motor racing efforts, particularly in NASCAR, in May 2019, Edsel was nominated for and won the NASCAR Hall of Fame's Landmark Award. His retirement was announced in 2021 and his son Henry Ford III was elected to the board to replace him at the May shareholders' meeting.

Edsel purchased Pentastar Aviation in 2001.

== Personal life ==
Ford is married to Cynthia Layne Neskow and they have four sons: Henry III (b. 1980), Calvin Robert (b. 1983), Stewart Spencer (b. 1986), and Albert Bishop (b. 1992). Henry III works for the Ford Motor Company in Dearborn, Michigan, and serves on the board of trustees of the Ford Foundation, and Calvin works for Pentastar Aviation in Waterford, Michigan.

Edsel Ford II is the chairman of the board of the Henry Ford Estate — Fair Lane in Dearborn, Michigan. He serves on the board of The Henry Ford. He is currently the director emeritus of the board of directors at Henry Ford College in Dearborn, Michigan, and also served on the board of trustees for the Skillman Foundation. He was previously chairman of the National Advisory Board of the Salvation Army and the Federal Reserve Bank of Chicago Detroit Branch. Appointed by then-mayor Dennis Archer, Ford was the chairman of Detroit 300, a major civic and philanthropic effort that organized the celebration of the city of Detroit's 300th birthday in 2001. Ford was then appointed as the founding chairman of the Detroit 300 Conservancy and was instrumental in the development and construction of Campus Martius Park (which the conservancy continues to maintain).

== See also ==
- Ford family (Michigan)
