= Carolyn Sumner =

Scottish businesswoman

- Occupation: Businesswoman

Carolyn Sumner is a Scottish businesswoman who was previously a director of professional football club Livingston.

== Career ==
Sumner was a director of Livingston until December 2014 when she resigned, following comments in the media made by shareholder Ged Nixon relating to undeclared bonus payments. In a statement made on the club's website, Sumner denied the claims that she had any knowledge or involvement in the matter.

Sumner and former director Neil Hogarth attempted to halt and suspend a potential takeover at Livingston in December 2023. The pair had lodged a petition with the Court of Session. In December 2024, Livingston announced that the club had reached an agreement with all parties in the court case.
