= Neil Hogarth =

- Born: January 1965 (age 61); Scotland, United Kingdom
- Occupation: Businessman
- Known for: Vice-chairman of football club Livingston F.C.

Neil Hogarth is a Scottish businessman who was previously a director and is currently a shareholder and vice-chairman of professional football club Livingston.

== Career ==
Hogarth was a director of Braidwood Motor Company when it sponsored Livingston's Almondvale Stadium in 2010.

== Football ==
By 2015, he held a 20% shareholding in Livingston. However, he quit his role with the club in 2020. In 2022, he was the subject of a fraud investigation relating to a missing six-figure sum discovered by forensic accountants.

Hogarth and former Livingston director Carolyn Sumner attempted to halt and suspend a potential takeover at Livingston in December 2023. The pair had lodged a petition with the Court of Session. In December 2024, Livingston announced that the club had reached an agreement with all parties in the court case.

In May 2025, Calvin Ford became the majority shareholder of Livingston, with Hogarth owning the remaining shares in the club. Days after the announcement of Ford becoming majority shareholder, it was announced that Hogarth was appointed as Vice-Chairman of Livingston.
