= Valter Berlini =

Italian footballer and coach

Personal information
- Date of birth: 1 February 1955 (age 71)
- Place of birth: Coriano, Italy

Youth career
- Rimini

Senior career*
Years	Team	Apps	(Gls)
1976–1978	Rimini	79	(1)
1978–1979	Mantova		
1979–1982	Padova	94	(3)
1982–1983	Prato		
1983–1984	Livorno		
1984–1985	Mantova		
1985–1986	Livorno		
1986–1988	Rimini		
1988–1989	Civitanovese		
1989–1991	Imolese		
1991–1992	FC Castello		

Managerial career
- 2008: Livingston (assistant)
- * Club domestic league appearances and goals

Valter Berlini (born 1 February 1955 in Coriano) is an Italian professional football coach and a former player, who played as a midfielder.

== Playing career ==
Born in Coriano, Berlini began playing football with Rimini, coming through their youth academy. He went on to make 79 appearances for the first team between 1976 and 1978.

Following a brief spell with Mantova 1911, he signed for Padova in 1979. He scored 3 goals in 94 appearances over three seasons with the club, as he helped them to win Serie C2 in 1981.

Berlini went on to play for several lower league clubs in Italy before retiring from playing in 1992.

== Coaching career ==
In 2008, he joined Roberto Landi's assistant at Scottish club Livingston. However, after less than a season in charge, Landi and his coaching staff were sacked in December 2008.

Berlini later coached the Rimini youth team, leaving his role in 2017. However, he later returned to the club and coached the youth team during the 2022-23 Province Tournament.

== Honours ==
=== Club ===
Padova

- Serie C2: 1980–1981
