= Robert Wilson (Scottish businessman) =

- Born: 1956 (age 69–70); Scotland, United Kingdom
- Occupation: Businessman
- Known for: Former chairperson of Livingston F.C.

Robert Wilson is a Scottish businessman who was previously the chairperson of professional football club Livingston.

== Early life and career ==
He was brought up in Berwickshire and moved to Edinburgh in 1972.

Wilson is the owner of Mathieson Craft Butcher in Edinburgh.

== Livingston football club ==
In 2015, Wilson was appointed chairperson of Livingston, having been involved with the club from around 2009.

He was chairperson when Livi disbanded their youth academy teams in 2018, due to financial and governance pressures following being placed in the bottom tier of the new youth structure by Project Brave.

Wilson provided Livingston with a six-figure contingency fund to help during the 2020 coronavirus pandemic.

He retired and stepped down from his role with the West Lothian side in June 2023. John Ward was appointed as his successor the following week.
