= John Ward (businessman) =

Scottish businessman

- Born: November 1964 (age 61); Scotland
- Occupation: Businessman
- Known for: CEO of Scottish football club Livingston F.C.

John Ward is a Scottish businessman and football executive who is the CEO of professional football club Livingston. He is known for his involvement in the supply chain industry through companies including Fasteq, and later for his roles at Livingston and in the hospitality industry.

== Career ==
Ward founded Fastech (Scotland) Ltd in 1989 before selling the company to Trifast Plc in 1996. He later founded the Scottish supply chain company Fasteq, and became its chief executive officer in May 2000. In 2012, Fasteq was acquired by Haas Group International, after which Ward became managing director of the acquiring company. Haas Group was subsequently acquired by Wesco Aircraft Holdings in 2014. Following his departure from the company in 2016, Ward became involved in the hospitality and brewing sector through the Edinburgh-based brewery Krafty Brew.

Through Krafty Brew, Ward expanded into the hospitality sector, acquiring venues including the Star and Garter Hotel in Linlithgow, Woodland Creatures, Leith Social Club, and the former Old Dr Bells Baths building in Leith. Ward also acquired Spring Distribution and later established Spring Solutions Limited, which were subsequently acquired by Bond International and Diploma PLC.

=== Football ===
Fasteq sponsored Livingston between 2009 and 2013, while Krafty Brew later became the club's shirt sponsor in 2015. Ward became financially involved with Livingston in 2016 following the club's relegation to the Scottish third tier. He was appointed chief executive officer later that year and became a director in 2017.

He held the position until June 2023, when he moved into the role of chairman with Dave Black being appointed his successor as CEO.

In May 2025, Ward was replaced as chairman by Calvin Ford who purchased a majority stake in Livingston. Ward continued in his role as a director of the club.

Ward was re-appointed as CEO in September 2025, after Dave Black was appointed as Chief operating officer.

== Personal life ==
In July 2024, Ward faced a charge relating to an alleged threatening and abusive phone call. He was later cleared of the charges.Ward has also published a personal account of the case on his Substack newsletter.
