= Pentastar Aviation =

Airline of the United States

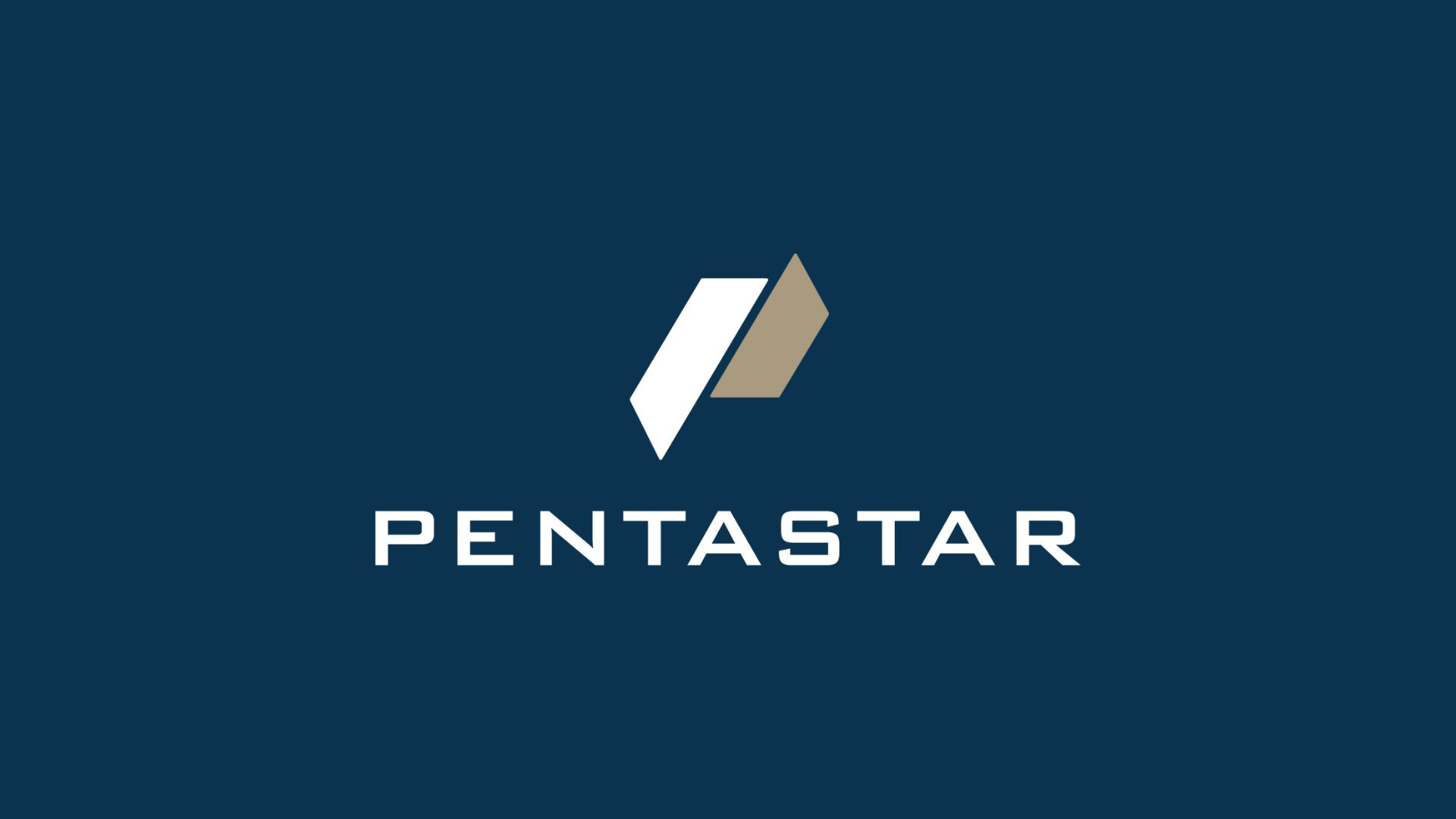
IATA	ICAO	Call sign
—	DCX	TANGO (air taxi ops)
- Founded: 1964
- Hubs: Oakland County International Airport
- Destinations: Point-to-point transit
- Headquarters: Waterford, Michigan
- Key people: Edsel Ford II, owner
- Website: www.pentastaraviation.com

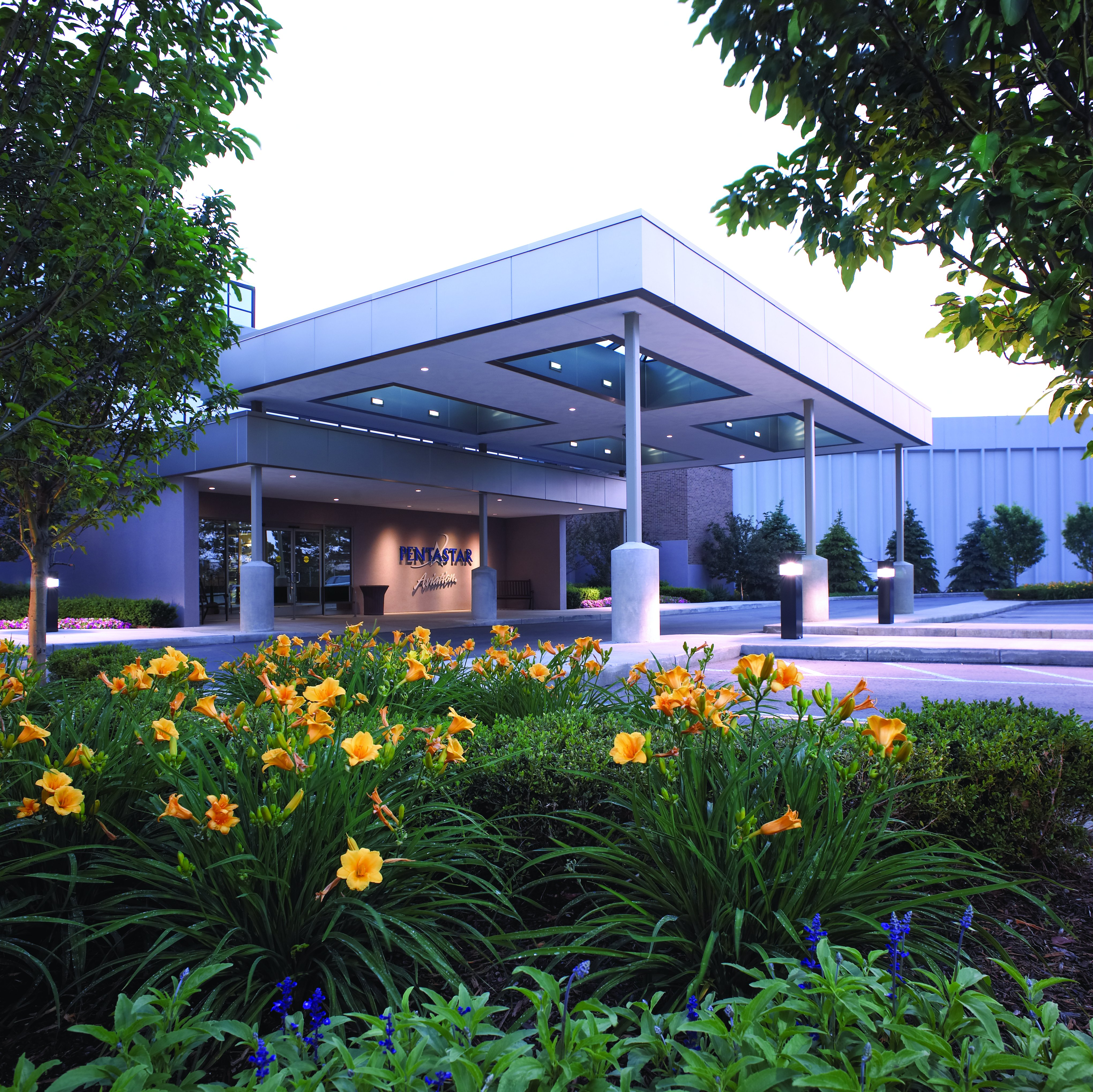
Pentastar FBO facility

Pentastar Aviation is an American aviation services company based in Waterford, Oakland County, Michigan. It provides domestic and international private charter flights, avionics, maintenance services, in-flight catering and FBO services. Originally a subsidiary of the Chrysler Corporation, the company was sold in 2001 to Ford family member Edsel B. Ford II.

== History ==
Pentastar Aviation began in 1964 as Chrysler Air Transportation, Chrysler Corporation's internal flight department based at Willow Run Airport in Ypsilanti, Michigan. The company was renamed Pentastar Aviation in 1980. Initially providing internal flight services, over time the division expanded to offer maintenance and avionics services, private aircraft brokerage services, fixed-base operation services and charter services through Pentastar Aviation Charter, Inc.

== Fleet ==
Pentastar Aviation Charter, Inc's fleet includes the following aircraft:

- King Air 200
- Citation Jet Series
- Hawker 400XP
- Learjet 45 / 75
- Embraer Phenom 300
- Citation XL/XLS
- Hawker 800XP
- Hawker 850XP
- Hawker 900XP
- Learjet 60 / 60XR
- Gulfstream 150
- Citation Latitude
- Challenger 300/350
- Citation X / Sovereign
- Falcon 50EX
- Gulfstream 200 / 280
- Legacy 450 / 500
- Challenger 604 / 605
- Falcon 2000 EX / LXS
- Gulfstream IV / IVSP / 450 / 400
- Embraer Legacy 600
- Dassault Falcon 7X
- Gulfstream V / 550 / 650
- Bombardier Global Express

== Aircraft maintenance ==
Pentastar Aviation holds Class 3 and Class 4 airframe ratings and maintains Gulfstream, Bombardier, Cessna, Dassault and Hawker aircraft. It also carries out avionics installation and repair at its facility at Oakland County International Airport.

On March 13, 2012, Key Air, the leading FBO service provider and aircraft management and charter provider at the Waterbury-Oxford Airport in Oxford, CT, officially announced that they would be signing a memorandum of understanding with Pentastar Aviation. This agreement allowed Pentastar to operate on the east coast of the United States in addition to their headquarters in Oakland County International Airport. The facilities were officially opened on June 13, 2012.

== Scheduled airline service ==
Twice Pentastar has operated scheduled airline service under a public charter arrangement.

The first was in 2013 and 2014 when they operated Saab SF340 aircraft on behalf of "Lakeshore Express" between Pontiac, Midway International Airport, and Pellston Regional Airport.

The second was for a startup, OneJet, operating Hawker Beechjet 400A aircraft out of an Indianapolis International Airport base to a number of destinations in the Midwest. This flying will transition to Corporate Flight Management in June 2016.
