= Calvin Ford =

American businessman

- Born: Calvin Robert Ford; July 1983 (age 43); Michigan, U.S.
- Occupations: Businessman, philanthropist
- Known for: Vice President of Sales & Marketing at Pentastar Aviation
- Spouse: Sarah Fox (m. 2011)
- Children: 3
- Parents: Edsel Bryant Ford II (father); Cynthia Layne Neskow (mother)
- Family: Henry Ford (great-great-grandfather)

Calvin Robert Ford (born July 1983) is an American businessman and philanthropist, best known as the great-great-grandson of Henry Ford. He serves as the director of the CATCH charity and Henry Ford Health, chairman of the Detroit Crime Commission, and vice-president of sales and marketing for Pentastar Aviation.

In May 2025, Ford acquired full ownership of Scottish football club Livingston, becoming chairman after purchasing 100 percent of Baycup Ltd, the club's holding company.

== Early life and education ==
Ford achieved a Master of Arts degree from the University of Denver and a Bachelor of Arts in history from the University of Virginia.

== Career ==
As well as involvement in philanthropic activities, he serves as an Executive Board Member for CATCH Charity, serves on the board of directors for the Henry Ford Health System, and chairman for the Detroit Crime Commission.

In 2016, Ford was appointed Vice President of Sales & Marketing at Pentastar Aviation.

Ford became a shareholder in German side SSV Ulm in May 2024, reportedly investing €3.4m.

In May 2025, Ford became the chairman and majority stakeholder of Scottish side Livingston. He acquired 100% of previous majority shareholder John McIlvogue's shares in Baycup Ltd. The club were promoted to the Scottish Premiership after defeating Ross County in the playoff final in May 2025.

== Personal life ==
Ford married Sarah Fox in 2011. They have three sons: Eli, Neil, and Walker.

== See also ==
- Ford family (Michigan)
