= Oakland County International Airport =

Airport in Michigan

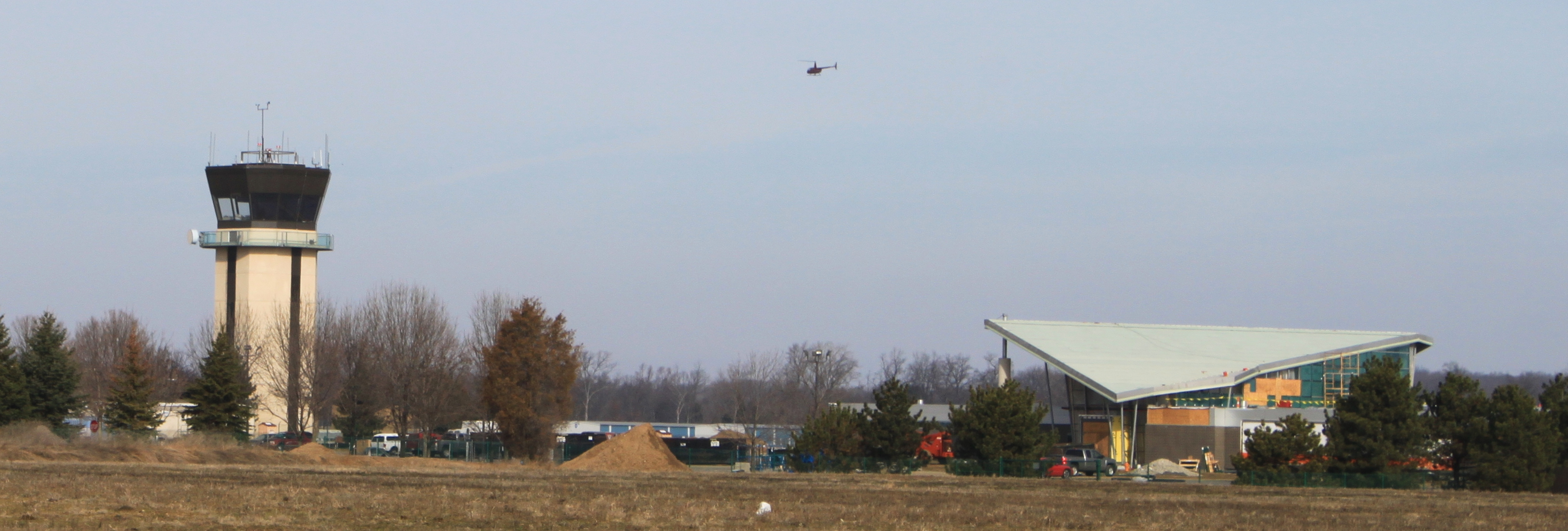
- IATA: PTK; ICAO: KPTK; FAA LID: PTK

Summary
- Airport type: Public
- Owner: County of Oakland
- Serves: Oakland County, Michigan
- Location: Waterford Township, Michigan
- Time zone: UTC−05:00 (-5)
  - Summer (DST): UTC−04:00 (-4)
- Elevation AMSL: 981 ft / 299 m
- Coordinates: 42°39′56″N 083°25′13″W
- Website: oakgov.com/aviation/

Map

Runways
Direction	Length		Surface
Direction	ft	m	Surface
9R/27L	6,521	1,987	Asphalt
9L/27R	5,676	1,730	Asphalt
18/36	2,582	788	Asphalt

Statistics (2022)
- Aircraft operations: 142,535
- Based aircraft: 658
- Source: Federal Aviation Administration

Oakland County International Airport (IATA: PTK, ICAO: KPTK, FAA LID: PTK) is a county-owned public-use airport located in Waterford Township, Oakland County, Michigan, United States. The airport is located approximately one mile from the center of Waterford Township and Oakland County. It is included in the Federal Aviation Administration (FAA) National Plan of Integrated Airport Systems for 2017–2021, in which it is categorized as a non primary commercial service facility.

It is the sixth-busiest airport in the United States without scheduled passenger service. Charters carrying sports teams competing at the now-defunct Palace of Auburn Hills nearby frequently used the airport. The airport was originally called Pontiac Municipal Airport when it opened in 1928 and became Oakland-Pontiac Airport later before adopting its current name.

The airport holds an open house every year, showing aircraft based at PTK, military aircraft, and vintage aircraft. The Civil Air Patrol acts as security for the open house.

== History ==
The city of Pontiac purchased 160 acres (65 hectares) of land on September 12, 1928, and on November 27 of that year the airport opened. It received its dedication in June 1929 and was named Pontiac Municipal Airport. On February 15, 1930, the airport received the first airport rating ever issued by the United States Department of Commerce's Aeronautics Branch (predecessor of the Federal Aviation Administration), receiving the highest possible rating of A-1-A. The Oakland County government bought the airport on February 25, 1967. The Oakland County Board of Commissioners gave the airport its current name on March 7, 1996, after L. Brooks Patterson suggested renaming the airport.

During 2013, Lakeshore Express operated by Pentastar Aviation operated flights from PTK to Chicago-Midway and Pellston on the Saab 340. Lakeshore Express flights suspended operations at the airport in April 2014, when the operator, Pentastar Aviation, elected to cease operating the flights.

During the existence of DaimlerChrysler from 1998 to 2007, the corporation operated a frequent shuttle service from PTK to Stuttgart Airport, near the corporation's headquarters, on an Airbus A319CJ. The flight boarded from a jet bridge that was added to the Pentastar Aviation FBO facility. This jet bridge was also used for sports charters to the Palace of Auburn Hills until being retired in the early 2020s.

== Facilities and aircraft ==
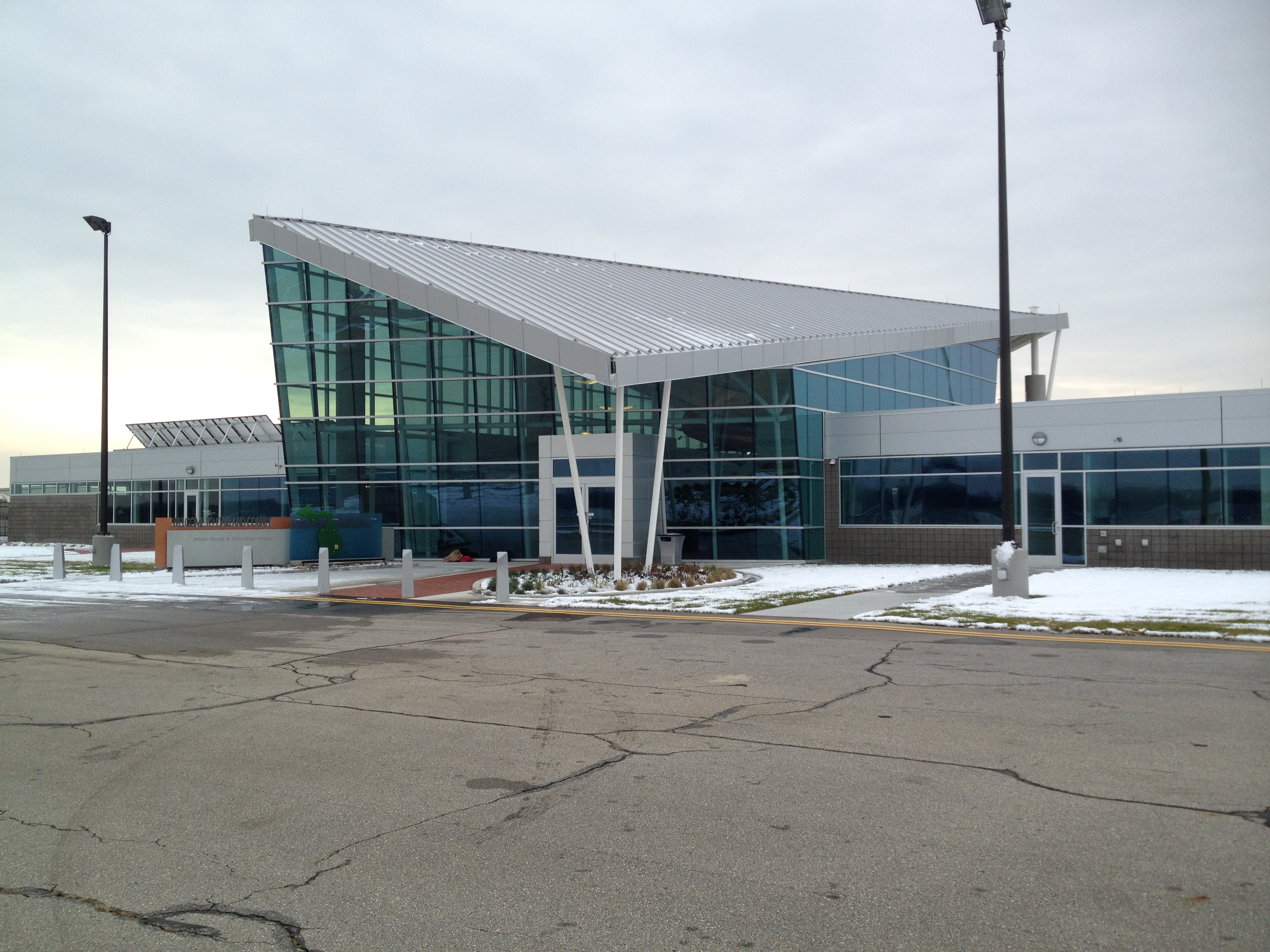
KPTK New Terminal Building

Located at 6500 Patterson Parkway, Waterford, MI 48327, Oakland County International Airport covers an area of 750 acres (300 ha) at an elevation of 981 feet (299 m) above mean sea level. It has three asphalt paved runways: 9R/27L is 6,521 by 150 feet (1,987 x 46 m); 9L/27R is 5,676 by 100 feet (1,730 x 30 m); 18/36 is 2,582 by 75 feet (788 x 23 m).

For the 12-month period ending December 31, 2022, the airport had 142,535 aircraft operations, an average of 390 per day: 90% general aviation, 9% air taxi, <1% scheduled commercial, and <1% military. At that time, there were 658 aircraft based at this airport: 325 single-engine airplanes, 220 jets, 95 multi-engine airplanes, and 18 helicopters.

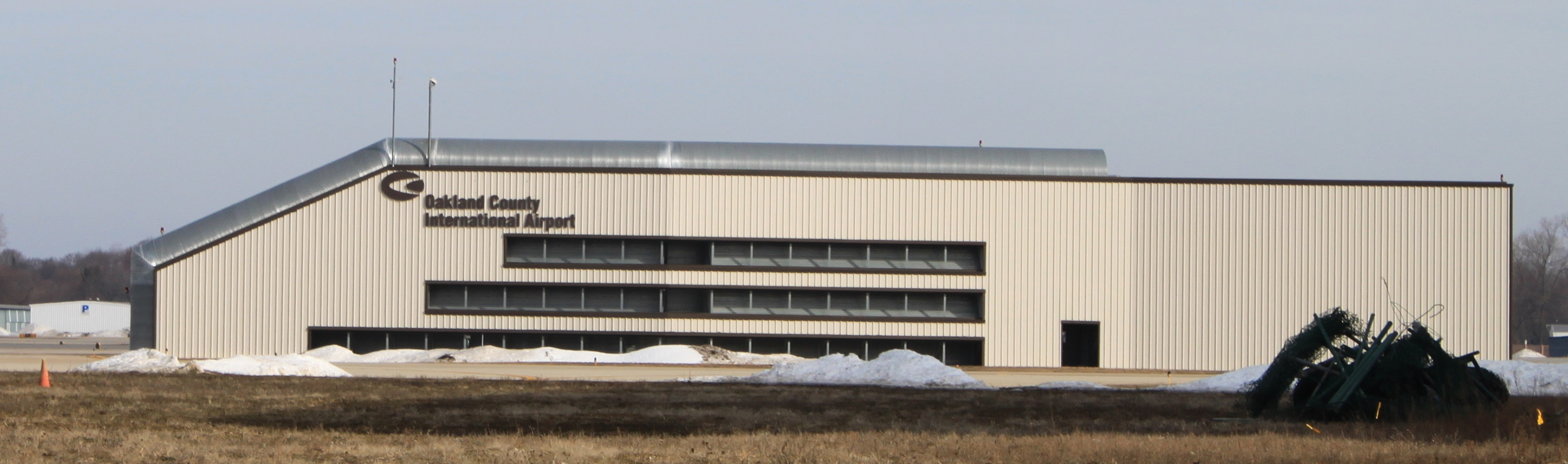
"Hush House"

Added to the airport facility in 2004, as part of a noise abatement project, is a Ground Run-up Enclosure, or "Hush House." This 3-sided structure is used by aviation mechanics for testing turbine powered aircraft. The airplane is taxied inside the structure and turned so the exhaust and thrust is facing the rear wall. The mechanics can then run the engines at high power. A majority of the noise will be either absorbed by the walls or deflected upward, reducing the impact to the surrounding community.

The airport has seven FBOs that offer fuel, aircraft maintenance, catering, hangars, courtesy transportation, conference rooms, crew lounges, snooze rooms, showers, and more.

== Accidents & Incidents ==
- On April 5, 1982, a Beech 95 Travel Air crashed at Oakland County Airport.
- On December 11, 1984, a Piper PA-31 Navajo crashed at Oakland County Airport.
- On July 4, 1987, a Beech S35 crashed at Oakland County Airport.
- On January 10, 1988, a Fairchild SA226T Merlin crashed while operating at the airport.
- On May 25, 1988, a Chappel Ratsrepus 30 crashed while operating at the airport. Destructive wing/aileron flutter is suspected, but the theory is not sufficiently substantiated through research and investigation to be considered the probable cause of this accident.
- On August 26, 1989, a Fiel BD-5 crashed after takeoff from Oakland County. The probable cause was found to be the pilot's failure to maintain adequate airspeed, resulting in a stall/spin. The accident was caused by an excessive pull-up maneuver and the pilot's lack of total experience in the aircraft.
- On August 26, 2001, a Hughes 269B was substantially damaged during a simulated autorotation at Oakland County. The engine failed during the power-recovery phase of autorotational descent, and a main rotor blade contacted the tailboom after touchdown. It was found the operator did not comply with associated checklists.
- On September 2, 2003, a Cessna 152 sustained substantial damage when its nose landing gear collapsed while landing at Oakland County. The probable cause was found to be the solo student pilot's inadequate recovery from a bounced landing.
- On December 3, 2003, a Cessna 152 impacted terrain while executing a forced landing near Pontiac. The aircraft was on final for Oakland County Airport when it experienced a loss of engine power, the cause of which could not be determined.
- On September 18, 2004, an Abbott RAF 2000 sustained substantial damage during a forced landing at Oakland County. The private pilot onboard had completed an engine run for 30-40 minutes before takeoff to verify operation after a recent engine cooling system modification. The pilot noted performance was not as expected on initial climbout, and the aircraft started to lose power, forcing the pilot to land off-airport despite an attempt to return to the airport. The probable cause was found to be partial power loss due to overheating of the cylinders due to the pilot's improper servicing of the modified engine cooling system, particularly doing so without maintenance instructions available for reference.
- On January 27, 2006, a Bellanca 7ECA impacted terrain while maneuvering for landing at Oakland County. The plane, which had been operating in the traffic pattern, was reported to be in a steep bank before descending and impacting the ground. The commercial pilot and flight instructor onboard received fatal injuries. The probable cause of the accident was found to be an excessive bank angle executed by the flight crew and their failure to maintain airspeed during the turn, leading to an inadvertent stall and subsequent impact with the ground. A contributing factor was low altitude.
- On September 29, 2006, a Beechcraft B19 Musketeer crashed at Oakland during a hard landing. The aircraft porpoised during landing, resulting in a nose landing gear collapse. The probable cause of the accident was found to be the pilot's failure to perform a go-around when he realized the aircraft was not stabilized on final.
- On September 5, 2007, a Cessna 172 Skyhawk was substantially damaged during a hard landing at Oakland County. The pilot reported the aircraft bounced, and they added power while applying back pressure to stabilize the aircraft, then retarded power to settle back to the runway. Post-landing inspections revealed damage to the firewall, cabin floor, and lower fuselage skin. The probable cause was found to be the pilot's misjudgment of the landing flare and improper recovery from the bounced landing.
- On March 17, 2013, a Cessna 172 Skyhawk was involved in an accident while taxiing at Oakland County Airport. The pilot onboard reported the aircraft's engine suddenly went to full power despite normal instrument readings. The pilot stopped the aircraft by closing the throttle, cutting off the fuel/air mixture, and applying brakes, but the aircraft still managed to exit the taxiway before stopping, impacting a snowbank and flipping over. The probable cause of the accident was found to be the pilot's failure to maintain airplane control after an unexplained increase in engine power while taxiing.
- On June 6, 2013, a Cessna 172 Skyhawk crashed during takeoff at Oakland while practicing a soft field takeoff procedure. The aircraft yawed right during the takeoff roll, and the aircraft continued right after liftoff. As the student pilot onboard corrected, pitch attitude increased. The flight instructor onboard tried taking controls, but the student did not relieve them, and the aircraft stalled and crashed. The probable cause of the accident was meant to be the student pilot's failure to maintain aircraft control during the takeoff and his interference with the flight instructor's attempt to provide remedial action.
- On August 23, 2015, a Luscombe 8 was substantially damaged during a landing attempt at Oakland. The pilot reported that the aircraft weathervaned into the 90-degree crosswind after touchdown which the pilot was unable to correct. The aircraft skidded off the runway, struck airport lights and signs, and came to rest on the nose, damaging the fuselage and the right wing. The probable cause was found to be the pilot's failure to main control of the aircraft while landing with a left quartering tailing. Contributing was the pilot's inability to conduct a go-around due to carburetor-ice induced loss of engine power.
- On December 23, 2016, an Aeronca 15AC Sedan was substantially damaged while landing at Oakland County. The sole pilot on board, who was uninjured, was practicing landings in the aircraft, which was tail-wheel equipped. After 15 landings, all of which were uneventful, the aircraft suddenly swerved left after touchdown on the final attempt. The pilot attempted to regain control, but the aircraft entered another swerve to the right and impacted a snowbank near the runway, at which point it nosed over.
- On April 9, 2017, a Piper PA-28 Cherokee crashed during a touch-and-go due to a landing gear collapse. The two on board were uninjured, but the aircraft was substantially damaged. The probable cause of the incident was found to be maintenance personnel's improper securing of an unused instrument lamp socket, resulting in an electrical short of the landing gear controls, preventing the gear from transitioning to the full down and locked position.

== See also ==
- List of airports in Michigan
