= Livingston F.C. =

Association football club based in Livingston, Scotland

Coordinates: 55.8860°N 3.5222°W

Livingston
- Full name: Livingston Football Club
- Nicknames: Livi; The Lions
- Founded: 1943; 83 years ago (as Ferranti Thistle)
- Ground: Almondvale Stadium, Livingston
- Capacity: 9,713
- Owner: Calvin Ford
- Chairman: Calvin Ford
- Head coach: David Martindale; Frankie McAvoy (co-interim)
- League: Scottish Championship
- 2025–26: Scottish Premiership, 12th of 12 (relegated)
- Website: livingstonfc.co.uk
Home colours	Away colours

Livingston Football Club is a Scottish professional football club based in Livingston, West Lothian and currently plays in the Scottish Championship.

Livingston were founded in 1943 as Ferranti Thistle, a works team. The club was admitted to the Scottish Football League and renamed as Meadowbank Thistle in 1974, and played its matches at Meadowbank Stadium in Edinburgh. In 1995, the club was relocated to Livingston, West Lothian and renamed after the town. Since then Livingston have played their home games at Almondvale Stadium. In the ten years following the move to Livingston the club enjoyed notable success, winning promotion to the Scottish Premier League in 2001, qualifying for the UEFA Cup in its maiden season in the top flight (finishing third behind Celtic and Rangers) and winning the 2004 Scottish League Cup. However, the club hit financial problems in 2004, and was relegated to the Scottish First Division in 2006. In July 2009 the club faced further financial problems and were on the verge of suffering a liquidation event before a deal was struck. Livingston were subsequently demoted to the Scottish Third Division, but the club achieved consecutive promotions and went on to regain its place in the top tier after winning the 2017–18 Scottish Premiership play-offs.

== History ==
=== Ferranti Thistle (1943–1974) ===
The club began life as Ferranti Amateurs in 1943. A works team of the Ferranti engineering company, they initially played in the Edinburgh FA's Amateur Second Division. In 1948 the club became known as Ferranti Thistle and began competing in the Edinburgh and District Welfare Association where they competed for five seasons before moving to senior football in 1953, joining the East of Scotland League. During this period the club won the East of Scotland Qualifying Cup in 1963. In 1969 the club moved to the City Park ground in Edinburgh.

In 1972 the club became members of the Scottish Football Association, allowing them to enter the Scottish Qualifying Cup, which they won in 1973. The club's first match in the Scottish Cup was on 16 December 1972 against Duns.

In 1974, as a result of the demise of Third Lanark seven years earlier, and the new three-tier format of the Scottish Football League, a place opened up in the second division of the competition. After beating off competition from four Highland League sides as well as Hawick Royal Albert and Gateshead United, Ferranti Thistle were accepted into the league by a vote of 21–16 over Inverness Thistle. The club faced a number of obstacles before they could join the Division as their name did not meet stringent SFL rules on overt sponsorship of teams at the time and the City Ground was not up to standard. The local council offered use of Meadowbank Stadium, a modern stadium built in 1970. After an Edinburgh Evening News campaign to find a name for the club, the name Meadowbank Thistle was chosen. This was approved by the SFL in time for the new season.

=== Meadowbank Thistle (1974–1995) ===
Chart of yearly table positions of Livingston since joining the League.

Having had little time to form a team from the existing Ferranti squad, the first Meadowbank Thistle manager John Bain faced an uphill task to produce a competitive outfit in time for the new season. Meadowbank played their first competitive match in the League Cup, losing 1–0 to Albion Rovers. In 1983 the club achieved promotion to the First Division but were relegated back to the Second Division at the end of the 1984–85 season.

In the 1986–87 season, Meadowbank won the Second Division championship and promotion to the First Division. They finished runners-up in the First Division in the following season, but were denied promotion to the Premier Division due to league reconstruction.

The part-time club began to struggle despite becoming a limited company in 1993 and was relegated at the end of the 1992–93 season to the Second Division. Meadowbank suffered a second relegation in 1994–95, finishing second bottom in the Second Division and dropped to the newly created Third Division. After this, Chairman Bill Hunter claimed Meadowbank had run into severe financial difficulties and were facing closure as a result. In the face of significant opposition from many Meadowbank fans, who objected to the dropping of the club name and the team moving from Edinburgh, in 1995 Meadowbank Thistle relocated to a new stadium in the new town of Livingston and changed name once more to Livingston Football Club.

=== Livingston (1995–) ===
==== Rise to prominence ====
In their first season as Livingston they were crowned champions of the Third Division for the 1995–96 season. Three years later, in 1998–99, they won promotion again as Second Division champions. Another promotion followed in 2000–01 when the club finished champions of First Division and gained promotion to the Scottish Premier League (SPL), just six seasons after the relocation to Livingston. Livingston's first SPL campaign, 2001–02, brought more success as they finished third in the league (behind the Old Firm) and qualified for the UEFA Cup for the first time. Jim Leishman's side gave a competent showing in Europe. After disposing of FC Vaduz of Liechtenstein on the away goals rule after a 1–1 draw, they came up against SK Sturm Graz of Austria. A 14-goal, two-leg affair meant they missed out on the second round, being on the wrong side of an 8–6 aggregate scoreline. The club avoided relegation the following season, finishing 9th. That summer, manager Jim Leishman became the club's director of football and was replaced by Brazilian manager Márcio Máximo, who resigned only a few months into the following campaign and was in turn replaced by Leishman's former assistant Davie Hay. Under Hay's management, Livingston won their first national trophy in 2004 by winning the 2003–04 League Cup after a 2–0 win over Hibernian at Hampden Park. The goals in the final were scored by Derek Lilley and Jamie McAllister.

==== Administration and SPL relegation ====
The club's rise was short-lived as they were plunged into administration on 3 February 2004. It was 13 May 2005 before Livingston emerged from administration, following a period of financial turmoil in which the previous boardroom occupants were ousted to make way for Pearse Flynn's Lionheart Consortium. Flynn's first decision was to sack Davie Hay, stating that he wanted a younger man in charge, appointing Allan Preston as the club's new manager. While Preston's term as Livingston manager started brightly with a 3–0 win over newly promoted Inverness Caledonian Thistle, the club failed to win another league game under his management, resulting in his dismissal in November with the club rooted to the bottom of the SPL. Richard Gough succeeded Preston and steered the club to survival on the last day of the season with a 1–1 draw with Dundee that relegated Dundee in their place. Gough however refused to stay as manager past the end of that season due to family problems and returned to the US, and Paul Lambert succeeded him. On 11 February 2006, Lambert resigned as Livingston manager after seven straight defeats left Livingston bottom of the Scottish Premier League. He was replaced by John Robertson. Despite his best efforts, Livingston were relegated for the first time in May 2006 after only picking up 18 points that season. It was the worst record since the SPL began and was only beaten during the 2007–08 season by Gretna, after they were deducted 10 points for going into administration.

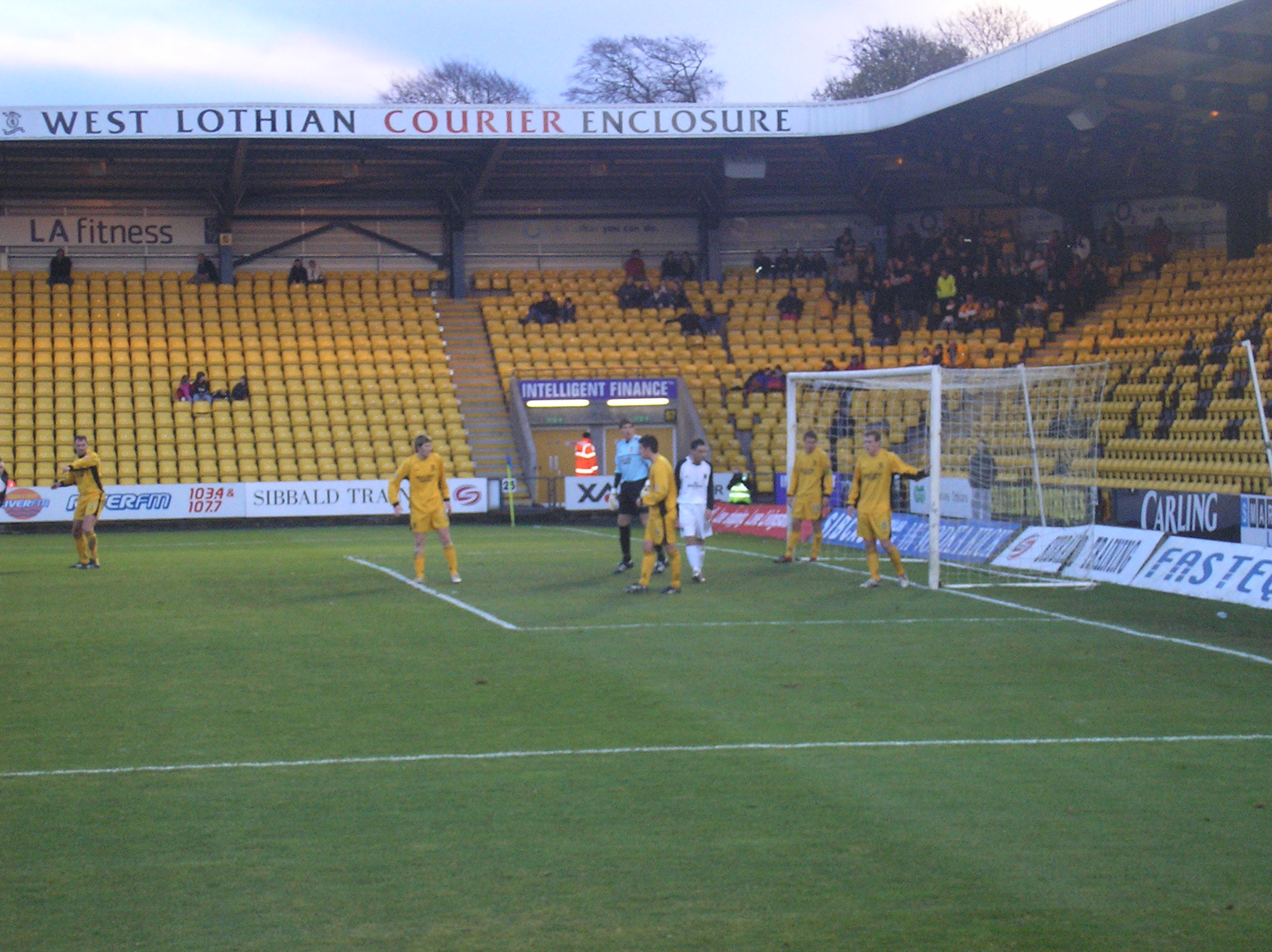
Livingston defend a corner from the now defunct Gretna at Almondvale Stadium in 2007.

==== First Division and second administration ====
A poor showing in the 2006–07 First Division saw John Robertson removed as Livingston manager on 15 April 2007. His successor was announced on 22 May 2007 as former Hibernian assistant coach Mark Proctor. Proctor appointed Curtis Fleming as his assistant on 26 June 2007, but both were sacked in June 2008 after a disappointing season in which the club finished seventh. Livingston were taken over that summer by Italian majority shareholders Angelo Massone, Tommaso Bruno, Alessandro Di Mattia and Tommaso Angelini after Pearse Flynn sold his shares in June 2008. The Italians were thought to be close to appointing fellow Italian Roberto Landi as head coach in June and he was made manager of the First Division side on 11 June 2008. He and assistant Valter Berlini were then fired on 1 December 2008 after just five months in charge. Paul Hegarty was linked with the job on 3 December 2008, and formally appointed two days later. Hegarty was subsequently suspended as manager on 26 April 2009 and his contract allowed to expire.

John Murphy was appointed head coach on 30 June 2009, the same day the club faced a deadline to pay debt to West Lothian Council who owned Almondvale Stadium. After that was not met, legal proceedings were carried out against the club to come to an arrangement over the debt within fourteen days or potentially face again going into administration. Livingston were placed into administration on 24 July 2009 by the Court of Session in Edinburgh, and faced relegation to the Third Division, a points deduction or being removed from the Scottish Football League entirely. On 27 July 2009, it was revealed that the club were likely to go into liquidation after owner Angelo Massone said he would refuse a £25,000 offer for the club from their administrator. On 28 July 2009, Massone yet again refused the offer and the administrator subsequently started the liquidation process. While Livingston seemed doomed, a meeting with the Scottish Football League on 30 July 2009 secured their future, as they agreed to allow prospective new owners Gordon McDougall and Neil Rankine (part of the Livingston 5 Consortium) to run the club for the following season. The next day, Massone sold his shares to the new owners and left the club, and it was also announced that John Murphy had been appointed back to his previous role as goalkeeping coach, with ex-player Gary Bollan becoming the club's new manager. In the first game after the new owners took over, Livingston were on the wrong end of a cup shock in the Scottish League Cup first round, losing 3–0 to Albion Rovers, a team two divisions below them.

==== Demotion to the Third Division ====
Despite the prospective new owners ensuring that Livingston's future as a professional football club would be secure for the next year at least by paying a £720,000 bond to the SFL, on 5 August 2009 the Scottish Football League took the unprecedented move to demote Livingston to the Third Division. A breach of rules on insolvency was the main reason behind the decision. The administrator of the club, Donald McGruther, admitted his concern after the decision, saying that "In my view, this represents the death knell of Livingston Football Club". Gordon McDougall, a member of the Livingston 5 Consortium stated that "We've got to consider all the options that are open to us – it makes it very, very difficult". It was feared that the club could not survive in the Third Division due to a significant loss of revenue. However, despite the decision and the likely financial impacts, the consortium continued with their bid to take over the club. An appeal was lodged and as a result the club refused to play their opening Division Three fixture against East Stirlingshire on 8 August 2009. Because of this, the club were threatened with a points deduction, but in the event they were given a £3,000 fine for their actions. This was later overturned on appeal, meaning that the club ultimately escaped any punishment for their boycott of the match. On 7 September 2009 a further appeal to the SFA was dismissed, and the club finally accepted their Third Division fate.

==== Title wins and First Division return ====
On 15 August 2009, Livingston opened their Third Division campaign against Montrose at home and ran out comfortable 2–0 winners. On 17 April 2010, Livingston won the Scottish Third Division title after drawing 0–0 at home to Berwick Rangers. Goalkeeper Roddy McKenzie saved a last minute penalty to ensure the title was on its way to Almondvale. The Lions ended the season on 78 points, 15 points ahead of second placed Forfar Athletic. The following season, on 9 April 2011, Livingston secured the Second Division title to earn a second consecutive promotion with a 3–0 victory over Stenhousemuir at Ochilview Park. On 9 February 2012, Bollan was sacked as manager after two and a half years in charge. Nine days later on 14 February 2012, John Hughes and John Collins were appointed as manager and director of football respectively. However, on 13 November 2012, it was announced that Hughes had left the club to take charge of Hartlepool United. Gareth Evans became manager after being promoted from his position as assistant manager but he was sacked on 28 February 2013 due to ‘concerns over his stewardship’. Collins subsequently resigned from his position as director of football. On 25 March 2013, Richie Burke was appointed as manager with Mark Burchill as assistant manager. Livingston ended season 2012–13 with a 4th-place finish in the First Division, their highest league finish since they were relegated from the SPL in 2006. On 12 September 2013, Burke resigned from his post as manager and was subsequently replaced by John McGlynn. When McGlynn took over Livingston were bottom of the Scottish Championship with only 1 point. Improved performances under his leadership took the club into contention for the promotion play-offs. As a result, he was awarded an extended contract in January 2014. Livingston eventually finished in 6th place in 2013–14.

However the club struggled the following season and were in severe danger of relegation. McGlynn left Livingston by mutual consent in December 2014, following a 1–0 home defeat by Falkirk, which left the club bottom of the league, four points behind second bottom Cowdenbeath. Mark Burchill replaced McGlynn as manager. Off the field problems also once again plagued the club during this season. The club were deducted 5 points by the SPFL for failing to pay tax on bonuses paid during the 2010–11 season. Former club director Ged Nixon tried to get the courts to freeze the clubs bank accounts as he claimed the club owed him £300,000. This sparked fears that Livingston would go into administration for a third time. Nixon lost his court case in April 2015, saving the club from this fate. Livingston won the 2014–15 Scottish Challenge Cup, defeating Alloa 4–0 in the final at McDiarmid Park. With two games of the season remaining Livingston were still adrift at the bottom of the league, three points behind relegation rivals Alloa and four behind Cowdenbeath. A 4–0 win away at Raith Rovers moved the club into 9th place on goal difference going into the final game of the season. Livingston won their final game of the season 1–0 at home to Queen of the South to pull off the great escape and finish in 8th place, avoiding both automatic relegation and the relegation play-off.

Livingston struggled against relegation again in season 2015–16. Burchill was sacked in December 2015 following a 1–1 draw with Dumbarton as Livingston sat second bottom of the league. David Hopkin replaced him as manager. However, there was to be no great escape this season. Livingston finished in 9th place in the Championship, which meant they had to contest the Championship play-off to avoid relegation to Scottish League One. They faced Stranraer in the play-off semi-final. Livingston lost the first leg 5–2 away at Stranraer, giving themselves a very difficult task for the second leg. In the second leg Livingston won 4–1 in 90 minutes to take the tie to extra time. However two extra time Stranraer goals took the score to 4–3 on the day and 6–8 on aggregate, confirming Livingston's relegation to League One, ending a five-year stint in the second tier.

==== League One and consecutive promotions ====
Despite relegation, Livingston decided to stay as a full-time football club, and David Hopkin was retained as manager for the 2016–17 season, as Livingston aimed to bounce back to the Championship. Livingston went on to win the league comfortably and secured the title in April 2017 following a 2–1 win at home to Alloa Athletic. Livingston finished 19 points clear at the top of the league.

Livingston continued this impressive form into the Championship in 2017–18 and sat in the play-off places in joint 3rd in the league after 20 games. The club also reached the quarter-finals of the Scottish League Cup, where they were unlucky to go down 3–2 at Hibernian. It was the first time they reached this stage of the League Cup since 2005–06.

On 21 April 2018 Livingston secured second place in the Championship after a 3–0 win over already relegated Brechin City.

Qualifying for the Premiership play-off final, they faced Partick Thistle, who escaped automatic relegation in their final game. Despite this, Livingston won 3–1 on aggregate, 2–1 at home and 1–0 away, earning the final place in the Scottish Premiership and their first season of top-flight football since 2006, relegating Partick Thistle to the Championship in the process, ending Thistle's five-year stint in the Premiership.

==== Return to the Top Flight ====
Livingston retained their status as a top flight club in season 2018–19 with a 9th-place finish. This was bettered the following season with the club sitting in 5th before the season was curtailed as a result of COVID-19. The points per game ruling confirmed this placing as Livi's first top 6 finish since 2001–02. In 2020–21, the feat was repeated with a sixth-place finish. The season was also notable for the club reaching the Scottish League Cup final for the first time since 2004.

== Colours and badge ==
The predominant club colours are amber and black, which have been used since the formation of the club in 1943. The strip typically has an amber top, with the shorts normally black and the socks amber, usually with some black detail. The original strip for the club during the first couple of seasons in the Ferranti Thistle era was amber and black hoops. After this, solid amber shirts, black shorts and amber socks (occasionally black) became established as the club's home kit. During the recent Livingston era the club have also used all black home strips, and a white and orange kit was used during 2002–03 season. The colours of white, black, purple, blue and red have been used as the away strip colour.

The badge used to identify the club has changed four times in the club's history. The Ferranti Thistle badge featured a black circular base. Three symbols were incorporated into the badge; a football, a thistle and a lion rampant in the centre holding aloft a Scottish flag. A new badge was then designed as the club changed their name to Meadowbank Thistle. The badge was based on a traditional shield shape with black being the predominant colour and amber on the outer-trim. The badge featured a thistle as the centre piece, with the flower part of the plant being replaced with a football. As the club moved to Livingston, the badge was changed again. The design of the thistle and the football was altered slightly, with the one major change being the addition of a Latin club motto "Fortitier omnia vincit", the English translation being "Bravely conquers all". The current badge is modernised from the original Livingston badge but most of the features remain. The present badge also reintroduced the lion rampant in the centre of the laurel.

== Sponsorship ==
Period	Kit manufacturer	Shirt sponsor
1995–1998	Russell Athletic	Mitsubishi
1998–2001	Russell Athletic	Motorola
2001–2002	Jerzeez	Motorola
2002–2004	Jerzeez	Intelligent Finance
2004–2007	Xara	Intelligent Finance
2007–2008	Nike	Smarter Loans
2008–2009	Macron	RDF Group
2009–2010	Umbro	Fasteq
2010–2011	Erreà	Fasteq
2011–2012	Umbro	Fasteq
2012–2013	Adidas	Fasteq
2013–2014	Adidas	Energy Assets
2014–2015	Joma	Energy Assets
2015–2016	Joma	Krafty Brew
2016–2017	Joma	Tony Macaroni
2017–2018	FBT	Tony Macaroni
2018–2019	FBT	Tony Macaroni
2019–2020	Nike	Phoenix Drilling
2020–2021	Nike	Phoenix Drilling
2021–2023	Joma	Phoenix Drilling
2023–2024	Joma	Emtez
2024–	Joma	Livi Self Storage

In the Meadowbank Thistle era between 1973 and 1995, the club sourced various shirt sponsorship deals largely from small businesses such as Ferranti, Sports Conscious, Park & Milton, Raj Restaurant, ACA and PAR Scaffolding. Mitsubishi became the first major shirt sponsor of the club for the first three seasons of the Livingston era. Motorola then sponsored the club for the next four years. However, Motorola withdrew their shirt sponsorship at the end of the 2001–02 season, after the company's decline in the area. In 2002, Intelligent Finance, one of the largest employers in the West Lothian area, agreed an initial two-year sponsorship deal with the club worth an undisclosed six-figure sum. The company extended their shirt sponsorship for three more years, making their total sponsorship span over a five-year period.

Smarter Loans became the club's main sponsor during the 2007–08 season, before the IT company, RDF, signed a two-year deal to become main sponsors for seasons 2008–09 and 2009–10. However they withdrew their sponsorship after only one year, as a result of the ongoing financial crisis at the club that summer. Local company Fasteq became the new main sponsor for season 2009–10 after the arrival of the new club owners. After four successful years as sponsors, Fasteq withdrew their sponsorship and Livingston announced that they were looking for new shirt sponsors for season 2013–14. Local business Energy Assets were confirmed as new main sponsors on a three-year deal in June 2013.

== Stadiums ==
The club have had three main grounds in their history; as Ferranti Thistle, the club initially played in local parks before finding a home at City Park in Edinburgh in 1969, then moving to Meadowbank Stadium in 1974 which was built for the 1970 Commonwealth Games.

Livingston currently play their home games at the Almondvale Stadium in Livingston. It is currently known as The Home of the Set Fare Arena due to a sponsorship deal. The 9,713 capacity stadium was constructed in 1995 as a joint venture between Meadowbank Thistle and the Livingston Development Corporation (LDC). Part of the deal involved the relocation of Meadowbank Thistle to the town and a name change to Livingston. When the LDC was wound up, ownership of the Stadium was transferred to West Lothian Council and the council have since rented the stadium to the club. The ground has hosted Scotland under-21, under-19, under-17s and Ladies matches, as well as one home game for Gretna due to problems with their ground share at Fir Park. In April 2011 it was revealed that it was possible Livingston would relocate to a new stadium around one mile from the current site due to West Lothian Council looking to sell the current site to a supermarket chain.

== Players ==
=== First-team squad ===
As of 1 September 2026

Note: Flags indicate national team as defined under FIFA eligibility rules; some limited exceptions apply. Players may hold more than one non-FIFA nationality.

No.	Pos.	Nation	Player
2	DF	SCO	Cammy Kerr
3	DF	GBS	Babacar Fati
4	DF	SCO	Jack Wilkie
5	DF	AUS	Ryan McGowan (captain)
6	MF	SCO	Aidan Denholm
7	MF	ENG	Tyrese Sinclair
8	MF	SCO	Scott Pittman
9	FW	SCO	Robbie Muirhead
10	FW	SCO	Sam Nicholson
11	MF	SCO	Connor McLennan
14	GK	SCO	Jack Hamilton
15	MF	SCO	Cammy MacPherson
16	MF	NIR	Cammy Palmer
17	FW	SCO	Stevie May

No.	Pos.	Nation	Player
19	MF	NED	Bradly van Hoeven
20	MF	GHA	Emmanuel Danso
21	DF	MKD	Besir Iseni
22	DF	IRL	Jordan Doherty
23	DF	FRA	Brooklyn Kabongolo
24	DF	SCO	Adam Montgomery (on loan from Celtic)
25	FW	SCO	Bruce Anderson
26	MF	COL	Cristian Montaño
27	MF	IRL	Graham Carey
28	GK	FRA	Jérôme Prior
30	DF	IRL	Shane Blaney
34	FW	SCO	Lewis Campbell
39	MF	SCO	Liam Polworth

=== On loan ===
Note: Flags indicate national team as defined under FIFA eligibility rules; some limited exceptions apply. Players may hold more than one non-FIFA nationality.

No.	Pos.	Nation	Player
12	DF	SCO	Mitchell Robertson (on loan at East Kilbride)
29	FW	CUW	Joshua Zimmerman (on loan at FK Voždovac)
31	FW	ENG	Joe Boggan (on loan at Chester)
33	MF	SCO	Ellis Stevenson (on loan at Pumpherston)

No.	Pos.	Nation	Player
35	GK	SCO	Evan Myles (on loan at Pumpherston)
36	FW	SCO	Sam Culbert (on loan at East Kilbride)
37	MF	SCO	Alan Tabol (on loan at Pumpherston)

=== Notable players ===
For a complete list of former and current Livingston F.C. players with a Wikipedia article, see here.

Players who reached full international status:

- (Scotland) Neil Alexander
- (Nigeria) Efe Ambrose
- (Spain) Guillermo Amor
- (Trinidad and Tobago) Marvin Andrews
- (Canada) Scott Arfield
- (Republic of the Congo) Dylan Bahamboula
- (Republic of the Congo) Scott Bitsindou
- (Democratic Republic of the Congo) Jeremy Bokila
- (Northern Ireland) Ciaron Brown
- (Scotland) Mark Burchill
- (Ivory Coast) Eugène Dadi
- (Scotland) Murray Davidson
- (Scotland) Graham Dorrans
- (Scotland) Rab Douglas
- (Scotland) Lyndon Dykes
- (Guinea-Bissau) Babacar Fati
- (Scotland) Declan Gallagher
- (Guinea-Bissau) Esmaël Gonçalves
- (Northern Ireland) Danny Griffin
- (Scotland) Leigh Griffiths
- (Republic of Ireland) Wes Hoolahan
- (Scotland) Darren Jackson
- (Morocco) Hassan Kachloul
- (Scotland) Brian Kerr
- (Scotland) Paul Lambert
- (Togo) Steve Lawson
- (Poland) Mariusz Liberda
- (Australia) Stuart Lovell
- (Dominican Republic) Luiyi de Lucas
- (Togo) Chérif Touré Mamam
- (Scotland) Stevie May
- (Scotland) Jamie McAllister
- (Northern Ireland) Grant McCann
- (Australia) Ryan McGowan
- (Scotland) David McNamee
- (Scotland) Marc McNulty
- (Northern Ireland) James McPake
- (Angola) Dolly Menga
- (Scotland) Kenny Miller
- (Scotland) Lee Miller
- (Saint Kitts and Nevis) Michael Nottingham
- (Saint Kitts and Nevis) Harry Panayiotou
- (Finland) Marko Rajamäki
- (Scotland) John Robertson
- (Scotland) Maurice Ross
- (Liberia) Mohammed Sangare
- (Montenegro) Matija Sarkic
- (Scotland) Steven Saunders
- (Scotland) Andrew Shinnie
- (Scotland) Robert Snodgrass
- (North Macedonia) Goran Stanić
- (Republic of Ireland) Anthony Stokes
- (Estonia) Alex Tamm
- (Hungary) Gábor Vincze
- (Jamaica) Theodore Whitmore
- (Scotland) Danny Wilson
- (Scotland) Robbie Winters
- (Canada) Davide Xausa
- (Australia) Tete Yengi
- (Curaçao) Joshua Zimmerman

== Club staff ==
=== Coaching staff ===
Role	Name
Interim head coaches	(Scotland) David Martindale (Scotland) Frankie McAvoy
First team coaches	(Scotland) Grant Murray (Scotland) John Potter
Goalkeeping coach	(Scotland) Brian Potter
Sporting director	(Scotland) David Martindale
Head of football operations	(Scotland) Brian Rice
Head of academy	(Scotland) George Cairns
Performance analyst	Conor Flanagan
Recruitment data analyst	Tom Irving
Head of medical	Andy MacKenzie
Physiotherapist	Niamh Duddy
Strength and conditioning coach	Alex Headrick
Kit manager	Stephen Sproule

=== Former non-playing staff ===
For a complete list of former and current Livingston F.C. non-playing staff with a Wikipedia article, see Category:Livingston F.C. non-playing staff.

=== Executive ===
Role	Name
Chairman	Calvin Ford
Vice-chairman	Neil Hogarth
Director	Niall Hay
Chief executive officer	John Ward
Chief operations officer	Dave Black
Football operations manager and media officer	Jen Dodds
Club secretary	Scott Struthers
Honorary president	Gordon Ford

== Managerial history ==
Name	Nationality	Years
John Bain¹	(Scotland)	1974–1975
Alex Ness¹	(Scotland)	1976–1977
Willie MacFarlane¹	(Scotland)	1977–1980
Terry Christie¹	(Scotland)	1980–1992
Donald Park¹	(Scotland)	1992–1994
John Brownlie¹	(Scotland)	1994
Mickey Lawson¹	(Scotland)	1994–1995
Jim Leishman	(Scotland)	1995–1997
Ray Stewart	(Scotland)	1997–2000
Jim Leishman	(Scotland)	2000–2003
Márcio Máximo	(Brazil)	2003
David Hay	(Scotland)	2003–2004
Allan Preston	(Scotland)	2004
Alec Cleland^{c}	(Scotland)	2004
Richard Gough	(Scotland)	2004–2005
Paul Lambert	(Scotland)	2005–2006
Alec Cleland^{c}	(Scotland)	2006
John Robertson	(Scotland)	2006–2007
Alec Cleland & Dave Bowman^{c}	(Scotland)	2007

Name	Nationality	Years
Mark Proctor	(England)	2007–2008
Roberto Landi	(Italy)	2008
Paul Hegarty	(Scotland)	2008–2009
David Hay^{c}	(Scotland)	2009
John Murphy	(United States)	2009
Gary Bollan	(Scotland)	2009–2012
Brian Welsh^{c}	(Scotland)	2012
John Hughes	(Scotland)	2012
Gareth Evans	(England)	2012–2013
Richie Burke	(England)	2013
John McGlynn	(Scotland)	2013–2014
Mark Burchill	(Scotland)	2014–2015
David Hopkin	(Scotland)	2015–2018
Kenny Miller^{p}	(Scotland)	2018
Gary Holt	(Scotland)	2018–2020
David Martindale	(Scotland)	2020–2026
Marvin Bartley	(England)	2026
Scott Arfield^{c}^{p}	(Canada)	2026
Glenn Whelan	(Republic of Ireland)	2026

¹ Managers between 1974 and 1995, when the club were known as Meadowbank Thistle.

^{c} Caretaker managers.

^{p} Player managers.

== Honours ==
From major national honours to reserve league wins, Livingston have been successful in recent history, and were the first club in Scotland to win all three divisions (Third Division 1995–96, Second Division 1998–99 and First Division 2000–01) in their rise to the Scottish Premier League in 2001. Their most notable trophy win being the Scottish League Cup in 2004, where they triumphed in a 2–0 victory over Hibernian at Hampden Park just six weeks after entering administration. Their most recent honour was the Scottish Challenge Cup in season 2024–25.

In 2015 Livingston lifted the Scottish Challenge Cup recording a 4–0 victory over Alloa Athletic at McDiarmid Park.

=== Senior ===
- Scottish League Cup: 2003–04
  - Runners-up: 2020–21
- Scottish First Division (2nd tier): 2000–01
- Scottish Second Division/League One (3rd tier): 1986–87¹, 1998–99, 2010–11, 2016–17
- Scottish Third Division (4th tier): 1995–96, 2009–10
- Scottish Challenge Cup: 2014–15, 2024–25
  - Runners-up: 2000–01
- Scottish Qualifying Cup (South): 1973–74²

=== Reserve ===
- Reserve League Cup: 1998–99, 2000–01
- Reserve League West: 2000–01
- SPFL Reserve League 2: 2018–19, 2019–20

=== Youth ===
- SFL Under 19 Youth Division: 2007–08, 2008–09, 2009–10, 2010–11
- SFL Under 19 Youth League Cup: 2008–09
- SFL Under 17 Division: 2011–12
- SFL Under 17 Youth League Cup: 2010–11

¹ This includes honours won between 1974 and 1995, when the club were known as Meadowbank Thistle.

² This includes honours won between 1943 and 1974, when the club were known as Ferranti Thistle.

== Club records ==
- Record victory: 8–0 v Stranraer, 4 August 2012; 8–0 v Forfar Athletic, 21 July 2026
- Record home victory: 7–1 v Clyde, 14 December 2009
- Record defeat: 0–8 v Hamilton Academical, 14 December 1974
- Record defeat as Livingston: 0–7 v Hibernian, 8 February 2006
- Most consecutive wins (Livingston era): 9 – 2016–17
- Most appearances (Meadowbank era): Walter Boyd, 523
- Most consecutive appearances (Meadowbank era): Walter Boyd, 255
- Most appearances (Livingston era): Scott Pittman (372)
- Most goals in a season (player): 27 – Liam Buchanan (2016–17)
- Most goals in a season (team): 80 – (2016–17)
- Most points in a season: 82 – (2010–11)
- Record home attendance: 10,112 v Rangers, 27 October 2001
- Record transfer fee paid: £200,000 for Lyndon Dykes (Queen of the South, 2019)
- Record transfer fee received: £2,000,000 for Lyndon Dykes (Queens Park Rangers, 2020)

== European record ==
Livingston are undefeated at home in European competitions. They have qualified for a UEFA club competition on one occasion. The club finished third in the Scottish Premier League (behind Celtic and Rangers) in season 2001–02 and hence qualified for a place in the UEFA Cup for the following season. They entered at the qualifying round stage and were drawn against FC Vaduz of Liechtenstein. Livingston narrowly overcame their opponents after drawing 1–1 on aggregate, going through to the next round on the away goals rule. After drawing the home leg 0–0 Óscar Rubio scored the decisive away goal. In the following round they were drawn against Austrian side SK Sturm Graz. They were defeated 8–6 on aggregate, losing the first leg 5–2 in Austria at the Arnold Schwarzenegger Stadium before winning the return leg 4–3 at Almondvale. Barry Wilson scored two goals against Sturm Graz, making him Livingston's highest goalscorer in European competitions to date.

Season	Competition	Round	Opponent	Home	Away	Aggregate
2002–03	UEFA Cup	Qualifying round	(Liechtenstein) FC Vaduz	0–0	1–1	1–1 (a)
2002–03	UEFA Cup	First round	(Austria) SK Sturm Graz	4–3	2–5	6–8

== See also ==
- Livingston F.C. B Team and Academy
- Relocation of professional sports teams
- Works team
