= 2026–27 Inverness Caledonian Thistle F.C. season =

Scottish football club season

Inverness Caledonian Thistle
2026–27 season
- Chairman: Alan Savage
- Manager: Scott Kellacher
- Stadium: Caledonian Stadium (Capacity: 7,512)
- Championship: 6th
- Scottish Cup: Third round
- League Cup: Round of 16; Lost 6–2 to Heart of Midlothian
- Challenge Cup: Third round
- Highest home attendance: 3,154; vs. Dunfermline Athletic, 1 August 2026

The 2026–27 Inverness Caledonian Thistle season is the club's 33rd season in the Scottish Professional Football League (SPFL) and the club's first back in the Scottish Championship, following their promotion from Scottish League One in the previous season.

== Fixtures ==
=== Friendlies ===
23 June 2026 Friendly	Nairn County	1 – 3	Inverness Caledonian Thistle	Nairn
19:30	C. MacKay 40'		Trialist 18', Allan 21', Longstaff 63'	Stadium: Station Park

27 June 2026 Friendly	Clachnacuddin	1 – 3	Inverness Caledonian Thistle	Inverness
13:00	Mackenzie 51'		Allan 12', Trialist 82', Keogh 85'	Stadium: Grant Street Park

30 June 2026 Friendly	Inverness Caledonian Thistle	1 – 0	The New Saints	Glasgow
				Attendance: Behind Closed Doors

4 July 2026 Friendly	Inverness Caledonian Thistle	0 – 4	Ross County	Inverness
13:00			Chin 35', Lindsay 50', Emslie 52', Phillips 84'	Stadium: Grant Street Park

7 July 2026 Friendly	Cove Rangers	1 – 4	Inverness Caledonian Thistle	Aberdeen
19:00	Oladipo 22'		Trialist 10', Duncan 48', Bates 64', Kargbo 86'	Stadium: Balmoral Stadium

14 July 2026 Friendly	Strathspey Thistle	0 – 6	Inverness Caledonian Thistle	Grantown-on-Spey
19:45			Keogh 10', Mackinnon 21', Kargbo 31', Bates 35' (pen.), 59' Thompson 75'	Stadium: Seafield Park

=== Championship ===
1 August 2026 1	Inverness Caledonian Thistle	0 – 0	Dunfermline Athletic	Inverness
15:00		Report		Stadium: Caledonian Stadium; Attendance: 3,154

8 August 2026 2	Arbroath	0 – 0	Inverness Caledonian Thistle	Arbroath
15:00		Report		Stadium: Gayfield Park; Attendance: 1,381

21 August 2026 3	Inverness Caledonian Thistle	1 – 1	Partick Thistle	Inverness
19:30	Bavidge 89'	Report	Drozd 17'	Stadium: Caledonian Stadium; Attendance: 2,809

29 August 2026 4	Stenhousemuir	3 – 1	Inverness Caledonian Thistle	Stenhousemuir
15:00	O'Donnell 23', 50', Young 57'	Report	Sole 52'	Stadium: Ochilview Park; Attendance: 650

5 September 2026 5	Inverness Caledonian Thistle	0 – 2	Raith Rovers	Inverness
15:00		Report	Robertson 13', Rowe 86'	Stadium: Caledonian Stadium; Attendance: 2,776

12 September 2026 6	Ayr United	1 – 3	Inverness Caledonian Thistle	Ayr
15:00	Stirton 28'	Report	Longstaff 4', Duncan 17', Mackinnon 72'	Stadium: Somerset Park; Attendance: 1,844

19 September 2026 7	Livingston	2 – 2	Inverness Caledonian Thistle	Livingston
15:00	Kabongolo 24', Muirhead 79'	Report	L. Stewart 58', Bavidge 75'	Stadium: Almondvale Stadium; Attendance: 1,746

25 September 2026 8	Inverness Caledonian Thistle	2 – 0	Greenock Morton	Inverness
19:45	Allan 26', Bavidge 66'	Report		Stadium: Caledonian Stadium; Attendance: 2,207

10 October 2026 9	Inverness Caledonian Thistle	2 – 0	Stenhousemuir	Inverness
15:00	Mackinnon 26', Macleod 35'	Report		Stadium: Caledonian Stadium; Attendance: 2,425

13 October 2026 10	Queen's Park	2 – 1	Inverness Caledonian Thistle	Glasgow
19:45	Connolly 18', 41'	Report	Shinnie 6'	Stadium: Lesser Hampden; Attendance: 787

17 October 2026 11	Inverness Caledonian Thistle	2 – 0	Arbroath	Inverness
15:00	MacLeod 38', Bavidge 42'	Report		Stadium: Caledonian Stadium; Attendance: 2,351

24 October 2026 12	Raith Rovers	0 – 2	Inverness Caledonian Thistle	Kirkcaldy
15:00		Report	A.Stewart 14', 37'	Stadium: Starks Park; Attendance: 2,909

31 October 2026 13	Dunfermline Athletic	5 – 1	Inverness Caledonian Thistle	Dunfermline
15:00	Amade 47', Shaw 54', 63', Abdulai 68', Corbally 78'	Report	Bavidge (pen.), 11'	Stadium: East End Park; Attendance: 5,415

7 November 2026 14	Inverness Caledonian Thistle	1 – 1	Livingston	Inverness
15:00	A. Stewart 65'	Report	Montano 70'	Stadium: Caledonian Stadium; Attendance: 2,673

15 November 2026 15	Partick Thistle	3 – 2	Inverness Caledonian Thistle	Glasgow
15:00	Smyth (pen.), 39', (pen.), 44', Watt 61'	Report	Allan 84', MacGregor 85'	Stadium: Firhill Stadium; Attendance: 4,658

20 November 2026 16	Inverness Caledonian Thistle	0 – 0	Ayr United	Inverness
19:30		Report		Stadium: Caledonian Stadium; Attendance: 2,090
Note: Moved forward from 21 November for BBC Scotland coverage

5 December 2026 17	Greenock Morton	v	Inverness Caledonian Thistle	Greenock
15:00				Stadium: Cappielow Park

12 December 2026 18	Inverness Caledonian Thistle	v	Queen's Park	Inverness
15:00				Stadium: Caledonian Stadium

19 December 2026 19	Stenhousemuir	v	Inverness Caledonian Thistle	Stenhousemuir
15:00				Stadium: Ochilview Park

23 December 2026 20	Arbroath	v	Inverness Caledonian Thistle	Inverness
19:30				Stadium: Gayfield Park
Note: Game moved forward from 26 December

2 January 2027 21	Inverness Caledonian Thistle	v	Dunfermline Athletic	Inverness
15:00				Stadium: Caledonian Stadium

9 January 2027 22	Inverness Caledonian Thistle	v	Raith Rovers	Inverness
15:00				Stadium: Caledonian Stadium

=== Scottish Cup ===
Inverness will be drawn into the Third round of the Scottish Cup.

28 November 2026 Third round	Inverness Caledonian Thistle	v	Cove Rangers	Inverness
15:00				Stadium: Caledonian Stadium

=== League Cup ===
Inverness were drawn into Group F of the League Cup, alongside St Johnstone, Greenock Morton, East Fife, and Linlithgow Rose.

11 July 2026 Group Stage	Inverness Caledonian Thistle	1 – 1 (5 – 3 p)	East Fife	Inverness
15:00	Mackinnon 90+1'	Report	Gaffney 33'	Stadium: Caledonian Stadium; Attendance: 823; Referee: Sean Murdoch
	Penalties
	Shinnie (penalty scored); Wotherspoon (penalty scored); Kargbo (penalty scored); Bates (penalty scored); Longstaff (penalty scored)		(penalty scored) Peggie; (penalty missed) Skeen-Hamilton; (penalty scored) Slattery; (penalty scored) Wilson

18 July 2026 Group Stage	Linlithgow Rose	0 – 2	Inverness Caledonian Thistle	Linlithgow
15:00		Report	Duncan 17'; Boutin 38'	Stadium: Prestonfield; Attendance: 747; Referee: Iain Snedden

21 July 2026 Group Stage	Inverness Caledonian Thistle	1 – 0	St Johnstone	Inverness
19:45	Stewart 16'	Report		Stadium: Caledonian Stadium; Attendance: 1,253; Referee: Cameron Stirling

25 July 2026 Group Stage	Greenock Morton	0 – 1	Inverness Caledonian Thistle	Greenock
15:00		Report	Bavidge 14' (pen.)	Stadium: Cappielow Park; Attendance: 864; Referee: Ross Hardie

16 August 2026 Round of 16	Heart of Midlothian	6 – 2	Inverness Caledonian Thistle	Edinburgh
14:00	Borchgrevink 16', Mato 59', Miller (pen.), 83', 90+4'; Wilson 84', Braga 90+1'	Report	Duncan 54', Bavidge 56'	Stadium: Tynecastle Park; Attendance: 15,327; Referee: Calum Scott

=== Challenge Cup ===
Due to Inverness being promoted to the Championship, they will be drawn into the Second round with the other Championship sides, and bypassing the League Phase.

3 November 2026 Second round	Inverness Caledonian Thistle	1 – 0	Montrose	Inverness
19:45	A. Stewart 79'			Stadium: Caledonian Stadium; Attendance: 560

24/25 November 2026 Third round	Ayr United	v	Inverness Caledonian Thistle	Ayr
19:45				Stadium: Somerset Park

=== North of Scotland Cup ===
1 September 2026 First round	Inverness Caledonian Thistle XI	0 – 1	Strathspey Thistle	Grantown-on-Spey
19:30			Morrison 32'	Stadium: Seafield Park

== First team statistics ==
=== Current squad ===
No.	Name	Position	Nationality	Place of birth	Date of birth	Previous club	Date acquired	Fee	Contract expiry
Goalkeepers
	Logan Ross	GK	(Scotland)		24 April 2004	Ross County	17 June 2025	Free	31 May 2027
	Szymon Rebilas	GK	(Poland)			Academy	2 August 2024	Trainee	31 May 2028
	Ross Munro	GK	(Scotland)	Inverness	1 April 2000	Falkirk	17 June 2025	Free	31 May 2028
Defenders
	Danny Devine	CB	(Northern Ireland)	Belfast	7 September 1992	(Scotland) Dunfermline Athletic	17 August 2020	Free	31 May 2027
	Graeme Shinnie	LB	(Scotland)	Aberdeen	4 August 1991	(Scotland) Aberdeen	25 May 2026	Free	31 May 2028
	James Clark	RB	(Scotland)	Fort William		Academy	20 June 2025	Trainee	31 May 2027
Midfielders
	Shae Keogh	CM	(Scotland)	Inverness	11 April 2007	Academy	2 August 2024	Trainee	31 May 2028
	Ben Corner	CM	(Scotland)	Fort William	2007	Academy	2 August 2024	Trainee	31 May 2028
	Calum MacLeod	DM	(Scotland)	Inverness	25 May 2006	Academy	1 July 2023	Trainee	31 May 2027
	Sam Reid	CM	(England)			Academy		Trainee	31 May 2027
	Sam Thompson	CM	(Scotland)	Inverness		Academy	20 June 2025	Trainee	31 May 2027
	Paul Allan	CM	(Scotland)	Dunfermline	7 February 2000	(Scotland) Dunfermline Athletic	24 August 2024	Free	31 May 2027
Forwards
	Luis Longstaff	RW	(England)	Darlington	24 February 2001	(Scotland) Cove Rangers	20 July 2023	Free	31 May 2027

=== League goalscorers ===
As of match played 20 November vs. Ayr United

Rank	Player	Goals
1	(Scotland) Alfie Bavidge	5
2	(Scotland) Alfie Stewart	3
3	(Scotland) Adam Mackinnon	2
3	(Scotland) Paul Allan	2
3	(Scotland) Calum MacLeod	2
4	(England) Liam Sole	1
4	(England) Luis Longstaff	1
4	(Scotland) Ryan Duncan	1
4	(England) Layton Stewart	1
4	(Scotland) Roddy MacGregor	1
4	(Scotland) Graeme Shinnie	1

=== Overall goalscorers ===
Rank	Player	Goals
1	(Scotland) Alfie Bavidge	7
2	(Scotland) Alfie Stewart	5
3	(Scotland) Ryan Duncan	3
3	(Scotland) Adam Mackinnon	3
4	(Scotland) Calum MacLeod	2
4	(Scotland) Paul Allan	2
5	(France) Noa Boutin	1
5	(England) Liam Sole	1
5	(England) Luis Longstaff	1
5	(England) Layton Stewart	1
5	(Scotland) Roddy MacGregor	1
5	(Scotland) Graeme Shinnie	1

=== Hattricks ===
Player	Competition	Score	Opponent	Date

== Transfers ==
Transfers in
Player	Age*	Pos.	From	Fee	Date	Notes
(Scotland) Graeme Shinnie	34	DF	(Scotland) Aberdeen	Free	26 May 2026	
(England) Liam Sole	26	MF	(Scotland) Livingston	Free	9 June 2026	
(France) Noa Boutin	22	DF	(England) AFC Bournemouth	Free	16 June 2026	
(Scotland) Ellis Leighton	17	DF	Academy	Free	22 June 2026	
(Scotland) Jake Rodgers	17	CM	Academy	Free	22 June 2026	
(Scotland) Kenzie Harkness	17	CM	Academy	Free	22 June 2026	
(Scotland) Archie Kerr	17	DF	Academy	Free	22 June 2026	
(Scotland) Ryan Duncan	22	MF	(Scotland) Aberdeen	Free	3 July 2026	
(England) Hamzad Kargbo	24	FW	(England) Maidstone United	Free	4 July 2026	
(Scotland) Kerr Smith	21	DF	(England) Aston Villa	Free	17 July 2026	
(Scotland) Miller Keir	19	FW	(Scotland) Turriff United	£30,000	20 July 2026	
(Scotland) Roddy MacGregor	24	MF	(Scotland) Queen's Park	Free	29 July 2026	
(Scotland) Daniel MacKay	25	MF	(Scotland) Partick Thistle	Free	7 August 2026	
(England) Esapa Osong	24	FW	(England) Nottingham Forest	Free	17 September 2026	
(England) Layton Stewart	24	FW	(Switzerland) Thun	Free	18 September 2026	

Transfers out
Player	Age*	Pos.	To	Fee	Date	Notes
(Scotland) Robbie Thompson	22	MF	(Scotland) Strathspey Thistle	N/A	29 May 2026	
(Scotland) Jake Davidson	25	MF	Released	N/A	31 May 2026	
(Zambia) Chanka Zimba	24	FW	Released	N/A	31 May 2026	
(Scotland) Sam Nixon	19	DF	(Scotland) Brora Rangers	N/A	18 June 2026	
(Scotland) Ben Gardiner	18	FW	(Scotland) Brora Rangers	N/A	29 June 2026	
(Scotland) Ross Millen	31	DF	(Scotland) Raith Rovers	N/A	1 July 2026	Contract expired
(Scotland) Matthew Strachan	21	DF	(Scotland) Formartine United	N/A	10 July 2026	Contract expired
(Scotland) Jack Walker	20	DF	(Wales) Haverfordwest County	N/A	29 July 2026	Contract expired
(Scotland) Oscar MacIntyre	21	DF	(Scotland) Stenhousemuir	N/A	1 August 2026	Contract expired
(England) Hamzad Kargbo	24	FW	(Scotland) Stenhousemuir	N/A	4 September 2026	Mutual Consent

Loans in and returns
Player	Age*	Pos.	From	Duration	Date In	Date Out	Notes
(Scotland) Ben Corner	20	FW	(Scotland) Clachnacuddin	Returnee	31 May 2026	N/A	
(Scotland) Robbie Thompson	22	MF	(Scotland) Elgin City	Returnee	31 May 2026	N/A	
(Scotland) Sam Thompson	18	MF	(Scotland) Brora Rangers	Returnee	31 May 2026	N/A	
(Scotland) Sam Reid	18	FW	(Scotland) Forres Mechanics	Returnee	31 May 2026	N/A	
(Scotland) Jack Walker	20	DF	(Scotland) Buckie Thistle	Returnee	31 May 2026	N/A	
(Scotland) Matthew Strachan	20	DF	(Scotland) Forfar Athletic	Returnee	31 May 2026	N/A	
(Scotland) Jake Davidson	25	DF	(Scotland) The Spartans	Returnee	31 May 2026	N/A	
(Wales) Morgan Bates	19	FW	(Wales) Swansea City	Season	23 June 2026		
(Scotland) Alfie Bavidge	20	FW	(Scotland) Aberdeen	Season	26 June 2026		
(Scotland) Alfie Stewart	19	MF	(Scotland) Aberdeen	Season	7 July 2026		

Loans out and returns
Player	Age*	Pos.	To	Duration	Date Out	Date In	Notes
(England) Liam Sole	26	MF	(Scotland) Livingston	Return	31 May 2026	N/A	
(Scotland) Alfie Stewart	19	MF	(Scotland) Aberdeen	Return	31 May 2026	N/A	
(Scotland) Alfie Bavidge	20	FW	(Scotland) Aberdeen	Return	31 May 2026	N/A	
(Scotland) Mitchell Robertson	21	DF	(Scotland) Celtic	Return	31 May 2026	N/A	
(Scotland) Kieron Willox	20	FW	(England) Stoke City	Return	31 May 2026	N/A	
(Scotland) Jake Rodgers	17	MF	(Scotland) Brora Rangers	Half-Season	16 July 2026		Co-Operation Agreement
(Scotland) James Clark	18	DF	(Scotland) Brora Rangers	Half-Season	17 July 2026		Co-Operation Agreement
(Scotland) Archie Kerr	17	DF	(Scotland) Brora Rangers	Half-Season	17 July 2026		Co-Operation Agreement
(Scotland) Sam Thompson	19	MF	(Scotland) Clachnacuddin	Half-Season	24 July 2026	January 2027	
(Scotland) Kenzie Harkness	18	MF	(Scotland) Forres Mechanics	Half-Season	24 July 2026	January 2027	
(Scotland) Ellis Leighton	17	DF	(Scotland) Forres Mechanics	Half-Season	24 July 2026	January 2027	
(Scotland) Sam Reid	18	FW	(Scotland) Forres Mechanics	Half-Season	24 July 2026	January 2027	
(Scotland) Shae Keogh	19	MF	(Scotland) Clachnacuddin	Half-Season	14 August 2026	Jaunuary 2027	
(Scotland) Joe Chalmers	32	MF	(Scotland) Cove Rangers	Half-Season	21 August 2026	January 2027	
(Poland) Szymon Rebilas	18	GK	(Scotland) Rothes	Half-Season	26 August 2026	January 2027	
(Scotland) Miller Keir	19	FW	(Scotland) Cove Rangers	Half-Season	18 September 2026	January 2027	
