= 2025–26 Inverness Caledonian Thistle F.C. season =

Scottish football club season

Inverness Caledonian Thistle
2025–26 season
- Chairman: Scott Young
- Manager: Scott Kellacher
- Stadium: Caledonian Stadium (Capacity: 7,512)
- League One: 1st Champions
- Scottish Cup: Fourth Round; lost 4–2 on penalties to The Spartans
- League Cup: Group Stage
- Challenge Cup: Final; lost 4–1 to Raith Rovers
- Top goalscorer: League: Chanka Zimba (11 goals); All: Alfie Bavidge (20 goals)
- Highest home attendance: 5,029 vs. Hamilton Academical (2 May 2026)
- Lowest home attendance: 390 vs. Dundee United B (11 November 2025)
Home colours	Away colours

The 2025–26 Inverness Caledonian Thistle season was the club's 32nd season in the SPFL and the club's second consecutive in Scottish League One, following their relegation from the Championship in 2023–24. Due to the club entering administration the season prior, they started the league with a 5-point deduction. On 2 May 2026, Inverness lifted the League One title for the first time in their history.

== Fixtures ==
=== Friendlies ===
21 June 2025 Friendly	Strathspey Thistle	1 – 4	Inverness Caledonian Thistle XI	Grantown-on-Spey
14:00	Doran 65'		Gardiner 26' (pen.), Trialist 42', 45', S. Thompson 57'	Stadium: Seafield Park

25 June 2025 Friendly	Nairn County	0 – 0	Inverness Caledonian Thistle	Nairn
19:30				Stadium: Station Park

25 June 2025 Friendly	Rothes	2 – 3	Inverness Caledonian Thistle	Rothes
19:30	Duncan 24', Shepard 65'		Wotherspoon 37', S. Thompson 63', R. Thompson 68'	Stadium: Mackessack Park

28 June 2025 Friendly	Clachnacuddin	1 – 1	Inverness Caledonian Thistle	Inverness
13:00	Anderson 38'		Wotherspoon 5' (pen.)	Stadium: Grant Street Park

28 June 2025 Friendly	Forres Mechanics	4 – 0	Inverness Caledonian Thistle	Forres
13:00	? 33', Frame 39', Hayllar 86', McLauchlan 87'			Stadium: Mosset Park

1 July 2025 Friendly	Partick Thistle	3 – 2	Inverness Caledonian Thistle	Glasgow
19:00	Stanway 50', 53', L. Chalmers 51'		Trialist 9' 12'	Stadium: Petershill Park

4 July 2025 Friendly	Wick Academy	P – P	Inverness Caledonian Thistle XI	Wick
19:30				Stadium: Upper Bignold
Note: Postponed due to waterlogged pitch

5 July 2025 Aaron Doran Testimonial	Inverness Caledonian Thistle XI	0 – 2	Ross County XI	Inverness
14:00			Hale 7', 45'	Stadium: Caledonian Stadium; Attendance: 2,000

9 July 2025 Friendly	Banks o' Dee	1 – 3	Inverness Caledonian Thistle	Aberdeen
19:00	Hunter 78'		Wotherspoon 27', Allan 60' (pen.), 62'	Stadium: Spain Park

=== League ===
2 August 2025 1	Kelty Hearts	0 – 3	Inverness CT	Kelty
15:00		Report	Mckay 4', Longstaff 37', Wotherspoon 60'	Stadium: New Central Park; Attendance: 613

9 August 2025 2	Inverness CT	2 – 0	Peterhead	Caledonian Stadium
15:00	Wotherspoon 39', Sole 55'	Report		Attendance: 2,078

16 August 2025 3	Inverness CT	1 – 2	Stenhousemuir	Caledonian Stadium
15:00	Allan 22' (pen.)	Report	Aitken 35' (pen.), Taylor 81'	Attendance: 1,927

23 August 2025 4	Montrose	0 – 2	Inverness CT	Links Park
15:00		Report	Bavidge 4', MacLeod 33'	Attendance: 776

30 August 2025 5	Inverness CT	1 – 0	Alloa Athletic	Inverness
15:00	Sole 72'	Report		Stadium: Caledonian Stadium; Attendance: 2,116

13 September 2025 6	Cove Rangers	0 – 1	Inverness CT	Aberdeen
17:30		Report	MacLeod 66'	Stadium: Balmoral Stadium; Attendance: 456
Note: Fixture was originally scheduled for a 15:00 kick-off, but was moved for live BBC Alba broadcast.

20 September 2025 7	Queen of the South	0 – 2	Inverness CT	Palmerston Park
15:00		Report	Zimba 9', Longstaff 90+3'	Attendance: 1,114

27 September 2025 8	Inverness CT	4 – 1	East Fife	Caledonian Stadium
15:00	Wotherspoon 17', 62', Stewart 65', Bavidge 90+9'	Report	Austin 43'	Attendance: 2,316

4 October 2025 9	Hamilton Academical	3 – 1	Inverness CT	Broadwood Stadium
15:00	O'Hara 22', Macdonald 64', Shaw 90+2'	Report	Bavidge 63'	Attendance: 384

18 October 2025 10	Inverness CT	2 – 2	Kelty Hearts	Caledonian Stadium
15:00	Devine 42', Zimba 54'	Report	Murray 11', 24'	Attendance: 2,137

25 October 2025 11	Peterhead	0 – 1	Inverness CT	Balmoor Stadium
15:00		Report	Mckay 67'	Attendance: 671

1 November 2025 12	Inverness CT	1 – 0	Montrose	Caledonian Stadium
15:00	Zimba 49'	Report		Attendance: 2,144

8 November 2025 13	Inverness CT	1 – 0	Cove Rangers	Caledonian Stadium
15:00	Robertson 18'	Report		Attendance: 2,102

22 November 2025 14	Inverness CT	4 – 0	Queen of the South	Caledonian Stadium
17:30	Sole 8', Zimba 34', Mackinnon 65', Bavidge 75'	Report		Attendance: 2,003
Note: Fixture was originally scheduled for a 15:00 kick-off, but was moved for live BBC Alba broadcast.

25 November 2025 15	Alloa Athletic	1 – 1	Inverness CT	Recreation Park
19:45	O'Donnell 74'	Report	Longstaff 45'	Attendance: 581
Note: Fixture was originally scheduled for 15 November 2025, but was moved due to international callups for Alloa loanees

13 December 2025 17	Inverness CT	4 – 0	Hamilton Academical	Caledonian Stadium
15:00	Robertson 3', Zimba 41', Bavidge 54', McKay 74'	Report		Attendance: 2,150

20 December 2025 18	Stenhousemuir	1 – 0	Inverness CT	Ochilview Park
15:00	Whyte 65', Grant (yellow card) 84' (yellow-red card)	Report		Attendance: 663

27 December 2025 19	Montrose	2 – 1	Inverness CT	Links Park
15:00	Lyons 62', Dillon 74'	Report	Stewart 2', Millen (red card) 62'	Attendance: 781

10 January 2026 21	Cove Rangers	0 – 0	Inverness CT	Balmoral Stadium
15:00		Report		Attendance: 575

20 January 2026 16	East Fife	0 – 2	Inverness CT	Bayview Stadium
19:45		Report	Stewart 70', Bavidge 90+2'	Attendance: 601
Note: Fixture was originally scheduled for 6 December 2025, but was rearranged due to the postponement of Inverness' cup tie vs Tranent

24 January 2026 22	Inverness CT	3 – 1	Alloa Athletic	Caledonian Stadium
15:00	Zimba 53', 72', Alonge 69'	Report	Stewart 23'	Attendance: 2,259

31 January 2026 23	Queen of the South	2 – 2	Inverness CT	Palmerston Park
15:00	Kennedy 20', Hewitt 79'	Report	Sole 9', Alonge 51'	Attendance: 1,938

7 February 2026 24	Inverness CT	3 – 0	East Fife	Caledonian Stadium
15:00	Stewart 3', Allan 70', Bavidge 82'	Report		Attendance: 2,160

14 February 2026 25	Hamilton Academical	0 – 1	Inverness CT	Broadwood Stadium
17:30		Report	Bavidge 37'	Attendance: 480

21 February 2026 26	Inverness CT	1 – 1	Stenhousemuir	Caledonian Stadium
15:00	Bavidge 36', Brannan (yellow card) 77' (yellow-red card)	Report	Whyte 6'	Attendance: 2,484

28 February 2026 27	Kelty Hearts	0 – 0	Inverness CT	New Central Park
15:00		Report		Attendance: 526

7 March 2026 28	Inverness CT	3 – 1	Montrose	Caledonian Stadium
15:00	Mckay 24', Bavidge 80', Alonge 90+5'	Report	Sutherland 49' (pen.)	Attendance: 2,110

14 March 2026 29	Inverness CT	1 – 1	Cove Rangers	Caledonian Stadium
15:00	Stewart 39'	Report	Demus 90+4'	Attendance: 1,832

17 March 2026 20	Inverness CT	3 – 1	Peterhead	Caledonian Stadium
19:45	Zimba 19', 55', Alonge 42'	Report	Shanks 64'	Attendance: 1,792
Note: Fixture was originally scheduled for 3 January but was postponed due to heavy snowfall.

21 March 2026 30	Alloa Athletic	1 – 1	Inverness CT	Recreation Park
15:00	Dewar 45'	Report	Zimba 60', (red card) 70'

27 March 2026 31	Inverness CT	1 – 1	Queen of the South	Caledonian Stadium
19:45	Millen 53'	Report	Clark 35'	Attendance: 2,466

11 April 2026 32	Stenhousemuir	1 – 1	Inverness CT	Ochilview Park
17:30	Aitken 81' (pen.)	Report	MacLeod 15'	Attendance: 1,096

14 April 2026 33	Peterhead	0 – 2	Inverness CT	Balmoor
19:45		Report	Stewart 39', Zimba 67'	Attendance: 780
Note: Fixture was originally scheduled for 4 April but was postponed due to Inverness CT participation in the Challenge Cup Final.

18 April 2026 34	Inverness CT	1 – 0	Kelty Hearts	Caledonian Stadium
15:00	A. Ferguson (o.g.) 61'	Report		Attendance: 2,405

25 April 2026 35	East Fife	1 – 1	Inverness CT	Bayview Stadium
15:00	McKenna 56'	Report	Mckay 89'	Attendance: 1,348

2 May 2026 36	Inverness CT	2 – 1	Hamilton Academical	Caledonian Stadium
15:00	Devine 3', Mckay 26'	Report	O'Hara 85'	Attendance: 5,029

=== Scottish Cup ===
Inverness were drawn into the Third round on 26 October 2025

10 December 2025 Third round	Tranent	1 – 2	Inverness Caledonian Thistle	Haddington
19:45	Jones 24'	Report	Robertson 17', Zimba 35'	Stadium: Millfield Park; Attendance: 1,007
Note: Fixture was originally scheduled for 29 November, and rescheduled for 6 December, then 8 December but was postponed due to a waterlogged pitch on all three occasions. Game was eventually moved to 10 December at Haddington Athletic's Millfield Park.

17 January 2026 Fourth round	The Spartans	0 – 0 (4 – 2 p)	Inverness Caledonian Thistle	Edinburgh
15:00		Report		Stadium: Ainslie Park; Attendance: 858
	Penalties
	Craigen (penalty scored) , Russell (penalty scored) , Dishington (penalty scored) , Scott (penalty missed) , Nair (penalty scored)		(penalty missed) Wotherspoon, (penalty missed) Zimba, (penalty scored) Longstaff, (penalty scored) Millen

=== League Cup ===
As with other sides that failed to qualify for European Competition, Inverness will be drawn into the Premier Sports Cup Group Stage on 28 May 2025. They were drawn into Group F with St Johnstone and Raith Rovers of the Championship and Elgin City and East Kilbride of League Two.

15 July 2025	Inverness Caledonian Thistle	2 – 0	Elgin City	Inverness
19:45	Mckay 31', Longstaff 39'	Report		Stadium: Caledonian Stadium; Attendance: 1,296

19 July 2025	Inverness Caledonian Thistle	0 – 1	St Johnstone	Inverness
15:00		Report	Ikepazu 90'	Stadium: Caledonian Stadium; Attendance: 1,585

22 July 2025	East Kilbride	2 – 6	Inverness Caledonian Thistle	East Kilbride
19:45	Devine (o.g.) 17', Robertson 87'	Report	Mckay 25', Allan 48', Longstaff 51', 57', MacLeod 54', Stewart 62',	Stadium: K-Park Training Academy; Attendance: 568

26 July 2025	Raith Rovers	5 – 1	Inverness Caledonian Thistle	Kirkcaldy
15:00	Easton 5', 7', 64', Hamilton 36', Savage 90' (o.g.)	Report	Wotherspoon 58'	Stadium: Stark's Park; Attendance: 1,032

=== Challenge Cup ===
==== League Phase ====
12 August 2025 League Phase	Elgin City	1 – 4	Inverness Caledonian Thistle	Borough Briggs
19:45	Gallagher 85'	Report	Bavidge 47', 90+5' (pen.), R. Thompson 50' Allan 63' (pen.)	Attendance: 852

26 August 2025 League Phase	Inverness Caledonian Thistle	4 – 1	Aberdeen B	Caledonian Stadium
19:45	Zimba 12', 77', 82', Mckay 88'	Report	Stephen 9'	Attendance: 507

5 September 2025 League Phase	Inverness Caledonian Thistle	2 – 1	Stirling Albion	Caledonian Stadium
19:45	Zimba 35', Sole 90+4'	Report	Cunningham 31', Murdoch (red card) 76'	Attendance: 543

23 September 2025 League Phase	Inverness Caledonian Thistle	6 – 0	Dundee B	Caledonian Stadium
19:45	Robertson 16', Alonge 23', Mckay 37', Allan 52', Bavidge 76', Sole 82'	Report		Attendance: 430

11 October 2025 League Phase	Forfar Athletic	1 – 4	Inverness Caledonian Thistle	Station Park
15:00	Rennie 26'	Report	MacLeod 49', Mackinnon 55', Longstaff 63', McKay 90'	Attendance: 512

11 November 2025 League Phase	Inverness Caledonian Thistle	6 – 0	Dundee United B	Caledonian Stadium
19:45	Zimba 7', 19', 43', Bavidge 49', 89', Alonge 51'	Report		Attendance: 390

16 December 2025 Second Round	Dumbarton	0 – 9	Inverness Caledonian Thistle	Dumbarton Football Stadium
19:45		Report	Bavidge 3', 27', 31', 37', MacLeod 22', Mckay 23', 81', Longstaff 43', Millen 65' (pen.)	Attendance: 326
Note: Rearranged due to the second rearrangement of Inverness' Scottish Cup tie with Tranent to 8 December 2025.

13 January 2026 Third round	Partick Thistle	3 – 3 (2 – 4 p)	Inverness Caledonian Thistle	Glasgow
19:45	Chalmers 11', Loughrey 60', Samuel 62'	Report	MacIntyre 23', Mckay 39', 84'	Stadium: Firhill Stadium; Attendance: 1,370
	Penalties
	Chalmers (penalty scored) , Turner (penalty missed) , McBeth (penalty missed) , Fitzpatrick (penalty scored)		(penalty scored) Allan, (penalty scored) Zimba, (penalty scored) Mckay, (penalty scored) Wotherspoon

27 January 2026 Quarter Finals	Inverness Caledonian Thistle	1 – 0	Stenhousemuir	Caledonian Stadium
19:45	Bavidge 73'	Report

24 February 2026 Semi Final	Ayr United	1 – 2	Inverness Caledonian Thistle	Ayr
19:45	Finney 34'	Report	Alonge 27', 82'	Attendance: 1,768

5 April 2026 Final	Raith Rovers	4 – 1	Inverness Caledonian Thistle	Firhill Stadium
16:10	Cameron 29', 55', Easton 60', 69'	Report	Stewart 37'	Attendance: 4,812

=== North of Scotland Cup ===
6 August 2025 North of Scotland Cup	Inverness Caledonian Thistle XI	6 – 0	Lossiemouth	Lossiemouth
19:45	R. Thompson 18', Gardiner 27', Bavidge 39', 41' (pen.), Alonge 51', 54'			Stadium: Grant Park

20 August 2025 North of Scotland Cup Quarter final	Strathspey Thistle	0 – 6	Inverness Caledonian Thistle XI	Inverness
19:30			R. Thompson 10', 43', Alonge 15', Sole 19', 25', Robertson 40'	Stadium: Caledonian Stadium

3 September 2025 North of Scotland Cup Semi final	Forres Mechanics	2 – 1	Inverness Caledonian Thistle XI	Forres
20:00	Mackenzie 3', Frame 60'		Zimba 43'	Stadium: Mosset Park

== First Team statistics ==
=== League Standings ===
Pos	Team	Pld	W	D	L	GF	GA	GD	Pts	Promotion, qualification or relegation
1	Inverness Caledonian Thistle (C, P)	36	21	11	4	60	24	+36	69 (Note: Inverness Caledonian Thistle were deducted five points for entering administration during the previous season.)	Promotion to the Championship
2	Stenhousemuir (O, P)	36	18	13	5	50	27	+23	67	Qualification for the Championship play-offs
3	Queen of the South	36	14	12	10	58	47	+11	54	Qualification for the Championship play-offs
4	Alloa Athletic	36	15	8	13	50	38	+12	53	Qualification for the Championship play-offs
5	Peterhead	36	12	7	17	48	64	−16	43	

Rules for classification: 1) Points; 2) Goal difference; 3) Goals scored; 4) Head-to-head points; 5) Head-to-head goal difference; 6) Play-off (only for deciding promotion, play-off participation and relegation).
(C) Champions; (O) Play-off winners; (P) Promoted

=== League Cup Standings ===
Pos	Team	Pld	W	PW	PL	L	GF	GA	GD	Pts	Qualification	STJ	RAI	ICT	EKB	ELG
1	St Johnstone	4	4	0	0	0	15	2	+13	12	Qualification for the second round	—	3–1	—	—	8–0
2	Raith Rovers	4	2	0	0	2	13	9	+4	6		—	—	5–1	2–4	—
3	Inverness Caledonian Thistle	4	2	0	0	2	9	8	+1	6		0–1	—	—	—	2–0
4	East Kilbride	4	2	0	0	2	11	12	−1	6		1–3	—	2–6	—	—
5	Elgin City	4	0	0	0	4	2	19	−17	0		—	1–5	—	1–4	—

Rules for classification: 1) goal difference, 2) goals scored, 3) away goals scored, 4) matches won, 5) away matches won, 6) drawing of lots.

=== Challenge Cup Standings ===
Pos	Team	Pld	W	D	L	GF	GA	GD	Pts	Qualification
1	Inverness Caledonian Thistle	6	6	0	0	26	4	+22	18	Advance to Second round
2	Stenhousemuir	6	6	0	0	18	2	+16	18	Advance to Second round
3	Montrose	6	5	1	0	18	9	+9	16	Advance to Second round
4	East Fife	6	4	1	1	17	9	+8	13	Advance to Second round
5	Stranraer	6	4	1	1	12	6	+6	13	Advance to Second round

Source: SPFL
Rules for classification: 1) Points; 2) Goal difference; 3) Goals scored; 4) Head-to-to head points; 5) Head-to-head goal difference; 6) Play-off (only for deciding qualification).

=== Current Squad ===
No.	Name	Position	Nationality	Place of birth	Date of birth	Previous club	Date Acquired	Fee	Contract end
Goalkeepers
	Szymon Rebilas	GK	(Poland)			Academy	2 August 2024	Trainee	31 May 2028
	Logan Ross	GK	(Scotland)		24 April 2004	(Scotland) Ross County	16 June 2025	Free	31 May 2026
	Ross Munro	GK	(Scotland)	Inverness	1 April 2000	(Scotland) Falkirk	17 June 2025	Free	31 May 2026
Defenders
	Danny Devine	CB	(Northern Ireland)	Belfast	7 September 1992	(Scotland) Dunfermline Athletic	17 August 2020	Free	31 May 2027
	Matthew Strachan	CB	(Scotland)	Inverness	3 June 2005	Academy	11 July 2022	Trainee	31 May 2026
	Jack Walker	CB	(Scotland)	Inverness	11 January 2006	Academy	2 August 2024	Trainee	31 May 2026
	Ben Gardiner	CB	(Scotland)	Inverness		Academy	20 June 2025	Trainee	31 May 2027
	Remi Savage	CB	(England)	Liverpool	26 October 2001	(England) Newcastle United	25 January 2025	Free	31 May 2026
	Ross Millen	RB	(Scotland)	Glasgow	28 September 1994	(England) Morecambe	19 June 2025	Free	31 May 2026
	James Clark	RB	(Scotland)	Fort William		Academy	20 June 2025	Trainee	31 May 2027
	Jake Davidson	CB	(Scotland)	Stirling	6 October 2000	(Scotland) Queen's Park	16 June 2023	Free	31 January 2026
	Mitchell Robertson	CB	(Scotland)		18 February 2005	(Scotland) Celtic	1 August 2025	Loan	31 May 2025
Midfielders
	Adam Mackinnon	CM	(Scotland)	Stornoway	30 April 2003	(Scotland) Ross County	2 August 2024	Free	31 May 2026
	Shae Keogh	CM	(Scotland)	Inverness	11 April 2007	Academy	2 August 2024	Trainee	31 May 2028
	Ben Corner	CM	(Scotland)	Fort William	2007	Academy	2 August 2024	Trainee	31 May 2028
	Calum MacLeod	DM	(Scotland)	Inverness	25 May 2006	Academy	1 July 2023	Trainee	31 May 2027
	Sam Reid	CM	(England)			Academy		Trainee	31 May 2027
	Robbie Thompson	AM	(Scotland)	Inverness	26 April 2004	Academy	1 July 2021	Trainee	31 May 2026
	Sam Thompson	CM	(Scotland)	Inverness		Academy	20 June 2025	Trainee	31 May 2027
	Paul Allan	CM	(Scotland)	Dunfermline	7 February 2000	(Scotland) Dunfermline Athletic	24 August 2024	Free	31 May 2027
	Joe Chalmers	CM	(Scotland)	Glasgow	3 January 1994	(Scotland) Dunfermline Athletic	18 June 2025	Free	31 May 2026
	Jordan Alonge	AM	(England)	London	1 January 1999	(Scotland) Forres Mechanics	3 July 2025	Free	31 May 2026
	Alfie Stewart	CM	(Scotland)	Newtonhill	31 July 2006	(Scotland) Aberdeen	15 July 2025	Loan	January 2026
Forwards
	Billy Mckay	ST	(Northern Ireland)	(England) Corby	22 October 1988	(Scotland) Ross County	1 July 2021	Free	31 May 2026
	Luis Longstaff	RW	(England)	Darlington	24 February 2001	(Scotland) Cove Rangers	20 July 2023	Free	31 May 2027
	David Wotherspoon	ST	(Canada)	(Scotland) Perth	16 January 1990	(Scotland) Dunfermline Athletic	24 June 2025	Free	31 May 2026
	Liam Sole	RW	(England)	Watford	21 December 1999	(Scotland) Livingston	7 July 2025	Loan	31 May 2026
	Alfie Bavidge	ST	(Scotland)	Aberdeen	11 April 2006	(Scotland) Aberdeen	1 August 2025	Loan	31 May 2026
	Chanka Zimba	ST	(Zambia)		29 December 2001	(England) Marine	1 August 2025	Free	31 May 2026
	Kieron Willox	RW	(Scotland)	Inverness	18 April 2006	(England) Stoke City	16 January 2026	Loan	31 May 2026

=== League Goalscorers ===
(As of match played 2 May 2026, vs. Hamilton Academical)

Rank	Player	Goals
1st	(Zambia) Chanka Zimba	11
2nd	(Scotland) Alfie Bavidge	10
3rd	(Northern Ireland) Billy Mckay	6
4th	(Scotland) Alfie Stewart	5
5th	(Canada) David Wotherspoon	4
5th	(England) Jordan Alonge	4
5th	(England) Liam Sole	4
6th	(England) Luis Longstaff	3
6th	(Scotland) Calum MacLeod	3
7th	(Scotland) Paul Allan	2
7th	(Northern Ireland) Danny Devine	2
7th	(Scotland) Mitchell Robertson	2
8th	(Scotland) Ross Millen	1
8th	(Scotland) Adam Mackinnon	1

=== Overall Goalscorers ===
(As of match played 2 May 2026, vs. Hamilton Academical)

Rank	Player	Goals
1st	(Scotland) Alfie Bavidge	20
2nd	(Zambia) Chanka Zimba	19
3rd	(Northern Ireland) Billy Mckay	15
4th	(England) Luis Longstaff	8
4th	(England) Jordan Alonge	8
5th	(Scotland) Alfie Stewart	7
5th	(England) Liam Sole	6
5th	(Scotland) Calum MacLeod	6
6th	(Canada) David Wotherspoon	5
6th	(Scotland) Mitchell Robertson	5
6th	(Scotland) Paul Allan	5
7th	(Scotland) Adam Mackinnon	2
7th	(Northern Ireland) Danny Devine	2
7th	(Scotland) Ross Millen	2
8th	(Scotland) Robbie Thompson	1
8th	(Scotland) Oscar MacIntyre	1

=== Hat-tricks ===
Player	Competition	Score	Opponent	Date
(Zambia) Chanka Zimba	Scottish Challenge Cup League Phase	4–1	Aberdeen B	26 August 2025
(Zambia) Chanka Zimba	Scottish Challenge Cup League Phase	6–0	Dundee United B	11 November 2025
(Scotland) Alfie Bavidge^{4}	Scottish Challenge Cup First round	9–0	Dumbarton	17 December 2025

== Transfers ==
Transfers In
Player	Age*	Pos	From	Fee	Date	Notes
(Scotland) Logan Ross	21	GK	(Scotland) Ross County	Free	16 June 2025	
(Scotland) Ross Munro	25	GK	(Scotland) Falkirk	Free	17 June 2025	
(Scotland) Joe Chalmers	31	MF	(Scotland) Dunfermline Athletic	Free	18 June 2025	
(Scotland) Ross Millen	30	DF	(England) Morecambe	Free	19 June 2025	
(Canada) David Wotherspoon	35	ST	(Scotland) Dunfermline Athletic	Free	24 June 2025	
(England) Jordan Alonge	26	MF	(Scotland) Forres Mechanics	Free	3 July 2025	
(Scotland) Oscar MacIntyre	20	DF	(Scotland) Hibernian	Free	25 July 2025	
(Zambia) Chanka Zimba	23	ST	(England) Marine	Free	1 August 2025	

Transfers Out
Player	Age*	Pos	To	Fee	Date	Notes
(Scotland) Lewis Nicolson	21	DF	Retired	N/A	22 May 2025	
(Scotland) Ethan Cairns	20	ST	(Scotland) Inverurie Loco Works	Free	31 May 2025	
(The Gambia) Musa Dibaga	25	GK	(Northern Ireland) Crusaders	Free	1 June 2025	

Loans In & Returnees
Player	Age*	Pos	From	Duration	Date In	Date Out	Notes
(Scotland) Sam Nixon	18	DF	(Scotland) Forres Mechanics	Return	1 July 2025	N/A	
(England) Liam Sole	25	ST	(Scotland) Livingston	Season	7 July 2025	31 May 2026	Extended to end of season
(Scotland) Alfie Stewart	18	MF	(Scotland) Aberdeen	Season	15 July 2025	31 May 2026	Extended to end of season
(Scotland) Alfie Bavidge	19	ST	(Scotland) Aberdeen	Season	1 August 2025	31 May 2026	
(Scotland) Mitchell Robertson	20	DF	(Scotland) Celtic	Season	1 August 2025	31 May 2026	
(Scotland) Ben Gardiner	17	ST	(Scotland) Brora Rangers	Return	11 October 2025	N/A	
(Scotland) Kieron Willox	19	ST	(England) Stoke City	Half Season	16 January 2026	31 May 2026	
(Scotland) Ben Brannan	19	MF	(Scotland) Kilmarnock	Half Season	6 February 2026	31 May 2026	

Loans Out & Returns
Player	Age*	Pos	To	Duration	Date Out	Date In	Notes
(Scotland) Connall Ewan	19	DF	(Scotland) Ross County	Return	1 July 2025	N/A	
(England) James Nolan	19	DF	(England) Manchester United	Return	1 July 2025	N/A	
(Scotland) Alfie Stewart	18	MF	(Scotland) Aberdeen	Return	1 July 2025	N/A	
(Scotland) Keith Bray	19	MF	(Scotland) Dunfermline Athletic	Return	1 July 2025	N/A	
(Scotland) Ben Brannan	18	DF	(Scotland) Kilmarnock	Return	1 July 2025	N/A	
(Scotland) Sam Nixon	19	DF	(Scotland) Forres Mechanics	Half Season	6 August 2025	January 2026	
(Scotland) Shae Keogh	18	ST	(Scotland) Brora Rangers	Half Season	20 August 2025	31 May 2026	Recalled due to injury on 18 October, re-signed on 16 January
(Scotland) Ben Gardiner	17	ST	(Scotland) Brora Rangers	Half Season	22 August 2025	11 October 2025	
(Scotland) Robbie Thompson	21	MF	(Scotland) Brora Rangers	Half Season	6 September 2025	January 2026	
(Scotland) Jack Walker	19	DF	(Scotland) Brora Rangers	Half Season	11 October 2025	January 2026	
(Scotland) Ben Corner	18	ST	(Scotland) Clachnacuddin	Half Season	23 October 2025	31 May 2026	Loan extended on 15 January
(Scotland) Ben Gardiner	18	ST	(Scotland) Clachnacuddin	Half Season	31 October 2025	January 2025	
(Scotland) Sam Reid	17	ST	(Scotland) Wick Academy	Short term	19 December 2025	1 January 2025	
(Scotland) Robbie Thompson	21	MF	(Scotland) Elgin City	Half Season	23 January 2026	31 May 2026	
(Scotland) Sam Thompson	18	MF	(Scotland) Brora Rangers	Half Season	23 January 2026	31 May 2026	
(Poland) Szymon Rebilas	18	GK	(Scotland) Wick Academy	Emergency	23 January 2026	January 2026	
(Scotland) Sam Reid	18	ST	(Scotland) Forres Mechanics	Half Season	23 January 2026	31 May 2026	
(Scotland) Jack Walker	20	DF	(Scotland) Buckie Thistle	Half Season	5 February 2026	31 May 2026	
(Scotland) Matthew Strachan	20	DF	(Scotland) Forfar Athletic	Half Season	5 February 2026	31 May 2026	
(Scotland) Jake Davidson	25	DF	(Scotland) The Spartans	Half Season	13 February 2026	31 May 2026	

*at time of transfer
