= 2026–27 Scottish Challenge Cup =

Tournament details
- Country: Scotland
- Dates: 11 August 2026 – 4 April 2027
- Teams: 50

Tournament statistics
- Matches played: 136
- Goals scored: 516 (3.79 per match)
- Top goal scorer(s): Kieran Phillips (11 goals)
- All statistics correct as of 3 November 2026.

The 2026–27 Scottish Challenge Cup, known as the KDM Evolution Trophy for sponsorship reasons, is the 35th season of the competition. The competition began on 11 August 2026 with an expanded league phase and the final is due to take place on either the weekend of 27 March or 3 April.

There are 50 competing teams:

- all 30 teams from the lower three tiers of the SPFL
- 10 'B' Teams from the 12 Premiership clubs (but not Falkirk or St Johnstone)
- 10 guest clubs from the Highland and Lowland Leagues

The defending champions were Raith Rovers, who were knocked out in the second round by Hamilton Academical on penalties.

== Format ==
Round	Date	Fixtures	Clubs	New entries
League Phase	11/12 August 2026 (matchday 1); 25/26 August 2026 (matchday 2); 8/9 September 2026 (matchday 3); 22/23 September 2026 (matchday 4); 26/27 September 2026 (matchday 5); 13 October 2026 (matchday 6)	120	50 → 32	10 teams from 2026–27 Scottish League One; 10 teams from 2026–27 Scottish League Two; 10 U21 teams from 2026–27 Scottish Premiership; 4 teams from 2026–27 Highland Football League; 6 teams from 2026–27 Lowland Football League
Round of 32	3/4 November 2026	16	32 → 16	10 teams from 2026–27 Scottish Championship
Round of 16	24/25 November 2026	8	16 → 8	
Quarter-Finals	12/13 January 2027	4	8 → 4	
Semi-Finals	9/10 February 2027	2	4 → 2	
Final	27/28 March or 3/4 April 2027	1	2 → 1	

== League phase ==
Fixtures were published on 16 July 2026 at 13:00. The matches were played from 11 August 2026 to 13 October 2026.

==== Matches ====
11 August 2026	Alloa Athletic	2–1	Stranraer	Alloa
19:45	Rankin 58'; Foster 63'		Foster 83'	Stadium: Recreation Park; Attendance: 211; Referee: Connor Ashwood

11 August 2026	Banks o' Dee	1–5	Peterhead	Aberdeen
19:45	MacLeod 88'		Jason Brown 1', 29'; Keir 19'; Forrest 45'; Mackie 49'	Stadium: Spain Park; Attendance: 268; Referee: Jordan Curran

11 August 2026	Berwick Rangers	3–4	Heart of Midlothian B	Berwick-upon-Tweed
19:45	Binnie 27' (pen.), 33' (pen.), 36' (pen.)		Daly 15', 62'; North 49' (pen.); Donkor 78'	Stadium: Shielfield Park; Attendance: 260; Referee: Iain Snedden

11 August 2026	Bonnyrigg Rose	1–0	Annan Athletic	Bonnyrigg
19:45	Watson 26'			Stadium: New Dundas Park; Attendance: 233; Referee: Gary Hanvidge

11 August 2026	Clachnacuddin	5–0	Dundee United B	Inverness
19:45	MacKenzie 14', 78'; Thompson 19'; Cooper 27'; MacRae 72'			Stadium: Grant Street Park; Attendance: 404; Referee: Ross Birrell

11 August 2026	Clyde	1–4	St Mirren B	Hamilton
19:45	Howie 61'		Douglas 53'; Lavery 70', 75'; Duff 84'	Stadium: New Douglas Park; Attendance: 270; Referee: Sean Murdoch

11 August 2026	Clydebank	4–0	Hibernian B	Clydebank
19:45	Niven 56'; Jack 76', 90'; Rossiter 85'			Stadium: Holm Park; Attendance: 512; Referee: Nathan Crawford

11 August 2026	Dumbarton	1–3	Airdrieonians	Dumbarton
19:45	Gilfedder 53'		MacDonald 39'; Gibson 63'; Yates 79'	Stadium: The Rock; Attendance: 445; Referee: Jamie Wilkie

11 August 2026	East Fife	2–2	The Spartans	Methil
19:45	Bah 77'; Easton 90'		Stowe 42'; Milne 90' (o.g.)	Stadium: Bayview Stadium; Attendance: 356; Referee: Lewis Hogarth

11 August 2026	East Kilbride	5–3	Kilmarnock B	East Kilbride
19:45	Moffat 23'; Gray 60'; Armstrong 66'; Elliott 67' (pen.); Foster 84'		Tiffoney 6'; Owen 29', 81'	Stadium: K-Park Training Academy; Attendance: 358; Referee: Graham Grainger

11 August 2026	Edinburgh City	3–1	Cowdenbeath	Edinburgh
19:45	Lawson 22', 23'; Aiken 31'		Walker 82' (pen.)	Stadium: Meadowbank Stadium; Attendance: 162; Referee: Daniel Graves

11 August 2026	Elgin City	1–2	Ross County	Elgin
19:45	Colloty 17'		Chin 40'; Emslie 90'	Stadium: Borough Briggs; Attendance: 654; Referee: Joel Kennedy

11 August 2026	Forfar Athletic	0–3	Aberdeen B	Forfar
19:45			Masson 12'; Mouloua 21' (pen.), 37' (pen.)	Stadium: Station Park; Attendance: 257; Referee: George Calder

11 August 2026	Formartine United	4–1	Dundee B	Pitmedden
19:45	Mykyta 38'; Parton 42'; Abart 60'; McCormick 76'		Wiseman 86'	Stadium: North Lodge Park; Attendance: 98; Referee: Robert Bowie

11 August 2026	Gala Fairydean Rovers	0–4	Rangers B	Galashiels
19:45			Stewart 9'; McCallion 10', 66' (pen.); Lawson 24'	Stadium: Netherdale; Attendance: 150; Referee: Cameron Stirling

11 August 2026	Kelty Hearts	4–3	Motherwell B	Kelty
19:45	Murray 30'; Shanley 40', 43'; Hislop 46'		McAllister 20' (pen.); Thomson 23'; Weir 56'	Stadium: New Central Park; Attendance: 190; Referee: Alastair Grieve

11 August 2026	Montrose	2–0	Fraserburgh	Montrose
19:45	Oliver 36' (pen.); Sutherland 47'			Stadium: Links Park; Attendance: 400; Referee: Peter Stuart

11 August 2026	Queen of the South	4–0	Cumbernauld Colts	Dumfries
19:45	Coughlin 11', 27'; Smith 15'; Dair 71'			Stadium: Palmerston Park; Attendance: 395; Referee: Euan Birch

11 August 2026	Stirling Albion	4–2	Cove Rangers	Stirling
19:45	Raine 36'; McLean 40' (pen.), 52'; Crane 45'		Oladipo 49', 71'	Stadium: Forthbank Stadium; Attendance: 315; Referee: Greg Soutar

12 August 2026	Hamilton Academical	1–3	Celtic B	Hamilton
19:45	Trialist 72'		Clearie 43'; Dargie 75'; Hatton 78'	Stadium: New Douglas Park; Attendance: 306; Referee: Mark Daly

25 August 2026	Airdrieonians	1–3	Stirling Albion	Airdrie
19:45	McLeish 28'		Wright 50'; Allan 76'; Dobbie 89'	Stadium: Excelsior Stadium; Attendance: 501; Referee: Colin Steven

25 August 2026	Alloa Athletic	3–0	Motherwell B	Alloa
19:45	McCafferty 3', 61'; Rankin 6'			Stadium: Recreation Park; Attendance: 153; Referee: Lewis Barnie

25 August 2026	Annan Athletic	2–2	Berwick Rangers	Annan
19:45	Maxwell 4', 54'		McCrystal 3'; Mbewe 50'	Stadium: Galabank; Attendance: 172; Referee: Peter Stuart

25 August 2026	Bonnyrigg Rose	2–1	Rangers B	Bonnyrigg
19:45	Smith 27'; Devine 63'		Stewart 40'	Stadium: New Dundas Park; Attendance: 513; Referee: Ross Donaldson

25 August 2026	Clachnacuddin	0–2	Elgin City	Inverness
19:45			Colloty 27' (pen.); Booth 72'	Stadium: Grant Street Park; Attendance: 360; Referee: Thomas Denholm

25 August 2026	Cove Rangers	2–0	Dundee United B	Aberdeen
19:45	White 52' (pen.); Stephen 78'			Stadium: Balmoral Stadium; Attendance: 148; Referee: Mark Daly

25 August 2026	Cowdenbeath	1–3	East Kilbride	Cowdenbeath
19:45	Williamson 42'		McGrattan 6', 77'; Elliott 78' (pen.)	Stadium: Central Park; Attendance: 277; Referee: Cameron Stirling

25 August 2026	Cumbernauld Colts	1–1	Kilmarnock B	Cumbernauld
19:45	McLaughlin 40'		Margiotta 28'	Stadium: Broadwood Stadium; Attendance: 100; Referee: Kieran O'Reilly

25 August 2026	Dumbarton	2–2	Celtic B	Dumbarton
19:45	Campbell 45'; Sedwell 51' (o.g.)		Clearie 10'; Hatton 32'	Stadium: The Rock; Attendance: 268; Referee: Conor Greenan

25 August 2026	East Fife	2–5	St Mirren B	Methil
19:45	Hamilton 16'; Ballantyne 48'		Farquhar 22' (pen.); Hodgkiss 25', 55'; Stoddart 77'; Thompson 87'	Stadium: Bayview Stadium; Attendance: 215; Referee: Iain Snedden

25 August 2026	Forfar Athletic	1–0 (Abandoned)	Formartine United	Forfar
19:45	Mailer 18'			Stadium: Station Park; Attendance: 174; Referee: Alastair Grieve

25 August 2026	Fraserburgh	1–1	Aberdeen B	Fraserburgh
19:45	Gibb 52'		Marshall 13' (pen.)	Stadium: Bellslea Park; Attendance: 290; Referee: Lewis Hogarth

25 August 2026	Hamilton Academical	0–1	Edinburgh City	Hamilton
19:45			Leitch 21'	Stadium: New Douglas Park; Attendance: 238; Referee: Daniel Graves

25 August 2026	Montrose	3–0	Clyde	Montrose
19:45	McClements 11'; Sutherland 58' (pen.); Barjonas 90'			Stadium: Links Park; Attendance: 244; Referee: Euan Birch

25 August 2026	Peterhead	2–1	Dundee B	Peterhead
19:45	Ross 24'; Mackie 81'		Perrie 75' (pen.)	Stadium: Balmoor Stadium; Attendance: 531; Referee: Greg Soutar

25 August 2026	Queen of the South	1–0	Hibernian B	Dumfries
19:45	Dair 69'			Stadium: Palmerston Park; Attendance: 327; Referee: Jamie Wilkie

25 August 2026	Ross County	4–0	Banks o' Dee	Dingwall
19:45	Jamieson 9'; Phillips 28', 73' (pen.); Coyle 61'			Stadium: Victoria Park; Attendance: 556; Referee: Gary Hanvidge

25 August 2026	Stranraer	3–0	Gala Fairydean Rovers	Stranraer
19:45	Clelland 28'; Traynor 78'; Hughes 86'			Stadium: Stair Park; Attendance: 219; Referee: Stuart Broadfoot

25 August 2026	The Spartans	5–0	Heart of Midlothian B	Edinburgh
19:45	Stowe 9', 27', 49'; Russell 45'; Trialist 77'			Stadium: Ainslie Park; Attendance: 171; Referee: Josh Hay

25 August 2026	Kelty Hearts	2–4	Clydebank	Kelty
20:00	Moffett 9'; Higginbotham 38'		Mulcahy 23'; McGowan 54'; Grant 71'; Jack 83'	Stadium: New Central Park; Attendance: 305; Referee: Abbie Hendry

1 September 2026	Stranraer	3–4	Celtic B	Stranraer
19:45	Dolan 36' (pen.); Healy 51'; Trialist 57'		Clearie 46' (pen.), 59' (pen.), 85'; McArdle 86'	Stadium: Stair Park; Attendance: 270; Referee: Regan Wallace

8 September 2026	Airdrieonians	1–0	St Mirren B	Airdrie
19:45	Mebude 77'			Stadium: Excelsior Stadium; Attendance: 256; Referee: Josh Hay

8 September 2026	Annan Athletic	4–0	Motherwell B	Annan
19:45	Roy 6', 40'; Muir 55'; O'Donnell 63'			Stadium: Galabank; Attendance: 153; Referee: Ross Birrell

8 September 2026	Banks o' Dee	1–1	Forfar Athletic	Aberdeen
19:45	Philipson 44'		Rennie 90'	Stadium: Spain Park; Attendance: 50; Referee: Ross Donaldson

8 September 2026	Berwick Rangers	1–0	Hibernian B	Berwick-upon-Tweed
19:45	Pyper 21'			Stadium: Shielfield Park; Attendance: 236; Referee: Jordan Curran

8 September 2026	Clyde	1–4	East Fife	Hamilton
19:45	Williamson 87'		McLeod 9', 61'; Ross 37'; Gaffney 90'	Stadium: New Douglas Park; Attendance: 226; Referee: Daniel Graves

8 September 2026	Clydebank	1–1	Alloa Athletic	Clydebank
19:45	Rossiter 68'		O'Donnell 37'	Stadium: Holm Park; Attendance: 605; Referee: Lewis Hogarth

8 September 2026	Cove Rangers	6–1	Dumbarton	Aberdeen
19:45	White 25', 53'; Oladipo 39'; Darge 57'; Parker 73'; Harrington 90'		Campbell 24'	Stadium: Balmoral Stadium; Attendance: 103; Referee: Greg Soutar

8 September 2026	Cowdenbeath	1–2	Kilmarnock B	Cowdenbeath
19:45	Denham 60'		Denham 31' (o.g.); Simpson 89'	Stadium: Central Park; Attendance: 172; Referee: Nathan Crawford

8 September 2026	Cumbernauld Colts	0–3	Kelty Hearts	Cumbernauld
19:45			Hislop 3', 4'; Flatman 90'	Stadium: Broadwood Stadium; Attendance: 118; Referee: Conor Greenan

8 September 2026	East Kilbride	3–1	Bonnyrigg Rose	East Kilbride
19:45	McKenzie 56'; McGuffie 63'; Baldé 79'		Devine 48'	Stadium: K-Park Training Academy; Attendance: 246; Referee: Gary Hanvidge

8 September 2026	Edinburgh City	1–1	Queen of the South	Edinburgh
19:45	Leitch 8'		Young 66'	Stadium: Meadowbank Stadium; Attendance: 186; Referee: Cameron Stirling

8 September 2026	Elgin City	7–0	Fraserburgh	Elgin
19:45	Willox 14'; Murray 21' (pen.), 45'; Gallagher 33'; MacDonald 59'; Brown 64'; Adams 76' (o.g.)			Stadium: Borough Briggs; Attendance: 370; Referee: Calum Foreman

8 September 2026	Formartine United	2–3	Dundee United B	Pitmedden
19:45	Asekomeh 71'; Dangana 90'		Hamilton 18', 19', 72'	Stadium: North Lodge Park; Attendance: 55; Referee: Konrad Spalony

8 September 2026	Gala Fairydean Rovers	1–6	Heart of Midlothian B	Galashiels
19:45	Tomany 30'		North 24', 77'; Mathie 54'; Donkor 61'; Glasgow 66'; Dow 89'	Stadium: Netherdale; Attendance: 522; Referee: Kieran O'Reilly

8 September 2026	Montrose	3–2	Dundee B	Montrose
19:45	Loudon 5', 30'; Sutherland 74'		Bland 62'; Wiseman 83'	Stadium: Links Park; Attendance: 278; Referee: Peter Stuart

8 September 2026	Peterhead	2–1	Clachnacuddin	Peterhead
19:45	Carnwath 15'; Keir 21'		MacRae 67'	Stadium: Balmoor Stadium; Attendance: 294; Referee: Joel Kennedy

8 September 2026	Ross County	3–4	Aberdeen B	Dingwall
19:45	Phillips 52', 66'; McCarvel 90'		Fasanya 13', 21'; Marshall 62'; Teasdale 90'	Stadium: Victoria Park; Attendance: 430; Referee: Mark Daly

8 September 2026	Stirling Albion	3–2	Rangers B	Stirling
19:45	McLean 13'; Mullin 33'; Raine 84'		McCallion 25' (pen.), 90' (pen.)	Stadium: Forthbank Stadium; Attendance: 369; Referee: Iain Snedden

8 September 2026	The Spartans	0–4	Hamilton Academical	Edinburgh
19:45			Welsh 3' (o.g.); Thomas 47'; MacDonald 63'; Ryan 65'	Stadium: Ainslie Park; Attendance: 223; Referee: Alastair Grieve

15 September 2026	East Fife	4–1	Motherwell B	Methil
19:45	Ross 7', 56', 66' (pen.); Healy 53' (pen.)		Buchanan 9'	Stadium: Bayview Stadium; Attendance: 246; Referee: Lewis Hogarth

22 September 2026	Alloa Athletic	4–1	Hibernian B	Alloa
19:45	Forbes 6'; Aitken 50'; Foster 68'; Rankin 70'		Shankland 63'	Stadium: Recreation Park; Attendance: 133; Referee: Peter Stuart

22 September 2026	Banks o' Dee	2–1	Aberdeen B	Aberdeen
19:45	MacLeod 50', 60'		Teasdale 20'	Stadium: Spain Park; Attendance: 250; Referee: Regan Wallace

22 September 2026	Berwick Rangers	3–2	Stranraer	Berwick-upon-Tweed
19:45	McCrone 1'; Somers 58'; Gregory 90'		Foster 4'; Dunne 89'	Stadium: Shielfield Park; Attendance: 251; Referee: Daniel Graves

22 September 2026	Bonnyrigg Rose	1–6	Airdrieonians	Bonnyrigg
19:45	Currie 25'		Iserhienrhien 21', 28'; Gallagher 33', 67'; Martyniuk 35' (o.g.); Trialist 88'	Stadium: New Dundas Park; Attendance: 437; Referee: Conor Greenan

22 September 2026	Clachnacuddin	1–5	Ross County	Inverness
19:45	Cooper 57'		Smith 8'; Diack 47', 51' (pen.); MacLeod 65'; Reid 83'	Stadium: Grant Street Park; Attendance: 423; Referee: Stuart Broadfoot

22 September 2026	Clyde	1–2	Rangers B	Hamilton
19:45	Connell 17'		Gentles 34'; Patton 60'	Stadium: New Douglas Park; Attendance: 224; Referee: Mark Daly

22 September 2026	Clydebank	2–1	St Mirren B	Clydebank
19:45	Rossiter 66'; McLaughlin 75'		Thompson 4'	Stadium: Holm Park; Attendance: 624; Referee: George Calder

22 September 2026	Dumbarton	3–2	Kilmarnock B	Dumbarton
19:45	Lang 53'; Sowa 63'; Hartington 76'		Foster 40'; Margiotta 86' (pen.)	Stadium: The Rock; Attendance: 267; Referee: Olivia Nicolson

22 September 2026	East Kilbride	3–3	Celtic B	East Kilbride
19:45	Moffat 16'; Calder 67'; Elliott 90'		Keenan 27', 41'; Dargie 80'	Stadium: K-Park Training Academy; Attendance: 421; Referee: Ross Birrell

22 September 2026	Edinburgh City	1–0	Dundee United B	Edinburgh
19:45	Walker 24'			Stadium: Meadowbank Stadium; Attendance: 142; Referee: Gary Hanvidge

22 September 2026	Elgin City	3–0	Dundee B	Elgin
19:45	Gallagher 2', 37'; Perrie 43' (o.g.)			Stadium: Borough Briggs; Attendance: 235; Referee: Owen Lawrence

22 September 2026	Forfar Athletic	0–2	Peterhead	Forfar
19:45			Yule 72'; Megginson 90'	Stadium: Station Park; Attendance: 221; Referee: Iain Snedden

22 September 2026	Formartine United	3–2	Montrose	Pitmedden
19:45	Wade 45' (pen.); Abart 72'; Thomas 75'		Clelland 82'; Jamieson 84'	Stadium: North Lodge Park; Attendance: 224; Referee: Graham Grainger

22 September 2026	Fraserburgh	0–5	Cove Rangers	Fraserburgh
19:45			Oppong 5'; Mahoney 33' (o.g.); White 57' (pen.); Oladipo 64'; Barry 90'	Stadium: Bellslea Park; Attendance: 253; Referee: Joel Kennedy

22 September 2026	Gala Fairydean Rovers	0–0	The Spartans	Galashiels
19:45				Stadium: Netherdale; Attendance: 275; Referee: Konrad Spalony

22 September 2026	Kelty Hearts	3–5	Heart of Midlothian B	Kelty
19:45	Murray 31', 79'; Walker 59'		Donkor 8', 30', 45'; Stevenson 17'; Glasgow 50'	Stadium: New Central Park; Attendance: 180; Referee: Euan Birch

22 September 2026	Queen of the South	1–1	Annan Athletic	Dumfries
19:45	Young 46' (pen.)		Dixon 51'	Stadium: Palmerston Park; Attendance: 1,086; Referee: Lewis Hogarth

22 September 2026	Stirling Albion	1–1	Cumbernauld Colts	Stirling
19:45	Denham 41'		Horn 81'	Stadium: Forthbank Stadium; Attendance: 335; Referee: Kieran O'Reilly

23 September 2026	Hamilton Academical	1–0	Cowdenbeath	Hamilton
19:45	Blues 71'			Stadium: New Douglas Park; Attendance: 153; Referee: Jamie Wilkie

25 September 2026	The Spartans	1–0	Dundee B	Edinburgh
19:45	Bland 90' (o.g.)			Stadium: Ainslie Park; Attendance: 198; Referee: Lewis Hogarth

26 September 2026	Airdrieonians	7–1	Berwick Rangers	Airdrie
15:00	Simpson 7'; McKinnon 9'; Smith 44', 80', 82'; G.Gallagher 53'; Taylor 79'		Mbewe 56'	Stadium: Excelsior Stadium; Attendance: 400; Referee: Ross Donaldson

26 September 2026	Alloa Athletic	2–2	Gala Fairydean Rovers	Alloa
15:00	Forbes 48'; O'Donnell 74'		Reilly 10', 61'	Stadium: Recreation Park; Attendance: 217; Referee: Ross Birrell

26 September 2026	Annan Athletic	2–1	Hibernian B	Annan
15:00	Maxwell 23'; O'Donnell 37'		Jiménez 84'	Stadium: Galabank; Attendance: 154; Referee: Gary Hanvidge

26 September 2026	Bonnyrigg Rose	3–0	Motherwell B	Bonnyrigg
15:00	Smith 39' (pen.); Young 45'; Devine 59'			Stadium: New Dundas Park; Attendance: 387; Referee: Iain Snedden

26 September 2026	Clachnacuddin	3–3	Celtic B	Inverness
15:00	MacKenzie 47'; Keogh 52'; MacRae 81'		Turley 31' (pen.), 90'; Daly 87'	Stadium: Grant Street Park; Attendance: 751; Referee: Jamie Wilkie

26 September 2026	Cove Rangers	2–1	Aberdeen B	Aberdeen
15:00	White 50' (pen.); Chalmers 85'		Teasdale 43'	Stadium: Balmoral Stadium; Attendance: 329; Referee: Abbie Hendry

26 September 2026	Cowdenbeath	1–3	Clyde	Cowdenbeath
15:00	Walker 81' (pen.)		Cruden 4'; Campbell 57'; Trialist 71'	Stadium: Central Park; Attendance: 214; Referee: Euan Birch

26 September 2026	Cumbernauld Colts	3–0	St Mirren B	Cumbernauld
15:00	McLaughlin 77'; Devlin 85'		Hogarth 1'; Stoddart 27'; MacKay 39' (pen.), 69'	Stadium: Broadwood Stadium; Attendance: 141; Referee: Alastair Grieve

26 September 2026	Dumbarton	3–2	Banks o' Dee	Dumbarton
15:00	McIntosh 11'; Honeyman 28' (pen.); Lang 67'		McGrath 45'; Duell 78'	Stadium: The Rock; Attendance: 341; Referee: Mark Daly

26 September 2026	East Fife	0–2	Clydebank	Methil
15:00			McLaughlin 6', 25'	Stadium: Bayview Stadium; Attendance: 481; Referee: Cameron Stirling

26 September 2026	Forfar Athletic	2–1	Dundee United B	Forfar
15:00	Mailer 4'; Shepherd 44'		Franczak 77'	Stadium: Station Park; Attendance: 266; Referee: Josh Hay

26 September 2026	Formartine United	2–0	Edinburgh City	Pitmedden
15:00	Ritchie 54'; Wade 83'			Stadium: North Lodge Park; Attendance: 101; Referee: Greg Soutar

26 September 2026	Fraserburgh	4–3	Stirling Albion	Fraserburgh
15:00	Barbour 18', 65'; Butcher 25' (pen.), 42'		McLean 19', 32'; Allan 39'	Stadium: Bellslea Park; Attendance: 340; Referee: Jordan Curran

26 September 2026	Hamilton Academical	3–0	Kilmarnock B	Hamilton
15:00	MacDonald 20'; Thomas 31'; Bradley 78'			Stadium: New Douglas Park; Attendance: 234; Referee: Grant Irvine

26 September 2026	Kelty Hearts	2–1	Montrose	Kelty
15:00	Cunningham 44'; Walker 78'		Loudon 25'	Stadium: New Central Park; Attendance: 226; Referee: Colin Steven

26 September 2026	Peterhead	0–1	Elgin City	Peterhead
15:00			Dingwall 22'	Stadium: Balmoor Stadium; Attendance: 562; Referee: Dan McFarlane

26 September 2026	Ross County	14–0	Heart of Midlothian B	Dingwall
15:00	Phillips 3', 7', 16', 45', 50'; Diack 26', 44', 56' (pen.); McCarvel 65', 74'; Lindsay 68'; Hamilton 72', 75', 87'			Stadium: Victoria Park; Attendance: 552; Referee: Joel Kennedy

26 September 2026	Stranraer	4–3	East Kilbride	Stranraer
15:00	Quigg 8'; McManus 37'; Dunne 56', 69'		McGuffie 15'; Robertson 35'; McKenzie 67'	Stadium: Stair Park; Attendance: 388; Referee: George Calder

26 September 2026	Queen of the South	4–2	Rangers B	Dumfries
20:00	Smith 18', 21', 76'; Coughlin 71'		Gentles 39'; Patton 60'	Stadium: Palmerston Park; Attendance: 484; Referee: Sean Murdoch

29 September 2026	Forfar Athletic	2–0	Formartine United	Forfar
19:45	Rennie 5'; Alston 9'			Stadium: Station Park; Attendance: 144; Referee: Alastair Grieve

13 October 2026	Airdrieonians	3–2	Heart of Midlothian B	Airdrie
19:45	Tumilty 44'; Iserhienrhien 46'; Boateng 79'		Benjaminsen 18', 24'	Stadium: Excelsior Stadium; Attendance: 475; Referee: Connor Ashwood

13 October 2026	Annan Athletic	0–0	Alloa Athletic	Alloa
19:45				Stadium: Recreation Park; Attendance: 102; Referee: Euan Birch

13 October 2026	Banks o' Dee	2–0	Motherwell B	Aberdeen
19:45	Ward 41'; Philipson 82'			Stadium: Spain Park; Attendance: 63; Referee: Daniel Graves

13 October 2026	Berwick Rangers	1–0	Queen of the South	Berwick-upon-Tweed
19:45	Handling 52'			Stadium: Shielfield Park; Attendance: 304; Referee: Gary Hanvidge

13 October 2026	Clyde	5–1	Clachnacuddin	Hamilton
19:45	Kiltie 14', 51'; Lovering 35'; Connell 47'; Dunachie 65'		Keogh 59'	Stadium: New Douglas Park; Attendance: 389; Referee: Olivia Nicolson

13 October 2026	Clydebank	4–0	Dumbarton	Clydebank
19:45	McHugh 23'; McLaughlin 64'; Docherty 78'; Munn 90' (o.g.)			Stadium: Holm Park; Attendance: 1,400; Referee: Calum Foreman

13 October 2026	Cove Rangers	2–1	Formartine United	Aberdeen
19:45	Keir 9'; Francis-Burrell 28'		McAllister 50'	Stadium: Balmoral Stadium; Attendance: 202; Referee: Kieran O'Reilly

13 October 2026	Cowdenbeath	2–3	Celtic B	Cowdenbeath
19:45	Walker 22' (pen.); Cameron 45'		Turley 11' (pen.), 26' (pen.); Meechan 68'	Stadium: Central Park; Attendance: 236; Referee: Konrad Spalony

13 October 2026	Cumbernauld Colts	2–1	East Fife	Cumbernauld
19:45	Williams 68'; Horn 86'		Gaffney 29'	Stadium: Broadwood Stadium; Attendance: 187; Referee: Regan Wallace

13 October 2026	East Kilbride	2–1	Kelty Hearts	East Kilbride
19:45	McGuffie 30'; McGrattan 90'		Murray 69'	Stadium: K-Park Training Academy; Attendance: 283; Referee: Cameron Stirling

13 October 2026	Edinburgh City	0–5	St Mirren B	Edinburgh
19:45			Hodgkiss 22'; Jackson 50'; Farquhar 56'; Thompson 58'; MacKay 78'	Stadium: Meadowbank Stadium; Attendance: 158; Referee: Thomas Denholm

13 October 2026	Elgin City	0–1	Aberdeen B	Elgin
19:45			Gyamfi 8'	Stadium: Borough Briggs; Attendance: 514; Referee: Stuart Broadfoot

13 October 2026	Fraserburgh	2–3	Dundee B	Fraserburgh
19:45	Strachan 30'; Sopel 68'		Boyd 1'; Perrie 62' (pen.); Bland 90'	Stadium: Bellslea Park; Attendance: 170; Referee: Joel Kennedy

13 October 2026	Gala Fairydean Rovers	0–2	Hamilton Academical	Galashiels
19:45			Shiels 19'; Thomas 68'	Stadium: Netherdale; Attendance: 259; Referee: Ross Donaldson

13 October 2026	Montrose	2–1	Dundee United B	Montrose
19:45	Buchanan 18' (o.g.); Barjonas 59'		Hamilton 34'	Stadium: Links Park; Attendance: 197; Referee: George Calder

13 October 2026	Peterhead	1–0	Rangers B	Peterhead
19:45	McLuckie 38'			Stadium: Balmoor Stadium; Attendance: 522; Referee: Owen Lawrence

13 October 2026	Ross County	2–1	Forfar Athletic	Dingwall
19:45	Turner 37'; Hamilton 88'		Hickey-Fugaccia 70'	Stadium: Victoria Park; Attendance: 628; Referee: Lewis Hogarth

13 October 2026	Stirling Albion	2–2	Hibernian B	Stirling
19:45	Fyfe 8', 33'		MacIntyre 6', 53'	Stadium: Forthbank Stadium; Attendance: 295; Referee: Conor Greenan

13 October 2026	Stranraer	3–3	Kilmarnock B	Stranraer
19:45	Mason 23' (pen.); Quigg 80'; Plank 85'		Owen 4'; Law 28'; Fraser-Taljic 42'	Stadium: Stair Park; Attendance: 281; Referee: Mark Daly

13 October 2026	The Spartans	1–1	Bonnyrigg Rose	Edinburgh
19:45	Dinanga 65'		Smith 68' (pen.)	Stadium: Ainslie Park; Attendance: 218; Referee: Jordan Curran

Notes

1. A- Cumbernauld Colts were awarded a 3–0 victory after St Mirren B were found to have fielded an ineligible player. The match had originally finished 4–2 to St Mirren B.

==== Table ====
Pos	Team	Pld	W	D	L	GF	GA	GD	Pts	Qualification
1	Clydebank	6	5	1	0	17	4	+13	16	Advance to Second round (seeded)
2	Ross County	6	5	0	1	30	7	+23	15	Advance to Second round (seeded)
3	Airdrieonians	6	5	0	1	21	8	+13	15	Advance to Second round (seeded)
4	Cove Rangers	6	5	0	1	19	7	+12	15	Advance to Second round (seeded)
5	Peterhead	6	5	0	1	12	4	+8	15	Advance to Second round (seeded)
6	East Kilbride	6	4	1	1	19	13	+6	13	Advance to Second round (seeded)
7	Elgin City	6	4	0	2	14	3	+11	12	Advance to Second round (unseeded)
8	Alloa Athletic	6	3	3	0	12	5	+7	12	Advance to Second round (unseeded)
9	Hamilton Academical	6	4	0	2	11	4	+7	12	Advance to Second round (unseeded)
10	Montrose	6	4	0	2	13	8	+5	12	Advance to Second round (unseeded)
11	Celtic B	6	3	3	0	18	14	+4	12	Advance to Second round (unseeded)
12	Queen of the South	6	3	2	1	11	5	+6	11	Advance to Second round (unseeded)
13	Stirling Albion	6	3	2	1	16	12	+4	11	Advance to Second round (unseeded)
14	Aberdeen B	6	3	1	2	11	8	+3	10	Advance to Second round (unseeded)
15	Bonnyrigg Rose	6	3	1	2	9	11	−2	10	Advance to Second round (unseeded)
16	Edinburgh City	6	3	1	2	6	9	−3	10	Advance to Second round (unseeded)
17	Berwick Rangers	6	3	1	2	11	15	−4	10	Advance to Second round (unseeded)
18	St Mirren B	6	3	0	3	15	9	+6	9	Advance to Second round (unseeded)
19	Annan Athletic	6	2	3	1	9	5	+4	9	Advance to Second round (unseeded)
20	Formartine United	6	3	0	3	12	10	+2	9	Advance to Second round (unseeded)
21	The Spartans	6	2	3	1	9	7	+2	9	Advance to Second round (unseeded)
22	Kelty Hearts	6	3	0	3	15	15	0	9	Advance to Second round (unseeded)
23	Heart of Midlothian B	6	3	0	3	17	29	−12	9	
24	Cumbernauld Colts	6	2	2	2	7	10	−3	8	
25	Stranraer	6	2	1	3	16	15	+1	7	
26	East Fife	6	2	1	3	13	13	0	7	
27	Forfar Athletic	6	2	1	3	6	9	−3	7	
28	Banks o' Dee	6	2	1	3	8	14	−6	7	
29	Dumbarton	6	2	1	3	10	19	−9	7	
30	Rangers B	6	2	0	4	11	11	0	6	
31	Clyde	6	2	0	4	11	15	−4	6	
32	Kilmarnock B	6	1	2	3	11	16	−5	5	
33	Clachnacuddin	6	1	1	4	11	17	−6	4	
34	Fraserburgh	6	1	1	4	7	21	−14	4	
35	Dundee B	6	1	0	5	7	15	−8	3	
36	Dundee United B	6	1	0	5	5	14	−9	3	
37	Gala Fairydean Rovers	6	0	2	4	3	17	−14	2	
38	Hibernian B	6	0	1	5	4	14	−10	1	
39	Cowdenbeath	6	0	0	6	6	15	−9	0	
40	Motherwell B	6	0	0	6	4	20	−16	0	

Source: SPFL
Rules for classification: 1) Points; 2) Goal difference; 3) Goals scored; 4) Highest number of wins; 5) Lower disciplinary points; 6) Drawing of lots.

== Second round ==
The draw for the second round was made on 15 October at 1pm live on the SPFL YouTube channel.

=== Draw and seeding ===
All 10 teams from the Championship entered the competition in the second round, and were seeded in the draw along with the six highest ranked teams from the League phase.

Teams in bold advanced to the third round.

Seeded	Unseeded
**Arbroath**; **Ayr United**; **Dunfermline Athletic**; Greenock Morton; **Inverness Caledonian Thistle**; **Livingston**; **Partick Thistle**; **Queen's Park**; Raith Rovers; **Stenhousemuir**; **Clydebank**; **Ross County**; **Airdrieonians**; **Cove Rangers**; **Peterhead**; **East Kilbride**	Elgin City; Alloa Athletic; **Hamilton Academical**; Montrose; Celtic B; Queen of the South; Stirling Albion; Aberdeen B; Bonnyrigg Rose; Edinburgh City; Berwick Rangers; St Mirren B; Annan Athletic; Formartine United; The Spartans; **Kelty Hearts**

==== Matches ====
3 November 2026	**Stenhousemuir**	**4–1**	Berwick Rangers	Stenhousemuir
19:45	Bright 52'; Shinnie 64'; Carrick 77'; Lloyd 80'		Handling 15'	Stadium: Ochilview Park; Attendance: 280; Referee: George Calder

3 November 2026	Aberdeen B	**1–1** (**2–4** p)	**Queen's Park**	Aberdeen
19:45	McLean 78'		McDonnell 14'	Stadium: Balmoral Stadium; Attendance: 212; Referee: Ross Birrell
	**Penalties**
	Ross (penalty scored); To (penalty missed); Teasdale (penalty scored); Carrol (penalty missed)		Todorov (penalty scored); Martin (penalty scored); Longridge (penalty scored); Lawson (penalty scored)

3 November 2026	**East Kilbride**	**7–3**	Stirling Albion	East Kilbride
19:45	McGuffie 17'; Elliott 22' (pen.); Fagan 38'; Armstrong 40'; Baldé 49'; McGrattan 73', 86'		Allan 30', 71'; Banner 58'	Stadium: K-Park Training Academy; Attendance: 245; Referee: Daniel Graves

3 November 2026	St Mirren B	**1–2**	**Peterhead**	Paisley
19:45	Thompson 69'		Teklemichael 24'; Kerr 81'	Stadium: St Mirren Park; Attendance: 338; Referee: Jordan Curran

3 November 2026	**Arbroath**	**1–0**	Queen of the South	Arbroath
19:45	Reilly 68' (pen.)			Stadium: Gayfield Park; Attendance: 311; Referee: Lewis Hogarth

3 November 2026	Annan Athletic	**0–2**	**Ayr United**	Annan
19:45			Shanks 25'; Douglas 45'	Stadium: Galabank; Attendance: 423; Referee: Abbie Hendry

3 November 2026	**Clydebank**	**1–0**	Alloa Athletic	Clydebank
19:45	Samson 22'			Stadium: Holm Park; Attendance: 661; Referee: Josh Hay

3 November 2026	The Spartans	**0–2**	**Livingston**	Edinburgh
19:45			Blaney 81'; Muirhead 90'	Stadium: Ainslie Park; Attendance: 278; Referee: Gary Hanvidge

3 November 2026	**Airdrieonians**	**5–0**	Elgin City	Airdrie
19:45	Gibson 2'; G.Gallagher 35'; Yates 66'; Tumilty 72'; Mahon 76'			Stadium: Excelsior Stadium; Attendance: 316; Referee: Alastair Grieve

3 November 2026	Edinburgh City	**0–3**	**Partick Thistle**	Edinburgh
19:45			Samuel 45'; Stanway 45'; Drozd 87'	Stadium: Meadowbank Stadium; Referee: Peter Stuart

3 November 2026	**Inverness Caledonian Thistle**	**1–0**	Montrose	Inverness
19:45	Stewart 79'			Stadium: Caledonian Stadium; Attendance: 560; Referee: Dan McFarlane

3 November 2026	Formartine United	**0–2**	**Cove Rangers**	Pitmedden
19:45			Oppong 2'; Oladipo 52'	Stadium: North Lodge Park; Attendance: 175; Referee: Joel Kennedy

3 November 2026	**Ross County**	**2–0**	Celtic B	Dingwall
19:45	Phillips 12', 53'			Stadium: Victoria Park; Attendance: 735; Referee: Euan Birch

3 November 2026	**Hamilton Academical**	**1–1** (**5–3** p)	Raith Rovers	Hamilton
19:45	Shiels 12'		Tiffoney 45'	Stadium: New Douglas Park; Attendance: 530; Referee: Sean Murdoch
	**Penalties**
	Morgan (penalty scored); Bannigan (penalty scored); Crawford (penalty scored); Ryan (penalty scored); Lyon (penalty scored)		Dowds (penalty scored); Adamson (penalty scored); Tiffoney (penalty missed); Millen (penalty scored)

3 November 2026	Greenock Morton	**0–1**	**Kelty Hearts**	Greenock
19:45			Murray 9'	Stadium: Cappielow; Attendance: 885; Referee: Mark Daly

3 November 2026	Bonnyrigg Rose	**2–4**	**Dunfermline Athletic**	Bonnyrigg
19:45	Smith 7'; Scott 51'		Tod 21', 37'; Kane 24' (pen.); Thomas 34'	Stadium: New Dundas Park; Attendance: 1,044; Referee: Greg Soutar

== Third round ==
The draw for the third round was made on 5 November at 12pm live on the SPFL YouTube channel.

Championship	League One	League Two	Lowland League West
Arbroath; Ayr United; Dunfermline Athletic; Inverness Caledonian Thistle; Livingston; Partick Thistle; Queen's Park; Stenhousemuir	Airdrieonians; Cove Rangers; East Kilbride; Hamilton Academical; Peterhead; Ross County	Kelty Hearts	Clydebank

==== Matches ====
24 November 2026	Livingston	v	Peterhead	Livingston
19:45				Stadium: Almondvale Stadium

24 November 2026	Hamilton Academical	v	Cove Rangers	Hamilton
19:45				Stadium: New Douglas Park

24 November 2026	East Kilbride	v	Partick Thistle	East Kilbride
19:45				Stadium: K-Park Training Academy

24 November 2026	Dunfermline Athletic	v	Kelty Hearts	Dunfermline
19:45				Stadium: East End Park

24 November 2026	Ross County	v	Stenhousemuir	Dingwall
19:45				Stadium: Victoria Park

24 November 2026	Arbroath	v	Airdrieonians	Arbroath
19:45				Stadium: Gayfield Park

24 November 2026	Ayr United	v	Inverness Caledonian Thistle	Ayr
19:45				Stadium: Somerset Park

24 November 2026	Clydebank	v	Queen's Park	Clydebank
19:45				Stadium: Holm Park

== Quarter-finals ==
The draw for the quarter-finals will be made on 26 November at 1pm live on the SPFL YouTube channel along with the semi-final draw.

== Semi-finals ==
The draw for the semi-finals will be made on 26 November at 1pm live on the SPFL YouTube channel along with the quarter-final draw.
