= Bavidge =

Bavidge is a Scottish surname. It may refer to:

- Alfie Bavidge (born 2006), Scottish footballer
- Martin Bavidge (born 1980), Scottish footballer, father of Alfie Bavidge
