= Alfie Stewart (footballer) =

Scottish footballer (born 2006)

Personal information
- Full name: Alfie Stewart
- Date of birth: 31 July 2006 (age 20)
- Place of birth: Newtonhill, Scotland
- Position: Midfielder

Team information
- Current team: Inverness Caledonian Thistle (on loan from) Aberdeen
- Number: 35

Youth career
- 2015–2022: Newtonhill AFC
- 2022–2024: Aberdeen

Senior career*
Years	Team	Apps	(Gls)
2024–	Aberdeen	0	(0)
2024	→ Peterhead (loan)	15	(1)
2025	→ Inverness Caledonian Thistle (loan)	17	(3)
2025–2026	→ Inverness Caledonian Thistle (loan)	35	(6)
2026–	→ Inverness Caledonian Thistle (loan)	3	(0)

International career^{‡}
2026–	Scotland U21	2	(1)
- * Club domestic league appearances and goals as of 10:01, 3 May 2026 (UTC) ‡ National team caps and goals as of 07:50, 21 November 2026 (UTC)

Alfie Stewart (born 31 July 2006) is a Scottish footballer who currently plays as a midfielder for Scottish Championship club Inverness Caledonian Thistle on loan from Scottish Premiership side Aberdeen.

== Club career ==
=== Aberdeen ===
Stewart started his career with the youth team of Aberdeenshire Amateur Football Association side, Newtonhill AFC, before joining Aberdeen's academy rising through the ranks before being promoted to the senior team.

In January 2024, Stewart was loaned out to Scottish League Two side, Peterhead.

In January 2025, Stewart was loaned out to Scottish League One side, Inverness Caledonian Thistle, alongside fellow Don, Alfie Bavidge.

On 15 July 2025, Stewart returned to Inverness Caledonian Thistle on a half season loan, making his second debut for the club on the same day in a 2–0 home win over Elgin City in the League Cup.

During the 2025–26 season, Stewart played an important role in helping his side win the League One title, with the trophy and promotion to Scottish Championship being secured on the final day of the season with a 2–1 win over Hamilton Academical. His performances across the season drew significant attention, and he was subsequently nominated for the PFA Scotland League One Player of the Year award.

== International Career ==
On 4 November 2026, Stewart and fellow Inverness player, Calum MacLeod, were called up for the Scotland U-21 squad ahead of friendlies against Ukraine and the United States.

== Career statistics ==
As of match played 2 May 2026

Appearances and goals by club, season and competition
Club	Season	League			Scottish Cup		League Cup		Continental		Other		Total	
Club	Season	Division	Apps	Goals	Apps	Goals	Apps	Goals	Apps	Goals	Apps	Goals	Apps	Goals
Aberdeen B	2023–24	—			—		—		—		1 (Note: Appearance(s) in Scottish Challenge Cup)	0	1	0
Aberdeen B	2024–25	—			—		—		—		1	0	1	0
Aberdeen B	Total		—		—		—		—		2	0	2	0
Aberdeen	2023–24	Scottish Premiership	0	0	0	0	0	0	—		—		0	0
Aberdeen	2024–25	Scottish Premiership	0	0	0	0	0	0	—		—		0	0
Aberdeen	2025–26	Scottish Premiership	0	0	0	0	0	0	—		—		0	0
Aberdeen	Total		0	0	0	0	0	0	—		—		0	0
Peterhead (loan)	2023–24	Scottish League Two	15	1	0	0	0	0	—		2 (Note: Appearance(s) in Scottish League One play-offs)	0	17	1
Peterhead (loan)	Total		15	1	0	0	0	0	—		2	0	17	1
Inverness Caledonian Thistle (loan)	2024–25	Scottish League One	17	3	—		—		—		—		17	3
Inverness Caledonian Thistle (loan)	2025–26	Scottish League One	35	6	1	0	4	1	—		3	1	18	2
Inverness Caledonian Thistle (loan)	Total		52	9	1	0	4	1	—		3	1	35	5
Career total			67	10	1	0	4	1	0	0	7	1	54	6

== Honours ==
=== Inverness ===
- Scottish League One: 2025/26

=== Individual ===
- William Hill Scottish League One Player of the Year: 2025/26
