= Jordan Alonge =

English professional footballer (born 1999)

Personal information
- Full name: Jordan Alonge
- Date of birth: 15 February 1999 (age 27)
- Place of birth: London, England
- Position: Attacking midfielder

Team information
- Current team: Salisbury
- Number: 10

Youth career
- Crystal Palace

College career
Years	Team	Apps	(Gls)
2018–2021	Baker Wildcats	?	(17)
2021–2023	Fairleigh Dickinson Knights	34	(5)

Senior career*
Years	Team	Apps	(Gls)
2023–2024	Thunder Bay Chill	4	(2)
2024	Rothes	4	(0)
2024–2025	Forres Mechanics	26	(13)
2025–2026	Inverness Caledonian Thistle	25	(4)
2026–	Salisbury	2	(0)
- * Club domestic league appearances and goals as of 13:46, 18 August 2026 (UTC)

Jordan Alonge (born 15 February 1999) is an English footballer who as a midfielder for National League South club Salisbury.

== Career ==
Born in London, Alonge played at a series of London academies before spending two years with Baker University in Kansas. He would also spend three years with Fairleigh Dickinson University's soccer team, the Fairleigh Dickinson Knights., before joining USL League Two side, Thunder Bay Chill in an attempt to gain an MLS deal. After failing to progress through the trial periods, and the club's decision to into abeyance due to travel and financial constraints, Alonge returned to the UK in Inverness, first joining Rothes in the Highland League, before joining league rivals, Forres Mechanics.

After impressing with the Mechanics, Alonge made his first move into professional football in July 2025, joining Scottish League One side, Inverness Caledonian Thistle.

On 17 July 2026, Alonge joined National League South club Salisbury.

== Honours ==
=== Thunder Bay Chill ===
USL League Two Deep North Division: 2023, 2024
