= Cammy Ballantyne (footballer, born 2000) =

Scottish footballer (born 2000)

Personal information
- Full name: Cameron F Ballantyne
- Date of birth: 22 April 2000 (age 26)
- Place of birth: Armadale, Scotland
- Position: Midfielder

Team information
- Current team: East Fife
- Number: 23

Youth career
- Hibernian
- ????–2015: Hearts
- 2015–2018: St Johnstone

Senior career*
Years	Team	Apps	(Gls)
2018–2024	St Johnstone	5	(0)
2018–2019	→ BSC Glasgow (loan)		
2019–2020	→ Montrose (loan)	21	(1)
2020–2021	→ Montrose (loan)	21	(3)
2021–2022	→ Montrose (loan)	28	(1)
2022–2023	→ Montrose (loan)	13	(0)
2024	→ Clyde (loan)	14	(1)
2024–2026	Linfield	33	(0)
2026–	East Fife	1	(0)
- * Club domestic league appearances and goals as of 27 August 2026

Cammy Ballantyne (born 22 April 2000) is a Scottish professional footballer who plays as a midfielder for Scottish League One club East Fife.

== Club career ==
Ballantyne started his career in the youth ranks of Hibs, Hearts and St Johnstone. He signed his first professional contract at McDiarmid Park in 2018. His time in Perth was largely spent out on loan elsewhere, which included four separate spells at Montrose.

He signed for Clyde on a short-term loan deal in February 2024.

In June 2024, Ballantyne signed for Linfield. After two seasons in Northern Ireland, Ballantyne returned to Scotland in 2026 to join Scottish League One club East Fife.
