= Ben Gardiner =

Australian professional rugby league coach

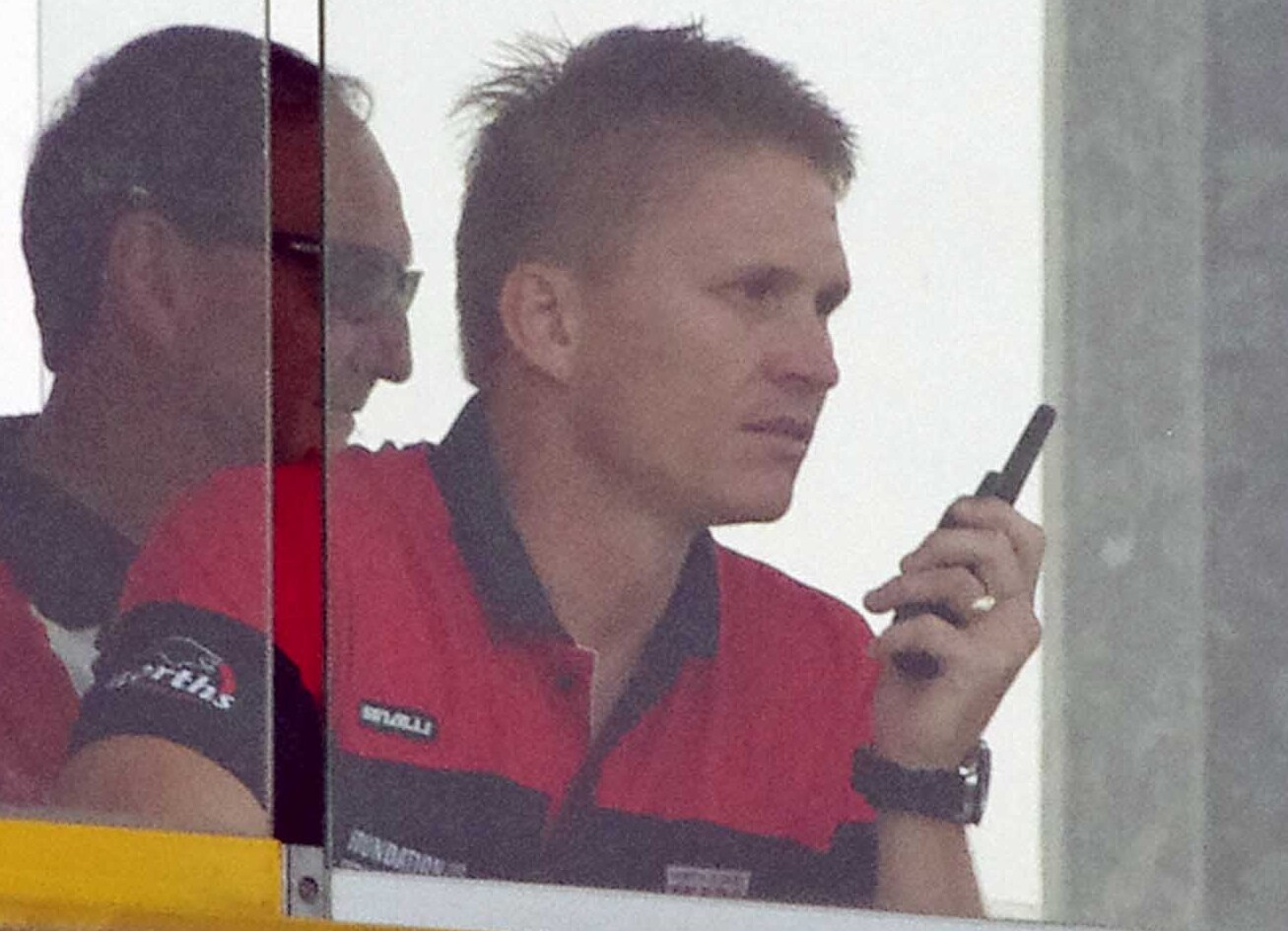

Personal information
- Full name: Benjamin Gardiner
- Born: Yamba, New South Wales, Australia

Coaching information
Club
Years	Team	Gms	W	D	L	W%
2022	Wests Tigers	1	0	0	1	0
Representative
Years	Team	Gms	W	D	L	W%
2023	New Zealand Māori	1	0	0	1	0
2023–	Samoa	11	3	0	8	27
- Source: As of 15 November 2026

Ben Gardiner is an Australian professional rugby league coach who is the head coach of Samoa at international level.

He is the assistant coach of the Perth Bears who are scheduled to enter the expanded NRL in 2027.

Gardiner has previously coached the Wests Tigers in the National Rugby League and the New Zealand Māori at representative level. He has also been the head coach at the North Sydney Bears and the Wests Tigers in the NSW Cup. He held coaching roles at the Sydney Roosters, Cronulla Sharks, South Sydney Rabbitohs and the Wests Tigers, as well as being the assistant coach at the Penrith Panthers where he was part of the team that won the 2023 and 2024 premierships. Gardiner was also on the Kiwis coaching staff for 22 test matches.
