= Luis Longstaff =

English footballer (born 2001)

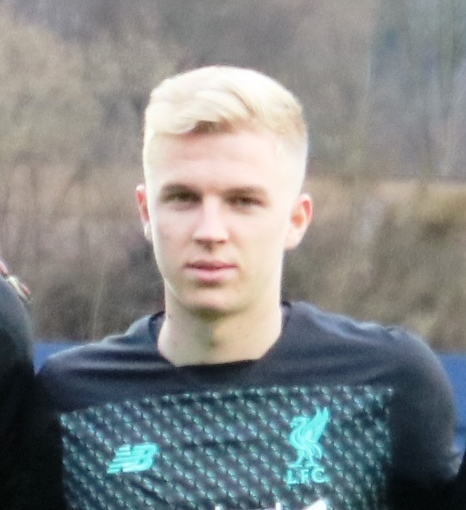
- Longstaff with Liverpool in 2019

Personal information
- Full name: Luis James Longstaff
- Date of birth: 24 February 2001 (age 25)
- Place of birth: Darlington, England
- Height: 5 ft 6 in (1.68 m)
- Position: Right winger

Team information
- Current team: Inverness Caledonian Thistle
- Number: 19

Youth career
- 2010–2015: Newcastle United
- 2015–2019: Liverpool

Senior career*
Years	Team	Apps	(Gls)
2019–2022	Liverpool	0	(0)
2021–2022	→ Queen's Park (loan)	28	(4)
2022–2023	Cove Rangers	33	(1)
2023–	Inverness Caledonian Thistle	83	(6)

International career^{‡}
- England U16
2017	England U17	1	(0)
- * Club domestic league appearances and goals as of 09:56, 3 May 2026 (UTC) ‡ National team caps and goals as of 21:38, 7 May 2023 (UTC)

Luis James Longstaff (born 24 February 2001) is an English footballer who plays as a right winger for Scottish Championship side Inverness Caledonian Thistle.

== Career ==
Longstaff made his professional debut for Liverpool on 17 December 2019, starting in the away match against Aston Villa in the quarter-finals of the EFL Cup.

On 31 August 2021, he joined Scottish third tier side Queen's Park on loan until 30 June 2022.

In June 2022 it was announced by Liverpool that he would leave the club at the end of the month when his contract expired.

On 4 August 2022, he joined Scottish Championship side Cove Rangers. After one season with Cove, Longstaff signed a two-year contract with Inverness Caledonian Thistle in July 2023.

== Personal life ==
Although of a similar age and originating from the north-east of England, he is not related to fellow players Sean and Matty Longstaff.

The secondary school he went to was Greenfield Academy.

== Career statistics ==
=== Club ===
As of match played 14 January 2023

Appearances and goals by club, season and competition
Club	Season	League			National cup (Note: Includes FA Cup, Scottish Cup)		League cup (Note: Includes EFL Cup, Scottish League Cup)		Continental		Other		Total	
Club	Season	Division	Apps	Goals	Apps	Goals	Apps	Goals	Apps	Goals	Apps	Goals	Apps	Goals
Liverpool	2019–20	Premier League	0	0	0	0	1	0	0	0	0	0	1	0
Liverpool	2021–22	Premier League	0	0	0	0	0	0	0	0	—		0	0
Liverpool	Total		0	0	0	0	1	0	0	0	0	0	1	0
Liverpool U21	2020–21	—			—		—		—		3 (Note: Appearance(s) in EFL Trophy)	1	3	1
Queen's Park (loan)	2021–22	Scottish League One	28	4	1	0	0	0	—		2 (Note: Appearance(s) in Scottish Challenge Cup)	0	31	4
Cove Rangers	2022–23	Scottish Championship	33	1	2	0	0	0	—		1	0	36	1
Inverness Caledonian Thistle	2023–24	Scottish Championship	26	1	2	0	2	0	—		5 (Note: One appearance in Scottish Challenge Cup, four appearances in Scottish Championship play-offs)	0	35	1
Inverness Caledonian Thistle	2024–25	Scottish League One	25	2	1	0	4	1	—		1	0	31	3
Inverness Caledonian Thistle	2025–26	Scottish League One	9	2	0	0	4	3	—		5	1	18	6
Inverness Caledonian Thistle	Total		60	5	3	0	10	4	—		11	1	84	10
Career total			121	10	6	0	11	4	0	0	17	2	155	16

== Honours ==
Liverpool

- FA Youth Cup: 2018–19
