= Ross Munro (footballer) =

Scottish footballer

Personal information
- Full name: Ross Alexander Munro
- Date of birth: 1 April 2000 (age 26)
- Place of birth: Inverness, Scotland
- Height: 1.82 m (6 ft 0 in)
- Position: Goalkeeper

Team information
- Current team: Inverness Caledonian Thistle
- Number: 1

Youth career
- Nairn County
- –2017: Ross County

Senior career*
Years	Team	Apps	(Gls)
2017–2024	Ross County	2	(0)
2017	→ Brora Rangers (loan)		
2019–2020	→ Raith Rovers (loan)	14	(0)
2020	→ Cowdenbeath (loan)	2	(0)
2021	→ Annan Athletic (loan)	2	(0)
2024–2025	Dundalk	20	(0)
2025	Falkirk	0	(0)
2025–	Inverness Caledonian Thistle	36	(0)
- * Club domestic league appearances and goals as of 09:44, 3 May 2026 (UTC)

Ross Alexander Munro (born 1 April 2000) is a Scottish professional footballer, who plays as a goalkeeper for Scottish League One club, Inverness Caledonian Thistle.

== Club career ==
Born in Inverness, Munro grew up in Nairn. He signed for Ross County at under-15 level after playing for Nairn County. In January 2017, Munro signed a one month development loan with Highland League side Brora Rangers. On 2 February 2017, it was announced that Munro had extended his loan until the end of the season.

On 17 May 2018, it was announced that Munro and three other youth players had signed their first senior professional contracts with Ross County. Munro made his debut for Ross County in the Scottish Challenge Cup against Heart of Midlothian Colts in August 2018 which County won 2-1. He went on to play in every round of the Challenge Cup, including the final as Ross County lifted the trophy beating Connah's Quay Nomads 3–1.

In June 2019, Munro moved on loan to Scottish League One club Raith Rovers until January 2020.

Munro joined Scottish League Two club Cowdenbeath on a 7-day emergency loan on 11 December 2020, and had a loan spell at Annan Athletic later that season. He signed a new one-year contract at the club in June 2021.

In March 2022, Munro signed a new one-year contract with the club.

In January 2024, Munro joined League of Ireland Premier Division club Dundalk on a permanent deal.

In December 2024, Munro agreed join Scottish Championship club, Falkirk until the end of the season on a permanent deal.

== International career ==
In October 2018, Munro was called up to the Scotland national under-21 side for a fixture against Ukraine.

== Career statistics ==
As of match played 1 November 2025

Appearances and goals by club, season and competition
Club	Season	League			National Cup		League Cup		Other		Total	
Club	Season	Division	Apps	Goals	Apps	Goals	Apps	Goals	Apps	Goals	Apps	Goals
Ross County	2018–19	Scottish Championship	1	0	0	0	0	0	5 (Note: Appearances in the Scottish Challenge Cup)	0	6	0
Ross County	2019–20	Scottish Premiership	0	0	–		–		–		0	0
Ross County	2020–21	Scottish Premiership	0	0	0	0	0	0	–		0	0
Ross County	2021–22	Scottish Premiership	1	0	0	0	0	0	–		1	0
Ross County	2022–23	Scottish Premiership	0	0	0	0	1	0	–		1	0
Ross County	2023–24	Scottish Premiership	0	0	0	0	3	0	–		3	0
Ross County	Total		2	0	0	0	4	0	5	0	11	0
Raith Rovers (loan)	2019–20	Scottish League One	14	0	2	0	3	0	3	0	22	0
Cowdenbeath (loan)	2020–21	Scottish League Two	2	0	0	0	0	0	0	0	2	0
Annan Athletic (loan)	2020–21	Scottish League Two	2	0	0	0	0	0	0	0	2	0
Dundalk	2024	LOI Premier Division	20	0	0	0	–		2 (Note: Appearances in the Leinster Senior Cup)	0	22	0
Falkirk	2024–25	Scottish Championship	0	0	0	0	–		0	0	0	0
Inverness Caledonian Thistle	2025–26	Scottish League One	12	0	0	0	4	0	2	0	18	0
Career total			52	0	2	0	11	0	12	0	77	0

== Honours ==
Ross County

- Scottish Championship: 2018–19
- Scottish Challenge Cup: 2018–19

Raith Rovers

- Scottish League One: 2019–20

Falkirk

- Scottish Championship: 2024–25

Inverness Caledonian Thistle

- Scottish League One: 2025–26
