= Liam Sole =

English footballer

Personal information
- Date of birth: 21 December 1999 (age 26)
- Place of birth: Watford, England
- Position: Midfielder

Team information
- Current team: Inverness Caledonian Thistle

Youth career
- ????–2018: MK Dons

Senior career*
Years	Team	Apps	(Gls)
2018–2019	MK Dons	0	(0)
2019	→ St Albans City (loan)	13	(1)
2019–2020	Nottingham Forest	0	(0)
2021–2023	St Albans City	30	(2)
2023	→ Kings Langley (loan)		
2023–2024	Maidstone United	31	(2)
2024–2026	Livingston	12	(0)
2025–2026	→ Inverness Caledonian Thistle (loan)	28	(4)
2026–	Inverness Caledonian Thistle	0	(0)
- * Club domestic league appearances and goals as of 21:45, 22 June 2026 (UTC)

Liam Sole (born 21 December 1999) is an English professional footballer who plays for Scottish Championship club Inverness Caledonian Thistle.

== Club career ==
Sole began his career in the youth academy of MK Dons, signing his first professional contract in May 2018.

He spent a short spell on loan at St Albans City in 2019 before leaving MK Dons permanently.

In October 2019, Sole signed a short-term contract with Nottingham Forest. However he left the club in 2020 without making a single first team appearance.

The midfielder rejoined St Albans City permanently in 2021. He joined Kings Langley on loan in February 2023.

Sole signed for Maidstone United ahead of the 2023–2024 season, and was part of the side that knocked then English Championship side Ipswich Town out of the FA Cup in January 2024.

In May 2024, Sole signed a pre-contract with Scottish side Livingston.

In July 2025, Sole went on loan to Inverness Caledonian Thistle in Scottish League One.

In May 2026, Sole left Livingston following the expiration of his contract. Returning to Inverness on a one year deal.

== Honours ==
Livingston

- Scottish Challenge Cup: 2024–25

Inverness Caledonian Thistle

- Scottish League One: 2025–26
