= Robbie Thompson (Scottish footballer) =

Scottish footballer (born 2004)

Personal information
- Date of birth: 26 April 2004 (age 22)
- Place of birth: Inverness, Scotland
- Position: Midfielder

Team information
- Current team: Strathspey Thistle

Youth career
- 2013–2021: Inverness Caledonian Thistle

Senior career*
Years	Team	Apps	(Gls)
2021–2026	Inverness Caledonian Thistle	30	(0)
2021–2022	→ Clachnacuddin (loan)	28	(5)
2022–2023	→ Clachnacuddin (loan)	13	(0)
2023	→ Clachnacuddin (loan)	6	(0)
2024	→ The Spartans (loan)	9	(1)
2025–2026	→ Brora Rangers (loan)	5	(3)
2026–	→ Elgin City (loan)	11	(0)
2026–	Strathspey Thistle	0	(0)
- * Club domestic league appearances and goals as of 18:32, 29 May 2026 (UTC)

Robbie Thompson (born 26 April 2004) is a Scottish professional footballer who plays as a midfielder for Strathspey Thistle in the Highland League.

His younger brother, Sam, plays for Inverness Caledonian Thistle.

== Career ==
In July 2021, Thompson signed for Inverness Caledonian Thistle after coming through the club's youth academies since joining at age 9, before being sent to fellow Invernessian side, Clachnacuddin in the Highland League on two consecutive loans stretching to January 2023. On 2 January 2023, Thompson made his professional debut in a 6–1 win over Cove Rangers in the Scottish Championship, before being loaned back to Clachnacuddin for the remainder of the season in March. On 16 September 2023, Thompson made his first start for Inverness, playing 71 minutes in a 1–0 loss that infamously "broke the curse" with Raith Rovers beating Inverness for the first time in 23 years.

In February 2024, Thompson was loaned out to Edinburgh side, The Spartans, who played in League Two, where he helped in propelling the club into the League One playoffs, before getting recalled by Inverness before The Spartans final two games against eventual winners, Dumbarton.

In September 2025, Thompson joined Highland League leaders, Brora Rangers on loan until January, scoring on his debut on the same day in a 5–0 away win against Keith.

On 23 January 2026, Thompson joined Scottish League Two side, Elgin City, on loan for the remainder of the season, making his debut the following day in a 2–2 away draw at Dumbarton.

On 29 May 2026, having being told he was leaving Inverness upon the expiration of his contract at the end of the season, Thompson joined Highland League side, Strathspey Thistle.
