= Kieron Willox =

Scottish footballer

Personal information
- Date of birth: 18 April 2006 (age 20)
- Place of birth: Inverness, Scotland
- Position: Midfielder

Team information
- Current team: Elgin City

Youth career
- –2022: Inverness Caledonian Thistle
- 2022–2024: Rangers
- 2024–2026: Stoke City

Senior career*
Years	Team	Apps	(Gls)
2025–2026	Stoke City	0	(0)
2026	→ Inverness Caledonian Thistle (loan)	5	(0)
2026–	Elgin City	0	(0)
- * Club domestic league appearances and goals as of 19:48, 4 July 2026 (UTC)

Kieron Willox (born 18 April 2006) is a Scottish footballer who plays as a midfielder for Scottish League Two side, Elgin City.

== Career ==
Born in Inverness, Willox grew up in Auldearn. He joined Inverness Caledonian Thistle in 2016, coming through the youth ranks. On 28 June 2022, aged 16, Willox signed with Rangers on a professional basis. Willox would go on and make appearances primarily for the U18's as well as one appearance for Rangers B, in the Lowland League as a substitute against Bo'ness United. On 5 July 2024, Willox signed for EFL Championship side, Stoke City after a successful trial towards the end of the previous season. On 16 January 2026, Willox returned home, and joined his boyhood club, Inverness Caledonian Thistle, on loan until the end of the season. Willox made his debut the following day in a 0–0 away draw to The Spartans in the Scottish Cup, coming on as a substitute in the second half of extra time. Willox made seven appearances in 2025–26 for Inverness as they won the Scottish League One title. Willox left Stoke at the end of the 2025–26 season after not having his contract renewed.

On 3 July 2026, Willox signed for Scottish League Two side Elgin City.

== Career statistics ==
As of match played 27 March 2026

Appearances and goals by club, season and competition
Club	Season	League			National cup		League cup		Other		Total	
Club	Season	Division	Apps	Goals	Apps	Goals	Apps	Goals	Apps	Goals	Apps	Goals
Stoke City	2025–26	Championship	0	0	0	0	0	0	—		0	0
Inverness Caledonian Thistle (loan)	2025–26	Scottish League One	5	0	1	0	0	0	1 (Note: Appearances in Scottish Challenge Cup)	0	7	0
Career total			5	0	1	0	0	0	1	0	7	0
