= 2025–26 Scottish League One =

Scottish League One
- Season: 2025–26
- Dates: 2 August 2025 – 2 May 2026
- Champions: Inverness Caledonian Thistle
- Promoted: Inverness Caledonian Thistle; Stenhousemuir
- Relegated: Kelty Hearts
- Matches: 180
- Goals: 476 (2.64 per match)
- Top goalscorer: Oli Shaw (19 goals)
- Biggest home win: Stenhousemuir 5–0 East Fife (10 January 2026)
- Biggest away win: Kelty Hearts 0–4 Hamilton Academical (20 September 2025); Montrose 0–4 Hamilton Academical (18 October 2025); Montrose 0–4 Alloa Athletic (8 November 2025); Peterhead 0–4 Cove Rangers (27 December 2025); East Fife 1–5 Queen of the South (24 January 2026)
- Highest scoring: Montrose 5–4 Alloa Athletic (14 March 2026)
- Longest winning run: Inverness Caledonian Thistle (5 games)
- Longest unbeaten run: Inverness Caledonian Thistle (18 games)
- Longest winless run: Kelty Hearts (12 games)
- Longest losing run: East Fife (7 games)
- Highest attendance: 5,029; Inverness Caledonian Thistle v Hamilton Academical (2 May 2026)
- Lowest attendance: 240; Cove Rangers v Alloa Athletic (4 April 2026)
- Total attendance: 141,769
- Average attendance: 787
- All statistics correct as of 2 May 2026.

The 2025–26 Scottish League One (known as William Hill League One for sponsorship reasons) was the 13th season of Scottish League One, the third tier of Scottish football. The season began on 2 August 2025.

Ten teams contested the league: Alloa Athletic, Cove Rangers, East Fife, Hamilton Academical, Inverness Caledonian Thistle, Kelty Hearts, Montrose, Peterhead, Queen of the South and Stenhousemuir.

== Teams ==
The following teams changed division after the 2024–25 season.

=== To League One ===
Promoted from League Two

- Peterhead
- East Fife

Relegated from the Championship

- Hamilton Academical

=== From League One ===
Relegated to League Two

- Annan Athletic
- Dumbarton

Promoted to the Championship

- Arbroath

=== Stadia and locations ===
Alloa Athletic	Cove Rangers	East Fife	Hamilton Academical
Recreation Park	Balmoral Stadium	Bayview Stadium	Broadwood Stadium (Note: Hamilton Academical are ground-sharing with Cumbernauld Colts.)
Capacity: 3,100	Capacity: 2,602	Capacity: 1,980	Capacity: 8,086
Inverness Caledonian Thistle	Location of teams in 2025–26 Scottish League One		Kelty Hearts
Caledonian Stadium	Location of teams in 2025–26 Scottish League One		New Central Park
Capacity: 7,512	Location of teams in 2025–26 Scottish League One		Capacity: 2,181
Montrose	Peterhead	Queen of the South	Stenhousemuir
Links Park	Balmoor	Palmerston Park	Ochilview Park
Capacity: 4,936	Capacity: 3,150	Capacity: 8,690	Capacity: 3,746

Notes

All grounds are equipped with floodlights.

=== Personnel and kits ===
Team	Manager	Captain	Kit manufacturer	Shirt sponsor
Alloa Athletic	(Scotland) Andy Graham	(Scotland) Scott Taggart	Pendle	Northern Gas and Power
Cove Rangers	(Scotland) Paul Hartley	(Scotland) Mitch Megginson	Adidas	KR Group
East Fife	(Scotland) Dick Campbell	(Scotland) Alan Trouten	Erreà	MPH Group (Home); JADA (Away); Harley Taxis (Third)
Hamilton Academical	(Scotland) Darian MacKinnon	(Scotland) Stephen Hendrie	Kurt	None
Inverness Caledonian Thistle	(Scotland) Scott Kellacher	(Northern Ireland) Danny Devine	Puma	Craig Wood Solicitors
Kelty Hearts	(Scotland) Thomas O'Ware	(England) Craig Clay	Adidas	Bellway
Montrose	(Scotland) Stewart Petrie	(Scotland) Andrew Steeves	Uhlsport	Montrose Port Authority
Peterhead	(Scotland) Jordon Brown (Scotland) Ryan Strachan	(Scotland) Jason Brown	Puma	The Score Group
Queen of the South	(Republic of Ireland) Peter Murphy	(England) Matty Douglas	Macron	The Venue Dumfries
Stenhousemuir	(Scotland) Gary Naysmith	(Scotland) Gregor Buchanan	Uhlsport	LOC Hire

=== Managerial changes ===
Team	Outgoing manager	Manner of departure	Date of vacancy	Position in table	Incoming manager	Date of appointment
Hamilton Academical	(Scotland) John Rankin	Resigned	29 November 2025	5th	(Scotland) Darian MacKinnon	1 December 2025

== League table ==
Pos	Team	Pld	W	D	L	GF	GA	GD	Pts	Promotion, qualification or relegation
1	Inverness Caledonian Thistle (C, P)	36	21	11	4	60	24	+36	69 (Note: Inverness Caledonian Thistle were deducted five points for entering administration during the previous season.)	Promotion to the Championship
2	Stenhousemuir (O, P)	36	18	13	5	50	27	+23	67	Qualification for the Championship play-offs
3	Queen of the South	36	14	12	10	58	47	+11	54	Qualification for the Championship play-offs
4	Alloa Athletic	36	15	8	13	50	38	+12	53	Qualification for the Championship play-offs
5	Peterhead	36	12	7	17	48	64	−16	43	
6	Montrose	36	11	9	16	48	67	−19	42	
7	Cove Rangers	36	9	11	16	41	44	−3	38	
8	East Fife	36	9	9	18	34	61	−27	36	
9	Hamilton Academical (O)	36	16	7	13	54	42	+12	34 (Note: Hamilton Academical were deducted six points for breaching SPFL rules regarding amateur players, a further nine points for failing to hold at least a bronze level licence and then six more points for failing to pay players' wages on time.)	Qualification for the League One play-offs
10	Kelty Hearts (R)	36	6	11	19	33	62	−29	29	Relegation to League Two

Rules for classification: 1) Points; 2) Goal difference; 3) Goals scored; 4) Head-to-head points; 5) Head-to-head goal difference; 6) Play-off (only for deciding promotion, play-off participation and relegation).
(C) Champions; (O) Play-off winners; (P) Promoted; (R) Relegated

== Results ==
Teams play each other four times, twice in the first half of the season (home and away) and twice in the second half of the season (home and away), making a total of 180 games, with each team playing 36.

=== First half of season (Matches 1–18) ===
Home \ Away	ALL	COV	EFI	HAM	ICT	KEL	MON	PET	QOS	STE
Alloa Athletic	—	2–1	1–1	1–0	1–1	3–0	0–1	4–0	0–2	0–0
Cove Rangers	0–0	—	0–1	2–1	0–1	0–2	3–3	1–2	0–2	0–1
East Fife	0–1	2–0	—	1–1	0–2	2–1	1–1	0–1	2–1	1–0
Hamilton Academical	1–0	0–0	1–2	—	3–1	3–1	2–0	3–0	1–2	2–0
Inverness Caledonian Thistle	1–0	1–0	4–1	4–0	—	2–2	1–0	2–0	4–0	1–2
Kelty Hearts	0–2	2–5	0–3	0–4	0–3	—	0–3	1–2	1–1	0–1
Montrose	0–4	0–3	2–1	0–4	0–2	1–2	—	2–1	2–1	3–0
Peterhead	2–1	3–1	4–1	2–2	0–1	3–2	1–1	—	3–0	1–4
Queen of the South	1–0	1–1	3–0	1–4	0–2	2–1	1–0	4–0	—	1–1
Stenhousemuir	1–2	1–0	1–1	0–0	1–0	2–2	3–1	3–1	0–0	—

Legend: Blue = home team win; Yellow = draw; Red = away team win.

=== Second half of season (Matches 19–36) ===
Home \ Away	ALL	COV	EFI	HAM	ICT	KEL	MON	PET	QOS	STE
Alloa Athletic	—	2–2	2–0	3–0	1–1	2–1	4–1	1–1	1–4	0–0
Cove Rangers	0–1	—	0–0	2–2	0–0	1–1	3–1	2–1	1–1	2–0
East Fife	0–2	2–1	—	0–3	1–1	0–1	2–3	2–1	1–5	2–2
Hamilton Academical	1–0	2–0	1–0	—	0–1	1–2	1–1	3–1	1–3	0–1
Inverness Caledonian Thistle	3–1	1–1	3–0	2–1	—	1–0	3–1	3–1	1–1	1–1
Kelty Hearts	1–1	0–2	1–1	0–0	0–0	—	3–1	1–1	1–1	0–2
Montrose	5–4	2–3	1–0	0–2	2–1	1–1	—	1–1	3–2	0–2
Peterhead	3–1	0–4	3–1	2–3	0–2	0–2	1–1	—	1–1	0–1
Queen of the South	1–2	2–0	2–2	4–1	2–2	3–1	2–2	0–2	—	1–1
Stenhousemuir	1–0	1–0	5–0	3–0	1–1	2–0	2–2	2–2	2–0	—

Legend: Blue = home team win; Yellow = draw; Red = away team win.

== Season statistics ==
As of 2 May 2026

=== Scoring ===
==== Top scorers ====
Rank	Player	Club	Goals
1	(Scotland) Oli Shaw	Hamilton Academical	19
2	(Scotland) Kieran Shanks	Peterhead	17
3	(Scotland) Mitch Megginson	Cove Rangers	12
4	(Zambia) Chanka Zimba	Inverness Caledonian Thistle	11
5	(Scotland) Alfie Bavidge	Inverness Caledonian Thistle	10
5	(Scotland) Callum Sandilands	Montrose	10

== Awards ==
Month	Manager of the Month		Player of the Month	
Month	Manager	Club	Player	Club
August	(Scotland) Scott Kellacher	Inverness Caledonian Thistle	(Scotland) Ross Munro	Inverness Caledonian Thistle
September	(Scotland) Scott Kellacher	Inverness Caledonian Thistle	(Scotland) Oli Shaw	Hamilton Academical
October	(Scotland) Gary Naysmith	Stenhousemuir	(Scotland) Kieran Millar	East Fife
November	(Scotland) Scott Kellacher	Inverness Caledonian Thistle	(Scotland) Oli Shaw	Hamilton Academical
December	(Republic of Ireland) Peter Murphy	Queen of the South	(England) Matty Douglas	Queen of the South
January	(Scotland) Gary Naysmith	Stenhousemuir	(Scotland) Matthew Aitken	Stenhousemuir
February	(Scotland) Andy Graham	Alloa Athletic	(Scotland) Alfie Bavidge	Inverness Caledonian Thistle
March	(Scotland) Gary Naysmith	Stenhousemuir	(Scotland) Kieran Shanks	Peterhead
April	(Scotland) Darian MacKinnon	Hamilton Academical	(Scotland) Adam Emslie	Cove Rangers

== League One play-offs ==
=== Bracket ===
Semi-finals
1	Hamilton Academical	3	2	5
4	Forfar Athletic	1	1	2
2	The Spartans	0	1	1
3	Clyde	2	1	3

Final
1	Hamilton Academical	1	4	5
3	Clyde	1	3	4

=== Semi-finals ===
==== First leg ====
5 May 2026	Forfar Athletic	1–3	Hamilton Academical	Forfar
19:45	Shepherd 90'		MacDonald 44'; Shaw 71', 76'	Stadium: Station Park; Attendance: 972; Referee: Colin Steven

5 May 2026	Clyde	2–0	The Spartans	Hamilton
19:45	Connell 24'; Dunachie 64'			Stadium: New Douglas Park; Attendance: 823; Referee: Joel Kennedy

==== Second leg ====
9 May 2026	Hamilton Academical	2–1 (5–2 agg.)	Forfar Athletic	Cumbernauld
15:00	Shaw 63', 74'		Sutherland 80' (pen.)	Stadium: Broadwood Stadium; Attendance: 718; Referee: Sean Murdoch

9 May 2026	The Spartans	1–1 (1–3 agg.)	Clyde	Edinburgh
15:00	Booth 15'		Williamson 66' (pen.)	Stadium: Ainslie Park; Attendance: 903; Referee: Calum Scott

=== Final ===
==== First leg ====
12 May 2026	Clyde	1–1	Hamilton Academical	Hamilton
19:45	McGinlay 38'		McKinstry 10'	Stadium: New Douglas Park; Attendance: 1,502; Referee: Ross Hardie

==== Second leg ====
15 May 2026	Hamilton Academical	4–3 (5–4 agg.)	Clyde	Cumbernauld
19:45	Gallacher 18', 65'; MacDonald 21', 52'		Smutek 16' (o.g.); Connell 45'; Dunachie 59'	Stadium: Broadwood Stadium; Attendance: 1,768; Referee: Lloyd Wilson
