= Mitchell Robertson =

Scottish footballer (born 2005)

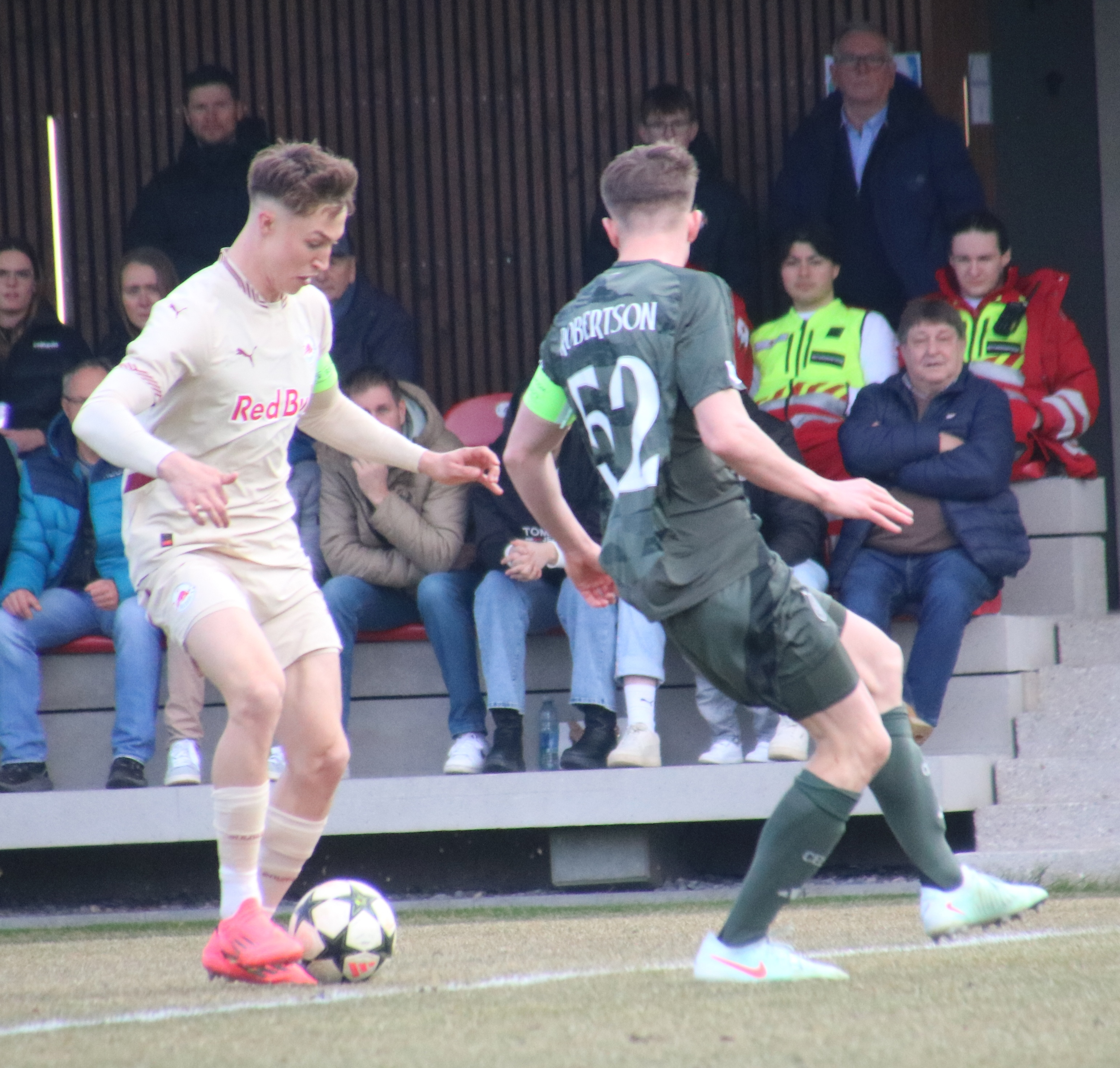
- Mitchell Robertson playing for Celtic B in 2025.

Personal information
- Full name: Mitchell Robertson
- Date of birth: 18 February 2005 (age 21)
- Position: Defender

Team information
- Current team: Livingston

Youth career
- –2017: Albion Rovers
- 2017–2021: Celtic

Senior career*
Years	Team	Apps	(Gls)
2021–2026	Celtic	0	(0)
2021–2026	Celtic B	80	(4)
2025–2026	→ Inverness Caledonian Thistle (loan)	12	(2)
2026–	Livingston	2	(0)
2026	→ Inverness Caledonian Thistle (loan)	8	(0)
2026	→ East Kilbride (loan)	2	(0)
- * Club domestic league appearances and goals as of 16:55, 20 July 2026 (UTC)

Mitchell Robertson (born 18 February 2005) is a Scottish Professional footballer who currently plays as a defender for Scottish Championship side, Livingston.

== Club career ==
Robertson started his career at the youth team of Albion Rovers in Scottish League One, before joining Celtic at the age of 12, from there he climbed through the ranks before being promoted to the reserves side playing in the Lowland League. Making his debut, against Gala Fairydean Rovers on 1 October 2022, before scoring his first senior goal in a 7–0 win over Civil Service Strollers in January of the following season.

On 1 August 2025, Robertson joined Scottish League One side, Inverness Caledonian Thistle on a season long loan, making his debut a day later, in a 3–0 away win over Kelty Hearts. Robertson scored his first professional goal in a 1–0 home win against Cove Rangers on 8 November.

In January 2026, Robertson signed a pre-contract agreement with then-Premiership side, Livingston.

== Honours ==
Inverness Caledonian Thistle

- Scottish League One: 2025–26
