= Miller Keir =

Scottish footballer (born 2006)

Personal information
- Date of birth: 18 November 2006 (age 19)
- Place of birth: Aberdeen, Scotland
- Position: Forward

Team information
- Current team: Cove Rangers (on loan from Inverness Caledonian Thistle)

Youth career
- –2025: Hall Russell United

Senior career*
Years	Team	Apps	(Gls)
2025–2026	Turriff United	33	(28)
2025	→ Hall Russell United (loan)		
2026–	Inverness Caledonian Thistle	2	(0)
2026–	→ Cove Rangers (loan)	2	(0)
- * Club domestic league appearances and goals as of 13:11, 18 October 2026 (UTC)

Miller Keir (born 18 November 2006) is a Scottish professional footballer who plays as a forward for Scottish League One club, Cove Rangers, on loan from Scottish Championship side, Inverness Caledonian Thistle.

== Career ==
=== Hall Russell United and Turriff United ===
Born in Aberdeen, Keir started his career at Hall Russell United in the North of Scotland Football League, before joining Highland League side Turriff United, before immediately returning to Hall Russell United on loan for the remainder of the season.

The following season, his first full season at the club, Keir finished as the league's top goalscorer, having scored 28 goals in 33 appearances.

=== Inverness Caledonian Thistle ===
Following his impressive tally the season prior, Keir was offered a trial from Scottish League One side, Ross County, an offer he went on to turn down.

On 20 July 2026, Keir signed for Scottish Championship side, Inverness Caledonian Thistle, for a reported £30,000.

Keir went on to make his debut for Inverness on 8 August 2026, coming on in the 87th minute in a 0–0 away draw to Arbroath in the league.

On 18 September 2026, Keir joined Scottish League One side, Cove Rangers on a half season loan.
