= Calum MacLeod (footballer) =

Sottish footballer (born 2006)

Calum Macleod
Personal information
- Full name: Calum Macleod
- Date of birth: 25 May 2006 (age 20)
- Place of birth: Inverness, Scotland
- Position: Midfielder

Team information
- Current team: Inverness Caledonian Thistle
- Number: 2

Youth career
- –2022: Inverness Caledonian Thistle

Senior career*
Years	Team	Apps	(Gls)
2022–	Inverness Caledonian Thistle	67	(6)
2024	→ Clachnacuddin (loan)	13	(2)

International career^{‡}
2026–	Scotland U21	2	(0)
- * Club domestic league appearances and goals as of 12:53, 18 October 2026 (UTC) ‡ National team caps and goals as of 07:48, 21 November 2026 (UTC)

Calum Macleod (born 25 May 2006) is a Scottish professional footballer who plays for Inverness Caledonian Thistle in Scottish League One.

== Career ==
MacLeod started his career with his hometown team, Inverness Caledonian Thistle, playing his way through the youth setup until 2022, when he was given a professional contract with the club. MacLeod made his debut for the club later that year in October 2022, featuring in an injury ravaged side, as Inverness lost 2–0 away to Hamilton Academical in the Scottish Challenge Cup.

In February 2024, MacLeod was sent on loan to fellow Invernesian side, Clachnacuddin, in the Highland League, scoring on his debut in a 3–2 away defeat to Rothes.

On 3 August 2024, MacLeod made his professional league debut in a 1–1 home draw against Dumbarton. On 14 September 2024, MacLeod scored his first professional goal in a 2–2 away draw to Alloa Athletic.

== International career ==
On 4 November 2026, MacLeod and fellow Inverness player, Alfie Stewart, were called up for the Scotland U-21 squad ahead of friendlies against Ukraine and the United States.
