= Chanka Zimba =

English footballer (born 2001)

Personal information
- Full name: Chanka Solomon Zimba
- Date of birth: 29 December 2001 (age 24)
- Place of birth: Zambia
- Position: Striker

Team information
- Current team: Vitória de Sernache

Youth career
- Blackburn Rovers
- 2020–2021: Cardiff City

Senior career*
Years	Team	Apps	(Gls)
2021–2024	Cardiff City	1	(0)
2022	→ Northampton Town (loan)	12	(1)
2022	→ Newport County (loan)	13	(0)
2023–2024	→ Maidenhead United (loan)	24	(4)
2024–2025	Marine	5	(0)
2025–2026	Inverness Caledonian Thistle	32	(11)
2026–	Vitória de Sernache	0	(0)

International career^{‡}
2026–	Zambia	2	(0)
- * Club domestic league appearances and goals as of 10:10, 3 May 2026 (UTC) ‡ National team caps and goals as of 17:52, 26 September 2026 (UTC)

Chanka Solomon Zimba (born 29 December 2001) is a Zambian professional footballer who plays as a striker for Liga 3 club Vitória de Sernache, and the Zambia national team.

== Early and personal life ==
Zimba was born in Zambia.

== Club career ==
Zimba began his career with Blackburn Rovers; he was released in summer 2020, and signed with Cardiff City in September 2020. He was called to the first-team for the first time in December 2020, due to injury problems and suspensions. He signed a new contract with the club in August 2021. He made his senior debut on 20 November 2021.

Zimba moved on on loan to Northampton Town in January 2022. In July 2022 he joined Newport County on loan for the 2022–23 season. Zimba made his debut for Newport on 30 July 2022 in the 1–1 League Two draw against Sutton United as a second-half substitute. He scored his first goal for Newport on 9 August 2022 in the 3–2 EFL Cup first round win against Luton Town. He was released back to his parent club by Newport on 29 December 2022.

In August 2023, Zimba joined Maidenhead United on loan until January 2024. The loan was later extended until the end of the season.

He was released by Cardiff at the end of the 2023–24 season.

In September 2024, Zimba joined National League North club Marine.

On 1 August 2025, Zimba signed for Scottish League One club Inverness Caledonian Thistle. On 25 May 2026 it was announced that Zimba was one of 9 players who would be leaving Inverness upon the expiration of his contract.

On 3 November 2026, Zimba signed for Portuguese Liga 3 side, Vitória de Sernache.

== International career ==
Zimba made his debut for Zambia in a friendly against Argentina on 31 March 2026.

== Career statistics ==
As of match played 2 May 2026

Appearances and goals by club, season and competition
Club	Season	League			National Cup		League Cup		Other		Total	
Club	Season	Division	Apps	Goals	Apps	Goals	Apps	Goals	Apps	Goals	Apps	Goals
Cardiff City	2021–22	Championship	1	0	0	0	0	0	—		1	0
Cardiff City	2022–23	Championship	0	0	0	0	0	0	—		0	0
Cardiff City	2023–24	Championship	0	0	0	0	0	0	—		0	0
Cardiff City	Total		1	0	0	0	0	0	0	0	1	0
Northampton Town (loan)	2021–22	League Two	12	1	0	0	0	0	1 (Note: Appearance in League Two play-offs)	0	13	1
Newport County (loan)	2022–23	League Two	13	0	1	0	3	1	3 (Note: Appearance(s) in the EFL Trophy.)	1	20	2
Maidenhead United (loan)	2023–24	National League	24	4	0	0	0	0	0	0	24	4
Marine	2024–25	National League North	5	0	0	0	0	0	0	0	5	0
Inverness Caledonian Thistle	2025–26	Scottish League One	32	11	2	1	0	0	9 (Note: Appearances in the Scottish League Challenge Cup)	7	43	19
Vitória de Sernache	2026–27	Liga 3	0	0	0	0	0	0	0	0	0	0
Career total			87	16	3	1	3	1	13	8	106	26
