= Alfie Bavidge =

Scottish footballer

Personal information
- Full name: Alfie Bavidge
- Date of birth: 11 April 2006 (age 20)
- Place of birth: Aberdeen, Scotland
- Position: Striker

Team information
- Current team: Inverness Caledonian Thistle (on loan from Aberdeen)

Youth career
- Dyce Boys Club
- 2014–: Aberdeen

Senior career*
| Years | Team | Apps | (Gls) |
| 2022– | Aberdeen | 5 | (0) |
| 2023–2024 | → Kelty Hearts (loan) | 25 | (9) |
| 2024–2025 | → Ayr United (loan) | 14 | (2) |
| 2025 | → Inverness Caledonian Thistle (loan) | 10 | (6) |
| 2025–2026 | → Inverness Caledonian Thistle (loan) | 36 | (10) |
| 2026– | → Inverness Caledonian Thistle (loan) | 0 | (0) |

International career^{‡}
- Scotland U16
| 2022–2023 | Scotland U17 | 5 | (2) |
| 2023– | Scotland U19 | 19 | (3) |
- * Club domestic league appearances and goals as of 21:52, 27 June 2026 (UTC) ‡ National team caps and goals as of 4 September 2025

Alfie Bavidge (born 11 April 2006) is a Scottish footballer who plays as a striker for Scottish Championship side Inverness Caledonian Thistle, on loan from Scottish Premiership side Aberdeen.

== Career ==
Bavidge started his career with Aberdeen. After impressing in the academy, scoring plenty of goals along the way, he made his League debut on 4 February 2023, coming on as a second-half substitute in a 3–1 win against Motherwell.

In September 2023, Bavidge joined Scottish League One club Kelty Hearts on loan until January 2024.

On 3 February 2024, Bavidge scored his first career hat-trick in a 3-0 away win over Edinburgh City. He followed this up just 13 days later with another hat-trick, this time for Scotland U-19 in a 4-0 win against Latvia.

In August 2024, Bavidge joined Scottish Championship club Ayr United on loan for the season.

In January 2025, Bavidge was recalled from his loan at Ayr United and immediately joined Inverness Caledonian Thistle (for whom his father had also played), scoring on his debut.

On 1 August 2025, Bavidge returned to Inverness on a season long loan.

On 26 June 2026, Bavidge returned to Inverness for the third consecutive season, on a season long loan.

== Personal life ==
Alfie is the son of former professional footballer Martin Bavidge; his grandfather Mitch Bavidge also played at a high level, mainly in the Highland Football League. His brother, Sam, is also a footballer, currently playing at Banks o' Dee in the Highland League.

== Career statistics ==
=== Club ===
As of match played 11 October 2025

| Club | Season | League | | | Scottish Cup | | Scottish League Cup | | Continental | | Other | | Total | |
| Club | Season | Division | Apps | Goals | Apps | Goals | Apps | Goals | Apps | Goals | Apps | Goals | Apps | Goals |
|---|---|---|---|---|---|---|---|---|---|---|---|---|---|---|
| Aberdeen B | 2022–23 | — | | | — | | — | | — | | 1 (Note: Appearance(s) in Scottish Challenge Cup) | 0 | 1 | 0 |
| Aberdeen B | 2023–24 | — | | | — | | — | | — | | 1 | 1 | 1 | 1 |
| Aberdeen B | 2024–25 | — | | | — | | — | | — | | 1 | 0 | 1 | 0 |
| Aberdeen B | Total | | — | | — | | — | | — | | 3 | 1 | 3 | 1 |
| Aberdeen | 2022–23 | Scottish Premiership | 5 | 0 | 0 | 0 | 0 | 0 | — | | — | | 5 | 0 |
| Aberdeen | 2023–24 | Scottish Premiership | 0 | 0 | 0 | 0 | 0 | 0 | 0 | 0 | — | | 0 | 0 |
| Aberdeen | 2024–25 | Scottish Premiership | 0 | 0 | 0 | 0 | 0 | 0 | — | | — | | 0 | 0 |
| Aberdeen | 2025–26 | Scottish Premiership | 0 | 0 | 0 | 0 | 0 | 0 | 0 | 0 | — | | 0 | 0 |
| Aberdeen | Total | | 5 | 0 | 0 | 0 | 0 | 0 | 0 | 0 | — | | 5 | 0 |
| Kelty Hearts (loan) | 2023–24 | Scottish League One | 25 | 9 | 1 | 0 | 0 | 0 | — | | 0 | 0 | 26 | 9 |
| Ayr United (loan) | 2024–25 | Scottish Championship | 14 | 2 | 1 | 0 | 0 | 0 | — | | 0 | 0 | 15 | 2 |
| Inverness Caledonian Thistle (loan) | 2024–25 | Scottish League One | 10 | 6 | — | | — | | — | | — | | 10 | 6 |
| Inverness Caledonian Thistle (loan) | 2025–26 | Scottish League One | 9 | 3 | 0 | 0 | 0 | 0 | — | | 4 | 3 | 13 | 6 |
| Career total | | | 63 | 20 | 2 | 0 | 0 | 0 | 0 | 0 | 7 | 4 | 72 | 24 |
