= 2026–27 Scottish League Cup group stage =

2026–27 Scottish League Cup (group stage)
Tournament details
- Country: Scotland
- Dates: 11 July 2026 – 26 July 2026
- Teams: 40

Tournament statistics
- Matches played: 80
- Goals scored: 243 (3.04 per match)
- Top goal scorer(s): Cameron Elliott; Kevin Nisbet (6 goals)
- All statistics correct as of 26 July 2026.

The 2026–27 Scottish League Cup group stage was played from 11 July to 26 July 2026.

== Format ==
The competition began with eight groups of five teams; each team playing one match against each other team in their group, either home or away, for a total of two home and two away matches. The five clubs initially competing in the UEFA Champions League (Celtic and Heart of Midlothian), Europa League (Rangers) and Conference League (Motherwell and Hibernian) receive a bye to the second round. The group stage consisted of 40 teams: all remaining teams that competed across the SPFL in 2025–26, the 2025–26 Highland Football League champions (Brora Rangers) and runners-up (Brechin City), and the 2025–26 Lowland Football League champions (Linlithgow Rose).

The winners of each of the eight groups, as well as the three best runners-up, progressed to the second round (last 16). At this stage, the competition reverts to the traditional knock-out format. The three group winners with the highest points total and the European entrants are seeded.

The traditional point system of awarding three points for a win and one point for a draw is used. In addition, for each group stage match that finish in a draw, a penalty shoot-out took place, with the winner being awarded a bonus point.

The draw for the group stage took place on 27 May 2026 and was broadcast live on the Premier Sports Player and SPFL YouTube channel.

== Teams ==
The teams were seeded according to their final league positions in 2025–26 and drawn into eight groups, with each group comprising one team from each pot.

=== Seeding ===
Pot 1	Pot 2	Pot 3	Pot 4	Pot 5
01. Falkirk; 02. Dundee United; 03. Dundee; 04. Aberdeen; 05. Kilmarnock; 06. St Mirren; 07. Livingston; 08. St Johnstone	09. Partick Thistle; 10. Arbroath; 11. Dunfermline Athletic; 12. Raith Rovers; 13. Queen's Park; 14. Ayr United; 15. Greenock Morton; 16. Airdrieonians	17. Ross County; 18. Inverness Caledonian Thistle; 19. Stenhousemuir; 20. Queen of the South; 21. Alloa Athletic; 22. Peterhead; 23. Montrose; 24. Cove Rangers	25. East Fife; 26. Hamilton Academical; 27. Kelty Hearts; 28. East Kilbride; 29. The Spartans; 30. Clyde; 31. Forfar Athletic; 32. Stranraer	33. Elgin City; 34. Annan Athletic; 35. Stirling Albion; 36. Dumbarton; 37. Edinburgh City; 38. Linlithgow Rose; 39. Brora Rangers; 40. Brechin City

== Group stage ==
The draw was completed on 27 May 2026. All times are BST (UTC +1).

=== Group A ===
Pos	Team	Pld	W	PW	PL	L	GF	GA	GD	Pts	Qualification	ABE	QPA	KEL	QOS	BRO
1	Aberdeen	4	4	0	0	0	11	2	+9	12	Qualification for the second round	—	2–1	3–0	—	—
2	Queen's Park	4	3	0	0	1	9	4	+5	9		—	—	—	3–1	3–1
3	Kelty Hearts	4	1	1	0	2	4	8	−4	5		—	0–2	—	—	3–2
4	Queen of the South	4	1	0	1	2	6	8	−2	4		1–4	—	1–1p	—	—
5	Brora Rangers	4	0	0	0	4	3	11	−8	0		0–2	—	—	0–3	—

Rules for classification: 1) goal difference, 2) goals scored, 3) away goals scored, 4) matches won, 5) away matches won, 6) drawing of lots.

==== Matches ====
11 July 2026
15:00

Queen of the South	1–1	Kelty Hearts
Clark 31'		Cunningham 28'
Penalties
Stott (penalty missed); MacKenzie (penalty missed); Charters (penalty scored); Smith (penalty scored); Luissint (penalty scored); Hannah (penalty missed)	3–4	(penalty missed) Cunningham; (penalty scored) McManus; (penalty scored) Ferguson; (penalty scored) Higginbotham; (penalty missed) Moore; (penalty scored) Corr

Palmerston Park, Dumfries
Attendance: 587
Referee: George Calder
11 July 2026
15:00

Queen's Park	3–1	Brora Rangers
Connolly 27'; Ruth 62'; Todorov 73'		Nixon 16'

Lesser Hampden, Glasgow
Attendance: 439
Referee: Joel Kennedy
14 July 2026
19:45

Brora Rangers	0–2	Aberdeen
		Nisbet 35' (pen.), 76'

Dudgeon Park, Brora
Attendance: 1,500
Referee: Josh Hay
14 July 2026
19:45

Kelty Hearts	0–2	Queen's Park
		Connolly 72'; Hamilton 77'

New Central Park, Kelty
Attendance: 299
Referee: Greg Soutar
18 July 2026
15:00

Brora Rangers	0–3	Queen of the South
		Clark 14'; Smith 69', 72'

Dudgeon Park, Brora
Attendance: 252
Referee: Daniel Graves
18 July 2026
17:00

Aberdeen	2–1	Queen's Park
Happe 3'; Smith 11'		Hamilton 61'

Pittodrie Stadium, Aberdeen
Attendance: 7,350
Referee: Colin Steven
21 July 2026
19:45

Kelty Hearts	3–2	Brora Rangers
Shanley 10', 37'; Moffett 90'		Bunce 29'; Wallace 65'

New Central Park, Kelty
Attendance: 136
Referee: Euan Birch
22 July 2026
19:45

Queen of the South	1–4	Aberdeen
Clark 14'		Nisbet 37' (pen.), 70', 72'; Lyons 82'

Palmerston Park, Dumfries
Attendance: 1,647
Referee: Lloyd Wilson
25 July 2026
15:00

Aberdeen	3–0	Kelty Hearts
Nisbet 2' (pen.); Kjartansson 27'; Olusanya 50'

Pittodrie Stadium, Aberdeen
Attendance: 7,078
Referee: Ryan Lee
25 July 2026
15:00

Queen's Park	3–1	Queen of the South
Ruth 9' (pen.); McDonnell 33'; Shiels 89'		Johnstone 45+1'

Lesser Hampden, Glasgow
Attendance: 685
Referee: Alastair Grieve

=== Group B ===
Pos	Team	Pld	W	PW	PL	L	GF	GA	GD	Pts	Qualification	DUN	MON	ARB	STI	SPA
1	Dundee United	4	3	0	0	1	8	1	+7	9	Qualification for the second round	—	—	3–0	—	4–0
2	Montrose	4	3	0	0	1	5	2	+3	9		1–0	—	—	—	0–2
3	Arbroath	4	2	0	0	2	3	6	−3	6		—	0–2	—	1–0	—
4	Stirling Albion	4	1	0	0	3	3	5	−2	3		0–1	0–2	—	—	—
5	The Spartans	4	1	0	0	3	4	9	−5	3		—	—	1–2	1–3	—

Rules for classification: 1) goal difference, 2) goals scored, 3) away goals scored, 4) matches won, 5) away matches won, 6) drawing of lots.

==== Matches ====
11 July 2026
15:00

The Spartans	1–2	Arbroath
Whyte 55'		Winter 39'; Flynn 85'

Ainslie Park, Edinburgh
Attendance: 383
Referee: Alastair Grieve
11 July 2026
17:30

Stirling Albion	0–1	Dundee United
		Sapsford 90' (pen.)

Forthbank Stadium, Stirling
Attendance: 1,553
Referee: Grant Irvine
14 July 2026
19:45

Montrose	1–0	Dundee United
Webster 37'

Links Park, Montrose
Attendance: 1,454
Referee: Ross Hardie
14 July 2026
19:45

The Spartans	1–3	Stirling Albion
Whyte 4'		McNab 43'; Allan 54'; McLean 62'

Ainslie Park, Edinburgh
Attendance: 280
Referee: Ross Birrell
18 July 2026
15:00

Stirling Albion	0–2	Montrose
		Loudon 28' (pen.); Lyons 30'

Forthbank Stadium, Stirling
Attendance: 735
Referee: Lewis Hogarth
18 July 2026
19:00

Dundee United	3–0	Arbroath
Sapsford 37'; Metsoko 54'; Rose 68'

Tannadice Park, Dundee
Attendance: 2,922
Referee: Jamie Wilkie
21 July 2026
19:45

Arbroath	0–2	Montrose
		Loudon 19', 28'

Gayfield Park, Arbroath
Attendance: 1,213
Referee: Iain Snedden
21 July 2026
19:45

Dundee United	4–0	The Spartans
Rose 26', 64'; Tait 73'; Sapsford 90'

Tannadice Park, Dundee
Attendance: 2,205
Referee: Dan McFarlane
25 July 2026
15:00

Arbroath	1–0	Stirling Albion
Dow 60'

Gayfield Park, Arbroath
Attendance: 674
Referee: Colin Steven
25 July 2026
15:00

Montrose	0–2	The Spartans
		Craigen 11'; Ross 77'

Links Park, Montrose
Attendance: 574
Referee: George Calder

=== Group C ===
Pos	Team	Pld	W	PW	PL	L	GF	GA	GD	Pts	Qualification	STM	DNF	EKB	DUM	COV
1	St Mirren	4	3	0	0	1	12	4	+8	9	Qualification for the second round	—	0–1	4–3	—	—
2	Dunfermline Athletic	4	3	0	0	1	10	4	+6	9	Qualification for the second round	—	—	—	4–1	5–0
3	East Kilbride	4	2	0	0	2	13	10	+3	6		—	3–0	—	5–3	—
4	Dumbarton	4	1	0	0	3	6	13	−7	3		0–4	—	—	—	2–0
5	Cove Rangers	4	1	0	0	3	3	13	−10	3		0–4	—	3–2	—	—

Rules for classification: 1) goal difference, 2) goals scored, 3) away goals scored, 4) matches won, 5) away matches won, 6) drawing of lots.

==== Matches ====
11 July 2026
15:00

Dumbarton	0–4	St Mirren
		Ramos 7', 73'; Mochrie 39'; Falconer 77'

Cliftonhill, Coatbridge
Attendance: 591
Referee: Lloyd Wilson
11 July 2026
15:00

East Kilbride	3–0	Dunfermline Athletic
McGrattan 24'; Gray 54'; Elliott 75'

K-Park Training Academy, East Kilbride
Attendance: 685
Referee: Matthew MacDermid
14 July 2026
19:45

Cove Rangers	3–2	East Kilbride
Oladipo 53'; McAllister 56'; Barry 84'		Foster 48'; Harrington 72' (o.g.)

Balmoral Stadium, Aberdeen
Attendance: 305
Referee: Joel Kennedy
14 July 2026
19:45

Dunfermline Athletic	4–1	Dumbarton
A.Tod 26', 69'; Shaw 38'; Cooper 84'		Kirkpatrick 60'

East End Park, Dunfermline
Attendance: 1,375
Referee: Lewis Hogarth
18 July 2026
15:00

Cove Rangers	0–4	St Mirren
		Idowu 31' (pen.); Ramos 42'; Douglas 81'; Calvin 85'

Balmoral Stadium, Aberdeen
Attendance: 722
Referee: Greg Soutar
18 July 2026
15:00

East Kilbride	5–3	Dumbarton
Elliott 30', 38', 45'; O'Connor 83'; McGuffie 90' (pen.)		McIntosh 15', 81'; Honeyman 69'

K-Park Training Academy, East Kilbride
Attendance: 445
Referee: Mark Daly
21 July 2026
19:45

Dunfermline Athletic	5–0	Cove Rangers
A.Tod 5', 68'; Shaw 15', 33'; Cooper 81'

East End Park, Dunfermline
Attendance: 1,854
Referee: Abbie Hendry
21 July 2026
19:45

St Mirren	4–3	East Kilbride
Sule 60' (pen.); Carr 69'; Phillips 77'; Dijksteel 90'		Elliott 32' (pen.), 39'; McGuffie 57' (pen.)

St Mirren Park, Paisley
Attendance: 2,614
Referee: Ross Hardie
25 July 2026
15:00

Dumbarton	2–0	Cove Rangers
McIntosh 5'; Lang 64'

Cliftonhill, Coatbridge
Attendance: 124
Referee: Graham Grainger
26 July 2026
15:00

St Mirren	0–1	Dunfermline Athletic
		Kane 88' (pen.)

St Mirren Park, Paisley
Attendance: 3,466
Referee: Sean Murdoch

=== Group D ===
Pos	Team	Pld	W	PW	PL	L	GF	GA	GD	Pts	Qualification	ROS	DND	CLY	AIR	ANN
1	Ross County	4	3	1	0	0	11	3	+8	11	Qualification for the second round	—	p1–1	3–1	—	—
2	Dundee	4	3	0	1	0	14	3	+11	10	Qualification for the second round	—	—	4–0	4–2	—
3	Clyde	4	2	0	0	2	6	8	−2	6		—	—	—	1–0	4–1
4	Airdrieonians	4	1	0	0	3	5	8	−3	3		0–3	—	—	—	3–0
5	Annan Athletic	4	0	0	0	4	2	16	−14	0		1–4	0–5	—	—	—

Rules for classification: 1) goal difference, 2) goals scored, 3) away goals scored, 4) matches won, 5) away matches won, 6) drawing of lots.

==== Matches ====
11 July 2026
15:00

Annan Athletic	1–4	Ross County
Smith 85'		Graham 31' (pen.), 48'; Muirhead 73' (o.g.); Randall 75'

Galabank, Annan
Attendance: 402
Referee: Mark Daly
11 July 2026
15:00

Dundee	4–2	Airdrieonians
Reilly 31'; Hamilton 55'; Bevan 74'; Hay 80'		Sharp 11' (o.g.); Fisher 45'

Dens Park, Dundee
Attendance: 1,807
Referee: Duncan Nicolson
14 July 2026
19:45

Annan Athletic	0–5	Dundee
		Reilly 55', 62'; Bevan 68'; Murray 74'; Hay 80'

Galabank, Annan
Attendance: 451
Referee: Colin Steven
14 July 2026
19:45

Clyde	1–0	Airdrieonians
Connell 65'

New Douglas Park, Hamilton
Attendance: 452
Referee: Euan Birch
18 July 2026
15:00

Airdrieonians	3–0	Annan Athletic
Taylor 38'; Bridge 63'; Lister 73'

Excelsior Stadium, Airdrie
Attendance: 205
Referee: Matthew MacDermid
18 July 2026
15:00

Ross County	3–1	Clyde
Graham 2', 56' (pen.); Chin 5'		Cannon 20'

Victoria Park, Dingwall
Attendance: 929
Referee: Gary Hanvidge
21 July 2026
19:45

Clyde	4–1	Annan Athletic
Connell 2', 4', 30' (pen.); Redfern 39'		Roy 34'

New Douglas Park, Hamilton
Attendance: 243
Referee: Jordan Curran
21 July 2026
19:45

Ross County	1–1	Dundee
Graham 55'		Robertson 20'
Penalties
Graham (penalty scored); Phillips (penalty scored); Lindsay (penalty missed); Strapp (penalty scored); Docherty (penalty scored); Cornelius (penalty scored); McCarvel (penalty scored); Wright (penalty scored)	7–6	(penalty scored) Murray; (penalty scored) Hay; (penalty missed) Hamilton; (penalty scored) Westley; (penalty scored) Forrest; (penalty scored) Robertson; (penalty scored) Astley; (penalty missed) Odutayo

Victoria Park, Dingwall
Attendance: 1,111
Referee: Sean Murdoch
25 July 2026
15:00

Airdrieonians	0–3	Ross County
		Lindsay 21'; Turner 51'; Jamieson 76'

Excelsior Stadium, Airdrie
Attendance: 601
Referee: Abbie Hendry
25 July 2026
15:00

Dundee	4–0	Clyde
Forrest 48'; Murray 70' (pen.); Westley 75', 84'

Dens Park, Dundee
Attendance: 1,942
Referee: Matthew MacDermid

=== Group E ===
Pos	Team	Pld	W	PW	PL	L	GF	GA	GD	Pts	Qualification	STE	PAR	LIV	FOR	BRE
1	Stenhousemuir	4	2	2	0	0	6	3	+3	10	Qualification for the second round	—	—	p0–0	2–0	—
2	Partick Thistle	4	2	1	1	0	13	3	+10	9	Qualification for the second round	2–2p	—	—	—	6–0
3	Livingston	4	2	0	2	0	11	1	+10	8		—	1–1p	—	8–0	—
4	Forfar Athletic	4	1	0	0	3	3	15	−12	3		—	0–4	—	—	3–1
5	Brechin City	4	0	0	0	4	2	13	−11	0		1–2	—	0–2	—	—

Rules for classification: 1) goal difference, 2) goals scored, 3) away goals scored, 4) matches won, 5) away matches won, 6) drawing of lots.

==== Matches ====
11 July 2026
15:00

Partick Thistle	6–0	Brechin City
Mackay-Steven 7', 28'; Smyth 22' (pen.); Fitzpatrick 58'; Drozd 66'; Henderson 67'

Firhill Stadium, Glasgow
Attendance: 2,063
Referee: Steven McLean
11 July 2026
15:00

Stenhousemuir	2–0	Forfar Athletic
Hodgkiss 66'; Aitken 68'

Ochilview Park, Stenhousemuir
Attendance: 304
Referee: Ryan Lee
14 July 2026
19:45

Brechin City	0–2	Livingston
		Sinclair 3'; Muirhead 28'

Glebe Park, Brechin
Attendance: 307
Referee: Alastair Grieve
14 July 2026
19:45

Forfar Athletic	0–4	Partick Thistle
		Drozd 4' (pen.); Samuel 6'; O'Reilly 16'; Letsosa 90'

Station Park, Forfar
Attendance: 467
Referee: Sean Murdoch
18 July 2026
15:00

Brechin City	1–2	Stenhousemuir
Hilson 43'		Anderson 9'; Carrick 45'

Glebe Park, Brechin
Attendance: 307
Referee: Joel Kennedy
18 July 2026
15:00

Livingston	1–1	Partick Thistle
Muirhead 60'		Samuel 80'
Penalties
Muirhead (penalty scored); Boggan (penalty missed); Trialist (penalty scored); Wilkie (penalty missed); Kerr (penalty missed)	2–3	(penalty scored) Smyth; (penalty missed) Drozd; (penalty scored) Fitzpatrick; (penalty scored) Samuel

Almondvale Stadium, Livingston
Attendance: 1,536
Referee: Josh Hay
21 July 2026
19:45

Livingston	8–0	Forfar Athletic
Sinclair 11'; Trialist 19', 78'; Muirhead 30', 50'; May 35'; Denholm 53'; Boggan 73'

Almondvale Stadium, Livingston
Attendance: 578
Referee: Graham Grainger
21 July 2026
19:45

Partick Thistle	2–2	Stenhousemuir
Smyth 33'; Watt 81'		O'Reilly 6' (pen.); Penman 23'
Penalties
Smyth (penalty scored); Fitzpatrick (penalty missed); Watt (penalty scored); Mackay-Steven (penalty scored)	3–5	(penalty scored) Buchanan; (penalty scored) Meechan; (penalty scored) Gillies; (penalty scored) Aitken; (penalty scored) O'Donnell

Firhill Stadium, Glasgow
Attendance: 2,046
Referee: Daniel Graves
25 July 2026
15:00

Forfar Athletic	3–1	Brechin City
Shepherd 30' (pen.); Rennie 32', 86'		Martin 84'

Station Park, Forfar
Attendance: 585
Referee: Iain Snedden
25 July 2026
15:00

Stenhousemuir	0–0	Livingston
Penalties
Buchanan (penalty scored); O'Reilly (penalty missed); Gillies (penalty scored); Meechan (penalty missed); Bright (penalty scored)	3–1	(penalty missed) Muirhead; (penalty scored) MacPherson; (penalty missed) May; (penalty missed) Kerr

Ochilview Park, Stenhousemuir
Attendance: 599
Referee: Lloyd Wilson

=== Group F ===
Pos	Team	Pld	W	PW	PL	L	GF	GA	GD	Pts	Qualification	ICT	EFI	STJ	LIN	MOR
1	Inverness Caledonian Thistle	4	3	1	0	0	5	1	+4	11	Qualification for the second round	—	p1–1	1–0	—	—
2	East Fife	4	2	1	1	0	7	3	+4	9		—	—	—	3–1	2–0
3	St Johnstone	4	2	0	1	1	6	2	+4	7		—	1–1p	—	—	3–0
4	Linlithgow Rose	4	1	0	0	3	2	7	−5	3		0–2	—	0–2	—	—
5	Greenock Morton	4	0	0	0	4	0	7	−7	0		0–1	—	—	0–1	—

Rules for classification: 1) goal difference, 2) goals scored, 3) away goals scored, 4) matches won, 5) away matches won, 6) drawing of lots.

==== Matches ====
11 July 2026
15:00

Greenock Morton	0–1	Linlithgow Rose
		Rae 58'

Cappielow, Greenock
Attendance: 1,095
Referee: Peter Stuart
11 July 2026
15:00

Inverness Caledonian Thistle	1–1	East Fife
MacKinnon 90'		Gaffney 34'
Penalties
Shinnie (penalty scored); Wotherspoon (penalty scored); Kargbo (penalty scored); Bates (penalty scored); Longstaff (penalty scored)	5–3	(penalty scored) Peggie; (penalty missed) Hamilton; (penalty scored) Slattery; (penalty scored) Wilson

Caledonian Stadium, Inverness
Attendance: 823
Referee: Sean Murdoch
14 July 2026
19:45

East Fife	2–0	Greenock Morton
Milne 32'; Austin 33'

Bayview Stadium, Methil
Attendance: 344
Referee: Abbie Hendry
14 July 2026
19:45

Linlithgow Rose	0–2	St Johnstone
		Fotheringham 8'; Paton 30'

Prestonfield, Linlithgow
Attendance: 1,218
Referee: Gary Hanvidge
18 July 2026
15:00

Linlithgow Rose	0–2	Inverness Caledonian Thistle
		Duncan 17'; Boutin 38'

Prestonfield, Linlithgow
Attendance: 747
Referee: Iain Snedden
18 July 2026
15:00

St Johnstone	3–0	Greenock Morton
Gullan 62' (pen.), 89' (pen.); McAlear 72'

McDiarmid Park, Perth
Attendance: 2,040
Referee: David Dickinson
21 July 2026
19:45

East Fife	3–1	Linlithgow Rose
Austin 57', 67'; Slattery 83'		Berry 3'

Bayview Stadium, Methil
Attendance: 484
Referee: Ross Birrell
21 July 2026
19:45

Inverness Caledonian Thistle	1–0	St Johnstone
Stewart 16'

Caledonian Stadium, Inverness
Attendance: 1,253
Referee: Cameron Stirling
25 July 2026
15:00

Greenock Morton	0–1	Inverness Caledonian Thistle
		Bavidge 14' (pen.)

Cappielow, Greenock
Attendance: 864
Referee: Ross Hardie
25 July 2026
15:00

St Johnstone	1–1	East Fife
Stanton 90+1'		Healy 90+5'
Penalties
Paton (penalty scored); McAlear (penalty scored); Stanton (penalty missed); Fotheringham (penalty scored); Fowler (penalty scored); Tait (penalty missed)	4–5	(penalty scored) Trialist; (penalty missed) Munro; (penalty scored) Healy; (penalty scored) Wilson; (penalty scored) Newton; (penalty scored) Fairley

McDiarmid Park, Perth
Attendance: 2,223
Referee: Peter Stuart

=== Group G ===
Pos	Team	Pld	W	PW	PL	L	GF	GA	GD	Pts	Qualification	AYR	FAL	EDI	ALL	STR
1	Ayr United	4	4	0	0	0	11	3	+8	12	Qualification for the second round	—	—	3–0 (Note: Ayr United were awarded a technical 3−0 win over Edinburgh City, who fielded an ineligible player. The match had originally finished 2–0 to Ayr United.)	4–1	—
2	Falkirk	4	2	0	1	1	9	2	+7	7		0–1	—	—	—	3–0
3	Edinburgh City	4	2	0	0	2	4	8	−4	6		—	0–5	—	2–0	—
4	Alloa Athletic	4	0	2	0	2	3	8	−5	4		—	p1–1	—	—	p2–2
5	Stranraer	4	0	0	1	3	4	10	−6	1		2–3	—	0–2	—	—

Rules for classification: 1) goal difference, 2) goals scored, 3) away goals scored, 4) matches won, 5) away matches won, 6) drawing of lots.

==== Matches ====
11 July 2026
15:00

Edinburgh City	0–5	Falkirk
		MacIver 5', 88'; Parkinson 20', 26'; Allan 35'

Meadowbank Stadium, Edinburgh
Attendance: 649
Referee: Josh Hay
11 July 2026
15:00

Stranraer	2–3	Ayr United
Dolan 40' (pen.); Traynor 57'		Summers 49'; Taylor 60', 79' (pen.)

Stair Park, Stranraer
Attendance: 866
Referee: Iain Snedden
14 July 2026
19:45

Edinburgh City	2–0	Alloa Athletic
Leitch 2'; McKinlay 32'

Meadowbank Stadium, Edinburgh
Attendance: 90
Referee: George Calder
14 July 2026
19:45

Falkirk	0–1	Ayr United
		Holt 30'

Falkirk Stadium, Falkirk
Attendance: 1,973
Referee: Don Robertson
18 July 2026
15:00

Alloa Athletic	2–2	Stranraer
Rankin 62', 79'		Gillie 38'; Quigg 75'
Penalties
Taggart (penalty scored); Hetherington (penalty scored); Marchant (penalty scored); O'Donnell (penalty missed); Gallagher (penalty scored)	4–3	(penalty scored) Quigg; (penalty missed) Gillie; (penalty scored) Dolan; (penalty missed) Nair; (penalty scored) Clelland

Recreation Park, Alloa
Attendance: 241
Referee: Colin Steven
18 July 2026
15:00

Ayr United	3–0 (awarded)	Edinburgh City
Stirton 62'; Mitchell 77'

Somerset Park, Ayr
Attendance: 1,278
Referee: Nick Walsh
21 July 2026
19:45

Alloa Athletic	1–1	Falkirk
Glasgow 65'		Tanser 39'
Penalties
Taggart (penalty scored); Scougall (penalty scored); Marchant (penalty scored); Devine (penalty scored)	4–2	(penalty scored) Spencer; (penalty scored) Parkinson; (penalty missed) Strain; (penalty missed) Henderson

Recreation Park, Alloa
Attendance: 824
Referee: Greg Soutar
21 July 2026
19:45

Stranraer	0–2	Edinburgh City
		Leitch 31'; North 37'

Stair Park, Stranraer
Attendance: 291
Referee: Alastair Grieve
25 July 2026
15:00

Ayr United	4–1	Alloa Athletic
Stirton 15', 38'; Shanks 18' (pen.); Murphy 85'		O'Donnell 60'

Somerset Park, Ayr
Attendance: 1,226
Referee: John Beaton
25 July 2026
15:00

Falkirk	3–0	Stranraer
Strain 32'; Henderson 41'; Parkinson 59'

Falkirk Stadium, Falkirk
Attendance: 1,502
Referee: Lewis Hogarth

Notes

1. A: Ayr United were awarded a technical 3−0 win over Edinburgh City, who fielded an ineligible player. The match had originally finished 2–0 to Ayr United..

=== Group H ===
Pos	Team	Pld	W	PW	PL	L	GF	GA	GD	Pts	Qualification	KIL	HAM	RAI	PET	ELG
1	Kilmarnock	4	2	1	1	0	2	0	+2	9	Qualification for the second round	—	1–0	p0–0	—	—
2	Hamilton Academical	4	2	1	0	1	7	2	+5	8		—	—	p1–1	—	5–0
3	Raith Rovers	4	2	0	2	0	5	2	+3	8		—	—	—	1–0	3–1
4	Peterhead	4	1	1	0	2	3	3	0	5		p0–0	0–1	—	—	—
5	Elgin City	4	0	0	0	4	2	12	−10	0		0–1	—	—	1–3	—

Rules for classification: 1) goal difference, 2) goals scored, 3) away goals scored, 4) matches won, 5) away matches won, 6) drawing of lots.

==== Matches ====
11 July 2026
15:00

Peterhead	0–1	Hamilton Academical
		Newbury 33'

Balmoor Stadium, Peterhead
Attendance: 454
Referee: Jordan Curran
11 July 2026
15:00

Raith Rovers	3–1	Elgin City
Neill 28' (o.g.); Montagu 42'; Millen 73'		Colloty 62'

Stark's Park, Kirkcaldy
Attendance: 1,276
Referee: Dan McFarlane
14 July 2026
19:45

Elgin City	1–3	Peterhead
Girvan 24'		Kerr 59'; McGinn 62'; Ross 67'

Borough Briggs, Elgin
Attendance: 443
Referee: Graham Grainger
14 July 2026
19:45

Kilmarnock	0–0	Raith Rovers
Penalties
Hugill (penalty missed); Thomson (penalty scored); Ring (penalty scored); Owen (penalty scored); Mathurin (penalty scored)	4–2	(penalty scored) Vaughan; (penalty missed) Telfer; (penalty missed) Turner; (penalty scored) Millen

Beechwood Park, Auchinleck
Attendance: 1,441
Referee: David Dickinson
18 July 2026
15:00

Elgin City	0–1	Kilmarnock
		Hugill 90'

Borough Briggs, Elgin
Attendance: 909
Referee: Duncan Nicolson
18 July 2026
15:00

Hamilton Academical	1–1	Raith Rovers
Blues 32'		Vaughan 26' (pen.)
Penalties
Hendrie (penalty scored); Thomas (penalty scored); Trialist (penalty scored); MacDonald (penalty scored); Bannigan (penalty scored)	5–4	(penalty scored) Vaughan; (penalty scored) McMullan; (penalty scored) Robertson; (penalty scored) Millen; (penalty missed) Gibson

New Douglas Park, Hamilton
Attendance: 1,100
Referee: Chris Graham
21 July 2026
19:45

Kilmarnock	1–0	Hamilton Academical
Kiltie 60'

Beechwood Park, Auchinleck
Attendance: 1,343
Referee: Jamie Wilkie
21 July 2026
19:45

Raith Rovers	1–0	Peterhead
Easton 38'

Stark's Park, Kirkcaldy
Attendance: 935
Referee: Lewis Hogarth
25 July 2026
15:00

Hamilton Academical	5–0	Elgin City
Bannigan 23', 25' (pen.); Crookston 67'; Blues 81'; Ryan 84'

New Douglas Park, Hamilton
Attendance: 421
Referee: Josh Hay
25 July 2026
15:00

Peterhead	0–0	Kilmarnock
Penalties
Kerr (penalty scored); Forrest (penalty scored); Teklemichael (penalty scored); Mackie (penalty scored); Smith (penalty scored)	5–4	(penalty scored) Hugill; (penalty scored) John-Jules; (penalty scored) Kiltie; (penalty scored) Tshibola; (penalty missed) Mathurin

Balmoor Stadium, Peterhead
Attendance: 953
Referee: Jamie McCunnie

== Best runners-up ==
Pos	Grp	Team	Pld	W	PW	PL	L	GF	GA	GD	Pts	Qualification
1	D	Dundee	4	3	0	1	0	14	3	+11	10	Qualification for the second round
2	E	Partick Thistle	4	2	1	1	0	13	3	+10	9	Qualification for the second round
3	C	Dunfermline Athletic	4	3	0	0	1	10	4	+6	9	Qualification for the second round
4	A	Queen's Park	4	3	0	0	1	9	4	+5	9	
5	F	East Fife	4	2	1	1	0	7	3	+4	9	
6	B	Montrose	4	3	0	0	1	5	2	+3	9	
7	H	Hamilton Academical	4	2	1	0	1	7	2	+5	8	
8	G	Falkirk	4	2	0	1	1	9	2	+7	7	

Rules for classification: 1) goal difference, 2) goals scored, 3) away goals scored, 4) matches won, 5) away matches won, 6) drawing of lots.
