= 2026–27 St Mirren F.C. season =

Scottish football club season

St Mirren
2026–27 season
- Chairman: John Needham
- Manager: Craig McLeish
- Stadium: St Mirren Park
- League Cup: Second round
Home colours

The 2026–27 season is St Mirren's ninth consecutive season in the top tier of Scottish football. The club are also participating in the Scottish Cup and the League Cup.

== Results and fixtures ==
Win Draw Loss Postponed

=== Pre-season and friendlies ===
27 June 2026 Friendly	Arbroath	2–4	St Mirren	Arbroath
15:00 BST	Dow 16'; Reilly 88'	Report	Idowu 20', 32'; Richardson 55'; McCormick 58'	Stadium: Gayfield Park

1 July 2026 Friendly	St Mirren	1–3	Heart of Midlothian	San Pedro del Pinatar, Spain
	Falconer 78'	Report	Kartum 8'; Mato 30'; Wilson 80'	Stadium: Pinatar Arena; Attendance: 0

=== Scottish Premiership ===
1 August 2026 1	Falkirk	0–2	St Mirren	Falkirk
15:00 BST		Report	Phillips 11', 87'	Stadium: Falkirk Stadium; Attendance: 7,058; Referee: Duncan Nicolson

8 August 2026 2	St Mirren	1–0	St Johnstone	Paisley
15:00 BST	Phillips 73' (pen.)	Report		Stadium: St Mirren Park; Attendance: 6,544; Referee: Ross Hardie

30 August 2026 3	St Mirren	3–3	Motherwell	Paisley
15:00 BST	Nsio 39'; John 44'; Ramos 45+4'	Report	Maswanhise 2'; Charles-Cook 24'; Kanga 90+3'	Stadium: St Mirren Park; Attendance: 5,295; Referee: Kevin Clancy

2 September 2026 4	Kilmarnock	0–1	St Mirren	Kilmarnock
19:45 BST		Report	Taylor 4'	Stadium: Rugby Park; Attendance: 5,024; Referee: David Dickinson

5 September 2026 5	St Mirren	1–2	Celtic	Paisley
20:00 BST	Agrafiotis 22' (pen.)	Report	Scales 51'; Yang 68'	Stadium: St Mirren Park; Attendance: 6,911; Referee: Ryan Lee

9 September 2026 6	Rangers	1–0	St Mirren	Glasgow
19:45 BST	Miovski 90+1'	Report		Stadium: Ibrox Stadium; Attendance: 50,336; Referee: Don Robertson

19 September 2026 7	St Mirren	0–3	Dundee United	Paisley
15:00 BST		Report	Randall 6'; Cameron 12'; Ciubotaru 45'	Stadium: St Mirren Park; Attendance: 6,975; Referee: David Dickinson

10 October 2026 8	Heart of Midlothian	5–0	St Mirren	Edinburgh
15:00 BST	Mendy 20'; Miller 32' (pen.), 50' (pen.); Braga 54'; McPake 80'	Report		Stadium: Tynecastle Park; Attendance: 18,582; Referee: Nick Walsh

17 October 2026 9	Aberdeen	3–1	St Mirren	Aberdeen
15:00 BST	Lyons 2'; Nisbet 58'; Mouloua 72'	Report	Sule 42'	Stadium: Pittodrie Stadium; Attendance: 17,020; Referee: John Beaton

24 October 2026 10	St Mirren	2–1	Dundee	Paisley
15:00 BST	Ramsay 20'; Sule 56'	Report	Fink 74'	Stadium: St Mirren Park; Attendance: 6,532; Referee: Steven McLean

28 October 2026 11	St Mirren	1–1	Hibernian	Paisley
19:45 BST	Kerr 83' (o.g.)	Report	Ivezić 78'	Stadium: St Mirren Park; Attendance: 6,573; Referee: Ross Hardie

31 October 2026 12	Motherwell	1–0	St Mirren	Motherwell
15:00 BST	Fadinger 82' (pen.)			Stadium: Fir Park; Attendance: 6,738; Referee: Don Robertson

7 November 2026 13	St Mirren	0–2	Rangers	Paisley
20:00 BST		Report	Naderi 18' (pen.); Neil 61'	Stadium: St Mirren Park; Attendance: 6,795; Referee: Nick Walsh

21 November 2026 14	Celtic	4–1	St Mirren	Glasgow
15:00 BST	Oxlade-Chamberlain 33'; Durán 40'; McCowan 42'; McGregor 63'	Report	Phillips 70' (pen.)	Stadium: Celtic Park; Referee: Matthew MacDermid

28 November 2026 15	St Mirren	v	Kilmarnock	Paisley
15:00 BST				Stadium: St Mirren Park

=== Scottish League Cup ===
==== Group stage ====
11 July 2026 Group stage	Dumbarton	0–4	St Mirren	Coatbridge
15:00 BST		Report	Ramos 7', 73'; Mochrie 39'; Falconer 77'	Stadium: Cliftonhill; Attendance: 591; Referee: Lloyd Wilson

18 July 2026 Group stage	Cove Rangers	0–4	St Mirren	Aberdeen
15:00 BST		Report	Idowu 31' (pen.); Ramos 42'; Douglas 81'; Calvin 85'	Stadium: Balmoral Stadium; Attendance: 722; Referee: Greg Soutar

21 July 2026 Group stage	St Mirren	4–3	East Kilbride	Paisley
19:45 BST	Sule 60' (pen.); Carr 69'; Phillips 77'; Dijksteel 90+3'	Report	Elliott 32' (pen.), 39'; McGuffie 57' (pen.)	Stadium: The Marbill Coaches Stadium; Attendance: 2,614; Referee: Ross Hardie

26 July 2026 Group stage	St Mirren	0–1	Dunfermline Athletic	Paisley
15:00 BST		Report	Kane 88' (pen.)	Stadium: The Marbill Coaches Stadium; Attendance: 3,466; Referee: Sean Murdoch

==== Knockout phase ====
16 August 2026 Second round	Rangers	5–1	St Mirren	Glasgow
16:00 BST	Naderi 9'; Dragojević 18'; Gassama 52'; Penrice 54'; McCausland 74'	Report	Mochrie 30'	Stadium: Ibrox Stadium; Attendance: 34,387; Referee: John Beaton

== Player statistics ==
=== Appearances and goals ===
As of 21 November 2026

No.	Pos	Player	Premiership		League Cup		Scottish Cup		Total	
No.	Pos	Player	Apps	Goals	Apps	Goals	Apps	Goals	Apps	Goals
1	GK	(Australia) Jacob Chapman	14+0	0	5+0	0	0+0	0	19	0
2	DF	(England) Jayden Richardson	2+3	0	2+2	0	0+0	0	9	0
3	DF	(Wales) Declan John	12+0	1	3+0	0	0+0	0	15	1
4	MF	(Northern Ireland) Liam Donnelly	0+5	0	0+0	0	0+0	0	5	0
5	DF	(Jamaica) Richard King	0+0	0	3+0	0	0+0	0	3	0
6	DF	(Scotland) Louis Jackson	3+0	0	0+0	0	0+0	0	3	0
7	MF	(Republic of Ireland) Roland Idowu	0+2	0	3+1	1	0+0	0	6	1
8	MF	(Scotland) Ryan Carr	13+0	0	2+2	1	0+0	0	17	1
9	FW	(Scotland) Eseosa Sule	8+6	2	2+1	1	0+0	0	17	3
10	FW	(Spain) Samuel Ramos	4+4	1	5+0	3	0+0	0	13	4
11	FW	(Kenya) Jonah Ayunga	0+0	0	0+0	0	0+0	0	0	0
13	MF	(Cyprus) Alex Gogić	14+0	0	5+0	0	0+0	0	19	0
16	MF	(Scotland) Luke Thomas	5+9	0	0+1	0	0+0	0	15	0
17	MF	(Australia) Keanu Baccus	0+0	0	0+0	0	0+0	0	0	0
18	MF	(Netherlands) Malik Dijksteel	0+0	0	0+2	1	0+0	0	2	1
19	FW	(Netherlands) Ismeal Kabia	10+0	0	1+0	0	0+0	0	11	0
20	FW	(England) Jake Young	1+12	0	0+1	0	0+0	0	14	0
22	DF	(Scotland) Marcus Fraser	7+1	0	5+0	0	0+0	0	13	0
23	MF	(Scotland) Chris Mochrie	8+3	0	5+0	2	0+0	0	16	2
24	FW	(Scotland) Josh Farquhar	0+1	0	0+0	0	0+0	0	1	0
25	FW	(Serbia) Nikolas Agrafiotis	4+0	1	0+0	0	0+0	0	4	1
26	DF	(Scotland) Marcello De Barros	0+1	0	0+1	0	0+0	0	2	0
27	GK	(Slovakia) Peter Urminský	0+0	0	0+0	0	0+0	0	0	0
30	MF	(Scotland) Fraser Taylor	7+4	1	1+3	0	0+0	0	15	1
31	GK	(Scotland) Ryan Mullen	0+0	0	0+0	0	0+0	0	0	0
32	FW	(Scotland) Luke Douglas	0+2	0	0+4	1	0+0	0	6	1
37	MF	(Scotland) Carrick McEvoy	0+0	0	3+1	0	0+0	0	4	0
40	FW	(Scotland) Caiden McMillan	0+0	0	0+0	0	0+0	0	0	0
47	DF	(Scotland) Calvin Ramsay	12+0	1	0+0	0	0+0	0	12	1
48	MF	(England) Paul Nsio	10+1	1	0+0	0	0+0	0	11	1
53	DF	(England) Henry Fieldson	10+0	0	2+2	0	0+0	0	14	0
88	MF	(Republic of Ireland) Killian Phillips	10+0	4	5+0	1	0+0	0	15	5
Players who left the club during the 2026–27 season
28	DF	(Scotland) Callum Penman	0+0	0	0+0	0	0+0	0	0	0
35	GK	(Scotland) Grant Tamosevicius	0+0	0	0+0	0	0+0	0	0	0
36	DF	(Scotland) Billy Hutchison	0+0	0	0+0	0	0+0	0	0	0
38	DF	(Scotland) Thomas Falconer	0+0	0	0+2	1	0+0	0	2	1
77	FW	(Jamaica) Jalmaro Calvin	0+0	0	3+0	1	0+0	0	3	1

=== Goal scorers ===
As of match played 21 November 2026

Number	Position	Nation	Name	Total	Scottish Premiership	League Cup	Scottish Cup
3	DF	(Wales)	Declan John	1	1		
7	MF	(Republic of Ireland)	Roland Idowu	1		1	
8	MF	(Scotland)	Ryan Carr	1		1	
9	FW	(Scotland)	Eseosa Sule	3	2	1	
10	FW	(Spain)	Samuel Ramos	4	1	3	
18	MF	(Netherlands)	Malik Dijksteel	1		1	
23	MF	(Scotland)	Chris Mochrie	2		2	
25	FW	(Serbia)	Nikolas Agrafiotis	1	1		
30	MF	(Scotland)	Fraser Taylor	1	1		
32	DF	(Scotland)	Luke Douglas	1		1	
38	DF	(Scotland)	Thomas Falconer	1		1	
47	DF	(Scotland)	Calvin Ramsay	1	1		
48	MF	(England)	Paul Nsio	1	1		
77	FW	(Jamaica)	Jalmaro Calvin	1		1	
88	MF	(Republic of Ireland)	Killian Phillips	5	4	1	
Total				25	12	13	0

=== Disciplinary record ===
Includes all competitive matches.

Last updated 21 November 2026

Number	Nation	Position	Name	Total		Scottish Premiership		League Cup		Scottish Cup	
Number	Nation	Position	Name	Yellow card	Red card	Yellow card	Red card	Yellow card	Red card	Yellow card	Red card
4	(Northern Ireland)	MF	Liam Donnelly	1	0	1					
5	(Jamaica)	DF	Richard King	1	0			1			
8	(Scotland)	MF	Ryan Carr	6	0	6					
9	(Scotland)	FW	Eseosa Sule	1	0	1					
10	(Spain)	FW	Samuel Ramos	1	0			1			
13	(Cyprus)	MF	Alex Gogić	5	0	5					
16	(Scotland)	MF	Luke Thomas	2	0	2					
19	(Netherlands)	MF	Ismeal Kabia	1	0	1					
20	(England)	FW	Jake Young	2	0	2					
22	(Scotland)	DF	Marcus Fraser	4	0	2		2			
23	(Scotland)	MF	Chris Mochrie	2	0	2					
25	(Serbia)	FW	Nikolas Agrafiotis	1	0	1					
30	(Scotland)	MF	Fraser Taylor	3	0	2		1			
47	(Scotland)	DF	Calvin Ramsay	3	0	3					
48	(England)	MF	Paul Nsio	3	0	3					
53	(England)	DF	Henry Fieldson	2	0	1		1			
88	(Republic of Ireland)	MF	Killian Phillips	5	0	4		1			

== Team statistics ==
=== League table ===
Pos	Team	Pld	W	D	L	GF	GA	GD	Pts	Qualification or relegation (Note: Teams play each other three times (33 matches), before the league is split into two groups (the top six and the bottom six).)
7	Dundee	13	5	2	6	18	23	−5	17	
8	Aberdeen	13	4	2	7	16	20	−4	14	
9	St Mirren	14	4	2	8	13	26	−13	14	
10	Motherwell	14	3	4	7	16	23	−7	13	
11	Hibernian	13	3	2	8	15	21	−6	11	Qualification for the Premiership play-off final

Updated to match(es) played on 21 November 2026. Source:
Rules for classification: 1) Points; 2) Goal difference; 3) Goals scored; 4) Head-to-head points; 5) Head-to-head goal difference; 6) Play-off (only if deciding champion, UEFA competition qualification, second stage group allocation, or relegation).

=== Division summary ===
Round	1	2	3	4	5	6	7	8	9	10	11	12	13	14
Ground	A	H	H	A	H	A	H	A	A	H	H	A	H	A
Result	W	W	D	W	L	L	L	L	L	W	D	L	L	L
Position	1	1	2	2	2	4	5	6	8	6	7	8	8	9

Updated to match(es) played on 21 November 2026. Source:
A = Away; H = Home; W = Win; D = Draw; L = Loss

=== League Cup table ===
Pos	Team	Pld	W	PW	PL	L	GF	GA	GD	Pts	Qualification	STM	DNF	EKB	DUM	COV
1	St Mirren	4	3	0	0	1	12	4	+8	9	Qualification for the second round	—	0–1	4–3	—	—
2	Dunfermline Athletic	4	3	0	0	1	10	4	+6	9	Qualification for the second round	—	—	—	4–1	5–0
3	East Kilbride	4	2	0	0	2	13	10	+3	6		—	3–0	—	5–3	—
4	Dumbarton	4	1	0	0	3	6	13	−7	3		0–4	—	—	—	2–0
5	Cove Rangers	4	1	0	0	3	3	13	−10	3		0–4	—	3–2	—	—

Rules for classification: 1) goal difference, 2) goals scored, 3) away goals scored, 4) matches won, 5) away matches won, 6) drawing of lots.
