= 1987 Scottish Cup final =

1987 Scottish Cup Final
- Event: 1986–87 Scottish Cup
| St Mirren | Dundee United |
| 1 | 0 |
- (a.e.t.)
- Date: 16 May 1987
- Venue: Hampden Park, Glasgow
- Referee: Kenny Hope
- Attendance: 51,782

The 1987 Scottish Cup Final was played between St Mirren and Dundee United at Hampden Park on 16 May 1987.

Underdogs St Mirren won the game 1–0, with a goal by Ian Ferguson. It was their third Scottish Cup win in their then 110-year history.

This was the last year, as of 2024, that the Scottish Cup has been won by a team fully composed of Scottish players. Moreover, this was the last Scottish Cup final, as of 2024, where all players competing and both managers were Scottish.

== Match ==
=== Summary ===
In his history of Scottish Cup finals, Forrest Robertson described the match as "one of the most disjointed, undistinguished Finals imaginable", while Jim Reynolds, writing in The Glasgow Herald stated it was "a feeble final, the day on which the Scottish Cup almost died of boredom" and a match where "men of many talents could not respond to the occasion". In their history of the Scottish Cup, David Potter and Phil H. Jones claim that "the first ninety minutes of the game was, in the opinion of most people, a dreadful game of football" and note that even the commentators on the television coverage of the match struggled "to keep their audience involved". The main action came in extra time. During this period Iain Ferguson seemed to have opened the scoring for Dundee United, but the goal was disallowed as the referee controversially ruled Kevin Gallacher to be in an offside position. Shortly after this, the similarly named Ian Ferguson scored what proved to be the only goal of the match to win the game for St Mirren, shooting with his left foot into the top left corner of the net from six yards out after running into the penalty area.

=== Details ===
16 May 1987

| St Mirren | 1 – 0 (a.e.t.) | Dundee United |
|---|---|---|
| Ian Ferguson 110' |

Hampden Park, Glasgow
Attendance: 51,782
Referee: Kenny Hope

ST MIRREN:
GK | (Scotland) Campbell Money
DF | (Scotland) Tommy Wilson
DF | (Scotland) Derek Hamilton
DF | (Scotland) Neil Cooper
DF | (Scotland) David Winnie
MF | (Scotland) Ian Ferguson
MF | (Scotland) Paul Lambert | (substituted off) ?'
MF | (Scotland) Billy Abercrombie (c)
MF | (Scotland) Brian Hamilton
FW | (Scotland) Kenny McDowall | (substituted off) ?'
FW | (Scotland) Frank McGarvey
Substitutes:
MF | (Scotland) Tony Fitzpatrick | (substituted on) ?'
MF | (Scotland) Ian Cameron | (substituted on) ?'
Manager:
(Scotland) Alex Smith

DUNDEE UNITED:
GK | (Scotland) Billy Thomson
DF | (Scotland) John Holt
DF | (Scotland) John Clark
DF | (Scotland) David Narey
DF | (Scotland) Maurice Malpas (c)
MF | (Scotland) Eamonn Bannon
MF | (Scotland) David Bowman
MF | (Scotland) Jim McInally
MF | (Scotland) Ian Redford | (substituted off) ?'
FW | (Scotland) Iain Ferguson
FW | (Scotland) Paul Sturrock | (substituted off) ?'
Substitutes:
DF | (Scotland) Paul Hegarty | (substituted on) ?'
FW | (Scotland) Kevin Gallacher | (substituted on) ?'
Manager:
(Scotland) Jim McLean

== Aftermath ==
The night of the match 5000 people congregating in the grounds of Paisley Abbey opposite the town hall to watch the St Mirren's return to their home town. The following day 10,000 supporters watched the team display the cup in an open-decked bus in Paisley. Norman Buchan, the then Member of parliament for Paisley South, welcomed the victory and said it was "extra special when a single community carried off a cup".

Dundee United had to quickly regroup as the Scottish Cup Final had come in the middle of the two-legged UEFA Cup Final that they were contesting with IFK Gothenburg. 1–0 down from the first leg, United were due to play the second leg of the tie in Dundee just 5 days after their Hampden defeat. Ultimately that match finished 1–1, giving the Swedish side a 2–1 aggregate win and meaning that United had lost two cups in less than a week. Both Maurice Malpas and Jim McLean would later indicate that they felt that the disappointment of the defeat at Hampden contributed to United's failure to win the UEFA Cup.
