= Ryan Carr =

Ryan Carr may refer to:

- Ryan Carr (rugby league)
- Ryan Carr (footballer)
