= Tony Fitzpatrick (footballer) =

Scottish footballer and manager

Personal information
- Full name: Anthony Charles Fitzpatrick
- Date of birth: 3 March 1956 (age 70)
- Place of birth: Glasgow, Scotland
- Position: Midfielder

Youth career
- Possil Y.M.

Senior career*
| Years | Team | Apps | (Gls) |
| 1973–1979 | St Mirren | 160 | (9) |
| 1979–1981 | Bristol City | 75 | (1) |
| 1981–1989 | St Mirren | 191 | (9) |
| Total | | 426 | (19) |

International career
| 1977 | Scotland U21 | 5 | (0) |
| 1978 | Scottish League XI | 1 | (0) |

Managerial career
- 1988–1991: St Mirren
- 1996–1998: St Mirren
- 2001: Clydebank (caretaker)
- * Club domestic league appearances and goals

Anthony Charles Fitzpatrick (born 3 March 1956) is a Scottish former football player and manager. He made a record 351 league appearances (458 in all competitions – since beaten by Hugh Murray) for St Mirren in two spells, playing for Bristol City in the two intervening seasons.

== Career ==
Fitzpatrick was made captain of St Mirren at the age of 19 by the then manager Alex Ferguson. He represented the Scottish League XI once, in a 1–1 draw with the Italian League in April 1978.

During his time with the Paisley club he captained them to the 1987 Scottish Cup Final and made a substitute appearance as the team defeated Dundee United to lift the trophy. He also managed the club between 1988 and 1991 and again between 1996 and 1998.

Tony had a spell as Youth Development Manager at Livingston prior to the club entering administration. Following this he decided to change his focus and concentrate on an interest of his, developing peoples self-esteem and confidence through sport and groupwork. He ran Kan-Do Sports Training and Development, working with both adults and teenagers seeking to return to employment by developing their 'soft skills'.

Fitzpatrick was appointed St Mirren chief executive in January 2016, succeeding Brian Caldwell.

In March 2022 at age 66 he announced that he would be stepping down from this role at the end of that month, and transition into an unofficial club ambassador role.

== Legacy ==
Fitzpatrick was one of four former players voted by supporters to have a street named in his honour - Fitzpatrick Way - following a public competition run by Renfrewshire Council to name the streets at the former Love Street ground being developed into affordable housing by Sanctuary Scotland.

He was also honoured by Renfrewshire Council after having a gritter named after him, with 'Tony Gritzpatrick' coming out on top after a public vote to name the local authority's nine gritting machines.
