= Calvin Ramsay =

Scottish footballer (born 2003)

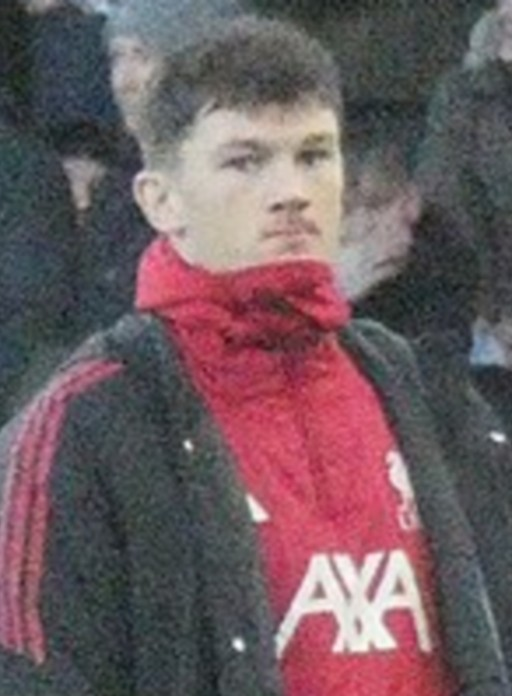
- Ramsey with Liverpool in 2026

Personal information
- Full name: Calvin William Ramsay
- Date of birth: 31 July 2003 (age 23)
- Place of birth: Aberdeen, Scotland
- Height: 5 ft 10 in (1.77 m)
- Position: Right-back

Team information
- Current team: St Mirren (on loan from Liverpool)
- Number: 47

Youth career
- 2012–2021: Aberdeen

Senior career*
Years	Team	Apps	(Gls)
2021–2022	Aberdeen	28	(1)
2022–	Liverpool	0	(0)
2023	→ Preston North End (loan)	2	(0)
2024	→ Bolton Wanderers (loan)	3	(0)
2024–2025	→ Wigan Athletic (loan)	8	(0)
2025	→ Kilmarnock (loan)	8	(0)
2026–	→ St Mirren (loan)	11	(1)

International career
2018–2019	Scotland U16	8	(0)
2019	Scotland U17	3	(0)
2021–2024	Scotland U21	6	(0)
2022	Scotland	1	(0)
- * Club domestic league appearances and goals as of 21:27, 28 October 2026 (UTC)

Calvin William Ramsay (born 31 July 2003) is a Scottish professional footballer who plays as a right-back for Scottish Premiership club St Mirren, on loan from Premier League club Liverpool.

== Club career ==
=== Aberdeen ===
After progressing through the youth ranks at Aberdeen, Ramsay made his debut as a late substitute against Dundee United in March 2021, under caretaker manager Paul Sheerin. Ramsay went on to make another five appearances in his first season with the senior team. He made his European debut for the club against Swedish side BK Häcken in July 2021 in a UEFA Conference League qualifier. He started at right back in a 5–1 win and assisting the first goal of the game. Ramsay won the SFWA Young Player of the Year award for 2021–22, his only full season with Aberdeen.

=== Liverpool ===
Ramsay moved to Premier League club Liverpool in June 2022. He signed a five-year contract for an initial fee of £4.2m, a club record sale for Aberdeen at the time.

On 1 November 2022, Ramsay made his debut for Liverpool when he came on as an 87th minute substitute in the 2-0 win against Napoli in the 2022–23 UEFA Champions League. On 9 November 2022, he started his first game for Liverpool in the win against Derby County in the third round of the EFL Cup at Anfield. In February 2023, having made only two appearances for Liverpool's first team, Ramsay was ruled out for the rest of the 2022–23 season following surgery on an unspecified injury.

On 29 October 2025, Ramsay made his first appearance for Liverpool in three years in a 3-0 defeat to Crystal Palace in the EFL Cup.

==== 2023–24: Loans to Preston North End and Bolton Wanderers ====
On 13 June 2023, after having had his appearances limited for Liverpool, Ramsay was sent on loan to EFL Championship club Preston North End for the 2023–24 season. He was recalled by Liverpool on 15 January 2024 after making two appearances during his time with Preston, and two weeks later joined EFL League One side Bolton Wanderers on loan, following in the footsteps of his Liverpool team-mates Conor Bradley and Owen Beck, who had made the move to the Toughsheet Community Stadium in the previous season. He played 69 minutes with Bolton across three appearances.

==== 2024–25: Loans to Wigan Athletic and Kilmarnock ====
On 5 June 2024, Ramsay was again sent on loan, this time to Wigan Athletic for the 2024–25 season. Having only made twelve appearances in all competitions across the first half of the season, he returned to Liverpool on 3 January 2025. Ten days later he was loaned to Scottish Premiership club Kilmarnock. He made eight appearances with Kilmarnock.

==== 2026–27: Loan to St Mirren ====
On 25 August 2026, Ramsay was once again sent on loan, this time to St Mirren for the 2026–27 season. On 24 October 2026, Ramsay scored his first goal, the opener in a 2-1 win against Dundee.

== International career ==
Ramsay was called up to the senior Scotland squad in November 2022. He made his international debut on 16 November in a 2–1 friendly defeat to Turkey.

== Personal life ==
Ramsay's first child, a son, was born in December 2025.

== Career statistics ==
=== Club ===
As of 28 October 2026

Appearances and goals by club, season and competition
Club	Season	League			National cup (Note: Includes Scottish Cup, FA Cup)		League cup (Note: Includes Scottish League Cup, EFL Cup)		Europe		Other		Total	
Club	Season	Division	Apps	Goals	Apps	Goals	Apps	Goals	Apps	Goals	Apps	Goals	Apps	Goals
Aberdeen U21	2019–20	—			—		—		—		1 (Note: Appearance in Scottish Challenge Cup)	0	1	0
Aberdeen	2020–21	Scottish Premiership	4	0	2	0	0	0	0	0	—		6	0
Aberdeen	2021–22	Scottish Premiership	24	1	2	0	1	0	6 (Note: Appearances in UEFA Europa Conference League)	0	—		33	1
Aberdeen	Total		28	1	4	0	1	0	6	0	1	0	39	1
Liverpool	2022–23	Premier League	0	0	0	0	1	0	1 (Note: Appearance in UEFA Champions League)	0	0	0	2	0
Liverpool	2025–26	Premier League	0	0	1	0	1	0	0	0	0	0	2	0
Liverpool	Total		0	0	1	0	2	0	1	0	0	0	4	0
Preston North End (loan)	2023–24	EFL Championship	2	0	0	0	0	0	—		—		2	0
Bolton Wanderers (loan)	2023–24	EFL League One	3	0	—		—		—		1 (Note: Appearance(s) in EFL Trophy)	0	4	0
Wigan Athletic (loan)	2024–25	EFL League One	8	0	1	0	1	0	—		2	0	12	0
Kilmarnock (loan)	2024–25	Scottish Premiership	8	0	0	0	—		—		—		8	0
St Mirren (loan)	2026–27	Scottish Premiership	9	1	0	0	—		—		—		9	1
Career total			58	2	6	0	4	0	7	0	4	0	79	2

=== International ===
As of match played 16 November 2022

Appearances and goals by national team and year
National team	Year	Apps	Goals
Scotland	2022	1	0
Total		1	0

== Honours ==
Individual

- SFWA Young Player of the Year: 2021–22
