= Hugh Murray (footballer) =

Scottish footballer

Personal information
- Full name: Hugh Murray
- Date of birth: 8 January 1979 (age 47)
- Place of birth: Bellshill, Scotland
- Position: Midfielder

Youth career
- St Mirren

Senior career*
Years	Team	Apps	(Gls)
1996–2012	St Mirren	424	(15)
2012–2014	Partick Thistle	12	(0)
2013	→ Dumbarton (loan)	10	(0)
2014	Dumbarton	5	(0)
2015–2016	Clyde	22	(0)

International career
1999–2004	Scotland U21	7	(0)
- * Club domestic league appearances and goals as of 02:35, 10 January 2016 (UTC)

Hugh 'Shug' Murray (born 8 January 1979) is a Scottish retired professional footballer. He came through the youth ranks at St Mirren, where he celebrated his testimonial year in 2007 and eventually broke the club record for appearances. He also had short spells at Partick Thistle, Dumbarton and Clyde.

== Club career ==
=== St Mirren ===
Born in Bellshill, Murray broke into the St Mirren side under Tony Fitzpatrick towards the end of the 1996–97 season. The following season, he soon became an established member of the side. At the end of that season, St Mirren were flirting with relegation to Scottish Second Division (which would have been a financial disaster for the club). The team travelled to face fellow strugglers Stirling Albion and Murray netted a goal in the top corner to win the match.

In the 1999–2000 season, Murray played a major part in the Scottish First Division championship win. One outstanding occasion was in the 8–0 drubbing of Clydebank, who were soon liquidated. Murray ran towards the edge of the 18-yard box to control the ball with his head. He not only did this, but managed to juggle the ball on his head past the defence, then stroke the ball past the keeper.

After a close season spell away from Love Street in 2001, Murray decided to return to Saints once again for the start of the next season and in the 2005–06 season his decision was vindicated when he became the first ever St Mirren player to gain three winners' medals in national competitions when he added the Scottish Challenge Cup and another First Division title medal to his 1999–2000 medal.

In the 2007–08 season, Murray was made St Mirren's club captain following the departure of Kevin McGowne. He started over 30 games over that season. Murray lost the captain's armband to John Potter for the 2008–09 season, during which Murray played in a defensive midfield role, with performances earning him some acclaim.

Murray was inducted into the St Mirren 'Hall of Fame' in 2006 at the age of just 27 and in season 2007–08 he made his 300th start against Falkirk in a 1–0 win at the Falkirk Stadium. On 24 October 2009, he scored his first two goals in over two years against Motherwell. He holds the record of most appearances for a St Mirren player, at 462 appearances.

=== Later years ===
On Monday 14 May 2012, Murray signed a two-year deal with Partick Thistle. He was sent off three times for Thistle in one season, twice against Greenock Morton (his boyhood rivals) and the suspensions left him out of favour. Injury and suspension limited his contribution on the park in the second half of the season, and he spent the first part of the 2013–14 season on loan with Championship side Dumbarton.

On 6 January 2014, Murray's contract with Partick Thistle was cancelled. He returned to Dumbarton and signed permanently for the club on 9 January. Murray extended his time with the Sons on 4 June, penning a new 1-year deal. He left the club on 30 December 2014, joining Clyde on a free transfer.

== International career ==
Murray was never capped by the Scotland national team but did play seven times at under-21 level.

== Career statistics ==
Correct as of December 2016

Club	Season	League		Cup		League Cup		Challenge Cup		Total	
Club	Season	Apps	Goals	Apps	Goals	Apps	Goals	Apps	Goals	Apps	Goals
St Mirren	1997–98	28	3	1	0	2	0	0	0	31	3
St Mirren	1998–99	29	0	2	0	1	0	0	0	32	0
St Mirren	1999–00	29	5	2	0	1	0	1	0	33	5
St Mirren	2000–01	23	0	1	0	4	1	0	0	28	1
St Mirren	2001–02	32	0	1	0	1	0	1	0	35	0
St Mirren	2002–03	16	0	1	0	2	0	1	0	19	0
St Mirren	2003–04	30	2	2	0	0	0	0	0	32	2
St Mirren	2004–05	31	1	3	1	1	0	0	0	35	2
St Mirren	2005–06	29	1	3	0	2	0	5	0	39	1
St Mirren	2006–07	31	1	0	0	2	0	0	0	33	1
St Mirren	2007–08	29	0	3	0	1	0	0	0	33	0
St Mirren	2008–09	30	0	5	0	2	0	0	0	37	0
St Mirren	2009–10	33	2	3	0	4	0	0	0	40	2
St Mirren	2010–11	22	0	3	0	1	0	0	0	26	0
St Mirren	2011–12	4	0	0	0	0	0	0	0	4	0
Total		399	15	30	1	24	1	8	0	462	17
Partick Thistle	2012–13	12	0	1	0	1	0	2	0	16	0
Partick Thistle	2013–14	0	0	0	0	0	0	0	0	0	0
Dumbarton	2013–14	14	0	0	0	1	0	0	0	15	0
Dumbarton	2014–15	1	0	0	0	0	0	1	0	2	0
Clyde	2014–15	18	0	0	0	0	0	0	0	18	0
Clyde	2015–16	4	0	0	0	1	0	1	0	6	0
Career total		448	15	31	1	27	1	12	0	519	17

== Honours ==
St Mirren

- Scottish First Division: 1999–00, 2005–06
- Scottish Challenge Cup: 2005

Partick Thistle

- Scottish First Division: 2012–13
