= Fraser Taylor =

Scottish footballer (born 2003)

Personal information
- Date of birth: 20 February 2003 (age 23)
- Place of birth: Johnstone, Renfrewshire, Scotland
- Height: 1.75 m (5 ft 9 in)
- Position: Midfielder

Team information
- Current team: St Mirren
- Number: 30

Youth career
- St Mirren

Senior career*
Years	Team	Apps	(Gls)
2021–	St Mirren	19	(1)
2021–2022	→ Cumbernauld Colts (loan)		
2023–2024	→ Ballymena United (loan)	36	(4)
2024–2025	→ Arbroath (loan)	28	(7)
2026	→ Partick Thistle (loan)	7	(0)
- * Club domestic league appearances and goals as of 11:15, 21 October 2026 (UTC)

Fraser Taylor (born 20 February 2003) is a Scottish professional footballer who plays as a midfielder for Scottish Premiership club St Mirren.

== Career ==
=== Early years and loans ===
Fraser signed a professional contract with St Mirren after coming through the club's youth academy. In July 2022, Taylor made his St Mirren debut coming off the bench in a 3–1 victory over Edinburgh City in the Scottish League Cup group stages.

In August 2023, Taylor signed a two-year contract extension until summer 2025.

==== Ballymena United (loan) ====
In August 2023 Taylor joined NIFL Premiership side Ballymena United on a season long loan.

Taylor won Ballymena's Player of the Year award, after helping the club avoid relegation.

==== Arbroath (loan) ====
Taylor joined Scottish League One side Arbroath on a season long loan in September 2024. Taylor scored his first goal for Arbroath, scoring the winner in a 1–0 home victory over Stenhousemuir.

Following winning the Scottish League One title with Arbroath, Fraser won the PFA Scottish League One Player of the Year for the 2024–2025 season.

After returning from his loan spell with Arbroath, Taylor signed a one-year contract extension with St Mirren in May 2025.

==== Partick Thistle (loan) ====
On 29 January 2026, Taylor joined Scottish Championship club Partick Thistle on loan until the end of the season. Taylor made his Thistle debut the following day, coming off the bench in a 2–2 draw with St Johnstone.

=== St Mirren breakthrough ===
Upon returning from his Partick Thistle loan, Taylor signed a two-year contract extension with St. Mirren, committing himself to the club until 2028. Beginning to make regular appearances for his boyhood club in the 2026–27 season, he scored his debut goal for the club ina 1–0 victory over Kilmarnock on 3 September 2026.

== Personal life ==
Taylor grew up supporting St Mirren, the club he would begin his professional career with.

== Honours ==
Club

Arbroath

- Scottish League One: 2024–25

Individual

- PFA Scottish League One Player of the Year: 2024–25
