= Malik Dijksteel =

Dutch footballer (born 2001)

Personal information
- Full name: Malik Marcel Dijksteel
- Date of birth: 8 July 2001 (age 25)
- Place of birth: Amsterdam, Netherlands
- Height: 1.76 m (5 ft 9 in)
- Positions: Winger; attacking midfielder

Team information
- Current team: St Mirren
- Number: 18

Youth career
- 2006–2009: AVV Zeeburgia
- 2009–2018: Feyenoord
- 2020–2021: Telstar
- 2021: Middlesbrough

Senior career*
Years	Team	Apps	(Gls)
2021–2022	Middlesbrough	0	(0)
2021–2022	→ Whitby Town (loan)	5	(0)
2022–2023	Whitby Town	19	(1)
2023	Wrexham	0	(0)
2023–2025	Cork City	35	(3)
2025–	St Mirren	7	(0)
- * Club domestic league appearances and goals as of 13:57, 13 July 2026 (UTC)

Malik Marcel Dijksteel (born 8 July 2001) is a Dutch professional footballer who plays as a winger or attacking midfielder for Scottish Premiership club St Mirren.

== Career ==
=== Youth career ===
Born and raised in Amsterdam and of Surinamese descent, Dijksteel began playing football with local club AVV Zeeburgia before signing for the academy of Feyenoord, where he remained until 2018, before joining the academy of Telstar in 2020. While at Feyenoord, he played in the same team as Jurrien Timber, Quinten Timber, Crysencio Summerville and Joshua Zirkzee.

=== Middlesbrough ===
On 2 February 2021, he signed for EFL Championship club Middlesbrough, where his older brother Anfernee Dijksteel was also playing. He played with the club's reserve side, with his only involvement in the first team coming on 11 August 2021, when he was an unused substitute alongside his brother, in a 3–0 loss away to Blackpool in the EFL Cup at Bloomfield Road.

=== Whitby Town ===
He signed for Northern Premier League side Whitby Town on loan in December 2021, making his debut in a 4–2 win over Mickleover Sports. After impressing in his short spell, his loan was extended for another month in January 2022. He made 5 appearances during his loan spell. On 13 September 2022, he signed a permanent contract with the club. He made 19 appearances, scoring 1 goal before departing the club.

=== Wrexham ===
On 24 March 2023, he joined National League side Wrexham until the end of the season. He only featured for the club's reserve side during his short spell with the club, failing to make a first team appearance before being released in May 2023.

=== Cork City ===
On 16 August 2023, he signed for League of Ireland Premier Division club Cork City, to help them in their relegation battle. On 15 September 2023, he scored his first goal for the club in a 2–0 win at home to Wexford in the FAI Cup. He made 11 appearances in all competitions for the club by the end of the season as they were relegated to the League of Ireland First Division after losing the Playoff to Waterford, with Dijksteel still committing his future to the club by signing a new contract in December 2023. On 20 July 2024, he scored the only goal of the game in a 1–0 win over Finn Harps in the FAI Cup at Turners Cross. Dijksteel scored the only goal of the game on 6 September 2024 as his side defeated UCD away to secure the 2024 League of Ireland First Division title and promotion back to the Premier Division. On 28 October 2024, he signed a new contract with the club. On 14 February 2025, he scored the opening goal of the game in a 2–2 draw at home to Galway United in the opening game of the 2025 League of Ireland Premier Division season. On 22 July 2025, it was announced that Dijksteel had agreed a deal to sign for Scottish Premiership club St Mirren on 1 January 2026, after his contract at Cork City expires. 3 days later Cork City manager Ger Nash confirmed that Dijksteel had made himself unavailable for selection for the club's game against Sligo Rovers after they had rejected a bid from St Mirren for Dijksteel before his pre-contract agreement was confirmed, stating "St Mirren made a bid to take him in this window but that was rejected by the club. Unfortunately, since then Malik's agent made it clear that he was unavailable for this match for personal reasons." After departing the club, Dijksteel hit back at the club stating "Things have been said about me that are completely false" which then led to Cork City manager Ger Nash admitting that it had been a club decision to not select Dijksteel for the game.

=== St Mirren ===
On 31 July 2025, Dijksteel's move to St Mirren was confirmed prior to the January 2026 pre-contract agreement, on a 3-year contract for an undisclosed fee. He made his debut for the club on 3 August 2025, coming off the bench as a late substitute in a 1–0 defeat away to champions Celtic in the opening league game of the season.

== Personal life ==
He is the younger brother of fellow professional footballer Anfernee Dijksteel who plays in Turkey for Kocaelispor and the Suriname national team.

== Career statistics ==
As of match played on 26 July 2026

Appearances and goals by club, season and competition
Club	Season	League			National Cup (Note: Includes FA Cup, FAI Cup & Scottish Cup)		League Cup (Note: Includes EFL Cup & Scottish League Cup)		Other		Total	
Club	Season	Division	Apps	Goals	Apps	Goals	Apps	Goals	Apps	Goals	Apps	Goals
Middlesbrough	2022–23	EFL Championship	0	0	0	0	0	0	—		0	0
Whitby Town (loan)	2021–22	Northern Premier League	5	0	—		—		0	0	5	0
Whitby Town	2022–23	Northern Premier League	19	1	0	0	—		0	0	19	1
Wrexham	2022–23	National League	0	0	—		—		—		0	0
Cork City	2023	LOI Premier Division	8	0	3	1	—		0	0	11	1
Cork City	2024	LOI First Division	17	2	2	1	—		0	0	19	3
Cork City	2025	LOI Premier Division	10	1	1	0	—		0	0	11	1
Cork City	Total		35	3	6	2	—		0	0	41	5
St Mirren	2025–26	Scottish Premiership	7	0	2	0	2	0	–		11	0
St Mirren	2026–27	Scottish Premiership	0	0	0	0	2	0	–		2	0
St Mirren	Total		7	0	2	0	4	0	—		13	0
Career Total			66	4	8	2	4	0	0	0	78	6

== Honours ==
Cork City

- League of Ireland First Division: 2024

St Mirren

- Scottish League Cup: 2025–26
