= Eseosa Sule =

Scottish footballer (born 2006)

Personal information
- Full name: Eseosa Joshua Sule
- Date of birth: 1 April 2006 (age 20)
- Place of birth: Glasgow, Scotland
- Height: 6 ft 2 in (1.89 m)
- Position: Forward

Team information
- Current team: St Mirren
- Number: 9

Youth career
- 2012–2023: Celtic
- 2023–2024: West Bromwich Albion

Senior career*
Years	Team	Apps	(Gls)
2024–2026	West Bromwich Albion	1	(0)
2025–2026	→ Motherwell (loan)	0	(0)
2026–	St Mirren	10	(2)
- * Club domestic league appearances and goals as of 24 October 2026

Eseosa Joshua Sule (born 1 April 2006) is a Scottish professional footballer who plays as a forward for Scottish Premiership side St Mirren.

== Club career ==
=== West Bromwich Albion ===
Sule started his career with Celtic before joining English side West Bromwich Albion in January 2023. On 13 May 2023, he signed his first professional contract with the club. On 13 August 2024, he made his professional debut for West Bromwich Albion in a 2–1 defeat to Fleetwood Town in the EFL Cup. On 3 July 2025, he signed a new two-year contract with the club.

On 7 July 2025, Sule joined Scottish Premiership side Motherwell on a season-long loan. He made his debut for the club on 12 July 2025, in a 2–2 draw with Clyde in the Scottish League Cup. In August 2025, he returned to his parent club to recover from an injury sustained on loan, with the expectation of rejoining Motherwell once fit. On 1 January 2026, he returned to West Bromwich Albion after his loan to Motherwell was ended early due to the thigh injury he sustained in August.

Sule made his league debut for West Bromwich Albion on 10 April 2026, featuring in a 0–0 draw with Millwall in the Championship.

=== St Mirren ===
On 14 July 2026, Sule signed with Scottish Premiership club St Mirren on a three-year contract for an undisclosed fee. He scored on his debut for the club on 21 July 2026, netting in a 4–3 win against East Kilbride in the Scottish League Cup. He made his league debut on 1 August 2026, in a 2–0 win against Falkirk. He scored his first league goal on 17 October 2026, in a 3–1 defeat to Aberdeen.

== International career ==
In November 2026, Sule received his first call-up to the Scotland U21 side.

== Career statistics ==
As of match played 24 October 2026

Appearances and goals by club, season and competition
Club	Season	League			National Cup (Note: Includes FA Cup, Scottish Cup)		League Cup (Note: Includes EFL Cup, Scottish League Cup)		Other		Total	
Club	Season	Division	Apps	Goals	Apps	Goals	Apps	Goals	Apps	Goals	Apps	Goals
West Bromwich Albion	2024–25	Championship	0	0	0	0	1	0	—		1	0
West Bromwich Albion	2025–26	Championship	1	0	0	0	0	0	—		1	0
West Bromwich Albion	Total		1	0	0	0	1	0	0	0	2	0
Motherwell (loan)	2025–26	Scottish Premiership	0	0	0	0	3	0	—		3	0
St Mirren	2026–27	Scottish Premiership	10	2	0	0	3	1	—		13	3
Career total			11	2	0	0	7	1	0	0	18	3
