= Robel Teklemichael =

Eritrean footballer (born 2000)

Personal information
- Full name: Robel Teklemichael Bahta
- Date of birth: 14 July 2000 (age 26)
- Place of birth: Asmara, Eritrea
- Height: 1.80 m (5 ft 11 in)
- Position: Defender

Team information
- Current team: Peterhead
- Number: 34

Senior career*
Years	Team	Apps	(Gls)
2019–2021	Red Sea		
2021–2024	Ethiopian Coffee	48	(8)
2026–	Peterhead	3	(0)

International career^{‡}
2021	Eritrea U23	1	(0)
2019–	Eritrea	9	(0)
- * Club domestic league appearances and goals as of 03:02, 27 August 2026 (UTC) ‡ National team caps and goals as of 15:32, 10 July 2026 (UTC)

Robel Teklemichael Bahta (Tigrinya: ሮቤል ተኽለሚካኤል ባህታ) is an Eritrean professional footballer who plays as a defender for Scottish League One club Peterhead and the Eritrea national team.

== Club career ==
=== Ethiopian Coffee ===
In April 2021, Teklemichael joined Ethiopian Coffee of the Ethiopian Premier League. By signing the deal, Teklemichael became the second Eritrean player to join an Ethiopian club (after Samyoma Alexander) following the 2018 Eritrea–Ethiopia summit. Teklemichael suffered a knee injury which kept him sidelined for a significant period of time before leaving the club in 2024.

=== Peterhead ===
Teklemichael spent the 2025/2026 season training and rehabilitating with a lower-league club in Sweden. In June 2026, he went on trial with Scottish League One club Peterhead. During the trial, he appeared in friendlies versus Celtic and Forfar Athletic. About the player's performance, Peterhead manager Jordon Brown said, “Robel has come to us out the blue through an agent and he’s equipped himself well...He’s someone we were made aware of and he’s been given every chance to get a deal." On 8 July 2026, it was announced that Teklemichael had signed a one-year contract with the club, subject to SFA approval.

== International career ==
In December 2018 Teklemichael was part of the Eritrea youth team that beat South Sudan 3–0. He was named Man of the Match following the friendly victory. He made his senior international debut on 4 September 2019 in a 2022 FIFA World Cup qualification match against Namibia.

Later that month Teklemichael took part in the 2019 CECAFA U-20 Championship, the first regional tournament in which the team participated in a decade. The team went on to win the bronze medal overall with Teklemichael serving as the team captain. He scored two goals in the group stage of the tournament, one against Sudan and the other against Djibouti.

Because of his performance at the Under-20 Championship, Teklemichael was called up for the 2019 CECAFA Cup later that year. He once again captained the Eritrea side that went on to win the silver medal, losing to Uganda in the final. Teklemichael was named the tournament's Most Valuable Player for his performance.

In July 2021 he Teklemichael captained his national side once again, this time at the 2021 CECAFA U-23 Challenge Cup.

== Career statistics ==
=== Club ===
As of 1 August 2023

Appearances and goals by club, season and competition
Club	Season	League			Domestic Cup		Continental		Other		Total	
Club	Season	Division	Apps	Goals	Apps	Goals	Apps	Goals	Apps	Goals	Apps	Goals
Ethiopian Coffee	2021–22	Ethiopian Premier League	24	2	?	?	0	0	—		24	2
Ethiopian Coffee	2022–23	Ethiopian Premier League	24	6	?	?	—		—		24	6
Ethiopian Coffee	2023–24	Ethiopian Premier League	25	4	?	?	—		—		25	4 (Note: Did not played for the entire season due to a season ending injury)
Career total			73	12	0	0	0	0	0	0	73	12

=== National team ===
As of match played 25 January 2020

Appearances and goals by national team and year
National team	Year	Apps	Goals
Eritrea	2019	8	0
Eritrea	2020	1	0
Total		9	0

== Honours ==
Ethiopian Coffee S.C.

- Ethiopian Cup: 2023-2024
