= Billy Abercromby =

Scottish footballer (1958–2024)

Personal information
- Full name: William Abercromby
- Date of birth: 14 September 1958
- Place of birth: Paisley, Scotland
- Date of death: June 2024 (aged 65)
- Position: Midfielder

Youth career
- 1975–1976: St Mirren

Senior career*
Years	Team	Apps	(Gls)
1976–1988	St Mirren	288	(15)
1988–1989	Partick Thistle	10	(0)
1989–1990	Dunfermline Athletic	9	(0)
1990	Cowdenbeath	4	(0)
1990–1991	East Stirlingshire	5	(0)
Total		316	(15)
- * Club domestic league appearances and goals

William Abercromby (14 September 1958 – June 2024) was a Scottish footballer who played as a midfielder.

Abercromby came through the youth ranks at St Mirren and signed a full professional contract in 1975. A year later he experienced his first involvement with the first team squad when Sir Alex Ferguson called him into the squad to tour the West Indies.

On 29 October 1986, Abercromby was sent off for three red card offences, one for foul play and two counts of dissent during a match against Motherwell at Love Street. As a result, he was banned for twelve matches. He won the 1987 Scottish Cup when St Mirren beat Dundee United 1–0 in the final. During the 1980s, Billy was involved in all four of St Mirren's forays into European competition, playing in nine of the club's 14 matches, more than any other Saints player.

He was transferred to Partick Thistle in 1988.

Abercromby battled with severe alcoholism when his playing days ended with his experiences and subsequent recovery being detailed in his biography Aber's Gonnae Get Ye.

Abercromby was one of the ex-players involved in the after-match parade following St Mirren's last game at the Love Street (stadium) on 3 January 2009.

Abercromby's death was announced on 18 June 2024. He was 65.
