= Cameron O'Donnell =

Scottish footballer

Personal information
- Date of birth: 29 September 2001 (age 25)
- Place of birth: Scotland
- Height: 6 ft 0 in (1.83 m)
- Position: Midfielder

Team information
- Current team: Alloa Athletic
- Number: 20

Youth career
- –2019: Alloa Athletic

Senior career*
Years	Team	Apps	(Gls)
2019–	Alloa Athletic	135	(6)
- * Club domestic league appearances and goals as of 4 May 2026

Cameron O'Donnell (born 29 September 2001) is a Scottish professional footballer who plays as a midfielder for Scottish League One club Alloa Athletic.

== Career statistics ==
As of match played 27 October 2021

Appearances and goals by club, season and competition
Club	Season	League			Cup		League Cup		Other		Total	
Club	Season	Division	Apps	Goals	Apps	Goals	Apps	Goals	Apps	Goals	Apps	Goals
Alloa Athletic	2019–20	Scottish Championship	3	0	1	0	0	0	1 (Note: Appearance(s) in the Scottish Challenge Cup)	0	5	0
Alloa Athletic	2020–21	Scottish Championship	6	0	1	1	3	0	0	0	10	1
Alloa Athletic	2021–22	Scottish League One	6	0	0	0	3	0	1	0	10	0
Alloa Athletic	Total		15	0	2	1	6	0	2	0	25	1
Career total			15	0	2	1	6	0	2	0	25	1
