= Andrew Tod (footballer, born 2006) =

Scottish footballer (born 2006)

Personal information
- Date of birth: 26 February 2006 (age 20)
- Place of birth: Perth, Scotland
- Positions: Midfielder; winger; forward

Team information
- Current team: Dunfermline Athletic
- Number: 26

Youth career
- –2016: Kinross Colts
- 2016–2018: Dunfermline Athletic
- 2018–2021: Hibernian
- 2021–2022: Dunfermline Athletic

Senior career*
Years	Team	Apps	(Gls)
2022–	Dunfermline Athletic	39	(13)
2023	→ Elgin City (loan)	7	(0)
2024	→ East Fife (loan)	5	(1)

International career^{‡}
2025–	Scotland U21	2	(0)
- * Club domestic league appearances and goals as of 4 May 2026 ‡ National team caps and goals as of 18 November 2025

Andrew Tod (born 26 February 2006) is a Scottish professional footballer who plays as a midfielder, winger, or forward for Dunfermline.

== Early life ==
Tod was born on 26 February 2006 in Perth, Scotland. The son of Scottish footballer Andy Tod, he is the older brother of fellow footballer John Tod.

== Career ==
As a youth player, Tod played for local side Kinross Colts. He joined the youth academy of Dunfermline Athletic in 2016 before signing for Hibernian in 2018. Ahead of the 2021–22 season, he returned to Dunfermline and was promoted to the club's senior squad in 2022.

In February 2023 he was sent on loan to Elgin City, where he made seven league appearances without scoring. Subsequently, in September 2024 he was loaned to East Fife, where he made five league appearances and scored one goal before a knee injury two months later forced his return to Dunfermline ahead of schedule.

== Style of play ==
Tod plays as a midfielder, winger, or forward. Right-footed, he is known for his versatility.

== International career ==
Tod is a Scotland youth international. During the autumn of 2025, he played for the Scotland national under-21 football team for 2027 UEFA European Under-21 Championship qualification.
