= St Mirren F.C. =

Association football club in Scotland

St Mirren
- Full name: St Mirren Football Club
- Nicknames: The Buddies; The Saints
- Founded: 1877; 149 years ago
- Ground: St Mirren Park, Paisley
- Capacity: 8,000
- Coordinates: 55°51′2″N 4°26′39″W
- Chairman: John Needham
- Manager: Craig McLeish
- League: Scottish Premiership
- 2025–26: Scottish Premiership, 11th of 12
- Website: stmirren.com
Home colours

St Mirren Football Club is a Scottish professional football club based in Paisley, Renfrewshire, that competes in the Scottish Premiership after winning the 2017–18 Scottish Championship. Founded in 1877, the team has two nicknames: The Buddies and The Saints.

St Mirren have won the Scottish Cup three times, in 1926, 1959 and 1987, and the Scottish League Cup in 2013 and 2025. They have played in European competition five times: in the UEFA Cup Winners' Cup in 1987–88, the UEFA Cup in 1980–81, 1983–84 and 1985–86 and the UEFA Conference League in 2024–25, which saw the club return to Europe for the first time in 37 years. They are the only Scottish team to win the Anglo-Scottish Cup, beating Bristol City 5–1 over two legs in 1979–80.

The club's home ground since 2009 is St Mirren Park, an all-seater stadium on Greenhill Road, Paisley. It has a capacity of 8,000. The club's former home from 1894 until 2009 was also officially named St Mirren Park, but was more commonly known as Love Street.

== History ==
St Mirren Football Club was originally a gentlemen's club which was formed in the second half of the 19th century and played, among other sports, cricket and rugby. The increasing popularity of football ensured that by 1877 the members had decided to play association football and 1877 is the football club's official foundation date. They are named after Saint Mirin, the founder of a church at the site of Paisley Abbey and Patron Saint of Paisley. There is also a street in Paisley named St Mirren Street. The team's first strip was scarlet and blue but, after one season, the club changed to the current black and white striped shirts, which have been worn every season bar one in the 1900s, when cream tops were used.

Chart of yearly table positions of St Mirren, 1890–2025

St Mirren played their first match on 6 October 1877, defeating Johnstone Britannia 1–0 at Shortroods. Two years later, the club moved to another ground named Thistle Park at Greenhills. St Mirren's first Scottish Cup match was on 4 September 1880, a 3–0 victory over Johnstone Athletic. The following year, St Mirren reached their first cup final but were beaten 3–1 by Thornliebank in the Renfrewshire Cup. In 1883, the scores were reversed with St Mirren winning the Renfrewshire Cup, 3–1 against Thornliebank. It was in 1883 that the club moved to its third home, that of West March (early maps indicate the area as West March rather than the commonly used Westmarch), defeating Queen's Park in the first game there. In 1885, St Mirren played their first match against Morton, resulting in a defeat.

The 1890 season was a historic season for St Mirren, as they became founder members of the Scottish Football League along with fellow Paisley club Abercorn. Of the eleven founder clubs, only five survive in the current league system. It was during the match against Morton at Cappielow in 1890 that St Mirren played one of the first night games under light from oil lamps. The club moved to Love Street in 1894 and the team reached their first Scottish Cup final in the 1907–08 season but were defeated 5–1 by Celtic. St Mirren went on to lift the trophy in 1926, 1959 and 1987. A short-lived Scottish Junior Football Association side under the club's umbrella, St Mirren Juniors F.C., won the Scottish Junior Cup in 1917, making St Mirren the only senior club name (as of 2025) on the trophy.

Cigarette card published in 1909 depicting Robert Robertson

In 1922, St Mirren were invited to play in the Barcelona Cup invitational tournament to celebrate the inauguration of Les Corts, the then home of Barcelona. They won the tournament by beating Notts County in the final.

In the 1979–80 season, St Mirren achieved their equal highest-ever finish in the top-flight finishing third behind Aberdeen and Celtic. That season Saints also became the first and last Scottish club to win the Anglo-Scottish Cup, defeating Bristol City in a two-legged final. The following season, St Mirren competed in European competition for the first time and won their initial game 2–1 vs. IF Elfsborg in Sweden, followed by a 0–0 draw in the second leg. The next round saw them play French team Saint-Étienne. Although St Mirren's home leg ended up a 0–0 draw, Saint-Étienne pulled off a 2–0 victory in the second leg to put St Mirren out of the cup.

The club have been relegated from the Scottish Premier League twice (2000–01 and 2014–15) and the Premier Division of the Scottish Football League once (1991–92) having escaped relegation from the latter in 1991 after league re-construction. In 2001, St Mirren finished bottom of the Premier League despite losing only one of their final seven matches. The Saints however managed promotion after clinching the First Division title in 2005–06, a season which also saw St Mirren win the Scottish Challenge Cup, defeating Hamilton Academical 2–1 in the final at Airdrie United's ground, the Shyberry Excelsior Stadium, with goals from Simon Lappin and John Sutton.

In 2010, they reached the final of the Scottish League Cup where they were defeated 0–1 by Rangers despite having a two-man advantage. However, three days later, they recorded a famous win over Celtic, a match that The Buddies won 4–0 with doubles from Andy Dorman and Steven Thomson. In March 2013, St Mirren won the Scottish League Cup beating Heart of Midlothian 3–2 at Hampden to win their first cup since 1987.

In the 2010s the club drew praise for their youth development, bringing through several players from their academy (despite it not being listed among the 'elite' group assessed by the SFA in 2017) including Stevie Mallan, Jack Baird, Kyle Magennis, Jason Naismith, Kyle McAllister, Sean Kelly and full Scotland internationals Kenny McLean, Lewis Morgan and John McGinn.

On 14 December 2025, St Mirren won their second League Cup, and their first trophy in 12 years, when they beat Celtic 3–1 in the 2025 Scottish League Cup final.

== Stadium ==
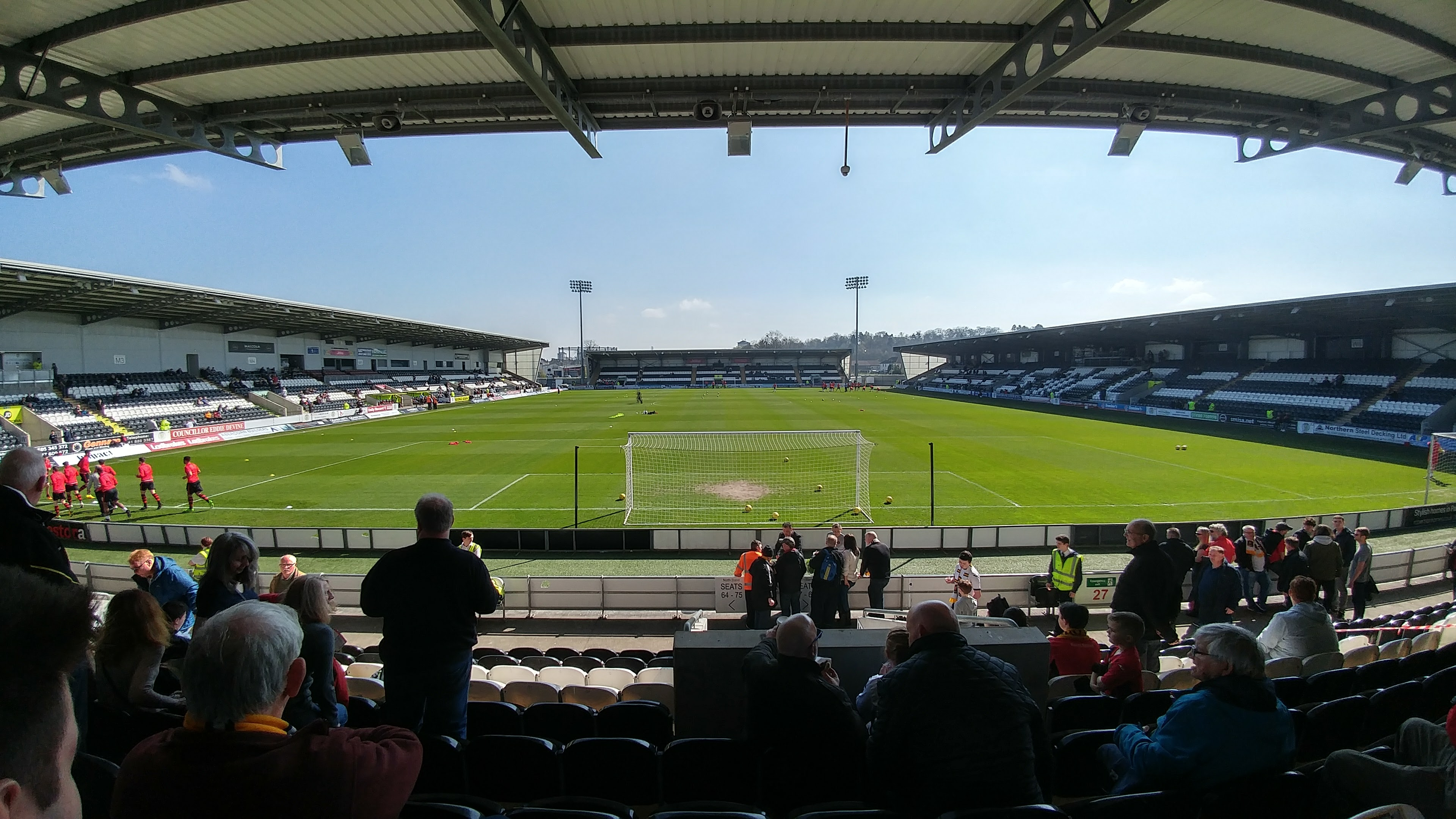
The SMiSA Stadium, St Mirren FC 2017

St Mirren played at four different venues before moving to their ground at St Mirren Park, or Love Street, in 1894. The record attendance for the ground was 47,438 versus Celtic in 1949. Love Street saw extensive redevelopment in the late 90s to comply with both the recommendations of the Taylor Report and SPL regulations and the ground eventually became a 10,866 seater venue. The ground had four stands of which the most recent, the West or Reid Kerr Family Stand, was built in 2000 in order for Love Street to meet the criteria for entry to the Scottish Premier League. The oldest stand was the main stand which had a basic wooden construction. The north bank was popular with the hardcore St Mirren fans while the largest stand, the steeply raked West Stand, housed a sporting facility underneath.

On 24 May 2005, Renfrewshire Council granted permission for the club to develop their old ground. This involved the sale of the ground to a supermarket chain, and the construction of a ground in Ferguslie Park, Paisley (through a separate planning permission). The sale of their old ground allowed the club to finance the new stadium as well as clear their debts. In April 2007 it was announced that a deal had been struck with supermarket giant Tesco and on 15 January 2009 St Mirren moved to a new 7,937-seat stadium, also called St Mirren Park.

The opening game finished as a 1–1 draw with Kilmarnock, with Killie's Kevin Kyle scoring the first goal, and Dennis Wyness equalising. St Mirren's first notable win at the new stadium came on 7 March 2009 in a 1–0 victory over Celtic in the Scottish Cup quarter-final.

The stadium had a total seating capacity of 8,023 which was reduced in 2017 to 7,937 following the installation of a new disabled access platform.

The stadium was known as The Simple Digital Arena after the club agreed a four-year, six-figure deal with Simple Digital Solutions on 13 June 2018.

It is currently known as The Marbill Coaches Stadium.

== Colours and sponsors ==
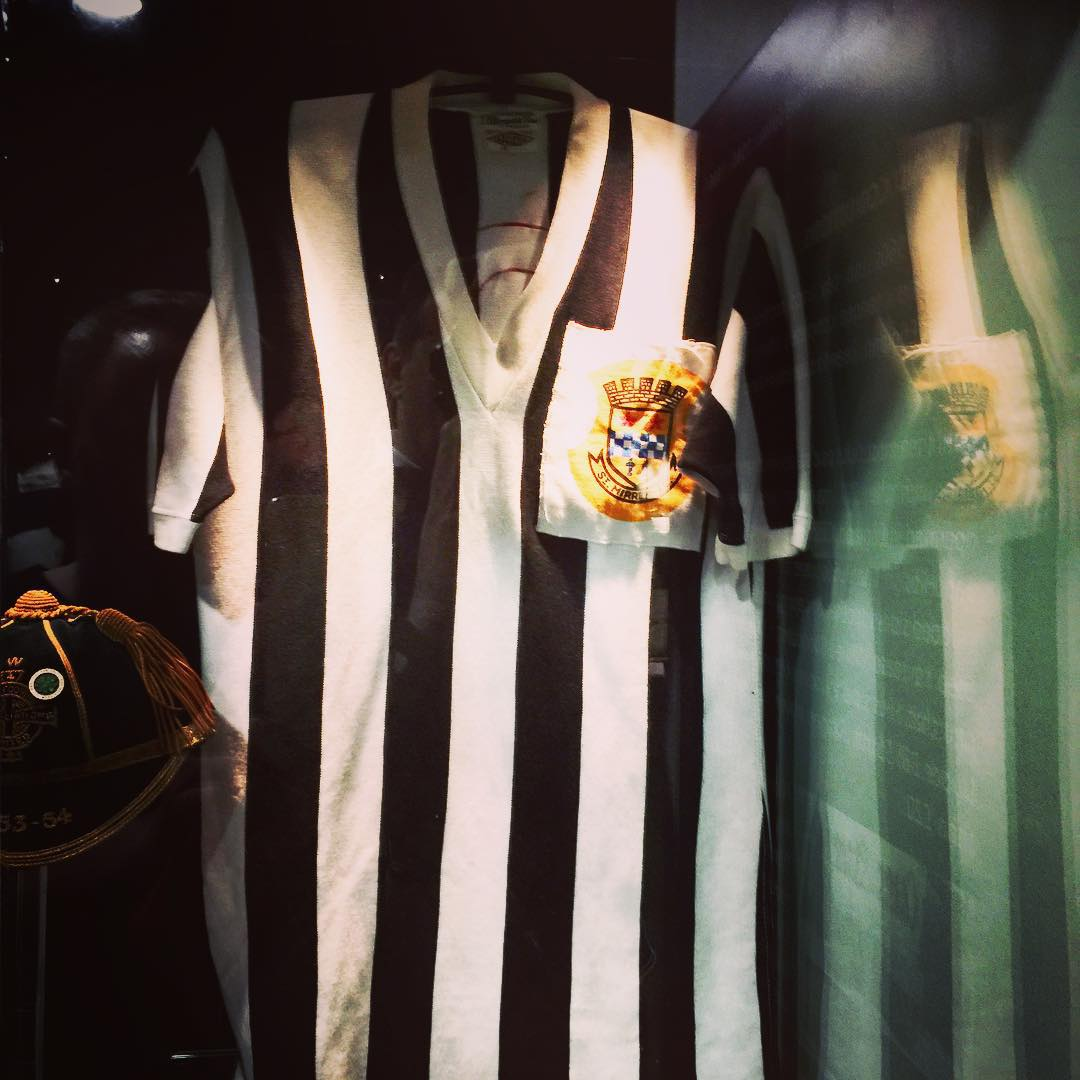
St. Mirren shirt exhibited at the Scottish Football Museum

The traditional home colours of St Mirren are black and white stripes, however for the first season the colours were scarlet and blue. There is some dispute as to why the colours black and white were chosen. A popular theory is that the stripes represent the Black and White Cart rivers which run through Paisley. In recent years there has been evidence unearthed that the Monks in the local abbey wore black and white striped habits. The team strips have varied very little in the long history of the club, however the thickness of the stripes have often varied. Some years have seen horizontal stripes used.

Having first played in black and white vertical stripes in 1884, Saints were the first club in the world to do so, six years before Notts County.

Away tops are traditionally red or all black, but in some cases strips have varied from orange to light blue, as seen on the 2010–11 strip. From 2007 to 2011, the Danish firm, Hummel International, replaced Xara as kit manufacturers. After spells with Carbrini (2011–2012, 2015–2017), Diadora (2012–2014) and Joma (2017–2023) the club signed a deal with kit manufacturers Macron.

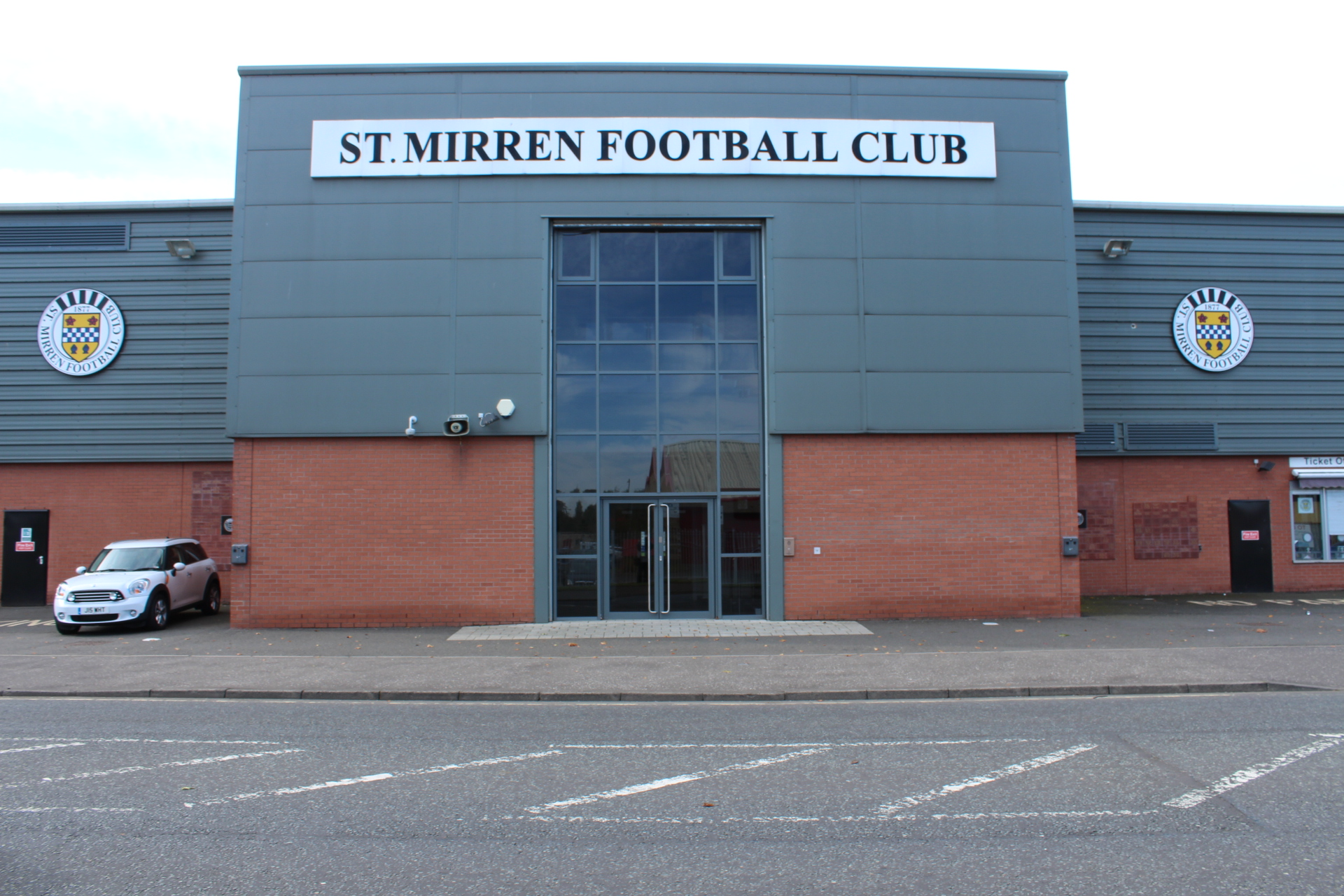
Club headquarters as seen in 2014

St Mirren has had several main sponsors, mainly in the transport industry, with several local bus companies and car dealerships like Arriva and Phoenix Honda sponsoring in the club. St Mirren were sponsored by Braehead Shopping Centre, a local shopping centre four miles away in Renfrew from 2005 to 2017. They are currently sponsored by Consilium Contracting Services. In August 2010, the club confirmed Barrhead company Compass Private Hire would have their name displayed on the back of the first team players' shirts as well as on their shorts. Compass Private Hire were co-owned by former St Mirren player, captain and manager, Tony Fitzpatrick.

Period	Kit manufacturer	Shirt sponsor (centre)	Shirt sponsor (sleeve)
1977–1981	Umbro	none	none
1981–1983	Adidas	none	none
1983–1987	Adidas	Graham's Buses	none
1987–1989	Matchwinner	Clydeside Scottish	none
1989–1992	Matchwinner	Kelvin Homes	none
1992–1993	Matchwinner	Ingram Volkswagen	none
1993–1994	Matchwinner	Clanford Ford	none
1994–1995	Core	Clanford Ford	none
1995–1996	Core	Phoenix Honda	none
1996–1997	Admiral	Phoenix Honda	none
1997–1998	Uhlsport	Phoenix Mitsubishi	none
1998–1999	Uhlsport	Arriva	none
1999–2000	Xara	Cetco	none
2000–2003	Xara	LDV Vans	none
2003–2005	Xara	Phoenix Kia / Phoenix Suzuki	none
2005–2007	Xara	Braehead Shopping Centre	none
2007–2011	Hummel	Braehead Shopping Centre	none
2011–2012	Carbrini Sportswear	Fila / Braehead Shopping Centre	none
2012–2013	Diadora	Diadora	none
2013–2014	Diadora	Blacks Life Outdoors	none
2014–2017	Carbrini Sportswear	JD Sports	none
2017–2020	Joma	Skyview Capital	none
2020–2021	Joma	Skyview Capital	Gennaro Glass & Glazing
2021–2023	Joma	Digby Brown	Gennaro Glass & Glazing
2023–2024	Macron	Digby Brown	Gennaro Glass & Glazing
2024–	Macron	Consilium Contracting Services	Gennaro Glass & Glazing

== Mascots ==
In recent years, St Mirren have been represented by three mascots, the Pandas. They are Paisley Panda, Junior P and Mrs Panda. The regular mascots are Paisley Panda and Junior P.

== Rivalries ==
The club has a fierce rivalry with neighbours Greenock Morton, a rivalry which sees a large amount of animosity between the two sets of fans.

== Club records ==
- Highest home attendance: 47,438 v. Celtic on 20 August 1949
- Highest average home attendance: 17,333, 1949–50 (15 games)
- Biggest victory: 15–0 v. Glasgow University, Scottish Cup, 30 January 1960
- Most capped player: Iain Munro and Billy Thomson: 7 appearances for Scotland
- Most capped international player: Mo Camara: 79 appearances for Guinea
- Youngest player: Marcello de Barros: 15 years & 218 days v. Dumbarton, 11 July 2026
- Most competitive appearances: Hugh Murray, 462 (1997–2012)
- Most league appearances: Hugh Murray, 399 (1997–2012)
- Most European appearances: Billy Abercromby, 9 (1980–1988)
- Most league goals: David McCrae, 221 (1923–1934)
- Most league goals in a season: Dunky Walker, 45 (1921–22)
- Record transfer fee paid: £400,000 to Bayer Uerdingen for Thomas Stickroth (March 1990)
- Record transfer fee received: £850,000 from Rangers for Ian Ferguson (February 1988)
- Most league wins in a season: 27, Division Two (1967–68)
- Most league defeats in a season: 31, Division One (1920–21)
- Most league draws in a season: 15, Premier League (1987–88)
- Most consecutive league victories: 16, Division Two (18 November 1967 – 30 March 1968)
- Longest unbeaten league run: 34, 18 November 1967 (Division Two) – 16 November 1968 (Division One)
- Most goals scored in a season: 100, Division Two (1967–68)
- Most goals conceded in a season: 92, Division One (1920–21)

== Players ==
=== First-team squad ===
As of 3 September 2026

Note: Flags indicate national team as defined under FIFA eligibility rules; some limited exceptions apply. Players may hold more than one non-FIFA nationality.

No.	Pos.	Nation	Player
1	GK	AUS	Jacob Chapman
2	DF	SKN	Jayden Richardson
3	DF	WAL	Declan John
4	MF	NIR	Liam Donnelly
5	DF	JAM	Richard King
6	DF	SCO	Louis Jackson
8	MF	SCO	Ryan Carr
9	FW	SCO	Eseosa Sule
10	MF	ESP	Samuel Ramos
11	FW	KEN	Jonah Ayunga
13	DF	CYP	Alex Gogić (vice-captain)
16	MF	ENG	Luke Thomas
17	MF	AUS	Keanu Baccus
18	MF	NED	Malik Dijksteel
19	FW	NED	Ismeal Kabia (on loan from Arsenal)

No.	Pos.	Nation	Player
20	FW	ENG	Jake Young
22	DF	SCO	Marcus Fraser (captain)
23	MF	SCO	Chris Mochrie
24	FW	SCO	Josh Farquhar
25	FW	SRB	Nikolas Agrafiotis
26	DF	SCO	Marcello De Barros
30	MF	SCO	Fraser Taylor
31	GK	SCO	Ryan Mullen
32	FW	SCO	Luke Douglas
35	GK	SCO	Grant Tamosevicius
37	MF	SCO	Carrick McEvoy
47	DF	SCO	Calvin Ramsay (on loan from Liverpool)
48	MF	ENG	Paul Nsio (on loan from Rangers)
53	DF	SCO	Henry Fieldson
88	MF	IRL	Killian Phillips

=== On loan ===
Note: Flags indicate national team as defined under FIFA eligibility rules; some limited exceptions apply. Players may hold more than one non-FIFA nationality.

No.	Pos.	Nation	Player
27	GK	SVK	Peter Urminský (on loan at Albion Rovers)
28	DF	SCO	Callum Penman (on loan at Stenhousemuir)
38	DF	SCO	Thomas Falconer (on loan at Kelty Hearts)
41	DF	SCO	Ruari Duff (on loan at Renfrew)
—	DF	SCO	Innes Clark (co-operation loan with Albion Rovers)
—	DF	SCO	Lyle Hunter (on loan at Clydebank)
—	DF	SCO	Jack O'Rourke (on loan at Cumnock Juniors)
—	DF	SCO	Ben Stoddart (on loan at Cumnock Juniors)
—	MF	SCO	Jude Freel (on loan at Cumbernauld Colts)

No.	Pos.	Nation	Player
—	MF	SCO	Lewis Hodgkiss (on loan at Stenhousemuir)
—	MF	SCO	Taylor Hogarth (on loan at Bonnyrigg Rose)
—	MF	SCO	Billy Hutchinson (on loan at Stirling Albion)
—	MF	SCO	Jack Lavery (on loan at Cumnock Juniors)
—	MF	SCO	Caiden McMillan (on loan at Benburb)
—	MF	SCO	Sam Robinson (on loan at Cumbernauld United)
—	MF	SCO	Struan Thompson (on loan at Caledonian Braves)
—	FW	SCO	Rory MacKay (on loan at Cumbernauld United)
—	FW	SCO	Theo McCormick (on loan at Kelty Hearts)

== Club staff ==
=== Coaching staff ===
Name	Role
Craig McLeish	Manager
Marc Kelly	Assistant manager
Burton O'Brien	First team coach
Jamie Langfield	Goalkeeping and set piece coach
Allan McManus	Head of academy
Scott Galloway	Head of academy coaching and player development
Gavin Miller	Head of recruitment and emerging talent
Ross Horsburgh	Head of analysis
Aiden Brotherton; Allen McDougall	Analysts
Brad Steedman	Head of medical
Gary McColl	Head of sports science
Tommy Docherty	Groundsman
Joe Hayes	Kitman

=== Board of directors ===
Name	Role
John Needham	Chairman
Ian Beattie	Director
Dougie Falconer	Director
Jim Irvine	Director
Paul McNeill	Director
Gary Peebles	Director
Gordon Graham	Secretary
Keith Lasley	Chief executive officer
Tony Fitzpatrick	Club ambassador

== Managers ==
- John McCartney (June 1904 – January 1910)
- Barry Grieve (February – June 1910)
- Hugh Law (July 1910 – July 1916)
- Johnny Cochrane (July 1916 – April 1928)
- Donald Turner (April 1928 – April 1929)
- John Morrison (June 1929 – October 1936)
- Sam Blythe (October 1936 – February 1941)
- Donald Menzies (February 1941 – December 1942)
- Willie Fotheringham (December 1942 – May 1945)
- Bobby Rankin (May 1945 – August 1954)
- Willie Reid (August 1954 – December 1961)
- Bobby Flavell (December 1961 – December 1962)
- Jackie Cox (December 1962 – May 1965)
- Doug Millward (June 1965 – December 1966)
- Alex Wright (December 1966 – October 1970)
- Wilson Humphries (November 1970 – January 1972)
- Tommy Bryceland (January 1972 – May 1973)
- Willie Cunningham (June 1973 – October 1974)
- Alex Ferguson (October 1974 – May 1978)
- Jim Clunie (June 1978 – November 1980)
- Rikki McFarlane (November 1980 – October 1983)
- Alex Miller (October 1983 – December 1986)
- Alex Smith (December 1986 – April 1988)
- Tony Fitzpatrick (April 1988 – May 1991)
- David Hay (May 1991 – May 1992)
- Jimmy Bone (May 1992 – August 1996)
- Iain Munro (9 September 1996 – 10 September 1996) (24 hours)
- Tony Fitzpatrick (September 1996 – December 1998)
- Tom Hendrie (December 1998 – September 2002)
- John Coughlin (September 2002 – November 2003)
- Gus MacPherson (25 November 2003 – 11 May 2010)
- Danny Lennon (7 June 2010 – 12 May 2014)
- Tommy Craig (13 May 2014 – 9 December 2014)
- Gary Teale (9 December 2014 – 23 May 2015)
- Ian Murray (24 May 2015 – 12 December 2015)
- Alex Rae (18 December 2015 – 18 September 2016)
- Allan McManus (18 September 2016 – 10 October 2016) (interim)
- Jack Ross (10 October 2016 –25 May 2018)
- Alan Stubbs (8 June 2018 – 3 September 2018)
- Oran Kearney (7 September 2018 – 26 June 2019)
- Jim Goodwin (28 June 2019 – 19 February 2022)
- Stephen Robinson (22 February 2022 – 12 March 2026)
- Craig McLeish (12 March 2026 – present)

== European record ==
Season	Competition	Round	Opponent	Home	Away	Aggregate
1980–81	UEFA Cup	First round	(Sweden) IF Elfsborg	0–0	2–1	2–1
1980–81	UEFA Cup	Second round	(France) Saint-Étienne	0–0	0–2	0–2
1983–84	UEFA Cup	First round	(Netherlands) Feyenoord	0–1	0–2	0–3
1985–86	UEFA Cup	First round	(Czechoslovakia) Slavia Prague	3–0 (a.e.t.)	0–1	3–1
1985–86	UEFA Cup	Second round	(Sweden) Hammarby IF	1–2	3–3	4–5
1987–88	UEFA Cup Winners' Cup	First round	(Norway) Tromsø	1–0	0–0	1–0
1987–88	UEFA Cup Winners' Cup	Second round	(Belgium) Mechelen	0–2	0–0	0–2
2024–25	UEFA Conference League	Second qualifying round	(Iceland) Valur	4–1	0–0	4–1
2024–25	UEFA Conference League	Third qualifying round	(Norway) SK Brann	1–1	1–3	2–4

== Honours ==
- Scottish Cup:
  - Winners (3): 1925–26, 1958–59, 1986–87
  - Runners-up: 1907–08, 1933–34, 1961–62
- Scottish League Cup:
  - Winners (2): 2012–13, 2025–26
  - Runners-up: 1955–56, 2009–10
- Scottish Challenge Cup:
  - Winners (1): 2005
  - Runners-up: 1993, 2017
- Division Two / First Division / Scottish Championship (5): (Note: From 1893 to 1975, Division Two was the second tier of league football. With the introduction of the Premier Division in 1975, the second tier became known as the First Division. Since 2013, the second tier has been named the Championship.) 1967–68, 1976–77, 1999–2000, 2005–06, 2017–18
- Renfrewshire Cup (55): 1882–83, 1883–84, 1887–88, 1890–91, 1893–94, 1896–97, 1897–98, 1903–04, 1909–10, 1910–11, 1923–24, 1924–25, 1925–26, 1927–28, 1928–29, 1929–30, 1931–32, 1932–33, 1933–34, 1935–36, 1937–38, 1940–41, 1943–44, 1945–46, 1946–47, 1947–48, 1949–50, 1958–59, 1959–60, 1960–61, 1962–63, 1966–67, 1973–74, 1976–77, 1978–79, 1979–80, 1982–83, 1983–84, 1984–85, 1985–86, 1987–88, 1989–90, 1997–98, 1998–99, 1999–2000, 2000–01, 2001–02, 2006–07, 2007–08, 2008–09, 2009–10, 2010–11, 2011–12, 2012–13, 2014–15
- Victory Cup: 1919
- Anglo-Scottish Cup:
  - Winners (1): 1979–80
  - Runners-up: 1977–78
- Summer Cup: 1943
- Epson Invitational Tournament: 1986–87
- Barcelona Cup Winners: 1922

== Other sports ==
Robert Mitchell of St Mirren F.C. won the Scottish 880 yards title five times between 1889 and 1894, missing only in 1893, and shares with Duncan McPhee (West of Scotland H., 1914 to 1923) the most wins in this event in Scottish AAA history. He also set Scottish records at two distances. At the St Mirren FC Sports, at West March, Paisley, on 19 July 1890 he ran 2:00 2/5 to establish a new Scottish All-comers record for 880 yards, beating a record set by Thomas Moffat at the Scottish championships in 1883. And at the Rangers Sports at Ibrox Park, Glasgow, on 3 August 1889 he ran 1:15 3/5 to establish new Scottish All-comers and Native records for 600 yards. In 1898 he was permanently suspended from amateur athletics for collaborating with betting on races.
