= Ryan Carr (footballer) =

Footballer (born 2004)

Personal information
- Full name: Ryan George Carr
- Date of birth: 23 September 2004 (age 22)
- Place of birth: Durham, England
- Height: 1.82 m (6 ft 0 in)
- Position: Midfielder

Team information
- Current team: St Mirren

Youth career
- Carlisle United

Senior career*
| Years | Team | Apps | (Gls) |
| 2022–2023 | Carlisle United | 1 | (0) |
| 2023–2026 | Ipswich Town | 0 | (0) |
| 2024 | → Aveley (loan) | 11 | (0) |
| 2024 | → Gateshead (loan) | 3 | (0) |
| 2025–2026 | → Ebbsfleet United (loan) | 10 | (1) |
| 2026– | St Mirren | 11 | (0) |

International career
| 2025– | Scotland U21 | 4 | (0) |
- * Club domestic league appearances and goals as of 12:02, 24 June 2026 (UTC)

Ryan George Carr (born 23 September 2004) is a professional footballer who plays as a midfielder for St Mirren.

== Career ==
Carr made his first-team debut at Carlisle United playing at right wing-back on 20 September 2022, in a 1–1 draw with Fleetwood Town in an EFL Trophy fixture at Brunton Park. Manager Paul Simpson said that: "I just think he's got energy, and enthusiasm about him. I thought he did well".

On 31 January 2023, Carr joined League One side Ipswich Town for an undisclosed fee.

Having made 10 appearance during a loan spell with Aveley in the National League South at the end of the 2023-24 season, as well as an appearance in the playoffs, Carr joined Vanarama National League side Gateshead on loan until January 5, 2025. On 18 January 2025, he returned to the National League on loan, joining bottom side Ebbsfleet United for the remainder of the season.

== Career statistics ==
As of match played 20 September 2022

Appearances and goals by club, season and competition
| Club | Season | League | | | FA Cup | | EFL Cup | | Other | | Total | |
| Club | Season | Division | Apps | Goals | Apps | Goals | Apps | Goals | Apps | Goals | Apps | Goals |
|---|---|---|---|---|---|---|---|---|---|---|---|---|
| Carlisle United | 2022–23 | EFL League Two | 0 | 0 | 0 | 0 | 0 | 0 | 1 (Note: Appearance/s in the EFL Trophy) | 0 | 1 | 0 |
| Career total | | | 0 | 0 | 0 | 0 | 0 | 0 | 1 | 0 | 1 | 0 |
