= 2025 Scottish Cup final =

Football match

- Event: 2024–25 Scottish Cup
| Aberdeen | Celtic |
| 1 | 1 |
- After extra time Aberdeen won 4–3 on penalties
- Date: 24 May 2025
- Venue: Hampden Park, Glasgow
- Man of the Match: Mats Knoester
- Referee: Don Robertson
- Attendance: 49,545

The 2025 Scottish Cup final was the final match of the 2024–25 Scottish Cup, the 140th edition of Scotland's most prestigious knockout football competition. It was contested by seven-time winners Aberdeen and 42-time winners and holders Celtic at Hampden Park, Glasgow, on 24 May 2025.

Aberdeen defeated Celtic 4–3 on penalties, after both teams scored an own goal, winning the former its first major trophy since the 2013–14 Scottish League Cup, and their first Scottish Cup title since 1989–90. Aberdeen's goalkeeper Dimitar Mitov saved the first and last penalty kicks from Celtic, while Aberdeen scored on all four attempts.

== Background ==
The 2025 final was Aberdeen's 17th appearance in a Scottish Cup final, while it was a record 62nd final appearance for Celtic.

== Road to the final ==
| Aberdeen | | Round | Celtic | |
| Opposition | Score | Round | Opposition | Score |
|---|---|---|---|---|
| Elgin City (A) | 3–0 | 4th | Kilmarnock (H) | 2–1 |
| Dunfermline Athletic (H) | 3–0 | 5th | Raith Rovers (H) | 5–0 |
| Queen's Park (H) | 4–1 | QF | Hibernian (H) | 2–0 |
| Heart of Midlothian (N) | 2–1 (a.e.t.) | SF | St Johnstone (N) | 5–0 |
Key: (H) = Home venue; (A) = Away venue; (N) = Neutral venue

== Match ==
=== Summary ===
In the 39th minute Celtic took the lead when a corner from Arne Engels from the left was headed on by Cameron Carter-Vickers before flicking off Alfie Dorrington and going into the right corner of the net off the post for an own goal. It was 1-1 in the 83rd minute when Shayden Morris hit a low cross from the right which Celtic goalkeeper Kasper Schmeichel attempted to flick away but only diverted it into his own net for another own goal. The match ended 1-1 and went to a penalty shoot-out after a goalless period of extra-time. In the penalty shoot-out Aberdeen goalkeeper Dimitar Mitov saved down low to his right from Callum McGregor and Alistair Johnston as Aberdeen went on to win 4-3 on penalties for a first Scottish Cup victory in 35 years.

=== Details ===
24 May 2025
15:00 BST

| Aberdeen | 1–1 (a.e.t.) | Celtic |
|---|---|---|
| Schmeichel 83' (o.g.) | Report | Dorrington 39' (o.g.) |
Penalties
| Shinnie (penalty scored); Polvara (penalty scored); Dabbagh (penalty scored); Palaversa (penalty scored) | 4–3 | (penalty missed) McGregor; (penalty scored) Kenny; (penalty scored) McCowan; (penalty scored) Maeda; (penalty missed) Johnston |

Hampden Park, Glasgow
Attendance: 49,545
Referee: Don Robertson

| Aberdeen | Celtic |

| GK | 1 | (Bulgaria) Dimitar Mitov |
| RB | 28 | (Denmark) Alexander Jensen |
| CB | 5 | (Netherlands) Mats Knoester | (yellow card) 90+6' |
| CB | 22 | (Scotland) Jack Milne | | (substituted off) 94' |
| CB | 26 | (England) Alfie Dorrington | | (substituted off) 80' |
| LB | 2 | (Scotland) Nicky Devlin | | (substituted off) 91' |
| CM | 10 | (England) Leighton Clarkson | | (substituted off) 79' |
| CM | 4 | (Scotland) Graeme Shinnie (c) | (yellow card) 45' |
| CM | 18 | (Croatia) Ante Palaversa | (yellow card) 93' |
| CF | 9 | (Scotland) Kevin Nisbet | | (substituted off) 79' |
| CF | 81 | (Finland) Topi Keskinen | | (substituted off) 58' |
Substitutes:
| GK | 31 | (Scotland) Ross Doohan |
| DF | 3 | (Scotland) Jack MacKenzie | | (substituted on) 91' |
| DF | 24 | (Latvia) Kristers Tobers | | (substituted on) 94' |
| MF | 8 | (United States) Dante Polvara | | (substituted on) 79' |
| MF | 20 | (England) Shayden Morris | | (substituted on) 80' |
| MF | 30 | (Scotland) Fletcher Boyd |
| FW | 11 | (Palestine) Oday Dabbagh | | (substituted on) 79' |
| FW | 14 | (Senegal) Pape Habib Gueye | | (substituted on) 58' |
Manager:
(Sweden) Jimmy Thelin

| GK | 1 | (Denmark) Kasper Schmeichel |
| RB | 2 | (Canada) Alistair Johnston |
| CB | 20 | (United States) Cameron Carter-Vickers | (yellow card) 45' |
| CB | 5 | (Republic of Ireland) Liam Scales |
| LB | 3 | (Scotland) Greg Taylor |
| CM | 28 | (Portugal) Paulo Bernardo | | (substituted off) 99' |
| CM | 42 | (Scotland) Callum McGregor (c) |
| CM | 27 | (Belgium) Arne Engels | | (substituted off) 65' |
| RW | 10 | (Germany) Nicolas Kühn | | (substituted off) 65' |
| CF | 9 | (Republic of Ireland) Adam Idah | | (substituted off) 66' |
| LW | 38 | (Japan) Daizen Maeda |
Substitutes:
| GK | 12 | (Finland) Viljami Sinisalo |
| DF | 6 | (United States) Auston Trusty |
| DF | 15 | (Ghana) Jeffrey Schlupp | | (substituted on) 99' |
| DF | 56 | (Scotland) Anthony Ralston |
| MF | 14 | (Scotland) Luke McCowan | | (substituted on) 65' |
| MF | 49 | (Scotland) James Forrest | | (substituted on) 65' | (substituted off) 96' |
| FW | 13 | (South Korea) Yang Hyun-jun | (yellow card) 90+3' | (substituted on) 66' |
| FW | 24 | (Republic of Ireland) Johnny Kenny | | (substituted on) 96' |
Manager:
(Northern Ireland) Brendan Rodgers

Assistant referees:
Ross MacLeod
David Dunne
Fourth official:
Colin Steven
Video assistant referee:
Greg Aitken
Assistant video assistant referee:
Sean Carr

Match rules

- 90 minutes
- 30 minutes of extra time if necessary
- Penalty shoot-out if scores still level
- Eight named substitutes
- Maximum of five substitutions, with a sixth allowed in extra time

Match rules

- 90 minutes
- 30 minutes of extra time if necessary
- Penalty shoot-out if scores still level
- Eight named substitutes
- Maximum of five substitutions in normal time (a sixth substitute is permitted in extra time)

== Media coverage ==
BBC Scotland and Premier Sports broadcast the final, in what was the first season of a new five-year deal in the United Kingdom to broadcast Scottish Cup matches.

== Victory Parade ==
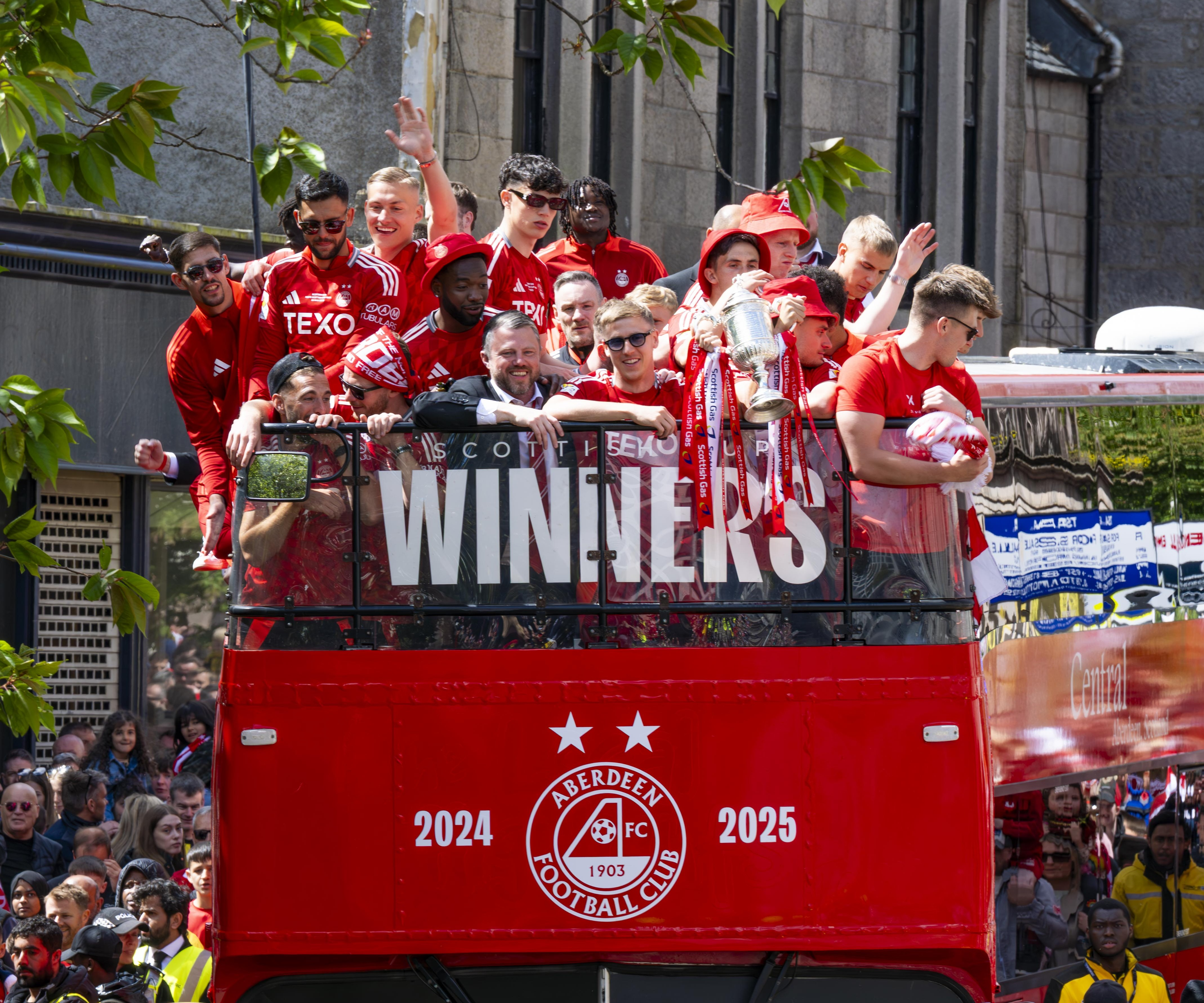
Jimmy Thelin and the Aberdeen cup-winning squad on an open top bus on Schoolhill, Aberdeen, 25 May 2025

The Aberdeen squad took part in a victory parade around Aberdeen city centre, on Sunday 25 May 2025, culminating in Aberdeen City Council hosting the squad on the balcony of the Townhouse.
