= 2024–25 Aberdeen F.C. season =

Aberdeen
2024–25 season
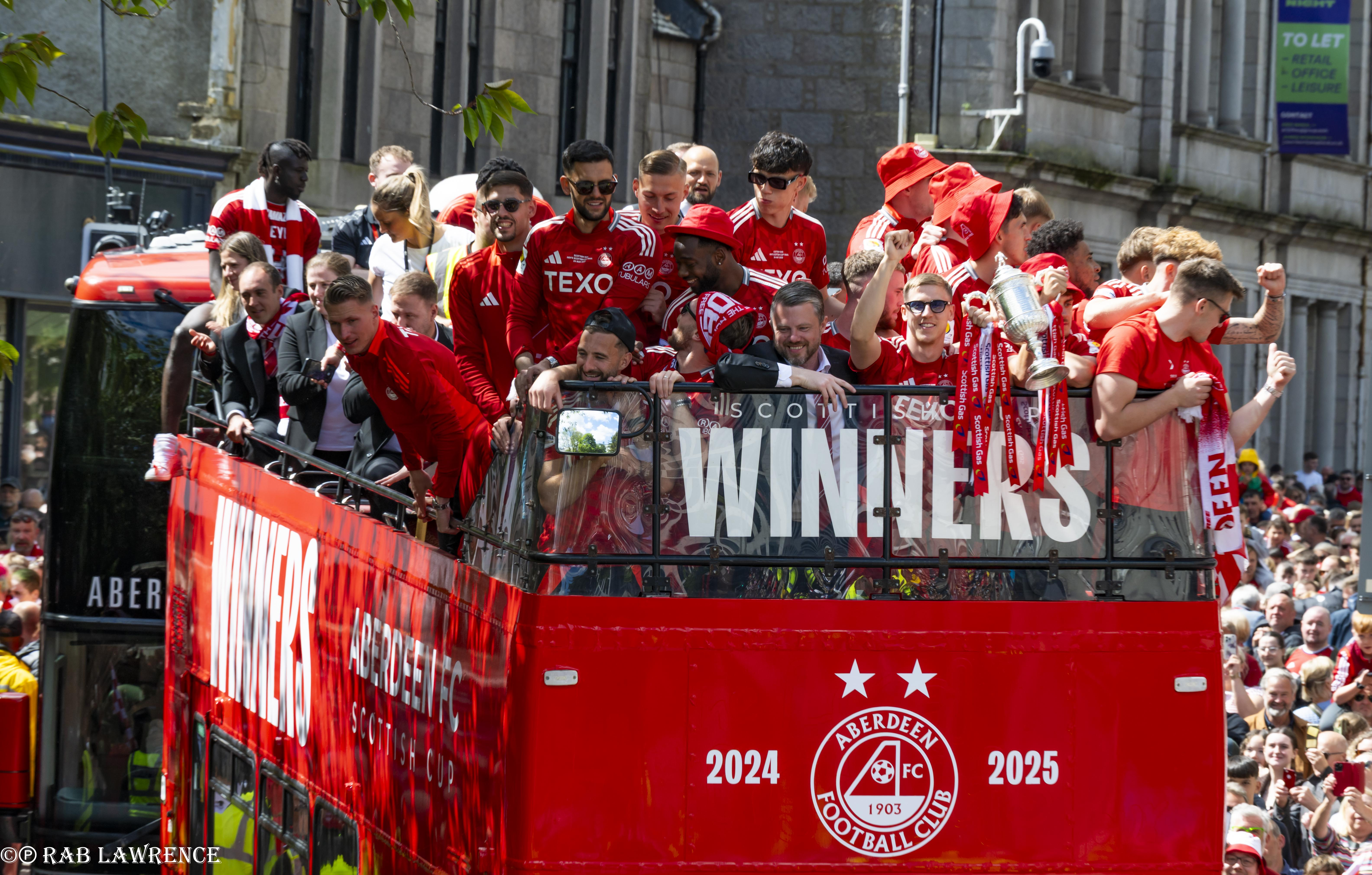
- The Aberdeen squad which won the 2024–25 Scottish Cup during a victory parade in the city on the day after the final
- Chairman: Dave Cormack
- Manager: Jimmy Thelin
- Ground: Pittodrie Stadium; Aberdeen, Scotland (Capacity: 20,866)
- Scottish Premiership: 5th
- Scottish Cup: Winners
- Scottish League Cup: Semi-finals
- Top goalscorer: League: Kevin Nisbet (11); All: Kevin Nisbet (14)
- Highest home attendance: 19,274 vs. Multiple, Premiership, October 2024 – March 2025
- Lowest home attendance: 8,450 vs. Dumbarton, League Cup, 27 July 2024
- Average home league attendance: 17,735
Home colours	Away colours	Third colours

The 2024–25 Aberdeen F.C. season was Aberdeen's 112th season in the top flight of Scottish football and the twelfth in the Scottish Premiership. Aberdeen also competed in the Scottish Cup and Scottish League Cup.

Aberdeen finished the season by winning their first Scottish Cup in 35 years after defeating Celtic on penalties in the final. This was also their first title since 2014. In the league, Aberdeen finished fifth after a very strong start was followed up by only five wins in 27 games. Due to the cup win, the team qualified for the 2025–26 UEFA Europa League play-off round for the next season.

== Summary ==
=== June ===
On 3 June, new manager Jimmy Thelin officially took charge replacing interim coach Peter Leven. On 6 June, after making over 350 appearances player-coach Jonny Hayes left the club and later announced his retirement from football. Youngster Fletcher Boyd signed a new contract until 2027. Kelle Roos, Connor Barron, Anthony Stewart, Kieran Ngwenya, Finlay Murray, Kai Watson, Chris Kondolo, Aaron Reid, and Reuben Smillie all left the club. Defender Gavin Molloy signed from Shelbourne, striker Peter Ambrose from Újpest and Dimitar Mitov from fellow Premiership side St Johnstone all for undisclosed fees. The Dons announced they will travel to Portugal for a pre-season training camp and have a friendly against Peterhead with an XI select against Huntly and Turriff United.

=== July ===
Aberdeen's pre-season friendly with Peterhead was moved to Cormack Park due to weather conditions in Peterhead with the Dons winning 4–0. On 11 July, forward Duk was announced missing from training by the club with the player going AWOL. Aberdeen took disciplinary action against the Cape Verde international. On 12 July, Dante Polvara suffered an injury and is set to be ruled out for at least four months and Norwegian midfielder Sivert Heltne Nilsen joined from SK Brann. The club opened the season with a 3–0 win over Queen of the South in the League Cup. This was followed with wins against East Kilbride, Airdrieonians and Dumbarton to top the group and setup a Second round tie with Queens Park. Leighton Clarkson was ruled out for eight weeks with a shoulder injury and Junior Hoilett was not offered a new deal and left the club.

=== August ===
Youngsters Adam Emslie and Finday Marshall joined Cove Rangers on loan deals along with Blair McKenzie who joined Montrose. Aberdeen began the League season with an away win against St Johnstone. Ante Palaversa joined the club from Troyes for an undisclosed fee and also Finnish winger Topi Keskinen signed from HJK Helsinki for a reported £860,000. Macedonian forward Bojan Miovski was given a send-off from fans in the win against St Mirren as he later signed for Spanish La Liga side Girona for a club-record fee of £6,800,000. Keskinen scored a 92nd minute winner against Queens Park in the League Cup to setup a tie with The Spartans. Ryan Duncan later joined Queens on loan for the season. Defender Richard Jensen also went out on loan to Vejle. The Dons then signed Kevin Nisbet on a loan deal from English Championship side Millwall. He made his debut in the home win against Kilmarnock with striker Pape Habib Guèye scoring both goals with headers. Defender Jayden Richardson left the club on transfer deadline day. A 98th minute winner from Nisbet seen Aberdeen briefly top the league at the end of the month with the club having won every game of the season so far

=== September ===
Call-ups for the September Internationals included Jack Milne, Alfie Bavidge and Fletcher Boyd for Scotland youths, Topi Keskinen for Finland, Dimitar Mitov for Bulgaria and Slobodan Rubezic for Montenegro. An Aberdeen XI played in a Testimonial match at Cove for their player Blair Yule with both Shayden Morris and Kevin Nisbet scoring. On 7 September, the club announced Duk had returned to training having gone missing earlier in July. The Dons remained on their winning run with wins against Motherwell and Dundee and also in the League Cup against The Spartans, setting up a tie with Celtic in the Semi-finals at Hampden.

=== October ===
On 1 October, Nicky Devlin received his first Scotland call-up for the UEFA Nations League matches against Croatia and Portugal. Pape Habib Guèye was ruled out for fourteen weeks with a quad muscle tear he picked up in training. After the International break, the Dons came from two goals down to draw away to Celtic. This was followed with a battling win against Dundee United as Peter Ambrose scored his first league goal. The unbeaten run continued with an impressive and enthralling win also at home to Rangers.

=== November ===
However, the unbeaten domestic run ended in devastating fashion at Hampden as Daizen Maeda scored a hat-trick in a 6–0 mauling. Young goalkeeper Rodrigo Vitols signed a contract extension, keeping him at the Club until at least 2027. Manager Jimmy Thelin was named Scottish Premiership manager of the month for October and Nicky Devlin was named Player of the month. They bounced back at home to Dundee, the fourth sell-out in-a-row at Pittodrie. The club reported a record turnover of £23.6 million in its annual accounts for the year ended 30 June 2024, an increase of 49% on the previous year’s £15.8million turnover. The unbeaten League run came to an end at a snowy St Mirren Park thanks to a 2–1 loss which also included a red card overturned by VAR. Three goals in added time at Easter Road saw the Dons in a pulsating 3–3 draw with Hibernian, where Sokler scored a brilliant overhead kick only to be pegged back by Rocky Bushiri's first goal for the home side.

=== December ===
Goalkeeper Dimitar Mitov was injured in the draw at Hearts, ruling him out for up to six weeks. In the Scottish Cup, the Dons were drawn away to Elgin City in January. Their unbeaten home record came to an end in a tight 1–0 loss to Celtic. They were then left frustrated in a wet and windy afternoon at Pittodrie which seen them battle to a draw against St Johnstone. The annual AGM took place with chairman Dave Cormack confirming the tribunal fee for last seasons want away midfielder Connor Barron to Rangers had still not been paid. The miserable run in the League continued with successive losses, firstly after leading against Hibernian, a 4–0 hammering at Kilmarnock on Boxing Day, and at Tannadice against Dundee United to a 94th minute winner for the home side.

=== January ===
A tribunal fee was agreed for Connor Barron with Rangers but the club unhappy with the process but in return a guaranteed sum of £639,920, with an additional £250,000 dependant on performance. Goalkeeper Mitov was again ruled out for four weeks with a minor injury. The Dons seen in the new year in a blizzard of snow at home to Ross County but lost 2-1. Both Gavin Molloy and Ester Sokler were injured and later confirmed to be ruled out of action, Molloy until May and Sokler for at least eight weeks. Youngster Dylan Lobban extended his stay at Cove Rangers until the end of the season whilst Alfie Bavidge was recalled from his loan but then sent out to Inverness Caledonian Thistle along with youth captain Alfie Stewart. The first team continued to struggle, losing again away to Motherwell with Rubezic sent off for an apparent head-butting. Croatian midfielder Ante Palaversa signed a two-year contract extension, tying him to the club until the summer of 2027. The club added further signings of Jeppe Okkels on loan from English Championship side Preston North End and Latvia captain Kristers Tobers from Grasshoppers for a reported £800,000. Ross Doohan saved a ninety-third minute penalty in a goalless draw at home to Hearts. Centre-back Alfie Dorrington joined on loan from English Premiership side Tottenham Hotspur and full back Alexander Jensen signed from Swedish side Brommapojkarna for a reported £600,000. However defeats followed away to Rangers and at home to St Mirren. On 17 January, Aberdeen born Scotland Forward and Ballon d'Or winner Denis Law died aged 84. The club began their Scottish Cup run with a victory at Elgin City. On 19 January, former manager Jimmy Calderwood died aged 69. James McGarry joined Greek side Athens Kallithea on a loan deal.

=== February ===
The club endured their fourteenth League match without a win with defeat at Hibernian. On transfer deadline day, Duk left to join La Liga side Leganés for £600,000, Dutch centre-back Mats Knoester joined from Hungarian side Ferencváros and Palestine forward Oday Dabbagh signed on loan from Belgium side Charleroi with the option to buy. Defender Angus MacDonald left on a free to join Exeter City and fellow defender Slobodan Rubežić left on loan to join his former side Novi Pazar ten days later. A win against Dunfermline Athletic seen them into the Scottish Cup Quarter Finals. They ended the winless run with victory at Dens Park by edging Dundee and reclaiming third place with an "outrageous" goal from Topi Keskinen. Oday Dabbagh's injury-time goal edged out Kilmarnock at Pittodrie. But a ruthless Celtic again cruised past the Dons with Morris' ninetieth-minute goal a mere consolation. The club announced before the match injured forward Jamie McGrath will leave the club at the end of the season following the expiry of his contract and join fellow Premiership side Hibernian.

=== March ===
Kevin Nisbet struck in stoppage time as they came from 2–0 down to earn a point at home to Dundee United. Aberdeen sealed their passage to the Scottish Cup semi-finals in comfortable fashion as they put four past Queen's Park. This was followed up with a drab goalless draw away to St Johnstone. The International break again seen Dimitar Mitov pick up an injury. He did pick up an award for the third best footballer of the year for Bulgaria. After going behind against Motherwell at home, they romped to victory to secure their place in the League's top six.

=== April ===
Shayden Morris scored a brilliant solo goal to see off Ross County at Dingwall. Scotland U21 international Jack Milne penned a new long-term contract seeing the defender remain until at least 2029. The Dons blew a two goal lead against Ten-man Rangers as the Ibrox side staged an incredible comeback to snatch a last-gasp draw at Pittodrie. A trip to Glasgow seen the club win the Scottish Cup Semi-Final in extra-time against nine-man Hearts 2–1 at Hampden Park with a 119th-minute winner from Oday Dabbagh. It will be their first Final since 2017 which was also against Celtic. Kevin Nisbet's stunning strike condemned former club Hibernian to defeat and moved Aberdeen level on points with the Easter Road club. Manager Jimmy Thelin was given the Manager of the Month award for a third time after also receiving it in August and October.

=== May ===
The Dons lost out to St Mirren in a tight game won with a single goal Mikael Mandron. Over 20,000 Dons supporters bought tickets for the Cup Final and sold out their allocation. A poor second half from the Dons saw them well beaten by Rangers in Glasgow. They were guaranteed a return to European football next season despite a heavy home loss to Celtic. The League season ended with defeat away to Dundee United, with the Dons finishing in fifth place. But the match was marred with a pitch invasion and a Dons supporter throwing a seat and hitting defender Jack MacKenzie who suffered a facial injury. The 31 year old supporter was later charged for the incident for "acting in a culpable and reckless manner". Aberdeen finished the season by winning their first Scottish Cup in 35 years after defeating Celtic on penalties in the final.

== Results & fixtures ==
Win Draw Loss Postponed

=== Pre-season and friendlies ===
10 July 2024 Friendly	Peterhead	0–4	Aberdeen	Aberdeen
19:00		Report	Sokler 28', 37'; Shinnie 41'; Bavidge 52'	Stadium: Cormack Park; Attendance: 0 Referee: Chris Fordyce

=== Scottish Premiership ===
5 August 2024 1	St Johnstone	1–2	Aberdeen	Perth
20:00	Molloy 88' (o.g.)		Devlin 22'; McGrath 62'	Stadium: McDiarmid Park; Attendance: 9,203; Referee: Kevin Clancy
Note: Game televised on Sky Sports

11 August 2024 2	Aberdeen	3–1	St Mirren	Aberdeen
15:00	Guèye 39'; McGrath 54'; Besuijen 81'	Report	Olusanya 45+3'	Stadium: Pittodrie Stadium; Attendance: 17,057; Referee: Grant Irvine
Note: Date change due to St Mirren participation in Europe.

25 August 2024 3	Aberdeen	2–0	Kilmarnock	Aberdeen
15:00	Guèye 23', 65'	Report	Lyons (red card) 54'	Stadium: Pittodrie Stadium; Attendance: 16,146; Referee: Matthew MacDermid
Note: Date change due to Kilmarnock participation in Europe.

31 August 2024 4	Ross County	0–1	Aberdeen	Dingwall
17:45		Report	Nisbet 90+8'	Stadium: Victoria Park; Attendance: 5,480; Referee: Euan Anderson
Note: Game televised on Premier Sports

14 September 2024 5	Aberdeen	2–1	Motherwell	Aberdeen
15:00	Guèye 27', 80'	Report	Ebiye 88'	Stadium: Pittodrie Stadium; Attendance: 17,155; Referee: Chris Graham

28 September 2024 6	Dundee	1–2	Aberdeen	Dundee
15:00	Murray 45' (pen.)	Report	Nisbet 15'; Keskinen 32'	Stadium: Dens Park; Attendance: 9,030; Referee: Calum Scott

6 October 2024 7	Aberdeen	3–2	Heart of Midlothian	Aberdeen
15:00	Keskinen 2'; Devlin 65'; Palaversa 88'	Report	Kent 36'; Spittal 63'; Grant (red card) 75'	Stadium: Pittodrie Stadium; Attendance: 19,172; Referee: John Beaton
Note: Date change due to Hearts participation in Europe.

19 October 2024 8	Celtic	2–2	Aberdeen	Glasgow
15:00	Hatate 24'; Furuhashi 27'	Report	Sokler 50'; Shinnie 60'	Stadium: Celtic Park; Attendance: 58,890; Referee: Nick Walsh

26 October 2024 9	Aberdeen	1–0	Dundee United	Aberdeen
17:45	Ambrose 84'	Report		Stadium: Pittodrie Stadium; Attendance: 19,274; Referee: Steven McLean

30 October 2024 10	Aberdeen	2–1	Rangers	Aberdeen
20:00	Devlin 31'; Morris 74'	Report	Bajrami 63'	Stadium: Pittodrie Stadium; Attendance: 19,274; Referee: John Beaton

9 November 2024 11	Aberdeen	4–1	Dundee	Aberdeen
17:30	Palaversa 53'; Keskinen 57'; Besuijen 72'; Nisbet 90+7'	Report	Murray 70'	Stadium: Pittodrie Stadium; Attendance: 19,274; Referee: David Dickinson

23 November 2024 12	St Mirren	2–1	Aberdeen	Paisley
15:00	Olusanya 19'; Taylor 83'	Report	McGrath 50'	Stadium: St Mirren Park; Attendance: 7,533; Referee: John Beaton

26 November 2024 13	Hibernian	3–3	Aberdeen	Edinburgh
19:45	Newell 40'; Cadden 90+2'; Bushiri 90+6'	Report	McGrath 55'; Devlin 76'; Sokler 90+5'	Stadium: Easter Road; Attendance: 15,845; Referee: Calum Scott

1 December 2024 14	Heart of Midlothian	1–1	Aberdeen	Edinburgh
15:00	Devlin 62' (o.g.)	Report	Clarkson 37'	Stadium: Tynecastle Park; Attendance: 18,810; Referee: Kevin Clancy
Note: Date change due to Hearts participation in Europe.

4 December 2024 15	Aberdeen	0–1	Celtic	Aberdeen
20:00		Report	Hatate 78'	Stadium: Pittodrie Stadium; Attendance: 18,043; Referee: Don Robertson

7 December 2024 16	Aberdeen	1–1	St Johnstone	Aberdeen
15:00	Clarkson 56'	Report	Kirk 25'	Stadium: Pittodrie Stadium; Attendance: 15,880; Referee: Ross Hardie

21 December 2024 17	Aberdeen	1–3	Hibernian	Aberdeen
15:00	Keskinen 14'	Report	Youan 18'; Cadden 35'; Boyle 49'	Stadium: Pittodrie Stadium; Attendance: 18,375; Referee: Steven McLean

26 December 2024 19	Kilmarnock	4–0	Aberdeen	Kilmarnock
15:00	Vassell 18'; Watson 59'; Cameron 87'; Anderson 90+3'	Report		Stadium: Rugby Park; Attendance: 6,846; Referee: Calum Scott

29 December 2024 20	Dundee United	1–0	Aberdeen	Dundee
17:15	Holt 90+4'	Report		Stadium: Tannadice Park; Attendance: 13,581; Referee: John Beaton

2 January 2025 21	Aberdeen	1–2	Ross County	Aberdeen
15:00	Nisbet 45+11'	Report	Wright 24'; Chilvers 60'	Stadium: Pittodrie Stadium; Attendance: 17,007; Referee: David Dickinson

5 January 2025 22	Motherwell	2–0	Aberdeen	Motherwell
14:30	Wilson 34'; Maswanhise 45'	Report	Rubežić (red card) 43'	Stadium: Fir Park; Attendance: 5,308; Referee: Nick Walsh

12 January 2025 23	Aberdeen	0–0	Heart of Midlothian	Aberdeen
15:00		Report		Stadium: Pittodrie Stadium; Attendance: 17,000; Referee: Steven McLean

15 January 2025 18	Rangers	3–0	Aberdeen	Glasgow
20:00	Igamane 13'; Balogun 90+3'; Dessers 90+7'	Report		Stadium: Ibrox Stadium; Attendance: 45,887; Referee: Kevin Clancy
Note: Rescheduled due to Premier Sports Cup Final.

25 January 2025 24	Aberdeen	0–3	St Mirren	Aberdeen
15:00		Report	Olusanya 7'; Mandron 36', 78'	Stadium: Pittodrie Stadium; Attendance: 15,829; Referee: Chris Graham

1 February 2025 25	Hibernian	2–0	Aberdeen	Edinburgh
15:00	Triantis 24'; N.Cadden 48'	Report		Stadium: Easter Road; Attendance: 16,533; Referee: Don Robertson

15 February 2025 26	Dundee	1–2	Aberdeen	Dundee
15:00	Palmer-Houlden 54'	Report	Nisbet 29'; Keskinen 52'	Stadium: Dens Park; Attendance: 7,632; Referee: Grant Irvine

22 February 2025 27	Aberdeen	1–0	Kilmarnock	Aberdeen
15:00	Dabbagh 90+1'	Report		Stadium: Pittodrie Stadium; Attendance: 16,993; Referee: Nick Walsh

25 February 2025 28	Celtic	5–1	Aberdeen	Glasgow
20:00	Maeda 24', 90+2'; Jota 30'; McGregor 45'; Yang 72'	Report	Morris 90'	Stadium: Celtic Park; Attendance: 58,756; Referee: John Beaton

2 March 2025 29	Aberdeen	2–2	Dundee United	Aberdeen
15:00	Nisbet 75', 90+1'	Report	Ševelj 20'; Dalby 45+9'	Stadium: Pittodrie Stadium; Attendance: 17,862; Referee: Don Robertson

15 March 2025 30	St Johnstone	0–0	Aberdeen	Perth
15:00		Report		Stadium: McDiarmid Park; Attendance: 7,733; Referee: Chris Graham

29 March 2025 31	Aberdeen	4–1	Motherwell	Aberdeen
15:00	Dorrington 13'; Clarkson 37'; Nisbet 77', 90+2'	Report	Slattery 5'	Stadium: Pittodrie Stadium; Attendance: 19,274; Referee: Ross Hardie

5 April 2025 32	Ross County	0–1	Aberdeen	Dingwall
15:00			Morris 33'	Stadium: Victoria Park; Attendance: 5,194; Referee: Lloyd Wilson

13 April 2025 33	Aberdeen	2–2	Rangers	Aberdeen
12:00	Clarkson 31'; Guèye 44'	Report	McCausland (red card) 40'; Igamane 49'; Hagi 90+6'	Stadium: Pittodrie Stadium; Attendance: 18,863; Referee: Steven McLean
Note: Live on Sky Sports.

26 April 2025 34	Aberdeen	1–0	Hibernian	Aberdeen
15:00	Nisbet 80'	Report		Stadium: Pittodrie Stadium; Attendance: 17,396; Referee: David Dickenson

3 May 2025 35	St Mirren	1–0	Aberdeen	Paisley
15:00	Mandron 60'	Report		Stadium: St Mirren Park; Attendance: 7,587; Referee: Ross Hardie

11 May 2025 36	Rangers	4–0	Aberdeen	Glasgow
12:00	Černý 55'; Dessers 61'; Igamane 70'; Jefté 90+3'	Report		Stadium: Ibrox Stadium; Attendance: 50,343; Referee: David Dickinson

14 May 2025 37	Aberdeen	1–5	Celtic	Aberdeen
20:00	Nisbet 42'; Dorrington (red card) 78'	Report	Nawrocki 31'; Yang 45+8'; McCowan 48'; Kenny 54'; Idah 90+4'	Stadium: Pittodrie Stadium; Attendance: 17,089; Referee: Steven McLean

17 May 2025 38	Dundee United	2–1	Aberdeen	Dundee
12:30	Gallagher 56'; Dalby 63' (pen.)	Report	Okkels 15'	Stadium: Tannadice Park; Attendance: 11,490; Referee: John Beaton

=== Scottish Cup ===
18 January 2025 Fourth round	Elgin City	0–3	Aberdeen	Elgin
15:00		Report	Morris 21'; Duk 72', 90+2'	Stadium: Borough Briggs; Attendance: 4,410; Referee: Calum Scott

9 February 2025 Fifth round	Aberdeen	3–0	Dunfermline Athletic	Aberdeen
12:30	Guèye 45+1'; Jensen 50'; Nisbet 85'	Report		Stadium: Pittodrie Stadium; Attendance: 9,893; Referee: Steven McLean

8 March 2025 Quarter-finals	Aberdeen	4–1	Queen's Park	Aberdeen
12:30	Nisbet 27'; Dabbagh 28', 52'; Shinnie 45+4'	Report	Rudden 68'	Stadium: Pittodrie Stadium; Attendance: 10,705; Referee: David Dickinson

19 April 2025 Semi-finals	Heart of Midlothian	1–2 (a.e.t.)	Aberdeen	Glasgow
12:30	Shankland 28'; Steinwender (red card) 44'; Devlin (yellow card) (yellow-red card) 116'	Report	Gordon 18' (o.g.); Dabbagh 118'	Stadium: Hampden Park; Attendance: 39,836; Referee: John Beaton

24 May 2025 Final	Aberdeen	1–1 (a.e.t.) (4–3 p)	Celtic	Glasgow
15:00 BST	Schmeichel 83' (o.g.)	Report	Dorrington 39' (o.g.)	Stadium: Hampden Park; Attendance: 49,545; Referee: Don Robertson
	Penalties
	(penalty scored) Shinnie; (penalty scored) Polvara; (penalty scored) Dabbagh; (penalty scored) Palaversa		(penalty missed) McGregor; (penalty scored) Kenny; (penalty scored) McCowan; (penalty scored) Maeda; (penalty missed) Johnston

=== Scottish League Cup ===
==== Group stage ====
13 July 2024 1	Queen of the South	0–3	Aberdeen	Dumfries
17:15		Report	Sokler 6', 37'; Shinnie 23'	Stadium: Palmerston Park; Attendance: 1,200; Referee: Don Robertson

20 July 2024 2	East Kilbride	0–4	Aberdeen	East Kilbride
15:00		Report	Devlin 27'; McGrath 34'; Clarkson 54'; Morris 62'	Stadium: K-Park Training Academy; Attendance: 686; Referee: Grant Irvine

23 July 2024 3	Aberdeen	2–1	Airdrieonians	Aberdeen
19:45	Shinnie 49'; Clarkson 59'	Report	Wilson 40'	Stadium: Pittodrie Stadium; Attendance: 9,161; Referee: Chris Graham
Note: Game televised on Premier Sports

27 July 2024 4	Aberdeen	6–0	Dumbarton	Aberdeen
15:00	MacKenzie 46'; Sokler 48', 61'; Ambrose 84'; McGarry 86'; Rubežić 90+2'	Report		Stadium: Pittodrie Stadium; Attendance: 8,450; Referee: Craig Napier

==== Knockout phase ====
17 August 2024 Second round	Aberdeen	1–0	Queen's Park	Aberdeen
15:00	Keskinen 90+2'	Report		Stadium: Pittodrie Stadium; Attendance: 8,939; Referee: Colin Steven

21 September 2024 Quarter-finals	Aberdeen	4–0	The Spartans	Aberdeen
17:30	Guèye 14'; Nisbet 44'; Clarkson 46'; Sokler 72'	Report		Stadium: Pittodrie Stadium; Attendance: 11,615; Referee: Ross Hardie

2 November 2024 Semi-finals	Celtic	6–0	Aberdeen	Glasgow
17:30	Carter-Vickers 29'; Furuhashi 32'; Maeda 40', 49', 85'; Kühn 59'	Report		Stadium: Hampden Park; Attendance: 47,544; Referee: Kevin Clancy

== Squad statistics ==
=== Appearances ===
As of 24 May 2025

No.	Pos	Player	Premiership		League Cup		Scottish Cup		Total	
No.	Pos	Player	Apps	Goals	Apps	Goals	Apps	Goals	Apps	Goals
1	GK	(Bulgaria) Dimitar Mitov	24	0	6	0	3	0	33	0
2	DF	(Scotland) Nicky Devlin	26+4	4	7	1	2	0	39	5
3	DF	(Scotland) Jack MacKenzie	23+2	0	7	1	1+1	0	34	1
4	MF	(Scotland) Graeme Shinnie	31+5	1	6+1	2	3+2	1	48	4
5	DF	(Netherlands) Mats Knoester	13	0	0	0	4	0	17	0
6	MF	(Norway) Sivert Heltne Nilsen	26	0	6	0	2	0	34	0
7	MF	(Republic of Ireland) Jamie McGrath	21+4	4	7	1	0+1	0	33	5
8	MF	(United States) Dante Polvara	1+9	0	0	0	1+3	0	14	0
9	FW	(Scotland) Kevin Nisbet	20+10	11	1	1	4+1	2	36	14
10	MF	(England) Leighton Clarkson	22+11	4	5+1	3	3+2	0	44	7
11	FW	(Palestine) Oday Dabbagh	3+10	1	0	0	1+2	3	16	4
14	FW	(Senegal) Pape Habib Guèye	15+5	6	2+1	1	2+3	1	28	8
15	DF	(New Zealand) James McGarry	5+1	0	0+4	1	0	0	10	1
16	FW	(Denmark) Jeppe Okkels	12+4	1	0	0	1+1	0	18	1
17	FW	(Netherlands) Vicente Besuijen	0+11	2	1+3	0	0	0	15	2
18	MF	(Croatia) Ante Palaversa	20+10	2	1+1	0	5	0	37	2
19	FW	(Slovenia) Ester Sokler	12+9	2	6+1	5	0	0	28	7
20	FW	(England) Shayden Morris	11+26	3	5+1	1	3+2	1	48	5
21	DF	(Republic of Ireland) Gavin Molloy	19	0	7	0	0	0	26	0
22	DF	(Scotland) Jack Milne	1+8	0	1+2	0	1+2	0	15	0
24	DF	(Latvia) Kristers Tobers	10	0	0	0	2+1	0	13	0
26	DF	(England) Alfie Dorrington	8+4	1	0	0	3+1	0	16	1
28	DF	(Denmark) Alexander Jensen	13+2	0	0	0	5	1	20	1
30	MF	(Scotland) Fletcher Boyd	0+2	0	0+2	0	0+3	0	7	0
31	GK	(Scotland) Ross Doohan	14+1	0	1	0	2	0	18	0
32	FW	(Nigeria) Peter Ambrose	1+13	1	0+6	1	1+1	0	22	2
81	FW	(Finland) Topi Keskinen	32+4	5	1+2	1	4	0	43	6
Players who left the club during the season
5	DF	(Finland) Richard Jensen	0+1	0	0+1	0	0	0	2	0
9	FW	(North Macedonia) Bojan Miovski	1+1	0	0+1	0	0	0	3	0
11	FW	(Cape Verde) Duk	8+10	0	1	0	1	2	20	2
23	MF	(Scotland) Ryan Duncan	0	0	0+3	0	0	0	3	0
27	DF	(England) Angus MacDonald	4+1	0	1+1	0	0	0	7	0
33	DF	(Montenegro) Slobodan Rubežić	20	0	5	1	1	0	26	1
35	MF	(Scotland) Alfie Stewart	0	0	0	0	0	0	0	0

=== Goalscorers ===
As of 24 May 2025

Ranking	Nation	Number	Name	Scottish Premiership	Scottish Cup	League Cup	Total
1	(Scotland)	9	Kevin Nisbet	11	2	1	14
2	(Senegal)	14	Pape Habib Guèye	6	1	1	8
3	(England)	10	Leighton Clarkson	4	0	3	7
=	(Slovenia)	19	Ester Sokler	2	0	5	7
5	(Finland)	81	Topi Keskinen	5	0	1	6
6	(Scotland)	2	Nicky Devlin	4	0	1	5
=	(Republic of Ireland)	7	Jamie McGrath	4	0	1	5
=	(England)	20	Shayden Morris	3	1	1	5
9	(Scotland)	4	Graeme Shinnie	1	1	2	4
=	(Palestine)	11	Oday Dabbagh	1	3	0	4
11	(Cape Verde)	11	Duk	0	2	0	2
=	(Netherlands)	17	Vicente Besuijen	2	0	0	2
=	(Croatia)	18	Ante Palaversa	2	0	0	2
=	(Nigeria)	32	Peter Ambrose	1	0	1	2
15	(Scotland)	3	Jack MacKenzie	0	0	1	1
=	(New Zealand)	15	James McGarry	0	0	1	1
=	(Denmark)	16	Jeppe Okkels	1	0	0	1
=	(England)	26	Alfie Dorrington	1	0	0	1
=	(Denmark)	28	Alexander Jensen	0	1	0	1
=	(Montenegro)	33	Slobodan Rubežić	0	0	1	1
TOTALS				48	11	20	79

== Club statistics ==
=== Competition overview ===
Competition	First match	Last match	Record							
Competition	First match	Last match	Pld	W	D	L	GF	GA	GD	Win %
Premiership	5 August 2024	17 May 2025	38	15	8	15	48	61	−13	39.47
Scottish Cup	18 January 2025	24 May 2025	5	4	1	0	13	3	+10	80.00
League Cup	13 July 2024	2 November 2024	7	6	0	1	20	7	+13	85.71
Total			50	25	9	16	81	71	+10	50.00

Source: Competitions

=== League table ===
Pos	Team	Pld	W	D	L	GF	GA	GD	Pts	Qualification or relegation (Note: Teams play each other three times (33 matches), before the league is split into two groups (the top six and the bottom six).)
3	Hibernian	38	15	13	10	62	50	+12	58	Qualification for the Europa League second qualifying round
4	Dundee United	38	15	8	15	45	54	−9	53	Qualification for the Conference League second qualifying round
5	Aberdeen	38	15	8	15	48	61	−13	53	Qualification for the Europa League play-off round (Note: Aberdeen qualified for the Europa League play-off round as the 2024–25 Scottish Cup winners.)
6	St Mirren	38	14	8	16	53	59	−6	50	
7	Heart of Midlothian	38	15	7	16	52	47	+5	52	

Rules for classification: 1) Points; 2) Goal difference; 3) Goals scored; 4) Head-to-head points; 5) Head-to-head goal difference; 6) Play-off (only if deciding champion, UEFA competitions qualification, second stage group allocation or relegation).

=== Results by round ===
Round	1	2	3	4	5	6	7	8	9	10	11	12	13	14	15	16	17	18	19	20	21	22	23	24	25	26	27	28	29	30	31	32	33	34	35	36	37	38
Ground	A	H	H	A	H	A	H	A	H	H	H	A	A	A	H	H	H	A	A	H	A	H	A	H	A	A	H	A	H	A	H	A	H	H	A	A	H	A
Result	W	W	W	W	W	W	W	D	W	W	W	L	D	D	L	D	L	L	L	L	L	D	L	L	L	W	W	L	D	D	W	W	D	W	L	L	L	L
Position	3	2	2	2	2	2	2	2	2	2	2	2	2	2	2	2	3	3	3	4	4	4	4	4	4	3	3	3	4	4	4	4	5	4	4	4	4	5

Updated to match(es) played on 17 May 2025. Source:
A = Away; H = Home; W = Win; D = Draw; L = Loss

=== League cup table ===
Pos	Team	Pld	W	PW	PL	L	GF	GA	GD	Pts	Qualification	ABE	AIR	QOS	EKB	DUM
1	Aberdeen	4	4	0	0	0	15	1	+14	12	Qualification for the second round	—	2–1	—	—	6–0
2	Airdrieonians	4	3	0	0	1	15	5	+10	9	Qualification for the second round	—	—	2–0	8–0	—
3	Queen of the South	4	2	0	0	2	5	6	−1	6		0–3	—	—	—	2–0
4	East Kilbride	4	0	1	0	3	2	16	−14	2		0–4	—	1–3	—	—
5	Dumbarton	4	0	0	1	3	4	13	−9	1		—	3–4	—	1–1p	—

Rules for classification: 1) goal difference, 2) goals scored, 3) away goals scored, 4) matches won, 5) away matches won, 6) drawing of lots.

== Transfers ==
=== Players in ===
Date	Pos	Player	From	Fee	Ref
14 June 2024	DF	(Republic of Ireland) Gavin Molloy	(Republic of Ireland) Shelbourne	£65,000	
14 June 2024	FW	(Nigeria) Peter Ambrose	(Hungary) Újpest	Undisclosed	
19 June 2024	GK	(Bulgaria) Dimitar Mitov	(Scotland) St Johnstone	Undisclosed	
11 July 2024	MF	(Norway) Sivert Heltne Nilsen	(Norway) SK Brann	£300,000	
8 August 2024	MF	(Croatia) Ante Palaversa	(France) Troyes	Undisclosed	
12 August 2024	FW	(Finland) Topi Keskinen	(Finland) HJK Helsinki	£860,000	
9 January 2025	DF	(Latvia) Kristers Tobers	(Switzerland) Grasshopper	£700,000	
13 January 2025	DF	(Denmark) Alexander Jensen	(Sweden) Brommapojkarna	£600,000	
3 February 2025	DF	(Netherlands) Mats Knoester	(Hungary) Ferencváros	Free	

=== Players out ===
Date	Pos	Player	To	Fee	Ref
2 June 2024	FW	(Scotland) Aaron Reid	(Scotland) Airdrieonians	Free	
6 June 2024	MF	(Republic of Ireland) Jonny Hayes	Retired		
14 June 2024	DF	(Scotland) Kai Watson	(Scotland) Huntly	Free	
14 June 2024	MF	(England) Christovie Kondolo		Free	
14 June 2024	GK	(England) Reuben Smillie		Free	
20 June 2024	MF	(Scotland) Connor Barron	(Scotland) Rangers	Tribunal	
27 June 2024	DF	(Malawi) Kieran Ngwenya	(Scotland) Dunfermline Athletic	Free	
15 July 2024	DF	(Scotland) Finlay Murray	(Scotland) Cove Rangers	Free	
18 July 2024	GK	(Netherlands) Kelle Roos	(Italy) Triestina	Free	
6 August 2024	MF	(Canada) Junior Hoilett	(Scotland) Hibernian	Free	
15 August 2024	FW	(North Macedonia) Bojan Miovski	(Spain) Girona	£6,800,000	
30 August 2024	DF	(England) Jayden Richardson	(England) Boreham Wood	Free	
30 September 2024	DF	(England) Anthony Stewart	(England) Ebbsfleet United	Free	
3 February 2025	FW	(Cape Verde) Duk	(Spain) Leganés	£600,000	
3 February 2025	DF	(England) Angus MacDonald	(England) Exeter City	Free	

=== Loans in ===
Date	Pos	Name	From	Fee	Ref
24 August 2024	FW	(Scotland) Kevin Nisbet	(England) Millwall	Season Loan	
6 January 2025	MF	(Denmark) Jeppe Okkels	(England) Preston North End	End of season Loan	
13 January 2025	DF	(England) Alfie Dorrington	(England) Tottenham Hotspur	End of season Loan	
3 February 2025	FW	(Palestine) Oday Dabbagh	(Belgium) Charleroi	End of season Loan	

=== Loans out ===
Date	Pos	Name	To	Fee	Ref
16 July 2024	GK	(Scotland) Tom Ritchie	(Scotland) Bonnyrigg Rose	Season Loan	
2 August 2024	MF	(Scotland) Adam Emslie	(Scotland) Cove Rangers	Season Loan	
2 August 2024	MF	(Scotland) Findlay Marshall	(Scotland) Cove Rangers	Season Loan	
15 August 2024	DF	(Scotland) Blair McKenzie	(Scotland) Montrose	Season Loan	
19 August 2024	MF	(Scotland) Ryan Duncan	(Scotland) Queen's Park	Season Loan	
23 August 2024	DF	(Finland) Richard Jensen	(Denmark) Vejle	Season Loan	.
30 August 2024	FW	(Scotland) Alfie Bavidge	(Scotland) Ayr United	Season Loan	
28 September 2024	MF	(Scotland) Dylan Lobban	(Scotland) Cove Rangers	Season Loan	
1 November 2024	DF	(Northern Ireland) Brendan Hamilton	(Scotland) Inverurie Loco Works	End of Season Loan	
15 November 2024	FW	(Scotland) Cammy Wilson	(Scotland) Keith	End of Season Loan	
4 January 2025	FW	(Scotland) Alfie Bavidge	(Scotland) Inverness CT	End of season Loan	
4 January 2025	MF	(Scotland) Alfie Stewart	(Scotland) Inverness CT	End of season Loan	
28 January 2025	DF	(New Zealand) James McGarry	(Greece) Athens Kallithea	End of season Loan	
13 February 2025	DF	(Montenegro) Slobodan Rubežić	(Serbia) Novi Pazar	End of season Loan	

== See also ==
- List of Aberdeen F.C. seasons
