= 2023–24 Aberdeen F.C. season =

Aberdeen
2023–24 season
- Chairman: Dave Cormack
- Manager: Barry Robson (until 31 January); Neil Warnock (interim) (from 5 February until 9 March); Peter Leven (interim)
- Ground: Pittodrie Stadium; Aberdeen, Scotland (Capacity: 20,866)
- Scottish Premiership: 7th
- Scottish Cup: Semi-final
- Scottish League Cup: Runners-up
- Europa League: Play-off round
- Conference League: Group stage
- Top goalscorer: League: Bojan Miovski (16); All: Bojan Miovski (26)
- Highest home attendance: 19,237, vs. BK Häcken, Europa League, 31 August 2023
- Lowest home attendance: 10,879, vs. Kilmarnock, Scottish Cup, 9 March 2024
- Average home league attendance: 16,055
| Home colours | Away colours | Third colours |

The 2023–24 Aberdeen F.C. season was Aberdeen's 111th season in the top flight of Scottish football and the eleventh in the Scottish Premiership. Aberdeen also competed in the League Cup, the Scottish Cup and the UEFA Europa Conference League, entering the latter as debutants of the competition. Aberdeen competed in European Group Stage football for the first time since 2007.

== Summary ==
=== May ===
On 22 May, former Livingston captain Nicky Devlin joined on a free transfer. On 31 May, pre-season plans were confirmed with a training camp in Portugal, away friendlies to Highland Football League sides Turriff United and Fraserburgh, before a trip to London to play English League One side Charlton Athletic.

=== June ===
On 6 June, Ross McCrorie left for English Championship side Bristol City for an undisclosed fee. On 13 June, the club announced the departures of coach Liam Fox, first team players Marley Watkins, Connor McLennan, Dean Campbell and Matty Kennedy, and youth team players Mason Hancock, Milosz Ochmanski, Timi Fatona and Blessing Oluyemi. Pre-season was finalised with a trip to Deepdale to play English Championship side Preston North End, Chief Executive Alan Burrows confirming all friendlies were away from home due to preparations needed at Pittodrie for the season ahead. On 15 June, Leighton Clarkson, on loan last season from Liverpool, signed for an undisclosed fee which is believed to have broken the clubs transfer record. The following day, former Slovenian under-21 international Ester Sokler also signed for an undisclosed fee. Captain Graeme Shinnie joined from Wigan Athletic for a third time, signing a three-year deal. On 26 June, former manager and non-executive director Craig Brown died at the age of 82.

=== July ===
After seven years, goalkeeper Joe Lewis left the club by mutual consent. American midfielder Dante Polvara returned from his loan spell. The Dons kicked off pre-season matches with an impressive 9–0 victory at Turriff United. They continued with two more victories against fellow Highland League sides Fraserburgh and Formartine United winning 2–0 and 1–0 respectively with the latter behind closed doors. Aberdeen completed their pre-season friendlies with two away matches in England, losing 2–0 at Preston North End, followed a week later by a 3–2 win at Charlton Athletic.

=== August ===
Aberdeen started the league campaign with a 0–0 draw away at Livingston, then a 3–1 home defeat to Celtic. This was followed by a 2–2 draw away to St Mirren, where Aberdeen scored a very late equaliser, with a penalty from Bojan Miovski after 10 minutes of injury time. Aberdeen progressed to the quarter-final of League Cup with a 2–1 victory at Stirling Albion, but dropped down into the Europa Conference League following an aggregate loss of 5–3 to BK Häcken. The club signed four new players, James McGarry, Jamie McGrath, Richard Jensen and Pape Habib Guèye but lost Ylber Ramadani who moved to Italian club Lecce for a reported £1.1 million.

=== September ===
Following the defeat to BK Häcken in the Europa League playoff round, Aberdeen were drawn in Group G of the Europa Conference League, along with Eintracht Frankfurt, PAOK and HJK Helsinki. Aberdeen's poor run of form in the league continued with two 2–0 defeats at home to Hibernian, then away to Heart of Midlothian. Aberdeen then travelled to Germany, and took a travelling support of over 2,500 to the Deutsche Bank Arena to see Aberdeen go down to a 2–1 defeat in the Europa Conference to Eintracht Frankfurt, in which Dante Polvara scored his first goal for the club. Aberdeen returned to Pittodrie three days later, and had their first league victory of the season, a 4–0 win over Ross County in which Jamie McGrath scored his first goal for the club. Aberdeen ended the month with a 3–1 victory over Rangers at Ibrox, in a match that saw Stefan Gartenmann's first goal for the club, as well as goals from Jamie McGrath and Jack Mackenzie. This was the first time Aberdeen had scored three goals at Ibrox since the 1997–98 season.

=== October ===
On 1 October, the death was announced of former Aberdeen striker Frank McDougall, at the age of 65. The Dons drew 1–1 with HJK in the Conference League with Miovski scoring which was followed up with a 0–0 draw against St Johnstone. The International break seen Slobodan Rubežić called up to the Montenegro national team for the first time. The SPFL and Police Scotland called off the Dundee match due to Storm Babet with the club confirming part of the stadium was damaged due to wind and flooding.

=== November ===
Aberdeen were eliminated from the Europa Conference League despite Jamie McGrath's sensational free-kick snatching a point against PAOK. They also reached the League Cup final thanks to a goal from Miovski at Hampden Park against Hibernian. But Celtic then dismantled a dismal Aberdeen 6–0 in the Scottish Premiership in Glasgow.

=== December ===
The winless run in the League continued with back to back defeats to Hibernian and Kilmarnock but a come from behind win at home Hearts stopped the rot. Aberdeen finished their European campaign with a 2–0 home win against Eintracht Frankfurt but days later they lost the League Cup Final at Hampden Park to Rangers thanks to a single goal from James Tavernier. The League match away to Dundee was controversially called off less than an hour before kick off. The home league match against Motherwell was postponed because of adverse weather conditions due to Storm Gerrit. They ended the year with a very unhappy Pittodrie crowd, a 3–0 loss to St Mirren.

=== January ===
The Dons began the year with a comfortable 3–0 away win at Ross County. Rhys Williams was recalled to Liverpool and Or Dadia to Hapoel Be'er Sheva with both players not making a single competitive appearance for the club. Vicente Besuijen was allowed to leave on loan with many youngsters. The clubs only January signing was Killian Phillips, a loan deal from Crystal Palace. However, following a poor run of results with the club lying in eighth place, they parted company with manager Barry Robson on 31 January.

=== February ===
Peter Leven was put on interim charge for the home match against Celtic which ended with a competitive 1–1 draw. The club appointed Neil Warnock on an interim basis until the end of the season. His first match in charge was a 2–1 loss at Rangers. This was followed up with a 2–0 win at home to League Two side Bonnyrigg Rose in the Scottish Cup. Warnock admitted it was his aim to win a cup as he had never done before in his managerial career. This was followed with a remarkable 3–3 home draw with Motherwell. It was the first time since 1951 the Dons had come from 3–0 down in a match. Warnock signed up Junior Hoilett as he had worked with him three times before and felt he could offer a benefit to the squad. Another draw followed, 2–2 at home to Hibernian with the Dons now hoping for a top-six finish but still languishing in eighth.

=== March ===
Warnock left Aberdeen on 9 March, following a 3–1 win against Kilmarnock in the quarter-finals of the Scottish Cup. Following Warnock's departure, Aberdeen chairman Dave Cormack said that the club were at an "advanced stage" of finding a longer-term appointment. Assistant coach Peter Leven was put in interim charge until the end of the season.

=== April ===
After a 0–0 home draw with Dundee which seen the visitors secure top six, Aberdeen lost their Scottish Cup semi-final to Celtic in an enthralling game at Hampden Park which finished in a 3–3 draw, losing out on penalties.

=== May ===
Aberdeen's youth side were crowned Under-18 league champions and qualified for the UEFA Youth League. 16-year-old Fletcher Boyd scored on his debut in the 4–0 hammering of Hibernian. The club finished as 'best of the rest' in seventh place, having gone unbeaten since the league's split.

== Results & fixtures ==
Win Draw Loss Postponed

=== Pre-season ===
| 12 July 2023 Friendly | Turriff United | 0–9 | Aberdeen | Turriff |
| 19:45 | | | Marshall 27'; Clarkson 31'; Ramadani 44'; Duk 52'; Sokler 64', 67' (pen.), 80', 84'; Morris 85' | Stadium: The Haughs; Attendance: 2,000; Referee: Joel Kennedy |

| 15 July 2023 Friendly | Fraserburgh | 0–2 | Aberdeen | Fraserburgh |
| 15:00 | | | Bavidge 38'; Sokler 52' (pen.) | Stadium: Bellslea Park; Attendance: 1,865; Referee: Joel Kennedy |
Note: Ryan Cowie Testimonial

| 22 July 2023 Friendly | Preston North End | 2–0 | Aberdeen | Preston, England |
| 15:00 | Frøkjær 7', 18' | Report | | Stadium: Deepdale; Attendance: 4,271 |

| 29 July 2023 Friendly | Charlton Athletic | 2–3 | Aberdeen | London, England |
| 13:00 | Blackett-Taylor 70'; Devlin 90' (o.g.) | Report | Asiimwe 3' (o.g.); Shinnie 22'; Miovski 33' | Stadium: The Valley; Attendance: 3,472 |

=== Scottish Premiership ===
| 5 August 2023 1 | Livingston | 0–0 | Aberdeen | Livingston |
| 15:00 | | Report | | Stadium: Tony Macaroni Arena; Attendance: 5,630; Referee: John Beaton |

| 13 August 2023 2 | Aberdeen | 1–3 | Celtic | Aberdeen |
| 12:00 | Miovski 25' | Report | Abada 11'; Kyogo 29'; O'Riley 84' | Stadium: Pittodrie; Attendance: 18,652; Referee: Kevin Clancy |
Note: Game televised on Sky Sports.

| 27 August 2023 3 | St Mirren | 2–2 | Aberdeen | Paisley |
| 15:00 | Kiltie 59' (pen.); Greive 76' | Report | Hayes 42'; Miovski 90+10' (pen.) | Stadium: St Mirren Park; Attendance: 7,492; Referee: John Beaton |

| 3 September 2023 4 | Aberdeen | 0–2 | Hibernian | Aberdeen |
| 15:00 | Rubežić (yellow card) 26'; Shinnie (yellow card) 71' | Report | Jeggo (yellow card) 17'; Campbell (yellow card) 32'; Hanlon (yellow card) 51'; Le Fondre 75'; Doidge 81'; Newell (yellow card) 85' | Stadium: Pittodrie; Attendance: 16,471; Referee: David Munro |

| 16 September 2023 5 | Heart of Midlothian | 2–0 | Aberdeen | Edinburgh |
| 15:00 | Oda 14'; Boyce 64' | Report | | Stadium: Tynecastle; Attendance: 18,626; Referee: Kevin Clancy |

| 24 September 2023 6 | Aberdeen | 4–0 | Ross County | Aberdeen |
| 15:00 | Miovski 21', 52'; Duk 42'; McGrath 47' | Report | | Stadium: Pittodrie; Attendance: 15,116; Referee: Don Robertson |

| 30 September 2023 7 | Rangers | 1–3 | Aberdeen | Glasgow |
| 15:00 | Wright (red card) 71'; Sima 75' | Report | Gartenmann 38'; McGrath 68'; MacKenzie 85' | Stadium: Ibrox; Attendance: 49,959; Referee: Steven McLean |

| 8 October 2023 8 | Aberdeen | 0–0 | St Johnstone | Aberdeen |
| 15:00 | | Report | | Stadium: Pittodrie; Attendance: 16,816; Referee: David Munro |

| 29 October 2023 10 | Kilmarnock | 2–0 | Aberdeen | Kilmarnock |
| 12:00 | Vassell 45+4'; Watkins 64' | Report | | Stadium: Rugby Park; Attendance: 5,480; Referee: Kevin Clancy |
Note: Game televised on Sky Sports Football.

| 1 November 2023 11 | Motherwell | 2–4 | Aberdeen | Motherwell |
| 19:45 | Bair 78'; Biereth 90+3' | Report | McGrath 26', 68'; Devlin 44'; Duk 74' | Stadium: Fir Park; Attendance: 4,240; Referee: Colin Steven |

| 12 November 2023 13 | Celtic | 6–0 | Aberdeen | Glasgow |
| 15:00 | Yang 9'; Furuhashi 16'; Palma 77' (pen.); Turnbull 90+2'; Oh 90+6', 90+9' | Report | | Stadium: Celtic Park; Referee: William Collum |

| 26 November 2023 14 | Aberdeen | 1–1 | Rangers | Aberdeen |
| 12:00 | Miovski 11' | Report | Tavernier 90+4' (pen.) | Stadium: Pittodrie; Attendance: 16,911; Referee: Nick Walsh |

| 3 December 2023 15 | Hibernian | 2–0 | Aberdeen | Edinburgh |
| 15:00 | Vente 18'; Fish 70' | Report | | Stadium: Easter Road; Attendance: 16,592; Referee: William Collum |

| 6 December 2023 16 | Aberdeen | 0–1 | Kilmarnock | Aberdeen |
| 19:45 | | Report | Watson 90+2' | Stadium: Pittodrie; Attendance: 13,668; Referee: Matthew MacDermid |

| 9 December 2023 17 | Aberdeen | 2–1 | Heart of Midlothian | Aberdeen |
| 15:00 | Miovski 53'; Clarkson 90+2' | Report | Shankland 20' | Stadium: Pittodrie; Attendance: 16,064; Referee: Chris Graham |

| 20 December 2023 12 | Aberdeen | 2–1 | Livingston | Aberdeen |
| 19:45 | Miovski 42', 65' | Report | Guthrie 28' | Stadium: Pittodrie; Attendance: 13,794; Referee: Nick Walsh |
Note: Re-arranged match due to League Cup.

| 30 December 2023 21 | Aberdeen | 0–3 | St Mirren | Aberdeen |
| 15:00 | | Report | O'Hara 12'; Ayunga 78'; Kiltie 90+3' (pen.) | Stadium: Pittodrie; Attendance: 17,029; Referee: Grant Irvine |

| 2 January 2024 22 | Ross County | 0–3 | Aberdeen | Dingwall |
| 15:00 | | Report | McGrath 24', 30'; Miovski 80' | Stadium: Victoria Park; Attendance: 5,791; Referee: Matthew MacDermid |

| 24 January 2024 18 | St Johnstone | 1–1 | Aberdeen | Perth |
| 19:45 | Keltjens 78' | Report | Miovski 62' (pen.) | Stadium: McDiarmid Park; Attendance: 3,472; Referee: John Beaton |
Note: Rearranged match after postponement due to the League Cup.

| 27 January 2024 23 | Heart of Midlothian | 2–0 | Aberdeen | Edinburgh |
| 15:00 | Grant 57' (pen.); Shankland 77' | Report | | Stadium: Tynecastle; Attendance: 18,790; Referee: Kevin Clancy |

| 30 January 2024 9 | Aberdeen | 1–1 | Dundee | Aberdeen |
| 19:45 | Miovski 31' (pen.) | Report | Ashcroft 55' | Stadium: Pittodrie; Attendance: 15,512; Referee: Nick Walsh |
Note: Rearranged match after postponement

| 3 February 2024 24 | Aberdeen | 1–1 | Celtic | Aberdeen |
| 12:30 | Miovski 50' | Report | Kühn 63' | Stadium: Pittodrie; Referee: Steven McLean |
Note: Game televised on Sky Sports.

| 7 February 2024 25 | Rangers | 2–1 | Aberdeen | Glasgow |
| 20:00 | Matondo 7'; Cantwell 72'; Sterling (red card) 88' | Report | Miovski 45' | Stadium: Ibrox; Attendance: 49,329; Referee: Don Robertson |
Note: Game televised on Sky Sports.

| 14 February 2024 20 | Aberdeen | 3–3 | Motherwell | Aberdeen |
| 19:45 | Duk 31', 50'; Gartenmann 37' | Report | Bair 5' (pen.), 22'; Devine 26' | Stadium: Pittodrie; Attendance: 15,290; Referee: Kevin Clancy |
Note: Rearranged match after postponement

| 17 February 2024 26 | Aberdeen | 2–2 | Hibernian | Aberdeen |
| 15:00 | Devlin 15'; McGrath 51' | Report | Boyle 12'; Marcondes 67' | Stadium: Pittodrie; Attendance: 18,329; Referee: David Munro |

| 24 February 2024 27 | Kilmarnock | 2–0 | Aberdeen | Kilmarnock |
| 15:00 | Ndaba 45+5'; Kennedy 58' | Report | | Stadium: Rugby Park; Attendance: 6,230; Referee: Graham Grainger |

| 28 February 2024 28 | Aberdeen | 0–2 | St Johnstone | Aberdeen |
| 19:45 | | Report | Clark 44' (pen.); Kimpioka 77' | Stadium: Pittodrie; Attendance: 14,226; Referee: Don Robertson |

| 2 March 2024 29 | St Mirren | 2–1 | Aberdeen | Paisley |
| 15:00 | O'Hara 90+6' (pen.); Olusanya 90+7' | Report | Barron 1' | Stadium: St Mirren Park; Attendance: 7,019; Referee: Nick Walsh |

| 13 March 2024 19 | Dundee | 1–0 | Aberdeen | Dundee |
| 19:45 | McCowan 66' (pen.) | Report | | Stadium: Dens Park; Attendance: 8,215; Referee: Steven McLean |
Note: Rearranged match after postponement

| 16 March 2024 30 | Motherwell | 0–1 | Aberdeen | Motherwell |
| 15:00 | | Report | Clarkson 25' | Stadium: Fir Park; Referee: William Collum |

| 30 March 2024 31 | Aberdeen | 2–1 | Ross County | Aberdeen |
| 15:00 | Miovski 5'; McGrath 78' | Report | Murray 26' | Stadium: Pittodrie; Attendance: 17,616; Referee: Kevin Clancy |

| 6 April 2024 32 | Livingston | 0–0 | Aberdeen | Livingston |
| 15:00 | | Report | | Stadium: Tony Macaroni Arena; Attendance: 2,797; Referee: Graham Grainger |

| 13 April 2024 33 | Aberdeen | 0–0 | Dundee | Aberdeen |
| 15:00 | Shinnie (red card) 90+6' | Report | | Stadium: Pittodrie; Attendance: 17,176; Referee: Nick Walsh |

| 27 April 2024 34 | Aberdeen | 1–0 | Motherwell | Aberdeen |
| 15:00 | Gartenmann 60' | Report | | Stadium: Pittodrie; Attendance: 14,794; Referee: Craig Napier |

| 4 May 2024 35 | Aberdeen | 1–0 | St Johnstone | Aberdeen |
| 15:00 | Miovski 68' (pen.) | Report | | Stadium: Pittodrie; Attendance: 15,537; Referee: Chris Graham |

| 12 May 2024 36 | Hibernian | 0–4 | Aberdeen | Edinburgh |
| 15:00 | | Report | Clarkson 30'; Polvara 39'; Miovski 52'; Boyd 90+2' | Stadium: Easter Road; Attendance: 16,044; Referee: Grant Irvine |

| 15 May 2024 37 | Aberdeen | 5–1 | Livingston | Aberdeen |
| 19:45 | Hoilett 58', 81'; Shinnie 74'; Polvara 77'; Boyd 90+3' | Report | Yengi 52' (pen.) | Stadium: Pittodrie; Attendance: 15,043; Referee: Alan Muir |

| 19 May 2024 38 | Ross County | 2–2 | Aberdeen | Dingwall |
| 15:00 | Murray 5'; Dhanda 68' (pen.) | Report | Sokler 32'; McGrath 50'; MacDonald (red card) 64' | Stadium: Victoria Park; Attendance: 6,119; Referee: Chris Graham |

=== Scottish League Cup ===
Having qualified for Europe, Aberdeen entered the Scottish League Cup at the knockout phase. They lost in the Final to Rangers.

==== Knockout phase ====
| 18 August 2023 Second round | Stirling Albion | 1–2 | Aberdeen | Stirling |
| 19:45 | Spence 75' | Report | Miovski 29'; Clarkson 63' | Stadium: Forthbank Stadium; Attendance: 2,943; Referee: David Munro |

| 27 September 2023 Quarter-final | Ross County | 1–2 | Aberdeen | Dingwall |
| 19:45 | Baldwin (red card) 14'; Turner 83' (pen.) | Report | Shinnie 8'; Sokler 80' | Stadium: Victoria Park; Attendance: 4,637; Referee: John Beaton |

| 4 November 2023 Semi-final | Hibernian | 0–1 | Aberdeen | Glasgow |
| 17:15 | | Report | MacKenzie (red card) 75'; Miovski 78' | Stadium: Hampden Park; Attendance: 28,295; Referee: John Beaton |

| 17 December 2023 Final | Rangers | 1–0 | Aberdeen | Glasgow |
| 15:00 | Tavernier 76' | Report | | Stadium: Hampden Park; Attendance: 49,296; Referee: Don Robertson |

=== Scottish Cup ===
| 19 January 2024 Fourth round | Clyde | 0–2 | Aberdeen | Hamilton |
| 19:45 | | Report | Miovski 32'; Devlin 57' | Stadium: New Douglas Park; Attendance: 2,601; Referee: Euan Anderson |
Note: Game televised on BBC Scotland.

| 10 February 2024 Fifth round | Aberdeen | 2–0 | Bonnyrigg Rose | Aberdeen |
| 15:00 | Miovski 17', 25' | Report | | Stadium: Pittodrie Stadium; Attendance: 11,470; Referee: Matthew MacDermid |

| 9 March 2024 Quarter-final | Aberdeen | 3–1 | Kilmarnock | Aberdeen |
| 12:15 | McGrath 11'; Shinnie 33'; Findlay 66' (o.g.) | Report | Armstrong 41' | Stadium: Pittodrie Stadium; Attendance: 10,879; Referee: John Beaton |

| 20 April 2024 Semi-final | Aberdeen | 3–3 (a.e.t.) (5–6 p) | Celtic | Glasgow |
| 12:30 | Miovski 2'; Sokler 90'; MacDonald 119' | Report | Kühn 21'; Forrest 63'; O'Riley 105+1' | Stadium: Hampden Park; Attendance: 45,385; Referee: Don Robertson |

=== UEFA Europa League ===
Aberdeen returned to European football in the Play-off round for the Europa League. They were guaranteed European Group Stage football for the first time since 2008. They were knocked out of the UEFA Europa Conference League placing third in Group G.

==== Play-off round ====
| 24 August 2023 First leg | BK Häcken (Sweden) | 2–2 | (Scotland) Aberdeen | Gothenburg, Sweden |
| 18:00 | Layouni 36'; Sadiq 69' (pen.) | Report | Miovski 75'; Devlin 79' | Stadium: Bravida Arena; Attendance: 4,424; Referee: Filip Glova |

| 31 August 2023 Second leg | Aberdeen (Scotland) | 1–3 (3–5 agg.) | (Sweden) BK Häcken | Aberdeen |
| 19:45 | Miovski 55' (pen.) | Report | Sadiq 14', 41', 81' (pen.) | Stadium: Pittodrie; Attendance: 19,237; Referee: Daniel Siebert |

=== UEFA Europa Conference League ===
==== Group Stages ====
| 21 September 2023 1 | Eintracht Frankfurt (Germany) | 2–1 | (Scotland) Aberdeen | Frankfurt, Germany |
| 18:45 | Marmoush 11' (pen.); Koch 61' | Report | Polvara 22' | Stadium: Waldstadion; Attendance: 55,500; Referee: Chrysovalantis Theouli |

| 5 October 2023 2 | Aberdeen (Scotland) | 1–1 | (Finland) HJK | Aberdeen |
| 20:00 | Miovski 79' | Report | Radulović 59' | Stadium: Pittodrie; Attendance: 16,316; Referee: Daniel Stefanski |

| 26 October 2023 3 | Aberdeen (Scotland) | 2–3 | (Greece) PAOK | Aberdeen |
| 20:00 | Miovski 50'; Polvara 58' | Report | Despodov 73'; Vieirinha 84'; Schwab 90+6' (pen.) | Stadium: Pittodrie; Attendance: 16,089; Referee: Sebastian Gishamer |

| 9 November 2023 4 | PAOK (Greece) | 2–2 | (Scotland) Aberdeen | Thessaloniki, Greece |
| 18:45 | Taison 23'; Samatta 67' | Report | Duk 14'; McGrath 70' | Stadium: Toumba Stadium; Referee: Juxhin Xhaja |

| 30 November 2023 5 | HJK (Finland) | 2–2 | (Scotland) Aberdeen | Helsinki, Finland |
| 18:45 | Bandé 16'; Hostikka 33' | Report | MacDonald 41'; Duk 56' | Stadium: Bolt Arena; Attendance: 9,053; Referee: Genc Nuza |

| 14 December 2023 6 | Aberdeen (Scotland) | 2–0 | (Germany) Eintracht Frankfurt | Aberdeen |
| 18:45 | Duk 41'; Sokler 74' | Report | | Stadium: Pittodrie; Attendance: 14,474; Referee: Miguel Bértolo Nogueira |

== Squad statistics ==
=== Appearances ===
As of 19 May 2024

| No. | Pos | Player | Premiership | | Europe | | League Cup | | Scottish Cup | | Total | |
| No. | Pos | Player | Apps | Goals | Apps | Goals | Apps | Goals | Apps | Goals | Apps | Goals |
|---|---|---|---|---|---|---|---|---|---|---|---|---|
| 2 | DF | (Scotland) Nicky Devlin | 37 | 2 | 6+2 | 1 | 4 | 0 | 4 | 1 | 53 | 4 |
| 3 | DF | (Scotland) Jack MacKenzie | 25+2 | 1 | 5 | 0 | 2 | 0 | 4 | 0 | 38 | 1 |
| 4 | MF | (Scotland) Graeme Shinnie (c) | 35+2 | 1 | 6 | 0 | 4 | 1 | 3 | 1 | 50 | 3 |
| 5 | DF | (Finland) Richard Jensen | 24+4 | 0 | 6+1 | 0 | 3 | 0 | 1 | 0 | 39 | 0 |
| 6 | DF | (Denmark) Stefan Gartenmann | 32 | 3 | 5 | 0 | 3 | 0 | 3+1 | 0 | 44 | 3 |
| 7 | MF | (Republic of Ireland) Jamie McGrath | 31+3 | 9 | 5+3 | 1 | 3 | 0 | 3 | 1 | 48 | 11 |
| 8 | MF | (Scotland) Connor Barron | 23+5 | 1 | 4+2 | 0 | 2+1 | 0 | 3+1 | 0 | 41 | 1 |
| 9 | FW | (North Macedonia) Bojan Miovski | 36+2 | 16 | 5+2 | 4 | 4 | 2 | 4 | 4 | 53 | 26 |
| 10 | MF | (England) Leighton Clarkson | 29+7 | 3 | 4+1 | 0 | 3+1 | 1 | 3+1 | 0 | 49 | 4 |
| 11 | FW | (Cape Verde) Duk | 16+18 | 4 | 6+2 | 3 | 2+1 | 0 | 2+2 | 0 | 49 | 7 |
| 15 | DF | (New Zealand) James McGarry | 7+6 | 0 | 2+1 | 0 | 0+1 | 0 | 0 | 0 | 17 | 0 |
| 17 | MF | (Republic of Ireland) Jonny Hayes | 8+6 | 1 | 1+6 | 0 | 2 | 0 | 0 | 0 | 23 | 1 |
| 18 | MF | (Republic of Ireland) Killian Phillips | 3+7 | 0 | 0 | 0 | 0 | 0 | 1+2 | 0 | 13 | 0 |
| 19 | FW | (Slovenia) Ester Sokler | 6+20 | 1 | 0+7 | 1 | 1+3 | 1 | 0+3 | 1 | 40 | 4 |
| 20 | FW | (England) Shayden Morris | 3+9 | 0 | 3 | 0 | 1+1 | 0 | 1+2 | 0 | 20 | 0 |
| 21 | MF | (United States) Dante Polvara | 17+11 | 2 | 5+1 | 2 | 1+2 | 0 | 3 | 0 | 40 | 4 |
| 23 | MF | (Scotland) Ryan Duncan | 2+7 | 0 | 4+2 | 0 | 1+1 | 0 | 0+2 | 0 | 19 | 0 |
| 24 | GK | (Netherlands) Kelle Roos | 37 | 0 | 8 | 0 | 4 | 0 | 3 | 0 | 52 | 0 |
| 27 | DF | (England) Angus MacDonald | 13+6 | 0 | 2+1 | 1 | 0+1 | 0 | 3 | 1 | 26 | 2 |
| 28 | DF | (Scotland) Jack Milne | 3+3 | 0 | 2 | 0 | 0 | 0 | 0+2 | 0 | 10 | 0 |
| 30 | MF | (Canada) Junior Hoilett | 10+3 | 2 | 0 | 0 | 0 | 0 | 1+1 | 0 | 15 | 2 |
| 31 | GK | (Scotland) Ross Doohan | 1 | 0 | 0 | 0 | 0 | 0 | 1 | 0 | 2 | 0 |
| 33 | DF | (Montenegro) Slobodan Rubežić | 16+2 | 0 | 8 | 0 | 4 | 0 | 1 | 0 | 31 | 0 |
| 49 | FW | (Scotland) Fletcher Boyd | 0+2 | 2 | 0 | 0 | 0 | 0 | 0 | 0 | 2 | 2 |
Players who left the club during the season
| 14 | FW | (Senegal) Pape Habib Guèye | 0+4 | 0 | 1 | 0 | 0+1 | 0 | 0+1 | 0 | 7 | 0 |
| 18 | DF | (England) Rhys Williams | 0 | 0 | 0 | 0 | 0 | 0 | 0 | 0 | 0 | 0 |
| 22 | FW | (Netherlands) Vicente Besuijen | 0 | 0 | 0 | 0 | 0 | 0 | 0 | 0 | 0 | 0 |
| 25 | GK | (Scotland) Tom Ritchie | 0 | 0 | 0 | 0 | 0 | 0 | 0 | 0 | 0 | 0 |
| 26 | DF | (England) Anthony Stewart | 0 | 0 | 0 | 0 | 0 | 0 | 0 | 0 | 0 | 0 |
| 30 | DF | (Israel) Or Dadia | 0 | 0 | 0 | 0 | 0 | 0 | 0 | 0 | 0 | 0 |
| 32 | MF | (Scotland) Findlay Marshall | 0 | 0 | 0 | 0 | 0 | 0 | 0 | 0 | 0 | 0 |
| 36 | FW | (Scotland) Alfie Bavidge | 0 | 0 | 0 | 0 | 0 | 0 | 0 | 0 | 0 | 0 |
| 55 | DF | (Malawi) Kieran Ngwenya | 0 | 0 | 0 | 0 | 0 | 0 | 0 | 0 | 0 | 0 |

=== Goalscorers ===
As of 19 May 2024

| Ranking | Nation | Number | Name | Scottish Premiership | Europe | League Cup | Scottish Cup | Total |
|---|---|---|---|---|---|---|---|---|
| 1 | (North Macedonia) | 9 | Bojan Miovski | 16 | 4 | 2 | 4 | 26 |
| 2 | (Republic of Ireland) | 7 | Jamie McGrath | 9 | 1 | 0 | 1 | 11 |
| 3 | (Cape Verde) | 11 | Duk | 4 | 3 | 0 | 0 | 7 |
| 4 | (Scotland) | 2 | Nicky Devlin | 2 | 1 | 0 | 1 | 4 |
| = | (England) | 10 | Leighton Clarkson | 3 | 0 | 1 | 0 | 4 |
| = | (Slovenia) | 19 | Ester Sokler | 1 | 1 | 1 | 1 | 4 |
| = | (United States) | 21 | Dante Polvara | 2 | 2 | 0 | 0 | 4 |
| 8 | (Scotland) | 4 | Graeme Shinnie | 1 | 0 | 1 | 1 | 3 |
| = | (Denmark) | 6 | Stefan Gartenmann | 3 | 0 | 0 | 0 | 3 |
| 10 | (England) | 27 | Angus MacDonald | 0 | 1 | 0 | 1 | 2 |
| = | (Canada) | 30 | Junior Hoilett | 2 | 0 | 0 | 0 | 2 |
| = | (Scotland) | 49 | Fletcher Boyd | 2 | 0 | 0 | 0 | 2 |
| 13 | (Scotland) | 3 | Jack MacKenzie | 1 | 0 | 0 | 0 | 1 |
| = | (Scotland) | 8 | Connor Barron | 1 | 0 | 0 | 0 | 1 |
| = | (Republic of Ireland) | 17 | Jonny Hayes | 1 | 0 | 0 | 0 | 1 |
| TOTALS | | | | 48 | 13 | 5 | 9 | 75 |

== Team statistics ==
=== Overall record ===
| Competition | First match | Last match | Starting round | Final position | Record | | | | | | | |
| Competition | First match | Last match | Starting round | Final position | Pld | W | D | L | GF | GA | GD | Win % |
|---|---|---|---|---|---|---|---|---|---|---|---|---|
| Scottish Premiership | 5 August 2023 | 19 May 2024 | Matchday 1 | Seventh place | 38 | 12 | 12 | 14 | 48 | 52 | −4 | 31.58 |
| Scottish Cup | 19 January 2024 | 20 April 2024 | Fourth round | Semi-final | 4 | 3 | 1 | 0 | 10 | 4 | +6 | 75.00 |
| Scottish League Cup | 18 August 2023 | 17 December 2023 | Second round | Runners-up | 4 | 3 | 0 | 1 | 5 | 3 | +2 | 75.00 |
| Scottish Challenge Cup | 2 August 2023 | 15 August 2023 | First round | Second round | 2 | 0 | 1 | 1 | 4 | 6 | −2 | 0.00 |
| UEFA Europa League | 24 August 2023 | 31 August 2023 | Play–off round | Play–off round | 2 | 0 | 1 | 1 | 3 | 5 | −2 | 0.00 |
| UEFA Europa Conference League | 21 September 2023 | 14 December 2023 | Group stage | Group stage | 6 | 1 | 3 | 2 | 10 | 10 | +0 | 16.67 |
| Total | | | | | 56 | 19 | 18 | 19 | 80 | 80 | +0 | 33.93 |

Source: Results & fixtures

=== League table ===
| Pos | Team | Pld | W | D | L | GF | GA | GD | Pts | Qualification or relegation (Note: Teams play each other three times (33 matches), before the league is split into two groups (the top six and the bottom six).) |
|---|---|---|---|---|---|---|---|---|---|---|
| 5 | St Mirren | 38 | 13 | 8 | 17 | 46 | 52 | −6 | 47 | Qualification for the Conference League second qualifying round |
| 6 | Dundee | 38 | 10 | 12 | 16 | 49 | 68 | −19 | 42 | |
| 7 | Aberdeen | 38 | 12 | 12 | 14 | 48 | 52 | −4 | 48 | |
| 8 | Hibernian | 38 | 11 | 13 | 14 | 52 | 59 | −7 | 46 | |
| 9 | Motherwell | 38 | 10 | 13 | 15 | 56 | 59 | −3 | 43 | |

Rules for classification: 1) Points; 2) Goal difference; 3) Goals scored; 4) Head-to-Head points; 5) Head-to-Head goal difference; 6) Play-off (only if deciding champion, UEFA competitions qualification, second stage group allocation or relegation).

=== Results by round ===
| Round | 1 | 2 | 3 | 4 | 5 | 6 | 7 | 8 | 9 | 10 | 11 | 12 | 13 | 14 | 15 | 16 | 17 | 18 | 19 | 20 | 21 | 22 | 23 | 24 | 25 | 26 | 27 | 28 | 29 | 30 | 31 | 32 | 33 | 34 | 35 | 36 | 37 | 38 |
|---|---|---|---|---|---|---|---|---|---|---|---|---|---|---|---|---|---|---|---|---|---|---|---|---|---|---|---|---|---|---|---|---|---|---|---|---|---|---|
| Ground | A | H | A | H | A | H | A | H | A | A | A | H | A | H | H | H | H | A | A | A | H | H | A | H | H | A | H | A | A | A | H | A | H | H | H | A | H | A |
| Result | D | L | D | L | L | W | W | D | L | W | L | D | L | L | W | W | L | W | D | L | D | D | L | D | D | L | L | L | L | W | W | D | D | W | W | W | W | D |
| Position | 7 | 9 | 10 | 11 | 11 | 11 | 7 | 8 | 10 | 6 | 9 | 9 | 10 | 11 | 9 | 8 | 9 | 8 | 7 | 8 | 8 | 8 | 9 | 9 | 8 | 8 | 9 | 10 | 10 | 9 | 9 | 9 | 9 | 8 | 8 | 7 | 7 | 7 |

Updated to match(es) played on 19 May 2024. Source:
A = Away; H = Home; W = Win; D = Draw; L = Loss

=== Conference League table ===
| Pos | Team | Pld | W | D | L | GF | GA | GD | Pts | Qualification | PAOK | FRA | ABE | HJK |
|---|---|---|---|---|---|---|---|---|---|---|---|---|---|---|
| 1 | (Greece) PAOK | 6 | 5 | 1 | 0 | 16 | 10 | +6 | 16 | Advance to round of 16 | — | 2–1 | 2–2 | 4–2 |
| 2 | (Germany) Eintracht Frankfurt | 6 | 3 | 0 | 3 | 11 | 7 | +4 | 9 | Advance to knockout round play-offs | 1–2 | — | 2–1 | 6–0 |
| 3 | (Scotland) Aberdeen | 6 | 1 | 3 | 2 | 10 | 10 | 0 | 6 | | 2–3 | 2–0 | — | 1–1 |
| 4 | (Finland) HJK | 6 | 0 | 2 | 4 | 7 | 17 | −10 | 2 | | 2–3 | 0–1 | 2–2 | — |

Source: UEFA
Rules for classification: Group stage tiebreakers

== Transfers ==
=== Players in ===
| Date | Pos | Player | From | Fee | Ref |
|---|---|---|---|---|---|
| 22 May 2023 | DF | (Scotland) Nicky Devlin | (Scotland) Livingston | Free | |
| 15 June 2023 | MF | (England) Leighton Clarkson | (England) Liverpool | Undisclosed | |
| 16 June 2023 | FW | (Slovenia) Ester Sokler | (Slovenia) Radomlje | £300,000 | |
| 28 June 2023 | MF | (Scotland) Graeme Shinnie | (England) Wigan Athletic | Undisclosed | |
| 6 July 2023 | GK | (Scotland) Ross Doohan | (England) Forest Green Rovers | Undisclosed | |
| 31 July 2023 | DF | (Montenegro) Slobodan Rubežić | (Serbia) Novi Pazar | £190,000 | |
| 11 August 2023 | DF | (New Zealand) James McGarry | (Australia) Central Coast Mariners | Undisclosed | |
| 22 August 2023 | MF | (Republic of Ireland) Jamie McGrath | (England) Wigan Athletic | Free | |
| 23 August 2023 | DF | (Finland) Richard Jensen | (Poland) Górnik Zabrze | £500,000 | |
| 29 August 2023 | FW | (Senegal) Pape Habib Guèye | (Belgium) K.V. Kortrijk | Undisclosed | |
| 16 February 2024 | MF | (Canada) Junior Hoilett | (Canada) Vancouver Whitecaps | Free | |

=== Players out ===
| Date | Pos | Player | To | Fee | Ref |
|---|---|---|---|---|---|
| 6 June 2023 | DF | (Scotland) Ross McCrorie | (England) Bristol City | Undisclosed | |
| 14 June 2023 | FW | (Wales) Marley Watkins | (Scotland) Kilmarnock | Free | |
| 14 June 2023 | FW | (Scotland) Connor McLennan | (England) Salford City | Free | |
| 14 June 2023 | DF | (England) Mason Hancock | (Scotland) Airdrieonians | Free | |
| 20 June 2023 | MF | (England) Callum Roberts | (England) Scunthorpe United | Undisclosed | |
| 21 June 2023 | MF | (Northern Ireland) Matty Kennedy | (Scotland) Kilmarnock | Free | |
| 23 June 2023 | MF | (Scotland) Dean Campbell | (England) Barrow | Free | |
| 27 June 2023 | GK | (Scotland) Blessing Oluyemi | (Scotland) Peterhead | Free | |
| 6 July 2023 | MF | (Scotland) Arran Smith | (Scotland) Peterhead | Free | |
| 7 July 2023 | GK | (England) Joe Lewis | | Free | |
| 13 July 2023 | FW | (Scotland) Lewis Pirie | (England) Leeds United | £200,000 | |
| 18 July 2023 | DF | (Scotland) Milosz Ochmanski | (Scotland) Cove Rangers | Free | |
| 4 August 2023 | MF | (Albania) Ylber Ramadani | (Italy) Lecce | £1,100,000 | |
| 23 September 2023 | DF | (Scotland) Timi Fatona | (Scotland) Turriff United | Free | |
| 12 January 2024 | FW | (Scotland) Liam Harvey | (Scotland) Buckie Thistle | Free | |

=== Loans in ===
| Date | Pos | Name | From | Fee | Ref |
|---|---|---|---|---|---|
| 28 June 2023 | DF | (England) Rhys Williams | (England) Liverpool | January Loan | |
| 21 July 2023 | DF | (Israel) Or Dadia | (Israel) Hapoel Beer Sheva | January Loan | |
| 1 September 2023 | DF | (Denmark) Stefan Gartenmann | (Denmark) FC Midtjylland | Season Loan | |
| 28 January 2024 | MF | (Republic of Ireland) Killian Phillips | (England) Crystal Palace | End of Season Loan | |

=== Loans out ===
| Date | Pos | Name | To | Fee | Ref |
|---|---|---|---|---|---|
| 15 June 2023 | FW | (Scotland) Aaron Reid | (Scotland) Peterhead | January Loan | |
| 20 June 2023 | DF | (Scotland) Finlay Murray | (Scotland) Turriff United | Season Loan | |
| 22 June 2023 | FW | (Scotland) Evan Towler | (Scotland) Montrose | Season Loan | |
| 29 June 2023 | FW | (Scotland) Liam Harvey | (Scotland) Elgin City | January Loan | |
| 14 July 2023 | MF | (Scotland) Blair MacKenzie | (Scotland) Elgin City | Season Loan | |
| 20 July 2023 | MF | (Scotland) Adam Emslie | (Scotland) Formartine United | Season Loan | |
| 26 July 2023 | DF | (England) Jayden Richardson | (England) Stockport County | January Loan | |
| 4 August 2023 | MF | (Scotland) Dylan Lobban | (Scotland) Formartine United | January Loan | |
| 10 August 2023 | DF | (Malawi) Kieran Ngwenya | (Scotland) Partick Thistle | Season Loan | |
| 1 September 2023 | DF | (England) Anthony Stewart | (England) Milton Keynes Dons | Season Loan | |
| 23 September 2023 | FW | (Scotland) Alfie Bavidge | (Scotland) Kelty Hearts | Season Loan | |
| 5 January 2024 | MF | (Scotland) Findlay Marshall | (Scotland) Edinburgh City | End of Season Loan | |
| 5 January 2024 | FW | (Scotland) Aaron Reid | (Scotland) Formartine United | End of Season Loan | |
| 5 January 2024 | MF | (Scotland) Dylan Lobban | (Scotland) Forfar Athletic | End of Season Loan | |
| 12 January 2024 | DF | (England) Jayden Richardson | (England) Colchester United | End of Season Loan | |
| 19 January 2024 | MF | (Scotland) Alfie Stewart | (Scotland) Peterhead | End of Season Loan | |
| 25 January 2024 | FW | (Netherlands) Vicente Besuijen | (Netherlands) FC Emmen | End of Season Loan | |
| 14 February 2024 | MF | (Scotland) Tom Ritchie | (Scotland) Buckie Thistle | End of Season Loan | |
| 19 February 2024 | FW | (Senegal) Pape Habib Guèye | (Norway) Kristiansund BK | End of Season Loan | |

== See also ==
- List of Aberdeen F.C. seasons
