= Graeme Shinnie =

Scottish footballer (born 1991)

- Shinnie playing for Inverness CT in October 2026

Personal information
- Full name: Graeme Garry Shinnie
- Date of birth: 4 August 1991 (age 35)
- Place of birth: Aberdeen, Scotland
- Height: 1.75 m (5 ft 9 in)
- Positions: Defensive midfielder; left-back

Team information
- Current team: Inverness Caledonian Thistle

Youth career
- 2008–2010: Inverness Caledonian Thistle

Senior career*
Years	Team	Apps	(Gls)
2009–2015	Inverness Caledonian Thistle	156	(6)
2010	→ Forres Mechanics (loan)		
2015–2019	Aberdeen	144	(8)
2019–2022	Derby County	85	(6)
2022–2023	Wigan Athletic	29	(0)
2023	→ Aberdeen (loan)	13	(2)
2023–2026	Aberdeen	105	(2)
2026–	Inverness Caledonian Thistle	0	(0)

International career^{‡}
2012	Scotland U21	2	(0)
2018–2019	Scotland	6	(0)
- * Club domestic league appearances and goals as of 23:19, 27 June 2026 (UTC) ‡ National team caps and goals as of 07:55, 14 October 2019 (UTC)

Graeme Garry Shinnie (born 4 August 1991) is a Scottish professional footballer who plays as a defensive midfielder or left back for Scottish Championship side, Inverness Caledonian Thistle.

He has previously played for Aberdeen, Forres Mechanics, Derby County and Wigan Athletic. Shinnie made six full international appearances for Scotland between May 2018 and March 2019.

== Career ==
=== Inverness Caledonian Thistle ===
Shinnie started his career playing for Dyce Boys Club, a boy's club in Aberdeen, alongside brother Andrew. He joined Inverness Caledonian Thistle in July 2009, at the age of 17. He made his senior debut for them in the Scottish League Cup on 1 August 2009, before making his League debut on 26 September 2009.

Shinnie went on loan to Forres Mechanics in the Scottish Highland Football League in February 2010. His loan spell was extended until the end of the season. Shinnie was offered a contract extension by Inverness on 30 November 2010, agreeing a 3-year deal on 13 December 2010. He suffered an intestinal problem that stopped him from playing between January and August 2011.

In the 2011–12 season, Graeme's brother Andrew joined Inverness on a free transfer from Rangers. Shinnie scored his first goal of his Inverness career on 27 August 2011 in a 2–1 win over Kilmarnock and after the match, manager Terry Butcher expressed delight for Shinnie on his first goal. Following a 3–1 loss against Dundee United on 17 September 2011, captain Richie Foran spoken out about Shinnie, stating he was worthy of pass marks. After two-months spell out for the side, Shinnie made his return in a 2–1 loss against Rangers on 17 December 2011. Despite the performance, Butcher praised the returning Shinnie and Lee Cox. In December 2012, Shinnie signed a new contract extension, keeping him until 2015, having vowed to remain at the club.

In the 2014 Scottish League Cup Final, Shinnie played throughout the match until it went to a penalty shoot-out, won by opponents Aberdeen. He was selected in the 2013–14 Premiership PFA Scotland Team of the Year. In April 2015, Shinnie helped Inverness to reach the Scottish Cup Final; Caley went on to win the trophy, beating Falkirk 2–1 on 30 May 2015, with Shinnie lifting the trophy as captain in his last game for the club.

=== Aberdeen ===
In January 2015 it was announced that Shinnie had signed a three-year contract with Aberdeen, despite interest from Football League Championship clubs, and would join the club when the summer transfer window opened in June 2015. He made his competitive debut for Aberdeen on 2 July 2015, against FK Shkëndija in the first qualifying round of the Europa League. He scored his first goal for Aberdeen on 9 August 2015, in a 2–0 league win against Kilmarnock.

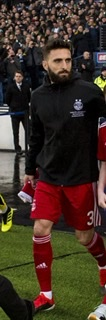
Shinnie at the 2018 Scottish League Cup final.

Shinnie signed a new contract with Aberdeen in January 2017, which ran until its expiry in summer 2019. In May 2017 he was made team captain, after it was announced that Ryan Jack had signed a pre-contract agreement with Rangers. During his four-year spell at Pittodrie, he took part in three finals (the 2016–17 and 2018–19 League Cup finals, and the 2017 Scottish Cup Final), losing to Celtic on each occasion. In the Premiership, Aberdeen finished runners-up to Celtic three times.

=== Derby County ===
In May 2019 it was announced that Shinnie would join English club Derby County in July 2019 on a free transfer, signing a three-year contract. He scored his first goal for the club, an injury time winner, against Wigan Athletic on 23 October 2019.

=== Wigan Athletic ===
In January 2022 he signed for Wigan Athletic, for an undisclosed transfer fee, signing a two-and-a-half-year contract.

=== Return to Aberdeen ===
He returned to Aberdeen on loan in January 2023. In June 2023 he signed a permanent three-year contract, and was designated captain.

He made his 600th professional appearance on 8 March 2025, scoring a goal, in a Scottish Cup match against Queen's Park.

On his 300th appearance for the club in all competitions, Shinnie captained Aberdeen in the 2025 Scottish Cup final which they won on penalties against Celtic (he was among the four Aberdeen players to score their penalties) for a first win in the competition for 35 years; as well as joining a small group of players to win the trophy with two clubs outside the Old Firm, he became the first man to lift the cup as captain of two different teams.

In May 2026 it was announced that he would leave Aberdeen at the end of his contract the following month.

=== Return to Inverness ===
On 26 May 2026, it was announced that Shinnie had signed a pre-contract agreement to re-join Inverness Caledonian Thistle on a two-year deal.

== International career ==
Shinnie made his debut for the Scotland national under-21 football team in April 2012. On 29 September 2015, he was called up to the senior squad for games against Poland and Gibraltar. He was called up again in October 2017, and in May 2018.

Shinnie made his full Scotland debut on 29 May 2018, in a 2–0 defeat to Peru. In March 2019 he was selected to play at left-back in a UEFA Euro 2020 qualifying match away to Kazakhstan, but was at fault for one of the goals as Scotland lost 3–0. Afterwards, Shinnie acknowledged that he had performed poorly and would be unlikely to be selected again once Andy Robertson and Kieran Tierney were available. That match was Shnnie's sixth and final appearance for Scotland.

== Personal life ==
Shinnie is the younger brother of fellow footballer Andrew Shinnie, who joined him at Inverness in 2011. The first time that the two brothers faced each other in a competitive game was in a 2016–17 Scottish Cup semi-final, between Andrew's Hibernian and Graeme's Aberdeen. The brothers grew up in Cove Bay and attended Kincorth Academy.

Shinnie has Crohn's disease.

== Playing style ==
Originally a left back at Inverness, Shinnie played primarily as a central midfielder at Aberdeen.

== Career statistics ==
As of match played 17 May 2026

Appearances and goals by club, season and competition
Club	Season	League			National cup (Note: Includes Scottish Cup, FA Cup)		League cup (Note: Includes Scottish League Cup, EFL Cup)		Europe		Other		Total	
Club	Season	Division	Apps	Goals	Apps	Goals	Apps	Goals	Apps	Goals	Apps	Goals	Apps	Goals
Inverness Caledonian Thistle	2009–10	Scottish First Division	1	0	0	0	1	0	–		1 (Note: Appearance in Scottish Challenge Cup)	0	3	0
Inverness Caledonian Thistle	2010–11	Scottish Premier League	19	0	2	0	2	0	–		–		23	0
Inverness Caledonian Thistle	2011–12	Scottish Premier League	26	1	3	0	1	0	–		–		30	1
Inverness Caledonian Thistle	2012–13	Scottish Premier League	37	0	3	0	4	1	–		–		44	1
Inverness Caledonian Thistle	2013–14	Scottish Premiership	36	3	4	0	4	0	–		–		44	3
Inverness Caledonian Thistle	2014–15	Scottish Premiership	37	2	6	1	0	0	–		–		43	3
Inverness Caledonian Thistle	Total		156	6	18	1	12	1	0	0	1	0	187	8
Aberdeen	2015–16	Scottish Premiership	37	1	1	0	1	0	6 (Note: Appearances in UEFA Europa League)	0	–		45	1
Aberdeen	2016–17	Scottish Premiership	36	2	5	1	4	0	6 (Note: Soccerbase omit lineups for Aberdeen's 2016–17 UEFA Europa League third qualifying round match away to Maribor on 4 August 2016 and for all four of their 2017–18 Europa League qualifying round matches. See the Aberdeen FC Heritage Trust site or Soccerway for confirmation of Shinnie's participation in these five matches.)	0	–		51	3
Aberdeen	2017–18	Scottish Premiership	35	2	4	1	2	0	4	1	–		45	4
Aberdeen	2018–19	Scottish Premiership	36	3	5	0	4	1	2	0	–		47	4
Aberdeen	Total		144	8	15	2	11	1	18	1	0	0	188	12
Derby County	2019–20	Championship	23	2	2	0	2	0	–		–		27	2
Derby County	2020–21	Championship	41	3	0	0	2	0	–		–		43	3
Derby County	2021–22	Championship	21	1	1	0	1	0	–		–		23	1
Derby County	Total		85	6	3	0	5	0	0	0	0	0	93	6
Wigan Athletic	2021–22	League One	10	0	0	0	0	0	–		1 (Note: Appearance in EFL Trophy)	0	11	0
Wigan Athletic	2022–23	Championship	19	0	0	1	0	0	–		–		20	0
Wigan Athletic	Total		29	0	0	1	0	0	0	0	1	0	31	0
Aberdeen (loan)	2022–23	Scottish Premiership	13	2	0	0	1	0	–		–		14	2
Aberdeen	2023–24	Scottish Premiership	37	1	3	1	4	1	6 (Note: Two appearances in the Europa League, four appearances in the Europa Conference League)	0	–		50	3
Aberdeen	2024–25	Scottish Premiership	36	1	5	1	7	2	0	0	–		48	4
Aberdeen	2025–26	Scottish Premiership	32	0	3	1	2	0	8	0	–		45	1
Aberdeen	Total		105	2	11	3	13	3	14	0	0	0	143	8
Inverness Caledonian Thistle	2026–27	Scottish Championship	0	0	0	0	0	0	–		–		0	0
Career total			532	24	47	6	43	5	32	1	2	0	656	36

== Honours ==
Forres Mechanics

- Highland League Cup: 2009–10

Inverness Caledonian Thistle

- Scottish Cup: 2014–15
- North of Scotland Cup: 2009–10

Wigan Athletic

- EFL League One: 2021–22

Aberdeen

- Scottish Cup: 2024–25

Individual

- Derby County Player of the Year: 2020–21
- PFA Scotland Team of the Year (Premiership): 2013–14, 2014–15, 2017–18, 2018–19
