= Ross Doohan =

Scottish footballer

Personal information
- Date of birth: 29 March 1998 (age 28)
- Place of birth: Clydebank, Scotland
- Height: 6 ft 1 in (1.86 m)
- Position: Goalkeeper

Team information
- Current team: Celtic
- Number: 31

Senior career*
Years	Team	Apps	(Gls)
2015–2022	Celtic	0	(0)
2015	→ Cumbernauld Colts (loan)	2	(0)
2017–2018	→ Greenock Morton (loan)	0	(0)
2018–2019	→ Ayr United (loan)	36	(0)
2019–2020	→ Ayr United (loan)	27	(0)
2020–2021	→ Ross County (loan)	5	(0)
2021	→ Dundee United (loan)	2	(0)
2021–2022	→ Tranmere Rovers (loan)	30	(0)
2022–2023	Tranmere Rovers	25	(0)
2023	Forest Green Rovers	19	(0)
2023–2025	Aberdeen	16	(0)
2025–	Celtic	0	(0)

International career^{‡}
2013	Scotland U16	2	(0)
2014–2015	Scotland U17	2	(0)
2016–2017	Scotland U19	2	(0)
2017	Scotland U20	1	(0)
2018–2020	Scotland U21	13	(0)
2025–	Scotland	1	(0)
- * Club domestic league appearances and goals as of 17:49, 11 June 2025 (UTC) ‡ National team caps and goals as of 17:55, 9 June 2025 (UTC)

Ross Doohan (born 29 March 1998) is a Scottish professional footballer who plays as a goalkeeper for Scottish Premiership club Celtic and the Scotland national team.

Doohan began his career at Celtic, spending time on loan at Cumbernauld Colts, Greenock Morton, Ayr United, Ross County, Dundee United and Tranmere Rovers. His time at Tranmere became permanent, and he later played for Forest Green Rovers and Aberdeen, before returning to first club Celtic in 2025.

Doohan was a Scotland youth international, playing for them up to under-21 level, before making his senior debut in 2025.

== Club career ==
=== Celtic ===
Doohan began his career with Celtic, spending time on loan with Cumbernauld Colts in October 2015, where he made 4 appearances in all competitions. He moved on loan to Greenock Morton in August 2017, returning to Celtic in January 2018, having failed to make any senior appearances whilst at Greenock.

After signing a new four-year contract with Celtic, he moved on loan to Ayr United in July 2018, making his senior debut on 14 July 2018 in a Scottish League Cup game against former club Greenock Morton. Having played for Ayr for the whole of the 2018–19 season, Doohan rejoined Ayr on loan for a second spell in July 2019.

In July 2020 he was linked with a third spell at Ayr. On 1 August 2020 he signed for Ross County on a season-long loan. With Ross Laidlaw largely preferred in goal, he made only five appearances for Ross County and returned to Celtic in January 2021. He then joined Dundee United on an emergency loan in April 2021 following an injury to their first choice-goalkeeper, Benjamin Siegrist.

=== Tranmere Rovers ===
In August 2021 he moved on loan to Tranmere Rovers. The transfer became permanent in July 2022.

=== Forest Green Rovers ===
He transferred to Forest Green Rovers in January 2023.

=== Aberdeen ===
He transferred to Aberdeen in July 2023. He struggled for playing time at Pittodrie, however, with Dimitar Mitov preferred in goal.

His last Aberdeen game was the 2–2 league home draw versus Rangers on 13 April 2025. He was unused from the bench when Aberdeen defeated Celtic on penalties in the 2025 Scottish Cup final.

Doohan was released in May 2025.

=== Return to Celtic ===
Doohan returned to Celtic on 20 June 2025, signing a three-year deal with his boyhood club.

== International career ==
Doohan represented Scotland at various youth international levels.

Selected for the Scotland under-20 squad in the 2017 Toulon Tournament, he played in the third place play-off match, as Scotland won the bronze medal. It was the nation's first ever medal at the competition. Selected for the under-21 squad in the 2018 Toulon Tournament, he played as the team lost to Turkey in a penalty shoot-out for third-place.

On 8 June 2025, head coach Steve Clarke called up Doohan to the Scotland senior team to travel for the friendly against Liechtenstein on 9 June 2025, following injuries to fellow goalkeepers Zander Clark, Craig Gordon, Angus Gunn, Liam Kelly and Robby McCrorie. Doohan made his international debut in the game, keeping a clean sheet in a 4–0 win.

== Career statistics ==
As of 11 June 2025

Appearances and goals by club, season and competition
Club	Season	League			National cup		League cup		Other		Total	
Club	Season	Division	Apps	Goals	Apps	Goals	Apps	Goals	Apps	Goals	Apps	Goals
Celtic	2015–16	Scottish Premiership	0	0	0	0	0	0	0	0	0	0
Celtic	2016–17	Scottish Premiership	0	0	0	0	0	0	3 (Note: Appearance(s) in the Scottish Challenge Cup, in which age-restricted teams from the Scottish Premiership clubs compete against senior clubs.)	0	3	0
Celtic	2017–18	Scottish Premiership	0	0	0	0	0	0	1	0	1	0
Celtic	2018–19	Scottish Premiership	0	0	0	0	0	0	0	0	0	0
Celtic	2019–20	Scottish Premiership	0	0	0	0	0	0	0	0	0	0
Celtic	2020–21	Scottish Premiership	0	0	0	0	0	0	0	0	0	0
Celtic	2021–22	Scottish Premiership	0	0	0	0	0	0	0	0	0	0
Celtic	Total		0	0	0	0	0	0	4	0	4	0
Cumbernauld Colts (loan)	2015–16	Lowland League	2	0	1	0	0	0	1 (Note: Appearance in the South of Scotland Cup.)	0	4	0
Greenock Morton (loan)	2017–18	Scottish Championship	0	0	0	0	0	0	0	0	0	0
Ayr United (loan)	2018–19	Scottish Championship	36	0	2	0	6	0	3 (Note: One appearance in the Scottish Challenge Cup; Two appearances in the Scottish Premiership play-offs.)	0	47	0
Ayr United (loan)	2019–20	Scottish Championship	27	0	2	0	4	0	0	0	33	0
Ross County (loan)	2020–21	Scottish Premiership	5	0	0	0	0	0	0	0	5	0
Dundee United (loan)	2020–21	Scottish Premiership	2	0	0	0	0	0	0	0	2	0
Tranmere Rovers (loan)	2021–22	EFL League Two	30	0	2	0	1	0	1	0	34	0
Forest Green Rovers	2022–23	EFL League One	19	0	1	0	0	0	0	0	20	0
Aberdeen	2023–24	Scottish Premiership	1	0	1	0	0	0	0	0	2	0
Aberdeen	2024–25	Scottish Premiership	15	0	2	0	1	0	0	0	18	0
Aberdeen	Total		16	0	3	0	1	0	0	0	20	0
Celtic	2025–26	Scottish Premiership	0	0	0	0	0	0	0	0	0	0
Career total			137	0	11	0	12	0	9	0	169	0

== Honours ==
Aberdeen

- Scottish Cup: 2024–25

Celtic

- Scottish Premiership 2025–26
