= Slobodan Rubežić =

Montenegrin footballer (born 2000)

Personal information
- Date of birth: 21 March 2000 (age 26)
- Place of birth: Belgrade, FR Yugoslavia
- Height: 1.94 m (6 ft 4 in)
- Position: Centre-back

Team information
- Current team: Korona Kielce
- Number: 23

Youth career
- –2017: Vojvodina
- 2017–2019: Čukarički

Senior career*
Years	Team	Apps	(Gls)
2019–2021	Čukarički	0	(0)
2019–2020	→ Novi Pazar (loan)	27	(1)
2021–2022	Arda Kardzhali	5	(1)
2022–2023	Novi Pazar	46	(3)
2023–2025	Aberdeen	38	(0)
2025	→ Novi Pazar (loan)	15	(1)
2025–	Korona Kielce	24	(0)

International career^{‡}
2023–	Montenegro	15	(1)
- * Club domestic league appearances and goals as of 17:42, 15 November 2026 (UTC) ‡ National team caps and goals as of 17:42, 15 November 2026 (UTC)

Slobodan Rubežić (Montenegrin Cyrillic: Слободан Рубежић; born 21 March 2000) is a professional footballer who plays as a centre-back for Ekstraklasa club Korona Kielce. Born in Serbia, he plays for the Montenegro national team.

== Club career ==
Rubežić started his career with Vojvodina before signing his first professional contract with Čukarički. After a spell with Arda Kardzhali, he returned to Novi Pazar on a permanent deal in January 2022, signing a two-year contract.

In July 2023, he joined Scottish Premiership side Aberdeen for an undisclosed fee, signing a three-year contract with the option of a fourth. During a game against St Mirren in January 2025, Rubežić made errors leading to two goals and then asked to be substituted. A month later, Rubežić returned to Novi Pazar on loan.

On 20 August 2025, Rubežić signed for Polish Ekstraklasa club Korona Kielce on a three-year deal for an undisclosed fee.

== International career ==
Born in Serbia, Rubežić is of Montenegrin descent from Nikšić through his mother. In October 2023, Rubežić was called up to the Montenegro national team for the first time. He made his debut in a friendly match against Lebanon on 12 October.

On 19 November, Rubežić scored his first goal for Montenegro in a 3–1 loss to Hungary in UEFA Euro 2024 qualifying.

== Career statistics ==
=== Club ===
As of match played 23 May 2026

Appearances and goals by club, season and competition
Club	Season	League			National cup (Note: Includes Serbian Cup, Bulgarian Cup, Scottish Cup, Polish Cup)		League cup (Note: Includes Scottish FA Cup)		Europe		Other		Total	
Club	Season	Division	Apps	Goals	Apps	Goals	Apps	Goals	Apps	Goals	Apps	Goals	Apps	Goals
Čukarički	2018–19	Serbian SuperLiga	0	0	0	0	—		—		—		0	0
Čukarički	2020–21	Serbian SuperLiga	0	0	0	0	—		—		—		0	0
Čukarički	Total		0	0	0	0	—		—		—		0	0
Novi Pazar (loan)	2019–20	Serbian SuperLiga	27	1	1	0	—		—		—		28	1
Arda Kardzhali	2021–22	First Professional League	5	0	2	0	—		—		—		7	0
Novi Pazar	2021–22	Serbian SuperLiga	11	2	2	0	—		—		—		13	2
Novi Pazar	2022–23	Serbian SuperLiga	35	2	0	0	—		—		—		35	2
Novi Pazar	Total		46	4	2	0	—		—		—		48	4
Aberdeen	2023–24	Scottish Premiership	18	0	1	0	4	0	8 (Note: Two appearances in UEFA Europa League, five appearances in UEFA Europa Conference League)	0	—		31	0
Aberdeen	2024–25	Scottish Premiership	20	0	1	0	5	1	—		—		26	1
Aberdeen	Total		38	0	2	0	9	1	8	1	—		57	1
Novi Pazar (loan)	2024–25	Serbian SuperLiga	15	1	1	0	—		—		—		16	1
Korona Kielce	2025–26	Ekstraklasa	12	0	3	2	—		—		—		15	2
Career total			143	6	11	2	9	1	8	0	0	0	171	9

=== International ===
As of match played 15 November 2026

Appearances and goals by national team and year
National team	Year	Apps	Goals
Montenegro	2023	3	1
Montenegro	2024	4	0
Montenegro	2025	4	0
Montenegro	2026	4	0
Total		15	1

Scores and results list Montenegro's goal tally first, score column indicates score after each Rubežić goal

List of international goals scored by Slobodan Rubežić
No.	Date	Venue	Cap	Opponent	Score	Result	Competition
1	19 November 2023	Puskás Aréna, Budapest, Hungary	3	Hungary	1–0	1–3	2024 UEFA Euro qualifying
