= Richard Jensen (footballer) =

Finnish footballer (born 1996)

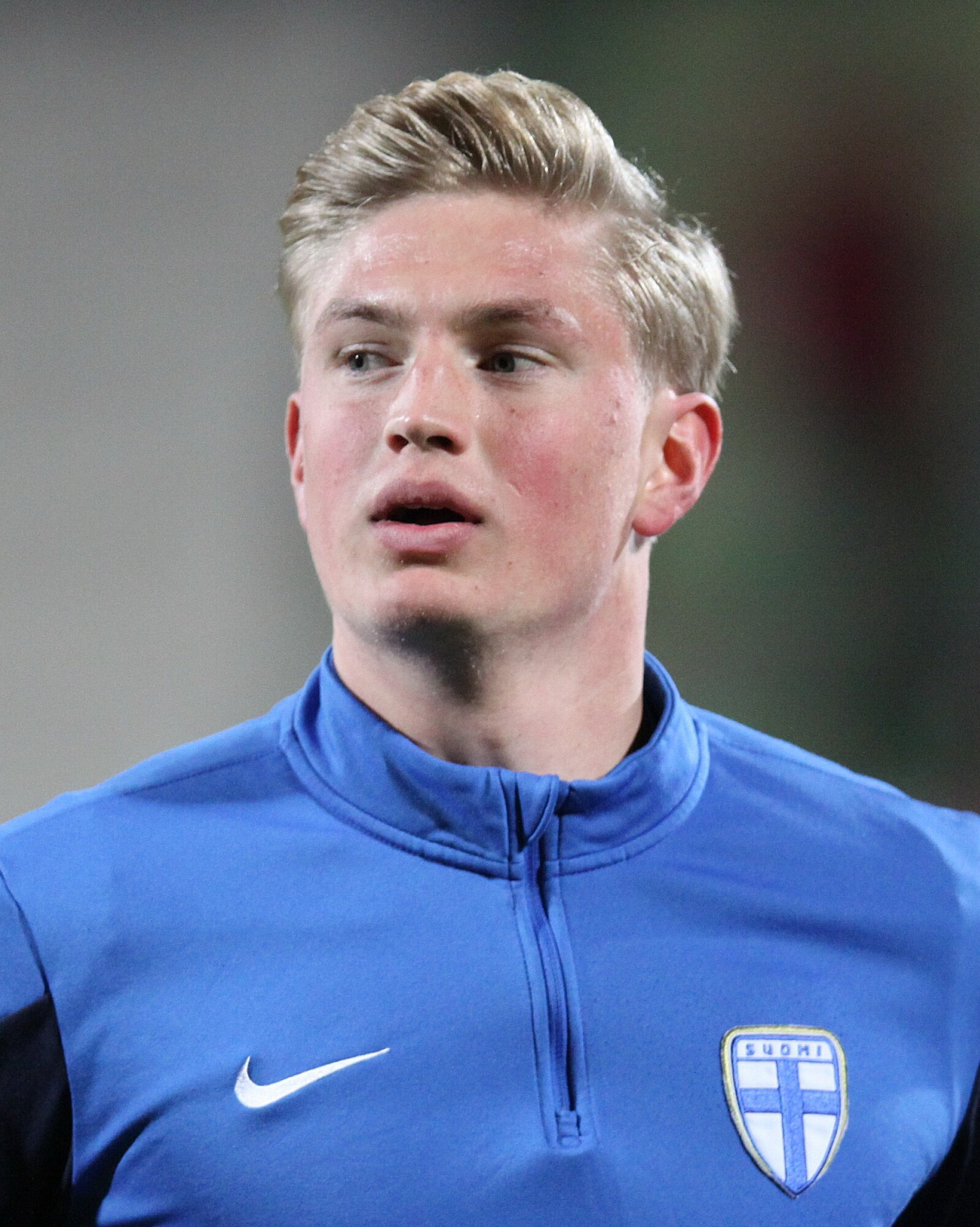
- Jensen with Finland U21 in 2015

Personal information
- Full name: Richard Olav Jensen
- Date of birth: 17 March 1996 (age 30)
- Place of birth: Porvoo, Finland
- Height: 1.85 m (6 ft 1 in)
- Position: Centre-back

Team information
- Current team: Panionios
- Number: 29

Youth career
- Futura
- –2011: Honka
- 2012: HJK
- 2012–2016: Twente

Senior career*
Years	Team	Apps	(Gls)
2016–2018	Jong Twente	28	(0)
2017–2018	Twente	10	(0)
2018–2022	Roda JC	82	(7)
2022–2023	Górnik Zabrze	34	(1)
2023–2025	Aberdeen	29	(0)
2024–2025	→ Vejle (loan)	11	(1)
2025–	Panionios	11	(0)

International career^{‡}
2012–2013	Finland U17	3	(0)
2013–2014	Finland U18	6	(1)
2014	Finland U19	3	(0)
2015–2018	Finland U21	21	(0)
2022–2024	Finland	14	(0)
- * Club domestic league appearances and goals as of 20 April 2026 ‡ National team caps and goals as of 4 June 2024

Richard Olav Jensen (born 17 March 1996) is a Finnish professional footballer who plays as a centre-back for Greek Super League 2 club Panionios and the Finland national team. Jensen began his career with Futura and made his debut on senior level on 14 August 2016 at the age of 20 in a Tweede Divisie match in the ranks of the Jong Twente in a match against AFC Amsterdam. He has also played for Roda JC, Górnik Zabrze, Aberdeen and for Vejle on loan.

== Club career ==
=== Twente ===
Jensen joined FC Twente's youth academy in 2012 from HJK Helsinki. On 20 January 2017, he signed his first professional contract with Twente for three years. Exactly a year later, on 20 January 2018, he made his professional debut for Twente in a 1–1 Eredivisie tie with Roda JC Kerkrade.

=== Roda ===
On 23 July 2018, Jensen joined Eerste Divisie club Roda, signing a two-year deal. He made his debut for Roda on 17 August 2018 playing full 90 minutes in a match against Jong Ajax.

=== Górnik Zabrze ===
On 20 July 2022, Ekstraklasa side Górnik Zabrze announced the signing of Jensen on a one-year contract. On 7 February 2023, his contract was extended until the end of June 2024.

=== Aberdeen F.C. ===
On 23 August 2023, Jensen signed a three-year deal with Scottish club Aberdeen, for a rumoured £400,000 transfer fee. He debuted with his new team in Scottish Premiership on 27 August 2023, in a 2–2 away draw against St Mirren. Jensen also represented Aberdeen in the 2023–24 UEFA Europa Conference League, playing in all six group stage matches against Eintracht Frankfurt, PAOK, and HJK Helsinki.

==== Vejle Boldklub (loan) ====
On 23 August 2024, Jensen joined Danish Superliga club Vejle Boldklub on a season-long loan deal. He made his debut for Vejle on 30 August 2024 in a Danish Superliga match in Lyngby Stadium, against Lyngby Boldklub.

=== Panionios ===
Upon his release from Aberdeen, Jensen joined Super League Greece 2 side Panionios.

== International career ==
Jensen was a youth international for Finland at various youth levels. He captained Finland U21 in the 2019 UEFA European Under-21 Championship qualification.

He made his debut for the Finland national team on 7 June 2022 in a UEFA Nations League qualification game in Helsinki Olympic Stadium against Montenegro.

== Personal life ==
Jensen's younger brother, Fredrik Jensen is also a professional footballer at Aris.

== Career statistics ==
=== Club ===
As of match played 18 May 2025

Appearances and goals by club, season and competition
Club	Season	League			National cup (Note: Includes KNVB Cup, Polish Cup, and Scottish Cup)		League cup (Note: Includes Scottish League Cup)		Europe		Total	
Club	Season	Division	Apps	Goals	Apps	Goals	Apps	Goals	Apps	Goals	Apps	Goals
Jong Twente	2016–17	Tweede Divisie	23	0	0	0	—		—		23	0
Jong Twente	2017–18	Derde Divisie	5	0	0	0	—		—		5	0
Jong Twente	Total		28	0	0	0	0	0	0	0	28	0
Twente	2017–18	Eredivisie	10	0	2	0	—		—		12	0
Roda JC Kerkrade	2018–19	Eerste Divisie	19	1	3	0	–		–		22	1
Roda JC Kerkrade	2019–20	Eerste Divisie	8	2	0	0	–		–		8	2
Roda JC Kerkrade	2020–21	Eerste Divisie	23	2	2	0	–		–		25	2
Roda JC Kerkrade	2021–22	Eerste Divisie	32	2	2	0	–		–		34	2
Roda JC Kerkrade	Total		82	7	7	0	–		–		89	7
Górnik Zabrze	2022–23	Ekstraklasa	29	1	2	0	–		–		31	1
Górnik Zabrze	2023–24	Ekstraklasa	5	0	0	0	–		–		5	0
Górnik Zabrze	Total		34	1	2	0	–		–		36	1
Aberdeen	2023–24	Scottish Premiership	28	0	3	0	1	0	7 (Note: Appearances in UEFA Europa League and UEFA Europa Conference League)	0	39	0
Aberdeen	2024–25	Scottish Premiership	1	0	0	0	1	0	–		2	0
Aberdeen	Total		29	0	3	0	2	0	7	0	41	0
Vejle (loan)	2024–25	Danish Superliga	11	1	1	0	—		—		12	1
Panionios	2025–26	Super League Greece 2	0	0	0	0	–		–		0	0
Career total			194	9	15	0	2	0	7	0	219	9

=== International ===
As of match played 4 June 2024

Appearances and goals by national team, year and competition
Team	Year	Competitive		Friendly		Total	
Team	Year	Apps	Goals	Apps	Goals	Apps	Goals
Finland	2022	5 (Note: Appearances in the 2022–23 UEFA Nations League.)	0	0	0	5	0
Finland	2023	6 (Note: Appearances in the UEFA Euro 2024 qualifying.)	0	1	0	7	0
Finland	2024	0	0	2	0	2	0
Total		11	0	3	0	14	0

== Honours ==
Aberdeen

- Scottish League Cup runner-up: 2023–24
