= Fletcher Boyd =

Scottish footballer

Personal information
- Date of birth: 26 January 2008 (age 18)
- Place of birth: Aberdeen, Scotland
- Position: Attacking midfielder

Team information
- Current team: Aston Villa
- Number: 79

Youth career
- Deveronvale
- 2017–2024: Aberdeen

Senior career*
Years	Team	Apps	(Gls)
2024–2025	Aberdeen	6	(2)
2025–	Aston Villa	0	(0)

International career^{‡}
2023–2024	Scotland U16	8	(2)
2024–2025	Scotland U17	6	(3)
2024–	Scotland U19	4	(1)
- * Club domestic league appearances and goals as of 20:05, 23 April 2026 (UTC) ‡ National team caps and goals as of 13:33, 5 January 2026 (UTC)

Fletcher Boyd (born 26 January 2008) is a Scottish footballer who plays as an attacking midfielder for Premier League club Aston Villa. He is a product of the Aberdeen academy and made twelve appearances for their senior side before transferring to Aston Villa's academy at the age of seventeen in 2025.

== Club career ==
=== Aberdeen ===
Boyd attended the SFA Performance School. He was then was approached by the youth academy at Aberdeen.

In May 2023 whilst at Aberdeen F.C. Academy Boyd won the 2023–24 Club Academy Scotland U18 (Elite) League, with 30 goal contributions. He earned his first team debut against Hibernian on 12 May 2024. He was substituted on in the 82th minute, and scored in the 90+2 minute. In his second appearance, against Livingston on 15 May 2024, he scored in the 90+3 minute.

=== Aston Villa ===
On 4 September 2025, Fletcher signed with Aston Villa. The transfer was for what Aberdeen described as a "significant fee", reported by local media as £1 million. On 25 February 2026, Boyd signed a contract extension with Aston Villa after featuring heavily for their Under-18 squad.

== International career ==
Boyd has represented Scotland 8 times at under-16 level. He scored two goals against Norway on 4 March 2024. In September 2025, Boyd was called up to the Scotland U19 squad for the first time ahead of two friendlies against Italy U19 on 10 and 13 October.

== Career statistics ==
As of match played 27 October 2026

Appearances and goals by club, season and competition
Club	Season	League			National cup		League cup		Other		Total	
Club	Season	Division	Apps	Goals	Apps	Goals	Apps	Goals	Apps	Goals	Apps	Goals
Aberdeen	2023–24	Scottish Premiership	2	2	—		—		—		2	2
Aberdeen	2024–25	Scottish Premiership	2	0	2	0	2	0	—		6	0
Aberdeen	2025–26	Scottish Premiership	2	0	0	0	1	0	—		3	0
Aberdeen	Total		6	2	2	0	3	0	0	0	11	2
Aberdeen U20	2024–25	—	—		—		—		1 (Note: Appearance in Scottish Challenge Cup)	0	1	0
Aston Villa U21	2025–26	—	—		—		—		1 (Note: Appearances in EFL Trophy)	0	1	0
Aston Villa U21	2026–27	—	—		—		—		1	1	1	1
Aston Villa U21	Total		0	0	0	0	0	0	2	1	2	1
Career total			6	2	2	0	3	0	3	1	14	3

== Honours ==
Aberdeen

- Scottish Cup: 2024–25
