= Topi Keskinen =

Finnish footballer (born 2003)

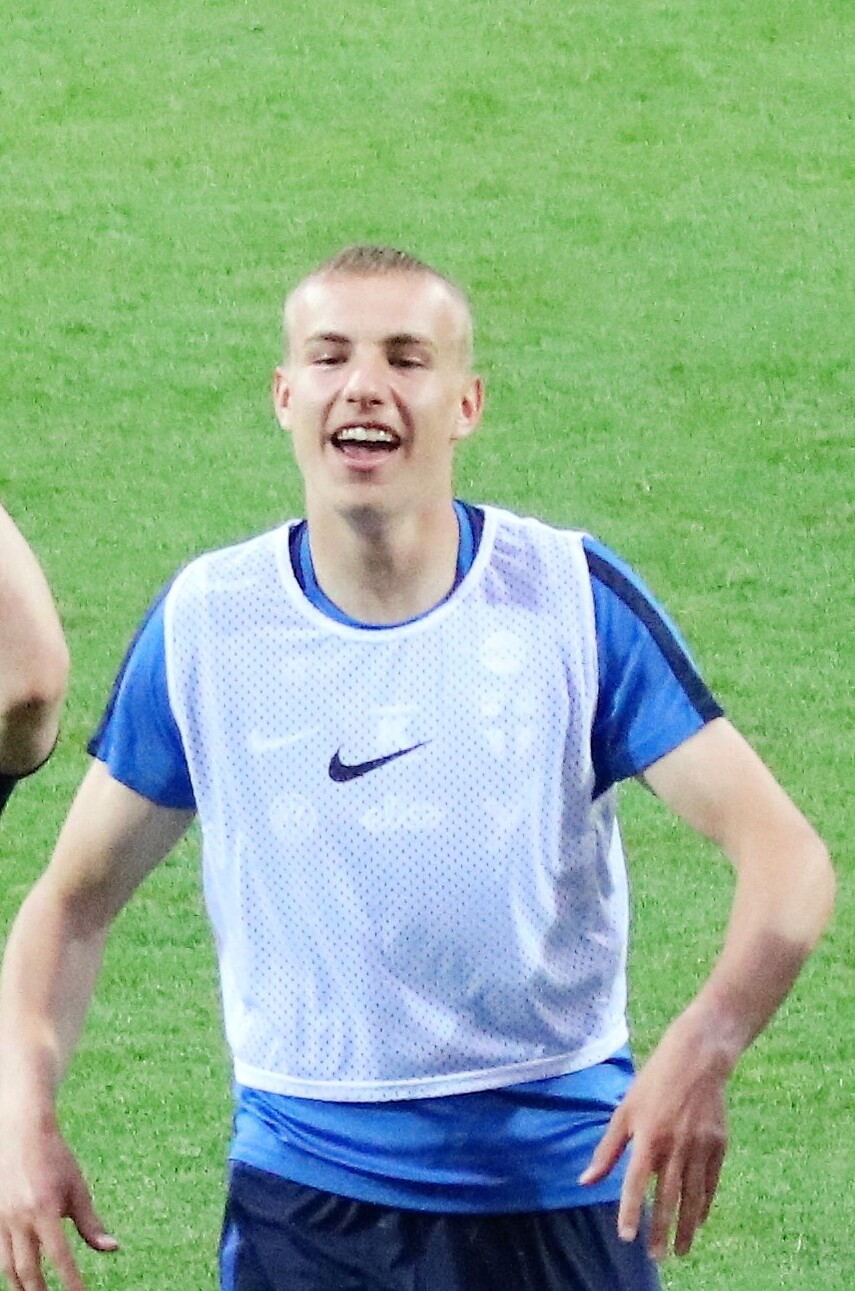
- Keskinen with Finland U21 in June 2022

Personal information
- Date of birth: 7 March 2003 (age 23)
- Place of birth: Espoo, Finland
- Height: 1.80 m (5 ft 11 in)
- Position: Winger

Team information
- Current team: OB
- Number: 9

Youth career
- –2020: MP

Senior career*
| Years | Team | Apps | (Gls) |
| 2019–2022 | MP | 68 | (13) |
| 2020 | → SavU (loan) | 3 | (0) |
| 2023–2024 | HJK | 42 | (8) |
| 2024–2026 | Aberdeen | 69 | (8) |
| 2026– | OB | 10 | (2) |

International career^{‡}
| 2022 | Finland U19 | 2 | (1) |
| 2022–2025 | Finland U21 | 15 | (4) |
| 2024– | Finland | 18 | (0) |
- * Club domestic league appearances and goals as of 14 September 2026 ‡ National team caps and goals as of 15 November 2026

Topi Keskinen (born 7 March 2003) is a Finnish professional footballer who plays as a winger for Danish Superliga club OB and for the Finland national team. Keskinen is known for his pace, dribbling and agility with the ball.

== Early life ==
Keskinen was born in Espoo, but soon after at his early age his family moved to Mikkeli in Eastern Finland. He started to play football in the youth sector of the local club Mikkelin Palloilijat (MP).

== Club career ==
=== MP ===
He made his senior debut with MP first team in 2019, when the club played in third-tier level Kakkonen. The club won a promotion, and Keskinen signed a three-year deal with MP. He was named in the first team squad for the 2020 Ykkönen season, in Finland's second tier. In 2020, he also played briefly for the associate farm club Savilahden Urheilijat (SavU) in the fourth tier Kolmonen. In his first years in Mikkeli, Keskinen played as a midfielder before moving to wing.

He finished the 2022 Ykkönen season scoring 10 goals and providing six assists for his team in the division.

=== HJK ===
Keskinen signed a three-year deal with Finnish champions HJK Helsinki on 23 November 2022, ahead of the 2023 Veikkausliiga season. On 8 February 2023, Keskinen scored four goals in his second competitive game for the club, in a 5–2 Finnish League Cup win over FC Lahti. The club ultimately won the league cup tournament.

He scored his first Veikkausliiga goal on 5 May 2023, in 2–1 away loss to KuPS. Keskinen also scored the winning goal, as HJK defeated Molde FK 1–0 in the first leg of the UEFA Champions League 2nd qualifying round, on 25 July 2023. He played in all 14 matches in the HJK's 2023–24 European campaign, in which HJK qualified to the UEFA Europa Conference League group stage.

In the end of the 2023 season, Keskinen won his first Finnish championship title with HJK, which was the fourth championship of HJK in a row. He was named The Player of the Year by the supporters of the club, and the Rookie of the Year in Veikkausliiga. Keskinen finished his first season in the league scoring twice and providing eight assists in 25 matches.

Keskinen started the 2024 season efficiently scoring four goals and providing one assist in the first four matches of the season, for which he was awarded the league's Player of the Month title in April 2024.

=== Aberdeen ===
On 12 August 2024, Keskinen moved to Scotland and signed a four-year deal with Scottish Premiership club Aberdeen for a transfer fee of €1 million, making him the second most expensive signing in Aberdeen's history. HJK also secured a sell-on clause in the transfer deal. Keskinen scored in his Aberdeen debut as a substitute on 17 August 2024, by a winning goal on a stoppage-time in a 1–0 Scottish League Cup win against Queen's Park. On 28 September, he scored his first goal in Scottish Premiership, a winning goal in a 2–1 away win against Dundee, providing also an assist to the first goal. Three days later, Keskinen received his first SPFL Team of the Week selection. Next round on 6 October, Keskinen scored his second goal in the league, and provided an assist for his team's second goal, in a 3–2 home win over Hearts. On 15 February 2025, Keskinen scored the winning goal, a screamer, in a 2–1 away win against Dundee, thus helping Aberdeen to break their 14-game winless run. In May 2025, Keskinen was named Aberdeen F.C. Young Player of the Year. They went on to win the 2024–25 Scottish Cup title, by beating Celtic in the final on penalties.

== International career ==
=== Youth ===
In March 2022, Keskinen was called up to Finland youth national team for the first time, when he was named in the Finland U19 squad for the 2022 UEFA European Under-19 Championship qualification Elite round games against Belgium, Italy and Germany. He made his youth national team debut on 23 March 2022 against Belgium, scoring a goal in the game.

He made his first appearance for the Finland under-21 national team on 7 June 2022, in a 3–0 home win against Azerbaijan, providing an assist in the game. On 21 November 2023, Keskinen scored a brace for Finland U21 team, in a 6–0 home win against Armenia. Keskinen made five appearances in total in the 2025 UEFA European Under-21 Championship qualification campaign, helping Finland U21 to qualify for the final tournament, for the second time in the nation's history. In the tournament, Keskinen scored two goals for Finland, helping his team to 2–2 draws against Netherlands and Denmark. He was also named the Player of the Match against Denmark by UEFA.

=== Senior ===
On 28 August 2024, Keskinen received his first call-up to Finland senior national team by head coach Markku Kanerva, for the 2024–25 UEFA Nations League B matches against Greece and England in September. He debuted on 7 September 2024 against Greece at the Karaiskakis Stadium. He substituted Oliver Antman in the 62nd minute as Greece won 3–0.

== Personal life ==
Keskinen is a Manchester United supporter, and has named Wayne Rooney his idol in football. During his free time, Keskinen is an avid fisherman; he has a tattoo of Rooney fishing on his forearm.

== Career statistics ==
=== Club ===
As of 14 September 2026

Appearances and goals by club, season and competition
| Club | Season | League | | | National cup (Note: Includes Suomen Cup, Scottish Cup, Danish Cup) | | League cup (Note: Appearances in Ykkönen Cup, Finnish League Cup and Scottish League Cup) | | Europe | | Total | |
| Club | Season | Division | Apps | Goals | Apps | Goals | Apps | Goals | Apps | Goals | Apps | Goals |
|---|---|---|---|---|---|---|---|---|---|---|---|---|
| MP | 2019 | Kakkonen | 1 | 0 | 0 | 0 | — | | — | | 1 | 0 |
| MP | 2020 | Ykkönen | 19 | 0 | 2 | 0 | — | | — | | 21 | 0 |
| MP | 2021 | Ykkönen | 24 | 3 | 3 | 0 | — | | — | | 27 | 3 |
| MP | 2022 | Ykkönen | 24 | 10 | 3 | 2 | 3 | 0 | — | | 30 | 12 |
| MP | Total | | 68 | 13 | 8 | 2 | 3 | 0 | 0 | 0 | 79 | 15 |
| Savilahden Urheilijat (loan) | 2020 | Kolmonen | 3 | 0 | — | | — | | — | | 3 | 0 |
| HJK | 2023 | Veikkausliiga | 25 | 2 | 1 | 0 | 4 | 4 | 14 (Note: Appearances in UEFA Champions League, UEFA Europa League and UEFA Europa Conference League) | 1 | 44 | 7 |
| HJK | 2024 | Veikkausliiga | 17 | 6 | 1 | 0 | 3 | 1 | 2 (Note: Appearances in UEFA Champions League) | 0 | 23 | 7 |
| HJK | Total | | 42 | 8 | 2 | 0 | 7 | 5 | 16 | 1 | 67 | 14 |
| Aberdeen | 2024–25 | Scottish Premiership | 36 | 5 | 4 | 0 | 3 | 1 | – | | 43 | 6 |
| Aberdeen | 2025–26 | Scottish Premiership | 33 | 3 | 3 | 0 | 2 | 0 | 7 (Note: Two appearances in UEFA Europa League and five appearances in UEFA Conference League) | 0 | 45 | 3 |
| Aberdeen | Total | | 69 | 8 | 7 | 0 | 5 | 1 | 7 | 0 | 88 | 9 |
| OB | 2026–27 | Danish Superliga | 8 | 1 | 2 | 1 | – | | – | | 10 | 2 |
| Career total | | | 190 | 30 | 23 | 3 | 18 | 7 | 23 | 1 | 250 | 40 |

=== International ===
As of match played 15 November 2026

| National team | Year | Competitive | | Friendly | | Total | |
| National team | Year | Apps | Goals | Apps | Goals | Apps | Goals |
|---|---|---|---|---|---|---|---|
| Finland | 2024 | 4 (Note: Appearances in the 2024–25 UEFA Nations League B.) | 0 | 0 | 0 | 4 | 0 |
| Finland | 2025 | 3 (Note: Appearances in the 2026 FIFA World Cup qualification.) | 0 | 2 | 0 | 5 | 0 |
| Finland | 2026 | 5 (Note: Appearances in the 2026–27 UEFA Nations League C.) | 0 | 4 (Note: Includes two appearances in the 2026 FIFA Series.) | 0 | 9 | 0 |
| Total | | 12 | 0 | 6 | 0 | 18 | 0 |

== Honours ==
HJK

- Veikkausliiga: 2023
- Finnish League Cup: 2023

Aberdeen

- Scottish Cup: 2024–25

Finland

- FIFA Series: 2026

Individual

- Veikkausliiga Team of the Year: 2023
- Veikkausliiga Rookie of the Year: 2023
- Veikkausliiga Player of the Month: April 2024
- Aberdeen Young Player of the Year: 2024–25
