= Leighton Clarkson =

English footballer (born 2001)

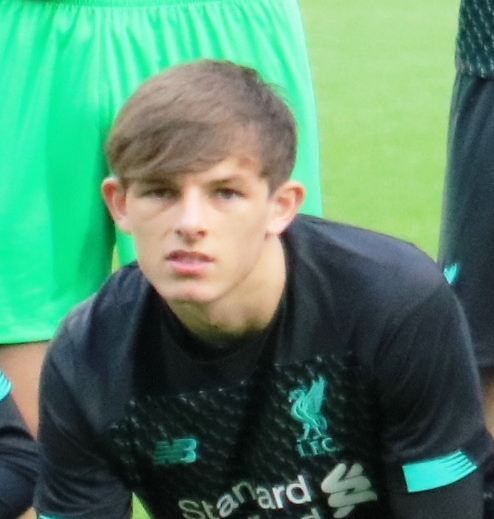
- Clarkson in 2019

Personal information
- Full name: Leighton Owen Clarkson
- Date of birth: 19 October 2001 (age 25)
- Place of birth: Blackburn, England
- Height: 1.75 m (5 ft 9 in)
- Position: Midfielder

Team information
- Current team: Blackpool
- Number: 7

Youth career
- –2019: Liverpool

Senior career*
Years	Team	Apps	(Gls)
2019–2023	Liverpool	0	(0)
2021–2022	→ Blackburn Rovers (loan)	7	(0)
2022–2023	→ Aberdeen (loan)	34	(5)
2023–2026	Aberdeen	83	(7)
2026–	Blackpool	13	(0)

International career^{‡}
2021–2022	England U20	5	(0)
- * Club domestic league appearances and goals as of 18:02, 12 May 2026 (UTC) ‡ National team caps and goals as of 10:44, 30 March 2022 (UTC)

Leighton Owen Clarkson (born 19 October 2001) is an English professional footballer who plays as a midfielder for Blackpool.

== Career ==
Clarkson made his professional debut for Liverpool on 17 December 2019, coming on as a substitute in a match at Aston Villa in the quarter-finals of the EFL Cup.

He played in the FA Cup fourth-round replay against Shrewsbury Town, on 4 February 2020, which Liverpool won 1–0 with the youngest-ever side in their history.

On 24 July 2020, Clarkson signed a long-term contract with Liverpool.

Leighton was named in the starting eleven for a Champions League group stage game against Danish side FC Midtjylland on 9 December 2020.

On 16 August 2021, it was announced that Clarkson would join hometown club Blackburn Rovers on a season-long loan deal. His loan was cut short in January 2022.

Clarkson join Aberdeen on 15 June 2023, on a four-year deal for an undisclosed fee. He scored on his Aberdeen debut in a 4–1 victory over St Mirren.

He joined Blackpool on 2 February 2026, signing a two-and-a-half-year contract, with an option to extend

== International career ==
On 6 September 2021, Clarkson made his debut for the England U20s in a 6–1 victory over Romania U20s at St. George's Park.

== Career statistics ==
=== Club ===
As of end of 2025–26 season

Appearances and goals by club, season and competition
Club	Season	League			National Cup (Note: Includes FA Cup, Scottish Cup)		League Cup (Note: Includes EFL Cup, Scottish League Cup)		Other		Total	
Club	Season	Division	Apps	Goals	Apps	Goals	Apps	Goals	Apps	Goals	Apps	Goals
Liverpool	2019–20	Premier League	0	0	1	0	1	0	0	0	2	0
Liverpool	2020–21	Premier League	0	0	0	0	0	0	1 (Note: Appearance(s) in UEFA Champions League)	0	1	0
Liverpool	2021–22	Premier League	0	0	0	0	0	0	0	0	0	0
Liverpool	2022–23	Premier League	0	0	0	0	0	0	0	0	0	0
Liverpool	Total		0	0	1	0	1	0	1	0	3	0
Liverpool U21	2020–21	–			–		–		3 (Note: Appearance(s) in EFL Trophy)	1	3	1
Blackburn Rovers (loan)	2021–22	Championship	7	0	0	0	0	0	—		7	0
Aberdeen (loan)	2022–23	Scottish Premiership	34	5	1	0	3	1	—		38	6
Aberdeen	2023–24	Scottish Premiership	36	3	4	0	4	1	5 (Note: Two appearances in UEFA Europa League and three appearances in UEFA Europa Conference League)	0	49	4
Aberdeen	2024–25	Scottish Premiership	34	4	5	0	6	3	–		45	7
Aberdeen	2025–26	Scottish Premiership	13	0	1	0	2	1	6 (Note: Two appearances in UEFA Europa League and four appearances in UEFA Conference League)	0	22	1
Aberdeen	Total		83	7	10	0	12	5	11	0	116	12
Blackpool	2025–26	League One	13	0	0	0	0	0	0	0	13	0
Career total			137	12	12	0	16	6	15	1	180	19

== Honours ==
Liverpool Academy

- FA Youth Cup: 2018–19
- Lancashire Senior Cup: 2021-22

Aberdeen

- Scottish Cup: 2024–25
