= Alfie Dorrington =

English footballer (born 2005)

Personal information
- Full name: Alfie Terry Charlie Dorrington
- Date of birth: 20 April 2005 (age 21)
- Place of birth: Enfield, England
- Height: 1.92 m (6 ft 4 in)
- Position: Centre-back

Team information
- Current team: Tottenham Hotspur
- Number: 48

Youth career
- 2013–2016: Hadley Rangers
- 2016–2018: Cockfosters
- 2018–2024: Tottenham Hotspur

Senior career*
Years	Team	Apps	(Gls)
2024–	Tottenham Hotspur	1	(0)
2025	→ Aberdeen (loan)	12	(1)
2025–2026	→ Aberdeen (loan)	6	(0)
2026	→ Salford City (loan)	10	(0)

International career^{‡}
2019	England U15	1	(0)
2021	England U17	3	(0)
2022	England U18	2	(0)
2023–	England U19	7	(0)
- * Club domestic league appearances and goals as of 16:27, 6 March 2026 (UTC) ‡ National team caps and goals as of 21:44, 15 December 2024 (UTC)

Alfie Terry Charlie Dorrington (born 20 April 2005) is an English professional footballer who plays as a centre-back for Premier League club Tottenham Hotspur.

== Club career ==
A youth product of Cockfosters, Dorrington moved to the youth academy of Tottenham Hotspur at the age of 13. On 31 March 2021, he signed a scholarship contract with Tottenham for three years. He was promoted to their U19s, then U21s where he became captain. On 13 June 2023, he signed his first professional contract with Tottenham until 2026. In October 2023, he started training with the senior Tottenham squad.

Dorrington made his first team debut for Tottenham on 15 December 2024, coming on as substitute in the Premier League match away to Southampton.

On 13 January 2025, Dorrington signed on loan for Scottish Premiership side Aberdeen for the remainder of the 2024–25 season. He also signed a new contract with Tottenham until 2029. On 24 May 2025, he won the Scottish Cup with Aberdeen beating Celtic on penalties.

On 19 July 2025, Aberdeen announced that Dorrington was re-joining the club on loan for the 2025–26 season. In January 2026, Tottenham recalled Dorrington from his loan.

On 2 February 2026, Dorrington joined League Two side Salford City on a season long loan.

== International career ==
Dorrington is a youth international for England. He has played up to England U19s.

== Career statistics ==
As of match played 24 May 2025

Appearances and goals by club, season and competition
Club	Season	League			National Cup (Note: Includes Scottish Cup)		League Cup		Europe		Other		Total	
Club	Season	Division	Apps	Goals	Apps	Goals	Apps	Goals	Apps	Goals	Apps	Goals	Apps	Goals
Tottenham Hotspur U21	2022–23	—			—		—		—		2 (Note: Appearance(s) in the EFL Trophy)	0	2	0
Tottenham Hotspur U21	2023–24	—			—		—		—		3	0	3	0
Tottenham Hotspur U21	2024–25	—			—		—		—		1	0	1	0
Tottenham Hotspur U21	Total		0	0	0	0	0	0	0	0	6	0	6	0
Tottenham Hotspur	2024–25	Premier League	1	0	0	0	0	0	0	0	—		1	0
Aberdeen (loan)	2024–25	Scottish Premiership	12	1	4	0	—		—		—		16	1
Aberdeen (loan)	2025–26	Scottish Premiership	6	0	0	0	2	0	6	0	0	0	14	0
Aberdeen (loan)	Total		18	1	4	0	2	0	6	0	0	0	30	1
Career total			19	1	4	0	2	0	6	0	6	0	37	1

== Honours ==
Aberdeen

- Scottish Cup: 2024–25
