= Alexander Jensen =

Danish footballer (born 2001)

Personal information
- Date of birth: 24 August 2001 (age 25)
- Height: 1.80 m (5 ft 11 in)
- Position: Full back

Team information
- Current team: Elfsborg

Youth career
- Midtjylland
- –2020: Vejle

Senior career*
Years	Team	Apps	(Gls)
2020	Vejle	2	(0)
2020–2023	Fredericia	77	(3)
2023–2025	Brommapojkarna	60	(5)
2025–2026	Aberdeen	42	(2)
2026–	Elfsborg	0	(0)
- * Club domestic league appearances and goals as of 8 July 2026

Alexander Jensen (born 24 August 2001) is a Danish footballer who plays as a full-back for Allsvenskan club Elfsborg.

== Career ==
Jensen was a youth player in FC Midtjylland until the U15 team, then Vejle BK, where he also made his senior debut, but did not get a senior contract. He was allowed to move on to FC Fredericia. He came to Fredericia as a midfielder, a "number 8", but was given the chance as a fullback when another player Mikkel Knudsen was injured.

In the winter break of 2023, Jensen was sold to Swedish club IF Brommapojkarna. Jensen made his Allsvenskan debut in April 2023 against Djurgården. He was regarded as a key player in 2023, playing every single minute of the 2023 Allsvenskan with no substitutions. A move to another club was rumoured after the successful 2023 season.

In January 2025 he joined Scottish Premiership club Aberdeen.

On 6 July 2026, Jensen joined Allsvenskan club IF Elfsborg on four-year contract.

== Honours ==
Aberdeen

- Scottish Cup: 2024–25
