= 2021–22 Aberdeen F.C. season =

Aberdeen
2021–22 season
- Chairman: Dave Cormack
- Manager: Stephen Glass (until 13 February); Barry Robson (interim) (from 13 to 19 February); Jim Goodwin (from 19 February)
- Ground: Pittodrie Stadium; Aberdeen, Scotland (Capacity: 20,866)
- Scottish Premiership: 10th
- Scottish Cup: Fifth round
- League Cup: Second round
- UEFA Europa Conference League: Play-off round
- Top goalscorer: League: Lewis Ferguson (11); All: Lewis Ferguson (16)
- Highest home attendance: League: 18,719 vs Dundee United 18 January 2022; Cup: 15,533 vs FK Qarabağ; Conference League; 12 August 2021
- Lowest home attendance: League: 500 vs Dundee 26 December 2021 (Note: Match was limited to 500 fans according to Government guidelines)
Home colours	Away colours

The 2021–22 Aberdeen F.C. season is Aberdeen's 109th season in the top flight of Scottish football and the ninth in the Scottish Premiership. Aberdeen competed in the Scottish Cup, the League Cup and in qualifying for the inaugural season of 2021–22 UEFA Europa Conference League.

== Summary ==
=== May ===
Player-coach Scott Brown arrived from Celtic in July. Scotland International defender Declan Gallagher signed a pre-contract from Motherwell. Striker Jay Emmanuel-Thomas signed from Livingston. Goalkeeper Gary Woods permanently joined from Oldham Athletic after his loan spell last season.

=== June ===
Young winger Teddy Jenks joined from Brighton and Hove Albion on a loan deal, Jack Gurr joined from manager Glass' former club Atlanta United on a free, and American International Christian Ramirez signed from Houston Dynamo for an undisclosed fee.

=== July ===
The club announced all pre-season fixtures were to be played behind closed doors but two matches were cancelled due to COVID-19. Scott Brown was announced as Team Captain with goalkeeper Joe Lewis becoming the Club Captain.

=== August ===
Aberdeen were knocked out of the League Cup by Championship side Raith Rovers. This followed with being knocked out of Europe by Azerbaijan side FK Qarabağ in the Play-off round.

=== September ===
Lewis Ferguson was called up and made his debut for the Scotland national team. The club however suffered a miserable September, losing all three matches in the Premiership. Niall McGinn and Lewis Ferguson were both called up for their respective countries for the October internationals.

=== October ===
Having lost five league games in a row, Glass was under pressure but was eased with wins against both Edinburgh clubs and were unlucky not to win at Ibrox.

=== November ===
On 20 November, the Dons lost to Dundee United, however off the pitch player Funso Ojo was assaulted by a United fan and was sent off for a second bookable offence. The fan was later charged and banned from football. Ojo himself also assaulted a separate United fan after the match. He was later charged for the incident

=== December ===
After three wins, the Dons lost at Easter Road to a Ryan Porteous goal, but during the match he was involved in an incident with Dons forward Ramirez for which he was later given a three match ban. Young full back Jack MacKenzie signed a new contract. The year ended prematurely due to the COVID variant Omicron and the club were forced to play in front of 500 fans against Dundee on Boxing Day as the Dens Park side struggled to field a team.

=== January ===
Midfielder Matty Longstaff returned to his parent club after a disappointing spell with the club. Austin Samuels also returned to his parent club. Promising young American College player Dante Polvara signed a contract for the club. The club signed Dutch forward Vicente Besuijen on a four-and-a-half-year contract.

=== February ===
After a poor run of results including a fifth-round defeat in the Scottish Cup to Motherwell, Stephen Glass left the club on 13 February. He was replaced by Barry Robson as interim manager. The club appointed Jim Goodwin as manager on 19 February Before the match with Dundee United, a statue was unveiled of their most successful manager to date, Alex Ferguson.

=== March ===
It was announced that Team Captain and player-coach Scott Brown had left to pursue his coaching career elsewhere. For the second time during the season The Dons went 10 matches without a League win. Jim Goodwin's first win as manager came in a 3–1 home win against Hibernian on 19 March. The club descended to 10th place in the league.

=== April ===
It was revealed that long-serving defender and former Club Captain Andrew Considine would leave at the end of the season after rejecting the offer of a new deal on reduced terms. Michael Devlin and Jay Emmanuel-Thomas had their contracts terminated and left the club. A home defeat to Ross County consigned Aberdeen to a place in the bottom 6 of the league, failing to qualify for European competition for the first time since 2012–13. The team's first clean sheet in the league since December 2021 came in a 1–0 win against bottom placed Dundee.

=== May ===
Aberdeen secured their place in the Premiership with a draw at Hibernian. Gaining just 2 points from a possible 9 in the last month of the season, the club finished the league in 10th place. Andy Considine made his final appearance for The Dons at home to St Mirren in the season finale. Dylan McGeouch, Funso Ojo and Michael Ruth left the club on conclusion of their contracts, whilst Adam Montgomery and Teddy Jenks returned to their parent clubs at the end of their loan.

== Results & fixtures ==
Win Draw Loss Postponed

=== Pre-season ===
1 July 2021 Friendly	Aberdeen	Cancelled	Cove Rangers	Cormack Park

8 July 2021 Friendly	Aberdeen	1–1	Inverness CT	Cormack Park
13:00	Emmanuel-Thomas 31'	Report	Sutherland 22'	Attendance: Behind closed doors

16 July 2021 Friendly	Aberdeen	Cancelled	Reading	Cormack Park
13:30		Report

16 July 2021 Friendly	Aberdeen	0–0	St Johnstone	Cormack Park
13:30		Report		Attendance: Behind closed doors

=== Scottish Premiership ===
1 August 2021 1	Aberdeen	2–0	Dundee United	Pittodrie Stadium
15:00	Hayes 27'; Ramirez 51'	Report		Attendance: 6,305; Referee: Alan Muir

8 August 2021 2	Livingston	1–2	Aberdeen	Almondvale Stadium
15:00	Anderson 35'	Report	Jenks 47'; MacKenzie 90+4'	Attendance: 2,000; Referee: Kevin Clancy

22 August 2021 3	Heart of Midlothian	1–1	Aberdeen	Tynecastle Stadium
15:00	Boyce 56'	Report	Ojo 71'	Attendance: 17,449; Referee: Bobby Madden

29 August 2021 4	Aberdeen	1–1	Ross County	Pittodrie Stadium
15:00	Ramirez 88'	Report	Charles-Cook 33'	Attendance: 14,434; Referee: Nick Walsh

11 September 2021 5	Motherwell	2–0	Aberdeen	Fir Park
15:00	van Veen 26'; Ojala 59'	Report		Attendance: 5,623; Referee: John Beaton

18 September 2021 6	Aberdeen	0–1	St Johnstone	Pittodrie Stadium
15:00		Report	May 84'	Attendance: 13,007; Referee: Bobby Madden

26 September 2021 7	St Mirren	3–2	Aberdeen	St Mirren Park
12:00	Ronan 14', 58'; Main 61'	Report	Brown 18'; Ramirez 34'	Attendance: 4,513; Referee: Willie Collum

3 October 2021 8	Aberdeen	1–2	Celtic	Pittodrie Stadium
12:00	Ferguson 56'	Report	Furuhashi 11'; Jota 84'	Attendance: 14,522; Referee: Bobby Madden

16 October 2021 9	Dundee	2–1	Aberdeen	Dens Park
18:00	Griffiths 49'; McCowan 62'	Report	Ramirez 67'	Attendance: 6,878; Referee: Colin Steven

23 October 2021 10	Aberdeen	1–0	Hibernian	Pittodrie Stadium
15:00	Ramirez 27'	Report		Attendance: 9,431; Referee: Greg Aitken

27 October 2021 11	Rangers	2–2	Aberdeen	Ibrox Stadium
19:45	Morelos 20'; Tavernier 81' (pen.)	Report	Ramirez 8'; Brown 16'	Attendance: 49,760; Referee: John Beaton

30 October 2021 12	Aberdeen	2–1	Heart of Midlothian	Pittodrie Stadium
15:00	Watkins 49'; Ferguson 69'	Report	Souttar 45+2' (pen.)	Attendance: 9,736; Referee: Kevin Clancy

6 November 2021 13	Aberdeen	0–2	Motherwell	Pittodrie Stadium
15:00		Report	van Veen 50', 57'	Attendance: 9,666; Referee: Don Robertson

20 November 2021 14	Dundee United	1–0	Aberdeen	Tannadice
15:00	Harkes 80'	Report		Referee: Bobby Madden

28 November 2021 15	Celtic	2–1	Aberdeen	Celtic Park
15:00	Jota 20'; McGregor 60'	Report	Ferguson 33' (pen.)	Referee: Kevin Clancy

1 December 2021 16	Aberdeen	2–0	Livingston	Pittodrie Stadium
19:45	Hedges 23'; Bates 75'	Report		Attendance: 6,295; Referee: Craig Napier

4 December 2021 17	Aberdeen	4–1	St Mirren	Pittodrie Stadium
15:00	Watkins 6', 43'; Ramirez 9', 71'	Report	Tanser 42'	Attendance: 8,002; Referee: Willie Collum

11 December 2021 18	St Johnstone	0–1	Aberdeen	McDiarmid Park
15:00		Report	Jenks 83'	Attendance: 3,791; Referee: Greg Aitken

22 December 2021 19	Hibernian	1–0	Aberdeen	Easter Road
19:45	Porteous 64'	Report		Attendance: 14,314; Referee: Alan Muir

26 December 2021 20	Aberdeen	2–1	Dundee	Pittodrie Stadium
15:00	Hedges 12'; Ferguson 70'	Report	Griffiths 7'	Attendance: 500; Referee: Nick Walsh

18 January 2022 21	Aberdeen	1–1	Rangers	Pittodrie Stadium
19:45	Ferguson 73' (pen.)	Report	Hagi 20'	Attendance: 16,371; Referee: Kevin Clancy

25 January 2022 22	St Mirren	1–0	Aberdeen	St Mirren Park
19:45	Ronan 61'	Report		Attendance: 4,821; Referee: Grant Irvine

1 February 2022 24	Ross County	1–1	Aberdeen	Victoria Park
19:45	Callachan 53'	Report	Hayes 48'	Attendance: 3,343; Referee: Alan Muir

5 February 2022 25	Livingston	2–1	Aberdeen	Almondvale Stadium
15:00	Obileye 8'; Forrest 49'	Report	Ramirez 66'	Attendance: 4,276; Referee: Kevin Clancy

9 February 2022 26	Aberdeen	2–3	Celtic	Pittodrie Stadium
19:45	Ramirez 56'; Ferguson 61'	Report	Jota 17', 62'; O'Riley 20'	Attendance: 15,291; Referee: Willie Collum

15 February 2022 23	Aberdeen	1–1	St Johnstone	Pittodrie Stadium
19:45	Ferguson 71' (pen.)	Report	Hendry 6'	Attendance: 12,973; Referee: Gavin Duncan

19 February 2022 27	Motherwell	1–1	Aberdeen	Fir Park
15:00	O'Hara 68'	Report	Besuijen 34'	Attendance: 5,171; Referee: Nick Walsh

26 February 2022 28	Aberdeen	1–1	Dundee United	Pittodrie Stadium
15:00	Edwards 16' (OG)	Report	McNulty 4' (pen.)	Attendance: 18,719; Referee: David Munro

2 March 2022 29	Heart of Midlothian	2–0	Aberdeen	Tynecastle Park
19:45	Souttar 38'; Kingsley 60'	Report		Attendance: 16,703; Referee: Steven McLean

5 March 2022 30	Rangers	1–0	Aberdeen	Ibrox Stadium
19:45	Roofe 81'	Report		Attendance: 50,010; Referee: John Beaton

19 March 2022 31	Aberdeen	3–1	Hibernian	Pittodrie Stadium
15:00	Ferguson 37' (pen.), 64' (pen.); Besuijen 80'	Report	Ramsay 20' (OG)	Attendance: 15,321; Referee: Alan Muir

2 April 2022 32	Dundee	2–2	Aberdeen	Dens Park
15:00	McGhee 62'; Mullen 86'	Report	Ramsay 41'; McCrorie 81'	Attendance: 7,815; Referee: John Beaton

9 April 2022 33	Aberdeen	0–1	Ross County	Pittodrie Stadium
15:00		Report	Hungbo 86' (pen.)	Attendance: 15,162; Referee: Greg Aitken

23 April 2022 34	Aberdeen	1–2	Livingston	Pittodrie Stadium
15:00	McCrorie (red card) 78'; Ferguson 90' (pen.)	Report	Devlin 41'; Holt 70' (pen.)	Attendance: 12,338; Referee: Grant Irvine

30 April 2022 35	Aberdeen	1–0	Dundee	Pittodrie Stadium
15:00	Ferguson 73' (pen.)	Report		Attendance: 13,747; Referee: William Collum

7 May 2022 36	Hibernian	1–1	Aberdeen	Easter Road
15:00	McGinn 83'	Report	Bates 55'	Referee: Bobby Madden

11 May 2022 37	St Johnstone	1–0	Aberdeen	McDiarmid Park
19:45	Hendry 17'	Report		Attendance: 3,421; Referee: David Munro

15 May 2022 38	Aberdeen	0–0	St Mirren	Pittodrie Stadium
12:00		Report		Attendance: 14,906; Referee: Don Robertson

=== Scottish League Cup ===
- Aberdeen enter the Second Round of the League Cup where they will play Raith Rovers. Stephen Glass made seven changes for the match and subsequently were knocked out.

15 August 2021 Second Round	Raith Rovers	2–1	Aberdeen	Kirkcaldy
12:00	Varian 48'; Zanatta 71'	AFC; BBC	Emmanuel-Thomas 13'	Stadium: Stark's Park; Attendance: 3,297; Referee: Steven McLean
Note: Game televised on Premier Sports.

=== Scottish Cup ===
22 January 2022 Fourth Round	Aberdeen	3–0	Edinburgh City	Pittodrie Stadium
15:00	Hedges 23'; Ramirez 44'; Ferguson 90+2'	Report		Attendance: 9,019; Referee: Alan Muir

12 February 2022 Fifth Round	Motherwell	2–1	Aberdeen	Fir Park
15:00	van Veen 34'; Shields 45+3'	Report	Ramirez 3'	Attendance: 5,892; Referee: Greg Aitken

=== UEFA Europa Conference League ===
Aberdeen qualified by finishing in fourth place in the 2020–21 Scottish Premiership and entered in the second qualifying Round. They knocked out BK Hacken 5–3 on aggregate to enter the third qualifying Round against Breiðablik. They also knocked them out 5–3 on aggregate but lost the play-off round 4–1 on aggregate to Qarabağ.

==== Second qualifying round ====
22 July 2021 First leg	Aberdeen (Scotland)	5–1	(Sweden) BK Häcken	Aberdeen, Scotland
19:45	Considine 28'; Ferguson 44' (pen.), 53'; Ramirez 84'; McLennan 90+3'	UEFA report AFC Report	Jeremejeff 59'	Stadium: Pittodrie Stadium; Attendance: 5,665; Referee: José Luis Munuera (Spain)

29 July 2021 Second leg	BK Häcken (Sweden)	2–0 (3—5 agg.)	(Scotland) Aberdeen	Gothenburg, Sweden
17:30	Olsson 51'; Bengtsson 68'	UEFA report Aberdeen FC Report		Stadium: Hisingen Arena; Attendance: 823; Referee: Ádám Farkas (Hungary)

==== Third qualifying round ====
5 August 2021 First leg	Breiðablik (Iceland)	2–3	(Scotland) Aberdeen	Reykjavík, Iceland
20.00	Eyjólfsson 16'; Vilhjálmsson 43' (pen.)	Report	Ramirez 3', 49'; Ferguson 11'	Stadium: Laugardalsvöllur; Attendance: 1,197; Referee: Ivan Bebek (Croatia)
Note: Game televised on Premier Sports.

12 August 2021 Second leg	Aberdeen (Scotland)	2–1 (5–3 agg.)	(Iceland) Breiðablik	Aberdeen, Scotland
19.45	Hedges 47', 70'	Report	Eyjólfsson 59'	Stadium: Pittodrie Stadium; Attendance: 15,107; Referee: Marco Di Bello (Italy)

==== Play-off round ====
19 August 2021 First leg	Qarabağ FK (Azerbaijan)	1–0	(Scotland) Aberdeen	Baku, Azerbaijan
17.00	Romero 30'	Report		Stadium: Tofig Bahramov Stadium; Attendance: 9,756; Referee: Rade Obrenovic (Slovenia)

26 August 2021 Second leg	Aberdeen (Scotland)	1–3 (1–4 agg.)	(Azerbaijan) Qarabağ FK	Aberdeen, Scotland
19.45	Ferguson 90+2' (pen.)	Report	Bayramov 8'; Kady 18'; Zoubir 72'	Stadium: Pittodrie Stadium; Attendance: 15,533; Referee: Harold Lechner (Austria)

== Squad statistics ==
=== Appearances ===
As of 7 May 2022

No.	Pos	Player	Premiership		Conference League		League Cup		Scottish Cup		Total	
No.	Pos	Player	Apps	Goals	Apps	Goals	Apps	Goals	Apps	Goals	Apps	Goals
1	GK	(England) Joe Lewis	32	0	6	0	1	0	1	0	40	0
2	MF	(Scotland) Ross McCrorie	29	1	6	0	1	0	2	0	38	1
3	DF	(Scotland) Jack MacKenzie	12+6	1	4+2	0	0	0	0+1	0	25	1
4	DF	(Scotland) Andrew Considine	2+1	0	5	1	0	0	0	0	8	1
5	DF	(Scotland) Declan Gallagher	19+1	0	3+2	0	1	0	2	0	28	0
7	FW	(Wales) Marley Watkins	15+5	3	0	0	0	0	0	0	20	3
9	FW	(United States) Christian Ramirez	33+3	10	6	3	0+1	0	2	2	45	15
10	FW	(Netherlands) Vicente Besuijen	13+1	2	0	0	0	0	1	0	15	2
11	DF	(Scotland) Adam Montgomery	3+3	0	0	0	0	0	1	0	7	0
15	MF	(Scotland) Dylan McGeouch	9+6	0	1+1	0	1	0	0	0	18	0
16	MF	(Belgium) Funso Ojo	25+3	1	5+1	0	1	0	2	0	37	1
17	MF	(Republic of Ireland) Jonny Hayes	23+9	2	4+2	0	1	0	2	0	41	2
18	FW	(Scotland) Connor McLennan	5+13	0	0+5	1	1	0	0	0	24	1
19	MF	(Scotland) Lewis Ferguson	34	11	6	4	0+1	0	2	1	43	16
20	MF	(England) Teddy Jenks	7+11	2	1+3	0	1	0	1	0	24	2
21	MF	(United States) Dante Polvara	1+2	0	0	0	0	0	0	0	3	0
22	DF	(Scotland) Calvin Ramsay	20+4	1	6	0	0+1	0	1+1	0	33	1
25	GK	(England) Gary Woods	4	0	0	0	0	0	1	0	5	0
27	DF	(Scotland) David Bates	30+1	2	0	0	0	0	2	0	33	2
28	FW	(Scotland) Michael Ruth	0+2	0	0	0	0	0	0	0	2	0
29	DF	(Scotland) Connor Barron	11	0	0	0	0	0	0+2	0	13	0
33	FW	(Northern Ireland) Matty Kennedy	3+3	0	0	0	0	0	0+1	0	7	0
Players who left the club during the season
6	DF	(Scotland) Michael Devlin	0	0	0	0	0	0	0	0	0	0
8	MF	(Scotland) Scott Brown (c)	23+1	2	6	0	0+1	0	2	0	33	2
14	FW	(England) Jay Emmanuel-Thomas	8+7	0	4+2	0	1	1	1+1	0	24	1
10	MF	(Northern Ireland) Niall McGinn	1+8	0	0+1	0	1	0	0	0	11	0
11	MF	(Wales) Ryan Hedges	16	2	3+1	2	0+1	0	1	1	22	5
21	DF	(England) Jack Gurr	3+1	0	0+3	0	1	0	0	0	8	0
23	FW	(England) Austin Samuels	3+5	0	0	0	0	0	0	0	8	0
24	MF	(Scotland) Dean Campbell	7+5	0	0+1	0	0	0	0	0	13	0
31	DF	(Malawi) Kieran Ngwenya	0	0	0	0	0	0	0	0	0	0
35	DF	(England) Mason Hancock	0	0	0	0	0	0	0	0	0	0
44	MF	(England) Matty Longstaff	5	0	0	0	0	0	0	0	5	0

=== Goalscorers ===
As of 7 May 2022

Ranking	Nation	Number	Name	Scottish Premiership	Conference League	League Cup	Scottish Cup	Total
1	(Scotland)	19	Lewis Ferguson	11	4	0	1	16
2	(United States)	9	Christian Ramirez	10	3	0	2	15
3	(Wales)	11	Ryan Hedges	2	2	0	1	5
4	(Wales)	7	Marley Watkins	3	0	0	0	3
5	(Scotland)	8	Scott Brown	2	0	0	0	2
5	(Scotland)	27	David Bates	2	0	0	0	2
5	(England)	20	Teddy Jenks	2	0	0	0	2
5	(Republic of Ireland)	17	Jonny Hayes	2	0	0	0	2
5	(Netherlands)	10	Vicente Besuijen	2	0	0	0	2
6	(Scotland)	4	Andrew Considine	0	1	0	0	1
6	(Scotland)	18	Connor McLennan	0	1	0	0	1
6	(Scotland)	2	Ross McCrorie	1	0	0	0	1
6	(Scotland)	3	Jack MacKenzie	1	0	0	0	1
6	(Scotland)	22	Calvin Ramsay	1	0	0	0	1
6	(England)	14	Jay Emmanuel-Thomas	0	0	1	0	1
6	(Belgium)	16	Funso Ojo	1	0	0	0	1
6	TOTALS			40	11	1	4	56

== Team statistics ==
=== League table ===
Pos	Team	Pld	W	D	L	GF	GA	GD	Pts	Qualification or relegation (Note: Teams play each other three times (33 matches), before the league is split into two groups (the top six and the bottom six).)
8	Hibernian	38	11	12	15	38	42	−4	45	
9	St Mirren	38	10	14	14	33	51	−18	44	
10	Aberdeen	38	10	11	17	41	46	−5	41	
11	St Johnstone (O)	38	8	11	19	24	51	−27	35	Qualification for the Premiership play-off final
12	Dundee (R)	38	6	11	21	34	64	−30	29	Relegation to Championship

Rules for classification: 1) Points; 2) Goal difference; 3) Goals scored; 4) Head-to-head points; 5) Head-to-Head goal difference; 6) Play-off (only if deciding champion, UEFA competitions qualification, second stage group allocation or relegation).
(O) Play-off winners; (R) Relegated

=== Results by round ===
Round	1	2	3	4	5	6	7	8	9	10	11	12	13	14	15	16	17	18	19	20	21	22	23	24	25	26	27	28	29	30	31	32	33	34	35	36	37	38
Ground	H	A	A	H	A	H	A	H	A	H	A	H	H	A	A	H	H	A	A	H	H	A	A	A	H	H	A	H	A	A	H	A	H	H	H	A	A	H
Result	W	W	D	D	L	L	L	L	L	W	D	W	L	L	L	W	W	W	L	W	D	L	D	L	L	D	D	D	L	L	W	D	L	L	W	D	L	D
Position	2	2	2	4	6	7	7	9	9	8	8	6	7	8	8	7	6	6	7	6	6	6	6	7	9	8	8	9	10	10	10	9	9	9	9	10	10	10

Updated to match(es) played on 13 May 2022. Source:
A = Away; H = Home; W = Win; D = Draw; L = Loss

== Transfers ==
=== Players in ===
Date	Pos	Player	From	Fee
21 June 2021	DF	(England) Jack Gurr	(United States) Atlanta United	Free
28 June 2021	FW	(United States) Christian Ramirez	(United States) Houston Dynamo	£180,000
1 July 2021	MF	(Scotland) Scott Brown	(Scotland) Celtic	Free
1 July 2021	FW	(England) Jay Emmanuel-Thomas	(Scotland) Livingston	Free
1 July 2021	DF	(Scotland) Declan Gallagher	(Scotland) Motherwell	Free
1 July 2021	GK	(England) Gary Woods	(England) Oldham Athletic	Free
26 August 2021	FW	(Wales) Marley Watkins	(Wales) Cardiff City	Free
29 August 2021	DF	(Scotland) David Bates	(Germany) Hamburg	Undisclosed
8 January 2022	MF	(United States) Dante Polvara	(United States) Georgetown Hoyas	Free
24 January 2022	FW	(Netherlands) Vicente Besuijen	(Netherlands) ADO Den Haag	Undisclosed
12 February 2022	GK	(Scotland) Craig Samson	(Scotland) Hibernian	Free

=== Players out ===
Date	Pos	Player	To	Fee
17 May 2021	DF	(Wales) Ash Taylor	(England) Walsall	Free
17 May 2021	DF	(Republic of Ireland) Tommie Hoban	(England) Crewe Alexandra	Free
17 May 2021	DF	(Jamaica) Greg Leigh	(England) Morecambe	Free
1 July 2021	FW	(Scotland) Bruce Anderson	(Scotland) Livingston	Free
27 July 2021	DF	(England) Shay Logan	(Scotland) Cove Rangers	Free
5 August 2021	MF	(Finland) Miko Virtanen	(Scotland) Hamilton Academical	Free
19 November 2021	MF	(Scotland) Ethan Ross	(Scotland) Raith Rovers	Free
19 January 2022	DF	(England) Jack Gurr	(United States) Sacramento Republic	Free
24 January 2022	FW	(Northern Ireland) Niall McGinn	(Scotland) Dundee	Free
30 January 2022	MF	(England) Ryan Hedges	(England) Blackburn Rovers	Undisclosed
8 April 2022	DF	(Scotland) Michael Devlin		Released
12 April 2022	FW	(England) Jay Emmanuel-Thomas	(India) Jamshedpur	Free

=== Loans in ===
Date	Pos	Player	From	Fee
14 June 2021	MF	(England) Teddy Jenks	(England) Brighton & Hove Albion	Loan
23 August 2021	FW	(England) Austin Samuels	(England) Wolverhampton Wanderers	Loan
27 August 2021	MF	(England) Matty Longstaff	(England) Newcastle United	Loan
31 January 2022	DF	(Scotland) Adam Montgomery	(Scotland) Celtic	Loan

=== Loans out ===
Date	Pos	Player	From	Fee
24 June 2021	MF	(Scotland) Mark Gallagher	(Scotland) Forfar Athletic	Loan
13 July 2021	MF	(Scotland) Jack Milne	(Scotland) Brechin City	Loan
15 July 2021	MF	(Scotland) Tyler Mykyta	(Scotland) Formartine United	Loan
22 July 2021	MF	(Scotland) Kevin Hanratty	(Scotland) Formartine United	January Loan
3 August 2021	MF	(Scotland) Connor Barron	(Scotland) Kelty Hearts	January Loan
6 September 2021	FW	(Scotland) Michael Ruth	(Scotland) Falkirk	Loan
16 September 2021	DF	(Malawi) Kieran Ngwenya	(Scotland) Kelty Hearts	Loan
25 September 2021	GK	(Scotland) Tom Ritchie	(Scotland) Huntly	Loan
28 September 2021	FW	(Scotland) Ryan Duncan	(Scotland) Peterhead	January Loan
3 January 2022	DF	(Scotland) Evan Towler	(Scotland) Elgin City	Loan
7 January 2022	DF	(England) Mason Hancock	(Scotland) Stirling Albion	Loan
12 January 2022	MF	(Scotland) Kevin Hanratty	(Scotland) Elgin City	Loan
3 February 2022	MF	(Scotland) Dean Campbell	(Scotland) Kilmarnock	Loan

== See also ==
- List of Aberdeen F.C. seasons
