= 2022–23 Aberdeen F.C. season =

Aberdeen
2022–23 season
- Chairman: Dave Cormack
- Manager: Jim Goodwin (until 28 January); Barry Robson (interim from 29 January) (permanent from 1 May)
- Ground: Pittodrie Stadium; Aberdeen, Scotland (Capacity: 20,866)
- Scottish Premiership: 3rd
- Scottish Cup: Fourth round
- League Cup: Semi-finals
- Top goalscorer: League: Bojan Miovski; Luis Lopes (16 each); All: Bojan Miovski; Luis Lopes (18 each)
- Highest home attendance: League: 18,666 vs Rangers 23 April 2023; Cup: 9,323 vs Partick Thistle; League Cup; 19 October 2022
- Lowest home attendance: League: 13,014 vs St Mirren 1 February 2023; Cup: 7,189 vs Dumbarton; League Cup; 13 July 2022
- Average home league attendance: 13,283
| Home colours | Away colours |

The 2022–23 Aberdeen F.C. season was Aberdeen's 110th season in the top flight of Scottish football and its tenth in the Scottish Premiership. Aberdeen also competed in the League Cup and the Scottish Cup.

== Summary ==
=== May ===
Jim Goodwin began the season as manager. For the first time since its reintroduction, Aberdeen entered the group stages of the League Cup. They were drawn in Group A to face Raith Rovers, Peterhead, Dumbarton and Stirling Albion.

=== June ===
Aberdeen spent a week at a Spanish resort for a pre-season training camp. On 19 June, Calvin Ramsay was sold to Liverpool for an initial fee of £4.2 million, with £2.5 million add-ons and a 17.5% sell on fee which became a new club-record sale. June proved to be the start of a busy summer for new arrivals too. Albanian international midfielder Ylber Ramadani and Macedonian striker Bojan Miovski both joined the Dons from Hungarian Premier League side MTK Budapest for fees in the region of £100,000 and £535,000 respectively. Jim Goodwin bolstered the defence by signing right back Jayden Richardson from Nottingham Forest and landing Liam Scales on a season-long loan from Scottish champions Celtic.

=== July ===
On 8 July, manager Jim Goodwin announced new signing Anthony Stewart would serve as the club's captain, taking over from Joe Lewis, with Ross McCrorie serving as vice captain. On 9 July, former player Davie Robb died at the age of 74. On 12 July, Lewis Ferguson signed for Serie A side Bologna for a reported fee of £3 million. Aberdeen topped Group A in the Scottish League Cup winning all four games against Raith Rovers, Peterhead, Dumbarton and Stirling Albion. The Dons qualified as a seeded team in the second round and were drawn away to Scottish League Two side Annan Athletic. On the opening day of the 2022–23 season Aberdeen lost 2–0 away to reigning league champions Celtic in Glasgow.

=== August ===
On 6 August, Aberdeen recorded their first league win of the campaign beating St Mirren 4–1. On the same day Leighton Clarkson joined on a season-long loan from English side Liverpool and scored on his debut. A defeat at home to Motherwell in Steven Hammell's first game in charge of the Lanarkshire side followed. But wins away to St Johnstone and at home to Livingston lifted Aberdeen to fifth place in the league at the end of August. On 30 August Aberdeen needed extra time to overcome Scottish League Two opponents Annan Athletic in the second round of the Scottish League Cup. The following day Aberdeen were drawn to play Partick Thistle at home in the quarter-finals of the competition. The club announced that Dougie Bell, Russell Anderson and the late Davie Robb would be inducted into the Aberdeen FC Hall of Fame.

=== September ===
On 3 September, Aberdeen drew 1–1 away with Ross County, with Duk put Aberdeen ahead in the 88th minute, but Ross County scored an equaliser after five minutes of injury time. Leighton Clarkson was suspended for two matches, following a challenge on Ross County defender Callum Johnson. The match against Rangers at Pittodrie, scheduled for 10 September, was postponed due to the death of Queen Elizabeth II. Aberdeen's next match was away to Hibernian, on 17 September. Aberdeen took an early lead from a Duk header, but eventually lost 3-1 after Hibernian were awarded a controversial penalty and Liam Scales was sent off for a second yellow card for a foul on Hibernian defender, Ryan Porteous. Scales was suspended for one match. Aberdeen manager, Jim Goodwin accused Porteous of "blatant cheating" during a post-match interview and he was later handed an eight-match touchline ban by the SFA for these comments. No other matches were played in September due to the international break. Bojan Miovski and Ylber Ramadani made appearances for North Macedonia and Albania in the UEFA Nations League while Duk was capped for Cape Verde in a friendly against Bahrain. At the end of the month the club announced that former striker Frank McDougall would be inducted into the Aberdeen FC Hall of Fame.

=== October ===
Aberdeen started the month with a 4–1 win at home against Kilmarnock, on the first visit to Pittodrie of former manager Derek McInnes, since leaving the club in March 2021. On 1 October, former Aberdeen striker Frank McDougall announced that he has been diagnosed with lung cancer. A week later Aberdeen travelled to Tannadice to play bottom of the table Dundee United and lost 4-0 in a fixture which was played at 18:00 instead of 15:00 (BST) at the request of both clubs. On 16 October Aberdeen bounced back from the previous defeat by beating Heart of Midlothian 2-0 thanks to two late goals from Duk and Vicente Besuijen. On 19 October Hayden Coulson scored his first goal for Aberdeen as the Dons swept aside Partick Thistle 4-1 at home to reach the League Cup semi-final. Later that same evening Aberdeen were drawn to face rivals Rangers in the semi-finals at Hampden in the New Year Four days later Aberdeen recorded only their second away league win of the season. Goals from Bojan Miovski and Duk saw the Dons run out 2-1 winners against Motherwell at Fir Park. It was the first weekend of VAR being used in the Scottish Premiership. Miovski's goal had initially been ruled offside, but the decision was overturned by VAR and the goal stood. Aberdeen's final game in October was away to Rangers at Ibrox. Connor Barron opened the scoring, but the Dons ended up losing the match 4–1. On 31 October manager Goodwin had his touchline ban reduced from eight games to three games - with one being served earlier in the month against Dundee United.

=== November ===
VAR made its debut at Pittodrie on 4 November as Aberdeen entertained Hibernian at the slightly unusual time of a Friday night match. VAR was heavily involved in Aberdeen's opening goal as goalkeeper David Marshall was judged to have brought down Duk in the penalty box at the end of the first half. Bojan Miovski missed the penalty, however VAR intervened again after Marshall encroached beyond the goal line and Miovski made no mistake as the spot kick was retaken. The Macedonian striker headed a second, as Ylber Ramadani scored his first goal for the Dons and Leighton Clarkson sealed a 4–1 win. Aberdeen's dismal away form continued in the next match against Livingston - a game which was filled with more VAR incidents. Defender Jack Fitzwater put Livi ahead early then Sean Kelly doubled the lead from the spot after Connor Barron was adjudged to have handled the ball in the box. The Dons were awarded two penalties either side of half-time - Miovski saw his effort saved, but Duk converted a second-half spot kick. Aberdeen lost the game 2–1. On 10 November defender Liam Scales was called up to the Republic of Ireland squad ahead of friendlies against Malta and Norway. Other Dons players called up for November international duty included Albanian midfielder Ramadani for friendlies against Italy and Armenia and Miovski was included in North Macedonia's squad for friendlies against Finland and Azerbaijan. Before the international break, another converted penalty by Miovski took him to the top of the Scottish Premiership scorer charts as Aberdeen saw off Dundee United at Pittodrie on 12 November. The league paused for five weeks due to the 2022 FIFA World Cup taking place in Qatar. The rest of the Aberdeen squad travelled to Atlanta in the USA for a week-long training camp and played a friendly against Atlanta United. On 28 November Aberdeen were drawn in the Fourth round of the Scottish Cup to face West of Scotland Football League side Darvel away in Ayrshire.

=== December ===
Aberdeen returned to league action on 17 December with a home defeat to Celtic - Callum McGregor scored the only goal of the game as the champions dominated Aberdeen in a game where Goodwin was criticised for his ultra defensive tactics. Three days later against rivals Rangers goals from Duk and Leighton Clarkson cancelled out Fashion Sakala's opener, but the Dons squandered the 2–1 lead as Scott Arfield scored two injury time goals to give Rangers all three points. On Christmas Eve, captain Anthony Stewart became the first Aberdeen player to be shown a straight red card as he was sent off in a 3–1 defeat away to St Mirren. Before the New Year Aberdeen slipped to a fourth successive loss going down 2–1 away to Kilmarnock. Midfielder Matty Kennedy scored a stoppage time free-kick which proved to be a mere consolation as the Dons struggled to recover from Scott Robinson and Joe Wright's first half goals.

=== January ===
Aberdeen started the New Year with a goalless draw at home to bottom of the table Ross County. The club confirmed a number of updates to development squad loanees. Mason Hancock was recalled from his spell at Arbroath as a result of a serious knee injury. Kevin Hanratty also returned to Cormack Park after his loan spell with Forfar Athletic ended. Youngster Aaron Reid officially became an Aberdeen player after completing his move from Turriff United and the striker was immediately loaned out to Elgin City F.C. for the remainder of the campaign. Finally, Kieran Ngwenya’s stay at Raith Rovers was extended until the end of the season. On 5 January former captain Graeme Shinnie re-joined the club on a six-month loan deal from English Championship side Wigan Athletic. Hours later, Aberdeen announced the loan signing of Slovak midfielder Patrik Myslovič from Slovak Super Liga club MŠK Žilina. Shinnie made his second Dons debut in win at home to St Johnstone - a brace from Duk sealed the 2–0 victory and kept Aberdeen fourth in the table. On 11 January, youngster Evan Towler was recalled from his loan at Scottish Championship side Cove Rangers and was immediately sent out on loan to Elgin City until the end of the season. Aberdeen travelled to Hampden to take on Rangers in the Viaplay League Cup semi-final. Bojan Miovski scored just before half-time to give Aberdeen the lead, but former captain Ryan Jack equalised and sent the tie into extra time. Kemar Roofe scored the winner for Rangers as Aberdeen finished the game with ten men. Current captain Anthony Stewart received his second straight red card of the season for a reckless tackle on Fashion Sakala. Pressure on Jim Goodwin's tenure as Aberdeen manager reached now levels as the Dons slumped to a 5-0 defeat to Heart of Midlothian at Tynecastle on 18 January, but worse was to come. In what has since been regarded as one of the - if not the - greatest shocks in Scottish Cup history, Aberdeen lost 1-0 away to West of Scotland Football League junior side Darvel in a game which was broadcast on BBC Scotland. The club waited nearly 48 hours after the result to release a statement backing Goodwin - but raising expectations for an "immediate response" from the management and players to turn results around. Goodwin's short reign came to an end on 28 January as Aberdeen suffered another humiliating defeat in Edinburgh. Josh Campbell scored a hat-trick in a thumping 6-0 win for Hibernian - a game which saw Liam Scales sent off for a second time at Easter Road. Nineteen minutes after the final whistle Goodwin was formally relived of his duties and chairman Dave Cormack gave an emotional interview to journalists vowing to put things right. On 29 January former player Barry Robson was put in interim charge of the first team as the club appointed veteran English coach Scott Agnew to help him. On the same day Watford defender Mattie Pollock signed on loan for the rest of the season. On transfer deadline day Aberdeen bolstered their goalkeeping options by signing Jay Gorter from Dutch giants Ajax and the club also landed the signature of experienced centre back Angus MacDonald on a free transfer following his release from Swindon Town in the EFL League Two. Blackburn Rovers winger Dilan Markanday also signed on loan until the end of the season. In the opposite direction, captain Anthony Stewart sealed a loan move to EFL League One side MK Dons and winger Vicente Besuijen joined Eredivisie side Excelsior Rotterdam also until the end of the season but with an option to buy.

=== February ===
Ahead of his first game as interim manager against St. Mirren on 1 February, Barry Robson handed the captaincy to Graeme Shinnie. Debuts were also handed to three signings - Angus MacDonald, Dilan Markanday and Mattie Pollock - who joined the Dons on transfer deadline day. However, within the opening spells of the game Aberdeen were reduced to ten men following a VAR check after Ross McCrorie was adjudged to have elbowed Charles Dunne. Former Dons Curtis Main and Declan Gallagher scored as the visitors ran out 3-1 winners. But, Robson did get a win under his belt at home to struggling Motherwell four days later. Dutch goalkeeper Jay Gorter was given his debut as Duk headed the opener in the first half and Bojan Miovski netted a brace in the second half to give Aberdeen the win. Aberdeen were defeated 4-0 away to Celtic, which was followed by a 1-0 win at Pittodrie against Livingston, which saw Aberdeen moving back into the top 6, overtaking Livingston on goals scored but with the same goal difference.

=== March ===
Aberdeen only played two matches in March, due to a break for the Scottish Cup quarter finals and the international break. Aberdeen enjoyed a run of good form under caretaker manager Barry Robson, with a 3-1 away victory against Dundee United, and a 3-0 win at Pittodrie against Heart of Midlothian, which saw Mattie Pollock scoring his first goal for the club. Aberdeen moved up to fourth position in the league table, and Barry Robson won the award for SPFL Premiership Manager of the Month, while Duk won the award for SPFL Premiership Player of the Month. The international break saw a number of Aberdeen players appearing for their countries, including Duk for Cape Verde, Ylber Ramadani for Albania, and Bojan Miovski who scored a goal in a 1-0 win for North Macedonia over the Faroe Islands.

=== April ===
Aberdeen moved to within one point of third-placed Heart of Midlothian, with a 1-0 away win at St Johnstone, during which former Dons defender Andy Considine was sent off. Graeme Shinnie was also sent off during the game for a second yellow card. The only goal of the match came from a header from Angus MacDonald which was initially saved, but then deflected in, by St Johnstone goalkeeper Remi Matthews. The club announced that as part of celebrations in May for the 40th Anniversary of winning the 1983 UEFA Cup Winner's Cup, a number of club staff who did not receive a medal at the time would receive a medal, including former manager Sir Alex Ferguson, his assistant Archie Knox, former player Dougie Bell who missed the final through injury, as well as the families of former club chairman Richard Donald, vice-chairman Chris Anderson, and former kit manager Teddy Scott. Aberdeen secured a place in the top 6 and moved up to third position in the table, with a 2-0 win over Kilmarnock at Pittodrie which saw Duk scoring after only 15 seconds and then scoring another in the second half. Aberdeen won their sixth consecutive match, in a 1-0 away victory at Ross County, with Duk scoring the only goal of the match and Bojan Miovski having a goal disallowed for offside by VAR. This was the first time Aberdeen had managed six consecutive wins since the start of the 2015-16 season. Graeme Shinnie was sent off for the second time in consecutive appearances for Aberdeen. The club appealed the red card decision but Shinnie's suspension was increased to four matches, a decision which was described in a statement by the club as "ridiculously harsh and unnecessary". Aberdeen played their 5000th competitive match, with a 2-0 win over Rangers at Pittodrie, in which Liam Scales scored his first goal for the club and Bojan Miovski also scored. Barry Robson won the SPFL Premiership Manager of the Month for the second month in a row, having overseen Aberdeen winning all four league matches in April without conceding any goals.

=== May ===
On 1 May 2023, Aberdeen FC announced that caretaker manager Barry Robson and his assistant Steve Agnew had agreed to take on the positions on a permanent basis, on a contract until the end of the 2024-25 season. On 4 May, the club held its annual awards ceremony at the P&J Live Arena. Duk won the awards for Player of the Year and Goal of the Season for his back heel goal scored in the away match against Dundee United in March. Leighton Clarkson won the Young Player of the Year award, and Alfie Bavidge won Development Player of the Year. Aberdeen's run of 7 consecutive winning matches, the club's longest since 2015-16, came to an end with a 1-0 defeat away to Rangers. The 40th anniversary of the 1983 European Cup Winner's Cup win in Gothenburg was celebrated, with the Gothenburg Greats and the club being awarded the honour of the Freedom of the City of Aberdeen by the city council. Aberdeen went into the penultimate round of matches in third place two points clear of Heart of Midlothian, following a goalless draw with Hibernian at Pittodrie and a 2-1 away defeat to Heart of Midlothian. Aberdeen secured third place, with a 3-0 victory over St Mirren at Pittodrie, which saw Graeme Shinnie scoring twice on his return following a four match suspension. The season ended with a heavy 5-0 away defeat to Celtic. Aberdeen were assured a place in Group Stage European football for the first time since 2007-08, with entry into the 2023-24 Europa League play-off round, following Celtic's win over Inverness Caledonian Thistle in the Scottish Cup final.

== Results & fixtures ==
Win Draw Loss Postponed

=== Pre-season ===
| 25 June 2022 Friendly | Buckie Thistle | 1–2 | Aberdeen | Buckie |
| 15:00 | Barry 49' | Report | Ramirez 65' (pen.); Kennedy 88' | Stadium: Victoria Park; Attendance: ~2,000 |
Note: Graeme Stewart Testimonial

| 1 July 2022 Friendly | St Johnstone | 1–1 | Aberdeen | San Pedro del Pinatar |
| 12:00 | Bair | Report | Miovski | Stadium: Pinatar Arena; Attendance: 0 |

| 6 July 2022 Friendly | Brechin City | 1–7 | Aberdeen | Brechin |
| 19:45 | McGrath 64' (pen.) | | Ramirez 19'; Besuijen 23', 36'; Kennedy 53'; Hayes 54'; Harvey 67'; Watkins 80' | Stadium: Glebe Park; Attendance: 2,034 |

=== Scottish Premiership ===
| 31 July 2022 1 | Celtic | 2–0 | Aberdeen | Glasgow |
| 16:30 | Welsh 3'; Jota 75' | Report | | Stadium: Celtic Park; Attendance: 58,824; Referee: Nick Walsh |
Note: Game televised on Sky Sports

| 6 August 2022 2 | Aberdeen | 4–1 | St Mirren | Aberdeen |
| 15:00 | Miovski 24' (pen.), 37'; Clarkson 44'; Duk 87' | Report | Ayunga 53' (pen.) | Stadium: Pittodrie; Attendance: 14,420; Referee: Alan Muir |

| 13 August 2022 3 | Aberdeen | 2–3 | Motherwell | Aberdeen |
| 15:00 | Miovski 42'; Hayes 47' | Report | Spittal 20'; Slattery 52' van Veen 55' | Stadium: Pittodrie; Attendance: 14,714; Referee: Chris Graham |

| 20 August 2022 4 | St Johnstone | 0–1 | Aberdeen | Perth |
| 15:00 | | Report | Clarkson 56' | Stadium: McDiarmid Park; Attendance: 5,871; Referee: Craig Napier |

| 27 August 2022 5 | Aberdeen | 5–0 | Livingston | Aberdeen |
| 15:00 | Miovski 41' (pen.), 63'; McCrorie 58'; Besuijen 62' (pen.); Duncan 86' | Report | | Stadium: Pittodrie; Attendance: 13,739; Referee: Colin Steven |

| 3 September 2022 6 | Ross County | 1–1 | Aberdeen | Dingwall |
| 15:00 | Akio 90+5' | Report | Duk 88' | Stadium: Victoria Park; Attendance: 5,210; Referee: Kevin Clancy |

| 17 September 2022 7 | Hibernian | 3–1 | Aberdeen | Edinburgh |
| 15:00 | Boyle 45+4' (pen.); Campbell 62', 73' | Report | Duk 4' | Stadium: Easter Road; Attendance: 17,292; Referee: David Dickinson |

| 1 October 2022 8 | Aberdeen | 4–1 | Kilmarnock | Aberdeen |
| 15:00 | Besuijen 22'; Miovski 24' (pen.), 45'; Stewart 63' | Report | Taylor 27' | Stadium: Pittodrie; Attendance: 16,348; Referee: Kevin Clancy |

| 8 October 2022 9 | Dundee United | 4–0 | Aberdeen | Dundee |
| 18:00 | Behich 41'; Watt 45'; McGrath 73' (pen.); McCrorie 82' (o.g.) | Report | | Stadium: Tannadice; Attendance: 11,010; Referee: Willie Collum |

| 16 October 2022 10 | Aberdeen | 2–0 | Heart of Midlothian | Aberdeen |
| 15:00 | Duk 74'; Besuijen 79' | Report | | Stadium: Pittodrie; Attendance: 14,711; Referee: Don Robertson |

| 22 October 2022 11 | Motherwell | 1–2 | Aberdeen | Motherwell |
| 15:00 | McKinstry 55' | Report | Miovski 7'; Duk 69' | Stadium: Fir Park; Attendance: 5,486; Referee: Euan Anderson |

| 29 October 2022 12 | Rangers | 4–1 | Aberdeen | Glasgow |
| 15:00 | Čolak 27'; Lundstram 45+2'; Tavernier 51'; Morelos 86' | Report | Barron 21' | Stadium: Ibrox; Attendance: 49,365; Referee: Steven McLean |

| 4 November 2022 13 | Aberdeen | 4–1 | Hibernian | Aberdeen |
| 19:30 | Miovski 45+8' (pen.), 53'; Ramadani 61'; Clarkson 77' | Report | Kukharevych 69' | Stadium: Pittodrie; Attendance: 16,479; Referee: David Munro |

| 8 November 2022 14 | Livingston | 2–1 | Aberdeen | Livingston |
| 19:45 | Fitzwater 7'; Kelly 18' (pen.) | Report | Duk 57' (pen.) | Stadium: Tony Macaroni Arena; Attendance: 2,598; Referee: Nick Walsh |

| 12 November 2022 15 | Aberdeen | 1–0 | Dundee United | Aberdeen |
| 18:00 | Miovski 37' (pen.) | Report | | Stadium: Pittodrie; Attendance: 17,035; Referee: Willie Collum |

Mid-season break for 2022 FIFA World Cup

| 17 December 2022 16 | Aberdeen | 0–1 | Celtic | Aberdeen |
| 12:30 | | Report | McGregor 87' | Stadium: Pittodrie; Attendance: 15,567; Referee: Steven McLean |

| 20 December 2022 17 | Aberdeen | 2–3 | Rangers | Aberdeen |
| 20:00 | Duk 45'; Clarkson 52' | Report | Sakala 12'; Arfield 90+5', 90+7' | Stadium: Pittodrie; Attendance: 18,025; Referee: Willie Collum |
Note: The Match which was originally scheduled for 10 September 2022 was postponed as a mark of respect due to the death of Queen Elizabeth II

| 24 December 2022 18 | St Mirren | 3–1 | Aberdeen | Paisley |
| 12:30 | O'Hara 38' (pen.), 53' (pen.); Kiltie 90+5' | Report | Kennedy 9' | Stadium: St Mirren Park; Attendance: 7,394; Referee: Nick Walsh |

| 28 December 2022 19 | Kilmarnock | 2–1 | Aberdeen | Kilmarnock |
| 19:45 | Robinson 31'; Wright 42' | Report | Kennedy 90+1' | Stadium: Rugby Park; Attendance: 6,171; Referee: Don Robertson |

| 2 January 2023 20 | Aberdeen | 0–0 | Ross County | Aberdeen |
| 15:00 | | Report | | Stadium: Pittodrie; Attendance: 14,356; Referee: Matthew MacDermid |

| 7 January 2023 21 | Aberdeen | 2–0 | St Johnstone | Aberdeen |
| 15:00 | Duk 74', 84' | Report | | Stadium: Pittodrie; Attendance: 14,202; Referee: Euan Anderson |

| 18 January 2023 22 | Heart of Midlothian | 5–0 | Aberdeen | Edinburgh |
| 19:45 | Shinnie 15' (o.g.); Smith 28'; Shankland 40' (pen.); Ginelly 45+1'; Devlin 61' | Report | | Stadium: Tynecastle; Attendance: 18,497; Referee: Willie Collum |

| 28 January 2023 23 | Hibernian | 6–0 | Aberdeen | Edinburgh |
| 15:00 | Campbell 10', 15', 88' (pen.); Youan 45'; Nisbet 73'; Fish 90+1' | Report | | Stadium: Easter Road; Attendance: 16,671; Referee: Craig Napier |

| 1 February 2023 24 | Aberdeen | 1–3 | St Mirren | Aberdeen |
| 19:45 | Miovski 73' (pen.) | Report | Main 57' 81'; Gallagher 90+1' | Stadium: Pittodrie; Attendance: 13,014; Referee: Grant Irvine |

| 4 February 2023 25 | Aberdeen | 3–1 | Motherwell | Aberdeen |
| 15:00 | Duk 42'; Miovski 64', 69' | Report | van Veen 75' (pen.) | Stadium: Pittodrie; Attendance: 14,271; Referee: Kevin Clancy |

| 18 February 2023 26 | Celtic | 4–0 | Aberdeen | Glasgow |
| 15:00 | McGregor 2'; Hatate 13', 76'; Abada 89' | Report | | Stadium: Celtic Park; Attendance: 59,090; Referee: Willie Collum |

| 25 February 2023 27 | Aberdeen | 1–0 | Livingston | Aberdeen |
| 15:00 | Miovski 44' | Report | | Stadium: Pittodrie; Attendance: 14,091; Referee: David Munro |

| 4 March 2023 28 | Dundee United | 1–3 | Aberdeen | Dundee |
| 18:00 | McGrath 73' (pen.) | Report | Duk 56'; McCrorie 80'; Watkins 83' | Stadium: Tannadice; Attendance: 11,048; Referee: John Beaton |

| 18 March 2023 29 | Aberdeen | 3–0 | Heart of Midlothian | Aberdeen |
| 15:00 | Duk 5', 21'; Pollock 28' | Report | | Stadium: Pittodrie; Attendance: 16,278; Referee: David Dickinson |

| 1 April 2023 30 | St Johnstone | 0–1 | Aberdeen | Perth |
| 15:00 | Considine (red card) 6' | Report | Matthews 30' (o.g.); Shinnie (red card) 90+1' | Stadium: McDiarmid Park; Attendance: 6,001; Referee: Colin Steven |

| 8 April 2023 31 | Aberdeen | 2–0 | Kilmarnock | Aberdeen |
| 15:00 | Duk 1', 59' | Report | | Stadium: Pittodrie; Attendance: 16,248; Referee: Don Robertson |

| 14 April 2023 32 | Ross County | 0–1 | Aberdeen | Dingwall |
| 19:45 | | Report | Duk 17' | Stadium: Victoria Park; Attendance: 6,619; Referee: Euan Anderson |

| 23 April 2023 33 | Aberdeen | 2–0 | Rangers | Aberdeen |
| 16:30 | Scales 48'; Miovski 56' | Report | | Stadium: Pittodrie; Attendance: 18,666; Referee: Nick Walsh |

| 7 May 2023 34 | Rangers | 1–0 | Aberdeen | Glasgow |
| 15:00 | Cantwell 64' | Report | | Stadium: Ibrox; Attendance: 46,961; Referee: John Beaton |

| 13 May 2023 35 | Aberdeen | 0–0 | Hibernian | Aberdeen |
| 15:00 | | Report | | Stadium: Pittodrie; Attendance: 18,620; Referee: Nick Walsh |

| 20 May 2023 36 | Heart of Midlothian | 2–1 | Aberdeen | Edinburgh |
| 12:30 | Ginnelly 43'; Shankland 56' | Report | Pollock 31' | Stadium: Tynecastle; Attendance: 18,661; Referee: Kevin Clancy |

| 24 May 2023 37 | Aberdeen | 3–0 | St Mirren | Aberdeen |
| 19:45 | Clarkson 14'; Shinnie 43', 49' | Report | | Stadium: Pittodrie; Attendance: 16,303; Referee: Don Robertson |

| 27 May 2023 38 | Celtic | 5–0 | Aberdeen | Glasgow |
| 12:30 | Kyogo 27', 32'; Starfelt 78'; Oh 82', 90' | Report | | Stadium: Celtic Park; Attendance: 59,146; Referee: Alan Muir |

=== Scottish League Cup ===
For the first time since its reintroduction, Aberdeen entered the Group Stages of the League Cup. They were drawn in Group A to face Raith Rovers, Peterhead, Dumbarton and Stirling Albion.

==== Group stage ====
| 10 July 2022 1 | Peterhead | 0–2 | Aberdeen | Peterhead |
| 15:00 | | Report | Ramirez 63' (pen.), 74' | Stadium: Balmoor Stadium; Attendance: 3,112; Referee: David Dickinson |
Note: Game televised on Premier Sports

| 13 July 2022 2 | Aberdeen | 2–0 | Dumbarton | Aberdeen |
| 19:45 | McCrorie 36'; Kennedy 57' | Report | | Stadium: Pittodrie Stadium; Attendance: 7,189; Referee: Colin Steven |

| 19 July 2022 3 | Stirling Albion | 0–5 | Aberdeen | Stirling |
| 19:45 | | Report | Besuijen 14', 43'; Ramirez 24'; Kennedy 31'; McCrorie 41' | Stadium: Forthbank Stadium; Attendance: 2,017; Referee: Craig Napier |

| 24 July 2022 4 | Aberdeen | 3–0 | Raith Rovers | Aberdeen |
| 15:00 | Miovski 5' (pen.); McCrorie 39'; Hayes 46' | Report | | Stadium: Pittodrie Stadium; Attendance: 8,875; Referee: David Munro |
Note: Game televised on Premier Sports

==== Knockout phase ====
| 30 August 2022 Second round | Annan Athletic | 1–4 (a.e.t.) | Aberdeen | Annan |
| 19:45 | Swinglehurst 81' | Report | Besuijen 56', 105'; Duk 97'; Clarkson 117' | Stadium: Galabank; Attendance: 1,538; Referee: Steven MacLean |

| 19 October 2022 Quarter-final | Aberdeen | 4–1 | Partick Thistle | Aberdeen |
| 19:45 | Duk 15'; Holt 31' (o.g.); Coulson 34'; Duncan 86' | Report | Brownlie 53' | Stadium: Pittodrie; Attendance: 9,323; Referee: David Munro |

| 15 January 2023 Semi-final | Rangers | 2–1 (a.e.t.) | Aberdeen | Glasgow |
| 15:00 | Jack 61'; Roofe 94' | Report | Miovski 40' | Stadium: Hampden; Attendance: 47,562; Referee: Nick Walsh |
Note: Game televised on Premier Sports

=== Scottish Cup ===
| 23 January 2023 Fourth round | Darvel | 1–0 | Aberdeen | Darvel |
| 19:45 | Kirkpatrick 19' | | | Stadium: Recreation Park; Attendance: 2,200; Referee: David Munro |
Note: Game televised on BBC Scotland

== Squad statistics ==
=== Appearances ===
As of 6 June 2023

| No. | Pos | Player | Premiership | | League Cup | | Scottish Cup | | Total | |
| No. | Pos | Player | Apps | Goals | Apps | Goals | Apps | Goals | Apps | Goals |
|---|---|---|---|---|---|---|---|---|---|---|
| 1 | GK | (England) Joe Lewis | 3 | 0 | 0 | 0 | 1 | 0 | 4 | 0 |
| 2 | MF | (Scotland) Ross McCrorie | 33 | 1 | 7 | 3 | 1 | 0 | 41 | 4 |
| 3 | DF | (Scotland) Jack MacKenzie | 10+8 | 0 | 0 | 0 | 1 | 0 | 19 | 0 |
| 4 | DF | (Republic of Ireland) Liam Scales | 30+1 | 0 | 7 | 0 | 1 | 0 | 39 | 0 |
| 6 | MF | (Scotland) Graeme Shinnie | 13 | 2 | 1 | 0 | 0 | 0 | 14 | 2 |
| 7 | FW | (England) Shayden Morris | 0+13 | 0 | 1+1 | 0 | 0 | 0 | 15 | 0 |
| 8 | MF | (Scotland) Connor Barron | 11+6 | 1 | 0+2 | 0 | 0 | 0 | 19 | 1 |
| 9 | FW | (North Macedonia) Bojan Miovski | 37 | 16 | 4 | 2 | 0+1 | 0 | 42 | 18 |
| 10 | FW | (England) Dilan Markanday | 0+3 | 0 | 0 | 0 | 0 | 0 | 3 | 0 |
| 11 | FW | (Cape Verde) Duk | 29+8 | 16 | 2+3 | 2 | 1 | 0 | 43 | 18 |
| 14 | MF | (Slovakia) Patrik Myslovič | 0+4 | 0 | 0 | 0 | 1 | 0 | 5 | 0 |
| 15 | FW | (Wales) Marley Watkins | 4+22 | 1 | 0+5 | 0 | 0 | 0 | 31 | 1 |
| 16 | MF | (Albania) Ylber Ramadani | 37 | 1 | 6 | 0 | 1 | 0 | 44 | 1 |
| 17 | MF | (Republic of Ireland) Jonny Hayes | 24+6 | 1 | 4+2 | 1 | 0+1 | 0 | 37 | 2 |
| 18 | DF | (England) Mattie Pollock | 15+0 | 1 | 0 | 0 | 0 | 0 | 15 | 1 |
| 19 | GK | (Netherlands) Jay Gorter | 4+0 | 0 | 0 | 0 | 0 | 0 | 4 | 0 |
| 20 | MF | (England) Leighton Clarkson | 32+2 | 5 | 2+1 | 1 | 1 | 0 | 38 | 6 |
| 21 | MF | (United States) Dante Polvara | 1+2 | 0 | 1+2 | 0 | 0 | 0 | 6 | 0 |
| 22 | DF | (England) Hayden Coulson | 19+9 | 0 | 2 | 1 | 1 | 0 | 31 | 1 |
| 23 | MF | (Scotland) Ryan Duncan | 8+15 | 1 | 0+6 | 1 | 1 | 0 | 30 | 2 |
| 24 | GK | (Netherlands) Kelle Roos | 31 | 0 | 7 | 0 | 0 | 0 | 38 | 0 |
| 25 | DF | (England) Jayden Richardson | 16+3 | 0 | 5 | 0 | 0 | 0 | 24 | 0 |
| 27 | DF | (England) Angus MacDonald | 15 | 0 | 0 | 0 | 0 | 0 | 15 | 0 |
| 28 | MF | (Scotland) Jack Milne | 0+1 | 0 | 0+3 | 0 | 0 | 0 | 4 | 0 |
| 33 | FW | (Northern Ireland) Matty Kennedy | 15+6 | 2 | 7 | 2 | 1 | 0 | 29 | 4 |
| 36 | FW | (Scotland) Alfie Bavidge | 0+5 | 0 | 0 | 0 | 0 | 0 | 5 | 0 |
| 37 | FW | (England) Callum Roberts | 0+3 | 0 | 0 | 0 | 0+1 | 0 | 4 | 0 |
| 48 | FW | (Scotland) Liam Harvey | 0 | 0 | 0+1 | 0 | 0 | 0 | 1 | 0 |
Players who left the club during the season
| 5 | DF | (England) Anthony Stewart (c) | 20 | 1 | 7 | 0 | 1 | 0 | 28 | 1 |
| 10 | FW | (Netherlands) Vicente Besuijen | 9+7 | 3 | 6 | 4 | 0+1 | 0 | 23 | 7 |
| 26 | DF | (England) Mason Hancock | 0 | 0 | 4 | 0 | 0 | 0 | 4 | 0 |
| 99 (Note: Christian Ramirez used the No. 9 for 3 matches in the League Cup.) | FW | (United States) Christian Ramirez | 0+7 | 0 | 3+3 | 3 | 0 | 0 | 13 | 3 |

=== Goalscorers ===
As of 24 May 2023

| Ranking | Nation | Number | Name | Scottish Premiership | League Cup | Scottish Cup | Total |
|---|---|---|---|---|---|---|---|
| 1 | (Cape Verde) | 11 | Duk | 16 | 2 | 0 | 18 |
| = | (North Macedonia) | 9 | Bojan Miovski | 16 | 2 | 0 | 18 |
| 3 | (Netherlands) | 10 | Vicente Besuijen | 3 | 4 | 0 | 7 |
| 4 | (England) | 20 | Leighton Clarkson | 5 | 1 | 0 | 6 |
| = | (Scotland) | 2 | Ross McCrorie | 2 | 3 | 0 | 5 |
| 6 | (Northern Ireland) | 33 | Matty Kennedy | 2 | 2 | 0 | 4 |
| 7 | (United States) | 99 | Christian Ramirez | 0 | 3 | 0 | 3 |
| 8 | (Scotland) | 6 | Graeme Shinnie | 2 | 0 | 0 | 2 |
| = | (Republic of Ireland) | 17 | Jonny Hayes | 1 | 1 | 0 | 2 |
| = | (England) | 18 | Mattie Pollock | 2 | 0 | 0 | 2 |
| = | (Scotland) | 23 | Ryan Duncan | 1 | 1 | 0 | 2 |
| 12 | (Scotland) | 8 | Connor Barron | 1 | 0 | 0 | 1 |
| = | (England) | 5 | Anthony Stewart | 1 | 0 | 0 | 1 |
| = | (England) | 22 | Hayden Coulson | 0 | 1 | 0 | 1 |
| = | (Albania) | 16 | Ylber Ramadani | 1 | 0 | 0 | 1 |
| = | (Wales) | 15 | Marley Watkins | 1 | 0 | 0 | 1 |
| = | (Republic of Ireland) | 4 | Liam Scales | 1 | 0 | 0 | 1 |
| 17 | n/a | n/a | Own goals | 1 | 1 | 0 | 2 |
| TOTALS | | | | 56 | 21 | 0 | 77 |

== Team statistics ==
=== League table ===
| Pos | Team | Pld | W | D | L | GF | GA | GD | Pts | Qualification or relegation (Note: Teams play each other three times (33 matches), before the league is split into two groups (the top six and the bottom six).) |
|---|---|---|---|---|---|---|---|---|---|---|
| 1 | Celtic (C) | 38 | 32 | 3 | 3 | 114 | 34 | +80 | 99 | Qualification for the Champions League group stage |
| 2 | Rangers | 38 | 29 | 5 | 4 | 93 | 37 | +56 | 92 | Qualification for the Champions League third qualifying round |
| 3 | Aberdeen | 38 | 18 | 3 | 17 | 56 | 60 | −4 | 57 | Qualification for the Europa League play-off round |
| 4 | Heart of Midlothian | 38 | 15 | 9 | 14 | 63 | 57 | +6 | 54 | Qualification for the Europa Conference League third qualifying round |
| 5 | Hibernian | 38 | 15 | 7 | 16 | 57 | 59 | −2 | 52 | Qualification for the Europa Conference League second qualifying round |

Rules for classification: 1) Points; 2) Goal difference; 3) Goals scored; 4) Head-to-Head points; 5) Head-to-Head goal difference; 6) Play-off (only if deciding champion, UEFA competitions qualification, second stage group allocation or relegation).
(C) Champions

=== Results by round ===
| Round | 1 | 2 | 3 | 4 | 5 | 6 | 7 | 8 | 9 | 10 | 11 | 12 | 13 | 14 | 15 | 16 | 17 | 18 | 19 | 20 | 21 | 22 | 23 | 24 | 25 | 26 | 27 | 28 | 29 | 30 | 31 | 32 | 33 | 34 | 35 | 36 | 37 | 38 |
|---|---|---|---|---|---|---|---|---|---|---|---|---|---|---|---|---|---|---|---|---|---|---|---|---|---|---|---|---|---|---|---|---|---|---|---|---|---|---|
| Ground | A | H | H | A | H | A | A | H | A | H | A | A | H | A | H | H | H | A | A | H | H | A | A | H | H | A | H | A | H | A | H | A | H | A | H | A | H | A |
| Result | L | W | L | W | W | D | L | W | L | W | W | L | W | L | W | L | L | L | L | D | W | L | L | L | W | L | W | W | W | W | W | W | W | L | D | L | W | L |
| Position | 12 | 5 | 7 | 5 | 4 | 3 | 7 | 5 | 6 | 4 | 3 | 4 | 3 | 3 | 3 | 3 | 3 | 3 | 4 | 4 | 4 | 5 | 7 | 7 | 7 | 7 | 6 | 5 | 4 | 4 | 3 | 3 | 3 | 3 | 3 | 3 | 3 | 3 |

Updated to match(es) played on 24 May 2023. Source:
A = Away; H = Home; W = Win; D = Draw; L = Loss

== Transfers ==
=== Players in ===
| Date | Pos | Player | From | Fee |
|---|---|---|---|---|
| 8 June 2022 | MF | (Albania) Ylber Ramadani | (Hungary) MTK Budapest | £100,000 |
| 20 June 2022 | DF | (England) Jayden Richardson | (England) Nottingham Forest | £300,000 |
| 23 June 2022 | FW | (North Macedonia) Bojan Miovski | (Hungary) MTK Budapest | £535,000 |
| 1 July 2022 | DF | (England) Anthony Stewart | (England) Wycombe Wanderers | Free |
| 1 July 2022 | GK | (Netherlands) Kelle Roos | (England) Derby County | Free |
| 15 July 2022 | FW | (Cape Verde) Duk | (Portugal) Benfica | £400,000 |
| 25 July 2022 | FW | (England) Callum Roberts | (England) Notts County | £150,000 |
| 4 August 2022 | FW | (England) Shayden Morris | (England) Fleetwood Town | Undisclosed |
| 31 January 2023 | DF | (England) Angus MacDonald | (England) Swindon Town | Free |

=== Players out ===
| Date | Pos | Player | To | Fee |
|---|---|---|---|---|
| 12 June 2022 | MF | (Scotland) Mark Gallagher | (Scotland) Formartine United | Free |
| 14 June 2022 | FW | (Scotland) Michael Ruth | (Scotland) Queen of the South | Free |
| 16 June 2022 | DF | (Scotland) Andrew Considine | (Scotland) St Johnstone | Free |
| 18 June 2022 | GK | (Scotland) Jamie Shingler | (Scotland) Inverurie Locos | Free |
| 19 June 2022 | DF | (Scotland) Calvin Ramsay | (England) Liverpool | £4,200,000 |
| 24 June 2022 | GK | (England) Gary Woods | (Scotland) Kilmarnock | Free |
| 25 June 2022 | DF | (Republic of Ireland) Luke Turner | (Northern Ireland) Cliftonville | Free |
| 26 June 2022 | DF | (Scotland) Declan Gallagher | (Scotland) St Mirren | Free |
| 28 June 2022 | MF | (Belgium) Funso Ojo | (England) Port Vale | Free |
| 1 July 2022 | MF | (Scotland) Jack MacIver | (Scotland) Formartine United | Free |
| 4 July 2022 | MF | (Scotland) Finn Yeats | (Scotland) Falkirk | Free |
| 12 July 2022 | MF | (Scotland) Lewis Ferguson | (Italy) Bologna | £3,100,000 |
| 22 July 2022 | MF | (Scotland) Tyler Mykyta | (Scotland) Formartine United | Free |
| 1 September 2022 | DF | (Scotland) David Bates | (Belgium) K.V. Mechelen | Free |
| 22 November 2022 | MF | (Scotland) Dylan McGeouch | (England) Forest Green Rovers | Free |
| 19 January 2023 | FW | (United States) Christian Ramirez | (United States) Columbus Crew | Undisclosed |

=== Loans in ===
| Date | Pos | Player | From | Fee |
|---|---|---|---|---|
| 21 June 2022 | DF | (Republic of Ireland) Liam Scales | (Scotland) Celtic | Season Loan |
| 26 July 2022 | DF | (England) Hayden Coulson | (England) Middlesbrough | Season Loan |
| 6 August 2022 | MF | (England) Leighton Clarkson | (England) Liverpool | Season Loan |
| 5 January 2023 | MF | (Scotland) Graeme Shinnie | (England) Wigan Athletic | End-of-season Loan |
| 5 January 2023 | MF | (Slovakia) Patrik Myslovič | (Slovakia) MSK Zilina | End-of-season Loan |
| 29 January 2023 | DF | (England) Mattie Pollock | (England) Watford | End-of-season Loan |
| 31 January 2023 | GK | (Netherlands) Jay Gorter | (Netherlands) Ajax | End-of-season Loan |
| 31 January 2023 | MF | (England) Dilan Markanday | (England) Blackburn Rovers | End-of-season Loan |

=== Loans out ===
| Date | Pos | Player | From | Fee |
|---|---|---|---|---|
| 15 June 2022 | MF | (Scotland) Dean Campbell | (England) Stevenage | Season Loan |
| 28 June 2022 | MF | (Scotland) Kevin Hanratty | (Scotland) Forfar Athletic | Season Loan |
| 5 July 2022 | DF | (Scotland) Evan Towler | (Scotland) Cove Rangers | Season Loan |
| 18 July 2022 | GK | (Scotland) Tom Ritchie | (Scotland) Queen of the South | Season Loan |
| 28 July 2022 | DF | (England) Mason Hancock | (Scotland) Arbroath | Season Loan |
| 28 July 2022 | DF | (Malawi) Kieran Ngwenya | (Scotland) Raith Rovers | Season Loan |
| 1 September 2022 | MF | (Scotland) Connor McLennan | (Scotland) St Johnstone | Season Loan |
| 1 January 2023 | FW | (Scotland) Aaron Reid | (Scotland) Elgin City | End-of-season Loan |
| 11 January 2023 | DF | (Scotland) Evan Towler | (Scotland) Elgin City | End-of-season Loan |
| 31 January 2023 | FW | (Netherlands) Vicente Besuijen | (Netherlands) Excelsior Rotterdam | End-of-season Loan |
| 31 January 2023 | DF | (England) Anthony Stewart | (England) MK Dons | End-of-season Loan |
| 8 March 2023 | MF | (United States) Dante Polvara | (United States) Charleston Battery | End-of-season Loan |

== See also ==
- List of Aberdeen F.C. seasons
