= Duk (footballer) =

Cape Verdean former footballer (born 2000)

Personal information
- Full name: Luís Henriques de Barros Lopes
- Date of birth: 16 February 2000 (age 26)
- Place of birth: Lisbon, Portugal
- Height: 1.75 m (5 ft 9 in)
- Position: Forward

Team information
- Current team: Atlas
- Number: 11

Youth career
- 2009–2010: Montelavarenses
- 2010–2011: Sporting CP
- 2011–2014: Montelavarenses
- 2014–2015: Oeiras
- 2015–2017: Belenenses
- 2017–2020: Benfica

Senior career*
Years	Team	Apps	(Gls)
2020–2022	Benfica B	42	(11)
2022–2025	Aberdeen	90	(28)
2025–2026	Leganés	47	(4)
2026–	Atlas	7	(2)

International career^{‡}
2018	Portugal U18	5	(2)
2018	Portugal U19	7	(2)
2022–	Cape Verde	6	(0)
- * Club domestic league appearances and goals as of 12 September 2026 ‡ National team caps and goals as of 24 November 2023 (UTC)

Luís Henriques de Barros Lopes (Portuguese: [lu.ˈiz ẽ.ˈʀi.kɨʒ dɨ ˈba.ʀuʒ ˈlɔpɨʃ]; born 16 February 2000), commonly known as Duk (Kabuverdianu: [duk]), is a Cape Verdean professional footballer who plays as a forward for Liga MX club Atlas and the Cape Verde national football team.

== Club career ==
Duk represented CF Os Montelavarenses, Sporting CP, Oeiras, Belenenses and Benfica as a youth. He played with the latter's reserve team as a senior, featuring in 42 games across 2 seasons and scoring 11 goals.

In July 2022, Duk signed for Aberdeen on a three-year deal from Benfica for 400k euros. In March 2023, he was named Premiership player of the month.

On 3 February 2025, Duk signed a two-and-a-half-year contract with La Liga side Leganés.

== International career ==
Duk has represented Portugal at Under-18 and U19 level, but made his international debut for Cape Verde in 2022.

== Controversies ==
Before the 2024–25 season, Duk failed to report back to the club for pre-season training. The club subsequently confirmed that Duk was absent without leave and would be proceeding with disciplinary measures against the player.

== Career statistics ==
=== Club ===
As of match played 15 February 2025

Appearances and goals by club, season and competition
Club	Season	League			National cup (Note: Includes Scottish Cup)		League cup (Note: Includes Scottish League Cup)		Other		Total	
Club	Season	Division	Apps	Goals	Apps	Goals	Apps	Goals	Apps	Goals	Apps	Goals
Benfica B	2019–20	Liga Portugal 2	1	0	—		—		—		1	0
Benfica B	2020–21	Liga Portugal 2	21	3	—		—		—		21	3
Benfica B	2021–22	Liga Portugal 2	20	8	—		—		—		20	8
Benfica B	Total		42	11	—		—		—		42	11
Aberdeen	2022–23	Scottish Premiership	37	16	1	0	5	2	—		43	18
Aberdeen	2023–24	Scottish Premiership	34	4	4	0	3	0	8	3	49	7
Aberdeen	2024–25	Scottish Premiership	19	0	1	2	1	0	—		21	2
Aberdeen	Total		90	20	6	2	9	2	8	3	113	27
Leganés	2024–25	La Liga	2	0	—		—		—		2	0
Career total			134	31	6	2	9	2	8	3	156	38

=== International ===
As of match played 16 November 2023

Appearances and goals by national team and year
National team	Year	Apps	Goals
Cape Verde	2022	2	0
Cape Verde	2023	3	0
Total		5	0
