= Ryan Duncan (footballer) =

Scottish footballer

Personal information
- Date of birth: 18 January 2004 (age 22)
- Place of birth: Keig, Scotland
- Height: 1.85 m (6 ft 1 in)
- Position: Midfielder

Team information
- Current team: Inverness Caledonian Thistle

Youth career
- 2013–2020: Aberdeen

Senior career*
Years	Team	Apps	(Gls)
2020–2026	Aberdeen	33	(1)
2021–2022	→ Peterhead (loan)	15	(3)
2024–2025	→ Queen's Park (loan)	31	(2)
2025–2026	→ Ross County (loan)	20	(2)
2026–	Inverness Caledonian Thistle	0	(0)

International career
2019–2020	Scotland U17	3	(0)
- * Club domestic league appearances and goals as of 4 May 2026

Ryan Duncan (born 18 January 2004) is a Scottish professional footballer who plays as a midfielder for Scottish Championship club Inverness Caledonian Thistle. He has previously played for Aberdeen along with loan spells at Peterhead, Queen's Park and Ross County.

== Career statistics ==
match played 1 May 2026

Appearances and goals by club, season and competition
Club	Season	League			National Cup		League Cup		Other		Total	
Club	Season	Division	Apps	Goals	Apps	Goals	Apps	Goals	Apps	Goals	Apps	Goals
Aberdeen	2020-21	Scottish Premiership	1	0	0	0	0	0	0	0	1	0
Aberdeen	2021-22	Scottish Premiership	0	0	0	0	0	0	0	0	0	0
Aberdeen	2022-23	Scottish Premiership	23	1	1	0	5	1	0	0	29	2
Aberdeen	2023-24	Scottish Premiership	9	0	2	0	2	0	6	0	19	0
Aberdeen	Total		33	1	3	0	7	1	6	0	49	2
Peterhead (loan)	2021-22	Scottish League 1	15	3	2	0	0	0	1	0	18	3
Queen's Park (loan)	2024-25	Scottish Championship	31	2	3	0	0	0	5	2	39	4
Ross County (loan)	2025-26	Scottish Championship	20	2	2	0	0	0	0	0	22	2
Inverness Caledonian Thistle	2026-27	Scottish Championship	0	0	0	0	0	0	0	0	0	0
Career total			99	11	11	0	7	1	12	2	128	11

== Honours ==
Queen's Park

- Scottish Challenge Cup runner-up: 2024–25
