= Mason Hancock =

English footballer (born 2003)

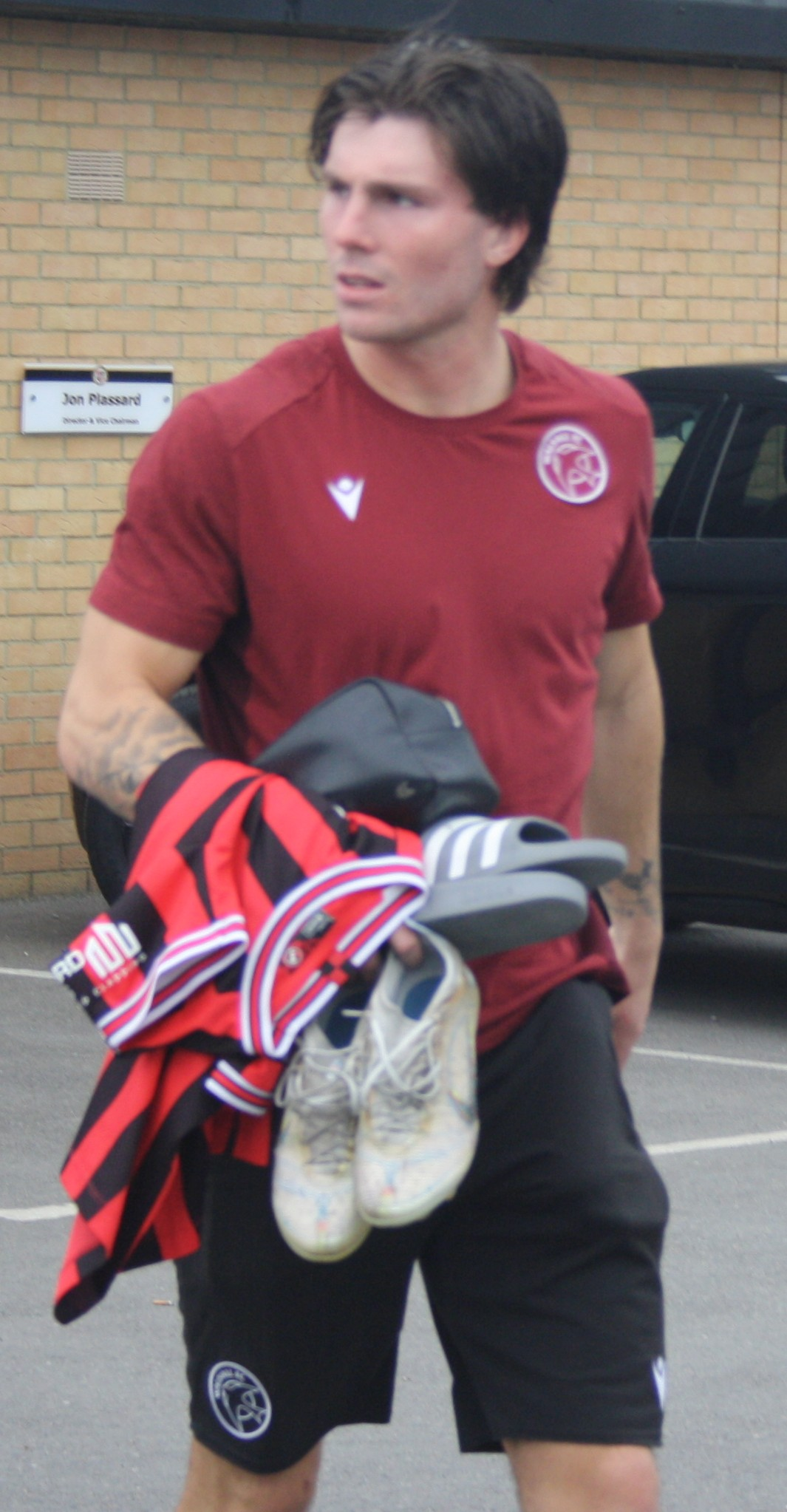
- Hancock in 2026

Personal information
- Full name: Mason Colin Hancock
- Date of birth: 10 February 2003 (age 23)
- Place of birth: Surrey, England
- Height: 1.88 m (6 ft 2 in)
- Position: Defender

Team information
- Current team: Walsall
- Number: 3

Youth career
- 2010–2018: Fulham
- 2018–2019: Oxford United
- 2019–2020: Woking
- 2020–2022: Aberdeen

Senior career*
Years	Team	Apps	(Gls)
2022–2023	Aberdeen	0	(0)
2022	→ Stirling Albion (loan)	13	(0)
2022	→ Arbroath (loan)	11	(0)
2023–2025	Airdrieonians	50	(7)
2025–	Walsall	25	(2)
- * Club domestic league appearances and goals as of 14:03, 24 May 2025 (UTC)

Mason Colin Hancock (born 10 February 2003) is an English professional footballer who plays as a left-back or centre-back for EFL League Two club Walsall. Hancock has previously played for Aberdeen, Stirling Albion, Arbroath and Airdrieonians.

== Career ==
=== Aberdeen ===
Originally starting his career with Fulham, where he spent eight years, Hancock also had spells with Oxford United and Woking, before moving to Scotland to join Aberdeen in 2020. Following his arrival, he quickly progressed through the youth ranks and within the space of a year he was in and around the first-team squad, featuring as an unused substitute in their Scottish Premiership fixture with Heart of Midlothian.

Six months later, Hancock signed a new one-year contract extension, tying him to the club until May 2023. Following this, he was loaned to Scottish League Two side Stirling Albion for the remainder of the season. He went onto feature fourteen times in all competitions.

Ahead of the 2022–23 campaign, Hancock was assigned the number 26 jersey. On 10 July 2022, he made his first-team debut starting in a 2–0 victory over Peterhead in the Scottish League Cup. However he was substituted after 35 minutes after sustaining an injury. On 28 July 2022, he featured four times for Aberdeen in the Scottish League Cup and was sent out on loan to Arbroath for the remainder of the season. After making 13 appearances for Arbroath, Hancock returned to Aberdeen after sustaining a serious knee injury. He left the club in 2023.

=== Airdrieonians ===
Hancock signed for Scottish Championship outfit Airdrieonians in August 2023. Scored his first goal for the club in a 2-1 win v Queen's Park in the Scottish Championship at Hampden on 30 December 2023. Following the 2024-25 season he was offered a renewed contract but declined.

=== Walsall ===
On 17 June 2025, Hancock signed for League Two side Walsall on a two-year contract with an option for another year.

== Career statistics ==
As of match played 21 September 2024

Appearances and goals by club, season and competition
Club	Season	League			National Cup		League Cup		Other		Total	
Club	Season	Division	Apps	Goals	Apps	Goals	Apps	Goals	Apps	Goals	Apps	Goals
Aberdeen U20	2021–22	—			—		—		3 (Note: Appearances in the Scottish Challenge Cup)	0	3	0
Aberdeen	2021–22	Scottish Premiership	0	0	0	0	0	0	0	0	0	0
Aberdeen	2022–23	Scottish Premiership	0	0	0	0	4	0	—		4	0
Aberdeen	Total		0	0	0	0	4	0	0	0	4	0
Stirling Albion (loan)	2021–22	Scottish League Two	13	0	1	0	—		—		14	0
Arbroath (loan)	2022–23	Scottish Championship	11	0	0	0	1	0	1	0	13	0
Airdrieonians	2023–24	Scottish Championship	30	4	3	0	1	0	3	0	37	4
Airdrieonians	2024–25	Scottish Championship	6	0	0	0	5	1	0	0	11	1
Airdrieonians	Total		36	4	3	0	6	1	3	0	48	5
Walsall	2025–26	League Two	18	2	0	0	0	0	1	0	19	2
Walsall	2026–27	League Two	7	0	0	0	2	0	0	0	9	0
Walsall	Total		25	2	0	0	2	0	1	0	28	2
Career total			85	6	4	0	13	1	8	0	110	7
