= Jack MacKenzie (footballer, born 2000) =

Scottish footballer (born 2000)

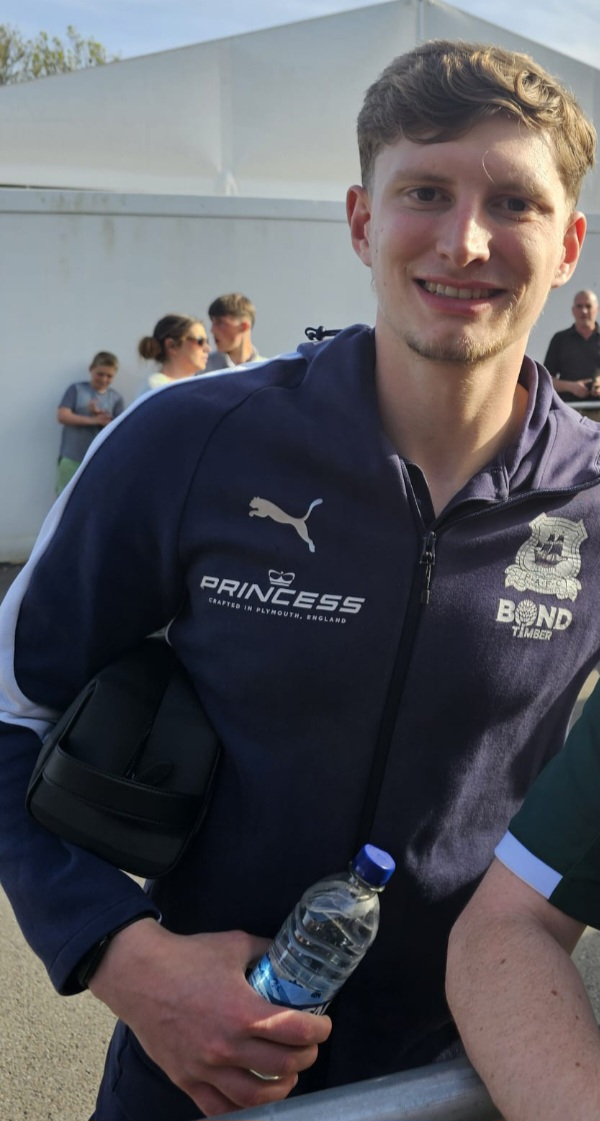
- MacKenzie after a game in 2026.

Personal information
- Full name: Jack Andrew MacKenzie
- Date of birth: 7 April 2000 (age 26)
- Place of birth: Aberdeen, Scotland
- Height: 5 ft 10 in (1.78 m)
- Position: Left-back

Team information
- Current team: Plymouth Argyle
- Number: 3

Youth career
- 2009–2020: Aberdeen

Senior career*
Years	Team	Apps	(Gls)
2020–2025	Aberdeen	96	(2)
2020–2021	→ Forfar Athletic (loan)	10	(0)
2025–	Plymouth Argyle	14	(0)
- * Club domestic league appearances and goals as of 17:03, 24 October 2026 (UTC)

Jack Andrew MacKenzie (born 7 April 2000) is a Scottish professional footballer who plays as left-back for EFL League One club Plymouth Argyle.

== Club career ==
=== Aberdeen ===
MacKenzie joined the Aberdeen youth system aged nine. He was captain of the club's development side and signed a two-year contract in 2019. In March 2020, MacKenzie was due to join Atlanta United 2 on loan, but the move was cancelled due to the COVID-19 pandemic.

In October 2020, MacKenzie joined Scottish League One club Forfar Athletic on loan, going on to make 14 appearances.

MacKenzie made his first team debut for Aberdeen on 20 March 2021, in a Scottish Premiership game against Dundee United under interim manager Paul Sheerin. Following his debut, MacKenzie signed a new two-year contract due to run until 2023.

At the end of the last match of the Premiership season against Dundee United on 17 May 2025, he was struck in the head by a seat thrown from his own club's supporters (aimed at home fans who had invaded the field in celebration at the outcome) and sustained a "serious facial injury". He had recovered sufficiently to appear as a substitute in the 2025 Scottish Cup final a week later, which Aberdeen won on penalties. MacKenzie was released by Aberdeen after the final, following the expiry of his contract.

=== Plymouth Argyle ===
MacKenzie signed a three-year contract with Plymouth Argyle on 30 May 2025. He did not play at all in the first half of the 2025–26 season due to injuries.

== International career ==
Mackenzie received his first international call-up of his career for the senior Scottish national team in October 2024, for Scotland's Nations League fixtures with Croatia and Portugal.

== Career statistics ==
As of 24 October 2026

Appearances and goals by club, season and competition
Club	Season	League			National cup (Note: Includes Scottish Cup, FA Cup)		League cup (Note: Includes Scottish League Cup, EFL Cup)		Other		Total	
Club	Season	Division	Apps	Goals	Apps	Goals	Apps	Goals	Apps	Goals	Apps	Goals
Aberdeen	2020–21	Scottish Premiership	6	0	0	0	0	0	0	0	6	0
Aberdeen	2021–22	Scottish Premiership	20	1	1	0	0	0	6 (Note: Appearances in the UEFA Europa Conference League)	0	27	1
Aberdeen	2022–23	Scottish Premiership	18	0	1	0	0	0	0	0	19	0
Aberdeen	2023–24	Scottish Premiership	27	1	4	0	2	0	5	0	38	1
Aberdeen	2024–25	Scottish Premiership	25	0	2	0	7	1	0	0	34	1
Aberdeen	Total		96	2	8	0	9	1	11	0	124	3
Forfar Athletic (loan)	2020–21	Scottish League One	10	0	1	0	3	0	0	0	14	0
Plymouth Argyle	2025–26	League One	11	0	—		—		1 (Note: Appearance in EFL Trophy)	0	12	0
Plymouth Argyle	2026–27	League One	3	0	0	0	0	0	2	0	5	0
Plymouth Argyle	Total		14	0	0	0	0	0	3	0	17	0
Career total			126	2	9	0	12	0	14	0	155	3

== Honours ==
Aberdeen

- Scottish Cup: 2024–25
