= Ross McCrorie =

Scottish footballer

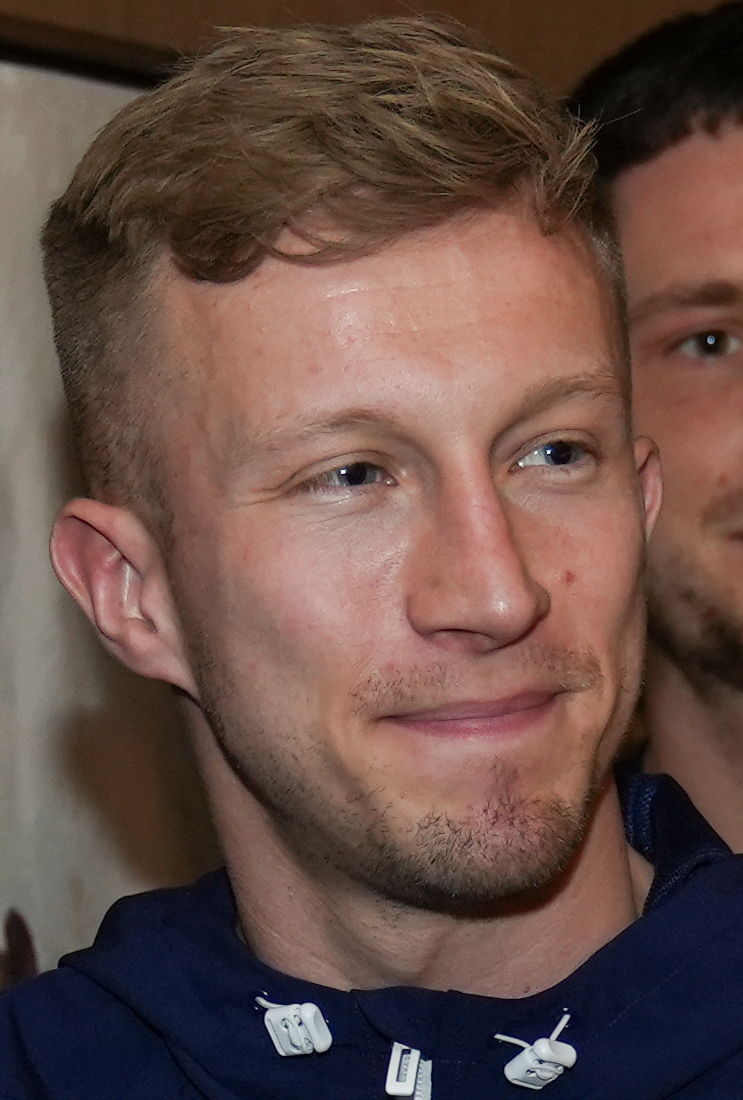
- McCrorie in 2026

Personal information
- Full name: Ross McCrorie
- Date of birth: 18 March 1998 (age 28)
- Place of birth: Dailly, Ayrshire, Scotland
- Height: 1.90 m (6 ft 3 in)
- Positions: Defender; defensive midfielder

Team information
- Current team: Rangers
- Number: 2

Youth career
- 2012–2017: Rangers

Senior career*
Years	Team	Apps	(Gls)
2016–2021	Rangers	41	(2)
2016	→ Ayr United (loan)	15	(2)
2017	→ Dumbarton (loan)	9	(0)
2019–2020	→ Portsmouth (loan)	17	(0)
2020–2021	→ Aberdeen (loan)	19	(1)
2021–2023	Aberdeen	73	(3)
2023–2026	Bristol City	81	(8)
2026–	Rangers	3	(0)

International career^{‡}
2013	Scotland U15	2	(0)
2013–2014	Scotland U16	6	(0)
2014–2015	Scotland U17	9	(1)
2015–2017	Scotland U19	8	(1)
2017–2018	Scotland U20	4	(0)
2016–2020	Scotland U21	18	(1)
2024–	Scotland	2	(0)
Medal record
Scotland
Toulon Tournament
Bronze medal – third place	2017 Toulon	U–20 Competition
- * Club domestic league appearances and goals as of 18:55, 2 May 2026 (UTC) ‡ National team caps and goals as of 02:11, 1 April 2026 (UTC)

Ross McCrorie (born 18 March 1998) is a Scottish professional footballer who plays as a right-back, right wing-back, or defensive midfielder for Scottish Premiership club Rangers and the Scotland national team.

McCrorie has previously played for Ayr United, Dumbarton, Portsmouth, Aberdeen and Bristol City. He captained the Scotland under-21 team, and made his full international debut for Scotland in 2024.

== Club career ==
=== Early careers and loans out ===
McCrorie, alongside his twin brother Robby (a goalkeeper), worked his way through the Rangers youth system, becoming captain of their U20s side. McCrorie joined Scottish League One side Ayr United on loan in February 2016, playing fifteen times and scoring twice as Ayr won promotion.

After signing a new contract in December 2016, at the same time as his brother, he joined his former coach at Rangers, Ian Durrant, at Scottish Championship side Dumbarton on a loan deal until the end of the season.

=== Rangers first breakthrough ===
McCrorie made his debut for the Rangers senior team in September 2017, when he replaced Bruno Alves in a League Cup quarter-final against Partick Thistle at Firhill Stadium, won 3–1 after extra time. Following the match, manager Pedro Caixinha praised McCrorie, stating that he was "going to be the future of this country, not only this club, as a centre-half. We are very glad to have him with us". Later in the same week he made his first start – also his Scottish Premiership debut and maiden experience of the Old Firm derby – against Celtic at Ibrox. Rangers lost the match 2–0, but McCrorie's performance was reported favourably by the press and both Rangers and Celtic fans.

McCrorie scored his first senior goal for Rangers with a header in the first half against Partick Thistle on 4 November 2017 at Ibrox; Rangers won the match 3–0. On 3 December he was deployed as a defensive midfielder in a fixture away to Aberdeen, which his team won to overtake their opponents into second place in the table. On 28 December he signed a new four-year contract. After he scored an important goal in the second visit to Aberdeen in May 2018, McCrorie received praise from both the Pittodrie boss Derek McInnes and the Rangers caretaker manager Jimmy Nicholl for his overall performance and influence in bringing his team back into the match; the player himself dedicated the strike to his dying grandmother.

==== Loan to Portsmouth ====
In July 2019, McCrorie agreed a deal to move to English club Portsmouth on loan for the 2019–20 season; it was reported that Pompey had an option to buy him outright, but this was refuted by Rangers manager Steven Gerrard a few days later. He made his competitive debut for Pompey on 3 August, a 1–0 defeat away at Shrewsbury Town, during which he was sent off in the 81st minute for a late challenge on Shrewsbury's Donald Love.

=== Aberdeen ===
On 17 August 2020, McCrorie joined Aberdeen, initially on a one-year loan, with an obligation to buy for a reported fee of around £350,000. A clause in the deal meant he would not be eligible to play against his 'parent club' during the 2020–21 Scottish Premiership campaign, although he would not return to Rangers before becoming a permanent Aberdeen signing. The deal was made permanent on 1 February 2021, ahead of schedule, as Scott Wright moved in the opposite direction.

=== Bristol City ===
On 6 June 2023, McCrorie joined Bristol City on a three-year deal with the option of a further year, for an undisclosed fee. After an injury lay off, McCrorie made his debut for City in a 2–0 loss away at Preston on 13 January 2024. On 22 May 2026, the club announced it had exercised an option to extend the player's contract to the end of the 2026/27 season.

=== Rangers return ===
On 25 June 2026, McCrorie returned to Rangers on a three-year contract with the option of a further year.

== International career ==
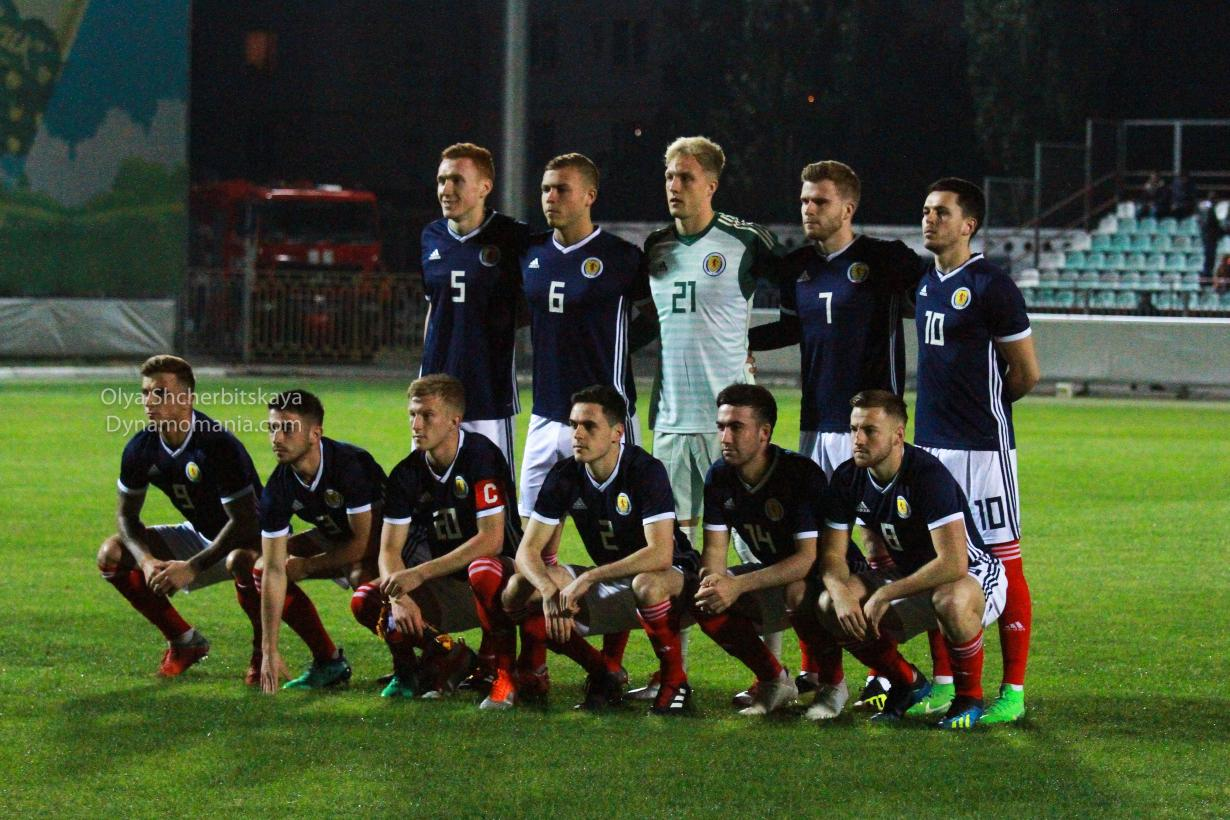
McCrorie (No 20, captain) with Scotland U21s in Ukraine, 2018, alongside twin brother Robby (No 21, goalkeeper)

With his brother Robby, Scotland U16 won the Victory Shield in 2013–14, and were selected for Scotland U17 in the 2015 UEFA European U-17 Championship.

McCrorie was named in the Scotland U19 squad for the elite round of the European Championships in March 2017 alongside Dumbarton teammate Daniel Harvie. He had captained the side in the qualifying phase of the tournament. He also captained the Scotland U21 team on several occasions.

McCrorie was selected for the Scotland under-20 squad in the 2017 Toulon Tournament. The team went on to claim the bronze medal, the nation's first ever medal at the competition.

McCrorie received his first call-up to the senior Scotland squad in October 2020. He was called up again in June 2023 for games against Norway and Georgia.

McCrorie made his Scotland debut on 3 June 2024 in a friendly against Gibraltar. Two years later, he made his second appearance in a 1-0 friendly loss against Ivory Coast.

== Career statistics ==
=== Club ===
As of end of 2025–26 season

Appearances and goals by club, season and competition
Club	Season	League			National cup (Note: Includes Scottish Cup, FA Cup)		League cup (Note: Includes Scottish League Cup, EFL Cup)		Europe		Other		Total	
Club	Season	Division	Apps	Goals	Apps	Goals	Apps	Goals	Apps	Goals	Apps	Goals	Apps	Goals
Rangers U20 (Note: Matches in Scottish Challenge Cup, in which teams from SPFL Development League compete against senior clubs)	2016–17	—									2	0	2	0
Rangers U20	2017–18	—									1	0	1	0
Rangers U20	Total		0	0	0	0	0	0	0	0	3	0	3	0
Rangers	2015–16	Scottish Championship	0	0	0	0	0	0	—		0	0	0	0
Rangers	2016–17	Scottish Premiership	0	0	0	0	0	0	—		—		0	0
Rangers	2017–18	Scottish Premiership	21	2	1	0	2	0	0	0	—		24	2
Rangers	2018–19	Scottish Premiership	20	0	1	0	2	0	8 (Note: Appearances in UEFA Europa League; Soccerbase does not include game in 2018–19 v Maribor (0–0) BBC)	0	—		31	0
Rangers	2019–20	Scottish Premiership	0	0	0	0	0	0	0	0	—		0	0
Rangers	2020–21	Scottish Premiership	0	0	0	0	0	0	0	0	—		0	0
Rangers	Total		41	2	2	0	4	0	8	0	0	0	55	2
Ayr United (loan)	2015–16	Scottish League One	11	2	0	0	0	0	—		4 (Note: Appearances Scottish Championship play-offs)	0	15	2
Dumbarton (loan)	2016–17	Scottish Championship	9	0	0	0	0	0	—		0	0	9	0
Portsmouth (loan)	2019–20	League One	17	0	1	0	2	0	—		3	0	23	0
Aberdeen (loan)	2019–20	Scottish Premiership	—		1 (Note: McCrorie was not with Aberdeen during the 2019–20 season; however, he made one appearance in the 2019–20 Scottish Cup semi-final, which was postponed until October 2020 due to the COVID-19 pandemic)	0	—		—		—		1	0
Aberdeen (loan)	2020–21	Scottish Premiership	19	1	0	0	0	0	3	1	—		22	2
Aberdeen	2020–21	Scottish Premiership	10	0	2	0	0	0	0	0	—		12	0
Aberdeen	2021–22	Scottish Premiership	30	1	2	0	1	0	6 (Note: Appearances in UEFA Europa Conference League)	0	—		39	1
Aberdeen	2022–23	Scottish Premiership	33	2	1	0	7	3	0	0	—		41	5
Aberdeen	Total		92	4	6	0	8	3	9	0	0	0	115	8
Bristol City	2023–24	EFL Championship	19	0	3	0	0	0	—		—		22	0
Bristol City	2024–25	EFL Championship	23	5	1	0	0	0	—		2 (Note: Appearances in EFL Championship play-offs)	0	26	5
Bristol City	2025–26	EFL Championship	39	3	1	0	1	0	—		—		41	3
Bristol City	Total		81	8	5	0	1	0	—		2	0	89	8
Career total			251	16	14	0	15	3	17	1	12	0	309	20

== Honours ==
Ayr United

- Scottish Championship Play-offs: 2015–16

Scotland U16

- Victory Shield: 2013–14
