= Jonny Hayes =

Irish footballer (born 1987)

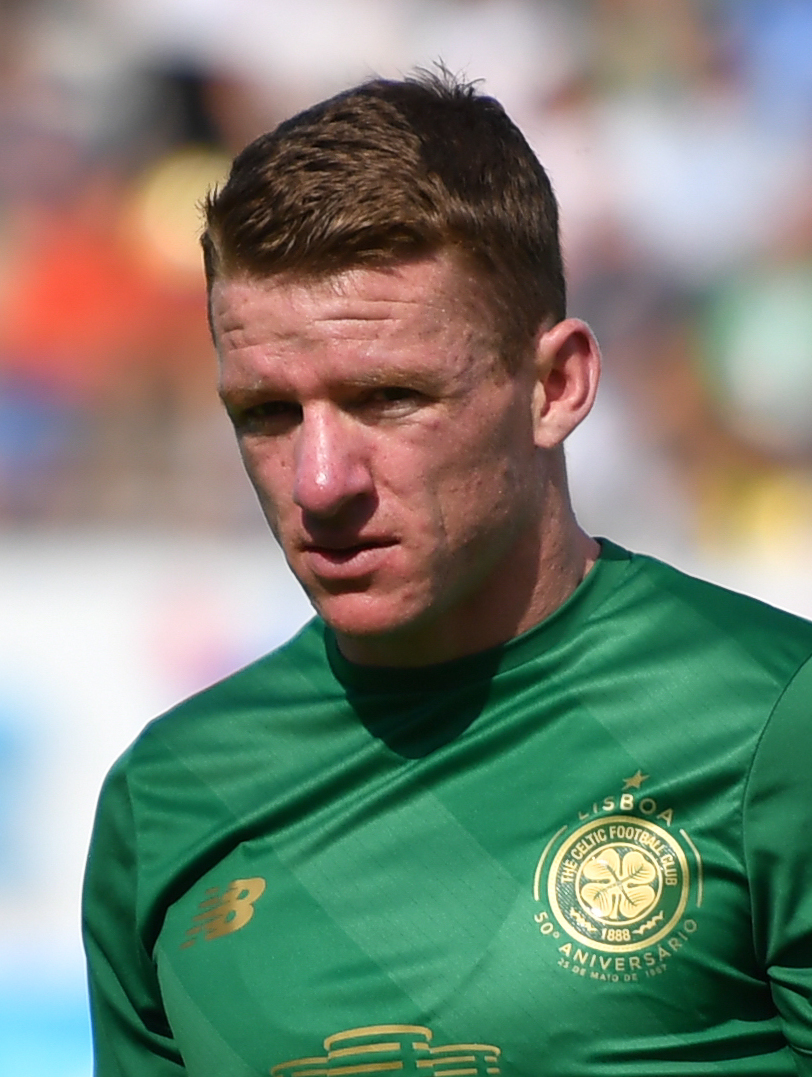
- Hayes playing for Celtic in 2017

Personal information
- Full name: Jonathan Hayes
- Date of birth: 9 July 1987 (age 39)
- Place of birth: Dublin, Ireland
- Height: 1.70 m (5 ft 7 in)
- Position: Winger

Youth career
- 2003–2004: Reading

Senior career*
Years	Team	Apps	(Gls)
2004–2007	Reading	0	(0)
2006	→ Forest Green Rovers (loan)	5	(1)
2007	→ Milton Keynes Dons (loan)	13	(0)
2007–2009	Leicester City	7	(0)
2008	→ Northampton Town (loan)	11	(0)
2008–2009	→ Cheltenham Town (loan)	9	(0)
2009–2012	Inverness Caledonian Thistle	99	(25)
2012–2017	Aberdeen	206	(30)
2017–2020	Celtic	67	(2)
2020–2024	Aberdeen	135	(8)
Total		552	(66)

International career
2006–2007	Republic of Ireland U21	4	(1)
2016–2017	Republic of Ireland	4	(0)
- * Club domestic league appearances and goals

Jonathan Hayes (born 9 July 1987) is an Irish retired professional footballer. He is a coach for Celtic B.

He began his career in England with Reading, but did not break through to their first team, serving two loan spells prior to being released. Picked up by Leicester City, his opportunities were also limited and again he went out on loan twice. He joined Inverness Caledonian Thistle in Scotland in 2009, becoming an important member of the team, a status he also enjoyed after moving on to Aberdeen three years later. In 2017 he signed for Celtic, the reigning Scottish champions, helping them to defend their title and win the following two as a squad member, sometimes playing at left back; he left in 2020 and returned to Aberdeen in June 2020.

== Club career ==
=== Early career ===
Hayes was born in Dublin, County Dublin. He started his career at Reading, but with first team opportunities limited, he joined Forest Green Rovers on loan in February 2006, scoring on his debut in the FA Trophy against Dorchester Town. He spent a month on loan at Chesterfield in October 2006 without making an appearance, and in January 2007, was loaned to MK Dons until the end of the 2006–07 season.

=== Leicester City ===
On 6 June 2007, Hayes was released by Reading at the end of his contract. He joined Leicester City on a three-year deal on 4 July 2007, and made his league debut against Blackpool on 11 August.

On 20 July 2009, Hayes was released from his Leicester contract by mutual consent.

=== Northampton Town (loan) ===
On 7 January 2008, Hayes joined Northampton Town on loan until the end of the season. On 13 October, Hayes joined Cheltenham Town on a trial period, with a view to a loan move, a move which was confirmed on 20 October 2008.

=== Inverness Caledonian Thistle ===
On 22 July 2009, Hayes joined Scottish First Division side Inverness Caledonian Thistle after a successful trial period. Inverness were promoted to the Scottish Premier League at the end of the 2009–10 season. Hayes was part of the team that guided Inverness to the Challenge Cup final against Dundee. Hayes was involved in setting up both goals for Adam Rooney and Nauris Bulvitis, however, the Highlanders lost out 3–2 to Dundee at McDiarmid Park in Perth

Hayes was linked with a move away from Inverness after impressing in his debut season with the club, as his contract was expiring. However, he went on to sign a new two-year deal. On 11 September 2010, he scored the opening goal in an SPL match against Rangers with a stunning long-range strike.

Hayes left Inverness after the 2011–12 season. He rejected their offer of a new one-year contract.

=== Aberdeen ===
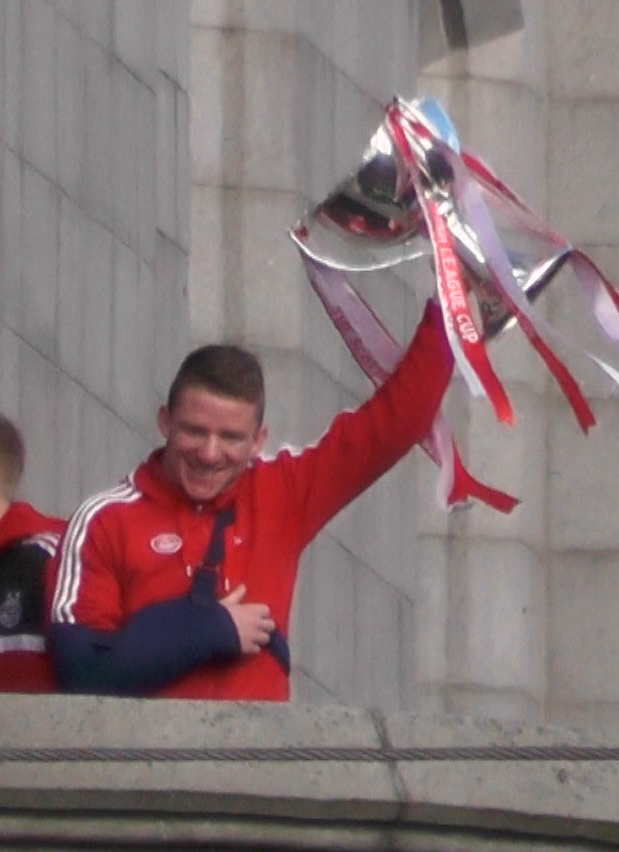
Hayes after winning the Scottish League Cup with Aberdeen in 2014

Aberdeen claimed a deal had been struck with Hayes on 30 May 2012. Almost a month later, Hayes finally put pen to paper, signing a two-year contract with the Dons. Hayes went on to make his competitive debut for Aberdeen, in an opening day 1–0 defeat away to SPL champions Celtic. The following weekend, Hayes made his home debut against newly promoted side Ross County in a game which finished 0–0. He scored his first goal in Aberdeen colours in a testimonial for Neil Simpson against Manchester United. The midfielder showed good perseverance, pinching the ball off of Paul Scholes in the penalty box, before beating David de Gea with a composed finish.

Hayes scored his first competitive goal for the Dons' in a 2–1 victory away to St Johnstone. He pounced on a mistake by goalkeeper Alan Mannus and defender Frazer Wright, leaving Hayes with the easy task of firing into the empty net, before celebrating in front of the travelling Aberdeen support. On 15 September, he provided an assist for Cammy Smith to equalise against his old club, Inverness, in the dying minutes. The game finished 1–1.

On 3 August 2013, Hayes opened the scoring in the first match of the new season against Kilmarnock. This goal gave Hayes the honour of scoring the first ever goal in the new Scottish Premiership. Hayes agreed a contract extension in November 2013 that would keep him at Aberdeen until the summer of 2016.

In a 4–0 win over St Johnstone in the League Cup semi-final at Tynecastle, Hayes scored twice to help send the Dons into their first major cup final for 14 years. A poor goal kick by Steve Banks allowed Adam Rooney to square the ball across the six-yard box for Hayes to knock into the net. Clever footwork by the winger late in the second half led to a fine finish just inside the 18-yard box to wrap up the match and send Aberdeen through to the final. Celtic goalkeeper Fraser Forster's run of clean sheets (13 games) was finally ended on 1,256 minutes on 25 February 2014 when Hayes beat him from 30 yards to open the scoring in a 2–1 win for The Dons. The goal was later voted as the SPFL Goal of the Season. On 16 March 2014, Hayes started for Aberdeen in the League Cup final but early on he suffered a shoulder injury and had to be replaced by Cammy Smith.

In the opening match of the 2014–15 season he scored Aberdeen's fourth goal in a 5–0 victory against FK Daugava Riga in the Europa League first qualifying round first leg.

On 29 December 2014, it was announced that Hayes had signed a contract extension, keeping him at Aberdeen until summer 2018.

In February 2016, Hayes had 18 stitches in his arm after being bitten by a dog.

=== Celtic ===
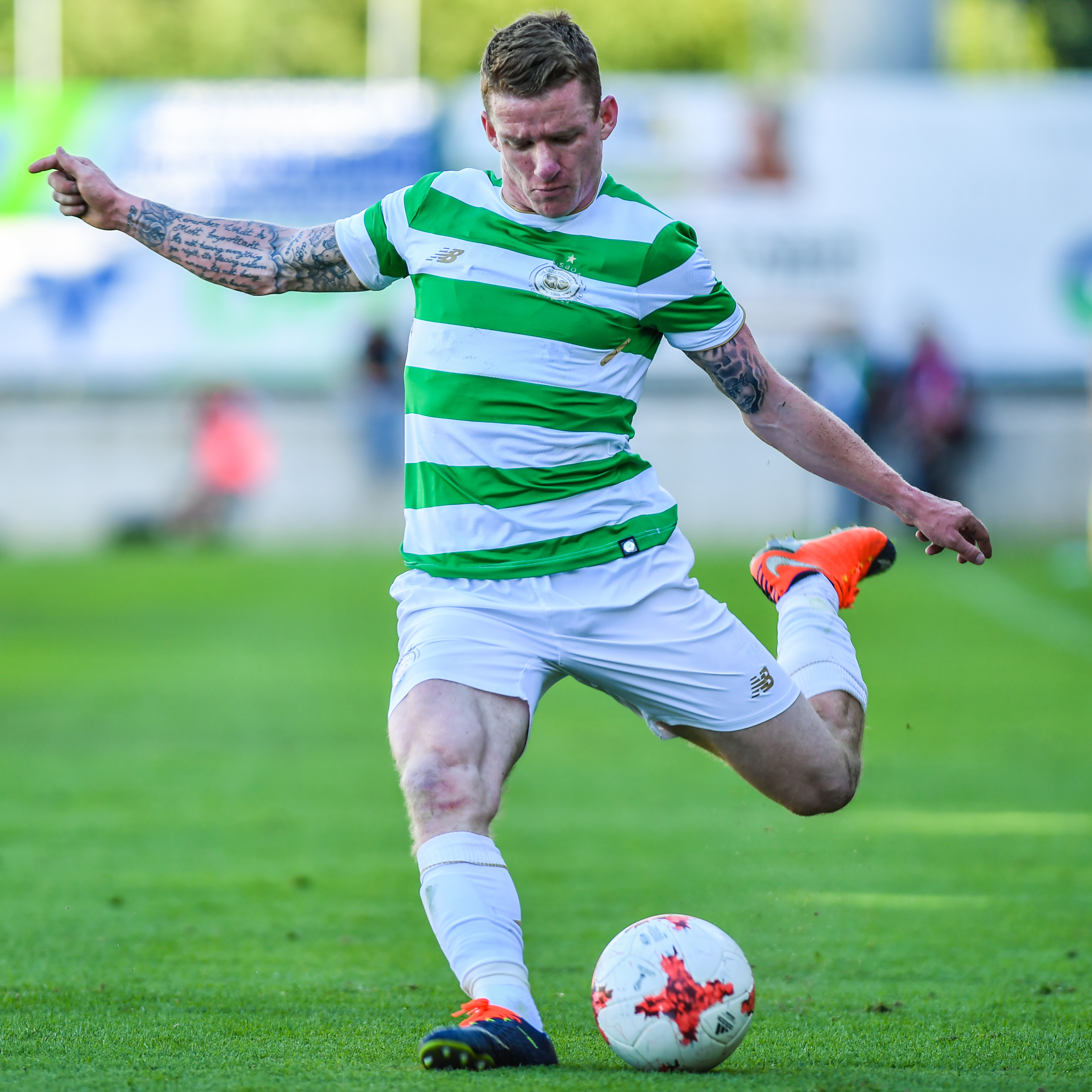
Hayes playing for Celtic in 2017

On 17 June 2017, Hayes signed a three-year deal with Scottish Premiership champions Celtic, for a fee in the region of £1 million. On 23 December 2017, Hayes scored his first competitive goal for Celtic against his former club Aberdeen, scoring the second goal in a 3–0 win. He spent the second half of the season out injured after a tackle during a game against Dundee on Boxing Day, three days after his first goal of the season. He scored his second goal for the club in the 2–0 win over Rangers at Ibrox on 1 September 2019. He was released by the club in May 2020.

=== Return to Aberdeen ===
Hayes rejoined Aberdeen on a free transfer from Celtic, his contract having expired, on 23 June 2020, after three years away from the club. He signed a two-year deal.

In August 2020 he was one of eight Aberdeen players who received a suspended three-match ban from the Scottish Football Association after they breached coronavirus-related restrictions by visiting a bar earlier in the month.

Hayes left Aberdeen at the end of the 2023–24 season, upon the expiration of his contract and his decision to turn down an offer for a coaching role within the club's youth academy. On 10 July, he took up a coaching role at Celtic. On 16 July, Hayes announced his retirement from professional football.

== International career ==
Hayes received his first senior call-up in March 2016.

== Career statistics ==
Appearances and goals by club, season and competition
Club	Season	League			National Cup		League Cup		Other		Total	
Club	Season	Division	Apps	Goals	Apps	Goals	Apps	Goals	Apps	Goals	Apps	Goals
Reading	2004–05	Championship	0	0	0	0	0	0	0	0	0	0
Reading	2005–06	Championship	0	0	0	0	0	0	0	0	0	0
Reading	2006–07	Premier League	0	0	0	0	0	0	0	0	0	0
Reading	Total		0	0	0	0	0	0	0	0	0	0
Forest Green (loan)	2005–06	Conference National	4	1	0	0	0	0	0	0	4	1
MK Dons (loan)	2006–07	League Two	11	0	0	0	0	0	2 (Note: Appearances in League Two play-offs)	0	13	0
Leicester City	2007–08	Championship	7	0	0	0	0	0	0	0	7	0
Leicester City	2008–09	League One	0	0	0	0	0	0	0	0	0	0
Leicester City	Total		7	0	0	0	0	0	0	0	7	0
Northampton Town (loan)	2007–08	League Two	11	0	0	0	0	0	0	0	11	0
Cheltenham Town (loan)	2008–09	League One	6	0	3	0	0	0	0	0	9	0
Inverness Caledonian Thistle	2009–10	Scottish First Division	35	10	2	0	2	0	4 (Note: Appearances in Scottish Challenge Cup)	0	43	10
Inverness Caledonian Thistle	2010–11	Scottish Premier League	24	6	1	0	2	0	0	0	27	6
Inverness Caledonian Thistle	2011–12	Scottish Premier League	26	7	3	2	1	0	0	0	30	9
Inverness Caledonian Thistle	Total		85	23	6	2	5	0	4	0	100	25
Aberdeen	2012–13	Scottish Premier League	35	4	3	0	3	0	0	0	41	4
Aberdeen	2013–14	Scottish Premiership	31	2	2	0	5	3	0	0	38	5
Aberdeen	2014–15	Scottish Premiership	32	3	1	0	3	0	6 (Note: Appearances in Europa League)	1	42	4
Aberdeen	2015–16	Scottish Premiership	35	5	1	0	0	0	6	1	42	6
Aberdeen	2016–17	Scottish Premiership	32	9	5	1	2	0	5	1	44	11
Aberdeen	Total		165	23	12	0	13	3	17	3	207	29
Celtic	2017–18	Scottish Premiership	15	1	0	0	1	0	4 (Note: Appearances in Champions League)	0	20	1
Celtic	2018–19	Scottish Premiership	16	0	3	0	0	0	2	0	21	0
Celtic	2019–20	Scottish Premiership	14	1	2	0	4	0	6 (Note: One appearance in Champions League, five appearances in Europa League)	0	26	1
Celtic	Total		45	2	5	0	5	0	12	0	67	2
Aberdeen	2020–21	Scottish Premiership	34	2	3	0	1	0	3	1	41	3
Aberdeen	2021–22	Scottish Premiership	35	2	2	0	1	0	6 (Note: Appearances in Europa Conference League)	0	44	2
Aberdeen	2022–23	Scottish Premiership	30	1	1	0	6	1	0	0	37	2
Aberdeen	2023–24	Scottish Premiership	14	1	0	0	2	0	7	0	23	1
Aberdeen	Total		113	6	6	0	10	1	16	1	145	8
Career total			447	55	32	3	33	4	51	4	563	66

== Honours ==
Inverness Caledonian Thistle

- Scottish First Division: 2009–10

Aberdeen

- Scottish League Cup: 2013–14

Celtic

- Scottish Premiership: 2017–18, 2018–19, 2019–20
- Scottish League Cup: 2018–19, 2019–20
- Scottish Cup: 2018–19, 2019–20

Individual

- SFL Player of the Month: November 2009, April 2010
- SPFA Goal of the Season: 2013–14
- SPFA Premiership Team of the Year: 2015–16, 2016–17
- Most assists in the Scottish Premiership: 2016–17
- Aberdeen FC Player of the Year: 2015–16
- Aberdeen FC Players' Player of the Year: 2015–16
- Aberdeen FC Goal of the Season: 2015–16
- Evening Express Player of the Year: 2014–15
