= Matty Kennedy =

Northern Irish professional footballer (born 1994)

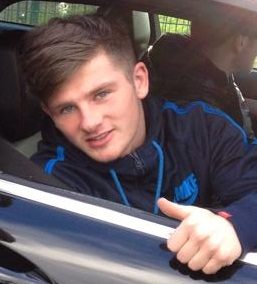
- Kennedy in December 2013 at Everton's training ground.

Personal information
- Full name: Matthew Kennedy
- Date of birth: 1 November 1994 (age 32)
- Place of birth: Belfast, Northern Ireland
- Height: 1.75 m (5 ft 9 in)
- Position: Winger

Team information
- Current team: Kilmarnock
- Number: 10

Youth career
- 2009–2011: Kilmarnock

Senior career*
Years	Team	Apps	(Gls)
2011–2012	Kilmarnock	14	(0)
2012–2015	Everton	0	(0)
2014	→ Tranmere Rovers (loan)	8	(0)
2014	→ Milton Keynes Dons (loan)	7	(1)
2014–2015	→ Hibernian (loan)	13	(0)
2015–2018	Cardiff City	18	(0)
2016	→ Port Vale (loan)	12	(0)
2017	→ Plymouth Argyle (loan)	17	(5)
2017–2018	→ Portsmouth (loan)	29	(3)
2018–2020	St Johnstone	54	(9)
2020–2023	Aberdeen	68	(3)
2023–	Kilmarnock	54	(7)

International career^{‡}
2009	Scotland U15	1	(0)
2009–2010	Scotland U16	6	(3)
2010–2012	Scotland U17	15	(5)
2012	Scotland U18	2	(0)
2012	Scotland U19	10	(1)
2012	Scotland U21	1	(0)
2020–	Northern Ireland	5	(0)
- * Club domestic league appearances and goals as of 12 May 2025 (UTC) ‡ National team caps and goals as of 08:05, 20 June 2024 (UTC)

Matthew Kennedy (born 1 November 1994) is a professional footballer who plays as a winger for Scottish Premiership club Kilmarnock. Having represented Scotland at the youth international level, he has represented Northern Ireland at the senior international level.

Kennedy began his career at Kilmarnock and represented Scotland at all youth international levels. He was sold to Everton in August 2012. He was loaned out to Tranmere Rovers, Milton Keynes Dons, and Hibernian, before being sold to Cardiff City in February 2015. Initially a first-team regular at Cardiff, he was dropped in the 2015–16 season and joined Port Vale on loan in January 2016, and then Plymouth Argyle on loan in January 2017; he helped Plymouth to achieve promotion out of EFL League Two at the end of the season. He joined Portsmouth on loan for the 2017–18 season.

Kennedy returned to Scottish football in July 2018, signing with St Johnstone. He moved to Aberdeen in January 2020, where he would remain for two and a half seasons before rejoining Kilmarnock in June 2023.

== Career ==
=== Kilmarnock ===
Born in Belfast, Kennedy had the opportunity to join the youth academies of Celtic and Rangers, but chose to join Kilmarnock as the club were closer to his home in South Ayrshire. He felt Kilmarnock played a style of football that suited him. On 19 November 2011, aged 17, Kennedy made his first-team debut as a substitute in a 1–1 draw with Hibernian at Easter Road. He started his first game for "Killie" in a 2–1 win over St Mirren at Rugby Park on 2 January 2012. He ended the 2011–12 campaign with 11 Scottish Premier League appearances. He played three games at the start of the 2012–13 season before leaving the club; manager Kenny Shiels expressed his concern that Kennedy had left Kilmarnock too soon and he had missed out on seeing Kennedy's "proper development" at the club.

=== Everton ===
On 31 August 2012, the final day of the summer transfer window, Kennedy signed for English Premier League side Everton for a "nominal fee". The fee was later revealed to be £225,000. In a later interview he stated that "I've got nothing but praise for their academy. I don't think you could have a better youth set up. My coaches were David Unsworth, Alan Stubbs and David Weir."

On 9 January 2014, Kennedy signed on loan for League One side Tranmere Rovers. Manager Ronnie Moore extended the loan spell for a further month after being impressed by his first six appearances at Prenton Park. On 26 March 2014, Kennedy joined Milton Keynes Dons, also of League One, on a youth loan until the end of the 2013–14 season. Manager Karl Robinson stated that Kennedy would bring "pace, trickery and excitement" to Stadium mk. He scored his first goal in the English Football League for the "Dons" in a 2–2 draw at Rotherham United on 26 April.

On 8 August 2014, Kennedy joined Scottish Championship side Hibernian on a six-month loan deal after being signed by his former Everton under-21 manager Alan Stubbs. He initially found himself on the bench at Easter Road. However, Stubbs was keen to extend the loan deal until the end of the 2014–15 season. On 29 October, he scored his second senior goal to help secure a 3–3 draw with Dundee United in the Scottish League Cup quarter-finals, however, he missed his penalty in the resulting shoot-out. He said that he was "devastated" by his miss, which eliminated "Hibs" from the competition. He returned to Goodison Park on 5 January.

=== Cardiff City ===
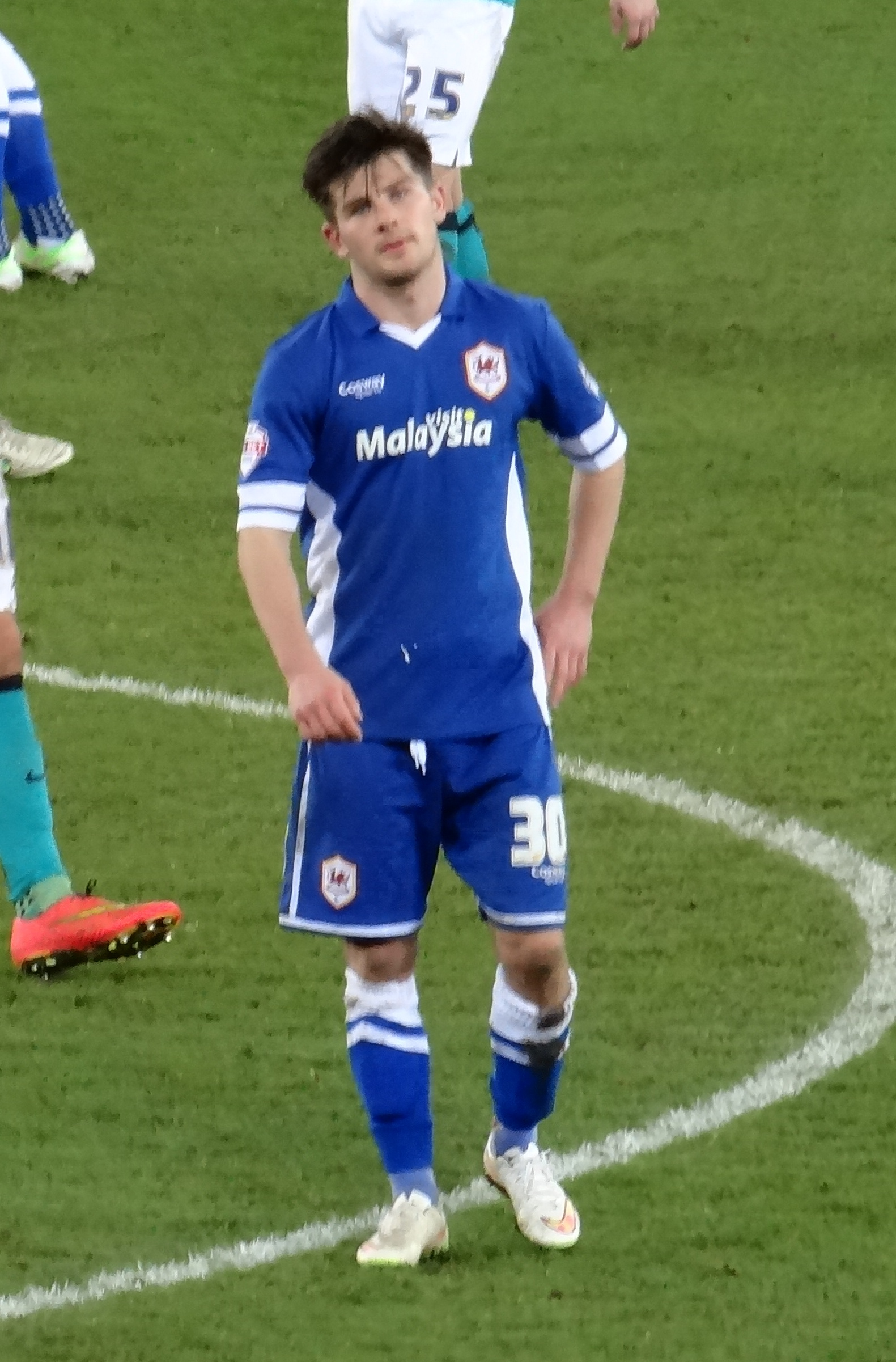
Kennedy playing for Cardiff City in 2015.

On 2 February 2015, Kennedy signed for Championship side Cardiff City on a three-and-a-half-year contract for an undisclosed fee. He made his full debut for the "Bluebirds" 15 days later in a 1–1 draw with Blackburn Rovers at Cardiff City Stadium, playing the full 90 minutes and producing a man of the match performance. He settled in well at the club and was touted as one of manager Russell Slade's best signings for the club. He made a total of 14 league appearances in the second half of the 2014–15 season.

Kennedy was described as a "forgotten man" after playing just one league game in the first half of the 2015–16 season. On 25 January 2016, he joined League One side Port Vale on a one-month loan. He said that he was attracted to the "Valiants" by manager Rob Page, who Cardiff coaches told him was the best man to bring out his best qualities. He began his time at Vale Park in good form and was hopeful of extending his stay further than the initial month. After late negotiations, Cardiff agreed to extend the loan until 26 April. However, he returned to Cardiff on 7 April after being demoted from the first XI to a place on the bench. Page said that "to go from under-21s football to playing week-in, week-out, two games a week at League One level caught up with him".

On 31 January 2017, he joined EFL League Two club Plymouth Argyle on loan until the end of the 2016–17 season. Cardiff manager Neil Warnock predicted that Kennedy would "set the league alight" for the "Pilgrims", and his words were vindicated early on as Kennedy picked up two-man of the match awards as he scored in three consecutive games – including an "outstanding" goal in a victory over West Country derby rivals Exeter City at Home Park. He went on to be nominated for the EFL League Two Player of the Month award for February. He scored five goals in 17 games to help Argyle to win promotion as runners-up of League Two.

On 31 August 2017, Kennedy joined Cardiff teammate Stuart O'Keefe on loan at League One side Portsmouth for the 2017–18 season. He had impressed "Pompey" manager Kenny Jackett playing against the club in the EFL Cup earlier in the month. He scored his first goal for the club in a 3–1 defeat at Northampton Town on 12 September. After a good start to his time at Fratton Park he suffered a dip in form. He became a bit-part player, which assistant manager Joe Gallen blamed on Kennedy over-thinking his play. At the end of the 2017–18 season, Cardiff released Kennedy upon the expiration of his contract on 30 June.

=== St Johnstone ===
On 21 July 2018, Kennedy signed a two-year deal with Scottish Premiership club St Johnstone. Manager Tommy Wright said that it was a "real coup for us" to sign the winger. On 3 April 2019, he scored in a 2–0 win over Tayside derby rivals Dundee at McDiarmid Park. He ended the 2018–19 season with seven goals in 41 appearances as the "Saints" posted a seventh-place finish.

=== Aberdeen ===
Kennedy signed a pre-contract agreement with Aberdeen on 15 January 2020. Nine days later he joined Aberdeen on a three-and-a-half-year deal. The "Dons" were reported to have paid a transfer fee of £75,000 plus add-ons. Manager Derek McInnes had been reported to have been tracking Kennedy for the previous nine years. By the time the 2019–20 season was halted due to the COVID-19 pandemic in Scotland, Kennedy had six goals (all for St Johnstone) and eight assists and said he was starting to show his best form.

In August 2020, he was one of eight Aberdeen players who received a suspended three-match ban from the Scottish Football Association (SFA) after they breached coronavirus-related restrictions by visiting a bar earlier in the month. He made a total of 35 appearances throughout the 2020–21 season, helping Aberdeen to post a fourth-place finish in the league. He scored just one goal, a consolation in a 2–1 defeat to Rangers at Pittodrie.

In August 2021, he was linked with a loan move to St Mirren – manager Jim Goodwin was reported to be a keen admirer of his – after falling out of favour under new manager Stephen Glass. A spinal problem (diagnosed as stress fractures) caused him to miss the first half of the 2021–22 season. He made his first appearance at the end of January 2022. He made a further eight appearances before the season's end, though Goodwin – now manager of Aberdeen – did not want to rush him back too soon.

He cited a hope to have a "fresh start" in summer 2022, and Goodwin stated that he could be a "big player" for the club. In January 2023, Kennedy said he had "a bit of unfinished business" with the club and aimed to earn a new contract. The following month he backed interim manager Barry Robson to be given the job permanently. Despite this, he barely featured under Robson in the second half of the 2022–23 campaign.

=== Return to Kilmarnock ===
On 21 June 2023, Kennedy agreed a three-year contract with former club Kilmarnock. On 10 December, he scored a late winner to inflict a first league defeat of the 2023–24 season on Celtic. Speaking in February, manager Derek McInnes commented that "his performances have been really good of late". His absence due to injury was cited by pundit Billy Dodds as the major factor in the club's quarter-final exit from the Scottish Cup. He enjoyed an excellent start to the 2024–25 campaign. He said there was "nothing fancy" behind his good form aside from relaxing in his downtime away from football. However, he suffered a lengthy injury lay-off due to a back problem that left him sidelined for over three months.

He missed the start of the 2025–26 season after undergoing surgery to fix his hip injury issue. Manager Stuart Kettlewell confirmed that Kennedy would be in recovery for an "extended period". He did not feature at all in the campaign.

== International career ==
=== Scotland youth ===
Kennedy has represented Scotland at under-15, under-16, under-17 and under-19 level. He was selected by under-21 interim coach Ricky Sbragia to play Portugal under-21 at Estádio do Bonfim, Setúbal on 14 November 2012; he came on for Callum Paterson 66 minutes into a 3–2 defeat, in what was his only under-21 cap.

=== Northern Ireland ===
In September 2019, it was reported that Kennedy was due to switch his international allegiance to the country of his birth, Northern Ireland. He was pictured training with the senior Northern Ireland squad ahead of a friendly with Luxembourg. He was called up to the Northern Ireland senior squad on 3 October. He made his debut for Northern Ireland on 18 November 2020, in a 1–1 draw with Romania in the UEFA Nations League. He was recalled to the squad in March 2022 and again twelve months later.

== Style of play ==
Able to play on either wing, Kennedy was described by Tranmere Rovers manager Ronnie Moore as "quick, [he] likes to take on defenders and [is someone] will create chances for his team-mates".

== Career statistics ==
=== Club statistics ===
As of match played 12 April 2025

Appearances and goals by club, season and competition
Club	Season	League			National cup (Note: Includes Scottish Cup, FA Cup)		League cup (Note: Includes Scottish League Cup, Football League Cup)		Other		Total	
Club	Season	Division	Apps	Goals	Apps	Goals	Apps	Goals	Apps	Goals	Apps	Goals
Kilmarnock	2011–12	Scottish Premier League	11	0	0	0	0	0	—		11	0
Kilmarnock	2012–13	Scottish Premier League	3	0	0	0	0	0	—		3	0
Kilmarnock	Total		14	0	0	0	0	0	0	0	14	0
Everton	2012–13	Premier League	0	0	0	0	—		—		0	0
Everton	2013–14	Premier League	0	0	0	0	0	0	—		0	0
Everton	2014–15	Premier League	0	0	0	0	0	0	0	0	0	0
Everton	Total		0	0	0	0	0	0	0	0	0	0
Tranmere Rovers (loan)	2013–14	League One	8	0	—		—		—		8	0
Milton Keynes Dons (loan)	2013–14	League One	7	1	—		—		—		7	1
Hibernian (loan)	2014–15	Scottish Championship	13	0	1	0	2	1	0	0	16	1
Cardiff City	2014–15	Championship	14	0	0	0	0	0	0	0	14	0
Cardiff City	2015–16	Championship	1	0	1	0	0	0	0	0	2	0
Cardiff City	2016–17	Championship	2	0	0	0	1	0	0	0	3	0
Cardiff City	2017–18	Championship	1	0	0	0	2	0	0	0	3	0
Cardiff City	Total		18	0	1	0	3	0	0	0	22	0
Port Vale (loan)	2015–16	League One	12	0	—		—		—		12	0
Plymouth Argyle (loan)	2016–17	League Two	17	5	—		—		—		17	5
Portsmouth (loan)	2017–18	League One	29	3	1	0	—		3 (Note: Appearance(s) in the EFL Trophy.)	0	33	3
St Johnstone	2018–19	Scottish Premiership	36	6	2	0	3	1	—		41	7
St Johnstone	2019–20	Scottish Premiership	18	3	0	0	3	2	—		21	5
St Johnstone	Total		54	9	2	0	6	3	0	0	62	12
Aberdeen	2019–20	Scottish Premiership	8	0	4	1	—		—		12	1
Aberdeen	2020–21	Scottish Premiership	31	1	2	0	1	0	1 (Note: Appearances in the UEFA Europa League)	0	35	1
Aberdeen	2021–22	Scottish Premiership	8	0	1	0	0	0	0	0	9	0
Aberdeen	2022–23	Scottish Premiership	21	2	1	0	7	2	—		29	4
Aberdeen	Total		68	3	8	1	8	2	1	0	85	6
Kilmarnock	2023–24	Scottish Premiership	35	3	2	0	6	0	—		43	3
Kilmarnock	2024–25	Scottish Premiership	19	4	0	0	1	0	6 (Note: 2 appearances in the UEFA Europa League and 4 appearances in the UEFA Conference League)	0	26	4
Kilmarnock	2025–26	Scottish Premiership	0	0	0	0	0	0	—		0	0
Kilmarnock	2026–27	Scottish Premiership	0	0	0	0	0	0	—		0	0
Kilmarnock	Total		54	7	2	0	7	0	6	0	69	7
Career total			294	28	15	1	26	6	10	0	345	35

=== International statistics ===
As of match played 10 September 2023

Appearances and goals by national team and year
National team	Year	Apps	Goals
Northern Ireland	2020	1	0
Northern Ireland	2021	2	0
Northern Ireland	2023	2	0
Total		5	0

== Honours ==
Plymouth Argyle

- EFL League Two second-place promotion: 2016–17
