= Vicente Besuijen =

Dutch footballer (born 2001)

Personal information
- Full name: Vicente Andrés Felipe Federico Besuijen
- Date of birth: 10 April 2001 (age 25)
- Place of birth: Bogotá, Colombia
- Height: 1.69 m (5 ft 7 in)
- Positions: Forward; right winger

Youth career
- VV Aalsmeer
- RKSV Pancratius
- 2010–2012: Ajax
- 2012–2017: Volendam
- 2017–2020: Roma

Senior career*
Years	Team	Apps	(Gls)
2020–2022	ADO Den Haag	52	(7)
2022–2026	Aberdeen	45	(7)
2023	→ Excelsior Rotterdam (loan)	2	(0)
2024	→ Emmen (loan)	15	(5)
2025	→ HJK (loan)	12	(1)
2026	→ Emmen (loan)	16	(0)
2026-	FC Eindhoven	4	(1)

International career
2016	Netherlands U15	1	(1)
2017	Netherlands U16	1	(0)
2018–2019	Netherlands U18	6	(0)
2019–2020	Netherlands U19	5	(0)
- * Club domestic league appearances and goals as of 28 April 2026

Vicente Besuijen (Dutch pronunciation: [vəˈsɛntə bəˈsœyə(n)]; born 10 April 2001) is a professional football player who plays as a forward or right winger. Born in Colombia, he represented the Netherlands at youth level.

== Club career ==
Besuijen played in the youth academies of Ajax, Volendam and Roma. He started his senior career in 2020 with ADO Den Haag in Eredivisie, making 30 appearances and scoring one goal.

On 24 January 2022, Besuijen joined Scottish Premiership side Aberdeen on a four-and-a-half-year contract from Eerste Divisie side ADO Den Haag.

On 31 January 2023, Besuijen joined Eredivisie club Excelsior Rotterdam on loan until the end of the season with an option to buy. The option was not taken up and he returned to Aberdeen for pre-season training to fight for his chance with new manager Barry Robson.

On 25 January 2024, Besuijen moved on a new loan to Emmen. Besuijen returned to Aberdeen, having helped Emmen reach the latter stages of the playoffs, scoring 7 goals in 8 games and assisting 1. He missed most of the 2024–25 season due to injury.

On 23 July 2025, he was loaned out to Veikkausliiga club HJK Helsinki with an option to buy.

On 15 January 2026, Besuijen returned to Emmen on loan.

== Personal life ==
Besuijen was born in Colombia, but was adopted by his Dutch parents when he was three months old. He grew up in Amstelveen.

== Career statistics ==
As of 23 July 2025

Appearances and goals by club, season and competition
Club	Season	League			National cup (Note: Includes KNVB Cup and Scottish Cup)		League cup (Note: Includes Scottish League Cup)		Europe		Other		Total	
Club	Season	Division	Apps	Goals	Apps	Goals	Apps	Goals	Apps	Goals	Apps	Goals	Apps	Goals
ADO Den Haag	2020–21	Eredivisie	30	1	1	0	0	0	–		–		31	1
ADO Den Haag	2021–22	Eerste Divisie	22	6	3	0	0	0	–		–		25	6
ADO Den Haag	Total		52	7	4	0	0	0	0	0	0	0	56	7
Aberdeen	2021–22	Scottish Premiership	16	2	1	0	0	0	–		0	0	17	2
Aberdeen	2022–23	Scottish Premiership	18	3	1	0	6	4	–		0	0	25	7
Aberdeen	2023–24	Scottish Premiership	0	0	0	0	0	0	0	0	0	0	0	0
Aberdeen	2024–25	Scottish Premiership	11	2	0	0	4	0	–		0	0	15	2
Aberdeen	Total		45	7	2	0	10	4	0	0	0	0	57	11
Excelsior Rotterdam (loan)	2022–23	Eredivisie	2	0	0	0	0	0	–		–		2	0
Emmen (loan)	2023–24	Eerste Divisie	15	5	0	0	0	0	–		4	3	19	8
HJK (loan)	2025	Veikkausliiga	0	0	0	0	0	0	0	0	–		0	0
Career total			116	21	6	0	10	4	0	0	4	3	136	28

== Honours ==
HJK

- Finnish Cup: 2025
