= Dave Cormack =

Scottish entrepreneur

- Occupation: Business executive
- Title: Chairman of the Aberdeen Football Club

Dave Cormack is a US-based Scottish entrepreneur and the Chairman of the Aberdeen Football Club. He is the founder of several software companies, including Soft Systems, MiracleWorkers.com, and Brightree. He is now Chairman of Curve Dental Software, after investing alongside Battery Ventures, with whom he is also a Limited Partner.

== Business career ==
Cormack founded Soft Systems, a London-based vendor of business intelligence tools, and sold the company in 1995 to Atlanta-based IQ Software. He then founded the healthcare recruiting website MiracleWorkers.com, which he sold to CareerBuilder.com in 2000. Cormack then founded Brightree in 2005, a business management and clinical software company. Cormack served as the president and CEO of Brightree, before selling the company to ResMed for $800 million USD in 2016. Cormack was awarded an Honorary Doctorate in Business (DBA) by Robert Gordon University in July 2024.

== Aberdeen Football Club ==
Between 2000 and 2001, Cormack was the CEO of the Aberdeen Football Club. In June 2017, Cormack returned to the club as an investor and member of the board. Cormack was eventually elevated to the position of Vice-Chairman of the club, after which the team’s new training facility was named after him. In November 2019 Cormack became the Chairman of Aberdeen. With them winning their first trophy under his stewardship, the Scottish Cup, in 2025, their first Scottish Cup in 35 years.

== Board work ==
Cormack also served on the board of WebPT, and currently also serves as Chairman of Curve Dental Software, investing alongside Battery Ventures, with whom he is also a Limited Partner. He is also co-founder of the Cormack Family Charitable Foundation with his wife Fiona.
