= 2025–26 Aberdeen F.C. season =

Aberdeen
2025–26 season
- Chairman: Dave Cormack
- Manager: Jimmy Thelin (until 4 January); Peter Leven (interim); Stephen Robinson (from 12 March)
- Ground: Pittodrie Stadium; Aberdeen, Scotland (Capacity: 20,866)
- Scottish Premiership: Ninth place
- Scottish Cup: Quarter-finals
- Scottish League Cup: Quarter-finals
- Europa League: Play-off round
- Conference League: League phase
- Top goalscorer: League: Kevin Nisbet (9); All: Kevin Nisbet (11)
- Highest home attendance: 19,741 vs. Dundee United, Premiership, 27 December 2025
- Lowest home attendance: 9,525 vs. Raith Rovers, Scottish Cup, 18 January 2026
- Average home league attendance: 17,473
Home colours	Away colours	Third colours

The 2025–26 Aberdeen F.C. season was Aberdeen's 112th season in the top flight of Scottish football and the thirteenth in the Scottish Premiership. Aberdeen also competed in the League Cup and the Scottish Cup. They participated in qualifying for the UEFA Europa League having won the Scottish Cup. However, they competed in the Group phase of the Conference League and finished in 35th place and lost in the Scottish Cup to Dunfermline Athletic.

== Summary ==
=== May ===
On 15 May 2025, Australian winger Nicolas Milanovic signed for an undisclosed fee, reported to be the highest in Western Sydney Wanderers history. Topi Keskinen was named in the Finland U21 squad for the UEFA European U21 Championships. On 29 May, the club announced the departures of players Jack MacKenzie who joined Plymouth Argyle, Ross Doohan, Tom Ritchie, Jamie McGrath who signed a pre-contract with fellow Premiership side Hibernian, youth players Blair McKenzie, Evan Towler, Victor Enem and Fraser Mackie. All players on loan returned to their respective clubs. On 30 May, Australian goalkeeper Nick Suman signed on a free after being released by League One side Cove.

=== June ===
On 2 June, Timothy Akindileni left the club to join EFL Championship side Queens Park Rangers for an undisclosed fee. On 3 June, Dutch defender Mats Knoester signed a long-term contract lasting until 2029. On 6 June, Emmanuel Gyamfi signed for an undisclosed fee from German Bundesliga 2 side Schalke 04. On 8 June, Australian international striker Kusini Yengi joined on a free from English side Portsmouth. On 19 June, James McGarry left and signed a deal with Brisbane Roar to join their club on 1 July. Ipswich Town was confirmed as a pre-season friendly for the new campaign along with Cove Rangers and a match behind closed doors. The regular league fixtures were also announced.

=== July ===
Pre-season started with a win at Cove Rangers, followed by a loss at Fulham's training ground and then at Pittodrie against Ipswich Town. Nineteen year old Icelandic midfielder Kjartan Már Kjartansson joined for an undisclosed fee while James McGarry and Richard Jensen left the club. The Dons signed a new Co-operation loan deal as part of the SPFL agreement with Kelty Hearts and Elgin City. Alfie Stewart re-joined Inverness and Vinnie Besuijen went also on a half-season loan to HJK. Adil Aouchiche joined on loan from Sunderland and Alfie Dorrington re-signed on loan from Tottenham Hotspur. On 31 July, Cammy Wilson left the club to sign for Derby County for an undisclosed fee.

=== August ===
Striker Pape Habib Guèye was sold to Kasımpaşa for a reported £850,000. Alfie Bavidge re-joined Inverness on a season long loan. They lost the season opener to Hearts on a Monday night live on television. This was followed up with another loss at home to Celtic. However they bounced back with a comfortable win at Morton in the League Cup. Slobodan Rubežić was sold and the club signed Kenan Bilalović from Värnamo and Marko Lazetić from AC Milan both for fees. The Dons came from two goals down to draw their first leg play-off match against FCSB. On 22 August, Ellis Clark left the club to sign for Burnley for an undisclosed fee. FCSB won the play-off with Aberdeen finishing the match with ten players and dropping to the Conference League Group Stage. Young left-back Mitchell Frame signed from Celtic for £250,000. A loss in the League at home to Falkirk, again ending a match with ten players resulted in the club being bottom having lost all three matches without scoring.

=== September ===
On Deadline Day, Kevin Nisbet re-joined the club on a permanent basis from Millwall for £300,000. Swedish International Jesper Karlsson joined on loan from Bologna. Shayden Morris left for Luton Town for an undisclosed fee. Stuart Armstrong signed a two year deal on a free. Aston Villa signed Fletcher Boyd for an undisclosed fee believed to be close a to a million pounds and joined up with their Academy. Ester Sokler left on a season loan deal to Serbian club Radnički Kragujevac. Dimitar Mitov, Topi Keskinen, Nicolas Milanovic and Kjartan Már Kjartansson along with youngsters Cooper Masson and Rodrigo Vitols were called up for the September Internationals. The club went on a score-less run in September and were knocked out of the League Cup by Motherwell.

=== October ===
After losing their first match in the Conference League to Shakhtar Donetsh, the Dons finally hit the ground running in the League with a comprehensive home victory against Dundee. This was followed up with a 96th minute winner by Marko Lazetić at St Mirren. They then suffered a humbling defeat by six in Athens, their worst ever European defeat. This compounded with a home defeat to Hibernian but ended the month with victory at Kilmarnock with Stuart Armstrong scoring his first for the club.

=== November ===
The Dons went the month unbeaten across the League and Conference League starting with a gritty goalless draw in Larnaca with the Dons finally holding their own with a disciplined defensive display. A home victory in the League against leaders Hearts as suffered their first league defeat of the season, Topi Keskinen's goal giving Aberdeen what seemed a surprising but excellent victory. However, a disappointing draw against Armenian minnows Noah meant the Dons faced an uphill task to qualify for the knock out stages of Europe. Despite being disjointed, they got a narrow victory at Livingston.

=== December ===
Aberdeen were knocked out of the Conference League after a home loss to top of the table Strasbourg. This was compounded with a heavy defeat in Prague, leaving the Dons finishing 35th out of the 36 clubs. A last minute equalizer seen them slip up at home to St Mirren but a dominant display with Adil Aouchiche scoring a double seen them past Dundee. A superb second-half fightback earned Aberdeen the three points at home to Kilmarnock but losses followed at Celtic and Hibernian with also an enthralling draw against Dundee United.

=== January ===
Manager Jimmy Thelin lost his job along with Assistant manager Christer Persson after a loss at Falkirk and winless run. First-team coach Peter Leven took charge on an interim basis for the club for the third time in his coaching career. He was assisted by Craig Hinchliffe and new sporting director Lutz Pfannenstiel who was appointed in October. However in their first match in charge, the Dons went down to Rangers as familiar issues plagued Aberdeen. Alfie Dorrington's loan was cut short before the match and he returned to his parent club. Unfortunately another loss followed at home to them. Ester Sokler was sold to his loan club for an undisclosed fee and Lyall Cameron joined on loan from The Rangers. Toyosi Olusanya signed on a loan deal from Houston Dynamo, Ex Bayern Munchen defender Liam Morrison joined on loan from QPR and former Norwegian International goalkeeper Per Kristian Bråtveit joined as a free agent as back-up Nick Suman suffered an ankle injury. Aberdeen battered basement dwellers Livingston to end their run of six Scottish Premiership games without a win in a topsy-turvy game at Pittodrie that ended with both sides down to 10 men and an unbelievable 6–2 victory. Nigerian midfielder Afeez Aremu joined from German side 1. FC Kaiserslautern for £130,000. American midfielder Dante Polvara left for St Louis City in the MLS for £150,000. Aberdeen were well beaten at Kilmarnock who were previously seventeen matches without a win.

=== February ===
With the transfer window closing, German midfielder Dennis Geiger joined on a loan deal from TSG Hoffenheim. Adil Aouchiche's loan was cut and he joined Schalke 04 with Leighton Clarkson also leaving for Blackpool for an undisclosed fee. The following day, defender Tom McIntyre joined having been released by Portsmouth with Peter Ambrose heading out on loan to Hungary. Having suffered a traumatic impact in the defeat at Kilmarnock, defender Mats Knoester was ruled out for a 'short to medium' term with the club. The home League match scheduled on February 4 against Celtic was postponed 4 hours before kick-off with part of the pitch unplayable due to persistent rain. The Scottish Cup match against Motherwell was postponed the day before the match. The away league fixture at Dundee United was also postponed. Part of the pitch was re-laid at Pittodrie in front of one of the goal-mouths. Alfie Bavidge, out on loan at Inverness, admitted his contract would not be renewed at the end of the season. Aberdeen finally played another game but lost at Motherwell in the league. However, they seen past them by the same score line in a hectic Cup match which seen three red cards, one for Geiger for the Dons. This set up a Saturday evening Quarter Final Cup tie at Dunfermline.

=== March ===
Despite an improved and spirited performance the Dons lost narrowly at home to Celtic. The Scottish Cup defence ended with a beleaguered and atrocious display against Championship side Dunfermline Athletic. This was Peter Leven's last match as interim manager with Tony Docherty also leaving as former St Mirren boss Stephen Robinson took the helm. However, his debut was ruined at home to Falkirk with a late equaliser. Relegation worries deepened with a convincing loss at Rangers. Aberdeen signed defender Elvis Bwomono & sold Sivert Heltne Nilsen to FK Haugesund.

=== April ===
The alarming decline continued as they slumped to another abject defeat at rejuvenated St Mirren on Stephen Robinson's return to Paisley. They eased their relegation concerns with their first League win since January, as Kevin Nisbet's double helped them see off 10-man Hibernian. Pre-match club legend Joe Harper was honoured in the clubs inaugural Legends Day. Boss Robinson was set to evaluate the squad over the remaining split fixtures. Defender Tom McIntyre returned to Portsmouth for treatment due to a hamstring injury ruling him out for the rest of the season. Findlay Marshall, on loan at Arbroath, signed a two-year deal. Afeez Aremu's deflected effort after 51 seconds was enough to see off Kilmarnock at home despite the away side hitting the bar three times.

=== May ===
Mitchel Frame's first senior goal and a Daniel Finlayson own goal put Aberdeen in front but Joel Nouble and substitute Robbie Muirhead netted equalisers for hosts Livingston in an entertaining Friday night draw which ultimately seen Livi relegated. A goal and assist from Toyosi Olusanya continued the club's improvement as they defeated Dundee United at Pittodrie. Stuart Armstrong and Dimitar Mitov underwent surgery and missed the remainder of the season. Jack Milne's alleged racist abuse towards Livingston's Bokila earlier in the season was 'not proven', says SFA. St Mirren earned a hard-fought win over Aberdeen - but it was not enough to prevent their place in the relegation play-off being confirmed. Dundee pipped Aberdeen to eighth after Ryan Astley crashed in a 90th-minute winner which also seen Mats Knoester injure his knee. The Dons were linked with Hibernian's Martin Boyle during the split fixtures but he signed a new deal. Aberdeen were winless away from home in 2026 and finished the Premiership League season in ninth place.

== Results & fixtures ==
Win Draw Loss Postponed

=== Pre-season ===
12 July 2025 Friendly	Cove Rangers	0–2	Aberdeen	Altens, Aberdeen
13:00 BST		Report	Palaversa 23'; Devlin 90'	Stadium: Balmoral Stadium; Attendance: 2200; Referee: Greg Soutar

19 July 2025 Friendly	Fulham	4–1	Aberdeen	Fulham, West London
	Wilson 19' (pen.), 37'; Muniz 52'; King 73'	Report	Yengi 2'	Stadium: Motspur Park – Fulham Training Ground; Attendance: 0

25 July 2025 Friendly	Aberdeen	1–3	Ipswich Town	Aberdeen, Scotland
19:30 BST	Ambrose 79'	Report	Philogene 28', 59'; Hirst 38'	Stadium: Pittodrie Stadium; Attendance: 12,694; Referee: Dan McFarlane

=== Scottish Premiership ===
4 August 2025 1	Heart of Midlothian	2–0	Aberdeen	Tynecastle Park
20:00	Shinnie 11' (o.g.); Findlay 73'			Attendance: 18,677; Referee: Nick Walsh
Note: Live on Sky Sports

10 August 2025 2	Aberdeen	0–2	Celtic	Pittodrie Stadium
12:30		Report	Nygren 27'; Hatate 66'	Attendance: 18,388; Referee: John Beaton
Note: Live on Sky Sports

31 August 2025 3	Aberdeen	0–1	Falkirk	Pittodrie Stadium
15:00	Devlin (red card) 43'	Report	Wilson 75'	Attendance: 18,380; Referee: Ross Hardie

13 September 2025 4	Aberdeen	0–0	Livingston	Pittodrie Stadium
15:00		Report		Attendance: 17,088; Referee: Nick Walsh

23 September 2025 5	Dundee United	2–0	Aberdeen	Tannadice Park
19:45	Dolček 45'; Esselink 50'	Report		Attendance: 11,052; Referee: Steven McLean
Note: Postponed due to Aberdeen's involvement in the UEFA Europa League play-off

27 September 2025 6	Motherwell	2–0	Aberdeen	Fir Park
15:00	Koutroumbis 90+2'; Stamatelopoulos 90+7' (pen.)	Report		Attendance: 7,195; Referee: Ryan Lee

5 October 2025 7	Aberdeen	4–0	Dundee	Pittodrie Stadium
15:00	Karlsson 22' (pen.), 63'; Aouchiche 30'; Gyamfi 33'	Report		Attendance: 16,525; Referee: Don Robertson

18 October 2025 8	St Mirren	0–1	Aberdeen	St Mirren Park
15:00	Richardson (red card) 81'	Report	Lazetić 90+6'	Attendance: 7,333; Referee: Lloyd Wilson

26 October 2025 9	Aberdeen	1–2	Hibernian	Pittodrie Stadium
14:30	Lazetić 90+4'	Report	Klidjé 34'; Youan 87'	Attendance: 18,227; Referee: Don Robertson

29 October 2025 10	Kilmarnock	0–1	Aberdeen	Rugby Park
19:45		Report	Armstrong 18'	Attendance: 5,118; Referee: Duncan Nicolson

9 November 2025 11	Aberdeen	1–1	Motherwell	Pittodrie Stadium
15:00	Karlsson 61'	Report	Just 64'	Attendance: 17,843; Referee: Steven McLean

23 November 2025 12	Aberdeen	1–0	Heart of Midlothian	Pittodrie Stadium
15:00	Keskinen 39'	Report		Attendance: 17,850; Referee: David Dickinson

30 November 2025 13	Livingston	0–1	Aberdeen	Almondvale Stadium
15:00		Report	Devlin 80'	Referee: Don Robertson

3 December 2025 14	Aberdeen	3–3	St Mirren	Pittodrie Stadium
19:45	Polvara 71'; Lazetić 73', 85'	Report	Fraser 55' (pen.); Ayunga 82'; King 90+9'	Attendance: 14,826; Referee: Steven McLean

6 December 2025 15	Dundee	1–3	Aberdeen	Dens Park
15:00	Astley 60'	Report	Aouchiche 17', 30'; Nisbet 90+2'	Attendance: 7,402; Referee: Grant Irvine

14 December 2025 16	Aberdeen	2–1	Kilmarnock	Pittodrie Stadium
15:00	Bilalović 79'; Karlsson 85' (pen.)	Report	John-Jules 17'	Attendance: 15,472; Referee: Ross Hardie

21 December 2025 17	Celtic	3–1	Aberdeen	Celtic Park
15:00	Nygren 39'; Tierney 88'; Forrest 90+2'	Report	Lobban (red card) 45+3'; Bilalović 74'	Attendance: 58,798; Referee: David Dickinson

27 December 2025 18	Aberdeen	1–1	Dundee United	Pittodrie Stadium
17:45	Karlsson 60'	Report	Fatah 30'	Attendance: 19,741; Referee: Calum Scott

30 December 2025 19	Hibernian	2–0	Aberdeen	Easter Road
19:45	Klidjé 60'; Hoilett 90+1'	Report		Attendance: 18,848; Referee: Dan McFarlane

3 January 2026 20	Falkirk	1–0	Aberdeen	Falkirk Stadium
15:00	Lissah 58'	Report		Attendance: 7,710; Referee: John Beaton

6 January 2026 21	Rangers	2–0	Aberdeen	Ibrox Stadium
20:00	Fernandez 11'; Raskin 41'	Report		Attendance: 50,375; Referee: Nick Walsh
Note: The fixture was rescheduled from 1 November 2025 due to Rangers' participation in the Scottish League Cup semi-finals.

11 January 2026 22	Aberdeen	0–2	Rangers	Pittodrie Stadium
16:30		Report	Aasgaard 23'; Tavernier 74' (pen.)	Attendance: 18,151; Referee: David Dickinson

24 January 2026 23	Aberdeen	6–2	Livingston	Pittodrie Stadium
15:00	Bilalović 9'; Nisbet 45+4', 45+8'; Milne (red card) 69'; Nilsen 75'; Keskinen 85', 90+2'	Report	Susoho 28'; Muirhead 31'; Bokila (red card) 70'	Attendance: 17,794; Referee: Ross Hardie

31 January 2026 24	Kilmarnock	3–0	Aberdeen	Rugby Park
15:00	Lyons 12'; Anderson 14'; John-Jules 59'	Report	Shinnie (red card) 51'	Attendance: 5,801; Referee: Lloyd Wilson

15 February 2026 25	Motherwell	2–0	Aberdeen	Fir Park
14:30	Just 28'; McIntyre 90+3' (o.g.)	Report		Attendance: 7,464; Referee: David Dickinson

21 February 2026 26	Aberdeen	2–3	Dundee	Pittodrie Stadium
15:00	Nisbet 13', 68'; Morrison (red card) 39'	Report	Murray 40' (pen.); Cotterill 45+1'; Hamilton 84'	Attendance: 17,327; Referee: Steven McLean

24 February 2026 27	Dundee United	0–0	Aberdeen	Tannadice Park
19:45		Report		Attendance: 10,006; Referee: Don Robertson

28 February 2026 28	Heart of Midlothian	1–0	Aberdeen	Tynecastle Park
15:00	Braga 28'	Report		Attendance: 18,788; Referee: Kevin Clancy

4 March 2026 29	Aberdeen	1–2	Celtic	Pittodrie Stadium
19:45	Nisbet 19' (pen.)	Report	Tierney 5'; Nygren 67'	Attendance: 17,592; Referee: Nick Walsh

14 March 2026 30	Aberdeen	1–1	Falkirk	Pittodrie Stadium
15:00	Nisbet 73'	Report	Stewart 89'	Attendance: 17,562; Referee: Calum Scott

21 March 2026 31	Rangers	4–1	Aberdeen	Ibrox Stadium
17:45	Chukwuani 35'; Moore 48'; Raskin 62'; Tavernier 90+6'	Report	Geiger 52'	Attendance: 50,970; Referee: Matthew MacDermid

4 April 2026 32	St Mirren	2–0	Aberdeen	St Mirren Park
15:00	Ayunga 40'; Gogić 83'	Report		Attendance: 7,653; Referee: Nick Walsh

11 April 2026 33	Aberdeen	2–0	Hibernian	Pittodrie Stadium
15:00	Nisbet 17' (pen.), 75'	Report	Hanley (red card) 16'	Attendance: 18,323; Referee: David Dickinson

25 April 2026 34	Aberdeen	1–0	Kilmarnock	Pittodrie Stadium
15:00	Aremu 1'	Report		Attendance: 16,600; Referee: Nick Walsh

1 May 2026 35	Livingston	2–2	Aberdeen	Almondvale Stadium
19:45	Nouble 47'; Muirhead 78'	Report	Frame 24'; Finlayson 71' (o.g.)	Attendance: 3,745; Referee: Calum Scott

9 May 2026 36	Aberdeen	2–0	Dundee United	Pittodrie Stadium
15:00	Armstrong 19'; Olusanya 88'	Report	Agyei (red card) 84'	Attendance: 18,163; Referee: Duncan Nicolson

12 May 2026 37	Aberdeen	0–2	St Mirren	Pittodrie Stadium
19:45		Report	King 42'; Phillips 80'	Attendance: 16,138; Referee: David Dickinson

17 May 2026 38	Dundee	3–2	Aberdeen	Dens Park
14:00	Wright 10'; Westley 61'; Astley 90'	Report	Morrison 23'; Olusanya 45+6'	Attendance: 8,279; Referee: Ross Hardie

=== Scottish League Cup ===
==== Knockout phase ====
16 August 2025 Second round	Greenock Morton	0–3	Aberdeen	Cappielow
15:00		Report	Heltne Nilsen 32'; Yengi 37'; Clarkson 79'	Attendance: 4,885; Referee: Matthew MacDermid

20 September 2025 Quarter-finals	Aberdeen	0–1	Motherwell	Pittodrie Stadium
15:00		Report	Charles-Cook 63'	Attendance: 10,533; Referee: John Beaton

=== Scottish Cup ===
18 January 2026 Fourth round	Aberdeen	1–0	Raith Rovers	Pittodrie Stadium
14:30	Milne 9'	Report		Attendance: 9,525; Referee: Kevin Clancy
Note: Game televised on BBC Scotland.

18 February 2026 Fifth round	Aberdeen	2–0	Motherwell	Pittodrie Stadium
19:45	Nisbet 4'; Geiger (red card) 23'; Shinnie 63'	Report	Priestman (red card) 3'; Gordon (red card) 48'	Attendance: 9,744; Referee: John Beaton
Note: Game televised on Premier Sports, originally postponed from 7 February.

7 March 2026 Quarter-finals	Dunfermline Athletic	3–0	Aberdeen	East End Park
19:30	M.Todd 14'; Thomas 22', 61'	Report		Attendance: 10,399; Referee: Ryan Lee

=== UEFA Europa League ===
==== Play-off round ====
21 August 2025 First leg	Aberdeen (Scotland)	2–2	FCSB (Romania)	Pittodrie Stadium
19:45	Polvara 61'; Sokler 89'	Report	Bîrligea 32'; Cisotti (red card) 38'; Olaru 46'	Attendance: 17,551; Referee: Serdar Gözübüyük

28 August 2025 Second leg	FCSB (Romania)	3–0 (5–2 agg.)	(Scotland) Aberdeen	Arena Națională
19:45	Olaru 45+1' (pen.), 59'; Șut 52'	Report	Jensen (red card) 44'	Attendance: 35,341; Referee: Espen Eskås

=== UEFA Conference League ===
==== League phase ====
2 October 2025 1	Aberdeen (Scotland)	2–3	(Ukraine) Shakhtar Donetsk	Pittodrie Stadium
20:00	Karlsson 8' (pen.); Devlin 69'	Report	Nazaryna 38'; Ferreira 54'; Henrique 59'	Attendance: 15,504; Referee: Duje Strukan

23 October 2025 2	AEK Athens (Greece)	6–0	(Scotland) Aberdeen	Agia Sophia Stadium
18:45	Koïta 11', 18'; Eliasson 27'; Marin 55'; Jović 81'; Kutesa 87'	Report		Attendance: 20,921; Referee: Jasper Vergoote

6 November 2025 3	AEK Larnaca (Cyprus)	0–0	(Scotland) Aberdeen	AEK Arena – Georgios Karapatakis
18:45		Report		Attendance: 4,770; Referee: Dalibor Cerny

27 November 2025 4	Aberdeen (Scotland)	1–1	(Armenia) Noah	Pittodrie Stadium
20:00	Nisbet 45'	Report	Mulahusejnović 52'	Attendance: 15,060; Referee: Paweł Raczkowski

11 December 2025 5	Aberdeen (Scotland)	0–1	(France) Strasbourg	Pittodrie Stadium
20:00		Report	Godo 35'	Attendance: 15,404; Referee: Robert Schröder

18 December 2025 6	Sparta Prague (Czech Republic)	3–0	(Scotland) Aberdeen	Stadion Letná
20:00	Mercado 16'; Haraslín 29'; Kuol 66'	Report		Attendance: 14,343; Referee: David Smajc

== Squad statistics ==
=== Appearances ===
As of 17 May 2026

No.	Pos	Player	Premiership		Scottish Cup		League Cup		Europe		Total	
No.	Pos	Player	Apps	Goals	Apps	Goals	Apps	Goals	Apps	Goals	Apps	Goals
1	GK	(Bulgaria) Dimitar Mitov	32	0	2	0	2	0	8	0	44	0
2	DF	(Scotland) Nicky Devlin	24+5	1	2	0	0+2	0	6+1	1	40	2
3	DF	(Scotland) Mitchel Frame	9+2	1	2+1	0	0	0	0	0	14	1
4	MF	(Scotland) Graeme Shinnie	18+13	0	2+1	1	1+1	0	3+5	0	44	1
5	DF	(Netherlands) Mats Knoester	26+2	0	0	0	1	0	7+1	0	37	0
6	MF	(Norway) Sivert Heltne Nilsen	6+8	1	0+3	0	1	1	1+3	0	22	2
8	MF	(Germany) Dennis Geiger	11+1	1	1	0	0	0	0	0	13	1
11	FW	(Australia) Nicolas Milanovic	5+10	0	3	0	1	0	1+4	0	24	0
13	GK	(Australia) Nicholas Suman	1	0	0	0	0	0	0	0	1	0
14	MF	(Sweden) Kenan Bilalović	7+11	3	0	0	0	0	0	0	18	3
15	FW	(Scotland) Kevin Nisbet	26+9	9	3	1	1	0	2+3	1	44	11
16	MF	(Scotland) Stuart Armstrong	24+4	2	2	0	1	0	4+1	0	36	2
18	MF	(Croatia) Ante Palaversa	5+9	0	0+1	0	1+1	0	4+1	0	22	0
20	FW	(England) Toyosi Olusanya	11+5	2	0+2	0	0	0	0	0	18	2
21	DF	(Republic of Ireland) Gavin Molloy	14+4	0	0+1	0	1	0	1	0	21	0
22	DF	(Scotland) Jack Milne	32+3	0	3	1	1	0	8	0	47	1
23	DF	(Scotland) Liam Morrison	13+1	1	0+1	0	0	0	0	0	15	1
24	DF	(Latvia) Kristers Tobers	1	0	0	0	0	0	0	0	1	0
25	MF	(Scotland) Lyall Cameron	10+4	0	3	0	0	0	0	0	17	0
26	DF	(Scotland) Tom McIntyre	3	0	2	0	0	0	0	0	5	0
27	FW	(Serbia) Marko Lazetić	9+17	4	0+2	0	0+1	0	4+2	0	35	4
28	DF	(Denmark) Alexander Jensen	21+6	0	0	0	1	0	0	0	28	0
29	MF	(Iceland) Kjartan Már Kjartansson	3+5	0	0	0	0	0	0	0	8	0
32	MF	(Nigeria) Afeez Aremu	9+1	1	0	0	0	0	0	0	10	1
38	DF	(Scotland) Dylan Lobban	10+4	0	1	0	0	0	4	0	19	0
41	GK	(Latvia) Rodrigo Vitols	0	0	0	0	0	0	0	0	0	0
42	DF	(Uganda) Elvis Bwomono	0+3	0	0	0	0	0	0	0	3	0
46	DF	(Scotland) Jamie Mercer	0	0	0	0	0	0	0	0	0	0
77	DF	(Germany) Emmanuel Gyamfi	12+1	1	0+1	0	1	0	0+2	0	17	1
81	FW	(Finland) Topi Keskinen	17+17	3	3	0	1+1	0	5+1	0	45	3
99	GK	(Norway) Per Kristian Bråtveit	5	0	1	0	0	0	0	0	6	0
Players who left the club during the season
7	MF	(France) Adil Aouchiche	16+4	3	0+1	0	1	0	7	0	29	3
8	MF	(United States) Dante Polvara	11+7	1	1	0	0+1	0	4+3	1	27	2
9	FW	(Australia) Kusini Yengi	3+1	0	0	0	1	1	1+4	0	10	1
10	MF	(England) Leighton Clarkson	3+10	0	1	0	0+2	1	2+4	0	22	1
17	MF	(Scotland) Fletcher Boyd	0+2	0	0	0	0+1	0	0	0	3	0
17	FW	(Sweden) Jesper Karlsson	16+2	5	0+1	0	1	0	6	1	26	6
19	FW	(Slovenia) Ester Sokler	0+2	0	0	0	0	0	1+1	1	4	1
20	FW	(England) Shayden Morris	0+2	0	0	0	1	0	0	0	3	0
23	MF	(Scotland) Ryan Duncan	0	0	0	0	0	0	0	0	0	0
26	DF	(England) Alfie Dorrington	3+3	0	0	0	2	0	3+3	0	14	0
32	FW	(Nigeria) Peter Ambrose	0	0	0	0	0	0	0	0	0	0

=== Goalscorers ===
As of 17 May 2026

Ranking	Nation	Number	Name	Scottish Premiership	Scottish Cup	League Cup	Europe	Total
1	(Scotland)	15	Kevin Nisbet	9	1	0	1	11
2	(Sweden)	17	Jesper Karlsson	5	0	0	1	6
=	(Serbia)	27	Marko Lazetić	4	0	0	0	4
4	(France)	7	Adil Aouchiche	3	0	0	0	3
=	(Sweden)	14	Kenan Bilalović	3	0	0	0	3
=	(Finland)	81	Topi Keskinen	3	0	0	0	3
7	(Scotland)	2	Nicky Devlin	1	0	0	1	2
=	(Norway)	6	Sivert Heltne Nilsen	1	0	1	0	2
=	(Scotland)	16	Stuart Armstrong	2	0	0	0	2
=	(England)	20	Toyosi Olusanya	2	0	0	0	2
=	(United States)	8	Dante Polvara	1	0	0	1	2
12	(Scotland)	3	Mitchel Frame	1	0	0	0	1
=	(Scotland)	4	Graeme Shinnie	0	1	0	0	1
=	(Germany)	8	Dennis Geiger	1	0	0	0	1
=	(Australia)	9	Kusini Yengi	0	0	1	0	1
=	(England)	10	Leighton Clarkson	0	0	1	0	1
=	(Slovenia)	19	Ester Sokler	0	0	0	1	1
=	(Scotland)	22	Jack Milne	0	1	0	0	1
=	(Scotland)	23	Liam Morrison	1	0	0	0	1
=	(Nigeria)	32	Afeez Aremu	1	0	0	0	1
=	(Germany)	77	Emmanuel Gyamfi	1	0	0	0	1
TOTALS				38	3	3	5	49

== Club statistics ==
=== Competition overview ===
Competition	First match	Last match	Record							
Competition	First match	Last match	Pld	W	D	L	GF	GA	GD	Win %
Premiership	4 August 2025	17 May 2026	38	11	7	20	40	55	−15	28.95
Scottish Cup	18 January 2026	7 March 2026	3	2	0	1	3	3	+0	66.67
League Cup	16 August 2025	20 September 2025	2	1	0	1	3	1	+2	50.00
Europa League	21 August 2025	28 August 2025	2	0	1	1	2	5	−3	0.00
Conference League	2 October 2025	18 December 2025	6	0	2	4	3	14	−11	0.00
Total			51	14	10	27	51	78	−27	27.45

Source: Competitions

=== League table ===
Pos	Team	Pld	W	D	L	GF	GA	GD	Pts	Qualification or relegation (Note: Teams played each other three times (33 matches), before the league was split into two groups (the top six and the bottom six).)
7	Dundee United	38	10	15	13	49	60	−11	45	
8	Dundee	38	11	9	18	42	61	−19	42	
9	Aberdeen	38	11	7	20	40	55	−15	40	
10	Kilmarnock	38	10	10	18	50	68	−18	40	
11	St Mirren (O)	38	8	10	20	30	55	−25	34	Qualification for the Premiership play-off final

Rules for classification: 1) Points; 2) Goal difference; 3) Goals scored; 4) Head-to-head points; 5) Head-to-head goal difference; 6) Play-off (only if deciding champion, UEFA competition qualification, second stage group allocation, or relegation).
(O) Play-off winners

=== Results by round ===
Round	1	2	3	4	5	6	7	8	9	10	11	12	13	14	15	16	17	18	19	20	21	22	23	24	25	26	27	28	29	30	31	32	33	34	35	36	37	38
Ground	A	H	H	H	A	A	H	A	H	A	H	H	A	H	A	H	A	H	A	A	A	H	H	A	A	H	A	A	H	H	A	A	H	H	A	H	H	A
Result	L	L	L	D	L	L	W	W	L	W	D	W	W	D	W	W	L	D	L	L	L	L	W	L	L	L	D	L	L	D	L	L	W	W	D	W	L	L
Position	12	12	12	12	12	12	12	11	11	9	8	8	7	7	6	6	6	6	7	8	8	8	7	7	8	8	8	8	8	9	9	9	8	8	8	8	8	9

Updated to match(es) played on 17 May 2026. Source:
A = Away; H = Home; W = Win; D = Draw; L = Loss

=== Conference League table ===
Pos	Team	Pld	W	D	L	GF	GA	GD	Pts
32	(Swedish Football Association) BK Häcken	6	0	3	3	5	8	−3	3
33	(Malta Football Association) Hamrun Spartans	6	1	0	5	4	11	−7	3
34	(Football Association of Ireland) Shelbourne	6	0	2	4	0	7	−7	2
35	(Scottish Football Association) Aberdeen	6	0	2	4	3	14	−11	2
36	(Austrian Football Association) Rapid Wien	6	0	1	5	3	14	−11	1

Source: UEFA
Rules for classification: League phase tiebreakers

== Transfers ==
=== Players in ===
Date	Pos	Player	From	Fee	Ref
15 May 2025	FW	(Australia) Nicolas Milanovic	(Australia) Western Sydney Wanderers	£385,000	
30 May 2025	GK	(Australia) Nicholas Suman	(Scotland) Cove Rangers	Free	
6 June 2025	DF	(Germany) Emmanuel Gyamfi	(Germany) FC Schalke 04	£200,000	
8 June 2025	FW	(Australia) Kusini Yengi	(England) Portsmouth	Free	
3 July 2025	MF	(Iceland) Kjartan Már Kjartansson	(Iceland) Stjarnan	Undisclosed	
14 August 2025	MF	(Sweden) Kenan Bilalović	(Sweden) Värnamo	£500,000	
18 August 2025	FW	(Serbia) Marko Lazetić	(Italy) AC Milan	Undisclosed	
30 August 2025	DF	(Scotland) Mitchel Frame	(Scotland) Celtic	£250,000	
1 September 2025	FW	(Scotland) Kevin Nisbet	(England) Millwall	£300,000	
3 September 2025	MF	(Scotland) Stuart Armstrong	(England) Sheffield Wednesday	Free	
23 January 2026	GK	(Norway) Per Kristian Bråtveit	(Norway) Strømsgodset	Free	
29 January 2026	MF	(Nigeria) Afeez Aremu	(Germany) Kaiserslautern	£150,000	
3 February 2026	DF	(Scotland) Tom McIntyre	(England) Portsmouth	Free	
27 March 2026	DF	(Uganda) Elvis Bwomono	(Iceland) ÍBV	Free	

=== Players out ===
Date	Pos	Player	To	Fee	Ref
29 May 2025	GK	(Scotland) Ross Doohan	(Scotland) Celtic	Free	
29 May 2025	GK	(Scotland) Tom Ritchie	(Scotland) Elgin City	Free	
29 May 2025	DF	(Scotland) Blair McKenzie	(Wales) Swansea City	Free	
29 May 2025	DF	(Scotland) Evan Towler	(Scotland) Montrose	Free	
29 May 2025	DF	(Scotland) Victor Enem	(Scotland) Arbroath	Free	
29 May 2025	FW	(Scotland) Fraser Mackie	(Scotland) Peterhead	Free	
30 May 2025	DF	(Scotland) Jack MacKenzie	(England) Plymouth Argyle	Free	
1 June 2025	FW	(Republic of Ireland) Jamie McGrath	(Scotland) Hibernian	Free	
2 June 2025	DF	(Scotland) Timothy Akindileni	(England) Queens Park Rangers	Undisclosed	
1 July 2025	DF	(New Zealand) James McGarry	(Australia) Brisbane Roar	Free	
31 July 2025	DF	(Finland) Richard Jensen	(Greece) Panionios	Free	
31 July 2025	FW	(Scotland) Cammy Wilson	(England) Derby County	Undisclosed	
1 August 2025	FW	(Senegal) Pape Habib Guèye	(Turkey) Kasımpaşa	£850,000	
20 August 2025	DF	(Montenegro) Slobodan Rubežić	(Poland) Korona Kielce	Undisclosed	
22 August 2025	MF	(Scotland) Ellis Clark	(England) Burnley	Undisclosed	
1 September 2025	FW	(England) Shayden Morris	(England) Luton Town	Undisclosed	
4 September 2025	FW	(Scotland) Fletcher Boyd	(England) Aston Villa	Undisclosed	
16 January 2026	FW	(Slovenia) Ester Sokler	(Serbia) Radnički 1923	Undisclosed	

=== Loans in ===
Date	Pos	Player	From	Length	Ref
6 July 2025	FW	(France) Adil Aouchiche	(England) Sunderland	Half-season loan	
19 July 2025	DF	(England) Alfie Dorrington	(England) Tottenham Hotspur	Half-season loan	
1 September 2025	FW	(Sweden) Jesper Karlsson	(Italy) Bologna	Half-season loan	
16 January 2026	MF	(Scotland) Lyall Cameron	(Scotland) Rangers	Half-season loan	
20 January 2026	DF	(Scotland) Liam Morrison	(England) Queens Park Rangers	Half-season loan	
23 January 2026	FW	(England) Toyosi Olusanya	(United States) Houston Dynamo	Half-season loan	
2 February 2026	MF	(Germany) Dennis Geiger	(Germany) TSG Hoffenheim	Half-season loan	

=== Loans out ===
Date	Pos	Player	To	Length	Ref
8 July 2025	MF	(Scotland) Finlay Marshall	(Scotland) Arbroath	Season Loan	
15 July 2025	DF	(Scotland) Jamie Mercer	(Scotland) Elgin City	Co-operation loan	
15 July 2025	DF	(Northern Ireland) Noah McDonnell	(Scotland) Elgin City	Co-operation loan	
15 July 2025	MF	(Scotland) Dylan Ross	(Scotland) Elgin City	Co-operation loan	
15 July 2025	DF	(Scotland) Lewis Carrol	(Scotland) Kelty Hearts	Co-operation loan	
15 July 2025	MF	(Scotland) Cooper Masson	(Scotland) Kelty Hearts	Co-operation loan	
15 July 2025	FW	(Scotland) Joseph Teasdale	(Scotland) Kelty Hearts	Co-operation loan	
15 July 2025	MF	(Scotland) Alfie Stewart	(Scotland) Inverness CT	Half–season loan	
18 July 2025	MF	(Scotland) Aaron Cummings	(Scotland) Buckie Thistle	Season Loan	
18 July 2025	GK	(Scotland) Theo Simpson	(Scotland) Buckie Thistle	Season Loan	
23 July 2025	FW	(Netherlands) Vicente Besuijen	(Finland) HJK Helsinki	Half–season loan	
1 August 2025	FW	(Scotland) Alfie Bavidge	(Scotland) Inverness CT	Season Loan	
3 September 2025	FW	(Slovenia) Ester Sokler	(Serbia) Radnički 1923	Half-season Loan	
30 September 2025	MF	(Scotland) Ryan Duncan	(Scotland) Ross County	Season Loan	
15 January 2026	FW	(Netherlands) Vicente Besuijen	(Netherlands) FC Emmen	Half–season loan	
29 January 2026	FW	(Australia) Kusini Yengi	(Japan) Cerezo Osaka	Half–season loan	
3 February 2026	FW	(Nigeria) Peter Ambrose	(Hungary) Diósgyőri VTK	Half–season loan	

== See also ==
- List of Aberdeen F.C. seasons
