= Ester Sokler =

Slovenian footballer (born 1999)

Personal information
- Date of birth: 4 June 1999 (age 27)
- Place of birth: Krško, Slovenia
- Height: 5 ft 10 in (1.78 m)
- Position: Striker

Team information
- Current team: Maccabi Tel Aviv
- Number: 9

Youth career
- 2007–2016: Krško

Senior career*
Years	Team	Apps	(Gls)
2016–2020	Krško	55	(5)
2020–2021	Brežice 1919	11	(6)
2021–2022	Celje	44	(9)
2022–2023	Radomlje	30	(10)
2023–2026	Aberdeen	49	(3)
2025–2026	→ Radnički 1923 (loan)	12	(6)
2026	Radnički 1923	18	(9)
2026–	Maccabi Tel Aviv	7	(2)

International career^{‡}
2016	Slovenia U17	3	(0)
2017	Slovenia U18	7	(1)
2017	Slovenia U19	2	(0)
2019	Slovenia U21	1	(0)
2026–	Slovenia	1	(0)
- * Club domestic league appearances and goals as of 19 October 2026 ‡ National team caps and goals as of 4 June 2026

Ester Sokler (born 4 June 1999) is a Slovenian professional footballer who plays as a striker for Israeli Premier League club Maccabi Tel Aviv and the Slovenia national team.

== Youth career ==
Born in Krško and growing up in Brestanica, Sokler started his playing career at the age of six at the football school Nogobikci, before joining the youth sector of his hometown club NK Krško. He came through the club's youth ranks, as he won the under-13 and under-15 national championship in 2012 and 2014, respectively.

== Club career ==
Having been promoted to the Krško senior squad in 2016 at age 17, Sokler made his Slovenian PrvaLiga debut on 26 November 2016 in a 4–0 defeat against Maribor.

In July 2020, Sokler joined Slovenian Second League side Brežice 1919, where he spent six months, before returning to PrvaLiga in December 2020, having signed a contract with Celje until 2023.

After two seasons at Celje, Sokler joined fellow Slovenian top-tier club Radomlje on a permanent deal in July 2022. He scored 10 goals in 31 games in his first season with Radomlje, as they finished seventh in the league.

On 16 June 2023, Sokler joined Scottish Premiership club Aberdeen for an undisclosed fee, signing a three-year deal.

In September 2025, he went on a season-long loan to Serbian SuperLiga club Radnički 1923. After scoring six goals in twelve appearances during the first part of the season, the move was made permanent in January 2026 for an undisclosed sum.

In July 2026, Sokler signed for Israeli Premier League club Maccabi Tel Aviv on a two-year contract, with the option to extend for two more years.

== International career ==
Sokler was a Slovenian youth international and represented the country at the under-17, under-18, under-19 and under-21 levels.

He was called up to the senior team for a pair of friendly matches in June 2026 and made his debut in a 1–1 draw against Cyprus on 4 June, coming on as a second-half substitute in place of Žan Vipotnik.

== Personal life ==
Sokler has cited Wayne Rooney as his childhood footballing idol. In a 2023 interview, he claimed that he has often been mistaken for a woman, as Ester is actually a female given name in many countries, including Slovenia itself. According to him, his parents likely chose to name him after the song "Moja teta Estera" by Slovenian band Mi2.

== Career statistics ==
As of match played 24 May 2026

Appearances and goals by club, season and competition
Club	Season	League			National cup (Note: Includes Slovenian Football Cup, Scottish Cup)		League cup (Note: Includes Scottish League Cup)		Other		Total	
Club	Season	Division	Apps	Goals	Apps	Goals	Apps	Goals	Apps	Goals	Apps	Goals
Krško	2016–17	Slovenian PrvaLiga	3	0	0	0	—		—		3	0
Krško	2017–18	Slovenian PrvaLiga	12	1	0	0	—		—		12	1
Krško	2018–19	Slovenian PrvaLiga	24	0	2	0	—		—		26	0
Krško	2019–20	Slovenian Second League	16	4	1	0	—		—		17	4
Krško	Total		55	5	3	0	0	0	0	0	58	5
Brežice 1919	2020–21	Slovenian Second League	11	6	1	3	—		—		12	9
Celje	2020–21	Slovenian PrvaLiga	14	3	4	0	—		—		18	3
Celje	2021–22	Slovenian PrvaLiga	30	6	2	1	—		—		32	7
Celje	Total		44	9	6	1	0	0	0	0	50	10
Radomlje	2022–23	Slovenian PrvaLiga	30	10	1	0	—		—		31	10
Aberdeen	2023–24	Scottish Premiership	26	1	3	1	4	1	7 (Note: Two appearances in UEFA Europa League, five appearances and one goal in UEFA Europa Conference League)	1	40	4
Aberdeen	2024–25	Scottish Premiership	21	2	0	0	7	5	0	0	28	7
Aberdeen	2025–26	Scottish Premiership	2	0	0	0	0	0	2 (Note: Appearances in UEFA Europa League)	1	4	1
Aberdeen	Total		49	3	3	1	11	6	9	2	72	12
Radnički 1923 (loan)	2025–26	Serbian SuperLiga	12	6	0	0	—		—		12	6
Radnički 1923	2025–26	Serbian SuperLiga	17	9	0	0	—		—		17	9
Career total			218	48	14	5	11	6	9	2	252	61
