= Afeez Aremu =

Nigerian footballer (born 1999)

Personal information
- Full name: Afeez Aremu Olalekan
- Date of birth: 3 October 1999 (age 27)
- Place of birth: Ibadan, Nigeria
- Height: 1.81 m (5 ft 11 in)
- Position: Midfielder

Team information
- Current team: Aberdeen
- Number: 32

Youth career
- 2013–2014: Remo Stars
- 2014–2015: Sharks

Senior career*
Years	Team	Apps	(Gls)
2015–2016	Sunshine Stars	15	(2)
2016	Rivers United	13	(1)
2017–2018	Akwa United	9	(0)
2018–2020	IK Start	55	(4)
2020–2023	FC St. Pauli	54	(0)
2023–2026	1. FC Kaiserslautern	25	(0)
2026–	Aberdeen	10	(1)

International career^{‡}
2014–2015	Nigeria U20		
2017	Nigeria	1	(0)
- * Club domestic league appearances and goals as of 20 May 2026 ‡ National team caps and goals as of 09:42, 31 August 2020 (UTC)

Afeez Aremu Olalekan(born 3 October 1999) is a Nigerian professional footballer who plays as a midfielder for Scottish Premiership club Aberdeen. He has also played for the Nigeria national under-20 team.

== Career ==
Aremu was born in Ibadan, Nigeria. He made his league debut with Remo Stars F.C. at the age of 14 in 2013–14 Nigeria National Pro League season during their terrain in the Nigerian Second Division League. He has played for several Nigeria Premier League teams, such as Sharks F.C. from where he played against Sunshine Stars F.C. and this made Sunshine Stars sign him. He got stronger interest from Rivers United F.C. after he played against them during the first leg of 2015–16 Nigeria Premier League season and was signed during the mid season. He won the man of the match again towards two games to the end of 2015–16 Nigeria Premier League season when Rivers United played against Akwa United F.C. and this also made Akwa United sign him in the 2017 Nigeria Premier League season.

In August 2020, Aremu joined 2. Bundesliga side FC St. Pauli from Eliteserien club IK Start on a three-year contract. The transfer fee paid to IK Start was undisclosed.

Having featured less since the arrival of manager Fabian Hürzeler, Aremu moved to league rivals 1. FC Kaiserslautern in August 2023. The transfer was reported as being in the mid-six-figure range.

On 29 January 2026, Aremu moved to Aberdeen in Scotland on a two-and-a-half-year contract.

== Personal life ==
Aremu has Yoruba tribal marks on his face, he had them since he was a baby.

== Career statistics ==
As of match played 1 July 2026

Appearances and goals by club, season and competition
Club	Season	League			National cup		League cup		Total	
Club	Season	Division	Apps	Goals	Apps	Goals	Apps	Goals	Apps	Goals
Sunshine Stars	2015	NPFL	15	2	0	0	–		15	2
Rivers United	2016	NPFL	13	1	0	0	–		13	1
Akwa United	2017	NPFL	9	0	0	0	–		9	0
Start	2018	Eliteserien	26	3	4	1	–		30	4
Start	2019	OBOS-ligaen	25	1	1	0	–		26	1
Start	2020	Eliteserien	4	0	0	0	–		4	0
Start	Total		55	4	5	1	0	0	60	5
FC St. Pauli	2020–21	2. Bundesliga	16	0	1	0	–		17	0
FC St. Pauli	2021–22	2. Bundesliga	21	0	3	0	–		24	0
FC St. Pauli	2022–23	2. Bundesliga	17	0	1	0	–		18	0
FC St. Pauli	Total		54	0	5	0	0	0	59	0
1. FC Kaiserslautern	2023–24	2. Bundesliga	5	0	0	0	–		5	0
1. FC Kaiserslautern	2024–25	2. Bundesliga	12	0	0	0	–		12	0
1. FC Kaiserslautern	2025–26	2. Bundesliga	8	0	3	0	–		11	0
1. FC Kaiserslautern	Total		25	0	3	0	0	0	28	0
Aberdeen	2025–26	Scottish Premiership	10	1	0	0	–		10	1
Aberdeen	2026–27	Scottish Premiership	0	0	0	0	0	0	0	0
Aberdeen	Total		10	1	0	0	0	0	10	1
Career total			181	8	13	1	0	0	194	9
