= Dylan Lobban =

Scottish footballer

Personal information
- Full name: Dylan Lobban
- Date of birth: 26 August 2005 (age 21)
- Place of birth: Aberdeen, Scotland
- Positions: Right-back; right wing-back

Team information
- Current team: Dunfermline (on loan from Aberdeen)
- Number: 24

Youth career
- –2021: Aberdeen

Senior career*
| Years | Team | Apps | (Gls) |
| 2021– | Aberdeen | 14 | (0) |
| 2023 | → Formartine United (loan) | | |
| 2024 | → Forfar Athletic (loan) | 8 | (0) |
| 2024–2025 | → Cove Rangers (loan) | 27 | (2) |
| 2026– | → Dunfermline (loan) | 0 | (0) |

International career
| 2021–2022 | Scotland U17 | 8 | (0) |
| 2023 | Scotland U19 | 2 | (0) |
- * Club domestic league appearances and goals as of 07:48, 13 May 2026 (UTC)

Dylan Lobban (born 26 August 2005) is a Scottish footballer who plays as a right-back or right wing-back for Scottish Championship club Dunfermline, on loan from Scottish Premiership club Aberdeen.

== Club career ==
=== Youth career and Aberdeen ===
Lobban began his career with the Aberdeen youth team, where he captained the U18s, before making his senior debut on 6 July 2022 in a 7–1 friendly win against Highland Football league side Brechin City, coming off the bench. Lobban signed a contract on 18 January 2024 that would see him at the club until 2026. He captained an Aberdeen development squad that won the Aberdeenshire Cup on 3 October 2025. Following this, Lobban signed a new contract to stay with Aberdeen until the summer of 2028. In August 2026, Lobban signed another contract that would keep him at Aberdeen until the summer of 2029.

=== Formartine United ===
On 4 August 2023, Lobban signed on loan with Highland Football League side Formartine until January.

=== Forfar Athletic ===
On 5 January 2024, Lobban moved on loan to Scottish League 2 side Forfar Athletic until the end of the season.

=== Cove Rangers ===
On 28 September 2024, Lobban signed on loan with Cove Rangers for an initial half season for the 2024–25 season. However this loan was then extended until the end of the season on the 10 January 2025.

== International career ==
Lobban was called up to the Scotland under-17 team in 2021. He made his debut on 2 September 2021, in an international friendly against Wales, coming off the bench in the 62nd minute. The game ended in a 1–1 draw.

He has since moved into the Scotland U19 team, making a further 9 youth team appearances for his country.

== Career statistics ==
As of match played 12 May 2026

Appearances and goals by club, season and competition
| Club | Season | League | | | National cup | | League cup | | Other | | Total | |
| Club | Season | Division | Apps | Goals | Apps | Goals | Apps | Goals | Apps | Goals | Apps | Goals |
|---|---|---|---|---|---|---|---|---|---|---|---|---|
| Formartine United | 2023–24 | Highland Football League | 1 | 0 | 2 | 0 | 0 | 0 | - | | 3 | 0 |
| Forfar Athletic | 2023–24 | Scottish League Two | 8 | 0 | 0 | 0 | 0 | 0 | - | | 8 | |
| Forfar Athletic | Total | | 9 | 0 | 2 | 0 | 0 | 0 | 0 | 0 | 11 | 0 |
| Cove Rangers | 2024–25 | Scottish League One | 27 | 2 | 2 | 0 | 0 | 0 | 4 | 0 | 33 | 2 |
| Cove Rangers | Total | | 27 | 2 | 2 | 0 | 0 | 0 | 4 | 0 | 33 | 2 |
| Aberdeen | 2025–26 | Scottish Premiership | 14 | 0 | 1 | 0 | 0 | 0 | - | | 1 | 0 |
| Aberdeen | Total | | 14 | 0 | 1 | 0 | 0 | 0 | 0 | 0 | 1 | 0 |
| Career total | | | 50 | 2 | 5 | 0 | 0 | 0 | 4 | 0 | 45 | 2 |
