= Emmanuel Gyamfi (footballer, born 2004) =

German footballer (born 2003)

Personal information
- Date of birth: 23 July 2004 (age 22)
- Place of birth: Hemer, Germany
- Height: 1.78 m (5 ft 10 in)
- Position: Left midfielder

Team information
- Current team: Aberdeen
- Number: 77

Youth career
- 2010–2013: VfR 08 Oberhausen
- 2013: VfB Speldorf
- 2014–2017: SGS Essen
- 2017–2019: Fortuna Düsseldorf
- 2019–2023: Schalke 04

Senior career*
Years	Team	Apps	(Gls)
2023–2025	Schalke 04 II	21	(1)
2024–2025	Schalke 04	0	(0)
2024–2025	→ VVV-Venlo (loan)	30	(0)
2025–	Aberdeen	13	(1)
- * Club domestic league appearances and goals as of 20 May 2026

Emmanuel Gyamfi (born 23 July 2004) is a German professional footballer who plays as a left midfielder for Scottish Premiership club Aberdeen

== Career ==
After playing one season for Schalke II, Gyamfi signed a professional four-year contract with Schalke 04 on 16 May 2024.

On 26 June 2024, he was loaned to VVV-Venlo for the 2024–25 season. He made his professional debut for the club in a 1–1 away draw against ADO Den Haag on 10 August 2024.

On 6th June 2025, he signed for 2025 Scottish Cup Winners Aberdeen on a four year contract.

== Career statistics ==
As of match played 5 October 2025

Appearances and goals by club, season and competition
Club	Season	League			Cup		League Cup		Europe		Total	
Club	Season	Division	Apps	Goals	Apps	Goals	Apps	Goals	Apps	Goals	Apps	Goals
Schalke 04 II	2023–24	Regionalliga West	21	1	—		—		—		21	1
VVV-Venlo (loan)	2024–25	Eerste Divisie	30	0	1	0	—		—		31	0
Aberdeen	2025–26	Scottish Premiership	4	1	0	0	1	0	0	0	5	1
Career total			55	2	1	0	1	0	0	0	57	2
