= Kenan Bilalović =

Swedish footballer (born 2005)

Personal information
- Date of birth: 22 June 2005 (age 21)
- Position: Winger

Team information
- Current team: Aberdeen
- Number: 14

Youth career
- IFK Värnamo

Senior career*
Years	Team	Apps	(Gls)
2022–2025	IFK Värnamo	33	(1)
2024	→ Skövde AIK (loan)	8	(0)
2025–	Aberdeen	18	(3)
2026-	→ MŠK Žilina (loan)	7	(3)

International career^{‡}
2023	Sweden U19	2	(0)
2025	Sweden U21	2	(0)
- * Club domestic league appearances and goals as of 20:21, 17 November 2026 (UTC) ‡ National team caps and goals as of 09:41, 24 August 2025 (UTC)

Kenan Bilalović (born 22 June 2005) is a Swedish professional footballer who plays as a winger for MŠK Žilina on loan from Aberdeen.

== Club career ==
As a youth player, Bilalović joined the youth academy of Swedish side IFK Värnamo and was promoted to the club's senior team ahead of the 2023 season, where he made thirty-three league appearances and scored one goal.

During the summer of 2024, he was sent on loan to Swedish side Skövde AIK, where he made eight league appearances and scored zero goals. Following his stint there, he signed for Scottish side Aberdeen in 2025. On 14 December 2025 he scored his first goal for the club vs Kilmarnock.

== International career ==
Born in Sweden, Bilalović is of Bosnian descent. He is a Sweden youth international. On 15 June 2023, he debuted for the Sweden national under-18 football team during a 1–0 friendly away win over the Wales national under-18 football team.

== Style of play ==
Bilalović plays as a winger and is left-footed. Scottish newspaper The Press and Journal wrote in 2025 that he "although his previous five starts for Varnamo came on the right flank... Bilalovic... is recognised more as a left-winger... [his] left foot is his stronger one, so would be better suited to hitting the byeline and getting crosses in from the left side".
