= Jack Milne (footballer) =

Scottish footballer

Personal information
- Date of birth: 10 February 2003 (age 23)
- Place of birth: Aberdeen, Scotland
- Height: 1.92 m (6 ft 4 in)
- Position: Centre-back

Team information
- Current team: Aberdeen
- Number: 22

Youth career
- 2014–2021: Aberdeen

Senior career*
| Years | Team | Apps | (Gls) |
| 2021– | Aberdeen | 51 | (0) |
| 2021–2022 | → Brechin City (loan) | 13 | (2) |
| 2023 | → Kelty Hearts (loan) | 15 | (0) |

International career^{‡}
| 2024 | Scotland U21 | 2 | (0) |
- * Club domestic league appearances and goals as of 20 May 2026 ‡ National team caps and goals as of 25 May 2025

Jack Milne (born 10 February 2003) is a Scottish professional footballer who plays for Scottish Premiership side Aberdeen. He has also played for Brechin City and Kelty Hearts on loan. Originally a central midfielder, then a holding midfielder, Milne was successfully converted into a central defender.

== Career ==
Born in Aberdeen, Milne attended the SFA Performance School at Hazlehead Academy and the Aberdeen Youth Academy at Under 12s aged 11 years old, and was rewarded with a full time contract in the summer of 2020. He played one year at Under 18s, before being loaned out to Highland League side Brechin City for the first half of the 2021–22 campaign. He also impressed whilst playing for the Aberdeen B-team in their SPFL Trust Trophy games.

He made his senior debut for Aberdeen in a Scottish League Cup Group Stage match against Peterhead on 10 July 2022. He made his Scottish Premiership debut on 1 October 2022, coming on as a second-half substitute in a 4–1 win against Kilmarnock.

On 12 January 2023, Milne joined Scottish League One club Kelty Hearts on loan until the end of the season.

In May 2026, Milne was accused of racism during a game towards Livingston striker Jeremy Bokila; the allegation was "not proven".

== Career statistics ==
As of match played 19 May 2024

Appearances and goals by club, season and competition
| Club | Season | League | | | National Cup | | League Cup | | Other | | Total | |
| Club | Season | Division | Apps | Goals | Apps | Goals | Apps | Goals | Apps | Goals | Apps | Goals |
|---|---|---|---|---|---|---|---|---|---|---|---|---|
| Aberdeen | 2021–22 | Scottish Premiership | 0 | 0 | 0 | 0 | 0 | 0 | 0 | 0 | 0 | 0 |
| Aberdeen | 2022–23 | Scottish Premiership | 1 | 0 | 0 | 0 | 0 | 0 | 0 | 0 | 1 | 0 |
| Aberdeen | 2023–24 | Scottish Premiership | 6 | 0 | 2 | 0 | 0 | 0 | 2 | 0 | 10 | 0 |
| Aberdeen | Total | | 7 | 0 | 2 | 0 | 0 | 0 | 2 | 0 | 11 | 0 |
| Brechin City (loan) | 2021–22 | Highland League | 13 | 2 | 1 | 0 | – | | 3 | 0 | 17 | 2 |
| Kelty Hearts (loan) | 2022–23 | Scottish League 1 | 15 | 0 | 0 | 0 | 0 | 0 | 1 | 0 | 16 | 0 |
| Career total | | | 35 | 2 | 3 | 0 | 0 | 0 | 6 | 0 | 44 | 2 |

== Honours ==
Aberdeen

- Scottish Cup: 2024–25
