= Mitchel Frame =

Scottish footballer

Personal information
- Date of birth: 25 January 2006 (age 20)
- Place of birth: Drongan, Scotland
- Position: Left-back

Team information
- Current team: Aberdeen
- Number: 3

Youth career
- 2016–2023: Celtic

Senior career*
Years	Team	Apps	(Gls)
2023–2025	Celtic	0	(0)
2025–	Aberdeen	11	(1)

International career^{‡}
2022–2023	Scotland U17	5	(0)
2023–	Scotland U19	7	(0)
- * Club domestic league appearances and goals as of 20 May 2026 ‡ National team caps and goals as of 22:06, 9 December 2023 (UTC)

Mitchel Frame (born 25 January 2006) is a Scottish professional footballer who plays as a left-back for Aberdeen.

== Club career ==
Frame is a youth product of Celtic, having joined at the age of 9. On 1 July 2022, he signed his first developmental contract with the club and joined their B-team.

Frame earned an opportunity to join the senior team for the preseason of the summer of 2023. He impressed further as on 29 September 2023, he extended his contract with the club until 2026 and signed professionally.

He made his senior and professional debut with Celtic as a substitute in a 2–1 UEFA Champions League win over Feyenoord on 13 December 2023.

In August 2025, Frame joined Aberdeen on a four-year deal.

After months of hard work, Frame made his competitive debut for Aberdeen on 18 January 2026, coming on as a substitute in a 1–0 Scottish Cup victory over Raith Rovers at Pittodrie.

== International career ==
Frame is a youth international for Scotland, having played for the Scotland U17s at the 2022 UEFA European Under-17 Championship.

He was also part of the Scotland U19s that played for 2024 UEFA European Under-19 Championship qualification.
