= Aberdeen F.C. =

Association football club in Scotland

Aberdeen
- Full name: Aberdeen Football Club
- Nicknames: The Dons; The Dandies; The Reds
- Founded: 14 April 1903; 123 years ago
- Ground: Pittodrie Stadium
- Capacity: 19,274
- Coordinates: 57°9′33″N 2°5′20″W
- Chairman: Dave Cormack
- Head coach: Mario Frick
- League: Scottish Premiership
- 2025–26: Scottish Premiership, 9th of 12
- Website: afc.co.uk
Home colours	Away colours

Aberdeen Football Club is a Scottish professional football club based in Aberdeen, Scotland. They compete in the Scottish Premiership and have never been relegated from the top division of the Scottish football league system since they were elected to the top flight in 1905. Aberdeen have won four Scottish league titles, eight Scottish Cups and six Scottish League Cups. They are also the only Scottish team to have won two European trophies, having won the European Cup Winners' Cup and the European Super Cup in 1983.

Formed in 1903 as a result of the amalgamation of three clubs from Aberdeen, they rarely challenged for honours until the post-war decade, when they won each of the major Scottish trophies under manager Dave Halliday. This level of success was surpassed in the 1980s, when, under the management of Alex Ferguson, they won three league titles, four Scottish Cups and a Scottish League Cup, alongside the two European trophies. Aberdeen were the last club outside the Old Firm to win a league title, in 1984–85, and also the last Scottish team to win a European trophy. They have enjoyed less success since this golden era, though in the 2010s, the club ended a 19-year wait for a major trophy by winning the 2013–14 Scottish League Cup; this was followed by four consecutive seasons of finishing second behind Celtic in the league. More triumph came in 2025 as they won the Scottish Cup for the first time in 35 years.

Aberdeen have played at Pittodrie Stadium since their inception. The ground has a capacity of 19,274, and was the first all-seated and all-covered stadium in the United Kingdom. Pittodrie was also the first football stadium to feature a dug-out, an invention of player and coach Donald Colman.

The club's colours have been primarily red and white since 1939; before this, they played in black and gold vertical stripes. In modern times, Aberdeen have almost exclusively played with all-red strips with white detailing. Aberdeen attract support from the city and surrounding areas, as they have no geographically close rivals. Lacking a local competitor, Aberdeen have instead developed rivalries with more distant opponents such as Dundee United (collectively known as the "New Firm" in the 1980s) and Rangers.

== History ==
=== Formation and early years (1903–1939) ===
League history of Aberdeen from their first league appearance in 1904

Before Aberdeen FC formed, in 1902 Edinburgh based Hibernian, unsettled in the capital, were looking to move to Aberdeen, even going as far as sending a valuer to Pittodrie to decide if the move was plausible. This kickstarted talks of a merger between three clubs based in the city—Aberdeen, Victoria United and Orion—in 1903. The three clubs came to an agreement and the new Aberdeen FC was formed. The new club played its first match on 15 August 1903: a 1–1 draw with Stenhousemuir. That first season produced a win in the Aberdeenshire Cup, but only a third-place finish in the Northern League. The club applied for membership of the Scottish League for the following season, and were elected to the Second Division.

In 1904, the club were managed by Jimmy Philip. At the end of its first season, despite having finished seventh out of twelve teams, Aberdeen were elected to the new, expanded First Division. They have remained in the top tier of Scottish football ever since. From 1906, the club made steady progress, with a Scottish Cup semi-final appearance in 1908 and another in 1911. In that season of 1910–11, Aberdeen recorded their first victories over the Old Firm of Celtic and Rangers, and led the league for a time, but finished the season in second place.

Wartime affected the club as much as any other; despite spending cuts and other economies, by 1917 the situation became untenable. Aberdeen dropped out of competitive football, along with Dundee and Raith Rovers. Senior football returned on 16 August 1919, and Aberdeen resumed with a fixture against Albion Rovers. Philip was still in charge, and continued to oversee a team capable of isolated good results, but never quite able to sustain a challenge long enough to win a trophy. In 1923, Aberdeen were drawn against Peterhead in the Scottish Cup, and posted their record score—a 13–0 victory. Philip retired a year later, and was replaced as manager by Paddy Travers. He presided over the team's first Scottish Cup final in 1937.

Travers' "trainer"—first team coach in modern parlance—was former player Donald Colman. Colman conceived the dug-out, a covered area set slightly below the level of the playing surface to better aid his observations. Everton visited Pittodrie soon after its introduction, and exported the idea to the English leagues, from where it spread throughout the football-playing world. Travers left to become manager of Clyde in 1939.

=== Halliday to McNeill (1939–1978) ===
Travers was replaced by former Yeovil Town manager Dave Halliday, one of more than a hundred applicants for the role, and the club moved from their black and gold strip to red and white. Halliday had barely begun his work when World War II halted competitive football in the United Kingdom. For these six years, the club was temporarily taken over by then-directors Charles B Forbes and George Anderson while Halliday served in the war.

Halliday's place in the Aberdeen Hall of Fame was secured after the war when he became the first manager to bring national trophies to Pittodrie. Aberdeen won the Southern League Cup in the 1945–46 season, defeating Rangers 3–2 at Hampden. They then reached the 1947 Scottish Cup final, defeating Hibernian 2–1 with George Hamilton, signed from Halliday's former club Queen of the South, scoring to gain the club's first major trophy. From this early success, Halliday's side reached two more Scottish Cup finals, in 1953 and 1954, though they lost both. Halliday's team were not to be denied, however, and the following season, 1954–55, Aberdeen won their first Scottish League title. Though league winners, the club did not participate in the first European Cup competition—Scotland's place was awarded to Hibernian, who took part by special invitation.

Halliday and Hamilton left at the end of that championship-winning season, and Halliday was replaced by Davie Shaw. Aberdeen won the League Cup under his guidance, beating St Mirren in 1955–56, and reached another Scottish Cup final in 1959. However, Shaw stepped aside for another former favourite player, Tommy Pearson, in 1959. Pearson's time in charge coincided with a high turnover of players, and yielded no trophies. He retired in 1965, making way for Eddie Turnbull.

Turnbull led Aberdeen to the 1967 Scottish Cup final, where the side was ultimately defeated by Celtic. Despite this loss, Aberdeen qualified for the European Cup Winner's Cup in the following season thanks to their appearance in this final, the first time the club had competed in European competition. Their first tie was a 14–1 aggregate victory over KR Reykjavik, although they lost the second round tie with Standard Liège 3–2 on aggregate. Two years later, Derek "Cup-tie" McKay recorded the only four goals of his Aberdeen career to help his team to the 1969–70 Scottish Cup, scoring the winning goals in the quarter- and semi-final, and two in the final itself. As Scottish Cup holders, Aberdeen once again qualified for the same competition, but were eliminated in the first round following a 4–4 aggregate tie with Honvéd. This tie, level after extra time and also level on away goals, was decided by the first penalty shoot-out in UEFA competition history, Honvéd winning the shootout 5–4 in Budapest.

The Aberdeen side of the 1970s regularly challenged for domestic honours. However, they rarely won trophies, with the exception of the Drybrough Cup in 1971 under Jimmy Bonthrone and the League Cup in 1976, under Ally MacLeod. During this decade, Aberdeen had five managers: Eddie Turnbull, Jimmy Bonthrone, Ally MacLeod, Billy McNeill and Alex Ferguson. They reached two more national cup finals—the Scottish Cup in 1978 under Billy McNeill and the League Cup in the following season under the new manager Alex Ferguson.

=== Alex Ferguson era (1978–1986) ===
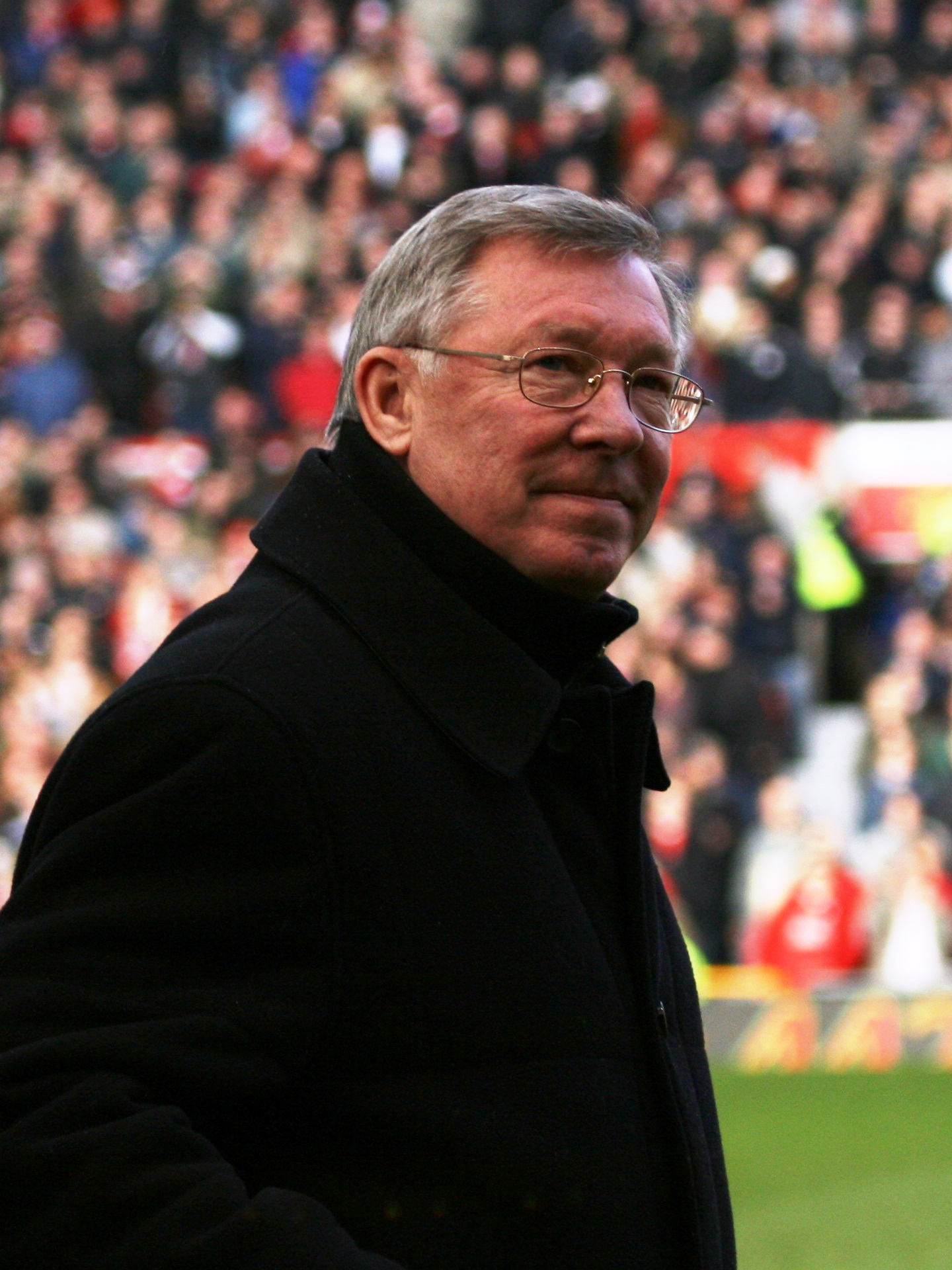
Alex Ferguson, the most successful manager of Aberdeen, pictured at his last club Manchester United

Under Ferguson's guidance, the club won three league championships, four Scottish Cups, one League Cup, the European Cup Winner's Cup, the European Super Cup and a Drybrough Cup—all in the space of seven years. Players such as Jim Leighton, Willie Miller, Alex McLeish and Gordon Strachan became the backbone of the team. Aberdeen's second League title was won in 1979–80 and this initial success was built upon with Scottish Cup wins in three successive seasons from 1982 to 1984, and two more league titles in 1983–84 and 1984–85.

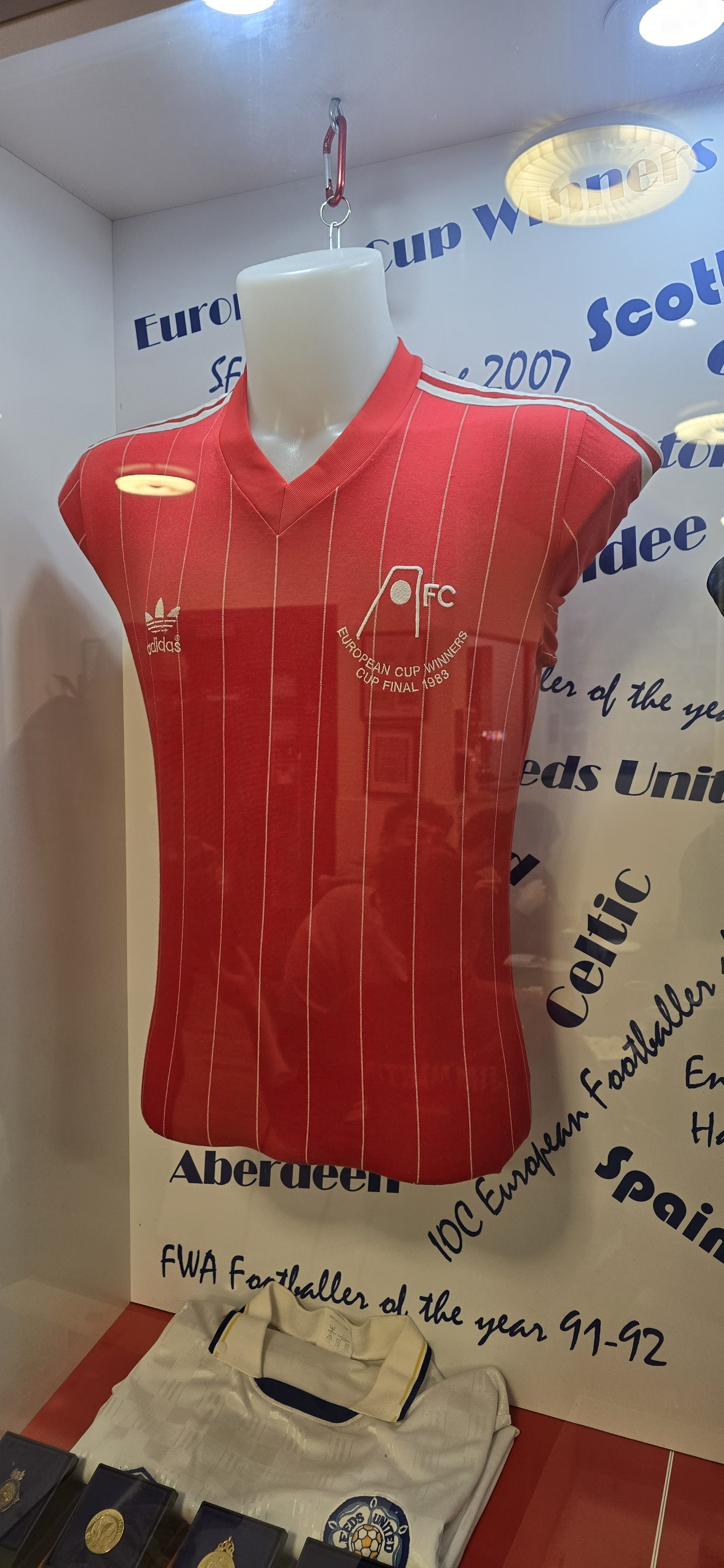
Gordon Strachan's 1983 European Cup Winners Cup final shirt (on display at Spartans FC clubhouse in Edinburgh).

During the European Cup Winners' Cup in 1983, Aberdeen beat FC Sion, Dinamo Tirana and Lech Poznań to face the German Cup winners Bayern Munich. This game was won 3–2 at Pittodrie after a goalless draw in Germany, John Hewitt with the winning goal. They then faced now-defunct Belgian club Waterschei in the semi-final. Aberdeen beat them 5–1 at home, and lost for the first time in the tournament, 1–0 away, resulting in an aggregate victory which sent Aberdeen to the final. On 11 May 1983, Aberdeen beat Real Madrid 2–1 after extra time to win the cup and become only the third Scottish side to win a European trophy. The club released a song, "European Song", to coincide with the appearance in the final. This was followed up with the capture of the European Super Cup in December, when Hamburger SV were beaten over two legs.

Aberdeen reached the semi-finals of the 1983–84 European Cup Winners' Cup, before losing to Porto 2–0 on aggregate. In the first round of the 1984–85 European Cup Aberdeen lost to East Berlin side BFC Dynamo in a penalty shoot-out, following a 3–3 draw on aggregate. Today, both clubs enjoy friendly relations.

=== Post-Ferguson (1987–1999) ===
After Ferguson moved to England to manage Manchester United in November 1986, Aberdeen struggled to compete with Celtic and a resurgent Rangers.

Aberdeen signed new co-managers in 1989, pairing Alex Smith and Jocky Scott. A number of foreign players were signed, including Dutch internationals Theo Snelders and Hans Gillhaus. In the 1989–90 season, the club won both the Scottish Cup and the Scottish League Cup. In 1991, they lost the last game of the season, and the league title, to Rangers. Former player Willie Miller took over in 1992 and presided over two seasons where Aberdeen came close to winning the title. However, the club ended the 1994–95 season second-bottom, and had to rely on a play-off victory over Dunfermline Athletic to retain their Premier Division status. Miller was sacked in February 1995, and replaced by Roy Aitken. Despite a Scottish League Cup success in 1995, the club continued to struggle. Alex Miller and Paul Hegarty had spells in charge in the late 1990s, but with the financial burden of a new stand putting the club into debt for the first time in its history, the directors turned to Stewart Milne, a local businessman whose firm had built the stand, hiring him as the club's chairman.

=== Skovdahl to Brown (1999–2013) ===
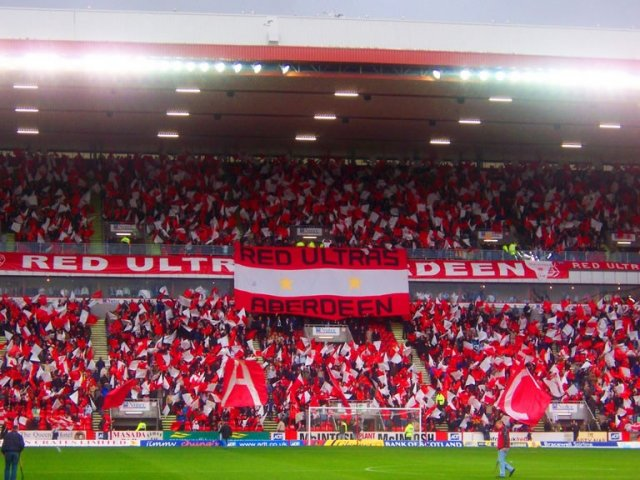
A display by Aberdeen fans in the Richard Donald Stand

Aberdeen's first foreign manager, Ebbe Skovdahl, was appointed in 1999 and his time in charge coincided with some of the heaviest defeats in the club's history. The low point of the club's history came in the 1999–2000 season, where they finished bottom of the table. As the Scottish Premier League (SPL) was being expanded to twelve teams, Aberdeen were due to take part in a three team play-off with the teams that finished second and third in the First Division. The play-off never happened though, as one of those clubs (Falkirk) did not meet SPL stadium requirements, and Aberdeen retained their top flight status. This was followed by an early-season defeat to Irish club Bohemians on the away goals rule in the next season's UEFA Cup.

Steve Paterson was appointed to replace Skovdahl following his resignation in 2002, but lasted only two seasons. Paterson's tenure with Aberdeen was marred by his addiction to alcohol. In March 2003 he failed to attend a home game against Dundee due to being too hungover after a night of drinking prior to the match.

Jimmy Calderwood took over in 2004 and Aberdeen posted more consistent results than in previous seasons. In the 2006–07 season, the club finished in third place in the league and entered the final qualifying round for the 2007–08 UEFA Cup. Aberdeen defeated Dnipro on the away goals rule to progress (the first time Aberdeen had won on away goals in European football for 40 years). They went on to beat Copenhagen 4–0, in a game which saw one of Pittodrie's biggest crowds since the 1980s. This set up a meeting with German giants Bayern Munich, which they lost 7–3 on aggregate after a 2–2 draw which saw Aberdeen lead twice in the first leg. Calderwood was sacked by Aberdeen on 24 May 2009, hours after he took the club to a fourth-place finish and back into Europe. Poor domestic cup performances were thought to be the reason for Calderwood's dismissal.

Mark McGhee of Motherwell was appointed as Calderwood's replacement in June 2009. McGhee controversially dismissed Aberdeen legend and goalkeeping coach Jim Leighton in August 2009 and replaced him with Colin Meldrum. Aberdeen suffered a 9–0 defeat to Celtic on 6 November 2010, their heaviest ever defeat. McGhee and his assistants were eventually sacked in December of that year.

Aberdeen approached Craig Brown, who was working without a contract at Motherwell, to replace McGhee. Brown initially rebuffed an offer, but after further discussions with the club Brown resigned as manager at Motherwell to be announced as the next manager at Aberdeen two days later. The first act of the new management team of Brown and Archie Knox was to re-instate Leighton. Aberdeen failed to produce better results under Craig Brown's tenure, and in March 2013 he announced his retirement to take up a non-executive director role on the club's board.

=== Recent years (2013–present) ===
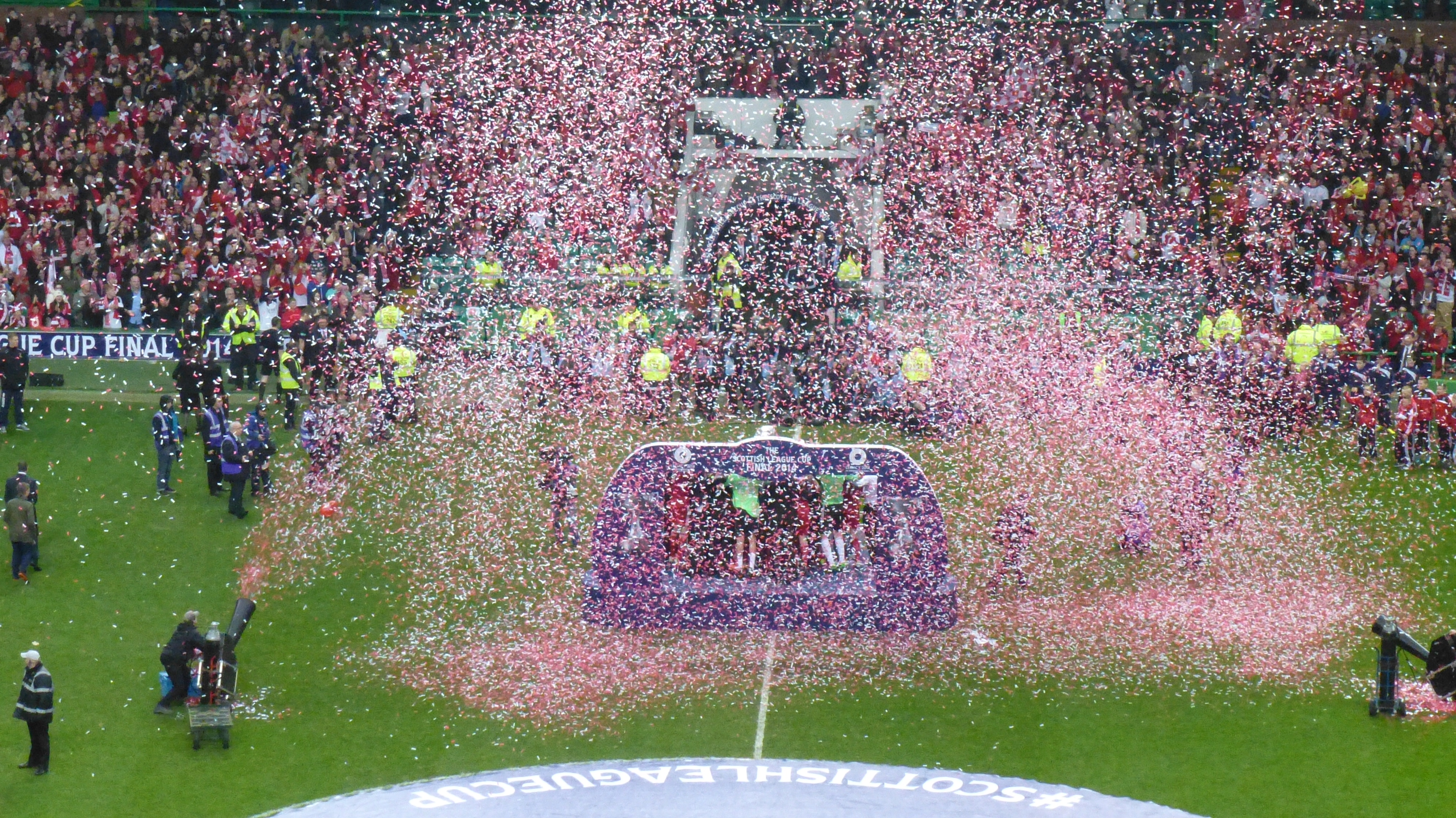
Aberdeen collecting their first trophy in 19 years in 2014

Derek McInnes was announced as the successor to Craig Brown in March 2013. In McInnes' first season as manager, Aberdeen won the 2013–14 Scottish League Cup after defeating Inverness 4–2 on penalties, their first trophy in 19 years. Aberdeen finished third in the Scottish Premiership, and began the next season by coming through the early rounds of the Europa League, beating Dutch club FC Groningen before eventually being eliminated by Spanish side Real Sociedad. The club ended the season in second place—their best league position since 1993–94—in 2015, 2016, and 2017. In recent seasons' Europa League competitions, they were defeated in the third qualifying round four times: In 2015–16 by FC Kairat, in 2016–17 by NK Maribor, in 2017–18 by Apollon Limassol, and in 2019–20 by HNK Rijeka.

Aberdeen were league runners-up once more in 2016–17 and reached both cup finals, but were beaten 3–0 by Celtic in the League Cup and 2–1 by the same opponents in the Scottish Cup, echoing the outcome in 1992–93 when Aberdeen had finished second to Rangers in all competitions. They were again second the following season, earning a first league win against Celtic away from home for fourteen years in the final game of the season. This qualified them for the 2018–19 UEFA Europa League, where they were defeated after extra time by Premier League side Burnley in the second qualifying round.

In November 2019, Major League Soccer side Atlanta United acquired a less than 10 percent stake in Aberdeen for £2 million (US$2.57 million) as part of a strategic alliance between the two clubs. As part of this deal, vice-chairman Dave Cormack became chairman of the club, replacing Stewart Milne. Atlanta United president Darren Eales also took a seat on Aberdeen's board of directors. McInnes left the post of manager in March 2021 after almost eight years in charge.

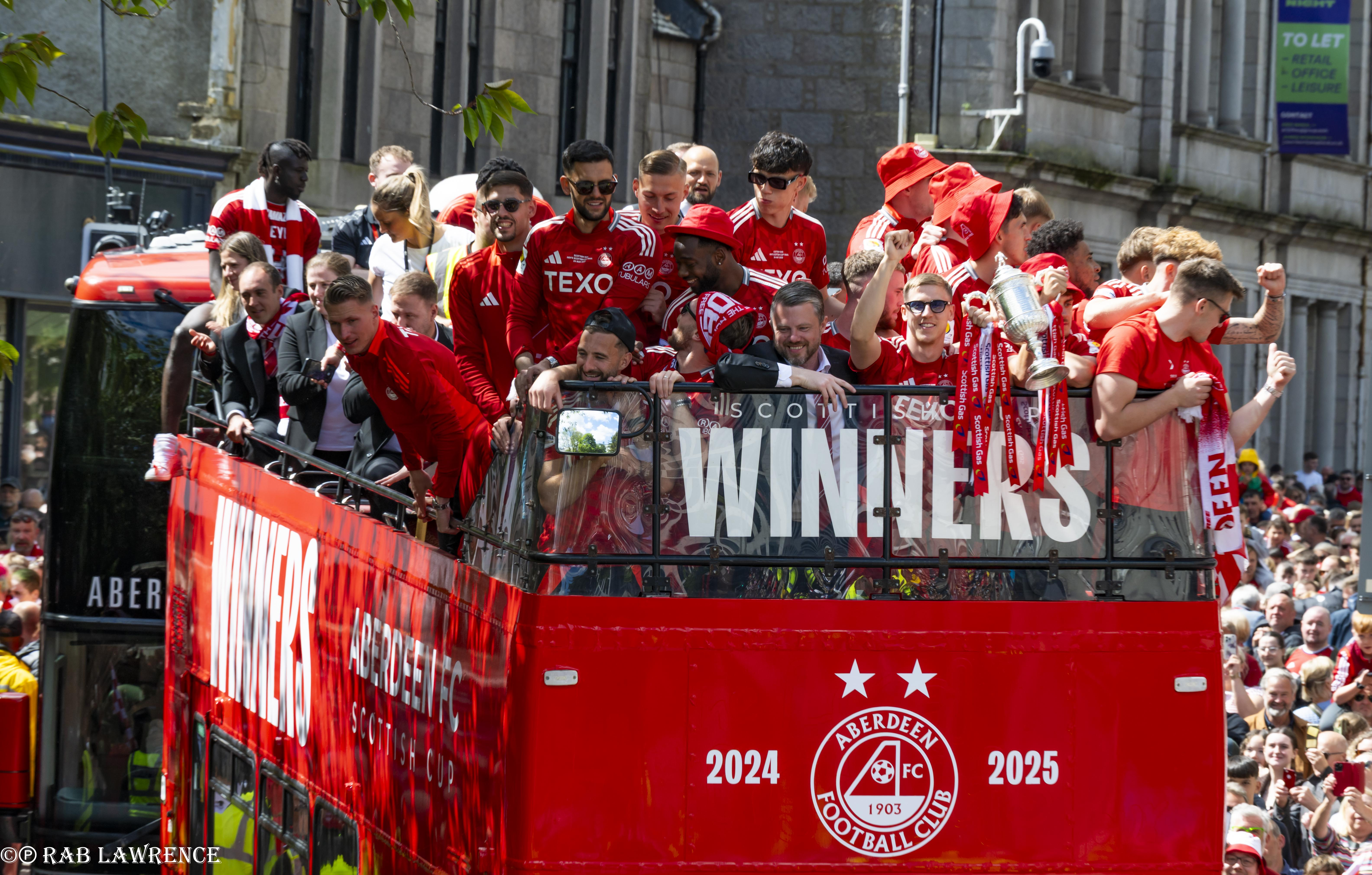
The Aberdeen squad which won the 2024–25 Scottish Cup during a victory parade in the city on the day after the final

Over the subsequent three years, Aberdeen went through four managers. Atlanta United 2 manager and former Aberdeen player Stephen Glass replaced McInnes but was dismissed in February 2022; subsequent hire Jim Goodwin was sacked following a surprise defeat to West of Scotland Football League side Darvel in the Scottish Cup and a 6–0 defeat by Hibernian in the same week; and Barry Robson, who become caretaker manager in January 2023 and permanent manager that May, left in January 2024. Neil Warnock briefly served as interim manager. In April 2024, the club announced that Jimmy Thelin would take the role beginning in June 2024. On 24 May 2025, Aberdeen won their first Scottish Cup in 35 years after a 1–1 draw with Celtic at Hampden Park, winning the penalty shoot-out 4–3 after extra time. Goalkeeper Dimitar Mitov saved two penalties in the shoot-out, and the result denied Celtic a domestic treble.

== Colours and crest ==
The "Wasps" black and gold strip, worn until 1939

For the first season of the club's existence, the team played in a predominantly white strip. This is variously reported as all-white, or as white shirts with blue shorts and socks. This colour scheme was the direct descendant of the colours worn by the precursor Aberdeen club, but lasted only one season before being replaced.

For the 1904–05 season, Aberdeen adopted a black and gold striped shirt, which led to the team being nicknamed "the Wasps". This strip, with only minor variations, was worn until just before the start of the Second World War. The blue shorts lasted until 1911, and then were replaced with white ones. Socks were black with gold trim, either as stripes or as a solid bar at the turndown.

A representative post-war Aberdeen strip. These colours were worn for all the trophy-winning seasons of the 1950s.

In March 1939, Aberdeen changed the black and gold colours to red and white, reflecting the silver and red colours of the official City of Aberdeen arms. The first red strips were worn with white shorts, with either red or white socks from 1939 until the 1965–66 season. In 1966, Aberdeen adopted red shorts, making the official kit all-red, similar to that of Liverpool, who made a similar change at around the same time. This arrangement has continued to the present day, with several variations in design, in common with most senior clubs as the replica shirt market has expanded. In the late 1970s an Admiral strip featured five vertical white stripes on the left side of the shirt and shorts, and the early 1980s shirts—as worn at the 1983 European Cup Winners Cup final—featured white vertical pinstripes. Later design changes included significant amounts of blue, and a one-season reversion to white shorts, although the all-red scheme returned in 1997.

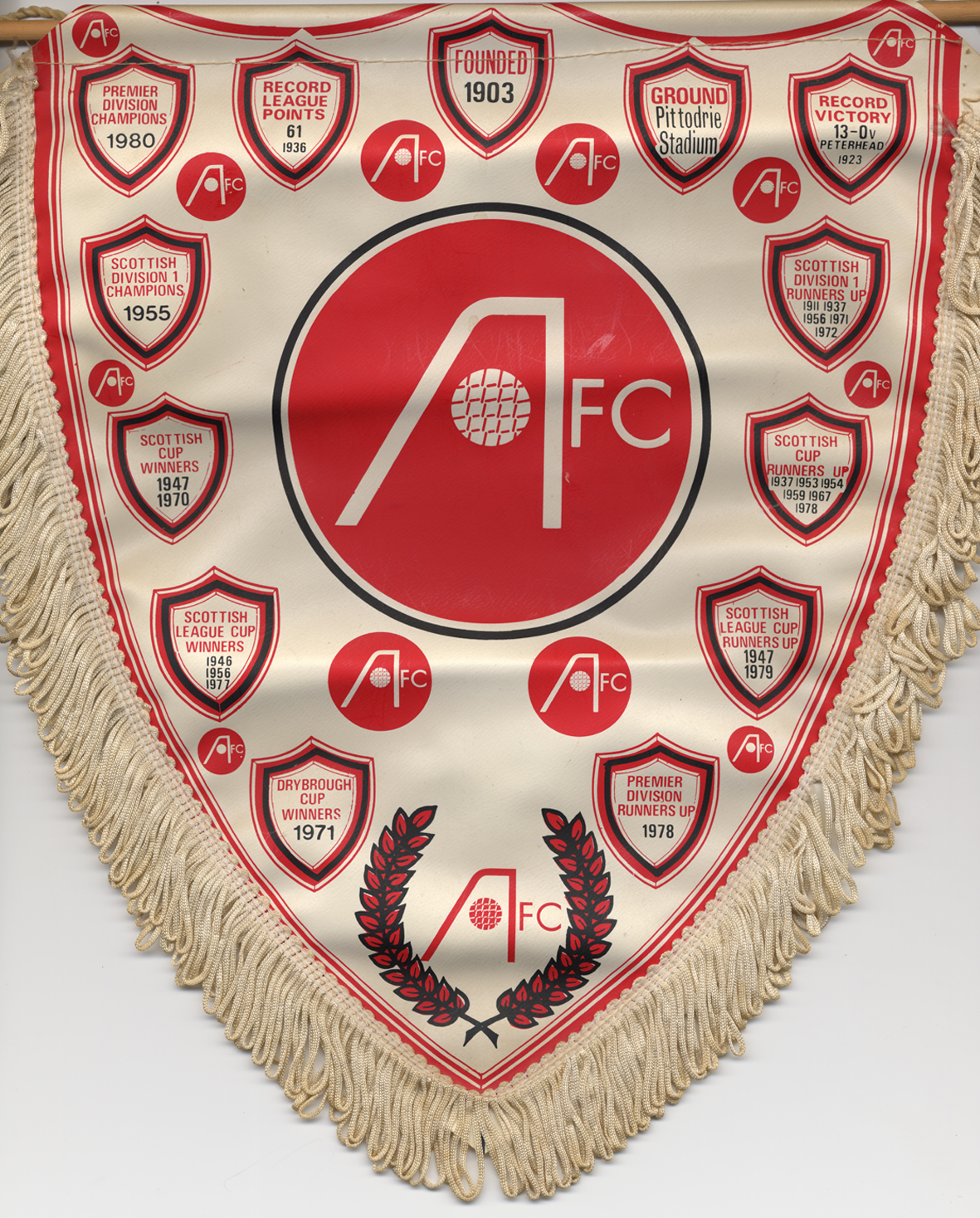
A commemorative pennant from 1980

Shirt sponsorship began in 1987, and the initial shirt sponsor was JVC. Since then, with the club making fewer appearances on the international stage, shirt sponsors have tended to be local to Aberdeen—they have included one of the local commercial radio stations, Northsound, as well as several Aberdeen-based oil service companies. As of 2026, the current shirt sponsor is TEXO.

Away colours have tended to be either white—often with black shorts—or a combination of yellow and black, referring back to the black and gold strips of the pre-war era, although for a time in the 1970s, Aberdeen sported an all-blue change strip with white socks. For the 2007–08 season, the change strip was all-white, with a third kit of yellow and black halves available if needed for European games, or in the event of a clash involving both red and white.

The club did not have an official crest before 1972, but several variations on the letters AFC had from time to time featured on the shirt, usually in some kind of cursive font. In November 1972, the club unveiled an official crest or logo, designed by Aberdonian graphic designer Donald Addison. The design represented a capital letter A as the side view of a football goal, with a ball forming the crossbar of the letter. This ball was crosshatched in such a way as to depict it as being inside the net, signifying the scoring of a goal. The logo was completed by the letters FC in smaller type at a level with the ball element. This badge was used on the shirts from around 1978, with no significant alterations until the mid-1980s when the words "Aberdeen Football Club" were added in a circular border, and the date of the club's founding, 1903, was added under the goal element. The current version of the crest, which retains these elements in a unified design, was introduced at the start of the 1997–98 season. Two stars signifying the winning of the two European trophies in 1983 were introduced over the badge in the 2005–06 season.

=== Kit suppliers and shirt sponsors ===
Period	Kit manufacturer	Shirt sponsor (front)	Shirt sponsor (sleeve)
1975–1976	Bukta	None	None
1976–1979	Admiral	None	None
1979–1987	Adidas	None	None
1987–1990	Umbro	JVC	None
1990–1993	Umbro	Abtrust	None
1993–1994	Umbro	A-Fab	None
1994–1996	Umbro	Northsound Radio	None
1996–1997	Umbro	Living Design	None
1997–1998	Puma	Living Design	None
1998–2001	Puma	Atlantic Telecom	None
2001–2004	Le Coq Sportif	A-Fab	None
2004–2006	Nike	ADT	None
2006–2008	Nike	Apex Tubulars	None
2008–2011	Nike	Team Recruitment	None
2011–2014	Adidas	Team Recruitment	None
2014–2022	Adidas	Saltire Energy	None
2022–2024	Adidas	TEXO	Tendeka
2024–2026	Adidas	TEXO	Ram Tubulars
2026–	Macron	TEXO	Ram Tubulars

== Stadium ==
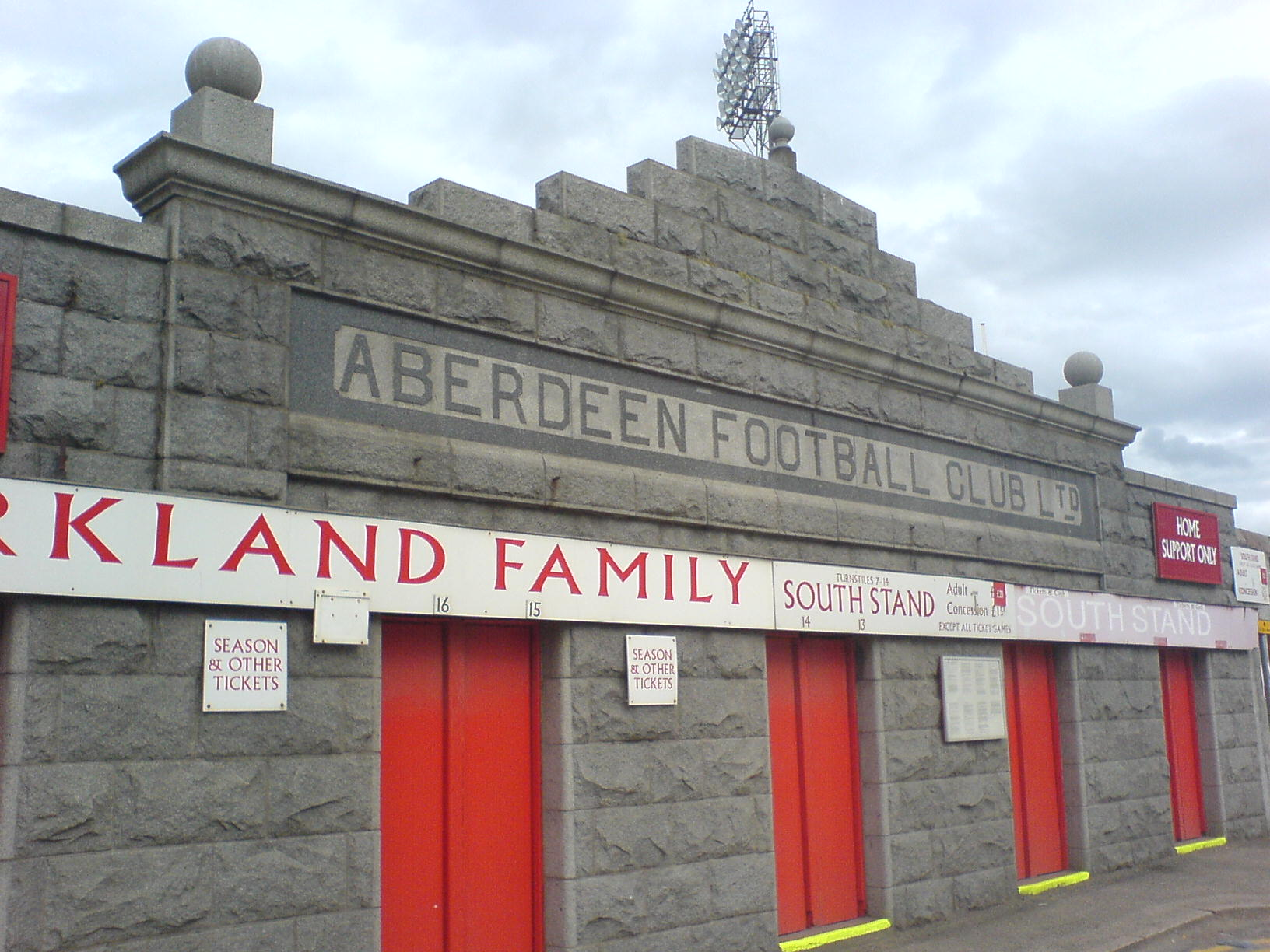
Pittodrie Stadium's granite facade viewed from outside the Merkland Road stand

Aberdeen have played throughout their existence at Pittodrie Stadium, the name of which comes from a Celtic term for "place of manure". The ground was first used by the original Aberdeen F.C. in 1899, in a 7–1 win over Dumbarton; when they merged with two other teams in 1903, the new club took over the old Aberdeen ground. On 15 August 1903, 8,000 spectators turned up to watch the new Aberdeen draw 1–1 against Stenhousemuir, the first game played at Pittodrie by its amalgamated tenants. The club initially rented the ground, but subsequently bought it in 1920. The stadium currently seats 19,274. The record attendance is 45,061, during a Scottish Cup match between Aberdeen and Hearts on 13 March 1954.

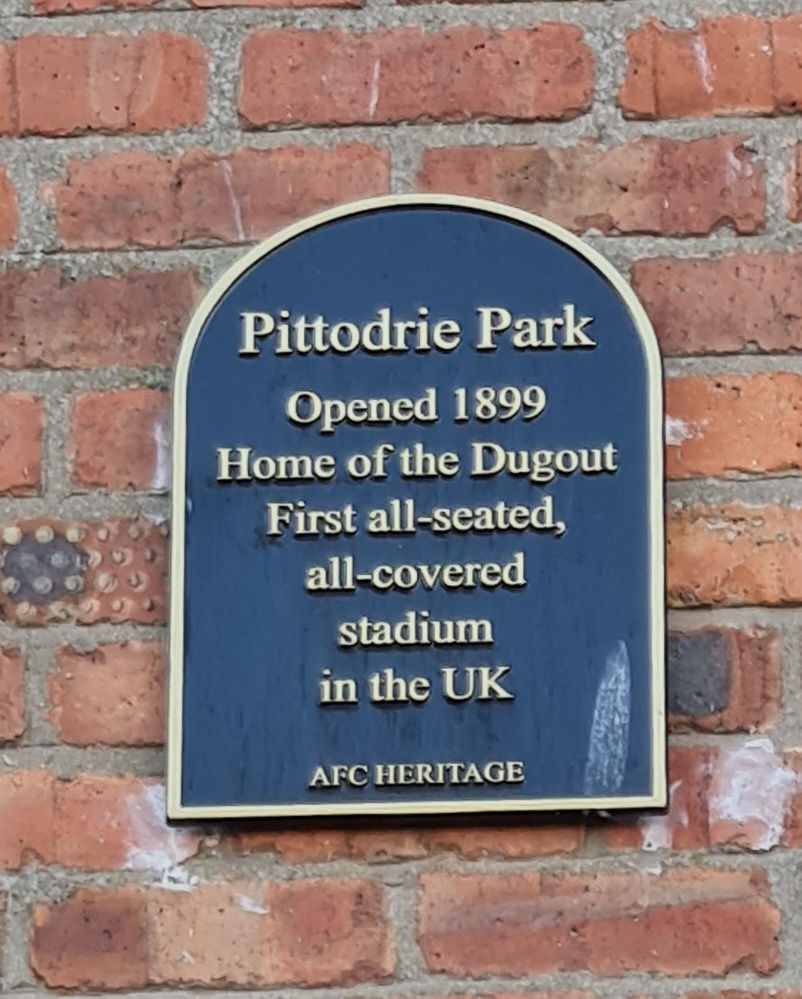
Commemorative plaque on the wall of Pittodrie Stadium on Pittodrie Street.

The stadium consists of four stands: the Main Stand, which also houses the club offices and players facilities; the Merkland Road Stand, also referred to as the "Red Shed"; the South Stand, which is opposite the main stand and holds the largest number of spectators; and the Richard Donald stand to the east, which was completed in 1993, contains hospitality suites, and is named after former chairman Dick Donald. A quarter of the South Stand is used to accommodate travelling supporters. In 1978, Pittodrie became the first all covered, all-seater stadium in Britain.

=== Training facilities ===
Aberdeen train at Cormack Park, which was opened on 31 October 2019 by former manager Alex Ferguson, who described the development as "up there with the best" that he had seen. As well as being a training centre for the first team, the complex is also home to the Bobby Clark Football Academy and the AFC Community Trust, as well as acting as a community sports hub. The training facilities are named after chairman Dave Cormack, due to the significant financial investment he made to realise the completion of the project.

The complex is made up of a training pavilion, groundsman's accommodation, three full-sized training pitches, two floodlit 3G pitches and two grass pitches. There is also flexible outdoor and indoor space that can be used for sporting or recreational purposes. All the pitches are named after club legends, chosen by the fans via an online poll.

Prior to the opening of Cormack Park, the first team trained in a variety of locations around the city, including the local Gordon Barracks, Seaton Park, Aberdeen Sports Village and Countesswells, the playing fields of Robert Gordon's College.

=== New Aberdeen Stadium ===
Since 2009, Aberdeen have been examining a move to a new stadium. Plans for a new stadium began when the club indicated that further development of Pittodrie Stadium was not possible due to the age of the ground and the restrictions from surrounding land. Aberdeen City Council approved an initial project in May 2009, to be situated near Loirston Loch in the south of the city, subject to planning permission. In August 2010, a planning application for the new stadium was submitted to the council, which was approved the following February.

The move was delayed by a year in May 2012 due to problems with land ownership, and suffered a serious setback the following August, when the council rejected a joint application by Aberdeen and Cove Rangers to build a community sports centre at nearby Calder Park. Aberdeen announced in November 2014 new plans to instead build training facilities at Balgownie, on land owned by the University of Aberdeen, but the project was ultimately scrapped in the following July.

Plans to develop a new stadium and training facilities near Westhill, close to the newly developed Aberdeen Western Peripheral Route, were announced in May 2016. The new stadium is expected to have a similar capacity to Pittodrie Stadium. Although the project overcame legal challenges from local residents, progress stalled due to the economic impact of the COVID-19 pandemic in Scotland. Alternative designs at the city's beachfront close to Pittodrie were released in August 2021.

== Supporters and nicknames ==
=== Supporters ===
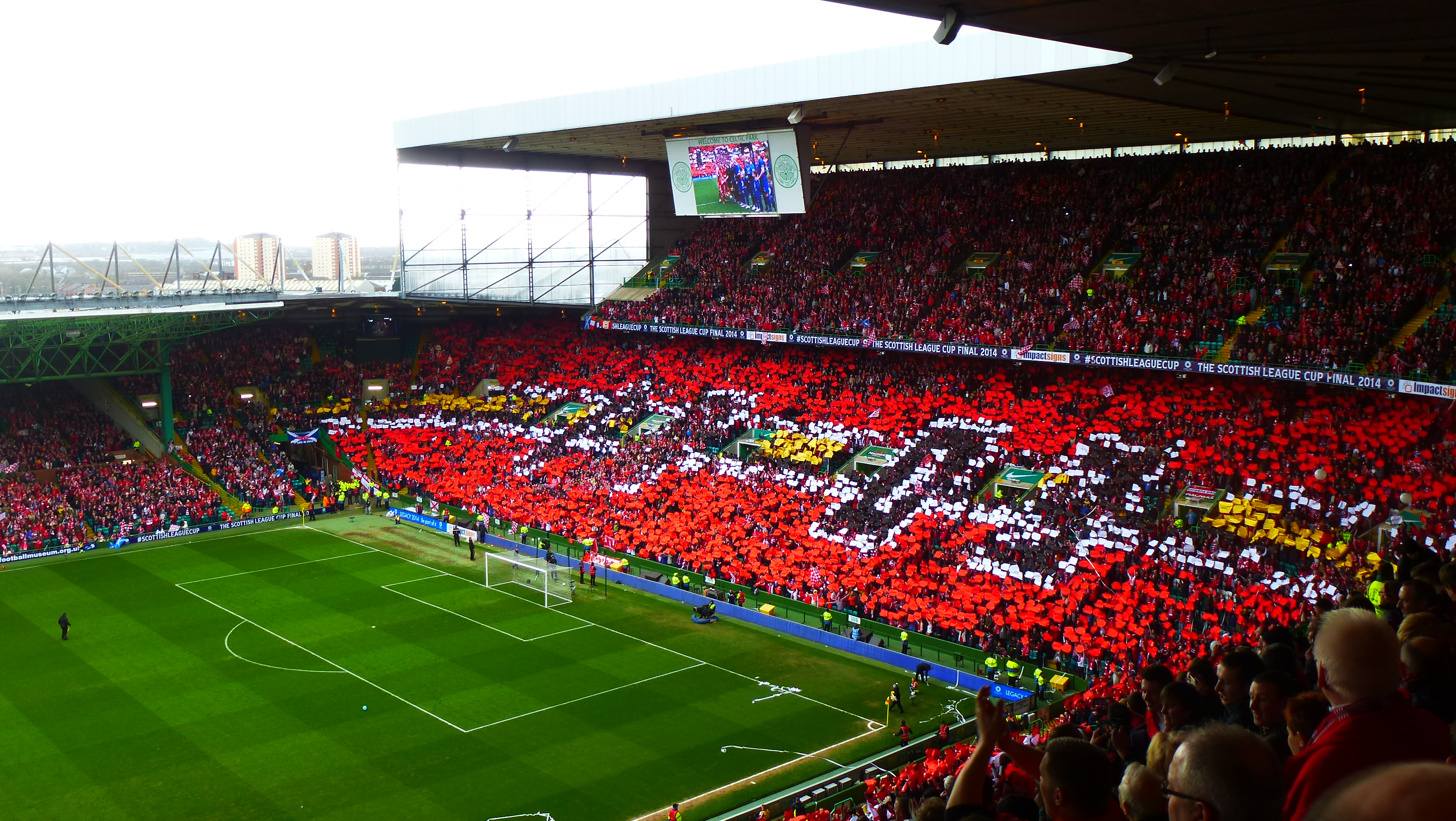
Fans display "1903", the year of the club's establishment, before the 2014 Scottish League Cup final

Aberdeen's supporters, known as the Red Army, are listed in the team squad list as wearing the number 12 shirt.

Aberdeen are the only top-flight team in the third largest city in Scotland, a city which is relatively remote, geographically, from other large population centres, and as a result have a large catchment area of potential supporters. The average attendance in the 2023–24 Scottish Premiership was 16,055.

In the 1980s, a minority of the club's supporters had a reputation as one of Britain's most prominent casuals groups, the Aberdeen Soccer Casuals. The rise of the Aberdeen Casuals coincided with the most successful period in the club's history, and has been chronicled in more than one published account. Whilst numbers have steadily declined with the introduction of Football Banning Orders preventing hooligans from travelling to games, the Aberdeen Casuals still appear at big fixtures often away from home and in the UEFA Europa League. There were clashes at both fixtures against FC Groningen in 2014, as well as 13 arrests after violent clashes with Dundee United fans at a game in December 2015.

=== Rivalries ===
Aberdeen have rarely played in the same division as their geographically closest neighbours (Cove Rangers, Peterhead, Brechin City, Montrose, Arbroath, Elgin City, and Forfar Athletic), so rivalries have tended to come from further afield. Cove Rangers from the same city entered the professional leagues for the first time in 2019, although the Aberdeen derby is yet to occur in a league meeting.

In the early 1980s, owing to the success both domestically and in Europe of Aberdeen and Dundee United, the pair were known as the New Firm. However, Dundee United have their city neighbours Dundee as close rivals, and the antagonism was not always reciprocated to the same degree.

The same situation applies to Aberdeen's rivalry with Rangers, in that Rangers have their own much older and well-known Old Firm rivalry with Celtic. Aberdeen's rivalry with Rangers arose after a number of incidents in matches between the two clubs in the 1980s, namely Willie Johnston's stamp on John McMaster's neck in the Scottish League Cup and Neil Simpson's tackle on Ian Durrant in 1988, as well as Aberdeen's dominance in Scottish football throughout the decade. Manager Alex Ferguson's personal history with Rangers also played a role: a boyhood fan and once the club's record signing, Ferguson had long believed that Rangers had frozen him out of the club after they discovered his wife was a Roman Catholic. In the 2021 documentary Sir Alex Ferguson: Never Give In, he admitted that his remarks after Aberdeen won the 1983 Scottish Cup final (where, despite Aberdeen beating Rangers 1–0, he regarded it as a "disgraceful performance") were born from a desire to win by a larger margin. There are still often violent clashes between both sets of supporters within and outwith the stadium to this day.

Aberdeen developed a minor rivalry with Inverness Caledonian Thistle since Inverness were first promoted to the SPL in 2004. It is known as the North derby, since Aberdeen and Inverness are the two largest settlements in the north of Scotland.

Aberdeen's re-emerged as one of the top teams in Scotland during the 2010s, which increased the rivalry with Celtic both competitively and between supporters. There have been minor incidents at games.

=== Nicknames ===
Aberdeen are known as "The Dons", a name that has been in use since at least 1913. The origin of this nickname is unclear. One theory is that it derives from the word "don" meaning "teacher", given Aberdeen's history as a university town. It may also be a reference to the nearby River Don, or a contraction of "Aberdonians". Before the popular adoption of "The Dons", the team were variously known as "The Wasps" or "The Black and Golds", both names a reference to the yellow and black striped shirts of the time. As with many teams that play in red, Aberdeen may also be called "The Reds", and are referred to by some supporters as "The Dandy Dons" or "The Dandies".

Rival clubs occasionally refer to Aberdeen as "The Sheep" and their supporters as "The Sheep Shaggers". The term was eventually accepted by the club's supporters, and fans began chanting "the sheep are on fire" at games. The song was originally sung by away fans poking fun at an Aberdeen fan set on fire on a train while wearing a homemade sheep costume. This in turn led to specialised merchandise being sold by the club and local businesses.

=== Songs ===
Chants and songs include "The Northern Lights of Old Aberdeen" and "Stand Free", the latter of which is set to the tune of "Lord of the Dance".

=== Ultras ===
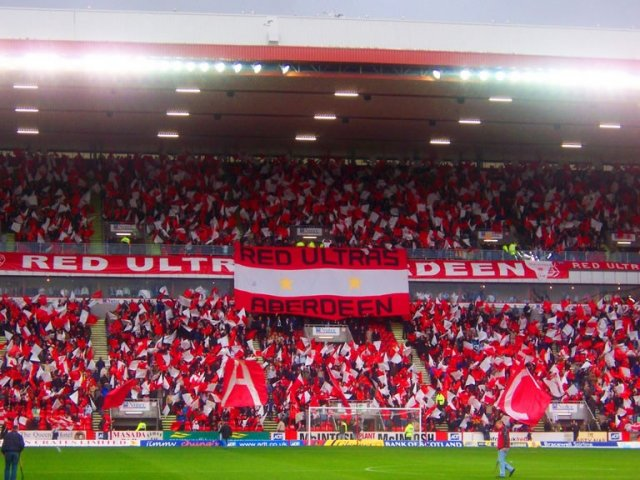
"Red Ultras" Display

Aberdeen has had a few ultras groups over its lifetime. In 1999, a group of supporters formed a fan group called the red ultras; this group came together in making displays over its lifetime such as their "one love" display and their "red ultras" display. The red ultras disbanded at the beginning of 2010. Following the introduction of the "Red Shed", a new group going by the name of "Ultras Aberdeen" formed in 2022 and have made displays such as the "Heroes" display in tribute to 1983 European Cup Winners' Cup final. There was also a display at Hampden Park for the 2023 Viaplay League Cup final against Rangers. The group has also been responsible for surfing flag displays as well the use of pyrotechnics such as smoke bombs and flares.

== Players ==
=== Current squad ===
As of 19 September 2026

Note: Flags indicate national team as defined under FIFA eligibility rules; some limited exceptions apply. Players may hold more than one non-FIFA nationality.

No.	Pos.	Nation	Player
2	DF	SCO	Nicky Devlin
3	DF	SCO	Mitchel Frame
4	DF	LAT	Kristers Tobers
5	DF	NED	Mats Knoester
7	MF	ENG	Tony Yogane
8	MF	NIR	Brad Lyons (vice-captain)
9	FW	MAR	Ayoub Mouloua
10	MF	AUT	Alexander Briedl
11	MF	SCO	Lewis Smith
14	MF	FRA	Hicham Mahou
15	FW	SCO	Kevin Nisbet (captain)
17	MF	SCO	Stuart Armstrong
18	MF	CRO	Ante Palaversa
20	FW	ENG	Toyosi Olusanya

No.	Pos.	Nation	Player
21	DF	IRL	Gavin Molloy
22	DF	SCO	Jack Milne
23	DF	SCO	Lewis Mayo
24	DF	ENG	Nesta Guinness-Walker
25	MF	IRL	Connor Ronan
26	DF	ENG	Dan Happe
27	GK	GER	Marius Müller
28	DF	SCO	Chris Cadden
30	GK	GER	Daniel Klein
31	FW	BEL	Mitchy Ntelo
32	MF	NGR	Afeez Aremu
40	MF	SCO	Findlay Marshall
77	DF	GER	Emmanuel Gyamfi

=== On loan ===
Note: Flags indicate national team as defined under FIFA eligibility rules; some limited exceptions apply. Players may hold more than one non-FIFA nationality.

No.	Pos.	Nation	Player
13	GK	AUS	Nicholas Suman (on loan at Ross County)
16	DF	SCO	Dylan Lobban (on loan at Dunfermline Athletic)
19	FW	AUS	Kusini Yengi (on loan at Sanfrecce Hiroshima)
35	MF	SCO	Alfie Stewart (on loan at Inverness CT)
36	FW	SCO	Alfie Bavidge (on loan at Inverness CT)
41	GK	LAT	Rodrigo Vitols (on loan at Fraserburgh)
42	DF	SCO	Jamie Mercer (co-operation loan with Cove Rangers)
43	DF	SCO	Lewis Carrol (on loan at Huntly)
44	MF	SCO	Aaron Cummings (on loan at Elgin City)
47	MF	SCO	Sam McLean (on loan at Huntly)
54	FW	SCO	Jack Searle (co-operation loan with Peterhead)
56	DF	SCO	Joel Okhuoya (on loan at Formartine United)

No.	Pos.	Nation	Player
—	GK	SCO	Conlan Waldron (on loan at Banchory St Ternan)
—	DF	SCO	Jay Henderson (on loan at Turriff United)
—	DF	SCO	James Jarvie (on loan at Deveronvale)
—	DF	SCO	Max Pocklington (on loan at Keith)
—	DF	SCO	Dylan Ross (co-operation loan with Cove Rangers)
—	MF	SWE	Kenan Bilalović (on loan at MŠK Žilina)
—	MF	SCO	Heath Duncan (on loan at Keith)
—	MF	SCO	JJ Hulse (on loan at Buckie Thistle)
—	FW	SCO	Bradley Chikomo (on loan at Colony Park)
—	FW	SCO	Joseph Teasdale (co-operation loan with Cove Rangers)
—	FW	SCO	Zak To (co-operation loan with Peterhead)

=== Notable players ===
Hall of Fame

Aberdeen inaugurated a Hall of Fame as part of the club's centenary celebrations in 2003. Six players were inducted following the initial dinner in March 2004, and a further six were included in November 2004. Ex-manager Alex Ferguson was inducted at a re-launch event in November 2015.

In 2017, Neale Cooper, Archie Knox, John McMaster and Graham Leggat were inducted into the Hall of Fame. In 2018, Eoin Jess, Peter Weir, Bobby Clark and Donald Colman were inducted. Matt Armstrong, Brian Irvine, Hans Gillhaus, and Charlie Nicholas were inducted in January 2025.

- Chris Anderson
- Matt Armstrong
- Jim Bett
- Henning Boel
- Martin Buchan
- Bobby Clark
- Donald Colman
- Neale Cooper
- Dick Donald
- Alex Ferguson
- Hans Gillhaus
- Arthur Graham
- Joe Harper
- Jim Hermiston
- John Hewitt
- Brian Irvine
- Drew Jarvie
- Eoin Jess
- Stuart Kennedy
- Archie Knox
- Graham Leggat
- Jim Leighton
- Ally MacLeod
- Fred Martin
- Alex McLeish
- John McMaster
- Willie Miller
- Charlie Nicholas
- Teddy Scott
- Ally Shewan
- Neil Simpson
- Eddie Turnbull
- Peter Weir
- Alec Young

Greatest ever team

In November 2015, supporters cast votes to determine the greatest ever Aberdeen team.

- (Scotland) Jim Leighton (1977–88, 1997–2000)
- (Scotland) Stuart Kennedy (1976–83)
- (Scotland) Willie Miller (1972–90)
- (Scotland) Alex McLeish (1978–94)
- (Scotland) Russell Anderson (1996–2007, 2012–15)
- (Scotland) Gordon Strachan (1977–84)
- (Scotland) Eoin Jess (1987–96, 1997–2001)
- (Scotland) Jim Bett (1985–94)
- (Scotland) Neil Simpson (1980–90)
- (Scotland) Joe Harper (1969–72, 1976–81)
- (Scotland) Duncan Shearer (1992–97)

== Club officials ==
=== Technical staff ===
As of 15 November 2026

- Head coach: Mario Frick
- Assistant head coach: Roman Matter
- First team coach: Stuart Duff
- Goalkeeping coach: Craig Hinchliffe
- Head of recruitment: Darren Mowbray
- Head of player ID: Ross Clarkson
- Academy director: Stuart Glennie
- Head of academy coaching: Mark Slater
- Development coach: Paul Coutts
- Head of physiotherapy: Gerry Docherty
- Head of sports science and fitness: Graham Kirk

=== Management ===
As of 1 July 2026

- Chairman: Dave Cormack
- Board of directors:
  - Rachel Corsie (non-executive)
  - Tom Crotty (non-executive)
  - Dimitrios Efstathiou (non-executive)
  - Willie Garner (non-executive)
  - David Lawrie (non-executive)
  - Nic Heslop (commercial)
  - Kevin MacIver (finance)
- Chief executive: Adrian Bevington
- Secretary: Roy Johnston
- Director of football: Lutz Pfannenstiel
- Honorary president: Ian Donald

== Managers ==
List of full-time managers, as of 12 March 2026. Only competitive league matches are counted. Caretaker managers are not listed.

From	To	Name	P	W	D	L	Win%	Ref
1903	1924	(Scotland) Jimmy Philip	644	221	172	251	34.32	
1924	1937	(Scotland) Paddy Travers	474	214	106	154	45.15	
1937	1955	(Scotland) Dave Halliday	371	165	71	135	44.47	
1955	1959	(Scotland) Davie Shaw	148	66	20	62	44.59	
1959	1965	(Scotland) Tommy Pearson	180	66	42	72	36.67	
1965	1971	(Scotland) Eddie Turnbull	216	101	43	72	46.76	
1971	1975	(Scotland) Jimmy Bonthrone	143	67	46	30	46.85	
1975	1977	(Scotland) Ally MacLeod	61	24	19	18	39.34	
1977	1978	(Scotland) Billy McNeill	36	22	9	5	61.11	
1978	1986	(Scotland) Alex Ferguson	288	167	71	50	57.99	
1986	1986	(Scotland) Alex Ferguson (Scotland) Archie Knox	15	7	5	3	46.67	
1986	1988	(Scotland) Ian Porterfield	71	35	27	9	49.30	
1988	1991	(Scotland) Jocky Scott (Scotland) Alex Smith	117	63	35	19	53.85	
1991	1992	(Scotland) Alex Smith	23	7	7	9	30.43	
1992	1995	(Scotland) Willie Miller	126	54	46	26	42.86	
1995	1997	(Scotland) Roy Aitken	100	35	28	37	35.00	
1997	1998	(Scotland) Alex Miller	38	10	11	17	26.32	
1999	2002	(Denmark) Ebbe Skovdahl	130	40	31	59	30.77	
2002	2004	(Scotland) Steve Paterson	57	18	10	29	31.58	
2004	2009	(Scotland) Jimmy Calderwood	190	79	49	62	41.58	
2009	2010	(Scotland) Mark McGhee	53	13	12	28	24.53	
2010	2013	(Scotland) Craig Brown	93	27	29	37	29.03	
2013	2021	(Scotland) Derek McInnes	295	157	60	78	53.22	
2021	2022	(Scotland) Stephen Glass	29	9	6	14	31.03	
2022	2023	(Republic of Ireland) Jim Goodwin	35	11	7	17	31.43	
2023	2024	(Scotland) Barry Robson	36	15	7	14	41.67	
2024	2026	(Sweden) Jimmy Thelin	80	33	16	31	41.25	
March 2026	November 2026	(Northern Ireland) Stephen Robinson	22	10	5	7	45.45	
November 2026	Present	(Liechtenstein) Mario Frick	0	0	0	0	—	

== Honours ==
Type	Competition	Titles	Seasons
Domestic	Scottish League	4	1954–55, 1979–80, 1983–84, 1984–85
Domestic	Scottish Cup	8	1946–47, 1969–70, 1981–82, 1982–83, 1983–84, 1985–86, 1989–90, 2024–25
Domestic	Scottish League Cup	6	1955–56, 1976–77, 1985–86, 1989–90, 1995–96, 2013–14
Continental	UEFA Cup Winners' Cup	1	1982–83
Continental	UEFA Super Cup	1	1983

=== Other awards ===
- France Football European Team of the Year: 1

1983

- The club was awarded the Freedom of the City of Aberdeen on 16 December 2022 following a unanimous vote by Aberdeen City Council.

== Records ==
=== Individual ===
All players are from Scotland unless otherwise stated. Competitive, professional matches only, up to the end of the 2025–26 season.

Top goalscorers

Rank	Player	Career	Apps	Goals	Average
1	Joe Harper	1969–1973, 1976–1981	300	199	0.66
2	Matt Armstrong	1931–1939, 1945–1946	219	156 (Note: source has 164 goals/232 games, but 8 goals/13 games were from unofficial wartime league fixtures in 1945/46.)	0.71
3	George Hamilton	1938–1939, 1945–1955	284	155 (Note: source has 159 goals/292 games, but 4 goals/8 games were from unofficial wartime league fixtures in 1945/46.)	0.55
4	Harry Yorston	1947–1957	278	141	0.51
5	Drew Jarvie	1972–1982	386	131	0.34
6	Benny Yorston	1927–1932	156	124	0.79
7	Willie Mills	1932–1938	210	114	0.54
8	Jack Hather (England)	1948–1960	351	105	0.30
9	Mark McGhee	1978–1984	249	100	0.4
10=	Billy Little	1957–1968	306	98	0.32
10=	Davie Robb	1966–1978	345	98	0.28

Most appearances

Rank	Player	Career	Apps	Goals
1	Willie Miller	1972–1990	796	32
2	Alex McLeish	1978–1994	689	30
3	Bobby Clark	1965–1980	591	0
4	Andrew Considine	2004–2022	571	41
5	Stewart McKimmie	1983–1997	562	9
6	Jim Leighton	1977–1988, 1997–2000	533	0
7	Russell Anderson	1996–2007, 2011–2015	407	21
8	Drew Jarvie	1972–1982	386	131
9	Brian Irvine	1985–1997	385	40
10	Eoin Jess	1989–1996, 1997–2001	380	94

(Note: source has Willie Cooper 394 games/3 goals, but 17 games/0 goals were from unofficial wartime league fixtures in 1945/46.)

== See also ==
- Aberdeen F.C. Women
