= 2026–27 Aberdeen F.C. season =

Aberdeen
2026–27 season
- Chairman: Dave Cormack
- Manager: Stephen Robinson (until 9 November); Mario Frick (from 15 November)
- Ground: Pittodrie Stadium; Aberdeen, Scotland (Capacity: 19,274)
- Scottish League Cup: Semi–finals
- Top goalscorer: League: Nisbet (6); All: Nisbet (15)
- Highest home attendance: 18,513 vs Heart of Midlothian
- Lowest home attendance: 7,078 vs Kelty Hearts
- Average home league attendance: 15,622
Away colours

The 2026–27 Aberdeen F.C. season is Aberdeen's 113th season in the top flight of Scottish football and the fourteenth in the Scottish Premiership. Aberdeen will also compete in the League Cup and the Scottish Cup.

== Summary ==
=== May ===
Ryan Duncan, Vicente Besuijen, Tom McIntyre and Elvis Bwomono all left the club and became free agents. Graeme Shinnie left for Inverness Caledonian Thistle. The draw for the group stage of the League Cup was made and were drawn to play Queens Park, Queen of the South, Kelty Hearts and Brora Rangers. Lewis Mayo and Brad Lyons signed on a free from Kilarnock and on the same day Alexander Briedl joined the club. Development Players Joseph Teasdale and Dylan Ross agreed new contracts.

=== June ===
Former chairman and current non-executive director, Stewart Milne, is to step down from the Board after 32 years. Macron became the new kit manufacturer. Dan Happe signed for free from Leyton Orient. The Dons announced pre-season in The Netherlands. Per Kristian Bråtveit left the club on a free. Toyosi Olusanya signed a two-year deal on a free from Houston Dynamo. Irish midfielder Connor Ronan signed on a free from Colorado Rapids. After rumours of both leaving, Alfie Stewart and Alfie Bavidge signed new deals. Former Dundee loanee Tony Yogane joined for an undisclosed fee from English Premiership side Brentford signing on until 2030. The fixtures were released with the Dons kicking off at home to Hearts. The away kit was released before the friendly against Cove Rangers. Alfie Bavidge returned to Inverness CT on loan for the season. Stephen Craigan joined the coaching staff as Robinson links up with him again as his Number 2. Moroccan striker Ayoub Mouloua joined from FUS Rabat for an undisclosed fee.

=== July ===
Pre-season continued out in the Netherlands with a behind closed doors friendly win against FC Bocholt 1900 followed by a loss to FC Twente. Full back Alexander Jensen left the club to join Swedish Allsvenskan side IF Elfsborg for an undisclosed fee. Alfie Stewart joined Inverness CT on a season-long loan following Bavidge and reuniting with the club they had both been with the previous season. It was widely reported that the Dons suffered a 6–3 loss to Ross County behind closed doors. English Left-back Nesta Guinness-Walker joined Aberdeen on a two-year contract on a free after leaving Northampton Town. Topi Keskinen left for Danish side Odense for just over a million pounds. Youngsters Jack Searle, Lewis Carrol, and Zak To were loaned to Peterhead, whilst Aaron Cummings and Bradley Chikomo linked up with Elgin City. However, Chikomo's loan was cut short and he joined Turriff United. Theo Simpson will return to Buckie Thistle along with JJ Hulse and defenders Jay Henderson and James Jarvie will head for Turriff United and Deveronvale respectively. Sam McLean joined Huntly with Max Pocklington and Heath Duncan joining Keith. Conlan Waldron joined Junior side Banchory St Ternan. The Dons completed pre-season with a win in Belfast against Linfield. Marko Lazetic left for an undisclosed fee to FC Noah who the Dons played in last seasons Conference League and the club were quick to replace him by signing Livingston winger Lewis Smith for a reported £300,000. Goalkeeper Marius Müller joined for a reported £500,000 from relegated Bundesliga side Wolfsburg. The club were granted an alcohol licence after the successful trials of the previous season. Former Scotland Women's International Rachel Corsie joined the board. Nicolas Milanovic returned to Sydney from where the club signed him from the previous summer. The Dons won all four of their League Cup matches to setup a home tie in the Second Round with fellow Premiership side Dundee. Andrew Fasanya officially became the youngest player ever to represent Aberdeen FC's first team at 15 years, 7 months, and 12 days old. Former Scotland cap Chris Cadden signed from Hibernian for an undisclosed fee.

=== August ===
Kevin Nisbet was named as club captain for the season with new signing Brad Lyons as vice captain. Nisbet scored a 95th minute winning penalty against Hearts in a comeback victory at a raucous Pittodrie. Fourth choice goalkeeper Rodrigo Vitols was loaned to Fraserburgh until January. Belgian forward Mitchy Ntelo joined The Dons from Swiss side Yverdon-Sport FC for an undisclosed fee. Dundee comfortably beat them at Dens Park. Dimitar Mitov joined 2. Bundesliga side St Pauli for a reported fee of £430,000. Kjartan Már Kjartansson signed for Eliteserien side SK Brann for a reported fee of close to a million pounds. The away fixture against Motherwell was postponed as they had progressed in European competition and had the right of postponement. Dylan Lobban signed a new contract and was then immediately loaned to Championship side Dunfermline Athletic. The Dons got their revenge against Dundee in the League Cup to setup a Quarter Final tie away to Kilmarnock. Peter Ambrose joined Swiss side Neuchâtel Xamax for an undisclosed fee. Jamie Mercer joined Cove Rangers on loan. Brad Lyons was expected to miss 3-4 weeks of action having had minor surgery to tidy up a small knee issue. Joel Okhuoya joined Formartine United on loan. They lost to at home to Rangers in the League. Kusini Yengi joined J1 League side Sanfrecce Hiroshima on a season loan.

=== September ===
The Dons were away to Celtic and lost three first half goals. Theo Simpson's loan with Buckie Thistle was terminated and moved to Forfar Athletic instead. German goalkeeper Daniel Klein joined on a two-year deal on a free from Augsburg. Kenan Bilalović joined Slovak Super Liga side MŠK Žilina on a season-long loan. Both Lewis Carrol and Sam McLean joined Huntly on loan. In the League, the Dons drew a blank against Kilmarnock. French winger Hicham Mahou joined on a one-year contract with the option for a further year. The Dons got their revenge against Kilmarnock at Rugby Park in the League Cup despite Dan Happe's red card. Muller saved three penalties to set up a Semi-Final at Hampden against Rangers on Halloween. They followed up with an away victory by four goals at Motherwell's Fir Park, their first away League win since the previous December and their biggest win at the ground in an astonishing 42 years!! Before the match, chief executive Alan Burrows stepped down after three and a half years for family reasons. Mitchel Frame and Dylan Lobban (U21), Andrew Fasanya and Jay Henderson (U17) and Cooper Masson (U19) were all called up for Scotland youth Internationals. The third kit was released and inspired by Craigievar Castle. The Dons played in the kit at Easter Road in a competitive score draw before the International break. Jack Searle signed a contract extension until the summer of 2028. Following a disciplinary hearing, the club were issued with an immediate reduction of 500 tickets from its allocation for the Premier Sports Cup semi-final against Rangers. Aussie Goalkeeper joined Ross County on loan until the end of the season.

=== October ===
During the International break, the club agreed a testimonial match with Dunfermline for their kitman of 33 years Mo Hutton with Aberdeen running out 4–1 winners in a very good workout for the Dons. However on return to League duties, they lost out through a VAR penalty at home to St Johnstone. The 'Emerging Talent Squad' progressed through the group stages to face Queens Park in the Round of 32. The home tie against Celtic was selected for television viewing. Three goals seen them bounce back in what was a great afternoon at home to St Mirren. The squad were hit with a virus and during a storm, they lost away to Dundee United. Lewis Mayo was ruled out for at least two months and Mats Knoester had injured his thigh in training. Connor Ronan had also injured his knee and was ruled out. Falkirk secured a third Premiership win in a row to deepen Aberdeen's gloom in what was a disappointing night. Ryan Naderi's late strike at Hampden breached a stubborn Aberdeen and seen them out at the Semi Final stage.

=== November ===
The 'Emerging Talent Squad' were knocked out on penalties at the Balmoral Stadium to Queens Park. Findlay Marshall, Mitchel Frame, Alfie Stewart, Andrew Fasanya, Cooper Masson & Dylan Ross were all called up for their upcoming youth Internationals. Before the home match with Hibernian, the club announced the passing of former forward Billy Little. Hibernian were rampant and put four goals past the Dons, a very sorry night which Aberdeen drop to 11th in the table. Hibernian had been bottom and without a win in the League since the end of August. The first time Hibs have scored four in the league away from home since March 2023. The first time a visiting team have scored four goals at Pittodrie without reply since October 2019. The first team other than Rangers or Celtic to win at Pittodrie by four clear goals since May 2016. On 9 November, Stephen Robinson was relieved of his duties along with assistant Stephen Craigan and first team coach Brian Kerr. Stuart Duff took on interim charge and first team training. The club and Community Trust were deeply saddened by the passing of Sir Jim Milne CBE. The club reported a record turnover of £24.4 million in its latest accounts for the financial year. On 15 November, Mario Frick was appointed as the new head coach with Roman Matter joining as assistant. Duff was attained as a first team coach with Craig Hinchcliffe continuing his role as goalkeeping coach. It was announced former Director Hugh Little had passed away. A heavy-metal display at Kilmarnock seen Mario Frick's first win as boss with four goals, Nisbet getting two and Findlay Marshall scoring his first for the club.

== Results & fixtures ==
Win Draw Loss Postponed

=== Pre-season and Friendlies ===
27 June 2026 Friendly	Cove Rangers	0–1	Aberdeen	Cove Bay
14:00 BST		AFC Report	Olusanya 4'	Stadium: Balmoral Stadium; Attendance: 1,657

27 June 2026 Friendly	Fraserburgh	3–1	Aberdeen XI	Fraserburgh
15:00 BST	Watt 4'; Barbour 20', 60'	AFC Report	Fasanya 42'	Stadium: Bellslea Park
Note: Scott Barbour Testimonial.

4 July 2026 Friendly	FC Twente	1–0	Aberdeen	Goor, Netherlands
14:00	Vennegoor of Hesselink 31'	AFC Report		Stadium: Sportcomplex GFC; Attendance: 1,600

4 July 2026 Friendly	Invergordon	1–9	Aberdeen XI	Invergordon
15:00 BST				Stadium: Recreation Grounds

7 July 2026 Friendly	Turriff United	1–1	Aberdeen XI	Turriff
20:00 BST				Stadium: The Haughs

11 July 2026 Friendly	Linfield	0–2	Aberdeen	Belfast, Northern Ireland
13:00		AFC Report	Lyons 6'; Lobban 36'	Stadium: Windsor Park; Attendance: 1,423

11 July 2026 Friendly	Inverurie Loco Works	3–1	Aberdeen XI	Inverurie
15:00 BST		AFC Report		Stadium: Harlaw Park

14 July 2026 Friendly	Keith	2–0	Aberdeen XI	Keith
19:30 BST		AFC Report		Stadium: Kynoch Park

3 October 2026 Mo Hutton Testimonial	Dunfermline	1–4	Aberdeen	Dunfermline, Fife
14:00 BST	Bray 44'	AFC Report	Milne 30'; Mouloua 47', 60'; Smith 81'	Stadium: East End Park; Attendance: 1,143

=== Scottish Premiership ===
1 August 2026 1	Aberdeen	2–1	Heart of Midlothian	Aberdeen
17:30	Mayo 90'; Nisbet 90+5' (pen.)	Report	McEntee 35'; Findlay (red card) 90+3'	Stadium: Pittodrie Stadium; Attendance: 18,513; Referee: David Dickinson
Note: Live on Sky Sports.

8 August 2026 2	Dundee	2–0	Aberdeen	Dundee
15:00	Westley 9'; Bevan 56'	Report		Stadium: Dens Park; Attendance: 8,204; Referee: Calum Scott

30 August 2026 3	Aberdeen	0–1	Rangers	Aberdeen
12:00		Report	Shankland 69' (pen.)	Stadium: Pittodrie Stadium; Attendance: 18,343; Referee: Matthew MacDermid
Note: Live on Sky Sports.

2 September 2026 4	Celtic	3–0	Aberdeen	Glasgow
19:45	Durán 14'; Nygren 34'; Yang 45+1'	Report		Stadium: Celtic Park; Attendance: 58,825; Referee: Duncan Nicolson

5 September 2026 5	Aberdeen	0–0	Kilmarnock	Aberdeen
15:00		Report	Tshibola (yellow card) 82' (yellow-red card)	Stadium: Pittodrie Stadium; Attendance: 14,824; Referee: John Beaton

15 September 2026 6	Motherwell	0–4	Aberdeen	Motherwell
19:45		Report	Molloy 38'; Ronan 46'; Mouloua 76'; Nisbet 87'	Stadium: Fir Park; Attendance: 6,965; Referee: Steven McLean

19 September 2026 7	Hibernian	1–1	Aberdeen	Edinburgh
15:00	Boyle 62' (pen.)	Report	Nisbet 17'	Stadium: Easter Road; Attendance: 17,899; Referee: Nick Walsh

11 October 2026 8	Aberdeen	0–1	St Johnstone	Aberdeen
15:00		Report	Fowler 14' (pen.)	Stadium: Pittodrie Stadium; Attendance: 16,706; Referee: Ryan Lee

17 October 2026 9	Aberdeen	3–1	St Mirren	Aberdeen
15:00	Lyons 2'; Nisbet 58'; Mouloua 72'	Report	Sule 42'	Stadium: Pittodrie Stadium; Attendance: 17,020; Referee: John Beaton

24 October 2026 10	Dundee United	3–2	Aberdeen	Dundee
15:00	Iqbal 14'; Tait 27'; Sapsford 72'	Report	Guinness-Walker 25'; Ronan 56'	Stadium: Tannadice Park; Attendance: 10,697; Referee: David Dickinson

28 October 2026 11	Aberdeen	0–1	Falkirk	Aberdeen
19:45		Report	Krauhaus 73'	Stadium: Pittodrie Stadium; Attendance: 14,007; Referee: Calum Scott

7 November 2026 12	Aberdeen	0–4	Hibernian	Aberdeen
17:45		Report	McGrath 57'; Wright 79'; Cadden 87'; Klidjé 90+3'	Stadium: Pittodrie Stadium; Attendance: 15,548; Referee: Duncan Nicolson
Note: Live on Premier Sports.

21 November 2026 13	Kilmarnock	2–4	Aberdeen	Kilmarnock
15:00	Kiltie 19'; John-Jules 57'	Report	Nisbet 8', 12'; Lyons 30'; Marshall 86'	Stadium: Rugby Park; Attendance: 5,470; Referee: Nick Walsh

24 November 2026 14	Rangers	v	Aberdeen	Glasgow
19:45				Stadium: Ibrox Stadium

28 November 2026 15	Aberdeen	v	Dundee	Aberdeen
15:00				Stadium: Pittodrie Stadium

=== Scottish League Cup ===
==== Group stage ====
14 July 2026 Group stage	Brora Rangers	0–2	Aberdeen	Brora
19:45		Report	Nisbet 35' (pen.), 76'	Stadium: Dudgeon Park; Attendance: 1,500; Referee: Josh Hay

18 July 2026 Group stage	Aberdeen	2–1	Queen's Park	Aberdeen
17:00	Happe 3'; Smith 11'	Report	Hamilton 61'	Stadium: Pittodrie Stadium; Attendance: 7,350; Referee: Colin Steven
Note: Live on Premier Sports.

22 July 2026 Group stage	Queen of the South	1–4	Aberdeen	Dumfries
19:45	Clark 14'	Report	Nisbet 37' (pen.), 70', 72'; Lyons 82'	Stadium: Palmerston Park; Attendance: 1,647; Referee: Lloyd Wilson
Note: Live on Premier Sports.

25 July 2026 Group stage	Aberdeen	3–0	Kelty Hearts	Aberdeen
15:00	Nisbet 2' (pen.); Kjartansson 27'; Olusanya 50'	Report		Stadium: Pittodrie Stadium; Attendance: 7,078; Referee: Ryan Lee

==== Knockout phase ====
15 August 2026 Second round	Aberdeen	3–0	Dundee	Aberdeen
15:00	Nisbet 51', 63'; Ntelo 57'	Report		Stadium: Pittodrie Stadium; Attendance: 10,018; Referee: Nick Walsh

12 September 2026 Quarter–finals	Kilmarnock	1–1 (1–3 p)	Aberdeen	Kilmarnock
17:45	John-Jules 58'	Report	Nisbet 52'; Happe (yellow card) (yellow-red card) 57'	Stadium: Rugby Park; Attendance: 6,401; Referee: Don Robertson

31 October 2026 Semi–finals	Rangers	1–0	Aberdeen	Glasgow
17:30	Naderi 83'	Report		Stadium: Hampden Park; Attendance: 43,567; Referee: Ryan Lee

== Squad statistics ==
=== Appearances ===
As of 21 November 2026

No.	Pos	Player	Premiership		League Cup		Scottish Cup		Total	
No.	Pos	Player	Apps	Goals	Apps	Goals	Apps	Goals	Apps	Goals
2	DF	(Scotland) Nicky Devlin	2+1	0	1+1	0	0	0	5	0
5	DF	(Netherlands) Mats Knoester	5+1	0	1	0	0	0	7	0
7	MF	(England) Tony Yogane	5+2	0	4+2	0	0	0	13	0
8	MF	(Northern Ireland) Brad Lyons	7	2	2	1	0	0	9	3
9	FW	(Morocco) Ayoub Mouloua	4+8	2	1+5	0	0	0	18	2
10	MF	(Austria) Alexander Briedl	3+3	0	1+2	0	0	0	9	0
11	MF	(Scotland) Lewis Smith	3+8	0	4+1	1	0	0	16	1
14	MF	(France) Hicham Mahou	2+3	0	0	0	0	0	5	0
15	FW	(Scotland) Kevin Nisbet	13	6	7	9	0	0	20	15
17	MF	(Scotland) Stuart Armstrong	6+7	0	2+2	0	0	0	17	0
18	MF	(Croatia) Ante Palaversa	1	0	0	0	0	0	1	0
20	FW	(England) Toyosi Olusanya	6+5	0	2+4	1	0	0	17	1
21	DF	(Republic of Ireland) Gavin Molloy	7+2	1	2+3	0	0	0	14	1
22	DF	(Scotland) Jack Milne	5+4	0	3+2	0	0	0	14	0
23	DF	(Scotland) Lewis Mayo	7	1	6	0	0	0	13	1
24	DF	(England) Nesta Guinness-Walker	13	1	6+1	0	0	0	20	1
25	MF	(Republic of Ireland) Connor Ronan	8+1	2	6+1	0	0	0	16	2
26	DF	(England) Dan Happe	6+2	0	5	1	0	0	13	1
27	GK	(Germany) Marius Müller	13	0	6	0	0	0	19	0
28	DF	(Scotland) Chris Cadden	11	0	2	0	0	0	13	0
31	FW	(Belgium) Mitchy Ntelo	2+2	0	2+1	1	0	0	7	1
32	MF	(Nigeria) Afeez Aremu	8+2	0	6	0	0	0	16	0
40	MF	(Scotland) Findlay Marshall	3+5	1	0+3	0	0	0	11	1
53	FW	(Scotland) Andrew Fasanya	0+1	0	0+1	0	0	0	2	0
77	DF	(Germany) Emmanuel Gyamfi	0+1	0	1	0	0	0	2	0
Players who left the club during the season
1	GK	(Bulgaria) Dimitar Mitov	0	0	1	0	0	0	1	0
14	MF	(Sweden) Kenan Bilalović	0	0	0+1	0	0	0	1	0
16	DF	(Scotland) Dylan Lobban	0	0	2	0	0	0	2	0
19	FW	(Australia) Kusini Yengi	0	0	0	0	0	0	0	0
29	MF	(Iceland) Kjartan Már Kjartansson	0	0	1+1	1	0	0	2	1

=== Goalscorers ===
As of 21 November 2026

Ranking	Nation	Number	Name	Scottish Premiership	League Cup	Scottish Cup	Total
1	(Scotland)	15	Kevin Nisbet	6	9	0	15
2	(Northern Ireland)	8	Brad Lyons	2	1	0	3
=	(Morocco)	9	Ayoub Mouloua	2	0	0	2
=	(Republic of Ireland)	25	Connor Ronan	2	0	0	2
3	(Scotland)	11	Lewis Smith	0	1	0	1
=	(England)	20	Toyosi Olusanya	0	1	0	1
=	(Republic of Ireland)	21	Gavin Molloy	1	0	0	1
=	(Scotland)	23	Lewis Mayo	1	0	0	1
=	(England)	24	Nesta Guinness-Walker	1	0	0	1
=	(England)	26	Dan Happe	0	1	0	1
=	(Iceland)	29	Kjartan Már Kjartansson	0	1	0	1
=	(Belgium)	31	Mitchy Ntelo	0	1	0	1
=	(Scotland)	40	Findlay Marshall	1	0	0	1
TOTALS				16	15	0	31

== Club statistics ==
=== Competition Overview ===
Competition	First match	Last match	Record							
Competition	First match	Last match	Pld	W	D	L	GF	GA	GD	Win %
Premiership	1 August 2026	May 2027	13	4	2	7	16	20	−4	30.77
League Cup	14 July 2026	31 October 2026	7	5	1	1	15	4	+11	71.43
Scottish Cup	January 2027	2027	0	0	0	0	0	0	+0	—
Total			20	9	3	8	31	24	+7	45.00

Source: Competitions

=== League table ===
Pos	Team	Pld	W	D	L	GF	GA	GD	Pts	Qualification or relegation (Note: Teams play each other three times (33 matches), before the league is split into two groups (the top six and the bottom six).)
6	St Johnstone	14	4	5	5	18	22	−4	17	
7	Dundee	13	5	2	6	18	23	−5	17	
8	Aberdeen	13	4	2	7	16	20	−4	14	
9	St Mirren	14	4	2	8	13	26	−13	14	
10	Motherwell	14	3	4	7	16	23	−7	13	

Updated to match(es) played on 21 November 2026. Source:
Rules for classification: 1) Points; 2) Goal difference; 3) Goals scored; 4) Head-to-head points; 5) Head-to-head goal difference; 6) Play-off (only if deciding champion, UEFA competition qualification, second stage group allocation, or relegation).

=== Results by round ===
Round	1	2	3	4	5	6	7	8	9	10	11	12	13
Ground	H	A	H	A	H	A	A	H	H	A	H	H	A
Result	W	L	L	L	D	W	D	L	W	L	L	L	W
Position	3	8	10	10	10	8	7	8	7	9	10	11	8

Updated to match(es) played on 7 November 2026. Source:
A = Away; H = Home; W = Win; D = Draw; L = Loss

=== League cup table ===
Pos	Team	Pld	W	PW	PL	L	GF	GA	GD	Pts	Qualification	ABE	QPA	KEL	QOS	BRO
1	Aberdeen	4	4	0	0	0	11	2	+9	12	Qualification for the second round	—	2–1	3–0	—	—
2	Queen's Park	4	3	0	0	1	9	4	+5	9		—	—	—	3–1	3–1
3	Kelty Hearts	4	1	1	0	2	4	8	−4	5		—	0–2	—	—	3–2
4	Queen of the South	4	1	0	1	2	6	8	−2	4		1–4	—	1–1p	—	—
5	Brora Rangers	4	0	0	0	4	3	11	−8	0		0–2	—	—	0–3	—

Rules for classification: 1) goal difference, 2) goals scored, 3) away goals scored, 4) matches won, 5) away matches won, 6) drawing of lots.

== Transfers ==
=== Players in ===
Date	Pos	Player	From	Fee	Ref
28 May 2026	DF	(Scotland) Lewis Mayo	(Scotland) Kilmarnock	Free	
28 May 2026	MF	(Northern Ireland) Brad Lyons	(Scotland) Kilmarnock	Free	
28 May 2026	MF	(Austria) Alexander Briedl	(Austria) Blau-Weiß Linz	Free	
5 June 2026	DF	(England) Dan Happe	(England) Leyton Orient	Free	
16 June 2026	FW	(England) Toyosi Olusanya	(United States) Houston Dynamo	Free	
17 June 2026	MF	(Republic of Ireland) Connor Ronan	(United States) Colorado Rapids	Free	
19 June 2026	MF	(England) Tony Yogane	(England) Brentford	Undisclosed	
28 June 2026	FW	(Morocco) Ayoub Mouloua	(Morocco) FUS Rabat	£628,000	
8 July 2026	DF	(England) Nesta Guinness-Walker	(England) Northampton Town	Free	
13 July 2026	MF	(Scotland) Lewis Smith	(Scotland) Livingston	£300,000	
16 July 2026	GK	(Germany) Marius Müller	(Germany) VFL Wolfsburg	£429,000	
31 July 2026	DF	(Scotland) Chris Cadden	(Scotland) Hibernian	£200,000	
8 August 2026	FW	(Belgium) Mitchy Ntelo	(Switzerland) Yverdon-Sport	Undisclosed	
9 September 2026	FW	(France) Hicham Mahou	(Switzerland) Lugano	Free	

=== Players out ===
Date	Pos	Player	To	Fee	Ref
25 May 2025	FW	(Scotland) Ryan Duncan	(Scotland) Inverness CT	Free	
25 May 2025	FW	(Netherlands) Vicente Besuijen	(Netherlands) FC Eindhoven	Free	
25 May 2025	DF	(Scotland) Tom McIntyre	(England) Forest Green Rovers	Free	
25 May 2025	DF	(Uganda) Elvis Bwomono	(Iceland) Keflavik	Free	
26 May 2025	MF	(Scotland) Graeme Shinnie	(Scotland) Inverness CT	Free	
12 June 2026	GK	(Norway) Per Kristian Bråtveit	(Norway) Haugesund	Free	
6 July 2026	DF	(Denmark) Alexander Jensen	(Sweden) Elfsborg	£500,000	
10 July 2026	FW	(Finland) Topi Keskinen	(Denmark) Odense	£1,100,000	
13 July 2026	FW	(Serbia) Marko Lazetić	(Armenia) Noah	Undisclosed	
13 August 2026	GK	(Bulgaria) Dimitar Mitov	(Germany) St. Pauli	£430,000	
13 August 2026	MF	(Iceland) Kjartan Már Kjartansson	(Norway) SK Brann	£600,000	
18 August 2026	FW	(Nigeria) Peter Ambrose	(Switzerland) Neuchâtel Xamax	£250,000	

- Please note all are reported transfer fees.

=== Loans out ===
Date	Pos	Player	To	Ref
26 June 2026	FW	(Scotland) Alfie Bavidge	(Scotland) Inverness CT	
7 July 2026	MF	(Scotland) Alfie Stewart	(Scotland) Inverness CT	
8 July 2026	FW	(Scotland) Sam McLean	(Scotland) Elgin City	
8 July 2026	MF	(Scotland) Aaron Cummings	(Scotland) Elgin City	
8 July 2026	DF	(Scotland) James Jarvie	(Scotland) Deveronvale	
10 July 2026	DF	(Scotland) Lewis Carrol	(Scotland) Peterhead	
10 July 2026	FW	(Scotland) Jack Searle	(Scotland) Peterhead	
10 July 2026	FW	(Scotland) Zak To	(Scotland) Peterhead	
10 July 2026	DF	(Scotland) Jay Henderson	(Scotland) Turriff United	
10 July 2026	FW	(Scotland) Bradley Chikomo	(Scotland) Turriff United	
10 July 2026	MF	(Scotland) JJ Hulse	(Scotland) Buckie Thistle	
10 July 2026	GK	(Scotland) Theo Simpson	(Scotland) Buckie Thistle	
13 July 2026	GK	(Scotland) Conlan Waldron	(Scotland) Banchory St Ternan	
14 July 2026	DF	(Scotland) Dylan Ross	(Scotland) Cove Rangers	
14 July 2026	FW	(Scotland) Joseph Teasdale	(Scotland) Cove Rangers	
21 July 2026	DF	(Scotland) Max Pocklington	(Scotland) Keith	
21 July 2026	MF	(Scotland) Heath Duncan	(Scotland) Keith	
7 August 2026	GK	(Latvia) Rodrigo Vitols	(Scotland) Fraserburgh	
14 August 2026	DF	(Scotland) Dylan Lobban	(Scotland) Dunfermline Athletic	
28 August 2026	DF	(Scotland) Joel Okhuoya	(Scotland) Formartine United	
31 August 2026	FW	(Australia) Kusini Yengi	(Japan) Sanfrecce Hiroshima	
4 September 2026	MF	(Sweden) Kenan Bilalović	(Slovakia) MŠK Žilina	
28 September 2026	GK	(Australia) Nicholas Suman	(Scotland) Ross County	

== See also ==
- List of Aberdeen F.C. seasons
