= 2026–27 Hibernian F.C. season =

Hibernian
2026–27 season
- Chairman: Malcolm McPherson
- Manager: David Gray (until 16 September); Marink Reedijk (from 24 September)
- Stadium: Easter Road
- League Cup: Final
- Conference League: Play-off round
- Top goalscorer: League: Martin Boyle (3); All: Owen Elding (5)
| Home colours | Away colours | Third colours |

The 2026–27 season is the 150th season of football played by Hibernian, a professional football club based in Edinburgh, Scotland. The club is competing in the top tier of Scottish football, the Scottish Premiership, for the tenth consecutive season. They lost in the playoff round of the Conference League to Gent, and are also competing in the Scottish Cup and the League Cup.

== Results and fixtures ==
=== Pre-season friendlies ===
Hibernian's score is shown first in each case.

Hibernian pre-season results
| Date | Venue | Opponents | Score | Hibernian scorers | Att. | Ref. |
|---|---|---|---|---|---|---|
| 30 June 2026 | Tallaght Stadium, Dublin (A) | Shamrock Rovers | 0–1 | — | 2,732 | Report |
| 4 July 2026 | Carton House, Maynooth (A) | Cliftonville | 5–1 | Kerr, N. Cadden, Boyle, Klidjé (2) | None | Report |
| 11 July 2026 | CTFD PortoGaia, Vila Nova de Gaia (A) | Porto | 1–1 | Passlack | None | Report |
| 18 July 2026 | Easter Road, Edinburgh (H) | Brøndby | 2–1 | Lowe (2) | — | Report |

=== Scottish Premiership ===
Hibernian's score is shown first in each case.

Hibernian in the 2026–27 Scottish Premiership
| Date | Venue | Opponents | Score | Hibernian scorers | Att. | Ref. |
|---|---|---|---|---|---|---|
| 2 August 2026 | Easter Road, Edinburgh (H) | Motherwell | 1–2 | Boyle 56' (pen.) | 17,440 | Report |
| 9 August 2026 | Ibrox Stadium, Glasgow (A) | Rangers | 2–1 | Campbell 12' (pen.), Wright 90+3' | 50,893 | Report |
| 30 August 2026 | Dens Park, Dundee (A) | Dundee | 2–1 | Boyle 25', Wright 61' | 6,534 | Report |
| 3 September 2026 | Easter Road, Edinburgh (H) | Heart of Midlothian | 1–3 | Mayor 51' | 19,656 | Report |
| 6 September 2026 | McDiarmid Park, Perth (A) | St Johnstone | 1–2 | Lowe 29' | 5,793 | Report |
| 15 September 2026 | Easter Road, Edinburgh (H) | Kilmarnock | 0–1 | — | 15,493 | Report |
| 19 September 2026 | Easter Road, Edinburgh (H) | Aberdeen | 1–1 | Boyle 62' (pen.) | 17,899 | Report |
| 10 October 2026 | Tannadice Park, Dundee (A) | Dundee United | 0–1 | — | 10,331 | Report |
| 17 October 2026 | Easter Road, Edinburgh (H) | Falkirk | 1–2 | Elding 41' | 18,390 | Report |
| 25 October 2026 | Easter Road, Edinburgh (H) | Celtic | 1–2 | Elding 3' | 17,389 | Report |
| 28 October 2026 | St Mirren Park, Paisley (A) | St Mirren | 1–1 | Ivezić 78' | 6,573 | Report |
| 7 November 2026 | Pittodrie Stadium, Aberdeen (A) | Aberdeen | 4–0 | McGrath 57', Wright 79', Cadden 87', Klidjé 90+3' | 15,548 | Report |
| 21 November 2026 | Easter Road, Edinburgh (H) | Dundee United | 0–4 | | 17,001 | Report |

=== Scottish League Cup ===
Having finished in the European qualification places, Hibs entered the League Cup in the second round (last 16).

Hibernian's score is shown first in each case.

Hibernian in the 2026–27 League Cup
| Date | Round | Venue | Opponents | Score | Hibernian scorers | Att. | Ref. |
|---|---|---|---|---|---|---|---|
| 16 August 2026 | Second round | Easter Road, Edinburgh (H) | Partick Thistle | 1–0 | Elding 12' | 10,608 | Report |
| 12 September 2026 | Quarter-finals | Victoria Park, Dingwall (A) | Ross County | 3–0 | Klidjé 7', Mayor 14' (pen.), Šuto 39' | 4,003 | Report |
| 1 November 2026 | Semi-finals | Hampden Park, Glasgow (N) | Heart of Midlothian | 2–1 | Boyle 19', McGrath 42' | 41,673 | Report |
| 13 December 2026 | Final | Hampden Park, Glasgow (N) | Rangers | | | | |

=== Scottish Cup ===
Hibernian's score is shown first in each case.

Hibernian in the 2026–27 Scottish Cup
| Date | Round | Venue | Opponents | Score | Hibernian scorers | Att. | Ref. |
|---|---|---|---|---|---|---|---|
| January 2027 | Fourth round | | | | | | |

=== UEFA Conference League ===
Having finished fifth in the 2025–26 Scottish Premiership, Hibernian entered the UEFA Conference League in the second qualifying round. After suffering a 2–0 defeat in the first leg against Malisheva in Kosovo, Hibs progressed to the third round with a 4–1 win in the return game.

Hibernian's score is shown first in each case.

Hibernian in the 2026–27 UEFA Conference League
| Date | Round | Venue | Opponents | Score | Hibernian scorers | Att. | Ref. |
|---|---|---|---|---|---|---|---|
| 23 July 2026 | Second qualifying round | Fadil Vokrri Stadium, Pristina (A) | (Kosovo) Malisheva | 0–2 | — | 2,873 | Report |
| 30 July 2026 | Second qualifying round | Easter Road, Edinburgh (H) | (Kosovo) Malisheva | 4–1 | Elding 9', Passlack 15', Lowe 35', Boyle 57' | 15,182 | Report |
| 6 August 2026 | Third qualifying round | Easter Road, Edinburgh (H) | (North Macedonia) Shkëndija | 2–1 | Elding 73', O'Hora 90' | 13,132 | Report |
| 13 August 2026 | Third qualifying round | Toše Proeski Arena, Skopje (A) | (North Macedonia) Shkëndija | 0–0 | — | 7,200 | Report |
| 20 August 2026 | Play-off round | Planet Group Arena, Ghent (A) | (Belgium) Gent | 0–0 | — | 10,557 | Report |
| 27 August 2026 | Play-off round | Easter Road, Edinburgh (H) | (Belgium) Gent | 2–3 | Kerr 56', Passlack 77' | 18,997 | Report |

== Player statistics ==
As of 21 November 2026

| No. | Pos | Player | Premiership | | League Cup | | Scottish Cup | | Conference League | | Total | |
| No. | Pos | Player | Apps | Goals | Apps | Goals | Apps | Goals | Apps | Goals | Apps | Goals |
Goalkeepers
| 1 | GK | (Austria) Raphael Sallinger | 13 | 0 | 2 | 0 | 0 | 0 | 6 | 0 | 21 | 0 |
Defenders
| 3 | DF | (England) Adam Mayor | 8+1 | 1 | 2 | 1 | 0 | 0 | 6 | 0 | 17 | 2 |
| 4 | DF | (Scotland) Grant Hanley | 4+2 | 0 | 0 | 0 | 0 | 0 | 1 | 0 | 7 | 0 |
| 5 | DF | (Republic of Ireland) Warren O'Hora | 2 | 0 | 1 | 0 | 0 | 0 | 6 | 1 | 9 | 1 |
| 5 | DF | (Serbia) Marko Ivezić | 4 | 1 | 0 | 0 | 0 | 0 | 0 | 0 | 4 | 1 |
| 6 | DF | (Scotland) Jason Kerr | 13 | 0 | 2 | 0 | 0 | 0 | 5 | 1 | 20 | 1 |
| 12 | DF | (Scotland) Chris Cadden | 0 | 0 | 0 | 0 | 0 | 0 | 0+1 | 0 | 1 | 0 |
| 12 | DF | (Wales) Alex Williams | 1+1 | 0 | 0+1 | 0 | 0 | 0 | 0 | 0 | 3 | 0 |
| 15 | DF | (Australia) Jack Iredale | 5+1 | 0 | 2 | 0 | 0 | 0 | 1 | 0 | 9 | 0 |
| 19 | DF | (Scotland) Nicky Cadden | 1+5 | 1 | 0+1 | 0 | 0 | 0 | 0 | 0 | 7 | 1 |
| 21 | DF | (England) Jordan Obita | 4 | 0 | 0 | 0 | 0 | 0 | 6 | 0 | 10 | 0 |
| 25 | DF | (Germany) Felix Passlack | 11+1 | 0 | 1+1 | 0 | 0 | 0 | 6 | 2 | 20 | 2 |
| 27 | DF | (England) Kanayo Megwa | 2+1 | 0 | 2 | 0 | 0 | 0 | 0+2 | 0 | 7 | 0 |
Midfielders
| 8 | MF | (Scotland) Josh Mulligan | 13 | 0 | 2 | 0 | 0 | 0 | 6 | 0 | 21 | 0 |
| 11 | MF | (England) Joe Newell | 4+2 | 0 | 2 | 0 | 0 | 0 | 0+4 | 0 | 12 | 0 |
| 14 | MF | (Zambia) Miguel Chaiwa | 10+3 | 0 | 0+2 | 0 | 0 | 0 | 6 | 0 | 21 | 0 |
| 17 | MF | (Republic of Ireland) Jamie McGrath | 7+2 | 1 | 1 | 0 | 0 | 0 | 1+2 | 0 | 13 | 1 |
| 20 | MF | (Scotland) Rudi Molotnikov | 0+1 | 0 | 0 | 0 | 0 | 0 | 0 | 0 | 1 | 0 |
| 23 | MF | (England) Callum Wright | 5+4 | 3 | 1 | 0 | 0 | 0 | 1+2 | 0 | 13 | 3 |
| 24 | MF | (Republic of Ireland) Jacob Devaney | 4+2 | 0 | 0+1 | 0 | 0 | 0 | 0 | 0 | 7 | 0 |
| 32 | MF | (Scotland) Josh Campbell | 1 | 1 | 0+1 | 0 | 0 | 0 | 1+2 | 0 | 5 | 1 |
| 39 | MF | (Wales) Rabbi Matondo | 0+6 | 0 | 0 | 0 | 0 | 0 | 0 | 0 | 6 | 0 |
| 47 | MF | (Sierra Leone) Azeem Abdulai | 1+3 | 0 | 0 | 0 | 0 | 0 | 0+3 | 0 | 7 | 0 |
Forwards
| 7 | FW | (Republic of Ireland) Owen Elding | 8+2 | 2 | 1 | 1 | 0 | 0 | 5 | 2 | 16 | 5 |
| 9 | FW | (England) Nathan Lowe | 4+4 | 1 | 1+1 | 0 | 0 | 0 | 6 | 1 | 16 | 2 |
| 10 | FW | (Australia) Martin Boyle | 8+2 | 3 | 0+1 | 0 | 0 | 0 | 4+2 | 1 | 17 | 4 |
| 18 | FW | (Togo) Thibault Klidjé | 5+6 | 1 | 1 | 1 | 0 | 0 | 0+3 | 0 | 15 | 2 |
| 22 | FW | (Australia) Ante Šuto | 2+7 | 0 | 1+1 | 1 | 0 | 0 | 0+2 | 0 | 13 | 1 |

== Club statistics ==
=== League table ===
| Pos | Team | Pld | W | D | L | GF | GA | GD | Pts | Qualification or relegation (Note: Teams play each other three times (33 matches), before the league is split into two groups (the top six and the bottom six).) |
|---|---|---|---|---|---|---|---|---|---|---|
| 8 | Aberdeen | 13 | 4 | 2 | 7 | 16 | 20 | −4 | 14 | |
| 9 | St Mirren | 14 | 4 | 2 | 8 | 13 | 26 | −13 | 14 | |
| 10 | Motherwell | 14 | 3 | 4 | 7 | 16 | 23 | −7 | 13 | |
| 11 | Hibernian | 13 | 3 | 2 | 8 | 15 | 21 | −6 | 11 | Qualification for the Premiership play-off final |
| 12 | Kilmarnock | 14 | 2 | 3 | 9 | 15 | 33 | −18 | 9 | Relegation to the Championship |

Updated to match(es) played on 21 November 2026. Source:
Rules for classification: 1) Points; 2) Goal difference; 3) Goals scored; 4) Head-to-head points; 5) Head-to-head goal difference; 6) Play-off (only if deciding champion, UEFA competition qualification, second stage group allocation, or relegation).

=== Management statistics ===
As of 21 November 2026

| Name | From | To | P | W | D | L | Win% (Note: Win% is the percentage of matches won rounded to two decimal places.) |
|---|---|---|---|---|---|---|---|
| (Scotland) David Gray | 6 June 2024 | 16 September 2026 | 14 | 6 | 2 | 6 | 42.86 |
| (Scotland) John Potter (interim) | 16 September 2026 | 24 September 2026 | 1 | 0 | 1 | 0 | 0.00 |
| (Netherlands) Marink Reedijk | 24 September 2026 | Present | 7 | 2 | 1 | 4 | 28.57 |

== Transfers ==
=== Players in ===
| Player | From | Fee |
|---|---|---|
| (Scotland) Jason Kerr | (England) Wigan Athletic | Free |
| (England) Callum Wright | (England) Plymouth Argyle | Free |
| (Sierra Leone) Azeem Abdulai | (England) Leyton Orient | Undisclosed |
| (England) Adam Mayor | (England) Millwall | Undisclosed |
| (United States) Colton Swan | (United States) Charleston Battery | Undisclosed |
| (Serbia) Marko Ivezić | (Germany) Holstein Kiel | Undisclosed |
| (Wales) Rabbi Matondo | (Norway) SK Brann | Free |

=== Players out ===
| Player | To | Fee |
|---|---|---|
| (France) Élie Youan | (Poland) Wisla Krakow | Free |
| (Scotland) Chris Cadden | (Scotland) Aberdeen | Undisclosed |
| (The Gambia) Alasana Manneh | (Denmark) Kolding IF | Free |
| (Republic of Ireland) Warren O'Hora | (England) Leicester City | Undisclosed |

=== Loans in ===
| Player | From |
|---|---|
| (England) Nathan Lowe | (England) Stoke City |
| (Republic of Ireland) Jacob Devaney | (England) Manchester United |
| (Wales) Alex Williams | (England) West Bromwich Albion |

=== Loans out ===
| Player | To |
|---|---|
| (Scotland) Zach Bruce | (Scotland) Stranraer |
| (Scotland) Lewis Gillie | (Scotland) Stranraer |
| (Scotland) Murray Johnson | (Republic of Ireland) Shelbourne |
| (Scotland) Josh Campbell | (Scotland) St Johnstone |
| (Scotland) Jacob MacIntyre | (Scotland) Arbroath |
| (Scotland) Rudi Molotnikov | (Scotland) Arbroath |

== See also ==
- List of Hibernian F.C. seasons
