= 2026–27 Scottish League Cup =

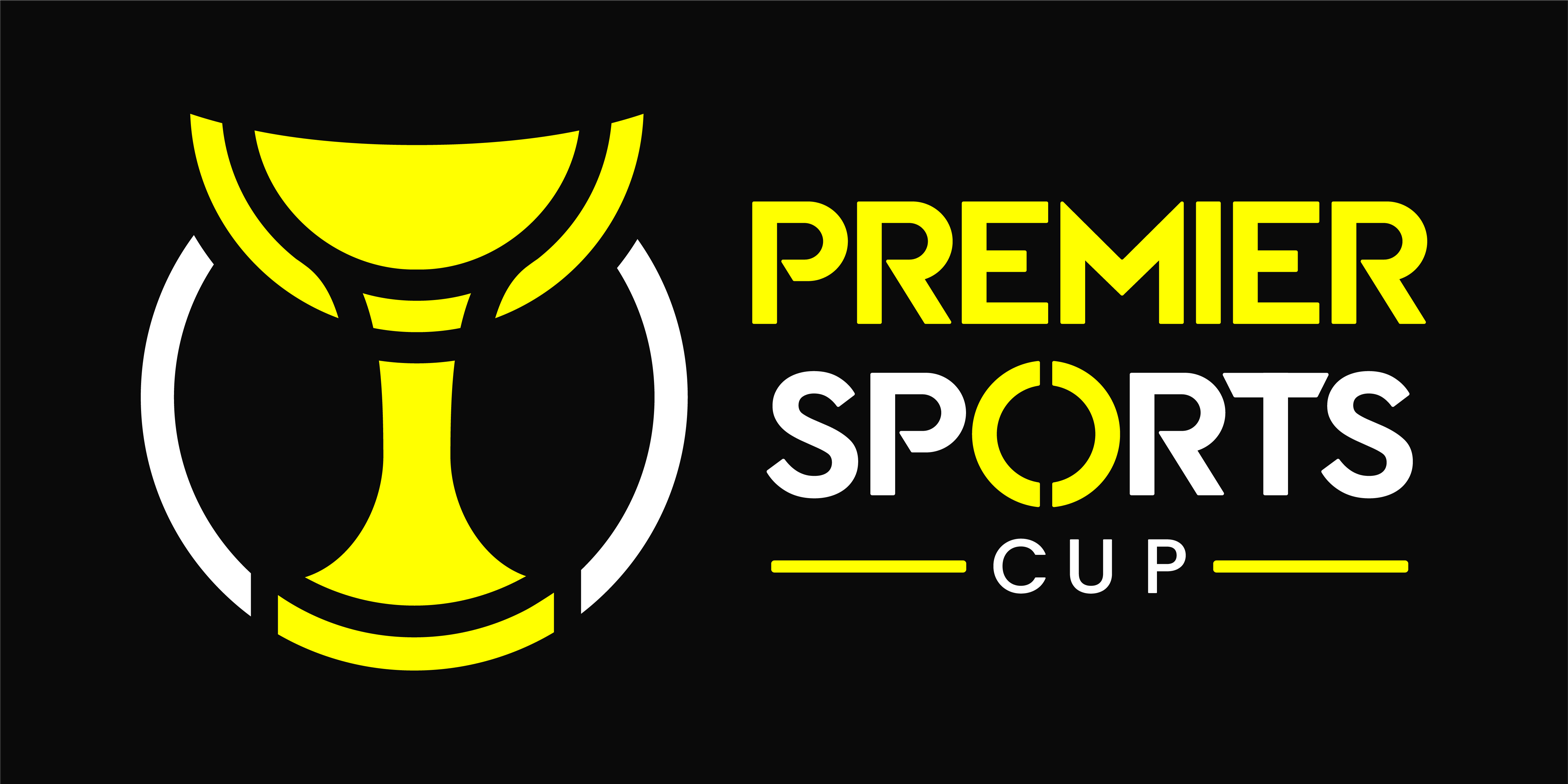
- Premier Sports Cup logo

Tournament details
- Country: Scotland
- Dates: 11 July – 13 December 2026
- Teams: 45

Tournament statistics
- Matches played: 94
- Goals scored: 289 (3.07 per match)
- Attendance: 335,869 (3,573 per match)
- Top goal scorer(s): Kevin Nisbet (9 goals)
- All statistics correct as of 1 November 2026. Defending champions St Mirren

The 2026–27 Scottish League Cup, also known as the Premier Sports Cup for sponsorship reasons, is the 81st season of Scotland's second-most prestigious football knockout competition.

== Schedule ==
| Round | First match date | Fixtures | Clubs |
|---|---|---|---|
| Group stage | 11 July 2026 | 80 | 45 → 16 |
| Second round | 15 August 2026 | 8 | 16 → 8 |
| Quarter-finals | 12 September 2026 | 4 | 8 → 4 |
| Semi-finals | 31 October 2026 | 2 | 4 → 2 |
| Final | 13 December 2026 | 1 | 2 → 1 |

== Format ==
The competition begins with eight groups of five teams. The five clubs initially competing in the UEFA Champions League (Celtic and Heart of Midlothian), Europa League (Rangers) and Conference League (Motherwell and Hibernian) receive a bye to the second round. The group stage consists of 40 teams:

- all remaining teams that competed across the SPFL in 2025–26,
- the 2025–26 Highland Football League champions (Brora Rangers) and runners-up (Brechin City), and
- the 2025–26 Lowland Football League champions (Linlithgow Rose).

The winners of each of the eight groups, as well as the three best runners-up, progress to the second round, where they are joined by the five teams given byes (last 16; 8 + 3 + 5). At this stage, the competition reverts to the traditional knock-out format. The three group winners with the highest points total and the European entrants are seeded.

=== Bonus point system ===
Three points are awarded for a win and one point for a draw. In each group stage match that finishes in a draw, there is a penalty shoot-out, with the winner being awarded a bonus point.

== Group stage ==
The teams were seeded according to their final league positions in 2025–26 and drawn into eight groups, with each group comprising one team from each pot. The draw for the group stage took place on 27 May 2026 and was broadcast live on the Premier Sports Player and SPFL YouTube channel.

=== Group A ===
| Pos | Team | Pld | W | PW | PL | L | GF | GA | GD | Pts | Qualification | ABE | QPA | KEL | QOS | BRO |
|---|---|---|---|---|---|---|---|---|---|---|---|---|---|---|---|---|
| 1 | Aberdeen | 4 | 4 | 0 | 0 | 0 | 11 | 2 | +9 | 12 | Qualification for the second round | — | 2–1 | 3–0 | — | — |
| 2 | Queen's Park | 4 | 3 | 0 | 0 | 1 | 9 | 4 | +5 | 9 | | — | — | — | 3–1 | 3–1 |
| 3 | Kelty Hearts | 4 | 1 | 1 | 0 | 2 | 4 | 8 | −4 | 5 | | — | 0–2 | — | — | 3–2 |
| 4 | Queen of the South | 4 | 1 | 0 | 1 | 2 | 6 | 8 | −2 | 4 | | 1–4 | — | 1–1p | — | — |
| 5 | Brora Rangers | 4 | 0 | 0 | 0 | 4 | 3 | 11 | −8 | 0 | | 0–2 | — | — | 0–3 | — |

Rules for classification: 1) goal difference, 2) goals scored, 3) away goals scored, 4) matches won, 5) away matches won, 6) drawing of lots.

=== Group B ===
| Pos | Team | Pld | W | PW | PL | L | GF | GA | GD | Pts | Qualification | DUN | MON | ARB | STI | SPA |
|---|---|---|---|---|---|---|---|---|---|---|---|---|---|---|---|---|
| 1 | Dundee United | 4 | 3 | 0 | 0 | 1 | 8 | 1 | +7 | 9 | Qualification for the second round | — | — | 3–0 | — | 4–0 |
| 2 | Montrose | 4 | 3 | 0 | 0 | 1 | 5 | 2 | +3 | 9 | | 1–0 | — | — | — | 0–2 |
| 3 | Arbroath | 4 | 2 | 0 | 0 | 2 | 3 | 6 | −3 | 6 | | — | 0–2 | — | 1–0 | — |
| 4 | Stirling Albion | 4 | 1 | 0 | 0 | 3 | 3 | 5 | −2 | 3 | | 0–1 | 0–2 | — | — | — |
| 5 | The Spartans | 4 | 1 | 0 | 0 | 3 | 4 | 9 | −5 | 3 | | — | — | 1–2 | 1–3 | — |

Rules for classification: 1) goal difference, 2) goals scored, 3) away goals scored, 4) matches won, 5) away matches won, 6) drawing of lots.

=== Group C ===
| Pos | Team | Pld | W | PW | PL | L | GF | GA | GD | Pts | Qualification | STM | DNF | EKB | DUM | COV |
|---|---|---|---|---|---|---|---|---|---|---|---|---|---|---|---|---|
| 1 | St Mirren | 4 | 3 | 0 | 0 | 1 | 12 | 4 | +8 | 9 | Qualification for the second round | — | 0–1 | 4–3 | — | — |
| 2 | Dunfermline Athletic | 4 | 3 | 0 | 0 | 1 | 10 | 4 | +6 | 9 | Qualification for the second round | — | — | — | 4–1 | 5–0 |
| 3 | East Kilbride | 4 | 2 | 0 | 0 | 2 | 13 | 10 | +3 | 6 | | — | 3–0 | — | 5–3 | — |
| 4 | Dumbarton | 4 | 1 | 0 | 0 | 3 | 6 | 13 | −7 | 3 | | 0–4 | — | — | — | 2–0 |
| 5 | Cove Rangers | 4 | 1 | 0 | 0 | 3 | 3 | 13 | −10 | 3 | | 0–4 | — | 3–2 | — | — |

Rules for classification: 1) goal difference, 2) goals scored, 3) away goals scored, 4) matches won, 5) away matches won, 6) drawing of lots.

=== Group D ===
| Pos | Team | Pld | W | PW | PL | L | GF | GA | GD | Pts | Qualification | ROS | DND | CLY | AIR | ANN |
|---|---|---|---|---|---|---|---|---|---|---|---|---|---|---|---|---|
| 1 | Ross County | 4 | 3 | 1 | 0 | 0 | 11 | 3 | +8 | 11 | Qualification for the second round | — | p1–1 | 3–1 | — | — |
| 2 | Dundee | 4 | 3 | 0 | 1 | 0 | 14 | 3 | +11 | 10 | Qualification for the second round | — | — | 4–0 | 4–2 | — |
| 3 | Clyde | 4 | 2 | 0 | 0 | 2 | 6 | 8 | −2 | 6 | | — | — | — | 1–0 | 4–1 |
| 4 | Airdrieonians | 4 | 1 | 0 | 0 | 3 | 5 | 8 | −3 | 3 | | 0–3 | — | — | — | 3–0 |
| 5 | Annan Athletic | 4 | 0 | 0 | 0 | 4 | 2 | 16 | −14 | 0 | | 1–4 | 0–5 | — | — | — |

Rules for classification: 1) goal difference, 2) goals scored, 3) away goals scored, 4) matches won, 5) away matches won, 6) drawing of lots.

=== Group E ===
| Pos | Team | Pld | W | PW | PL | L | GF | GA | GD | Pts | Qualification | STE | PAR | LIV | FOR | BRE |
|---|---|---|---|---|---|---|---|---|---|---|---|---|---|---|---|---|
| 1 | Stenhousemuir | 4 | 2 | 2 | 0 | 0 | 6 | 3 | +3 | 10 | Qualification for the second round | — | — | p0–0 | 2–0 | — |
| 2 | Partick Thistle | 4 | 2 | 1 | 1 | 0 | 13 | 3 | +10 | 9 | Qualification for the second round | 2–2p | — | — | — | 6–0 |
| 3 | Livingston | 4 | 2 | 0 | 2 | 0 | 11 | 1 | +10 | 8 | | — | 1–1p | — | 8–0 | — |
| 4 | Forfar Athletic | 4 | 1 | 0 | 0 | 3 | 3 | 15 | −12 | 3 | | — | 0–4 | — | — | 3–1 |
| 5 | Brechin City | 4 | 0 | 0 | 0 | 4 | 2 | 13 | −11 | 0 | | 1–2 | — | 0–2 | — | — |

Rules for classification: 1) goal difference, 2) goals scored, 3) away goals scored, 4) matches won, 5) away matches won, 6) drawing of lots.

=== Group F ===
| Pos | Team | Pld | W | PW | PL | L | GF | GA | GD | Pts | Qualification | ICT | EFI | STJ | LIN | MOR |
|---|---|---|---|---|---|---|---|---|---|---|---|---|---|---|---|---|
| 1 | Inverness Caledonian Thistle | 4 | 3 | 1 | 0 | 0 | 5 | 1 | +4 | 11 | Qualification for the second round | — | p1–1 | 1–0 | — | — |
| 2 | East Fife | 4 | 2 | 1 | 1 | 0 | 7 | 3 | +4 | 9 | | — | — | — | 3–1 | 2–0 |
| 3 | St Johnstone | 4 | 2 | 0 | 1 | 1 | 6 | 2 | +4 | 7 | | — | 1–1p | — | — | 3–0 |
| 4 | Linlithgow Rose | 4 | 1 | 0 | 0 | 3 | 2 | 7 | −5 | 3 | | 0–2 | — | 0–2 | — | — |
| 5 | Greenock Morton | 4 | 0 | 0 | 0 | 4 | 0 | 7 | −7 | 0 | | 0–1 | — | — | 0–1 | — |

Rules for classification: 1) goal difference, 2) goals scored, 3) away goals scored, 4) matches won, 5) away matches won, 6) drawing of lots.

=== Group G ===
| Pos | Team | Pld | W | PW | PL | L | GF | GA | GD | Pts | Qualification | AYR | FAL | EDI | ALL | STR |
|---|---|---|---|---|---|---|---|---|---|---|---|---|---|---|---|---|
| 1 | Ayr United | 4 | 4 | 0 | 0 | 0 | 11 | 3 | +8 | 12 | Qualification for the second round | — | — | 3–0 (Note: Ayr United were awarded a technical 3−0 win over Edinburgh City, who fielded an ineligible player. The match had originally finished 2–0 to Ayr United.) | 4–1 | — |
| 2 | Falkirk | 4 | 2 | 0 | 1 | 1 | 9 | 2 | +7 | 7 | | 0–1 | — | — | — | 3–0 |
| 3 | Edinburgh City | 4 | 2 | 0 | 0 | 2 | 4 | 8 | −4 | 6 | | — | 0–5 | — | 2–0 | — |
| 4 | Alloa Athletic | 4 | 0 | 2 | 0 | 2 | 3 | 8 | −5 | 4 | | — | p1–1 | — | — | p2–2 |
| 5 | Stranraer | 4 | 0 | 0 | 1 | 3 | 4 | 10 | −6 | 1 | | 2–3 | — | 0–2 | — | — |

Rules for classification: 1) goal difference, 2) goals scored, 3) away goals scored, 4) matches won, 5) away matches won, 6) drawing of lots.

=== Group H ===
| Pos | Team | Pld | W | PW | PL | L | GF | GA | GD | Pts | Qualification | KIL | HAM | RAI | PET | ELG |
|---|---|---|---|---|---|---|---|---|---|---|---|---|---|---|---|---|
| 1 | Kilmarnock | 4 | 2 | 1 | 1 | 0 | 2 | 0 | +2 | 9 | Qualification for the second round | — | 1–0 | p0–0 | — | — |
| 2 | Hamilton Academical | 4 | 2 | 1 | 0 | 1 | 7 | 2 | +5 | 8 | | — | — | p1–1 | — | 5–0 |
| 3 | Raith Rovers | 4 | 2 | 0 | 2 | 0 | 5 | 2 | +3 | 8 | | — | — | — | 1–0 | 3–1 |
| 4 | Peterhead | 4 | 1 | 1 | 0 | 2 | 3 | 3 | 0 | 5 | | p0–0 | 0–1 | — | — | — |
| 5 | Elgin City | 4 | 0 | 0 | 0 | 4 | 2 | 12 | −10 | 0 | | 0–1 | — | — | 1–3 | — |

Rules for classification: 1) goal difference, 2) goals scored, 3) away goals scored, 4) matches won, 5) away matches won, 6) drawing of lots.

== Knockout phase ==
=== Second round ===
==== Draw and seeding ====
Celtic, Heart of Midlothian, Rangers, Motherwell and Hibernian entered the competition at this stage, due to their participation in UEFA club competitions. The draw for the second round took place on 26 July 2026 broadcast live on Premier Sports 1 following the St Mirren v Dunfermline Athletic match.

Teams in bold advanced to the quarter-finals.

| Seeded | Unseeded |
|---|---|
| **Aberdeen**; Ayr United†; **Celtic**; **Heart of Midlothian**; **Hibernian**; Motherwell; **Rangers**; **Ross County*** | Dundee; Dundee United; Dunfermline Athletic†; Inverness Caledonian Thistle†; **Kilmarnock**; Partick Thistle†; **Stenhousemuir**†; St Mirren |

Notes

- † denotes teams playing in the Championship.
- * denotes team playing in League One.

==== Matches ====
| 14 August 2026 | **Kilmarnock** | **3–2** | Ayr United | Kilmarnock |
| 19:45 | Hugill 42'; Schjønning-Larsen 79'; Cleșcenco 89' | | Stirton 5'; Taylor 48' | Stadium: Rugby Park; Attendance: 11,365; Referee: Matthew MacDermid |

| 15 August 2026 | Dunfermline Athletic | **1–2** | **Ross County** | Dunfermline |
| 15:00 | Oyirwoth 76' | | Lindsay 58'; Chin 85' | Stadium: East End Park; Attendance: 3,535; Referee: Ryan Lee |

| 15 August 2026 | **Aberdeen** | **3–0** | Dundee | Aberdeen |
| 15:00 | Nisbet 51', 63'; Ntelo 57' | | | Stadium: Pittodrie Stadium; Attendance: 10,018; Referee: Nick Walsh |

| 15 August 2026 | Dundee United | **0–4** | **Celtic** | Dundee |
| 17:45 | | | Trusty 22'; Durán 24'; Tounekti 54'; Nygren 63' | Stadium: Tannadice Park; Attendance: 9,136; Referee: Steven McLean |

| 16 August 2026 | **Hibernian** | **1–0** | Partick Thistle | Edinburgh |
| 14:00 | Elding 12' | | | Stadium: Easter Road; Attendance: 10,608; Referee: Duncan Nicolson |

| 16 August 2026 | **Heart of Midlothian** | **6–2** | Inverness Caledonian Thistle | Edinburgh |
| 14:00 | Borchgrevink 16'; Mato 59'; Miller 82' (pen.), 90+4'; Wilson 84'; Braga 90+1' | | Duncan 54'; Bavidge 56' | Stadium: Tynecastle Park; Attendance: 15,327; Referee: Calum Scott |

| 16 August 2026 | **Stenhousemuir** | **1–0** (a.e.t.) | Motherwell | Stenhousemuir |
| 14:00 | O'Reilly 114' | | | Stadium: Ochilview Park; Attendance: 1,943; Referee: Colin Steven |

| 16 August 2026 | **Rangers** | **5–1** | St Mirren | Glasgow |
| 16:00 | Naderi 9'; Dragojević 18'; Gassama 52'; Penrice 54'; McCausland 74' | | Mochrie 30' | Stadium: Ibrox Stadium; Attendance: 34,387; Referee: John Beaton |

=== Quarter-finals ===
==== Draw and seeding ====
The draw for the quarter-finals took place on 16 August 2026 broadcast live on Premier Sports 1 following the Rangers v St Mirren match.

Teams in bold advanced to the semi-finals.

| Premiership | Championship | League One |
|---|---|---|
| **Aberdeen**; Celtic; **Heart of Midlothian**; **Hibernian**; Kilmarnock; **Rangers** | Stenhousemuir | Ross County |

==== Matches ====
| 11 September 2026 | Stenhousemuir | **0–3** | **Heart of Midlothian** | Stenhousemuir |
| 19:45 | | | Williams 35'; Mato 39'; Dhanda 74' | Stadium: Ochilview Park; Attendance: 2,306; Referee: Calum Scott |

| 12 September 2026 | Ross County | **0–3** | **Hibernian** | Dingwall |
| 15:00 | | | Klidjé 7'; Mayor 14' (pen.); Šuto 39' | Stadium: Victoria Park; Attendance: 4,003; Referee: Matthew MacDermid |

| 12 September 2026 | Kilmarnock | **1–1** (a.e.t.) (**1–3** p) | **Aberdeen** | Kilmarnock |
| 17:45 | John-Jules 58' | | Nisbet 52' | Stadium: Rugby Park; Attendance: 6,401; Referee: Don Robertson |
| | **Penalties** |
| | Hugill (penalty scored); John-Jules (penalty missed); O'Hara (penalty missed); Tshibola (penalty missed) | | (penalty missed) Guinness-Walker; (penalty scored) Briedl; (penalty scored) Mouloua; (penalty scored) Milne |

| 13 September 2026 | **Rangers** | **3–0** | Celtic | Glasgow |
| 12:00 | Neil 23', 75'; Kelsy 59' | | | Stadium: Ibrox Stadium; Attendance: 51,212; Referee: Nick Walsh |

=== Semi-finals ===
==== Draw and seeding ====
The draw for the semi-finals took place on 13 September 2026 broadcast live on Premier Sports 1 following the Rangers v Celtic match.

Teams in bold advanced to the final.

- Aberdeen
- Heart of Midlothian
- **Hibernian**
- **Rangers**

==== Matches ====
| 31 October 2026 | **Rangers** | **1–0** | Aberdeen | Glasgow |
| 17:30 | Naderi 83' | | | Stadium: Hampden Park; Attendance: 43,567; Referee: Ryan Lee |

| 1 November 2026 | Heart of Midlothian | **1–2** | **Hibernian** | Glasgow |
| 15:00 | Braga 4' | | Boyle 19'; McGrath 42' | Stadium: Hampden Park; Attendance: 41,673; Referee: David Dickinson |

=== Final ===
| 13 December 2026 | **Hibernian** | **v** | **Rangers** | Glasgow |
| 15:00 | | | | Stadium: Hampden Park |

== Media coverage ==
The domestic broadcasting rights for the competition are held exclusively by Premier Sports, who broadcast between 12 and 16 live matches per season, as well as highlights.

The following matches will be broadcast live:

| Round | Date | Match |
|---|---|---|
| Group stage | 11 July 2026 (Matchday 1) | Dumbarton v St Mirren (streamed); Dundee v Airdrieonians (streamed); East Kilbride v Dunfermline Athletic (streamed); Edinburgh City v Falkirk (streamed); Stirling Albion v Dundee United |
| Group stage | 14 July 2026 (Matchday 2) | Annan Athletic v Dundee; Brora Rangers v Aberdeen; Falkirk v Ayr United; Kilmarnock v Raith Rovers; Linlithgow Rose v St Johnstone; Montrose v Dundee United (all streamed) |
| Group stage | 18 July 2026 (Matchday 3) | Cove Rangers v St Mirren (streamed); Elgin City v Kilmarnock (streamed); Livingston v Partick Thistle (streamed); St Johnstone v Greenock Morton (streamed); Aberdeen v Queen's Park; Dundee United v Arbroath |
| Group stage | 21 July 2026; 22 July 2026 (Matchday 4) | Alloa Athletic v Falkirk (streamed); Dundee United v The Spartans (streamed); Inverness Caledonian Thistle v St Johnstone (streamed); Kilmarnock v Hamilton Academical (streamed); Ross County v Dundee (streamed); St Mirren v East Kilbride (streamed); Queen of the South v Aberdeen (streamed matches 21 July 2026, Queen of the South v Aberdeen 22 July 2026) |
| Group stage | 25 July 2026; 26 July 2026 (Matchday 5) | Aberdeen v Kelty Hearts (streamed); Dundee v Clyde (streamed); Falkirk v Stranraer (streamed); Peterhead v Kilmarnock (streamed); St Johnstone v East Fife (streamed); St Mirren v Dunfermline Athletic (streamed matches 25 July 2026, St Mirren v Dunfermline Athletic 26 July 2026) |
| Second round | 14 August 2026 | Kilmarnock v Ayr United |
| Second round | 15 August 2026 | Aberdeen v Dundee (streamed); Dunfermline Athletic v Ross County (streamed); Dundee United v Celtic |
| Second round | 16 August 2026 | Heart of Midlothian v Inverness Caledonian Thistle (streamed); Hibernian v Partick Thistle (streamed); Stenhousemuir v Motherwell (streamed); Rangers v St Mirren |
| Quarter-finals | 11 September 2026 | Stenhousemuir v Heart of Midlothian |
| Quarter-finals | 12 September 2026 | Ross County v Hibernian (streamed); Kilmarnock v Aberdeen |
| Quarter-finals | 13 September 2026 | Rangers v Celtic |
| Semi-finals | 31 October 2026 | Rangers v Aberdeen |
| Semi-finals | 1 November 2026 | Heart of Midlothian v Hibernian |
| Final | 13 December 2026 | Hibernian v Rangers |
