= Gavin Molloy =

Irish association football player

Personal information
- Date of birth: 19 October 2001 (age 25)
- Position: Defender

Team information
- Current team: Aberdeen
- Number: 21

Youth career
- 2017–2018: Drogheda United
- 2018–2020: Bohemians

Senior career*
Years	Team	Apps	(Gls)
2021–2024	Shelbourne	71	(4)
2024–	Aberdeen	46	(1)
- * Club domestic league appearances and goals as of 08:47, 22 November 2026 (UTC)

Gavin Molloy (born 19 October 2001) is an Irish professional footballer who plays for Scottish Premiership club Aberdeen, as a defender.

== Career ==
Molloy spent his early career with Drogheda United, Bohemians and Shelbourne, and eventually became the captain of the latter team in March 2023. He signed a new contract with Shelbourne in July 2022, in April 2023, and again in February 2024. With Shelbourne he was a runner-up in the 2022 FAI Cup final.

On 14 June 2024, it was announced that Molloy would sign a three-year contract with Scottish side Aberdeen on 1 July, joining the club for an undisclosed fee, reported to be worth £75,000. After Molloy's departure, Shelbourne won the league on the final day of the season.

== Personal life ==
His grandfather, Theo Dunne, was also a footballer and similarly captained Shelbourne. His second cousin, Richard Dunne, was also a footballer.

== Career statistics ==
As of match played 21 November 2026

Appearances and goals by club, season and competition
Club	Season	League			National cup (Note: Includes FAI Cup)		League cup (Note: Includes Scottish League Cup)		Other		Total	
Club	Season	Division	Apps	Goals	Apps	Goals	Apps	Goals	Apps	Goals	Apps	Goals
Shelbourne	2021	League of Ireland First Division	3	0	0	0	–		–		3	0
Shelbourne	2022	League of Ireland Premier Division	19	2	4	1	–		–		23	3
Shelbourne	2023	League of Ireland Premier Division	27	1	1	0	–		1 (Note: Appearance in Leinster Senior Cup)	0	29	1
Shelbourne	2024	League of Ireland Premier Division	22	1	0	0	–		–		22	1
Shelbourne	Total		71	4	4	1	0	0	1	0	76	5
Aberdeen	2024–25	Scottish Premiership	19	0	0	0	7	0	–		26	0
Aberdeen	2025–26	Scottish Premiership	18	0	1	0	1	0	1 (Note: Appearance in UEFA Europa League)	0	21	0
Aberdeen	2026–27	Scottish Premiership	9	1	0	0	5	0	–		14	1
Aberdeen	Total		46	1	1	0	13	0	1	0	61	1
Career total			117	5	6	1	13	0	2	0	138	6
