= Kjartan Már Kjartansson =

Icelandic footballer (born 2006

Personal information
- Date of birth: 14 July 2006 (age 20)
- Place of birth: Iceland
- Position: Midfielder

Team information
- Current team: Brann
- Number: 7

Youth career
- Stjarnan

Senior career*
Years	Team	Apps	(Gls)
2022–2025	Stjarnan	49	(1)
2025–2026	Aberdeen	8	(0)
2026–	Brann	3	(0)

International career^{‡}
2022	Iceland U16	3	(0)
2022–2023	Iceland U17	8	(2)
2023–2025	Iceland U19	9	(0)
2025–	Iceland U21	6	(0)
- * Club domestic league appearances and goals as of 20 September 2026 ‡ National team caps and goals as of 31 March 2026

Kjartan Már Kjartansson (born 14 July 2006) is an Icelandic professional footballer who plays as a midfielder for SK Brann.

== Club career ==
As a youth player, Kjartansson joined the youth academy of Icelandic side Stjarnan and was promoted to the club's senior team in 2022, where he made forty-seven league appearances and scored one goal. Scottish newspaper Daily Record wrote in 2025 that he was "rated as in the top 15 midfielders under the age of 18 in world football" while playing for the club. Kjartansson plays as a midfielder and is known for his versatility. While playing for Icelandic side Stjarnan, he played as a winger during the 2023 season.

Ahead of the 2025–26 season, he signed for Scottish side Aberdeen.

== International career ==
Kjartansson is an Iceland youth international. During October 2022 and March 2023, he played for the Iceland national under-17 football team for 2023 UEFA European Under-17 Championship qualification.

== Career statistics ==
=== Club ===
As of match played 20 September 2026

Appearances and goals by club, season and competition
Club	Season	League			Cup		League Cup		Europe		Total	
Club	Season	Division	Apps	Goals	Apps	Goals	Apps	Goals	Apps	Goals	Apps	Goals
Stjarnan	2022	Besta deild karla	6	0	—		—		—		6	0
Stjarnan	2023	Besta deild karla	17	1	2	0	2	0	—		21	1
Stjarnan	2024	Besta deild karla	17	0	1	0	1	0	4 (Note: Appearances in UEFA Conference League)	0	23	0
Stjarnan	2025	Besta deild karla	9	0	1	0	2	0	—		12	0
Stjarnan	Total		49	1	4	0	5	0	4	0	62	1
Aberdeen	2025–26	Scottish Premiership	7	0	—		—		—		7	0
Aberdeen	2026–27	Scottish Premiership	0	0	—		2	1	—		2	1
Aberdeen	Total		7	0	—		2	1	—		9	1
Brann	2026	Eliteserien	3	0	1	0	—		1	0	5	0
Career total			59	1	5	0	7	1	5	0	76	2
