= 2026 Scottish League Cup final =

Football games

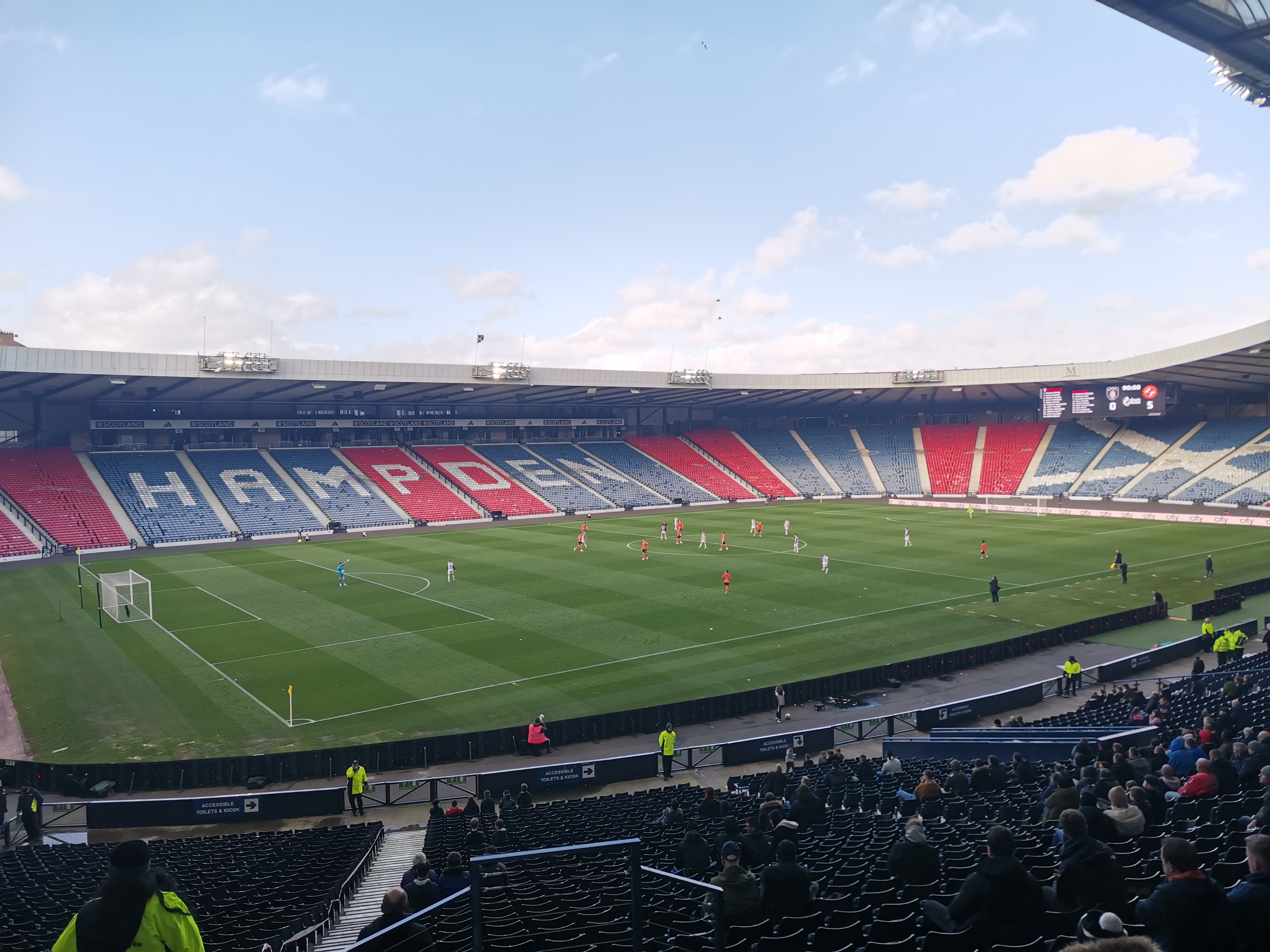
- Hampden Park, venue for the match
- Event: 2026–27 Scottish League Cup
Hibernian	Rangers
- Date: 13 December 2026
- Venue: Hampden Park, Glasgow

The 2026 Scottish League Cup final will be an association football match that takes place at Hampden Park, Glasgow on 13 December 2026. It will be the culmination of the 2026–27 Scottish League Cup, the 81st season of the Scottish League Cup (known as the Premier Sports Cup for sponsorship reasons), a competition for the 42 teams in the Scottish Professional Football League (SPFL). It will be played between Scottish Premiership clubs Hibernian and Rangers (record 28-time winners).

== Match ==
=== Details ===
13 December 2026
15:00

Hibernian	v	Rangers

Hampden Park, Glasgow
