= Riverstown =

Village in County Sligo, Ireland

Riverstown Irish: Baile idir dhá Abhainn
- Village
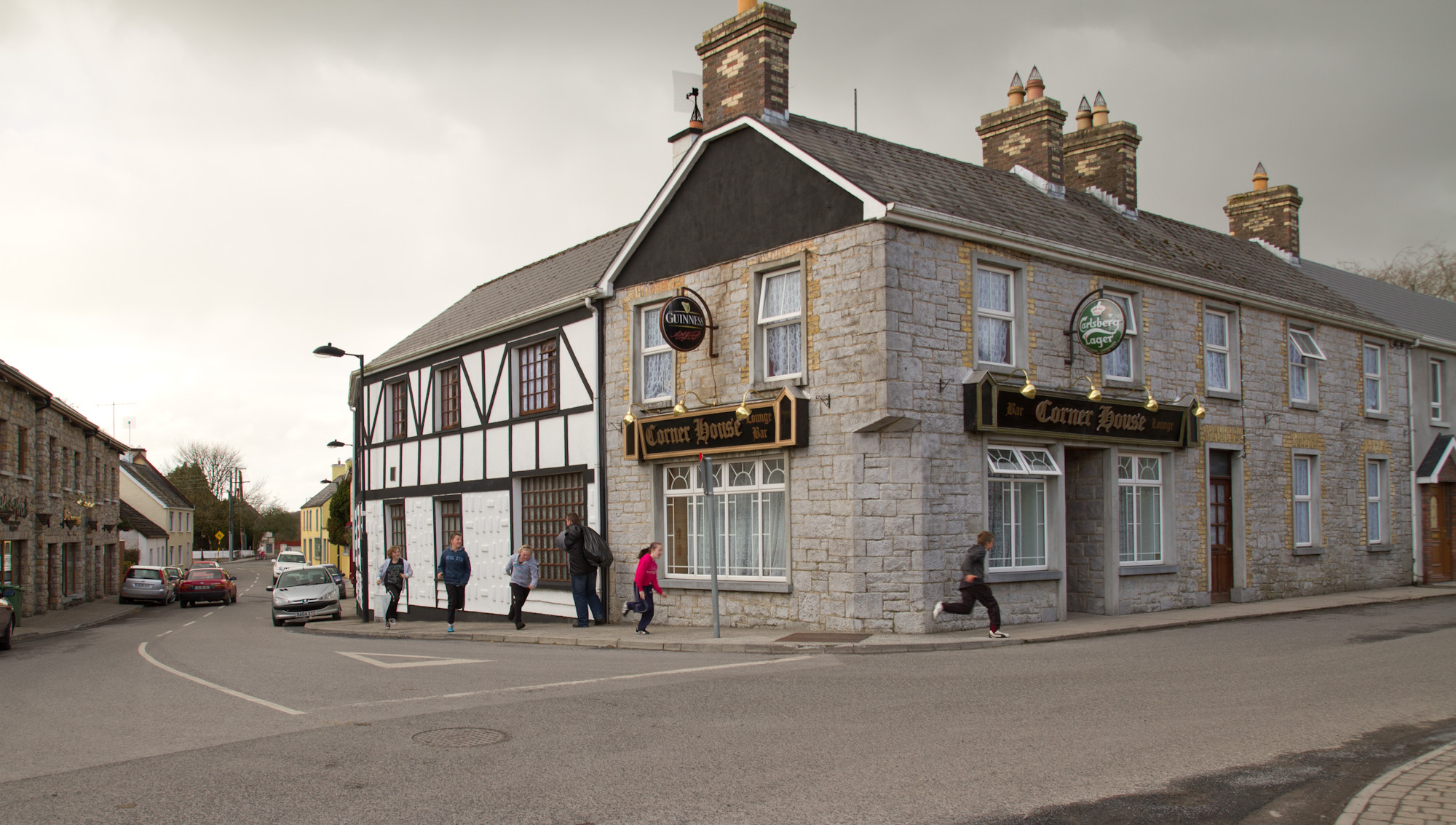
- Street corner in Riverstown

- Location in Ireland
- Coordinates: 54°07′54″N 8°23′40″W
- Country: Ireland
- Province: Connacht
- County: County Sligo
- Elevation: 74 m (243 ft)

Population (2022)
  - Total: 394
- Irish Grid Reference: G742203

Riverstown, historically called Ballyederdaowen (Irish: Baile idir dhá Abhainn, meaning 'town between two rivers'), is a village in County Sligo, Ireland. Known for its musical tradition it is located at a bridging point of the River Unshin (Arrow), 17 kilometres (11 mi) south of Sligo town and 4 km (by road) east of the N4 road.

== Amenities ==
Amenities and notable buildings in the area include the post office, Coopershill House and the Garda barracks (built c. 1890). There are also a number of pubs and shops.

The local Church of Ireland church, Tawnagh parish church, dates to c. 1817. The Roman Catholic church in Riverstown, the Church of the Sacred Heart, was built in 1940.

== Culture and community ==
Each year the village hosts the Riverstown Vintage Festival on the June Bank Holiday Weekend, and the James Morrison Traditional Music Festival during the August Bank Holiday Weekend.

During the 1990s, Riverstown and the Brookeborough Community Development Association launched the 'Riverbrooke Cross-Border Initiative' linking the two villages in a programme of cross-community/cross-border working.

== Folk park ==
Sligo Folk Park, situated at the east end of the town, was created as the result of a community effort in the 1990s.

== People ==
- El Marqués de Osorno, Viceroy of Peru, was a Spanish military officer and colonial administrator in Chile and Peru from 1788 to 1801. He was born Ambrose O'Higgins at Ballynary, about halfway between Riverstown and Ballinafad.
- Michael Bowles (1909–1998), conductor and composer, born in Riverstown.
- Owen Elding, association footballer
- Johnny Kenny, association footballer
- James Morrison (1893–1947), South Sligo-style fiddler was born in the townland of Drumfin close to Riverstown.

== Gallery ==
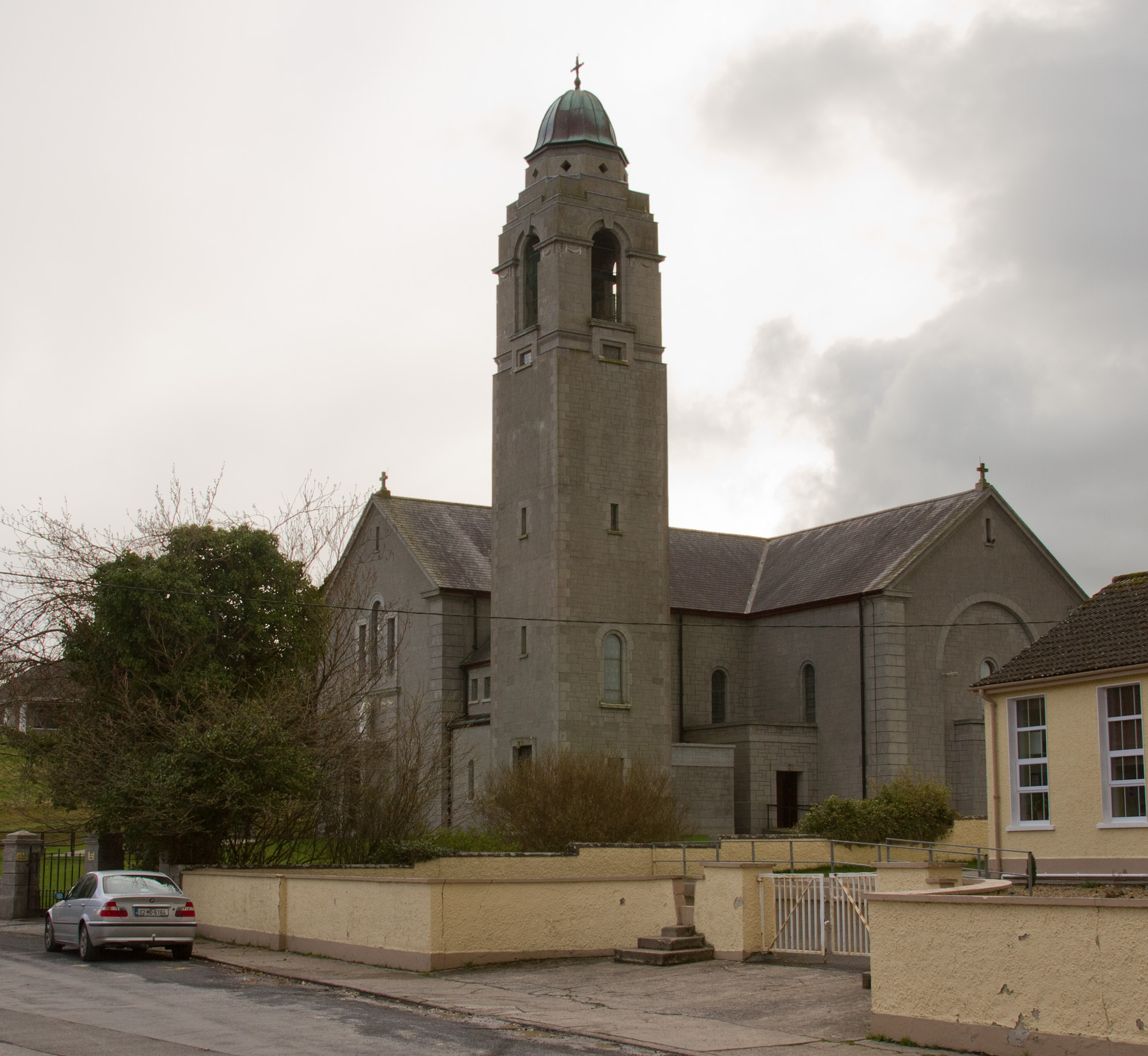
Riverstown Catholic church

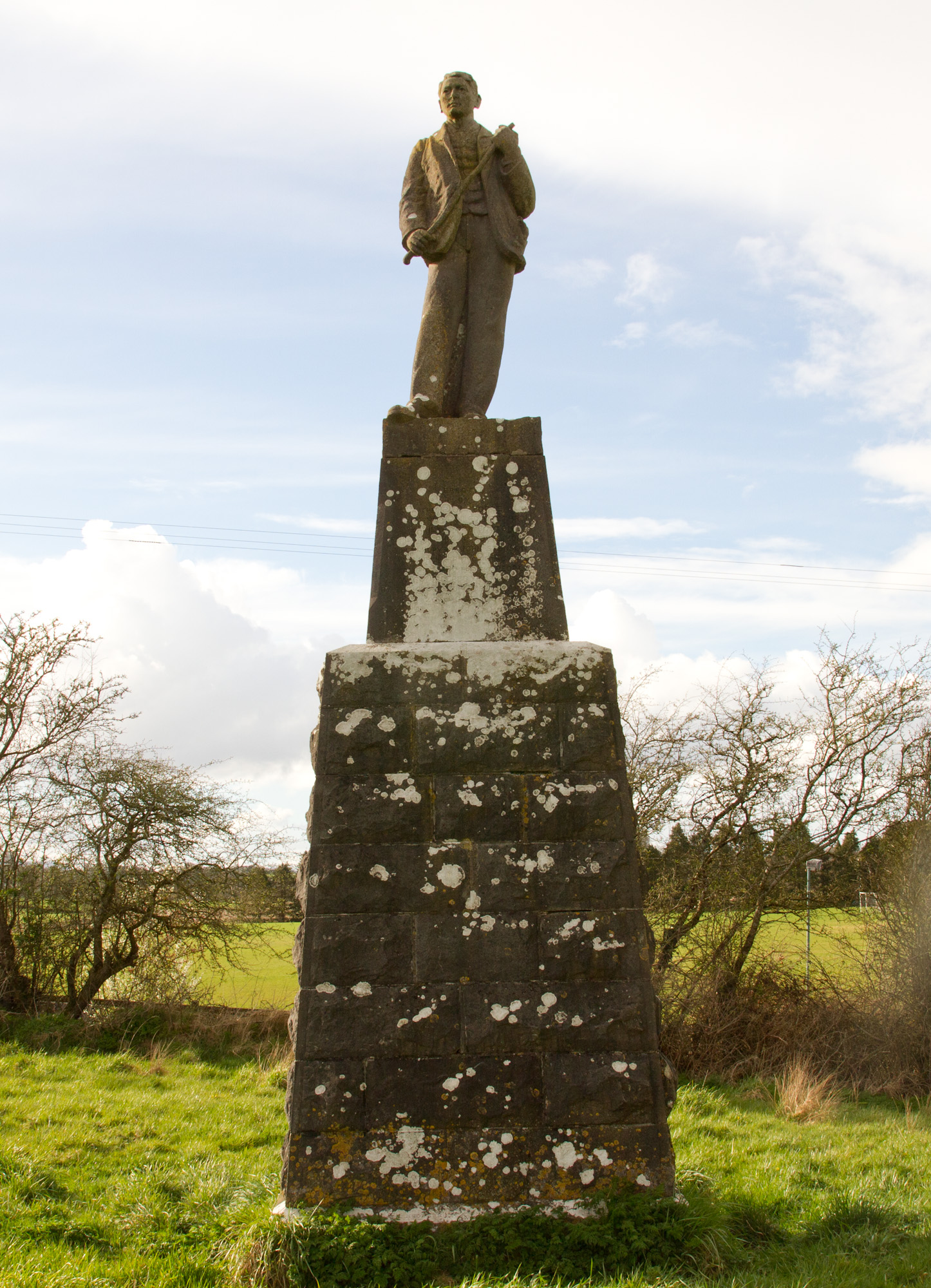
John Stenson memorial in Riverstown

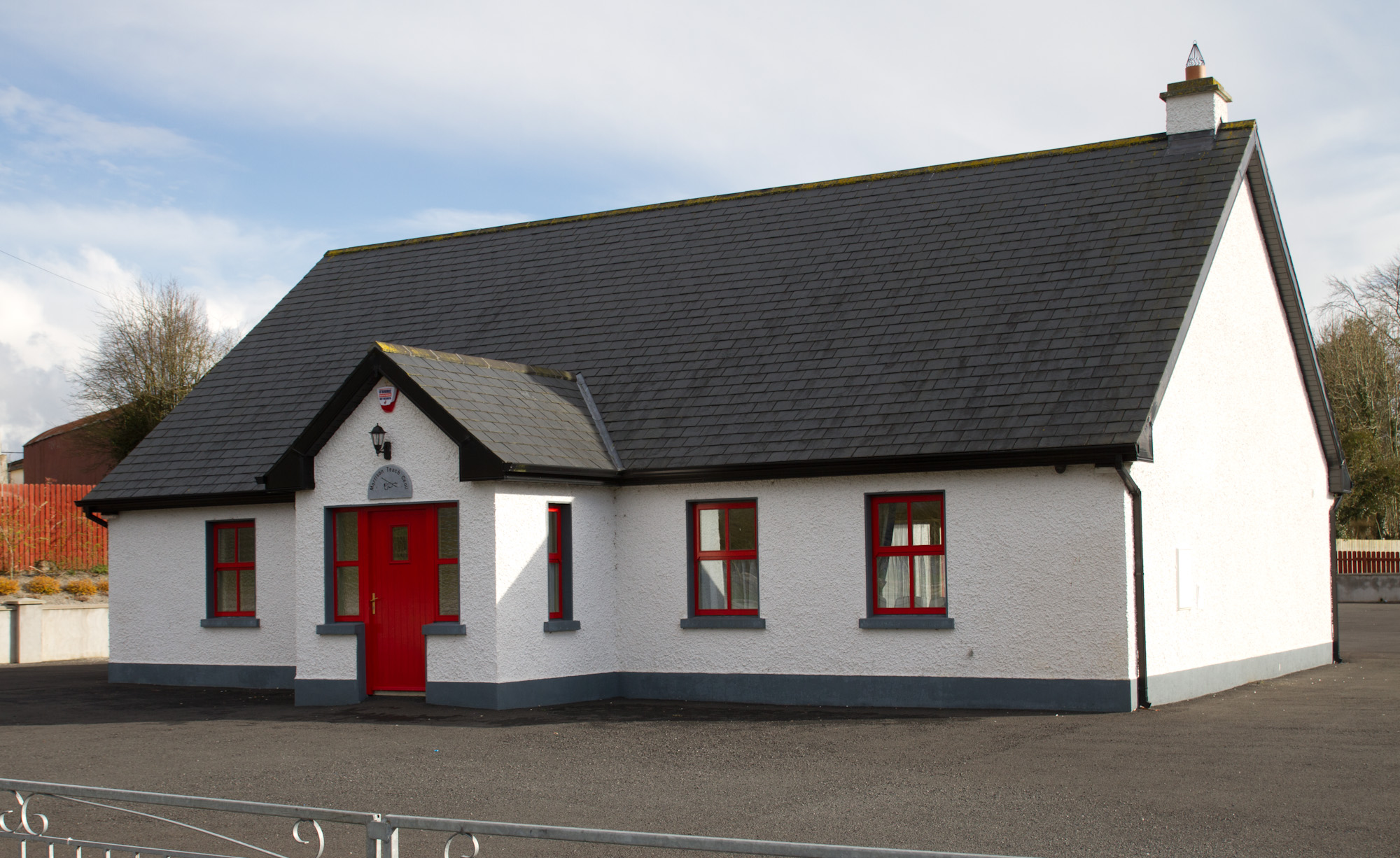
The James Morrison Teach Cheoil or the Morrison Cottage

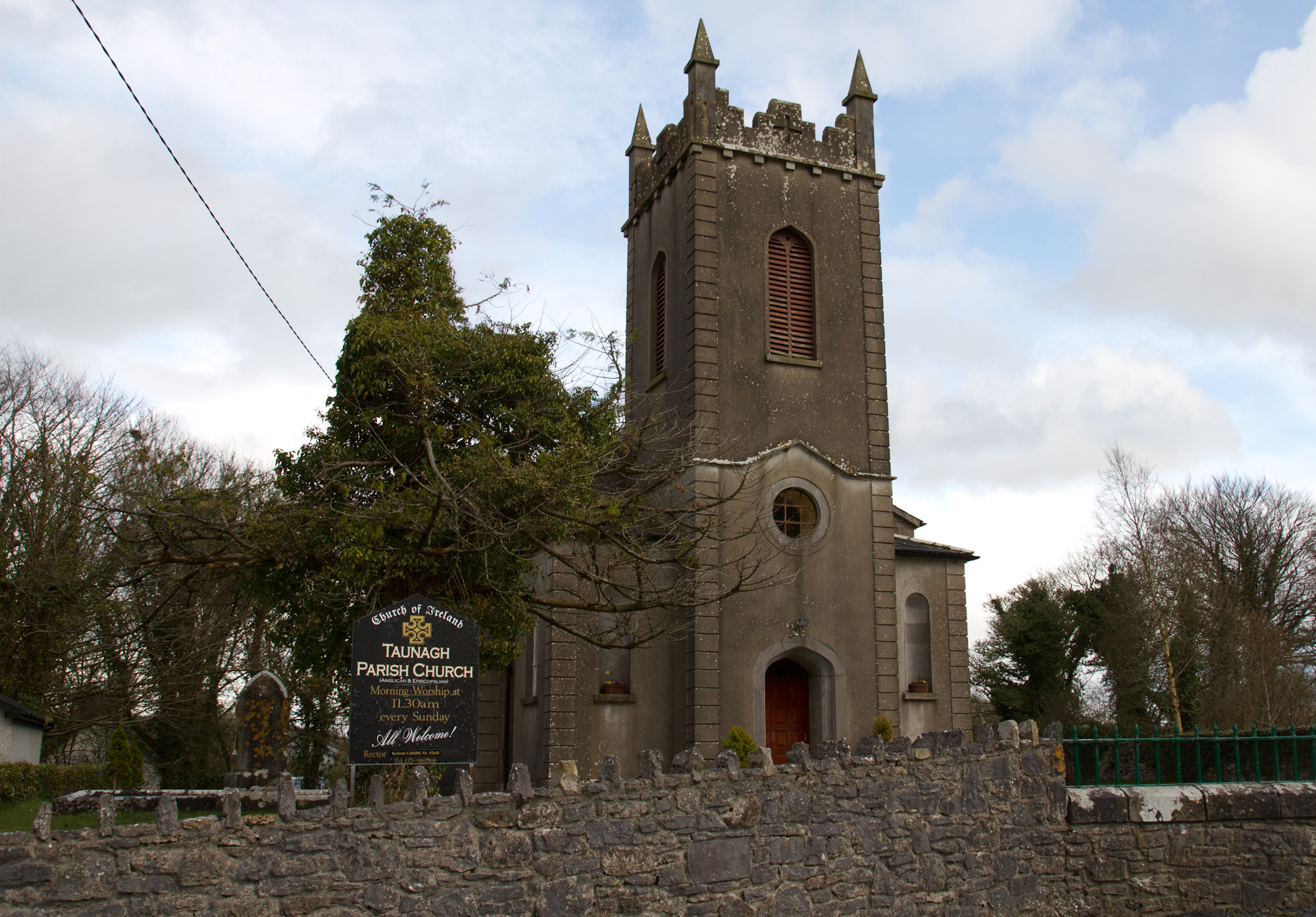
Riverstown Church of Ireland

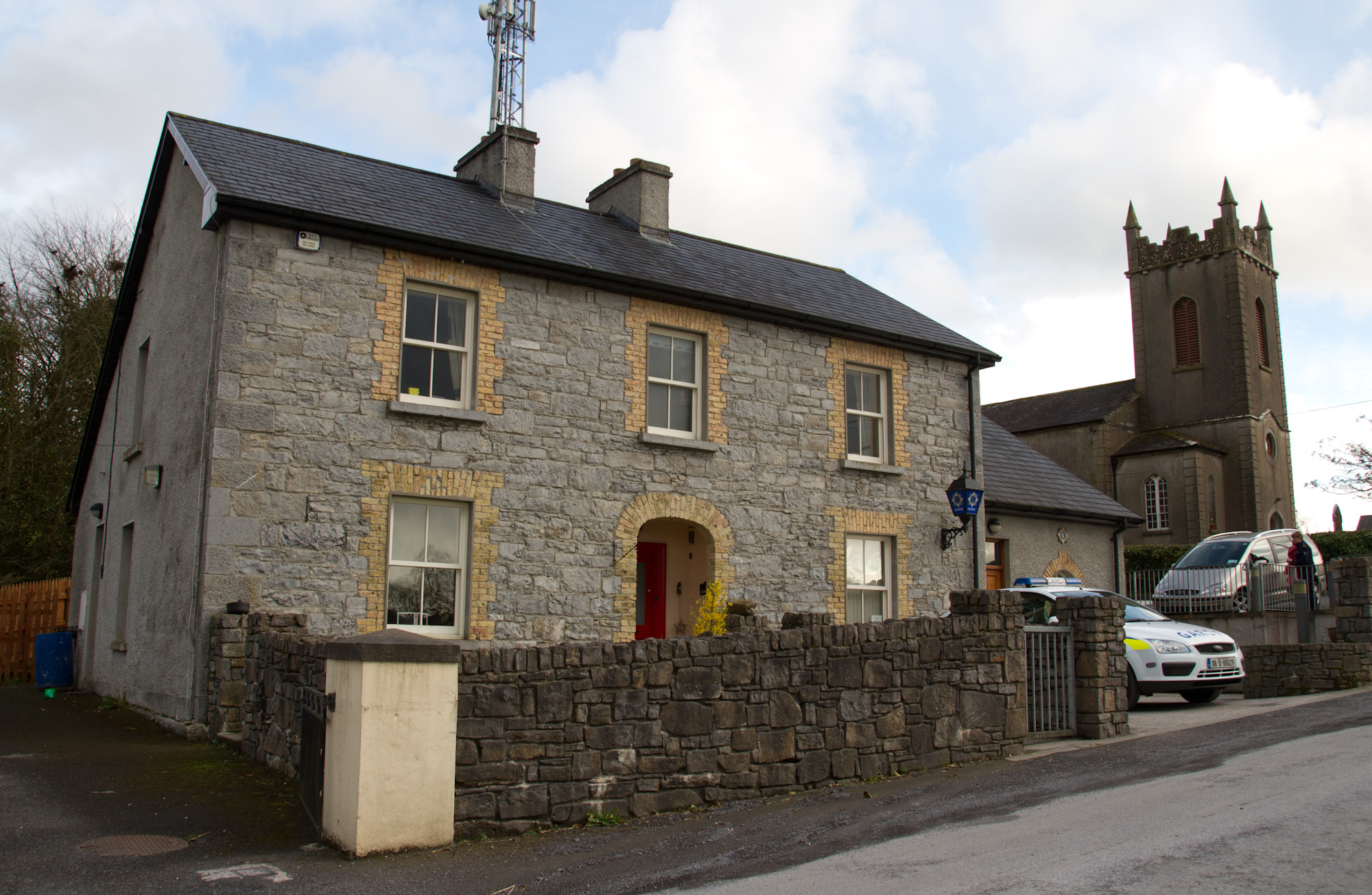
Riverstown Garda station

== See also ==
- List of towns and villages in Ireland
