= Brad Lyons =

Northern Irish footballer

Personal information
- Full name: Brad Joseph Lyons
- Date of birth: 26 May 1997 (age 29)
- Height: 1.83 m (6 ft 0 in)
- Position: Midfielder

Team information
- Current team: Aberdeen
- Number: 8

Senior career*
Years	Team	Apps	(Gls)
2014–2019	Coleraine	94	(17)
2018–2019	→ Blackburn Rovers (loan)	0	(0)
2019–2021	Blackburn Rovers	0	(0)
2019	→ St Mirren (loan)	15	(1)
2021	→ Morecambe (loan)	14	(1)
2021–2026	Kilmarnock	122	(5)
2026–	Aberdeen	6	(2)

International career^{‡}
2023–	Northern Ireland	8	(0)
- * Club domestic league appearances and goals as of 08:46, 22 November 2026 (UTC) ‡ National team caps and goals as of 18:33, 16 October 2026 (UTC)

Brad Joseph Lyons (born 26 May 1997) is a Northern Irish professional footballer who plays as a midfielder for club Aberdeen and the Northern Ireland national team.

== Club career ==
Lyons began his career in the Irish Premiership with Coleraine. After helping Coleraine win the Irish Cup, in September 2018 he moved on loan to English club Blackburn Rovers, with the deal to become permanent in January 2019. In January 2019 he signed a permanent 18-month contract, his first ever professional contract. He stated that he wanted to break into the Blackburn first-team. Later that month he moved on loan to St Mirren. He was sent off 28 minutes into his debut, in the Scottish Cup, on 19 January 2019. He was offered a new contract by Blackburn at the end of the 2019–20 season.

In December 2020 he appeared in a Blackburn Rovers' first-team match day squad for the first time since he signed for the club. He moved on loan to Morecambe in January 2021.

On 14 May 2021 it was announced that he would leave Blackburn at the end of the season, following the expiry of his contract.

On 17 June 2021, it was announced that Lyons would join Scottish Championship side Kilmarnock on a two-year deal following the expiry of his Blackburn contract. On 7 June 2023, he signed a new two-year contract, and on 5 April 2024 signed a further new contract to keep him at the club until 2026.

On 28 May 2026, Lyons agreed to join Scottish Premiership club Aberdeen on a two-year deal from 1 July.

== International career ==
In August 2023, Lyons received his first call-up to the Northern Ireland senior national team by head coach Michael O'Neill, for two UEFA Euro 2024 qualifying matches against Slovenia and Kazakhstan. He made his debut on 17 October 2023.

== Career statistics ==
=== Club ===
As of match played 21 November 2026

Appearances and goals by club, season and competition
Club	Season	League			National cup (Note: Includes Irish Cup, FA Cup, Scottish Cup)		League cup (Note: Includes NIFL Cup, EFL Cup, Scottish League Cup)		Continental		Other		Total	
Club	Season	Division	Apps	Goals	Apps	Goals	Apps	Goals	Apps	Goals	Apps	Goals	Apps	Goals
Coleraine	2014–15	NIFL Premiership	11	2	0	0	0	0	—		—		11	2
Coleraine	2015–16	NIFL Premiership	30	4	1	0	3	0	—		0	0	34	4
Coleraine	2016–17	NIFL Premiership	24	5	4	1	3	1	—		—		31	7
Coleraine	2017–18	NIFL Premiership	26	4	3	0	0	0	2 (Note: Appearance(s) in UEFA Europa League)	0	1 (Note: Appearance(s) in NIFL Charity Shield)	0	32	4
Coleraine	2018–19	NIFL Premiership	3	2	0	0	0	0	2	0	0	0	5	2
Coleraine	Total		94	17	8	1	6	1	4	0	1	0	113	19
Blackburn Rovers (loan)	2018–19	Championship	0	0	0	0	0	0	—		—		0	0
Blackburn Rovers	2018–19	Championship	0	0	0	0	0	0	—		—		0	0
Blackburn Rovers	2019–20	Championship	0	0	0	0	0	0	—		—		0	0
Blackburn Rovers	2020–21	Championship	0	0	0	0	0	0	—		—		0	0
Blackburn Rovers	Total		0	0	0	0	0	0	0	0	0	0	0	0
St Mirren (loan)	2018–19	Scottish Premiership	15	1	2	0	0	0	—		0	0	17	1
Morecambe (loan)	2020–21	League Two	14	1	1	0	0	0	—		3 (Note: Appearance(s) in EFL League Two play-offs)	0	18	1
Kilmarnock	2021–22	Scottish Championship	19	0	1	0	5	0	—		3 (Note: Appearance(s) in Scottish Challenge Cup)	0	28	0
Kilmarnock	2022–23	Scottish Premiership	19	1	1	0	4	0	—		—		24	1
Kilmarnock	2023–24	Scottish Premiership	23	2	0	0	6	1	—		—		29	3
Kilmarnock	2024–25	Scottish Premiership	30	1	1	0	1	0	6 (Note: Two appearances in UEFA Europa League, Four appearances in UEFA Europa Conference League)	0	—		39	1
Kilmarnock	2025–26	Scottish Premiership	31	1	1	0	4	1	—		—		36	1
Kilmarnock	Total		122	5	4	0	20	2	6	0	3	0	156	7
Kilmarnock B	2022–23	—			—		—		—		2	0	2	0
Aberdeen	2026–27	Scottish Premiership	6	2	0	0	5	1	—		0	0	11	3
Career total			252	26	15	1	31	4	10	0	9	0	317	31

=== International ===
As of match played 31 March 2026

Appearances and goals by national team and year
National team	Year	Apps	Goals
Northern Ireland	2023	1	0
Northern Ireland	2024	2	0
Northern Ireland	2025	4	0
Northern Ireland	2026	1	0
Total		8	0

== Honours ==
Morecambe

- EFL League Two play-offs: 2021

Kilmarnock

- Scottish Championship: 2021–22
