= Findlay Marshall =

Scottish footballer

Personal information
- Full name: Findlay Marshall
- Date of birth: 17 April 2006 (age 20)
- Place of birth: Stonehaven, Scotland
- Position: Midfielder

Team information
- Current team: Aberdeen

Youth career
- -2017: Dyce Boys Club
- 2017-2024: Aberdeen

Senior career*
Years	Team	Apps	(Gls)
2024-	Aberdeen	0	(0)
2024	→ Edinburgh City (loan)	15	(3)
2024-2025	→ Cove Rangers (loan)	31	(8)
2025-2026	→ Arbroath (loan)	36	(12)

International career
2023	Scotland U17	1	(0)
- * Club domestic league appearances and goals as of 4 May 2026

Findlay Marshall (Born 17 April 2006) is a Scottish footballer who currently plays as a midfielder for Scottish Premiership side Aberdeen.

== Club career ==
=== Aberdeen ===
Marshall started his career with the youth team Dyce Boys Club, before joining Aberdeen's academy. On 20 September 2023, Findlay signed his First Professional Contract with the club on a 3 year deal, that would see him at the club until 2026. Marshall was told at the beginning of the 2025-26 season he was free to leave the club, but has since moved on loan to Arbroath.

=== Edinburgh City ===
At the Beginning of the January Transfer Window in the 2023-2024 season, Marshall joined Scottish League one side Edinburgh City on loan until the end of season.

=== Cove Rangers ===
Marshall moved to Scottish league one side Cove Rangers at the start of the 2024-2025 season on loan until the end of the season. Marshall featured in the SPFL Team of the week for week 28 after a 3-1 victory over Alloa Athletic in which he scored 2 Goals. He also appeared in SPFL Team of the week for week 38 after a 4-2 victory over Annan Athletic with Marshall providing a goal and an assist.

=== Arbroath ===
At the start of the 2025-2026 season Marshall moved to Scottish Championship side Arbroath on a season long loan. Marshall helped guide Arbroath to a Scottish Premiership Promotion Playoffs and Nominated for PFA Scotland SPFL Young Player of the year.

== International career ==
Marshall was called up to the Scotland Under-17 team in 2023 for their UEFA Under-17 Euro campaign. Marshall came off the bench in the 84th Minute against France Under-17, a game Scotland lost 3-1. Marshall was also an unused substitute for the games against Germany and Portugal.

== Career statistics ==
Club	Season	League			National cup		League cup		Other		Total	
Club	Season	Division	Apps	Goals	Apps	Goals	Apps	Goals	Apps	Goals	Apps	Goals
Edinburgh City	2023-24	Scottish League one	15	3	0	0	0	0	2	1	15	3
Edinburgh City	Total		15	3	0	0	0	0	2	1	17	4
Cove Rangers	2024-25	Scottish League one	31	8	3	0	0	0	4	0	38	8
Cove Rangers	Total		31	8	3	0	0	0	4	0	38	8
Arbroath	2025-26	Scottish Championship	36	12	2	1	4	0	2	2	44	15
Arbroath	Total		36	12	2	1	4	0	2	2	44	15
Career total			82	23	5	1	4	0	8	3	99	27
