= Ayoub Mouloua =

Moroccan footballer (born 2002)

Personal information
- Date of birth: 30 September 2002 (age 24)
- Place of birth: Rabat, Morocco
- Height: 1.83 m (6 ft 0 in)
- Position: Forward

Team information
- Current team: Aberdeen
- Number: 9

Youth career
- FUS

Senior career*
Years	Team	Apps	(Gls)
2021–2026	FUS	50	(17)
2026–	Aberdeen	3	(2)

International career^{‡}
- Morocco U20
2025	Morocco A'	2	(0)
- * Club domestic league appearances and goals as of 30 May 2026 ‡ National team caps and goals as of 10 August 2025

Ayoub Mouloua (Arabic: أيوب مولوع; born 30 September 2002) is a Moroccan professional footballer who plays as a forward for Aberdeen.

== Early life ==
Mouloua was born on 30 September 2002. Born in Morocco, he is a native of Oujda, Morocco.

== Club career ==
As a youth player, Mouloua joined the youth academy of Moroccan side FUS and was promoted to the club's senior team in 2021, where he made fifty league appearances and scored seventeen goals. Following his stint there, he signed for Scottish side Aberdeen ahead of the 2026–27 season.

== International career ==
Mouloua is a Morocco A' international. During the summer of 2025, he played for the Morocco A' national football team at the 2024 African Nations Championship.
