= Owen Elding =

Irish footballer (born 2006)

Personal information
- Date of birth: 7 March 2006 (age 20)
- Place of birth: Boston, Lincolnshire, England
- Height: 1.87 m (6 ft 2 in)
- Position: Forward

Team information
- Current team: Hibernian
- Number: 7

Youth career
- 2014: Ballinamallard United
- 2015: Arrow Harps
- 2015: Manulla
- 2016–2018: Arrow Harps
- 2019–2020: Sligo Rovers
- 2021–2023: Longford Town
- 2023: Sligo Rovers

Senior career*
Years	Team	Apps	(Gls)
2023–2026	Sligo Rovers	62	(12)
2026–	Hibernian	22	(5)

International career^{‡}
2026–	Republic of Ireland U21	2	(0)
2026–	Republic of Ireland	1	(0)
- * Club domestic league appearances and goals as of 22:35, 9 November 2026 (UTC) ‡ National team caps and goals as of 00:00, 18 November 2026 (UTC)

Owen Elding (born 7 March 2006) is a professional footballer who plays as a forward for Scottish Premiership club Hibernian. Born in England, he represents the Republic of Ireland national team.

== Early life ==
Elding was born in Boston in England and also lived in Stockport when his father played there, before moving to Riverstown, County Sligo when his father Anthony signed for Sligo Rovers in 2013. Elding attended Ardkeeran Primary School with fellow Sligo teammate, Johnny Kenny, where he also played Gaelic football. He began playing association football with Ballinamallard United. He later played for Arrow Harps in Riverstown, before switching to Manulla F.C., where he performed well enough to be called up to the Mayo League representative side. After returning to Arrow Harps, Elding featured for the Sligo/Leitrim League representative side.

== Career ==
=== Youth career ===
Elding's performances earned him a successful trial with the Sligo Rovers Academy and he joined the club's under-13 team in 2019. He moved to Longford Town's academy in 2021 for two seasons while his father was coaching there, before returning to Sligo Rovers in 2023. In March 2022, Elding scored the winning goal in the National School's Cup Final for his school Coola Post Primary School, in a 3–2 win over Scoil Ruáin in Tipperary at the Athlone Town Stadium. He won a third-tier league title at under-17 level in October 2022 with Longford Town. In November 2024, he featured in the National Under-20 Shield Final for the Sligo Rovers Under-20s as they were defeated 2–1 by Shelbourne.

=== Sligo Rovers ===
Elding made his senior debut for Sligo Rovers on 13 May 2023, replacing Frank Liivak from the bench in the 88th minute of a 3–0 loss at home to Shelbourne. He made a total of five appearances by the end of the 2023 season. On 30 December 2023, he signed his first professional contract with the club. He made a total of 24 appearances in all competitions in the 2024 season, with all but two of them coming off the bench. On 13 February 2025, Elding signed a new contract with the club until the end of the 2027 season. He scored the first goal of his senior career on 15 February 2025, in a 3–2 loss to Waterford at The Showgrounds. On 7 March 2025, Elding opened the scoring in a 1–1 draw away to Cork City at Turners Cross on his 19th birthday. He scored an equaliser on 4 April 2025, in an eventual 4–2 defeat away to Bohemians at Dalymount Park. Elding scored a goal of the season contender against Bohemians on 27 June 2025, and was subsequently linked with a move to Serie A side Juventus. On 12 September 2025, he scored the first hat-trick of his career, giving his side a three-goal lead in their FAI Cup Quarter Final away to Kerry, before they collapsed and lost 4–3 after extra time to crash out of the cup. He scored a total of 16 goals in 36 appearances in all competitions, helping his side to secure their place in the division in the final game of the season and earning himself a place in the PFAI Premier Division Team of the Year as voted by his fellow players. He was also voted PFAI Young Player of the Year for 2025 by his fellow players, as well as being voted Sligo Rovers Player of the Year. During the off season, he was subject to interest from Austrian Bundesliga champions Sturm Graz, being shown around their facilities and attending a match as a guest of the club.

=== Hibernian ===
On 29 January 2026, Elding signed for Scottish Premiership club Hibernian on a four-and-a-half-year contract for an undisclosed fee, believed to be €400,000 up front plus add-ons. He made his debut for the club on 1 February 2026, coming off the bench in a 0–0 draw with Rangers at Easter Road. On 14 February 2026, he made his first start for the club and opened the scoring in a 2–0 win over St Mirren with a 42nd-minute header. On 4 April 2026 he opened the scoring in a 3–0 win at home to Kilmarnock after just 13 seconds, getting on the end of Felix Passlack's pass.

On 30 July 2026, he scored the first European goal of his career, opening the scoring in the 9th minute of a 4–1 victory over Malisheva in the UEFA Conference League.

== Personal life ==
He is the son of former professional footballer Anthony Elding. He played Gaelic football during his primary school years. After moving to Ireland, Elding grew up in Riverstown, County Sligo alongside future Republic of Ireland international Johnny Kenny.

== International career ==
Elding is eligible for England through birth and Republic of Ireland through residency, having lived in the country since the age of six after his father signed for Sligo Rovers. He received a call up to the Republic of Ireland U16 side in June 2021 for an assessment training camp. In June 2025, his club manager John Russell confirmed that Elding was in the process of finalising switching his international eligibility to the Republic of Ireland. In April 2026, he was due to receive his Irish passport but a mandatory ceremony to do so was cancelled due to the 2026 Irish fuel protests, meaning his wait to declare for Ireland was further delayed, with Elding stating "Hopefully one day I can be in the national team scoring goals." Despite still not yet being eligible to play, Elding was called to train with the Ireland squad in May 2026 during their preparations for friendlies against Qatar and Canada, in order to help integrate him with the international squad environment.

Elding received his Irish passport in September 2026, and made his full international debut for Ireland as a late substitute in a 1–0 defeat against Kosovo on 24 September.

In November 2026, with the Republic of Ireland U21 side in the playoffs to reach their first ever European Championships, Elding dropped down to the side for the first time, ahead of their 2027 UEFA European Under-21 Championship qualification play-offs against Finland U21.

== Career statistics ==
=== Club ===
As of match played 7 November 2026

Appearances and goals by club, season and competition
Club	Season	League			National cup (Note: Includes FAI Cup)		League cup (Note: Includes Scottish League Cup)		Other		Total	
Club	Season	Division	Apps	Goals	Apps	Goals	Apps	Goals	Apps	Goals	Apps	Goals
Sligo Rovers	2023	LOI Premier Division	5	0	0	0	—		—		5	0
Sligo Rovers	2024	LOI Premier Division	22	0	2	0	—		—		24	0
Sligo Rovers	2025	LOI Premier Division	35	12	3	4	—		—		38	16
Sligo Rovers	Total		62	12	5	4	—		—		67	16
Hibernian	2025–26	Scottish Premiership	13	3	—		—		—		13	3
Hibernian	2026–27	Scottish Premiership	9	2	0	0	2	1	5 (Note: Appearances in UEFA Conference League)	2	16	5
Hibernian	Total		22	5	0	0	2	1	5	2	29	8
Career Total			84	17	5	4	2	1	5	2	96	24

=== International ===
As of match played 24 September 2026

Appearances and goals by national team and year
National team	Year	Apps	Goals
Republic of Ireland	2026	1	0
Total		1	0

== Honours ==
Individual

- PFAI Young Player of the Year: 2025
- Sligo Rovers Player of the Year: 2025
- PFAI Premier Division Team of the Year: 2025
