= Mitchy Ntelo =

Belgian footballer (born 2001)

Personal information
- Full name: Mitchy-Yorham Ntelo Mbala
- Date of birth: 4 May 2001 (age 25)
- Place of birth: Liège, Belgium
- Height: 1.88 m (6 ft 2 in)
- Position: Forward

Team information
- Current team: Aberdeen
- Number: 31

Youth career
- Zulte Waregem
- Standard Liège

Senior career*
Years	Team	Apps	(Gls)
2021–2022	Standard Liège	0	(0)
2021–2022	→ MVV (loan)	34	(10)
2022–2024	Zébra Élites	41	(5)
2023–2024	Charleroi	4	(0)
2024	Lokomotiv Plovdiv	17	(6)
2024–2026	Yverdon	30	(2)
2026	→ Botev Vratsa (loan)	14	(6)
2026–	Aberdeen	0	(0)

International career
2020	Belgium U19	1	(0)
- * Club domestic league appearances and goals as of 11 June 2026

Mitchy-Yorham Ntelo Mbala (born 4 May 2001) is a Belgian professional footballer who plays as a forward for Scottish Premiership club Aberdeen.

== Club career ==
Ntelo is a youth academy graduate of Standard Liège. On 23 July 2021, club announced that three players including Ntelo will join Dutch side MVV Maastricht on a season long loan deal. He made his professional debut on 9 August 2021 in a 1–0 league win against Jong Utrecht. On 20 August, he scored his first three goals in professional career in a 3–2 win against Helmond Sport.

In August 2022, Ntelo joined Charleroi on a two-year contract. On 30 January 2024, he joined Bulgarian club Lokomotiv Plovdiv.

On 27 August 2024, Ntelo joined Yverdon.

On 8 August 2026, Ntelo joined Aberdeen.

== International career ==
Ntelo is a former Belgian youth international.

== Personal life ==
Born in Belgium, Ntelo is of Congolese origin.

== Career statistics ==
=== Club ===
As of 14 January 2022

Appearances and goals by club, season and competition
Club	Season	League			Cup		Continental		Total	
Club	Season	Division	Apps	Goals	Apps	Goals	Apps	Goals	Apps	Goals
MVV Maastricht (loan)	2021–22	Eerste Divisie	22	7	2	0	—		24	7
Career total			22	7	2	0	0	0	24	7
