= Ante Šuto =

Australian footballer (born 2000)

Personal information
- Full name: Ante Šuto
- Date of birth: 19 June 2000 (age 26)
- Place of birth: Imotski, Croatia
- Height: 1.85 m (6 ft 1 in)
- Position: Striker

Team information
- Current team: Hibernian
- Number: 22

Youth career
- Croatia Zmijavci
- 2014–2016: RNK Split
- 2016–2018: Hajduk Split

Senior career*
Years	Team	Apps	(Gls)
2018–2024	Croatia Zmijavci	61	(13)
2024–2026	Slaven Belupo	49	(9)
2026–	Hibernian	20	(4)
- * Club domestic league appearances and goals as of 15 September 2026

Ante Šuto (Croatian: [ˈante ˈʃuto] AHN-teh SHOO-toh; born 19 June 2000) is a footballer who plays as a striker for Scottish Premiership club Hibernian. He previously played for Croatian Football League (HNL) clubs Croatia Zmijavci and Slaven Belupo.

== Early life ==
Šuto was born on 19 June 2000 in Imotski, Split-Dalmatia County. In his youth years, he played for the academies of Croatia Zmijavci, RNK Split and Hajduk Split.

== Club career ==
=== Hibernian ===
Following rumours published by BBC Sport and the Hibs Observer of Šuto arriving in Edinburgh for a medical, it was officially confirmed on Deadline Day that he had signed for Scottish Premiership club Hibernian on a two and a half year deal in the midst of the 2025–26 season, after reportedly being on the radar for the club for over half a year. He made his debut for the club on 4 February 2026, coming on as a substitute for Dane Scarlett and subsequently scoring the winning goal in second half stoppage time in a 3–2 home win over Dundee United at Easter Road in Leith.

== International career ==
Šuto was born in Croatia, and holds dual Croatian and Australian citizenship through his Melbourne-born father.

Following his signing and subsequent debut goal for Hibernian on 4 February 2026, a possible selection for the Australia national team was suggested by media outlets in Australia, due to the unlikelihood of him being selected for the Croatia national team. Hibernian also has two other Australian internationals: Martin Boyle (who scored in the same match) and Jack Iredale, both of whom were born in Scotland. Following the suggestions, he admitted that he would like to represent the Socceroos.

Following a good spell of form at club level, Šuto was called up to the Australia squad for the first time in March 2026 to face Cameroon and Curaçao in the FIFA Series.
